= Riya Sen =

Indian actress

- Sen in 2007
- Born: Riya Dev Varma; 24 January 1981 (age 45); Calcutta, West Bengal, India
- Occupations: Actress; model
- Years active: 1991–present
- Spouse: Shivam Tewari (m. 2017)
- Mother: Moon Moon Sen
- Relatives: Raima Sen (sister); Suchitra Sen (grandmother)

Riya Sen (Bengali pronunciation: [rija ʃen]; born Riya Dev Varma; 24 January 1981), also known as Riyaa Senn is an Indian actress and model who primarily appears in Hindi, Bengali, English, Telugu, Tamil, Malayalam and Odia films.

Born to actress Moon Moon Sen and Bharat Dev Varma, Sen comes from a royal background. Her father hails from the royal family of the erstwhile Tripura State. He was the son of Ila Devi, a princess of Cooch Behar State and nephew of Gayatri Devi, Maharani of Jaipur State. Sen's grandmother Suchitra Sen was a veteran actress. She began her acting career when she was five years old, playing her mother's daughter on screen for the first time. Later in 1991 she worked as a child actress in the film Vishkanya. Her first commercial success in her film career was with Style, a 2001 Hindi low-budget comedy directed by N. Chandra. Some of her other notable films include producer Pritish Nandy's musical film, Jhankaar Beats (2003) in Hinglish, and Malayalam horror film Ananthabhadram (2005). She won the Star Guide Award as best actress for her performance in Noukadubi.

Sen was first recognised as a model when she performed in Falguni Pathak's music video Yaad Piya Ki Aane Lagi at the age of seventeen in 1998. Since then, she has appeared in music videos, television advertisements, fashion shows, and on magazine covers. Sen has worked as an activist and appeared in an AIDS awareness music video with the aim of dispelling popular myths about the disease. She also helped raise funds for paediatric eye-care and underprivileged children. Riya has been granted an O-1 visa to the United States for her extraordinary abilities.

== Acting career ==
Sen first appeared as a child artist in the film when she was five years old. Later, in 1991 she worked as a child actress in the film Vishkanya, where she played the role of the young Pooja Bedi. At the age of 19, she did National Film Awards winning director Bharathiraja's Tamil film, Taj Mahal (2000) which was written by Mani Ratnam while music was composed by A. R. Rahman, which did not achieve commercial success. She was scheduled to make her Bollywood film debut in Love You Hamesha, opposite actor Akshaye Khanna; however, the film was stalled, and she finally made her debut in N. Chandra's Style in 2001. This low-budget comedy was the first commercial success in over a decade for the director. A launch pad for Riya, cast in the female lead along with fellow-newcomers, Sharman Joshi, Sahil Khan and Shilpi Mudgal, the film pioneered a trend of commercial success for small budget films in India. Riya and the second female lead of the film were replaced by aspirant actresses Sonali Joshi and Jaya Seal in Xcuse Me.

Her next success was Jhankaar Beats, comedy revolving around the music of legendary composer R D Burman, which saw her playing a small and glamorous role alongside Shayan Munshi, Juhi Chawla, Rahul Bose, Rinke Khanna and Sanjay Suri. Produced by Pritish Nandy, publishing director of The Times of India, the film was made on a budget of Rs. 25 million (US$525,000), marking the sixth in a row of small to medium budget films made by Pritish Nandy Communications (PNC). Despite being part of a wave of offbeat films that mostly failed to make an impact at the box office, it drew public attention upon its release, which led to a commercial success among a restricted audience targeted by a selective release in twenty cities. It was one of the first films made in Hinglish, a mixture of Hindi and English.

Her films Style and Jhankar Beats have done wonders commercially. Her latter films Harry Baweja's Qayamat and Subhash Ghai's Apna Sapna Money Money were also box office hits and that ran for 150 days. These films were 4 consecutive hits in a row. While many of her appearances have been item numbers and cameos, few of her leading roles have been in Low-budget films. Though she had small roles in Dil Vil Pyar Vyar (2002), Qayamat (2003) and Plan (2004), attention was drawn to her item numbers in all three, especially the one in Qayamat that featured her in a bubble-bath. Besides this, she performed another item number in James (2005) on director-producer Ram Gopal Varma's behest, who has a history of casting aspirant actress-models like Sameera Reddy, Isha Koppikar and Koena Mitra in similar roles. Furthermore, she took part in a dance number for Sajid Khan's Heyy Babyy (2007) that featured several mainstream Bollywood actresses.

=== Non-Hindi films ===
Riya has, in addition to Hindi films, appeared in Bengali, Tamil, Telugu, Malayalam and English films. Her film career began in the earnest with Tamil films such as Bharathi Raja's Taj Mahal, co-starring Manjoj Bharatiraja in the male lead, and Manoj Bhatnaghar's Good Luck, opposite Prashanth. Both of the films failed commercially, she also did a dance number for N. Maharajan's Arasatchi.

Her first English language movie was It Was Raining That Night, a remake of the Bengali film Hei Brishtir Raat, scripted by Sudeshna Roy and directed by Mahesh Manjrekar. In the film, she collaborated with her mother Moon Moon Sen. Riya was slated to appear in Anjan Dutt's Bengali-English bilingual film The Bong Connection with her sister, but she was eventually dropped from the project and replaced by Peeya Rai Chaudhary. The two sisters were later cast together in director Ajai Sinha's 3 Bachelors, a Bengali film that started as The Bachelor in 2002 and was released in 2012.

Her most successful non-Hindi film has been director Santhosh Sivan's Ananthabhadram (2005). The first Malayalam venture for both Riya and Sivan, was both a critical and commercial success. It won five Kerala State Film Awards and surfaced as one of the biggest Malayalam successes that year. She played the role of Bhama in the film, a village girl who is lured by Digambaran, the evil magician portrayed by Manoj K. Jayan. In a song-and-dance sequence showing Digambaran turning Bhama into a medium for demonic rituals, the choreographer Aparna Sindoor made abundant use of Kathakali movements. The use of Kathakali has been a high point in the resurgence of the classical dance form in other major Indian films as well, including Shaji Karun's Vanaprastham (1999) and Adoor Gopalakrishnan's Kalamandalam Ramankutty Nair (2005). She made her Telugu debut with Nenu Meeku Telusa?, in which she was paired opposite Manoj Manchu.

In 2012 Sen won the Star Guide Award as best actress for her performance in Noukadubi.

She was also featured in video song of Kamaal Khan album Suno To Deewana Dil in song Jaana.

== Modelling career ==
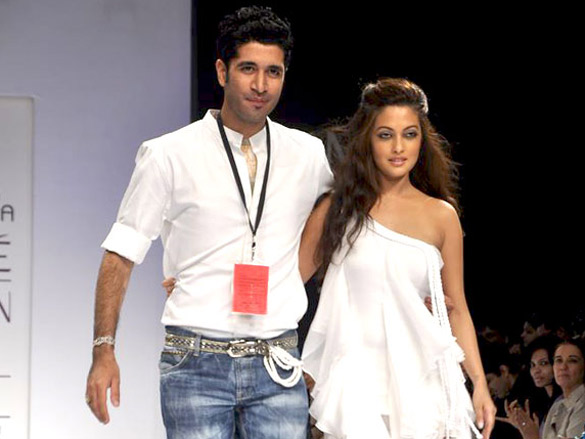
Sen (right) at Lakme Fashion Week, 2011

Sen became a popular model when she appeared in numerous music videos for songs by popular singers, including Falguni Pathak's Yaad Piya Ki Aane Lagi (alternative title: Chudi Jo Khankayi), Asha Bhosle's Jhumka Gira Re, Jagjit Singh and Bhosle's Jab Samne Tum and Kahin Kahin Se, Lata Mangeshkar, Bhonsle and Singh's Dil Kahin Hosh Kahin, Sonu Nigam's Jeena Hai Tere Liye and Shaan's Sutta Maro. She shot for her first music video, Yaad Piya Ki Aane Lagi, at the age of sixteen. This led to her being identified primarily as a performer for music videos early in her career, an image she aimed to shed in 2005. Sen has appeared on several magazine covers, including Femina, Elaan, Man's World, Gladrags, Savvy and Indian versions of Elle, Maxim and Cosmopolitan, as well as on the ramp of major fashion shows like Lakmé Fashion Week (2005–07) and Wills Fashion Week (2006–2007). She participated in fashion shows along with her elder sister, Raima Sen. Besides modelling, Sen has ventured into the advertisement world as well. A high point of her modelling career came in 2006, when she became the soft drink, Limca's brand ambassador, replacing Deepika Padukone. Her other notable assignments include Colgate, Dabur Vatika, Reliance Industries, Cadbury Dairy Milk Chocolate, and Nirma.

In 2004, she was featured partially nude in leading Indian photographer Dabboo Ratnani's annual calendar, which is a major happening in the Indian glamour industry. According to Daboo, "Her mother saw it much later, after the calendar released. She thought it was too sexy, and Riya shouldn't have done it. But the response to the photograph was superb. Riya was so thrilled that for her next ad campaign, she asked me to light her up like I did in this." A career highlight for the model, it led to a three-year contract with Ratnani to feature her on his annual calendar. She is the only female face to be featured on the calendar for five consecutive years (2003–2007).

== Personal life and family ==
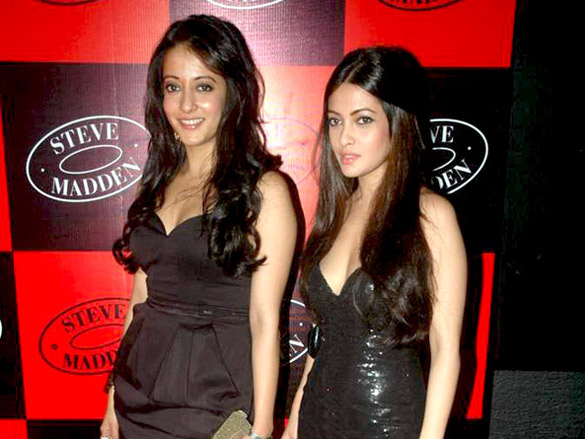
Sisters Raima Sen (left) and Riya Sen Sen (right)

Born on 24 January 1981 in Kolkata, West Bengal, Sen is the daughter of Moon Moon Sen, a former actress, and granddaughter of Suchitra Sen, a legend in Bengali cinema. Before leaving for Mumbai, she lived in Kolkata with her parents and sister Raima Sen, also an actress. Her father Bharat Dev Varma is a member of the royal family of Tripura. Her paternal grandmother, Ila Devi, was a princess of Cooch Behar, whose younger sister Gayatri Devi was the Maharani of Jaipur. Sen is also a descendant of the social reformer Keshab Chandra Sen through her paternal lineage; her ancestor Suniti Devi, the Maharani of Cooch Behar and daughter of Keshab Chandra Sen, was the mother of Jitendra Narayan, who was Raima Sen's paternal great-grandfather. Her paternal great-grandmother Indira was the only daughter of Maharaja Sayajirao Gaekwad III of Baroda. Sen's maternal great-grandfather Adinath Sen was a prominent Kolkata businessman, whose father Dinanath Sen – a relative of former Union Law Minister Ashoke Kumar Sen – was the Diwan or a Minister of the Maharaja of Tripura. The sisters are credited on-screen under their mother's maiden name, although their official papers carry the surname Dev Varma.

Sen completed her schooling in ICSE from Loreto House in Kolkata. She went on to study philosophy in a Bengali uccha madhyamik school Rani Birla Girls' College (a University of Calcutta affiliate). Sen had a degree from the National Institute of Fashion Technology NIFT Mumbai in fashion designing and information technology. She went to London to the Pinewood Actors Studio for an acting course and simultaneously did voice and dubbing classes. She also did a couple of private acting workshops with renowned British teachers. She learnt the Queen's English -British accent with renowned voice coach Barbara Berkeley. She studied in New York at the TV1 acting studio in Times Square. Sen has also done a course in Paris at the Institute Marangoni for fashion and image styling. Sen also did a course at the University of Arts in London in 'branding' and a cooking course in Thailand at the blue elephant culinary school. Sen briefly practised kickboxing and karate. She is passionate about painting and has been painting since she was a baby. She's a certified yoga teacher. She did her 200 hours Teacher training course in Rishikesh for hatha vinyasa, Yin yoga teacher training course in dharamsala at the Trimurti school and Aerial yoga teacher training course from Ulu yoga in Bali.

During the filming of Shaadi No. 1 in France, she was knocked unconscious after being accidentally run over by a stuntman's motorbike, but she was not seriously injured.

In August 2017, Sen married her boyfriend Shivam Tewari in a private Bengali Hindu ceremony.

== Media image ==
Sen's on-screen performances have established her as a bold youth icon in India. Since entering the film industry, she has gained attention for wearing a bikini in Shaadi No. 1 and sharing on-screen kisses with co-stars Ashmit Patel in Silsiilay and Sharman Joshi in Style. Such performances garnered negative attention because of the relatively conservative outlook of Indian cinema at that time and her own statements about such practices. Sen's public persona is compared to her mother Moon Moon, who was seen as a sex symbol of her time.

Although her film career has yet to achieve large-scale success, Sen has generated considerable media attention. She was ranked ninth on Femina 50 Most Beautiful Women, published in the magazine's September 2007 issue. She was a jury member for the 2008 Final of the Mr. India contest. Sen appeared in Haath Se Haath Mila, an HIV/AIDS awareness music video. She made charity appearances at McDonald's India to raise money for paediatric eye-care during World Children's Week (14–20 November) in 2003 and also for underprivileged children during the Corona virus pandemic in 2020. In 2025, she bought the badminton franchise Racket Raiders team which plays in the Yuva National Badminton League.

== Filmography ==
=== Film ===
Year	Film	Role	Language	Notes	Ref.
1991	Vishkanya	Young Nishi	Hindi	As a child artist	
1994	Gajamukta		Bengali	As a child artist	
1999	Taj Mahal	Machakanni	Tamil		
2000	Good Luck	Priya	Tamil		
2000	Mone Pore Tomake	Riya	Bengali	Bangladeshi film	
2001	Style	Sheena	Hindi		
2002	Dil Vil Pyar Vyar	Riya Thapar, Gaurav's girlfriend	Hindi	Cameo appearance	
2003	Saazish		Hindi		
2003	Qayamat: City Under Threat	Sheetal	Hindi		
2003	Jhankaar Beats	Preeti	Hindi, English		
2004	Dil Ne Jise Apna Kahaa	Kamini	Hindi	Cameo appearance	
2004	Plan	Shalini	Hindi	Item number	
2004	Arasatchi	Iruvathu Vaisu	Tamil	Item number	
2005	Ananthabhadram	Bhama	Malayalam	Debut Malayalam movie	
2005	Shaadi No. 1	Madhuri	Hindi		
2005	Tum... Ho Na!	Reema	Hindi		
2005	James	–	Hindi	Item number	
2005	Silsiilay	Anushka	Hindi		
2005	It Was Raining That Night	Savitri Banerje	English		
2006	Apna Sapna Money Money	Shivani	Hindi		
2006	Dil Kahin Hosh Kahin	-	Hindi	Video album	
2007	Heyy Baby	–	Hindi	Item number	
2008	Nenu Meeku Telusa?	Madhu	Telugu		
2008	Heroes	Shivani	Hindi		
2009	Zor Lagaa Ke... Haiya!	Chamki	Hindi		
2009	Love Khichdi	Deepti Mehta	Hindi		
2009	Paying Guests	Avni	Hindi		
2010	Benny and Babloo	Riya	Hindi		
2010	Abohoman	Chandrika	Bengali		
2011	Noukadubi	Kamala	Bengali	First appearance with her sister Raima Sen	
2011	Tere Mere Phere	Muskaan	Hindi		
2012	3 Bachelors	Nisha	Hindi	Made almost 10 years ago	
2013	Zindagi 50-50	Naina	Hindi		
2013	Rabba Main Kya Karoon		Hindi		
2013	My Love Story	Item girl	Odia		
2014	Jaatishwar	Sudeshna	Bengali		
2014	Kolkata Calling		Bengali		
2015	Roga Howar Sohoj Upaye		Bengali		
2015	Family Album		Bengali		
2016	Hero 420	Riya	Bengali	Indo-Bangladesh joint production	
2016	Dark Chocolate	Ishani Banerjee	Bengali		
2017	Lonely Girl	Radhika Kapoor	Hindi	Short film	
2022	Love You Hamesha	Meghna	Hindi	Originally scheduled for release in 1999, credited as Rhea Dev Varma	
2025	Nadaaniyan	Anahita Brar	Hindi	cameo appearance	

=== Web series ===
Year	Title	Role	Platform	Notes	Ref.
2016	Alisha	Avantika		Debut Series	
2017	Ragini MMS: Returns	Simran	ALTBalaji		
2019	Poison	Natasha	ZEE5		
2019	Mismatch 2	Mishika	Hoichoi Originals		
2020	Pati Patni Aur Woh	Rimjhim	MX Player		
2023	Bekaaboo	Chitra Irani	ALTBalaji		
2024	Call Me Bae	Mitali Sawla	Prime Video		
2025	Parineeta		Disney+ Hotstar	Upcoming	

== See also ==
- List of Indian film actresses
- List of Bollywood Clans: The Sens
