= Kismat (1968 film) =

Indian film directed by Manmohan Desai

- Theatrical poster
- Directed by: Manmohan Desai
- Screenplay by: Brij Katyal
- Story by: Manmohan Desai
- Produced by: Kamal Mehra
- Starring: Biswajeet; Babita; Helen; Kamal Mehra; Murad
- Cinematography: Keki Mistry
- Edited by: Kamlakar Karkhanis (as Kamlakar)
- Music by: O.P.Nayyar
- Production company: Pride of Asia Films
- Release date: 31 December 1968
- Running time: 139 minutes
- Country: India
- Language: Hindi
- Box office: ₹1.4 crores

Kismat (transl. Destiny) is a 1968 Indian Hindi-language romantic thriller film directed by Manmohan Desai, produced by Kamal Mehra and released under the banner of Pride of Asia Films. It stars Biswajeet, Babita, Helen and Kamal Mehra in prominent roles. Other notable actors in the film are Bhagwan Sinha, Murad, M. B. Shetty (father of Rohit Shetty), Hari Shivdasani, Hiralal, Indra Kumar, Jagdish Raj (as Jagdishraj), Polsan, Prem Kumar, Paul Sharma, Tun Tun and Ullhas. (Note: Kismat at the Internet Movie Database. IMDb. Retrieved: 1 September 2011.) (Note: Indian Film Database – 1968. Cineplot. Article: 26 November 2010, Retrieved: 12 September 2011)

It can be categorised as a family romantic thriller film. It was shot in 14 reels, using 35 mm film format in Eastman Color.

The film has been noted mainly for the soundtrack given by O.P. Nayyar, which included three songs that became very popular – "Aao Huzoor Tumko", "Kajra Mohabbat Wala" and "Aankhon Mein Qayamat". Biswajeet was one of the first leading actors in Bollywood to cross dress as a woman on screen for the song "Kajra Mohabbat Wala". (Note: How to train your drag in The Hindu. The Hindu. Article: 22 May 2010, Retrieved: 10 September 2011.) (Note: Actors in Cross Dressing. India Glitz. Retrieved: 6 September 2011.) (Note: The Hero who was made up to look like a girl Archived 23 September 2011 at the Wayback Machine. Bollywood Hungama. Retrieved: 6 September 2011.) This film was the last collaboration between singer Shamshad Begum and music director O.P. Nayyar. Shamshad Begum recorded her last song for O.P. Nayyar, "Kajra Mohabbat Wala" along with Asha Bhosle in this film. (Note: Shamshad Begum – O.P. Nayyar collaboration. Cineplot. Article: 16 July 2010, Retrieved 12 September 2011)

== Plot ==
The nation is struck by a series of bomb blasts spread across the country. The Commissioner of Police is baffled as to who is behind these attacks. The Commissioner receives an anonymous call where the caller says that he knows who the masterminds behind the blasts are and their associates. He also says that he would like to help the police. The informant then says that he has stored the names and images of mastermind and their associates in a microdot. The informant here is the Mr. Gonz, owner of the store 'Twist Musical & PhotoShop'. The main mastermind or the villain is Scorpion. He learns that the informant is about to give their organisation's information to the police. Scorpion then sends his men or goons to recover the microdot.

As soon as the goons enter the shop and threaten the informant to give the microdot, the hero Vicky enters the store to get his guitar. The informant slips the microdot into Vicky's guitar and Vicky leaves. The goons realise this and follow Vicky. Vicky is a singer and guitar player at a local nightclub. He along with Nancy entertain the crowds. After the night show, Vicky and Nancy head to Vicky's room. Here they encounter Mr. Gonz who is badly injured. Meanwhile, the goons follow Vicky to his room and kill Mr. Gonz. They try to take the guitar (his father's gift) containing the microdot from him, but Vicky escapes with the guitar. He is on the run and tries to convince the police that Mr. Gonz has been killed, but is unable to do so. He again encounters the goons. This time he escapes from them and boards a train. Here he meets Roma who has also run away (from her home) due to the strict rules enforced by her rich and wealthy father.

During the train journey, Vicky and Roma become friendly. The goons follow Vicky and try to attack them on the train. Vicky and Roma manage to escape from the train. They are in the middle of nowhere and start heading towards the nearest town. On their way to the town, they encounter Jani Bhai, an inventor, who gives them a ride to the town, with his customised car. Jani and Vicky become best of friends and Jani gets Vicky a job as a guitarist/singer in the hotel by portraying him as a famous singer. Incidentally, Roma is staying in the same hotel. Vicky and Roma fall in love. Scorpion learns that Vicky is staying in the hotel through his henchmen, Julie, present as an employee in the hotel. Meanwhile, Nancy comes to this hotel and creates a misunderstanding between Vicky and Roma. Roma dumps Vicky and Nancy takes Vicky to her room. Nancy plots to kill Vicky but in the process, gets herself killed accidentally. While dying, she tells Vicky that Scorpion had sent her and she was compelled to kill because her parents were held hostage. The rest of the film deals with who Scorpion is and whether Vicky and Roma get together. (Note: Kismat (1968) Film Review. Retrieved: 1 September 2011.)

== Cast ==
- Biswajeet as Vicky
- Babita as Roma
- Helen as Nancy
- Murad as Commissioner of Police
- Jani Bhai, an eccentric inventor
- Hari Shivdasani, as Roma's father
- Hiralal as Lopez
- M. B. Shetty as Joe
- Bhagwan Sinha as Gonz, owner of 'Twist Musical & PhotoShop' an informant to the police
- Yee Chang as Chang, an enemy agent and most wanted man by many countries
- Ulhas as Police inspector
- Thelma as Julie
- Jagdish Raj as drunk man at bar
- Kamal Mehra as Jaanibhai
- Jullian as Piano player in song "Aao Huzoor Tumko"
- Polson as the comic performer in Jaycee miniland

== Production ==
=== Filming ===
For the filming of the song "Kajra Mohabbat Wale", the hero Biswajeet had to be dressed up as a girl and the heroine Babita as a Pathan. Biswajeet in an interview, said this about the preparation that went about making the song, "Kajra Mohabbat Wale":

Director Manmohan Desai would sit in on our rehearsals with choreographer P. L. Raj that went on for 6–7 days. For me, the song meant hours in make-up, elaborate wigs and a sari pallu that never stayed in place. The adas and nakhras were not so difficult because as I child I had watched the neighbourhood dadas act out female parts in pararar plays because those days respectable ladies didn't act. In theatres in Delhi and UP, coins were showered when the song came on.

— Biswajeet, to Bollywood Hungama

=== Controversies ===
The song "Kajra Mohabbat Wala" became very popular due to the way it was filmed, choreographed and for its memorable tune. Biswajeet did the drag act of putting a female disguise for this song. Film historian and critic, Firoze Rangoonwalla explains the controversy that took place after the film was released: (Note: Men In Drag in Screen magazine. Screen India. Retrieved: 9 September 2011.)

In fact, Biswajeet's drag act in Kismat worked a little too well. Though Biswajeet was a hero for a long time, he was never portrayed as a very masculine hero. So when he put on a female disguise and sang "Kajra Mohabbat Wala", the audience received it with wolf whistles, knowing very well that he was a man! I remember that one of the film magazines made a very caustic remark that if Biswajeet were to stick to this kind of roles, he would be much more successful. There was controversy and Biswajeet filed a suit against the magazine, though the suit fizzled out.

— Firoze Rangoonwalla, Film historian and critic, to Bollywood Hungama

== Release ==
=== Home media ===
The film has been released in the following distribution formats: VCD (Note: VCD at Induna.com. Induna.com. Retrieved 12 September 2011) and recently as DVD.

== Reception ==
The music by O.P. Nayyar was well received with three popular and memorable songs.

=== Box office ===
The film was declared an average film in the box office verdicts. It could be attributed to the story and the earnings it made (Net of INR ₹ 70,00,000 vs Gross of INR ₹ 1,40,00,000). (Note: Box Office India for films of 1968. Box Office India. Retrieved: 6 September 2011.)

== Soundtrack ==
The music of the film was composed by O.P. Nayyar. Notable tracks are "Aankhon Mein Qayamat Ke Kajal" sung by Mahendra Kapoor, "Aao Huzoor Tumko" sung by Asha Bhosle and "Kajra Mohabbat Wala" sung by Asha Bhosle and Shamshad Begum.

Kismat

Soundtrack album by O.P.Nayyar
- Released: 1968
- Recorded: 1968
- Genre: Film soundtrack
- Length: 29:59
- Language: Hindi
- Labels: His Master's Voice, Penguin

=== Track listing ===
Originally, the film consisted of six soundtracks (mainly for the cassette and gramophone version). (Note: Kismat (1968) Music Record Review. Retrieved: 3 September 2011.) (Note: Kismat (1968) Music CD at Saregama. Saregama. Retrieved: 3 September 2011.) (Note: Kismat (1968) Songs in iTunes. iTunes Apple. Retrieved: 4 September 2011.)

No.	Title	Lyrics	Singer(s)	Length
1.	"Aao Huzoor Tumko"	Noor Devasi	Asha Bhosle	05:51
2.	"Kajra Mohabbat Wala"	S. H. Bihari	Asha Bhosle, Shamshad Begum	06:22
3.	"Lakhon Hain Yahan Dilwale"	S. H. Bihari	Mahendra Kapoor	04:17
4.	"Aankhon Mein Qayamat Ke Kajal"	S. H. Bihari	Mahendra Kapoor	04:22
5.	"One Two Three Baby"	S. H. Bihari	Asha Bhosle, Mahendra Kapoor	06:54
6.	"Kismat (Title Music)"			03:13

=== Additional tracks ===
In mid-2000, two additional tracks were added known as revival versions for "Aao Huzoor Tum Ko" and "Kajra Mohabbat Wala" songs. The CD and iTunes versions of the film now contain 8 tracks.

No.	Title	Lyrics	Singer(s)	Length
1.	"Aao Huzoor Tum Ko (Revival)"	Noor Devasi	Asha Bhosle	04:43
2.	"Kajra Mohabbat Wala (Revival)"	S H Bihari	Asha Bhosle, Shamshad Begum	06:15

=== Vinyl or gramophone record track Info ===
The Gramophone record consists of two sides having the following tracks:

Side 1

No.	Title	Lyrics	Singer(s)	Length
1.	"Aankhon Mein Qayamat Ke Kajal"	S H Bihari	Mahendra Kapoor
2.	"Kajra Mohabbat Wala"	S H Bihari	Asha Bhosle, Shamshad Begum
3.	"Title Music"

Side 2

No.	Title	Lyrics	Singer(s)	Length
1.	"Aao Huzoor Tum Ko"	Noor Devasi	Asha Bhosle
2.	"Lakhon Hain Yahan Dilwale"	S H Bihari	Mahendra Kapoor
3.	"One Two Three Baby"	S H Bihari	Asha Bhosle, Mahendra Kapoor

=== Songs remixed ===
The tracks that have been remixed the most are:

- "Aao Huzoor Tumko"
- "Kajra Mohabbat Wala"

Both these songs are sung by female singers and most notable, Asha Bhosle features in both of them.

The track "Aao Huzoor Tumko" has been remixed a number of times. Following is a list of notable films and music albums it was used in:

- "Punjab", a song in the Global Spirit, a 2003 album by Karunesh S (Note: Aao Huzoor Tumko Remix. Last.fm. Retrieved: 6 September 2011.)
- Double Cross – Ek Dhoka, a 2005 film
- Non-Stop Love Shots, a 2005 album
- Salaam-e-Ishq, a 2007 Hindi film, as a small song clip (played between in the scene where it's Anil Kapoor's birthday and he sees Anjali)

=== Songs reused ===
The track, "Kajra Mohabbat Wala", has been used as a non-remixed song in the 2011 Hindi movie, Tanu Weds Manu. The song has been used as a marriage celebration or ritual song. The song has been portrayed by Kangana Ranaut. The song rights have been obtained from His Master's Voice. (Note: 'Kajra Mohabbatwala' re-creates magic in 'Tanu Weds Manu' in The Indian Express. Indian Express. Article: 18 January 2011. Retrieved: 9 September 2011.)

== See also ==
- Bollywood films of 1968
