= Poker (disambiguation) =

Poker is a family of card games.

Poker may also refer to:

- Poker (film), a 1951 Swedish film
- "Poker" (Malcolm in the Middle), a television episode
- "Poker" (song), a song by Electric Light Orchestra
- Fire iron or poker, a metal instrument for tending a fire
- Jeanneau Poker, a French sailboat design

== See also ==
- Poker face (disambiguation)
- Poker Game (disambiguation)
- Pocher, a defunct Italian company making model cars and trains
