= Carol Hudson =

Carol Hudson may refer to:

- Carol Hudson, character in Vice Raid
- Carole Hudson, character in Glee
