= Chadti Jawani Meri Chaal Mastani =

Song by Mohammed Rafi and Lata Mangeshkar

from the album Caravan
- Language: Hindi
- Released: 1971
- Genre: Film score
- Length: 4:30
- Label: Saregama
- Composer: R. D. Burman
- Lyricist: Majrooh Sultanpuri
- Producer: Tahir Hussain

"Chadti Jawani Meri Chaal Mastani" is a Hindi song from the 1971 film Caravan. The song was composed by R. D. Burman, who was nominated for the Filmfare Best Music Director Award. It also brought fame to actress Aruna Irani who performs in this item number. The song has been remixed by various artists, of which the remix with "The Ketchup Song" became popular for its seductive video and was criticized for obscenity.

== Original ==
The original video features actors Jeetendra and Aruna Irani lip syncing on the song recorded by Mohammed Rafi and Lata Mangeshkar. Asha Parekh, the lead actress of the film, is also seen in the video as a viewer of the dance sequence being performed by Jeetendra and Irani, who are part of a travelling group of Banjaras who do road shows to earn their living. Parekh and Irani, both fall in love with Jeetendra and Irani is ready to go to any extent to get her love. Through the lyrics, Irani complains in this song of how Jeetendra ignores her beauty and prime youth.

The music score is composed by R. D. Burman on lyrics penned by Majrooh Sultanpuri. The album includes many popular songs like "Piya Tu Ab To Aaja", "Goria Kahan Tera Desh" and "Dilbar Dil Se Pyare". Burman included a variety of genres of jazz, blue and Hindustani folk in the film. This song, along with "Goria Kahan...", have the folk music, which were befitting the gypsy portrayal of characters. The film won Burman a nomination for the Filmfare Award for Best Music Director at the 19th Filmfare Awards. But the musician duo Shankar Jaikishan won the award for their film score of Mera Naam Joker.

The song also brought popularity to Aruna Irani, who sizzled in this item number. She also won her first nomination of a Filmfare Award in the Supporting Actress category for her performance in the film. The film was produced and directed by brothers Tahir and Nasir Hussain respectively. The film proved to be a "hit" at the box office and ranked in the top 10 grossers of the year 1971.

== Remix ==
The song has been remixed by various artists; of which the 2003 version sung by Shashwati Phukan & Joy Zubeen Da achieved good success. Released in 2003, as a single from the remix album Aur Ek Haseena Thi... Remix by Harry Anand & DJ Aqeel, the song was mixed with 2002 internationally hit Spanish song "The Ketchup Song" making it Hinglish. The album had thirteen more remixes of Bollywood songs of yesteryear. The song featured models Negar Khan and Priyanka Kothari (then credited as Nisha Kothari). The version became popular because of the video which showed semi-clad models in the getup of angels. The Iranian-Norwegian model Khan became popular for her butt-pinching dance step. It was also Kothari's first music video. The seductive picturization of the song was criticized. In an article about remix videos in India Today, the choreography was criticized as "spineless substance plaguing the videos". Upon its release, along with the video of the remix version of "Kaanta Laga" and others, the video of this song has been quoted as an example in various discussions on censorship of content needed on television broadcasts in India. In February 2005, Mumbai Police sent a legal notice under the Section 19 of Cable Television Networks (Regulation) Act to five different television channels for broadcasting videos with obscenity after receiving numerous complaints from citizens.
