= Poker face =

Poker face may refer to:

- Blank expression or poker face

== Film and television ==
- Poker Face (2012 film), a Spanish comedy thriller
- Poker Face (2022 film), a 2022 film directed by and starring Russell Crowe
- Poker Face (TV series), a 2023 American mystery drama series
- PokerFace, a 2006–2007 British game show
  - PokerFace: Dil Sachcha Chehra Jhootha, the Indian version
- "Poker Face" (Grey's Anatomy), an episode of Grey's Anatomy
- "Poker Face", an episode of Talking Tom and Friends
- Poker-Face, a fictional villain in SilverHawks

== Music ==
- "Poker Face" (song), by Lady Gaga, 2008
- "Poker Face" (Ayumi Hamasaki song), 1998
- "Poker Face", a 1997 song from the album Déjà-vu by Hitomi
- "Poker Face", a 2001 song from Bad Dreams by Swollen Members
- "Poker Face", a 2013 song from Miss Monochrome by Yui Horie

== Nickname ==
- Ebbie Goodfellow (1906–1985), Canadian National Hockey League player
- Hanns Scharff (1907–1992), German World War II interrogator

== Other uses ==
- Poker Face: A Girlhood Among Gamblers, a 2003 memoir by Katy Lederer
- Pokerface, a 1977 poetry collection by Billy Collins
