= Aao Huzoor Tumko =

Song by Asha Bhosle
- Language: Hindi
- Released: 1968
- Genre: Filmi, Dance pop
- Length: 5:51
- Composer: O. P. Nayyar
- Lyricist: Noor Devasi

"Aao Huzoor Tumko" is a song composed by O. P. Nayyar and sung by Asha Bhosle for the 1968 Bollywood film Kismat. The song was pictured on Babita and Biswajit Chatterjee. It is considered to be one of the most memorable songs associated with Babita.

== Popularity ==
The song became very popular upon its release. It was written by a lesser known lyricist, Noor Devasi (active during 1959-1992). It is considered to be one of the top five songs sung by Asha Bhosle. It was one of the songs selected for Shaan-e-Pakistan function celebrating Indian and Pakistani cultures in Delhi during 10 and 12 September 2015.

== Re-release ==
A mixed version of this song titled as Punjab in the album Global Spirit was released in 2000 by Karunesh. The album won American record chart New Age Reporter's Best Dance/Dub/Club Album award in 2007.
