= Caravan (1971 film) =

1971 Indian film by Nasir Hussain

- Theatrical release poster
- Directed by: Nasir Hussain
- Written by: Nasir Hussain
- Screenplay by: Sachin Bhowmick
- Produced by: Tahir Hussain
- Starring: Jeetendra; Asha Parekh
- Cinematography: Munir Khan
- Edited by: Babu Lavande; Gurudutt Shirali
- Music by: R. D. Burman
- Production companies: Nasir Hussain Films; T.V. Films
- Distributed by: Sky Entertainment (DVD since 2002)
- Release date: 29 October 1971
- Running time: 161 min
- Country: India
- Language: Hindi
- Box office: 3.6 crore, re-release collection est. ₹353 million ($44 million)

Caravan (Hindustani pronunciation: [kɑːɾʋɑ̃ː]) is a 1971 Indian Hindi-language masala film directed by Nasir Hussain and produced by his brother Tahir Hussain, under the Nasir Hussain Films and T.V. Films banners. The film stars Jeetendra and Asha Parekh. Three Hussain fixtures were involved in the music production: composer R.D. Burman, lyricist Majrooh Sultanpuri, and singer Mohammad Rafi. It is a remake of the 1966 Tamil film Parakkum Pavai, whose plot was loosely inspired by Girl on the Run (1953).

Caravan was a superhit domestically in India. It found even greater success abroad in China when it released there in 1979, becoming the highest-grossing foreign film in China. The film is estimated to have sold over 300 million tickets in Asia, mostly in China. Adjusted for inflation, it is still one of the highest grossing Indian films of all time.

== Plot ==
Mohandas, a successful mill owner, finds out that his trusted employee, Rajan, has been embezzling money from him. After he confronts him, Rajan pushes him out of the window of a multi-story building, killing him. Mohandas' only daughter and heiress, Sunita, is deeply saddened by her father's death and writes a will naming Rajan as the sole heir to her father's property after her own death. Rajan lies to Sunita, claiming that it was Mohandas' final wish for them to marry. After the wedding, Monica, a cabaret dancer and Rajan's lover, confronts him in front of Sunita, presenting an unsent letter by Mohandas to his friend, Karamchand, as evidence that he embezzled money. She then reveals that he also murdered Sunita's father and that Sunita is his next target, so Sunita runs to her car and drives off, unaware that Rajan had tampered with the brakes, leaving her unable to stop. As the car speeds down a hill, Sunita jumps out, and the police presume she is dead. However, since her body was never found, Rajan believes she is still alive and sends his team to search for her.

To seek justice for her father's murder, Sunita plans to travel to Bombay to retrieve the letter from Monica. To do so, she changes her identity to Soni, a village girl, and secretly hides in the back of a lorry of Mohan and Johnny, who are a part of a group of performing Banjaras, heading to Bombay to pick up Mohan's brother, Montu, before traveling to Khandala and Bangalore, to see their mother. After Mohan catches Sunita stealing his food, he agrees to take her to Bombay.

When Sunita enters Monica's dressing room, she sees Monica and Rajan together, revealing that she was complicit in his plan. Rajan says that he is afraid of Karamchand, who would sacrifice his life for Sunita and will be in Bangalore in two months. After Rajan sees Sunita, she sneaks back into the lorry, planning to travel with their caravan to Bangalore and Montu sneaks Sunita into their tent. When Mohan finds out, Sunita promises to be their servant in repayment, but since she doesn't know how to cook, Montu steals Ratna's food and serves it as Sunita's. After Ratna confronts her, Mohan kicks Sunita out for causing Johnny and Montu to lie to him, but Johnny convinces Mohan to bring Sunita back. Then Nisha, Mithalal Tota's prized dancer who is smitten with Mohan, attacks Sunita, so, in response, Mohan lies to Nisha, telling her that Sunita is his future wife. At Nisha's performance at a warehouse in Poona, she refuses to go on stage unless they abandon Sunita. To avoid the owner calling the police, Mohan tells Sunita to go dance alongside him.

After Sunita escapes from Rajan's men, who kidnapped her at the market, she is taken to the hospital to treat her injuries. When the nurse mentions Mohan's concern for her survival, Sunita falls in love with him. Mohan then proposes, but she refuses, thinking about her marriage to Rajan, and as a result, Mohan turns to alcohol. Since Rajan plans to kill Monica after Sunita, Monica chooses not to dispose of the letter and instead calls Karamchand to warn him about Rajan.

After Sunita and Mohan reconcile, they arrive in Bangalore for their wedding ceremony, but Sunita writes a letter, detailing all that happened to her and runs away to call Karamchand, who is later killed by Rajan's men. When Mohan, Sunita, Nisha, and Montu arrive at Monica's home, Rajan's men break in, tie Monica up, and kidnap them. When Nisha escapes, she cuts the noose Mohan is on while standing on Montu. Mohan steals the kidnappers car to find Sunita, who is tied to a tree, while Rajan is digging her grave. As Mohan unties Sunita after fighting Rajan, Rajan rises up and points their gun at them. However, Nisha appears and takes the bullet, sacrificing herself. The police then shoot and kill Rajan. After the Banjaras bid farewell to Sunita, she reappears, choosing to rejoin them on their journey.

== Cast ==
- Asha Parekh as Sunita / Soni
- Jeetendra as Mohan
- Aruna Irani as Nisha
- Mehmood Jr. as Montu
- Helen as Monica
- Krishen Mehta as Rajan
- Ravindra Kapoor as Johnny
- Madan Puri as Mithalal Tota
- Sanjana as Tara
- Manorama as Ratna
- Anwar Ali as Bhola
- Murad as Mohandas
- Dulari as Mohan's mother
- Shivraj as Karamchand

== Production ==
The film was largely a Khan–Hussain family production, directed by Nasir Hussain and produced by his brother Tahir Hussain, under the Nasir Hussain Films banner.

The film's plot was loosely inspired by the 1953 film Girl on the Run, a little-known crime drama set against the backdrop of a carnival burlesque show, which was changed to a Banjara show in Caravan.

== Soundtrack ==
Caravan

Soundtrack album by R. D. Burman
- Released: 1971
- Genre: Film soundtrack
- Language: Hindi
- Label: Odeon Records

The soundtrack of the film is one of the hit compositions by R. D. Burman. The lyrics of the songs are provided by the veteran poet Majrooh Sultanpuri. The tune of "Ab Jo Mile Hai To" was adapted from "Kannadi Munnadi Thalladi", a song from the 1970 Tamil film Anadhai Anandhan, composed by K. V. Mahadevan.

Title	Singer(s)	Notes
"Hum To Hain Rahi Dil Ke"	Kishore Kumar	Picturized on Jeetendra
"Ab Jo Mile Hain To"	Asha Bhosle	Picturized on Aruna Irani, Jeetendra & Asha Parekh
"Chadti Jawani Meri Chaal Mastani"	Lata Mangeshkar, Mohammed Rafi	Picturized on Jeetendra & Aruna Irani
"Daiya Yeh Main Kahan"	Asha Bhosle	Picturized on Asha Parekh
"Dilbar Dil Se Pyare"	Lata Mangeshkar	Picturized on Aruna Irani
"Goria Kahan Tera Desh"	Mohammad Rafi, Asha Bhosle	Picturized on Jeetendra and Aruna Irani
"Kitna Pyara Wada Hai"	Lata Mangeshkar, Mohammad Rafi	Picturized on Jeetendra and Asha Parekh
"Piya Tu Ab To Aja"	Asha Bhosle, R.D. Burman	Picturized on Helen; Asha Bhosle won the Filmfare Best Female Playback Award

== Box office ==
Caravan was declared a "Super Hit" domestically according to Box Office India. The film grossed ₹36 million ($4.81 million) in India. It was the sixth highest-grossing film of 1971 at the domestic Indian box office. Adjusted for inflation, the film's domestic box office gross is equivalent to ₹5.09 billion in 2017. (Note: Inflation rate from 1993 to 2017: 21.38 times: Aankhen's domestic nett of ₹128.45 million in 1993 is equivalent to ₹2,745,845,840 in 2017.) If we assume it was pure Hindi release then it sold around 19 million in india, as of 2023 Hindi movies ticket price (₹195.6) it grossed 370 core at domestic Box Office.

Overseas, Caravan released in China in 1979 and became a blockbuster there, surpassing Raj Kapoor's Awaara (1951). Caravan became the highest-grossing foreign film ever in China up until then, with 88 million box office admissions in its initial run. It reportedly sold a total of nearly 300 million tickets including re-runs, the highest for any foreign film ever released in China. At an average ticket price of CN¥0.20, the film grossed an estimated CN¥60 million, equivalent to $39 million. Adjusted for inflation, As of 2023 average ticket price of ¥42.3 ($5.97), it grossed $1.791 billion (₹14,800 crore).

In total, the film grossed an estimated ₹353 million ($44 million) in Asia. Adjusted for inflation, this is equivalent to ₹13.68 billion in 2017, or ₹20.94 billion (US$220 million) in 2026.

In terms of footfalls, the film sold an estimated 19 million tickets in India, and nearly 300 million tickets in China, for an estimated total of nearly 319 million tickets sold in Asia.

== Legacy ==
Along with Awaara and Noorie (1979), Caravan left a strong impression on Chinese audiences in the 1980s. It took decades before Tahir Hussain's son Aamir Khan later had a similar impact in China, with films such as Lagaan (2001), 3 Idiots (2009), PK (2014), and Dangal (2016). During his visit to China, Aamir Khan said his father's film Caravan is still fondly remembered there.

== Awards and nominations ==
19th Filmfare Awards:

Won

- Best Female Playback Singer – Asha Bhosle for "Piya Tu Ab To Aaja"

Nominated

- Best Supporting Actress – Aruna Irani
- Best Music Director – R. D. Burman

== See also ==
- List of highest-grossing Indian films in overseas markets
