= Mahadev Betting App Case =

Money laundering scandal

The Mahadev Betting App Case is a high-profile scandal involving an online betting platform that enabled illegal gambling on various games, including poker, card games, badminton, tennis, football, and cricket. The app was created in 2018, and was operated by Dubai-based Saurabh Chandrakar, a former juice seller, and his accomplice Ravi Uppal, both of whom hail from Chhattisgarh, according to the Enforcement Directorate (ED). Other accomplices include Mumbai-based Tanveer Bhatt, Pintu Mehta, and Ayush Mishra. The ED has alleged that the app operated by franchising "panel/branches" to known associates on a 70-30 profit ratio, using the platform to enroll new users, create IDs, and launder money through a complex network of Benami bank accounts. The operation reportedly generated ₹200 crore daily.

== Allegations against Chhattisgarh Chief Minister Bhupesh Baghel ==
The Mahadev Betting App Case gained renewed attention when the Enforcement Directorate alleged that Chhattisgarh Chief Minister Bhupesh Baghel received ₹508 crore in kickbacks from the app's promoters based in the UAE. A 'cash courier', Asim Das, who claimed to be associated with the app promoters alleged this payment, triggering a political row ahead of the state Assembly polls. Chief Minister Bhupesh Baghel has denied these allegations, characterizing them as an attempt to tarnish his image.

== Legal proceedings and ED actions ==
On October 21, 2023, the ED filed its first chargesheet in the case, naming 14 accused, including Saurabh Chandrakar and Ravi Uppal. The probe agency has provisionally attached ₹41 crore worth of proceeds of crime. Ravi Uppal, a key figure among the primary promoters, has been apprehended by Dubai police following a red corner notice issued by Interpol, at the behest of the Enforcement Directorate. Additionally, the ED has conducted raids on several premises linked to hawala operators across various Indian cities, resulting in the attachment of ₹417 crore. In a recent raid in Mumbai, the probe agency also identified seven hawala kingpins allegedly involved in money laundering. In March 2026, the ED attached ₹1700 crore to the case, and as part of the case, seized villas in Burj Khalifa. The Special Investigation Team has arrested actor Sahil Khan for his alleged involvement in the scam.

In November 2026, the Enforcement Directorate told a court in Raipur that the proceeds of crime in the case were estimated to have exceeded ₹92,000 crore, comprising ₹75,000–80,000 crore from Mahadev Online Book, ₹11,000–12,000 crore from Skyexchange.com and around ₹2,400 crore from Lotus365.com. The agency also obtained the custody of alleged kingpin Sourabh Chandrakar, extradited from Oman and arrested on 1 November, until 19 November.

== International connections ==
The investigation into Saurabh Chandrakar's lavish wedding led to the uncovering of alleged hawala operations and connections in the UAE and Pakistan. Chandrakar and Ravi Uppal reportedly joined forces with gangster Dawood Ibrahim's brother Mushtaqeem Ibrahim Kaskar to develop a similar betting app for Pakistan called 'Kheloyar', according to sources.
