= Sejal =

Sejal is a given name. Notable people with the name include:

- Sejal Shah (fl. 2004), Indian cinematographer
