= Sharman Joshi =

Indian actor (born 1979)

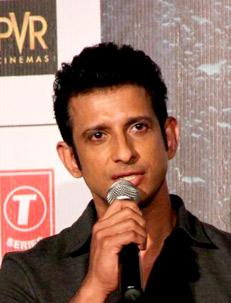
- Joshi in 2015
- Born: 28 April 1979 (age 47); Nagpur, Maharashtra, India
- Occupation: Actor
- Years active: 1999–present
- Spouse: Prerana Chopra (m. 2000)
- Children: 3
- Father: Arvind Joshi
- Relatives: Roy–Joshi–Irani-Desai family

Sharman Joshi (born 28 April 1979) is an Indian actor who primarily works in Hindi films. Joshi is a recipient of several awards including an IIFA Award and nominations for two Filmfare Awards.

Joshi began his career with supporting parts in Godmother (1999) and Lajja (2001). The 2001 film Style proved to be his breakthrough. Following this, he received commercial and critical success with Rang De Basanti (2006), Golmaal (2006), Dhol (2007), Life in a... Metro (2007), 3 Idiots (2009) and Ferrari Ki Sawaari (2012). 3 Idiots earned him the IIFA Award for Best Supporting Actor. This success was followed by several box office failures with the exception of Hate Story 3 (2015) and Mission Mangal (2019).

Joshi expanded to streaming projects with Baarish (2019–2020) and Kafas (2023). He is married to Prerana Chopra with whom he has three children.

== Early life and family ==
Joshi was born on 28 April 1979 in Nagpur to Arvind Joshi and Usha Joshi. His father was a veteran of Gujarati theatre. His sister is actress Manasi Joshi Roy, who is married to actor Rohit Roy.

Joshi belongs to a Gujarati Brahmin family of actors and performing artists. His father's elder brother was theatre actor and director Pravin Joshi and actress Sarita Joshi is his aunt. Actresses Ketki Dave, Purbi Joshi and Poonam Joshi are his cousins.

== Career ==
=== Early work (1999–2005) ===
Joshi made his film debut in the 1999 art film, Godmother. In 2001, he first played Rekha's son in Lajja opposite Aarti Chhabria, which was a success overseas. That year, he had his first lead role in Style, where he played a college student. It was a moderate success and Taran Adarsh was appreciative of his "convincing performance".

In 2003, Joshi first appeared in Kahan Ho Tum. He then reprised his character in Xcuse Me, a sequel to Style. Both films were commercial failures. Following this, in 2005, he appeared in the comedy Shaadi No. 1. Joshi played an unhappy husband who has an affair opposite Soha Ali Khan and Riya Sen. The film emerged a box office average.

=== Breakthrough and acclaim (2006–2012) ===
The year 2006 marked a turning point in Joshi's career. He first played a rebellious college student in Rang De Basanti. This film was a critical and commercial success, emerging as the seventh highest-grossing film of the year. Sudhish Kamath of The Hindu stated, "Sharman is instantly likeable and emotes like a veteran." In the same year, he played a misled student in Golmaal alongside Rimi Sen. The film emerged a box office success and has since gained a cult status. Sukanya Verma called him the real star of the film for his "uninhibited and winsome" act.

Joshi had three releases in 2007. He first played a call centre employee in Life in a... Metro opposite Kangana Ranaut, which was a surprise box office success. Rajeev Masand noted, "Sharman springs a pleasant surprise as he effortlessly slips into the role of the conflicted lover." Following his role in Raqeeb, he played an ambitious young man in Dhol opposite Tanushree Dutta. The following year saw him play the lead in Hello and Sorry Bhai!, both of which were box office failures.

2009 saw Joshi play his career's most notable character of an engineering student in 3 Idiots, which later gained a cult status. The film emerged as the highest grossing Indian film at that time and created several records worldwide. Shubhra Gupta called his performance "first rate". Rajeev Masand also noted: "Joshi has a meatier role, hence succeeds in fleshing out more competently." The film earned him the IIFA Award for Best Supporting Actor.

In 2010, Joshi played a prospective groom in Toh Baat Pakki! opposite Yuvika Chaudhary, which was a box office failure. His next release, Allah Ke Banday also failed commercially. Joshi then played a middle class Parsi who wants to fulfil his son's cricket dream in the 2012 film Ferrari Ki Sawaari. The film emerged a critical and commercial success. Sonia Chopra of Sify was appreciative of Joshi's "natural likeability and earnestness".

=== Later work (2013–present) ===
He also played the role of a cop in the erotic-thriller Wajah Tum Ho. He has played a lead role in the Bollywood movies Kaashi in Search of Ganga (2018) and 3 Storeys. He is also known for his role as Raju Rastogi in the movie 3 Idiots. He made his digital debut with Balaji Telefilms's production Baarish in 2019 as the male lead opposite Asha Negi.

== Other works ==
=== Theatre ===
Joshi has acted, produced and directed stage plays in English, Hindi, Marathi and Gujarati languages. He directed and starred in various theatre performances. He appeared as a deaf character in Gujarati version of popular play All the Best, which did over 550 shows in three years. Another one of his popular comedy play was "Ame Layi Gaya, Tame Rahi Gaya" where he played four different roles. In 2016, he made his directorial debut with the Hindi rom-com, Main Aur Tum. It features him in the lead role along with Tejashree Pradhan.

=== Television ===
In 2009, he hosted a game show at Real T.V. called PokerFace: Dil Sachcha Chehra Jhootha, which was based on a British game show called PokerFace. He has been honored with the life membership of International Film and Television Club of Asian Academy of Film & Television. Sharman refers to be type-cast during his career and spoke about it at a TEDx conference in Mumbai in January, 2017.

== Personal life ==
Joshi married Prerana Chopra, daughter of actor Prem Chopra, on 15 June 2000 at the age of 21. The couple have three children, Khyana Joshi, and twins Vaaryan and Vihaan Joshi.

== Filmography ==
Key
†	Denotes films that have not yet been released

=== Films ===
Year	Title	Role	Notes	Ref.
1999	Godmother	Karsan		
2001	Lajja	Prakash		
2001	Style	Nehal "Bantu" Shah / Rose Mary Marlow (Note: Joshi played a single character with two or more names.)		
2003	Kahan Ho Tum	Rakesh Kumar		
2003	Xcuse Me	Nehal "Bantu" Shah		
2005	Shaadi No. 1	Aryan Kapoor		
2006	Rang De Basanti	Sukhi Ram / Shivaram Rajguru (Note: Joshi played a character who portrays Shivaram Rajguru in a documentary featured in the film.)		
2006	Golmaal: Fun Unlimited	Laxman Prasad Sharma		
2007	Life in a... Metro	Rahul Dhupia		
2007	Raqeeb	Siddharth Verma		
2007	Dhol	Pankaj "Pakya" Tiwari		
2008	Hello	Shyam "Sam" Mehra		
2008	Sorry Bhai!	Siddharth Mathur		
2009	3 Idiots	Raju Rastogi		
2010	Toh Baat Pakki!	Rahul Saxena		
2010	Allah Ke Banday	Vijay Kamble		
2012	Ferrari Ki Sawaari	Rustam "Rusy" Behram Deboo		
2012	3 Bachelors	Amit		
2013	War Chod Na Yaar	Captain Rajveer "Raj" Singh Rana		
2014	Gang of Ghosts	Raju Writer		
2014	Super Nani	Manorath "Mann" Mehra		
2015	Hate Story 3	Aditya Diwan		
2016	1920 London	Jai Singh Gujjar		
2016	Wajah Tum Ho	ACP Kabir Deshmukh		
2018	3 Storeys	Shankar Varma		
2018	Kaashi in Search of Ganga	Kaashi Chaudhary		
2019	The Least of These	Manav Banerjee		
2019	Mission Mangal	Parmeshwar Joshi		
2021	Mera Fauji Calling	Abhishek		
2021	Babloo Bachelor	Ranvijay "Babloo"		
2023	Congratulations	Aditya Mehta	Gujarati film; also producer	
2023	Ouch 2	Sudeep	Short film	
2023	Music School	Manoj Kumar	Telugu-Hindi bilingual film	
2023	Aankh Micholi	Yuvraj Singh		
2023	Sab Moh Maya Hai	Piyush Mishra		
2025	Sikandar	Amar		
2025	Bhalobashar Morshum †	Abir	Bengali film; filming	
TBA	Golmaal 5 †	Laxman Prasad Sharma	Filming	

=== Television ===
Year	Title	Role	Notes	Ref.
2009	PokerFace: Dil Sachcha Chehra Jhootha	Host		
2009	Taarak Mehta Ka Ooltah Chashmah	Himself	Special appearance	
2019–2020	Baarish	Anuj Mehta	2 seasons	
2020	Pawan & Pooja	Pawan Mehra		
2023	Kafas	Raghav Vashisht		
2025	Medical Dreams	Subrat Sinha		

=== Discography ===
Year	Film	Song	Composer	Ref.
2009	3 Idiots	"Give Me Some Sunshine"	Shantanu Moitra	

== Awards and nominations ==
Year	Award	Category	Film	Result	Ref.
2000	3rd Zee Cine Awards	Best Male Debut	Godmother	Nominated	
2004	11th Screen Awards	Best Comedian	Xcuse Me	Nominated	
2006	2nd Global Indian Film Awards	Best Comedian	Golmaal	Nominated	
2007	52nd Filmfare Awards	Best Performance in a Comic Role	Golmaal	Nominated	
2007	8th IIFA Awards	Best Performance in a Comic Role	Rang De Basanti	Nominated	
2007	13th Screen Awards	Best Supporting Actor	Rang De Basanti	Nominated	
2008	14th Screen Awards	Best Supporting Actor	Life in a... Metro	Nominated	
2010	55th Filmfare Awards	Best Supporting Actor	3 Idiots	Nominated	
2010	11th IIFA Awards	Best Supporting Actor	3 Idiots	Won	
2010	16th Screen Awards	Best Supporting Actor	3 Idiots	Nominated	
2010	8th Stardust Awards	Best Supporting Actor	3 Idiots	Nominated	
