= R. D. Burman =

Indian musician (1939–1994)

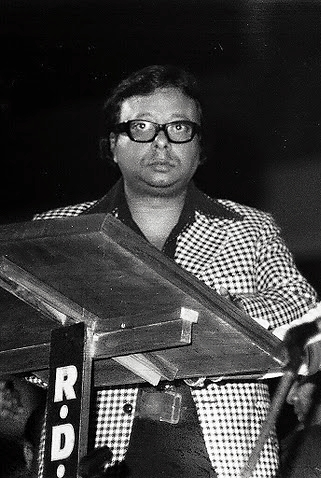
- Burman in 1981
- Born: Rahul Dev Burman; 27 June 1939; Calcutta, Bengal Presidency, British India (now Kolkata, West Bengal, India)
- Died: 4 January 1994 (aged 54); Bombay (now Mumbai), Maharashtra, India
- Occupations: Music director; Score composer; Singer; Actor; Music Arranger; Music Producer; Musician
- Years active: 1961–1994
- Spouses: Rita Patel (m. 1966; div. 1971); Asha Bhosle (m. 1980)
- Parents: S. D. Burman; Meera Dev Burman

Rahul Dev Burman (27 June 1939 – 4 January 1994) was an Indian music director and singer, who is considered to be one of the greatest and most successful music directors of the Hindi film music and Bengali cinema industry. From the 1960s to the 1990s, Burman composed musical scores for 331 films, bringing a new level of music ensemble with his compositions. Burman did his major work with legendary singers Kishore Kumar, Lata Mangeshkar, Asha Bhosle and Mohammed Rafi. He also worked extensively with lyricists like Majrooh Sultanpuri, Anand Bakshi and Gulzar, with whom he created some of the most memorable numbers in his career. Nicknamed Pancham, he was the only son of the composer Sachin Dev Burman and his Bengali lyricist wife Meera Dev Burman.

He was mainly active in the Hindi film industry as a composer, and also provided vocals for a few compositions. He influenced the next generation of Indian music directors, and his songs remain popular in India and overseas. Many years after his death, his songs continued to inspire new singers and composers.

== Early life and career beginnings ==
Burman was born to the Bengali and Hindi film composer and singer, Sachin Dev Burman, and his lyricist wife Meera Dev Burman (née Dasgupta), in Calcutta. Initially, he was nicknamed Tublu by his maternal grandmother, although he later became known by the nickname Pancham. According to some stories, he was nicknamed Pancham because, as a child, whenever he cried, it sounded in the fifth note (Pa), G note on c major scale, of music notation; in Hindustani Classical Music, Pancham is the name of the fifth scale degree: (IAST: Ṣaḍja, Ṛṣabha, Gandhāra, Madhyama, Pañcama, Dhaivata, Niṣāda). Another theory says that the baby was nicknamed Pancham because he could cry in five different notes. Yet another version is that when the veteran Indian actor Ashok Kumar saw a newborn Rahul uttering the syllable Pa repeatedly, he nicknamed the boy Pancham.

Burman received his early education in West Bengal from Ballygunge Government High School in Kolkata. His father S. D. Burman was a noted music director in Hindi-language films, the Mumbai-based Hindi film industry. When he was seventeen years old, R. D. Burman composed his first song, "Aye Meri Topi Palat Ke Aa", which his father used in the film Funtoosh (1956). The tune of the song "Sar Jo Tera Chakraaye" was also composed by him as a child and his father included it in the soundtrack of Guru Dutt's Pyaasa (1957).

In Mumbai, Burman was trained by Ustad Ali Akbar Khan (sarod) and Samta Prasad (tabla). He also considered Salil Chowdhury his guru. He served as an assistant to his father and often played harmonica in his orchestras.

Some of the notable films in which Burman is credited as the music assistant include Chalti Ka Naam Gaadi (1958), Kaagaz Ke Phool (1959), Tere Ghar Ke Samne (1963), Bandini (1963), Ziddi (1964), Guide (1965) and Teen Devian (1965). Burman also played mouth organ for his father's hit composition "Hai Apna Dil To Aawara", which was featured in the film Solva Saal, and sung by Hemanta Mukhopadhyay.

In 1959, Burman signed up as a music director for the film Raaz, directed by Guru Dutt's assistant Niranjan. However, the film was never completed. The lyrics of this Guru Dutt and Waheeda Rehman-starrer film were written by Shailendra. Burman recorded two songs for the film before it was shelved. The first song was sung by Geeta Dutt and Asha Bhosle, and the second one had vocals by Shamshad Begum.

Burman's first released film as an independent music director was Chhote Nawab (1961). When the noted Hindi film comedian Mehmood decided to produce Chhote Nawab, he first approached Burman's father Sachin Dev Burman for the music. However, S. D. Burman declined the offer, advising he was unavailable. At this meeting, Mehmood noticed Rahul playing tabla, and signed him as the music director for Chhote Nawab. Burman later developed a close association with Mehmood, and made a cameo appearance in Mehmood's film Bhoot Bungla (1965).

== Music career ==
=== 1961–1975: Early career and rise to prominence ===
R. D. Burman began his career as a music director with the 1961 film Chhote Nawab, which proved to be a lukewarm success and so were his next three ventures, Bhoot Bungla (1965), Teesra Kaun (1965) and Pati Patni (1966). He established himself with Vijay Anand's musical mystery film Teesri Manzil (1966), which starred Shammi Kapoor and Asha Parekh in the lead. It went on to become a huge success at the box office which was attributed to its superhit songs, "O Haseena Zulfonwali Jane Jahan", "O Mere Sona Re Sona", "Aaja Aaja Main Hoon Pyar Tera", "Deewana Mujhsa Nahin" and "Tumne Mujhe Dekha Hokar Meherban", all of which were featured in the year-end annual list of Binaca Geetmala. In addition, the soundtrack of Teesri Manzil proved to be the seventh best-selling Hindi film album of the 1960s.

Burman's other notable work of the decade was the soundtrack of the musical comedy Padosan (1968), whose songs like "Ek Chatur Naar", "Mere Samne Wali Khidki Mein", "Mere Bhole Balam" and "Kehna Hai Kehna Hai" remain popular to date and played a major part in making the film a commercial success. In 1969, he composed music for two hit films, Waris and Pyar Ka Mausam and, while working as an assistant to his father in Shakti Samanta's Aradhana, he played an instrumental role in making Kishore Kumar the playback voice of Rajesh Khanna, who became a superstar with the film's blockbuster success. Even Kumar's singing career was boosted, and he became the leading playback singer of Hindi cinema and remained at that position till his death in 1987.

Burman emerged as the leading music director of Hindi cinema in the year 1970 with Shakti Samanta's musical romantic drama Kati Patang, starring Rajesh Khanna and Asha Parekh. At the box office, it went on to become a blockbuster, while almost all of its songs, such as "Yeh Shaam Mastani", "Pyaar Deewana Hota Hai", "Yeh Jo Mohabbat Hai", and "Jis Gali Mein Tera Ghar", proving to be chartbusters and playing an important role in the box office success of the film. Its soundtrack became one of the highest-selling Bollywood soundtracks of the 1970s. The same year, he also delivered music in another Rajesh Khanna hit The Train, which had the popular songs "Gulabi Aankhen", a solo by Mohammed Rafi and "Kis Liye Maine Pyar Kiya", a solo by Lata Mangeshkar.

For the next three years, he worked in top-grossing films, such as Haré Rama Haré Krishna (1971), Caravan (1971), Mela (1971), Amar Prem (1972), Mere Jeevan Saathi (1972), Apna Desh (1972), Jawani Diwani (1972), Raampur Ka Lakshman (1972), Parichay (1972), Seeta Aur Geeta (1972), Do Chor (1972), Samadhi (1972), Anamika (1973), Aa Gale Lag Jaa (1973), Yaadon Ki Baaraat (1973) and Namak Haraam (1973), all of which had superhit songs like "Chadti Jawani Meri Chaal Mastani", "Piya Tu Ab To Aaja" and "Kitna Pyara Wada Hai" (Caravan), "Dum Maro Dum", "Phoolon Ka Taron Ka" and "Kanchi Re Kanchi" (Hare Rama Hare Krishna), "Rut Hai Milan Ki Sathi Mera Aa Re" and "Gori Ke Haath Mein Jaise Ye Challa" (Mela), "Raina Beeti Jaye", "Chingari Koi Bhadke", "Kuchh Toh Log Kahenge" and "Yeh Kya Hua" (Amar Prem), "O Mere Dil Ke Chain", "Chala Jaata Hoon" and "Aao Na, Gale Laga Lo Na" (Mere Jeevan Saathi), "Duniya Mein Logon Ko", "Kajra Lagake Gajra Sajake" and "Ro Na Kabhi Nahin Rona" (Apna Desh), "Samne Yeh Kaun Aaya", "Yeh Jawani Hai Deewani" and "Jaan-E-Jaan Dhoondta Phir Raha Hoon Tumhe Raat Din" (Jawani Diwani), "Gum Hai Kisi Ke Pyar Mein Dil Subah Sham" and "Rampur Ka Vasi Hoon" (Raampur Ka Lakshman), "Musafir Hoon Yaaron" and "Sa Re Ke Sa Re" (Parichay), "O Saathi Chal" and "Koi Ladki Mujhe Kal Raat" (Seeta Aur Geeta), "Chahe Raho Door, Chahe Raho Paas" and "Meri Jaan, Meri Jaan Kehna Mano" (Do Chor), "Kaanta Laga", "Jab Tak Rahe" and "Jaan-E-Jaana Jao" (Samadhi), "Meri Bheegi Bheegi Si" and "Bahon Mein Chale Aao" (Anamika), "Vaada Karo" and "Tera Mujhse Hain Pehle Ka Nata Koi" (Aa Gale Lag Jaa), "Yaadon Ki Baaraat Nikli Hai Aaj Dil Ke Dwaare", "Chura Liya Hai Tumne Jo Dil Ko, Nazar Nahin Churana Sanam", "Lekar Hum Deewana Dil, Phirte Hai Manzil Manzil" and "Meri Soni, Meri Tamanna, Jhuth Nahin Hai Mera Pyar" (Yaadon Ki Baaraat), "Diye Jalte Hain Phool Khilte Hain" and "Main Shair Badnaam" (Namak Haraam). The soundtrack of Caravan proved to be one of the best-selling Hindi film albums of the 1970s while that of Yaadon Ki Baaraat emerged as the second best-selling Hindi film album of the decade. For Caravan, Amar Prem and Yaadon Ki Baaraat, Burman received three consecutive nominations at Filmfare for Best Music Direction. In 1974, his notable ventures, included Aap Ki Kasam, Khote Sikkay, Ajanabee and Phir Kab Milogi, all of which had evergreen songs like "Karvatein Badalte Rahe", "Jai Jai Shiv Shankar", "Suno Kaho Kaha Suna", "Zindagi Ke Safar Mein, "Jeevan Mein Tu Darna Nahin", "Ek Ajanabee Haseena Se", "Hum Dono Do Premi", "Bheegi Bheegi Raaton Mein" and "Kahin Karti Hogi". Burman's peak came in 1975 when he scored music for Sholay, Deewaar, Khel Khel Mein, Warrant, Aandhi, Khushboo and Dharam Karam, all of which were hugely successful at the box office, especially Sholay which emerged as an All Time Blockbuster and remains the biggest hit in the history of Indian cinema. Its songs "Mehbooba Mehbooba", "Yeh Dosti Hum Nahin", "Haa Jab Tak Hai Jaan", "Koi Haseena" topped the year-end annual list of Binaca Geetmala and made its soundtrack one of the best-selling Hindi film albums of the 1970s along with winning Burman another nomination in the Best Music Director category at Filmfare. Other notable songs composed by him that year were – "Kehdoon Tumhe Ya Chup Rahoon" (Deewaar), "Humne Tumko Dekha", "Ek Main Aur Ek Tu, Dono Mile Is Tarah", "Khullam Khulla Pyar Karenge Hum Dono" (Khel Khel Mein), "Sun Bhai Baarati", "Ruk Jana O Jana Humse" (Warrant), "Tere Bina Zindagi Se Koi" (adapted from "Jete Jete Pathe Holo Deri"), "Tum Aa Gaye Ho Noor Aa Gaya", "Is Mod Se Jate Hain" (Aandhi), "O Majhi Re Apna Kinara" (Khushboo), "Ek Din Bik Jayega Mati Ke Mol", "Tere Humsafar Geet Hain Tere" (Dharam Karam).

=== 1976–1983: Setback and return to success ===
With Rajesh Khanna losing superstardom and change of box office equation from romantic musicals to action oriented multi-starrers, Burman saw a career slump in the latter-half of the 1970s.

In 1976, most of his releases did not do well commercially, with notable exceptions being Nehle Pe Dehla, Balika Badhu and Mehbooba, all three of which were profitable ventures with hit songs, such as "Sawan Ka Mahina Aa Gaya", "Bade Achhe Lagte Hain" and "Mere Naina Sawan Bhadon", respectively. His prospects improved, the following year, with Nasir Hussain's musical blockbuster Hum Kisise Kum Naheen, which had a number of runaway hits, including "Bachna Ae Haseeno", "Mil Gaya, Hum Ko Saathi Mil Gaya", "Hai Agar Dushman Zamana, Gham Nahin", "Yeh Ladka Haay Allah Kaisa Hai Deewana", "Kya Hua Tera Vaada, Woh Kasam, Woh Iraada", "Chand Mera Dil, Chandni Ho Tum" and "Tum Kya Jaano Mohabbat Kya Hai". Also its soundtrack proved to be the fourth-best selling Hindi film album of the decade. His only other notable film that year was Gulzar's directional venture Kinara, which had memorable songs like "Naam Hum Jayega" and "Ek Hi Khwab". In 1978, Burman composed for Amitabh Bachchan starrer Kasme Vaade and Dharmendra starrer Azaad, both of which were major box office successes with their songs "Kasme Vaade Nibhayenge Hum", "Aati Rahengi Baharen" in the former and "Raju Chal Raju", "Jaan Ki Kasam" in the latter proving to be very popular, though his other big-budget venture Shalimar proved to be a box office bomb despite having melodious songs, such as "Hum Bewafa Hargiz Na The" and "Mera Pyaar Shalimar", sung by Kishore Kumar and Asha Bhosle, respectively. He concluded the decade with a hit in Gol Maal and a couple of moderately successful films, The Great Gambler, Jhoota Kahin Ka, Jurmana and Nauker. The songs from these films "Aanewala Pal" (Gol Maal), "Do Lafzon Ki Hai Dil Ki Kahani" (The Great Gambler), "Jeevan Ke Har Mod" (Jhoota Kahin Ka), "Sawan Ke Jhoole Pade Hai" (Jurmana), "Pallo Latke Re Mharo Pallo Latke (Nauker) found a spot in the year-end annual list of Binaca Geetmala.

The early-1980s saw Burman's rise to top once again with the blockbusters, Love Story (1981) and Betaab (1983), both of which emerged two of the best selling soundtrack albums of the decade with songs that remain evergreen, such as "Kaisa Tera Pyaar", "Dekho Maine Dekha Hai Ek Sapna", "Teri Yaad Aa Rahi Hai" in the former and "Jab Hum Jawan Honge", "Teri Tasveer Milgayi", "Badal Yun Garajta Hai" in the latter. This phase also saw him getting consecutive Best Music Director awards at Filmfare for Sanam Teri Kasam (1982), which had melodies like "Kitne Bhi Tu Karle Sitam" and "Dekhta Hoon Koi Ladki" was again one of the best-selling albums of the 1980s and Masoom (1983), whose songs "Tujhse Naraz Nahin Zindagi", "Lakdi Ki Kathi", "Do Naina Aur Ek Kahaani" received immense critical acclaim.

His other popular numbers during this period in notable box office successes, included - "Piya Bawri, Piya Bawri" and "Sun Sun Sun Didi" (Khubsoorat), "Yamma Yamma" and "Jaanu Meri Jaan" (Shaan), "Khatouba Khatouba" and "Qayamat Qayamat" (Alibaba Aur 40 Chor), "Apne Pyar Ke" and "Manchali O Manchali" (Barsaat Ki Ek Raat), "Jahan Teri Yeh Nazar Hai" and "Tum Saath Ho Jab Apne" (Kaalia), "Kya Yehi Pyar Hai" and "Aa Dekhen Zara" (Rocky), "Preetam Aan Milo" and "Hothon Pe Beeti Baat" (Angoor), "Dilbar Mere" and "Dukki Pe Dukki Ho" (Satte Pe Satta), "Yeh Zameen Gaa Rahi Hai" and "Kya Hua Ek Baat Par" (Teri Kasam), "Jane Kaise Kab Kahan" and "Hamne Sanam Ko Khat Likha" (Shakti), "Agar Tum Na Hote" and "Dheere Dheere Zara Zara" (Agar Tum Na Hote).

=== 1984–1994: Later career ===
In 1984, none of Burman's films worked, but some of his songs in these films like "Hai Mubarak Aaj Ka Din" (Boxer), "Jaane Kya Baat Hai" (Sunny), "Kaisi Lag Rahi Hoon Main" (Jhutha Sach), "Aaj Ki Raat" (Jagir) and "Maine Dil Diya" (Zameen Aasman) were well-received. The following year too, almost all his films sank without a trace with two exceptions being Ramesh Sippy's romantic musical Saagar (1985) and Rahul Rawail's actioner Arjun (1985), both of which did well at the box office and had memorable songs like "Chehra Hai Ya Chand Khila Hai" and "Saagar Kinare" (Saagar), "Mammaiya Kero Mamma" and "Dhadkan Pal Pal Badhti Jaaye" (Arjun), all of which were written by Javed Akhtar. Also the music of Saagar proved to be one of the highest-selling Bollywood albums of the decade and got him a nomination in the Best Music Director category at 33rd Filmfare Awards.

In the latter-half of the 1980s, Burman's notable ventures, included Gulzar's romantic drama Ijaazat (1987) and Vidhu Vinod Chopra's crime thriller Parinda (1989). Both the films opened to widespread acclaim for their direction, story and songs, such as "Mera Kuchh Saamaan", "Qatra Qatra Milti Hai" in the former and "Tumse Milke Aisa Laga Tumse Milke", "Kitni Hai Pyari Pyari" in the latter.

After a dull beginning to the new decade with flops like Jeene Do (1990), Dushman (1990) and Indrajeet (1991), Burman delivered music in Priyadarshan's Gardish (1993), which proved to be a box office success with hit songs like "Hum Na Samjhe The", sung by S. P. Balasubrahmanyam and "Yeh Mera Dil To Pagal Hai", a duet by Balasubrahmanyam and Asha Bhosle. In 1994, he once again collaborated with Vidhu Vinod Chopra for his magnum opus 1942: A Love Story. Although the film did not succeed commercially, its music was a huge hit and the third best-selling Hindi film album of 1994 with songs that remained popular such as "Ek Ladki Ko Dekha", "Kuchh Na Kaho", both solos by Kumar Sanu and "Pyar Hua Chupke Se", sung by Kavita Krishnamurthy. Burman died a few days before the release of the film, and was posthumously awarded his third Best Music Director at the 40th Filmfare Awards.

== Personal life ==
Burman's first wife was Rita Patel, whom he had met in Darjeeling. Rita, a fan, had bet her friends that she would be able to get a film-date with Burman. They two married in 1966, and divorced in 1971. The song Musafir Hoon Yaaron ("I'm a Traveller") from Parichay (1972) was composed while he was at a hotel after the separation.

Burman married Asha Bhosle in 1980 after a protracted romance despite his mother's vehement opposition to their relationship. Together, the couple recorded many hit songs and also staged many live performances. However, towards the end of his life, they did not live together. Burman had financial difficulties, particularly later in his life. His mother Meera died in 2007, thirteen years after his death. She had been suffering from Alzheimer's even before her son's death. Just before her death she had been moved to an old age home, and moved back to her son's residence after the issue became a controversy.

== Death ==
R.D. Burman died on 4 January 1994 due to a heart attack. Burman had been suffering from cardiovascular disease for around six years before his death and even underwent a surgery because of an earlier heart attack in 1988.

== Style ==
Burman has been credited with revolutionizing Hindi film music. He incorporated a wide range of influences from several genres in his scores though his primary inspiration was Bengali folk. Burman's career coincided with the rise of Rajesh Khanna-starrer youth love stories. He made electronic rock popular in these popular love stories. He often mixed disco and rock elements with Bengali folk music. He also used jazz elements, which had been introduced to him by the studio pianist Kersi Lord.

According to Douglas Wolk, Burman "wrapped sugary string swoops around as many ideas as he could squeeze in at once". Biswarup Sen describes his popular music as one featuring multicultural influences, and characterized by "frenetic pacing, youthful exuberance and upbeat rhythms".

Burman was influenced by Western, Latin, Oriental and Arabic music, and incorporated elements from these in his own music. He also experimented with different musical sounds produced from methods such as rubbing sandpaper and knocking bamboo sticks together. He blew into beer bottles to produce the opening beats of "Mehbooba, Mehbooba". Similarly, he used cups and saucers to create the tinkling sound for the song "Chura Liya Hai" from the film Yaadon Ki Baaraat (1973). For Satte Pe Satta (1982), he made the singer Annette Pinto gargle to produce a background sound. He also rubbed a comb on a rough surface to produce a whooshing sound in the song "Meri Samne Wali Khidki Main" from the film Padosan (1968).

On multiple occasions, Burman experimented with recording the same song with different singers. For Kudrat (1981), he recorded the light semi-classical version of the song "Hume Tumse Pyar Kitna" in the voice of Kishore Kumar, while the classical version was recorded in the voice of Parveen Sultana.

== Controversies ==
=== Allegations of plagiarism ===
Music critics and commentators have long discussed alleged instances of musical borrowing in Burman's work. Journalist Vivek Kaul wrote that "R.D. Burman was accused of plagiarising right through his career... this was probably one question that Pancham had to defend himself against in most of his interviews." A retrospective article on classic Hindi film music similarly stated that "even revered composers such as R. D. Burman and S. D. Burman occasionally adapted foreign tunes."

However researcher Vishwas Nerurkar commented in his book,

"The late R.D. Burman has often been accused of lifting western tunes and of using them in their original format. This is somewhat true, but in my study of all his work, I cannot discover this piracy in more than 20 to 30 numbers. In a prolific output of over 1500 songs, this can be easily overlooked. And even in these so called 'lifted' tunes, one cannot help but notice how the composer with great dexterity and skill had changed the original "inspiration", only giving us a glimpse now and then of a western tune. All composers have their influences. Pancham had his. His uniqueness was the variations he created on inspired numbers. On the other hand his severe critics who have heard his other 1450 songs do attribute originality and great fountains of melody. That certainly makes him an original composer."

Burman himself acknowledged using Western dance music "as a source of inspiration" for his compositions. As was common in Hindi films, some of his songs featured the tunes of popular foreign songs. For example, Ramesh Sippy insisted that the tune of the traditional Cyprus song "Say You Love Me" (arranged and sung by Demis Roussos) be used for "Mehbooba Mehbooba" (Sholay, 1975), and Nasir Hussain wanted to use ABBA's "Mamma Mia" for "Mil Gaya Hum Ko Saathi". Other examples of Burman songs inspired by foreign songs include "Aao Twist Karen" from Bhoot Bungla (Chubby Checker's "Let's Twist Again"), "Tumse Milke" (Leo Sayer's "When I Need You"), and "Zindagi Milke Bitaayenge" (Paul Anka's "The Longest Day") and "Jahan Teri Yeh Nazar Hai" (Persian artist Zia Atabi's "Heleh Maali") and "Dilbar Mere" (Alexandra's "Zigeunerjunge").

== Legacy ==
Several Hindi films made after Burman's death contain his original songs or their remixed versions. Dil Vil Pyar Vyar (2002), which contains several re-arranged hit songs of Burman, was made as a tribute to him. Jhankaar Beats (2003), which catapulted the music director duo Vishal–Shekhar into the limelight, is also a tribute to him. In Khwahish (2003), Mallika Sherawat's character is a Burman fan; the film features repeated references to him. In 2010, Brahmanand Singh released a 113-minute documentary titled Pancham Unmixed: Mujhe Chalte Jaana Hai, which received critical acclaim. Pancham Unmixed won 2 National Awards and was premiered at IFFLA, Los Angeles. The film is considered a landmark in documentary biopics in India and set a trend. A coffee-table book, co-authored by Brahmanand Siingh and Gaurav Sharma titled Strings of Eternity was released with Pancham Unmixed by Shemaroo. Mobius films, the producers of Pancham Unmixed, then went on to release an extended 5 hours version titled Knowing Pancham. The launch was at prestigious venue Blue Frog in Mumbai and was graced by Manoj Bajpayee, Ashutosh Gowariker, Dolly Thakore, Sachin, Atul Tiwari, Ketan Mehta, Deepa Sahi amongst others. Brahmanand and Gaurav Sharma authored another coffee-table book with the extended version, titled "Diamonds and Rust". The music of Lootera (2013) is a tribute to Burman. A number of Indian remix albums feature Burman's songs, which are also popular in the country's pubs and discos. Several of his compositions were re-mixed by the South Asian DJs in the United Kingdom and North America, and feature in popular albums such as Bally Sagoo's Bollywood Flashback. Kronos Quartet's You've Stolen My Heart (2005) contains Burman's compositions sung by his wife Asha Bhosle. In the 2012 film Khiladi 786, Himesh Reshammiya-composed song "Balma" is also a tribute to R.D. Burman.

In 1995, Filmfare Awards introduced the Filmfare RD Burman Award for New Music Talent in his memory. The award is given to upcoming music talent in Hindi cinema. In 2009, the Brihanmumbai Municipal Corporation named a public square in Santa Cruz after Burman. On the anniversary of his 77th birthday on 27 June 2016, Google dedicated a Doodle of R.D Burman on its Indian home page.

Burman inspired many later Hindi film music composers, such as Vishal–Shekhar. Jatin–Lalit are considered to have carried on Burman's legacy through the 1990s. Notable musical assistants to Burman include Manohari Singh and Sapan Chakraborty. His instrumentalists included Hari Prasad Chaurasia, Shiv Kumar Sharma, Louis Banks, Bhupinder Singh and Kersi Lord. He is also noted for his partnership with the lyricist Gulzar, who wrote the words for several of his finest compositions.

== Awards and recognitions ==
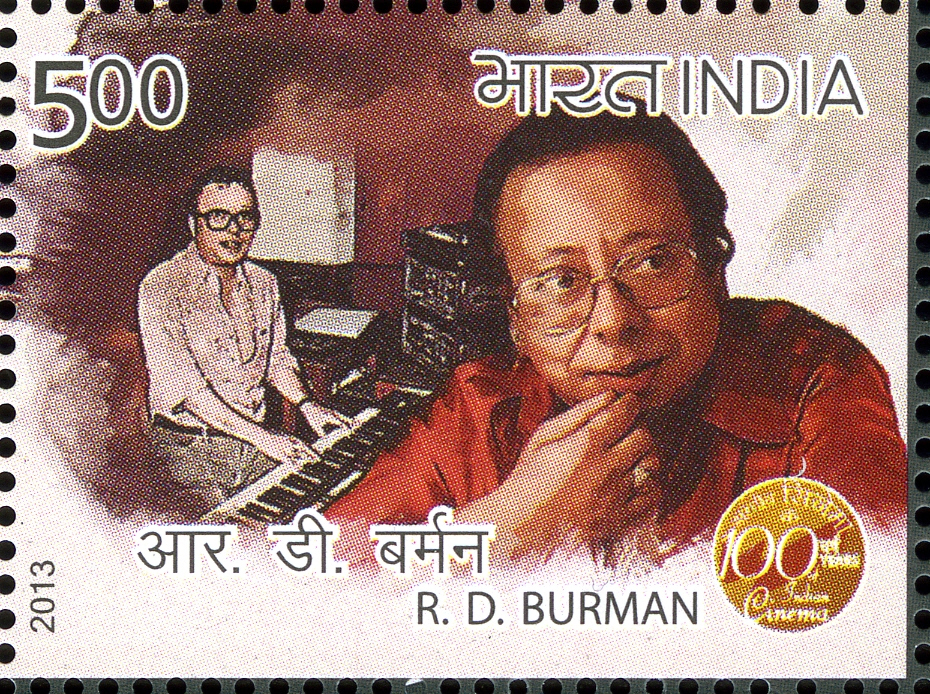
Burman on a 2013 stamp of India

Filmfare Awards

Wins

- 1983 – Best Music Director – Sanam Teri Kasam
- 1984 – Best Music Director – Masoom
- 1995 – Best Music Director – 1942: A Love Story (Posthumous)

Nominations

- 1972 – Best Music Director – Caravan
- 1973 – Best Music Director – Amar Prem
- 1974 – Best Music Director – Yaadon Ki Baaraat
- 1975 – Best Music Director – Aap Ki Kasam
- 1976 – Best Music Director – Khel Khel Mein
- 1976 – Best Music Director – Sholay
- 1976 – Best Male Playback Singer – "Mehbooba Mehbooba" from Sholay
- 1977 – Best Music Director – Mehbooba
- 1978 – Best Music Director – Hum Kisise Kum Naheen
- 1978 – Best Music Director – Kinara
- 1979 – Best Music Director – Shalimar
- 1981 – Best Music Director – Shaan
- 1982 – Best Music Director – Love Story
- 1984 – Best Music Director – Betaab
- 1985 – Best Music Director – Jawaani
- 1986 – Best Music Director – Saagar

Bengal Film Journalists' Association Awards

Win

- 1973 – Best Music Director – Hare Rama Hare Krishna
