= Edith King =

American actress (1896–1973)

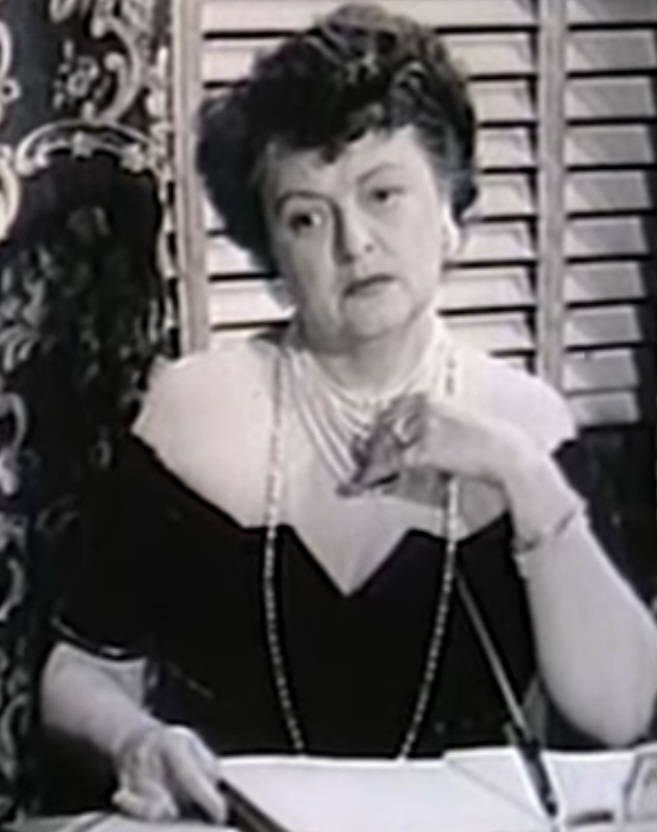
- King in an episode of Man Against Crime (1953)
- Born: Edith Keck; November 14, 1896; White Haven, Pennsylvania, U.S.
- Died: February 24, 1973 (aged 76); Daytona Beach, Florida, U.S.
- Occupation: Actress
- Years active: 1916–1967

Edith King (born Edith Keck; November 14, 1896 – February 24, 1973) was an American stage and film actress.

== Biography ==
Edith King was born Edith Keck, daughter of John Keck, in White Haven, Pennsylvania in November 14, 1896. She first visited a theater when she was 14, and decided then to pursue an acting career. She moved to New York City at a young age and promptly arranged a meeting with David Belasco, who gave her a part in his current play, Marie Odile.

In later life, King lived in Kendall Park, New Jersey, where she owned a small gift shop while continuing her acting career. In 1972 King moved from Riviera Beach to Daytona Beach, where she died on February 24, 1973.

== Career ==
King was known as a stage and film actress, with a career spanning over 50 years (from roughly 1916 to 1964). Before her stage career took off, she was an artist's model, working with Howard Chandler Christy for several of his paintings and illustrations. She appeared in theatrical productions such as Bab (playing the older sister of Helen Hayes's main character) and Thank You, and films such as Saratoga. She worked with Alfred Lunt and his wife in several productions, including The Seagull (as Polina) and The Taming of the Shrew (as the minor characters Curtis and the widow).

She played Bianca in Paul Robeson's 1943 production of Othello before taking over the role of Emilia in 1944 (replacing Margaret Webster).

== Filmography ==
Year	Title	Role	Notes
1946	Calcutta	Mrs. Smith	
1947	Blaze of Noon	Mrs. Murphy	
1948	The Gallant Blade	Mme. Chauvignac	
1948	Belle Starr's Daughter	Mrs. Allen	
1953	Girl on the Run	Lil	
