= Girl on the Run (1953 film) =

1953 film

- Directed by: Arthur J. Beckhard; Joseph Lee
- Written by: Arthur J. Beckhard; Cedric Worth
- Starring: Richard Coogan; Rosemary Pettit; Frank Albertson; Steve McQueen
- Edited by: Sidney Katz; Milton Shifman
- Production company: Rose Tree Productions
- Distributed by: Astor Pictures
- Release date: December 15, 1953
- Running time: 64 minutes
- Country: United States
- Language: English

Girl on the Run is a 1953 ultra-low-budget independent production, the plot of which drops a standard crime melodrama into the noirish, tawdry world of a carnival burlesque show. According to filmographer Michael Pitts, "Released by Astor Pictures late in 1953, Girl on the Run was filmed as The Hidden Woman. A Rose Tree Production, it opens and closes with scenes of a hysterically laughing mechanical clown and all its action takes place during one night at a tatty carnival."

The most notable cast member of Girl on the Run has one of the smallest roles: Steve McQueen, seen in the background of two scenes during his first known film role. The film also loosely inspired the hit 1971 Indian film Caravan, directed by Nasir Hussain and starring Asha Parekh.

== Plot ==
Newspaper reporter, Bill Martin, is assigned to investigate a crime ring working out of a carnival. Martin's boss is killed and Martin is framed for the murder, while the victim's girlfriend Janet goes undercover as a burlesque dancer for Lil's carny revue while running from the gangster behind the scheme.

== Cast ==
- Richard Coogan as Bill Martin
- Rosemary Pettit as Janet
- Frank Albertson as Hank
- Harry Bannister as Clay Reeves
- Edith King as Lil
- Charles Bolender as Blake

== Production ==
Arthur J. Berkhard, co-writer and co-director of the film, had a background in theater, having staged 14 Broadway productions beginning with the hit play Another Language, written by Rose Franken, in 1932. Girl on the Run would be his only film directorial credit.
