= Three Hours to Kill =

1954 film by Alfred L. Werker

- Directed by: Alfred L. Werker
- Written by: Richard Alan Simmons; Roy Huggins; Maxwell Shane
- Based on: a story by Alex Gottlieb
- Produced by: Harry Joe Brown
- Starring: Dana Andrews; Donna Reed; Dianne Foster
- Cinematography: Charles Lawton Jr.
- Edited by: Gene Havlick
- Music by: Paul Sawtell
- Color process: Technicolor
- Production company: Columbia Pictures
- Distributed by: Columbia Pictures
- Release dates: September 3, 1954 (New York City); November 4, 1954 (United States)
- Running time: 77 minutes
- Country: United States
- Language: English

Three Hours to Kill is a 1954 American Western film directed by Alfred L. Werker and starring Dana Andrews, Donna Reed and Dianne Foster.

It inspired the 1956 Roger Corman film Gunslinger.

== Plot ==
Jim Guthrie (Dana Andrews) returns to town three years after being falsely accused of murdering Carter Mastin (Richard Webb). Jim finds that his old friend Ben East (Stephen Elliott) is now the sheriff. In a flashback, Jim recounts his near-lynching by a mob convinced he had shot Carter in the back. Laurie (Donna Reed), Carter's sister, who was planning on marrying Jim, disrupts the lynching, and Jim narrowly escapes. He still bears a neck scar from his ordeal. Ben gives Jim three hours to find the true killer. Through confrontations with several of the men who had been eager to hang him, Jim is led to the guilty man.

== Cast ==
- Dana Andrews as Jim Guthrie
- Donna Reed as Laurie Mastin
- Dianne Foster as Chris Palmer
- Stephen Elliott as Sheriff Ben East
- Richard Coogan as Niles Hendricks
- Laurence Hugo as Marty Lasswell
- James Westerfield as Sam Minor
- Richard Webb as Carter Mastin
- Carolyn Jones as Polly
- Charlotte Fletcher as Betty
- Whit Bissell as Deke
- Francis McDonald as Deputy Vince

== Reception ==
In The New York Times, Howard Thompson wrote:

[This] lusterless drama adds a few mild psychological overtones to a familiar story, a varmint's return to his home town... Mr. Andrews plays the ne'er-do-well of a prairie spot called Furnace Flats...

[The] actors, as we say, acquit themselves respectively. Mr. Andrews, for instance, is bedraggled bitterness personified... As for this saga of Furnace Flats, it's flat all right, but not so hot.
