= Richard Coogan =

American actor (1914–2014)

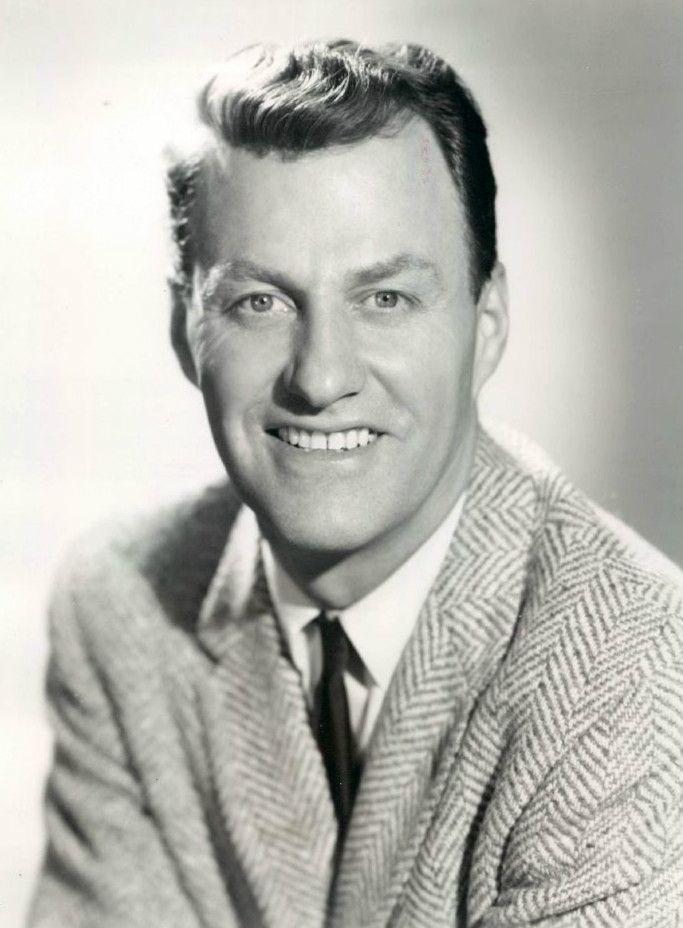
- Coogan in 1958
- Born: April 4, 1914; Madison, New Jersey, U.S.
- Died: March 12, 2014 (aged 99); Los Angeles, California, U.S.
- Occupation: Actor
- Years active: 1941–1963
- Partner: Leona
- Children: 1

Richard Charles Potter Coogan (April 4, 1914 – March 12, 2014) was an American actor best known for his portrayal of Captain Video in Captain Video and His Video Rangers from 1949 to 1950.

== Life and career ==
Born in Madison, New Jersey, Coogan worked in radio for some time, including appearing as Abie Levy in Abie's Irish Rose. He appeared on Broadway in five different productions between 1945 and 1955, all of them short-lived except for Diamond Lil with Mae West, and The Rainmaker. He was still appearing on Broadway with West when he took the role of Captain Video and His Video Rangers on the DuMont Television Network on June 27, 1949. After the live telecast each day, ending at about 7:30 pm EST, he took a cab to the theatre where Diamond Lil was playing. As the popularity of Captain Video increased, Coogan grew less and less comfortable with both the role and the very, very low budget of the production. He left Captain Video in December 1950 and was replaced by Al Hodge, who played the part until the series ended on April 1, 1955. Coogan transferred to the soap opera Love of Life, where he played the heroic Paul Raven.

Between 1954 and 1961, Coogan appeared in such films as Three Hours to Kill, The Revolt of Mamie Stover, Vice Raid, and Girl on the Run. On the NBC Western television series, The Californians (1957–1959) set in the California Gold Rush in San Francisco during the 1850s, Coogan appeared as Marshal Matthew Wayne, a character who struck most viewers and critics as a deliberate clone of Gunsmoke's Marshal Matt Dillon. His co-stars included Carole Mathews in a romantic role as the young widow Wilma Fansler and later Jeopardy! host, Art Fleming.

Coogan also had a continuing role on the police procedural series Vice Raid (1960–1961), as Sergeant Whitey Brandon. During 1951–1963 he guest-starred on a number of other television series, mainly Westerns such Gunsmoke, Laramie, Bonanza, Maverick, Stagecoach West, Cheyenne, Sugarfoot, Bronco, and Wichita Town, as well as crime dramas, such as Perry Mason, Surfside 6, and 77 Sunset Strip. In 1960 Coogan appeared as Sheriff Charley Emmett on Cheyenne in the episode titled "Alabi for the Scalped Man". In 1960 he appeared as Hank Lawson on Maverick in the episode "Thunder from the North".

He retired from film and television in 1963 following an appearance on Perry Mason as Police Sgt. Gifford in "The Case of the Shoplifter's Shoe", and his final appearance as Luke Ryan in an episode of Gunsmoke. In later life, he was best known as a professional golfer and golf instructor.

Coogan died in Los Angeles on March 12, 2014, a few weeks before his 100th birthday.

== Filmography ==
Year	Title	Role	Notes
1953	Girl on the Run	Bill Martin	
1954	Three Hours to Kill	Niles Hendricks	
1956	The Revolt of Mamie Stover	Captain Eldon Sumac	
1959	Vice Raid	Whitey Brandon	
