= Style (2001 film) =

2001 Indian film by N. Chandra

- Release poster
- Directed by: N. Chandra
- Written by: N. Chandra
- Produced by: N. Chandra
- Starring: Sahil Khan; Sharman Joshi; Riya Sen; Shillpi Sharma
- Cinematography: Manoj Gupta
- Edited by: Prashant Khedekar
- Music by: Sanjeev Darshan
- Production company: N . Chandra Global Infotainment Limited
- Distributed by: B4U Films
- Release date: 28 December 2001
- Country: India
- Language: Hindi
- Budget: ₹2.5 crore
- Box office: ₹8.84 crore

Style is a 2001 Indian Hindi-language buddy comedy thriller film directed by N. Chandra. The film stars Sharman Joshi, Sahil Khan, Riya Sen, and Shilpi Sharma. The film was released on 28 December 2001, and was a sleeper hit, earning ₹8.84 crore at the box-office against its budget of ₹2.5 crore.

A sequel titled Xcuse Me was released in 2003.

== Plot ==
The film revolves around two slap-happy college students, Bantu/Nehal and Chantu/Amit, who stand out in the college for their expertise in ragging and playing pranks, and their ability to outfox others. As their college life nears an end, the duo begins to realize that they need to start getting more serious about their life and career. Realising that they are not cut out for a life of struggle and hard work, Bantu comes up with an idea to trick two rich girls into marrying them so that they can spend their lives comfortably which leads them to focus their attention on rich teenyboppers Sheena and Rani and set about wooing the two girls to win their love and ultimately the key to becoming rich. A mysterious woman named Nikki Malhotra enters the scene, and pretty soon Chantu and Bantu get embroiled in a murder mystery.

== Cast ==
- Sahil Khan as Nehal Satpute (Chantu)
- Sharman Joshi as Amit Kharbanda (Bantu)
- Riya Sen as Sheena
- Shillpi Sharma as Rani
- Varsha Usgaonkar as Inspector
- Tara Deshpande as Nikki Malhotra
- Darshan Jariwala as Principal Sardesai
- Shakti Kapoor as Suresh Bhagwat
- Vishwajeet Pradhan as Nayansukh
- Neelu Kohli as Bantu's Mother
- Atul Parchure as Manager
- Sikandar Kharbanda as Dinesh
- Rajkumar Kanojia as Sharad Kandi Bhagwat
- Lilliput as Hostel Manager
- Puneet Vashisht as Vicky
- Rinke Ali Khan as Savitri

== Soundtrack ==
The soundtrack was composed by Sanjeev Darshan. The lyrics are written by Nitin Raikwar, Tejpal Kaur and Abbas Katka.

Song	Singer	Lyrics
"Excuse Me"	Nitin Raikwar, Nisha, Simmi	Nitin Raikwar
"Jaan Meri Jaan Hai Tu"	Sapna Mukherjee, Mohini	Abbas Katka
"Miss Dil And Mister Dil"	Hema Sardesai, KK	Nitin Raikwar
"Mohabbat Ho Na Jaye"	Hema Sardesai, Abhijeet, Udit Narayan	Abbas Katka
"Ye Hai Style"	Abhijeet, KK	Tejpal Kaur
"Mohabbat Ho Na Jaye (II)"	Udit Narayan, Sunidhi Chauhan	Abbas Katka
"Style Mein Rehne Ka"	Sonu Nigam, Vinod Rathod	Nitin Raikwar
"Theme Music (Instrumental)"		

== Reception ==
Taran Adarsh of IndiaFM gave the film 1 out of 5, writing, "Performance-wise, Sharman Joshi is likeable and delivers a convincing performance. Saahil Khan makes a decent debut. Riya Sen looks like a doll looks, but needs to brush up her acting skills. Shilpi Mudgal is not up to the mark. Varsha Usgaonker is okay in a brief role. Tara Deshpande overacts. Shakti Kapoor is wasted in a brief role. On the whole, STYLE is just about an average fare."

== Sequel ==
A sequel Xcuse Me was released in 2003.
