= My Love Story (2013 film) =

- Directed by: Deepak Panda
- Starring: Deepak Panda; Katrine Kovi; Riya Sen
- Release date: 1 March 2013
- Country: India
- Language: Odia

My Love Story is an Odia film was released on 1 March 2013. Riya Sen appears in an item song.

== Cast ==
- Deepak Panda
- Katrine Kovi
- Mihir Das
- Riya Sen as an item number

== Soundtrack ==
The music was composed by Gagan Bihari and released by Anhad Studio.

My Love Story

Soundtrack album by Gagan Bihari
- Released: 28 Jun 2013
- Recorded: 2013
- Genre: Soundtrack
- Length: 30:58
- Label: Anhad Studio
- Producer: Gagan Bihari

Track list
No.	Title	Lyrics	Singer(s)	Length
1.	"My Love Story"	Mohit Chakrabarty	Udit Narayan, Tarannum Mallik	4:49
2.	"Chhamak Chhalo"	Jatindra Pradhan	Vinod Rathod, Tarannum Mallik	5:29
3.	"Tu Mo Pain"	Deepak Panda	Shaan	4:49
4.	"My Heart Beats"	Mohit Chakrabarty	Babul Supriyo, Tapu Mishra	4:04
5.	"Na Jeen Huwe Na"	Jatindra Pradhan	Krishna Beura	6:21
6.	"My Love Story (Sad)"	Mohit Chakrabarty	Udit Narayan, Tarannum Mallik	1:37
7.	"Ghain Ghain Kala Joda Toka"	Gagan Bihari	Mohit Chakrabarty	4:13
Total length:				30:58
