= Sab Moh Maaya Hai =

Indian Hindi-language family drama film

- Theatrical release poster
- Directed by: Abhinav Pareek
- Written by: Alok Shukla
- Produced by: Kamlesh Bhanushali; Vinod Bhanushali; Deepak Diwan; Vishal Gurnani
- Starring: Sharman Joshi; Annu Kapoor
- Cinematography: Anubhav Bansal
- Edited by: Tanya Chhabria
- Music by: Amol Shrivastava; Abhishek Talented
- Production companies: Bhanushali Studios Limited; Insomnia Films; Veda Film Factory
- Release date: 2023
- Country: India
- Language: Hindi

Sab Moh Maaya Hai is a 2023 Hindi-language family drama film directed by Abhinav Pareek and produced by Vinod Bhanushali under Bhanushali Studios Limited. The film stars Sharman Joshi, Annu Kapoor, Tanmay Nagar, and Harry Meena in lead roles.

Initially slated for a theatrical release in 2022, the film faced distribution challenges and eventually premiered directly on television on 18 November 2023. The story revolves around a father-son relationship strained by conflicting aspirations and societal pressures, culminating in a journey of self-realization and familial reconciliation.

== Synopsis ==
The film centers on Ramnaresh Mishra (Annu Kapoor), a low-income peon working at the District Collectorate in Ujjain, Madhya Pradesh, who is nearing retirement. His son, Piyush (Sharman Joshi), resents their modest lifestyle and blames India's reservation policies for his inability to secure a government job. Frustrated, Piyush suggests that Ramnaresh's death before retirement could allow him to claim a job through a compassionate appointment scheme. However, as tensions escalate, Piyush gradually recognizes the emotional toll of his demands and reevaluates his priorities, ultimately understanding the irreplaceable value of his father's love and sacrifices.

== Cast ==
- Sharman Joshi as Piyush, Ramnaresh's ambitious son
- Annu Kapoor as Ramnaresh Mishra, a peon struggling with familial and financial burdens
- Tanmay Nagar as Tannu, a village boy
- Harry Meena as a reporter
- Rohit Chaudhary as Raju
- Nishad Raj Rana as Ashfaq

== Release and controversy ==
Originally scheduled for a theatrical release in 2022, Sab Moh Maaya Hai encountered setbacks when distributors declined to acquire it. The producers then tried to sell its OTT rights but found no buyers, As a result, the film's release was delayed, and after over a year, it was eventually released directly on television on 18 November 2023. Industry analysts speculated that its sensitive subject matter and lack of commercial appeal contributed to the distribution hurdles.
