= Negar Khan =

Iranian-born Norwegian actress

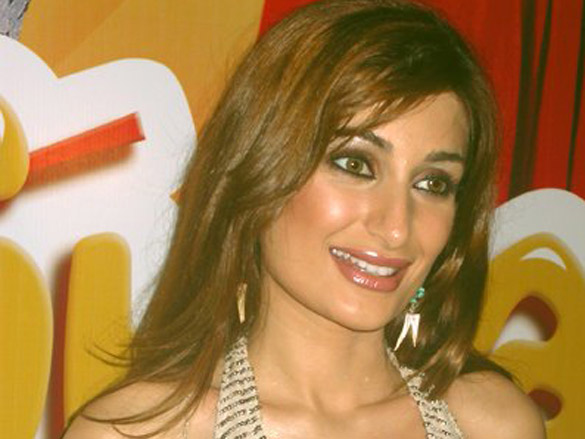
- Khan in 2004
- Born: Tabriz, Iran
- Other name: Nigar Khan
- Occupations: Actress; model
- Years active: 2004–2009; 2012
- Spouse: Sahil Khan (m. 2004; div. 2005)

Negar Khan (also credited as Nigar Khan) is an Iranian-born Norwegian actress. She is best known for her Bollywood item songs and film work.

== Personal life ==
Khan is fluent in the Persian, Azeri, Norwegian, English and Urdu languages. Khan has a bachelor's degree in marketing & advertising, and two master's degrees in international business and film & television.

She married Sahil Khan on September 21, 2004, but divorced in July 2005. In 2009, she had a new romance with someone from India while keeping a low profile.

== Career ==
Khan gained fame when she appeared in the music video of a remix of the classic Indian Hindi movie song "Chadti Jawani Meri Chaal Mastani". She was a contestant in the Norwegian version of the Paradise Hotel reality show, where she was accused of having multiple plastic surgeries. She claimed that she had not undergone any surgery.

== Filmography ==
Movies
Year	Title	Role	Notes	Ref.
2004	Rudraksh			
2004	Shaadi Ka Laddoo	Sheena		
2004	Ab... Bas!		Special appearance in "Kehta Hai Mera Dil"	
2005	Double Cross" Ek Dhoka			
2005	Taj Mahal: An Eternal Love Story			
2006	Hello? Kaun Hai/Jaan Leva			
2006	Vita Smeralda			
2012	3 Bachelors		Special appearance	

Television
Year	Title	Role	Ref.
2009	Paradise Hotel	Contestant	
2009	I'm a Celebrity...Get Me Out of Here!	Contestant	
2009	Iss Jungle Se Mujhe Bachao	Contestant	

Music videos
Year	Album	Song	Singer(s)
2002	Aur Ek Haseena Thi	"Chadti Jawani Remix"	DJ Aqeel, DJ Doll
2003	Deadly Dance Mix	"Rama Rama Gazab Hui Gava Re Remix"	DJ Jawahar
2004	DJ Hot Remix Vol.2 & The Return Of The Kaanta Mix	"Chadti Jawani Remix"	DJ Aqeel, DJ Doll
2004	DJ Hot Remix Vol.3	"Aap Jaisa Koi Remix" and "Chhod Do Aanchal Zamaanaa Kyaa Kahegaa Remix"	DJ Hot
2004	Sweet Honey Mix	"Sundar Pari Hoon Main Motiyon Kii Ladi Hoon Main Remix"	DJ Hot
2004	War Of DJ's Vol 2	"Jalta Hai Jiiya Meraa Bheegi Bhaagi Raaton Mein Remix"	DJ Hot
2004	Maal Bhari Aahe - DJ Hot Remix	"Nako Uga Tu Maru Boba"	DJ Hot
2005	Kajra Nite Remix	"Apni Toh Jaisay Taisay Remix"	DJ Hot

== Controversies ==
Khan allegedly posed topless for the Norwegian men's magazine VI Menn in 2004. She denied this and said that the pictures had been graphically manipulated.

She was deported from India to Norway in February 2005 for allegedly providing false documents to procure her work visa. She had been working while on tourist visa. However, she and Sahil Khan claimed that she had married him and hence was eligible to become an Indian national.
