= 3 Bachelors =

- Poster
- Directed by: Ajai Sinha
- Produced by: Pramod Sharma
- Starring: Sharman Joshi; Manish Nagpal; Manoj Pahwa; Himani Shivpuri; Raima Sen; Riya Sen
- Music by: Daboo Malik
- Production companies: UV News Media & Communication Limited
- Release date: 29 June 2012
- Country: India
- Language: Hindi

3 Bachelors is a 2012 Indian Hindi-language romantic comedy film directed by Ajai Sinha and starring Sharman Joshi, Manish Nagpal and Manoj Pahwa in the titular roles with Himani Shivpuri, Raima Sen and Riya Sen.

== Cast ==
- Sharman Joshi as Amit
- Manoj Pahwa as Deepak Verma
- Himani Shivpuri as Shalini Devi
- Manish Nagpal as Jai
- Raima Sen as Neha
- Riya Sen as Nisha
- Master Shalin as Jeetu
- Master Kashish as Meetu
- Negar Khan as an item number in "Dhoom Dham"

== Production ==
The film began production in 2003 but was delayed for nine years. It became ready for release a month after the success of Ferrari Ki Sawaari (2012), also starring Sharman Joshi. The makers of Ferrari Ki Sawaari sent a legal notice to the makers of this film for "piggyback[ing]" on that film to promote this one.

== Soundtrack ==
The music was composed by Daboo Malik. The songs were shot in Mumbai and Pattaya, Thailand.

Track listing
No.	Title	Lyrics	Singer(s)	Length
1.	"Dil Dag Mag Dag Mag"	Praveen Bhardwaj	Shaan, Sunidhi Chauhan	5:05
2.	"Dhoom Dham"	Rekha Mistry	Kalpana, Arvinder Singh	1:27
3.	"Shankariya Shankariya"	Praveen Bhardwaj	Vinod Rathore, Mou Mukherje	5:34
Total length:				12:06

== Reception ==
A critic from The Times of India wrote that "There are a couple of one liners (out-and-out adult, mind you) and moments that manage to make you laugh, somewhat. But then it’s all in flashes, primarily in the first half".
