= 3 Idiots (soundtrack) =

2009 soundtrack album by Shantanu Moitra

Soundtrack album by Shantanu Moitra
- Released: 27 November 2009
- Genre: Feature film soundtrack
- Length: 29:22
- Language: Hindi
- Labels: T-Series (2009-2021); Zee Music Company (2021-present)
- Producer: Shantanu Moitra

Shantanu Moitra chronology
Phir Kabhi (2009)	3 Idiots (2009)	Well Done Abba (2010)

3 Idiots is the soundtrack to the 2009 Indian Hindi-language film of the same name written and directed by Rajkumar Hirani and co-written by Abhijat Joshi. The soundtrack featured five original songs and two remixes composed and produced by Shantanu Moitra and lyrics written by Swanand Kirkire.

The soundtrack album was released by T-Series on 27 November 2009, to positive reviews from critics praising Moitra's composition and it was one of the "highest-selling Bollywood soundtrack of 2009". The album received two National Film Awards, six International Indian Film Academy Awards, five Global Indian Music Academy Awards and one nomination at the Filmfare Awards. The track "Aal Izz Well" was one of the "Top 10 Bollywood songs of the year" and became a sensation among the younger generation in that period. It was later re-released by Zee Music Company in 2021.

== Background ==
According to Shantanu Moitra, the album of 3 Idiots was curated with the inspiration of his college days. Each tracks had been written from a state of mind of the youth. Moitra said that "it has been one of the most complex ones on this film, and that is because we were talking about the youth, and there has been no more complex creature on the face of the Earth than the youth". Swanand Kirkire was the primary lyricist of the film and had involved during its scripting stage. The album had five original songs curated and two tracks being remixed. Sonu Nigam was the primary playback singer, rendering five out of seven tracks. The song "Jaane Nahin Denge Tujhe" was recorded in one take from start to finish.

"Give Me Some Sunshine" is the first song composed for the film. The track was sung by Suraj Jagan and Sharman Joshi (one of the leads in the film), thereby making his singing debut. Another track "Aal Izz Well" being pictured on the lead actors at a college hostel. It is a "fun track", which also shares thought about the philosophy and mindset of students. Instead of using musical instruments, Shantanu used to record the track with bottles, plates and tables. "Zoobi Doobi" is a "sweet melody track", pictured on Aamir and Kareena Kapoor which had a "retro vibe". Shantanu Moitra said the track "is kind of a tribute to the great Hindi film love songs" and also praised its picturisation.

== Track listing ==
All lyrics written by Swanand Kirkire, all music composed by Shantanu Moitra. Remixes composed and arranged by DJ A-Myth and Darshan.

No.	Title	Artist(s)	Length
1.	"Aal Izz Well"	Sonu Nigam; Swanand Kirkire; Shaan	4:36
2.	"Zoobi Doobi"	Nigam; Shreya Ghoshal	4:06
3.	"Behti Hawa Sa Tha Woh"	Shaan; Shantanu Moitra	5:02
4.	"Give Me Some Sunshine"	Suraj Jagan; Sharman Joshi	4:07
5.	"Jaane Nahin Denge Tujhe"	Sonu Nigam	3:31
6.	"Aal Izz Well Remix"	Nigam; Kirkire; Shaan	4:41
7.	"Zoobi Doobi Remix"	Nigam; Ghoshal	3:28

== Release ==
A unique promotional activity was conducted for the film, with its music being launched on the internet instead of a grand event for the music release. On 27 November 2009, the makers of the film released the audio on the official website of the film, idiotsacademy.com, and in addition, the cast and crew members organised a video chat for the fans. Though Aamir Khan initially disapproved the idea of a low-key music launch, he felt that the unique promotion may work in favour of the film. Song promos were aired in television channels and online streaming sites during December 2009, prior to the film's release. T-Series purchased the music rights of the film at an amount of ₹120 million (US$1.2 million), while initial reports falsely slated that Sony Music had gained acquisition for the marketing of the film's soundtrack. The company released the audio CDs for purchasing online on the day of its music launch, and later released it in stores, which had a 22-page booklet of stills from the film and song lyrics and credits in tri-fold cover.

A two-sided vinyl LP record-disc format was released by T-Series during mid-2010, included the seven tracks with a remix in each side of the record-disc. In addition, the track "Kaise Mujhe" composed by A. R. Rahman for Ghajini (2008), which also had Aamir Khan in the lead, and the same music company distributed the album, was featured in the B-side of the LP record. The songs were attached with the "Premium" and "Collector's Edition" discs launched by Reliance Big Home Video during early-October and late-November 2010. In April 2021, Zee Music Company acquired the rights and re-released the soundtrack in streaming and digital music platforms.

== Critical reception ==
Joginder Tuteja of Bollywood Hungama gave 3.5 stars (out of 5) stating it as "a good quality album" and "the strength of the film which translates in the box-office success". Sukanya Verma of Rediff.com, gave three out of five saying "3 Idiots isn't for the ready-steady-go listener. But if you pay this short 'n' sweet soundtrack some extra bit of attention, its curious tunes are bound to grow on you."

Indo-Asian News Service-based critic writing for Hindustan Times said that "the album is a good mix of slow and fast-paced songs. Shantanu Moitra has scored quality music that has melody and generates lots of interest." In a review published by BBC, Jaspreet Pandohar stated it as "Bollywood’s most playful soundtrack". Anand Vaishnav of News18 stated that "the album is not an instant chartbuster like Ghajini. But like Rang De Basanti, if the movie clicks, the tracks will justify their meaning." Music Aloud's Vipin Nair said "Shantanu Moitra delivers a soundtrack that is mostly the typical Moitra fare, simple hummable kind of tunes with the occasional retro touch. But being an Aamir Khan movie one might have hoped for more variety." The review published by The Hindu stated that Kirkire's lyrics were the main highlight of the album. The songs "Aal Izz Well" and "Zoobi Doobi" were appreciated.

== Sales and records ==
According to the Indian trade website Box Office India, the album was the highest-selling Bollywood soundtrack of 2009, with about 1.5 million sales. Despite the decline of music sales in CD format, the album was the "most-downloaded Hindi musical album of the year". The album topped the charts for 12 consecutive weeks. Many top websites published it as "one of the top Hindi albums of 2009", with "Aal Izz Well" subsequently being listed in the "Top 10 Bollywood Songs of 2009" by The Times of India and Sify. Tatsam Mukherjee of HuffPost, who listed it as one among the "Top 20 Bollywood Albums since 2000" for the edition published in 2020. It has still been considered as one of Moitra's best works till date.

== Accolades ==
Award	Category	Recipients	Result	Ref.
Filmfare Awards	Best Female Playback Singer	Shreya Ghoshal – ("Zoobi Doobi")	Nominated	
Global Indian Music Academy Awards	Best Film Album	3 Idiots – Shantanu Moitra	Won	
Global Indian Music Academy Awards	Best Male Playback Singer	Shaan, Shantanu Moitra – ("Behti Hawa Sa Tha Woh")	Won	
Global Indian Music Academy Awards	Best Lyricist	Swanand Kirkire – ("Behti Hawa Sa Tha Woh")	Won	
Global Indian Music Academy Awards	Best Sound Engineer	Bishwadeep Chatterjee, Anup Dev	Won	
Global Indian Music Academy Awards	Most Popular Song	"Aal Izz Well" – Sonu Nigam, Shaan, Swanand Kirkire	Won	
Ghanta Awards	Worst Song	"Aal Izz Well"	Won	
International Indian Film Academy Awards	Best Music Director	Shantanu Moitra	Nominated	
International Indian Film Academy Awards	Best Lyrics	Swanand Kirkire	Won	
International Indian Film Academy Awards	Best Male Playback Singer	Shaan – ("Behti Hawa Sa Tha Woh")	Won	
International Indian Film Academy Awards	Best Male Playback Singer	Sonu Nigam – ("Aal Izz Well")	Nominated	
International Indian Film Academy Awards	Best Female Playback Singer	Shreya Ghoshal – ("Zoobi Doobi")	Nominated	
International Indian Film Academy Awards	Best Background Score	Sanjay Wanderkar, Atul Raninga, Shantanu Moitra	Won	
International Indian Film Academy Awards	Best Sound Recording	Bishwadeep Chatterjee, Nihal Ranjan Samel	Won	
International Indian Film Academy Awards	Best Sound Re-Recording	Anup Dev	Won	
National Film Awards	Best Lyrics	Swanand Kirkire – ("Behti Hawa Sa Tha Woh")	Won	
National Film Awards	Best Audiography	Anup Dev	Won	
