= Aladin (film) =

2009 Indian film by Sujoy Ghosh

- Theatrical release poster
- Directed by: Sujoy Ghosh
- Written by: Sujoy Ghosh; Ritesh Shah
- Produced by: Sujoy Ghosh; Sunil A Lulla
- Starring: Amitabh Bachchan; Sanjay Dutt; Ritesh Deshmukh; Jacqueline Fernandez
- Narrated by: Boman Irani
- Cinematography: Sirsha Ray
- Edited by: Suresh Pai
- Music by: Score: Jody J Jenkins; Songs: Vishal–Shekhar
- Production company: Boundscript Motion Pictures
- Distributed by: Eros International
- Release date: 30 October 2009
- Running time: 131 minutes
- Country: India
- Language: Hindi
- Box office: est. ₹10.89 crore

Aladin is a 2009 Indian Hindi-language fantasy action comedy film directed by Sujoy Ghosh. The film stars Amitabh Bachchan, Sanjay Dutt, Riteish Deshmukh (as the title character) and Jacqueline Fernandez (in her film debut). The film was an adaptation of the Marathi play Pati Sagle Uchapati which itself is based on Right Bed, Wrong Husband written by Neil Schaffner and Caroline Shaffner.

== Plot ==
The film opens with the family of archeologist Arun Chatterjee, who lives with his wife, Riya, and their baby son, Aladin. When out on a holiday, Arun is attacked by a gang searching for a magic lamp, which Arun has found, but has hidden somewhere. Arun and Riya Chatterjee are murdered; Aladin is raised by his grandfather. After his granddad's death, a now grown-up Aladin Chatterjee (Ritesh Deshmukh) lives in the fictional city of Khwaish (wish). He is lonely, and Kasim (Sahil Khan) and his gang members have bullied Aladin since his childhood. His life changes when Jasmine (Jacqueline Fernandez) enters the city, and Aladin immediately falls for her.

Kasim arranges a birthday party for Aladin, and as a present, Jasmine gives Aladin a magic lamp for his birthday because Kasim said that Aladin loves lamps to embarrass him in front of Jasmine. However, this lamp turns out to be the magic lamp that the murderers of Aladin's parents were trying to find. Aladin rubs the lamp and releases the genie, Genius (Amitabh Bachchan). Desperate to grant him three wishes so that his contract with the magic lamp can end, the rock-star Genius suddenly makes Aladin's life very interesting but chaotic. Aladin does not want to make any wish, but Genius enters Aladin's dreams and finds out what he wants, getting his sleeping mind to make a wish: to make Jasmine fall in love with him. When he wakes up, he does not like what Genius has done and uses his second wish to turn Jasmine into normal. His third wish is for Genius to help him woo Jasmine without using magic to make it happen. Genius does his best, but magic is really his strong suit. Still, with Genius's help, Aladin stands up to Kasim and starts a relationship with Jasmine, and Genius teaches Kasim a lesson. Aladin's future looks perfect, until the real threat looms on the horizon - the ex-genie, Ringmaster (Sanjay Dutt).

Ringmaster in disguise visits Aladin and informs him that Genius has killed his parents. Aladin insults Genius and tells him to leave. Ringmaster steals the magic lamp and wishes for Genius to kill Aladin, but Genius refuses to do it, and loses his magical powers because he did not grant the wish, just as Ringmaster had planned. Aladin learns that Genius is innocent and arrives to help him, and they succeed in rescuing Jasmine. Ringmaster's plan is then completely revealed: he plans to perform a ritual to steal the reflection of an approaching comet, getting back his genie powers as a result. Genius, Aladdin and Jasmine intervene, and Aladdin steals the comet's reflection, giving genie powers back to Genius instead of Ringmaster. Genius seals Ringmaster inside a mirror and then shatters it, defeating him. The Ringmaster's gang is also defeated.

In the end, the trio happily gets back to the city, Aladin and Jasmine are a couple, and after earning special superpowers from the comet, Aladin gives Kasim yet another lesson.

== Cast ==
- Amitabh Bachchan as Genius
- Sanjay Dutt as Ringmaster
- Riteish Deshmukh as Aladin "Aloo" Chatterjee
  - Dev Kantawala as young Aladin
  - Shubhankar Atre as Child Aladin
- Jacqueline Fernandez as Jasmine
- Sahil Khan as Kasim Kejriwal
- Ratna Pathak Shah as Marjina
- Victor Banerjee as Mr. Chaterjee
- Joy Sengupta as Arun Chaterjee
- Sohini Ghosh as Riya Chaterjee
- Arif Zakaria as Professor Nazir
- William Ong as Xi Guang Lee
- Erina Adrianna as Fire Breathing Lady

== Soundtrack ==
Aladin

Soundtrack album by Vishal–Shekhar
- Released: 16 July 2009
- Recorded: Eros Now
- Genre: Feature film soundtrack
- Length: 35:42
- Label: Eros Music
- Producer: Vishal–Shekhar

Vishal–Shekhar chronology
Dostana (2008)	Aladin (2009)	12 The Movie (2009)

The music of the film is composed by Vishal–Shekhar, with lyrics penned by Vishal Dadlani and Anvita Dutt Guptan.

No.	Title	Artist(s)	Length
1.	"Genie Rap"	Amitabh Bachchan, Anushka Manchanda	2:57
2.	"Tak Dhina Dhin"	Shankar Mahadevan, Shaan	4:32
3.	"Ore Saawariya"	Amitabh Bachchan, Sudesh Bhonsle, Shreya Ghoshal, Shaan	4:28
4.	"You May Be"	Vishal Dadlani, Shekhar Ravjiani	5:43
5.	"Bachke O Bachke"	Shankar Mahadevan, Shaan, Sunidhi Chauhan, Vishal Dadlani	5:20
6.	"Giri Giri"	Sanjay Dutt	3:11
7.	"Genie Rap" (Remix -DJ Suketu feat. Aks)	Amitabh Bachchan, Anushka Manchanda	5:24
8.	"Ore Saawariya" (Remix -DJ Suketu feat. Aks)	Amitabh Bachchan, Sudesh Bhonsle, Shreya Ghoshal, Shaan	4:07

== Reception ==
=== Box office ===
Aladin grossed an estimated ₹10.0 crore (US$1.0 million).

=== Critical response ===
Taran Adarsh's one star review for Bollywood Hungama stated, "On the whole, ALADIN is a terrible waste of a terrific opportunity. Hugely disappointing!." Mayank Shekhar of Hindustan Times stated, "At 65, Amitabh Bachchan's on-screen presence is likely to get scarcer with age. Audiences are still interested in his work. If only he wouldn't green-light unbelievable, hollow, expensive rubbish that'd be pelted on us merely because, he said yes." Kaveree Bamzai of India Today wrote, "Despite the Rs 80 crore of special effects wasted on the film, Aladin has neither magic nor is it magical."

== Awards ==
- Stardust Awards - Best Female Debut - Jacqueline Fernandez
- IIFA Award for Star Debut of the Year – Female - Jacqueline Fernandez
- IIFA Best Art Direction Award - Sabu Cyril
- IIFA Award for Best Special Effects - Charles Darby (Eyecube Labs)
