= Teesra Kaun (1965 film) =

Indian thriller film

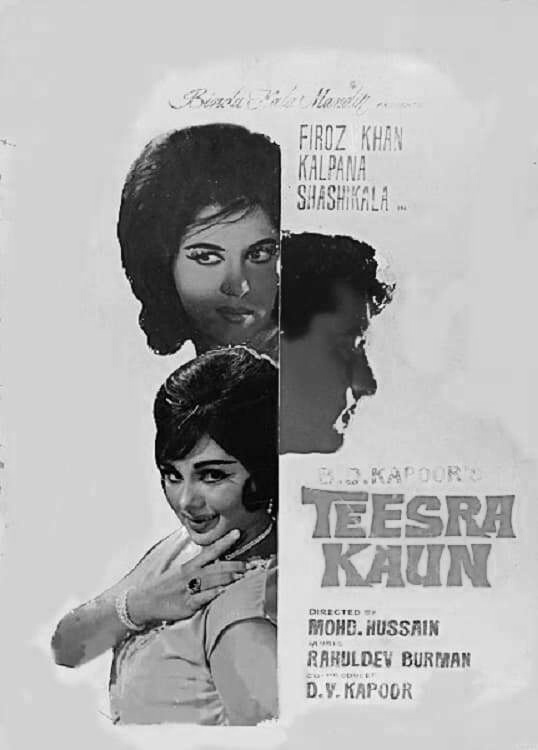
- Directed by: Mohammed Hussain
- Written by: Bal Kishan Mouj
- Produced by: B.D. Kapoor
- Starring: Feroz Khan, Kalpana Mohan, Shashikala
- Cinematography: Aloke Dasgupta
- Edited by: Kamlakar Karkhanis
- Music by: R.D. Burman
- Release date: 1965
- Running time: 155 minutes
- Country: India
- Language: Hindi

Teesra Kaun is a 1965 Hindi thriller. directed by Mohammed Hussain, known for its engaging storyline and suspenseful narrative.. The film combines melodious music with a gripping screenplay, making it a noteworthy entry in the landscape of Indian cinema during the 1960s.

== Plot ==
Prakash enjoys a comfortable life in Bombay with his widowed mother and sister, Renuka, who is about to marry Dindayal, the sole heir of widower businessman Mukatlal. Just before the wedding can be finalized, Prakash suddenly disappears, leading the police to inform Mukatlal that his house has been robbed of diamonds worth Rs. 8 lakhs. Mukatlal's servant claims he can identify Prakash as one of the five thieves, prompting the police to launch a manhunt for him and resulting in the cancellation of the wedding. When Prakash returns, he tells his family and girlfriend, Shoba, that he has been wrongfully accused and is determined to prove his innocence to Mukatlal. However, soon after, his mother receives the shocking news that Mukatlal has been murdered, and her son has become the prime suspect.

== Cast ==
- Feroz Khan as "Prakash"
- Shyam Kumar as "Khanna"
- Shashikala as Lily
- Ram Singh as "Paul"
- Sulochana Latkar as "Mrs. Khanna"
- Kamal Mehra as "Deenu"

== Production ==
Teesra Kaun was produced by B.D. Kapoor., a well-known filmmaker and special effects artist in the Indian film industry. The movie combines elements of a whodunit with Bollywood's typical song-and-dance format, blending suspense, action, and drama. Feroz Khan's performance as the wrongfully accused protagonist was widely appreciated, establishing him as a star in suspense thrillers. Pran, known for his villainous roles, adds to the tension and intrigue.

== Music ==
The film's music was composed by R.D. Burman, contributing memorable songs to the film's soundtrack. Burman's music enhances the mystery and drama, with tracks that reflect the film's tense atmosphere and the emotional highs of its characters.

== Tracklist ==
Teesra Kaun Film Songs
No.	Title	Lead vocals	Length
01	Achha Sanam Kar Le Sitam	Asha Bhosle	3:29
02	Meri Jaan Tu Khafa Hai To Kya Hua	Mohammed Rafi	3:04
03	Meri Saheliyan Byahi Gai Sari	Suman Kalyanpur	3:15
04	O Dilruba O Tu Muskura	Asha Bhosle	3:20
05	Pyar Ka Fasana Banale Dil Diwana	Mukesh and Lata Mangeshkar	3:57
