= Ramaa: The Saviour =

2010 film by Hadi Ali Abrar

- Theatrical release poster
- Directed by: Hadi Ali Abrar
- Written by: Reshu Nath; Krupasagar Sridharan
- Produced by: Paul London
- Starring: Sahil Khan; Tanushree Dutta; Meghan Jadhav; Dalip Singh Rana
- Cinematography: Sejal Shah
- Edited by: Peter Heins
- Music by: Siddharth-Suhas
- Production company: Good Willing Entertainment
- Release date: 12 November 2010
- Country: India
- Language: Hindi

Ramaa: The Saviour is a 2010 Indian fantasy action adventure film produced by Paul London, written by Reshu Nath, and directed by Hadi Ali Abrar. The film stars Sahil Khan, Dalip Singh Rana, and Tanushree Dutta.

== Plot ==
Komal, Kunal (Komal's brother), Sameer, and Riddhi's siblings – Rohan and Sanjh – participate in a dance competition whose winners will be given the recently released video game "The Last Battle." They win the competition and are sent to the game room to play the game. When they start playing, they get sucked into the game and stranded on a vast prehistoric island. They fend for themselves against wild animals and deadly gem-seekers until they meet a wild man named Ramaa who lives in a jungle hut. He gives them food and shelter, and eventually helps them leave the island by building them a small boat. Problems arise when Kunal is kidnapped by Kaali, who is looking for the power to rule the world with the help of three stones which control the mind, body, and soul.

== Cast ==
- Sahil Khan as Ramaa
- Tanushree Dutta as Samaraa
- Dalip Singh Rana as Vali
- Meghan Jadhav as Rohan
- Ananya Shukla as Komal
- Ishita Panchal as Riddhi
- Arjun Nandwani as Sameer
- Koustuv Ghosh as Kunal
- Zankhi Pabari as Sanjh
- Taleb Ibrahim as Kaali

== Soundtrack ==
The music was composed by Siddharth-Suhas and released by Sony Music India.

Ramaa: The Saviour

Soundtrack album by Siddharth-Suhas
- Released: 25 October 2010
- Recorded: 2010
- Genre: Soundtrack
- Length: 31:04
- Label: Sony Music India
- Producer: Siddharth-Suhas

Track list
| No. | Title | Lyrics | Singer(s) | Length |
|---|---|---|---|---|
| 1. | "We Don't Need (Tumhara Bhashan)" | Suhas, Kumaar | Suraj Jagan, Suhaas Shetty, Dilip Singh Rana, Anushka Manchanda | 4:14 |
| 2. | "Sar Sar Sar Sarayein" | Kumaar | Suraj Jagan | 5:03 |
| 3. | "Baam Cheek Cheek" | Kishore Kumar | Amit Kumar, Koustuv Ghosh, Arpana, Armaan Malik | 4:30 |
| 4. | "Sunlena Sunlena" | Kumaar | Armaan Malik, Rachel Singh, Arpana, Koustuv Ghosh, Shweta Pandit | 5:14 |
| 5. | "Sunlena Sunlena" (solo) | Kumaar | KK | 4:57 |
| 6. | "Tumhara Bhashan" (Remix) | Kumaar | Koustav Ghosh, Rachel Singh, Shweta Pandit, Arpana, Armaan Malik | 4:31 |
| 7. | "Ramaa" (Title Theme) | | Instrumental | 2:35 |
| Total length: | | | | 31:04 |

== Reception ==
The Times of India gave the film 2 out of 5, praising the production values but criticising plot. Komal Nahta of Koimoi.com praised the stunts and locations but criticised the script. He further wrote, "On the whole, Ramaa The Saviour is a weak fare with bleak chances at the box-office. Its poor promotion will add to its tale of woes." Daniel Pinto of Daily News and Analysis gave the film 2 out of 5, writing, "Ramaa isn't the stuff of a classic. This is because of the limitations of the script where weirdness exits arbitrarily and the characters don't evolve much." Bollywood Hungama gave the film 1 out of 5 writing, "On the whole,’Ramaa-The Saviour’ isn’t convincing."
