= Poker Game =

Poker game may refer to:

- A game of poker, a type of card game
- Poker Game, a pricing game on The Price Is Right
- "The Poker Game" (How I Met Your Mother), a 2013 episode of How I Met Your Mother
- "The Poker Game" (Married... with Children episode), a 1987 episode of Married... with Children

== See also ==
- Poker (disambiguation)
