= Piya Tu Ab To Aja =

1971 Hindi cinema song

- A still from the music video, featuring Helen

Single by Asha Bhosle featuring R. D. Burman

from the album Caravan
- Released: 1971
- Recorded: 1971
- Studio: Unknown
- Genre: World music, Filmi, Pop-folk
- Length: 5:25
- Label: Saregama
- Songwriters: Majrooh Sultanpuri (lyrics), R. D. Burman (music)
- Producer: R. D. Burman

"Piya Tu Ab To Aja" (transl. 'Come to me now, my love') is a single by Indian playback singer Asha Bhosle featuring composer R. D. Burman. The song was originally recorded for the 1971 Hindi film Caravan.

Widely regarded as the quintessential cabaret number in Hindi cinema, the track gained iconic status through its picturization on actress Helen. The single was composed and produced by R. D. Burman with lyrics by Majrooh Sultanpuri.

Music scholar Nilanjana Bhattacharjya cited "Piya Tu Ab To Aja" as one of the culturally significant tracks in the context of Hindi film music. The song has also been described as "the catalyst" that solidified Asha Bhosle's reputation as the leading performer of cabaret-style numbers in Bollywood.

== Music video ==
The song was performed by Helen, who is known for doing item numbers in Bollywood films of the 1960s and 1970s. It is a highly suggestive song with Asha Bhosle breathing quickly at intervals, giving it an orgasmic sound. In the film, Helen performs the provocative dance in front of a large audience, including Sunita (played by actress Asha Parekh) who has just discovered that Monica (Helen) and her husband are having an affair. The picturisation is typical of the item numbers of the era portraying a "vamp" character who dances seductively for a nightclub audience.

== Remakes ==
The song was later released as part of the video Raat Ki Rani (1987), a compilation of Helen's different cabaret numbers. Asha Bhosle recorded a new version in 2003 for the Kronos Quartet album You've Stolen My Heart: Songs from R.D. Burman's Bollywood. It also appears on the compilation album The Very Best of Asha Bhosle, The Queen of Bollywood. Composer Lesle Lewis released a remix of the song on his 2003 album Special Appointment Club Hits while R.P. Patnaik produced a Telugu version for the 2008 film Swagatam. Pritam also sampled it for his song "Parda" on the Once Upon a Time in Mumbaai soundtrack. "Piya Tu Ab to Aja" is also a frequent choice of television performers. In 2008, actress Amrita Arora danced to the song on the reality programme Chhote Ustaad. Amrita Moitra, a contestant on Zee TV's Dance India Dance, performed a mujra version of the song during the second season. The number is referenced briefly during the song "Dhoom Tanaa" from Om Shanti Om when Deepika Padukone, dressed in a gold bikini ensemble, dances in a cage. The song was also remixed by Shashwat Sachdev as "Run Down The City – Monica" in the 2025 Hindi film Dhurandhar, featuring rapper Reble.

== Awards ==
- Asha Bhosle - 1972 Filmfare Award for Best Female Playback Singer for "Piya Tu Ab To Aja"
