= Jhutha Sach =

Jhutha Sach (lit. 'False truth') may refer to:

- Jhutha Sach (novel), a two-volume novel by Indian writer Yashpal published in 1958 and 1960
- Jhutha Sach (film), a 1984 Bollywood film
