= PokerFace: Dil Sachcha Chehra Jhootha =

Indian television game show

- Created by: Miditech
- Presented by: Sharman Joshi
- Country of origin: India
- Original languages: Hindi; English
- No. of seasons: 1

Original release
- Network: Real TV
- Release: 2 March – 8 March 2009

PokerFace: Dil Sachcha Chehra Jhootha is an Indian game show based on the British format PokerFace. It debuted on 2 March 2009 on Real TV and ran for seven consecutive nights.

== Premise ==
Hosted by Sharman Joshi, the show pitted six contestants against each other in a knowledge-based quiz show where contestants were encouraged to bluff about their performances. On each nightly airing, every round had 5 questions (8 in the first round) with three possible answers, and contestants had five seconds to lock in their answers. After the correct answer is revealed, gold check marks and red crosses determined who got the answers correct.

At the end of each round, contestants were offered the opportunity to fold, at which point they could go home with current winnings. The contestants stood in front of red buttons and had 10 seconds to push the red button to exit the game and go home with their winnings. If no players took the opportunity to fold, the player with the lowest actual score was eliminated and would go home with nothing.

== Outcome ==
The contest was won by Dinesh Vohra, with Freanahita Nair in second place.
