= Xcuse Me =

2003 Indian film by N. Chandra

- Directed by: N. Chandra
- Written by: N. Chandra
- Produced by: N. Chandra
- Starring: Sahil Khan; Sharman Joshi; Sonali Joshi; Jaya Seal
- Cinematography: Manoj Gupta
- Edited by: Prashant Khedekar
- Music by: Sanjeev Darshan
- Release date: 26 September 2003
- Running time: 152 minutes
- Country: India
- Language: Hindi

Xcuse Me is a 2003 India Hindi-language comedy action drama movei directed by N. Chandra starring Sahil Khan, Sharman Joshi, Sonali Joshi and Jaya Seal. It is the sequel to the 2001 film Style. The film was released on 26 September 2003.

== Synopsis ==
Bantu and Chantu are unemployed and are not able to get any jobs due to lack of experience. They come across an advertisement for a hotel management program in Goa, and make their way there. Once there, they hoodwink the trainer by posing as the nephew of the owner of the hotel, and thus enroll themselves in the training course. In the course of the program, they expose several employees and guests as cheats, earning their wrath but also the admiration of the two daughters of the hotel owners. Things turn sour for the two when the guests and former employees get together to avenge their humiliation.

== Cast ==
- Sahil Khan as Amit (Chantu)
- Sharman Joshi as Nehal (Bantu)
- Sudhir Dalvi as Kelkar
- Sonali Joshi as Saundarya Khanna (a.k.a. Sundri)
- Mushtaq Khan as Gomes
- Monica Patel as Gomes' wife
- Jaya Seal as Monica Khurana (a.k.a. Mundri)
- Shashi Sharma as Maharani of Janakpur
- Saurabh Shukla as Mr. Gill, Institute Manager
- Snehal Dabi as Sahiba (Hotel Owner)
- Hemant Jha as Khanna
- Muni Jha as Khurana
- Darshan Zariwala as Principal Sardesai
- Dilip Rawal as Maharani of Janakpur's secretary

== Soundtrack ==
The soundtrack was composed by Sanjeev-Darshan with lyrics by Abbas Katka.

#	Title	Singer(s)
1	"Boom Boom"	Sanjeev Darshan
2	"Excuse Me"	Hema Sardesai
3	"Ishq Hua"	Shaan, Shreya Ghoshal
4	"Ishq Hua (II)"	Udit Narayan, Shreya Ghoshal
5	"Ladki Ladki"	Abhijeet, Shaan
6	"Yeh Tu Kya Kar Rahela Hai"	Abhijeet, Sunidhi Chauhan

== Reception ==
Vidya Srinivasa Rao of Rediff.com wrote, "Overall, though, the movie is a fun experience. If you are not laughing at the leading men's jokes and antics, you are laughing at their stupidity. Whichever way, your jawbones are always working. Watching XCuse Me would not be a bad idea this weekend." Taran Adarsh of IndiaFM gave the film 1.5 out of 5, writing, "On the whole, XCUSE ME is a fair entertainer that should appeal to the youth mainly."
