= Vice Raid =

1959 film by Edward L. Cahn

- Directed by: Edward L. Cahn
- Written by: Charles Ellis
- Produced by: Robert E. Kent; Edward Small (uncredited)
- Starring: Mamie Van Doren; Richard Coogan
- Cinematography: Stanley Cortez
- Edited by: Grant Whytock
- Music by: Robert Carlisle
- Production company: Imperial
- Distributed by: United Artists
- Release date: December 1959
- Running time: 71 minutes
- Country: United States
- Language: English

Vice Raid is a 1959 B-movie crime drama directed by Edward L. Cahn and starring Mamie Van Doren and Richard Coogan. It was issued on a double bill with Inside the Mafia.

== Plot ==
Police Sgt. Whitey Brandon works for the Vice Squad and is determined to beat corruption in the city. He encounters Carol Hudson who is working as a model. She is sent to frame him and succeeds. Carol's sister comes to visit and is raped and bashed by a thug who knows Carol. Carol, desperate for revenge, enlists the help of Brandon to fight the thugs who attacked her sister.

== Cast ==
- Mamie Van Doren as Carol Hudson
- Richard Coogan as Police Sergeant Whitey Brandon
- Brad Dexter as Vince Malone
- Barry Atwater as Phil Evans
- Carol Nugent as Louise Hudson
- Frank Gerstle as Captain William Brennan
- Joseph Sullivan as Police Sergeant Ben Dunton
- Chris Alcaide as Eddie

== Production ==
Van Doren signed a three-picture deal with producer Edward Small but Vice Raid was the only film she made for him.
