= Sahil Khan =

Indian actor and youtuber (born 1976)

- Born: 5 November 1976 (age 49); Kolkata, West Bengal, India
- Occupations: Entrepreneur; Actor
- Years active: 2001–2010
- Spouses: Negar Khan (m. 2004; div. 2005); Milena Alexandra (m. 2024)
- Website: isahilkhan.com

Sahil Khan (born 5 November 1976) is an Indian actor, fitness entrepreneur, and YouTuber, known for his role in Hindi-language films Style and Xcuse Me.

In April 2024, he was arrested by the Mumbai cyber cell's Special Investigation Team in connection with the ₹15,000 crore (US$1.6 million) Mahadev Betting App Case.

== Early life ==
Khan was born in Kolkata, West Bengal to an Indian Muslim father and a Chinese Christian mother, growing up in relative poverty before running away from home at the age of 15 to Mumbai, in order to fulfill his dream of becoming a professional bodybuilder.

== Career ==
Khan started his career with a musical video of Stereo Nation Nachange Sari Raat. N. Chandra signed him to play the lead role in his film Style. The film went on to become a box office success. Immediately thereafter, the sequel to Style, Xcuse Me, also went on in the comedy genre. He also starred in Aladin and Ramaa: The Saviour. He is also associated with the water brand Hunk Water.

== Filmography ==
| Year | Film | Language | Notes |
|---|---|---|---|
| 2001 | Style | Hindi | |
| 2003 | Xcuse Me | Hindi | |
| 2005 | Yehi Hai Zindagi | Hindi | |
| 2005 | Double Cross | Hindi | |
| 2009 | Aladin | Hindi | |
| 2010 | Ramaa: The Saviour | Hindi | |

== Personal life ==
Khan married Negar Khan on 21 September 2004. They divorced in July 2005.
In 2024, he married his girlfriend Milena Alexandra. She is from Belarus. In January 2024, Sahil announced that Milena has embraced Islam.

== Controversies ==
Khan is said to have had an affair with Ayesha Shroff in 2009, during their joint venture in a production company. The alleged relationship between the two and their business partnership took an ugly shape later in 2014 when she filed a legal case against him. In return, the actor's lawyer submitted some intimate photos to the court, which showed both Khan and Shroff in a compromising situation, implying there was much more than just professional commitment between the two.

In 2014, Khan was involved in a gym fight with Bollywood actor Sana Khan's alleged boyfriend Ismail Khan. Reportedly, Ismail attacked Sahil unexpectedly in a Mumbai-based gym over a business contract delay causing this feud. Also apparently starting rumours by Sahil about Sana Khan and Ismail's relationship but this is denied by Sahil.

In 2023, the crime branch, during an investigation into the Mahadev betting app case summoned Sahil and three others to provide statements on 15 December. However, he did not appear for the questioning by the police and later asserted that he functioned solely as a brand promoter under contract with Isports247, endorsing The Lion Book brand, and denied any direct connection to the betting platform. However, the police claimed he was a co-owner of the app and he was also involved as a partner in Lotus App 247. According to the First Information Report registered by the Matunga police, the alleged scam was estimated at approximately ₹15,000 crore. On 13 April, he was once again summoned by the Mumbai Police and was interrogated by the SIT in connection with the case.

Following the rejection of his interim bail plea by the Bombay High Court, he left Mumbai and tried to leave India altogether to live a better life in another country. However, on 28 April 2024, he was arrested from Chhattisgarh by the Mumbai cyber cell's Special Investigation Team after a 40-hour, 1800-kilometer chase across 5 states, with assistance from the Chhattisgarh Police for his involvement in the Mahadev Betting App Case. On 5 July, 2024 he got bail.
