= Karunesh =

German-born new-age and ambient musician

Karunesh (born Bruno Reuter) is a New Age, Ambient and World Fusion musician.

== Discography ==
=== Solo albums ===
Year	Album name	Notes
1985	Sounds of the Heart	
1987	Colours of Light	
1989	Sky's Beyond	
1990	Heart Symphony	
1990	Heart Chakra Meditation	
1993	Beyond Body & Mind	
1995	Secrets of Life	
1997	Osho Chakra Sounds Meditation	Osho Active Meditations series
2000	Global Spirit	
2001	Zen Breakfast	
2001	Silent Heart	
2002	Nirvana Cafe	
2002	The Way of the Heart	
2003	Beyond Heaven	
2004	Call Of the Mystic	
2006	Global Village	
2006	Joy of Life	
2008	Enlightenment: A Sacred Collection	Compilation
2009	Heart Chakra Meditation II: Coming Home	
2010	Path of Compassion	Compilation & two new songs
2010	Beyond Time	Compilation
2010	Enchantment	Compilation
2012	Baby Massage	Professional Music series
2012	Colors of the East	
2016	Sun Within	

=== Compilations released by Plusquam New Age ===
Year	Album name
2014	Yoga Love
2015	A Beautiful Day
2015	Bombay Pure
2015	Rays of Hope
2015	Fantasy Dancer
2015	A Journey to India
2015	The Circle
2015	Tranceformation

== See also ==
- List of ambient music artists
