= List of accolades received by Chak De! India =

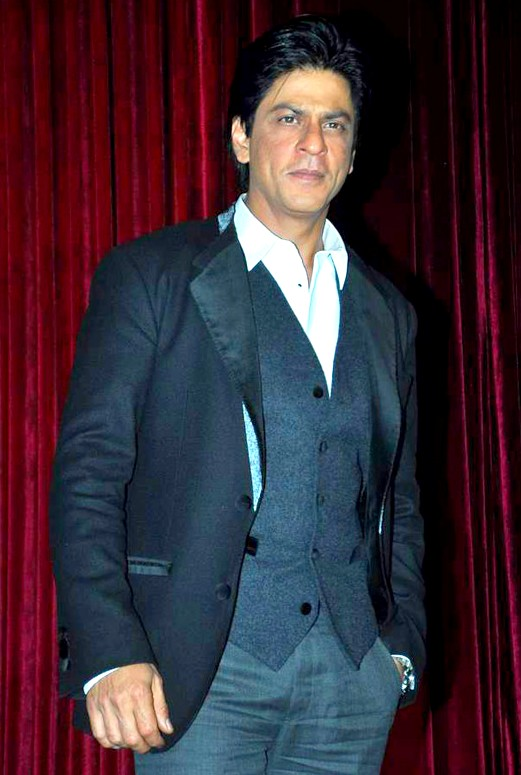
- Shah Rukh Khan's performance in the film garnered him several awards and nominations.
Accolades
Award	Won	Nominated
Billie Awards	1	1
Filmfare Awards	5	12
International Indian Film Academy Awards	9	14
National Film Awards	1	1
Producers Guild Film Awards	8	14
Screen Awards	6	12
Stardust Awards	3	7
V. Shantaram Awards	5	5
Zee Cine Awards	5	6
- Total number of awards and nominations (Note: Awards in certain categories do not have prior nominations and only winners are announced by the jury. For simplification and to avoid errors, each award in this list has been presumed to have had a prior nomination.)
Totals	43	72
- References

Chak De! India (transl. "Go for it! India!") or (transl. "Let's go! India") is a 2007 Hindi cinema sports film about field hockey in India, directed by Shimit Amin and produced by Aditya Chopra under the banner of Yash Raj Films. The film stars Shah Rukh Khan as Kabir Khan, former captain of the India men's national field hockey team. After a disastrous loss to Pakistan, Khan is ostracized from the sport owing to religious prejudice. 7 years later in an attempt to redeem himself, he becomes the coach of the Indian national women's hockey team, with the goal of turning its 16 contentious players into an award-winning team.

Produced on a budget of ₹200 million, Chak De! India was released on 10 August 2007 to positive reviews. It was commercially successful, grossing over ₹1.01 billion worldwide. Its direction, story, and performances of the cast members have received the most attention from award groups. The film won 43 awards from 72 nominations.

Chak De! India won Best Popular Film Providing Wholesome Entertainment at the 55th National Film Awards ceremony. At the 53rd Filmfare Awards, it received twelve nominations and won five, including those for Critics Best Film, Best Actor, Best Action, Best Cinematography and Best Editing. Among other wins, the film got fourteen nominations and won nine awards at 9th IIFA Awards, at the Producers Guild Film Awards, it received fourteen nominations and won eight awards, at the Screen Awards, it received twelve nominations and won six awards at the Stardust Awards, it received seven nominations and won three awards, at the V. Shantaram Awards, it won five awards and at Zee Cine Awards, it received seven nominations and won six awards.

On 30 August 2007, the Academy of Motion Picture Arts and Sciences requested a copy of the film's script for a place in its Margaret Herrick Library. When the Indian Hockey Federation was reorganised in April 2008, former player Aslam Sher Khan said that he wanted "to create a 'Chak De' effect" in Indian hockey. The film was screened in New Delhi on 17 August 2016, as part of the week long Independence Day Film Festival. The festival was jointly presented by the Indian Directorate of Film Festivals and Ministry of Defense, commemorating India's 70th Independence Day.

== Awards and nominations ==
Award	Date of ceremony (Note: Date is linked to the article about the awards held that year, wherever possible.)	Category	Recipient(s)	Result	Ref.
Billie Awards	15 April 2008	Entertainment Award	Shimit Amin , Rob Miller	Won	
Filmfare Awards	16 February 2008	Best Film	Chak De! India	Nominated	
Filmfare Awards	16 February 2008	Best Film (Critics)	Chak De! India	Won	
Filmfare Awards	16 February 2008	Best Director	Shimit Amin	Nominated	
Filmfare Awards	16 February 2008	Best Story	Jaideep Sahni	Nominated	
Filmfare Awards	16 February 2008	Best Screenplay	Jaideep Sahni	Nominated	
Filmfare Awards	16 February 2008	Best Dialogue	Jaideep Sahni	Nominated	
Filmfare Awards	16 February 2008	Best Costume Design	Mandira Shukla	Nominated	
Filmfare Awards	16 February 2008	Best Actor	Shah Rukh Khan	Won	
Filmfare Awards	16 February 2008	Best Supporting Actress	Shilpa Shukla	Nominated	
Filmfare Awards	16 February 2008	Best Male Playback Singer	Sukhwinder Singh ("Chak De! India")	Nominated	
Filmfare Awards	16 February 2008	Best Action	Rob Miller	Won	
Filmfare Awards	16 February 2008	Best Cinematographer	Sudeep Chatterjee	Won	
Filmfare Awards	16 February 2008	Best Editing	Amitabh Shukla	Won	
International Indian Film Academy Awards	6 – 8 June 2008	Best Film	Chak De! India	Won	
International Indian Film Academy Awards	6 – 8 June 2008	Best Director	Shimit Amin	Won	
International Indian Film Academy Awards	6 – 8 June 2008	Best Screenplay (Note: Shared with Anurag Basu for Life in a... Metro.)	Jaideep Sahni	Won	
International Indian Film Academy Awards	6 – 8 June 2008	Best Story	Jaideep Sahni	Won	
International Indian Film Academy Awards	6 – 8 June 2008	Best Actor	Shah Rukh Khan	Won	
International Indian Film Academy Awards	6 – 8 June 2008	Best Supporting Actress	Chitrashi Rawat	Nominated	
International Indian Film Academy Awards	6 – 8 June 2008	Best Performance in a Negative Role	Shilpa Shukla	Nominated	
International Indian Film Academy Awards	6 – 8 June 2008	Best Music Director	Salim–Sulaiman	Nominated	
International Indian Film Academy Awards	6 – 8 June 2008	Best Costume Design	Mandira Shukla	Nominated	
International Indian Film Academy Awards	6 – 8 June 2008	Best Lyricist	Jaideep Sahni ("Chak De! India")	Nominated	
International Indian Film Academy Awards	6 – 8 June 2008	Best Male Playback Singer	Sukhwinder Singh ("Chak De! India")	Nominated	
International Indian Film Academy Awards	6 – 8 June 2008	Best Cinematography	Sudeep Chatterjee	Won	
International Indian Film Academy Awards	6 – 8 June 2008	Best Editing	Amitabh Shukla	Won	
International Indian Film Academy Awards	6 – 8 June 2008	Best Sound Recording	Manas Choudhary, Ali Merchant	Won	
International Indian Film Academy Awards	6 – 8 June 2008	Best Sound Re-Recording	Anuj Mathur, Ali Merchant	Won	
National Film Awards	21 October 2009	Best Popular Film Providing Wholesome Entertainment	Aditya Chopra, Shimit Amin	Won	
Producers Guild Film Awards (Note: Previously known as Apsara Film & Television Producers Guild Awards.)	30 March 2008	Best Film	Aditya Chopra	Won	
Producers Guild Film Awards	30 March 2008	Best Director	Shimit Amin	Won	
Producers Guild Film Awards	30 March 2008	Best Screenplay	Jaideep Sahni	Won	
Producers Guild Film Awards	30 March 2008	Best Story	Jaideep Sahni	Won	
Producers Guild Film Awards	30 March 2008	Best Dialogues	Jaideep Sahni	Nominated	
Producers Guild Film Awards	30 March 2008	Best Actor in a Leading Role	Shah Rukh Khan	Won	
Producers Guild Film Awards	30 March 2008	Best Actress in a Supporting Role	Chak De Girls	Nominated	
Producers Guild Film Awards	30 March 2008	Best Actor in a Negative Role	Shilpa Shukla	Nominated	
Producers Guild Film Awards	30 March 2008	Best Male Playback Singer	Sukhwinder Singh ("Chak De! India")	Nominated	
Producers Guild Film Awards	30 March 2008	Best Editor	Amitabh Shukla	Won	
Producers Guild Film Awards	30 March 2008	Best Sound	Manas Choudhary, Ali Merchant	Won	
Producers Guild Film Awards	30 March 2008	Best Re-Recording	Anuj Mathur	Won	
Producers Guild Film Awards	30 March 2008	Best Sound Recording	Manas Choudhary, Ali Merchant	Nominated	
Producers Guild Film Awards	30 March 2008	Best Special Effects	Red Chillies VFX	Nominated	
Screen Awards	10 January 2008	Best Film	Aditya Chopra	Won	
Screen Awards	10 January 2008	Best Director	Shimit Amin (Note: Shared with Aamir Khan for Taare Zameen Par.)	Won	
Screen Awards	10 January 2008	Best Story	Jaideep Sahni	Nominated	
Screen Awards	10 January 2008	Best Screenplay	Jaideep Sahni	Nominated	
Screen Awards	10 January 2008	Best Dialogue	Jaideep Sahni	Nominated	
Screen Awards	10 January 2008	Best Cinematography	Sudeep Chatterjee	Won	
Screen Awards	10 January 2008	Best Actor	Shah Rukh Khan	Won	
Screen Awards	10 January 2008	Best Supporting Actress	Chak De Girls	Won	
Screen Awards	10 January 2008	Best Editing	Amitabh Shukla	Won	
Screen Awards	10 January 2008	Best Background Music	Salim–Sulaiman	Nominated	
Screen Awards	10 January 2008	Best Sound	Manas Choudhary, Ali Merchant	Nominated	
Screen Awards	10 January 2008	Best Special Effects	Red Chillies VFX	Nominated	
Stardust Awards	25 January 2008	Best Film of the Year	Chak De! India	Nominated	
Stardust Awards	25 January 2008	Hottest Young Film Maker	Shimit Amin	Won	
Stardust Awards	25 January 2008	Star of the Year – Male	Shah Rukh Khan	Nominated	
Stardust Awards	25 January 2008	Superstar of Tomorrow – Female	Sagarika Ghatge	Nominated	
Stardust Awards	25 January 2008	Breakthrough Performance – Female	Chitrashi Rawat	Nominated	
Stardust Awards	25 January 2008	The New Menace	Shilpa Shukla	Won	
Stardust Awards	25 January 2008	New Musical Sensation (Male)	Krishna and Salim Merchant for "Maula Mere Le Le Meri Jaan"	Won	
V. Shantaram Awards	19 November 2007	Best Film	Aditya Chopra	Won	
V. Shantaram Awards	19 November 2007	Best Director	Shimit Amin	Won	
V. Shantaram Awards	19 November 2007	Best Actor	Shah Rukh Khan	Won	
V. Shantaram Awards	19 November 2007	Best Editor	Amitabh Shukla	Won	
V. Shantaram Awards	19 November 2007	Best Sound	Manas Choudhary, Ali Merchant	Won	
Zee Cine Awards	26 April 2008	Best Film	Aditya Chopra	Won	
Zee Cine Awards	26 April 2008	Best Actor – Male	Shah Rukh Khan	Won	
Zee Cine Awards	26 April 2008	Best Performance in a Negative Role	Shilpa Shukla	Nominated	
Zee Cine Awards	26 April 2008	Best Dialogue	Jaideep Sahni	Won	
Zee Cine Awards	26 April 2008	Best Cinematography	Sudeep Chatterjee	Won	
Zee Cine Awards	26 April 2008	Best Editing	Amitabh Shukla	Won	

== See also ==
- List of Bollywood films of 2007

== Notes ==
Awards
Preceded by Lage Raho Munna Bhai	Filmfare Critics Award for Best Movie; 2008	Succeeded by Mumbai Meri Jaan
