= 14th Screen Awards =

Awards for Hindi-language films of 2008

- Date: 10 January 2008
- Site: Bandra Kurla Complex Ground, Mumbai
- Hosted by: Sajid Khan

Highlights
- Best Picture: Chak De! India
- Best Direction: Shimit Amin and Aamir Khan (Chak De! India and Taare Zameen Par)
- Best Actor: Shah Rukh Khan (Chak De! India)
- Best Actress: Kareena Kapoor (Jab We Met)
- Most awards: Taare Zameen Par (7)
- Most nominations: Taare Zameen Par (16)

Television coverage
- Channel: StarPlus
- Network: Disney Star

The 14th Screen Awards also The Nokia 14th Annual Screen Awards ceremony, presented by Indian Express Group, honored the best Indian Hindi-language films of 2007. The ceremony was held on 10 January 2008 at Bandra Kurla Complex Ground, Mumbai. Hosted by Sajid Khan, it was telecasted on 27 January 2008 on StarPlus.

Taare Zameen Par led the ceremony with 16 nominations, followed by Guru and Life in a... Metro with 14 nominations each and Chak De! India with 12 nominations.

Taare Zameen Par won 7 awards, including Best Director and Best Supporting Actor (both for Aamir Khan), thus becoming the most-awarded film at the ceremony.

== Awards ==
The winners and nominees have been listed below. Winners are listed first, highlighted in boldface, and indicated with a double dagger (‡).

=== Main awards ===
Best Film	Best Director
**Chak De! India**‡; Guru; Life in a... Metro; Om Shanti Om; Taare Zameen Par	**Aamir Khan – Taare Zameen Par**‡; **Shimit Amin – Chak De! India**‡; Anurag Basu – Life in a... Metro; Farah Khan – Om Shanti Om; Mani Ratnam – Guru
Best Actor	Best Actress
**Shah Rukh Khan – Chak De! India as Hockey Coach Kabir Khan**‡; Abhishek Bachchan – Guru as Gurukant "Guru" Desai; Akshaye Khanna – Gandhi, My Father as Harilal Gandhi; Amitabh Bachchan – Cheeni Kum as Buddhadeb Gupta; Shahid Kapoor – Jab We Met as Aditya Kashyap	**Kareena Kapoor – Jab We Met as Geet Dhillon**‡; Aishwarya Rai Bachchan – Guru as Sujata "Suju" Desai; Tabu – Cheeni Kum as Nina Verma
Best Supporting Actor	Best Supporting Actress
**Aamir Khan – Taare Zameen Par as Ram Shankar Nikumbh**‡; Darshan Jariwala – Gandhi, My Father as Mahatma Gandhi; Mithun Chakraborty – Guru as Manikdas Dasgupta; Sharman Joshi – Life in a... Metro as Rahul; Vipin Sharma – Taare Zameen Par as Nandkishore "Nandu" Awasthi	**Chak De! Girls – Chak De! India as Various**‡; Konkona Sen Sharma – Life in a... Metro as Shruti Ghosh; Shefali Shah – Gandhi, My Father as Kasturba Gandhi; Tisca Chopra – Taare Zameen Par as Maya Awasthi
Best Actor in a Negative Role – Male / Female	Best Actor in a Comic Role – Male / Female
**Pankaj Kapur** – **The Blue Umbrella as Nandkishore "Nandu" Khatri**‡; Arjun Rampal – Om Shanti Om as Mukesh "Mike" Mehra; Pavan Malhotra – Black Friday as Tiger Memon; Vivek Oberoi – Shootout at Lokhandwala as Mahindra "Maya" Dolas	**Irrfan Khan** – **Life in a... Metro as Monty**‡; Anil Kapoor – Welcome as Sagar "Majnu" Pandey; Govinda – Partner as Bhaskar Devakar Chaudhary; Nana Patekar – Welcome as Uday Shankar Shetty; Vinay Pathak – Bheja Fry as Ranjeet Thadani
Best Child Artist	Most Promising Debut Director
**Darsheel Safary** – **Taare Zameen Par as Ishaan Nandkishore Awasthi**‡; Ali Haji – Ta Ra Rum Pum as Ranvir "Champ" Singh; Angelina Idnani – Ta Ra Rum Pum as Priya "Princess" Singh; Dhruv Piyush Panjuani – Apna Asmaan as Buddhi Kumar and Aryabhatta; Shreya Sharma – The Blue Umbrella as Biniya	**Aamir Khan – Taare Zameen Par**‡; Feroz Abbas Khan – Gandhi, My Father; R. Balki – Cheeni Kum; Reema Kagti – Honeymoon Travels Pvt. Ltd.; Sajid Khan – Heyy Babyy
Most Promising Newcomer – Male	Most Promising Newcomer – Female
**Ranbir Kapoor – Saawariya as Raj**‡; Neil Nitin Mukesh – Johnny Gaddaar as Johnny	**Deepika Padukone – Om Shanti Om as Shantipriya/Sandhya "Sandy" Bansal**‡; Sonam Kapoor – Saawariya as Sakina
Best Music Director	Best Lyricist
**A. R. Rahman – Guru**‡; Monty Sharma – Saawariya; Pritam – Life in a... Metro; Shankar–Ehsaan–Loy – Jhoom Barabar Jhoom; Shankar–Ehsaan–Loy – Taare Zameen Par	**Prasoon Joshi – "Maa" – Taare Zameen Par**‡; Gulzar – "Bol Na Halke Halke" – Jhoom Barabar Jhoom; Sameer Anjaan – "Jab Se Tere Naina" – Saawariya; Sayeed Quadri – "In Dino" – Life in a... Metro
Best Male Playback Singer	Best Female Playback Singer
**Soham Chakrabarty – "In Dino" – Life in a... Metro**‡; KK – "Aankhon Mein Teri" – Om Shanti Om; Shaan – "Jab Se Tere Naina" – Saawariya; Shankar Mahadevan – "Maa" – Taare Zameen Par; Shankar Mahadevan – "Taare Zameen Par" – Taare Zameen Par	**Shreya Ghoshal – "Barso Re" – Guru**‡; Chinmayi – "Tere Bina" – Guru; Shreya Ghoshal – "Yeh Ishq Haye" – Jab We Met; Sunidhi Chauhan – "Sajnaji Vaari" – Honeymoon Travels Pvt. Ltd.

=== Technical Awards ===
Best Story	Best Screenplay
**Amole Gupte** – **Taare Zameen Par**‡; Anurag Basu – Life in a... Metro; Feroz Abbas Khan – Gandhi, My Father; Imtiaz Ali – Jab We Met; Jaideep Sahni – Chak De! India	**Anurag Basu** – **Life in a... Metro**‡; Amole Gupte – Taare Zameen Par; Anurag Kashyap – Black Friday; Imtiaz Ali – Jab We Met; Jaideep Sahni – Chak De! India
Best Dialogue	Best Background Music
**Amole Gupte** – **Taare Zameen Par**‡; Imtiaz Ali – Jab We Met; Jaideep Sahni – Chak De! India; Sanjiv Dutta – Life in a... Metro; Vijay Krishna Acharya – Guru	**A. R. Rahman – Guru**‡; Raju Singh – Life in a... Metro; Salim–Sulaiman – Chak De! India; Sandeep Chowta – Om Shanti Om; Shankar–Ehsaan–Loy – Taare Zameen Par
Best Editing	Best Cinematography
**Amitabh Shukla** – **Chak De! India**‡; Aarti Bajaj – Black Friday; Akiv Ali – Life in a... Metro; Bunty Nagi – Shootout at Lokhandwala; Pooja Ladha Surti – Johnny Gaddaar	**Sudeep Chatterjee** – **Chak De! India**‡; Bobby Singh – Life in a... Metro; Natty Subramaniam – Eklavya: The Royal Guard; Rajiv Menon – Guru; Ravi K. Chandran – Saawariya
Best Art Direction	Best Sound Design
**Nitin Chandrakant Desai** – **Gandhi, My Father**‡; Gautam Sen – Khoya Khoya Chand; Omung Kumar – Saawariya; Sabu Cyril – Guru; Sabu Cyril – Om Shanti Om	**Bishwadeep Chatterjee** – **Eklavya: The Royal Guard**‡; Baylon Fonseca – Shootout at Lokhandwala; H. Sridhar – Guru; Hari Dwarak & Madhu Apsara – Johnny Gaddaar; Manas Choudhury & Ali Merchant – Chak De! India
Best Choreography	Best Action
**Farah Khan** – **"Dhoom Taana"** – **Om Shanti Om**‡; Ganesh Hegde & Pappu Mallu – "Yun Shabnami" – Saawariya; Saroj Khan – "Barso Re" – Guru; Vaibhavi Merchant – "Aaja Nachle" – Aaja Nachle; Vaibhavi Merchant – "Jhoom Barabar Jhoom" – Jhoom Barabar Jhoom	**Tinu Verma** – **Apne**‡; Abbas Ali Moghul – Awarapan; Anthony Stone – Cash; Javed Ejaz – Shootout at Lokhandwala
Best Special Effects (Visual)
**Red Chillies VFX** – **Om Shanti Om**‡; Red Chillies VFX – Chak De! India; Tata Elxsi – Taare Zameen Par

=== Critics' awards ===
Critics Best Actor – Male	Critics Best Actor – Female
**Amitabh Bachchan – Cheeni Kum as Buddhadev Gupta**‡	**Tabu – Cheeni Kum as Nina Verma**‡

=== Special awards ===
Lifetime Achievement Award
- **Manoj Kumar**
That May Be Debut 4 years later
- **Ayushmann Khurrana**
Jodi No. 1
- **Shah Rukh Khan** & **Deepika Padukone** (Om Shanti Om)

== Superlatives ==
Multiple nominations
Nominations	Film
16	Taare Zameen Par
14	Guru
14	Life in a... Metro
12	Chak De! India
10	Om Shanti Om
8	Saawariya
6	Gandhi, My Father
6	Jab We Met
5	Cheeni Kum
4	Shootout at Lokhandwala
3	Black Friday
3	Jhoom Barabar Jhoom
3	Johnny Gaddaar
2	Eklavya: The Royal Guard
2	Honeymoon Travels Pvt. Ltd.
2	Ta Ra Rum Pum
2	The Blue Umbrella
2	Welcome

Multiple wins
Awards	Film
7	Taare Zameen Par
6	Chak De! India
4	Om Shanti Om
3	Guru
3	Life in a... Metro
2	Cheeni Kum
