= 9th IIFA Awards =

Indian film award ceremony in 2008

- The official logo of the 2008 IIFA Awards
- Date: 6 June 2008– 8 June 2008
- Site: Siam Paragon; Bangkok, Thailand
- Hosted by: Boman Irani; Ritesh Deshmukh; Urmila Matondkar

Highlights
- Best Picture: Chak De! India
- Best Direction: Shimit Amin (Chak De! India)
- Best Actor: Shahrukh Khan (Chak De! India)
- Best Actress: Kareena Kapoor (Jab We Met)
- Most awards: Chak De! India (9)
- Most nominations: Chak De! India (14)

Television coverage
- Channel: Star Plus
- Network: STAR TV

The 2008 IIFA Awards, officially known as the 9th International Indian Film Academy Awards ceremony, presented by the International Indian Film Academy honoured the best films of 2007 and took place between 6 – 8 June 2008. The official ceremony took place on 8 June 2008, at the Siam Paragon in Bangkok, Thailand. During the ceremony, IIFA Awards were awarded in 27 competitive categories. The ceremony was televised in India and internationally on Star Plus. Actors Boman Irani and Ritesh Deshmukh co-hosted the ceremony for the first time.

The IIFA Music and Fashion Extravaganza took place on 7 June 2008, as did the FICCI-IIFA Global Business Forum. On 6 June, The IIFA World Premiere was held at Major Cineplex, Bangkok which showcased Sarkar Raj, starring Indian Film icons Amitabh Bachchan, Abhishek Bachchan and Aishwarya Rai Bachchan, directed by Ram Gopal Varma.

Partner led the ceremony with 11 nominations, followed by Guru with 10 nominations, Bhool Bhulaiyaa and Chak De! India with 9 nominations each, Life in a... Metro with 8 nominations and Jab We Met with 6 nominations.

Chak De! India won 9 awards, including Best Film, Best Director (for Shimit Amin), Best Actor (for Shah Rukh Khan), thus becoming the most-awarded film at the ceremony.

Om Shanti Om won 6 awards. Other multiple winners included Life in a... Metro with 3 awards and Guru, Jab We Met, Saawariya and Shootout at Lokhandwala with 2 awards each. In addition, Partner received 1 award at the ceremony.

Konkona Sen Sharma received dual nominations for Best Supporting Actress for her performances in Laaga Chunari Mein Daag and Life in a... Metro, winning for the latter.

== Winners and nominees ==
Winners are listed first and highlighted in boldface.

=== Popular awards ===
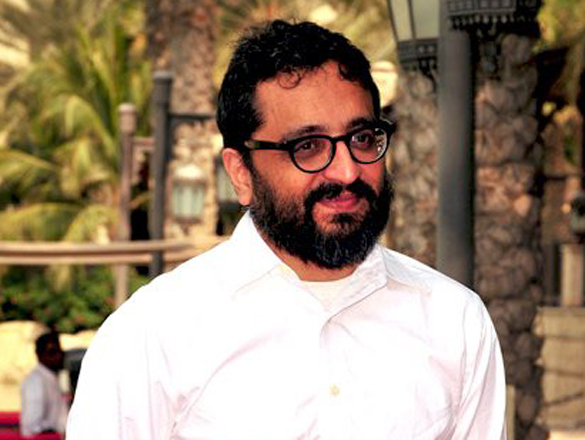
Shimit Amin (Best Director)

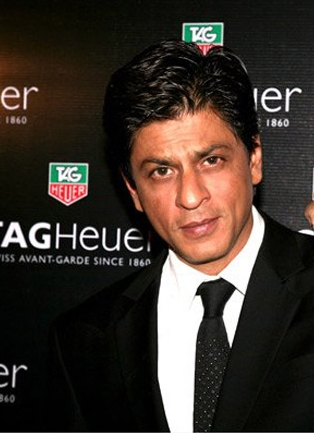
Shah Rukh Khan (Best Actor)

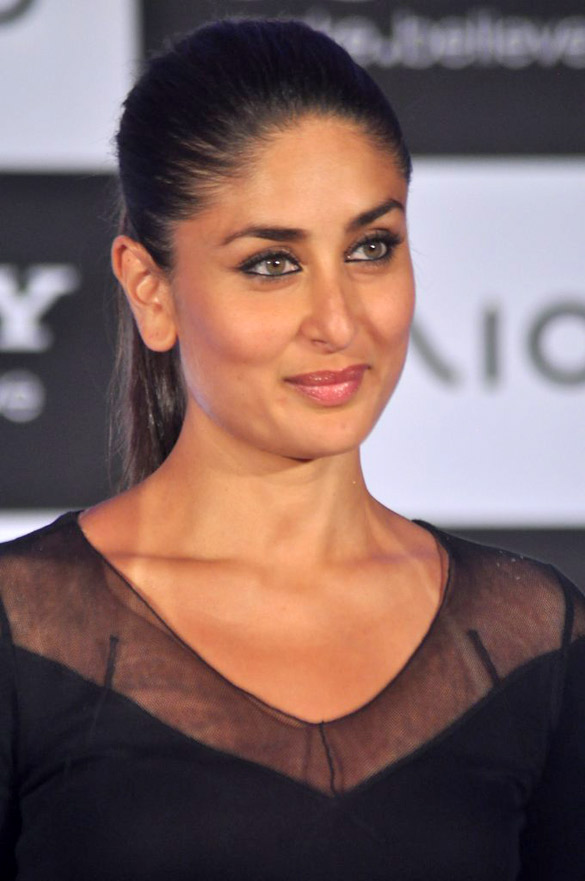
Kareena Kapoor (Best Actress)

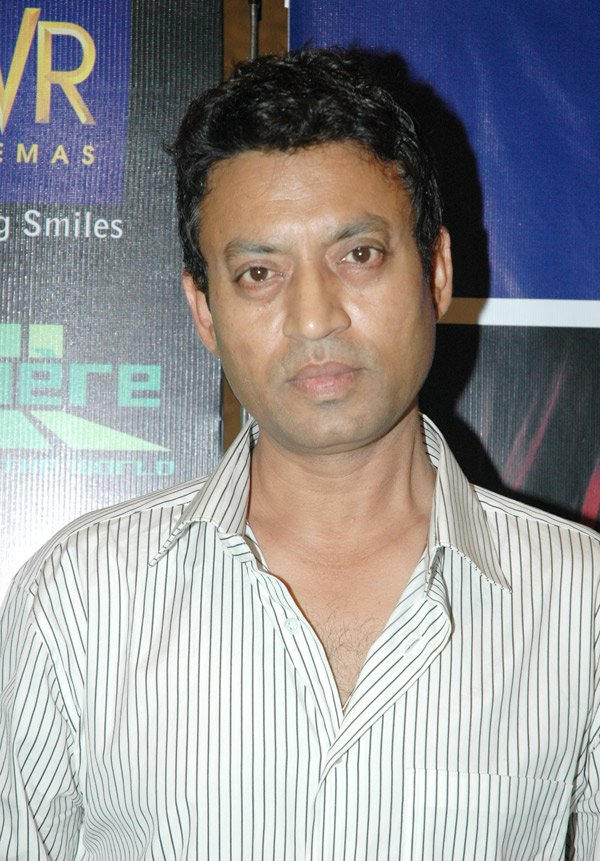
Irrfan Khan (Best Supporting Actor)

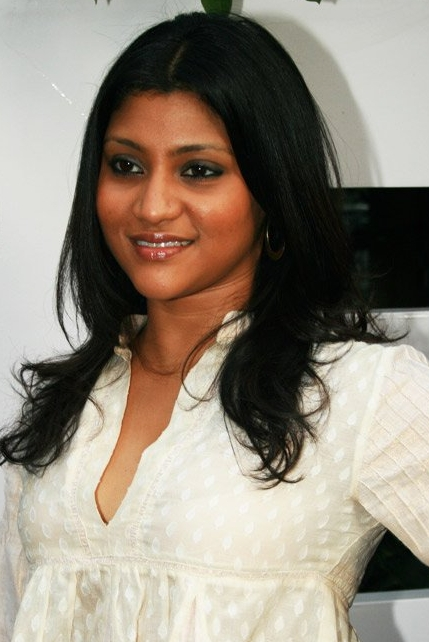
Konkona Sen Sharma (Best Supporting Actress)

Best Picture	Best Director
**Chak De! India – Yash Raj Films**; Guru – Madras Talkies and Mani Ratnam; Jab We Met – Shree Ashtavinayak Cine Vision Ltd; Life in a... Metro – UTV Motion Pictures; Om Shanti Om – Red Chillies Entertainment; Partner – K Sera Sera	**Shimit Amin – Chak De! India**; Anurag Basu – Life in a... Metro; David Dhawan – Partner; Imtiaz Ali – Jab We Met; Mani Ratnam – Guru; Priyadarshan – Bhool Bhulaiyaa
Best Performance In A Leading Role Male	Best Performance In A Leading Role Female
**Shah Rukh Khan – Chak De! India as Kabir Khan**; Abhishek Bachchan – Guru as Gurukant "Guru" Desai; Akshay Kumar – Bhool Bhulaiyaa as Dr. Aditya Shrivastav; Salman Khan – Partner as Prem (Love Guru); Shahid Kapoor – Jab We Met as Aditya Kashyap	**Kareena Kapoor – Jab We Met as Geet Dhillon**; Aishwarya Rai – Guru as Sujata Desai; Deepika Padukone – Om Shanti Om as Shanti Priya / Sandy; Katrina Kaif – Namastey London as Jasmeet 'Jazz' Malhotra; Lara Dutta – Partner as Naina Sahni; Tabu – Cheeni Kum as Nina Verma; Vidya Balan – Bhool Bhulaiyaa as Avni Siddharth Chaturvedi / Manmother
Best Performance In A Supporting Role Male	Best Performance In A Supporting Role Female
**Irrfan Khan – Life in a... Metro as Monty**; Anil Kapoor – Welcome as Sagar Pandey (Majnu); Govinda – Partner as Bhaskar Devakar Chaudhary; Mithun Chakraborty – Guru as Manik Dasgupta; Rajat Kapoor – Bheja Fry as Ranjeet Thadani	**Konkona Sen Sharma – Life in a... Metro as Shruti**; Chitrashi Rawat – Chak De! India as Komal Chautala; Katrina Kaif – Partner as Priya Jaisingh; Konkona Sen Sharma – Laaga Chunari Mein Daag as Shubhavari Sahay / Chutki; Rani Mukerji – Saawariya as Gulabji; Vidya Balan – Guru as Meenakshi "Meenu" Saxena; Zohra Sehgal – Cheeni Kum as Buddhadev's mother
Best Performance In A Comic Role	Best Performance In A Negative Role
**Govinda – Partner as Bhaskar Devakar Chaudhary**; Fardeen Khan – Heyy Babyy as Ali 'Al' Haider; Irrfan Khan – Life in a... Metro as Monty; Paresh Rawal – Bhool Bhulaiyaa as Batukshankar Upadhyay; Rajpal Yadav – Bhool Bhulaiyaa & Partner as Chhote Pandit / Lal Hanuman (Natwar) and Chota Don; Riteish Deshmukh – Heyy Babyy as Tanmay Joglekar; Vinay Pathak – Bheja Fry as Bharat Bhushan	**Vivek Oberoi – Shootout at Lokhandwala as Mahindra "Maya" Dolas**; Arjun Rampal – Om Shanti Om as Mukesh Mehra "Mike"; Kay Kay Menon – Life in a... Metro as Ranjeet; Rajat Bedi – Partner as Neil Bakshi; Shilpa Shukla – Chak De! India as Bindiya Naik; Tusshar Kapoor – Shootout at Lokhandwala as Dilip "Buwa" Kohok; Vidya Balan – Bhool Bhulaiyaa as Avni Siddharth Chaturvedi / Manjulika
Male Debutant Star	Female Debutant Star
**Ranbir Kapoor – Saawariya as Ranbir Raj**	**Deepika Padukone – Om Shanti Om as Shanti Priya / Sandy**

=== Musical awards ===
Best Music Director	Best Lyrics
**A. R. Rahman – Guru**; Mika Singh – Shootout at Lokhandwala; Monty Sharma – Saawariya; Pritam – Bhool Bhulaiyaa; Sajid–Wajid – Partner; Salim–Sulaiman – Chak De! India	**"Main Agar Kahoon" from Om Shanti Om – Javed Akhtar**; "Tere Bina" from Guru – Gulzar; "Chak De! India" from Chak De! India – Jaideep Sahni; "In Dino" from Life in a... Metro – Sayeed Quadri; "Jab Se Tere Naina" from Saawariya – Sameer
Best Male Playback Singer	Best Female Playback Singer
**Shaan for "Jab Se Tere Naina" – Saawariya**; Neeraj Shridhar for "Hare Ram Hare Ram" – Bhool Bhulaiyaa; KK for "Aankhon Mein Teri" – Om Shanti Om; Sukhwinder Singh for "Chak De! India" – Chak De! India; Wajid and Labh Janjua for "Soni De Nakhre" – Partner	**Shreya Ghoshal for "Barso Re" – Guru**; Shreya Ghoshal for "Mere Dholna" – Bhool Bhulaiyaa; Shreya Ghoshal for "Ye Ishq Hai" – Jab We Met; Shreya Ghoshal for "Thode Badmash" – Saawariya; Sunidhi Chauhan for "Aaja Nachle" – Aaja Nachle

=== Backstage awards ===
Best Story	Best Screenplay
**Chak De! India – Jaideep Sahni**; Life in a... Metro – Anurag Basu; Gandhi, My Father – Feroz Abbas Khan; Jab We Met – Imtiaz Ali; Guru – Mani Ratnam; Cheeni Kum – R. Balki	**Chak De! India – Jaideep Sahni (joint winner)**; **Life in a... Metro – Anurag Basu (joint winner)**
Best Dialogue
**Imtiaz Ali for Jab We Met**

=== Technical awards ===
Best Art Direction	Best Action
**Om Shanti Om – Nitin Chandrakant Desai**	**Shootout at Lokhandwala – Javed Sheikh & Ejaz Sheikh''**
Best Cinematographer	Best Choreography
**Chak De! India – Sudeep Chatterjee**	**Aaja Nachle from Aaja Nachle – Vaibhavi Merchant**
Best Costume Design	Best Editing
**Om Shanti Om – Manish Malhotra, Karan Johar & Sanjeev Mulchandani**	**Chak De! India – Amitabh Shukla**
Best Makeup	Best Sound Recording
**Om Shanti Om – Bharat-Dorris, Ravi Indulkar & Namrata Soni**	**Chak De! India – Manas Choudhary & Ali Merchant**
Best Sound Re-Recording	Best Special Effects
**Chak De! India – Anuj Mathur & Ali Merchant**	**Om Shanti Om – Red Chillies Entertainment**

=== Special awards ===
==== Style Diva of the Year ====
- Katrina Kaif

==== Style Icon of the Year ====
- Abhishek Bachchan

==== Fresh Face of the Year ====
- Neil Nitin Mukesh

==== Outstanding Contribution to Indian Cinema ====
- Shyam Benegal

==== Outstanding Contribution by an Indian in International Cinema ====
- A. R. Rahman

==== Achievement in Indian Cinema ====
- Mumtaz

== Superlatives ==
Films with multiple nominations
Nominations	Film
11	Partner
10	Guru
9	Bhool Bhulaiyaa
9	Chak De! India
8	Life in a... Metro
6	Jab We Met
5	Om Shanti Om
5	Saawariya
3	Cheeni Kum
3	Shootout at Lokhandwala
2	Bheja Fry
2	Heyy Babyy

Films with multiple awards
Awards	Film
9	Chak De! India
6	Om Shanti Om
3	Life in a... Metro
2	Guru
2	Jab We Met
2	Saawariya
2	Shootout at Lokhandwala
