= Kurbaan (soundtrack) =

Kurbaan (Original Motion Picture Soundtrack)

Soundtrack album by Salim–Sulaiman
- Released: 12 October 2009
- Recorded: 2008–2009
- Studios: Blue Studios, Mumbai; Aslam Studios, Mumbai; YRF, Mumbai
- Genre: Feature film soundtrack
- Length: 24:08
- Languages: Hindi; Arabic
- Label: Sony Music India
- Producer: Salim–Sulaiman

Salim–Sulaiman chronology
| Luck (2009) | Kurbaan (Original Motion Picture Soundtrack) (2009) | Rocket Singh: Salesman of the Year (2009) |

Kurbaan (Original Motion Picture Soundtrack) is the soundtrack album to the 2009 film of the same name directed by Rensil D'Silva and produced by Dharma Productions and distributed by UTV Motion Pictures. The album featured six songs composed by Salim–Sulaiman with lyrics written by Niranjan Iyengar and Irfan Siddiqui. It was released under the Sony Music India label on 12 October 2009 to positive reviews from music critics and received a Filmfare Award nomination under the Best Male Playback Singer category for the song "Shukran Allah" performed by Sonu Nigam and Salim Merchant.

== Development ==
The duo Salim–Sulaiman were approached by Karan Johar for scoring Kurbaan, while they were composing the now shelved Koochie Koochie Hota Hai. As they were impressed by the story, they were also involved in composing the songs as well, while focused on the original score. As per Johar's request, the songs were composed with a Sufi touch.

"Shukran Allah" is originally composed as a prayer, but the duo then decided it to make it as a romantic number, as it based on Khan's character where he is paying gratitude to God for giving him the love of this life. The Arabic lines translate to "thank you Allah, and all the praise in this world is for you", which Merchant added on working in the song, that "[he] felt a strong connection with Allah. It became like a chant". Johar initially wanted to compose a song based on the lines of "Jiya Dhadak Dhadak Jaaye" from Kalyug (2005), but due to the context of the script, he composed the song "Shukran Allah". Salim Merchant further reiterated this in a 2022 interview to Bollywood Hungama, stating: "The first song itself depicts Saif's reading namaz and expressing his gratitude to God for finding his love. He completes his prayer and gets up in the scene. That's where the song starts."

"Ali Maula" was composed as a Sufi song with a "dark vibe into it". When they composed the song, they were unsure of its fitment in any film. They played it to Johar and D'Silva, who approved it for Kurbaan. In an interview with Radio Mirchi, Kapoor called the track as the turning point of the film, while Salim stated that the song "has a very special feeling to it" like "Aashayein" from Iqbal (2005) and the title track and "Maula Maula Le Le Meri Jaan" from Chak De! India (2007). "Kurbaan Hua" was composed with a "pop-rock kind of a groove", and was performed live in the McDowell's No.1 Yaari Jam, where the duo reinvented it numerous times during its live performance. The song "Rasiya" was picturized on an intimate scene between Khan and Kapoor, which Sulaiman described it as a "passionate" number. Being pictured on a married couple, they kept maturity in the composition keeping a balance of sensuality.

== Reception ==
The soundtrack received mixed-to-positive reviews from music critics. Critic Ruchika Kher of Hindustan Times assigned the album score of 3.5 out of 5 and stated: "On the whole, the album is worth checking out. Salim-Sulaiman have done a great job yet again." Sukanya Verma of Rediff rated the album 3 on 5 noted, "A compact soundtrack with a mix of sweet-sounding and soul-stirring melodies to offer, Kurbaan is worth sacrificing a few bucks at a music shop counter." Joginder Tuteja of Bollywood Hungama noted: "Kurbaan is a quality album all the way and clearly the best that Salim and Sulaiman have offered since Fashion (2008)."

== Track listing ==
Kurbaan (Original Motion Picture Soundtrack) track listing
| No. | Title | Lyrics | Singer(s) | Length |
|---|---|---|---|---|
| 1. | "Shukran Allah" | Niranjan Iyengar | Sonu Nigam, Salim Merchant, Shreya Ghoshal | 4:50 |
| 2. | "Dua" | Niranjan Iyengar | Sukhwinder Singh, Kailash Kher, Marianne D'Cruz Aiman | 5:00 |
| 3. | "Ali Maula" | Irfan Siddiqui | Salim Merchant | 4:37 |
| 4. | "Rasiya" | Niranjan Iyengar | Shruti Pathak, Kareena Kapoor | 3:05 |
| 5. | "Kurbaan Hua" | Niranjan Iyengar | Vishal Dadlani | 4:18 |
| 6. | "Ali Maula" (remix) | Irfan Siddiqui | Salim Merchant | 4:08 |
| Total length: | | | | 24:08 |

== Accolades ==
Accolades for Kurbaan (Original Motion Picture Soundtrack)
| Award | Date of ceremony (Note: Date is linked to the article about the awards held that year, wherever possible.) | Category | Recipients | Result | Ref. |
|---|---|---|---|---|---|
| Filmfare Awards | 27 February 2010 | Best Male Playback Singer | Sonu Nigam and Salim Merchant ("Shukran Allah") | Nominated | |
