= Rab Ne Bana Di Jodi (soundtrack) =

Soundtrack album by Salim–Sulaiman
- Released: 14 November 2008
- Recorded: 2008
- Studios: YRF Studios, Mumbai; Bernie Grundman Mastering, Los Angeles, California
- Genre: Feature film soundtrack
- Length: 29:25
- Language: Hindi
- Label: YRF Music
- Producer: Salim–Sulaiman

Salim–Sulaiman chronology
Fashion (2008)	Rab Ne Bana Di Jodi (2008)	8 X 10 Tasveer (2009)

Rab Ne Bana Di Jodi is the soundtrack album to the 2008 film of the same name directed and produced by Aditya Chopra of Yash Raj Films starring Shah Rukh Khan and Anushka Sharma. The soundtrack featured seven songs composed by Salim–Sulaiman with lyrics written by Jaideep Sahni. It was released under YRF Music label on 14 November 2008. The album was the first Bollywood soundtrack to reach the top 10 album sales for the ITunes Store and was the second highest-selling Bollywood soundtrack.

== Development ==
The soundtrack and background score were provided by Salim–Sulaiman who previously composed Chak De! India and Aaja Nachle (both 2007) for Yash Raj Films. While reading the script Sulaiman claimed that the film was "so well written, conceived with exact places and spots for songs" that were seamlessly integrated, and was briefed on having two distinct identities for the characters. He further added "the music had to be simple melodies that even the most basic person would be able to sing and get the feeling of comfort and love when you heard them." The 'mukhda' of "Haule Haule" was derived from Chopra's script as he hummed the tune for the lyrics, which sounded well in its rough basic form. Hence, the duo decided to develop the lyrics with Jaideep and keep the melody as simplistic.

While composing "Dance Pe Chance", Sulaiman recalled "Aditya [Chopra] told us 'Dance Pe Chance' was how you teach a child to dance. It started off when he started giving us - put your left leg and put your left leg out put your left leg in and shake it all about. So, it started from there and I felt like it just happened like this melody just came about it." The song was composed within two days, so with "Haule Haule" which composed very quickly. However, the song "Phir Milenge Chalte Chalte" took them more time to compose, because as the song being an homage to Bollywood actors Raj Kapoor, Dev Anand, Shammi Kapoor, Rajesh Khanna and Rishi Kapoor and actresses Nargis Dutt, Sadhana Shivdasani, Helen Khan, Sharmila Tagore and Neetu Singh, each verse had to be dedicated to them, with 2–3 days for each other. By that, the song was composed within 7–8 days.

It was very stressful and challenging. But Jaideep [Sahni] was writing [the lyrics] so fast like Pyaar Hua Ikraar Hua, Jeena Yahan, Marna Yahan... these are some famous phrases [from the legendary actors]. So, the melodies are also matching the original songs [...] every element of the phrase was matching the composition but it was different. It was very difficult."

— Salim–Sulaiman on composing "Phir Milenge Chalte Chalte"

Besides composing, the duo also produced the soundtrack. The album was mixed by Vijay Dayal at YRF Studios in Mumbai and was mastered by Brian "Big Bass" Gardner at Bernie Grundman Mastering in Hollywood, Los Angeles, California.

== Critical reception ==
Joginder Tuteja of Bollywood Hungama wrote "If the remaining songs too come close to 'Haule Haule' in the way they are picturised, rest assured RNBJD too would do well. Add to it the curiosity around SRK and Aditya Chopra coming together and the album can be expected to take a flying start at the stands." Nikhil Taneja, in his review for Hindustan Times described that the album is essential for "okey dokey listening, but certainly don't suggest the makings of a classic soundtrack".

G. P. Singh of Rediff.com wrote "Good dance music is infectious— it gets your feet twitching even if you don't want to. By that yardstick, Rab Ne Bana Di Jodi fails." Karthik Srinivasan of Milliblog wrote "Either Aditya Chopra had the composing duo on a tight, unnecessary leash or they've been smoking the wrong thing – it's a shame, since Salim Sulaiman just produced a cracker soundtrack in Fashion and are truly capable of so much more."

== Commercial reception ==
The soundtrack of Rab Ne Bana Di Jodi is the first Bollywood soundtrack to reach the top 10 album sales for the iTunes Store. According to the Indian trade website Box Office India, with around 19,00,000 units sold, this film's soundtrack album was the year's second highest-selling.

== Track listing ==
No.	Title	Singer(s)	Length
1.	"Haule Haule"	Sukhwinder Singh	04:25
2.	"Phir Milenge Chalte Chalte"	Sonu Nigam	06:36
3.	"Dance Pe Chance"	Sunidhi Chauhan, Labh Janjua	04:22
4.	"Tujh Mein Rab" (Male)	Roop Kumar Rathod	04:43
5.	"Tujh Mein Rab" (Female)	Shreya Ghoshal	01:44
6.	"Dancing Jodi"	Instrumental	03:59
7.	"Tujh Mein Rab" (Hinglish Mashup)	Roop Kumar Rathod, Jay Kadn	03:33

== Awards ==
Award	Category	Recipients and nominees	Results	Ref.
54th Filmfare Awards	Best Male Playback Singer	Sukhwinder Singh for "Haule Haule"	Nominated	
54th Filmfare Awards	Best Female Playback Singer	Sunidhi Chauhan for "Dance Pe Chance"	Nominated	
International Indian Film Academy Awards	Best Lyrics	Jaideep Sahni for "Haule Haule"	Nominated	
International Indian Film Academy Awards	Best Male Playback Singer	Sukhwinder Singh for "Haule Haule"	Nominated	
Apsara Film and Television Producers Guild Awards	Best Lyrics	Jaideep Sahni for "Tujh Mein Rab Dikhta Hai"	Won	
Apsara Film and Television Producers Guild Awards	Best Female Playback Singer	Shreya Ghoshal for "Tujh Mein Rab Dikhta Hai"	Won	
Star Screen Awards	Best Lyricist	Jaideep Sahni for "Haule Haule"	Nominated	
Star Screen Awards	Best Male Playback Singer	Sukhwinder Singh for "Haule Haule"	Nominated	
Star Screen Awards	Best Female Playback Singer	Sunidhi Chauhan for "Dance Pe Chance"	Nominated	
