= Life in a... Metro =

2007 Indian film by Anurag Basu

- Theatrical release poster
- Directed by: Anurag Basu
- Screenplay by: Anurag Basu
- Dialogues by: Sanjeev Dutta
- Story by: Anurag Basu
- Produced by: Ronnie Screwvala
- Starring: Dharmendra; Shilpa Shetty; Kay Kay Menon; Shiney Ahuja; Irrfan Khan; Konkona Sen Sharma; Sharman Joshi; Kangana Ranaut; Nafisa Ali
- Cinematography: Bobby Singh
- Edited by: Akiv Ali
- Music by: Songs: Pritam; Score: Raju Singh
- Production company: UTV Motion Pictures
- Distributed by: UTV Motion Pictures
- Release date: 11 May 2007
- Running time: 132 minutes
- Country: India
- Language: Hindi
- Budget: ₹9.50 crore
- Box office: ₹24.45 crore

Life in a... Metro is a 2007 Indian Hindi-language drama film co-produced, co-written, and directed by Anurag Basu. Partly inspired by Billy Wilder's romantic comedy film The Apartment (1960), it features an ensemble cast of Dharmendra, Nafisa Ali, Shilpa Shetty, Kay Kay Menon, Shiney Ahuja, Irrfan Khan, Konkona Sen Sharma, Kangana Ranaut, and Sharman Joshi in lead roles. The music is composed by Pritam with lyrics written by Sayeed Quadri, Sandeep Shrivastava, and Amitabh Verma. It narrates the lives of nine people living in Mumbai and deals with topics such as extramarital affairs, sanctity of marriage, commitment phobia, and love.

Made on a budget of ₹95 million, Life in a... Metro was released on 11 May 2007 and was a surprise commercial success at the box office, grossing over ₹245 million worldwide. It received widespread critical acclaim upon release, with high praise for its novel concept, story, screenplay, dialogues, soundtrack and performances of the ensemble cast.

At the 53rd Filmfare Awards, Life in a... Metro received six nominations, including Best Director (Basu) and Best Music Director (Pritam), and won three awards – Best Supporting Actor (Khan), Best Supporting Actress (Sen Sharma) and Best Screenplay (Basu).

== Plot ==
Rahul, who is eager to move up the ranks in his call center job, lends his apartment to people connected to his boss, Ranjit, for bringing their girlfriends and affair interests in turn for recommendation. He silently loves Neha, his colleague, who has risen up in the ranks easily due to her relationship with Ranjit. Meanwhile, Ranjit is very unhappy with his marriage with his wife Shikha with whom he has an eight-year-old daughter. Shikha, who often meets her aunt, Shivani in her Bharatanatyam classes, reads out a letter from the US from Amol, whom Shivani loved forty years ago, but he left her to pursue his dreams in the US. Amol conveys through the letter that he is probably coming to India for the last time and wishes to meet Shivani and spend his last days with her. Shivani agrees.

Shikha's sister, Shruti, is 27 and very eager to get married and meets many prospective grooms. Among them is Monty, who Shruti finds very weird and old. Shruti is Neha's roommate and Neha knows that Shruti is Ranjit's sister-in-law. One day, Shikha meets Akash, an unsuccessful theatre artist and a divorcee at a bus stop. He practices drama with his friends in the floor above Shivani's Bharatanatyam classes. They start off as friends, but slowly start getting close and visit places non-romantically. Monty helps Shruti get a job in his company and they become friends. Monty also conveys that his mother has found an ideal bride for him, and asks Shruti's help with the wedding shopping. Shruti slowly starts falling for Monty. Amol and Shivani, who have rekindled their love spend one night together. In the morning, Shivani wakes up and experiences some pains, at which point Amol calls for an ambulance. She dies in his arms.

During one of their meetings in Rahul's apartment, Neha and Ranjit have an intense argument and Ranjit leaves. Neha, upset, attempts suicide by drinking phenyl. Rahul finds her passed out in the bathroom and calls his neighbor who is a doctor; they are able to save Neha by making her vomit and admit her in a hospital. Rahul calls up Ranjit, who has left for Bangalore due to an urgent business, who tells him to take care of Neha for a few days. He starts taking care of her and they form a special bond. One day, he takes her to the outskirts of the city to an unfinished house. He explains to Neha that his father's dream was to build a house or a restaurant, and he had invested everything into that property. But he did not have enough money to complete the ceiling and a few parts of the house. Now, Rahul is determined to fulfill his father's dream.

Shruti, who managed to track down Neha in Rahul's house, realizes that she had attempted suicide, misunderstands the situation and slaps Rahul. Afterwards, she finds out that Ranjit was having an affair with Neha. Meanwhile, Shikha visits Akash in his home, where they get physically close. Just before they get even more intimate, Shikha realizes her boundaries and hurriedly leaves Akash's home. Ranjit, who has arrived at home, sees Shikha crying and misunderstands that Shruti has told about Ranjit's affair. Ranjit then confesses himself. After confessing, Shikha says that Shruti never told her anything and confesses her friendship and closeness with Akash. Ranjit, enraged, decides to move-in with Neha. Monty announces his wedding date to Shruti, who has fallen for him. Ranjit asks Rahul for the keys to which he resigns from his job, and him, upset with the way the city has treated him, decides to leave Mumbai by train.

On the day of Monty's wedding, Rahul decides to leave, Ranjit is on the way to take Neha to a hotel, and Akash sends Shikha her handbag which she left in his house. He also sends her a letter that says that he is ready to accept her the way she is: a housewife, or as a modern girl. He also writes that he has been offered a job in Dubai and he is ready to leave for the airport by train and she must come with him. While traveling with Ranjit, Neha realizes that she loves Rahul and starts chasing his taxi to the railway station. Shruti conveys her feelings to Monty right before the wedding and leaves. Monty also realizes that he loves Shruti and chases her taxi to the same railway station on the wedding horse. Shikha dresses up and goes to the railway station.

At the railway station, Monty chases Shruti, Neha chases Rahul, and Shikha searches for Akash. Neha catches up to Rahul and they patch things up. Monty finally finds Shruti in a ladies compartment and enters it. They realize their love for each other and hug. Shikha finds Akash, but tells him that she is not going to come with him and wishes him the best for his job in Dubai and leaves. The film ends with Rahul and Neha eating dinner with the doctor and his wife from their neighborhood, Shruti and Monty, who have married, waiting in a traffic signal with their three-year-old child and Akash still roaming the streets of Mumbai. Shikha and Ranjit are also now in a much more happy and healthy relationship.

== Cast ==
L.I.M interrelationship diagram

- Dharmendra as Amol, Shivani's childhood love interest
- Shilpa Shetty as Shikha Ghosh Kapoor, Ranjit's wife, Shruti's sister, Shivani's niece, Akash's love interest
- Kay Kay Menon as Ranjit Kapoor, Shikha's husband, Shruti's brother-in-law, Neha's boss/love interest, Rahul's boss
- Shiney Ahuja as Akash Sharma, Shikha's love interest
- Irrfan Khan as Monty, Shruti's love interest
- Konkona Sen Sharma as Shruti Ghosh, Shikha's sister, Ranjit's sister-in-law, Shivani's niece, Monty's love interest, Neha's roommate
- Sharman Joshi as Rahul Dhupia, Ranjit's subordinate, Neha's colleague
- Kangana Ranaut as Neha Grewal, Shruti's roommate, Ranjit's love interest, Rahul's crush
- Nafisa Ali as Shivani, Amol's childhood love interest, Shikha and Shruti's aunt
- Ashwin Mushran as Abdullah Ansari, Shruti's boss
- Manoj Pahwa as Dr. Pritam Ahuja, Rahul's neighbor
- Pritam as Rock Band Leader (Cameo appearance)

== Soundtrack ==
The soundtrack was released on 17 March 2007. Life In A... Metro's music was composed by Pritam with lyrics by Sayeed Quadri, Amitabh Verma and Sandeep Srivastava. Bob Dylan's "I Want You" plays in the background when Shruti and Rishi are at a vending machine and Shruti mistakes Rishi to be gesturing and speaking with her. The song does not appear on the soundtrack. According to the Indian trade website Box Office India, with around 11,00,000 units sold, this film's soundtrack album was the year's twelfth highest-selling.

=== Production ===
The song "Alvida" was composed by Pritam back in the 1990s when he was a struggling artist.

=== Metro Band ===
Pritam formed the band Metro with Suhail Kaul and the Bangladeshi singer Fahruk Mahfuz Anam (James) that performed the songs in the film.

During certain song sequences in the film, the band led by Pritam appears on screen at performing the songs as the scenes play out. The music score in Life In A... Metro is heavily rock-oriented. The four-members were Pritam, Suhail Kaul, Soham Chakraborty and Bangladeshi singer James.

== Accolades ==
Award (Note: Awards, festivals and organizations are in alphabetical order.)	Date of ceremony (Note: Date is linked to the article about the awards held that year, wherever possible.)	Category	Recipient(s)	Result	Ref.
Filmfare Awards	16 February 2008	Best Director	Anurag Basu	Nominated	
Filmfare Awards	16 February 2008	Best Screenplay	Anurag Basu	Won	
Filmfare Awards	16 February 2008	Best Dialogue	Sanjeev Dutta	Nominated	
Filmfare Awards	16 February 2008	Best Supporting Actor	Irrfan Khan	Won	
Filmfare Awards	16 February 2008	Best Supporting Actress	Konkona Sen Sharma	Won	
Filmfare Awards	16 February 2008	Best Music Director	Pritam	Nominated	
International Indian Film Academy Awards	6 – 8 June 2008	Best Film	Life in a... Metro – UTV Motion Pictures	Nominated	
International Indian Film Academy Awards	6 – 8 June 2008	Best Director	Anurag Basu	Nominated	
International Indian Film Academy Awards	6 – 8 June 2008	Best Story	Anurag Basu	Nominated	
International Indian Film Academy Awards	6 – 8 June 2008	Best Screenplay	Anurag Basu	Won	
International Indian Film Academy Awards	6 – 8 June 2008	Best Supporting Actress	Konkona Sen Sharma	Won	
International Indian Film Academy Awards	6 – 8 June 2008	Best Supporting Actor	Irrfan Khan	Won	
International Indian Film Academy Awards	6 – 8 June 2008	Best Performance in a Comic Role	Irrfan Khan	Nominated	
International Indian Film Academy Awards	6 – 8 June 2008	Best Performance in a Negative Role	Kay Kay Menon	Nominated	
International Indian Film Academy Awards	6 – 8 June 2008	Best Lyricist	Sayeed Quadri – for ("In Dino")	Nominated	
Producers Guild Film Awards	30 March 2008	Best Film	Life in a... Metro – Ronnie Screwvala	Nominated	
Producers Guild Film Awards	30 March 2008	Best Director	Anurag Basu	Nominated	
Producers Guild Film Awards	30 March 2008	Best Screenplay	Anurag Basu	Nominated	
Producers Guild Film Awards	30 March 2008	Best Actress in a Leading Role	Shilpa Shetty	Nominated	
Producers Guild Film Awards	30 March 2008	Best Actress in a Supporting Role	Konkona Sen Sharma	Won	
Producers Guild Film Awards	30 March 2008	Best Actor in a Supporting Role	Irrfan Khan	Won	
Producers Guild Film Awards	30 March 2008	Best Actor in a Comic Role	Irrfan Khan	Nominated	
Producers Guild Film Awards	30 March 2008	Best Actor in a Negative Role	Kay Kay Menon	Nominated	
Producers Guild Film Awards	30 March 2008	Best Music Director	Pritam	Nominated	
Producers Guild Film Awards	30 March 2008	Best Male Playback Singer	Soham Chakrabarty – for ("In Dino")	Nominated	
Producers Guild Film Awards	30 March 2008	Best Dialogue	Sanjeev Dutta	Nominated	
Producers Guild Film Awards	30 March 2008	Best Cinematography	Bobby Singh	Nominated	
Producers Guild Film Awards	30 March 2008	Best Editing	Akiv Ali	Nominated	
Producers Guild Film Awards	30 March 2008	Best Sound Recording	Hitendra Ghosh	Nominated	
Screen Awards	10 January 2008	Best Film	Life in a... Metro	Nominated	
Screen Awards	10 January 2008	Best Director	Anurag Basu	Nominated	
Screen Awards	10 January 2008	Best Story	Anurag Basu	Nominated	
Screen Awards	10 January 2008	Best Screenplay	Anurag Basu	Won	
Screen Awards	10 January 2008	Best Supporting Actor	Sharman Joshi	Nominated	
Screen Awards	10 January 2008	Best Supporting Actress	Konkona Sen Sharma	Nominated	
Screen Awards	10 January 2008	Best Actor in a Comic Role	Irrfan Khan	Won	
Screen Awards	10 January 2008	Best Music Director	Pritam	Nominated	
Screen Awards	10 January 2008	Best Lyricist	Sayeed Quadri – for ("In Dino")	Nominated	
Screen Awards	10 January 2008	Best Male Playback Singer	Soham Chakrabarty – for ("In Dino")	Won	
Screen Awards	10 January 2008	Best Dialogue	Sanjeev Dutta	Nominated	
Screen Awards	10 January 2008	Best Cinematography	Bobby Singh	Nominated	
Screen Awards	10 January 2008	Best Editing	Akiv Ali	Nominated	
Screen Awards	10 January 2008	Best Background Music	Raju Singh	Nominated	
Stardust Awards	25 January 2008	Best Film	Life in a... Metro	Nominated	
Stardust Awards	25 January 2008	Dream Director	Anurag Basu	Nominated	
Stardust Awards	25 January 2008	Supporting Actor	Irrfan Khan	Nominated	
Stardust Awards	25 January 2008	Best Supporting Actress	Konkona Sen Sharma	Nominated	
Stardust Awards	25 January 2008	Breakthrough Performance – Female	Kangana Ranaut	Won	
Stardust Awards	25 January 2008	New Musical Sensation – Male	Soham Chakrabarty – for ("In Dino")	Nominated	
Stardust Awards	25 January 2008	New Musical Sensation – Male	Suhail Kaul – ("Baatein Kuch Ankahein Si")	Nominated	
Stardust Awards	25 January 2008	Standout Performance by a Lyricist	Sandeep Srivastava – ("Baatein Kuch Ankahein Si")	Nominated	
Zee Cine Awards	26 April 2008	Best Film	Life in a... Metro	Nominated	
Zee Cine Awards	26 April 2008	Best Director	Anurag Basu	Nominated	
Zee Cine Awards	26 April 2008	Best Actor in a Supporting Role – Male	Irrfan Khan	Nominated	
Zee Cine Awards	26 April 2008	Best Actor in a Supporting Role – Female	Konkona Sen Sharma	Nominated	
Zee Cine Awards	26 April 2008	Best Actor in a Supporting Role – Female	Shilpa Shetty	Won	
Zee Cine Awards	26 April 2008	Best Music Director	Pritam	Nominated	
Zee Cine Awards	26 April 2008	Best Lyricist	Sayeed Quadri – for ("In Dino")	Nominated	
Zee Cine Awards	26 April 2008	Best Male Playback Singer	Soham Chakrabarty – for ("In Dino")	Nominated	
Zee Cine Awards	26 April 2008	Best Track of the Year	"In Dino"	Nominated	

== Sequel ==
Its sequel titled Metro... In Dino was announced in 2022 with Basu and Pritam returning as director and music composer. The sequel released in 2025, starred Anupam Kher, Neena Gupta, Konkona Sen Sharma, Pankaj Tripathi, Aditya Roy Kapur, Sara Ali Khan, Ali Fazal and Fatima Sana Shaikh in lead roles.
