= IIFA Award for Best Supporting Actress =

International Indian Film Academy Award

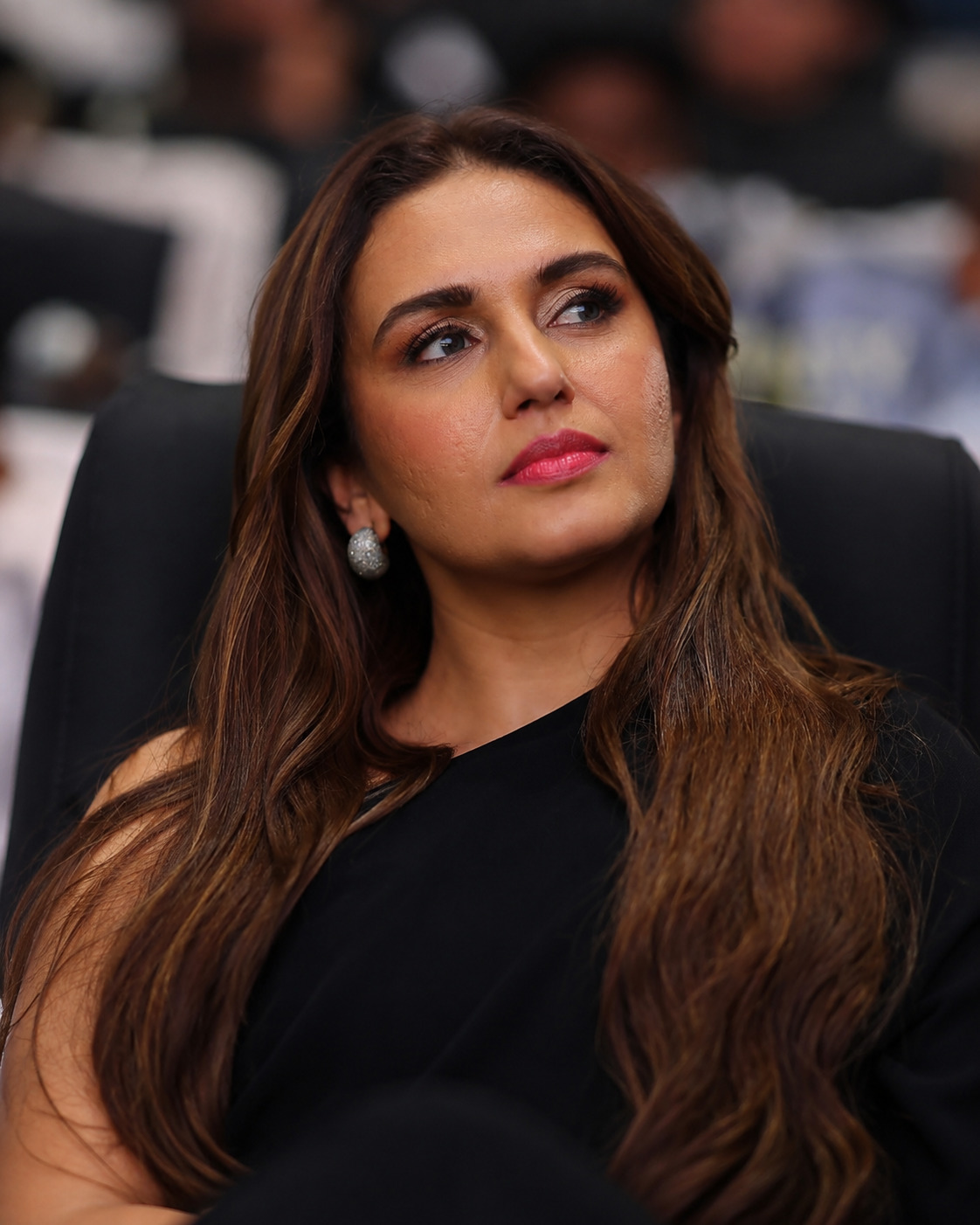
- The 2026 Recipient: Huma Qureshi
- Awarded for: Best Performance by an Actress in a Supporting Role
- Country: India
- Presented by: International Indian Film Academy
- First award: Sushmita Sen, Biwi No.1 (2000)
- Currently held by: Huma Qureshi, Jolly LLB 3 (2026)
- Website: http://www.iifa.com

The IIFA Award for Best Supporting Actress is chosen by the viewers and the winner is announced at the ceremony.

The award is given in the current year, but the actress who wins it is awarded for the previous year.

== Superlatives ==
=== Multiple winners ===
- 3 Wins: Jaya Bachchan
- 2 Wins: Divya Dutta

=== Multiple nominees ===
- 5 Nominations: Kirron Kher, Divya Dutta
- 4 Nominations: Konkona Sen Sharma, Tabu, Jaya Bachchan
- 3 Nominations: Rekha, Rani Mukerji, Kalki Koechlin, Juhi Chawla, Swara Bhasker
- 2 Nominations: Sushmita Sen, Kareena Kapoor, Bipasha Basu, Shernaz Patel, Sonali Kulkarni, Kangana Ranaut, Huma Qureshi, Ratna Pathak Shah, Richa Chadha, Seema Pahwa, Amrita Singh, Lara Dutta, Radhika Apte, Shabana Azmi, Vidya Balan

Superlative	Actor	Record
Actor with most awards	Jaya Bachchan	3
Actor with most nominations	Kirron Kher; Divya Dutta	5
Actor with most nominations without ever winning	Rekha; Bipasha Basu; Kalki Koechlin	3
Actor with most nominations in a single year	Sushmita Sen (2000); Rani Mukerji (2005); Kirron Kher (2007); Konkona Sen Sharma (2008); Seema Pahwa (2018)	2
Eldest Winner	Jaya Bachchan (Kal Ho Naa Ho)	56
Eldest Nominee	Zohra Sehgal (Cheeni Kum)	96
Youngest Winner	Ayesha Kapur (Black)	11
Youngest Nominee	Ayesha Kapur (Black)	11

- Only five actresses have won both Best Supporting Actress and Best Actress award; In chronological order they are: Rani Mukerji, Kangana Ranaut, Anushka Sharma, Tabu and Priyanka Chopra.
- Parineeti Chopra and Priyanka Chopra are the only cousins who have won the award.

== List of winners ==
† – indicates the performance also won the Filmfare Award for Best Supporting Actress
‡ – indicates the performance was also nominated for the Filmfare Award for Best Supporting Actress

=== 2000s ===
- 2000 Sushmita Sen – Biwi No.1 as Rupali †
  - Aruna Irani – Haseena Maan Jaayegi as Santho Verma
  - Reema Lagoo – Vaastav: The Reality as Shanta ‡
  - Sushmita Sen – Sirf Tum as Neha Kumari ‡
  - Tabu – Biwi No.1 as Lovely
- 2001 Jaya Bachchan – Fiza as Nishatbi Ikramullah †
  - Mahima Chaudhry – Dhadkan as Sheetal Varma ‡
  - Namrata Shirodkar – Pukar as Pooja Mallapa
  - Sonali Bendre – Hamara Dil Aapke Paas Hai as Khushi Malhotra
  - Sonali Kulkarni – Mission Kashmir as Neelama Khan ‡
- 2002 Jaya Bachchan – Kabhi Khushi Kabhie Gham as Nandini Raichand †
  - Bipasha Basu – Ajnabee as Neeta (Fake Sonia)
  - Kareena Kapoor – Kabhi Khushi Kabhie Gham as Pooja Sharma a.k.a. Poo ‡
  - Madhuri Dixit – Lajja as Janki ‡
  - Rekha – Lajja as Ramdulaari ‡
- 2003 Kirron Kher – Devdas as Sumitra Chakraborty ‡
  - Kareena Kapoor – Mujhse Dosti Karoge! as Tina
- 2004 Jaya Bachchan – Kal Ho Naa Ho as Jennifer Kapur †
  - Juhi Chawla – Jhankaar Beats as Shanti
  - Maya Alagh – LOC Kargil as Manoj Pandey's mother
  - Rekha – Koi... Mil Gaya as Sonia Mehra ‡
  - Shoma Anand – Hungama as Anjali Tiwari
- 2005 Rani Mukerji – Veer-Zaara as Saamiya Siddiqui ‡
  - Divya Dutta – Veer-Zaara as Shabbo ‡
  - Esha Deol – Dhoom as Sheena
  - Kishori Ballal – Swades as Kaveri Amma
  - Rani Mukerji – Yuva as Shashi Biswas †
- 2006 Ayesha Kapur – Black as Young Michelle McNally †
  - Juhi Chawla – My Brother…Nikhil as Anamika
  - Lara Dutta – No Entry as Kaajal (Kishan's wife)
  - Shernaz Patel – Black as Akram Sheikh
  - Shweta Prasad – Iqbal as Khadija ‡
- 2007 Soha Ali Khan – Rang De Basanti as Sonia/Durgawati Devi ‡
  - Kirron Kher – Kabhi Alvida Naa Kehna as Kamaljit 'Kamal' Saran ‡
  - Kirron Kher – Rang De Basanti as Mitro ‡
  - Konkona Sen Sharma – Omkara as Indu †
  - Preity Zinta – Kabhi Alvida Naa Kehna as Rhea Saran ‡
  - Rekha – Krrish as Sonia Mehra ‡
- 2008 Konkona Sen Sharma – Life in a... Metro as Shruti †
  - Chitrashi Rawat – Chak De! India as Komal Chautala
  - Konkona Sen Sharma – Laaga Chunari Mein Daag as Shubhavari Sahay / Chutki
  - Rani Mukerji – Saawariya as Gulabji ‡
  - Vidya Balan – Guru as Meenakshi "Meenu" Saxena
  - Zohra Sehgal – Cheeni Kum as Buddhadev's mother
- 2009 Kangana Ranaut – Fashion as Shonali Gujral †
  - Bipasha Basu – Bachna Ae Haseeno as Radhika/Shreya Rathore ‡
  - Ila Arun – Jodhaa Akbar as Maham Anga
  - Kirron Kher – Dostana as Sameer's mother ‡
  - Shahana Goswami – Rock On!! as Debbie ‡

=== 2010s ===
- 2010 Divya Dutta – Delhi-6 as Jalebi ‡
  - Arundhati Nag – Paa as Vidya's mother ‡
  - Kalki Koechlin – Dev.D as Leni/Chandramukhi (Chanda) †
  - Kirron Kher – Kurbaan as Aapa
  - Supriya Pathak – Wake Up Sid as Sarita ‡
- 2011 Prachi Desai – Once Upon A Time In Mumbaai as Mumtaz ‡
  - Amrita Puri – Aisha as Shefali Thakur ‡
  - Dimple Kapadia – Dabangg as Naini Devi
  - Ratna Pathak – Golmaal 3 as Geeta ‡
  - Shernaz Patel – Guzaarish as Devyani Dutta
- 2012 Parineeti Chopra – Ladies vs Ricky Bahl as Dimple Chaddha ‡
  - Divya Dutta – Stanley Ka Dabba as Ms. Rosy
  - Kalki Koechlin – Zindagi Na Milegi Dobara as Natasha ‡
  - Sonali Kulkarni – Singham as Megha Kadam
  - Swara Bhaskar – Tanu Weds Manu as Payal ‡
- 2013 Anushka Sharma – Jab Tak Hai Jaan as Akira Rai †
  - Diana Penty – Cocktail as Meera Sahni
  - Divya Dutta – Heroine as Pallavi Narayan
  - Dolly Ahluwalia – Vicky Donor as Mrs. Arora
  - Jacqueline Fernandez – Housefull 2 as Bobby
  - Reema Sen – Gangs of Wasseypur – Part 1 as Durga
- 2014 Divya Dutta – Bhaag Milkha Bhaag as Ishri Kaur ‡
  - Kalki Koechlin – Yeh Jawaani Hai Deewani as Aditi Mehra ‡
  - Kangana Ranaut – Krrish 3 as Kaya
  - Richa Chadha – Goliyon Ki Raasleela Ram-Leela as Rasila
  - Shruti Haasan – D-Day as Suraiya
  - Swara Bhaskar – Raanjhanaa as Bindiya ‡
- 2015 Tabu – Haider as Ghazala Meer †
  - Amrita Singh – 2 States as Kavita Malhotra ‡
  - Huma Qureshi – Dedh Ishqiya as Muniya
  - Juhi Chawla – Gulaab Gang as Sumitra Devi ‡
  - Lisa Haydon – Queen as Vijayalakshmi ‡
- 2016 Priyanka Chopra – Bajirao Mastani as Kashibai †
  - Huma Qureshi – Badlapur as Jhimli ‡
  - Konkona Sen Sharma – Talvar as Nutan Tandon
  - Tanvi Azmi – Bajirao Mastani as Radhabai ‡
- 2017 Shabana Azmi – Neerja as Rama Bhanot †
  - Andrea Tariang – Pink as Andrea Tariang
  - Disha Patani – M.S. Dhoni: The Untold Story as Priyanka Jha
  - Ratna Pathak Shah – Kapoor & Sons as Sunita Kapoor ‡
  - Richa Chadha – Sarbjit as Sukhpreet Kaur ‡
  - Kirti Kulhari – Pink as Falak Ali
- 2018 Meher Vij – Secret Superstar as Najma Malik †
  - Neha Dhupia – Tumhari Sulu as Maryam "Maria" Sood
  - Seema Pahwa – Bareilly Ki Barfi as Susheela Mishra ‡
  - Seema Pahwa – Shubh Mangal Saavdhan as Sugandha's mother ‡
  - Tabu – Golmaal Again as Anna Matthew
- 2019 Aditi Rao Hydari – Padmaavat as Mehrunissa
  - Neena Gupta – Mulk as Tabassum Mohammed
  - Radhika Apte – Andhadhun as Sophie
  - Swara Bhaskar – Veere Di Wedding as Sakshi Soni ‡
  - Surekha Sikri – Badhaai Ho as Durga Kaushik †

=== 2020s ===
- 2020 Kiara Advani – Good Newwz as Monica Batra
  - Amrita Singh – Badla as Rani Kaur ‡
  - Yami Gautam – Bala as Pari Mishra
  - Sayani Gupta – Article 15 as Gaura
  - Amruta Subhash – Gully Boy as Razia Ahmed †
- 2022 Sai Tamhankar – Mimi as Shama †
  - Gauhar Khan – 14 Phere as Zubina
  - Lara Dutta – Bell Bottom as Indira Gandhi
  - Radhika Madan – Angrezi Medium as Taarika "Taaru" Bansal
  - Shalini Vatsa – Ludo as Lata Kutty
- 2023 Mouni Roy – Brahmāstra: Part One – Shiva as Junoon ‡
  - Nimrat Kaur – Dasvi as Bimla Devi "Bimmo" Chaudhary
  - Radhika Apte – Monica, O My Darling as ACP Vijayashanti Naidu
  - Sheeba Chadha – Badhaai Do as Mrs. Thakur †
  - Tabu – Drishyam 2 as Meera Deshmukh
- 2024 Shabana Azmi – Rocky Aur Rani Kii Prem Kahaani as Jamini Chatterjee †
  - Geeta Agarwal Sharma – 12th Fail as Pushpa Sharma
  - Jaya Bachchan – Rocky Aur Rani Kii Prem Kahaani as Dhanlakshmi Randhawa ‡
  - Sanya Malhotra – Sam Bahadur as Silloo Manekshaw
  - Triptii Dimri – Animal as Zoya ‡
- 2025 Janki Bodiwala – Shaitaan as Jahnvi Rishi
  - Chhaya Kadam – Laapataa Ladies as Manju Maai
  - Jyothika – Srikanth as Devika Malvade
  - Priyamani – Article 370 as Rajeshwari Swaminathan
  - Vidya Balan – Bhool Bhulaiyaa 3 as Rajkumari Manjulika / Mallika

== See also ==
- IIFA Awards
- Bollywood
- Cinema of India
