= Mir Ranjan Negi =

Indian field hockey player

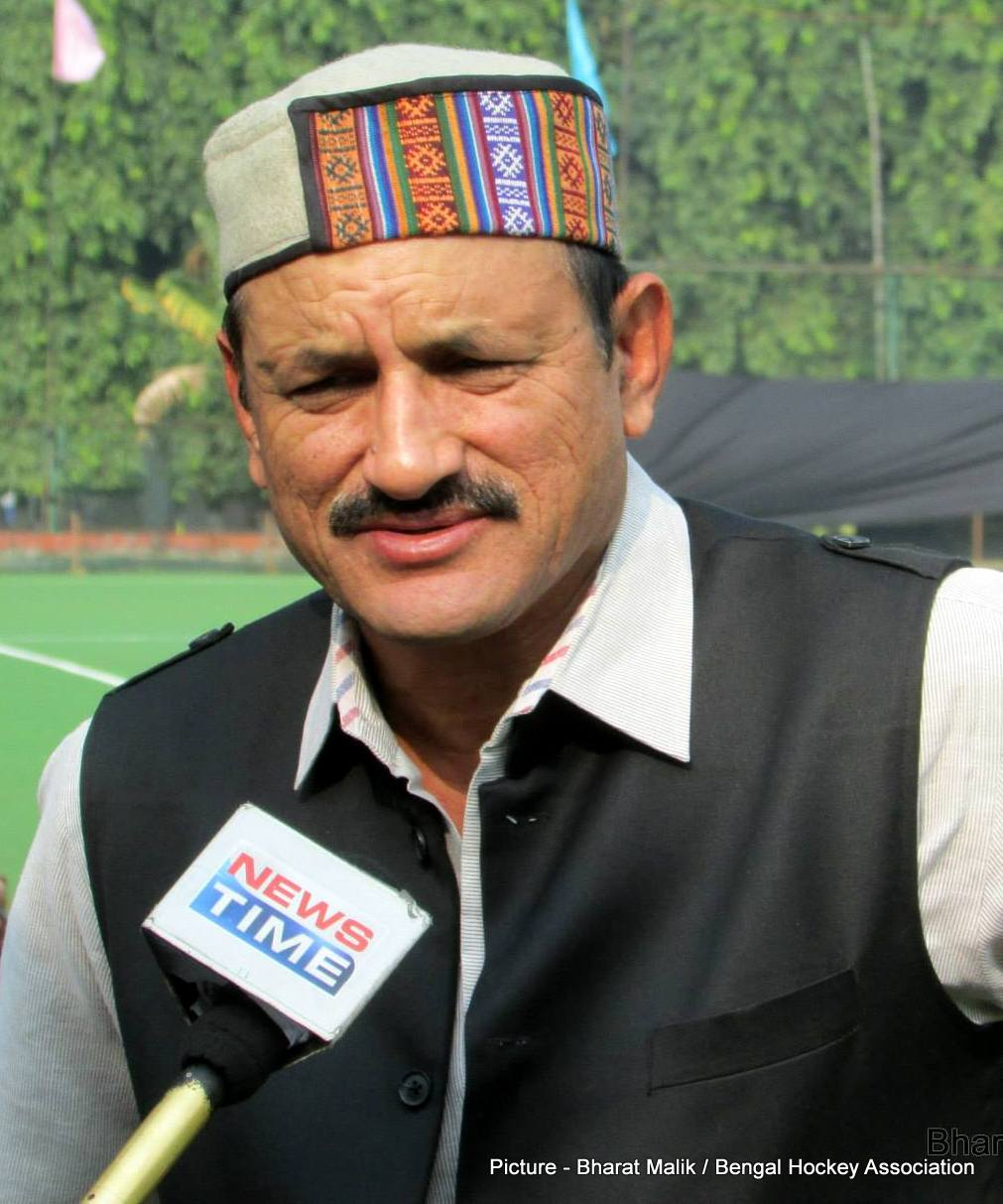
- Born: Almora

Olympic medal record

Men's Field Hockey
Silver medal – second place	1982 Delhi	Team

Mir Ranjan Negi is a field hockey player and former goalkeeper of the India men's national field hockey team. He was involved with the development of the 2007 film, Chak De India.

He was born in Almora district of Uttarakhand.

== 1982 Asian Games ==
In the 1982 Asian Games, Negi was the goalkeeper for the India men's national field hockey team in the final field hockey match against Pakistan. India lost 1-7, which brought "unprecedented humiliation for India in a sporting arena. The nation went into a mourning and Negi into hiding. Negi was accused in some quarters of having conceded those goals." Of the event, journalist Anand Philar stated, "I had covered the 7-1 drubbing Pakistan handed out to India in the 1982 Asian Games final, which turned goalkeeper Negi's life upside down. He was literally pilloried by armchair critics, the media and an ignorant public for letting in so many goals. Some of the tabloids even ran headlines crying out that Pakistan had bribed Negi and that he was a 'traitor.'" In an interview with Philar after the event, Negi stated, "Everywhere I went, I was abused by the public. Nothing matters to me more than playing for my country. I am a proud Indian and will always be so. There were lots of things that happened in the run-up to the final. You find out. I will not speak about the politics that contributed to our defeat." Former captain Zafar Iqbal later stated, "The entire team was to blame; we forwards missed chances, the defence left huge gaps that the Pakistanis exploited. Despite making great efforts to cover the gaps, poor Negi became a sitting duck and the Pakistanis scored at will [...] He was blamed solely, but every player was to blame [...] The atmosphere was vicious. I remember someone claiming that he had seen Negi come out of the Pakistan High Commission on match eve [...]." Afterwards, he was let go by the Indian Hockey Federation and quit the game for many years.

== Later career ==
He returned as a goalkeeping coach for the 1998 Asian Games in which the India men's national field hockey team won the Gold. This position, however, only proved temporary and he left the game once again. Four years later, Negi was hired to be the goalkeeping coach of the India women's national field hockey team. The team won the Gold at the 2002 Commonwealth Games. He was also the assistant coach for the Women's team when it won the Gold at the 2004 Hockey Asia Cup. Currently he is working in Acropolis Institute of Technology and Research, Indore as Director of Sports.

== Chak De India ==
Negi would later become involved in the development of the 2007 Hindi-language film Chak De India. Its screenplay was written by screenwriter Jaideep Sahni. Sahni had read an article about the winning of the Gold at the 2002 Commonwealth Games by the India women's national field hockey team and thought that the premise would make an interesting film. Negi has often been compared with Kabir Khan in the media.

On this connection Negi later commented, "This movie is not a documentary of Mir Ranjan Negi's life. It is in fact the story of a team that becomes a winning lot from a bunch of hopeless girls [...] There is nothing called World Championships in international hockey. It would be stupid to believe that Yash Raj Films would pump in Rs.45 crores to make a documentary on me. So it's illogical that it is a documentation of my life."

Sahni further stated in an interview with The Hindu:

I felt why has the girls' team been given so little coverage. I shared the idea with Aditya (Chopra). He liked it and said stop everything else and concentrate on it. I started my research by spending time with hockey players [...] It's just a matter of chance that Negi's story matches with Kabir Khan. There are many cases, like in Colombia, football players are killed for not performing well for the club. I had no idea about Negi's story while writing the script, and he joined us after the script was ready. In fact, his name was suggested by M.K. Kaushik, who was the coach of the team that won the Commonwealth Games’ gold. On day one, when Negi read the script, he cried and it was then that we came to know about his story.

Sahni also stated in another interview with NDTV.com that the script was conceived before he met Negi:

"Our script was written a year and a half back. It is very unfortunate that something, which is about women athletes, has just started becoming about Negi. And if you would go and ask Negi, he would probably tell you that he came and read the script that was written a year and a half back, and he started crying. Next day, he came and said look, it had happened to me also."

Both Kaushik and Negi did influence the development of the film after being approached by Sahni. Sahni first met with Kaushik and later recalled that, "M K Kaushik and his girls taught us all we knew about hockey. Then he recommended Negi to us, because when we finished from different backgrounds and cultures, the psychological factors involved. Also how the coach faces pressure to select girls from different states and teams." Sahni also contacted Negi and asked him to coach the actors portraying the hockey team. While not initially enthusiastic about being involved in the film, Negi changed his mind after reading the screenplay. He acted as the coach and trainer for the cast stating, "I trained the girls for six months. Waking up at 4, travelling from Kandivili to Churchgate. We would retire around 11 in the night. It was tiring. But we were on a mission [...] They couldn't run; couldn’t hold the hockey sticks. I ensured none of them [would have to] cut their nails or eyebrows (as the players do). The girls have worked very hard. I salute them." Some of the actors however, such as Chitrashi, Sandia, and Raynia were cast because they are actual hockey players. Negi also had to train Shahrukh Khan for the film stating, "I had to plan every hockey move shown in the movie, including the penalty stroke that SRK missed. That shot alone took us nearly 20 hours as I was keen that it should be very realistic. I took the help of a lot of my former teammates. But more importantly, it was so easy working with SRK. He is unbelievably modest and was willing to do as many re-takes as we wanted."

== Jhalak Dikhlaa Jaa ==
Mir Ranjan Negi entered the second season of the show (it is the Indian version of Dancing with the stars and BBC's Strictly come dancing) with the choreographer Marischa Fernandes. He reached the semifinals against the TV actors Sandhya Mridul, Prachee Desai and Jai Bhanushali. Mr Negi as he was affectionately referred to by the judges surprised everybody by his dedication despite being the oldest contestant. He also worked on an album (Maya Ku Mundaru) by the Garhratana Mr. Narendra Singh Negi. The song is "Harshu Mama". He is also working in a movie "Chakachak Mumbai".

== Filmography ==
He played a small role as an officer in the Garhwali film Suberau Ghaam.
