= The Heart of the Game =

- Poster
- Directed by: Ward Serrill
- Written by: Ward Serrill
- Produced by: Ward Serrill
- Starring: Bill Resler; Darnellia Russell; Joyce Walker; Ludacris
- Distributed by: Miramax Films
- Release dates: June 11, 2005 (Seattle International Film Festival); June 9, 2006 (United States)
- Running time: 97 minutes
- Country: United States
- Language: English
- Budget: $11,300

The Heart of the Game is a 2005 sports documentary film about the Roosevelt Roughriders girls basketball team directed by Ward Serrill. The movie is centered on their star player Darnellia Russell and the Roughriders new coach Bill Resler. The film is narrated by Ludacris.

== Plot ==
The film begins two years before African-American Darnellia Russell attends the predominantly white and upper-class Roosevelt High School. Bill Resler, a tax law professor at the University of Washington, becomes their new girls basketball coach. Resler, a coach who uses animal and nature themes to motivate his team, believes they can win the Washington State championship but they fall short in the first game of the state tournament.

A couple of years later, Russell attends Roosevelt High School where she makes the junior-varsity team. Learning of her natural talent, Resler recruits her for the varsity squad. In the following years, the talented Roosevelt team falls short of winning the state championship in close games. Russell receives letters of interest from several major universities. However, after her junior year, she becomes pregnant by her longtime boyfriend and drops out of school.

After giving birth to a daughter, Russell returns to Roosevelt for her fifth year. However, the WIAA (Washington Interscholastic Activities Association) bans her from playing basketball due to a rule that states that high school students can only play on their teams for four years, unless a hardship is involved. Russell, believing that having an unplanned child constitutes a hardship, appeals the decision. Attorney Ken Luce, located in Tacoma, Washington, represents her in court and a judge rules in Russell's favor. The WIAA takes the matter to court again, and for the second time the judge grants Russell the right to continue playing. However, the WIAA files a lawsuit against Russell and Roosevelt High School. In defiance of the WIAA, the Roughriders continue to play with Russell on the team.

Russell and her team return to the Washington State high school basketball championship tournament and play rivals, the Garfield Bulldogs in the finals. She leads the team to the school's first state championship. Two days later, the WIAA dropped their case. Russell graduates from high school with honors and is named the Northwest Player of the Year.

Although Russell didn't receive any college scholarships, she attended North Seattle Community College.

== After the movie ==
On November 10, 2007, Roosevelt fired Resler as head coach. Roosevelt said that they wanted to go in a "different direction."

On July 8, 2008, it was announced that Darnellia Russell had committed to attend Lakehead University in Thunder Bay, Ontario, Canada for the 2008-09 season. Lakehead is a member of the OUA (Ontario Universities Athletic) Conference and the CIS (Canadian Interuniversity Sport).

However, soon after Russell began going to Lakehead, their Women’s Basketball Head Coach Jon Kreiner announced that she had decided to return home to Seattle and not play for the Thunderwolves.

Kreiner said Russell wanted to return home as she found being separated from her two daughters was much more difficult than she had anticipated.

Russell said it was not an easy decision. He said:

“I am really sorry for letting everyone down. I knew it was going to be very difficult leaving my kids but this was way more difficult than I can put into words. I want to thank everyone who worked so hard to get me to Thunder Bay; the Lakehead University Athletics Department, coaching staff, players, friends in Seattle, my Seattle coach and all the media who have been so kind to me. This was a tremendous opportunity for me and my decision to leave had nothing to do with the coaching staff or players. I miss my kids and need to be with them.”

Coach Kreiner said he was disappointed but was sympathetic to Russell’s choice. “Darnellia’s decision to go back home is an understandable one but also a disappointing one. I had hoped that she would take a little more time to give it more of a chance but we are very happy to have provided her the best opportunity and situation we could for her to achieve her degree while playing at Lakehead University. Darnellia has brought great international media attention to our program and I am honoured that she decided to play for us.”

Lakehead Athletics Director Tom Warden said he understood Russell’s decision. “I understand about commitment to family and we’re very sorry it didn’t work out for her here at Lakehead. We wish her the best of luck in the future.”

Mackenzie Argens, one of the freshmen Resler inserted during the state championship game, received a basketball scholarship to the University of Washington. A torn ACL sidelined her for the 2007-2008 season but she was granted a medical redshirt. She started 6 games as a redshirt freshman during the 2008-2009 season and averaged 4.1 points per game.

In 2012, Darnellia Russell became an assistant coach for Shoreline Community College in North Shoreline, Wash. She became head coach early in 2014 and served through the 2016-17 season.

Bill Resler died in Seattle on Feb. 4, 2017, of meningitis at the age of 71.

== Making of the film ==
Director Ward Serrill followed the Roosevelt Roughriders girls' basketball team for six seasons as he captured their story on film. Shortly thereafter, with help from Flying Spot, Inc. and others, The Heart of the Game was created and met with critical acclaim.

== Reception ==
On review aggregator website Rotten Tomatoes, the film holds an approval rating of 87% based on 98 reviews, with an average rating of 7.7/10. The website's consensus reads: "This group of high school girls and their eccentric basketball coach easily win your heart with their unusual humanity and dynamism."

== Awards ==
- 2007 Billie Award in Entertainment

== See also ==
- List of basketball films
