= Roger Nair =

Canadian producer and director

Roger Nair is a producer, director, distributor and writer of Bollywood movies and Hollywood movies in Toronto, Canada who has been vice-chair of Ontario Creates since 2021. He has produced or distributed films such as Guru, Kabhi Bhi Kahin Bhi, Supari.

== Biography ==
Roger Nair worked as an intern on the sets of Hollywood films in Vancouver, and it was there that he most probably developed an interest for film making as a profession. Later, he set up a film production support company in Toronto and Vancouver in 1995 and then gradually moved from line production to a full production House by 2001.

Supari (2003) was Nair's first film under his own banner. Kabhi bhi Kahin bhi followed and then a launch of Distribution Company: Lionheart distribution with the distribution and world premiere of the film GURU in Toronto.The mayor of Toronto David Miller and Minister of immigration for Canada Jason Kenney attended the event which saw Aishwarya Rai, Abhishek Bachchan, A.R. Rahman, Mani Ratnam, Madhavan Ranganathan walk the carpet for this film. This is where Aishwarya Rai and Abhishek Bachchan got engaged when Abhishek Bachchan proposed to Aishwarya at the premiere of this film that was held at Elgin theatre for the launch of Lionheart Distribution.

A descendant of Dewan Mokham Chand, Nair is a Human Rights Activist and is the chairman of South Asians of Human Rights Association (SAHRA).

Nair is the Vice chair of Ontario Creates (Ontario Media Development Corporation). since being appointed by the Government of Ontario in October 2021. Ontario Creates is an agency of the provincial government whose mandate is to be a catalyst for economic development, investment and collaboration in Ontario’s creative industries including the music, book, magazine, film, television and interactive digital media sectors, both domestically and internationally. Prior to that Nair was the executive member of the Toronto Film Board from 2011 to 2019 The board provided advice to the Mayor and City Council on matters of concern and gives voice to Toronto's interests on local, provincial and national issues.
