= Billie Awards =

American award for positive portrayals of female athletes in visual media

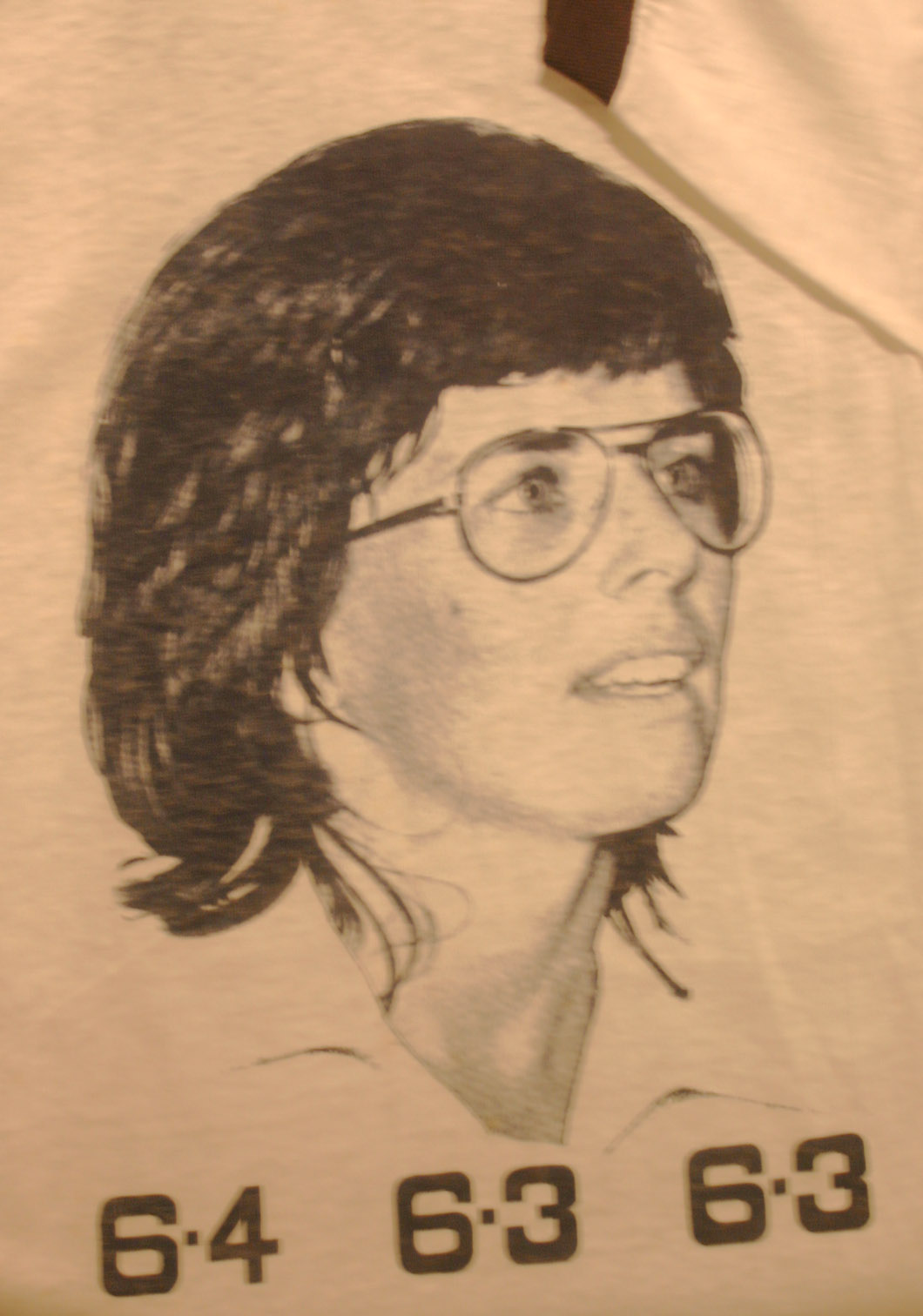
- Billie Jean King
- Location: Los Angeles
- Country: United States
- Presented by: Women's Sports Foundation
- Website: Official Site

The Billie Awards was an American awards ceremony that focused on positive portrayals of female athletes in visual media. It was held in Los Angeles, California by Billie Jean King's The Women's Sports Foundation from 2006 to 2009.

== Awards ==
=== 2009 Billie Awards ===
Winners

1. Breakthrough and Innovation: “Here I Am” – Nike, Advertising Campaign
2. Industry Leader: Dick Ebersol
3. Journalism: Mighty Macs – ESPN SportsCenter, Produced by Drew Gallagher; Sync or Swim – Produced by Cheryl Furjanic and Amanda Keropian; The Great Swim – Walker & Company, by Gavin Mortimer

=== 2008 Billie Awards ===
Nominations for the third annual Billie Awards included Women in American Horse Racing and Generation IX in the Entertainment category.

Winners

1. Entertainment: Chak De! India
2. Journalism: Marathon Woman: Running the Race to Revolutionize Women's Sports
3. Breakthrough and Innovation: Boom Boom Tap
4. Outstanding Journalist: Lesley Visser

=== 2007 Billie Awards ===
Nominations for the second annual Billie Awards included Watermarks (film) and Billie Jean King: Portrait of a Pioneer in the Entertainment category.

Winners

1. Entertainment: The Heart of the Game
2. Journalism: Lady Caliphs by ESPN
3. Breakthrough and Innovation: MADE, MTV Networks
4. Industry Leader: Ross Greenberg

=== 2006 Billie Awards ===
Nominations for the first annual Billie Awards included Bend It Like Beckham and Million Dollar Baby in the Entertainment category.

Winners

1. Entertainment: Dare to Dream: The Story of the U.S. Women's Soccer Team
2. Journalism: Christine Brennan - USA Today
3. Breakthrough and Innovation: Game Face: What Does a Female Athlete Look Like?
4. Industry Leader: Bud Greenspan – Cappy Productions
