= Chak De! India (song) =

- Screenshot from the music video of "Chak De! India" picturized Kabir Khan (Shah Rukh Khan) running and practicing with the Indian women's hockey team.

Song by Sukhwinder Singh, Salim Merchant, Marianne D'Cruz

from the album Chak De! India Soundtrack
- Language: Hindi; English
- Released: 2007
- Recorded: India
- Genre: Film score, Filmi
- Length: 4:43
- Composer: Salim–Sulaiman
- Lyricist: Jaideep Sahni
- Producer: Yash Raj Productions

Chak De! India (transl. "Go for it! India!") or (transl. "Let's go! India") is the title song of the soundtrack for the 2007 Hindi sports film Chak De! India. It is sung by Sukhwinder Singh, Salim Merchant, Marianne D'Cruz and was composed by the duo Salim–Sulaiman and lyrics penned by Jaideep Sahni.

Chak De! India has doubled as a sports anthem and is played in numerous sports events. In 2025 when the Indian women's national cricket team won the 2025 Women's Cricket World Cup, the win was juxtaposed to both Shah Rukh Khan’s portrayal of the coach, as well as to the film Chak De India itself in media outlets and social media. According to Salim Merchant, the song "almost became the sports anthem of the country, especially after India won the Cricket World Cup 2011." After India's World Cup victory, Indian team player Virat Kohli "sang 'Chak de India' to the crowd". When India defeated South Africa at the 2015 Cricket World Cup, Nitin Srivastava of the BBC noted: "MCG has erupted with "Vande Mataram" (the national song of India) and "Chak De India" (Go India!) slogans in the air".

== Awards ==
NDTV Poll

- Won: Best Song (Chak De! India)
