= Screen Award for Best Film =

Annual film award in India

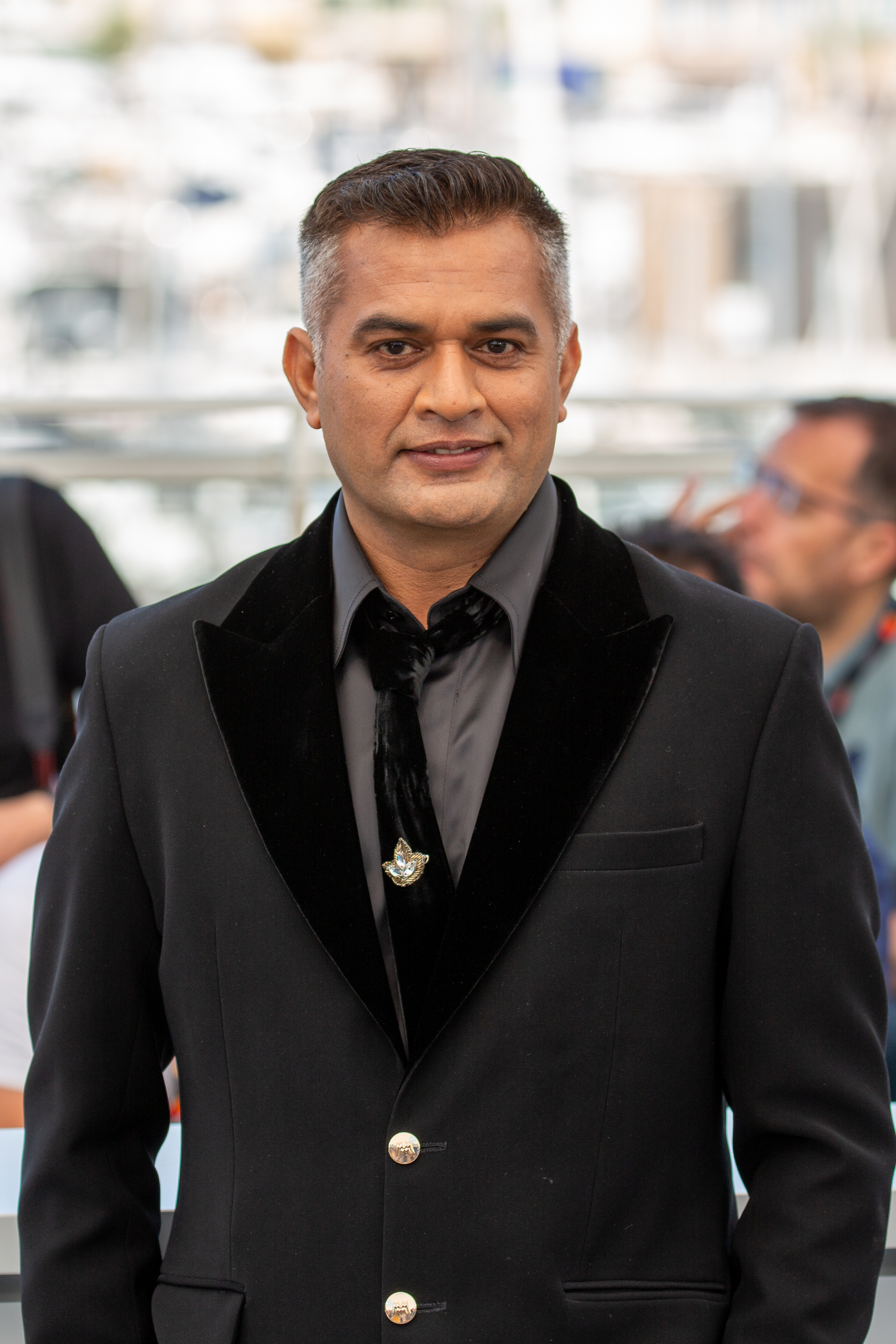
- Neeraj Ghaywan, director of Homebound
- Awarded for: Best Film
- Country: India
- Presented by: Screen India
- First award: Hum Aapke Hain Kaun...! (1995)
- Currently held by: Homebound (2026)

The Screen Award for Best Film is chosen by a distinguished panel of judges from the Indian "Bollywood" film industry and the winners are announced in January. Frequent winners include Ashutosh Gowariker (3 times) and Yash Chopra, Sanjay Leela Bhansali and Rakesh Roshan who have won 2 times each.

== Multiple wins ==
Wins	Recipient
3	Ashutosh Gowariker
2	Rakesh Roshan, Sanjay Leela Bhansali, Yash Chopra

== Winners ==
Year	Film	Producer
1995	Hum Aapke Hain Koun...!	Sooraj Barjatya
1996	Dilwale Dulhania Le Jayenge	Yash Chopra
1997	Raja Hindustani	Dharmesh Darshan
1998	Border	J. P. Dutta
1999	Kuch Kuch Hota Hai	Karan Johar
2000	Hum Dil De Chuke Sanam	Sanjay Leela Bhansali
2001	Kaho Naa... Pyaar Hai	Rakesh Roshan
2002	Lagaan	Ashutosh Gowariker
2003	Devdas	Bharat Shah
2004	Koi... Mil Gaya	Rakesh Roshan
2005	Swades	Ashutosh Gowariker
2006	Black	Sanjay Leela Bhansali
2007	Lage Raho Munna Bhai	Vidhu Vinod Chopra
2008	Chak De! India	Yash Chopra
2009	Jodhaa Akbar	Ashutosh Gowariker
2010	3 Idiots	Vidhu Vinod Chopra
2011	Udaan	Anurag Kashyap
2012	The Dirty Picture	Ekta Kapoor
2012	Zindagi Na Milegi Dobara	Farhan Akhtar
2013	Paan Singh Tomar	Ronnie Screwvala
2014	Bhaag Milkha Bhaag	Rakeysh Omprakash Mehra
2015	Queen	Vikas Bahl
2016	Talvar	Vishal Bhardwaj
2017	Pink	Pawan Kumar & Rashmi Sharma
2018	Dangal	Aamir Khan Productions
2019	Stree	Dinesh Vijan & Raj Nidimoru and Krishna D.K.
2020	Gully Boy	Excel Entertainment
2026	Homebound	Dharma Productions

== See also ==
- Bollywood
- Cinema of India
- Screen Awards
