= Screen Award for Best Background Music =

Annual film award in India

The Star Screen Award Best Background Music is chosen by a panel of distinguished judges.

Here is a list of the award winners and the films for which they won.

Year	Winner	Film
2018	Prince Rehman	Ek Galti
2015	Julius Packiam	Mardaani
2014	Shankar–Ehsaan–Loy	Bhaag Milkha Bhaag
2013	Ranjit Barot	Shaitan
2012	Pritam	Barfi!
2011	Wayne Sharpe	Raajneeti
2010	Amit Trivedi	Dev D
2009	A. R. Rahman	Jodhaa Akbar
2008	A. R. Rahman	Guru
2007	A. R. Rahman	Rang De Basanti
2006	Monty Sharma	Black
2005	Salim–Sulaiman	Dhoom
2004	Salim–Sulaiman	Bhoot
2003	Sandeep Chowta	Company
2002	Ranjit Barot	Aks
2001	Ilaiyaraaja	Hey Ram
2000	Naresh Sharma	Dil Kya Kare
1999	-	-

== See also ==
- Screen Awards
- Bollywood
- Cinema of India
