= Chitrashi Rawat =

Indian actress (born 1989)

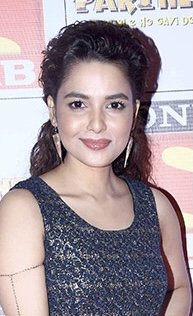
- Rawat in 2017
- Born: 29 November 1989 (age 36); Dehradun, Uttarakhand, India
- Occupations: Hockey player; actress
- Years active: 2007-present

Chitrashi Rawat (born 29 November 1989) is an Indian model, national level athlete and actress known for her role of Komal Chautala in Chak De! India in 2007. Chitrashi is a real life hockey player. She started playing hockey at the age of 17. She played as a left striker.

== Career ==
Rawat was born 29 November 1989. Rawat had been playing field hockey since childhood.

She was picked for the role of a hockey player in the movie Chak De! India by the producers after an audition in Jabalpur. The film turned out to be a blockbuster worldwide, and Rawat shot to fame. In 2008, she starred in her second venture, Fashion. The film was a success at the box office, and received critical acclaim. She had a main role in the 2009 action film Luck opposite superstars Sanjay Dutt, Imran Khan, Shruti Haasan, Mithun Chakraborty, and Ravi Kishan. Luck did average business at the box office.

Her latest films include Yeh Dooriyan and the 2012 hit Tere Naal Love Ho Gaya.

Rawat is a former student of the Guru Nanak Academy. The daughter of T. S. Rawat, a resident of Raipur, Uttarakhand, Rawat regularly represents the Uttarakhand hockey team in the national championships. Currently, she is studying at St Andrew FYBMM pursuing her bachelor's degree in mass media. She has campaigned for Minute Maid pulpy orange juice, along with co-stars Vidya Malvade and Sagarika Ghatge.

She hails from Dehradun. She is also hosting Star Gold's Sabse Favourite Kaun. She was also a contestant in a Comedy Circus 2 of Optimystix. She acted in Madhur Bhandarkar's Fashion as Shomu and recently as "Shortkut" in the 2009 action thriller movie Luck. She subsequently participated in Iss Jungle Se Mujhe Bachao, the Indian remake of I'm a Celebrity...Get Me Out of Here!

In 2020, Rawat acted in Rubaru, a short film directed by Tisca Chopra.

== Filmography ==
=== Movies ===
| Year | Film | Role | Notes | Ref. |
|---|---|---|---|---|
| 2007 | Chak De! India | Komal Chautala | | |
| 2008 | Fashion | Shomu | | |
| 2009 | Luck | Shortcut | | |
| 2011 | Yeh Dooriyan | Nikki | | |
| 2012 | Tere Naal Love Ho Gaya | Dhani | | |
| 2012 | Prem Mayee | Shrishti | | |
| 2015 | Black Home | Mirchi | | |
| 2015 | Hogaya Dimaagh Ka Dahi | Saara | | |
| 2021 | Urf Ghanta | Lollypop | | |
| TBA | Monsoon Football | | | |

=== Television ===
| Show | Role | Ref. |
|---|---|---|
| Sabse Favorite Kaun | Host | |
| Iss Jungle Se Mujhe Bachao | | |
| F.I.R. | Inspector Jwalamukhi Chautala | |
| Comedy Circus 2 | | |
| Tu Mera Hero | Rajnigandha | |
| Shankar Jaikishan 3 in 1 | Simple Kapoor | |

== Awards ==
| Year | Awards | Categories | Ref. |
|---|---|---|---|
| 2008 | Star Screen Award | Best Actress In A Supporting Role | |
