= Guru (2007 film) =

2007 Indian film by Mani Ratnam

- Theatrical release poster
- Directed by: Mani Ratnam
- Screenplay by: Mani Ratnam
- Dialogues by: Vijay Krishna Acharya; Azhagam Perumal (Tamil)
- Inspired by: Dhirubhai Ambani
- Produced by: Mani Ratnam; G. Srinivasan
- Starring: Abhishek Bachchan; Aishwarya Rai; Mithun Chakraborty; R. Madhavan; Vidya Balan
- Cinematography: Rajiv Menon
- Edited by: A. Sreekar Prasad
- Music by: A. R. Rahman
- Production company: Madras Talkies
- Distributed by: Madras Talkies Adlabs
- Release date: 12 January 2007
- Running time: 162 minutes
- Country: India
- Language: Hindi
- Budget: ₹22 crore
- Box office: ₹83.67 crore

Guru (transl. Teacher) is a 2007 Indian Hindi-language drama film directed by Mani Ratnam. Produced by Madras Talkies, the film stars Abhishek Bachchan, Aishwarya Rai, Mithun Chakraborty, R. Madhavan, and Vidya Balan. The score and soundtrack for the film were composed by A. R. Rahman. The film was rumoured to be a biopic of the industrial tycoon Dhirubhai Ambani, but Ratnam refuted the claims, clarifying it was a work of fiction.

The film was released on 12 January 2007 with its première at the Elgin Theatre in Toronto, Canada, on Thursday, 11 January 2007 by Roger Nair, making it the first Indian film to have a mainstream international première in Canada. Roger Nair Productions acquired the rights for Canada and held a premiere with most of the cast and crew flown to Toronto, Canada. The film was premiered in the Tous Les Cinemas du Monde (World Cinema) section of 2007 Cannes Film Festival. The film had also been dubbed and released in Tamil with the same title while in Telugu with the title Gurukanth.

== Plot ==
In 1951, in the village of Idar, Gujarat, ambitious young man Gurukant "Guru" Desai dreams of financial success despite his pragmatic father Kantilal, the village school headmaster. Determined to make his fortune, Guru travels to Turkey, enters the spice trade and later joins Burmah Shell. Offered a major promotion, he declines and returns to India to establish his own business.

Guru pitches a venture to his childhood friend Jignesh and, needing capital, marries Jignesh's older sister, Sujata, primarily for her substantial dowry. They move to Bombay, where Guru and Jignesh establish a textile trading business. Guru's aggressive expansion leads to the creation of Shakti Corporation, but ideological differences cause Jignesh to dissolve their partnership. Jignesh reveals that Guru initially married Sujata for financial gain, straining their marriage; nevertheless, Sujata remains loyal, and the couple develop a genuine, unbreakable bond.

During Guru's early years in Bombay, he is mentored by Manik "Nanaji" Dasgupta, the idealistic publisher of the whistleblower newspaper The Independent. Nanaji regards Guru as a son, while Guru becomes close to Nanaji's granddaughter, Meenu, who is later diagnosed with multiple sclerosis. As Shakti Corporation grows into one of India's largest conglomerates, Guru ruthlessly expands his empire. To circumvent the restrictive "License Raj", he smuggles machinery parts for his polyester mills, falsifies production capacities, bribes officials and manipulates the stock market to increase profits.

When Nanaji discovers that Guru's success is rooted in systemic corruption, his journalistic principles compel him to act. He assigns analytical reporter Shyam Saxena to expose Guru's illegal practices through a sustained press campaign. Amid the ensuing media and legal battle, Sujata gives birth to twin daughters, Disha and Drishti. The pressure causes Guru to suffer a severe stroke, permanently paralysing his right side, while Meenu, who has married Shyam, dies from her illness, devastating both sides.

In October 1980, a disabled but defiant Guru appears before a special government inquiry tribunal to answer 29 regulatory and financial fraud charges against Shakti Corporation. During cross-examination, he argues that he arrived in Bombay as an uneducated villager, unfamiliar with complex excise, customs and sales-tax laws, and that an archaic, corrupt and restrictive bureaucracy left him little choice but to use bribes and legal loopholes to survive and expand.

The tribunal acknowledges flaws in the system and clears Guru of 27 charges, fining him ₹6.3 million for the remaining two regulatory offences and allowing him to resume executive duties. He later addresses Shakti Corporation's shareholders in a packed stadium, reflecting on his father's warning and declaring that their shared ambition has created India's largest company. He ends by urging them to expand the corporate empire globally.

== Cast ==
- Abhishek Bachchan as Gurukant "Guru" Desai (based on Dhirubhai Ambani)
- Aishwarya Rai as Sujata "Suju" Desai (based on Kokilaben Ambani)
- Mithun Chakraborty as "Nanaji" Manik Dasgupta (based on Ramnath Goenka and Pannalal Dasgupta)
- R. Madhavan as Shyam Saxena (based on Swaminathan Gurumurthy)
- Vidya Balan as Meenakshi "Meenu" Saxena (née Dasgupta)
- Roshan Seth as Justice Thapar
- Mallika Sherawat in a guest appearance as Champa, the dancer in song "Mayya Mayya"
- Arya Babbar as Jignesh (based on Champaklal Damani)
- Arjan Bajwa as Arzan Contractor
- Rajendra Gupta as Guru's father Kantilal Desai
- Sarita Joshi as Guru's stepmother
- Sachin Khedekar as Sujata's father
- Sudhir Pandey as Mathura Das
- Neena Kulkarni as Tulsiben, Sujata's mother
- Prathap K. Pothan as K. R. Menon I.A.S.
- Darshan Jariwala as cashier Anand Palekar
- Sanjay Mishra as Chhagan, Guru's senior in Turkey
- Manoj Joshi as Ghanshyam Das
- Dhritiman Chatterjee as Contractor (based on Naval Tata)
- Sanjay Swaraj as Guru's brother
- Anaushka Dantra and Ashoi Dantra as Disha Desai and Drishti Desai, Guru's twin daughters
- Sunil Agarwal as Ashok Agarwal
- Murad Ali
- Raviprakash as Bhanu Patel (in voice)
- Sunny Subramanian as Young Guru
- Mukesh S Bhatt as Ramlal
- T. M. Karthik as Doctor (uncredited)

== Production ==
Guru was written and directed by Mani Ratnam, while Vijay Krishna Acharya wrote the Hindi dialogues. Filming took place in Mumbai, Madurai, Turkey, Badami and Melkote (both in Karnataka), as well as in Chennai, Pollachi, Chettinad region Tamil Nadu, and Athirappilly in Kerala. Much of the film was shot on the Express Estates, the former home of newspaper publications The Indian Express and Dinamani. The music is composed by A. R. Rahman, with lyrics by Gulzar. Cinematography for the film is handled by Rajiv Menon. Several scenes were deleted from the final theatrical version, including a scene in which Sujata first gives birth to a stillborn child and a scene in which Guru becomes angry with his wife for visiting Manik Dasgupta.

Guru is reflective of a man's desire for ambition and success, and how times have changed from the period immediately following India's independence to the present. It was widely speculated that this film is a biographical film of Dhirubhai Ambani, one of India's biggest industrial tycoons. Like Guru, Ambani also had roots in Gujarat as the son of a schoolteacher, went abroad to work for the gas company Shell, and returned to India to import polyester. Ratnam has described Guru as inspired by stories both past and present.

== Soundtrack ==
The soundtrack for this film is composed by A. R. Rahman. For his work in this film, A. R. Rahman received awards for Best Music Director and Best Background Score at the 53rd Filmfare Awards as well as the 9th IIFA awards. According to the Indian trade website Box Office India, with around 11,50,000 units sold, this film's soundtrack album was the year's twelfth highest-selling.

== Reception ==
=== Box office ===
Guru opened well upon release, gaining momentum over time. In the United States, Guru, opening on a limited release, registered good collections in its opening weekend, fetching ₹3 crore during this period, with a high screen average. By its seventh week, the film had netted ₹41.65 crore in India, collecting ₹13 crore in the US and the UK. As of 23 February 2007, Guru, having released 12 January, has grossed more than ₹83.67 crore across the world and was declared a "hit" at the box office. In the United States, it was a blockbuster.

=== Critical reception ===
Guru received positive reviews from critics, with widespread praise for Abhishek Bachchan's performance. On the review aggregator website Rotten Tomatoes, 85% of 13 critics' reviews are positive, with an average rating of 7.1/10. Metacritic, which uses a weighted average, assigned the film a score of 70 out of 100, based on 5 critics, indicating "generally favorable" reviews.

Taran Adarsh of Bollywood Hungama gave 4/5 stars and wrote "Guru ranks as one of Mani Ratnam's finest efforts and one of the best to come out of Hindi cinema," and praised actors performances writing "Reserve all the awards for Bachchan. No two opinions on that! His performance in Guru is world class and without doubt. From a sharp teenager in Turkey to the biggest entrepreneur of the country, Bachchan handles the various shades his character demands with adroitness." The New York Times gave 3/4 stars and wrote "You might think it would be difficult to fashion an entertaining account of the life of a polyester manufacturer, even a fictitious one. But director Mani Ratnam has done so with Guru, an epic paean to can-do spirit and Mumbai capitalism." Rajeev Masand of CNN-IBN gave 4/5 stars explaining "The beauty of Mani Ratnam's cinema is truly in its unpredictability. Few filmmakers can translate their personal vision onto screen the way Mani Ratnam can. So that's two thumbs up for Guru – it's a must-watch for all. Of the film's cast, Chakraborty playing the ruthless newspaper baron, deserves mention for the dignity which he brings to the part, one that's clearly inspired by Indian Express founder Ramnath Goenka. The actor in this film who truly blew my mind, is Rai. There is a silent grace, quiet nobility to her performance, which I have to admit I've never seen before. Of course, the film belongs to Bachchan, the protagonist, Guru himself. And in all honesty, Bachchan rises to the challenge like never before." Los Angeles Weekly termed it as the best Hindi film since Lagaan (2001). Richard Corliss of Time compared the film to Frank Capra's It's a Wonderful Life and said that one of the main highlights of the film was its climax. This Guru is more like a fine polyester. He further noted, "Ash's film eminence remains a mystery. No question she's pretty, but she's more an actress-model than a model-actress. In Guru, she's mainly ornamentation". Hindustan Times gave 3.5/5 stars and wrote "Ratnam and Bachchan Jr have given you a film that’s as close to life as say, business is to politics. For the discerning viewer, satisfaction is guaranteed. and some more. Rai is marvellous, handling complex scenes with grace and empathy. Above all, the enterprise belongs to Bachchan. He is astonishingly nuanced and unwaveringly forceful in his career-best performance after Yuva (2004)."

Raja Sen of Rediff gave 3/5 stars and wrote "Guru is fuelled by a slew of strong performances. Bachchan owns the movie, forcing audiences to sit up straight as it begins and making us laugh and applaud as he carries on. He's impressive in every frame, as he ebulliently takes over an alien room by hopping onto a chair, or when he's trying to be ever so slightly slimy, polishing his spectacles and showing off his smarminess". Daily News and Analysis gave 3/5 stars and wrote "Guru is a film that enthralls you for most of its running time as it traces the life of the uncannily forward seeing bumpkin from Gujarat who turns every disadvantage into an advantage. With Guru, Bachchan has finally learnt the nuances of the grammar of cinema, in what will very likely be his defining film". Sify gave the verdict "Very Good" and write "Mani Ratnam’s Guru is undoubtedly a gutsy and outstanding film. Outstanding performance is extracted from everyone in the cast." The Hindu wrote "Guru is vintage Mani Ratnam. It encapsulates his characteristic canniness about human nature, specifically relationships. This is considered Abhishek Bachchan's role of a lifetime." The Sunday Times wrote "It is certainly one of the best Bollywood movies you will see. Performances attract admiration: Bachchan does a De Niro, piling on the dosas to show the ageing and overweight Guru and he is, surprisingly, impressive. Rai sheds her usual doe-eyed expressions and is endearing as the supportive but fiery wife, who looks and dances like an angel. Chakraborty and Tamil superstar Madhavan shine equally brightly in underwritten supporting roles". Jaspreet Pandohar of BBC gave 3/5 and wrote "Ratnam's absorbing screenplay ensures that Guru rises above the usual rags to riches story, by weaving in meaty subplots involving the protagonist's complex relationships with his loyal wife (Rai), friends and foes".

== See also ==
- List of Bollywood films of 2007
