= Chak De! India =

2007 Indian film by Shimit Amin

- Theatrical release poster
- Directed by: Shimit Amin
- Written by: Jaideep Sahni
- Produced by: Aditya Chopra
- Starring: Shah Rukh Khan
- Cinematography: Sudeep Chatterjee
- Edited by: Amitabh Shukla
- Music by: Salim–Sulaiman
- Production company: Yash Raj Films
- Distributed by: Yash Raj Films
- Release date: 10 August 2007
- Running time: 149 minutes
- Country: India
- Languages: Hindi; English
- Budget: ₹20 crore
- Box office: ₹109 crore

Chak De! India (transl. Let's go! India) is a 2007 Indian sports drama film directed by Shimit Amin, written by Jaideep Sahni and produced by Aditya Chopra under the banner of Yash Raj Films. The film stars Shah Rukh Khan as Kabir Khan, the former captain of the India men's national field hockey team. After a disastrous loss to Pakistan, Khan is ostracised from the sport owing to religious prejudice. 7 years later in an attempt to redeem himself, he becomes the coach of the India women's national field hockey team, with the goal of turning its 16 contentious players into an award-winning team.

Sahni was inspired by the women's national field hockey team's win at the 2002 Commonwealth Games to develop Chak De! India's script after reading about it in a newspaper. The screenplay was fictional and the characters, while inspired by the real team and coaches, were invented by Sahni. Kabir Khan's struggles bore resemblance to those faced by real-life hockey player Mir Ranjan Negi, although Sahni was unaware of Negi's tribulations while writing the script. On the suggestion of Maharaj Krishan Kaushik, then coach of the women's hockey team, Sahni invited Negi to join the film's production team. A combination of professional players and actors were cast as the sixteen team members; workshops were conducted for training the actors in hockey and the players in acting. Kaushik and Negi would train Sahni, Khan and the other cast members over a period of six months. The sports scenes were choreographed by Rob Miller, and the soundtrack was composed by Salim–Sulaiman, with lyrics written by Sahni.

Chak De! India was released worldwide on 10 August 2007, coinciding with the country's 60th Independence Day, and grossed ₹109 crore (US$26.36 million) on a ₹20 crore (US$4.84 million) budget, thus becoming the third-highest grossing Hindi film of 2007. It received widespread critical acclaim upon release, with praise for its direction, story, screenplay, dialogues, feminist themes, and performances of the cast, with high praise directed towards Khan's performance. A recipient of numerous accolades, Chak De! India won the National Film Award for Best Popular Film Providing Wholesome Entertainment at the 55th National Film Awards. It received a leading 10 nominations at the 53rd Filmfare Awards, including Best Film, Best Director (Amin) and Best Supporting Actress (Shukla), and won a leading 5 awards, including Best Film (Critics) and Best Actor (Khan).

The title track song "Chak De! India," now doubles as a sports anthem in India.

== Plot ==
During the final minutes of a Hockey World Cup match in Delhi, India trails Pakistan 1–0. Indian team captain Kabir Khan misses a crucial penalty stroke, costing India the match. Soon after, the media circulates a photograph of Khan shaking hands with the Pakistani captain. The sporting gesture is severely misinterpreted as an act of sympathy towards Pakistan, and rampant religious prejudice forces a disgraced Khan and his mother to flee their ancestral home in exile.

Seven years later, Uttam Singh, a field hockey advocate, convinces the sceptical head of the Indian hockey association, Mr. Tripathi, to appoint Khan as the head coach of the neglected Indian women's national field hockey team. Khan takes charge of a fractured roster of 16 young women plagued by regional biases and interpersonal rivalries. Komal Chautala from Haryana continuously clashes with Preeti Sabarwal from Chandigarh; the short-tempered Balbir Kaur from Punjab bullies teammates Rani Dispotta and Soimoi Kerketa from rural Jharkhand; and Northeast Indian players Mary Ralte and Molly Zimik face systemic racial discrimination. Furthermore, team captain Vidya Sharma struggles with domestic pressure from her husband's family to abandon the sport, while Preeti's fiancé, national cricket vice-captain Abhimanyu Singh, routinely belittles her hockey career.

Khan realises that tactical skill is useless without team unity. He enforces strict discipline, benching veteran player Bindiya Naik for refusing to cooperate. In retaliation, Bindiya manipulates the team into rebelling against Khan's authority, prompting his resignation. However, during a farewell lunch at a restaurant, a group of local men sexually harass Mary. Balbir retaliates, triggering a massive brawl where the entire team unites to fight off the harassers. Recognising that the women have finally acted as a cohesive unit, Khan prevents the restaurant staff from intervening. Impressed by his underlying intentions, the players apologise and request Khan to remain their coach.

The team faces a major hurdle when Tripathi refuses to fund their trip to the World Cup in Australia. Khan challenges the men's national team to an exhibition match. Although the women narrowly lose, their fierce performance convinces the association to sponsor their trip. In Australia, Bindiya's lingering resentment over being passed up for the captaincy results in an opening 7–0 loss to the hosts. When Khan confronts her, Bindiya attempts to seduce him to compromise his authority. Khan flatly rejects her advances and orders her to stay away from the active line-up.

Khan adapts his training regimen, steering the team through successive victories over England, Spain, South Africa, New Zealand, and Argentina. Before a critical semi-final match against South Korea, Khan swallows his pride and asks Bindiya to return to the field, relying on her veteran experience to break the Korean team's rigorous "man-to-man" marking strategy. Bindiya delivers, and alongside teammate Gunjan Lakhani, secures India a spot in the finals against Australia.

In the final, Khan implores rivals Komal and Preeti to put aside their personal goal-scoring ambitions for the sake of the collective unit. Trailing 2–1 in the dying minutes of the game, Komal makes a selfless pass to Preeti, who scores the equaliser and pushes the match into a penalty shootout. Despite falling behind 2–0 early in the shootout, the Indian team mounts a spectacular comeback to win 3–2, claiming the World Cup against all odds. The historic victory alters public perception, forcing the players' families to treat them with newfound respect. His patriotism fully vindicated and his honour restored, Khan returns with his mother to his ancestral home, welcomed back by the very community that had cast him out.

== Cast ==
Shortly after the film's release, the media began referring to the 16 actresses who portrayed the players as the "Chak De! Girls". The panel of judges at the Screen Awards also used the term, awarding the Best Supporting Actress award to the "Chak De! Girls" at the 14th Screen Awards in 2008.

=== Team ===
Actor	Character	State or city	Position and number
Shah Rukh Khan	Kabir Khan	India	Head coach
Vidya Malvade	Vidya Sharma	Madhya Pradesh	Captain and goalie (18)
Shilpa Shukla	Bindiya Naik	Maharashtra	Centre half (5)
Nichola Sequeira	Nichola Sequeira	Maharashtra	Utility player (12)
Sagarika Ghatge	Preeti Sabarwal	Chandigarh	Centre forward (9)
Chitrashi Rawat	Komal Chautala	Haryana	Right in (8)
Tanya Abrol	Balbir Kaur	Punjab	Fullback (3)
Shubhi Mehta	Gunjan Lakhani	Andhra Pradesh	Right half (4)
Sandia Furtado	Nethra Reddy	Andhra Pradesh	Left out (11)
Anaitha Nair	Aliya Bose	West Bengal	Right out (7)
Arya Menon	Gul Iqbal	Uttar Pradesh	Left in (10)
Kimi Laldawla	Mary Ralte	Mizoram	Penalty Specialist (15)
Masochon Zimik	Molly Zimik	Manipur	Left half (6)
Kimberly Miranda	Rachna Prasad	Bihar	Utility player (14)
Seema Azmi	Rani Dispotta	Jharkhand	Right defender (2)
Nisha Nair	Soimoi Kerketa	Jharkhand	Substitute (17)
Raynia Mascerhanas	Raynia Fernandes	Goa	Utility player (16)

=== Supporting cast ===
- Aanjjan Srivastav as Mr. Vishal Tripathi, Head Indian Hockey Official
- Vibha Chibber as Krishnaji, assistant coach for the Indian women's field hockey team
- Javed Khan as Sukhlal
- Mohit Chauhan as Uttam Singh, Kabir's former hockey teammate and friend
- Vivan Bhatena as Abhimanyu Singh, Vice captain of the Indian national cricket team and Preeti's fiancé
- Nakul Vaid as Rakesh Sharma, Vidya's husband
- Joyshree Arora as Kabir's mother
- Ramakant Dayama as Association Member
- Rio Kapadia as Commentator

== Production ==
=== Development ===
A brief article about the victorious women's team at the 2002 Commonwealth Games inspired screenwriter Jaideep Sahni to create a film about the Indian women's hockey team, and he modelled Kabir Khan on hockey coach Maharaj Krishan Kaushik. After listening to the storyline Kaushik suggested that Sahani meet hockey player Mir Ranjan Negi, who faced accusations of throwing the match against Pakistan in the 1982 Asian Games. Shah Rukh Khan stated in a speech delivered at the University of Edinburgh that the phrase Chak De! was originally "an inspirational martial cry that Sikh soldiers used while lifting logs in order to make bridges across rivers on their campaigns against their enemies. It implies the will to get up and get on with it."

According to Sahni, he was unaware of Negi's plight while he wrote the script and any resemblance to Negi's life was coincidental. Negi agreed, saying that he did not "want to hog the limelight. This movie is not a documentary of Mir Ranjan Negi's life. It is in fact the story of a team that becomes a winning lot from a bunch of hopeless girls". Responding to media reports equating Kabir Khan with Negi, Sahni said: "Our script was written a year and a half back. It is very unfortunate that something, which is about women athletes, has just started becoming about Negi."

=== Casting ===
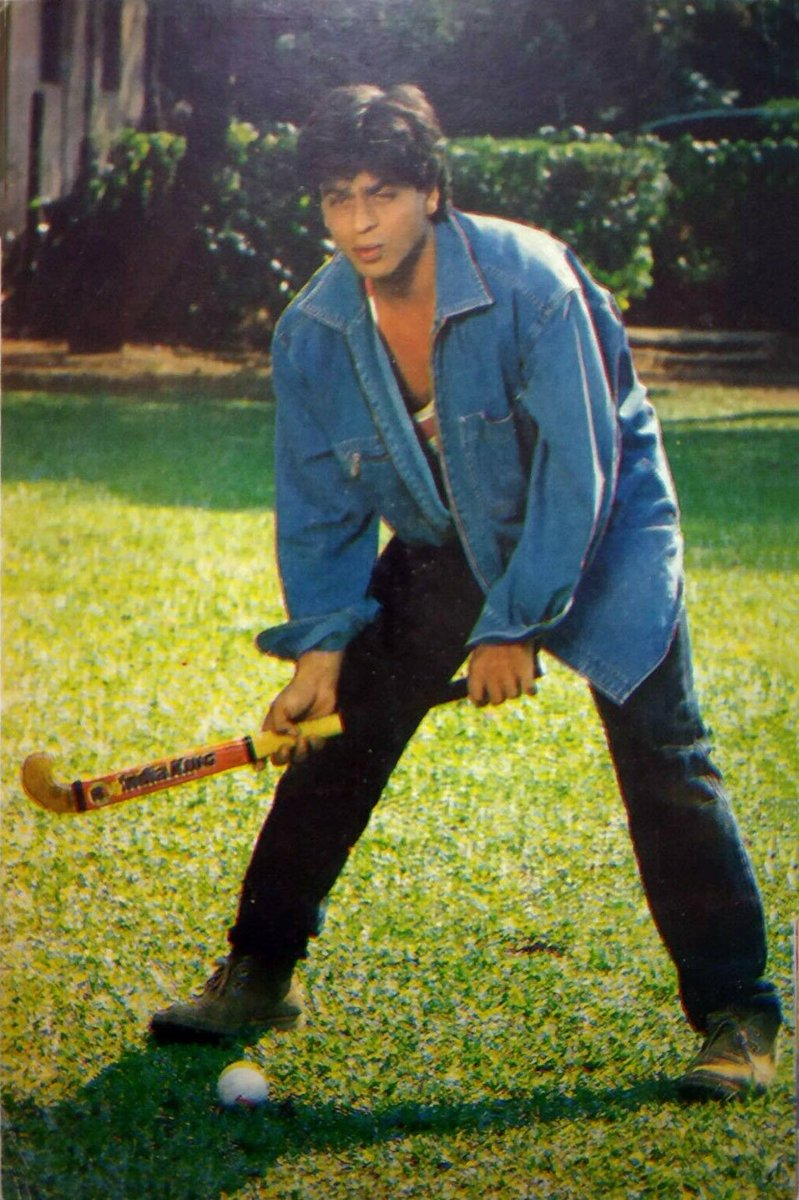
Shah Rukh Khan took this role partially because he used to play hockey in college. Khan said "The role was a lot like going back to my past". His performance gained his critical acclaim for this role.

"I felt why has the girls’ team been given so little coverage. I shared the idea with Aditya (Chopra). He liked it and said stop everything else and concentrate on it. I started my research by spending time with hockey players ... It’s just a matter of chance that Negi's story matches with Kabir Khan. There are many cases, like in Colombia, football players are killed for not performing well for the club. I had no idea about Negi’s story while writing the script, and he joined us after the script was ready. In fact, his name was suggested by M.K. Kaushik, who was the coach of the team that won the Commonwealth Games’ gold. On day one, when Negi read the script, he cried and it was then that we came to know about his story."

— Jaideep Sahni

Although Salman Khan was initially considered for the lead role, he ultimately declined because the film "was not my genre at that point in time...it was a more serious kind of film and I was doing more of a commercial kind of cinema." Shah Rukh Khan (who had originally declined due to a scheduling conflict with Karan Johar's Kabhi Alvida Naa Kehna and Farhan Akhtar's Don) was later confirmed as Kabir Khan. Khan accepted the role partly because he used to play hockey in college. Some media sources called the actor's role offbeat, since it departed from his usual romantic image and included neither lip synched songs nor a single female lead.

Casting of the 16 actresses as the hockey players took over six months. Amin described the process as "very, very difficult" and "very strenuous because the requirement was they had to play – and act". A four-month training camp was held where the girls learned the rules of the game, took acting lessons and followed a strict diet; safety precautions were also taken. According to Amin, it was "tricky" to teach the actors how to play hockey, and those who were hired because they were hockey players, had to learn how to act. Some of the actors, such as Chitrashi, Sandia, and Raynia, were cast because they were hockey players.

Rob Miller was the sport action director, choreographing the sports scenes, and worked with Negi to train the actors. About working with Khan, Negi recalled that everything was planned "including the penalty stroke that SRK missed. That shot alone took us nearly 20 hours as I was keen that it should be very realistic."

== Soundtrack ==
The soundtrack album of Chak De! India and the film's background music is composed by Salim–Sulaiman. This film marks the duo's first collaboration with actor Shah Rukh Khan. The lyrics for all the songs were written by Jaideep Sahni. The album features seven tracks with a remix song and a dialogue by Shah Rukh Khan from this film. The album was released on 11 July 2007, and upon its release 11,00,000 units of the album were sold, making it the eleventh highest selling soundtrack album of the year, according to the Indian trade website Box Office India. The title track song "Chak De! India," now doubles as a sports anthem in India.

== Release ==
Chak De! India premiered on 13 August 2007 at Somerset House in London to an audience of over 2,000 during the Film4 Summer Screen and India Now festivals. It was released globally in theatres on 10 August 2007, playing on only 400 screens in India because of the middling response of Yash Raj Films's two previous films, Ta Ra Rum Pum and Jhoom Barabar Jhoom.

The film was screened in New Delhi on 17 August 2016, as part of the week-long Independence Day Film Festival. The festival was jointly presented by the Indian Directorate of Film Festivals and Ministry of Defense, commemorating India's 70th Independence Day.

=== Critical response ===
On the review aggregator website Rotten Tomatoes, 89% of 19 critics' reviews are positive, with an average rating of 6.90/10. Metacritic, which uses a weighted average, assigned the film a score of 68 out of 100, based on 4 critics, indicating "generally favorable" reviews.

In an NPR interview via affiliate WBUR-FM, Mumbai Mirror columnist Aseem Chhabra called Chak De! India "an example of a film that's been made within the framework of Bollywood and yet it is a very different film. It does take up some realistic issues, and what I really liked about the film was that the women who acted, you know, who are part of the team, each one of them got a chance. Their personality, their characters, were very well-written, and so, the superstar in the film was Shahrukh Khan, who was the coach of the team; he doesn't sort of take over the whole film. Every supporting character gets a role, and it's a very inspiring movie that really changed the mood in India. People loved it". Nikhat Kazmi of The Times of India gave the film four out of five stars stating that it was a film of "great performances by a bunch of unknowns." India Today called Chak De! India "the most feisty girl power movie to have come out of Bollywood ever." Sudhish Kamath of The Hindu wrote, "At another level, Chak De is about women's liberation. It is one of the best feminist films of our times." Rajeev Masand of CNN-IBN gave the film four out of five stars, saying "Chak De's ... a winner all the way." Shubhra Gupta of The Indian Express called the film "the most authentic, meticulously researched sports movie India has made". In Kolkata's Telegraph, Bharathi S. Pradhan wrote that the film combines "an extremely well-knit screenplay with unrelentingly deft direction, 16 unknown, and not even glamorous, girls simply carried you with them, with one single known actor compelling you to watch Chak De India without blinking". Jaspreet Pandohar of the BBC gave Chak De! India four out of five stars stating that "while the tale of the sporting underdog is hardly new, Jaideep Sahni's screenplay offers a rare look at a popular Indian sport often overshadowed by cricket." Andy Webster of The New York Times wrote that the film gave a fresh look to the conventional underdog sports film, comparing its premise to the US victory in the 1991 FIFA Women's World Cup. Derek Elley of Variety called Chak De! India "a patriotic heartwarmer that scores some old-fashioned entertainment goals." In The Hollywood Reporter, Kirk Honeycutt wrote that the "technical credits are first rate with excellent cinematography, quicksilver editing, musical montages of practice and a fine use of locations."

Michael Dequina of themoviereport.com was more critical of the film, giving it 2.5 out of four stars and calling it "a very familiar, very formula underdog sports movie with nothing to distinguish it from similar, equally slick Hollywood product." Maitland McDonagh of TV Guide gave Chak De! India two stars out of four, writing that the film uses "sports-movie conventions to address larger cultural and political issues, and while it doesn't miss a cliche, it also invests every one with vigorous conviction." Although Subhash K. Jha gave the film 3.5 stars, calling it "a fairly predictable story" with dialogue "quite often the stuff bumper stickers are made of", he wrote that "Chak De! India is an outright winner" and "one of the finest sports-based dramas in living memory." Khalid Mohamed gave the film 3.5 stars in the Hindustan Times stating that the film "may be predictable but compels you to root for a team of losers whom only an earth-angel can save from disastrous defeat".

Apart from critics, Chak De! India tied with Taare Zameen Par for the Best Film of 2007 according to various Bollywood movie directors such as Madhur Bhandarkar, David Dhawan, Rakeysh Omprakash Mehra, Anurag Basu, and Sriram Raghavan.

=== Box office ===
Due to the film's strong critical response, cinema halls reported 80% occupancy for its opening weekend. Chak De! India topped the Indian box office during its first two weeks, and played to full houses during its first two months. The film was particularly successful in large cities. Chak De! India was the third-highest-grossing film of 2007 in India, with domestic net earnings of ₹66,54,00,000 that year it was declared a box office 'Blockbuster'. By the end of its theatrical run, the film grossed ₹102 crore ($27.05 million) worldwide, including ₹85.86 crore gross (₹66.54 crore net) in India and $3.94 million (₹15.76 crore) overseas.

=== Accolades ===
Chak De! India won Best Popular Film Providing Wholesome Entertainment at the 55th National Film Awards ceremony. At the 53rd Filmfare Awards, it received twelve nominations and won five, including those for Critics Best Film, Best Actor, Best Action, Best Cinematography and Best Editing. Among other wins, the film got fourteen nominations and won nine awards at 9th IIFA Awards, at the Producers Guild Film Awards, it received fourteen nominations and won eight awards, at the Screen Awards, it received twelve nominations and won six awards at the Stardust Awards, it received seven nominations and won three awards, at the V. Shantaram Awards, it won five awards and at Zee Cine Awards, it received seven nominations and won six awards.

== Legacy ==
Shubhra Gupta includes Chak De India in his book 50 Films That Changed Bollywood, 1995–2015. In 2024, August Man ranked Chak De India as #1 (out of 11) in a list of Hindi sports films, noting that it "was ahead of its time with its subtle exploration of women’s empowerment while ticking off all the boxes of a pure sports movie with the right amount of Bollywood spice." The next year in 2025, The Hollywood Reporter India ranked Chak De India as one of India's 25 best movies of the 21st century, noting that Chak De! India "stands as a landmark in Indian film history, not because it had a superstar or a dramatic climax-but because it dared to imagine a different India." Time Out also ranked it #35 on its list of the "100 Best Bollywood Movies."

The title track Chak De! India from the film's soundtrack has doubled as a sports anthem and is played in numerous sports events. In 2025 when the Indian women's national cricket team won the 2025 Women's Cricket World Cup, the win was juxtaposed to both Shah Rukh Khan’s portrayal of the coach, as well as to the film Chak De India itself in media outlets and social media. According to Salim Merchant, the song "almost became the sports anthem of the country, especially after India won the Cricket World Cup 2011." After India's World Cup victory, Indian team player Virat Kohli "sang 'Chak de India' to the crowd". When India defeated South Africa at the 2015 Cricket World Cup, Nitin Srivastava of the BBC noted: "MCG has erupted with "Vande Mataram" (the national song of India) and "Chak De India" (Go India!) slogans in the air."

== See also ==
- List of sports films
- The Romantics (TV series) (2023)
