= Jaideep Sahni =

Indian screenwriter, songwriter and creative producer

- Born: New Delhi, India
- Occupations: screenwriter; lyricist
- Years active: 2000-present

Jaideep Sahni is an Indian screenwriter and lyricist who is known for his work in Hindi films. He has written screenplays for films such as Bunty Aur Babli (2005), Chak De! India (2007), Rocket Singh: Salesman of the Year (2009) and Shuddh Desi Romance (2013).

He won the Filmfare Award for Best Dialogue and Filmfare Award for Best Story for Company (2002), and the Filmfare Award for Best Screenplay for Khosla Ka Ghosla (2006). He also won the IIFA Award for Best Story, for Chak De! India .

== Early life and education ==
Sahni was born and brought up in New Delhi, India. He studied at the Guru Nanak Dev Engineering College, Bidar. He started working as a computer engineer, and has worked for NIIT.

== Career ==
He became a lyricist after jam sessions with Palash Sen, and after discovering the screenplay for the film Gandhi in a New Delhi bookshop, he started writing screenplays, at age 27. He wrote both the screenplay and the lyrics for Jungle (2000), which was directed by Ram Gopal Verma. The second film written by Sahni and directed by Verma, Company (2002), was nominated for eleven Filmfare Awards and won seven of them. Sahni then worked with Dibakar Banerjee in Khosla Ka Ghosla. Since then he continues to work for Yash Raj Films, where he started as a screenwriter for the film Bunty Aur Babli directed by Shaad Ali which was a box office success and a major breakthrough in Abhishek Bachchan's career.

He then wrote the 2007 film Chak De! India, directed by Shimit Amin, who was also an assistant to Ram Gopal Varma before joining Yashraj films. The movie starred Shah Rukh Khan as the coach of Indian hockey team, and was loosely based on the real-life story of Maharaj Krishan Kaushik. He also wrote the screenplay for Aaja Nachle, which was directed by Anil Mehta and which was also released in 2007. Rocket Singh: Salesman of the Year, the third film of Shimit Amin, was released in 2009.

== Filmography ==
Screenwriter

- Jungle (2000)
- Company (2002)
- Bunty Aur Babli (2005)
- Khosla Ka Ghosla (2006)
- Chak De! India (2007)
- Aaja Nachle (2007)
- Rocket Singh: Salesman of the Year (2009)
- Shuddh Desi Romance (2013)

Lyricist

- Jungle (2000)
- Naach (2004)
- Bluffmaster! (2005)
- Salaam Namaste (2005)
- Ek Ajnabee (2005) - 1 song
- Chak De! India (2007)
- Aaja Nachle (2007)
- Johnny Gaddaar (2007)
- Roadside Romeo (2008)
- Rab Ne Bana Di Jodi (2008)
- Dil Bole Hadippa! (2009)
- Tere Bin Laden (2010)
- Dum Maaro Dum (2011)
- Shuddh Desi Romance (2013)
- Befikre (2016)
- Hichki (2018)
- Andhadhun (2018)
- 83 (2021)
- Jayeshbhai Jordaar (2022)
