= Chinmayi discography =

Indian playback singer

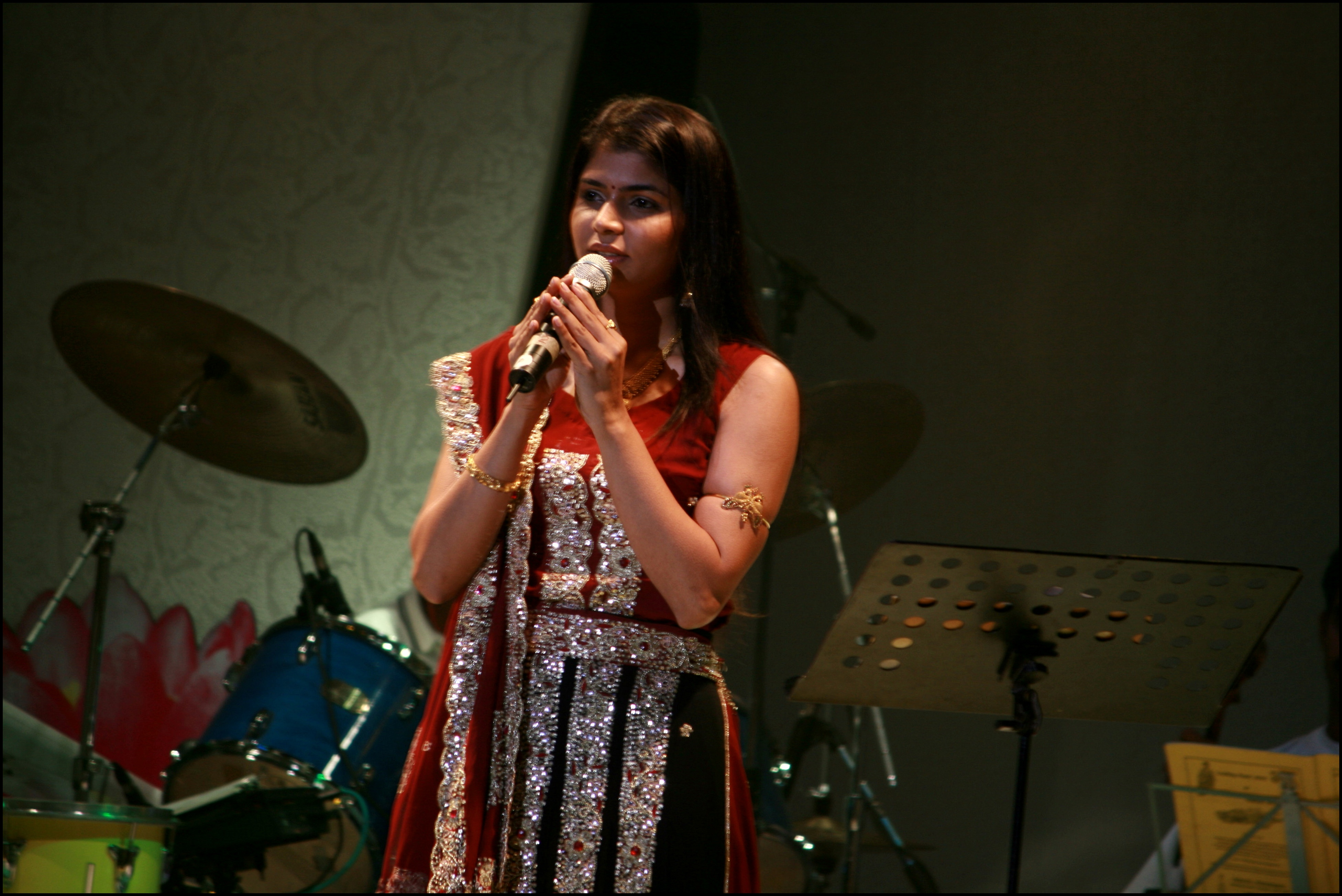
Chinmayi in 2008

Chinmayi is an Indian playback singer, working mainly for the South Indian film industry. She has produced songs since 2002 and done work in Tamil, Telugu, Hindi, Malayalam, Kannada, Marathi, Gujarati, Konkani. She has also produced various jingles for advertisements and television. She has sung over 2000+ songs in 10 different languages.

== List of Tamil songs ==
Year	Film title	Song title	Composer(s)	Co-singer(s)
2002	Kannathil Muthamittal	"Kannathil Muthamittal" (Version I)	A. R. Rahman	P. Jayachandran
2002	Kannathil Muthamittal	"Kannathil Muthamittal" (Version II)	A. R. Rahman	P. Jayachandran
2002	Five Star	"Five Star"	Parasuram Radha	Anuradha Sriram, Shubha Mudgal, Timmy
2003	Enakku 20 Unakku 18	Oru Nanban Irundhal	A. R. Rahman	S. P. B. Charan, Venkat Prabhu
2003	Enakku 20 Unakku 18	Sandhippoma	A. R. Rahman	Unni Menon, Anupama
2003	Nala Damayanthi	Enna Ithu	Ramesh Vinayakam	
2003	Boys	Please Sir	A. R. Rahman	Kunal Ganjawala, Clinton Cerejo, S. P. B. Charan
2003	Boys	Ayyappo	A. R. Rahman	Shankar Mahadevan
2003	Vaseegara	Oru Thadavai Solvaya	S. A. Rajkumar	Hariharan
2003	Kangalal Kaidhu Sei	Ennuyir Thozhi	A. R. Rahman	Unni Menon
2003	Whistle	Kirukka Kadhal Kirukka	D. Imman	Srinivas
2003	Sena	Uyir Pirinthalum	D. Imman	Prathap Chandran, Rozan
2003	Thithikudhe	Mainave Mainave (Reprise)	Vidyasagar	Harini
2003	Anbe Un Vasam	Thirumugam Therinthathu	Dhina	Solo
2003	Kadhal Kirukkan	Poovae Mudhal Poovae	Deva	Solo
2003	Eera Nilam	Poothene	Sirpy	Solo
2003	Soori	Pirivellam	Deva	Harish Raghavendra
2003	Shiva 9848022338	"Etho Ennai"	Chakri	
2004	Pudhukottaiyilirundhu Saravanan	Pudhu Kadhal	Yuvan Shankar Raja	Ranjith
2004	Vishwa Thulasi	Engu Piranthathu	Ilayaraja	Tippu
2004	Chellame	Kadhalikkum Aasai	Harris Jayaraj	KK, Timmy, Mahathi
2004	Thathi Thavadhu Manasu	"Poo Poo Poonkuruvi"	Deva	S. P. Balasubrahmanyam
2004	Idhayame	Kaloori	Pradeep Ravi	Tippu
2004	New	If You Wanna	A. R. Rahman	Anupama, Aparna
2004	Oru Murai Sollividu	Eppadi Solvadhu	Bharadwaj	Unni Krishnan
2004	Kadhal Sarigama	Thanniril Meen Ondru	Dhina	Solo
2004	Giri	Oppanakkara Veedhiyile	D. Imman	Karthik
2004	Jananam	Neethane Emmele	Bharadwaj	Harish Raghavendra
2004	Senthalam Poove	"Senthalam Poove"	Vimal Raj	
2004	Sema Ragalai	"Holy Holy"	Simmam Kumar	P. Jayachandran
2004	Sema Ragalai	"Thulluvatho Ilamai"	Simmam Kumar	Tippu
2004	Kuthu	Ennai Theendi Vittal	Srikanth Deva	Prasanna Rao
2005	Kadhal FM	"Mugama Manama"	Aravind - Shankar	
2005	Kannadi Pookal	"Chinna Chinna"(Female)	S. A. Rajkumar	
2005	Kicha Vayasu 16	"Solla Mudiyala"	Dhina	Hariharan
2005	Jore	Bad Boya	Deva	Prasanna Rao
2005	Karka Kasadara	Noothana	Prayog	Harish Raghavendra
2006	Veyil	Kaadhal Neruppin	G. V. Prakash Kumar	Karthik
2006	Oru Kalluriyin Kadhai	Kadhal Embathu	Yuvan Shankar Raja	Harish Raghavendra
2006	Pachchak Kuthira	Sarasa Logha	Sabesh–Murali	Karthik, Suchitra, Pop Shalini, Vindhya
2006	Kalabha Kadhalan	Thogai Virithoru	Niru	Solo
2006	Nee Venunda Chellam	Kannanai Ninaikamal	Dhina	Solo
2006	Amirtham	Nenje Nenje	Bhavatharini	Karthik
2006	Amirtham	Kadhale Ennai	Bhavatharini	Srinivas
2006	Arinthum Ariyamalum	Sil Sil	Yuvan Shankar Raja	Sathyan
2006	Kedi	Antha Vannam Pola	Yuvan Shankar Raja	Karthik
2006	Kedi	Kunguma Poove	Yuvan Shankar Raja	Ranjith
2007	Rameswaram	"Yedho Senja"	Niru	Ranjith
2007	Sivaji	"Sahana"	A. R. Rahman	Udit Narayan, A. R. Rahman
2007	Guru	"Aaruyire"	A. R. Rahman	A. R. Rahman, Murtuza Khan, Quadir Khan
2007	Guru	"Mayya Mayya"	A. R. Rahman	Maryem Tollar, Keerthi Sagathia
2007	Mirugam	"Oru Aattukutty Azhagaale	Sabesh–Murali	Solo
2007	Agra	"Shyam Milan"	C. S. Babu	Solo
2007	Nam Naadu	"Manasil Manasil"	Srikanth Deva	Karthik
2008	Bheema	Enadhuyire	Harris Jayaraj	Nikhil Mathew, Sadhana Sargam, Sowmya Raoh
2008	Sakkarakatti	Chinnamma	A. R. Rahman	Benny Dayal
2008	Sakkarakatti	I Miss You Da	A. R. Rahman	Solo
2008	Poo	Aavaram Poo	S. S. Kumaran	Solo
2008	Vallamai Tharayo	Aayiram Vaanavil	Bharadwaj	Solo
2008	Pachai Niramae	Vayasu Sonnatha	Sriram	Solo
2008	Thangam	Pattukkara Vaetti	Srikanth Deva	Solo
2008	Nenjathai Killadhe	Oru Manasuls Iru Manam	Premji Amaran	Haricharan
2008	Aayutham Seivom	Innum Oru	Srikanth Deva	Krish
2008	Inbaa	Yaaro Yaaro	P. B. Balaji	Karthik
2008	Thenavattu	Pattam Poochi	Srikanth Deva	Krish
2008	Thozha	Adiye En Annakkili	Premji Amaran	Vijay Yesudas
2008	Satrumun Kidaitha Thagaval	Konjam	Bala	Harish Raghavendra
2008	Kannum Kannum	Ennaiyum Unnaiyum	Dhina	Karthik
2008	Thotta	Mugam Poo	Srikanth Deva	Naresh Iyer
2008	Vedha	Azhage Azhage	Srikanth Deva	KK
2009	Sirithal Rasipen	"Chekka Chekka Sevathavele"	Iniyavan	Prasanna
2009	Aadhavan	Vaarayo Vaarayo	Harris Jayaraj	Unni Krishnan, Megha
2009	Pokkisham	Nila Nee Vaanam	Sabesh–Murali	Vijay Yesudas
2009	Ayan	Oyaayiye Yaayiye	Harris Jayaraj	Benny Dayal, Haricharan
2009	Vennila Kabadi Kuzhu	Lesa Parakkudhu	V. Selvaganesh	Karthik
2009	Moonar	Konjam Poo Konjam Then (Duet)	Ravi Deventhiran	Karthik
2009	Moonar	Konjam Poo Konjam Then	Ravi Deventhiran	Solo
2009	Madurai Sambavam	Kulathil Mudhal	Johan	Hariharan
2009	Pudhiya Payanam	Vaanavilley Unai Varaindhathu	Prasad Ganesh	Solo
2009	Anthony Yaar	Maniyosai Kekalaye	Dhina	Sabesh–Murali
2009	Maamaram	Kadhal Rowdy	Nandhan Raj	Solo
2010	Naane Ennul Illai	"Medhuvaga Medhuvaga"	Amresh Ganesh	Karthik
2010	Neeyum Naanum	"Azhagana Enn Azhagana"	Sriram Vijay	
2010	Thunichal	"Paiyaa Paiyaa"	Premgi Amaren	Vijay Yesudas
2010	Vinnaithaandi Varuvaaya	Anbil Avan	A. R. Rahman	Devan Ekambaram
2010	Enthiran	Kilimanjaro	A. R. Rahman	Javed Ali
2010	Villalan	Naan Naanalla	Ravi Ragav	Karthik
2010	Siddhu +2	Poove Poove	Dharan	Yuvan Shankar Raja
2010	Nellu	Kodiyodu Thamarai Poo	S. S. Kumaran	Kaushik
2010	Kadhalar Kudiyiruppu	Uyirodu Uyiril	James Vasanthan	Solo
2010	Viruthagiri	Devathai Ondru	Sundar C. Babu	Hariharan
2010	Vandae Maatharam	Vandae Maatharam	D. Imman	D Imman, Vijay Yesudas, Krish, Benny Dayal, Haricharan, Harish Raghavendra, Mathangi, Pop Shalini, Srilekha Parthasarathy, Suchithra, Karthik
2010	Vamsam	Marudhaani Poovumele	Taj Noor	MK Balaji
2010	Virundhali	Kokha Kokha Kozhi	S. S. Kumaran	Vinitha
2010	Sivappu Mazhai	Kadhal Thaandi	Deva	Hariharan
2010	Jaggubhai	Apple Laptop	Rafee	Shankar Mahadevan
2010	Naanum En Kadhalum	Poo Ondru Mothi	Mariya Manogar	Karthik
2011	Margazhi 16	"Karakkan Murakkan"	E K Bobby	Shankar Mahadevan
2011	Om Shakthi	"Mayakkaathey Machinaa"	Mani Sharma	
2011	Vaagai Sooda Vaa	Sara Sara	M. Ghibran	Solo
2011	Engaeyum Eppothum	Sotta Sotta	C. Sathya	C. Sathya
2011	Vazhividu Kannae Vazhividu	Mazhai Varum Pozhuthil	Aathish Uththiriyan	Unni Krishnan
2011	Mahaan Kanakku	Vizhigal Podhum	Rishal Sai	Solo
2011	Neeye En Kadhali	Iravinil Undhan	Prem Kumar	Solo
2011	Poraali	Engirunthu	Sundar C Babu	Solo
2011	Poraali	Yaar Ivan (Female)	Sundar C Babu	Solo
2011	Vithagan	Kadalirandu Thuliyirandaai	Joshua Sridhar	Solo
2011	Ra.One	En Uyir	Vishal–Shekhar	Solo
2011	Sri Rama Rajyam	"Jagadananda Karaka"	Ilaiyaraaja	S. P. Balasubrahmanyam
2011	Sri Rama Rajyam	"Sree Rama Vaarai"	Ilaiyaraaja	Sakyath
2011	Sri Rama Rajyam	"Seetha Seemandham"	Ilaiyaraaja	Solo
2011	Sri Rama Rajyam	"Devargal Thithikka"	Ilaiyaraaja	K. S. Chithra
2011	Sri Rama Rajyam	"Ramayaname Sree"	Ilaiyaraaja	K. S. Chithra
2011	Sri Rama Rajyam	"Rama Rama"	Ilaiyaraaja	Shweta Mohan, Anitha Karthikeyan
2011	Sri Rama Rajyam	"Mangalame Ramanukku"	Ilaiyaraaja	Anitha Karthikeyan
2011	Ko	Amali Thumali	Harris Jayaraj	Hariharan, Swetha Mohan
2011	Ra Ra	Mayakiputtalae	Srikanth Deva	Naresh Iyer
2011	Aayiram Vilakku	Radhiye	Srikanth Deva	Harish Raghavendra
2011	Mudhal Idam	Aiythaanay	D. Imman	
2011	Karungali	Boomi Thaduthalum	Srikanth Deva	Solo
2011	Karungali	Mansurunkiyathe	Srikanth Deva	Solo
2011	Theneer Viduthi	Ennavo Pannuthu	S. S. Kumaran	
2011	Kanden	Yavarukkum Thalaivan	Vijay Ebenezer	Sendhil Dass
2011	Maithanam	Kanava Nesama	Sabesh–Murali	Solo
2011	Engeyum Kadhal	Nenjil Nenjil	Harris Jayaraj	Harish Raghavendra
2011	Kullanari Koottam	Vizhigalile	V. Selvaganesh	Karthik
2011	Muthukku Muthaga	Enna Panni Tholache	Kavi Priya Thambi	Vijay Yesudas
2011	Aadu Puli	Annakili Okkarum	Sundar C Babu	Karthik
2011	Aadu Puli	Annakkili Okkarum (Humming)	Sundar C Babu	Karthik
2011	Thoonga Nagaram	Koorana Parvaigal	Sundar C Babu	Hariharan
2011	Vaada Poda Nanbargal	Nammai Thandi	Siddharth	V. Prasanna, Aiswathu
2011	Ilaignan	Imaithoodhane	Vidyasagar	Solo
2012	Thiruthani	"Adi Vaanaville"	Perarasu	Unni Menon
2012	Ambuli	"Nenjukulla Yaaru"	Sam C. S.	Karthik
2012	Kandathum Kanathathum	"Oh Samurra Santhangal Podu"	Charlie VA	Solo
2012	Kondaan Koduthaan	"Thanjavur Gopuram"	Deva	S. P. Balasubrahmanyam
2012	Kondaan Koduthaan	"Pavadai Pattampuchiye"	Deva	Karthik
2012	Kondaan Koduthaan	"Paatha Pakkure"	Deva	Athithyaram
2012	Maalai Pozhudhin Mayakathilaey	"Nerathin Neramellam"	Achu	Narayan Nagendra Rao, Achu
2012	Manam Kothi Paravai	"Yenna Solla"	D. Imman	Vijay Prakash
2012	Medhai	"Nilavukku Piranthaval Evalo"	Dhina	Harish Raghavendra
2012	Naanga	"Idhazhil"	Bala Bharathi	Karthik
2012	Nanban	"Asku Laska"	Harris Jayaraj	Vijay Prakash, Suvi Suresh
2012	Neerparavai	"Para Para"(Sad)	N. R. Raghunanthan	Solo
2012	Ooh La La La	Oh Thozhiye	Shekar Chandra	Ranjith
2012	Oru Kal Oru Kannadi	Akila Akila	Harris Jayaraj	Aalap Raju, Sharmila
2012	Padam Paarthu Kathai Sol	Ival Yaaro	Ganesh Ragavendran	Harish Raghavendra
2012	Panivizhum Nilavu	Nenjae	L. V. Ganesh	Naresh Iyer
2012	Poorva Kudi	Pozhaikka Vandha	Bruce	Solo
2012	Poorva Kudi	Mazhai Thuli	Bruce	Haricharan
2012	Raattinam	Yele Yepulla	Manu Ramesan	Karthik
2012	Thadaiyara Thakka	Kalangal	S. Thaman	Javed Ali
2012	Thuppakki	Poi Varava	Harris Jayaraj	Karthik
2012	Sooriya Nagaram	Kichu Kichu	Ron Ethan Yohann	Solo
2012	Sooriya Nagaram	Unnai Pirivena	Ron Ethan Yohann	Karthik
2012	Vinayaga	Idhu Kadhal Varum Samayam	Sham Prasen	Unni Krishnan
2012	Ariyaan	Vizhiyaal	Vikram Varman	Solo
2012	Ariyaan	Nee Irukkum Naal Varaikkum	Vikram Varman	Karthik
2012	Mugamoodi	Mayaavi	K	Solo
2012	Eppadi Manasukkul Vanthai	Eppadi Manasukkul Vanthai	A. J. Daniel	Naresh Iyer
2012	Yugam	"Andru Oru Naalil"	Azhagar Ponraj	
2012	Meenkothi	"Chumma Chumma Pathu"	Dhina	
2012	Therodum Veethiyile	"Marandhu Viduu"	D. Imman	Sriram Parthasarathy
2012	Nandhanam (Unreleased film)	"Ithu Enna Valiyo" (Female)	Gopi Sunder	Haricharan
2013	Naveena Saraswathi Sabatham	Kaathirundhai Anbe	Prem Kumar	Abhay Jodhpurkar, Nivas
2013	Irandaam Ulagam	Iravinil Oruvanai	Anirudh Ravichander	Solo
2013	Maryan	Naetru Aval	A. R. Rahman	Vijay Prakash
2013	Kadal	Magudi Magudi	A. R. Rahman	Aaryan Dinesh Kanagaratnam, Tanvi Shah
2013	Ainthu Ainthu Ainthu	Vizhiyile Vizhiyile	Simon	Haricharan, Blaaze
2013	Ambikapathy	Kanaave Kanaave	A. R. Rahman	Madhushree, Vaishali, Pooja Vaidyanath, Sharanya Srinivas, Aanchal Sethi
2013	Annakodi	"Aavarangaatukulla"	G. V. Prakash Kumar	Sathya Prakash
2013	Sandhithathum Sindhithathum	"Uyire Uyirin"(Version l)	Sabesh–Murali	Haricharan
2013	Sandhithathum Sindhithathum	"Uyire Uyirin"(Version ll)	Sabesh–Murali	Haricharan
2013	Puthiya Thiruppangal	Oru Thuli Iru Thuli	Vidyasagar	Haricharan
2013	Kalyana Samayal Saadham	Mella Sirithai	Arrora	Haricharan
2013	Meyyazhagi	Empaera	SP Abhishek	S. P. B. Charan
2013	Meyyazhagi	Paranthu Pochu Manamae	SP Abhishek	Solo
2013	Anjal Thurai	Iravu Neram	Hitesh	Solo
2013	Unnodu Oru Naal	Swasathil	Sivapragasam	Solo
2013	Mye	Thada Thada Thada	Kannan	Harini
2013	Sonna Puriyathu	Kaaliyana Saalaiyil	Yatish Mahadev	S. P. B. Charan
2013	Maasani	Naan Paada	N. Fazil	Solo
2013	Settai	Poyum Poyum	S. Thaman	Haricharan
2013	Onbadhula Guru	Vidhavidhamaga	K	Vijay Prakash
2014	Amara	"Simmakallu"	D. Imman	Sirkazhi G. Sivachidambaram
2014	Kurai Ondrum Illai	"Kadhal Mazhyil"	Ramanujan MK	M. M. Manasi
2014	Marumunai	"Penne Penne"	Sathyadev	Silambarasan
2014	Mosakutty	"Vada Dai Enpurusa"	Ramesh Vinayakam	Ranjith
2014	Panivizhum Malarvanam	"Thoorathila Aagayam"	B R Rajin	Belly Raj
2014	Rettai Vaalu	"Kulu Kulungudhu"	V. Selvaganesh	
2014	Karthikeyan (D)	"Thandavee"	Shekar Chandra	
2014	Theriyama Unna Kadhalichitten	"Sapa Mapa Ma Pa"	P R Srinath	Naresh Iyer
2014	Vingyani	"Un Paarvai Arugil"	Maris Vijay	
2014	Vizhi Moodi Yosithaal	"July Kaatru"	B Athif	Deepak
2014	Nerungi Vaa Muthamidathe	Yaarum Paakkama	Madley Blues	Solo
2014	Thirunthuda Kadhal Thiruda	Oliyin	Ranjith Melppat	Karthik
2014	Yaan	Latcham Calorie	Harris Jayaraj	Arjun Menon
2014	Yaan	Nenje Nenje	Harris Jayaraj	Unni Krishnan, Pravin Saivi
2014	Ninaithathu Yaaro	Kairegai	X. Paulraj	Solo
2014	Enna Satham Indha Neram	Vizhiyal Pesum	Naga	Solo
2014	Mathapoo	Yaaridamum Solladha	Velayudham	Solo
2014	Adiyum Andamum	Mayam Seidhayo	L.V. Ganeshan	Solo
2014	Kochadaiiyaan	Idhayam	A. R. Rahman	Srinivas
2014	Kathai Thiraikathai Vasanam Iyakkam	Aagayam Koodava	C. Sathya	Solo
2014	Thirumanam Enum Nikkah	Enthaaraa Enthaaraa	M. Ghibran	Shadaab Faridi
2014	Aaha Kalyanam	Kadha Kadha	Dharan	Solo
2014	Eppodhum Vendran	Jesus Magalae	Srikanth Deva	Abhay Jodhpurkar
2014	Nalanum Nandhiniyum	Thoongama	Ashwath Naganathan	Balram
2014	Vilasam	Salai Oram Nindru	Ravi Ragav	Haricharan
2014	Nadhigal Nanaivathillai	Jillu Jillu	Soundharyan	Solo
2014	Kadhal Solla Aasai	Enna Mayam	S. Lekha	Solo
2014	Marumugam	Boom Boom	Agastya	Belliraj
2014	Kalai Vendhan	Nenjukkulle	Srikanth Deva	Karthik
2015	Dharani	"Malapola Unna Sumanthenae"	Yenson Bakyanathan	Vijay Yesudas
2015	Sagaptham	"Enakkanavan"	Karthik Raja	
2015	Sagaptham	"Karichan Kuruvi"	Karthik Raja	Karthik
2015	Thunai Mudhalvar	"Aiyoo Aiyoo"	Balaji Pradeep, Harish, Jai	Prasanna
2015	Thunai Mudhalvar	"Dhinam Dhinam"	Balaji Pradeep, Harish, Jai	Rohith
2015	144	Poove Pooviname	Sean Roldan	
2015	Rudhramadevi (D)	Anthapurathil	Ilayaraja	Sadhana Sargam, K. S. Chithra
2015	Thakka Thakka	Edhum Sollaamal	Jakes Bejoy	Haricharan
2015	Puli	Mannavanae Mannavanae	Devi Sri Prasad	Sooraj Santhosh, M. L. R. Karthikeyan, Anitha
2015	Massu Engira Masilamani	Naan Aval Illai	Yuvan Shankar Raja	Karthik
2015	Maya	Aayiram Aayiram	Ron Ethan Yohann	Solo
2015	Meymarandhen Paaraayo	Meymarandhen Paaraayo	Himesh Reshammiya	Solo
2015	Meymarandhen Paaraayo	Nerum Inmaiyaal	Himesh Reshammiya	Solo
2015	Meymarandhen Paaraayo	Santhaikku Vanthaayo	Himesh Reshammiya	Sathya Prakash
2015	Asurakulam	Yedharku Penne	C. Sathya	Santy Jude, N. S. Kamatchi
2015	Yennai Arindhaal...	Idhayathai Yedho Ondru	Harris Jayaraj	Solo
2015	Anegan	Roja Kadale	Harris Jayaraj	Shankar Mahadevan, Sunidhi Chauhan
2015	Isai	Isai Veesi	S. J. Surya	Solo
2015	Isai	Adho Vanile Nila	S. J. Surya	Karthik, S. J. Surya
2015	Mannar Valaikuda	"Enkaiyagal Poovagal"	Sivapragasam	Solo
2015	Mannar Valaikuda	"Penne En Seidhai"	Sivapragasam	
2015	I	Ennodu Nee Irundhaal (Reprise)	A. R. Rahman	Sid Sriram
2015	Viraivil Isai	Unnal Kanda	M. S. Ram	Vijay Prakash
2015	Arjunan Kadhali	Yedho Yedho Seithal	Srikanth Deva	Vijay Prakash
2015	Kadhal 2 Kalyanam	Ithu Kadhalai Irunthidumo	Yuvan Shankar Raja	Benny Dayal
2015	Thagadu Thagadu	Naan Naanaga Illai	Balamurali Balu	Haricharan
2015	Nambiar	Ithuvarai Yaarum	Vijay Antony	Rahul Nambiar
2015	Ivanum Panakkaran	Sharalalla	Srikanth Deva	
2015	Bagavan	Minnal Minnum	K. K. Bagavath Kumar	Karthik
2015	Karthikeyan	Thandava	Shekar Chandra	Solo
2015	Boologam	Tattoo Tattoo	Srikanth Deva	Vaishali, Abhay Jodhpurkar
2015	Avalukkenna Azhagiya Mugam	"October Eazhu"	David Showrrn	Rahul Nambiar
2015	Kadhal Panchayathu	"Ada Ennadi Senja"(Female)	E J Johson	
2015	Kadhal Panchayathu	"Orumurai Sirupilai"	E J Johson	
2016	Nayagi	"Ennaanadho Edhanadho"	Raghu Kunche	
2016	Chennai 600028 II: Second Innings	Nee Kidaithal	Yuvan Shankar Raja	Haricharan
2016	Thappu Thanda	Mughaye Ven Mughaye	Naren Balakumar	Abhay Jodhpurkar
2016	Thappu Thanda	Mughaye Ven Mughaye (Reprise)	Naren Balakumar	Solo
2016	Bongu	Vella Kuthira	Srikanth Deva	B. Jagadeesh
2016	Dharma Durai	Endha Pakkam	Yuvan Shankar Raja	Rahul Nambiar
2016	24	Naan Un	A. R. Rahman	Arijit Singh
2016	Puthiya Payanam	Nirvaathamay	Edwin S A	Shweta Mohan
2016	Virumandikkum Sivanandikkum	Kottuthu Kottuthu	R. Devarajan	Prasanna
2016	Veera Vamsam	Manmadha Manmadha	Kabileshwer	Solo
2016	Pattathari	Kannodu	S. S. Kumaran	Solo
2016	Adra Machan Visilu	Nenjil Yaaradhu	N. R. Raghunanthan	Naresh Iyer
2016	Jackson Durai	Yethetho	Siddharth Vipin	Karthik
2016	Nijama Nizhala	Noorukodi Pennil	Subu Siva	Gopal Rao
2016	Moondraam Ullaga Por	Vaanmazhai	Ved Shankar	
2016	Ennul Aayiram	Kaathu Kidantha	Gopi Sunder	Najim Arshad
2016	Ennul Aayiram	Uyiril	Gopi Sunder	Solo
2016	Ko 2	Kannamma	Leon James	Inno Genga
2016	Azhagu Kutti Chellam	Kadhal Oru Sathurangam	Ved Shankar	Abhay Jodhpurkar
2016	Kathiravanin Kodai Mazhai	Pattala Rasave	Sambasivam	Solo
2016	Uyire Uyire	"Oh Priya Priya"	Anup Rubens	Adnan Sami
2016	Uyire Uyire	"Azhage Azhage"	Anup Rubens	Raja Hasan
2017	Soorathengai	"Adavadi Ponnu Naan"	Mahesh Panjanathan	
2017	Brahma.com	Unnale Ellame Unnale	Siddharth Vipin	Shekhar Ravjiani
2017	Naan Aanaiyittal	Thenamma Thenamma	Anoop Rubens	Vijay Yesudas
2017	Yaakkai	Naan Ini Kaatril	Yuvan Shankar Raja	
2017	Rangoon	Thottil Madiyil	R. H. Vikram	
2017	Kaatru Veliyidai	Nallai Allai	A. R. Rahman	Sathya Prakash
2017	Kaalakkoothu	Netri Kungumam	Justin Prabhakaran	V. V. Prasanna
2017	Panjumittai	Manasula Irukkudhu Aasai	D. Imman	Sarath Santhosh
2017	Tubelight	Ceylonu Silk Nila	Indra	Solo
2017	Ka Ka Ka: Aabathin Arikuri	Sila Sil Sila	Amrit	Haricharan
2017	Naanthan Sabhana	"Naalumey"	Rochak Kohli	Solo
2018	Adanga Maru	"Sayaali"	Sam C. S.	Sathya Prakash
2018	96	"Vasantha Kaalangal"	Govind Vasantha	Solo
2018	96	"Thaabangale"	Govind Vasantha	Pradeep Kumar
2018	96	"Iravingu Theevai"	Govind Vasantha	Pradeep Kumar
2018	96	"Kaathalae Kaathalae"(Version 1)	Govind Vasantha	Govind Vasantha
2018	96	"Kaathalae Kaathalae"(Version 2)	Govind Vasantha	Govind Vasantha, Kalyani Menon
2018	96	"Anthaathi"	Govind Vasantha	Govind Vasantha, Bhadra Rajin, M. Nassar
2018	Thamizh Padam 2.0	"Kalavarame"	Kannan	Pradeep Kumar
2018	Maniyaar Kudumbam	"Sleepi Kanda Meenu"	Thambi Ramaiah	Karthik
2018	Mr. Chandramouli	"Yedhedho Aanene"	Sam C. S.	Sam C. S.
2018	Iravukku Aayiram Kangal	"Uyir Uruvaatha"	Sam C. S.	Sathya Prakash
2018	Thodraa	"Oru Kadhal Kalavani"	RN Uthamaraja	Solo
2018	Nagesh Thiraiyarangam	"Kadhal Nilaithane"	Srikanth Deva	Solo
2018	Seyal	"Neeye Uyre"	Siddharth Vipin	Karthik
2018	Padaiveeran	"Idhuvarai Naan"(Female)	Karthik Raja	Solo
2018	Madura Veeran	"Un Nenjukkulla"	Santhosh Dhayanidhi	Solo
2018	Vidhi Madhi Ultaa	"Un Nerukkam Vaazhum"	Ashwin Vinayagamoorthy	Sid Sriram
2018	Udumbara	"Chinna Poove"	Dhina	Haricharan
2018	Udumbara	"Lankamma"	Dhina	Haricharan
2018	Yaagam	"Uyirin Mele"	Koti	Yazin Nizar
2018	Santhoshathil Kalavaram	"Kaala Kaalam Kadhal Kaalam"	Sivanag	P. Unnikrishnan
2019	Thambi	"Thaalelo"	Govind Vasantha	Solo
2019	Naanum Single Thaan	"Ithuvarai"	Hitesh Manjunath	Nivas
2019	Asuran	"Yen Minukki"	G. V. Prakash Kumar	Teejay Arunasalam
2019	Asuran	"Yen Minukki" (Reprise)	G. V. Prakash Kumar	G. V. Prakash Kumar
2019	Bigil	"Maatharey"	A. R. Rahman	Madhura Dhara Talluri, Sireesha, Akshara, Vithusayini
2019	Sarvam Thaala Mayam	"Maya Maya"	A. R. Rahman	Solo
2019	Kurukshethram (D)	"Jumma Jumma"	V. Harikrishna	Mano
2019	Devarattam	"Lesa Lesa"	Nivas K. Prasanna	Solo
2019	House Owner	"Neeyagave"	Ghibran	Sathya Prakash
2019	LKG	"Thamizh Anthem Song"	Leon James	P. Susheela, Vani Jayaram, L. R. Eswari, Sid Sriram
2019	Thanimai	"Veral Regai"	Dhina	Solo
2019	Pulanaivu	"Pulanaivu Theme"	Jey Raggaveindra	Solo
2020	Silence	"Naan Unarvodu"	Gopi Sundar	Solo
2020	Ponmagal Vandhal	"Vaan Thooralgal"	Govind Vasantha	Solo
2020	Naanga Romba Busy	"Raathiri"	C. Sathya	Sathyaprakash
2020	Jaanu	"Theera"	Govind Vasantha	Govind Vasantha
2020	Jaanu	"Kanaave"	Govind Vasantha	Solo
2021	Nayae Peyae	"Unakkaga"(Female)	N. R. Raghunanthan	Solo
2021	Nayae Peyae	"Ninaithathai"	N. R. Raghunanthan	Solo
2021	Chakra	"Amma Song"	Yuvan Shankar Raja	Prarthana Indrajith
2021	Navarasa	"Yaadho"	Govind Vasantha	Solo
2021	Annabelle Sethupathi	"Vaanil Megham"	Krishna Kishor	Armaan Malik
2021	N4	"Thaniyae Kaadhal"	Balasubramanian G	Abhay Jodhpurkar
2021	Paris Paris	"Vaazhve Neelaadhe"	Amit Trivedi	Sathya Prakash
2021	Rocky	"Aalilalilo"	Darbuka Siva	Solo
2021	Kundrathiley Kumaranukku Kondattam	"Theera Theera"	S. Shankar	Solo
2021	Sila Nerangalil Sila Manidhargal	"Vizhi Pesum"	Radhan	Haricharan
2021	Rajavamsam	"Oor Thevadha Boomiyila"	Sam C. S.	Solo
2021	Marakkar: Lion of the Arabian Sea (D)	"Ilaveyil"	Ronnie Raphael	Sathya Prakash
2022	Kombu Vacha Singamda	"Pesatha Mozhiye"	Dhibu Ninan Thomas	K.S. Harisankar
2022	Carbon	"Yela Yela"	Sam C. S.	Solo
2022	Bell	"Itharkuthan"	Robert	Sathya Prakash
2022	Mayan	"Sita Kalyanam"	M.S.Jones Rupert	Deepthi Suresh, M.S.Jones Rupert
2022	Vaaitha	"Paarvai Vanna"(Female)	Loceshwaran C	M. M. Manasi
2022	Vaaitha	"Paarvai Vanna"(Duet)	Loceshwaran C	M Krishnaraj, M. M. Manasi
2022	Samrat Prithviraj (D)	"Menmayaay"	Shankar–Ehsaan–Loy	Haricharan
2022	Vikrant Rona (D)	"Hey Fakira"	B. Ajaneesh Loknath	Sanjith Hegde, B. Ajaneesh Loknath, Anup Bhandari
2022	Sivi 2	"Theendum Thegam"	F. S. Faizal	Solo
2022	Sita Ramam (D)	"Piriyadhey"	Vishal Chandrashekhar	Kapil Kapilan
2022	Raangi	"Paniththuli"	C. Sathya	C. Sathya, Yazin Nizar
2022	Repeat Shoe	"Thaiyinai Thediyae"	Sam C. S.	Solo
2022	Kaalangalil Aval Vasantham	"Thanimai Sirayiley"	Hari S R	Solo
2022	Kantara (D)	"He Semmandha Ahzage"	B. Ajaneesh Loknath	Haricharan
2022	One Way	"Chinnanjiru Kiliye"	Aswin Hemanth	Gowtham Bharathwaj
2022	Yashoda (D)	"Nee En Anbaana Thangai"	Mani Sharma	
2022	Second Show	"Yeno Yeno"	Praneev Verl	Sathya Prakash
2023	Shaakuntalam (D)	"Risivananthane"	Mani Sharma	Naresh Iyer
2023	Mudakkaruthaan	"Poovai Thirakkum"	Sirpy	Solo
2023	Kasethan Kadavulada	"Indru Vandha"	Raj Pratap	Solo
2023	Thugs	"Ey Azhagiye"	Sam C. S.	Kapil Kapilan
2023	Kondraal Paavam	"Pa Pappa"	Sam C. S.	Solo
2023	Takkar	"Maragatha Maalai"	Nivas K. Prasanna	Pradeep Kumar, Vijay Yesudas
2023	Kabadi Bro	"Yetho Mayakkam"	A. J. Daniel	Karthik
2023	Regina	"Naam Ulaavum Oadai"	Sathish Nair	Solo
2023	Kushi (D)	"Aradhya"	Hesham Abdul Wahab	Sid Sriram
2023	Irugapatru	"Yeno Yeno Manadhiley"	Justin Prabhakaran	Sathya Prakash
2023	The Road	"Dummalangi"	Sam C. S.	Sameera Baradwaj
2023	Hi Nanna (D)	"Nizhaliyae"	Hesham Abdul Wahab	Anurag Kulkarni
2023	Hi Nanna (D)	"Nyamaliye"	Hesham Abdul Wahab	Anurag Kulkarni
2023	Hi Nanna (D)	"Odiyamma"	Hesham Abdul Wahab	Dhruv Vikram, Shruti Haasan
2023	Navayuga Kannagi	"Naadaga Kaadhal Anthem"	Alvin	Solo
2023	Chevvaikizhamai (D)	"Poompaavaiye"	B. Ajaneesh Loknath	Solo
2024	Aadujeevitham (D)	"Pathikatha Thee"	A. R. Rahman	Vijay Yesudas, Rakshita Suresh
2024	Aalakaalam	"Anbile Undhan Anbile"	N. R. Raghunanthan	G. V. Prakash Kumar
2024	Por	"Nam Kural"	Elroy Vincent	Solo
2024	Heeramandi (D)	"Ilamangai Inba Theeve"	Sanjay Leela Bhansali	Solo
2024	Garudan	"Iruthiyai Nee"	Yuvan Shankar Raja	Solo
2024	Kozhipannai Chelladurai	"Kathirundhen"	N. R. Raghunanthan	Solo
2024	Aalan	"Yaazhisaiye"	Manoj Krishna	Solo
2024	Seeran	"Enna Solla"	A.K.Sasidaran, Aravind Gerald	Naresh Iyer
2024	Mr.Celebrity (D)	"Unnale Unnale"	Vinod Yajamanya	Solo
2025	Maanavan	"Paaraai Paaraai"	Ghibran	Solo
2025	Chennai City Gangsters	"O Meri Jaan"	D. Imman	Vijay Prakash
2025	Kannappa (D)	"Love Song"	Stephen Devassy	Haricharan
2025	The Girlfriend (D)	"Thaedi Nindren"	Hesham Abdul Wahab	Hesham Abdul Wahab, Rahul Ravindran
2025	The Girlfriend (D)	"O Kelvikkuriye"	Hesham Abdul Wahab	Hesham Abdul Wahab
2025	Myyal	"Kannala Vala Veesuran"	Amargeeth	Solo
2025	Maddy Engira Madhavan	"Yaarathu Yaarathu"	Hesham Abdul Wahab	Haricharan
2025	Thug Life	"Muththa Mazhai (Reprise)"	A. R. Rahman	Solo
2025	3BHK	"Kaanalin Mele"	Amrit Ramnath	Sooraj Santhosh
2025	Jenma Natchathiram	"Manamo"	Sanjay Manickam	
2025	Usurae	"Kaanatha Kanave"	Kiran Joze	Sathya Prakash
2025	Usurae	"Nee En Ulagame"	Kiran Joze	Sreekanth Hariharan
2025	Bison Kaalamaadan	"Cheenikkallu"	Nivas K. Prasanna	Vijay Yesudas
2025	Aaromaley	"Intro Reel Love Theme" (Humming Vocals)	Siddhu Kumar	Solo
2025	Aaromaley	"Eppadi Vandhaayo"	Siddhu Kumar	Anand Aravindakshan
2025	Por Paravai	"Vinnum Mannum"	Midhun Narayanan	Solo
2025	Kantara: Chapter 1 (D)	"Vaenguzhalil Ezhaindayadi"	B. Ajaneesh Loknath	K. S. Harisankar
2025	Indian Penal Law (IPL)	"Yaavalo"	Ashwin Vinayagamoorthy	Shivam Mahadevan
2025	Indian Penal Law (IPL)	"Yaavalo" (Reprise)	Ashwin Vinayagamoorthy	Shivam Mahadevan
2025	Anantha	"Sri Sathya Sai Baba"	Deva	Hariharan
2025	Sirai	"Neelothi"	Justin Prabhakaran	Sooraj Santhosh
2026	My Lord	"Esa Kaaththa"	Sean Roldan	Satya Prakash
2026	Draupathi 2	"EmKoney (Reprise)"	Ghibran	Solo
2026	29	"Seelay Seelay"	Sean Roldan	
2026	Vadam	"Aasa Kalavaaniye"	D. Imman	Solo
2026	Maragatha Malai	"Yaazh Nenjaththai"	L.V. Muthu Ganesh	Solo
2026	Maragatha Malai	"Thaka Thakita"	L.V. Muthu Ganesh	Solo
2026	Satan – The Dark	"Kural"	Aswin Krishna	Solo
2026	Nooru Saami	"Maaya Kanavo"	Balaji Sriram	Kapil Kapilan
2026	Leader	"Theera Theera"	Ghibran	Haricharan
2026	Karikaadan (D)	"Needane Needane"	Athishay Jain	
2026	Andharan	"Adada Thiruda"	Hari S R	
2026	Anbil Avan	"Aasai Varame"	Govind Vasantha	Govind Vasantha
2026	Anbil Avan	"Aasai Varame (Rock Version)"	Govind Vasantha	Sid Sriram
2026	XY	"Paranthu Pogum"	Srikant Krishna	
2026	Ramayana: Part 1 (D)	"Jai Jai Rama"	A. R. Rahman	Haricharan
2026	America Aavi	"Vaaraadhu Vandha"	Adish Uthrian	Harish Raghavendra

== List of Telugu songs ==
Year	Film title	Song title	Composer(s)	Co-singer(s)
2002	Amrutha (D)	"Ye Devi Varamu"(Female)	A. R. Rahman	Hariharan
2002	Amrutha (D)	"Ye Devi Varamu"(Male)	A. R. Rahman	S. P. Balasubrahmanyam
2002	Allari	"Kingini Mingini"	Paul Jacob	Suresh Peters, Aparna
2003	Naaga	"Megham Karigenu"	Deva	Karthik
2003	Boys (D)	"Please Sir"	A. R. Rahman	Kunal Ganjawala, Clinton Cerejo, S. P. Charan
2003	Nee Manasu Naaku Telusu	"Kalusu Kundhama"	A. R. Rahman	Unni Menon
2003	Nee Manasu Naaku Telusu	"Snehitude Unte"	A. R. Rahman	Mano, P. Unnikrishnan
2004	Prema Chadharangam	"Vendi Theralo"	Harris Jayaraj	
2005	Kalisunte (D)	"Jil Jil Vaana"	Yuvan Shankar Raja	Sathyan
2006	Chukkallo Chandrudu	"Prema Paravasam"	Chakri	Karthik
2006	Jadoo	"Aakashamalle"	Yuvan Shankar Raja	Karthik
2006	Jadoo	"Thaluku Thaluku"	Yuvan Shankar Raja	Ranjith
2006	Tata Birla Madhyalo Laila	"Poovai Pona Cheliya"	M. M. Srilekha	Vijay Yesudas
2006	Vesavi (D)	"Khadhane Nadipe"	G. V. Prakash Kumar	Karthik
2007	Drohi (D)	"Undaleni"	Harris Jayaraj	
2007	Gurukanth (D)	"Nuvvu Lekha"	A. R. Rahman	A. R. Rahman
2007	Gurukanth (D)	"Mayya Mayya"	A. R. Rahman	Mariam Toller
2007	Maatarani Mounamidhi (D)	"Saage Nadhi" (Female)	Vidyasagar	
2007	Malligadu (D)	"Aiyyaiyo"	Yuvan Shankar Raja	Mukesh
2007	Munna	"Chammakkuro"	Harris Jayaraj	Karthik, Anushka
2007	Neevalle Neevalle (D)	"Hello Sir"	Harris Jayaraj	
2007	Sivaji (D)	"Sahana"	A. R. Rahman	Udit Narayan
2008	Andhamaina Manasulo	"Anuyuddham"	R. P. Patnaik	Pranavi
2008	Bheema (D)	"O Manasa"	Harris Jayaraj	Sadhana Sargam
2008	Ekaloveyudu	"Happyga Unta"	Anil Krishna	Karthik
2008	Karthika Maasam	"Neevu Leni Vela"	Lakshmi Vinayak	S. P. Charan
2008	Maa Vaadu (D)	"Nijamena"	Yuvan Shankar Raja	Rakhi
2008	Malli Vs Raviteja (D)	"Naa Praanamey"	S. S. Kumaran	
2008	Naa Manasukemaindi	"Sakhude"	R. P. Patnaik	Karthik
2008	Nesthama	"Ye Janmadho"	Joy Calvin	Karthik
2008	Nesthama	"Ee Vela Naalo"	Joy Calvin	
2008	Thinnama Padukunnama Thellarindha	"Padaharu Kanne"	M. M. Srilekha	Haricharan
2008	Wall Poster	"Jil Jil Nene"	Lawerence Dasari	
2009	Ghatikudu(D)	"Mrogindhi"	Harris Jayaraj	Rahul Nambiar
2009	Manjeera	"Tholi Tholi Saariga"	Shekar Chandra	
2009	Priya Priyathama	"Oho Oho Oorodili"	Vidyasagar	
2009	Satyameva Jayate	"Love You"	Chinna	Rahul Nambiar
2009	Snehituda	"Chiluka Navvave"	Shivaram Shankar	Karthik
2009	Sweet Heart	"Manasuki Rangulu"	Nandan Raj	Karthik
2009	Tholi Paata	"Gunde Vedhane"	Krishna Vaasa	
2009	Veedokkade(D)	"Oyaayiye Aayiye"	Harris Jayaraj	Benny Dayal
2010	Bheemili Kabaddi Jattu	"Naalo Parugulu"	V. Selvaganesh	Karthik
2010	Bindaas	"Girija Girija"	Bobo Shashi	Karthik
2010	Manmadha Baanam (D)	"Kannu Kannu"	Devi Sri Prasad	S. P. Balasubrahmanyam
2010	Orange	"Rooba Rooba"	Harris Jayaraj	Shahil Hada, Maya Iyer
2010	Padmavyuham	"Thelipoyena"	James Vasanthan	S. P. Balasubrahmanyam
2010	Police Police	"Aaja Sakhi"	Sai Karthik	Prasanna
2010	Robo (D)	"Kilimanjaro"	A. R. Rahman	Javed Ali
2010	Shopping Mall (D)	"Kathalanu Cheppe"	G. V. Prakash Kumar	Rakendu Mouli
2010	Shopping Mall (D)	"Naa Praanam"	G. V. Prakash Kumar	Haricharan
2010	Thakita Thakita	"Manase Ato"	Bobo Shashi	Karthik
2010	Ye Maaya Chesave	"Manasa"	A. R. Rahman	Devan Ekambaram
2011	Daggaraga Dooranga	"Anakey"	Raghu Kunche	Raghu Kunche
2011	G One (D)	"Em Nathone"	Vishal–Shekhar	
2011	Mogudu	"Aakalakalala"	B Babu Shankar	Hemachandra
2011	Ninnu Chusthe Love Vasthundhi (D)	"Ninne Ninne"	Harris Jayaraj	Harish Raghavendra
2011	Oosaravelli	"Yelango Yelango"	Devi Sri Prasad	Jaspreet Jasz
2011	Pilla Zamindar	"Oopiri"	V. Selvaganesh	Karthik
2011	Priyudu	"Albela Albela"	Mohan Jona	Vijay Prakash
2011	Rangam (D)	"Nemali"	Harris Jayaraj	P. Unnikrishnan, Shweta
2011	Shakthi	"Mathileka Pichiga"	Mani Sharma	Ranjith
2011	Urumi (D)	"Neevevaro"	Deepak Dev	Karthik
2012	Devudu Chesina Manushulu	"Yemi Sethura"	Raghu Kunche	Udit Narayan
2012	Em Babu Laddu Kavala	"Entha Baagundho"	M. M. Srilekha	Simha
2012	Endukante Premanta!	"Yegiri Pove"	G. V. Prakash Kumar	Hemachandra
2012	Gajaraju (D)	"Cheppinaadhey Thana Premani"	D. Imman	Ranjith
2012	Mask	"Maayavi"	K	
2012	Neeku Naaku Dash Dash	"Nee Kopam"	Yashwanth Nag	Naresh Iyer
2012	Ok Ok (D)	"Akhila Akhila"	Harris Jayaraj	Aalap Raju
2012	Snehithudu (D)	"Aska Laska"	Harris Jayaraj	Vijay Prakash
2012	Thuppakki (D)	"Vellosthaana"	Harris Jayaraj	Karthik
2013	555	"Manasuki"	Simon K. King	Haricharan
2013	ABCD: Any Body Can Dance	"Puvvulu Ruvvina"	Sachin–Jigar	
2013	Anna (D)	"Yem Maya Jaruguthundo"	G. V. Prakash Kumar	Rakendu Mouli
2013	Kadali (D)	"Magidi Magidi"	A. R. Rahman	Dinesh, Tanvi Shah
2013	Na Saami Ranga	"Ento Gonthu"	Agasthya	Anand
2013	Nenem Chinna Pillana	"Nelakila Dhigi Vachenule"	M. M. Srilekha	Ranjith
2013	Om 3D	"Endhukila"	Achu Rajamani	Haricharan
2013	Paradesi (D)	"Allari Kanna"	G. V. Prakash Kumar	Rakendu Mouli
2013	Park	"If You Wanna"	M. M. Srilekha	Krishna
2013	Sevakudu	"Aa Devudu Puttinchadu"	Srikanth Deva	Harish Raghavendra
2013	Traffic (D)	"Kalale" (Female)	Mejo Joseph	
2013	Traffic (D)	"Kalale" (Duet)	Mejo Joseph	P. Unnikrishnan
2013	Varna (D)	"Tholi Merupaa"	Harris Jayaraj	Karthik
2013	Varna (D)	"Raathiri Okadini Kalisaane"	Anirudh Ravichander	Solo
2013	Welcome Obama	"Buji Buji Nadakalatho"	Singeetam Srinivasa Rao	
2013	Welcome Obama	"Aakaashanante"	Singeetam Srinivasa Rao	
2014	Aaha Kalyanam	"Mike Testing 123"	Dharan Kumar	
2014	Band Balu	"Naa Raaka Kosam"	Chinna	Karthik
2014	Current Theega	"Padhaharellaina"	Achu Rajamani	
2014	Govindudu Andarivadele	"Ra Rakumara"	Yuvan Shankar Raja	
2014	Ishq Wala Love	"Merusthondi"	Avinash–Vishwajeet	Rakendu Mouli
2014	Karthikeya	"Inthalo Ennenno"(Female)	Shekar Chandra	
2014	Nene (D)	"Laksha Calorie"	Harris Jayaraj	Arjun Menon
2014	Nene (D)	"Ninne Ninne"	Harris Jayaraj	P. Unnikrishnan
2014	Pooja (D)	"Madhilona"	Yuvan Shankar Raja	Karthik
2014	Ra Ra Krishnayya	"Onam Onam"	Achu Rajamani	Achu Rajamani
2014	Run Raja Run	"Vadhantune"	Ghibran	
2014	Vikramasimha (D)	"Hridhayam"	A. R. Rahman	Mano
2014	Weekend Love	"Edho Edho Chebuthundhi"	Shekar Chandra	Geetha Madhuri
2014	Yamaleela 2	"Praana Bandhama"	S. V. Krishna Reddy	Nivas
2015	Abbayitho Ammayi	"Kanulu Kalanu"	Ilaiyaraaja	Haricharan
2015	Anekudu (D)	"Roja Kadalee"	Harris Jayaraj	Vijay Prakash
2015	Bhale Bhale Magadivoy	"Hello Hello"	Gopi Sundar	Karthik
2015	Jayasurya (D)	"Telugu Thanama"	D. Imman	Hemachandhra
2015	Malli Malli Idi Rani Roju	"Enno Enno"	Gopi Sundar	Karthik
2015	Mama Manchu Alludu Kanchu	"Chamma Chakka"	Koti	Tippu, Priya, Kumari
2015	Mosagallaku Mosagadu	"Naavaadai"	Manikanth Kadri	Nakul Abhyankar
2015	Nenu Rowdy Ne (D)	"Nuvvu Nenu"	Anirudh Ravichander	Ranjith
2015	Prema Leela	"Prema Thana Dhanamaaye"	Himesh Reshammiya	
2015	Prema Leela	"Aathanike Thelusa"	Himesh Reshammiya	
2015	Prema Leela	"Nijame Priyaa"	Himesh Reshammiya	
2015	Puli (D)	"Manmadhuda"	Devi Sri Prasad	Sooraj Santhosh, Karthikeyan
2015	Rakshasudu (D)	"Nee Needavutha"	Yuvan Shankar Raja	Karthik
2015	Rudhrammadevi	"Anthahpuramlo"	Ilaiyaraaja	Sadhana Sargam, Chitra
2015	Surya vs Surya	"Vennellona"(Female)	Satya Mahaveer	
2015	Surya vs Surya	"Vennellona"(Duet)	Satya Mahaveer	Karthik
2015	Yentha Vaadu Gaani (D)	"Manasuna Edo Raagam"	Harris Jayaraj	
2016	24 (D)	"Prema Parichayame"	A. R. Rahman	Hriday Gattani
2016	Babu Bangaram	"Raaka Raaka"	Ghibran	Yazin Nizar
2016	Janaki Ramudu	"Varamaa Varamaa"	Gifton Elias	
2016	Kalyana Vaibhogame	"Manasantha Meghamai"	Kalyani Malik	
2016	Kotikokkadu (D)	"Daama Daama"	D. Imman	
2016	Love Cheyyala Vadda	"Sakhiya"	Dany Gautham	Karthik
2016	Majnu	"Oye Meghamala"	Gopi Sundar	
2016	Nannu Vadali Neevu Polevule	"Mora Saiyyan"	Amrit	Haricharan
2016	Nayaki	"Idhemito"	Raghu Kunche	
2016	Sahasam Swasaga Sagipo	"Kannula Mundhe"	A. R. Rahman	Haricharan
2016	Sardaar Gabbar Singh	"Nee Chepa Kallu"	Devi Sri Prasad	Sagar
2017	Cheliya (D)	"Allei Allei"	A. R. Rahman	Abhay Jodhpurkar
2017	Gruham	"Kaatuka Kanne"	Girishh G.	Sathyaprakash
2017	Nene Sabhana	"Yeanaadu"	Rochak Kohli	
2017	Ninnu Kori	"Unnattundi Gunde"	Gopi Sundar	Karthik
2017	Premika	"Innallu Enaadu"	Dilip Bandaari	
2017	Rogue	"Ghumshuda"	Sunil Kashyap	
2017	Tholi Prarichayam	"Lalijo Jo Lalijo"	Indraganti	
2017	Ungarala Rambabu	"Nuvve Naa Adhrushtam"	Ghibran	L. V. Revanth
2017	Ungarala Rambabu	"Allari Pillagaada"	Ghibran	Dhanunjay
2018	Ala	"Kougillalo"	Srinivasa Sharma Rani	
2018	Chi La Sow	"Mellaga Mellaga"	Prashanth R Vihari	
2018	Chi La Sow	"Chi La Sow"	Prashanth R Vihari	Pranav Chaganti, Diwakar
2018	Geetha Govindam	"Yenti Yenti"	Gopi Sundar	
2018	Needi Naadi Oke Katha	"Edho Jarige"	Suresh Bobbili	
2018	Sharabha	"Ottesi Chebutha"	Koti	Yazin Nizar
2018	Tej I Love You	"Andhamaina"	Gopi Sundar	Haricharan
2019	Arjun Suravaram	"Kanne Kanne"	Sam C. S.	Anurag Kulkarni
2019	Chanakya	"Ohh My Love"	Sricharan Pakala	Poojan Kohli
2019	Dear Comrade	"O Kalala Kathala"	Justin Prabhakaran	Sathya Prakash
2019	Dhrusti	"Dhrusti Theme"	Naresh Kumaran	Vedala Hemachandra, Roll Rida
2019	Donga (D)	"Yenaadu Pandage"	Govind Vasantha	Solo
2019	Dorasaani	"Kallalo Kalavaramai"	Prashanth R Vihari	Solo
2019	Evaru	"Ennenno"	Sricharan Pakala	Solo
2019	Hippi	"Hey Yela" (Female)	Nivas K. Prasanna	Solo
2019	Kurukshetram (D)	"Jumma Jumma"	V. Harikrishna	Mano
2019	Lakshmi's NTR	"Sisiraniki"	Kalyani Malik	Kalyani Malik
2019	Madhanam	"Choosa"	Ron Ethan Yohann	
2019	Madhanam	"Yegire Yegire" (Humming)	Ron Ethan Yohann	Sid Sriram
2019	Majili	"Priyathama Priyathama"	Gopi Sundar	Solo
2019	Majili	"Ye Manishike"	Gopi Sundar	Arun Gopan, Baby Anusha
2019	Manmadhudu 2	"Naalona"	Chaitan Bharadwaj	Solo
2019	Manmadhudu 2	"Maa Chakkani"	Chaitan Bharadwaj	Anurag Kulkarni, Deepti Parathasarathy
2019	Runam	"Yemito Ee Sambaram"	S V Mallik Teja	Haricharan
2019	Tholu Bommalata	"Manasara" (Female)	Suresh Bobbili	
2019	Tholu Bommalata	"Manasara" (Duet)	Suresh Bobbili	Sid Sriram
2019	Undiporadhey	"Cheliya Nee Paluke"	Sabu Varghese	Haricharan
2019	Whistle (D)	"Maanini"	A. R. Rahman	Madhura Dhara Talluri, Sireesha Bhagavatula
2020	Choosi Choodangaane	"Venakane Unna"	Gopi Sundar	
2020	Degree College	"Saradhaga" (Female)	Sunil Kashyap	
2020	Jaanu	"Inthena"	Govind Vasantha	
2020	Jaanu	"Pranam"	Govind Vasantha	Gowtham Bharadwaj
2020	Jaanu	"Oohale"	Govind Vasantha	Govind Vasantha
2020	Jaanu	"Komma Veedi"	Govind Vasantha	Govind Vasantha
2020	Jaanu	"Anantham"	Govind Vasantha	Govind Vasantha
2020	Amrutharamam	"Naala Neeve"	N S Prasu	
2020	Amrutharamam	"Neeve Naaku"	N S Prasu	Thota Subbarao
2020	Nishabdham	"Nee Kanupaapa"	Gopi Sundar	
2021	Cycle	"Prema Nuvvekkada"	G M Sathish	Harini
2021	Chakra (D)	"Amma Nuvvante"	Yuvan Shankar Raja	Prarthana Indrajith
2021	Ippudu Kaaka Inkeppudu	"Unnana Unnana"	Sahitya Sagar	Krishna Chaitanya
2021	Merise Merise	"Kannulatho Rachinchu"	Karthik Kodakandla	Vijay Prakash
2021	Kanabadutaledu	"Gunde Lothullo"	Madhu Ponnas	
2021	Vivaha Bhojanambu	"Devi Kalyana Vaibhoghame"	AniVee	Anthony Daasan
2021	My Indian Boy Friend	"Inthalo"	Shravan Bharadwaj	Solo
2021	Annabelle Sethupathi (D)	"Devi Nadayade"	Krishna Kishor	Anurag Kulkarni
2021	Natyam	"Thoorpu Padamara"	Shravan Bharadwaj	Kaala Bhairava
2021	Varudu Kaavalenu	"Manasulone Nilichipoke"	Vishal Chandrashekhar	
2021	Romantic	"Nuvvu Nenu E Kshanam"	Sunil Kashyap	
2021	Peddanna (D)	"Ye Jenmalo" (Female)	D. Imman	
2021	Pushpaka Vimanam	"Swamy Ra Ra"	Amit N Dasani	
2021	Missing	"Solo Life" (Female)	Ajay Arasada	
2021	Marakkar (D)	"Kanulanu Kalipina"	Ronnie Raphael	Sathya Prakash
2022	Dheyyamtho Sahajeevanam	"Meghalalo Harivillula"	Ravi Shankar	
2022	Nallamalla	"Padha Padha Padhara"	Peddapalli Rohith (PR)	
2022	1996 Dharmapuri	"Nadichaa Nadichaa"	Osho Venkat	Sri Krishna
2022	Shekar	"Chinni Chinni Praanam"	Anup Rubens	
2022	Major	"Oh Isha"	Sricharan Pakala	Armaan Malik
2022	Samrat Prithviraj (D)	"Mrudhumayee"	Shankar–Ehsaan–Loy	Haricharan
2022	10th Class Diaries	"Egirey Egirey"	Suresh Bobbili	
2022	Vikrant Rona (D)	"Hey Fakira"	B. Ajaneesh Loknath	Sanjith Hegde, B. Ajaneesh Loknath, Anup Bhandari
2022	Bimbisara	"Gulebakavali"	Chirrantan Bhatt	Solo
2022	Sita Ramam	"Oh Prema"	Vishal Chandrashekhar	Kapil Kapilan
2022	Aakasha Veedhullo	"Paravasinchele"	Judah Sandhy	
2022	The Life Of Muthu (D)	"Ninnu Talachitey"	A. R. Rahman	Sarthak Kalyani
2022	Boyfriend for Hire	"Neevevvaro"	Gopi Sundar	Solo
2022	Boyfriend for Hire	"Kallalona"	Gopi Sundar	L. V. Revanth
2022	Ninne Pelladatha	"Sakhuda"	Navaneet	Spandhana Puppala
2022	Kantara (D)	"Andhaala Nadhive"	B. Ajaneesh Loknath	Haricharan
2022	Matti Kusthi (D)	"Nuvve Leni"	Justin Prabhakaran	Justin Prabhakaran
2022	Panchathanthram	"Arere Arere"	Prashanth R Vihari	S. P. Charan
2023	Nede Vidudhala	"Preminchan Annavu"	Ajay Arasada	Anurag Kulkarni
2023	O Kala	"O Kala"	Neelesh Mandalapu	
2023	Shaakuntalam	"Rushivanamlona"	Mani Sharma	Sid Sriram
2023	Ponniyin Selvan: II (D)	"Veera Raja Veera"	A. R. Rahman	Shankar Mahadevan
2023	Takkar (D)	"Pedhavulu Veedi Mounam"	Nivas K. Prasanna	Deepak Blue
2023	Regina	"O Ananthamaina Saagaram"	Sathish Nair	Solo
2023	Dilse	"Kadalai Maare"	Srikar Velamuri	
2023	Priyamaina Priya (D)	"Alalu Kalalu"	Srikanth Deva	Aalap Raju
2023	Kushi	"Aradhya"	Hesham Abdul Wahab	Sid Sriram
2023	Kushi	"Jo Achyutananda" (Film Version)	Annamacharya	
2023	Chinna (D)	"Kaalam Edho"	Dhibu Ninan Thomas	Nakul Abhyankar
2023	Narakasura	"Ninnu Vadhali"	Nawfal Raja AIS	Vijay Prakash
2023	Mangalavaaram	"O Praanama"	B. Ajaneesh Loknath	
2023	Hi Nanna	"Odiyamma"	Hesham Abdul Wahab	Dhruv Vikram, Shruti Haasan
2024	Aadujeevitham (D)	"Sarasa Raaga"	A. R. Rahman	Vijay Yesudas, Rakshita Suresh
2024	Heeramandi (D)	"Merise Kallallo"	Sanjay Leela Bhansali	Solo
2024	Darshini	"Naalo Evo"	Nizani Anjan	Naresh Iyer
2024	Love Mouli	"Sita Ram"	Govind Vasantha	
2024	Laggam	"Laga Laaga Laggam"	Charan Arjun	Sri Krishna, Shreenika Mahathi
2024	Neeli Megha Shyama	"Arere Manase"	Shravan Bharadwaj	
2024	Sasivadane	"Sasivadane"	Saravana Vasudevan	Haricharan
2024	Vasthavam	"Chinni Gundelo"	Peddapalli Rohith (PR)	
2024	Prabuthva Junior Kalashala	"Challa Gaali"	Karthik Rodriguez	Chaitu Satsangi
2025	Naari: The Women	"Nishi lo Sashi laa"	Vinod Kumar (Vinnu)	
2025	Oka Brundavanam	"Pasi Pasi Thanamey"	Sunny - Saketh	
2025	23 Iravai Moodu	"Cherasala"	Mark K Robin	Kapil Kapilan
2025	Single	"Naa Kanti Paapallona"	Vishal Chandrashekhar	
2025	Thug Life (D)	"Muddu Vaana"	A. R. Rahman	
2025	Mahavatar Narsimha (D)	"Thanuvu Mosina Praanamaa"	Sam C. S.	
2025	Meghalu Cheppina Prema Katha	"Gala Gala"	Justin Prabhakaran	Karthik
2025	Virgin Boys	"Radhakrishna"	Smaran	Gowtham Bharadwaj
2025	The Girlfriend	"Reyi Lolothula"	Hesham Abdul Wahab	Hesham Abdul Wahab, Vijay Devarakonda
2025	The Girlfriend	"Em Jaruguthondhi"	Hesham Abdul Wahab	Hesham Abdul Wahab
2025	Gatha Vaibhava	"Varnamaala"	Judah Sandhy	Anurag Kulkarni
2025	Kantara: Chapter 1 (D)	"Raave Ika Priya Bhamini"	B. Ajaneesh Loknath	Anurag Kulkarni
2025	Diamond Raja	"Aakashame Nuvvani"	Achu Rajamani	Sid Sriram
2025	11:11	"Oh Chinni Navvu"	Mani Sharma	Javed Ali
2025	Charitha Kaamakshi	"Chiru Bidiyam"	Abu	
2025	15 18 24 Love Story	"Ee Manchullo"	M L Raja	
2025	Maddy And Madhav	"Nesthama"	Hesham Abdul Wahab	Haricharan
2025	Raju Weds Rambai	"Ala Ala"	Suresh Bobbili	
2025	Love OTP	"Alaiponge"	Anand Rajavikram	Pancham Jeeva
2025	Anantha (D)	"Sri Sathya Sai Baba"	Deva	Hariharan
2026	Trimukha	"Enta Muddugunavro"	Vinod Yajamanya	
2026	Failure Boys	"Tolakari Vaana"	Vijay Bulganin	
2026	Failure Boys	Ekkadekkado	Vijay Bulganin	Rahul Nambiar
2026	Purushaha	"Chaatu Chaatu"	Shravan Bharadwaj	
2026	Dacoit: A Love Story	"Rubaroo"	Bheems Ceciroleo	
2026	Maa Inti Bangaaram	"Thassadiya"	Santhosh Narayanan	Punya Selva
2026	Batchmates	"Prathi Friend Uu"	Judah Sandhy	Krishna Tejasvi, Naga Ranjani
2026	Papam Prathap	"Vesangi Vellalo"	K.M. Radha Krishnan	
2026	Happy Journey	"Sithakokala"	Shekar Chandra	
2026	Tortoise	"Nee Parichayam"	Anup Rubens	Anup Rubens, Janhavi Yerram

== List of Hindi songs ==
Year	Film title	Song title	Composer(s)	Co-singer(s)
2026	Dacoit: A Love Story	"Rubaroo"	Bheems Ceciroleo	Faheem Abdullah
2025	Mahavatar Narsimha	"Jag Mein Tera Naam Ho"	Sam C. S.	Solo
2025	The Girlfriend (D)	"Chaand Baki Hai"	Hesham Abdul Wahab	Hesham Abdul Wahab, Rahul Ravindran
2025	The Girlfriend (D)	"Kya Ho Raha Hai Ye"	Hesham Abdul Wahab	Hesham Abdul Wahab
2025	Thug Life (D)	"Ang Ang Morey"	A. R. Rahman	Solo
2024	Aadujeevitham (D)	"Khatti Si Woh Imli"	A. R. Rahman	Armaan Malik, Rakshita Suresh
2024	AGR (D)	"Kya Yaad Tumhein"	A. R. Rahman	A. R. Ameen
2024	Ella	"Kahaniyan"	B. Ajaneesh Loknath	Solo
2023	Hi Pappa (D)	"Saaya Tera"	Hesham Abdul Wahab	Anurag Kulkarni
2023	Hi Pappa (D)	"Sun Liya"	Hesham Abdul Wahab	Anurag Kulkarni
2023	Hi Pappa (D)	"Odiyamma"	Hesham Abdul Wahab	Nakash Aziz, Vishnu Priya
2023	Mangalvaar (D)	"Ae Zindagi"	B. Ajaneesh Loknath	Solo
2023	Regina (D)	"Ye Hawa Khilaf Hai Tere"	Sathish Nair	Solo
2023	Shaakuntalam (D)	"Rushimooniyon Ka"	Mani Sharma	Naresh Iyer
2022	Yashoda (D)	"Meri Pyari Behna"	Mani Sharma	
2022	Kantara (D)	"Khawbon Mein"	B. Ajaneesh Loknath	Nakash Aziz
2022	Vikrant Rona (D)	"Hey Fakira"	B. Ajaneesh Loknath	Sanjith Hegde, B. Ajaneesh Loknath, Anup Bhandari
2022	Major	"Oh Isha"	Sricharan Pakala	Armaan Malik
2021	Gahan	"Hum Jo Mile" (Female)	V S Jithendra	Solo
2021	Marakkar: Lion of the Arabian Sea (D)	"Madhdham"	Ronnie Raphael	Sathya Prakash
2021	Annabelle Rathore (D)	"Dheere Chal"	Krishna Kishore	Javed Ali
2021	Pagglait	"Radha's Poem"	Arijit Singh	Solo
2019	Jhalki	"Chandamama"	Sandesh Shandilya	Solo
2019	Gun Pe Done	"Channa"	Rimi Dhar	Jasim Sharma
2016	Dongri Ka Raja	"Piya Tu Piya"	Asad Khan	Arijit Singh
2015	Puli (D)	"Baadalon"	Devi Sri Prasad	
2015	Brothers	"Mera Naam Mary Hai"	Ajay–Atul	Solo
2015	Guddu Rangeela	"Sooiyan"	Amit Trivedi	Arijit Singh
2015	Guddu Rangeela	"Saheban"	Amit Trivedi	Amit Trivedi, Shahid Mallya
2014	2 States	"Mast Magan"	Shankar–Ehsaan–Loy	Arijit Singh
2014	Samrat & Co	"O Humnava"	Mithoon	Gajendra Varma, Mithoon
2014	Samrat & Co	"Shukra Tera"	Mithoon	Arijit Singh
2014	Hasee Toh Phasee	"Zehnaseeb"	Vishal–Shekhar	Shekhar Ravjiani
2014	Hasee Toh Phasee	"Ishq Bulaava" (Film Version only)	Vishal–Shekhar	Sanam Puri
2013	Phata Poster Nikla Hero	"Main Rang Sharbaton Ka"	Pritam Chakraborty	Atif Aslam
2013	Chennai Express	"Titli"	Vishal–Shekhar	Gopi Sunder, Srimathumitha
2013	Raanjhanaa	"Ay Sakhi"	A. R. Rahman	Madhushree, Vaishali, Aanchal Sethi
2010	Lamhaa	"Madno"	Mithoon	Kshitij Tarey
2010	Lamhaa	"Sajnaa"	Mithoon	Mika Singh
2010	Robot (D)	"Kilimanjaro"	A. R. Rahman	Javed Ali
2010	Jhootha Hi Sahi	"Maiyya Yashoda" (Jamuna Mix)	A. R. Rahman	Javed Ali
2010	Jhootha Hi Sahi	"Maiyya Yashoda" (Thames Mix)	A. R. Rahman	Javed Ali
2009	Delhi-6	"Dil Gira Dafatan"	A. R. Rahman	Ash King
2008	Jaane Tu... Ya Jaane Na	"She is the One" (Background Score - Humming)	A. R. Rahman	
2007	Guru	"Tere Bina"	A. R. Rahman	A. R. Rahman, Murtuza Khan, Qadir Khan
2007	Guru	"Mayya"	A. R. Rahman	Maryem Tollar, Keerthi Sagathia
2007	Sivaji: The Boss (D)	"Suhana Sama" (Version l)	A. R. Rahman	Udit Narayan, A. R. Rahman
2007	Sivaji: The Boss (D)	"Suhana Sama" (Version ll)	A. R. Rahman	Udit Narayan
2005	Mangal Pandey	"Holi Re"	A. R. Rahman	Udit Narayan, Aamir Khan, Madhushree, Srinivas
2003	Boys (D)	"Please Sir"	A. R. Rahman	Kunal Ganjawala, Clinton Cerejo, SPB Charan

== List of Malayalam songs ==
Year	Film title	Song title	Composer(s)	Co-singer(s)
2026	Chinna Chinna Aasai	"Kanavaanathu"	Govind Vasantha	Solo
2026	Madhuvidhu	"En Kaathaake"	Hesham Abdul Wahab	
2025	Sarvam Maya	"Chiri Thottu"	Justin Prabhakaran	Justin Prabhakaran, Weldon
2025	Paathirathri	"Nilagamanam"	Jakes Bejoy	Solo
2025	The Girlfriend (D)	"Poke Poke"	Hesham Abdul Wahab	Hesham Abdul Wahab, Rahul Dev
2025	The Girlfriend (D)	"Nee Ariyunnundo"	Hesham Abdul Wahab	Hesham Abdul Wahab
2025	Super Star Kalyani	"Pathiye Pathiye"	Suresh Karthik	K. S. Harisankar
2025	Sahasam	"Naruthingal"	Bibin Ashok	Sooraj Santhosh, Bibin Ashok
2024	The Goat Life - Aadujeevitham	"Omane"	A. R. Rahman	Vijay Yesudas, Rakshita Suresh
2023	Hi Nanna (D)	"Odiyamma"	Hesham Abdul Wahab	Yazin Nizar, Divya Menon
2023	Chitta (D)	"Kannil Njano"	Dhibu Ninan Thomas	Haricharan
2023	Pachuvum Athbutha Vilakkum	"Nin Koode Njan Illayo"	Justin Prabhakaran	Gowtham Bharadwaj
2023	Shaakuntalam (D)	"Rishivanam Aagum"	Mani Sharma	Crisna
2023	Little Miss Rawther	"Snehadweepile"	Govind Vasantha	Pradeep Kumar
2022	19(1)(a)	"Paravakal"	Govind Vasantha	Solo
2022	Yashoda (D)	"Ennomal Anujjathi"	Mani Sharma	
2022	Vikrant Rona (D)	"Hey Fakira"	B. Ajaneesh Loknath	Hesham Abdul Wahab, B. Ajaneesh Loknath, Anup Bhandari
2019	A for Apple	"Thottu Thottu Vidarnnu"	Jerry Amaldev	Vijay Yesudas
2019	Oronnonnara Pranayakadha	"Udalodu Uyirupol"	Anand Madhusoodanan	Haricharan
2019	Dear Comrade (D)	"Ee Kathayo"	Justin Prabhakaran	Sathyaprakash
2017	Mersal (D)	"Macho"	A.R. Rahman	Sid Sriram
2017	Raja Kireedam	"Radhamma Radhamma"	Anoop Rubens	Vijay Yesudas
2017	C/O Saira Banu	"Aaromale"(Female)	Mejo Joseph	Solo
2016	Majnu	"Thoo Megham Pol"	Gopi Sunder	
2016	Sambar	"Oro Dhinam"	Sunny Viswanath	
2016	Mudhugauv	"Halli Sreehalli"	Rahul Raj	Rahul Raj
2016	Action Hero Biju	"Oonjalilaadi Vanna"	Jerry Amaldev	Jerry Amaldev
2015	Nirnayakam	"Ilaveyil Chirakkumaay"	M Jayachandran	Anoop Shankar
2014	Cousins	"Neeyen Vennila"	M Jayachandran	Haricharan
2012	Manthrikan	"Swarnatherileri"	S. Balakrishnan	Lijesh
2012	Hero	"Maayaathe Ormayil"	Gopi Sunder	Haricharan
2012	Karmayogi	"Malar Manjariyil"(Duet)	Ouseppachan	Ranjith Govind
2012	Karmayogi	"Malar Manjariyil"(Female)	Ouseppachan	Solo
2011	Traffic	"Unaroo Mizhiyazhake"	Mejo Joseph	Solo
2010	Oru Small Family	"Swantham Swantham"	M. Jayachandran	Vijay Yesudas
2010	Vandae Maatharam	"Vandae Maatharam"	D. Imman	D Imman, Vijay Yesudas, Krish, Benny Dayal, Haricharan, Harish Raghavendra, Mathangi, Pop Shalini, Srilekha Parthasarathy, Suchithra, Karthik
2009	Utharaswayamvaram	"Mallike Mallike"	M. Jayachandran	Vijay Yesudas
2005	Iniyennum	"Oh Priyane"	M. Jayachandran	Solo
2004	Akale	"Pravukal"	M. Jayachandran	Solo
2003	Thilakkam	"Enna Thavam Seythaney"	Kaithapram Viswanathan Namboothiri	Baby Nimisha
2002	Valkannadi	"Kukku Kukku"	M Jayachandran	M Jayachandran

== List of Kannada songs ==
Year	Film title	Song title	Composer	Co-singer(s)
2026	Brindavihari	"Radha Radha"	Hesham Abdul Wahab	Sid Sriram
2025	Love OTP	"Sada Nanalle"	Anand Rajavikram	Pancham Jeeva
2025	Devil	"Onde Onde Sala"	B. Ajaneesh Loknath	Kapil Kapilan
2025	Mahavatar Narsimha (D)	"Nannaliruva Praana Nee"	Sam C. S.	Solo
2025	Kannappa (D)	"Love Song"	Stephen Devassy	Haricharan
2025	The Girlfriend (D)	"Oh Thaare"	Hesham Abdul Wahab	Hesham Abdul Wahab, Dheekshith Shetty
2025	The Girlfriend (D)	"Yaav Kadege Kathe"	Hesham Abdul Wahab	Hesham Abdul Wahab
2024	1990's	"Dinagalu Kshanagalu"	E C Maha Raja	Abhishek M R, Vishnu
2024	Krishnam Pranaya Sakhi	"Hey Gagana"	Arjun Janya	Sonu Nigam
2024	Aadujeevitham (D)	"Maanada Tumba"	A. R. Rahman	Vijay Yesudas, Rakshita Suresh
2023	Hi Nanna (D)	"Odiyamma"	Hesham Abdul Wahab	Yazin Nizar, Vishnu Priya
2023	Chikku (D)	"Kanna Baana"	Dhibu Ninan Thomas	Haricharan
2023	Yathabhava	"Jaavane"	Utsav Shrey	
2023	Kushi (D)	"Aradhya"	Hesham Abdul Wahab	Haricharan
2023	Shaakuntalam (D)	"Ruhivanadalondu"	Mani Sharma	Naresh Iyer
2022	Vikrant Rona	"Hey Fakira"	B. Ajaneesh Loknath	Sanjith Hegde, B. Ajaneesh Loknath, Anup Bhandari
2022	Girki	"Kadiyalenu"	Veer Samarth	
2022	By Two Love	"Pogadiro Ranga"	B. Ajaneesh Loknath	Haricharan
2022	Bahukrita Vesham	"Aa As Aleyo"	Vyshak V Bhargav	Solo
2021	Marakkar: Lion of the Arabian Sea (D)	"Manasali"	Ronnie Raphael	Sathya Prakash
2021	Ranam	"Manasare Ninna Nodi"	Ravi Shankar	Vijay Prakash, Hamsika Iyer
2020	Dia	"Soul Of Dia"	B. Ajaneesh Loknath	Sanjith Hegde
2020	Naanu Matthu Gunda	"Kavalodeda"	Karthik Sharma	Arun Kamath
2020	Nanthara	"Cheliyagide"	Rishal Sai	
2019	Geetha	"Kanninda Aagaaga"	Anup Rubens	Sai Charan
2019	Dear Comrade (D)	"Oh Kanasa Kathe"	Justin Prabhakaran	Sathyaprakash
2018	Orange	"Yaaro Yaaro"	S. Thaman	Solo
2018	Bhairava Geetha	"Nee Nanna Bhagavathgeethe"	Ravi Shankar	Vijay Yesudas
2018	Naanu L/O Jaanu	"Bhoomi Achegide Mouna"	Srinath Vijay	Karthik
2017	Manasu Mallige	"Thangaliya Roopa"	Ajay–Atul	Ajay Gogavale
2017	Rogue	"Ghumsudha"	Sunil Kashyap	Solo
2016	Sipaayi	"Nanna Kanasina"	B. Ajaneesh Loknath	Ajaneesh Loknath
2015	Haadi Beedi Love Story	"Yaar Eva Yaak Eva"	C R Bobby	
2014	Ninnindale	"Ninthe Ninthe"	Mani Sharma	Vijay Prakash, Sudhamayi
2014	Tirupathi Express	"Usire Usire Vandisu"	Arjun Janya	K. Kalyan
2013	Gombegala Love	"Premave Jeeva"	Srinath Vijay	
2012	Breaking News	"Sundari Sura Sundari"	Stephen Prayog	Solo
2012	Godfather	"Nannade Shruthi"	A. R. Rahman	Vijay Prakash
2012	Godfather	"Neene Ee Kanna"	A. R. Rahman	Abhay Jodhpurkar
2011	Aata	"Rama Rama"	Sadhu Kokila	Kailash Kher
2011	Aata	"Idhu Love"	Sadhu Kokila	
2011	Gun	"Thaaja Thaaja"	Ronnie Raphael	
2011	Taare	"Kanasu Kandagide"	C R Bobby	Karthik
2010	Gaana Bajaana	"Gundetu Gundetu"	Joshua Sridhar	Benny Dayal
2010	Police Quarters	"Biseyada Suddioneda"	James Vasanthan	Solo
2010	Shourya	"Kaledu Hoythu"	Sadhu Kokila	Solo
2010	Sihigali	"Hele Thangaali"	G R Shankar	Solo
2008	Athmiya	"Maleye Maleye"	Manoj George	Solo
2008	Athmiya	"Aralisu Baa Eega"	Manoj George	Rajesh Krishnan
2008	Inthi Ninna Preethiya	"Madhuravana"	Sadhu Kokila	Solo
2008	Cee Galli	"Yelae"	G. R. Shankar	Kunal Ganjawala
2008	Cee Galli	"Kathegara Yaruvane"	G. R. Shankar	Kunal Ganjawala
2008	Chikkamangalur Chikkamallige	"Ho Vasundara"	K. Kalyan	Priyadharshini Ram
2008	Mast Maja Maadi	"Chori Chori"	PB Balaji	Karthik
2008	Gange Baare Tunge Baare	"Nadhiyaagi"	Sadhu Kokila	Udit Narayan
2008	Hani Hani	"Beda Beda"	S. Chinna	Gurukiran

== List of Marathi songs ==
Year	Film title	Song title	Composer(s)	Co-singer(s)
2015	Baji	"Majha Baji"	Atif Afzal	
2015	Baji	"Shravan Shravan"	Atif Afzal	Atif Afzal
2015	Baji	"Majha Baji"(Unplugged)	Atif Afzal	
2016	Sairat	"Sairat Zaala Ji"	Ajay-Atul	Ajay Gogavale
2022	Lagan	"Sarala"	P Shankaram	Onkarswaroop Bagde
2022	Ti Majhi Prem	"Nighu Gela"	Rajveer Gaangji	

== List of other language songs ==
Year	Film title	Song title	Composer(s)	Co-singer(s)	Language	Notes
2017	Hameer	"Zarmar Varse Mehuliyo"	Keerthi Sagathia	Keerthi Sagathia	Gujarati	
2018	Amizade	"Morachi Paankha"	Rithesh Shridhar	Solo	Konkani	Goa State Award for Best Playback Singer (Female)

== Independent music ==
Year	Song title	Other artists	Language	Notes
2013	Anbin Thooral	Solo	Tamil	Joy of Giving Week (Proceeds to 17000 ft.org)
2013	Sneha Saandvanam	Solo	Malayalam	Joy of Giving Week (Proceeds to 17000 ft.org)
2013	Prema Chinukulu	Solo	Telugu	Joy of Giving Week (Proceeds to 17000 ft.org)
2022	Laali - 1MinMusic	Solo	Telugu	Debut as composer - Instagram #1MinMusic
2025	Vel Maaral	Solo	Tamil	Devotional
2025	Subrahmanya Bhujangam	Solo	Sanskrit	Devotional
2026	Subramanya Trishathi	Solo	Sanskrit	Devotional
2026	Pamban Swamigal Aruliya Bandham	Solo	Tamil	Devotional

=== As featuring artist ===
- Cairo to India - "Rock The Tabla" (Hossam Ramzy, A. R. Rahman) featuring Chinmayi
- Thiruda (Iraj Weeraratne) featuring Chinmayi, Psycho Mantra, Bullet Benjamin
- Butterfly (Shekhar Ravjiani) featuring Chinmayi
- Modhiram Mati Poga (Teejay) featuring Chinmayi
- Ulagam Maranthu (Jude Jeyaraj) featuring Chinmayi
- Tholadivaaram (N. R. Raghunanthan) featuring Chinmayi (DooPaaDoo)
- Yedho Oar Arayil (Gautham Vasudev Menon) featuring Chinmayi, Karthik (DooPaaDoo)
- Suprabatham featuring Chinmayi (DooPaaDoo)
- Vaarthaigal featuring Chinmayi (DooPaaDoo)
- Kadhal Nodiye featuring Chinmayi, Sathya Prakash (DooPaaDoo)
- Inaivom Indrae (Jerard Felix) featuring Chinmayi
- Spirit of Chennai (C Girinadh)
- Nee Venakale Nadichi (Saurabh-Durgesh) with Chinmayi
- Mandhira Kannile (Saurabh-Durgesh) with Chinmayi
- Naino Ki Aarziyaan (Saurabh-Durgesh) with Chinmayi
- Vetrumai Pazhagu (Jerard Felix) with Chinmayi, Sunitha Sarathy, Benny Dayal, Rahul Nambiar and Sathya Prakash
- O Jaana (Nilesh Khandale) with Chinmayi and Shahid Mallya
- Yezhunthu Vaa (Shashaa Tirupati) with Chinmayi
- Venal Kaalam Etho Konil (Naveen Anandh) with Chinmayi
- Pesu (B. Babushankar) with Chinmayi, Benny Dayal, Sunitha Sarathy, Blaaze, Mugen Rao, Madhumitha Babushankar, Avaneesh Babushankar
- Kunguma Poove (Flute Navin) with Chinmayi
- Nithirai Nila (Mathews Pulickan) with Chinmayi and Anirudh Ravichander
- Raya (Sagar Janardhan) with Chinmayi
- Crazy 96 (Karthik Venkatesh) with Chinmayi and Santhosh Venky
- Mayakural Ondru Ketkuthey (Baiju Jacob) with Chinmayi and Pradeep Kumar
- Pesaamal Pesum Mounangal (E R Ram Kumar) with Chinmayi and Haricharan
- Pada Pada (Dennis Norton) with Chinmayi, Lyrics by Krishna Kanth, Starring Anupama Parameswaran
- Varugalayo (Baiju Jacob) with Chinmayi, Lyrics by Akshyaa Dinesh, Record Label - Rancho PQ Music
- Tumhari Mohabbat (Javed-Mohsin) with Chinmayi Sripada and Stebin Ben feat. Parth Samthaan and Surbhi Chandna, Record Label - DRJ Records
- Sajle Re Tujhyachsathi (Amrutosh Sunil Karanjkar) with Chinmayi Sripada and Jasraj Joshi
- Mehandhiya (Santhosh Dhayanidhi) with Chinmayi and Sarthak Kalyani, Record Label - VYRL South
- Vyah Naio Karna (Dhrruv Dhalla) with Chinmayi
- Kani Pelli Chesukonu (Dhrruv Dhalla) with Chinmayi
- Povom Naanum Neeyum (Anto Mathew) with Chinmayi
- Ponnavani Varavaay - Onam Song (Sabeesh George) with Chinmayi
- Laila Majnu (Jubair Muhammed) with Chinmayi
- Murugan Varam (C. Sathya) with Chinmayi and Rajhesh Vaidhya

=== Videography ===
- Semmozhiyaana Thamizh Mozhiyaam by A. R. Rahman
- Thiruda (Iraj Weeraratne) featuring Chinmayi, Psycho Mantra, Bullet Benjamin
- Inaivom Indrae (Jerard Felix) featuring Chinmayi
- Kannula Munde - Lyric Video from Sahasam Swasaga Sagipo by A. R. Rahman
- Mayya Mayya by Chinmayi
- Yezhunthu Vaa (Shashaa Tirupati) with Chinmayi
- Venal Kaalam Etho Konil (Naveen Anandh) with Chinmayi
- Pesu - Talk to Me (B. Babushankar) with Chinmayi, Benny Dayal, Sunitha Sarathy, Blaaze, Mugen Rao, Madhumitha Babushankar, Avaneesh Babushankar
- Kunguma Poove (Flute Navin) with Chinmayi
- Kan Moodudho (feat. Tharun Sekar) by Sean Roldan for Coke Studio Tamil - Chinmayi x John Pradeep JL

== Jingles and advertisements ==
Chinmayi has sung in various jingles and also dubbed for several artists in advertisements. She continues to extensively dub and sing for AD filmmaker and Musician Babushankar Balasubramanian in Tamil, Telugu, Kannada and Malayalam advertisements. Additionally, she has dubbed in Hindi, Odia, and Bengali languages.

Some of the Jingles in which she has sung:

- The Chennai Silks (Vivaha Pattu) – Pattu Katti Poo Mudikka
- Sri Ganapathy Silks
- Maa Fruit Drink Advertisement – Anbukku
- Kalyan Jewellers – Humming (Composed by G. V. Prakash)
- Toyota Etios Theme Song – Pehli Baar (Composed by A. R. Rahman)
- RuPay Debit Card – Ghadi Ke Do Kaaton
- Prince Jewellery Ad – Singara Nagaiyum (Tamil and Kannada) / Abharana Pravayam (Malayalam)
- Prince Jewellery – Idhu Enna Maayam (Tamil) / Idhu Maayajalam (Malayalam)
- Jayalakshmi Silks – Madhura Swapnanghal (New Version)
- 7UP – Payanigalin
- Sri Devi Textiles
- Tata Gold Plus Ad
- Vajee Care
- Pepsi Ad - Kannathil Muthamittal
- Nalli Silks Ad
- Textile India Ad
- Spinz Talc Ad
- Nyle Ad
- Suryan FM Title song – Kuyilin Baashaiyai
- Ragamalika Title Song
- Vencobb Chicken Ad – Tamil/Telugu
- JCS Jewel Creation's - Imaiye
- Saravana Stores
- Vivaaha: Deivigam, The Chennai Silks - Inaiyum
- Sunland Oil
- DooPaaDoo.com
- Colgate Active Salt – Uppin Gynanam
- Sudha Hospitals – Aararo
- Sree Kumaran Thanga Maligai
- GRB Ghee – Manal Manalaai Nei Irundhaal
- GRB Masala – Illi Swalpa, Alli Innu Swalpa (Kannada)
- GRB Ghee – Oorukku Oru Suvai
- GRB Ghee – Prathi Ooriki Oko Ruchi

Chinmayi has lent her voice for Samantha Ruth Prabhu in most of her AD Films in both Tamil and Telugu. She has also dubbed for Sneha in her series of AD Films for Super Saravana Stores and GRT Jewellers - Golden Eleven Plan. Other works include dubbing for actress Anushka Shetty in the Head and Shoulders TVC and Sri Lakshmi Jewellery, for Trisha in a series of TVCs for Pothys (Samudrika Pattu), Lazza Ice Cream, Gokul Santol (Soap and Powder), and GRT Jewellers, for Srushti Dange in the GRT - Flexi Gold Plan TVC, for Sania Mirza in the Vencobb Chicken TVC, for multiple artists in a series of ADs for Estancia, Sabena Citrus Plus, Sree Gold Dhall, Gold Winner, Anjali Oil, Hrithay Oil and for Jyotika in one of the Sakthi Masala ADs.

She has also been featured in advertisements for Dheepam Oil (M S Subbulakshmi Edition) in all 4 South Indian Languages.

== Title songs for television ==
Chinmayi has also sung title songs for various television serials and shows. She first sang the title song of Anbulla Snehithiye, after she was introduced to the serial director by director Mani Ratnam. The list of serials she has sung for:

Year	Song	Serial Title	Language
2001	Snehidi	Anbulla Snehidiye	Tamil
2002	Marakka Mudiyuma	Marakka Mudiyuma	Tamil
2006-2009	Title Song	Ben 10	Tamil, Telugu
2007	Natakam	Natakam	Telugu
2007	Paathaigal	Paathaigal	Tamil
2007	Sarathakam	Sarathakam	Telugu
2007	Pratigatana	Pratigatana	Telugu
2008	Naana	Naana	Telugu
2008	Vaaram	Vaaram	Tamil
2008	Kanavugal	Kanavugal	Tamil
2011	Maraka	Maraka Mudiyuma	Tamil
2011	Marum Yugangal	Simran Thirai	Tamil and Telugu
2013	Ganga	Ganga Gayathri	Tamil
2013	Oru Siru Siru	Idhayam Thotta Kathigal	Tamil
2013	Oru Nathi	Saratha	Tamil
2013	Pookkal Adhu	Appa	Tamil
2013	Thooradha	Meera	Tamil
2014	All songs	Ramayanam	Tamil
2014	Uyire Uyirin	Kanmaniye	Tamil
2014	Kodi Mullai	Kodi Mullai	Tamil
2015	Mullai Malli	Aadhira	Tamil
2015	Akaya Ellai Neeye	Keladi Kanmani	Tamil
2020	Muta kannu	Anbe Vaa	Tamil
2022	Anbe Meera	Meera	Tamil
2024	Varamaga vanthale	Punitha	Tamil
2024	Hey Anamika	Anamika	Tamil
