= List of accolades received by Guru (2007 film) =

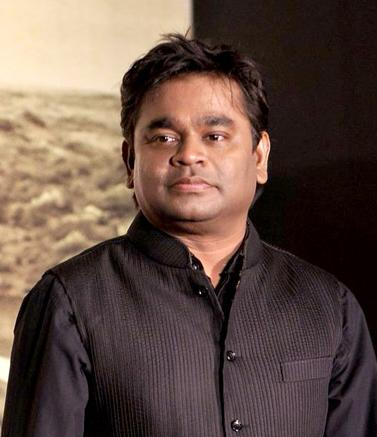
- A. R. Rahman's music for Guru garnered him several awards and nominations
Accolades
Award	Won	Nominated
Filmfare Awards	5	14
International Indian Film Academy Awards	4	12
Producers Guild Film Awards	3	18
Screen Awards	3	14
Stardust Awards	0	7
V. Shantaram Awards	3	3
Zee Cine Awards	3	10
- Total number of awards and nominations (Note: Awards in certain categories do not have prior nominations and only winners are announced by the jury. For simplification and to avoid errors, each award in this list has been presumed to have had a prior nomination.)
Totals	21	78
- References

Guru is a 2007 Indian drama film directed and co-written by Mani Ratnam. It was produced by Mani Ratnam and his brother G. Srinivasan under their production company, Madras Talkies. The film features Abhishek Bachchan, Aishwarya Rai, Madhavan, Vidya Balan, Arya Babbar, and Mithun Chakraborty in the leading roles. The film also has Mallika Sherawat in a guest appearance. The soundtrack and score were composed by A. R. Rahman, while the cinematography was handled by Rajiv Menon and editing done by A. Sreekar Prasad. The general consensus is that this film is largely based on the life of one of India's biggest industrial tycoons, Dhirubhai Ambani, but also has elements of other stories and businessmen.

Guru was released on 12 January 2007 and grossed ₹830.7 million. The film garnered awards and nominations in several categories, with particular praise for its direction, music, cinematography, and for the lead performances (Abhishek and Aishwarya). The film won 19 awards from 76 nominations. The film was premiered in the Tous Les Cinemas du Monde (World Cinema) section of 2007 Cannes Film Festival.

At the 53rd Filmfare Awards, Guru was nominated in fourteen categories, winning Best Music Director and Best Background Score (A. R. Rahman), Best Female Playback Singer (Shreya Ghoshal for "Barso Re"), Best Choreography (Saroj Khan for "Barso Re") and Best Production Design (Samir Chanda). At the 9th IIFA Awards, it received ten nominations and won two, including those for Best Music Director (A. R. Rahman) and Best Female Playback Singer (Shreya Ghoshal for "Barso Re"). Among other wins, the film received three Producers Guild Film Awards from 18 nominations, three Screen Awards from 14 nominations, three V. Shantaram Awards, three Zee Cine Awards from 10 nominations and at the Stardust Awards it was nominated in 7 categories without winning.

== Awards and nominations ==
Award (Note: Awards, festivals and organizations are in Alphabetical order.)	Date of ceremony (Note: Date is linked to the article about the awards held that year, wherever possible.)	Category	Recipient(s)	Result	Ref.
Filmfare Awards	16 February 2008	Best Film	Madras Talkies	Nominated	
Filmfare Awards	16 February 2008	Best Director	Mani Ratnam	Nominated	
Filmfare Awards	16 February 2008	Best Story	Mani Ratnam	Nominated	
Filmfare Awards	16 February 2008	Best Production Design	Samir Chanda	Won	
Filmfare Awards	16 February 2008	Best Costume Design	Ameira Punvani, V. Sai & Aparna Shah	Nominated	
Filmfare Awards	16 February 2008	Best Actor	Abhishek Bachchan	Nominated	
Filmfare Awards	16 February 2008	Best Actress	Aishwarya Rai Bachchan	Nominated	
Filmfare Awards	16 February 2008	Best Supporting Actor	Mithun Chakraborty	Nominated	
Filmfare Awards	16 February 2008	Best Music Director	A. R. Rahman	Won	
Filmfare Awards	16 February 2008	Best Background Score	A. R. Rahman	Won	
Filmfare Awards	16 February 2008	Best Lyricist	Gulzar ("Tere Bina")	Nominated	
Filmfare Awards	16 February 2008	Best Male Playback Singer	A. R. Rahman ("Tere Bina")	Nominated	
Filmfare Awards	16 February 2008	Best Female Playback Singer	Shreya Ghoshal ("Barso Re")	Won	
Filmfare Awards	16 February 2008	Best Choreography	Saroj Khan ("Barso Re")	Won	
International Indian Film Academy Awards	6-8, June 2008	Best Film	Madras Talkies	Nominated	
International Indian Film Academy Awards	6-8, June 2008	Best Director	Mani Ratnam	Nominated	
International Indian Film Academy Awards	6-8, June 2008	Best Story	Mani Ratnam	Nominated	
International Indian Film Academy Awards	6-8, June 2008	Best Actor	Abhishek Bachchan	Nominated	
International Indian Film Academy Awards	6-8, June 2008	Best Acting – Male	Abhishek Bachchan	Won	
International Indian Film Academy Awards	6-8, June 2008	Best Actress	Aishwarya Rai Bachchan	Nominated	
International Indian Film Academy Awards	6-8, June 2008	Best Acting – Female	Aishwarya Rai Bachchan	Won	
International Indian Film Academy Awards	6-8, June 2008	Best Supporting Actor	Mithun Chakraborty	Nominated	
International Indian Film Academy Awards	6-8, June 2008	Best Supporting Actress	Vidya Balan	Nominated	
International Indian Film Academy Awards	6-8, June 2008	Best Music Director	A. R. Rahman	Won	
International Indian Film Academy Awards	6-8, June 2008	Best Lyricist	Gulzar ("Tere Bina")	Nominated	
International Indian Film Academy Awards	6-8, June 2008	Best Female Playback Singer	Shreya Ghoshal ("Barso Re")	Won	
Producers Guild Film Awards (Note: Previously known as Apsara Film & Television Producers Guild Awards.)	30 March 2008	Best Film	Madras Talkies	Nominated	
Producers Guild Film Awards	30 March 2008	Best Director	Mani Ratnam	Nominated	
Producers Guild Film Awards	30 March 2008	Best Screenplay	Mani Ratnam	Nominated	
Producers Guild Film Awards	30 March 2008	Best Dialogue	Vijay Krishna Acharya	Nominated	
Producers Guild Film Awards	30 March 2008	Best Art Director	Samir Chanda	Nominated	
Producers Guild Film Awards	30 March 2008	Best Costume Design	Ameira Punvani, V. Sai & Aparna Shah	Nominated	
Producers Guild Film Awards	30 March 2008	Best Cinematography	Rajiv Menon	Won	
Producers Guild Film Awards	30 March 2008	Best Actor in a Leading Role	Abhishek Bachchan	Nominated	
Producers Guild Film Awards	30 March 2008	Best Actress in a Leading Role	Aishwarya Rai Bachchan	Nominated	
Producers Guild Film Awards	30 March 2008	Best Actor in a Supporting Role	Mithun Chakraborty	Nominated	
Producers Guild Film Awards	30 March 2008	Best Music Director	A. R. Rahman	Nominated	
Producers Guild Film Awards	30 March 2008	Best Lyricist	Gulzar ("Tere Bina")	Won	
Producers Guild Film Awards	30 March 2008	Best Female Playback Singer	Shreya Ghoshal ("Barso Re")	Won	
Producers Guild Film Awards	30 March 2008	Best Choreography	Brinda ("Mayya")	Nominated	
Producers Guild Film Awards	30 March 2008	Best Re-Recording	H. Sridhar	Nominated	
Producers Guild Film Awards	30 March 2008	Best Sound Recording	H. Sridhar, Rakesh Ranjan & Jagmohan Anand	Nominated	
Producers Guild Film Awards	30 March 2008	Best Editing	A. Sreekar Prasad	Nominated	
Producers Guild Film Awards	30 March 2008	Best Special Effects	Prime Focus & Prasad EFX	Nominated	
Screen Awards	10 January 2008	Best Film	Madras Talkies	Nominated	
Screen Awards	10 January 2008	Best Director	Mani Ratnam	Nominated	
Screen Awards	10 January 2008	Best Dialogue	Vijay Krishna Acharya	Nominated	
Screen Awards	10 January 2008	Best Art Direction	Sabu Cyril	Nominated	
Screen Awards	10 January 2008	Best Cinematography	Rajiv Menon	Nominated	
Screen Awards	10 January 2008	Best Actor	Abhishek Bachchan	Nominated	
Screen Awards	10 January 2008	Best Actress	Aishwarya Rai Bachchan	Nominated	
Screen Awards	10 January 2008	Best Supporting Actor	Mithun Chakraborty	Nominated	
Screen Awards	10 January 2008	Best Music Director	A. R. Rahman	Won	
Screen Awards	10 January 2008	Best Background Score	A. R. Rahman	Won	
Screen Awards	10 January 2008	Best Female Playback Singer	Shreya Ghoshal ("Barso Re")	Won	
Screen Awards	10 January 2008	Best Female Playback Singer	Chinmayi ("Tere Bina")	Nominated	
Screen Awards	10 January 2008	Best Choreography	Saroj Khan ("Barso Re")	Nominated	
Screen Awards	10 January 2008	Best Sound Design	H. Sridhar	Nominated	
Stardust Awards	25 January 2008	Best Film	Madras Talkies	Nominated	
Stardust Awards	25 January 2008	Dream Director	Mani Ratnam	Nominated	
Stardust Awards	25 January 2008	Actor of the Year – Male	Abhishek Bachchan	Nominated	
Stardust Awards	25 January 2008	Actor of the Year – Female	Aishwarya Rai Bachchan	Nominated	
Stardust Awards	25 January 2008	Best Supporting Actor	Mithun Chakraborty	Nominated	
Stardust Awards	25 January 2008	Best Supporting Actress	Vidya Balan	Nominated	
Stardust Awards	25 January 2008	New Musical Sensation – Female	Maryem Tollar ("Mayya")	Nominated	
V. Shantaram Awards	19 November 2007	Best Director	Mani Ratnam	Won	
V. Shantaram Awards	19 November 2007	Best Cinematography	Rajiv Menon	Won	
V. Shantaram Awards	19 November 2007	Best Music Director	A. R. Rahman	Won	
Zee Cine Awards	26 April 2008	Best Film	Madras Talkies	Nominated	
Zee Cine Awards	26 April 2008	Best Director	Mani Ratnam	Nominated	
Zee Cine Awards	26 April 2008	Best Actor – Male	Abhishek Bachchan	Nominated	
Zee Cine Awards	26 April 2008	Best Actor – Female	Aishwarya Rai Bachchan	Nominated	
Zee Cine Awards	26 April 2008	Best Actor in a Supporting Role – Male	Mithun Chakraborty	Nominated	
Zee Cine Awards	26 April 2008	Best Music Director	A. R. Rahman	Won	
Zee Cine Awards	26 April 2008	Best Background Score	A. R. Rahman	Won	
Zee Cine Awards	26 April 2008	Best Lyricist	Gulzar ("Tere Bina")	Nominated	
Zee Cine Awards	26 April 2008	Best Playback Singer – Female	Shreya Ghoshal ("Barso Re")	Won	
Zee Cine Awards	26 April 2008	Most Popular Track Of The Year	"Barso Re"	Nominated	

== See also ==
- List of Bollywood films of 2007
