= Let It Rain =

Let It Rain may refer to:

== Films ==
- Let It Rain (1927 film), featuring Boris Karloff
- Let It Rain (2008 film), a French film

== Music ==
=== Albums ===
- Let It Rain (Montell Jordan album), 2008
- Let It Rain (Shirley Myers album), 1997
- Let It Rain (Tracy Chapman album), 2002

=== Songs ===
- "Let It Rain" (Eric Clapton song), 1972
- "Let It Rain" (East 17 song), 1995
- "Let It Rain" (Amanda Marshall song), 1995
- "Let It Rain" (Mark Chesnutt song), 1996
- "Let It Rain" (Shirley Myers song), 1997
- "Let It Rain" (BWO song), 2007
- "Let It Rain" (David Nail song), 2011
- "Let It Rain" (Tinchy Stryder song), 2011
- "Let It Rain" (Eliza Doolittle song), 2013
- "Let It Rain (Is There Anybody)", a song by Crowder featuring Mandisa, 2010
- "Let It Rain", a song by The Boys (English band), 1981
- "Let It Rain", a song by Billy Joe Royal from his 1987 album The Royal Treatment
- "Let It Rain", a song by Girls' Generation from their 2011 Japanese album Girls' Generation
- "Let It Rain", a song by Gotthard from their 1998 album Open
- "Let It Rain", a song by Heavy D & the Boyz from their 1991 album Peaceful Journey
- "Let It Rain", a song by Jennifer Paige from her 1998 album Jennifer Paige
- "Let It Rain", a song by JoJo from her 2006 album The High Road
- "Let it Rain", a song by Jon Bon Jovi and Luciano Pavarotti from the album Pavarotti & Friends for the Children of Liberia
- "Let It Rain", a song by Jordin Sparks from her 2009 album Battlefield
- "Let It Rain", a song by Kris Allen from his 2009 album Kris Allen
- "Let It Rain", a song by Leona Lewis from her 2009 single "Happy"
- "Let It Rain", a song by Michael W. Smith from his 2001 album Worship
- "Let It Rain", a song by Nana from his 1997 album Nana
- "Let It Rain", a song by OK Go from their 2005 album Oh No
- "Let It Rain", a song by Sarah Brightman from her 2009 album Symphony
- "Let It Rain", a song by Sybil from Doin' It Now!
- "Let It Rain", a song by Take That performed on their 2006 Ultimate Tour
- "Let It Rain", a song by UFO from their 1982 album Mechanix
- "Let It Rain", a song by 4 Strings that was released as a charting single in 2003
- "Let It Rain", a song from My Little Pony: Equestria Girls
- "Barso Re" (transl. Let It Rain), a song by A. R. Rahman, Shreya Ghoshal and Uday Mazumdar from the 2007 Indian film Guru

== See also ==
- Make It Rain (disambiguation)
