= Make It Rain =

Make It Rain may refer to:

== Music ==
- "Make It Rain" (Fat Joe song), 2006
- "Make It Rain" (Foy Vance song), a song covered by Ed Sheeran in 2014
- "Make It Rain" (Pop Smoke song), 2020
- "Make It Rain" (Travis Porter song), 2010
- "Make It Rain", a 1969 song by Billy Mize
- "Make It Rain", a 1970 song by Orange Bicycle
- "Make It Rain", a 2010 single by Travis Porter from From Day 1
- "Make It Rain", a song by Tom Waits from Real Gone
- "Barso Re" (transl. Make It Rain), a song by A. R. Rahman, Shreya Ghoshal and Uday Mazumdar from the 2007 Indian film Guru

== Other uses ==
- Make It Rain: The Love of Money, a 2014 mobile game by Space Inch
- Make It Rain, the signature move of the Pokémon species Gholdengo

== See also ==
- Let It Rain (disambiguation)
- Make It Reign (disambiguation)
- Rainmaking, the idea of a person who can "make it rain"
- Rainmaker (in business), a business rainmaker is a person, said to magically bring new business to a firm
