= Guru (soundtrack) =

Soundtrack album by A R Rahman
- Released: 19 November 2006 (India)
- Recorded: 2006; Panchathan Record Inn, AM Studios
- Genre: Feature film soundtrack
- Length: 39:22
- Labels: Sony Music India (Hindi & Tamil); Aditya Music (Telugu)
- Producer: A. R. Rahman

A R Rahman chronology
Varalaru (2006)	Guru (2006)	Sajni (2007)

Singles from Guru
- 1. "Barso Re" Released: 2007; 2. "Tere Bina" Released: 19 November 2006; 3. "Mayya" Released: 20 November 2006

Professional ratings
Review scores
Source	Rating
Planet Bollywood	08/10 stars

Guru is the soundtrack to the 2007 film directed by Mani Ratnam. The soundtrack was released on 19 November 2006. The film's music is composed by A. R. Rahman with lyrics provided by Gulzar. The lyrics for the Tamil and Telugu versions were written by Vairamuthu and Veturi, respectively.

== Overview ==
Like many of Rahman's soundtracks, Guru comes with a variety of songs. The songs vary in their musical style, from the Turkish inspired "Mayya Mayya" to the folk-ish "Ek Lo Ek Muft", the love ballad Tere Bina and rain-themed song, "Barso Re".

The song Tere Bina is dedicated to the memory of Pakistani qawwali singer Ustad Nusrat Fateh Ali Khan since it was the 10th anniversary of his death. Gulzar also adapted the lyrics of "Ay Hairathe" from the lyrics of Amir Khushroo's "Ay Sarbathe Aashiqui". Rahman personally trained Egyptian singer Maryem Tollar to sing "Mayya Mayya", a song which Rahman wrote while on Hajj in Makkah. After he heard a man near a river who was continually repeating "maya maya maya" (water in Arabic), he told Gulzar to incorporate the word into the tune he had created while touring in Toronto, Ontario, Canada.

The soundtrack has proved a success, staying at the number one spot thirteen weeks after its release, despite receiving stiff competition from other albums released.

The song "Shauk Hai" has been used in the film, but was not released on the audio CD.

The soundtrack release of Guru also incorporated bonus tracks from Rahman's other albums Rang De Basanti, Lagaan, Kisna, Zubeidaa and Meenaxi.

== Track listing ==
=== Hindi (Original) ===
All lyrics are written by Gulzar.

Track Listing
No.	Title	Singer(s)	Length
1.	"Ek Lo Ek Muft"	Bappi Lahari & K. S. Chithra	4:46
2.	"Tere Bina"	A. R. Rahman, Chinmayi, Murtuza Khan & Qadir Khan	5:09
3.	"Jaage Hain"	K.S.Chithra, A. R. Rahman & Madras Choral Group	6:33
4.	"Ey Hairathe"	Hariharan, Alka Yagnik & A. R. Rahman	6:09
5.	"Mayya"	Maryem Tollar, Chinmayi & Keerthi Sagathia	6:02
6.	"Baazi Laga"	Udit Narayan, Madhushree, Shweta Mohan & Bhargavi Pillai	4:59
7.	"Barso Re"	Shreya Ghoshal & Uday Mazumdar	5:29
8.	"Shaouk Hai"	Sowmya Raoh	4:32
9.	"Guru Theme Music"	Chorus	2:43

=== Tamil Version ===
All lyrics are written by Vairamuthu.

Track Listing
No.	Title	Singer(s)	Length
1.	"Rendu Maangai (Jodi Jodi)"	S. P. Balasubrahmanyam & K.S. Chithra	4:46
2.	"Aaruyire"	A. R. Rahman, Chinmayi, Murtuza Khan, Qadir Khan	5:09
3.	"Orey Kanaa"	A. R. Rahman, K. S. Chithra & Madras Choral Group	6:33
4.	"Ey Maanburu Mangaiye"	Srinivas, Sujatha Mohan & A. R. Rahman	6:09
5.	"Mayya Mayya"	Chinmayi, Maryem Tollar & Keerthi Sagathia	6:02
6.	"Paisa Paisa"	Karthik & Madhushree	4:56
7.	"Ven Megham (Nanare)"	Shreya Ghoshal & Uday Mazumdar	5:29
8.	"Kan Vizhithal Vennilavu"	Priya Himesh	3:46
9.	"Guru Theme Music"	Chorus	2:43

=== Gurukanth - (Telugu Version) ===
All lyrics are written by Veturi Sundararama Murthy.

Track Listing
No.	Title	Singer(s)	Length
1.	"Jodi Cheseyi"	S. P. Balasubrahmanyam & K.S. Chithra	4:46
2.	"Nuvvu Leka"	A. R. Rahman, Chinmayi, Murtuza Khan & Qadir Khan	5:09
3.	"Innalla"	K. S. Chithra, A. R. Rahman & Madras Choral Group	6:33
4.	"Ey Hayillo"	Hariharan, Sujatha Mohan, A. R. Rahman & Mohammed Aslam	6:09
5.	"Mayya Mayya"	Chinmayi, Maryem Tollar & Keerthi Sagathia	6:02
6.	"Adeyyata"	Karthik & Madhushree	4:59
7.	"Merisisndi Megham"	Shreya Ghoshal & Uday Mazumdar	5:29
8.	"Guru Theme Music"	Chorus	2:43

== Awards ==
Filmfare Awards

- Won, Best Music Direction – A. R. Rahman
- Won, Best Female Playback – Shreya Ghoshal for Barso Re
- Nominated, Best Male Playback – A. R. Rahman for Tere Bina
- Nominated, Best Lyrics – Gulzar

Star Screen Awards

- Won, Best Music Direction – A. R. Rahman
- Won, Best Background Score – A. R. Rahman
- Won, Best Female Playback – Shreya Ghoshal for Barso Re
- Nominated, Best Female Playback – Chinmayi for Tere Bina

IIFA Awards

- Won, Best Music Direction – A. R. Rahman
- Won, Best Female Playback – Shreya Ghoshal for Barso Re
- Nominated, Best Lyrics – Gulzar

Zee Cine Awards

- Won, Best Music Direction – A. R. Rahman
- Won, Best Female Playback – Shreya Ghoshal for Barso Re
- Nominated, Best Lyrics – Gulzar
