= Vattakhanal =

Indian Tamil-language action drama film

- Theatrical release poster
- Directed by: Pithak Pugazhenthi
- Produced by: A. Mathiyazhagan; M. Veerammal
- Starring: Dhruvan M Meenakshi Govindarajan; R. K. Suresh
- Cinematography: M. A. Anand
- Edited by: V. J. Sabu Joseph
- Music by: Maris Vijay
- Production companies: MPR Films; Skyline Cinemas
- Release date: 7 November 2025
- Country: India
- Language: Tamil

Vattakhanal (transl. Circular canal) is a 2025 Indian Tamil-language action drama film directed by Pithak Pugazhenthi and produced by A. Mathiyazhagan,M. Veerammal and Co Produced by R M Rajesh.The film features Dhruvan M, Meenakshi Govindarajan, and R. K. Suresh in the lead roles.

== Cast ==
- Dhruvan Mano as Sathya
- Meenakshi Govindarajan as Varsha
- R. K. Suresh as Kathiravan
- Mano as Jeffi
- Vinodhini
- Aari Arujunan
- Aadukalam Naren as Chellapandi
- Vidya Pradeep as Radha
- KPY Sharath
- Kabali Vishwanth

== Production ==
The film is directed by Pithak Pugazhenthi and produced by A. Mathiyazhagan and M. Veerammal under the banner of MPR Films and Skyline Cinemas. The music is composed by Maris Vijay, with cinematography by M A Anand and edited by V. J. Sabu Joseph.

== Reception ==
Maalai Malar critic stated that "based on the story of intoxicating mushrooms." Dinamalar critic rated two out of five star.

Dinakaran critic stated that "Then, the guilt of being loyal to the adoptive father is a good twist."
