= Make It Reign =

Make it Reign may refer to:

- Make It Reign (album) by American rap duo Lord Tariq and Peter Gunz 1998
- "Make it Reign" (Face Off), 2013 episode of Face Off
- "Make it Reign" (Supergirl), 2017 episode of Supergirl

== See also ==
- Make It Rain (disambiguation)
