= Vingyani =

2014 Indian film by Paarthi

- Directed by: Paarthi
- Written by: R. K. Vidhyadharan; Paarthi
- Produced by: Paarthi
- Starring: Paarthi; Meera Jasmine; Vivek
- Cinematography: Aravind Kamalanathan
- Edited by: Maruthi Krish
- Music by: Maris Vijay
- Production company: Paarthis Pictures Limited
- Release date: 28 November 2014
- Country: India
- Language: Tamil

Vingyani (transl. Scientist) is a 2014 Tamil-language science fiction film written, produced and directed by Paarthi, who also features in the lead role. The film also features Meera Jasmine and Vivek in other pivotal roles, while Sanjana Singh and Mayilswamy appear in further supporting roles. Featuring music composed by Maris Vijay, the film was released on 28 November 2014.

== Cast ==
- Paarthi as Ramakrishnan
- Meera Jasmine as Kaveri
- Vivek
- Devadarshini
- Sanjana Singh
- Mayilswamy
- Bose Venkat
- Jasper
- Bala Singh
- Thalaivasal Vijay
- Sriranjani
- Boys Rajan

== Production ==
The film was written and directed by newcomer Paarthi, who also featured in the film as lead role and served as the producer. Paarthi is a science graduate from the A C College of Technology, and then had pursued his higher studies at the Indian Institute of Science, graduating with a Doctorate in Aerospace Engineering. His work in science and his short stint as a scientist at NASA prompted him to work on his first film script. Actress Meera Jasmine revealed that she signed the film, despite its rookie technical team, because she was impressed with the script.

== Soundtrack ==
The soundtrack was composed by Maris Vijay.

- "Kondaiya Aati" - Maris Vijay, Padmalatha
- "Un Paarvai Arugil" - Maris Vijay, Chinmayi Sripaada
- "Kadhavai Saathadi" - Maris Vijay, Mc. V-Key, Mc. Ak
- "X Chromosome Y Chromosome" - Maris Vijay, Sunitha Sarathy
- "Pullum Maranum" - Maris Vijay, Kamalaja Rajagopal
- "Tamizhan Perumai" - Maris Vijay
- "Golu Malu" - Maris Vijay
- "Sil Endru Odum Aaru" - Maris Vijay, Kamalaja Rajagopal
- "Where Is The Will" - Maris Vijay, Murugan Reigo

== Release ==
A reviewer from The Hindu stated it was "a badly made film" with "simply lazy writing, and no, the message-oriented nature of the film doesn’t ameliorate it". Malini Mannath of The New Indian Express wrote that "At the most, the film can be considered as a debutante’s ambitious effort to make a film different from the routine ones".
