= Maris Vijay =

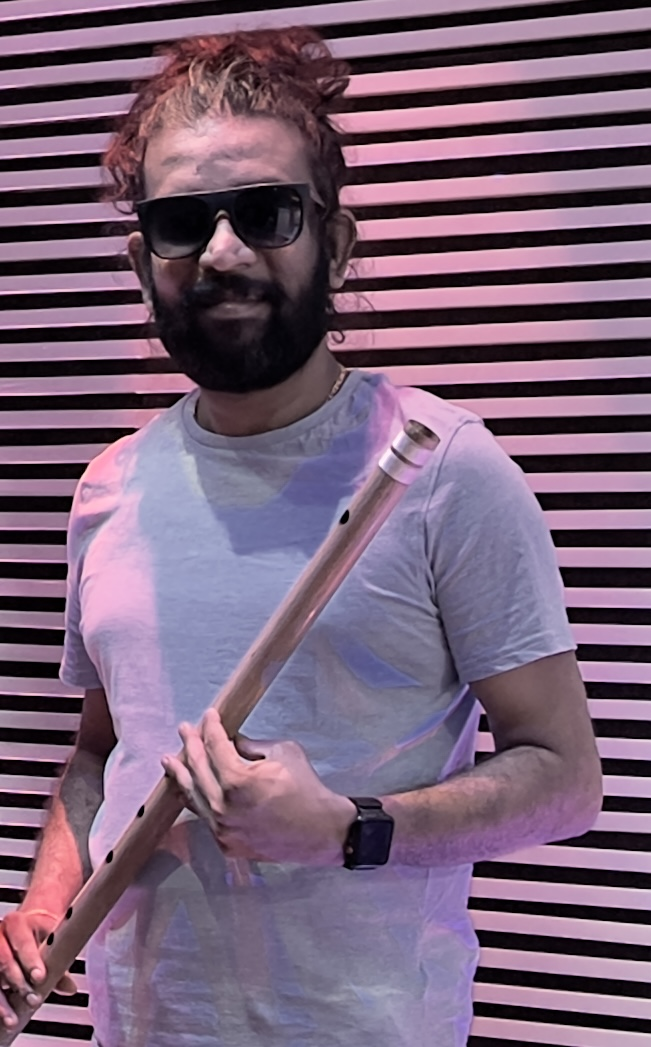

Background information
- Born: Chennai, Tamil Nadu, India
- Occupations: film composer, singer

Maris Vijay is a film composer and singer, who works in Tamil and Hindi films and independent music.

== Film career ==
Maris Vijay started his film career in 2013 when he began Miracle Waves Studio, a recording and mixing studio. He was approached to compose the score and soundtrack for his Tamil film, Vingyani. Maris debuted as a film composer from this film in 2014.

In 2018, Maris sung a song in Villavan. Maris received Nation's Icon Award in 2022.

In 2025, Vijay also worked in a Tamil film Vattakhanal.

== Discography ==
=== Films and television ===
- Vingyani (2014) (Tamil)
- Villavan: The Vigilante (2018) (Tamil), as actor and composer
- Dans La Maison Du Capitaine (2018) (French)
- Mangalya Dosham (2020; Tamil TV series)
- Drop of Water (2021; Hindi short film)
- Vattakhanal (2025) Tamil Film

=== Independent albums ===
- Tere Bina Dil (2002)
- Abdul Kalam Anthem is an album of original compositions released for Abdul Kalam (2015) in Sun Music & M-Muzik Official
- 14 for teen (2008)
- The last moment (2021)
- Pogadhe Nee Pogadhe (2021)

=== EPs and singles ===
- Ticket Chahiye Mujhko (2024)
- Jai Ho Kalam (feat. Savaniee Ravindrra)
- Sab Jhoote Hai (feat. Hrishikesh Ranade)
- Sab Jhoote Hai (feat. Savaniee Ravindrra)
- Allithantha Boomi (feat. K.Suthakaran, Sinmaye Sivakumar, Balaji Sri & Georginaa Mathew)
- Enndhan
- Kadhavai Sathadi
- Somewhere I Lost You
