= Udhai Mazumdar =

Udhai/Udai Mazumdar
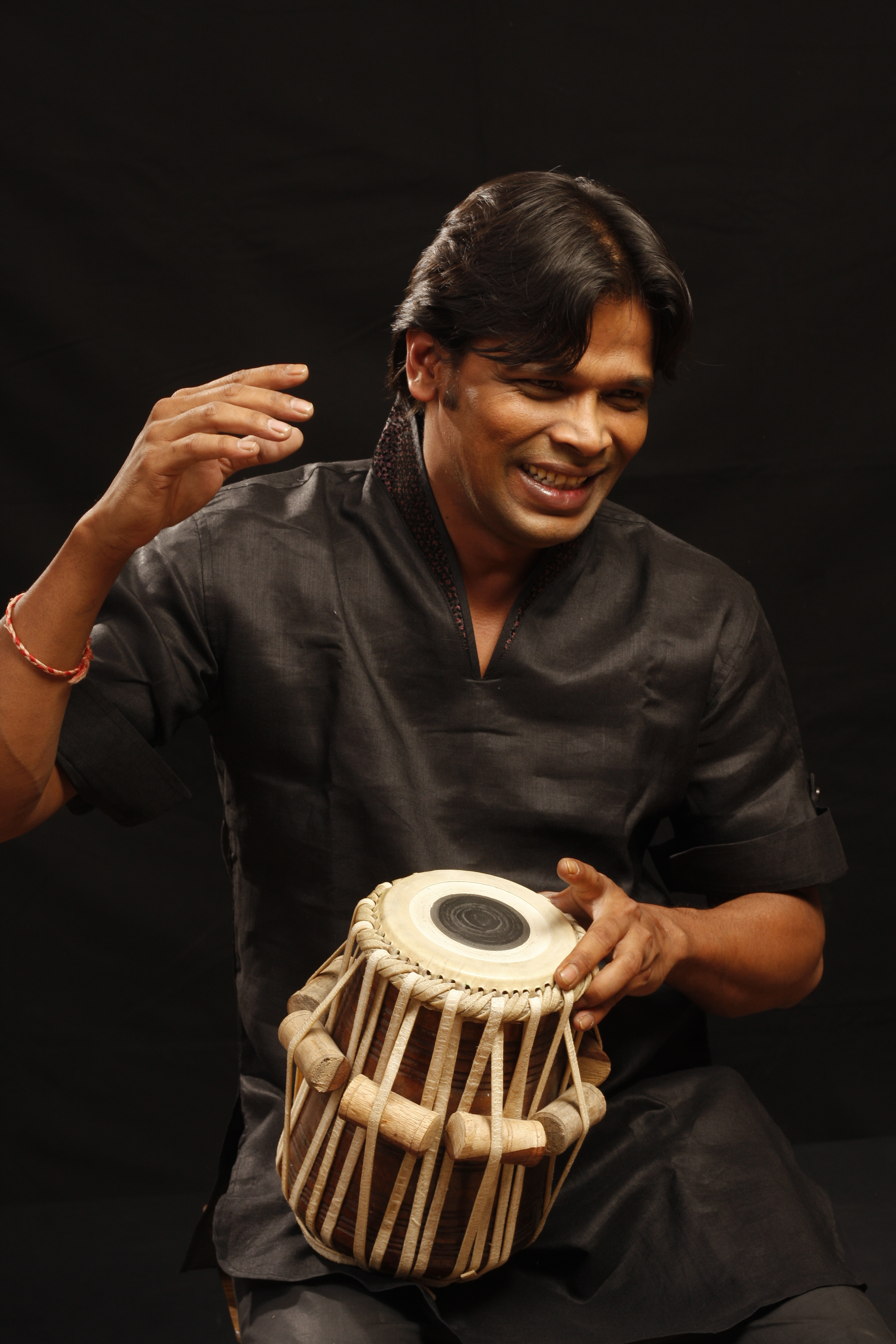

Background information
- Born: March 28, 1970 (age 55); Allahabad, Uttar Pradesh
- Origin: India
- Genres: Indian classical music
- Occupations: Musician and composer
- Instrument: Tabla
- Website: www.udhaimazumdar.com

Udhai Mazumdar (born March 28, 1970) is an Indian tabla player, music producer and composer.

== Early life ==
Mazumdar was born in Allahabad, and started learning tabla and Hindustani vocals at the age of seven. In 1981, he became a disciple of Kaviraj Ashutosh Bhattacharya.

In 1988, Mazumdar went to Delhi and became the disciple of the sitar maestro Ravi Shankar. He lived and learned with him in the age-old tradition of "Guru Shiyha Parampara" (Living with the teacher).

== Career ==
Mazumdar has performed for the Royal Families of Britain and Sweden. He has accompanied Ravi Shankar on occasions. Udai made his presence felt while performing with Zakir Hussain on the eve of the 75th birthday celebration of Ravi Shankar. Udai has broadcast on Radio DRS in Switzerland, BBC TV and Radio France. He has toured extensively across the globe: Durgalal Festival Delhi, The Saptak Festival Ahmedabad, Vasantahabba Festival Bengaluru, International Folk Festival Hungary, Drum Festival Germany, World Music Festival Rome, International Festival for Chernobyl Victims Minsk, festivals for contemporary music in Mongolia, Odessa, Vietnam, Indonesia, etc.

More recently he created a musical based on the 11th century epic Geet Govind by Jayadev, called Geet Govinda – The eternal love song of Krishna, Kabir Tulsi and Us, Singing Strings and Bhaskar - The Rising for which he has also composed and recorded the original music score.

== Personal life ==
Mazumdar was born in a family of musicians. His father, Partho Sarathy Mazumdar, is among the first generation of guitarists in Indian classical music. Udhai is married to Filomena Bianculli. Together, they have one son, Jay Mazumdar and one daughter, Isha Mazumdar.

Mazumdar composes music and teaches students in Basel, Switzerland and New Delhi, India. Some of these performers include Bhaskar Das, Rohan Dasgupta, Piu nandi, and Rupesh Pathak.

== Discography ==
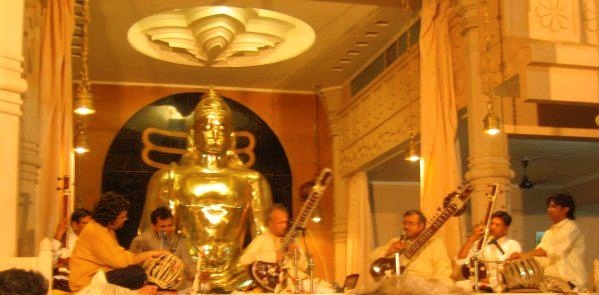
Ravi Shankar, Bikram Ghosh, Udai Mazumdar

- Ibaadat - Love is Worship (2014)
- Bhaskar - The Rising (2013)
- Singing Strings (2012)
- Kabir Tulsi and Us (2011)
- Rising (2010) - Derek Gripper & Udhai Mazumdar
- Geet Govind (2009)
- Echoes from India - Gaurav Mazumdar & Udhai Mazumdar
- Fulfilment - Shubhendra Rao & Udhai Mazumdar
- Walk on (Tatajan)

After a concert in Jakarta, Indonesia where Pandit Udhai Mazumdar lead musicians from around the world

- Reverberation – Kamala Bose & Udhai Mazumdar
- The Bamboo Flute in the Wind of Rhythm - Rakesh Chaurasia & Udhai Mazumdar
- Shabotinski Stenimals (1996)
- Journey - an elaborate Ragamala
- Shankar Ragamala
- Musik der Welt Bern
