= Keerthi Sagathia =

- Born: 14 September 1979 (age 45); Mumbai
- Occupation: Singer

Keerthi Sagathia (born 14 September 1979, in Mumbai) is a musician and singer. Keerthi is the son of famous Gujarati folk singer Karsan Sagathiya. In 2005 he was a contestant for Sony TV reality show Fame Gurukul. He was a celebrity guest singer on X Factor, Episode 29, first aired on 20 August 2011.

== Playback singing ==
Year	Song	Movie or Album	Music Director	Lyrics	Co-singer(s)	
2006	Ek Bar Jana America Janab	Yun Hota Toh Kya Hota			Javed Ali, Devraj Gadhav (Nano Dero), Madhushree	
2006	Ek Bar Jana America Janab Version 2	Yun Hota Toh Kya Hota			Joi Barua	
2007	Mayya	Guru	A.R. Rahman	Gulzar	Sung few lines with Maryem Toller and Chinmayi	
2008	Dekhta Hai Tu Kya	Krazzy 4	Rajesh Roshan	Javed Akhtar	Sunidhi Chauhan	
2008	Rang Rasiya- Title Track	Rang Rasiya	Sandesh Shandilya	Manoj Muntashir	Sunidhi Chauhan	
2009	Chikku Chikku Boom Boom	Maasilamani	D. Imman	Viveka	Baby Harini	
2009	Gunji Angna Mein Sehnai	Life Partner	Sachin-Jigar	Javed Akhtar	Sunidhi Chauhan	
2009	Jaana Hai	Let's Dance				
2010	Boom Boom Robo Da	Endhiran	A. R. Rahman	Madhan Karky	Yogi B, Swetha Mohan, Tanvi Shah	
2010	Veera Veera	Raavanan	A. R. Rahman	Mani Ratnam	Vijay Prakash Mustafa Kutoane	
2010	Beera	Raavan	A. R. Rahman	Gulzar	A. R. Rahman (uncredited)	
2010	Asahon Ke Pankh	Bumm Bumm Bole	Tapas Relia	Satish Mutatkar	Rishikesh Kamerkar, Rajeev Sundaresan, Kshitij Wagh	
2011	Nakkadwale Disco Udhaarwale Khisko	Delhi Belly	Ram Sampath	Akshat Verma, Munna Dhiman	Solo	
2012	Satyamev Jayate Theme Song	Satyamev Jayate	Ram Sampath	Prasoon Joshi	Ram Sampath	
2012	Bharat Mata Ki Jai	Shanghai	Vishal–Shekhar	Dibakar Banerjee	Vishal Dadlani, Mandar Apte, Chintamani Sohoni, R N Iyer, Bhupesh	
2012	Khandav	Arjun: The Warrior Prince	Vishal–Shekhar	Piyush Mishra	Solo	
2012	Hari Om	OMG - Oh My God!	Sachin-Jigar	Subrat Sinha	Solo	
2012	Zor Nache	Kamaal Dhamaal Malamaal	Sajid-Wajid	Jalees Sherwani	Sugandha Mishra	
2013	Mujh Mein Tu	Special 26	M M Kreem	Irshad Kamil	Solo	
2013	Tum Tak	Raanjhanaa	A. R. Rahman	Irshad Kamil	Javed Ali, Pooja Vaidyanath	
2013	Jigra Fakira	Aurangzeb	Vipin Mishra	Manoj Kumar Nath	Solo	
2013	Janta Rocks	Satyagraha	Meet Bros Anjjan	Prasoon Joshi	Meet Bros Anjjan	
2013	Rabba	Fukrey	Ram Sampath	Munna Dhiman	Clinton Cerejo, Ram Sampath	
2013	Enne Unne	Issaq			Mamta Sharma, Papon, Tarun Sagar	
2013	Bullett Raja	Bullett Raja	Sajid-Wajid	Kausar Munir	Wajid	
2013	Satake Thoko	Bullett Raja	Sajid-Wajid	Sandeep Nath	Wajid, Danish Sabri	
2014	Mannat	Daawat-e-Ishq	Sajid-Wajid	Kausar Munir	Sonu Nigam, Shreya Ghoshal	
2014	Photocopy	Jai Ho	Sajid-Wajid	Kausar Munir	Himesh Reshammiya, Palak Muchhal	
2015	Raa Mundadugeddam	Kanche	Chirantan Bhatt	Sirivennela Sitarama Sastry	Vijay Prakash	
2016	Chhap Tilak	Saat Uchakkey	Bapi-Tutul	Amir Khusrow	Solo	
2016	Ghangoor Ghan	Jai Gangaajal	Salim-Sulaiman	Manoj Muntashir	Solo	
2017	Saaho Saarvabowma Saaho	Gautamiputra Satakarni	Chirantan Bhatt	Sirivennela Sitarama Sastry	Vijay Prakash	
2018	Shubh Din	Parmanu: The Story of Pokhran	Sachin–Jigar	Vayu	Jyotica Tangri	
2019	Ghanu Jeevo	Chaal Jeevi Laiye!	Sachin–Jigar	Niren Bhatt	Bhoomi Trivedi	Gujarati
2019	Ghanu Jeevo Reprise	Chaal Jeevi Laiye!	Sachin–Jigar	Niren Bhatt	Bhoomi Trivedi	Gujarati
2022	Jordaar	Jayeshbhai Jordaar	Vishal-Shekhar	Jaideep Sahni	Vishal Dadlani	
2022	Hadd Kar Di	Samrat Prithviraj	Shankar-Ehsaan-Loy	Varun Grover	Neeti Mohan	
2022	Makhmali	Samrat Prithviraj	Shankar-Ehsaan-Loy	Varun Grover	Arijit Singh, Shreya Ghoshal	

== Albums ==
- ARRK – Sufi Rock

== Awards and nominations ==
Along with Mustafa Kutoane, Sagathia received the Uninor Radio Mirchi Award in 2010, for Upcoming Playback Singer Male for Beera Beera (Raavan).

Year	Category	Nominated work	Result	Ref.
Filmfare Awards South
2016	Best Male Playback Singer – Telugu	"Neeku Theliyanida" from Kanche	Nominated	
Mirchi Music Awards
2010	Upcoming Male Vocalist of The Year	"Beera" from Raavan	Won	
2012	Indie Pop Song of the Year	"Satyamev Jayate"	Won	
