= Karikaada =

2026 Indian Kannada language film

- Release poster
- Directed by: Venkatesh K
- Written by: Venkatesh K Kaada Natraj (story)
- Produced by: Damodar Deepthi
- Starring: Kaada Natraj; Niriksha Shetty
- Cinematography: Jeevan Gowda
- Edited by: Deepak CS Gowda
- Music by: Athishay Jain; Shashank Sheshagiri
- Production company: Riddhi Entertainments
- Release date: 6 February 2026
- Running time: 140 minutes
- Country: India
- Language: Kannada

Karikaada is a 2026 Indian Kannada-language film directed by Venkatesha. K. The film stars Kaada Natraj, Niriksha Shetty in the lead role.

== Cast ==
- Kaada Natraj as Kaada
- Niriksha Shetty as Kanaka
- Yash Shetty as Malli
- Bala Rajwadi as Bhupati
- Kriti Verma
- Vijay Chendoor as Tent Seena
- Vipin Prakash as Tupaki Kaanta

== Reception ==
Susmita Sameera of The Times of India said that "Karikaada presents an ambitious reincarnation-based story filled with action and drama, backed by several interesting ideas. Unfortunately, the disrupted flow and uneven storytelling prevent it from reaching its full potential. Viewers who enjoy rural dramas with romantic action elements may still find it worth a watch, provided they are willing to navigate its narrative complexity." A. Sharadhaa of The New Indian Express said that "Karikaada is likely to connect with audiences who enjoy the blend of action, melodrama, and rural appeal. For urban audiences or those seeking coherent storytelling and strong character arcs, the film may feel patchy. While Kada Nataraj and Niriksha Shetty show promise, and the supporting cast performs competently, the film struggles to turn its ambitious idea into a satisfying cinematic experience."
