= Tere Bina (song) =

Song by A. R. Rahman featuring Murtuza Khan, Quadir Khan & Chinmayi

from the album Guru
- Released: 18 November 2006
- Recorded: 2006; Panchathan Record Inn
- Genre: Feature film soundtrack
- Length: 5:09
- Label: Sony Music
- Songwriters: A. R. Rahman (music), Gulzar (lyrics)
- Producer: A. R. Rahman

Music video
- "Tere Bina" on YouTube

"Tere Bina" is a 2006 Hindi song from the 2007 Hindi film Guru. It was composed by A. R. Rahman, performed by A.R. Rahman, Murtuza Khan, Quadir Khan and Chinmayi and written by Gulzar. It is a love ballad composed in sufi style of music. It is dedicated to the memory of Pakistani qawwali singer Ustad Nusrat Fateh Ali Khan written at the time of the tenth anniversary of his death. The music video was picturised as a dance sequence by Aishwarya Rai and Abhishek Bachchan. The song begins with dham dara dham dara refrains, sung by Murtuza Khan and Quadir Khan.

== Reception ==
The song received favourable critical responses.

The song, along with its entire soundtrack album has proved a success, staying at the number one spot thirteen weeks after its release.

== Usage in media ==
An excerpt of the song is used in the 2013 American animated sports comedy film Planes, produced by DisneyToon Studios and released by Walt Disney Pictures.

== See also ==
- Guru (soundtrack)
