= Mayya (song) =

2006 Hindi song

- Screenshot from the song "Mayya Mayya featuring Mallika Sherawat"

Song by A. R. Rahman (composer) and Maryem Toller, Chinmayi Sripada, Keerthi Sagathia (singers)

from the album Guru
- Released: 18 November 2006
- Recorded: 2006; Panchathan Record Inn
- Genre: Feature film soundtrack
- Length: 6:02
- Label: Sony Music
- Songwriters: A. R. Rahman (music), Gulzar (lyrics)
- Producer: A. R. Rahman

Music video
- "Mayya" on YouTube

"Mayya" is a popular Hindi song from the 2007 Hindi film, Guru. It was composed by A. R. Rahman, performed by Maryem Toller, Chinmayi Sripada, Keerthi Sagathia and written by Gulzar. Apart from the film's soundtrack, it also appeared in the compilation album, A. R. Rahman – A World of Music released in 2009. The song was also released in Tamil and Telugu in which most of the portions were sung by Chinmayi.

== Development ==
Rahman personally trained Egyptian singer Maryem Tollar to sing "Mayya", a song which Rahman wrote while on Hajj in Makkah. After he heard a man near a river who was continually repeating "moya moya moya" (water in Arabic), he told Gulzar to incorporate the word into the tune he had created while touring in Toronto, Ontario, Canada. Mayya was the first song recorded for the film.

== Reception ==
The song received excellent critical reviews, most of them hailing the international appeal of the song. A review on Planetbollywood said, "Mayya is an internationally intoxicating number...This is a prime example of how good a pan-global sound can make you feel!" The song, along with its entire soundtrack album has proved a success, staying at the number one spot thirteen weeks after its release.

== Music video ==
The video was filmed as a seductive Turkish themed dance by Mallika Sherawat. This was after a long time that Mallika did such an exotic dance performance in a music video.

== Cover version ==
The track Mayya was sampled by Serbian artist Jelena Karleuša in her 2008 album JK Revolution. The track "Mala" and its Teatro Mix were credited to Rahman. Additionally, Mayya was performed and popularized by Saregamapa contestant Mauli Dave and has become her signature track.

== See also ==
Guru (soundtrack)
