= Barso Re =

Song by Shreya Ghoshal & Uday Mazumdar

from the album Guru
- Released: 2007
- Length: 5:29
- Songwriter: Gulzar
- Producer: A. R. Rahman

Music video
- "Barso Re" on YouTube

"Barso Re" (transl. It rains) is a song from soundtrack of the 2007 Indian Hindi biographical film Guru, directed by Mani Ratnam. The song was composed by A. R. Rahman with lyrics provided by Gulzar and sung by Shreya Ghoshal, featuring Uday Mazumdar. The song was well received, with Shreya Ghoshal receiving many accolades.

== Picturization ==
The song is picturized on Sujata (Aishwarya Rai), and appears when she decides to leave her parents to elope with her boyfriend. In later part Sujata finally leaves her parents.

The video of the song is shot in Kerala where the opening scene of majestic Athirapilly waterfalls is shown and at the villages of Karnataka, the Rayagopura at Melukote temple, and a few more. According to some sources, the majority of rain used in the song is natural as it was monsoon season, hence little artificial rain was needed.

== Choreography ==
The dance in the video was choreographed by Saroj Khan, for which she won her eighth Filmfare Best Choreography Award. The dance shows Sujata dancing like one would when it rains. Aishwarya is also seen dancing atop a large rock with water below, amidst the thunderstorm.

== Awards ==
Filmfare Awards

- Won, Best Female Playback – Shreya Ghoshal
- Won, Best Choreography – Saroj Khan

Star Screen Awards

- Won, Best Female Playback – Shreya Ghoshal

IIFA Awards

- Won, Best Female Playback – Shreya Ghoshal

Zee Cine Awards

- Won, Best Female Playback – Shreya Ghoshal
