= Maryem Tollar =

- Born: 1968 (age 57–58); Cairo, Egypt
- Occupation: vocalist
- Formerly of: Mernie!

Maryem Tollar (born 1968 in Cairo, Egypt) is a Toronto-based singer who primarily sings Arabic songs. She played with her own band called Mernie!.

Born in Cairo, Maryem went to Halifax, Nova Scotia, Canada with her parents when she was one year old in 1969. Four years later, her father began working in Qatar and Saudi Arabia, so her family moved back to the Middle East and stayed there until she graduated from The American University in Cairo. Throughout those times, Maryem always had a taste for music and sang in every school production. Her parents were originally against the idea of Maryem becoming a singer, but after university, Maryem started pursuing her dream. She first performed with Toronto-based Arab band Hot D.A.M. and later sang in Arabic for her brother's compositions. Later, she went to Syria and Egypt to further her studies and gained recognition from the Canada Council. She began receiving calls to perform with different groups as well as for recording sessions for commercials and films. Eventually, Maryem started a music group called "Mernie!" with her husband, Ernie Tollar. The band is a 10-piece ensemble, while she and her husband compose all of the music and everyone in the band come from different cultural backgrounds. Together, they have made one CD so far, entitled Flowers of Forgiveness.

In 2007, director Liz Marshall made a Bravo!FACT funded a video for the Arabic lament "Mawal Saba".

Maryem sang "Mayya Mayya" song for the 2007 Bollywood film, Guru, composed by A. R. Rahman. Tollar is the artist behind the ending credits theme song used in the Canadian sitcom, Little Mosque on the Prairie, a rendition of the popular Islamic praise song Tala‘al Badru ‘Alayna (the press kit on her website misidentifies the show as "Little Mosque on the Prairies").

Tollar was a nominee (unsuccessful) to represent the Green Party in the riding of Davenport for the 2021 federal election.

Together with Jayne Brown, Sophia Grigoriadis and Brenna MacCrimmon, Maryem performs with the Toronto-based quartet Turkwaz and other collaborators. Their 2016 release Nazar earned a Juno nomination.

== Electoral record ==
2021 Canadian federal election: Davenport
Party	Candidate	Votes	%	±%	Expenditures
Liberal	Julie Dzerowicz	19,930	42.13	-1.59	$101,254.58
New Democratic	Alejandra Bravo	19,854	41.97	+0.95	$102,816.01
Conservative	Jenny Kalimbet	4,774	10.09	+0.84	$6,403.32
People's	Tara Dos Remedios	1,499	3.17	+2.24	$3,001.04
Green	Adrian Currie	1,087	2.30	-2.21	$14,660.32
Independent	Troy Young	86	0.18		none listed
Independent	Chai Kalevar	77	0.16	+0.01	none listed
Total valid votes/expense limit		47,307	99.10	–	$109,525.37
Total rejected ballots		429	0.90	+0.12	
Turnout		47,736	61.07	-4.26	
Eligible voters		78,167			
Source: Elections Canada

== Discography ==
- Book of Life album featuring Stolen Childhood, lyrics by Ehab Lotayef and other songs
- Nazar, albumn by Turkwaz
