= Sunil Manchanda =

Indian film director

- Occupation: Producer
- Employer: MAD Entertainment Ltd.

Sunil Manchanda is an Indian film director, and producer, and an advertisement producer.

== Career ==
His 2003 film Tere Naam won four awards. Manchanda also produced Cheeni Kum in 2007, which won one award and was nominated for four others. On 4 December 2009, Paa was released in 34 countries worldwide. It was originally supposed to be produced by Manchanda and Director R Balakrishnan, but was instead changed to Manchanda and AB Corporation.

In 2017, Manchanda was one of the producers behind the movie Mom.

== Films ==
His most notable films include:

Film	Year
Mom	2017
Tevar	2015
Shamitabh	2015
Aisha	2010
Paa	2009
Cheeni Kum	2007
Salaam-e-Ishq: A Tribute to Love	2007
Kyon Ki	2005
Dil Ne Jise Apna Kahaa	2004
Tere Naam	2003
Prithvi	1997
Army	1996

== Awards, nominations ==
- Paa received 14 Nominations for 16th Star Screen Awards

and won 5 awards at the Screen Awards

- Cheeni Kum received 1 award and 4 nominations, including the Apsara Award for Best Movie (2008)
- Tere Naam received 4 awards and 16 nominations
