= 11th IIFA Awards =

Indian film award ceremony in 2010

- Date: 3 June 2010– 5 June 2010
- Site: Sugathadasa Stadium; Bandaranaike Memorial International Conference Hall, Colombo
- Hosted by: Boman Irani; Ritesh Deshmukh; Lara Dutta

Highlights
- Best Picture: 3 Idiots
- Best Direction: Rajkumar Hirani (3 Idiots)
- Best Actor: Amitabh Bachchan (Paa)
- Best Actress: Kareena Kapoor and Vidya Balan (3 Idiots and Paa)
- Most awards: 3 Idiots (16)
- Most nominations: 3 Idiots (22)

Television coverage
- Channel: Star Plus
- Network: STAR TV

The 2010 IIFA Awards, officially the 11th International Indian Film Academy Awards ceremony, presented by the International Indian Film Academy honoured the best films of 2009 and took place between 3 – 5 June 2010. The official ceremony took place on 5 June 2010, at the Sugathadasa Stadium in Colombo, Sri Lanka. During the ceremony, IIFA Awards were awarded in 23 competitive categories. The ceremony was televised in India and internationally on Star Plus. The ceremony was hosted by Boman Irani, Ritesh Deshmukh and Lara Dutta.

In related events, the IIFA Music and Fashion Extravaganza took place on 4 June 2010 at the Bandaranaike Memorial International Conference Hall. During the event, all technical awards were presented to the winners.

3 Idiots led the ceremony with 14 nominations, followed by Love Aaj Kal with 10 nominations, and Kaminey and Paa with 8 nominations each.

3 Idiots won 16 awards, including Best Film, Best Director (for Rajkumar Hirani), Best Actress (for Kareena Kapoor), Best Supporting Actor (for Sharman Joshi) and Best Villain (for Boman Irani), thus becoming the most–awarded film at the ceremony.

Other winners were Aladin, Love Aaj Kal and Paa with 3 awards, and All the Best: Fun Begins, Delhi–6, Dev.D, Kal Kissne Dekha, Kaminey and Wake Up Sid with 1 award.

== Background ==
The awards began in 2000 and the first ceremony was held in London at The Millennium Dome. From then on the awards were held at locations around the world signifying the international success of Bollywood. The next award ceremony was announced to be held in Toronto, Ontario, Canada in 2011. The award ceremonies are held in various places around the world.

== Winners of and nominees ==
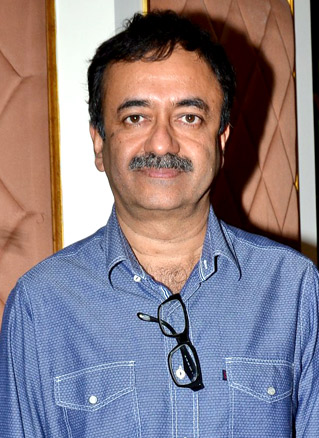
Rajkumar Hirani, Best Director winner

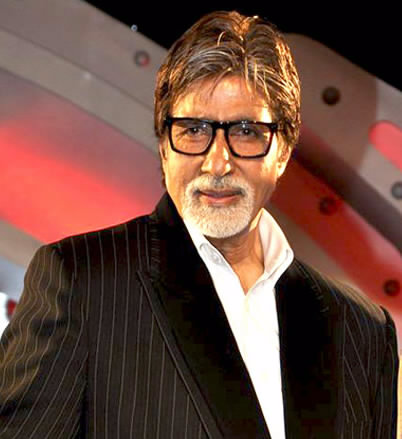
Amitabh Bachchan, Best Actor winner

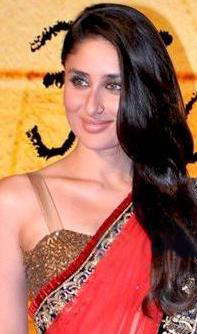
Kareena Kapoor, Co–Best Actress winner

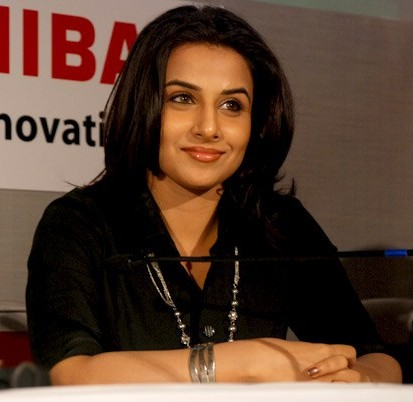
Vidya Balan, Co-Best Actress winner

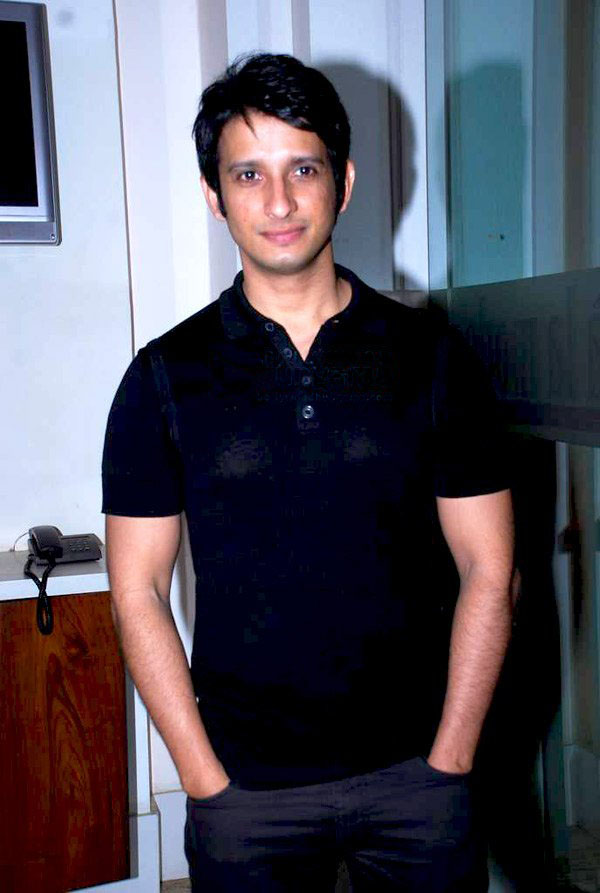
Sharman Joshi, Best Supporting Actor winner

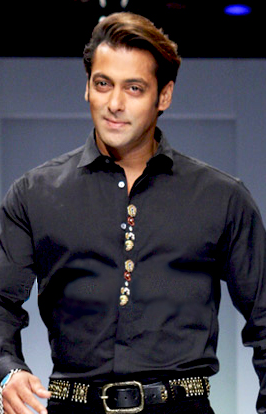
Salman Khan, Habitat Humanity Ambassadorship Award winner

Winners are listed first and highlighted in boldface.

=== Popular awards ===
Best Picture	Best Director
**3 Idiots – Vinod Chopra Productions**; Dev.D – UTV Spot Boy and Bindass; Kaminey – UTV Motion Pictures; Love Aaj Kal – Illuminati Films and Eros International; Paa – Reliance Big Pictures, MAD Entertainment Ltd. and Amitabh Bachchan Corporation; Wake Up Sid – Dharma Productions	**Rajkumar Hirani – 3 Idiots**; Anurag Kashyap – Dev.D; Ayan Mukerji – Wake Up Sid; Imtiaz Ali – Love Aaj Kal; R. Balki – Paa; Vishal Bhardwaj – Kaminey
Best Performance In A Leading Role Male	Best Performance In A Leading Role Female
**Amitabh Bachchan – Paa as Auro**; Aamir Khan – 3 Idiots as Ranchhoddas "Rancho" Shamaldas Chanchad / Phunsukh Wangdu; Ranbir Kapoor – Wake Up Sid as Siddharth "Sid" Mehra; Saif Ali Khan – Love Aaj Kal as Jai Vardhan Singh; Salman Khan – Wanted as Radhe / Rajveer Shekhawat; Shahid Kapoor – Kaminey as Charlie Sharma / Guddu Sharma	**Kareena Kapoor – 3 Idiots as Pia Sahastrabudhhe (tie)**; **Vidya Balan – Paa as Vidya (tie)**; Deepika Padukone – Love Aaj Kal as Meera Pandit; Mahie Gill – Dev.D as Parminder (Paro); Priyanka Chopra – Kaminey as Sweety Shekhar Bhope
Best Performance In A Supporting Role Male	Best Performance In A Supporting Role Female
**Sharman Joshi – 3 Idiots as Raju Rastogi**; Abhimanyu Singh – Gulaal as Rananjay Singh "Ransa"; Abhishek Bachchan – Paa as Amol Arte; Irrfan Khan – New York as Roshan; R. Madhavan – 3 Idiots as Farhan Qureshi; Rishi Kapoor – Love Aaj Kal as Veer Singh	**Divya Dutta – Delhi–6 as Jalebi**; Arundhati Nag – Paa as Vidya's mother; Kalki Koechlin – Dev.D as Leni/Chandramukhi (Chanda); Kirron Kher – Kurbaan as Aapa; Supriya Pathak – Wake Up Sid as Sarita
Best Performance In A Comic Role	Best Performance In A Negative Role
**Sanjay Dutt – All the Best: Fun Begins as Dharam Kapoor**; Ajay Devgn – All the Best: Fun Begins as Prem Chopra; Govinda – Life Partner as Jeet Oberoi; Johnny Lever – De Dana Dan as Kaala Krishna Murari; Omi Vaidya – 3 Idiots as Chatur Ramalingam (Silencer)	**Boman Irani – 3 Idiots as Viru Sahastrabudhhe (Virus)**; Amole Gupte – Kaminey as Sunil Shekhar Bhope (Bhope Bhau); Arya Babbar – Jail as Kabir Malik; Kay Kay Menon – Gulaal as Dukey Bana; Prakash Raj – Wanted as Gani Bhai / Shanshuddin Azgar Gani
Male Debutant Star	Female Debutant Star
**Omi Vaidya – 3 Idiots as Chatur Ramalingam (Silencer) (tie)**; **Jackky Bhagnani – Kal Kissne Dekha as Nihaal Singh (tie)**	**Jacqueline Fernandez – Aladin as Jasmine (tie)**; **Mahi Gill – Dev.D as Parminder (Paro) (tie)**

=== Musical awards ===
Best Music Director	Best Lyrics
**Pritam – Love Aaj Kal**; A. R. Rahman – Delhi–6; Amit Trivedi – Dev.D; Shantanu Moitra – 3 Idiots; Vishal Bhardwaj – Kaminey	**Swanand Kirkire – 3 Idiots**; Amitabh Bhattacharya – Dev.D; Gulzar – Kaminey; Irshad Kamil – Love Aaj Kal; Prasoon Joshi – Delhi–6
Best Male Playback Singer	Best Female Playback Singer
**Shaan for "Behti Hawa Sa Tha Woh" – 3 Idiots**; Atif Aslam for "Tu Jaane Na" – Ajab Prem Ki Ghazab Kahani; Mohit Chauhan for "Masakali" – Delhi-6; Rahat Fateh Ali Khan for "Aaj Din Chadheya" – Love Aaj Kal; Sonu Nigam for "All Izz Well" – 3 Idiots; Sukhwinder Singh and Vishal Dadlani for "Dhan Te Nan" – Kaminey	**Kavita Seth for "Iktara" – Wake Up Sid**; Rekha Bhardwaj for "Sasural Genda Phool" – Delhi–6; Shilpa Rao for "Mudi Mudi" – Paa; Shreya Ghoshal for "Zoobi Doobi" – 3 Idiots; Sunidhi Chauhan for "Chor Bazaari" – Love Aaj Kal; Tulsi Kumar for "Haafiz Khuda" – 8 x 10 Tasveer
Best Background Score
**3 Idiots – Sanjay Wandrekar, Atul Raninga and Shantanu Moitra**

=== Backstage awards ===
Best Story	Best Screenplay
**3 Idiots – Abhijat Joshi, Rajkumar Hirani and Vidhu Vinod Chopra**; Dev.D – Anurag Kashyap and Vikramaditya Motwane; Love Aaj Kal – Imtiaz Ali; Paa – R. Balki; Wake Up Sid – Ayan Mukerji	**3 Idiots – Abhijat Joshi, Rajkumar Hirani and Vidhu Vinod Chopra**
Best Dialogue
**3 Idiots – Rajkumar Hirani and Abhijat Joshi**

=== Technical awards ===
Best Art Direction	Best Action
**Aladin – Sabu Cyril**	**Kaminey – Shyam Kaushal**
Best Cinematographer	Best Choreography
**3 Idiots – C. K. Muraleedharan**	**Love Aaj Kal – Bosco Martis and Caesar Gonsalves**
Best Costume Design	Best Editing
**Love Aaj Kal – Anaita Shroff Adajania and Dolly Ahluwalia**	**3 Idiots – Rajkumar Hirani**
Best Makeup	Best Sound Recording
**Paa – Christien Tinsley and Domini Till**	**3 Idiots – Bishwadeep Chatterjee and Nihal Ranjan Samel**
Best Sound Re–Recording	Best Special Effects
**3 Idiots – Anup Dev**	**Aladin – Charles Darby and Eyecube Labs**

=== Special awards ===
==== Green Globe Award ====
- Vivek Oberoi

==== Habitat Humanity Ambassadorship Award ====
- Salman Khan

==== Outstanding Achievement in Cinema ====
- Rakeysh Omprakash Mehra **(Indian Cinema – Male)**
- Zeenat Aman **(Indian Cinema – Female)**
- Anil Kapoor **(International Cinema)**

== Superlatives ==
Films with multiple nominations
Nominations	Film
14	3 Idiots
10	Love Aaj Kal
8	Kaminey
8	Paa
7	Dev.D
6	Wake Up Sid
5	De Dana Dan
2	All the Best: Fun Begins
2	Gulaal
2	Wanted

Films with multiple awards
Awards	Film
16	3 Idiots
3	Aladin
3	Love Aaj Kal
3	Paa

== See also ==
- International Indian Film Academy Awards
- Bollywood
- Cinema of India
