= Ghoomer =

2023 Indian drama film

- Threatical release poster
- Directed by: R. Balki
- Written by: R. Balki; Rahul Sengupta; Rishi Virmani
- Produced by: Rakesh Jhunjhunwala; Abhishek Bachchan; Gauri Shinde; Ramesh Pulapaka; Anil Naidu
- Starring: Abhishek Bachchan; Saiyami Kher; Shabana Azmi; Angad Bedi
- Cinematography: Vishal Sinha
- Edited by: Nipun Ashok Gupta
- Music by: Amit Trivedi
- Production companies: Hope Film Makers; Saraswati Entertainment; Amitabh Bachchan Corporation
- Distributed by: Pen Marudhar Entertainment
- Release dates: 12 August 2023 (Melbourne); 18 August 2023
- Running time: 134 minutes
- Country: India
- Language: Hindi
- Box office: est. ₹7 crore

Ghoomer (lit. 'Spinner') (Note: 'Ghoomna' in Hindi means to spin and "er" suffixe add to it from English, that's why "Ghoomer" translates to "Spinner.") is a 2023 Indian Hindi-language sports drama film written and directed by R. Balki. It stars Abhishek Bachchan, Shabana Azmi Saiyami Kher, and Angad Bedi.

The film had its world premiere as the opening film at the 12th Indian Film Festival of Melbourne on 12 August 2023 and was released theatrically in India on 18 August 2023. At 69th Filmfare Awards, the film received three nominations, including Best Actor (Critics) for Bachchan and Best Supporting Actress for Azmi.

== Plot ==
Anina "Ani" Dixit, a bright and upcoming batting prodigy, loses her right hand in a freak accident. However, the unsympathetic and failed test cricketer, Padam "Paddy" Singh Sodhi, gives her new hope in the form of bowling. He trains her with unconventional techniques, to turn her fate around as a bowler. Spinning or "Ghoomer", is a new style of bowling they both invented. Will Anina be able to qualify and make it into the Indian women's team as a bowler, with less than 10 months to go?

== Cast ==
- Abhishek Bachchan as Padam "Paddy" Singh Sodhi
- Saiyami Kher as Anina "Ani" Dixit
  - Pari Sharma as Young Anina
- Shabana Azmi as Anina's grandmother
- Angad Bedi as Jeet, Anina’s boyfriend
  - Bhagya Bhanushali as Young Jeet
- Shivendra Singh Dungarpur as Anina's father
- Akshay Joshi as Anina's brother Tishu
- Piyush Raina as Anina's brother Anuj
- Ivanka Das as Rasika
- Padmanabh Bind as Male selector Morey
- Kiran Navgire as Coach
- Bishan Singh Bedi in a cameo appearance as himself
- Mohit Kumar as Treasurer Bhavik
- Amitabh Bachchan in a special appearance as a cricket commentator
- Neroli Meadows in a special appearance as a cricket commentator
- Subhalaxmi Sharma as Captain Dipti
- Kavita Singh as Anjali
- Bhakti Teli as Diya
- Sayali Sathghare as Geetha
- Vedika Dawane as Jayshri
- Priya Kaushik as Manmeet
- Niddhi Dawada as Meena
- Sushmita Avhad as Nanda
- Nirali Oza as Nasreen
- Prakashika Naik as Preetha
- Akshayaa Surve as Rodriquez
- Saima Thakor as Simran
- Abbas Momin as Bartender
- Kajal Sisodia as Tanvi
- Guneet Sandhu as Anina's Classmate
- Amber Botha as English player Amber
- Nonkhululeko Thabethe as English player Archer
- Bernadette Greeff as English player Bernadette
- Christine Tomlinson as English player Christine
- Samantha Schutte as English player Evans
- Lebogang Nkadimeng as English player Grant
- Kayla Abbott as English player Kayla
- Nicole Slier as English player Nicole
- Paulinah Mashishi as English player Pauline
- Jenna Searle as English player Searle
- Christen Van Wyk as English player Williams

== Production ==
The film started in 2021 and was wrapped in June 2022.

== Music ==
Ghoomer

Soundtrack album by Amit Trivedi
- Released: 10 August 2023
- Recorded: 2022
- Genre: Feature film soundtrack
- Length: 15:43
- Language: Hindi
- Label: Zee Music Company

Amit Trivedi chronology
Mrs Chatterjee vs Norway (2023)	Ghoomer (2023)	Ganapath (2023)

Official audio
- Ghoomer – Full Album on YouTube

The film's music is composed by Amit Trivedi with lyrics written by Kausar Munir and Swanand Kirkire.

Track listing
No.	Title	Lyrics	Singer(s)	Length
1.	"Ghoomer"	Kausar Munir	Dipakshi Kalita, Altamash Faridi	3:46
2.	"Dil Dum Chhalla"	Kausar Munir	Varun Jain	3:45
3.	"Taqdeer Se Taqraa"	Swanand Kirkire	Mika Singh	4:00
4.	"Purnaviram"	Swanand Kirkire	Amit Trivedi, Rupali Moghe	4:12
Total length:				15:43

== Reception ==
On the review aggregator website Rotten Tomatoes, Ghoomer received a rating of 75%, based on 12 reviews, with an average rating of 6.8/10.

Renuka Vyavahare of The Times of India rated the film 4 stars out of 5 and wrote "A poignant and powerful tale of human resilience". In a review, Monika Rawal Kukreja of Hindustan Times wrote "Abhishek Bachchan, Saiyami Kher's stellar acts will move you". Lachmi Deb Roy of Firstpost rated 3 stars out of 5 and wrote "Abhishek Bachchan and Saiyami Kher’s powerful performances will leave you awestruck".

In a review, Toshiro Agarwal of Times Now wrote "Saiyami Kher, Abhishek Bachchan Film Is An Inspiring Journey Of Resilience And Triumph".

Taran Adarsh of Bollywood Hungama awarded the film 2.5/5 stars and wrote "Ghoomer rests on Abhishek Bachchan and Saiyami Kher’s performances and some well-executed scenes. But the narrative is too quick and the trailer ended up showing nearly the whole story."

== Accolades ==
Award	Ceremony date	Category	Recipients	Result	Ref.
Filmfare Awards	28 January 2024	Best Actor (Critics)	Abhishek Bachchan	Nominated	
Filmfare Awards	28 January 2024	Best Actress (Critics)	Saiyami Kher	Nominated	
Filmfare Awards	28 January 2024	Best Supporting Actress	Shabana Azmi	Nominated	
