= P. C. Sreeram =

Indian cinematographer and film director

PC Sreeram
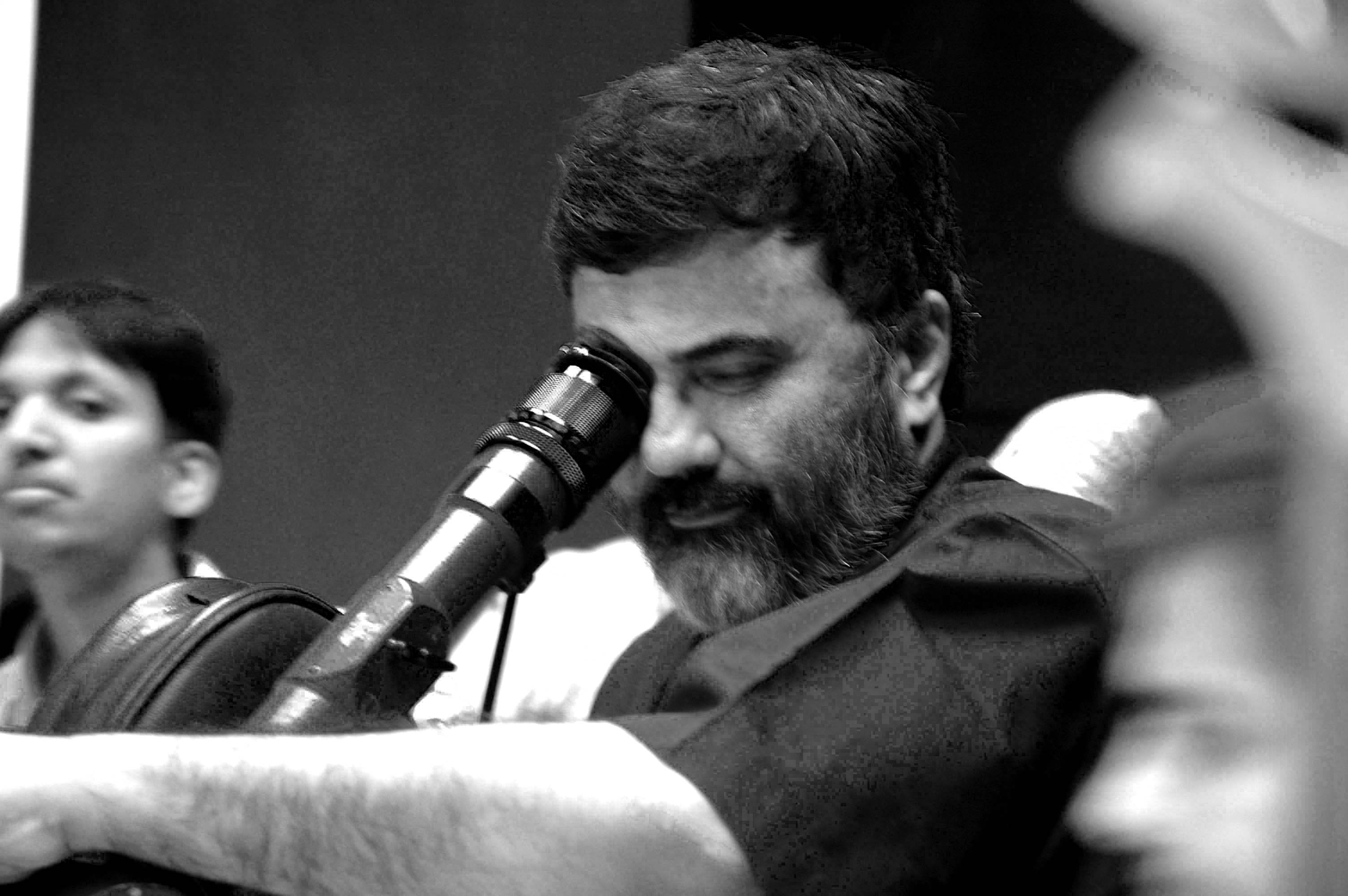
- Born: 26 January 1956 (age 70); Madras, Madras State (now Chennai, Tamil Nadu), India
- Other names: P. C, P. C. Sriram, PC Sreeraman
- Education: Madras Film Institute
- Occupations: Cinematographer, Film Director
- Years active: 1982–present
- Children: 2
- Relatives: P. R. Sundaram Iyer (grandfather)

P. C. Sreeram ISC (born 26 January 1956) is an Indian cinematographer and film director who works in Indian films. He is also the president of Qube Cinemas, a digital cinema technology company. He is an alumnus of the Madras Film Institute. Apart from his work as a cinematographer, Sreeram was much appreciated for his directorial venture Kuruthipunal. The film was internationally acclaimed and was submitted by India as its official entry to the Oscars in 1996. Sreeram is known for his association with Bharathan, Mani Ratnam, R Balki, Vikram Kumar, and received critical acclaim for his work in films such as Thevar Magan, Mouna Ragam, Nayakan, Cheeni Kum, Agni Natchathiram, Paa, Geethanjali, Alaipayuthey, I, Pad Man, O Kadhal Kanmani, Thiruda Thiruda, Ishq, and Remo. He has worked as a cinematographer in over 30 films spanning across Tamil, Telugu, Malayalam, Kannada and Hindi language, besides directing three films and a few TV commercials in Chennai and Mumbai. He is also one of the founding members of Indian Society of Cinematographers (ISC).

== Early life and family ==
Sreeram was born on 26 January 1956 in Madras (now Chennai). Sreeram's aspiration towards films grew much during his childhood days. He was educated at the Vidya Mandir Senior Secondary School, Mylapore, and PS High School Mylapore Mylapore Chennai. As a student he was not interested in studies. He had a passion for photography and after many years of struggle he joined the Madras Film Institute to pursue a course in cinematography. The "Samco" group, which included Kamal Haasan, C. Rudhraiya, Santhana Bharathi, Radharavi, R. C. Sakthi, Mani Ratnam, and a few others, used to meet at a hotel in Chennai and share their knowledge of cinema and future ambitions of making a perfect film.

His niece Preetha Jayaraman, a cinematographer in the Tamil film industry, was inspired to her calling largely by her uncle's work in the field. Sreeram's daughter died in November 2010, aged 23, after falling from the terrace of a friend's house.

== Career ==
Sreeram received his diploma in motion picture photography from the Madras Film Institute in 1979, and made his cinematic debut in the early 1980s. One of his earlier works, Meendum Oru Kaathal Kathai (1985), won the Indira Gandhi Award for Best Debut Film of a Director in 1984. Following a few commercially unsuccessful releases, he worked with Mani Ratnam for the first time in Mouna Ragam (1986). The film gave a much-needed breakthrough for both of them. Following the film's success, the pair went on to work in Nayagan (1987). The film went on to win three National Film Awards at the 35th National Film Awards; Sreeram was awarded that year's National Film Award. He used new techniques in the camera for their next film Agni Natchathiram and was praised very much for his work. Sreeram shot all of Ratnam's films until Geethanjali (1989). The film was both critically acclaimed and commercially successful besides winning the National Film Award for Best Popular Film Providing Wholesome Entertainment and seven Nandi Awards—including the Best Story and Best Cinematography awards for Ratnam and Sreeram, respectively.

During the early 1990s, Sreeram worked in Gopura Vasalile (1991) and Thevar Magan (1992). He made his directorial debut in 1992 with Meera, starring Vikram and Aishwarya . The film had a delayed release and was a poor grosser at the box-office. The following year, he renewed his association with Ratnam in the latter's Thiruda Thiruda.

Sreeram directed his second film Kuruthipunal (1995), a police story based on the Hindi film Drohkaal (1994). The film was India's official entry to the Oscars in 1996. It was showcased at the Rotterdam International Film Festival under the category "Director in Focus" eight years after its release. In 2004, he directed Vaanam Vasappadum, the first Indian film to make use of high-definition digital technology. The film was screened at the Mumbai International Film Festival and the ninth International Film Festival of Kerala. In 2007, Sreeram made his Bollywood debut with R. Balki's Cheeni Kum. Since then, Sreeram has shot all of Balki's films—Paa (2009), Shamitabh (2015), Ki & Ka (2016) and Pad Man (2018).

== Legacy ==
Sreeram is well known for his longtime association with Mani Ratnam, Moulee and Kamal Haasan. He received critical acclaim for his work in films such as Mouna Ragam, Nayakan, Geetaanjali, Thevar Magan, Thiruda Thiruda and Alaipayuthey. He has mentored some of the prominent cinematographers in the Indian film industry including Jeeva, M. S. Prabhu, Ramji, Chezhiyan, Fowzia Fathima, Mahesh Muthuswami, Dwaraganath, Arun Vincent, Preetha Jayaraman, K. V. Anand, Tirru, Balasubramaniem, K. V. Guhan, Nirav Shah, Sivakumar Vijayan, Tanveer Mir, Vivekanand Santhosham, Sathyan Sooryan, and Arvind Krishna. In January 2016, Sreeram was elected as the president of South Indian Film Cinematographers Association.

== Filmography ==
=== As cinematographer ===
Year	Title	Language	Notes
1981	Vaa Indha Pakkam	Tamil	Debut
1982	Oru Varisu Uruvagiradhu	Tamil	
1982	Nandri, Meendum Varuga	Tamil	
1985	Meendum Oru Kaathal Kathai	Tamil	
1985	Koodum Thedi	Malayalam	Debut Malayalam film
1985	Poove Poochooda Vaa	Tamil	
1986	Mouna Ragam	Tamil	
1986	Nee Thana Antha Kuyil	Tamil	
1987	Nayakan	Tamil	
1988	Sathyaa	Tamil	1 Song
1988	Agni Natchathiram	Tamil	
1989	Apoorva Sagodharargal	Tamil	
1989	Geethanjali	Telugu	Debut Telugu film
1990	Idhaya Thamarai	Tamil	
1991	Gopura Vasalile	Tamil	
1992	Amaran	Tamil	
1992	Thevar Magan	Tamil	
1992	Meera	Tamil	Directorial debut
1993	Thiruda Thiruda	Tamil	
1994	May Madham	Tamil	
1995	Subha Sankalpam	Telugu	
1995	Kuruthipunal	Tamil	Also director
1998	Shanti Shanti Shanti	Kannada	Debut Kannada film
1999	Mugam	Tamil	
1999	Kadhalar Dhinam	Tamil	
2000	Mugavaree	Tamil	
2000	Alaipayuthey	Tamil	
2001	Kushi	Telugu	
2004	Vaanam Vasappadum	Tamil	Also director
2005	Kanda Naal Mudhal	Tamil	
2006	Varalaru	Tamil	1 song
2007	Cheeni Kum	Hindi	Debut Hindi film
2008	Dhaam Dhoom	Tamil	Partly completed
2008	Keka	Telugu	
2009	13B; Yavarum Nalam	Hindi; Tamil	
2009	Paa	Hindi	
2012	Ishq	Telugu	
2015	I	Tamil	
2015	Shamitabh	Hindi	
2015	O Kadhal Kanmani	Tamil	
2016	Ki & Ka	Hindi	
2016	Remo	Tamil	
2018	Pad Man	Hindi	
2018	Naa... Nuvve	Telugu	
2018	Praana	Malayalam	
2020	Psycho	Tamil	Partly completed
2020	Putham Pudhu Kaalai	Tamil	Segment Avarum Naanum - Avalum Naanum
2021	Navarasa	Tamil	Segment Guitar Kambi Mele Nindru
2021	Rang De	Telugu	
2022	Thank You	Telugu	
2023	Lust Stories 2	Hindi	Segment Made For Each Other
2024	Love Me	Telugu	

== Awards and nominations ==
Year	Nominated work	Category	Result	Notes
1987	Nayakan	National Film Award for Best Cinematography	Won	
1990	Geethanjali	Nandi Award for Best Cinematographer	Won	
1992	Thevar Magan	Cinema Express Award for Best Cameraman	Won	
1993	Thiruda Thiruda	Cinema Express Award for Best Cameraman	Won	
1999	Kadhalar Dhinam	Dinakaran Award for Best Cinematographer	Won	
2000	Alaipayuthey	Filmfare Award for Best Cinematographer - South	Won	
2006	Varalaru	Vijay Award for Best Cinematographer (Special Jury)	Won	
2012	Ishq	CineMAA Award for Best Cinematographer	Won	
2012	Ishq	CineMAA Award for Life Time Contribution	Won	
2012	Ishq	SIIMA Award for Best Cinematographer (Telugu)	Nominated	

=== Honours ===
- Kalaimamani Award - 1998
