= Aaj Din Chadheya =

2009 Hindi song

Song by Rahat Fateh Ali Khan

from the album Love Aaj Kal
- Released: 27 June 2009
- Genre: Filmi; acoustic pop; R&B
- Length: 3:37
- Label: Eros Music
- Composer: Pritam
- Lyricist: Irshad Kamil
- Producers: Saif Ali Khan; Dinesh Vijan

Love Aaj Kal track listing
- 1. "Twist"; 2. "Chor Bazari"; 3. "Aaj Din Chadheya"; 4. "Aahun Aahun"; 5. "Dooriyaan"; 6. "Thoda Thoda Pyaar"; 7. "Main Kya Hoon

Aaj Din Chadheya (transl. The Day Has Risen Today) is a romantic Hindi-language song from the 2009 film Love Aaj Kal. The track is composed by Pritam, with lyrics written by Irshad Kamil. The song has been sung by Rahat Fateh Ali Khan. The music video of the song featured actors Saif Ali Khan and Deepika Padukone. The song was placed in Filmfare's 60 most romantic Hindi songs ever list.

== Development ==
The song was composed by Pritam Chakraborty and Salim–Sulaiman, with the former composing songs and latter the score. The lyrics for songs were penned by Irshad Kamil, and the remixes created by DJ Sanj. The song was shot in parts of Delhi and Kolkata.

== Critical reception ==
The song received mostly positive reviews from critics. Joginder Tuteja of Bollywood Hungama noted, "With Rahat Fateh Ali Khan at the helm of affairs and Irshad Kamil spinning his words well, the song has melody as its forte and doesn't bear any Western influence whatsoever. Bringing on further variety in the album, 'Ajj Din Chadheya' has an old world charm."

Chandrima Pal of Rediff.com stated, "Rahat Fateh Ali Khan is the perfect choice for the soulful melody called Aaj Din Chadheya. The guitar-driven arrangement with highlights of accordion and harmonica make this song of loving and longing a very relaxed listen." Ruchika Kher from Hindustan Times noted, "A romantic song that is extremely soothing to the ears, Aaj Din... strikes a chord with the listeners. The song has a feel-good factor."

== Accolades ==
Award	Date of ceremony	Category	Recipient(s)	Result	Ref.
Filmfare Awards	27 February 2010	Best Music Director	Pritam	Nominated	
Filmfare Awards	27 February 2010	Best Lyricist	Irshad Kamil	Won	
Filmfare Awards	27 February 2010	Best Male Playback Singer	Rahat Fateh Ali Khan	Nominated	
Global Indian Music Academy Awards	10 November 2010	Best Engineer - Film Album	Eric Pillai	Won	
International Indian Film Academy Awards	5 June 2010	Best Music Director	Pritam	Won	
International Indian Film Academy Awards	5 June 2010	Best Lyricist	Irshad Kamil	Nominated	
International Indian Film Academy Awards	5 June 2010	Best Male Playback Singer	Rahat Fateh Ali Khan	Nominated	
Producers Guild Film Awards	8 January 2010	Best Music Director	Pritam	Won	
Screen Awards	9 January 2010	Best Music Director	Pritam	Nominated	
Screen Awards	9 January 2010	Best Male Playback Singer	Rahat Fateh Ali Khan	Won	
Screen Awards	9 January 2010	Best Sound Design	Dileep Subramanian	Nominated	
