= Cheeni Kum =

2007 Indian film by R. Balki

- Theatrical release poster
- Directed by: R. Balki
- Written by: R. Balki
- Produced by: Sunil Manchanda
- Starring: Amitabh Bachchan; Tabu; Paresh Rawal; Zohra Sehgal; Swini Khara
- Cinematography: P. C. Sreeram
- Edited by: Chandan Arora
- Music by: Ilaiyaraaja
- Production company: MAD Entertainment Ltd.
- Distributed by: Eros International
- Release dates: 21 May 2007 (Cannes); 22 May 2007 (Leicester Square); 25 May 2007 (India)
- Running time: 140 minutes
- Country: India
- Language: Hindi
- Budget: ₹11 crore
- Box office: est.₹32.03 crore

Cheeni Kum (transl. Less Sugar) is a 2007 Indian Hindi-language romantic comedy film directed by R. Balki and starring Amitabh Bachchan, Tabu, Paresh Rawal, Zohra Sehgal, and Swini Khara.

Cheeni Kum premiered at the 2007 Cannes Film Festival on 21 May 2007, and premiered at the Leicester Square on 22 May 2007 and it was released theatrically on 25 May 2007. Made on a production budget of ₹11 crore, it grossed a total of ₹32.03 crore at the box office, thus proving to be a commercial success. It received positive reviews from critics upon release, with praise for its direction, story, screenplay, dialogues, soundtrack and performances of the cast.

At the 53rd Filmfare Awards, Cheeni Kum received 1 award – Best Actress (Critics) (Tabu).

== Plot ==
Buddhadev Gupta (Amitabh Bachchan) is the 64-year-old owner and executive chef of Spice 6, London's top Indian restaurant. He lives with his 85-year-old mother (Zohra Sehgal), and his only friend and confidante is his 9-year-old neighbour, 'Sexy' (Swini Khara), who is diagnosed with leukemia. Buddha is arrogant and egocentric, often rude to his chefs and sarcastic to those around him. His confidence is crushed when during a dinner service one evening at his restaurant, a hyderabadi zafrani pulao gets sent back for being 'sweet', leading Buddha to humiliate the woman who ordered the dish, arguing that his restaurant is the finest in London. When she sends her pulao to Buddha's restaurant, made arguably better than at Spice 6, Buddha eventually finds the chef who prepared the dish incorrectly and fires him.

Buddha runs into the woman once again after she decides to come back to his restaurant, 34-year-old Nina Verma (Tabu) from India. He tries to apologize but is unable to. They slowly fall in love despite their glaring contrast in age, character, and attitude. They decide to get married, and Buddha goes to Delhi to meet Nina's father, Omprakash Verma (Paresh Rawal), conveniently leaving out the detail that Buddha is older than him. He quickly finds out and is horrified, and he attempts to dissuade his daughter from marrying Buddha by going on a Gandhi-inspired hunger strike until she relents. Buddha and Nina argue over this constantly, being the main hang-up in their relationship, and Buddha leaves their home feeling heartbroken, only to also find out that Sexy has now died from her cancer. In the meantime, Omprakash has begrudgingly agreed to Buddha and Nina's relationship, at which an overjoyed Nina comes to find Buddha at the Qutub Minar, where she finds out about Sexy as well. She consoles Buddha while he grieves his best friend and gently lets him know that her father has changed his mind.

The final scene shows Buddha and Nina having brought Buddha's mother and Nina's father to Spice 6, and Buddha bonding with Omprakash over a cricket match playing near them.

== Cast ==
- Amitabh Bachchan as Buddhadev Gupta
- Tabu as Nina Verma
- Paresh Rawal as Omprakash Verma, Nina's father
- Zohra Sehgal as Mrs. Gupta, Buddhadev's mother
- Swini Khara as Sexy, a child with leukemia
- Alexx O'Nell as the English waiter

== Soundtrack ==
Cheeni Kum

Soundtrack album by Ilaiyaraaja
- Released: 2 May 2007
- Recorded: 2006–2007
- Genre: Feature film soundtrack
- Label: Eros Music
- Producer: Ilayaraja

The score and soundtrack were composed by Ilaiyaraaja. The songs had their tunes re-used from the composer's earlier songs in other languages, while the arrangements were fresh.

Track No	Song	Singer	Notes
1	"Cheeni Kum"	Shreya Ghoshal	Based on "Mandram Vantha Thendralukku" from Mouna Ragam
2	"Baatein Hawa" (Duet)	Amitabh Bachchan, Shreya Ghoshal	Based on "Kuzhal Ootham" from Mella Thirandhathu Kadhavu
3	"Jaane Do Na"	Shreya Ghoshal	Based on "Jotheyali" from Geetha
4	"Sooni Sooni"	Vijay Prakash	Based on "Mandram Vantha Thendralukku" from Mouna Ragam
5	"Baatein Hawa" (Solo)	Shreya Ghoshal	Based on "Kuzhal Ootham" from Mella Thirandhathu Kadhavu

== Reception ==
=== Critical reception ===
Martin D'Souza of Glamsham gave the movie 4/5 stars, concluding that "There's a dash of sweetness (Tabu), the right amount of spice (Amitabh Bachchan), a proper dose of lime (Paresh Rawal), the perfect quantity of salt (Swini Khara) and a spoonful of tadka (Zohra Sehgal). A clean entertainer which can be watched by the entire family." Raja Sen of Rediff gave the movie 3.5/5 stars, stating that "This isn't a groundbreaking film, but it didn't set out to be. It's a maturely written film with great characters, tremendous performances and some fantastic moments. It could have been perfect, but the lesser said about that end the better. Watch it. A brilliant sequence involving the chef, a chemist, chhatris and chachas is absolute movie magic, and in itself well worth the price of admission. Bravo." Naresh Kumar Deoshi of Apun Ka Choice gave the movie 3/5 stars, saying that "The movie, featuring Amitabh Bachchan in yet another brilliant performance, not just entertains you with its sarcastic humor, it also touches your heart with its emotional moments. Do not miss this sugar-free spread." Taran Adarsh of Bollywood Hungama gave the movie 3/5 stars, concluding that "On the whole, CHEENI KUM is absorbing in parts. A lackluster first half gets a boost with a much energetic second half and that elevates the film to the watchable level. At the box-office, CHEENI KUM is targeted at the multiplexes mainly. Clever promos and feel-good vibes should ensure a positive run at the multiplexes." On the contrary, Rajeev Masand of CNN-IBN gave the movie 2/5 stars, stating that "So I'll go with two out of five for R. Balki's Cheeni Kum, it's an average entertainer at best. If you're a die-hard Bachchan fan, do give it a shot because he doesn't disappoint. How you wish the film didn't either!"

=== Box office ===
Cheeni Kum was a hit at the box office, grossing ₹237.5 million (US$2.5 million), despite taking a poor opening. The movie collected ₹169.7 million (US$1.8 million) net in its lifetime.

== Accolades ==
Award (Note: Awards, festivals and organizations are in alphabetical order.)	Date of ceremony (Note: Date is linked to the article about the awards held that year, wherever possible.)	Category	Recipient(s)	Result	Ref.
Filmfare Awards	16 February 2008	Best Actress (Critics)	Tabu	Won	
International Indian Film Academy Awards	6 – 8 June 2008	Best Actress	Tabu	Nominated	
International Indian Film Academy Awards	6 – 8 June 2008	Best Supporting Actress	Zohra Sehgal	Nominated	
International Indian Film Academy Awards	6 – 8 June 2008	Best Story	R. Balki	Nominated	
Producers Guild Film Awards	30 March 2008	Best Film	Cheeni Kum	Nominated	
Producers Guild Film Awards	30 March 2008	Best Actor	Amitabh Bachchan	Nominated	
Producers Guild Film Awards	30 March 2008	Best Actress	Tabu	Nominated	
Producers Guild Film Awards	30 March 2008	Best Story	R. Balki	Nominated	
Producers Guild Film Awards	30 March 2008	Best Dialogue	R. Balki	Nominated	
Screen Awards	10 January 2008	Most Promising Debut Director	R. Balki	Nominated	
Screen Awards	10 January 2008	Best Actor	Amitabh Bachchan	Nominated	
Screen Awards	10 January 2008	Best Actor (Critics)	Amitabh Bachchan	Won	
Screen Awards	10 January 2008	Best Actress	Tabu	Nominated	
Screen Awards	10 January 2008	Best Actress (Critics)	Tabu	Won	
Stardust Awards	25 January 2008	Hottest Young Film Maker	R. Balki	Nominated	
Stardust Awards	25 January 2008	Actor of the Year – Male	Amitabh Bachchan	Nominated	
Stardust Awards	25 January 2008	Actor of the Year – Female	Tabu	Nominated	
Stardust Awards	25 January 2008	Best Supporting Actress	Zohra Sehgal	Nominated	
Stardust Awards	25 January 2008	Breakthrough Performance – Female	Swini Khara	Nominated	
Zee Cine Awards	26 April 2008	Most Promising Debut Director	R. Balki	Nominated	
Zee Cine Awards	26 April 2008	Best Actor – Male	Amitabh Bachchan	Nominated	
Zee Cine Awards	26 April 2008	Best Actor – Female	Tabu	Nominated	
Zee Cine Awards	26 April 2008	Most Promising Debut Child Artist	Swini Khara	Nominated	
