= Stardust Award for Actor of the Year – Male =

Film award in India

The Stardust Star of the Year Award – Male is chosen by the readers of the annual Stardust magazine. The award honours a star that has made an impact with their acting in a film. The first actor to receive this award was Ajay Devgan in 2003. Amitabh Bachchan has won 4 awards, Akshay Kumar has won 3 awards, while Salman Khan, Shahrukh Khan & Sanjay Dutt have 2 awards each.

== Multiple wins ==
Wins	Recipient
4	Amitabh Bachchan
3	Akshay Kumar
2	Sanjay Dutt, Salman Khan, Shahrukh Khan

== Awards ==
Year	Actor	Film
2003	Ajay Devgan	Company
2004	Sanjay Dutt	Munnabhai M.B.B.S.
2005	Abhishek Bachchan	Yuva
2006	Amitabh Bachchan	Black
2007	Sanjay Dutt	Lage Raho Munna Bhai
2008	Akshay Kumar	Heyy Babyy & Namastey London
2009	Hrithik Roshan	Jodhaa Akbar
2010	Amitabh Bachchan	Paa
2011	Akshay Kumar; Salman Khan	Housefull; Dabangg
2012	Salman Khan	Bodyguard & Ready
2013	Akshay Kumar; Shah Rukh Khan	Housefull 2, Rowdy Rathore & OMG: Oh My God! Jab Tak Hai Jaan
2014	Shah Rukh Khan	Happy New Year
2015	Amitabh Bachchan	Shamitabh & Piku
2016	Amitabh Bachchan	Pink

== See also ==
- Stardust Awards
- Bollywood
- Cinema of India
