= 2008 Zee Cine Awards =

11th Zee Cine Awards
- Date: 26 April 2008
- Site: ExCeL London
- Hosted by: Sajid Khan; Karan Johar; Dia Mirza; Gulshan Grover; Chunky Panday; Minissha Lamba

Highlights
- Best Picture: Chak De! India
- Best Direction: Aamir Khan (Taare Zameen Par)
- Best Actor: Shah Rukh Khan (Chak De! India)
- Best Actress: Kareena Kapoor (Jab We Met)
- Most awards: Taare Zameen Par (6)
- Most nominations: Om Shanti Om (15)

The 11th Zee Cine Awards ceremony honouring the winners and nominees of the best of Bollywood cinema films released in 2007. The ceremony was held on 26 April 2008 at ExCeL London, London.

Om Shanti Om led the ceremony with 15 nominations, followed by Guru with 10 nominations, and Chak De! India, Life in a... Metro and Taare Zameen Par with 9 nominations each.

Taare Zameen Par won 6 awards, including Best Director (for Aamir Khan) and Best Actor (Critics) (for Darsheel Safary, thus becoming the most-awarded film at the ceremony.

== Awards ==
The winners and nominees have been listed below. Winners are listed first, highlighted in boldface, and indicated with a double dagger (‡).

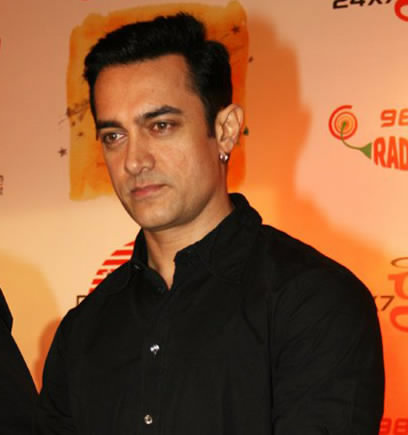
Aamir Khan — Best Director winner for Taare Zameen Par

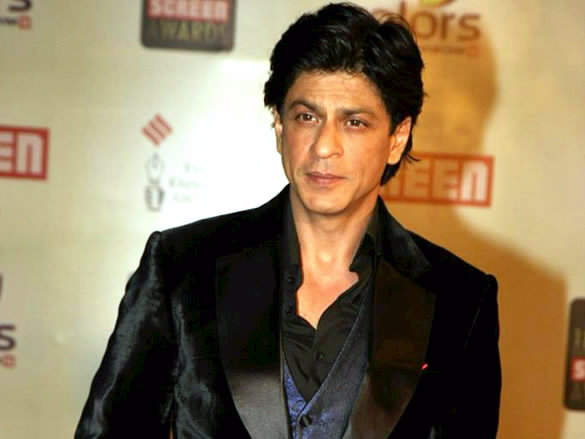
Shah Rukh Khan — Best Actor winner for Chak De! India

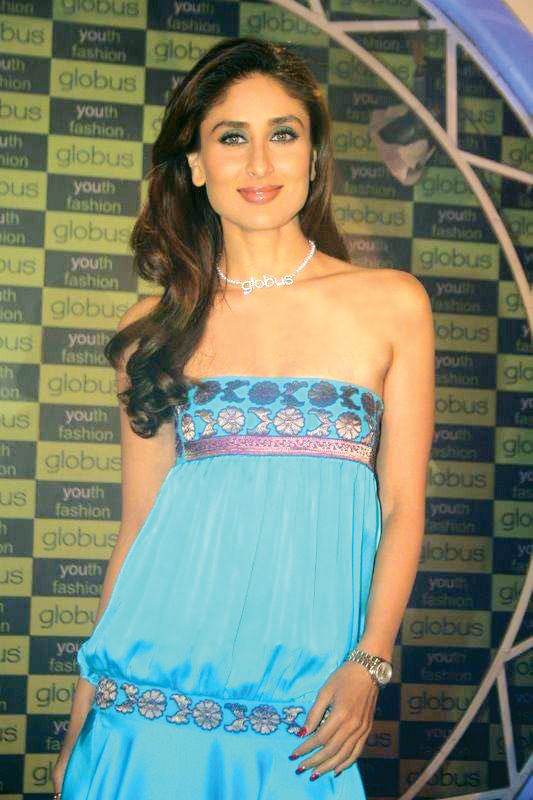
Kareena Kapoor — Best Actress winner for Jab We Met

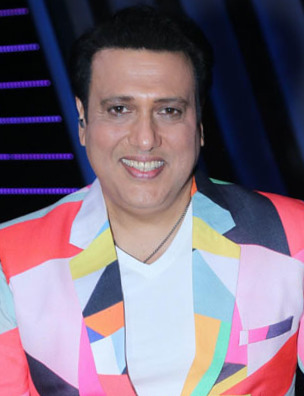
Govinda — Best Supporting Actor winner for Partner

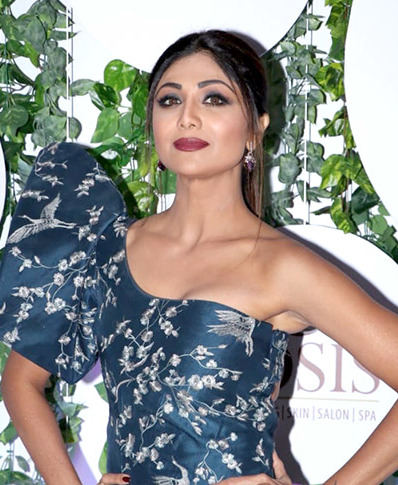
Shilpa Shetty — Best Supporting Actress winner for Life in a... Metro

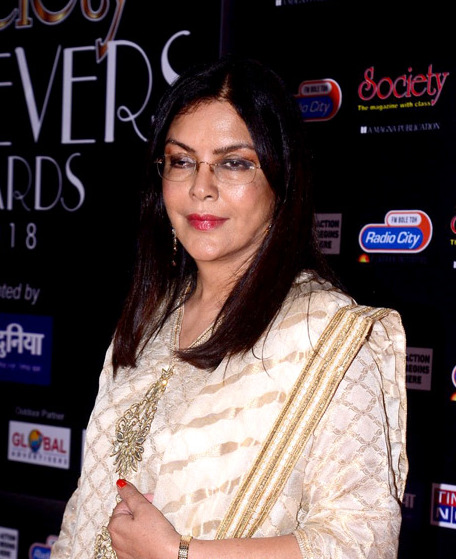
Zeenat Aman — Lifetime Achievement Awardee

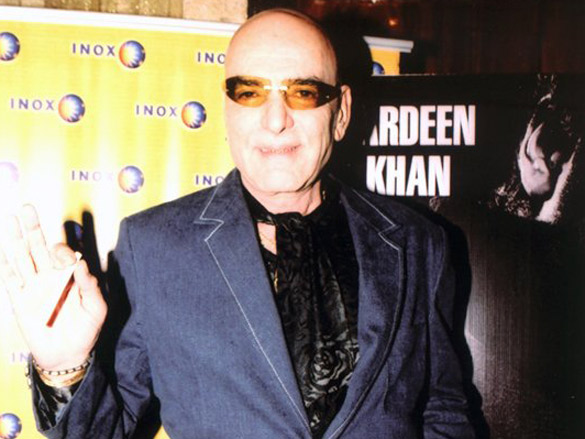
Feroz Khan — Lifetime Achievement Awardee

=== Popular Awards ===
Best Film	Best Director
**Chak De! India**‡; Guru; Jab We Met; Life in a... Metro; Om Shanti Om; Taare Zameen Par	**Aamir Khan – Taare Zameen Par**‡; Anurag Basu – Life in a... Metro; Farah Khan – Om Shanti Om; Imtiaz Ali – Jab We Met; Mani Ratnam – Guru; Shimit Amin – Chak De! India
Best Actor – Male	Best Actor – Female
**Shah Rukh Khan – Chak De! India as Hockey Coach Kabir Khan**‡; Abhishek Bachchan – Guru as Gurukant "Guru" Desai; Akshay Kumar – Namastey London as Arjun; Amitabh Bachchan – Cheeni Kum as Buddhadev Singh; Shah Rukh Khan – Om Shanti Om as Omprakash Makhija aka OK 'Om Kapoor'; Shahid Kapoor – Jab We Met as Aditya D. Kashyap	**Kareena Kapoor – Jab We Met as Geet Dhillon**‡; Aishwarya Rai Bachchan – Guru as Sujata Desai; Deepika Padukone – Om Shanti Om as Sandhya "Sandy" Bansal aka Shantipriya; Katrina Kaif – Namastey London as Jasmeet; Tabu – Cheeni Kum as Nina Verma; Vidya Balan – Bhool Bhulaiyaa as Avni S. Chaturvedi
Best Actor in a Supporting Role – Male	Best Actor in a Supporting Role – Female
**Govinda – Partner as Bhaskar Devakar Chaudhary**‡; Aamir Khan – Taare Zameen Par as Ram Shankar Nikumbh; Bobby Deol – Jhoom Barabar Jhoom as Steve Singh/Satvinder; Irrfan Khan – Life in a... Metro as Monty; Mithun Chakraborty – Guru as Manikdas Desai; Shreyas Talpade – Om Shanti Om as Pappu Master	**Shilpa Shetty – Life in a... Metro as Shikha**‡; Chitrashi Rawat – Chak De! India as Komal Chautala; Konkona Sen Sharma – Life in a... Metro as Shruti Ghosh; Lara Dutta – Jhoom Barabar Jhoom as Anaida Raza/Laila; Tisca Chopra – Taare Zameen Par as Maya Awasthi
Best Performance in a Negative Role	Best Actor in a Comic Role
**Arjun Rampal – Om Shanti Om as Mukesh "Mike" Mehra**‡; Neil Nitin Mukesh – Johnny Gaddaar as Johnny; Pavan Malhotra – Black Friday as Tiger Memon; Shilpa Shukla – Chak De! India as Bindiya Naik; Vivek Oberoi – Shootout at Lokhandwala as Mahindra "Maya" Dolas	**Vinay Pathak – Bheja Fry as Bharat Bhushan**‡; Anil Kapoor – Welcome as Sagar "Majnu" Pandey; Nana Patekar – Welcome as Uday Shankar Shetty; Riteish Deshmukh – Heyy Babyy as Tanmay Joglekar; Tusshar Kapoor – Dhol as Sameer "Sam" Arya
Best Music Director	Best Lyrics
**A. R. Rahman – Guru**‡; Pritam – Life in a... Metro; Pritam, Sandesh Shandilya – Jab We Met; Sajid–Wajid – Partner; Vishal–Shekhar – Om Shanti Om	**Prasoon Joshi – "Maa" – Taare Zameen Par**‡; Gulzar – "Tere Bina" – Guru; Javed Akhtar – "Main Agar Kahoon" – Om Shanti Om; Sameer Anjaan – "Jab Se Tere Naina" – Saawariya; Sayeed Quadri – "In Dino" – Life in a... Metro
Best Male Playback Singer	Best Female Playback Singer
**Shaan – "Jab Se Tere Naina" – Saawariya**‡; KK – "Aankhon Mein Teri" – Om Shanti Om; Soham Chakrabarty – "In Dino" – Life in a... Metro; Sonu Nigam – "Main Agar Kahoon" – Om Shanti Om; Sukhwinder Singh, Salim–Sulaiman, Marianne D'Cruz – "Chak De! India" – Chak De! India	**Shreya Ghoshal – "Barso Re" – Guru**‡; Mahalakshmi Iyer – "Bol Na Halke Halke" – Jhoom Barabar Jhoom; Mahalakshmi Iyer – "Tenu Leke" – Salaam-e-Ishq; Shreya Ghoshal – "Yeh Ishq Haye" – Jab We Met
Best Track of the Year	Most Promising Director
**"Mauja Hi Mauja" – Jab We Met**‡; "Barso Re" – Guru; "Bhool Bhulaiyaa" – Bhool Bhulaiyaa; "Dard-e-Disco" – Om Shanti Om; "Do You Wanna Partner" – Partner; "In Dino" – Life in a... Metro	**Aamir Khan – Taare Zameen Par**‡; Feroz Abbas Khan – Gandhi, My Father; R. Balki – Cheeni Kum; Reema Kagti – Honeymoon Travels Pvt. Ltd.; Sajid Khan – Heyy Babyy
Best Male Debut	Best Female Debut
**Ranbir Kapoor – Saawariya as Raj**‡; Himesh Reshammiya – Aap Kaa Surroor as HR; Neil Nitin Mukesh – Johnny Gaddaar as Johnny	**Deepika Padukone – Om Shanti Om as Shantipriya/Sandhya "Sandy" Bansal**‡; Jiah Khan – Nishabd as Jiya; Sonam Kapoor – Saawariya as Sakeena
Most Promising Debut Child Artist
**Darsheel Safary – Taare Zameen Par as Ishaan Nandkishore Awasthi**‡; Dhruv Piyush Panjuani – Apna Asmaan as Buddhi; Swini Khara – Cheeni Kum as Sexy

=== Technical Awards ===
Best Story	Best Screenplay
**Amole Gupte – Taare Zameen Par**‡	**Imtiaz Ali – Jab We Met**‡
Best Dialogue	Best Cinematography
**Jaideep Sahni – Chak De! India**‡	**Sudeep Chatterjee – Chak De! India**‡
Best Choreography	Best Action
**Farah Khan – Om Shanti Om**‡	**Parvez Khan – Johnny Gaddaar**‡
Best Editing	Best Art Direction
**Amitabh Shukla – Chak De! India**‡	**Nitin Chandrakant Desai – Gandhi, My Father**‡
Best Background Score	Best Sound Recording
**A. R. Rahman – Guru**‡	**Baylon Fonseca – Shootout at Lokhandwala**‡
Best Costume Design	Best Film Processing
**Manish Malhotra, Karan Johar – Om Shanti Om**‡	**ADLABS – Namastey London**‡
Best Special Effects (Visual)
**Red Chillies VFX – Om Shanti Om**‡

=== Critics' awards ===
Best Film
**Anil Kapoor – Gandhi, My Father**‡
Best Actor – Male	Best Actor – Female
**Darsheel Safary – Taare Zameen Par as Ishaan Nandkishore Awasthi**‡	**Shefali Shah – Gandhi, My Father as Kasturba Gandhi**‡
Critics Special Award
**Neil Nitin Mukesh**‡

=== Special awards ===
Lifetime Achievement Award
**Zeenat Aman**	**Feroz Khan**
Zee Icon award
**Shah Rukh Khan**
Zee Cinema Entertainer of the Year
**Riteish Deshmukh**
British Indian Actor Award
**Katrina Kaif**
Bollywood Queen Award
**Gauri Khan**

== Superlatives ==
Multiple nominations
Nominations	Film
15	Om Shanti Om
10	Guru
9	Chak De! India
9	Life in a... Metro
9	Taare Zameen Par
8	Jab We Met
4	Cheeni Kum
4	Gandhi, My Father
4	Saawariya
3	Jhoom Barabar Jhoom
3	Johnny Gaddaar
3	Namastey London
3	Partner
2	Bhool Bhulaiyaa
2	Heyy Babyy
2	Shootout at Lokhandwala
2	Welcome

Multiple wins
Awards	Film
6	Taare Zameen Par
5	Chak De! India
5	Om Shanti Om
3	Gandhi, My Father
3	Guru
3	Jab We Met
2	Saawariya
