= Shamitabh =

2015 film by R. Balki

- Theatrical release poster
- Directed by: R. Balki
- Written by: R. Balki
- Produced by: Sunil Lulla; Gauri Shinde; Rakesh Jhunjhunwala; R. K. Damani; Abhishek Bachchan
- Starring: Dhanush; Amitabh Bachchan; Akshara Haasan
- Cinematography: P. C. Sreeram
- Edited by: Hemanti Sarkar
- Music by: Ilaiyaraaja
- Production companies: Amitabh Bachchan Corporation; Hope Productions; Eros International; Saraswati Creations
- Distributed by: Eros International; MAD Entertainment Ltd
- Release date: 6 February 2015
- Running time: 135 minutes
- Country: India
- Language: Hindi
- Budget: ₹45 crore
- Box office: ₹37 crore

Shamitabh is a 2015 Indian Hindi-language satirical drama film written and directed by R. Balki. The film stars Dhanush in the title role along with Amitabh Bachchan and debutante Akshara Haasan. The film is jointly produced by Sunil Lulla, Balki, Rakesh Jhunjhunwala, R. K. Damani, Amitabh Bachchan, Abhishek Bachchan under their respective production banners. Ilaiyaraaja composed the soundtrack album and background score, while cinematography was handled by P. C. Sreeram.

== Plot ==
Danish, a mute man from Igatpuri whose childhood dream was to become a Bollywood actor, reaches Mumbai to fulfill his dream. He tries to enter Film City but is stopped by guards. He trespasses anyway and meets an assistant director, Akshara Pandey, who is amazed by his acting. She approaches a director to request a role for Danish in a film, but the director refuses after he learns that Danish is mute.

Danish and Akshara go to a voice hospital to get his checkup, but doctors declare that his vocal chords are fully paralyzed and he cannot be treated. Akshara's father reveals a new "Live Voice Transfer Technology" exists in Finland; a chip will be fitted inside the patient's larynx which can help them "speak" (via a borrowed voice from the other person). After getting this operation done in Finland, Akshara and Danish return to Mumbai and set out to search for a person who could speak for Danish every time, when they come across an old drunkard, Amitabh Sinha, lying on the footpath. Amitabh also wanted to become an actor but was rejected because of his voice.

Danish approaches the director again, who agrees to launch him this time, but wanted him to change his name. Danish searches for a name and concludes on Shamitabh (a portmanteau of Danish and Amitabh), giving credit to the person who provided him with voice. Danish makes two films and turns out to be a hit actor. to which Amitabh realizes was only because of him. An ego problem between the two starts to rise.

Danish arrives at London to deliver a speech which Amitabh voices for him, but Danish treats him like a servant. Amitabh later becomes inebriated and is arrested after attacking a police officer, but Danish bails him out. When the duo return to Mumbai, journalists ask Danish if he is apologetic about the incident. Danish tells Amitabh to say that he apologizes from his servant, Amitabh's side. Instead, Amitabh mischievously makes him reply in negative, much to Danish's fury. The duo parts ways; Danish plays a mute person in his next film, while Amitabh dubs for another actor in a different film. Both films fail.

Akshara makes both Amitabh and Danish realize they are nothing without each other and gets them together for a film titled Sorry, which she is directing. Meanwhile, Akshara and Danish tell that they like each other. While Amitabh and Danish are on the way to the venue of the press meet for Sorry, a car accident occurs, where Danish is killed and Amitabh becomes mute after his larynx is damaged.

Some time later, Amitabh paces around Danish's grave with the script of Sorry, imagining that Danish is still alive and practicing his lines for the film.

== Cast ==
- Dhanush as Danish/Shamitabh
- Amitabh Bachchan as Amitabh Sinha/Robert
- Akshara Haasan as Akshara Pandey
- Ivan Rodrigues as Anay Verma
- Abhimanyu Chaudhary as Reporter Akash Mehta
- Rajeev Ravindranathan as Media Reporter
- Uday Tikekar as Dr. Pandey

=== Cameo appearances ===
- Rukmini Vijayakumar
- Rekha
- Abhinaya
- Rohit Shetty
- Abhishek Bachchan
- Karan Johar
- Mahesh Bhatt
- Anurag Basu
- Rakeysh Omprakash Mehra
- Rajkumar Hirani
- Gauri Shinde
- Javed Akhtar
- Boney Kapoor
- Ekta Kapoor
- Vandita Shrivastava
- Tanuka Laghate
- Arun Shekhar as writer
- Ujjwal Gauraha as Superstar

== Production ==
=== Development ===
In August 2013, reports announced that Dhanush would play the lead role in R. Balki's next film. But Balki denied them as rumors, citing that they may have arisen when he had shot for an advertisement featuring. In November 2013, Bachchan and Dhanush were announced as stars. The film also marked the acting debut of Kamal Haasan's second daughter, Akshara Haasan. In addition to portraying one of the film's central characters, Bachchan had also bankrolled the venture. In May 2014, Balki revealed that the film would be titled Shamitabh, which also sounded similar to the Bollywood star's name, whilst also revealing that half the film's shooting had been completed. Bachchan lent his voice to Dhanush, who plays a dumb aspiring actor in the film. The film's title derived from the duo's names in which 'Sh' from Dhanush was added as a prefix to Amitabh, therefore becoming Shamitabh.

=== Casting ===
Besides the lead cast, it was confirmed in February 2014 that actor Rajeev Ravindranathan would appear in a small role in the film. Rajeev confirmed the same again in July 2014. In August 2014, it was reported that director Mahesh Bhatt had acted in a cameo role in the film. Later it was reported that not only Mahesh Bhatt, but Karan Johar, Anurag Basu, Rakesh Omprakash Mehra, Rajkumar Hirani, Gauri Shinde, along with lyricist Javed Akhtar and producers Boney Kapoor and Ekta Kapoor would do cameos in the film. Actress Abhinaya of Nadodigal (2009) fame was selected to play a crucial role in the film. Actress Rekha was selected to play a supporting role. Vandita Shrivastava, an MBA-turned-actress, stated that she had a role in the film.

=== Filming ===
Principal photography commenced in February 2014 in Igatpuri. Amitabh Bachchan began shooting for his portions in the film in April 2014. Shamitabh became the first Bollywood film to be shot in the Lapland region of Finland and in Helsinki. The crew shot some scenes at the Seven Hills Hospital, the same place where Bachchan underwent two abdominal surgeries and saw the birth of Aaradhya, his granddaughter. Some scenes were also shot in London. The team took a break in mid-July 2014 to celebrate Dhanush's birthday and the success of his 25th film, Velaiyilla Pattathari (2014). In mid-August 2014, Amitabh Bachchan stated that he had completed his portions for the film, whilst also confirming that 90% percent of the film's shooting had been completed. Dhanush reportedly did a few dastardly stunts in the film. The film's cinematographer P. C. Sreeram was fascinated by Akshara's acting capability and lack of nervousness while shooting with Dhanush and Bachchan and lauded her as a "woman of substance". Akshara did her own choreography for her dance.

== Soundtrack ==
Shamitabh

Soundtrack album by Ilaiyaraaja
- Released: 16 January 2015
- Recorded: 2014–2015
- Genre: Feature film soundtrack
- Length: 25:40
- Language: Hindi
- Label: Eros Music
- Producer: Ilaiyaraaja

Ilaiyaraaja chronology
Touring Talkies (2015)	Shamitabh (2015)	Mythri (2015)

The soundtrack album and background score were composed by Ilaiyaraaja. Illaiyaraaja began work for the film's songs on 6 January 2014 in Mumbai. Bachchan had lent his voice to a song in the film. The song "Stereophonic Sannata" was reused from the song "Aasaiya Kaathula" from the Tamil movie Johnny.

Track-List
No.	Title	Lyrics	Singer(s)	Length
1.	"Ishq E Phillum"	Swanand Kirkire	Suraj Jagan	04:30
2.	"Sha Sha Sha Mi Mi Mi"	Kausar Munir	Caralisa Monteiro	05:20
3.	"Piddly Si Baatein"	Swanand Kirkire	Amitabh Bachchan	05:09
4.	"Stereophonic Sannata"	Swanand Kirkire	Shruti Haasan	04:59
5.	"Thappad"	Swanand Kirkire	Suraj Jagan, Earl D'Souza, Ilaiyaraaja	04:07
6.	"Lifebuoy"	Swanand Kirkire	Suraj Jagan	01:54
Total length:				25:40

== Promotion and release ==
The film released worldwide on 6 February 2015 and underperformed at the box office.

The first look of the lead actors Bachchan and Dhanush were released on 23 July 2014, and 25 July 2014, respectively. A video trailer of Bachchan sitting in a toilet and singing "piddly si baatein", a catchy, peppy song while holding the script, was released on 31 December 2014. An extended version of the trailer was released on 2 January 2015. Bachchan had been reportedly seen sporting a rugged look and wearing shabby clothes, Bachchan found the look quite difficult to preserve throughout the shooting of the film. Bachchan described every film he made with Balki as "novel, out of the ordinary and most challenging" and Shamitabh is "no different". A still featuring the lead actors was released by Amitabh Bachchan on Twitter on 20 August 2014. Eros International distributed the film worldwide.

== Critical reception ==
The film received mixed reviews from critics and audience. On the review aggregator website Rotten Tomatoes, 50% of 14 critics' reviews are positive, with an average rating of 5.4/10.

Srijana Mitra Das of The Times of India gave it 3.5 stars out of 5 and stated, "Shamitabh has a doubly dramatic act – but less emotion". Indian Express gave the movie 2 stars. Rajeev Masand of IBNLIVe gave the movie 2.5 stars stating "The promising film comes undone by the curse of the second half". The Guardian gave average reviews describing the movie "Amitabh Bachchan in affectionate but incoherent satire".
