= Ki & Ka =

2016 Indian romantic comedy film written, directed and produced by R. Balki

- Theatrical release poster
- Directed by: R. Balki
- Written by: R. Balki
- Produced by: R. Balki; R. K. Damani; Rakesh Jhunjhunwala; Sunil Lulla
- Starring: Kareena Kapoor Khan; Arjun Kapoor
- Cinematography: P. C. Sreeram
- Edited by: Chandan Arora
- Music by: Songs: Ilaiyaraaja; Meet Bros; Mithoon; Yo Yo Honey Singh; Background Score: Ilaiyaraaja
- Production companies: Eros International; Hope Productions
- Distributed by: Eros International
- Release date: 1 April 2016
- Running time: 126 minutes
- Country: India
- Language: Hindi
- Box office: ₹100.33 crore(worldwide gross)

Ki & Ka (transl. Hers & His) is a 2016 Indian Hindi-language romantic comedy film written, directed and produced by R. Balki. The film stars Kareena Kapoor Khan and Arjun Kapoor. It was released theatrically on 1 April 2016 to mixed reviews and became a hit, grossing over ₹100.33 crore (US$10 million) worldwide.

== Plot ==
Kia is a motivated, driven woman who aims to become successful in the business world and also wishes that more women aspire to prosper in their careers. Kabir is the laid-back son of a successful building constructor, who does not wish to take over his father's company or inherit his wealth.

The pair meet, quickly become friends, and gradually fall in love. They realise that Kabir's preference to stay at home fits perfectly with Kia's wish to climb up the corporate ladder. The couple marries, and Kabir becomes a ghar jamai after the disapproval of his father. Kia and Kabir establish a relationship where Kabir handles the daily household affairs, while Kia is the main breadwinner. Kia rises quickly in her career, and she is soon interviewed about her success. During the interview, Kia mentions her 'unusual' marriage and her husband's role in their household. The interviewer is impressed by this and requests a meeting with Kabir. While being questioned, Kabir explains that it does not matter if ki (feminine Hindi pronoun) takes up the role of ka (masculine Hindi pronoun), and ka takes up the role of ki.

The interview is very well received, and Kabir is asked to hold many more seminars and speeches on gender equality and modern marriages. Kabir's busy schedule causes a strain in the marriage, causing Kia to become jealous of her husband's newfound fame. She accuses Kabir of using their relationship to get recognition and publicity, and asks him to stop making public appearances.

While Kia is in the US, attending a work event, Kabir is invited to his college reunion and is pressured by a friend into giving another interview, which is broadcast on TV. Film actress Jaya Bachchan sees this interview, and asks her husband, superstar Amitabh Bachchan, to call Kabir and organise a meeting with him. Jaya is highly impressed with the story of the couple's unconventional marriage. Kia receives news of this meeting while in the US, causing more arguments between her and Kabir. Meanwhile, Kia's mother is taken to the hospital after collapsing, causing her to rush back to India.

Once back home, Kia accuses Kabir of using her, saying that he used their relationship for his own profit. Kia further condemns Kabir for gaining fame without working, as she feels that her hard work and successful career are going unnoticed. Dejected, Kabir does not defend himself and starts packing to leave. Kia comes across a gift that Jaya gave to Kabir for his wife, and also a letter written by the actress, in which she congratulates the pair and says that to be a man who maintains a household rather than work is a brave choice, but to be the wife of such a man is an even harder choice. Kia's mother also confronts her about her jealousy and says that it is the reason for the couple's many fights. Kia realizes that she has been unfairly tough on Kabir and apologizes to him for her behavior and temperament. The couple reconciles and finds a happy compromise. Kabir's father, who has come to appreciate Kia's business acumen and drive, decides to make her the CEO of his company.

== Cast ==
- Kareena Kapoor Khan as Kia "Ki" Sahni Bansal
- Arjun Kapoor as Kabir "Ka" Bansal
- Swaroop Sampat as Mamta Sahni
- Rajit Kapur as Kamlesh Kumar Bansal
- Amitabh Bachchan as Himself (cameo appearance)
- Jaya Bachchan as Herself (cameo appearance)

== Production ==
=== Development ===
Balki finished the script in July 2015. The film derives its title from linguistic gender divisions of the Hindi language found in the words "ladki" and "ladka", meaning "girl" and "boy". He said, ""In Hindi not just human beings but also nonliving objects have gender. Everybody and everything is categorised. But this film, like the couple's marriage, underlines the fact that Ki and Ka as genders don't matter."

== Release ==
The early estimate for the film's box office revenue on the first day was around ₹67.5 million (US$700,000) net. The film managed to pick up record collections of ₹72.5 million (US$750,000) approximately on the first day. It earned ₹82.5 million (US$860,000) on second day. The film earned ₹92.5 million (US$960,000) on third day. The film had a decent weekend, though the trend was not great for a content urban film. The weekend business of Ki & Ka was ₹248 million (US$2.6 million). Ki & Ka had the normal Monday drop of around 50%. A ₹35.0 million (US$360,000) nett plus Monday is reasonable for the film. Ki & Ka held very well on 5th day with a very limited drop of around 6–7%, film earned ₹32.5 million (US$340,000) on 5th day. The film had a decent first week of ₹370 million (US$3.8 million) nett approx. in India. The film earned ₹390 million (US$4.0 million) in eight days.

== Soundtrack ==
Ki & Ka

Soundtrack album by: Ilaiyaraaja; Meet Bros; Yo Yo Honey Singh; Mithoon
- Released: 15 February 2016
- Recorded: Meet Bros Recording Studio, Mumbai; Prasad Studio, Chennai
- Genre: Feature film soundtrack
- Length: 24:03
- Label: T-Series

Singles from Ki and Ka
- 1. "High Heels Te Nache" Released: 21 February 2016

The soundtrack album features songs composed by Meet Bros for the T-Series label besides having an original song composed by Balki's regular collaborator Ilaiyaraaja, who has also composed the background score of the movie.

Lyrics have been penned by Kumaar, Amitabh Bhattacharya and Sayeed Quadri. The soundtrack was released on 25 February 2016.

No.	Title	Lyrics	Music	Singer(s)	Length
1.	"High Heels Te Nache"	Kumaar, Alfaaz	Meet Bros, Yo Yo Honey Singh	Jaz Dhami, Yo Yo Honey Singh, Aditi Singh Sharma	03:32
2.	"Ji Huzoori"	Sayeed Quadri	Mithoon	Mithoon, Deepali Sathe, Arun Daga	05:26
3.	"Most Wanted Munda"	Kumaar	Meet Bros	Meet Bros, Earl Edgar, Dev Negi	03:28
4.	"Foolishq"	Amitabh Bhattacharya	Ilaiyaraaja	Shreya Ghoshal, Armaan Malik	04:29
5.	"Pump It (The Workout Song)"	Kumaar	Meet Bros	Meet Bros, Neha Kakkar, Nakash Aziz	03:59
6.	"Kabir Most Wanted Munda"	Kumaar	Meet Bros	Meet Bros, Papon, Arjun Kapoor, Neeti Mohan	03:10
Total length:					24:03

== Critical reception ==
Critic Rajeev Masand rated the film 2/5, writing, "Ki & Ka arrives with a curious premise, but Balki fails to flesh it out into an engaging film. I was especially pleased to see Kareena Kapoor sink her teeth into a solid role after what seems like an eternity. Arjun Kapoor deserves credit for taking a role that few male stars would, but both actors are let down by the inert writing." Anupama Chopra also rated it 2/5. She reasoned that "One of the enduring problems with Balki's films persists – his crackling concept runs out of steam. It's almost as if he spends so much of his creative energy coming up with the high-wire idea that he has none left to flesh out the narrative around it." Bollywood Hungama gave the film 3 stars out of 5, and stated, "On the whole, Ki & Ka is a cleverly crafted feel-good film that packs all the emotions. Though it has strong performances by both Arjun and Kareena, the film is bound to draw extreme reactions from the orthodox audiences who may find the premise difficult to digest. It is an urban progressive film and should appeal more to women and young married couples." Shubhra Gupta of The Indian Express gave the film 2 stars and termed it as "rocky" while commenting that "The film is fun when it is setting up the roles. But the execution, as it goes along, gets rocky. Much of it stays episodic, and starts reinforcing the very stereotypes it set out to negate. The problem is the film's unwillingness to go the mile. She also noted that it could have been more "sharper" and "deeper". Rohit Vats from Hindustan Times gave the film a rating of 2.5 and noted that film has a lot of drama and summarized, "There is no denying that Ki & Ka has a noble concept, but hasn't the director very conveniently confined himself to a comfort zone where he only needs to break some generalised stereotypes such as ‘women can't be ambitious’ or ‘men can't cook at home’ or ‘a woman's career is finished after pregnancy’? Ki & Ka isn't a strong voice against gender stereotyping, but it's one of its kind in mainstream Hindi film industry, and that makes it notice-worthy." Meena Iyer of The Times of India gave the film 4 stars and stated, "Kareena is terrific, Arjun, endearing. But Balki's writing is inconsistent. A few scenes leave you misty-eyed, but for the most part, the stock situations are banal. Yet, Ki and Ka is worth a ticket because it tells shows how there is nothing wrong with the man wearing the apron and the women wearing her ambition."

Sukanya Verma of Rediff.com gave it 2.5 stars while noting, "Ki & Ka is obviously taken in by its liberal notions but fails to realise that it's not so uncommon in today's urban context where lots of working men and women share both their professional and personal duties." Sarita A Tanwar of Daily News & Analysis gave it 2.5 stars and described the film as "stretched" and "cheesy" but also called it "a daring film" while interpreting it as "The best thing about the film is that it questions gender roles that we impose on ourselves and each other. But, the film loses momentum mid-way. The idea is stretched too thin and the climax is cheesy. It's enjoyable when it's not trite. You might take to it if you are the sort that enjoys clichés." Pallavi Patra from Zee News gave it 2 stars and mentioned it as "trite enterprise" while summarizing the film as "Ki & Ka is a seemingly funny enterprise with a feminist theme gone awry. It's not the theme that is at trouble here but a laid-back script coupled with an ostensibly manufactured chemistry between its promising leads. Watch it or not, Ki & Ka prefix will enjoy its dominance over the youth – but cinematic wise – not a good picture here". Saibal Chatterjee from NDTV gave the film 2 stars and called it "intermittently watchable". He noted, "A concept film that has a lot to say – Ki And Ka actually succeeds in getting a few of its points in edgewise – but the writing is below-par. As a consequence, Ki And Ka is like a string of patched-together monosyllables that never attain sustained coherence. Too much talk and very little plot progression put the skids under the film. Ki And Ka goes belly up pretty quickly never to recover fully." Ananya Bhattacharya of India Today gave a low rating of 1.5 and summarized it as "good germs of film spoilt by bad execution" and mentioned, "he film tries so hard to be what it is not that it loses way badly. The writing is not a field which Ki And Ka excels in. The film, for most part, feels like a rehearsal of sorts. Both Arjun and Kareena look like they are mouthing sharp, one-tone dialogues to impress the conductor of this out-of-tune opera that is Ki And Ka. The ping-pong dialogue-delivery between Arjun and Kareena is a major dampener." Anna M.M. Vetticad from Firstpost also criticised the film as "fun concept spoilt by patchy plot" while stating "Large swathes of Ki & Ka are fun, considerable sections of it are unexpectedly broad-minded, path-breaking for Bollywood and insightful. The problem is that we can section it off in this fashion. Ultimately, what fails the film is its mixed messaging and choppy texture."

== Accolades ==
Award	Date of ceremony	Category	Recipient(s) and nominee(s)	Result	Ref.
B4U Viewers Choice Awards	2017	Best Actress	Kareena Kapoor Khan	Won	
Lux Golden Rose Awards	2017	Glamorous Diva of the Year	Kareena Kapoor Khan	Won	
