= English Vinglish =

2012 film by Gauri Shinde

- Theatrical release poster
- Directed by: Gauri Shinde
- Written by: Gauri Shinde
- Produced by: Sunil Lulla; R. Balki; Rakesh Jhunjhunwala; R. K. Damani
- Starring: Sridevi; Adil Hussain; Mehdi Nebbou; Priya Anand
- Cinematography: Laxman Utekar
- Edited by: Hemanti Sarkar
- Music by: Amit Trivedi
- Production company: Hope Productions
- Distributed by: Eros International
- Release dates: 14 September 2012 (TIFF); 5 October 2012 (India)
- Running time: 134 minutes
- Country: India
- Language: Hindi
- Budget: ₹10 crore
- Box office: ₹102 crore (see below)

English Vinglish is a 2012 Indian Hindi-language comedy drama film written and directed by Gauri Shinde. The film stars Sridevi as Shashi Godbole, a small-time entrepreneur who makes snacks and sweets. Shashi enrolls in an English-speaking course to stop her husband and daughter mocking her poor English, and gains self-respect in the process. Shashi was written by Shinde, inspired by her mother. The film marked Sridevi's return to film acting after a 15-year hiatus; it also features Adil Hussain, French actor Mehdi Nebbou, and Priya Anand. Amitabh Bachchan makes a cameo appearance in the film's original version, whereas Ajith Kumar replaced him in the same portions of the film that were reshot for the Tamil-dubbed version.

English Vinglish premiered at the 2012 Toronto International Film Festival, where it received a 5-minute standing ovation. Before its release, the film was screened for the Indian press and critics. The film was released theatrically on 5 October 2012. It received universal critical acclaim, with reviewers raving Shinde's direction and screenplay, Sridevi's performance as well as the film's soundtrack and cinematography. It became a major financial success as well, grossing ₹102 crore against a budget of ₹10 crore.

English Vinglish won all of the Best Debut Director awards of 2012 for Gauri Shinde. It was shortlisted as India's official entry for the Academy Awards in the Best Foreign Language Film category. The film earned global acclaim at several international festivals and Sridevi was hailed as the "Meryl Streep of India" and the "female Rajinikanth".

== Plot ==
Shashi Godbole is a traditional Marathi homemaker in Pune who runs a small, home-based business making and selling laddoos. Despite her entrepreneurial spirit and dedication, her corporate-worker husband, Satish, and her teenage daughter, Sapna, routinely take her for granted. They frequently mock her poor English-speaking skills and treat her with casual condescension, leaving Shashi feeling deeply insecure and underconfident. Conversely, her young son, Sagar, loves her unconditionally, and her supportive mother-in-law offers her quiet words of sympathy.

When Shashi's older sister, Manu, who lives in New York City, invites the family to her daughter Meera’s wedding, it is decided that Shashi will travel to New York alone five weeks early to help organize the festivities. Satish and the children plan to join her later, closer to the wedding date. During her flight, a kind fellow passenger reassures her and gives her the confidence to navigate the journey. Upon arriving in New York, Shashi is warmly welcomed by Manu and her teenage niece, Radha. However, Shashi's transition is rocky; during a solo outing, she suffers a highly distressing experience at a local coffee shop where a rude barista berates her for her inability to order in English. Devastated, she is comforted on the street by another customer, a French chef named Laurent, who also struggles with the language.

Determined to overcome her limitations, Shashi uses her secret savings from her laddoo business to enroll in a four-week conversational English course. She navigates the unfamiliar subway system alone to reach the class, which is led by an empathetic instructor named David Fischer. Her classmates represent a diverse group of immigrants: Eva, a Mexican nanny; Salman Khan, a Pakistani taxi driver; Yu Son, a Chinese hairstylist; Ramamurthy, a Tamil software engineer; Udumbke, a quiet Afro-Caribbean man; and Laurent, the chef who comforted her. Shashi quickly stands out as a dedicated student, winning her classmates' respect with her warmth, resilience, and her delicious homemade laddoos.

As the weeks pass, Laurent becomes romantically attracted to Shashi's grace and kindness, creating emotional tension. When Laurent attempts to kiss her on a rooftop, Shashi, though flustered, gently pushes him away and flees, though she is unable to articulate in English that she is married. Radha eventually discovers Shashi's secret classes and becomes her biggest supporter, keeping the secret safe and helping her practice. Shashi studies diligently at night, watching English films and completing her homework. To graduate and receive her certificate, she must deliver a five-minute speech on the final day.

The plan falls apart when Satish and the children arrive in New York earlier than expected. One afternoon, Shashi's whole family with niece Radha, decides to visit Empire State Building, during which Shashi was going to attend her English class, while distracted by the English classes, Shashi fails to notice Sagar playing, resulting in him falling and injuring his leg. Overcome with maternal guilt and labeling herself an irresponsible mother, Shashi decides to abandon her classes to focus entirely on her family. Furthermore, the rescheduled final exam date directly conflicts with the wedding day.

On the day of the wedding, Radha secretly invites Shashi's entire English class to the reception. Satish is astonished to find his wife hosting a diverse group of international friends. When the time comes for the wedding toasts, Shashi steps forward and delivers a beautiful, heartfelt speech in English. She speaks of the sanctity of marriage and family, describing a family as a safe haven where individuals should never be mocked for their weaknesses but instead supported and respected.

Her touching words deeply humiliate Satish and Sapna, who realize the emotional damage their past disrespect had caused. Moved by her eloquence and growth, David proudly declares that Shashi has passed the course with distinction, handing her the graduation certificate in front of her family. Shashi quietly thanks Laurent for his friendship and for making her feel valued. On the flight back to India, when the flight attendant asks if she would like a newspaper, Shashi confidently and fluently requests a Hindi newspaper, leaving a proud Satish smiling beside her.

== Cast ==
- Sridevi as Shashi Godbole
- Adil Hussain as Satish Godbole
- Mehdi Nebbou as Laurent
- Priya Anand as Radha Desai
- Sulabha Deshpande as Mrs. Godbole
- Shivansh Kotia as Sagar Godbole
- Navika Kotia as Sapna Godbole
- Sujata Kumar as Manu Desai
- Rajeev R. as Ramamurthy
- Sumeet Vyas as Salman Khan
- Damian Thompson as Udumbke
- Cory Hibbs as David Fischer
- Maria Romano as Yu Son
- Ruth Aguilar as Eva
- Neelu Sodhi as Meera
- Ross Nathan as Kevin, Meera's fiancé
- Ashvin Mathew as Father Vincent
- Divya Seth Shah as Neelam, Rupa's mother
- Maria Pendolino as Jennifer

Cameo appearances

- Amitabh Bachchan as Shashi's co-passenger on flight
- Ajith Kumar as Shashi's co-passenger on flight (Tamil version)

== Production ==
=== Development ===
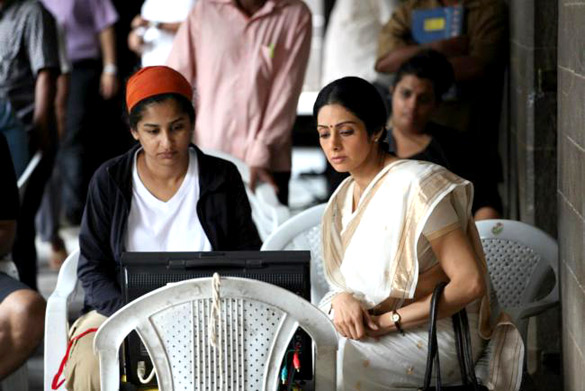
Sridevi (right) and Gauri Shinde pictured during the shoot

English Vinglish is the directorial debut of Gauri Shinde, who previously worked as an advertisement filmmaker. The story was inspired by Shinde's mother, a Marathi-speaking woman who ran a pickle business at her house in Pune. Her mother was not fluent in English, which embarrassed Shinde as a child. In an interview, Shinde said, "I made this film to say sorry to my mother." The film started development in 2011 or earlier, and several plot points and cameo appearances were decided early on. English Vinglish garnered much media coverage because of Sridevi's comeback after nearly 15 years away from film production. According to Shinde, however, it was also difficult to get support for the film due to investors' attitudes about the protagonist being a middle-aged woman, and those who were interested wished to add changes, such as a dance number, based on the hype around Sridevi that Shinde felt would not match her vision. Producer R. Balki denied reports that the film was a remake or loosely based on the old television show Zabaan Sambhalke. However, the English tuition class scenes were confirmed to be similar to the show post-release.

The film also marked the Bollywood debut of South Indian actress Priya Anand, who previously worked in the Tamil and Telugu film industries. This film marked the debut of theatre actor Ashvin Mathew. The film was being shot as of July 2011, and the principal photography concluded in October 2011. It was shot mostly in New York. Amitabh Bachchan shot for a cameo for the film for a day; Ajith Kumar reprised his role for the dubbed Tamil version without receiving payment and even flew in for the shooting at his own cost.

=== Promotion ===
The first preview of English Vinglish was launched on 14 June 2012. The official distributor Eros International posted the preview video and poster on YouTube and Twitter. A 2-minute teaser showing Sridevi reading the Censor Certificate of the film in deliberately broken English was also released. The preview received positive response and was lauded for its unique and fresh concept. The full theatrical trailer was unveiled at a special media event on 13 August 2012 coinciding with Sridevi's birthday. It received a positive response and went viral on YouTube, exceeding one million views in a week. Sridevi's performance in the trailer was highly acclaimed by her fans and the media; the Hindustan Times said, "Sridevi casts a spell in English Vinglish!"

== Music ==
The soundtrack and background score to English Vinglish was composed by Amit Trivedi and the lyrics were written by Pa. Vijay for the Tamil version, Swanand Kirkire for the Hindi version, and Krishna Chaitanya for the Telugu versions respectively. The album comprises six songs including a male and a female version of the title track "English Vinglish". Both versions of the soundtrack were released on 1 September 2012, in Mumbai, Chennai and Hyderabad.

== Release ==
=== Screenings at international film festivals ===
In July 2012, English Vinglish was selected by the 2012 Toronto International Film Festival (TIFF) and scheduled for a world premiere at the coveted Galas section of the festival. Sridevi's comeback made it a highly anticipated film and all shows at TIFF sold out during advance booking. The premiere took place at the Roy Thomson Auditorium on 14 September and was attended by Sridevi, Mehdi Nebbou, R. Balki, Gauri Shinde and other members of the cast and crew. At the end of the premiere, the full-house audience gave a 10-minute standing ovation.

After the Toronto premiere, some international media outlets hailed Sridevi as the "Meryl Streep of India". 2 weeks later, America's entertainment weekly Variety wrote in its review of English Vinglish that it found Sridevi "[d]isarmingly charming in a manner that recalls Audrey Hepburn." English Vinglish was selected to be showcased in December 2012 at the Marrakech International Film Festival; it was screened to an audience of around 15,000 viewers and was attended by Sridevi, Shinde, Balki and Nebbou.

In February 2013, English Vinglish was screened at the 63rd Berlin International Film Festival as part of Indo-German Film Week. Shinde conducted a screenwriting workshop and spoke about the film and women's rights in India.

The film had its US premiere at the 36th Portland International Film Festival. Writer and critic David D. Levine praised the film, saying "[t]hough it's not a musical, strictly speaking, there's quite a bit of music and dance, and the film is laugh-out-loud funny and heart-rending by turns ... My favorite film of this PIFF. 5 stars out of 5." In April 2013, English Vinglish was selected to play at the third Beijing International Film Festival and the International Film Festival of Panama. In May the same year, it won the 'Best Visiting Artist' award at the San Diego Film Festival. Andrew Friedenberg, director of the Cinema Society of San Diego announced that English Vinglish "dominated the voting".

=== Indian premiere ===
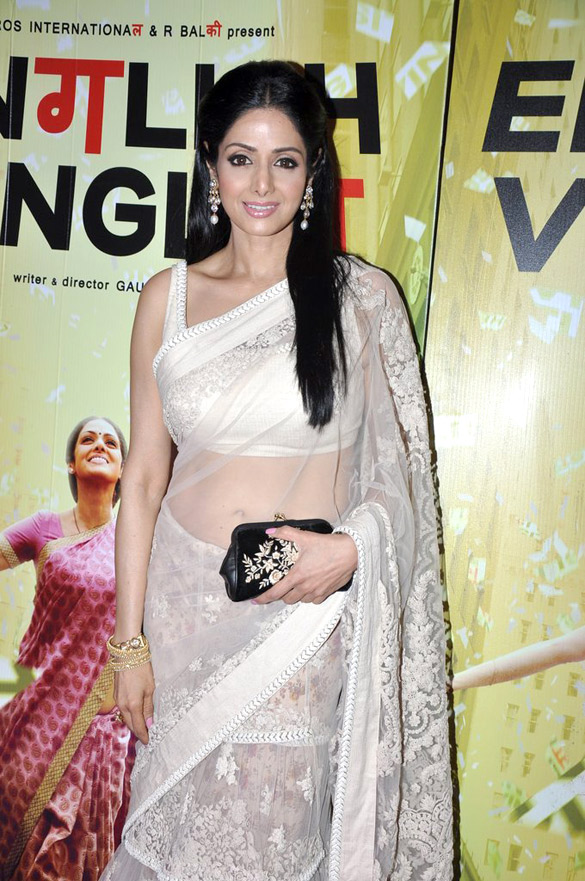
Sridevi at the premiere of English Vinglish

The Indian premiere of English Vinglish was held on 4 October 2012 and was one of the biggest premieres of that year It was organized as a red carpet event to celebrate Sridevi's return to filmmaking, and some famous Bollywood personalities attended, including directors Yash Chopra, Ramesh Sippy, Rajkumar Hirani and Ashutosh Gowariker and actors Amitabh Bachchan, Anil Kapoor, Vidya Balan, Sonakshi Sinha, Bipasha Basu, Tabu, Shilpa Shetty, Konkona Sen Sharma, Madhuri Dixit, Ayesha Takia, Kangana Ranaut and Javed Akhtar.

=== Theatrical release ===
After Eros International's efforts to release the film on 21 September 2012, English Vinglish had its worldwide theatrical release on 5 October 2012. The Hindi version was released across 739 screens, while the Tamil and Telugu versions were released on 110 and 47 screens respectively. It was released in over 250 screens overseas.

English Vinglish was theatrically released in Mainland China on 24 February 2023, the fifth anniversary of Sridevi's death, with a reported 6,000 screen premiere. Despite its low revenues upon release, the film was well received by Chinese audiences according to the Global Times.

=== World television premiere ===
On 29 December 2012, English Vinglish saw one of the biggest world television premieres on Zee Cinema. The premiere was conducted as a high-profile event, and Zee TV arranged a special press conference attended by Sridevi and Gauri Shinde. To publicize the premiere, the channel launched a free English-speaking module telephone service using IVRS, which was a success with over 25,000 calls from across India in less than a week. English Vinglish-styled signs, including 'Exit-Vexit', 'Coffee Voffee' and 'Switch off Mobile-Vobile', were posted at 900 touch-points in cafes, malls, multiplexes and airports. Zee Cinema formed partnerships with Cafe Coffee Day, Inox, Fame, Lifestyle, Shoppers Stop, Globus and Westside to market the premiere. Mohan Gopinath, business head of Zee Cinema said, "More than 2 generations of India have worshiped Sridevi. Add to that an extremely simple yet heart-warming narrative, some spot-on direction by Gauri Shinde, Balki's unmistakable touch and you have a winner on your hands."

=== Diplomatic mission ===
The movie was chosen as one of the movies screening at the Indian Film Week, held by Indian Embassy in Vietnam, in 2025. The organization of the event and its selections were highly anticipated as the engine that continues driving India–Vietnam relations. The event was held in Hà Nội, Hồ Chí Minh City, Lào Cai province, and Hà Tĩnh province.

== Box office ==
Following its release in East Asian markets during 2013–2014, the film's total worldwide gross was ₹904,267,305 (US$16,927,302) as of 2014.

English Vinglish worldwide gross revenue breakdown
Territories	Gross revenue
India	₹531 million ($9.94 million)
Overseas	$7,051,192 (₹376,680,360)
Japan	US$1,463,890
Taiwan	US$300,000
Hong Kong	US$230,871
South Korea	₩226,010,800 ($214,643)
Other territories	$4.85 million
Worldwide	₹907,680,360 ($16,991,192)

=== In India ===
The worldwide gross for English Vinglish stood at ₹750 million at the end of its third week, and reached ₹850 million (US$15.91 million) by the end of its 4th week. The film performed well in large cities, earning ₹25 million on its first day of release. The gross went to 125% and the total figures for 2 days were ₹70 million The Sunday figures were even higher; collections increased by 200% and English Vinglish ended its first weekend with ₹130 million net. The film ended its first week earning ₹210 million net.

Despite new releases Aiyyaa, Bhoot Returns and Student of the Year, the film's box office revenues remained steady. At the end of its second week, its revenue exceeded ₹300 million. Lifetime earnings for the film in India stand at over ₹400 million net, and ₹531 million (US$9.94 million) gross. English Vinglish ran for 50 days in theatres.

=== Outside India ===
According to Box Office India, English Vinglish's overseas gross figure was US$4.85 million in 2012, making it one of the top 10 highest overseas grossing Bollywood films of 2012. The film opened to a revenue of US$3.8 million overseas, bringing its worldwide total to ₹600 million (US$11.23 million) net in 2012. English Vinglish overseas collections was US$1.65 million in its first weekend. The film collected around US$3.5 million in 17 days. The movie collected a total of ₹170 million (US$3.18 million) in 10 days. The film entered the UK box office top 10, as of 13 October 2012. The film performed well overseas, collecting record figures unheard of for a heroine-oriented film. It grossed US$1.863 million in the United States and Canada, and £464,508 (US$764,333) in the United Kingdom. In Nigeria, the film grossed US$842,330.

English Vinglish created box office history in Hong Kong in May 2013, becoming the second biggest Bollywood hit in the territory after Aamir Khan's 3 Idiots (2009). It earned the distinction of being screened at Hong Kong's Director's Club: a privilege usually reserved for the best and most celebrated films in the world. English Vinglish grossed US$230,871 in Hong Kong. English Vinglish also created waves in Japan when it was first premiered in 2014. It outperformed most other films and became the second highest-grossing Hindi film in Japan, earning around $1.4 million. The film is second only to 3 Idiots which had collected US$1.6 million. It got an overwhelming response and Sridevi was hailed as the 'Female Rajinikanth of Japan'. It also grossed US$300,000 in Taiwan, making it the second biggest Bollywood film there after 3 Idiots. In South Korea, the film drew a box office audience of 31,334 viewers in 2014, grossing ₩226,010,800 (US$214,643). Its total gross in East Asia was US$2,137,302 as of 2014, bringing the film's overseas total to US$6,987,302, which in Indian rupees is ₹373,267,305 (equivalent to ₹770 million or US$8.2 million in 2026).

== Reception ==
English Vinglish received widespread critical acclaim upon release, with reviewers praising Shinde's screenplay and direction, Sridevi's performance as well as the film's soundtrack and cinematography. The Times of India gave it 4 out of 5, calling it "[e]asily one of the best films of 2012 ... [Sridevi's] performance is a masterclass for actors ... Request you to make a little place next to you, Rajkumar Hirani; Gauri Shinde has taken a bow in mainstream Bollywood." Aniruddha Guha of Daily News and Analysis also gave 4 out of 5 and said it is "among the most refreshingly novel films made in recent times ... If you're a Sridevi fan, you can't miss it. If you aren't, you still can't miss it."

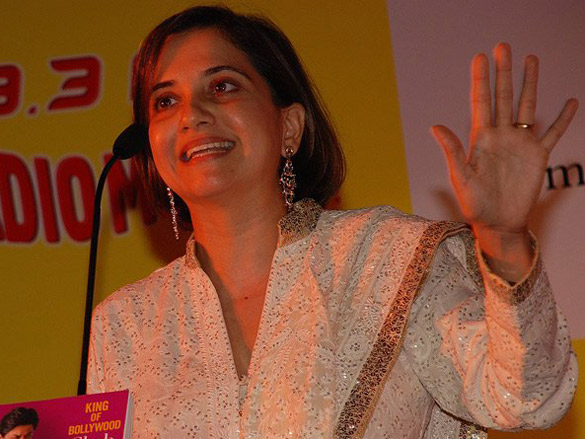
Anupama Chopra gave a 3.5 out of 5 rating and called Sridevi's performance a "triumph".

Another 4 out of 5 came from Raja Sen of Rediff, who called it "a winner all the way" and wrote "Sridevi excels in fleshing out her character." Taran Adarsh also scored it 4 out of 5 and called it "a remarkable motion picture ... A must-watch for every parent, every child. Strongly recommended!" Critic Subhash K Jha gave a 4.5 rating, and wrote that Sridevi "makes the contemporary actresses, even the coolest ones, look like jokes ... If you watch only 2 films every year make sure you see English Vinglish twice!" Rajeev Masand of CNN-IBN gave it 3.5, and said that Sridevi delivers "a performance that is nothing short of perfect ... It's warm and fuzzy, and leaves you with a big smile on your face." IMDb gave the film a score of eight out of ten.

Firstpost's Rubina Khan gave 5 out of 5, saying "Sridevi brings acting back in English Vinglish". Komal Nahta said the film was "beyond stars" and said Sridevi "makes the best comeback in Bollywood history and delivers a landmark performance". Social movie rating site MOZVO gave it 4.3 out of 5. Peter Bradshaw of The Guardian, gave it 3 out of 5, and called it "[a]n undemanding picture that goes down as well as the heroine's tasty laddoos".

Kate Taylor of The Globe and Mail gave it 2 out of 4 and wrote: "One wonders how long the neglectful Satish will remember the message of equality and gratitude if it is delivered as gently as this movie does." Amer Shoib of The Cinema Journal gave it 4/5 and called the film, "a hilarious, touching, sensitive, and sweet film that marks the triumphant come back of India's biggest female star...Sridevi." Indian columnist Shobha De tweeted, "Paresh Rawal and Sridevi—Actors of the Year! The rest are just successful stars!" and wrote a column titled 'What is that something about Sridevi?' UTV Stars called it the "Nell Gwynn of our times".

The Hollywood Reporter also gave a glowing review, and said, "Indian screen legend Sridevi triumphs in a gentle, but affecting, story of a woman's awakening self-respect ... It's no surprise that by the end of the film, Shashi will conquer her fears, but the route Shinde takes to get her there is distinctively Shashi's. The image of the newly-confident Shashi striding down a Harlem street, a takeout coffee in hand and a trench coat belted over her sari, will make you smile days after you leave the theater ... Ultimately, what make English Vinglish memorable are the small, step-by-step choices Shashi makes to transforms herself. Yes, there's grit there, but it's tempered with compassion and dignity. The way the character has been crafted by Shinde, and interpreted by Sridevi, is gloriously feminine, and uniquely Indian." Amazon Prime Video rated it 7.8 out of 10 and stated: "The challenges of an ordinary middle class woman who is not proficient with the English language, and how she comes hard."

During the movie's first screening in Vietnam in 2012, the movie draw the attention of Vietnamese public. VnExpress considered the movie had deliver the vital message, especially about cultural difference through story which could be seemed "insignificant" at first. VnExpress highly praised the storyline, the message about the need of being recognized and respected through the conflict raised from the cultural difference. Its main song Manhattan also praised by VnExpress. Former Phụ Nữ Thành phố Hồ Chí Minh (Ho Chi Minh City's Women Daily) newspaper praised its light, heart-warming and compassioning storyline, comparing with the feeling after enjoying Indian traditional sweet, ladoo. Thể thao & Văn hóa (Sport & Culture Daily) from Vietnam News Agency acknowledged the movie's own Indian "beauty", praising Gauri Shinde's delicate and feminist way of expressing Indian women's voice and desire of recognition as well as Sridevi's acting with her face expression during the movie scenes. Later, Vietnamese edition of Harper's Bazaar listed English Vinglish as one among 16 great Indian movies.

== Accolades ==
List of accolades won by English Vinglish
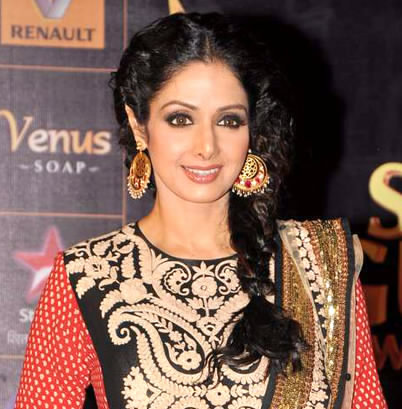
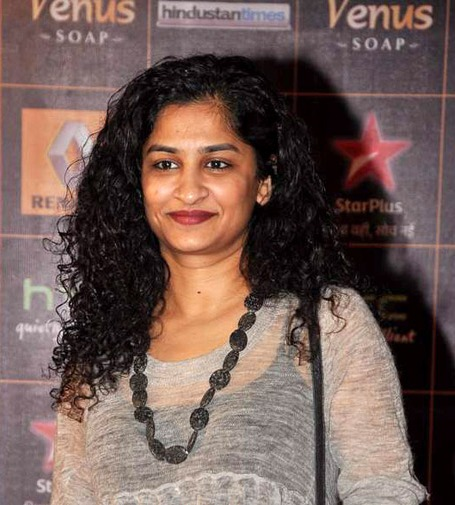
- Sridevi (left) and Gauri Shinde (right) received widespread critical acclaim for their performance and direction, respectively, in the film, garnering several awards and nominations.
Accolades
Award	Won	Nominated
- Total number of awards and nominations
Totals	11	35
- References

English Vinglish garnered awards and nominations in a variety of categories, with particular praise for its direction and Sridevi's performance. At the 58th Filmfare Awards, English Vinglish received 4 nominations, including Best Film and Best Actress (Sridevi) and won Best Debut Director (Shinde). Sridevi received Best Actress nominations at several awards ceremonies, which apart from Filmfare include IIFA, Screen, Zee Cine, and Star Guild Awards. At the 11th Stardust Awards, the film earned 5 nominations, going on to win Best Drama Actress (Sridevi) and Best Debut Director (Shinde).

Award	Category	Nominee	Result
Screen Awards	Most Promising Debut Director	Gauri Shinde	Won
Screen Awards	Best Actress	Sridevi	Nominated
Screen Awards	Best Story	Gauri Shinde	Nominated
Screen Awards	Best Screenplay	Gauri Shinde	Nominated
Screen Awards	Best Background Music	Amit Trivedi	Nominated
Screen Awards	Best Editing	Hemanti Sarkar	Nominated
Filmfare Awards	Best Debut Director	Gauri Shinde	Won
Filmfare Awards	Best Film	English Vinglish	Nominated
Filmfare Awards	Best Director	Gauri Shinde	Nominated
Filmfare Awards	Best Actress	Sridevi	Nominated
Hello Magazine Hall of Fame Awards	Outstanding Performance of the Year	Sridevi	Won
IRDS Film Award for Social Concern	Best Female Character	Sridevi	Won
Laadli National Award	Best Mainline Film	English Vinglish	Won
24th Annual Palm Springs International Film Festival	Mercedes-Benz Audience Award for Best Narrative Feature	English Vinglish	Nominated
Stardust Awards	Best Film	English Vinglish	Nominated
Stardust Awards	Best Director	Gauri Shinde	Nominated
Stardust Awards	Star of the Year – Female	Sridevi	Nominated
Stardust Awards	Best Drama Actress	Sridevi	Won
Stardust Awards	Best Debut Director	Gauri Shinde	Won
Star Guild Awards	Best Film	English Vinglish	Nominated
Star Guild Awards	Best Director	Gauri Shinde	Nominated
Star Guild Awards	Best Actress	Sridevi	Nominated
Star Guild Awards	Best Supporting Actress	Priya Anand	Nominated
Star Guild Awards	Best Debut Director	Gauri Shinde	Won
Star Guild Awards	Best Story	Gauri Shinde	Nominated
Star Guild Awards	Best Screenplay	Gauri Shinde	Nominated
Star Guild Awards	Best Dialogue	Gauri Shinde	Nominated
Women's International Film and Television Showcase	Diversity Award	English Vinglish	Won
Zee Cine Awards	Best Film	English Vinglish	Nominated
Zee Cine Awards	Best Actor – Female	Sridevi	Nominated
Zee Cine Awards	Most Promising Director	Gauri Shinde	Won
14th IIFA Awards	Best Film	English Vinglish	Nominated
14th IIFA Awards	Best Actress	Sridevi	Nominated
14th IIFA Awards	Best Debut Director	Gauri Shinde	Won
14th IIFA Awards	Best Story	Gauri Shinde	Nominated

== Impact ==
With English Vinglish, Sridevi made a successful comeback after a long hiatus. Box Office Capsule hailed the film and Sridevi's return as "Golden Comeback of the Queen." Sridevi was ranked No.1 on many year-end lists, including:

- Rediff's "Top 10 Bollywood Actresses of 2012" for giving a "performance younger actresses, including the ones on this list, should learn from."
- CNN-IBN's list of "Top 10 Bollywood Actresses of 2012" for a performance that "overshadowed young actresses".
- Yahoo's "Top Ten Actresses of 2012" for "winning the hearts of millions of middle-class housewives".
- Box Office Capsule's "Top 10 Bollywood Actresses of 2012" for "conquering hearts as well as the box-office".
- Bollyspice's "Top 10 Bollywood Actresses of 2012" for "making us fall under her spell all over again".
- Buzzine's "Top 5 Bollywood Actors of 2012" list for returning with "grace and elegance".

Sridevi won the "Vuclip Icons of 2012" mobile survey to be voted as the Most Admired Actress of Bollywood. Her performance created an enormous impact when Amitabh Bachchan said in his blog that Sridevi's heart-rending acting in English Vinglish moved him to tears leaving "collective lumps in the throat". A poll by BollywoodLife declared Sridevi as the "Most Powerful Actress in B-Town", winning by a landslide 75% votes over all the current actresses.

The actress was featured as one of the Top Newsmakers of 2012 by NDTV and Filmfare. Filmfare listed Sridevi as the "Top Game Changer of 2012" for making "a hit comeback after getting married and mothering 2 kids". Reuters' list stated that "Sridevi, in her comeback movie, outshone any actress in any role this year and proved once again that you don't need a male star to make a good Bollywood film", while India Today said, "Sridevi was reinvented in a role of substance". MTV wrote, "when an actor of Sridevi's calibre breaks her 15-year hiatus, you can be sure she has a winner in tow".

Since its worldwide success, English Vinglish consistently appeared on media outlets' Best Films of the Year lists. It was ranked first on the Times of India's list of "Top 10 Films of 2012", which compared Gauri Shinde's directorial debut with veterans Manoj Kumar, Gulzar and Aparna Sen. It featured in "Best Bollywood Films of 2012" by Reuters, "Bollywood's Most Appreciated Films of 2012" by IBN Live, 'Top Bollywood Movies of 2012' by India Today, "Best Films of 2012" list by Rediff and Forbes' "Best of Bollywood 2012". The film ranked third on MTV's "Top 5 Movies of 2012". It ranked No. 2 on Raja Sen's "Ten Best Films of 2012" and 4th on Rajeev Masand's list of "Top 5 Hits of 2012". The café scene in the film ranked No. 2 on CNN-IBN's list of "Top 10 Bollywood's Best Scenes of 2012". English Vinglish, particularly Sridevi's character in the film, was noted for inspiring Dalit girls in Bihar to master the English language. Filmfare listed it as one of the fifteen strongest women characters in Bollywood. Radhika Seth and Riya Dhankar of Vogue India listed it as one of the most empowering female characters in Bollywood. Srishti Magan of ScoopWhoop listed it as one of the nineteen most relatable female characters from Bollywood.

Director Gauri Shinde featured in the Financial Times' 2012 list of "25 Indians To Watch". She also featured on Rediff's list of "Bollywood's 5 Best Directors of 2012".

== Oscar shortlist ==
In September 2013, English Vinglish was considered for being shortlisted for the Indian submission for the Academy Award for Best Foreign Language Film.
