= AB Corp =

Indian entertainment company

- Type: Private
- Industry: Entertainment
- Founded: 1995 (as ABCL); 2003 (as AB Corp)
- Headquarters: Mumbai, India
- Key people: Amitabh Bachchan; Jaya Bachchan; Abhishek Bachchan
- Owner: Amitabh Bachchan; Deepak Gulwani

AB Corp, formerly known as Amitabh Bachchan Corporation Limited, is an Indian entertainment company. Founded by actor Amitabh Bachchan and formally launched in January 1995, the first film it produced was Tere Mere Sapne in 1996. After declaring bankruptcy in 1999, ABCL was renamed AB Corp in 2001. In 2009, the company again began producing major films, such as Paa (2009), Bbuddah... Hoga Terra Baap (2011), Sarkar 3 (2017), and Ghoomer (2023).

== History ==
=== Founding of ABCL (1994-1997) ===
Formally launched in January 1995, Amitabh Bachchan Corporation (ABCL) was founded as an Indian entertainment company by actor Amitabh Bachchan in 1994. Previously, in 1992, Bachchan had announced his semi retirement from the film industry, and with the exception of the delayed 1994 release of Insaniyat (1994), did not appear in any films for five years. He turned producer during his temporary retirement period, setting up ABCL, which became involved in event management, film production, and distribution, specializing in film production and event management. Among other early productions, Dekh Bhai Dekh was a Hindi sitcom produced via ABCL from 1993 to 1994 by actress Jaya Bachchan, Amitabh Bachchan's wife and an ABCL board-member.

The first film ABCL produced was Tere Mere Sapne in 1996, which was a box office hit and launched the careers of actors like Arshad Warsi and southern film star Simran. ABCL's strategy was to introduce products and services covering an entire cross-section of India's entertainment industry. ABCL's operations were mainstream commercial film production and distribution, audio cassettes and video discs, production and marketing of television software, and celebrity and event management. Notably, the company organized the Miss World 1996 competition in Bangalore. It was a producer of the 1998 film Major Saab.

=== Controversy and bankruptcy (1997-2000) ===
ABCL was plagued by financial difficulties. The main reason for the bad performance of ABCL was blamed on the gross mismanagement of the company by the, then CEO, Sanjiv Gupta, who went on to become the CEO of Coca-Cola India. The hosting of the Miss World competition in 1996 proved highly controversial within India, and burst ABCL into the limelight in 1997. The competition was then mired with controversy when the company was not able to pay its dues.

AB Corp declared bankruptcy in 1999, resulting in substantial losses for Amitabh Bachchan. With creditors led by Doordarshan and Canara Bank, ABCL approached the Board of Industrial and Financial Reconstruction to seek protection under bankruptcy laws. According to Bachchan, after the bankruptcy, he and the company faced 55 lawsuits, and the company was Rs 90 crore in debt. Instead of closing the company over $14 million in debts, however, the company decided to work on clearing debts instead. Bachchan subsequently raised funds from projects such as Kaun Banega Crorepati (Who Wants to Be A Millionaire), where he was a host in 2000. He states he had no film prospects until the romantic film Mohabbatein (2000) by Yash Chopra.

=== AB Corp (2001-2025) ===
In 2001, ABCL was renamed AB Corp, headed by CEO Ramesh Pulapaka. In 2003, Amitabh Bachchan was chairman, while other board directors included Jaya Bachchan and Amar Singh. In 2004, AB Corp wiped off its accumulated losses, and over the next six years, was profitable each year. AB Corp worked on films such as Viruddh (2005) with Mahesh Manjrekar and Family (2006) with Rajkumar Santoshi. From 2006 to late 2007, AB Corp had a year sabbatical in production. It then worked with UTV to produce a new film by director Shoojit Sarkar. In 2008, P Ramesh was CEO of AB Corp. After AB Corp entered into a contract with Reliance BIG Entertainment for Rs 15 billion in June 2008, by 2009, the deal "fizzled out", and AB Corp had contracted with Studio 18. In 2008, its filings with the Ministry of Corporate Affairs showed annual profits of Rs 19.26 crore, driven in part by brand endorsements and Bachchan's media appearances. In December 2009, the company signed a three-movie contract with Toonz Animation India. At the time, Amitabh Bachchan held over 36% of AB Corp's shares. Along with his wife Jaya Bachchan and their son Abhishek Bachchan, the family held near 50% of shares.

In 2008, AB Corp became a producer of Vihir, its first Marathi film. The film premiered in 2009 and was more widely released in January 2010. Also in 2009, AB Corp was working on the film Paa, directed by R Balakrishnan. The first production by Abhishek Bachchan through AB Corp, Paa won four National Film Awards in 2010, which Amitabh Bachchan said was a "godsend" for the company. AB Corp and Viacom 18 Motion Pictures produced the film Bbuddah Hoga Tera Baap in 2011, with Amitabh Bachchan as lead actor. AB Corp in 2014 was reported to be planning on bidding on kabaddi players in the Kabaddi Premier League. In 2015, the company produced Shamitabh under director R. Balki. Other recent movies supported by AB Corp include Sarkar 3 (2017) and Ghoomer (2023). In 2024, Rajesh Yadav was managing director of AB Corp.

== Filmography ==
=== Producer ===
Year	Film	Language
1995	Gulabi	Telugu
1996	Tere Mere Sapne	Hindi
1996	Yuvathurki	Malayalam
1997	Ullaasam	Tamil
1997	Mrityudata	Hindi
1998	Rajahamsa	Telugu
1998	Saat Rang Ke Sapne	Hindi
1998	Major Saab	Hindi
2001	Aks	Hindi
2005	Viruddh... Family Comes First	Hindi
2005	Antarmahal	Bengali
2006	Family	Hindi
2009	Paa	Hindi
2010	Vihir	Marathi
2011	Bbuddah... Hoga Terra Baap	Hindi
2013	Saptapadii	Gujarati
2015	Shamitabh	Hindi
2017	Sarkar 3	Hindi
2023	Ghoomer	Hindi

=== Distributor ===
Year	Film	Notes
1995	Bombay	Hindi version
1995	Sazaa-E-Kalapani	Hindi version

== Discography ==
Year	Film	Notes
1996	Bandit Queen soundtrack album	
1996	Manik Baashha soundtrack album	Hindi version
1996	Kaalapani soundtrack album	
1996	Diljale soundtrack album	
1996	Shastra soundtrack album	
1996	Sapoot soundtrack album	
1996	Rakshak soundtrack album	
1996	Tere Mere Sapne soundtrack album	
1996	Naam Kya Hai	Unreleased
1996	Prema Desam soundtrack album	
1997	Mrityudata soundtrack album	
1997	Itihaas soundtrack album	
1997	Saat Rang Ke Sapne soundtrack album	
1997	Yugpurush soundtrack album	
1998	Major Saab soundtrack album	Album released May 20, 1998
