= Paa (film) =

2009 Indian film by R. Balki

- Theatrical release poster
- Directed by: R. Balki
- Written by: R. Balki
- Produced by: Amitabh Bachchan; Abhishek Bachchan; Sunil Manchanda
- Starring: Amitabh Bachchan; Abhishek Bachchan; Vidya Balan
- Cinematography: P. C. Sriram
- Edited by: Anil Naidu
- Music by: Ilaiyaraaja
- Production companies: Reliance Big Pictures; Amitabh Bachchan Corporation; MAD Entertainment
- Distributed by: Reliance Big Pictures
- Release date: 4 December 2009
- Running time: 133 minutes
- Country: India
- Language: Hindi

Paa (transl. Father) is a 2009 Indian Hindi-language comedy-drama film directed by R. Balki, starring Amitabh Bachchan, Abhishek Bachchan, and Vidya Balan. Jaya Bachchan makes a cameo appearance in the opening credits of the film as a narrator. The film is inspired by the 1996 Hollywood film Jack as per some reports and is based on the relationship of a boy with a rare genetic condition progeria and his parents. Amitabh and Abhishek, father and son in real life, play son and father respectively in the film. The film was released worldwide on 4 December 2009. Veteran composer Ilaiyaraaja scored the film's music.

The film was critically acclaimed in India and fared well at the box office. Despite a warm reception from Indian film critics, the film received mixed reviews from overseas film critics, according to the websites Metacritic and Rotten Tomatoes. Amitabh Bachchan received his third National Film Award for Best Actor at the 57th National Film Awards for his performance and his fifth Filmfare Award for Best Actor and Vidya Balan got her first Filmfare Award for Best Actress.

== Plot ==
Auro is an intelligent and witty 12-year-old boy with an extremely rare genetic disorder called progeria. Mentally, he is 12 and very normal, but physically, he looks five times older. Despite his condition, Auro is a very happy boy, and he lives with his mother, Vidya, who is a gynaecologist. Meanwhile, Amol Arte is a young, flamboyant politician. He is a man with a mission, out to prove to the world that "politics" is not a bad word. Auro is Amol's son; however, Vidya conceals this from him. Amol meets Auro when he visits Auro's school as the chief guest of a competition on the "visionary of India." Amol decides Auro is the winner, impressed by the white globe he made, but being seen with such a prominent politician, Auro is found by the media.

The next day, the media tries to enter Auro's school. Auro, annoyed by this, sends Amol an email, which says, "I hate you." Amol reads it and obtains a restraining order from the High Court stating that nobody can disturb him without permission. Auro, relieved, tells him of his desire to visit the president's house, but due to Amol's political issues, he fails to show up on the appointed day. Auro, however, loses confidence in him but later agrees to go to Delhi with him, although he now knows that Amol is his father. Though Amol does not know that Auro is his son, he takes him to Delhi to see the president's house. Auro says that he still needs to forgive Amol for his first mistake (not accepting him), but he does not tell him what it is. On his 13th birthday, he is in the hospital, and he tells his father that he, Auro, is his father's mistake. Auro tries to get his mother and father back together, but Vidya resists, still hurt by the fact that Amol wanted her to have an abortion when they first found out she was pregnant.

Amol realizes his mistake and proposes to Vidya, as he is still in love with her. He stays by Auro's side when he finds out that Auro is his son. Auro's health begins to deteriorate as his aging catches up. However, he is finally able to reunite his mother and father as Vidya gives in to her feelings for Amol and her motherly love for Auro. They perform the first wedding rites in the hospital in front of their dying son, implying that they will do the rest later. Auro says his last words, "Maa," to Vidya and "Paa," to Amol, before dying with a satisfied smile. The movie ends in the rain with Vidya mourning Auro's death as Amol comforts her.

== Cast ==
- Amitabh Bachchan as Auro
- Abhishek Bachchan as Amol Arte, Auro's father
- Vidya Balan as Dr. Vidya Bharadwaj, Auro's mother
- Paresh Rawal as Kaushal Arte, Auro's paternal grandfather and Amol's father
- Arundhati Nag as Bhumi "Bum" Bharadwaj, Auro's maternal grandmother and Vidya's mother
- Satyajit Sharma as Jaikirt
- Sachin Parikh as Vidya's patient
- Prateek Katare as Vishnu
- Taruni Sachdev as Soumini "Somi", Auro's classmate
- Olivier Lafont as Sagar
- Aalekh Kapoor as Raj
- Jaya Bachchan in a cameo appearance as a narrator in the opening credits

== Production ==
=== Casting ===
The film had Amitabh Bachchan playing the role of a child who is suffering from progeria, a genetic disorder which leads to the quick acceleration of the ageing process in children. Abhishek Bachchan, Amitabh's real-life son, played the role of his father.

Vidya Balan was the only choice for the mother's role. Arundathi Nag, the wife of late Kannada actor-director Shankar Nag was asked to play the role of Vidya's mother.

=== Filming ===
Most of the parts were shot in Lucknow and some parts of the film were shot in the UK and Malaysia. A small portion of the filming was done at Cambridge and Oxford. The clock of Corpus Christi College and the courtyard of St. John's College in Cambridge and Brasenose Lane and Radcliffe Square in Oxford have been shown in a song sequence. The film was also shot in Taiping, Malaysia. The King Edward VII school was actually one of the typical Malaysian schools.

One of the notable things in the movie was Amitabh's prosthetic make-up. It was done by Hollywood's Christien Tinsley (famous for his work in The Passion of the Christ, Catwoman and other films) and Dominie Till of The Lord of the Rings film trilogy fame.

Balki had earlier planned to make a sequel named Maa. He said, "My main aim was not to make a film on progeria. My main motive behind making Paa was to reverse the roles of Amitabh and Abhishek. I decided to do something like this because once I was with both of them and I saw Abhishek behaving in a very matured manner and Amitabh, behaving as a kid. It was then that this idea struck me."

Paa was Abhishek Bachchan's first venture into producing films for his family company AB Corp. Ltd. Abhishek not only was one of the lead actors in Paa, but was the main hands-on producer in charge of the film's budget, marketing, and the entire production of the film. It took hours for Amitabh Bachchan to put on his makeup and to take it off.

== Soundtrack ==
Paa

Soundtrack album by Ilaiyaraaja
- Genre: Feature film soundtrack
- Label: T-Series
- Producer: Sunil Manchanda

The soundtrack was composed by veteran composer Ilaiyaraaja, who reused many of his own Tamil songs. The lyrics were penned by Swanand Kirkire. "Halke Se Bole" is based on the song "Putham Pudhu Kaalai" from his 1980 film Alaigal Oivathillai. "Gumm Summ Gumm" is based on the song "Sangathil Padatha" which Ilaiyaraaja had composed for the 1982 film Auto Raja. The song "Mere Paa" is based on his song "Kaatru Vizhi", from Balu Mahendra's film Adhu Oru Kana Kaalam.

Track listing
No.	Title	Singer(s)	Length
1.	"Mudhi Mudhi Ittefaq Se"	Shilpa Rao	2:53
2.	"Gumm Summ Gumm"	Bhavatharini, Shravan	4:40
3.	"Udhi Udhi Ittefaq Se"	Shilpa Rao	2:36
4.	"Hichki Hichki"	Sunidhi Chauhan	4:22
5.	"Gali Mudhi Ittefaq Se"	Shaan	2:40
6.	"Halke Se Bole"	Chorus	1:22
7.	"Mere Paa"	Amitabh Bachchan	4:16
8.	"Paa Theme (Remix)"	Instrumental	3:21

== Reception ==
On the review aggregator website Rotten Tomatoes, 50% of 8 critics' reviews are positive, with an average rating of 5.8/10.

A critic from The Times of India wrote that "Paa is primarily a platform for Auro to steal your heart away. He does. And no, he isn't a desi Benjamin Button". A critic from The Hollywood Reporter wrote that "This would-be tearjerker without the musical numbers of typical Bollywood fare is for die-hard Amitabh Bachchan fans only". A critic from Bollywood Hungama wrote that "A film that should strike a chord with every paa, maa... just about everyone with a heart!"

== Awards and nominations ==
Ceremony	Category	Nominee	Outcome
57th National Film Awards	National Film Award for Best Actor	Amitabh Bachchan	Won
57th National Film Awards	National Film Award for Best Supporting Actress	Arundathi Nag	Won
57th National Film Awards	National Film Award for Best Feature Film in Hindi	AB Corporation Ltd, Sunil Manchanda, R. Balki	Won
57th National Film Awards	National Film Award for Best Make-up Artist	Christien Tinsley, Dominie Till	Won
16th Star Screen Awards	Best Actor	Amitabh Bachchan	Won
16th Star Screen Awards	Best Actress	Vidya Balan	Won
16th Star Screen Awards	Best Child Artist	Pratik Katare	Won
16th Star Screen Awards	Best Supporting Actress	Arundathi Nag	Won
16th Star Screen Awards	Jodi No. 1	Amitabh Bacchan, Abhishek Bachchan	Won
16th Star Screen Awards	Best Film	AB Corporation Ltd, Sunil Manchanda	Nominated
16th Star Screen Awards	Best Director	R. Balki	Nominated
16th Star Screen Awards	Best Story	R. Balki	Nominated
16th Star Screen Awards	Best Screenplay	R. Balki	Nominated
16th Star Screen Awards	Best Dialogue	R. Balki	Nominated
16th Star Screen Awards	Best Background Score	Ilaiyaraja	Won
16th Star Screen Awards	Best Playback Singer (Female)	Shilpa Rao for "Mudi Mudi"	Nominated
16th Star Screen Awards	Best Editing	Anil Naidu	Nominated
16th Star Screen Awards	Best Cinematography	P. C. Sreeram	Nominated
16th Star Screen Awards	Best Audiography	Tapas	Nominated
8th Stardust Awards	Star of the Year – Male	Amitabh Bachchan	Won
8th Stardust Awards	Best Supporting Actor	Abhishek Bachchan	Won
8th Stardust Awards	Star of the Year – Female	Vidya Balan	Nominated
55th Filmfare Awards	Best Actor	Amitabh Bachchan	Won
55th Filmfare Awards	Best Actress	Vidya Balan	Won
55th Filmfare Awards	Best Supporting Actress	Arundathi Nag	Nominated
55th Filmfare Awards	Best Movie	AB Corp Ltd.	Nominated
55th Filmfare Awards	Best Director	R. Balki	Nominated
11th IIFA Awards	Best Actor	Amitabh Bachchan	Won
11th IIFA Awards	Best Actress	Vidya Balan	Won
11th IIFA Awards	Best Makeup	Christien Tinsley, Domini Till	Won
11th IIFA Awards	Best Movie	AB Corporation Ltd, Sunil Manchanda	Nominated
11th IIFA Awards	Best Director	R. Balki	Nominated
11th IIFA Awards	Best Supporting Actor	Abhishek Bachchan	Nominated
11th IIFA Awards	Best Supporting Actress	Arundathi Nag	Nominated
11th IIFA Awards	Best Story	R. Balki	Nominated
11th IIFA Awards	Best Female Playback	Shilpa Rao for "Mudhi Mudhi"	Nominated
7th Apsara Film & Television Producers Guild Awards	Best Actor	Amitabh Bachchan	Won
7th Apsara Film & Television Producers Guild Awards	Best Actress	Vidya Balan	Won
Lines Gold Award	Best Actor	Amitabh Bachchan	Won
Lines Gold Award	Best Actress	Vidya Balan	Won
FICCI Frames Excellence Awards	Best Actor	Amitabh Bachchan	Won
FICCI Frames Excellence Awards	Best Actress	Vidya Balan	Won
Matri Shree Media Award	Best Film	R. Balki	Won
