= Gauri Shinde =

Indian film director

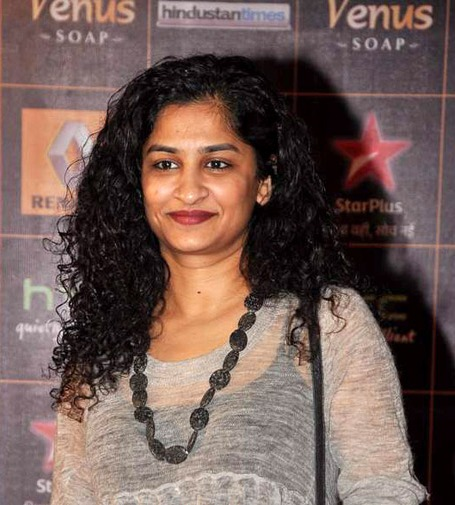
- Shinde at the HT Style Awards in 2015
- Born: 6 July 1974 (age 51); Pune, Maharashtra, India
- Occupations: Film director; screenwriter
- Known for: English Vinglish (2012); Dear Zindagi (2016)
- Spouse: R. Balki (m. 2007)

Gauri Shinde (born 6 July 1974) is an Indian film director and screenwriter. Shinde made her directorial debut with the highly acclaimed English Vinglish (2012), which marked the comeback of actress Sridevi. Shinde featured in the Financial Times 2012 list of '25 Indians To Watch'. She also featured on Rediff's list of 'Bollywood's 5 Best Directors of 2012'.

== Early life and education ==
Gauri Shinde was born and brought up in Pune, where she studied at St Joseph's High School and later graduated from Symbiosis Institute of Mass Communication in Pune. Her aspiration towards film-making started right from the days at the end of her college life.

== Career ==
She moved to Mumbai for her internship with documentary director Siddharth Kak and later started working with advertising agencies like IBW, Bates Clarion and Lowe Lintas, where R. Balki was the creative director. In following years she made over 100 advertising films and short films; her short film Oh Man! (2001) was selected for the Berlin Film Festival.

She made her feature film debut as a director with English Vinglish (2012), a film inspired by Shinde's own relationship with her mother, who ran her own pickle business out of her home in Pune, and was a Marathi-speaking woman, who didn't speak English well, which embarrassed Shinde as a child. As she said in an interview, "I made this film to say sorry to my mother." The film was released on 14 September 2012 at the Toronto International Film Festival followed by its commercial release in India and worldwide on 5 October 2012, and went on to receive both critical and commercial success. Besides the Filmfare Award for Best Debut Director, she was awarded the 'Laadli National Media Awards for Gender Sensitivity'.

== Personal life ==
Shinde married film director R. Balki in 2007.

== Filmography ==
Year	Title	Director	Writer	Producer
2012	English Vinglish	Yes	Yes	No
2016	Dear Zindagi	Yes	Yes	Yes
2022	Chup: Revenge of The Artist	No	No	Yes

== Awards ==
Award	Category	Film	Result
58th Filmfare Awards	Best Director	English Vinglish	Nominated
58th Filmfare Awards	Best Debut Director	English Vinglish	Won
Screen Awards	Most Promising Debut Director	English Vinglish	Won
Screen Awards	Best Story	English Vinglish	Nominated
Screen Awards	Best Screenplay	English Vinglish	Nominated
14th IIFA Awards	Best Story	English Vinglish	Nominated
14th IIFA Awards	Best Debut Director	English Vinglish	Won
Zee Cine Awards 2013	Most Promising Director	English Vinglish	Won
19th Annual Colors Screen Awards	Most Promising Debut Director	English Vinglish	Won
Stardust Awards	Best Debut Director	English Vinglish	Won
Stardust Awards	Best Director	English Vinglish	Nominated
Laadli National Media Awards	Best Mainline Film	English Vinglish	Won
Star Guild Awards	Best Debut Director	English Vinglish	Won
Star Guild Awards	Best Director	English Vinglish	Nominated
Star Guild Awards	Best Story	English Vinglish	Nominated
Star Guild Awards	Best Screenplay	English Vinglish	Nominated
Star Guild Awards	Best Dialogue	English Vinglish	Nominated
Women's International Film and Television Showcase	Diversity Award	English Vinglish	Won
Toifa Awards 2013	Best Debut Director	English Vinglish	Won
Screen Awards	Best Director	Dear Zindagi	Nominated
Screen Awards	Best Film	Dear Zindagi	Nominated
Stardust Awards	Best Story	Dear Zindagi	Nominated
