= R. Balki =

Indian filmmaker (born 1964)

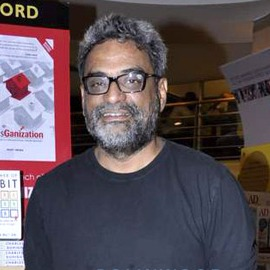
- Born: 16 April 1964 (age 62); Kumbakonam, Tamil Nadu, India
- Other name: R. Balakrishnan
- Occupations: Former Group Chairman Lowe Lintas, film director, screenwriter
- Spouse: Gauri Shinde (m. 2007)

R. Balakrishnan, popularly known as R. Balki, (born 16 April 1964) is an Indian filmmaker, screenwriter and former Group Chairman of the advertising agency Lowe Lintas (India). He is best known for directing the films Cheeni Kum (2007), Paa (2009), Pad Man (2018), Chup: Revenge of The Artist (2022), and Ghoomer (2023).

== Career ==
Balki wrote and directed the 2007 comedy-drama film Cheeni Kum, starring Amitabh Bachchan and Tabu, which marked his directorial debut. His second directorial was the critically acclaimed and commercially successful Paa, produced by Sunil Manchanda and Abhishek Bachchan which was released on 4 December 2009, starring Amitabh Bachchan, his son Abhishek Bachchan and Vidya Balan. The film received multiple nominations in addition to winning the National Film Award for Best Feature Film in Hindi the following year. In 2015, he directed the satirical drama Shamitabh which would mark his third collaboration with Amitabh Bachchan. The film also starred Tamil actor Dhanush and marked the acting debut Akshara Haasan, daughter of actor-director Kamal Haasan. In 2016, he directed the comedy-drama Ki and Ka which starred Kareena Kapoor and Arjun Kapoor. In 2018, he directed the social comedy Pad Man starring Akshay Kumar and Radhika Apte. The film was based on the life of Arunachalam Muruganantham, which he co-produced, scripted and directed. In 2019, he co-produced and scripted the 2019 film Mission Mangal, in addition to serving as a creative director. His next directorial was the thriller Chup : Revenge Of The Artist, starring Dulquer Salmaan, Sunny Deol and Shreya Dhanwanthary in lead roles. The film revolved around a serial killer who targets film critics. In 2023, he wrote and directed and the sports drama Ghoomer starring Abhishek Bachchan and Saiyami Kher. It premiered at the Indian Film Festival of Melbourne.

== Personal life ==
Balki was born on 16 April 1964 in Kumbakonam, Tamil Nadu and brought up in Bengaluru. Prior to his filmmaking career, he worked in advertising and served as the chairman of advertising agency Lowe Lintas. In 2016, he retired from advertising to focus on his filmmaking career.

Balki married filmmaker Gauri Shinde in 2007.

== Filmography ==
Year	Title	Credited as			Notes
Year	Title	Director	Producer	Writer	Notes
2007	Cheeni Kum	Yes	No	Yes	
2009	Paa	Yes	No	Yes	
2012	English Vinglish	No	Yes	No	
2015	Shamitabh	Yes	Yes	Yes	
2016	Ki & Ka	Yes	Yes	Yes	
2018	Pad Man	Yes	Yes	Yes	
2019	Mission Mangal	No	No	Yes	
2022	Chup: Revenge of The Artist	Yes	Yes	Yes	
2023	Lust Stories 2	Yes	No	Yes	Segment: Made for Each Other
2023	Ghoomer	Yes	Yes	Yes	

== Awards and nominations ==
Paa received 14 nominations at the 16th Star Screen Awards of which the film won five awards. It also won National Film Award for Best Feature Film in Hindi.

For Pad Man, he won the award for Best Director at the Indian Film Festival of Melbourne in 2018. Padman also won the National Film Award for the Best Film on Social Issues.

Year	Award	Category	Film(s)	Result	Ref.
2008	9th IIFA Awards	Best Story	Cheeni Kum	Nominated	
2008	Producers Guild Film Awards	Best Story	Cheeni Kum	Nominated	
2008	Producers Guild Film Awards	Best Dialogues	Cheeni Kum	Nominated	
2008	14th Screen Awards	Most Promising Debut Director	Cheeni Kum	Nominated	
2008	Stardust Awards	Hottest Young Film Maker	Cheeni Kum	Nominated	
2008	11th Zee Cine Awards	Most Promising Debut Director	Cheeni Kum	Nominated	
2010	55th Filmfare Awards	Best Director	Paa	Nominated	
2010	55th Filmfare Awards	Best Screenplay	Paa	Nominated	
2010	11th IIFA Awards	Best Director	Paa	Nominated	
2010	11th IIFA Awards	Best Story	Paa	Nominated	
2010	57th National Film Awards	Best Feature Film in Hindi	Paa	Won	
2010	16th Screen Awards	Best Director	Paa	Nominated	
2010	16th Screen Awards	Best Story	Paa	Nominated	
2010	16th Screen Awards	Best Screenplay	Paa	Nominated	
2010	16th Screen Awards	Best Dialogue	Paa	Nominated	
2018	Indian Film Festival of Melbourne	Best Director	Pad Man	Nominated	
2019	66th National Film Awards	Best Film on Other Social Issues	Pad Man	Won	
