= Saffron Magicworks =

Indian film production company

- Formerly: Saffron Broadcast & Media
- Industry: Entertainment
- Founded: 2017
- Founder: Nikhil Dwivedi
- Headquarters: Mumbai, Maharashtra, India
- Products: Films and series
- Services: Film and television production
- Website: https://saffronmagicworks.com

Saffron Magicworks is a film and television production company founded by Nikhil Dwivedi. As of 2024, the company has produced four films, including two that are yet-to be released, and one television series.

The company's first production was the comedy film Veere Di Wedding (2018), which ranks among the highest-grossing female-led Hindi films. They have since produced the action sequel film Dabangg 3 (2019), the mythological television series Shrimad Bhagwat Mahapuran (2019–2020), and the Netflix thriller film CTRL (2024).

== History ==
Saffron's first production was the comedy film Veere Di Wedding (2018), which Dwivedi co-produced with Ekta Kapoor’s Balaji Motion Pictures and Rhea Kapoor’s Anil Kapoor Films. The film starred a female ensemble cast of Kareena Kapoor Khan, Sonam Kapoor Ahuja, Swara Bhaskar, and Shikha Talsania, and tells the story of the romantic trials and tribulations of four friends. Released in 2018, it set several opening records for a female-led Hindi film, and eventually earned ₹138 crore worldwide to rank among the biggest female-led earners of Hindi cinema. It also earned both controversy and praise for its realistic portrayal of female sexuality, a rarity in mainstream Indian cinema.

The following year, the company collaborated with Salman Khan Films and Arbaaz Khan Production to produce Dabangg 3 (2019), which marked the third instalment of the Dabangg cop franchise. Led by Salman Khan and Sonakshi Sinha and directed by Prabhudeva, the film continues the story of Chulbul Pandey as he has to confront an enemy from the past. It earned ₹230 crore worldwide. Also that year, Saffron ventured into television by producing the mythological television limited series Shrimad Bhagwat Mahapuran. Starring Shiny Doshi and Rajneesh Duggal, the show is based on tales written in the Hindu scriptures of Srimad Bhagavatam. It aired weekly on Colors TV in 2019 and 2020.

In March 2021, Dwivedi sued Kamaal R. Khan for a series of tweets made against him and the company. The Bombay High Court granted an injunction to Dwivedi, preventing Khan from posting anything against him or his company.

The company next released CTRL on Netflix in 2024. It is a screenlife thriller directed by Vikramaditya Motwane and starring Ananya Panday and Vihaan Samat.

Saffron has several projects in development. They will also produce an as-yet untitled thriller directed by Anurag Kashyap and starring Bobby Deol, Sanya Malhotra, Saba Azad and Joju George. In addition, a Naagin film trilogy starring Shraddha Kapoor is in development.

== Filmography ==
=== Film ===
Key
†	Denotes films that have not yet been released

Title	Year	Director	Co-producer	Cast
Veere Di Wedding	2018	Shashanka Ghosh	Balaji Motion Pictures, Anil Kapoor Films	Kareena Kapoor Khan, Sonam Kapoor Ahuja, Swara Bhaskar, Shikha Talsania
Dabangg 3	2019	Prabhu Deva	Salman Khan Films, Arbaaz Khan Production	Salman Khan, Sonakshi Sinha, Sudeep, Saiee Manjrekar
CTRL	2024	Vikramaditya Motwane	Andolan Films	Ananya Panday, Vihaan Samat
Bandar	2026	Anurag Kashyap		Bobby Deol, Sanya Malhotra, Saba Azad, Joju George

=== Television ===
Title	Year	Network	Cast
Shrimad Bhagwat Mahapuran	2019-2020	Colors TV	Shiny Doshi, Rajneesh Duggal
