= Nikhil Dwivedi =

Indian actor and producer

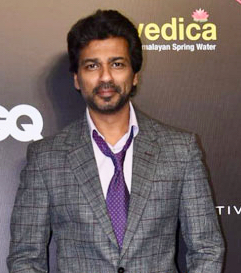
- Dwivedi in 2022
- Born: 25 November 1978 (age 47); Uttar Pradesh, India
- Occupations: Actor; producer
- Years active: 2008–present
- Organisation: Saffron Magicworks
- Spouse: Gaurie Pandit (m. 2011)
- Children: 1

Nikhil Dwivedi (born 25 November 1978) is an Indian actor and producer. He made his acting debut with a leading role in the 2008 crime comedy film My Name Is Anthony Gonsalves, which performed poorly at the box office. He subsequently appeared in Raavan (2010), Shor in the City (2011), Hate Story (2012) and Tamanchey (2014) most of which were met with limited commercial success.

Dwivedi produced the comedy Veere Di Wedding (2018), followed by the television series Shrimad Bhagwat Mahapuran (2019–2020) and the action film Dabangg 3 (2019). In 2024, he produced the Netflix thriller CTRL. He also returned to acting, appearing as the antagonist in the series Scam 1992 (2020).

== Early life ==
Nikhil Dwivedi was born on 25 November 1978 in Kanpur, Uttar Pradesh. His father hailed from Allahabad but Nikhil in his childhood, moved to many cities in India due to his father’s transferable job as a banker. He did his schooling from Sherwood College, Naini Tal before doing his graduation in commerce from Mithibai College, Mumbai. He did his MBA in finance from the Symbiosis Center for Management & HRD, Pune and went on to work with the American Express Bank and another large consumer durables conglomerate before pursuing an acting career. He said that he aspired to be an actor since he was three and a half years old.

== Career ==
Dwivedi made his acting debut in the crime comedy film My Name Is Anthony Gonsalves (2008), directed by E. Niwas. The film was a commercial failure at the box office. Reviewing the film, Patsy N of Rediff.com noted that he "shows potential" in his performance. For the role, he received nominations for the Filmfare Best Male Debut Award and the Stardust Award for Superstar of Tomorrow – Male.

In 2010, Dwivedi appeared as part of the ensemble cast in Mani Ratnam’s action-adventure film Raavan. He played a character based on Lakshmana from the Ramayana. While the film was a commercial failure, Kaveree Bamzai of India Today noted that he was "excellent" in his part. Dwivedi later acknowledged the film's poor box office performance but stated he viewed the role as a positive step for his career recognition.

In 2011, Dwivedi appeared as a petty criminal in the ensemble crime film Shor in the City. While the film received critical acclaim, it had a limited impact at the box office. Gaurav Malani of The Times of India wrote that Dwivedi was "especially impressive in the concluding reels." His performance earned him a nomination for the Stardust Award for Breakthrough Performance – Male.

In 2012, Dwivedi starred in the erotic thriller Hate Story, directed by Vivek Agnihotri. The film was a commercial success. During production, Dwivedi sustained fractures to his arms and wrist while performing a stunt, which delayed his subsequent project, Tamanchey.

Released in 2014, the crime film Tamanchey, co-starring Richa Chadha, was both a critical and commercial failure. While some trade reports noted his performance, the film was largely panned, with Nandini Ramnath of Scroll.in stating that it "fires blanks from start to finish."

Citing a lack of acting opportunities, Dwivedi transitioned into film production by launching his production house, Saffron. His first production was the comedy Veere Di Wedding (2018), co-produced with Rhea Kapoor and Ekta Kapoor. The film was a commercial success, grossing approximately ₹138 crore worldwide.

In 2019, he produced the Salman Khan-starrer Dabangg 3, the third installment in the Dabangg franchise. The same year, he produced the mythological television series Shrimad Bhagwat Mahapuran for Colors TV.

Dwivedi returned to acting after six years by playing the role of a scheming banker in Scam 1992. Directed by Hansal Mehta, the series released on Sony LIV and is about the life of stockbroker Harshad Mehta (played by Pratik Gandhi). He said that his background in finance helped him portray the part. The series became one of the most acclaimed and popular streaming productions of India and is amongst the highest rated show on IMDB. Film Companion’s Rahul Desai found Dwivedi “unrecognizable” in his part. He then appeared in the Netflix anthology film Ankahi Kahaniya (2021), in a segment about infidelity directed by Saket Chaudhary. Anna M. M. Vetticad of Firstpost bemoaned that his character of an unfaithful man needed better writing.

Under his production company, Saffron Magicworks, Dwivedi next produced Vikramaditya Motwane’s screenlife thriller for Netflix, named CTRL, starring Ananya Panday, which garnered critical acclaim and was the number 1 film on Netflix for two weeks.

Nikhil Dwivedi has produced a high intensity Prison Drama inspired from a True Incident titled “Bandar" directed by Anurag Kashyap and starring Bobby Deol and Sanya Malhotra.

== Personal life ==
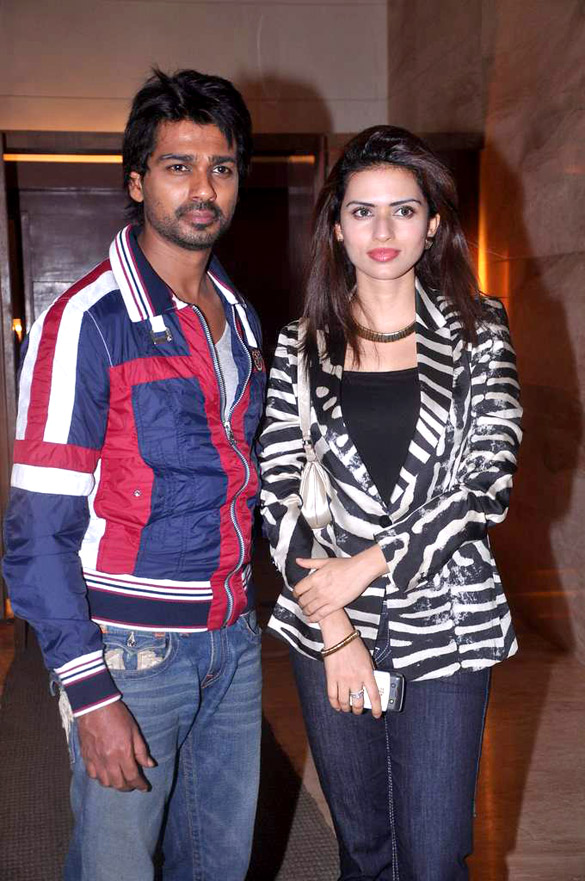
Dwivedi with his wife Gaurie

Dwivedi married model Gaurie Pandit in early 2011. The couple has a son, Shivaan.

== Filmography ==
=== Film ===
Year	Title	Actor	Producer	Notes
2008	My Name Is Anthony Gonsalves	Yes	No	
2010	Raavan	Yes	No	
2011	Shor in the City	Yes	No	
2012	Hate Story	Yes	No	
2014	Tamanchey	Yes	No	
2018	Veere Di Wedding	No	Yes	
2019	Dabangg 3	No	Yes	
2021	Ankahi Kahaniya	Yes	No	Saket Chaudhary's segment
2024	CTRL	No	Yes	
2025	Bandar	No	Yes	Premiere at the TIFF
2027	Naagin †	No	Yes	
2027	Laajawaab †	No	Yes	
2027	Bhangra Da Queen †	No	Yes	

=== Television ===
Year	Title	Actor	Creator	Producer	Notes
2019-2020	Shrimad Bhagwat Mahapuran	No	Yes	Yes	
2020	Scam 1992	Yes	No	No	Sony Liv miniseries

== Awards ==
Year	Award	Category	Nominated work	Result	Ref(s)
2009	Filmfare Awards	Best Male Debut	My Name Is Anthony Gonsalves	Nominated	
2009	Stardust Awards	Superstar of Tomorrow - Male	My Name Is Anthony Gonsalves	Nominated	
2012	Stardust Awards	Breakthrough Performance - Male	Shor in the City	Nominated	
2020	ETC Bollywood Business Awards	The 100 Crore Club	Dabangg 3	Won	
