= Lisa Mishra =

American singer and songwriter

- Born: August 4, 1993 (age 33); Brahmapur, Orissa, India
- Citizenship: United States
- Occupations: Singer; Songwriter; Actress
- Musical career
- Origin: Chicago
- Genres: Pop; playback; Western
- Instrument: Vocals
- Years active: 2017–present
- Labels: Universal Music; Sony Music; Zee Music; Warner Music

Lisa Mishra is an American singer, songwriter and actress. She is best known for her performance of the reprise version of the song "Tareefan", which was included in the soundtrack of the 2018 Indian film Veere Di Wedding. Since then, she has worked on songs like "The Wakhra Song" from the 2019 film Judgementall Hai Kya, "Nadaaniyaan" in the film The Sky Is Pink and also the party-anthem "Chandigarh Mein" from Good Newwz.

She debuted as an actress in the series Call Me Bae (2024), produced by Karan Johar's Dharma Productions.

== Early life and influences ==
Mishra was born in Brahmapur, Odisha to Odia parents, who migrated to the United States when she was six years old, where she was raised in Chicago. She graduated from Illinois Wesleyan University in Bloomington, Illinois in 2015, with a double major in economics and religion. She worked as a data analyst, before pursuing a career as a full-time musician.

Mishra cites SZA and Kehlani as inspirations, and her music draws inspirations from the works of Kanye West and Travis Scott.

== Career ==
She started her own YouTube channel in 2007 when she was 13, where she used to upload cover versions of her favorite songs. She featured on Chance the Rapper's "All We Got" from his 2016 mixtape Coloring Book and the song "Found a Good One (Single No More)", from his debut album The Big Day.

In 2017, Mishra collaborated with Jamila Woods to create the theme song of the Emmy-nominated web series Brown Girls.

On 19 May 2018, she uploaded a video on her Instagram handle singing a mashup of the Hindi song "Tareefan" and DJ Snake's "Let Me Love You". The mashup caught Sonam Kapoor Ahuja’s attention, and Mishra was subsequently flown to India where she recorded and shot for the reprise version of the song for Veere Di Wedding, along with the other stars.

In 2019, Mishra signed with VYRL Originals, part of Universal Music India to release her non-film music. In May 2019, she collaborated with composer-singer Vishal Mishra on "Sajna Ve". She also contributed to film soundtracks throughout 2019, starting with "The Wakhra Song" from the soundtrack of the film Judgementall Hai Kya, alongside Navv Inder and Raja Kumari, which was a remix of the 2015 track "Wakhra Swag". She further appeared on the soundtracks of the films The Sky Is Pink and Good Newwz, on the tracks, "Nadaaniyaan" and "Chandigarh Mein".

Mishra has also sung "Running Back To You", an uptempo dance/house record by Goa based producer and DJ Anish Sood, which released in February 2020. In the same year, she featured on the song "Rider", from rapper Divine's sophomore album Punya Paap.

In 2023, she was featured alongside rapper Fetty Wap on the song "Balenciaga" by New York-based songwriter Akash.

Her debut album, Sorry, I'm Late, released in May 2024, blended Indian and Western pop. It featured guest appearances from rappers Yashraj and RANJ, and the production of the album was primarily handled by Abhijay Sharma and Charan. She was featured in Rolling Stone India's first edition of the "Future of Music" list in 2024. In the same year, Mishra debuted as an actor in the web-series Call Me Bae, while also appearing on its soundtrack, on the track "Yaar Tere Bin".

In 2025, she starred in the series The Royals. She released the single "Teri Hoon", in the same year, during Pride Month, to support the LGBTQ community.

She is now set to reprise her roles in the second seasons of Call Me Bae and The Royals. In an interview with Rolling Stone India, she revealed that she is working on an English-language project.

== Discography ==
=== Soundtracks ===
Denotes films that have not yet been released

Year	Film	Song	Composer(s)	Lyricist(s)	Co-artist(s)
2018	Veere Di Wedding	"Tareefan- Reprise"	QARAN	QARAN, Rupin Pahwa & Badshah	
2019	Judgementall Hai Kya	"The Wakhra Song"	Tanishk Bagchi	Tanishk Bagchi & Raja Kumari	Navv Inder & Raja Kumari
2019	The Sky Is Pink	"Nadaaniyaan"	Pritam	Gulzar	Arjun Kanungo
2019	Good Newwz	"Chandigarh Mein"	Tanishk Bagchi	Tanishk Bagchi & Badshah	Badshah, Harrdy Sandhu & Asees Kaur
2022	Jugjugg Jeeyo	"Nain Ta Heere (Lisa Version)"	Vishal Shelke	Kumaar, Ghulam Mohd Khabar	Guru Randhawa
2022	Liger	"Coka 2.0"	Lijo George-DJ Chetas, Jaani	Jaani, Lijo George	Sukhe
2023	Dono	"Aag Lagdi"	Shankar-Ehsaan-Loy	Irshad Kamil	Siddharth Mahadevan
2024	Call Me Bae	"Yaar Tere Bin"	RUUH, JOH	JOH, RUUH, Smriti Bhoker, Lisa Mishra	JOH, RUUH

=== Studio albums ===
Year	Album	Track	Composer(s)	Lyricist(s)	Performing artist(s)
2024	Sorry, I'm Late	Aadat	Lisa Mishra, Bhumika Anantharaman	Lisa Mishra, Bhumika Anantharaman, Murtuza Gadiwala	Lisa Mishra, Bhumika Anantharaman
2024	Sorry, I'm Late	Saza	Lisa Mishra, Charan, Soham Mukherji, Karan Kanchan	Lisa Mishra, Charan, Shivam Srivastava	Lisa Mishra
2024	Sorry, I'm Late	Nasha	Lisa Mishra, Abhijay Sharma, Riz Shain, Bhumika Anantharaman	Lisa Mishra, Shivam Srivastava, Kunaal Verma	Lisa Mishra
2024	Sorry, I'm Late	Lonely	Lisa Mishra, Charan, Abhijay Sharma	Lisa Mishra, Charan	Lisa Mishra
2024	Sorry, I'm Late	Dil Yeh Mera	Lisa Mishra, Abhijay Sharma, Ranj	Lisa Mishra, Kunaal Verma	Lisa Mishra
2024	Sorry, I'm Late	Roshni	Lisa Mishra, Charan, Abhijay Sharma, Yashraj	Kunaal Verma, Charan, Yashraj	Lisa Mishra, Yashraj, Charan
2024	Sorry, I'm Late	Love Song	Lisa Mishra, Charan	Lisa Mishra, Charan	Lisa Mishra, Charan

=== Singles ===
Denotes songs that have not yet been released

Year	Song	Composer(s)	Lyricist(s)	Co-artist(s)
2018	Right Up There	Sez on the Beat	Lisa Mishra & Badshah	Badshah
2019	Sajna Ve	Vishal Mishra	Akshay Tripathi & Vishal Mishra	Vishal Mishra
2019	Koi Nahi	Rupin Pahwa	Rupin Pahwa	Rupin Pahwa
2020	Running Back to You	Anish Sood	Elizabeth Marie Land and Anish Sood	NA
2020	Nai Chaida	Lisa Mishra	Kunaal Vermaa	NA
2020	The Power of Dreams	Badshah, Lisa Mishra	Badshah & Lisa Mishra	Badshah
2020	Rider	Lisa Mishra, Stunnah Beatz, Kanch	DIVINE, Lisa Mishra & Shah Rule	DIVINE
2021	Together	Dr. Benstein	Avina Shah	Avina Shah, Arjun
2021	Setting Sail	Akashdeep Sengupta, AM.AN	Gary Clark, John Carney, Shloke Lal	Lisa Mishra, Zaeden
2022	Heer Ranjha	Rajat Nagpal, Rito Riba	Rajat Nagpal, Rana Sotal	Rito Riba, Rajat Nagpal
2022	Door Akhiyon Se	Lisa Mishra, Rochak Kohli	Gautam Govind Sharma, Gurpreet Saini, Rochak Kohli	Rochak Kohli
2022	Gadbadi (Na, Na, Na, Na, Na)	Akull, Ten Towns, Yarden Jordi Peleg	Armando Christian Perez, Christopher Kenneri, Ni Kamoze, Kenton Nix, Leeraz Rousseau, Salaam Remi, Troy Darnell Scott, Álvaro Rodriguez	Akull, Static & Ben El, Mellow D
2023	Mere Sang	Prateek Kuhad	Prateek Kuhad	Prateek Kuhad
2023	Aa Mil	Zaeden, Shubham J, Charanpreet Singh	Shubham J, Charanpreet Singh, Tejas Yuvraj, Murtuza Gadiwala	Zaeden
2023	Balenciaga	Lisa Mishra, Akash Ahuja, Fetty Wap, MadStarBase, Davincii	Akash, Fetty Wap, Lisa Mishra, MadStarBase	Akash Ahuja, Fetty Wap
2023	Khoya Sab	KSHMR	KSHMR, Yash Chandra	KSHMR, yungsta
2024	Aadat	NEVERSOBER	Murtuza Gadiwala, Bhumika Anantharaman	bebhumika
2024	Saza	Karan Kanchan, Lisa Mishra, Soham Mukherji	Karan Kanchan, Lisa Mishra, Soham Mukherji, Charan, Lisa Mishra	-
2024	What's Up	Riz Shain	KR$NA & Lisa Mishra	KR$NA
2025	Teri Hoon	The Dirty-Jays	Lisa Mishra, NEVERSOBER, Shayra Apoorva, Siddhant Bhosle, Bhumika Anantharaman	-

== Filmography ==
=== Television ===
Year	Title	Role	Notes	Ref.
2019	The Kapil Sharma Show	Herself	Guest	
2024-present	Call Me Bae	Harleen Babbar	Debut	
2025-present	The Royals	Niki Kaushik		

== Awards and nominations ==
Year	Award	Category	Work	Result	Ref.
2025	Filmfare OTT Awards	Breakthrough Performance by a Newcomer (Female), Series	Call Me Bae	Won	
