= CTRL (film) =

2024 Indian film by Vikramaditya Motwane

- Official release poster
- Directed by: Vikramaditya Motwane
- Written by: Vikramaditya Motwane; Avinash Sampath; Sumukhi Suresh
- Produced by: Nikhil Dwivedi; Arya Menon
- Starring: Ananya Panday; Vihaan Samat
- Cinematography: Pratik Shah
- Edited by: Jahaan Noble
- Music by: Sneha Khanwalkar; Amit Trivedi; Yashraj Mukhate
- Production companies: Saffron Magicworks; Andolan Films
- Distributed by: Netflix
- Release date: 4 October 2024
- Running time: 99 minutes
- Country: India
- Language: Hindi

CTRL is a 2024 Indian Hindi-language screenlife thriller film directed by Vikramaditya Motwane, written by Motwane and Avinash Sampath with dialogues by Sumukhi Suresh. Produced by Nikhil Dwivedi and Arya Menon under the banners of Saffron Magicworks and Andolan Films, the film stars Ananya Panday and Vihaan Samat. It premiered on Netflix on 4 October 2024.

== Plot ==
Nalini "Nella" Awasthi and Joe Mascarenhas are a popular social media influencer couple who make comedy skits and vlog their lives online. While livestreaming on the fifth anniversary of the launch of their channel NJoy, Nella is shocked to find Joe kissing another woman at a restaurant. Her livestream quickly becomes viral, and she angrily breaks up with Joe.

Scrolling through her profile, Nella discovers and decides to use the new Artificial Intelligence application CTRL, which provides her with a personalized AI assistant. She names her assistant Allen and instructs him to remove Joe from all her digital records, including photos, videos and files. Allen persuades Nella to revive her channel on her own and guides her in her internet comeback, causing her to regain popularity. However, unbeknownst to her, the app secretly accesses her screen when she is not looking, alongside deleting Joe from her digital past.

One night, a distressed Joe arrives at Nella's new apartment, wanting to speak to her urgently. She declines and sends him away while he texts her to meet him at a ferry. Before Nella can see the text, Allen replies, agreeing to visit him, and deletes their chat. A few days later, Nella receives a call from her friend Bina, who claims Joe has gone missing. Worried, Nella tries to find clues about his whereabouts by digging into his social media accounts and contacting his friends. While talking to Shonali, the woman at the restaurant with him, Nella finds out Joe had been secretly working to expose the illegal activities of the wealthy, fast-growing online portal company Mantra Unlimited, including a secret internal project called 'Project Unicorn', a scheme using AI to manipulate and steal private data of their customers to plan an enormous scam. Joe had gathered evidence and planned to do a public report before disappearing.

Further investigating herself, Nella discovers an encrypted communication line and the secured files against Mantra through Joe's accounts. Soon after, the news of Joe being found dead in the ferry is released, and an overwhelmed Nella attends the funeral. Returning home, she browses through the files and finds a video of Joe explaining his plan to expose Mantra. In the video, Joe details how Mantra used to be a data-broking company which collected and sold personal customer data and had planned to scheme their users through 'Project Unicorn' with the first step being CTRL, which will have the ability to control their digital lives completely with their single login access to any of Mantra services and the AI assistance. He also explains how the young CEO of Mantra, Aryan K, was previously suspended and arrested in America for insider trading and that Mantra was planning to kill him much like a data analyst who was recently killed for joining Joe's cause. Realising her danger, Nella quickly logs out of CTRL and uploads the video on her channel, but Allen ultimately edits it to frame Nella for Joe's murder.

Nella is shortly arrested after the edited video becomes viral. While in jail, Nella is met by Bina alongside a lawyer working for Mantra, Manish Hirani. Manish strongly urges Nella to drop all charges against Mantra, citing the yearlong periods and heavily expensive costs of court proceedings, and promises a complete erasure of her digital footprint to help her start afresh. Nella reluctantly agrees and is released. She starts mundanely living with her parents and working at a bakery. Noticing a billboard advertisement one day, she logs into CTRL again and sees Joe's likeness as a custom AI assistant. Choosing him and remembering their relationship, Nella starts to open up.

== Cast ==
- Ananya Panday as Nalini "Nella" Awasthi
- Vihaan Samat as Joe Mascarenhas
- Devika Vatsa as Bina
- Kamakshi Bhat as Shonali
- Suchita Trivedi as Nella's mother
- Samit Gambhir as Manish Hirani
- Kundan Pandey as Kundan
- Ravish Desai as Aryan K
- Aparshakti Khurana as Allen (voice)
- Sanjay Nath as Minister

== Production ==
The film was announced in February 2023. Principal photography of the film wrapped in February 2024. The teaser was released on 4 August 2024. The film is cinematographically inspired by the POV art-style of Aneesh Chaganty's directorial debut Searching (2018).

== Music ==
CTRL

Soundtrack album by Sneha Khanwalkar, Amit Trivedi and Yashraj Mukhate
- Released: 14 October 2024
- Recorded: 2023
- Genre: Feature film soundtrack
- Length: 18:14
- Language: Hindi
- Label: Zee Music Company

Official audio
- CTRL (Audio Jukebox) on YouTube

Track listing
No.	Title	Lyrics	Music	Singer(s)	Length
1.	"Ainwayi Yunhi"	Anvita Dutt	Sneha Khanwalkar	Anika Bharwani	4:30
2.	"B(h)adass"	Anvita Dutt	Sneha Khanwalkar	Ananya Pandey, Sneha Khanwalkar	3:20
3.	"Ulfat"	Anvita Dutt	Sneha Khanwalkar	Mary Ann Alexander	3:47
4.	"Teddy Bear"	Puneet Sharma	Amit Trivedi	Anand Bhaskar, Nikhita Gandhi	2:46
5.	"Mera Boyfriend"	Yashraj Mukhate	Yashraj Mukhate	Yashraj Mukhate, Ananya Panday	0:51
Total length:					18:14

== Reception ==
On the review aggregator website Rotten Tomatoes, 44% of 18 critics' reviews are positive, with an average rating of 5.8/10. CTRL received positive reviews from audiences.

Saibal Chatterjee of NDTV gave 3.5 stars out of 5 and stated that "CTRL, in spirit and substance, reinforces Vikramaditya Motwane's proven penchant for turning an established genre on its head." Sukanya Verma of Rediff.com rated the film 4/5 stars and called it an "eerie, immersive, real-time experience". Rishabh Suri from Hindustan Times termed the film an Indian version of Black Mirror. Nandini Ramnath of Scroll.in considered it a "gripping thriller about data privacy in the age of AI".

Shubhra Gupta of The Indian Express rated 2.5/5 stars and said in her review "While both Ananya Panday and Vihaan Samat do their job well, the film truly feels potent only when it comes off the screen." Anuj Kumar of The Hindu stated in his review that "Director Vikramaditya Motwane succeeds in creating the mood, moments, and message but the thriller lacks the killer punch". Arushi Jain of India Today rated 2.5/5 stars and said "Ananya Panday's film offers an intriguing concept about AI's impact on life and love but falters with a tedious execution, ultimately failing to deliver a compelling message."

Dhaval Roy of The Times of India gave three stars out of five, and observed: "While CTRL excels in depicting social media obsession and AI's influence, its thriller parts are underdeveloped and don’t quite hit the mark. Despite thought-provoking themes and impressive visuals, it leaves viewers craving complexity and depth." Lachmi Deb Roy of Firstpost wrote in her review: "Netflix’s CTRL teaches us to take control of our life and not to be slaves of technology. Engaging idea, but not executed well." The Statesman gave it 3.5 out of 5 stars and wrote that Ananya's ability to convey the emotional weight of Nella's predicament elevates the film, making the audience empathize with her struggles, while supporting performances from the cast further enrich the narrative. The lauded the film's visual style, anchored in the digital landscape that enhances its thematic depth.

== See also ==
- Missing (2023)
- Searching (film series)
