= Call Me Bae =

Indian TV series

- Genre: Comedy drama
- Created by: Ishita Moitra
- Story by: Ishita Moitra; Samina Motlekar; Rohit Nair
- Directed by: Colin D'Cunha
- Starring: Ananya Panday
- Country of origin: India
- Original language: Hindi
- No. of episodes: 8

Production
- Executive producers: Karan Johar; Apoorva Mehta; Somen Mishra
- Running time: 36–44 minutes
- Production company: Dharmatic Entertainment

Original release
- Network: Amazon Prime
- Release: 6 September 2024 – present

Call Me Bae is an Indian Hindi-language comedy drama television series written by Ishita Moitra, Samina Motlekar and Rohit Nair directed by Colin D'Cunha. Produced under Dharmatic Entertainment, the series stars Ananya Panday in the title role, alongside an ensemble cast that includes Vir Das, Gurfateh Pirzada, Varun Sood, Vihaan Samat, Muskkaan Jaferi, Niharika Lyra Dutt, Lisa Mishra and Mini Mathur. It premiered on Amazon Prime on 6 September 2024 and has been renewed for a second season.

== Plot ==
Bella Rajvansh is a socialite-influencer who popularly goes by "Bae". Born into a wealthy family, Bae has been trained by her mother to a trophy wife. She is married off to rich businessman Agastya Chowdhary to secure the family's prosperity.

Bae begins to love Agastya but constantly feels ignored and lonely due to their daily fights. She cheats on him with her fitness trainer, Paras "Prince" Bhasin, and is caught by Agastya. Humiliated in front of potential business partners, Agastya rebuffs Bae's apologies and throws her out of the house; her family too disowns her.

Bae goes to Mumbai to get help from her brother Samar. Samar refuses to help her in order to protect his business partnership with Agastya. Frustrated, Bae declares that she does not need his help and that she will build her own life. Bae forms a friendship with Saira Ali, an employee at the hotel. She begins to stay at Saira's hostel as her roommate, and slowly learns how to navigate life with less money.

Satyajit Sen aka "SS" is the host of a show called The Confessional, run by a company called TRP, where he exposes the secrets of celebrities. Seeing one his episodes, a drunk Bae calls out his hypocrisy for wearing multiple foreign brands while claiming to wear only Indian-made clothing. Her speech is recorded and posted on social media, going viral. Neel Nair, another show host at TRP, sees potential in Bae as a journalist and recruits her as his intern, much to the dismay of SS, who constantly tries to make things hard for her. Bae moves in with her colleague, Tammarah, as her flatmate. Saira, kicked out of her hostel, also joins as another flatmate. Despite initial tussles, the three slowly bond. Prince tracks Bae and comes to meet her. Worried that her family will trouble him, she asks him to stay away for his own sake, but Prince stays nonetheless.

Bae receives an anonymous tape of a woman who blurs her face and calls herself Anamika. She reveals that Mukul Sawla, an influential businessman, has been blackmailing her to get her to sleep with him. Having seen Bae's fearless clip about SS's hypocrisy, Anamika asks her to bring Mukul's truth in front of the people, who consider him a feminist icon for giving free SIM cards to women. Bae, Saira and Tammarah start working on this case while Tammarah develops feelings for Prince. Meanwhile, Bae and Neel begin falling for each other and kiss one night, which is seen by Prince. He realises that he does not love Bae and realises his feelings for Tammarah. Bae and Prince mutually agree to move on. Tammarah and Prince begin dating.

Bae initially suspects Anamika to be Naina Khanna, a famous celebrity whose pregnancy was previously exposed by SS on The Confessional. Bae suspects that Mukul is blackmailing her as he is the father. However, Naina's boyfriend Vikram turns out to be the father and he publicly proposes to her, ruling her out from the list of suspects. Bae, noticing a limited edition Manish Malhotra designer bag in Anamika's video, asks her mother to get the list of that bag's buyers from Manish Malhotra. Despite displeased with Bae's current middle-class lifestyle, her mother helps her with the list. After further investigation via the list, Saira and Tammarah tell Bae that Anamika is none other than famous actress Madhulika Sahay. Madhulika confirms this when confronted, revealing she starred in an adult film when she was 17. Mukul has been using a copy of that film to blackmail her. Bae convinces Madhulika to publicly expose Mukul on her condition that Bae must delete Madhulika's film from Mukul's computer.

On Mukul's daughter's birthday party, Bae, Saira, Tammarah and Prince sneak in. Bae finds the laptop but Mukul sees her before she can find the file, forcing her to leave abruptly. Bae urges Madhulika to expose Mukul nonetheless, which her boyfriend overhears. However, he stands with her and assures that he still loves her. Madhulika finally goes live on Bae's instagram page and opens up about how Mukul has been harassing her. Overwhelming support floods in for her, while other women also open up about being sexually abused by Mukul.

SS, who has all along been in on Mukul's wrongdoings, plans to ruin Bae's image by inviting both her and Mukul as guests on the 100th episode of The Confessional. SS targets Bae and asks her uncomfortable questions regarding her infidelity, her strained relationship with her family and her record of shoplifting. Bae publicly admits to these mistakes but remains strong and ruthlessly questions Mukul. She shows the public screenshots from SS and Mukul's laptops, revealing how they have been collecting data on women via their SIM cards, allowing Mukul to blackmail them and SS to expose their secrets on The Confessional, such as Naina's pregnancy. SS is fired, while Mukul is disgraced and left by his wife.

Bae's mother, proud of her, reconciles with her. Her mother criticizes Samar for associating their company with Mukul even when Bae had warned him about Mukul's wrongdoings. Agastya too cuts off contact with him. Bae celebrates her victory and plans with Neel to start a show called "Call Me Bae", which Bae would host and Neel would produce. As Neel and Bae are about to kiss, Agastya shows up on her doorstep, declaring that he wants her back. Bae is torn about choosing between Neel and Agastya.

== Cast ==
- Ananya Panday as Bella "Bae" Chowdhary (née Rajwansh)
- Gurfateh Pirzada as Neel Nair, Managing Director of TRP
- Varun Sood as Prince Bhasin
- Muskkaan Jaferi as Saira Ali
- Vihaan Samat as Agastya Chowdhary, Bae's husband
- Vir Das as Satyajit Sen, The Confessional Show's host
- Mohit Chauhan as Tanmoy Lahiri
- Niharika Lyra Dutt as Tammarrah Pawwarh, reporter on TRP
- Lisa Mishra as Harleen Babbar, reporter on TRP
- Naman Arora as Shobit Adhikari, reporter on TRP
- Akashdeep Arora as Ashish Charak, sports reporter on TRP
- Shibesh Debnath as Murli
- Sameer Malhotra as Sanjay Rajwansh, Bae's father
- Mini Mathur as Gayatri Rajwansh, Bae's mother
- Shiv Masand as Samar Rajwansh, Bae's brother
- Beila Gupta as Reva Rajwansh, Bae's grandmother
- Chaitali Panchmatia as Prady
- Dia Soni as Tara, Bae's friend
- Krishna as Ahan, Bae's Mumbai roommate
- Desiree Sangma as Desiree, Bae's Mumbai roommate
- Pearl Boga as Veeral, Bae's Mumbai roommate
- Kevin Almasifar as Carl
- Sahil Shroff as Mukul Sawla
- Riya Sen as Mitali Sawla, Mukul's wife
- Suchitra Pillai as Mira Roy, Neel's mother
- Ashmita Jaggi as Ira Bose, Neel's ex-wife
- Riya Sisodiya as Anisha Mehra
- Naman Arora as Shobhit Adhikari
- Varinder Singh as Prateek
- Megha Agarwal as Meghna
- Arjun Kumar Giri as Watchman
- Tushar Bhardwaj as Yugandhar, guest on 'The Confessional'
- Mazez Singh as himself in a special appearance
- Karishma Tanna as Naina Khanna in a special appearance
- Urvashi Rautela as Diva Kapoor in a special appearance
- Sayani Gupta as Madhulika Sahay/Anamika in a special appearance
- Harman Singha as Tarun Kapoor in a special appearance
- Faye D'Souza as herself in a special appearance
- Orhan "Orry" Awantramani as himself in a special appearance

== Episodes ==
=== Season 1 (2024) ===
No. in season	Title	Directed by	Written by	Original release date
1	"The Golden Girl Messes Up"	Colin D'Cunha	Ishita Moitra	6 September 2024
2	"Bae in Bombay"	Colin D'Cunha	Ishita Moitra	6 September 2024
3	"Bae Gets to Work"	Colin D'Cunha	Ishita Moitra	6 September 2024
4	"Bae Tries to Fit In"	Colin D'Cunha	Ishita Moitra	6 September 2024
5	"Triple Trouble For Bae"	Colin D'Cunha	Ishita Moitra	6 September 2024
6	"Bae Tries to be a Journalist"	Colin D'Cunha	Ishita Moitra	6 September 2024
7	"Bae Cracks the Code"	Colin D'Cunha	Ishita Moitra	6 September 2024
8	"Bae's Revelations"	Colin D'Cunha	Ishita Moitra	6 September 2024

== Production ==
The series was announced by Dharmatic Entertainment on Amazon Prime Video. The principal photography of the series commenced in March 2023, with Ananya Pandey joining the cast. In August 2023, Vir Das was confirmed to be a part of the cast. The filming was wrapped-up in October 2023 after 55 days and post-production was completed in July 2024.

== Soundtrack ==
Call Me Bae

Soundtrack album by Rochak Kohli, Ruuh and Abhijeet Srivastava
- Released: 1 September 2024
- Genre: Soundtrack
- Length: 29:00
- Language: Hindi
- Label: Sony Music India

Official audio
- Call Me Bae - Audio Jukebox on YouTube

The series has following tracks:

Track listing
No.	Title	Singer(s)	Length
1.	"Vekh Sohneyaa"	Bombay the Artist, Charan	3:36
2.	"Churaaiyaan"	Abhijeet Srivastava, Shayra Apoorva, Mudit Chaturvedi, Suvarna Tiwari	3:48
3.	"Warey"	Abhijeet Srivastava, Shloke Lal	2:51
4.	"Baatein"	Ruuh, Joh, Smriti Bhoker, Delraaz Bunshah	2:21
5.	"Khwaish Poori"	Rochak Kohli, Gurpreet Saini, Jubin Nautiyal, Sanjoy	2:42
6.	"Yaara Tere Bin"	Ruuh, Joh, Lisa Mishra, Smriti Bhoker	2:49
7.	"Kyaa Karun"	Pranay Parti, Danish Sood	2:37
8.	"Khwaish Adhoori"	Rochak Kohli, Gurpreet Saini, Akanksha Sethi, Sanjoy	4:00
9.	"Yaara Tere Bin"	Ruuh, Joh, Lisa Mishra, Smriti Bhoker	1:50
10.	"Mumbai Hustle"	Shravan Mantri, Naamkarn, Rajjo	2:52
Total length:			29:00

== Reception ==
Shubhra Gupta of The Indian Express rated it 2.5 stars out of 5 and stated that "Ananya Panday's show is self-aware to the right degree by sending itself up just enough, not letting self-righteousness weigh its exaggerations down. It’s only when it starts getting too woke and serious that it bites off more than it can chew." Saibal Chatterjee of NDTV also gave 2.5 stars out of 5 and said "Ananya Panday etches out a relatable figure who is worth rooting for". Sukanya Verma of Rediff.com rated 3.5 stars out of 5 and gave a positive response saying "Call Me Bae is a spirited new addition in guilty pleasures for the fashion-loving, rom-com starved soul". Shilajit Mitra of The Hindu criticised the writing of the series, saying "Aiming for the snacky frivolity of Western sitcoms, this riches-to-rags comedy, led by Panday and Vir Das and created by Ishita Moitra, needed better writing". Devansh Sharma of Hindustan Times stated in his review that "Ananya Panday owns her privilege in Ishita Moitra, Collin D'Cunha's self-deprecatory show that grows to have a purpose like its protagonist." Archika Khurana of The Times of India rated 3.5 stars stated in her conclusion that "Call Me Bae is a stylish comedy-drama that stands out by frequently mocking its absurdities, adding an element of self-aware humor. While the show boasts strong performances and high production values, it doesn’t offer much new storytelling."
