= Aaliyah Qureishi =

Indian singer

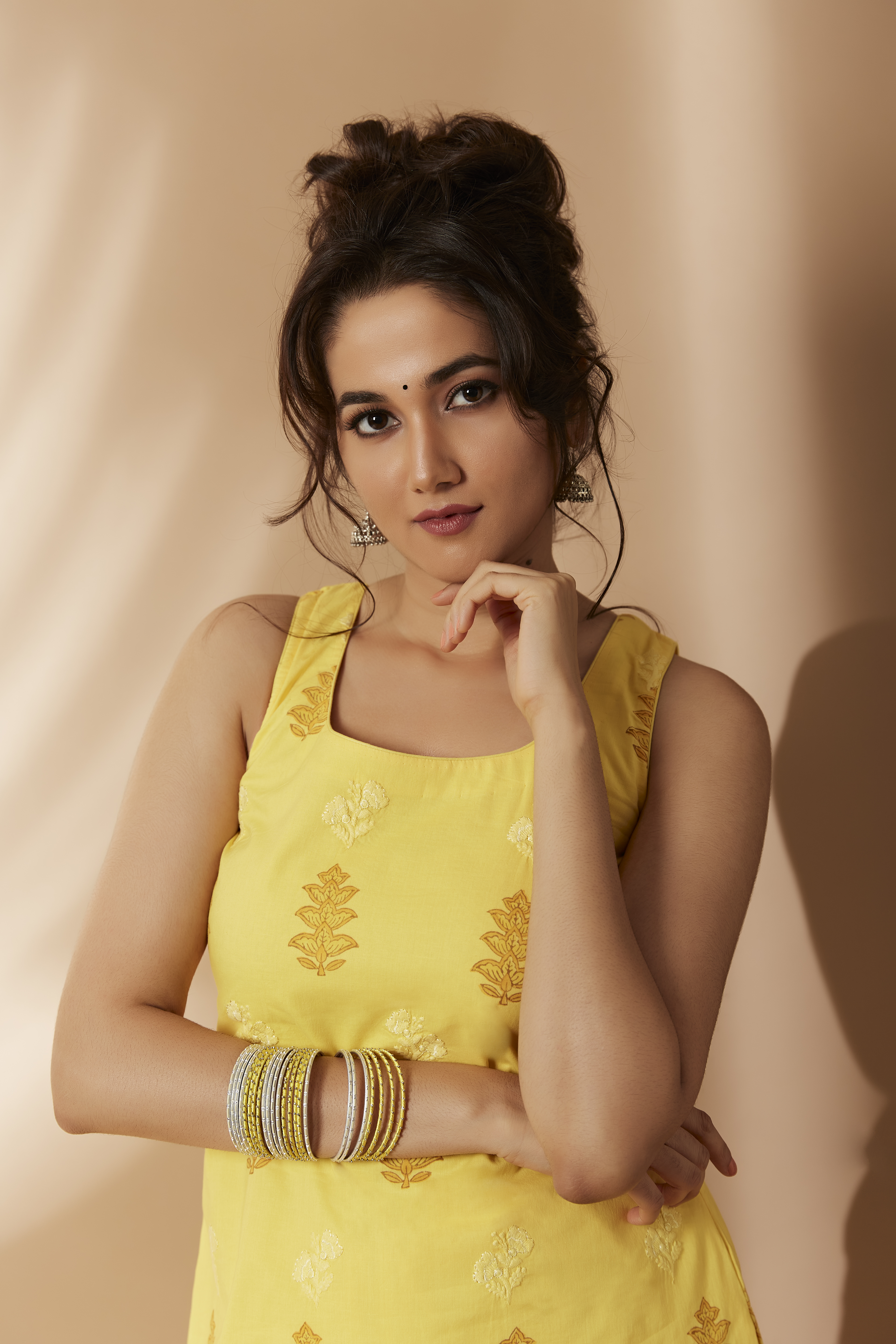
- Qureishi in 2020

Background information
- Born
- Genre: Indie pop
- Occupations: Singer-songwriter, actor, lyricist

Aaliyah Qureishi is an Indian singer-songwriter and actress. She made her Bollywood debut with the 2023 Indian Hindi-language action thriller film Jawan co-written and directed by Atlee, she later portrayed the character of Sahira in the 2025 Netflix film Naadaniyan starring Ibrahim Ali Khan and Khushi Kapoor. She has also appeared in television series such as Bandish Bandits and Eternally Confused and Eager for Love.

== Career ==
In addition to acting, Qureishi is also known by her music alias "Jhalli" (lit. 'Crazy'). She released her first single "Pretty" in 2018 and has since produced several tracks including "Mukaddar" (2022), "Paraye" (2023), and "Don't Come Back" (2023). Her debut EP titled Why Should I? was released in 2022. She composed the song "You and I" for the television series Bandish Bandits.

== Awards and nominations ==
Year	Award	Category	Work	Result	Ref.
2025	IIFA Digital Awards	Best Supporting Actress – Series	Bandish Bandits	Nominated	
2025	Times of India Film Awards	Debut Actor of the Year – Web Series with exceptional talent	Bandish Bandits	Nominated	

== Discography ==
=== Singles ===
Year	Track	Genre	Language	Reference
2018	"Pretty"	Indie rock	English	
2020	"Marceline"	Indie rock	English	
2020	"I Want to Be Free"	Indie rock	English	
2022	"Dream Girl"	Pop	English	
2022	"stupid games"	Pop	English	
2022	"let me be ur girl"	Pop	English	
2022	"Why Should I (Interlude)"	Pop	English	
2022	"HURRICANE"	Pop	English	
2022	"insecurity"	Pop	English	
2022	"Mukaddar"	Pop	Hindi	
2023	"Paraye"	Pop	Hindi	
2023	"Don't Come Back"	Pop	English	
2024	"You and I"		English	

== Filmography ==
=== Web series ===
Year	Web series	Role	Language	Reference
2022	Eternally Confused and Eager for Love	Jia	Hindi, English	
2024	Bandish Bandits	Ananya	Hindi	

=== Films ===
Year	Films	Role	Language	Reference
2023	Jawan	Janvi	Hindi	
2025	Nadaaniyan	Sahira	Hindi	
