= Eternally Confused and Eager for Love =

Indian comedy drama series

- Genre: Comedy drama
- Created by: Rahul Nair
- Directed by: Rahul Nair
- Starring: Vihaan Samat; Rahul Bose; Suchitra Pillai; Dalai; Ankur Rathee; Jim Sarbh
- Composer: Sid Shirodkar
- Country of origin: India
- Original language: English
- No. of series: 1
- No. of episodes: 8

Production
- Executive producers: Farhan Akhtar; Zoya Akhtar; Reema Kagti; Ritesh Sidhwani; Zoya Parvin; Angad Dev Singh; Kassim Jagmagia
- Cinematography: Krish Makhija; Sunil Borkar(2nd Unit DOP)
- Editor: Manan Ashwin Mehta
- Camera setup: Multi-camera
- Running time: 30 minutes
- Production companies: Excel Entertainment; Tiger Baby Films

Original release
- Network: Netflix
- Release: 18 March 2022

Eternally Confused and Eager for Love is an Indian comedy drama television series created and directed by Rahul Nair, produced by Farhan Akhtar, Ritesh Sidhwani, Zoya Akhtar and Reema Kagti under the banner of Excel Entertainment and Tiger Baby Films. It stars Vihaan Samat as Ray and Jim Sarbh in a voice role as Ray's inner voice Wiz, with Dalai, Ankur Rathee, Rahul Bose and Suchitra Pillai in supporting roles. The series premiered on Netflix on 18 March 2022.

== Overview ==
Ray, 24, is back from college and has a job as a financial analyst, well on his way to a colorless routine that his wealthy parents would be proud of. All he needs now is to find that perfect match, fall in love, get married, have kids and well, you know the drill... But that's the thing – despite the imminent normalcy, Ray is of the staunch opinion that he is an average looking guy. He thinks his face is odd and asymmetrical, and this clearly means that no girl will ever even look at him. He's got the perfect job, but what's the point if he can't so much as make eye contact with a woman without absolutely freaking out?

In moments of panic, Ray turns to Wiz, a toy wizard. Wiz serves as Ray's inner voice, questioning every inch of his life. Wiz is in many ways, a higher power, integral to Ray's ethos, but of course, even he cannot help Ray.

Love travels at the speed of light these days. A young man like Ray could go from liking a girl's picture on Instagram, to falling in love with her, to feeling heartbroken, in the space of minutes. Are things easier for all the hopeless romantics out there, or have they actually become infinitely more complicated? Is Ray truly looking for love or does he just want to have sex? Romance is extremely important to Ray, but there is nothing romantic about the way he goes about looking for love.

When Ray decides to do something about his single status, he kickstarts an adventure that he is unable to handle, when his parents, full of hope, set him up with a close family friend's daughter.

Ray is helped along the way by his best friend Riya, the type of girl that Ray would probably be in love with if he hadn't known her for so long; his closest colleague Varun, a confident and handsome version of Ray; and his parents Gaurav and Meena, riding the carousel of their successful married lives, constantly arguing and yet somehow dropping great advice when Ray least expects it and most needs it.

But despite it all, when Ray stands before a beautiful young woman waiting expectantly for something to come out of his mouth, everything disappears. There's no city, no dating apps, no parents, no friends, and no inner voice.

It's just Ray. Eternally confused and eager for love.

== Cast and characters ==
- Vihaan Samat as Ray
- Jim Sarbh as Wiz (voiceover)
- Dalai Mulchandani as Riya
- Devika Vatsa as Komal
- Tanya Kalra as Naina
- Kajol Chugh as Sonali
- Namrata Sheth as Pari
- Aaliyah Qureishi as Jia
- Larissa Dsa as Priyanka
- Niharika Lyra Dutt as Ruchika
- Ankur Rathee as Varun
- Rahul Bose as Gaurav, Ray's father
- Suchitra Pillai as Meena, Ray's mother
- Faezeh Jalali as Pushpa
- Swati Bakshi as Girl at bar counter
- Himanee Bhatia
- Ayana Gaziz as Miyu Kibishi
- Norikazu Maeda as Mr. Kibishi
- Eshika Dey as Shanti
- Aishwarya Sushmita as Cocoanut Model
- Jason Arland as Sandesh
- LLavi Tyagi as Vicky

== Development ==
=== Production ===
The series was announced in December 2020 and a teaser of the series was released on 17 February 2022.

=== Release ===
The trailer of the series was released on 18 February 2022 consisting of eight episodes premiered on Netflix on 18 March 2022.

== Episodes ==
No.	Title	Directed by	Original release date
1	"Origin Story"	Rahul Nair	18 March 2022
To save face, Ray lies about a big life event, but his friends react unexpectedly. A date set up by his mother holds promise, unless nerves take over.
2	"Blind Date"	Rahul Nair	18 March 2022
Ray chooses not to look up photos of a date before he meets her - a decision that leads him to take a hard look in the mirror at his own reflection.
3	"Stag Entry"	Rahul Nair	18 March 2022
Ray panics over a looming dinner at Pari's, but when plans change, he faces an even scarier night: a club, dancing and a girl who takes interest in him
4	"Second Chance"	Rahul Nair	18 March 2022
When an opportunity for another shot with Pari has Ray newly optimistic, advice for how not to mess it up comes from an unlikely source.
5	"Foolproof"	Rahul Nair	18 March 2022
Ray wavers between pursuing Ruchika and telling Pari a dreaded truth. Meanwhile, a flawed plan reveals he still has lots to understand about women.
6	"Homecoming"	Rahul Nair	18 March 2022
Mortified after the previous night, Ray indulges in some alone time, finally responds to Ruchika and some awkward encounters at a house party.
7	"Double Trouble"	Rahul Nair	18 March 2022
With his job and personal life tanking, Ray looks to an unexpected online match for cheering up, and tries a new approach on his date with Ruchika.
8	"Ray + Who? = Love"	Rahul Nair	18 March 2022
Before Varun's engagement party, Ray mends a burned bridge. But at the event, fragile hope, loneliness and several drinks may add up to trouble.

== Reception ==
Kusumita Das of Firstpost stated that "The show is a zeitgeist of the times we live in, but do not go looking for emotional complexities and nuance, On the other side it keeps you occupied but makes you feel empty."
