= The Royals (2025 TV series) =

Indian television series

- Genre: Romantic comedy; Drama
- Created by: Rangita Pritish Nandy; Ishita Pritish Nandy
- Written by: Neha Veena Sharma
- Directed by: Priyanka Ghose; Nupur Asthana
- Starring: Ishaan Khatter; Bhumi Pednekar
- Country of origin: India
- Original language: Hindi
- No. of episodes: 8

Production
- Producer: Pritish Nandy
- Camera setup: Multi-camera
- Running time: 39–49 minutes
- Production company: Pritish Nandy Communications

Original release
- Network: Netflix
- Release: 9 May 2025

The Royals is a 2025 Indian Hindi-language romantic comedy drama television series directed by Priyanka Ghose and Nupur Asthana and written by Neha Veena Sharma. Produced by Pritish Nandy Communications, the series stars an ensemble cast including Bhumi Pednekar, Ishaan Khatter, Zeenat Aman, Sakshi Tanwar, Nora Fatehi, Vihaan Samat, Dino Morea, and Milind Soman. The narrative follows a financially struggling royal family in modern-day India whose fortunes take an unexpected turn when the heir teams up with a hospitality entrepreneur to revive their ancestral palace as a luxury resort.

The series premiered on Netflix on May 9, 2025, and received mixed reviews from critics. While the performances of Khatter, Samat, and Tanwar, and its costumes and production design was widely praised, Pednekar's chemistry with Khatter was panned, the direction was considered underwhelming and the storyline drew criticism for lacking emotional depth. The series was renewed for a second season on May 28, 2025.

== Cast ==
- Bhumi Pednekar as Sophia Kanmani Shekhar, CEO of Work Potato
- Ishaan Khatter as Maharaj Aviraaj "Fizzy" Singh, Maharaja of Morpur and Sophia's love interest.
- Sakshi Tanwar as Maharani Padmaja "Paddy" Singh, Morpur; Maharaj Yuvanath Singh's wife; Fizzy, Diggy, and Jinnie's mother
- Zeenat Aman as Rajmata Maji Saheba Bhagyashree Devi, the matriarch of Motibagh Palace, Morpur
- Vihaan Samat as Yuvaraj Digvijay "Diggy" Singh, Morpur
- Kavya Trehan as Yuvarani Divyaranjini "Jinnie" Singh, Morpur
- Udit Arora as Kunal Mehta, Sophia's ex and CFO of Work Potato
- Nora Fatehi as Ayesha Dhondi, Fizzy's ex
- Dino Morea as Nawab Salauddin "Salad" Khan, Alsipur
- Milind Soman as former Maharaj Yuvanath Singh, Morpur
- Chunky Panday as Ranjit Shroff
- Lisa Mishra as Niki Kaushik
- Sumukhi Suresh as Keerthana
- Luke Kenny as Adi Mehta / 'Maurice'
- Adinath Kothare as Zubin Daruwala
- Alyy Khan as Nawab of Dhondi
- Shweta Salve as Sameera Kashyap
- Yashaswini Dayama as Molshri Mittal
- Shivani Tanksale as Rambha
- Neena Kulkarni as Sophia's grandmother
- Jagdish Rajpurohit as Girdhari

== Episodes ==
=== Season 1 (2025) ===
No. in	Title	Directed by	Written by	Original release date
1	"A Royal Misunderstanding."	Priyanka Ghose	Neha Veena Sharma	9 May 2025
2	"A Pitch Made in Heaven."	Priyanka Ghose	Neha Veena Sharma	9 May 2025
3	"A Swing and a Ms."	Priyanka Ghose	Iti Agarwal	9 May 2025
4	"A Ball to Remember."	Nupur Asthana	Vishnu Sinha and Neha Veena Sharma	9 May 2025
5	"The Ex-Factor."	Priyanka Ghose	Iti Agarwal and Neha Veena Sharma	9 May 2025
6	"The Maharaja and the CEO."	Priyanka Ghose	Vishnu Sinha	9 May 2025
7	"The Maharaja who Loved."	Nupur Asthana	Neha Veena Sharma and Vishnu Sinha	9 May 2025
8	"Lights, Camera, AUCTION!"	Priyanka Ghose	Neha Veena Sharma	9 May 2025

== Production ==
=== Development ===
The series was officially commissioned by Netflix, with Priyanka Ghose and Nupur Asthana attached to direct. Production was handled by Pritish Nandy Communications.

=== Casting ===
Bhumi Pednekar and Ishaan Khatter were cast in the lead roles. Sakshi Tanwar joined the ensemble following the departure of Mallika Sherawat, who exited the project due to creative differences.

=== Filming ===
Principal photography began in February 2024 and concluded in May 2024. The series was filmed primarily on location in Jaipur and Mumbai.

== Soundtrack ==
The Royals

Soundtrack album
- Released: 5 May 2025
- Genre: Soundtrack
- Length: 20:04
- Language: Hindi
- Label: Universal Music India

The series features a recreated version of the song "Tu Tu Hai Wahi" from the 1982 film Yeh Vaada Raha, originally sung by Kishore Kumar and Asha Bhosle. A promotional event for the song, scheduled to take place in Juhu on 8 May 2025, was cancelled by Netflix in response to the 2025 India–Pakistan strikes.

Track listing
No.	Title	Lyrics	Music	Singer(s)	Length
1.	"Tu Tu Hai Wahi"	Gulshan Bawra	R.D.Burman, RUUH, JOH	Asha Bhosle, Jonita Gandhi, Jubin Nautiyal, RUUH, JOH	2:35
2.	"Who Rules The World"	Sukriti Bhardwaj	Harsh Upadhyay	Sukriti Bhardwaj, Anish Mathew	2:41
3.	"Adayein Teri"	Smriti Bhoker, RUUH, JOH	RUUH, JOH	Savera, Neeti Mohan, RUUH, JOH	2:50
4.	"Dil Deewana"	Smriti Bhoker, RUUH, JOH	RUUH, JOH	Sukriti Kakkar, RUUH, JOH	2:56
5.	"Dhun"	Swati Marwal	Aditya N., Nayantara Bhatkal	Aditya N., Nayantara Bhatkal	3:06
6.	"Jeena"	Yashwardhan Goswami	Kanishk Seth	Akanksha Bhandari	3:22
7.	"Ecstasy"	Smriti Bhoker	RUUH, JOH	Jonita Gandhi, Jubin Nautiyal, RUUH, JOH	2:34
Total length:					20:04

== Release ==
The first teaser for The Royals was released on 3 February 2025, followed by the official trailer on 22 April 2025.

The series was made available for streaming on Netflix on 9 May 2025.

== Reception ==
Sukanya Verma of Rediff.com rated the series 2 out of 5 stars. In her review, she criticized the show's emphasis on surface-level aesthetics, remarking that "everything is seen through the prism of sex and good looks." She argued that the narrative—centered on a financially strained royal family launching a hospitality venture—lacked narrative depth and relied excessively on visual appeal.

Shubhra Gupta from The Indian Express also awarded the series 2 out of 5 stars, describing it as "all show." She observed that the production "struggles for air under all that costumery," suggesting that elaborate visuals could not compensate for its lack of narrative substance. Gupta also found the central romantic arc underwhelming, stating that "all that coupling... doesn’t really get as steamy as it should have."

Abhimanyu Mathur of Hindustan Times offered a more favorable view, rating the series 3 out of 5 stars. He described it as a "fun rom-com" that balances frivolity with occasional emotional weight. Mathur praised the chemistry between the lead actors and drew comparisons to Bridgerton, writing that the series effectively combines Bollywood elements with a period-drama sensibility. While noting its imperfections, he concluded that it was a "much-needed clutter-breaker" in the Indian streaming landscape.

Pallavi Keswani of The Hindu was more critical of the series, stating that it "finds itself creatively lacking despite possessing a long list of talented names." She argued that the show failed to leverage its ensemble cast into compelling drama, citing an absence of innovation or originality in its storytelling.

== See also ==
- List of Netflix India originals
- List of Netflix original programming
