= Dhirubhai Ambani International School =

Private dayschool in Mumbai, Maharashtra, India

Location
- BKC, Bandra East, Mumbai, Maharashtra 400098; 19.066725°N 72.870464°E

Information
- Type: Private
- Motto: "Dare to Dream, Learn to Excel"
- Patron saint: Dhirubhai Ambani
- Established: 2003; 23 years ago
- Chairperson: Nita Ambani
- Dean: Abhimanyu Basu
- Faculty: 190
- Grades: K-12
- Enrollment: 1000
- Website: www.dais.edu.in

The Dhirubhai Ambani International School (DAIS) is a private co-educational LKG-15 day school in Mumbai, Maharashtra, India, built by Reliance Industries, named after the late patriarch of the conglomerate, Dhirubhai Ambani. The school was established in 2003 and has been an IB World School since January 2003. It offers the International Baccalaureate Program in its Diploma form. Nita Ambani, wife of Mukesh Ambani is the chairperson of the school.

The school prepares students for the Indian Certificate of Secondary Education, the International General Certificate of Secondary Education and the IB Diploma examinations.

== System of education ==
=== Primary School (PYP): Nursery to Class 5 ===
The Primary School programme comprises Nursery, Lower and Upper Kindergarten (LKG and UKG) years and classes I to V through its sister wing, the Nita Mukesh Ambani Junior School (NMAJS). In classes Nursery to V, the school follows the IBMYP.

=== Middle Years' Programme (IBMYP): Classes 6 and 7 ===
The Middle School Programme i.e. classes 6 and 7. The IBMYP is followed by the school.

=== Secondary school ===
The school follows the Cambridge International Education (CIE) IGCSE board grades 8-10, with the CIE IGCSE board exams conducted in the month of May each year. After grade 10, the school transitions into the IBDP for grades 11-12, with board exams for the same conducted in May each year.

=== Post Secondary School ===
Dhirubhai Ambani International School has been an IB World School since January 2003. It offers the IB Diploma Programme.

== Facilities ==
The school building has eight storeys with an additional terrace with sports facilities. There are also lawns, landscaped gardens, treehouses and playgrounds. The school premises, housing 130,000 square feet (12,000 m^{2}) of teaching space containing classrooms and laboratories, is fully air-conditioned.

Every classroom has a public address system, display and writing boards, lockers for students, broadband Internet access and air conditioning. There is schoolwide Wi-Fi internet access for the students of grades 3-7 affiliated with the IBMYP board, for students of grades 8-10 affiliated with the IGCSE board and its 11th and 12th graders, in the IBDP. There are laboratories for Physics, Chemistry and Biology and teaching rooms for Art, Music, Social Science, Languages, Computer Studies, and Mathematics.

The school has a Learning Centre with access to periodicals and audio-visual resources, the internet and photocopying/printing facilities. The school has a terrace garden for its art students and a performing arts centre with sound proof walls and professional AV technology.

It shares a playground with the American School of Bombay with an astroturf, tennis and basketball courts for outdoor sports. Indoor sports are also facilitated, such as table tennis, chess and mallakhamb. In addition, there is a modern gymnasium with free weights and machines for students in grades 9 and above. The Dhirubhai Ambani International School Study and Activity Centre situated in Matheran, 100 km from Mumbai, opened in 2008. It is used for cross-curricular, recreational activities as well as for weekend training camps and Physical Education activities.

=== Student Council ===
The school has four houses: Panthers (blue), Tigers (green), Jaguars (red) and Lions (yellow). Each house has two house captains (boy and girl), one sports captain, two vice house captains (boy and girl) and one vice sports captain.

The council Core positions are Head Boy, Head Girl, two Student Council Coordinators, two Sports Coordinators, one Round Square Student Committee Chair, one Communications Coordinator, one Vice Student Council Coordinator, one vice Communications Coordinatorand one Vice Sports Coordinator.

The council is selected on a non-democratic basis (incoming members are largely selected by the teachers, heads and outgoing members). The council is usually changed in December each year.

=== Model United Nations ===
The school hosts an annual Model United Nations (MUN) conference called The Dhirubhai Ambani International Model United Nations (DAIMUN) in October. The conference is one of two conferences in India to be affiliated with The Hague International Model United Nations (THIMUN) Foundation.

== Activities and achievements ==
- Global Membership of Round Square (2008)
- Member of the Council of International Schools (CIS) (2008)

== Social initiatives ==
- Students work with Indian NGOs such as IDF, Advitya, Akanksha, CCDT, Muktangan, Pratham, Eve, Dr. Bhau Daji Lad Museum, Village Project, Maharashtra Nature Park, Goonj and Ishara. The Dhirubhai Ambani International School Akanksha Centre has been set up as part of this programme.
- "DAISight" is a student-initiated organization in affiliation with Lotus Eye College and the Mumbai Eye Care Campaign. DAISight towards improving and spreading awareness of eyecare around Mumbai.
- "Across the Road" is a service project supporting children in slum areas adjacent to the school in educational and developmental needs.
- The "Village Project", born in 2009, and called Empowering Rural India, is a school project where villages are adopted with the objective of eradicating poverty and unemployment through a three-pronged strategy – Education, Infrastructure and Empowerment. This helps the school achieve the UN Millennium Development Objectives as well as the IB Mission goals: "Think Globally and Act Locally." The school tries to improve means of income generation, empower women and allowing them to contribute to the household income, and implement the infrastructure for health care, education, and communication. The two villages are Hassachipatti and Kumbharghar.

== Notable alumni ==
=== Business ===
- Shikhar Pahariya

=== Entertainment ===
- Ananya Panday – actress
- Sara Ali Khan – actress
- Vihaan Samat – actor
- Alizeh Agnihotri – actress
- Aryan Khan
- Janhvi Kapoor – actress
- Khushi Kapoor – actress
- Ibrahim Ali Khan – actor

=== Sports ===
- Arjun Tendulkar – professional cricketer
- Agni Chopra – Cricketer who plays in MI New york

== See also ==
- List of schools in Mumbai
- The Scindia School
- Woodstock School
- Welham Girls' School
