= Bandar (film) =

2025 Indian film by Anurag Kashyap

- Theatrical release poster
- Directed by: Anurag Kashyap; Sakshi Mehta
- Written by: Sudip Sharma; Abhishek Banerjee
- Produced by: Anurag Kashyap; Nikhil Dwivedi; Shivie Pandit; Gaurie Pandit
- Starring: Bobby Deol; Sanya Malhotra; Sapna Pabbi; Saba Azad; Indrajith Sukumaran; Raj B. Shetty; Jitendra Joshi
- Cinematography: Saiyed Shaaz Rizvi
- Edited by: Aarti Bajaj
- Music by: Score: Shivahari Varma; Songs: Amit Trivedi; Vishal Mishra; Sapan–Jagmohan; Payal Dev–Aditya Dev; Sickflip; Blurface; Shivahari Varma
- Production company: Saffron Magicworks
- Distributed by: Zee Studios
- Release dates: 6 September 2025 (TIFF); 5 June 2026 (India)
- Running time: 136 minutes
- Country: India
- Language: Hindi
- Box office: ₹5.45 crore

Bandar (transl. Monkey), released internationally as Monkey in a Cage is a 2025 Indian Hindi-language crime thriller film directed by Anurag Kashyap and produced by Nikhil Dwivedi under his banner Saffron Magicworks. The film written by Sudip Sharma and Abhishek Banerjee is inspired by a real-life event. The film stars Bobby Deol in the title role, alongside Sanya Malhotra, Sapna Pabbi, Saba Azad, Indrajith Sukumuran, Raj B. Shetty and Jitendra Joshi. It revolves around an aging television star who gets accused of rape by his ex-girlfriend.

The film premiered at the Special Presentations Program of the 2025 Toronto International Film Festival on 6 September 2025. and was theatrically released on 5 June 2026 to positive reviews from critics.

== Plot ==
Samar Mehra is a not-so-young TV star whose fame is fading. He is a profoundly flawed man who is out of touch with changing attitudes about gender and power. He is happy in his new relationship with a young woman, Khushi, when his ex, Gayatri, tries to return to his life. He cuts off all contact and blocks her. But things take a serious turn when Gayatri accuses him of rape. He is soon arrested and faces a corrupt legal system determined to keep him in jail. Riddled with suspense and shifting alliances, this story of love, lies, and responsibility takes nothing for granted as it reshapes Samar's life. Told through a flashback narrative, the film reconstructs past events leading to the central incident, presenting the story in a manner that encourages viewers to draw their own conclusions about the characters and their motivations.

== Cast ==
- Bobby Deol as Samar Mehra
- Sanya Malhotra as Suhaani Mehra, Samar's sister
- Sapna Pabbi as Gayatri, Samar’s ex-girlfriend
- Saba Azad as Khushi, Samar’s girlfriend
- Indrajith Sukumaran as Lijo
- Raj B. Shetty as Lizard Man
- Jitendra Joshi as Deore
- Nagesh Bhonsle as Papa Jacob
- Riddhi Sen as Nikhil, Samar's lawyer
- Nikhat Khan as Samar's mother
- Prithvi Zutshi as Samar's father
- Uday Tikekar as Judge
- Ghanshyam Garg as Shiva
- Aamir Aziz as Guddu
- Ankush Gedam as Bilal
- Sukant Goel as Aatish
- Sanjay Gandhi as Desai
- Santosh Juvekar as Hemant
- Thomas Jacob as Vitthal
- Aurobindo Bhattacharjee as Gayatri's Lawyer
- Sunny Leone as Herself (Special appearance)
- Daniel Weber as Himself (Special appearance)

== Production ==
The film is an adaptation of Anurag Kashyap's unpublished story written with two other authors, and has screenplay by Sudip Sharma and Abhishek Banerjee. Principal photography of the film began on 14 May 2024 in Mumbai.

== Soundtrack ==
Bandar

Soundtrack album by Vishal Mishra, Aditya Dev, Amit Trivedi, Blurface, Sickflip and Shivahari Varma
- Released: 21 May 2026
- Genre: Feature film soundtrack
- Length: 19:00
- Language: Hindi
- Label: Saregama
External audio
- Official Audio Jukebox on YouTube

=== Track listing ===
| No. | Title | Lyrics | Music | Singer(s) | Length |
|---|---|---|---|---|---|
| 1. | "Kyun Mazaa Aa Raha Hai" | Shashwat Dwivedi | Vishal Mishra, Aditya Dev | Vishal Mishra | 3:10 |
| 2. | "Pinjara" | Sudip Sharma | Amit Trivedi | Amit Trivedi | 3:54 |
| 3. | "Aaropi" | 100RBH | Blurface | 100RBH | 3:49 |
| 4. | "Mumbai Sheher" | MC Maharya, MC Mawali | Sickflip | MC Maharya, MC Mawali | 3:07 |
| 5. | "Ram Siya Ram" | Traditional Bhajan | Shivahari Varma | Shivahari Varma | 3:06 |
| 6. | "Chandra Chooda Shivashankara" | Traditional Bhajan | Shivahari Varma | Shivahari Varma | 1:58 |
| Total length: | | | | | 19.0 |

== Release ==
=== Theatrical ===
Bandar / Monkey in a Cage premiered at the 2025 Toronto International Film Festival on 6 September 2025. The film was released theatrically on 5 June 2026.

=== Home media ===
The film began streaming on ZEE5 from 28 August 2026.

== Reception ==
On the review aggregator website Rotten Tomatoes, 92% of 12 critics' reviews are positive, with an average rating of 6.6/10.

Shubhra Gupta of The Indian Express awarded 3 stars out 5 and writes that the film was "Kashyap's strongest film in a while, its spare, scrappy style working in tandem with the story which chooses to show us a man who may not be as black as he's painted out to be, but is not all white either." Nandini Ramnath of Scroll.in observes that "Although Bandar isn’t primarily meant to be a prison drama, that’s what it ends up being. The 136-minute narrative turns itself over to Samar’s plight behind bars, losing proportion, focus and balance in the bargain." Saibal Chatterjee of NDTV rated it 2.5/5 stars and said that the film was a "bit of a tangle that is hard to wrap one's head and heart around." Mayur Sanap of Rediff.com gave 3 stars out of and noted, "The greatest pleasure of Bandar is watching Bobby Deol let go of his vanity and submit himself to Anurag Kashyap's unflinching filmmaking." Sana Farzeen of India Today gave 2.5 stars out of 5 and writes that "Bandar lingers... In a haunting monologue, Samar talks about forgetting his own face inside prison and becoming a ghost."

Rishabh Suri of Hindustan Times gave 3.5 stars out of 5 and writes that "Overall, despite losing some momentum in the latter half, Bandar remains an engaging watch. It succeeds because it stays focused on the human cost of an accusation and the circus that follows. In an era where public opinion often arrives before the facts, the film feels timely and relevant." Vinamra Mathur of Firstpost also gave 3.5 stars out of 5 and said that "once Bandar ends, one gets a sense this is a film that refuses to give easy answers. If we don’t get to see the victim as much as the accused, it has less to do with the fact that the story is being told from the accused’s lens and more to do with how Kashyap revels in the ambiguity of his narratives." BH Harsh of Cinema Express rated it 3/5 stars out of 5 and calls it "While the central premise itself is shaky, Anurag Kashyap puts his best foot forward to paint the picture of a broken man who gets further destroyed by the system". Renuka Vyavahare of The Times of India gave 3.5 stars out of 5 and writes that "This is not an easy film to watch. It is disturbing, repulsive and occasionally repetitive. Think of horror sensation Obsession in an Anurag Kashyap universe. But that discomfort is precisely the point." Devesh Sharma of Filmfare gave 4 stars out of 5 and praise the film writing that the film was "messy, overstuffed and occasionally frustrating. Yet it is also fearless, thought-provoking and fiercely acted. In an era increasingly dominated by safe storytelling and formulaic entertainment, director Anurag Kashyap deserves enormous credit for making a film that embraces discomfort and uncertainty."

The film received criticism from some viewers for its misogynistic undertones, who said that its themes were out of touch with the MeToo movement. Kashyap acknowledged the validity of the criticisms, and further stated that the final cut of the film was not his original, and therefore he distanced himself from the film. Ironically, the film is his highest rated directorial feature on Rotten Tomatoes since Lust Stories (2018).
