= Vihaan Samat =

Indian Actor

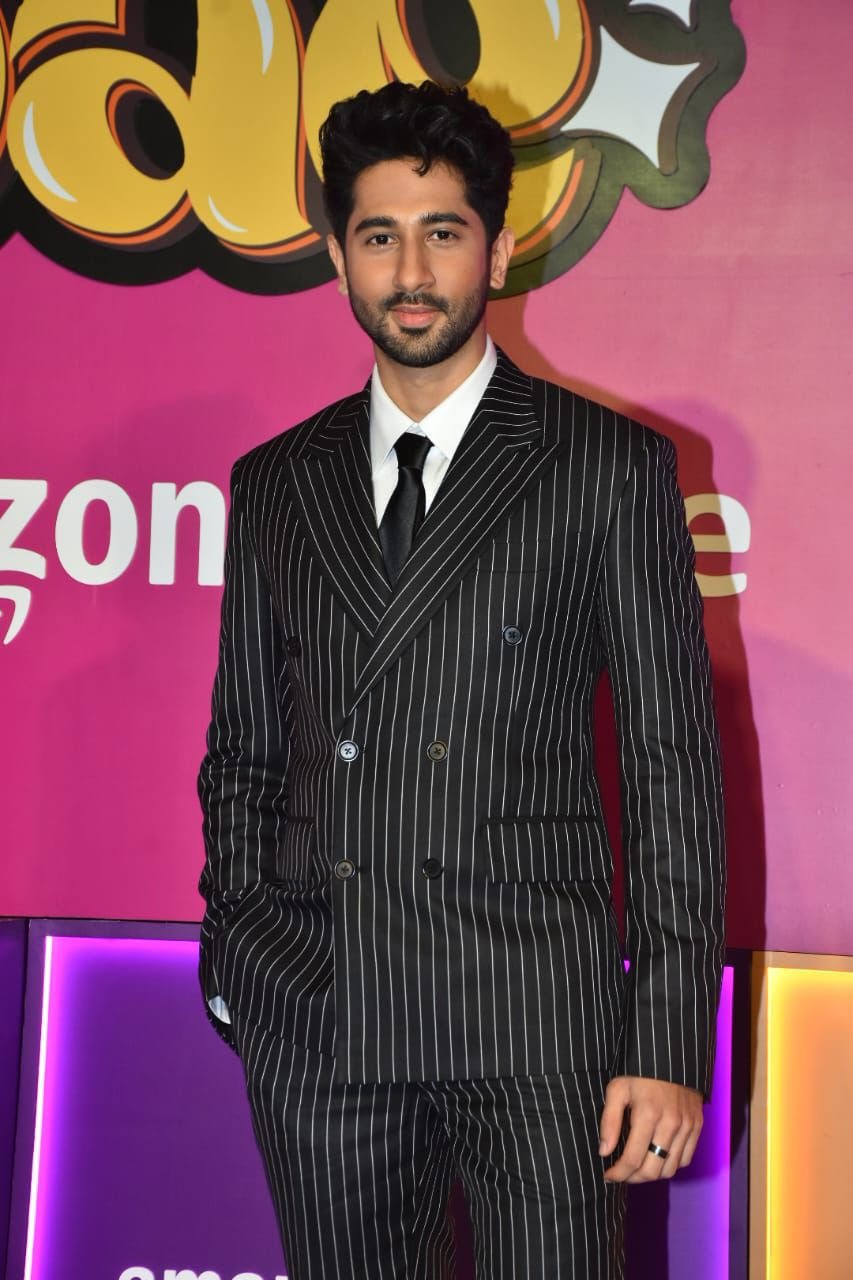
- Samat in 2024
- Born: 9 March 1996 (age 30); Calcutta, Bengal, India
- Education: Tisch School of the Arts
- Occupation: Actor
- Years active: 2020–present

Vihaan Samat (born 9 March 1996) is an Indian actor who works in Hindi-language films and series. He is best known for playing the lead part in the Netflix series Eternally Confused and Eager for Love (2022) and a supporting part in the Netflix romantic comedy series Mismatched (2020–present).

== Early life and education ==
Vihaan Samat was born into a Sindhi family on 9 March 1996 in Calcutta and raised in Mumbai, India. He attended the Arya Vidya Mandir School and the Dhirubhai Ambani International School. He graduated from the New York University's Tisch School of the Arts in 2018 after studying method acting and returned to India the following year.

== Career ==
He began his career with a supporting role in the feature film Worth starring Michael Keaton. He then essayed the role of Harsh Agarwal in the Netflix television show, Mismatched. The show was produced by RSVP. On the show, Suchin Mehrotra of Film Companion commented: "The show remains an appealing, easy watch due to its charming cast. As Harsh, Vihaan , armed with his impressive American accent is given a lot more to do this time around. And the show does well to navigate the Harsh-Dimple-Rishi love triangle with a touching sensitivity."

He then played the lead role of an anxiety-stricken young man called Ray in the Netflix series Eternally Confused and Eager for Love. The show was produced by Tiger Baby Films and directed by Rahul Nair. On his performance, Sanchita Jhunjhunwala wrote: "Vihaan as Ray puts together a great performance and you enjoy watching him take on this journey. While he does manage to make you feel sorry for him, there are times when you also find the crossroads he's at, relatable (in different ways, for different people of course). He does fit into the character pretty fine and there aren't any two ways about it, even though it was a pretty surprising cast, but well, that's where the acting stands out".

He has appeared in multiple brand endorsements like Mamaearth with Sara Ali Khan. He made his first audio debut with Audible India's Hindi adaptation of Marvel's Wastelanders as Jordan Temple, alongside Kareena Kapoor Khan as the Black Widow and Masaba Gupta as Lisa Cartwright.

He has mentioned he has an interest in working in biopics, science fiction films and investigative thrillers. He has mentioned he would like to work on "stories with a soul" and things that would last "long after I’m gone". He frequently performs theatre with Mismatched directors Akarsh Khurana and Adhaar Khurana.

In 2024, he appeared opposite Ananya Panday in the Amazon Prime Video comedy series Call Me Bae, and in Vikramaditya Motwane's cyber thriller CTRL on Netflix.

He will reportedly be seen in a web series produced by Applause Entertainment with Ileana D'Cruz.

== Filmography ==
=== Television ===
Year	Title	Role	Notes	Ref
2020–2024	Mismatched	Harsh Agarwal		
2022	Eternally Confused and Eager For Love	Ray		
2024	Call Me Bae	Agastya Choudhary		
2025	The Royals	Yuvaraj Digvijay "Diggy" Singh		
TBA	Untitled series	TBA	Filming	

=== Films ===
Year	Title	Role	Notes	Ref
2020	Worth	Patel		
2024	CTRL	Joe Mascarenhas		
