= Raavan (2010 film) =

2010 Indian film by Mani Ratnam

- Theatrical release poster
- Directed by: Mani Ratnam
- Written by: Story & Screenplay: Mani Ratnam; Dialogues: Vijay Krishna Acharya
- Produced by: Mani Ratnam; Sharada Trilok
- Starring: Abhishek Bachchan; Aishwarya Rai Bachchan; Vikram; Govinda; Nikhil Dwivedi; Ravi Kishan; Priyamani
- Cinematography: Santosh Sivan; V. Manikandan
- Edited by: A. Sreekar Prasad
- Music by: A. R. Rahman
- Production company: Madras Talkies
- Distributed by: Reliance BIG Pictures
- Release date: 17 June 2010
- Running time: 131 minutes
- Country: India
- Language: Hindi
- Budget: ₹55 crore (US$5.9 million)
- Box office: ₹49.5 crore (US$5.3 million)

Raavan is a 2010 Indian Hindi-language action-adventure film co-written and directed by Mani Ratnam, who also co-produced the film. It stars Abhishek Bachchan, Aishwarya Rai Bachchan and Vikram while Govinda, Nikhil Dwivedi, Ravi Kishan and Priyamani are in pivotal roles. It marks the Hindi film debuts of Vikram and Priyamani. The film follows the crux of the epic Ramayana, but with a modernized plot that reveals the perspective of Ravana.

Raavan was announced in February 2008, whilst Abhishek and Aishwarya's collaboration in the second time after Guru (2007), created more anticipation. Shooting began soon after, and took place in various locations with a record number of extras in areas including Chalakudy, Kerala, and Ooty, Tamil Nadu amongst other regions throughout India. The film's music was composed by A. R. Rahman, with lyrics written by Gulzar. The cinematography was handled by V. Manikandan and Santhosh Sivan, and editing is done by A. Sreekar Prasad.

The film was simultaneously released in two languages. Tamil as Raavanan with Vikram reprising Bachchan's role and playing the antagonist, Prithviraj Sukumaran reprising Vikram's role (which Abhishek Bachchan was supposed to play, but opted out of the film as he was not fluent in Tamil) and playing the protagonist, and Aishwarya Rai Bachchan reprising her role in Tamil as well.

Both versions were released simultaneously on 17 June 2010 worldwide. The film's premiere was held in London on 16 June 2010.

== Plot ==
The film opens with a coordinated ambush by a tribal insurgent leader, Beera Munda, and his gang, who lure a police convoy into a fatal trap in the rural hinterlands. Concurrently, Beera abducts Raagini Sharma, a classical dancer, during a boating excursion. Her husband, Dev Pratap Sharma, a ruthless and fiercely dedicated Superintendent of Police (SP), is immediately notified and mobilizes a massive rescue operation. While state authorities and police forces classify Beera as a dangerous Naxalite outlaw, he functions as a local folk hero, running a parallel administration with his brothers, Mangal and Hariya, to protect indigenous communities from institutional exploitation.

Beera takes Raagini to a secluded cliffside hideout, intending to execute her in retaliation for an earlier state-sanctioned atrocity. Defiant, Raagini refuses to succumb to his execution and leaps off the towering cliff into a rushing river below. She survives the fall but is recaptured. Intrigued and unsettled by her absolute lack of fear regarding mortality, Beera holds off her execution, choosing instead to keep her as a high-value hostage. Dev leads an heavily armed tactical squad into the dense, untamed jungle, enlisting the assistance of Sanjeevani Kumar, a localized forest guard familiar with the terrain.

As the pursuit deepens, Raagini is exposed to the harsh realities of the tribal conflict and begins developing Stockholm syndrome, empathizing with her captor's motivations. She discovers that Beera’s vendetta stems from an extrajudicial raid Dev led against Beera's village during the wedding of his younger sister, Jamunia. In the ensuing crossfire, Beera was shot in the neck and dragged to safety by his men, leaving the village unprotected. The police subsequently detained Jamunia, subjecting her to brutal custodial torture and sexual assault to extract Beera's coordinates. Upon his return, Beera found a deeply traumatized Jamunia, who committed suicide the following morning by drowning in a village well.

As the military blockade cuts off essential supplies, causing widespread distress among the tribal villagers, Hariya proposes a truce to Dev to prevent further bloodshed. Dev deceptively agrees to the negotiation, but when Hariya emerges from the jungle unarmed to finalize the terms, Dev executes him on the spot. Dev openly prioritizes the total annihilation of Beera's network over the safety of his wife. Dev's betrayal enrages Beera and Mangal, who launch a fierce counter-offensive that decimates the police camp. This culminates in a physical, high-stakes duel between Dev and Beera on a rickety rope bridge hanging over a deep gorge. Beera ultimately overpowers the SP, but chooses to spare his life out of respect for Raagini's honor.

Dev extricates himself and locates Raagini, whom Beera has left bound but unharmed at a designated extraction point. While traveling back to civilization, Dev's repressed anger surfaces; he aggressively accuses Raagini of infidelity, falsely claiming that Beera boasted about a sexual encounter with her. Outraged by her husband's toxic distrust and realizing the implications, a furious Raagini leaves Dev. She tracks down Mangal to arrange an immediate confrontation with Beera.

Upon meeting Beera in the jungle, she demands the truth regarding the allegation. Beera vehemently denies making the statement, and the duo instantly realizes that Dev fabricated the lie, knowing a betrayed Raagini would unwittingly lead police tracking units straight to Beera’s hidden sanctuary. Dev and a heavily armed police detail emerge from the foliage, surrounding them. Raagini desperately throws herself in front of Beera to shield him, but Beera pushes her out of the line of fire. Hit multiple times by a barrage of gunfire, Beera falls backward off the cliff to his death with a peaceful smile, leaving a devastated Raagini looking on in absolute horror.

== Cast ==
- Abhishek Bachchan as Beera Munda, a Naxalite (a character based on Ravana)
- Aishwarya Rai Bachchan as Ragini Sharma / Mahua (a character based on Sita)
- Vikram as Dev Pratap Sharma IPS, Additional Superintendent of Police (a Character based on Sri Rama)
- Govinda as Sanjeevani Kumar (a character based on Hanuman)
- Nikhil Dwivedi as DSP Hemant Sinha (a character based on Lakshmana)
- Ravi Kishan as Mangal, Beera's brother (a character based on Kumbhakarna)
- Priyamani as Jamuni, Beera's sister (a character based on Shurpanakha)
- Ajay Gehi as Hariya, Beera's younger brother (a character based on Vibhishana)
- Sachin Khedekar as Beera's father
- Pankaj Tripathi as Gulabiya, a transgender woman in the village
- Tejaswini Kolhapure as Dulari
- Anshika Srivastav as Puniya
- Faisal Rashid as Rajeshwar Tiwari aka Guddu, Jamuni's lover (a character based on Vidyutjihva)
- Chintu Mohaptra as Photographer
- Alpa Joshi as Tiwari's wife
- Mangal Kekre as Jamuni's mother (a character based on Kaikashi)
- Manoj Mishra as Ranjit, Beera's spy (a character based on Shuka and Sarana)

== Production ==
=== Development ===
During the making of his 2007 drama Guru starring Abhishek Bachchan and Aishwarya Rai Bachchan, Mani Ratnam had finalised a script for his next directorial venture titled Lajjo. Based on a short story by Ismat Chughtai, it was a musical period film set in the desert and was to star Aamir Khan and Kareena Kapoor in the lead. Though the film was slated to go on floors after the release of the former, there were reports of a fall-out between Ratnam and Khan due to creative differences. While cinematographer P. C. Sreeram denied the reports, the film's would-be lyricist Gulzar said there were actually problems with acquiring the copyright of the story, and composer A. R. Rahman even confirmed to having completed 80% of the film score. Yet, the project was put on the back burner for reasons unknown.

Following the critical and commercial success of Guru, Ratnam announced his next film in February 2008. A modern-day retelling of the mythological epic Ramayana, the film again features the real life couple in the lead. The film was initially planned to be made only in Hindi and the idea for the Tamil version came later. In January 2009, while the film was in the making, it was further decided to dub the Tamil version to Telugu making it a tri-lingual. While the film was yet to be titled, it was widely reported in the media that the Tamil version was titled Ashokavanam in reference to the place where Sita was held captive by Ravana. Subsequently, the film was titled Raavan in Hindi and Raavanan in Tamil. While the plot is inspired by Ramayana, the story is narrated from Ravana's perspective making him the protagonist. The film is centered on the 'Ashokavanam' episode where Ravana kidnaps Sita and keeps her in Asokavanam. Later Rama ventures to save his wife and bring her back.

=== Casting ===
Bachchan and Vikram were roped in for the contrasting leads. Rai plays the female lead in both versions of the film.

Manikandan was hired as the film's cinematographer; however, he walked out in May 2009 and was replaced by Santosh Sivan. The editing was done by Sreekar Prasad. Rai's costumes were exclusively designed by fashion designer Sabyasachi Mukherjee. Choreography was by Ganesh Acharya, Brinda, Shobana, and Astad Deboo. Peter Hein and Shyam Koushal choreographed the action sequences and Samir Chanda took care of production design.

=== Filming ===
Raavan was shot in numerous locations around India including the forests of Karnataka (Tumkur), Kerala (Athirappilly Falls), Ooty, Jhansi, Kolkata, Mahabaleshwar and in the Malshej Ghats in Maharashtra.

Principal photography commenced in October 2008, in the forests near Kochi, Kerala. A few scenes were filmed at Athirappilly Falls, Ratnam's favourite location. Incidentally, he has shot for the songs 'Jiya Jale' in Dil Se.. and 'Barso Re' in Guru at the same location. Forest officials banned the shooting at Malayattoor, an eco-tourism centre, for violating rules and constructing temporary huts, delaying the shoot for 11 days until the issues were resolved on 22 October 2008, while laying down reworked rules. The second leg of the shooting at Ooty that began in December 2008 was also delayed as local cab drivers protested the use of film federation (FEFSI) vehicles which affected their business, forcing a dejected Ratnam to call off the shoot temporarily and move on to Hogenakkal Falls. In February 2009, the crew advanced to Kolkata where the song 'Kalvare' was shot by the banks of Hooghly at Agarpara. Later, as the shooting resumed and progressed at Ooty, Ratnam fell ill in April 2009 and was hospitalised at Apollo Hospitals, causing a further delay of 47 days until filming resumed in June 2009 following his recovery. As the numerous delays affected his other projects, DOP Manikandan walked out in May and was replaced by Santosh Sivan. By July, the crew moved back to Kerala, to reshoot a few scenes at Chalakudy as Ratnam was reportedly unsatisfied after seeing the rushes. This time around, heavy rains played spoilsport leading to another delay in filming. Moreover, when an elephant brought for the shoot ran amok killing the mahout, the Animal Welfare Board served a show cause notice to the production company (Madras Talkies) for not taking permission to use elephants.

The film began its last schedule in August 2009 at the Malshej Ghats in Maharashtra where the climax sequence was shot, the final encounter taking place on a wooden bridge. Production designer Samir Chanda built three identical bridges to facilitate the scene to be captured from different angles. Though initially planned to be built either in Sri Lanka, Australia or South Africa, the bridge was constructed in Mumbai to reduce costs. While bad weather and heavy rains disrupted shoot for a few days, the forest department filed cases against some crew members for trespassing. The film went into post-production by the end of 2009.

Numerous action sequences were performed by the actors. The actors suffered from real cuts and bruises so they didn't need make up. The stunts were directed by Mani Ratnam and choreographed by Peter Hein, who received a Filmfare action award for the Hindi versions of Ghajini and Anniyan. For his introduction scene, the protagonist has to jump from a 90-foot high cliff near the Hogenakkal Falls into the river below. This risky dive was performed by a body double, Balram, a Bangalore based former national diving champion. Kalarippayattu, a martial art form originating from Kerala, was also featured in the film. Sunil Kumar, a Kalari gym trainer from Kozhikode, trained the actors. Dancer Astad Deboo choreographed a passionate chase scene and a tandav dance between Abhishek and Aishwarya for the film.

== Music ==
The soundtrack for the film was composed by A. R. Rahman with lyrics penned by Gulzar. It features six songs and an additional song that was performed by Rahman at the audio launch. It was released on 24 April 2010 by T-Series.

The additional track performed by Rahman, titled "Jaare Ud Jaare", was not included in the CD. The song was cited to be an "instant composition": "The night before the launch, Rahman closeted himself in his Mumbai studio and worked through the night to compose the song." This song is believed to be included in the later stages. The soundtrack also features three additional songs that were featured in the movie.

== Release ==
Raavan, along with its simultaneously made Tamil version Raavanan, was released on 18 June 2010.

== Reception ==
=== Critical response ===
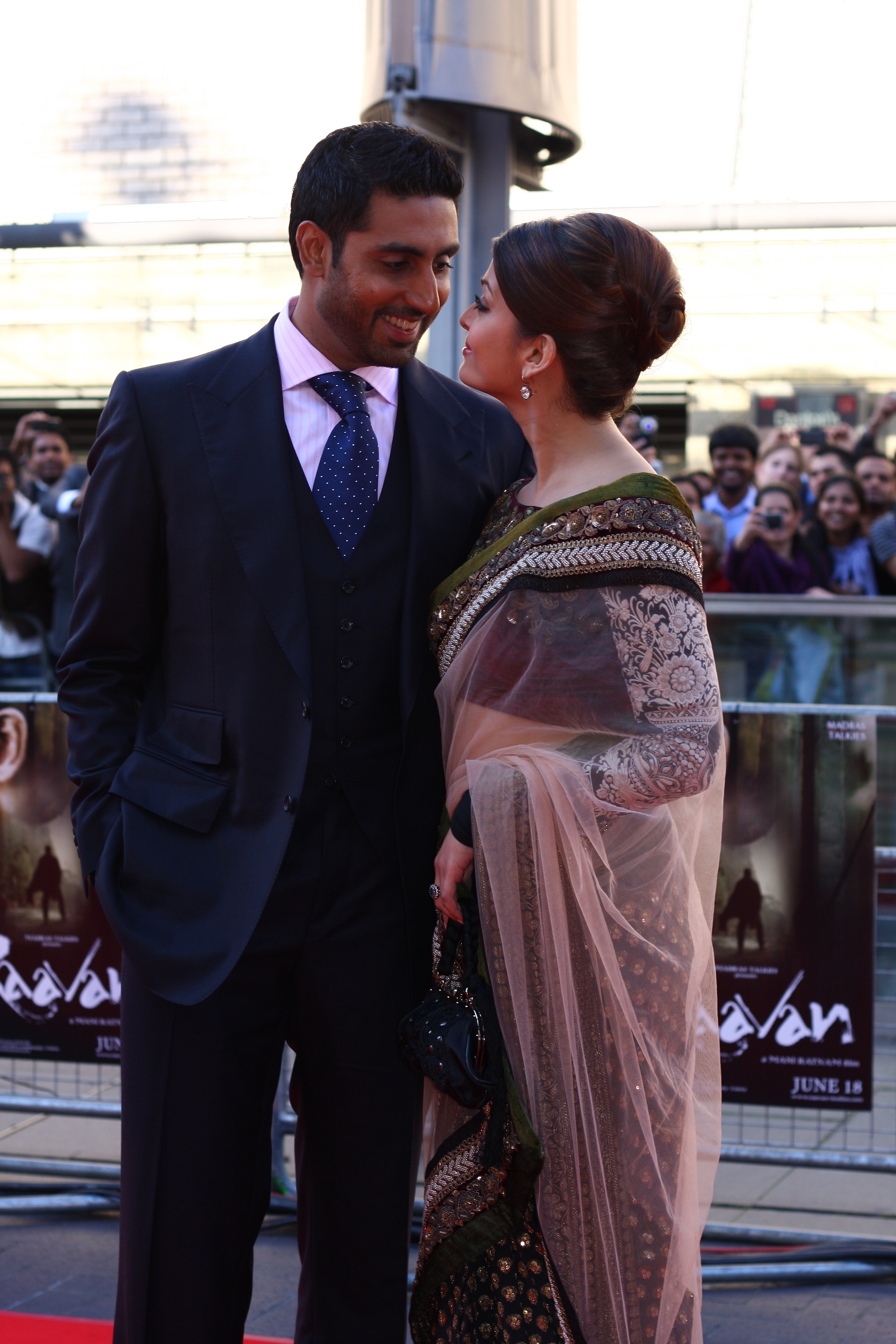
Abhishek and Aishwarya at the London premiere

Among Indian film critics, Raavan received mixed reviews and responses. Rajeev Masand of IBN gave the film 1.5/5 and said, "Despite some eye-watering camerawork and a stunning action piece in the film's climax, the film -- especially its first half -- is a carelessly edited mess of long scenes that make little sense when strung together". Noyon Jyoti Parasara of AOL rated it 2.5/5 and stated, "Raavan is more a choreographed musical-cum-psychological drama but without proper character backing. What makes the movie worth watching is the peaks in the second half, of course apart from the imagery". Taran Adarsh of Bollywood Hungama rated it 1.5/5 and said, "On the whole, Raavan is a king-sized disappointment, in terms of content". Sukanya Venkatraghavan of Filmfare rated the film 3/5 and said, "Raavan has its moments but it lacks depth. The first half is fairly riveting but the second half slowly slips into a coma". Nikhat Kazmi of The Times of India rated it favourably at 3.5/5, saying, "There are enough punches in the second half to keep the momentum going, but by and large, the film scores mostly on art and aesthete". Raja Sen of Rediff rated it 2/5 and said, "Raavan truly and tragically fails us is in taking one of our greatest epics, and making it unforgivably boring". Parimal Rohit of Buzzine Bollywood said, "Raavan is ultimately a clever film, as it pushed the envelope on how one goes about defining who is good and who is evil".

As of February 2022, Raavan holds a 46% approval rating among the audience. Cath Clarke of The Guardian gave the film a rating of 2/5 and found it sexist. However, Frank Lovece of Film Journal International found it a "cracklingly stylish, suspenseful psychological drama" with "a visual sense that evokes David Fincher at his darkest", and admired the dance numbers, "one taking place somewhat naturalistically at a wedding, the other essentially a stunning war dance".

The New York Times and the Los Angeles Times likewise gave it positive reviews: Rachel Saltz of the former made it a Times "Critic's Pick" and lauded Ratnam as "a talented visual storyteller who directs action crisply and fills the screen with striking images" including "an eye-popping climactic battle", while Kevin Thomas of the latter said the film "is replete with dizzying camerawork, myriad complications, violent mayhem, broad humor, [the] usual musical interludes, a cliffhanging climactic confrontation and a finish that strikes a note of poignancy".

=== Box office ===
Raavan opened "below expectations" at the Indian box office, with the Hindi version earning Rs 60.1 million on its opening day. In North America, Raavan opened in 120 theaters and ranked No. 15 on the domestic weekend box office chart with $760. Box Office India declared the film a Flop.

Unlike its Hindi counterpart, which tanked at the box office, the Tamil version tasted success in the South. During its opening weekend on 15 screens in Chennai, it was the number one film and netted ₹9 million (US$96,000), an opening weekend record then. Though the film opened to packed houses, it slumped a little due to mixed reviews but later picked up following a local holiday. The film collected $8 million at the box office in the first month of release including $400,000 from Kerala. It went on to make over ₹ 600 million at the worldwide box office and remained one of the top Tamil grossers of the year. Uk opening weekend. UK boxoffice second week. New York boxoffice.

=== Accolades ===
6th Apsara Film & Television Producers Guild Awards

Won

- Apsara Award for Best Cinematography – V. Manikandan (shared with Guzaarish)
- Apsara Award for Best Re-recording – Tapan Nayak
- Apsara Award for Best Visual Credits – Srinivas Karthik Kotamraju
- Apsara Award for Best cinematography – Santosh Sivan

Nominated

- Apsara Award for Best Performance in a Supporting Role (Female) – Priya Mani

2011 Zee Cine Awards

Nominated

- Best Actor in a Negative Role – Abhishek Bachchan

3rd Mirchi Music Awards

Nominated

- Upcoming Male Vocalist of The Year – Mustafa Kutoane and Kirti Sagathia – "Beera"
- Song representing Sufi tradition – "Ranjha Ranjha"
- Best Programmer & Arranger of the Year – A. R. Rahman – "Ranjha Ranjha"
- Best Background Score of the Year – A. R. Rahman

Stardust Awards

Nominated

- Nominated – Stardust Awards for Best Supporting Actor – Govinda
