= My Name Is Anthony Gonsalves (film) =

2008 Indian film directed by Eeshwar Nivas

- Theatrical release poster
- Directed by: Eeshwar Nivas
- Written by: Dialogue: Mayur Puri
- Screenplay by: Mayur Puri; Lajan Joseph
- Starring: Nikhil Dwivedi; Amrita Rao; Mithun Chakraborty
- Cinematography: Prakash Kutty
- Edited by: Rameshwar S. Bhagat
- Music by: Pritam; Himesh Reshammiya
- Production companies: Sahara One Motion Pictures e.niwas Productions
- Distributed by: Sahara One
- Release date: 11 January 2008
- Running time: 136 minutes
- Country: India
- Language: Hindi

My Name Is Anthony Gonsalves is a 2008 Indian Hindi-language crime drama film directed by Eeshwar Nivas and starring newcomer Nikhil Dwivedi, Amrita Rao and Mithun Chakraborty as the lead protagonists. The name of this film is derived from superstars Amitabh Bachchan, Vinod Khanna, and Rishi Kapoor's successful film Amar Akbar Anthony's famous song, "My Name Is Anthony Gonsalves". It was released on 11 January 2008 and was a box office bomb.

== Plot ==
My Name Is Anthony Gonsalves starts with a gangster and killer, Sikander, murdering someone with his gang; they bury him and flee. Then the storyline drops to a young man, Anthony Gonsalves, who accepts Sikander as his father and guru since Sikander takes Anthony in when he was a young child living on the streets. He doesn't adopt him, though, since he says that his real father is the town priest.

Anthony wants to become a famous, wealthy actor and to be as kind as Sikander, unaware that Sikander is a murderer. Sikander has kept this from him because he wants Anthony to grow up to be a decent man, unlike himself. Anthony also hopes to live among high society and to meet his idols.

One day, when Anthony is practicing film dialogues with a couple of street gangsters, he meets Riya, a woman who is an orphan and lives a middle-class lifestyle in Mumbai. She works as an assistant director for a movie producer, Bharucha. Anthony introduces himself as the son of Jeffrey, who died in 1986 and works as a waiter in Jimmy's Pub, Bandra. She meets him again in the studios when he comes to audition for the part of Mark Anthony in a remake of Shakespeare's Julius Caesar. Both are attracted to each other and continue to meet. Little does Riya know that Anthony has lied to her, as he never had a father by the name of Jeffrey. When he gets the role of Mark Anthony, he goes to tell Sikander, and he sees him murdering a person. Anthony now knows the true side of Sikander.

Anthony doesn't tell them, but somehow, police inspector Khan finds out and goes to alert Sikander, for which he needs the help of Anthony. He gets Anthony on his side, but Anthony is a man of his word and blames all the murders on Sikander's boss. To make it look real, Anthony does fake stunts, like blowing Murtaza's factory up and acting dead. In the climax, Anthony, Sikander, and the priest who raised Anthony get together to kill Sikander's boss; that's when the police enter. Sikander gets arrested. Anthony marries Riya and becomes a big hero, a superstar, and his dreams come true.

== Cast ==
- Nikhil Dwivedi as Anthony Gonsalves
- Amrita Rao as Riya Singh
- Mithun Chakraborty as Priest Braganza
- Pawan Malhotra as Sikander Bhai
- Anupam Kher as Murtaza Seth
- Mukesh Tiwari as Maqsood Ahmed
- Lillete Dubey as Ms. Bharucha
- Jawed Sheikh as Inspector Amjad Khan
- D. Santosh as Michael Raja
- Sachin Nayak as Casting Director (in film)
- Vishal O Sharma as Shiraj Bhai
- Anil Kapoor as himself (guest appearance)
- Priyanka Chopra as herself (guest appearance)
- Hrishita Bhatt as item number in the song "Ya Baba" (special appearance)

== Soundtrack ==
My Name Is Anthony Gonsalves

Soundtrack album by Pritam Chakraborty and Himesh Reshammiya
- Released: 20 December 2007
- Recorded: 2007
- Genre: Feature film soundtrack
- Length: 30:43
- Language: Hindi
- Label: T-Series

Pritam Chakraborty chronology
Dhan Dhana Dhan Goal (2007)	My Name Is Anthony Gonsalves (2007)	Bombay to Bangkok (2008)

Himesh Reshammiya chronology
Welcome (2007)	My Name Is Anthony Gonsalves (2008)	Dasavtharam (2008)

The soundtrack of the film is composed by Pritam Chakraborty and Himesh Reshammiya while the lyrics are penned by Sameer.

=== Track list ===
Track #	Song	Artist(s)
1	"Allah Beley"	KK
2	"Jaane Maula Jaane Khuda" (another version by Remo Fernandes)	Amit Kumar
3	"Tum Mile" (music by: Himesh Reshammiya)	Sunidhi Chauhan, KK
4	"Tere Bina"	Sunidhi Chauhan
5	"Ya Baba"	Sunidhi Chauhan, Shaan
6	"Tum Mile Remix" (music by: Himesh Reshammiya)	KK, Sunidhi Chauhan (Remixed By: Abhijit Vagani)
7	"Ya Baba Remix"	Sunidhi Chauhan (Remixed By: Joshilay)
