= Shrimad Bhagwat Mahapuran =

Indian mythological television series

- Genre: Mythological; Drama
- Created by: Nikhil Dwivedi
- Based on: Bhagavata Purana; Bhagavad Gita; Mahabharata; Ramayana
- Developed by: Vikas Kapoor
- Written by: Vikas Kapoor
- Directed by: Kamal Monga
- Starring: See below
- Opening theme: Shirmad Bhagwat – song
- Ending theme: Shrimad Bhagwat – music
- Country of origin: India
- Original language: Hindi
- No. of seasons: 1
- No. of episodes: 52

Production
- Producer: Nikhil Dwivedi
- Editor: Paresh Shah
- Camera setup: multi-camera
- Running time: 43 minutes
- Production company: Saffron Productions

Original release
- Network: Colors TV
- Release: 2 June 2019 – 24 May 2020

Shrimad Bhagwat Mahapuran is an Indian mythological television series produced by Nikhil Dwivedi. Series aired on Colors TV from 2 June 2019 to 24 May 2020.

== Plot ==
Krishna answers Radha's questions and tells tales from Srimad Bhagavatam in no particular order.

== Cast ==
- Shiny Doshi as Radha
- Rajneesh Duggal as Krishna
- Shalini Vishnudev as Yashoda
- Sushant Marya as Balaram
- Ishita Ganguly as Parvati
- Indraneil Sengupta as Shiva
- Vidisha Srivastav as Sita
- Aishwarya Sharma as Sita
- Waseem Mushtaq as Rama
- Alihassan Turabi as Ravana
- Aashish Kaul as Prahlada
- Hrishikesh Pandey as Daksha
- Rahul Ranaa as Ahiravan
- Harsh Vashisht as Parikshit
- Riyanka Chanda as Uttarāa
- Kajal Jain as Shurpanakha
- Kunal Bakshi as Ravana
- Ketaki Kadam as Gayatri
- Ketan Karande as Vali/Sugriva
- Ayaan Zubair Rahamani as Child Krishna
- Dinesh Mehta as Shantanu
- Monica Sharma as Devi Ganga
- Meet Mukhi as Young Prahlada
- Vandana Lalwani as Gandhari
- Ayaz Khan as Devraj Indra
- Amit Varma as Viprachitti
- Vijay Badlani as Devrishi Narada
- Amit Pachori as Bhagwan Vishnu
- Smriti Khanna as Iravati
- Garima Jain as Shachi
- Nazea Hasan Sayed as Tulsi
- Iti Kaurav as Maya
- Shailesh Gulabani as Satyavrata
- Nidhi Seth as Vedavati
- Danish Akhtar Saifi as Hanuman
- Priyom Gujjar as Lakshman
- Meer Ali as Young Bhishma
- Viraj Kapoor as Young Krishna
- Aryavart Mishra as Young Ganesh
- Arun Mandola as Vibhishan
- Chandan Madan as Surya

== Episodes ==
Episode No.	Telecast Date	Title
1.	2 Jun 2019	Parvati created Ganesha, his beheading by his father & why his father had to behead him.
2.	9 Jun 2019	Ganesha received elephant head & the cut-off head asks justice.
3.	16 Jun 2019	Was Lord Rama's action justified?
4.	23 Jun 2019	A story of true love and sorrow!
5.	30 Jun 2019	Shiva's journey of sacrifices!
6.	7 Jul 2019	The tragic story of Ved Vyasa
7.	14 Jul 2019	The tale of Maharaj Kaliyug
8.	21 Jul 2019	Kaliyug conspires against Parikshit
9.	28 Jul 2019	The tale of Raavan and Dasharatha
10.	4 Aug 2019	King Parikshit cursed to be killed by snake Takshaka who has his own motive for killing him.
11.	11 Aug 2019	Parikshit listens to Srimad Bhagavat from Shukadeva & dies in peace. His son Janamejaya starts snake sacrifice.
12.	18 Aug 2019	Hayaasura (horse-faced demon) steals Vedas (source of all knowledge), God decides end of world, chooses Satyavrata to be 1st man in new age & takes matsya avatar ( the giant fish incarnation).
13.	25 Aug 2019	Great flood, the giant fish brings Satyavrata, his wife & Saptarishis(7 celestial sages )to safety, God takes Hayagriva avatar(the horse-man incarnation) to kill The Demon.
14.	1 Sep 2019	God kills Bhrigu's wife whose Sage Bhrigu curses him then repents & whose son, Shukra, is punished for his impudence but decides revenge.
15.	8 Sep 2019	Shukra's revenge & Indra, leader of demigods, cursed.
16.	15 Sep 2019	God defeats serpent Kaliya & dispute between Action & Destiny.
17.	22 Sep 2019	Witch Putana is blessed even though she tries to kill God, Putana's previous life where she accepts God as his son then wants to kill him when God take Vamana avatar(the fifth incarnation) assumes gigantic form & takes over Earth, Heaven & her father Bali.
18.	29 Sep 2019	Justice council is set up where Ganesha punishes God to go with Bali, God's wife gets her husband back.
19.	6 Oct 2019	Demon Hiranyakashyapa creates havoc, tries to kill his son, Prahlad, who is God's devotee but is killed by God's fourth incarnation of Narasimha(lion-man).
20.	13 Oct 2019	Indra attacks Hiranyakashyap's kingdom while he's away, Narada makes Prahalad devotee, Prahlad's previous life, his desire to avenge his father.
21.	20 Oct 2019	Ganesha & Tulsi curse each other, Parvati bring a way for God's prasada to reach people.
22.	27 Oct 2019	Markandeya conquers death.
23.	3 Nov 2019	Parvati proves one can change one's original skin tone & accepts Dhanua's lion, becoming known as Dawon (goddess whose mount is lion).
24.	10 Nov 2019	Narad becomes arrogant & thinks himself as mighty as the Trinity, curses Vishnu & Laxmi.
25.	17 Nov 2019	Laxmi curses Narad who is cursed by Brahma in his next life. In the life after this, Narad becomes good person.
26.	24 Nov 2019	Daksha, an arrogant king, curses Narad.
27.	1 Dec 2019	Daksha wants devotion to God to stop, is taught a lesson by Marichi (elder brother), The Moon's wives try to kill his favourite wife, Daksha curses Lord Chandra (Moon).
28.	8 Dec 2019	Daksha insults Shiva upon which Sati sets fire to herself. Angry Shiva calls upon Veerbhadra & Bhadrakali.
29.	15 Dec 2019	Why Vishnu fails to protect Dakha's sacrifice hall, Veerbhadra plucks off Daksha's head to be replaced with goat's head.
30.	22 Dec 2019	Goddess Gayatri
31.	29 Dec 2019	Sage Richik learns his mother's wish
32.	5 Jan 2020	The birth of the devious Ravan
33.	12 Jan 2020	Shurpanakha, the downfall of Ravan
34.	19 Jan 2020	The tale of Ravan's treachery!
35.	26 Jan 2020	Ravan's encounter with Kailash!
36.	2 Feb 2020	Shabari's life of devotion
37.	9 Feb 2020	Ravan to Ram's aid
38.	16 Feb 2020	Kumbhakarna's invincible legacy
39.	23 Feb 2020	Ravan plans to avenge Indrajit!
40.	1 Mar 2020	Ravan feels insulted by Vedavati!
41.	8 mar 2020	Lakshman learns from Ravan!
42.	15 mar 2020	Ram vows to destroy Kashiraj!
43.	22 mar 2020	Kaikeyi demands Ram's exile!
44.	29 mar 2020	Sita's divine sacrifice
45.	5 April 2020	Battle of the Gods!
46.	12 April 2020	Ganga and her seven sons
47.	19 April 2020	Devavrat's ultimate sacrifice!
48.	26 April 2020	The curse on Kashyapa!
49.	3 May 2020	A tale of Devaki's woes
50.	10 May 2020	Story of the warrior prince Balaram!
51.	17 May2020	Dhritarashtra questions Kanha
52.	24 May 2020	The end of the Yadav clan
