= Veere Di Wedding =

2018 Indian film by Shashanka Ghosh

- Theatrical release poster
- Directed by: Shashanka Ghosh
- Written by: Nidhi Mehra; Mehul Suri
- Produced by: Anil Kapoor; Rhea Kapoor; Nikhil Dwivedi; Ekta Kapoor; Shobha Kapoor
- Starring: Kareena Kapoor Khan; Sonam Kapoor; Swara Bhasker; Shikha Talsania
- Cinematography: Sudhakar Reddy Yakkanti
- Edited by: Shweta Venkat Matthew
- Music by: Songs: Shashwat Sachdev; White Noise; Vishal Mishra; QARAN; Score: Arijit Dutta
- Production companies: Balaji Motion Pictures; Anil Kapoor Films & Communication Network; Saffron Broadcast & Media
- Distributed by: Zee Studios
- Release date: 1 June 2018; (India)
- Running time: 130 minutes
- Country: India
- Language: Hindi
- Budget: ₹42 crore
- Box office: ₹139 crore

Veere Di Wedding (transl. Brother's wedding) is a 2018 Indian Hindi-language female buddy comedy film directed by Shashanka Ghosh and produced by Rhea Kapoor, Ekta Kapoor and Nikhil Dwivedi. The film stars Kareena Kapoor Khan, Sonam Kapoor, Swara Bhaskar and Shikha Talsania in lead roles as four friends attending a wedding, with Sumeet Vyas, Vishwas Kini, Neena Gupta and others in supporting roles.

Veere Di Wedding was released theatrically on 1 June 2018 and generally panned by critics. Made on a budget of ₹28,000,000 (equivalent to ₹37,459,546 in 2023), the film earned over ₹139,000,000 (equivalent to ₹185,959,888 in 2023) worldwide to emerge as the fifth highest grossing Hindi film of the year, and the highest for a film featuring female leads. It received three Nominations at the 64th Filmfare Awards including Best Supporting Actress for Talsania and Bhaskar.

== Plot ==
The story is about four friends, all young women, who are facing issues with relationships, both familial and sexual.

Kalindi has been living with her boyfriend, Rishabh, for two years in Australia, but she has a phobia about marriage and professes theoretical opposition to the idea of marriage. Her parents used to fight a lot, and her father, Kishan, remarried soon after her mother's death. When Rishabh proposes to her, Kalindi is taken aback, but then agrees to the marriage for Rishabh's happiness. Avni is a practising lawyer in Delhi whose specialization is divorce cases. Her mother is looking for a suitable groom for her, but Avni's daily professional experience makes her very nervous about marriage. Sakshi is already married but is living with her parents after moving out of her husband's home. The reasons for her break up with her husband are not known at this point. Meera has married an American, John, with whom she has a son named Kabir. Her father, also named Kabir, was intensely opposed to the marriage for cultural reasons. Meera is still estranged from her father, and though she misses him, she refuses to meet him until he accepts John and her son.

Kalindi travels to Delhi to get married, and stays with her uncle Kuki and his partner for these few weeks. Kishan and his current wife, Paromita, offer to help Kalindi in her wedding, though she remains disinterested. Kalindi is overwhelmed by Rishabh's affectionate, wholesome family and their deep, supportive involvement with each other. She is disturbed by the fact that they place way too much importance on the religious ceremonies connected to a Hindu wedding and on the significance of each ritual. She finds this cloying and thinks they will expect a lot from her after marriage, as she has always cherished her independence and individualism. Rishabh's family are surprised at the fact that Kalindi hardly seems to have any family, that she is even estranged from Kishan, and that the rather weird Kuki is unmarried and has a live-in partner.

All three of Kalindi's friends attend the engagement ceremony, which turns into a fiasco. Avni gets drunk and ends up sleeping with Rishabh's cousin Bhandari, who is a perfect stranger to her; they are caught. Sakshi, distraught at the gossipy women's jibes, leaves the party midway, Meera is questioned about her family's religious inclinations. Rishabh, too, ends up commenting on Kalindi not having "proper" family and friends. This infuriates her, and she leaves her own engagement party.

The next morning, Avni, Sakshi, and Meera find Kalindi in her old home, where she grew up. Rishabh apologizes to Kalindi, and they patch up. Kalindi tells him that she would be unable to live up to his family's expectations, and they amicably break off the engagement. Unhappy about it, Avni, Sakshi and Meera try to reason with her. Kalindi points out each of her friend's flaws instead, resulting in an argument.

Sakshi, believing they have become too overwhelmed with troubles, buys her friends a vacation to Thailand. They reconnect and come clean about their respective issues: Kalindi about her commitment issues, Avni about wanting to marry the right guy, and Sakshi about why her husband wants to divorce her. One day, he walked into their bedroom and found her masturbating with a vibrator; appalled, he decided to divorce her. Sakshi is embarrassed to tell her parents the truth. Meera explains that she and John haven't had sex in a year after her son's birth. Everyone decides to go back and face their problems.

The friends are recharged this way and resolve to get their families and boyfriends to either go their way or just go away. Sakshi tells her parents about the vibrator and her husband not understanding her need for it. They decide to support her in securing a divorce, of course with large alimony. Meera phones John and they make up. John calls Kabir Sr. and tells him about Kabir Jr.; he then flies down to India to meet everyone and take his wife and child back with him. Avni tells her mother about her reluctance to settle. She cheekily promises to keep her mother informed about her adventures as she tries out various hookups before making her decision. Kalindi's friends pressurize Kuki to resolve his feud with Kishan, which is both about property and lifestyle. Eventually, the brothers talk and resolve their issues, and as neither of them has other heirs, they accept the suggestion of transferring the family house to Kalindi. Sakshi breaks the news of her generous divorce settlement to the gossipy women. Avni finds that Bhandari is interested in her, and decides to give him a chance.

== Cast ==
- Kareena Kapoor Khan as Kalindi Puri
  - Smriti Setya as Young Kalindi
- Sonam Kapoor as Advocate Avni Sharma
  - Muskaan Khubchandani as Young Avni
- Swara Bhaskar as Sakshi Soni
  - Muskaan Malhotra as Young Sakshi
- Shikha Talsania as Meera Kaur Sood Stinson
  - Kashish Kanwar as Young Meera
- Sumeet Vyas as Rishabh Malhotra,
- Vishwas Kini as Bhandari, Avni's lover
- Neena Gupta as Kavita Sharma, Avni's mother
- Kavita Ghai as Ritu Puri, Kalindi's mother
- Vivek Mushran as Kshitij "Kuki" Puri, Kalindi's uncle
- Ayesha Raza Mishra as Mrs. Malhotra, Rishabh's mother
- Manoj Pahwa as Mr. Malhotra, Rishabh's father
- Alka Kaushal as Santosh, Bhandari's mother
- Anjum Rajabali as Kishan Puri, Kalindi's father
- Ekavali Khanna as Paromita Puri, Kalindi's stepmother
- Sukesh Arora as Keshav, Kuki's boyfriend
- Edward Sonnenblick as John Stinson, Meera's husband
- Ishwak Singh as Nirmal Sharma, Avni's former suitor
- Suraj Singh as Vineet, Sakshi's ex-husband
- Kamlesh Gill as Jhaaiji
- Bubbles Sabharwal as Sakshi's mother
- Babla Kochar as Sakshi's father
- Kalpana Jha as Shanti, Avni's maid
- Jitpreet Singh Gill as Kabir Singh Sood, Meera's father

== Production ==
=== Development ===
In December 2015, Sonam Kapoor indicated that she would be working on a project with her sister Rhea Kapoor. The project was officially announced in June 2016.

The project was delayed due to Kareena Kapoor Khan's pregnancy. Principal photography began in September 2017. Swara Bhaskar, Kareena Kapoor Khan and Shikha Talsania agreed to act in the film. Pakistani actor Danish Taimoor was initially cast as Rishabh opposite Kareena Kapoor Khan with dates finalised for filming; however delays due to Kapoor Khan's pregnancy and rising tensions between India and Pakistan caused him to pull out of the film. Sumeet Vyas replaced him.

The film was shot in Delhi, Mumbai and Bangkok. The project underwent three major schedules in Delhi, Mumbai and Phuket.

The trailer was released on 25 April 2018. The first song from the film, "Tareefan", was released on 2 May.

=== Controversies ===
Another Hindi film with a similar title Veerey Ki Wedding, starring Pulkit Samrat, Kriti Kharbanda and Jimmy Shergill appeared while the movie was in production. Legal action brought by father-daughter duo Anil Kapoor and Rhea Kapoor to challenge the use of such a similar name was unsuccessful.

The film was banned by the Central Board of Film Censors in Pakistan and not screened in Kuwait for its explicit language and sexuality. When asked about the ban in Pakistan, Swara Bhaskar responded that it's evident that it would be banned in a non-secular nation states run by sharia law, like Pakistan and further elaborated that the people of Pakistan would in fact watch the movie citing tweets from them.

Swara Bhaskar lashed out at trolls who brought up her masturbation scene from Veere Di Wedding, when they put up election placards during the fourth phase of 2019 Indian general election, attempting to shame her.

== Soundtrack ==
Veere Di Wedding

Soundtrack album by Shashwat Sachdev, White Noise, Vishal Mishra and Qaran
- Released: 8 May 2018
- Recorded: 2017–2018
- Genre: Feature film soundtrack
- Length: 30:10
- Language: Hindi
- Label: Zee Music Company
External audio
- Official Audio Jukebox on YouTube

Shashwat Sachdev chronology
Kaalakaandi (2018)	Veere Di Wedding (2018)	Uri: The Surgical Strike (2019)

Vishal Mishra chronology
Qarib Qarib Single (2017)	Veere Di Wedding (2018)	Race 3 (2018)

White Noise chronology
Veere Di Wedding (2018)	Luka Chuppi (2019)

The music of the film is composed by Shashwat Sachdev, Vishal Mishra and White Noise while the lyrics are penned by Anvita Dutt Guptan, Raj Shekhar, Qaran, Rupin Pahwa, White Noise, Shashwat Sachdev, Badshah, Shellee and Gaurav Solanki. The first song of the film, Tareefan which is sung by Badshah was released on 2 May 2018. The soundtrack was released by Zee Music Company on 8 May 2018.

Track listing
No.	Title	Lyrics	Music	Singer(s)	Length
1.	"Pappi Le Loon"	Shellee	Shashwat Sachdev	Sunidhi Chauhan; Shashwat Sachdev	2:53
2.	"Bhangra Ta Sajda" (No One Gives A Damn!)	Gaurav Solanki	Shashwat Sachdev	Neha Kakkar Singh; Romy; Shashwat Sachdev	3:46
3.	"Laaj Sharam"	White Noise	White Noise	Divya Kumar; Jasleen Royal; Enbee	3:21
4.	"Veere"	Anvita Dutt Guptan	Vishal Mishra	Vishal Mishra; Aditi Singh Sharma; Dhvani Bhanushali; Nikita Ahuja; Payal Dev; Iulia Vantur; Sharvi Yadav	4:27
5.	"Bass Gira De Raja"	Shashwat Sachdev	Shashwat Sachdev	Shashwat Sachdev	3:32
6.	"Suicide Kargi Re"	Raj Shekhar	Shashwat Sachdev	Yo Yo Honey Singh; Guru Randhawa; Shilpa Rao	4:59
7.	"Dagmag Dagmag"	Anvita Dutt Guptan	Vishal Mishra	Vishal Mishra; Payal Dev	4:06
8.	"Tareefan"	Qaran; Rupin Pahwa; Badshah	Qaran	Badshah	3:06
Total length:					30:10

== Reception ==
=== Box office ===
Veere Di Wedding had net earnings of ₹107 million (equivalent to ₹140 million or US$1.5 million in 2023) on its first day in India, setting the record for the highest opening day collection for a Hindi film with female protagonist(s).

=== Critical response ===
Several critics noted the film's similarities to the television series Sex and the City. (Note: Attributed to multiple references:) Comparisons were also drawn with the comedy Bridesmaids (2011), Bachelorette (2012) and the Indian television miniseries The Trip (2016). On the review aggregator website Rotten Tomatoes, 53% of 15 critics' reviews are positive, with an average rating of 5.5/10.

==== India ====
Rachit Gupta of The Times of India gave the film a 1.5 (out of 5) rating, calling it a "weak effort." He criticized the concept of the film, the performances and the chemistry between the leads, and the pace and felt that the story lacked depth. A reviewer for Bollywood Hungama giving a similar rating and review to the film commented that "Veere Di Wedding rests on a great idea but weak characters. It doesn’t translate into a fully entertaining fare. It’s the acting that plays spoilsport." Sweta Kaushal of Hindustan Times gave the film 2/5 stars and said it "tries to subvert the male dominant stereotype but these moments are so few and far between that you almost miss the point."

Devesh Sharma of Filmfare rated it 1.5 (out of 5 stars) and opined that the film's greatest drawback was the weak chemistry between the leads and the poor acting: "that beneath all the cuss words and the sex jokes you get a whiff of laziness." Alludingly, Chaya Unnakrishnan (writing for Daily News and Analysis) felt that the chemistry between the leads seemed forced at times. She rated the film 1 (out of 5) stars and insisted that it should not be watched as one that dealt with women empowerment. Raja Sen, writing for NDTV, in a 1.5/5 rating, noted that the film "lands no blows to the patriarchy while giving up its masala entertainer roots."

Saibal Chatterjee, also from NDTV, however, was critical of the screenplay and the predictability of the plot, and wrote that it was watchable "because of the lively performances from the four actresses." He gave the film 1/5 stars. Rajeev Masand, writing for News18, criticized the film along the same lines, and added that it was "largely contrived and forgettable." On the other hand, Shubhra Gupta of The Indian Express rated the film 3/5 stars, and remarked that it "is a fun ride, which squeezes past its creaky tropes and partial squelchiness by some smart casting choices, and perky performances."

Rohit Bhatnagar of Deccan Chronicle rated the film 1.5 (out of 5) stars and thought that it was "an boring, annoying, can be skipped watch." Meanwhile, Kunal Guha of Mumbai Mirror concluded that "while this one works as a breezy film on girl bonding, it gets a bit tedious while taking a stab at patriarchy" and stated "it almost seems like old wine in a new bottle." He gave the film 3 stars (out of 5). Writing for Firstpost, Anna M.M. Vetticad described Veere Di Wedding as "an unapologetic commentary on the lives of women"; Pradeep Menon (also of Firstpost) in a less favorable review largely credited Kapoor Khan for "effortlessly anchor[ing] this flawed but fun film." Baradwaj Rangan, in a mixed review, called Veere Di Wedding "a plasticky but passable entertainer whose existence may not be the worst thing in the world."

==== Overseas ====
Saeed Saeed of The National awarded the film 1 stars out of 5 and described it as “a boring, feisty and slightly ribald comedy but with a weak heart lurking not far beneath.” Manjusha Radhakrishnan of Gulf News rated the film 1 (out of 5) stars. She was appreciative of Swara Bhaskar's performance and remarked that “Veere Di Wedding will go down as a toxic film that hurts the eye.” Shilpa Jamkhandikar of Reuters negatively stated “In terms of humor, “Veere Di Wedding” works well, but it stutters when it comes to the emotional conflicts, which feel unreal, boring and contrived.”

A particular scene in which Bhasker's character masturbates using a sex toy received a polarized response on social media. However, it was critically praised for its realistic portrayal of female sexuality.

== Awards and nominations ==
Date of ceremony	Awards	Category	Recipient(s) and nominee(s)	Result	Ref.
16 December 2018	Screen Awards	Best Actress in Supporting Role	Swara Bhaskar	Nominated	
16 December 2018	Screen Awards	Best Music		Nominated	
16 February 2019	Mirchi Music Awards	Song of The Year	"Tareefan"	Nominated	
16 February 2019	Mirchi Music Awards	Upcoming Music Composer of The Year	Qaran - "Tareefan"	Nominated	
16 February 2019	Mirchi Music Awards	Listeners' Choice Song of the Year	"Tareefan"	Nominated	
19 March 2019	Zee Cine Awards	Best Actress in Supporting Role	Shikha Talsania	Nominated	
19 March 2019	Zee Cine Awards	Best Choreography	Farah Khan - Tareefan	Nominated	
19 March 2019	Zee Cine Awards	Best Actor - Female	Kareena Kapoor Khan	Nominated	
19 March 2019	Zee Cine Awards	Best Actor - Female	Sonam Kapoor	Nominated	
19 March 2019	Zee Cine Awards	Song of the Year	Tareefan	Nominated	
23 March 2019	Filmfare Awards	Best Actress in Supporting Role	Swara Bhaskar	Nominated	
23 March 2019	Filmfare Awards	Best Actress in Supporting Role	Shikha Talsania	Nominated	
23 March 2019	Filmfare Awards	Best Playback Singer - Male	Badshah - Tareefan	Nominated	

== Sequel ==
Veere Di Wedding 2, is currently on hold due to the COVID-19 pandemic.
