= Rhea Kapoor =

Indian film producer (born 1987)

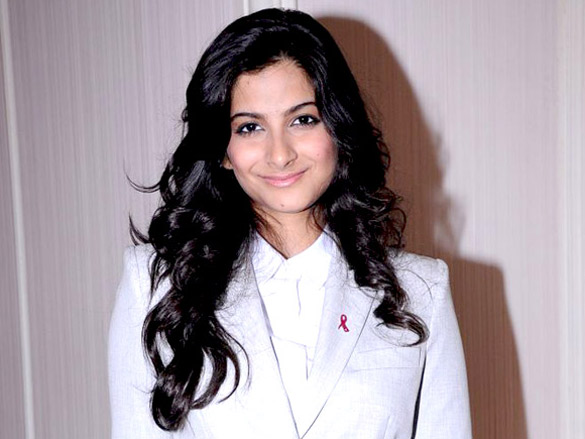
- Kapoor at Elle breast cancer carnival
- Born: 5 March 1987 (age 39); Bombay, Maharashtra, India
- Education: New York University
- Occupation: Film producer
- Years active: 2010–present
- Spouse: Karan Boolani (m. 2021)
- Parent: Anil Kapoor (father)
- Family: Surinder Kapoor family

Rhea Kapoor (born 5 March 1987) is an Indian film producer. She is also the owner of the fashion line Rheson alongside her sister Sonam Kapoor.

== Early and personal life ==
Kapoor is the daughter of actor Anil Kapoor and his wife Sunita, she is the sister of actors Sonam Kapoor and Harshvardhan Kapoor, granddaughter of filmmaker Surinder Kapoor, niece of filmmaker Boney Kapoor and his wives, the late producer Mona Shourie Kapoor and the late actress Sridevi, and actor Sanjay Kapoor. Her cousins are actors Arjun Kapoor, Janhvi Kapoor, Khushi Kapoor and Mohit Marwah as well as actor Ranveer Singh. Kapoor pursued her graduation in "Dramatic literature" from New York University

Kapoor married her partner of 12 years, Karan Boolani, in an intimate wedding at her family's residence on 14 August 2021.

== Career ==
Kapoor started her career as a film producer with Rajshree Ojha's film Aisha in 2010, which starred her sister Sonam Kapoor and Abhay Deol in leading roles. She later produced the 2014 film Khoobsurat, directed by Shashanka Ghosh, which is an official remake of Hrishikesh Mukherjee directed film by the same name. In 2017, she launched the clothing line of Rheson with her sister Sonam Kapoor.

Kapoor has co-produced Veere Di Wedding, which released on 1 June 2018.

== Filmography ==
=== As producer ===
Year	Title	Notes
2010	Aisha	An adaptation of Jane Austen's 1815 novel Emma
2014	Khoobsurat	Loosely based on the 1980 film Khubsoorat
2018	Veere Di Wedding	
2023	Thank You for Coming	
2024	Crew	
