= Ananya Panday =

Indian actress (born 1998)

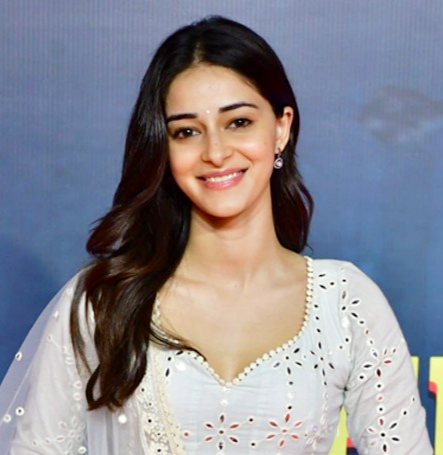
- Panday in 2024
- Born: 30 October 1998 (age 28); Mumbai, Maharashtra, India
- Occupation: Actress
- Years active: 2019–present
- Father: Chunky Panday
- Relatives: Panday family

Ananya Panday (pronounced [əˈnənjaː ˈpaːɳɖeː]; born 30 October 1998) is an Indian actress who primarily works in Hindi films. Born to actor Chunky Panday, she began her acting career in 2019 with roles in the romantic comedies Student of the Year 2 and Pati Patni Aur Woh. These performances earned her the Filmfare Award for Best Female Debut. In 2025, she was featured in Forbes Asia's 30 Under 30 list.

Panday's two subsequent theatrical releases were poorly received, but she had a commerc ial success with a brief role in the comedy Dream Girl 2 (2023). On streaming, her performances as a young woman navigating the perils of urban life and technology in the drama films Gehraiyaan (2022) and Kho Gaye Hum Kahan (2023), the thriller film CTRL (2024), and the comedy series Call Me Bae (2024) were well received. She earned further praise for her role as a lawyer in the courtroom drama Kesari Chapter 2 (2025), which was also a box-office success.

== Early life and family ==
Panday was born on 30 October 1998 to actor Chunky Panday and costume designer Bhavana Pandey (née Khosla) in Mumbai, Maharashtra. Her mother is Punjabi. She has a younger sister named Rysa. Her grandfather Sharad Panday, was an Indian heart surgeon. Her uncle Chikki Panday is a businessperson and her aunt Deanne Panday is a wellness coach, and their children, Alanna Pandey is a YouTuber, and Ahaan Panday is an actor. She has described her childhood as "very privileged and cushioned", and has said that she aspired to be an actress from a young age.

Panday studied at Dhirubhai Ambani International School until 2017. She participated in Vanity Fair's Le Bal des débutantes event in Paris in 2017. When asked if she missed out on higher education, Panday described film sets as her film school.

== Career ==
=== Early work (2019–2022) ===
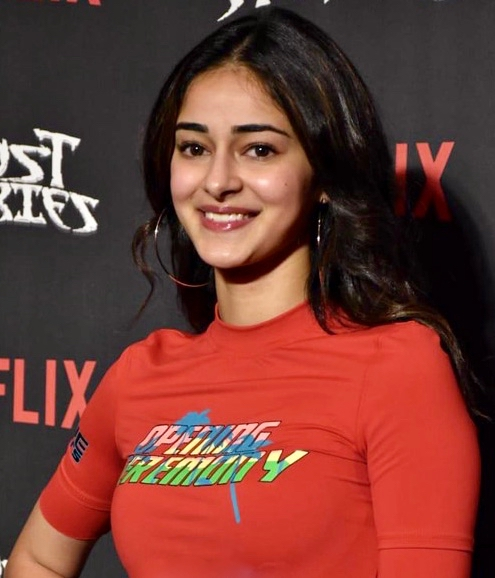
Panday in 2019

Panday made her acting debut in 2019 with the teen film Student of the Year 2, co-starring Tiger Shroff and Tara Sutaria, which was produced by Karan Johar's studio Dharma Productions. Writing for Scroll.in, Nandini Ramnath felt that Panday showed potential in an unremarkable film. The film did not perform well at the box-office. Panday next starred in Pati Patni Aur Woh (2019), a remake of the 1978 film of the same name, alongside Kartik Aaryan and Bhumi Pednekar. She played a secretary who indulges in an affair with a married man, which was portrayed by Ranjeeta Kaur in the original. India Today mentioned that Panday is "bland and boring with no spice." With a worldwide gross of ₹1.15 billion (US$12 million), it emerged as a commercial success. Panday won the Filmfare Award for Best Female Debut for her performance in both Student of the Year 2 and Pati Patni Aur Woh.

In 2020, Panday appeared in the action film Khaali Peeli, starring Ishaan Khatter. The film was released digitally on Zee Plex. She next appeared alongside Deepika Padukone, Siddhant Chaturvedi and Dhairya Karwa in the 2022 romantic drama Gehraiyaan, which released on Amazon Prime Video. Her performance was well-received, with Anna M. M. Vetticad from Firstpost writing, "The surprise in this ensemble is Panday who brings a gravitas to Tia's confusion and innocence that makes you wonder why she chose to debut with the hollow gloss of Student of the Year 2". Her final release of the year came with Vijay Deverakonda in Puri Jagannadh's action film Liger, a bilingual production in Hindi and Telugu. Panday's father revealed that she was initially hesitant to accept the film, as she felt she was too young for the role, but he convinced her to take on the project. The film was a critical and commercial failure, with Panday's performance being panned.

=== Critical recognition in streaming and subsequent projects (2023–present) ===
In the spiritual sequel Dream Girl 2 (2023), Panday played the brief role of the love interest of Ayushmann Khurrana's character. The Times of India's Dhaval Roy dismissed her role and accent. The Indian Express's Shubhra Gupta concurred that Panday didn't "have much to do" but observed that she is "getting better when there’s not too much pressure on her to deliver". It emerged as one of the year's highest-grossing Hindi films. She then starred in Kho Gaye Hum Kahan, a coming-of-age drama about the negative effects of social media, alongside Chaturvedi and Adarsh Gourav. Saibal Chatterjee of NDTV wrote that she "does a fair enough job of a character stuck in a single-note loop", while Scroll.in's Udita Jhunjhunwala found her "highly convincing as the jilted obsessive stalker seeking social media validation". The Indian Express evaluated that her urban roles in Gehraiyaan and Kho Gaye Hum Kahan suited the actress better than the ones she performed in commercial cinema, such as Dream Girl 2. Panday was awarded a Filmfare OTT Award for Best Actor in a Web Original Film – Critics (Female) for her performance in Kho Gaye Hum Kahan.

In September 2024, she portrayed an ostracised fashion influencer in the Amazon Prime Video comedy series Call Me Bae, produced by Johar. Panday expressed how her foray into the comedic genre was challenging, and emphasised the difficulty in having to headline a project rather than play a reacting role to the lead star as she had done previously. The series had a mixed reception from critics, but her performance was better received. Sukanya Verma of Rediff.com praised her comic timing in a role that mirrored the actress' own privilege. The Hindu's Shilajit Mitra analysed that her privileged characters in Gehraiyaan, Kho Gaye Hum Kahan and Call Me Bae were all "in her proximate wheelhouse". For her performance, she won the Filmfare OTT Award for Best Actor in a Comedy Series – (Female). The following month, Panday starred in Vikramaditya Motwane's screenlife thriller CTRL for Netflix, which is about an influencer targeted by a malicious AI app. Nandini Ramnath of Scroll.in believed that after Kho Gaye Hum Kahan, she was once again "wholly convincing" as a Gen Z woman negatively affected by technology. For her performance, she received a Filmfare OTT Award nomination for Best Actor in a Web Original Film – (Female).

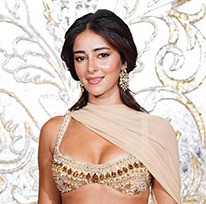
Panday in 2025

Acknowledging her previous three releases as urban-set, social media-centred projects, Panday returned to commercial cinema in 2025 with the Dharma Productions films Kesari Chapter 2 and Tu Meri Main Tera Main Tera Tu Meri. The former was a courtroom drama starring Akshay Kumar as C. Sankaran Nair, with Panday portraying a fictional lawyer who assists him in his legal battle against the British Raj. Set against the backdrop of the 1919 Jallianwala Bagh massacre, she prepared for the role by undertaking over a year of Punjabi dialect training and shadowing practising female lawyers. In a positive review of the film, a critic for Filmfare wrote that she "surprises with her restraint and grace" in an against-type role. In the latter, Panday reunited with Aaryan in a romantic comedy, playing an author whose relationship with a US-based wedding planner leads to personal and professional conflict. Zinia B of The Hindu was critical of her performance, writing that: "Panday appears completely clueless, struggling to bring conviction or nuance to a role that already gives her very little to work with". While Kesari Chapter 2 emerged as a moderate commercial success, Tu Meri Main Tera Main Tera Tu Meri was a box-office bomb.

In 2026, Panday starred opposite Lakshya in the romantic drama Chand Mera Dil, produced by Johar. It tells the story of a young couple whose relationship is strained following an unexpected pregnancy. WION's Pragati Awasthi considered Panday's work among the strongest of her career and praised her chemistry with Lakshya despite the film's weak writing, while Aishani Biswas of Outlook felt that her performance "often lean[ed] towards heightened drama"; however, both agreed that the screenplay ultimately limited her potential. Following the film’s release, Panday faced online backlash and social media trolling over her performance in the film's Bharatanatyam sequence. It failed commercially. She will continue her work with Johar in the second season of Call Me Bae.

== Media image ==
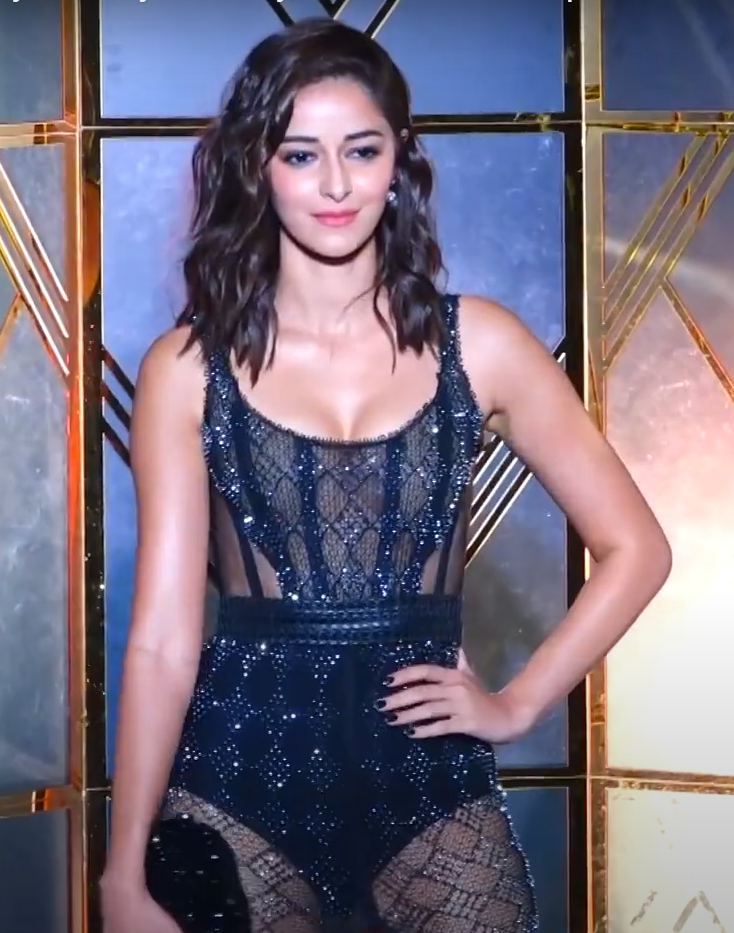
Panday in 2022

Panday has frequently combated negative attention and online trolling, for being a beneficiary of nepotism within the Hindi film industry. She said, "It isn't as easy as people say it is. If you have access and don't have the talent to back it up, people won't invest their money in you. Having said that, I do believe nepotism exists and it exists in all industries, not just Bollywood." She received backlash for comments made during CNN's 2019 Newcomers Roundtable, where she spoke about her struggles as a product of nepotism, noting that her father had never been on Johar's talk show Koffee with Karan as a sign of his limited success. Her remarks prompted a now-viral response from actor Siddhant Chaturvedi, in which he highlighted the disparity between insiders and outsiders in the film industry. The Hollywood Reporter India reported that after the intense social media trolling she received for being a nepo baby, "all the noise and early backlash faded once she proved herself with films like Gehraiyaan (2022) and CTRL (2024)". The Print noted that she has carved a niche for herself as Bollywood's Gen Z star by portraying characters that resonate deeply with her generation. In 2019, she launched an initiative named So Positive to create awareness about social media bullying, prevent negativity and build a positive community. At the Economic Times Awards in 2019, the project was named Initiative of the Year.

Panday has featured in The Times of India's "50 Most Desirable Women" list. She ranked 37th in 2019, and 31st in 2020. In 2025, Forbes Asia featured her in their 30 Under 30 list. The same year, GQ India listed her among the nation's most influential young people and The Business of Fashion featured her in their BoF 500 list of people shaping the global fashion industry. In 2026, The Hollywood Reporter India featured her in their Women in Entertainment Power List. Panday is a celebrity endorser for several brands, such as Puma, Lakmé, Maybelline, TRESemmé, Garnier, Skechers, Vega, Esprit, Fastrack, Gillette and Timex. She is the brand ambassador for international brands like Swarovski, Jimmy Choo and American Eagle. In 2025, she was named the first Indian global ambassador for the luxury brand Chanel. Panday's brand value was estimated by Kroll Inc. (formerly Duff & Phelps) to be US$35.2 million in 2024.

== Filmography ==
Key
| † | Denotes films that have not yet been released |

=== Films ===
- All films are in Hindi unless otherwise noted.

| Year | Title | Role | Notes | Ref. |
|---|---|---|---|---|
| 2019 | Student of the Year 2 | Shreya Randhawa | | |
| 2019 | Pati Patni Aur Woh | Tapasya Singh | | |
| 2020 | Khaali Peeli | Pooja Sharma | | |
| 2022 | Gehraiyaan | Tia Khanna | | |
| 2022 | Liger | Tanya Pandey | Hindi-Telugu bilingual film | |
| 2023 | Rocky Aur Rani Kii Prem Kahaani | Unnamed | Special appearance in the song "Heart Throb" | |
| 2023 | Dream Girl 2 | Pari Srivastava | | |
| 2023 | Kho Gaye Hum Kahan | Ahana Singh | | |
| 2024 | Bad Newz | Herself | Special appearance | |
| 2024 | Khel Khel Mein | Rehana | Voice appearance | |
| 2024 | CTRL | Nella Awasthi | | |
| 2025 | Kesari Chapter 2 | Dilreet Gill | | |
| 2025 | Tu Meri Main Tera Main Tera Tu Meri | Rumi Wardhan Singh | | |
| 2026 | Chand Mera Dil | Chandni Prasad Rawat | | |

=== Television ===
| Year | Title | Role | Notes | Ref. |
|---|---|---|---|---|
| 2020–present | Fabulous Lives of Bollywood Wives | Herself | | |
| 2022 | Dance Ikon | Guest | As part of Liger promotions | |
| 2024 | Call Me Bae | Bella "Bae" Chowdhary | | |

=== Music video ===
| Year | Title | Performers | Notes | Ref. |
|---|---|---|---|---|
| 2020 | "Kudi Nu Nachne De" | Vishal Dadlani, Sachin–Jigar | Promotional song for the film Angrezi Medium | |

=== Dubbing role ===
| Year | Title | Character | Dub Language | Original Language |
|---|---|---|---|---|
| 2024 | Inside Out 2 | Riley | English | Hindi |

== Awards and nominations ==
| Year | Award | Category | Work | Result | Ref. |
|---|---|---|---|---|---|
| 2019 | 26th Screen Awards | Best Female Debut | Student of the Year 2 | Nominated | |
| 2019 | 26th Screen Awards | Fresh Face of the Year | —N/a | Won | |
| 2020 | 65th Filmfare Awards | Best Female Debut | Student of the Year 2 | Won | |
| 2020 | 65th Filmfare Awards | Best Female Debut | Pati Patni Aur Woh | Won | |
| 2020 | Zee Cine Awards | Best Female Debut | Student of the Year 2 | Won | |
| 2020 | Zee Cine Awards | Best Supporting Actress | Pati Patni Aur Woh | Nominated | |
| 2020 | 21st IIFA Awards | Star Debut of the Year – Female | Student of the Year 2 | Won | |
| 2021 | Lokmat Stylish Awards | Best Stylish Glamorous Icon | —N/a | Won | |
| 2022 | Lokmat Stylish Awards | Most Stylish Gen Z Star | —N/a | Won | |
| 2022 | 22nd Indian Television Academy Awards | Best Debutant Actress of the Year - OTT | Gehraiyaan | Won | |
| 2023 | Zee Cine Awards | Best Supporting Actress | Gehraiyaan | Nominated | |
| 2023 | Bollywood Hungama Style Icons | Stylish Actor People's Choice (Female) | —N/a | Won | |
| 2023 | Pinkvilla Style Icons Awards | Most Glamorous Icon | —N/a | Won | |
| 2023 | Lokmat Stylish Awards | Stylish Glam Icon | —N/a | Won | |
| 2024 | Zee Cine Awards | Performer of the Year | Kho Gaye Hum Kahan | Won | |
| 2024 | Pinkvilla Screen and Style Icons Awards | Most Stylish Performer of the Year (Female) | Kho Gaye Hum Kahan | Won | |
| 2024 | News18 Reel Awards | Breakthrough Performance of the Year – Female | Kho Gaye Hum Kahan | Won | |
| 2024 | Bollywood Hungama Style Icons | Most Stylish Leading Entertainer of the Year (Female) | —N/a | Won | |
| 2024 | Filmfare OTT Awards | Best Actor – Web Original Film (Female) | Kho Gaye Hum Kahan | Nominated | |
| 2024 | Filmfare OTT Awards | Best Actor in a Film – Critics (Female) | Kho Gaye Hum Kahan | Won | |
| 2024 | Bollywood Hungama OTT India Fest | Best Actress – People's Choice | Kho Gaye Hum Kahan | Nominated | |
| 2024 | Bollywood Hungama OTT India Fest | Best Actress – Popular Choice | Kho Gaye Hum Kahan | Won | |
| 2024 | NDTV Indian of the Year | Youth Icon of the Year | —N/a | Won | |
| 2025 | Pinkvilla Screen and Style Icons Awards | Best Actress (OTT) – Popular Choice | CTRL | Won | |
| 2025 | IIFA Digital Awards | Performance in a Leading Role – Female | CTRL | Nominated | |
| 2025 | IIFA Digital Awards | Performance in a Leading Role – Female (Series) | Call Me Bae | Nominated | |
| 2025 | News18 Reel Awards | Best Actor OTT (Female) | Call Me Bae | Nominated | |
| 2025 | Indian Film Festival of Melbourne | Best Actor (Female) – Web Series | Call Me Bae | Nominated | |
| 2025 | GQ Men of the Year Award | Outstanding Achievement | —N/a | Won | |
| 2025 | Bollywood Hungama OTT India Fest | Youth Icon of the Year – (Female) | —N/a | Nominated | |
| 2025 | Bollywood Hungama OTT India Fest | Actor of the Year – (Female) | Kesari Chapter 2 | Nominated | |
| 2025 | Times of India Film Awards | Acting Excellence – Web Film (Female) | CTRL | Nominated | |
| 2025 | Times of India Film Awards | Acting Excellence – Comedy Series | Call Me Bae | Nominated | |
| 2025 | Times of India Film Awards | Acting Excellence in Web Series – People’s Choice (Female) | Call Me Bae | Nominated | |
| 2025 | Filmfare OTT Awards | Best Actor – Comedy Series (Female) | Call Me Bae | Won | |
| 2025 | Filmfare OTT Awards | Best Actor – Web Original Film (Female) | CTRL | Nominated | |
| 2026 | Zee Cine Awards | Best Supporting Actress | Kesari Chapter 2 | Won | |
| 2026 | News18 Reel Awards | Best Actor – Female | Kesari Chapter 2 | Won | |
| 2026 | News18 Reel Awards | Best Actor – Female | Tu Meri Main Tera Main Tera Tu Meri | Nominated | |
| 2026 | Pinkvilla Screen and Style Icons Awards | Best Supporting Actress | Kesari Chapter 2 | Won | |
