= Vendhu Thanindhathu Kaadu =

2022 film directed by Gautham Vasudev Menon

- Theatrical release poster
- Directed by: Gautham Vasudev Menon
- Screenplay by: Gautham Vasudev Menon; B. Jeyamohan
- Story by: B. Jeyamohan
- Produced by: Ishari K. Ganesh
- Starring: Silambarasan; Siddhi Idnani
- Cinematography: Siddhartha Nuni
- Edited by: Anthony
- Music by: A. R. Rahman
- Production company: Vels Film International
- Distributed by: Red Giant Movies
- Release date: 15 September 2022
- Running time: 178 minutes
- Country: India
- Language: Tamil
- Budget: ₹30 crore
- Box office: ₹100 crore

Vendhu Thanindhathu Kaadu (transl. The Scorched Forest), also known as Vendhu Thanindhathu Kaadu: Part I – The Kindling, is a 2022 Indian Tamil-language neo-noir gangster drama film directed by Gautham Vasudev Menon and written by B. Jeyamohan. It is produced by Ishari K. Ganesh. The film stars Silambarasan and Siddhi Idnani, with Radhika Sarathkumar, Neeraj Madhav and Siddique in supporting roles. It revolves around a man who gets involved in the underworld when he leaves Thoothukudi for a better life.

Silambarasan and Menon initially worked on a romantic film titled Nadhigalile Neeradum Suriyan, under Ganesh's production, but upon the former's insistence of a rustic-toned script, he developed another storyline based on one of Jeyamohan's novels, and the film was officially announced with principal photography commencing in August 2021. The film, which was shot in Tiruchendur, Chennai and Mumbai, concluded its production in April 2022. The music is composed by A. R. Rahman, with cinematography handled by Siddhartha Nuni and edited by Anthony.

Vendhu Thanindhathu Kaadu was released theatrically on 15 September 2022. It received positive reviews from critics, with praise towards Silambarasan's performance, direction, screenwriting, cinematography, and music, but was criticized for the slow pace and rushed climax. A sequel was also announced and is in development.

== Plot ==
Muthuveeran is a BSc graduate from a village in Naduvakurichi in Tuticorin, Tamil Nadu, who spends his days picking thorns in the sun. When the field he works at catches fire, the owner threatens to call the police on Muthu. His mother, Latchumi, learns about his aggressive and impulsive behaviour when Muthu threatens to kill the owner with a sickle. Fearing for Muthu's life, Latchumi takes Muthu and his younger sister, Gomathi, to their uncle, Chermadurai, to find him a job elsewhere. Chermadurai arranges for Muthu's job in Chembur, Mumbai. After attending a phone call, Chermadurai is panic-stricken and gives Muthu a letter to post as soon as possible.

The following morning, Chermadurai is found dead in his room, having committed suicide. Instead of posting the letter, Muthu goes to the address mentioned in it, to Mumbai, where he takes up work in a parotta store owned by Esakki and starts earning money for his struggling family. During this time, another worker named Saravanan helps Muthu adjust to Mumbai. Muthu also falls in love with an older woman, Paavai, who works in a garment shop opposite the store. Muthu and a bunch of the parotta store workers go to a movie where a scuffle ends with Maasanam, one of the workers, shooting at the sky. Maasanam and Arunjunai, another worker, go to murder a man, but they end up getting killed. Muthu learns from Saravanan that Esakki works for Senthooran, who works for Karukkavel "Kaarji", a gangster from Tirunelveli.

Kaarji's main rival is a Malayali gangster named Kutty Krishnan Nair, "Kutty Bhai", whose gang is constantly at odds with Kaarji's. Muthu also learns that Chermadurai used to work for Kaarji. When Kaarji and Kutty Bhai had a fallout, Kutty Bhai arranged an attack on him at a temple, where Kaarji escaped and assumed Chermadurai to be a mole for Kutty Bhai since he had left for his hometown at the time. Unable to prove his innocence, Chermadurai took his own life. Realising this, Muthu and Sridharan, a man Kutty Bhai uses as a sex slave, decide to leave Mumbai. However, Sridharan gets caught, and Muthu becomes forced to kill Kutty Bhai's goons, who attack the parotta store at night.

Muthu and the others hit back by killing Kutty Bhai's brother, which impresses Kaarji, who appoints Muthu as his bodyguard. Muthu starts making money, which he sends to Latchumi and Gomathi. Six months later, Muthu works with Kaarji as his bodyguard and becomes one of Kaarji's most trusted men. During what was supposed to be a meeting with an actress, Kutty Bhai's men ambush Kaarji, but Muthu fends them off and saves Kaarji. Kaarji orders Muthu and his men to kill Kutty Bhai, but they fail. In a meeting between Kaarji, Kutty Bhai and Rauf Bhai, someone sets up the man controlling Mumbai where Rauf Bhai says that if either Kaarji or Kutty Bhai dies, the other one will die. Meanwhile, Paavai meets Muthu again. Despite learning about his profession, they agree to Muthu's marriage proposal and soon get married.

Kutty Bhai becomes angry at Kaarji. So, he hires a contract killer named Rawthar to kill Kaarji. Kutty Bhai has Rawthar kidnap and drug Paavai, and Saravanan tells Muthu that Kaarji had taken her as a mistress. Muthu goes after Kaarji, intending to kill him and finds Paavai in Kaarji's hotel room. Kaarji is shocked to see Paavai. Using the confusion to his advantage, Rawthar shoots Kaarji and plants the gun in Muthu's hand. Kaarji's bodyguards arrive. Word soon spreads that Muthu killed Kaarji. Muthu suspects Saravanan and discovers that he works for Kutty Bhai. He was the reason behind Kaarji's death. His men kill Saravanan to show their loyalty to Muthu. Rawthar tries to kill Muthu and Paavai but only manages to sever one of Muthu's fingers before escaping. Muthu takes Paavai to a hospital. Esakki kidnaps Paavai's family as he thinks that Muthu killed Kaarji. Muthu goes to the parotta store and explains that he did not kill Kaarji before leaving, having decided to live normally. Simultaneously, Sridharan's girlfriend kills Kutty Bhai as he harasses her while celebrating Kaarji's death.

Five years later, Muthu has become a highly respected crime lord in Lucknow. He had a son who had died. Except for his daily life as a crime boss, Muthu leads life happily with Paavai. With the help of Iyer, Muthu arranges a meeting with a group of gangsters in Allahabad who are responsible for his son's death and manages to kill them all. Following this, Muthu stumbles upon Sridharan, now a married barber. The sequel will reveal their backstory.

== Cast ==
- Silambarasan as Muthuveeran alias Muthu
- Siddhi Idnani as Paavai
- Radhika Sarathkumar as Latchumi
- Umesh Kaushik
- Neeraj Madhav as Sridharan
- Siddique as Kutty Krishnan Nair alias Kutty Bhai
- Aadithya Baaskar as Adhi
- Shivamani as Rauf Bhai
- Deepak Dutt Sharma as Samir Bhai
- Aangelina Abraham as Gomathi
- Appukutty as Saravanan
- Jaffer Sadiq as Rawther (Muthu Raasa)
- Bava Chelladurai as Chermadurai
- Kavithalayaa Krishnan as Ganesh Iyer
- Tulasi as Durga
- Sara as Karukkuvel (Karjee)
- R Richard James Peter as Esakki
- Phathmen as Maasanam
- Mak Manigandan as Arunjunai
- Geetha Kailasam as Selvi
- Shrisha as Sapna
- Ajmina Kassim as MahaLatchumi
- Jaisinth as Arunachalam
- Sathya as Senthooran
- Delhi Ganesh in a cameo appearance as Iyer

== Production ==
=== Development ===
In February 2018, Gautham Vasudev Menon announced a sequel to Vinnaithaandi Varuvaayaa (2010) titled Ondraga, which would focus on Karthik and his best friends from college travelling to the United States to attend a wedding ten years after the events of the first film. It had Silambarasan reprising his role from the original film, and had pulled out prominent names from South Indian film fraternity, but the film did not begin production. Later, Silambarasan and Menon worked on the short film Karthik Dial Seytha Yenn, based on the characters from the first film which was shot during the COVID-19 lockdown in India.

Soon after its release, speculations arose that Silambarasan and Menon would collaborate for the sequel of Vinnaithaandi Varuvaayaa, or a fresh script written by Menon. In January 2021, Silambarasan announced his new project which will be directed by Menon with Ishari K. Ganesh of Vels Film International bankrolling the project, thus marking the third collaboration between Menon and Silambarasan. A. R. Rahman was announced as the music composer in early February 2021, with lyricist Thamarai also joining the technical team. On Menon's birthday (25 February 2021), the makers announced the film's title as Nadhigalile Neeradum Suriyan, named after a line from the song "Ondra Renda Asaigal" from Menon's Kaakha Kaakha (2003).

=== Pre-production ===
During the production of Nadhigalile Neeradum Suriyan, Silambarasan insisted Menon to work on a raw and rustic-toned script, leading to a change in the storyline as well as the film genre. Menon brought in the basic plotline of the novel Agni Kunjondru Kanden (inspired from a poem written by Subramania Bharati) by screenwriter B. Jeyamohan, instead of a fresh script he planned. On 6 August 2021, Menon announced the film's new title Vendhu Thanindhathu Kaadu, also named from one of the lines from the same poem written by Bharati. The first look also released on the same day, featuring Silambarasan in a rustic avatar. He had reportedly lost 15 kilos for his role in the film. Ganesh described his role as "a character he hasn't done before". In the same month, Kayadu Lohar was announced as the lead actress. However, the role went to Siddhi Idnani in January 2022.

Director-cinematographer Siddhartha Nuni, who worked in the Kannada film Lucia (2013) was hired for the project, along with Anthony, who regularly collaborated with Menon in his previous ventures, handled the editing works. Silambarasan shared a picture on social media revealing his current transformation for the film, to quell rumours that the first look was "photoshopped". A report from The Times of India stated that the actor had hired a special instructor to reduce his weight for the past six months and had also trained for the stunt sequences too. The film's cast further included Malayalam actors Siddique and Neeraj Madhav, playing pivotal roles in the film.

The film revolves around the plight of migrant workers, which is Menon's first attempt on portraying the tale of marginalised section in the society. Menon also stated that Silambarasan would be seen in five different looks as the film narrates his journey from teenage to adulthood. Jeyamohan said the film would not be a full-fledged rural action drama like Asuran, but a portion of it would be set in a rural backdrop, and the film will also feature urban portions. He added that the film would be rustic tonally, with the style of Menon's earlier directorial ventures. Menon stated that the film would be his response to critics accusing his films of being too identical or repetitive.

=== Filming ===
Principal photography began on 7 August 2021 at Tiruchendur. On 23 August 2021, shooting was suspended due to the tussle between Tamil Film Producers Council (TFPC) and Film Employees Federation of South India (FEFSI), as several producers filed complaints against Silambarasan in the past over his failure to commit to the projects he signed and also demanded for compensation. Following Ganesh's assurance to compensate the producers, shooting resumed on 26 August, with the second schedule beginning in Chennai.

On 20 September 2021, the makers announced that the second schedule had been completed. The team took a brief break, following Silambarasan's involvement's in the post-production of Maanaadu and on 18 October, Silambarasan went to Mumbai to begin the third schedule. It was reported that the team had planned to resume the shooting in Chennai and had constructed a set resembling Mumbai, in a private film studio. Hollywood-based stunt choreographer Lee Whittaker was hired for the action sequences, joined the schedule in Mumbai on mid-October. The team had several complications on the film's production in Mumbai, citing the difficulties in travel due to pandemic and weather conditions, and decided to begin the final schedule in Chennai for more than 25 days. However, contrary to the earlier statements, the final schedule began on 7 December 2021 in Mumbai.

On 11 December, Silambarasan was hospitalised in Chennai due to a viral infection, resulting in shooting being stalled for a few days. A minor shooting schedule was later held in Chennai on 3 January 2022, and took place for 10 days. By 13 January 2022, the Chennai shooting schedule has been wrapped and was informed that the team will return to Mumbai for the final schedule which involves few patchwork scenes. A source from the production team stated that the shooting in Mumbai, will be stalled for some time due to the rise in COVID-19 infections in the city, and will be planned appropriately only after the restrictions being lifted. As of mid-January, 50% of the film was completed. The third and final schedule began in Mumbai on 9 February 2022. Filming completely wrapped on 15 April 2022.

== Music ==
The music for the film is composed by A. R. Rahman in his third collaboration with Menon after Vinnaithaandi Varuvaayaa (2010) and Achcham Yenbadhu Madamaiyada (2016) and fourth collaboration with Silambarasan after the former movies and Chekka Chivantha Vaanam (2018). The audio rights were purchased by Think Music. Two songs: "Kaalathukkum Nee Venum" and "Marakkuma Nenjam" were released as singles on 6 May and 15 August 2022. The film's soundtrack was released on 31 August 2022.

== Release ==
=== Theatrical ===
The film was released in theatres on 15 September 2022, by Red Giant Movies. Ahimsa Entertainment distributed the film in the UK and Europe.

=== Home media ===
The film began streaming on Amazon Prime Video from 13 October 2022.

== Reception ==
=== Critical response ===
Vendhu Thanindhathu Kaadu received mostly positive reviews from critics. On the review aggregator website Rotten Tomatoes, 100% of 5 critics' reviews are positive, with an average rating of 6.5/10.

Krishna Selvaseelan of Tamil Guardian rated the film 4 out of 5 stars, writing, “It is also definitely Menon’s best film — it is a hugely pleasant surprise to see him innovate and take risks so late in his career, which has certainly paid off.” Nidhima Taneja of ThePrint rated the film 3.5 out of 5 stars and wrote "It is the journey of the most incomprehensible — or an underdog if you will — man in the pyramid that makes Vendhu Thanindhathu Kaadu worth a watch". Sowmya Rajendran of The News Minute rated the film 3.5 out of 5 stars and wrote "Gautham Vasudev Menon’s film has all the familiar material that you expect from a gangster film but also a few departures and inclusions that keep things engrossing". Karthik Keramalu of Firstpost rated the film 3.5 out of 5 stars and wrote "The movie humanizes the lives of gangsters who’re at the bottom of the chain". M. Suganth of The Times of India rated the film 3 out of 5 stars and called it "an uneven gangster saga that works in parts". Kirubhakar Purushothaman of The Indian Express rated the film 3 out of 5 stars and wrote "Vendhu Thanindhathu Kaadu begins on a great note and keeps the momentum till the interval only to drop the ball in the climax. Pinkvilla rated the film 3 out of 5 stars and wrote "Vendhu Thanindhathu Kaadu is an entertaining gangster drama that has some amazing performances in place". Janani K. of India Today rated the film 2.5 out of 5 stars and wrote "Vendhu Thanindhadhu Kaadu could have been Simbu’s Pudhupettai, but it falls short by a few miles. The second half could have been more nuanced". Srivatsan S of The Hindu wrote "The biggest positive has got to be how well-rounded the screenplay structure is: where it begins is where the film also ends."

A critic for Deccan Herald rated 3 out of 5 and wrote "The template of a small-town man getting sucked into the criminal world isn’t new. Gautham reinvents it and he has a great partner in crime in Simbu. It’s a great combination." Sowndarya Athimuthu of The Quint rated the film 3 out of 5 stars and wrote "Though Vendhu Thanindhadhu Kaadu might come across as a usual gangster saga, it is a unique attempt from Gautham Vasudev Menon, who submits to writer Jeyamohan’s vision". Sudhir Srinivasan of Cinema Express rated the film 3 out of 5 stars and wrote "VTK shows plenty of potential, and the disappointment is that it doesn’t quite hit as many highs as you would expect".

=== Box office ===
On the first day of its release, Vendhu Thanindhathu Kaadu grossed over ₹12 crore worldwide with the film collecting over ₹8.25 crore in Tamil Nadu. Within four days of its release, the film collected a whopping ₹55 crore. The film grossed over ₹85 crore worldwide and became one of the highest grossing Tamil films of the year.

== Legal issues ==
Before the production of the film, several producers had filed a complaint against Silambarasan at the Tamil Film Producers Council (TFPC) for not working on the projects he had received advance payments for before the shoot. Global Infotainment's Michael Rayappan too criticised Silambarasan, after failing to compensate the losses incurred during the production of Anbanavan Asaradhavan Adangadhavan (2017). As a result, the Tamil Film Producers Council issued a red card against Silambarasan following the complaints and also insisted the Film Employees Federation of South India (FEFSI) to stop the production works on the film. However, FEFSI had supported the film because Ishari K. Ganesh had helped the association in several ways during the COVID-19 lockdown. It eventually resulted in the split between TFPC and FEFSI, and the shooting was disrupted following this incident. Fans of Silambarasan eventually supported the actor and condemned TFPC's actions; they started using the hashtag "#SaveTamilCinemafromTFPC" eventually being trending for two days on Twitter. Later, on 26 August 2021, Ganesh admitted to pay the requested amount on behalf of the actor in order to resume shooting; an assurance letter was submitted to the producers council.

== Sequel ==
The complete title Vendhu Thanindhathu Kaadu Part I: The Kindling was unveiled in early September 2022, confirming that a sequel was in development.
