= Jamba Lakidi Pamba =

Jamba Lakidi Pamba may refer to:

- Jamba Lakidi Pamba (1992 film), an Indian Telugu-language fantasy comedy film
- Jamba Lakidi Pamba (2018 film), an Indian Telugu-language comedy film, based on the above
