= Sonia Rathee =

Indian-American actress, model, and dancer

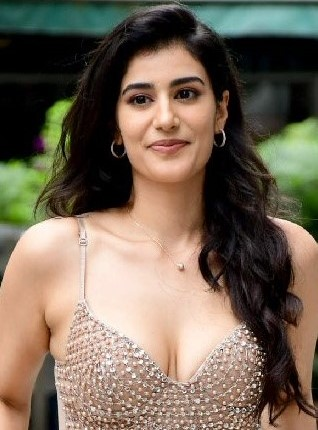
- Rathee at a Tara vs Bilal trailer preview, October 8, 2022
- Born: Hisar, Haryana, India
- Education: Boston University
- Occupations: Actress; model; dancer
- Years active: 2021–present
- Notable work: Broken But Beautiful
- Height: 172 cm (5 ft 8 in)
- Relatives: Ankur Rathee (brother)

Sonia Rathee (born 25 December 1996) is an Indian-American actress, model, and dancer who works primarily in Indian television and film. She is best known for her starring roles in the romantic drama series Broken But Beautiful (ALTBalaji) and the Netflix comedy Decoupled, as well as the films Tara vs Bilal and Kapkapiii. Rathee is also featured in Badshah's 2022 music video, "Chamkeela Chehra," and King's "Sarkaare."

== Early life: dates, places, education ==
Sonia Rathee spent part of her life in Southern California – specifically San Diego – and, pursued higher education in the United States. She later moved to Mumbai to pursue a career in acting.

== Career: sequence and critical reception ==
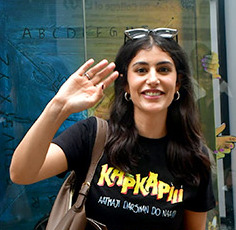
Rathee at a promotional event for Kapkapiii, May 22, 2025.

Rathee made her acting debut in 2020 opposite to Vishal Vashishtha in the YouTube short film Shaadi Aaj Kal: A Wedding Story by FilterCopy.

In 2021, Rathee rose to prominence portraying Rumi Desai, a lead character in all ten episodes of the third season of the romantic drama web series Broken But Beautiful, in English and Hindi, streaming on ALTBalaji and MX Player. She starred opposite Sidharth Shukla, earning widespread recognition for her performance, including a 2021 International Iconic Awards nomination for "Best Actress in a Web Series."

In the same year, Rathee also played Masha in episodes 3 to 8 of the first season of the Netflix comedy series Decoupled, starring R. Madhavan and Surveen Chawla, which was released in both English and Hindi.

In 2022, Rathee made her Bollywood debut, co-starring as Tara in the romantic comedy film Tara vs Bilal, in Hindi, with Harshvardhan Rane as Bilal. The film was produced by John Abraham and released on Netflix.

Rathee starred as the lead in Badshah's 2022 music video "Chamkeela Chehra", directed by choreographer Punit Pathak. The music is on Badshah's album, Retropanda Part 1. In the music video, Rathee – the choreographed lead (backed by dance ensemble) - portrays a thief in a stylized bank heist. She trained in action choreography and performed the video's viral "hook step". (Note: Hook-step: In Indian popular music, especially in Indian hip-hop and Bollywood contexts, a hook-step is a catchy, repeatable dance move performed during a song's chorus (main repeated section). Often simple and visually distinct, it becomes closely associated with the track and is designed for easy imitation by fans and social media users. In "Chamkeela Chehra" (2022), Badshah and Sonia Rathee perform a fan-created hip-hop-inspired hook step that had gone viral prior to the video's release.)

Rathee also starred as the female lead in King's 2023 music video "Sarkaare," from his album New Life, directed by Arsh Grewal. The video, a nostalgic nod to early 2000s Bollywood romance, features Rathee alongside King.

See videos below at Sonia Rathee § External links.

In Night Encounters, a horror film in English and Hindi, released May 2023, Rathee plays a character named Sonia, with all principal actors—including her brother Ankur Rathee — portraying characters who share their real first names. The film was directed by Simmer Bhatia and filmed in Lonavala, India. The film was produced by Call Sheet Media LLC (Los Angeles; David Lautrec and Thomas Haldeman, managing members) and Kotadia Films (Sanjay Kotadia). The screenplay was a finalist at the Crimson Screen Horror Film Festival in 2018.

In 2025, Rathee played the role of Madhu in the Hindi horror-comedy film Kapkapiii, directed by Sangeeth Sivan. The film, also starring Tusshar Kapoor, Shreyas Talpade, and Siddhi Idnani, is a remake of the 2023 Malayalam film Romancham.

In 2025, Rathee is set to star in the upcoming Indian film Bhai Bhai (from Hindi and Gujarati, meaning "Brother Brother" or more idiomatically, "Brothers"), directed by Dhwani Gautam. The film, currently in production, features her alongside Esha Gupta and Maniesh Paul, with no confirmed release date or plot details announced as of July 2025.

In addition to acting, Rathee is a dancer and maintains a YouTube channel where she posts dance cover videos.

== Filmography ==
=== Short films ===
Year	Title	Role	Production
2020	Shaadi Aaj Kal: A Wedding Story	Sonia Rathee	FilterCopy

=== Television ===
Year	Show	Role	Language
2021	Broken But Beautiful (Season 3, ALTBalaji)	Rumi Desai (lead, all 10 episodes)	Hindi/English
2021	Decoupled (Netflix)	Masha (episodes 3–8)	English

=== Music video appearances ===
Year	Title	Singer(s)	Ref.
2022	"Chamkeela Chehra"	Badshah	
2023	"Sarkaare"	King	

=== Films ===
Year	Title	Role	Language
2022	Tara vs Bilal	Tara Kaul Sharma (Lead role)	Hindi
2023	Night Encounters	Sonia (her namesake)	English & Hindi
2025	Kapkapiii	Madhu	Hindi
TBA	Bhai Bhai †	TBA	English, Gujarati and Hindi

== 2025 BUDX NBA House Celebrity Basketball ==
On June 7, 2025, Rathee participated in the BUDX NBA House 3v3 Celebrity Game in at the NSCI Dome at SVP Stadium, Mumbai – a branded cultural event hosted by the National Basketball Association (NBA) and Budweiser. The event was part of the NBA's first-ever "BUDX NBA House" (BUDX = Budweiser Experience) in India, blending basketball with music, entertainment, and celebrity culture. Her team, captained by ACG Managing Director — and backer of the ACG–NBA Jump Program — Karan Singh, included rapper Badshah, actor Arvind Krishna, actor Varun Sood, actress Simran Kaur, and actor-host Harman Singha. They faced Team Payton, led by NBA Hall of Famer Gary Payton, with a lineup featuring actress Disha Patani, dancer-choreographer Melvin Louis, actor and TV personality Rannvijay Singha, 2022 India Women's National Basketball Team captain Shireen Limaye, professional basketball player (3x3 Pro Basketball League – Delhi Hoopers, Chandigarh Challengers – Elite Pro Basketball League, INBL) Dhruv Barman, actor Ankur Rathee (Rathee's brother), and entrepreneur Anand S. Ahuja (husband of actress Sonam Kapoor) as team captain.

Rathee described the experience as "absolutely surreal", expressing her excitement at playing alongside NBA legends and with her brother on the opposing team.

== Personal life ==
Rathee is currently based in Mumbai. Her older brother (born 1991), Ankur Rathee, is well known for his role as Arjun Nair in the series Four More Shots Please! (Amazon) and as Sam in Made in Heaven (Amazon).

== Awards and nominations ==
Year	Award	Category	Nominated work	Result	Ref.
2021	International Iconic Awards (Note: The International Iconic Awards are organized privately and primarily focus on honoring Indian film, television, OTT, and music performers. Established by Mohammed Nagaman Lateef, the awards are promoted through social media platforms (e.g., Instagram and X) and cater to regional media segments. While branded "International," the awards are largely Indian in scope, have no formal affiliation with government bodies or major industry guilds, and are best understood as part of the fan-driven entertainment awards ecosystem.)	Best Actress in a Web Series (Note: Officially listed as "Iconic Best Actress of India OTT" by the International Iconic Awards. While the awards use the term "OTT" (Over-the-Top) to describe digital streaming content, this is broadly equivalent to what is commonly called a "web series" in entertainment reporting. OTT refers to platforms like ALTBalaji, Netflix, Amazon Prime Video, and Disney+ Hotstar, which deliver content directly to viewers via the internet, bypassing traditional broadcast or cable. A web series is a scripted, episodic format made specifically for these platforms. Sonia Rathee's role in Broken But Beautiful, for example, qualifies as both a web series and part of the Indian OTT ecosystem, having been released on ALTBalaji.)	Broken But Beautiful	Nominated	

== See also ==
- List of Indian film actresses
- List of Indian television actresses
- List of Hindi film actresses
- List of Hindi television actresses

== Bibliography ==
=== Secondary references ===
- AdGully Bureau (July 6, 2022). "Badshah Includes Fan-Made Hookstep in 'Chamkeela Chehra'". AdGully. Mumbai: AdGully Network Pvt. Ltd. Archived from the original on July 7, 2025. OCLC 1035069897 (all editions), OCLC 1391817474 (all editions).
- Bhai Bhai (film) (In English, Gujarati, and Hindi). Directed by Dhwani Gautam, starring Esha Gupta, Sonia Rathee, and Hiten Patel. Produced by Nube International. IMDb. Title id: tt29383412. July 2025.
- Bollywood Hungama News Network (May 31, 2025). "Sonia Rathee Shares Excitement on Playing Star-Studded Budx NBA House Game; Says, 'It's Absolutely Surreal, I'm Getting To Play With Absolute Legends and Friends'". Bollywood Hungama. Archived from the original on June 1, 2025.
- Cyril, Grace (May 16, 2021). "Sidharth Shukla and Sonia Rathee's Broken But Beautiful 3 Is About Lost Love. Trailer Out". India Today (weekly magazine). Archived from the original on May 16, 2021.
- Dadhwal, Sheetal (June 28, 2021). "Sonia Rathee Found Acting Fascinating When She Visited Sets of Broken But Beautiful 2". The Tribune. Chandigarh, India. Archived from the original on July 5, 2025 – via Internet Archive (limited preview). OCLC 36205400 (all editions), OCLC 47351219 (all editions).
- Farzeen, Sana (April 12, 2020). "Who Is Sonia Rathee?". The Indian Express. Archived from the original on January 22, 2021.
- FP Staff (July 6, 2022). "Badshah's Chamkeela Chehra Music Video Is Out Now". Firstpost. Mumbai. Archived from the original on July 6, 2022.
- Ganguly, Raima (July 7, 2022). "Sonia Rathee Stuns as a Heist Queen in Chamkeela Chehra by Badshah". Indulge (Friday magazine supplement of The New Indian Express). Archived from the original on July 5, 2025.
- Gupta, Twinkle (June 25, 2025). "Esha Gupta Breaks Silence on Dating Hardik Pandya, Says 'It Ended Before We Even Reached the Dating Stage'". India TV News. Noida: Independent News Service Pvt. Ltd. Archived from the original on June 25, 2025. OCLC 1127186411 (all editions)
- Hindustan Times. New Delhi. ISSN 0972-0243; OCLC 231696742 (all editions).
1. Chaturvedi, Swati (3 September 2021). "Be Present, Wherever You Are, Says Sonia Rathee". Archived from the original on September 3, 2021.
2. Singh, Amanda (2 August 2022). "Sonia Rathee Says Her Problem in Acting Industry Was Adjusting to India: 'Now It Has Become My Home'". Archived from the original on August 2, 2022.
3. Kapoor, Mugdha (25 June 2024). "Rumi's Story Can't Go On: Broken But Beautiful Actor Sonia Rathee on Season 4 Being Skipped in Siddharth Shukla's Memory". Archived from the original on June 25, 2024.
4. See Sidharth Shukla – Indian actor and model (1980–2021).
- IANS (November 22, 2021). "Sonia Rathee Opens up on Sharing Screen Space With R Madhavan in Web Series Decoupled: 'So Much To Learn From Him ...'". Koimoi (Bollywood entertainment website which provides Bollywood news, box office reports, and film reviews). Mumbai. Archived from the original on November 22, 2021.
- International Iconic Awards: "Best Actress in a Web Series". IMDb Event ID: 0073358. Archived from the original on July 6, 2025.
- Malini, Miss (pseudonym of Malini Agarwal) (June 25, 2025). "Esha Gupta Speaks Out About Hardik Pandya Rumors: 'It Was Never Meant To Be'". MissMalini. Archived from the original on July 7, 2025.
- Mukherjee, Akankshya (May 27, 2025). "Tusshar Kapoor, Sonia Rathee & Siddhi Idnani Guess Bollywood Horror Movies | Never Have I Ever". Bollywood Bubble. Archived from the original on July 5, 2025.
- Mukherjee, Anindita (May 23, 2025). "Sonia Rathee Has This To Say About Her Co-Stars Shreyas Talpade, Tusshar Kapoor". News18. Archived from the original on May 22, 2025.
- The Times Group:
1. Navbharat Times [ नवभारत टाइम्स (Navabhārata Taimsa) ] (in Hindi). Delhi and Mumbai. LCCN 2004-225052; OCLC 225655104 (all editions), OCLC 53997231 (all editions).
  1. Mishra [मिश्रा], Uma [उमा] (July 4, 2022). "कौन हैं हुस्न की परी सोनिया राठी, जिन्होंने सिद्धार्थ शुक्ला से लेकर आर माधवन तक किया है काम" [Who Is the Beauty Queen Sonia Rathee, Who Has Worked With Everyone From Sidharth Shukla to R. Madhavan?]. Archived from the original on July 4, 2022.
  2. Sonal, Swapnal (January 8, 2022). Photos: "सुनो सोनिया, इतनी हसीन मत दिखा करो!" ["Hey Sonia, Don't Look So Gorgeous All the Time!"]. Archived from the original on June 26, 2025.
2. Times of India. Mumbai. ISSN 0971-8257; OCLC 23379369 (all editions).
  1. IANS (May 22, 2025). "Sonia Rathee Chalks Out the Contrast Between Kapkapiii Co-Actors Shreyas Talpade, Tusshar Kapoor". Archived from the original on May 20, 2025.
3. Economic Times, The (English ed.). Mumbai. ISSN 0013-0389; OCLC 61311680 (all editions).
  1. "Industry" – "YouTube to Stream NBA Games Live in India". February 15, 2025. Archived from the original on February 17, 2025.
4. Times Now. English-language news channel in India. ISSN 0971-8257; OCLC 23379369 (all editions).
  1. Das, Kusumika (June 12, 2025). "Sonia Rathee Recalls Learning 'Some of Biggest Life Lessons' From Sidharth Shukla: Had Student-Mentor Relationship – EXCL" (EXCL = Exclusive). Archived from the original on June 12, 2025.
- NDTV India. New Delhi. OCLC 1404341678 (all editions); OCLC 456214807 (all editions).
1. Tiwari [तिवारी], Priyanka [प्रियंका], ed. (May 23, 2025). "सिद्धार्थ शुक्ला की याद में इमोशनल हुईं 'ब्रोकन बट ब्यूटीफुल' एक्ट्रेस सोनिया राठी, बोलीं-मुझे आज भी आती है उनकी याद ..." ["Broken But Beautiful Actress Sonia Rathee Becomes Emotional Remembering Sidharth Shukla, Says 'I still miss him to this day ...'"] (in Hindi). Archived from the original on May 23, 2025.
2. Saini, Narendra (May 22, 2025). Video | "तुषार कपूर से खास बातचीत" ["Exclusive Interview With Tusshar Kapoor [interviewees also include Siddhi Idnani and Sonia Rathee]"] (online video: 19 mins., 45 secs. → facing interviewees (from left to right): Siddhi Idnani, Tusshar Kapoor, and Sonia Rathee) (in Hindi). Archived from the original on May 23, 2025.
3. Tusshar Kapoor discusses his career, his films—Kapkapiii, Rang de Basanti, and Golmaal — his personal journey as a single father and his film Bachelor Dad, and he reflects on his father, Jeetendra. Sonia Rathee shares memories of working with Sidharth Shukla, both as an actor and as a person. Siddhi Idnani recounts a ghost story and a supernatural incident from the set of Kapkapiii.
4. Shukla, Sumit (June 6, 2025). "Sonia Rathee Exclusive: 'मेरी को-स्टार को दिखा भूत, खुश हूं अभी तक मेरा सामना नहीं हुआ ...'" ["My co-star saw a ghost; I'm glad I haven't had such an encounter yet ..."] (in Hindi). Archived from the original on June 15, 2025.
- Radio and Music (radioandmusic.com or RnM). Mumbai: Indiantelevision Dot Com Pvt Ltd. (IndianTelevision.com). OCLC 995235186 (all editions), OCLC 829755529 (all editions), OCLC 759928762 (all editions), 897359772, 920425983, 1317431548, 968999054, 1391795404, 1097091188, 1321821905, 926156223, 1306546988, 664611245, 1389628888, 971902163, 980549165.
1. RnM Team (7 July 2022). "Sonia Rathee Pulls off a Heist Drama in 'Chamkeela Chehra' With Badshah". Archived from the original on October 3, 2022.
2. RnM Team (28 September 2023). "King's Latest Love Anthem 'Sarkaare' From the Album New Life Is a Treat for Fans". Archived from the original on December 11, 2023.
See King – Indian singer and rapper (born 1995).
- Rajaraman, Kaushik (June 14, 2025). "I Look at the Script, Not My Character Alone: Sonia Rathee". DT Next. Chennai, India. Archived from the original on June 22, 2025.
- Rotten Tomatoes (2023). "Night Encounters". Rotten Tomatoes. Archived from the original on July 8, 2025. OCLC 48768329 (all editions).
- Scroll staff (October 8, 2022). "Tara vs Bilal Trailer: Harshvardhan Rane and Sonia Rathee Star in London-Set Romance". Scroll. Archived from the original on June 26, 2025.
- Singh, Jess (of Vancouver) (May 23, 2025). "Wamiqa Gabbi to Sonia Rathee Young Empowering Actresses". Urban Asian (Bollywood news blog). Oldsmar, Florida. Archived from the original on July 5, 2025.
- Sud, Kishori (May 18, 2021). "Relationships, Career: All You Need To Know About Sidharth Shukla's Broken Co-Star Sonia Rathee". HerZindagi. Noida, India. Archived from the original on June 24, 2021.

=== Primary references ===
- "How It All Started". International Iconic Awards. Archived from the original on July 8, 2025.
- "International Iconic Awards" – "Best Female Playback Singer Nominations". Instagram – internationaiconicawards. 28 February 2024.
