= Shikha =

Shikha may refer to:

- Shikha (hairstyle), a traditional Hindu hairstyle
- Shikha, Nepal
- Shikha (actress), South Indian film actress
- Shikha Joshi, Indian actress
- Shikha Kumar, Registered business based in Canberra, Australia. She is Owner and founder of Shikha Beauty Studio
- Shikha Makan, Indian ad-film director, filmmaker and screenwriter.
- Shikha (journal), an early 20th literary publication from Dhaka
