= Stardust Award for Superstar of Tomorrow – Male =

Indian acting award

The Stardust Superstar of Tomorrow - Male is an award given by a jury as part of the annual Stardust magazine. The award honours a star that has made an impact with their acting and represents new talent.

Here is a list of the award winners and the films for which they have won.

Year	Actor	Film
2003	Vivek Oberoi	Road & Company
2004	Shahid Kapoor	Ishq Vishk
2005	John Abraham	Paap
2006	Kunal Khemu	Kalyug
2007	Shiney Ahuja	Gangster
2008	Ranbir Kapoor	Saawariya
2009	Farhan Akhtar	Rock On
2010	Ranbir Kapoor	Wake Up Sid & Ajab Prem Ki Ghazab Kahani
2011	Ranveer Singh	Band Baaja Baaraat
2012	Ali Zafar	Mere Brother Ki Dulhan
2013	Arjun Kapoor	Ishaqzaade
2014	Tiger Shroff	Heropanti
2015	Sooraj Pancholi	Hero
2016	Harshvardhan Kapoor	Mirziya
2017	Harshvardhan Rane	Sanam Teri Kasam

== See also ==
- Stardust Awards
- Bollywood
- Cinema of India
