= Shadab Kamal =

Indian actor

- Born: 1987 (age 38–39); Kolkata, West Bengal
- Occupation: Actor
- Years active: 2011-present
- Notable work: B.A. Pass

Shadab Kamal is an Indian actor. He played the male lead in the 2012 film B.A. Pass, opposite Shilpa Shukla. He also acted in the 2018 film Gaon:The Village No More.

== Career ==
Indian actor Shadab Kamal began his career in 2011 with the movie Sugar Baby. Following which the actor went on to make his lead role debut in 2013 with Ajay Bahl's B.A. Pass which received critical acclaim and won the Best Film Award in the 'Indian competition' section at the 2012 Osian's Cinefan Festival of Asian and Arab Cinema. Shadab also received Best Actor award the event. The actor has since then appeared in movies such as Meeruthiya Gangsters (2015), Har Har Byomkesh (2015), and Gaon (2017). His 2018 release includes Gaon: The Village No More, directed by Gautam Singh. He acted in movie Upstarts which was released in 2019.

== Filmography ==
=== Films ===
Year	Title	Role	Notes
2011	Sugar Baby	Dr. Roy	Debut
2011	Chittagong	Makhan Ghosh	Debut in Bollywood
2011	B.A. Pass	Mukesh	Debut as Lead actor
2015	Meeruthiya Gangsters	Sunny	
2015	Har Har Byomkesh	Inspector Rathikanta Chowdhury	Bengali movie
2016	Robin Hood ke Pote	Macho	
2018	Gaon:The Village No More	Bharat	
2019	Upstarts	Vinay	

=== Web series ===
Year	Title	Role	Platform	Notes
2018	Akoori	Kaizad Irani	ZEE5	
