= Ray (TV series) =

2021 Indian series

- Poster
- Genre: Drama
- Based on: Literary works of Satyajit Ray by Satyajit Ray
- Written by: Niren Bhatt; Siraj Ahmed
- Directed by: Srijit Mukherji; Abhishek Chaubey; Vasan Bala
- Starring: Manoj Bajpayee; Gajraj Rao; Ali Fazal; Shweta Basu Prasad; Anindita Bose; Shruthy Menon; Kay Kay Menon; Bidita Bag; Dibyendu Bhattacharya; Harshvardhan Kapoor; Radhika Madan; Chandan Roy Sanyal
- Country of origin: India
- Original language: Hindi
- No. of seasons: 1
- No. of episodes: 4

Production
- Producer: Ajit Andhare
- Cinematography: Arkodeb Mukherjee; Swapnil S. Sonawane; Anuj Rakesh Dhawan; Eeshit Narain
- Production companies: Tipping Point Films; Colosceum Media

Original release
- Network: Netflix
- Release: 25 June 2021

Ray is an Indian drama anthology television series on Netflix created by Sayantan Mukherjee, based on the works of Satyajit Ray. The series is directed by Srijit Mukherji, Vasan Bala and Abhishek Chaubey. It is produced by Ajit Andhare, Tipping point and Viacom18 Studios. The series features Manoj Bajpayee, Ali Fazal, Harshvardhan Kapoor, and Kay Kay Menon. The series was released on 25 June 2021 on Netflix.

At the 2021 Filmfare OTT Awards, Ray received three nominations, including Best Web Original Film and Best Actor in a Web Original Film (Bajpayee), and won Best Supporting Actress in a Web Original Film (Madan).

== Synopsis ==
The four stories included as part of the anthology are:

- Forget Me Not by Srijit Mukherji: Based on Ray's short story Bipin Chowdhury'r Smritibhrom (transl. Bipin Chowdhury’s Memory Loss) It is about a successful entrepreneur, Ipsit Rama Nair (Ali Fazal) and an event, which changes the way his life was previously.
- Bahrupiya by Srijit Mukherji: Based on Ray's short story Bahurupi (transl. Polymorphous) It is about Indrashish (Kay Kay Menon), an office employee who gets hold of a valuable book on the art of prosthetics passed down to him by his grandmother.
- Hungama Hai Kyon Barpa by Abhishek Chaubey: Based on Ray's short story Barin Bhowmick-er Byaram (transl. Barin Bhowmick's Ailment) It is about two people - one being Musafir Ali (Manoj Bajpayee), a popular musician and singer and the other being Aslam Baig (Gajraj Rao), a wrestler turned sports journalist who meet on a train journey and a much earlier link between them reopens. The episode was written in Urdu by Niren Bhatt.
- Spotlight by Vasan Bala: Based on Ray's eponymous short story It revolves around a celebrated actor, Vikram "Vik" Arora (Harshvardhan Kapoor), who is known for a particular trademark look and a kind of existential crisis that he goes through when he meets a godlike figure known as Didi. It may be considered as a simulatenous adaptation of two most renowned films directed by Satyajit Ray viz., Mahapurush o Kapurush (Didi's character) and Nayak (Vik's character). Mahapurush was actually an adaptation of the Rajshekhar Basu's short story Birinchibaba. The episode was written by Niren Bhatt.

== Cast ==
The cast of the anthology includes the following:

Forget Me Not	Bahrupiya	Hungama Hai Kyon Barpa	Spotlight
Ali Fazal as Ipsit Rama Nair; Shweta Basu Prasad as Maggie; Anindita Bose as Rhea Sarfan; Shruthy Menon as Amala Nair; Gavin Methalaka as Gary	Kay Kay Menon as Indrashish Shah; Bidita Bag as Debashree Roy; Rajesh Sharma as Suresh Sharma; Dibyendu Bhattacharya as Peer Baba; Kharaj Mukherjee as Ghosh (Landlord); Alokananda Roy as Paarul (Indrashish's Grandmother)	Manoj Bajpayee as Musafir Ali; Gajraj Rao as Aslam Baig; Raghubir Yadav as Hakim Saab (Doctor); Manoj Pahwa as Owner of 'Rooh Safa' Shop	Harshvardhan Kapoor as Vikram "Vik" Arora; Radhika Madan as Didi; Akansha Ranjan Kapoor as Anuya; Chandan Roy Sanyal as Roby Ghosh; Vasan Bala as Film Director Ramen Malik (Cameo); Rajeev Masand as himself (Cameo); Niren Bhatt as Producer Kapoor (Cameo); Sayantan Mukherjee as Steve (Cameo)

== Release ==
The trailer of the series was released on 8 June 2021. The series released on 25 June 2021 on Netflix.

== Reception ==
The Daily Star wrote that "if not associated with Satyajit Ray's name, the series would most likely have garnered a better score for its entertainment value alone." Shreya Paul of Firstpost stated, "In an attempt to intellectualise Satyajit Ray through a contemporary lens, Netflix India's Ray completely alienates his humanism and effortlessness in portraying people’s vulnerabilities." Taisa Bhowal from India Today wrote, "There couldn't have been a better way to celebrate Satyajit Ray's birth anniversary than to introduce the prolific filmmaker-writer to an entire generation that is perhaps unversed with his legacy."

Avinash Singh of Live Hindustan praised the performance of the cast, stating "The length of 'Ray' is a bit jarring, but the endings of the stories are good and the actors are also able to hook you till the end of the story."

Hindustan Times's Rohan Naahar wrote "Manoj Bajpayee, Harsh Varrdhan Kapoor, Ali Fazal and Radhika Madan lead a handful of excellent performers in Netflix's irreverent but inconsistent anthology, based on Satyajit Ray's short stories."

== Accolades ==
Year	Award ceremony	Category	Nominee / work	Result	Ref.
2021	Filmfare OTT Awards	Best Web Original Film	Ray	Nominated	
2021	Filmfare OTT Awards	Best Actor in a Web Original Film	Manoj Bajpayee	Nominated	
2021	Filmfare OTT Awards	Best Supporting Actress in a Web Original Film	Radhika Madan	Won	
