= Bhavesh Joshi Superhero =

2018 Indian film by Vikramaditya Motwane

- Theatrical release poster
- Directed by: Vikramaditya Motwane
- Written by: Vikramaditya Motwane; Anurag Kashyap; Abhay Koranne
- Produced by: Vikas Bahl; Madhu Mantena; Anurag Kashyap
- Starring: Harshvardhan Kapoor; Nishikant Kamat; Priyanshu Painyuli; Ashish Verma
- Cinematography: Siddharth Diwan
- Edited by: Nitin Baid
- Music by: Amit Trivedi
- Production company: Phantom Films
- Distributed by: Reliance Entertainment; Eros International
- Release date: 1 June 2018 (India)
- Running time: 153 minutes
- Country: India
- Language: Hindi
- Budget: ₹21 crore
- Box office: ₹2.52 crore

Bhavesh Joshi Superhero is a 2018 Indian Hindi-language vigilante superhero action film directed by Vikramaditya Motwane under Phantom Films banner and co-written by Motwane along with Anurag Kashyap and Abhay Koranne. It stars Harshvardhan Kapoor in the lead role along with Priyanshu Painyuli, Ashish Verma and Nishikant Kamat in the supporting roles. This was Kamat's last appearance before his death on 17 August 2020.

Bhavesh Joshi Superhero released theatrically on 1 June 2018, and was also screened at Neuchatel Film Festival. The film received generally mixed reviews from critics and became a box-office bomb. However, the film has garnered a cult following based on the societal relevance and themes of the story. (Note: Attributed to multiple references:)

== Plot ==
Bhavesh Joshi, Sikandar "Siku" Khanna, and Rajat are three young men who meet at an anti-corruption rally and become friends. Bhavesh and Siku later create a YouTube channel called Insaaf TV, an online show dedicated to exposing wrongdoing and corruption in their city. Initially successful, the channel focuses on small-scale corruption in their neighbourhood, with Bhavesh and Siku wearing paper-bag masks while acting as vigilantes. After graduating, Siku begins working in the corporate sector and gradually loses interest in the channel, whose viewership declines until Rajat remains its only regular viewer. Bhavesh, however, becomes increasingly obsessed with eradicating corruption and continues his vigilante activities.

After receiving an email from an elderly resident about local water shortages, Bhavesh investigates and discovers that pipes supplying households have been fitted with additional pipes to siphon water into tankers, which then sell it back to residents who should receive it free from the municipality. He exposes the scheme on Insaaf TV, prompting Patil, leader of the water syndicate, to order a manhunt for the masked vigilante's identity.

Meanwhile, Siku's police clearance for a U.S. visa is delayed until he pays a bribe, despite having submitted all the required documents. When Bhavesh learns this, he angrily condemns government officials and politicians as corrupt and declares that they should be eradicated. Siku secretly records the argument, during which Bhavesh punches him and breaks his nose. In retaliation, Siku uploads the recording to Insaaf TV. The media subsequently brands Bhavesh a national fugitive. He is beaten by an angry mob, arrested and identified to Patil, who threatens him. While trying to prove his innocence and expose the truth, enraging Bhavesh is captured and beaten to death by Patil. The police tell Siku that Bhavesh died in a road accident and warn him not to investigate further.

Blaming himself for Bhavesh's death, Siku fakes his departure for the U.S. and hides in an abandoned hotel that once served as their gang's safe house. He adopts a mask and destroys Patil's pump house, where the siphoned water is stored. It is revealed that Patil is backed by local minister Rana. Siku acquires a motorcycle fitted with nitro cylinders and interrogates government officer Subhash Mhatre, who reveals that Patil killed by Bhavesh became enraged was investigating the illegal water operation. After being nearly defeated by Mhatre's men, Siku is rescued by Bhavesh's martial arts trainer. He uploads the interrogation to Justice TV, presenting himself as the supposedly living Bhavesh Joshi, and begins training in karate and eskrima.

The video goes viral and Patil is arrested, but Mhatre is found dead and the police declare it a committed suicide. With insufficient evidence, Patil is released. Siku infiltrates the dance bar he frequents and plants a bug in his VIP room, learning that Patil plans to destroy water pipes across the city and create a severe drinking-water shortage. Inspector Sunil Jadhav later discovers Siku at the bar, but Siku escapes after a motorcycle chase. Patil retaliates by killing a constable and arranging for the police to frame Bhavesh for the murder.

Rajat, suspicious of Insaaf TV after Bhavesh's death, follows Siku's girlfriend Sneha and discovers that Siku is still in India and has assumed Bhavesh's identity. Confronting him, Rajat accuses him of wanting to be a hero like the comic-book characters they once read. Siku replies that he does not want to be a hero; he simply refuses to let Bhavesh's work have been in vain.

Siku attacks Patil's men as they prepare to destroy the city's water pipes, but is defeated and unmasked. The pipes are nevertheless destroyed, leaving him wounded. Rana confronts Siku and compares him to Icarus, who flew too close to the sun and fell to his death. Rana declares himself the sun and orders Jadhav to kill Siku and dispose of his body in the water, thereby framing Bhavesh for the attack on Mumbai. Reluctant to kill him, Jadhav shoots Siku in the shoulder instead. Rajat secretly records the incident, rescues Siku from the water and takes him to hospital under the name Mohan Kher.

As Siku recovers, Mumbai faces a severe water crisis. Rana offers the Chief Minister free water in exchange for control of all future water-related contracts, making both men popular with the public. Rajat sends the recording to Jadhav, who reopens the investigation into the blast. As the truth emerges, Patil is arrested and put on trial, while Bhavesh's cause inspires widespread protests. Siku is presumed dead and becomes a martyr against corruption, so he allows Sneha to grieve rather than reveal that he survived. Later, Siku infiltrates Rana's home. After discovering his unconscious bodyguards, Rana encounters Siku on the balcony, now operating under his own identity as "Insaaf-Man", a comic-book superhero name invented by Rajat.

== Cast ==
- Harshvardhan Kapoor as Sikander "Siku" Khanna / Bhavesh Joshi / Insaaf-Man
- Priyanshu Painyuli as Bhavesh Joshi
- Ashish Verma as Rajat
- Shreiyah Sabharwal as Sneha
- Pratap Phad as Patil
- Pabitra Rabha as Thapa
- Chinmay Mandlekar as Sunil Jadhav (credited as Chinmayee Mandlekar)
- Nishikant Kamat as Rana
- Hrishikesh Joshi as Subhash Mhatre
- Dipesh K. Shrestha as Taja Bhau

Additionally, Arjun Kapoor, Sharib Hashmi, Shibani Dandekar, and Anusha Dandekar made special appearance in the song "Chavanprash."

== Production ==
=== Development ===
The film was officially announced sometime in April 2014. The title of the film was said to be Bhavesh Joshi.

=== Casting ===
The makers of the film initially decided on Imran Khan for the lead. The role then went to Sidharth Malhotra, but he was eventually replaced by Harshvardhan Kapoor due to frequent delays in the film's pre-production schedule.

=== Filming ===
The principal photography of the film commenced in July 2016. The film shooting ended on 30 May 2017.

== Music ==
Bhavesh Joshi Superhero

Soundtrack album by Amit Trivedi
- Released: 23 May 2018
- Recorded: 2017–2018
- Genre: Feature film soundtrack
- Length: 16:22
- Language: Hindi
- Label: Eros Music

Amit Trivedi chronology
Raid (2018)	Bhavesh Joshi Superhero (2018)	Blackmail (2018)
External audio
- Audio Jukebox on YouTube

The music of the film was composed by Amit Trivedi while the lyrics were written by Amitabh Bhattacharya, Anurag Kashyap, Babu Haabi and Naezy. The first song of the film to be released was Hum Hain Insaaf which is sung by Babu Haabi and Naezy and was released on 12 May 2018. The second song of the film titled as Chavanprash featuring Arjun Kapoor, sung by Divya Kumar, Pragati Joshi and Arohi Mhatre, was re-released on 16 May 2018. The soundtrack of the film was released on 23 May 2018 by Eros Music.

Track listing
No.	Title	Lyrics	Singer(s)	Length
1.	"Hum Hain Insaaf"	Anurag Kashyap, Babu Haabi, Naezy	Babu Haabi, Naezy	03:04
2.	"Chavanprash"	Amitabh Bhattacharya	Divya Kumar, Pragati Joshi, Arohi Mhatre	04:21
3.	"Tafreeh"	Amitabh Bhattacharya	Amit Trivedi	04:30
4.	"Qasam Kha Li"	Amitabh Bhattacharya	Papon	04:27
Total length:				16:22

== Release ==
The film was released theatrically on 1 June 2018. It was also officially selected for the 2018 Bucheon International Fantastic Film Festival.

=== Home media ===
The film premiered on Netflix on 16 August 2018.

== Reception ==
=== Critical response ===
On the review aggregator website Rotten Tomatoes, 50% of 14 critics' reviews are positive, with an average rating of 5.4/10.

Neil Soans of The Times of India gave 3.5/5 stars and wrote "Vikramaditya Motwane’s take on the superhero genre with gritty, realistic action and a masked vigilante’s story that hits close to home, is worth a look". Rohit Vats of Hindustan Times gave 3/5 stars and wrote "Harshvardhan Kapoor’s film is darker than any other Hindi superhero film you have seen. It’s earnest and deals with the idea of vigilante justice in its raw form". Raja Sen of NDTV gave 2.5/5 stars and wrote "The vigilante film is well meaning and has good actors, but it is ultimately a boring effort". Rajeev Masand of News18 gave 2.5/5 stars and wrote "Bhavesh Joshi Superhero is an impressive, admirable attempt at creating a vulnerable middle-class superhero in the real world, committed to tackling everyday challenges faced by the ordinary citizen. But it’s also bloated and indulgent, and that comes in the way of Motwane realizing the full extent of his vision". Shubhra Gupta of The Indian Express gave 2/5 stars and wrote "The film clearly intends to be dark, edgy and cool. Trouble is, it spends too much of its time underlining its purpose, even getting a character to say these three adjectives".
