= Thar (film) =

2022 film by Raj Singh Chaudhary

- Official release poster
- Directed by: Raj Singh Chaudhary
- Written by: Raj Singh Chaudhary
- Produced by: Anil Kapoor; Harsh Varrdhan Kapoor
- Starring: Anil Kapoor; Harsh Varrdhan Kapoor; Fatima Sana Shaikh; Mukti Mohan
- Cinematography: Shreya Dev Dube
- Edited by: Aarti Bajaj
- Music by: Ajay Jayanthi
- Production companies: Anil Kapoor Films & Communication Network
- Distributed by: Netflix
- Release date: 6 May 2022
- Running time: 108 minutes
- Country: India
- Language: Hindi

Thar is a 2022 Indian Hindi-language neo-Western action thriller film written and directed by Raj Singh Chaudhary and produced by Anil Kapoor and Harsh Varrdhan Kapoor. Set in the 80s, Thar follows a city man who moves to a village located in the wilderness for some exploration work, but there is more to him than meets the eye. It stars Anil Kapoor, Harsh Varrdhan Kapoor, Fatima Sana Shaikh and Mukti Mohan.

It released on Netflix on 6 May 2022, and received mixed to positive reviews from critics, who praised the direction, cinematography, performances, dialogues, background score, and its homages to the Western genre, though some criticized its predictable story, screenplay, and editing.

At the 2022 Filmfare OTT Awards, Thar received 5 nominations, including Best Web Original Film, Best Actor in a Web Original Film (Harsh Varrdhan) and Best Actress in a Web Original Film (Shaikh), and won Best Supporting Actor in a Web Original Film (Anil).

== Plot ==
In 1985, Siddharth Kumar (Harshvardan Kapoor), a mysterious antiques dealer, travels through Munabao, a remote Rajasthani village situated in the Thar Desert near the Pakistan border, that has been rocked recently by violent killings. As Inspector of Munabao, Surekha Singh (Anil Kapoor) investigates these killings, when he crosses paths with Siddharth. During his investigation, Surekha comes to a conclusion that it was the dacoits who mercilessly killed a family for drugs not for the money collected for dowry as that family's only survivor - the daughter - claims. Someone kills Suwa (Akkshay Gunaawat), a villager, and hangs his body on a tree. Many policemen believe it was the same gang of dacoits, but Surekha believes it is not the case considering Suva was tortured and mutilated before being hanged.

Panna (Jitendra Joshi), frustrated because of Chetna's (Fatima Sana Shaikh) infertility, does not like Siddharth's frequent visit to their home and consequently beats Chetna. Siddharth finds friends of Suwa - Panna, Dhanna (Sanjay Bishnoi) and Kanwar (Sanjay Dadhich). He asks Panna and Kanwar for a job to transport antiques to Delhi. On the way Siddharth abducts them and keeps them in a fort outside of the village. He comes back to the village and sleeps with Chetna. As he intends to leave the village the next day, Chetna plans to leave with him. Dhanna's wife suspects something is wrong and reports to Surekha. While investigating further about Siddharth, it is then revealed that his wife was raped, similarly tortured and mutilated by these friends in Delhi and this entire story of murdering them all was Siddharth's revenge.

When Surekha is going to the fort to arrest Siddharth, he is attacked by the gang of dacoits in which he successfully kills them all and reaches the fort. Meanwhile, Siddharth tells everything to Chetna and burns her husband Panna in front of her. When Surekha asks him to surrender, Chetna kills Siddharth. After 6 months we see Chetna pregnant with Siddharth's child and Surekha recovering from his injuries.

== Cast ==
- Anil Kapoor as Inspector Surekha Singh
- Harsh Varrdhan Kapoor as Siddharth Kumar
- Fatima Sana Shaikh as Chetna
- Mukti Mohan as Gauri
- Jitendra Joshi as Panna
- Akshay Oberoi as Arjun Singh
- Satish Kaushik as Bhure
- Rahul Singh as Dacoit Hanif Khan
- Mandana Karimi as Cheryl, Siddharth's deceased wife

== Reception ==
On the review aggregator website Rotten Tomatoes, 63% of 24 critics' reviews are positive, with an average rating of 6/10.

Pooja Biraia Jaiswal of The Week gave the film a rating of 3.5/5 stars and wrote, "Thar's gripping atmospherics, set in 1985, is captured evocatively by Shreya Dev Dube, as the narrative unfolds in the desert's grim expanse." Taran Adarsh of Bollywood Hungama gave the film a rating of 3.5/5 stars and wrote, "Thar is a surprise of the season and worth watching for its plot, direction, music score and the never before seen locales of Rajasthan." Peter Bradshaw of The Guardian gave the film a rating of 3/5 stars and wrote, "There are hints of Sergio Leone and Cormac McCarthy in this Rajasthan-set mystery starring the actor and his son." Bharathi Pradhan of Lehren gave the film a rating of 3/5 stars and stated, "Cruel & Compelling." Renuka Vyavahare of The Times Of India gave the film a rating of 3/5 stars and wrote, "Anil Kapoor's film choices are only getting better and bolder with age. Be it Thar or AK vs AK, he's showing the millennials and OTT clan what a certified movie star is made of". Reubyn Coutinho of Netflix Junkie wrote, "Shots of the sprawling desert landscape give one that classic western feel that can transport them back in time to the classic westerns or even the spaghetti westerns." Prateek Sur of Outlook India gave the film a rating of 3/5 stars and wrote, "While Chaudhary has made a great attempt at bringing forth a dark neo-noir thriller, but in his haste to keep it under two hours, he has just squandered a great plot at hand."

Anna M. M. Vetticad of Firstpost gave the film a rating of 2.75/5 stars and wrote, "Anil Kapoor's quiet charisma and innate appeal keep the film going even when its writing enters shallow waters." Saibal Chatterjee of NDTV gave the film a rating of 2.5/5 stars and wrote, "Kapoor Sr delivers a restrained performance, and Kapoor Jr finds himself tackling a role that appears to be right up his narrow alley. Fatima Sana Shaikh is sultry and smouldering by turns." Shubhra Gupta of The Indian Express gave the film a rating of 2.5/5 stars and wrote, "This is one of those films where the setting is the real hero-- the 'Marusthal' (desert) stretching as far as the eye can see, crumbling forts, bare trees providing meagre shade, implacable, hard beauty." Sukanya Verma of Rediff gave the film a rating of 2.5/5 stars and wrote "Thar fails to ignite any excitement on screen." Avinash Lohana of Pinkvilla gave the film a rating of 2.5/5 stars and wrote, "Thar had immense potential and manages to retain a lot of it too, but what disappoints is the lack of enough twists, predictable turns and dispensable additions to the story." Gautaman Bhaskaran of News18 gave the film a rating of 2/5 stars and wrote, "Anil Kapoor as the cop frustrated that he has not been able to rise in the ranks, does a decent job. But there is not much coming from Kapoor's son." Soumya Srivastava of The Hindustan Times stated, "Anil Kapoor outshines son Harsh Varrdhan Kapoor in the film, which begins as a Western set in Rajasthan but soon descends into torture porn genre."

== Accolades ==
Year	Award ceremony	Category	Nominee / work	Result	Ref.
2022	Filmfare OTT Awards	Best Web Original Film	Thar	Nominated	
2022	Filmfare OTT Awards	Best Actor in a Web Original Film	Harsh Varrdhan Kapoor	Nominated	
2022	Filmfare OTT Awards	Best Actress in a Web Original Film	Fatima Sana Shaikh	Nominated	
2022	Filmfare OTT Awards	Best Supporting Actor in a Web Original Film	Anil Kapoor	Won	
2022	Filmfare OTT Awards	Best Supporting Actor in a Web Original Film	Jitendra Joshi	Nominated	
