= Dibyendu Bhattacharya =

Indian actor (born 1975)

- Born: 11 November 1975 (age 51); Kolkata, West Bengal, India
- Education: National School of Drama
- Occupation: Actor
- Years active: 2001–present
- Spouse: Richa Bhattacharya
- Children: 2

Dibyendu Bhattacharya (born 11 November 1975) is an Indian actor known for his work in Hindi and Bengali cinema. He is also known for his role as Yeda Yakub Khan In The 2004 Docudrama Black Friday Directed By Anurag Kashyap.

== Filmography ==
=== Film ===
Year	Title	Role	Notes
2001	Monsoon Wedding	Lottery	
2001	An employee	Prashant Kumbhar	
2004	Maqbool	Shooter	
2004	Ab Tak Chhappan	Zameer's Gang	
2004	Black Friday	Yeda Yakub	
2007	Dhan Dhana Dhan Goal	Debashis	
2007	Fear		
2009	Dev D.	Chunnilal	
2008	Hulla	Ronnie Gonsalves	
2010	Soul of Sand	Bhanu Kumar	
2012	Chittagong	Ambika Chakrabarty	
2013	Lootera	-	
2013	B.A. Pass	Johnny	
2015	Guddu Rangeela	Bangali	
2017	Jole Jongole	Debashis	Bengali film
2018	Pari	Sahu	
2019	Gaon	Bellu	
2019	Section 375	Medical Examiner	
2022	Looop Lapeta	Victor	
2022	Khuda Haafiz: Chapter II Agni Pariksha	Rashid Qasai	
2022	Code Name: Tiranga	Ajay Baksi	
2022	Chakda 'Xpress	N/A	Unreleased
2023	Mission Raniganj	D.Sen	
2024	Bonbibi	Jahangir	Bengali film
2025	Fateh	Nishit Biswas	
2025	Kapkapiii	Jamil	
2025	The Bengal Files	Rajendra Lal Roychowdhary	
2026	Prince: Once Upon a Time in Dhaka	Afghani Pathan	Bangladeshi film
2026	Alpha	Dr. John Verghese	

=== Television ===
Year	Title	Role	Language	Notes
2013	24	Raja	Hindi	Colors TV
2018	Sacred Games	Momin	Hindi	Netflix
2018	Selection Day	Gulshan	Hindi	Netflix
2018	Dhanbad Blues	Tiwari	Bengali	Hoichoi
2019	Criminal Justice	Layak	Hindi	Disney Plus Hotstar
2019	Delhi Crime		Hindi	Netflix
2019	Parchhayee	Shridhar	Hindi	ZEE5
2019	Thinkistan	Arnab	Hindi	MX Player
2020	Jamtara - Sabka Number Ayega	Inspector Biswa Pathak	Hindi	Netflix
2020	Laalbazaar	Abbas Ghazi	Bengali	ZEE5
2020	Undekhi	DySP Barun Ghosh	Hindi	SonyLIV
2020	The Gone Game	Subhash Chaudhary	Hindi	Voot
2020	Mirzapur Season 2	Doctor	Hindi	Amazon Prime Video
2021	Ray	Peer Baba	Hindi	Netflix
2021	Maharani Season 2	Martin Gilbert Ekka	Hindi	SonyLIV
2022	Rocket Boys	Prof. Mehdi Raza	Hindi	SonyLIV
2022	Aar Ya Paar	Pullapa	Hindi	Disney Plus Hotstar
2023	The Railway Men	Kamruddin	Hindi	Netflix
2024	Poacher	Neel Banerjee	Malayalam	Prime Video
2024	IC 814: The Kandahar Hijack	Abhijeet Kumar	Hindi	Netflix
2024	Shekhar Home	Debnath "Debu" Chaudhary	Hindi	JioCinema
2026	Maamla Legal Hai	Kailash Shubhkela / Sajjan Patnaik	Hindi	Netflix
2026	Raakh	SP Indranil Hajra	Hindi	Prime Video
