= Tara vs Bilal =

2022 Indian film by Samar Iqbal

Tara Vs Bilal
- Theatrical release poster
- Directed by: Samar Iqbal
- Written by: Sanyukta Shaikh
- Produced by: Bhushan Kumar; Krishan Kumar; John Abraham
- Starring: Harshvardhan Rane; Sonia Rathee
- Cinematography: Amarjeet Singh
- Edited by: Dipika Kalra
- Music by: Manan Bhardwaj
- Production companies: T-Series Films; JA Entertainment; TVB Films
- Distributed by: AA Films
- Release date: 28 October 2022
- Running time: 126 minutes
- Country: India
- Language: Hindi

Tara Vs Bilal is a 2022 Indian Hindi-language romantic comedy film directed by Samar Iqbal, starring Harshvardhan Rane and Sonia Rathee. The story revolves around two leading characters who enter a fake marriage and later fall in love.

Tara Vs Bilal was released on 28 October 2022.

== Cast ==
- Harshvardhan Rane as Advocate Bilal "Billu" Khan
- Sonia Rathee as Tara Kaul Sharma
- Sarmard Varraich as Karan Sharma
- Raheem Mir as Ritesh Shah (Ritz)
- Pranay Manchanda as Dr. Jignesh "Jiggy"
- Nikki Aneja Walia as Daisy Aunty
- Shammi Aulakh as Imran Khan, Bilal's father
- Mona Ambegaonkar as Bilal's mother
- Shagufta Ali as Bilal's aunt (Mausi)
- Deepika Amin as Bilal's aunt (Phuphi)

== Soundtrack ==
Tara Vs Bilal

Soundtrack album by Manan Bhardwaj
- Released: 4 November 2022
- Genre: Feature film soundtrack
- Length: 14:27
- Label: T-Series

Official audio
- Tara Vs Bilal- Full Album on YouTube

The music was composed and lyrics written by Manan Bhardwaj.

Track listing
No.	Title	Singer(s)	Length
1.	"Teri Ho Gayi"	Master Saleem, Faridkot	3:24
2.	"Nichod Dunga"	Manan Bhardwaj	2:58
3.	"Saiyaan Ji"	Romy, Manan Bhardwaj	4:03
4.	"Sau Rab Di"	Jubin Nautiyal, Manan Bhardwaj, Purvashi Grover	4:02
Total length:			14:27

== Production ==
The principal photography of the film started in mid-October 2021.

== Reception ==
The film received mixed reviews from critics, with praise for its lead performances and music but criticism for its formulaic plot and uneven execution. The Times of India rated it 2.5/5, calling it a “sweet and simple love story” with strong chemistry between Harshvardhan Rane and Sonia Rathee, though noting it “barely a compelling romantic drama” due to its predictable narrative.

Fenil Seta of Filmy Fenil gave it 3/5, commending Rane’s “terrific” performance, Rathee’s confident debut, and the sensitive handling of an LGBTQ subplot, but criticized silly plot points and weak initial portions.

The film’s music, composed by Manan Bhardwaj, was well-received, with Teri Ho Gayi noted for enhancing the lead couple’s romance.

The film underperformed at the box office, with Bollywood Hungama reporting negligible collections, including ₹11,750 on its opening day.
