= Charlie Chopra & the Mystery of Solang Valley =

Indian Hindi-language series directed by Vishal Bhardwaj

- Official Poster
- Genre: Mystery
- Based on: The Sittaford Mystery by Agatha Christie
- Written by: Vishal Bhardwaj; Jyotsna Hariharan; Anjum Rajabali
- Directed by: Vishal Bhardwaj
- Starring: Wamiqa Gabbi; Priyanshu Painyuli; Naseeruddin Shah; Lara Dutta; Neena Gupta; Ratna Pathak Shah; Gulshan Grover; Paoli Dam
- Music by: Vishal Bhardwaj
- Country of origin: India
- Original language: Hindi
- No. of seasons: 1
- No. of episodes: 6

Production
- Producers: Priti Shahani; Vishal Bhardwaj
- Cinematography: Tassaduq Hussain
- Production companies: Vishal Bhardwaj Pictures; Tusk Tale Films; Agatha Christie Limited

Original release
- Network: SonyLIV
- Release: 30 June – 27 September 2023

Charlie Chopra & the Mystery of Solang Valley is a 2023 Indian Hindi-language mystery thriller television series on SonyLIV, directed by Vishal Bhardwaj. The show is based on a crime mystery novel by Agatha Christie, The Sittaford Mystery. It was produced by Vishal Bhardwaj Pictures, Priti Sahani, and Agatha Christie Limited.

The series stars Wamiqa Gabbi, Priyanshu Painyuli, Naseeruddin Shah, Lara Dutta, Neena Gupta, Ratna Pathak Shah,Gulshan Grover, Paoli Dam, Vivaan Shah, Imaad Shah with an ensemble cast The pilot episode of the series released on SonyLIV, on 30 June 2023. The remaining episodes premiered on SonyLIV on 27 September 2023

== Synopsis ==
When her quiet, timid fiancé, Jimmy Nautiyal, gets implicated as the prime suspect in the murder of his uncle, Charulata ‘Charlie’ Chopra rushes to his aid. Upon arriving at his family home in Solang Valley, Charlie uncovers the strange circumstances of the murder and soon starts unravelling the stories of this peaceful little town - long buried family secrets, runaway fugitives, friendship, betrayal, love, and greed. But as she inches closer and closer to the truth that someone would rather keep buried, the next person to lose their life might very well be Charlie herself.

== Cast ==
- Wamiqa Gabbi as Charulatha "Charlie" Chopra
- Priyanshu Painyuli as Sitaram Bisht
- Naseeruddin Shah as Dr. Rai
- Lara Dutta as Wilayat Hussain
- Neena Gupta as Dr. Janki Rawat
  - Pankhuri Gidwani as Young Janki
- Ratna Pathak Shah as Ms. Bharucha
- Gulshan Grover as Brigadier Meherbaan Singh Rawat
  - Sumit Keshri as Young Meherbaan Singh Rawat
- Paoli Dam as Saloni Debral
- Chandan Roy Sanyal as Manas Debral
- Imaaduddin Shah as Billu Nautiyal
- Vivaan Shah as Jimmy Nautiyal
- Lalit Parimoo as Prof. Mohan Rawat
- Richa Chadha as Dolly Chopra, Charlie's mother (Cameo appearance)
- Pulkit Makol as Varun Rawat
- Shataf Figar as Ajay Thakur
- Baharul Islam as Colonel Barua
- Amitabh Bhatacharjee as Mr. Negi
- Damini Basu as Mrs. Negi
- Ashique Hussain as Hanif
- Heeba Shah as Hanif's wife
- Monnica Rae Laher as Lady Rose
- Ghanshyam Garg as Inspector Narayan
- Emily Ackland as Nikki
- Bhagyashree Tarke as Wasima Hussain
- Karan Nagar as Ronny
