= B.A. Pass =

2012 film by Ajay Bahl

- Theatrical release poster
- Directed by: Ajay Bahl
- Written by: Ritesh Shah
- Based on: The Railway Aunty by Mohan Sikka
- Produced by: Narendra Singh; Ajay Bahl
- Starring: Shilpa Shukla; Shadab Kamal; Rajesh Sharma; Dibyendu Bhattacharya
- Cinematography: Ajay Bahl
- Edited by: Pravin Angre
- Music by: Alokananda Dasgupta
- Production company: Filmybox n Tonga Talkies
- Distributed by: VIP Films
- Release dates: 30 August 2012 (Montreal World Film Festival); 2 August 2013 (India)
- Running time: 95 minutes
- Country: India
- Language: Hindi
- Box office: ₹284 million

B.A. Pass is a 2012 Indian Hindi-language neo noir erotic thriller film, produced by Narendra Singh, directed by Ajay Bahl, and starring Shilpa Shukla, Shadab Kamal, Rajesh Sharma, and Dibyendu Bhattacharya in lead roles. It is distributed by Bharat Shah's VIP films banner. The film is based on the 2009 short story "The Railway Aunty" by Mohan Sikka.

The movie was earlier scheduled to be released on 12 July 2013 but was eventually released on 2 August 2013 to avoid clashing with the major release, Bhaag Milkha Bhaag. Upon release, the movie received universal critical acclaim.

Two sequels have been released, namely B.A. Pass 2 (in 2017, originally M.A. Pass) directed by Shadab Khan and B.A. Pass 3 (2021) directed by Narendra Singh.

== Plot ==
The story begins with the death of the parents of Mukesh, a teenager who has just finished high school. Mukesh is put into the care of an unfriendly aunt. He struggles to get along with his aunt's family who refuses to provide him with any money. As he struggles to study in the first year of his BA, he also worries for his two sisters who have been sent to live in an orphanage for girls. Mukesh bonds with an undertaker named Johnny over their mutual love of chess. Johnny has a brother in Mauritius who has invited him to live there, but Johnny has no money to get to Mauritius. He tells Mukesh of his dream to leave the country one day.

One day Mukesh is introduced to a cougar named Sarika at a kitty party in his aunt's house. He happens to go to Sarika's home to get apples, only to be seduced by her. She pays him for his services as a gigolo and the two routinely have sex. Sarika introduces Mukesh to many older women who finally make him a male prostitute. On one occasion, Sarika's husband catches her and Mukesh trying to have sex. Her husband then slaps and rapes Sarika in front of Mukesh to show who wears the pants in the house. He lies to Mukesh's aunt that Mukesh had been seeking a loan from Sarika, and tried to kiss her. This makes Mukesh's aunt throw him out of her house.

Mukesh comes to Johnny's house and stays with him. Sarika refuses to stay in touch with him, and makes sure that none of her female friends who were Mukesh's clients entertain him. Frustrated, Mukesh asks Johnny to visit Sarika and ask for the money she owes him. Johnny returns to say that she refused to pay and threatened to call the police.

Meanwhile, M's sisters are having a hard time at the orphanage. Out of desperation, Mukesh decides to offer his sexual services to men. In the process, he is raped and beaten up by a gang.

Feeling betrayed by Sarika and holding her responsible for his misery, Mukesh barges into her home and demands the money that is due to him. Sarika says she gave the money to Johnny, but Mukesh refuses to believe her. Ashok arrives suddenly, and to prove her innocence, Sarika makes an unsuspecting Mukesh stab her lightly to make it look like he attacked her. In a state of shock, Mukesh stabs her three more times till she dies, in front of Ashok. Mukesh then runs away to Johnny's house.

Shortly, he receives a call from his sisters who have run away from the orphanage, and need his help. Mukesh realises that Sarika told the truth, and Johnny has packed up and left the country with his money. He receives another call from his sisters to pick them up at the railway station. Mukesh tells them to wait till he arrives. On his way, he is seen by the police who chase him to the top of a building's balcony. As the police point a gun at him, he gets yet another call from his sisters. Mukesh, now trapped on the balcony, jumps to his death.

== Cast ==
- Shilpa Shukla as Sarika Khanna
- Shadab Kamal as Mukesh
- Rajesh Sharma as Ashok Khanna
- Deepti Naval as Mrs.Suhasini
- Vicky Daware as smuggler
- Dibyendu Bhattacharya as Johnny
- Vanya Joshi
- Shikha Joshi
- Vijay Kaushik as Phupha ji
- Kshitij Theatre Group
- Anula Navlekar as Chotti
- Happy Ranjit as Phd
- Amit Sharma as Amit
- Geeta Agarwal Sharma as Bua Ji
- Raveena Sharma as Sonu

== Production ==
The screenplay was written by Ritesh Shah, based on a short story, The Railway Aunty by Mohan Sikka, published in 2009 anthology, Delhi Noir edited by Hirsh Sawhney.

Director Ajay Bahl had two choices for the lead role, Richa Chadda and Shilpa Shukla, whose work he had liked in Khamosh Pani. Shukla had recently done Chak De! India, and since he didn't want to go with a known face, he opted for Chaddha. However, when she was asked to act in Gangs of Wasseypur, he then suggested that she do that film instead of B.A. Pass, and cast Shukla in the lead role.

This film was mostly shot in the city of Delhi. It was shot by director-cinematographer Ajay Bahl in the bylanes of Paharganj, Barakhamba Road and the Sarai Rohilla area of Delhi, and the principal photography which started in July 2011 in Delhi, after two months devoted to look test, was completed in January 2012.

The background score was composed by Alokananda Dasgupta.

== Release ==
The film was premiered at the 2012 Osian's Cinefan Festival of Asian and Arab Cinema in Delhi, it was commercially released all over India on 2 August 2013.

== Accolades ==
At the 2012 Osian's Cinefan Festival of Asian and Arab Cinema, the film won the Best Film Award in the 'Indian competition' section, while debutante Shadab Kamal won the Best Actor award. Later at the 2012 Montreal World Film Festival the film was part of the 'First Films World Competition', where it was nominated for the Golden Zenith for the Best First Fiction Feature Film.

In January 2013, at the first South Asian Film Festival held in Paris it won The Prix Du Public (voted best film by the French Audience).

- 2014 Filmfare Awards: Best Actress (Critics) for B.A. Pass – Shilpa Shukla
- 2014 Screen Awards: Best Actor in a Negative Role (Female) for B.A. Pass – Shilpa Shukla
- 2014 Screen Awards: Screen Award for Best Story for B.A. Pass – Mohan Sikka

== Bibliography ==
- Delhi Noir (Akashic noir series), ed. Hirsh Sawhney. Akashic Books, 2009. ISBN 193335478X.
