= Murder in Mahim =

- Genre: Crime; Drama
- Based on: Murder in Mahim by Jerry Pinto
- Written by: Mustafa Neemuchwala; Udai Singh Pawar
- Directed by: Raj Acharya
- Starring: Vijay Raaz; Ashutosh Rana; Shivani Raghuvanshi; Shivaji Satam
- Country of origin: India
- Original language: Hindi
- No. of seasons: 1
- No. of episodes: 8

Production
- Executive producers: Anjali Bhushan; Rajnish Lall; Mark Benjamin
- Producer: Ajit Andhare
- Editor: Zubin Sheikh
- Production companies: Tipping Point Films; Jigsaw Pictures Productions

Original release
- Network: JioCinema
- Release: 10 May 2024

Murder In Mahim is a 2024 Indian Hindi-language crime drama TV series on JioCinema written by Mustafa Neemuchwala and Udai Singh Pawar and directed by Raj Acharya. It stars Vijay Raaz, Ashutosh Rana, Shivani Raghuvanshi, Nishant Kkhanduja and Shivaji Satam. It was released on 10 May 2024.

== Plot summary ==
Police officer Shivajirao Jende and his friend, retired journalist Peter Fernandes, dive into a murder case in Mumbai's darker side. In a gripping story based on Jerry Pinto's highly praised book, they discover hidden truths about longing, avarice, hopelessness, and also face the ghosts of their estranged friendship.

== Cast ==
- Vijay Raaz as Shivajirao Jende
- Ashutosh Rana as Peter Fernandes
- Shivani Raghuvanshi as Firdaus Rabbani
- Shivaji Satam as Dullar Jende ( Shivajirao's father)
- Divya Jagdale as Millie
- Smita Tambe as Kalpana Jende
- Rajesh Khattar as Leslie
- Sonal Jha as Shaheen
- Benafsha Soonawalla as Rehana
- Rohan Verma as Sunil
- Ashitosh Gaikwad as Unit
- Nishant Kkhanduja as Viral
- Bharat Ganeshpure as Durra

== Release ==
Murder in Mahim was released on JioCinema on 10 May 2024.

== Reception ==
Yatamanyu Narain of News18 rated the series 4 stars and penned "‘Murder In Mahim’ transcends the boundaries of a mere investigation, evolving into a searing portrayal of a world tainted by ignorance and intolerance—a poignant reminder of the enduring struggles faced by those battling to find acceptance and justice in a realm engulfed by shadows. This coming-of-age thriller, while not devoid of flaws, makes for an engaging and thought-provoking watch.

Shubhra Gupta of The Indian Express rated the film 2.5 stars and wrote "The eight-part series focuses on regular people (and their families) to be found in modest dwellings and crowded police thanas, through a sharp look at the LGBTQ community".

Rahul Desai of Film Companion wrote "Murder in Mahim is not unwatchable, but it fumbles the fundamentals of its genre. It mistakes slow-burning for slow. If it were an Indian batsman, it would be criticized for its strike rate – in Test cricket no less."

Abhishek Srivastava from The Times of India rated 3.5 stars stating, "Beyond its suspenseful plot, 'Murder in Mahim' offers a commentary on the challenges faced by the LGBTQ community."

Deepa Gahlot from Rediff.com rated 3/5 and stated "Among the many reasons to watch Murder In Mahim is that it may be a chance to wipe out -- if it is achievable by a Web series -- the air of judgment towards those who do not conform to the majority's idea of normal."

Shilajit Mitra or The Hindu said in his review that "This (mostly) faithful adaptation of Jerry Pinto's novel lacks the subtlety and craft of a really great crime show."

Nandini Ramnath of Scroll.in stated in her review that "Murder in Mahim can never escape the suspicion that it would have been more effective as a movie. Overloaded with family bonding scenes and slippery on the procedural aspect, the show steadies itself through its unwavering focus on the murderous consequences of homophobia."

Troy Ribeiro of The Free Press Journal rated 3.5/5 and said that "The series challenges societal norms and provokes conversations about acceptance, justice, and the complexities of human nature."

Rishil Jogani from Pinkvilla rated 3.5 out of 5 and stated that "Murder In Mahim is more than just an investigation drama. It is layered and manages to ask some very tough questions. It also makes you self-introspect."

Soumyabrata Gupta of Times Now rated 3/5 and wrote "Raj Acharya directs Murder In Mahim, spotlighting the riveting portrayals of Ashutosh Rana and Vijay Raaz. The film delves into the chilling murders at Mahim railway station, exploring the perilous trend of honey-trapping within the LGBTQIA+ community. It blends elements of investigation and drama to illuminate this disturbing phenomenon."
