= Mirzya (film) =

2016 film by Rakeysh Omprakash Mehra

- Theatrical release poster
- Directed by: Rakeysh Omprakash Mehra
- Written by: Gulzar
- Based on: Mirza Sahiban by Pilu
- Produced by: Rohit Khattar; Rakeysh Omprakash Mehra; P. S. Bharathi; Rajiv Tandon
- Starring: Harshvardhan Kapoor; Saiyami Kher; Anuj Choudhry; Art Malik; K. K. Raina; Om Puri; Anjali Patil
- Cinematography: Pawel Dyllus
- Edited by: P. S. Bharathi
- Music by: Shankar–Ehsaan–Loy; Daler Mehndi
- Production companies: Cinestaan Film Company; Rakeysh Omprakash Mehra Pictures
- Distributed by: Cinestaan AA Distributors
- Release date: 7 October 2016
- Country: India
- Language: Hindi
- Budget: ₹45 crore
- Box office: ₹13.5 crore

Mirzya (transl. O Mirza) is a 2016 Indian Hindi-language romantic fantasy film directed by Rakeysh Omprakash Mehra. Produced by Cinestaan Film Company and Mehra under his ROM Pictures, it stars Harshvardhan Kapoor and Saiyami Kher in lead roles along with Anuj Choudhry, Om Puri, Art Malik, K. K. Raina, and Anjali Patil in supporting roles. The basic premise of the film is inspired by the Punjabi folklore of Mirza Sahiban.

Mirzya was released in India on 7 October 2016. The film received mixed critical reception and was a box-office bomb, grossing ₹13 crore against a budget of ₹45 crore .

== Plot ==
Mirzya tells the tale of two lovebirds who were never meant to be together. Mohnish (Harshvardhan Kapoor) is a horse groomsman who reconnects with his childhood friend Suchitra "Suchi" (Saiyami Kher), a soon-to-be princess.

Mohnish and Suchi are inseparable friends and classmates in high school in Jodhpur. One day, the schoolmaster canes Suchi for not doing her homework. Mohnish cannot bear the sight of her being hurt and later shoots the teacher with a gun he stole from Suchi's father, a policeman. As a result, he is sent to a juvenile correction facility, and Suchi's father sends her away to London for higher studies. Mohnish escapes the correction home.

Years later, Suchi returns to India and is now getting engaged to Prince Karan. She wants to learn horseriding, and Karan instructs the stablehand, Aadil, to teach her. Suchi has a sense of deja vu and eventually discovers that Aadil is her childhood friend, Mohnish. The two of them reconcile and make love.

They become inseparable again, and Suchi tells Aadil to confess to her father that he is ready to seek due punishment for the murder he committed in his childhood. However, when Aadil tries to tell Suchi's father that he wants to make amends for his wrongdoing and wishes to marry Suchi, her unforgiving father and Karan hatch a plot to get rid of him. Karan shoots him, and although injured, Aadil doesn't die.

Unable to find Aadil anymore, Suchi agrees to marry Karan. On the wedding day, Aadil's friend, Zeenat, comes to Suchi's rescue. She ensures Suchi and Aadil escape on his bike, and the lovers elope. They share a few moments of love and freedom on their desert ride. However, when the bike runs out of petrol, they are chased down by the police, Suchi's father, and Karan. Zeenat slits her wrists and dies because she knows that if caught, she will have to reveal her friends' whereabouts. Just as they reach the Rajasthan border, Aadil is shot; Suchi swallows poison, and they die in one another's arms.

== Cast ==
- Harshvardhan Kapoor as Mohnish/Aadil
- Saiyami Kher as Suchitra "Suchi"
- Anuj Choudhry as Karan
- Anjali Patil as Zeenat
- Art Malik as Suchi's father
- K. K. Raina as Karan's father
- Om Puri as Narrator

== Soundtrack ==
The soundtrack was composed by Shankar–Ehsaan–Loy. There are 15 tracks in the album, including 6 short songs on the character of Mirzya, composed by Daler Mehndi, with all lyrics written by Gulzar.

== Reception ==
=== Box office ===
The film grossed ₹96 million (US$1.0 million) during its first week run and performed poorly at the box office.

=== Critical reception ===
On review aggregator website Rotten Tomatoes, the film holds an approval rating of 55% based on 11 reviews, and an average rating of 5/10. On Metacritic, which assigns a normalized rating, the film has a score of 52 out of 100, based on 4 critics, indicating "mixed or average reviews".

Variety's Guy Lodge said, "Star-crossed lovers do as star-crossed lovers must in this bright, ambitious but incompletely conceived Bollywood spectacle." Meena Iyer of Times of India gave the film a 3/5 rating, praised the performance of leads Harshvardhan and Saiyami, and called the film "A broad, brash Bollywood romance, juggling Punjabi folklore with more contemporary Shakespearean allusions in its two-tiered narrative". The Economic Times gave the film 3.5/5 rating and stated, "Impressive performance by Harshvardhan Kapoor & Saiyami Kher, but a one-time watch."

=== Accolades ===
Award	Category	Recipients	Result
Screen Awards	Best Male Debut	Harshvardhan Kapoor	Won
Stardust Awards	Superstar of Tomorrow – Male	Harshvardhan Kapoor	Won
Stardust Awards	Superstar of Tomorrow – Female	Saiyami Kher	Won
9th Mirchi Music Awards	Raag-Inspired Song of the Year	"Kaaga"	Nominated
9th Mirchi Music Awards	Best Song Producer (Programming & Arranging)	Santosh Mulekar & Shankar–Ehsaan–Loy – "Kaaga"	Won
9th Mirchi Music Awards	Best Song Producer (Programming & Arranging)	Shankar–Ehsaan–Loy – "Mirzya"	Nominated
9th Mirchi Music Awards	Best Song Engineer (Recording & Mixing)	Tanay Gajjar, Abhay Rumde, Gaurav Gupta, Manasi Tare, Abhishek Khandelwal & Shantanu Hudlikar – "Mirzya"	Nominated
9th Mirchi Music Awards	Best Background Score	Tubby-Parik	Won

== See also ==
- Mirza Sahiban
