= Kapkapiii =

2025 Indian film by Sangeeth Sivan

- Directed by: Sangeeth Sivan
- Screenplay by: Kumar Priyadarshi; Saurabh Anand
- Based on: Romancham by Jithu Madhavan
- Produced by: Jayesh Patel
- Starring: Tusshar Kapoor; Shreyas Talpade; Siddhi Idnani
- Cinematography: Deep Sawant
- Edited by: Bunty Nagi
- Music by: Ajay Jayanti
- Production company: Bravo Entertainment
- Distributed by: Zee Studios
- Release date: 23 May 2025
- Running time: 138 minutes
- Country: India
- Language: Hindi

Kapkapiii is a 2025 Indian Hindi-language horror-comedy film directed by Sangeeth Sivan and produced by Jayesh Patel. The film stars Tusshar Kapoor, Shreyas Talpade and Siddhi Idnani. It is a remake of the 2023 Malayalam film Romancham. The adapted screenplay is written by Kumar Priyadarshi and Saurabh Anand. The film was released on 23 May 2025.

== Cast ==
- Tusshar Kapoor as Kabir
- Shreyas Talpade as Manu
- Siddhi Idnani as Kavya
- Jay Thakkar as Nanku
- Sonia Rathee as Madhu
- Dibyendu Bhattacharya as Jamil
- Abhishek Kumar as Rivin
- Manmeet Kaur as Anamika
- Varun Pandey as Nirup
- Dherendra Tiwari as Vijay
- Ishita Raj (special appearance in the song "Titli")

== Production ==
Producer Jayesh Patel acquired the remake of the 2023 Malayalam hit Romancham and approached Sangeeth Sivan to direct the movie. After Sivan came on board, Tusshar Kapoor and Shreyas Talpade were signed for the lead roles, the former reuniting with the director after a gap of 19 years before it was Kya Kool Hain Hum and the latter, 18 years after Apna Sapna Money Money. Sangeeth Sivan died in May 2024, while the film was still in post-production.The film was finally released on 23 May 2025.

== Reception ==
Ronak Kotecha of The Times of India rated the film 3/5 stars and wrote "The screenplay, while rooted in a solid concept, feels cluttered with too many characters and too much chaos. While the humour works, the horror often fizzles. Still, the chemistry between the boys keeps things from falling apart. Overall, ‘Kapkapiii’ is a harmless fun film that will tickle your funny bone but won’t exactly send shivers down your spine."

Sanyukta Thakare of Mashable India call said the film had croppy writing and poor editing. Rahul Desai of The Hollywood Reporter India described the film as "'Kapkapiii' is distracted, disconnected and has 142 minutes of vibes. It is disorienting, patched-up, sporadic and incomplete, and not in a good-psychedelic way." Risabh Suri of the Hindustan Times rated the film 2/5 stars and opined "Kapkapiii is a classic case of wasted potential—a film that wants to be a quirky horror-comedy but ends up being neither spooky nor funny. It leans too heavily on tired tropes, underdeveloped subplots, and a scattered screenplay."

Vinamra Mathur of Firstpost rated the film 1.5/5 stars and highlighted "Without giving away much of the puerile plot, Kapkapiii is about a man desperately trying to meet his roommates to tell them something but is not allowed to meet anyone. Unlike the Malayalam original, the remake fails to do justice to the rootedness of the story. The makers are too busy in trying to gratify the appetite of the audience to see more films of this genre but fail."

Mayur Sanap of Rediff rated the film 1/5 stars and stated "What grabs your attention is the end credit which has a montage of BTS pictures of Sangeeth Sivan from the sets. He is smiling, chatting, laughing with his team. This ends up as the only lingering prospect."
