= Udai Singh Pawar =

- Born: 1982 (age 43–44)
- Occupations: Director, Screenwriter
- Years active: 2009–present
- Parent: Rajendra Singh Pawar

Udai Singh Pawar is a filmmaker and screenwriter based in Mumbai, India.

Pawar was the Writer and the Director of the acclaimed Netflix Original Feature Film Upstarts, which has been streaming since October 2019. Most recently, he wrote the Story and Screenplay of the Jio Cinema Streaming show Murder In Mahim, which was nominated for a Filmfare Award for Best Adapted Screenplay.

Before becoming an independent Director, he had been the Associate Director of the Akshay Kumar-starrer Airlift, made by Raja Krishna Menon, and even earlier, had been the Chief/1st Assistant Director to veteran film director Sudhir Mishra for five years, on multiple projects, such as the Irrfan Khan-starrer Yeh Saali Zindagi and the Arjun Rampal-starrer Inkaar.

Pawar is a Physics graduate from IIT Kanpur, with a background blending technology and art. Before shifting to film-making in 2009, Udai had worked extensively in technology research, with multiple patents and publications to his name.

== Early life ==
Udai grew up in New Delhi and studied at Delhi Public School, R.K.Puram. After which he took the JEE exam and got into IIT, Kanpur, in the five year integrated Masters program in Physics. As a course of his study he interned at the MIT Media Lab in Boston under Neil Gershenfeld where he shared a publication, and then later also at ARRI Cinema R&D, Munich when his interest for cinema grew. For his masters thesis, Udai built a pulse-shaper for femto-second lasers which was used for various research projects, and also lead to a published work.

== Pre-film Career ==
Udai started his professional career at Microsoft Research in Bangalore, where he worked on Technologies for Emerging Markets, focusing on education in village schools. There, he invented the acclaimed Multipoint (initially known as MultiMouse) and SplitScreen technologies, and conducted studies on the best ways to use technology to teach kids. He was awarded in 2007 by Wall Street Journal Asia, and his work was also highlighted publicly by Bill Gates himself.

He earned some US patents and key research publications, before taking a sabbatical in 2008 to travel around the world for 13 months, with just a backpack and a guitar. On his return, he worked in the General Elections 2009 as a campaign aide to then-Member of Parliament Jyotiraditya Scindia, before deciding to take the leap full-time to his childhood passion for film-making, in 2009.

== Film career ==
He reportedly had to stand and wait on the road outside famous Bollywood director Sudhir Mishra’s office to meet him. Udai then assisted Mishra for five years on multiple films such as the Irrfan Khan-starrer Yeh Saali Zindagi and the Arjun Rampal-starrer Inkaar. After this, he worked with Raja Krishna Menon as the Associate Director on the box-office-superhit film Airlift that starred Akshay Kumar. There, he also directed the B-Unit and did a lot of the action choreography.

Post that, Menon offered to produce Udai’s first film, which was pitched to Netflix and was picked up for their first slate of 8 Indian Original Films, and was co-produced by Menon and Netflix

Upstarts was released in October 2019 as a Netflix original and was well regarded by critics.

RollingStone gave it 4 out of 5 stars ("The Unexpectedly Relatable Success Story, this feel-good movie tackles millennial Indian ambition and does it right"), Indian new organisation FirstPost also gave it 4 out of 5 stars ("…thoroughly researched, unabashed ode to India's startup ecosystem… kind of conviction that is oft absent from success-story films.”) Noted film critic and author Jai Arjun Singh reviewed it positively in the Telegraph, "Every once in a while, you come across a film that is so direct – and has so much heart – that you stop thinking about labels or classifications, or about your own preconceptions, and simply go along for the ride.”

Other venues like Outlook (Indian magazine), News18, The Quint, The New Indian Express, SonyBIZ Asia, Common Sense Media, etc., also covered it positively with an average of 3 to 3.5 stars, and even some foreign reviewers. It was also nominated for Radio City (Indian radio station) Hitlist web awards for Best Web Film of 2019.

The film was also hailed by the Indian startup and business community, with the business media, National TV and social media speaking covering it, including some of India's most successful entrepreneurs tweeting about it, including Infosys founder Nandan Nilekani and Biotech industry leader Kiran Mazumdar-Shaw.

Most recently, he wrote the Story and Screenplay of the Jio Cinema Streaming show Murder In Mahim, which was based on the Jerry Pinto novel.
