= Pravina Deshpande =

Indian actress (1965–2026)

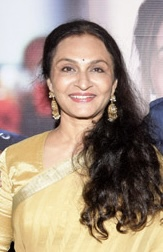
- Deshpande in 2017
- Born: 1965
- Died: 17 February 2026 (aged 60); Mumbai, Maharashtra, India
- Occupation: Actress
- Years active: 2008–2026
- Known for: Karam Apnaa Apnaa; Kulfi Kumar Bajewala
- Children: 2

Pravina Deshpande (1965 – 17 February 2026) was an Indian actress who mainly worked in Marathi and Hindi films and television shows. She was known for her performances in television shows like Ghar Ek Mandir, Karam Apnaa Apnaa (2006), and Kulfi Kumar Bajewala (2018). Deshpande also appeared in films like Ready, Ek Villain and Jalebi. She last appeared in the Netflix web series Taskaree (2026).

== Selected filmography ==
1. Mumbai Meri Jaan (2008)
2. Ready (2011)
3. Bombay Talkies (2013)
4. D-Day (2013)
5. Monsoon Shootout (2013)
6. Ek Villain (2014)
7. Crazy Cukkad Family (2015)
8. Gabbar Is Back (2015)
9. Aligarh (2015)
10. Gaon (2018)
11. Blackmail (2018)
12. Golak Bugni Bank Te Batua (2018)
13. Parmanu: The Story of Pokhran (2018)
14. Jalebi (2018)
15. Hacked (2020)
16. Taskaree (2026)

== Death ==
Deshpande died of blood cancer in Mumbai, on 17 February 2026, at the age of 60. She was cremated on the same day at Andheri, Mumbai. Deshpande was survived by her husband and two children.
