= Tenzin Priyadarshi =

Tibetan Buddhist teacher

The Venerable Tenzin Priyadarshi Rinpoche
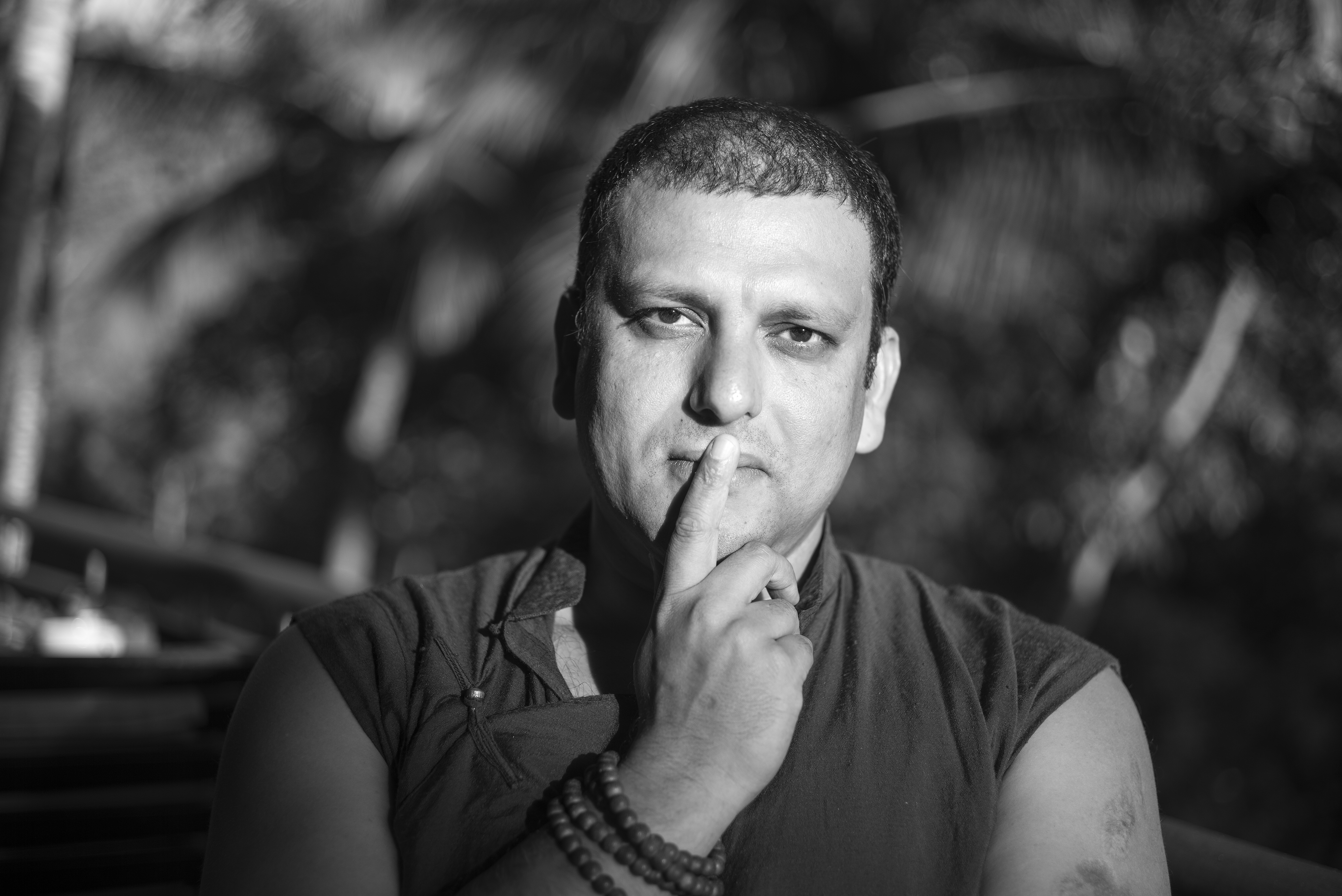
- Priyadarshi in 2016
- Born: Vaishali district, Bihar, India

Academic work
- Discipline: Ethics, Philosophy, Religion
- Sub-discipline: Ethics and Governance of AI/ Emerging Technologies, Conflict Resolution and Peace-making
- Institutions: Massachusetts Institute of Technology
- Notable works: Running Toward Mystery: Adventures of an Unconventional Life Solivagant: Tales of Solitude and Wonderment
- Website: imonk.org

Tenzin Priyadarshi is philosopher, educator and polymath monk. He is regarded as a prominent Buddhist teacher who traverses between spiritual and academic domains. For over two decades, Priyadarshi has taught at the Massachusetts Institute of Technology where he has led initiatives on values and compassion based leadership, ethics and emerging technologies. He is a co-founder of the Ethics and Governance of AI Fund which was a consortium of various non profits and academic institutions including MIT and Berkman Klein Center at Harvard University. Priyadarshi also teaches at the International College of Innovation at National Chengchi University in Taiwan and other colleges and universities in Asia and Latin America.

== Early years ==
Priyadarshi was born into a Hindu family in Vaishali district, Bihar, India. He comes from a family of bureaucrats, political leaders, and eminent scholars. He has two sisters, one is an attorney and the other, Shilpa Shukla, is a famed actress in the Indian film industry.

He entered the monastery at the age of ten in Rajgir, India near the ancient Nalanda University at his own volition. He is a Buddhist monk from India ordained by the Dalai Lama, who is his preceptor and mentor. He also studied under the guidance of Sakya Trizin, Drikung Chhetsang, Kushok Bakula Rinpoche and Samdhong Rinpoche, and received meditation training from Drubwang Rinpoche. Priyadarshi trained in India, Nepal, and Japan in Indo-Tibetan and Japanese Buddhism, and is known for his love of Sanskrit Buddhist literature. He also spent several years studying Vedanta and Kashmir Shaivism in Kolkata, and maintained close relations with the Ramakrishna Mission Ashram.

He attended Central Institute of Higher Tibetan Studies and the Sanskrit University in Varanasi, India, and graduated from Le Moyne College, summa cum laude, with a bachelor's degree as an integral honors scholar studying philosophy, physics, and religious studies with minors in international relations and Japanese. In 2003 he completed his graduate studies in comparative philosophy of religion at Harvard University. In 2002 he was appointed as the first Buddhist chaplain at MIT.

== Teaching career ==
Priyadarshi lectures internationally on Buddhist philosophy, ethics, leadership, and socio-political issues.

In 2009, Priyadarshi founded the Dalai Lama Center for Ethics and Transformative Values at MIT to design and disseminate innovative programs on teaching secular ethics and human values. The decision to name this center was based on the Dalai Lama's commitment to human wellbeing and the fact that he was named as a top global leader in a survey in 2008. The Center for Ethics has 6 Nobel Peace Laureates as its founding members and its programs run in 14 countries while poised for a global reach.

Priyadarshi was also involved with designing a Vocal Vibrations exhibit with Tod Machover, Neri Oxman, and David Edwards.

He is regarded as an influential teacher in the Rimé (non-sectarian) movement within Tibetan Buddhism, like his predecessor. He founded the Prajnopaya Institute to create an avenue for critical study and practice of Buddhist philosophy within Europe and North America. To promote contemplative programs in North America, he founded Bodhimarga, a CyberDharma community with satellite locations in various parts of North America, Europe, and Asia.

== Ethics and Governance of Artificial Intelligence (AI) ==
In 2013, Priyadarshi began programs on Ethics and Governance of Emerging technologies focused particularly on Artificial Intelligence and CRISPR. Program was formalized when he was invited to join the MIT Media Lab and became a precursor to creation of Ethics and Governance of AI Fund in 2015. His recommendation was that fairly soon this will be a noisy space and that tech companies will effectively give rise to confusion rooted in virtue signaling. Though the Fund was relatively small compared to all the investments going into AI research and development, Priyadarshi suggested focusing on developing AI for social good with grass-root partners. Fund was supported by the Knight Foundation, Hewlett-Packard Foundation, Pierre Omidyar and Reid Hoffman. Primary institutions overseeing this work are MIT Media Lab and the Berkman Klein Center for Internet & Society at Harvard University. Priyadarshi was critical of Google Deep Mind when they proposed an Ethics Board referring to it as a “veneer”. Deep Mind ethics board was dissolved soon after. In 2018, Priyadarshi became a Fellow at the Center for Advanced Study in the Behavioral Sciences ('CASBS') at Stanford University. During this period Priyadarshi met with several Tech founders whose AI groups were either a non-profit or at nascent stage to encourage discussions around civic responsibility and future of humanity. Priyadarshi singularly pointed out the lack of empathy and compassion as a framework in development of AI and referred to certain founders' condition as “distinctively pathological” in his presentations.

Priyadarshi helped form the Council for Extended Intelligence under the auspices of IEEE and MIT Media Lab to encourage ethics discussion and training for key players and engineers involved in AI research and development work. His thesis was that governments were either lagging behind or not equipped to create policy or regulatory framework around AI let alone to establish a mechanism for enforcement of any such vision. He appreciated the efforts of EU but remained skeptical of global compliance by tech companies. The Council had a diverse and global membership including Professors Martha Minow and Danielle Wood.

In 2026, during his talk at the Council for Foreign Relation in New York, Priyadarshi was asked to comment on the efforts by founder of an AI company and a lead tech designer proposing a device to help regulate youth from addiction to social media. He Said “I try not to be cynical, nor have I given up hope that people including tech leaders can change for positive. However, imagine if head of a drug cartel came to you and asked you to entrust them with a de-addiction program for the youth and suggested that the government adopt it. What would your realistic response be? I personally have not witnessed any effort to positively change the culture or incentives in the leaders of these companies. We must be radically honest and exercise cautious optimism.”

In recent months, Priyadarshi has called for “AI civic preparedness” to create more tools and public forums to help prepare civic society be better informed both in adoption as well as policy-making. He suggests that “during the advent of social media, we spent a great deal of time in confusion and cynicism to the detriment of civic society. We were not prepared to deal with polarization, rise in mental illness, fragmentation of trust in civiv institutions and systems and it will take us a really long time to heal and repair.

Priyadarshi is a Senior Fellow at Democracy, Society and Emerging Technologies, a think tank based in Taiwan.

== Ethics and empathy efforts ==
In 2015, Priyadarshi became a Directors' Fellow at MIT Media Lab and directed the ethics initiative (2015-2019) to help foster critical conversations on ethics and emerging technologies with focus on AI and CRISPR in particular. Through this he made efforts to promote research and program design to facilitate broader and deeper understanding of ethics and empathy adherence. He coined the expression "ethics as optimization" to convey a distinctive approach to ethics learning. Turing Prize winner Edward Feigenbaum said that he was encouraged by this novel "ethics as optimization" approach to Cognitive Computing and AI as presented by Priyadarshi at a summit in Napa, California.

Speaking during a private gathering of lawmakers and business leaders, Priyadarshi suggested "lack of empathy as a public health issue." He encouraged the audience to begin thinking of nurturing ethics and empathy (as well as its "upgraded forms" such as kindness and compassion) as civic responsibility without which any democratic system is at threat. "Any systems thinker working on wellbeing of the individual, organizations and societies cannot ignore ethics and empathy framework," he proposed.

== Conflict resolution and peace efforts ==
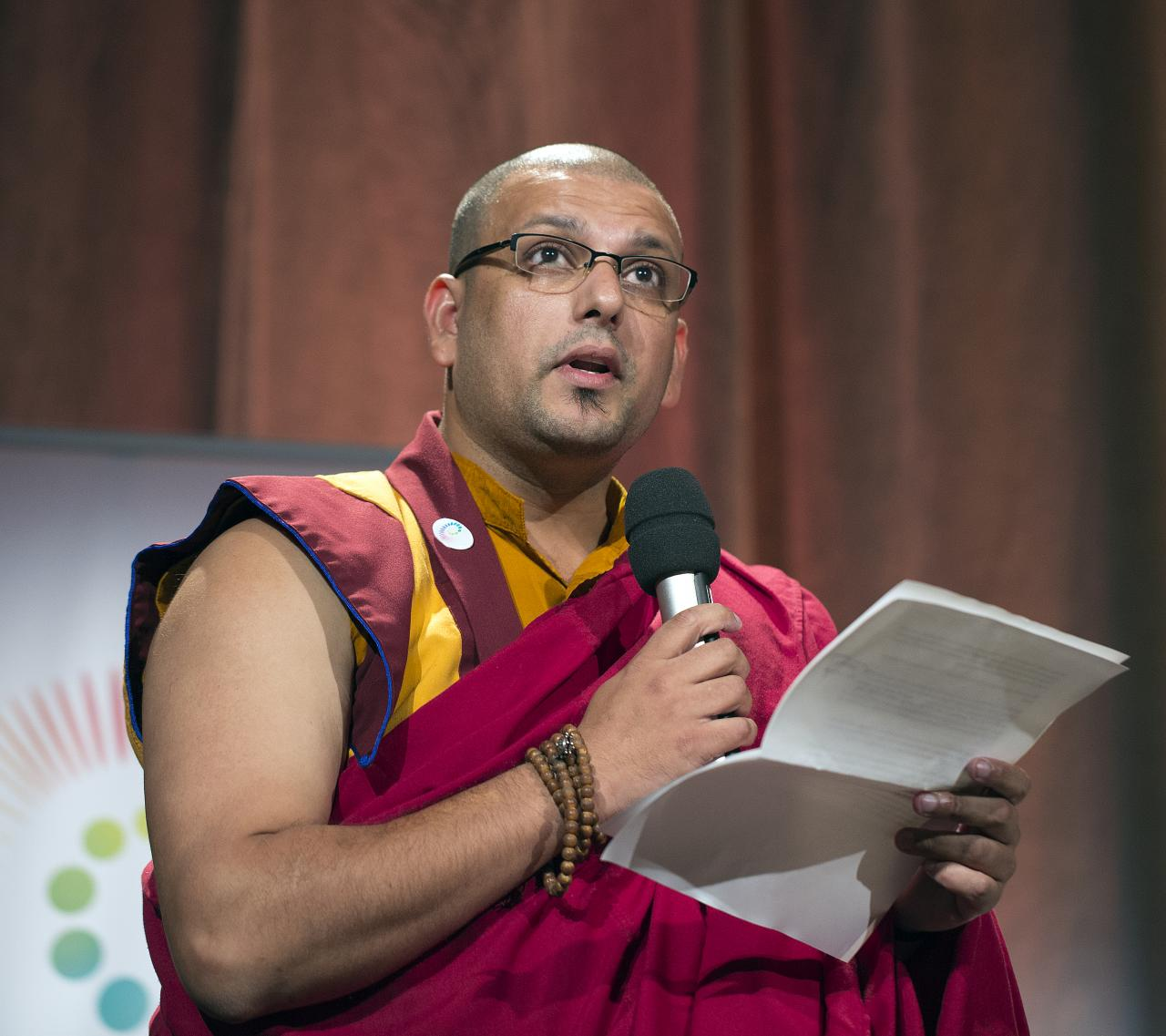
Tenzin Priyadarshi at Dalai Lama's visit to Boston 2012

Having been exposed to the dangers of religious fanaticism and violence early on, Priyadarshi has been instrumental in conflict resolution processes in India and Sri Lanka. He has been actively involved in inter-religious dialogue with religious leaders such as Pope John Paul II, Desmond Tutu, and Pope Benedict XVI. He has made his admiration for Francis of Assisi quite public and travels to Italy frequently to engage in spiritual dialogue with Christian monastic communities. He actively promotes contemplative learning beyond religious boundaries and talks frequently with Thomas Keating, founder of Contemplative Outreach. He received a Felicitation for his work at the 2007 SAARC Interfaith Conclave in New Delhi, India. He delivered the Reverend Daniel Berrigan SJ Peace Makers Lecture in 2013 at Le Moyne College, New York. He also received the Distinguished Alumni Honors from Harvard University in April 2013 recognizing his contributions. In 2021, Priyadarshi received Distinguished Alumni Award from Le Moyne College.

== Humanitarian projects ==
Following the disasters caused by the 2005 tsunami, Priyadarshi founded the Prajnopaya Foundation to develop innovative and sustainable ways to alleviate suffering in developing countries. The foundation has been active in health care endeavors in India, including systematic methods to curtail tuberculosis and bring health care to rural areas.

He was a project advisor to a team of architects from MIT, Harvard Graduate School of Design, and University of Cambridge to develop Tsunami Safe(r) Houses, low cost high resistant homes for families in Sri Lanka. In December 2009, Priyadarshi was felicitated as "Icon of Bihar" at the Bihar Conclave. He is the youngest person to receive this honor.

== Other activities ==
Priyadarshi is a Tribeca Disruptive Fellow. He was a 2018 Fellow at the Center for Advanced Study in the Behavioral Sciences at Stanford University. He served as the founding member and director of the Vishwa Shanti Stupa (World Peace Pagoda Projects) in New Delhi and Sarnath (Varanasi), India. He serves as trustee for The National Shrine of Saint Francis of Assisi and an advisor to the Renaissance Project in San Francisco, California. He is also actively involved in ongoing dialogue between Buddhism, meditation and neuroscience.

== Media and publication ==
Priyadarshi released an album of select Buddhist prayers in Sanskrit at the request of his students. The collection entitled "Revival: Sanskrit Buddhist Chants" was done in collaboration with a symphony in Mexico. Priyadarshi said "it was an impromptu fun collaboration to expose people to the power of Sanskrit language and chants. It has no entertainment value." This collection is now available on YouTube and other channels. Flutist and Musician Paul Horn said "The Venerable Tenzin Priyadarshi's soft powerful chanting, in a warm lush instrumental setting, offers a deep spiritual experience for the listener. A beautiful recording." Krishna Das adds "With a great depth of Devotion that is lit with Wisdom, Tenzin Priyadarshi creates a beautiful offering of Ancient Buddhist Prayers."

In 2020, Priyadarshi released his book "Running Toward Mystery: The Adventure of an Unconventional Life" with Random House US. Sting calls it "a necessary and captivating narrative of spiritual courage and truth seeking far beyond the veil of our contemporary delusions." Pulitzer Prize–winning author of The Emperor of All Maladies, Siddhartha Mukherjee says “Running Toward Mystery is not merely a book, but an experience, a biography, a formula for living, and a manifesto for a new kind of exploration of life. Tenzin Priyadarshi writes with the extraordinary conviction and grace that can only come from fulfillment. This book produces a kind of joy—and a nudge towards curiosity—that only few books can provide. It is, at the same time, a pathway and a journey. I could not put it down.”

In September 2024, Priyadarshi released “Solivagant: Tales of Solitude and Wonderment,” a book of collection of photographs accompanied by exhibitions in Singapore and Hanoi, Vietnam. Solivagant is a photo essay of a mendicant’s contemplative journey of observing the world. His Majesty Jigmey Khesar Namgyel Wangchuk, King of Bhutan wrote the foreword for this book. Afterword for the book is written by His Royal Highness Idris Shah, Sultan of Selangor (Malaysia).

In 2026, Priyadarshi's talk was published in a book "Development Dialogues: Journeys, Ideas, and the Makers of Modern India" by Dr. Dattaraj Salgaoncar. The book features thirteen candid conversations with prominent figures, including leaders and experts such as Dr. S. Jaishankar, Kiran Mazumdar-Shaw, and Ritu Karidhal.
