= Decoupled =

Indian web series

- Genre: Comedy
- Created by: Manu Joseph
- Written by: Manu Joseph
- Directed by: Hardik Mehta
- Starring: R. Madhavan; Surveen Chawla
- Theme music composer: Rachita Arora
- Country of origin: India
- Original language: English
- No. of seasons: 1
- No. of episodes: 8

Production
- Production location: India
- Cinematography: Piyush Puty
- Editors: Parikshhit Jha; Manan Ashwin Mehta
- Running time: 26-36 min

Original release
- Network: Netflix
- Release: 17 December 2021

Decoupled is an Indian English-language comedy television series created and written by Manu Joseph for Netflix and directed by Hardik Mehta. The series stars R. Madhavan and Surveen Chawla in the lead roles.

== Plot ==
A misanthropic writer and his startup-founder wife juggle their impending divorce with the absurdities and annoyances of life in their affluent world.

== Cast ==
- R. Madhavan as Arya
- Surveen Chawla as Shruti
- Arista Mehta as Rohini
- Chetan Bhagat as himself
- Atul Kumar as Agni
- Bhavik Kelawala as Jamal Sarif
- Aseem Hattangadi as Mayank
- Mir Afsar Ali as Dr Basu
- Sonia Rathee as Masha
- Darren E. Scott as Jean Lee
- Dilnaz Irani as Reema
- Himanee Bhatia
- Akash Khurana as Surinder Sharma
- Apara Mehta as Madhu Sharma
- Mukesh Bhatt as Ganesh
- Nazneen Madan as Bhumika
- Salim Siddiqui as Salim Bhai
- Srestha Banerjee as Decoupling Party Manager (Goa)

== Episodes ==
No.	Title	Directed by	Written by	Original release date
1	"Shake His Hand"	Hardik Mehta	Manu Joseph	17 December 2021
Arya and Shruti debate the status of their marriage. Later, Arya’s argumentative impulses land him in trouble at the airport and at a restaurant.
2	"Her Phone Hangs"	Hardik Mehta	Manu Joseph	17 December 2021
Tasked with pitching a streaming series, Arya takes an idea to his CEO-turned-guru friend. Shruti grapples with telling Rohini about her and Arya.
3	"Champion of Maids"	Hardik Mehta	Manu Joseph	17 December 2021
Rohini posts a video to Arya’s Twitter account that gains him new fans. Angry that he won’t take it down, Shruti gets payback at a literature festival.
4	"Peak Ovulation"	Hardik Mehta	Manu Joseph	17 December 2021
Arya attempts to take advantage of a monthly cycle tracking app. Shruti asks him to handle an awkward conversation with her father.
5	"The Ex Returns"	Hardik Mehta	Manu Joseph	17 December 2021
One of Arya’s ex-flames comes to town, but after meeting in person, his excitement to introduce her to Shruti at a party that evening quickly wanes.
6	"Affairs"	Hardik Mehta	Manu Joseph	17 December 2021
As he and Shruti consider seeing other people, Arya suggests a party to announce their divorce. Arya visits Ganesh’s home in hopes of bringing him back.
7	"How to Tell Your Daughter About Divorce"	Hardik Mehta	Manu Joseph	17 December 2021
Arya’s locker room conduct appalls some neighbors. The couple bickers over who will inform Rohini about the divorce. Shruti’s parents visit unexpectedly.
8	"The History of a Marriage"	Hardik Mehta	Manu Joseph	17 December 2021
Family and friends arrive in Goa for the decoupling party. Arya encounters a familiar face at the resort. Shruti receives a lucrative offer from Mr. Lee.

== Release ==
The series opened to mixed review from critics, though the performances of the lead pair received praise. The show's creator, Manu Joseph, subsequently noted that 'liberal media' outlets targeted the show.

Within three days of release, the series became the leading Indian series on the platform of the week.
