= Gaon (film) =

Gaon The Village No More
- Directed by: Gautam Singh
- Screenplay by: Gautam Singh
- Produced by: Gautam Singh, Neha Singh
- Starring: Shadab Kamal; Neha Mahajan; Gopal K Singh; Dibyendu Bhattacharya; Rohit Pathak; Omkar Das Manikpuri; Shishir Sharma; Praveena Deshpande
- Cinematography: Naiyer Ghufran
- Edited by: Adrian Billing, Gautam Singh
- Music by: Chinmay Hulyalkar (Background)
- Release date: 26 October 2018
- Country: India
- Language: Hindi

Gaon The Village No More is an Indian film directed by the filmmaker Gautam Singh. The film stars Shadab Kamal, Omkar Das Manikpuri, Shishir Sharma and Neha Mahajan.

The film is scheduled to release on 26 October 2018.

== Plot ==
This film is inspired by director Gautam Singh Sigdar's own village in Jharkhand, India. The film talks about the way the element of money impacts the society. It attempts to showcase the journey that India has gone through in the last 200 years in a nutshell. Bharat, the village, is self-reliant with everyone contributing towards the well-being of the rest of the villagers. Things dramatically transform when an outsider, called Bharat, enters the village. The village Bharat and the man Bharat represent diametrically opposite interpretations of ideas.

== Cast ==
- Shadab Kamal – Bharat
- Neha Mahajan – Sango
- Gopal K Singh – Vaid Ji
- Dibyendu Bhattacharya – Belu
- Rohit Pathak – Mangla
- Omkar Das Manikpuri – Shambhu
- Shishir Sharma – Surjeet
- Praveena Deshpande – Bharat's mother

== Production ==
The film took five years to complete as director Gautam Singh made it while he held a full-time job in Qatar.
