= Nooru Kodi Vaanavil =

2026 Indian film by Sasi

- Release poster
- Directed by: Sasi
- Written by: Sasi
- Produced by: Balaji Kapa; Arun Arunachalam
- Starring: Harish Kalyan; Siddhi Idnani
- Cinematography: Prasanna S. Kumar
- Edited by: M. Subarak
- Music by: Siddhu Kumar
- Production companies: Madhav Media; Arun Arunachalam Production
- Distributed by: ZEE5
- Release date: 6 November 2026
- Country: India
- Language: Tamil

Nooru Kodi Vaanavil (transl. A billion rainbows) is a 2026 Indian Tamil-language romantic comedy drama film written and directed by Sasi. It stars Harish Kalyan and Siddhi Idnani in the lead roles, alongside Kovai Sarala, Thambi Ramaiah, Chinni Jayanth, Sampath, M. Rinil and VJ Parvathy. Produced by Balaji Kapa under Madhav Media and Arun Arunachalam under Arun Arunachalam Production, the film explores love, relationships and the emotional choices faced by its central characters. Though production began in 2019, it faced delays and was released directly via ZEE5 on 6 November 2026. The film's title was derived from the song "Ayayayoo Aananthamey" from the 2012 film Kumki.

== Plot ==
Vino, a newly appointed broadcaster, moves to Goa. While searching for a lead for his new show, he meets Fenny, and the two develop a romantic relationship. However, misunderstandings, frustration and conflicts complicate their bond as they navigate differing expectations, personal dilemmas and the influence of the people around them.

== Cast ==
- Harish Kalyan as Vino
- Siddhi Idnani as Fenny
- M. Rinil as Richie
- Kovai Sarala as Fenny's grandmother
- Thambi Ramaiah
- Chinni Jayanth as Vino's uncle
- Sampath Raj as Vino's father
- VJ Parvathy as Vino and Fenny's teammate

== Production ==
The project was announced in January 2022, when the makers revealed its title Nooru Kodi Vaanavil through a motion poster. The title was derived from a lyric from the song "Ayayayoo Aananthamey" from Kumki (2012), with director Sasi having acquired permission from lyricist Yugabharathi and Kumki director Prabhu Solomon. The film was produced by Balaji Kapa under Madhav Media and Arun Arunachalam under Arun Arunachalam Production. Prasanna S. Kumar handled cinematography, M. Subarak served as editor, and E. Thiyagarajan was the art director. Production began in 2019, but the film remained unreleased for several years. Harish Kalyan, the lead actor, said that work was interrupted during the COVID-19 pandemic; the Goa schedule had been completed, while a portion to be filmed in Mumbai remained pending.

== Soundtrack ==
The soundtrack was composed by Siddhu Kumar in his second collaboration with Sasi after Sivappu Manjal Pachai (2019). A single "Kannaatti" was released on 11 March 2022. The full album was released on 5 November 2026.

Track listing
No.	Title	Lyrics	Singer(s)	Length
1.	"Kannaatti"	Vignesh Ramakrishna	Anand Aravindakshan	3:21
2.	"Po Podhum Po"	Mohan Rajan	Sid Sriram	3:32
3.	"Kondrai Pookal"	Mohan Rajan	Nikhil Mathew	4:02
4.	"Idhu Edhuvarai"	Mohan Rajan	Sudharshan Ashok	5:23
5.	"2K Ponnu"	Mohan Rajan	Benny Dayal	3:16
Total length:				19:34

== Release ==
Nooru Kodi Vaanavil was released directly via ZEE5 on 6 November 2026, the week of Diwali. The film was made available through ZEE5 Global's pay-per-view model, with the platform positioning it for Tamil audiences in North America and other supported regions.

== Reception ==
A critic from Insightful Reels gave the film 3 out of 5 stars and described it as a "pretty, familiar and well acted" romance. The critic appreciated Idnani's performance, particularly her portrayal of Fenny's emotional conflict, and noted that the chemistry between Harish and Idnani made the film pleasant viewing despite its old-fashioned storytelling. Ganesh A of Asianet News praised Harish for bringing a natural performance to Vino, saying that he convincingly portrayed a career-focused young man confronting unexpected emotions in love. The review also highlighted the cinematography, which captured Goa's beaches and scenic locations in a manner suited to the film's romantic tone. Tamilan Kural rated the film 3.9 out of 5. While acknowledging that its love-triangle plot was conventional, the reviewer praised Sasi's direction and the performances of Harish and Idnani, describing the film as a watchable romantic outing.

Dina Thanthi noted that Harish attracted attention through his more serious performance, moving away from the lighter roles he had previously played. Cinema Vikatan found some emotional moments and poetic dialogue effective, but felt that other lines appeared artificial. The review also observed that the film's depiction of the relationship between Vinoth and Fenny had moments of tenderness. Roopa Radhakrishnan of The Times of India gave the film 2 out of 5 stars, arguing that it gave audiences little reason to invest in the central romance. She criticised the contrived conflict between the couple, the lack of subtlety in conveying its message about toxic relationships, and the film's dated feel.

Akshay Kumar of Cinema Express gave a negative review, stating that the film "ends up going nowhere". He criticised the writing for failing to create believable characters and argued that the film prioritised visual aesthetics over emotional depth. Dinamalar rated the film 2 out of 5 and questioned whether it reflected Sasi's usual filmmaking strengths. The review acknowledged VJ Parvathy's brief comic interludes but was otherwise critical of the film. Mohan Nasre of Flickonclick gave the film 2.5 out of 5 stars. It praised the lead performances, warm chemistry and scenic setting, but found the love triangle too familiar, the twists predictable and the screenplay lacking freshness. Amrita Ghosh of Asianet News similarly identified the performances, music and Goa visuals as strengths, but said that the absence of a stronger screenplay prevented the film from offering a fresh take on the conventional love-triangle format.
