= Upstarts (film) =

2019 Indian comedy-drama film

- Directed by: Udai Singh Pawar
- Produced by: Raja Krishna Menon; Janani Ravichandran; Jawahar Sharma
- Starring: Priyanshu Painyuli; Chandrachoor Rai; Shadab Kamal; Sheetal Thakur
- Production company: Bandra West Pictures
- Distributed by: Netflix
- Release date: 18 October 2019
- Country: India
- Language: Hindi

Upstarts is a 2019 Indian Hindi-language comedy-drama film directed by Udai Singh Pawar and Produced by Janani Ravichandran and Jawahar Sharma. The film stars Priyanshu Painyuli, Chandrachoor Rai and Shadab Kamal in the lead roles and follows the story of three college graduates who create a startup and the events that follow. It was released on 18 October 2019 on Netflix. Upstart was announced by Netflix among the nine films to be made by them. Raja Krishna Menon served as the creative producer.

== Cast ==
- Priyanshu Painyuli as Kapil
- Chandrachoor Rai as Yash
- Shadab Kamal as Vinay
- Sheetal Thakur as Jaya
- Mrinal Dutt as Ajay Bansal
- Rajeev Siddhartha as Veer
- Ivan Rodrigues as Investor
- Ninad Kamat as Kapil's boss
- Swati Semwal as Richa
- Eijaz Khan as Rocky Saxena
- Meenakshi Chaudhary as Veer's girlfriend
- Rukmini Vasanth as NGO girl

== Reception ==
Aditya Shrikrishna of The New Indian Express wrote, "Upstarts, written by Pawar and Ketan Bhagat, doesn’t romanticise the idea of startup and its culture." Shikha Desai of The Times of India rated the film two-and-a-half out of five stars and wrote, "At the crux of this business drama is the struggle that manifests itself as service vs profit, making it an important ode to the Indian start-up culture."
