= Priyanshu Painyuli =

Indian actor (born 1988)

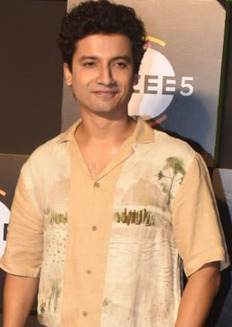
- Painyuli in 2023
- Born: 29 August 1988 (age 38)
- Occupation: Actor
- Years active: 2015-present
- Spouse: Vandana Joshi (m. 2020)

Priyanshu Painyuli is an Indian actor who appears in Hindi films. He had his breakout role in Bhavesh Joshi Superhero (2018), after which he appeared in the American action film Extraction (2020). He has also starred in the crime drama series Mirzapur (2020-2024).

== Personal life ==
He married his girlfriend of seven years, Vandana Joshi, on 26 November 2020.

== Career ==
Priyanshu started his career as a model and assistant director. He made his acting debut with Manuja Tyagi's movie Love At First Sight. After this film, he got an offer from Farhan Akhtar for the sequel film Rock On 2.

In 2018, he featured in Vikramaditya Motwane's Bhavesh Joshi Superhero in which he played the title role. He played Robin (Radhesyam) in the second and third seasons of Mirzapur, an Amazon Prime Video action crime thriller series. Painyuli also appeared in High Jack and Once Again in 2018. He played the role of Kapil in 2019 Netflix film Upstarts.

In 2020, he played the role of a Bangladeshi crime lord in Sam Hargrave's directorial debut Extraction. He starred opposite Taapsee Pannu in the sports film Rashmi Rocket.

== Filmography ==
=== Films ===
Year	Title	Role	Notes	Ref.
2016	Love At First Sight	Tanmay		
2016	Rock On 2	Rahul Sharma		
2018	Bhavesh Joshi Superhero	Bhavesh Joshi		
2018	High Jack	Chaitanya		
2018	Once Again	Dev		
2019	Upstarts	Kapil		
2020	Extraction	Amir Asif		
2021	Rashmi Rocket	Captain Gagan Thakur		
2022	Unpaused: Naya Safar	Dippy	Anthology	
2023	U-Turn	Arjun Sinha		
2023	Pippa	Major Ram Mehta		
2025	Tere Ishk Mein	Ved		
2026	Mirzapur	Robin		

=== Television ===
Year	Title	Role	Notes	Ref.
2015	Bang Baaja Baaraat	Wasim Shaikh		
2019	Soulmates	Priyanshu		
2020-2024	Mirzapur	Robin Agarwal	Amazon Prime Video series	
2023	Charlie Chopra & The Mystery Of Solang Valley	Sitaram Bisht		
2023	Shehar Lakhot	Dev Tomar		
