= Naduvakurichi =

- Village
- Location in Tamil Nadu, India Naduvakurichi (India)
- Coordinates: 8.36549°N 77.94316°E
- Country: India
- State: Tamil Nadu
- District: Thoothukudi

Languages
  - Official: Tamil
- Time zone: UTC+5:30 (IST)
- PIN: 628653
- Telephone code: 04639
- Vehicle registration: TN 92
- Lok Sabha constituency: Thoothukudi
- Legislative constituency: Srivaikuntam

Naduvakurichi is a village in Thoothukudi district in the Indian state of Tamil Nadu.
