= Siddhi Idnani =

Indian film actress

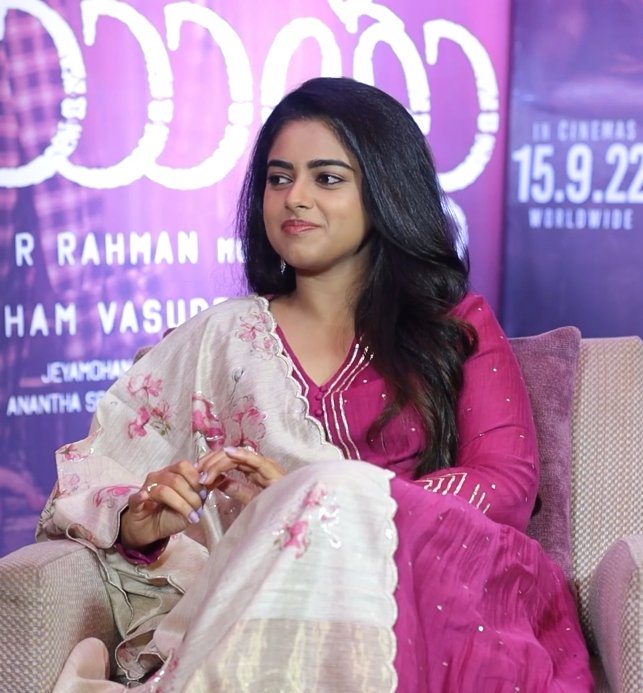
- Idnani in 2022
- Born: 10 January 1996 (age 30); Mumbai, Maharashtra, India
- Occupation: Actress
- Years active: 2017–present

Siddhi Idnani (born 10 January 1996) is an Indian actress who primarily appears in Tamil and Telugu films. She made her acting debut in Telugu film Jamba Lakidi Pamba (2018). She was critically acclaimed for her role in the Tamil film Vendhu Thanindhathu Kaadu (2022). She made her Hindi debut with The Kerala Story (2023).

== Personal life ==
Siddhi Idnani was born and brought up in Mumbai, India. Her Sindhi father, Ashok Idnani, is a businessman and voice modulation trainer and her Gujarati mother, Falguni Dave, is a television actor. She has a bachelor's degree in mass media.She married Goan businessman Shamik Caculo in November 2026 in Thailand.

== Career ==
Idnani started her career as a theatre artist known for the Gujarati commercial play Aaje Ravivaar Chec. Post that, Siddhi became a finalist at the pageant Miss Diva Ahmedabad.

Idnani started her film career with a Gujarati film titled Grand Hali. She went on to win Miss India super talent and represented India at Miss Supertalent in Paris in 2018.

She debuted in Tollywood with Jamba Lakidi Pamba in June 2018. Her second release, Prema Katha Chitram 2 with Nandita Shweta and Sumanth Ashwin, released in 2019.

She is well known for her role in the Tamil film Vendhu Thanindhathu Kaadu directed by Gautham Vasudev Menon and starring Silambarasan.

Her upcoming films include Nooru Kodi Vaanavil with the director, Sasi. She is known amongst her fans as Dimple Queen.

In 2023, Idnani starred in The Kerala Story, in which she played the role of Geethanjali Menon / Anisha Ba, who goes through struggles of societal identities and beliefs and converted to Islam, while realising the situation and eventually returning to her family but gets trapped in complexities. However, the film was panned by critics, receiving heavy criticism for its screenplay, cast performances, the inaccurate depiction of Kerala State, and was characterised as an propaganda film.

== Filmography ==
Key
| † | Denotes films that have not yet been released |

| Year | Title | Role | Language | Notes |
|---|---|---|---|---|
| 2017 | Grand Hali | Nirali | Gujarati | Debut film |
| 2018 | Jamba Lakidi Pamba | Pallavi | Telugu | Telugu debut |
| 2018 | Prema Katha Chitram 2 | Bindu | Telugu | |
| 2020 | Anukunnadi Okati Ayinadi Okati | Siddhi | Telugu | |
| 2022 | Vendhu Thanindhathu Kaadu | Paavai | Tamil | Tamil debut |
| 2023 | The Kerala Story | Geethanjali Menon / Anisha Ba | Hindi | Hindi debut |
| 2023 | Kathar Basha Endra Muthuramalingam | Tamilselvi | Tamil | |
| 2024 | The Great Gujarati Matrimony | Itishree | Gujarati | |
| 2025 | Kapkapiii | Kavya Varanasi | Hindi | |
| 2025 | Retta Thala | Anthre | Tamil | |
| 2026 | Drones | Prakruthi | Tamil | |
| 2026 | Nooru Kodi Vaanavil | Fenny | Tamil | |
