= Shilpa Shukla =

Indian actress

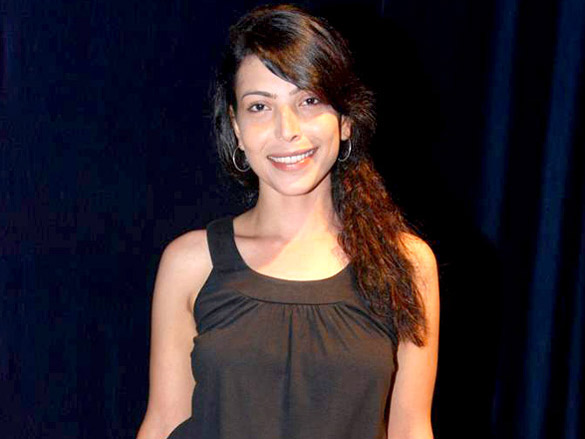
- Shukla in 2015
- Born: 22 February 1982 (age 44); Vaishali district, Bihar, India
- Occupation: Actress
- Years active: 2003–present

Shilpa Shukla (born 22 February 1982) is an Indian film and theatre actress. She is known for her roles in the 2007 sports drama Chak De! India and the 2013 neo-noir film B.A. Pass, for which she was awarded the Filmfare Critics Award for Best Actress.

== Biography ==
Shukla was born in the Vaishali district of Bihar. She comes from a family of bureaucrats, political leaders, and scholars.

She is a practising Buddhist. Her brother, Tenzin Priyadarshi, is a Buddhist monk, and her sister is an attorney.

== Filmography ==
Key
†	Denotes films that have not yet been released

=== Feature films ===
Year	Title	Role	Notes
2003	Khamosh Pani	Zubeida	French-German collaboration
2005	Hazaaron Khwaishein Aisi	Mala	
2007	Chak De! India	Bindia Naik	Nominated: Filmfare Award for Best Supporting Actress
2007	Frozen	Karma's wife	National Award 2008
2011	Bhindi Bazaar	Kanjari	
2013	Rajdhani Express	Lady SI	
2013	B.A. Pass	Sarika	Won: Filmfare Award for Best Actress (Critics); Star Screen Award
2015	Crazy Cukkad Family	Archana Berry	
2019	Bombairiya	Iravati Angre	
2022	HIT: The First Case	Sheela	
2023	Farrey	Vedita Matthew	
2024	Bastar: The Naxal Story	Neelam Nagpal	
2024	Yudhra	Renuka Bhardwaj	
2025	Crazxy	Jaan	
2025	Jolly LLB 3	Chanchal Chautala	
2026	Vadh 2	Rajni	

=== Short films ===
- Bullet (short film)

=== Television ===
- Savdhaan India (Mini Series) - Host
- Rajuben (Mini Series)

=== Web series ===
Year	Title	Role	Platform
2020	Mentalhood	Namrata Dalmia	ZEE5; ALTBalaji
2020	Hostages	Shanaya Sahani	Disney Plus Hotstar
2020	Criminal Justice: Behind Closed Doors	Ishani Nath	Disney Plus Hotstar
2022	Four More Shots Please!	Meher	Amazon Prime Video
2022	Aar Ya Paar	Kalawati Bhatta	Disney Plus Hotstar
2023	Taaza Khabar	Aapa	Disney Plus Hotstar
2023	Trial By Fire	Shalini	Netflix
2025	Khauf	Shohini	Amazon Prime
2026	Bandwaale	Doctor (Sitaara Hunt Organizer)	Amazon Prime

== Accolades ==
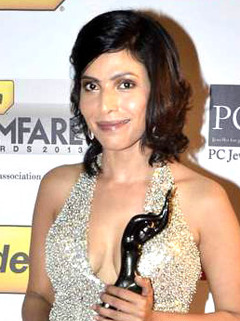
Shilpa Shukla at the 59th Idea Filmfare Awards 2013

- Won
  - 2008 Screen Awards: Best Supporting Actress for Chak De India
  - 2014 Screen Awards: Best Actor in a Negative Role (Female) for B.A. Pass
  - 2014 Filmfare Awards: Best Actress (Critics) for B.A. Pass
- Nominations
  - 2008: Filmfare Awards: Best Supporting Actress for Chak De India
  - 2008: International Indian Film Academy Awards: Best Performance in a Negative Role for Chak De India
  - 2008: Zee Cine Awards: Best Actor in a Negative Role for Chak De India
  - 2008: Producer Guild Awards: Best actor in a Negative Role for Chak De India
  - 2013: Big Fan Awards: Best fan Award from Miss world Tamanna Rana
  - 2023: 2023 Filmfare OTT Awards Best Supporting Actor (Female) Comedy series for Taaza Khabar
