= Jamba Lakidi Pamba (2018 film) =

2018 Telugu comedy film

- Film poster
- Directed by: J. B. Murali Krishna
- Written by: J. B. Murali Krishna
- Produced by: Ravi; Jojo Jose; N. Srinivas Reddy
- Starring: Srinivasa Reddy; Siddhi Idnani
- Cinematography: Satish Mutyala
- Edited by: Marthand K. Venkatesh
- Music by: Gopi Sundar
- Production company: Sivam Celluloids
- Release date: 22 June 2018
- Running time: 141 minutes
- Country: India
- Language: Telugu

Jamba Lakidi Pamba is a 2018 Indian Telugu-language comedy film directed by J. B. Murali Krishna and starring Srinivasa Reddy and Siddhi Idnani.

== Plot ==
The story revolves around a couple Varun (Srinivasa Reddy) and Pallavi (Siddhi Idnani) who file a divorce case. Their previous divorce lawyer (Posani Krishna Murali) dies in a car accident with incidentally being this as his 100th case. He wants to go to Heaven but is prevented as he separated 99 couples. But the god gave him a last chance by making Varun and Pallavi reconcile. He immediately interchanges their souls. How the lawyer tries to reconcile them forms the crux of the story.

== Cast ==
- Srinivasa Reddy as Varun
- Siddhi Idnani as Pallavi
- Vennela Kishore as Lawyer
- Himaja as Divya
- Tanikella Bharani as Varun's father
- Posani Krishna Murali as previous lawyer who died in a car accident
- Raghu Babu
- Satyam Rajesh
- Jaya Prakash Reddy as J.P
- Appaji Ambarisha Darbha as Corporate CEO
- Shakalaka Shankar
- Vadlamani Srinivas

== Reception ==
The Times of India gave 2 out of 5 stars concluding it's a dull affair. Even Deccan Chronicle newspaper rated it low saying a tale of switched souls, fails to tickle. The Hans rated it 2 on a scale of 5 and said "the film fails to impress".
