= Shikha Joshi =

Indian television actress (1976–2015)

- Joshi
- Born: 4 January 1976
- Died: 16 May 2015 (aged 40); Mumbai, Maharashtra, India
- Occupations: Actress, model, Classical Dancer
- Years active: 2006-2015

Shikha Joshi was an Indian actress, model, and classical dancer.

== Sexual molestation allegation ==
Joshi had alleged Dr. Vijay Sharma, who had performed a breast implant surgery on her in 2006, sexually exploited her in 2011. The doctor had gone missing since her death, until 20 May, when the Mumbai Police recorded a statement from him.

In November 2013, Joshi and her brother, Vishesh Joshi, were arrested for pelting stones at Sharma's residence in Andheri, but were later released on bail. According to a police officer, Shikha Joshi was supposed to make a court appearance on 24 May 2015 in connection with the stone-pelting incident.

== Death ==
On the evening of 16 May 2015, Joshi, at 40 years of age, committed suicide in her flat in Versova, Mumbai, by slitting her throat with a kitchen knife in the bathroom. Her neck had three small cuts and a large cut. The flat owner Madhu Bharti, Bharti's boyfriend Riyaz Pathan, and friend Pushpa Parmar were present with Joshi at the flat during the incident. Madhu Bharti recorded Joshi's last moments on Parmar's mobile phone in which Joshi named Dr. [Vijay] Sharma and "many married men" as responsible for her decision to commit suicide. After the message was recorded, they called Bharti's boyfriend Riyaz Pathan, who arrived at the scene 10 minutes later, following which Joshi was taken to a nearby hospital. According to an official, Joshi was taken to the hospital more than an hour after she had slit her throat. The hospital stated that "excessive bleeding" was the cause of her death.

Joshi's family believes that this is a case of murder and has been petitioning for a CBI investigation.

== Filmography ==
- B.A. Pass (2013)

== External lists ==
- Shikha Joshi at IMDb
