= Harsh Varrdhan Kapoor =

Indian actor (born 1990)

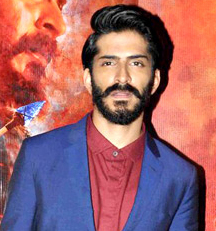
- Kapoor in 2016
- Born: 9 November 1990 (age 35); Mumbai, Maharashtra, India
- Occupation: Actor
- Years active: 2015–present
- Father: Anil Kapoor
- Family: Surinder Kapoor family

Harsh Varrdhan Kapoor (/hɑːrshvɑːrdhɑːn/ born 9 November 1990) is an Indian actor. He is the son of actor Anil Kapoor. He made his acting debut with the romantic drama film Mirzya (2016). He has since starred in the action films Bhavesh Joshi Superhero (2018) and Thar (2022).

== Early life ==
Harsh was born in Mumbai on 9 November 1990, the only son of actor Anil Kapoor and Sunita Kapoor. The youngest of three children, he is the brother of actress Sonam Kapoor and producer Rhea Kapoor. He did his early schooling at Arya Vidya Mandir in Juhu and A levels at Podar International. Kapoor pursued screenwriting at Chapman University in Orange County Southern California. While at Chapman, Harsh trained under screenwriter David S. Ward.

Harsh has often said in interviews that from a very young age, he was fortunate enough to have been exposed to various genres of cinema from all over the world. This exposure to different forms and aesthetics has been instrumental in shaping his choices and sensibilities in his own film career.

Before his acting debut, Kapoor worked as an assistant director on Anurag Kashyap's 2015 film Bombay Velvet.

== Career ==
Harsh Varrdhan made his acting debut when Rakesh Omprakash Mehra approached him for an art house romantic musical called Mirzya. Written by the Oscar-winning poet Gulzar, Mirzya used poetry and a Greek chorus as narrative guides, a style that was both bold and unconventional. Having signed the film in 2013, Harsh spent over a year preparing for the film. He learned horse riding and archery and worked on the two distinct characters that the film required him to play. Mirzya premiered at the prestigious London film festival in 2016 to positive reviews in the international press with the New York Times praising it but received mixed reviews back home in India and could not perform very well commercially. The Economic Times gave the film 3.5/5 rating and stated, "Impressive performance by Harsh Varrdhan Kapoor & Saiyami Kher, but a one-time watch."

Harsh’s next film was Vikramaditya Motwane’s vigilante drama Bhavesh Joshi Superhero. Financed by Eros, and later Reliance and Phantom Films, the film released to polarising reviews in June 2018. In spite receiving positive reviews, the film was a box-office bomb grossing just ₹4.35 crore on a ₹21 crore budget.

During the pandemic, Harsh worked closely with acting coaches Jeff Goldberg and Suraj Vyas to hone his craft. He has, on many occasions, spoken candidly about how implicitly he trusts his mentors to guide him on new projects.

In 2020, he worked with Vikramaditya Motwane again in the Netflix film AK vs AK, in which he played a fictionalised version of himself and shared the screen with his father and sister. Harsh had reportedly also signed on to play the lead in Sriram Raghavan’s Andhadhun, but eventually had to withdraw due to scheduling conflicts.

In 2021, he appeared in one of the episodes of Netflix show Ray. While reviewing, Hindustan Times's Rohan Naahar wrote "Manoj Bajpayee, Harsh Varrdhan Kapoor, Ali Fazal and Radhika Madan lead a handful of excellent performers in Netflix's irreverent but inconsistent anthology, based on Satyajit Ray's short stories."

In 2022, he acted in and co-produced a film titled Thar, which was released on Netflix on 6 May 2022. The film also starred his father, Fatima Sana Shaikh and Satish Kaushik in key roles. It was directed and co-written by Raj Singh Chaudhary. In order to play a quiet character with many shades of grey, he worked hard on his physicality so that his body language could speak louder than words. The film released on Netflix in 2022 to imxed to positive reviews reviews both domestically and internationally.

In 2023, Kapoor announced that he was working on an Abhinav Bindra biopic, which he was set to star in and produce, but as of April 2025, the project has been shelved.

== Filmography ==
=== Films ===
Year	Title	Role	Notes
2015	Bombay Velvet	—N/a	Assistant director
2016	Mirzya	Munish/Adil	
2018	Bhavesh Joshi Superhero	Sikandar "Siku" Khanna / Bhavesh Joshi / Insaaf-Man	
2020	AK vs AK	Himself	Cameo
2022	Thar	Siddharth Kumar	Also producer

=== Television ===
Year	Title	Role	Notes
2021	Ray	Vikram Arora	Episode: "Spotlight"

== Awards and nominations ==
Award	Year	Category	Nominated work	Result	Ref.
Big Star Entertainment Awards	2016	Most Entertaining Debut Actor	Mirzya	Won	
Indian Television Academy Awards	2022	Best Actor - Original Film (OTT)	Thar	Won	
Filmfare Awards	2017	Best Male Debut	Mirzya	Nominated	
Filmfare Glamour and Style Awards	2016	Fashion Debut of the Year	—N/a	Won	
Filmfare OTT Awards	2022	Best Actor - Web Original Film	Thar	Nominated	
Filmfare OTT Awards	2022	Best Web Original Film	Thar	Nominated	
Screen Awards	2016	Best Male Debut	Mirzya	Won (Note: Shared with Jim Sarbh)	
Stardust Award	2016	Best Acting Debut (Male)	Mirzya	Won	
