= List of awards and nominations received by Sonam Kapoor =

Sonam Kapoor awards and nominations
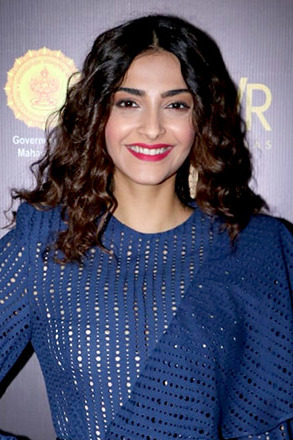
- Kapoor at Jio Mami Mumbai film festival in 2018
Awards and nominations
Award	Wins	Nominations
National Film Awards	1	1
Filmfare Awards	1	6
Screen Awards	0	6
Zee Cine Awards	1	5
Stardust Awards	3	7
BIG Star Entertainment Awards	1	4
IIFA Awards	0	1
Asiavision Awards	2	2
Indian Film Festival of Melbourne	1	1
ETC Bollywood Business Awards	1	1
Others	9	12

Totals (Note: Certain award groups do not simply award one winner. They acknowledge several different recipients, have runners-up, and have third place. Since this is a specific recognition and is different from losing an award, runner-up mentions are considered wins in this award tally. For simplification and to avoid errors, each award in this list has been presumed to have had a prior nomination.)
- Wins: 20
- Nominations: 45

Sonam Kapoor is an Indian actress who appears predominantly in Hindi films. Kapoor is the recipient of 20 accolades into her credit. She has received a National Film Award Special Mention for her performance in the biographical thriller film Neerja and Best Actress at the Indian Film Festival of Melbourne including a nomination at the IIFA Awards for Best Actress. She has received a Filmfare nomination for Best Female Debut for her debut film Saawariya and won the Stardust Award for Superstar of Tomorrow Female for the same.

Kapoor received her first Best Actress nomination at the Filmfare Award for her critically acclaimed performance in the romantic drama film Raanjhanaa (2013) which made her established actress. She has further received Six Screen Awards and Five Zee Cine Awards nominations respectively. Kapoor latter went on to star in her biggest commercial success the romantic musical film Prem Ratan Dhan Payo under the direction of Barjatya and the comedy Dolly Ki Doli both (2015) which made her she won the Most Entertaining Actress in a Romantic Role at BIG Star Entertainment Awards for the former.

== Awards and nominations ==
Year	Work	Award	Category	Result	Ref.
2008	Saawariya	Filmfare Awards	Best Female Debut	Nominated	
2008	Saawariya	Screen Awards	Most Promising Newcomer	Nominated	
2008	Saawariya	Zee Cine Awards	Best Female Debut	Nominated	
2008	Saawariya	Stardust Awards	Superstar of Tomorrow – Female	Won	
2010	Delhi-6	Asian Film Awards	Best Newcomer	Nominated	
2010	Delhi-6	Screen Awards	Best Actress (Popular Choice)	Nominated	
2010	Delhi-6	Stardust Awards	Superstar of Tomorrow – Female	Nominated	
2011	I Hate Luv Storys	Stardust Awards	Best Actress in a Comedy or Romance	Nominated	
2012	Thank You	Stardust Awards	Best Actress in a Comedy or Romance	Nominated	
2012	None	Zee Cine Awards	International Icon – Female	Nominated	
2014	Raanjhanaa	BIG Star Entertainment Awards	Most Entertaining Actor in a Social/Drama Film – Female	Nominated	
2014	Raanjhanaa	Screen Awards	Best Actress (Popular Choice)	Nominated	
2014	Raanjhanaa	Filmfare Awards	Best Actress	Nominated	
2014	Raanjhanaa	Zee Cine Awards	Best Actress	Nominated	
2015	Khoobsurat	Stardust Awards	Best Actress in a Comedy or Romance	Won	
2015	Khoobsurat	BIG Star Entertainment Awards	Most Entertaining Actor in a Comedy Film – Female	Nominated	
2015	Khoobsurat	Screen Awards	Best Actress (Popular Choice)	Nominated	
2015	Khoobsurat	Filmfare Awards	Best Actress	Nominated	
2015	Prem Ratan Dhan Payo	BIG Star Entertainment Awards	Most Entertaining Actor in a Drama Role – Female	Nominated	
2015	Prem Ratan Dhan Payo	BIG Star Entertainment Awards	Most Entertaining Actor in a Romantic Role – Female	Won	
2016	Dolly Ki Doli	Filmfare Awards	Best Actress	Nominated	
2016	Dolly Ki Doli	Screen Awards	Best Actress	Nominated	
2016	Neerja	Indian Film Festival of Melbourne	Best Actress	Won	
2016	Neerja	Asiavision Awards	Icon of the Year	Won	
2016	Neerja	Asiavision Awards	Best Actress	Won	
2016	Neerja	Star Screen Awards	Best Actress	Nominated	
2016	Neerja	Stardust Awards	Editor's Choice Best Actress of the Year	Won	
2016	Neerja	Stardust Awards	Viewer's Choice Best Actress of the Year	Nominated	
2017	Neerja	Filmfare Awards	Best Actress	Nominated	
2017	Neerja	Filmfare Awards	Best Actress (Critics)	Won	
2017	Neerja	Zee Cine Awards	Best Actress (Critics)	Nominated	
2017	Neerja	Zee Cine Awards	Best Actress	Nominated	
2017	Neerja	National Film Awards	Special Mention	Won	
2017	Neerja	International Indian Film Academy Awards	Best Actress	Nominated	
2019	None	Zee Cine Awards	Extraordinary Icon for Social Change	Won	
2019	Veere Di Wedding Sanju	ETC Bollywood Business Awards	Highest Grossing Actress	Won	

== Other recognitions ==
Year	Award / Organisation	Category	Result	Ref.
2011	Hello! (magazine)	Face of the Year	Won	
2013	Vogue Beauty Awards	Beauty of the Year	Won	
2013	GQ Men of the Year Award	Woman of the Year	Won	
2014	Filmfare Glamour And Style Awards	Trendsetter of the Year	Won	
2014	Filmfare Glamour And Style Awards	Most Stylish Star (Female)	Won	
2015	Filmfare Glamour And Style Awards	Most Stylish Star (Female)	Won	
2016	Filmfare Glamour And Style Awards	Red Carpet Royalty	Won	
2017	Filmfare Glamour And Style Awards	Most Stylish Star (Female)	Won	
2018	Filmfare Glamour And Style Awards	Most Stylish Star (Female)	Won	
