= Sonam Kapoor =

Indian former actress (born 1985)

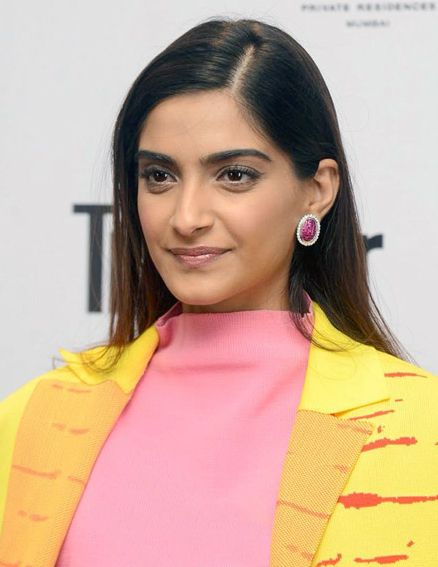
- Kapoor in 2017
- Born: 9 June 1985 (age 41); Mumbai, Maharashtra, India
- Occupation: Actress
- Years active: 2007–2023
- Spouse: Anand Ahuja (m. 2018)
- Children: 2
- Father: Anil Kapoor
- Relatives: Surinder Kapoor family
- Awards: Full list

Sonam Kapoor Ahuja (pronounced [soːnəm kəˈpuːr]; born 9 June 1985) is an Indian former actress who worked in Hindi films. Known for portraying the lives of ordinary Indian women, she is also cited in the media as a fashion icon. She has received several awards, including a National Film Award and a Filmfare Award. Kapoor appeared in Forbes India's Celebrity 100 list from 2012 to 2016.

The daughter of actor Anil Kapoor, Sonam began her career as an assistant director on filmmaker Sanjay Leela Bhansali's 2005 film Black. She made her acting debut in Bhansali's romantic drama Saawariya (2007), a box office flop, and had her first commercial success with the romantic comedy I Hate Luv Storys (2010). This was followed by a series of commercial failures and repetitive roles, which garnered her negative reviews. The 2013 box office hit Raanjhanaa marked a turning point in Kapoor's career, garnering her praise and Best Actress nominations at several award ceremonies.

Kapoor had her biggest commercial successes with supporting roles in the biopics Bhaag Milkha Bhaag (2013) and Sanju (2018), and a leading role in the romance Prem Ratan Dhan Payo (2015); the last two rank among the highest-grossing Bollywood films. Her acclaimed portrayal of Neerja Bhanot in the 2016 biographical thriller Neerja won her the National Film Award – Special Mention and a Filmfare Award for Best Actress (Critics), and she followed it with a starring role in the 2018 female buddy film Veere Di Wedding, both of which rank among the highest-grossing female-led Hindi films. This was followed by two poorly received female-led films and a hiatus.

Kapoor supports the raising awareness of breast cancer and LGBT rights. Known in the media for her outspoken personality, Kapoor is often a subject of social media trolling. She is married to the businessman Anand Ahuja, with whom she has two sons.

== Early life and background ==
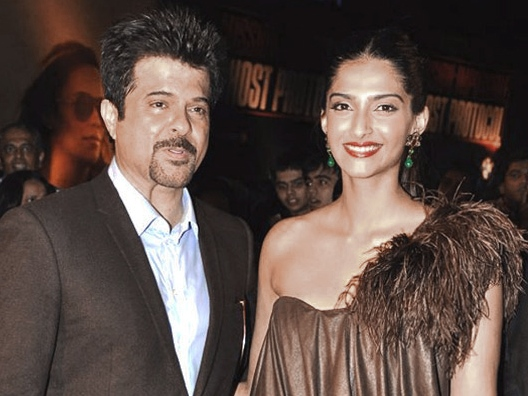
Kapoor with her father Anil Kapoor at a film's screening in Mumbai, 2011

Kapoor was born in the Chembur, Bombay (present-day Mumbai) on 9 June 1985. Her father is actor and producer Anil Kapoor, the son of the late filmmaker Surinder Kapoor and the founder of the Anil Kapoor Films Company. Her mother, Sunita, is a former model and designer. Kapoor has two younger siblings: film producer Rhea and brother Harsh Varrdhan. She is the niece of film producer Boney Kapoor and actor Sanjay Kapoor; actress Sridevi and producer Mona Shourie (Boney's wives) were her aunts. Kapoor's paternal cousins are actors Arjun Kapoor, Janhvi Kapoor, Khushi Kapoor and Mohit Marwah, and actor Ranveer Singh is her maternal second cousin.

The family moved to the suburb of Juhu when Kapoor was one month old. She was educated at the Arya Vidya Mandir school in Juhu, where she confessed to being a "naughty" and "carefree" child who would bully the boys. She excelled at sports such as rugby and basketball, and trained in Kathak, classical music and Latin dance. Kapoor, who practices Hinduism, states that she is "quite religious", and that it is a way of "reminding myself that I need to be thankful for so much".

Kapoor's first job was as a waitress at age 15, although it lasted only a week. As a teenager, she struggled with her weight: "I had every issue related to weight that I could have. I was unhealthy, I had bad skin, and I had hair growing on my face!" Kapoor was diagnosed with insulin resistance and polyendocrine metabolic ovarian syndrome (PMOS), and has since begun an initiative to increase awareness of diabetes. Kapoor enrolled at the United World College of South East Asia in Singapore for her pre-university education, where she studied theatre and arts. She has said she later started courses in economics and political science through University of Mumbai correspondence programme, after returning from University of East London where she began her bachelor's degree in the same subjects but returned to Mumbai soon after she began. Actress Rani Mukerji, a family friend, visited her family in Singapore on holiday while working on Black (2005). Kapoor, who had originally wanted to be a director and writer, expressed a desire to work as a crew member on the film. On her father's recommendation to director Sanjay Leela Bhansali, she was appointed as his assistant.

== Career ==
=== Early work and struggles (2007–2012) ===
During the production of Black, Kapoor developed an interest in acting when Bhansali professed that he wanted to cast her in the lead in his next film, Saawariya. She was advised to lose weight; at the time, she weighed about 80 kilograms (180 lb). Motivated by Bhansali's confidence in her, she lost 35 kilograms (77 lb) in two years. Kapoor studied acting with Roshan Taneja, Jayati Bhatia and Feroz Abbas Khan, and has cited actresses Waheeda Rehman and Nutan as influences, admiring their "path-breaking films ... [and] quality of doing different things".

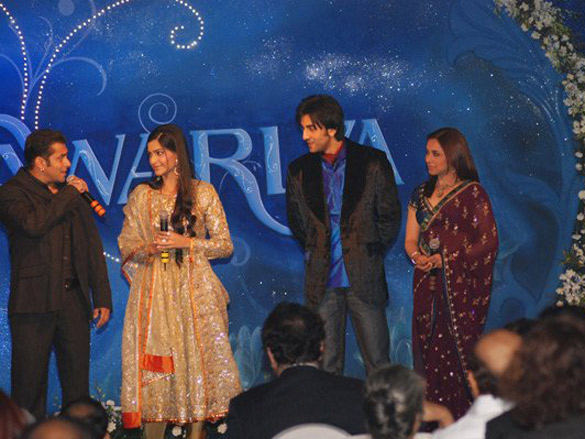
Kapoor with Ranbir Kapoor, Rani Mukerji & Salman Khan at the audio launch of her debut film Saawariya in 2007

Released in 2007, Saawariya saw Kapoor play a Muslim woman awaiting the return of her lover opposite Mukerji, Ranbir Kapoor and Salman Khan. It was the first Indian feature film produced by a Hollywood studio, Sony Pictures Entertainment. Saawariya proved to be a major critical and commercial failure. Writing for BBC, Jaspreet Pandohar called the film a "misfire-on-a-massive-scale". Raja Sen of Rediff.com described her laugh as "almost as infectious as her father's", but wished that she had been "allowed to simper softly, instead of having a clearly overdubbed plastic giggle plastered onto her." The film earned her a Filmfare Award for Best Female Debut nomination and the Stardust Award for Superstar of Tomorrow – Female.

In 2009, Kapoor played an aspiring singer opposite Waheeda Rehman and Abhishek Bachchan in the Rakeysh Omprakash Mehra-directed social drama Delhi-6. The film received mixed reviews from critics and was a box-office failure. CNN-IBN's Rajeev Masand referred to Kapoor as a "revelation", writing that she was "a firecracker, instinctive and uninhibited in what isn't even a conventional female lead". Sonia Chopra of Sify described Kapoor as an "earnest and effortless performer", and found her character likeable, despite the "typical Delhi-girl recipe".

Kapoor's first release in 2010 was Punit Malhotra's romantic comedy I Hate Luv Storys, opposite Imran Khan. She played an engaged woman who develops a one-sided attraction to her commitment-phobic co-worker. Khan said about Kapoor's craft, "We'd be shooting a scene from multiple angles—for three or four hours you're doing the same scene, the same lines—and here is this person [Kapoor] who brings consistency to her work, from the way she talks, to her accent." Although Shubhra Gupta of The Indian Express called Kapoor's performance "stiff and rehearsed", Daily News and Analysis' Johnson Thomas found her "likeable and believable". I Hate Luv Storys was Kapoor's first commercial success, earning ₹725.2 million (US$7.7 million) worldwide.

Kapoor next played the eponymous role in Aisha, an ensemble romantic comedy-drama based on Jane Austen's novel Emma, which was produced by her sister Rhea. She described her character as "a meddlesome busybody with a passion for matchmaking and playing Cupid". Aisha also starred Abhay Deol, Ira Dubey, Cyrus Sahukar, Amrita Puri, Anand Tiwari, Arunoday Singh and Lisa Haydon. An Indo-Asian News Service reviewer thought that Kapoor had stood out in the ensemble with her performance, making "the best of a rather rare opportunity for an Indian leading lady to be part of a Bollywood film that salutes Victorian mores and Delhi's elitist affectations in one clean cool sweep".

In 2011, Kapoor starred in Thank You, a comedy about three women who teach a lesson to their philandering husbands. The film, along with Kapoor's performance, received poor reviews; Nikhat Kazmi of The Times of India called her "terribly out of sync". She then played the romantic interest of Shahid Kapoor in the Pankaj Kapur-directed romantic drama, Mausam, which was also poorly received. Despite doubts about her acting ability, critic Saibal Chatterjee of NDTV thought Kapoor conveyed "the essential vulnerability of a girl forever under duress, bringing out just the right mix of feminine fragility and native resolve". The following year, Kapoor played a computer hacker opposite Abhishek Bachchan, Neil Nitin Mukesh and Bipasha Basu in the Abbas–Mustan-directed heist film, Players, a remake of 2003's The Italian Job. Her role was originally written for Katrina Kaif, who was unavailable for the film. Although journalists had high expectations, it failed commercially, and Sukanya Verma of Rediff.com remarked derogatively that Kapoor "truly entertains with her childish attempt to pass off as a gold-medalist hacker". Kapoor's string of poorly received films began to hinder her career.

=== Breakthrough (2013–2015) ===
Kapoor's role in the Anand L. Rai-directed romantic drama Raanjhanaa (2013) marked a turning point in her career; Geety Sahgal called it her best performance to date in The Indian Express. Kapoor's role was that of Zoya Haider, a young Muslim student from Varanasi who is drawn into politics after the murder of her Sikh lover. To prepare for her part, Kapoor interacted with students, attended workshops and practised with theatre groups associated with Jawaharlal Nehru University. She also studied Jaya Bachchan's work in Guddi (1971), which she felt was "perfect" for her role. Discussing her character in the film, Kapoor described her approach to acting: "I have always tried to do different films and ... I try to be different for every character. I like doing different things to challenge myself in every way and don't like to repeat myself." Although Raanjhanaa received mixed-to-positive reviews, her performance was praised; Rajeev Masand wrote that she "does some of her best work here, going smoothly from innocent to manipulative to cynical, without ever losing Zoya's inherent vulnerability". With worldwide earnings of over ₹1 billion (US$11 million), Raanjhanaa was a commercial success and Kapoor received her first nomination for the Filmfare Award for Best Actress.

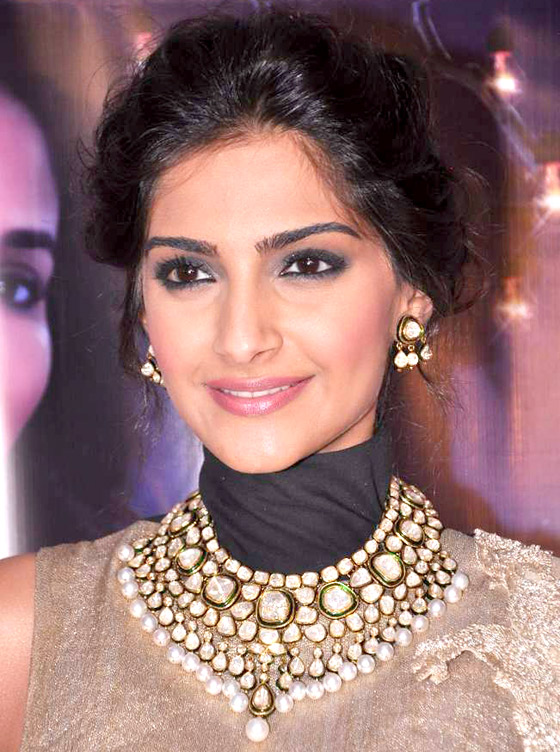
Kapoor promoting Raanjhanaa on Jhalak Dikhhla Jaa in 2013

Kapoor followed the success of Raanjhanaa with a brief appearance in Bhaag Milkha Bhaag (2013), a biopic on athlete Milkha Singh. She received ₹11 (12¢ US) for the film, made on a budget of ₹300 million (US$3.2 million), citing her admiration for director Rakeysh Omprakash Mehra and the film itself as reasons for her appearance. Critically praised, Bhaag Milkha Bhaag was one of the top-grossing Bollywood films of the year. Critic Sarita A. Tanwar wrote in her review that despite her minor role, Kapoor proved to "be the perfect warm counterpart to Milkha". Both Raanjhanaa and Bhaag Milkha Bhaag received Filmfare Award for Best Film nominations, the latter of which won.

In 2014, Kapoor portrayed the banker Mayera Sehgal opposite Ayushmann Khurrana and Rishi Kapoor in the Yash Raj Films comedy-drama Bewakoofiyaan, in a role which film critic Anupama Chopra found to be poorly written and an "uphill climb". She next starred with Fawad Khan in the romantic comedy Khoobsurat, an adaptation of the 1980 film of the same name, playing the role which had originally been given to Rekha. Though she received a Filmfare Best Actress nomination for her performance, critics were divided in their response, with Shilpa Jamkhandikar of Reuters calling her "loud and exasperating", and Andy Webster of The New York Times comparing her to a young Anne Hathaway and highlighting her "Julia Roberts-like smile". Later that year, she met entrepreneur-model Sahir Berry on a social media network, and began a romantic relationship with him, although they broke up a few months later.

In 2015, Kapoor starred as a runaway bride in Dolly Ki Doli, a heist comedy co-starring Pulkit Samrat, Rajkummar Rao and Varun Sharma. Mint's Udita Jhunjhunwala criticised Kapoor's performance in the film, writing that her "range is too limited to bring alive a character that may have had heaps of potential on paper". Shubhra Gupta wrote: "Kapoor is in almost every frame, and should have filled them all. But the treatment of the character shows up her limitations." Despite the negative reviews for her performance, she was nominated for the Filmfare Award for Best Actress. While filming Sooraj R. Barjatya's Prem Ratan Dhan Payo with Salman Khan in Gondal, Gujarat in February 2015, Kapoor was diagnosed with swine influenza, from which she recovered the following month. Kapoor portrayed Rajkumari Maithili Devi, a princess looking for love. The film became one of the highest-grossing Bollywood films of all time. She was praised by Rachit Gupta for her credibility as a royal, and Komal Nahta thought that the role was significant enough to be a turning point in her career. However, she won a Golden Kela Award for Worst Actress.

=== Female-led films (2016–2018) ===
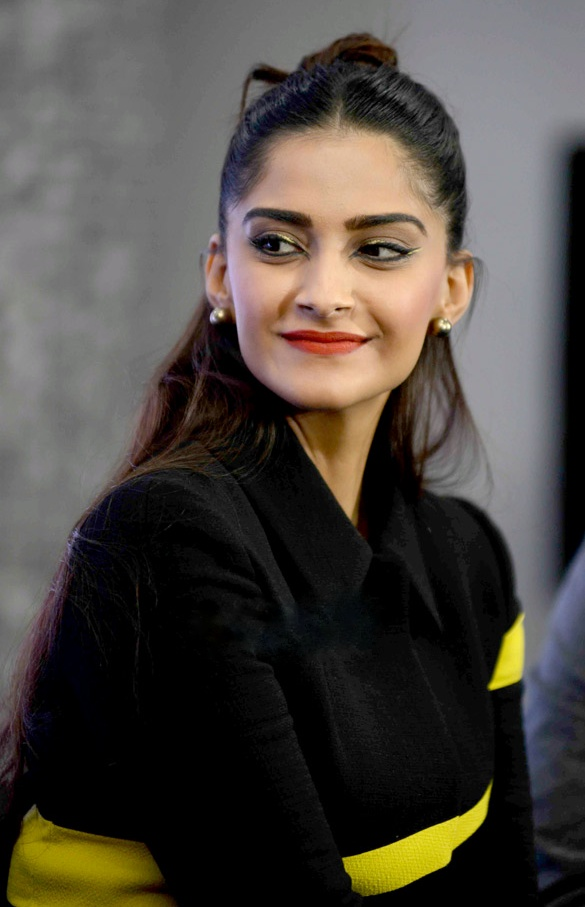
Kapoor at an event for Neerja in 2016. Her performance in the film won her a National Film Award – Special Mention and a Filmfare Best Actress (Critics).

Following an appearance in the music video of Coldplay's "Hymn for the Weekend" (featuring Beyoncé), Kapoor starred in Ram Madhvani's biographical thriller Neerja (2016). She was cast as the eponymous air hostess Neerja Bhanot, who died while saving the passengers of the hijacked Pan Am Flight 73 in 1986. Kapoor felt responsible towards the project because it is about real events, and met Bhanot's family as a preparation for her role. The film garnered high critical acclaim, and several commentators considered Kapoor's performance to be her best to date. Raja Sen found her performance to be career-defining, while Hindustan Times' Rohit Vats wrote that "she carries [the film] entirely on her shoulder. She looks earnest, scared, benevolent and bold, all at the same time." Sen listed Kapoor as the best actress in Hindi cinema in 2016, while Rajeev Masand invited her to his annual best actresses roundtable. In addition to several other accolades, Kapoor won a National Film Award – Special Mention and a Filmfare Best Actress (Critics), in addition to a Filmfare Best Actress nomination. With a worldwide gross over ₹1.35 billion (US$14 million), Neerja emerged as one of the highest-grossing Bollywood films featuring a female protagonist.

After a two-year absence from the screen, Kapoor played a social worker in R. Balki's comedy-drama Pad Man (2018), based on a short story in Twinkle Khanna's book The Legend of Lakshmi Prasad. Co-starring Akshay Kumar and Radhika Apte, the film is inspired by the life of Arunachalam Muruganantham, who campaigned for menstrual hygiene in rural India. Kapoor said that the length of the role is of little importance to her as long as the film has "relevance beyond just having a good time at the movies". She liked featuring in a film that addresses important social issues and is about something more than just entertainment. Although finding her role to be "largely superfluous", Saibal Chatterjee wrote that Kapoor "makes the most of the limited opportunity"; Anna M. M. Vetticad of Firstpost commended her screen presence but disliked a romantic subplot involving her and Kumar, criticising the chemistry and age-gap between them.

In June 2018, she featured in Shashanka Ghosh's Veere Di Wedding, a female buddy film co-starring Kareena Kapoor, Swara Bhaskar and Shikha Talsania. Namrita Joshi of The Hindu found the film formulaic and clichéd, while Sweta Kaushal of Hindustan Times thought the film had "style but no soul" and was partly impressed with Kapoor's performance. With earnings of over ₹1.34 billion (US$14 million), the film proved to her second top-grossing Hindi film not featuring a well-known male star. Later that month, Kapoor featured in Rajkumar Hirani's biopic of Bollywood actor Sanjay Dutt, entitled Sanju, as one of Dutt's love interests. Kapoor said that despite her brief role, she agreed to the project to work with Hirani and to reunite with Ranbir Kapoor after her debut. Anna M. M. Vetticad criticised the film's attempt to whitewash Dutt's misdeeds, but found Kapoor's portrayal of her small role "sweet". On the other hand, Rajeev Masand called the film "consistently engaging", and wrote that Kapoor "hit the right notes as Sanjay Dutt's [partner]". Sanju broke several box-office records, becoming one of the highest-grossing Indian films.

=== Career fluctuations and hiatus (2019–2023) ===
In 2019, Kapoor starred in the coming-of-age film Ek Ladki Ko Dekha Toh Aisa Laga (as Sonam K Ahuja), co-starring her father, Juhi Chawla, and Rajkummar Rao. She played a closeted lesbian who has trouble coming out to her conservative family. She agreed to the project to break stereotypes about same-sex relationships in India. Critics were encouraging of its positive representation of homosexuality, but it failed to do well commercially. Kapoor next starred in Abhishek Sharma's film adaptation of Anuja Chauhan's romantic comedy novel The Zoya Factor, in which she played the titular character of a clumsy woman who becomes a lucky charm for the Indian cricket team. Ankur Pathak of HuffPost was appreciative of her comic timing but bemoaned that "she's out of depth in scenes that require her to exhibit more emotion".

A thriller she had shot for in Scotland in 2020, named Blind, a remake of the 2011 Korean film of the same name, marked her acting comeback. It released digitally on JioCinema in July 2023. Shubhra Gupta dismissed her performance as "wholly ineffective" in a "deadly dull film".

== Personal life ==
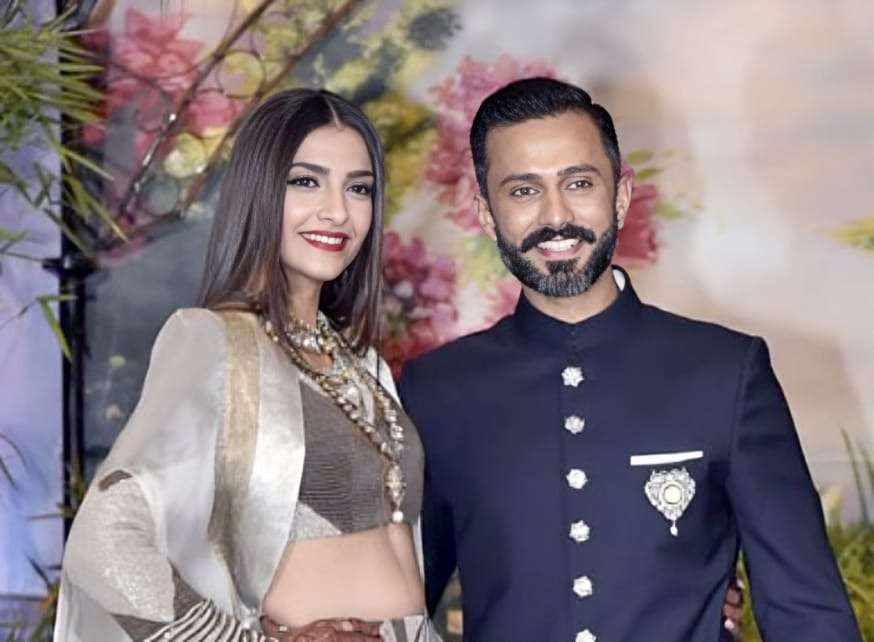
Kapoor with husband Anand Ahuja at their wedding reception in 2018

Kapoor started practicing vegetarianism in 2015 during the filming of Prem Ratan Dhan Payo and Neerja. She was named as "The Person of the Year" by the People for the Ethical Treatment of Animals (PETA) in 2018. However, she later switched back to non-vegetarianism.

Kapoor has always been guarded about her personal life. She was linked to Punit Malhotra, her director from I Hate Luv Storys in 2010. Though she never admitted, they were spotted together by the media. They later broke up in 2013.

Kapoor married British businessman Anand Ahuja on 8 May 2018 in a traditional Sikh ceremony in Bandra, Mumbai. In August 2022, Kapoor gave birth to a son. She has since said, "I will try to do the best I can as a mother, which means that acting will definitely take a backseat, but I don't think I will ever stop working completely". She gave birth to their second son in March 2026.

== In the media ==
Born into a prominent actor family, Kapoor has appeared in the media from an early age, and is one of the highest-paid actresses in Bollywood. After the success of Raanjhanaa and Bhaag Milkha Bhaag she was cited by Subhash K. Jha as one of the top actresses in India, though a commentator for Rediff.com notes that several of her films have been commercial failures. In 2009 she was the first Indian actress to appear on The Hollywood Reporter's "Next Generation: Asia Class", a list of newcomers in film. Outspoken publicly, Kapoor's comments about contemporaries and others in the Indian film industry have occasionally caused controversy. In a 2015 interview, she acknowledged that her opinions often get her into trouble, but remarked that "I believe it pays to be honest in the longer run".

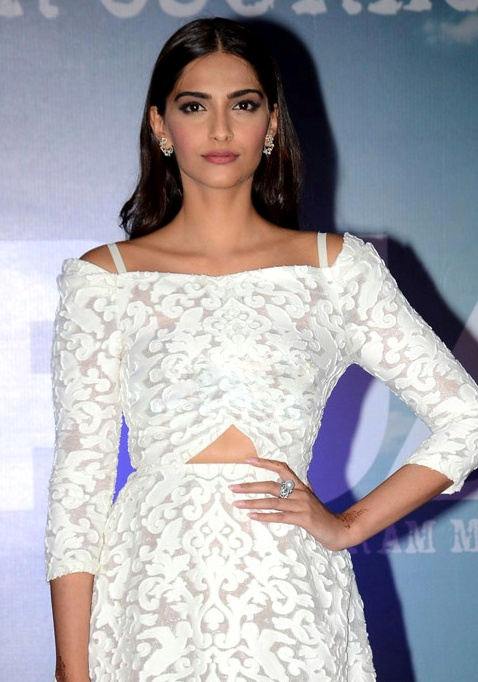
Kapoor in 2017

Kapoor is a popular figure nationally, with a significant following on Twitter and Facebook since 2009. She appeared on The Huffington Post's list of "100 most influential women on Twitter" in 2015. She has been described by the media as a style icon, and featured on Rediff.com's list of "Bollywood's Best Dressed Actresses" in 2012 and 2013. In 2013, the newspaper Hindustan Times and Indian edition of Vogue called her Style Icon (Reader's Choice) and Beauty of the Year, respectively. Though Kapoor has earned praise for her dress sense and style, she has faced some criticism for wearing traditional Indian dresses.

Kapoor was ranked seventh on The Times of India's 2010 "Most Desirable Woman" list, placing 14th, 28th and 14th the next three years, and was in the top ten of UK magazine Eastern Eye's "World's Sexiest Asian Women" list from 2011 to 2014. In 2012 and 2013 she also held 48th and 45th place, respectively, on the Indian edition of Forbes' "Celebrity 100" lists, based on the income and popularity of Indian celebrities. She was named Woman of the Year by the men's magazine GQ India in 2013. In 2014 and 2015, Kapoor reached 31st place and 26th position, respectively, peaking at the 18th position the following year with an annual income of ₹200 million (US$2.1 million). Kapoor has acquired several titles at the Filmfare Glamour and Style Awards—in 2015 she won for Most Stylish Star (Female) and Absolut Elyx Style & Substance Award, and in 2016, she was named Most Stylish Star (Female) and Red Carpet Royalty.

As well as endorsing brands such as Colgate, Electrolux, Lux, Mont Blanc, Oppo Mobile, Salvatore Ferragamo S.p.A. and Signature, Kapoor is the Indian ambassador for international cosmetics manufacturer L'Oréal. In 2011, she was named Brand Ambassador of the Year at the NDTV Good Times Gadget Guru Awards. Rediff.com reported in 2012 that she received ₹30 million (US$320,000) for each endorsement, making her one of the highest-paid celebrity endorsers in India. In 2020, Kapoor was among several Bollywood actors who were called out for posting Instagram messages showing solidarity with the Black Lives Matter movement, despite their previous work advertising skin-lightening products which perpetuate colorism.

In October 2023, Kapoor sent a legal notice to a YouTuber with 7,000 subscribers for making a joke about her. Kapoor was criticised across the social media spectrums for this action that was deemed unwarranted.

== Activism ==
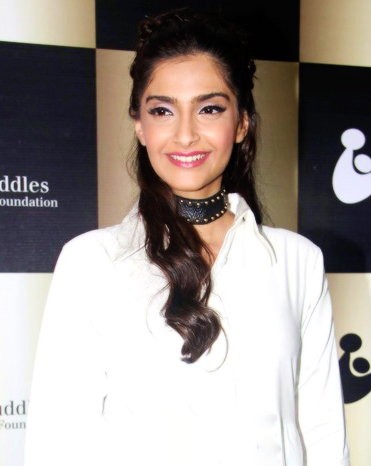
Kapoor attends a Cuddles Foundation fundraiser in August 2016

Kapoor has supported charitable organisations for various causes. In 2009, she participated in the International Indian Film Academy Awards fashion show, which supports widows and orphans of Indian film-industry workers. On behalf of People for the Ethical Treatment of Animals (PETA) she wrote to Maharashtra Home Minister R. R. Patil, protesting against the use of glass-coated manja (used on fighter kites), which kills birds who become entangled in it. In 2018, however, she attracted some controversy when she declared her support for Salman Khan upon his conviction for hunting an endangered blackbuck, despite her previous criticism of trophy hunting.

In 2012, Kapoor asked fans to donate to the Ogaan Cancer Foundation for her birthday, and collaborated with the foundation to increase awareness of breast cancer. She is also the brand ambassador for the Elle Breast Cancer Campaign. Kapoor is vocal in her support for LGBT rights in India. She launched the trailer of the film, Sisak, India's first silent gay love story, through her Twitter account in January 2017.

Kapoor auctioned some of her clothes on stylist Pernia Qureshi's online fashion boutique, Pernia's Pop-Up Shop, in 2012. The proceeds were donated to Smile Foundation, a child-welfare organisation. In 2014, she attended a charitable art exhibition organised by the Rouble Nagi Art Foundation, and donated clothing and accessories to a website raising funds for In Defense of Animals. Kapoor walked the ramp in a 2015 fashion show by Manish Malhotra for the Mijwan Welfare Society, a non-profit organisation dedicated to empowering girls. The same year, she appeared with Hrithik Roshan in the music video for "Dheere Dheere", whose profits were donated to charity. In 2017, she hosted a dinner to raise funds for children suffering from cancer.

== Filmography ==
=== Films ===
Year	Title	Role	Notes
2007	Saawariya	Sakina	
2009	Delhi-6	Bittu Sharma	
2010	I Hate Luv Storys	Simran	
2010	Aisha	Aisha Kapoor	
2011	Thank You	Sanjana Malhotra	
2011	Mausam	Aayat Rasool	
2012	Players	Naina Braganza	
2013	Bombay Talkies	Herself	Special appearance in song "Apna Bombay Talkies"
2013	Raanjhanaa	Zoya Haider	
2013	Bhaag Milkha Bhaag	Biro	
2014	Bewakoofiyaan	Mayera Sehgal	
2014	Khoobsurat	Dr. Mrinalini "Milli" Chakravarty	
2015	Dolly Ki Doli	Dolly	
2015	Prem Ratan Dhan Payo	Rajkumari Maithili Devi	
2016	Neerja	Neerja Bhanot	
2018	Pad Man	Pari Walia	
2018	Veere Di Wedding	Avni Sharma	
2018	Sanju	Ruby	
2019	Ek Ladki Ko Dekha Toh Aisa Laga	Sweety Chaudhary	
2019	The Zoya Factor	Zoya Singh Solanki	
2020	AK vs AK	Herself	Cameo appearance
2023	Blind	Gia Singh	

=== Music videos ===
Year	Title	Artist
2015	"Dheere Dheere"	Honey Singh
2016	"Hymn for the Weekend"	Coldplay

== Awards and nominations ==
Kapoor has received six Filmfare Awards nominations, and has won one — Best Actress - Critics for Neerja.
