= Sisak (disambiguation) =

Sisak is a city in central Croatia.

Sisak may also refer to:

- Şuşca, a Romanian village called Sisak in Hungarian, in the Pojejena commune
- Sisak (eponym), a legendary figure in Armenian history
- Sisak (film), a 2017 short film

== See also ==
- Shishak
