= Sanjay Kapoor =

Indian actor (born 1965)

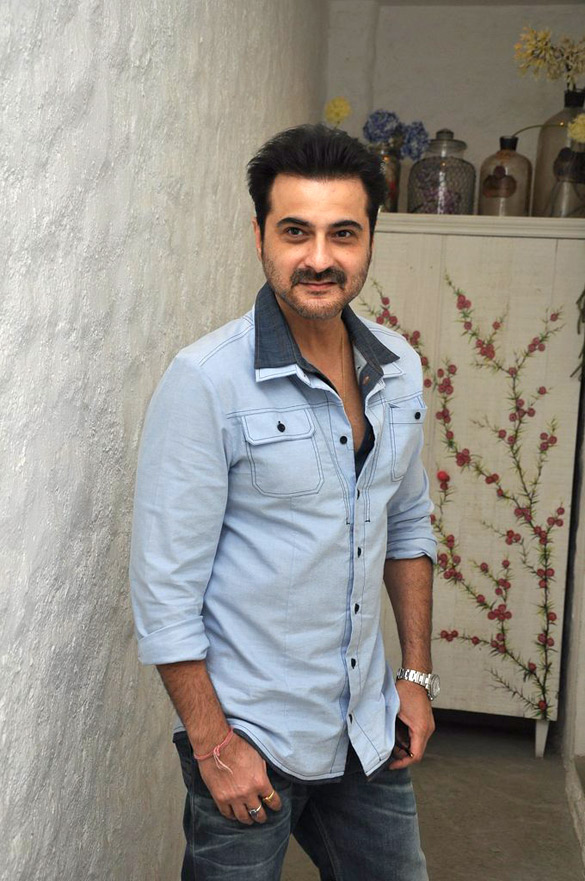
- Kapoor in 2011
- Born: 17 October 1965 (age 60); Bombay, Maharashtra, India
- Occupations: Actor; film producer
- Years active: 1995–present
- Spouse: Maheep Kapoor (m. 1997)
- Children: 2
- Father: Surinder Kapoor
- Relatives: See Surinder Kapoor family

Sanjay Surinder Kapoor (born 17 October 1965) is an Indian actor and producer who works primarily in Hindi film and television. Born to producer Surinder Kapoor, Kapoor made his acting debut with Prem (1995) and had his breakthrough with Raja, in the same year.

Kapoor went onto appear in several films as a lead, most successful of which was Sirf Tum (1999). Following unsuccessful films and a hiatus, Kapoor earned praises for his portrayal in the television series Dil Sambhal Jaa Zara (2017–2018) and the web series, The Gone Game (2020–2022) and The Fame Game (2022). Kapoor's other notable films include Shakti: The Power (2002), Luck by Chance (2009), Seetharama Kalyana (2019), Mission Mangal (2019), Merry Christmas (2024) and Murder Mubarak (2024).

Kapoor is the founder and director of Sanjay Kapoor Entertainment Private Limited. He is married to entrepreneur Maheep Kapoor, with whom he has two children.

== Early life and background ==
Kapoor was born on 17 October 1965 in Mumbai, to Nirmal Kapoor and film producer Surinder Kapoor, into a Punjabi Hindu family which embraces Arya Samaj teachings. He is the youngest of four children. His elder brothers are Boney Kapoor, a film producer and Anil Kapoor, an actor. Actress Sridevi and the producer Mona Shourie Kapoor, both Boney's wives, were his sisters-in-law, and Sandeep Marwah, founder of the Noida Film City and owner of Marwah Studios, is his brother-in-law, married to his sister Reena Marwah. Actors Sonam Kapoor, Arjun Kapoor, Janhvi Kapoor, Khushi Kapoor, Mohit Marwah and Harshvardhan Kapoor, and film producer Rhea Kapoor are his nephews and nieces. Prithviraj Kapoor, patriarch of the Kapoor family, was his father's cousin.

== Career ==
=== Film ===
Kapoor made his debut in Hindi cinema in 1995 with the movie Prem, opposite newcomer Tabu. Although both debutants rendered fairly decent performances, the movie was delayed for many years as it was in production since 1989. Sanjay was 30 when it finally released, the press then dismissively calling him Hindi industry's "oldest newcomer." It bombed at the box office. Kapoor's next movie was Raja (1995) opposite Madhuri Dixit which was a box office success. He went on to star in several films as a lead actor such as Auzaar (1997), Mohabbat (1997) and Sirf Tum (1999). Apart from the moderately successful Chhupa Rustam: A Musical Thriller (2001) he didn't have much success as a lead actor as most of his films failed at the box office. In 2002, he appeared as a villain playing the psychotic husband of Esha Deol in Koi Mere Dil Se Poochhe. His performance was praised by critics.

He started playing supporting roles in films like Qayamat: City Under Threat (2003), Julie (2004), Luck By Chance (2009) and Shaandaar (2015).

He turned to producing with his first production Tevar starring his nephew Arjun Kapoor releasing in 2015. He played a cameo appearing alongside his brother Anil for the first time in Mubarakan (2017).

In early 2018, Sanjay was cast in the anthology film Lust Stories as a lead character opposite actress Manisha Koirala. In the same year, he was cast in the movie The Zoya Factor as his real life niece Sonam Kapoor's on screen father, and in 2019 in the Kannada film Seetharama Kalyana. In 2020, he appeared in a short film Sleeping Partner opposite actress Divya Dutta.

=== Television and web career (2003–present) ===
He made his debut on television in 2003 appearing in the television serial Karishma – The Miracles of Destiny opposite Karisma Kapoor.

In 2017, he was cast in Vikram Bhatt's television serial Dil Sambhal Jaa Zara opposite Smriti Kalra. The show is about a man marrying a girl much younger than him and how they try to make their marriage work.

In 2018, he landed a role in ALTBalaji's web series Soggy Hoga Tera Baap as Chiraag Arora. In 2019, it was announced that Sanjay eventually opted out of Ekta Kapoor's project, choosing instead Amazon Prime series The Last Hour, which released in 2021, playing the role of DCP Arup Singh.

In 2020, he appeared in The Gone Game, a psychological thriller miniseries on Voot, as Rajeev Gujral. In 2022, he appeared in the Netflix web show The Fame Game as Nikhil More, opposite Madhuri Dixit.

== Personal life ==
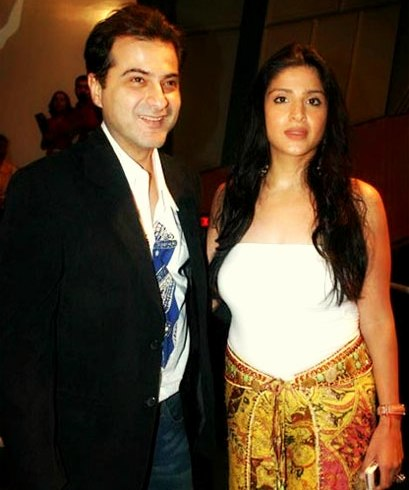
Kapoor with his wife Sandhu

Kapoor married his longtime girlfriend and entrepreneur Maheep Sandhu in December 1997. The couple has two children, daughter Shanaya (born 1999) and son Jahaan (born 2005). Shanaya is also an actor, who made her debut with Aankhon Ki Gustaakhiyan (2025).

== Filmography ==
=== Films ===
Year	Title	Role	Notes	Ref.
1995	Prem	Shantanu / Sanjay "Sanju" Verma		
1995	Raja	Raja Patangwala		
1995	Kartavya	Karan Singh		
1996	Beqabu	Raja Verma		
1997	Mohabbat	Gaurav M. Kapoor		
1997	Auzaar	Yash Thakur		
1997	Zameer: The Awakening of a Soul	Kishan		
1997	Mere Sapno Ki Rani	Vijay Kumar		
1999	Sirf Tum	Deepak		
2001	Chhupa Rustam	Raja / Nirmal Kumar Chinoy		
2002	Koi Mere Dil Se Poochhe	Dushyant Singh		
2002	Soch	Raj Matthews		
2002	Shakti: The Power	Shekhar		
2003	Qayamat: City Under Threat	Abbas Ramani		
2003	Darna Mana Hai	Sanjay		
2003	Kal Ho Naa Ho	Abhay Malhotra	Cameo appearance	
2003	LOC: Kargil	Maj. Deepak Rampal		
2004	Jaago	Shrikant		
2004	Julie	Rohan		
2005	Anjaane	Aditya Malhotra		
2006	Unns: Love...Forever	Rahul Malhotra		
2007	Dosh			
2007	Om Shanti Om	Himself		
2009	Luck By Chance	Ranjit Rolly		
2009	Kirkit	I.M. Romeo		
2010	Prince	Ali Khan		
2014	Kahin Hai Mera Pyar	Rahul Kapoor		
2015	Shaandaar	Harry Fundwani		
2015	Mumbhaii – The Gangster			
2017	Mubarakan	Avtar Singh Bajwa	Cameo appearance	
2018	Lust Stories	Salman Ahmad	Dibakar Banerjee's segment	
2019	Seetharama Kalyana	Dr. Shankar	Kannada film	
2019	Mission Mangal	Sunil Shinde		
2019	The Zoya Factor	Vijayendra Singh Solanki		
2020	Sleeping Partner	Sahay	Short film	
2023	Bloody Daddy	Hameed Shaikh		
2024	Merry Christmas	Ronnie Fernandes		
2024	House of Lies	Rajveer Singh Chaudhary		
2024	Murder Mubarak	Rannvijay Singh		
2025	Sikandar	Nisha's father		
2025	Param Sundari	Parmeet Sachdev		
2025	Raat Akeli Hai: The Bansal Murders	Rajesh Bansal		

=== Television ===
Year	Title	Role	Notes	Ref.
2003–2004	Karishma – The Miracles of Destiny	Amar		
2017–2018	Dil Sambhal Jaa Zara	Anant Mathur		
2020–2022	The Gone Game	Rajeev Gujral		
2020–present	Fabulous Lives of Bollywood Wives	Himself		
2021	The Last Hour	DCP Arup Singh		
2022	The Fame Game	Nikhil More		
2023	Made in Heaven	Ashok Malhotra	Episode: "And They Lived Happily Ever After"	
2026	Sankalp	Prashant Singh		

=== Producer ===
Year	Title	Ref.
2015	Tevar	

== Awards and nominations ==
Year	Award	Category	Work	Result	Ref.
2010	Screen Awards	Best Ensemble Cast	Luck by Chance	Won	
