= Tevar =

2015 Indian film by Amit Sharma

- Theatrical poster
- Directed by: Amit Ravindernath Sharma
- Written by: Shantanu Shrivastava
- Screenplay by: Amit Ravindernath Sharma
- Story by: Gunasekhar
- Based on: Okkadu by Gunasekhar
- Produced by: Baban Jangid Nimbla; Sanjay Kapoor; Sunil Lulla; Naresh Agarwal; Sunil Manchanda
- Starring: Arjun Kapoor; Sonakshi Sinha; Manoj Bajpayee
- Cinematography: Laxman Utekar
- Edited by: Dev Rao Jadhav
- Music by: Songs: Sajid–Wajid; Guest Composer: Imran Khan; Background Score: Clinton Cerejo
- Production companies: Sanjay Kapoor Entertainment Pvt.Ltd; MAD Entertainment; Naresh Agarwal Films
- Distributed by: Eros International
- Release date: 9 January 2015
- Running time: 159 minutes
- Country: India
- Language: Hindi
- Budget: est. ₹54 crore
- Box office: est. ₹56 crore

Tevar (transl. Attitude) is a 2015 Indian Hindi-language action film directed by debutante Amit Ravindernath Sharma and produced by Boney Kapoor, Sanjay Kapoor, Sunil Lulla, Naresh Agarwal and Sunil Manchanda, based on an adapted script by Sharma and Shantanu Shrivastav. An official remake of the 2003 Telugu film Okkadu, the film stars Arjun Kapoor and Sonakshi Sinha, and Manoj Bajpayee. Shruti Haasan makes a special appearance in an item number, while also providing playback vocals for a song. The film was released worldwide on 9 January 2015.

== Plot ==
Ghanshyam "Pintoo" Shukla is a young Kabaddi player from Agra who goes to factionism-hit Mathura to take part in practice. In a twist of fate, he saves a civilian, Radhika Mishra, from a goon, Gajendar Singh, a dangerous faction leader, who is in love with Radhika and wants to marry her against her wishes. Pintoo tries to comfort her because Gajendar Singh killed her brother Mahesh. When he saves Radhika, he humiliates Gajendar into taking his pants off. Gajendar refuses to put them back on until someone finds Radhika and brings her back. Pintoo helps Radhika escape and takes her to his house in Agra, hiding her in his room with the help of his sister, Pinky.

Soon, his parents find out she is hiding in their house. Radhika and Pintoo run away again, and she falls in love with him. The next day, after taking care of Gajendar and his men, Pintoo and his friends drop Radhika off at the airport to go to America. Radhika cries on the way there, not wanting to leave Pintoo. They bring her parents to see her one last time before she leaves. After Radhika passes airport security, Pintoo realizes he loves Radhika. She shows up behind him, saying that she was waiting for him to stop her. She turns to leave when Pintoo is silent, taking it as a refusal, but Pintoo calls her back, and they confirm their love with a hug.

Pintoo's police chief father, SP Ravikant Shukla, and Gajendar show up at the airport, and Ravikant arrests him while Gajendar takes Radhika away. While under Gajendar's jurisdiction, Radhika taunts him and claims that Pintoo will definitely return for her. Gajendar goes to the jail and asks Pintoo to come with him. Here, Pintoo and Ravikant solve their issues when Ravikant expresses that he's not worried Pintoo will come home hurt; rather, he's worried for Gajendar.

Gajendar and his men injure Pintoo in front of the whole town. Home Minister Mahender Singh, who is the reason Gajendar has not gotten in trouble all this time, tells him to stop making a scene, as he's ruining his political party, but Gajendar slaps Mahender and goes on to fight Pintoo. He is further enraged when he sees how much Radhika loves Pintoo, and he stabs him with a knife. Pintoo falls to the ground. Radhika tries to run to him, crying his name, but Gajendar drags her away. Pintoo is able to get up again, picking up the scarf that Radhika dropped. He ties it around his waist, where the knife wound is, and fights and defeats Gajender's men. He also defeats Gajender until he gets back up with a gun. However, he is shot down by Kakdi, his own right-hand man, on the instructions of Mahender, who has had enough of Gajender's antics and insubordination. It is implied that Kakdi has now been appointed as Gajender's replacement. With Gajender dead, his goons have no interest in Pintoo and Radhika, who are now reunited.

== Cast ==
- Arjun Kapoor as Ghanshyam "Pintoo" Shukla
- Sonakshi Sinha as Radhika Mishra
- Manoj Bajpayee as Gajendar Singh
- Gunjan Malhotra as Pinky
- Rajesh Sharma as Home Minister Mahender Singh
- Subrat Dutta as Kakdi
- Raj Babbar as SP Satyaprakash Shukla
- Deepti Naval as Pintoo's Mother
- Mahendra Mewati as Mahesh Kumar Mishra, Radhika's brother
- Bhuvan Arora as Ghonsla, Pintoo's friend
- Tushar Pandey as Bhatura, Pintoo's Friend
- V K Sharma as Radhika's father
- Bhagwan Tiwari as Jagdish Chaudhary
- Shruti Haasan as an Item dancer in the song "Madamiyan" (special appearance)

== Production ==
In November 2013, it was reported that Arjun Kapoor and Sonakshi Sinha had joined an upcoming untitled film that was being produced by Boney Kapoor. On 10 December 2013, the film was titled Tevar and it was revealed that Kapoor will play the role of a college student from Agra, who is a Kabaddi champion. On 17 December 2013 it was announced that Sanjay Kapoor will be producing the film, and that Amit Sharma will be making his directorial debut. Manoj Bajpayee also joined the film on 30 December.

=== Filming ===
Filming began on 21 January 2014 at Sambhar Lake in Jaipur, Rajasthan. The film's shooting continued in different locations including Mumbai, Maheshwar, Agra, Mathura, Pandharpur at river side of Chandrabhaga and also in Haridas ves in Pandharpur (Solapur, Maharashtra) Akluj (Solapur, Maharashtra) (Khargone, Madhya Pradesh).

== Soundtrack ==
Tevar

Soundtrack album by: Sajid–Wajid; Imran Khan
- Released: 10 December 2014
- Genre: Feature Film Soundtrack
- Label: Eros Music

Sajid–Wajid chronology
Daawat-e-Ishq (2014)	Tevar (2014)	Dolly Ki Doli (2015)
External audio
- Audio Jukebox - Part 1 on YouTube
- Audio Jukebox - Part 2 on YouTube

Imran Khan chronology
Tevar (2015)

The soundtrack was composed by the duo Sajid–Wajid. Pakistani-Dutch singer Imran Khan made his Bollywood debut with this film. The lyrics were written by Kausar Munir, Danish Sabri, Sajid and Imran Khan. Prior to the soundtrack's full release, "Superman" was released as the lead single, followed by "Let's Celebrate".

Actress Shruti Haasan, who makes a special appearance in the music video of the song "Madmiyan", additionally sang the song "Joganiyan".

=== Track listing ===
No.	Title	Lyrics	Music	Singer(s)	Length
1.	"Superman"	Kausar Munir, Danish Sabri, Sajid	Sajid–Wajid	Wajid	04:37
2.	"Radha Nachegi"	Kausar Munir, Danish Sabri	Sajid–Wajid	Ritu Pathak, Shabab Sabri, Danish Sabri	06:32
3.	"Let's Celebrate"	Imran Khan	Imran Khan	Imran Khan	03:17
4.	"Joganiyan"	Kausar Munir	Sajid–Wajid	Shruti Haasan
5.	"Madmiyan"	Kausar Munir	Sajid–Wajid	Mika Singh, Mamta Sharma
6.	"Main Ni Jaana Pardes"	Kausar Munir (Based on original folk poetry by Bulleh Shah)	Sajid–Wajid (Recreated from an original Pakistani composition by Shafqat Amanat Ali)	Shafqat Amanat Ali
7.	"Superman (Remix)"	Kausar Munir, Danish Sabri, Sajid	Sajid–Wajid	Wajid
8.	"Tevariffic (Mashup)"	Kausar Munir, Danish Sabri, Sajid	Sajid–Wajid	Arjun Kapoor, Wajid, Ritu Pathak, Shabab Sabri, Danish Sabri, Imran Khan, Shruti Haasan, Mika Singh, Mamta Sharma, Shafqat Amanat Ali

== Reception ==
Raja Sen of Rediff gave the film 1/5 stars and wrote, "And since one can’t, in all good conscience, let anyone stray into Gangs Of Jockeypur, consider yourselves warned. Stay away" Saurabh Dwivedi of India Today said, "The film becomes a watch because of its power packed dialogues written by Shantanu Shrivastava."
