= Blind (2023 film) =

Indian Hindi film by Shome Makhija

- Official release poster
- Directed by: Shome Makhija
- Based on: Blind by Choi Min-seok
- Produced by: Sujoy Ghosh; Avishek Ghosh; Hyunwoo Thomas Kim; Sachin Nahar; Pinkesh Nahar; Manish W Jyoti Deshpande
- Starring: Sonam Kapoor; Purab Kohli; Vinay Pathak; Lillete Dubey
- Cinematography: Gairik Sarkar
- Edited by: Tanupriya Sharma
- Music by: Clinton Cerejo; Brianca Gomes
- Production companies: Jio Studios; Kanai; AVMA; Kross Pictures; Lead Films; RV Motion Pictures
- Distributed by: JioCinema
- Release date: 7 July 2023
- Running time: 124 minutes
- Country: India
- Language: Hindi

Blind is a 2023 Indian Hindi-language crime thriller film directed by Shome Makhija and produced by Sujoy Ghosh, Avishek Ghosh, Hyunwoo Thomas Kim, Sachin Nahar, Pinkesh Nahar and Manish W. The film features Sonam Kapoor in a leading role with Purab Kohli, Vinay Pathak and Lillete Dubey in supporting roles. Blind, a remake of the 2011 Korean film of the same name, centres around a blind police officer in search of a serial killer. The principal photography began on 28 December 2020 in Glasgow, Scotland and wrapped up on 13 February 2021. The film premiered on 7 July 2023 on JioCinema and was heavily panned by critics and audiences. It marks the last film role of Kapoor till date.

== Plot ==
The film follows the story of Gia Singh, who travelled to her mother's house one gloomy night. She was waiting for a Taxi, but instead of a taxi, a private car picks her up. But the car driver was not a common man; he was a psycho kidnapper who kidnaps the ladies and badly tortures them to death. Recently, some cases were filed in the police station for missing women, and followed by that, the sensible blind lady Gia Singh's sixth sense gave her doubt; she also stated the same to the police, but the COP took Gia lightly.

The missing cases were handled by the detective Prithvi. In this film, he uncovers that this was not an ordinary kidnapping spree; but it was a interconnected series of serial abductions.

Assisted by Gia Singh, how Prithvi unravels the dark secrets and expose the malevolent orchestrator, forms the crux of the film.

== Cast ==
- Sonam Kapoor as Gia Singh
- Purab Kohli as a driver turned serial killer
- Vinay Pathak as Prithvi Khanna
- Lillete Dubey as Maria Aunty
- Shubham Saraf as Nikhil
- Danesh Razvi as Adrian Pereira
- Javed Khan as DCS Tarun Bedi

== Reception ==
Blind received negative reviews from critics and audiences.

Grace Cyril of India Today rated it 2 out of 5 stars and stated "Blind was supposed to be dark and full of jump scares, but you get none. This crime thriller is stuck in the same rut."

Shubhra Gupta of The Indian Express rated it 1 out of 5 stars and said "This could have been a respectable thriller, but there is zero chill factor here."

Mayur Sanap of Rediff.com rated it 1.5 stars out of 5 and stated "Sadly, under debutant Shome Makhija's skimpy writing and direction, this Hindi remake falls considerably short to warrant a riveting watch."

Anuj Kumar of The Hindu reviewed the movie and highlighted "There is hardly any surprise element in writer-director Shome Makhija's straitjacketed adaptation of a Korean flick."

Titas Chowdhury of News18 rated 3 out of 5 stars and said "Blind isn't the spiffiest crime thriller. It has its own flaws. It's gory, gloomy and grim."

Monika Rawal Kukreja of Hindustan Times reviewed the movie and stated "If you are a sucker for thrillers, watch Blind for you should know what a poorly executed thriller looks like."

Bollywood Hungama rated it 2 out of 5 and said "On the whole, BLIND rests on the performances and some thrilling moments. But it fails to impress due to its length and several loopholes in the script."

Chandhini R of Cinema Express reviewed the movie and said "Blind, with its potential and the advantage of drawing from the source material, had the opportunity to embrace a redemptive light. However, it failed due to a lack of effectiveness and coherence in the narrative and not striking the right emotional chord with the audience."

Saibal Chatterjee of NDTV gave it 2 out of 5 stars and said "The deeper ideas that the film touches upon are buried under the strictly generic nature of the narrative. Blind, bland and perfunctory, does not have the eye to see beyond the surface."

Pratikshya Mishra of The Quint said "The makers don't seem to respect their protagonists enough to give them the intellect to fight their enemy; they're all so easily swayed and lured."

Reya Mehrotra of The Week gave it 2 out of 5 stars and said "Blind, the Hindi remake of the Korean movie of the same name, rushes through the storyline without giving enough time and space to its characters."

Rishil Jogani of Pinkvilla also rated it 2 out of 5 stars and said "Blind is a dull thriller that neither engages nor entertains. Despite being a remake of the acclaimed Korean thriller-drama going by the same name, it isn't able to come any close to it."

Priyanka Roy of The Telegraph said "These are touches that are sure to make a movie buff break into a knowing smile. If only the rest of Blind was as clever. Or at least, mildly engaging."

== Production ==
The principal photography commenced on 28 December 2020 in Scotland. The film was wrapped up on 13 February 2021.
