= Boney Kapoor =

Indian film producer

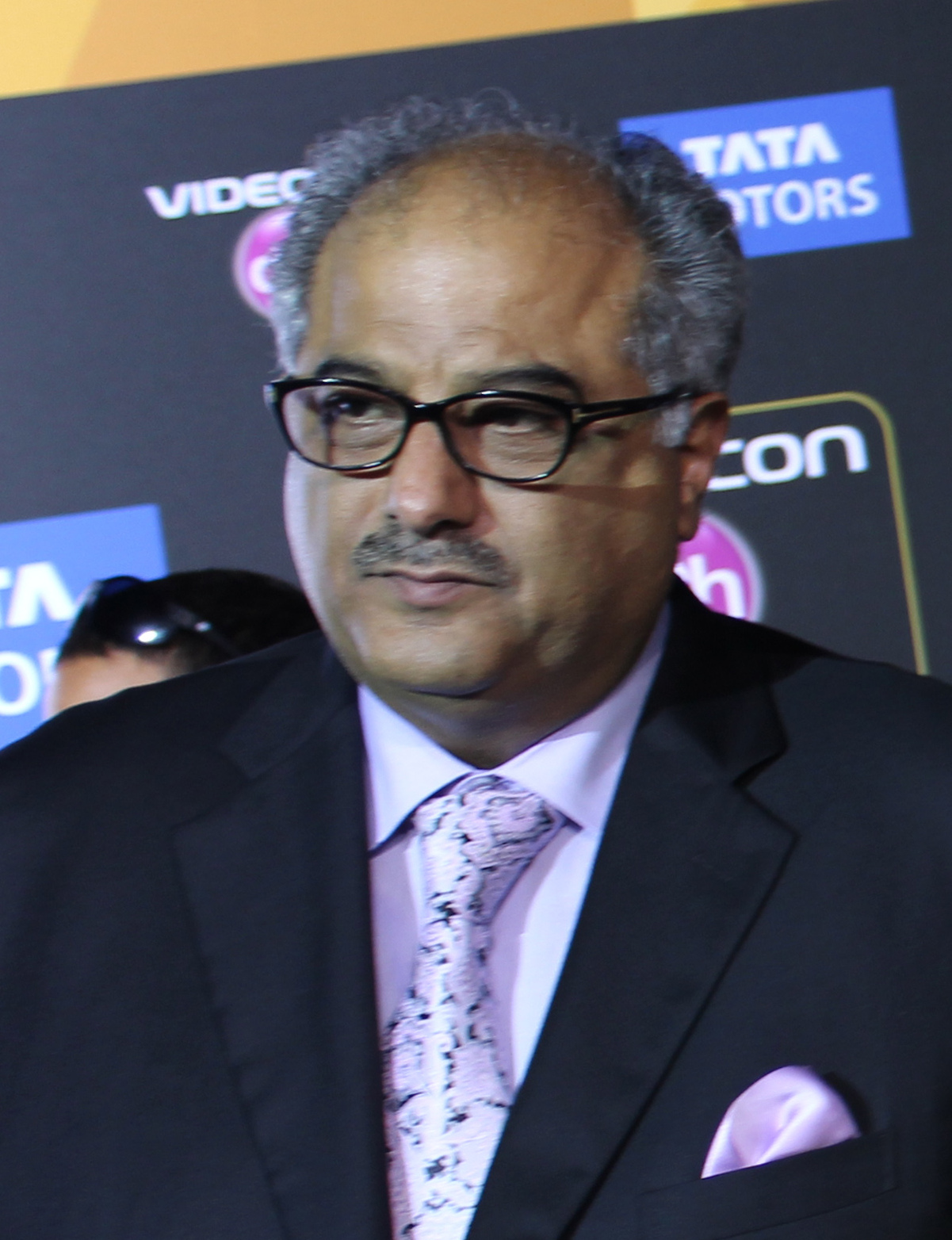
- Kapoor in 2014
- Born: Achal Surinder Kapoor; 11 November 1953 (age 72); Meerut, Uttar Pradesh, India
- Occupation: Film producer
- Years active: 1979–present
- Spouses: Mona Shourie (m. 1983; div. 1996); Sridevi (m. 1996; died 2018)
- Children: 4 (inc. Arjun, Janhvi and Khushi)
- Father: Surinder Kapoor
- Family: Surinder Kapoor's family

Achal Surinder "Boney" Kapoor (born 11 November 1953) is an Indian film producer primarily associated with Hindi cinema, in addition to Tamil and Telugu cinema.

== Early life and education ==
Kapoor was born as Achal Surinder Kapoor to Bollywood film producer Surinder Kapoor on 11 November 1953, in Meerut, Uttar Pradesh, his father having to move out of their ancestral home in Peshawar (now Khyber Pakhtunkhwa, Pakistan) due to the 1947 partition. Born into a Punjabi Hindu family, he had an Arya Samaji upbringing. His younger brothers Anil and Sanjay are both actors and producers.

Kapoor was educated at the Our Lady of Perpetual Succour High School and St Xavier's College, Mumbai.

== Production career ==
=== Early career ===
At 20, Kapoor apprenticed with editor Kamlakar Karkhanis, who has worked as an editor on several films directed by Manmohan Desai. He started his career working under legends like Shakti Samanta, whose The Great Gambler (1979) helped him learn editing and where he also had a small and uncredited acting role as a body double for Amitabh Bachchan. Despite this early foray into the film industry, Kapoor initially had no interest in movies, and was looking to seek his professional career in a yarn-trading company.

=== Mr. India (1987) ===
The most famous film produced by him remains the Shekhar Kapur directed sci-fi film Mr India starring his brother Anil Kapoor and his future wife Sridevi. It was the second biggest hit of 1987 and remains a cult classic in India. The film was known for several of its lines and songs, including Sridevi's "Miss Hawa Hawaii" performance and Amrish Puri's quote "Mogambo khush hua" ('Mogambo is pleased', although the literal translation is 'Mogambo became happy', it's a very awkward construct and hence the humour), which is one of the most famous quotes of Bollywood and has become synonymous with Puri.

Laxmikant–Pyarelal's music performed well too, especially the song "Hawa Hawaii" which is very popular till today. Mr India has often been featured in lists of top Bollywood films. Indiatimes Movies ranks the movie amongst the Top 25 Must See Bollywood Films. This was the last film that the duo Salim-Javed wrote together. They had split up earlier in 1982, but came back for one last film. It was remade in Tamil as En Rathathin Rathame, starring K. Bhagyaraj. in Kannada as Jai Karnataka, starring Ambareesh. On the centenary of Indian cinema, Mr. India was declared one of the 100 Greatest Indian Films of All Time. Described by Rediff as "one of the most iconic films of its time", it became one of the highest grossing hits of 1987. and also found a place in Hindustan Times list of 'Top 10 Patriotic Films of Hindi Cinema'.

=== Other productions in the 1980s and the 1990s ===
His other early productions include Hum Paanch which played a key role in establishing actors like Mithun Chakraborty and Amrish Puri in Bollywood. Kapoor also launched many big stars of the Hindi film industry. His production Woh Saat Din launched brother Anil Kapoor, Prem launched younger brother Sanjay Kapoor and Tabu, and Koi Mere Dil Se Poochhe launched actress Esha Deol. He produced one of the most expensive films in the history of Hindi cinema: Roop Ki Rani Choron Ka Raja in 1993. In 1997, he produced the box office hit Judaai starring Sridevi and Anil together yet again with Urmila Matondkar.

Kapoor was managing brother Anil's career well until 1999 and in 2000 he produced Pukar starring Anil, Madhuri Dixit, Namrata Shirodkar, Danny Denzongpa and Om Puri. The film was critically acclaimed and a moderate success at the box office. It won two National Film Awards, including the Nargis Dutt Award for Best Feature Film on National Integration and the National Film Award for Best Actor for Anil Kapoor's performance.

=== Company (2002) ===
In 2002, he produced Company directed by Ram Gopal Varma starring Ajay Devgan, Mohanlal, Manisha Koirala, Vivek Oberoi, and Antara Mali. It is a fictional exposé of the Mumbai underworld, loosely based on the Indian mafia organisation D-Company, known to be run by Dawood Ibrahim. The film received positive reviews from critics as well as audience and won six out of the eleven awards it was nominated for at the Filmfare Awards. The film received critical acclaim at the 2004 Austin Film Festival and New York Asian Film Festival.

It is the second film in the Gangster series and a sequel to the film Satya. It was followed by a sequel, D. Film critic Rajeev Masand has labelled it (along with its prequel Satya) one of the "most influential movies of the past ten years." Company marked the introduction of a new genre of film making, a variation of film noir that has been called Mumbai noir.

=== Later 2000s hits ===
His 2004 film Run starring Abhishek Bachchan was a box office failure but has since achieved a cult status for its comedy scenes, especially the "Kauwa Biryani" scene starring Vijay Raaz. Following this, he produced the comedy film No Entry that became Bollywood's biggest hit of 2005. It gained a lot of popularity grossing ₹430 million (equivalent to ₹1.6 billion or US$17 million in 2026).

In 2009, Kapoor produced Wanted starring Salman Khan. The film broke many records at the box office upon release, due to Khan's comeback. Wanted was the second highest-grossing Bollywood film of 2009. It had an excellent opening, grossing ₹440 million (equivalent to ₹1.2 billion or US$13 million in 2026) in the first week. It shattered records in Pakistan, grossing over ₹1.75 billion (equivalent to ₹4.8 billion or US$50 million in 2026) in its first weekend, which was a record for any Indian film. It grossed ₹1.01 billion (equivalent to ₹2.8 billion or US$29 million in 2026) in India and ₹260.6 million (equivalent to ₹720 million or US$7.4 million in 2026) overseas.

=== South Indian productions ===
He acquired the Tamil and Telugu remake rights of 2016 Hindi film Pink. He produced the Tamil version of the film in 2019 as Nerkonda Paarvai, which became a critical and commercial success. Later in 2021, he produced the Telugu version of the film along with Dil Raju of Sri Venkateswara Creations as Vakeel Saab starring Pawan Kalyan, Anjali, Nivetha Thomas and Ananya Nagalla in lead roles. The film is the highest opener in India post the COVID-19 pandemic, netting over ₹380 million (equivalent to ₹470 million or US$4.8 million in 2026) on its first day. Both the films are his debut into Tamil and Telugu cinema respectively (although he had previously worked in Telugu films both of his previous films were bilinguals).

== Other work ==
=== Acting ===
In 2023, he made his acting film debut in Tu Jhoothi Main Makkaar, playing the supporting role of Ranbir Kapoor's father.

=== Cricket ===
Boney Kapoor also has an interest in cricket. He is the owner of the Bengal Tigers in the Celebrity Cricket League.

== Personal life ==
Kapoor was married to Mona Shourie from 1983 to 1996 and the couple has two children, Arjun Kapoor (born 1985) and Anshula (born in 1990). Arjun made his acting debut in the 2012 movie Ishaqzaade while Anshula graduated from Barnard College.

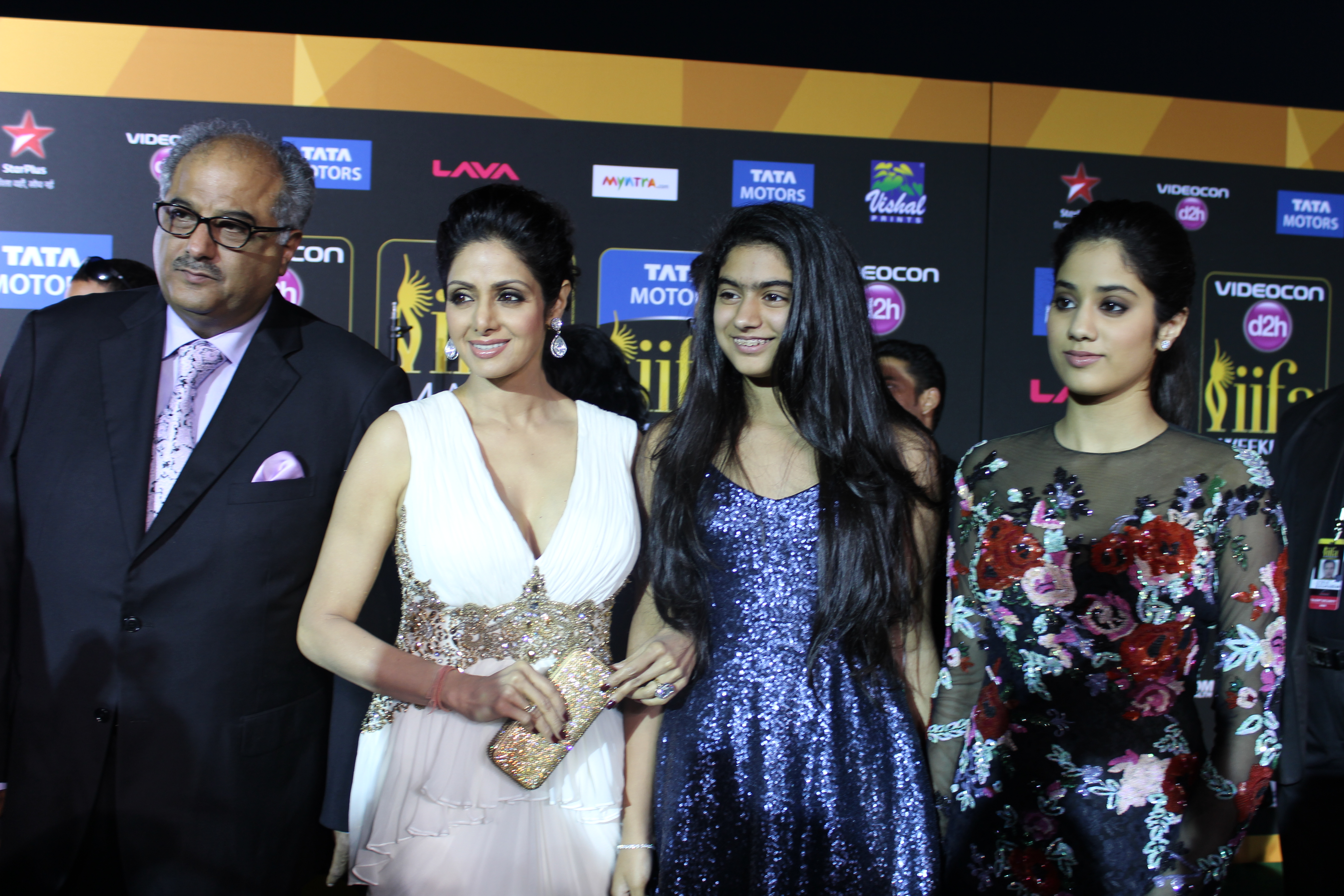
(From left) Kapoor with his wife Sridevi, and daughters Kushi and Janhvi

Kapoor married Indian actress Sridevi on 2 June 1996. The couple had two daughters, Janhvi Kapoor (born 6 March 1997) and Khushi Kapoor (born 5 November 2000). On 24 February 2018, Sridevi died in Dubai after drowning in her hotel bathtub. The Kapoor family of Prithviraj Kapoor are also his distant relatives as Prithviraj was Surinder's cousin.

== Filmography ==
Year	Film	Language	Notes
1980	Hum Paanch	Hindi	Remake of Paduvaaralli Pandavaru
1983	Woh Saat Din	Hindi	Remake of Andha 7 Naatkal
1987	Mr. India	Hindi	
1992	Raat / Raatri	Hindi; Telugu	
1992	Drohi / Antham	Hindi; Telugu	
1993	Roop Ki Rani Choron Ka Raja	Hindi	
1995	Prem	Hindi	
1996	Loafer	Hindi	Remake of Velai Kidaichuduchu
1997	Judaai	Hindi	Remake ofSubhalagnam
1999	Sirf Tum	Hindi	Remake of Kadhal Kottai
2000	Pukar	Hindi	
2000	Hamara Dil Aapke Paas Hai	Hindi	Remake of Pelli Chesukundam
2002	Koi Mere Dil Se Poochhe	Hindi	Remake of Pelli
2002	Company	Hindi	
2002	Shakti	Hindi	Remake of Anthapuram
2003	Khushi	Hindi	Remake of Kushi
2004	Run	Hindi	Remake of Run
2004	Kyun...! Ho Gaya Na	Hindi	
2005	Bewafaa	Hindi	
2005	No Entry	Hindi	Remake of Charlie Chaplin
2009	Wanted	Hindi	Remake of Pokiri
2010	Milenge Milenge	Hindi	
2015	Tevar	Hindi	Remake of Okkadu
2017	Mom	Hindi	
2019	Nerkonda Paarvai	Tamil	Remake of Pink
2020	It's My Life	Hindi	Remake of Bommarillu
2021	Vakeel Saab	Telugu	Remake of Pink
2021	Jeet Ki Zid	Hindi	
2022	Valimai	Tamil	
2022	Nenjuku Needhi	Tamil	Remake of Article 15
2022	Veetla Vishesham	Tamil	Remake of Badhaai Ho
2022	Mili	Hindi	Remake of Helen
2023	Thunivu	Tamil	
2024	Maidaan	Hindi	

=== Acting ===
Year	Film	Role	Ref.
2020	AK vs AK	Himself	
2022	Naam Tha Kanhaiyalal	Himself	documentary
2023	Tu Jhoothi Main Makkaar	Ramesh Arora	

== Awards and nominations ==
Year	Award	Category	Work	Result	Ref.
1988	Star & Style Awards	Best Film	Mr. India	Won	
2006	51st Filmfare Awards	Best Film	No Entry	Nominated	
2006	7th IIFA Awards	Best Film	No Entry	Nominated	
2010	11th IIFA Awards	Best Film	Wanted	Nominated	
2010	Stardust Awards	Best Film – Thriller or Action	Wanted	Won	
