= The Gone Game =

2020 Indian psychological thriller series

- Created by: Nikhil Nagesh Bhat
- Written by: Radhika Anand; Nikhil nagesh Bhat; Ayesha Syed; Mautik Tolia
- Starring: Sanjay Kapoor; Arjun Mathur; Shweta Tripathi; Shriya Pilgaonkar; Lubna Salim
- Composers: Nayan Tara Bhatkal; Aditya N.
- Country of origin: India
- Original languages: Hindi; English
- No. of seasons: 2
- No. of episodes: 9

Production
- Animator: Manish Mistry
- Editor: Manish Mistry
- Camera setup: Single-camera
- Running time: 30–35 minutes

Original release
- Network: Voot
- Release: 20 August 2020 – 7 July 2022

The Gone Game is an Indian psychological thriller miniseries directed by Nikhil Nagesh Bhat, starring Sanjay Kapoor, Shweta Tripathi, Shriya Pilgaonkar and Arjun Mathur. It was shot almost entirely within the confines of their homes and directed remotely, during the COVID-19 pandemic in India. It premiered on Voot on 20 August 2020. The second season released on 7 July 2022.

== Plot ==
The series starts with Sahil's condition and visible symptoms of being COVID-19 positive. Later episodes try to showcase multiple threads and the plot line gets messier with each episode.

== Cast ==
- Sanjay Kapoor as Rajeev Gujral
- Shweta Tripathi as Amara Gujral
- Arjun Mathur as Sahil Gujral
- Shriya Pilgaonkar as Suhani Gujral
- Lubna Salim as Barkha Kapoor
- Rukhsar Rehman as Suneeta Gujral
- Dibyendu Bhattacharya as Subhash Chaudhary
- Indraneil Sengupta as Prateek Jindal
- Harleen Sethi as Sharmila Gupta (Season 2)

== Episodes ==
No.	Title	Directed by	Written by	Original release date
1	"Gone"	Nikhil Bhat	Radhika Anand, Nikhil Bhat, Ayesha Syed, Mautik Tolia	August 20, 2020
2	"The Trail"	Nikhil Bhat	Radhika Anand, Nikhil Bhat, Ayesha Syed, Mautik Tolia	August 20, 2020
3	"The Blood On Your Hand"	Nikhil Bhat	Radhika Anand, Nikhil Bhat, Ayesha Syed, Mautik Tolia	August 20, 2020
4	"Game Over"	Nikhil Bhat	Radhika Anand, Nikhil Bhat, Ayesha Syed, Mautik Tolia	August 20, 2020

== Reception ==
Jyoti Kanyal from India Today gave her review on the series at the same time appreciated the minimal production used for the shoot, and also wrote about the relatability of the series with the audience because of the COVID-19 pandemic. Rohan Naahar from Hindustan Times shared his mixed reviews, he acknowledged the strong cast, and praised the unique plot. Shubhra Gupta from The Indian Express stated the series as an interesting experiment and highlights one point which the series reflects clearly, that we are prisoners of our digital devices. Devasheesh Pandey from News 18 stated the series as a good representation of Covid-19 along with an interesting thriller plot.
