= Blind (2011 film) =

- Theatrical poster
- Hangul: 블라인드
- RR: Beullaindeu
- MR: Pŭllaindŭ
- Directed by: Ahn Sang-hoon
- Written by: Choi Min-seok
- Produced by: Andy Yoon
- Starring: Kim Ha-neul; Yoo Seung-ho; Jo Hee-bong
- Cinematography: Son Won-ho
- Edited by: Shin Min-kyung
- Music by: Song Jun-seok
- Production company: Moon Watcher
- Distributed by: Next Entertainment World
- Release dates: July 22, 2011 (PiFan); August 11, 2011 (South Korea)
- Running time: 111 minutes
- Country: South Korea
- Language: Korean
- Box office: $16.1 millions

Blind (Korean: 블라인드; RR: Beullaindeu) is a 2011 South Korean crime thriller film directed by Ahn Sang-hoon with screenplay by Choi Min-seok which won the "Hit By Pitch" project fair held by the Korean Movie Producers Guild in 2009. It stars Kim Ha-neul and Yoo Seung-ho. Kim received Best Actress honors at the 48th Grand Bell Awards and the 32nd Blue Dragon Film Awards for her performance.

== Plot ==
A missing person case involving a female university student and the victim in a hit and run case appears to be related. Detectives look for a witness.

Min Soo-ah used to be a promising cadet at the police academy. However, a horrific car accident which killed her fellow orphanage "brother' Dong-hyun caused her to lose her eyesight totally by retinal damage (her eyes look outwardly normal). Then her police career ended, supposedly not because of her blindness but because she left training and cuffed her brother to the car against procedure, which contributed to his death.

Soo-ah reveals to Detective Jo at the police station that on the night of the hit and run case, she was picked up by a taxi cab driver. Soo-ah believes the taxi driver may be the perpetrator of the crimes. Initially, Detective Jo doesn't take Soo-ah's claims seriously because she is blind, but when Soo-ah displays her acute senses, the detective starts to believe her.

Detective Jo and Soo-ah then work together to find the taxi cab driver, but all their leads turn up empty. Then another witness comes forward, Kwon Gi-seob. Gi-seob is a motorcycle delivery boy who claims to have also witnessed the hit and run incident. Gi-seob emphatically states that the car in question was not a taxi cab, but rather an imported sedan. Soo-ah realizes it must have been a hatchback because of the distinctive sound of the passenger rear window opening.

Meanwhile, Soo-ah finds herself being stalked by a mysterious man who turns out to be the killer, gynecologist Dr Choi Myung-jin. Soo-ah, while in the car with him, remembered that he had a strong scent, he had a watch on his right hand, and he gave her an iced coffee drink in a glass can. While in the car with him, they hit a bump while in an argument. The body of the dead university student rolls out of the trunk and Dr Choi gets out to examine it. When Soo-ah goes out as well to inspect the damage done, he claims that he hit a dog, but she reasons with him, starting another fight. He leaves her in the rain when another car comes. The reason she was in the car with him is because she mistook him for a taxi driver.

One night when Gi-seob is walking home alone, he is followed by Myung-jin. Gi-seob at first runs away, but is snuck up on and hit by a brick. An ambulance comes and Detective Jo and Soo-ah drive to the scene. Gi-seob gets annoyed by Soo-ah's constant nagging, and on the day of his release, storms out in anger. When he reaches the nearly-empty subway station, he sees Soo-ah on the other side and then sees her ride the subway followed by the killer. He calls her on her phone and tells her that the killer is in front of her. As he runs to catch up with her, she goes on FaceTime and shows him her location and surroundings. He guides her out of the subway and to safety, as well as her seeing eye dog, Seul-gi ("Wisey" in the English subtitles). She reaches into her handbag and sprays the killer's eyes with her pepper spray and runs off with Seul-gi. When she reaches the elevator, the killer quickly gets in with her and kills Seul-gi.

When Soo-ah wakes up, she asks for her seeing dog, but Gi-seob hands her the blood-stained leash. At home she gets a call from an unknown number. The caller warns her away from the case, claiming "You can't see me, but I'm watching you." A few days later, Detective Jo finds the killer. They get into a violent fight, in which the detective dies and the killer drives off. Meanwhile, Gi-seob and Soo-ah visit the orphanage again when they're asked to watch over it while the school director takes the children out. The killer enters the living room and lights a cigarette and listens to some music. Soo-ah, annoyed by the music, goes downstairs to turn it off. She reprimands Gi-seob for playing it, but smells the cigarette smoke. Gi-seob goes upstairs and fights the killer while Soo-ah runs away, reaching the car and breaking its windows with the motion sensor. The killer attacks her but she hits him on the head, making him fall unconscious. The police find Detective Jo's body and other evidence implicating Dr Choi Myung-jin as the killer, e.g. a two young women in his basement, one captive and the other dead. He is arrested and jailed. He had already served time for molesting patients when he was high.

Soo-ah is re-admitted to the police academy and graduates, while Gi-seob also enrolls in the police academy.

== Cast ==
- Kim Ha-neul as Min Soo-ah, a former policewoman
  - Kim Soo-jin as young Soo-ah
- Yoo Seung-ho as Kwon Gi-seob (spelled "Gi-sub" in the English subtitles), a motorcycle delivery boy
- Jo Hee-bong as Detective Jo (Cho in English subtitles)
- Yang Young-jo as Dr Choi Myung-jin
- Park Bo-gum as Dong-hyun, Soo-ah's late younger orphanage "brother"
  - Sung Yoo-bin as young Dong-hyun
- Dolly as guide dog Seul-gi (Wisey in the English subtitles)
- Sa-hee as Jung-yeon
- Kim Mi-kyung as school director
- Choi Phillip as detective from Information Section
- Won Pung-yeon as Detective 1
- Jeon Joo-woo as Detective 4
- Kim Kyeong-ik as Doctor 2
- Baek Ik-nam as owner of car
- Han Yeo-wool as woman having an abortion

== Reception ==
=== Critical reception ===
Derek Elley of Film Business Asia gave the film a 6 out of 10, saying it "has effective moments but doesn't fully realise its potential."

=== Awards ===
Year	Award	Category	Nominee	Result
2011	48th Grand Bell Awards	Best Actress	Kim Ha-neul	Won
2011	48th Grand Bell Awards	Best Supporting Actor	Jo Hee-bong	Nominated
2011	48th Grand Bell Awards	Best Screenplay	Choi Min-seok	Won
2011	48th Grand Bell Awards	Best Editing	Shin Min-kyung	Nominated
2011	48th Grand Bell Awards	Best Lighting	Shin Sang-yeol	Nominated
2011	48th Grand Bell Awards	Best Visual Effects	Park Jang-jin	Nominated
2011	48th Grand Bell Awards	Best Sound Effects	Jung Hee-gu, Kim Ji-eun	Nominated
2011	32nd Blue Dragon Film Awards	Best Actress	Kim Ha-neul	Won
2011	32nd Blue Dragon Film Awards	Best Screenplay	Choi Min-seok	Nominated
2011	32nd Blue Dragon Film Awards	Best Cinematography	Son Won-ho	Nominated
2011	32nd Blue Dragon Film Awards	Best Lighting	Shin Sang-yeol	Nominated
2011	20th Buil Film Awards	Best Actress	Kim Ha-neul	Nominated
2011	20th Buil Film Awards	Best Supporting Actor	Jo Hee-bong	Nominated
2011	20th Buil Film Awards	Best New Director	Ahn Sang-hoon	Nominated
2011	20th Buil Film Awards	Best Screenplay	Choi Min-seok	Nominated

== Remakes ==
=== China ===
A Chinese remake titled The Witness starring Yang Mi and Luhan and also directed by Ahn Sang-hoon, finished filming in 2015. It was released in China on October 30.

=== Japan ===
A Japanese remake titled Mienai Mokugeki-sha (見えない目撃者; lit. "Sightless Witness"), directed by Junichi Mori, starring Riho Yoshioka and featuring Mahiro Takasugi, Kōji Ōkura, and Kōdai Asaka, was released in Japan on 20 September 2019.

=== India ===
In India the film was remade in two languages; in Tamil language as Netrikann (lit. The Third Eye) starring Nayanthara and directed by Milind Rau and in Hindi with the same name starring Sonam Kapoor in her final film role till date and directed by Shome Makhija. The Tamil version began filming, wrapped up filming in 2020 and was released on Disney+ Hotstar on 13 August 2021. The Hindi version began filming on 28 December 2020, wrapped up filming on 13 February 2021 and was released on 7 July 2023 on JioCinema.
