= Aval Varuvala =

1998 film directed by Raj Kapoor

- Poster
- Directed by: Raj Kapoor
- Screenplay by: Raj Kapoor
- Story by: Srinivaasa Chakravarthy
- Based on: Pelli (Telugu)
- Produced by: Venkata Apparao C. H. B. B. Subbarao
- Starring: Ajith Kumar; Simran
- Cinematography: K. Prasad
- Edited by: B. Lenin; V. T. Vijayan
- Music by: S. A. Rajkumar
- Production company: Sri Vijayamathruka Films
- Release date: 15 May 1998
- Running time: 152 minutes
- Country: India
- Language: Tamil

Aval Varuvala (transl. Will She Come Over?) is a 1998 Indian Tamil-language romantic thriller film directed by Raj Kapoor. It is the Tamil remake of the 1997 Telugu film Pelli. The film stars Ajith Kumar and Simran in the lead roles, while Sujatha, Babloo Prithiveeraj, Goundamani and Senthil play other supporting roles.

Aval Varuvala released on 15 May 1998. It received positive reviews and became a commercial success.

== Plot ==
Jeeva lives with his grandmother Lakshmi in Madurai and says that he would marry the girl he likes at first sight. He goes to Chennai after getting a job as a bank manager there. In a shopping mall, he gets a glimpse of Divya and falls in love with her. He identifies her scooter model and goes on a mission to find her, ending up in a colony surrounded by comedians – Dhandabani, Michael Jackson, Major Ramachandran, Savithri, and James Thomson. The colony people mistakenly think that Jeeva is trying to steal the scooter, and therefore, he lied that he was looking for a house to rent. Then, he agrees to stay in the colony after confirming that Divya and her mother Janaki are living there.

From then on, Jeeva tries to impress Divya. The comedians find out that Jeeva is trying to approach Divya and agree to help him. They ask Janaki's opinion about Divya's marriage. However, Divya refused the offer, saying that she is not interested in getting married. A lonely, sad, pathetic-looking Janaki seemed to hide something. The gang gives a few ideas to persuade Divya, but they all fail. Eventually, tired of foolish ideas, Jeeva tells Janaki that he wants to marry her daughter. Impressed by Jeeva's good manners, Janaki advises Divya to accept him. True to the expectations, Divya reveals that Janaki is actually her mother-in-law.

Knowing that Jeeva loves her, Divya insults him so that he would give up, but he does not. Every time Jeeva does well to Divya, it reminds her of her ex-husband Prithvi's cruelty, and she begins to compare both men. In a dramatic flashback, Prithvi is killed (allegedly) by Divya when he encourages his friends to sexually abuse her. Believing that the bad time is behind them, Janaki and Divya start a new life in a new town as a mother-daughter team. Divya falls in love with Jeeva with the comedians' help. However, Janaki did not allow Divya to tell Jeeva about her past. The entire colony cheers the news, and they arranged an engagement.

Prithvi returns for their betrothal to reclaim his possession. He blackmails Divya to sleep with him the night before her marriage and asks Jeeva to sanction him a loan of Rs. 25 lakhs; otherwise, he will reveal the truth to everyone. Somehow, Jeeva knows the truth and claims to be proud to become Divya's husband. This distracts Prithvi, who then decides to stop the marriage. Wanting to stop Prithvi from doing so, Janaki poisons him and also herself for the sake of a peaceful life for her daughter-in-law.

== Cast ==
- Ajith Kumar as Jeeva
- Simran as Divya, Prithvi's wife
- Sujatha as Janaki, Prithvi’s mother
- Babloo Prithiveeraj as Prithvi
- Goundamani as Dhandapaani
- Senthil as Michael Jackson
- Vennira Aadai Moorthy as Major Ramachandran
- Kovai Sarala as Savithri
- Dhamu as James Thomson
- Jayalalita as Ammukutty
- Kavitha as Roobini
- Idichapuli Selvaraj as Nathan
- Radhabhai as Lakshmi, Jeeva's grandmother
- Rangammal
- Master Manikandan as Oosi Babu
- Japan Kumar (special appearance in "Sikki Mukki")
- Redin Kingsley as Dancer (Uncredited in "Rukku Rukku")

== Production ==
Ajith Kumar shot for this film simultaneously with Kaadhal Mannan (1998). The film saw him and Simran pairing for the first time.

== Soundtrack ==
The soundtrack was composed by S. A. Rajkumar (who reused the songs from the original), with lyrics by Palani Bharathi.

Track listing
No.	Title	Singer(s)	Length
1.	"Sikki Mukki"	S. P. Balasubrahmanyam, K. S. Chithra	4:53
2.	"Idhu Kaadhalin"	P. Jayachandran	4:19
3.	"Kaadhal Enna"	S. P. Balasubrahmanyam	3:53
4.	"Ooh Vandhadhu"	Hariharan	4:32
5.	"Rukku Rukku"	Mano	4:24
6.	"Selaiyile Veedu"	P. Unnikrishnan, K. S. Chithra	4:29
Total length:			26:30

== Release and reception ==
The film released on 15 May 1998. D. S. Ramanujam of The Hindu wrote, "The two familiar trends in Tamil movies are present in this film too – instant love the hero develops towards a girl he spots at a shopping complex and the girl's refusal to accept him because of a past. It is the appreciable manner in which director Raj Kapoor brings out the conflicting emotions of the parties concerned that sustains the audience interest, besides a good dose of comedy led by Goundamani, Senthil, Kovai Sarala, Dhamu and Murthy".

The producers later worked on a film titled Enna Vilai Azhage in 2000 with Prashanth and Amisha Patel. Despite completing most of the shoot, the makers' financial troubles meant that the project did not release.
