= Babloo Prithiveeraj =

Indian actor

- Born: Prithiveeraj; 29 November 1965 (age 60); Bangalore, Karnataka, India
- Occupations: Actor; television presenter
- Years active: 1971–present
- Spouse: Beena (m. 1994–2022)
- Children: 1

Babloo Prithiveeraj (born 29 November 1965) is an Indian actor who works in Tamil, Telugu, Malayalam, Kannada and Hindi films as well as television shows.

== Career ==
Prithveeraj made his acting debut as a child artiste and featured in films, under the stage name of Babloo. He made a comeback as an actor in the 1980s with low budget Malayalam movies before starring in Vaaname Ellai (1992) directed by K. Balachander.

Prithiveeraj is known for his negative roles, in the Telugu film such as Pelli (1997), which earned him the Nandi Award for Best Villain as well as Tamil film, Aval Varuvala (1998).

Despite starting in supporting roles, his on-screen charisma and versatility quickly garnered attention. This marked the beginning of his exploration of diverse characters and genres. As he progressed in his career, Babloo’s ability to effortlessly transition between comedic and dramatic roles became a defining trait.

He then transitioned to negative roles in Tamil films before making his mark on television in the 2000s.

In the 2000s, he played crucial roles in the serials supernatural thriller Marma Desam and Ramany vs Ramany both directed by Naga. These serials gained him a breakthrough, while he also hosted the show Savaal in Jaya TV. He then appeared as transgender goon Ganga in Radhika’s serial Arasi, before continuing to act further in the serial Vani Rani. His role in Vani Rani won him the Best Supporting Actor award at the Sun Kudumbam Viruthugal.

As film offers became less frequent, Prithveeraj spent a year competing as a part of the dance reality show, Jodi No.1 during its second season. During the show, he was involved in an on-air altercation with actor and show judge Silambarasan.

In 2014, he set up a bubble tea shop, Cha Republic, in Besant Nagar, Chennai after being inspired to set up a store following a visit to Malaysia.

The actor made his Bollywood debut in Ranbir Kapoor's blockbuster film Animal (2023).

== Personal life ==
Prithveeraj married Beena in 1994, and they have a son who has autism. Prithveeraj and Beena divorced in 2022.

== Filmography ==
=== Films ===
Year	Title	Role	Language	Notes
1971	Naangu Suvargal		Tamil	Child actor
1974	Dheerga Sumangali		Tamil	Child actor
1975	Naalai Namadhe	Young Vijay	Tamil	Child actor
1979	Naan Vazhavaippen	Ravi's brother	Tamil	Child actor
1985	Bandham	Dancer in song "Hey Aatha"	Tamil	Child actor
1987	Oru Thayin Sabhatham	Madhu	Tamil	
1989	Malayathippennu		Malayalam	
1989	Paandi Nattu Thangam	Chelladurai	Tamil	
1990	Manaivi Oru Manickam		Tamil	
1990	Sandhana Kaatru	Dancer in song "Raavu Neram"	Tamil	Special appearance
1991	Sigaram		Tamil	Guest appearance
1991	Kumbakarai Thangaiah		Tamil	
1991	Azhagan	Kumarasan	Tamil	
1991	Vasavadatta		Malayalam	
1992	Vaaname Ellai	Gautham	Tamil	
1993	Naan Pesa Ninaipathellam		Tamil	Guest appearance
1994	Priyanka		Tamil	Special appearance
1994	Thaatboot Thanjavoor		Tamil	
1994	Veeramani	Gautham	Tamil	
1994	Mani Rathnam	Nadarajan	Tamil	
1994	Pudhiya Mannargal		Tamil	
1994	Thaai Manasu	Periya Marudhu	Tamil	
1995	Chellakannu	Rajavel	Tamil	
1996	Musthaffaa	Lakshmanan	Tamil	
1997	Pelli	Prudhvi	Telugu	
1997	Pelli Pandiri	Prakash	Telugu	
1998	Vettu Onnu Thundu Rendu	Dancer	Tamil	
1998	Aval Varuvala	Prithvi	Tamil	
1998	Circle Inspector		Kannada	
1998	Pellaadi Choopista		Telugu	
1998	Kante Koothurne Kanu		Telugu	
1998	Deergha Sumangali Bhava	Prakash	Telugu	
1999	Samarasimha Reddy	Vasu	Telugu	
1999	Velugu Needalu	Avinash	Telugu	
1999	Rajasthan		Tamil	
1999	Hello...Yama!		Telugu	
1999	Srimathi Vellostha	Rajendra	Telugu	
1999	Panchadara Chilaka	Prithvi	Telugu	
1999	Preyasi Raave	Sriram	Telugu	
1999	Time	Dilip	Tamil	
2000	Sudhandhiram	Charlie	Tamil	
2000	Sammakka Sarakka		Telugu	
2000	Madhuri		Telugu	
2000	Nagulamma		Telugu	
2000	Nagalingam	Raja	Tamil	
2000	Goppinti Alludu	Paramahamsa	Telugu	
2000	Manasunna Maaraju	Pradeep	Telugu	
2000	Vyjayanti		Telugu	
2000	Bhavani		Telugu	
2000	Devullu	Prashanth	Telugu	
2000	Bachi	Bachi	Telugu	
2000	Sanchalanam		Telugu	
2001	Nageswari	Narayanan	Tamil	
2001	Pandanti Samsaram	Narendra	Telugu	
2001	Naa Manasistha Raa		Telugu	
2001	Nuvvu Naaku Nachav	Mohan	Telugu	
2002	Lagna Patrika	Subhash	Telugu	
2002	Santosham	Shriram	Telugu	
2002	Chennakesava Reddy	Chennakesava Reddy's brother-in-law	Telugu	
2003	Naaga		Telugu	
2003	Annai Kaligambal / Shri Kalikamba		Tamil; Kannada	Special appearance
2003	Palnati Brahmanayudu		Telugu	
2003	Thayumanavan	Kanna	Tamil	
2003	Vani Mahal		Tamil	
2004	Love Today		Telugu	
2004	Swetha Naagu	Shapeshifting snake dancer	Telugu; Kannada	Guest appearance
2004	Bhagawan		Kannada	
2005	Keelu Gurram	Sadhu	Telugu	
2005	Gowtam SSC	Kondal Rao	Telugu	
2006	Boys and Girls	Kumar	Tamil	
2006	Seethakoka Chiluka		Telugu	
2006	Chinnodu	Ranga	Telugu	
2007	Best Friends	Prithvi	Malayalam	
2008	Vaaranam Aayiram	Asad	Tamil	
2011	Payanam / Gaganam	Chandrakanth	Tamil; Telugu	
2014	Chandamama Kathalu	DK	Telugu	
2014	Kolagala		Kannada	
2015	Lailaa O Lailaa	Kuppuswamy	Malayalam	
2015	Columbus	Ashwin's father	Telugu	
2017	Ticket	Local Don	Tamil	
2017	Patel S. I. R.	Monti	Telugu	
2018	Parichayam		Telugu	
2018	Nannu Dochukunduvate	David	Telugu	
2019	Neerthirai	Yoganand	Tamil	
2019	NTR: Mahanayakudu	Jaipal Reddy	Telugu	
2019	Kathanam	Former Minister	Telugu	
2019	Marshal	G. M. Ravindar Reddy	Telugu	
2022	Balamevvadu	Phani Bhushan	Telugu	
2022	Urvasivo Rakshasivo	Sindhuja's father	Telugu	
2023	Skanda	Pradeep Malhotra	Telugu	
2023	Maa Oori Polimera 2		Telugu	
2023	Animal	Asrar Haque	Hindi	
2025	Sankranthiki Vasthunam	Pankaj Pandey	Telugu	
2025	Thandel	Koracha Somayya	Telugu	
2025	Laila	Shankar	Telugu	
2025	Jaat	C. H. Sunil Kumar	Hindi	
2025	Arjun Son Of Vyjayanthi	Shivaji	Telugu	
2025	Ace	Raja Durai	Tamil	
2025	Oh Bhama Ayyo Rama	Surya	Telugu	
2025	Krishna Leela		Telugu	
2025	Eesha	Dr. Aadidev	Telugu	
2026	Nilakanta		Telugu	
2026	Commando Vin Love Story		Tamil	
2026	Idhayam Murali	Minister Parandhaman's henchmen	Tamil	

=== Television ===
Year	Title	Role	Network	Language	Notes
1996–1997	Marmadesam	Prasad	Sun TV	Tamil	
1997	Premi		Sun TV	Tamil	
1998	Aalu Magalu		ETV	Telugu	
1998	Manasa Kavvinchake	Bhoopathi	ETV	Telugu	
1998	Nandini		Sun TV	Tamil	
1998–1999	Ramany vs Ramany	Ramany	Sun TV	Tamil	
2005–2006	Raja Rajeshwari	Rajan	Sun TV	Tamil	
2007–2008	Arasi	Ganga	Sun TV	Tamil	
2008	Kausalya		STAR Vijay	Tamil	
2008	Alaipayuthey	Karunakaran	Jaya TV	Tamil	
2008–2009	Gokulathil Seethai	Gokul	Kalaignar TV	Tamil	
2008–2009	Jodi No.1	Contestant	Vijay TV	Tamil	Second season
2010	Rani Yaaru Raja Yaaru	Contestant	Sun TV	Tamil	
2012	Savaal	Host	Jaya TV	Tamil	
2013–2018	Vani Rani	Swaminathan	Sun TV	Tamil	
2020–2023	Kannana Kanne	Gautam Krishnan	Sun TV	Tamil	
2021	Anbe Vaa	Gautam Krishnan	Sun TV	Tamil	Cameo Appearance
2021	Intinti Gruhalakshmi	Rohit	Star Maa	Telugu	Cameo Appearance
2023	Ardhangi	Balamani	Gemini TV	Telugu	Cameo Appearance
2023	Dayaa	Penmatsa Parshurama Raju	Disney+ Hotstar	Telugu	
2023	Super Kudumbam	Gautham	Sun TV	Tamil	
2024	Naanga Ready Neenga Ready Ah	Judge	Sun TV	Tamil	
2025	Touch Me Not		JioHotstar	Telugu	
2025	Ayali	Vikram	Zee Tamil	Tamil	Cameo Appearance

== Awards ==
- Nandi Award for Best Villain – Pelli (1997)
- Sun Kudumbam Viruthugal (Best Supporting Male Actor) – Vani Rani (2014)
