= Prem (film) =

- Directed by: Satish Kaushik
- Written by: Javed Akhtar
- Produced by: Boney Kapoor
- Starring: Sanjay Kapoor; Tabu
- Cinematography: Baba Azmi; Chota K. Naidu
- Edited by: Waman Bhonsle; Gurudutt Shirali
- Music by: Laxmikant–Pyarelal
- Production company: Narsimha Enterprises
- Release date: 5 May 1995
- Running time: 167 minutes
- Country: India
- Language: Hindi

Prem (transl. Love) is a 1995 Indian Hindi-language romantic drama film directed by Satish Kaushik. It stars Sanjay Kapoor and Tabu in dual roles, and deals with the concept of reincarnation. Shekhar Kapoor was initially attached to direct the film before Kaushik was contracted. The film was a box office failure.

== Plot ==
Sanjay Varma is an eligible young man who has been having hallucinations of a past life as Shantanu. He travels to a small community, meets Sonya Jaitley, and recognizes her as the girl named Lachi in his hallucinations. Convinced that they were lovers from a past life, he attempts in vain to impress and force this upon Sonia.

== Cast ==
- Sanjay Kapoor as Shantanu / Sanjay 'Sanju' Verma
- Tabu as Lachi / Sonya Jaitley
- Aruna Irani as Panna
- Amrish Puri as Vanraja
- Deepak Tijori as Vikram Minocha
- Saeed Jaffrey as R. K. Jaitley, Sonya's father
- Dalip Tahil as Ratan Minocha
- Akash Khurana as S.P. Verma, Sanju's father
- Beena Banerjee as Sumitra Verma, Sanju's mother
- Sunita Dhingra as Rumila Gupta aka Bubly, Sanju's friend
- Navneet Nishan as Vanrani
- Govind Namdev as Chacha Sher Ali
- Raju Kher as Mr.Wilson, British Commanding Officer
- Bob Christo as British Senior Officer
- Chandrakant Gokhale as Old Bangharu Baba
- Yusuf Khurram as tribal Damaru
- Sudhir

== Production ==
Mani Ratnam and Shekhar Kapur both turned down the chance to direct the film before Satish Kaushik was finalised. This film marked the debut of Sanjay Kapoor. This was Tabu's first Hindi film that she signed as a lead actress although Pehla Pehla Pyar (1994) released first. The film apparently took eight years to complete, owing to several delays, and had been in production since 1989. According to some media sources and reports, speculations erupted over possibilities of a deep chemistry between lead actors Sanjay and Tabu that was largely gossiped in film circles to have been unfolded during the film shooting. In an interview, actress Tabu revealed that it was Shekhar Kapur who convinced her to sign up for Prem and she said it was one of the worse decisions that she took in her life as she regretted taking up a role in the film.

== Songs ==
1. "Maine Jee Liya Mar Liya Prem Kar Liya" - Nalin Dave, Alka Yagnik
2. "Ye Dharti Ye Ambar Jab Se" (Duet) - Alka Yagnik, Nalin Dave
3. "Saat Janam Saat Vachan Saat Samandar" - Nalin Dave
4. "Ye Dharti Ye Ambar Jab Se" (Male) - Nalin Dave
5. "Ye Dharti Ye Ambar Jab Se" (Female) - Alka Yagnik
6. "Ho Meree Chudiya Bajee Chhan Chhan" - Alka Yagnik, Nalin Dave
7. "Tum Khubsurat Ho Tum Haseen Ho" - Nalin Dave
8. "Do Teri Akhiya Do Meri Akhiya" - Alka Yagnik, Nalin Dave
9. "Ek Baat Hui Kal Rat Hui" - Nalin Dave, Alka Yagnik
10. "Hai Meri Ankhiyo Ne Sapna Dekha Re" - Alka Yagnik
11. "Hai Meri Ankhiyo Ne Sapna Dekha Re" (2) - Alka Yagnik
