= Balamevvadu =

India 2022 film

- Official poster
- Directed by: Satya Rachakonda
- Starring: Dhruvan Katakam; Nia Tripathi
- Music by: Mani Sharma
- Release date: 1 October 2022
- Country: India
- Language: Telugu

Balamevvadu is a 2022 Indian Telugu-language romantic thriller directed by Satya Rachakonda and starring Dhruvan Katakam and Nia Tripathi.

== Cast ==
- Dhruvan Katakam as Satyanarayana
- Nia Tripathi as Parnika
- Babloo Prithviraj as Phani Bhushan
- Suhasini Maniratnam as Dr. Yashoda
- Nassar as Dr. James
- Vivek Trivedi
- Jabardasth Apparao
- Idream Anjali
- Mani Mahesh
- Sravan Bharath as Thomas Jefferson

== Soundtrack ==
The songs were composed by Mani Sharma.

== Reception ==
A critic from The Times of India wrote that "Overall, Balamevvadu touches a chord by highlighting the plight of commoners when they believe in the medical system. The unique way of presenting this fact makes it a decent watch". A critic from Cinema Express wrote that "Balamevvadu is a decent love story which explores love in the first half and exposes the medical mafia in the second half". A critic from Sakshi rated the film 2 1/2 out of five stars.
