= Koi Mere Dil Se Poochhe =

- Movie Poster
- Directed by: Vinay Shukla
- Written by: Vinay Shukla
- Based on: Pelli by Kodi Ramakrishna
- Produced by: Boney Kapoor
- Starring: Aftab Shivdasani; Esha Deol; Sanjay Kapoor; Jaspal Bhatti
- Cinematography: Rajan Kothari
- Edited by: Shirish Kunder
- Music by: Rajesh Roshan
- Production company: S. K. Films
- Distributed by: Eros International
- Release date: 11 January 2002
- Country: India
- Language: Hindi

Koi Mere Dil Se Poochhe (translation: Someone ask my heart) is a 2002 Indian Hindi-language romance thriller film directed by Vinay Shukla, starring Aftab Shivdasani, Esha Deol, Sanjay Kapoor, and Jaya Bachchan. Anupam Kher, Juliet Albuquerque, Jaspal Bhatti and Rajpal Yadav play supporting roles. The film is a remake of the 1997 Telugu film Pelli.

== Synopsis ==
Designer Aman Puri is the only son of the Puri family. His dad wants him to get married, but Aman insists he will not marry unless he meets the girl of his dreams. While trying to design his final project, he sees Esha Singh, a fellow student at his college. Aman does his best to strike a friendship with Esha, but she adamantly refuses him. His father, unable to see Aman hurt, decides to speak with Esha's mother, Mansi Devi. Mansi Devi assures Aman's father that she has no objections to Aman's intentions toward Esha. She then speaks to Esha, telling her there is nothing wrong with returning Aman's friendship.

Aman and Esha fall in love and are planning to get married. At Aman and Esha's engagement ceremony, Dushyant shows up, saying that he is Mansi Devi's son. Esha, upon seeing Dushyant, becomes extremely frightened. It turns out that Dushyant is indeed Mansi Devi's son, and Esha is his wife. On their honeymoon, Dushyant attempted to get her gangraped and film the scene. Esha escaped, believing that Dushyant had died. She returned to Mansi Devi and told her the truth about her son. Mansi Devi and Esha moved to another town, pretending to be mother and daughter. Now, Dushyant vows to destroy Esha's life. Aman finds out the truth and vows that nothing can stop him from marrying Esha.

On Esha's marriage day, Mansi Devi goes to Dushyant with Kheer (rice pudding), which she has especially made for him. Dushyant, not trusting her, asks her to eat it first. She does, and then he eats it as well. It turns out that the pudding was poisoned. Dushyant dies a most horrific and painful death due to the high levels of concentration of the poisons that he had inadvertently ingested. After witnessing Aman and Esha's wedding ceremony, Mansi Devi dies. Hence, she reunites two lost souls and saves their never-ending love.

== Cast ==
- Jaya Bachchan as Mansi Devi
- Sanjay Kapoor as Dushyant, Eisha's 1st husband.
- Aftab Shivdasani as Aman Puri, Eisha's 2nd husband.
- Esha Deol as Eisha Dushyant Singh / Eisha Aman Puri
- Juliet Alburque as Anna
- Jaspal Bhatti as Naraaz Shankar
- Anupam Kher as Mr. Puri, Aman's father.
- Rajpal Yadav as Raj Naidu

== Soundtrack ==
Koi Mere Dil Se Poochhe

Studio album by Rajesh Roshan
- Released: 2001
- Genre: Feature film soundtrack
- Label: Tips
- Producer: Rajesh Roshan

Rajesh Roshan chronology
| Moksha: Salvation (2001) | Koi Mere Dil Se Poochhe (2001) | Aap Mujhe Achche Lagne Lage (2002) |

The soundtrack of the film was composed by Rajesh Roshan.

| Track: | Song: | Singer(s): | Duration: | Lyric |
|---|---|---|---|---|
| 1 | "Koi Mere Dil Se Poochhe" | Udit Narayan | 00:37 | Ibrahim Ashk |
| 2 | "Aawara Main Badal" | Sonu Nigam & Hema Sardesai | 06:35 | Dev Kohli |
| 3 | "Deewana Tera Hai" | Udit Narayan | 06:11 | Ibrahim Ashk |
| 4 | "Jab Tu Muskurati Hai" | Udit Narayan & Pamela Jain | 07:48 | Ibrahim Ashk |
| 5 | "Mat Ho Udhas" | Shaan & Pamela Jain | 05:02 | Suryabhanu Gupt |
| 6 | "Lapak Jhapak" | Kamaal Khan | 07:16 | |
| 7 | "Hanse Tim Tim" | Pamela Jain & Chorus | 06:09 | Suryabhanu Gupt |
| 8 | "Tera Bhala Kare Bhagwan" | Sonu Nigam | 06:26 | Suryabhanu Gupt |
| 9 | "Kahti Hai Mangani Ki Angoothi" | Preeti Uttam | 01:08 | |

== Reception ==
=== Critical response ===
Ziya Us Salam of The Hindu gave a positive review, writing, "'Koi Mere...' comes with a reasonably tight script, good story-telling and a dash of suspense. With Rajesh Roshan's music being par for the course, it is not a bad bargain at all."

Conversely, Savera R Someshwar of Rediff.com wrote, "All in all, Koi Mere Dil Se Pooche is disappointing fare from Shukla, whose debut film Godmother held much promise."

=== Box office ===
The film earned ₹ 2.7 crore at the box office.

== Awards and nominations ==
=== Won ===
==== Bollywood Movie Awards ====
- Bollywood Movie Award - Best Female Debut: Esha Deol

==== Filmfare Awards ====
- Filmfare Award for Best Female Debut - Esha Deol

==== IIFA Awards ====
- Star Debut of the Year - Female - Esha Deol

==== Star Screen Awards ====
- Screen Award for Most Promising Newcomer – Female - Esha Deol

Sansui Viewer's Choice Awards

- Sansui Viewer's Choice Awards – Most Promising Debut Actress - Esha Deol

=== Nominated ===
==== Zee Cine Awards ====
- Best Female Debut – Esha Deol
