= Arjun Kapoor =

Indian actor (born 1985)

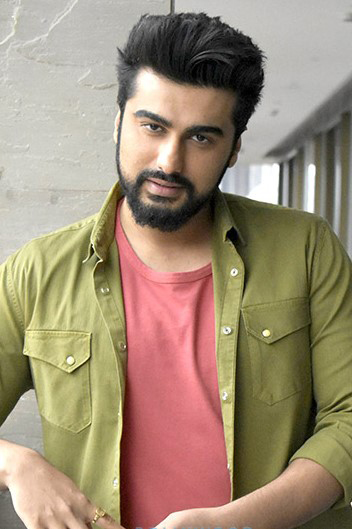
- Kapoor in 2017
- Born: 26 June 1985 (age 41); Mumbai, Maharashtra, India
- Occupation: Actor
- Years active: 2012–present
- Parents: Boney Kapoor (father); Mona Shourie (mother)
- Family: Surinder Kapoor family

Arjun Kapoor (born 26 June 1985) is an Indian actor who worked in Hindi cinema. Born to the Surinder Kapoor family, he is the son of film producers Boney Kapoor and Mona Shourie. Kapoor was featured in Forbes India's Celebrity 100 list from 2014 to 2017 and in 2019.

Kapoor started his career working as an assistant director and producer on Nikhil Advani's productions and two of his father's productions. He later made his acting debut under Yash Raj Films romantic drama Ishaqzaade (2012) a commercial success earning him Filmfare Award for Best Male Debut nomination and winning the Zee Cine Award for Best Male Debut. Kapoor achieved further successes in the 2014 films, the crime action Gunday, the romantic comedy 2 States, the comedy drama Ki & Ka (2016) and received praise for the black comedy Sandeep Aur Pinky Faraar (2021).This success was followed by a series of commercially unsuccessful films and a career decline, with the exception of Half Girlfriend (2017) and Singham Again (2024). The poorly received Mere Husband Ki Biwi (2025) was followed by a hiatus from acting.

In addition to acting, Kapoor hosted several award ceremonies. He also ventured into television with hosting the seventh season of Indian reality TV series Fear Factor: Khatron Ke Khiladi 7.

== Early life and family ==
Arjun Kapoor was born on 26 June 1985 in Mumbai, Maharashtra, to film producer Boney Kapoor and the entrepreneur Mona Shourie Kapoor. Kapoor is of Punjabi ancestry from both sides. He is the grandson of filmmaker Surinder Kapoor. He is the nephew of actors Anil Kapoor, Sanjay Kapoor and producer Sandeep Marwah, and the first-cousin of former actress Sonam Kapoor, actors Mohit Marwah, Harshvardhan Kapoor and producer Rhea Kapoor. He has a younger sister, Anshula Kapoor. Actress Sridevi was his stepmother, and he also has two half-sisters, Khushi Kapoor and Janhvi Kapoor.

He was 11 when his father separated from his mother. When asked in an interview about his father's second marriage, Kapoor said: "When we were kids, it was difficult. But what can you do? How long will you complain? You have to accept what is, take it on your chin, and move on." He added, "We don't really meet and spend time together so it doesn't really exist". His mother died in 2012. However, after Sridevi died in 2018, his relationship with his half-sisters Khushi and Jahnvi improved. Kapoor also opened up on the bullying he faced post Boney's marriage with Sridevi.

Kapoor was educated at the Arya Vidya Mandir school in Mumbai, which he attended until his 11th grade. After failing his eleventh grade examinations, he quit his studies and did not complete grade 12. In his teens and early twenties, Kapoor developed obesity and approximately weighed 140 kg; he later said that due to his condition, he used to be "sloppy, grumpy" and "under-confident".

== Career ==
=== 2003–2017: Early work, breakthrough and fluctuations ===
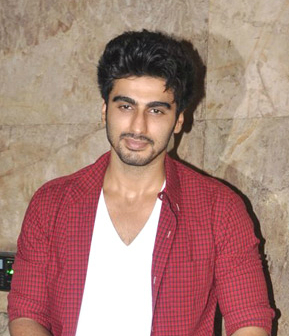
Kapoor at the screening of D-Day in 2013

Kapoor's first job in the film industry was as an assistant director on Nikhil Advani's Kal Ho Naa Ho in 2003. He also assisted Advani on his next directorial, Salaam-e-Ishq: A Tribute to Love (2007), and worked as an associate producer on two of his father's productions—No Entry (2005) and Wanted (2009). Kapoor was then signed on for a three-film contract with Yash Raj Films, a leading production company in India.

In 2011, it was announced that Kapoor would debut with a film named Virus Diwan, produced under Yash Raj Films, which was shelved after some time. Later, he signed on to debut with the company's romantic drama Ishaqzaade (2012) opposite Parineeti Chopra, which tells the love story between a son and daughter of a Hindu and Muslim political family, respectively. While filming a running sequence for the feature in Barabanki, Kapoor suffered a spasm in his hamstring muscle, though he finished the scene after resting for five minutes. The film grossed over ₹46 crore (US$4.8 million) at the domestic box office and was termed a super hit by Box Office India. His performance earned him the Zee Cine Award for Best Male Debut and nominations for the Filmfare Award for Best Male Debut and the IIFA Award for Star Debut of the Year (male). Taran Adarsh noted, "Arjun makes a fantastic debut. He comes across as fiery and rustic and at the same time self-assured and assertive in this reckless and intrepid character."

Yash Raj Films' next project to star Kapoor was the action thriller Aurangzeb (2013), whose title matches the name of a Mughal emperor of the same name. Marking the directorial debut of Atul Sabharwal, it co-starred Prithviraj Sukumaran, Jackie Shroff, Rishi Kapoor and Amrita Singh; he portrayed two estranged twin brothers, Ajay and Vishal, who end up in each other's places as part of a huge conspiracy to overthrow their biological father's empire. Critic Rachna Saltz from The New York Times said of Kapoor that he is a "star of an earlier generation" and is "well-cast and matched". However, the film underperformed at the box office.

For his first film in 2014, Kapoor teamed with Yash Raj Films for the third consecutive time on Gunday, a crime action film also starring Ranveer Singh, Priyanka Chopra, and Irrfan Khan. Directed by Ali Abbas Zafar, it saw him and Singh portray two bandits with bold attitude, in love with a dancer (Chopra). He described his character as "temperamental" who acts as a "moment's heat." Film analyst Anupama Chopra mentioned the film as an "unabashed love letter to the 1970s." Gunday proved to be a commercial success and accumulated over ₹1.2 billion (US$12 million) worldwide.

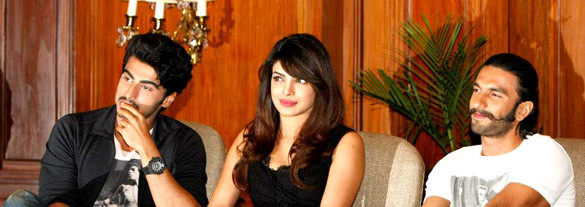
Kapoor with co-stars Ranveer Singh and Priyanka Chopra at the press conference of Gunday in 2014

As his three-film deal with Yash Raj Films concluded, Kapoor next collaborated with the producers Sajid Nadiadwala and Karan Johar to star opposite Alia Bhatt in a film adaptation of Chetan Bhagat's popular novel 2 States, released with the same title. He played Krish Malhotra, an IIM Ahmedabad MBA student wanting to become a writer. Saurabh Dwivedi stated that Kapoor "shows his pain through body language but falls short in some scenes opposite his co-actor Ronit Roy." The project was well appreciated, garnering critical acclaim, and earned more than ₹1.75 billion (US$18 million) worldwide to emerge as his biggest commercial success so far. He received a nomination for the IIFA Award for Best Actor. His last release of 2014 was Homi Adajania's adventurous satire Finding Fanny, which co-starred Deepika Padukone, Naseeruddin Shah, Dimple Kapadia, and Pankaj Kapur and the movie follows the lives of five dysfunctional people in search of a titular woman.

In 2015, Kapoor featured in his father's second younger brother Sanjay's first production Tevar, a remake of the Telugu film Okkadu (2003), in which he co-starred alongside Sonakshi Sinha and Manoj Bajpayee as a Kabaddi player. He was director Amit Sharma's only choice to play the role. Upon release, the film was poorly received both critically and commercially.

In 2016, Kapoor served as the host for the seventh season of Colors TV's reality stunts-performing series Fear Factor: Khatron Ke Khiladi. In the same year, he starred opposite Kareena Kapoor Khan in R. Balki's satirical comedy-drama Ki & Ka, based on the content of gender stereotypes. Kapoor portrayed the male lead Kabir Bansal, a stay-at-home husband. Writing for India Today, Ananya Bhattacharya gave the film a negative review and wrote that Kapoor "looks like a mouthing sharp". Nonetheless, the film received mixed reviews and emerged as a commercial success grossing ₹1.03 billion.

The Mohit Suri-directed teen romantic drama Half Girlfriend was Kapoor's first film appearance of 2017, which served as a retelling of Bhagat's novel of the same name. He was cast in the role of Madhav Jha, a basketball champion who hardly speaks English and ends up getting attracted towards a college girl (played by Shraddha Kapoor) when he joins a college. In an interview, Kapoor admitted that he signed the film despite not reading the novel. The film received mixed-to-negative reviews and emerged as a below average grosser at the box office. Later that year, Kapoor played twin brothers for the second time in Mubarakan, a comedy directed by Anees Bazmee, in which he starred alongside his uncle Anil Kapoor. The film also featured Ileana D'Cruz and Athiya Shetty as the love interests of his characters. In her review, Saibal Chatterjee wrote that Kapoor "demonstrates a comic flair that is crying out for a better film".

=== 2018–2025: Professional decline and hiatus ===
2018 to 2023 proved to be disappointing years in Kapoor's career, as these films he starred in were major commercial failures, except his OTT releases.

In 2018, Kapoor starred in a spin-off to the romantic comedy Namastey London (2007), named Namaste England, helmed by Vipul Amrutlal Shah. He played a man who falls in love with an aspiring jewelry designer played by Parineeti Chopra, reuniting with the actress after Ishaqzaade. Saibal Chatterjee of NDTV concluded his scathing review of the film with a note stating, "Seriously, one more film of this quality and the careers of Parineeti Chopra and Arjun Kapoor could be in grave jeopardy. Hopefully, these two young actors know better." In 2019, his first release, the crime drama India's Most Wanted directed by Raj Kumar Gupta, he essayed the role of an agent who is given a secret mission of tracking a terrorist. His second screen appearance occurred in Ashutosh Gowarikar's big-budget period drama Panipat alongside Sanjay Dutt and Kriti Sanon. Based on the 3rd Panipat battle, it featured him as Maratha commander-in-chief Sadashivrao Bhau and depicted how Bhau fought the battle against the Afghan warrior Ahmed Shah Abdali. In 2021, his first appearance in the black comedy-drama Sandeep Aur Pinky Faraar, which marked his third collaboration with Parineeti Chopra, which was released on 19 March. His second appearance in Kaashvie Nair's Sardar Ka Grandson in which he was paired opposite Rakul Preet Singh. His third appearance in the horror comedy film Bhoot Police co-starring Saif Ali Khan, Jacqueline Fernandez and Yami Gautam. Both of his movies were released on 18 May and 10 September on Netflix and Disney+ Hotstar. In 2022, his only release in Mohit Suri's Ek Villain Returns with John Abraham, Disha Patani and Tara Sutaria, it was released on 29 July. In 2023, his first appearance in Aasmaan Bharadwaj's directorial debut Kuttey alongside Tabu, Radhika Madan and Naseeruddin Shah was released on 13 January. His second appearance in The Lady Killer alongside Bhumi Pednekar was released on 3 November. It was panned by critics and emerged as one of the biggest box office bombs in Indian cinema.

Following several critical and commercial failures, Kapoor played a terrorist in Rohit Shetty's 2024 film Singham Again and marked his penultimate release before hiatus. Udita Jhunjhunwala found him to be a "solid fit as the villain" in this heavy-duty cast. Singham Again had modest box-office returns on its high production budget. Arjun, who has risen to fame with roles in films like Singham Returns, made this day even more memorable by honoring his father’s legacy. The film eventually emerged as the seventh highest-grossing Indian film of the year.

In 2025, Kapoor starred in the rom-com Mere Husband Ki Biwi with Rakul Preet Singh and Bhumi Pednekar, marking his third collaboration with the latter, post The Lady Killer. It became another box-office bomb for Kapoor and marked his final release before hiatus.

== Criticism and public image ==
Kapoor has faced significant online criticism and trolling, primarily targeting his physical appearance, acting abilities, and nepotism as the son of film producer Boney Kapoor. He has been subjected to body-shaming and memes, particularly during periods when he gained weight, as well as after certain film performances that received mixed or negative reviews. Kapoor has spoken openly about the impact of such trolling on his mental health and has addressed the criticism as part of being a public figure in the age of social media. In response, he has focused on fitness transformations and used humour to address the trolls, earning appreciation from some quarters for his resilience and candidness.

== Personal life ==
Kapoor was in a relationship with Arpita Khan, Salman Khan's sister, before he became an actor. He began a relationship with Sonakshi Sinha, his co-star in Tevar, in 2014, but they broke up a year later. Kapoor was in a relationship with Malaika Arora, from 2016 to 2024.

Kapoor has said that he does not follow any particular religion.

== Other work ==
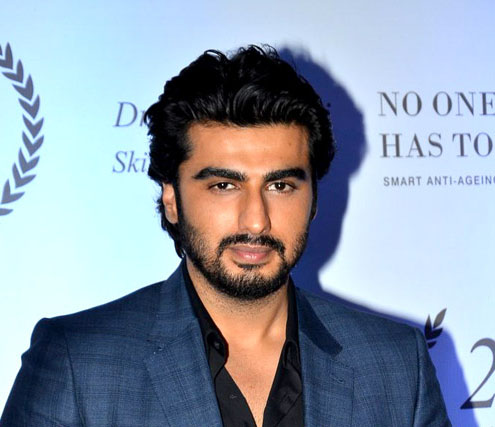
Kapoor at an event in 2015

Kapoor is a keen football fan and an avid supporter of Chelsea F.C. while also being the club's brand ambassador for India. Kapoor is an endorser for various brands and products, and was the co-owner of the ISL team FC Pune City before it was dissolved in 2019 due to financial and technical difficulties. Philips also roped him as their brand ambassador. He was also a brand ambassador for Flying Machine and Royal Stag along with Ranveer Singh as well as Hero Cycles. As of 2017, he also endorses Smith & Jones ketchup, condiments and sauces, and Admiral England Sportswear & Sportshoes.

Kapoor co-hosted the IIFA Awards ceremony in 2015 with Singh. He has also hosted the seventh season of the reality TV series Fear Factor: Khatron Ke Khiladi 7.

== Filmography ==
=== Films ===
Year	Title	Role	Notes	Ref.
2003	Kal Ho Naa Ho	—	Assistant director	
2005	No Entry	—	Associate producer	
2007	Salaam-e-Ishq	—	Assistant director	
2009	Wanted	—	Associate producer	
2012	Ishaqzaade	Parma Chauhan	First film role	
2013	Aurangzeb	Vishal Singh / Ajay Singh		
2014	Gunday	Bala Bhattacharya		
2014	2 States	Krish Malhotra		
2014	Finding Fanny	Savio Da Gama	English film	
2015	Tevar	Ghanshyam Shukla		
2015	All India Bakchod Knockout	Himself	Roastee	
2016	Ki & Ka	Kabir Bansal		
2017	Half Girlfriend	Madhav Jha		
2017	Mubarakan	Karan Singh Bajwa Sood / Charan Singh Bajwa		
2018	Bhavesh Joshi	Himself	Special appearance in the song "Chavanprash"	
2018	Namaste England	Param Randhawa		
2018	Zero	Himself	Cameo appearance	
2019	India's Most Wanted	Prabhat Kumar		
2019	Panipat	Sadashivrao Bhau		
2021	Sandeep Aur Pinky Faraar	Satinder "Pinky" Dahiya		
2021	Sardar Ka Grandson	Amreek Singh		
2021	Bhoot Police	Chiraunji Vaidya		
2022	Ek Villain Returns	Gautam Mehra		
2023	Kuttey	Gopal Tiwari		
2023	The Lady Killer	Rajendar Joshi		
2024	Singham Again	Zubair Hafeez aka Danger Lanka		
2025	Mere Husband Ki Biwi	Ankur Chaddha		

=== Television ===
Year	Title	Role	Notes	Ref.
2015	16th IIFA Awards	Host		
2016	Fear Factor: Khatron Ke Khiladi 7	Host		
2017	Taarak Mehta Ka Ooltah Chashmah	Himself	Guest appearance	
2021	Dance Plus 6	Himself	Guest appearance	
2020–present	Fabulous Lives of Bollywood Wives	Himself	Guest appearance	
2023	Cinema Marte Dum Tak	Himself	Docu-series	

=== Music video appearances ===
Year	Title	Singer(s)	Ref.
2021	"Dil Hai Deewana"	Darshan Raval, Zara Khan	

== Awards and nominations ==
Year	Award	Category	Film	Result	Ref.
2012	Bhaskar Bollywood Awards	Fresh Entry of the Year	Ishaqzaade	Nominated	
2012	People's Choice Awards India	Favorite Debut Actor – Male	Ishaqzaade	Nominated	
2012	BIG Star Entertainment Awards	Most Entertaining Debut Actor – Male	Ishaqzaade	Won	
2013	Filmfare Awards	Best Male Debut	Ishaqzaade	Nominated	
2013	ETC Bollywood Business Awards	Most Profitable Debut – Male	Ishaqzaade	Nominated	
2013	Screen Awards	Most Promising Newcomer – Male	Ishaqzaade	Nominated	
2013	Zee Cine Awards	Best Male Debut	Ishaqzaade	Won	
2013	Stardust Awards	Superstar of Tomorrow – Male	Ishaqzaade	Won	
2013	Renault Star Guild Awards	Best Male Debut	Ishaqzaade	Nominated	
2013	Times of India Film Awards	Best Debut – Male	Ishaqzaade	Nominated	
2013	International Indian Film Academy Awards	Star Debut of the Year – Male	Ishaqzaade	Nominated	
2014	International Indian Film Academy Awards	Best Actor	2 States	Nominated	
2014	Stardust Awards	Best Actor in a Comedy or Romance	2 States	Nominated	
2014	BIG Star Entertainment Awards	Most Entertaining Actor in a Romantic Film – Male	2 States	Nominated	
2014	BIG Star Entertainment Awards	Most Entertaining Actor in an Action Film – Male	Gunday	Nominated	
2014	Stardust Awards	Best Actor in a Thriller or Action	Gunday	Nominated	
2023	Pinkvilla Screen and Style Icons Awards	Super Stylish Mould-Breaker (Male)	—N/a	Won	
2023	Bollywood Hungama Style Icons	Most Stylish Actor Male – People's Choice	—N/a	Nominated	
2023	Bollywood Hungama Style Icons	Most Stylish Mould Breaking Star (Male)	—N/a	Won	
