= Pelli (film) =

1997 Telugu film by Kodi Ramakrishna

- Directed by: Kodi Ramakrishna
- Story by: Srinivasa Chakravarthy
- Produced by: N. Ramalingeswara Rao
- Dialogues by: G. Satyamurthy
- Starring: Vadde Naveen; Maheswari
- Cinematography: Kodi Lakshman (as Kodi Lakshmana Rao)
- Edited by: Suresh Tata
- Music by: S. A. Rajkumar
- Production company: Sree Ramprasad Art Pictures
- Release date: 1 August 1997
- Country: India
- Language: Telugu

Pelli (transl. Marriage) is a 1997 Indian Telugu-language drama film directed by Kodi Ramakrishna, starring Vadde Naveen, Maheswari, and Prithvi. The film marked Prithvi's debut as an adult in Telugu cinema. The story was written by Srinivasa Chakravarthy, and the dialogues were penned by G. Satyamurthy. The music was composed by S. A. Rajkumar, marking his first Telugu film as a solo composer.

The film was a commercial success and received critical acclaim, winning a Filmfare Award and two Nandi Awards. Pelli was later remade in Kannada as Maduve (1997), in Tamil as Aval Varuvala (1998), and in Hindi as Koi Mere Dil Se Poochhe (2002).

== Plot ==
Naveen, a manager in UTI Bank, sees Maheswari, a sales girl in a shopping mall, and promptly falls in love and wants to marry her. Soon he goes in search of her and discovers she lives in a colony with Janakamma, whom he assumes is her mother. Naveen, with the help of the colony residents, tries to win her love. Janakamma, aware of his intentions, encourages Maheswari to marry him, but Maheswari refuses.

It is then revealed that Janakamma is actually Maheswari's mother-in-law. Janakamma had married her only son, Prudhvi, to Maheswari. After enduring a physically and emotionally abusive marriage, Maheswari fatally wounded Prudhvi, knocking him unconscious. Both Janakamma and Maheswari flee from the scene and start a fresh life as mother and daughter thinking that he is dead. Maheswari falls in love with Naveen and agrees to marry him.

Prudhvi finds them and shows up at the engagement party and blackmails Maheswari to get his ₹10 lakh loan sanctioned by Naveen, or else he would tell everyone the truth that they are still married. Meanwhile, Janakamma is convinced that the only way of stopping her son from ruining Naveen and Maheswari's wedding is to kill him. The wedding and Prudhvi's birthday fall on the same day. Janakamma makes payasam for Prudhvi as she always does on his birthday and puts poison in it. Prudhvi, suspicious of his mother being with him instead of at the wedding, asks her to drink the payasam first to which she obliges. He then drinks it and dies. Janakamma arrives at the wedding in time and dies just after the ceremony.

== Cast ==
- Vadde Naveen as Naveen (Voiced by Srinivasa Murthy)
- Maheswari as Maheswari (Voiced by Shilpa)
- Prithvi as Prudhvi (Voiced by Mano)
- Sujatha as Janakamma, Pruthvi's mother
- Bramhanandam as Nammakala Sambasiva Rao aka Nasa
- Giribabu as Military Major
- Mallikarjuna Rao as Sanyasi
- Jayalalita as Saralamma
- Kovai Sarala as Meena, Nasa's wife
- Ananth Babu as Director
- Y. Vijaya as Nalini, Maheswari's boss

== Production ==
The story of Pelli was written by Srinivasa Chakravarthy, with dialogues by G. Satyamurthy. The film is loosely based on the 1991 American film Sleeping With the Enemy.

The lead actors' voices were dubbed by professional dubbing artists. Vadde Naveen's voice was dubbed by Srinivasa Murthy, Maheswari's by Shilpa, and Prithvi's by Mano (credited as Nagoor Babu).

== Music ==
Pelli

Soundtrack album by S. A. Rajkumar
- Released: 1997
- Length: 25:14
- Producer: S. A. Rajkumar

Music for Pelli was composed by S. A. Rajkumar and lyrics were written by Sirivennela Sitaramasastri. This marked Rajkumar's first Telugu film as a solo composer.

No.	Title	Singer(s)	Length
1.	"Yavvana Veena"	S. P. Balasubrahmanyam	04:33
2.	"Paita Kongu"	S. P. Balasubrahmanyam, K. S. Chithra	04:30
3.	"Kondaa Konaa"	S. P. Balasubrahmanyam, K. S. Chithra	04:54
4.	"Jaabilamma"	S. P. Balasubrahmanyam	03:53
5.	"Rukku Rukku"	Mano	04:23
6.	"Anuraagame"	K. J. Yesudas	04:21

== Reception ==
The film was reviewed by Zamin Ryot. A critic from Andhra Today said that "The movie, a good entertainer until the arrival of Prithvi on the scene takes on a serious turn. The director Kodi Ramakrishna proves an expert in combining humor and sentiment".

== Awards ==
Filmfare Awards

- Best Male Playback Singer – Telugu - Mano - "Rukku Rukku Rukmini"

Nandi Awards

- Best Character Actress - Sujatha
- Best Villain - Prithviraj

== Remakes ==
The film was remade in Kannada as Maduve (1997), in Tamil as Aval Varuvala (1998) with Prithvi reprised his namesake role from the original, and in Hindi as Koi Mere Dil Se Poochhe (2002).
