= Sisak (film) =

- Directed by: Faraz Arif Ansari
- Written by: Faraz Arif Ansari
- Starring: Jitin Gulati; Dhruv Singhal
- Music by: Dhawal Tandon
- Release date: 2017
- Running time: 16 minutes
- Country: India
- Language: Silent

Sisak (2017) is a short film, starring Jitin Gulati and Dhruv Singhal. It was written and directed by Faraz Arif Ansari and is billed as India's first silent queer love story. The trailer was launched by Sonam Kapoor on 30 January on Twitter. It has won 59 international awards at various film festivals.

== Plot ==
Set in Mumbai, the plot follows two young men who regularly take the same local train home. Both are quiet and shy, but dare to come close enough to say something to each other, but just can't bring themselves to open their mouths.

== Making ==
Ansari exhausted all his savings to make this film as it was refused by Indian studios who weren't comfortable dealing with a "taboo subject."

The post-production funding was gathered from a crowdfunding campaign through Wishberry. Ansari raised $6,000 from 109 backers and the shooting was completed in nine months. The shooting was mostly done in guerrilla style on Mumbai's local trains.

== Reception ==
The movie was screened at various film festivals around the world including Cannes, Wicked Queer in Boston, FilmOut San Diego, 2017 KASHISH Mumbai International Queer Film Festival, Mawjoudin Queer Film Festival, Internationale Kurzfilmwoche Regensburg, Outfest Fusion LGBT People of Color Film Festival and the Pune LGBT Festival screening. It has been nominated for the Iris Prize (an international LGBTQ short film prize).

The film was given 3.5/5 by a review on TOI and was praised as "A brave film that expresses dissent against section 377 of the Indian Penal Code". The film was nominated for the Satyajit Ray Award.
