= Stardust Award for Superstar of Tomorrow – Female =

Film award in India

The Stardust Superstar of Tomorrow - Female is an annual recognition granted to female actresses in India. The selected actress is chosen by a distinguished jury as part of the annual Stardust Magazine. The award honours a star who has made an impact with her acting and who represents new talent.

Past award winners and the films for which they won:

Year	Actress	Film
2016	Disha Patani & Saiyami Kher	M.S. Dhoni: The Untold Story & Mirzya
2015	Bhumi Pednekar	Dum Laga Ke Haisha
2014	Alia Bhatt	Highway
2013	Parineeti Chopra	Ishaqzaade
2012	Parineeti Chopra	Ladies VS Ricky Bahl
2011	Sonakshi Sinha	Dabangg
2010	Mugdha Godse	Jail
2009	Asin Thottumkal	Ghajini
2008	Sonam Kapoor	Saawariya
2007	Kangana Ranaut	Gangster
2006	Vidya Balan	Parineeta
2005	Priyanka Chopra	Mujhse Shaadi Karogi
2004	Amrita Rao	Ishq Vishk
2003	Antara Mali	Road & Company

== See also ==
- Stardust Awards
- Bollywood
- Cinema of India
