= Mona Shourie Kapoor =

Indian television and film producer

- Kapoor in 2011
- Born: 3 February 1964; New Delhi, India
- Died: 25 March 2012 (aged 48); Mumbai, Maharashtra, India
- Occupations: Producer, entrepreneur
- Years active: 1993–2012
- Spouse: Boney Kapoor (m. 1983; div. 1996)
- Children: 2, inc. Arjun Kapoor

Mona Shourie Kapoor (3 February 1964 – 25 March 2012) was an Indian television producer, film producer, and entrepreneur. She was the daughter of Sattee Shourie and first wife of Bollywood producer Boney Kapoor and also the mother of actor Arjun Kapoor.

== Early and personal life ==
Shourie was born in New Delhi on 3 February 1964. She was married to Boney Kapoor from 1983 to 1996 and had two children, son Arjun Kapoor and daughter Anshula Kapoor.

== Career ==
Mona Kapoor was the CEO of Future Studios, an indoor shooting studio in Mumbai.

== Death ==
Kapoor died due to multiple organ failure after battling with cancer and hypertension on 25 March 2012 in presence of her children.
