= Dolly Ki Doli =

2015 Indian film by Abhishek Dogra

- Directed by: Abhishek Dogra
- Written by: Umashankar Singh; Abhishek Dogra
- Produced by: Arbaaz Khan; Malaika Arora Khan
- Starring: Sonam Kapoor; Pulkit Samrat; Rajkummar Rao; Varun Sharma
- Cinematography: Saurabh Goswami
- Edited by: Hemal Kothari
- Music by: Songs: Sajid–Wajid; Background Score: Sanjoy Chowdhury
- Production company: Arbaaz Khan Productions
- Distributed by: Kinesis Films
- Release date: 23 January 2015
- Running time: 93 minutes
- Country: India
- Language: Hindi

Dolly Ki Doli (transl. Dolly's palanquin) is a 2015 Indian Hindi-language comedy-drama film, directed by debutant Abhishek Dogra and produced by actor Arbaaz Khan under his production house Arbaaz Khan Productions. The film stars Sonam Kapoor in the title role and also features Pulkit Samrat, Rajkummar Rao and Varun Sharma. The film was released on 23 January 2015. The trailer for the film was released in December 2014, on the anniversary of Malaika and Arbaaz. It is a remake of the 2013 Punjabi film R.S.V.P. - Ronde Saare Vyah Picho.

Kapoor's performance was praised, earning her a Best Actress nomination at the 61st Filmfare Awards.

== Plot ==
The film centres around a young woman, Dolly (Sonam Kapoor), who is a con artist. She marries men from different religions and runs away with their wealth on the night of the wedding with their money. Her entire family consists of con artists. The first man she cons is Sonu Sherawat (Rajkummar Rao). After conning a number of rich men, she gets media attention, who label her as a "looteri dulhan" (bride thief). Officer Robin Singh (Pulkit Samrat) is assigned the duty to catch Dolly. When she tries to con an innocent Delhi boy Manjot (Varun Sharma), she mistakenly lets people take a picture of her which are then splashed all over the media, forcing them to hide from public for a few months.

After 6 months, when Dolly and her gang again try to con Prince Aditya Singh (Saif Ali Khan), who recently came from abroad, they are arrested by Robin Singh. Then it is revealed that Robin Singh and Dolly have a past which provoked Dolly to be a con artist in the first place. She is put behind bars but she escapes with Robin's help and they get married. But she leaves him too and regroups with her old gang members and goes in search of their next victim.

== Cast ==
- Sonam Kapoor as Dolly Singh/Dolly Dubey/Madhuri Chawla/Bhagyashree Sherawat/Priya Saluja/Kisi Kaam Ki Nahin Nalli
- Pulkit Samrat as Inspector Robin Singh
- Rajkummar Rao as Sonu Sherawat
- Varun Sharma as Manjot Singh Chadda
- Dilraj Singh Hada as Peter
- Mohammed Zeeshan Ayyub as Jagdish “Raju” Dubey/Jagdish Singh, Dolly's fake brother
- Manoj Joshi as Dubeyji/Major SK Singh, Dolly's fake father
- Rajesh Sharma as Ramesh Sherawat, Sonu's Father
- Gulfam Khan as Gauri Sherawat, Sonu's Mother
- Archana Puran Singh as Manjot's Mother
- Mubeen Saudagar as Ibrahim
- Brijendra Kala as Sub-Inspector Khan
- Vibha Chibber as Commissioner Kiran Chaudhary
- Saif Ali Khan in a cameo appearance as Prince Aditya Singh
- Malaika Arora Khan in a special appearance in the song "Fashion Khatam Muhjpe"

== Soundtrack ==
Dolly Ki Doli

Soundtrack album by Sajid–Wajid
- Genre: Feature Film Soundtrack
- Label: T-Series

All music is composed by Sajid–Wajid and lyrics are penned by Irfan Kamal.

Dolly Ki Doli
| No. | Title | Lyrics | Singer(s) | Length |
|---|---|---|---|---|
| 1. | "Phatte Tak Nachana" | Danish Sabri | Sunidhi Chauhan | 04:42 |
| 2. | "Dolly Ki Doli" | Irfan Kamal | Divya Kumar | 04:56 |
| 3. | "Fashion Khatam Mujhpe" | Irfan Kamal | Mamta Sharma, Wajid, Shabab Sabri | 04:24 |
| 4. | "Mere Naina Kafir Hogaye" | Kumaar | Rahat Fateh Ali Khan | 04:55 |
| 5. | "Babaji Ka Thullu" | Danish Sabri | Wajid, Danish Sabri | 04:48 |

== Reception ==
Bollywood Hungama described the film "a solid entertainer that will surely entertain the masses and classes alike" and gave it 4.5 out of 5 stars.
