= Battle for Bittora =

2010 novel by Anuja Chauhan

- Author: Anuja Chauhan
- Language: English
- Publisher: HarperCollins
- Publication date: 2010
- Publication place: India
- Preceded by: The Zoya Factor
- Followed by: Those Pricey Thakur Girls

Battle for Bittora is a novel by Indian writer and advertiser Anuja Chauhan. It is her second novel after The Zoya Factor.

== Plot ==
Jinni is a common woman of 25 years, lives in Mumbai, works in an animation studio and is very happy with her ordinary and independent life. Everything is normal until she receives a call from her grandmother telling her that she should return to her hometown Bittora; Jinni does not want to return at first but after frequent calls from her grandmother finally relents. When she arrives in Bittora she finds a place very different from the one she remembered—one only she can return to normality.

== Main characters ==
- Sarojini Pande (Jinni)
- Zain Altaf Khan
- Gaiman Tagore Rumi
- Pushpa Pande (Jiji)
- Tawny Suleiman
- Rocket Singh

== Film adaptation ==
Hindi film producer, Rhea Kapoor was reported to be producing a film based on the novel. As of 2025, the film has been shelved.
