= Anuja Chauhan =

Indian writer

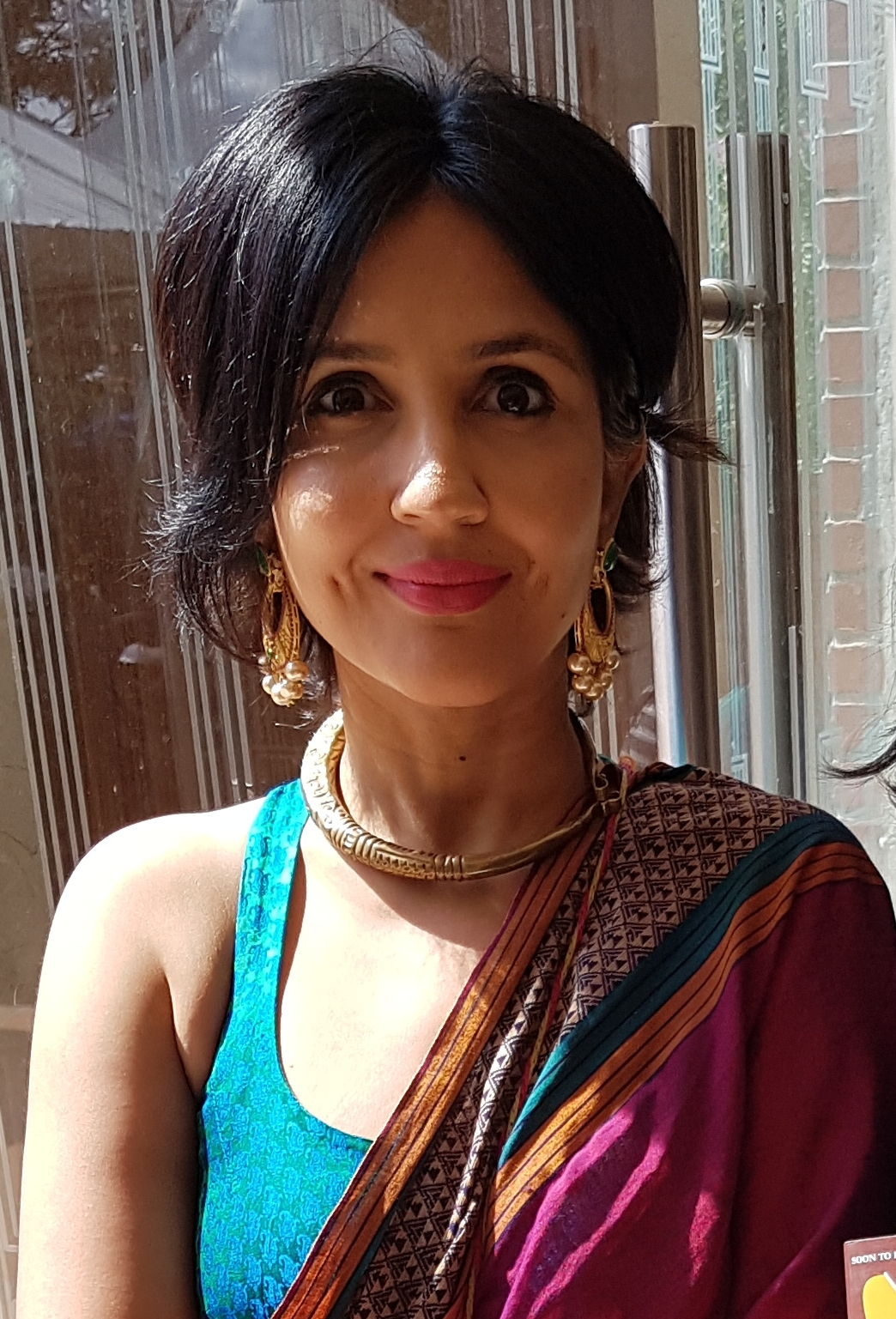
- Chauhan at the Bangalore Literature Fest in 2017
- Born: Meerut, Uttar Pradesh, India
- Occupation: Writer
- Spouse: Niret Alva
- Relatives: Nandini Bajpai (sister)

Anuja Chauhan is an Indian novelist and screenwriter. As a writer, she is known for The Zoya Factor (2008), Battle For Bittora (2010), Those Pricey Thakur Girls (2013), The House That BJ Built (2015), Baaz (2017), Club You To Death (2021), and The Fast and the Dead (2023).

== Early life and education ==
Born in the north Indian state of Uttar Pradesh, Chauhan spent most of her childhood in various cantonment towns in North India, as her father served in the Indian Army. He took premature retirement at the rank of Lieutenant Colonel, migrating to Australia thereafter. She is the youngest of four sisters: Padmini, Rohini, Nandini, and Anuja. Her older sister Nandini Bajpai is also an author.

Chauhan did her schooling at the Army Public School, New Delhi, Sophia Girls Convent, Meerut Cantonment, and Delhi Public School, Mathura Road, New Delhi. She has a bachelor's degree in economics from Miranda House, Delhi University, and a post graduate diploma in mass communication from the Royal Melbourne Institute of Technology.

== Career ==
=== Advertising ===
Chauhan joined JWT in 1993 and in the next seventeen years was responsible for many memorable catchphrases, primarily for Pepsi Cola, India, such as "Yeh Dil Maange More!", "Mera Number Kab Aayega","Nothing official about it" and " Oye Bubbly". Over the years she worked with brands like Pepsi, Kurkure, Mountain Dew and Nokia, creating Pepsi's "Nothing official about it" campaign and advertising slogans such as Pepsi's "Yeh Dil Maange More" and "Oye Bubbly". Other popular catchphrases she worked on include Darr ke Aage Jeet Hai for Mountain Dew, Tedha Hai par Mera Hai for Kurkure, "Be a Little Dillogical", for Lays Chips and KitKat Break Banta Hai for Nestle Kit Kat. By 2003 and at age 33, she was one of the youngest vice-presidents in JWT. She features regularly in The Economic Times supplement Brand Equity's list of the ten hottest creative directors in India, and was ranked 26th in the 'creativerankings 2010', a list of the leading executive creative directors in Asia-Pac.

In August 2010, she resigned from her post of vice-president and Executive Creative Director at JWT to pursue a career in writing. She has remained active as an advertising consultant and was the only Indian to feature on the One Show Jury for the year 2011. In 2014, she started working on the Pepsi brand again, as a consultant for the Power of One team at JWT.

=== Author ===
She started working on her first novel in 2006. Cricket became the setting of her novel The Zoya Factor, after her work on the Pepsi brand for 13 years and close association with cricket advertising. The Zoya Factor ran the danger of being dismissed as 'Mills and Boon-ish' but most reviewers were quick to praise the depth of the author's characters, her wicked descriptions and the authenticity of her Hinglish laced dialogue.

The Zoya Factor was optioned for a film by Shah Rukh Khans Red Chillies Entertainment production company. The option was for three years. Subsequently, the rights were purchased by Pooja Shetty Deora's Walkwater Films.

Her book Battle for Bittora was released in 2010 by actor Saif Ali Khan in Delhi in October 2010, to critical approval from India Today, Outlook, The Week and Tehelka magazines.

Tehelka called it a "worthy successor to The Zoya Factor." According to Ira Pande, in Outlook magazine, Chauhan 'manages to legitimise a new vocabulary emerging from the violent collision between Bharat and India that has all the promise of a new lingua franca. In the way that Piyush Pandey, Prasoon Joshi and A. R. Rahman have brought a whiff of newness into lyrics and jingles, this new language may outrage purists but describes perfectly memorable Indian sense-impressions, such as Bhainscafe, the brew that marries instant coffee with nauseatingly rich buffalo milk.' The Hindustan Times is its review commended the book for its treatment, while giving the "biggest vote" to novel's characterisation.

The film rights for Battle of Bittora were purchased by the film production company Saregama for three years for an undisclosed sum, and then sold to Anil Kapoor Film Company. A film starring Fawad Khan and Sonam Kapoor, produced by Rhea Kapoor has been announced. Shooting will commence in November 2015.

In early 2015, she moved from her long-time publishers HarperCollins India, to Westland, to 'try something new and reach out to more people.' The parting from Harper was 'cordial' and they continued to publish her backlist.

The trailer for "The House that BJ Built" was launched on 15 May 2015. India Today said 'Chauhan is at the top of her game as she explores love and real estate in Delhi "It's a funny, feisty novel, with her trademark, exuberant, golgappa dialogue-Hindi deliciously spooned and scooped into English to tart it up-in place and some moments that you at once recognise as pure Bollywood."

LiveMint's review of the book said "The House That BJ Built gives its readers, and its characters, exactly what they paid for."

Her fifth novel Baaz was released in 2017.

She released her sixth novel Club You To Death in February 2021. It is her first murder mystery. In July 2021, Dinesh Vijan acquired the rights to make a film version. The film, set to release on Netflix on 15 March 2024, is titled Murder Mubarak, and directed by Homi Adajania, stars Pankaj Tripathi is the lead role as ACP Bhavani Singh. The ensemble cast includes Dimple Kapadia, Karishma Kapoor, Tisca Chopra, Sanjay Kapoor, Vijay Verma and Sara Ali Khan.

Her seventh novel, The Fast and the Dead, came out in 2023.

== Bibliography ==
- The Zoya Factor. 2008. HarperCollins. ISBN 81-7223-748-0.
- Battle For Bittora: The Story Of India's Most Passionate Lok Sabha Contest!. 2010, HarperCollins. ISBN 978-93-5029-002-6
- Those Pricey Thakur Girls (January 2013) Harper-Collins.
- The House That BJ Built (May 2015) Westland. ISBN 978-93-85152-18-4
- Baaz (April 2017) HarperCollins
- Club You To Death (February 2021) HarperCollins
- The Fast and the Dead (February 2021) HarperCollins

== Filmography ==
Year	Film	Director	Contribution	Notes
2019	The Zoya Factor	Abhishek Sharma	Dialogues	Adaptation of The Zoya Factor novel
2024	Murder Mubarak	Homi Adajania	Story	Adaptation of Club you to death novel

== Honors and awards ==
Chauhan was featured in Femina magazine's list of the 50 most beautiful women in India in 2011 and in MSN's The Influentials, a list of the top 50 most powerful women in the country. In 2017, she won the Femina Women Achievers Award, in the Literary contribution category. In 2018, she was awarded for her contributuion to Literature, by the FICCI Ladies Organization.

The Zoya Factor has won Cosmopolitan Magazine, India's Fun Fearless Female award for literature (2008) and the India Today Woman award for Woman as Storyteller (2009). It was longlisted for the India Plaza Golden Quill (2009).

== Personal life ==
Chauhan is married to the television presenter and producer, Niret Alva. The two met in Delhi in 1989, during the production of a college play. They married in 1994. They have three children, and Chauhan's mother-in-law is Margaret Alva, a senior leader of the Indian National Congress, the former General Secretary of the All India Congress Committee and the former Governor of the desert state of Rajasthan.

== See also ==
- List of Indian writers
