= Siddhant Behl =

Indian actor

- Born: New Delhi, India
- Occupation: Actor
- Years active: 2016–present

Siddhant Behl is an Indian actor, writer and theatre artist. He debuted in Bollywood as a lead actor with the 2016 film Jugni, starring Sugandha Garg and directed by Shefali Bhushan.

== Career ==
Behl started his career in theatre, which he believes helped him improve his skills. He was a part of the popular theatre group, Act One, based in New Delhi. Behl played the role of Mastana, a singer, in the film Jugni.

== Filmography ==
Year	Title	Roles
2007	Amal	Harish Jayaram
2016	Jugni	Mastana
