= Sikandar Kher =

Indian actor

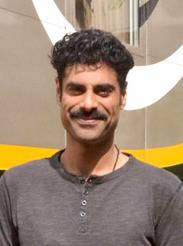
- Kher promoting Tere Bin Laden 2 in 2016
- Born: Sikandar Berry; 31 October 1982 (age 43)
- Education: The Doon School
- Occupation: Actor
- Years active: 2008–present
- Parents: Kirron Kher (mother); Anupam Kher (stepfather)

Sikandar Kher (born 31 October 1982) is an Indian actor. He made his acting debut with the film Woodstock Villa (2008). In the subsequent years, Kher went to be a part of multi-starrers such as Khelein Hum Jee Jaan Sey (2010), Players (2012), Aurangzeb (2013), Tere Bin Laden: Dead or Alive (2016) and The Zoya Factor (2019).

In 2020, he appeared in a pivotal role in the Indian crime drama series, Aarya. Kher has also been a part of Sense8, an American science fiction show in 2017.

== Early life and education ==
Kher was born on 31 October 1982 and is the son of actress and politician Kirron Kher and her first husband Gautam Berry. He is the stepson of actor Anupam Kher. He attended The Doon School in Dehradun. He then joined the short-term six-month theatre course at the National School of Drama.

== Career ==
Kher got his first break in acting from producer Sanjay Gupta in the film, Woodstock Villa. The film's review by Hindustan Times said that his performance was limited by the film's screenplay and direction. On the other hand, Times of India said that he had a screen presence. CNN-IBN's Rajeev Masand, who was highly critical about the movie, said that Sikander had an "engaging presence and impressive dialogue delivery."

In the subsequent years, Kher went to be a part of multi-starrers such as Ashutosh Gowariker's Khelein Hum Jee Jaan Sey, Abbas-Mustan's thriller Players and Aurangzeb starring Rishi Kapoor and Arjun Kapoor, among others. He was hailed for his comic timing in films like Tere Bin Laden 2 and Sonam K Ahuja starrer The Zoya Factor. Appreciating his performance in the latter, Monika Rawal Kukreja from Hindustan Times, in her review of the film, wrote, “Sikander Kher as Zoya's brother Zorawar delivers some clever comic punches.”

In late 2021, he starred in an Akshay Kumar and Katrina Kaif starer action film, Sooryavanshi.

Kher is a member of the International Film and Television Club of Asian Academy Of Film & Television, Noida.

== Personal life ==
In January 2016, Kher got engaged to Priya Singh, the cousin of actress Sonam Kapoor. In March 2016, the engagement between Sikandar and Priya had been called off.

== Filmography ==
=== Films ===
Year	Title	Role	Notes
1997	Dil To Pagal Hai	—N/a	Assistant director
2002	Devdas	—N/a	Assistant director
2008	Woodstock Villa	Sameer / Akshay Kapadia	
2008	Summer 2007	Rahul 'Butter' Sharma	
2010	Khelein Hum Jee Jaan Sey	Nirmal Sen	
2011	Game	Sunil Srivastav	
2012	Players	Bilal	
2013	Aurangzeb	Inspector Dev Phogat	
2016	Tere Bin Laden 2	David DoSomething / David Chaddha	
2017	Cereal Killer	—N/a	Short film; director and writer
2019	Milan Talkies	Guru Panda	
2019	Romeo Akbar Walter	Col. Khudabaksh Khan	
2019	The Zoya Factor	Zoravar Singh Solanki	
2021	Sooryavanshi	John Mascarenhas	
2022	Monica, O My Darling	Nishikant Adhikari	
2024	Dukaan	Sumer	
2024	Monkey Man	Rana Singh	American film
2024	Jigra	Himself	Cameo appearance
2025	Jassi Weds Jassi	Jaswinder/Jassi	
2026	Ikkis	Risaldar Sagat Singh	
2026	Baby Do Die Do	Zafar Katkar	
2026	Prahaar: The Untold Story of Ujjwal Nikam	Abbas Kazmi	

=== Television ===
Year	Title	Role	Platform	Notes
2016	24	Haroon Sherchand	Colors TV	
2017	Sense8	Rudra	Netflix	Episode: Polyphony
2020	The Chargesheet: Innocent Or Guilty?	Vidhur Mehra	ZEE5	
2020	Mum Bhai	Rama Shetty	ALTBalaji & ZEE5	
2020–2021	Aarya	Daulat	Disney+ Hotstar	
2022	TVF Pitchers	Prabhas Mehta	ZEE5	
2023	Tooth Pari: When Love Bites	Kartik Pal	Netflix	
2024	Citadel: Honey Bunny	Shaan	Amazon Prime Video	
2026	Glory	Kookie Yadav	Netflix	
