= Bring On the Night (disambiguation) =

Bring On the Night is a 1986 live album by Sting recorded over the course of several live shows in 1985.

Bring On the Night may also refer to:

- "Bring On the Night" (song), by The Police from Reggatta de Blanc
- Bring On the Night (film), a 1985 documentary film on Sting
- "Bring On the Night" (Buffy the Vampire Slayer), a 2002 television episode
- Bring On the Night (TV series), an Indian TV show premiered in 2012
- "Bring On the Night", a song by Bruce Springsteen from Tracks
- "Bring On the Night", a 2015 song by The Corrs from White Light
