= Coffee Bloom =

- Directed by: Manu Warrier
- Written by: Sharath Parvathavani; Manu Warrier
- Produced by: Harish Amin
- Starring: Arjun Mathur; Sugandha Garg; Mohan Kapoor; Nandini Sen; Ishwari Bose-Bhattacharya
- Music by: Prasad Ruparel
- Production company: Speaking Tree Productions
- Distributed by: Long Live Cinema Pvt Ltd.
- Release dates: 20 October 2014 (Mumbai Film Festival); 6 March 2015
- Running time: 90 minutes
- Countries: India, USA
- Language: Hindi

Coffee Bloom is a 2014 Indian romantic drama film directed by debutant director Manu Warrier. It stars Arjun Mathur and Sugandha Garg in lead roles. The film is produced by Speaking Tree Productions. It tells the story of a young man Dev, who sells his family coffee estate as a statement underlining his renunciation of the world.

The film was premiered at Mumbai Film Festival, organized by Mumbai Academy of the Moving Image (MAMI), last year under the 'New Faces of Indian Cinema' category. The film was released in India, USA and UK on 6 March 2015.

== Plot ==
Dev Arjun Mathur, though a self-proclaimed wise man finds comfort in being a loser, having given up on life as a result of a love gone wrong. A life-changing event takes him on a journey to a coffee plantation. There he meets Anika Sugandha Garg, once the love of his life, now his boss. Love blooms in an idyllic setting, bringing Dev out of his self-imposed funk and Dev finds a new reason to live. A terrible misunderstanding pushes him into taking drastic measures. Much is at stake as the yearly bloom is round the corner. And Dev is confronted with his past, present, and future – all at once. He reaches the plantation where Srinivas the estate owner and Anika is his wife. Srinivas doesn't know much about coffee and relies on Dev to maintain the plantation. It is revealed that Dev consumed the poison while Anika did not and their love story ended over there. In the plantation gets some weed. Srinivas gets shot in an ambush on the plantation. Shonda confronts Dev about why he didn't tell her about Anika and didn't tell Anika that this plantation belonged to him. ASI confronts Dev and asked him how Srinivas was shot. He is brought into police custody and Anika hires a lawyer and took him out of the police custody. She informed Dev that Srinivas told everyone that he misfired the gun and gives the plantation paper to Dev. She also told him that she knows Dev sabotaged the bloom by clinically planting the rust. She and Dev both cries and part ways knowing that they broke Srinivas's trust.

== Cast ==
- Arjun Mathur
- Sugandha Garg
- Mohan Kapoor
- Sharath Parvathavani
- Nandini Sen
- Ishwari Bose-Bhattacharya
- Prerit

== Production ==
The film is produced by Speaking Tree Pictures Pvt Ltd, led by Line Producer Harish Amin. Long Live Cinema Private Limited, spearheaded by Shiladitya Bora will distribute film in Indian and USA market.

== Release ==
Coffee Bloom was released on 6 March 2015. In India, movie was released across theatres in Mumbai, Delhi, Bengaluru, Chennai, Hyderabad, Pune, Kochi and Ahmedabad. In the US, it released in Los Angeles, San Francisco Bay Area, Chicago, Seattle and New Jersey - Bergen County, and in Canada, it hit theatres in Toronto. Upon Release Coffee Bloom received positive to mixed reviews with critics praising Arjun and Sugandha's performances.

== Reception ==
Upon release Coffee Bloom opened to a mix response among critics. With glowing reviews from Martin D'Souza called "Fascinating Poetry in motion", Anna Vetticad found it "a well-acted and unexpectedly satisfying film", Bharadwaj Rangan termed it as "A well-acted drama about how the past never leaves us", Sweta Kaushal from Hindustan Times called "A warm beverage brewed at leisure", Nishi Tiwari from rediff found it to be "beautiful, poetic in parts", with positive reviews there were also negative ones from Rahul Desai of Mumbai Mirror who found the film to be "Cold and Automated". Several reviews praised the performance of the lead actors.

== Soundtrack ==
The Soundtrack was composed by Prasad Ruparel and the lyrics were penned by Pranab Gohain.

| No. | Title | Singer(s) | Length |
|---|---|---|---|
| 1. | "Guftagu" | Bhavya Pandit, Pranab Gohain | 5:49 |
| 2. | "Hey" | Pranab Gohain, Murishka D'Cruz | 4:11 |
| 3. | "Jahan Tum Ho" | Arjun Kanungo, Shalmali Kholgade | 3:43 |
| Total length: | | | 13:43 |
