= Tere Bin Laden: Dead or Alive =

2016 film directed by Abhishek Sharma

- Theatrical release poster
- Directed by: Abhishek Sharma
- Written by: Pradhuman Singh Mall; Abhishek Sharma
- Produced by: Pooja Shetty Deora; Aarti Shetty
- Starring: Manish Paul; Sikander Kher; Pradhuman Singh Mall; Mia Uyeda; Piyush Mishra
- Cinematography: Amalendu Chaudhary
- Edited by: Chandan Arora
- Music by: Songs: Ali Zafar; Ram Sampath; Akshay Verma; Iman Crosson; Background Score: Dhruv Dhalla
- Production company: Walkwater Media
- Distributed by: Phantom Films; PVR Pictures; Reliance Entertainment
- Release date: 26 February 2016
- Running time: 104 minutes
- Country: India
- Language: Hindi

Tere Bin Laden: Dead or Alive (transl. Without you Bin Laden: Dead or Alive) is a 2016 Indian satire comedy film written and directed by Abhishek Sharma. A sequel to the 2010 film Tere Bin Laden, it narrates the story of an aspiring filmmaker who bumps into an Osama bin Laden look alike, and also samples materials from the prequel. The film stars Manish Paul, Pradhuman Singh Mall, and Piyush Mishra, and was released worldwide on 26 February 2016.

== Plot ==
The story focuses on a director, Sharma, whose father owns a sweetshop and wants his son to work there. Sharma, however, wants to become a director, so he leaves for Mumbai to fulfill his dreams. While traveling in the bus, he meets Paddi Singh who notices that his face strongly resembles Osama Bin Laden's. With a new idea in mind, Singh takes him to the film producers called the Shetty Sisters, who offer opportunities to newcomers. After hearing Singh's idea, and particularly upon seeing Paddi, they are impressed.

After the film Tere Bin Laden starring Ali Zafar becomes a blockbuster, Ali embarrasses both Sharma and Paddi. Sharma wants to make the sequel to the film, but Shetty Sisters decide not to help him as Ali wants the sequel to be produced by Karan Johar. This causes a fight between Ali and Sharma. Paddi intervenes and tells the Shetty Sisters that he will do the sequel on the condition it's produced by Sharma with Ali not as the lead actor. Shetty Sisters decide to fire Ali. Everyone involved has doubts and confusion on how can the film will perform without a renowned actor. Once shooting starts, a blunder happens; Osama dies. Thus, shooting stops as they lose confidence in the film. Shetty Sisters continuously demand their money be returned although Sharma has already spent it all. Meanwhile, USA president Obama, who has assassinated Osama, must prove the assassination to the people while lacking proof. They accidentally see Paddi on TV and concoct a plan to record video of his assassination as evidence. David DoSomething disguises himself as David Chadda, visits Paddi and offers him a role in a Hollywood film. Paddi, however, will only do the film on the condition Sharma directs it. Chadda agrees and tells them that the next day their driver will come pick them up.

Elsewhere, we are introduced to Khalili, owner of a terrorist organization and a business of selling guns and bombs. Due to financial crunches, the quality of the equipment is poor and causes his people to rebel. He amends the situation by promising free food and a film of Osama's adventures. During this film, a scene appears of Paddi and Khalili being informed that Osama is dead. Khalili plans to bring Paddi and have him reassure his people that he is the best supplier of bombing equipment and guns. He then orders his men to kidnap the cast of TBL. Their first target is Ali Zafar, but they fail to abduct him due to his "Six Pack Abs". Changing course, they set on kidnapping Paddi.

Khalili's men arrive before the driver sent by David picks them up. Sharma and Paddi, under the impression this was the driver sent by David, enters the car and is unknowingly kidnapped by Khalili's men.

When Chada learns of these circumstances, he travels to Khalili's place and rescues the cast of Tere bin Ladin. Chada now wants to capture a video portraying Osama (Paddi) being shot by the American army. When Sharma becomes aware of Chada's efforts, he makes a deal with him and Khalili. Chadda pays Khalili the money he's demanded while Sharma creates a "proof movie" in which Osama (Paddi) is shot by Obama. Obama then assures Sharma he can ask for any favors. Sharma says, "One Hollywood movie". In the end, that movie is shown to be Tora Bora Nights.

== Cast ==
- Manish Paul as Sharma
- Pradhuman Singh Mall as Paddi Singh / Osama bin Laden
- Sikander Kher as David Chaddha / David DoSomething
- Mia Uyeda as Junior
- Piyush Mishra as Khalili
- Iman Crosson as Barack Obama
- Sugandha Garg
- Rahul Singh
- Chirag Vohra
- Ali Zafar as himself

== Soundtrack ==
The soundtrack of the film was released by Zee Music Company.

1. "Six Pack Abs" by Ali Zafar
2. "Mara Gaya Hai" by Akshay Verma and Iman Crosson
3. "Itemwaale" by Ram Sampath (written by Munna Dhiman)
