= Mia Uyeda =

Canadian actress, model, columnist and VJ

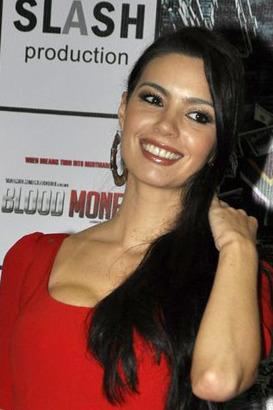
- Uyeda in April 2012
- Born: Mia Evonne Uyeda; May 25, 1980 (age 46); Vancouver, British Columbia, Canada
- Occupations: Actress, Model, VJ, Columnist
- Years active: 2007–2014
- Agent(s): Inega Model Management, India
- Television: Saturday Night Shuffle, Maharajah Route
- Website: www.inega.in/v2/talent/board/mia/

Mia Evonne Uyeda is a Canadian actress, model, columnist and VJ. She gained fame in India as a Kingfisher Calendar model and later as a VJ for shows like MTV India's show Saturday Night Shuffle.

== Early life ==
Mia Uyeda was born on 25 May 1980 in Vancouver, British Columbia, Canada. Her father was adopted, and her mother is French Canadian. She was accidentally discovered at a convenience store at the age of 14. Since then, she has modelled across Canada, Europe, America and East Asia. Eventually, at the age of 21, whilst finishing a job in Malaysia, Uyeda came to Mumbai, India.

After appearing on the runway for a fashion show, Mia was requested to try out for the annual Kingfisher Calendar. She featured in the 2007 Kingfisher Calendar She appeared in campaigns for brands like Kaya Skin Clinic, Bisleri soda, Pantaloons, Killer Loop sunglasses and Sakhi Sari. She went on to participate in the Lakme India Fashion Week. Mia rose to fame as a VJ for MTV India's show Saturday Night Shuffle. She also worked on a travel show called Maharajah Route, which was shot throughout Rajasthan, while continuing her modelling assignments. She has graced the covers of Elle and L'Officiel, and featured in FHM, Maxim, Cosmopolitan, Grazia and Femina.

Her first experience in Bollywood was in Sankat City in 2009, where she did an item number. She later appeared in Tees Maar Khan in a brief cameo and guest starred in the Yash Raj Films' serial Khotey Sikkey. Recently, Mia was a contestant in the fourth season of the television reality show Fear Factor: Khatron Ke Khiladi.

== Filmography ==
Year	Title	Role	Notes
	Saturday Night Shuffle	Herself	Talk Show
	Maharaja Route	Herself	Travel Show
2009	Sankat City	Item Song	Film
2010	Tees Mar Khan	Cameo	Film
2011	Khotey Sikkey	Uncredited Role	TV series
2011	Fear Factor: Khatron Ke Khiladi (season 4)	Herself	Reality TV Series
2012	Blood Money	Rosa	Film
2012	Cocktail	Cameo	Film
	9Xe The Show	Herself	Talk Show
2016	Tere Bin Laden: Dead or Alive	Junior	Film
