= Jugni (2016 film) =

2016 film directed by Shefali Bhushan

- Theatrical release poster
- Directed by: Shefali Bhushan
- Written by: Shefali Bhushan
- Produced by: Karan Grover; Manas Malhotra; Shefali Bhushan
- Starring: Sugandha Garg; Siddhant Behl; Sadhana Singh; Anuritta K Jha; Samir Sharma; Chandan Gill
- Cinematography: Divakar Mani
- Edited by: Navnita Sen
- Music by: Clinton Cerejo
- Production company: Dhun Productions
- Distributed by: PVR Pictures
- Release date: 22 January 2016
- Country: India
- Language: Hindi

Jugni (transl. Female firefly) is an Indian romantic musical film written and directed by debutant filmmaker Shefali Bhushan. The movie deals with a music composer who travels to a village in India in search of a golden voice. The term jugni has a double meaning; the term is usually used to connote a female firefly, while in Punjabi folk music, it refers to a narrative device in which an outside observer comments with humorous or sad remarks on occurring events.

The film is a traditional musical composed by Clinton Cerejo and consists of singing contributions from several Indian film composers including Vishal Bharadwaj and A.R. Rahman. The film was distributed by PVR Pictures and released nationwide in India on January 22, 2016. It has been selected to be shown at several film festivals, including the London Indian Film Festival, the Indian Film Festival, the Hague, the Avvantura Film Festival, Zadar, the River to River Indian Film Festival, the FOG Festival, the USA, and others.

== Plot ==
Jugni (Firefly) is the beat of the soul, the free-flying spirit. Jugni is Vibhavari or 'Vibs', a music director, working on her first big break in the Hindi film industry. When work and home affairs with her live-in boyfriend Sid (Samir Sharma) get rough, Vibs hits the road with a glint of hope to find music. The journey takes her to a village in Punjab in the search of a Bibi Saroop (Sadhana Singh), whose voice holds the promise that Vibs is searching for. As fate would have it, it turns out that Mastana, Bibi's son and a proficient singer himself, is the voice and man who winds his way into Vibs' heart. From here on, Jugni is about striking balances, making tough decisions while trying to soften the blows, and dealing with the dramatic turns and unpredictability of life. It is about finding the place one can call home; the home of the heart, where the firefly is at her brightest.

== Cast ==
- Sugandha Garg as Vibhavari
- Sadhana Singh as Bibi Saroop
- Siddhant Behl as Mastana
- Anurita Jha as Preeto
- Samir Sharma as Sidharth
- Chandan Gill as Jeeta Jazbaati
- Kartick Sitaraman as Nishant (Director)
- Devinder Daman as Babaji
- Divya Unny as TV Actress

== Soundtrack ==
The film's soundtrack comprises 12 songs and 11 songs was composed by Clinton Cerejo and the other one was composed by Kaashif sung by the Oscar winner A. R. Rahman.

Track listing
No.	Title	Lyrics	Music	Singer(s)	Length
1.	"Jugni" (Title Track)	Shellee	Clinton Cerejo	Javed Bashir	5:43
2.	"Dilaan De Saundey"	Traditional	Clinton Cerejo	Javed Bashir	4:30
3.	"Dugg Dugg Duggy"	Shellee	Clinton Cerejo	Vishal Bhardwaj	3:34
4.	"Lakhon Salaam"	Kaashif Sahib	Kaashif Sahib	A. R. Rahman	5:32
5.	"Zarre Zarre Mein Noor Bhara"	Shellee	Clinton Cerejo	Rahat Fateh Ali Khan & Jazim Sharma	7:01
6.	"Dil Ke Sang"	Shellee	Clinton Cerejo	Nakash Aziz	3:46
7.	"Hatt Mullah Mainu Rok Na"	Shellee & Baba Bulleh Shah	Clinton Cerejo	Bianca Gomes Shellee & Baba Bulleh Shah	4:14
8.	"Joban Hai Shawa"	Shellee	Clinton Cerejo	Neha Kakkar	3:11
9.	"Bolladiyaan"	Shellee	Clinton Cerejo	Rekha Bhardwaj	4:07
10.	"Heer"	Waris Shah	Clinton Cerejo	Nakash Aziz	1:36
11.	"Jugni" (Unplugged)	Shellee	Clinton Cerejo	Neha Kakkar & Javed Bashir	3:01
12.	"Hatt Mullah" (Reprise)	Shellee & Baba Bulleh Shah	Clinton Cerejo	Bianca Gomes Shellee & Baba Bulleh Shah	2:09
Total length:					48:30
