= Nitin Bali =

Indian singer (1971–2018)

- Born: 1971
- Died: 9 October 2018 (aged 46–47) Mumbai, India
- Genres: Bollywood, Redux
- Occupation: Singer
- Labels: BMG Crescendo
- Spouse(s): Ruby Bhatia (divorced), Roma Bali

Nitin Bali (1971–2018) was an Indian singer, known for his redux version of Bollywood songs.

== Biography ==
Nitin Bali was born in 1971. He was known for singing the redux version of Bollywood songs including Neele Neele Ambar Par, Chhukar Mere Man Ko, Ek Ajanbee Haseena Se and Pal Pal Dil Ke Paas. His debut album Na Jaana was released in 1998 by BMG Crescendo. He then released 6 more albums. He recorded his last song for the 2012 Hindi film Life Ki Toh Lag Gayi.

He died on 9 October 2018 in Mumbai after a car accident.

== Personal life ==
Bali was married to actress and VJ Ruby Bhatia. After divorce, he was married to actress Roma Bali in 2002.

== Albums ==
- Na Jaane (1998)
- Baliwood (2002)
- Baliwood 2 (2003)
- Balimix (2003)
- Akkha Nal Akkhian (2016)
