= Life Ki Toh Lag Gayi =

- Directed by: Rakesh Mehta
- Written by: Rakesh Mehta
- Produced by: Rakesh Mehta
- Starring: Ranvir Shorey; Kay Kay Menon; Manu Rishi; Jackie Shroff; Neha Bhasin; Neeraj Vora; Sharat Saxena; Tom Alter; Asrani
- Cinematography: Ramanan Krishna
- Edited by: Namrata Rao; Amitava Singha
- Music by: Vinay Jaiswal
- Production companies: K Sera Sera; V M Final Cut Entertainment
- Release date: 27 April 2012
- Running time: 110 mins
- Country: India
- Language: Hindi
- Box office: ₹0.32 crore

Life Ki Toh Lag Gayi is a 2012 Indian black comedy film directed and produced by Rakesh Mehta, featuring Kay Kay Menon, Ranvir Shorey, Neha Bhasin and Manu Rishi in the lead roles. The film was released on 27 April 2012 in India.

== Cast ==
- Kay Kay Menon as Salman
- Ranvir Shorey as Amol Ganguly
- Pradhuman Singh Mall as Ajoy Ghosh
- Neha Bhasin as Dolly Saluja
- Manu Rishi Chadha as A.C.P. Rajveer Singh Chautala
- Sharat Saxena as Ramakant Shetty
- Shakti Kapoor as Producer Khanna
- Rukhsar Rehman as Salman's wife Zeenat
- Kuldeep Sareen as Usman Bhai
- Snehal Dabi as Kutty, Shetty's Henchman
- Neeraj Vora as P K Lamab
- Rajesh Kamble
- Razak Khan as Prince Ratan Tanshukia
- Tom Alter
- Asrani as Nagraj Negi
- Taran Bajaj as Lovely
- Tarun Bali as Transport Minister
- Kishor Kadam as Bhosale "Assistant To ACP"

== Release ==
Initially, the film was supposed to release on 20 April 2012 but due to some objections raised by the censor board CBFC over some dialogues, the release of the film had to be postponed by a week. After making the changes asked by the censor board, the film was released on 27 April 2012.

== Reception ==
The film received negative reviews from critics. Gaurav Malanii of The Times of India criticized the film saying that, "the plot is not just unconventional but also uninteresting. The multiple tracks do not add diverse perspectives but contribute towards the common mess." Shaikh Ayaz of Rediff gave the film a rating of 1 out of 5 saying that, "Lack of imagination and an oddball cast lets down Rakesh Mehta's Life Ki Toh Lag Gayi". Blessy Chettiar of DNA India gave the film a rating of 1 out of 5 and said that, "There’s no reason to go pay and watch them on the big screen. Life Ki Toh Lag Gayi is best avoided." Martin D'Souza of Glamsham gave the film a rating of 2.5 out of 5 and said that, "Casting has let the film down big time and that is very disappointing because this film had the potential to make an impact. " Shaheen Parkar of Mid-Day gave the film a rating of 1.5 out of 5 saying that, "The story meanders around their trials and tribulations with Manu Rishi providing the light moments with the rest doing their bits in a script that has nothing much to offer." Rohit Vats of News18 said that, "'Life Ki Toh Lag Gayi' is slow but that's not the prime concern. It doesn't convey anything which was expected from a film with four characters carrying four separate notions." The critic gave the film a rating of 1.5 out of 5 and concluded his review by saying that, "'Life Ki Toh Lag Gayi' lacks a well thought out treatment which allows good actors to come up with wayward acting." Taran Adarsh of Bollywood Hungama gave the film a rating of 1.5 out of 5 and said that, "LIFE KI TOH LAG GAYI has a fascinating concept, but the writing plays the spoilsport". Shubhra Gupta of The Indian Express gave the film a rating of 2.5 out of 5 and said that, "I went in expecting nothing, and I was rewarded by a film that surprised me despite some predictable patches, and kept me engaged."

== Soundtrack ==
Life Ki Toh Lag Gayi

Soundtrack album by Vinay Jaiswal, Pardeep Kotwal
- Released: 2012
- Genre: Feature film soundtrack
- Length: 28:03
- Language: Hindi
- Label: Saga Music
External audio
- Audio Jukebox on YouTube

The soundtrack of Life Ki Toh Lag Gayi consists of 9 songs composed by Vinay Jaiswal and Pardeep Kotwal, the lyrics of which have been written by Vinay Jaiswal.

Tracklist
No.	Title	Singer(s)	Length
1.	"Deboshree"	Nitin Bali	05:11
2.	"Galiyan"	Suraj Jagan	06:14
3.	"Life Ki Toh Lag Gayi"	Suraj Jagan	05:03
4.	"Haryana Ka Sher"	Manu Rishi & Daler Mehndi	03:38
5.	"Zindagi"	Suraj Jagan	01:17
6.	"Sazaa E Maut"	Vinay Jaiswal	00:57
7.	"Haryana Ka Sher" (Remix)	Daler Mehndi	03:14
8.	"Mumbai Life Line"	Instrumental	01:33
9.	"Character Theme"	Instrumental	00:56
Total length:			28:03
