= Nandini Bajpai =

Indian author

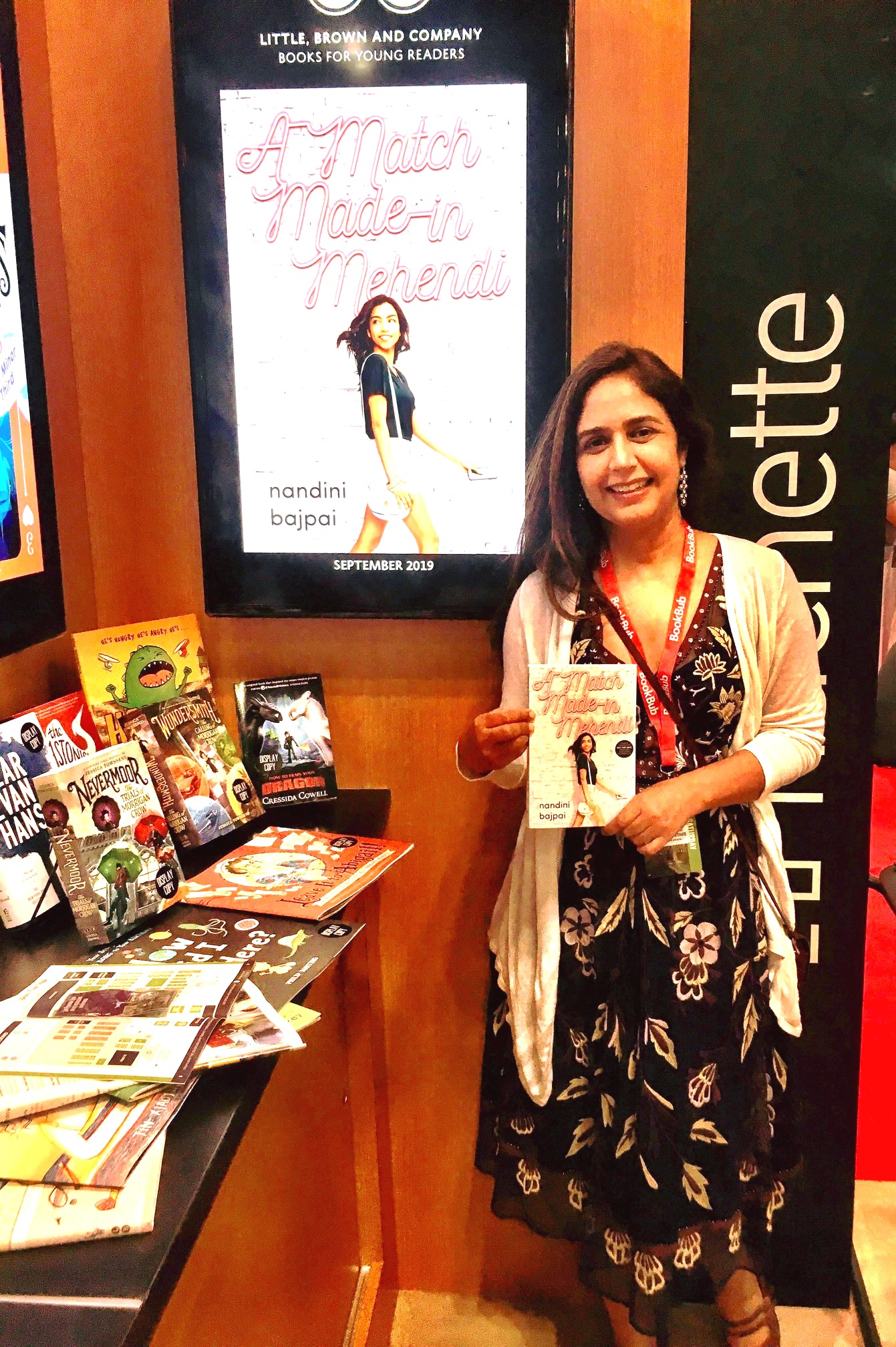
- Author Nandini Bajpai at BookCon 2019
- Born: Meerut, Uttar Pradesh, India
- Occupation: Writer
- Known for: "A Match Made in Mehendi" (2019) "Sister of the Bollywood Bride" (2021) "Red Turban White Horse" (2013) "Starcursed" (2013) "Rishi and the Karmic Cat" (2015)

Nandini Bajpai is a Boston-based author of Indian origin. Her debut young adult novel "Red Turban White Horse: My sister's hurricane wedding" was published by Scholastic India in 2013. Bajpai's book, Starcursed, a historical young adult novel, was published by Rupa Publications in November 2013. Her book Rishi and the Karmic Cat is middle grade (for children aged 9 and up) was published by Rupa Publications in September 2015. In November 2017 Nikki Garcia at Little, Brown bought Nandini Bajpai's contemporary YA novel A Match Made in Mehendi for publication in spring 2019. A Match Made in Mehendi was released in September 2019 and received good industry reviews including a starred review from Publishers Weekly. Her young adult novel Sister of the Bollywood Bride was acquired by Little Brown/Poppy for a summer 2021 release. Quite a lot of her work has been showcased in I-Ready lessons as well.

== Personal life ==
Nandini Chauhan was born in Meerut UP in a Rajput family. Her father was a military officer and she has three sisters. The youngest of the four Chauhan sisters is the well known Indian writer, Anuja Chauhan. Nandini immigrated to Australia with her family in 1991. In 1994, after her marriage, she moved to the US. She worked at Fidelity Investments in Boston until the birth of her first child. After that she became involved in volunteering with several community and animal rescue groups while also starting to write. She was nominated for the India New England Woman of the Year award in 2015.

== See also ==
- Children's literature
