= Sudipto Balav =

Indian actor

- Occupation: Actor
- Years active: 1999–present

Sudipto Balav is an Indian actor who is known for his negative roles. He is known for his works primarily in Malayalam, Hindi, and Bengali-language films.

== Career ==
In 1999, Sudipto Balav started acting in Kolkata and worked on several television shows. He also worked as a host for MTV Bakra before making his debut as an antagonist with the Malayalam film 2 Harihar Nagar (2009). He learned Malayalam to prepare for his role. He portrayed a ISI agent in Tere Bin Laden (2010). He worked on an English film titled Meridian Lines; however, the film remains unreleased. He has since starred in thirty films in various Indian languages and starred in the Hollywood film Extraction in the role of a henchman.

== Filmography ==
Year	Film	Role	Language
2007	Gandhi, My Father		Hindi
2008	Bidhatar Lekha		Bengali
2009	2 Harihar Nagar	Freddy Honai	Malayalam
2010	Tere Bin Laden	ISI agent	Hindi
2013	Action 3D		Telugu
2014	Powder	Latif Lala	Marathi
2014	Game	Shantilal	Bengali
2014	Force		Bengali
2015	Lavender	Sunny Tharakan	Malayalam
2017	Tiyaan	R.C. Shukla	Malayalam
2020	Extraction	Shadek	English
