= Positive (2007 film) =

- Movie poster for Positive.
- Directed by: Farhan Akhtar
- Written by: Rajesh Devraj
- Produced by: Ritesh Sidhwani; Farhan Akhtar
- Starring: Shabana Azmi; Boman Irani; Arjun Mathur
- Cinematography: Hemant Chaturvedi
- Edited by: Amitabh Shukla
- Music by: Ram Sampath
- Release date: 8 September 2007 (Toronto)
- Running time: 17 minutes
- Country: India
- Language: Hindi

Positive is a 2007 Indian Hindi-language short film directed by Farhan Akhtar and produced by Farhan Akhtar and Ritesh Sidhwani under their Excel Entertainment Pvt. Ltd. banner. The film starred Shabana Azmi and Boman Irani and Arjun Mathur.

Positive was a part of AIDS JaaGo (AIDS Awake), a series of four short films, directed by Mira Nair (Migration), Santosh Sivan (Prarambha), Vishal Bhardwaj (Blood Brothers) and Farhan Akhtar, in a joint initiative of Nair's Mirabai Films, voluntary organisations Avahan and Bill & Melinda Gates Foundation.

Boman Irani plays an AIDS patient, Shabana Azmi as his wife and Arjun Mathur as their son.

The film premiered at the Toronto International Film Festival in 2007.

== Plot ==
Years ago, when Abhijit was a boy, he learned his father was involved in extramarital relationships. He kept it secret for several years, until tension rose too high and he left for Cape Town.

Time passes and Abhijit is called by his mother. His father had contracted the AIDS virus. It is up to Abhijit to be the bigger person to comfort his father, even after all he had done, in the last moments of his life.

== Cast ==
- Shabana Azmi - Mrs. Soni
- Boman Irani - Mr. Soni
- Arjun Mathur - Abhijit Soni
- Krish Chawla - Young Abhijit Soni
