= Arjun Mathur =

Indian–British actor

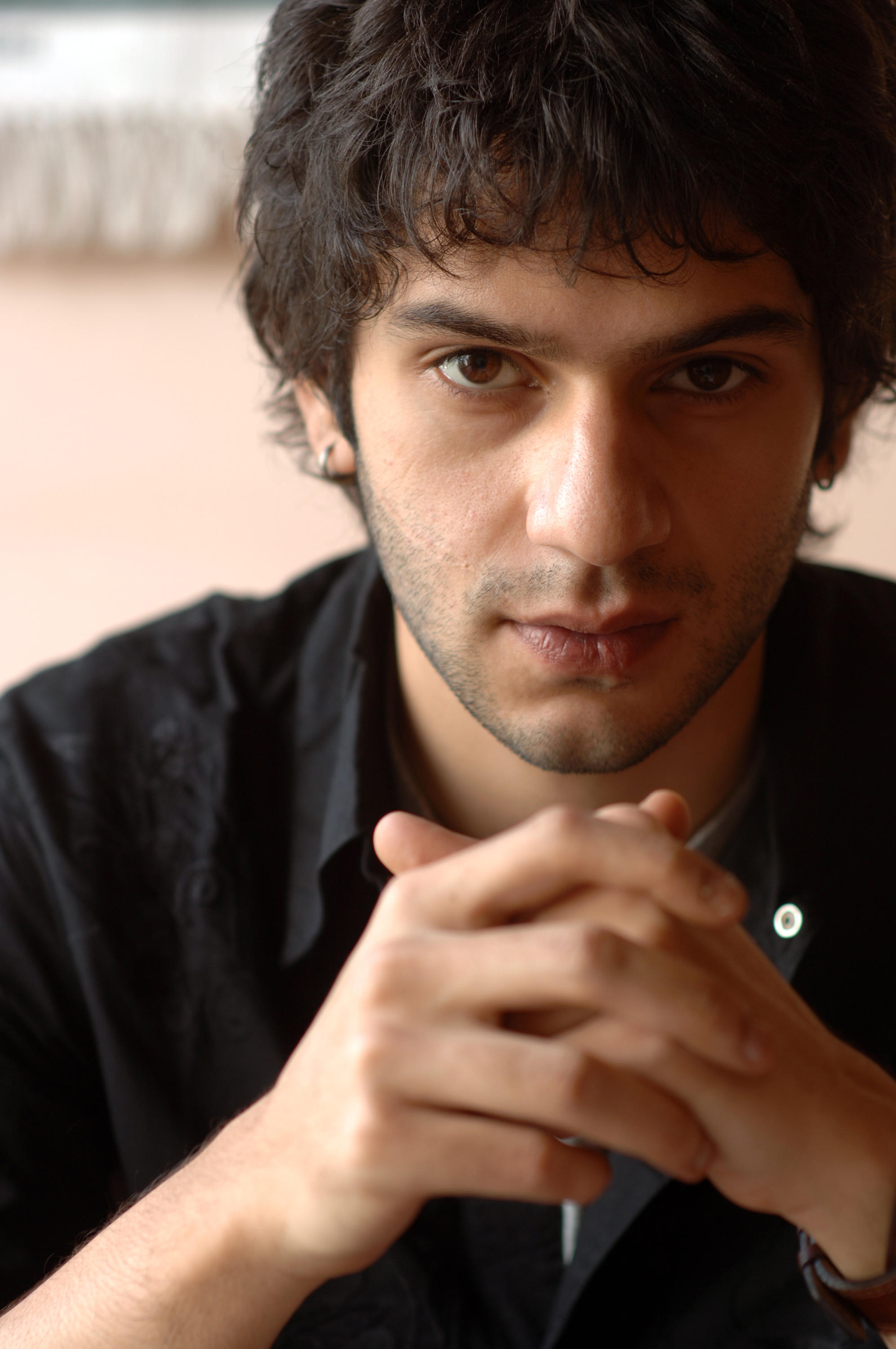
- Mathur in 2010
- Born: 18 October 1981 (age 45); London, England
- Education: St. Columbas School, New Delhi; St. Mary's School I.S.C., Mumbai; The British School, New Delhi
- Alma mater: Lee Strasberg Theatre and Film Institute, New York
- Occupation: Actor
- Years active: 2007–present
- Notable work: Made In Heaven; Indian Summers; Long Live Brij Mohan; Luck By Chance
- Spouse: Tiya Tejpal
- Parent(s): Rakesh Mathur (father); Reynoo Mathur (mother)
- Relatives: Gautam Mathur (brother); Sonia Mathur Kaul (sister); Tarun Tejpal (father-in-law)
- Awards: International Emmy Nomination for 'Best Performance by an Actor' (2020)

Arjun Mathur (born 18 October 1981) is an Indian–British actor working predominantly in Hindi films, web series and television serials. He was seen internationally in the British drama series Indian Summers and plays the lead character in the Amazon Original series Made in Heaven, the latter of which earned him an International Emmy award nomination for Best Actor.

== Early life and education ==
Mathur was born in London, England and grew up in New Delhi and Mumbai, India. His father, Rakesh Mathur, is a hotelier. He has an older brother, Gautam and a younger sister, Sonia. His mother Reynoo Mathur, died in a car accident when he was thirteen years old.

Mathur studied at St. Columbas School, New Delhi, St. Mary's School, Mumbai, The British School, New Delhi and Oaklands College, St Albans, Hertfordshire, where he completed his A-Level schooling.

He chose to not pursue a college degree and instead trained as an actor at Barry John's Institute as well as the Lee Strasberg Theatre and Film Institute in New York. Before he started acting, he worked as an Assistant Director on Bunty Aur Babli (2005) and Rang De Basanti (2006).

== Career ==
Arjun was discovered by Mira Nair and Farhan Akhtar simultaneously, through their respective short films, Migration and Positive for the "Aids Jaago" project, which premiered at the Toronto International Film Festival, 2007. This was followed by several remarkable performances in mainstream Indian films like Luck By Chance, My Name Is Khan and Ankur Arora Murder Case, as well as critically acclaimed independent films like Barah Aana, Coffee Bloom, the National-Award winning I Am and the English language film, Fireflies, for which he received a Best Actor nomination at the New York Indian Film Festival, 2013.

In 2012, he garnered praise for the youth-centric mini-series, Bring On The Night, which was the first of its kind produced in India, before the streaming revolution took hold. Arjun has appeared in numerous television commercials and was a brand-ambassador for the leading Indian lifestyle brand, Godrej from 2013 till 2016. He was also seen in Channel 4's British drama series, Indian Summers as the volatile nationalist, Naresh Banerjee. The 2018 Netflix original film, Brij Mohan Amar Rahe (transl. Long Live Brij Mohan) saw Arjun step away from his image and impress audiences and critics as an underwear salesman from Delhi, who tries to fake his own death and fails miserably.

In 2019, Arjun played the lead in Zoya Akhtar's Amazon original series, Made In Heaven and received a nomination in the Best Performance by an Actor category at the International Emmy Awards 2020, for his nuanced portrayal of a gay man living in urban India at a time when homosexuality was illegal. The show itself received worldwide audience and critical acclaim, eventually returning for a second season four years later.

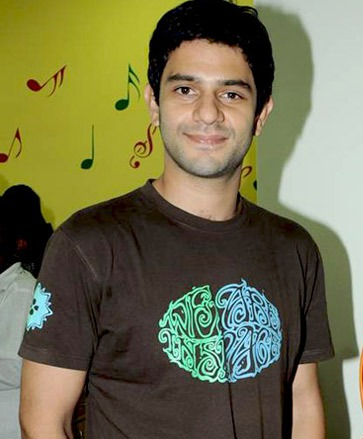
Mathur at the studio of Radio Mirchi promoting his film I Am (2010)

Arjun was also seen in The Gone Game, a suspense thriller series set/conceived, shot and released during the COVID-19 lockdown in 2020.

== Filmography ==
†	Denotes films that have not yet been released

Year	Film	Role	Language	Notes
2004	Kyun! Ho Gaya Na	Sumi	Hindi	
2007	Migration	Imran	Hindi	Short Film
2007	Positive	Abhijit	Hindi	Short Film
2009	Barah Aana	Aman	Hindi	
2009	Luck by Chance	Abhimanyu Gupta	Hindi	
2010	My Name Is Khan	Raj Burman	Hindi	
2010	Mumbai Cutting	Unnamed	Hindi	Short film (Anthology)
2010	I Am	Omar	Hindi	Short film (Anthology)
2011	My Friend Pinto	Sameer	Hindi	
2012	Fireflies	Rana Singh Rathore	English	
2013	Ankur Arora Murder Case	Dr. Romesh Mathur	Hindi	
2014	Coffee Bloom	Dev Anand Cariappa	Hindi	
2015	Angry Indian Goddesses	Zain	English/Hindi	Special appearance
2015	Waiting	Rajat	English/Hindi	Special appearance
2018	Brij Mohan Amar Rahe	Brij Mohan	Hindi	Netflix Original Film
2019	The Accidental Prime Minister	Rahul Gandhi	Hindi	
2020	Home Stories	Angad	English/Hindi	Netflix Short Film
2021	Silence... Can You Hear It?	MLA Ravi Khanna	Hindi	ZEE5
2025	Lord Curzon Ki Haveli	Rahul	Hindi	

=== Television ===
Year	Film	Role	Language	Channel/Platform	Notes
2012	Bring On The Night	Kabir Dalal (KD)	English/Hindi	MTV	Mini-series
2016	Indian Summers	Naresh Banerjee	English	Channel 4	
2019	Flip	Shiv	Hindi	Eros Now	Mini-series; episode: "Happy Birthday"
2019–present	Made in Heaven	Karan Mehra	English/Hindi	Amazon Prime Video	
2020	The Gone Game	Sahil Gujral	Hindi	Voot	
2022	Jugaadistan	Tarush Khetrapal	Hindi	Lionsgate Play	
2026	Hunkkaar	Amitabh Sinha	Hindi	Jio Hotstar	
