= Jassi Weds Jassi =

2025 Indian film by Paran Bawa

- Theatrical release poster
- Directed by: Paran Bawa
- Written by: Paran Bawa; Akshara Sanwal
- Produced by: Soma Singh Deo; Mazahir Abbas
- Starring: Harshvardhan Deo; Ranvir Shorey; Sikandar Kher; Rehmat Rattan
- Cinematography: Kush Chhabria
- Edited by: Abhijit Deshpande
- Music by: Bhanu Pratap Singh; Akshay-IP; Rev Shergill
- Production company: Divinity Studios
- Distributed by: Cinepolis
- Release date: 7 November 2025
- Running time: 121 minutes
- Country: India
- Language: Hindi

Jassi Weds Jassi is a 2025 Indian Hindi-language comedy film directed by Paran Bawa and produced by Soma Singh Deo and Mazahir Abbas under Divinity Studios. It stars Harshvardhan Deo. Ranvir Shorey, Sikandar Kher and Rehmat Rattan with an ensemble cast. The film was released on 7 November 2025.

== Synopsis ==
Set in Haldwani, Uttar Pradesh (now Uttarakhand) in 1996, the film follows Jaspreet, also known as Jassi (Harshvardhan Singh Deo), a hopeless romantic determined to find true love. His pursuit leads him to Jasmeet (Rehmat Rattan), but before he can win her heart, he faces an unexpected obstacle — Jaswinder (Sikandar Kher), also nicknamed Jassi. Along the way, his actions inadvertently disturb the lives of Sehgal (Ranvir Shorey) and his wife Sweeti (Grusha Kapoor), whose marriage is already on shaky ground. The story unfolds through a mix of humorous misunderstandings, heartfelt emotions, and touching moments centered on love and family.

== Cast ==
- Harshvardhan Deo as Jaspreet/Jassi
- Ranvir Shorey as Sehgal
- Sikandar Kher as Jaswinder/Jassi
- Rehmat Rattan as Jasmeet/Jassi
- Manu Rishi Chadha as Kartar
- Sudesh Lehri as Mammaji
- Grusha Kapoor as Sweeti Aunty
- Amit Vikram Pandey as Balbir
- Navneet Gairola as Mr. Sethi
- Harshit Verma as Happy
- Pratima Bhartia as Mami
- Supriti Batra as Mrs. Sethi
- Junaid Ali as Bittu

== Release ==
Jassi Weds Jassi was released theatrically on 7 November 2025.

== Reception ==
Archika Khurana of The Times of India rated it 2.5 stars out of 5 and said that "A rooted, clean, family-friendly comedy that celebrates 90s love with genuine warmth — even if it occasionally loses its rhythm." Anurag Singh Bohra of India Today rated it 2/5 stars and said that "The result is a film that forgets the spark of old-school romance, settling instead for its least imaginative stereotypes." Vinamra Mathur of Firstpost gave 3 stars out of 5 and said that "The biggest strength of Jassi Weds Jassi lies in its detailing and how it makes us go back in time. When was the last time you had a film that shows the central characters playing the game of Tambola?"

Jaya Dwivedie of India TV gave 3 stars out of 5 and said that "Jassi Weds Jassi is proof that true comedy requires more than loud noise, but good writing, honest acting, and a heartfelt story. It reminds us of a time when love was slow but deep, and all you needed for laughter was a strange but lovable family next door." Subhash K Jha of News 24 rated it 3/5 stars and said that "At a time when buffoonery moonlights as humour, director Pawan Bawa’s Jassi Weds Jassi throws forward a giggly googlie which might not be a chuckle fest." Simran Singh of DNA rated it 3.5/5 stars and said that "No mega budget, stellar star cast, Ranvir Shorey, Sikandar Kher, Harshh Vardhan Singh Deo’s film scores only on genuine comedy."
