= Pradhuman Singh =

Indian actor and writer (born 1983)

- Born: Pradhuman Singh Mall; 10 October 1983 (age 42); Dehradun, Uttarakhand, India
- Other name: Paddy
- Occupations: Actor and Writer
- Years active: 2010 - present
- Known for: Tere Bin Laden
- Notable work: Tere Bin Laden; Tere Bin Laden: Dead or Alive; Blackmail

Pradhuman Singh Mall (born 10 October 1983) is an Indian actor and writer. He came to limelight after he played the role of Osama Bin Laden in the film Tere Bin Laden.

Singh starred in the films Life Ki Toh Lag Gayi and Dilliwali Zaalim Girlfriend. Besides his acting, he worked as a writer and cast in the sequel Tere Bin Laden: Dead or Alive. He wrote dialogues for Blackmail (2018) film starring Irrfan Khan.

== Filmography ==
| Year | Film | Functioned As | | | |
| Year | Film | Screenwriter | Actor | Role | Notes |
|---|---|---|---|---|---|
| 2010 | Tere Bin Laden | | Yes | Osama Bin Laden | |
| 2012 | Life Ki Toh Lag Gayi | | Yes | Ajoy Ghosh | |
| 2015 | Dilliwali Zaalim Girlfriend | | Yes | Happy | |
| 2016 | Tere Bin Laden: Dead or Alive | Yes | Yes | Osama Bin Laden | |
| 2018 | Blackmail | Yes | Yes | Anand Tripathi | |
| 2019 | The Zoya Factor | Yes | Yes | | |
| 2023 | Thank You for Coming | | Yes | Jeevan Anand | |
| 2026 | Kohrra (Season 2) | | Yes | Jagdish | |
