= The Zoya Factor (film) =

2019 Indian film by Abhishek Sharma

- Theatrical release poster
- Directed by: Abhishek Sharma
- Written by: Screenplay: Neha Rakesh Sharma; Pradhuman Singh Mall; Dialogues: Anuja Chauhan; Pradhuman Singh Mall
- Story by: Anuja Chauhan
- Based on: The Zoya Factor by Anuja Chauhan
- Produced by: Fox Star Studios; Pooja Shetty; Aarrti Shetty
- Starring: Dulquer Salmaan; Sonam Kapoor
- Narrated by: Shah Rukh Khan
- Cinematography: Manoj Lobo
- Edited by: Utsav Bhagat
- Music by: Songs: Shankar–Ehsaan–Loy; Score: Indrajit Sharma; Parikshit Sharma
- Production companies: Fox Star Studios; Ad-Labs Films Limited
- Distributed by: Fox Star Studios
- Release dates: 19 September 2019 (United Arab Emirates); 20 September 2019 (India)
- Running time: 134 minutes
- Country: India
- Language: Hindi
- Budget: ₹33 crore
- Box office: est. ₹6.96 crore

The Zoya Factor is a 2019 Indian Hindi-language sports romantic drama film directed by Abhishek Sharma. Based on Anuja Chauhan's 2008 novel of the same name, the film stars Dulquer Salmaan and Sonam Kapoor in lead roles. It was released on 20 September 2019 to mixed to negative reviews from critics and became a major box office disaster. It marks the penultimate film of Kapoor till date.

== Plot ==
Zoya Singh Solanki is forever jinxed in her love life and professional life which reach an all-time low when her rich dentist boyfriend dumps her, and her boss at the ad agency grows displeased with her inefficient work. But soon, her luck sends her to Sri Lanka to shoot an ad film with the Indian cricket team. Zoya accidentally meets Nikhil Khoda, the Indian team captain who is a staunch believer of hard work and against his team's dependence on superstitions. When Zoya gets invited to a breakfast with the team, she reveals that she was born the day when India won its first World Cup. This makes the team believe that Zoya could be their lucky mascot.

Her luck rubs off sensationally when the team wins the match in Sri Lanka. This irks Nikhil, who is attracted to Zoya but is also irritated by the media for giving her the credit for their wins. Nikhil is at loggerheads with Robin, the previous captain of the Indian Cricket Team whose uncle is the President of the Board. When the Board hears about Zoya's lucky charm they decide to hire her as their Official Lucky Mascot. Nikhil is displeased with this and tells Zoya to leave immediately. An angry Zoya goes back home. Later, however, Nikhil visits her and apologizes for his actions and also expresses his true feelings for her which Zoya happily accepts. Zoya turns down the offer of the Board and pursues a relationship with Nikhil. To make Zoya return, Robin gives another Ad contract to AWB with Zoya being made the head. Zoya is extremely happy as it gives her more time with Nikhil and is a changing point in her career.

Despite trying their best to keep their relationship a secret, Robin eventually finds out about Zoya and Nikhil's affair. He warns Zoya about Nikhil's intentions claiming that Nikhil only wants Zoya for himself so that he can be the star player.

Initially, Zoya doesn't believe Robin but after he sends her a video about a previous conversation Nikhil had with a reporter where Nikhil is advised by the reporter to make Zoya fall in love with him by his charms so that she would reject the offer, Zoya is left heartbroken. She confronts Nikhil who tries to tell her that Robin is using her to get to him, but in vain. After Nikhil offers Zoya double the amount of the original contract to stay away from his team, Zoya breaks up with him and instead takes the Board's offer to become the Lucky Mascot.

Zoya becomes a sensation and is hailed as the "Cricket Goddess" as Team India continues to win matches. Zoya is given more credit by the media than the team. Nikhil requests the Board to leave Zoya out of one match which is not very important for the team. Despite being an easy match, Robin purposely loses making everyone believe Zoya is indeed their Lucky Mascot and they cannot win without her.

After being made a Goddess for an ad shoot, Zoya comes to realise that even if Team India wins The World Cup, people would believe it is because of her rather than Nikhil's hard work. Realising that both Robin and his uncle have been using her to oust Nikhil from captaincy, Zoya breaks the contract and refuses to come to the Final Match between India and Sri Lanka. Zoya apologizes to Nikhil and wishes him luck for the next day. The next morning, the BCCI calls Zoya a traitor and hundreds of people gather outside her house pelting stones.

The Indian Cricket Team are sure about their loss without Zoya but after Nikhil gives them a speech about how each one of them has worked hard to reach here and didn't need a Zoya Factor, implying that they certainly do not need one now. The team plays well and despite Robin's efforts to drown them, Team India emerges as the winner as everyone comes to believe that they do not need a Lucky Mascot for their win. Nikhil later shows up at Zoya's house claiming his love for her and they reconcile.

In the epilogue, Nikhil and Zoya get married and make it a rule to never have breakfast before a match. The Indian Cricket Team finally lets go of their superstitions and believes in working hard. Robin and his uncle are suspended by the BCCI for foul play. Zoya finally resigns from her job and opens her ad agency.

== Cast ==
- Dulquer Salmaan as Nikhil Khoda, Indian Cricket Team Captain
- Sonam Kapoor as Zoya Singh Solanki
- Sanjay Kapoor as Vijayendra Singh Solanki, Zoya's father
- Angad Bedi as Robin Rawal, Indian Cricketer
- Sikander Kher as Zorawar Singh Solanki, Zoya's brother
- Saurabh Shukla as Yashwant Khoda, Nikhil's father
- Rishi Hapawat as dentist who broke up with Zoya
- Jahid D'cruz as Bhuban
- Udit Arora as Ketan, Indian Opening Batsman
- Abhilash Chaudhary as Shivnath (Shivi), Indian opening batsman
- Jashan Singh Kohli as Navneet Singh, Indian cricketer
- Gandharv Dewan as Harvindar "Harry" Singh, Indian Cricketer
- Abhishek Madrecha as Zahid Pathan, Indian Cricketer
- Alistar Bennis as Neelo
- Vikas Mandaliya as Vishal
- Prasanna Kumara Dissanayake as Karthik
- Manu Rishi as Jogpal
- Pooja Bhamrrah as Sonali
- Koel Purie as Monika, Zoya's boss
- Pradhuman Singh
- Sachin Deshpande as Lakhi, Indian cricketer
- Shoaib Ahmed as Dabbu
- R. Bhakti Klein as Wes Hardin, Indian Coach
- Manoj Goyal as Lokey
- Simran Channa as Veena Solanki
- Arvinder Singh Gill as Jimmy
- Yogendra Tiku as Kaushik
- Himanshu Gokani as Mehra
- Madhurima Roy as Lily
- Sunikumar Nair as Siji
- Nazeem Shine as Shubash
- Mohd Sharia as policeman
- Saurav Agarwal as Kahid
- Pankaj Dheer in a guest appearance
- Anil Kapoor in a guest appearance as AK, a film actor

== Production ==
In an interview, director Abhishek Sharma described the film to Mumbai Mirror as "Cricket woven into a rom-com and touching on superstition and luck." The film is based on the novel penned by Anuja Chauhan. She has also written additional dialogues for the film. Initially, Shah Rukh Khan bought rights to film the movie. But since the project did not take off three years after, Red Chillies Entertainment lost the rights and in 2013, Pooja Shetty acquired the adaptation rights of The Zoya Factor. Nevertheless, Khan served as a narrator for the film.

=== Filming ===
Principal photography commenced in Mumbai on 29 August 2018. Dulquer Salmaan joined cast as the main lead role from 31 August 2018. The cricket sequences were filmed at DY Patil Stadium, Navi Mumbai.

== Soundtrack ==
The Zoya Factor

Soundtrack album by Shankar–Ehsaan–Loy
- Released: 18 September 2019
- Recorded: 2018–2019
- Studio: Purple Haze Studios
- Genre: Feature film soundtrack
- Length: 17:20
- Language: Hindi
- Label: Zee Music Company

Shankar–Ehsaan–Loy chronology
Saaho (2019)	The Zoya Factor (2019)	Chhapaak (2020)
External audio
- Jukebox on YouTube

The music of the film is composed by Shankar–Ehsaan–Loy while lyrics are written by Amitabh Bhattacharya.

Track listing
No.	Title	Singer(s)	Length
1.	"Kaash"	Arijit Singh, Alyssa Mendonsa	4:15
2.	"Lucky Charm"	Raghuvir Yadav, Shankar Mahadevan	3:03
3.	"Pepsi Ki Kasam"	Benny Dayal	2:41
4.	"Maheroo"	Yaseer Desai, Divya Kumar	3:52
5.	"Kaash" (Unplugged)	Arijit Singh	3:29
Total length:			17:20

== Marketing and release ==
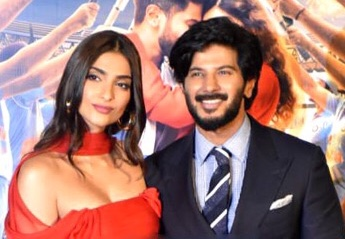
Sonam Kapoor and Dulquer Salmaan at trailer launch of The Zoya Factor

Initially the release date as 5 April 2019 was announced for the film, which was advanced to 14 June 2019, for a release during the 2019 Cricket World Cup. But finally, it was slated to release on 20 September, post the Cricket World Cup by Fox Star Studios. In February, to promote the movie, Sonam Kapoor changed her social media handles to her character's name, 'Zoya Singh Solanki'. A first look poster giving the release date of the film was released on 23 May. Release of the Sonam Kapoor – Dulquer Salmaan starrer The Zoya Factor postponed from June to 20 September. The official promo of film was released on 24 August 2019 through which the launch date of the trailer of the film has also been announced. The video appears to have been inspired by teleshopping ads. It features actor Pankaj Dheer where he introduce the 'Zoya Kavach' and tells how it helped in bringing fortune in his life. With the unique promotional strategy the makers have introduced some more new products under the 'Zoya Kavach' ahead of the trailer release. Another promotional video was released which features a look alike of Indian cricket team captain who is seen praying to God and kissing his lucky charm – the Zoya locket before getting to the crease during a match. Many promotional videos were released by the makers where people shares different stories about Zoya Kavach which helped in bringing luck in their lives. The Zoya Factor was released in United Arab Emirates on 19 September 2019, a day before its India release.

== Reception ==
=== Critical response ===
The Zoya Factor received mixed to negative reviews from critics with criticism for Kapoor's performance and character, direction, pacing, screenplay and story while Salmaan's performance received praise. On the review aggregator website Rotten Tomatoes, 42% of 12 critics' reviews are positive, with an average rating of 5.7/10.

The Times of India gave 3.5 out of 5 stars stating "The Zoya Factor is a fun, frothy film that pits superstitions versus strategy and self-belief versus luck. And delightfully uses India's cricket craze to deliver a thoroughly enjoyable, entertaining film". Priyanka Sinha Jha of News18 gave 3.5 out of 5 stating that "With its quirky premise, The Zoya Factor is light and frothy just as romcoms should be, and ticks against all boxes especially the prerequisite combo of a tall, dark and handsome hero and a good-looking yet naïve heroine."

Bollywood Hungama rated it 3 out of 5 commenting that "The Zoya Factor is a feel-good popcorn entertainer that works chiefly due to concept, treatment, humour and performances."

The Indian Express gave 2.5 out of 5 stars stating "For a rom-com which needs to be light on its feet, hitting fours and sixes as it goes along, the writing is not as supple as it should have been. Too many slog overs here".

=== Box office ===
The Zoya Factor opened to a slow start at the box office, with low occupancies. The film earned about ₹70 lakh on its opening day, it is one of lowest openers in Sonam Kapoor's career and ₹80 lakh each on the second and third day, taking its total opening weekend collection to ₹2.3 crore in India. It grossed a total of ₹3.71 crore from India and ₹3.25 crore from overseas, the film has grossed ₹6.96 crore worldwide in its final run. With a budget of ₹33 crore, the film was a box office disaster.
