= Tere Bin Laden =

2010 film directed by Abhishek Sharma

- Theatrical release poster
- Directed by: Abhishek Sharma
- Screenplay by: Abhishek Sharma; Dialogue: Mohammad Ahmed
- Story by: Abhishek Sharma
- Produced by: Pooja Shetty Deora; Aarti Shetty
- Starring: Ali Zafar; Sugandha Garg; Pradhuman Singh
- Cinematography: Santosh Thundiyil
- Music by: Score: Dhruv Dhalla; Songs: Shankar–Ehsaan–Loy; Dhruv Dhalla
- Production company: Walkwater Media
- Distributed by: BSK Network and Entertainment
- Release date: July 16, 2010 (India)
- Running time: 98 minutes
- Country: India
- Language: Hindi

Tere Bin Laden (transl. Without You, Laden / Your Bin Laden) is a 2010 Indian Hindi-language satire comedy film produced by sisters Pooja Shetty Deora and Aarti Shetty under Walkwater Media and written and directed by debutante Abhishek Sharma. Marking the Indian film debut of Pakistani actor Ali Zafar and starring Pradhuman Singh Mall in his film debut as well, it follows an ambitious young Pakistani reporter who, in his desperation to migrate to the United States, makes a fake Osama bin Laden video using a lookalike, and sells it to TV channels. The film is a spoof on Osama Bin Laden as well as a comic satire on America's war against terror and the realities of the post-9/11 world. The film was released worldwide, except in the United States and Pakistan, on 16 July 2010.

A sequel, Tere Bin Laden: Dead or Alive, was released in 2016.

== Plot ==
Ali Hassan works for Danka TV in Karachi, Pakistan, and dreams of migrating to the United States, but his visa applications are rejected for seven years straight in the aftermath of September 11 attacks. While covering a local event for his channel, he discovers Noora, a poultry farmer and Osama bin Laden lookalike, and hits upon an idea to make a fake Osama tape. He recruits his assistant Gul, colleague Lateef, makeup artist Zoya and radio jockey Qureishi in his scheme, and tricks Noora into shooting the tape under false pretenses. He then sells the tape to Majeed, the owner of Danka TV, hoping to raise money for the elusive US visa. However, the US government and Pakistani intelligence get involved once it releases, thwarting his plans and starting a war in Afghanistan. A CIA and Pakistani team, led by Ted Wood and Usman, is formed to investigate Osama's location in Pakistan.

Ali decides to defuse the situation by making another tape in which Osama declares a ceasefire with the US, and somehow manages to convince Noora and Qureishi who disapprove of his actions. During the shooting, Noora unwittingly detonates a grenade, which kills his beloved rooster. Depressed, he runs away from the studio with the Osama makeup still on, forcing Ali and the others to follow suit. Meanwhile, Ted Wood and Usman track them down and arrest the entire team. However, during their interrogation, the truth is revealed, and to save Ted's face, Ali convinces him to make his planned tape of Osama declaring a ceasefire. When the second fake tape releases, the United States accepts the offer of a ceasefire, and Ali is at last able to make it to America.

== Cast ==
- Ali Zafar as Ali Hassan
- Rahul Singh as Qureishi Ahmed
- Pradhuman Singh Mall as Noora / Osama bin Laden
- Sugandha Garg as Zoya Khan
- Nikhil Ratnaparkhi as Gul
- Piyush Mishra as Majeed Khan
- Seema Bhargav as Shabbo
- Barry John as Ted Wood (Ted-ji)
- Chirag Vohra as Lateef Hussain
- Chinmay Mandlekar as Usmaan Khan
- Rajendra Sethi as Jamal Bhai, a travel agent
- Harry Josh as Security guard
- Masood Akhtar as Goga from Rahim Yar Khan
- Sudipto Balav as an ISI agent

== Production ==
=== Development ===
Abhishek Sharma was working with Pooja Shetty Deora when he developed the idea of making a film on Osama. According to him, the idea was apparently due to a "severe" headache. "I had a severe headache one day and had tied a cloth around my head, which looked like a turban. I had a lot of facial hair then. Someone commented that I looked like Osama Bin Laden. It then struck me to do a spoof on Bin Laden", he said. He then did research on Osama bin Laden through internet by watching his tapes and prepared the first draft of the film, which was cleared by Pooja Shetty.

=== Casting ===
For the film's cast, Sharma didn't want any "established stars or people that are easily recognizable" as the film wouldn't have the "intended effect on audience". Ali Zafar was the first one to be cast. Sharma watched his music videos and decided to give the journalist's role to him as he had the "quirkiness" and "wit" to be in a comedy film. Zafar was initially cautious about the script but decided to do the film after reading the script, which he liked. He prepared for the role by watching and studying reporters and learning how they function. He attended a 10-day workshop with Barry John along with other actors of the film. Pradhuman Singh was selected to play as Osama bin Laden after an "innumerable auditions and a tedious process". The casting of Osama was "a challenge", according to Sharma. Sharma knew Singh since their days together at a workshop in the National School of Drama and according to him, Singh was "good at mimicry". They made a short film and a documentary together after which Sharma shifted to Mumbai. Singh was given an Osama tape to watch, and he later learned Arabic for eight months to get the diction.

=== Filming ===
The film crew attempted to get the locations, costume design, and language as similar as possible to that in Pakistan, and recreated the scene of Karachi to do this. The film was shot in areas of Mumbai and Hyderabad which bore resemblance to Karachi. The costumes, hoardings in Urdu, radio sets were brought from Pakistan.

== Release ==
Tere Bin Laden was released on 23 July 2010 in 344 screens across India. It was distributed by BSK Network and Entertainment Private Limited, owned by Boney Kapoor. The release of the film was delayed in the United States because the producers first wanted to gauge the film's response in other countries and also considering the sensitivity of the topic in the US. Pakistan's censor board renamed the title of the movie as Tere Bin as Zafar didn't want the people to think of the film as a biography of Osama bin Laden and Middle East countries banned the release of the film.

=== Critical reception ===
The film garnered mixed to positive reviews. Nikhat Kazmi of The Times of India, while giving it a rating of 4 out of 5 noted that "compared with recent laugh riots at box office, Tere Bin Laden has both: a smart script and some smart acting." Taran Adarsh of Bollywood Hungama gave the film a rating of 3.5 out of 5 and said, "On the whole, Tere Bin Laden is a fun-ride that makes you smile constantly and even laugh outrageously in those two hours." Rediff called the film a "brilliant satire". It further said, "Tere Bin Laden is not just a film about slapstick jokes and naughty humour. Through all the gags and jokes, one is forced to accept how willingly we compromise on our ideals and values to attain our cherished goals; how we persist in giving personal gain more importance than building a cohesive society". The film received international media attention too with The Guardian terming the film as a "satire with a sting" and felt that the film "required viewing by the American Government".

NDTV wrote: "Tere Bin Laden is one of those whacked-out satires that sounds far funnier in theory than it finally is on screen". It lauded the director Abhishek Sharma for "pulling off a parody" while combining "poultry jokes with globally-significant comments" which is "no small achievement". Rajeev Masand of CNN-IBN felt that the film "is a low-IQ comedy that succeeds in making you laugh occasionally, despite its highly improbable premise". He said that the "script is over-simplistic in its portrayal of America's cluelessness and confusion over how to deal with the terror threat, and as a result the film's final act comes off as too contrived even for a comedy".

Political analyst Jyoti Malhotra of the Arab international daily newspaper Asharq Al-Awsat saw the film as a "message for Pak–India Talks", referring to foreign ministers of India and Pakistan, who were meeting at the same time. According to her, the film, "promises to unite film-goers...an ingredient terribly dangerous for power-hungry politicians on any side."

=== Box office ===
In India, the film opened on 350 screens and collected ₹ 50 million in its opening weekend. Friday morning shows opened with 20–25% in key areas like Delhi, Mumbai, Pune, Nasik, Bangalore, and evening settled down to 35–40% with average occupancy cultivating first day gross box office of ₹ 11.1 million, with glowing reviews ranging from 3–4 star ratings and strong word of mouth from audience Saturday showed an impressive jump of 80–85% and settle down to ₹ 17.5 million, Sunday showed further jump of 66% compared to Saturday, and garnered further ₹ 21.5 million cultivating to cumulative an astounding opening weekend collection of more than ₹ 50 million gross. The film collected ₹8,200.5 million (US$85 million) at the end of its theatrical run. It was declared a surprise sleeper Hit at the box office.

== Awards and nominations ==
6th Apsara Film & Television Producers Guild Awards

Nominated

- Apsara Award for Best Story – Abhishek Sharma
- Apsara Award for Best Screenplay – Abhishek Sharma

2011 Zee Cine Awards

Nominated

- Best Male Debut – Ali Zafar
- Best Comedian – Pradhuman Singh Mall

== Soundtrack ==
Tere Bin Laden

Soundtrack album by Shankar–Ehsaan–Loy
- Released: 21 June 2010
- Genre: Film soundtrack
- Length: 25:31
- Label: Pen Music
- Producer: Shankar–Ehsaan–Loy

Shankar–Ehsaan–Loy chronology
Housefull (2010)	Tere Bin Laden (2010)	We Are Family (2010)

The soundtrack of Tere Bin Laden was released on 21 June 2010. The music directors of the film include, Shankar Mahadevan, Ehsaan Noorani, Loy Mendonca and Dhruv Dhalla while the lyrics have been penned by Jaideep Sahni

== Controversies ==
Walkwater Media, the film's production company, reportedly received threatening letters which accused the company of supporting Osama bin Laden and terrorism by making the comedy film.

Pakistan's film censor board banned the film on grounds that extremists could use it as a pretext to launch attacks.

== Sequel ==
In May 2012, it was announced that VJ-turned actor Ayushmann Khurrana will be the lead actor for the sequel. The sequel will also be produced by Pooja Shetty and directed by Abhishek Sharma. Sharma announced that Manish Paul would be playing the lead role in Tere Bin Laden 2, while Pradhuman Singh would return in the sequel and continue portraying the role of Osama bin Laden look-alike. Ali Zafar will also return in the sequel, but only for a cameo appearance apparently.

== See also ==
- List of cultural references to the September 11 attacks
