= Ruby Bhatia =

Canadian actress (born 1973)

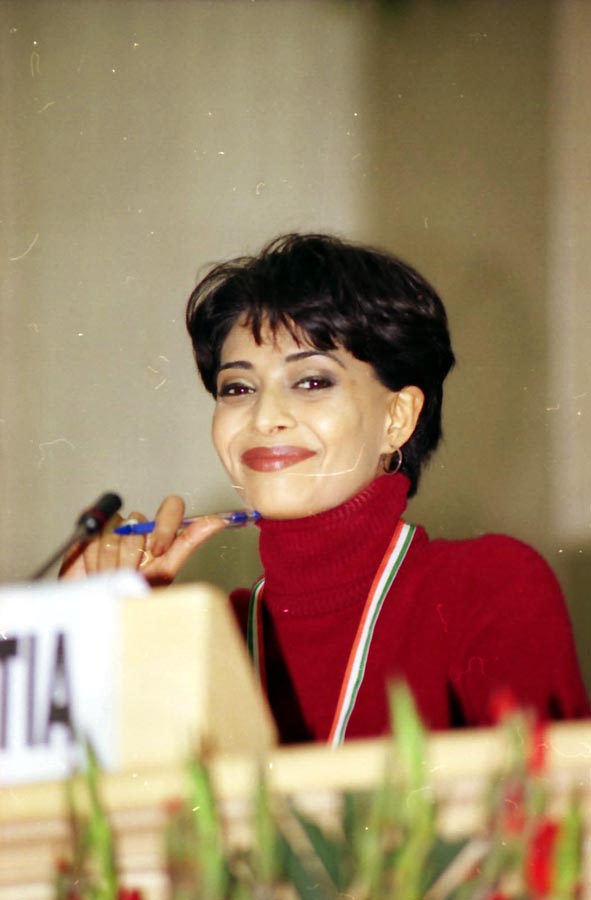
- Bhatia at the Plenary Session on "Diaspora Youth and India Blueprint for Engagement" at the 2nd Pravasi Bharatiya Divas - 2004 in New Delhi on January 9, 2004
- Born: November 1, 1973 (age 52); Ajax, Toronto, Canada
- Occupations: VJ, TV show host, compere, actress
- Years active: 1997–2008
- Spouses: Nitin Bali (m. 1996; div. 1999); Ajit S. Dutta (m. 2009)

Ruby Bhatia (born November 1, 1973) is a Canadian actress, VJ, and television show host based in India.

== Early life and background ==
Bhatia was born to Canadian parents Harbans and Premlata Bhatia. She was adopted at the age of 3 years by her uncle and aunt Prem Krishan and Saroj Bhatia. She was raised in Ajax, Ontario, a suburb of Toronto, where she studied at Archbishop Denis O'Connor Catholic High School. She won the Miss India Canadian Peagant. She was also a contestant at Femina Miss India 1994, where Aishwarya Rai and Sushmita Sen finished at the top. She studied ballet, tap, jazz and modern dance from the Toronto branch of the Royal Academy of Dance, London.

== Career ==
Bhatia won the Miss India Canada contest in 1993 and shifted to India in 1994, when she participated in Femina Miss India. She went on to become a VJ for Channel V. She hosted BPL Oye! and Filmfare Awards.

She also co-hosted the Miss World 1996 held at Bangalore with Richard Steinmetz. In 1997, she made her television debut with Yeh Hai Raaz but quit the show midway being replaced by Deepti Bhatnagar.

Later, she appeared in several Hindi serials such as Kasautii Zindagii Kay as well as in movies.

== Personal life ==
Bhatia was first married to singer Nitin Bali for three years, before getting divorced in 1999. In December 2009, she married Ajit S. Dutta.

== Filmography ==
=== Films ===
- 2001 Chori Chori Chupke Chupke as News reporter
- 2002 Bollywood Bound as herself
- 2003 Main Prem Ki Diwani Hoon as Herself
- 2006 Katputtli as Anitha
- 2008 Halla Bol as herself

=== Television ===
- 1997-1998 Yeh Hai Raaz
- 1999-2000 Dance Mastiyaan
- 2002-2003 Kasautii Zindagii Kay as Menaka Bose
- 2004 Tamanna House as Tamanna
