= The Zoya Factor =

Book by Anuja Chauhan

- Author: Anuja Chauhan
- Language: English
- Genre: Chick lit
- Publisher: HarperCollins; Westland (2016)
- Publication date: 2008
- Publication place: India
- Media type: Paperback
- ISBN: 978-9385724831

The Zoya Factor is a novel written by Anuja Chauhan, published by HarperCollins India in 2008. It is about a Rajput woman named Zoya Singh Solanki who meets the Indian Cricket Team through her job as an executive in an advertising agency and ends up becoming a lucky charm for the team for the 2011 Cricket World Cup. Chauhan started working on her debut novel in 2006, writing during her spare time. Her work on the Pepsi brand for 13 years at JWT Delhi, where she was Vice President and closely associated with cricket advertising, eventually led to cricket becoming the setting of her novel.

== Plot summary ==
Zoya Solanki is a client service rep with an advertising agency, who loves everything about her job, especially the brand she has been put in charge of – Zing Cola (Pepsi in a fictional avatar). But when she's made to leave an ad film shoot, featuring none other than Shah Rukh Khan, and has to go to Dhaka to shoot an ad with the Indian cricket team she begins to experience her first pangs of irritation towards the brand. Making matters somewhat worse, the team captain Nikhil Khoda insists on discipline as a norm and cuts her important shoot short. This causes her to stay back a few more days than anticipated and miss the Shah Rukh Khan film shoot. When the men in blue realise that Zoya was born at the very moment India won the first and the only cricket World Cup in 1983, they are startled. What intrigues them more was when they realised that having breakfast with her is followed by victories on the field, and not eating with her results in defeat. They decide she is a lucky charm.

Later, the rag tag team has a several victories and soon the cricket-crazy nation declares her a goddess. Afterwards, Zoya is invited by the president of IBCC (Indian Board of Cricket Control, a spoof of BCCI Board of Control for Cricket in India), to accompany the team to the ICC World Cup in Australia.

Pursued by international cricket boards on the one hand, and wooed by cola majors on the other, Zoya struggles to stay grounded in the thick of the World Cup action.

And it doesn't help that she keeps clashing with the new Indian skipper, who tells her that he doesn't believe in luck. Their relationship develops through attraction and antagonism. Zoya is associated with the team's belief in her being a lucky charm.

== Main characters ==
- Zoya Singh Solanki- An advertising agent born on 25 June 1983, at the exact moment that India won the Cricket World Cup who lives in Karol Bagh in Delhi with her father and his three brothers' family. She hates Nikhil Khoda in the beginning but soon a romance begins to blossom between them. Whenever she eats breakfast with the Indian Cricket Team they win the following match. This prompts the board to send her to Australia with them for the Cricket World Cup.
- Nikhil Khoda- The captain of The Indian Cricket Team. Tall, dark, and handsome. He does not believe in luck and in the beginning, thinks that Zoya is a distraction to the team. He believes that hard work and determination are the key to success. He is a man of integrity who tries to protect Zoya even when he doesn't believe about her powers. He is known to often talk like a Nike ad.
- Monita Mukherjee- Zoya's best friend who accompanies her to Australia for the World Cup. She works at AWB with Zoya, is married to a banker, and has two sons, Armaan and Aman.
- Vijayendra Singh Solanki– Zoya's father who is a widower. He was a lieutenant colonel in army and took premature retirement.
- Zorvar Singh Solanki– Zoya's brother who works in Indian Army
- Eppa– Zoya's housekeeper who is like a mom to her. She looked after Zoya and Zoravar since they were born.
- Rinku Chachi and Anita Chachi– Zoya's two aunts and among them Rinku is her favourite.
- The Indian Cricket Team

== Reception ==
The book was well received by the media. It constantly features in the Top 5 of many newspapers in India. The Asian Age ranked it No. 1 for 3 weeks when it was released. According to The Times Of India, "it is a fun read which takes the Indian chick-lit way beyond mush and smut, right to freakily naughty. Her writing is very young, very now and very funny. Her themes of cricket, love and politics are smartly topical." Apart from the novel's subject matter, cricket, that India is obsessed with, what makes the book unique in Indian publishing history is the whopping print run of 20,000 copies at the launch. "It is very unusual for any publisher in India to go in for such a huge print run for a commercial debut novel, but we were confident of The Zoya Factor right at the first time we read Anuja's manuscript," said V K Karthika, editor and publisher, HarperCollins Publishers India.

== Film adaptation ==
The novel was optioned for a film by Shahrukh Khan's Red Chillies Entertainment production company, for a period of three years. As it didn't take off after three years, the rights were acquired by Pooja Shetty. The film was released on 20 September 2019. It was directed by Abhishek Sharma and starred Dulquer Salmaan and Sonam Kapoor.
