= Bring On the Night (TV series) =

Indian television series

Bring On the Night is an Indian television miniseries that premiered on MTV India on 22 September 2012, starring Arjun Mathur, Patrick Graham, Hussain Dalal and Sarang Sathaye. The show follows Kabir "KD" Dalal, an entrepreneur in his late 20s, as he and his friends turn a 200-year-old heritage building in Mumbai into an all-night club. The series was written, conceptualized and directed by Vishwesh Krishnamoorthy.

== Plot ==
The show revolves around Kabir "KD" Dalal and his motley group of friends: Patrick Graham Fairbottom, Devang Oza and Maakad. Together with Patrick's ex-girlfriend Sheila Sethi and her friend Piyali Chaudhry, the Mistry brothers - the uptight Xerxes Mistry and the dim-witted Hoshang Mistry - and their best friend Darius Dorabjee, the group converts a dilapidated 200-year-old building into a club.

Kabir is the manager at one of Mumbai's top nightclubs. However, one night a freak mishap leaves one of the regulars dead and hundreds of people sick. As a result, the club is shut down. Later, it turns out that Maakad had unwittingly supplied impure water, which led to the incident. This turns the relationship between Kabir and Maakad sour and Kabir shuts himself in his room for weeks.

His self-confinement ends when he accompanies friends to a party at an abandoned place owned by the father of the Mistry brothers. KD is struck by the place and decides to turn it into an all-night party hangout. With his friends chipping in, he sets about the task. One thing leads to another and the club, christened "The Den", becomes Mumbai's top hangout.

Its growing popularity catches the eye of gangster/politician Ravi Jhawle. A heated exchange between Jhawle and KD leads to the club being shut down and KD landing in jail. However, with the help of the father of the Mistry brothers, the aristocratic and influential Sir Malcolm Mistry (Nikhil Kapoor), KD manages to escape. The show ends with the group bringing down Ravi Jhawle's political career, and the party continues once again.

== Cast and characters ==
- Arjun Mathur as Kabir "KD" Dalal
- Patrick Graham as Patrick Graham Fairbottom
- Hussain Dalal as Devang Oza
- Sarang Sathaye as Maakad
- Danesh Irani as Darius Dorabjee
- Afshad Kelawala as Xerxes Mistry
- Kashyap Kapoor as Hoshang Mistry
- Dilkhush Reporter as Sheila Sethi
- Geetika Tyagi as Piyali Chaudhry
- Jay Bemte as Billa
- Jagdish Chauhan as Dudu
- Ravindra Ramkant as Ravi Jhawle
- Prashant Bhosle as Inspector Dev Chakke
- Narendra Jadhav as Sub Inspector Santosh Dharane
- Preetika Chawla as Jigna Sanghvi
- Virendra Pandey as Bhikurao Mhatre
- Ravi Popat as Popat
- Jaywant Wadkar as Bhau Thakur Naik
- Alwin as Chotu Chaiwala
- Sohrab Ardeshir as Dinkoo Dorabjee
- Amar Banerjee as Azad Bhai
- Nikhil Kapoor as Malcolm Mistry
- Jai Row Kavi as Lele
- Prashant Prakash as Behzad Gazder
