= Sense8 season 2 =

American science fiction television series

Sense8
- Season 2
- Promotional poster
- Starring: Doona Bae; Jamie Clayton; Tina Desai; Tuppence Middleton; Toby Onwumere; Max Riemelt; Miguel Ángel Silvestre; Brian J. Smith; Freema Agyeman; Terrence Mann; Naveen Andrews; Daryl Hannah; Anupam Kher
- No. of episodes: 12

Release
- Original network: Netflix
- Original release: December 23, 2016 (special); May 5, 2017 (season); June 8, 2018 (finale)

Season chronology
- ← Previous; Season 1

The second and final season of Sense8, an American science fiction drama television series created by Lana and Lilly Wachowski and J. Michael Straczynski, follows eight strangers from different parts of the world who suddenly become "sensates"; human beings who are mentally and emotionally linked. The season was produced for Netflix by Lana Wachowski and her wife's Venus Castina Productions and Straczynski's Studio JMS, along with Georgeville Television and Elizabeth Bay Productions. Unpronounceable Productions was set up to oversee production for the show since the first season.

A multinational ensemble cast starring Doona Bae, Jamie Clayton, Tina Desai, Tuppence Middleton, Toby Onwumere, Max Riemelt, Miguel Ángel Silvestre, and Brian J. Smith portray the suddenly connected strangers. Onwumere replaced season one star Aml Ameen, who left the show in March 2016 during its filming. Freema Agyeman, Terrence Mann, Naveen Andrews, Daryl Hannah, and Anupam Kher also star. The episodes' scripts were written by Lana Wachowski and Straczynski, with the exception of the series finale which was written by Lana, David Mitchell, and Aleksandar Hemon. The majority of them were directed by Lana Wachowski, with the remainder being divided between the Wachowskis' frequent collaborators James McTeigue, Tom Tykwer, and Dan Glass. It was filmed in Belgium, Brazil, France, Germany, India, Italy, Kenya, Malta, Mexico, the Netherlands, South Korea, the UK, and the US.

On August 8, 2015, Netflix announced that it had renewed the show for a second season. Netflix released the first episode of the second season, a two-hour Christmas special, on December 23, 2016; the remaining 10 episodes of the season were released on May 5, 2017. Following Netflix's decision to cancel the series, a two-and-a-half-hour finale was released on June 8, 2018, as the twelfth episode of the season. The season was overall met with positive critical reception and received a Primetime Emmy Award nomination for Outstanding Cinematography for a Single-Camera Series (One Hour) and two nominations by the GLAAD Media Awards for Outstanding Drama Series and Outstanding TV Movie or Limited Series for the season proper and series finale, respectively.

== Cast ==
=== Main ===
==== The August 8th cluster ====
- Doona Bae as Sun Bak, daughter of a powerful Seoul businessman and a burgeoning star in the underground kickboxing world. Jaein Lee portrays a young Sun.
- Jamie Clayton as Nomi Marks, a trans woman hacktivist and blogger living in San Francisco with her girlfriend Amanita. She chose the name Nomi to stand for "Know Me".
- Tina Desai as Kala Rasal (née Dandekar), a university-educated pharmacist and devout Hindu in Mumbai who is engaged to marry a man she does not love.
- Tuppence Middleton as Riley Blue (née Gunnarsdóttir), an Icelanidic DJ living in London who is trying to escape a troubled past.
- Toby Onwumere as Capheus "Van Damn" Onyango, a matatu driver in Nairobi and a passionate fan of Jean-Claude Van Damme who is trying to earn money to buy AIDS medicine for his mother. Gabriel Ouma portrays a young Capheus.
- Max Riemelt as Wolfgang Bogdanow, a Berlin locksmith and safe-cracker who has unresolved issues with his late father and participates in organized crime. Mathis Wernecke and Lasse Bergmann portray a younger Wolfgang.
- Miguel Ángel Silvestre as Lito Rodriguez, a closeted actor of Spanish background living in Mexico City with his boyfriend Hernando. Ramiro Cid portrays a young Lito.
- Brian J. Smith as Will Gorski, a Chicago police officer haunted by an unsolved murder from his childhood. Speaking about the Wachowskis picking names that carry a significance for their characters, Smith said about "Will": "The whole idea of Will Gorski, the idea of someone who's got this drive to act and to do, not just to be done to. It's very central to Will's character." Maxwell Jenkins portrays a young Will.

==== Other regulars ====
- Freema Agyeman as Amanita "Neets" Caplan, Nomi's girlfriend, who later becomes an ally for the new sensates.
- Terrence Mann as Milton Bailey "Whispers" Brandt, a sensate who turned against his own kind and who is part of an organization determined to neutralize sensates, known as the Biologic Preservation Organization (BPO).
- Naveen Andrews as Jonas Maliki, a sensate from a different cluster who wants to help the newly born cluster of sensates.
- Daryl Hannah as Angelica "Angel" Turing, a sensate from the same cluster as Jonas, who becomes the "mother" of the new sensates' cluster as she activates their psychic connection.
- Anupam Kher as Sanyam Dandekar, Kala's loving father, a chef and restaurant owner.

=== Recurring ===
The recurring actors are listed by the region in which they first appear.

- In Seoul, South Korea
  - Son Suk-ku as Detective Mun
  - Youn Yuh-jung as Min-Jung
  - Lee Ki-chan as Joong-Ki Bak
  - Sara Sohn as Soo-Jin
  - San Sohn as Lina
- In San Francisco, California, United States of America
  - Michael Sommers as Bug
  - Maximilienne Ewalt as Grace
  - Anthony Cistaro as Agent Jeffrey Bendix
  - Annie Munch as Teagan Marks
  - Rhonnie Washington as Dad #1
  - Michael Willis as Dad #2
  - L. Trey Wilson as Dad #3
- In Mumbai, Maharashtra, India
  - Purab Kohli as Rajan Rasal
  - Rajiv Kachroo as Vikram
  - Sid Makkar as Ajay Kapoor
  - Natasha Rastogi as Priya Dandekar
  - Mita Vashisht as Sahana Rasal
  - Shruti Bapna as Devi
  - Huzan Mewawala as Daya Dandekar
- In London, England, United Kingdom
  - Satya Bhabha as Habib
  - Clive Wood as Richard Wilson Croome
  - Jason Thorpe as The Secretary
  - Aidan McArdle as Mitchell Taylor
- In Nairobi, Kenya
  - Paul Ogola as Jela
  - Mumbi Maina as Zakia Asalache
  - Chichi Seii as Shiro
  - Peter King Mwania as Silas Kabaka
  - Rosa Katanu as Amondi Kabaka
  - Abdu Simba as Koman Nyagah
  - Nini Wacera as Justice Abdu
  - Elsaphan Njora as Nailah
- In Berlin, Germany
  - Maximilian Mauff as Felix Bernner
  - Valeria Bilello as Lila Facchini
  - Lars Eidinger as Sebastian Fuchs
  - Martin Wuttke as Volker Bohm
  - Akira Koieyama as Maitake
- In Mexico City, Mexico
  - Alfonso Herrera as Hernando Fuentes
  - Eréndira Ibarra as Daniela Velázquez
  - Tony Dalton as Lito's agent
- In Chicago, Illinois, United States of America
  - Ness Bautista as Diego Morales
  - John Judd as Professor Kolovi
  - Janet Ulrich Brooks as Carol Cumberland
  - Joe Pantoliano as Michael Gorski
- In Amsterdam, The Netherlands
  - Kick Gurry as Puck
  - Sylvester McCoy as Old Man of Hoy
    - a sensate who is physically in Scotland
  - Sarah Kants as Bodhi
- In the woods of California, United States of America
  - Ben Cole as Todd W. McCarver
  - Erik Hayser as Raoul Pasquale (Note: Hayser's character first briefly appears, without context, in a flashback taking place in Chicago, but he is properly introduced in the Californian woods, along with the other characters that feature in the location.)
  - Teresa Navarro as Additional cluster member
- In Cambridgeshire, England, United Kingdom
  - Annabelle Dowler as Elizabeth
  - Anya McKenna Bruce as Chelsea

== Episodes ==
No. overall	No. in season	Title	Directed by	Written by	Original release date
Special
13	1	"Happy Fucking New Year." "A Christmas Special" (Note: The episode was originally announced and released as "A Christmas Special", but it was later renamed to "Happy Fucking New Year.")	Lana Wachowski	Lana Wachowski & J. Michael Straczynski	December 23, 2016
Will uses heroin to block out Whispers while hiding in a safe house with Riley. Jonas reveals to Will that his cluster is not the first to be born by Angelica and that Whispers takes medication to block his sensate abilities. Kala has married Rajan, but Wolfgang remains in her thoughts. Kabaka gifts Capheus a new matatu to repay him. The cluster celebrate their shared birthday. Joaquin releases the pictures of Lito, but Lito refuses to deny his homosexuality, upsetting his agents. He is evicted from his apartment, but his mother lovingly accepts him. Joong-Ki hires men to kill Sun in prison but she defeats them with the help of the cluster. Nomi and Amanita move in with Bug, as Nomi is still being pursued by government agents and especially Agent Bendix. Whispers intimidates Will by paying his father a visit. Felix wakes up in the hospital and returns to normal. Wolfgang is offered by his aunt and, later, territory boss Volker Bohm, the opportunity to become involved with organized crime the way his uncle was; he turns them down. Later, Bohm's hitmen perpetrate a shooting and come after Wolfgang, but he defeats them with help from the cluster.
Season
14	2	"Who Am I?"	Lana Wachowski	Lana Wachowski & J. Michael Straczynski	May 5, 2017
Will attempts to learn more about Whispers during bouts of heroin-induced semi-unconsciousness, while Riley takes care of him. Riley dupes Whispers into thinking that she and Will are still in Iceland, while they are actually in Amsterdam. Flashbacks reveal Angelica was in a relationship with Whispers. Lito, Capheus, and by extension the entire cluster, introspect on the question "Who am I?", as the two are being interviewed about their respective careers. Capheus and the reporter, Zakia, develop feelings for each other. Felix is given a nightclub by a man named Sebastian Fuchs without explanation. Lito's film premiere disappoints, as the audience no longer sees him as an action hero. Nomi and Amanita attend a lecture in Chicago by Professor Kolovi, who speaks of an early hominid called Homo sensorium that communicated telepathically and was wiped out by Homo sapiens. Kolovi recognizes Whispers in a picture as Dr. Matheson, a former student. The two visit Sara Patrell's mother and learn that "Matheson" was Sara's tutor, and that Angelica and other sensates paid her visits after Sara's disappearance. Will visits Whispers during his meeting with a BPO higher-up named Richard Wilson Croome, and identifies the location as London.
15	3	"Obligate Mutualisms"	Lana Wachowski	Lana Wachowski & J. Michael Straczynski	May 5, 2017
Lito loses his role in his upcoming big movie. He, Hernando, and Daniela decide to buy an apartment together. Men sent by Joong-Ki disguise themselves as prison guards and attempt to murder Sun, but she is saved by her cellmate Min-jung. The cluster, Amanita, and Bug help them break out. Felix and Wolfgang visit Fuchs' loft; Fuchs wants to use their underworld connections to defuse a gang war that could disturb his money laundering operation. Wolfgang discovers that Fuchs' partner, Lila Facchini, is also sensate. The two engage in sexual mind-games. The cluster visit Jonas and learn more about him and Angelica. The cluster blackmail Croome for a meeting. Will meets with Croome at the Rijksmuseum. Croome claims that BPO's mission was once to foster co-operation between sensates and humans, but after 9/11 and the war on terror, sensates were categorized as threats. He further explains that he belongs to a faction that work to revert BPO to its original mission. As a token of goodwill he provides Will with blockers, right before one of Whispers' lobotomized puppets attacks and kills him. Unable to kill Will as well, Whispers is forced to kill his own drone.
16	4	"Polyphony"	James McTeigue	Lana Wachowski & J. Michael Straczynski	May 5, 2017
Will escapes from the museum with help from the cluster. Nomi and Amanita tell Bug about sensates. Amanita is pursued by Agent Bendix but escapes. Kala meets Ajay, Rajan's friend, and becomes caught up in a riot at the temple over the new anti-religion law championed by Rajan's father. Rajan and his family receive death threats. Capheus defuses a riot over water and is interviewed about it. Riley takes Croome's pills to be studied by her friend who makes and sells party drugs. There, she meets Puck, a chemical engineer. Lito visits the father of his former lover Raoul Pasquale, a journalist who disappeared some time ago and who Lito now realizes was a sensate from the first cluster Angelica birthed. Raoul's father shows Lito a tape of Raoul's that depicts Whispers and Kolovi experimenting on puppeteering Todd, a member of Raoul's cluster who was devoutly religious and believed he was cursed. Two police officers locate Sun but she renders them unconscious. Before doing so, detective Mun recognizes Sun as his opponent in a martial arts competition. Sun and Min-jung part ways. Jonas tells the cluster he is about to be killed by BPO.
17	5	"Fear Never Fixed Anything"	James McTeigue	Lana Wachowski & J. Michael Straczynski	May 5, 2017
The cluster mourns Jonas's death. Capheus is approached by a political party and asked to stand as a candidate, but he turns them away. Sun returns to her trainer. Detective Mun also pays him a visit, telling him he wants to help Sun. Bug uses his contact with Anonymous to obtain an "E-death" kill switch which will erase all warrants and records of Nomi's existence. In exchange, the hacker, who is aware of both sensates and BPO, says that Nomi owes them a favor. Whispers visits Will and tells him his actions are for the benefit of sensates and Angelica believed in his cause. Lito cannot find a script to his liking but the São Paulo Gay Pride Parade organizers offer him the role of grand marshal. Kala starts to become suspicious of Rajan's business practices but he tells her there is no cause for concern. Lila is looking to benefit from the war between Bohm and Fuchs. Wolfgang turns down her offer. Riley and the cluster, now aware that they are not alone, organize a massive rave in Amsterdam to draw the attention of other sensates. Police sent by Whispers storm the concert hall, but Will and Riley escape.
18	6	"Isolated Above, Connected Below"	Lana Wachowski	Lana Wachowski & J. Michael Straczynski	May 5, 2017
After the rave, Riley is contacted by two sensates: the Old Man of Hoy, an elderly Scottish man, and Puck, who hid he was sensate when he first met Riley. Hoy reveals to Riley he was involved in the creation of BPO with its founder, Ruth Al-Sadaawi, a sapiens who lost her sensate twin sister to murder. Hoy uses his connections to sensates around the world to locate someone who knows the identity and whereabouts of Whispers. Riley will have to travel to Chicago to meet the informant. Sun leaves her trainer. Wolfgang and Kala consummate their connection, as do Capheus and Zakia. Capheus learns Kabaka is dating his mother, and that Kabaka too is HIV-positive. Lito hosts the Gay Pride Parade and comes out publicly in front of millions of people. Wolfgang tries to gain Lila's trust by helping her while she assassinates Bohm. With her new-found freedom, Nomi agrees to attend her sister Teagan's wedding, and also travels with Amanita to locate Angelica's cabin. Flashbacks reveal Angelica reluctantly using her neural graft research to make a lobotomized Raoul explode the cabin, her research, and himself. Pretending Raoul acted on his own, she told Whispers she would be starting over.
19	7	"I Have No Room in My Heart for Hate"	James McTeigue	Lana Wachowski & J. Michael Straczynski	May 5, 2017
Rajan admits to Kala his company does not discard the drugs found to be substandard, and Kala is heartbroken. He later asks for forgiveness. Returning from São Paulo, Lito, Hernando and Daniela are confronted by Joaquin, as well as Daniela's parents, who threaten to disown her. Lito is fired by his agents. Capheus decides to run for office and reveals his ambitions to his mother, who is initially furious, but eventually offers support. Sun visits her parents' graves, and is confronted by Detective Mun. Mun tells her that if she can beat him in a fight, she can walk free. After a long and intense fight which culminates in a kiss, Sun knocks Mun out and walks away. Whispers remote-controls Todd to perpetrate a shooting, and Nomi and Amanita realize it. Riley is visited by Bodhi, a sensate from the rave that displays a greater control of her abilities; she tells Riley she cannot help her. In Chicago, Riley is escorted by Diego, who is initially angry at Will for disappearing. Riley meets with her contact, and gets information on BPO's formation and Whispers' identity and location. When Will reaches the place, he is surprised to be visited by Jonas.
20	8	"All I Want Right Now Is One More Bullet"	Dan Glass	Lana Wachowski & J. Michael Straczynski	May 5, 2017
The Chairman of BPO saved Jonas to keep tabs on Whispers, as despite using Whispers' services to kill his opposition, he does not trust him. Whispers and his family are evacuated before Will reaches him. Mandiba, Capheus' political opponent, uses negative ads against him. Kala wonders whether she should tell Rajan about sensates and her feelings for Wolfgang, while Rajan is harboring his own secrets. Lito dreads the loss of his career. Riley investigates the ID of her contact with the help of Diego. Nomi informs Sun that Joong-Ki will be attending a gala. They hatch a plan for Sun to attend undercover as a waitress, by using Lito's bartending skills. Fuchs reveals to Wolfgang he strongly suspects Lila has negotiated with a competitor to kill Fuchs. Lila, eavesdropping through her connection with Wolfgang, calls Fuchs and makes him think Wolfgang is the one that is looking to kill him. Wolfgang attends dinner with Lila, knowing it is an ambush. She reveals her plan to make Berlin into a safe haven for sensates, free of sapiens. Wolfgang rejects her offer to join her; a shootout ensues and Wolfgang narrowly escapes. Lila tells police Wolfgang was the aggressor.
21	9	"What Family Actually Means"	Lana Wachowski	Lana Wachowski & J. Michael Straczynski	May 5, 2017
Nomi gives a speech at Teagan's rehearsal dinner, upsetting her transphobic mother who would rather hide her. The real wedding is interrupted by Agent Bendix arriving to arrest Nomi, but when confronted by Amanita he is unable to produce a warrant. Defending Nomi, her father calls her "daughter" for the first time. Riley and Diego locate the house of Carol, the BPO informant. Riley "senses" that in the past Carol helped Angelica move a lobotomized Raoul to the basement's lab. In the present, they find Carol dead, and Riley senses she saw Jonas right before killing herself. Capheus is being followed by men, revealed to be sent by Kabaka to protect him from the bounty Mandiba put on his head. Kabaka agrees that Capheus should continue his campaign, and reveals he intends to marry Capheus's mother. Daniela finds the perfect script for Lito and arranges a meeting with a top Hollywood producer. Will learns that his father is about to die and connects with him through Riley, one last time.
22	10	"If All the World's a Stage, Identity Is Nothing But a Costume"	Tom Tykwer	Lana Wachowski & J. Michael Straczynski	May 5, 2017
Grieving the loss of his father, Will relapses to heroin use. Capheus delivers his first speech as a candidate to an enormous crowd. At first it goes well, but eventually violent agitators arrive and a riot breaks out. One of his security officers tries to assassinate him. Will, Sun and Githu, the leader of the gang whom Capheus once crossed in his work for Kabaka, help him escape. Githu helps Capheus despite working for Mandiba, explaining he does not believe in Mandiba and his plans for Kibera. Will connects with Capheus and swears to never take drugs again, as he was nearly too late. Upon arrival at home, Capheus is reassured of his motives from his mother and friends. Kala formulates her own blockers. She discusses with Wolfgang about revealing to Rajan the truth and then meeting in person. Sun makes cocktails with Lito's aid, and Lito aces the audition, thanks to Sun expressing her emotions. Lito starts to socialize with the Hollywood elite and meets his co-star in the upcoming movie. Sun spots Joong-Ki at the gala, and the cluster agree to help her take him down.
23	11	"You Want a War?"	Lana Wachowski	Lana Wachowski & J. Michael Straczynski	May 5, 2017
Right before Sun can attack Joong-Ki, Mun arrives at the gala to arrest him. Joong-Ki injures Mun and escapes, but Sun, riding a motorcycle, catches up to him with the help of her cluster and manages to stop him. Contemplating her next move, she decides to let him live. She is arrested, but her cluster and Puck, who unexpectedly shows up in Seoul, help her escape. Minister Tae Park spirits away Joong-Ki. Nomi and Amanita propose to each other. Capheus is visited by sensates who attended his speech and decided to reveal themselves to him. Rajan reveals to Kala he is involved in a political corruption investigation concerning Ajay. For her protection, he wants her moved to Paris. Kala and Wolfgang profess their love for each other and decide to meet in Paris. Immediately thereafter, Whispers has Wolfgang captured, Lila having sold him out. Using Angelica's medical research on Wolfgang, Whispers discovers Kala's identity. To save Wolfgang, the cluster meets in person for the first time, travelling to London, where they kidnap Whispers and Jonas. Declaring war on the BPO, they intend to trade Whispers for Wolfgang.
Special
24	12	"Amor Vincit Omnia" (Note: Popular reordering of an excerpt from Virgil's Eclogue X, line 69, which the show translates to "Love conquers all things".)	Lana Wachowski	Lana Wachowski & David Mitchell & Aleksandar Hemon	June 8, 2018
In Paris, the cluster – with help from their aware sapien family and friends (Note: The cluster's secret is known to Amanita and Bug, Hernando and Daniela, Rajan, joined mid-Paris-adventure by Mun) – plan an exchange between Wolfgang and Whispers. They discover that Angelica faked her relationship with Whispers to locate Raoul, and that only Whispers can control the drones. Hoy connects Riley with River El-Saadawi, Ruth's daughter, leader of the pro-sensate group inside BPO. River pleads with Riley to kill Whispers so that The Chairman, who has ordered a purge of sensates and sympathizers, loses his leverage. The cluster declines. Lila facilitates the exchange for BPO, but demands a meeting with The Chairman to deliver Whispers. Bodhi connects the eight with The Mother of the Lacuna, an ancient group of sensates, who reveals she "birthed" Whispers, and his ambition to attain immortality through the drones. The heroes – joined by more of their aware sapien friends (Note: Diego and Felix join in Naples, expanding the aware sapien friends to a matching group of eight, helping to plan and fight alongside their eight sensate friends) as well as Puck's cluster – travel to Naples, where Lila and her cluster are holding Whispers. Jonas, using Angelica's secret prototype, makes a drone assassinate The Chairman, and blows up himself and the research facility. Wolfgang kills Lila and Whispers. Later, BPO's new leader, River, officiates Nomi and Amanita's wedding on the Eiffel Tower. Sun is exonerated of all charges. It is implied that Kala, Rajan, and Wolfgang may develop a polyamorous relationship. The cluster and their loved ones engage in a transcendent sexual experience.

== Production ==
=== Casting ===
On April 26, 2016, Deadline Hollywood reported that Aml Ameen abruptly left production a couple of episodes into filming of the second season over a conflict with Lana Wachowski that started during the table read for the season and progressively got worse. Both the Deadline article and Ameen's co-star on Sense8, Tuppence Middleton, suggested the conflict was over creative differences. When asked about it, Straczynski commented he was not there to know what happened between Ameen and Lana but he respects the choices of both. Subsequent to Ameen's departure, the role of Capheus was recast to Toby Onwumere after a seven-day auditioning process. Onwumere watched a few episodes of the show to prepare for his audition, as he had not seen it before. The actor said about his approach to the character: "My duty [was] not to emulate exactly what [Ameen] has done, ... but just to give it my own spin, and kind of do my own thing, and just give this character the same essence, but ... maybe a different life and a different take on it." Lana described the unexpected change of the actors as "beautiful" and "perfect", commenting that it complimented her effort to explore the nature of identity in the series. She elaborated that in her opinion Ameen was an actor that was "quite good at being innocent and boyish" and Onwumere had similar qualities but was also someone that was "ready to ... become a political leader ... and also fall in love and be sort of sensual with another body", storylines that are explored in the second season of the show.

Earlier in April, Kick Gurry, who had played parts in the Wachowskis' Speed Racer and Jupiter Ascending in the past, revealed he had been cast in the second season, after Lana called to inform him that they had written a role specifically for him. In May, Deadline Hollywood reported Ben Cole had been cast as Todd, a sensate who would rather be "normal". In September, Sylvester McCoy reportedly revealed he filmed three or four episodes of the second season of a Netflix show, later identified to be Sense8, and has signed to appear in further seasons if he is wanted. Martin Wuttke, who had minor roles in Cloud Atlas, also joined the cast in the second season.

=== Filming and locations ===
To properly tell the international aspects of the story, filming for Sense8 took place almost entirely on location around the globe. For the second season, production credited 16 cities located in 11 countries for having been part of the filming. The major locations they filmed in, include all of the first season's except Reykjavík, and the following new ones: Amsterdam, Argyll, Chippenham, Los Angeles, Malta, Positano, Redwoods, and São Paulo. Production start for the main unit of the second season was given an expected date of March 2016, but a separate shoot involving the principal actors began on December 30, 2015, in Berlin, to capture footage during the Christmas holidays. This was followed by a short two-day shoot in Chicago, on January 23 and 24, 2016. Filming resumed in Berlin in the middle of March 2016, and proceeded to Mumbai on March 25, for a 10-day shoot. On April 7, filming started in Positano. Aml Ameen did not participate in the filming, as he had decided to depart from the production. Later in April, filming moved to Mexico, with Toby Onwumere replacing the departed Ameen, and specifically to Mexico City, and for one day in Metepec. Filming in California, San Francisco, began around May 5, and lasted up to May 20. Location manager Matthew Riutta was fined by the Department of Parks and Recreation when "someone accidentally got naked", during a romantic scene set at the tree swing in Billy Goat Hill. A short two-day shoot in Los Angeles, Malibu followed, starting May 24. Filming in São Paulo took place in late May, and specifically in its 20th Gay Pride Parade on May 29. Participating in the event was a late decision taken by Lana two days before the Parade began, as the production had previously abandoned their plans for the location due to scheduling conflicts. When Lana realized she could make it fit, they flew to São Paulo and filmed in the event in front of a crowd of millions, unrehearsed. Filming in Chicago began on June 5, and wrapped up on June 15, then moved to the United Kingdom, in London, Cambridge (Chippenham Park), and Scotland (Ardkinglas Estate and Castle Stalker, for 9 days), and wrapped on July 4. Then, filming moved to the Netherlands, in Amsterdam, The Hague, and Utrecht, for about two weeks, up to July 19. In Amsterdam, they were the first production to film in the Rijksmuseum, with the real paintings of Rembrandt featured prominently in the scenes. Lana was told that insurance would never allow her to film there, but after writing an eight-page letter about what The Night Watch means to her and the importance of bringing art to the homes of those that are unable to go to Rijksmuseum, she eventually managed to get a permit. In Amsterdam's club Paradiso, they filmed Tuppence Middleton DJing with a real audience, and the rest of the cast dancing. After the Netherlands, filming proceeded to Nairobi as early as July 22, and later to South Korea, in Seoul and Bucheon, for the production's longest shoot, lasting about three weeks. Afterwards, filming moved to Berlin, until September 14, and during the same period, they also briefly returned to London to shoot outside the Houses of Parliament for two days. Filming then moved to Malta on September 18, for a two-day shoot, where they used the water tanks in Kalkara. On September 19, 2016, with the completion of the Malta shoot, filming for the second season came to an end. Overall, the cast and crew flew in excess of 250,000 miles to complete the season, while some directors and producers who also did location scouting flew as much as 370,000 miles.

Filming for the series finale took place in Berlin, Brussels, Naples, and Paris. Production began in Berlin on October 2, 2017, and moved to Brussels on October 12, where they filmed in Villers Abbey in Villers-la-Ville. The next day filming began in Paris, where they remained up to October 24. Around midnight of October 22, they filmed a four-minute fireworks show near the Eiffel Tower. Due to insufficient notices posted by the Paris City Hall, reportedly some Parisians were taken by surprise and mistook the sound of the fireworks for a terrorist attack. On October 25, production moved to Naples where it remained up to November 4. They donated €7,000 to the local community to thank them for the hospitality, and to fund the construction of a pedestrian plaza. Filming resumed in Berlin later in November, and wrapped on November 12, 2017. A picture of the clapperboard used by the production shows that they considered the special as the twelfth episode of season 2.

=== Music ===
In the Christmas special episode "Happy F*cking New Year", a cover of Leonard Cohen's "Hallelujah" is featured, recorded by the Apollo Chorus of Chicago, with the lead vocalist being Daniel Martin Moore. The sequence, which depicts the San Francisco Gay Men's Chorus singing, was originally cut to a different cover of the song, but days before the deadline of completion the licensing deal fell through, and Stoller had to order a custom version to be conducted to match their completed cut. The song was ready in five days, and the producers were happy with the result, including Netflix, which made the song a prominent feature of the special's marketing campaign. For the fifth episode of the season, "Fear Never Fixed Anything", Mounsey created a remix of "What's Up?" to be played by Riley in a club, recalling the first season's appearance of the song.

=== Finale ===
On June 1, 2017, Netflix announced that they had cancelled the series, despite preliminary negotiations with the writers and cast for a third season. However, on June 29, 2017, it was announced that due to strong fan demand, a two-hour series finale would be produced. A release date of June 8, 2018 and a final running time of 151 minutes were reported later. The episode ends with a title card that dedicates it to the fans of the show.

== Reception ==
=== Critical reception and popularity ===
Sense8 continued to be positively received in its second season. Rotten Tomatoes, a review aggregator website, indexed 15 reviews for the early released Christmas special, and reported an 87% critical approval rating for it, with an average rating of 6.88/10. The website assigned the following consensus to the special: "Sense8 serves up a heaping helping of yuletide queerness and sci-fi slyness in this narratively messy but richly felt special." Based on 28 reviews, Rotten Tomatoes assigned the 10 episodes that followed the special a critical approval rating of 93%, with an average rating of 7.57/10. The critical consensus reads, "Sense8 maintains its stunning visuals, Wachowski wackiness, and great heart -- though its individual characters deserve more development." On Metacritic, which uses a weighted average, the season was assigned a score of 73 out of 100, based on 8 reviews, indicating "generally favorable" reviews. Rotten Tomatoes also collected 28 reviews for the series finale, and calculated a 93% critical approval rating, and an average rating of 7.15/10. The finale's critical consensus reads, "A hard fought coda to a beloved series, Sense8's epilogue exemplifies its strange, sensual, somewhat silly delights."

Netflix placed the second season of Sense8 at fifth place on their list for the year 2017 about couples where one of the two cannot resist to wait, and ends up watching episodes ahead of their significant other.

=== Accolades ===
Year	Award	Category	Recipient(s)	Result	Ref(s)
2017	Emmy Awards	Outstanding Cinematography for a Single-Camera Series (One Hour)	John Toll (for: "Obligate Mutualisms")	Nominated	
2018	Dorian Awards	LGBTQ TV Show of the Year	Sense8	Nominated	
2018	GLAAD Media Awards	Outstanding Drama Series	Sense8	Nominated	
2019	Producers Guild of America Awards	Outstanding Producer of Streamed or Televised Motion Pictures	Marcus Loges, Alex Boden, Roberto Malerba, Terry Needham, John Toll, Lana Wachowski, J. Michael Straczynski, and Grant Hill (for: "Together Until the End") (Note: The actual title of the nominated episode—and series finale—is "Amor Vincit Omnia", for which Netflix used the "Together Until The End" tagline to promote it.)	Nominated	
2019	GLAAD Media Awards	Outstanding TV Movie or Limited Series	Sense8	Nominated	

== Marketing ==
On May 3, 2016, publicity stills of the ongoing production of the second season were posted online, accompanied by a short message by Lana Wachowski introducing the #Road2Sense8 hashtag under which new pictures would be posted. On December 3, 2016, the Christmas special episode was screened at São Paulo's Comic Con Experience, in advance of its Netflix premiere on December 23. The second episode of the second season was screened out of competition during the Series Mania festival in Paris, on April 18, 2017. On April 23, a screening of the second and third episodes took place in Chicago's Music Box Theatre, in a benefit for the American Civil Liberties Union, followed by Lana Wachowski taking questions from the audience, and again on April 26, in the red carpet premiere of the second season, at New York City's AMC Lincoln Square.

Several screenings of the series finale took place prior to its release on Netflix, on June 8, 2018. The first screening took place in The Music Box Theatre in Chicago, on May 25, as a benefit for EMILY's List, followed by a Q&A session with Lana and select cast members. The second screening took place in the Latin America Memorial in São Paulo, on June 1, with several cast members attending. The red carpet premiere followed in ArcLight Hollywood, in Los Angeles, on June 7. Linda Perry made a guest appearance to perform "What's Up?". Netflix organized an event for the fans on the day of the special's release, June 8, in Posillipo, in Naples, where a big portion of the special was filmed. Among other things, fans could try a slice of a special "Sense8" pizza that was created by famous pizzaiolo Gino Sorbillo with the help of the cast.
