= Sugandha Garg =

Indian actress

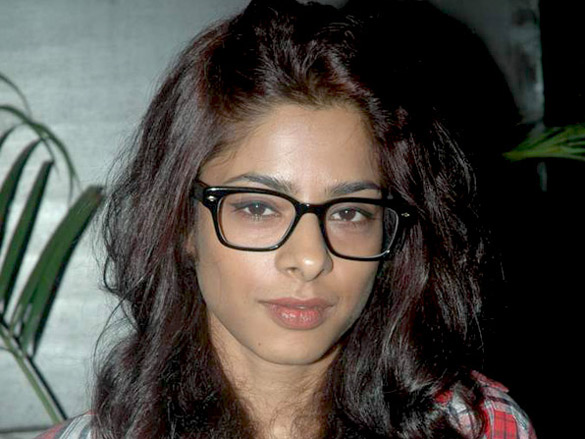
- Sugandha Garg in 2012
- Born: Meerut, Uttar Pradesh, India
- Other name: Sugandha Ram
- Occupations: Actress, TV Host, Singer, Director, Photographer
- Years active: 2008–2023
- Spouse: Raghu Ram (m. 2006; div. 2018)

Sugandha Garg is an Indian actress, singer and television host. She was last seen in Indian web series Guilty Minds.

== Career ==
Garg appeared as Shaleen in the film Jaane Tu... Ya Jaane Na (2008). She played the role of the best friend to Gayatri Patel in the movie Let's Dance, released on 19 June 2009, and appeared as a student reporter in My Name Is Khan. She has played a major role of Zoya the makeup artist in Tere Bin Laden, released on 16 July 2010. She also worked as a call center employee in the British comedy Mumbai Calling (7 epi) in 2009. In 2012 the actress was seen in film Patang.

Her next films include Santosh Sivan's Ceylon, Shefali Bushan's Jugni, the sequel of Tere Bin Laden and Manu Warrier's Coffee Bloom. In Ceylon (Inam in Tamil), she has played the role of a Sri Lankan refugee. About her performance in the film, Sivan stated that "nobody could have done what she has done here".

Garg has worked in television and hosted several shows and has been linked to many television personalities. She first hosted the show Haath Se Haath Mila for BBC when she was 18. She later hosted the shows Whats with Indian men along with Indrani Dasgupta and Season 2 of It happens only in India on Fox Traveller. She has also performed in theatre plays I Have Gone Marking and Sometimes. She performed the Assamese song "Tokari" with Papon in Coke Studio @ MTV, Season 2.

She played the role of lead Sushmita Sen's characters best friend in Aarya (TV series) as Hina Khan. She is also Sangram's love interest in the series and Jeet's mother.

== Personal life ==
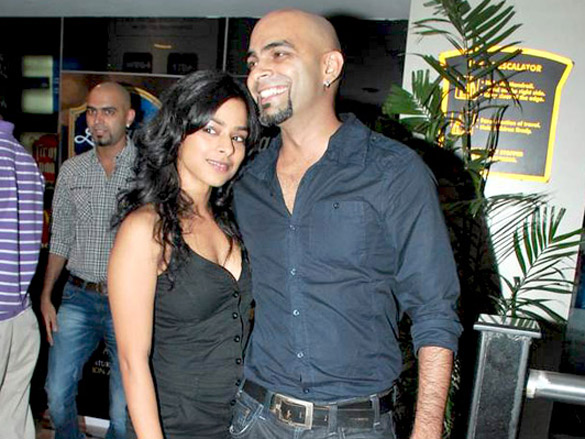
Garg with her then-husband Raghu Ram at The Antiquity-Club Fusion in 2012

Garg graduated from Maitreyi College, Delhi University. Garg married Raghu Ram, a television producer and MTV Reality Show Host in 2006. They have been officially divorced as on 30 January 2018.

== Filmography ==
=== Films ===
Year	Film	Role	Notes
2008	Jaane Tu... Ya Jaane Na	Shaleen	
2009	Let's Dance	Anoushka	
2009	Mumbai Calling		TV series
2010	My Name Is Khan	Komal (reporter)	
	Tere Bin Laden	Zoya Khan	
2011	Patang	Priya	
2014	Ceylon	Rajini	English-Tamil film
2015	Coffee Bloom	Anika	
2016	Tere Bin Laden 2	Zoya Khan	
2016	Jugni	Vibhavari	

=== Web series ===
Year	Series	Role	Language	Platform	Notes
2020–2024	Aarya	Hina Khan	Hindi	Disney+ Hotstar	
2021	Guilty Minds	Vandana Kathpalia	Hindi	Amazon Prime Video	

=== TV ===
Year	Series	Role	Language	Notes
2003	Haath Se Haath Mila	Co-host (Along with Sameer Kocchar)	Hindi	For Doordarshan
2011	What's With Indian Men	Co-host (Along with Indrani Dasgupta)	English	FOX History & Traveller's original series

== Discography ==
Year	Title	Band/Solo	Co-singer	Lyrics
2012	Tokari	Coke Studio @ MTV Season 2	Papon	
2022	Ghalib	Single		Sugandha Garg
2022	Sawal	Single		Sugandha Garg
2023	Mazzaak	Single		Sugandha Garg
