= Abhishek Sharma (director) =

Indian filmmaker (born 1987)

- Occupation: Film director
- Years active: 2010–present

Abhishek Sharma is an Indian film director and writer known for his works in Hindi films. He has directed comedy films like Tere Bin Laden (2010), its sequel Tere Bin Laden: Dead or Alive (2016) and The Shaukeens (2014). His film Parmanu: The Story of Pokhran (2018) is based on the nuclear tests named Pokhran-II.

== Filmography ==
| Year | Film | Director | Writer | Ref |
|---|---|---|---|---|
| 2010 | Tere Bin Laden | Yes | Yes | |
| 2014 | The Shaukeens | Yes | | |
| 2016 | Tere Bin Laden: Dead or Alive | Yes | Yes | |
| 2018 | Parmanu: The Story of Pokhran | Yes | Yes | |
| 2019 | The Zoya Factor | Yes | | |
| 2020 | Suraj Pe Mangal Bhari | Yes | Yes | |
| 2022 | Ram Setu | Yes | Yes | |
| 2023 | Kashni | Yes | | |
