= Kareena Kapoor filmography =

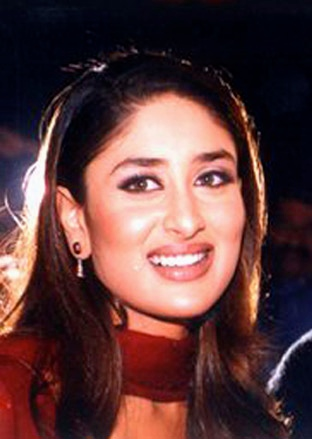
Kapoor Khan in 2001

Kareena Kapoor is an Indian actress who has appeared in over 60 Hindi films. She made her acting debut opposite Abhishek Bachchan in the 2000 drama Refugee, for which she won the Filmfare Award for Best Female Debut. The following year, she appeared in five films, including the romance Mujhe Kucch Kehna Hai, the thriller Ajnabee, and the ensemble melodrama Kabhi Khushi Kabhie Gham. The latter emerged as the highest-grossing Bollywood film in overseas to that point, and the success of these films established her in Bollywood. This success was followed by repetitive roles in a series of commercial failures.

In 2004, Kapoor portrayed a prostitute in the drama Chameli, which proved to be a turning point in her career, earning her a Filmfare Special Award. That same year, she played a Muslim woman affected by the 2002 Gujarat riots in Govind Nihalani's political drama Dev, and two years later, she played the Desdemona character in Omkara (2006), an adaptation of William Shakespeare's tragedy Othello from director Vishal Bhardwaj. She won two Filmfare Critics Award for Best Actress for these films. In 2007, Kapoor played a loquacious Sikh girl in Jab We Met, a commercially successful romantic comedy co-starring Shahid Kapoor, for which she won the Filmfare Award for Best Actress.

Kapoor co-starred with Aamir Khan in Rajkumar Hirani's comedy-drama 3 Idiots (2009), which emerged as the highest-grossing Indian film to that point. She won the Filmfare Award for Best Supporting Actress for her role in the family drama We Are Family and played a tomboy in the lucrative comedy Golmaal 3 (both 2010). In 2011, she played the leading lady in the top-grossing action films Bodyguard and Ra.One. Among her four releases in 2012, she received praise for playing a free-spirited woman in Ek Main Aur Ekk Tu, a troubled actress in Heroine and a prostitute in Talaash: The Answer Lies Within. In the next few years, she (now Kapoor Khan) decreased her workload, taking on smaller parts of the love-interest in the androcentric films Singham Returns (2014) and Bajrangi Bhaijaan (2015); the latter ranks among Indian cinema's highest earners. This changed in 2016 when she starred in two commercial successes, the satire Ki & Ka and the acclaimed drama Udta Punjab. Further success came with the ensemble comedies Veere Di Wedding (2018) and Good Newwz (2019). After reuniting with Aamir Khan in the commercially failed drama Laal Singh Chaddha (2022), Kapoor Khan had her first streaming film release in the thriller Jaane Jaan (2023). The same year, she appeared in another thriller, a Hansal Mehta directorial, The Buckingham Murders, wherein she played a grieving mother and a British-Indian detective. In 2024, she had another female-led commercial success in the comedy Crew. She, then, appeared in Rohit Shetty's Singham Again, an installment in the Cop Universe. She subsequently appeared in Meghna Gulzar's crime investigative drama, Daayra.

== Films ==
Key
| † | Denotes productions that have not yet been released |

| Year | Title | Role | Notes | Ref(s) |
|---|---|---|---|---|
| 2000 | Refugee | Nazneen "Naaz" Ahmed | | |
| 2001 | Mujhe Kucch Kehna Hai | Pooja Saxena | | |
| 2001 | Yaadein | Isha Singh Puri | | |
| 2001 | Ajnabee | Priya Malhotra | | |
| 2001 | Aśoka | Kaurwaki | | |
| 2001 | Kabhi Khushi Kabhie Gham | Pooja Sharma | | |
| 2002 | Mujhse Dosti Karoge! | Tina Kapoor | | |
| 2002 | Jeena Sirf Merre Liye | Pooja Khanna (Pinky) (Note: Kapoor played a single character who has two different names.) | | |
| 2003 | Talaash: The Hunt Begins... | Tina Saluja | | |
| 2003 | Khushi | Khushi Singh (Laali) | | |
| 2003 | Main Prem Ki Diwani Hoon | Sanjana Satyaprakash | | |
| 2003 | LOC Kargil | Simran | | |
| 2004 | Chameli | Chameli | | |
| 2004 | Yuva | Mira | | |
| 2004 | Dev | Aaliya | Also playback singer for "Jab Nahin Aaye The Tum" | |
| 2004 | Fida | Neha Mehra | Also playback singer for "Aaja Ve Mahi" | |
| 2004 | Aitraaz | Priya Saxena | | |
| 2004 | Hulchul | Anjali Pathak | | |
| 2005 | Bewafaa | Anjali Verma Sahai | | |
| 2005 | Kyon Ki | Dr. Tanvi Khurana | | |
| 2005 | Dosti: Friends Forever | Anjali Saluja | | |
| 2006 | 36 China Town | Priya Singhania | | |
| 2006 | Chup Chup Ke | Shruti Chauhan | | |
| 2006 | Omkara | Dolly Mishra | | |
| 2006 | Don | Kamini | Special appearance | |
| 2007 | Kya Love Story Hai | Herself | Special appearance in the song "It's Rocking" | |
| 2007 | Jab We Met | Geet Dhillon | | |
| 2007 | Om Shanti Om | Herself | Uncredited walk-past cameo | |
| 2008 | Halla Bol | Herself | Cameo appearance | |
| 2008 | Tashan | Pooja Singh | Also playback singer for "Pooja Ka Tashan" | |
| 2008 | Roadside Romeo | Laila | Animated feature film Voice only | |
| 2008 | Golmaal Returns | Ekta Gill Santoshi | | |
| 2009 | Luck by Chance | Herself | Cameo appearance | |
| 2009 | Billu | Herself | Special appearance in the song "Marjaani" | |
| 2009 | Kambakkht Ishq | Simrita Rai | | |
| 2009 | Main Aurr Mrs Khanna | Raina Khanna | | |
| 2009 | Kurbaan | Avantika Ahuja | | |
| 2009 | 3 Idiots | Pia Sahastrabuddhe | | |
| 2010 | Milenge Milenge | Priya Kapoor | | |
| 2010 | We Are Family | Shreya Arora | | |
| 2010 | Golmaal 3 | Divya | | |
| 2011 | Bodyguard | Divya Rana/ Chhaya | | |
| 2011 | Ra.One | Sonia Subramaniam | | |
| 2012 | Ek Main Aur Ekk Tu | Riana Braganza | | |
| 2012 | Agent Vinod | Iram Parveen Bilal/ Dr. Ruby Mendes | | |
| 2012 | Rowdy Rathore | Unnamed | Special appearance in song "Chinta Ta" | |
| 2012 | Heroine | Mahi Arora | | |
| 2012 | Talaash: The Answer Lies Within | Rosie/Simran | | |
| 2012 | Dabangg 2 | Item Dancer | Special appearance in the song "Fevicol Se" | |
| 2013 | Bombay Talkies | Herself | Special appearance in song "Apna Bombay Talkies" | |
| 2013 | Satyagraha | Yasmin Ahmed | | |
| 2013 | Gori Tere Pyaar Mein! | Dia Sharma | | |
| 2014 | Singham Returns | Avni Kamat | | |
| 2014 | The Shaukeens | | Cameo appearance | |
| 2014 | Happy Ending | Herself | Cameo appearance | |
| 2015 | Gabbar Is Back | Sunaina | Special appearance | |
| 2015 | Bajrangi Bhaijaan | Rasika Pandey | | |
| 2015 | Brothers | Mary | Special appearance in the song "Mera Naam Mary Hai" | |
| 2016 | Ki & Ka | Kia Sahni Bansal | | |
| 2016 | Udta Punjab | Dr. Preet Sahni | | |
| 2018 | Veere Di Wedding | Kalindi Puri | | |
| 2019 | Good Newwz | Deepti Batra | | |
| 2020 | Angrezi Medium | Naina Kohli | | |
| 2022 | Laal Singh Chaddha | Rupa D'Souza | | |
| 2023 | Jaane Jaan | Maya D'Souza | | |
| 2023 | The Buckingham Murders | Jasmeet Bhamra | Also producer | |
| 2024 | Crew | Jasmine Kohli | | |
| 2024 | Singham Again | Avni Kamat Singham | | |
| 2025 | Dining With The Kapoors | Herself | Documentary film | |
| 2026 | Daayra | Ajooni Kohli | | |
| 2026 | King † | TBA | Special appearance in a song | |

== Documentary ==
| Year | Title | Role | Notes | Ref. |
|---|---|---|---|---|
| 2000 | Bollywood im Alpenrausch | Herself | Uncredited role | |
| 2013 | The Indian Food Wisdom and The Art of Eating Right | Herself | | |
| 2015 | Bollywood And Beyond: A Century Of Indian Cinema | Herself | | |
| 2015 | Girl Rising India – Woh Padhegi, Woh Udegi | Herself | | |

== Television ==
| Year | Title | Role | Notes | Ref. |
|---|---|---|---|---|
| 2012 | Taarak Mehta Ka Ooltah Chashmah | Herself | | |
| 2012 | Punar Vivah | Mahi Arora | Episode 154 | |
| 2012 | C.I.D. | Herself | Episode "Heroine Ka Khatra" | |
| 2018 | Naagin 3 | Kaalindi | Special appearance | |
| 2019 | Dance India Dance: Battle of the Champions | Judge | | |
| 2022 | Spy Bahu | Narrator | For first episode and trailers | |

== See also ==
- Awards and nominations received by Kareena Kapoor

== Bibliography ==
- Edgar, Thorpe. The Pearson Current Events Digest 2009. Pearson Education India. ISBN 978-81-317-2723-2.
- Burnett, Mark Thornton (2013). Shakespeare and World Cinema. Cambridge University Press. ISBN 978-1-107-00331-6.
- Gopal, Sangita (26 January 2012). Conjugations: Marriage and Form in New Bollywood Cinema. University of Chicago Press. ISBN 978-0-2263-042-74.
- Rishi, Tilak (2012). Bless You Bollywood!: A Tribute to Hindi Cinema on Completing 100 Years. Trafford Publishing. ISBN 978-1-4669-3963-9.
