= List of awards and nominations received by Kareena Kapoor =

Kareena Kapoor awards and nominations
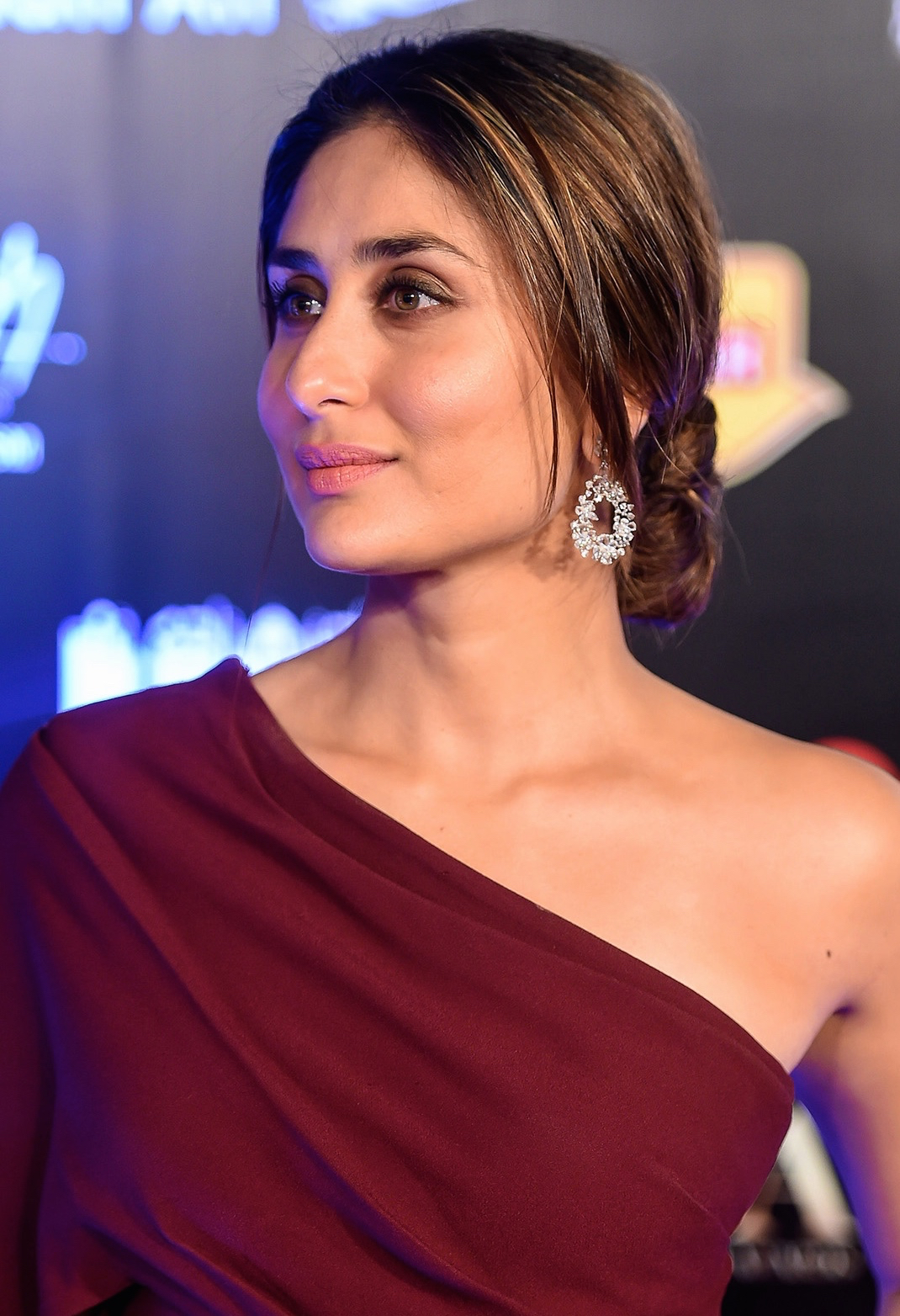
- Kapoor at the TOIFA Awards in 2016
Awards and nominations
Award	Wins	Nominations
Apsara Film & Television Producers Guild Award	1	4
Bollywood Movie Awards	2	6
Filmfare Awards	7	13
GIFA Awards	0	2
IIFA Awards	4	12
Screen Awards	3	19
Stardust Awards	6	26
Zee Cine Awards	3	10
BIG Star Entertainment Awards	3	8
Lux Golden Rose Awards	4	4
Sansui Viewer's Choice Awards	2	3
Other awards	23	1

Totals (Note: Certain award groups do not simply award one winner. They acknowledge several different recipients, have runners-up, and have third place. Since this is a specific recognition and is different from losing an award, runner-up mentions are considered wins in this award tally. For simplification and to avoid errors, each award in this list has been presumed to have had a prior nomination.)
- Wins: 69
- Nominations: 133

Kareena Kapoor is an Indian actress who appears predominantly in Hindi films. Kapoor is the recipient of many industry awards and nominations. She has received the Best Female Debut at the 46th Filmfare Awards for her performance in the J. P. Dutta's 2000 romantic drama film Refugee. She received three Best Debut awards at the Bollywood Movie, International Indian Film Academy Awards and Sansui ceremonies and the Lux Face of the Year award at the Zee Cine Awards respectively.

The following year, she featured in the critically acclaimed drama Asoka for which she received a nomination for the Filmfare Award for Best Actress and appeared in a supporting role of Karan Johar's family drama Kabhi Khushi Kabhie Gham with Shah Rukh Khan, Kajol, Amitabh Bachchan, Hrithik Roshan and Jaya Bachchan (one of the biggest commercial successes to date of that time), which earned her a nomination for the Filmfare Award for Best Supporting Actress.

After negative reviews for a series of roles, Kapoor was noted for her performance in Sudhir Mishra's Chameli (2004). Her portrayal of a sex worker in the film won her jury recognition at several award ceremonies, including Stardust and Filmfare. After Chameli, Kapoor featured in the critically acclaimed Dev (2004) and Omkara (2006), both of which earned her multiple nominations at various award ceremonies. In 2007, she received high critical acclaim and several awards for her performance in the romantic comedy Jab We Met, including her first Filmfare Award for Best Actress. In 2009, she again received high critical acclaim for her performances in the terrorism thriller Kurbaan (2009) and the Aamir Khan-starrer and Rajkumar Hirani-directed 3 Idiots (2009). For her work in both the films, Kapoor won the Screen Award for Best Actress (Popular Choice) and IIFA Award for Best Actress for her performance in 3 Idiots. In 2011, she received the Filmfare Award for Best Supporting Actress for her performance in the family drama We Are Family (2010). She also won her first ever Filmfare OTT Award for best Actress for her performance in the movie Jaane Jaan (2023).

Kapoor has also been recognized at major Indian film and fashion award functions, including a Zee Cine Award Queen of Hearts in 2002 and an IIFA Award for Style Diva of the Year in 2004. That year she was also recognized for Celebrity Style (Female) at the Bollywood Fashion Awards, and two years later received the Most Glamorous Actress of the Year award at the Tuscan Verve Zoom Glam Awards. In 2009, Kapoor was among five actresses nominated for Star of the Decade – Female at the 10th annual IIFA Awards. Kapoor has also received achievement awards from a number of organizations; in 2009 she received Rotary International's Vocational Excellence Award for her film achievements at an early age, and the India Today Woman Award for her contributions to art and cinema.

== Apsara Film & Television Producers Guild Awards ==
The Apsara Film & Television Producers Guild Award is presented by the Bollywood film industry to honour and recognize the professional excellence of their peers. Kapoor has received one award out of four nominations.

Year	Nominated work	Award	Result
2008	Jab We Met	Best Actress in a Leading Role	Won
2010	Kurbaan	Best Actress in a Leading Role	Nominated
2011	Golmaal 3	Best Actress in a Leading Role	Nominated
2013	Heroine	Best Actress in a Leading Role	Nominated

== BIG Star Entertainment Awards ==
The BIG Star Entertainment Awards honour the Hindi film industry; Kapoor has won three awards out of Seven nominations.

Year	Nominated work	Award	Result
2010		Film Actor (Female) of the Decade	Nominated
2010	Golmaal 3	Most Entertaining Film Actor – Female	Nominated
2011	Bodyguard	Most Entertaining Film Actor – Female	Nominated
2011	Bodyguard	Most Entertaining Actor in a Romantic Role – Female	Won
2011	Bodyguard	Most Entertaining Pair of the Year (along with Salman Khan)	Won
2012	Talaash	Most Entertaining Film Actor – Female	Nominated
2012	Talaash	Most Entertaining Actor in a Thriller – Female	Won
2013	Satyagraha	Most Entertaining Actor in a Social Drama Film – Female	Nominated
2017	Ki & Ka	Most Entertaining Actor in a Romantic Film – Female	Nominated

== Filmfare Awards ==
The Filmfare Awards is one of the oldest and most prominent Hindi film award ceremony. They are presented annually by The Times Group to honour both artistic and technical excellence. Kapoor has won six awards out of thirteen nominations, including a special award for her performance in Chameli (2004).

Year	Nominated work	Award	Result
2001	Refugee	Best Female Debut	Won
2002	Asoka	Best Actress	Nominated
2002	Kabhi Khushi Kabhie Gham	Best Supporting Actress	Nominated
2004	Chameli	Special Award	Won
2005	Dev	Best Actress (Critics)	Won
2007	Omkara	Best Actress (Critics)	Won
2007	Omkara	Best Actress	Nominated
2008	Jab We Met	Best Actress	Won
2010	Kurbaan	Best Actress	Nominated
2010	3 Idiots	Best Actress	Nominated
2011	Golmaal 3	Best Actress	Nominated
2011	We Are Family	Best Supporting Actress	Won
2013	Heroine	Best Actress	Nominated
2017	Udta Punjab	Best Supporting Actress	Nominated
2020	Good Newwz	Best Actress	Nominated
2023	Laal Singh Chaddha	Best Actress	Nominated
2025	Crew	Best Actress	Nominated
2025	The Buckingham Murders	Best Actress (Critics)	Nominated

== Global Indian Film Awards ==
The Global Indian Film Awards honoured the Hindi film industry from 2005 to 2007; Kapoor received two nominations.

Year	Nominated work	Award	Result
2005	Dev	Best Actress	Nominated
2007	Omkara	Best Actress	Nominated

== GQ Men of the Year Awards (India) ==
GQ India gives away a number of Awards in various fields. One popular award is the GQ Men of the year award. Kapoor received one award.

Year	Nominated work	Award	Result
2009	GQ Men of the Year Awards (India)	Excellence of the Year	Won

== HELLO! Hall of Fame Awards ==
Year	Nominated work	Award	Result
2010	—N/a	Entertainer of the Year (Female)	Won
2014	—N/a	Glamour Icon of the Year	Won

== International Indian Film Academy Awards ==
The International Indian Film Academy Awards are presented annually to honour the artistic and technical excellence of professionals in Bollywood (the Hindi language film industry). Kapoor has won four awards out of nine nominations, including a nomination for Star of the Decade – Female.

Year	Nominated work	Award	Result
2001	Refugee	Star Debut of the Year – Female	Won
2002	Kabhi Khushi Kabhie Gham	Best Supporting Actress	Nominated
2003	Mujhse Dosti Karoge!	Best Supporting Actress	Nominated
2004	Kareena Kapoor	Style Diva of the Year	Won
2005	Aitraaz	Best Actress	Nominated
2007	Omkara	Best Actress	Nominated
2008	Jab We Met	Best Actress	Won
2009	Kareena Kapoor	Star of the Decade – Female	Nominated
2010	3 Idiots	Best Actress	Won
2011	Golmaal 3	Best Actress	Nominated
2012	Bodyguard	Best Actress	Nominated
2013	Heroine	Best Actress	Nominated
2020	Good Newwz	Best Actress	Nominated

== Lux Golden Rose Awards ==
Year	Nominated work	Award	Result
2016	Ki & Ka	Glamorous Diva of the Year	Won
2016	Udta Punjab	Best Supporting Actress	Nominated
2017	—N/a	I Am More Than You Can See Award	Won
2018	Veere Di Wedding	Confident Beauty of the Year	Won

== Lokmot Maharashtra's Most Stylish Awards ==
• 2018 : Power Celebrity of the Year

== Screen Awards ==
The Screen Awards are associated with the executive director and the governor of the Academy of Motion Picture Arts and Sciences. They are presented annually to honour professional excellence in the Hindi-language film industry. Kapoor has won three awards out of thirteen nominations, including five Jodi nominations (with Hrithik Roshan in 2002, Shahid Kapoor in 2005, 2008 and 2010, and Saif Ali Khan in 2010).

Year	Nominated work	Award	Result
2001	Refugee	Most Promising Newcomer – Female	Nominated
2002	Kabhi Khushi Kabhie Gham	Jodi No. 1 (along with Hrithik Roshan)	Nominated
2002	Kabhi Khushi Kabhie Gham	Best Supporting Actress	Nominated
2005	Yuva	Best Supporting Actress	Nominated
2005	Dev	Best Actress	Nominated
2005	Fida	Jodi No. 1 (along with Shahid Kapoor)	Nominated
2007	Omkara	Best Actress	Won
2008	Jab We Met	Best Actress	Won
2008	Jab We Met	Jodi No. 1 (along with Shahid Kapoor)	Nominated
2010	3 Idiots	Best Actress	Nominated
2010	Kurbaan & 3 Idiots	Best Actress (Popular Choice)	Won
2010	Kareena Kapoor	Jodi of the Decade (along with Saif Ali Khan)	Nominated
2010	Kareena Kapoor	Jodi of the Decade (along with Shahid Kapoor)	Nominated
2011	Golmaal 3	Best Actress (Popular Choice)	Nominated
2012	Bodyguard & Ra.One	Best Actress (Popular Choice)	Nominated
2013	Heroine	Best Actress	Nominated
2013	Ek Main Aur Ekk Tu & Talaash	Best Actress (Popular Choice)	Nominated
2015	Singham Returns	Best Actress (Popular Choice)	Nominated
2016	Bajrangi Bhaijaan	Best Actress (Popular Choice)	Nominated

== Stardust Awards ==
The Stardust Awards are presented annually by Stardust magazine; Kapoor has won seven awards out of eighteen nominations.

Year	Nominated work	Award	Result
2004	Chameli	Special Jury Award	Won
2004	Main Prem Ki Diwani Hoon	Star of the Year – Female	Nominated
2005	Dev	Star of the Year – Female	Nominated
2006	Kyon Ki	Star of the Year – Female	Nominated
2007	Omkara	Star of the Year – Female	Nominated
2007	Omkara	Performer of the Year – Female	Won
2008	Jab We Met	Star of the Year – Female	Won
2009	Golmaal Returns	Star of the Year – Female	Nominated
2009	Kareena Kapoor	Style Icon of the Year – Female	Won
2010	Kurbaan	Star of the Year – Female	Won
2010	3 Idiots	Star of the Year – Female	Nominated
2010	3 Idiots	Performer of the Year – Female	Won
2011	We Are Family	Best Actress – Drama	Nominated
2011	Golmaal 3	Best Actress – Comedy / Romance	Nominated
2011	Golmaal 3	Star of the Year – Female	Nominated
2012	Bodyguard	Star of the Year – Female	Nominated
2012	Bodyguard	Best Actress – Drama	Nominated
2012	Ra.One	Best Actress – Thriller / Action	Nominated
2012	Ra.One	Star of the Year – Female	Nominated
2013	Heroine	Star of the Year – Female	Nominated
2013	Heroine	Best Actress – Drama	Nominated
2013	Talaash	Performer of the Year – Female	Won
2013	Talaash	Star of the Year – Female	Nominated
2014	Singham Returns	Star of the Year – Female	Nominated
2015	Bajrangi Bhaijaan	Star of the Year – Female	Nominated
2016	Udta Punjab	Best Supporting Actress	Nominated

== Zee Cine Awards ==
The Zee Cine Awards honour the Hindi film industry; kapoor has won three awards out of eight nominations.

Year	Nominated work	Award	Result
2001	Refugee	Best Female Debut	Nominated
2001	Refugee	Lux Face of the Year	Won
2002	Kareena Kapoor	Queen of Hearts	Won
2005	Dev	Best Actor – Female	Nominated
2007	Omkara	Best Actor – Female	Nominated
2008	Jab We Met	Best Actor – Female	Won
2011	Golmaal 3	Best Actor – Female	Nominated
2011	We are Family	Best Actor in a Supporting Role – Female	Nominated
2012	Kareena Kapoor	International Icon – Female	Nominated
2012	Bodyguard	Best Actor – Female	Nominated
2013	Talaash	Best Actor – Female	Nominated
2017	Udta Punjab	Best Actor in a Supporting Role – Female	Nominated
2019	Veere Di Wedding	Best Actor – Female	Nominated
2020	Good Newwz	Best Actor – Female	Nominated

== Other awards and recognitions ==
Year	Award	Category	Film	Result
2001	Bollywood Movie Awards	Best Female Debut	Refugee	Won
2004	Bollywood Movie Awards	Best Actress (Critics)	Chameli	Won
2013	NDTV Indian of the Year Awards	Entertainer of the Decade Award		Won

== Other achievements ==
- 2004 Honoured by Marco Ricci Society with Young Achiever Award
- 2005 Honoured with Rajiv Gandhi Young Achiever Award,
- 2005 Awarded as Indian Diva by Sahara One Television viewers.
- 2006 Awarded the Smita Patil Memorial Award for her Contributions to the Hindi Film Industry,
- 2008 Awarded with Global Achievement Award at Future Group Global Indian TV Honours.
- 2009 Awarded India Today Woman Award for her contributions to art and cinema, in 2009
- 2009 IIFA-FICCI Frames' as the Most Powerful Entertainers of the Decade award
- 2009 GQ Excellence Award for Achievement in films.
- 2009 Awarded Celebrity Endorsement of the Year Award by Tech Life Awards
- 2018 Award of excellence in leading actress at Accolades competition.
- 2018 Asian icon of the year award at Masala awards.
- 2020 Beauty of the year at Vogue beauty awards.
- 2020 Most awaited social media debut at Bollywood life awards.
- 2021 Digital movies and talent award at Talent Track awards.
- 2022 Social media queen award at Bollywood life awards.
