= Shiney Ahuja =

Indian film actor and model (born 1973)

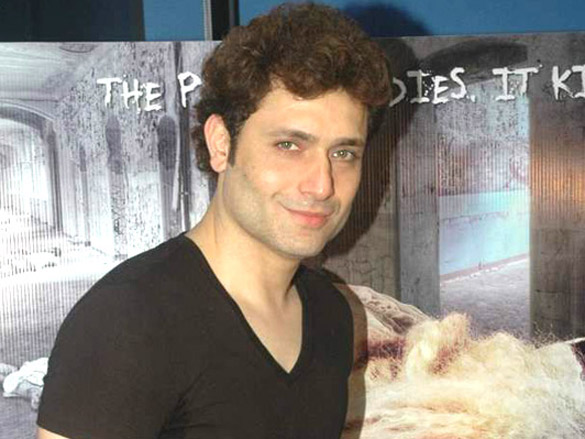
- Born: 15 May 1973 (age 53)
- Other name: Shiney Suraj Ahuja
- Education: St. Xavier's School, Delhi; Army Public School, Dhaula Kuan; Hansraj College; R.V. College
- Occupations: Actor; Model
- Years active: 2005–2015
- Spouse: Anupam Pandey (m. 1997)
- Children: 1

Shiney Suraj Ahuja (born 15 May 1973) is an Indian former actor who worked in Hindi films. He won the Filmfare Best Male Debut Award for Hazaaron Khwaishein Aisi in 2006 and then followed with several hit films like Gangster, Woh Lamhe, Life in a Metro, Bhool Bhulaiyaa, and Welcome Back.

== Early life and education ==
Ahuja was born on 15 May 1973 into a Punjabi family. As per Ahuja, his mother is from Shimla, with her family originally from Sargoda, and his father Suraj Ahuja's ancestry is from Sahiwal, both in modern day Pakistan. His father was born in Dehradun, and was a colonel in the Indian Army.

Ahuja studied at St. Xavier's Senior Secondary School, Delhi and Army Public School, Dhaula Kuan, before attending Hansraj College of the University of Delhi, followed by R.V. College of Engineering in Bangalore. Later, he joined the theatre group "TAG" where he met Barry John. Shortly thereafter, he joined John's acting school in Delhi.

== Career ==
After completing college, Ahuja featured in commercials for Pepsi, Cadburys, and Citibank. He also featured in the music video 'Pyar Ho Gaya' for the British-Asian band "Stereo Nation".

Sudhir Mishra, the director of Hazaaron Khwaishein Aisi, saw Shiney in the Pepsi commercial and called him to audition for Kay Kay Menon's character – Sidharth Tyabji. Upon his request, Mishra also auditioned him for the role of Vikram Malhotra. He was selected from over 200 aspirants for the role of Vikram Malhotra and made his acting debut in the film. The film went on to win critical acclaim, and was screened at as many as 12 film festivals over 6 months. These included film festivals at Turkey, Estonia, River to River (Florence), Berlin, Edinburgh, Washington, Dallas, India (Goa), Bite The Mango festival (Bradford, UK), the Commonwealth festival (Manchester), and the Pacific Rim festival (California). The film was released commercially in 2005 with minimal publicity but a national footprint across India. He received several Best Actor for Male Debut awards given for the year including the Filmfare Award for Best Male Debut, Zee Cine Award for Best Male Debut, and Stardust Award for Breakthrough Performance.

Thereafter, Ahuja played the lead role in Mahesh Bhatt's Gangster, a popular commercial movie genre and Woh Lamhe opposite Kangana Ranaut. Other films followed including Life in a Metro, Bhool Bhulaiyaa. Two of his films, Ek Accident with co-star Soha Ali Khan and Har Pal with Preity Zinta are yet to be released.

In 2015, Ahuja was cast in Anees Bazmee's Welcome Back co-starring John Abraham, Shruti Hassan, Anil Kapoor, Nana Patekar, Naseeruddin Shah, Dimple Kapadia and Paresh Rawal.

As of 2025, Welcome Back was his last released movie, and he was said to be living in the Philippines, working as a garment shop owner.

== Personal life ==
Ahuja is married to Anupam Pande, and they have a daughter Arshiya.

== Legal issues ==
In June 2009, Ahuja was arrested on charges of raping, detaining, and threatening his 19-year-old domestic servant. He was booked under Section 376 (rape), and Section 506 (threat to kill) of the Indian Penal Code. During the trial, his maid (the victim) recanted on her testimony and told the Court that she was never raped. However, the judge believed that the maid falsely testified under pressure and, in 2011, Ahuja was sentenced to seven years of prison.

This case was the inspiration for the writing of the legal drama film Section 375. The film was written by Manish Gupta, his friend who had interacted with the parties of the case during the time of the arrest.

== Filmography ==
Year	Title	Role	Notes	Ref.
2005	Hazaaron Khwaishein Aisi	Vikram Malhotra	Filmfare Award for Best Male Debut	
2005	Karam	ACP Wagh Pratap Singh		
2005	Sins	William	English-language movie	
2005	Kal: Yesterday and Tomorrow	Tarun Haskar		
2006	Gangster	Daya Shankar	Stardust Award for Superstar of Tomorrow – Male	
2006	Fanaa	Suraj Ahuja	Special appearance	
2006	Woh Lamhe	Aditya Garewal		
2006	Zindaggi Rocks	Dr. Suraj Rihan		
2007	Life in a... Metro	Akash		
2007	Bhool Bhulaiyaa	Siddharth Chaturvedi		
2007	Khoya Khoya Chand	Zaffar		
2008	Migration	Birju	Short film	
2008	Hijack	Vikram Madaan		
2009	Dheeme Dheeme	Himself	Special appearance	
2012	Ghost	Vijay Singh		
2015	Welcome Back	Honey Sharif		

== Awards ==
Award	Film	Category	Result
Filmfare Awards	Hazaaron Khwaishein Aisi	Best Male Debut	Won
Screen Awards	Hazaaron Khwaishein Aisi	Best Male Debut	Won
Zee Cine Awards	Hazaaron Khwaishein Aisi	Best Male Debut	Won
IIFA Awards	Hazaaron Khwaishein Aisi	Star Debut of the Year - Male	Won
Stardust Awards	Hazaaron Khwaishein Aisi	Best Male Debut	Won
Stardust Awards	Gangster	Superstar of Tomorrow	Won
