= Dheeme Dheeme =

- Directed by: Kumar Sahni
- Written by: Anil Pandey
- Produced by: Pritish Nandy
- Starring: Shiney Ahuja; Priyanka Sharma
- Music by: Anu Malik
- Release date: 2009
- Country: India
- Language: Hindi

Dheeme Dheeme is a 2009 Bollywood film starring Shiney Ahuja, Priyanka Sharma. It is directed by Kumar Sahni and produced by Pritish Nandy.

== Cast ==
- Shiney Ahuja as Himself
- Priyanka Sharma as Herself
