= Har Pal =

- Official poster
- Directed by: Jahnu Barua
- Written by: Jahnu Barua; Honey Irani
- Produced by: Tito
- Starring: Preity Zinta; Shiney Ahuja; Dharmendra; Isha Koppikar
- Edited by: Deepa Bhatia
- Music by: Pritam Chakraborty
- Distributed by: Navjeevan Films
- Country: India
- Language: Hindi

Har Pal (English: Every Moment) is an unreleased Indian film directed by Jahnu Barua. The film stars Preity Zinta, Shiney Ahuja and Isha Koppikar in leading roles. Dharmendra appears in a supporting role as Zinta's father. The film relates the love story between two neighbours, played by Zinta and Ahuja, who are paired together on-screen for the first time.

== Production ==
Preity Zinta and Shiney Ahuja were Jahnu Barua's first choices for the leading roles. Initially, Dipannita Sharma was supposed to play the supporting role of Zinta's roommate, but was later replaced by Isha Koppikar. Amitabh Bachchan was also supposed to make a role in the film as Zinta's father, but he later opted out due to date problems. Bachchan was subsequently replaced by Dharmendra, after Zinta, who was looking for an opportunity to work with him, had suggested his name. Dino Morea makes a special appearance in a song composed by Pritam Chakraborty.

Filming began in August 2007 in Mumbai, and took place in Kolkata and Shillong, Meghalaya. The film's release was delayed for several years following rape charges which were brought on male lead Shiney Ahuja and which might have dampened the film's commercial prospects. In November 2010, it was announced that the film would come out in December of that year. However, on 25 November 2014, Barua announced that the film's production had been halted with no plans to release the film.

== Cast ==
- Preity Zinta as Runa Kasturia
- Shiney Ahuja as Rohit Bajaja
- Isha Koppikar as Shweta Mohile
- Lillete Dubey as
- Dharmendra as Baba
- Dino Morea as Ambi (Special appearance)
- Jai Kalra
