= Pritish Nandy =

Indian politician and poet (1951–2025)

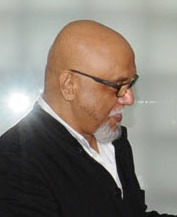
- Nandy at the 41st International Film Festival of India in 2010
- Born: 15 January 1951; Bhagalpur, Bihar, India
- Died: 8 January 2025 (aged 73); Mumbai, Maharashtra, India
- Occupations: Poet; painter; journalist; politician; animal activist
- Works: Calcutta If You Must Exile Me
- Children: 3; including Kushan
- Relatives: Ashis Nandy (brother) and Manish Nandy (brother)
- Awards: Padma Shri

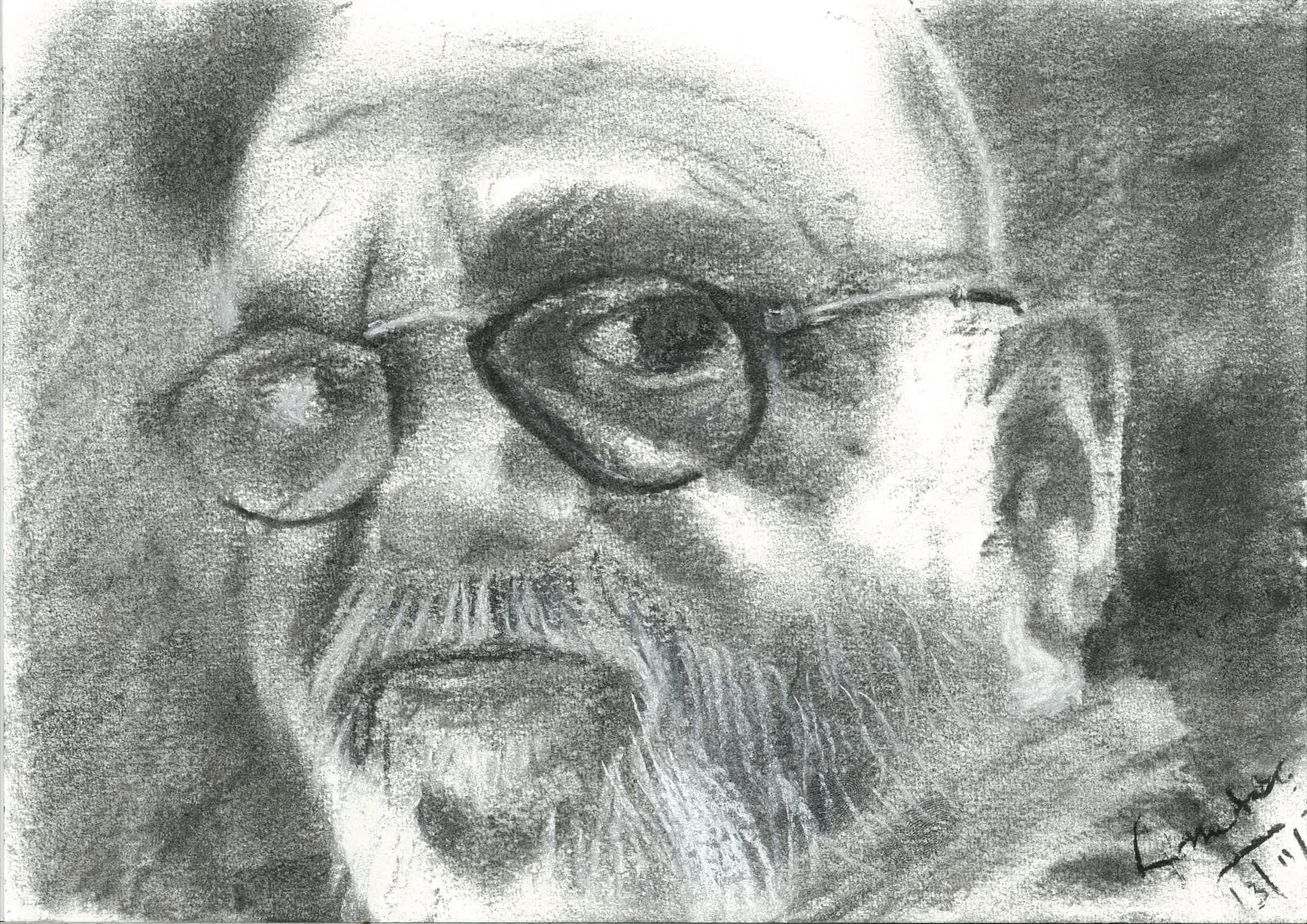
Charcoal on Paper by Amitabh Mitra Pritish Nandy, Indo- English Poet, Visual Artist and Parliamentarian

Pritish Nandy (15 January 1951 – 8 January 2025) was an Indian poet, painter, journalist, politician, media and television personality, animal activist and maker of films, television and streaming content. He was a parliamentarian in the Rajya Sabha from Maharashtra, elected on a ticket from the Shiv Sena. He authored forty books of poetry in English and translated poems by other writers from Bengali, Urdu and Punjabi into English as well as a new version of the Isha Upanishad. Apart from these, he authored books of stories and non fiction as well as three books of translations of classical love poetry from Sanskrit. He was the Publishing Director of The Times of India Group between 1982 and 1991, and also served as editor for The Illustrated Weekly of India, The Independent, and Filmfare. He held six exhibitions of his paintings and calligraphy. He founded Pritish Nandy Communications Ltd, the content company, in 1993. He also founded People for Animals, India's first animal rights NGO with Maneka Gandhi.

== Background ==
Pritish Nandy was born in Bhagalpur in the state of Bihar in eastern India to a Bengali family, self-identifying as an agnostic. He was the son of Satish Chandra Nandy and Prafulla Nalini Nandy, and brother of Ashis Nandy and Manish Nandy. He had three children with his wife Rina Pritish Nandy. His daughters Rangita Nandy (born 1978) and Ishita Pritish-Nandy (born 1980) are film producers, creators and show runners and his son Kushan Nandy (born 1972) is a film producer, writer and director. Pritish Nandy was educated at La Martiniere College and, briefly, at Presidency College in Kolkata, where he spent the first 28 years of his life. Nandy's mother was a teacher at La Martiniere Calcutta and subsequently became the school's first Indian vice principal. Nandy died at his Mumbai home, on 8 January 2025, at the age of 73.

== Literary career ==
Pritish Nandy's first book of poems Of Gods and Olives was published in 1967. Three further volumes followed in the 1960s and a further 14 volumes were published in the 1970s. During the seventies Nandy edited and published a poetry magazine called Dialogue which published many of India's finest poets in English and other languages, in translation. Dialogue also published over forty books of poems, of first time poets as well as famous poets. It became an iconic platform for contemporary Indian poetry, in English and in translation. In July 1981 Nandy was nominated as a Poet Laureate by the World Academy of Arts and Culture at the Fifth World Congress of Poets in San Francisco. Nandy's poem Calcutta If You Must Exile Me is considered a pioneering classic in modern Indian literature.

The Government of India conferred on him the Padma Shri in 1977 for his contribution to Indian literature. He wrote a new book of poems called “Again” in 2010 after a long hiatus and then, “Stuck on 1/Forty" in 2012. In 2014, his version of the Isha Upanishad was published.

== Journalistic career ==
He was the publishing director of The Times of India between 1982 and 1991. He was also managing editor of the group and editor and publisher of The Illustrated Weekly of India during its most successful decade. He was also editor and publisher of ‘’The Independent’’, a newspaper launched by the same group and ‘’Filmfare’’ the popular magazine.

Nandy left The Times of India group to start his own media company Pritish Nandy Communications which was founded in 1993. He was chairman of Pritish Nandy Communications Ltd, popularly known as PNC and well known for its films, TV shows, and streaming content.

He was also a columnist with The Times of India, Dainik Bhaskar, Divya Bhaskar and Sangbad Pratidin. His regular column appeared in ‘’Mumbai Mirror’’ and his blog on Times Online. Nandy was one of the first internet evangelists in India and opened India's first cyber café in 1996 at Hotel Leela Kempinski in Mumbai.

== Political career ==
Pritish Nandy was elected to the Rajya Sabha representing Maharashtra, the upper house of the Indian parliament, in July 1998. He was elected on a Shiv Sena ticket. He was a member of parliament for six years and was on a number of committees including the National Committee to Celebrate 50 years of Independence, the Parliamentary Committee for Defence, the Parliamentary Committee for Communications, the Parliamentary Committee for Foreign Affairs.

Nandy headed the Expert Committee for upgradation of the International Film Festival of India set up by the Ministry of Information and Broadcasting and submitted its findings to the Ministry of Information & Broadcasting in 2011.

== Humanitarian work ==
Nandy worked for many causes but is best known as the founder of People for Animals, India's largest animal protection NGO that Maneka Gandhi, its co-founder, heads and runs as chairperson. He received the International Humanitarian Award at the Genesis Awards in Los Angeles in 2012, supported by the Humane Society of the United States, the largest animal protection body in the US.

On 28 November 2012, Nandy founded World Compassion Day, a platform for promoting the values of compassion and ahimsa, and the first lecture on the occasion was delivered in Mumbai by the 14th Dalai Lama who spoke on the ethical treatment of animals.

== Film and television ==
Nandy founded Pritish Nandy Communications in 1993 and remained its non-executive chairman and creative mentor. The company's first programme was a chat show titled The Pritish Nandy Show which aired on Doordarshan, India's public broadcasting channel. This was the first signature show on Indian television. This was followed by Fiscal Fitness: The Pritish Nandy Business Show, India's first weekly business show, on Zee TV.

Nandy presented over 500 news and current affairs shows on Doordarshan, Zee TV and Sony TV.

He made 24 films over the years, which won numerous awards and much critical acclaim. His company Pritish Nandy Communications spearheaded the multiplex film genre in India.

The Original series made by his company, ‘’Four More Shots Please!’’ (for Amazon and streaming on Prime Video) won an International Emmy nomination in 2020 and several other awards across the world. The Amazon India Creative Head called it their most watched show out of India in a quote to the New York Times which carried a major story on the show and its impact.

‘’Modern Love Mumbai’’, his most recent Original show (2022) has been critically acclaimed and opened to a record breaking viewership.

=== Television content ===
- India 98 : The Choice – A live election debate show on Doordarshan. Moderated by Pritish Nandy and Nalini Singh. Directed by Pankuj Parashar. Won the RAPA Award.
- The Pritish Nandy Show – A signature chat show on Doordarshan and Zee TV Network. Hosted by Pritish Nandy. Directed by Umesh Agarwal. The show was later repeated on Doordarshan Metro, Jain, Sun and Udaya TV. Nominated for the Screen Videocon Awards.
- Maneka's Ark – An environment chat show on Star Plus and Doordarshan. Hosted by Maneka Gandhi. Directed by Amar Sharma and Rima Chhib.
- Mr Gaayab – A comedy serial based on the invisible man on Zee TV Network. Starring Joy Sengupta. Directed by Kushan Nandy.
- Face Off – An election chat show on Doordarshan. Hosted by Pritish Nandy and Javed Akhtar. Directed by Pankuj Parashar.
- Ek Raja Ek Rani – A romantic comedy serial on Doordarshan and Zee TV Network. Starring Shekhar Suman and Bhairavi Raichura. Directed by Kushan Nandy. Won the Aashirwad Award for Best Actor in 1999.
- Raj Kahani – A costume drama on Doordarshan. Starring R Madhavan in a double role. Directed by Kushan Nandy.
- Khwahish – A behind-the-scenes look at the big bad world of fashion on Sony Television. Starring Annie Thomas. Directed by Manu Gargi.
- Yudh – A daily soap opera on Doordarshan, Sun, Udaya and Jain TV. Starring Mahavir Bhullar and Lalit Tiwari. Directed by Kushan Nandy.
- Sanjog – A daily show based on the story of an ideal Indian family. This serial crossed 250 episodes on Doordarshan National. Starring Amar Talwar, Anjana Mumtaz, Aamir Ali Malik, etc. Directed by Ajeet Kumar.
- India−The Awakening – A daily show profiling achievers on Doordarshan. Hosted by Pritish Nandy. Directed by different directors.
- Hungama Unlimited – A sitcom that lists the best of Hindi films and pop music. Also a countdown show to hit the number one position on Doordarshan Metro in terms of viewership ratings. Directed by different directors.
- Heads & Tails – An animal rights show on Doordarshan. Hosted by Maneka Gandhi. Directed by Umesh Agarwal. Won the RAPA Award and was nominated for the Screen Videocon and Pinnacle Awards.
- Entertainment Now – A daily entertainment news show on Doordarshan. Hosted by Sagarika Sonie. Directed by Subir Dhar and Amitabh Tripathi.
- Chup Bas Lakshya – PNC's foray into regional Marathi television on Doordarshan Sahyadri. Starring Laxmikant Berde. Directed by Bhaskar Jadhav.
- New Horizons – An alternative lifestyle show on Doordarshan and Zee TV Network. Hosted by Maneka Gandhi. Won a Screen Videocon Award.
- Fiscal Fitness: The Pritish Nandy Business Show – A business show on Zee TV Network. Directed by Umesh Agarwal.
- Four More Shots Please! – An Amazon Original on Prime Video. Created by Rangita Pritish-Nandy. Produced by Pritish Nandy. Won an International Emmy nomination.
- Rat-a-tat in Unpaused – An Amazon Original anthology on Prime Video. Produced by Pritish Nandy and Rangita Pritish Nandy
- Modern Love Mumbai – An Amazon Original on Prime Video featuring six films. Produced by Pritish Nandy.
- The Royals - A Netflix Original on Netflix. Created by Rangita Pritish Nandy and Ishita Pritish Nandy. Produced by Pritish Nandy.

=== Films ===
Film	Year	Notes
Kuch Khatti Kuch Meethi	2001	Producer
Bollywood Calling	2001	Producer
The Mystic Masseur	2001	Producer
Sur	2002	Producer
Kaante	2002	Producer
Jhankaar Beats	2003	Producer
Mumbai Matinee	2003	Producer
Chameli	2004	Producer
Popcorn Khao! Mast Ho Jao	2004	Producer
Shabd	2005	Producer
Hazaaron Khwaishein Aisi	2005	Producer
Ek Khiladi Ek Haseena	2005	Producer
Ankahee	2006	Producer
Pyaar Ke Side Effects	2006	Producer
Bow Barracks Forever	2007	Producer
Just Married	2007	Producer
Ugly Aur Pagli	2008	Producer
Meerabai Not Out	2008	Producer
Dheeme Dheeme	2009	Producer
Raat Gayi Baat Gayi?	2009	Producer
Click	2010	Producer
Fatso!	2012	Producer
Shaadi Ke Side Effects	2014	Producer
Mastizaade	2015	producer

== Awards ==
- Padma Shri 1977 received from the President of India
- Karmaveer Puraskaar 2008
- International Humanitarian Award at the Genesis Awards 2012 in Hollywood, organised by the Humane Society of the United States.
- Bangladesh Liberation War Award received from the Prime Minister of Bangladesh

== Selected works ==
=== Books of poems ===
- Of Gods & Olives (Calcutta/ Mexico City, 1967) 32pp, Writers' Workshop
- On Either Side of Arrogance (Calcutta, 1968) 32pp, Writers' Workshop
- I Hand You in Turn My Nebbuk Wreath (Calcutta, 1968) 16pp, Dialogue/ Writers' Workshop
- From the Outer Bank of the Brahmaputra (New York, 1969) 38pp, New Rivers Press
- Masks to be Interpreted in Terms of Messages (Calcutta, 1971) 48pp, Writers' Workshop
- Madness is the Second Stroke (Calcutta, 1972) 56pp, Dialogue
- The Poetry of Pritish Nandy: Collected Poems (New Delhi, 1973)
- Riding the Midnight River: Selected Poems (New Delhi/ London, 1974) 144pp, Arnold Heinemann
- Dhritarashtra Downtown: Zero (Calcutta, 1974)
- Lonesong Street (Calcutta, 1975) 32pp, Poets Press
- In Secret Anarchy (Calcutta, 1976) 38pp, United Writers
- The Nowhere Man (Calcutta, 1976) 32pp, Arnold Heinemann
- A Stranger Called I (Calcutta, 1976) 48pp, Kavita/Arnold Heinemann
- Tonight, This Savage Rite/ With Kamala Das (New Delhi, 1977) 55pp, Arnold Heinemann
- Anywhere is Another Place (Calcutta, 1979) 48pp, Arnold Heinemann
- Pritish Nandy 30 (Calcutta, 1980) 30pp, Kavita/Arnold Heinemann
- The Rainbow Last Night (New Delhi, 1981) 48pp, Arnold Heinemann
- Again (New Delhi, 2010) 104pp, Rupa Publications
- Stuck on 1/Forty (New Delhi, 2012) 124pp, Amaryllis
- Tonight, This Savage Rite (New Delhi, 2014) 124pp HarperCollins

=== Book of interviews ===
- Peerless Minds: A Celebration Interviews with Thirty Incredible Indians (New Delhi, 2019) 400pp, HarperCollins, also a Special Collectors Edition limited to 500 copies

=== Verse play ===
- Rites for a Plebeian Statue (Calcutta, 1970), Writers Workshop, India.

=== Short stories ===
- Some Friends (New Delhi, 1979), Arnold Heinemann

=== Translations ===
- The Complete Poems of Samar Sen (Calcutta, 1970) 192pp, Writers Workshop
- Subhas Mukhopadhyay: Poet of the People (Calcutta, 1970) 24pp, Dialogue
- Poems from Bangladesh (Calcutta, 1971) Dialogue
- The Prose Poems of Lokenath Bhattacharya (Calcutta, 1971) Dialogue
- Bangladesh: Voice of a New Nation (Calcutta/ London/ New York, 1972)
- Shesh Lekha: The Last Poems of Rabindranath Tagore (Calcutta, 1973) Dialogue
- Modern Bengali Poetry (Chicago, 1974) Mahfil, University of Chicago
- The Flaming Giraffe: Poems by Sunil Gangopadhyay (Calcutta, 1975) Dialogue
- Songs of Mirabai with drawings by Rabin Mondal (New Delhi, 1975) Vikas Publishing
- The Poetry of Kaifi Azmi (Calcutta, 1975) 32pp, Poets Press/Arnold Heinemann
- Krishna, Krishna: Poems by Kabir (New Delhi, 1976) Vikas Publishing
- The Lord is my Shepherd (New Delhi, 1982) Vikas Publishing
- Untamed Heart: Poems by Bhartrhari with drawings by Samir Mondal (New Delhi, 1994) Rupa Publications ISBN 81-7167-216-7
- Unchained Melody: Poems by Amaru with drawings by Samir Mondal (New Delhi, 1994) Rupa Publications ISBN 81-7167-217-5
- Careless Whispers: Sanskrit Love Poetry with drawings by M.F Husain (New Delhi, 1994) Rupa Publications ISBN 81-7167-220-5
- The Isha Upanishad: illustrated by Sunandini Banerjee (Calcutta, 2013) Seagull Books

=== Poetry recordings ===
- Lonesong Street, with Ananda Shankar (EMI, 1977)
- Hazaaron Khwaishein Aisi, with Shantanu Moitra (Virgin, 2004)

=== Bengali translation ===
- Pritish Nandyr Kobita translated by Amarendra Chakravarti (Calcutta, 1975)
- Pritish Nandyr Kobita translated by Shakti Chattopadhyay (Calcutta, 1978)

=== Anthologies edited ===
- Indian Poetry in English: 1947–1972 (Calcutta, 1972) Oxford & IBH
- Indian Poetry in English Today (New Delhi, 1973)
- Modern Indian Poetry (New Delhi/ London, 1974)
- Modern Indian Love Poetry (New Delhi, 1974) Vikas Publishing
- Modern Indian Love Stories (New Delhi, 1974) Vikas Publishing
- Strangertime (New Delhi, 1976) Sterling Publishers

== Appearances in the following poetry Anthologies ==
- The Golden Treasure of Writers Workshop Poetry (2008) ed. by Rubana Huq and published by Writers Workshop, Calcutta
