= Calcutta If You Must Exile Me =

Poem by Pritish Nandy

"Calcutta If You Must Exile Me" is the best known single poem of the renowned Indian English poet and media personality Pritish Nandy. The poem is widely anthologised in major Indian English poetry collections and is regarded as a pioneering classic in modern Indian English writing. The poem is remarkable for its breathless tempo, vivid imagery and unsuppressed angst at societal decadence. The poem is addressed to the Indian city of Kolkata, although not in eulogical terms.

== Origin and the Calcutta connection ==
The poem was written in the late 1970s or early 1980s. The poet himself reminiscences in a 2009 interview that the poem describes his feelings of a city he left 27 years ago.

The poet was a resident of Calcutta (now Kolkata), and in the poet's own words, the poem is based on his direct real life experience of the city. The poem evokes the mood of a man born in Calcutta, bred in Calcutta and living in Calcutta.

== Structure and criticism ==
The poem is notable for its fast tempo, impassioned conversational diction and sharp images depicting the "brutalities of city life. The most unusual feature of the poem is that it does not have a single punctuation mark - no comma, fullstop or hyphen. In fact, the entire poem is composed only of words, without any hyphenation or fancy spacing, almost as a rebellion against regimentation of any poetic structure. Such a style was a trendsetter during the period of its composition.

In the poem, although Nandy portrays the ruthlessness prevalent in the city, he loves the city so much that he does not want to leave it.

== Legacy ==
The unique style of the poem has inspired many modern Indian poets. The poem was harbinger of a new style of realistic writing on urban life in fast-paced tempo.

== See also ==
- Text of Full Poem
- pritish Nandy - A Short Biography
- Indian poetry
- Indian Writing in English
- Popular Indian Poems
