= Stardust Award for Actor of the Year – Female =

Annual acting award

The Stardust Star of the Year Award - Female is chosen by the readers of the annual Stardust magazine. The award honours a star that has made an impact with their acting in that certain film.

== Multiple wins ==
Wins	Recipient
2	Kareena Kapoor, Preity Zinta, Priyanka Chopra, Deepika Padukone

== Awards ==
Here is a list of the award winners and the films for which they won.

Year	Actress	Film
2004	Preity Zinta	Kal Ho Naa Ho
2005	Preity Zinta	Veer-Zaara
2006	Rani Mukerji	Black
2007	Aishwarya Rai	Dhoom 2
2008	Kareena Kapoor	Jab We Met
2009	Priyanka Chopra	Fashion & Dostana
2010	Kareena Kapoor	Kurbaan
2011	Kajol	My Name Is Khan
2012	Vidya Balan	The Dirty Picture
2013	Priyanka Chopra	Barfi!
2014	Deepika Padukone	Happy New Year & Finding Fanny
2015	Deepika Padukone	Piku
2016	Anushka Sharma	Ae Dil Hai Mushkil & Sultan

== See also ==
- Stardust Awards
- Bollywood
- Cinema of India
