= Kareena Kapoor =

Indian actress (born 1980)

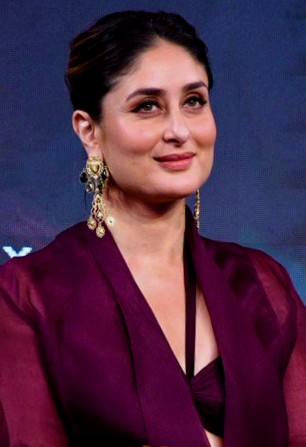
- Kapoor in 2023
- Born: 21 September 1980 (age 46); Bombay, Maharashtra, India
- Occupation: Actress
- Years active: 2000–present
- Works: Full list
- Spouse: Saif Ali Khan (m. 2012)
- Children: 2
- Parents: Randhir Kapoor (father); Babita Kapoor (mother)
- Family: Kapoor family; Pataudi family
- Awards: Full list

Kareena Kapoor Khan (pronounced [kəˈriːna kəˈpuːr xɑːn]; née Kapoor; born 21 September 1980) is an Indian film actress. A prolific leading lady of Hindi cinema since 2000, she is noted for her roles in a range of film genres—from romantic comedies to crime dramas. Kapoor is the recipient of several awards, including six Filmfare Awards, and as of 2024, is one of Hindi cinema's highest-paid actresses.

Born into the Kapoor family, she is the daughter of actors Randhir Kapoor and Babita Kapoor, and the younger sister of actress Karisma Kapoor. After making her acting debut in 2000 in Refugee, Kapoor established herself the following year with several roles, including in the top-grossing drama Kabhi Khushi Kabhie Gham. This was followed by a series of commercial failures and negative reviews for her repetitive roles. An against-type performance as a sex worker in the 2004 drama Chameli marked a turning point in her career. She earned critical recognition for her portrayal of a riot victim in the 2004 drama Dev and a character based on Desdemona in the 2006 crime film Omkara. Her performance as a loquacious woman in the romantic comedy Jab We Met (2007) earned her the Filmfare Award for Best Actress.

Further praise came for her dramatic performances in Kurbaan (2009), Talaash: The Answer Lies Within, Heroine (both 2012), Udta Punjab (2016) and Laal Singh Chaddha (2022). Her highest-grossing releases include the comedy-dramas 3 Idiots (2009) and Bajrangi Bhaijaan (2015), the action films Bodyguard (2011) and Singham Returns (2014), and the comedies Golmaal 3 (2010) and Good Newwz (2019). She has also starred in the female-led comedies Veere Di Wedding (2018) and Crew (2024).

Kapoor Khan is married to actor Saif Ali Khan, with whom she has two sons. Her off-screen life is the subject of widespread coverage in India. She is known for being outspoken and assertive and is recognised for her fashion style. Beside film acting, Kapoor participates in stage shows, hosts a radio show and has contributed as a co-writer to two autobiographical memoirs and two books of nutrition guides. She has started her own line of clothing and cosmetics for women, and has worked with UNICEF since 2014 to advocate for the education of girls and an increase in quality based education in India.

== Early life ==
Born on 21 September 1980 in Bombay (now Mumbai), Kapoor (often informally referred to as 'Bebo') is the younger daughter of Randhir Kapoor and Babita (née Shivdasani); her elder sister Karisma is also an actress. Kapoor is the paternal granddaughter of actor and filmmaker Raj Kapoor, maternal granddaughter of actor Hari Shivdasani, and great-granddaughter of filmmaker Prithviraj Kapoor. The actors Rishi Kapoor and Neetu Kapoor are her uncle and aunt respectively, and actor Ranbir Kapoor is also her cousin.

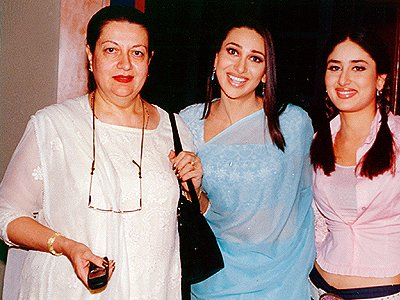
Pictured with mother Babita (left) and sister Karisma. In an interview with journalist Vir Sanghvi, Kapoor stated that growing up with the two of them helped her become strong and independent.

According to Kapoor, her name "Kareena" was derived from the book Anna Karenina, which her mother read while she was pregnant with her. Kapoor is of Punjabi descent on her father's side, and on her mother's side she is of Sindhi and British descent.

Describing herself as a naughty, spoilt child, Kapoor's exposure to films from a young age kindled her interest in acting; she was particularly inspired by the work of actresses Nargis and Meena Kumari. Despite her family background, her father disapproved of women entering films because he believed it conflicted with the traditional maternal duties and responsibility of women in the family. This led to a conflict between her parents and they lived separately before reconciling in October 2007. She was raised by her mother, who worked several jobs to support her daughters until Karisma debuted as an actress in 1991. Although her father was not present for most her childhood, Kapoor remarked that he played an important role in her life.

Kapoor attended Jamnabai Narsee School in Mumbai, followed by Welham Girls' School in Dehradun. She attended the institution primarily to satisfy her mother, though later admitted to liking the experience. According to Kapoor, she was not inclined towards academics though received good grades in all her classes except mathematics. Upon graduating from Welham, she returned to Mumbai and studied commerce for two years at Mithibai College. Kapoor then registered for a three-month summer course in microcomputers at Harvard Summer School in the United States. She later developed an interest in law, and enrolled at the Government Law College, Mumbai; during this period, she developed a long-lasting passion for reading. However, after completing her first year, she decided to pursue her interest in acting, though she later regretted not having completed her education. She began training at an acting institute in Mumbai mentored by Kishore Namit Kapoor, a member of the Film and Television Institute of India.

== Career and personal life ==
=== Career beginnings, breakthrough and setback (2000–2003) ===
While training at the institute, Kapoor was cast as the lead in Rakesh Roshan's Kaho Naa... Pyaar Hai (2000), opposite Hrithik Roshan. Several days into the filming, however, she abandoned the production since more prominence was given to the director's son than her. She debuted later that year alongside Abhishek Bachchan in J. P. Dutta's Refugee. Set during the Indo-Pakistani War of 1971, Kapoor was introduced as Naaz, a Bangladeshi girl with whom Bachchan's character falls in love. Dutta cast her for the combination of youthfulness and innocence he found in her, and Kapoor considered their collaboration to be a learning experience that helped her personally and professionally. Taran Adarsh of Bollywood Hungama noted "the ease with which she emotes the most difficult of scenes", and India Today reported that she belonged to a new breed of Hindi film actors that breaks away from character stereotypes. Refugee was a moderate box-office success in India and Kapoor's performance earned her the Filmfare Award for Best Female Debut.

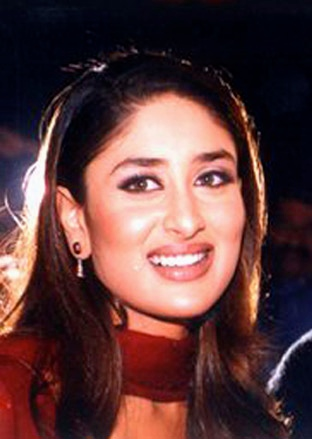
Kapoor at the launch of a book on Kabhi Khushi Kabhie Gham in 2001

Kapoor was paired opposite Tusshar Kapoor in Satish Kaushik's box-office hit Mujhe Kucch Kehna Hai (2001). A review in The Hindu noted that based on her first two films, she was "definitely the actress to watch out for". She next starred in Subhash Ghai's Yaadein, followed by Abbas–Mustan's moderately successful thriller Ajnabee. Later that year, she appeared in Santosh Sivan's period epic Aśoka, a partly fictionalised account of the life of the Indian emperor Ashoka. Featured opposite Shah Rukh Khan, Kapoor found herself challenged playing the complex personality of her character Kaurwaki with whom Ashoka falls in love. Aśoka was screened at the Venice and 2001 Toronto International Film Festivals, and received generally positive reviews internationally but failed to do well in India, which critics attributed to famed actor Shah Rukh Khan's portrayal of the emperor Ashoka. Jeff Vice of The Deseret News commended her compelling screen presence. At the 47th Filmfare Awards, Aśoka was nominated for five awards including a Best Actress nomination for Kapoor.

A breakthrough in Kapoor's career came when she was cast by Karan Johar as Pooja ("Poo", a good-natured, superficial girl) in the 2001 melodrama Kabhi Khushi Kabhie Gham. She found little resemblance between herself and her "over-the-top" character, and modeled Poo's personality on that of Johar. Filming the big-budget production, alongside an ensemble cast was a new experience for Kapoor, and she recalls it fondly as a dream come true. Kabhi Khushi Kabhie Gham was an immensely popular release, finishing as India's second highest-grossing film of the year and Kapoor's highest-grossing film to that point. It became one of the biggest Bollywood success of all time in the overseas market, earning over ₹1 billion (US$10 million) worldwide. Taran Adarsh described Kapoor as "one of the main highlights of the film", and she received her second Filmfare nomination for the role—her first for Best Supporting Actress—as well as nominations at the International Indian Academy (IIFA) and Screen Awards.

Box Office India reported that the success of Mujhe Kucch Kehna Hai and Kabhi Khushi Kabhie Gham established Kapoor as a leading actress of Hindi cinema, and Rediff.com published that with Aśoka she had become the highest-paid Indian actress to that point earning ₹15 million (US$160,000) per film. During 2002 and 2003, Kapoor continued to work in a number of projects but experienced a setback. All six films in which she starred—Mujhse Dosti Karoge!, Jeena Sirf Merre Liye, Talaash: The Hunt Begins..., Khushi, Main Prem Ki Diwani Hoon, and the four-hour war epic LOC Kargil—were critically and commercially unsuccessful. Critics described her performances in these films as variations of the character she played in Kabhi Khushi Kabhie Gham, and expressed concern that she was becoming typecast. She later spoke positively of this period, recalling it as a beneficial lesson which taught her to work harder.

=== Professional expansion (2004–2006) ===
By 2004, Kapoor, who had confessed to having entered the film industry strictly for financial reasons, was eager on broadening her range as an actor and thus decided to accept more challenging roles in addition to the archetypical glamorous lead. Under the direction of Sudhir Mishra, Kapoor starred in Chameli as a golden-hearted prostitute who meets with a widowed investment banker (Rahul Bose). When Kapoor was first offered the part, she passed on it, explaining that she would be uncomfortable in the role. She relented when Mishra approached her for the second time, and in preparation for the role, visited several of Mumbai's red-light districts at night to study the mannerisms of sex workers and the way they dressed. With a production budget of ₹20 million (US$210,000), the independent film marked a departure from the high-profile productions Kapoor previously starred in. The Times of India praised her for having exceeded all expectations; Rediff.com, however, found her portrayal unconvincing and excessively stereotypical, comparing her mannerisms to a caricature. Chameli marked a significant turning point in Kapoor's career and she received a special jury recognition at the 49th Filmfare Awards.

Kapoor next co-starred in Mani Ratnam's Yuva, a composite film about three youngsters from different strata of society whose lives intersect by a car accident; she featured as Vivek Oberoi's romantic interest. Despite not having "much of a role", she agreed to the project due to her desire to work with Ratnam. Film critic Subhash K. Jha concurred that her role was insubstantial, but further stated that Kapoor uses her "character traits to her ... advantage to create a girl who is at once enigmatic and all-there". She then appeared alongside Amitabh Bachchan and Fardeen Khan in Govind Nihalani's critically acclaimed film Dev, which revolved around the 2002 Hindu-Muslim riots in Gujarat. Kapoor starred as a Muslim victim and contributed in the soundtrack by providing the vocals. Nihalani was initially hesitant to cast a mainstream commercial actress but found that Kapoor displayed a level of intelligence and sensitivity beyond her years. She was eager to work with him, as his films Ardh Satya (1983) and Tamas (1988) gave her a deeper appreciation for cinema, and identified with her character's ability to be strong yet simple. It earned her critical acclaim and a Filmfare Critics Award for Best Actress.

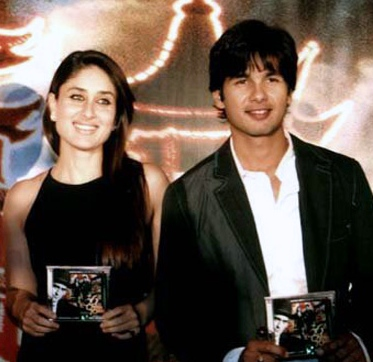
Pictured with co-actor Shahid Kapoor at the audio release of 36 China Town in 2006. During the filming of Fida, the actress began a romantic relationship with Kapoor, whom she later described as having "a major positive influence in my life."

Kapoor was cast for the first time as a villain in Fida (2004), a thriller about an online heist. Critics noted a distinct progression from her earlier roles. That same year, she starred in Abbas–Mustan's thriller Aitraaz and Priyadarshan's comedy Hulchul. Aitraaz follows the story of a man (Akshay Kumar) accused of sexual harassment by his female superior (Priyanka Chopra). Kapoor was offered Chopra's part, but decided to play Kumar's wife, knowing that Indian women would better identify with her character. Jitesh Pillai of The Times of India found Kapoor to have a small role, but noted that she "shines through brightly earning her big moment in the courtroom sequence". Meanwhile, Hulchul became Kapoor's first commercial success in three years. Her next film, Bewafaa, in 2005, was panned by critics. Nikhat Kazmi believed that to become a serious actress Kapoor was embodying a maturer, more-jaded character beyond her years in Bewafaa. Her final two releases of the year included the romantic dramas Kyon Ki and Dosti: Friends Forever, both of which underperformed at the box office. In her next two releases—the thriller 36 China Town and the comedy Chup Chup Ke (both 2006)—she starred opposite Shahid Kapoor. 36 China Town was a commercial success and Chup Chup Ke performed moderately well.

The filmmaker Vishal Bhardwaj saw Kapoor in Yuva, and was sufficiently impressed to cast her in his next project, Omkara, an adaptation of William Shakespeare's tragedy Othello set against the backdrop of the political system in Uttar Pradesh. Kapoor featured as Desdemona and was challenged on portraying the character's inner turmoil, which she believed was much more subtle and subdued. She subsequently attended several script-reading sessions with the entire cast, and described the project as a special one for her. Omkara premiered at the 2006 Cannes Film Festival and was screened at the Cairo International Film Festival. Filmfare praised her ability to convey the various emotions her character went through, and her portrayal earned her a fourth Filmfare and first Screen Award. Kapoor considers it to be a favourite among her roles and compared her portrayal of Dolly with her own evolving maturity as a woman.

=== Established actress (2007–2011) ===
Kapoor next teamed with Shahid Kapoor for a fourth time in the romantic comedy Jab We Met (2007), in which she portrayed Geet Dhillon, a vivacious Sikh girl with a zest for life. Director Imtiaz Ali was not a well-known figure before its production, but Kapoor agreed to the film after being fascinated with his script. She collaborated closely with Ali to build her character and was challenged on effectively portraying Dhillon's exuberant personality without making it caricaturish. Jab We Met was received favourably by critics and became successful at the box office. The BBC commented that the role required a mixture of naivety and spontaneity, and was impressed with Kapoor's effort; Rajeev Masand labelled her the film's "biggest strength". Kapoor was awarded the Filmfare Award for Best Actress and her second Screen Award. While shooting for Jab We Met, Kapoor and Shahid ended their four-year relationship. She admitted to being heartbroken by the split and hoped that they would reconcile their friendship in the future.

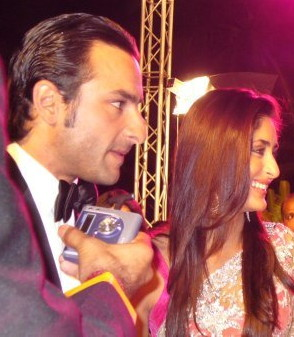
Kapoor alongside Saif Ali Khan at the 53rd Filmfare Awards, 2008. Following her breakup with Shahid Kapoor, she started dating Khan who announced their relationship to the media at the 2007 Lakme Fashion Week.

The following year, Kapoor co-starred in Vijay Krishna Acharya's Tashan, where she met her future husband in actor Saif Ali Khan. Although highly anticipated by the audience before release, the film underperformed at the box office. After providing her voice for the character of the love interest of a street dog in the Yash Raj Films and Walt Disney Pictures animated film Roadside Romeo, Kapoor played a mistrustful wife who believed her husband was unfaithful in Rohit Shetty's comedy Golmaal Returns. A sequel to the 2006 film Golmaal: Fun Unlimited, the film had an ambivalent reception from critics. The Indian Express believed the screenplay was derivative, concluding that her character and performance lacked originality. Golmaal Returns was a financial success with global revenues of ₹793 million (US$8.2 million).

In 2009, Kapoor was cast as Simrita Rai, a surgeon who moonlights as a model, in Sabbir Khan's battle-of-the-sexes comedy Kambakkht Ishq. Set in Los Angeles, it was the first Indian film shot at Universal Studios. The film was poorly received by critics but became an economic success. The box-office flop Main Aurr Mrs Khanna came next, following which she played the leading lady in the dramatic thriller Kurbaan. Starring Kapoor as a woman confined to house arrest after discovering that her husband is a terrorist, she found the film to be an emotionally draining experience due to how difficult it was to disconnect from her character. Kapoor received her fourth Filmfare Best Actress nomination. Gaurav Malani of The Economic Times commented that after a long time the actress was given a substantial role with a potential to boost her career, while Subhash K. Jha described it as her "most consistently pitched performance to date" played with sensitivity.

Kapoor's second Filmfare nomination that year came for Rajkumar Hirani's 3 Idiots, based on the novel Five Point Someone by Chetan Bhagat, co-starring Aamir Khan, R. Madhavan and Sharman Joshi. Her role is that of Pia, a medical student and Khan's love interest. The film emerged as the highest-grossing Bollywood film of all time up until then, grossing ₹2.03 billion (US$21 million) in India. It also did well internationally, earning over ₹1.08 billion (US$11 million), the second biggest Bollywood success ever in the overseas market. Deccan Herald opined that Kapoor "brings a dollop of sunshine and feminine grace to an otherwise masculine tale", taking note of her spontaneity while playing her character. 3 Idiots received several Best Film recognitions at major Indian award functions, and Kapoor was awarded the IIFA Award for Best Actress, among others.

Kapoor began the new decade with a leading role in the poorly received romantic comedy Milenge Milenge (2010). Critics found the film to be outdated with stereotypical characters. A supporting role in We Are Family, an official adaptation of the Hollywood tearjerker Stepmom (1998), proved more rewarding. In an attempt to bring her interpretation to the part originally played by Julia Roberts, Kapoor refrained from watching Stepmom again and was drawn to the complexity of her character. Priyanka Roy of The Telegraph criticised it for being melodramatic, but praised Kapoor for enhancing the whole film. Kapoor was awarded the Best Supporting Actress at the 56th Filmfare Awards. She reunited with director Rohit Shetty for Golmaal 3, which received mixed reviews but earned more than ₹1 billion (US$10 million) domestically. For her performance, Kapoor received Best Actress nominations at various award ceremonies including Filmfare.

Further success came to Kapoor in 2011 when she starred as the love interest of Salman Khan's character in Bodyguard, a remake of the 2010 Malayalam film of the same name. The film was not well received by critics, though became a financial success, with a domestic total of ₹1.4 billion (US$15 million)—India's highest-earning film of the year. A review in Mint dismissed Kapoor's role as ornamental; Mid-Day argued she "actually manages to bring her caricature of a role alive". She next appeared in the Anubhav Sinha-directed sci-fi film Ra.One, revolving on a villainous videogame character (Shah Rukh Khan) who escapes into the real world. Made on a budget of ₹1.5 billion (US$16 million), the film became one of the biggest earners of the year with a worldwide total of over ₹2.4 billion (US$25 million)—despite negative media coverage of its box-office performance—and Kapoor's fourth major commercial success in three consecutive years.

=== Marriage, continued success and motherhood (2012–2017) ===
Kapoor followed her success in Bodyguard and Ra.One with a role in Shakun Batra's Ek Main Aur Ekk Tu (2012) opposite Imran Khan. Set in Las Vegas, the romantic comedy follows the story of two strangers who get married one night after getting drunk. She played Riana Braganza, a carefree young woman, and was particularly drawn to the qualities of her character. The film received positive reviews and was an economic success, grossing a total of ₹530 million (US$5.5 million) in India and abroad. The Hollywood Reporter found her "endearingly natural"; Sukanya Verma of Rediff.com complimented her for playing a non-ornamental role since that in Jab We Met. She next appeared in Agent Vinod, an espionage thriller directed by Sriram Raghavan. Kapoor was enthusiastic about the project, but it met with a tepid response and she was described as miscast. Asked why she took the role, Kapoor described it as an opportunity to attempt something she had never done before.

For her next feature, Kapoor was cast as a fading movie star in Madhur Bhandarkar's Heroine. Initially skeptical about taking on the part whose personality she felt to be far removed from her own, she agreed after Bhandarkar enforced his faith in her. Although not a method actor, Kapoor believed that the intense role had left her on edge in her personal life and refrained from taking on any other projects. Reviewers found the film monotonous, but noted that it was watchable primarily due to Kapoor's performance. Rajeev Masand described it as "a deliciously camp performance" that was played "with utmost sincerity". Bollywood Hungama opined that it was her best work to date and concluded that despite an inconsistent character, Kapoor embellished it "with a rare vulnerability and an exceptional inner life". At the annual Stardust Awards, Kapoor garnered the Editor's Choice for Best Actress, and received additional nominations at Filmfare, IIFA, Producers Guild, Screen and Stardust.

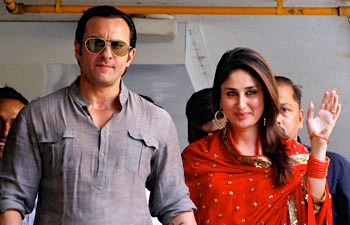
Kapoor and Saif Ali Khan at their registry marriage ceremony in 2012. In a blog published by The Wall Street Journal, Rupa Subramanya described the marriage as India's "wedding and social event of the year".

On 16 October 2012, Kapoor married actor Saif Ali Khan in a private ceremony in Bandra, Mumbai, and she gave birth to their sons in 2016 and 2021 respectively. Kapoor stated that despite adding Khan to her name she would continue practising Hinduism after marriage. Talaash: The Answer Lies Within, in which she played the prostitute Rosie (as Kareena Kapoor Khan), was her final release of 2012. The film is set against the backdrop of Mumbai's red-light districts and follows the travails of a police officer (Aamir Khan) who is assigned the duty of solving a mysterious car accident. The Telegraph found Kapoor Khan a standout among the other performers, adding that "she brings an unseen mix of oomph and emotion". With global revenues of ₹1.74 billion (US$18 million), the film emerged as a box office hit, and earned Kapoor Khan Best Actress nominations at the Screen, Stardust and Zee Cine award ceremonies.

In 2013, Kapoor Khan collaborated with Ajay Devgn for the fourth time in Prakash Jha's Satyagraha, a socio-political drama loosely inspired by social activist Anna Hazare's fight against corruption in 2011. The film received little praise from critics and underperformed at the box office earning ₹675 million (US$7.0 million) domestically. Following an appearance in the poorly received romantic comedy Gori Tere Pyaar Mein (2013), Kapoor Khan decreased her workload for the next two years to focus on her marriage and family. She took on smaller parts where she played the love-interest of Ajay Devgn in the action film Singham Returns (2014) and Salman Khan in the drama Bajrangi Bhaijaan (2015). The former, in which Kapoor Khan had a role written specifically for her, met with mixed reviews and Kapoor received criticism for taking a role of minimal importance. Conversely, the film was a financial success with a revenue of over ₹1.4 billion (US$15 million). Kabir Khan's Bajrangi Bhaijaan emerged as India's highest-earning film of the year grossing a total of ₹3.20 billion (US$33 million), and earned the National Film Award for Best Popular Film Providing Wholesome Entertainment.

In 2016, Kapoor Khan took on a starring role in Ki & Ka, about gender stereotypes, to which she was particularly drawn for its relevance. Critics were divided in their opinion of the film, but it emerged a financial success grossing over ₹1 billion (US$10 million) worldwide. Meena Iyer of The Times of India mentioned Kapoor as remarkable, and Sukanya Verma considered the actress to be the film's prime asset. She next featured in Udta Punjab (2016), a crime drama that documents the substance abuse endemic in the Indian state Punjab. Kapoor Khan was initially reluctant to do the film due to the length of her role, but agreed after reading the completed script and partially waived her fees to star in it. Udta Punjab generated controversy when the Central Board of Film Certification deemed that the film represented Punjab in a negative light. The Bombay High Court later cleared the film for exhibition with one scene cut. Rediff.com stated that the film relies on her character, and Mehul S. Thakkar of Deccan Chronicle wrote that she was successful in delivering such a strong performance. For her performance, Kapoor Khan received a nomination for Best Supporting Actress at the Filmfare and Zee Cine award ceremonies.

=== Comedies and professional expansion (2018–present) ===
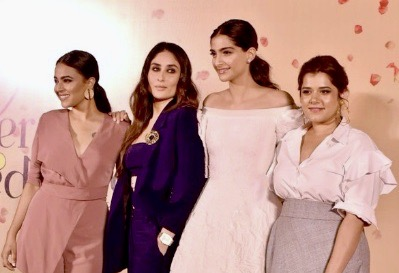
Kapoor Khan with co-stars Swara Bhaskar, Sonam Kapoor and Shikha Talsania (l-r) at a promotional event for Veere Di Wedding in 2018

Following the birth of her first child, Kapoor Khan was persuaded by her husband to return to acting. She was keen to work on a project that would accommodate her parental commitments and found it in Shashanka Ghosh's female buddy film, Veere Di Wedding (2018). Initially approached for the project in 2016, the makers rewrote Kapoor Khan's role to accommodate her pregnancy, but the lack of maternity insurance in India led filming to begin after she gave birth. She liked the idea of telling a story of friendship and love from a female perspective, which she believed was rare in Hindi film, and was pleased to work with three other leading ladies. Anna M. M. Vetticad praised the film for portraying women with "agency, flaws, humanity and, above all, a sense of humour", and took note of Kapoor Khan's restrained performance. With a worldwide gross of over ₹1.38 billion (US$14 million), Veere Di Wedding emerged as one of the highest-grossing female-led Hindi films.

Kapoor Khan reteamed with Akshay Kumar in Good Newwz (2019), a comedy about two couples' tryst with in vitro fertilisation. Mint's Udita Jhunjunwala wrote that it is "hard to keep your eyes off Kapoor Khan". She received Best Actress nominations at Filmfare, IIFA and Zee Cine Awards, and the film earned over ₹3 billion (US$31 million) to emerge as the fifth highest-grossing Hindi film of the year. She next took a supporting role in Angrezi Medium (2020), a spiritual sequel to Hindi Medium. According to her, it was a deliberate attempt to move away from her comfort zone; she filmed her role in 10 days while she was accompanying her husband on his film shoot in London. The feature released in India amid the COVID-19 pandemic and its commercial performance was affected due to the closing of the cinemas. Nandini Ramnath of Scroll.in commended her "ability to glitter in a handful of moments", but Vinayak Chakravorty for Outlook thought the portions involving Kapoor Khan were inessential to the story.

In 2022, Kapoor Khan starred in an adaptation of Forrest Gump, titled Laal Singh Chaddha, starring Aamir Khan in the title role. She played Rupa, a troubled aspiring actress; Devesh Sharma of Filmfare opined that her performance "filled with angst and grit" was one of the best in her career. Amidst a significant campaign by Hindu nationalists to boycott the film due to Aamir Khan's political affiliations, Laal Singh Chaddha failed to recoup its estimated production budget of ₹1.5 billion (US$16 million). She received another Best Actress nomination at Filmfare.

Eager to work in the thriller genre, Kapoor Khan signed on for two such films: Jaane Jaan and The Buckingham Murders (both 2023). She has said that these projects would mark the beginning of a new phase in her career, in which she would focus more on artistic merit than stardom. Her roles in them marked a departure from the glamorous roles she had a reputation for portraying. Jaane Jaan, a Netflix film adaptation of Higashino Keigo's novel The Devotion of Suspect X from filmmaker Sujoy Ghosh, starred her as a single mother involved in a murder. The Hindu's Shilajit Mitra commended her "brisk, unfussy performance" and appreciated her for playing "as part of a team, complementing instead of trying to commandeer scenes". In terms of global viewing hours, the film emerged as the most-watched Indian film on Netflix in 2023. Hansal Mehta's The Buckingham Murders starred her as a detective in a small town in Buckinghamshire, for which she modelled her character on Kate Winslet's role in Mare of Easttown. The film, shot predominantly in English, marked her first production venture. It premiered at the 2023 BFI London Film Festival. WION's Shomini Sen commended Kapoor Khan's restrained portrayal of a deglamourised character. It had a theatrical release the following year, where it had poor box-office returns.

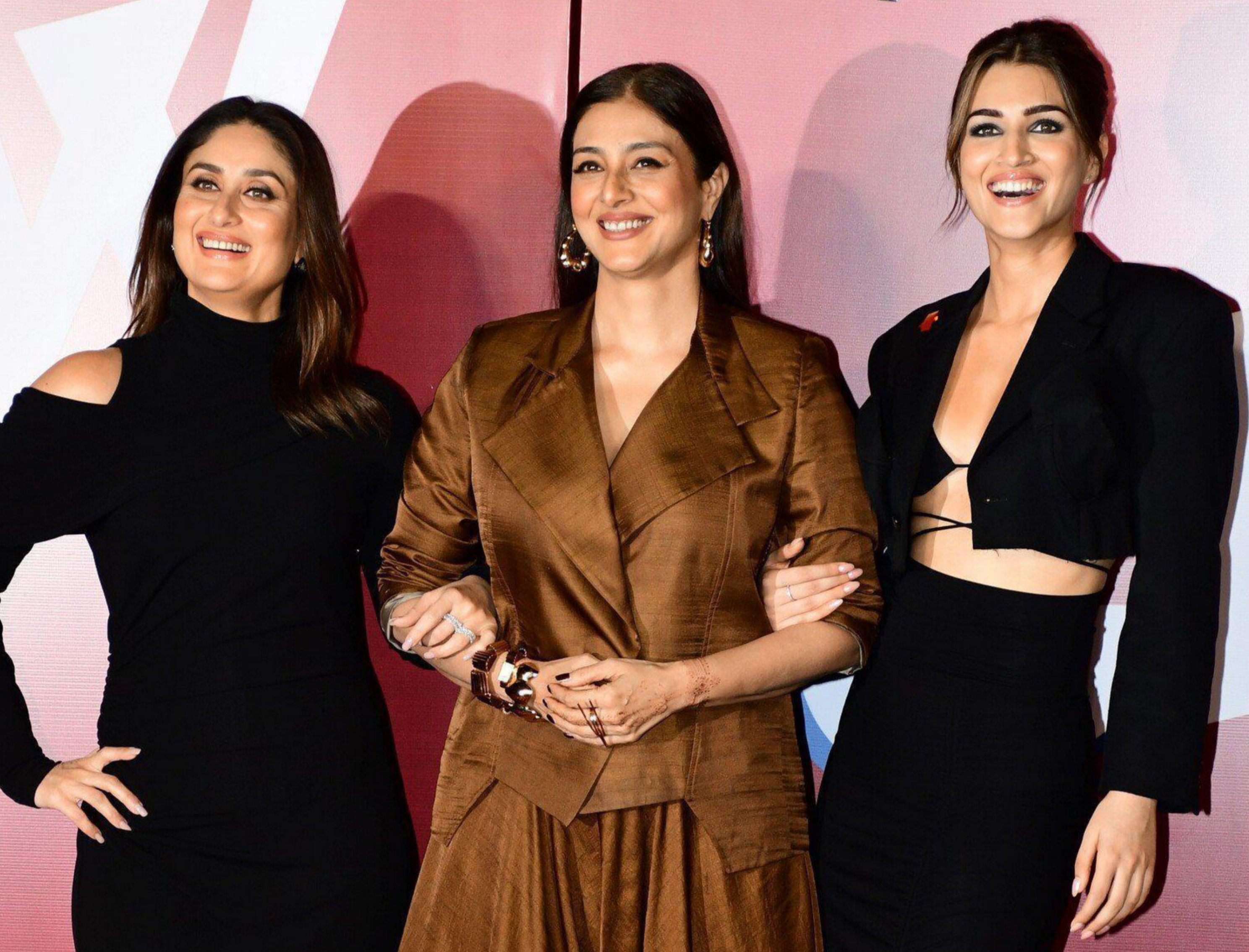
Kapoor Khan with co-stars Tabu, and Kriti Sanon (l-r) at an event for Crew in 2024

Kapoor Khan returned to commercial cinema with the female-led heist comedy Crew (2024), co-starring Tabu and Kriti Sanon. For their roles as flight attendants, the trio received training from former cabin crew members. Outlook's Garima Das praised her look and comic timing. The film emerged as another female-led commercial success for Kapoor Khan after Veere Di Wedding, and its success led Box Office India to credit her amongst the most successful Hindi film actresses of all time. She next reprised her role as Avni Kamat Singham amongst an ensemble cast in the Cop Universe sequel Singham Again, representing the character of Sita. In his negative review for NDTV, Saibal Chatterjee lamented how Kapoor Khan's character was reduced to being "projected as hapless and vulnerable". Singham Again had modest box-office returns on its high production budget.

In 2026, Kapoor Khan starred as a police officer in Meghna Gulzar's crime thriller Daayra, portraying a character she described as going beyond the traditionally masculine depiction of female police officers in Hindi cinema. She found it particularly challenging to restrain her typically animated expressions for the stoic character. However, Rahul Desai for the Indian edition of The Hollywood Reporter opined that Kapoor Khan had been miscast in the role, finding unfavourable echoes of her character from Kabhi Khushi Kabhie Gham in her performance. The film's box-office collection on its opening day was the lowest of the actress' career.

== Other work ==
=== Fashion and publication ===
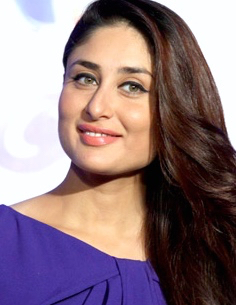
Kapoor at an event for Head & Shoulders in 2014

Alongside her acting work, Kapoor has established a career as a designer. During her five-year association with the retail chain Globus, Kapoor became the first Indian actress to launch her own line of clothing for women; she described the collaboration as being "special" and "reflective of my personal sense of style". Her collection made its debut several months later in stores across India, and was well received. Following the end of her contract with Globus, she expressed a desire to work with a design house to release her clothing line internationally, but later explained that those plans were on hold. In August 2018, Kapoor Khan collaborated with Lakmé Cosmetics to launch her own line of cosmetics.

In 2009, Kapoor worked with nutritionist Rujuta Diwekar on Don't Lose Your Mind, Lose Your Weight, a book on the principles of healthy eating habits. Published by Random House, the book was well received by critics, and sold 10,000 copies within its first twenty days. A follow-up, Women and The Weight Loss Tamasha, was released two years later. It addressed the weight loss concerns and eating habits of women in various parts of their life, and featured Kapoor in a voice-over for the audiobook. In 2013, Kapoor released her autobiographical memoir, The Style Diary of a Bollywood Diva, which was criticised by Mint for its "too-breezy" writing. Co-written alongside Rochelle Pinto, it became the first book to be launched under the Shobhaa De imprint of Penguin Books—a set of series that included celebrity memoirs, guides and biographies. Later that year, she collaborated with Diwekar for the third time on The Indian Food Wisdom and The Art of Eating Right, a documentary film about nutrition. In 2021, Kapoor Khan released Pregnancy Bible (co-authored with Aditi Shah Bhimjani), which became a commercial success.

=== Philanthropy ===
During her years in the film industry, Kapoor has been actively involved in promoting children's education and the safety of women. In June 2010, she took part in the international campaign 1GOAL Education for All, and was appointed ambassador for the Shakti Campaign—a project launched by NDTV to combat violence against women—in commemoration of the 100th anniversary of International Women's Day. Two years later, Kapoor Khan launched Channel V's anti-rape mobile app 'VithU'; she stated that with an increasing amount of violence against women in India, "[i]t [was] important for actors to stand up for issues because they can reach out to a lot of people."

In January 2014, Kapoor Khan began working with UNICEF to advocate the education of girls and increase quality based education in India. Speaking of her association, she expressed hope in creating places "where children feel safe and secure, and where interactive and creative tools are used to ensure that children are happy and learning." During the first year, Kapoor Khan visited schools in the states of Rajasthan and Maharashtra where she interacted with students and participated in fundraising events hosted by the Kasturba Gandhi Balika Vidyalaya organisation in the Jalna district. Along with UNICEF India's Goodwill Ambassador (Sharmila Tagore), Kapoor Khan hosted a charity dinner to help raise awareness for the development of underprivileged kids, and launched the 'Child-Friendly School and Systems' (CFSS) package. She later donated an equivalent amount of the funds raised during a joint initiative by UNICEF and Groupon for a higher-quality learning environment in Indian schools. She was elevated as a national UNICEF Goodwill Ambassador for India in May 2024.

The following year, she awarded 31 students and 5 teachers for their contribution towards the field of education in Chhattisgarh at the concluding ceremony of Child Rights Protection week. Also that year, Kapoor Khan provided a voice-over for the documentary film Girl Rising: Woh Padhegi, Woh Udegi [She will learn, she will fly] for the organisation of the same name, and produced a documentary on women's empowerment. In June 2016, she spoke at an event organised by UNICEF in Lucknow to promote menstrual hygiene management. In 2018 she launched UNICEF's "Every Child Alive" campaign to promote affordable and quality health care for mothers and their newborn. In May 2018, she was invited as a keynote speaker for a Mother's Day event in New Delhi organised by UNICEF.

Additionally, Kapoor has made public appearances to support other charitable organisations. She performed at a fundraiser for the World Youth Peace Summit in November 2003, and participated in a concert to raise money for victims of the 2004 Indian Ocean earthquake and tsunami. She visited Indian jawans (troops) in Rajasthan, for a special Holi weekend episode of NDTV's reality show Jai Jawaan. In 2010, Kapoor adopted the village of Chanderi in Madhya Pradesh as part of NDTV's Greenathon Campaign, to provide the village with a regular supply of electricity. Four years later, she participated in a campaign to raise awareness on hunger and malnutrition in the world and made donations to the Kashmir flood relief. In September 2016, Kapoor Khan attended the inaugural of Global Citizen India—a joint initiative by the music festival of the same name and The Global Education and Leadership Foundation. The following year, she became the brand ambassador for Swasth Immunised India, a campaign launched by the Network18 Group and Serum Institute of India to promote immunisation for children.

=== Stage performances, radio and television presenting ===
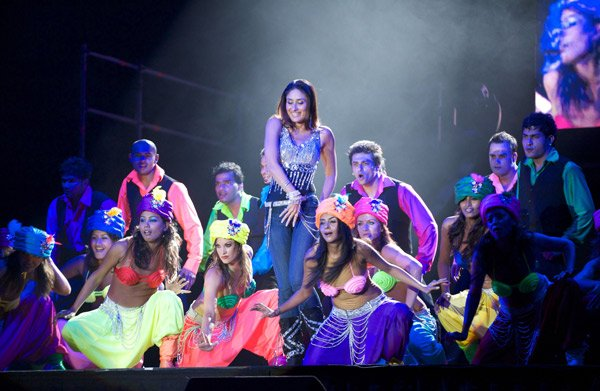
Kapoor performing at Temptation Reloaded in 2008

Kapoor has participated in several stage shows and world tours since 2002. Her first tour (Heartthrobs: Live in Concert (2002) with Hrithik Roshan, Karisma Kapoor, Arjun Rampal and Aftab Shivdasani) was successful in the United States and Canada. At the end of that year, she performed with several other Bollywood stars at Kings Park Stadium in Durban, South Africa in the show Now or Never.

Four years later, Kapoor returned to the stage with six other Bollywood celebrities in the successful Rockstars Concert world tour. The concert was originally scheduled to commence in April 2006, but was postponed due to the arrest of Salman Khan. It later began the following month and was staged in 19 cities across the United Kingdom, the United States and Canada. In 2008, Kapoor performed in Shah Rukh Khan's Temptation Reloaded 2008, a series of concerts in a number of countries. The show (which also featured Arjun Rampal, Katrina Kaif, Ganesh Hegde, Javed Ali and Anusha Dandekar) debuted at the Rotterdam Ahoy venue in Rotterdam, the Netherlands. Several months later she again joined Khan, Rampal and Kaif to perform for an audience of 15,000 at Dubai's Festival City Arena.

In 2018, Kapoor Khan collaborated with Ishq FM to host a radio show "What Women Want". The show was well-received, earning Kapoor Khan a nomination at the New York Festivals Radio Awards for "Best Talk Show Host", and later renewed for three more seasons. The following year, she featured as a talent judge for the seventh season of the dance reality show Dance India Dance.

== Public image ==
Known for her nonchalant relationship with the media, Kapoor has gained a reputation for discussing her private life with no reservations. As a child she regularly attended award ceremonies and events with her family, and would also accompany Karisma on-set during filming. In an interview with Filmfare, she explained that growing up in a film family helped her develop a sense of professionalism and dedication towards her craft. Kapoor's private life has been the subject of media attention in India, with frequent press coverage of her weight and of her relationship with actor Saif Ali Khan. The couple—dubbed "Saifeena" by the entertainment media—has been one of the country's most-reported celebrity stories since 2007, and Kapoor Khan gave birth to their sons in 2016 and 2021.

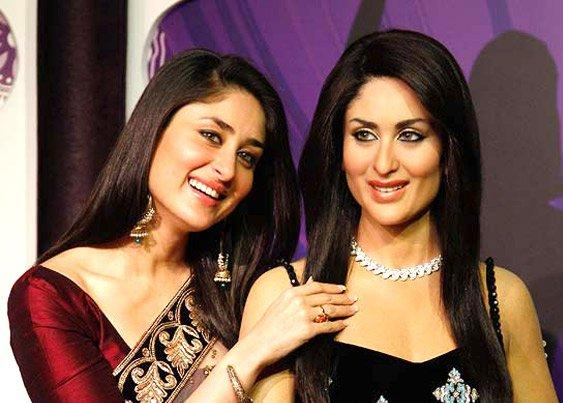
Kapoor with her wax sculpture at Madame Tussauds in 2011

While a segment of the press has described Kapoor as friendly and extremely close to her family, others have criticised her for being arrogant and vain—an image she gained in the wake of her superficial character, Poo, in Kabhi Khushi Kabhie Gham (2001). She subsequently featured in films portraying similar characters, and this further established her off- and on-screen personae. Before the release of Chameli (2004), in which she played a sex worker, Kapoor stated that "there is a certain image that people identify you with [and] [i]t always follows you whichever role you play. I am trying to transgress this image and become more screen-friendly than image-friendly." Chameli helped Kapoor reinvent her on-screen persona, and she later explained that her honesty and openness was often perceived by the media as arrogance.

Kapoor is also known for her assertive and moody nature, and her outspoken views and independence have been singled out for making major contributions to her career. In an early interview, she confessed to being an introvert yet blunt, reasoning: "Total faith and complete belief in myself is my attitude towards life, films and virtually everything else. I am all about doing what I feel is right. It is not easy to pin me down as I can be a bundle of contradictions." Journalist Subhash K. Jha explained that while this approach has sometimes cost her professionally and made her lose out significant projects, it has made her "a favourite among the generation that believes in self-regard being the highest form of creativity". Meanwhile, Anu Ahuja suggested that Kapoor's demeanour is an act; she is "cold and unapproachable so that no one will act funny with her".

Kapoor is considered one of the most popular Bollywood celebrities in India. Her look and performances have established her as a style icon for young women. In a 2009 poll conducted by Daily News and Analysis, Kapoor was voted one of India's most popular icons; with her partner Saif Ali Khan, she was listed amongst the top celebrity endorsers for brands and products worldwide. She became the only Indian actress to be featured on CNNGo's list of "Who Mattered Most in India", and was later selected by Verve for its list of the country's most powerful women from 2008 to 2013 and in 2016. In June 2010, Kapoor was named "India's Most Beautiful Woman" by the Indian edition of People magazine. In 2013, she was selected by India Today for its list of the country's most influential women. In 2024, PVR INOX launched the "Kareena Kapoor Khan Film Festival" to celebrate her 25 years in Hindi cinema, marking the first film festival dedicated to an Indian actress. From 2012 to 2018, Kapoor Khan has featured on Forbes India's "Celebrity 100", a list based on the income and popularity of India's celebrities, peaking at the seventh position in 2012 with an estimated annual earning of ₹735 million (US$7.6 million). As of 2024, Kapoor is India's highest tax-paying female celebrity.

== Artistry and analysis ==
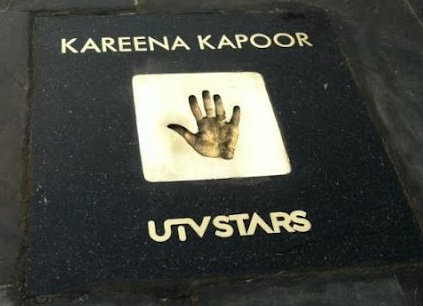
On 28 March 2012, Kapoor inaugurated the Bollywood Walk of the Stars where she received a hand-print of her own.

Kapoor relies on her instincts and spontaneity as an actor. She is known to commit heavily to each role, and refrains from rehearsing for a project. Commenting on this, director Rajkumar Hirani said "I usually have a habit of conducting rehearsals for my actors, but she insisted on not having them as it would affect her spontaneity. She really surprised me with a couple of emotional scenes which we canned in just one take." Karan Johar described Kapoor as a "natural", explaining that "she has no craft, grammar or process attached to her acting [...] It is a great sense of cinema that can keep her going." According to Rensil D'Silva (who directed her in Kurbaan), "Kareena [..] is instinctive and has emotional intelligence. She absorbs the situation and performs accordingly. Discussing the scene, in fact, harms her."

In 2010, Rediff.com noted: "[E]ven though a lot of her starring roles have been forgettable, [a] look at her filmography now, however, would show a more thoughtful selection of roles [...] playing to her strengths." Her portrayal of a series of superficial characters at the start of her career were criticised; film historian Gyan Prakash explained that these roles "tended to infantilise her, packaging her as daddy's little girl, all bubble and no fizz". Critics noted Chameli (2004) as her coming of age, claiming that "a new actor in her was discovered". Following her portrayal of a variety of character types in Chameli, Dev (2004), Omkara (2006) and Jab We Met (2007), Kapoor was noted for her versatility. In 2010, Filmfare magazine included two of her performances—from Omkara and Jab We Met—in its list of "80 Iconic Performances". India Today labelled her "the most versatile female lead in the industry", noting that she "play[s] her roles with trademark spunk".

Manjula Sen of The Telegraph wrote in 2008 that although Kapoor had the worst success ratio among her contemporaries, her marketability remained unaffected. Sen believed Kapoor's strength lies in her being versatile; she is "effortlessly honest in her performances. It is a candour that spills over in her personal conduct." Writing for News18, Rituparna Chatterjee spoke of her transformation to date: "[A]fter 40 films and 10 years of fighting off competition from some of the most versatile actors of her generation, Kareena has matured into a bankable actor reinventing herself with surprising ease." In 2004, Kapoor placed third on Rediff's list of "Top Bollywood Female Stars". She was later ranked seventh and fifth in 2005 and 2006 respectively, and returned to third place in 2007. In January 2011, Kapoor placed fourth on Rediff's list of "Top 10 Actresses of 2000–2010". Kapoor featured in Box Office India's "Top Bollywood Actresses" list for thirteen years, and ranked first for five consecutive years (2007–2011) and in its "All Time Top Actress" list.

== Accolades ==
Kapoor has received six Filmfare Awards out of fifteen nominations. For her role in Refugee, Kapoor was awarded the Best Female Debut in 2000. She earned a special jury recognition for Chameli (2003), and two Critics Award for Best Actress for Dev (2004) and Omkara (2006). Kapoor later received the Best Actress and Best Supporting Actress for Jab We Met (2007) and We Are Family (2010) respectively.

== See also ==
- List of Indian film actresses

== Bibliography ==
- Chatterjee, Saibal; Deenvi, Gulzar; Nihalani, Govind (2003). Encyclopaedia of Hindi Cinema. Popular Prakashan. ISBN 978-81-7991-066-5.
- Dewey, Susan (2008). Making Miss India Miss World: Constructing Gender, Power, and the Nation in Postliberalization India. Syracuse University Press. ISBN 978-0-8156-3176-7.
- Jhunjhunwala, Udita (2012). Patel, Bhaichand (ed.). Bollywood's Top 20: Superstars of Indian Cinema. Penguin Books India. ISBN 978-0-670-08572-9.
