= Heroine (2012 film) =

2012 Indian film by Madhur Bhandarkar

- Theatrical release poster
- Directed by: Madhur Bhandarkar
- Written by: Anuraadha Tewari; Madhur Bhandarkar; Niranjan Iyengar
- Story by: Madhur Bhandarkar
- Produced by: Ronnie Screwvala; Siddharth Roy Kapur; Madhur Bhandarkar
- Starring: Kareena Kapoor; Arjun Rampal; Randeep Hooda
- Cinematography: Mahesh Limaye
- Edited by: Devendra Murudeshwar
- Music by: Salim–Sulaiman
- Production companies: UTV Motion Pictures; Bhandarkar Entertainment
- Distributed by: UTV Motion Pictures
- Release date: 21 September 2012
- Running time: 149 minutes
- Country: India
- Language: Hindi

Heroine (Hindi pronunciation: [ˈɦiːɾoːɪn]) is a 2012 Indian Hindi-language psychological drama film written, directed, and co-produced by Madhur Bhandarkar. The film stars Kareena Kapoor as Mahi Arora, a once-successful film actress whose career is on the decline, alongside Arjun Rampal and Randeep Hooda in supporting roles.

Heroine was released on 21 September 2012 across 2000 screens, coinciding with Kapoor's 32nd birthday. Despite mixed-to-positive reviews from critics, Kapoor's performance received widespread critical acclaim, and is considered to be one of her best performances. Kapoor received a Best Actress nomination at the 58th Filmfare Awards for her performance in the film.

== Plot ==
A journalist reports on the life of Mahi Arora, a renowned film actress, describing her as unstable and problematic, but damaged and lonely due to childhood trauma, and bipolar disorder. Through a flashback, we are shown Mahi's relationship with leading film actor, Aryan Khanna. Aryan is going through a divorce whilst dating Mahi. The couple make a sex tape of themselves. When Mahi learns of an intimate scene Aryan is shooting for a film, she causes a scene on the set, which upsets Aryan. The couple reconciles but Mahi is repeatedly insulted by Aryan's wife. While driving back from a party with Aryan, she raises the topic of his wife, which results in her being thrown out of the car.

Realising her place in Aryan's life, Mahi goes into depression, putting her career in decline. A friend convinces Mahi to leave the past behind her and re-enter the industry so Mahi decides to rejuvenate her career. She employs a public relations manager, Pallavi, who uses sensationalist tactics to reinvent Mahi's image. Mahi starts a relationship with the Vice Captain of the India national cricket team, Angad Paul. Soon, her personal and professional life are stable once again. On the advice of Pallavi, she uses Angad's connections to get a role in a big budget film. The lead actor of the film, Abbas Khan, a married playboy, attempts to initiate an affair with her. She rejects him, which causes him to seek revenge. He demands that the director re-edit the movie so that the story becomes about him and an item girl. Mahi is dissatisfied despite the film being a success, and in a desperate attempt to prove her acting skills, works in a low-budget art film for months. Angad proposes to her but she feels that they should concentrate on their careers. This causes their relationship to end. The art film never completes, and Mahi goes into depression again. She is also denied the opportunity to adopt a child, due to her history of alcoholism and psychiatric problems. Since she cannot get a role in big budget productions, she decides to work on a low-budget film with newcomers.

Mahi meets Aryan at a wedding, and he apologises. The two rekindle their relationship. Aryan says that he wants her to do a big budget film with him, but the director is reluctant to cast her as she has lost her appeal. Mahi becomes obsessed with the thought of losing the role to another heroine. At a poorly attended press conference for an upcoming film, Mahi is mocked by journalists who inform her that the director has cast another actress opposite Aryan. Distraught, Mahi and Pallavi decide to create controversy by leaking the sex tape of her and Aryan. The video becomes a viral sensation and as a result, the low-budget film becomes an instant hit.

After the success of her new film, she gets many new offers, and her career reaches new heights. But she is left distraught after her agent Rashid Bhai, a father figure to her, quits, and Shagufta Rizvi, a veteran actress she respected and admired, dies. At the funeral of Shagufta, she is mauled by the media due to her sex-tape scandal. This leaves her overwhelmed and makes her question her life choices. At the end, Mahi is shown walking alone in Europe, and on being asked if she is Mahi Arora, she replies she is not.

== Cast ==
- Kareena Kapoor as Mahi Arora
- Arjun Rampal as Aryan Khanna
- Randeep Hooda as Angad Paul
- Divya Dutta as Pallavi Narayan
- Govind Namdev as Rashid Bhai
- Helen as Shafguta Rizvi
- Sanjay Suri as Abbas Khan
- Mugdha Godse as Rhea Mehra
- Shahana Goswami as Promotia Roy
- Raqesh Bapat as Sameer Khan
- Pallavi Sharda as Gayatri Sachdeva
- Ranvir Shorey as Tapan Guha
- Lillete Dubey as Mrs. Arora
- Harsh Chhaya as Alex
- Shilpi Sharma as Isha Khanna
- Rashmi Nigam as Zara
- Dilnaz Irani as Tamanna
- Achint Kaur as Mahi's therapist
- Pooja Chopra as Shaheen Khan (Cameo)

== Production ==
=== Development ===
Following the completion of Jail (2009), Bhandarkar began toying with the idea of making a project based on the Hindi film industry. Along with screenwriter Niranjan Iyengar, Bhandarkar began developing the story about the life of an actress and later approached UTV Motion Pictures with whom he had worked on several occasions. Bhandarkar, who was keen on using the title Heroine for his film, donated ₹100,000 (US$1,000) to Guddu Dhanoa's charity. He later explained that he had been subconsciously preparing for the film ever since he joined the industry.

The first look of Heroine was released as part of the 64th Cannes Film Festival. A promotional poster was released during a press conference in which Ronnie Screwvala of UTV Motion Pictures, Aishwarya Rai Bachchan, who was initially chosen as the film's lead, officially announced the film. The director said, "The film is a glamorous yet bold story of the internal journey of a superstar. I am certain it will appeal to audiences across the globe and Rai was a perfect choice for the role. In fact, no one could've played it better." Screwvala stated "With Heroine, we plan to take things to the next level. When you watch the film, you will feel that the role was written with someone as talented and stunning as Aishwarya in mind." The actress too admitted that she was "looking forward to this new journey in the film." It was also announced that Rai will have a wardrobe of more than 40 outfits designed by Manish Malhotra in the film.

Explaining why he was launching the project in Cannes, Screwvala alluded to Rai's star power saying, "She is the brand ambassador for India, and for Indian cinema, when it comes to the French Riviera." The actress was quick to deny any reference to her personal life being portrayed in the movie and said that the entire idea was a result of Bhandarkar's conceptualisation. The official press release distributed as a part of the announcement stated that "The film is based on the life and times of a superstar heroine, Mahi from the dream factory we call 'Bollywood'. The film is a daring, shocking, glamorous, scandalous behind-the-scenes account of the reality behind the world of glitz and glamour that our film stars inhabit. For a country obsessed with films and film stars, Heroine will take audiences on a voyeuristic journey to see what really goes on in the lives of India's sweethearts."

Pre-production was expected to commence during the summer of 2010 but was put on hold due to Kareena Kapoor, who had replaced Rai, having other commitments. During this period, Bhandarkar announced that he would be making another project while putting Heroine on hold. Though speculated to be based on the lives of yesteryear divas like Madhubala and Marilyn Monroe, Bhandarkar denied the reports saying that the film is a "contemporary take which reveals the underbelly of the movie industry and its well-kept secrets". In an attempt to prepare his protagonist for the film, the director prepared a three-hour documentary on Hollywood actresses Marilyn Monroe, Elizabeth Taylor, Ava Gardner and Vivien Leigh. Manish Malhotra was signed as the costume designer. The choreography was handled by Remo D'Souza, Ganesh Acharya and Jasmin Oza.

=== Casting ===
Aishwarya Rai Bachchan, who had initially been cast as the film's lead, was replaced by Kareena Kapoor. Arjun Rampal was cast opposite Kapoor as the male lead in November 2011. Randeep Hooda was cast to play the role of a cricket player. Initially, Arunoday Singh was chosen to play the role but opted out for unknown reasons. Imran Khan, Ranbir Kapoor, and Prateik Babbar were speculated to have replaced Singh, however, Bhandarkar confirmed that Hooda has been selected. To prepare for his role, Hooda took lessons from cricketer Virender Sehwag. Raqesh Bapat was cast in November 2011 to play one of Kapoor's love interests. Divya Dutta, Shahana Goswami, and Shilpi Sharma were cast to play pivotal roles. Helen was cast by Bhandarkar to play a veteran actress. Lillete Dubey was cast to play the role of Kapoor's mother. Ranvir Shorey was confirmed to make a cameo appearance. Mugdha Godse was signed to play one of Kapoor's rivals, marking her third collaboration with Bhandarkar following Fashion (2008), and Jail (2009).

=== Kidnapping and murder of Meenakshi Thappar ===
The production for the film was marred by the kidnapping and brutal murder of Meenakshi Thapar by a co-star, Amit Jaiswal, who like Thapar, only had a minor role in the film. Thapar was strangled in her hotel room in Gorakhpur and had her body dumped into a water tank, with her severed head thrown out of the window of a moving bus.

== Marketing ==
The director initially planned to attach the theatrical trailer to the release of Rowdy Rathore on 1 June 2012. However, there were several matured content featuring Kareena Kapoor, which were essential and must be not be edited out in order to retain the motive of the title of the film, as per the director, Bhandarkar. The Central Board of Film Certification awarded an 'A' certificate to the trailer, but chopped off Kapoor's smoking scenes and lovemaking scenes from the trailer. The trailer was then scheduled for a 6 July 2012 release, as it would be releasing alongside Bol Bachchan, although it was then postponed to 20 July 2012. It was once again delayed so it did not clash with the late Rajesh Khanna's chautha. On 22 July 2012, 2 of the first look posters were revealed on the micro blogging site, Twitter, and received an overwhelming response in just 8 hours of their release.

The trailer of the film was released on 25 July 2012 online and with Kyaa Super Kool Hain Hum on 27 July 2012 in theatres. The trailer crossed over 1 million hits on YouTube within 2 days. After the release of the trailer, a controversy arose. In the film's promo, a dialogue of Kareena Kapoor: "If a heroine buys a car, it's gifted to her by a businessman. If she goes to LA (Los Angeles), she's getting plastic surgery done and, god forbid, if she goes to Dubai, you people make a rate-card for her," was not appreciated by the people of Dubai. To avoid hurting sentiments, director Bhandarkar has had the offending statement censored in the Dubai version. He clarified, "We have censored it. There are some people who have raised objections. But we did not mean to demean anyone, Dubai is my personal favourite city."

=== Game ===
Heroine: The Official Movie Game was released as promotional tie-in mobile video game by Indiagames.

== Music ==
Heroine

Soundtrack album to Heroine by Salim–Sulaiman
- Released: 28 August 2012
- Language: Hindi
- Label: UTV Motion Pictures
- Producer: Salim–Sulaiman

Salim–Sulaiman chronology
Jodi Breakers (2011)	Heroine (2012)	Chakravyuh (2012)

It was announced that music director duo Salim–Sulaiman, who had earlier worked with Madhur Bhandarkar in Fashion (2008), would be composing the soundtrack for Heroine.

During the shooting of the film, Bhandarkar revealed that there would be 2 big item numbers in the film, both to be picturized on the leading lady. One of them, "Halkat Jawani", sung by Sunidhi Chauhan was released as a single track on 17 August 2012.

Track list
No.	Title	Lyrics	Singer(s)	Length
1.	"Halkat Jawani"	Niranjan Iyengar	Sunidhi Chauhan, Indeep Bakshi	04:00
2.	"Tujhpe Fida"	Neelesh Misra	Benny Dayal, Shradha Pandit	05:00
3.	"Khwahishein"	Irfan Siddiqui	Shreya Ghoshal	03:59
4.	"Saiyaan"	Amitabh Bhattacharya	Rahat Fateh Ali Khan	03:32
5.	"Main Heroine Hoon"	Sanjay Chhel	Aditi Singh Sharma, Raftaar	03:30

== Reception ==
=== Box office ===
Domestically the film grossed ₹6.82 crore (US$710,000) on its opening day. Heroine had an average weekend of ₹21.26 crore (US$2.2 million) nett. The film had collected a fair ₹30.09 crore (US$3.1 million) in its first week. Ultimately the film grossed ₹46.15 crore (US$4.8 million) in India and $2,050,000 for a worldwide gross of ₹57.11 crore (US$5.9 million) on a budget of ₹35 crore (US$3.6 million).

=== Critical response ===
Heroine received mixed-to-positive reviews upon release, with most critics praising the story, music and the cast performances, while the screenplay garnered predominantly negative reviews.

On the review aggregator website Rotten Tomatoes reported an approval rating of 30% with an average score of 5.0/10, based on 6 reviews. The website's critical consensus reads, "A brief snapshot of a much bigger picture, this is an interesting film as far as it goes but, like its subject, not all that unusual."

Taran Adarsh of Bollywood Hungama gave the film a rating of 3.5 out of 5 while saying "Watch HEROINE for Bhandarkar's imposing direction, for Kapoor's superlative performance, watch it also for its fearless, inspiring and enlightening storyline divulging the scandalous realities of the movie industry. Try not to miss it!". Shomini Sen of Zee News gave it a score of 3 out of 5 and said "Does Heroine work? Yes, but only because of Kareena Kapoor. From doing the raunchy act in 'Halkat Jawani' to the scenes where she is battling depression and popping pills, Kapoor makes Mahi memorable and lovable. Heroine is absolutely Kapoor's film, not Bhandarkar's. 2 for the film and 1 extra for Bebo! 3 cheers for the film!". Aniruddha Guha of DNA gave Heroine 2 out 5 stars while commenting, "The characters are all caricatured and the screenplay meanders along aimlessly, it being nothing more than an assemblage of scenes – each disjointed from the other – strung together in a long, sleep-inducing and pointless narrative". Saibal Chatterjee of NDTV rated it 2 out of 5 stars, noting "The film that Bhandarkar has made is indeed disappointingly mechanical. Mercifully, Kapoor does demonstrate that she has a feel for the character. But, then, why wouldn't she? After all she plays herself in Heroine".

Rajeev Masand of CNN-IBN rated the film 2 out of 5 and said "Despite an entertaining first-half, thanks to all the unintentional laughs, Heroine slips into a slush of melodrama post-interval. By this point, it feels interminably long and boring". Sukanya Verma of Rediff.com gave it 2 out of 5 stars, remarking "There's nothing innovative about Bhandarkar's Heroine. I am not sure if this is Bhandarkar's idea of comic relief but the hall roared with laughter. What's not funny is just how stunning Kapoor looks or gives to her role as Mahi Arora".

== Nominations ==
58th Filmfare Awards

- Best Actress – Kareena Kapoor

14th IIFA Awards

- Best Actress – Kareena Kapoor
- Best Supporting Actress – Divya Dutta

19th Screen Awards

- Best Actress – Kareena Kapoor

2013 Stardust Awards:

- Actor of the Year – Female – Kareena Kapoor
- Best Actress in a Drama – Kareena Kapoor

8th Apsara Film & Television Producers Guild Awards

- Best Actress – Kareena Kapoor
