= Chameli (film) =

2004 Indian film by Sudhir Mishra

- Film poster
- Directed by: Sudhir Mishra
- Written by: Anant Balani; Swanand Kirkire
- Produced by: Pritish Nandy; Rangita Pritish Nandy
- Starring: Kareena Kapoor; Rahul Bose
- Cinematography: Aseem Bajaj
- Edited by: Ranjeet Bahadur
- Music by: Songs: Sandesh Shandilya; Background Score: Vanraj Bhatia
- Production company: Pritish Nandy Communications
- Release date: 9 January 2004
- Running time: 108 minutes
- Country: India
- Language: Hindi

Chameli (transl. Jasmine) is a 2004 Indian Hindi-language film directed by Sudhir Mishra. The story revolves around a prostitute and an investment banker spending a night together. It stars Kareena Kapoor and Rahul Bose. This was Rinke Khanna's final film before her retirement after marriage.

The film was remade as Jabilamma (2008) in Telugu with Navneet Kaur and Rajeev Kanakala.

== Plot ==
Aman Kapoor is a wealthy investment banker, whose pregnant wife, Neha was killed in a car accident more than a decade ago. The incident left him depressed and lonely. Forced to engage in social events, he reluctantly hosts a party. The stormy weather puts Aman in a pensive mood, and he decides to go home. While driving, his car breaks down on a flooded road and his phone battery dies. He takes refuge in an alleyway where he meets Chameli, a street-smart prostitute, with the story taking place all in the course of one dark rainy stormy night.

Chameli offers Aman a match for his cigarette, and he is initially repulsed by her after she propositions him. Aman's presence scares off a potential customer, and he offers to pay for her missed wages, which Chameli declines. Soon, two police officers arrive, looking for their bribe. They begin to manhandle Chameli, which aggravates Aman, who is then intimidated by the officers. Chameli defuses the situation, and Aman's attitude towards her softens after the pair begin a conversation about their lives. The discussion is interrupted by Johnny, a young boy selling coffee and cigarettes. Chameli is familiar with him, paying his school fees and looking after his health. He promises to come back with a mechanic to fix Aman's car. Chameli then attends to Raja, an unstable young man who has stolen Rs 50,000 from his father. Raja is in love with Haseena, and is convinced that she has run off to become a prostitute. Chameli consoles and advises him, and then takes him away. Haseena, a trans woman, arrives and playfully propositions Aman. Chameli returns and advises Haseena to run away with Raja to another city with the money. Raja's homophobic father arrives to look for them, but he leaves when he realises they are not there. Each incident further develops the friendship between Chameli and Aman.

Chameli's pimp, Usman, has rented her out to Naik, a brutish local politician who has a reputation for injuring prostitutes and is also carrying an STD (sexually transmitted disease), hence Chameli does not want to go to him, as she does not want to contract an STD like a fellow prostitute that she knows. Naik's henchmen seek Chameli out, and the pair manages to escape and go to a local bar to talk to Usman. Chameli reveals that she cannot free herself from her pimp because she still owes him money which she borrowed. At the bar, Aman offers to pay off Chameli's debt in exchange for her not having to entertain Naik. At the ATM Usman demands more money, threatening Aman with a knife, and the pimp is stabbed in the ensuing scuffle. Aman and Chameli are picked up by the police, and his temperament causes him to be placed in a holding cell. Chameli convinces the officers to allow Aman to make a call, and he speaks to a friend who has connections with the Assistant Commissioner of Police K.P. Singh. Singh listens to Aman's story and decides to withdraw the police protection over Usman, who became an informant after being arrested. Chameli tells Aman that the withdrawal of protection means that Usman and his family are now vulnerable to being killed by other, more dangerous criminals. Singh reluctantly agrees to continue protecting Usman. At the hospital, Singh forces Usman to call Naik, and the ACP threatens him, eventually convincing Naik to leave Chameli alone.

As they leave the hospital, Chameli playfully teases Aman about how his wife will react to the situation. Aman breaks down and tells her about the accident, adding that it is his fault that she died since he chose to drive in heavy rains. As dawn breaks, Aman finally returns home, a changed man. The highly eventful night has altered his outlook on life and allowed him to come to terms with his loss. He reconnects with his father-in-law, whom he had avoided since his wife's death. After some time, he returns to see and meet Chameli again.

== Cast ==
- Kareena Kapoor as Chameli
- Rahul Bose as Aman Kapoor
- Rinke Khanna as Neha Kapoor: Aman's wife
- Shahil Raichand
- Yashpal Sharma as K.P. Singh
- Satyajit Sharma as Police Inspector
- Pankaj Jha as Usman Bilal
- Kabir Sadanand as Haseena Khan
- Makrand Deshpande as Taxi driver
- Tarun Shukla as Corporator's man
- Mahek Chahal (special performance in "Sajana ve Sajana")

== Production ==
Chameli was first offered to actress Amisha Patel, who then refused to do the film and said the role of a prostitute will not match her character. The role then went to Kareena Kapoor, which marked a turning point in her career. The film began production in August 2003. The director of the film, Anant Balani, died on 28 August 2003. The film was almost shelved when Pritish Nandy called Sudhir Mishra to direct the film. Mishra completed the film with a different script.

== Soundtrack ==
Chameli

Soundtrack album by Sandesh Shandilya
- Released: 8 December 2003
- Genre: Feature film soundtrack
- Label: T-Series
- Producer: Rangita Pritish Nandy

Sandesh Shandilya chronology
Aitraaz (2004)	Chameli (2003)	Kaal (2005)

The songs are composed by Sandesh Shandilya and lyrics are penned by Irshad Kamil and Prof. R. N. Dubey.

Song	Singer(s)	Notes	Duration
"Bhaage Re Mann"	Sunidhi Chauhan	Picturised on Kareena Kapoor and Rahul Bose	5:33
"Sajna Ve Sajna"	Sunidhi Chauhan	Picturised on Mahek Chahal and Kareena Kapoor	3:57
"Sajna Ve Sajna 2"	Sunidhi Chauhan		3:57
"Jane Kyon Humko" - Female	Sunidhi Chauhan		4:23
"Jaane Kyon Humko" - Duet (Version 1)	Sunidhi Chauhan and Javed Ali		4:33
"Jaane Kyon Humko" - Duet (Version 2)	Sunidhi Chauhan & Udit Narayan		4:33
"Yeh Lamha"	Sunidhi Chauhan	Picturised on Chitrangada Singh and Rahul Bose	4:08
"Soul Of Chameli"	(instrumental)		4:09

== Reception ==
Anupama Chopra wrote that "InChameli [sic], he [Sudhir Mishra] takes the late director Anant Balani's idea of a one-night encounter between a prostitute and an investment banker and creates a poignant portrait of urban lives. Taran Adarsh wrote that "On the whole, CHAMELI does not deliver. At the box-office, the film caters to a niche audience but in view of the fact that the film lacks a solid script to keep the viewer hooked, even that segment of viewers may not take to it whole-heartedly". Saumya Roy of Outlook wrote that "There is a good vibe between Bose and Kareena that makes the movie watchable". Chinmayee Manjunath from Deccan Herald opined, "But be warned — high expectations will be shattered".

== Awards ==
Filmfare Awards

- Best Cinematography - Aseem Bajaj
- Special Award for Best Performance - Kareena Kapoor

IIFA Awards

- Best Cinematography - Aseem Bajaj
