= Dev (2004 film) =

Indian drama film

- Poster
- Directed by: Govind Nihalani
- Written by: G.P. Deshpande; Nida Fazli; Govind Nihalani; Meenakshi Sharma
- Produced by: Govind Nihalani
- Starring: Amitabh Bachchan; Fardeen Khan; Kareena Kapoor; Om Puri; Amrish Puri; Rati Agnihotri
- Cinematography: Govind Nihalani
- Edited by: Deepa Bhatia
- Music by: Aadesh Shrivastava
- Production companies: Udbhav Dreamzone; Applause Entertainment Pvt. Ltd.; Entertainment One
- Distributed by: Udbhav Dreamzone
- Release date: 11 June 2004
- Running time: 176 minutes
- Country: India
- Language: Hindi

Dev is a 2004 Indian Hindi-language crime drama film directed, co-written and produced by Govind Nihalani. The film stars Amitabh Bachchan, Fardeen Khan and Kareena Kapoor. It was released on 11 June 2004.

== Plot ==
Joint Commissioner of Police Dev Pratap Singh, a duty-bound, self-righteous officer, and Special Commissioner Tejinder Khosla, the balancing force between the political interests of Chief Minister Bhandarker and Dev's commitment to the law, are lifelong friends, each with his own ideals. Farhaan, a law graduate, was brought up with ideals of non-violence and patriotism. Dev unwittingly gives Farhaan the wound that plunges him into rage and violence after witnessing the death of his father during a peace demonstration. Taking advantage of the situation, corrupt politician Latif sets the vulnerable young man on a path of violence and destruction that threatens to ignite the city. Aaliya is the light in Farhaan's life. Beautiful and innocent, the young woman also gets caught in extraordinary circumstances that transform her life, and she dares to stand up for the truth.

On a train bound for Bombay from Surat, a police inspector questions a young man named Farhaan, who has just obtained his law degree, for his reason to go to Bombay and whether he has any alliance with Pakistanis. Farhaan answers that he is going to Bombay to live with his father, and he does not know anyone from Pakistan. Farhaan finds out that Bombay Police have been targeting the Muslim community and, in the name of fighting terrorism, have been killing innocent Muslim men, women, and children. He discovers that Joint Commissioner of Police, Dev Pratap Singh, is involved in this witch hunt, and he would like to kill him. Farhaan joins hands with the local Muslim political leader, Latif, and is provided training in handling guns and is subsequently made ready for this task. Unfortunately, Farhaan is unable to kill Dev, who escapes unhurt, albeit a little shaken. Chief Minister Bhandarker views this incident seriously and instructs the police to root out terrorist elements in the city, which they do so ruthlessly. Farhaan is told to deliver a package to a man near a Hindu temple, and he does so. While at a stop to buy some snacks, the package explodes, killing several people. Since this incident occurred near a Hindu temple, a right-wing political party member, Mangal Rao, had organized riots against the Muslim community. Riots take place, and the police are instructed to observe and not prevent the violence. As a result, hundreds are killed. Latif organizes his men to target and attack Hindus and Hindu establishments, rendering the region unsafe, with people being killed in the name of religion. When Hindus and Muslims have had enough, they publicly ask for peace. It is only then that Latif and Mangal Rao agree on a truce, on the condition that no Muslim male, female, or child will file an FIR (First Information Report) in any police station, to which Latif agrees. Latif then warns everyone in the Muslim community not to complain against anyone. It is then Farhaan finds out that he has been treated as a pawn by Latif, and decides to trust Dev and become an informer.

== Cast ==
- Amitabh Bachchan as JCP Dev Pratap Singh
- Kareena Kapoor as Aaliya
- Fardeen Khan as Farhaan Ali
- Om Puri as Special Commissioner Tejinder Khosla
- Amrish Puri as Chief Minister Bhandarker
- Ehsan Khan as Latif Bhai
- Rati Agnihotri as Dr. Bharati Singh
- Milind Gunaji as Mangal Rao
- Pramod Moutho as Ali Khan
- Amruta Subhash as Qureshi
- Rajesh Tailang as ACP Waman Bhonsle

== Critical reception ==
Taran Adarsh of Bollywood Hungama gave the film 2/5 stars and said "On the whole, DEV is a realistic fare that may appeal to a select few, but those looking for escapist cinema will be sorely disappointed".

== Awards ==
50th Filmfare Awards

Won:

- Best Film (Critics) – Govind Nihalani
- Best Actress (Critics) – Kareena Kapoor

== Soundtrack ==
The film's soundtrack was composed by Aadesh Shrivastava, with lyrics written by Nida Fazli and Govind Nihalani.

Dev

Film score by Aadesh Shrivastava
- Released: 2004
- Genre: Film soundtrack
- Language: Hindi
- Label: Times Music

Aadesh Shrivastava chronology
Baghban (2003)	Dev (2004)	Deewaar: Let's Bring Our Heroes Home (2004)

No.	Title	Singer(s)	Length
1.	"Mangalam Ganesham"	Abhijeet Bhattacharya	4:32
2.	"Rang Deeni"	Kailash Kher, Mahua Kamat, Shraddha Pandit	4:51
3.	"Allahu"	Aadesh Shrivastava, Asha Bhosle	6:27
4.	"Tujh Sang Bandhi Dor"	Sonu Nigam	4:35
5.	"Jab Nahin Aaye The Tum"	Vijayta Pandit, Kareena Kapoor	4:05
6.	"Dev Speaks"	Amitabh Bachchan	3:07
