= The Buckingham Murders =

2023 Indian film by Hansal Mehta

- Theatrical release poster
- Directed by: Hansal Mehta
- Screenplay by: Aseem Arrora; Raghav Raj Kakker; Kashyap Kapoor
- Story by: Aseem Arrora
- Produced by: Shobha Kapoor; Ekta Kapoor; Kareena Kapoor Khan
- Starring: Kareena Kapoor Khan; Keith Allen; Ranveer Brar
- Cinematography: Emma Dalesman
- Edited by: Amitesh Mukherjee
- Music by: Score: Ketan Sodha; Night Song Records; Songs: Bally Sagoo; Payal Dev; Karan Kulkarni
- Production companies: Balaji Motion Pictures; Mahana Films; Miracle Pictures
- Distributed by: Pen Marudhar Entertainment
- Release dates: 14 October 2023 (London); 13 September 2024 (India)
- Running time: 107 minutes
- Country: India
- Languages: English; Hindi
- Box office: est. ₹14.56 crore

The Buckingham Murders is a 2023 Indian crime thriller film directed by Hansal Mehta and starring Kareena Kapoor Khan as a grieving British-Indian detective who is assigned the case of a murdered child in Buckinghamshire. It is written by Aseem Arrora, Raghav Raj Kakker, and Kashyap Kapoor and produced by Kareena Kapoor Khan, Shobha Kapoor and Ekta Kapoor.

The film had its world premiere at the 67th BFI London Film Festival on 14 October 2023. It was theatrically released on 13 September 2024 to generally positive reviews from critics. It received five nominations at 70th Filmfare Awards including Best Film (Critics) and Best Actress (Critics) (Kapoor).

== Plot ==
Jasmeet "Jass" Bhamra, a British-Indian detective, is grieving the death of her son, who was killed by a drug-addicted shooter. She takes a transfer to High Wycombe in Buckinghamshire, where she is assigned the case of a missing Indian boy, Ishpreet, by Superintendent Miller. With her superior, DI Hardik "Hardy" Patel, she interviews Ishpreet's parents, Daljeet and Preeti Kohli, whose marriage is suffering, and learns the boy was adopted. Jass also discovers that Patel has history with the family, particularly with their relative, who is a former drug dealer.

Via CCTV footage, the police locate Ishpreet's last-known location at a park, where they begin an overnight search. At dawn, Patel tells his tired team to go home and ventures into the park with his subordinate, Simon. They discover Ishpreet's dead body in an abandoned car. The police trace the car to a Muslim man, whose nephew, Saquib, is seen borrowing the car on the day of the murder. He is revealed to be a drug-addict, and also has history with Patel. On further investigation, they find that Saquib was with the local Imam's son, Naved, on that day. During his interview, Naved reveals that Saquib killed Ishpreet (who was delivering cocaine to them) in a fit of rage. Saquib is arrested, but Jass is unconvinced. She tries to reason with Patel and Miller, but when Patel taunts her for losing her son, she punches him. Miller puts her off the case.

Jass, now given a desk job, is still quietly investigating the murder. She discovers that Patel has a sister who is in a coma due to drugs supplied to her by Saquib. She visits Saquib in prison, pleading with him to tell her the truth. He reveals that he did indeed get into an altercation with Ishpreet, but did not kill him. He also says that Naved and him are lovers. Jass pleads with a closeted Naved, saying that his testimony will lead to life imprisonment for Saquib. Disturbed, Naved reveals that he struck a deal with Patel, who said that Saquib would be released in a couple of years if he lied about the murder. Jass uses this information to reveal Patel's truth to Miller, but Patel shoots and kills himself instead.

Saquib is released from prison. Jass focusses on Daljeet as the new prime suspect. His transportation business is not doing well and he is broke, and had taken out a large life insurance on Ishpreet's name. They find that he is seemingly having an affair with a woman named Indrani, and that he is physically abusive towards Preeti. However, Indrani is revealed to be Daljeet's sponsor who he met at a support group after losing his mother to COVID. Meanwhile, Daljeet's relative Prithvi is seen making sexual advances on Preeti. Daljeet witnesses this, and in a fit of rage, murders him.

When arrested, Daljeet vehemently denies killing his adoptive son. On searching Prithvi's house, police discover Ishpreet's missing backpack among his belongings and a burner phone with which he was dealing drugs. They trace a call made on it to Preeti, who is revealed to be the mastermind all along to escape from her abusive marriage, resenting how she was forced into the role of a housewife and mother. She had seduced Prithvi and manipulated him into killing Ishpreet, and also orchestrated the event where Daljeet would murder Prithvi. Having closed the case, a traumatised Jass tries to get closure on her own son's death.

== Cast ==
- Kareena Kapoor Khan as Jasmeet "Jass" Bhamra
- Keith Allen as Miller
- Ranveer Brar as Daljeet Kohli
- Prabhleen Sandhu as Preeti Kohli
- Sarah-Jane Dias as Indrani Rai
- Manish Gandhi as Prithvi
- Ash Tandon as DI Hardik Patel
- Kapil Redekar as Saquib Chaudhary
- Rahul Sidhu as Naved
- Sanjeev Mehra as Kamalpreet Bhamra
- Jonathan Nyati as DS Cowden
- Darren Kemp as DS Simon Clark
- Charles Craddock as James Thomas
- Rukku Nahar as Harleen
- Haqi Ali as Imam
- Adwoa Akoto as DS Sharon Mark

== Production ==
The film marked Kareena Kapoor Khan's first production venture; she produced it alongside Ekta Kapoor and Shobha Kapoor. She said that her role in the film was inspired by Kate Winslet's character in the miniseries Mare of Easttown.

The film is in English and Hindi, with 80% of the dialogues in English. It had predominantly British supporting actors, including Keith Allen.

== Music ==
The soundtrack is composed by Bally Sagoo, Payal Dev and Karan Kulkarni. The lyrics are written by Shellee, Niren Bhatt, Kunaal Vermaa and Devshi Khanduri.

Track listing
No.	Title	Lyrics	Music	Singer(s)	Length
1.	"Sada Pyaar Tut Gaya"	Devshi Khanduri	Bally Sagoo	Vicky Marley	4:09
2.	"Yaad Reh Jaati Hai"	Kunaal Vermaa	Payal Dev	B Praak	4:14
3.	"Halki Khanak Si"	Shellee	Karan Kulkarni	Rekha Bhardwaj	3:40

== Release ==
=== Theatrical ===
The Buckingham Murders premiered at the 67th BFI London Film Festival on 14 October 2023. It served as the opening film for the 2023 Mumbai Film Festival at the Nita Mukesh Ambani Cultural Centre on 27 October. The film was theatrically released on 13 September 2024.

Mehta revealed that the film will mark the first part of a planned franchise.

=== Home media ===
The film premiered on Netflix from 8 November 2024.

== Reception ==
The Buckingham Murders received positive reviews from critics and audiences. On the review aggregator website Rotten Tomatoes, 79% of 14 critics' reviews are positive, with an average rating of 6.7/10.

Lachmi Deb Roy of the Firstpost rated 4/5 and stated in her review that "It is immersive, engaging and edgy, Hansal Mehta’s directorial and Kareena Kapoor Khan starrer The Buckingham Murders is a must watch not only for bereaved parents, but for all. The sharp silence of the film makes it all the more gripping." Zinia Bandyopadhyay of India Today gave 4 stars out of 5 and stated in her review that "It is a beautifully-made film with brilliant performances. If you love a well-made thriller with a compelling story and layered narrative, this one is a must-watch". Renuka Vyavahare of Times of India gave it a rating of 3.5 out of 5 and wrote, "This may not be an edge-of-your-seat, hard-hitting crime thriller as you expect it to be, but its understanding and expression of grief, isolation and repressed anger is noteworthy".

Saibal Chatterjee of NDTV gave the film a rating of 3 out of 5, writing that Kareena Kapoor Khan "nails her role with admirable felicity". Sukanya Verma of Rediff gave the film 3 out of 5 stars, noting that "Kareena's sombre performance lingered on long after I had left the theater; her muted struggle as a woman haunted by the devastating loss of her young child and stoic leadership as a detective investigating the case of a missing kid reiterate her command of the art". Devesh Sharma of Filmfare gave 3.5 stars out of 5 and stated that "The Buckingham Murders is a slow-burning police drama set in England. Kareena Kapoor Khan shines in the role of an investigating police officer." A critic from Bollywood Hungama gave 2 out of 5 stars and wrote "The Buckingham Murders is a lacklustre murder mystery." Shubhra Gupta of The Indian Express gave 2.5 stars out of 5 but praised the performance of the lead actor saying "Kareena Kapoor Khan raises the bar, and her presence alone makes everyone else a clear supporting character."

Writing for Film Companion, Sahir Avik D'Souza considered the film to be an "unflashy police procedural drama" anchored by a strong central performance from Kareena Kapoor Khan, whom he found "believable in a world far removed from her previous work". However, he considered the film's murder mystery to be "without bite". Rishabh Suri of Hindustan Times writes in his review of this film that "Kareena Kapoor is the heartbeat of this film; she has the right amount of pain and anger." Anuj Kumar of The Hindu observes that "it is an intriguing murder mystery layered with apposite social commentary and a fast-paced thriller that makes us reflect on the social churn." He also wrote that "It is taut, tense, and tragic, director Hansal Mehta turns a formula into a formidable experience with a superb Kareena Kapoor Khan in tow."

== Accolades ==
Year	Award	Category	Nominee/Work	Result	Ref.
2025	70th Filmfare Awards	Best Film (Critics)	Hansal Mehta	Nominated	
2025	70th Filmfare Awards	Best Actress (Critics)	Kareena Kapoor Khan	Nominated	
2025	70th Filmfare Awards	Best Background Score	Ketan Sodha, Night Song Records	Nominated	
2025	70th Filmfare Awards	Best Cinematography	Emma Dalesman	Nominated	
2025	70th Filmfare Awards	Sound Design	Mandar Kulkarni	Nominated	
