= Fida =

2004 Indian film by Ken Ghosh

- Theatrical release poster
- Directed by: Ken Ghosh
- Written by: Kiran Kotrial (dialogues)
- Screenplay by: Lalit Mahajan; Sunny Mahajan
- Story by: Lalit Mahajan; Sunny Mahajan
- Produced by: Ramesh Taurani; Kumar Taurani
- Starring: Fardeen Khan; Kareena Kapoor; Shahid Kapoor; Kim Sharma; Akhilendra Mishra
- Cinematography: Amit Roy
- Edited by: V. N. Mayekar
- Music by: Songs: Anu Malik; Background Score: Raju Singh
- Production company: Tips Music Films
- Distributed by: Tips Industries
- Release date: 20 August 2004
- Running time: 120 minutes
- Country: India
- Language: Hindi
- Budget: ₹10 crore
- Box office: ₹16.9 crore

Fida (translation: Infatuated) is a 2004 Indian Hindi-language romantic action thriller film directed by Ken Ghosh, starring Fardeen Khan, Kareena Kapoor, Shahid Kapoor and Akhilendra Mishra. The film was released on 20 August 2004.

== Plot ==
The film starts with someone emptying the bank accounts of many people, including Babu Anna, an underworld don, via an Internet theft. The police are clueless about the robber, and Anna wants revenge. Desperately wanting his money back, Anna assigns his men to find that hacker.

The film then shifts to a young man named Jai Malhotra who lives with his best friend, Sonia. One day he sees a woman named Neha Mehra and falls madly in love with her instantly. At first, Neha rejects Jai's advances and this causes him to attempt suicide and prior to that he carves "I love you Neha" on his hand with a knife. After Sonia chastises Neha regarding Jai's actions, she then falls for him too. Sonia, who’s secretly in love with Jai, becomes heartbroken and leaves for London to see the suitors for her marriage.

One day, Jai sees Neha trying to hang herself after getting a phone call. She tells him that her deceased father owed a huge amount of money to Babu Anna's underworld. To repay the amount, he became part of a gang of hackers who were responsible for Internet thefts. After his death, Babu's Anna underworld began pursuing Neha to recover the money. Jai and Neha try to sell their apartments to get enough money, to no avail. A visit from a client leads Jai to consider robbing a bank to get the necessary money. At a bank, Jai spots a rich man named Vikram Singh withdrawing a huge sum of money and instead decides to steal from him. However, Vikram catches Jai during his attempt to break into his house.

Instead of reporting Jai to the police, Vikram demands an explanation for his actions. Upon learning the whole story, Vikram reveals that he is the hacker behind the internet thefts but agrees to help Jai. In return, Jai has to take the blame for the thefts. Jai agrees, gives the money to Neha, and turns himself in. Jai is escorted by police for the trial, but Anna has his men intercept them to kidnap Jai. A shootout ensues between the gang and police as Jai is able to escape and runs to Neha's apartment, only to find both Neha and Vikram together in the shower. He is horrified to learn that they conspired against him to steal all the money, and Neha's love was just a ruse to con him to take a fall.

Jai escapes from the apartment but is shot in the train by a police officer. He falls off the railway bridge into a river and is presumed dead. Two months later, Neha and Vikram start getting anonymous phone calls. Neha believes that the calls are from Jai and that he is still alive. Jai, who is very much alive, is bent on revenge on both Neha and Vikram. He stays at Sonia's place and reveals how he escaped from the river and entered a ship and was in for 2 months conspiring how to make Neha and Vikram's lives hell.

One day, Vikram finds Neha hanging by her neck in the toilet, and Neha confirms that Jai is alive. Vikram, out of rage, tracks Jai down and severely beats him up, threatening to murder him if he comes back into their lives again. Vikram then reports Jai to Babu Anna, thus giving him a whiff of the affair. This does not deter Jai, as he later blackmails Vikram by kidnapping Neha, forcing him to turn himself in. Vikram obliges and is led to Neha; however, all three are intercepted and taken hostage by Babu Anna and his gang, demanding all his money from them. Jai cleverly deflects Anna and forces Vikram to transfer Anna's money back into his account. Catching them off guard, Jai and Vikram finish Anna and his gang.

In the melee, Vikram has Jai cornered, but Jai finally overpowers him. However, Neha strikes Jai hard from behind, allowing Vikram to gun Jai down. Vikram and Neha mock Jai as they watch him struggle with his fatal injuries. Jai stuns the two by rising with Babu Anna's gun and shooting Neha in the forehead, killing her instantly, to Vikram's horror. Enraged, Jai collapses and boasts about settling the score for once while finally succumbing to his injuries, leaving Vikram alone to grieve over Neha's corpse. Later, a news report reveals that somebody has made a very generous donation to the Missionary Charity Fund, while Vikram is shown heading out in a boat. It is implied that Vikram gave away all of Babu Anna's money to charity, as he no longer has any good use for it.

== Cast ==
- Fardeen Khan as Vikram Singh
- Kareena Kapoor as Neha Verma
- Shahid Kapoor as Jai Malhotra
- Kim Sharma as Sonia Mukherjee
- Akhilendra Mishra as Babu Anna
- Viju Khote as a Potential buyer
- Dinesh Hingoo as a Real estate agent
- Vivek Vaswani as a Bank employee

== Music ==
Fida

Soundtrack album by Anu Malik
- Released: 25 July 2004
- Genre: Feature film soundtrack
- Length: 34:00
- Label: Tips Music Films

The soundtrack was composed by Anu Malik, with lyrics written by Sameer.

Udit Narayan and Sonu Nigam supplied vocals for Shahid Kapoor and Fardeen Khan, respectively. Kareena Kapoor and Shahid Kapoor lent their voices for the track "Aaja Ve Maahi".

According to the Box Office India, with around 14,00,000 units sold, this film's soundtrack album was the year's tenth highest-selling.

#	Title	Singer(s)
1.	"Nazar Nazar"	Udit Narayan, Sapna Mukherjee
2.	"Aaja Ve Mahi"	Udit Narayan, Alka Yagnik, Shahid Kapoor, Kareena Kapoor
3.	"Dil Mere Naa"	Udit Narayan, Alka Yagnik
4.	"Aaj Kaho Sanam Jitna"	Kumar Sanu, Alka Yagnik
5.	"Maine Jisko Chaaha"	Sonu Nigam, Alisha Chinai
6.	"Nazar Nazar"	(Instrumental)

== Reception ==
Taran Adarsh of Bollywood Hungama gave the film 2 out of 5 stars, writing "On the whole, FIDA has thrilling moments, but not enough to entice you completely. At the box-office, the film will find the going tough after the initial euphoria settles. Mainly a big city film, its prospects should be better at multiplexes." Anupama Chopra writing for India Today stated "Eventually, the novelty palls and the plot plods: the climax, in which Kareena is hanging from a bell, is both dated and ridiculous."

Shilpa Bharatan-Iyer of Rediff.com gave the film a positive review, writing "Fida has its share of incongruities. But having said that, let me add Fida is definitely paisa vasool! (a common Hindi phrase meaning "value for money")."
