= Sushmita Sen filmography =

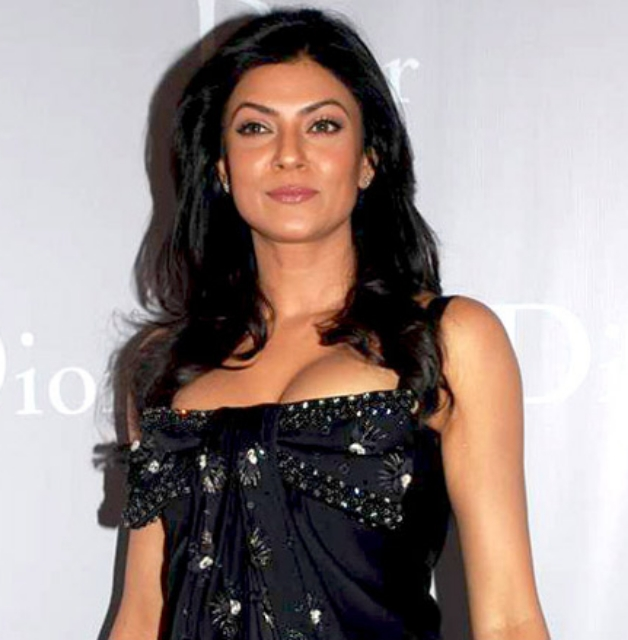
Sen in 2010

Sushmita Sen is an Indian actress known for her work in Hindi cinema and two Tamil films. She made her debut in 1996 with Mahesh Bhatt's thriller Dastak. She then starred in the Tamil-language romantic action film Ratchagan (1997). In 1999, Sen won the Filmfare Award for Best Supporting Actress for her portrayal of a model in David Dhawan's critically and commercially successful comedy-drama Biwi No.1. Her next release was the musical drama Sirf Tum the same year. The film earned her critical appreciation and was financially successful. She also attained commercial recognition for her performance of the song "Dilbar". She had two releases in 2001: fantasy comedy film Kyo Kii... Main Jhuth Nahin Bolta and romantic drama Bas Itna Sa Khwaab Hai. Both films failed to create an impact at the box office.

In 2002, Sen appeared in Meghna Gulzar's Filhaal..., a film on the theme of surrogacy. In 2003, she played the role of a policewoman in the thriller Samay: When Time Strikes. It proved to be a critical success earning Sen appreciation for her performance. In the same year, she starred in the ensemble heist film Aankhen which was the fifth highest-grossing Hindi film of that year. Her biggest hit of 2004 was Farah Khan's Main Hoon Na, in which she played the role of a chemistry teacher. The same year she appeared in the horror film Vaastu Shastra. She gained further recognition by featuring in the 2005 romantic comedy Maine Pyaar Kyun Kiya? Inspired by a French play, Fleur de cactus, it emerged as one of the highest-grossing Hindi films of the year. In the same year Sen acted in the drama Main Aisa Hi Hoon, a remake of the Hollywood film I Am Sam.

Sen then appeared in the Bengali–English film It Was Raining That Night, which would have been her debut role in both of these languages, but it did not get a theatrical release. Kalpana Lajmi's Chingaari (2006) and Tanuja Chandra's Zindaggi Rocks (2006) in which she played a lead role, performed badly at the box office. Sen continued to star in a series of films that did not do well commercially, including action drama Ram Gopal Varma Ki Aag (2007), romantic drama Karma Aur Holi (2009), romantic comedy Dulha Mil Gaya (2010) and action comedy No Problem (2010). After taking a career break for five years, Sen appeared in her first Bengali film Nirbaak, directed by Srijit Mukherji in 2015. In 2020, she made her television debut by playing the title role in Ram Madhvani's Aarya. Her role as a housewife forced into the narcotics trade was well received by the critics.

== Films ==
Key
†	Denotes films that have not yet been released

- All films are in Hindi, unless otherwise noted.

Year	Film	Role(s)	Notes	Ref(s)
1996	Dastak	Herself		
1997	Ratchagan	Sonia Devi Sriram	Tamil film	
1998	Zor	Aarti		
1999	Sirf Tum	Neha		
1999	Hindustan Ki Kasam	Priya		
1999	Biwi No.1	Rupali Walia	Filmfare Award for Best Supporting Actress	
1999	Mudhalvan	Herself	Tamil film Special appearance in the song "Shakalaka Baby"	
2000	Aaghaaz	Sudha		
2000	Fiza	Reshma	Special appearance in the song "Mehboob Mere"	
2001	Kyo Kii... Main Jhuth Nahin Bolta	Sonam Singh		
2001	Nayak	Herself	Special appearance in the song "Shakalaka Baby"	
2001	Bas Itna Sa Khwaab Hai	Lara Oberoi		
2002	Aankhen	Neha Srivastav		
2002	Tumko Na Bhool Paayenge	Mehak		
2002	Filhaal...	Sia Sheth		
2003	Samay: When Time Strikes	ACP Malvika Chauhan		
2003	Praan Jaye Par Shaan Na Jaye	Sushmita	Also narrator	
2004	Vaastu Shastra	Dr. Jhilmil Rao		
2004	Main Hoon Na	Chandni Chopra		
2004	Paisa Vasool	Baby		
2005	Maine Pyaar Kyun Kiya?	Naina Kapoor		
2005	Main Aisa Hi Hoon	Neeti Khanna		
2005	Bewafaa	Aarti Verma Sahai		
2005	Kisna: The Warrior Poet	Naima Begum	Special appearance in the song "Chilman Uthegi Nahin"	
2006	Chingaari	Basanti		
2006	Zindaggi Rocks	Kriya Sengupta		
2006	Alag	Herself	Special appearance in the song "Sabse Judaa Sabse"	
2007	Ram Gopal Varma Ki Aag	Durga Devi		
2009	Karma Aur Holi	Meera Kohli		
2009	Do Knot Disturb	Kiran Saxena		
2010	Dulha Mil Gaya	Shimmer Kanhai		
2010	No Problem	Kajal/Kamini		
2015	Nirbaak		Bengali film	

== Television ==
Year	Title	Role(s)	Ref(s)
2008	Ek Khiladi Ek Haseena	Judge	
2015	Comedy Superstars	Judge	
2017	Kapuso Mo, Jessica Soho	Herself	
2020	Myntra Fashion Superstar	Judge	
2020–2024	Aarya	Aarya Sareen	
2023	Taali	Gauri Sawant	
