= Zee Cine Award for Best Actor in a Supporting Role – Female =

Hindi film award

Zee Cine Award for Best Supporting Actress
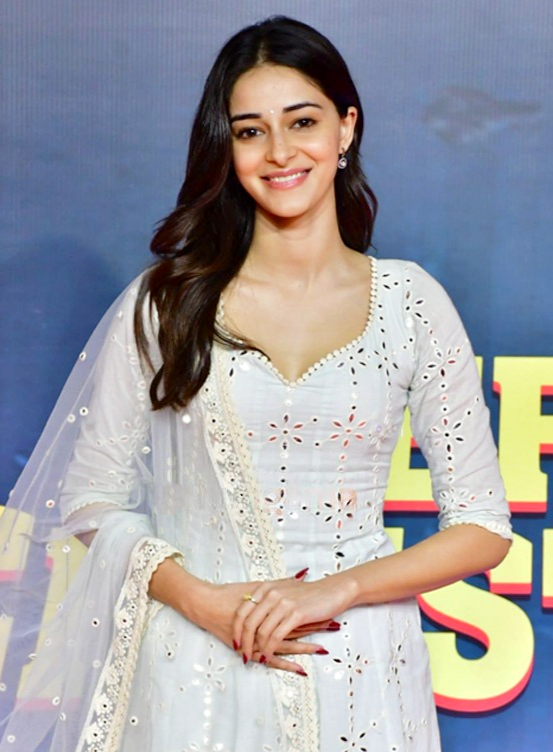
- The 2026 recipient: Ananya Panday
- Awarded for: Best Performance by an Actress in a Supporting Role
- Country: India
- Presented by: Zee Entertainment Enterprises
- First award: Karisma Kapoor, Dil To Pagal Hai (1998)
- Currently held by: Ananya Panday, Kesari Chapter 2 (2026)
- Website: Zee Cine Awards

The Zee Cine Award Best Actor in a Supporting Role – Female is chosen by the viewers, and the winner is announced at the actual ceremony.

The award is given in March, but the actress who wins it is awarded for her work from a movie released in the previous year from 1 January to 31 December.

Sushmita Sen, Divya Dutta, Swara Bhaskar, Shabana Azmi and Madhuri Dixit are the five actresses to have won this award twice.

The most recent recipient is Ananya Panday for Kesari Chapter 2.

== Multiple wins ==
Wins	Recipient
2	Divya Dutta, Madhuri Dixit, Sushmita Sen, Swara Bhaskar, Shabana Azmi

== Winners ==
Year	Winner	Film
1998	Karisma Kapoor	Dil To Pagal Hai
1999	Rani Mukerji	Kuch Kuch Hota Hai
2000	Sushmita Sen	Biwi No.1
2001	Jaya Bachchan	Fiza
2002	Madhuri Dixit	Lajja
2003	Sushmita Sen	Filhaal...
2004	Shabana Azmi	Tehzeeb
2005	Divya Dutta	Veer-Zaara
2006	Ayesha Kapur	Black
2007	Konkona Sen Sharma	Omkara
2008	Shilpa Shetty	Life in a... Metro
2009	Not held	
2010	Not held	
2011	Prachi Desai	Once Upon a Time in Mumbaai
2012	Swara Bhaskar	Tanu Weds Manu
2013	Anushka Sharma	Jab Tak Hai Jaan
2014	Divya Dutta	Bhaag Milkha Bhaag
2014	Swara Bhaskar	Raanjhanaa
2015	Tabu	Haider
2016	Shweta Tripathi	Masaan
2017	Shabana Azmi	Neerja
2018	Meher Vij	Secret Superstar
2019	Katrina Kaif	Zero
2020	Bhumi Pednekar	Bala
2021	Not held	
2022	Not held	
2023	Sheeba Chaddha	Doctor G
2024	Dimple Kapadia	Pathaan
2025	Madhuri Dixit	Bhool Bhulaiyaa 3
2026	Ananya Panday	Kesari Chapter 2

== See also ==
- Zee Cine Awards
- Bollywood
- Cinema of India
