= Merzin Tavaria =

Company co-founder

- Born: Merzin Tavaria; 15 December 1973 (age 52)
- Education: K.C. College, Mumbai
- Occupations: Chief Creative Director and co-founder, Prime Focus

Merzin Tavaria (born 15 December 1973) is the Chief Creative Director and co-founder, Prime Focus. He has been associated with the company since its inception and works in collaboration with the United Kingdom, United States, Canada and India studios of Prime Focus.

Tavaria has worked for about two decades in the media and entertainment industry and is respected for his contribution towards the use of color grading and visual effects in India. He is also a jury member at various film and advertising festivals, and has been a speaker on many industry related events.

== Early life and education ==
Tavaria grew up in Mumbai and completed his schooling from St. Peter's School, Mumbai in 1991. In 1995, he graduated with a bachelor's degree in Commerce from K.C. College, Mumbai.

== Career ==
Tavaria started his career as teacher at Compufield Computer Institute, where he met Namit Malhotra, Prakash Kurup and Huzefa Lokhandwala. In 1997, they came together and started 'Prime Focus' in a small garage in Mumbai.

Under Prime Focus, Tavaria has led teams delivering visual effects for Hollywood films such as The Great Gatsby, Total Recall, White House Down, Sin City: A Dame to Kill For and Brett Ratner's Hercules. Tavaria has also directed the visual effects for Bollywood films like Bang Bang!, Kick, Kai Po Che!, Yeh Jawaani Hai Deewani, Dabangg 2, Guzaarish, Housefull 2, Blue, and Ghajini.

In 2010, when Prime Focus created View-D, their proprietary 2D to stereoscopic 3D conversion process, Tavaria set up the View-D team of 2000 professionals in India who currently operate out of Prime Focus' Mumbai, Chandigarh and Goa facilities. This team undertook the 3D conversion of Warner Bros.' Clash of the Titans – the first full length feature film to be converted from 2D to 3D. Tavaria was sought for creative leadership in the 3D conversion of films like Gravity, Guardians of the Galaxy, Transformers: Age of Extinction, World War Z, Men in Black 3, Star Wars: Episode I, II & III, Harry Potter and the Deathly Hallows – Part 2, Transformers: Dark of the Moon, Maleficent, Seventh Son, The Chronicles of Narnia: The Voyage of the Dawn Treader and Ra.One.

Tavaria launched Prime Focus World's Animation division in 2012. The division holds 100 employees and has worked on projects such as Legends of Chima. The animation division completed 4 seasons of the show and is now working on new projects.

== Awards and accolades ==
- Apollo Award 2014 for Best VFX in International Feature Film category for Sin City: A Dame to Kill For.
- 24 FPS Award 2014 for Best VFX in International Feature Film category for Sin City: A Dame to Kill For.
- 24 FPS Award 2013 for Best VFX in International Feature Film category for White House Down.
- Gold Award, Filmcraft (Special Effects), Goafest 2011 for IndiGo's 'On Time' commercial.
- CGTantra Community Awards 2011 for Best VFX in Commercial for Zen Estilo advertisement.
- Apsara Awards 2011 for Best Visual Effects for Guzaarish.
- EME Awards 2011 for Best Film Content Guzaarish.
- EME Awards 2011 for the Best TV Content for IniGo's 'On-Time' advert.
- Award of Excellence at ASIFA IAD 2010 for Raavan.
- Apsara Awards 2010 for 'Best Visual Effects' for Blue.
- IIFA Award 2009 for 'Best Visual Effects' for Ghajini.
- Filmfare Award 2009 for 'Best VFX in a Motion Picture' for Love Story 2050.
- FICCI BAF Jury Award for 'Best VFX Shot of the Year' for Love Story 2050.
- 24fps Award 2008 for 'Outstanding Contribution to Visual Effects' for Love Story 2050.
- FICCI BAF Award 2008 for 'Best VFX in a Commercial' for Honda CBZ "Hero".

== Filmography ==
=== International films ===
Year	Film	Role
2014	Sin City: A Dame to Kill For	Creative Director
2014	Hercules	VFX Creative Director
2014	Teenage Mutant Ninja Turtles	S3D Creative Director
2014	The Expendables 3	S3D Creative Director
2014	Maleficent	S3D Creative Director
2014	The Amazing Spider-Man 2	S3D Creative Director
2013	White House Down	VFX Creative Director
2013	Gravity	S3D Creative Director
2013	The Great Gatsby	S3D and VFX Creative Director
2013	World War Z	S3D Creative Director
2012	Frankenweenie	S3D Creative Director
2012	Total Recall	VFX Creative Director
2012	Storage 24	VFX Creative Director
2012	Men in Black 3	S3D Creative Director
2012	Wrath of the Titans	S3D Creative Director
2011	Mirror Mirror	VFX Creative Director
2011	Star Wars: Episode I – The Phantom Menace	S3D Creative Director
2011	Immortals	S3D Supervisor
2011	Scream 4	VFX Creative Director
2011	Once Upon a Warrior	VFX Creative Director
2011	Harry Potter and the Deathly Hallows – Part 2	S3D Creative Director
2011	Transformers: Dark of the Moon	S3D Creative Director
2010	The Chronicles of Narnia: The Voyage of the Dawn Treader	S3D Creative Director
2010	Robin Hood	VFX Creative Director
2010	Harry Potter and the Deathly Hallows – Part 1	S3D Creative Director
2010	My Soul to Take	S3D Creative Director
2010	Clash of the Titans	S3D Creative Director
2008	The Sick House	VFX Supervisor
2007	28 Weeks Later	Head of Visual Effects
2005	Red Mercury	VFX Supervisor

=== Hindi films ===
Year	Film	Role
2014	Bang Bang!	VFX Creative Director
2014	Kick	VFX Creative Director
2013	Yeh Jawaani Hai Deewani	VFX Creative Director
2012	English Vinglish	VFX Creative Director
2012	OMG - Oh My God!	VFX Creative Director
2012	Ek Tha Tiger	VFX Creative Director
2012	Cocktail	VFX Creative Director
2012	Housefull 2	VFX Creative Director
2012	Ekk Deewana Tha	Visual Effects Creative Director
2012	Jannat 2	Visual Effects Creative Director
2012	Paan Singh Tomar	VFX Creative Director
2012	Agent Vinod	VFX Creative Director
2012	Players	VFX Creative Director
2011	Rockstar	VFX Creative Director
2011	Ra.One	VFX Creative Director
2011	Shaitan	VFX Creative Director
2011	Murder 2	VFX Creative Director
2011	No One Killed Jessica	VFX Creative Director
2011	Bollywood: The Greatest Love Story Ever Told	VFX Creative Director
2010	Guzaarish	VFX Creative Director
2010	Housefull	VFX Creative Director
2010	Prince	VFX Creative Director
2010	Raavan	VFX Creative Director
2010	Bumm Bumm Bole	VFX Creative Director
2009	Wanted	VFX Creative Director
2009	Blue	Visual Effects Supervisor
2009	Do Knot Disturb	Visual Effects Supervisor
2009	Wake Up Sid	Visual Effects Supervisor
2009	Love Aaj Kal	Visual Effects Supervisor
2009	Ajab Prem Ki Ghazab Kahani	Visual Effects Supervisor
2009	Luck	Visual Effects Supervisor
2009	Tum Mile	Visual Effects Supervisor
2009	8 x 10 Tasveer	Visual Effects Supervisor
2009	Raaz: The Mystery Continues	Visual Effects Supervisor
2009	Paa	Visual Effects Supervisor
2009	Chandni Chowk to China	Visual Effects Supervisor
2008	Ghajini	Visual Effects Supervisor
2008	Bachna Ae Haseeno	Visual Effects Supervisor
2008	Love Story 2050	Visual Effects Supervisor
2008	Kambakkht Ishq	Visual Effects Supervisor
2008	Tashan	Visual Effects Supervisor
2008	Bhoothnath	Visual Effects Supervisor
2008	Saawariya	Visual Effects Supervisor
2007	Partner	Visual Effects Supervisor
2007	Ta Ra Rum Pum	Visual Effects Supervisor
2007	Heyy Babyy	Head of Visual Effects
2007	Salaam-E-Ishq	Visual Effects Supervisor
2007	Guru	Visual Effects Supervisor
2006	Bhagam Bhag	Visual Effects Supervisor
2006	Omkara	VFX Supervisor
2006	Jaan-E-Mann	Visual Effects Supervisor
2006	Naksha	Visual Effects Supervisor
2006	Pyare Mohan	Visual Effects Supervisor
2006	Golmaal: Fun Unlimited	Visual Effects Supervisor
2006	Zinda	Visual Effects Supervisor
2005	Vaah! Life Ho Toh Aisi!	Visual Effects Supervisor
2005	Bluffmaster!	Visual Effects Supervisor
2005	No Entry	Visual Effects Supervisor
2005	The Rising: Ballad of Mangal Pandey	Visual Effects Supervisor
2005	Dus	Visual Effects Supervisor
2005	Main Aisa Hi Hoon	Editor
2005	Karam	Visual Effects Supervisor
2004	Musafir	Visual Effects Supervisor
2004	Kyun! Ho Gaya Na...	Visual Effects Supervisor
2004	Mujhse Shaadi Karogi	Visual Effects Supervisor
2004	Khakee	Editor
2004	Run	Visual Effects Supervisor
2003	Kuch Naa Kaho	Visual Effects Supervisor
2003	Qayamat: City Under Threat	Visual Effects Supervisor / Editor / Promo Packaging
2003	Khushi	Editor
2002	Kaante	Visual Effects Supervisor
2002	Teesri Aankh: The Hidden Camera	Editor

== Commercials ==
=== Indian ===
Year	Brand	Role
2011	Google Chrome 3D	S3D Creative Director
2010	IndiGo's 'On Time'	VFX Creative Director
2010	Commonwealth Games 2010 Opening Ceremony	VFX Creative Director
2009	Reliance Mobile 'Simply'	VFX Supervisor
2009	Central Bank of India	VFX Supervisor
2009	Maxo	VFX Supervisor
2009	Whirlpool 'Water You Can Trust'	VFX and Animation Supervisor
2009	Lotte 'Coffy Bite'	VFX Supervisor
2009	Honda CBZ Extreme	VFX Supervisor

=== International ===
Year	Brand	Role
2011	Relentless Virtues	VFX Creative Director
2010	Dubai Shopping Festival	VFX Creative Director
2009	Rhydian's new album 'O Fortuna'	VFX Creative Director
2009	Popstar to Opera Star	VFX Creative Director
2009	The National Lottery Bingo Scratch cards	VFX Creative Director
