= Virti Vaghani =

Indian actress and model

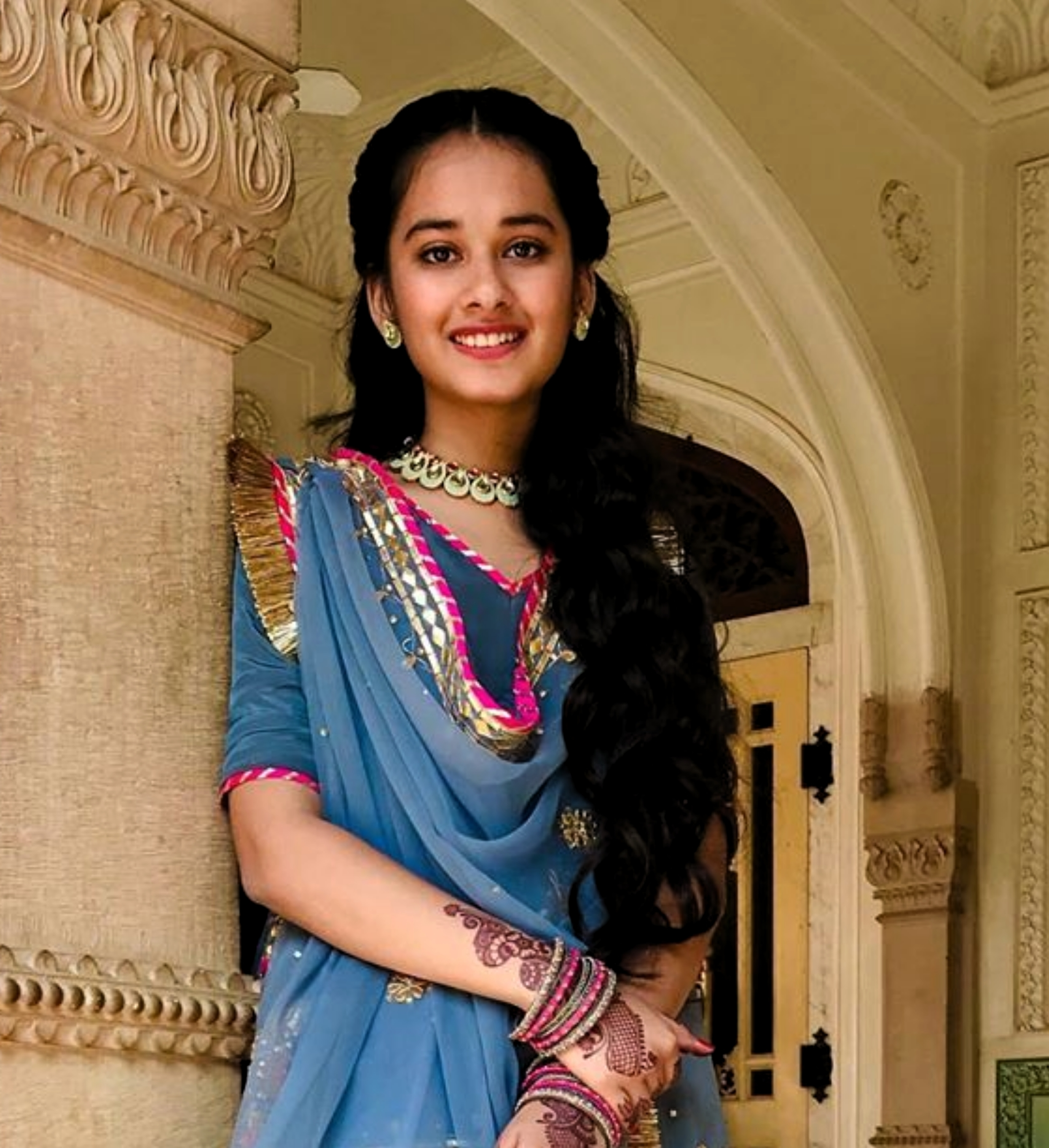
- Born: 2 October 2003 (age 22); Mumbai, Maharashtra, India
- Citizenship: Indian
- Occupation: Actress

Virti Vaghani is an Indian actress and model, known for Jai Shri Krishna (2008) and Hope Aur Hum (2018). She has also appeared in more than 100 commercials.

== Acting career ==
Virti initially started as a child artist by advertising for well-known brands such as Whirlpool, Kwality Walls, Clinic Plus Shampoo, Dettol Soap, Knorr Soup, Mobilla and Colgate. She started her career in the year 2008 with the television show Jai Shri Krishna where playing a role for child Radha premiered on Colors TV which have been shared with Nick Channel. Recently, which is being dubbed and telecast in Tamil and Bengali TV channels. Afterwards, she worked in Patiala House in 2008, stars Akshay Kumar and Anushka Sharma, directed by Nikkhil Advani which was her first debut in Bollywood. And in 2018, she worked a Comedy-drama film Hope Aur Hum, starring Naseeruddin Shah and Sonali Kulkarni. In a case, playing the role of Tanu from Hope Aur Hum, she was facing difficulty in pronouncing a few words correctly, then Naseeruddin Shah became helpful and tried ‘Henry Higgins’ trick on her which was fascinating as she claimed. In 2020, she appeared in the Disney+Hotstar web series ‘Aarya’, featuring Sushmita Sen, Chandrachur Singh and Sikandar Kher. She plays the role of Aarya's teenage daughter Arundhati, who is typically in her teen stage of life and usually threatened to fall into an immoral relationship.

== Filmography ==
Year	Title	Role	Language	Notes
2011	Patiala House		Hindi	
2018	Hope Aur Hum	Tanu	Hindi	
2019	Mardaani 2	Priyanka	Hindi	
2022	Kotha Kothaga	Rajee	Telugu	
2025	Sundarakanda	Eira	Telugu	

=== Television ===
Year	Title	Role	Network	Notes
2008	Jai Shri Krishna	Young Radha	Colors TV	
2020	Aarya	Aru Sareen (Arundati)	Hotstar	
2021	Butterflies	Mansi	Cornetto	Episode: "Half Half"
2021	This Town That Future	Raina	Amazon miniTV	short film
2022	Aarya	Aru Sareen (Arundati)	Hotstar	Season 2
2022	Tale of Two		Mobilla	Episode: Tale of Two
