= Sheetal Kale =

Indian actress

- Occupation: Actress
- Years active: 2015–present

Sheetal Kale is an Indian actress, who has worked predominantly in the Hindi film industry, and is best known for her role in the series Taali (2023).

== Life and career ==
In 2013, Sheetal started her career with Karma Kala Manch Theatre, Mumbai, and then made into the films Atal Faisla (2018) and Jai Chhati Maa (2020). In 2023, she made her OTT debut with Taali co-starring with Sushmita Sen. Kale plays a transgender character on the series.

== Filmography ==
=== Films ===
Key
| † | Denotes films that have not yet been released |

| Year | Title | Role | Notes | Ref. |
|---|---|---|---|---|
| 2018 | Chameli | Jenny | | |
| 2018 | Atla Faisla | Radha | Lead Actress | |
| 2020 | Jai Chhathi Maa | Kajal | | |
| TBC | Entrapped † | TBA | | |

=== Web series ===
| Year | Title | Role | Notes | Ref. |
|---|---|---|---|---|
| 2020 | Mirzapur | Watchwoman | | |
| 2023 | Taali | Nargis | | |
