= Kotha Kothaga =

- Release poster
- Directed by: Hanumaan Vasamsetty
- Produced by: Muralidhar Reddy Mukkara
- Starring: Ajay Aman; Virti Vaghani
- Edited by: Prawin Pudi
- Music by: Shekar Chandra
- Production company: Funfilled Entertainments
- Release date: 9 September 2022
- Country: India
- Language: Telugu

Kotha Kothaga is a 2022 Indian Telugu-language romantic drama film directed by Hanumaan Vasamsetty and starring Ajay Aman and Virti Vaghani.

The film was released on 9 September 2022.

== Plot ==
Sidhu and Rajee study at the same engineering college. Sidhu is deeply in love with Rajee although Rajee doesn't reciprocate his feelings.

== Cast ==
- Ajay Aman as Sidhu
- Virti Vaghani as Rajee
- Kalyani Natarajan as Padma
- Kumar Sai
- Pawan Tej as Ram
- Y. Kasi Viswanath
- Lavanya Reddy as Sathya

== Soundtrack ==
The songs are composed by Shekar Chandra.

No.	Title	Lyrics	Singer(s)	Length
1.	"Priyathama"	Ananta Sriram	Sid Sriram	4:01
2.	"Diamond Rani"	Kasarla Shyam	Anurag Kulkarni	3:27
3.	"Thanuvoka Thella Kagitham"	Shree Mani	Sireesha Bhagavatula	3:04
Total length:				10:32

== Reception ==
A critic from The Times of India wrote that "Unfortunately, while some scenes and a couple of songs appeal to the senses, the film gets undone by cliches". A critic from Sakshi Post wrote that "Kotha Kothaga is a beautiful love story".
