= Khushi (2003 Hindi film) =

2003 Indian film by S. J. Suryah

- Poster
- Directed by: SJ Suryah
- Written by: SJ Suryah; Dialogue: Aman Jaffery; Bolu Khan
- Based on: Kushi by SJ Suryah
- Produced by: Boney Kapoor
- Starring: Fardeen Khan; Kareena Kapoor
- Cinematography: K. V. Guhan
- Edited by: Merzin Tavaria
- Music by: Songs: Anu Malik; Background Score: Naresh Sharma
- Production company: BSK Films
- Distributed by: Shemaroo Entertainment
- Release date: 7 February 2003
- Country: India
- Language: Hindi

Khushi (transl. Happiness; Hindi pronunciation: [ˈxʊʃi]) is a 2003 Indian Hindi-language romantic comedy film directed by SJ Suryah and produced by Boney Kapoor. It is a remake of the director's own 2000 Tamil film Kushi. The film stars Fardeen Khan and Kareena Kapoor.

== Plot ==
Khushi tells the story of a boy and a girl who are in love but are kept apart by their inflated egos. Karan was born and raised in Kolkata, whilst Khushi was born and brought up in a village in Uttarakhand. Karan intends to move to Canada to pursue further studies; however, due to an accident, he is forced to attend the University of Mumbai. Khushi insists on pursuing her education at the University of Mumbai. At the university, Karan meets Khushi through his friends, Vicky and Priya. Vicky and Priya fall in love with each other, and Karan and Khushi decide to bring them together. In the process, Karan and Khushi fall in love with each other; however, they are not able to reciprocate their love for one another.

== Cast ==
- Fardeen Khan as Karan Roy
- Kareena Kapoor as Khushi Singh
- Amrish Puri as Vir Bhadra Singh
- Navin Nischol as Mr. Roy
- Beena Banerjee as Madhu Roy
- Johnny Lever as Milestone
- Sharat Saxena as Zohravar Singh
- Sakshi Shivanand as Roma Singh
- Anoop Soni as Vicky
- S. J. Suryah as a pedestrian in Kolkata (guest appearance)

== Soundtrack ==
Khushi

Soundtrack album by Anu Malik
- Released: 14 November 2002
- Genre: Feature film soundtrack
- Label: Tips Industries

The film's soundtrack was composed by Anu Malik. According to the Indian trade website Box Office India, with around 1.2 million units sold, this film's soundtrack album was the tenth highest-selling album of the year. The song "Jiya Maine Jiya" was taken from the song "Cheliya" from the Telugu film Kushi.

#	Title	Singer(s)
1	"Aaj Piya"	Sunidhi Chauhan
2	"Good Morning India"	Sonu Nigam
3	"Hai Re Hai Re"	KK, Hema Sardesai
4	"Jiya Main Jiya"	Udit Narayan, Alka Yagnik
5	"Khushi Aaye Re Aaye Re"	Sunidhi Chauhan
6	"Tere Bina"	Shaan, Alka Yagnik (Male back up Vocals: Kunal Ganjawala)

== Reception ==
Komal Nahta of India Syndicate wrote, "On the whole, Khushi remains a dull and dreary love story and will have an unhappy and short innings at the box-office. Although designed as a film for the youth, it will be rejected even by them. A heavy loser". Taran Adarsh of Bollywood Hungama rated the film 2/5 and wrote, "On the whole, KHUSHI has several engaging moments to appeal to the youth and family audiences".
