= St. Peter's School, Mumbai =

Private school in Mumbai, Maharashtra, India

St. Peter's School

Location
- Shivdas Champsey Marg, Mazagaon, Mumbai, Maharashtra, India; 18°58′3.72″N 72°50′25.1952″E

Information
- School type: Private unaided
- Motto: Latin: Esse Quam Videri (To be rather than to seem)
- Established: 1874; 152 years ago
- Founders: The Cowley Fathers
- Principal: Mr. Eugene J. D'Monte
- Teaching staff: 262
- Grades: K-10
- Enrollment: 5166
- Language: English
- Houses: St. Andrew; St. James; St. Matthew; St. Thomas; St. Paul; St. John; St. Luke; St. Mark
- Publication: The School Calendar
- Website: stpetersschool.net.in

St. Peter's School, Mumbai, or St. Peter's School I.C.S.E. is a private unaided school, located in Mazagaon, Mumbai, in the state of Maharashtra, India. It is affiliated with the ICSE school syllabus and has English as its primary language of instruction.

== History ==
The school was founded in 1874 by the Cowley Fathers. The school originated as a choir school for members of St. Peter's Church, which had previously been established in 1858 with funds donated by Mr. Shepherd, on land provided by the Government. A few poor children were also taken into care by the Fathers at this time, marking the start of an essential aspect of the Fathers' mission in Mumbai.

St. Peter's Girls' High School in Byculla was established on 16 August 1875. In June of 1876, a few boys were admitted to the school.

On 1 March 1878, a compact boys' school was founded in rented premises in Mazagaon, and funds were obtained for a new structure under the railway bridge next to Dockyard Road railway station. The Government provided half of the funding for this new school building, with the remaining coming from St. Peter's Church parishioners and well-wishing individuals. The new structure was officially opened in October 1879 on the grounds of St. Peter's Church. (Note: This information is listed in The School Calendar.)

In 1905, the site of St. Peter’s Church was claimed by the Mumbai Port Trust to allow for the extension of the Port Trust Railway and the Harbour Railway Line. A new site at the junction of Dockyard Road and Belvedere Road was granted by the Government and the present St. Peter’s Chapel was built in 1907 and finished in 1908.

On 19 January 1910, St. Peter's High School for Boys and Girls was officially inaugurated on the school's parapet.

== Academics ==
The school has two sessions, one morning and one afternoon. The morning school being from 7:00 A.M. to 11:50 A.M., and the afternoon school being from 12:10 P.M. to 5:00 P.M. The school year consists of two terms, from March to August, and from September to February. The course of school studies extends from the Preparatory Class to Class 10. It is designed to prepare students for the ICSE Examination, conducted by the Council for the Indian School Certificate Examinations. The school recently had its 150-year anniversary at the beginning of 2024.

=== Awards ===
As per the Education Today - India School Merit Awards 2022, St. Peter's School ranked ninth nationwide, third statewide, and second citywide. The school also ranked first nationwide under the category of 'India's Top ICSE Schools Parameter Wise - Holistic Education' as per Education Today - India School Merit Awards 2023.

== School organizations ==
All students are assigned to a house. There were four houses until St. Paul and St. John were added, and then St. Luke and St. Mark were added.

- St. Andrew (blue)
- St. James (green)
- St. Matthew (yellow)
- St. Thomas (red)
- St. Paul (orange)
- St. John (purple)
- St. Luke (fluorescent blue)
- St. Mark (rust)

St. Paul and St. John were added in 2017, resulting in the splitting of the morning and afternoon sections' houses. The morning had the original four, whereas the afternoon had the newly introduced ones. St. Luke and St. Mark were announced in 2019 but were added to the school in 2022 due to the COVID-19 pandemic. They now serve as the third and fourth houses in the afternoon section.

== Principals ==
The following individuals have served as principal of the school:

Ordinal	Officeholder	Term start	Term end	Time in office
1	Father R. L. Page	1874	1890	15–16 years
2	Father J. W. Biscoe	1890	1896	5–6 years
3	Father A. E. Tovey	1896	1903	6–7 years
4	Father A. F. Langmore	1903	1911	7–8 years
5	Father T. E. Tovey	1911	1918	6–7 years
6	Father W. B. O'Brien	1918	1930	11–12 years
7	Father B. D. Wilkins	1931	1932	0–1 years
8	Father C. W. Withworth	1933	1949	15–16 years
9	Father H. E. W. Slade	1949	1955	5–6 years
10	Mr. M. W. Duthie	1955	1965	10–11 years
11	Mr. Cecil Julian Olliver	1965	1982	16–17 years
12	Mr. E. G. Myall	1982	2001	18–19 years
13	Mr. Dornford F. S. Garrett	2001	2006	4–5 years
14	Mr. Jayant Biswas	2006	2008	1–2 years
15	Mr. Brian N. Robbins	2008	2013	4–5 years
16	Mr. Eugene J. D'Monte	2013	2026	12–13 years
17	Mrs. Gloria Stephens	2026	incumbent	0 years

== Notable alumni ==
=== Business and economics ===
- Merzin Tavaria – Chief Creative Director and Co-founder of Prime Focus

=== Literature ===
- Ayaz Memon – journalist, columnist, author, and former lawyer

=== Performing arts ===
- Salim Merchant – singer, songwriter
- Sulaiman Merchant – singer, songwriter
- Kunal Ganjawala – singer, songwriter

== See also ==
- List of schools in Mumbai
