= Hope Aur Hum =

2018 indian family-drama film

- Directed by: Sudip Bandyopadhyay
- Written by: Sudip Bandyopadhyay Neha Pawar
- Produced by: Samira Bandyopadhyay; Co-Producer; Divya Girish Shetty
- Starring: Naseeruddin Shah; Sonali Kulkarni; Aamir Bashir; Naveen Kasturia; Kabir Sajid; Virti Vaghani; Kenil kajavadra
- Cinematography: Ravi K. Chandran
- Edited by: Shivkumar Panicker
- Music by: Rupert Fernandes
- Production company: Thumbnail Pictures
- Distributed by: PVR Pictures
- Release date: 11 May 2018
- Running time: 95 minutes
- Country: India
- Language: Hindi

Hope Aur Hum (transl. Hope and us) is a 2018 Indian Hindi-language family drama film produced by Samira Bandopadhyay under her production banner, Thumbnail Pictures, and directed by Sudip Bandopadhyay. The film features an ensemble cast, including Naseeruddin Shah, Sonali Kulkarni, Aamir Bashir and Naveen Kasturia. It was released in theaters on 11 May 2018.

== Plot ==
The movie tells the story of a father who is obsessed with a vintage copying machine, elevating photocopying to an art form. However, he struggles to come to terms with the fact that the machine has reached the end of its lifespan. Eventually, he decides to sell it for the benefit of his family, but later discovers that spare parts are available. As the story unfolds, the film explores the life of each family member and how their lives are intertwined with one another.

== Cast ==
- Naseeruddin Shah as Nagesh Srivastava (Daadu)
- Sonali Kulkarni as Adit (Daughter–in-law)
- Aamir Bashir as Neeraj (Elder Son)
- Naveen Kasturia as Nitin (Chachu)
- Kabir Sajid as Anurag
- Virti Vaghani as Tanu
- Neha Chauhan as Auto Girl
- Beena Banerjee as Nani

== Production ==
=== Development ===
The idea for this film was conceived in Kolkata during the college days of Sudip Bandyopadhyay, the director of this film. He reveals that the characters he wrote for the film are inspired by people he has encoun in his life. About the character of Nagesh Srivastava played by Naseeruddin Shah, the director states that, "For Nagesh’s character, I drew from people in my life: a photocopy machine owner I knew, my school headmaster, my football coach and also a little bit of me."

=== Casting ===
Director Sudip Bandyopadhyay says that he wrote the character of Nagesh Srivastava keeping Naseeruddin Shah in mind while Aamir Bashir and Naveen Kasturia were selected because of their resemblance to a young Naseeruddin Shah.

== Soundtrack ==
Hope Aur Hum

Soundtrack album by Rupert Fernandes
- Released: 1 May 2018
- Genre: Feature film soundtrack
- Length: 11:37
- Language: Hindi
- Label: T-Series
External audio
- Audio Jukebox on YouTube

The soundtrack of Hope Aur Hum comprises 3 songs which were composed by Rupert Fernandes while the lyrics were written by Saurabh Dikshit.

Tracklist
No.	Title	Singer(s)	Length
1.	"Hope Aur Hum"	Bhoomi Trivedi, Suraj Jagan	02:59
2.	"Acche Bacche Rote Nahin"	Sonu Nigam	04:13
3.	"Aye Zindagi"	Shaan	04:23
Total length:			11:37

== Critical reception ==
Reza Noorani of The Times of India praised the acting performances in the film but felt its screenplay was incoherent, giving the film a rating of 3 out of 5. Shalini Langers of The Indian Express gave the film a rating of 1.5 out of 5, criticizing its dull script and poor direction. Kriti Tulsiani of News18 said that the film has good intentions but lacks the strength to leave a lasting impact. Troy Ribeiro of Hindustan Times criticized the slow pacing of the film and its outdated plot and gave the film a rating of 2 out of 5.
