= Sowmya Raoh =

Indian playback singer (born 1983)

- Born: 18 April 1973 (age 53); Bengaluru, Karnataka, India
- Genres: Playback singing
- Years active: 1993–present

Sowmya Raoh is an Indian playback singer who has performed in Kannada, Tamil, Hindi and Telugu languages.

== Early life and career ==
Sowmya was born in a Kannada speaking family to veteran singer B. K. Sumitra and Sudhakar in Bengaluru, Karnataka, India. Sowmya has a brother named Sunil Raoh, who is an actor in the Kannada film industry. Her mother is popular playback and devotional singer in Kannada. As a child, Sowmya would accompany her mother to the studios for recording. She then slowly graduated to become a child singer. Sowmya's father worked in Reserve Bank of India.

Sowmya started singing at the age of seven. She took a break from singing while she was in school as she thought that would affect her studies. After a period of five to six years, she gradually turned her attention towards singing by learning Carnatic music. However, she ended up becoming a voice actor before venturing into films. She claims that, "I wanted to train for singing for heroines, not children".

== Musical career ==
Sowmya started her career as a singer in south Indian films in 1993, and got a break in Bollywood nine years later. Her major break happened when composer Sandeep Chowta was looking for a singer who could sing well in Hindi. He chose Sowmya for a song ("Greekuveerudu") in the Telugu film Ninne Pelladata. The song gave her a much needed break. She went on to record the song in the Tamil and Hindi versions too.

Sowmya started her career in Bollywood in 2000. Her first assignment was for the song "Soul of Jungle", followed by a background track for the film Pyaar Tune Kya Kiya. Company was her first as a singer in Hindi. By this time she also sang for other Hindi films such as Dum and Bunty Aur Babli. In 2012, her item number 'Dreamum Wakeupum' for Sachin Kundalkar's Aiyyaa emerged a chartbuster and the song was also appreciated for its dance performance by Rani Mukerji and Prithviraj Sukumaran.

Having worked with composers such as Ilaiyaraaja and A. R. Rahman, she recorded over 200 songs in Tamil, Telugu and Kannada, as of 2006.

== Selected discography ==
| Year | Film | Language | Song | Co-singers |
|---|---|---|---|---|
| 1996 | Ninne Pelladata | Telugu | "Greeku Veerudu" | |
| 1998 | Kaadhal Kavithai | Tamil | "Aalana Naal Mudhala" | |
| 1999 | Suriya Paarvai | Tamil | "Boom Blast It" | |
| 2000 | Kushi | Tamil | “Macerina Macerina” | Devan Ekambaram |
| 2001 | Friends | Tamil | "Rukku Rukku" | Yuvan Shankar Raja, Vijay Yesudas |
| 2001 | Pyaar Tune Kya Kiya | Hindi | "Roundhe" | |
| 2002 | Company | Hindi | "Ankhon Mein" | |
| 2002 | Bollywood Hollywood | Hindi | | |
| 2002 | Dhool | Tamil | "Ithunundu Muthatthile" | Udit Narayan, Premgi Amaren |
| 2003 | Dum | Hindi | "Dil Hi Dil Mein" | Sonu Nigam |
| 2003 | Raktha Kanneeru | Kannada | "Baa baaro rasika " | |
| 2003 | Samay: When Time Strikes | Hindi | "Zindagi" | |
| 2004 | Dhoom | Hindi | "Dilbara" | Abhijeet Bhattacharya |
| 2003 | Ek Aur Ek Gyaarah | Hindi | "O Dushmana" | Sonu Nigam |
| 2005 | Bunty Aur Babli | Hindi | "Nach Baliye" | Shankar Mahadevan, Loy Mendonsa |
| 2005 | Super | Telugu | "Gichhi Gichhi" | Sandeep Chowta |
| 2006 | Khosla Ka Ghosla | Hindi | "Intezaar Aitbaar Tumse Pyar" | Qadar Niazi Qawwal |
| 2006 | Varalaru - History of Godfather | Tamil | "Kama Karaiyil" | Naresh Iyer |
| 2006 | Vettaiyaadu Vilaiyaadu | Tamil | "Nerupae" | Franko, Solar Sai |
| 2006 | Suntara gaali | Kannada | "Shame shame" | |
| 2006 | Family | Hindi | "Qatra qatra" | |
| 2006 | Family | Hindi | "Janam Janam" | |
| 2007 | Guru | Hindi | "Shauk Hai" | |
| 2007 | Tara Rum Pum | Hindi | "◦Nach le ve" | |
| 2007 | Welcome | Hindi | "Welcome" | Shaan, Wajid |
| 2007 | Bheema | Tamil | "Enadhuyire" | Nikhil Mathew, Chinmayi, Sadhana Sargam |
| 2007 | Pachaikili Muthucharam | Tamil | "Un Sirippinil" | Raphi |
| 2008 | Krazzy 4 | Hindi | "O re lakad " | |
| 2008 | Bindaas | Kannada | "Gubbachi goodinalli" | Udit Narayan |
| 2009 | Raam | Kannada | "Nanna Tutiyalli" | Udit Narayan |
| 2009 | Vamanan | Tamil | "Aedho Saigirai" | Javed Ali |
| 2009 | Wanted | Hindi | "Le le mazaa le" | Hrishikesh Lamrekar, Nikita Nigam, Suzanne D'Mello |
| 2009 | Do Knot Disturb | Hindi | "Beautiful Woman" | Neeraj Shridhar |
| 2009 | Junglee | Kannada | "Hale Patre" | Kailash Kher |
| 2009 | Josh | Telugu | "Awara Hawa" | Sandeep Chowta |
| 2011 | Vishnuvardhana | Kannada | "Yede olage" | Tippu |
| 2012 | Aiyyaa | Hindi | "Dreamum wakeupumm" | Amit Trivedi |
| 2013 | Baadshah | Telugu | "Welcome Kanakam" | Thaman |
| 2013 | Saheb, Biwi Aur Gangster Returns | Hindi | "Idhar Gire" | |
| 2013 | Simple Agi Ondh Love Story | Kannada | "Karagida Baaninalli" | |

== Accolades ==
=== Filmfare Awards ===
- 2013 – Filmfare Award for Best Female Playback Singer – Kannada for "Karagida Baaninalli" from Simple Agi Ondh Love Story

=== Stardust Awards ===
- Stardust Award for Best New Singer for " Laila Laila" from Samay: When Time Strikes (2003).
