= Sundarakanda (2025 film) =

2025 Indian film

- Directed by: Venkatesh Nimmalapudi
- Written by: Venkatesh Nimmalapudi
- Produced by: Santhosh Chinnapolla; Gowtham Reddy; Rakesh Mahankalli
- Starring: Nara Rohith; Sridevi Vijaykumar; Virti Vaghani
- Cinematography: Pradeesh M. Varma
- Edited by: Rohan Chillale
- Music by: Leon James
- Production company: Sandeep Picture Palace
- Distributed by: Aran Media Works
- Release date: 27 August 2025
- Running time: 137 minutes
- Country: India
- Language: Telugu

Sundarakanda is a 2025 Indian Telugu-language romantic comedy drama. Story, screenplay, and direction were handled by Venkatesh Nimmalapudi, who structured the film as a light-hearted romantic drama focusing on modern relationships and personal experiences. The music and background score were composed by Leon James, whose compositions enhance the emotional atmosphere of the film, while the technical team Shri Raghu, Kamala manohari and Gorla Mahesh contributed to presenting the story with an engaging cinematic style.. It stars Nara Rohith, Sridevi Vijaykumar and Virti Vaghani in lead roles.

The film was released on 27 August 2025.

== Plot ==
Siddharth (Nara Rohith) is a bachelor in his late 30s who is struggling to find a life partner. He has rejected numerous proposals because each candidate fails to meet five specific qualities he has in mind—qualities inspired by his memories and ideals.

One day, he meets Eira (Virti Vaghani), a college student who unexpectedly matches all the traits he has been seeking. Siddharth falls for her, but there's a significant obstacle: Eira's mother Vaishnavi (Sridevi Vijaykumar) strongly disapproves of their union, primarily because of the age difference.

As the story unfolds, it is revealed that Vaishnavi and Siddharth share a past—she was his first love during his school days. This twist intensifies the conflict and complicates Siddharth's attempt to win over both Eira and Vaishnavi's acceptance.

The narrative then progresses through comedic episodes, family drama, and emotional confrontations as Siddharth strives to overcome misunderstandings and relational hurdles. The film builds up to whether he can reconcile with Vaishnavi's objections and whether his love for Eira can prevail.

== Cast ==
- Nara Rohith as Siddharth
- Sridevi Vijaykumar as Vaishnavi, Eira’s mother and Siddharth’s childhood love-interest
- Virti Vaghani as Eira, Siddharth’s love-interest
- Naresh as Surendra, Siddharth’s father
- Rupa Lakshmi as Lakshmi, Siddharth’s mother
- Vasuki Anand as Megha, Siddharth's sister
- Satya as Satya, Eira’s professor
- Sunaina Badam as Satya’s wife
- VTV Ganesh as Venkata Rao, Vaishnavi’s father and Eira’s grandfather
- Abhinav Gomatam as Siddharth’s friend
- Raghu Babu as Siddharth’s office manager
- Ajay as Shiva, Siddharth’s childhood rival
- Raghu Karumanchi as Venkatarao’s henchmen
- Hashmi Duvvapu as Swamy, Siddharth’s friend
- Anil Kalyan as Rajeev, Siddharth’s friend
- Pavithra Bathula as Kumari, a maid
- Vasu Inturi
- Bhargav Garamapalli
- Surya Gopinath Adimulam
- Pavan Malla
- Viswant Duddumpudi as Dr. Sanjay (Cameo)

== Soundtrack ==
All lyrics are written by Sri Harsha Emani; all music is composed by Leon James.

Track listing
No.	Title	Singer(s)	Length
1.	"Bahusa Bahusa"	Sid Sriram	4:41
2.	"Hammayya"	Ram Miriyala	3:42
3.	"Please Please Ma'am"	Arjun Chandy, Deepak Blue, Aravind Srinivas, Sai Sharan, Reshma Shyam, Haripriya, Lavita Lobo	3:28
4.	"Dear Eira"	Keerthana Vaidyanathan	4:11
5.	"Dear Eira Reprise"	Haripriya	2:25
Total length:			18:27

== Release ==
Sundarakanda was released on 27 August 2025. Post-theatrical digital streaming rights and satellite television rights were acquired by JioHotstar and Star Maa respectively. It was released on JioHotstar on 23 September 2025.

== Reception ==
The Times of India rated the film 3/5 stars and wrote, "A watchable entertainer with clean humour, strong performances and a quirky hook that falters in execution. If you can overlook the predictable beats and uneven second half, Sundarakanda works as a light watch". Srivathsan Nadadhur of The Hindu stated, "Director Venkatesh Nimmalapudi has a smart premise, though the treatment is a mixed bag. It errs on way too many occasions to be a light, memorable film with a quirky concept". Aditya Devulapally of OTTplay rated the film 3.5/5 stars and wrote, "On the whole, Sundarakanda is a new-age romantic drama that has good comedy, amazing emotions, and a contemporary take on love". A critic from Cinema Express rated the film 2.5/5 and wrote, "It is uneven, often embarrassing, sometimes graceful. It gives us glimpses of a better film within it, and if nothing else, it pushes Telugu cinema a little further into uncomfortable terrain".
