= Nirbaak =

2015 Indian Bengali film

- Nirbaak film poster
- Directed by: Srijit Mukherji
- Written by: Srijit Mukherji
- Produced by: Shree Venkatesh Films
- Starring: Sushmita Sen; Anjan Dutt; Jisshu Sengupta; Ritwick Chakraborty
- Cinematography: Soumik Halder
- Edited by: Pronoy Dasgupta
- Music by: Neel Dutt; Hasin Mahtab
- Release date: 1 May 2015
- Country: India
- Language: Bengali

Nirbaak (transl. Speechless) is an Indian Bengali-language drama film directed by Srijit Mukherji, starring Sushmita Sen, Jisshu Sengupta, Ritwick Chakraborty and Anjan Dutt. This is the first Bengali film for Sushmita Sen. The film was released in Kolkata on 1 May 2015 and 15 May 2015 across rest of India.

== Plot ==
Affection: The story begins with the protagonist (Anjan Dutt) who is schizophrenic, suffering at the same time from dissociative identity disorder. He loves himself. He speaks little and in his daily routine he plays the role of himself as husband, his wife and he writes letter at the same time to his deceased mother (played by himself). In the opening scene, Anjan wakes up on his birthday, spends much time caring for self, going out alone and studying a book titled 'Make Yourself Unforgettable' while sitting at a park. Then comes Sushmita Sen who is also a regular visitor to the park and tries to share her own griefs (although most of the conversations are inaudible to the audience). At the end of the conversation, Anjan gives only one statement 'Love Yourself' and leaves. Later that day Anjan goes to a restaurant and cuts his birthday cake alone, eating it and spreading the cream all over his face (all of these he did in such a way as if he was not actually doing this, as if he were seating with his imaginary girlfriend, wife or live-in-partner). At night, he is being shown as a drunk who has just returned after spending the whole day outside. Then he plays his 'affectionate' part by masturbating while believing that he is on his bed with his partner. Next day he meets with an accident in his bathroom when he slips in his bathtub. He was then shown to be severely injuring his head and was being taken to a hospital.

Lust: Sushmita lives in Calcutta. She is an author. She loves her city very much and does not want to leave it for the sake of her boyfriend (Jisshu Sengupta). Here the protagonist is actually a tree in the park, which is visited by Sushmita on a regular basis. Then one day she falls asleep under the tree. The tree is then shown to have sex with her platonically ejaculating juice from its small branch (which is in the shape of a penis). Then enters Jisshu and the two are talking on the issue that whether Sushmita should live with her boyfriend. Each time Jissu tries to propose her, the tree distracts him in some way or other indirectly. She is only shown smooching her boyfriend and the camera is rolled in such a way as if to make us believe that the tree, under which she is sitting, is actually watching her close with lust. That night the tree is shown to dream of Sushmita playing sometimes as a beautiful dancing woman and at the other time as a dominant mistress to the tree. But in the same night, Jisshu wins her confidence after having sex with her and she decides to live with him. On the same night a cyclone strikes Kolkata and the tree is shown with its branches broken and scattered, the next morning.

Jealousy : When Sushmita comes to Jisshu's flat in an unnamed city, she is given a not so warm welcome by Jisshu's female dog 'Bingi' (the protagonist). Bingi is actually in love with Jisshu and 'it' thinks Sushmita as its rival stealing all 'its' precious moment with Jisshu. One day when Jisshu was gone for office, 'Bingi' attacks Sushmita and bites her. Jisshu, after returning home, when learns about this, attacks 'Bingi' with his belt. Later Jisshu and Sushmita decides to leave 'Bingi' at Jisshu's mom's place. When Jisshu was driving, Bingi tried to flee causing an accident. In that accident Sushmita dies, Jisshu goes into coma and Bingi remains unscathed.

Love: Ritwick Chakraborty plays the role of a caretaker of a morgue who is in love with the dead body of Sushmita. He dreams of dead Sushmita as his love of life. He becomes obsessed with her. The day she is about to be taken from the morgue by her relatives, some goons come in the morgue and tell Ritwick to leave the group leader with one of the dead bodies, possibly Sushmita's. Although the goon's intention was not particularly clarified in the movie, the implied meaning is that the goons were wanting to do acts of necrophilia. Ritwick protests and the goons mercilessly beat him to death. The time when Ritwick is shown being beaten, a close up of dead Sushmita (now the protagonist) showed as if she was smiling at what Ritwick was doing for her.

Separation: The film ends with the scene showing that Ritwick is now dead and is being set in the morgue as Sushmita's body at the same time is being taken out, depicting the sense of separation between the two dead bodies.

== Cast ==
None of the cast members' character names are disclosed throughout this film.

- Sushmita Sen as Unnamed Woman
- Anjan Dutt as Samson Gomes
- Jisshu Sengupta as Rahul
- Ritwick Chakraborty as Mrityunjoy Karmakar
- Biswajit Chakraborty
- Anindya Banerjee

== Reception ==
Nirbaak is a visually stunning film with great camerawork and background score. However, there are some goof-ups, such as the shot after a storm ravaging the 'tree in love'. The broken branches are sourced from somewhere else, and the question of a tree having an orgasm is raised. The film is a tribute to Salvador Dali and is recommended for viewers to enjoy.
