= Taali (TV series) =

- Official Release Poster
- Genre: Biography; Drama
- Created by: Arjun Singgh Baran; Kartik D Nishandar
- Written by: Kshitij Patwardhan
- Directed by: Ravi Jadhav
- Starring: Sushmita Sen; Ankur Bhatia; Aishwarya Narkar; Hemangi Kavi; Krutika Deo; Suvrat Joshi
- Music by: Amitraj
- Country of origin: India
- Original language: Hindi
- No. of seasons: 1
- No. of episodes: 6

Production
- Producers: Arjun Singgh Baran; Kartik Nishandar; Afeefa Nadiadwala Sayed
- Cinematography: Raghav Ramadoss
- Editor: Faisal Mahadik
- Production companies: GSEAMS; Triple Ace Entertainment; Jio Studios

Original release
- Network: JioCinema
- Release: 15 August 2023

Taali: Bajaungi Nahi, Bajwaungi is a 2023 Hindi-language Biographical drama TV series on JioCinema directed by Ravi Jadhav. It stars Sushmita Sen in the lead role, playing the transgender activist Shreegauri Sawant.

== Plot summary ==
It covers the key moments in the life and struggle of Mumbai-based transgender activist Gauri Sawant.

== Cast ==
- Sushmita Sen as Shreegauri Sawant
- Ankur Bhatia as Navin
- Aishwarya Narkar as Mother of Gauri Sawant
- Nandu Madhav as Inspector Dinkar Sawant, Father of Gauri Sawant
- Hemangi Kavi as Shreegauri Sawant's Sister
- Sheetal Kale as Nargis
- Suvrat Joshi as Munna
- Krutika Deo as Ganesh Sawant
- Nitish Rathore as Ward boy
- Meenakshi Chugh as Bengali Akka
- Shaan Kakkar as Pathan
- Hemant Choudhary as Sanjeev Mittal
- Nandini as transgender

== Release ==
Taali released on JioCinema on 15 August 2023.

== Reception ==
Saibal Chatterjee of NDTV writes "The Gauri Sawant story's specifics are available to the public. Taali's narrative serves to raise knowledge about the ambitions of the third gender and debunk myths that have kept them from receiving the respect they deserve as citizens of a free country, therefore the recounting does not seem needless".
