= Dastak (1996 film) =

- Poster
- Directed by: Mahesh Bhatt
- Written by: Vikram Bhatt
- Produced by: Mukesh Bhatt
- Starring: Sushmita Sen; Mukul Dev; Sharad Kapoor; Bhavna Datta; Manoj Bajpayee; Vishwajeet Pradhan; Tiku Talsania
- Cinematography: Bhushan Patel
- Edited by: Waman Bhonsle
- Music by: Rajesh Roshan
- Production company: Vishesh Films
- Release date: 29 November 1996
- Running time: 135 minutes
- Language: Hindi

Dastak (transl. Knock) is a 1996 Indian Hindi-language psychological thriller film edited and directed by Mahesh Bhatt, produced by Mukesh Bhatt with a script written by Vikram Bhatt. The film stars Sushmita Sen as a fictionalised version of herself in her debut film alongside Mukul Dev with Sharad Kapoor. The film was shot in South Africa and Seychelles.

== Plot ==
Dastak is the story of a mentally unstable genius, Sharad Sule and his obsession for Miss Universe, Sushmita. Sharad is so obsessed with Sushmita that he starts killing her near and dear ones in order to get to her. ACP Rohit Malhotra meets Sushmita, provides her high-level security detail and starts an investigation. Meanwhile, Sushmita faces another incident at an event, Rohit protects her and while calming down her, he calls her "Sush" (Sushmita's nickname which is known to only her parents and best friends) and from there she learns that Rohit is her childhood friend who adores her since school days. She rejoices and eventually fall in love with him. They start seeing each other; she starts feeling protected and happy, but faces another terrible incident of her best friend's death (murdered by Sharad) which breaks her down. Rohit makes a plan of moving Sushmita to another country for a while and gets the news circulated in the media, so that Sharad follow hers and gets in a trap. He joins her in Seychelles along with his trusted sub-ordinate and is supported by local authorities.

Their plan went successful as Sharad showed up and Rohit shoots him while chasing him. As his body is found Sushmita rejoices and celebrates with Rohit. But the happiness is short-lived as Sharad turns out to be alive, he kidnaps Sushmita and takes her to a distant isolated island in the Seychelles. There, he makes her life miserable. Sushmita tries every trick to get out of that hell. But ultimately, everything falls apart.

Sushmita tries to reform Sharad by telling him that he should face his problems rather than inflicting the same physical and mental pain (that he went through in his childhood) on other people. But Sharad refuses to listen and amend his ways. She tries to contact Rohit (who was devastated and keeps searching for her madly), plans to escape but fails every time. One day while Sharad was going to city for getting some things she gets a chance of coming out and writes "Help" on the speed boat. Her plan succeeds as Rohit and his subordinates see it and start chasing him. Sharad saw the word "Help" and gets enraged and shoots down everyone; including Rohit. In the climax, he tries to kill Sushmita as he believes that she betrayed him by contacting Rohit. Sushmita tries to run away but Sharad catches her and when he is about to hit her, Rohit (who survived the gun shot) jumps on him and saves Sushmita. Both men fight hard and Rohit gets stabbed by Sharad; while seeing Rohit in this condition Sushmita gets enraged and kills Sharad with an axe in self-defense. As she and Rohit return to India, she writes a self-help book and dedicates it to people like Sharad and eventually settles down happily with Rohit.

== Cast ==
- Sushmita Sen as Miss Universe Sushmita Sen (Sush)
- Mukul Dev as ACP Rohit Malhotra
- Sharad Kapoor as Sharad Sule
- Manoj Bajpayee as Avinash Banerjee
- Vishwajeet Pradhan as Inspector
- Tiku Talsania as Professor Fernandes

== Soundtrack ==
Dastak

Soundtrack album by Rajesh Roshan
- Released: September 1996
- Recorded: 1996
- Genre: Feature film soundtrack
- Length: 37:00
- Label: Saregama

The album was composed by Rajesh Roshan with lyrics by Javed Akhtar. All the songs were very popular and singers Kumar Sanu, Udit Narayan, Abhijeet, Alka Yagnik and Hema Sardesairendered their voices in the album.

| # | Title | Singer(s) |
|---|---|---|
| 1. | "Jadoo Bhari" | Udit Narayan |
| 2. | "Pal Beet Gaya" | Kumar Sanu & Alka Yagnik |
| 3. | "Tumhe Kaise (Slow)" | Abhijeet |
| 4. | "Sheeshay Se" | Kumar Sanu |
| 5. | "Milne Se Pehle" | Udit Narayan, Preeti Uttam |
| 6. | "Piya Piya" | Hema Sardesai |
| 7. | "Tumhe Kaise (Fast)" | Abhijeet |
