= Zindaggi Rocks =

- Film poster
- Directed by: Tanuja Chandra
- Written by: Tanuja Chandra; Mudassar Aziz
- Produced by: Anurradha Prasad
- Starring: Sushmita Sen; Shiney Ahuja
- Cinematography: Amirr Sayed
- Edited by: Sanjib Datta
- Music by: Anu Malik
- Production company: BAG Films
- Release date: 6 October 2006
- Country: India
- Language: Hindi

Zindaggi Rocks: A Musical Love Story (translates as Life Rocks) is a 2006 Indian Hindi-language musical romantic-drama film directed by Tanuja Chandra. The film stars Sushmita Sen and Shiney Ahuja. It is a love story between a famous singer, Kriya (Sen) and a doctor (Ahuja). The film was released on 6 October 2006.

== Synopsis ==
Dr. Suraj Rihan meets Kriya, a popular singer, in his hospital. While he is a quiet, responsible man, she is loud, kiddish, and a little crazy. Kriya invites Suraj to meet her family, which includes her very strict mother and her mother's twin sister, who is fun and giggly. Kriya has an adopted son, who is very mature for his age.

Kriya and Suraj fall in love, and their feelings are immediately tested by a crisis. Kriya's son is in a critical state as he has a hole in his heart, and they are unable to find a donor till the date of the operation. This makes Kriya commit homicide.

== Cast ==
- Sushmita Sen as Kriya Sengupta
- Shiney Ahuja as Dr. Suraj Rihan
- Julian Burkhardt as Dhruv Sengupta
- Ravi Gosain as Sam
- Gargi Patel as Suraj's mother-in-law
- Moushumi Chatterjee as Indrani Sengupta, Kriya's mother / Mausi
- Kim Sharma as Joy (voice dubbed by Urvi Ashar) (special appearance)
- Seema Biswas as DCP Gazala Qadri
- Olivier Lafont as Lester

== Soundtrack ==
Zindaggi Rocks

Soundtrack album by Anu Malik
- Released: 31 August 2006
- Genre: Feature film soundtrack
- Label: T-Series

Anu Malik chronology
Umrao Jaan (2006)	Zindaggi Rocks (2006)	Humko Deewana Kar Gaye (2006)

The soundtrack was composed Anu Malik. The lyrics were written by Sayeed Quadri and Mudassar Aziz. The music was released by T-Series.

=== Track listing ===
#	Song	Singer(s)	Lyrics	Length
1	"Meri Dhoop Hai Tu"	Javed Ali, Tulsi Kumar	Sayeed Quadri	4:37
2	"Rabbi"	Zubeen Garg, Sunidhi Chauhan, Krishna Beura	Mudassar Aziz	5:42
3	"Zindagi Rocks"	Anushka Manchanda	Mudassar Aziz	5:32
4	"Ek Din Fursat"	Sunidhi Chauhan	Mudassar Aziz	5:58
5	"Humko Chhoone Paas Aaiye"	Sunidhi Chauhan	Sayeed Quadri	6:58
6	"Hadh Ko Aadab Ko"	Sunidhi Chauhan	Sayeed Quadri	5:38
7	"Meri Dhoop Hai Tu (Remix)"	Javed Ali, Tulsi Kumar	Sayeed Quadri	4:21
8	"Rabbi (Remix)"	Zubeen Garg, Sunidhi Chauhan, Krishna	Mudassar Aziz	4:59
9	"Ek Din Fursat (Remix)"	Sunidhi Chauhan	Mudassar Aziz	5:21
10	"Hadh Ko Aadab Ko (Remix)"	Sunidhi Chauhan	Sayeed Quadri	4:10

== Reception ==
Taran Adarsh of IndiaFM gave the film 1.5 stars out of 5, writing ″Sush tries hard to infuse life in her character. She is effective at places, but tends to get theatrical at times. Shiney does a decent job, although the screenplay gives him little scope to go beyond a set of expressions. Moushumi Chatterjee is okay as the mother, but hams as the twin-sister. The get-up also doesn't suit her age. Kim Sharma is wasted. The child artist, Julian, is wonderful. Seema Biswas, as the cop, is alright. Ravi Gosain gets no scope. On the whole, ZINDAGGI ROCKS just doesn't rock. At the box-office, it's bound to go unnoticed. Gullu Singh of Rediff.com gave the film 1 star, writing ″Sushmita Sen and Shiney Ahuja do their best to save the film but the script and dialogues are so shoddy that it is impossible for them to do so.″
