= Shreegauri Sawant =

Indian transgender activist

Shreegauri (Gauri) Sawant is a transgender activist from Mumbai, India. She is the director of Sakhi Char Chowghi that helps transgender people and people with HIV/AIDS. She was featured in an ad by Vicks. She was made the goodwill ambassador of Election Commission in Maharashtra.

== Early life ==
Sawant was born and raised in Pune. Her mother died when she was seven years old and she was raised by her grandmother. Her father is a police officer. She left her house at the age of 14 or 15 as she didn't want to be a disappointment for her dad.

== Activism ==
Sawant founded the Sakhi Char Chowghi Trust in 2000. The NGO promotes safe sex and provides counselling to transgender people. In 2014, she became the first transgender person to file a petition in the Supreme Court of India for adoption rights of transgender people. She was a petitioner in the National Legal Services Authority (NALSA) case (National Legal Services Authority v. Union of India) in which the Supreme Court recognised transgender as the third gender. Sawant adopted a girl named Gayatri in 2008 after Gayatri's mother died of AIDS.

== Personal life and family ==
Sawant has an adopted daughter, whom she adopted at the age of 4. Sawant said in an interview that she had adopted her after her biological mother, a sex worker who died from AIDS, left her alone to be sold in the sex-trafficking industry.

== In popular culture ==
In 2017, Sawant was featured in an advertisement by Vicks as part of the company's "Touch of Care" campaign. It showed the story of Sawant and her adopted daughter.

A TV series named Taali on JioCinema featuring Sushmita Sen in the role of Gauri Sawant.
