= Main Aisa Hi Hoon =

2005 Indian film by Harry Baweja

- Directed by: Harry Baweja
- Written by: Harry Baweja; Bhavani Iyer; Anurag Kashyap
- Based on: I Am Sam by Kristine Johnson and Jessie Nelson
- Produced by: Pammi Baweja
- Starring: Ajay Devgn; Susmita Sen; Esha Deol; Anupam Kher; Rucha Vaidya
- Cinematography: Ayananka Bose
- Edited by: Merzin Tavaria
- Music by: Himesh Reshammiya
- Production company: Baweja Movies
- Distributed by: T-Series
- Release date: 6 May 2005
- Running time: 161 minutes
- Language: Hindi
- Budget: ₹9.5 crore
- Box office: ₹6.58 crore

Main Aisa Hi Hoon (transl. I Am Like This) is a 2005 Indian Hindi-language drama film directed by Harry Baweja starring Ajay Devgn, Sushmita Sen, Esha Deol and Anupam Kher. The film is a remake of the American drama film I Am Sam.

== Plot ==
Indraneel "Neel" Mohan Thakur, a man who has autism, works as a waiter in a coffee shop in Shimla while he raises his daughter Gungun (Rucha Vaidya) as a single parent. Gungun loves him very much and, in an attempt to remain at his level, refuses to go to school.

Gungun's mother, Maya Trivedi, came into Neel's life when she needed someone desperately. After giving birth to her, she disappeared, never to be seen again. For seven years, Neel has looked after the child, and both are happy together. However, Maya's father, Dayanath Trivedi, comes to India for his granddaughter.

On Gungun's birthday, Neel has a surprise party for her. Gungun is upset and leaves. Taking advantage of Gungun leaving her house, Dayanath gives Neel a court notice and soon takes Neel to court. With the help of the townspeople, Neel is introduced to Niti Khanna, a lawyer and single mother dealing with her own problems. Her son, Rahul, won't listen to her. Niti initially doesn't agree to represent Neel, but when Rahul meets Neel and becomes his friend, Niti realizes that she should help him. A custody battle ensues. It is found out that Maya was on drugs and died because of it, which is why she didn't return to her father or Neel. When the case is nearing completion and Dayanath's has almost won, Niti decides to marry Neel. After a fifteen-minute recess, Niti presents the marriage papers to the judge, and the latter declares that Gungun will be in the custody of Neel and Niti. Gungun accepts Niti as her mother and Rahul as her brother. Dayanath regrets being mean to Neel and accepts him as his son-in-law before flying back to London.

== Cast ==
- Ajay Devgn as Indraneel Thakur
- Sushmita Sen as Advocate Niti Khanna
- Esha as Maya Trivedi Thakur
- Anupam Kher as Dayanath Trivedi
- Rucha Vaidya as Gungun Thakur
- Aanjjan Srivastav as Divesh Mathur
- Vikram Gokhale as Dayanath's lawyer
- Lillete Dubey as Ritu Chatterjee

== Soundtrack ==
Main Aisa Hi Hoon

Soundtrack album by Himesh Reshammiya
- Released: 6 January 2005
- Venue: Mumbai
- Genre: Feature film soundtrack
- Language: Hindi
- Producer: Himesh Reshammiya

Himesh Reshammiya chronology
| Kuchh Meetha Ho Jaye (2005) | Main Aisa Hi Hoon (2005) | Yakeen (2005) |

The film's music is composed by Himesh Reshammiya with lyrics written by Sameer.

| # | Song | Singer(s) | Length |
|---|---|---|---|
| 1 | "Just Walk into My Life" | Shaan, Sunidhi Chauhan | 05:44 |
| 2 | "Deewanapan Deewangi" | Udit Narayan, Alka Yagnik | 05:50 |
| 3 | "Papa Mere Papa" | Sonu Nigam, Shreya Ghoshal, Baby Aparna | 07:15 |
| 5 | "Dil Mera Todo Na" | Udit Narayan | 05:38 |
| 4 | "Teri Galiyon Se" | Jayesh Gandhi, Sunidhi Chauhan | 06:31 |
| 6 | "Raat Hai Soyi Soyi" | Sonu Nigam | 06:45 |
| 7 | "Deewanapan Deewangi" (Piano) | Instrumental | 01:01 |

== Reception ==
Taran Adarsh of IndiaFM gave the film 1.5 out of 5, writing, "On the whole, MAIN AISA HI HOON could've been an engaging saga, but it runs out of steam in the post-interval portions." Patcy N of Rediff.com criticised the writing and performance of Devgan. She further wrote, "Overall, the movie is not worth watching. And you don't even have to wait till its unbelievable end to realise that!" Kaveree Bamzai of India Today wrote, "Why Harry Baweja decided to adapt it (a polite term for a virtual rip-off) will remain one of life's mysteries. Perhaps it was to display Ajay Devgan's acting chops or his cleaned-up teeth. Both are worthy of praise but at the cost of many tortuous tear jerking scenes and silly songs.
