= Aarya (TV series) =

Indian crime-thriller drama television series

- Season 1 promotional poster
- Genre: Crime; Thriller; Drama
- Created by: Ram Madhvani; Sandeep Modi
- Based on: Penoza by Pieter Bart Korthuis
- Written by: Season 1: Sandeep Shrivastava; Anu Singh Choudhary; Season 2: Sanyuktha Chawla Shaikh; Anu Singh Choudhary
- Directed by: Season 1: Ram Madhvani; Sandeep Modi; Vinod Rawat; Season 2: Ram Madhvani; Vinod Rawat; Kapil Sharma
- Starring: Sushmita Sen; Sikander Kher; Bhupendra Jadawat; Ankur Bhatia; Vikas Kumar
- Theme music composer: Vishal Khurana K
- Composer: Vishal Khurana K
- Country of origin: India
- Original language: Hindi
- No. of seasons: 3
- No. of episodes: 25

Production
- Executive producers: Vinod Iyer; Sia Bhuyan; Rhea Prabhu; Nikhil Madhok; Ranjana Mitra; Karn Gupta
- Producers: Ram Madhvani; Amita Madhvani
- Cinematography: Harshvir Oberai (Season 1); Sudip Sengupta (Season 2); Kavya Sharma (Season 3)
- Editors: Khushboo Raj; Abhimanyu Chaudhary
- Running time: 34–59 min
- Production companies: Ram Madhvani Films; Endemol Shine India

Original release
- Network: Hotstar
- Release: 19 June 2020 – 4 February 2024

Related
- Penoza; Red Widow

Aarya is an Indian crime-thriller drama television series on Disney+ Hotstar, co-created by Ram Madhvani and Sandeep Modi, who also directed the series, with Vinod Rawat, serving as the co-director. Produced by Madhvani under the banner Ram Madhvani Films, along with Endemol Shine Group, it stars Sushmita Sen in the title role and is based on the Dutch drama series Penoza (nl). The series is about Aarya, an independent woman who seeks to protect her family and joins a mafia gang in order to get revenge for her husband's murder. Recently, the show has been nominated for International Emmy Awards for best Drama series.

Madhvani bought the remake rights to the series in early 2011, and planned to adapt it into a feature film in 2014. However the film was eventually shelved due to casting and budgetary issues. He decided later to direct it instead as a web series for Hotstar's original content label Hotstar Specials. Filming for the first season began in December 2019 and ended in March 2020, with the series been filmed across Mumbai, Jaipur, Udaipur and Palgadh. The cinematography is handled by Harshvir Oberoi and editing was done by Khushboo Raj and Abhimanyu Chaudhary. Vishal Khurana K composed the background score and the songs.

Aarya was initially slated to release on 29 March 2020, but was postponed due to delay in post-production work. It was released on Disney+ Hotstar on 19 June 2020. The series marked the comeback of Sushmita Sen, as well as her digital debut. It has received positive reviews with critics praising Sen's performance. Sen received the award for Best Actress – Female, at the Filmfare OTT Awards, with the series receiving eight nominations. In July 2020, Sushmita Sen and Ram Madhvani announced the second season of the series.

The second season started filming on 1 March 2021 in Jaipur, but having been delayed due to the COVID-19 pandemic, wrapped up in June 2021. Season 2 premiered on 10 December 2021. The first half of Season 3, consisting of 4 episodes, premiered on 3 November 2023; the second half of Season 3, consisting of the remaining 4 episodes, premiered on 9 February 2024.

== Premise ==
The story of Aarya centres on Aarya Sareen, a caring mother and loving wife. However, she is quite naive and unaware of the illegal business her husband is involved in. Things take a turn for the worse for the family after Aarya's husband, Tej Sareen — a pharmaceutical tycoon — is mysteriously killed. The drug mafia and illegal syndicates seek to kill his entire family. In response, Aarya joins the gangs. The show traces her journey to becoming a mafia queen seeking revenge against those who killed her husband. Throughout, she also takes care of her three children.

== Cast ==
- Sushmita Sen as Aarya Sareen (Main Character), Udayveer and Rajeshwari's daughter, Tej's widow, Shekhawat, Nandini, Sangram and Saundarya's half-sister and Veer, Arundhati and Aditya's mother
- Chandrachur Singh as Tej Sareen, Aarya's husband and Veer, Arundhati and Aditya's father (Season 1, cameo in Season 2)
- Viren Vazirani as Veer Sareen, Aarya & Tej's 1st child
- Bhupendra Jadawat as Dhruv season 3.
- Virti Vaghani as Arundhati "Aru" Sareen (Seasons 1, 2)
- Aarushi Bajaj as Arundhati "Aru" Sareen (Season 3), Aarya & Tej's 2nd child
- Pratyaksh Panwar as Aditya "Adi" Sareen, Aarya & Tej's 3rd child
- Jayant Kripalani as Zorawar Singh Rathore, Rajeshwari's husband, Aarya's stepfather, Sangram and Saundarya's father
- Sohaila Kapur as Rajeshwari Singh Rathore, Aarya, Sangram and Saundarya's mother
- Flora Saini as Radhika "Rads", Zorawar's girlfriend (Season 1)
- Ankur Bhatia as Sangram Singh Rathore, Aarya's half-brother, Hina's love interest, Tej's business-partner and Jeet's father
- Sugandha Garg as Hina Khan, Aarya and Maya's best friend, Sangram's love interest, Jeet's mother
- Priyasha Bhardwaj as Saundarya Singh Rathore - Wilson, Aarya's half-sister and Bob's wife (Season 1)
- Alexx ONell as Bob Wilson, Saundarya's husband (Season 1)
- Sikandar Kher as Daulat, Rathore's loyal hitman
- Tariq Vasudeva as Prakash Kedia, Rathore's accountant (Season 2, Season 3)
- Namit Das as Jawahar Bishnoi, Maya's husband and Tej's Business Partner (Season 1)
- Maya Sarao as Maya Bishnoi, Aarya and Hina's best friend, Jawahar's wife
- Pallas Prajapati as Apu, Jawahar and Maya's son
- Manish Choudhary as Shekhawat, Udayveer's son, Aarya's half-brother (Season 1)
- Akash Khurana as Udayveer Shekhawat, Aarya, Shekhawat and Nandini's biological father (Season 2)
- Charu Shankar as Nandini Shekhawat, Udayveer Shekhawat's daughter (Season 2)
- Atharva Sharma as Rehaan, Udayveer Shekhawat's grandson and Nandini - Sooraj's son (Season 2)
- Lavishka Gupta as Reva, Udayveer Shekhawat's granddaughter and Nandini - Sooraj's daughter (Season 2)
- Vishwajeet Pradhan as Sampat, Shekhawat's former loyal hitman
- Vikas Kumar as ACP Younus Khan
- Nishank Verma as Ajay Sharma (ACP Khan's Boyfriend)
- Jagdish Purohit as Bhairon Singh (Season 1)
- Geetanjali Kulkarni as Sushila Shekhar (Season 2, Season 3)
- Shweta Pasricha as Roop, Paana's girlfriend (Season 2), Veer's girlfriend (Season 3)
- Joy Sengupta as Indrajeet Sarkar, transport in-charge (Season 1)
- Gargi Sawant as Pallavi, Veer's girlfriend (Season 1)
- Richard Bhakti Klein as Larry Wilson, Bob's father (Season 1)
- Girish Sharma as Mr. Rungta, Rajasthani businessman interested in buying Tej's factory (Season 2)
- Dilnaz Irani as Advocate Shefali Gupta (Season 2)
- Kalp Shah as Aarav Dhariwal, Adi's friend (Season 2)
- Shataf Figar as Arjun Dhariwal, Aarav's father (Season 2)
- Shabaaz Abdullah Badi as Vineet Poddar, Aarya's Personal Secretary after Kedia's Death(Season 3)
- Junaid Khan as Kabir, Sangram's manager (Season 2)
- Ashok Pathak as Gopi, Rathore's loyal hitman and Sangram's murderer (Season 2)
- Ila Arun as Nalini Sahiba, a heroin supplier (Season 3)
- Indraneil Sengupta as Sooraj Raizada, Udayveer’s son in-law and Nandini’s husband (Season 3)

== Episodes ==
Series	Episodes		Originally released
1	9		19 June 2020
2	8		10 December 2021
3	8	4	November 3, 2023
3	8	4	February 9, 2024

=== Season 1 (2020) ===
No. overall	No. in season	Title	Directed by	Written by	Original release date
1	1	"Tum Mujhpe Bharosa Karti Ho?"	Ram Madhvani; Sandeep Modi; Vinod Rawat	Sandeep Shrivastava; Anu Singh Choudhary	19 June 2020
Tej and Aarya Sareen have three children Veer, Arundati and Aditya. Tej who was supposed to take Adi to school drops the plans as his partners in the company Aaryasattava Pharmaceuticals Sangram and Jawahar call due to an emergency. Adi takes his father's gun from his car without anyone’s knowledge and point it at the kids who were bullying him at his school. Meanwhile Aarya visits her mother, Rajeshwari. During the visit Rajeshwari denies to attend the marriage of her daughter because of the girlfriend Aarya's father, Zorawar, has even though Aarya's parents are not yet divorced. Aarya visits her father's house and tells him not to bring his girlfriend, Radhika to the wedding as she wants her mother to attend the wedding. Sangram in the warehouse reveals he has taken three consignments of heroin from their rivals and wants to sell them to which tej says no to, soon a shoot-out takes place where they kill two of their rival gang members and Tej realises that and warns his partners that it is not a good idea to mess with the rivals. However Sangram continues his search for the buying party for the heroine during the wedding. The principal from the school calls Aarya and tells her about the gun incident and calls her to the school. Aarya explains to Adi the violence Is never the answer. Aarya and Tej have a fall out because of the gun incident with their son. Sangram when leaving out to take the sample to the buying party, is caught by ACP Khan with the heroine. Jawahar suspects Tej is behind the incident as he opposed the plan of selling Heroin. After the wedding festivities were done, Tej promises Aarya that he will work out a plan to get themselves out of this mess. Next day while going out Tej was shot thrice at his house.
2	2	"Aapko Shaq Hai Kisi Par?"	Ram Madhvani; Sandeep Modi; Vinod Rawat	Sandeep Shrivastava; Anu Singh Choudhary	19 June 2020
Tragedy strikes home. Adding insult to injury, Aarya has to deal with an unforeseen pressure from the police. In the midst of all this, Aarya begins to suspect someone.
3	3	"Kaun Zimmedar Hai?"	Ram Madhvani; Sandeep Modi; Vinod Rawat	Sandeep Shrivastava; Anu Singh Choudhary	19 June 2020
While the family reels in distress, Jawahar warns Aarya about the danger they all are in. When she visits Sangram in the jail, a shock awaits her.
4	4	"Apne Panje Bahar Nikaalo"	Ram Madhvani; Sandeep Modi; Vinod Rawat	Sandeep Shrivastava; Anu Singh Choudhary	19 June 2020
Aarya is threatened by an unknown assailant, which ups her worry about her children's safety, who are dealing with their own problems. But she finds an unlikely ally in Daulat.
5	5	"Kaun Chalaega Business?"	Ram Madhvani; Sandeep Modi; Vinod Rawat	Sandeep Shrivastava; Anu Singh Choudhary	19 June 2020
Danger strikes Aarya and her family once more, and the relentless Khan searches her house yet again. Fed up, Aarya decides to take the bull by the horns and meets Shekhawat.
6	6	"Ek Guru Chahiye"	Ram Madhvani; Sandeep Modi; Vinod Rawat	Sandeep Shrivastava; Anu Singh Choudhary	19 June 2020
As Aarya dives deep into the business, she faces her first challenge. In the meantime, Khan goes after Hina for information, while Jawahar and Daulat get into a scuffle.
7	7	"Aapki Mummy Don Hai"	Ram Madhvani; Sandeep Modi; Vinod Rawat	Sandeep Shrivastava; Anu Singh Choudhary	19 June 2020
The worst has happened and Aarya goes looking for Jawahar. Distressed, she informs Shekhawat about a change in plan, only to find him uncaring. How will she keep her kids safe?
8	8	"Grahan Hai Aaj"	Ram Madhvani; Sandeep Modi; Vinod Rawat	Sandeep Shrivastava; Anu Singh Choudhary	19 June 2020
Aarya shares with Veer and Aru the challenges she has been facing, and promises to end all the suffering with a master plan. Will everything fall into place?
9	9	"Dharm Sankat"	Ram Madhvani; Sandeep Modi; Vinod Rawat	Sandeep Shrivastava; Anu Singh Choudhary	19 June 2020
Despite losing the case, Khan is adamant to find the truth. As another tragedy strikes and the family is in the depths of despair, Aarya is left with a fresh dilemma.

=== Season 2 (2021) ===
No. overall	No. in season	Title	Directed by	Written by	Original release date
10	1	"Mujhe Yahaan Se Bhaagna Hai"	Ram Madhvani; Vinod Rawat; Kapil Sharma	Sanyuktha Chawla Shaikh; Anu Singh Choudhary	10 December 2021
Forced to return to testify against her family, Aarya is caught in a whirlwind of her bloodied past, the one she has been running away from.
11	2	"An Eye for an Eye"	Ram Madhvani; Vinod Rawat; Kapil Sharma	Sanyuktha Chawla Shaikh; Anu Singh Choudhary	10 December 2021
Aarya drowns in the fear of being attacked by her enemies as she tries to find ways to run away from the country. However, someone is keeping an eye on her.
12	3	"Ab Hum Vaapis Jaa Rahe Hein"	Ram Madhvani; Vinod Rawat; Kapil Sharma	Sanyuktha Chawla Shaikh; Anu Singh Choudhary	10 December 2021
Aarya's past returns to help her in restoring normalcy, and her plans to escape seem to be taking shape. But an unexpected event may create new obstacles.
13	4	"Sangram Kahaan Hai?"	Ram Madhvani; Vinod Rawat; Kapil Sharma	Sanyuktha Chawla Shaikh; Anu Singh Choudhary	10 December 2021
Sangram's disappearance becomes a hurdle to Aarya's plans. Meanwhile, Hina reveals something unpleasant to Aarya.
14	5	"300 Crore Ka Consignment"	Ram Madhvani; Vinod Rawat; Kapil Sharma	Sanyuktha Chawla Shaikh; Anu Singh Choudhary	10 December 2021
As another tragedy shakes her family, Aarya is shocked to find the Rs 300 crore consignment returned to her life.
15	6	"I Hate You, Mom"	Ram Madhvani; Vinod Rawat; Kapil Sharma	Sanyuktha Chawla Shaikh; Anu Singh Choudhary	10 December 2021
The Sareen family struggles to stay united. In this true test of time, what will Aarya lose next?
16	7	"Phir Se Panje Bahar Nikaalo"	Ram Madhvani; Vinod Rawat; Kapil Sharma	Sanyuktha Chawla Shaikh; Anu Singh Choudhary	10 December 2021
As Hina spirals in her grief, Aarya is pushed to the brink by the Russians and Shekhawat. Will she seek Daulat's help?
17	8	"Isko Mere Raaste Se Hataa Do"	Ram Madhvani; Vinod Rawat; Kapil Sharma	Sanyuktha Chawla Shaikh; Anu Singh Choudhary	10 December 2021
When an unexpected outcome shakes her conscience, Aarya realises she can't run away from her reality. A final confrontation turns her into someone she never thought she would be.

=== Season 3 (2023-24) ===
No. overall	No. in season	Title	Directed by	Written by	Original release date
18	1	"Kahani Abhi Khatam Nahi Hui Hain"	Ram Madhvani; Vinod Rawat; Kapil Sharma	Sanyuktha Chawla Shaikh; Anu Singh Choudhary	3 November 2023
In her quest to safeguard her children, Aarya, the crime lord, is determined to achieve absolute dominance over the drug trade. However, she faces formidable challenges in the form of a vengeance-driven vendetta and Khan's relentless pursuit.
19	2	"Galti Ki Saza Maut"	Ram Madhvani; Vinod Rawat; Kapil Sharma	Sanyuktha Chawla Shaikh; Anu Singh Choudhary	3 November 2023
Aarya finds herself confronted with an agonizing dilemma: she must choose between safeguarding her son's romantic relationship and shielding her family from the Russians' threats. Simultaneously, Sooraj resorts to brutal methods, subjecting Roop to torture in his relentless pursuit to bring about Aarya's downfall.
20	3	"Sherni Ka Shikar"	Ram Madhvani; Vinod Rawat; Kapil Sharma	Sanyuktha Chawla Shaikh; Anu Singh Choudhary	3 November 2023
Aarya faces a dire situation with the menacing heroin suppliers, Nalini Sahiba and Abhimanyu, who issue a grave threat unless the consignment is recovered. As she embarks on her mission to track down Sooraj, she grapples with challenges from both her sons and Khan.
21	4	"Bali Ya Balidaan"	Ram Madhvani; Vinod Rawat; Kapil Sharma	Sanyuktha Chawla Shaikh; Anu Singh Choudhary	3 November 2023
Sooraj's relentless pursuit to locate Nandini's remains drives him to extreme measures. Meanwhile, Veer, Maya, Aarya, and Sooraj become entangled in a web of vengeance and remorse, binding them together in unexpected ways.

== Production ==
=== Pre-production ===
In late 2011, Ram Madhvani was reported to adapt the Dutch drama series Penoza as a feature film in collaboration with Endemol Shine Group. In August 2014, Madhvani approached Kajol to play the lead protagonist, who initially accepted after reading the script, and Ajay Devgn's production house Ajay Devgn FFilms, backed the project on the very same month. The film initially touted to be Kajol's return to Hindi films after four years, since her last release in 2010, However, due to financial reasons, Kajol opted out of the project and Madhvani later approached Madhuri Dixit and Kareena Kapoor, to play the lead, but neither of the actress were finalized. In May 2016, Madhvani decided to revive the project with Aishwarya Rai Bachchan, who was initially approached for the film, before finalising Kajol. However, filming got shelved a month before its start.

=== Development ===
On 15 January 2019, the streaming platform Hotstar, announced its foray to original content production exclusively for the service, with STAR India, the parent company of Hotstar, tied up with 15 Indian filmmakers including Madhvani for creating the shows for its label called Hotstar Specials. Madhvani, later approached Sushmita Sen to play the protagonist, which was later titled as Aarya. The series marked Sushmita's comeback to films after a 10-year hiatus, and also marked her debut in digital platforms.

=== Casting and characters ===
Sushmita Sen plays the role of Aarya Sareen, a strong woman who is ready to take bold steps in order to save and protect her family. Chandrachur Singh in Aarya plays the role of Tej Sareen, whom Aarya trusts the most. His business is named as Aaryasattava Pharmaceuticals which is a front of a big illegal business of transporting medical drugs. Sikander Kher plays the role of Daulat, who is the right-hand man of Aarya's father Zorawar. Sikander stated "Daulat is very protective about Aarya and is incredibly loyal to the family. You could say he is almost like the foot soldier of the family. He stays by her side and tries to protect her from whatever comes her way." In an interview with International Business Times, Namit Das stated "I play the character of Jawahar, and he has a lot of complexities in him he is one of the most greyish characters I have ever played in my career. Only after the completion of the shoot, I understood that he (my role) has a lot of prominence in the show. There are so many layers to the character." Jayant Kripalani plays the role of Zorawar, Aarya's father. Sohaila Kapur plays the role of Aarya's mother, while Viren Vazirani, Virti Vaghani and Pratyaksh Panwar appear as Aarya's children.

=== Filming ===
The principal photography of the series started on 9 December 2019 at Jaipur in Rajasthan. A production unit stated that Sushmita had undergone more than 30 look tests for her role in the show. The shooting of the film took place across Jaipur, Udaipur, Mumbai and Palgadh, and the show creators chose real locations instead of building sets. Some other scenes involving the court, jail and factories were shot in Mumbai, and the team selected locations that could pass off as modern-day Jaipur.

The Zorawar Haveli, which belonged to Zorawar (Jayant Kripalani's character) was recreated at the Chomu Palace Hotel situated near Jaipur, where the wedding scenes been shot. Production designer Anna Ipe stated We shot in different sections of the complex, in a way that one would normally not see in films. A lot of details were taken care of during the propping of the spaces. He has things collected from a time gone by, and is also a hunter. Hence the use of dark wood tones and warm leather gave a kind of masculinity to the space."

Ipe, stated about the picturisation of Aarya's home in Mumbai, which was completely different from the Zorawar Haveli. "We took an empty shell, and converted it into a fully functional home for Aarya’s family. The most important thing was to ensure that the home was a reconstruction of the past of these five individuals, each with their own unique personalities." The character Maya's eclectic home was shot at the Avatar Bungalow in Mumbai.

The series have been shot using 360 degree format. The format entails using multiple cameras to capture a scene at once, and freeing actors of shot and angle restrictions. This also makes it important to design things that are not seen on camera. Production on the show was wrapped on 15 March 2020.

=== Post-production ===
The post-production works were started in March 2020, before the COVID-19 pandemic lockdown in India. All the editing, VFX, sound mixing and dubbing has been done from team's respective homes. In an interview with Film Companion, Madhvani stated "It is an Excel Sheet Nightmare as the team has to go through a scheduled Excel sheet to check if they have done that work or not everyday". According to Madhvani a team of 50 people worked on the post production 18 hours a day and had connected through Zoom or Google Meet for the collaboration and lags had been a big issue for them to judge the sound correctly. Dubbing has been also a major issue according to Madhvani as the cast were scattered throughout the globe. Jayant Kripalani was in Kolkata dubbing for his role during Cyclone Amphan, and Namit Das stated that he "started dubbing at 3 am when all his dogs were quiet".

=== Music ===
The use of the Bhagavad Gita is in the climax juxtaposed with the headspace of Aarya (Sushmita Sen) who is at crossroads at that point where she is delving with betrayal from her family, and this symbolic use of shlokas with the analogy between Mahabharat and Aarya's character, struggling between her Dharam towards the family and her Karam, this was an idea conceived from the very start of the show,

— Vishal Khurana, on the composition of "The Bhagavd Gita Song" in an interview with Indo Asian News Service

Aarya

Soundtrack album by Vishal Khurana
- Released: 25 June 2020
- Recorded: 2020
- Genre: Soundtrack
- Length: 36:35
- Language: Hindi
- Label: Disney+ Hotstar
- Producer: Vishal Khurana

Vishal Khurana chronology
Haraamkhor (2015)	Aarya (2020)	Dhamaka (2021)

The original score of Aarya is composed by Vishal Khurana K, who previously worked with Ram Madhvani in Neerja (2016), and was co-produced by Siddhanth Madhvani. "The Bhagavad Gita Song" which is inspired from the Bhagavad Gita, was the only song featured in the series, which was sung by Siddharth Basrur, Delraaz Bunshah, Anurag Panwar, with a rap portion done by actress Virti Vaghani. The original soundtrack was released on 25 June 2020, through streaming platforms. The soundtrack features eight instrumental compositions. Vishal stated "The entire soundtrack of Aarya is based on an emotion of tragedy and depicts the ominous fear that is always looming around the central characters. The approach to the soundtrack for 'Aarya' was thematic, trying to cover a wide variety of musical styles in the different themes, yet staying within the zone of the show. The use of Indian ethnic instruments is to add the rooted and cultural element to the themes, but these sounds have been played around with and distorted to keep it modern and in line with the show's urban tonality."

The thematic use of the song "Bade Achche Lage Hain", from the 1976 film Balika Vadhu, received praise from viewers. It was released through the official YouTube channel of Disney+ Hotstar on 5 July 2020. Commenting about the song, director Ram Madhvani stated in an interview with Film Companion, that "We have used the song in the script keeping in mind that Tej's (Chandrachur Singh) character loves old Hindi music. This song is an absolute hit with viewers of all ages for its nostalgic and sentimental value. It is mellifluous and brings out so many emotions, the writer-director said in a statement.We wanted to strike an emotional chord with the audience with this music and decided to make it stand out by using it in a diametrically opposite fashion to the actual scene."

No.	Title	Singer(s)	Length
1.	"The Bhagavd Gita Song"	Vishal Khurana K, Siddharth Basrur, Delraaz Bunshah, Anurag Panwar, Virti Vaghani	7:41
2.	"Aarya's Theme"	Vishal Khurana K, Siddhanth Madhvani	4:19
3.	"Eclipse"	Vishal Khurana K, Siddhanth Madhvani	2:39
4.	"Shekhawat's Theme"	Vishal Khurana K, Siddhanth Madhvani	4:13
5.	"Suspicion"	Vishal Khurana K, Siddhanth Madhvani	3:19
6.	"Family Theme"	Vishal Khurana K, Siddhanth Madhvani	3:53
7.	"Conflict"	Vishal Khurana K, Siddhanth Madhvani	4:55
8.	"Veer and Pallavi's Theme"	Vishal Khurana K, Siddhanth Madhvani	2:06
9.	"Aarya-Tej's Love Theme"	Vishal Khurana K, Siddhanth Madhvani	3:28
Total length:			36:35

== Release ==
The series was eventually reported for a release on 29 March 2020, on Hotstar concurrent with the launch of Disney+ in India through its corporate sibling. However, the release was postponed due to post-production delays, and also the launch of Disney+ Hotstar, which scheduled to coincide with the 2020 Indian Premier League, delayed as the event got pushed due to the COVID-19 pandemic in India (eventually launched on 3 April 2020). In April 2020, the makers announced for a release in June 2020, as the post-production works may take two months to complete. The first look of the series was launched on 3 June 2020, followed by the trailer on 5 June. The series was premiered on Disney+ Hotstar on 19 June 2020. On 6 September 2020, the show was released in 6 different languages – Tamil, Telugu, Bengali, Malayalam, Marathi and Kannada.

On 1 September 2021, the series became available to stream on Hulu as part of the migration of Hotstar content to Hulu in the US.

== Reception ==
=== Critical response ===
The series received mostly positive response from critics, with Sushmita Sen's performance was praised by critics. Rahul Desai from Film Companion said, "Sen is the pivot of an excellent cast that, despite a brief lull in the middle overs, maintains the rhythm. The narrative fleetingly dips its toes into the hidden homes of each character. This gives each of the talented actors – otherwise underutilized by the Hindi-film ecosystem – a chance to shine." Shubhra Gupta, from The Indian Express, gave a rating of three out of five saying, "For the most part, Aarya stays on course, taut, unpredictable, pacey and enjoyable." Udita Jhunjhunwala from Firspost rated three-and-a-half out of five stars and said that, "The tone and themes of the show will resonate with those familiar with Ozark, Narcos, Breaking Bad, and, of course, Penoza, as it enters the inner sanctum of a business house with a crooked moral compass. Yet you feel strongly for this family that stays together through the crisis, making smart and foolish moves, captained by a woman who just does not give up." Pallabi Dey Purkayastha of The Times of India, rated three out of five saying, "Barring the dearth of a few much-needed Jump Cuts and Match Cuts, ‘Aarya’ stands out for reasons more than one."

Saibal Chatterjee of NDTV gave two-and-a-half out of five and stated "Sushmita Sen holds the series together with her natural ability to fill every frame with her commanding presence." Stutee Ghosh of The Quint, gave three out of five and stated "There is no denying that the world that is created is enigmatic and seduces the audience, things would have been far more enjoyable if it has been a little more pruned. Nevertheless, Aarya still has a lot going for it. watching Sushmita Sen bustle through her troubles with passionate ease is definitely of one of them." Sowmya Srivatsava of Hindustan Times commented "Aarya makes for an easy, binge-able watch that might test your patience here and there—they do show someone running up the entire staircase rather than cutting to the next scene. But persevere, and ye shall find yourself a thriller you want to stay with till the end." Nandini Ramanth of Scroll.in opined "There are many moments when Aarya feels like a very gorgeously packaged and overpriced grocery staple. Many scenes are stretched beyond repair, and the emotional moments seem overdirected."

The Hindu's Kenneth Rosario reviewed "The show, by no means, is extraordinary, yet it keeps you interested in the characters and their lives, and emerges as a good example of basic storytelling done right." India Today's Divyanshi Sharma commented "The show ends on an intriguing note, making us eager for the second season already." Raja Sen of Mint stated "The show's pulp plot could engage in itself, but Aarya focuses on its central character's motivations and limitations rather than her force". Tanul Thakur of The Wire reviewed "Aarya is a good example of solid genre fiction. It defines its goals right at the start — of being a racy, compelling thriller — and stays true to them. It may not be as ‘deep’, but it's consistently satisfying." Saraswati Datar of The News Minute reviewed "Watch Aarya for Sushmita Sen and a refreshingly new take on crime stories that have for long been a male-dominated genre. But most importantly watch it because a show with a woman and a mother of three as its protagonist is a rare treat in itself, even on a digital platform." Aishwarya Vasudevan of Daily News and Analysis commented "Aarya is watchable but predictable, which can be touted as a mini-series with a complete justice done to the story and each character as well."

=== Accolades ===
Year	Award	Category	Nominee	Result	Ref.
2020	Filmfare OTT Awards	Best Drama Series	Aarya	Nominated	
2020	Filmfare OTT Awards	Best Actor – Female	Sushmita Sen	Won	
2020	Filmfare OTT Awards	Best Supporting Actress – Female (Critics)	Maya Sarao	Nominated	
2020	Filmfare OTT Awards	Best Background Music	Vishal Khurana K	Nominated	
2020	Filmfare OTT Awards	Best Original Soundtrack	Vishal Khurana K	Nominated	
2020	Filmfare OTT Awards	Best Art Direction	Anna Ipe	Nominated	
2020	Filmfare OTT Awards	Best Costume Designer	Theia Tekchandani	Nominated	
2020	Filmfare OTT Awards	Best Editing	Khushboo Raj and Abhimanyu Chaudhary	Nominated	
2021	International Emmy Awards	Best Drama Series	Aarya	Nominated	
