= Samay: When Time Strikes =

2003 Hindi film

- Theatrical release poster
- Directed by: Robbie Grewal
- Screenplay by: Robbie Grewal; Sameer Kohli
- Story by: Robbie Grewal; Sameer Kohli
- Starring: Sushmita Sen; Jackie Shroff; Dinesh Lamba; Sushant Singh; Barkha Singh
- Cinematography: K. U. Mohanan
- Edited by: Aarif Sheikh
- Music by: Sandeep Chowta
- Distributed by: iDream Productions
- Release date: 10 October 2003
- Country: India
- Language: Hindi

Samay: When Time Strikes is a 2003 Indian Hindi-language thriller film directed by Robbie Grewal. It starred Sushmita Sen and Sushant Singh.

== Plot ==
ACP Malvika Chauhan is a widowed cop with a 10-year-old daughter. She is saddled with the murder case of a reputed businessman, where the killer has left no evidence. Before she could begin the investigation, a famous actress is murdered. Malvika suspects that it might be the work of a serial killer.

The investigation reveals that the victims were not connected with each other. Plus, even the suspects with motives were not near the crime scenes. Suddenly Malvika realizes that somebody is stalking her. Malvika accosts her stalker, but he reveals that he was just doing it for a criminal named Suleman Bhai. As Suleman has previous experience in murdering without leaving evidence, Malvika assumes she has found a suspect for at least one case. But when Malvika goes to Suleman's house, she finds Suleman dead.

Again out of leads, Malvika starts going through the case files of all 3 victims. She finds 4 connections:

1. All were the best people in their fields.
2. All had poor eyesight with eye power of -2.
3. All ordered their glasses from the same shop.
4. The position of their hands on the crime scene indicated their time of death (12 am, 3 pm, and 6 pm).

When Malvika goes to the shop to investigate, the assistant says that her eyesight is perfect, but her vision is very weak. Malvika does not realize what he means, but after learning that the assistant did not turn up that day, she realizes that she talked with the potential killer (whom she could not see, as the room was dark). Later, she finds out from the list of customers that a person named Amod Parekh, also with eye power -2, visited the same optical shop on the days when all three murdered persons visited the shop, and believes him to be the killer.

A frustrated Malvika sends her associate Satya to investigate the whereabouts of the killer, while she tries to figure out who the next target is. She finds that a renowned musician, who also has a power of -2, is the customer of the shop and is performing the same evening. Malvika arranges for a tight security, but the musician is not killed by the killer even after the given time (9 pm).

Meanwhile, Malvika's associate finds out the killer's address. Amod reveals himself to Malvika in front of the musician. Amod explains that he was also a graduate from the '94 batch of the police academy, the same batch from which Malvika graduated. He explains that his credentials were much better than Malvika's, but he was toppled, as he had poor eyesight with power -2.

Amod vents out his anger by saying that this same fault did not affect the lives of his victims, in fact, they became famous. He also goes on to say that he did not want to kill them, but time was not on their side as somebody else, too had a motive to kill them. Malvika thinks that he is trying to prove that she has lost, and he has proved himself a genius, if not as a cop, then as a killer.

Malvika asks why Amod did not kill the musician. Suddenly her associate arrives with a broken pair of glasses retrieved from Amod's house. Amod tells her that her daughter was the perfect daughter of the best cop. He clarifies that he killed her daughter instead (9 pm), who also has an eyesight power of -2 and came to the same optical shop in the same evening. He again taunts Malvika that her eyesight is perfect, but her vision is very weak as she didn't notice her daughter's name in the customers' list. Malvika's associate begs her not to kill the killer, as he wants her to do the same. However, an angry Malvika shoots the killer dead (12 am).

== Cast ==
- Sushmita Sen as ACP Malvika Chauhan
- Sushant Singh as Inspector Satya Anand
- Jackie Shroff as Amod Parekh (Guest Appearance)
- Rajesh Khera as Postmortem Doctor
- Dinesh Lamba as Sub Inspector Rafique
- Shishir Sharma as Police Commissioner
- Tushar Dalvi as Dr. Ravi Ghatge
- Barkha Singh as Anjali Chauhan
- Deepak Dobriyal as Production Designer on Film Set
- Lucy Bartholomew as Rithika Sabhrawal
- Mona Ghosh Shetty as Namrata Sharma, Sandhya's Sister

== Soundtrack ==
The album's music was composed by Sandeep Chowta, with lyrics penned by Abbas Tyrewala.

- "Aaj Ki Raat": Sneha Pant
- "Jab Andhera Hota Hai": Vaishali Samant
- "Laila Laila": Sowmya Raoh
- "Last Clue": Instrumental
- "Zindagi": Sowmya Raoh
- "Losing To Win" (Zindagi Reprise)
- "Man Hunt": Instrumental
- "The Chase": Instrumental
- "The Theme": Instrumental

== Reception ==
Anupama Chopra of India Today wrote, "Sen, in sombre clothes and steely attitude, is compelling. But unfortunately, it isn't enough." Taran Adarsh of IndiaFM gave the film 1.5 out of 5, writing, "On the whole, SAMAY - WHEN TIME STRIKES doesn't 'strike' due to a weak climax mainly, which is the backbone of any suspense-thriller. With no hype or publicity to back up, its 'samay' at the box-office will be limited." Kulvinder S Bhutani of Rediff.com wrote, "The climax is a direct take from the Hollywood film, Seven, starring Brad Pitt, Morgan Freeman and Kevin Spacey. Do not watch Samay if you have seen Seven because there will not be a surprise element when the killer makes an appearance. But the logic behind the murders is not convincing. The murderer's dialogue delivery is also not very articulate."

Aarif Sheikh won National Film Award for Best Editing at 51st National Film Awards.
