= Bas Itna Sa Khwaab Hai =

2001 film by Goldie Behl

- Directed by: Goldie Behl
- Screenplay by: Goldie Behl; Shrishti Arya; Manu Chopra
- Dialogues by: Tigmanshu Dhulia
- Produced by: Goldie Behl; Madhu Ramesh Behl
- Starring: Abhishek Bachchan; Rani Mukerji; Sushmita Sen; Jackie Shroff
- Cinematography: Sameer Arya
- Edited by: Sanjay Sankla
- Music by: Aadesh Shrivastava
- Production company: Rose Movies
- Distributed by: Eros Entertainment
- Release date: 6 July 2001
- Running time: 169 minutes
- Country: India
- Language: Hindi

Bas Itna Sa Khwaab Hai (transl. It's just a small dream) is a 2001 Indian Hindi-language romantic thriller film written and directed by Goldie Behl. The film stars Abhishek Bachchan, Sushmita Sen, Rani Mukerji, and Jackie Shroff.

== Plot ==
Suraj is a simple village man who comes to Mumbai from Benaras to earn a degree in college. He gets smitten by a light-eyed beauty Pooja. After some dilly-dallying, the duo expresses their love for each other.

Suraj has big dreams. He wants to emulate his mentor Naved Ali, a shrewd media baron. Then one day, in a heroic deed Suraj saves the life of a fatally wounded man, impressing Naved Ali. A flattered Naved sends his raunchy colleague Lara (Sushmita Sen) to rope in Suraj to start a new channel.

Slowly the callow youth becomes a clever businessman and Lara begins to take Pooja’s place. Pooja tries to convince Suraj of the futility of it all but only in vain. Suraj is determined to carve a place for himself in the higher echelons of society. Soon he has everything he ever wanted and dreamed of – a swanky bungalow, sleek cars, etc. But he has lost his innocence.

And one day Suraj realizes the dastardly motives of Naved Ali, who wants to become the PM of the country, and how he has been used as a pawn in his power game.

== Cast ==
- Abhishek Bachchan as Surajchand "Suraj" Shrivastav
- Rani Mukerji as Pooja
- Sushmita Sen as Lara Oberoi
- Jackie Shroff as Naved Ali
- Gulshan Grover as Sardar Sweety Singh
- Anang Desai as Chandan Shrivastav, Suraj's father
- Smita Jaykar as Mrs. Gayetri Shrivastav, Suraj's mother
- Himani Shivpuri as Gayetri's sister-in-law
- Sharat Saxena as Balkishan Deshpande
- Jennifer Kotwal as Suraj's sister
- Suchitra Pillai-Malik as Sangeeta Chopra
- Karan Razdan as Chandan's brother
- Shiva Kumar as Police Commissioner
- Rahul Singh as Suraj's friend
- Puneet Vashist as Suraj's friend
- Anupam Shyam

== Soundtrack ==
Bas Itna Sa Khawab Hai

Soundtrack album by Aadesh Shrivastav
- Released: 7 March 2001
- Genre: Feature film soundtrack
- Language: Hindi
- Label: Universal Music Group

All songs were composed by Aadesh Shrivastav. The lyrics were written by Goldie Behl except for one song each by Dev Kohli and Nida Fazli.

No.	Title	Artist(s)	Length
1.	"Yeh Hawaye Julfo Me Teree Gum Ho Jaye"	Shaan, Alka Yagnik
2.	"Chhota Sa Mann Hai, Mann Me Sanam Hai"	Alka Yagnik, Roop Kumar Rathod, KK
3.	"Kuchh Aisa Jahan Ham Banaye"	Alka Yagnik, Shaan
4.	"Dil Nasheen"	Shaan, Sukhwinder Singh, Hema Sardesai
5.	"Hey Ganga Maiya Too Jana Hame Nahee Re"	Sonu Nigam
6.	"Jhoomen Yeh Zameen"	Roop Kumar Rathod
7.	"Kya Huwa Kaho Naa Kaho"	Alka Yagnik, Shaan

== Controversy ==
The Delhi Police arrested film producer Tanya Behl on charges of assaulting two city photographers during the shooting of the film.
