= Karma Aur Holi =

- Theatrical release poster
- Directed by: Manish Gupta
- Written by: Manish Gupta; Marcus Guillory
- Produced by: Drena De Niro; Prashanth Shah
- Starring: Randeep Hooda; Sushmita Sen; Naomi Campbell; Suresh Oberoi; Suchitra Krishnamoorthy
- Cinematography: Lisa Leone
- Edited by: Chandan Arora
- Music by: Raju Singh; Nusrat Fateh Ali Khan; Abrar-ul-Haq
- Production companies: Saregama Entertainment; Rapture Productions; Puja Entertainment Ltd.
- Distributed by: Reliance Entertainment (India); Warner Bros. Pictures (International)
- Release date: 6 March 2009 (India)
- Running time: 110 minutes
- Country: India
- Language: Hindi

Karma Aur Holi is a 2009 Indian drama film written and directed by Manish Gupta. The film stars Randeep Hooda and Sushmita Sen in the lead roles.

== Plot ==
The film revolves around an NRI couple, desperate to have a biological child. The couple hosts a party to celebrate Holi with Indian and American guests, including a black girl. The plot deals with the events happening further.

== Cast ==
- Randeep Hooda as Dev Kohli
- Sushmita Sen as Meera D. Kohli
- Deepal Shaw as Preeti Kolhapure
- Naomi Campbell as Jennifer Bogtstra, a black girl who comes from Africa.
- Suresh Oberoi as Shekhar Khanna
- Rati Agnihotri as Vani Tendulkar
- Suchitra Krishnamoorthy as Sujata

== Soundtrack ==
The film's music was composed by Raju Singh with lyrics from Sameer Pandey. It also features cover versions of Nusrat Fateh Ali Khan's "Jism Dhamakta" which was originally written by Javed Akhtar.

| No. | Title | Lyrics | Music | Singer(s) | Length |
|---|---|---|---|---|---|
| 1. | "Aayi Aayi Holi" | Sameer | Raju Singh | Jai Mohan, Sonu Nigam, Sunidhi Chauhan | 6:58 |
| 2. | "Jism Dhamakta" | Javed Akhtar | Nusrat Fateh Ali Khan, Abrar ul Haq | Kunal Ganjawala | 7:38 |
| 3. | "Jism Dhamakta- Remix 1" | Javed Akhtar | Raju Singh, Nusrat Fateh Ali Khan | Nusrat Fateh Ali Khan | 4:28 |
| 4. | "Jism Dhamakta- Remix 2" | Javed Akhtar | Raju Singh, Nusrat Fateh Ali Khan | Nusrat Fateh Ali Khan | 4:58 |
| Total length: | | | | | 24:04 |
