= Filhaal =

2002 Indian film by Meghna Gulzar

- DVD cover
- Directed by: Meghna Gulzar
- Written by: Meghna Gulzar
- Produced by: Jhamu Sughand
- Starring: Sushmita Sen; Tabu; Sanjay Suri; Palash Sen
- Cinematography: Manmohan Singh
- Edited by: Chandan Arora
- Music by: Songs: Anu Malik; Score: Anjan Biswas
- Production company: Sughand Films
- Release date: 1 February 2002
- Language: Hindi

Filhaal (transl. Momentary) is a 2002 Indian Hindi-language romantic drama film directed by Meghna Gulzar, in her directorial debut. It stars Sanjay Suri, Tabu, Sushmita Sen and Palash Sen. The film received positive reviews from critics, who especially praised the performance of Sushmita Sen, who was nominated for the Filmfare Award for Best Supporting Actress.

== Plot ==
Rewa Singh and Sia Sheth are best friends. Having grown up together, the pair is inseparable and always there for each other. However, they are very different when it comes to what they want from life. Rewa is family-oriented; she does not have a boyfriend and is committed to building her own stable family after marriage. Sia is a free spirit and lives life on her own terms. She has a boyfriend, Sahil, who has proposed marriage to her three times, but she has turned him down, saying that her career is more important at present and she will think of marriage later. Yet Sahil is determined to marry her and nobody else.

Through her family, Rewa meets Dhruv and marries him. Both of them want to start a family, but they soon find out that Rewa is unable to conceive. Rewa is devastated; Dhruv is very supportive but himself upset at the news. Indeed, Dhruv's stoicism and nobility make Rewa feel even more incomplete and empty, and she becomes depressed.

Sia cannot bear to see her friend like this and offers a solution – she offers to become a surrogate mother to their child. Dhruv is horrified at the idea and strongly opposes Sia bearing the child, pointing to various problems, including emotionally complicating all of their lives. But the girls' insistence finally manages to sway him as well as their respective parents. Sia's pregnancy's news is also too much for even the ever-docile Sahil, who learns of it only after she is already pregnant and hence breaks off the relationship with Sia.

Rewa and Dhruv do everything to make sure that Sia takes care of herself and the baby stays healthy. However, cracks between Rewa and Sia begin to surface. Rewa is jealous that Dhruv is spending more time with Sia and is frustrated as she is not able to experience the joy of carrying a child. Rewa begins to lash out at Sia as the pregnancy begins taking a toll on her personal and professional life. Things come to a head when Sia decorates the baby's room while Rewa yells at her, telling her that she no longer wants the baby as it does not feel hers.

After a few complications, Sia gives birth to a baby girl and, as promised, hands her over to Rewa, repairing their relationship. Rewa accepts that both women's roles in her child's life are equally important, as she puts on a necklace with both Sia and Rewa's names around her baby's neck, similar to the ones both of them have been wearing for years.

The story ends on a happy note. Sahil rekindles his relationship with Sia and again proposes marriage. This time, she accepts.

== Cast ==
- Tabu as Rewa Singh
- Sushmita Sen as Sia Sheth
- Sanjay Suri as Dhruv Malhotra
- Palash Sen as Sahil
- Akash Khurana as Mr. Sheth
- Shivaji Satam as Dr. Surve

== Soundtrack ==
The Music and Background score was composed by Anu Malik. The background score was composed by Anjan Biswas. All the lyrics were penned by Gulzar. The album opened to positive reviews and Planet Bollywood rated 9/10.

Track Listing
No.	Title	Singer(s)	Length
1.	"Filhaal"	Asha Bhosle	5:27
2.	"Dil Ke Sannate"	Palash Sen	5:30
3.	"Kyun Baar Baar"	K.S.Chithra	5:48
4.	"Le Chale Doliyon Mein"	Roop Kumar Rathod and K.S.Chithra	7:00
5.	"Sola Singaar Kar"	Palash Sen and Jaspinder Narula	4:28
6.	"Naya Naya"	KK and K.S.Chithra	6:30
7.	"Filhaal"	Instrumental	4:43

== Reception ==
Dinesh Raheja of Rediff.com wrote, "As I shuffled my feet while making way out of the theatre, the first thought after watching Filhaal was: It would be interesting to see what Meghna Gulzar could do with a fresher subject. She has promise. All she needs is a more original premise." Radhika Rajamani of The Hindu wrote "he feel is modern- production wise it is slick. Anu Malik's music is good but too many songs detract the narrative. Manmohan Singh's camera is able to capture the myriad hues of life and color well. Performances on the mainstay of the film. The casting is certainly appropriate. It goes without saying that Tabu has done well. But it is the sterling performance (best up to date) of Sushmita Sen, which endears. Sanjay Suri and Palash Sen fit in well. An earnest attempt." Manish Gajjar of BBC.com wrote "This is one of the very few classy movies from Bollywood which has been made with great intellect, style and conviction! It is a definite must-see!"

Tiasa Bhowal in her retrospective review for India Today wrote, ″Filhaal was a breath of fresh air, but the audience of almost two decades ago was not ready to accept a film that tried to normalise surrogacy, something that was considered taboo. Despite the film garnering appreciation from the critics, the response at the box office was lukewarm.″
