= Sushmita Sen =

Indian actress (born 1975)

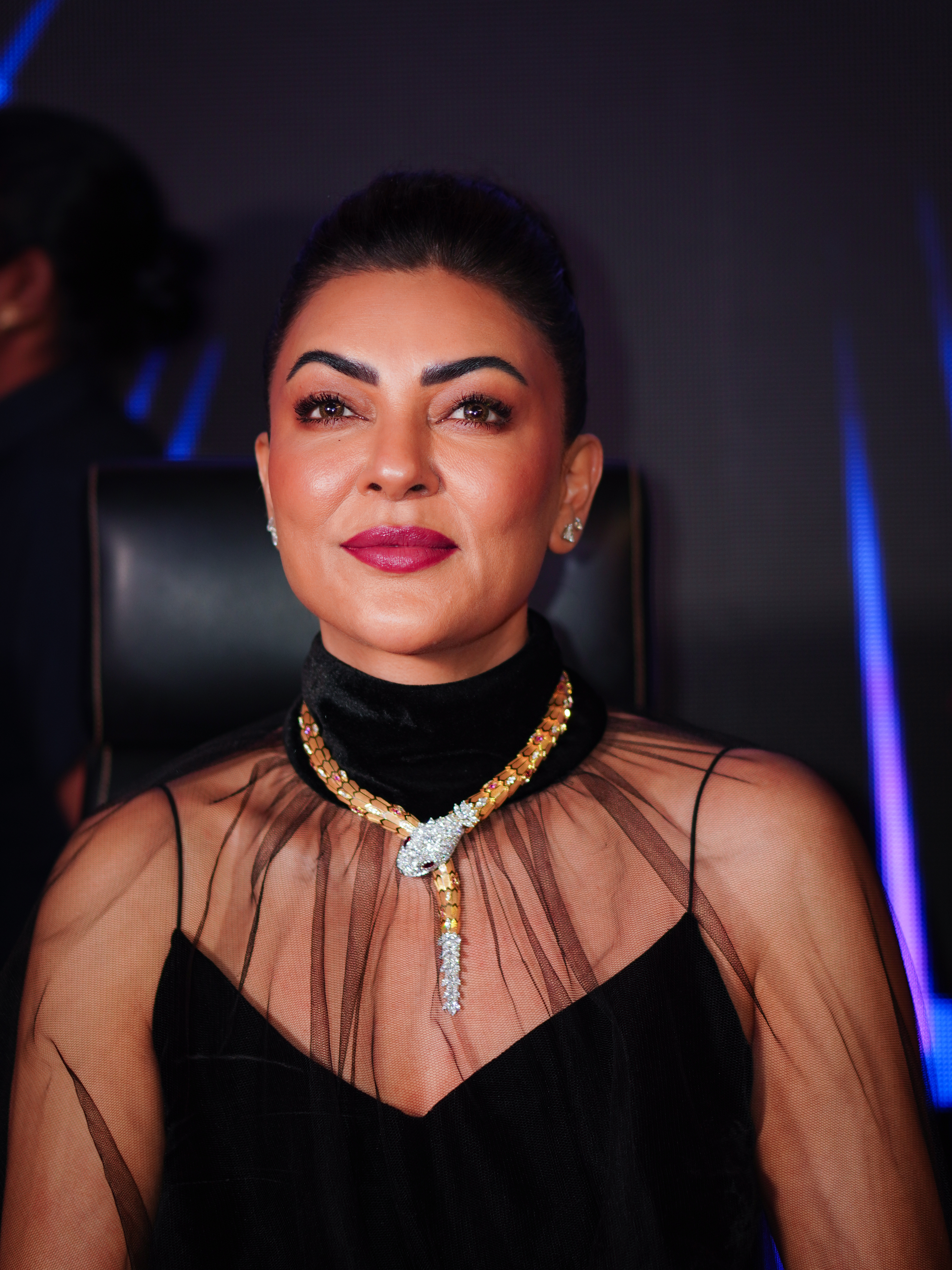
- Sushmita Sen at Miss Universe India 2026
- Born: 19 November 1975 (age 50); Hyderabad, Andhra Pradesh, India
- Occupation: Actress
- Years active: 1994–present
- Works: Full list
- Title: Femina Miss India 1994; Miss Universe 1994
- Children: 2

Sushmita Sen (Bengali pronunciation: [ʃuʃmita ʃen]; born 19 November 1975) is an Indian actress and beauty pageant titleholder, who was crowned Miss Universe 1994, becoming the first Indian woman to win the Miss Universe title. Sen has since predominantly worked in Hindi films, and is a recipient of a Filmfare Award and a Filmfare OTT Award.

Sen made her acting debut playing a fictionalised version of herself in the thriller Dastak (1996). She won the Filmfare Award for Best Supporting Actress for her performance as the girlfriend of a married man in the comedy film Biwi No.1 (1999), and was also nominated in the category for her roles in the dramas Sirf Tum (1999) and Filhaal... (2002). Her other commercially successful films were Aankhen (2002), Main Hoon Na (2004), and Maine Pyaar Kyun Kiya? (2005). After a career downturn and hiatus, Sen starred in the drama series Aarya (2020–2024), winning a Filmfare OTT Award, and portrayed transgender activist Shreegauri Sawant in the miniseries Taali (2023).

== Early life & education ==
Sen was born on 19 November 1975, to a Bengali Baidya family in Hyderabad, Andhra Pradesh, India to Shubeer Sen, a former Indian Air Force Wing Commander, and Subhra Sen, a jewellery designer and owner of a Dubai-based store. She has a younger brother, Rajeev Sen, who was married to television actress Charu Asopa.

Sen attended the Air Force Golden Jubilee Institute in New Delhi, and St. Ann's High School in Secunderabad. She enrolled in a bachelor's degree in Political Science in the 2007–08 academic session at the School of Open Learning, Delhi University, but withdrew her admission later. She did not pursue any further higher education.

In January 2026, Sen received doctorate degree from Invertis University, Bareilly during 12th convocation ceremony held at the campus of the University.

== Pageantry ==
In 1994, at the age of 18 Sen entered and won the title Femina Miss India, earning the right to compete at the Miss Universe 1994 contest.

At the Miss Universe contest held in Pasay, Philippines, Sen ranked third overall in the preliminaries, behind Miss Colombia Carolina Gómez and Miss Venezuela Minorka Mercado. Sen went on to place second, fifth and third in the subsequent rounds and finally won the title and crown of Miss Universe 1994.

After the Times Group relinquished the rights to choose the Indian representative to Miss Universe, Sen's project, I Am She – Miss Universe India, took over, running it for three years (2010–2012). This was followed by Femina taking over.

=== Miss Universe judge 2016 ===
In January 2016, Sen appeared as one of the judges of Miss Universe 2016 at the Mall of Asia Arena, Pasay, Metro Manila, Philippines. Joining her as judges were Cynthia Bailey, Mickey Boardman, Francine LaFrak, Miss Universe 2011 Leila Lopes, and Miss Universe 1993 Dayanara Torres.

== Acting career ==
=== Debut and breakthrough (1996–2000) ===
After her reign as Miss Universe, Sen ventured into the Hindi film industry. Her first film was in 1996, the thriller Dastak, in which she played the victim of a stalker, played by Sharad Kapoor. It was the most expensive Indian film at the time of its release. In 1998, she played a low-profile reporter opposite Sunny Deol in Zor, a box office failure.

In 1999, Sen earned wider recognition with her portrayal of Rupali Walia in David Dhawan's comedy film Biwi No.1, alongside Salman Khan and Karisma Kapoor. It received positive reviews from critics and emerged as the second highest-grossing movie of 1999. Syed Firdaus Ashraf of Rediff.com noted, "Sen has tried hard to make a mark in a different role, but her role itself isn't worth remembering." She won the Filmfare Award for Best Supporting Actress for her performance in the film. The same year, she received a second nomination for the Filmfare Award for Best Supporting Actress for her performance as Aarti in the romantic drama Sirf Tum. For this performance, Sharmila Taliculam of Rediff.com termed her the, "star of the film". Her last film of the year was Hindustan Ki Kasam opposite Ajay Devgn. The film was an average grosser, despite taking a bumper opening.

Her only film in 2000, Aaghaaz saw her playing a police officer, opposite Suniel Shetty. Anjali Abrol of Planet Bollywood stated that Sen did "decently well" in her role.

=== Career progression (2001–2005) ===
In 2001, she first appeared opposite Govinda in the fantasy comedy Kyo Kii... Main Jhuth Nahin Bolta. Her second film of the year, Bas Itna Sa Khwaab Hai, was a disaster at the box office.

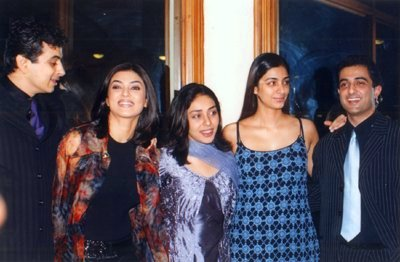
Sen (second from left) with the co-stars of her movie Filhaal in 2002

Sen received critical acclaim for her roles in 2002. Her first film of the year Aankhen saw her play a teacher, opposite Arjun Rampal and Akshay Kumar, was a critical success and the second-highest-grossing film of 2002. Priya Ganapati of Rediff.com noted, "Sushmita Sen's role of Neha deserves an extra round of applause. Neha doesn't need a man to exist. She is intelligent and capable, even during the climax." She next appeared in the action thriller Tumko Na Bhool Paayenge opposite Salman Khan. In her final film of the year, Sen portrayed a surrogate mother in the romantic film Filhaal..., opposite Palash Sen. Radhika Rajamani of Idlebrain opined, "The sterling performance (best up to date) of Sushmita Sen endears." BBC noted, "Sushmita Sen, is the sparkling character of the film. She adds the lighter moments with sheer panache. In my books, she is a real gem!" Her performance in the film earned her a third nomination for the Filmfare Award for Best Supporting Actress.

Sen played a widowed cop in her only film of 2003, the acclaimed thriller film, Samay: When Time Strikes. Taran Adarsh of Bollywood Hungama noted, "Sushmita Sen, cast in a challenging role, does full justice to her part."

Sen had three films in 2004. She first appeared in Vaastu Shastra, as a doctor opposite J. D. Chakravarthi. Her career's biggest success came with the action masala film Main Hoon Na, in which she played the role of a chemistry teacher opposite Shah Rukh Khan. The film grossed a total of ₹ 330,000,000 and was the second highest-grossing film of that year. Taran Adarsh of Bollywood Hungama noted, "Sushmita Sen looks like a million bucks and her on-screen chemistry with SRK is fantastic. Her role doesn't really demand histrionics, but she carries it off stylishly." In her last film of the year, she appeared alongside Manisha Koirala in Paisa Vasool.

Sen received further success with her two films of 2005. She first portrayed a dutiful nurse in her third film with Salman Khan, the romantic comedy Maine Pyaar Kyun Kiya?. It emerged as the fifth-highest-grossing film of the year. Sukanya Verma of Rediff.com stated, "Sen as Naina looks hot, talks sense and acts super. Her intelligence doesn't interfere with the absurdity of her surroundings. It only makes it more convincing." Later the year, she portrayed a lawyer in Main Aisa Hi Hoon opposite Ajay Devgan. BBC said that Sen "shines" in her performances as innocent client and well-meaning lawyer.

=== Career fluctuations (2006–2011) ===
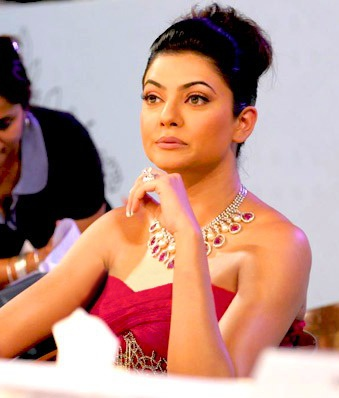
Sen at an event in 2009

Sen had two releases in 2006. She first played a prostitute with a child in Chingaari opposite Anuj Sawhney. Priyanka Jain of Rediff.com noted, "Sushmita puts in a mind-blowing performance. It's her film through and through. She is the only possible reason to watch this film." She then played a rockstar Kriya in the musical film Zindaggi Rocks, opposite Shiney Ahuja.

In 2007, she played a widow in the action drama film Ram Gopal Varma Ki Aag, opposite Prashant Raj Sachdev. It is considered as one of the worst films ever made. In 2009, Sen first appeared in the critical failure drama film Karma Aur Holi opposite Randeep Hooda. She then appeared opposite Govinda in the comedy film Do Knot Disturb.

Sen had two releases in 2010. She first appeared as a successful supermodel in the romantic comedy Dulha Mil Gaya, opposite Shah Rukh Khan and Fardeen Khan. The film was a moderate success that year. Sen then appeared in the action-comedy film No Problem, the same year.

=== Hiatus and expansion (2015–present) ===
Sen did not have any releases for five years. In 2015, she starred in a Bengali drama film titled Nirbaak, marking her comeback opposite Anjan Dutt. In Sen's career, this was her first film in Bengali language. Shomini Sen of News18 wrote, "Sushmita Sen is good but there is so much more that could be done to tap from her talent."

Post a hiatus of five years, Sen made her web debut in 2020 with Disney+ Hotstar's crime thriller Aarya. She played a mafia queen opposite Chandrachur Singh. Udita Jhunjhunwala of Firstpost noted, "Sen holds the series together. As the unsuspecting inheritor of a shady consignment, she literally and figuratively towers over everyone else. This meaty role allows her space to express herself." Sen received the award for Best Actress – Female, at the 2020 Filmfare OTT Awards. Sen then reprised her role in the second season of the series in 2022. Saibal Chatterjee of NDTV noted, "Sushmita Sen carries on from where she left off in Season 1. With nary a false step, she delivers another exceptional performance packed with power."

== Personal life ==
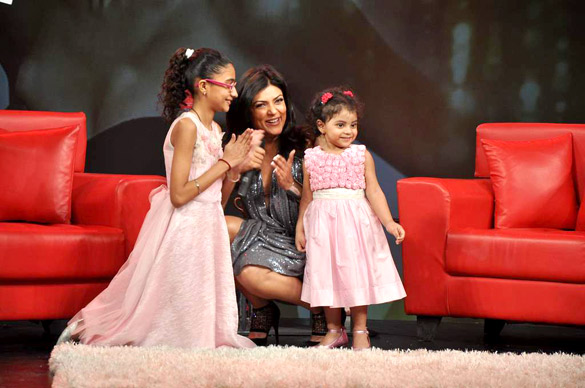
Sen with her daughters at Raveena Tandon's show Isi Ka Naam Zindagi

Sen is the mother of two adopted daughters. At the age of 24 years old, she adopted her first daughter Renee Sen in 2000 while her second daughter Alisah joined the family in 2010.

=== Health ===
Sen was diagnosed in 2014 with Addison's disease and was told she would require lifelong steroid drugs to manage the illness. After being rushed to hospital in 2019, doctors confirmed Sen no longer had to take steroids. "I healed in time, my adrenal glands woke up, no more steroids, no withdrawals and no auto-immune condition as of 2019," Sen stated.

=== Relationships ===
Sushmita Sen was in a relationship with actor Randeep Hooda from 2004 to 2006. Sen then dated model Rohman Shawl from 2018 to 2021. In July 2022, it was reported that she was dating businessman and cricket administrator Lalit Modi. In February 2025, Modi confirmed breakup with Sushmita Sen.

== In the media ==
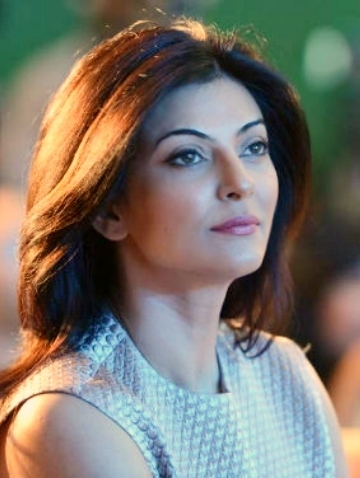
Sen in 2013

Sen is considered as one of the most popular actresses of 2000's in Hindi cinema. In Rediff.com's "Best Bollywood Actresses", Sen was placed 5th in 2004, 6th in 2005, 10th in 2006 and 3rd in 2020. Filmfare placed her 6th in their "Top Ten Actresses" list. Rediff.com further placed her 8th in its "Bollywood's Most Beautiful Actresses" list. In the Times Most Desirable Women list, Sen was placed 6th in 2009, 25th in 2010 and 27th in 2011. Cited in the media as a sex symbol, Sen was placed in Femina's "50 Most Beautiful Women" list. Times of India placed her at 11th position in its "50 Beautiful Faces" list. In 2020, she was named Rediff.com's "Top OTT Actresses".

== Awards and nominations ==
Year	Award	Category	Work	Result	Ref.
2000	Filmfare Awards	Best Supporting Actress	Biwi No.1	Won	
2000	IIFA Awards	Best Supporting Actress	Biwi No.1	Won	
2000	Screen Awards	Best Supporting Actress	Biwi No.1	Won	
2000	Zee Cine Awards	Best Actor in a Supporting Role - Female	Biwi No.1	Won	
2000	Filmfare Awards	Best Supporting Actress	Sirf Tum	Nominated	
2000	IIFA Awards	Best Supporting Actress	Sirf Tum	Nominated	
2000	People's Choice Awards India	Best Supporting Actress	Sirf Tum	Won	
2000	Screen Awards	Best Supporting Actress	Sirf Tum	Nominated	
2000	Zee Cine Awards	Best Actor in a Supporting Role - Female	Sirf Tum	Nominated	
2001	People's Choice Awards India	Best Supporting Actress	Bas Itna Sa Khwaab Hai	Nominated	
2003	Bollywood Movie Awards	Best Supporting Actress	Filhaal...	Nominated	
2003	Filmfare Awards	Best Supporting Actress	Filhaal...	Nominated	
2003	IIFA Awards	Best Supporting Actress	Filhaal...	Nominated	
2003	Sansui Viewers' Choice Movie Awards	Best Supporting Actress	Filhaal...	Nominated	
2003	Screen Awards	Best Supporting Actress	Filhaal...	Nominated	
2003	Zee Cine Awards	Best Actor in a Supporting Role - Female	Filhaal...	Won	
2004	Screen Awards	Best Actress	Samay: When Time Strikes	Nominated	
2005	Stardust Awards	Star of the Year – Female	Main Hoon Na	Nominated	
2005	Zee Cine Awards	Best Actor in a Supporting Role - Female	Main Hoon Na	Nominated	
2013	Mother Teresa Awards	Social Justice	—N/a	Won	
2016	India Leadership Conclave	Eternal Beauty & Actress of the Decade	—N/a	Won	
2018	I Am Woman Awards	Woman of Substance Award	—N/a	Won	
2020	Filmfare OTT Awards	Best Actor in a Drama Series - Female	Aarya	Won	
2021	Indian Television Academy Awards	Best Actress - OTT	Aarya	Nominated	
2021	Champions of Change Award	National Award For Social Welfare & Women Empowerment	—N/a	Won	
2022	Filmfare OTT Awards	Best Actor in a Drama Series - Female	Aarya 2	Nominated	
2022	Indian Television Academy Awards	Best Actress - OTT	Aarya 2	Nominated	
2024	Iconic Gold Awards	Best Actress of the Year - Popular Choice	Taali	Won	
2024	Filmfare OTT Awards	Best Actor in a Drama Series - Female	Taali	Nominated	

Awards and achievements
Preceded by (Puerto Rico) Dayanara Torres	Miss Universe; 1994	Succeeded by (United States) Chelsi Smith †
Preceded by Namrata Shirodkar	Femina Miss India; 1994	Succeeded by Manpreet Brar
