= Do Knot Disturb =

2009 Indian film by David Dhawan

- Theatrical release poster
- Directed by: David Dhawan
- Screenplay by: Yunus Sejawal, Amit Aaryan
- Based on: The Valet by Francis Veber
- Produced by: Vashu Bhagnani
- Starring: Govinda; Sushmita Sen; Lara Dutta; Ritesh Deshmukh; Sohail Khan; Rajpal Yadav
- Cinematography: Vijay Arora
- Edited by: Nitin Rokade
- Music by: Songs: Nadeem-Shravan; Background Score: Surinder Sodhi
- Production company: Pooja Entertainment
- Distributed by: BIG Pictures
- Release date: 2 October 2009
- Running time: 126 minutes
- Country: India
- Language: Hindi

Do Knot Disturb is a 2009 Indian comedy film directed by David Dhawan. The film is a remake of the 2006 French film The Valet (French: La Doublure). The film stars Govinda, Riteish Deshmukh, Lara Dutta, Sushmita Sen, Ranvir Shorey, Sohail Khan and Rajpal Yadav. It was released on 2 October 2009, and received generally positive reviews upon release. It was an inspiration for the 2014 Punjabi comedy Disco Singh which was also remade in Bengali as Haripada Bandwala.

Indiagames also released a mobile video game based on the film.

== Plot ==
The film is based on Raj who has a girlfriend, supermodel Dolly, and a wife, Kiran. Raj fires Mangu, a cook, because of attempting to seduce the female staff. To take revenge, Mangu takes a picture of Raj with Dolly and gives it to Kiran. Kiran gets suspicious but then Raj says that Dolly is not his girlfriend. He says that there are three people in the picture, Raj, Dolly and Govardhan. Raj tells Kiran that the guy, who came into the picture as he was walking by, is Dolly's boyfriend and tells Govardhan to live with Dolly for a couple of days so Kiran's suspicions will go away.

Govardhan gets really troubled when Dolly's ex-boyfriend Diesel shows up and threatens Govardhan that, when he finds out who Dolly's boyfriend is, Diesel will beat him up. Meanwhile, Kiran has a detective follow Dolly and Govardhan. The twist in the story comes when Kiran tells Raj that she is going to Pune to meet her mom, when she is actually making a plan with the detective to catch Dolly and Raj red-handed. As soon as Kiran leaves, Raj calls and books the presidential suite at a hotel for Dolly and him, just like Kiran expected. While Dolly and Raj are enjoying themselves, Kiran's detective starts his job. But he gets crushed by the window as he is trying to climb into Raj and Dolly's room. When Raj and Dolly notice, they call Govardhan to help get rid of the body because they think he is dead. Just as Govardhan shows up, so does Dolly's ex, Diesel. While trying to get rid of the body, Raj's ex-cook, Mangu, shows up (he is now working at the hotel).

The story takes a twist when they discover that the detective is alive. Lucky for them, he has lost his memory from the fall he suffered. Raj tells him he is John Matthews and he is married. Dolly tells him he is John Matthews and divorced. Govardhan tells him he is John Matthews, still a bachelor. Mangu tells him he is his friend and that he has a memory problem; under this pretense, he takes his watch and necklace saying that he forgot that Mangu actually gave it to him. Diesel runs into Govardhan and is about to beat him up when he tells him that Raj is her boyfriend. When Diesel runs into Raj, he tells him Govardhan is Dolly's boyfriend. Govardhan finds Dolly and tells her that instead of lying about love, she should be with the one who really loves her, Diesel. Dolly agrees and hugs Govardhan telling him he is a good guy. Unfortunately, Diesel mistakes the situation and starts to beat up Govardhan. Dolly saves Govardhan by telling Diesel that Govardhan convinced her to go back to him. Dolly leaves with Diesel.

Govardhan goes back to his sick mother in the hospital. (She is the one he did this all for. He needs money for her hospital bill and agreed to go along with everything Raj said.) He agrees to marry the woman of his mother's choice, Mala the nurse taking care of her. And Raj convinces Kiran that nothing is going on and they go home as well. In the midst of all this, the detective gets his memory back and goes to Kiran with the proof of her husband's infidelity. As he gets there, Kiran and Raj are about to leave for a second honeymoon. When the detective sees the love between Kiran and Raj, he loses hope and throws the camera with the proof of Raj and Dolly's affair. The camera lands on Kiran's foot, and she sees the pictures. The story ends with Raj crying.

== Cast ==
- Govinda as Rajiv "Raj" Saxena
- Ritesh Deshmukh as Govardhan / Pappu Plumber
- Lara Dutta as Dolly
- Sushmita Sen as Kiran Saxena
- Rajpal Yadav as Mangu
- Sohail Khan as Diesel Bhai
- Ranvir Shorey as John Matthews / Nunnu / Kiran's Detective
- Manoj Pahwa as Buntu
- Himani Shivpuri as Govardhan's Mom
- Rituparna Sengupta as Nurse Mala
- Ali Asgar as Bagga
- Satish Kaushik as Govardhan's Boss
- Sheela Sharma as Hotel Heritage's Hostess

== Songs ==
The music for the album has been composed by the music director duo Nadeem–Shravan, who made their comeback after their split in 2006. The lyrics were penned by Sameer.

1. "Zulfein Khol Khaal Me" – Sonu Nigam, Anuradha Sriram
2. "O Meri Bebo, O Aaja Bebo" – Neeraj Shridhar, Anushka Manchanda
3. "Do Not Disturb" – Anushka Manchanda
4. "Dont Ever Leave Me" – Shreya Ghoshal, Shaan
5. "Mere Naal Mere Naal Chal Soniye" – Shreya Ghoshal, K. K., Earl Dsouza
6. "She Is A Beautiful Woman" – Sowmya Raoh, Neeraj Shridhar

== Reception ==
The film received mixed reviews from critics. Taran Adarsh rated it 3.5/5 and described it as one of David Dhawan's best works yet. The film opened to a poor response and grossed $213,525. Overall, it earned a net gross of ₹ 65 million, and also faced competition from Wake Up Sid which surpassed Do Knot Disturb completely.
