= Viveck Vaswani =

India actor and producer (born 1962)

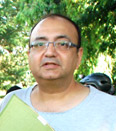
- Vaswani in 2012
- Born: Mumbai, India
- Years active: 1984–present
- Political party: Indian National Congress

Viveck Vaswani is an actor, writer and producer. He is also dean of Pearl Academy.

== Political career ==
He joined Indian National Congress in presence of Varsha Gaikwad on 1 October 2024.

== Career ==
An alumnus of Campion School and Cathedral and John Connon, started off with acting in India's first TV soap opera Khandaan. He then produced a Marathi film called Kis Bai Kiss, and a major television serial called Nai Dishayen, in which he also starred along with Navin Nischol, Anju Mahendru, Girish Karnad, Parikshit Sahni, Sharon Prabhakar, and Jayant Kripalani. He produced Gawaahi, giving a break to Anant Balani as a director. The film starred Zeenat Aman, Tanuja, Vikram Gokhale, and both India's Oscar nominated directors, Shekhar Kapur and Ashutosh Gowariker. He then produced three films at Sippy Films alongside GP Sippy, Patthar Ke Phool, Raju Ban Gaya Gentleman, Aatish: Feel the Fire and played minor roles in them as well. He has launched Raveena Tandon, Shah Rukh Khan, and given breaks to many (Sanjay Gupta and Sanjay Gadhvi were both assisting on Patthar Ke Phool).

He has acted in more than a 100 films.

When Shah Rukh Khan came to Mumbai as a hopeful actor, he had no place to stay. He lived with Vaswani, who later appeared in Raju Ban Gaya Gentleman and Josh with him, and helped SRK meet directors and producers. and launched him in Raju Ban Gaya Gentleman. They also acted together in English Babu Desi Mem, Dulha Mil Gaya, Kabhi Haan Kabhi Naa, King Uncle and Vaswani has been a continuous mentor to him.

Vaswani also produced Everybody Says I'm Fine! in the English language, giving a break to Rahul Bose, who made his debut as a director, actors Koel Purie, Rehaan Engineer, Anahita Uberoi, Boman Irani, and has the distinction of getting Carlos Santana to play lead guitar on the title track of the film, composed by Zakir Hussain.

== Films ==
Viveck Vaswani's first film as a producer was a Marathi film titled "Kis Bai Kiss" which was made in eleven lakhs. The film was directed by Murlidhar Kapdi in 1986. The film starred actors Laxmikant Berde, Ashwini Bhave, Avinash Kharshikar, Nivedita Joshi, Nayantara and Sudhir Joshi.

As an actor, he has played minor roles in various films, starting with Patthar Ke Phool in 1991. Vivek played a character named Lovechand Kukreja in the superhit film Raju Ban Gaya Gentleman (1992), starring Shahrukh Khan. The actor also appeared in hit films like Jab Pyaar Kisise Hota Hai, Soldier, Aa Ab Laut Chalen (1999), Tera Jadoo Chal Gayaa, Josh (2000), Maine Pyaar Kyun Kiya (2005), My Name Is Anthony Gonsalves (2008) and more. On Television, his famous series was Kabhi yeh Kabhi Voh, with Smita Jaykar, Jatin Kanakia and Dilip Joshi. He also acted in Zabaan Sambhalke, with Pankaj Kapoor. In 2004, he also mentored the contestants of the season 1 of the Zee TV television series India's Best Cinestars Ki Khoj along with Sudhir Mishra

== Filmography ==
=== As actor ===
- Raju Ban Gaya Gentleman (1992) as Lovechand
- Aashiq Awara (1993) as Rakesh Rajpal
- King Uncle (1993) as Kamal
- Jab Pyaar Kisise Hota Hai (1998) as Suraj Dhanwa
- Soldier (1998) as The College Principal
- Aa Ab Laut Chalen (1999) as Vaswani
- Josh (2000) as Savio
- Tera Jadoo Chal Gayaa (2000)
- Hum Kisise Kum Nahin (2002) as Doctor
- Ishq Vishk (2003) as Professor
- Fida (2004) as The Bank Employee
- Aashiq Banaya Aapne (2005) as Karan's Uncle
- Barsaat (2005) as Mr. Vaswani
- Insan (2005) as Agarwal
- 36 China Town (2006) as Mr. Dixit, Lawyer
- Shakalaka Boom Boom (2007) as Vidyacharan Shukla
- My Name is Anthony Gonsalves (2008)
- Dulha Mil Gaya (2010) as Lawyer
- Mastizaade (2016) – Producer

==== Television ====
- Khandaan (1985)
- Zabaan Sambhalke (1993)
- Bullets (2021)

=== As producer and writer ===
- Kis Bai Kis (1986) Marathi Film
- Nai Dishayen (TV)
- Gawaahi (1986) Feature
- Patthar Ke Phool (1991; co produced with Sippy Films)
- Raju Ban Gaya Gentleman (1992; co produced with Sippy Films)
- Everybody Says I'm Fine! (2001)
- Sar Aankhon Par (1999)
- Dil Vil Pyar Vyar (2002; co produced with Metalight)
- Dulha Mil Gaya (2010)
- Rough Book (2015; co produced with Aerika Cineworks)
