= Lorenzo Searches for the Meaning of Life =

2024 novel by Upamanyu Chatterjee

- Author: Upamanyu Chatterjee
- Language: English
- Genre: Literary fiction
- Set in: Italy and Bangladesh, 1977 onward
- Publisher: Speaking Tiger
- Publication date: 2024
- Publication place: India
- Media type: Print

Lorenzo Searches for the Meaning of Life is a 2024 novel by the Indian writer Upamanyu Chatterjee. Published by Speaking Tiger, it follows Lorenzo Senesi, an Italian man who becomes a Benedictine monk and serves at a mission in Bangladesh before leaving monastic life. The novel won the 2024 JCB Prize for Literature.

== Background ==
The novel is loosely biographical, drawing on the life of an Italian acquaintance whom Chatterjee met in Sri Lanka. Chatterjee, a former officer of the Indian Administrative Service, is best known for his first novel English, August (1988) and won the Sahitya Akademi Award in 2004 for The Mammaries of the Welfare State.

== Plot ==
In 1977, the teenaged Lorenzo, living in northern Italy, survives a serious road accident that prompts an existential crisis and a turn towards religion. After training as a physiotherapist and joining a parish prayer group, he enters the Benedictine monastery of Praglia Abbey, near Padua, where he takes permanent vows and remains for about a decade. He is then sent to a Benedictine mission in the Khulna district of Bangladesh, stopping first in England for several months of English-language study. In Bangladesh he prays seven times a day, learns Bengali, runs a physiotherapy clinic at Satkhira and paints a chapel, and he falls in love. He eventually asks the church to release him from his vows, marries Dipa, a Bangladeshi Catholic, and raises a family, later working as a civil servant. Reviewers noted that the narrative is non-linear, with Lorenzo passing through the stages of a life in close to reverse order.

== Reception ==
Reviewers paid particular attention to Chatterjee's humour and his treatment of monastic life. In The Tribune, the reviewer praised his handling of the Benedictine routine of ora et labora and of the cultural and linguistic settings of Padua and Trieste. Writing in The Federal, the reviewer described the idea of the journey, both physical and spiritual, as the book's central motif and noted its rejection of a linear path. A review in The Week highlighted Chatterjee's wry humour and his satirical view of the spiritual life.

== Awards ==
Lorenzo Searches for the Meaning of Life won the 2024 JCB Prize for Literature, announced on 23 November 2024, which carries a prize of ₹25 lakh. The jury member Jerry Pinto described the book as a "tour de force" that moved across the geographies of faith and reason.
