= Aadya Bedi =

Indian actress

- Occupation: Actress
- Years active: 1999–present

Aadya Bedi is an Indian theater artist and Bollywood actress. She has appeared in several Bollywood movies, played a role in the American police procedural television drama series Law & Order: Criminal Intent and has appeared in New York International Fringe Festival shows.

Aadya Bedi is the niece of famous actor Kabir Bedi.

== Career ==
Aadya Bedi made her debut in Dev Benegal's 1999 Indian film Split Wide Open. Her second movie came after a gap of eleven years. During her absence from Bollywood, Bedi was working in theater and in American television.

== Filmography ==
=== Films ===
Year	Title	Role	Notes	Source
1999	Split Wide Open	-	-	
2010	Grant St. Shaving Co	Radha	-	
2011	Koel	Damini	-	
2013	Fireflies	Maya	-	

=== Television ===
Year	Title	Role	Notes	Source
2008	Law & Order: Criminal Intent	Jasmina Khan	-	

== See also ==
- Cinema of India
- Bollywood
- Kabir Bedi
- Law & Order: Criminal Intent
- Fireflies
- Split Wide Open
