= Mehnaz Hoosein =

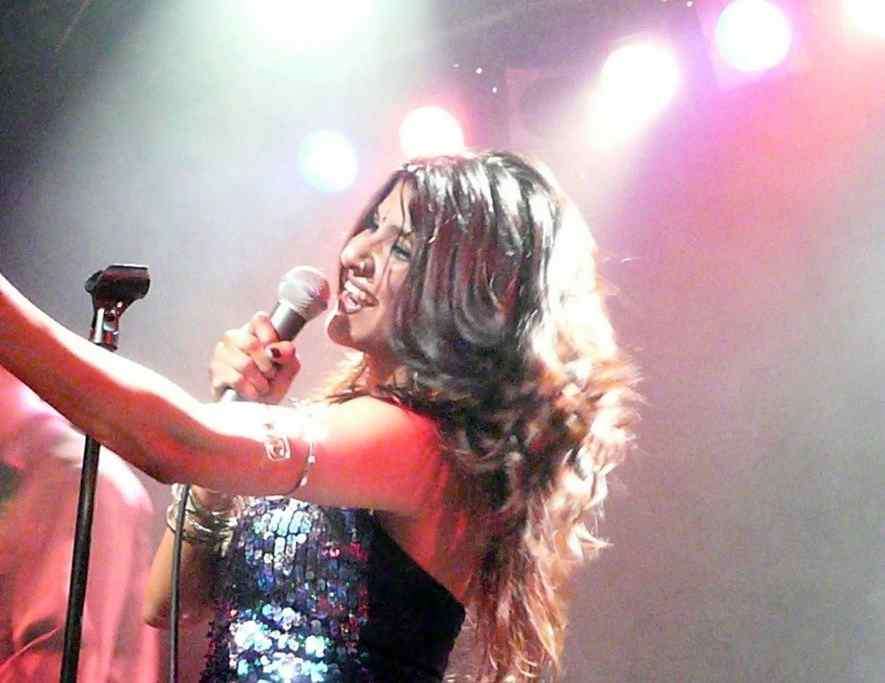
- Mehnaz at Neumos, Seattle, Washington (4 March 2011)

Background information
- Born: Mehnaz Hoosein; 30 January 1973 (age 53); Mumbai, India
- Origin: India
- Genres: Indipop; Progressive Rock; Worldbeat
- Occupation: Singer, song-writer
- Instrument: Vocals
- Years active: 1996–present
- Labels: BMG Music; Universal Music Group; Magnasound; Zee Music; Mowlawner Records
- Website: www.mehnazmusic.com

Mehnaz Hoosein (born 30 January 1973) is an Indian pop singer and songwriter from Mumbai, India, popularly known for her hit song 'Banoongi Main Miss India'. She is a graduate from St. Xavier's College, Mumbai. At the age of 13, Mehnaz started her vocal training in Hindustani classical music under the tutelage of Pandit Bhavdeep Jaipurwale. She began training as a dancer with Shiamak Davar from 1988 and performed with the Shiamak Davar Institute of Performing Arts till 1995. Mehnaz achieved success with her song Miss India which won her the 1996 Channel V Music Award for Best Female Pop Vocalist. At the time, Mehnaz was managed by Diana Hayden who was crowned Miss India the same year. It was in the nineties that Indi-pop began to emerge as an alternative to film music in India when a large number of pop singers emerged on the music scene.

== Early life and career ==
In 1996, Mehnaz won the Screen Videocon Award for Best Pop Singer for her debut album Miss India in the Non-Film Music category. Her song Main Hoon (composed by Merlin D'Souza) from the album Miss India was featured on the soundtrack of Deepa Mehta's movie Fire. In 1997 she was featured in a multi-artist video called Wajah Muskurane Ki (A Reason to Smile) to celebrate 50 years of Indian independence and the video aired on Indian television channels. Mehnaz recorded a duet titled Senada Cinta with BMG Malaysia's recording artist Iwan in 1998. In 1998, she sang the number Paisa paisa paisa for the soundtrack of the indie film Bombay Boys. In 1999, Mehnaz recorded a duet called You Are The Reason with Graham Russell and Russell Hitchcock of the band Air Supply for the soundtrack of Dev Benegal's award-winning film Split Wide Open. She released her second solo album titled Mausam with BMG Crescendo in 1999. In the year 2000, Mehnaz recorded the song Dreamcatcher for the soundtrack of the indie film Snip!, directed by Sunhil Sippy. She was also featured on the duet You Are The Reason on Yours Truly, the fifteenth album by Air Supply released in 2001. Mehnaz was a judge on Channel V's, Coke V Popstars 2 in 2003. In 2006, Mehnaz' released her third solo album Sajnaa with Universal Music India.

== Mehnaz and Manooghi Hi ==
In 2007, Mehnaz travelled to the United States and collaborated with local musicians who eventually formed the core of the Seattle-based band, Manooghi Hi. As lead singer of Manooghi Hi, Mehnaz brought her background and knowledge of Indian pop and Hindustani classical music to the all-American pure rock sensibilities of the band; Jonathan Zwickel of The Seattle Times said 'their sound has never before been attempted'. Mehnaz and Manooghi Hi vocalize in several South Asian languages, including English, Urdu, Sanskrit, Hindi and Bengali. Manooghi Hi released two albums titled Hi in 2009, and Silence in 2011. Mehnaz was featured on the 2012, the Barrett Martin album release Artifact on Sunyata Records.

In 2012, Mehnaz moved to New Orleans to pursue her dream of living in one of the most musical cities in the world. She has performed at Voodoo Fest with Leslie Blackshear Smith. Mehnaz has also performed with Master Sarode player Aashish Khan and (Shringar) Larry Sieberth, Andrew McLean, Michael Skinkus and Tim Green. Mehnaz has been collaborating with pianist, composer and producer Lawrence Sieberth and was featured at the New Orleans Jazz & Heritage Festival 2015.

== Discography ==
=== Studio albums ===
Title	Details
Miss India	Released: April 1996; Label: BMG Crescendo; Formats: CD, cassette, digital download
Mausam	Released: July 1999; Label: Magnasound, BMG Crescendo; Formats: CD, cassette
Sajnaa	Released: 2006; Label: Universal Music Group; Formats: CD, cassette
Hi (as part of Manooghi Hi)	Released: 2009; Label: Manooghi Hi Records; Formats: CD, Digital download
Silence (as part of Manooghi Hi)	Released: 2011; Label: Manooghi Hi Records; Formats: CD, Digital download

=== Soundtrack albums ===
- Bombay Boys (1998)
- Split Wide Open (1999)
- Snip (2000)

=== Compilation albums ===
- 32 Smash Hits (2000) BMG Crescendo Music
- Hitz Unlimited (2002) Zee Records

=== Featured on albums ===
- Air Supply (2001), Giant Records / Warner Bros.
- Clockwork (2011), Slow Bunny Records.
- Artifact (2012), Barrett Martin Group, Sunyata Records.

=== Other albums ===
- A Reason To Smile (1997) Magnasound

== Awards and nominations ==
Year	Category	Song	Result
Channel V Music Awards
1996	Best Female Pop Singer	"Main Hoon" from Miss India	Won
Screen Awards
1997	Best Pop Singer	"Main Hoon" from Miss India	Won
