= Weight loss (disambiguation) =

Weight loss is a reduction of the total body mass in an individual.

Weight loss may also refer to:

- "Weight Loss" (The Office), an episode of the American TV show The Office
- Weight Loss (novel), a novel by Upamanyu Chatterjee
