= Jazbaat =

Jazbaat (lit. 'Feelings') may refer to:

- Jazbaat (1980 film), a 1980 Indian Hindi-language film directed and written by Suraj Prakash
- Jazbaat (1994 film), a 1994 Indian Hindi-language film directed by Anant Balani

== See also ==
- Jazbaa, 2015 Indian film directed by Sanjay Gupta
- Jazba (Punjabi TV Series), an Indian Punjabi-language TV series
