= Rahul Bose =

Indian film actor and politician (born 27 July 1967)

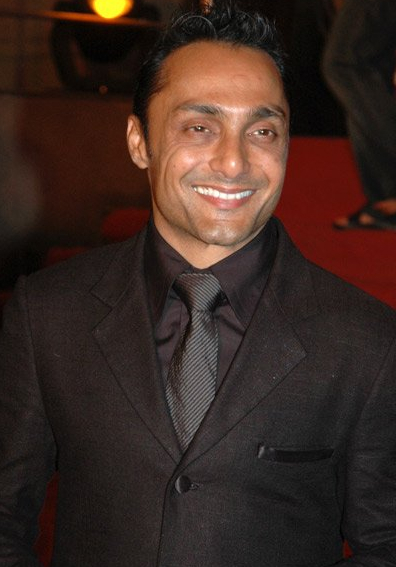
- Bose in 2008
- Born: 27 July 1967 (age 59); Calcutta, West Bengal, India
- Occupations: Actor; Director; Screenwriter; Social activist; President (Rugby India)
- Years active: 1993–present
- Relatives: S. P. P. Thorat (grandfather)

President of Rugby India
- Incumbent
- Assumed office 18 December 2021
- Preceded by: Vikram Ahuja

Rahul Bose (born 27 July 1967) is an Indian actor, sports administrator and former rugby player who works in Hindi films. Bose serves as the president of Rugby India since 2021.

He has appeared in Bengali films such as Mr. and Mrs. Iyer, Kalpurush, Anuranan, Antaheen, Laptop and The Japanese Wife. He has also appeared in Hindi films such as Pyaar Ke Side Effects, Maan Gaye Mughal-e-Azam, Jhankaar Beats, Kucch Luv Jaisaa, Dil Dhadakne Do, Chameli and Shaurya. He also played the antagonist in the Tamil thriller Vishwaroopam (2013) and its sequel.

In the early 2000s, Time magazine named him "the superstar of Indian arthouse cinema" while Maxim named him "the Sean Penn of Oriental cinema" for his work in parallel cinema films like English, August and Mr. and Mrs. Iyer.

He is also notable for his social activism: he participated in the relief efforts that followed the 2004 Boxing Day tsunami and is also the founder of the anti-discrimination NGO, The Foundation.

== Early life and education ==
Rahul Bose was born to father Rupen and mother Kumud Bose on 27 July 1967. His father is Bengali while his mother is part Punjabi and part Marathi. His maternal grandfather was Lieutenant-General S. P. P. Thorat.

Bose's first acting role was at the age of six when he played the lead character in a school play, Tom, the Piper's Son. As a child he took an interest in sports after his mother introduced him to boxing and rugby union. He also played cricket and was coached by former India cricket captain Mansoor Ali Khan Pataudi.

He is an alumnus of the Cathedral and John Connon School in Mumbai. After being rejected by a number of American universities, Bose attended Sydenham College. While at the college he played on the school's rugby team and competed in the Western India Championships, winning a silver medal in boxing. After his mother's death in 1987, Bose began working as a copywriter at Rediffusion and was later promoted to advertising creative director. Bose left the job to become a full-time actor after the release of his first film, English, August.

== Stage and film career ==
=== Early career: 1993–2003 ===
Bose started his acting career on the Mumbai stage in Rahul D'Cunha's Topsy Turvey and Are There Tigers in the Congo?. D'Cunha's aunt was the casting director for director Dev Benegal's film English, August and suggested that Bose should play the lead role. After filming a screen test, Benegal decided to cast him as civil servant Agastya Sen. Based on the novel of the same name by Upamanyu Chatterjee, English, August was one of the first Hinglish films and gained Bose international recognition when it became the first Indian film to be purchased by 20th Century Fox and won several awards at international film festivals.

After English, August Bose found work in television; he was offered a role in India's first English-language television serial, A Mouthful of Sky and also co-hosted BBC World's Style! with Laila Rouass. In 1998 he appeared in Kaizad Gustad's Bombay Boys with Naseeruddin Shah and starred in Dev Benegal's second film, Split Wide Open. To prepare for his role as a roving water vendor, Bose lived in Mumbai's slums and observed a drug dealer for two weeks. He later cited this time—along with the 2002 Gujarat riots—as the beginning of the awakening of his social conscience. Although Split Wide Open was controversial in India because of its depictions of sexual abuse, Bose received the Silver Screen Award for Best Asian Actor at the 2000 Singapore International Film Festival for his performance. He also performed abroad in the Leicester Haymarket in England where he starred in the English version of Tim Murari's play, The Square Circle.

In 1997, Bose was cast to play the role of Saleem Sinai in the BBC adaptation of Salman Rushdie's novel Midnight's Children. The project was eventually canceled after the Indian and Sri Lankan governments refused to allow filming. After seeing Bose in English, August, director Govind Nihalani cast him in the villain role opposite Ajay Devgan in the mainstream film Thakshak. The film was not a financial success, although Bose received positive reviews.

Bose also appeared as "Vikal" a villain in the 1998 Science fiction TV series Captain Vyom

In 2001, Bose made his directorial debut with Everybody Says I'm Fine!. Starring Rehaan Engineer and Koel Purie and featuring Bose in a supporting role, Everybody received mixed reviews from critics, but won Bose the runner-up John Schlesinger Award for best directorial debut at the 2003 Palm Springs International Film Festival. In 2002, Bose starred opposite Konkona Sen Sharma in Aparna Sen's art film Mr. and Mrs. Iyer. The film, a critique of communal violence, was a critical success and won several awards at international film festivals as well as three National Film Awards.

=== Mainstream work: 2003–present ===
In 2003, Bose entered mainstream Bollywood cinema with Jhankaar Beats in which he played one of two friends, R.D. Burman fans who are obsessed with winning a music competition. Boosted by a successful soundtrack, Jhankaar Beats was a surprise hit in urban multiplexes and went on to win several awards for its music. The same year, Bose appeared in another Bollywood film, Mumbai Matinee which saw a UK release. He starred in Chameli opposite Kareena Kapoor, playing a wealthy chain-smoking Mumbai banker who is stranded in the monsoon rains with a prostitute. The film was not a box office success, but won several Filmfare and IIFA awards.

He was the screenwriter of Hero Bhakti Hi Shakti Hai of Hungama TV in 2005.

Bose's second film pairing with Konkona Sen Sharma, 15 Park Avenue released in January 2006. Directed by Aparna Sen and filmed in English, 15 Park Avenue won the 2006 National Film Award for Best Feature Film in English.

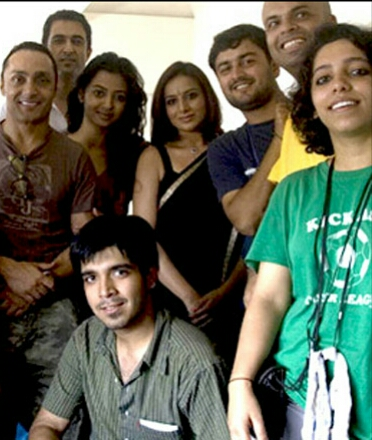
Bose (far left) on the set of National Award-winning Hindi film I Am in 2010

With his next effort, the romantic comedy Pyaar Ke Side Effects, Bose moved once more into mainstream Bollywood cinema. The film follows the rocky relationship of Bose's commitment phobic Mumbai DJ Sid and his Punjabi girlfriend, Trisha played by Mallika Sherawat. Critics noted the freshness of Bose's narration style which involves breaking the fourth wall, a device not commonly used in Indian cinema. The film opened well in multiplexes and was a moderate financial success, eventually ranking among the top-grossing films of 2006. Both Bose and Sherawat received positive reviews for their performances. Sherawat and Bose also starred together in another Bollywood comedy, Maan Gaye Mughal-e-Azam (2008), which was a commercial and critical failure.

In 2006, Bose starred in the first of a trio of Bengali films, Aniruddha Roy Chowdhury's Anuranan. Anuranan was well received on the festival circuit and ran successfully for three months in Bengal. It was then dubbed into Hindi and released nationally. Kaalpurush, Bose's second Bengali film, was released commercially in April 2008. Kaalpurush details a father-son relationship and earned writer-director Buddhadeb Dasgupta a National Film Award for Best Feature Film. Bose teamed with Chowdhury again in 2009 for Antaheen which tells the story of online relationships. Like Anuranan, Antaheen was released commercially in West Bengal and was screened at various film festivals, including the Mahindra Indo-American Arts Council Film Festival (MIACC) and the International Film Festival of India (IFFI). Antaheen went on to win several National Awards including one for Best Film.

Bose continued working in a mix of mainstream and arthouse films in 2008, with the English-language film, Before the Rains. Before the Rains was released in the US and the UK and Bose's performance was praised by many critics, although the film received mixed reviews. Bose also appeared in Shaurya, a military court room drama modelled on the American film A Few Good Men. Bose's performance was well-received; critic Taran Adarsh said his "performance easily ranks as one of his finest works". His appearance in Dil Kabaddi paired him with Konkona Sen Sharma for the third time, this time playing a husband and wife undergoing marital difficulties. The Japanese Wife, with Japanese actress Chigusa Takaku, the third Aparna Sen film in which he has appeared, released on 9 April 2010. He also appeared as a contestant in the reality show Khatron Ke Khiladi where he was eliminated in the 12th round. He hosted the second series of Bloomberg UTV reality show The Pitch. His role as a gay man harassed by the police in I Am was appreciated by critics.

He appeared in Deepa Mehta's version of Midnight's Children where he played the role of General Zulfikar. He also played the villain in the 2013 Tamil film Vishwaroopam. Naren Weiss who was 19 years old at the time, acted opposite Bose in all of his scenes for Vishwaroopam, and credited Bose for working with him during filming. He was scheduled to begin shooting his adaptation of Mohsin Hamid's novel, Moth Smoke in early 2010, but the project was postponed after the film's financial backers pulled out. In 2013, he also played opposite Konkona Sen Sharma again in Suman Mukhopadhyay's Shesher Kabita. In 2017, he directed, produced and acted in the biopic Poorna about the youngest girl to climb Mount Everest.

== Filmography ==
Year	Film	Role	Language	Notes
1993	Ramayana the Legend of Prince Rama	Bharata (voice)	Hindi	Voiceover
1994	English, August	Agastya Sen	English	
1995	A Mouthful of Sky	Sarkar / Pavan	English	Television series
1996	Bomgay	The Lefty	English	
1998	Bombay Boys	Ricardo Fernandes	English	
1999	Split Wide Open	Kut Price	English	
1999	Thakshak	Sunny	Hindi	
2001	Everybody Says I'm Fine!	Rage	English	
2002	Mr. and Mrs. Iyer	Jahangir Chaudhary (Raja)	English	
2003	Jhankaar Beats	Rishi	Hindi / English	
2003	Ek Din 24 Ghante	Virendra	Hindi	
2003	Mumbai Matinee	Debashish "Debu" Chatterjee	Hindi / English	
2003	Chameli	Aman Kapoor	Hindi	
2004	White Noise	Karan Deol	English	
2005	The Fall		English	Short film
2005	Scrum in the Mud with Rahul Bose	Himself	English	Documentary
2005	Silsiilay	Neel Kashyap	Hindi	
2005	15 Park Avenue	Joydeep "Jojo" Roy	English	
2005	Ctrl+Alt+Del	Kabir	English	
2006	Anuranan	Rahul Chatterjee	Bengali	
2006	Pyaar Ke Side Effects	Siddharth "Sid" Bose	Hindi	
2006	The Other Side of Bollywood	Himself	English	Documentary
2007	Chain Kulii Ki Main Kulii	Varun Roy	Hindi	
2008	Before the Rains	T. K. Neelan	English / Malayalam	Bilingual film
2008	Shaurya	Major Siddhant Chaudhary (Sid)	Hindi	
2008	Maan Gaye Mughal-e-Azam	Arjun Rastogi	Hindi	
2008	Dil Kabaddi	Rishi Sharma	Hindi	
2008	Tahaan	Zafar	Hindi	
2008	Kaalpurush	Son	Hindi	
2009	Antaheen	Abhik Choudhury	Bengali	
2010	Fired	Joy Mittal	Hindi	
2010	The Japanese Wife	Snehamoy Chatterjee	English / Bengali / Japanese	
2011	Kuch Love Jaisa	Raghav Passport	Hindi	
2011	I Am	Jay Gowda	Hindi	
2012	Midnight's Children	Zulfikar	English	
2012	Laptop	Indro	Bengali	
2013	Vishwaroopam	Omar Qureshi	Tamil / Hindi	Bilingual film
2013	Shesher Kabita	Amit Ray	Bengali	
2014	Shondhey Namar Agey	Alok	Bengali	
2015	Dil Dhadakne Do	Manav Sangha	Hindi	
2015	Under Construction	Imtiaz	Bengali	Bangladeshi film
2016	Niruttara	Pradeep	Kannada	
2017	Poorna: Courage Has No Limit	Dr. R.S. Praveen Kumar	Hindi	Also director and producer
2018	Vishwaroopam II	Omar Qureshi	Tamil / Hindi	Bilingual
2020	Bulbbul	Mahendra/Indranil	Hindi	
2022	Salaam Venky	Lawyer Parvez Alam	Hindi	
2023	Binodini: Ekti Natir Upakhyan	Rangababu	Bengali	
2023	Neeyat	Jimmy Mistry	Hindi	
2023	Iraivan	"Smiley Killer" Brahma	Tamil	
2024	Berlin	Sondhi	Hindi	
2024	Amaran	Colonel Amit Singh Dabas	Tamil	
2024	Bhairathi Ranagal	Parande	Kannada	
2025	Binodiini: Ekti Natir Upakhyan		Bengali	
2025	Madam Sengupta	Ranjan Banerjee	Bengali	
2026	Udta Teer	M.D. Burman	Hindi	

=== Playback singing ===
Year	Film	Title
2006	Anuranan	"Akashe Chhorano Megher"

=== As writer and director ===
Year	Film
2001	Everybody Says I'm Fine!
2009	The Whisperers
2017	Poorna: Courage Has No Limit

=== As produced ===
Year	Film
2017	Poorna: Courage Has No Limit

=== Television ===
Year	Title	Role	Language
2009-2010	Baazi Dimaag Ki	Host	Hindi
2019	Teacher's Genuine Stories	Host	Hindi
2021	Bombay Begums	Mahesh Rao	Hindi
2021	Rabindranath Ekhane Kokhono Khete Asen Ni	Nirupam Chanda	Bengali
2022	Eternally Confused and Eager for Love	Ray's Father	English
2023	Taj: Divided by Blood	Mirza Hakim	Hindi

=== Stage ===
Year	Title	Role
1989	Topsy Turvey	
1993	Are There Tigers in the Congo?	
1996	Art	Mark
1999	The Square Circle	Lakshmi/Lakshman
1999	Seascape with Sharks and Dancer	

== Awards ==
- 2007 – "Artiste for Change" Karmaveer Puraskaar award
- 2008 – IBN Eminent Citizen Journalist Award
- 2009 – Youth Icon Award for Social Justice and Welfare
- 2010 – Green Globe Foundation Award for Extraordinary Work by a Public Figure
- 2012 – Hakim Khan Sur Award for National Integration – Maharana of Mewar Charitable Foundation
- 2012 – Lt. Governor's Commendation Award for services to Andaman & Nicobar Islands
- 2020 – Filmfare OTT Awards for Best Supporting Actor in a Web Original Film for Bulbbul

== Sports career ==
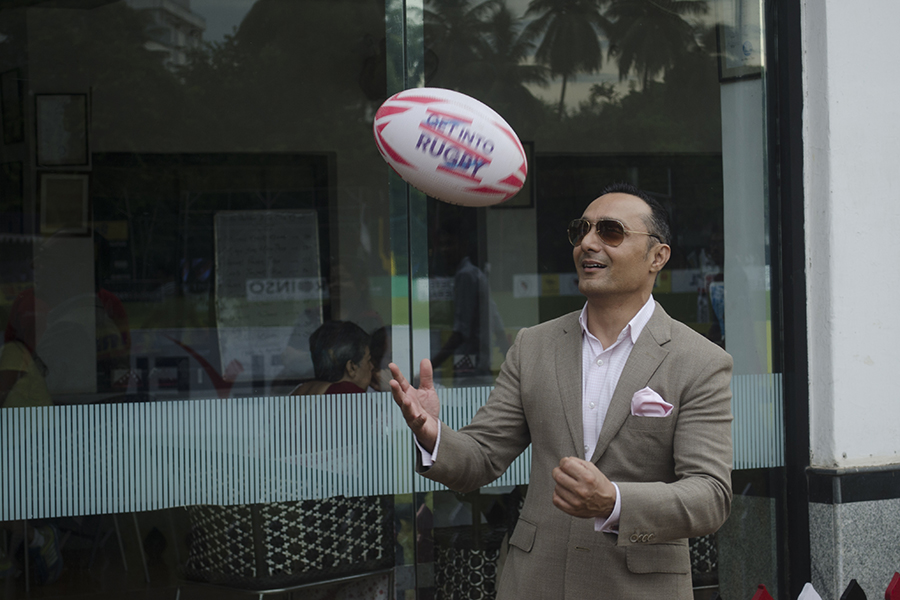
Rahul Bose juggles a rugby ball at the All India & South Asia Rugby Tournament

In 1998, Bose was part of the first Indian national rugby team to play in an international event, the Asian Rugby Football Union Championship. He has played both scrum-half and right-winger positions. In an interview with Daily News & Analysis, Bose announced that he would not return to the team for the 2009 season.

== Activism ==
Bose assisted in the relief efforts in the Andaman and Nicobar Islands after the 2004 tsunami. As a result of this work, Bose launched the Andaman and Nicobar Scholarship Initiative through his NGO, The Foundation. The scholarship program provides for the education of underprivileged children from the Andaman and Nicobar Islands.

Bose is associated with several charitable organizations such as Teach for India, Akshara Centre, Breakthrough, Citizens for Justice and Peace and the Spastics Society of India. He is closely associated with the Teach For India movement to eradicate inequity in education. In addition, he became the first Indian Oxfam global ambassador in 2007. He is the founder and chairman of The Group of Groups, an umbrella organisation for 51 Mumbai charitable organisations and NGOs. He is also an ambassador for the American India Foundation, the World Youth Peace Movement and Planet Alert. He was also a vocal proponent of Narmada Bachao Andolan and its efforts to halt the construction of the Narmada dam. He also recorded the Terre des hommes audio book Goodgoodi karna, gale lagana; Sparsh ke niyam sikhiye (English: Tickle and hugs: Learning the touching rules), which is designed to give children resources against sexual abuse.

Bose has given lectures on gender equality and human rights at Oxford and during the 2004 World Youth Peace Summit. In 2009, he toured Canada lecturing on global climate change under the auspices of Climate Action Network and demonstrated with protesters at the Copenhagen Climate Change Summit. In 2011, he worked in conjunction with Bhaichung Bhutia to raise funds for victims of the Sikkim earthquake.

At the 8th convocation of BRAC University Bangladesh on 17 February 2013, Bose delivered the convocation speech.

== Personal life ==
Bose has one elder sister, Anuradha, who is married to Tariq Ansari, the owner and director of Mid-Day Multimedia. She had a cameo role in Everybody Says I'm Fine! (2001). Bose is single. On his relationships, Rahul said, "I've had five very long relationships in my life, the last one finished seven years ago. I've had a life full of romantic love. Would I like another relationship, or five, or ten? Of course, I mean The Beatles said it best, 'all you need is love.' I would love to be in love, it would be fantastic."
