= The Last Burden =

1993 novel by Upamanyu Chatterjee

- First edition
- Author: Upamanyu Chatterjee
- Language: English
- Publisher: Faber & Faber
- Publication date: 16 August 1993
- Publication place: India
- Pages: 352 pp
- ISBN: 0-571-16825-6
- OCLC: 43607106
- Followed by: The Mammaries of the Welfare State

The Last Burden is a novel by Upamanyu Chatterjee that portrays life in an Indian middle-class family.

In this novel, he travels the lives of different people constituting a joint family, expertly portraying their emotions, needs and desires. This is a portrayal of the financial, social and emotional problems that make people favor an atomic family in contrast to a joint family as was the predominant practise in India.

The author uses somewhat strong language but makes the readers aware of the actual tensions that exist within the joint family structure. It elegantly portrays the decisions and sacrifices made by different people in a family and the frictions and frustrations thereby. It also portrays the struggle of the newer generation in order to move into an atomic family structure from a strictly hierarchical joint family structure while struggling to make amends with the darkness of their soul.

The novel talks about Jamun, a workless young man, his old father, Shyamanand, his dying mother, Urmila, and other members of his family. The novel opens at the deathbed of Urmila and takes you through the story of this middle-class family.

== Critical reception ==
Anjum Hasan reviews the novel in The Caravan.
