= Baazi Dimaag Ki =

Indian Hindi-language television game show

- Genre: Game show
- Presented by: Rahul Bose
- Country of origin: India
- Original language: Hindi
- No. of seasons: 1

Production
- Production location: India

Original release
- Network: StarPlus
- Release: 2009 – 2010

Baazi Dimaag ki was an Indian Hindi-language television game show that was broadcast on Indian television channel Star Plus. The show was hosted by Bollywood actor Rahul Bose. Baazi Dimaag ran over a year and the first episode of the show was telecast in 2009.

== Show format ==
The show was supported by Kellogg's corn flakes. In each episode, three families from different parts of India were invited as participants who would face off against each other. Each family would consist of the father, mother, and a kid with the age between 12 and 45 years. The show featured four rounds and the first round was played among the mothers of each family and was named Bojho toh jaane. The second round of the show was for the fathers of each family and is titled Dimaag Chalao. In this round, the fathers were asked to solve various puzzles including Jigsaw or Sudoku.
