= Chabiwali Pocket Watch =

- Movie poster
- Directed by: Vibhu Puri
- Written by: Vibhu Puri
- Produced by: Film and Television Institute of India
- Starring: Lalit Mohan Tiwari; Jameel Khan; Gayatri Kachru
- Cinematography: Anay Goswamy
- Edited by: Arindam Ghatak
- Music by: Mangesh Dhakde
- Release date: 2006
- Running time: 28 minutes
- Country: India
- Languages: Hindi; Urdu

Chabiwali Pocket Watch is a 2006 student short film written and directed by Vibhu Puri and produced by the Film and Television Institute of India. The film is set in Old Delhi and deals with the story of a romantic Urdu poet, now dying anonymously, and the struggle between his daughter and an opportunist publisher. The film was the official entry from India to the Student Academy Awards. It was also a chosen to be a part of Indian Panorama in 2006.

At the 53rd National Film Awards, director Vibhu Puri received the Special Jury Award. In 2013, it was amongst many FTII student films to be telecasted by the state-run Doordarshan channel.

== Synopsis ==
Urdu, the Hindustani language whose words resonate music, is fast dying. So is Babba, an old Urdu poet who is dying an unknown death. Having shut his eyes to the callous world that weighs art with money, he has woven a charming little world of his own. Babba's state of nonchalant bliss inadvertently drives his daughter Minni into a world of bitter silences. And across the road lives Pappan, a small-time debt-ridden publisher who is eyeing Babba's treasured verses and his beautiful daughter. A self-indulgent, romantic old man, a stoic but essentially soft-hearted daughter and an opportunist but naive publisher. Amidst all this, Babba, Minni and Pappan struggle to keep their culture alive, their ethos alive, their language alive, their love alive, in vain.

== Cast ==
- Lalit Mohan Tiwari as Babba
- Jameel Khan as Pappan
- Gayatri Kachru as Minni

== Festivals ==
- Cannes Film Festival
- Sydney international Film Festival
- International Film Festival of India, Goa
- Pune International Film Festival
- International Film School Festival, Poland
- IAAC Film Festival, NY
- KARA, Karachi
- JIFF, Jamshedpur
- Pulotsav, Pune
- SIFF, Seoul
- MIFF, Mumbai, ‘08
- Cork Film fest, ‘08

== Awards ==
- Best Feature at IBDA’A Awards, Dubai
- Special Kodak Award for the director at the 13th International Film School Festival, Poland
- Special Jury Award for the director Vibhu Puri, 53rd National Film Awards, 2006
- Winner, Asia Pacific Kodak Filmschool Competition, 2006
- Best Cinematography award in the 'Emerging Filmmakers' section, Cannes Film Festival: Anay Goswamy
