= Gustaakh Ishq =

2025 film by Vibhu Virender Puri

- Theatrical release poster
- Directed by: Vibhu Puri
- Written by: Vibhu Puri; Prasshant Jha
- Produced by: Manish Malhotra; Dinesh Malhotra
- Starring: Naseeruddin Shah; Vijay Varma; Fatima Sana Shaikh; Sharib Hashmi
- Cinematography: Manush Nandan
- Edited by: Nitin Baid; Divyashree Samantaray
- Music by: Songs: Vishal Bhardwaj; Background Score: Hitesh Sonik
- Production company: Stage5 Productions
- Distributed by: PVR Inox Pictures
- Release dates: 24 November 2025 (Goa); 28 November 2025
- Running time: 128 minutes
- Country: India
- Language: Hindi
- Box office: est. ₹2.29 crore

Gustaakh Ishq: Kuch Pehle Jaisa (transl. Audacious Love: Something Like Before) is a 2025 Indian Hindi-language romantic drama film directed by Vibhu Puri and produced by Stage5 Productions. The film stars Naseeruddin Shah, Vijay Varma, Fatima Sana Shaikh, and Sharib Hashmi. The film marks the debut of fashion designer Manish Malhotra as a film producer. The film is set in the 1990s and follows a young poet's efforts to revive his father's printing press, but in doing so falls for his mentor's daughter, forcing him to choose between love and loyalty.

The film was earlier titled Ul Jalool Ishq but the title was changed to Gustaakh Ishq: Kuch Pehle Jaisa, which was announced on 16 April 2025 with a poster. The film premiered at the Gala Premiere section at the 56th International Film Festival of India (IFFI) in Goa on 24 November 2025 and was released theatrically on 28 November 2025.

== Premise ==
In 1998, Nawabuddin Saifuddin Rahman/Pappan, who lives in Darya Ganj, Old Delhi in poverty with his mother and younger brother Jumman, is in pursuit to save his dead father's prized printing press. So he travels to Malerkotla, Punjab to meet a retired Urdu poet Aziz Baig, who is hiding his identity; as a watch-repair shop owner; on advise of Farukh, a low-grade Urdu poet. He wants to print his Urdu poetry books and in turn save his father's printing press, which he flatly refuses. He meets his daughter Mannat/Minni, a school teacher who has separated from her husband. Minni tells him her father does not want to write poetry anymore. He does not relent and becomes a disciple of Aziz Baig, in an effort to learn, write, and speak top-class Urdu. But as time passes, he falls in love with his daughter Minni. Jumman summons him to Delhi, where he tells him that they must sell the printing press. Pappan learns that Aziz was a long-time friend of his father, who had yearned for years to get Aziz's poetry printed, but died with his dream unfulfilled. He also learns a few truths, then he tries one last time to get Aziz to print his poetry. Even as he is torn between his love and honoring his mentor, he must make a decision that is right for all.

== Cast ==
- Naseeruddin Shah as Aziz Baig / "Babba"
- Zain Khan Durrani as Young Aziz Baig
- Vijay Varma as Nawabuddin Saifuddin Rehman Rizvi / "Pappan"
- Fatima Sana Shaikh as Mannat Ali Baig / "Minni"
- Sharib Hashmi as Bhoore
- Rohan Verma as Jumman
- Natasha Rastogi as Pappan and Jumman's mother
- Lilliput as Faruqui
- Jaya Bhattacharya as Khadeeja
- Faisal Rashid as Saifuddin (special appearance)
- Shashi Bhushan as Barrister Suryakant Ramakant Brahmakant Mishra

== Production ==
The film marks the debut of fashion designer Manish Malhotra as a film producer. He had launched Stage 5 Production in September 2023 with his brother Dinesh Malhotra with Rachita Bisht as executive producer. Manish Malhotra has also designed the costume for the film along with Shivank Kapoor. The film is the 3rd production of Manish Malhotra as producer.

=== Development and casting ===
The film which was earlier titled "Ul-Jalool Ishq" was announced on social media by the producer Manish Malhotra on 24 August 2025. The film has music by Vishal Bharadwaj and lyrics by poet and lyricist Gulzar. In the film Naseeruddin Shah will be orating poetry written by poet Ashok Singh Mizaz. This is the first feature film of Vijay Varma in five years to release on the big screen.

=== Filming ===
The film was shot in and around the city of Amritsar and Delhi. The film was announced on 2 January 2024 and the shooting commenced from 9 January 2024. The film was at that time titled Ul Jalool Ishq. The film was shot in a start-to-finish schedule that ended on 17 March 2025. Some scenes of the film were also shot in Delhi in April 2024. During the making of the film, Fatima had suffered an episode of epileptic seizure.

=== Post-production ===
The film is complete and is in post-production. Resul Pookutty and Hitesh Sonik are also involved in post production.

== Marketing ==
The first poster was released on 6 November 2025.

=== Promotion ===
The lead pair of Vijay Varma and Fatima Sana Shaikh attended a promotion campaign at Film Division Auditorium in New Delhi where the film trailer was also launched. The lead pair also promoted the film on Sahitya Aajtak on 23 November 2025.

== Soundtrack ==
The film's soundtrack is composed by Vishal Bharadwaj, with lyrics written by Gulzar. The first single "Ul Jalool Ishq", was released on 16 September 2025. The second single "Aap Iss Dhoop Mein" was released on 7 October 2025. The third single 'Sheher Tere', a duet was released on 29 October 2025. The soundtrack album was released under Zee Music Company.

== Release ==
The film is scheduled for theatrical release in India on 28 November 2025. The film was earlier slated to release on 21 November 2025 but was postponed to avoid a clash with 120 Bahadur but will clash with another romantic drama film Tere Ishk Mein. The film premiered on 24 November 2025, at the 56th edition of IFFI in Goa on 24 November 2025 at the Gala Premiere Section. CBFC has given clearance to the film, giving a U/A certificate for 13 +, meaning the film is suitable for above 13. There were no visual cuts but only a few words were replaced.

=== Home video ===
The film began streaming on JioHotstar on 27 January 2026.

== Reception ==
=== Box office ===
The film collected ₹2.29 crore worldwide.

=== Reviews ===
Syed Firdaus Ashraf of Rediff.com gave 4 stars out of 5 and said that "Gustaakh Ishq feels like a cinematic revival of everything we once loved about Urdu story-telling."

Rahul Desai of The Hollywood Reporter India observed that "Vibhu Puri's metrical film pays ode to Sanjay Leela Bhansali, but also becomes its own treaty on the preservation of love and language.

Nandini Ramnath of Scroll.in stated that "Gustaakh Ishq (Audacious Love) has the quality of a novella that could have rolled off Babban's press. Gentle jibes and playful put-downs flow between Babban and Aziz, with Minnie too piping up every now and then. Aziz's observations on how Urdu is to be spoken – and not spoken – is a minor lesson in the language."

Ashish Tiwari of Dainik Bhaskar stated, "The story captures the fragrance of Old Delhi, elegance of Urdu, and warmth of human relationships. Director Vibhu Puri has crafted Gustakh Ishk like a soft, warm poem. The film has outstanding cinematography, meticulous set design creating an era that transports you back in time. Vijay Varma, Fatima Sana Shaikh, Naseeruddin Shah and Sharib Hashmi have delivered stellar performances. Hitesh Sonik's background score makes the film heart-touching. Music by Vishal Bhardwaj and lyrics by Gulzar add soul to the film. Overall, Gustaakh Ishq is a film made from the heart. It's nostalgic yet refreshing. Slow-paced but seeps into soul. Film showcases simplicity in stories and innocence in love."

Smita Srivastav of Dainik Jagran gave 3 out of 5 stars saying, "The film is slow in the start. The film delves deep in the beauty of Urdu poetry. Cinematography covering locations of Delhi and Punjab are excellent. Vijay Varma does justice to the role of romantic hero, that he played first time. Though he tries but fails sometimes in Urdu oratory skills. Fatima Sana Shaikh and Sharib Hahmi are good in their roles, but Naseeruddin Shan is the star attraction of the movie; who showed many layers of his acting prowess as a retired Urdu poet and father. This is not a masala movie but a soft romantic movie."

Shubhra Gupta of Indian Express gave 2 out of 5 stars saying, "Gustakh Ishk is kind of film that is set in 1990s but looks more from 60s or 70s. The dialogue heavy film makes you lacking the feeling. The film has two terrific performers in Shah and Varma meanders in the first time and rarely picks up pace. Portions shot between Varma, his brother and mother look too much of a set, a slip not expected from a film produced by Manish Malhotra. Saving grace of the film is Naseeruddhin Shah and his flawless control over Urdu and oration of poetry."

Amit Bhatia of ABP Live has given the film an outstanding rating of 4 out of 5, "The film gives viewers a great feeling. The film is best for those like to watch love stories. The film is like a free-flowing poetry. The film scores in all aspects, be it performance, story, poetry, music and direction. Acting by Naseeruddin Shah is by far the best of all. Vijay Varma has also done great, and Fatima who looks effortlessly great has given a matured performance. Shareeb Hashmi has also done justice to his role. Music by Vishal Bharadwaj and lyrics by Gulzar are excellent and a couple of more songs would have been great. Even the script and direction are excellent. The film is a treat to watch."
