= Anay Goswamy =

Indian film Cinematographer (born 1977)

- Born: 16 August 1977 (age 48); Chandigarh, India
- Occupation: Cinematographer

Anay Goswamy (born 16 August 1977) is an Indian cinematographer. He is a graduate from the Government College of Arts, Chandigarh and Film and Television Institute of India.

== Filmography ==
Year	Film	Language	Notes
2005	Chauras Chand	Hindi	Short film
2006	Chabiwali Pocket Watch	Hindi	Short film
2008	Dil Kabaddi	Hindi	
2008	Mumbai Cutting	Hindi	
2010	The Japanese Wife	Bengali	
2011	No One Killed Jessica	Hindi	
2013	Kai Po Che	Hindi	
2016	Fitoor	Hindi	
2017	Mom	Hindi	
2017	Qaidi Band	Hindi	
2019	Super 30	Hindi	
2022	Shamshera	Hindi	
2023	Tiger 3	Hindi	
2024	Mr. & Mrs. Mahi	Hindi	

== Awards and nominations ==
- Won Star Entertainment Award for Best Cinematography for The Japanese Wife
- Won Best Cinematography award in the 'Emerging Filmmakers' section at Cannes Film Festival for Chabiwali Pocket Watch (2006)
- Won Kodak Award (Asia Pacific region) for Chabiwali Pocket Watch

== Sources ==
- The Japanese Wife NOW AN AWARD WINNING LOVE POEM
- tribuneindia.com
- https://web.archive.org/web/20110723085639/http://motion.kodak.com/motion/uploadedFiles/japaneseWife.pdf
