= Fireflies (2014 film) =

- Theatrical release poster
- Directed by: Sabal Singh Shekhawat
- Written by: Sabal Singh Shekhawat
- Produced by: Sabal Singh Shekhawat
- Starring: Rahul Khanna; Arjun Mathur; Shivani Ghai; Monica Dogra; Aadya Bedi
- Cinematography: Shanker Raman
- Edited by: Shan Mohammed
- Music by: Zubin Balaporia
- Distributed by: Wild Geese Pictures
- Release date: 31 October 2014
- Running time: 105 minutes
- Country: India
- Language: Hindi

Fireflies is a 2018 Bollywood drama film, directed and produced by Sabal Singh Shekhawat. The language of the film is mostly in English. The film has an ensemble cast, which includes Rahul Khanna, Arjun Mathur, Shivani Ghai, Monica Dogra and Aadya Bedi. This film is written and produced by the director Sabal Singh.

== Plot summary ==
The film is a story of a family having two brothers and a sister. Story based in lifestyle of Mumbai where they struggle for love, and companionship.

== Cast ==
- Rahul Khanna as Shiv
- Arjun Mathur as Rana Rathore
- Shivani Ghai as Sharmila
- Monica Dogra as Michelle
- Aadya Bedi as Maya
- Arjun Deswal as Young Shiv
- Kunaal Kyhaan as Young Shiv

== Critical response ==
NDTV rated the film 3.5 out of 5 stars, and said "Fireflies is an imperfect film about flawed characters who disguise their spiritual ennui in tailored postures of sophistication. It's not a great film. But it's sincere and a largely well-crafted piece of cinema about fractured lives frozen in compromised relationships". Indian Express rated the film 1.5 out of 5 stars. Sweta Kaushal of Hindustan Times gave the film 1.5 out of 5 stars taking on originality, said that "The well-meaning plot of Fireflies is totally wasted for a singular lack of imagination and the over-dependence on stereotypes. Skip this one, unless you are looking for a depressing movie that only confirms to all norms of cliches in the name of an Indie film". Renuka Vyavahare of The Times of India gave the film 2.1 out of 5 stars.
