= Chigusa Takaku =

Japanese actress (born 1978)

- Born: 11 August 1978 (age 48); Tokyo, Japan
- Occupation: Actress

Chigusa Takaku (高久 ちぐさ, Takaku Chigusa; born 11 August 1978 in Tokyo) is a Japanese actress. She has appeared in a number of Japanese TV dramas and films.

In 2010, she appeared in Aparna Sen's Bengali Film The Japanese Wife as the leading female opposite Rahul Bose.

== Television ==
- The Great Horror Family (2004)
- Taiga drama Yoshitsune (2005)
- GoGo Sentai Boukenger (2006)
- Hanayome wa Yakudoshi! (2006)
- Mop Girl (2007)
- Je t'aime Watashi wa Kemono (2008)
- Samurai Code (2010)
- Zettai Reido (2010)
- Shokuzai (2012)

== Films ==
- Chikatetsu ni Notte (2006)
- Summer Wars (2009) as Nana Jinnouchi (voice)
- The Japanese Wife (2010) as Miyage
