= Everybody Says I'm Fine! =

2001 film by Rahul Bose

- Poster
- Directed by: Rahul Bose
- Written by: Rahul Bose
- Produced by: Vivek Vaswani
- Starring: Rehaan Engineer; Koel Purie; Rahul Bose; Pooja Bhatt; Anahita Oberoi; Boman Irani
- Cinematography: Vikas Sivaraman
- Edited by: Suresh Pai
- Music by: Zakir Hussain
- Distributed by: Pinnacle Entertainments
- Release date: 12 September 2001
- Running time: 103 minutes
- Country: India
- Language: English

Everybody Says I'm Fine! is a 2001 Indian English-language drama film, written and directed by Rahul Bose in his directorial debut.

The film premiered on 12 September 2001 at the Toronto International Film Festival. For his work on Everybody Says I'm Fine!, Bose was the runner-up to John Schlesinger for the Best Directorial Debut Award at the 2003 Palm Springs International Film Festival.

== Plot ==
The film revolves around a small group of elite Mumbaikars whose lives converge at a hairdresser's salon. Xen owns the salon and has a unique gift of connecting with the minds of his clients and reading their thoughts while at work. Most of his customers maintain a facade of normality in order to gain semblance and hide their tumultuous lives to some extent.

As backdrop to Xen's ability, it is revealed that as a young boy, he witnessed the death of his parents in a freak accident at a recording studio, where nobody could hear his cries for help through the sound-proof booth as he saw the flames rising. Ever since, Xen's life plunged into some sort of forced silence. Xen uses his gift to help most of his clients, notably Tanya, whose private life is being indecently probed into by another one of his customers, Misha. Xen manages to get the dirt on Misha, who is a secret cocaine addict, and more unsavory details surface where it comes to knowledge that Misha has even gotten some children at the orphanage she works at addicted to it. Xen slips the information to Tanya without her knowledge, who then confronts Misha with it when Misha becomes a little too inquisitive in Tanya's personal affairs.

Xen is however, clueless in his own silence, and to add to it, he is unable to probe into the mind of one of his customers, Nikki/Nikita, who comes to the salon one day and asks him to cut off all her long hair. He begins to develop feelings for her, sensing some form of distress in her being, unable to reach her but somehow wanting to help.

Later, as Xen serves one of his regulars, a respectable businessman, Mr. Mittal, it transpires that the married Mr. Mittal is busy planning a liaison with another woman. More facts slowly unfold to reveal Mr Mittal is, in fact, Nikki's father, and Nikki has been subjected to an incestuous relationship. Enraged, on gradually learning the truth straight from the thoughts of his client, Xen strikes a heavy blow to Mr. Mittal's head, killing him, and later disposing of the body.

The death of her father triggers in Nikki a sudden response, and she crumbles to the ground in Xen's arms. He is now engulfed in her disconcerting train of thoughts, disjointed, and echoing her torment of many years. The final scene of the film shows Xen waking the next morning to find the silence in his life is now beyond him, and he can hear, as clearly and wholly as the next human being. Nikki embraces him; the mutual catharsis has made them both more wholesome beings.

== Cast ==
- Rehan Engineer as Xen
- Koel Purie as Nikita "Nikki"
- Rahul Bose as Rage
- Pooja Bhatt as Tanya Ruia
- Anahita Uberoi as Misha
- Boman Irani as Mr. Mittal

== Soundtrack ==
Everybody Says I'm Fine

Soundtrack album by Zakir Hussain
- Released: July 2002
- Genre: Feature film soundtrack
- Length: 52:21
- Label: Universal

Zakir Hussain chronology
Remember Shakti: Saturday Night in Bombay (Live) (2001)	Everybody Says I'm Fine (2002)	Selects (2002)

The film's soundtrack was composed by tabla player Zakir Hussain. Released by Universal, it was the first Indian soundtrack to feature Carlos Santana.

Track #	Song	Singer(s)
1	"Everybody Says I'm Fine"	Carlos Santana, Sanjay Swamy, Piyush Kanojia, Salim Merchant and Taufiq Qureshi
2	"Zindagi"	Zakir Hussain, Ram Shankar, Ravi Khote, Dominique Manuel, Piyush Kanojia, Salim Merchant and Taufiq Qureshi
3	"Secret Key"	Samantha Edwards and George Brooks
4	"Somewhere"	Rahul Bose, George Brooks, Piyush Kanojia, Salim Merchant and Taufiq Qureshi
5	"Tanya's Theme"	Ganesh and Kumaresh
6	"The Search"	Talat Aziz, Piyush Kanojia, Sali Merchant and Taufiq Qureshi
7	"Everybody Says I'm Fine (Club Edit)"	Carlos Santana, Sanjay Swamy, Piyush Kanojia, Salim Merchant and Taufiq Qureshi
8	"Zindagi (Classic)"	Ram Shankar
9	"Listen to Your Heart"	Black Church Gospels
10	"Secret Key (The Kiss)"	Ustad Sultan Khan and George Brooks
11	"Somewhere (Sweetness)"	Zakir Hussain and Ronu Mazumdar
12	"Discovery"	Zakir Hussain, Piyush Kanojia, Saleem Merchant and Taufiq Qureshi
13	"I'm Free"	Salim Merchant
14	"Everybody Says I'm Fine (C's Magic)"	Carlos Santana and Sanjay Swamy
15	"Zindagi (Club Edit)"	Zakir Hussain, Ram Shankar, Ravi Khote, Dominique Manuel, Piyush Kanojia, Salim Merchant and Taufiq Qureshi
