= Mumbai Matinee =

2003 Indian film by Anant Balani

- Directed by: Anant Balani
- Written by: Anant Balani
- Produced by: Bobbie Ghosh; Rangita Pritish Nandy
- Starring: Rahul Bose; Perizaad Zorabian; Vijay Raaz; Saurabh Shukla
- Cinematography: Sanjay Nair
- Edited by: Mohammed Rafique
- Music by: Anand Raj Anand; Farhad Wadia
- Distributed by: Pritish Nandy Communications (PNC)
- Release date: 26 September 2003
- Running time: 125 minutes
- Country: India
- Languages: Hindi; English

Mumbai Matinee is a 2003 Indian romantic comedy film directed and written by Anant Balani and starring Rahul Bose as a 32-year-old virgin. The film premiered on 26 September 2003 and was also released in the UK. Director Anant Balani died before the film was released on 29 August 2003.

== Plot ==
Debu is a 32-year-old advertising agent but has a serious problem in that he is still a virgin. He meets Baba Hindustani in a hotel who promises to cure him of the teasing he gets from being a virgin. He later meets Nitin Kapoor, a filmmaker who later films him as he works out in the gym and other physical activities. Unaware of what is happening, Kapoor edits the film in such a way to give the impression of Debu as having sex. The film is released and becomes a box office hit, and Debu quickly becomes a sex symbol. He later meets Sonali Verma, a journalist, who helps him through his difficulties, and they later fall in love.

== Cast ==
- Rahul Bose as Debashish Chatterjee (Debu)
- Perizaad Zorabian as Sonali Verma
- Vijay Raaz as Baba Hindustani
- Saurabh Shukla as Nitin Kapoor
- Anusha Dandekar as Anusha, the temptress
- Asrani as Pyarelal
- Sanjay Gandhi as Rohan Khanna
- Shehzad Khan as Don
- Prithvi Zutshi as Police Inspector
- Pinky Chinoy as Prostitute
- Bakul Thakkar as Roshan Kumar

== Soundtrack ==
Mumbai Matinee

Soundtrack album by Anand Raaj Anand & Farhad Wadia
- Released: 1 June 2003
- Genre: Feature film soundtrack
- Length: 43:00
- Label: Times Music

- Anand Raj Anand - composer of the song "Loot Gaye"
- KK
- Shantanu Mukherjee
- Sonu Nigam
- Saswati Phukan
- Farhad Wadia

=== Track list ===
1. "Tera Dekh Ke Najara Tobba Tobba Mere Yara (Loot Gaye)" - Shashwati
2. "Tere Bina Mai Jiu Aise" - Kunal Ganjawala
3. "Ye Hai Mumbai" - Sonu Nigam
4. "You" - Shaan
5. "Bumbai Se Aaya Mera Dost" - Abbey
6. "Sex Is Good" - K. K.
7. "Shame" - Joe Alvares
8. "Tere Bina Mai Jiu Aise (2)" - Kunal Ganjawala

== Critical reception ==
Taran Adarsh of Bollywood Hungama gave the film a rating of 1 out of 5 and said that, "The film has an interesting plot in fact a story like this has never been attempted by an Indian film-maker before but how one wishes the twists and turns in the story were captivating enough to keep you glued right till the climax." Shahshi Matta of PlanetBollywood.com gave the film a rating of 4.5 out of 10 saying that, "The film looks hurriedly put-together and the contemplation's of the protagonist at various points in this film (on love, the gay character, etc.) look like they belong to another film. A film that could have been. But clearly wasn’t." R. Swaminathan of Rediff commented on the film saying that, "The film is not everyone's cup of tea. If you are looking for a family entertainer, you are eyeing the wrong film. But if you want time out with your locker room buddies or with your girlfriend, Mumbai Matinee is the film." India Today criticized the film saying that "Matinee's meandering script hobbles on its compelling plot, and by the time the nerd scrambles into bed, you are past caring."
