= Bullets (Indian TV series) =

- Genre: Action, Thriller
- Directed by: Devang Dholakia
- Starring: Sunny Leone; Karishma Tanna; Vivek Vaswani; Deepak Tijori
- Country of origin: India
- Original language: Hindi
- No. of seasons: 1
- No. of episodes: 6

Production
- Producer: Vinay Chaukar
- Production location: India

Original release
- Network: MX Player
- Release: 8 January 2021

Bullets is an Indian action thriller web series directed by Devang Dholakia. The series features Sunny Leone, Karishma Tanna, Vivek Vaswani, Amaan F Khan. The series released on 8 January 2021.

== Cast ==
- Sunny Leone as Tina
- Karishma Tanna as Lolo
- Vivek Vaswani as Hemant Korade
- Deepak Tijori as Ketu
- Mohan Kapur
- Sakshi Pradhan

== Release ==
The official trailer of the web series was launched on 2 January 2021 by MX Player on YouTube.

== Reception ==
Sreeju Sudhakaran of Latesly rated the series 1/5 and stated "The most annoying aspect of Bullets is the ridiculous manner in which the show is edited. The scenes are deliberately arranged in a haphazard manner, so that the screenplay may look intelligent, but all the idea does is basically confuse the hell out of you."

Pankaj Shukla from Amar Ujala also gave the 1 star out of 5.
