= Split Wide Open =

- Promotional poster for Split Wide Open
- Directed by: Dev Benegal
- Written by: Farrukh Dhondy (screenplay); Dev Benegal (story); Upamanyu Chatterjee (story); Sudhir Mishra (Hindi dialogues); Shozo Ichiyama (Japanese dialogues)
- Produced by: Anuradha Parikh
- Starring: Rahul Bose; Laila Rouass; Ayesha Dharkar; Shivaji Satham
- Cinematography: Sukumar Jatania
- Edited by: Renu Saluja
- Music by: Nitin Sawhney
- Production companies: Adlabs; BMG-Crescendo; Tropicfilm
- Distributed by: 20th Century Fox
- Release dates: 1 September 1999 (Venice Film Festival); 4 November 1999 (Tokyo International Film Festival); 8 April 2000 (Singapore International Film Festival); 24 March 2000 (India)
- Running time: 107 minutes
- Country: India
- Language: English

Split Wide Open is a 1999 Indian film directed by Dev Benegal. It is his second feature film after English, August (1994). The film primarily deals with the water conflicts in the slums of Bombay, and paedophilia, and also looks at the subversive sexuality in modern India and how the notions of morality are challenged when sex and poverty collide. The film came under harsh criticism when released in India and has been one of the most controversial Indian films.

== Cast and characters ==
- Rahul Bose as KP (Kut-Price)
- Laila Rouass as Nandita
- Ayesha Dharkar as Leela
- Shivaji Satam as Shiv
- Abhimanyu Sharma as Shiv
- Farida Haider Mulla as Didi
- Kiran Nagarkar as Brother Bono
- Rajika Puri as Auntie
- Virendra Saxena as Altaf
- Aadya Bedi

== Awards and recognition ==
- The official selection at the 1999 Venice Film Festival.
- Awarded a Special Jury Award to the film and the Best Actor award (Rahul Bose) at the 2000 Singapore International Film Festival.
- Won the Grand Prix at the 2000 Belgium International Film Festival.
- Nominated for the Grand Prix at the 2000 Bratislava International Film Festival.

== Soundtrack ==
Split Wide Open

Soundtrack album by Nitin Sawhney
- Released: 21 August 1999
- Genre: Feature film soundtrack
- Length: 54:48
- Label: BMG Crescendo

The original soundtrack of the film consists of 17 total songs with 9 soundtrack songs and 5 instrumental tracks composed by Nitin Sawhney.

Split Wide Open (Original Motion Picture Soundtrack)
No.	Title	Singer(s)	Length
1.	"You are the reason"	Air Supply, Mehnaz Hoosein
2.	"Jaane Na Koi"	Asha Bhosle
3.	"Kurti Da Touch"	Silk Route
4.	"The trick is to keep breathing "	Garbage
5.	"Trapped"	Indus Creed
6.	"Dooba Dooba"	Silk Route
7.	"Duniya"	Raageshwari
8.	"Mera Jee Nahin Lage"	Najam Sheraz
9.	"Dil Se Mera Hai"	Drosnadresd
10.	"Black is black"	Anaida
11.	"Would you like to" (Go to bed with me)	Touch and Go
12.	"Welcome to Bombay"	Nitin Sawhney
13.	"Aaj Aaj Eri Sari Oe"	917 Fridanasd
14.	"Yo KP!"	Nitin Sawhney
15.	"For Didi"	Nitin Sawhney
16.	"Television Sting"	Nitin Sawhney
17.	"A Golden Tap" (End Title)	Nitin Sawhney

The film also credits Massive Attack, Nusrat Fateh Ali Khan, Bob Dylan, Mark Knopfler, Pink Floyd, Krome Assassins, Touch and Go, Purvi Parikh, the Dagar Brothers and Kishori Amonkar for their music used in the production of the film.

== Notes ==
Poster Art & Design and Title Images by Artist Jaideep Mehrotra
