= English, August (film) =

1994 film by Dev Benegal

- Directed by: Dev Benegal
- Screenplay by: Dev Benegal
- Based on: English, August by Upamanyu Chatterjee
- Produced by: Anuradha Parikh
- Starring: Rahul Bose; Tanvi Azmi; Mita Vashisht; Shivaji Satam
- Cinematography: Anoop Jotwani; K. U. Mohanan
- Edited by: Dev Benegal; Allyson C. Johnson
- Music by: D. Wood; Vikram Joglekar
- Distributed by: 20th Century Fox
- Release date: 1994
- Running time: 118 minutes
- Country: India
- Language: English

English, August is a 1994 Indian English-language satirical comedy film and director Dev Benegal's first feature film. A humorous and irreverent study of bureaucracy and the Indian Generation X, English, August won several awards at international film festivals.

English, August became the first Indian independent film to break the stranglehold of mainstream Indian Bollywood cinema when it was acquired by 20th Century Fox and became a theatrical success in the country. This has led the way for other low budget, independent movies such as Bombay Boys and Split Wide Open, which are part of the next generation of "middle cinema".

The film is based on the novel of the same name by Upamanyu Chatterjee.

The negatives of the film were spoiled due to flooding at a storage facility of Prasad Studios. There was an unsuccessful attempt at restoration, following which the film was declared a lost film.

In February 2020, a 35 mm print of the film was found in the National Film Archives of India.

On 3rd July 2026, Film Heritage Foundation announced that it was restoring the film in 4K, and that it would have its world premiere at the 83rd Venice International Film Festival. As per Variety magazine, English, August is the second film in the "Venice Classics" lineup.

== Plot summary ==
Agastya Sen (Rahul Bose), nicknamed "English, August", speaks and thinks in English. A lover of poetry, he listens to Miles Davis and rock and reads Marcus Aurelius. He is also an Indian Administrative Service Officer, a member of the most influential and powerful cadre of civil servants in India. He is sent off for a year's training to Madna, the hottest town in the country. Culture shock and a language barrier in his own country follows (August's mother tongue is Bengali). He feels like a foreigner, but must survive.

August is surrounded by wild characters: Srivastava, the pompous head bureaucrat and his wife Malti, the fashion and cultural leader of the town; Sathe, a local pothead and cartoonist; Kumar, the Police Superintendent and connoisseur of porn films; and Vasant, the world's worst cook. August negotiates this provincial creek with the only paddle he can find. Fantasy, daydreams and "self-abuse" become his means of revolt and escape as he escapes from the heat into the mystery and quiet of his secret world of erotic fantasy and contemplation.

== Cast ==
- Rahul Bose as Agastya "August" Sen
- Salim Shah as Ravi Srivastava
- Tanvi Azmi as Malti Srivastava
- Shivaji Satham as Govind Sathe
- Yogendra Tiku as SP Kumar
- Virendra Saxena as Laxman Shankar
- Mita Vashisht as Sita Avery
- Paromita Vohra as Neera

== Reception ==
Reviewing the film at the International Film Festival of India, S. R. Ashok Kumar of The Hindu wrote that "For a debutant the director's work passes muster".

== Awards and recognition ==
- Won the Silver Montgolfiere and the Gilberto Martinez Solares prize for the Best First Film at the 1994 Festival des 3 continents
- Won the Best Feature Film in English at the 1995 National Film Awards, India
- Won a Special Jury Prize at the 1994 Torino International Festival of Young Cinema

== Soundtrack ==
The original soundtrack for the film is composed by D. Wood and consists of the following instrumental tracks.

- "August Blues"
- "By the Sea"
- "Title Theme"
- "Welcome to Madna"
- "End Titles"
