= Dev Benegal =

Indian filmmaker and screenwriter

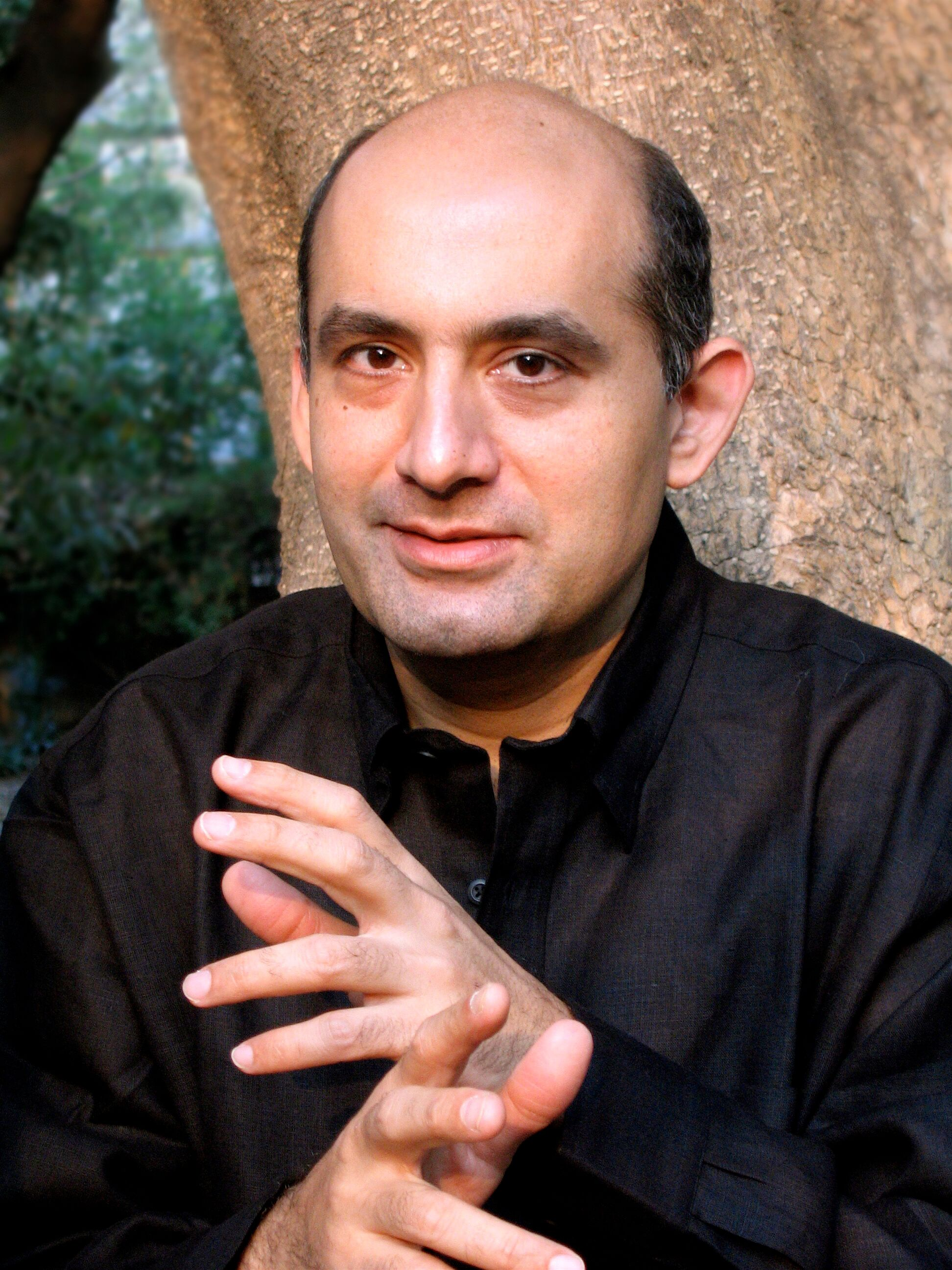
- Born: 28 December 1960 (age 65); New Delhi, India
- Occupations: Film director, Screenwriter, Photographer
- Years active: 1980–present
- Known for: English, August (1994)

Dev Benegal is an Indian filmmaker and screenwriter, most known for his debut film English, August (1994), which won the Best Feature Film in English at the 42nd National Film Awards.

== Early life and education ==
Dev was born in New Delhi to Som Benegal, a theatre director, and his wife Suman.

Dev Benegal grew up in New Delhi. In 1979, he left Delhi for Mumbai (then Bombay), to pursue a career in movies. He won an Asian Cultural Council grant in Film, Video & Photography to study Film History in the Cinema Studies Program at New York University from 1989 to 1990.

== Career ==
=== Early career ===
He began his career with legendary animator Ram Mohan and got his first job with Shashi Kapoor's Filmvalas. After assisting Shyam Benegal in films like Kalyug (1980), Mandi (1983) and his famous documentary on Satyajit Ray—Satyajit Ray, Filmmaker (1984)—Dev Benegal directed a series of short short films, Kalpavriksha: The Tree of Life (1988), Kanakambaram: Cloth: of Gold (1987), and Anantarupam: The Infinite Forms (1987). He directed several documentaries, including Shabana! (2003) with Indian film star Shabana Azmi and Abhivardhan: Building for a New Life (1992).

=== Debut Feature Film and India's National Film Award ===
In 1994 he wrote and directed his adaptation of Upamanyu Chatterjee's 1989 novel by the same name, based on the Indian Administrative Service, English, August (1994). The film received praise from critics for its modern and urban themes and was hailed as the cinematic counterpart to the later Anglo-Indian literary movement. It also won the Best Feature Film in English Award at National Film Awards, and is now hailed as a landmark in contemporary Indian cinema as it ushered in a wave of independent Indian filmmakers, commonly known as "multiplex films" in India.

The New York Times wrote: In "English, August", his first feature film, Mr. Benegal deftly manages the feat of using the scalpel of humor to lay bare a young man's painful but edifying immersion in an alien culture within his own land and to deliver potent sociological and political messages. Irreverent humor, frustrated idealism and earnest compassion are blended with a keen sense of character, place and political reality in the auspicious English, August.

"English, August" won the Special Jury Award at the 12th Torino Film Festival 1994. It won both the Silver Montgolfiere (Silver Grand Prix) and the Gilberto Martinez Solares prize for the Best First Film at the 16th Festival des 3 Continents, Nantes France, 1994

=== Later Films and Upcoming Projects ===
Split Wide Open (1999), another Hinglish film, was also a critical success and won a Special Jury Prize at the 2000 Singapore International Film Festival. Writing for The Hindu, Savitha Padmanabhan said: "Split Wide Open is a bold and strong statement on the filth and lawlessness that have wormed their way into the city of dreams, Mumbai". In an article for The Times of India, the film's lead actor Rahul Bose wrote: "Critics flayed me: After Split Wide Open was released, critics ripped apart my character. To be an English-speaking slum-dweller who is also a smuggler, I spent a month in slums and even shadowed a cocaine-dealer for two weeks. Ironically, the criticism at home turned into praise when I won the Best Actor award for Split Wide Open at the Singapore Film Festival."

Benegal's latest film, Road, Movie (2009), about a travelling cinema troupe in Rajasthan, and starring Abhay Deol and Tannishtha Chatterjee as the lead, premiered at the 2009 Toronto International Film Festival. In its review, The Hollywood Reporter wrote: "Dev Benegal's 'Road, Movie' takes you on a magical mystery tour into the heart of India and its robust cinema. It is, in fact, a road movie without the comma, but it is also about being on the road in a vast Indian landscape and about the phenomenon of touring cinemas that still exist in rural India. The film is specifically Indian, yet designed for wider appreciation in festivals and, if all goes well at the European Film Market, in cross-over releases in international territories."

His project Bombay Samourai was an official selection for the Hong Kong Asia Film Finance Forum (HAF) at the HongKong International Film Festival. This film is in development.

Dev Benegal is also developing a film on the life of mathematician Srinivasa Ramanujan.

== Other works ==
=== 24x7 Making Movies ===
In 2006, Benegal started a production program called 24×7 Making Movies, where he invited young people from all over India to come and make a film in 24 hours. The program has produced over 60 short feature films.

=== Screenwriting ===
Benegal is a long time advisor to eQuinoxe Screenwriting Workshops for Professionals. He has been invited by Under The Volcano, the international program of writing master classes to create and conduct a screenwriting master class for their 2020 program.

== Themes and style ==
Pritish Nandy while describing Benegal's films, said: "Dev Benegal spearheads the brat pack of movie directors who are all out to prove that indian movies is not all pelvis thrusting and running around trees."

An academic paper (Prateek, Prateek. (2013). "Popart": The 'global' avatar of bollywood. 5. 247-257) on Bollywood draws upon insights from his work and describes it as follows: "Benegal's cinematic dialogue with Indianness of English along with Englishness of India, with narratives of belonging, and with the compacted heterogeneity of urban-industrial India, established in his early cinema... Benegal understands the gravity of the national metaphor of 'unity in diversity', and tries to manifest it in the polyphony of various languages and different dialects – English, Hindi, and Telugu. Equally important are his 'artistic' story-telling skills, a trait usually found in the art cinema: the capacity to create credible characters (human or otherwise, like Dadru, the frog) and cultures, skilful scene-setting, mastery of pace and timing, and power of imagination."

== Filmography ==
Year	Title	Awards / Notes
2025	Everything is Not Okay (In post production)	
2024	Ink and Ivory (In post production)	A film on James Ivory for the Metropolitan Museum of Art, New York
2009	Road, Movie	Toronto International Film Festival (2009): Premiere & Special Presentation; Berlin International Film Festival (2010): Opening Night film
1999	Split Wide Open	Singapore International Film Festival (2000): Special Jury Prize; Turnhout International Film Festival Belgium (2000): The Grand Prix Award
1994	English, August	Festival des 3 Continents (1994): Silver Montgolfiere (Silver Grand Prix); Festival des 3 Continents (1994): Gilberto Martinez Solares (Best First Film); Torino International Film Festival (1994): Special Jury Award; National Film Awards (1995): Best Feature Film in English

== Screenplays ==
Year	Title	Awards / Notes
2023	A Love Supreme (feature film)	Feature Film. Official Selection at Co-Production Market, Film Bazaar 2023, Goa International Film Festival of India, Goa 2023.
2022	The Violet Hour (feature film)	Adapted from novel Moon Goddess by Niti Sampat Patel
2020	Lost River (Pilot for Limited Series)	
2020	Blink of an Eye (Pilot for Limited Series)	
2019	Tempest	
2018	The Revenge of the Non-Vegetarian	Based on a novel by Upamanyu Chatterjee
2018	Further to Fly	From the story "Occupant" by Meera Nair
2015	Dark Fiber	
2014	Dead, End	Network of Asian Fantastic Films Prize
2012	Stairway to Heaven	
2010	Samurai	Official selection at the Hong Kong Asia Film Finance Forum
2009	Road, Movie	Official selection of Atelier du Cannes at the Cannes Film Festival
1999	Split Wide Open	
1994	English, August	

== Documentaries ==
Year	Title	Awards / Notes
2024	Ink and Ivory (In Post Production)	A journey into the mind of the American auteur James Ivory and his love of Indian drawings and paintings for a show at the Metropolitan Museum New York.
2021	Water and Ink	Art and atmosphere from the worlds of Islam at the Metropolitan Museum New York in collaboration with curator Navina Haidar.
2003	Shabana!	Opening film at New York Film Festival's tribute to legendary Indian film star Shabana Azmi
1997	Merchants & Marxists: Stones of the Raj	Stones of the Raj series for Channel Four
1993	Field of Shadows	South for Channel Four
1992	Abhivardhan: Building for a New Life	
1988	Kalpavriksha: The Tree of Life	Official Selection 1st Bombay International Film Festival (1990); Indian Documentary Producers Association Awards for Excellence (1988): Certificate of Merit
1987	Kanakambaram: Cloth of Gold	Official Selection 1st Bombay International Film Festival (1990); Official Selection "Indian Panorama" at the Indian International Film Festival New Delhi (1989)
1987	Anantarupam: The Infinite Forms	Official Selection 12th Asian American International Film Festival New York (1989); Indian Documentary Producers Association Awards for Excellence (1987): Special Jury Award; Indian Documentary Producers Association Awards for Excellence (1987): Best Cinematography

== Awards ==
Year	Nominated work	Category	Result	Notes
2014	Dead, End (screenplay)	Network of Asian Fantastic Films Prize	Won	Hong Kong International Film Festival
2011	Road, Movie	Best Sound for Vikram Joglekar	Won	17th Annual Star Screen Awards
2010	Road, Movie	Golden Duke Award	Nominated	Odesa International Film Festival
2009	Road, Movie	Tokyo Sakura Grand Prix Award	Nominated	Tokyo International Film Festival
2000	Split Wide Open	Special Jury Prize	Won	Singapore International Film Festival
2000	Split Wide Open	Silver Screen Award	Nominated	Singapore International Film Festival
2000	Split Wide Open	The Grand Prix	Won	Turnhout International Film Festival Belgium (Focus Op Het Zuiden)
2000	Split Wide Open	Grand Prix	Nominated	Bratislava International Film Festival
2000	Split Wide Open	Best Actor for Rahul Bose	Won	Singapore International Film Festival
1995	English, August	Best Feature Film in English	Won	National Film Awards
1994	English, August	Silver Montgolfiere (Silver Grand Prix)	Won	Festival des 3 Continents
1994	English, August	Golden Montgolfiere (Golden Grand Prix)	Nominated	Festival des 3 Continents
1994	English, August	Gilberto Martinez Solares (Best First Film)	Won	Festival des 3 Continents
1994	English, August	Special Jury Award	Won	Torino International Film Festival
1994	English, August	Prize of the City of Torino	Nominated	Torino International Film Festival
1988	Kalpavriksha	Certificate of Merit	Won	Indian Documentary Producers Association Awards for Excellence
1987	Anantarupam	Special Jury Award	Won	Indian Documentary Producers Association Awards for Excellence
1987	Anantarupam	Best Cinematography	Won	Indian Documentary Producers Association Awards for Excellence
