= Anusha Dandekar =

Indian-Australian singer and actress

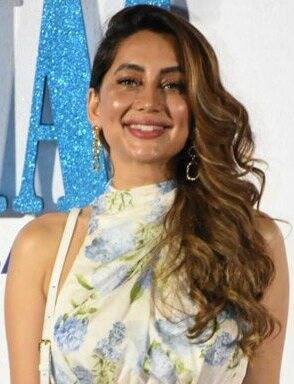
- Dandekar in 2023
- Born: 9 January 1982 (age 44); Khartoum, Sudan
- Citizenship: Australia
- Occupations: VJ; host; actress; singer; model
- Years active: 2003–present
- Relatives: Shibani Dandekar (sister); Farhan Akhtar (brother-in-law)

Anusha Dandekar (born 9 January 1982) is an Indian-Australian VJ, actress, and singer based in India. She is best known as a television host on MTV India and for her appearances in Bollywood films. Dandekar has also worked as a judge on reality television and has been active in music, fashion, and advocacy.

== Early life ==
Anusha Dandekar was born on 9 January 1982 in Khartoum, Sudan, to a Marathi family from Pune, India.

She was raised in Kingsgrove, a suburb of Sydney, Australia, along with her sisters Shibani and Apeksha Dandekar. In the early 2000s, she moved to Mumbai to pursue a career in the entertainment industry.

== Career ==
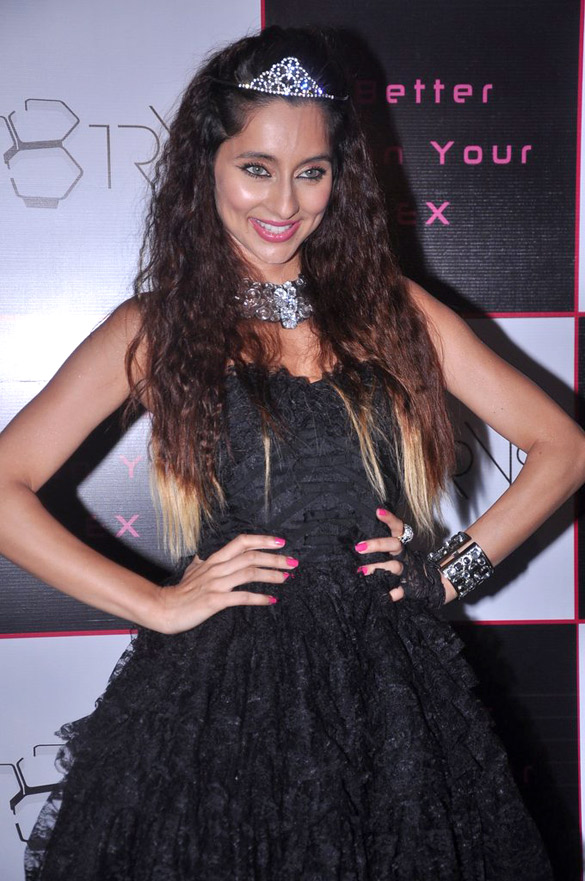
Dandekar at the launch of her first single

In 2002, at the age of 19, Dandekar moved to Mumbai, Maharashtra to pursue a career in the entertainment industry. She was cast as an anchor in MTV's House of Style. She later hosted MTV Dance Crew, MTV Teen Diva, MTV News and MTV Love School for the network.

In 2008, she won Best VJ at the Cosmopolitan Fun Fearless Female Awards. As of 2014, Dandekar is a judge on India's Next Top Model alongside model-actress Lisa Haydon.

In 2003, Dandekar made her acting debut in Bollywood with Mumbai Matinee and went on to do Viruddh in 2005, alongside Bollywood veterans Amitabh Bachchan, Sanjay Dutt, Sharmila Tagore and John Abraham. Her performance in the film won her the Best Debut Award at the Maharashtra Times Awards in 2006. She then went on to star in the musical Miss Bollywood. Later in 2006, she starred in Anthony Kaun Hai? alongside Arshad Warsi and Sanjay Dutt. In 2012, she made her Marathi film debut with her role in Jai Jai Maharashtra Majha.

In 2012, Dandekar made her music debut with single Better Than Your Ex. The song, in the English language, was released in June.

A fashion icon, Dandekar has also graced the covers of Cosmopolitan, Elle and Seventeen. She has also endorsed the brands Reebok, Toni & Guy, Crocs and Lee Jeans.

In 2017 she became a mentor on a show India's Next Top Model, which is aired on MTV India.

== Discography ==
Year	Title	Peak chart positions			Notes
Year	Title	US	CAN	UK	Notes
2012	Better Than Your Ex	—	—	—	Single
"—" denotes a recording that did not chart or was not released in that territory.

== Filmography ==
=== Film ===
Year	Title	Role	Notes	Ref.
2003	Mumbai Matinee	Anusha	Hindi-English bilingual film	
2005	Viruddh	Jenny		
2006	Anthony Kaun Hai?	Rosa		
2008	Hello	Shefali		
2010	City of Gold	Manasi		
2010	Lalbaug Parel	Manasi	Marathi film	
2011	Delhi Belly	VJ Sophaya		
2012	Jai Jai Maharashtra Maaza	Ashwini Stevenson	Marathi film	
2018	Bhavesh Joshi Superhero	Dancer in the song "Chavanprash"		
2023	Baap Manus	Krisha	Marathi film	
2024	Juna Furniture	Avni Pathak	Marathi film	

== Awards and nominations ==
Year	Nominee / work	Award	Result	Ref.
2004	Mumbai Matinee	Stardust Award for Most Exciting New Face	Nominated	
2006	Viruddh	Stardust Award for Breakthrough Performance – Female	Nominated	
2006	Viruddh	Maharashtra Times Sanmaan Best Debut Award	Won	
2007	Herself	Filmfare Award for Best Face	Nominated	
2009	Herself	Cosmopolitan Fun Fearless Female Award for Best VJ	Won	
2010	Herself	Femina's List of 50 Most Beautiful Women in India Award	Won	
