= Vibhu Puri =

Indian film director

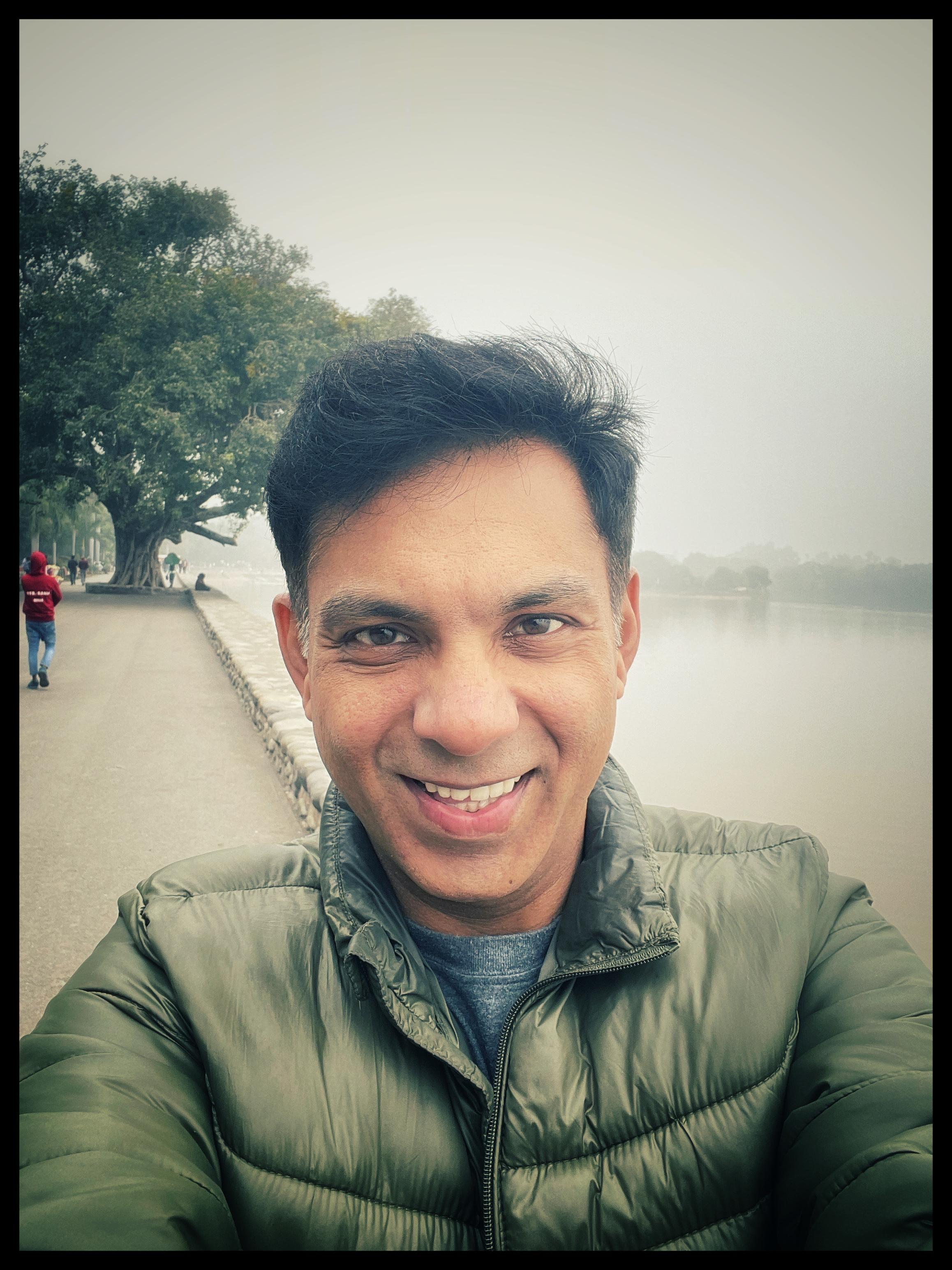
- Puri in 2025
- Born: Vibhu Puri; 28 January 1980 (age 46); Delhi, India
- Education: Film and Television Institute of India
- Occupations: Director; screenwriter; songwriter
- Years active: 2004-present

Vibhu Virendra Puri (born 28 January 1980) is an Indian director, screenwriter and songwriter. After graduating from FTII, he started assisting Sanjay Leela Bhansali and co-wrote two of his films; Saawariya (2007) and Guzaarish (2010). He has directed and written dialogues for the popular web series Heeramandi and Taj: Reign of Revenge. He made his feature film directorial debut with Hawaizaada (2015). Apart from films, he has directed many television commercials. His latest feature Gustaakh Ishq featuring Naseeruddin shah, Vijay Verma, Fatima Sana Sheikh and Sharib Hashmi released on 28th of November, 2025.

== Career ==
A gold medalist from the Film and Television Institute of India (FTII), Vibhu Puri's debut feature as a director and producer, Hawaizaada, featuring Mithun Chakraborty and Ayushmann Khurrana. It is the untold story of Shivkar Bapuji Talpade, who is claimed to have been the first to build a plane. In January 2015, the film opened to great reviews by critics, though it did not make a huge impact at the box office.

Before making his feature, Puri assisted Sanjay Leela Bhansali on various feature films. He also wrote Saawariya, Guzaarish and Shirin Farhad Ki Toh Nikal Padi, all made by SLB Films. To add to it, Puri also penned songs for Guzaarish and Hawaizaada. He also assisted Vishal Bharadwaj on The Blue Umbrella.

In the world of advertising, he started off as a writer in Contract Delhi before getting into filmmaking. In the last three years, he has been directing commercials. He has directed more than 150 films and has collaborated on campaigns with various agencies like Ogilvy, McCann, Leo Burnett, Scarecrow, Rediff, and Mudra amongst others for major brands like Maggi, HDFC, Reckitt Benckiser, P&G, Zee, Heinz, Star Sports, Dabur, Parle G, Himani, Emami, and Amazon. Puri has made films for Indian, Pakistani and Bangladeshi agencies and brands. Besides Hindi and English, he has made ad films in various languages like Telugu, Malayalam, Haryanvi, and Bangla.

Two of Puri's student films, Chaurus Chaand and Chabiwali Pocket Watch, have traveled to various film festivals in India and abroad. Both of them had the unique distinction of being selected for Indian Panorama. Chauras Chaand is an ode to the life and poetry of rebel Punjabi poet Avtar Singh Sandhu ('Pash'). Chabiwali Pocket Watch featured at many festivals including Cannes (where it was awarded Kodak emerging filmmaker of the world, 2006); has won various international awards, and also the national award from the Indian president. The film is set in Old Delhi and deals with story of a romantic Urdu poet now dying anonymously, and the struggle between his daughter and an opportunist publisher. This film was also India's official entry to the Student Oscars, 2006.

He has also served on the jury of the 57th National Awards, 2009.

== Discography ==
| Year | Song | Album | Composer |
|---|---|---|---|
| 2010 | "Sau Gram Zindagi" | Guzaarish | Sanjay Leela Bhansali |
| 2010 | "Saiba" | Guzaarish | Sanjay Leela Bhansali |
| 2010 | "Chaand Ki Katori" | Guzaarish | Sanjay Leela Bhansali |
| 2013 | "Gaali Dete Hoton Ko" | Chor Chor Super Chor | Mangesh Dhakde |
| 2013 | "Na Ishq Kariyo Jhalle" | Chor Chor Super Chor | Mangesh Dhakde |
| 2013 | "Jai Ram Ji Ki" | Chor Chor Super Chor | Mangesh Dhakde |
| 2013 | "Abey Chup Kar" | Chor Chor Super Chor | Mangesh Dhakde |
| 2015 | "Hawaizaada" | Hawaizaada | Rochak Kohli |
| 2015 | "Daak Ticket" | Hawaizaada | Rochak Kohli |
| 2015 | "Maazaa My Lord" | Hawaizaada | Mangesh Dhakde |
| 2015 | "Udd Jayega" | Hawaizaada | Mangesh Dhakde |
| 2015 | "Dil Todne Ki Masheen" | Hawaizaada | Vishal Bhardwaj |
| 2015 | "Yaadein Gatthri Mein" | Hawaizaada | Mangesh Dhakde |
| 2015 | "Turram Khan" | Hawaizaada | Rochak Kohli |
| 2015 | "Teri Dua" | Hawaizaada | Mangesh Dhakde |

== Filmography ==
=== Films ===
| Year | Title | Credited as | | | Notes |
| Year | Title | Director | Screenwriter | Producer | Notes |
|---|---|---|---|---|---|
| 2004 | Chaurus Chaand | Yes | Yes | No | Documentary short |
| 2006 | Chabiwali Pocket Watch | Yes | Yes | No | Short |
| 2007 | Saawariya | No | Yes | No | Also associate director |
| 2010 | Guzaarish | No | Dialogues | No | |
| 2014 | Tigers | No | Dialogues | No | Hindi dialogues only |
| 2015 | Hawaizaada | Yes | Yes | Yes | |
| 2016 | 11 Minutes | Yes | No | No | Short |
| 2025 | Gustaakh Ishq | Yes | Yes | No | |

Other roles

| Year | Title | Role |
|---|---|---|
| 2005 | The Blue Umbrella | Assistant director |
| 2012 | Shirin Farhad Ki Toh Nikal Padi | Additional screenplay |
| 2013 | Chor Chor Super Chor | Choreographer |

=== Television ===
| Year | Title | Credited as | | Notes |
| Year | Title | Director | Screenwriter | Notes |
|---|---|---|---|---|
| 2023 | Taj: Divided by Blood | Yes | Dialogues | |
| 2024 | Heeramandi: The Diamond Bazaar | Yes | Yes | Also Episodic director |

=== Music videos ===
| Year | Title | Artist(s) |
|---|---|---|
| 2021 | "Mehendi" | Dhvani Bhanushali & Vishal Dadlani |
