= Viruddh =

- Theatrical release poster
- Directed by: Mahesh Manjrekar
- Written by: Screenplay: Mahesh Manjrekar; Yash-Vinay; Dialogues: Sanjay Pawar
- Story by: Mahesh Manjrekar
- Produced by: Amitabh Bachchan
- Starring: Amitabh Bachchan; Sharmila Tagore; John Abraham; Sanjay Dutt; Anusha Dhandekar
- Narrated by: John Abraham
- Cinematography: Vijay Kumar Arora
- Edited by: Rahul Bhatawkar
- Music by: Background Score and Guest Composition: Ajay-Atul; Songs: Anand Raj Anand; Roop Kumar Rathod; Bhavdeep Jaipurwale; Ashit Desai; Violin Brothers
- Production companies: Amitabh Bachchan Corporation; Satyajeet Movies
- Distributed by: UTV Motion Pictures
- Release date: 22 July 2005
- Running time: 132 minutes
- Country: India
- Language: Hindi
- Budget: ₹ 90 million
- Box office: ₹ 185.1 million

Virruddh... Family Comes First (transl. Against) is a 2005 Indian Hindi-language drama film directed by Mahesh Manjrekar. The film stars Amitabh Bachchan, Sharmila Tagore, John Abraham and Sanjay Dutt .Viruddh is not a musical, instead the soundtrack is primarily used as background scoring. The 2013 Marathi-language movie 'Kokanastha', also written and directed by Mahesh Manjrekar, is a remake of Viruddh: Family Comes First.

== Plot ==
The film begins with Amar (John Abraham) narrating the story of his family and himself. Amar is the son of Vidyadhar (Amitabh Bachchan) and Sumitra Patwardhan (Sharmila Tagore), a middle-class couple in India. Amar lives and works in London, and he sends some of his salary back home. One day Amar returns home with Jenny Mayer (Anusha Dandekar), his girlfriend, and announces his intention to marry her. Initially reluctant, his parents are pleased and happy for the two. One day, Amar goes out celebrating with his friends, while his parents and Jenny organise a surprise birthday party for him.

Outside a pub, Amar witnesses a murder, and, while trying to apprehend the killer, he gets mortally wounded in the fight. Amar succumbs in the hospital. The assailant is identified as Harshwardhan Kadam (Amitabh Dayal), son of minister Mr. Kadam. Soon, the police start covering the case up. Amar is implicated in false charges of drug peddling. Witnesses and close friends of Amar too give false statements. The torture doesn't end there, as police try to implicate Jenny as his accomplice and threaten to rape her.

Vidyadhar decides that it is not good for Jenny to live there, especially since she is expecting Amar's child. Vidyadhar bails her out and implores her to return to London before she is locked up for good. Meanwhile, Harshwardhan goes scot-free, and Vidyadhar decides to seek justice on his own after he fails to get any sort of justice from the law. Ali Asgar (Sanjay Dutt), a reformed goon and mechanic, also an acquaintance of the Patwardhans, decides to help them. Soon, Ali succeeds in procuring a gun for Vidyadhar, after all efforts to prove Amar's innocence go in vain.

Vidyadhar decides to confront Harshwardhan in his own office. Harshwardhan cockily lets him enter in and starts taunting him. Vidyadhar accuses him, and Harshwardhan arrogantly confesses his crimes, telling Vidyadhar that he cannot prove a thing. Vidyadhar points the gun at him, upon which Harshwardhan calls one of his guards. Vidyadhar guns down Harshwardhan, and the guard enters; moments later, Harshwardhan's cadaver collapses down. Harshwardhan's head guard lets Vidyadhar go, claiming that he won't be able to face his family if he kills Vidyadhar.

After a case is filed against Vidyadhar, he reveals a pocket tape recorder on which the whole confession of Harshwardhan is recorded. Based on this proof, Amar and Vidyadhar are exonerated and set free. In an interview, Vidyadhar makes it clear that he doesn't intend to sue Mr. Kadam or the police since Harshwardhan was killed and Vidyadhar knows the pain.

In the end, it is shown that Vidyadhar is living a happy life with Sumitra, Jenny, and his grandchild. Amar now explains that his father has always been a hero to him since childhood, and he is feeling a little jealous of his daughter, who is being treated with the same affection with which Vidyadhar treated Amar in his childhood. The film ends with Amar disappearing in light, claiming he can now rest peacefully.

== Cast ==
- Amitabh Bachchan as Vidhyadhar Patwardhan
- Sharmila Tagore as Sumitra Patwardhan
- John Abraham as Amar Patwardhan
- Sanjay Dutt as Ali Asgar
- Anusha Dandekar as Jenny
- Prem Chopra as Mr. Sumit Arora
- Sharat Saxena as Mr. Raju Shetty
- Beena as Mrs. Chitnis
- Bipasha Basu as Herself (Cameo)
- Shivaji Satam as Mr. Sunil Bharucha
- Sachin Khedekar as Inspector Desai
- Amitabh Dayal as Harshwardhan Kadam
- Viju Khote as Minister Kadam
- Tom Alter as Mr. Jack Anderson (British Consulate)
- Dimple Inamdar as Sandhya

== Awards ==
51st Filmfare Awards:

=== Nominated ===
- Best Actress – Sharmila Tagore

== Soundtrack ==
The soundtrack of the film was scored by Ajay–Atul.

Track #	Song	Singer(s)	Duration
1	"Bhooli Bisri Yaadon Mein"	Ajit Parab	6:07
2	"Faqeerana Aaye (Bazm-E-Meer)"	Roop Kumar Rathod	5:55
3	"Mann Lago Yaar"	Abida Parveen	8:50
4	"Hey Jag Trata (Ishwar Allah Tere Naam)"	Jagjit Singh	6:42
5	"Shree Ganeshay Dheemahi (Vishwavinayaka)" By AJAY-ATUL	Shankar Mahadevan	6:47
6	"Gham Raha (Bazm-E-Meer)"	Sonali Rathod	5:58
7	"Bhala Hua Meri Matki"	Abida Parveen	7:52
8	"Saahib Mera Ek Hai"	Abida Parveen	7:15
9	"Melancholy"	Instrumental	7:50
