= Ek Din 24 Ghante =

- Directed by: Anant Balani
- Written by: Anant Balani
- Produced by: Devang Dholakia, Vijay Jindhal, Vivek Suchanti
- Starring: Rahul Bose; Nandita Das
- Cinematography: Sanjay Nair
- Music by: Sanju Chakravarty
- Distributed by: Channel Nine Entertainment Ltd.
- Release date: 7 November 2003
- Running time: 95 minutes
- Country: India
- Language: Hindi

Ek Din 24 Ghante (English: "One Day 24 Hours") is a 2003 Indian Hindi-language thriller film directed and written by Anant Balani and starring Rahul Bose and Nandita Das. The film premiered on 7 November 2003. Director Anant Balani died before the film was released on 29 August 2003. The film is an unauthorised adaptation of the 1998 German film Run Lola Run.

== Plot ==
The film revolves around a father-girl-guy relationship. Sameera Dutta is the wild daughter who comes into conflict with her father when she meets Virendra "Viren." Sameera believes she has found true love, but it happens that Viren has a serious gambling problem and owes Rs. 2 million to a casino owner, Patel. Viren seeks Sameera's help, and in desperation and out of resentment for her father, she threatens to reveal to her mother that he has a mistress who is pregnant with his child. When her father fails to give her the money, she places a revolver on his head. Her father not only informs the police but also hires a hitman to kill his daughter. Meanwhile, a strike cripples the city, so Sameera must make her way on foot to the drop-off location to pay off Patel and save Viren's life. After narrowly escaping both the police and her father's hired hitman, Sameera reaches the drop-off. After killing her pursuers, Patel takes the money and lets Viren go. However, Sameera accidentally overhears Viren telling her how he staged the whole incident with Patel to obtain her father's money and that their relationship is a sham. After shooting and killing Viren, Sameera walks away.

== Cast ==
- Rahul Bose as Virendra "Viren" Gupta
- Nandita Das as Sameera Dutta
- Vinit Kumar as Mr. Karan Patel
- Liliput as Stage actor
- Shilpa Mehta as Mrs. Supriya Dutta
- Piyush Mishra as Police Inspector
- Baby Nidhi as Young Sameera
- Kavita Rathod as Sonia Khandelwal
- Kabir Sadanand as Hitman
- Shivkumar Subramaniam as Mr. Vishal Dutta
- Prithvi Zutshi as Mr. Ashwin Kapoor

== Reception ==
=== Box office ===
Ek Din grossed around Rs. 30 lakh in its opening weekend.

=== Critical response ===
Taran Adarsh of IndiaFM gave the film 1 out of 5, writing ″none of the performances really manage to stand out. Nandita Das tries hard to lend credence to her role, but doesn't really impress. Rahul Bose looks dispassionate and goes through his part mechanically. Kabir is strictly okay. On the whole, EK DIN 24 GHANTE neither caters to the intelligentsia, nor the hoi polloi.″ Anjum N of Rediff.com wrote ″For all those who love seeing Hollywood-style thrillers made in Hindi, and don't mind the short duration, Ek Din 24 Ghante is worth a watch.″
