= Weight Loss (novel) =

2006 novel by Upamanyu Chatterjee

- First edition
- Author: Upamanyu Chatterjee
- Cover artist: Sarnath Banerjee
- Language: English
- Genre: Black comedy
- Publisher: Viking Press
- Publication date: 28 February 2006
- Publication place: India
- Media type: Print (Paperback)
- Pages: 432 pp
- ISBN: 0-670-05862-9
- OCLC: 65401887
- Preceded by: The Mammaries of the Welfare State

Weight Loss is a 2006 novel by Upamanyu Chatterjee.

== Plot summary ==
Weight Loss is about the strange life (from age 11 to age 37) of a sexual deviant named Bhola, whose attitude to most of the people around him depends on their lust worthiness. Bhola’s tastes are not, to put it mildly, conventional. Sex is a form of depravity for him and he has fetishes about everyone from teachers to roadside sadhus to servants; he progresses from fantasizing about the portly family cook Gopinath to falling “madly in love” with a vegetable vendor and her husband. This last obsession spans the entire length of the book and most of Bhola’s life – he even ends up teaching at a college in an obscure hill-station hundreds of miles from his home because he wants to be near the couple. At various other stages in his life he gets expelled from school for defecating in a teacher’s office, participates in an inexpertly carried out circumcision (one of the book’s many manifestations of the “weight loss” motif).

== Critical reception ==
Chitralekha Basu writes in a review for The Independent, "There are celebrated examples of authors writing about sexual oddities with great panache, but Chatterjee's attempt completely lacks aesthetic content. The graphic detailing is so clinical, and presented in such random excess, that there's neither passion nor soul in the sex scenes." Alfred Hickling writes in a review for The Guardian, "It makes for a somewhat bloated novel that could well benefit from a few laps of the football field with its arms in the air."
