= Shivaani Ghai =

British actress (born 1975)

- Born: 25 April 1975 (age 51); Newcastle upon Tyne, England
- Other name: Shivani Ghai
- Occupation: Actress
- Spouse: Tyrone Keogh (m. 2016)
- Children: 1
- Relatives: Danny Keogh (father-in-law)

Shivaani (or Shivani) Ghai (born 25 April 1975) is an English actress.

== Early life ==
Ghai is of Indian origin and was born in Newcastle upon Tyne. She grew up in Gosforth and attended Gosforth High School. Later, she went to university, where she gained a BA in film and television studies.

== Career ==
Ghai began her acting career on the London stage, working for companies such as Man Mela, Rifco and Kali. She moved on to television with minor parts in shows such as Doctors, Spooks and The Bill.

In 2003, she was cast as the guest lead in an American adventure series Adventure Inc. alongside Michael Biehn. Later the same year Gurinder Chadha picked Ghai out at a script reading and cast her as the bride and best friend of Aishwarya Rai in Bride and Prejudice. After this, Ghai appeared in BBC shows such as My Hero and Sinchronicity, short films, theatre and commercials. In 2006, she was cast as Sarita Dhavi in Rai Uno's Un medico in famiglia, the popular Italian television programme, when an Indian family was added to the show. She played Sarita Dahvi, which was originally to be cast to an Italian actress of Indian descent, but one could not be found. Ghai could not speak Italian but learnt some scenes for her audition. She became part of the first Indian family on Italian television. After this, Ghai travelled to Tunisia to work on the HBO/BBC co-production House of Saddam, where she played Saddam Hussein's middle daughter Rana. The miniseries aired in September 2008.

In 2009, Ghai filmed a guest lead as Jamilla Sagar, in a series called Identity, starring Aidan Gillen and Keeley Hawes. She filmed a five-part drama called Five Days II (sequel to Bafta and Golden globe nominated Five Days). She played Nusrat Preston, a character described as being "at the heart of the serial". She was also noted in the press for standing out amongst an ensemble cast that included Suranne Jones, Anne Reid, David Morrissey, Bernard Hill, and Steve Evets. She played the part of Rena in the film Cleanskin, which starred Sean Bean and Charlotte Rampling. The film was released in 2012.

In 2012, Ghai appeared in EastEnders playing Ayesha Rana, a friend of Zainab Masood. She first appeared on 17 December 2012. She departed from the show on 1 March 2013.

In 2013, she appeared in Ambassadors as Natalia, the head of public relations in a British Embassy. She also played the role of Batya in the History Channel's The Bible.

She was part of the main cast of the apocalyptic series Dominion. In 2016, Shivani Ghai appeared in ABC's The Catch as Felicity.

In 2019, she appeared in Strike Back: Revolution as a very wealthy Hindu entrepreneur and one of the main villains of the series.

In 2021, she landed a recurring role on Batwoman as the villain Safiyah Sohail in Season Two.

== Personal life ==
She was married to the late British Asian playwright Parv Bancil. In 2014, she met the South African actor Tyrone Keogh on the set of Dominion. They married two years later. They have a son (born 2022).

== Filmography ==
=== Film ===
Year	Title	Role	Notes
2002	Day of the Sirens	Amanda Barnes	
2004	Bride & Prejudice	Bride	
2005	Red Mercury	Secretary	
2005	Goal! The Dream Begins	Ground Attendant	
2007	Road	Jeet	Short
2010	The Bounty Hunter	Nazia	
2010	Rojin	Rojin	Short
2011	Everywhere and Nowhere	Sairah Khan	
2011	Spirit	Sara	Short
2012	Cleanskin	Rena	
2013	Fireflies	Sharmila	
2016	London Life	Paro	
2016	London Has Fallen	Amal Mansoor	

=== Television ===
Year	Title	Role	Notes
2001	Doctors	Joythi	1 episode
2002	The Bill	Young Asian Woman	1 episode
2003	Adventure Inc	Zeyar	1 episode
2005	My Hero	Mother Group Attendee with Baby	1 episode
2005	The Camping Trip	Meera	Television short
2006	Sinchronicity	Shazney	2 episodes
2007	Un medico in famiglia	Sarita	26 episodes
2007	Domenica in	Herself	1 episode
2008	House of Saddam	Rana Hussein	Miniseries: 2 episodes
2010	Five Days	Nusrat Preston	Miniseries: 5 episodes
2010	Identity	Jamilla Atwal	1 episode
2012–13	EastEnders	Ayesha Rana	25 episodes
2013	The Bible	Batya	Docuseries: 1 episode
2013	Ambassadors	Natalia	Miniseries: 3 episodes
2014–15	Dominion	Arika	19 episodes
2016–17	The Catch	Felicity	7 episodes
2019	Strike Back: Revolution	Anjali Vartak	2 episodes
2021	Batwoman	Safiyah Sohail	Recurring role; 8 episodes
2021	Around the World in 80 Days	Aouda	Recurring role

== Awards and nominations ==
Year	Award	Category	Result	Ref.
2013	British Soap Awards	Sexiest Female	Longlisted	
