= Jazbaat (1994 film) =

- Directed by: Anant Balani
- Written by: Sutanu Gupta
- Produced by: Anant Balani
- Starring: Suchitra Krishnamoorthi; Rohit Roy; Reema Lagoo; Mohnish Bahl; Kiran Kumar
- Cinematography: Sanjay Malvankar
- Edited by: Rajkumar Hirani
- Music by: Raamlaxman
- Release date: 8 July 1994
- Country: India
- Language: Hindi

Jazbaat is a 1994 Bollywood romantic film directed by Anant Balani and written by Sutanu Gupta. Starring Suchitra Krishnamoorthi, Rohit Roy, Reema Lagoo, Mohnish Bahl and Kiran Kumar. The film was premiered on 8 July 1994 in Mumbai.

== Cast ==
- Suchitra Krishnamoorthi as Varsha
- Rohit Roy as Vishal Shashtri
- Reema Lagoo as Nirmala
- Mohnish Bahl as Inspector Khan
- Kiran Kumar as Balraj Shashtri, Vishal's father
- Raj Kiran as Inder
- Deepak Shirke as Surma
- Makrand Deshpande as Babban
- Ashutosh Gowarikar as Kishen
- Neena Gupta as Maya
- Vikram Gokhale as Jagdish
- Pradeep Singh Rawat as Inspector Agnihotri
- Anjan Srivastav as Father of Varsha
- Suchitra Bandekar as Employee of Jagdish

== Songs ==
1. "Dil Udta Hai Kya Kahta Hai" - Sameer Date, Asha Bhosle
2. "Ek Tu Hasin" - Asha Bhosle, Sameer Date
3. "Har Kisi Ko" - Alisha Chinai
4. "Khushiya Manane Ki Raat" - Asha Bhosle
5. "Lage Ladkiyo Ke Mamle Me" - Sapna Mukherjee
