= Anant Balani =

Film director and screenwriter

- Born: 1962; India
- Died: 28 August 2003 (aged 40–41); Mumbai, India
- Years active: 1989–2003

Anant Balani (1962 – 29 August 2003) was a Bollywood film director and screenwriter.

He directed films such as Patthar Ke Phool in 1991 which starred Salman Khan and Raveena Tandon in lead roles. He also wrote the script for Insaaf: The Justice, released in 2004.

He died of a heart attack on 29 August 2003 in Mumbai. 2003 had been a strenuous year for him and he had finished three films and was working on a fourth at his time of death. Three of the films that he had directed, namely, Joggers' Park, Mumbai Matinee and Ek Din 24 Ghante were released after his death.

He is an alumnus of the Film and Television Institute of India, Pune, and is credited as a student participant in Holi (1984).

== Filmography ==
- Gawahi (1989)
- Patthar Ke Phool (1991)
- Jazbaat (1994)
- Joggers' Park (2003)
- Mumbai Matinee (2003)
- Ek Din 24 Ghante (2003)
- Chameli (2004) (died during filming)
