= Koel Purie =

Indian actress and film producer

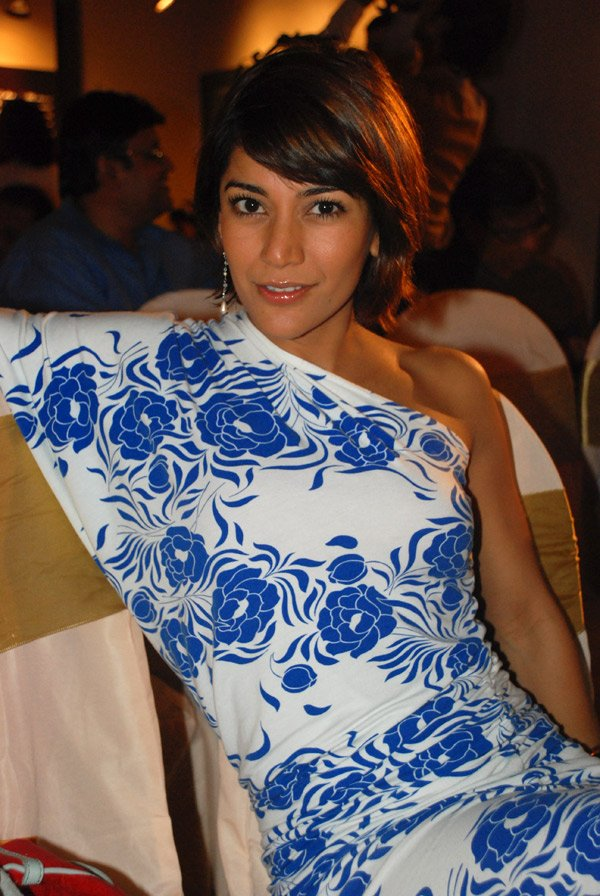
- Born: Delhi, India
- Education: Royal Academy of Dramatic Art
- Occupations: Actress, Film producer
- Years active: 2001–present
- Spouse: Laurent Rinchet
- Father: Aroon Purie
- Relatives: Madhu Trehan (aunt)

Koel Purie Rinchet is an Indian actress, film producer and television presenter.

== Biography ==
Purie made her debut with Rahul Bose's directorial venture Everybody Says I'm Fine! in 2001 and later featured in Road to Ladakh, starring with Irrfan Khan. She trained at the Royal Academy of Dramatic Art London.

Purie has written for publications such as Cosmopolitan, DNA, Harper's Bazaar, and India Today. While living in Tokyo, Purie shot several videos to promote tourism in Japan. Purie lives in Paris, where she produces films through the company 185 Carat Films.

Purie hosted a talk show, On The Couch With Koel, on the Indian news channel Headlines Today. She has produced and hosted various TV shows from Great Escape for Star plus to Aaj Ki Naari for DD metro.

Koel Purie is the daughter of media tycoon Aroon Purie.

== Filmography ==
=== Films & TV ===
Year	Title	Role	language
2001	Everybody Says I'm Fine!	Nikita "Nikki"	English
2004	American Daylight	Sujata a.k.a. Sue	English
2004	Road to Ladakh	Sharon	English
2004	Dirty War	DC Sameena Habibullah	English
2005	White Noise	Gauri	English
2005	Nazar	Sub-Inspector Sujata Deshmukh	Hindi
2006	Mixed Doubles	Kalpana	Hinglish
2006	Mera Dil Leke Dekho		Hindi
2006	The Lookalike		
2007	Life Mein Kabhie Kabhiee	Richa M. Gupta	Hindi
2007	Amal	Pooja Seth	English
2007	It's Breaking News	Vidya	Hindi
2007	The Great Indian Butterfly	Liza	English
2008	Secrets of the Seven Sounds		
2008	Rock On!	Devika	Hindi
2012	10ml LOVE	Minnie	Hindi
2019	The Zoya Factor	Monika, Zoya's boss	Hindi
2023	The Archies	Alice Cooper, Betty's mother	English
2025	Do You Wanna Partner	Malini Mathur	Hindi
2026	Everybody Loves Sohrab Handa	Isha Handa	Hindi

== TV ==
- The Great Escape- Star Plus
- Aaj Ki Naari....Deepika (all episodes)- DD Metro (1998)
- Holby City (1 episode, 2003) - "For Better, for Worse" as Seleena Chowdhury
- The Vice (1 episode, 2003) - "Gameboys" as WPC Charlie Carter
- Indian Dream (2003) as Neeraj
- As If (1 episode, 2004) - "Jamie's POV" as Travel Agent
- The Afternoon Play (1 episode, 2005) - "Reverse Psychology" as Sonia Bhose
- Losing Gemma (2006) as Coral
- Fairy Tales (1 episode, 2008) - "The Empress's New Clothes" as Shekeelia
- On the Couch with Koël (2008-2012) - Headlines Today
- Couching with Koël (2013-2015) - India Today TV
