= Upamanyu Chatterjee =

Indian writer

- Born: 1959 (age 66–67); Patna, Bihar, India
- Education: St. Xavier's School, Delhi, St. Stephen's College, Delhi
- Occupation: Author
- Writing career
- Genre: Novel

Upamanyu Chatterjee (born 1959) is an author and a retired Indian civil servant. His works include the novel English, August: An Indian story, The Last Burden, The Mammaries of the Welfare State and Weight Loss. In 2008, he was awarded the Ordre des Arts et des Lettres for his contribution to literature.

== Biography ==
Chatterjee was born in 1959 in Patna, Bihar. He attended Delhi University, graduated from St. Stephens College, and became a 1983 batch Indian Administrative Service officer. He became a Writer in Residence at the University of Kent in 1990. He became a Director in the Ministry of Human Resource Development in India in 1998.

== Major works ==
Chatterjee has written and published short stories since the 1980s, including stories republished in the 2019 collection The Assassination of Indira Gandhi.

His 1988 novel, English, August : An Indian story was adapted into the film English, August. His novel The Last Burden was published in 1993. A sequel to English, August, The Mammaries of the Welfare State was published in 2000. His fourth novel, Weight Loss, a dark comedy, was published in 2006. His fifth novel Way To Go, a sequel to The Last Burden, was published in 2010 and longlisted for the Man Asian Literary Prize. In 2014, he published Fairy Tales at Fifty. Indrapramit Das writes in a review for The Hindu Business Line, "Like a David Lynch film set in India, Upamanyu Chatterjee’s latest book is a monstrous fairytale that respects the darkness of the real world." In 2018, his novella The Revenge of the Non-vegetarian was published. Pratik Kanjilal writes in a review for The Indian Express, "In a way, it is a back story to his first novel". Uddalak Mukherjee writes in a review for The Telegraph, "Writers cannot be faulted for turning towards their most successful work for inspiration after dishing out a few ordinary books", and "The result [...] is a pacy, tautly-written narrative."

In The Hindu, Anjana Sharma equates Upamanyu's vision of humanity with W.B. Yeats. She writes, "Eighty years apart, cultures, civilisations, even craft and temperament apart, Yeats and Chatterjee share an identical vision of a de-centered, de-natured world." Mukul Dikshit opines that Chatterjee has, for the first time, focused on a "new class" of Westernised urban Indians who were hitherto ignored in the regional as well as the English fiction of India.

== Awards ==
In 2009, he was awarded Officier de l'Ordre des Arts et des Lettres in recognition of his "exemplary contribution to contemporary literature" In 2004, he was awarded the Sahitya Akademi Award for The Mammaries of the Welfare State. The novel Way To Go was shortlisted for The Hindu Best Fiction Award in 2010. He also won JCB Prize for literature, 2024 for the book "Lorenzo Search For The Meaning Of Life"

== Bibliography ==
Name	Publisher	ISBN	Publishing date	Notes
English, August : An Indian story	Faber & Faber, Rupa & Co, NYRB Classics	Hardback: ISBN 0-571-15101-9 Paperback: ISBN 0-14-027811-7 Reprint: ISBN 1-59017-179-9	First published June 1988. Reprint by NYRB Classics 2006	Hailed as the definitive urban Indian coming-of-age novel
The Last Burden	Faber & Faber	Hardback: ISBN 0-571-16825-6	16 August 1993	
The Mammaries of the Welfare State	Viking	ISBN 0-670-87934-7	2000	Sequel to English August
Weight Loss	Penguin Books India	Paperback: ISBN 0-670-05862-9	28 February 2006	
Way to Go	Penguin Books India	Hardback: ISBN 978-0-670-08352-7	15 February 2011	Sequel to The Last Burden
Fairy Tales at Fifty	Harper Collins India	Hardback: ISBN 9789351363132	15 November 2014	
Lorenzo Searches for the Meaning of Life	Speaking Tiger	Hardback: ISBN 978-9354476211	5 February 2024	Winner, JCB Prize

== See also ==
- List of Indian writers
