= English, August =

Book by Upamanyu Chatterjee

- First edition
- Author: Upamanyu Chatterjee
- Language: English
- Publisher: Faber & Faber
- Publication date: January 1988
- Publication place: India
- Pages: 296 pp
- ISBN: 0571151019
- OCLC: 630591196
- Followed by: The Last Burden

English, August: An Indian Story is a novel by Indian author Upamanyu Chatterjee. It is written in English and first published in 1988. The novel was adapted into a film of the same name in 1994. The novel portrays the struggle of a civil servant who is posted in a rural area and is considered to be a very authentic portrayal of the state of Indian youth in the 1980s. Chatterjee, who became a civil servant in 1983, provides key insight into the disparity between rural and urban lived experiences witnessed in his generation. The key character, Agastya Sen, can also be seen in the sequel of this novel The Mammaries of the Welfare State.

== Plot summary ==
"Agastya Sen is a young Indian civil servant whose imagination is dominated by women, literature, and soft drugs."

Agastya, a city boy, initially struggles with the culture shock of being posted to the provincial town of Madna. However, his time there develops into a long philosophical journey and a process of self discovery.

Agastya Sen's sense of dislocation is only compounded by his extreme lack of interest in the bizarre ways of government and administration, while his mind is dominated by the Meditations of Marcus Aurelius and images from his previous urban life. His work in Madna would ideally require him to be a devoted servant of the people.

== Critical reception ==
Kirkus Reviews writes, "Excellent stuff. Let's have Chatterjee's other novels, please." Michael Dirda of The Washington Post writes,"Upamanyu Chatterjee himself served in the Indian Administrative Service, and clearly knows both its ways and the disconnect felt between young Indians and their past." Publishers Weekly describes the novel as "a comic, entertaining portrayal of an administrator's life in the sticks." Akash Kapur writes in The New York Times, "His book displays a world rarely seen in modern Indian writing, revealing a detailed knowledge of the heartland that can result only from personal experience."

According to the Library of Congress New Delhi Office, "This vivid account of "real India" by the young officer posted to the small provincial town of Madna is "a funny, wryly observed account of Agastya Sen's year in the sticks," as described by a reviewer in The Observer, and "A review in Punch described the book as "Beautifully written … English, August is a marvelously intelligent and entertaining novel, and especially for anyone curious about modern India."

In 2018, on the occasion of the 30-year anniversary reprinting, Supriya Nair writes for Scroll.in, "It remains to be seen if a new generation of readers laugh at the jokes. English, August was first published in a time when the Indian novel in English was the subject of knock-down-drag-out fights over which language really represented (for a given value of “really” and “represented”) India."

== See also ==
- English, August, 1994 film adaptation
