= The Mammaries of the Welfare State =

2000 book by Upamanyu Chatterjee

- First edition
- Author: Upamanyu Chatterjee
- Language: English
- Publisher: Viking Press
- Publication date: 2000
- Publication place: India
- Pages: 437 pp
- ISBN: 0-670-87934-7
- OCLC: 45845242
- Dewey Decimal: 823/.914 21
- LC Class: PR9499.3.C4665 M36 2000
- Preceded by: English, August

The Mammaries of the Welfare State is an English-language Indian novel, the sequel to Upamanyu Chatterjee's debut novel, English, August, also told from the perspective of the fictional character Agastya Sen. It won the Sahitya Akademi Award (English) in 2004. The novel tells the story of political bureaucracy in the fictional state of Madna when an epidemic breaks out. The title derives from a line of dialog in the novel, where a civil servant states "In my eight years of service, I haven't come across a single case in which everybody concerned didn't try to milk dry the boobs of the Welfare State".

== Critical reception ==
Anand Vardhan states that the novel anticipated India's initial response to the COVID-19 pandemic in its portrayal of a pandemic where civil servants are preoccupied more with "procedure and spin". Anjana Sharma, writing for The Hindu, says that it "dares to voice a moral outrage that very rarely finds its way into fiction". Various reviews praise the humour of the novel as a "hilarious satire", "funny" and "a book of laughter and disgust".

It received some criticism for its structure, focus and length. Vardhan criticizes the novel's "scattered plot and meandering narratives", while Sharma concurs that it is "a bit repetitive". The Modern Novel states that it "does drag out somewhat" and "you just want him to get on with the story. Which he doesn’t."
