= Katrina Kaif filmography =

List of films of British actress Katrina Kaif

Kaif in 2016

Katrina Kaif is a British actress who predominantly appears in Hindi films. She made her film debut in the 2003 heist film Boom, a box office bomb. She then played the titular princess in the Telugu film Malliswari (2004). Kaif had her first success in Bollywood when she appeared opposite Salman Khan in David Dhawan's romantic comedy Maine Pyaar Kyun Kiya?. The 2006 musical romance Humko Deewana Kar Gaye saw Kaif pair opposite Akshay Kumar for the first of many films, though the film was a critical and financial failure. Beginning with Namastey London, the year 2007 marked a turning point in her career when all four releases proved to be successful at the box-office. Among these were two of the highest grossing productions of the year, the comedies Partner and Welcome. following year, Kaif appeared in three films including the action comedy Singh Is Kinng.

In 2009, Kaif received a nomination for the Filmfare Award for Best Actress for her performance in Kabir Khan's terrorism drama New York. Later that year, she starred opposite Ranbir Kapoor in the comedy Ajab Prem Ki Ghazab Kahani. In 2010, Kaif portrayed the role of a politician in Prakash Jha's political thriller Raajneeti and an aspiring actress in Tees Maar Khan. While the former was a box-office hit, the latter was a critical and commercial failure. Kaif starred alongside an ensemble cast in Zoya Akhtar's comedy drama Zindagi Na Milegi Dobara (2011). She received her second Filmfare Award nomination for Best Actress for her portrayal of a runaway bride in the romantic comedy Mere Brother Ki Dulhan (2011).

In 2012, Kaif played the role of a Pakistani spy in Ek Tha Tiger, which became the highest-grossing Bollywood film of the year. The same year, she starred alongside Shah Rukh Khan and Anushka Sharma in Jab Tak Hai Jaan, a romance by Yash Chopra. Kaif played a brief role in the 2013 action film Dhoom 3. With a worldwide revenue of ₹5.42 billion (US$56 million), Dhoom 3 went on to become the highest-grossing Bollywood film of all time at the time of its release. Kaif played Hrithik Roshan's love interest in the 2014 action comedy Bang Bang!, which was followed by several commercially failed films in the next three years. Her first success in these years came with the sequel Tiger Zinda Hai (2017), which earned over ₹5.54 billion (US$58 million). In 2018, Kaif featured in two most expensive Indian films of all time—the action adventure Thugs of Hindostan and the romantic comedy Zero, both of which were commercial failures. However, her performance in the latter was critically praised, earning Kaif the award for the Zee Cine Award for Best Actor in a Supporting Role - Female and a nomination for the Filmfare Award for Best Supporting Actress. Her next releases, the period drama Bharat (2019), the action films Sooryavanshi (2021) and Tiger 3 (2023) were all commercially successful.

== Highest grossing films ==
Rank	Movie	Release Year	Worldwide Gross (approx.)	Ref.
1	Tiger Zinda Hai	2017	₹565 Crore	
2	Dhoom 3	2013	₹556 Crore	
3	Tiger 3	2023	₹466 Crore	
4	Bang Bang!	2014	₹340 Crore	
5	Thugs of Hindostan	2018	₹328 Crore	
6	Bharat	2019	₹325 Crore	
7	Ek Tha Tiger	2012	₹320 Crore	
8	Sooryavanshi	2021	₹295 Crore	
9	Jab Tak Hai Jaan	2012	₹235 Crore	
10	Zero	2018	₹186 Crore	
11	Zindagi Na Milegi Dobara	2011	₹153 Crore	
12	Raajneeti	2010	₹145 Crore	
13	Singh Is Kinng	2008	₹125 Crore	
14	Welcome	2007	₹122 Crore	
15	Mere Brother Ki Dulhan	2011	₹118 Crore	
16	Race	2008	₹106 Crore	
17	Partner	2007	₹100 Crore	
18	Tees Maar Khan	2010	₹99 Crore	
19	Ajab Prem Ki Ghazab Kahani	2009	₹87 Crore	
20	Jagga Jasoos	2017	₹83 Crore	
21	Merry Christmas	2024	₹26 Crore	
22	Phone Bhoot	2022	₹14 Crore	
23	Phantom	2015	₹58 Crore	
24	Fitoor	2016	₹31 Crore	
25	Baar Baar Dekho	2016	₹31 Crore	
26	De Dana Dan	2009	₹61 Crore	
27	New York	2009	₹63 Crore	
28	Namastey London	2007	₹71 Crore	
29	Apne	2007	₹36 Crore	
30	Hum Ko Deewana Kar Gaye	2006	₹18 Crore	
31	Sarkar	2005	₹36 Crore	
32	Maine Pyaar Kyun Kiya?	2005	₹48 Crore	
33	Boom	2003	₹2 Crore	

== Films ==
- All films are in Hindi, unless otherwise noted.

Year	Title	Role	Notes	Ref.
2003	Boom	Rina Kaif		
2004	Malliswari	Malliswari	Telugu film	
2005	Sarkar	Pooja Chauhan		
2005	Maine Pyaar Kyun Kiya?	Sonia Bhardwaj		
2005	Allari Pidugu	Swathi	Telugu film	
2006	Humko Deewana Kar Gaye	Jia A. Yashvardhan		
2006	Balram vs. Tharadas	Supriya Menon	Malayalam film	
2007	Namastey London	Jasmeet "Jazz" Malhotra		
2007	Apne	Nandini Sarabhai		
2007	Partner	Priya R. Jaisingh		
2007	Welcome	Sanjana S. Shetty		
2008	Race	Sophia Sharma		
2008	Singh Is Kinng	Sonia Singh		
2008	Hello	Angel	Cameo appearance	
2008	Yuvvraaj	Anushka "Anu" Banton		
2009	New York	Maya Sheikh		
2009	Blue	Nikita "Nikki" Malhotra	Cameo appearance	
2009	Ajab Prem Ki Ghazab Kahani	Jennifer "Jenny" Pinto		
2009	De Dana Dan	Anjali Kakkar		
2010	Raajneeti	Indu Pratap		
2010	Tees Maar Khan	Aanya Khan		
2011	Zindagi Na Milegi Dobara	Laila		
2011	Bodyguard	Herself	Special appearance in the song "Bodyguard"	
2011	Mere Brother Ki Dulhan	Dimple Dixit		
2012	Agneepath	Unnamed	Special appearance in the song "Chikni Chameli"	
2012	Ek Tha Tiger	Zoya		
2012	Jab Tak Hai Jaan	Meera Thapar		
2013	Main Krishna Hoon	Herself	Cameo appearance	
2013	Bombay Talkies	Herself	Special appearance in the segment "Sheila Ki Jawani"	
2013	Dhoom 3	Aaliya Hussain		
2014	Bang Bang!	Harleen Sahni		
2015	Phantom	Nawaz Mistry		
2016	Fitoor	Firdaus Jahaan Naqvi		
2016	Baar Baar Dekho	Diya Kapoor		
2017	Jagga Jasoos	Shruti Sengupta		
2017	Tiger Zinda Hai	Zoya		
2018	Welcome to New York	Herself	Cameo appearance	
2018	Thugs of Hindostan	Suraiyya		
2018	Zero	Babita Kumari		
2019	Bharat	Kumud Raina		
2021	Sooryavanshi	Dr. Ria Gupta		
2022	Phone Bhoot	Ragini Maheshwari		
2023	Tiger 3	Zoya		
2024	Merry Christmas	Maria	Simultaneously shot in Tamil	

== Music videos ==
Year	Title	Singer(s)	Composer	Notes	Ref.
2011	"Let's Party"	Ganesh Hegde	Ganesh Hegde		
2020	"Kudi Nu Nachne De"	Vishal Dadlani, Sachin–Jigar	Sachin–Jigar, Tanishk Bagchi	Promotional song for Angrezi Medium	

== See also ==
- List of awards and nominations received by Katrina Kaif
