= List of awards and nominations received by Katrina Kaif =

Katrina Kaif awards and nominations
- Kaif at Filmfare Style Awards in 2016
Awards and nominations
Award	Wins	Nominations
BIG Star Entertainment Awards	2	7
Filmfare Awards	0	3
Screen Awards	4	10
Zee Cine Awards	4	9
Stardust Awards	4	15
Star Guild Awards	2	4
IIFA Awards	1	5
Filmfare Awards South	0	1
ETC Bollywood Business Awards	2	2
Lions Gold Awards	1	1
People's Choice Awards India	1	1
NDTV Indian of the Year	1	1
Others	14	N/A

Totals (Note: Certain award groups do not simply award one winner. They acknowledge several different recipients, have runners-up, and have third place. Since this is a specific recognition and is different from losing an award, runner-up mentions are considered wins in this award tally. For simplification and to avoid errors, each award in this list has been presumed to have had a prior nomination.)
- Wins: 36
- Nominations: 68

Katrina Kaif is a British actress who predominantly works in the Bollywood film industry. Kaif is the recipient of over 20 accolades including Stardust Awards, Zee Cine Awards, Screen Awards, IIFA Awards and 3 Filmfare Award nominations into her credit. Kaif has also topped various listings of India's most attractive people, being named "World's Sexiest Woman" by FHM 5 times, Eastern Eye's "Sexiest Asian Woman" 4 times, The Times of India's "Most Desirable Woman" in 2010 and People's "Most Beautiful Woman" (India) in 2011.

Kaif's feature film debut was in Kaizad Gustad's box office flop Boom (2003), after which Kaif was written off due to her poor Hindi and thick British accent. She then starred as the titular character in the successful Telugu film Malliswari. After a small role in Sarkar (2005), Kaif found commercial success in Bollywood with the romantic comedy Maine Pyaar Kyun Kiya? (2005), in which Kaif received her first acting award — the Stardust Award for Breakthrough Performance – Female; this proved to be her breakthrough in Hindi cinema. In 2007, Kaif received critical praise for her performance in Namastey London (2007). This was followed by a string of box office hits in which Kaif was often cast in glamorous roles. In 2009, Kaif appeared in the drama thriller New York, earning her first nomination for the Filmfare Award for Best Actress. The same year, she appeared in the romantic comedy Ajab Prem Ki Ghazab Kahani. Both films earned her the Entertainer of the Year Award at Screen and the Best Actress - Popular Award at Stardust.

In 2010, Kaif featured in Raajneeti and Tees Maar Khan, receiving the Screen Award for Best Actress (Popular Choice) for both of them. In 2011, Kaif's performance as a free-spirited bride in Mere Brother Ki Dulhan earned her a second Filmfare nomination in the Best Actress category. She also received her second Screen Award for Best Actress (Popular Choice) for her roles in Jab Tak Hai Jaan (2012) and Ek Tha Tiger (2012). Her films Ek Tha Tiger, its 2017 sequel Tiger Zinda Hai, and Dhoom 3 (2013) rank among the highest-grossing Bollywood films of all time. Her roles in Zero (2018) and the commercially successful drama Bharat (2019) garnered her widespread critical praise; her portrayal of an alcoholic actress Babita Kumari in the former is one of the most acclaimed of her career, earning her a Zee Cine Award for Best Actor in a Supporting Role – Female and a third Filmfare Award nomination in the same category. Katrina Kaif has also been awarded the Smita Patil Memorial Award in 2016 - for her contribution to Indian Cinema.

== BIG Star Entertainment Awards ==
Year	Nominated work	Category	Result	Ref.
2010	Raajneeti	Most Entertaining Actor (Film) - Female	Nominated	
2010	—N/a	New Talent of the Decade	Nominated	
2012	Ek Tha Tiger	Most Entertaining Actor in an Action Thriller Film - Female	Nominated	
2012	Jab Tak Hai Jaan	Most Entertaining Actor in a Romantic Film - Female	Won	
2012	Jab Tak Hai Jaan	Best On-Screen Jodi (shared with Shah Rukh Khan)	Won	
2014	Dhoom 3	Most Entertaining Dancer	Nominated	
2014	Bang Bang!	Most Entertaining Actor in a Romantic Film - Female	Nominated	

== International Indian Film Academy Awards ==
Year	Nominated work	Category	Result	Ref.
2008	—N/a	Style Diva of the Year	Won	
2008	Namastey London	Best Actress	Nominated	
2009	Singh Is Kinng	Best Actress	Nominated	
2011	Raajneeti	Best Actress	Nominated	
2025	Merry Christmas	Best Actress	Nominated	

== Filmfare Awards ==
Year	Nominated work	Category	Result	Ref.
2010	New York	Best Actress	Nominated	
2012	Mere Brother Ki Dulhan	Best Actress	Nominated	
2019	Zero	Best Supporting Actress	Nominated	

== Screen Awards ==
Year	Nominated work	Category	Result	Ref.
2010	—N/a	Entertainer of the Year	Won	
2010	New York	Best Actress	Nominated	
2010	New York	Best Actress (Popular Choice)	Nominated	
2010	Ajab Prem Ki Ghazab Kahani	Best Actress (Popular Choice)	Nominated	
2011	Raajneeti & Tees Maar Khan	Best Actress (Popular Choice)	Won	
2013	Ek Tha Tiger & Jab Tak Hai Jaan	Best Actress (Popular Choice)	Won	
2014	Dhoom 3	Best Actress (Popular Choice)	Nominated	
2015	Bang Bang!	Best Actress (Popular Choice)	Nominated	
2018	—N/a	Best Real Star On Social Media	Won	
2019	Bharat	Best Actress	Nominated	

== Star Guild Awards ==
Year	Nominated work	Category	Result	Ref.
2008	—N/a	Style Icon of the Year	Won	
2009	Race	Best Actress in a Supporting Role	Nominated	
2011	—N/a	Hindustan Times Reader's Choice Entertainer Of The Year Award	Won	
2012	Mere Brother Ki Dulhan	Best Actress in a Leading Role	Nominated	

== Stardust Awards ==
Year	Nominated work	Category	Result	Ref.
2006	Maine Pyaar Kyun Kiya?	Breakthrough Performance – Female	Won	
2007	Humko Deewana Kar Gaye	Superstar of Tomorrow – Female	Nominated	
2009	Race	Best Actress In A Negative Role	Nominated	
2009	Singh Is Kinng	Star of the Year – Female	Nominated	
2010	New York & Ajab Prem Ki Ghazab Kahani	Best Actress - Popular	Won	
2010	Ajab Prem Ki Ghazab Kahani	Star of the Year – Female	Won	
2011	Raajneeti & Tees Maar Khan	Star of the Year – Female	Nominated	
2011	Raajneeti	Best Actress in a Drama	Nominated	
2011	Tees Maar Khan	Best Actress in a Comedy or Romance	Won	
2012	Mere Brother Ki Dulhan & Zindagi Na Milegi Dobara	Star of the Year – Female	Nominated	
2012	Mere Brother Ki Dulhan	Best Actress in a Comedy or Romance	Nominated	
2012	Zindagi Na Milegi Dobara	Best Actress in a Drama	Nominated	
2013	Ek Tha Tiger & Jab Tak Hai Jaan	Star of the Year – Female	Nominated	
2013	Ek Tha Tiger	Best Actress in a Thriller or Action	Nominated	
2013	Jab Tak Hai Jaan	Best Actress in a Comedy or Romance	Nominated	

== Zee Cine Awards ==
Year	Nominated work	Category	Result	Ref.
2006	Sarkar	Best Female Debut	Nominated	
2007	Namastey London	Best Actor – Female	Nominated	
2008	—N/a	British Indian Actor Award	Won	
2011	Raajneeti	Best Actor – Female	Nominated	
2012	—N/a	International Icon Female Award	Won	
2012	Zindagi Na Milegi Dobara	Best Actor – Female	Nominated	
2013	—N/a	International Icon Female Award	Won	
2019	Zero	Best Actor in a Supporting Role – Female	Won	
2025	Merry Christmas	Best Actor – Female	Nominated	
2025	Merry Christmas	Best Actress Viewers' Choice	Nominated	

== ETC Bollywood Business Awards ==
Year	Nominated work	Category	Result	Ref.
2013	Ek Tha Tiger & Jab Tak Hai Jaan	Most Profitable Actress	Won	
2011	Raajneeti & Tees Maar Khan	Most Profitable Actress	Won	

== NDTV Indian of the Year ==
Year	Nominated work	Category	Result	Ref.
2011	Zindagi Na Milegi Dobara	Entertainer of the Year	Won	

== Other awards and recognition ==
Year	Award	Nominated work	Category	Result.	Ref.
2013	People's Choice Awards India	Ek Tha Tiger	Favorite Movie Actress	Won	
2011	Lions Gold Awards	Rajneeti	Best Actress	Won	
2023	Bollywood Hungama Style Icons	—N/a	Most Stylish Actor (Female)	Nominated	
2023	Bollywood Hungama Style Icons	—N/a	Most Stylish Entrepreneur	Nominated	
