= Marc Robinson =

Indian model (born 1964)

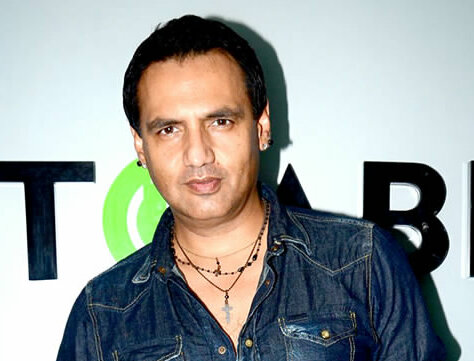
- Robinson in 2014
- Occupations: Actor, supermodel, beauty pageant/event director and grooming expert
- Spouse: Waluscha de Sousa (m. 2002; div. 2013)
- Children: 3

Marc Robinson is an Indian actor and former model. Robinson initiated his career in the fashion, entertainment and media industry and later moved on as a television presenter for Channel V. As an actor he has played the male lead roles in Bada Din (1998), opposite Shabana Azmi and Tara Deshpande.

== Early life and education ==
Robinson was born into an Indian Christian family, regularly attending Sunday mass while growing up, and did his Master's from the Delhi School of Economics during the late 1980s.

== Career ==
Robinson is the founder and fashion director of Dubai Fashion Week. Robinson has worked as a fashion and show director at Lakme Fashion Week. He has been also the National Director for the Femina Miss India beauty pageant as well as the contestant and show director for Ford Models Supermodel of the World, the Indian chapter. In addition to this he is the creative and fashion director for the BMW India Bridal Fashion Week.

Robinson is the organizer and licensee for Elite Model Look India. Robinson is the Project Head for Max Design Awards Student Edition, Max Emerging Star, and Max Fashion Icon India.

Robinson also participated in the first and only season of the reality show Iss Jungle Se Mujhe Bachao in 2009.

Robinson is a diehard Manchester United supporter. He is also an avid sportsman and currently plays soccer for the All Stars Football Club in Mumbai.

== Personal life ==
Robinson married Waluscha de Sousa in Goa in 2002; the couple have three children, Chanel, Brooklyn, and Sienna. The couple separated in 2013. He is currently residing in Mumbai.

== Career ==
Film and television appearances

- Lover Girl (Album: Made in India) (1995)) (Music video)
- Bada Din (1998) (Feature film)
- Iss Jungle Se Mujhe Bachao (2014) (Reality television)
