= Alexander Gifford =

British actor and theatre director

Alexander Gifford is an English theatre director and former model and film actor. He was one of the three leads in Kaizad Gustad's cult comedy Bombay Boys (1998) alongside Naveen Andrews and Rahul Bose. He played the role of Xerxes Mistry, a confused young British Asian of Parsi origin who comes to Bombay in search of his artistic and sexual identity. This was Gifford's only film. He had also worked as a model.

In later years, Gifford has been actively involved in youth theatre, especially in the Gloucestershire area, running the Gloucester Theatre Company. In 2009, he was appointed joint managing director of the Picturedrome Theatre (formerly the New Olympus) in Gloucester.

== Filmography ==
- Bombay Boys (1998) as Xerxes Mistry
