= Indian Pro Music League =

Indian singing reality show

- Genre: Reality
- Created by: Fathom Pictures
- Developed by: Zee Studios Television
- Presented by: Karan Wahi; Waluscha De Sousa
- Starring: ShaanNeha Bhasin
- Theme music composer: Sajid–Wajid
- Opening theme: IPML Opening Theme
- Ending theme: IPML End Theme
- Composer: Sajid–Wajid
- Country of origin: India
- Original language: Hindi
- No. of seasons: 1
- No. of episodes: 26

Production
- Production locations: Mumbai, Maharashtra, India
- Camera setup: Multi-camera
- Running time: 60 Minutes
- Production companies: Zee Studios Television; Contiloe Entertainment Television; Fathom Pictures

Original release
- Network: Zee TV
- Release: 26 February – 18 July 2021

Indian Pro Music League or IPML is the world's first Music League based in India that premiered on 26 February 2021 on Zee TV and concluded on 18 July 2021. The first season was hosted by Karan Wahi and Waluscha De Sousa.

== Format ==
This show has a "league" format similar to a sports league, where a number of teams, representing different regions of India, compete with each other.

The first season of the show had six teams: Mumbai Warriors, Punjab Lions, Bengal Tigers, Gujarat Rockers, UP Dabbangs and Delhi Jammers. Each team consisted of five people, including playback singers and reality show participants.

Various Bollywood and sports celebrities sponsored the teams, with Salman Khan being the brand ambassador.

== Teams ==
The six teams in the first season of the show were Mumbai Warriors, Punjab Lions, Bengal Tigers, Gujarat Rockers, UP Dabbangs and Delhi Jammers.

Here is a list of the teams and their members, who are all singers and music composers of Indian Cinema.

Indian pro music league

- Brand ambassador Salman Khan

1) WeSafe India Punjab Lions: Mika Singh, Asees Kaur, Divya Kumar, Shehnaz Akhtar and Rupali Jagga. (Winner)

- Brand ambassador bobby Deol

2) Nilkamal Mattrezzz Mumbai Warriors: Kailash Kher, Mohammed Irfan, Rachit Agrawal, Shilpa Rao, and Purva Mantri.(1st runner-up)

- Brand ambassador Ritesh Deshmukh & Genelia

3) Ananya Birla Foundation Bengal Tigers: Shaan, Akriti Kakar, Nikhita Gandhi, Rituraj Mohanty and Mismi Bose( 2nd runner-up)

- Brand ambassador Govinda

4) Divya Bhaskar Gujarat Rockers: Javed Ali, Bhoomi Trivedi, Aditi Singh Sharma, Laj and Hemant Brijwasi.(3rd runner-up)

- Brand ambassador Rajkumar Rao

5) Eduauraa UP Dabbangs: Ankit Tiwari, Payal Dev, Amit Gupta, Rupam Bharnarhia and Salman Ali.(Eliminated)

- Brand ambassador Suresh Raina

6) Smule Delhi Jammers: Sajid Khan, Neha Bhasin, Shabab Sabri, Ankush Bhardwaj and Priyanshi Shrivastava(Eliminated)

- Brand ambassador Shakti Kapoor & Shraddha Kapoor

== Team Status ==
Teams	Place	Status
Punjab Lions	1st	Winner
Mumbai Warriors	2nd	Runner-up
Bengal Tigers	3rd	2nd Runner-up
Gujarat Rockers	4th	3rd Runner-up
UP Dabbangs	5th	Eliminated
Delhi Jamners	6th	Eliminated

== Marketing ==
The show approached big brands for sponsorship such as Maruti Suzuki, Lifebuoy, LIC of India, Nilkamal Mattrezzzz and many more to increase popularity across the globe.

== COVID-19 outbreak ==
The shooting of the show had been halted in May 2021 due to lockdown in Maharastra.

According to Pinkvilla, due to coronavirus outbreak, the makers had decided to conclude its final episode just after fourth innings whenever they got the permission to shoot episodes, which was initially planned for five League Matches.
