= Bombay Boys =

- Directed by: Kaizad Gustad
- Written by: Kaizad Gustad
- Starring: Tara Deshpande; Naveen Andrews; Rahul Bose; Alexander Gifford; Naseeruddin Shah; Roshan Seth; Luke Kenny
- Cinematography: Kramer Morgenthau
- Edited by: Priya Krishnaswamy
- Music by: Dhruv Ghanekar; Ashutosh Phatak
- Release date: 25 December 1998
- Running time: 105 min.
- Country: India
- Language: English

Bombay Boys is a 1998 Indian crime comedy film written and directed by the Indian director Kaizad Gustad. It follows the adventures of three young men in modern-day Mumbai (or Bombay). The boys are of Indian origin, but were all raised in the West. Krishna Sahni (played by Naveen Andrews) is an aspiring actor from New York City who wants to make it big in Bollywood. Ricardo Fernandes (Rahul Bose) is from Sydney and is in Mumbai to search for his long-lost brother. Finally, Xerxes Mistry (Alexander Gifford), a musician from London, is looking to discover his "roots" in the land of his ancestors.

== Synopsis ==
The three meet for the first time at Mumbai's airport and decide to find a place together. In the course of the movie, Krishna finds out that, in order to break into the local film industry, he must first win the (decidedly risky) patronage of Don Mastana, a godfather of the Mumbai underworld who's also a film producer. Mastana is a violent man who thinks nothing of impaling a lizard with a knife or shattering the skull of a fellow crime boss for making a pass at his girlfriend.

Ricardo, the serious-looking Australian, finds out the sad fate of his brother, but also manages to fall in love with Mastana's spunky moll Dolly, igniting further flames. Xerxes, who's a Parsi, is led to embrace his latent homosexuality by their gay landlord.

== Cast ==
- Naveen Andrews as Krishna Sahni
- Rahul Bose,as Ricardo Fernandes
- Alexander Gifford as Xerxes Mistry
- Naseeruddin Shah as Don Mastana
- Tara Deshpande as Dolly
- Roshan Seth as Pesi
- Tarun Shahani as Danny
- Luke Kenny as Xavier
- Vinay Pathak as Spot-boy turned director
- Kushal Punjabi as Asif
- Nagesh Bhosle - Cherry Blossom Kalia

Additionally, Javed Jaffrey made a special appearance in the item number "Mumbhai."

== Production ==
Bombay Boys, which took four years to complete, was filmed on location in Mumbai's bars, slums and markets. The film was made on a limited budget; director Kaizad Gustad financed the film with credit cards as well as by borrowing money from his family and friends.

== Soundtrack ==
The music was composed by Ashutosh Phatak, Dhruv Ghanekar and released by Sony Music India.

Bombay Boys

Soundtrack album by Ashutosh Phatak, Dhruv Ghanekar
- Released: 12 August 1998
- Recorded: 1995–1998
- Genre: Soundtrack
- Length: 40:12
- Label: Sony Music India
- Producers: Ashutosh Phatak, Dhruv Ghanekar

Ashutosh Phatak, Dhruv Ghanekar chronology
Tamanna (1997)	Bombay Boys (1998)	Snip! (2000)

Track list
No.	Title	Singer(s)	Length
1.	"Mumbhai"	Ashutosh Phatak, Dhruv Ghanekar, Javed Jaffrey	5:06
2.	"Paisa Paisa Paisa"	Ashutosh Phatak, Dhruv Ghanekar, Mehnaz	6:11
3.	"Sunoh"	Lucky Ali	5:02
4.	"Mastana's Theme"	Ashutosh Phatak, Dhruv Ghanekar, Smoke, Naseeruddin Shah	5:04
5.	"Yeah Yeah"	Ashutosh Phatak, Dhruv Ghanekar, Indus Creed	3:04
6.	"Tabla Dholak"	Ashutosh Phatak, Dhruv Ghanekar, Vinay Mandke	1:56
7.	"Quest"	Ashutosh Phatak, Dhruv Ghanekar, Anaida	6:22
8.	"Bombay Blues"	Ashutosh Phatak, Dhruv Ghanekar, Bashir Sheikh	5:01
9.	"Waltzing Matunga"	Merlyn D'Souza, Asif Ali Beg, Mantra	2:26
10.	"Oye Shaava"	Raageshwari	4:50
Total length:			40:12

== Critical reception ==
Pradeep Sebastian of Deccan Herald wrote that "Going by the crowds flocking to see it, it[']s clear that Indian audiences have begun to expect good things from Indian English films. But this is one they are going to be disappointed with."
