= Waluscha De Sousa =

Indian actress, model & television presenter (born 1979)

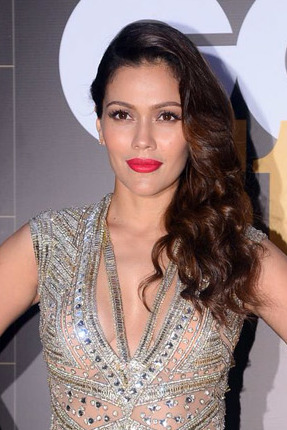
- De Sousa graces in GQ Style Awards 2018
- Born: Waluscha De Sousa; 28 November 1981 (age 44); Goa, India
- Occupations: Actress; model
- Years active: 2000–present
- Spouse: Marc Robinson (m. 2002; div. 2013)
- Children: 3

Waluscha De Sousa (born 28 November 1981) is an Indian actress and model. She made her debut in the 2016 Hindi film Fan, in which she starred alongside Shah Rukh Khan.

== Early life and education ==
Waluscha De Sousa hails from Goa and is of paternal Portuguese and maternal German descent. She was discovered by fashion designer Wendell Rodricks at the age of 16.

Waluscha lived by the beach and was an athlete in her growing years. She enjoys outdoor adventures. She studied at 'Our Lady of the Rosary' at Dona Paula in Panjim and later completed her education at St. Xavier's College, Mapusa.

== Career ==
Waluscha modeled for leading designers in the country and subsequently took part in the Miss India pageant, where she secured herself the "Miss Body Beautiful" title. She did her first TV commercial for Pepsi with Shah Rukh Khan at the age of 17. Years later, she once again featured in a Hyundai commercial with the actor. She has also been the face of brands including Jaipur Jewels, L'Oreal, Avon Haircare naturals, Falguni and Shane's new Peacock collection 2016.

In 2016 Waluscha made her debut with Shahrukh Khan's film Fan.

== Personal life ==
She was married to Marc Robinson in Goa. The couple have three children, Chanel Robinson, Brooklyn Robinson and Sienna Robinson. The couple filed for a divorce in 2013.

== Magazine covers ==
- FHM (India)
- Verve
- Harper’s Bazaar
- Bollywood FilmFame Cover
- Travel + Leisure Magazine (India)
- Viva Goa
- Femina Salon and Spa
- Smartlife
- Elle beauty
- GQ India
- Vogue beauty editorial
- Cine Blitz
- Man's World

== Filmography ==
Key
| † | Denotes films that have not yet been released |

| Year | Movie | Role | Language | Notes |
|---|---|---|---|---|
| 2016 | Fan | Bela Khanna | Hindi | Debut film |
| 2019 | Lucifer | Dancer | Malayalam | Item number "Raftaara" |
| 2020 | Crackdown | Garima Kalra, Zorawar's wife/Mausam Masoud, ISI Agent | Hindi | Web series released on Voot |
| 2021 | Time to Dance | Meher | Hindi | |
| 2021 | Antim: The Final Truth | Chingari | Hindi | |
| 2022 | Escaype Live | Gia Bose | Hindi | Web series on Disney+ Hotstar |
| 2022 | Tanaav | Zainab Riaz | Hindi | SonyLIV |
| 2024 | Karmma Calling | Dolly Bhatia | Hindi | Web series released on Disney+ Hotstar |
| 2024 | Crackdown 2 | Garima Kalra | Hindi | Web series released on OTT |
| 2026 | Everybody Loves Sohrab Handa | Naina | Hindi | |

=== Television ===
| Year | Show | Note(s) |
|---|---|---|
| 2019 | Nach Baliye 9 | Host |
| 2021 | Indian Pro Music League | Host |
| 2021 | Bigg Boss 15 | Guest |
