= Everybody Loves Sohrab Handa =

- Directed by: Rajat Kapoor
- Written by: Rajat Kapoor
- Produced by: Sameer Nair; Deepak Segal; Rajat Kapoor
- Starring: Vinay Pathak; Ranvir Shorey; Waluscha De Sousa; Saurabh Shukla; Koel Purie; Sadia Siddiqui; Chandrachoor Rai
- Cinematography: Rafey Mahmood
- Production companies: Applause Entertainment; Mithya Talkies
- Distributed by: ZEE5
- Release dates: October 2023 (MAMI); 10 April 2026
- Running time: 108 minutes
- Country: India
- Language: Hindi

Everybody Loves Sohrab Handa is a 2023 Indian Hindi-language mystery film written and directed by Rajat Kapoor. The film features an ensemble cast including Vinay Pathak, Ranvir Shorey, Waluscha De Sousa, Saurabh Shukla, Koel Purie, Sadia Siddiqui, and Chandrachoor Rai. Produced by Applause Entertainment in association with Mithya Talkies, the film premiered on ZEE5 on 10 April 2026.

== Plot ==
Raman and Jayanti host an outstation party at a secluded mansion in Himachal Pradesh to celebrate their 10th wedding anniversary. Among the guests is Raman's business partner, Sohrab Handa, an abrasive and foul-mouthed man who spends the evening insulting and belittling the other attendees.

Following a session of heavy drinking and parlor games, Handa is found dead in the early hours of the morning with his throat slit. Local police inspector Afzal Qureshi arrives to conduct the investigation, and the celebratory atmosphere quickly dissolves into mutual suspicion. As Qureshi interrogates the guests, it becomes evident that every person present had a significant motive to kill Handa, exposing deep-seated resentments and hidden secrets within the group.

== Cast ==
- Vinay Pathak as Sohrab Handa
- Ranvir Shorey as Madhavan
- Waluscha De Sousa as Naina
- Saurabh Shukla as Inspector Afzal Qureshi
- Koel Purie as Isha Handa
- Sadiya Siddiqui as Suman
- Neil Bhoopalam as Raman Chawla
- Chandrachoor Rai as Arun
- Palomi Ghosh as Jayanti Chawla
- Rajat Kapoor as Chandra
- Sharat Katariya as Sandeep
- M. K. Raina as Baba, Sohrab Handa's father
- Kankana Chakraborty as Nazia
- Danish Husain as Kumar

== Production ==
The film features director Rajat Kapoor's recurring collaborators, including cinematographer Rafey Mahmood and editor Suresh Pai. It was produced by Sameer Nair and Deepak Segal of Applause Entertainment. To maintain a claustrophobic setting, the film was shot primarily in a single location.

== Reception ==
On the review aggregator website Rotten Tomatoes, 92% of 12 critics' reviews are positive, with an average rating of 6.5/10.

Rahul Desai of The Hollywood Reporter India writes that "Rajat Kapoor continues his alt-mainstream career with a perfectly pitched murder mystery that unfolds in a cabin full of guilty characters." Deepa Gahlot writing for the Scroll.in describes that "Everybody Loves Sohrab Handa must feel like a palate cleanser between heavy courses. Not that it’s easy to mount a murder mystery, get a bunch of disparate characters together and work out their connections, problems and hidden agendas." Anuj Kumar of The Hindu said that the film didn't "reinvent the whodunit, but it humanises it, turning a murder mystery into a mirror held up to the insidious violence we inflict on the people we claim to love." BH Harsh of The New Indian Express gave 3.5 stars out of 5 and observed that "Chaotic conversations and great casting are the strengths of this Rajat Kapoor directorial."

Devesh Sharma of Filmfare rated it 3.5/5 stars and said that "Everybody Loves Sohrab Handa is a single-setting murder mystery which focuses more on the fragile nature of relationships than the actual murder." Ronak Kotecha of The Times of India gave 3 stars out of 5 and writes that "A classic whodunit setup, writer-director Rajat Kapoor’s Everybody Loves Sohrab Handa thrives more on messy relationships than pure suspense." Shweta Keshri of India Today gave 2.5 stars out of 5 and describes it as a slow-burn murder mystery that offers strong performances but struggles with pacing and suspense. Bollywood Hungama rated it 3/5 stars and said that "the film is a decent whodunit that stands out from the other films in this genre due to its writing, drama, and Vinay Pathak’s outstanding performance. However, the underwhelming climax plays spoilsport."
