= Katrina Kaif =

British actress and businesswoman (born 1983)

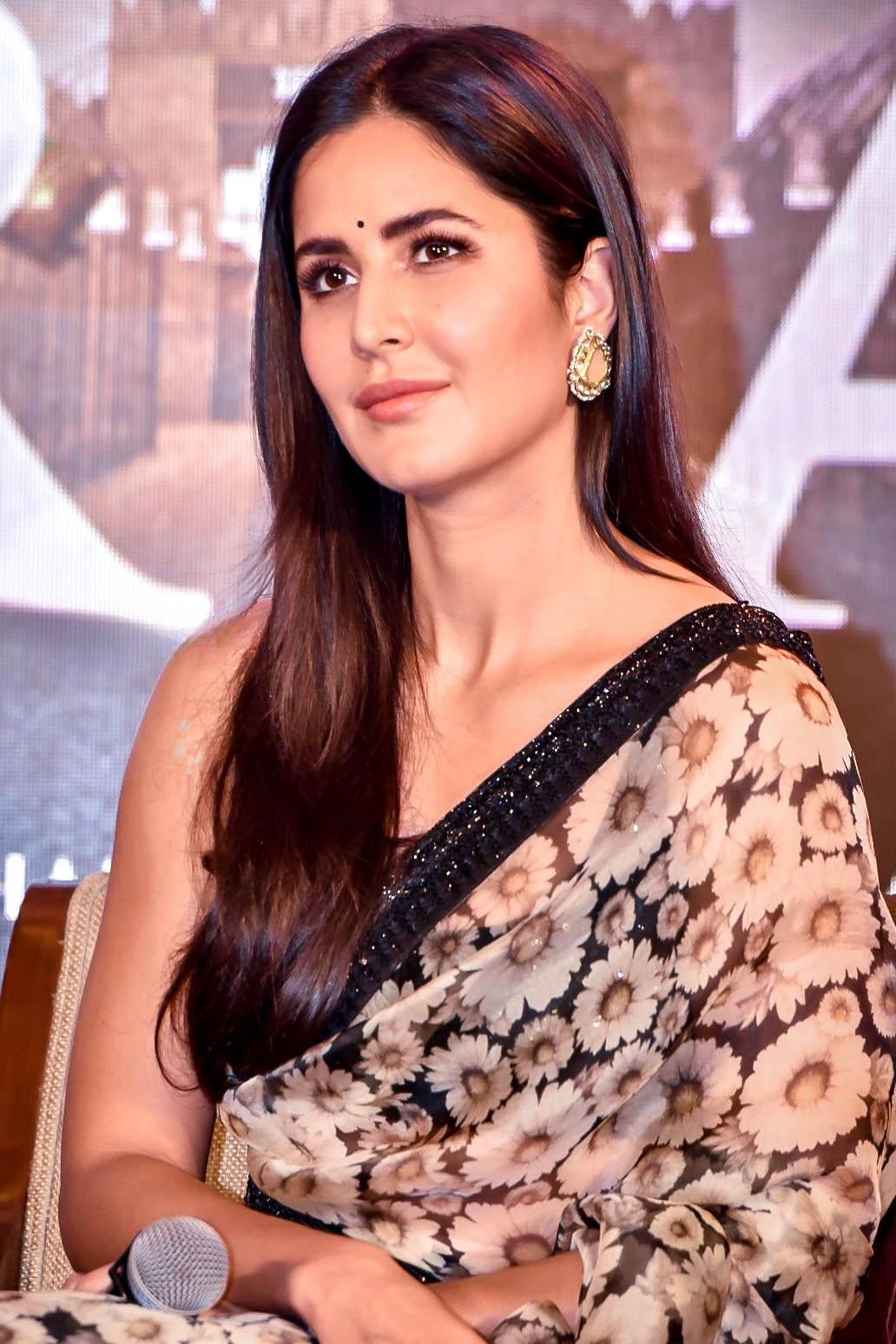
- Kaif in 2019
- Born: Katrina Rosemary Turcotte; 16 July 1983 (age 43); British Hong Kong
- Citizenship: United Kingdom
- Occupations: Actress; Businesswoman
- Years active: 2003–present
- Works: Full list
- Spouse: Vicky Kaushal (m. 2021)
- Children: 1
- Awards: Full list

Katrina Kaif (pronounced [kəˈʈriːna kɛːf]; born Katrina Rosemary Turcotte, 16 July 1983) is a British actress and businesswoman who works in Hindi-language films. One of India's highest-paid actresses, her accolades include four Screen Awards and four Zee Cine Awards, alongside three Filmfare Awards nominations. Although critical reception to her acting has varied, she is noted for her roles in action films and her dancing ability.

Born in British Hong Kong, Kaif lived in several countries before moving to London, where she spent three years. She received her first modelling assignment as a teenager and later pursued a career in fashion modelling. At a fashion show in London, Indian filmmaker Kaizad Gustad cast her in Boom (2003), which was a critical and commercial failure. While Kaif established a successful modelling career in India, she initially faced difficulty securing film roles due to her limited command of Hindi. After appearing in the Telugu film Malliswari (2004), Kaif achieved commercial success in Bollywood with the romantic comedies Maine Pyaar Kyun Kiya? (2005) and Namastey London (2007). Further success followed with a series of box-office hits, though she was criticised for her acting, repetitive roles, and preference for male-dominated films.

Kaif's performances in the thriller New York (2009) and the romantic comedy Mere Brother Ki Dulhan (2011) were better received, earning her nominations for the Filmfare Award for Best Actress. Her career progressed with roles in Ajab Prem Ki Ghazab Kahani (2009), Raajneeti (2010), and Zindagi Na Milegi Dobara (2011). She found major commercial success in the action thrillers Ek Tha Tiger (2012), Dhoom 3 (2013), and Bang Bang! (2014), which ranked among the highest-grossing Indian films of that decade. Following a brief setback, the action films Tiger Zinda Hai (2017), Sooryavanshi (2021), and Tiger 3 (2023), along with the drama Bharat (2019), emerged as box-office hits. Kaif's portrayal of an alcoholic actress in the romantic drama Zero (2018) earned her the Zee Cine Award for Best Supporting Actress and her performance in the mystery thriller Merry Christmas (2024) was well received.

In the media, Kaif frequently appears in listings of India’s most popular and attractive celebrities. Kaif was featured consistently in Forbes India's Celebrity 100 list consistently in the 2010s. A regular brand endorser, she launched her cosmetic line Kay Beauty in 2019. She participates in stage shows and is involved with her mother’s charity, Relief Projects India, which helps underprivileged children. Kaif is married to actor Vicky Kaushal, with whom she has a son.

== Early life and family ==
Kaif was born Katrina Turcotte (also spelt Turquotte, her mother's surname) in British Hong Kong on 16 July 1983. Her mother, Suzanne (also spelt Susanna), is an English lawyer and charity worker. Her father, Mohammad Kaif, is of Kashmiri descent. She said her father is a businessman in the United States, who is not in touch with them. She said he had no influence on her or her siblings while they were growing up, and that they were raised by their mother. She has seven siblings; three older sisters and three younger sisters and one elder brother. Kaif's parents divorced when she was a child, and as her mother is a social activist, the family relocated to a number of countries for varying lengths of time. Therefore, Kaif and her siblings were home-schooled by a series of tutors. She said:

Our transitions in growing up were—from Hong Kong where I was born, to China, then to Japan, and from Japan by boat to France ... After France, Switzerland—and I'm cutting out many East European countries where we were for only a few months each—then Poland in Kraków ... After that we went to Belgium, then to Hawaii, which was a short time, and then came to London.

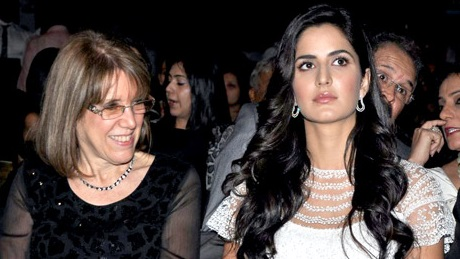
Kaif with her mother at the People's Choice Awards India, 2012

Kaif's paternal parentage has been questioned by some members of the film industry. In a 2011 interview with Mumbai Mirror, Boom producer Ayesha Shroff accused Kaif of fabricating her history: "We created an identity for her. She was this pretty young English girl, and we gave her the Kashmiri father and thought of calling her Katrina Kazi. We thought we'd give her some kind of Indian ancestry, to connect with the audience ... But then we thought that Kazi sounded too... religious? ... Mohammad Kaif was at the top, and so we said, Katrina Kaif sounds really great." Kaif denied this, calling Shroff's comments "hurtful".

Kaif lived in London for three years before moving to India. At age 14, Kaif won a beauty contest in Hawaii, and received her first modelling assignment in a jewellery campaign. She subsequently modelled professionally in London, working for freelance agencies and appearing regularly at the London Fashion Week. During this period, she visited India for the first time after an Asian friend suggested they take a trip there.

== Career ==
=== Acting beginnings (2003–2005) ===
At a fashion show Kaif attracted the attention of London-based filmmaker Kaizad Gustad. She made her acting debut in Gustad's Hindi-English heist film Boom starring Amitabh Bachchan, Gulshan Grover, Jackie Shroff, Madhu Sapre and Padma Lakshmi. While filming in India, Kaif received other offers and decided to stay in the country; she then changed her surname to her father's because she thought it would be easier to pronounce. She was noticed as a model after walking the ramp for Rohit Bal at the India Fashion Week and appeared in the first Kingfisher Calendar. After endorsing such brands as Coca-Cola, LG, Fevicol and Samsung, Kaif soon established a successful modelling career in India.

Boom (2003) had its first screening at the Cannes Film Festival, where it was heavily promoted, but emerged as a commercial and critical failure. Kaif's portrayal of a supermodel ensnared in the Mumbai underworld was poorly received; Ziya Us Salam of The Hindu wrote of the weak performances by Kaif and the other female stars, criticising their inexpressiveness. She later dismissed Boom as an unimportant part of her career, ascribing her choice to her unawareness of Indian audiences' film taste then. Hindustan Times reported that after Boom's release, Kaif was written off due to her poor Hindi and thick British accent; as a result, filmmakers were hesitant in casting her in their films. Kaif soon began working on her diction through Hindi classes. In 2003, director Mahesh Bhatt replaced Kaif with Tara Sharma in Saaya as he found Kaif's acting on set subpar compared to her audition for the role.

After the failure of her first Bollywood project, Kaif appeared in the Telugu film Malliswari (2004), in which she played the title role of a princess forced to flee from her murderous caretaker. Kaif received a reported salary of ₹7.5 million (US$80,000) for the film, the highest for a female lead at the time in South Indian cinema; Sify attributed this achievement to her looks and figure. Despite negative reviews for her acting, she was nominated for a Filmfare Award for Best Actress – Telugu and received several film offers afterwards. Malliswari was a profitable venture. In 2005, Kaif appeared briefly as Abhishek Bachchan's girlfriend in Ram Gopal Varma's political thriller Sarkar. She next featured alongside Salman Khan, Sushmita Sen and Sohail Khan in Maine Pyaar Kyun Kiya?, a film she considered her "first real step into Bollywood". Directed by David Dhawan, the film was a successful remake of the romantic comedy Cactus Flower. For her role as a suicidal model, Kaif received the Stardust Award for Breakthrough Performance – Female. According to Sukanya Verma of Rediff.com, "Katrina's Disney princess-like charm adds to her adorable screen presence". Kaif followed with her second Telugu film, Allari Pidugu, in which she had "very little role to play and shake a leg or two with the hero", according to a critic from The Hindu.

=== Breakthrough (2006–2008) ===
In 2006, she appeared in Raj Kanwar's unsuccessful Humko Deewana Kar Gaye, which marked the first of her frequent collaborations with costar Akshay Kumar. It tells the story of two like-minded strangers who fall in love despite being engaged to others. A Sify critic wrote that Kaif was "passably competent in a tailor-made role, giving a mild emotional spin to a couple of scenes" but was overshadowed by her supporting actresses. The same year, Kaif played an actress with Mammootty in the Malayalam crime thriller Balram vs. Tharadas.

Kaif's career prospects improved in 2007, when she appeared in four Bollywood hits. In an interview with The Indian Express, she called Vipul Amrutlal Shah's romantic comedy Namastey London her first dominating role. Kaif used her life in London as a reference for her role of Jasmeet Malhotra, a spoilt British Indian girl intent on marrying her self-centred British boyfriend despite her parents' disapproval. Although critics expressed mixed views on the film, Sukanya Verma wrote that Kaif "suits the role to the T" and "brings the zingy mix of her character alive with style and substance". Kaif's chemistry with co-star Akshay Kumar was particularly well received, with Nikhat Kazmi of The Times of India calling their casting "refreshing". Taran Adarsh from Bollywood Hungama found Kaif confident in Humko Deewana Kar Gaye and Namastey London and "a revelation" in the latter, praising her for being convincing in the complex scenes. In the book Indian Film Stars: New Critical Perspectives, author Michael Lawrence wrote that filmmakers' decision to cast Kaif as a non-resident Indian in several films, including Namastey London, was to capitalise on her foreign looks. Lawrence considered Kaif's Hindi with an English accent part of her appeal.

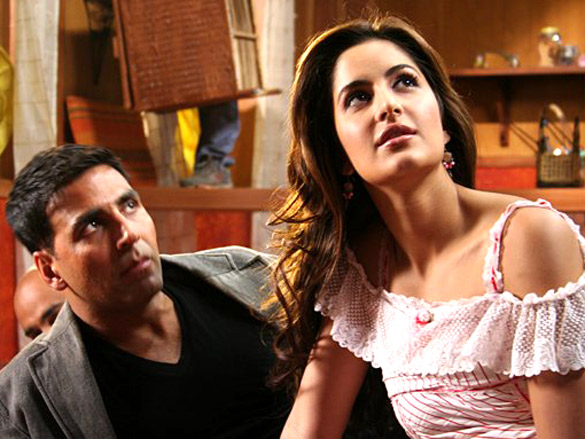
Kaif and Akshay Kumar on the set of Welcome (2007); they teamed in several successful films.

Kaif had a supporting role as a doctor in the sports drama Apne, a highly anticipated release as it marked the first appearance of Dharmendra with his sons, Sunny Deol and Bobby Deol. After Apne she rejoined director David Dhawan and Salman Khan for the comedy Partner, a remake of Hitch which co-starred Govinda and Lara Dutta. With a worldwide revenue of ₹1.03 billion (US$11 million), the film was a major financial success. Kaif's final film of the year was Anees Bazmee's comedy Welcome, alongside Akshay Kumar, Nana Patekar, Mallika Sherawat and Anil Kapoor. Although the film generated mostly negative reviews, it proved to be the second highest-grossing Bollywood film of 2007. The similarity of Kaif's roles was noted by Shoma Chaudhury of Tehelka, who called her "unabashed eye-candy", adding that she was "a pretty prop in Welcome" and "more of the same in Partner and Apne".

In 2008, Kaif had three releases, the first of which was Abbas–Mustan's action thriller Race, a story about two stepbrothers-turned-rivals who are in contention for their father's insurance money. Kaif played Saif Ali Khan's secretary, who is his stepbrother's (Akshaye Khanna) lover. Nikhat Kazmi was appreciative of the film's look and action but found Kaif unimpressive in her role. Kaif rejoined Akshay Kumar in Anees Bazmee's action comedy Singh Is Kinng, which earned ₹1.25 billion (US$13 million) worldwide to become her sixth consecutive box-office success. However, she received mixed reviews for her performance. Rajeev Masand of News18 found Kaif "an eyesore in every sense of the word" and her acting weak. Kaif's final film of the year—Subhash Ghai's drama Yuvvraaj—was a major box-office failure. In preparation for her role as a cellist she practised with orchestra members. Her portrayal of a girl forbidden by her father from marrying her poor lover was well received by Sify's Sonia Chopra: "Katrina is wonderful, plays the cello convincingly, and looks ethereal." Despite the film's mixed critical reception, its screenplay was added to the library of the Academy of Motion Picture Arts and Sciences for its artistic merit.

Up until this point, Kaif's voice was dubbed over by voice artists in most of her films due to her lack of fluency in Hindi and other Indian languages. (Note: In Boom, Namastey London and Singh Is Kinng, Kaif's real voice was retained.) Although her films during this period were financially successful, critics noted that she played unimportant roles in them as they were generally male-dominated, whereas her performances were largely criticised. She justified choosing these glamorous roles as part of learning without any goal for a certain kind of film. When criticised for her reluctance to appear in smaller scale films to garner credibility as an actress, she responded: "I do not believe that you have to take off your make-up and look simple to prove you're an actress ... I'm not going to make a morose film, which no one will watch just so people take me seriously as an actress." Kaif participated in Shah Rukh Khan's "Temptations Reloaded" world concert tour in 2008. Also featuring Kareena Kapoor and Arjun Rampal, the tour began in Amsterdam in June and ended four months later in Dubai's Festival City Arena before an audience of 15,000.

=== Mainstream success (2009–2013) ===
After a string of films in which she was cast in glamorous, "arm candy" roles, Kaif began looking for more substantial parts. One such opportunity arose with Kabir Khan's terrorism drama New York (2009). Costarring John Abraham and Neil Nitin Mukesh, the film follows the lives of three friends when one of them is wrongly detained after 9/11. Kaif played Maya, a college student who unknowingly marries a terrorist. Having faced racial discrimination when she was in London, Kaif identified with the character's experiences. New York performed well at the box office and received favourable reviews. According to Subhash K. Jha, Kaif was successful as an actress in a substantial role and convincingly portrayed her character's transition from a carefree student to a tormented wife. A reviewer for The Times of India considered it to be her career's best performance. New York brought Kaif her first Filmfare Award nomination for Best Actress. She then appeared in a cameo for India's first underwater thriller Blue. Kaif starred with Ranbir Kapoor in Rajkumar Santoshi's hit comedy, Ajab Prem Ki Ghazab Kahani (2009), as an orphan forced to marry a rich man. Taran Adarsh of Bollywood Hungama praised the actors' energetic pairing and found that Kaif performed well in both emotional and light scenes. Her final film of the year was Priyadarshan's comedy De Dana Dan. She performed with Akon at the closing ceremony of the 2009 Indian Premier League at the Wanderers Stadium in Johannesburg,

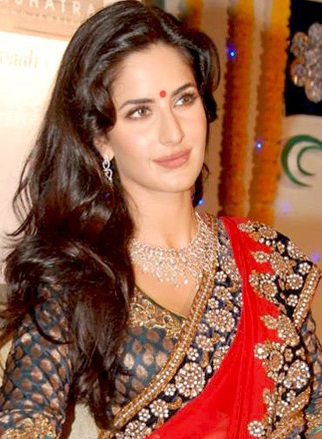
Kaif in 2010

In 2010, Kaif appeared in Prakash Jha's political thriller Raajneeti as part of an ensemble cast which included Ranbir Kapoor, Ajay Devgan, Arjun Rampal, Nana Patekar, Manoj Bajpai and Sarah Thompson. The film took inspiration from The Mahabharata and Mario Puzo's 1969 novel The Godfather. Set in Bhopal, the film described a fiercely fought election campaign by two parties attempting to seize power with manipulation, corruption, and treachery. Kaif rejected the media's speculation that her character was based on Sonia Gandhi. In preparation for her role as Indu, a politician loosely based on Draupadi, she watched Priyanka Gandhi's election campaign videos to study the body language and interaction of politicians. The film received mainly positive reviews from critics. Rajeev Masand found Raajneeti "thrilling and gripping", though Namrata Joshi was critical of the film's depiction of women. Nikhat Kazmi considered Kaif's performance to be "carefree and camera-unconscious" and wrote that she "seems to slip into the high-powered shoes easily". The film was highly successful at the box office, receiving a total collection of ₹1.4 billion (US$15 million).

Kaif collaborated with Akshay Kumar for the sixth time in the slapstick comedy Tees Maar Khan (2010), in which she played an aspiring actress, the girlfriend of a criminal (Kumar). In the film, Kaif performed a popular item number titled "Sheila Ki Jawani". The song was choreographed by the film's director Farah Khan and for the belly dancing portion, Kaif was trained by expert Veronica D'Souza. In contrast to the song's popularity, Tees Maar Khan was panned by critics and its box-office performance was poor. Kaif's portrayal was not well received; Renuka Rao of Daily News and Analysis found her "drama queen act" poor but noted that she was exceptional in the item number.

The following year, Kaif was paired with Hrithik Roshan in Zoya Akhtar's coming-of-age dramedy Zindagi Na Milegi Dobara. The film narrates the story of three friends on a bachelor trip and features Kaif as Laila, a diving instructor who becomes romantically involved with Roshan's character and inspires him overcome his workaholism. She had difficulty filming her scuba diving scene due to her inexperience; she was so scared she dug her nails into costar Roshan. The film was a critical and commercial success. Richard Kuipers of Variety commented that she is "delightful" in the role of a cordial young woman who encourages others to confront their weaknesses. Zindagi Na Milegi Dobara received numerous Best Film accolades. The romantic comedy Mere Brother Ki Dulhan (2011), produced by Yash Raj Films, starred Kaif alongside Imran Khan and Ali Zafar. She found herself challenged by the role of Dimple Dixit, whose loquacious and unpredictable nature strongly contrasted with Kaif's personality. The film opened to mixed reviews, but Kaif was generally praised for her portrayal. The book Mother Maiden Mistress calls Dimple one of the more interesting female characters of the year. According to Gaurav Malani of The Economic Times, the film is mainly watchable for "Katrina's live-wire energy wherein she never goes overboard and keeps bustling with vivacity through the runtime." For this performance, Kaif received her second Filmfare nomination in the Best Actress category.

In 2012, Kaif appeared in "Chikni Chameli", an item number in Agneepath that incorporated dance steps from the Lavani genre (a Maharashtrian folk dance). Filming the music video, which finished in ten days, proved challenging for Kaif, as its style was new to her. Rachit Gupta of Filmfare attributed the song's success partly to her "infectious energy", noting her "gyrations and belly movements were an onslaught of attraction for the fans". Kaif appeared next in Kabir Khan's espionage thriller Ek Tha Tiger as a Pakistani ISI agent who falls in love with an Indian RAW agent. The film received predominantly positive reviews, with Aniruddha Guha of Daily News and Analysis calling it "smart and stylish". Shubhra Gupta of The Indian Express wrote about her performance: "Katrina is an able, animated foil to Salman, her long legs making her leaps and kicks credible". With worldwide earnings of ₹3.1 billion (US$33 million), Ek Tha Tiger was the highest-grossing Bollywood film of the year.

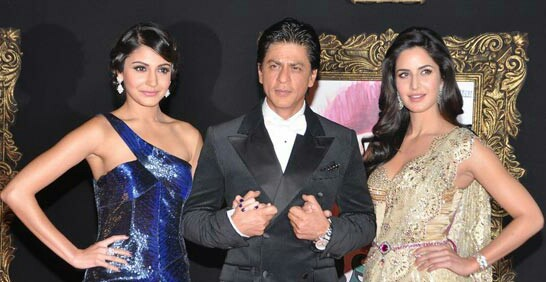
Kaif (right) with Anushka Sharma and Shah Rukh Khan at the premiere of Jab Tak Hai Jaan, 2012

Later in the year, Kaif was paired with Shah Rukh Khan in Yash Chopra's swan song, the romance Jab Tak Hai Jaan. She expressed her excitement at working with Chopra, saying he "undoubtedly is the king of romance and I have always admired the way he presents his heroines. It was always a dream to work with him and the reality is even better." She played Meera, a woman who vows to end her affair with her comatose lover if he survives. Although the film received mostly positive reviews, Kaif's performance had a mixed reception. News18 deemed Kaif inexpressive in her part and found her struggling in emotional and complex scenes. Commercially, the film proved a box-office hit with revenues of ₹2.11 billion (US$23 million) worldwide. Kaif later participated and walked the ramp in a fashion show that was held in memory of Chopra.

Kaif rejoined Shah Rukh Khan for his 2013 "Temptations Reloaded" concert in Muscat, performing to an audience of over 18,000, and joined Shah Rukh Khan, Deepika Padukone and Pitbull in Kolkata for the opening ceremony of the 2013 IPL season. In 2013, she appeared briefly with Aamir Khan in Vijay Krishna Acharya's action thriller Dhoom 3. To prepare for her role as a circus performer, she undertook a year-long regimen of Pilates, functional training and aerial straps. The film received ambivalent reviews and Kaif was criticised for taking on an insubstantial part, though Taran Adarsh found her to be "ethereal" and "moving with incredible grace in dance numbers". Earning ₹5.42 billion (US$58 million) in box-office receipts, Dhoom 3 became the highest-grossing Bollywood film of all time until it was surpassed by PK in 2014.

=== Career fluctuations (2014–2018) ===
Kaif's next appearance was in Siddharth Anand's Bang Bang! (2014), a remake of the 2010 action comedy Knight and Day. She played a bank receptionist who is unwittingly caught up with a secret agent (Hrithik Roshan). Raja Sen of Rediff.com disliked her performance, describing it as "insufferable". The film was commercially successful, though financial analysts observed that it had failed to meet box-office expectations. Kaif's sole appearance of 2015 was with Saif Ali Khan in Kabir Khan's Mumbai-based post 26/11 counter-terrorism drama Phantom. To prepare for the role of former RAW agent Nawaz Mistry, Kaif learned some Arabic. Phantom and Kaif's two releases the following year—Fitoor and Baar Baar Dekho—were commercial failures. Abhishek Kapoor's Fitoor is an adaptation of Charles Dickens' Great Expectations in which Kaif played a role based on Estella Havisham along with Tabu and Aditya Roy Kapur. Namrata Joshi found Kaif good in scenes where she dances, smiles or flirts, but inadequate in dramatic parts. Suresh Mathew of The Quint observed that the poor critical and commercial reception of Fitoor was particularly significant for Kaif, as unlike her contemporaries at this time, she failed to carry a film on her own, and her performance was panned. She was paired with Sidharth Malhotra in Nitya Mehra's science-fiction romance Baar Baar Dekho. Shubhra Gupta of The Indian Express found Kaif expressionless but praised her and Malhotra's energetic dance number in "Kala Chashma", which amassed over one billion views on YouTube. Also in 2016, she joined other Indian celebrities for the "Dream Team Tour", where they performed in various American cities.

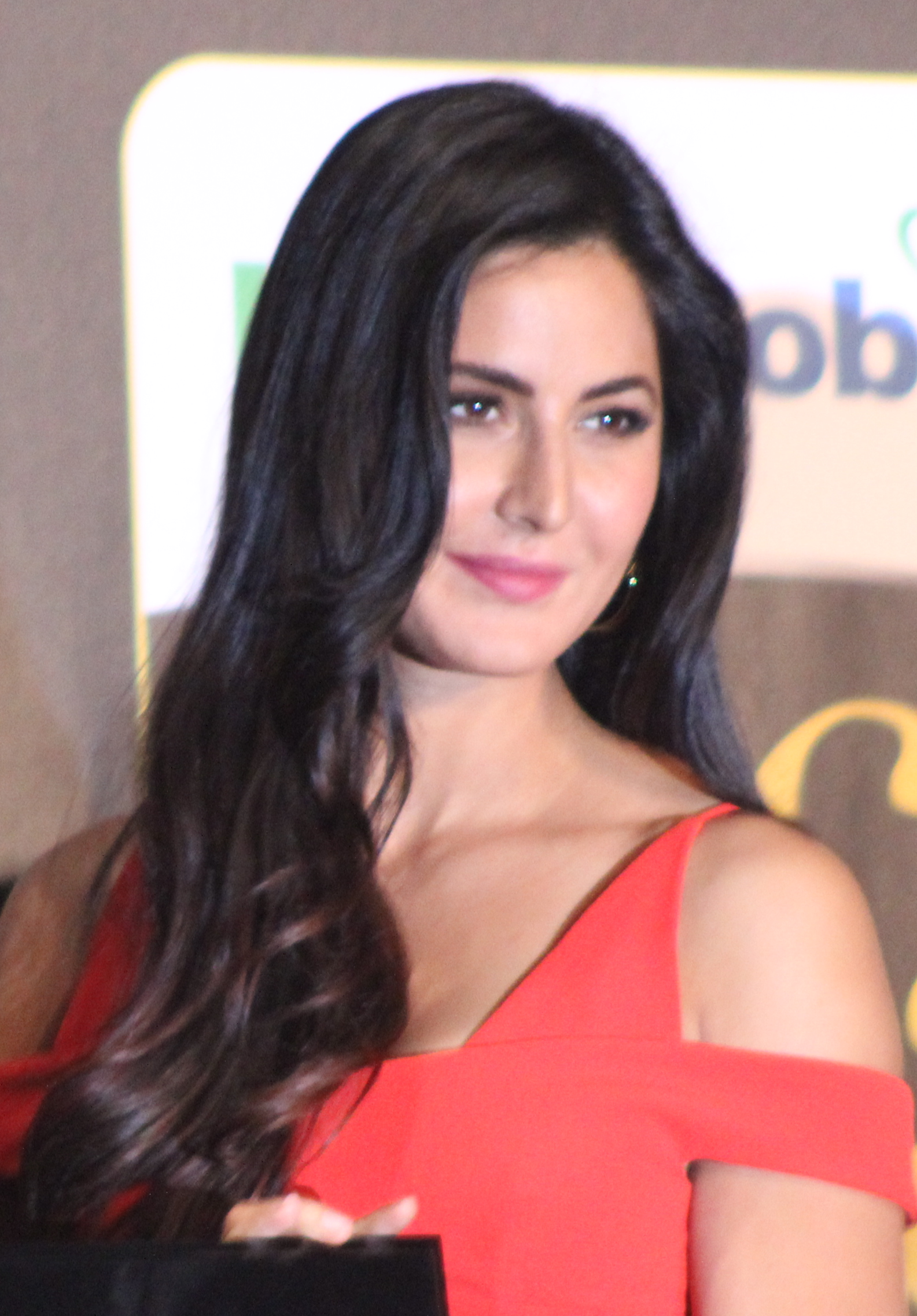
Kaif at the 18th IIFA Awards in 2017

Kaif next acted opposite Ranbir Kapoor in Anurag Basu's comedy-adventure Jagga Jasoos. The film was released in 2017 after delays caused by changes in the script and multiple reshoots. The film opened to a mixed critical response and was a commercial disappointment. Mayank Shekhar from Mid-Day praised Kaif and Kapoor for being confident before the camera, but Saibal Chatterjee of NDTV noted Kaif's failed attempt to hold her own against Kapoor. In the same year, Kaif reteamed with Salman Khan, reprising the role of Zoya in Ali Abbas Zafar's action thriller Tiger Zinda Hai, a sequel to the 2012 film Ek Tha Tiger. The film premiered on the Christmas weekend to strong box office collections, eventually grossing over ₹5.6 billion (US$60 million) worldwide to rank as her highest-grossing release. Rachit Gupta wrote that Kaif compensated for her limited dialogue by convincingly performing the scenes with hand-to-hand combat and gun fights, calling it "invigorating to see a lady kick-ass with so much élan and pull all the punches like they're real". A BBC article by Shubhra Gupta on Bollywood's objectification of female characters found Kaif's status as an action heroine refreshing.

Kaif's two releases in 2018—the period action-adventure film Thugs of Hindostan and the romantic comedy-drama Zero—were made on lucrative budgets. Despite being among the most anticipated releases that year, both films were unsuccessful at the box office. With respect to the failure of the former, Kaif admitted to have not invested much in the project due to her limited screen time. In Aanand L Rai's Zero, she reunited with Shah Rukh Khan and Anushka Sharma after Jab Tak Hai Jaan. Kaif was initially hesitant about accepting the part of a second female lead but eventually agreed after Khan and Rai insisted. Though Zero received mixed reviews from critics, Kaif's portrayal of an alcoholic actress earned her critical praise; Udita Jhunjhunwala of Mint credited her for delivering "what could be considered her most authentic performance". Calling her one of Bollywood's "scene stealers" in 2018, Sukanya Verma thought Kaif was a "revelation" and her "constantly crying eyes, poker-faced cynicism and wholehearted submission to demeaning impulses underscore the fragility under the furore". For Zero, she received a Zee Cine Award for Best Supporting Actress and a Filmfare nomination in the same category.

=== Resurgence & Selective roles (2019–2024) ===
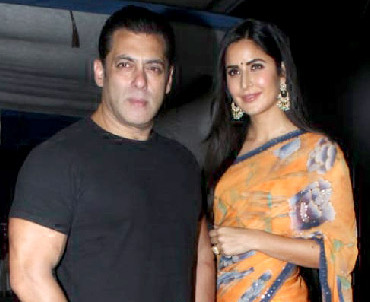
Kaif and her frequent co-star Salman Khan, pictured promoting Bharat in 2019

In 2019, Kaif once again collaborated with Salman Khan and Ali Abbas Zafar in the drama Bharat, an adaptation of the South Korean film Ode to My Father (2014). Kaif replaced Priyanka Chopra in the role of an engineer who falls in love with Khan's character. Kaif rejected media speculation that she accepted the part as a favour for her friend Khan and cited her appreciation of the script. Bharat became one of the highest-grossing Hindi films of 2019. While reviews of the film were varied, Mike McCahil of The Guardian noted the "well-tended chemistry" between Kaif and Khan and thought "the sincerity in her gaze" helped the audience ignore her character's questionable choices. Kaif's only 2020 film would have been Rohit Shetty's Sooryavanshi alongside Akshay Kumar, but the COVID-19 pandemic in India caused it several delays until its final November 2021 release. An admirer of Shetty's larger-than-life directing style, Kaif played the wife of Kumar's character. Sooryavanshi was a box-office success, briefly becoming India's highest-grossing film of the year. Kaif next played a ghost in the comedy horror film Phone Bhoot (2022), opposite Siddhant Chaturvedi and Ishaan Khatter. Reviewers from The Indian Express and The Week were unimpressed with her comedic timing.

Kaif next reprised her role as Zoya in Tiger 3 (2023), as part of the YRF Spy Universe. She considered the two-month physical training to perform her stunts in the film to be the most challenging of her career. A reviewer in critic Roger Ebert's website wrote that Kaif "gets to steal a couple of scenes", in particular a combat sequence in a bathhouse, while maintaining a superior allure with a gun compared to her co-star Salman Khan. Tiger 3 had the biggest opening weekend of Kaif's career, and went on to gross over ₹4.6 billion (US$49 million) worldwide.

In 2024, Kaif starred with Vijay Sethupathi in Sriram Raghavan's thriller Merry Christmas, about two strangers who connect on Christmas Eve. Two versions of the film were shot, one in Hindi and the other in Tamil. Kaif described the process of filming the Tamil version as particularly difficult, as she did not understand the language. Writing for Scroll.in, Jhunjhunwala praised the chemistry between Sethupathi and her, and added that "Kaif captures Maria's fragility and cheerfulness with an openness that is rare to find in her performances". The film failed commercially despite its positive critical reception.

== Personal life ==
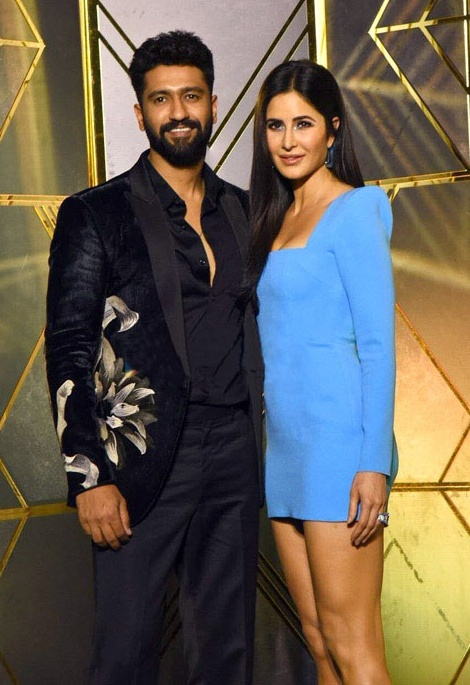
Kaif with her husband Vicky Kaushal in 2022

Kaif has a close relationship with her family, and the lack of a father figure in her life has given her a sense of responsibility towards them. While Kaif's mother is Christian and her father is Muslim, Kaif says she was allowed to practise a faith of her choice and is a "firm believer in God". The Times of India reported in 2009 that she visits Siddhivinayak Temple, Mount Mary Church, and Sufi shrine Ajmer Sharif Dargah before her films are released.

Kaif is reluctant to discuss her personal life, which has been the subject of media attention in India. "I have always believed that there is life before marriage and after marriage. Before marriage...you are termed a single woman and I choose to conduct that part of my life with absolute dignity and discretion."

Although rumours of a relationship with actor Salman Khan emerged in 2003, it was not until years after their break-up that Kaif spoke of it, calling it her first serious relationship. They have remained friends, and she credits Khan for giving her confidence and guidance. Kaif was linked to actor Ranbir Kapoor during the filming of Ajab Prem Ki Ghazab Kahani. In August 2013, photographs of Kapoor and Kaif on holidays were leaked by Stardust which were interpreted as confirmation of a romantic relationship. After the appearance of the photos, Kaif published an open letter stating that she was "upset, distressed and invaded" by the breach of privacy. They broke up in early 2016.

Kaif married actor Vicky Kaushal on 9 December 2021 in a traditional Hindu wedding ceremony at Six Senses Resort, Fort Barwara in Sawai Madhopur, Rajasthan whom she first met in early 2019. Their wedding was the subject of wide media coverage, making their official wedding pictures the most-liked post on Instagram in India at the time. Kaif and Kaushal welcomed their first child, a son named Vihaan Kaushal, on 7 November 2025.

== Off-screen work ==
Kaif supports various causes and charitable organisations. She has garnered praise from The Times of India for maintaining a low-profile about her philanthropic work. Kaif is actively involved with Relief Projects India, a charitable trust run by her mother which works in furthering the cause of underprivileged children, including providing quality education, rehabilitating and educating orphans and working to prevent female infanticide. She donates a sum of her earnings annually to the fund and her winnings from the game shows 10 Ka Dum and Kaun Banega Crorepati were donated to her mother's Mercy Home orphanage. To raise funds for a new school built by her mother's charity in Madurai, she recorded Rhyme Skool (2010), an album of nursery rhymes composed by A. R. Rahman. Kaif has also donated clothes and personal belongings to raise funds for a prenatal care unit in the Claretian Mercy Home in Madurai.

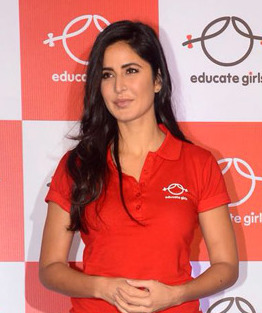
Kaif at an event for Educate Girls in 2018

Kaif has been vocal about gender equality, domestic violence and women's empowerment. She has emphasised the role of education in the fight against gender inequality and violence against women. Discussing gender pay gap, she has spoken in favour of more big-budget, female-dominated films in Hindi cinema. In 2010, Kaif was one of several celebrities who created promotional messages for Pearls Wave Trust, which campaigns against violence and abuse of women and girls. She was invited as one of the speakers at the 2016 WeUnite conference, an event organised by UN Women as part of their Orange the World initiative for gender equality and women's empowerment.

Kaif has voiced her support for LGBT rights, and causes associated with cancer and children's education. She visited the Cancer Patients Aid Association to gift cancer survivors and increase public awareness of breast and cervical cancer in 2012. The following year, she appeared alongside other celebrities in a commercial, produced by the National Film Development Corporation of India, to create awareness about children's education. Having been active with Being Human Foundation to help rehabilitate children living on the streets, Kaif walked the ramp for charity as part of "Being Human" fashion show in 2009 and 2010. In 2018, Kaif was named ambassador of Educate Girls, a non-profit organisation that promotes and supports girls' education in the remotest and educationally challenged parts of India. As part of her role as an ambassador, she visited a remote village in Madhya Pradesh.

In 2019, she launched the #Kare initiatives, a charitable program under her cosmetics' brand Kay Beauty in support of various social causes including employment of rural women. In 2007, Kaif joined the efforts of the United Nations Office on Drugs and Crime (UNODC) to curb human trafficking in India. Kaif visited sepoys in Jammu as part of NDTV's reality program Jai Jawan (2011). She also walked the ramp for designer Manish Malhotra and the Sachachari Foundation's annual charity fashion show in 2016. During the COVID-19 pandemic in India in 2020, she donated an undisclosed amount of money to PM CARES Fund and Maharashtra Chief Minister's Relief Fund, a relief effort against the outbreak, and funded small businesses of 100 dancers from the Hindi film industry.

== In the media ==
Kaif is considered among the most popular and high-profile celebrities in India. Her Bollywood success has sparked an influx of foreign talents hoping to establish themselves in the industry. According to an India Today article, despite her dissimilarity to a conventional Bollywood heroine, Kaif "turned every adversity into opportunity and climbed the slippery pole of stardom". Alia Waheed of The Guardian wrote that Kaif "fitted the new trend for a more modern image of the Bollywood heroine" through her Western style. As part of a career analysis, Nivedita Mishra of Hindustan Times noted that despite her initial poor command of the Hindi language and an unsuccessful acting debut, Kaif later took on roles in films that highlighted her "charming and jovial" screen presence. Mishra further said Kaif established herself as one of India's highest-paid actresses by accepting her limitations, emphasising strengths as an artist and making smart choices. In response to being stereotyped, Kaif spoke of believing in herself and using it as a motivation to do what she likes.

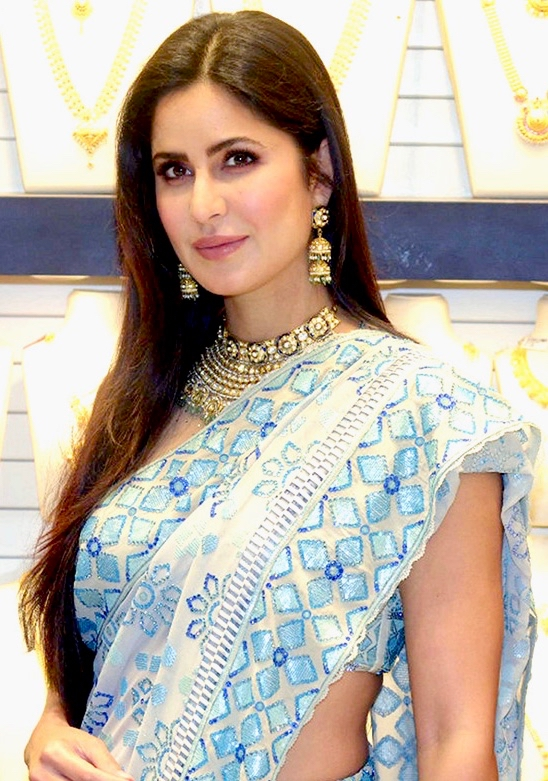
Kaif at an event in 2018

Despite being a commercially successful film star, Kaif has received mixed reviews for her acting prowess. Writing for Firstpost, Anuya Jakatdar suggested that Kaif should accept challenging parts instead of "coasting on her co-star's box office appeal" and criticised her inclination towards glamorous roles. Khalid Mohamed of Khaleej Times similarly found her unwillingness to take risks by acting in independent films a weakness. Asked if she has a dream role, Kaif said she chooses scripts intuitively and does not have a preference for a particular genre. Kaif's dancing ability has received better reviews; she was described as one of Bollywood's best dancers by The Times of India and The Indian Express. Rachit Gupta hails her "the undisputed Queen of dance numbers in Bollywood". Initially reluctant to dance in films, Kaif has developed a love for dancing and later described it as a joyful and relaxing experience. In 2010, she said she spent several hours a day practising traditional dance.

Kaif is cited in the media as one of India's most beautiful celebrities, and has ranked highly in polls choosing the most attractive Indian celebrities. She was named the "World's Sexiest Woman" by FHM India five times from 2008 to 2013, and appeared on Verve's list of most powerful women in 2009 and 2010. The UK magazine Eastern Eye called her the "Sexiest Asian Woman" from 2008 to 2010, and again in 2013. Kaif was named The Times of India's "Most Desirable Woman" in 2010, and was later ranked second from 2011 to 2013. In 2010 and 2011, Mattel released two sets of Barbie dolls modelled on Kaif. The Indian edition of People described her as "India's Most Beautiful Woman" in 2011 and three years later she topped Maxim India's "Hot 100" poll. A life-size, wax figure of her was installed in London's Madame Tussauds in March 2015, making her the eighth Bollywood actor to have been replicated as a wax statue there. Shikha Talwar of GQ India commented on Kaif's "enviable physique", which she attributed to her workout routines and healthy diet. Journalists from The Hindu and Hindustan Times respectively took note of her "trademark elegance and simplistic style" and the "sense of originality and immense grace" in her fashion.

In 2019, Kaif launched her cosmetic brand Kay Beauty in partnership with the Indian e-commerce company Nykaa. It included an array of products including lipsticks, foundations, highlighters, blush compacts. Speaking to Cosmopolitan, she said her brand aims to defy society's exclusive beauty standards and promote inclusivity and comfort in one's skin. The brand which was India's first celebrity makeup brand at the time, has been praised for its inclusivity and diversity. Kaif has been considered among the highest paid actresses in India. She is a celebrity spokesperson for a number of brands including Slice, Nakshatra, Lux, Panasonic, Lakmé and L'Oréal. The Economic Times ranked Kaif India's second most prominent endorser in 2012. Hindustan Times reported in 2014 that she received ₹50 million (US$530,000) to ₹60 million (US$640,000) for each endorsement, making her one of India's highest-paid celebrity endorsers. Kaif was included on Forbes' list of India's best-known entertainers from 2012 to 2019, (Note: Kaif's annual incomes in 2012 and from 2014 to 2019 were estimated at ₹638 million (US$6.8 million), ₹395 million (US$4.2 million), ₹485 million (US$5.2 million), ₹335 million (US$3.6 million), ₹138 million (US$1.5 million), ₹336 million (US$3.6 million) and ₹236 million (US$2.5 million), respectively.) peaking at the ninth position in 2013 with an estimated annual income of ₹652 million (US$7.0 million). According to a 2021 Forbes India estimate, her net worth is ₹2 billion (US$21 million). As of 2022, she is one of the most followed Bollywood actresses on Instagram.

== Accolades ==
Kaif has received several accolades including three Filmfare Awards nominations: Best Actress for New York and Mere Brother Ki Dulhan, and Best Supporting Actress for Zero.
