= Bada Din =

- DVD cover
- Directed by: Anjan Dutt
- Starring: Marc Robinson; Shabana Azmi; Tara Deshpande
- Cinematography: Sudeep Chatterjee
- Edited by: Sanjib Dutta
- Music by: Jatin–Lalit
- Distributed by: Gramco Films
- Release date: 23 January 1998
- Country: India
- Language: Hindi

Bada Din (transl. Big Day, also a synonym for Christmas Day in India) is a 1998 Indian Hindi-language romantic drama film directed by Anjan Dutt. It stars Marc Robinson, Tara Deshpande, Shabana Azmi and Irrfan Khan. It is about a couple who face tribulations while helping a mute boy on Christmas Day (known as bada din in Hindi).

== Plot ==
Shankar babu, an underworld don of Kolkata is threatening one of the goon's his family as he had betrayed him. He ordered his men to kill him. In next scene that man was sitting in saloon for hair cut. And mute errand boy Raka came to supply tea. In the saloon Sunny a henchman of Shankar babu came and killed the man. Raka was only witness of this murder. In next scene we see David Dawson a talented but whimsical musician sitting in the bar and his manager fired him on the Christmas Day. David came back to his house and we are introduced to Lilian who is landlady of that house. She is angry with David as he had not given rent for one year. But she is affectionate towards David. David then remembered his ex-girlfriend Nandini whom he met in Darjeeling and they broke up on a Christmas Day. Then Afraid Raka came to David for protection. But David did not want to help him. Later when he saw goon's after Raka and he was called coward by Lilian David decided to go to Police station . David reports an FRI. The news went to Shankar babu and he sent Sunny to kill David. David was injured by Sunny. Lilian took care of him and they shared some beautiful moments. When David saw Sunny and other goons are after him he went to Nandini because her present husband is a Police Officer . But Nandini refused to help him. Heartbroken David came back home and saw neighbours are accusing Lilian for keeping Raka with them. Lilian broke down in tears. David decided to leave the house with Raka as he is the root of all mishaps. But Lilian stopped them. David offered Lilian to celebrate Christmas as they have none in this world to celebrate. So they started celebrating Badadin a.k.a Christmas. David and Lilian fell in love during the celebration. Sunny again came to threat David but this time David fought with courage. And he made Sunny realised that he has no fear of death and he can kill him. But as a Christian fellow they should stand each other because their community is very small and they should not fight each other. Sunny realized his mistake. Police came into scene and arrested Sunny. At last David went back home with happy Lilian in his arms and Raka started to dance with joy.

== Cast ==
- Shabana Azmi as Lilian
- Marc Robinson as David Dawson
- Tara Deshpande as Nandini Shom
- Alok Nath as Shankar Babu
- Debasish Banerjee as Police Sub-Inspector
- Kalyan Chatterjee as Karim
- Irrfan Khan as Police Inspector
- Sanjay Pathak as Raka
- Suman Mukherjee as David's friend
- Abhay Chopra

== Soundtrack ==
The soundtrack is composed by Jatin–Lalit with lyrics by Javed Akhtar. "Suno Zara" was a chartbuster, widely praised even though the film itself didn't perform spectacularly at the box office.

#	Title	Singer(s)
1.	"Kehta Hai Yeh Safar"	Kumar Sanu
2.	"Meri Aankhon Mein"	Udit Narayan, Alka Yagnik
3.	"Suno Zara"	Kumar Sanu, Alka Yagnik
4.	"Oonche Neeche Parbaton Ke" (Not in the film)	Udit Narayan, Alka Yagnik
5.	"Betaab Hum Awaara Hum"	Abhijeet
6.	"Behoshi Tan Man Mein"	Kavita Krishnamurthy, Hema Sardesai
7.	"Na Koi Tera (I)" (Not used in the film)	Kavita Krishnamurthy, Udit Narayan
8.	"Na Koi Tera (II)"	Kavita Krishnamurthy, Abhijeet

== See also ==
- List of Christmas films
