= Fan (2016 film) =

2016 Indian film by Maneesh Sharma

- Theatrical release poster
- Directed by: Maneesh Sharma
- Screenplay by: Habib Faisal
- Dialogues by: Habib Faisal; Sharat Katariya
- Story by: Maneesh Sharma
- Produced by: Aditya Chopra
- Starring: Shah Rukh Khan
- Cinematography: Manu Anand
- Visual effects by: Haresh Hingorani
- Edited by: Namrata Rao
- Music by: Score: Andrea Guerra; Songs: Vishal–Shekhar
- Production company: Yash Raj Films
- Distributed by: Yash Raj Films
- Release date: 15 April 2016 (India)
- Running time: 138 minutes
- Country: India
- Language: Hindi
- Budget: ₹105 crore
- Box office: ₹188.40 crore

Fan is a 2016 Indian Hindi-language psychological action thriller film directed by Maneesh Sharma and produced by Aditya Chopra under his banner Yash Raj Films. It stars Shah Rukh Khan in a dual role as Aryan Khanna, a film star, and his obsessive fan and lookalike, Gaurav Chandna. Gaurav beats up a rival actor to appease Aryan, but is instead punished by his idol; heartbroken, the fan plans revenge.

Sharma had originally conceived the idea of Fan in 2006 and narrated the story to Chopra, who advised him against the challenging project for his directorial debut. In the same year, Yash Chopra narrated it to Shah Rukh, who expressed interest in being part of the project. The project was revived in late 2013, and Shah Rukh underwent 3D scanning in 2014. Principal photography began in July 2014 and was concluded in November 2015. Fan was a songless film; a soundtrack album consisting of a marketing song in different languages was composed by Vishal–Shekhar and the original score was composed by Andrea Guerra.

Fan was heavily marketed; it was released internationally on 15 April 2016 after several delays. The film opened to mixed-to-positive reviews from critics, who praised Khan's performance, the visual effects, and action sequences, but criticised the screenplay. At the 63rd Filmfare Awards, Fan received the Filmfare Award for Best Special Effects.

== Plot ==
Gaurav Chandna is a Delhi-based hardcore and obsessive fan of Bollywood superstar Aryan Khanna. He harbors a crush on Neha, his friend, and neighbor who works at a call center. Gaurav's face bears an uncanny resemblance to Aryan's, which helps him win the local talent show by impersonating Aryan. Encouraged by his parents, he embarks on a train journey to Mumbai to meet Aryan and present him with the trophy won by impersonating him.

When Sid Kapoor, an actor, expresses harsh sentiments about Aryan to the press, an infuriated Gaurav holds him hostage and beats him up. He makes him apologize to Aryan while he records it and the video is uploaded to the Internet. He sends a copy of the video to Aryan as his birthday gift. When Aryan sees the video, he gets Gaurav arrested and he is mercilessly beaten in jail, where Aryan angrily reprimands him, declaring that Gaurav is not his fan and that he had Gaurav arrested. Gaurav asks for five minutes of Aryan's time, at which Aryan scoffs at giving the fan even five seconds. Devastated, Gaurav returns home and burns all of his Aryan memorabilia, and sells his Internet cafe, vowing revenge against Aryan for turning away his fan.

A year later in London, Gaurav goes to Madame Tussauds, impersonating Aryan and purposely creating havoc, which leads to Aryan being arrested by the police. Released on bail, Aryan receives a call from Gaurav, who reveals what he did and offers to stop troubling Aryan if he apologizes. Aryan refuses, and Gaurav disguises himself as a crew member on Aryan's show where he is scheduled to perform at the wedding of a billionaire's daughter in Dubrovnik, Croatia. After performing a dance show, Aryan receives a cue card with the message "Say sorry" and realizes that Gaurav is nearby. Meanwhile, Gaurav poses as Aryan and molests one of the female guests. The host berates Aryan and asks him to leave the event. Outside, Aryan spots Gaurav and chases after him, though Gaurav escapes. The molestation incident is reported by the media, resulting in a tarnished reputation and boycotts of Aryan's shows.

Gaurav escalates things further. He invades Aryan's home in India and vandalizes his trophy collection, even frightening his wife and children. In response, Aryan visits Gaurav's parents in Delhi and meets Neha. With their help, Aryan impersonates Gaurav at the local talent show; he declares Gaurav's love to Neha and tells about Gaurav's action, to the ire of the audience. This provoked Gaurav, who shoots at Aryan with a gun. Aryan again chases after Gaurav and subdues him after a bloody fight at an under-construction building.After the fight,a bruised and enraged Aryan asks Gaurav to give up impersonating him and live a normal life. Gaurav responds by telling Aryan that he has destroyed his life and reminds him that he still has not apologized. Gaurav flings himself off the roof to his death, with a smile on his face. Aryan's name is cleared from all the controversies, but the ordeal haunts him, and his name is forever linked with Gaurav's, both in his mind and in the eyes of the public. On his next birthday, Aryan goes out to the roof to greet his fans.

When he is about to turn to go back inside, he sees a haunting glimpse of Gaurav among the crowd, smiling up at him, upon which he turns back to the crowd with greater respect and appreciation. Before the end credits, a montage of Gaurav's memories with Aryan Khanna and his journey to Mumbai are shown as photographs prior to his obsessive revenge days.

== Cast ==
The cast is listed below.

- Shah Rukh Khan in a dual role as
  - Aryan Khanna, a film star- Main Protagonist
  - Gaurav Chandna, Aryan's obsessive fan and lookalike- The Main Antagonist
    - Harsh Kumar as Teenager Gaurav
    - Rian Gupta as Child Gaurav
- Shriya Pilgaonkar as Neha Singh, Gaurav's crush
- Waluscha De Sousa as Bella Khanna, Aryan's wife
- Sayani Gupta as Sunaina, Aryan's manager
- Yogendra Tikku as Mr. Chandna, Gaurav's father
- Deepika Amin as Mrs. Chandna, Gaurav's mother
- Taher Shabbir as Sid Kapoor, Aryan's rival
- Indraneel Bhattacharya as Akhtar, Aryan's lawyer
- Parveen Kaur as Aunty, a Train passenger
- Megha Gupta as Payal
- Amarjeet Singh as a Show Host
- Shikha Malhotra as News anchor
- Mohit Bagri as Dhruv Khanna, Aryan and Bella's son
- Namit as Naresh Bhutiani
- Bianca Colaco as Ishaa Khanna, Aryan and Bella's daughter
- Digvijay Rohildas as Aryan's bodyguard
- Prashant Walde
- Niranjan Asrani as Mumbai Police Commissioner T. Rampal

== Production ==
=== Development and casting ===
After serving as an assistant director in the Yash Raj Films productions Fanaa and Aaj Nachle, Maneesh Sharma narrated the story of Fan to Aditya Chopra in 2006. Chopra felt that the film was too ambitious and expensive for a debut and advised him to abandon the idea, after which Sharma took up Band Baaja Baaraat. Yash Chopra narrated the story to Shah Rukh Khan in 2006, and Khan became interested in the project. The idea of Fan came from Sharma's observation of the desires and fans' expectations of the celebrities they admired. Sharma felt that the concept hadn't been greatly explored in cinema.

In today's world, people have virtual access to whoever they like but that doesn't mean they know the person... It excited me as we explored it as a story and somewhere down the line, it took the form of something set in a thriller genre.

— Maneesh Sharma on the concept for Fan

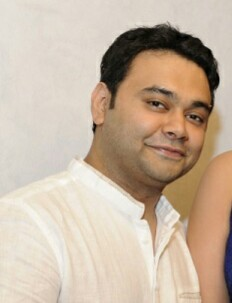
Sharma (pictured) had wanted Fan to be his first project.

On 16 December 2013, Yash Raj Films announced the project with Shah Rukh Khan as the main lead and Sharma as the director. The project was discussed for over a year before Shah Rukh agreed to sign the film. On 25 March 2014, it was announced that Greg Cannom would develop the look of Shah Rukh in the film and be responsible for the prosthetic makeup. Khan underwent 3D scanning for his look as a young boy. Though it had at one time been reported that Shah Rukh was scheduled to play a 17-year-old boy in the film, Khan later denied the claim. Shah Rukh started working on the film before the release of his previous venture, Happy New Year, and underwent a makeover for the film. According to Shah Rukh, Fan is a "family" film. He wanted to do an "intense yet commercially viable film".

Amid speculation, Shah Rukh confirmed the film would have two heroines, but added that the film "did not require a big female star". Model Waluscha de Sousa played an important role in the film. She was cast following an audition with Shanoo Sharma. Ileana D'Cruz, Vaani Kapoor, and Parineeti Chopra were each considered for the role of Aryan's wife before de Sousa was cast. She had previously acted with Khan in a few commercials. The film also marked the debut acting role of Shriya Pilgaonkar, the daughter of Sachin Pilgaonkar, who had an important role in Fan. She was selected after an audition. The screenplay and dialogues were written by Sharat Katariya and Habib Faisal respectively. Manu Anand and Namrata Rao were hired as the cinematographer and editor, respectively. Parveen Shaikh and Oh Sea Young served as the film's action directors. Sayani Gupta, Deepika Amin, and Yogendra Tiku were also confirmed to play supporting roles in the film. Gupta was chosen after Shanoo was impressed with her performance in Margarita with a Straw.

=== Filming and post-production ===
Principal photography began in July 2014. The film was shot in Mumbai, Dubrovnik, London and Delhi. In October 2014, Shah Rukh reported that he had finished shooting a 20-day schedule for Fan. Parts of the film were shot outside Shah Rukh's residence in Mannat. In April 2015, Fan became the first film to shoot at the Madame Tussauds in London. Khan's statue was temporarily moved to the London Eye for filming. In February 2015, Khan was spotted shooting in the Delhi neighbourhood. Filming continued in Dubrovnik despite Khan suffering a knee injury while filming an action sequence. India Today reported that Shah Rukh was back in Mumbai in April. Khan simultaneously shot for Dilwale and Raees along with Fan.

Shah Rukh was injured again when he travelled back to Mumbai. In November, Shah Rukh revealed that the film used dialogues from his previous ventures, one being Baazigar. On 16 November 2015, Khan returned to Delhi for additional filming. In November 2015, it was announced that the filming of the project was complete. In January 2016, the filming visual of the song "Jabra Fan" was revealed. The song was shot in the streets of Delhi.

For dubbing the role of Gaurav, Shah Rukh had to modulate his voice. Along with visual effects, prosthetics were used to make Shah Rukh seem younger. The production was made on an estimated budget of ₹850 million. Produced by Chopra under the banner Yash Raj Films, which also distributed the film, its final cut ran for 142 minutes.

== Music ==
Fan was a songless film. The film features an original score composed by Italian composer Andrea Guerra, whereas the soundtrack of Fan consisted of a promotional track that was not included in the film, which was composed by Vishal–Shekhar with lyrics written by Varun Grover. The first song "Jabra Fan", was released as a single track on 1 February 2016. It was recorded in multiple languages, and released as a part of the soundtrack on 29 February under the YRF Music label. It also includes the trailer theme music and a remixed mashup of "Jabra Fan".

== Marketing ==
Shah Rukh's house was graffiti-painted as a promotional strategy. The logo of the film, the first of its kind with a collage of pictures of Shah Rukh's real fans, was released on 23 October 2015. The makers released a 2-minute teaser for the film on Shah Rukh Khan's birthday on 2 November 2015. This was followed by a teaser poster, that released five days later. A music video of the song "Jabra Fan", released on 1 February 2016 for promotional purposes. The official trailer of Fan was released on 29 February 2016 and was viewed 4 million times on the Internet in the first 24 hours. The 3-minute video later garnered over 20 million views on YouTube with more than 170 thousand likes, a record for a Bollywood film. A game based on the film was in development by 99Games in February 2016 and released in 2017. A contest titled 'Tu Nahi Samjega' was organized by Yash Raj Films.

== Release ==
Fan was scheduled for release in late 2014 or early 2015, but owing to the injuries sustained by Shah Rukh during the filming of Happy New Year, the film's release date was postponed to 14 August 2015. The complex post-production visual-effects work further pushed the release of Fan to early 2016. After several delays, the film was released on 15 April 2016 in 3,500 screens in India and about 1,100 screens abroad. It was produced on a budget of ₹850 million (US$9.1 million) and an additional ₹200 million (US$2.1 million) was spent on publicity, for a combined cost of approximately ₹1.05 billion (US$11 million). The studio recouped part of their investment before release by selling the satellite rights to Sony Pictures Networks at around ₹450 million (US$4.8 million).

== Reception ==
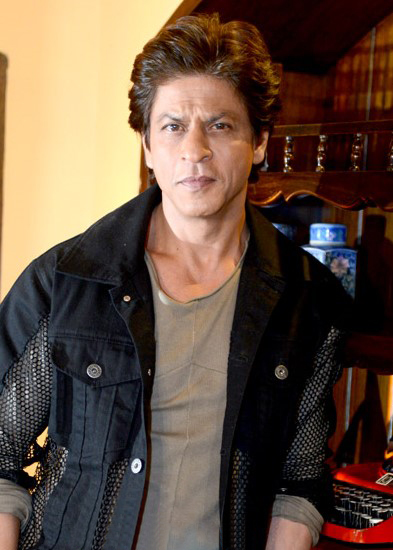
Khan's performance attracted many positive reviews.

=== India ===
Fan received a highly positive response from critics. Critics praised Khan's performance, visual effects, and action sequences while they criticized the loosely written script and editing. Raja Sen from Rediff.com gave the film 4.5 out of 5 stars and called Fan a brilliant film with Shah Rukh Khan at his best. Zee News also awarded the film 4.5 stars, saying "The movie encapsulates the fandom which SRK as a star enjoys and why his fans must watch this to understand how he achieved what he did." The Times of India rated the film 4 out of 5 and commented, "Fan is Shah Rukh Khan's triumph all the way. He pulls off a terrifically dramatic double act, altering his look, feel, and intensity, but as Gaurav, Shah Rukh makes you forget everything;– except feeling scared." Mid-Day also saw the film worthy of 4/5 and reviewed, "Right from the beginning of this thriller, which undoubtedly boasts of one, oops, two of his best performances, it is evident why Shah Rukh Khan is needed for a film of this sort, and why only someone in his position and with his caliber could do it too." Aditya Sinha from Asianet News called it Khan's "greatest performance" to date.

Taran Adarsh from Bollywood Hungama gave the film 3.5 stars out of 5 and opined, "On the whole, Fan has a brilliant first half, but loses track in the second hour, only to pick up again towards the pre-climax. The writing should've been tighter, but what works is the terrific act by SRK as the fan." The Hindu called the film Khan's return to form and said, "SRK couldn't have found a better vehicle than Fan, both as an actor and as a celebration of the highs and the lows of his stardom. A stardom whose enormity he'd himself find difficult to wrap around his head." The Indian Express also gave the film 3.5 out of 5 stars and stated, "Fan is a triumph. Shah Rukh Khan played to all his strengths, and he plays it just right, gliding in and out of the star and the fan, creating distinct identities and outlines in one scene, and blurring the lines just so in the next." Anna M. M. Vetticad of Firstpost writes, "Much of its appeal lies in the fact that the central characters are not stereotyped. Besides, when Shah Rukh Khan decides to go real and understated, it always makes for compelling viewing."

India Today gave the film 3.5 stars and commented, "Maneesh Sharma and Shah Rukh Khan hand-deliver the mindscape – of both the fan and the star – on screen. And brilliantly," but felt that unnecessary scenes could have been cut from the film. Anupama Chopra of Hindustan Times also rated it 3.5 out of 5 and said that she "can guarantee that the next time you see a horde of screaming fans, you'll observe them more keenly. You might even wonder what their stories are." NDTV Movies gave the film 3 stars out of 5 and opined, "Fan works for the most part because it has the fabulous SRK act as a 'young' star-struck boy. His energetic performance is worth the price of the ticket – if not more." Rajeev Masand of CNN-IBN gave 3 stars out of 5, commenting "As I left the cinema having watched the film, I found myself conflicted about my feelings. There is so much to admire here, but it’s evident the filmmakers think they’ve made a smarter film than they have. Still, Fan works for the most part. And anyone who – like me – had grown tired and disappointed with Shah Rukh's unwillingness to step out of his comfort zone will have reason to be a fan again."

=== Overseas ===
On Rotten Tomatoes the film has a rating of 81%, based on 26 reviews, with an average rating of 6.8/10. Mark Kermode of The Guardian rates the film 4/5 and writes, "Shah Rukh Khan outdoes himself twice in this dual-role psychological thriller." Sonali Kokra of The National rates the film 3.5/5 and writes, "Just for these rare moments inspired by Shah Rukh Khan's real life, you should go and watch Fan." Manjusha Radhakrishnan of Gulf News rates the film 3/5 and opines, "It's engaging to watch a powerful actor and his seemingly powerless admirer indulge in a twisted battle of wills." Anil Sinanan of Time Out rates the film 3/5 felt, "A little more restraint in maintaining the tonal consistency would have resulted in a much darker and satisfying cautionary tale about the perils of fame and blind love." Wendy Ide of Screen International wrote, "Despite the slapdash plotting, the film – taken from the point of view of the star – gives an uneasy insight into the celebrity's co-dependent relationship with the people who make him, and can destroy him."

Lisa Tsering of The Hollywood Reporter criticised the plot and wrote, "Sharma pads out the songless film with well-executed but overlong action pieces that become even more frustrating when you consider the ways time could have been better spent exploring Aryan's fascinating backstory." Majira of Cairo 360 shared the view, writing, "[The] story could have benefitted from being a bit more restrained." J Hurtado of ScreenAnarchy wrote, "This is a mediocre film saved by the presence of its overpowered, overexposed, and overconfident star." In contrast, Itrat Syed of Georgia Straight wrote that the film is "An insightful rumination on the codependency between idols and their devotees, disguised as a psychological thriller." Prathna Sarkar of International Business Times wrote, "With Fan, SRK proves why he is considered one of the finest actors in business."

=== Box office ===
On its opening day, Fan collected ₹19.20 crore in India, the fourth-highest for a Khan film at the time. Compared to the total gross of ₹52.35 crore collected in the first week, Fan collected only ₹7.75 crore in the second week, indicating a drop of 85 percent. Fan's gross in India was ₹120 crore. However, it was successful overseas, where its gross had crossed US$10 million, more than the overseas gross of Ra.One. The worldwide gross of Fan was around ₹188.4 crore.

== Accolades ==
Red Chillies VFX received the Filmfare Award for Best Special Effects at the 62nd Filmfare Awards for their work with visual effects in Fan.

Award (Note: Awards, festivals and organizations are in alphabetical order.)	Date of ceremony (Note: Date is linked to the article about the awards held that year, wherever possible.)	Category	Recipient(s)	Result	Ref.
BIG ZEE Entertainment Awards	29 July 2017	Most Entertaining Thriller Film	Fan	Nominated	
BIG ZEE Entertainment Awards	29 July 2017	Most Entertaining Actor in a Thriller Film – Male	Shah Rukh Khan	Nominated	
Filmfare Awards	14 January 2017	Best Actor	Shah Rukh Khan	Nominated	
Filmfare Awards	14 January 2017	Best Special Effects	Red Chillies VFX	Won	
Indian Film Festival of Melbourne	11–21 Aug 2016	Best Actor	Shah Rukh Khan	Nominated	
International Indian Film Academy Awards	14–15 July 2017	Best Actor	Shah Rukh Khan	Nominated	
International Indian Film Academy Awards	14–15 July 2017	Best Performance in a Negative Role	Shah Rukh Khan	Nominated	
International Indian Film Academy Awards	14–15 July 2017	Best Makeup	Greg Cannom	Won	
International Indian Film Academy Awards	14–15 July 2017	Best Special Effects	Red Chillies VFX	Won	
Mirchi Music Awards	18 February 2017	Best Song Producer (Programming & Arranging)	Sourav Roy – (for "Jabra Fan")	Nominated	
Mirchi Music Awards	18 February 2017	Best Song Engineer (Recording & Mixing)	Vijay Dayal – (for "Jabra Fan")	Won	
News18 Movie Awards	20 March 2017	Best Debut (Female)	Shriya Pilgaonkar	Nominated	
Nickelodeon Kids' Choice Awards India	5 December 2016	Best Movie Actor (Male)	Shah Rukh Khan	Nominated	
Nickelodeon Kids' Choice Awards India	5 December 2016	Best Entertainer (Note: also for Dilwale)	Shah Rukh Khan	Nominated	
Stardust Awards	21 December 2016	Best Story	Maneesh Sharma	Nominated	
Stardust Awards	21 December 2016	Best Actor	Shah Rukh Khan	Nominated	
Stardust Awards	21 December 2016	Performer of the Year – Male	Shah Rukh Khan	Won	
Stardust Awards	21 December 2016	Best Male Playback Singer	Nakash Aziz – (for "Jabra Fan")	Nominated	
Zee Cine Awards	11 March 2017	Best Performance in a Negative Role	Shah Rukh Khan	Nominated	
Zee Cine Awards	11 March 2017	Best Choreography	Vaibhavi Merchant – (for "Jabra Fan")	Nominated	
