= Encounter: The Killing =

2002 film produced and directed by Ajay Phansekar

- Directed by: Ajay Phansekar
- Written by: Ajay Phansekar
- Produced by: Ajay Phansekar; Jairaj Patil; Shyam Shroff
- Starring: Naseeruddin Shah; Dilip Prabhavalkar; Tara Deshpande
- Cinematography: B. Laxman
- Edited by: Arun-Shekhar
- Music by: Amar Mohile
- Production company: Shrinagar Films
- Release date: 9 August 2002 (India)
- Country: India
- Language: Hindi

Encounter: The Killing is a 2002 Indian Hindi-language crime film, directed and produced by Ajay Phansekar. It stars Naseeruddin Shah, Dilip Prabhavalkar and Tara Deshpande in pivotal roles. The film was released on 9 August 2002.

== Plot ==
In the Mumbai Police's Crime Branch, Senior Inspector Sam Bharucha (Naseeruddin Shah) is a trustworthy police officer who diligently performs his job. He favors rehabilitating individuals above denouncing and punishing them. The movie opens with the tale of four teenage college-bound males who have turned to sharpshooting as a quick source of income. They escape to Shrivardhan after killing hotel owner Ramanna. When the parents of Martin, one of the group, discover a large sum of money and a pistol in his backpack, they suspect their son of engaging in antisocial behavior. Martin confesses when they approach him, and they turn him over to the police right away.

Bharucha arrives in Shrivardhan, deciding to capture the other three of the group. Upon giving his staff the order to arrest everyone, the three attempt to flee and a shootout breaks out, during which Inspector Bharucha shoots Lallya and the police squad kills Sonal and Nana (two of the four teenagers). Throughout his lengthy career as a police officer, Inspector Bharucha has never killed anyone, therefore the knowledge that he has done so torments him. When he learns that Lallya was about to give himself up just before Bharucha shot him, his guilt only grows. Lallya's body has not been claimed, however the bodies of the other two shooters have been claimed by their parents and guardians.

Bharucha believes that Lallya may come from a decent family and that his parents and other family members ought to be allowed to perform his funeral. He attempts to find Lallya's parents with the help of his staff and Kiran Jaywant (Tara Deshpande), a television news reporter. An old-timer from the underworld, Punappa Avadhe (Dilip Prabhavalkar) is the proprietor of a booze den. By saying that he knows Lallya's family and will assist Bharucha in finding them, he deceives the police department and Inspector Bharucha. The film ends with Bharucha showing the dead body of Lallya to Lallya's parents who are prominent figures in society. After seeing the body, his mother and father burst into tears. Now Bharucha wears his cooling glass showing he is back in his active police job.

== Cast ==
- Naseeruddin Shah as Inspector Sam Bharucha
- Tara Deshpande as Kiran Jaywant
- Akash Khurana as Sudhakar Rao
- Ratna Pathak Shah as Mrs. Sudhakar Rao
- Dilip Prabhavalkar as Ponappa Awadhe
- Avtar Gill as DCP YA Gadgil
- Sanjeev Dabholkar as Inspector Avinash Marathe
- Rahul Mehendale as Lallya
- Milind Vaidya as Inspector Yadav
- Roshan Tirandaz as Shrin Bharucha, Sam's wife
