= Tara Deshpande =

Indian actress, writer and model (born December 1975)

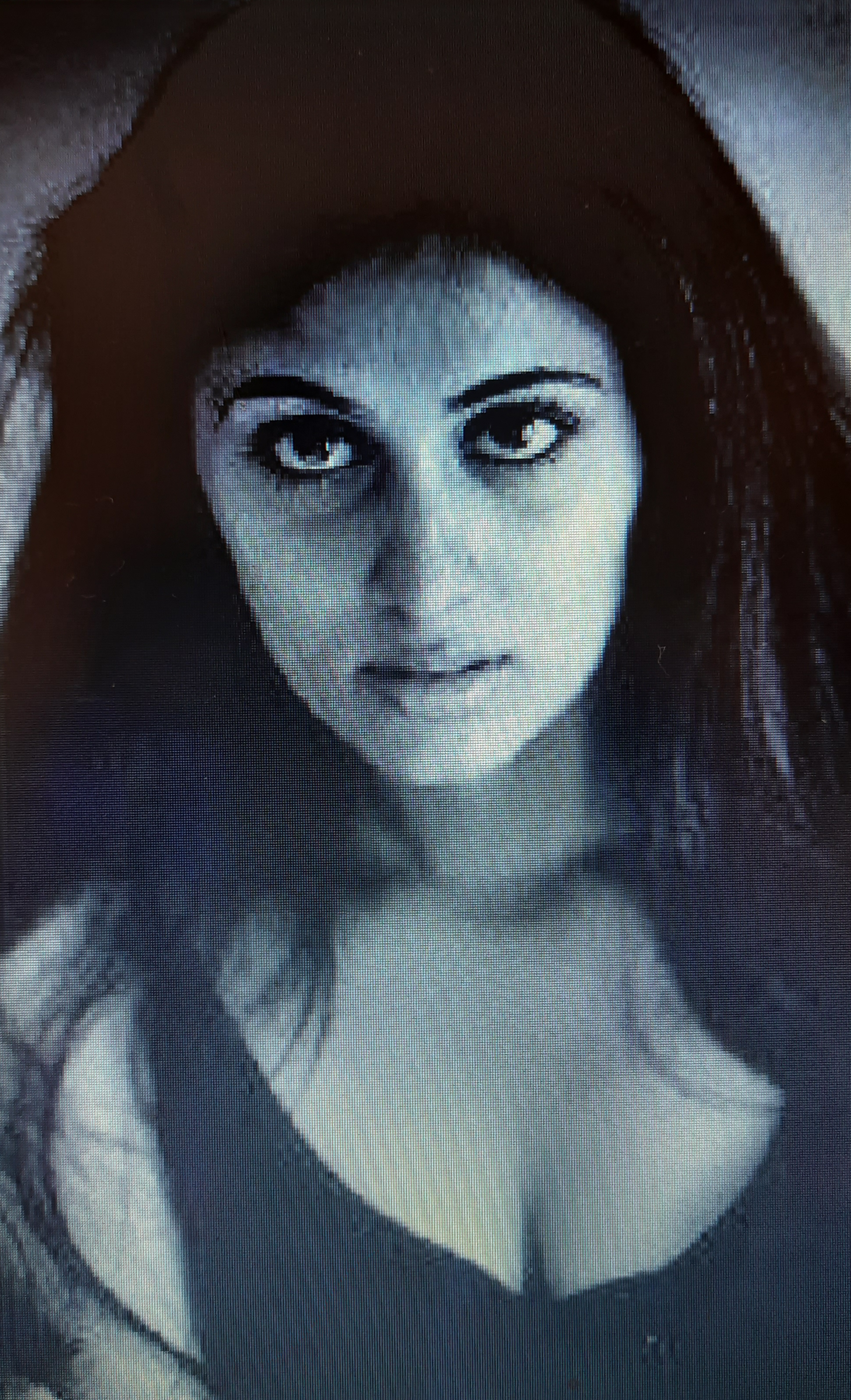
- Born: Mumbai, Maharashtra, India
- Occupation: Actress
- Years active: 1996–2002

Tara Deshpande is an Indian actress, writer, former model, and MTV VJ. Tara hosted a show called Kab Kyon Kahaan on Zee TV, along with Parth and then with Vinay Jain in the early 1990s. Before entering the world of movies, she was a model and MTV VJ and a regular on the Mumbai stage. She played Begum Sumroo in Alyque Padamsee's play of the same name. She appeared in several acclaimed films such as Sudhir Mishra's Is Raat Ki Subah Nahin and Kaizad Gustad's Bombay Boys. Since her marriage to an American citizen and move to Boston in 2001, Tara divides her time between NYC and Mumbai. Her husband works in finance and is a graduate of Harvard Business School. Tara published her first book at the age of 23: Fifty and Done (HarperCollins). Her book, A Sense for Spice: Recipes and Stories from a Konkan Kitchen (Westland Publishers), was published in 2012 and Indian Sense of Salad in 2018.

== Filmography ==
=== Film ===
Year	Title	Role	Notes
1996	Is Raat Ki Subah Nahin	Pooja	
1998	Bada Din	Nandini Shom	
1998	Bombay Boys	Dolly	
2000	Tapish	Namrata	
2002	Style	Nikki Malhotra	
2002	Censor		
2002	Encounter: The Killing	Kiran Jaywant	
2002	Danger	Unnati	

=== Television ===
Year	Title	Role	Notes
1992	Kab Kyon Kahan	Host	52 Episodes
1996	Superhit Muqabla	Anchor	Guest Anchor
1996	MTV Roadshow	Co-Host	Video Jockey
1996	MTV Get A Voice	Host	MTV Talk Show

== Digital series ==
She hosted ''Start2Bake'' for the India Food Network.

== Appearances as herself ==
Apart from her work in television and films, Tara Deshpande has also appeared in many other shows as herself. She appeared on the Movers and Shakers show with Shekhar Suman as a guest star in episode 55. She has co-hosted many award shows, like the Filmfare Awards in 1998, 2000, and 2001. Tara appeared in the Bhoomi episodes on the DD Metro channel produced by Siddharth Kak. She was also featured on the WGHB World of Chocolate show produced by PBS and was seen on the Amul hoarding as the Amul girl in her eponymous role as Dolly in Bombay Boys.

Deshpande appeared on the MasterMind quiz show hosted by Siddharth Basu as well as Zee TV quiz show featuring Sonu Nigam and Gul Panag, Naseeruddin Shah hosted by Derek O’Brien.

Tara has appeared as a speaker and commentator on numerous NDTV shows.

Tara has been associated with brands such as Borosil, Godrej, Women's India Trust, Pantene Pro V Shampoo, Wipro Shikakai, Trikaya Foods, Raymonds, Camay, Nature's Basket, and Amazon.

== Theatre ==
Tara Deshpande began her career on the professional stage at the age of 14. She was formally launched by Alyque Padamsee in the eponymous role of the historical figure Begum Sumroo in 1995. Among her other performances are the British Council production of Oliver Goldsmith's She Stoops to Conquer, Toprani productions, The Yours, Mine and Ours Show, and Peter Shaffer's Black Comedy. She trained under Marathi theatre legend Atmaram Bhende, Pearl Padamsee, and Shiraz Jefferies.

== Politics, charities and social work ==
Tara Deshpande is actively involved in many charities and vocal about various social issues. Some of the charities she is involved in include the Rotary Club of Bombay, ASPCA, PAL, Society for the Education of the Crippled, and Montana Horse Ranch Rescue. The Culinary Culture community had declared Tara Deshpande as a COVID warrior for her free meals program for those who didn't have access to food during COVID-19.

Tara has raised funds for tsunami victims in association with the Boston Herald. She was awarded for her work at Talwada, a medical centre dedicated to providing free care to Adivasis and marginalized rural workers in 2020 by the Rotary.

== Business career ==
Tara is the owner of Sweet & Savoury Bakery, a made to order food service in Mumbai.

== Writer ==
Tara Deshpande is the published author of several books. Her published works include Fifty and Done, a collection of short stories (HarperCollins India, 1999); A Sense for Spice: Recipes and Stories from a Konkan Kitchen (Westland, 2012); Indian Sense of Salad (Penguin, 2018); and Chillies and Porridge (HarperCollins, 2014). Her recipes and articles have appeared in Vogue, NYTimes, Boston Globe, Indian Express, and The Print.

Besides her charity work, Tara Deshpande has been a longtime supporter of LGBTQ rights and has been a jury member for Kashish 2018, a famous International Queer Film Festival in Mumbai. She is also a registered Democrat and served as co-chair of the South Asian Fundraising committee for Robert Reich, former Secretary of Labor, during his campaign for Governor in 2001 and was briefly part of the South Asian fundraising committee for John Kerry gubernatorial race in Massachusetts.

She has also written numerous articles on food history for the India Food Network.

=== Critical reception ===
Deshpande received critical acclaim for her portrayal of Begum Sumroo in theatre productions. Reviews published in India Today and Rediff praised her performance for its intensity and depth.

Her performance in Bombay Boys was reviewed by Bright Lights Film Journal.

== Awards and Citations ==
- Hospitality Horizon Top 5 Influencers Chefs of India.
- Uppercrust Top 20 Home Chefs of India 2020.
- Uppercrust Top 20 Food Influencers of India 2024.
