= Kaizad Gustad =

Indian film director and writer

- Born: 1968 (age 57–58); Bombay, India
- Occupations: Film director, Writer
- Years active: 1998-present
- Known for: Bombay Boys (film); Of No Fixed Address (novel)

Kaizad Gustad (born 1968) is an Indian film director and author based in Mumbai, India. He is best known for his 1998 comedy Bombay Boys. In his career as an author, he has written three books, Of No Fixed Address published in 1998 by HarperCollins, The Road to Mandalay and 7 Storeys.

== Early life ==
Gustad was born in Bombay (now Mumbai) into a Parsi family. He has an older brother and a younger sister. He grew up on a farm in the outskirts of Wadi, a town in the Kalaburagi district of Karnataka, where his father and grandfather owned cinema theaters and a stone quarrying business. He first attended the Cathedral and John Connon School in Bombay and then studied at St. Paul's School, Darjeeling. At the age of sixteen, he moved along with his family to Sydney, Australia. He later attended New York University's Tisch School of the Arts to study film.

At the age of 18, Gustad left home and started traveling to different parts of the world. He kept a diary on his travels and called it "Of No Fixed Address," in reference to the fact that he had no fixed address for three years. He used this diary as the basis for his book of short stories entitled Of No Fixed Address, which was published in 1998.

== Career ==
=== 1997 onwards ===
At 28, Gustad wrote and directed his debut feature, Bombay Boys. It starred Rahul Bose, Tara Deshpande, Naseeruddin Shah and Naveen Andrews amongst others. It was a break out commercial and critical success, paving the way for independent cinema in India. It also travelled to several film festivals worldwide and premiered at the Toronto Film Festival in 1998, followed by the Vancouver and London Film Festivals. The film was nominated for best film at Verzaubert, Berlin.

Gustad's next film was the black-comedy thriller, Boom, which had an ensemble cast of Amitabh Bachchan, Zeenat Aman, Jackie Shroff, Gulshan Grover, Javed Jaffrey along with the debut of the supermodels Padma Lakshmi, Madhu Sapre and Katrina Kaif, who were the female leads of the film. It opened to highly negative reviews and was criticized for its profanity and misogyny.

=== Later films ===
Gustad's third film, Bombil and Beatrice, was a British arthouse film made in English. His fourth film was Jackpot, a film set in a casino in Goa, which starred Sachin Joshi, Sunny Leone, and Naseeruddin Shah. It released worldwide in 2013.

== Incidents ==
In May 2010, Gustad was found guilty of negligence leading to the death of Nadia Khan, an assistant producer working on the set of his film Mumbai Central. Khan was struck by a train near Mumbai's Mahalaxmi station during shooting in May 2004.

== Personal life ==
Gustad dated Miss World Diana Hayden in 1998, during the release of Bombay Boys. In January 2004, he married Alexandra Ritt, an American woman. He has two sons, Zahaan and Zakary.
