= Humko Deewana Kar Gaye =

2006 Indian film by Raj Kanwar

- Theatrical release poster
- Directed by: Raj Kanwar
- Written by: Raj Kanwar
- Produced by: Raj Kanwar; Bhushan Kumar; Krishnan Kumar
- Starring: Akshay Kumar; Katrina Kaif; Bipasha Basu; Anil Kapoor
- Cinematography: Vikas Sivaraman
- Edited by: Kuldip K. Mehan
- Music by: Songs: Anu Malik; Guest Composition: Himesh Reshammiya; Background Score: Raju Rao
- Production companies: T-Series Films; Inderjit Films Combine
- Distributed by: T-Series Films; UTV Motion Pictures
- Release date: 14 April 2006
- Running time: 152 minutes
- Country: India
- Language: Hindi
- Budget: ₹17 crore
- Box office: ₹27 crore

Humko Deewana Kar Gaye (translation: You Made Me Crazy in Love) is a 2006 Indian Hindi-language romantic drama film directed by Raj Kanwar and produced by Raj Kanwar, Bhushan Kumar and Krishan Kumar. The film stars Akshay Kumar, Katrina Kaif, Bipasha Basu, and Anil Kapoor. Bhagyashree, Vivek Shauq, Shernaz Patel and Manoj Joshi appear in supporting roles. The film was produced by T-Series and Inderjit Films Combine. The score and soundtrack were composed by Anu Malik, while Himesh Reshammiya served as a guest composer. The film was released on 14 April 2006.

== Plot ==
Aditya is an automobile engineer who is passionate about cars. He is also a test driver for the company. Aditya is engaged to marry Sonia, a budding fashion designer. Aditya and Sonia are not on the same wavelength; while he is a traditionalist, she is not. Much as Aditya tries to overlook these facts, they keep coming in the way of their relationship. Nevertheless, their wedding date is fixed, and their families are preparing for the event.

Meanwhile, Aditya is sent by his employer to Canada to learn about a new car model to be launched in India. Sonia also leaves at the same time for Paris in connection with a fashion show. Aditya arrives in Canada and is received by his sister Simran, her husband Robby, and their son Dumpty, who all live in Canada. Aditya keeps bumping into Jia, daughter of business tycoon Yashwardhan and fiancée of businessman Karan Oberoi. She has come to Canada all by herself to shop for her wedding. Despite her family's wealth, Jia is a simple girl who seeks true love. As a child, Jia was surrounded by comfort but didn't receive attention from her busy father. Now, Jia's fiancée doesn't have time for her either. She finds a friend in Aditya, and as the two spend time together, their friendship grows.

Aditya gets an opportunity from his company to participate in a car rally. He persuades Jia to participate with him, and they win. On returning from the rally, their car gets stuck in the snow, and they have to spend the night together. They share a romantic moment, forgetting that they are engaged to other people. Soon, they realize they are falling in love. When Jia tells Aditya that she believes her father is responsible for her mother's death, Aditya tells this to his best friend and roommate, Nawab. On a drunken night, Nawab tells his other friend, who is a reporter. The reporter then publishes this story in the newspaper. Jia is extremely hurt and returns to India with the intention to marry Karan. Aditya also returns to India to marry Sonia and does not attempt to meet Jia.

Sonia turns out to be the designer hired for the wedding of Jia and Karan. Sonia persuades a reluctant Aditya to accompany her to this client's wedding. Jia's friend and Karan's secretary, Jenny, bumps into Nawab, who reveals that it was his fault that Jia's secret suspicion was published in the papers. But it is too late — the wedding ceremony is over and Jia and Karan are married. Jia then goes to meet Aditya to apologize. They confess their love for each other but agree never to meet again. However, Karan catches them talking and questions Jia. She claims that she truly loves Karan and that Aditya is just a good friend.

When Aditya leaves the wedding, he finds an upside-down car on the road, and it turns out that Jia has had an accident and is trapped under the car. As petrol leaks, Aditya goes into the car to help Jia. The car catches fire, just as Aditya manages to free her. He helps her out of the car while the press and public gather around. He accompanies Jia to Karan, telling him that Jia only belongs to him. However, Karan has a change of heart and removes Jia's mangalsutra, telling her to marry Aditya. Aditya's engagement with Sonia is also broken, and he and Jia hug, finally united.

== Cast ==
- Akshay Kumar as Aditya Malhotra
- Katrina Kaif as Jia Yashvardhan
- Bipasha Basu as Sonia Berry
- Anil Kapoor as Karan Oberoi
- Vivek Shauq as Nawab Sharif
- Shernaz Patel as Jennifer
- Manoj Joshi as Rasikbhai Galgalia
- Bhagyashree as Simran Kohli
- Mahesh Thakur as Robby Kohli
- Helen as Kitty Kohli
- Ranjeet as Harpreet Malhotra
- Neena Kulkarni as Amrit Malhotra
- Delnaaz Paul as Tanya Berry
- Gurpreet Ghuggi as Gurpreet Guggi
- Upasana Singh as Paramjeet Ghuggi
- Uttara Baokar as Nirmala Malhotra
- Ahmed Khan as Yashvardhan
- Puneet Issar as Yuvraj Berry
- Master Abhay Kanwar as Dumpty Kohli
- Himesh Reshammiya as himself - special appearance

== Soundtrack ==
Humko Deewana Kar Gaye

Soundtrack album by Anu Malik Himesh Reshammiya
- Released: 4 February 2006
- Recorded: 2005
- Venue: Mumbai
- Genre: Feature film soundtrack
- Label: T-Series
- Producer: Himesh Reshammiya

Anu Malik Himesh Reshammiya chronology
36 China Town (2006)	Humko Deewana Kar Gaye (2006)	Banaras (2006)

The soundtrack was composed by Anu Malik, while Himesh Reshammiya served as a guest composer. The lyrics were penned by Sameer.

Song	Singer(s)	Composer
"Humko Deewana Kar Gaye"	Sonu Nigam, Tulsi Kumar	Anu Malik
"Humko Deewana Kar Gaye" - II	Sonu Nigam	Anu Malik
"Humko Deewana Kar Gaye" - Sad	Sonu Nigam	Anu Malik
"Humko Deewana Kar Gaye - Sad II"	Tulsi Kumar	Anu Malik
"Tum Sansoon Main"	Himesh Reshammiya, Tulsi Kumar	Himesh Reshammiya
"Tum Sansoon Main-Remix"	Himesh Reshammiya, Tulsi Kumar	Himesh Reshammiya
"Tum Sansoon Main-Unplugged"	Himesh Reshammiya, Tulsi Kumar	Himesh Reshammiya
"Rockstar"	Abhijeet Bhattacharya, Anu Malik, Sunidhi Chauhan	Anu Malik
"Dekhte Dekhte" (Deleted from the movie)	Abhijeet Bhattacharya, Alka Yagnik	Anu Malik
"Mere Saath Chalte Chalte"	Shaan, Sunidhi Chauhan, Krishna Beura	Anu Malik
"For Your Eyes Only"	Sonu Nigam, Nandini Srikar	Anu Malik
"For Your Eyes Only-Remix"	Sonu Nigam, Nandini Srikar	Anu Malik, remixed by Jatin Sharma
"Bhula Denge Tum Ko Sanam"	Sonu Nigam	Anu Malik
"Bhula Denge Tum Ko Sanam-Remix"	Sonu Nigam	Anu Malik, remixed by Jatin Sharma
"Fanah"	K.K., Anu Malik	Anu Malik
"Fanah-Remix"	KK	Anu Malik, remixed by Akbar Sami, Anu Malik

== Reception ==
Taran Adarsh of IndiaFM gave the film 1.5 out of 5, writing, "On the whole, HUMKO DEEWANA KAR GAYE is body beautiful, minus soul." Anupama Chopra of India Today, wrote, "Kanwar has occasionally displayed a crude narrative power (Deewana, Judai), but this film, despite the opulent trappings of locations, stars and songs, is just a tired rehash. The only discovery here is that the luminous Kaif is a passable actor." Jaspreet Pandohar of BBC.com gave the film two out of five, writing, "The location and pairing may look fresh but this hackneyed story of forbidden love is well past its expiry date, offering scarcely anything original besides a few catchy songs set against snowy mountains. Feel free to give this one the cold shoulder."
