= Boom (2003 film) =

2003 Indian film by Kaizad Gustad

- Theatrical release poster
- Directed by: Kaizad Gustad
- Written by: Kaizad Gustad
- Produced by: Ayesha Shroff
- Starring: Amitabh Bachchan; Gulshan Grover; Jackie Shroff; Zeenat Aman; Katrina Kaif; Padma Lakshmi
- Cinematography: Himman Dhamija
- Edited by: Reva Childs
- Music by: Sandeep Chowta; Tavlin Singh
- Production companies: In Network Ltd. Quest Films; Xlantic Musuc Group
- Release date: 19 September 2003 (India)
- Running time: 110 minutes
- Country: India
- Languages: Hindi; English

Boom is a 2003 Indian Hindi-language black-comedy thriller film directed by Kaizad Gustad and produced by Ayesha Dutt. The film stars Amitabh Bachchan, Jackie Shroff, Gulshan Grover, Padma Lakshmi, Madhu Sapre, Zeenat Aman and Katrina Kaif (in her feature film debut). Boom was Kaif's debut film as she was a last-minute replacement of model Meghna Reddy. The movie released on 19 September 2003, exploring the involvement of fashion world with underworld organised crime.

== Plot ==
Anu Gaekwad, Sheila Bardez and Rina Kaif are three of India's most successful models. They are participating in a fashion show hosted by a renowned diamonds and jewellery brand. During the show, one of the other models trips Anu, causing her to fall to the ground — a model's worst nightmare. Fortunately, her friends Sheila and Rina are there to support her. The trio immediately confronts the model who tripped Anu, and the situation quickly escalates into a catfight in front of the audience. As the women scuffle, they are met with a big surprise. Hundreds of glittering stolen diamonds, which were due to be smuggled out of the country, fall from the other model's hair onto the catwalk. The paparazzi and celebrities quickly pick them up. Anu, Sheila and Rina are shocked as the fashion show descends into chaos. The diamonds are priceless and the gangsters responsible for the failed heist blame the glamorous trio for it. They demand that the trio recover them. The diamonds were destined for Dubai and had been stolen by Chhote Mia. They were then to be handed to his brothers. Determined to retrieve the diamonds, Bade Mia, the leader of the trio, starts playing cat and mouse with the models and the gangsters.

== Cast ==
- Amitabh Bachchan as Bade Mia
- Gulshan Grover as Medium Mia / Cutpiece Salim Suiting Shirting
- Jackie Shroff as Chhote Mia / Abdul 50-50
- Zeenat Aman as Alice
- Katrina Kaif as Rina Kaif / Popdi Chinchpokli
- Madhu Sapre as Anu Gaekwad
- Padma Lakshmi as Sheila Bardez
- Javed Jaffrey as Boom Shankar aka Boom Boom
- Seema Biswas as Bharti
- Boman Irani in a special appearance as Jewellery shop owner/Potential Diamond Buyer in Dubai
- Bo Derek – Cameo appearance
- Rohit Bal – Cameo appearance
- Wendell Rodricks – Cameo appearance
- Tarun Tahiliani – Cameo appearance

== Music ==
The soundtrack was composed by Sandeep Chowta and Talvin Singh.

#	Song	Writer	Vocalist(s)
1	"Boom"	Talvin Singh	Ila Arun
2	"Mundian To Bach Ke"	Punjabi MC	Labh Janjua
3	"Nachna Tere Naal" (Dance With You)	Rishi Rich, Jay Sean, Juggi D.	Jay Sean, Juggi D.
4	"I See You Baby"	Andrew Cato, Tom Findlay, Tod Wooten	Groove Armada, Gram'ma Funk
5	"Dope The Pope"	Sandeep Chowta	Sukhwinder Singh, Sowmya Raoh
6	"Punjabi 5-0"	The Dum Dum Project	The Dum Dum Project
7	"Zindabad"	Talvin Singh	Ravi Singh
8	"Ramp-age"	Sandeep Chowta	Sowmya Raoh
9	"Nuttin Happen"	D'Caro	D'Caro
10	"Seduction Saavariya"	Sandeep Chowta	Sonu Kakkar, Sunitha Sarathy
11	"Two Dons and a Bitch"	Sandeep Chowta	Sandeep Chowta
12	"It's Safe"	D'Caro	D'Caro
13	"The Crawford Market Feeling"	Sandeep Chowta	Sandeep Chowta
14	"Bhavani Dayani"	Jez Humble	Jez Humble
15	"Boom" (Dat Guy Remix)	Talvin Singh	Ila Arun

== Reception ==
The film was panned by critics. Taran Adarsh of IndiaFM.com rated the film 1 out of 5 stars and wrote, "On the whole, BOOM is all hype, no gas". Arindam Nag of Rediff.com rated the film the "Worst Film of the Year". Derek Elley of Variety called the film a "bust".

== Box office ==
The film performed very poorly at the box office. Its lifetime collections amounted to about Rs. 12 million. The producer of the film, Ayesha Shroff, had to sell off some of her assets as well her husband's (Jackie Shroff); the money owed to one financier alone amounted to Rs. 180 million. Shroff later indicated that his marriage suffered as a consequence, and that his relationship with his wife "was tough after Boom."

In June 2020, her son, actor Tiger Shroff, opened up about the impact of Boom's failure on his family. The actor said, "I remember how our furniture was sold off, one by one. Things I'd grown up seeing around us started disappearing. Then my bed went. I started to sleep on the floor. It was the worst feeling of my life."
