= Lucky Ali discography =

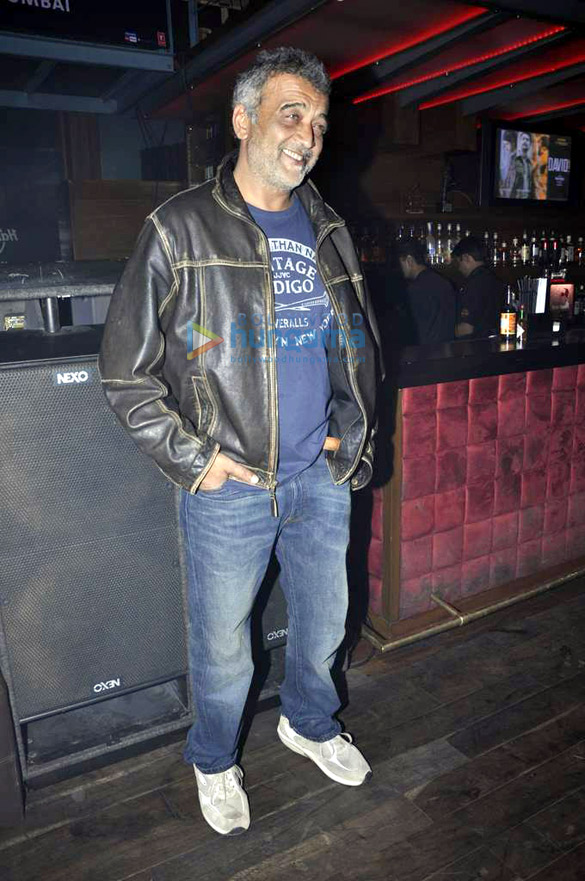
- Ali in 2013
- Studio albums: 6
- Compilation albums: 7
- Singles: 7
- Soundtrack: 18
- Concert Tour: 2
- Other Albums: 2

Lucky Ali is an Indian singer-songwriter, musician, composer, record producer, actor and philanthropist. He is best known for his soulful but strikingly simple ballad-style singing and melodious voice.

His discography contains 6 studio albums, 7 compilations, 7 singles, 18 soundtracks, 2 concert tour and 2 other albums (as a composer).

== Studio albums ==
Year	Album details	Track list
1996	Sunoh: Label: BMG Crescendo, Sony Music; Format: CD, Cassette, digital download	Oh Sanam; Sunoh; Pyaar ka Musafir; Aap Par Arz; Milegi Milegi; Tum Hi Se; Yeh Zameen; Jab Hum Chhote; Kya Mausam; Yeh Mumbai Nagariya
1998	Sifar: Label: Sony Music; Format: CD, Cassette, digital download	Teri Yaadein; Mil Jaan Se Kabhi; Dekha Hai Aise Bhi; Dil Aise Na Samajhna; Nahin Rakhta Dil Main Kuch; Tum Ho Wohi; Jheel Pe Jaise; Mausam; Baadalon Ki Gehraee; Suntey Hi Rehtey Hain
2001	Aks: Label: Sony BMG Music; Format: CD, Cassette, digital download	Tere Mere Saath; Kaisi Tanhai; Kitni Haseen Zindagi; Behti Nadi; Mehboob; Aks; Pyaar Ki Duniya; Tu Kaun Hai; Ek Na Ek Din; Sandesh
2001	Gori Teri Aankhen...: Label: Zee Records; Format: CD, Cassette, digital download	Gori Teri Aankhen...; Duniya Choomegi Tere Kadam; Chali Chali Man Chali; Dum Dum Diga Diga; Aaye Jabse (performed by Hariharan and Alka Yagnik : Music by Lucky Ali & Sajjad Ali); Dekho Ye Jo (performed by Remo Fernandes : Music by Lucky Ali & Sajjad Ali); Kuch Aisa Ho Who (performed by Kavita Krishnamurthy : Music by Lucky Ali & Sajjad Ali); Aji Zara Baat (performed by Kavita Krishnamurthy and Udit Narayan : Music by Lucky Ali & Sajjad Ali)
2004	Kabhi Aisa Lagta Hai: Label: T-Series Music; Format: CD, Cassette, digital download	Kabhi Aisa Lagta Hai; Teri Yaad Jab Aati Hai; Jabse Mili Tumse; Tanhaai Mein Basi; Ek Pal Mein Hai; Ye Dil Deewana Hai; Kabhi Aisa Lagta Hai(Instrumental); Thappa Thappi Chhuppa Chhuppi
2009	Xsuie: Label: Open; Format: digital download	Dil Gaye Jaa; Sea of Life; Yeh Zindagi; O Raahi; Khudahafiz; Rehne De; With You
2011	Raasta Man: Label: Lucky Ali Entertainment; Format: digital download	Yeh Zindagi; Tauba Tauba; Dil Gaaye Jaa; Rehne De; With You; Duniya Ka Samundar; Sayyaah; Main Kya Karoon; O Raahi; Main Tumhara Hi Rahoon; Khudahafiz

== Compilations ==
Year	Album details	Label
2002	Hitz Unlimited	Zee Records
2005	The Best of Lucky Ali	Sony Music
2007	Lucky Ali: His Greatest Hits	Sony BMG Music
2009	Get Lucky: Lucky Ali Greatest Hits	Sony BMG Music
2010	Bekarar	T-Series Music
Unknown	I Love Lucky Ali	Universal Music
Unknown	Lucky Ali: A Journey Through Music	Sony Music

== Soundtracks ==
Year	Song title	Film title	Music	Language
1978	"Walking And I Am Walking All Alone"	Ek Baap Chhe Bete	Rajesh Roshan	Hindi
1996	"Nasha Nasha"	Dushman Duniya Ka	Anu Malik	Hindi
1998	"Sunoh"	Bombay Boys	Lucky Ali	Hindi
1999	"Tu Kaun Hai"	Bhopal Express	Lucky Ali	Hindi
2000	"Na Tum Jaano Na Hum"	Kaho Naa... Pyaar Hai	Rajesh Roshan	Hindi
2000	"Ek Pal Ka Jeena"	Kaho Naa... Pyaar Hai	Rajesh Roshan	Hindi
2002	"Maut"	Kaante	Lucky Ali	Hindi
2002	"Aa Bhi Ja Aa Bhi Ja"	Sur-The Melody of Life	M.M. Keeravani	Hindi
2002	"Jaane Kya Dhoondta Hai"	Sur-The Melody of Life	M.M. Keeravani	Hindi
2002	"Tu Dil Ki Khushi"	Sur-The Melody of Life	M.M. Keeravani	Hindi
2002	"Khoya Hai Tune Jo Ae Dil"	Sur-The Melody of Life	M.M. Keeravani	Hindi
2002	"Aao Tumhen Ek Nayi Baat Bataon"	Sur-The Melody of Life	M.M. Keeravani	Hindi
2002	"Aa Bhi Ja Aa Bhi Ja"	My Brother…Nikhil	M.M. Keeravani	Hindi
2002	"Sote Sote"	Love at Times Square	Lucky Ali	Hindi
2002	"Ye Raste Ye"	Love at Times Square	Lucky Ali	Hindi
2003	"Secret of Success"	Boys	A. R. Rahman	Tamil
2003	"Kehte Kehte"	Chupke Se	Ranjit Barot	Hindi
2004	"Appudappudu"	Sye	M.M. Keeravani	Telugu
2004	"Hey Goodbye Nanba"	Aaytha Ezhuthu	A. R. Rahman	Tamil
2004	"Charumati I Love You"	Anand	K. M. Radha Krishnan	Telugu
2004	"Khuda Hafiz"	Yuva	A. R. Rahman	Hindi
2005	"Hum Bade Hue"	The Film	Samidha-Khalid	Hindi
2005	"Jaana Hai Jaana Hai"	Kasak	M.M. Keeravani	Hindi
2005	"Chandni Hai Khoyee Khoyee"	Kasak	M.M. Keeravani	Hindi
2005	"Yeh Zindagi"	Kasak	M.M. Keeravani	Hindi
2008	"Sooriyane"	Velli Thirai	G. V. Prakash Kumar	Tamil
2008	"Guththa Lakkadi"	Kaalai	G. V. Prakash Kumar	Tamil
2008	"Aahista Aahista"	Bachna Ae Haseeno	Vishal–Shekhar	Hindi
2008	"Nazar Mein Hai Chehra"	Good Luck!	Anu Malik	Hindi
2008	"Nazar Mein Hai Chehra (Hip-Hop Mix)"	Good Luck!	Anu Malik	Hindi
2009	"Kaisi Tanhai"	Road, Movie	Lucky Ali	Hindi
2009	"Dekha Hai Aise Bhi"	Road, Movie	Lucky Ali	Hindi
2010	"Bekarar"	Paathshaala	Hanif Sheikh	Hindi
2010	'Bekarar-Remix"	Paathshaala	Hanif Sheikh	Hindi
2010	"Hairat"	Anjaana Anjaani	Vishal–Shekhar	Hindi
2011	"Hosa Hosa Kanasu"	Dev S/O Mudde Gowda	Jassie Gift	Kannada
2013	"Vattoli"	Amen	Prashant Pillai	Malayalam
2015	"Safarnama"	Tamasha	A. R. Rahman	Hindi
2024	"Tu Hai Kahaan"	Do Aur Do Pyaar	The Local Train	Hindi
2025	"Dil Musafir"	Tu Meri Main Tera Main Tera Tu Meri	Vishal-Shekhar	Hindi
2026	"Muskura Do"	Drishyam: The Conclusion	Rochak Kohli	Hindi

== Singles ==
Year	Single	Album	Featuring artists	Label
1997	Anjaani Raahon Mein	Meri Jaan Hindustan		Shemaroo Entertainment
2001	Gori Teri Aankhen...	Gori Teri Aankhen...	Kavita Krishnamurthy	Zee Records
2002	Duniya Choomegi Tere Kadam	Gori Teri Aankhen...		Zee Records
2002	Chali Chali Man Chali	Gori Teri Aankhen...	Binjo	Zee Records
2009	Hey Goodbye Nanba	A.R. Rahman Hits Vol 1	Karthik, Shankar Mahadevan and Sunitha Sarathy	Sony Music
2010	Ek Pal Ka Jeena Recreated	DJ Aqeel Forever		Saregama
2026	"Tu Jaane Hai Kahaan"	—N/a	—N/a	Tips Music

== Concerts and tours ==
- Seher:Lucky Ali Concert (2006)
- Road Show Tour (for his album Raasta Man) (2011)
- The Carnival of Music (2012)
- Lucky Ali Band - Harley Davidson Biker Fest, Goa 2018
- Lucky Ali Band - 30 years of Lucky Ali - Safarnama Tour (2019 - 2020)
- Lucky Ali Band - Zomaland 2019
- Lucky Ali Band - Riders festival 2019
- Lucky Ali Band - Dubai Expo 2020
- Lucky Ali Band - India tour (2021 - 2022)
- Lucky Ali Band - Live at The Agenda, Dubai (2022)
- Lucky Ali Band - Live at Majuli Music Festival (2022)
- The Decades Tour (Journey through the decades) - New York, Denver, Dallas, Houston, San Jose, Los Angeles (USA 2026)

== Other albums ==
Year	Album details	Label
2001	Gori Teri Aankhen... (as a composer)	Zee Records
2005	Karaoke: Sing Along (instrumental)	Vale Music

== See also ==
- Lucky Ali videography
