= Mikey McCleary =

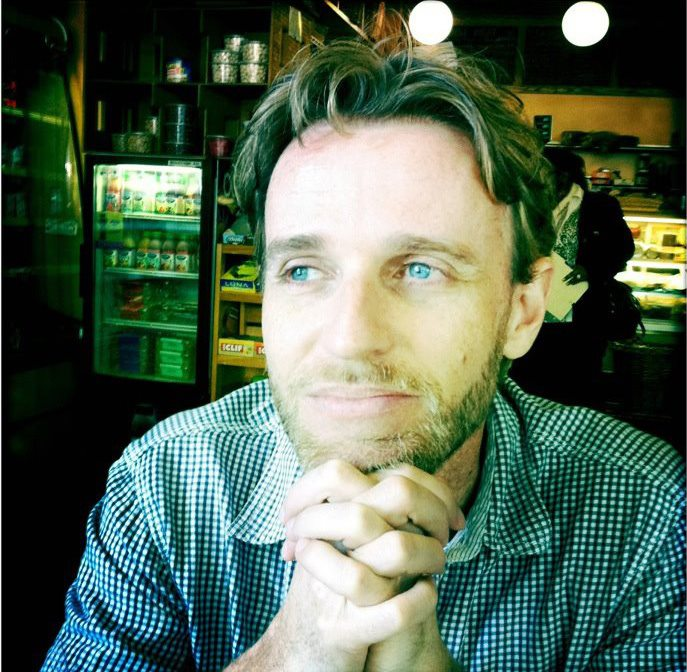
- Mikey McCleary

Background information
- Born: Michael McCleary; 8 January 1969 (age 57); Chennai, Tamil Nadu, India
- Origin: Auckland, New Zealand
- Occupations: Songwriter, composer, performer, producer, director
- Years active: 1993–present
- Website: mikeymccleary.com

Michael McCleary is a New Zealand songwriter, composer and producer based in Mumbai. He is known for Khoya Khoya Chand and Hawa Hawai from Shaitan, Neend Na Mujhko Aaye and Eena Meena Deeka from Shaandaar, Fifi from Bombay Velvet, O Lal Meri / Mast Kalandar from David and Dhak Dhak from Nautanki Saala. He has also released an album of full-length versions of some of his most popular advertisement jingles called TV Dinners.

== Personal life ==
Michael McCleary is a New Zealander who was born in Chennai, Tamil Nadu, India. He is married to writer and actress Diksha Basu.

== Career ==
McCleary began his career in the Indian industry with a collaboration with Lucky Ali. He was responsible for the music arrangement for the album Sunoh and several subsequent Lucky Ali albums and he has also worked regularly with A. R. Rahman.

He composed & produced all the tracks and background music for the film Waiting. In 2015 he won the Best Composer Award for the film Margarita with a Straw at the Asian Film Awards. He also created the background score for Dibakar Banerjee's 2012 political thriller Shanghai as well as contributing music for several other films including Shaitan, Kahaani, Love Sex aur Dhokha, Shaandaar, Bombay Velvet and Chennai Express. He composed the background score and a few tracks for Bejoy Nambiar's second film, David and then turned into a full-fledged Bollywood music director for Rohan Sippy's 2013 film, Nautanki Saala. He also created the background score and one track for the 2014 film, Shaadi Ke Side Effects.

Going by the stage name of The Bartender, McCleary has three albums released, Classic Bollywood: Shaken not Stirred (2011), B Seventy (2013) and Classic Bollywood with a Twist (2014).

TV Dinners was McCleary's debut album of English songs. Featuring his own vocals on half the album, it also features the singers Anushka Manchanda, Shalmali Kholgade, Monica Dogra and Mauli Dave. Five music videos directed by him have been released for tracks from this album.

In 2024, McCleary launched an all-girl Indian pop group, named W.i.S.H. The group consisted of Ri, Suchi, Zo and Sim. The group released its first song Lazeez on 1 March.

== Discography ==
=== Music albums ===
Artist	Position	Album
Lucky Ali	Music Arrangement	Sunoh; Sifar; Kabhi Aisa Lagta Hai; Aks; Xsuie; Raasta Man
A. R. Rahman	Co-Producer	Pray for Me Brother
The Bartender	Music Composer and producer	Classic Bollywood: Shaken not Stirred
The Bartender	Music Composer and producer	B Seventy
The Bartender	Music Composer and producer	Classic Bollywood with a Twist
Mikey McCleary	Music Composer and producer	TV Dinners

=== Films ===
Year	Film	Position	Track
2010	It's a Wonderful Afterlife	Song composer	Hai Mar Jawaan
2010	Love Sex aur Dhokha	Arranger	LSD Remix; Can't Hold it any Longer; Tu Gandi
2011	Shaitan	Music Revamped and Produced	Khoya Khoya Chand; Hawa Hawai
2012	Shanghai	Background score composer	
2012	Kahaani	Arranger	Piya tu Kaahe Rootha re
2013	David	Music Composer; Music Revamped and Produced; Background score composer – Hindi and Tamil versions	Out of Control; Mast Kalandar
2013	Nautanki Saala	Songs revamped and Produced; Song Composer; Background score composer	Dhak Dhak; Mera mann Kehne Laga; Tu Hi Tu; Draamebaaz; Dil Ki... Toh Lag Gayi; So Gaya yeh Jahan; Saadi Galli Aaja (unplugged)
2013	Chennai Express	Song Composer	Titli – Drum & Bass Remix
2014	Shaadi Ke Side Effects	Song composer; Background score composer	Ahista Ahista
2014	Angry Young Man	Song Composer	Ek Wajah Do
2014	Kuku Mathur Ki Jhand Ho Gayi	Song composer	Chop Chop
2014	Pizza	Song composer	Gimme Pizza!
2015	Bombay Velvet	Songs revamped and Produced	Mohobbat Buri Bimari; Fifi
2015	Margarita with a Straw	Song composer; Background score composer	Foreign Balamwa; Choone Chali Aasman; I Need a Man
2015	Shaandaar	Music revamped and Produced	Neend Na Mujhko aaye; Eena Meena Deeka
2015	Waiting	Song composer; Background score composer	Tu Hai Toh Main Hoon; Zara Zara; Got My Eyes on You; Waiting For you
2016	Befikre	Song producer with Vishal–Shekhar; Background score composer	"Nashe Si Chadh Gayi"; "Ude Dil Befikre"; "Je T'aime"; "You & Me"; "Labon Ka Karobaar"; "Khulke Dulke"; "Love Is a Dare" (Instrumental); "Nashe Si Chadh Gayi" (Remix)
2018	Blackmail	Background score composer along with Parth Parekh.	
2019	Gully Boy	Song Composer	"Jeene Mein Aaye Maza"
2019	The Sky Is Pink	Background score along with Pritam	
2022	Phone Bhoot	Song Composer	"Phone Bhoot Theme"
2022	Monica, O My Darling	Song Composer along with Achint Thakkar	"Yeh Ek Zindagi"
