= Hindi Medium =

2017 film directed by Saket Chaudhary

- Theatrical release poster
- Directed by: Saket Chaudhary
- Written by: Saket Chaudhary; Zeenat Lakhani; Amitosh Nagpal (Dialogues)
- Produced by: Dinesh Vijan; Bhushan Kumar
- Starring: Irrfan Khan; Saba Qamar; Dishita Sehgal; Deepak Dobriyal; Amrita Singh
- Cinematography: Laxman Utekar
- Edited by: A. Sreekar Prasad
- Music by: Songs: Sachin–Jigar; Guru Randhawa; Score: Amar Mohile
- Production companies: Maddock Films; T-Series
- Distributed by: AA Films
- Release date: 19 May 2017 (India)
- Running time: 132 minutes
- Country: India
- Language: Hindi
- Budget: ₹140 million
- Box office: est. ₹3.22 billion

Hindi Medium is a 2017 Indian Hindi-language comedy-drama film written and directed by Saket Chaudhary, and produced by Dinesh Vijan and Bhushan Kumar under their respective banners Maddock Films and T-Series. It stars Irrfan Khan, Saba Qamar, Dishita Sehgal, Deepak Dobriyal and Amrita Singh. Set in Delhi, the plot centres on a couple's struggle to get their daughter admitted to a prestigious English-medium school in order to rise in society. It is a remake of the Bengali film Ramdhanu.

The idea for the film was created by Chaudhary and his co-writer Zeenat Lakhani during the development of his previous film Shaadi Ke Side Effects (2014). It was shot in Chandni Chowk, Anand Lok, Karol Bagh, and Sangam Vihar. The film's soundtrack album was composed by the duo Sachin–Jigar, with lyrics by Priya Saraiya and Kumaar. The score was composed by Amar Mohile. Cinematography was handled by Laxman Utekar, and A. Sreekar Prasad edited the film.

Made on a production budget of ₹14 crore, Hindi Medium was released on 19 May 2017, and received a generally positive reception from the critics, with particular praise for the cast performances. The film grossed ₹3.22 billion (US$47.08 million) at the worldwide box office (mostly from China). At the 63rd Filmfare Awards, it won Best Film, and Best Actor for Khan. A spiritual successor, Angrezi Medium was released theatrically on 13 March 2020.

== Plot ==
Raj Batra is a wealthy and successful boutique owner who lives in the traditional Old Delhi neighbourhood of Chandni Chowk with his wife, Meeta, and their five-year-old daughter, Pia. Despite their comfortable lifestyle, the couple is deeply eager to secure Pia's admission into an elite, prestigious English-medium school in Delhi, believing it is the only way she can gain entry into high society. They set their sights on Delhi Grammar School, the top-ranked institution in the city. To satisfy the school's strict residency requirement, they leave their home and move to a luxurious villa in the upscale Vasant Vihar neighbourhood. They hire an admission consultant, Saumya, to coach them through the sophisticated interview process, but due to Raj and Meeta’s limited command of the English language, Pia’s application is ultimately rejected.

Desperate for a solution, Raj learns from one of his shop employees that his child secured a seat at a top school through the Right to education (RTE) quota, a government initiative reserved for underprivileged families. After a local broker explains how wealthy parents systematically illegally exploit this system, Raj and Meeta decide to fake their economic status. They relocate to the impoverished neighbourhood of Bharat Nagar for a month, adapting to a life of poverty to clear a background verification check. There, they form a close bond with their new neighbours, Shyam Prakash and Tulsi Prakash, a truly struggling couple who are desperately hoping their own son, Mohan, will get into Delhi Grammar School under the same quota. Unaware of the deception, Shyam and Tulsi generously teach the Batras how to survive on a meagre income, and Shyam even helps Raj secure a low-wage factory job. When the lottery results are announced, Pia successfully gains admission, but Mohan’s application is tragically rejected.

The Batras immediately move back to their affluent life in Vasant Vihar. Burdened by heavy guilt over taking a seat from a deserving child, Raj secretly makes a massive anonymous financial donation to renovate Mohan's poorly funded government school, equipping it with modern facilities and new textbooks. As Mohan begins thriving and speaking fluent English at the upgraded school, a grateful Shyam sets out to track down the anonymous benefactor to thank them. His search leads him directly to the upscale Vasant Vihar villa, where he discovers Raj's true identity and the elaborate scam they pulled in the slums. Devastated by the betrayal, Shyam storms off to expose Raj's fraud to Delhi Grammar School's principal, Lodha Singhania.

Raj and Meeta race to the school to intercept Shyam but arrive too late. However, inside the building, Shyam encounters little Pia, who greets him with pure affection. Moved by his bond with the little girl, Shyam chooses to protect her future and leaves without exposing the family to the principal. Witnessing Shyam's profound integrity only deepens Raj’s immense guilt. He goes directly into Principal Singhania's office, confesses to the entire fraud, and demands that Pia's admission be revoked so the seat can go to a deserving child. The elitist principal callously dismisses his concerns, stating that the school's reputation matters more than morality.

Refusing to comply with a broken system, Raj gatecrashes the school's packed Annual Day function. He takes the stage and delivers an impassioned speech criticising how the English language has become a tool of class discrimination in India, transforming education into a profit-driven business rather than a basic right. He leaves the stage to dead silence from the wealthy crowd, with only Meeta standing up to applaud him. Outside the gate, Raj and Meeta meet the principal of the Bharat Nagar Government School and proudly enroll Pia there, ensuring she grows up studying alongside Mohan.

== Cast ==
Credits adapted from Bollywood Hungama:

- Irrfan Khan as Raj Batra
  - Delzad Hiwale as young Raj
- Saba Qamar as Mita Malhotra Batra
  - Sanjana Sanghi as young Meeta
- Dishita Sehgal as Pia Batra
- Amrita Singh as Principal Lodha Singhania
- Deepak Dobriyal as Shyam Prakash
- Neelu Kohli as Geeta Malhotra
- Kiran Khoje as Sushila, Raaj & Meeta's house maid
- Rajeev Gupta as Batra Master, Raaj's father
- Sumit Gulati as Chhotu
- Mallika Dua as Dolly, a customer at Batra Fashion Studio
- Kulbir Kaur as Dolly's mother
- Charu Shankar as Maya
- Tillotama Shome as Saumya, a consultant
- Rajesh Sharma as MLA
- Taran Bajaj as Teashop owner, the man who settled Raaj & Meeta's house in Bharat Nagar
- Ankur Jain as news reader
- Swati Daas as Tulsi Prakash, Shyam's wife
- Neha Dhupia as Aarti Suri, Kabir's wife (special appearance)
- Sanjay Suri as Kabir Suri, Aarti's husband (special appearance)
- Angshuman Nandi as Mohan Prakash, Shyam & Tulsi's son
- Jason as Ayaan Suri, Kabir & Aarti's son
- Anurag Arora as Mr. Kumar, Hindi Teacher at Delhi Grammar School
- Jaspal Sharma as Raj's neighbour
- Ekta singh as Raj's neighbour
- Taniskaa Sanghvi as a student from Bharat Nagar Government School (Special Appearance in the song “Ek Jindari”)
- Guru Randhawa as himself (Special Appearance in the song “Suit Suit”)
- Arjun as himself (Special Appearance in the song “Suit Suit”)

== Production ==
Made on a production budget of ₹14 crore, Hindi Medium was produced by Vijan of Maddock Films and Bhushan Kumar of T-Series. The film was directed by Chaudhary, his third after romantic comedy films Pyaar Ke Side Effects (2006) and Shaadi Ke Side Effects (2014). He came up with the idea of making a film about India's education system with his co-writer Zeenat Lakhani during the development of the latter film. They found the idea too extensive to include in Shaadi Ke Side Effects, so after its release, they decided to incorporate the idea into a separate film. Stating the reason to make Hindi Medium, Chaudhary said, "The subject is so relevant. We realised that today irrespective of the background of the parent, they still want to have the best education for the children."

Pre-production work began after the release of Shaadi Ke Side Effects. Chaudhary began working on the story at that time, and he chose Delhi as the film's key location. The production crew consisted primarily of people Chaudhary had worked with on Pyaar Ke Side Effects and Shaadi Ke Side Effects, with the exception of production designer Mustafa Stationwala—they are editor A. Sreekar Prasad; dialogue writer Amitosh Nagpal; and cinematographer Laxman Utekar. The score was composed by Amar Mohile.

On 29 May 2016, News18 reported the casting of Saba Qamar in the film, which marked her Bollywood debut. Khan had recommended the casting of Qamar to the makers of the film. He said, "When I saw her YouTube videos, I recommended her to the director and producer and they really liked her". Speaking about her role, Qamar said, "I play a person who didn't get an opportunity to fulfil her dreams so she comes up with a scheme about giving the daughter a life that she didn't have". Khan commented that he had accepted the role as it tackled the realistic subject of the challenges of obtaining a good education in India.

Qamar arrived in Mumbai from Pakistan in July 2016, and the film's principal photography began in the same month. The film was shot in Chandni Chowk, Anand Lok, Karol Bagh, and Sangam Vihar. The shooting was completed in October 2016. A song sequence was also filmed in Georgia. Qamar commented that she enjoyed working with Khan, and felt safe while shooting in Delhi. In the same interview with Pakistani newspaper Dawn, she commented that her experience wasn't affected by the nationalist far-right political party Maharashtra Navnirman Sena's hostility towards Pakistan at the time.

== Soundtrack ==
Hindi Medium's soundtrack consists of two original compositions: "Hoor" and "Ek Jindari", which were produced by Sachin–Jigar. The songs were written by Priya Saraiya and Kumaar, whereas Atif Aslam and Taniskaa Sanghvi, rendered the vocals. In addition to the original tracks, the makers recreated two songs: "Suit Suit", written and sung by Guru Randhawa and Arjun and composed by Randhawa and Rajat Nagpal, and "Oh Ho Ho Ho", composed by Sukhbir and Abhijit Vaghani, sung by Sukhbir, rapped by Ikka Singh and written by Kumaar. The rights to the album of the film were acquired by T-Series, and it was released on 21 April 2017.

== Release ==
The film was initially scheduled to release on 12 May 2017, but was pushed back a week, thereby clashing with Half Girlfriend, scheduled for release on the same date. Hindi Medium was declared 'tax-free' in Gujarat, Maharashtra, Madhya Pradesh and Delhi.

In February 2018, following the success of Dangal (2016) and Secret Superstar (2017) in China, it was announced that Hindi Medium was to be released in China. Hindi Medium was released in China on 4 April 2018 to coincide with the Qingming Festival. The film's Chinese title is 起跑线 (Qi Pao Xian), which means The Starting Line.

=== Controversy ===
The makers of the Bengali film Ramdhanu (2014), directed by the duo Nandita Roy and Shiboprosad Mukherjee, had launched a copyright case against Hindi Medium, claiming that the storyline was similar to their film. In response to this, Chaudhary said "We have researched our script over a year and it is based on original material. I would request everyone involved to not rush to a judgement without ascertaining the facts. And the facts can easily be confirmed by watching the film." Roy and Mukherjee later withdrew their case.

== Critical reception ==
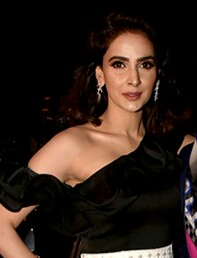
Qamar (pictured) and Khan received praise for their performances

Hindi Medium received a generally positive reception from critics, with particular praise for Khan's and Qamar's performances.

Rohit Bhatnagar of Deccan Chronicle called the film a "masterpiece" and praised Khan's and Qamar's acting. Rachit Gupta of Filmfare rated the film 4.5 out of 5 stars and said that it was a "refreshingly funny and brilliantly insightful film on parenting and education." Madhureeta Mukherjee of The Times of India highlighted the script, and the comedic elements of the film as its strengths. Rohit Vats of Hindustan Times giving 3.5 stars out of 5 stars, commented that "Khan asks the viewers to take a stand against faulty Indian education system". Samrudhi Ghosh of India Today gave 3 out of 5 stars, praising Khan's and Qamar's performances, said "Hindi Medium may use over-dramatised events to make its message hit home, but in spite of its hiccups, the film is not bogged down because of the performances and the humour". Smrity Sharma of India.com rated the film 2.5 out of 5 stars, and wrote: "Decent story, humour, a few heart tugging moments and effortless performances by Irrfan Khan, Saba Qamar and Deepak Dobriyal make the movie watchable." Shubhra Gupta of The Indian Express giving 2 out of 5 stars, praised Khan's acting however felt that the writing was "flat", and that some of the supporting characters were "more caricature than real".

Hindi Medium received a generally positive reception from critics outside of India. A reviewer for Time Out gave it 4 out of 5 stars: "With all its merits, though, the film stumbles near the end with its overly sentimental conclusion." The reviewer concluded that "the film is one of the best Bollywood films". James Marsh of South China Morning Post rated it 3.5 stars out of 5 stars, calling it "a classical comedy of manners full of humour and playful performances". Sadaf Siddique of Dawn observed: "Chaudhary gets full marks for novelty, he fails to adequately flesh his ideas out".

Rajeev Masand of CNN-IBN gave 2.5 stars out of 5, commenting "Despite its shortcomings, the film is never unwatchable and benefits enormously from a winning performance by Irrfan Khan who makes his every moment on screen count. From his hilarious wooing of a mother-daughter pair of potential customers at his shop in the film's first half to his earnest amends on discovering his conscience late into the final act, he has you eating out of his palm. For Irrfan alone, Hindi Medium may be worth a watch."

== Box office ==
The film emerged as a sleeper hit at the box office. Its worldwide gross was ₹1.09 billion (US$16.74 million) by July 2017. Within three days of its April 2018 release in China, Hindi Medium crossed ₹1 billion (US$14.62 million) at the Chinese box office, crossing the ₹2 billion (US$29.24 million) mark worldwide, becoming Khan's highest-grossing Hindi film, surpassing his 2013 release The Lunchbox. By 16 April 2018, Hindi Medium had crossed the ₹3 billion (US$43.87 million) mark worldwide, becoming one of the top 20 highest-grossing Indian films at the time.

=== Domestic ===
Hindi Medium collected ₹28.1 million (US$431,500.45) on its opening day. It released on the same day as the much bigger budget film, Half Girlfriend (2017), which earned ₹103 million (US$1.58 million) on the first day. Gradually, the film turned to be more successful than the former. After one week, the film grossed ₹252 million (US$3.87 million) at the box office. The film grossed ₹967 million (US$14.85 million) during its lifetime run in Indian theatres. It was one of 2017's top ten most commercially successful Hindi films in India.

=== Overseas ===
The film grossed ₹143 million (US$2.2 million) overseas in 2017. Following its April 2018 release in China, the film crossed ₹2 billion (US$29.24 million) overseas, becoming the seventh Indian film to cross the $30 million mark at the overseas box office. It also surpassed the overseas gross of 2018's highest-grossing Indian film Padmaavat.

=== China ===
On its opening day in China, on 4 April 2018, the film grossed ₹221 million (US$3.23 million). Hindi Medium surpassed Dangal (2016) and Bajrangi Bhaijaan (2015) to have the second highest opening day for an Indian film in China, behind only Secret Superstar (2018). The film's opening three-day gross was ₹1.02 billion (US$14.91 million).

The film's success is attributed to strong word-of-mouth, helped by a 9.1 rating at the Chinese ticketing website Maoyan, as well as Khan's recognition among Chinese audiences from international films such as Jurassic World, The Amazing Spider-Man, and Life of Pi. The film grossed ₹2.23 billion (US$32.61 million) during its lifetime run at the Chinese box office. This made it the fourth highest-grossing Indian film in China (after Dangal, Secret Superstar and Bajrangi Bhaijaan), until it was surpassed by the 2019 release of Andhadhun (2018) in China.

== Awards ==
At the 63rd Filmfare Awards, the film garnered six nominations, winning for Best Film and Best Actor for Khan. Chaudhary won Best Director and Khan won for Best Actor at the 19th IIFA Awards. It received six nominations at the Zee Cine Awards.

Award	Date of ceremony	Category	Recipients	Result	Ref.
Filmfare Awards	20 January 2018	Best Film	Hindi Medium	Won	
Filmfare Awards	20 January 2018	Best Actor	Irrfan Khan	Won	
Filmfare Awards	20 January 2018	Best Actor (Critics)	Irrfan Khan	Nominated	
Filmfare Awards	20 January 2018	Best Actress	Saba Qamar	Nominated	
Filmfare Awards	20 January 2018	Best Director	Saket Chaudhary	Nominated	
Filmfare Awards	20 January 2018	Best Supporting Actor	Deepak Dobriyal	Nominated	
International Indian Film Academy Awards	22–24 June 2018	Best Film	Hindi Medium	Nominated	
International Indian Film Academy Awards	22–24 June 2018	Best Director	Saket Chaudhary	Won	
International Indian Film Academy Awards	22–24 June 2018	Best Actor	Irrfan Khan	Won	
International Indian Film Academy Awards	22–24 June 2018	Best Supporting Actor	Deepak Dobriyal	Nominated	
Mirchi Music Awards	28 January 2018	Music Composer of The Year	Sachin–Jigar for "Hoor"	Nominated	
Screen Awards	2 December 2017	Best Actor	Irrfan Khan	Won	
Zee Cine Awards	30 December 2017	Best Film (Viewer's Choice)	Hindi Medium	Nominated	
Zee Cine Awards	30 December 2017	Best Film (Jury's Choice)	Hindi Medium	Nominated	
Zee Cine Awards	30 December 2017	Best Director	Saket Chaudhary	Nominated	
Zee Cine Awards	30 December 2017	Best Actor – Male	Irrfan Khan	Nominated	
Zee Cine Awards	30 December 2017	Best Actor in a Supporting Role – Male	Deepak Dobriyal	Nominated	
Zee Cine Awards	30 December 2017	Best Screenplay	Saket Chaudhary, Zeenat Lakhani	Nominated	

== Sequel ==
After the success of Hindi Medium, a sequel to the film was planned. Regarding the success of the film, producer Vijan told Mid-Day, "The response we have got is phenomenal. The entire unit of Hindi Medium, including Irrfan and Saba, who look cool as a couple on-screen, should be repeated in a film. There is definitely scope for a sequel. We would certainly explore it." On 24 January 2018, Vijan confirmed the sequel to Times Now. He said, "We have just finished typing the second part", with "Just finishing touches are being put", however, "I think you will have to wait for an official announcement for that."

On 30 March 2019, it was announced that Kareena Kapoor has been added to the cast of the sequel to play the role of a police officer and filming will start from April. On 5 April, the sequel's title was announced as Angrezi Medium and filming began in Udaipur. This was completed in July. On 17 February 2020, the film's release date was changed to 13 March 2020 from the earlier release date of 20 March. This film marked Irrfan Khan's final film before his death on 29 April 2020.

== See also ==
- List of Bollywood films of 2017
