= Chase Every Dream =

Single by Mikey McCleary feat. Anushka Manchanda

from the album TV Dinners
- Released: June 16, 2014
- Recorded: December 2010- May 2014
- Studio: Ribbit Studios (Mumbai, India)
- Genre: Pop
- Length: 3:09
- Label: Sony Music India
- Songwriters: Mikey McCleary, Senthil Kumar
- Producer: Mikey McCleary

Music video
- "Chase Every Dream" on YouTube

"Chase Every Dream" is the first single to be released off Mikey McCleary's album TV Dinners, which features full song versions of some of the most popular advertising jingles he has composed. It was originally a 1-minute track Mikey composed for a Levi's advertising campaign in December 2010. Released as a single on June 16, 2014, it is the 3rd track on TV Dinners.

The music video for this song has been written and directed by Mikey and features celebrities such as Ranveer Singh, Kalki Koechlin, Shraddha Kapoor, Shaan, Sapna Bhavnani, Gabriella Demetriades and Anushka Manchanda along with several other people from around Mumbai.

== Background ==
"Chase Every Dream" was originally composed in December 2010 for a Levi's Curve ID advertisement that featured 3 girls taking a road-trip and then opening a restaurant on a beach. The ad left a lot of people asking for the full song and the name of the artist who had composed the song. Mikey chose to include this track on TV Dinners since it was a tune people would find familiar, but didn't have any lyrics specifically connecting the song with the original brand.

== Music video ==
The song "Chase Every Dream" is about believing in yourself and making your dreams happen regardless of how difficult or crazy they are. Since the song evokes an inspirational feeling, Mikey wanted to make an uplifting video featuring many diverse people. "I've always enjoyed the idea of many people, all lip syncing to one song. It's a simple concept, with a mixture of celebs, friends of mine and also random people we met on the streets of Mumbai" says Mikey.
The video features well-known Bollywood actors such as Ranveer Singh, Kalki Koechlin and Shraddha Kapoor singing along to the song. Also seen are singers Shaan and Rachel Varghese, well-known hair-stylist and reality TV star Sapna Bhavnani, model-actress Gabriella Demetriades (who is also seen in Mikey's music video for 'I Don't Know Where i'm Going'), and actor-voiceover artist Ninad Kamat. The music video begins and ends with Mikey strumming a guitar and Anushka Manchanda singing along on a roof-top. The music video also features several other people from around Mumbai including an auto rickshaw driver, tourists, expats, kids and students.

== Trivia ==
This video was shot at various places in Mumbai including Colaba Causeway and Bandra Fort. Mikey's rooftop scenes were shot on top of a building in Bandra.

Ranveer Singh gave his shot in his vanity van, while Kalki Koechlin was shot in her house. Shraddha Kapoor was shot in Mikey's studio.

Several people seen in the video were shot on the streets of Colaba and Bandra including Sapna Bhavnani who was shot in a lane in Bandra village.

== Credits ==
=== Music ===
- Arrangement, Composition, Production: Mikey McCleary with assistance from Gaurav Godkhindi
- All instruments played by: Mikey McCleary
- Vocals: Anushka Manchanda
- Lyrics: Senthil Kumar & Mikey McCleary
- Mixing: Mikey McCleary with assistance from Gaurav Godkhindi
- Mastering: Mikey McCleary with assistance from Gaurav Godkhindi

=== Video ===
- Director: Mikey McCleary
- Editor: Mikey McCleary, Harshvir Oberai
- DOP: Harshvir Oberai, Aravind Sundar
- Production: Parth Parekh, Ankita Roy, Aravind Sundar

=== Design ===
- Cover Image Design: Aravind Sundar
