= Muzammil Ibrahim =

Indian actor

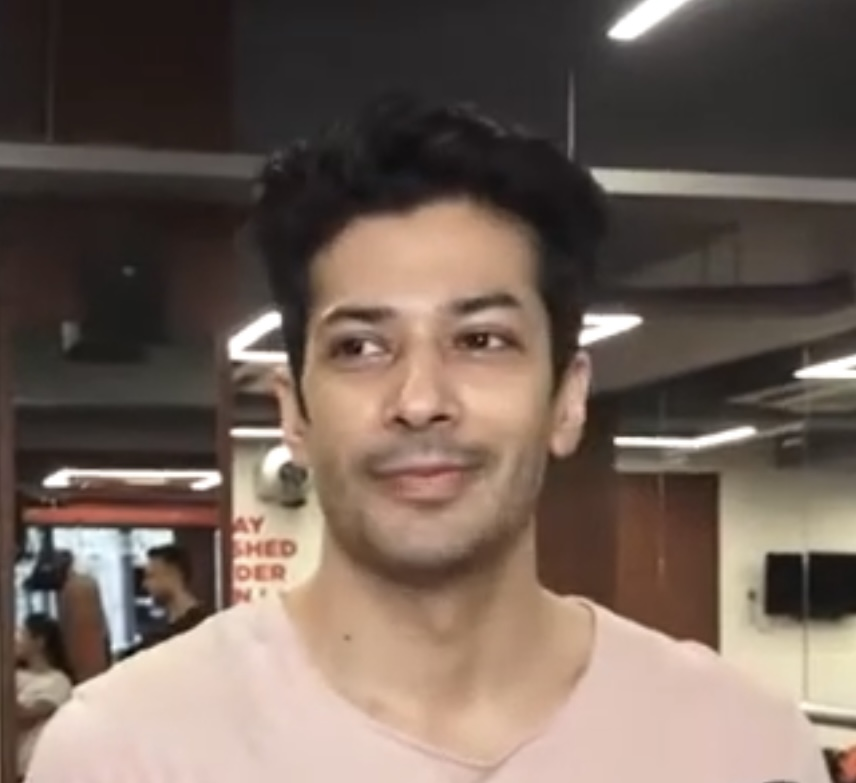
- Ibrahim in 2022
- Born: August 25, 1986 (age 40); Srinagar, Jammu and Kashmir, India
- Occupations: Actor; model
- Years active: 2003–present

Muzammil Ibrahim is an Indian actor and model who works in Hindi films.

== Early and personal life ==
Muzammil Ibrahim was born on 25 August 1986 in Srinagar, Kashmir, India. His father was an army contractor and he got his early education in English in Lal Chowk's Tyndale Biscoe School, a missionary school. In 2003, his family moved to Mumbai, following the Kashmir insurgency.

In 1994, while Ibrahim was eight years old, he had received the Jeevan Raksha Padak for saving his schoolmate from drowning. Similarly, in 2008 he received the Godfrey Philips Bravery Award for saving a British woman from drowning in the Arabian Sea in Goa.

== Career ==
=== Model ===
In 2003, Ibrahim won the Gladrags Manhunt and Megamodel Contest whilst pursuing mechanical engineering from the Jamia Millia Islamia in Delhi. He received several major Indian modeling awards, including Best Male Model from The Times of India and The Hindustan Times for three consecutive years (2004–2006). He also won Zoom’s Most Glamorous Male Model award in 2005 and the Apex Award for Most Stylish Male Model the same year. He has featured in various music videos, most notably "Pardesiya" alongside Rakhi Sawant and "Kabhi Aisa Lagta Hai" by Lucky Ali.

=== Actor ===
Ibrahim has stated that he has been interested in acting since childhood, his early exposure to acting having come through his mother’s uncle, a regional playwright and poet in Kashmir, who involved him in theatrical productions from a young age. He recalls performing for up to ten hours a day, moving from one school to another during his childhood.

In 2007, Ibrahim made his acting debut as the lead in Dhokha, an action thriller film directed by Pooja Bhatt. Khalid Mohamed of the Hindustan Times called him "promising... [with] strong screen presence".

== Filmography ==
Year	Title	Role	Notes
2007	Dhokha	ACP Zaid Ahmed Khan	
2009	Horn 'Ok' Pleassss	Ajay	
2012	Will You Marry Me?	Nikhil Ahuja	
2020-present	Special Ops	Avinash	Television series
2027	Love & War	TBA	Filming

== Music videos ==
Year	Title	Album	Artist	Ref.
2004	"Kabhi Aisa Lagta Hai"	"Kabhi Aisa Lagta Hai"	Lucky Ali	
