= Gori Teri Aankhen... =

Studio album by Lucky Ali
- Released: 4 September 2001 (Audio Cassette); 6 September 2001 (Audio CD)
- Genre: World, Folk
- Length: 40:15
- Label: Zee Records

Lucky Ali chronology
Aks (2001)	Gori Teri Aankhen... (2001)	Kabhi Aisa Lagta Hai (2004)

Gori Teri Aankhen... is a studio album by Lucky Ali. The music of the album was composed by Lucky Ali. The album featured various artists. Lucky featured in 3 out of 8 songs of the album.

== Track listing ==
The album consists of eight songs:

- Gori Teri Aankhen...
- Duniya Choomegi Tere Kadam
- Chali Chali Man Chali
- Aaye Jabse Woh Meri Zindagi Mein
- Dekho Yeh Jo Meri Hai Ada
- Kuch Aisa Ho Woh Meri Zindagi
- Aji Zara Baat Samjho Na
- Dum Dum Diga Diga

== See also ==
- Lucky Ali discography
