= TV Dinners (album) =

- Album cover

Studio album by Mikey McCleary
- Released: 23 July 2014
- Recorded: 2010–2014; Ribbit Studios (Mumbai, India)
- Genre: Pop
- Length: 33:27
- Label: Sony Music India
- Producers: Mikey McCleary ("If You Feel" – Mikey McCleary & Ashutosh Phatak)

Singles from TV Dinners
- 1. "Chase Every Dream" Released: 16 June 2014; 2. "I Don't Know Where I'm Going" Released: 2 July 2014

TV Dinners is Mikey McCleary's debut album of English songs. It consists of tracks that McCleary composed and wrote for major TV advertising brands like Vodafone, Levi's, Audi, Titan and Lakmé. He has extended these 45-second jingles into full songs by adding new composition and lyrics so that instead of sounding like jingles, they sound like tracks from various artists that were placed in TV ad films. Featuring McCleary's vocals on half the album, it also features the singers Anushka Manchanda, Shalmali Kholgade, Monica Dogra and Mauli Dave.

== Background ==
The idea of turning a jingle into a full song came about when McCleary found many people online asking for the full song for many of the jingles he had composed. A lot of people thought that these jingles were existing songs that had been placed in TV ads. He chose the jingles that were most popular and that didn't have any lyrics specifically connecting the song with the original brand. TV Dinners is full of familiar tunes but none of the songs sound like extended jingles, they sound like songs from different artists.

== Music videos ==
To complement the songs on this album, McCleary has conceptualised, written and directed five music videos, "Chase Every Dream", "I Don't Know Where I'm Going", "The Little Things You Do", "Open Book", and "The World Is Our Playground"

Each of these music videos has a unique concept that relates to the theme of the song. They have been shot using innovative techniques such as using a GoPro camera, shooting underwater etc. The videos have featured celebrities such as Ranveer Singh, Kalki Koechlin, Shraddha Kapoor, Shaan, Sarah-Jane Dias, Sapna Bhavnani, Gabriella Demetriades and Anushka Manchanda. They have been shot in locations as varied as Mumbai, Goa and New York City.

== Track listing ==
No.	Title	Singer	Length
1.	"The Little Things You Do"	Anushka Manchanda	2:43
2.	"The World Is Our Playground" (Saxophone: Rhys Sebastian D'Souza)	Mikey McCleary	3:11
3.	"Chase Every Dream" (Lyrics: Senthil Kumar & Mikey McCleary)	Anushka Manchanda	3:08
4.	"I Don't Know Where I'm Going" (Organ Solo: Ramon Ibrahim)	Mikey McCleary	3:55
5.	"Just A Little Crush"	Shalmali Kholgade	3:00
6.	"Oh I Feel Wonderful"	Mikey McCleary	3:55
7.	"Open Book"	Mauli Dave	3:02
8.	"If I Go Mad"	Mikey McCleary	4:04
9.	"You Got Me" (Saxophone: Rhys Sebastian D'Souza)	Shalmali Kholgade	2:50
10.	"If You Feel" (Music and lyrics: Mikey McCleary and Ashutosh Phatak)	Monica Dogra	3:39
Total length:			33:27

- All music composed and produced by Mikey McCleary, except where noted.
- All lyrics by Mikey McCleary, except where noted.
- All instruments played by Mikey McCleary, except where noted.

== Album credits ==
=== Personnel ===
- Mikey McCleary – Vocals, all instruments
- Shalmali Kholgade – Vocals
- Anushka Manchanda – Vocals
- Monica Dogra – Vocals
- Mauli Dave – Vocals
- Rhys Sebastian D'Souza – Saxophone
- Ramon Ibrahim – Organ

=== Production ===
- Producers: Mikey McCleary, Ashutosh Phatak with assistance from Gaurav Godkhindi
- Mixing: Mikey McCleary with assistance from Gaurav Godkhindi
- Mastering: Mikey McCleary with assistance from Gaurav Godkhindi

=== Design ===
- Physical CD artwork and design: Amol Dalvi
