= Karanji =

Karanji may refer to:

- Karanji (film), a 2009 Kannada-language Indian film
- Karanji Lake, a lake in the Mysore city of Karnataka, India
- Karanji, Maharashtra, a village, List of villages in Pathardi taluka, in Pathardi taluka, Ahmednagar district, Maharashtra State, India
- Fried sweet dumplings made of wheat flour and stuffed with dry or moist coconut delicacies. Also called gujiya
