= Befikre =

2016 Indian film by Aditya Chopra

- Theatrical release poster
- Directed by: Aditya Chopra
- Written by: Aditya Chopra
- Dialogues by: Sharat Katariya
- Produced by: Aditya Chopra
- Starring: Ranveer Singh; Vaani Kapoor
- Cinematography: Kaname Onoyama
- Edited by: Namrata Rao
- Music by: Songs: Vishal–Shekhar; Background Score: Mikey McCleary
- Production company: Yash Raj Films
- Distributed by: Yash Raj Films
- Release date: 9 December 2016 (India)
- Running time: 132 minutes
- Country: India
- Language: Hindi
- Budget: ₹70 crores
- Box office: ₹103 crores

Befikre (transl. 'Carefreeness') is a 2016 Indian Hindi-language romantic comedy film written, directed, and produced by Aditya Chopra under his banner Yash Raj Films. It stars Ranveer Singh and Vaani Kapoor in the lead roles. The film was shot over a period of 50 days in Paris and Mumbai. It released on 9 December 2016, and received mixed-to-negative reviews from critics.

The film's soundtrack was composed by Vishal–Shekhar with the film score composed by Mikey McCleary. This is Chopra's only directoral venture not featuring Shah Rukh Khan, as well as his last to date.

== Plot ==
In Paris, Befikre starts with a nasty fight between Dharam Gulati (Ranveer Singh) and Shyra Gill (Vaani Kapoor), which leads to a sudden break-up. Shyra leaves Dharam, and goes to her parents' house, asking them to let her in as long as they don't ask any questions about Dharam or their break-up. Dharam hails from Karol Bagh, Delhi, and is a stand-up comedian working in his friend, Mehra's (Aru Krishansh Verma) doomed restaurant. The night of his break-up, he mocks people in relationships and praises being single.

The film then flashes back to the time when Dharam first came to Paris in search of work and adventure. To his surprise, he shares his room with a girl who is a lesbian. Mehra takes him to a party where he meets and hooks up with the fun-loving Shyra, a tourist guide, whose parents are Indian, but who was born and raised in France. He later asks Shyra out on a date. She promises to go out on a date with him if he accepts her dare to slap a police officer. He does so, and they start dating. During their relationship, they keep giving crazy dares to each other. Eventually, the couple decides to enter a live-in relationship and Dharam meets Shyra's parents, who are chefs in their own Indian restaurant. After many misunderstandings and fights (including the one shown at the beginning of the film), Shyra moves out and moves back in with her family.

In the present, Dharam is still mocking his broken relationship at the same restaurant. During the months that follow, Dharam and Shyra keep meeting accidentally, showing that they still haven't gotten over each other and miss each other's company. They finally decide to become friends again and celebrate their breakup anniversary on the Pont des Arts Bridge. They swear never to fall in love with each other again and tie a breakup lock.

Shyra starts dating Aney (Arrmaan Ralhan), an investment banker whereas Dharam starts dating Christine (Julie Ordon), a French model. They go for the holiday outside Paris. After coming back to Paris, Aney proposes to Shyra. Shyra asks Aney to give her time to think about it and asks Dharam for his advice at Place des Vosges Park. While Dharam is afraid to lose Shyra, he still advises her to marry Aney and be happy. Shyra accepts the proposal, while Dharam secretly feels miserable.

Dharam and Shyra both remain good friends until one day, when they get into a heated discussion when he tells her that he and Christine have decided to marry to which Shyra does not approve and she and Dharam become rivals. Soon, Dharam and Christine both decide to marry each other.

Knowing that both Dharam and Shyra are going to marry different people they still are emotionally attached to each other. They do a face-off dance at the 'Sangeet' ceremony, which leads to their reconciliation as friends. Dharam secretly tells Shyra that he is not ready for marriage and also wants to stop it. During the conversation, both start to realise they still love each other.

On the wedding day, Dharam, however, manages to stop the wedding and tells Shyra that he truly loves and cannot be a friend of her anymore. Eventually after a lengthy fight at the wedding where both leave their respective partners, Dharam and Shyra run away from their wedding ceremony. Dharam dares Shyra to marry him, which she accepts.

The film ends with Dharam and Shyra's wedding.

== Cast ==
- Ranveer Singh as Dharam Gulati, a Delhi guy who moved to Paris to pursue a career as a stand-up comedian.
- Vaani Kapoor as Shyra Gill, a French tourist guide of Indian descent – born and raised in Paris.
- Arrmaan Ralhan as Anay, an investment banker who wants to marry Shyra.
- Julie Ordon as Christine, Dharam's French girlfriend.
- Akarsh Khurana as Joginder "Jogi" Gill, Shyra's father
- Ayesha Raza Mishra as Juhi Gill, Shyra's mother
- Aru Krishansh Verma as Mehra
- Elisa Bachir Bey as Nathalie

== Production ==
=== Development ===
The film was announced by Yash Raj Films in September 2015 as Chopra's directorial comeback, scheduled for a December 2016 release. In October 2015, it was announced that Ranveer Singh and Vaani Kapoor would be cast in the lead roles.

In December 2015, Yash Raj Films announced that the songs of the film will be composed by Vishal–Shekhar, and the lyrics will be written by Jaideep Sahni, both of whom would return to collaborate with the banner after roughly 9 years.

In March 2016, there were reports of Singh facing scheduling conflicts with Yash Raj Films after he was signed by Excel Entertainment for Zoya Akhtar's next directorial film scripted by Farhan Akhtar and Reema Kagti. Singh had earlier allotted both Q2 and Q3 of Fiscal 2016 to Befikre (including its Paris and Mumbai schedules). Akhtar's coming-of-age, travel-diary Project requires Singh to film across all the 29 states of India, in the same period.

=== Filming ===
The film was shot extensively in Paris. It was filmed in a period of 50 days.

Befikre was released across 2900 screens: 2100 screens in the Domestic (Indian) market and another additional 800 screens in the International market.

== Reception ==
=== Critical response ===
Befikre generally received mixed to negative reviews from critics. The Times of India rated the film 3 out of 5 stars and said, "Befikre has some honest, funny moments and the attempt to upgrade the genre is apparent, but you don't come away with anything new." Shubhra Gupta from The Indian Express gave the film 1.5 out of 5 stars and commented, "Befikre ticks practically every single box which constitutes the Yashraj canon. It's all there, and yet, Befikre never quite rises above its shiny surface. In its best moments, it has sparkle, but those few and far between; in the rest, it stays bland and familiar." Rajeev Masand also gave the film 1.5 out of 5 stars and stated, "What the film lacks is genuine feeling. Yes, even the frothiest of rom-coms need something real to keep you invested in its characters. I’m going with one-and-a-half out of five for Befikre. Aditya Chopra may have made one of Hindi cinema's most enduring love stories, but this is a soufflé that sinks like a stone." Raja Sen rated the film 1.5 out of 5 stars and opined, "At a point when our mainstream cinema is beginning to grow up, Befikre is painfully childish drivel that proves to be a maddening waste of time. It starts out shrill, turns predictable, and ends up chaotic. To use the language of the youth Aditya Chopra is attempting to speak, let's call it Befi-cray-cray."

=== Box office ===
==== India ====
The film collected ₹103.6 million (equivalent to ₹160 million or US$1.7 million in 2026) on opening day becoming the tenth-highest opening Bollywood film of 2016. The film became Ranveer Singh's fifth highest opener, following Padmaavat, Ram Leela, Gunday, and Bajirao Mastani. Befikre collected ₹116 million (equivalent to ₹180 million or US$1.9 million in 2026) and ₹124.7 million (equivalent to ₹200 million or US$2.1 million in 2026) on the second and third days after its release, respectively, taking its first domestic weekend net collection to ₹344.3 million (equivalent to ₹540 million or US$5.8 million in 2026) and became the eleventh-highest domestic weekend collecting Bollywood film of 2016. In the next four days, the film collected ₹143.2 million (equivalent to ₹220 million or US$2.4 million in 2026) taking its first domestic week's net collection to total of ₹487.5 million (equivalent to ₹760 million or US$8.2 million in 2026). Befikre became the twelfth-highest first-domestic-week-collecting Bollywood film of the year. The film's net collection in India is ₹602.6 million (equivalent to ₹950 million or US$10 million in 2026) becoming the sixteenth-highest net collecting Bollywood film in India of 2016, while it grossed ₹1.3 billion (equivalent to ₹2.0 billion or US$22 million in 2026) worldwide. With a total net collection of ₹602.6 million (equivalent to ₹950 million or US$10 million in 2026) in India, the film was declared as "Average" by Box Office India. The film was financially successful, earning a profit of ₹500 million (equivalent to ₹780 million or US$8.4 million in 2026) for Yash Raj Films.

==== Overseas ====
The film released across 2900 screens overseas on opening day and collected ₹164.8 million (equivalent to ₹260 million or US$2.8 million in 2026) becoming the fifteenth-highest overseas-grossing Bollywood film of the year.

== Soundtrack ==
Befikre

Soundtrack album by Vishal–Shekhar
- Released: 1 December 2016
- Genre: Feature film soundtrack
- Length: 26:05
- Language: Hindi
- Label: YRF Music
- Producer: Mikey McCleary

Vishal–Shekhar chronology
Banjo (2016)	Befikre (2016)

The soundtrack album was released on 1 December 2016 by YRF Music.

The film's soundtrack was composed by Vishal–Shekhar and produced by Mikey McCleary. The film score was composed by Mikey McCleary.

=== Track listing ===
All lyrics are written by Jaideep Sahni.

No.	Title	Singer (s)	Length
1.	"Nashe Si Chadh Gayi"	Arijit Singh, Caralisa Monteiro	3:58
2.	"Ude Dil Befikre"	Benny Dayal	3:51
3.	"Je T'aime"	Vishal Dadlani, Sunidhi Chauhan	4:01
4.	"You & Me"	Nikhil D'Souza, Rachel Varghese	3:18
5.	"Labon Ka Karobaar"	Papon	3:55
6.	"Khulke Dulke"	Gippy Grewal, Harshdeep Kaur, Ankur Tiwari, Kunal Ganjawala	3:15
7.	"Love Is a Dare" (Instrumental)	Vishal–Shekhar	3:47
Total length:			26:05

== Awards and nominations ==
Award	Category	Recipients and nominees	Result	Ref.
9th Mirchi Music Awards	Male Vocalist of The Year	Arijit Singh – "Nashe Si Chadh Gayi"	Nominated	
