= Horn 'Ok' Pleassss =

- Official Poster
- Directed by: Rakesh Sarang
- Written by: Mangesh Kulkarni; P. L. Mayekar; Jitendra Parmar (dialogue)
- Produced by: Abdul Siddiqui
- Starring: Nana Patekar; Muzammil Ibrahim; Rimi Sen
- Cinematography: Johny Lal
- Edited by: Sanjay Sankla
- Music by: Lalit Pandit; Amar Mohile
- Production companies: Sunrise Pictures; Sarang Films; Axis Movies
- Release date: 9 January 2009
- Running time: 162 minutes
- Country: India
- Language: Hindi

Horn 'Ok' Pleassss is a 2009 Indian Hindi-language comedy film directed by Rakesh Sarang. The film stars Muzammil Ibrahim, Rimi Sen, and Nana Patekar.

== Plot ==
Govinda (Nana Patekar) own life's theme works only around love. He's a truck driver and also a billionaire who goes out of his way to spread and support his 'hobby' for love. Ajay (Muzammil Ibrahim) loves Sia (Rimi Sen), the twin sister of Govinda's wife Ria (also played by Rimi Sen). Govinda does not know this. Ajay's unplanned surprise is his meeting with Govinda. And him seeking his help leads to a chain of incidents. This chain of incidents decides whether Ajay gets his lady, the Sia-Ria confusion is solved, and how Govinda will be able to survive this self-created life-or-death chaos for love.

== Cast ==
- Nana Patekar as Govinda
- Rimi Sen as Ria / Sia
- Muzammil Ibrahim as Ajay
- Ali Asgar
- Satish Shah
- Nirmiti Sawant
- Mukesh Tiwari
- Vrajesh Hirjee
- Kunika
- Shaurya Chauhan
- Rakhi Sawant as item dancer in the song "Nathani Utaaro"

== Soundtrack ==
No.	Title	Singer(s)
1	"Nathani Utaro"	Sunidhi Chauhan, Toshi Sabri
2	"Love Me Baby"	Shilpa Rao, Earl
3	"Ayela Ayela"	Sudesh Bhosle, Bela Shende, Nana Patekar
4	"Awaaj Kunacha Govind Cha"	Nana Patekar, Jaywant Wadkar
5	"Nathani Utaro (Remix)"	Shibu, Pinto
6	"Oya Oya"	Shilpa Rao, K.K.
7	"Pom Pom Pom"	Neeraj Shridhar
8	"Pom Pom Pom (Remix)"	Shibu, Pinto
