= Gauri Karnik =

Indian actress

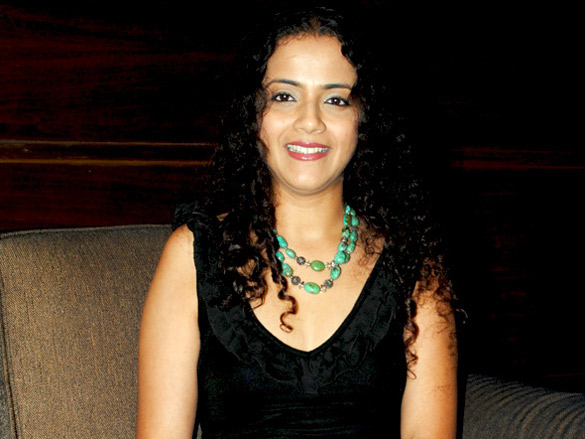
- Karnik in 2010
- Occupations: Model, actress
- Years active: 1998–2009, 2026 - present
- Spouse: Sarim Momin (m. 2010)

Gauri Karnik is a Hindi and Marathi film actress. She is best known for her acting in Sur in 2002.

== Personal life ==
Karnik is married to filmmaker Sarim Momin since 2010 and lives in Mumbai.

== Career ==
Karnik was a Miss India 1998 contestant.

She started her career by doing acting in the episodes of Rishtey like "Khel Khel Mein" which was aired on Zee TV during 1999-2001. Gauri Karnik acted in several Hindi films. The best known so far is Sur – The Melody of Life in 2002. In 2009 she acted last in a Kannada language film Karanji.

== Filmography ==
=== Films ===
Year	Films	Role	Notes
2002	Sur	Tina Marie D'Silva	
2004	Prarambh	Chamki	
2004	Stop!	Pooja	credited as Gauri S. Karnik
2005	Himalaya Singh	Indian beauty	credited as Gauri S. Karnik
2005	Hum Jo Keh Na Paaye	Divya	
2007	Fear		
2009	One Fine Monday		Filming
2009	Grohon: The Eclipse		Bengali
2009	Kaaranji		Kannada language film
2009	Pa Ma Ga Re Sa		Bengali

=== Television ===
Year	Films	Role	Network
1998	Sukanya	Ananya	
1999-2000	Rishtey	Maria	Zee TV
2000	Little Mirchi Thoda Pepper		Zee TV
2001	Hamare Tumhare	Riya	Zee TV
2026 - present	Suraag 2.0	Abida Shaikh	DD National

== Awards and nominations ==
Nominated

- 2003: Star Screen Award Most Promising Newcomer - Female for Sur
