= Dhokha =

- Theatrical Poster
- Directed by: Pooja Bhatt
- Written by: Shagufta Rafiq
- Produced by: Mukesh Bhatt
- Starring: Muzammil Ibrahim; Tulip Joshi
- Cinematography: Anshuman Mahaley
- Edited by: Devendra Murdeshwar
- Music by: M. M. Kreem
- Production company: Vishesh Films
- Release date: 31 August 2007
- Running time: 117 minutes
- Country: India
- Language: Hindi

Dhokha (transl. Betrayal) is a 2007 Indian Hindi-language action thriller film directed by Pooja Bhatt and produced by Mukesh Bhatt. The film stars Muzammil Ibrahim and Tulip Joshi. The soundtrack was composed by M. M. Kreem. It revolves around a moderate Indian Muslim cop, who wakes up and to his horror, discovers that his wife, who had recently been killed in a bomb blast, is accused of being a suicide bomber and had killed 20 people in the club. It is based on the novel The Attack by Yasmina Khadra.

Dhokha was released on 31 August 2007.

== Plot ==
Inspector Zaid Ahmed is notified on duty that there has been a bomb blast at a mall. After investigation, it was found out that the suicide bomber responsible was Sara Khan, Zaid's wife. Zaid finds it hard to believe in seeing his wife's dead body and claims to have dropped her at the bus stop. Zaid, who is inspected by the ATS (Anti Terrorism Squad), is called off duty temporarily by ATS Chief Raj Mehra but stands firm in his statement that his wife could not be the terrorist responsible.

One day he receives a DVD, by post, at home, which consists of his wife's dying testimonial in which she accepts that she is the responsible terrorist. Not believing what he has seen, Zaid decides to visit Sara's grandfather Saeed Noor Bux. Upon meeting him, Saeed reveals a rather shocking story. Sara's father had been arrested by the local police and had been beaten as he was suspected of terrorist activities. During the interrogation, he dies. The police hide his body and claim that he has run to Pakistan and was found guilty of being a terrorist.

When Saeed complains about this incident to higher authorities, Sara, her brother Daanish, and he himself are arrested by the Inspector and are forced to sign a statement that they do not want to investigate this case. Upon refusal, they make nude videos of Sara. After Saeed is forced to sign the statement, the inspector asks Saeed and Daanish to go home, takes Sara to a cell, and rapes her naked. Due to this incident, Sara and her brother start meeting a maulvi (Islamic scholar), who convinces them to lay down their lives by killing non-Muslims. While Sara was first in the league, her brother, who has been missing for a month, might follow her.

Zaid, horrified by this tale, tries to find Sarah's brother Danish and finds him when he is being prepared to blast himself in a few days. As a result of chasing him, he finds out the maulvi behind this, and shares harsh words with him. Later, he is shown a recording of Daanish accepting responsibility for another bombing yet to take place. The scholar's men tell Zaid they will let him go after the bombing has happened the following day, but he fights them and escapes to go after Daanish. Zaid finds Daanish at the station about to make a final call to his grandad and convinces him that he will get justice for Sara and their father. Daanish relents and hugs Zaid.

Zaid's rank is restored, and he resumes duty. He then explains to the senior police officers how they force terrorists to be born just because they are not able to give them justice. It is later shown that the corrupt inspector is arrested and sentenced, and Saeed and Daanish win the case with the help of Zaid.

== Cast ==
- Muzammil Ibrahim as ACP Zaid Ahmed Khan
- Tulip Joshi as Sarha P. Bux / Sarha Z. Khan
- Abhay Sachar as Danish, Sarah's brother
- Anupam Kher as Saeed, Sarah's grandfather
- Aushima Sawhney as Nandini, Zaid's ex-girlfriend
- Gulshan Grover as ATS Chief Raj Mehra
- Ashutosh Rana as Police Inspector
- Priyanka Sharma
- Anupam Shyam
- Bhanu Uday
- Raj Saluja as Adil, Zaid's friend
- Manish Makhija
- Sunil Kankekar
- Vineet Kumar as Police Inspector

== Soundtrack ==
Dhokha

Film score by mm creem
- Label: Sony Music

The soundtrack was composed by M. M. Kreem.

All music is composed by M. M. Kreem (Except Roya Re).

Soundtrack Album
No.	Title	Lyrics	Music	Singers	Length
1.	"Anjana"	Shakeel Azmi	Shakeel Azmi	KK	3:52
2.	"Roya Re"	Sayeed Quadri		Shiraz Uppal	4:43
3.	"Dhoka"	Bharat Bhushan Pant & Khushbir Singh Shaad		Rafaqat Ali Khan	5:21
4.	"Anjana"	Shakeel Azmi		M. M. Keeravani	4:13
5.	"Kab Tujhe"	Sayeed Quadri		KK, Shreya Ghoshal	6:36
6.	"Roya Re" (Remix)	Sayeed Quadri	Shakeel Azmi	Shiraz Uppal	5:02
7.	"Dhoka" (Remix)	Bharat Bhushan Pant & Khushbir Singh Shaad		Rafaqat Ali Khan	4:28
Total length:					34:12
