= Sunoh =

Studio album by Lucky Ali
- Released: 3 June 1996
- Genre: Pop, Folk
- Length: 38:23
- Language: Hindi
- Label: BMG Crescendo, Sony
- Producer: Lucky Ali

Lucky Ali chronology
Sunoh (1996)	Sifar (1998)

Sunoh (Hindi: सुनो, Urdu: سنو, translation: Listen) is the first album of the Indian singer Lucky Ali released in 1996. This Album made him very popular and he won many awards for it including the Best Pop Male Vocalist in the 1996 Screen Awards and the Channel V Viewers Choice Award (1997). It stayed on the MTV Asia Charts for 60 weeks. All lyrics were written by Lucky's childhood friend Syed Aslam Noor. According to Lucky, many record labels rejected the album as the genre was not popularised in India that time, then Lucky went to Amitabh Bachchan Corporation (ABCL), where the songs were unused for about 6 months. Then Lucky asked them back and then went to BMG Crescendo which agreed to release the album but asked Lucky to make the music video by himself, which led him to his childhood friend and ad film director Mahesh Mathai, who directed the iconic video of "O Sanam" in Cairo, Egypt. This marked the first Indian pop music video filmed outside of India.

The Song 'O Sanam' went on to become a popular track, becoming one of the most successful Indian pop songs .

== Track listing ==
No.	Title	Length
1.	"O Sanam"	3:44
2.	"Sunoh"	5:03
3.	"Pyaar ka Musafir"	3:24
4.	"Aap Par Arz"	3:19
5.	"Milegi Milegi Manzil"	3:24
6.	"Tum Hi Se"	4:03
7.	"Yeh Zameen Hai Aasman hai"	3:23
8.	"Jab Hum Chhote Hote The"	4:22
9.	"Kya Mausam Hai"	3:11
10.	"Yeh Mumbai Nagariya"	4:22
Total length:		38:23

== Credits ==
- Arranged by, Engineer: Michael McCleary
- Cover design: Pooja Mehta, Sonal Dabral
- Lyrics by Syed Aslam Noor, Arif Dehlvi (additional)
- Music by Lucky Ali
- Costumes: Iqbal & Imtiza
- Performed by Lucky Ali and Mikey McCleary
- Cover photography: Suresh Natarajan
- Producer: Lucky Ali

== Awards ==
Year	Award	Category	Song	Result
1996	Screen Awards	Best Male Pop Vocalist	"O Sanam"	Won
1997	Channel V Music Awards	Best Male Pop Vocalist	"O Sanam"	Won

== See also ==
- Lucky Ali discography
