= Pyaar Ke Side Effects =

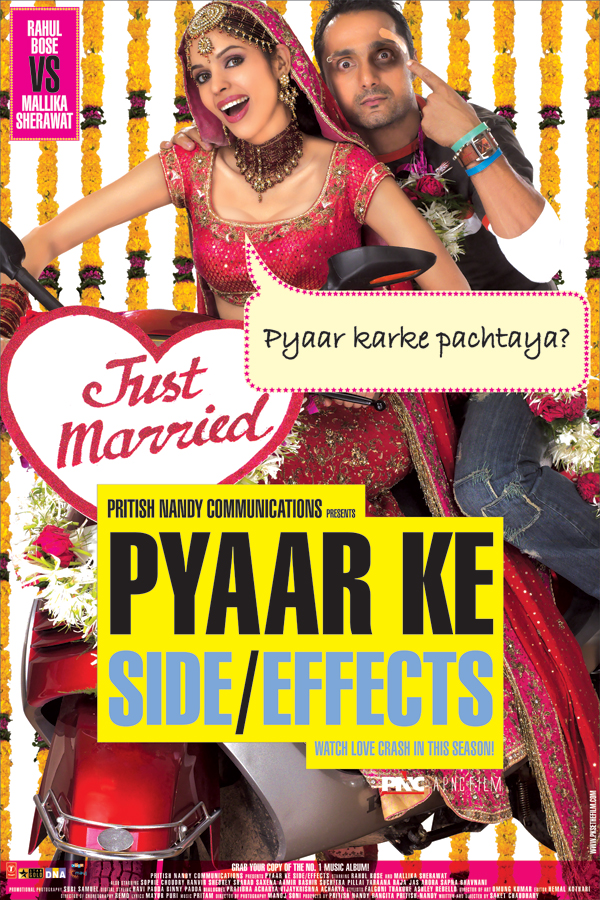
- Theatrical release poster
- Directed by: Saket Chaudhary
- Written by: Saket Chaudhary
- Produced by: Pritish Nandy; Rangita Pritish Nandy
- Starring: Mallika Sherawat; Rahul Bose; Ranvir Shorey
- Cinematography: Manoj Soni
- Edited by: Hemal Kothari
- Music by: Songs: Pritam; Background Score: Sameer Uddin
- Production company: Pritish Nandy Communications
- Release date: 15 September 2006
- Language: Hindi

Pyaar Ke Side Effects (English: The Side Effects of Love) is a 2006 Indian Hindi-language romantic comedy film written and directed by Saket Chaudhary. The film stars Mallika Sherawat and Rahul Bose in the lead roles. The film portrays the intricacies of a modern relationship, and explores the theme of 'commitment phobia' in a captivating manner, an interesting, witty take on men-women relationships. After the success of the film, the lead pair were paired in another film, Maan Gaye Mughal-e-Azam, however, the film was unsuccessful. A sequel, Shaadi Ke Side Effects, was released in 2014 with Vidya Balan and Farhan Akhtar in the lead roles.

== Plot ==
Siddharth Bose aka Sid is a short, thirtyish DJ, who finds himself playing music at Trisha Mallik's marriage to Vivek Chaddha in Delhi. However, he witnesses her fight her sense of responsibility and duty towards her parents and the groom, and runs away.

Six months later, he meets her again at a DJ competition in Mumbai, which he has just lost, yet again. Soon, they are in a relationship, and three years have passed. Trisha thinks she is ready for marriage, and gets down on her knee to propose to Sid. Sid suffering from the typical commitment phobia, is at a loss for a reasonable answer. In a bid to not lose her, Sid finds himself engaged.

But along with the engagement comes a new set of problems: shopping for furniture for their home, engagement rings, and more importantly, facing her father, Retired Major Veera Bhadra Mallik. Mallik has more than one problem with Sid, and thinks low of him, due to him earning a lot less than Trisha and not being responsible enough. Over an altercation Sid has with Mallik, the couple break up. Meanwhile, Vivek Chaddha is waiting in the wings, to help mend her broken heart. Sid on the other hand, finds himself being wooed by item girl, Tanya, the star of the 'Baby Girl Vol. 3' video.

After a few amusing run-ins, and an attempt to be just friends, Sid, finally realizes, thanks to his mother, that his commitment phobia is the result of a childhood scar. His father abandoned Sid and his mother, when Sid was very young. His mother reassures him, that he is nothing like his father, and would make a great husband. But it is too late, as Trisha has already agreed to marry Vivek. This leads him to Trisha's dear friend, Anjali, who reminds him of Dracula, because she always attacks him, for making Trisha unhappy. She helps him crash Trisha's wedding party. Trisha, after coming to know how much Sid has changed, happily breaks the wedding, and reunites with him.

== Cast ==
- Mallika Sherawat as Trisha Mallik
- Rahul Bose as Siddharth "Sid" Bose
- Ranvir Shorey as Narayanan "Nanu"
- Sophie Choudhary as Tanya (Baby Girl Vol.3)
- Suchitra Pillai-Malik as Anjali (Dracula)
- Sharat Saxena as Retd. Major Gen. Veera Bhadra Mallik
- Tarana Raja as Shalini
- Aamir Bashir as Kapil
- Jas Arora as Vivek Chaddha
- Sapna Bhavnani as Nina Manuel
- Shabnam Kapoor as Mrs. Mallik, Trisha's mother

== Soundtrack ==
Pyaar Ke Side/Effects

Soundtrack album by Pritam
- Released: 20 June 2006 (Physical release); 28 June 2006 (Digital Release); 15 September 2006 (Film Release)
- Recorded: Meet Brothers Studio; Spectral Harmony; Studio One; Music Empire
- Genre: Feature Film soundtrack
- Length: 40:45
- Label: T-Series
- Producer: Pritam

Pritam chronology
| Naksha (2006) | Pyaar Ke Side/Effects (2006) | Bas Ek Pal (2006) |

Pyaar Ke Side Effects, the album was released on 20 June 2006, consisting of 6 original songs and 3 remixes composed by Pritam.

All lyrics are written by Mayur Puri; all music is composed by Pritam.

Original iTunes track listing
| No. | Title | Singer(s) | Length |
|---|---|---|---|
| 1. | "Pyar Karke" | Bob, Labh Janjua, Suzanne D'Mello | 4:07 |
| 2. | "Dil Tod Ke Na Ja" | Rakesh Pandit, Richa Sharma | 4:42 |
| 3. | "Jaane Kya" | Zubeen Garg, Caralisa Monteiro | 6:14 |
| 4. | "Is This Love...(A-Mi-Manera)" | Kunal Ganjawala, Sunidhi Chauhan | 5:23 |
| 5. | "Pyar Karke..." (remix) | Bob, Labh Janjua, Suzanne D'Mello | 3:40 |
| 6. | "Bad Boy" (remix) | Alisha Chinai, Earl Edgar D'souza, Suzanne D'mello | 4:30 |
| 7. | "Dil Tod Ke Na Ja" (remix) | Mika Singh | 4:39 |
| 8. | "Allah Bachaye" | Alisha Chinai, Suzanne D'mello, Earl Edgar D'souza | 3:46 |
| 9. | "Bad Boy" | Sophie Choudhary, Earl Edgar D'souza, Suzanne D'mello | 3:44 |
| Total length: | | | 40:45 |

== Reception ==
Pyaar Ke Side Effects was a modest box office success, earning 74.7 million. The film garnered mixed reviews from critics. Several critics, such as Indiafm's Taran Adarsh felt that the second half of the film "drags".

== Sequel ==
The Pyaar Ke Side Effects team announced a sequel Shaadi Ke Side Effects in June 2012 with Vidya Balan and Farhan Akhtar in the roles of Trisha and Sid. All the other technicians returned for the sequel along with the director and music director. The film was released on 28 February 2014.
