= Himalaya Singh =

2005 Hong Kong film by Wai Ka-fai

- Film poster
- Directed by: Wai Ka-fai
- Written by: Wai Ka-fai; Au Kin-yee
- Produced by: Wai Ka-fai; Stephen Lam
- Starring: Lau Ching-wan; Ronald Cheng; Francis Ng; Cecilia Cheung; Cherrie Ying
- Cinematography: Joe Chan
- Edited by: Marco Mak
- Music by: Ronald Ng
- Production companies: One Hundred Years of Film; Sil-Metropole Organisation
- Distributed by: China Star Entertainment Group
- Release date: 3 February 2005
- Running time: 92 minutes
- Country: Hong Kong
- Languages: Cantonese; Hindi

Himalaya Singh (simplified Chinese: 喜马拉亚星; traditional Chinese: 喜馬拉亞星; Hindi: हिमालय सिंह) is a 2005 Hong Kong comedy film co-written and directed by Wai Ka-fai and starring Lau Ching-wan, Ronald Cheng, Francis Ng, Cherrie Ying and Gauri Karnik, with a special appearance by Cecilia Cheung.

== Plot ==
The story centers around yoga master Singh who wants to go in search of Indian Beauty. On his way, he meets Tally, a beautiful female gangster head. Because she doesn't want the Indian Beauty to have a good husband, Tally tried her best to make Singh a bad person.

In the meantime, Uncle Panic and his two nephews arrive in India for a tour. There, they meet up with a rich man. While they were having tea, they met an Indian man selling "Mysterious Water". The Indian man sells some of the liquid to Ng and Panic's nephews, which causes amnesia. Panic goes to a hotel and meets an illusion of Indian Beauty whom he saves from drowning in the hotel's pool. They become lovers, but only for a short while because Panic is being hypnotised. When he awakes, he continues to search for the illusion.

Meanwhile, Singh manages to become a bad person, to Tally's dismay. Tally has fallen in love with him, so she tries her very best to make him a good person again. The attempt succeeds when Tally and Singh drink a bottle of "Mysterious Water" which causes amnesia. However, the two become best friends.

Panic, on the other hand, is being poisoned by a two-headed snake that caused him to be able to perform impressive yoga asanas. Indian Beauty has fallen in love with Panic and wishes to marry him. Until that fateful day, the father of Indian Beauty declares that the contest of marrying his daughter to the best yoga master begins. Panic was able to see his nephews and Ng again in the contest and reunites with them.

Singh along with Ng and Panic were the finalists of the contest. They were to meditate and find out the true meaning of life. Singh passed the test and became the Brahma's assistant. Ng and Panic failed the test and decided to go back to where they came from.

Meanwhile, Panic's nephews was on a tour bus and shouted out to Ng and Panic to go on board quickly. Indian Beauty sees the chance to escape her father and ran away with her lover Panic. Tally found out that Singh's spirit has gone to be with the Brahma and blamed him for his irresponsibility (he promised to give a certain amount of money to her if he marries Indian Beauty).

Singh is now in the Brahma's palace and continue answer the prayers of the people for the Brahma. Unfortunately, the Brahma awoken from his 'dream' and everything vanished. The movie ends with the start of the Stone Age where everyone struggles to survive so as to avoid extinction.

== Cast ==
Actor	Role
Lau Ching-wan	Uncle Panic
Ronald Cheng	Singh
Francis Ng	Conman
Cecilia Cheung	Peacock
Cherrie Ying	Tally
Gauri Karnik	Indian Beauty
Shing Fui-On	Sor – Tally's Worker
