= Will You Marry Me? (film) =

2012 Indian film by Aditya Datt

- Directed by: Aditya Datt
- Written by: Jay Master
- Produced by: Krishan Chaudhary; Vipin Jain
- Starring: Shreyas Talpade; Rajeev Khandelwal; Tripta Parashar; Mugdha Godse; Celina Jaitly; Muzammil Ibrahim
- Cinematography: R. Dvaaraghanath
- Edited by: Irfan Shaikh
- Music by: Sachin Gupta; Toshi-Sharib; Gaurav Dagaonkar
- Production company: Ikkon Films
- Release date: 2 March 2012
- Country: India
- Language: Hindi

Will You Marry Me? is a 2012 Indian Hindi-language romantic comedy film directed by Aditya Datt. The film stars Shreyas Talpade, Rajeev Khandelwal, Tripta Parashar, Mugdha Godse, Celina Jaitly and Muzammil Ibrahim in lead roles. It was shot in several locations including Fujairah, Dubai, Mumbai, and Bangkok.

== Plot ==
The film is about three bachelors, Aarav, Nikhil, and Rajveer, who, along with eleven other collegemates, sign a contract with two clauses. The first clause says that all of them have to purchase a certain number of Reliance shares, and the second explains that all the shares will go to the man who will remain unmarried till the end. Slowly and steadily, people start to break away from the rule, and only Nikhil, Rajveer, and Aarav remain single. Nikhil is in love with his childhood friend Anjali and wants to settle down with her, but the other two have no such plans. However, they find the proceedings interesting after discovering Anjali's best friend Sneha at the wedding. Suddenly all their plans to remain unmarried till the end vanish, and the two start trying to win Sneha's heart. Meanwhile, one of Rajveer's friends gives him Rs 50 million to keep, but Rajveer, being smart enough, invests the money in the stock market, only to find that the company he invested in has crashed, and a powerful business magnate is after him. Rajveer plans to convince Aarav to marry Sneha so that he can get all the Reliance shares and pay his due. His plans fail when Aarav manages to listen in on a secret conversation.

== Cast ==
- Rajeev Khandelwal as Rajveer Sanghi
- Mugdha Godse as Sneha Sharma
- Shreyas Talpade as Aarav Birla
- Muzammil Ibrahim as Nikhil Ahuja
- Manoj Joshi as Anjali's father
- Tripta Parashar as Anjali Dutt
- Celina Jaitly as Vaishali Kapoor (special appearance)
- Paresh Rawal as Gutka King (Sneha's father)

== Production ==
The crew shot in the United Arab Emirates from 26 May – 14 June 2010, according to Mugdha Godse's Twitter. The crew then shot in Mumbai. Filming was completed in Bangkok, Thailand from 24 July – 2 August 2010. "Sixty per cent of the film's story is set in the UAE", says director Aditya Datt.

== Soundtrack ==
The album features 6 tracks composed by Sharib-Toshi, Gaurav Dagaonkar and Sachin Gupta.

=== Track listing ===
Song	Singer(s)	Music	Length
"Kalma"	Toshi Sabri	Toshi-Sharib	5:53
"Soniye"	Rahat Fateh Ali Khan	Gaurav Dagaonkar	4:44
"Superman"	Sukhwinder Singh, Jaspreet Jasz, Kshitij Tarey	Sachin Gupta	4:00
"Danke Ki Chot"	Master Saleem, Shweta Pandit	Toshi-Sharib	3:53
"Tu Ru Tu Ru Tu"	Sachin Gupta, Monali Thakur	Sachin Gupta	3:52
"Danke Ki Chot" (Duet)	Master Saleem, Daler Mehndi, Shweta Pandit	Toshi-Sharib	4:50

== Reception ==
The film received mostly negative reviews. Preeti Arora of Rediff.com gave it 2 out of 5 stars, with the comment, "'Will You Marry Me?' fails to impress". Times Of India gave it 1.5 out of 5. The movie was declared a disaster in first week of its release with total net gross of only Rs. 41 lac in the first week.
