= Saket Chaudhary =

Indian screenwriter

- Occupations: Screenwriter; Director
- Known for: Hindi Medium (2017)

Saket Chaudhary is an Indian screenwriter and director mostly known for 2017 sleeper hit Hindi Medium. He also co-wrote Santosh Sivan's Asoka and is the director of Pyaar Ke Side Effects, released in September 2006.

== Early life and career ==
Chaudhary originally wanted to be an Engineer, but changed his focus to Media & Communications when he attended the Department of Media & Communication Studies (DMCS), Savitribai Phule Pune University (SPPU). After graduation, he wrote various television series and worked as assistant director to Aziz Mirza on Phir Bhi Dil Hai Hindustani (2000). Santosh Sivan was the Cinematographer and offered Chaudhary a chance to help him write the screenplay for his upcoming film Asoka.

Chaudhary ventured into direction himself after seeing Farhan Akhtar's Dil Chahta Hai (2001). The film inspired him to pen the screenplay for his directorial debut Pyaar Ke Side Effects (2006). Chaudhary followed it with a sequel, Shaadi Ke Side Effects (2014). He next directed Hindi Medium with Irrfan Khan in the lead role. He is working on an untitled project produced by Sajid Nadiadwala with Alia Bhatt in the main lead.

== Filmography ==
=== Director ===
Year	Title	Notes
2000	Phir Bhi Dil Hai Hindustani	Assistant director
2006	Ghoom	
2006	Pyaar Ke Side Effects	
2014	Shaadi Ke Side Effects	
2017	Hindi Medium	Nominated - Filmfare Award for Best Director

=== Writer ===
Year	Title	Notes
2001	Asoka	Co-writer
2006	Pyaar Ke Side Effects	
2014	Shaadi Ke Side Effects	
