= Nashe Si Chadh Gayi =

2016 Hindi Song

- Song cover featuring actors Ranveer Singh and Vaani Kapoor

Song by Arijit Singh, Caralisa Monteiro

from the album Befikre
- Language: Hindi; Punjabi; French
- Released: 18 October 2016
- Genre: EDM
- Length: 3:57
- Label: YRF Music
- Composer(s): Vishal–Shekhar
- Lyricist(s): Jaideep Sahni Caralisa Monteiro
- Producer(s): Mikey McCleary and Vishal–Shekhar

Music video
- "Nashe Si Chadh Gayi" on YouTube

"Nashe Si Chadh Gayi" (transl. Upon me like intoxication) is a Hindi song sung by Arijit Singh with the French vocals provided by Caralisa Monteiro. The music is composed by Vishal–Shekhar and the lyrics are penned by Jaideep Sahni and the French lyrics penned by Caralisa Monteiro. It is one of the songs from the soundtrack of the film Befikre, dance choreographed by Vaibhavi Merchant, and performed by Ranveer Singh and Vaani Kapoor.

== Critical reception ==
The tune of the song is "directly lifted" from the title track of the Japanese animated series, Junjo Romantica, claimed DNA's web team in one of their news. To which Vishal Dadlani, one of the music composers of the song replied that "it is just an 'uncanny coincidence'".

The song's music video has garnered over 671 million views on as of March 2025 YouTube.

== Accolades ==
Year	Award Ceremony	Category	Recipient	Result	Reference(s)
2016	Mirchi Music Awards	Male Vocalist of the Year	Arijit Singh	Nominated	
2017	MT20Jubilee Awards	Golden Disc	Jaideep Sahni, Vishal–Shekhar, Arijit Singh and Caralisa Monteiro	Won	
