= Little Mirchi Thoda Pepper =

- Genre: Comedy
- Directed by: Saurabh Shukla
- Starring: see below
- Country of origin: India
- Original language: Hindi
- No. of episodes: 12

Production
- Producers: Barnali Shukla & Monica Chandna
- Running time: 25 minutes

Original release
- Network: Zee TV
- Release: 2000 – 2000

Little Mirchi Thoda Pepper is an Indian television Hindi language comedy series aired on Zee TV channel in 2000. The story portrays the challenges that a man faces in his daily life, and how these challenges can be a big hurdle. The story of the series is written by an Indian director/actor, Saurabh Shukla and his wife Barnali Shukla.

== Cast ==
- Gauri Karnik
- Vikram Gokhale
- Suchitra Pillai
- Rajat Kapoor
- Haiku Chandna
