= Meri Jaan Hindustan =

Compilation album by Various artists
- Released: 11 August 1997
- Genre: World, Folk
- Length: 35:35
- Label: BMG Crescendo; EMI Records

Meri Jaan Hindustan is a 1997 Indian compilation album released on the 50th anniversary of Indian independence. The album featured various artists. It consisted of a total of eight songs.

== Track listing ==
Meri Jaan Hindustan

Soundtrack album by: Ilaiyaraaja; Lucky Ali; Karthik Raja; Vishal Bharadwaj; M.M Kreem; Dr. L. Subramaniam; Remo Fernandes; Baba Sehgal
- Released: 1997 (First edition); 2012 (Second edition)
- Recorded: Prasad Studio, Chennai
- Genre: Feature film soundtrack
- Length: 35:35
- Label: EMI Records

The album consists of eight songs from its first release in 1997:

No.	Title	Lyrics	Music	Singer(s)	Length
1.	"Anjaani Raahon Mein"	P. K. Mishra	Lucky Ali	Lucky Ali	4:40
2.	"Apna Desh"	Bashir Badr	Vishal Bharadwaj	Hariharan	4:50
3.	"Kho Jaane Do"	P. K. Mishra	M. M. Kreem	M. M. Kreem & K.S. Chithra	4:30
4.	"Apna Josh Hai"	P. K. Mishra	Ilaiyaraaja	Kamal Haasan	4:03
5.	"Theme from the Global Symphony"		Dr. L. Subramaniam	The Berlin Philharmonic Orchestra	5:44
6.	"Sehera Bandh Ke Nikle"	P. K. Mishra & Iqbal Patni	Karthik Raja	Karthik Raja	3:58
7.	"Howwzzaatt"	Dev Kohli	Baba Sehgal	Baba Sehgal	3:48
8.	"Zindadili"	P. K. Mishra	Remo Fernandes	Remo Fernandes	4:50
