= Sur – The Melody of Life =

Sur
- Movie poster for Sur – The melody of life
- Directed by: Tanuja Chandra
- Written by: Tanuja Chandra
- Produced by: Pritish Nandy; Rangita Pritish Nandy; Pooja Bhatt
- Starring: Lucky Ali; Gauri Karnik; Simone Singh; Achint Kaur; Divya Dutta; Harsh Vashisht
- Cinematography: Nirmal Jani
- Edited by: Hemanti Sarkar
- Music by: M. M. Kreem
- Production company: Pritish Nandy Communications
- Distributed by: Pritish Nandy Communications
- Release date: 13 September 2002
- Country: India
- Language: Hindi

Sur – The Melody of Life is a 2002 Indian Hindi-language musical drama film starring Lucky Ali and Gauri Karnik. This film is loosely based on the 1992 Telugu film Swati Kiranam which itself was inspired by the 1984 film Amadeus.

The film was theatrically released on 13 September 2002. It was a commercial failure.

== Plot ==
Vikramaditya Singh is a teacher in a music school where he, with others, polishes every student's voice to make them stars. Although Vikramaditya is a famous singer himself, he is not satisfied with his creations; he is looking for a special person. His heart longs for someone so special that, if worked on, would be a masterpiece who would be known as the most worthy graduate and the world's most talented singer. He accidentally meets Tina, who has a magical voice. He learns about her when she sings a prayer in church. Vikramaditya decides to take her to his school, where she can pay more attention to singing. Vikramaditya moulds her into a brilliant singer, and she emerges a star. In spite of Vikramaditya's dream coming true, he starts feeling jealous when he discovers Tina's success. He is not able to take in the fact that she is better than he is, so he starts competing with her. He starts breaking her confidence, then dominates and overpowers her. Later, Vikramaditya realizes his mistake and compensates for it by letting her sing at a concert that was dedicated to him. Tina performs at the concert dedicating her love for Vikramaditya, and the concert is a huge success. Later, Tina goes to meet Vikram at his house, and feels grateful to Vikram and expresses her desire to sing with him. But Vikram rejects her proposal, telling her that she should sing alone and that he wants her to become a big name in the future. A heartbroken Tina leaves Vikram's house and continues her career, dedicating it to Vikram.

== Cast ==
- Lucky Ali as Vikramaditya Singh
- Gauri Karnik as Tina Marie D'Silva
- Simone Singh as Divya
- Achint Kaur as Pooja, Music Company Assistant
- Harsh Vashisht as Aqib
- Divya Dutta as Rita D'Silva
- Ehsaan Khan as Harman
- Yashodhan Bal as Vishal, Music Company Contractor

== Soundtrack ==
Sur – The Melody of Life

Soundtrack album by M. M. Keeravani
- Released: April 2002
- Recorded: 2002
- Genre: Film soundtrack
- Length: 48:18
- Label: Universal Music India
- Producer: M. M. Keeravani

M. M. Keeravani chronology
Tappu Chesi Pappu Koodu (2002)	Sur – The Melody of Life (2002)	Okato Number Kurraadu (2002)

The soundtrack was composed by M. M. Keeravani and lyrics were penned by Nida Fazli.

All lyrics are written by Nida Fazli.

No.	Title	Singers	Length
1.	"Aa Bhi Jaa Aa Bhi Jaa"	Lucky Ali, Sunidhi Chauhan	6:03
2.	"Aao Tumhe Ek Nayi Baat"	Lucky Ali	4:48
3.	"Ave Maria"	Marijke Desouza	2:44
4.	"Dil Mein Jagi Dhadkan Aise"	Sunidhi Chauhan	5:14
5.	"Jaane Kya Dhoondhta Hai"	Lucky Ali	7:12
6.	"Kabhi Shaam Dhale"	Mahalakshmi Iyer	8:14
7.	"Khoya Hai Tune Jo Ae Dil"	Lucky Ali	4:40
8.	"Sur (Theme)" (Instrumental)		2:41
9.	"Tu Dil Ki Khushi"	Lucky Ali, Sunidhi Chauhan	6:42
Total length:			48:18

== Critical reception ==
Taran Adarsh of IndiaFM gave the film 1.5 stars out 5, writing ″Lucky Ali enacts his part with utmost ease and is a complete natural. Camera friendly and confident, he provides ample evidence that a singer can make a good actor as well. Gauri Karnik looks ordinary, but is a bundle of talent. Simone Singh is first-rate. Achint Kaur and Divya Dutta lend adequate support. On the whole, SUR holds appeal for a select few in metros only. For the hoi polloi, looking for masala, the film has precious little to offer. Anita Bora of Rediff.com wrote ″Sur may not be rousing fare for the front-benchers, but it is a worthy attempt at exploring love and jealousy from a fresh angle. The film does a good job of taking you through the three hours without the usual hero-heroine singing-around-the-trees routine. Though the ending leaves you unsatisfied. After the build-up, music and emotions, the film ends abruptly. Backed by good music, Chandra's film has a fresh approach and is a mark above the usual fare found these days.
