= Ude Dil Befikre =

Bollywood song from feature film Befikre

Single by Vishal–Shekhar, Benny Dayal

from the album Befikre (Original Motion Picture Soundtrack)
- Language: Hindi; French
- Released: 3 November 2016
- Genre: Bollywood
- Length: 3:51
- Label: Yash Raj Films
- Composer(s): Vishal–Shekhar
- Lyricist(s): Jaideep Sahni

"Ude Dil Befikre" (transl. Heart flies carefree) is a song from the soundtrack of the 2016 Hindi film Befikre. The song is composed by Vishal–Shekhar, written by Jaideep Sahni and sung by Benny Dayal. The music video features Ranveer Singh, and Vaani Kapoor, and it was released by Yash Raj Films.

The composer duo Vishal–Shekhar composed the song on a stairwell. Ranveer Singh asked background actors to slap him in the face to help him achieve the desired expressions on the music video; he was slapped 21 times. The song was released on 3 November 2016.

== Background ==
The song is written by Jaideep Sahni, extra French vocals by Sophie Choudry, and choreographed by Vaibhavi Merchant. Composers Vishal–Shekhar said that the entire song was composed on a stairwell. The duo said that it was hard to find the right singer for the song, explaining: "When someone suggested Benny Dayal's name for the song and we were like he's a south Indian, we want someone who can get Arabic nuances", then they found out that Dayal spent his childhood in Oman and knew Arabic music. Later, they described him as "He came in and nailed it".

== Music video ==
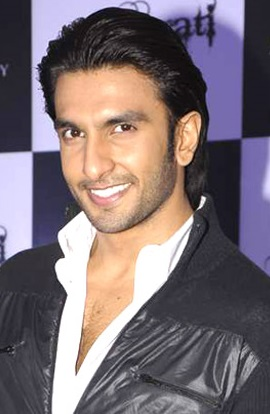
Ranveer Singh (pictured in 2011) asked the background actors to slap him 21 time to ensure he got the right expressions for the music video.

The music video is set in Paris. Ranveer Singh described the weather during the filming as: "so cold that Adi [Aditya Chopra] has to come to us saying you are not feeling cold". The song features UNESCO heritage sites from France, as a member of the film crew told Bollywood Hungama:

In the song when Vaani strips atop a table, you see the National Public Library, a historic spot from Paris that has never been seen onscreen before. Ranveer and Vaani shake a leg on the terrace of the Opera Garnier, the city's famous historic house. A location that has been seen onscreen for the first time, only a four-member crew along with the actors was allowed to film at this tricky high spot.

Choreographer Vaibhavi Merchant said that film director Aditya Chopra wanted to "scale up the level of craziness". The director titled the song as a 'dare song' and revealed that in the video the on-screen characters would assign each other for a few dares, but Merchant explained that "that was not it for even the choreographers had a tough task at hand to complete the song in scheduled time". When filming the music video, actor Ranveer Singh asked the background actors to slap him hard across his face to ensure that he got the right expressions for the music video, and was slapped 21 times.

In the music video, Vaani Kapoor and Ranveer Singh's characters dare each other to do various things such as "stripteases, ballet on the streets and stealing a football from the stadium during an ongoing match".

Chart performance
Chart (2016)	Peak position
Asian Music Charts (Official Charts Company)	11
The Times of India Mirchi Top 20 Chart	6

== Release ==
The song was released on 3 November 2016. It received 9 million views on YouTube in its two weeks of release.

Devansh Sharma of Firstpost wrote, "Vishal-Shekhar's energetic and high-octane music serves as an appropriate background score and Benny Dayal's vocals adds the punch". Rachit Gupta writing for Filmfare said that the visuals of "Ude Dil Befikre" "are gold standard". Urvi Parikh of Pink Villa said that the song is "spot on". India wrote: "[the song] tries too hard to be unabashed love. But simply put the song both lyrically and visually is repetitive". News18 wrote that: "[the song] will force you to dance carefree wherever you are". Bollywood Hungama called the song "a visual treat".

The Himalayan Times wrote: "Songs Nashe Si Chadh Gayi and Ude Dil Befirke make the audience groove and sing with them". Suparna Thombare of Cinestaan wrote: "Ude Dil Befikre is a joyride and an easy-on-the-ears party number". India Today wrote: "The high octane number, composed by Vishal-Shekhar and sung by Benny Dayal, is catchy and does not go the old-school way of mush and romance".

Release history
Country	Date	Format(s)	Label	Ref.
Various	1 December 2016	Digital download	Yash Raj Films	
