= Dushman Duniya Ka =

- Theatrical release poster
- Directed by: Mehmood
- Written by: Aziz Quaisi
- Produced by: Ashok Mishra; Babubhai; Masoom Ali
- Starring: Jeetendra; Sumalatha; Manzoor Ali; Laila
- Cinematography: S. Naidu
- Edited by: S. Heera
- Music by: Anu Malik
- Production companies: Zee Music Company; Canmore Cinema
- Release date: 20 September 1996
- Running time: 162 mins
- Country: India
- Language: Hindi
- Budget: ₹1.25 crore
- Box office: ₹1.13 crore

Dushman Duniya Ka (transl. Enemy of the World) is a 1996 Hindi-language Psychological drama Thriller film, directed by Mehmood and produced by Ashok Mishra, Babubhai, Masoom Ali under the Canmore Cinema banner. It stars Jeetendra, Sumalatha, Manzoor Ali, Laila while Shah Rukh Khan and Salman Khan appeared in guest appearances. The music was composed by Anu Malik. It marks the debut of Laila and Manzoor Ali. The film was released on 20 September 1996 and emerged as a box-office disaster.

== Plot ==
The story follows Mahesh, a man of integrity and diligence who, having been raised in an orphanage, knows nothing of his lineage. While out with his close friend Badru, he meets Reshma, a fellow orphan. With Badru’s encouragement and blessing, Mahesh and Reshma marry and build a harmonious life together. Their happiness is soon doubled by the birth of their son, Lucky, who grows up mirroring his father’s honest and hardworking nature.

The first crack in their peaceful life appears when a young Lucky is caught smoking. When confronted, he reveals that an old man near his school has been selling him cigarettes. In the ensuing confrontation, the vendor flees; during the chase, Badru is tragically hit by a truck and killed, leaving Mahesh’s family to navigate the future without their loyal friend. Years later, Lucky is a young man on the verge of marrying his partner, Lata. However, Mahesh’s world is shattered when he discovers drugs in Lucky’s possession. Although Lucky initially promises to change, the addiction proves too strong. One afternoon, Mahesh witnesses a drug deal involving his son and alerts the authorities. In the subsequent raid, the other youths test positive for narcotics, but Lucky is found to be clean. Despite his innocence in this specific instance, the damage to the family’s trust is absolute. A heated confrontation follows, resulting in Mahesh ousting his son out of the house and following this, Lata also breaks up with Lucky.

Ostracized by his father and abandoned by Lata, Lucky spirals into a life of crime and drug use. Desperate for money to fund his addiction, he and his gang attempt various petty crimes by stealing money and watches, snatching the chains and once barging into a house, where Lucky's friend Raman tries to molest one young woman, which is interrupted by Lucky. After various failed attempts for getting drugs and money, the gang plans to rob a jewelry store in order to fund for their drugs. The robbery goes wrong, and a wounded Lucky flees to his childhood home. In a drug-fueled frenzy, he begs his mother for money; when she refuses, he attempts to forcibly steal her mangalsutra. During the violent struggle, Lucky kills his mother.

Devastated by the loss of his wife and the irredeemable state of his son, Mahesh concludes that Lucky is beyond rehabilitation and humanity. Believing death to be the only escape for his son’s drug addiction, Mahesh performs a mercy killing. He then surrenders to the police, but before his incarceration, he visits Lucky’s imprisoned friends. In a final, poignant plea, he implores them to reform their lives and stay away from drugs so they do not become a burden to their families. The film concludes with the somber image of Mahesh and the reformed youths cremating both Reshma and Lucky.

== Cast ==
- Jeetendra as Mahesh Thakur
- Sumalatha as Reshma
- Manzoor Ali as Lucky, Mahesh's and Reshma's son.
- Laila as Lata, Lucky's love interest.
- Nasir Khan as Mushtaq, Lucky's friend.
- Johnny Lever as Head Master / College Lecturer
- Farida Jalal as the Manager of women's shelter.
- Anjana Mumtaz as Asha, Lata's mother.
- Mehmood as Bakrewale Baba
- Ali Asgar as Raman, Lucky's friend.
- Jankidas Mehra as Jankidas
- Manmauji as Shop-Keeper
- Ashok Kumar as Doctor
- Lilliput as Professor Liliput
- Raza Murad as Vikram Singh
- Jagdish Raj as Police Inspector
- Kailash Nath as Drug Dealer
- Shahrukh Khan as Badru, Rickshaw Driver and Mahesh's friend (special appearance)
- Salman Khan as himself (special appearance)

== Soundtrack ==
All songs were penned by Ravindra Jain, and all songs are composed by Anu Malik.

The parody song Mere Naujawano Pyare Naujawano sung by Amit Kumar has the same tune and rhythm of the song Mere Bhole Balam (Meri Pyari Bindu) from the 1968 film Padosan, and the song was composed by R.D. Burman, and was recreated by Anu Malik. This song was a tribute to Kishore Kumar by his son Amit Kumar who sung the song, Anu Malik the composer, and Salman Khan who acted as himself, but was dressed as Kishore Kumar's character Vidyapati (Guru) going to a shooting to act in Padosan part 2. Salman Khan also had behaved like Kishore Kumar in terms of dancing, walking, acting, and talking, and Amit Kumar's singing resembled like his father giving playback to Salman Khan, and Anu Malik's composition was nostalgic for people.

#	Title	Singer(s)
1	"Mere Samne Gudian Japani Hain"	Kumar Sanu, Alka Yagnik
2	"Hum Yuva Hain"	Abhijeet Bhattacharya
3	"Bakrewale Baba"	Mehmood
4	"Darwaza Kahi"	Asha Bhosle, Sudesh Bhosle
5	"Tanha Dil Sulagta Tha"	Kumar Sanu, Alka Yagnik
6	"Tumko Rulhata Hi Raha"	Kumar Sanu
7	"Nasha Nasha"	Lucky Ali
8	"Mere Naujawano Pyare Naujawano"	Amit Kumar
