= Xsuie =

Studio album by Lucky Ali
- Released: 2009
- Genre: World, Folk
- Length: 27:02
- Label: Open
- Producer: Mike McCleary

Lucky Ali chronology
Kabhi Aisa Lagta Hai (2004)	Xsuie (2009)	Raasta Man (2011)

Xsuie is the fifth studio album by Lucky Ali. It was released in 2009 and was available freely on the internet. Xsuie means at your own pace in Urdu. The album marked the debut of Lucky Ali as a director as he directed videos for the songs that featured on the album.

Later on, all songs of this album were included in Lucky Ali's next album Raasta Man which was released in 2011. However, the alternate English titles given to songs previously were removed.

== Track listing ==
The album consists of seven songs:

- Dil Gaye Jaa (My Heart Keep on Singing)
- Duniya Ka Samundar (Sea Of Life)
- Yeh Zindagi (Everyone's Watching)
- O Raahi (You Are Never On Your Own)
- Khudahafiz (We Don't Have to Say Goodbye)
- Rehne De
- With You

== See also ==
- Lucky Ali discography
