= Caralisa Monteiro =

Indian singer (born 1985)

- Born: Mumbai, India
- Occupations: Singer, composer
- Instruments: Vocals, keyboards
- Years active: 1999–present

Caralisa Monteiro is an Indian singer known for advertising jingles and Bollywood songs.

== Early life ==
Caralisa Monteiro was born to Emeline Monteiro, a school teacher at Don Bosco High School, Matunga and Neville Monteiro an opera singer and an accountant in Mahindra and Mahindra, she was exposed to music at a very young age. She attended Sophia College where she studied Economics and English.

At the age of 11 her mother died from cancer. Her sister Giselle was a social worker and music director who died after she was diagnosed with breast cancer in the last stages.

== Career ==
=== Advertising ===
Caralisa began working with music directors Loy Mendonsa and Ehsaan Noorani of Shankar–Ehsaan–Loy. During her career she has worked in over 7000 jingles which she has sung on, rendered her voice to, written lyrics for, co - composed and composed. She has been referred to as the "Jingle Queen". She was also the voice behind the jingle for the Limca brand that featured Sushama Reddy. Caralisa started writing her own songs in college but due to the demands of being the only bread winner in her family at an early age, had to concentrate on work.

=== Bollywood and other ===
Her first break with Bollywood came when the acclaimed trio Shankar–Ehsaan–Loy invited her to sing the chorus of the song "Jaane Kyon" from the cult film Dil Chahta Hai in 2001. She was known for the rendition of English parts in Hindi songs and continues to work in the Hindi film music industry on background scores. Monteiro has sung on mainstream Bollywood films like Rock On!! (Phir Dekhiye), Don theme, Don 2 (Don Waltz), Kabhi Alvida Naa Kehna where she sang the song "Mitwa" with Shafqat Amanat Ali, Karthik Calling Karthik with Shankar Mahadevan.On Anjaana Anjaani she sang the song "Tumse hi Tumse" for which she received a co-writing credit. In the movie Hum Tum Aur Ghost, she performed the song 'Kal Tum The Yahan' which was a duet with Shankar Mahadevan. She also sang on "Sam's Theme" from the movie New York (film) and on Kabul Express she also performed the theme for Kaal while on Salaam Namaste she performed a duet with Shaan.

She also sang in Tamil Cinema, including "Maaricham" a song written by music director A. R. Rahman from the movie Sillunu Oru Kaadhal in 2006 and "Porkkalam" from the movie Yaaro Iran Yaaro. Monteiro starred in the musical On Broadway which was a mash up of several musicals. She has worked with the Welsh musician and composer Karl Jenkins performing the track "Hymn" on his project Adiemus: Songs of Sanctuary for his India tour as the only soloist. She was featured on Dance Masti, a dance album by Farhad Wadia. Caralisa has sung the Hindi version of "When You Believe" from the DreamWorks Animation for the film The Prince of Egypt.

=== Independent Music ===
Monteiro entered and was one of the finalist on Sutasi, an Asian talent hunt in 2008. Her debut album Illusions was released in 2015 which is a multi-genre album with songs featuring Jazz, Soul, Rock and Blues. She made an appearance with the band Overhung at the finale of Harley Rock Riders: Season IV and guested on the band's song "Waste". Monteiro wrote and recorded the ballad "All Alone" that was featured on the Indie movie Rize of the Zombie starring Luke Kenny.

== Social Activism ==
She performed at the 'Rhythm and Blues Festival' organized by the Genesis Foundation and supported by Rolling Stone Magazine (India) to raise funds for underprivileged children to provide critical life-saving interventions in 2013. She has committed to raise awareness for breast cancer through her to be released debut album's lead single "Angel in Disguise" and to raise funds to assist cancer survivors and people currently battling the disease.

== Filmography ==
Year	Film	Song	Notes
2023	Pathaan	Besharam Rang	
2016	Befikre	Nashe Si Chadh Gayi	Written the French lyrics
2016	Fitoor	Ranga Re	Also wrote lyrics
2015	Shamitabh	Sha Sha Sha Mi Mi Mi	
2012	Rise of the Zombie	All Alone	Singer/Composer
2012	Cocktail		
2011	Ladies vs Ricky Bahl		
2011	Don 2: The Chase Continues		
2010	Break Ke Baad		
2010	Porkkalam	Yaaro Ivan Yaaro	Italian phrases
2010	Anjaana Anjaani	Tumse Hi Tumse	
2010	Karthik Calling Karthik		
2009	New York		
2008	Rock On!!	Phir Dekhiye	
2007	The Great Indian Butterfly	You have To Love Me	
2007	Om Shanti Om	Dard-E-Disco	
2007	Hattrick	I'm Coming Home Again	
2006	Sillunu Oru Kaadhal	Maaricham	
2006	Kabul Express		
2006	Kabhi Alvida Naa Kehna	Mitwa	
2005	The Blue Umbrella		
2005	Dil Jo Bhi Kahey		
2005	Salaam Namaste	Salaam Namaste	
2005	Dus		
2005	Kaal		
2001	Dil Chahta Hai	Jaane Kyun	
