= Shaadi Ke Side Effects =

2014 Indian film by Saket Chaudhary

- Theatrical release poster
- Directed by: Saket Chaudhary
- Written by: Additional Screenplay and Dialogues: Arshad Syed
- Screenplay by: Zeenat Lakhani; Saket Chaudhary
- Story by: Zeenat Lakhani; Saket Chaudhary
- Produced by: Ekta Kapoor; Shobha Kapoor; Pritish Nandy
- Starring: Farhan Akhtar; Vidya Balan; Ram Kapoor; Vir Das
- Cinematography: Manoj Lobo
- Edited by: Chandan Arora
- Music by: Songs: Pritam; Mikey McCleary; Background Score: Mikey McCleary
- Production company: Pritish Nandy Communications
- Distributed by: Balaji Motion Pictures
- Release date: 28 February 2014
- Running time: 145 minutes
- Country: India
- Language: Hindi
- Budget: ₹430 million
- Box office: est. ₹696 million

Shaadi Ke Side Effects (transl. Side effects of marriage) is a 2014 Indian Hindi-language romantic comedy film directed by Saket Chaudhary, and starring Farhan Akhtar and Vidya Balan. It is the sequel to the 2006 film Pyaar Ke Side Effects. The film is produced by Balaji Motion Pictures and Pritish Nandy Communications. The film is about a young couple who experience many comic events after their marriage. It was released on 28 February 2014.

== Plot ==
Sid (Farhan Akhtar) and Trisha (Vidya Balan) are a happily married couple until Trisha gets pregnant and things start getting complicated. Sid is not ready for a baby, as he is just a struggling music composer, yet he lies to Trisha. On his friends' advice, Sid starts reading pregnancy books and following Trisha's daily routine by putting a balloon in his shirt. Finally, Trisha gives birth to a baby girl and starts devoting all her time to the baby. Trisha's mother (Rati Agnihotri) feels that Sid is a careless person and can not take on this responsibility, at which Sid makes a desperate attempt to behave like a family man but fails, as on one occasion he takes his baby for a walk but forgets her in the market. Frustrated, Sid asks for help from Trisha's brother-in-law Ranveer (Ram Kapoor), who is a typical family man. Ranveer reveals to him that when he gets frustrated, he makes a business trip excuse and stays in a hotel room to enjoy his life as a bachelor. Sid takes on his idea and starts staying in a hotel, with the excuse of working overnight in the studio. But soon he has to cut down on his idea, due to an added expense at home as Trisha decides to hire an expensive governess (Ila Arun). Sid, then, without telling Trisha, goes for a cheaper solution by shifting to a shared PG along with Manav (Vir Das), a dope-head bachelor. Sid takes Manav's advice and starts living a carefree life.

Then enters Shekhar (Purab Kohli), a young neighbour, who saves the baby when she gets locked in and thus frequently comes to meet Trisha, which makes Sid jealous. Sid realises the value of his family when Manav is hospitalised and none of his family or friends are around to take care of him. Filled with guilt, Sid confesses the PG secret to Trisha, who in anger throws him out. Sid seeks Ranveer's advice, only to discover that Ranveer is having an affair. Ranveer confronts Sid by telling him that he has also cheated Trisha by devoting time away from his family. Sid realises his mistake and after repeated apologies by Sid, Trisha reveals that she also got involved with Shekhar and is now pregnant. Sid rushes out of the house along with the baby and later he realises that he should forgive Trisha for their child and also because all these things happened because of him and thus forgives Trisha. Trisha surprises him by revealing that she is not pregnant with Shekhar's child, but with his. Sid and Trisha reunite and start living a happy family life along with their baby.

Towards the end, Sid is in the park playing with their two children and giving "Fatherhood Notes" to other fathers in the park. He calls Trisha to give her the good news that a music company has finally asked him to compose a song for their album. Trisha is now a working woman and tells Sid that she will be late because of a deal which needs to be completed. Sid says that he is fine to look after the kids until she returns. As the camera pans out, it shows Trisha relaxing in a hotel room with a glass of wine.

== Cast ==
- Farhan Akhtar as Siddharth "Sid" Roy, Trisha's husband
- Vidya Balan as Trisha Mallik Roy, Sid's wife
- Ram Kapoor as Ranveer Malhotra
- Vir Das as Manav, Sid's friend
- Gautami Kapoor as Aanchal Malhotra (Nee Mallik), Ranveer's wife
- Purab Kohli as Shekhar Parekh, Trisha's neighbour
- Nitesh Pandey as Madhok
- Ila Arun as Aunty (Hired Governess)
- Rati Agnihotri as Mrs. Mallik, Trisha's Mother
- Mukul Chadda (special appearance)
- Naveen Kaushik as Vikram 'Vicky'

== Release ==
The trailer of the film was released on 28 October 2013. The film was released on 28 February 2014.

== Critical reception ==
This movie bears resemblance to Hollywood movie She's Having a Baby. In pre-release commentary, Biswadeep Ghos said that as a sequel, "One can visualise Farhan as Rahul's Sid, but Vidya as Mallika's Trisha is tough to imagine."

Indian Express' Shubhra Gupta said marriage takes two, and the tango here is only from Sid's perspective : how about showing us what it could be like from Trisha's ?. Sneha May Francis writes Saket's narrative slumps innumerable times over the two-hour-and-twenty-five-minutes screen time. Madhureeta Mukherjee of The Times of India gave the film 3.5/5 and states that, "Single or married, this film will have more of a 'special effect' than 'side effect' on you."

== Box office ==
Box Office India stated the film started to an average to slow start, "Shaadi Ke Side Effects looks set to collect at premium multiplexes only as collections at even the good multiplexes outside metros the collections are very low,". Box Office India attributed the slow Friday sales to competition from the cricket match. In the second week, the box office collections dropped 85% from the first day collections. According to Box Office India, Friday had a collection of 57.0 million nett with Saturday showing a 40% increase. Collections dropped by 45% on Monday from its Friday release, collecting 28.5 million nett, for a four-day total of 235.0 million nett in India. Two week total bought Rs 360 million.

Overseas, the film went on to become third biggest grosser of 2014, collecting £131,463 in United Kingdom, $582,672 in United States and Canada, $500,000 in Gulf and $145,487 in Australia. Its first weekend total of $1,760,000 is equivalent to ₹ 109 million nett.

== Soundtrack ==
T-Series acquired the music rights for Shaadi Ke Side Effects. The music director is Pritam and the lyricist is Amitabh Bhattacharya. Mikey McCleary is a guest composer for the track "Ahista Ahista". Mayur Puri wrote the lyrics for the song Vyah Karke Pachhtaya. Music recording engineer was Sukumar Dutta. The song Desi Romance was inspired by Yeh Jawaani Hai Deewani background music. Music producer is Sanjoy.

Shaadi Ke Side Effects

Soundtrack album by Pritam
- Released: 19 February 2014
- Genre: Feature film soundtrack
- Length: 46:15
- Label: T-Series
- Producers: Ekta Kapoor; Shobha Kapoor; Pritish Nandy

Pritam chronology
Yaariyan (2014)	Shaadi Ke Side Effects (2014)	Holiday: A Soldier Is Never Off Duty (2014)

Track list
No.	Title	Lyrics	Singer(s)	Length
1.	"Harry's Not a Brahmachari"	Amitabh Bhattacharya	Jazzy B, Divya Kumar, Ishq Bector	4:18
2.	"I'm Sorry Par Tumse Pyar Ho Gaya" (The Hey Song; male)	Swanand Kirkire	Nikhil Paul George, Neeti Mohan, Mili Nair
3.	"Tauba Main Vyaah Karke Pachhtaya" (Hindi; male)	Mayur Puri	Shahid Mallya, Poorvi Koutish, Alamgir Khan
4.	"Desi Romance" (female, male)	Swanand Kirkire	Suchi, Arijit Singh
5.	"Yahaan Vahaan" (male)	Swanand Kirkire	Farhan Akhtar
6.	"Bawla Sa Sapna" (male)	Swanand Kirkire	Mohit Chauhan
7.	"Harry's Not a Brahmachari" (original song; male)	Amitabh Bhattacharya	Jazzy B, Ishq Bector
8.	"Tauba Main Vyaah Karke Pachhtaya" (Punjabi; male)	Mayur Puri	Arif Lohar, Poorvi Koutish, Shahid Mallya & Alamgir Khan
9.	"Bawla Sa Sapna" ("The Children Come To Sing"; female)	Swanand Kirkire	Diva
10.	"Yahaan Vahaan" (reprise; male)	Swanand Kirkire	Farhan Akhtar
11.	"Harry's Not a Brahmachari" (remix; male)	Amitabh Bhattacharya	Jazzy B & Divya Kumar
12.	"Ahista Ahista" (male)	Ankur Tiwari	Farhan Akhtar
Total length:				46:15
