= Kasak (2005 film) =

- Directed by: Rajiv Babbar
- Screenplay by: Rajiv Babbar; Sanjay Masoom; Neeraj Vora
- Dialogues by: Sanjay Masoom
- Story by: Rajiv Babbar
- Starring: Lucky Ali; Meera; Puneet Issar; Mukesh Tiwari
- Cinematography: Nadeem Khan
- Edited by: Zafar Sultan
- Music by: M. M. Kreem
- Production company: Archana Media Pvt. Ltd.
- Release date: 22 July 2005
- Country: India
- Language: Hindi

Kasak (English: Desire) is a 2005 Indian Hindi-language drama film directed by Rajiv Babbar, starring Lucky Ali and Meera.

== Plot ==
Amar and Anjali meet in a hospital where he takes care of an old lady who is in a coma. They fall deeply in love. When the old lady (who is very rich) awakens from coma, her son tries to get her will changed so that he is the sole beneficiary. Disgusted, she names Amar as the beneficiary and dies.

Amar doesn't want the money since he is happy with Anjali. But Anjali convinces him to take the money, claiming that he would be disrespecting the old lady's last wish by refusing. Amar and Anjali get married soon after. Once married, she convinces Amar to transfer the funds to her name. All Amar wants is her love and does so.

She shows her true colors soon after and throws him out. Even then, Amar is still in love with her and comes to her to convince her to keep the money but still be with him. He doesn't want the money. She realizes that Amar won't let her go and creates a false case of domestic abuse against Amar.

Amar gets jailed, and when he comes out, he becomes the bodyguard of a criminal Don. Soon Amar becomes a big criminal and becomes very rich.

But he is still in love with Anjali and constantly tries to contact her while she keeps on humiliating him. Finally, she plots to kill him and seemingly succeeds. But she is exposed and gets jailed. In jail, she is shocked to see Amar visiting her, who tells her that he realized that she would stop at nothing. And she has never understood his love and always mistreated him. He found out about her plot to kill him and pretended to be killed. Now she will be in jail forever and be the only person who knows that he is still alive. Hopefully she will then love him. Amar then gives up his criminal life and starts working with orphans.

== Cast ==
- Lucky Ali as Amar
- Meera as Anjali
- Puneet Issar as Captain Paras Singh
- Mukesh Tiwari as Raunak Singh
- Vikas Anand as Dr Mohan Bakshi
- Anil Nagrath as Pursottham
- Amit Behl as Gayatri Devi ka beta
- Mukesh Ahuja as Subu
- Rana Jung Bahadur as Inspector Ashish Vidyarthi

== Soundtrack ==
- Jaana Hai Jaana Hai (Madhusree)
- Saansein Madham Hain
- Todh Diya Hai
- Yeh Zindagi Hai
- Jaana Hai Jaana Hai - Part II
- Jaana Hai Jaana Hai - Par III
- Main Na Janoo Kaisi Kasak Hai
- Chandni Hai Khoi Khoi
- Bechainiyon Mein Lamha

Music director M.M. Kreem composed this soundtrack which was received well. He reused tune of his Telugu film song "Nuvve Naa Shwasa" from "Okariki Okaru" for "Saansein Maddham Hai" & "Bechainiyon Mein Lamha".

== Reception ==
Taran Adarsh of IndiaFM gave the film one out of five, writing, "Lucky Ali is strictly okay in a role that doesn't really give him a chance to display histrionics. If Meera was average in NAZAR, Meera is awful in her second Hindi film. Her English diction is faulty, her wardrobe outrageous and her makeup garish. Mukesh Tiwari is wasted. Ditto for Puneet Issar. On the whole, KASAK is a poor show. At the box-office, it's a non-starter!" Indrani Roy Mitra of Rediff.com wrote, "Is director Rajiv Babbar completely out of his mind? How dare he play with Krzysztof Kieślowski's White, one of the best from the master, and give it treatment that would have certainly made the late Polish filmmaker give up his profession?
