= Karanji (film) =

Kaaranji
- Directed by: Shreedhar
- Written by: Shreedhar
- Produced by: M. N. Suresh
- Starring: Vijay Raghavendra; Gauri Karnik
- Edited by: Sanath Kumar; Suresh S A
- Release date: 12 June 2009
- Running time: 148 minutes
- Country: India
- Language: Kannada

Kaaranji is 2009 Indian Kannada language musical drama film directed by debutante director Shreedhar. It stars Vijay Raghavendra and Bollywood actress Gauri Karnik. This is a story of five youngsters who are passionate about music. The music of the film was composed by Veer Samarth.

== Plot ==
It's the story of a band troupe, headed by Viji (Vijay Raghavendra), which struggles to grow as it faces one problem after the other. First, it faces embarrassment in a hotel when the band members sing a Kannada number. Then there is rift among the members when Viji gets to know Vasumathi (Gauri Karnik). The troupe also faces the problem of finding a female singer for 'Music Challenge 2008' contest. But it comes out of all the problems and wins laurels.

== Cast ==
- Vijaya Raghavendra as Viji
- Gauri Karnik as Vasumathi
- Cudavalli Chandrashekar
- Sudha Belawadi
- Arvind Shreedhar
- Nanjunda
- Raj
- Chetan
- Chandan

== Music ==
The score for this film by Veer Samarth, a promising newcomer in Kannada film Industry. Film has 14 tracks based on works of popular writers like Santha Shishunala Sharif, T. P. Kailasam, N.K. Hanumanthaiah, Dr. H.S. Venkateshamurthy, Chi. Udaya Shankar, Satish Tiptur, Raghavendra Kamath, Sridhar and S.S. Kulkarni.

Track list
No.	Title	Lyrics	Singer(s)	Length
1.	"Kumabarikiki Kumbariki"	Sant Shishunal Sharief	Sukhwinder Singh	4:47
2.	"Ee Dina Hosathagide"	Satish Tiptoor	Karthik	4:42
3.	"Ninna Hallige Bandu"	Raghavendra Kamath	Raghu Dixit	4:12
4.	"Ee Thampu Gali"	Raghavendra Kamath	Hariharan, B. Jayashree, Fayaz Khan	4:49
5.	"Naadad Impoo"	Shridhar	Apoorva Shridhar	1:20
6.	"Kaaranji Theme Music"		Santhosh Venky, Vyasraj Sosale	1:10
7.	"Yaaru Haadada"	H.S. Venkateshmurthy	Hariharan	5:12
8.	"Murida Marada"	N.K. Hanumanthayya	Vijay Prakash, Apoorva Shridhar	5:13
9.	"Rockbond ThemeMusic"			1:38
10.	"Kumbarikiki Ki - (Band Version)"		Sukhwinder Singh	4:50

== Reception ==
A critic from The Times of India wrote that "Director Sridhar could have done a better job of a lively story, but has ended up with boring narration, silly sequences and a crude script. With Vijaya Raghavendra in the lead, the director can't be excused for the mediocre flow of the story, which needs to be cut by at least 30 minutes". R. G. Vijayasarathy of IANS wrote that "Karanjji is a film recommended for the musically inclined younger minds".
