= Lucky Ali =

Indian singer, songwriter and actor (born 1958)

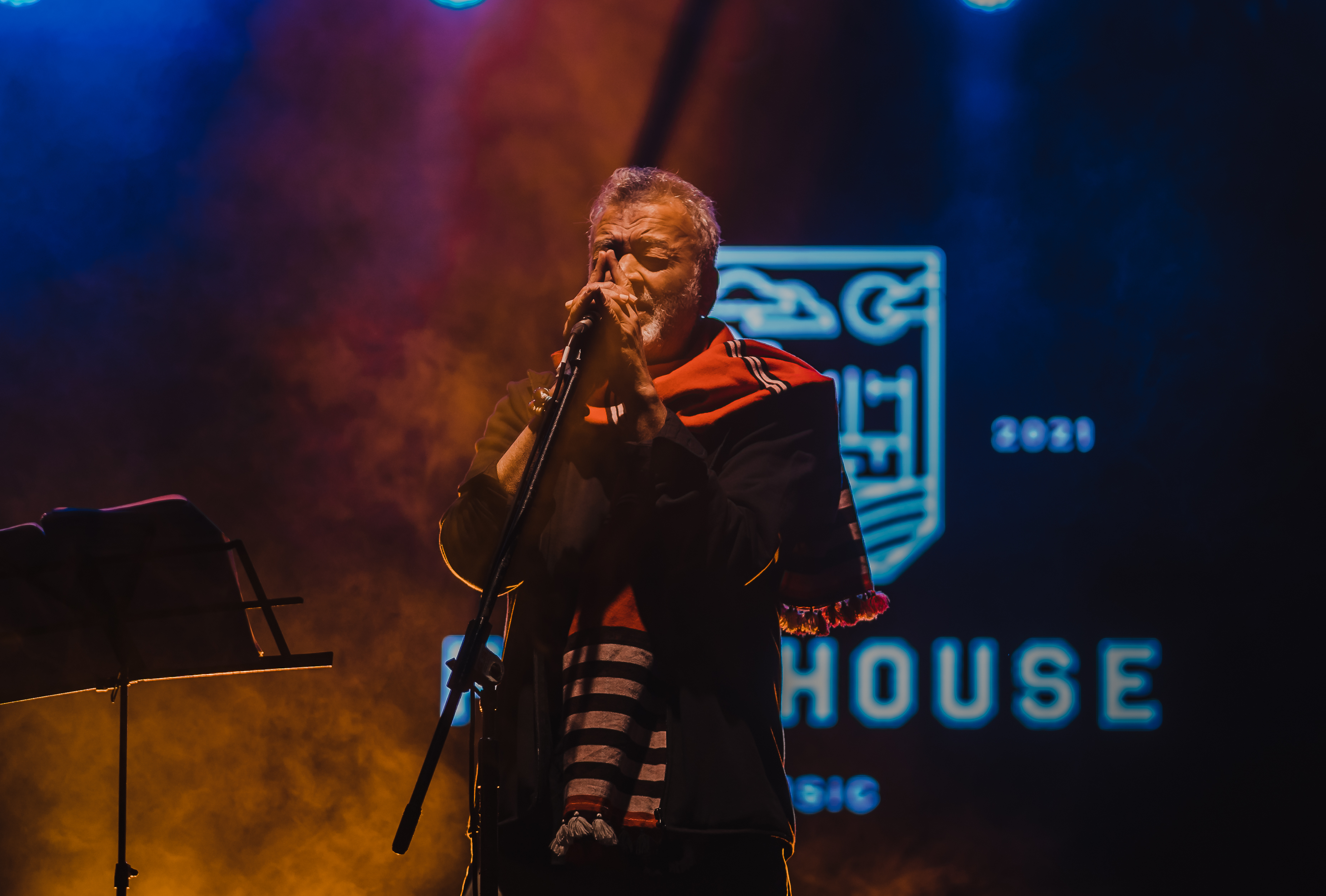
- Ali at Majuli Music Festival 2022

Background information
- Also known as: Lucky Ali
- Born: Maqsood Mahmood Ali; 19 September 1958 (age 68); Bangalore, Karnataka, India
- Genres: Indipop; folk; bollywood
- Occupations: Singer; songwriter; record producer; actor
- Instruments: Vocals, guitar
- Years active: 1978–present
- Labels: Crescendo Music; Sony; Universal Music; Zee Records; T-Series; Lucky Ali Entertainment

Maqsood Mahmood "Lucky" Ali (born 19 September 1958) is an Indian singer, songwriter, and actor. With several popular singles and albums, he emerged as a significant figure of Indipop during the 1990s.

== Early life and education ==
Ali is the second of the eight children of Bollywood actor, Mehmood Ali. His mother, actress Mah Laqa, was part Bengali and part Pashtun, and the younger sister of 1960s Indian Bollywood actress Meena Kumari, He was born in 1958 at Bangalore, Karnataka. The Bollywood actress and dancer, Minoo Mumtaz, was his paternal aunt. He attended City Montessori School, Convent of Jesus and Mary, Hampton Court, Mussoorie, St. George's College, Mussoorie, Manekji Cooper (Kindergarten) (Juhu), Bombay Scottish School in Mumbai, and the Bishop Cotton Boys' School, Bangalore.

=== Connection with Tagore family ===
His mother Mah Laqa's grandmother, Hem Sundari Tagore, was either the daughter or a widow of Rabindranath Tagore's distant cousin. After the death of her husband, she was forced by his family to leave for Meerut, where she became a nurse, married a Christian named Pyare Lal Shakir Meeruti (1880–1956), who was an Urdu journalist, and embraced Christianity. She had two daughters; one of whom was Prabhavati, Ali's maternal grandmother.

== Personal life ==
Ali has two children with his first wife Meaghan Jane McCleary – Ta'awwuz and Tasmiyah. He then married Inaya (Anahita, a Persian). With her, he has two children: Sara and Raiyan. He married a third time in 2010 to British model and former beauty queen Kate Elizabeth Hallam whom he divorced in 2017. The couple has a son named Dani Maqsood Ali.

Ali currently lives on the outskirts of Bengaluru in his farm house. His Mother Tongue Deccani Dakhni Urdu.

Ali and his father shared a tempestuous relationship. Mehmood Ali was a very busy actor in the 1960s and '70s, and remained away from home for his shoots. Once, around the age of four when Ali first returned from boarding school, Mehmood and the entire family had come to receive Ali at the airport. Ali did not recognize his father, but on seeing him said, "He's the film comedian Mehmood!" Ali lived away from his family in a St George's College boarding school in Dehradun, Mussoorie. Ali's tryst with marijuana led Mehmood to write the script of the movie Dushman Duniya Ka (Enemy of the World). The movie stars Ali's youngest brother, Manzoor. It is the story of the drug abuse of a young man called Lucky. In the end, the young man kills his mother, destroys everything around him and is then killed by his father. Ali differed from his father's vision and did not act in the movie. "I felt the story lacked hope," he said. However, he sang his first song for the film.

Best known for his music, singing and acting, Ali has also bred horses, worked on an oil rig off the coast of Pondicherry in South India, cleaned and sold carpets and is a farmer with a strong opinion on organic methods in farming.

== Personal albums ==
Ali made his debut on the Indian music scene with the album Sunoh, which established him as a singer. This album won many of the top awards in Indian music, including the Best Pop Male Vocalist at the 1996 Screen Awards and the Channel V Viewers Choice Award in 1997. It stayed on the MTV Asia Charts in the top three for 60 weeks. The song "O Sanam" from Sunoh launched his career. It was also nominated at the 1997 MTV Video Music Awards His next album, Sifar, was noted for its music, lyrics and vocals.

Ali became known for his distinctive music style and also for his untrained voice - elements that helped him emerge as a leading figure in Indipop during the period. His third and fourth albums were Aks and Kabhi Aisa Lagta Hai, both of which were reasonably successful. He is also known for contributing the song "Anjaani Raahon Mein" to the album Meri Jaan Hindustan, which commemorated 50 years of Indian independence in the year 1997. The video was directed by Mani Shankar, and features him as a young rural man working in a foreign country, with a longing to go back home, and his joy of actually returning to a place he loved. When asked about the video, he once said "The video of 'Anjaani Raahon Mein' was a beautiful story in itself. It was done straight from the heart and it is very special to me."

== Bollywood career ==
Ali debuted in Bollywood with the song "Nasha Nasha" in the movie Dushman Duniya Ka. After that he sang "Ek Pal Ka Jeena" and "Na Tum Jaano Na Hum", featured in Kaho Naa... Pyaar Hai (2000). He received the 2001 Filmfare Award for Best Male Playback Singer for "Ek Pal Ka Jeena" song. He was nominated for the Best Playback Singer Male for "Aa Bhi Jaa", featured in Sur at the 48th Filmfare Awards, but lost to Sonu Nigam. He has lent his voice to playback singing in films such as Sur – The Melody of Life (2002), Bachna Ae Haseeno (2008), Anjaana Anjaani (2010) and Tamasha (2015).

== Playback singing career ==
Lucky Ali started his playback singing career with the song "Walking All Alone" from the film Ek Baap Chhe Bete in 1978. This film stars Mehmood Ali and his six sons. Ali's second song was "Nasha Nasha" from the film Dushman Duniya Ka, which starred his brother Manzoor Ali in the lead role. The film was directed by their father Mehmood.

He has worked with composers such as A.R Rahman, Vishal Bhardwaj, Vishal–Shekhar, Mikey McCleary, Prashant Pillai, Varun Ahuja.

== Acting career ==
As the nephew of Meena Kumari and son of Mehmood, Lucky Ali did not lack the requisites to make his debut as an actor. He first appeared in Chote Nawab ("The Little Prince") in 1962, directed by Mehmood. He acted in a few films in the 1970s and 1980s such as Yehi Hai Zindagi (1977), Hamare Tumhare (1979) and Shyam Benegal's Trikaal (1985). He also acted in the television series Bharat Ek Khoj, directed by Shyam Benegal. After a long break from acting, he returned in Sanjay Gupta's Kaante (2002), in which he acted alongside leading stars Amitabh Bachchan, Sanjay Dutt, Kumar Gaurav and Suniel Shetty. Ali also acted in the TV serial Zara Hatke. In 2002, he acted in the Hindi musical Sur-The Melody of Life playing a complex role.

== Discography ==
Ali's discography contains six studio albums, six compilations, seven singles, 19 soundtracks, two concert tours and two other albums (as a composer).

=== Studio albums ===
- Sunoh (1996)
- Sifar (1998)
- Aks (2001)
- Gori Teri Aankhen... (2001)
- Kabhi Aisa Lagta Hai (2004)
- Xsuie (2009)
- Raasta Man (2011)
- Subaah Ke Taare (2024)

=== Soundtrack ===
- Drishyam: The Conclusion (2026)
- Tu Meri Main Tera Main Tera Tu Meri (2025)
- Do Aur Do Pyaar (2024)
- From The Land of Gandhi (2016)
- Tamasha (2015)
- Tere Mere Sath (2014)
- Amen
- DAVID (2013)
- Dev S/O of Mudde Gowda (2011)
- Anjaana Anjaani (2010)
- Paathshaala (2010) - 2 songs
- Bachna Ae Haseeno (2008)
- Kaalai (2008)
- Vellitherai (2008)
- The Film (2005)
- Yuva (2004)
- Anand (2004)
- Aayutha Ezhuthu (2004)
- Sye (2004)
- Chupke Se (2003)
- Boys (2003)
- Sur – The Melody of Life (2002)
- Kaante (2002)
- Kaho Naa... Pyaar Hai (2000)
- Bhopal Express (1999)
- Dushman Duniya Ka (1996)

== Filmography ==
=== Films ===
Year	Film	Role	Notes
1962	Chote Nawaab		child artist
1974	Kunwara Baap		child artist
1977	Yehi Hai Zindagi	Dinesh	
1976	Ginny Aur Johnny	Man in Car	
1978	Ek Baap Chhe Bete	Lucky	
1979	Hamare Tumhare	Ajay	
1985	Trikaal	Erasmo	
2002	Sur-The Melody of Life	Vikramaditya Singh	
2002	Kaante	Maqbool "Mak" Haider	
2005	Kasak	Amar	
2008	Good Luck!	Tarun Chopra	
2009	Runaway	Khalid	
2021	Murder at Teesri Manzil 302	Inspector Tejender Singh	Delayed release; Filmed in 2008–2009

=== Television series ===
Year	Title	Role	Notes
1986	Katha Sagar		
1988	Bharat Ek Khoj	Various characters	
1994	Zara Hatke	Malu	
2013	The Dewarists	Himself	

== Awards and nominations ==
Year	Category	Song	Result
Channel V Music Awards
1996	Best Male Pop Vocalist	"O Sanam" from Sunoh	Won
1998	Best Male Pop Vocalist	"Dekha Hai Aise Bhi" from Sifar	Won
2000	Best Male Pop Vocalist	"Tere Mere Saath" from Aks	Nominated
Channel V Viewer Choice Awards
1997	Best Indian Male Pop Vocalist	"O Sanam" from Sunoh	Won
Screen Awards
1996	Best Male Pop Vocalist	"O Sanam" from Sunoh	Won
1998	Best Male Pop Vocalist	"Dekha Hai Aise Bhi" from Sifar	Nominated

== See also ==
- Mehmood Ali Family
