= Sapna Bhavnani =

Indian reality TV personality

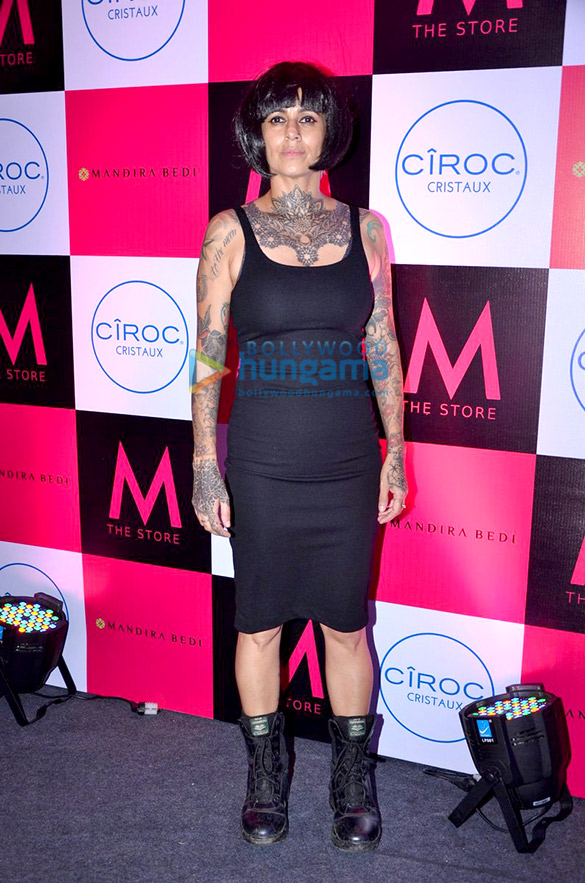
- Sapna Bhavnani in 2015
- Born: Mumbai, Maharashtra, India
- Occupations: Actress, Hairstylist
- Years active: 2003–present
- Known for: Bigg Boss 6

Sapna Bhavnani is an Indian actress and hairstylist.

== Early life ==
Sapna Bhavnani was born in Mumbai and raised in Bandra where she completed high school. She had a reputation as a good student and was tomboyish in her childhood. She rode to school on a motorcycle and liked to pull pranks. Her father, who was a businessman, died when she was 18.

Following her father's death, her family started facing financial difficulties. Bhavnani then decided to drop out of her college in Mumbai and move to the United States. Her Indian-American aunt helped her with her immigration to Chicago in 1989. In Chicago, Bhavnani initially worked as a waitress before enrolling herself as a student at a business school. She graduated with a double major in Marketing and Communication and a minor in Public Speaking from Chicago's Barat College. Bhavnani also experimented with fashion design. She then developed an interest in hairdressing and took it up as a profession. In 2002, Bhavnani visited India after six years and happened to reconnect with an old boyfriend and decided to move back to India.

== Career ==
=== Hairstyling ===
After struggling to establish herself in Mumbai, Bhavnani initially did job as a hairdresser for a salon called "Juice" and also started working as a Bollywood stylist. She also began writing as a columnist for the newspaper Mumbai Mirror for three years before moving on to another called MiD DAY. In 2004, she opened her first hair salon called Mad-O-Wot in Mumbai, with a team of five people. In 2011, Bhavnani started her second salon in Andheri, Mumbai.

Bhavnani has worked with celebrity clients from a range of fields across entertainment, sports, politics and business. Her clients include Priyanka Chopra, Katrina Kaif, Bipasha Basu, Hrithik Roshan, Mahendra Singh Dhoni, Virat Kohli, John Abraham, Siddharth Mallya, Mandira Bedi, Dino Morea and Gauri Khan. In 2011, she worked with the actor Ranveer Singh for the film Ladies vs Ricky Bahl.

=== Acting and production ===
Bhavnani set up a production company called Mad-O-Wot Productions in June 2010, aimed at making music videos, commercials, and short films. In July 2010, Bhavnani worked on Project Unite, which attempted to re-record the Indian national anthem with a music video featuring common Indian people on the streets. Bhavnani was one of the nine people who gave vocals to the track, along with Raghu Ram, Sugandha Garg and Avani Shah among others from the field of entertainment and hairstyling industry. The video was released on 15 August 2010, India's Independence Day.

In October 2010, her production house released a music video called raat, with a Mumbai-based band named Airport. Bhavnani also acted in the video. Mad-O-Wot productions' next project was the music video/film called Snare which was released in March 2011. In April 2011, she released a music-based project as a promotional feature for her Mad-O-Wot brand, which she co-directed with Arijit Datta, that featured Raghu Ram and Rajiv Laxman. Bhavnani next directed a music video in June 2011 for Kailash Kher's single Amber Tak Yahi Naad Goonjega. The track was a dedication to Anna Hazare's anti-corruption movement. In May 2012, she released a dramatic musical video, Ruh, in collaboration with Arijit Datta Projects. In November 2020 she appeared in a kashmiri music video 'JANAAN' under the label of zee music company.

Bhavnani featured in a 2006 Hindi film Pyaar Ke Side Effects. In August 2008, she did a cameo role in Ugly Aur Pagli.

=== Reality television ===
Bhavnani participated in an Indian celebrity reality TV show, Bigg Boss Season 6 on the TV channel Colors in 2012. Bhavnani was nominated for eviction eight times during her stay in the house. She was saved by the public vote seven times.

A week before the finale, Bhavnani was evicted from the show in January 2013, after spending 90 days in the Bigg Boss house and stated that winning the show was never her aim. During her stay in the house, she gave almost every contestant a haircut and a makeover.

=== Theatre ===
Bhavnani was part of a play titled NIRBHAYA, which premiered at the prestigious Edinburgh Fringe Festival in August 2013. It won the Amnesty International Freedom of Expression Award given to an outstanding Fringe production which raises awareness of human rights. It also won the Scotsman Fringe First and the Herald Angel Award for Outstanding New Play. The play is based on real-life events and gender-based violence like the 2012 Delhi gang rape and murder. The play was written and directed by playwright and director Yael Farber.

=== Fashion ===
In November 2011, Bhavnani created fashion line Kathorian, in collaboration with fashion designer Sukriti Grover. The collection was showcased at the August 2012 Lakme Fashion Week. The label is inspired by Victorian influences and the Indian dance form Kathakali.

=== Notable projects ===
- Bhavnani hosted a few short episodes of a comedy entertainment web show called The Speedy Gonsalez Show on her official YouTube channel in August 2009. She pretended to be a wasted and promiscuous Mexican man living in India, where her guests used to give performances.
- In September 2009, Bhavnani authored a non-fiction self-help book titled Style-O-Wot, targeted to teen girls, in which she gives tips related to fashion, trends and style. The book was published by Scholastic India and was marketed under children's books section.
- Bhavnani organized an art project called Kalingar at Zenzi in Bandra, Mumbai in June 2011 which was a fusion of hair, fashion, and photography, along with designer Masaba Gupta and photographer Joy Dutta.
- Bhavnani has actively endorsed PETA's cause for humane approach to animals and in July 2011 she acted in and modeled for a short promotional ad film, with the tag line "Cut hair, not frogs", to send out her message. The project was produced by PETA India. She also did a commercial for PETA in January 2013. With the slogan "Ink not Mink – Be comfortable in your own skin and let animals keep theirs." She shot this advertisement in the nude.

== Filmography ==
=== Films ===
Year	Film	Role	Notes
2006	Pyaar Ke Side Effects	Nina	
2008	Ugly Aur Pagli	Sindhustan	

=== Television ===
Year	Name	Role	Notes	Ref
2012–13	Bigg Boss 6	Contestant		

== Personal life ==
Bhavnani is known for her fashion style, tattoos and piercings, and her pixie-like cropped hair, inspired by goth and punk-rock styles. She maintains that she is a tomboy at heart. Her immediate family consists of her mother, who lives in Mumbai and two brothers. Bhavnani is fond of cats.

Bhavnani has had three failed marriages in the past. She divorced her first husband, a German, after about a year of marriage, claiming that her mother-in-law was racist towards her. Her second marriage was to the Indian man for whom she relocated from the United States to India. Bhavnani had dated him in her teens. Bhavnani divulged that she became a victim of domestic violence and walked out after four months of marriage. Her third marriage was to Indian model Sameer Malhotra which also ended in a divorce within a year.

She also used to be romantically involved with a Mumbai-based singer-songwriter Arijit Datta. At a web-interview on In.com, she said that while doing the show Bigg Boss, she got attracted to an Indian model, Niketan Madhok, who was her co-contestant.
