= Kabhi Aisa Lagta Hai =

Studio album by Lucky Ali
- Released: June 21, 2004
- Genre: World, Folk
- Length: 35:19
- Label: T-Series

Lucky Ali chronology
Aks (2001)	Kabhi Aisa Lagta Hai (2004)	Xsuie (2009)

Kabhi Aisa Lagta Hai (Hindi: कभी ऐसा लगता है, Urdu: کبھی ایسا لگتا ہے) is the fourth solo album by Indian singer Lucky Ali. After delivering hits like "O Sanam", "Dekha Hai Aise Bhi", and "Tere Mere Saath", the soulful singer tried something different in its title track. Quite unlike his usual style, this album is more experimental with different styles. 'Jabse Mili Tumse' is a refreshing composition which talks about the innocence and confusion of falling in love. The song "Teri Yaad Jab Aati Hai" is an assurance that love does not die

== Track listing ==
No.	Title	Length
1.	"Kabhi Aisa Lagta Hai"
2.	"Teri Yaad Jab Aati Hai"
3.	"Jabse Mili Tumse"
4.	"Tanhaai Mein Basi"
5.	"Ek Pal Mein Hai"
6.	"Ye Dil Deewana Hai"
7.	"Kabhi Aisa Lagta Hai" (Instrumental)
8.	"Thappa Thappi Chhuppa Chhuppi"
9.	"Kabhi Aisa Lagta Hai" (Instrumental, Radio Edit)

== See also ==
- Lucky Ali discography
