= Mohan Rajan =

Indian lyricist

- Born: 26 September 1984 (age 42); Meikalnaikanpatti
- Citizenship: India
- Education: Loyola College, Chennai
- Occupation: Lyricist
- Years active: 2009-present

Mohan Rajan is an Indian lyricist working on Tamil language films.

== Career ==
Hailing from Meikalnaikanpatti near Thottiyam, Trichy, Mohan Rajan arrived in Chennai in 2001, hoping to become a lyricist in the Tamil film industry. However, he failed to get a breakthrough and instead qualified himself by pursuing master's degree in Tamil literature and later media arts at Loyola College, Chennai. Mohan Rajan was launched as a lyricist by James Vasanthan during the making of Yathumaagi (2010). Soon after the release of the song, he became acquainted with Vasanthan's friend, the film-maker Sasikumar, who began to regularly hand lyric-writing assignments to Mohan for his projects. Notably, he wrote the song "Jilla Vittu" from Easan (2010) and then "Kondaadum Manasu" from Sundarapandian (2012) for Sasikumar's projects. Mohan studied in PSBB school, Chennai

Mohan Rajan's breakthrough song was "Kanave Kanave", a pathos song featured in Bejoy Nambiar's anthology film David (2013), featuring Vikram and Jiiva. The song was composed and sung by Anirudh Ravichander. Since his breakthrough, he has worked on albums including Ilaiyaraaja's Tharai Thappattai (2016), the composer's thousandth album, which Bala chose him for after being impressed with his work in Chandi Veeran (2015). He later wrote popular songs such as "Yaanji Yaanji" in Vikram Vedha (2017), as well as songs in Kodiveeran (2017) and Padaiveeran (2018).

== As lyricist ==
=== Films ===
| Year | Film | Songs | Composer | Singers | Notes |
|---|---|---|---|---|---|
| 2009 | Bayam Ariyaan | All songs | P. C. Shivan | | |
| 2010 | Yaathumagi | "Pesum Minsaaram" | James Vasanthan | Benny Dayal | |
| 2010 | Easan | "Jilla Veettu" | James Vasanthan | Thanjai Selvi | |
| 2011 | Marudhavelu | "Thokkanam Kuruvi Kudu" | James Vasanthan | Ananth, Sangeetha | |
| 2011 | Marudhavelu | "Vaarome Kanavodu" | James Vasanthan | Velmurugan | |
| 2011 | Marudhavelu | "Yetho Yetho" | James Vasanthan | Mathangi Jagdish | |
| 2011 | Sankarankovil | "Thenpadi Makkalin" | Rajini | Sriram | |
| 2011 | Sankarankovil | "Enga Kulasami" | Rajini | Rajini | |
| 2012 | Sundarapandian | "Kondaadum Manasu" | N. R. Raghunanthan | Anand Aravindakshan | |
| 2013 | David | "Vaazhkaye" (The Theme of David) | Bramfatura | Siddharth Basrur | |
| 2013 | David | "Kanave Kanave" | Anirudh Ravichander | Anirudh Ravichander | |
| 2013 | David | "Mannamey" | Prashant Pillai, Tao Issaro | Karthik | |
| 2013 | David | "Theerathu Poga Poga Vaanam" | Maatibaani | Nirali Kartik, Joyshanti | Co-written with Joyshanti |
| 2013 | David | "Machi" | Modern Mafia | Sanjeev Thomas | |
| 2013 | David | "Light House Symphony" | Remo Fernandes | Instrumental | Co-written with Remo Fernandes |
| 2013 | Kutti Puli | "Thaattiyare Thaattiyare" | Ghibran | Gold Devaraj | |
| 2017 | Tharai Thappattai | "Vadhana Vadhana Vadivelane" | Ilaiyaraaja | Kavitha Gopi, Priyadarshini | |
| 2017 | Muthina Kathirika | "Aacha Pocha" | Siddharth Vipin | Anthony Daasan | |
| 2017 | Muthina Kathirika | "Summa Sollakoodathu" | Siddharth Vipin | Jagadeesh Kumar | |
| 2017 | Muthina Kathirika | "Enakkenna Aacho" | Siddharth Vipin | Aandhi Joshi | |
| 2017 | Muthina Kathirika | "Aahaa Ooho Electionee" | Siddharth Vipin | Guru | |
| 2017 | Kadhalum Kadandhu Pogum | "Ka Ka Ka Po" | Santhosh Narayanan | Santhosh Narayanan | |
| 2017 | Jackson Durai | "Yethetho" | Siddharth Vipin | Chinmayi, Karthik | |
| 2017 | Vikram Vedha | "Yaanji Yaanji" | Sam CS | Anirudh Ravichander, Shakthisree Gopalan, Sathyaprakash | |
| 2017 | Kodiveeran | "Ayyo Adi Aathe" | N.R.Raghunanthan | Jagadeesh, Vandana Srinivasan | |
| 2018 | Kalakalappu 2 | "Karaikudi Ilavarasi" | Hiphop Tamizha | Jassie Gift, Sudharshan Ashok | |
| 2018 | Kalakalappu 2 | "Thaarumaaru" | Hiphop Tamizha | Sanjith Hegde, Sniggy, Hiphop Tamizha | Co-written with Hiphop Tamizha |
| 2018 | Kalakalappu 2 | "Pudichiruka Illa Pudikalaya" | Hiphop Tamizha | Hiphop Tamizha, Varun Parandhaman, Rajan Chelliah | Co-written with Hiphop Tamizha |
| 2018 | Kalakalappu 2 | "Krishna Mukundha" | Hiphop Tamizha | Kaushik Krish, Padmalatha, Velmurugan | |
| 2018 | Raja Ranguski | "Gift Of Life" | Yuvan Shankar Raja | Silambarasan | |
| 2018 | Raja Ranguski | "Kadhal Gaana" | Yuvan Shankar Raja | Faridha | |
| 2018 | Raja Ranguski | "Mr. X" | Yuvan Shankar Raja | V. M. Mahalingham | |
| 2018 | Pyaar Prema Kaadhal | "Kaatre Un Kaaladiyai" | Yuvan Shankar Raja | Yuvan Shankar Raja | |
| 2018 | Padaiveeran | "Kombadhi Kombanadaa" | Karthik Raja | Mukesh | |
| 2018 | Ezhumin | "Minmini Kootame" | Ganesh Chandrasekaran | Jagadeesh, Yamini Ghantasala | |
| 2018 | Kanaa | "Oonjala Oonjala " | Dhibu Ninan Thomas | Niranjana Ramanan, Sid Sriram | |
| 2018 | Kanaa | "Savaal" | Dhibu Ninan Thomas | Dhibu Ninan Thomas, Arunraja Kamaraj, Rabbit Mac | |
| 2019 | Sivappu Manjal Pachai | "Raakaachi Rangamma" | Siddhu Kumar | Anitha Karthikeyan | |
| 2019 | Sivappu Manjal Pachai | "Usure" | Siddhu Kumar | Sudharshan Ashok, Jothi Pushpa | |
| 2019 | Sivappu Manjal Pachai | "Idhudhaan" | Siddhu Kumar | Naresh Iyer, Shashaa Tirupati | |
| 2019 | Sivappu Manjal Pachai | "Aazhi Soozhndha" | Siddhu Kumar | Sreekanth Hariharan | |
| 2019 | Kaaviyyan | "Ethuvandha Enna" | Syam Mohan | Ananthu, Dhivakar | |
| 2019 | Champion | "Vaa Maganey" | Arrol Corelli | Haricharan | |
| 2020 | Varmaa | "Enthan Kannile" | Radhan | Ranjith | |
| 2020 | Varmaa | "Mazhai Illai Megham Illai" | Radhan | Priyanka NK | |
| 2020 | Varmaa | "Aazhiyin Nadhiye" | Radhan | Ramya NSK | |
| 2020 | Varmaa | "Poguthe Kaalame" | Radhan | Jithan | |
| 2020 | Doctor | "Nenjame" | Anirudh Ravichander | Anirudh Ravichander | |
| 2021 | Aranmanai 3 | "Rasavaachiye" | C. Sathya | Sid Sriram | |
| 2021 | Aranmanai 3 | "Lojaku Mojaku" | C. Sathya | Mukesh | |
| 2021 | Oh Manapenne! | "Oh Manapenne" | Vishal Chandrashekhar | Sinduri Vishal | |
| 2021 | Oh Manapenne! | "Lazy song" | Vishal Chandrashekhar | Sinduri Vishal, Lady Kash | |
| 2021 | Oh Manapenne! | "Aao Ji Aao" | Vishal Chandrashekhar | Gana Bala | |
| 2021 | Oh Manapenne! | "Sakiye" | Vishal Chandrashekhar | Yazin Nizar | |
| 2022 | 777 Charlie (Tamil) | "Travel Song" | Nobin Paul | Jassie Gift, Aravind Karneeswaran | |
| 2022 | O2 | "Swasamae" | Vishal Chandrashekhar | Brindha Sivakumar | |
| 2023 | Good Night | "Naan Gaali" | Sean Roldan | Sean Roldan, Kalyani Nair | |
| 2023 | Good Night | "Chill Makka" | Sean Roldan | Pradeep Kumar | |
| 2023 | Good Night | "PalaPattra" | Sean Roldan | Deva | |
| 2023 | Good Night | "Po" | Sean Roldan | Sean Roldan | |
| 2023 | Good Night | "Arukaani Angamma" | Sean Roldan | Meenakshi Elayaraja | |
| 2023 | Good Night | "Anbirkum" | Sean Roldan | M. Lalitha Sudha | |
| 2023 | Good Night | "Naan Gaali (Reprise)" | Sean Roldan | Sean Roldan | |
| 2023 | Kolai | "Nesam Maruma" | Girishh G. | Anjana Rajagopalan | |
| 2023 | Animal (Tamil) | "Nee Vaadi" | Pritam, JAM8 | Raghav Chaitanya | |
| 2023 | Animal (Tamil) | "Pogaadhe" | Shreyas Puranik | Karthik | |
| 2023 | Animal (Tamil) | "Nee En Ulagam" | Harshavardhan Rameshwar | Sonu Nigam | |
| 2023 | Animal (Tamil) | "Nee En Ulagam" (R. P. Krishaang) | Harshavardhan Rameshwar | Sonu Nigam | |
| 2023 | Animal (Tamil) | "Yaar Yaaro" | Vishal Mishra | Vishal Mishra | |
| 2023 | Animal (Tamil) | "Yaar Yaaro(Soul Version)" | Vishal Mishra | Vishal Mishra | |
| 2023 | Animal (Tamil) | "Theeraadha" | Manan Bhardwaj | Shreya Ghoshal, Yazin Nizar | |
| 2023 | Animal (Tamil) | "Moochchaangoode" | Jaani | Mahalingam | |
| 2023 | Animal (Tamil) | "Moochchaangoode(Extended Film Version)" | Jaani | Mahalingam | |
| 2024 | Lover | "Thaensudare" | Sean Roldan | Sean Roldan, Shakthisree Gopalan | |
| 2024 | Lover | "Usura Uruvi" | Sean Roldan | Santhosh Narayanan | |
| 2024 | Lover | "Velagaadha" | Sean Roldan | Kapil Kapilan, Aparna Harikumar | |
| 2024 | Lover | "Uyir Vaasame" | Sean Roldan | G. V. Prakash Kumar | |
| 2024 | Lover | "Ezhutha Kadhaiyo" | Sean Roldan | Sean Roldan, Meha Agarwal | |
| 2024 | Lover | "Thaensudare (Reprise)" | Sean Roldan | Pradeep Kumar | |
| 2024 | Demonte Colony 2 | "Naraga Melangal" | Sam C. S. | Sam C. S. | |
| 2024 | Demonte Colony 2 | "Naan Kaanum Kaan" | Sam C. S. | Shweta Mohan | |
| 2024 | Demonte Colony 2 | "Nodigaley" | Sam C. S. | Sam C. S., Iykki Berry | Co-written with Iykki Berry |
| 2024 | Demonte Colony 2 | "Mirugan" | Sam C. S. | Sam C. S. | |
| 2024 | Virundhu | "Kana Kana Vizhiyoram" | Ratheesh Vegha | Sharanya Srinivas | |
| 2024 | Virundhu | "Sakka Podu Podu" | Saanand George Grace | Jagatheesh | |
| 2024 | Lubber Pandhu | "Chillanjirukkiye" | Sean Roldan | Pradeep Kumar, Sivaangi Krishnakumar | |
| 2024 | Lubber Pandhu | "Aasa Orave" | Sean Roldan | Sean Roldan | |
| 2024 | Lubber Pandhu | "Damma Goli" | Sean Roldan | Gana Settu | |
| 2024 | Miss You | "Dhama Dhama " | Ghibran | Yazin Nizar, Guru Hariraj | |
| 2024 | Miss You | "Nee enna paathiye" | Ghibran | Siddharth | |
| 2024 | Emakku Thozhil Romance | "Paakura Thaakura" | Nivas K. Prasanna | Kapil Kapilan, Nivas K. Prasanna | |
| 2024 | Emakku Thozhil Romance | "Un Goppamavale" | Nivas K. Prasanna | Nivas K. Prasanna, Reshma Shyam | |
| 2024 | Emakku Thozhil Romance | "Vaada Poda (Reprise)" | Nivas K. Prasanna | Shakthisree Gopalan | |
| 2024 | Emakku Thozhil Romance | "Nenjamelaam Kaadhal" | Nivas K. Prasanna | Varshini Muralikrishnan, Nivas K. Prasanna | |
| 2024 | Emakku Thozhil Romance | "Vaada Poda" | Nivas K. Prasanna | Vaishali, Nivas K. Prasanna | |
| 2025 | Vidaamuyarchi | "Thaniye" | Anirudh Ravichander | Anirudh Ravichander | |
| 2025 | Tourist Family | "Aachaley" | Sean Roldan | Sean Roldan | |
| 2025 | Tourist Family | "Vaazhndhu Paaru" | Sean Roldan | S. P. Charan | |
| 2025 | Tourist Family | "Iragey" | Sean Roldan | Vijay Yesudas | |
| 2025 | Tourist Family | "Iragey (Reprise)" | Sean Roldan | Venkatramanan | |
| 2025 | Tourist Family | "Mugai Mazhai" | Sean Roldan | Sean Roldan, Saindhavi | |
| 2025 | Tourist Family | "Maname" | Sean Roldan | Manoj Krishna, Sean Roldan | |
| 2025 | Tourist Family | "Ore Vaanam" | Sean Roldan | Yuvan Shankar Raja, Meha Agarwal | |
| 2025 | Love Marriage | "Bejaara Aanen" | Sean Roldan | Sivaangi Krishnakumar | |
| 2025 | Love Marriage | "Eduda Bottle" | Sean Roldan | Mysskin | |
| 2025 | Love Marriage | "Raasathorai" | Sean Roldan | Anthony Daasan, Meenakshi Elayaraja | |
| 2026 2026 | With Love Nooru Saami | "Aiyo Kadhaley" | Sean Roldan | Vijaynarain | |
| 2026 2026 | With Love Nooru Saami | "Morattu Muttal" | Sean Roldan | Sean Roldan | |
| 2026 2026 | With Love Nooru Saami | "Edhukku Dhan Indha Kaadhal" | Sean Roldan | Yuvan Shankar Raja | |
| 2026 2026 | With Love Nooru Saami | "Kaadhal Kadhai" Amma Amma Dhaan | Sean Roldan | Manoj Krishna, Sushmitha Narasimhan | |

=== Web Series ===
| Year | Series | Song | Composer | Singers |
|---|---|---|---|---|
| 2024 | Parachute | "Aagasa Usaram" | Yuvan Shankar Raja | Sriram Parthasarathy |
