= Shaitan (soundtrack) =

2011 soundtrack album

Shaitan (Original Motion Picture Soundtrack)

Soundtrack album by Prashant Pillai, Amar Mohile, Ranjit Barot, Anupam Roy, Bhayanak Maut, Mikey McCleary
- Released: 20 May 2011
- Recorded: 2008–2011
- Genre: Feature film soundtrack
- Length: 52:54
- Language: Hindi
- Label: T-Series

Shaitan (Original Motion Picture Soundtrack) is the soundtrack album to the 2011 film of the same name directed by Bejoy Nambiar. The soundtrack consisted of 14 tracks composed by Prashant Pillai, Amar Mohile, Ranjit Barot, Anupam Roy, Bhayanak Maut and Mikey McCleary with lyrics written by K. S. Krishnan, Sanjeev Sharma, Colin Terence, Abhishek and Shradha. The soundtrack was released through T-Series label on 20 May 2011.

== Development ==
Prashant Pillai was originally enlisted as the sole composer for Shaitan; his collaboration with Nambiar dated long back to 2004 when the latter emailed to him, expressing his interest to work with him, which Pillai refuted and four years later, in 2008, Nambiar again sent an email indicating his involvement on the short film Rahu. Eventually after an initial discussion, Nambiar recruited Pillai to work in Shaitan. Pillai, who was disinterested on being a film composer, expressed his gratitude to Nambiar on exploring the opportunity to do his own style and not to emulate other works, which being his key takeaway.

"It was a conscious effort to go off the beaten track with the OST and we didn't want to limit it to a particular genre of music. The credit goes to Bejoy and his crazy taste in music. He's amazing to work with but he is equally the devil of a taskmaster who has no qualms about bugging me – and the other composers [Ranjit Barot, Amar Mohile, Anupam Roy, Bhayanak Maut] – until he, and each of us, were thrilled with the product."

— Prashant Pillai on the music of Shaitan

While discussing about the music of Shaitan, Pillai wanted to reuse two songs composed by Yuvan Shankar Raja in Hindi, which would have been a collaborative effort within the two composers, that did not happen. Pillai, then suggested the idea of working with different artists and bands to curate the soundtrack, to break the conventional formula of exploring within a single genre and provide multiple genres. Eventually fellow composers Amar Mohile, Ranjit Barot, Anupam Roy, and the metal band Bhayanak Maut worked on the film's music. Barot composed three songs as well as the film score, while the other composers curated one track each, including the instrumentals. Pillai was the prominent contributor of the soundtrack, composing seven songs for the film. Mikey McCleary remixed the track "Hawa Hawai" from Mr. India (1987) composed by Laxmikant–Pyarelal and "Khoya Khoya Chand" from Kala Bazar (1960), scored by S. D. Burman. Though the latter was not featured in the film, it was released as a promotional track, post-release and also attached to the album The Bartender produced by Sony Music India.

== Release ==
The soundtrack album was launched on 20 May 2011 at the Hard Rock Cafe in Mumbai, with the attendance of prominent musicians performing at the event along with the cast and celebrities. T-Series purchased the music rights for the film and distributed the album into the market.

== Reception ==
The album opened to positive reviews from critics. A Hindustan Times-based reviewer gave 3 (out of 5) saying "the album is very different from a typical Bollywood album and that just might work in its favour". Ankit Ojha of Bollywood Hungama gave 4 stars (out of 5) and said "the album achieves that by instilling the music with nothing but the free spirit and passion of the composers who have all come together to create a wonderful fusion of urban and ethnic sounds". Vipin Nair of Music Aloud gave the album 7.25 out of 10 and said "a superlative effort from the bunch of composers with a leaning towards functional tracks which should work better on-screen". Karthik Srinivasan of Milliblog stated the soundtrack as "dizzying, eclectic, indulgent and occasionally overdone".

Kaveerie Bamzai of India Today wrote "The music is selected with care, new and old, remixed to rock riffs." A reviewer from The New Indian Express wrote "The music blends into the volatile theme. There is a quaint remix of the Dev Anand-Mohd Rafi-S.D. Burman classic ‘Khoya Khoya Chand’ as an ironical homage to the independence that the past generation fought for, and got." Blessy Chettiar of Daily News and Analysis wrote "With songs like ‘Bali — The Sound of Shaitan’ and ‘Nasha’, sound design is stylish and fresh at the same time. The tunes resonate in your head long after you have left the cinema hall." Sanjukta Sharma of Mint described the music as "hip and eclectic". Anupama Chopra, writing for NDTV stated "The film's sound-track, which lists five composers including Ranjit Barot and Amar Mohile and a metal band, is superb."

== Track listing ==
Shaitan (Original Motion Picture Soundtrack) track listing
No.	Title	Lyrics	Music	Singer(s)	Length
1.	"Amy's Theme"	Sanjeev Sharma	Ranjit Barot	Suzanne D'Mello	4:07
2.	"Fareeda"	Sanjeev Sharma	Prashant Pillai	Suraj Jagan	3:18
3.	"Josh"	Colin Terence, Abhishek, Shradha	Amar Mohile	Colin Terence, Abhishek, Shradha	4:05
4.	"Hawa Hawai"	Javed Akhtar	Laxmikant–Pyarelal, Mikey McCleary	Suman Sridhar	4:54
5.	"Nasha"	Sanjeev Sharma	Prashant Pillai	Prashant Pillai, Bindu Nambiar	3:15
6.	"O Yaara"	Sanjeev Sharma	Prashant Pillai	Kirti Sagatia, Preeti Pillai	5:07
7.	"Pintya"	Sanjeev Sharma	Ranjit Barot	Dr. Ganesh Chandanshive	2:58
8.	"Zindagi"	Sanjeev Sharma	Ranjit Barot	Ranjit Barot	3:11
9.	"Bali" (The Sound of Shaitan)	K. S. Krishnan	Prashant Pillai	Farhad Bhiwandiwala, K.S. Krishnan, Preeti Pillai, Hitesh Modak, Kalloist	3:36
10.	"Enter"	—	Prashant Pillai	Instrumental	1:20
11.	"Nasha" (Rock & Soul Version)	Sanjeev Sharma	Prashant Pillai	Ranjit Barot, Farhad Bhiwandiwala, Bindu Nambiar	4:17
12.	"Outro"	—	Prashant Pillai	Instrumental	1:36
13.	"Retro Pop Shit"	—	Anupam Roy	Instrumental	3:17
14.	"Unleashed"	—	Bhayanak Maut	Instrumental	3:39
15.	"Khoya Khoya Chand"	Shailendra	S. D. Burman, Mikey McCleary	Suman Sridhar	4:10
Total length:					52:54

== Awards and nominations ==
Accolades for Shaitan (Original Motion Picture Soundtrack)
Award	Date of ceremony (Note: Date is linked to the article about the awards held that year, wherever possible.)	Category	Recipients	Result	Ref.
Screen Awards	14 January 2012	Best Background Music	Ranjit Barot	Won	
Screen Awards	14 January 2012	Best Female Playback	Suman Sridhar	Nominated	
Zee Cine Awards	21 January 2012	Best Background Music	Ranjit Barot	Won	
Filmfare Awards	29 January 2012	Best Background Score	Ranjit Barot	Won	
