= David (2013 Tamil film) =

2013 Indian film by Bejoy Nambiar

- Theatrical release poster
- Directed by: Bejoy Nambiar
- Written by: Dialogues: Bejoy Nambiar; G. Mani Gandan
- Screenplay by: Bejoy Nambiar; Natasha Sahgal
- Story by: Bejoy Nambiar
- Produced by: Bejoy Nambiar; Sharada Trilok; Vikram
- Starring: Vikram; Jiiva; Tabu; Lara Dutta; Isha Sharvani
- Cinematography: R. Rathnavelu; P. S. Vinod
- Edited by: A. Sreekar Prasad
- Music by: Remo Fernandes; Maatibani; Anirudh Ravichander; Bramfatura; Prashant Pillai; Modern Mafia; Dub Sharma
- Production company: Getaway Films
- Distributed by: Reliance Entertainment
- Release date: 1 February 2013
- Running time: 118 minutes
- Country: India
- Language: Tamil

David is a 2013 Indian Tamil-language crime drama film directed by Bejoy Nambiar, starring Vikram and Jiiva in the title roles, alongside Tabu, Lara Dutta, Isha Sharvani and Nassar. The plot revolves around the lives of two different men named David, who are about to take a step which is going to change their lives forever.

The film was simultaneously made in Hindi in the same title with slight variations in the cast and story. David was released worldwide on 1 February 2013.

== Plot ==
The story is about two Davids living in different parts of India whose lives eventually come together in a twist of events.

In 1999, 19-year-old David is an amateur guitarist born into a family of lower-middle class Christians in a poor colony in Mumbai. He is a happy go lucky teenager who dreams of becoming a professional musician and sending his sister, Sussannah off to Dubai to pursue her dreams. Their father, Noel, a Protestant priest rallies the locals to do charity work for those in need. A Hindu fanatic politician, Malathi Tai, finds out about this and makes it appear as if David's father is converting poor people to Christianity in return for money. She attacks David's colony with the help of gangsters and humiliates Noel by blackening his face in front of the media. Traumatized by this, the priest starts to lose his mind. An angry David is then easily persuaded by a political activist to assassinate Malathi at a rally to seek vengeance. However, when David tries to kill Malathi by a knife, the political activist shouts by David's name and shoots Malathi by a Pistol, and bullet attacks her.

In 2010, 30-year-old David is an alcoholic fisherman living in the small fishing village of Betul in Goa. He falls in love with the deaf and mute Roma – the only hitch is that she is engaged to be married to his best friend Peter in 10 days. When he finds out Peter does not really love her but is only marrying her for her wealthy father's boat which he will receive as dowry, David is coaxed by his friend, Frenny to stop the wedding. However, David comes to realise that his intentions might not be sincere as both his mother and the priest who tries to help him stop the wedding become involved in separate accidents and are hospitalized. On the day of the wedding, David plans to profess his love for Roma until Peter reveals that he actually sincerely loves her and was only lying that he was marrying her for the dowry out of fear he would be teased. David decides not to stop the wedding.

Gradually, it is revealed that both Davids are connected somehow in the turn of events. Witnessing the Malathi's attempted assassination makes the Mumbai David realise what he almost became had he been the one to do the assassination. He then moves to Goa and becomes a priest like his father. In 2010, he is the priest that marries off Peter to Roma. Realising that the Goan David would have spoken out against the wedding, he praises the Goan David for not doing so after the ceremony.

== Cast ==
- Vikram as the fisherman David/Kirku Santa
- Jiiva as the guitarist David
- Tabu as Frenny, a friend of the fisherman David
- Lara Dutta as Gayathri, a woman to whom and to his son the guitarist David goes to teach guitar
- Krish Parekh as Gayathri's son
- Isha Sharvani as Roma
- Saurabh Shukla as the fisherman David's father
- Rubi Chakravarti as Maria, the fisherman's David's mother
- Nishan Nanaiah as Peter
- Prahlad Kakkar as Father Albert
- Nassar as Noel, the guitarist David's father
- Sheetal Menon as Sussannah
- Shweta Pandit as Alice
- Rohini Hattangadi as Malathi Tai
- John Vijay as Ranade Babu
- Satish Kaushik as a neighbour of guitarist David
- Sunder Ramu as the man who stabs the politician
- Remo Fernandes in a special appearance

== Production ==
=== Development ===
In December 2011, Bejoy Nambiar was announced to be making a Hindi gangster film titled David, with Vikram as the lead actor. The pair had previously worked together in Mani Ratnam's Raavan and Raavanan, in which Nambiar had been an assistant director. Sanjeev Lamba of Reliance, the film's producer, then noted that the film had undergone changes and would be made a bilingual in Tamil and Hindi. Vikram was not informed that the film was being made in Tamil. In April 2012, Jiiva was confirmed to appear. He would be playing a rock star who hails from Bandra, Mumbai.

The Tamil version would simultaneously show tracks of two people named David with Vikram's story taking place in Goa, while Jiiva's portion happens in Mumbai. A third story, featuring Neil Nitin Mukesh that was shot for the Hindi version, was planned to be retained for the Tamil version as well. It was eventually scrapped due to language localisation issues; Neil felt some of the Hindi dialogues would lose their "impact" if dubbed in Tamil.

=== Filming ===
Singer Shweta Pandit shot for the film in both languages making her debut as an actress. Actor-director Satish Kaushik, who had wanted to work under Nambiar's direction after being impressed with Shaitan, was signed on portray one of the rock star David's neighbours in both versions. Only scenes from Jiiva's segment were reshot for the Tamil version while Vikram's scenes were reused from the Hindi version.

== Marketing ==
Bejoy Nambiar planned an innovative strategy to release the first look of the film on sites such as Twitter and YouTube.

== Soundtrack ==
David

Soundtrack album by Various Artists
- Released: 21 December 2012
- Genre: Feature film soundtrack
- Length: 34:19
- Labels: T-Series; Reliance Big Music
- Producers: Bejoy Nambiar; Prashant Pillai

Singles from David
- 1. "Kanave Kanave" Released: 7 December 2012

David's ensemble soundtrack comprises nine tracks by various artists which consists of Bramfatura, Anirudh Ravichander, Maatibaani and Modern Mafia composing each one song, while Prashant Pillai and Remo Fernandes contributing two tracks each, and a remix version by Dub Sharma.The track "Kanave Kanave" was released as the first single on 7 December 2012. The full album was released on 21 December 2012, at a launch event held at the renovated Rani Seethai Hall, in attendance of the film cast and crew. The film's audio CD was launched at the event.

Track listing
No.	Title	Lyrics	Music	Singer(s)	Length
1.	"Vaazhkaye" (The Theme of David)	Mohan Rajan	Bramfatura	Siddharth Basrur	3:59
2.	"Maria Pitache"	V. Elango, Remo Fernandes	Remo Fernandes	Vikram, Remo Fernandes	3:46
3.	"Kanave Kanave"	Mohan Rajan	Anirudh Ravichander	Anirudh Ravichander	4:44
4.	"Mannamey"	Mohan Rajan	Prashant Pillai, Tao Issaro	Karthik	3:14
5.	"Iruvanil Ullavavaa"	Yugabharathi	Prashant Pillai	Naresh Iyer, Shweta Pandit	3:32
6.	"Theerathu Poga Poga Vaanam"	Mohan Rajan, Joyshanti	Maatibaani	Nirali Kartik, Joyshanti	4:05
7.	"Machi"	Mohan Rajan	Modern Mafia	Sanjeev Thomas	2:41
8.	"Light House Symphony"	Mohan Rajan, Remo Fernandes	Remo Fernandes	Instrumental	4:33
9.	"Mannamey" (Dub Step Version)	Remo Fernandes	Prashant Pillai, Remixed by Dub Sharma	Karthik	3:32

Musicperk.com rated the album 8/10 quoting "A trendsetting killer soundtrack!" Haricharan Pudipeddi from Nowrunning.com gave 3.5 out of 5 and said "One thing common between any A. R. Rahman's soundtrack and this album is that it takes time for the listener to understand and appreciate the music. It's very unlikely that one may like it instantly". IBNLive said that "the soundtrack boasts of trendsetting music" Indo-Asian News Service rated the soundtrack 3 out of 5, with the song "Kanave Kanave" as their pick of the album. MusicAloud rated the album 8/10, stating "There is no doubting Bejoy Nambiar's exquisite sense of music. To do that with as many as nine different composers is quite a feat! Respect." Karthik Srinivasan reviewed the soundtrack as "David soundtrack is mighty unconventional for a Tamil film. But where it loses out lyrically, it makes up in audacity and sheer diversity, delivering a vibrant pastiche!"

== Reception ==
Kirthi Jeyakumar of Rediff.com gave David 4 out of 5 stars, and stated "The characters themselves are realistic, and believable. Their emotional struggles and their reactions to the world around them are pictures painted with vibrant shades, rather than the disturbed and dark protagonist that one is wont to consider them to be. Thinking out of the box can sure get one ahead, and Nambiar has proved his prowess with elan." Subha J Rao of The Hindu stated "Watch if you love a film that is not packed with action. This one flows by languidly, chronicling inner journeys." A critic from The Times of India rated the film two out of five stars and wrote that "The movie might be about love, making crucial decisions and the situations that bring people together, but ‘David’ doesn't conjure up enough magic to inspire us!" A critic from The New Indian Express wrote that "A film that strives to move away from the beaten track, it could have been crafted better". A critic from Emirates 24/7 criticized the film, but added "Despite its many downfalls and a rather unbefitting end, ‘David’ is a brave movie that must be endorsed."
