= David (2013 Hindi film) =

2013 film by Bejoy Nambiar

- Theatrical release poster
- Directed by: Bejoy Nambiar
- Written by: Dialogues: Abhijeet Deshpande; Tariq Naved Siddiqui
- Screenplay by: Bejoy Nambiar; Natasha Sahgal
- Story by: Bejoy Nambiar
- Produced by: Bejoy Nambiar; Sharada Trilok
- Starring: Neil Nitin Mukesh; Vikram; Vinay Virmani; Tabu; Monica Dogra; Lara Dutta; Isha Sharvani
- Cinematography: R. Rathnavelu; P. S. Vinod; Sanu Varghese
- Edited by: A. Sreekar Prasad
- Music by: Mikey McCleary; Remo Fernandes; Anirudh Ravichander; Prashant Pillai; Modern Mafia; Bramfatura; Dub Sharma
- Production company: Getaway Films
- Distributed by: Reliance Entertainment
- Release date: 1 February 2013
- Running time: 160 minutes
- Country: India
- Language: Hindi
- Box office: ₹17 crore

David is a 2013 Indian Hindi-language crime drama film directed by Bejoy Nambiar, starring Neil Nitin Mukesh, Vikram, and Vinay Virmani in the titlular role, alongside Tabu, Monica Dogra, Lara Dutta and Isha Sharvani. An altered version with the same title David featuring a slightly different cast was simultaneously shot in Tamil. The plot revolves around the lives of three different men named David, who are about to take a step which is going to change their lives forever. Both the Hindi and Tamil versions were released on 1 February 2013.

== Plot ==
The story revolves around the lives of three Davids in three different parts of the world in three different eras.

London, 1975: 30-year-old David works for Iqbal Ghani, a dreaded Mafia don who controls London's Muslim community through his illegal activities. David is Ghani's protege who is poised to take over the empire one day as Ghani's son is a spoilt brat. David is in love with Ghani's ward, Noor and promises to marry her. Things take a turn when two undercover RAW agents come to London to expose Ghani's ties to religious extremists in India. While trying to take David down, the agents reveal to him that his mother was Ghani's mistress and Ghani might have killed his father to be with her. David's loyalty towards his master is tested even more when Noor is forcefully married off to Ghani's son to hide the fact that he is gay even though she is pregnant with David's son. When the RAW agents finally manage to get close to Ghani, they assassinate not only him but David as well to keep their mission a secret from the British authorities.

Mumbai, 1999: 19-year-old David is an amateur guitarist born into a family of lower-middle class Christians. He is a happy-go-lucky teenager who dreams of becoming a professional musician and sending his sisters off to Dubai to pursue their dreams. Their father, Noel, a Protestant priest rallies the locals to do charity work for those in need. A Hindu fanatic politician, Malati Tai, finds out about this and makes it appear as if David's father is converting poor people to Christianity in return for money. She attacks David's colony with the help of gangsters and humiliates Noel by blackening his face in front of the media. Traumatised by this, the priest starts to lose his mind. An angry David is then easily persuaded by a political activist to assassinate Malati at a rally to seek vengeance. However, the plan is foiled when an unknown gunman fails to assassinate Malati and instead kills the police officer standing next to her.

Goa, 2010: 30-year-old David is an alcoholic fisherman living in the small fishing village of Betul in Goa. He falls in love with the deaf and mute Roma – the only hitch is that she is engaged to be married to his best friend Peter in 10 days. When he finds out Peter does not really love her but is only marrying her for her wealthy father's boat which he will receive as dowry, David is coaxed by his friend, Frenny to stop the wedding. However, David comes to realise that his intentions might not be sincere as both his mother and the priest who tries to help him stop the wedding become involved in separate accidents and are hospitalised. On the day of the wedding, David plans to profess his love for Roma until Peter reveals that he actually sincerely loves her and was only lying that he was marrying her for the dowry out of fear he would be teased. David decides not to stop the wedding.

Gradually, it is revealed that all three Davids are connected somehow in the turn of events. In 1999, the London David's son with Noor, Iqbal, comes to Mumbai to seek revenge for his father's murder from the two RAW agents. He kills one RAW agent who is retiring as a General. The police officer killed at Malati Tai's rally is actually the other RAW agent who Iqbal shoots down with intent. Witnessing the shooting makes the Mumbai David realise what he almost became had he succeeded in assassinating Malati. He then moves to Goa and becomes a priest.

In 2010, he is the priest that marries off Peter to Roma. Realising that the Goa David would have spoken out against the wedding, he praises the Goa David for not doing so after the ceremony.

== Cast ==
- Neil Nitin Mukesh as David, the Gangster and Iqbal
- Vikram as David, the fisherman / Sakku Santa
- Vinay Virmani as David, the guitarist
- Tabu as Frenny
- Monica Dogra as Noor
- Lara Dutta as Neelam
- Isha Sharvani as Roma
- Sheetal Menon as Sussannah
- Nassar as Father Noel
- Nishan as Peter
- Prahlad Kakkar as Father Albert
- Remo Fernandes (Special appearance in song Maria Pitache)
- Calvin Manish as Musician
- Rubi Chakravarti as the fisherman David's mother
- Rohini Hattangadi as Malati Tai
- Milind Soman as Gangster
- John Vijay as Ranade Bhai
- Saurabh Shukla as Fisherman David's father
- Shweta Pandit as Alice
- Satish Kaushik as guitarist David's neighbour Sharma
- Anupama Kumar as Zainab
- Akarsh Khurana as Ghani
- Vinod Sherawat as RAW agent
- Manish Jha as Vijay
- Bharat Jha as Bharat
- Ajinkya Deo as RAW agent
- Nikhil Chinapa as Boxer
- Sarika (Special appearance)
- Neil Bhoopalam as Jahanzeb

== Production ==
=== Development ===
Bejoy Nambiar announced in December 2011 that he would make a Hindi film titled David, a gangster-comedy, and signed on Vikram to play a protagonist in the film. The pair had previously worked together in Mani Ratnam's Raavan and Raavanan, in which Nambiar had been an assistant director. It was revealed that the film would simultaneously show tracks of three people named David: Vikram's story takes place in Goa, while the two other stories happen in Mumbai and London and that they occur at different periods. Three cinematographer, R. Rathnavelu, P. S. Vinod and Sanu Varghese were recruited to shoot the respective segments. Sanjeev Lamba of Reliance, the film's producer, noted that the film had undergone changes and would be made a bilingual in Hindi and Tamil.

Vivek Oberoi was also recruited to play a titular character in the film. However, Oberoi opted out of the project after finding out that the film would be a bilingual, and the team considered Farhan Akhtar before replacing him with Neil Nitin Mukesh. Neil Nitin Mukesh was asked to sport a complete retro-gangster look, and grow a hefty moustache for his role in the film. Neil's portions in the film would be shot in London. Canadian-Indian actor Vinay Virmani would play the third character called David in the film. In January 2012, the producers signed Tabu and Isha Sharvani to play lead female roles in the film, with reports that Isha would be paired opposite Vikram.

=== Filming ===
Scenes involving Vikram were filmed first out of the three segments and were canned in locations which were meant to show a Goan backdrop. The team thus shot scenes featuring Vikram and Isha Sharvani in Alleppey, Kerala in late February 2012, before moving to Kuttanad. Mangalore beach was designed to replicate the beaches of Goa and a song featuring Remo Fernandes was also shot in February. Ratnavelu revealed that scenes were also canned in Kapu, Karnataka disguising Goa and that Vikram finished his portions for the film by March 2012. Nishan, a Mumbai-based actor who had appeared in Malayalam language films, was also selected to play a role in the segment, while actress Rubi Chakravarti was also recruited to play Vikram's mother in the film after Bejoy Nambiar approached for a role written with her in mind. Prahlad Kakkar, a noted ad-maker, was convinced by Nambiar to make his debut in film by appearing in the role of a priest and consequently shot his scenes in Mangalore.

The scenes of the character playing a musician Vinay Virmani, was the second segment to be shot with Sejal Shah recruited as cinematographer. Lara Dutta plays an extended cameo role in both versions as a mother, whose child is taught music by Virmani character. Sheetal Menon, who appeared in Shaitan was also recruited to play a pivotal role in Vinay Virmani's sequences. Singer Shweta Pandit also shot for the film in both languages making her debut as a musician, while Nassar was recruited to appear in both versions of the film. Actor-director Satish Kaushik also shot for this portion of the film, portraying one of David's neighbours.

Nambiar noted that Neil Nitin Mukesh's scenes were the most problematic to shoot as a result of the actor's involvement in his other film 3G being shot in Fiji and thus dates were difficult to accommodate Shilpi Shukla did great in the movie to. Akarsh Khurana, a theatre actor, who also helped write portions in the film, was also selected to play a major role and shot for scenes in Neil's portion. Monica Dogra was chosen to portray the female lead in this segment, being paired opposite Neil Nitin Mukesh. Anupama Kumar, who was previously seen in Ishqiya, was one of the few South actors to be recruited to act in the Hindi version; she would play a Pakistani woman of the 1970s which she termed as "very different and exciting". The scenes involving Neil's character would start in Canada and finish in Ooty and completed by the end of 2012. A five-day shooting was held at the City Hall of Belfast, Northern Ireland, UK in September 2012.

=== Marketing ===
Bejoy Nambiar planned an innovative strategy to release the first look of the film on sites such as Twitter and YouTube. The trailer of both versions were received very positively all over.

== Music ==
David

Soundtrack album by Various Artists
- Released: 31 December 2012
- Genre: Feature film soundtrack
- Length: 58:34
- Label: T-Series
- Producers: Bejoy Nambiar; Prashant Pillai

Singles from David
- 1. "Yun Hi Re" Released: 10 December 2012; 2. "Dama Dam Mast Qalandar" Released: 17 December 2012

The soundtrack of David consists of 15 tracks composed by eight various artists, including Prashant Pillai and Mikey McCleary, who had worked on Nambiar's Shaitan, too, and independent bands Bramfatura, Maatibaani and Modern Mafia. Tamil film composer Anirudh Ravichander of "Why This Kolaveri Di" fame, also contributed one song, making his Bollywood debut. The song "Yun Hi Re", which is the Hindi version of "Kanave Kanave" which is composed by Anirudh Ravichander was released as a single on 10 December 2012. A new version of the famous traditional Qawwali number "Dama Dam Mast Qalandar" was released on 17 December 2012.

The album was released on 31 December 2012, and received positive reviews from critics. The Times of India, gave a 4.5/5 rating and then stated that "David's soundtrack has got everything to keep the listener hooked for a long time. The film is set in three different time periods, so the music explores three different eras and is very refreshing. Hard to sum up the verdict on David, it is truly blockbuster material." Music Aloud, reviewing for both Tamil and Hindi versions, gave a rating of 8/10, and stated "The Hindi score may not impress as much as Tamil, but there is no doubting Bejoy Nambiar’s exquisite sense of music. To do that with as many as nine different composers is quite a feat! Respect."

No.	Title	Lyrics	Music	Singer(s)	Length
1.	"Ghum Huye" (The Theme of David)	Ankur Tewari	Bramfatura	Siddharth Basrur	3:59
2.	"Mast Kalandar"	Bulleh Shah	Mikey McCleary	Rekha Bhardwaj	4:19
3.	"Tore Matware Naina"	Maatibaani, Joyshanti	Maatibaani	Nirali Karthik, Joyshanti	4:05
4.	"Maria Pitache"	Remo Fernandes, Abhijeet Deshpande	Remo Fernandes	Remo Fernandes	3:46
5.	"Tere Mere Pyaar Ki"	Gopal Dutt	Prashant Pillai	Naresh Iyer, Shweta Pandit	3:33
6.	"Bandhay"	Ankur Tewari	Modern Mafia	Modern Mafia	2:41
7.	"Yun Hi Re"	Turaz	Anirudh Ravichander	Anirudh Ravichander, Shweta Mohan	4:44
8.	"Rab Di"	Prashant Pillai	Prashant Pillai, Tao Issaro	Karthik	3:14
9.	"Out of Control"	Mikey McCleary, Preeti Pillai	Mikey McCleary	Nikhil D'Souza, Preeti Pillai	4:17
10.	"Ya Husain"	Lucky Ali	Mikey McCleary	Lucky Ali	2:32
11.	"Mast Kalandar" (Vengeance Mix)	Mikey McCleary	Mikey McCleary, Gaurav Godkhindi	Rekha Bhardwaj	4:13
12.	"Out of Control" (Choir Version)		Mikey McCleary	Instrumental	4:37
13.	"Three Kills"	The Lightyears Explode	The Lightyears Explode	Saurabh Roy	4:15
14.	"Light House Symphony"		Remo Fernandes	Instrumental	4:33
15.	"Rab Di" (Dub Step Version)	Prashant Pillai	Prashant Pillai, Remixed by Dub Sharma	Karthik	3:31

== Reception ==
=== Critical reception ===
Sukanya Verma for Rediff.com has given 2.5 out of 5 stars for the movie and says "A shorter, snappier David with a little less rambling and randomness may have led to a better payoff. Still, there’s no denying Nambiar’s promise as an adventurous, aesthetically-sound filmmaker but his weak spot remains the same. His eye for dynamic visuals is yet to find its match in stories that speak." Shivesh Kumar of IndiaWeekly awarded the movie 2 out of 5 stars. NDTV gave 3 out of 5 stars, stating "With a run time of 155 minutes, David tends to be a tad flabby at times. In other words, its pace is anything but consistent." The Times of India, gave 3 out of 5 stars and described the movie as "Yes, the Devil's in the detail. But maybe David needed more 'D' of 'Depth' in the story to make this more 'Delightful'."

=== Box office ===
The film opened to very positive response of 50% only and collected ₹50–60 lakh net on its first day. The second showed a little growth of around 50% bringing up the 2-day total to ₹1.6 crore. On day 3, it collected another ₹1.05 crore and the total collection for the 1st weekend would be ₹2.57 crore net at the domestic box office. David had an average fourth day and collected ₹2.1 crore.

== See also ==
- David (2013 Tamil film)
