= Unda (soundtrack) =

Soundtrack album by Prashant Pillai
- Released: 24 May 2019
- Studio: My Studio, Kochi
- Genre: Feature film soundtrack
- Length: 11:36
- Language: Hindi; Malayalam
- Label: Goodwill Entertainments
- Producer: Prashant Pillai

Prashant Pillai chronology
Padayottam (2018)	Unda (2019)	Jallikkattu (2019)
External audio
- Audio Jukebox on YouTube

Unda is the soundtrack album to the 2019 film of the same name directed by Khalid Rahman and starring Mammootty, Shine Tom Chacko, Jacob Gregory and Arjun Ashokan. The soundtrack featured three songs composed by Prashant Pillai with lyrics written by Kirendra Yadav and Hussain Haidry. The album was released under the Goodwill Entertainments label on 24 May 2019.

== Background ==
Prashant Pillai composed the music and background score for Unda. Rahman wanted the film's score to resemble the indigenous music for Bastar. A year before filming, Rahman along with Pillai and his team visited the region's villages, they recorded various sounds, music and instruments from those locations. The locals who sang in the film included children, youngsters, old men and women while further playing their traditional instruments. The film featured three songs, mostly consisted of Hindi and Malayalam lyrics. The songs were written by Kirendra Yadav and Hussain Haidry.

== Track listing ==
No.	Title	Lyrics	Singer(s)	Length
1.	"Bastar Awaits"	Kirendra Yadav	various folk singers from Bastar	02:28
2.	"Badar Garaj – A Beautiful Bastar"	Kirendra Yadav	Kirendra Yadav	03:46
3.	"Kaara Kaara – The Journey Continues"	Hussain Haidry	Prashant Pillai	05:22
Total length:				11:36

== Reception ==
Navamy Sudhish of The Hindu noted that "Prashant Pillai’s scoundscape adds a solid edge to the inherent drama". Baradwaj Rangan of Film Companion South noted "Prashant Pillai's score does generally do more work than it needs to". Cris of The News Minute wrote "Prashant Pillai’s background music makes certain scenes a lot more powerful (a scene when Mammootty falls and all the others circle his attacker with their bullet-less guns is truly chilling)." Neelima Menon of HuffPost called it as a "terrific background score by Prashant Pillai". Anna M. M. Vetticad of Firstpost noted the music being "beautifully understated, localised", and Sarath Ramesh Kuniyl of The Week called it as "lilting".

== Accolades ==
Awards	Category	Recipient	Result	Ref.
CPC Cine Awards	Best Background Score	Prashant Pillai	Nominated	
