= Sheetal Menon =

Indian model and actress

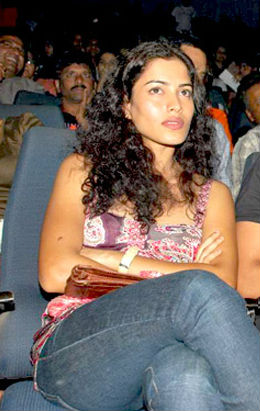
- Menon in 2010
- Occupations: Model, actress
- Years active: 2008–present
- Spouse: Bejoy Nambiar (m. 2015)

Sheetal Menon is an Indian model and former actress, who works predominantly in Hindi films and television.

== Career ==
During her final year in college, she joined Anupam Kher's course, Actor Prepares. Her first acting role came in Nari Hira's Bhram – An Illusion directed by Pawan Kaul. Her films include Shaitan (2011), directed by Bejoy Nambiar, Julayi (Telugu) (2012) and David (2013).

She acted in an ad with Shah Rukh Khan in 2025.

== Personal life ==
Her origin is Kerala and Mangaluru. She married Bejoy Nambiar in 2015.

== Filmography ==
Year	Film	Role	Language	Notes
2008	Bhram – An Illusion	Antara Tyagi	Hindi	Debut
2010	My Name Is Khan	Radha	Hindi	
2010	The Desire		English; Hindi; Cantonese	Indo-Chinese film
2011	Shaitan	Nandini	Hindi	
2012	Julayi	Devayani	Telugu	
2013	David	Sussannah	Hindi	Bilingual film
2013	David	Sussannah	Tamil	Bilingual film

== Web series ==
Year	Show	Role	Notes
2019	Flip	Reza	
