= Flip (TV series) =

- Promotional poster
- Genre: Thriller
- Created by: Bejoy Nambiar
- Written by: Bejoy Nambiar; Radhika Malhotra; Aparna Nadig
- Directed by: Bejoy Nambiar; Aman Sachdeva
- Starring: Ranvir Shorey; Shruti Marathe; Arjun Mathur; Shweta Basu Prasad; Shweta Gulati; Pallavi Batra; Sarang Sathaye; Jim Sarbh; Viraf Patel; Sandeepa Dhar; Sheetal Menon; Naman Shaw
- Composers: Gaurav Godkhindi; Govind Vasantha; Ashu; Varun Sunil
- Country of origin: India
- Original language: Hindi
- No. of seasons: 1
- No. of episodes: 4

Production
- Editors: Ashish Suryavanshi; Farooq Hundekar; Priyank Prem Kumar
- Camera setup: Jay Oza; Viraj Singh; Srijit Basu; Yamini Yagnamurthy

Original release
- Network: Eros Now
- Release: 23 March 2019

Flip is a 2019 Indian Hindi-language anthology thriller miniseries directed by Bejoy Nambiar and Aman Sachdeva starring an ensemble cast featuring Ranvir Shorey and Jim Sarbh. The series was released to negative reviews.

== Cast ==
=== The Hunt ===
- Sheetal Menon as Reza
- Naman Shaw as Parth
- Rii Sen as Rosh
- Aditi Vasudev as Esta
- Isha Asmin as Sita
- Harry Alag as Harry

=== Bully ===
- Ranvir Shorey as Raghu
- Kartik Krishnan
- Shruti Marathe as Radhika

=== Massage ===
- Jim Sarbh as Keke
- Sandeepa Dhar as Firdaus
- Viraf Patel as Navzar

=== Happy Birthday ===
- Arjun Mathur as Shiv
- Shweta Gulati as Anvita
- Pallavi Batra as Shweta

== Episodes ==
No. in season	Title	Directed by	Original release date
1	"The Hunt"	Bejoy Nambiar	23 March 2019
2	"Bully"	Bejoy Nambiar	23 March 2019
3	"Massage"	Bejoy Nambiar	23 March 2019
4	"Happy Birthday"	Aman Sachdeva	23 March 2019

== Reception ==
A critic from Scroll.in wrote, "There’s a strong cast, some interesting narrative techniques and engaging stories, but nothing stands out. The promised twists for each storyline aren’t as shocking as the creators would have you believe".
