= Ittefaq (2001 film) =

2001 film by Sanjay Khanna

- Directed by: Sanjay Khanna
- Screenplay by: Imtiaz Patel; Yunus Sajawal
- Produced by: Raj Lalchandani; Asoo Nihalani
- Starring: Sunil Shetty; Pooja Batra; Mukul Dev; Kader Khan; Remo Fernandes; Shakti Kapoor
- Cinematography: Damodar Naidu
- Edited by: Yusuf Khan
- Music by: Dilip Sen-Sameer Sen
- Release date: 14 September 2001
- Running time: 145 mins
- Country: India
- Language: Hindi

Ittefaq (English: Coincidence) is a 2001 Indian Hindi-language masala film directed by Sanjay Khanna. It stars Sunil Shetty, Pooja Batra and Mukul Dev in pivotal roles. Pop musician Remo Fernandes also makes a special appearance in the film. The film was a box office failure.

== Plot ==
Efficient ex cop-turned hit man Shiva takes on a contract to find Vikram, an eyewitness to a murder committed by crime boss Jindal and bring him back to Mumbai. But he soon finds himself protecting Vikram and his girlfriend instead, and fighting the people who sent him in the first place.

== Cast ==
- Sunil Shetty - Shiv Kumar 'Shiva'
- Mukul Dev - Vikram Singh
- Pooja Batra - Roshni G. Hiranandani
- Anupama Verma - Anu
- Tiku Talsania - ACP Narayan Gaitonde
- Shakti Kapoor - ACP Pratap Rathod
- Puneet Issar - Inspector Paras Thakur
- Mushtaq Khan - Batak Lal
- Shiva Rindani - Banta
- Shehzad Khan - Santa
- Ishrat Ali - Manek Rao
- Ashok Saraf - Shambhu Shikari
- Arun Bakshi - ACP Anand Verma
- Mohan Joshi - S.K. Jindal
- Kader Khan - Gujjumal Hiranandani
- Razzak Khan - Pandit Godbole
- Dinesh Hingoo - Gangaram
- Anjana Mumtaz - Shanti, Vikram's Mother
- Raju Shrestha - Nilesh Panjwani
- Rakesh Bedi - Constable Pandit Kaushik Singh
- Pappu Polyester
- Nawab Shah - Bakhtawar

== Soundtrack ==
Ittefaq

Soundtrack album by Dilip Sen-Sameer Sen
- Released: April 2001
- Recorded: Aijaz Ahmed
- Venue: Mumbai
- Studio: Saba Studio
- Genre: Feature film soundtrack
- Length: 26min 28sec
- Language: Hindi
- Label: Zee Records
- Producer: Asoo Nihalani, Raj Lalchandani

The music of the film was composed by Dilip Sen-Sameer Sen, and the lyrics were written by Sameer. The soundtrack was released in April 2001 on Audio Cassette and CDs by Zee Music, which consists of 6 songs. The full album was sung by some playback singers like Abhijeet, Alka Yagnik, Babul Supriyo, Hema Sardesai, Sunidhi Chauhan Jaspinder Narula and Remo Fernandes.

Track list
| No. | Title | Singer(s) | Length |
|---|---|---|---|
| 1. | "Raaton Ko" | Abhijeet, Poornima |
| 2. | "Main Aashiq Hoon" | Babul Supriyo, Sunidhi Chauhan |
| 3. | "Bom Mat Mar" | Remo Fernandes |
| 4. | "Mohabbat Ho Gayi Hai" | Babul Supriyo, Alka Yagnik |
| 5. | "Tanana Dhir Tanana" | Abhijeet, Hema Sardesai |
| 6. | "Dil Dil Dil" | Jaspinder Narula |

Notes

- Track 5 "Tanana Dhir Tanana" was not used in the film.

== Reception ==
Taran Adarsh of IndiaFM gave the film one out of five, writing, "Editing is loose. Dialogues are commonplace. Cinematography is average. On the whole, ITTEFAQ is too ordinary a fare and has some chances at small stations only. Ashish Magotra of Rediff.com wrote, "What is this film? An action-thriller, a comedy, a love-story, a drama? Whatever it is, it fails on all counts."
