= Shweta Pandit =

Indian singer and actress

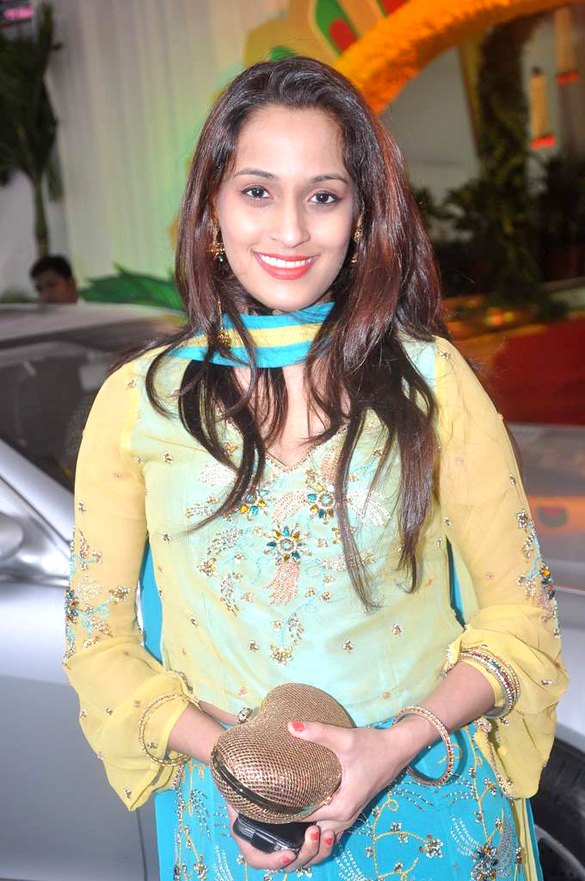
- Shweta Pandit in 2012

Background information
- Born: Shweta Pandit; 7 July 1986 (age 40); Mumbai, Maharashtra, India
- Genres: Indian classical, Pop, Bollywood playback
- Occupations: Singer, actress
- Years active: 1995–present
- Spouse: Ivano Fucci (m. 2016)

Shweta Pandit (born 7 July 1986) is an Indian singer and actress who primarily works in Hindi cinema. She has also recorded songs for films in Telugu and Tamil and many other Indian languages.

== Music career ==
At the age of four, Pandit worked with Indian composer Ilayaraja for the Tamil film Anjali, which was re-recorded in Hindi. She re-dubbed for the lead child in the film and also sang the songs in Hindi.

She had her breakthrough with Yash Raj Films and Aditya Chopra's Mohabbatein (2000) with five songs at the age of fourteen. She was chosen to sing in the film after she auditioned for the final selection amongst several singers. Her notable hits include "Ishq Khudai" from Rudraksh (2003), "Halla Re" from Neal 'n' Nikki (2005), "Chorre ki baatein" from Fight Club (2006), "You're my love" from Partner (2007), "Tera Sarapa" from Welcome (2007), "Bandhane Lagi" from Naach (2005), "Jhini Jhini" from Sarkar Raj (2008), "Raghupati Raghav" from Satyagraha (2011), "Chadha de Rang" from Yamla Pagla Deewana (2011), Thug le" from Ladies vs Ricky Bahl (2011), "Madhubala" from Mere Brother Ki Dulhan (2011), "Tere Hoke Rahenge" from Raja Natwarlal (2014), and "Heera" from Highway (2014).

Her debut record album Main Zindagi Hoon (2002) released when she was only sixteen years old with EMI Virgin Records, India, making her the youngest Indian Pop star. She released three videos from this album. Her other pop albums include Aplam Chaplam (2005) featuring Bollywood superstar Salman Khan. Strumm Sound Digital released two unwind remix videos featuring her, titled "Pyar mein kabhi kabhi" and the Sufi classic "Allah hoo" (2017). Indian TV channel Tata Sky released two Indian ghazal videos featuring her in their maiden venture featuring "Main aur meri Awaargi" and "Sukoon-e-dil" (2015).

In 2011, Pandit collaborated with popular Punjabi singer and actor Harbhajan Mann for the song Sun Mere Chann Mahiya for the album Heer Ranjha (OST).

In 2012, Pandit was introduced in the Tamil playback singing industry with a hat trick of releases for composer Yuvan Shankar Raja. Vettai, Billa II and Aadhi Baghavan fetching her the finest reviews for her renditions and also winning awards for the same.

=== Television ===
Pandit's first reality television show as a playback singer in 2008, Mission Ustaad on Channel 9x, was produced by the United Nations and judged by A. R. Rahman and Javed Akhtar. The show was one of the biggest television series presented by the United Nations and had accomplished singers from Bollywood performing together for various causes for the United Nations.

Pandit hosted and presented the television singing show Asia's Singing Superstar (2016) with Pakistani actor Ahsan Khan telecasted in Dubai, Pakistan and several Asian countries, judged by Shankar Mahadevan and Shafqat Amanat Ali Khan on ZEE TV and GEO TV.

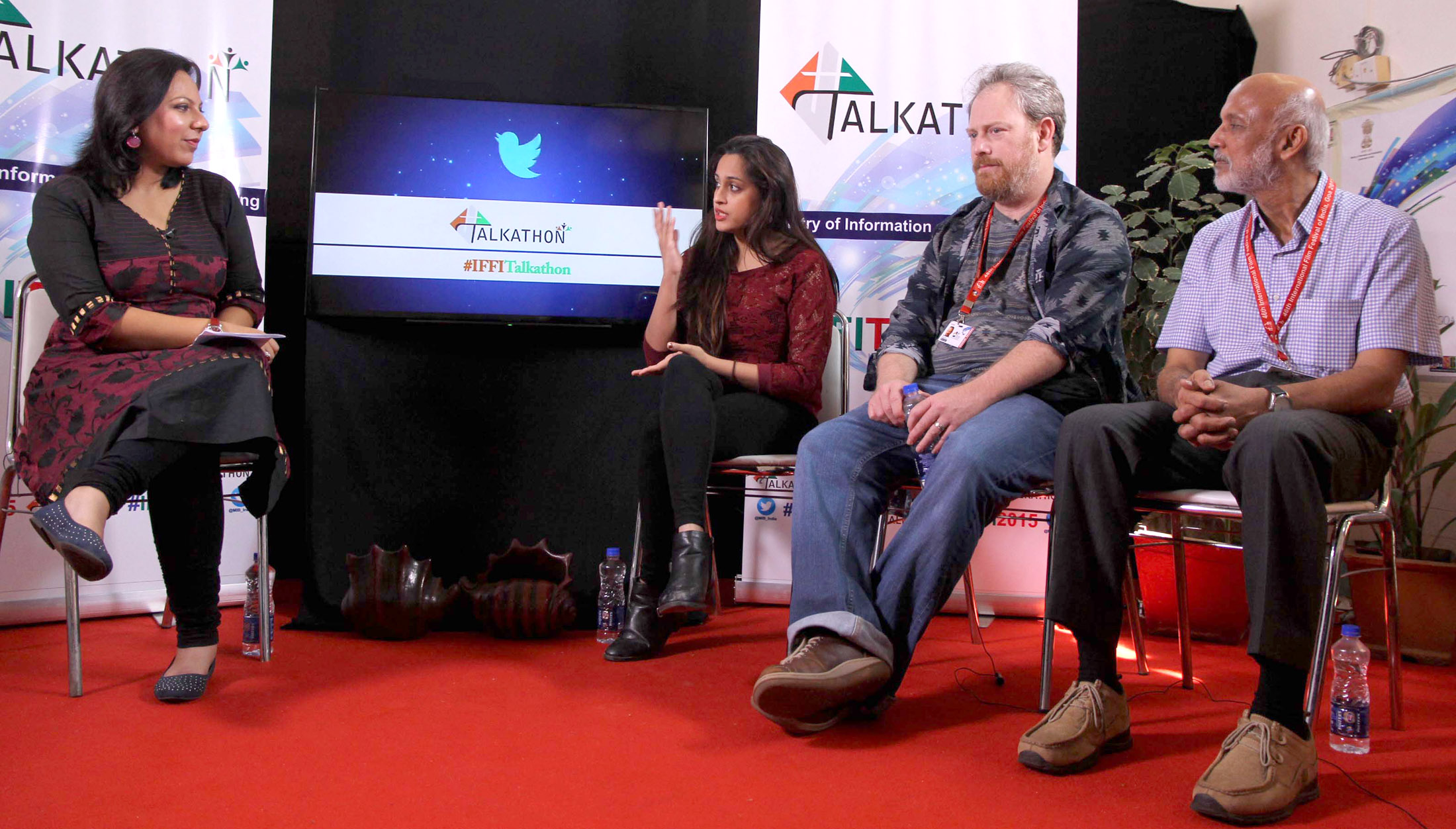
Shweta Pandit (second from left), IFFI (2015)

== Personal life ==
In the summer of 2015, Pandit got engaged by the river Seine in Paris and a year later in July 2016, she married Ivano Fucci, an Italian film producer, in a traditional Indian wedding held in Jodhpur. Pandit delivered their daughter, Izana, on 8 February 2020, amid the COVID-19 pandemic in Florence, Italy.

== Discography ==
=== Hindi ===
- Sardaar Gabbar Singh (2016) - "Pariyon Si"
- Guddu Ki Gun (2015) - "Reh-bara Ve"
- Raja Natwarlal (2014) - "Tere Hoke Rehengay" (reprise)
- Lekar Hum Deewana Dil (2014) - "Khalifa", "Beqasoor"
- Highway (2014) - "Heera"
- Satya 2 (2013) - "Tu Nahi"
- Zanjeer (2013) - "Katilana"
- Satyagraha (2013) - "Satyagraha"
- David (2013)
- Main Krishna Hoon (2013)
- Cigarette Ki Tarah (2012)
- Chaar Din Ki Chandni (2012)
- Joker (2012)
- Will You Marry Me? (2012)
- Tell Me O Kkhuda (2011)
- Ladies vs Ricky Bahl (2011)
- Mere Brother Ki Dulhan (2011)
- Yeh Dooriyan (2011)
- Khap (2011)
- Bhindi Baazaar Inc. (2011)
- Angel (2011)
- Yamla Pagla Deewana (2011)
- Prateeksha (2011)
- Hisss (2010) (Soundtrack artist)
- Hello Darling (2010)
- Antardwand (2010)
- Do Dilon Ke Khel Mein (2010)
- My Friend Ganesha 3 (2010) [Animation]
- 3 Nights 4 Days (2009)
- Fast Forward (2009)
- Vaada Raha (2009)
- Aamras (2009)
- Agyaat (2009)
- Zor Lagaa Ke...Haiya! (2009)
- Kaashh... Mere Hote! (2009)
- Deshdrohi (2008) - "Tu Jaan Se", "Tujhe Dekhoon To"
- Phoonk (2008)
- Sarkar Raj (2008) - "Jhini Jhini"
- Welcome (2007)
- Partner (2007)
- Ram Gopal Varma Ki Aag (2007)
- Mr. Hot Mr. Kool (2007)
- Shiva (2006)
- Kattputli (2006)
- Kabhi Alvida Naa Kehna (2006)
- Teesri Aankh: The Hidden Camera (2006)
- Fight Club (2006)
- Neal 'n' Nikki (2005)
- Dil Jo Bhi Kahey... (2005)
- James (2005)
- Iqbal (2005)
- Naach (2004)
- Tauba Tauba (2004)
- Julie (2004)
- Gayab (2004)
- Aetbaar (2004)
- Stumped (2003)
- Nayee Padosan (2003)
- Rudraksh (2003)
- Aap Mujhe Achche Lagne Lage (2002)
- Soch (2002)
- Haasil (2002)
- Ye Kya Ho Raha Hai (2002)
- The Perfect Husband (2002)
- Mohabbatein (2000)
- Raju Chacha (2000)
- Dil Kya Kare (1999)
- Saaz (1998)

=== Telugu ===
Year	Film(s)	Song(s)	Music Director	Co-artist(s)
2004	Maayam	"Meriseti"	Ajay–Atul	Kunal Ganjawala
2005	Allari Bullodu	"Mogavada Mathi"	M. M. Keeravani	Tippu
2005	Bhageeratha	"O Prema Nuvve"	Chakri	Karthik
2005	James	"Aakaasham Sindhuram"	Bapi Tutul, Nithin Raikwar	Sonu Nigam
2005	James	"Jeevitham Amrutham"	Bapi Tutul, Nithin Raikwar	
2005	James	"Naa Gundello"	Bapi Tutul, Nithin Raikwar	Sonu Nigam
2005	James	"Vaade Hero"	Bapi Tutul, Nithin Raikwar	
2005	James	"Udainche Kiranalu"	Bapi Tutul, Nithin Raikwar	Sonu Nigam
2005	Sri	"Are Chi Chi"	Sandeep Chowta	Rajesh Krishnan, Nikita Nigam
2006	Shock	"Cycle Ekkki"	Ajay–Atul	Chakri
2006	Shock	"Premante"	Ajay–Atul	
2006	Bhagyalakshmi Bumper Draw	"Maye Chesindi"	Chakri	Udit Narayan, Aadarshini
2006	Shiva	"Police Police"	Ilaiyaraaja	Ninad Kamat
2008	Kotha Bangaru Lokam	"Nenani Neevani"	Mickey J. Meyer	
2009	Adavi	"Kanti Paapa"	Bapi–Tutul	Vicky B.Joshi
2009	Adavi	"Agyaatame Agyaatame"	Bapi–Tutul	
2009	Ganesh: Just Ganesh	"Lalla Lai"	Mickey J. Meyer	Krishna Chaitanya
2010	Maro Charitra	"Ye Teega Puvvuno"	Mickey J. Meyer	
2010	Maro Charitra	"Bale Bale Magadivoy"	Mickey J. Meyer	
2010	Maro Charitra	"Ninnu Nannu"	Mickey J. Meyer	Srimathumitha
2010	Leader	"Aunana Kaadana"	Mickey J. Meyer	Naresh Iyer
2010	Leader	"Rajasekhara"	Mickey J. Meyer	
2010	Inkosaari	"Vaadey Na Vaadu"	Mahesh Shankar	
2010	Chethilo Cheyyesi	"Naa Maataga"	Bunty	
2011	Bejawada	"Ninnu Chusina"	Amar Mohile	Javed Ali
2011	Badrinath	"Vasudhara"	M. M. Keeravani	M. M. Keeravani
2011	Rajanna	"Goodu Chediri"	M. M. Keeravani	
2011	Panjaa	"Ela Ela"	Yuvan Shankar Raja	Haricharan
2011	Panjaa	"Kshanam Kshanam"	Yuvan Shankar Raja	
2012	David Billa (D)	"Hrudhayam Naalo"	Yuvan Shankar Raja	
2012	Bodyguard	"Endhukoo"	S. Thaman	Haricharan, S. Thaman
2012	Shirdi Sai	"Amararama"	M. M. Keeravani	
2013	Seethamma Vakitlo Sirimalle Chettu	"Inka Cheppale"	Mickey J. Meyer	Rahul Nambiar
2013	Toofan	"Vechanaina"	Meet Bros	
2013	David (D)	"Nee Naa Premaki"	Prashant Pillai	Naresh Iyer
2013	Satya 2	"Evevo Pichchi"	Nitin Raikwar	Leonard Victor
2013	Satya 2	"Nuvvu Leka Nenu Lenu"	Nitin Raikwar	Sreekanth
2014	Chandamama Kathalu	"E Kadha"	Mickey J. Meyer	Sanam Puri
2014	Mukunda	"Nandalaala"	Mickey J. Meyer	
2015	Size Zero	"Mella Mellaga"	M. M. Keeravani	
2017	Om Namo Venkatesaya	"Anandam"	M. M. Keeravani	Sarath Santhosh
2017	Mahanubhavudu	"Eppudainna"	S. Thaman	
2021	Pelli SandaD	"Premante Enti"	M. M. Keeravani	Haricharan
2024	Bhoot Police	"Idhega Prema"	Sachin–Jigar	Armaan Malik

=== Tamil ===
Year	Films	Songs
2018	Pyaar Prema Kaadhal	I will never let you go, Never let me go, It's over
2015	Inji Iduppazhagi	Mella Mella
2014	Anjaan	
2013	David	
2013	Aadhi Bhagavan	
2012	Billa II	
2012	Vettai	

=== Punjabi ===
- Heer and Hero (2013)
- Viyah 70 km (2013)
- Power Cut (2012)
- Pinky Moge Wali (2012)
- Lagda Ishq Hogaya (2009)
- Heer Ranjha (2009)

=== Bengali ===
- Abhimaan (2016) - "Mon Bechara"
- Inspector Notty K (2018) - "Chai Na Kichui"

=== Dubbing ===
- High School Musical 2 (2007)
- High School Musical (2006)

=== Spiritual and Sanskrit devotional albums ===
- Mahalakshmi with Padma Vibhushan Pandit Jasraj
- Dashavatar with Rattan Mohan Sharma
- Ganesha with Shankar Mahadevan
- Sukh Samriddhi Suraksha with Shrradha Pandit
- Raaz Diyan Gallan with Gurmit Singh
- The Stars with Gurmit Singh

== Awards and nominations ==
Shweta won her first Filmfare Award for Best Female Playback Singer – Telugu for Kotha Bangaru Lokam (2009), for the song Nenani Neevani, by Mickey J Meyer. She also won the Radio Mirchi Best Female Playback Singer for her first Tamil hit solo Idhayam, from Billa 2 (2012) and the MAA Award for Telugu Best Female Playback Singer for the Nagarjuna starrer Shirdi Sai (2013) for the song Amararaama, composed by M. M. Keeravani.

== Controversy ==
As per the reports, music composer Anu Malik harassed Shweta when she was 15 years old. Pandit called Malik "paedophile and sexual predator" in a long note shared on the social networking service X in October 2018.
