= Suman Sridhar =

Artist

Suman Sridhar The Black Mamba
- Also known as: The Black Mamba
- Instruments: Voice, piano
- Website: www.youtube.com/sumansridhar

Suman Sridhar is a singer, songwriter, and actor. Sridhar works in music, performance art, theatre and film. Suman is trained in Bharat Natyam classical dance and Indian Classical music and studied Western Classical Music, Women's & Gender Studies and Visual Arts from Mason Gross Rutgers University, USA. Suman has sung chart topping Bollywood film songs. Her performances include venues like National Centre for the Performing Arts (India), Southbank Centre (UK), BBC- World Service (UK), MTV India, Sound Trek (Fox Traveller India), NH7 Weekender (India), Radio Mirchi Music Awards (India), Mijwan Fashion Show (India), Jazzmandu (Nepal), Galle Literary Festival (Sri Lanka), The Quarter: Royal Opera House (India), The Great Escape Festival (UK), One Billion Rising (India) etc.

Her work has been part of art exhibitions such as Transformation 19124 (Philadelphia), Sarai Reader 09 (India), What Happened 2081? (German) and Between the Waves at dOCUMENTA (13) (Germany). Suman has produced, written and performed in original works such as Yoni Ki Baat (South Asian Women's Collective, USA), The Flying Wallas: Opera Noir (Prithvi Theatre Festival, India) Fall In Line and All That Remains is Flight: a conversation between Sappho and Medusa. She co-produced and acted in her debut feature film Ajeeb Aashiq/Strange Love by filmmaker Natasha Mendonca which premiered at the International Film Festival Rotterdam, 2016 and received the Bright Future Award nomination and the jury prize at the Lesbisch Schwule Filmtage Hamburg International Queer Film Festival. Suman's music act The Black Mamba The Black Mamba inaugurated the 20th Contemporary Arts Festival, VideoBrasil_Sesc, São Paulo (2017) the Kochi Muziris Biennale, India (2016) and headlined at the Ziro Music festival, India (2016). The Black Mamba's live cinema piece Land of the Breasted Woman won a Sesc_Videobrasil residency prize at the Wexner Center for the Arts (USA) and had a screening at the 11th Berlin Biennale for Contemporary Art.

== Career ==
In its 2014 listing of "25 Greatest Indian Rock Songs of the last 25 Years", Rolling Stone India featured Punk Bhajan.

== Discography ==
Suman Sridhar released the album STD by Sridhar/Thayil in 2012.

=== Filmography ===
Year	Film	Songs	Language	Label
2016	Ajeeb Aashiq / Strange Love	Music Director	English/Hindi	Transient Films
2016	Jaundya Na Balasaheb	"Mona Darling"	Marathi	Zee Studios
2015	Bombay Velvet	"Fifi"	Hindi	Sony Music
2012	Talaash	"Muskaanein Jhooti Hai"	Hindi	T-series
2011	Shaitan	"Hawa Hawai", "Khoya Khoya Chand"	Hindi	Apple Music
2011	404 Error Not Found	"Kya Dekh Raha Hai"	Hindi	Saga Music
2011	Luv Ka The End	"Tonight"	English	Apple Music

== Awards ==
Year	Award	Category	Role	Result	Ref.
2017	Sesc_Videobrasil	Residency award at Wexner Center for the Arts for Ajeeb Aashiq/Strange Love	Co-producer, Lead Actor, Music director	Won	{{}}
2017	LSF Hamburg International Queer Film Festival	Jury Prize, Best Film for Ajeeb Aashiq/Strange Love	Co-producer, Lead Actor, Music director	Won	{{}}
2013	Times of India Film Awards	Best Female Playback Singer	Singer	Nominated	
2013	MTV Video Music Awards India	Best Female Indie Artist	Singer-Songwriter-Producer	Nominated	
2013	Jack Daniel's Rock Awards	Band of the Year, Album of the Year, Song of the Year, Best Female Vocalist	Singer-Songwriter-Producer	Nominated	
2013	Femina Women's Awards	Music Category	Singer-Songwriter	Nominated	
2012	Mirchi Music Awards	Upcoming Female Vocalist of the Year	Singer	Nominated	
2012	Color Screen Awards	Best Female Playback Singer	Singer	Nominated	
2009	Jack Daniel's Rock Awards	Emerging Band of the Year	Singer-Songwriter-Producer	Won	
