= Prashant Pillai =

Indian composer and producer (born 1981)

- Born: 8 September 1981 (age 44)
- Origin: Pune, Maharashtra, India
- Genres: Film music; film score; sonic branding; new-age; electronic; world; soul; pop
- Occupations: bandleader; composer
- Instruments: Percussions; piano
- Years active: 2000–present
- Labels: Madras Blues Records (present)
- Website: PrashantPillai.com

Prashant Pillai (born 8 September 1981) is an Indian music composer who predominantly does Malayalam language films.

== Early career ==
After completing his Sound engineering in Chennai, he went on to work with A.R.Rahman. After a short stint with him, he moved on and settled in Pune, where he started scoring for ad jingles, web sonics, and short films. Pillai considers A.R.Rahman to be his professional guide and mentor.

In early 2004, Pillai got his first break to compose a radio jingle and then went on to compose jingles, for both radio and television consumption.

In the year 2007, Prashant scored music for Bejoy Nambiar's, critically acclaimed short film Rahu where he teamed with singer K. S. Krishnan. Bejoy's uncanny knack of selecting unusual and experimental sounds, resulted in Prashant working on a soundtrack, which he still claims to be his best. Rahu soundtrack features Murtaza and Qadir Khan, sons of the Ustad Ghulam Mustafa Khan. They feature in the soundtrack for the Sufi song, "Betaabi". This song was later used in a Malayalam film City of God.

== Film scoring and soundtracks ==
Prashant's first break in feature films came when debutant Lijo Jose Pellissery roped him for the Malayalam film Nayakan, in March 2010. The film featured actors like Indrajith, Thilakan, Siddique and Jagathy Sreekumar in pivotal roles. Academy Award winner A. R. Rahman released the music of the movie.

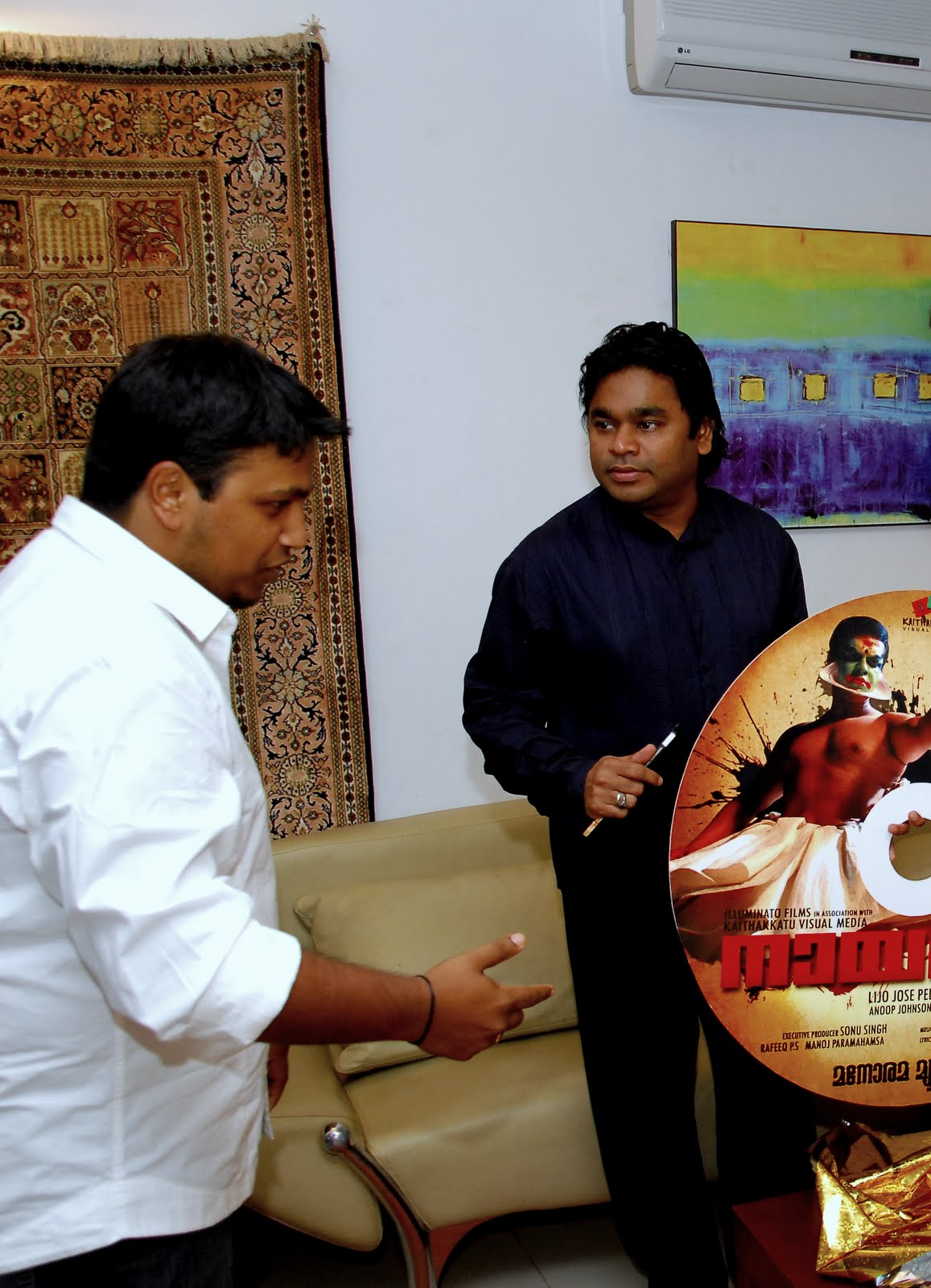
A.R.Rahman releasing Prashant Pillai's music – Nayakan OST

Prashant's mentor A.R.Rahman released the soundtrack of Nayakan on 16 March 2010, at Rahman's Panchathan Studios in Chennai. The Nayakan soundtrack features, 6 songs, one of which is sung by Indrajith (the lead of the film) himself. Prashant worked on this project for over one and a half years, and has fused in elements that is new to the Malayali audience.

In 2011, Prashant collaborated with Lijo once again for City of God which opened to mixed reviews. The movie stars Prithviraj and Indrajith as pivotal characters, along with Parvathi, Rima Kallingal and Shwetha Menon.

In 2011, he made his debut into commercial cinema with the Bollywood film Shaitan, directed by his now close friend, mentor and director Bejoy Nambiar, for which Pillai has scored majority of the songs. The film, produced by Anurag Kashyap has a unique soundscape to it; co-composed by eminent composers like Ranjit Barot, Amar Mohile and Anupam Roy. In the same year Prashant scored the original background music for the Malayalam film Bombay March 12 starring National Award winner Mammootty directed by screenwriter Babu Janardhan.

2012 saw Prashant scoring the background music for Siddarth Bharathan's Nidra a remake of his father Bharathan's 1981 film also titled Nidra. The film wasn't a commercial hit, but the film and its score was appreciated for its definitive style.Prashant also scored background music for MTV Rush, a series of 12 short stories on the leading music and entertainment television channel MTV, directed by Bejoy Nambiar of Shaitan fame.

Jan 2013 saw the release of Prashant's third soundtrack for Bejoy Nambiar, in his film, David. The soundtrack, which was supervised and co-produced by Prashant, is a compilation of various bands like Bram Fatura, Light Years Explode, MaatiBaani as also artists like Remo Fernandes, Anirudh Ravichander and Mikey McCleary. Apart from sound design, Prashant's tracks in the film feature eminent singers like Lucky Ali, Karthik, Shweta Pandit and Naresh Iyer. The film stars Vikram, Neil Nitin Mukesh, Jiiva, Isha Sharvani and Tabu among others, released in Hindi, Tamil and Telugu. He also composed the background score for the Hindi film Issaq directed by Manish Tiwary.

Post City of God Prashant composed the music for Lijo Jose Pellissery's Malayalam musical film titled Amen. The music became very popular and the film subsequently became a major blockbuster. The album featured artists like Ramya Nambeesan, Alyssa Mendonsa and Lucky Ali. This is a romantic comedy featuring actors Indrajith Sukumaran, Fahadh Faasil, Swati of Subramaniapuram fame and Kalabhavan Mani among others. Prashant was subsequently roped in by veteran filmmaker Lal Jose for Ezhu Sundara Rathrikal.

In 2014, composed for Ajith Pillai's Mosayile Kuthira Meenukal and debutant Santhosh Nair's Money Ratnam. 2015 saw four of his films release one of which was Double Barrel, his fourth collaboration with filmmaker Lijo Jose Pellissery and his debut Tamil film Andhra Mess.

== Awards ==
- 2013–16th Asianet Film Awards 2014 – Best Music Director – Amen
- 2013 – TTK Prestige-Vanitha Film Awards – Best Music Director – Amen

== Selected discography ==
Year	Title	Genre	Group	Label
2003	Om Ganeshaya Namaha (as Prashant Pillai)	Devotional	–	Independent
2005	Amhi Puneri (as Prashant Pillai)	Pop	–	Independent
2011	debut (as Prashant Pillai)	World/Fusion/Lounge	Groove Loves Company	Madras Blues Rechords

== Filmography ==
=== Feature films ===
Year	Title	Language	Notes
2010	Nayakan	Malayalam	Songs and Background Score
2011	City of God	Malayalam	Songs and Background Score
2011	Shaitan	Hindi	7 of 14 songs featured the film
2011	Bombay March 12	Malayalam	Background Score only.
2012	Nidra	Malayalam	Background Score only.
2012	Nee Ko Njaa Cha	Malayalam	Songs only.
2013	David	Hindi / Tamil	3 Songs
2013	Amen	Malayalam	Songs and Background Score
2013	5 Sundarikal	Malayalam	Song and Background Score for Isha
2013	Sixteen	Hindi	3 Songs and Background Score
2013	Issaq	Hindi	Background Score only.
2013	Zachariayude Garbhinikal	Malayalam	Background Score only.
2013	Ezhu Sundara Rathrikal	Malayalam	Songs and Background Score
2014	Mosayile Kuthira Meenukal	Malayalam	Songs and Background Score
2014	Money Ratnam	Malayalam	Songs and Background Score
2014	Mamachya Gavala Jaaoo Yaa	Marathi	Songs and Background Score
2015	Chandrettan Evideya	Malayalam	Songs and Background Score
2015	Double Barrel	Malayalam	Songs and Background Score
2015	Rockstar	Malayalam	Songs and Background Score
2016	Wazir	Hindi	1 song only.
2016	Anuraga Karikkin Vellam	Malayalam	Songs and Background Score
2017	Angamaly Diaries	Malayalam	Songs and Background Score
2017	Sakhavu	Malayalam	Songs and Background Score
2017	Keshava	Telugu	Background Score only
2017	Varnyathil Ashanka	Malayalam	Songs and Background Score
2017	Solo	Malayalam / Tamil	1 Song + Background Score ( for Blind )
2018	Mukkabaaz	Hindi	Background Score only
2018	Ee.Ma.Yau	Malayalam	Songs and Background Score
2018	Andhra Mess	Tamil	Songs and Background Score
2018	Padayottam (2018 film)	Malayalam	Songs and Background Score
2018	French Viplavam	Malayalam	Songs and Background Score
2019	Unda	Malayalam	Songs and Background Score
2019	Jallikattu	Malayalam	Songs and Background Score
2019	Ranarangam	Telugu	Background score, 2 songs only
2019	Mariyam Vannu Vilakkoothi	Malayalam	Additional songs only.
2019	Sayanna Varthakal	Malayalam	Songs and Background Score
2019	Chappad Phaad Ke	Hindi	Independent film directly released on OTT platform, Hotstar.Songs and Background Score
2020	Bamfaad	Hindi	Background Score only.Directly released on OTT platform, ZEE5
2020	Saajan Bakery	Malayalam	Songs and Background Score
2020	Taish	Hindi	2 songs only
2021	Chathuram	Malayalam	
2022	Kathir	Tamil	
2023	Malaikottai Vaaliban	Malayalam	
2025		Malayalam	

Moonwalk (film)#Cast

=== Short films ===
Year	Title	Language	Notes
2007	Rahu	Malayalam	Co-composed with Krishnan. Credited as Prashant-Krishnan; Songs and Background Score
2012	Kaun Kamleshwar	Hindi	Songs and Background Score
2017	LAFS	Hindi	Background Score
