= Reflections (2005 film) =

Silent short film

- Directed by: Bejoy Nambiar
- Written by: Bejoy Nambiar
- Produced by: Bejoy Nambiar
- Starring: Mohanlal; Juhi Babbar; Vidula Bhave; Sunil Santanam; Ahlam Khan; Jaideep Pandit
- Cinematography: Satyajit Pande (Setu)
- Edited by: Akiv Ali; Anand. S. Iyer (Elvis Tittus)
- Music by: Vikram Biswas
- Production company: Getaway Job
- Distributed by: Getaway Job
- Release date: 2005
- Running time: 10 minutes
- Country: India

Reflections is a 2005 silent short film written, produced and directed by Bejoy Nambiar, starring Mohanlal, Juhi Babbar, and Vidula Bhave.

== Cast ==
- Mohanlal
- Juhi Babbar
- Vidula Bhave
- Sunil Santanam
- Ahlam Khan
- Jaideep Pandit

== Production ==
Reflections is the debut directorial of Bejoy Nambiar. He used the money he saved for five short films for this short film. The film was shot in three days, the post-production was completed in eight months. The movie contains no dialogue
