= Shaitan (film) =

2011 Indian film by Bejoy Nambiar

- Theatrical release poster
- Directed by: Bejoy Nambiar
- Screenplay by: Megha Ramaswamy; Bejoy Nambiar
- Produced by: Anurag Kashyap; Sunil Bohra; Guneet Monga
- Starring: Rajeev Khandelwal; Rajkummar Rao; Kalki Koechlin; Pawan Malhotra; Shiv Panditt; Gulshan Devaiah; Neil Bhoopalam; Kirti Kulhari; Rukhsaar Rehman; Rajit Kapoor; Sheetal Menon
- Cinematography: R. Madhi
- Edited by: A. Sreekar Prasad
- Music by: Prashant Pillai; Amar Mohile; Ranjit Barot; Anupam Roy; Bhayanak Maut; Mikey McCleary
- Production companies: Tipping Point Films; Anurag Kashyap Films; Getaway Films; Bohra Bros
- Distributed by: Viacom 18 Motion Pictures
- Release date: 10 June 2011
- Running time: 121 minutes
- Country: India
- Language: Hindi

Shaitan (transl. Devil) is a 2011 Indian Hindi-language neo-noir crime thriller film directed by Bejoy Nambiar in his feature film debut and produced by Anurag Kashyap, Sunil Bohra, Guneet Monga and Nambiar himself under the banners Anurag Kashyap Films and Getaway Films, which was co-produced and distributed by Viacom18 Motion Pictures. The script was written by Nambiar and Megha Ramaswamy. The film stars Rajeev Khandelwal, Kalki Koechlin, Gulshan Devaiah, Shiv Panditt, Neil Bhoopalam, Kirti Kulhari, Rajit Kapoor, Pawan Malhotra and Rajkummar Rao. Based on the 2007 murder of Adnan Patrawala incident, the film revolves around five friends who want to live an adventurous life who get embroiled in a crime.

Bejoy Nambiar initially planned the script of this incident for Ashok Amritraj who wanted to produce the film under Hyde Park Entertainment. The film was supposed to be shot in English language, with Los Angeles as the principal location for this story. However, due to the disapproval of the production company, Nambiar decided to change the scripting and setting with the film taking place in Mumbai. The delayed progress attributed due to the company's exit and Anurag Kashyap joined the project in mid-2010, who heard about the similarities of this story with his unreleased directorial debut Paanch, based on the 1976-1977 Joshi-Abhyankar serial murders. The film was shot entirely in Mumbai within 12 days.

Shaitan was released on 10 June 2011 across 575 screens in Mumbai. The film opened to positive responses from critics and audiences, praising the direction, setting, storyline, and screenplay, with praise directed at the performances and the technical aspects of the film. Additionally, it was a commercial success, grossing ₹390 million against a budget of ₹110 million. Additionally, the film received nominations at several award ceremonies, in which Shaitan won five Screen Awards and a Filmfare Award. It is considered a "cult classic" and described by film critics as "one among the films that defined the new wave of Bollywood".

== Plot ==
Shaitan starts off with Amy, who is mentally disturbed and deeply affected by the attempted suicide and eventual institutionalisation of her mother, Saira. She moves from Los Angeles to Mumbai, where she meets KC at a party her parents forcefully take her to. KC introduces her to his gang: Dash, Zubin, and Tanya. They lead a directionless life, having fun, drinking, using drugs, and driving around in a Hummer. On one such occasion, they start racing a random car and win. In the celebration rush, they run over two people riding on a scooter, killing them instantly.

They quickly leave the spot but are easily tracked down by a slimy cop, Inspector Malwankar, who demands ₹25 lakh to drop the case. Dash tells them about a friend who faked his own brother's kidnapping and extracted ₹20 lakhs from his own parents. After Amy volunteers to be the kidnapping victim, they hatch a plan. Upon receiving the ransom call, Amy's father, contrary to their expectations, immediately approaches Police Commissioner Pratap Soren for help. Soren assigns an upright cop, Arvind Mathur, to solve the case unofficially, as he is on suspension after throwing a corporator from the first floor of his own house for allegedly beating up a woman. Inspector Mathur is shown to be having a disturbed married life and nearly divorces his wife.

The group of youngsters then hides in a shady hotel, acting upon the plan hatched by Dash. When Tanya is nearly raped by a man, they react violently and kill him. They escape from the lodge and hide out in a cinema hall, where Amy finds a packet of cocaine in Dash's satchel. Tanya is deeply disturbed by their recent actions and convinces Zubin to take her home. While Zubin leaves to find a taxi, Tanya gets into an altercation with Amy. Amy, while under the influence of cocaine, is convinced that the phone call that Tanya was making to her sister was actually to the police. In the physical confrontation that follows, KC smashes Tanya's head into a wall and leaves her bleeding and unconscious. Zubin, upon returning, finds the gruesome scene, and thinking Tanya is dead, flees. He is later arrested by the police while attempting to leave the city. Dash takes Amy and KC to a church on the outskirts of Mumbai and instructs them to hide there while he tries to figure things out with Malwankar.

The arrested Zubin, in the meantime, reveals the entire scenario to the police. They track down Malwankar, who was attempting to escape with his wife. In the ensuing chase, Malwankar is nearly killed in a truck collision. While buying food, the exasperated KC sees his handicapped sister being traumatised by the media. He then calls his father and asks him for help. Using this call, the police trace the trio to the church. Upon returning to the church, KC tells the other two everything and tries to convince Amy to leave the church with him. Dash, however, confronts him, and the two get into a bloody confrontation. It ends with Dash beating KC to death. Dash then tries to get Amy to leave the church with him. However, a cocaine-fuelled Amy has a traumatic flashback involving her mother trying to drown her as a child. In this frenzy, she stabs Dash, who is trying to restrain her. She is then found by Inspector Mathur.

The police, despite knowing the truth, get the three surviving friends to sign a statement saying that Dash had kidnapped all four. This is done to save the reputation of the much-maligned police force. Mathur then meets his wife, indicating a possible reconciliation. The film ends with Amy being resigned to the convent, which she always feared, albeit with her mother's name (Saira).

== Cast ==
- Rajeev Khandelwal as Inspector Arvind Mathur
- Kalki Koechlin as Amrita Jayshankar, a.k.a. Amy
- Rajkummar Rao as Inspector Malvankar (Pintya) (extended cameo appearance)
- Shiv Panditt as Dushyant Sahu, a.k.a. Dash
- Neil Bhoopalam as Zubin Shroff
- Gulshan Devaiah as Karan Chaudhary, a.k.a. K.C.
- Kirti Kulhari as Tanya Sharma
- Rajit Kapoor as Anand Jayshankar
- Shivani Tanksale as Amy's Mother
- Pawan Malhotra as Commissioner Pratap Soren, Mumbai Police
- Nikhil Chinapa as Inspector Sandeep Srivastava
- Rukhsaar Rehman as Rubina
- Sheetal Menon as Nandini (Arvind's wife)
- Rajat Barmecha as Shomu (Cameo)
- Imran Rasheed as Rehmat

== Production ==
=== Development ===
Bejoy Nambiar, made a short film titled Reflections (2005) and a direct-to-television film Rahu (2008), before assisting Mani Ratnam, and served as an executive in Ratnam's production house Madras Talkies. When he won a prize for Gateway to Hollywood in 2009, Ashok Amritraj asked Nambiar to make a feature film for his Los Angeles-based production house Hyde Park Entertainment. For his feature film debut, he went to research about the murder of Adnan Patrawala, a 16-year-old teenage son of a businessperson from Mumbai, was kidnapped by his friends for ₹20 million (US$280,000) ransom and was murdered in August 2007, when the news broke out on television and print media. Nambiar initially planned to make the film in English which was titled Spiral and the film being set in Los Angeles. But as the plan did not work out, Nambiar decided to produce the film in Hindi and change the setting of the storyline to Mumbai, for which Amritraj disagreed and he decided to produce the film under his own banner Getaway Films. He co-wrote this script with Megha Ramaswamy, who simultaneously scripted the screenplay and story for Shekhar Kapur's Paani (which was later shelved).

As he could not fulfill the enormous budget for production, Anurag Kashyap agreed to co-produce and present the film in a smaller budget. Sunil Bohra and Guneet Monga who worked as executives in Kashyap's production banner Anurag Kashyap Films, served as the co-producer. Nambiar said that, "when Kashyap read the storyline, he found a striking resemblance to his unreleased directorial debut film Paanch, which was made in 2002, but never released due to censorship troubles. Paanch, which is based on Joshi-Abhyankar serial murders from 1976 and 1977, had a similar storyline, where five youngsters who wanted to have an adventurous life, and their greed for money, leads them embroiled in crime. Later, Kashyap directed Black Friday (which had a delayed release) and No Smoking, but he attempted to release Paanch multiple times, as things never came into fruition, he dropped the idea" Kashyap believed that Paanch was made ahead of time and wanted people to see his best work, which is the reason why Shaitan has been made.

=== Casting ===
Bejoy Nambiar approached Kalki Koechlin to play the lead role. Koechlin, who gained her breakthrough with Dev.D (2009), where her performance in the film received critical acclaim, decided to act in this film as she wanted to experiment in "dark" and "intense roles". She plays the role of a 17-year old angst-ridden teenager who had a troubled life. Nambiar cast actors who were part of films based on real-life incidents, including Neil Bhoopalam, who earlier played a character based on Shayan Munshi in No One Killed Jessica (2011); he said that "The idea was to bring in actors and a crew that understood the realistic space in cinema". Rajeev Khandelwal, Shiv Panditt, Kirti Kulhari and Gulshan Devaiah portrayed the role of Koechlin's friends in the film. Eventually, the entire lead cast members were in their mid-20s as Nambiar wanted to cover more younger audiences, especially in suburbans and multiplexes. Kashyap had referenced the casting and similarities to Paanch, where the actors had referenced the lead characters of that film — Sharat Saxena, Kay Kay Menon, Aditya Srivastava, Joy Fernandes and Tejaswini Kolhapure. Koechlin's character is based on that of Kolhapure's role in Paanch.

Gulshan Devaiah made his feature film debut with this film by playing Karan Chaudhary (KC). In an interview with Cinestaan, Nambiar said that "his character is mostly modelled on a 1980s rock-and-roll guy, not the way he dress but how his attitude". Initially, Gulshan was auditioned for Rajeev's character Arvind Mathur, a Police Inspector and made a test shoot featuring him as a cop. But as he was too young to play the cop, the role was later given to Rajeev and Gulshan was offered the role of KC, though Nambiar initially wanted Arjun Mathur and Namit Das to play that role. Rajkummar Rao, played the role of Malvankar, a corrupt-police officer, who had a screen presence of 15 minutes. Nambiar convinced Rajkummar to take the role as he did not want to appear in a role that is of a short duration.

=== Filming ===
Principal shooting began during April 2010 and Nambiar planned to shoot the film within 10–12 days. After being delayed multiple times due to financial constraints, the film went on floors in October. A slow motion action sequence was the first to be canned in the shoot. The team canned a kissing sequence featuring Koechlin and Kulhari. While Nambiar narrated the scene to Kulhari, she believed that it was a prank, but as the scene was about be really canned, which left her shocked. However, the kissing scene was completed within a single shot. 90% of the scenes were filmed in real locations across Mumbai. An interrogation scene between Rajeev Khandelwal and Pawan Malhotra was shot at a bungalow in Bandra's Pali Hill in Mumbai. Nambiar said that "it was Malhotra first day and also his first scene. But he got it right in the first take itself, understandably so as he is a veteran actor. Since Rajeev was well prepared for the scene too, it was wrapped up in one go." Another sequence featuring Rajiv and Bhoopalam was shot in Andheri.

One of the scenes had the lead actors wearing a burkha and walking towards Muhammad Ali Road. The shoot was interrupted due to residents from the locality, who offended men donning a burkha-attire religiously worn by Muslim women. Though Nambiar stepped down and explained about the film's shoot, the team had to cancel the filming mid-way following resident's protests. However, the shooting was completed within three hectic schedules and with the help of hidden cameras being placed across the locations. A scene featuring the lead cast were filmed during the occasion of Diwali, and soon after the team joined the celebrations at the Marine Drive. Bejoy Nambiar thought the scene was "real and vibrant" and decided to continue filming. Once shooting completed in mid-November, the team began post-production, with visual effects were supervised by Mumbai-based Pixion Studios. In June 2011, a promotional music video for Shaitan has been shot.

== Soundtrack ==
The soundtrack to Shaitan features 14 tracks all of them were composed by Prashant Pillai, Amar Mohile, Ranjit Barot, Anupam Roy and Bhayanak Maut. K. S. Krishnan, Sanjeev Sharma, Colin Terence, Abhishek, and Shradha wrote lyrics for the tracks. Initially Prashant Pillai was credited as the sole musician for the album and had composed seven tracks, but during the phase of pre-production Nambiar believed that working with multiple composers may benefit the film and four composers eventually joined this project. Mikey McCleary remixed the track "Hawa Hawai" from Mr. India (1987) composed by Laxmikant–Pyarelal and "Khoya Khoya Chand" from Kala Bazar (1960), scored by S. D. Burman. Though the latter was not featured in the film, it was released as a promotional track, post-release and also attached to the album The Bartender produced by Sony Music India. The soundtrack album was launched on 20 May 2011 at the Hard Rock Cafe in Mumbai, with the attendance of prominent musicians performing at the event along with the cast and celebrities. T-Series purchased the music rights for the film and distributed the album into the market.

== Release ==
During the post-production process, Viacom 18 Motion Pictures acquired the worldwide distribution rights of the film. The first look and trailer launch event was held on 22 April 2011 in Mumbai. The film's lead cast members involved in unique promotional activities through social networking sites, in order to attract youngsters and ensure the hype before its release. The promotional activities were handled by Candid Marketing, whose executive handled promotional campaigns at six BPOs in Mumbai and Delhi. A special screening was held on 6 June 2011 at Mumbai for the film's cast and crew were present during the event. On 9 June 2011, Nambiar hosted another screening for his mentor Mani Ratnam in Chennai, who appreciated the film and his work.

Shaitan released worldwide on 10 June 2011 in over 575 screens across India. Made on a budget of ₹110 million (US$1.2 million), the film grossed more than ₹397.6 million (US$4.2 million) and was commercially successful at the box-office. The film was made available in DVD from 25 September 2011, and is also available on the streaming service Netflix.

== Critical reception ==
The film received a positive response from critics. Taran Adarsh from Bollywood Hungama gave the film four out of five stars and said, "Shaitan is bound to raise eyebrows thanks to its contemporary, thrilling, hard-hitting and forceful content" and described it as "one of the most ingenious and entertaining thrillers"., gave three-and-a-half out of five stars saying it as "disturbing yet delectable film". Pankaj Sabnani from Glamsham gave the film four stars and stated it as a "spellbinding thriller with 'awesomeness' written all over it". Nikhat Kazmi from The Times of India gave it three-and-a-half out of five stars and wrote, "it turns the camera three-sixty degrees and brings you the grime of a subterranean sub-culture that throbs amidst a certain section of metropolitan maverick twenty-somethings." Anupama Chopra from NDTV gave three out of five stars and wrote "There are some terrific sequences, but as time flies the film slowly loses its steam, becomes repetitive and ends in a whimper". India Today's Kaveerie Bamzai stated the film as "brilliantly written" praising the performances of the young cast members.

Mayank Shekhar from Hindustan Times gave three out of five stars saying "the film derives itself almost wholly from a pop, counter-cultural new wave of late '90s that roughly defined independent films back then, mostly in Hollywood. The outcome may be partly pretentious; but it's largely satisfying still." Ankit Ojha of PlanetBollywood.com praised the film and its thematic element to a large extent, saying "Nambiar has managed to impress each and everyone of the discerning film viewer and movie buff", he called the film as "a must watch" because to "absorb the tonality of the film's context and subtext". Sanjukta Sharma of Mint stated that "The film could have been a superb piece of cinema with more control, a more interwoven script and an unflinching engagement with evil. Ultimately, it seems like a lukewarm follow-up to Kashyap's unreleased film Paanch and 2009 film Dev.D. Even so, Nambiar's imagination and pluck for visual orchestration is commendable which makes it a worthy-watch."

Writing for Daily News and Analysis, Blessy Chettiar said "Watch Shaitan for its original story, brilliant talent showcase by the cast, sound and editing teams. It might be the one of the most technically sound film you will have seen in a long time" giving three-and-a-half out of five". A critic from The New Indian Express wrote "‘Shaitan’ looks at the sub-zero level of moral values among a section of the urban young with a whimsical zest for a new kind of cinematic voice that is far removed from films about cops and desperados that we've come to know over the years." Komal Nahta of Koimoi.com said that "Shaitan is a well-made film with a rich background score, stylised cinematography and efficient performances as its high points". Contrary to the positive reviews, Raja Sen of Rediff.com gave two out of five stars and wrote "The film showcases some great performances but still feels longer than it's [sic] actual running time".

== Awards and nominations ==
Award	Date of ceremony (Note: Date is linked to the article about the awards held that year, wherever possible.)	Category	Recipients	Result	Ref.
Screen Awards	14 January 2012	Best Film	Shaitan	Nominated	
Screen Awards	14 January 2012	Best Director	Bejoy Nambiar	Nominated	
Screen Awards	14 January 2012	Best Actress	Kalki Koechlin	Nominated	
Screen Awards	14 January 2012	Best Actor in a Negative Role (Female)	Kalki Koechlin	Nominated	
Screen Awards	14 January 2012	Best Ensemble Cast	Rajeev Khandelwal, Shiv Panditt, Kalki Koechlin, Gulshan Devaiya, Neil Bhoopalam, Kirti Kulhari	Nominated	
Screen Awards	14 January 2012	Most Promising Debut Director	Bejoy Nambiar	Won	
Screen Awards	14 January 2012	Best Background Music	Ranjit Barot	Won	
Screen Awards	14 January 2012	Best Female Playback	Suman Sridhar	Nominated	
Screen Awards	14 January 2012	Best Cinematography	R. Madhi	Won	
Screen Awards	14 January 2012	Best Sound Design	Kunal Sharma	Won	
Screen Awards	14 January 2012	Best Screenplay	Bejoy Nambiar, Megha Ramaswamy	Nominated	
Screen Awards	14 January 2012	Best Editing	Sreekar Prasad	Nominated	
Screen Awards	14 January 2012	Best Action	Javed-Ejaaz	Nominated	
Zee Cine Awards	21 January 2012	Best Background Music	Ranjit Barot	Won	
Producers Guild Film Awards	27 January 2012	Best Screenplay	Bejoy Nambiar, Megha Ramaswamy	Nominated	
Producers Guild Film Awards	27 January 2012	Best Actor in a Supporting Role	Gulshan Devaiya	Nominated	
Filmfare Awards	29 January 2012	Best Background Score	Ranjit Barot	Won	
Filmfare Awards	29 January 2012	Best Male Debut	Shiv Panditt	Nominated	
Filmfare Awards	29 January 2012	Best Male Debut	Gulshan Devaiya	Nominated	
Filmfare Awards	29 January 2012	Best Debut Director	Bejoy Nambiar	Nominated	
Filmfare Awards	29 January 2012	Best Cinematography	R. Madhi	Nominated	
Stardust Awards	26 February 2012	Best Director	Bejoy Nambiar	Nominated	
Stardust Awards	26 February 2012	Best Actress	Kalki Koechlin	Nominated	
Stardust Awards	26 February 2012	Best Actor	Gulshan Devaiya	Nominated	
