= Prahlad Kakkar =

Indian advertising film director

- प्रहलाद कक्कड़
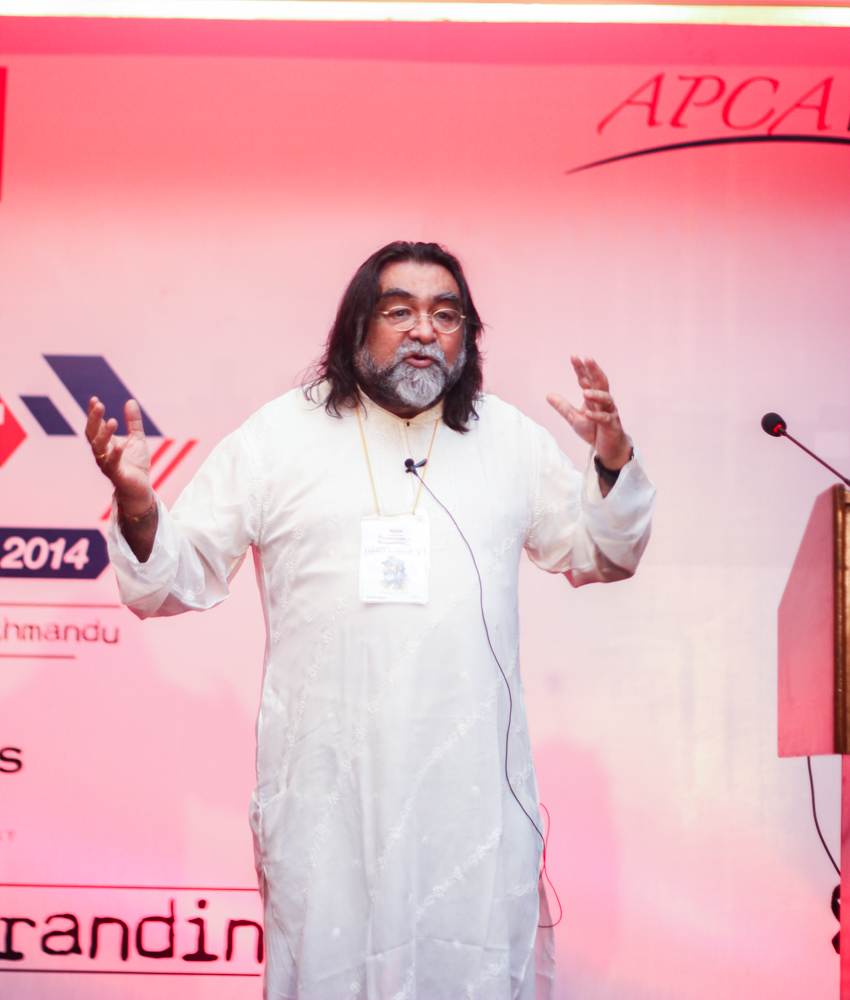
- Prahlad Kakkar speaking during The Himalayan Times Brandfest in Nepal
- Occupations: Advertising, Filmmaker
- Spouse: Mitali Dutt
- Children: 3

Prahlad Kakkar is an Indian ad film director, known for his work on a Pepsi TV commercial with Amitabh Bachchan and Sachin Tendulkar. He is the founder of Genesis Film Productions, established in 1977.

In 1995 he set up 'Lacadives', a scuba-diving school, alongside his wife, Mitali Kakkar at Kadmat Island, in collaboration with the Government of Lakshadweep. He also runs a coffee shop, and Casa Amore, a wine bar & restaurant, set up in Mumbai in 2001.

In 2016 he launched the School of Branding and Entrepreneurship in Mumbai in association with Subhash Ghai's Whistling Woods International.

== Early life ==
He did his initial schooling at St. Joseph's Academy, Dehradun and higher schooling from Sainik School, Kunjpura, Haryana. He later graduated in economics from Fergusson College, Pune.

== Career ==
Prahlad Kakkar joined advertising in 1971, as an Accounts Executive at ASP (Delhi), and after a year, he was transferred to the company's Bombay office. In 1972, he joined the renowned feature director, Shyam Benegal, as an assistant Director for films such as Ankur, Manthan, and Bhumika.

After training under Shyam Benegal, Mandeep Kakkar and Ravi Uppor, Prahlad Kakkar founded Genesis Film Productions in 1977.

Genesis Film Productions is also known for the short film "Bali" made in affiliation with the channel Star One. Prahlad Kakkar is also known for his popular Kamasutra ads. After Genesis, Prahlad Kakkar started a restaurant at Prithvi Theatre with Jennifer Kendal.

Prahlad Kakkar is the co-founder of ReefWatch Marine Conservation, set up in 1994, which aims at creating marine-life awareness. Prahlad Kakkar supports and plays an important role as the Chief Advisor and trustee of Natura Outdoor Education Trust.

In 1999, Kakkar was one of the few Indian directors to direct international commercials for clients like Unilever and PepsiCo in Burma, Vietnam, Pakistan, Bangladesh and the Asia Pacific Region. He also started the speciality Tea House in Bombay, the first of its kind in the country. In 2000 he received the prestigious Lifetime Achievement Award from IAAFA for his contribution to Advertising and Film Art.

=== Genesis Film Production Pvt. Ltd. ===
Prahlad Kakkar founded Genesis Film Production Pvt. Ltd. in 1977, after having assisted Shyam Benegal, one of India's most renowned art-house filmmakers. Clients of the company include Nestlé, PepsiCo, Brittania, and Levers. Prahlad has won several awards for technical excellence, Innovation and creativity in advertising over the years in India. Genesis won both gold and silver awards including campaign of the year for the Pepsi commercials at AAAI in 1996. The public films for Ceat won awards in the New York Festival of Advertising. Commercials directed by Prahlad have also been nominated for Lions at Cannes. Twenty – five years down the line Prahlad Kakkar earned himself a Lifetime Achievement Award by the IAAFA in the year 1999 and made Genesis the top Production House for two consecutive seasons for years 2003 and 2004 by the Brand Equity. He has helped create campaigns like "Yehi Hai Right Choice Baby! Aha!" Pepsi Ad, "The Zing Thing" Gold Spot Ad, "2 minutes!" Noodles Ad for Maggi, "Ting Ting Ti Ting" Britannia Biscuits Football Ad, "Zor ka Jhatka" for Limca and "It's different" for Maggi Ketchup.

=== Offspring and Offshoot ===
Genesis has given birth to Offspring and Offshoot, production companies that are owned by Mitali Dutt Kakkar. Prahlad Kakkar remains the Principal Director for her production houses as well.

=== Lacadives ===
Lacadives is part of the Underwater Federation of India and has established the Indian Scuba Diving Association to ensure adherence to safety norms in this industry. To further complement its activities Lacadives has set up an NGO called Reefwatch, whose mission is to create awareness amongst children through workshops and practical training about the fragile Marine Environment. Lacadives is also the first Dive Centre to have its own Live Aboard, Sea Urchin, a 55-foot vessel, 150 HP Scania Engine, with sleeping facilities for 8 passengers and four crew. A compressor, and desalination plant, centrally air-conditioned, with a 10-foot RIB and a diving platform.

=== Restaurants ===
Prahlad Kakkar has also been involved in restaurant design. He took on the initiative of reviving the culture of tea in India with a touch of sophistication, a venture which culminated in the Tea Centre, a restaurant designed by him at Churchgate, in association with the Tea Board of India.

In 1985, he ran a Gourmet Restaurant at the Prithvi Theater, Bombay with Jennifer Kendal Kapoor. In 2001, he started Casa Amore, an exclusive wine bar and restaurant. Prahlad has also created Papa Pancho for designer Mamta Sekhri. It is one of the few places in Mumbai that offers traditional, home-cooked Punjabi food. "Sarson da Saaga", Bombay's first "Slow food, Punjabi- home-style cooking" opened at IMAX in March 2002.

== Personal life ==
Prahlad Kakkar is married to Mitali Dutt Kakkar, the owner of the film companies Offspring and Offshoot. They have three sons Arnav, Varun and Anhjin. Prahlad Kakkar is dyslexic and so is his son Arnav.

Prahlad Kakkar has a passion for scuba diving and in 2000 he became a CMAS 2 Star Scuba Diving Instructor. His other interests include gourmet cooking, reading, swimming, snorkelling, squash and horse riding.

== Controversy ==
Prahlad Kakkar made a controversial statement about Amitabh Bachan, he said that Amitabh's name should be in the Guinness Book of world records because despite 17 flop movies he survived in the film industry, Amitabh Bachan's son Abhishek Bachan condemned his comments.
