= Remo Fernandes =

Indian-Portuguese musician (born 1953)

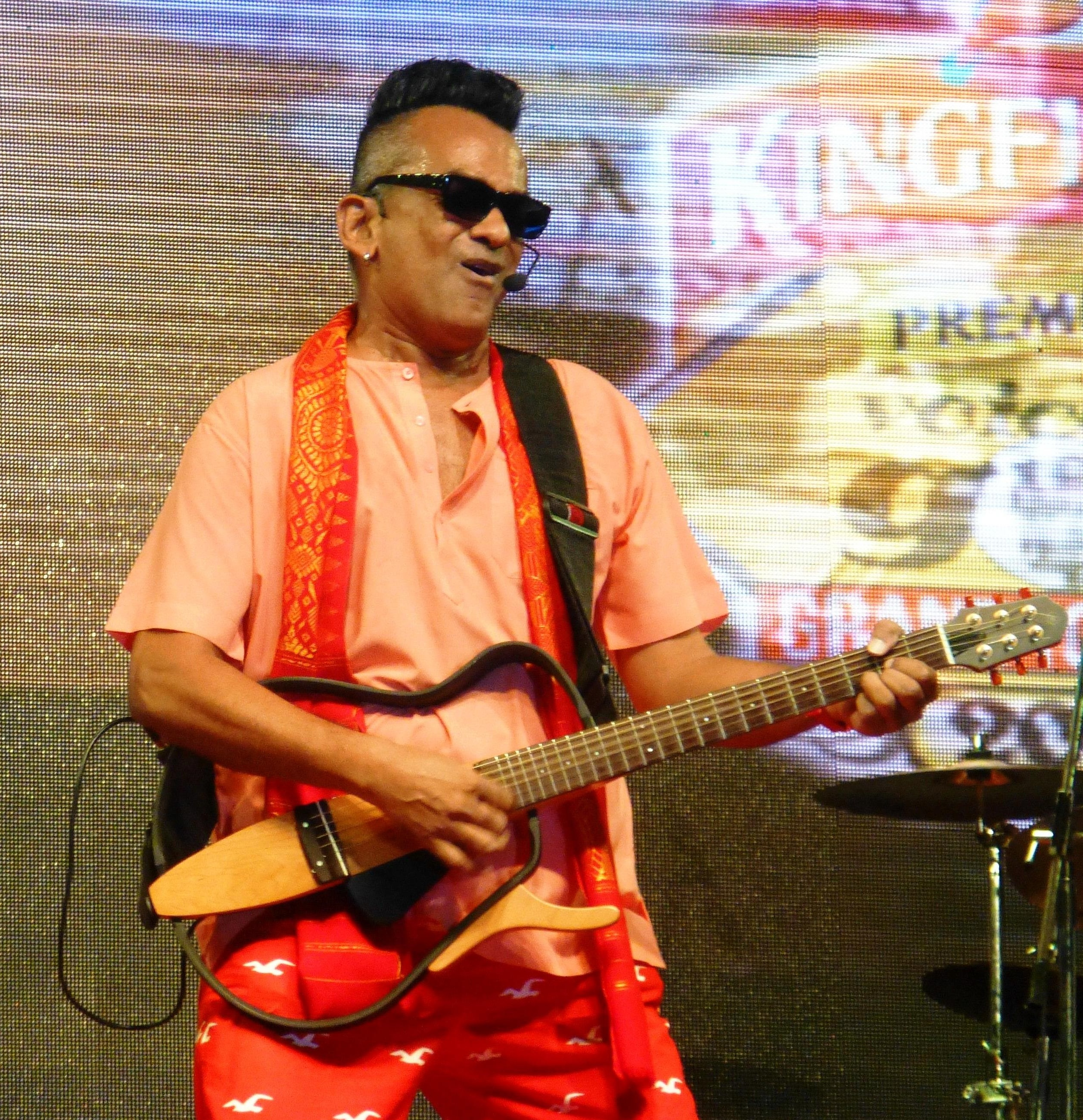
- Fernandes performing in 2014
- Born: Luís Remo de Maria Bernardo Fernandes; 8 May 1953 (age 73); Nova Goa, Goa, Portuguese India
- Citizenship: India (until 2011); Portugal (from 2011)
- Occupations: Musician; singer-songwriter; actor
- Years active: 1975–present
- Political party: Aam Aadmi Party (2013–2014)
- Spouses: Michele Delahaye (m. 1985, separated) Zenia Pereira (m. 2018)
- Children: 2
- Awards: Padma Shri (2007)
- Musical career
- Origin: Siolim, Goa, India
- Genres: Fusion, Indian rock
- Instruments: Guitar, flute
- Website: remofernandes.com

Luís Remo de Maria Bernardo Fernandes (born 8 May 1953) is an Indian-Portuguese singer and musician. Known as a pioneer of Indian pop music, he performs pop, rock, Indian fusion, and is also a film playback singer. His musical work is a fusion of many different cultures and styles that he has been exposed to as a child in Goa and in his later travels around the world. Such influences include Goan and Portuguese music, Sega music (from Mauritius and Seychelles), African music, Latin music (from Spain and South America), the music of erstwhile European communist states, those of the dance halls from Jamaica and Soca (from Trinidad and Tobago).

Writing and singing songs in English made his success more rare and distinctive in the context of the Bollywood-dominated, Hindi language-based, occasionally even disco music scene that was popular in the 1980s and 1990s. His compositions in English, reflecting life and socio-political happenings in India with which every Indian could identify. His Hindi pop/rock and film songs became instant hits with the Indian masses, earning him Gold, Platinum and Double Platinum Discs. A popular stage performer in India, he has also taken part in many music festivals around the world. He has performed with members of international groups such as Jethro Tull, Led Zeppelin and Queen.

He now writes and sings his songs in five different languages: English, Hindi, French, Portuguese and Konkani. He also holds an Overseas Citizenship of India card since acquiring Portuguese citizenship.

== Life and career ==
=== 1953–1977: Early life and musical influences ===
Luís Remo de Maria Bernardo Fernandes was born to the Nova Goa-based family of José António Bernardo Afonso Fernandes and Luiza Maria Zuzarte e Fernandes on 8 May 1953. He has a sister named Belinda, who sings Brazilian songs. Although brought up in a Catholic family, Fernandes states that he "realized that god is beyond religion". Fernandes' first introduction to rock music was at the age of seven, when a cousin returned from London with "Rock Around The Clock", a record by Bill Haley & His Comets. He spent the next decade listening to music of that era's most popular icons:

"After about a decade of going crazy over Elvis Presley, Cliff Richard, The Shadows, The Beatles and The Rolling Stones, one of the greatest influences in my life was the psychedelic music of the 70s..."

— In an interview to The Week.

In school, Fernandes developed his guitar playing skills along with a group of friends and formed a school band with them, named The Beat 4. He wrote his first songs around age 14 and won many prizes in all-Goa competitions.

After graduating from school, Fernandes went on to complete a bachelor's degree in Architecture from Sir J.J College of Architecture in Mumbai. He was greatly influenced by Lucio Miranda (Mario Miranda's cousin, who is an architect and musician). His love for music continued while in college, and he often skipped classes to work on his musical technique. He continued writing his own songs, playing solo or playing with different bands. He played with The Savages, one of Bombay's well-known bands back then, with whom he released an album, Ode to the Messiah, on Polydor Records in 1975. Bombay being one of the few cities in India at the time with a niche audience for rock music, Fernandes played in concerts and venues such as Shanmukhnanda Hall, Rang Bhavan, and in all the major college campuses of the city. Fernandes brought an Indian element to his music with his sitar/guitar, and taught himself to play the Indian flute.

=== 1977–1985: Career beginnings ===
After graduating, Fernandes traveled across Europe and North Africa between 1977 and 1980, performing with fusion rock bands and even releasing an album, Rock Synergie, in Paris in 1979. He then returned to Goa and immersed himself in its hippie culture. He met a group of travelling European artists, who named themselves the Amsterdam Balloon Company, and began playing at their concerts at Baga. He even invited them to perform at Miramar Beach. Later, Remo performed in Amsterdam with Lucas Amor, the violinist in this group, and release a record called Venus and the Moon in 1981. He also formed his own band of fusion music called Indiana with bass guitarist Abel, tabla player Lala and the percussionist Bondo.

Remo recorded his maiden album Goan Crazy (in 1984) and a subsequent album Old Goan Gold (in 1985) on a four-track cassette TEAC Portastudio recorder in his home under the banner of 'Goana Records'. In these albums he played all the instruments, sang all voices, and was the only composer of its music and lyrics. He engineered the recording and mixing and designed the album covers. He had cassettes produced in Bombay and personally distributed the cassettes from shop to shop in Goa with an illustrated book of poems he wrote (called Leads, published in 1980), and postcards and T-shirts he designed for his company, Gowana.

=== 1985: First marriage ===
On 13 January 1985, he married a young Frenchwoman named Michele Delahaye. Together, they have two sons, Noah and Jonah. He has an ancestral home in the village of Siolim, in Bardez taluka of Goa, where they all lived. Remo and Michele later separated.

=== 1986–1994: Pack That Smack, concerts, Jalwa and subsequent successes ===
After releasing his first hit album Pack That Smack in 1986 and Bombay City the next year, he became the highest-selling English rock musician in India and the only one in the country to be awarded Gold Discs for this category. Pack That Smack was his first album to be released by a national record company, CBS. This was an anti-drugs themed album, especially against addiction to heroin, which contained songs such as "Just a Hippie" and "Down with Brown", as well as asocio-political satire titled "Mr Minister", a nursery rhyme-styled song on politician who went to sleep once elected to power; and "So Wie Du", a recording of an award-winning live performance of his from the Dresden Song Competition. Bombay City contained hits such as "Against you/Against me", "Ocean Queen" and a hilarious take on the condition of telephone services in India, "Ode to Graham Bell".

Later in 1986, he was invited to play at an official government function in Goa for the Indian Prime Minister Rajiv Gandhi, who was visiting. There he sang a song titled "Hello Rajiv Gandhi", which spoke about the hurried completion of Kala Academy just before Prime Minister Gandhi's arrival, and requested Gandhi to visit Goa repeatedly to increase the speed of other construction work. The song caused an uproar in the local press and subsequently in the national press. Remo mailed these critical press clippings to the Prime Minister, who immediately replied saying that he and his wife Sonia had loved the song and had found nothing objectionable in it. This letter, together with the whole story in pictures, was published in many publications in the country.

Later the same year, Remo sang in Bombay at a concert called Aid Bhopal, aimed at raising funds for victims of the Bhopal gas tragedy, in which he sang two of his songs, "Pack that Smack" and "Ode to Graham Bell". To his surprise, both his songs were televised by Doordarshan, the government-controlled TV channel in India, on four successive Sundays at prime time.

He composed and performed music for Trikal by Shyam Benegal. In April 1986, he composed and performed the title song for the movie Jalwa, which was released in 1987. This 15-minute song made him instantly famous due to the popularity of Bollywood cinema and of the Hindi language.

He played music on the streets during the Konkani language agitation of 1986, spreading a message of peace to the violent protestors.

When invited to attend international music festivals and concerts, Remo again started travelling around the world. His first international event was at the 1986 Dresden International Song Competition in former East Germany. There he won three awards, the Press Critics Award, the Audience Favorite Award, and the overall Second Prize. He once represented India, when it was invited, in the Tokyo Music Festival. He also took part in the MIDEM '96 Music Festival in Hong Kong, Festival of India in the USSR, besides Festivals in Macau, Germany, Seychelles, Bulgaria and Mauritius.

During a 1987 trip to Kolkata, Remo visited Mother Teresa as he was stuck for a day in the city. She managed to influence him deeply and he wrote the songs "Take Me to Calcutta" and "Welcome My Child" on the flight back home. He had initially planned to release an album dedicated to her in 1990, with the tentative title of That Lady in Calcutta. However, these plans never came to fruition till 2019.

The next album he released in 1992 with Magnasound was titled Politicians Don't Know to Rock'n'Roll. Released in the backdrop of communal violence spreading in India, events such as the assassination of Rajiv Gandhi and the destruction of the Babri Masjid mosque in Ayodhya, the album expressed the political tension of the time. It included songs such as "Don't kick up the Rao", about the then Prime Minister P. V. Narasimha Rao, along with a song for India, "How does it feel?" and a song about safe sex titled "Everybody wants to".

=== 1995–2000: Playback singing, advertisements and collaborations ===
In 1995, Remo finally moved into Hindi pop and film music to become a playback singer, by teaming up with the director Mani Ratnam and composer A. R. Rahman. He sang the song "Humma Humma" in the Hindi dubbed of Tamil film Bombay. The song went on to earn Remo a Double Platinum. "Huiya Ho" was the next hit he composed for the film Khamoshi: The Musical which was released in 1996.

"The Flute Song"
Remo's now very famous Flute Kick, also informally called "the flute song".

"A Konkani song"
The song talks about Konkani being our mother tongue.

In 1995, during the Channel V Music Awards, Remo, on a bass guitar, and Queen's Roger Taylor on drums, played with Led Zeppelin band members, Jimmy Page and Robert Plant.

When Pepsi entered Indian markets in the 1990s as Leher Pepsi, they signed Remo for an endorsement deal and got him to star in their first two launch ad films. He also advertised for Raymonds.

In 1998, Remo launched an Indi-Pop music album titled "O, Meri Munni", whose title track of the same name, along with other songs became a chartbuster in the late 90s and early 2000s

In February 2005, Remo collaborated with Jethro Tull along with renowned Indian percussionist Sivamani for a concert held in Dubai. They performed tracks such as "Mother Goose", "Locomotive Breath", and Remo's now very famous Flute Kick also informally called "the flute song". Jethro Tull also backed Remo as he sang his own "Bombay City" and "Maria Pita Che".

Remo has long participated in and promoted a local festival called the Siolim Zagor.

=== 2001–2009: Microwave Papadums accident, its impact, reunion concert and subsequent projects ===
In 2001, three Microwave Papadums band members, Dharamedra Hirve, Selwyn Pereira and Victor Alvares, along with Remo's personal assistant Sunil Redkar, were killed in a road accident in Kanpur after a concert there. Remo was devastated and stayed away from music and performances for a year.

In 2002, Remo released two albums, Symphonic Chants and India Beyond. Tracks from India Beyond were signed to and released by Buddha Bar, Paris, France, and Opium Garden, Miami, USA. In India these albums went unnoticed.

In 2003, on his 50th birthday, Remo held a reunion concert in Goa with many of his former bands; The Beat 4, Indiana, and The Savages, besides friends like The Valadares Sisters and Lucio Miranda. It was a 4-hour concert attended by 25,000 people.

In 2007, Remo released the album Muchacha Latina. For the title song he scripted, directed and edited the music video himself.

In January the same year, he was conferred the Padma Shri by the Indian government. He refused an award conferred by the Goa government's Department of Art and Culture later that year. He was then awarded the Karamveer Puraskar by a group of Delhi-based NGOs later that year for the social messages and the impact of his works.

=== 2010–2014: Music close to his heart and political career ===
From then on, Remo made songs which were closest to his heart right from the start: socio-political comments and critiques, exposing corruption, communalism and other evils in India, and motivating people against them. He distributed these songs on the Internet for free, together with their music videos. Once again, they were scripted, directed and edited by him. The most memorable of these are "India, I Cry" (2009), "India Against Corruption" (in support of the 2011 Anna Hazare movement of the same name), and "Vote: Tit for Tat".

In 2011, Remo was approached by the Election Commission of India to be their 'Youth Icon for Ethical Voting' in Goa. "Vote: Tit for Tat" was composed to encourage the Goans to vote out corrupt ministers. Later that year, Remo sang a song for a new film, David, by Bejoy Nambiar (maker of the 2010 film Shaitan). This marked his return to Bollywood playback singing.

Remo was later seen working on three personal albums, one of them being a re-recording of his very first Goan Crazy!, in 2013. He later gave his tunes and voice to the title track of Luv U Soniyo which released on 26 July 2013.

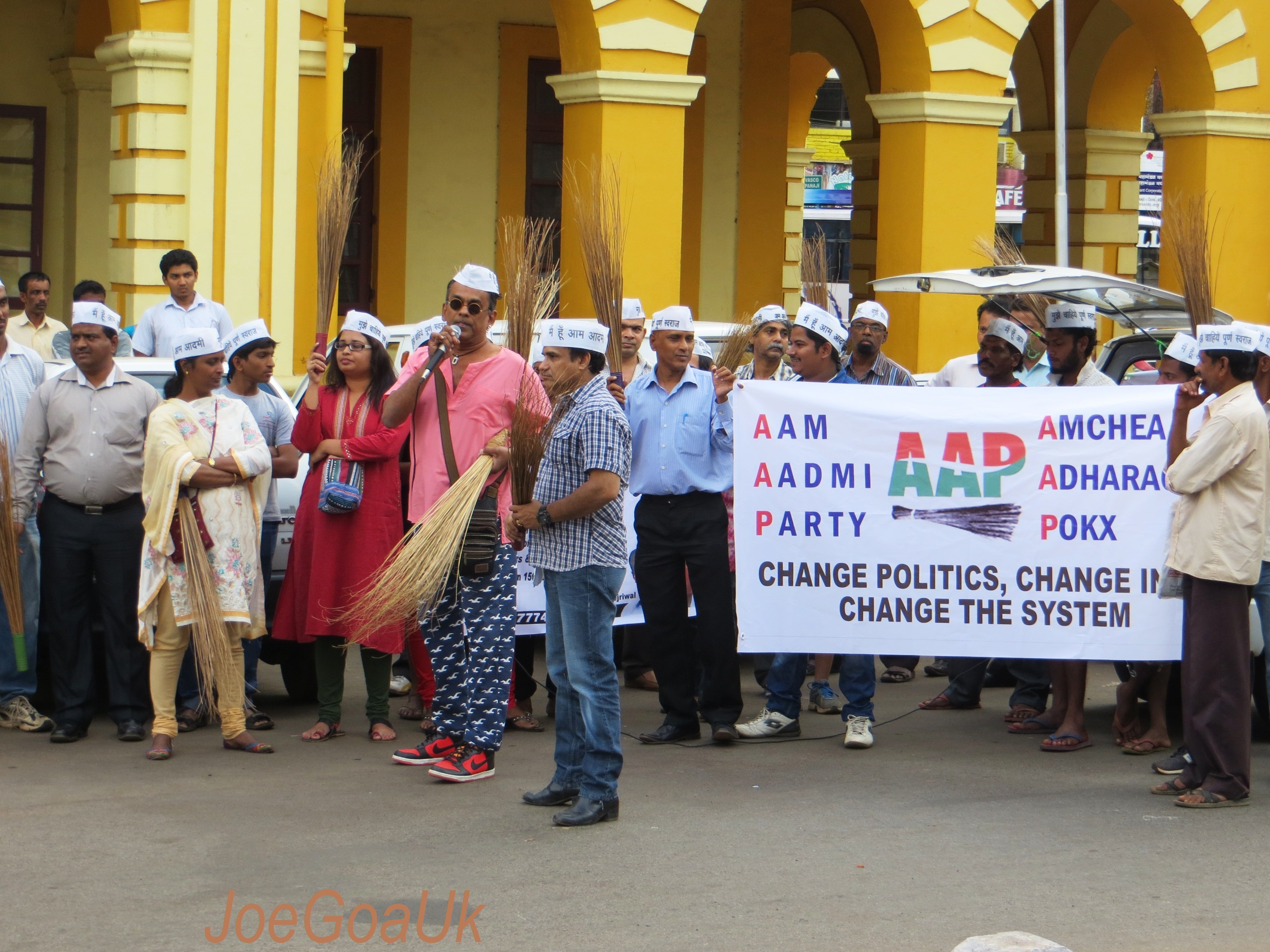
Fernandes (centre) seen at a protest of Aam Aadmi Party

In December 2013, he signed up as a member of Aam Aadmi Party, a political party, for Goa constituency. He wrote a jingle for their campaign for the 2014 Indian general election, but announced that he had left politics by March 2014.

=== 2015–Present: Acting debut, move to Portugal, second marriage and autobiography & final live performance ===
Fernandes appeared in the 2015 Anurag Kashyap film Bombay Velvet as a Portuguese nobleman, marking his debut in acting. While he had previously appeared in films (singing his own songs), this was his first speaking role.

In 2015, the investigation in a dismissed court case revealed that Fernendes had been a Portuguese citizen for a long time, possibly even when he was awarded the Padma Shri.

By 2016, Fernandes had resettled to Portugal. In 2019, he began working on his memoirs and on a concept album, Teresa and the Slum Bum, reminiscing his time spent with Mother Teresa in 1987. An opera featuring 26 songs and two instrumental pieces, it presents pro bono works by 35 singers from Europe, USA and India. Fernandes has played all instruments himself. Fleur Anne Dias is one singer who will be crooning in a song dedicated to Mother Teresa. Remo plans to crowdfund to cover the expenses of producing the album. The album was initially slated for a 2020 release with the tentative title of That Lady in Calcutta.

In 2018, Fernandes married Zenia Pereira.

In 2022, he released his autobiography, titled, Remo.

In August 2026, Remo played his final live performance in the UK. He claimed his recent health issues prevent him form giving his all at live shows and has decided to quit as a result.

== Discography ==
=== Studio albums ===
- Ode to the Messiah (with The Savages, 1975)
- Rock Synergie (Paris, 1980)
- Venus and the Moon (Netherlands, 1981)
- Goan Crazy! (1984)
- Old Goan Gold (1985)
- Pack That Smack (1986)
- Bombay City (1987)
- Politicians Don't Know to Rock'n'Roll (1992)
- O, Meri Munni (with his band Microwave Papadums, 1998)
- Symphonic Chants (2002)
- India Beyond (2002)
- Muchacha Latina (2007)
- Teresa and the Slum Bum (2019)

=== Singles ===
- "Flute Kick (The Flute Song)"
- "Hello Rajiv Gandhi"
- "Ode to Graham Bell"
- "Take Me to Calcutta"
- "Welcome My Child"
- "Bombay City"
- "Maria Pita Che"
- "India, I Cry"
- "Cyber Viber"
- "India Against Corruption"
- "Vote: Tit for Tat"

=== Soundtracks ===
Year	Film	Songs	Notes
1985	Trikal (Past, Present Future)		
1987	Jalwa	"Iss Jadu Ke Dande Main" "Teda Meda Main" "Dekho Dekho Yeh Hai Jalwa"	
1995	Bombay	"Humma Humma"	
1995	Ghatothkachudu	"Priya Madhuram"	Telugu
1996	Beqabu	"Lenga Lenga Lenga"	
1996	Sapoot	"Mumbai Liyo"	
1996	Khamoshi: The Musical	"Shinga-Linga" "Huiya Ho"	
1997	Daud	"Daud"	
1997	Aflatoon	"Aflatoon - Aflatoon"	
1998	Pyar To Hona Hi Tha	"Pyar To Hona Hi Tha"	
1999	Sangharsh	"Manzil Na Ho"	
2001	Ittefaq	"Bom Mat Mar	
2002	Aankhen	"Title Song"	
2010	Brindavanam	"Yuvakula"	Telugu
2013	David	"Maria Pitache" "Light House Symphony" (instrumental)	
2013	Luv U Soniyo	"Luv U Soniyo"	

== Filmography ==
Year	Title	Role	Notes
2014	Ek Villain	Caesar (Guru's boss and a crime lord)	
2015	Bombay Velvet	A Portuguese man	
2021	99 Songs		

== Awards ==
- Press Critics Award, Audience Favorite Award, and overall Second Prize at Dresden International Song Competition. (1986)
- Padma Shri by Indian Government. (2007)
- Karmaveer Puraskaar by Delhi-based NGOs. (2007)
