= Bejoy Nambiar =

Indian filmmaker (born 1979)

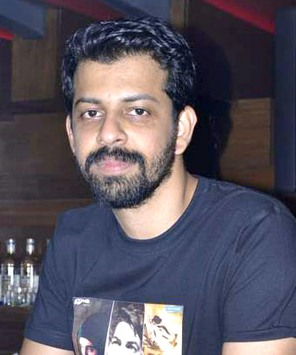
- Bejoy Nambiar in January 2013
- Born: 12 April 1979 (age 47); Mumbai, Maharashtra, India
- Occupations: Director; screenwriter
- Spouses: Juhi Babbar (m. 2007; div. 2009) Sheetal Menon (m. 2015)

Bejoy Nambiar (born 12 April 1979) is an Indian film director, and screenwriter known for his work in Hindi films. He is mostly known for his critically acclaimed short films, Rahu and Reflections, starring Mohanlal. He was the winner of Sony PIX Gateway to Hollywood, as the best director judged by Ashok Amritraj, Rajat Kapoor and Anurag Basu. He marked his feature film debut with the thriller Shaitan (2011). His second feature film was the anthology-drama film David, produced in Hindi and Tamil. His latest film was Taish (2020) was released on ZEE5. He also directed Wazir (2016), starring Amitabh Bachchan and Farhan Akhtar, and a short video 'Sachinocalypse' for All India Bakchod.

== Personal life ==
His mother tongue is Malayalam. Nambiar was married to Juhi Babbar on 27 June 2007, after a two-year courtship; the couple divorced in January 2009. He then married his long-time girlfriend Sheetal Menon in a traditional Malayali wedding in Kerala on 27 December 2015.

== Filmography ==
Key
†	Denotes films that have not yet been released

=== As film director ===
Year	Title	Language	Notes	Ref.
2005	Reflections	Silent	Short film; also producer	
2011	Shaitan	Hindi		
2013	David	Hindi	Also producer	
2013	David	Tamil	Also producer; partially dubbed from Hindi	
2016	Wazir	Hindi		
2017	Solo	Malayalam; Tamil	Also producer	
2020	Taish	Hindi	Also producer; released on ZEE5	
2024	Dange	Hindi		
2024	Por	Tamil		
2026	Tu Yaa Main	Hindi		

=== Other crew positions ===
Year	Title	Producer	Writer	Language	Notes	Ref.
2014	Kuku Mathur Ki Jhand Ho Gayi	Yes		Hindi		
2014	Pizza	Yes		Hindi		
2018	Karwaan		Yes	Hindi		

=== Television ===
Year	Title	Creator	Director	Writer	Producer	Language	Notes
2019	Flip	Yes	Yes	Yes	Yes	Hindi	
2021	Navarasa		Yes	Yes	Yes	Tamil	Anthology; Episode: "Edhiri"
2022	The Fame Game		Yes			Hindi	
2023	Sweet Kaaram Coffee		Yes			Tamil	Released on Amazon Prime
2023	Kaala	Yes	Yes	Yes	Yes	Hindi	8 episodes

== Awards and nominations ==
Year (Note: Refers to the year in which the ceremony was held.)	Award	Category	Film	Result	Ref.
2012	Producers Guild Film Awards	Best Screenplay (Note: Shared with Megha Ramaswamy.)	Shaitan	Nominated	
2012	Screen Awards	Best Director	Shaitan	Nominated	
2012	Screen Awards	Most Promising Debut Director	Shaitan	Won	
2012	Screen Awards	Best Screenplay	Shaitan	Nominated	
2012	Stardust Awards	Best Director	Shaitan	Nominated	
