= Gateway to Hollywood =

American old-time radio talent show

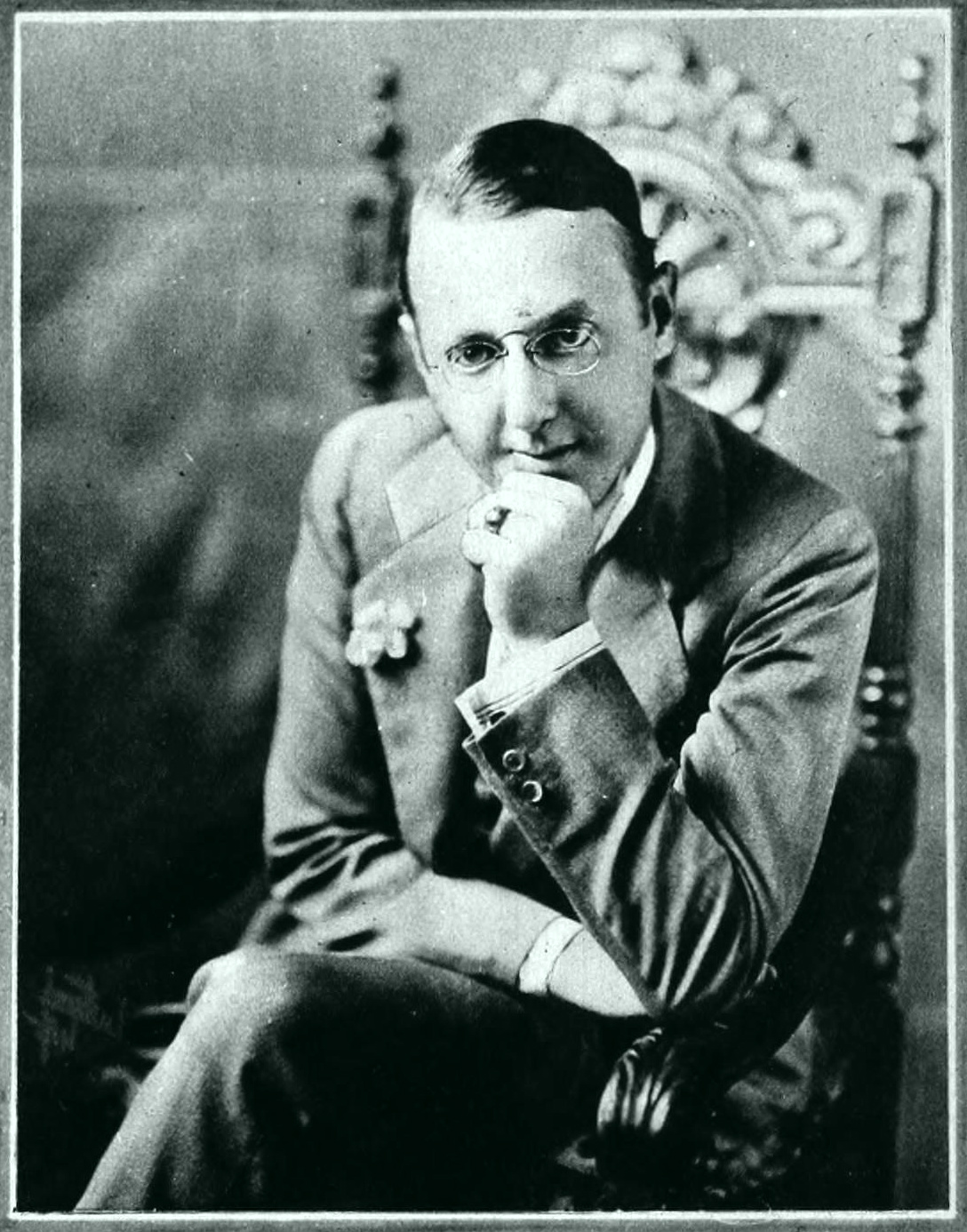
- Jesse L. Lasky, host of Gateway to Hollywood
- Genre: Talent show
- Country of origin: United States
- Language(s): English
- Syndicates: CBS
- Hosted by: Jesse L. Lasky
- Announcer: Ken Niles; Cliff Howell; Gary Breckner
- Written by: Ray Wilson
- Directed by: Charles Vanda; Jesse L. Lasky
- Produced by: Bobby Brown
- Original release: January 8 – December 31, 1939
- Sponsored by: Wrigley's gum

Gateway to Hollywood is an American old-time radio talent show. It was broadcast on CBS from January 8, 1939, to December 31, 1939. Like other programs from Major Bowes Amateur Hour to American Idol, the show sought to turn relatively unknown people into celebrities. The same title was used by an unrelated program that was broadcast on the Don Lee Network in the mid-1930s.

== Format ==
Cities across the United States were sites for auditions for people who wanted to appear on Gateway to Hollywood. Contestants auditioned in teams of one male and one female, with the ultimate winning team receiving a screen test from RKO Pictures. In addition to the screen test, each member of the winning couple received membership in the Screen Actors Guild and screen names that they would use in their acting careers. Judges were five people from RKO, with criteria for selection being "photographic potential, personality, and dramatic ability." Wrigley's gum was the sponsor.

Contestant teams that survived early elimination and appeared on the program performed a playlet with a well-known star. Each round of competition involved 13 teams and lasted 13 weeks,

== Personnel ==
Film producer Jesse L. Lasky was the host of Gateway to Hollywood. Ken Niles was the chief announcer and talent coach. Assistant announcers were Cliff Howell and Gary Breckner. Charles Vanda was the initial director, with Lasky taking over that role when the series resumed in the fall of 1939. Ray Wilson was the head writer. Bobby Brown was the producer. Wilbur Hatch and Carl Hohengarten provided the music.

Edward Arnold, Joan Bennett, and Miriam Hopkins were guests on the premiere episode, appearing in dramatic sketches with the contestants.

== Selected participants ==
=== Winners ===
- Ralph Bowman received a contract with RKO and the screen name John Archer.
- Josephine Cottle became actress Gale Storm. She later married her Gateway to Hollywood teammate, Lee Bonnell, who took the screen name Terry Belmont.

=== Non-winners ===
- Kathryn Adams
- Hugh Beaumont
- Linda Darnell
- Linda Hayes

== Don Lee Network program ==
Beginning in 1936, the Don Lee Network broadcast a program titled Gateway to Hollywood on the West Coast. It used an amateur-hour format but featured "tried and experienced professional entertainers" who hoped the exposure would give them an opportunity to get into film, radio, or other fields of entertainment. Approximately a dozen acts competed on each broadcast; members of the audience selected each winner with votes submitted via telephone and mail.
