= Kanimozhi (soundtrack) =

Soundtrack album by Satish Chakravarthy
- Released: 18 August 2010
- Recorded: 2010
- Genre: Film soundtrack
- Length: 21:01
- Language: Tamil
- Label: Think Music
- Producer: Satish Chakravarthy

Satish Chakravarthy chronology
Leelai (2009)	Kanimozhi (2010)	Yasakhan (2013)

Kanimozhi is the soundtrack album to the 2010 film of the same name directed by Sripathy Rangasamy in his directorial debut and produced by T. Siva and Sona Heiden. The soundtrack featured five songs composed by Satish Chakravarthy and written by Na. Muthukumar and Pa. Vijay. The album was released at a high-profile function in Chennai on 18 August 2010, with the cast and crew and other film personalities and felicitated by the then-Chief Minister of Tamil Nadu M. Karunanidhi. Think Music distributed the film's soundtrack.

== Background ==
The soundtrack and background score were composed by Satish Chakravarthy. T. Siva and Sripathy listened to Satish's compositions for Leelai and felt impressed by it. Sripathy then narrated the script to Kanimozhi and felt that "the story was unique and would offer me great scope to come up with good melodies and a meaningful background score." He then signed the project after ten minutes of meeting the producer and director. He composed the tunes in early 2010 and performed it at the film's launch.

Satish added that he was impressed with Sripathi's confidence in making silence eloquent in the score, as a result, "the music becomes a character in the film". The producers emphasized on live sound recording over dubbing, resulted in Satish emphasizing on background music. The music and background score was recorded and mixed at Yashraj Studios in Mumbai and audiographed by Anandar Chandrahasan, while mastering was held at the Sterling Sound in Los Angeles. The song "Muzhumadhi" was recorded at the AVM Studios in Mumbai during the last leg of production.

== Release ==
Kanimozhi was Satish's first soundtrack to be released as his previous album Leelai was delayed. The album was released on 18 August 2010 at Kalaignar Arangam in Anna Arivalayam, Teynampet, Chennai. The event was felicitated by the then-Chief Minister of Tamil Nadu M. Karunanidhi and actor Vijay as the chief guest, along with director K. Balachander, actors Prakash Raj, R. Parthiban, producer M. Saravanan, former Tamil Film Producers Council president Rama Narayanan in attendance besides the cast and crew. However, former MP M. K. Kanimozhi (on whose name the film was titled) did not attend the event as she was in Delhi during that time. Karunanidhi and Vijay received the first copy of the soundtrack. An animated trailer and three songs were screened at the event. The music of the Telugu version Love Journey was released at a Celebrity Cricket League match in Visakhapatnam. All the songs from the original version were retained with different singers for the Telugu version, while lyrics were written by Vennelakanti and Bhuvanachandra.

== Track list ==
=== Tamil ===
No.	Title	Lyrics	Singer(s)	Length
1.	"Penne Pogathey"	Pa. Vijay	Clinton Cerejo, Sam Keerthan, Timothy Madhukar, Sunitha Sarathy	4:34
2.	"Muzhumadhi"	Na. Muthukumar	Vijay Yesudas, Bela Shende	3:51
3.	"Yaaro Ival Ival"	Na. Muthukumar	Mukesh Mohamed, Bela Shende, Parthiv Gohil	3:58
4.	"Thada Thada Endru"	Na. Muthukumar	Clinton Cerejo, Satish Chakravarthy, Leon James	4:47
5.	"Muzhumadhi" (Instrumental)	—	Satish Chakravarthy, Nathan	3:51

=== Telugu ===
No.	Title	Lyrics	Singer(s)	Length
1.	"Punnami Punnami"	Vennelakanti	Vijay Yesudas, Swetha Mohan	3:51
2.	"Evaro Ee Cheli"	Vennelakanti	Mukesh Mohamed, Niveditha	3:58
3.	"Dhada Dhada"	Bhuvanachandra	Satish Chakravarathy	4:47
4.	"Manasey Poyindhey"	Vennelakanti	Christopher Stanley	4:34
5.	"Punnami Punnami" (Instrumental)	—	Satish Chakravarthy, Nathan	3:51

== Reception ==
Karthik Srinivasan of Milliblog wrote "Composer Satish Chakravarthy's debut, Leelai, was average. He ups the stake, albeit very mildly, with his second, Kanimozhi." Karthik Subramanian of The Hindu wrote "The music by Sathish Chakravarthy though is above par — especially the song 'Muzhumathi' sung by Vijay Yesudas and Bal Shende, and written by Na. Muthukumar." Pavithra Srinivasan of Rediff.com added "Sathish Chakravarthi's music fits the bill". Sify stated: "Music by Sathish Chakravarthy are just about ok but come as speed breakers." The New Indian Express wrote "Satish Chakaravarthy makes a promising debut as a music composer. His tunes are varied and peppy in this film."
