= Sweet Talk =

Sweet Talk may refer to:

== Books ==
- Sweet Talk, novel by Julie Garwood
- Sweet Talk, novel by Susan Mallery 2008
- Sweet Talk, novel by Hank Janson 1965
- Sweet Talk, 1973 play by Michael Abbensetts
- Sweet Talk, 1995 play by Peter Lefcourt, adapted for 2013 film

== Film and TV ==
- Sweet Talk, 2013 film directed by Terri Hanauer with Karen Austin, John Glover

== Music ==
=== Albums ===
- Sweet Talk, album by Robin Beck, 1979
- Sweet Talk, album by the Manhattans, 1989
- Sweet Talk, album by Reneé Austin, 2003
- Sweet Talk, album by Eric Marienthal, 2005
- Sweet Talk and Good Lies, album by Heather Myles, 2002

=== Songs ===
- "Sweet Talk", single by Bobby Comstock, written Doc Pomus and Mort Shuman, 1959
- "Sweet Talk", single by Boots Randolph, also by the Play Boys, written by Dick Reynolds (musician)
- "Sweet Talk", single by Lainie Kazan, written by Cy Coleman and Floyd Huddleston, 1966
- "Sweet Talk", single by Girl Skwadd, 1979, Steve O'Donnell (musician)
- "Sweet Talk", single by D'Atra Hicks, 1989, No. 8 US R&B
- "Sweet Talk", single by Hipsway, 1989
- "Sweet Talk", single by Faye Adams, 1953
- "Sweet Talk", single by Priscilla Mitchell, 1966
- "Sweet Talk", song from The Victors (film), 1963
- "Sweet Talk", debut single by Robin Beck, 1979
- "Sweet Talk", song by the Killers from Sawdust, 2007
- "Sweet Talk" (Samantha Jade song), 2014, No. 38 in Australia
- "Sweet Talk", song by Peggy Lee from Let's Love (album), 1974
- "Sweet Talk", song by Sheena Easton from album Best Kept Secret, 1983
- "Sweet Talk", song by Uriah Heep Head First
- "Sweet Talk", song by Amii Stewart from Love Affair (album), 1996
- "Sweet Talk", song by Jessie Ware from Devotion
- "Sweet Talk", song by Spank Rock from YoYoYoYoYo 2006
- "Sweet Talk", song by English rock band Spiritualized from Songs in A&E 2008
- "Sweet Talk", single by Lee Aaron 1990
- "Sweet Talk", remix of "Mr. Brightside" by Stuart Price
- "Sweet Talk", song by Dear and the Headlights from Small Steps, Heavy Hooves
- "Sweet Talk", song by Cymande Arrival (Cymande album)
- "Sweet Talk", song by Isac Elliot from Wake Up World (album) 2013
- "Sweet Talk", song by Aidan from This Is Aidan, 2023
- "Sweet Talk", song by Saint Motel from Sainmotelevision
- "Sweet Talk", instrumental by Paul Bley from Modern Chant
- "Sweet Talk", Korean-language song by Girls' Generation from Holiday Night

== See also ==
- Sweet Talker (disambiguation)
- Kanimozhi (disambiguation) (lit. 'Sweet Talk' in Tamil)
