= Shiv Panditt =

Indian actor

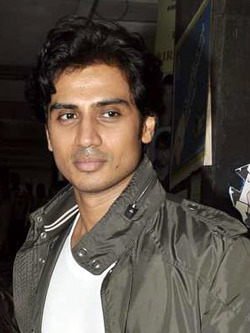
- Panditt promoting Shaitan in 2011
- Born: 21 June 1984 (age 42); Nagpur, Maharashtra, India
- Education: The Doon School, Dehradun; Hindu College, Delhi
- Occupations: Actor, model, emcee, television host, radio jockey
- Years active: 2003–present
- Spouse: Ameira Punvani (m. 2018)

Shiv Pandit (born 21 June 1984), known professionally as Shiv Panditt, is an Indian actor, model, emcee, radio jockey and television host who works in Hindi, English, and Tamil cinema and television.

He is the brother of Gayatri Pandit, who has been an assistant director on the films Desi Boyz (2011), Boss (2013), Roy (2015), Shivaay (2016), Om The Battle Within (2021) and Arjun Pandit, an ex sports anchor on NDTV and STAR Sports.

== Education ==
Shiv Pandit did his primary schooling from Hillgrange Preparatory School in Dehradun, and grade seven onwards, from the The Doon School in Dehradun, and then went to Hindu College, University of Delhi, for graduation.

== Career ==
=== Films ===
Shiv Panditt made his screen debut in 2011 with the critically and commercially successful Hindi film Shaitan where he got noticed and was nominated for the Filmfare Award for Best Male Debut. He went on to debut as a lead actor in the Tamil film Leelai. The film opened to positive reviews, with Panditt's performance being well received by both critics and audience alike.

=== Television ===
After having featured in several T.V. commercials for popular brands (Sprite, Airtel, Tide, Colgate, LG & Rotomac to name a few), Panditt landed the lead role in the sitcom FIR in 2006. Post his stint on the show, he was contracted as the host for the 1st edition of the Indian Premier League on Set MAX for the show 'Extraaa Innings T20' in 2008.

== Personal life ==
He married costume designer Ameira Punvani in a private ceremony in New Delhi on 18 April 2018.

== Filmography ==
=== Feature films ===
Year	Film	Role	Language	Notes
2004	Let's Enjoy	Raghu Pandit	English; Hindi	
2009	Aagey Se Right	Sunny	Hindi	
2011	Shaitan	Dushyant Sahu/ Dash	Hindi	Nominated for Filmfare Award for Best Male Debut; Nominated for Big Star Young Entertainer Debut of the Year – Male; Nominated for Screen Award – Best Ensemble Cast
2012	Leelai	Karthik	Tamil	
2013	Boss	Shiv Shastri	Hindi	
2014	Mumbai Delhi Mumbai	Goli Kohli	Hindi	
2016	7 Hours To Go	Arjun Ranawat	Hindi	
2017	Mantra	Viraj Kapoor	English; Hindi	Special appearance
2017	Loev	Jai	English	
2020	Khuda Haafiz	Faiz Abu Malik	Hindi	
2021	Shershaah	Captain Sanjeev Jamwal	Hindi	
2022	Laal Singh Chaddha	Captain Sandeep	Hindi	
2025	Nesippaya	Monty	Tamil	
2026	Sigma	Vincent	Tamil	

=== Short films ===
Year	Film	Role	Language	Notes
2008	The Private Life of Albert Pinto	Albert Pinto	English	
2010	The Other Woman	Karan	English	
2016	Charlie@Midnight	Monty	Hindi	
2017	Jai Mata Di	Suraj Shetty	Hindi	
2017	Bulbul	Aditya	Hindi	
2018	Every Goa Plan Ever - Narcos: Mexico Edition	Rahul	English	
2019	Joyride	Raunak	Hindi	
2019	Musafir	Zulfiqar Ali Baig	Hindi	
2020	Koi Hai	Ashish	Hindi	

=== Television ===
Year	Show	Role	Language	Notes
2004	Page 3	Host	Hindi	
2004–2005	Studio Disney	Host	Hindi	
2005–2006	Bombay Talking	Kunal Khosla	English	
2006–2008	FIR	Chief Inspector Hanuman Prasad Pandey	Hindi	Nominated for Boroplus Gold Awards 2008 (Dubai) – Best Comic Role (Male)
2008	Extraaa Innings T20	Host	English	
2009	Jhalak Dikhhla Jaa (Season 3)	Host	Hindi	
2010	Rishta.com	Neeraj	Hindi	
2016	Dr. Bhanumati On Duty	Inspector Makkhan Singh/ Shiv	Hindi	Guest appearance

=== Web series ===
Year	Show	Role	Language	Notes
2017	Untag	Prithvi Sihaag	Hinglish	
2018	Selection Day	Lord Subramanyam	Hinglish	
2019	Love Lust & Confusion - Season 2	Abir Sen	Hinglish	
2020	The Chargesheet: Innocent or Guilty?	Shiraz Malik	Hindi	
2021	Chakravyuh – An Inspector Virkar Crime Thriller	Roy	Hinglish	
2023	Bambai Meri Jaan	Inspector Ranbir Malik	Hindi	
2025	Search: The Naina Murder Case	Tushar Surve	Hindi	

=== Music videos ===
Year	Song	Artist	Language	Awards	Label
2003	Tera Mera Pyaar Ho Gaya (Remix)	Dj Amit	Hindi		Times Music
2018	Heeriye	Nakash Aziz	Hindi		Indie Music Label
2024	Paon Ki Jutti	Jyoti Nooran	Hindi		

== Recognition ==
Panditt was ranked 3rd in Times of India's (Itimes.com) 'Most Promising Newcomer' in 2011. In March 2018, he was invited as a guest speaker for the TEDx event held in NMIMS, Shirpur to speak about his journey as an actor.
