= Kanimozhi (disambiguation) =

Kanimozhi is an Indian politician, poet and journalist.

Kanimozhi (lit. 'Sweet language') may also refer to:

- Kanimozhi (film), 2010 Indian Tamil-language film
  - Kanimozhi (soundtrack), of the film by Satish Chakravarthy
- Kanimozhi N. V. N. Somu, an Indian politician
- Kanimozhi Santhosh, an Indian politician
