= Ulajh =

2024 Indian film by Sudhanshu Saria

- Theatrical release poster
- Directed by: Sudhanshu Saria
- Written by: Parveez Shaikh; Sudhanshu Saria
- Dialogues by: Atika Chohan
- Produced by: Vineet Jain
- Starring: Janhvi Kapoor; Roshan Mathew; Gulshan Devaiah; Adil Hussain
- Cinematography: Shreya Dev Dube
- Edited by: Nitin Baid
- Music by: Shashwat Sachdev
- Production company: Junglee Pictures
- Distributed by: Pen Marudhar Entertainment
- Release date: 2 August 2024
- Running time: 134 minutes
- Country: India
- Language: Hindi
- Budget: ₹35 crore
- Box office: est. ₹11.05 crore

Ulajh (transl. Entangle) is a 2024 Indian Hindi-language spy thriller film directed by Sudhanshu Saria and produced by Junglee Pictures. It stars Janhvi Kapoor, Roshan Mathew, Gulshan Devaiah and Adil Hussain. The plot focuses on a young IFS officer with a legacy of patriots in her family, entangled in a dangerous personal conspiracy amidst a career-defining post far away from her home.

The film was announced in May 2023 and was shot in India and London, with principal photography beginning in June 2023 and ending by September 2023. Ulajh was released on 2 August 2024 to mixed reviews from critics. The film became a box office bomb, grossing only ₹11 crore worldwide.

== Plot ==
Suhana Bhatia is an IFS officer, belonging to an illustrious family of diplomats. Her father is about to be made the Permanent Representative of India to the United Nations, and she is promoted to the role of Deputy commissioner at the Indian High Commission in the United Kingdom. Suhana moves to London, where she is chauffeured around by her driver and ex-policeman, Salim.

India is preparing to receive the newly-elected Prime minister of Pakistan, Shahzad Alam, who has announced a pro-India policy. Manohar Rawal, an Indian cabinet minister, invites Alam to participate in India's Independence Day ceremony, after Alam agreed to extradite a wanted terrorist, Yaseen Mirza. Meanwhile in London, Suhana meets an ex-Michelin-star chef, Nakul, at a DHC event. They start going out, and eventually sleep together in her apartment. Unknown to Suhana, Nakul secretly records their encounter and begins to blackmail her the next day. He demands confidential information about a new energy deal. Fearful of the fallout a scandal will have on her father and family's reputation, Suhana complies.

When Nakul continues to blackmail Suhana with more demands, she considers resigning from her post. However, Nakul claims to be ISI agent Akhtar, potentially complicating matters as Suhana will now be held liable for treason. She continues to comply, but her actions have alerted RAW agent, Jacob, who works at the DHC. He confronts Suhana but is shot dead by Akhtar. Senior RAW executives, Bajpai and Kamat, task Suhana with heading the investigation into his death, unaware that Suhana was a witness.

Suhana finds Akhtar is colluding with Salim. She confronts Salim at his apartment, but he dies after she pushes him through a glass door. RAW agent, Sebin, who also works at the DHC, shows up at the scene. He initially blames Suhana, due to being angered by his friend Jacob's death, but she is able to show him proof of being blackmailed by Akhtar, with Salim being involved in a larger conspiracy. The two decide to work together. Following clues, they uncover that Rawal and Kamat are involved in a large-scale plot, eventually culminating in the assassination of Alam on his visit to India. The attempt will be carried out by David, a French Canadian assassin, who has been posing as Nakul/Akhtar.

Suhana and Sebin reach India to stop the assassination attempt. From RAW agents, they receive Alam's schedule in Delhi, and covertly reach the dargah where he will be assassinated. Suhana tracks David to a tower in the vicinity, and confronts him before he can take his shot. David is killed by Suhana and the conspiracy unravels. Kamat and Rawal are arrested, and Suhana is congratulated for her role in preventing a major international incident. She is approached by a member of a secret elite intelligence unit, the Black Cats, to join their team. As Suhana leaves the hospital, she mentions this to Sebin, who reveals he was a member all along.

== Cast ==
- Janhvi Kapoor as Suhana Bhatia
- Roshan Mathew as RAW agent Sebin Kutty
- Gulshan Devaiah as Nakul Sharma / ISI agent Akhtar / David
- Adil Hussain as Dhanraj Bhatia
- Meiyang Chang as Jacob Tamang
- Rajesh Tailang as Salim Sayeed
- Rajendra Gupta as Manohar Rawal
- Jitendra Joshi as Prakash Kamat
- Sakshi Tanwar as Roshni Sengupta
- Arun Mallik as Ambassador Khurana
- Amit Tiwari Anand as Deputy Counsel Solanki
- Priyanka Pal as The Scarred Woman
- Rushad Rana as Pakistan PM Shahzad Alam
- Himanshu Malik as Yaseen Mirza
- Bhavna Singh as Yaseen's Wife
- Vivek Madan as Pakistan Defence Minister
- Swati Verma as News Reporter
- Natasha Rastogi as Saroj Bhatia
- Swastika Chakraborty as Suhana's Bhua
- Alyy Khan as Ambassador Kazi

== Production ==
Principal photography commenced in June 2023 and wrapped in September 2023 in London.

== Music ==
Ulajh

Soundtrack album by Shashwat Sachdev
- Released: 29 July 2024
- Recorded: 2022–2023
- Genre: Feature film soundtrack
- Length: 21:47
- Language: Hindi
- Label: Sony Music India
- Producer: Shashwat Sachdev

Shashwat Sachdev chronology
Article 370 (2024)	Ulajh (2024)	Kesari Chapter 2 (2025)
External audio
- Ulajh - Audio Jukebox on YouTube

The soundtrack is composed by Shashwat Sachdev and lyrics is written by Kumaar, Jasmine Sandlas and Sudhanshu Saria.

Track listing
No.	Title	Lyrics	Singer(s)	Length
1.	"Shaukan"	Kumaar	Jubin Nautiyal, Neha Kakkar, Shashwat Sachdev	2:47
2.	"Aaja Oye"	Jasmine Sandlas, Sudhanshu Saria	Jasmine Sandlas, Shashwat Sachdev	2:37
3.	"Main Hoon Tera Ae Watan"	Kumaar	Shashwat Sachdev	4:15
4.	"Ilahi Mere Rubaroo"	Kumaar	Sanjith Hegde, Shahzad Ali, Shashwat Sachdev	5:16
5.	"Jao Ji Jao"	Sudhanshu Saria	Garvit Soni, Priyansh Srivastava, Shashwat Sachdev	3:59
6.	"Thoda Galat"	Kumaar	Jubin Nautiyal, Shashwat Sachdev	2:53
Total length:				21:47

== Release ==
=== Theatrical ===
Ulajh was scheduled to release on 5 July 2024 but was later postponed to 2 August 2024.

=== Home media ===
The film was premiered on Netflix from 27 September 2024.

== Reception ==
Ulajh was poorly received by critics. On the review aggregator website Rotten Tomatoes, 33% of 12 critics' reviews are positive, with an average rating of 5.8/10.

A critic of Bollywood Hungama rated the film 1.5/5 stars and noted "Ulajh is a niche and confusing film which is devoid of any entertainment value". Sreehari Nair of Rediff.com rated the film 1.5/5 and observed that "Ulajh strikes you as an attempt at statement-making gone horribly wrong, a punchline that doesn't land, a roar that never reaches the ear".

Tanmayi Savadi of Times Now gave the film a rating of 3.5/5 and wrote "Sudhanshu maintains a balance between Suhana’s vulnerabilities and the tightness of the script. Often thrillers get predictable after a point; Ulajh holds onto itself well". Filmfare gave the film a rating of 3.5/5 and wrote "A more nuanced writing would have served her better." Sreeparna Sengupta of The Times of India gave the film a rating of 3/5 and wrote "As a spy-thriller 'Ulajh' is gripping in parts and a tad flat in others".

Shubhra Gupta of The Indian Express rated the film 2/5 and wrote the film is a "damp squib, wastes fine ensemble cast on amateurish plot-line". Rating the film 2/5, Suparna Sharma of The Week wrote "It’s a joyless film about a daddy’s little girl who must somehow redeem herself at least in her father's eyes. On that count the film delivers. On all other counts, it fails." Mayank Shekhar of Mid-Day rated the film 1 1/2 and commented "Untangling this pretentious nonsense".

== See also ==
- Half Moon Street, a 1986 film with a similar premise
