= Vijay Yesudas =

Indian playback singer and actor (born 1979)

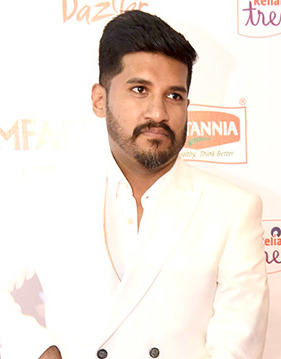
- Vijay Yesudas at the 62nd Britannia Filmfare South Awards

Background information
- Born: 23 March 1979 (age 47); Madras, Tamil Nadu, India
- Occupations: Playback singer; actor
- Years active: 1998–present
- Spouse: Darshana Balagopal (m. 2007; sep. 2024)
- Award: See below
- Musical career
- Genres: Filmi; Indian pop; Carnatic music
- Occupations: Playback singer; Actor; Composer
- Instrument: Vocals
- Labels: Tharangni; Sony Music India; Muzik 247

Vijay Yesudas (born 23 March 1979) is an Indian playback singer, actor, and composer. He has sung over 1000 film songs. Vijay works predominantly in the South Indian film industry, mostly in Malayalam, Telugu, Tamil, Kannada, and Hindi. He is the son of acclaimed singer K. J. Yesudas.

Vijay made his debut as a singer with the 2000 Malayalam film Millennium Stars, which had music composed by Vidyasagar. Vijay Yesudas won three Kerala State Film Awards for Best Singer for the songs "Kolakkuzhal Vili Ketto" in Nivedyam (2007), "Akaleyo Nee" in Grandmaster and "Mazhakondu Mathram" in Spirit (2012), and "Poomuthole" in Joseph (2018). He has also won five Filmfare Awards for Best Singer and four SIIMA Awards for Best Male Playback Singer. He made a foray into acting by playing the villain role in the Tamil film Maari (2015) and the lead role in the Tamil film Padaiveeran (2018).

== Early life ==
Vijay Yesudas was born to singer K. J. Yesudas and Prabha. He is the second son in the family, having an elder brother named Vinod and a younger one, Vishal. He is the grandson of stage singer Augustine Joseph. He studied in Chennai until 9th grade and went to the U.S. for further studies. He graduated from Florida International University with a BA in music.

== Career ==
Vijay Yesudas started learning Carnatic music in the early 1997. He is popular for songs sung under composer Yuvan Shankar Raja. He has collaborated with various other composers such as Dakshinamoorthy Swami, Ilaiyaraja, A. R. Rahman, Raveendran, Hamsalekha, Deva, Ouseppachan, Vidyasagar, Mani Sharma, M. M. Keeravani, and Mohan Sitara along with new-generation composers such as Karthik Raja, M. Jayachandran, Sabesh–Murali, Harris Jayaraj, G. V. Prakash Kumar, D. Imman, Srikanth Deva, and Deepak Dev.

Vijay made his playback debut in the 2000 Malayalam film Millennium Stars, on the composition of Vidyasagar. He won the Kerala State Film Award for Best Singer for "Kolakkuzhal Vili Ketto" in Nivedyam (2007). Vijay made his acting debut in the 2010 Malayalam film Avan. In 2013, he won his second Kerala State Film Award for Best Singer for "Akaleyo Nee" in Grandmaster and "Mazhakondu Mathram" in Spirit (2012). In 2015, Vijay sang "Malare" in the Malayalam film Premam, went viral among young audiences. The song was often shared soon after its video release, he also had another successful song, "Hemnathamen Kaikumbili" from Kohinoor. That year, he also acted as villain in the commercially successful Tamil film Maari. His performance received appreciation. He has sung 178 Malayalam songs and 118 Tamil songs.

== Personal life ==
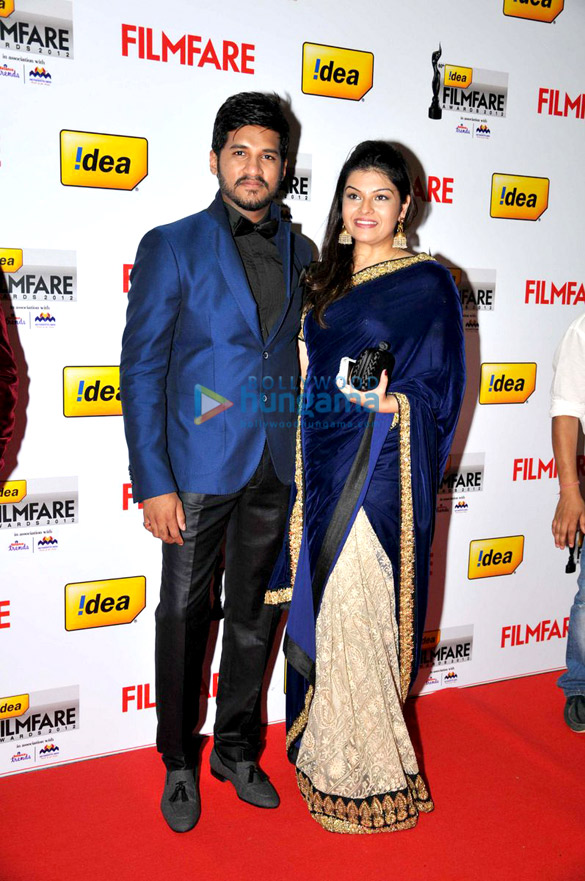
Vijay with wife Darshana in 2013

Vijay met his future wife Darshana at a music concert held in Dubai on 2002 Valentine's Day. After five years of dating, he married Darshana in 2007 at Thiruvananthapuram. They have a daughter, Ammeya, and a son, Avyan.

== Awards ==
Kerala State Film Awards:

- 2007– Best Singer – Nivedyam – "Kolakkuzhal Vili Ketto"
- 2012– Best Singer – Grandmaster – "Akaleyo Nee", Spirit – "Mazhakondu Mathram"
- 2018– Best Singer – Joseph – "Poomuthole"

Filmfare Awards South:

- 2011 – Filmfare Award for Best Male Playback Singer – Malayalam – Indian Rupee – "Ee Puzhayum"
- 2012 – Filmfare Award for Best Male Playback Singer – Malayalam – Spirit – "Mazhakondu Mathram"
- 2013 – Filmfare Award for Best Male Playback Singer – Malayalam – Memories – "Thirayum Theeravum"
- 2015 – Filmfare Award for Best Male Playback Singer – Malayalam – Premam – "Malare Ninne"
- 2018 - Filmfare Award for Best Male Playback Singer – Malayalam - Joseph – "Poomuthole"

IIFA Utsavam:

- 2016–1st IIFA Utsavam for playback singer male – Malayalam
- 2017–2nd IIFA Utsavam for playback singer male – Malayalam

Nandi Awards:

- 2014–Nandi Award for Best Male Playback Singer for the song "Nee Kanti Choopullo" from Legend

South Indian International Movie Awards:

- 2012–SIIMA Award for Best Male Playback Singer – ee Puzhayum
- 2013–SIIMA Award for Best Male Playback Singer – Mazha Kondu
- 2014 – SIIMA Award for Best Male Playback Singer – Thirayum Theeramum
- 2016–SIMA Award for Best Male Playback Singer – Malare

Asiavision Awards:

- 2011– Asiavision Awards – Best Male Singer
- 2013 – Asiavision Awards – Best Male Singer
- 2015 – Asiavision Awards – Best Male Singer

Asianet Film Awards:

- 2012 – Asianet Film Award – Best Male Singer
- 2013 – Asianet Film Award – Best Male Singer
- 2015– Asianet Film Award – Best Male Singer

Vanitha Film Awards:

- 2012 – Best singer male
- 2016 – Best singer male
- 2018 – Best singer male

Edison Awards (India):

- 2014-Best Male Playback singer

North American Film Awards:

- 2016-Best Male singer - Premam and Ennu Ninte Moideen
- 2018-Best Male singer

Anand TV awards:

- 2016-Best Male singer

CERA BIG Malayalam Music Awards:

- 2014 – CERA BIG Malayalam Music Awards – Best Male Singer

Mangalam Music awards

- 2017 – Best Playback Singer

Flowers Music awards

- 2018 – Best Playback Singer

== Discography ==
=== Telugu discography ===
Year	Film	Songs	Composer
2002	Neetho	"Pannendintiki"	Vidyasagar
2003	Abhimanyu	"Prapanchame"	Mani Sharma
2003	ShivaPutrudu	"Adigo Avineeti"	Ilaiyaraaja
2003	ShivaPutrudu	"Evaridi Evaridi"	Ilaiyaraaja
2003	ShivaPutrudu	"Okate Jananam"	Ilaiyaraaja
2003	Manasantha	"Teeyanidi Teeranidi"	Ilaiyaraaja
2003	Manasantha	"Nee Kalle"	Ilaiyaraaja
2003	Seetayya	"Samayaniki"	M. M. Keeravani
2004	Naa Autograph	"Nuvvante Pranamani"	M. M. Keeravani
2004	Dosth	"Nee Chupu"	Koti
2005	Abhimaani	"Ragam Theese" (Male)	Varikuppala Yadagiri
2005	Sivapuram	"Shashi Vadhanam"	M. G. Radhakrishnan
2006	Adavi Biddalu	"Gangamma Gundello"	R. Narayana Murthy
2006	Chilipi	"Tajmahalu"	Yuvan Shankar Raja
2006	Sri Ramadasu	"Allah"	M. M. Keeravani
2006	Sri Ramadasu	"Ye Teeruga"	M. M. Keeravani
2006	Shankar	"Manchu Muthyama"	Vandemataram Srinivas
2006	Tata Birla Madhyalo Laila	"Puvvai Pova Cheliya"	M. M. Srilekha
2006	E	"Naa Swasaga"	Srikanth Deva
2007	Maharadhi	"Veeche Gaalulalo"	Gurukiran
2007	Dubai Seenu	"Kanya Raasi"	Mani Sharma
2007	Anumanaspadam	"Ninu Vethiki Vethiki"	Ilaiyaraaja
2007	Sunny	"Ningilo Neelima"	Ilaiyaraaja
2007	Sivaji: The Boss	"Sahara"	A. R. Rahman
2007	Sandhya	"Inkonchem"	Ganesh Chakravarthy
2007	Chandrahas	"Hridaya Madhuvanilo"	M. M. Keeravani
2008	Badhradri	"Gorinka"	Mani Sharma
2008	Okka Magaadu	"Devadhi Deva"	Mani Sharma
2008	Aalayam	"Gudilo Challani"	Koti
2008	Mallepuvvu	"Chirugali"	Ilaiyaraaja
2008	Bheema	"Rangu Rangamma"	Harris Jayaraj
2008	Pandurangadu	"Prema Valambanam"	M. M. Keeravani
2008	Maha Yagnam	"Ayyo Idhi Amanusham"	Vandemataram Srinivas
2008	Gajendra	"Challani Punnami"	D. Imman
2008	Maa Ayana Chanti Pilladu	"Emandoy Sreevaru"	M. M. Srilekha
2009	Ajantha	"Rave Swarama"(Version l)	Ilaiyaraaja
2009	Ajantha	"Rave Swarama"(Version ll)	Ilaiyaraaja
2009	Aa Okkadu	"Vuruko Manasa"	Mani Sharma
2009	Mitrudu	"Aakasham Nunchi"	Mani Sharma
2009	Raju Maharaju	"Mamatala Kovela"	Chakri
2009	Joy	"Megham Madhuram"	Vidhya Sagar
2009	Sarvam	"Andhe Aakasham"	Yuvan Shankar Raja
2010	Taj Mahal	"Chellani Premaku"	M. M. Srilekha
2010	Kalayanram Kathi	"Jai Jai Ram"	Mani Sharma
2010	Yuganiki Okkadu	"Singarinchina"	G. V. Prakash Kumar
2010	Yuganiki Okkadu	"Daachindi Manne"	G. V. Prakash Kumar
2010	Yuganiki Okkadu	"Mammalni Paalinchi"	G. V. Prakash Kumar
2010	Lava Kusa: The Warrior Twins	"Niliche Sathyam"	L. Vaidyanathan
2010	1977	"Oke Oka"	Vidhya Sagar
2010	Love Journey	"Punnami Punnami"	Satish Chakravarthy
2013	Kadali	"Chitti Jaabili"	A. R. Rahman
2013	Dalam	"Yetellina"	James Vasanthan
2013	Yedalo	"Raagam Yedaina"	Jagadish Pamarthi
2013	Aata Aarambham	"Neelala Ninge Pale"	Yuvan Shankar Raja
2014	Legend	"Nee Kanti Choopulloki"	Devi Sri Prasad
2014	Malini 22	"Navve Kaluva"(Male)	Aravind - Shankar
2014	Malini 22	"Navve Kaluva"(Duet)	Aravind - Shankar
2014	Govindudu Andarivadele	"Bavagari Choope"	Yuvan Shankar Raja
2014	Erra Bus	"Ontariga Nuvvunte"	Chakri
2014	Erra Bus	"Aakashana"	Chakri
2014	Manasunu Maaya Seyake	"Konnallu Kallalona"	Manikanth Kadri
2014	Kaththi	"Ye Kadupu Panto"	Anirudh Ravichander
2015	Gayakudu	"Votame Oka Patam Raa"	Roshan Saluri
2015	Tommy	"Aakasham Pampinda"	Chakri
2015	Tommy	"Nuvve Kanipinchaka"	Chakri
2016	Kalyana Vaibhogame	"Evaru Neevu"	Kalyani Malik
2016	Manyam Puli	"Muvvalane Navvinche"	Gopi Sundar
2016	Oka Manasu	"Hrudayama Kalusuko"	Sunil Kashyap
2016	Premam	"Evare"	Rajesh Murugesan
2016	Araku Road Lo	"Yemo Yemaindo"	Rahul Raj
2017	Shatamanam Bhavati	"Shatamanam Bhavathi"	Mickey J. Meyer
2017	Sriramudinta Srikrishnudanta	"Adugutho Aduge"	Naresh Penta
2017	Kaadhali	"Nuvvante Nenani"	Prasan Praveen Shyam
2017	Nene Raju Nene Mantri	"Radhamma Radhamma"	Anup Rubens
2017	Venkatapuram	"Thanevaro"(Reprise)	Achu Rajamani
2017	Gunturodu	"Kadhile Rangula"	DJ Vasanth
2018	Jai Simha	"Anaganaga Anaganaga"	Chirantan Bhatt
2018	Nela Ticket	"Chuttu Janam"	Shaktikanth Karthik
2018	Shailaja Reddy Alludu	"Pelli Pandiri"	Gopi Sundar
2018	Bhairava Geetha	"Bhagavad Geetha"	Ravi Shankar
2018	Ala	"Ala Loni"	Srinivas Sharma Rani
2018	Sathya Gang	"Yevaru Chesina"	Prabhas
2018	Co Co Kokila	"Gun's Love"	Anirudh Ravichander
2018	A2A (Ameerpet To America)	"Gaganam Aagindha"	Karthik Kodakandla
2019	Dear Comrade	"O Kalala"(Reprise)	Justin Prabhakaran
2019	Guna 369	"Manasukidi Garalam"	Chaitan Bharadwaj
2019	Tholu Bommalata	"Goppadira Manishi"	Suresh Bobbili
2019	Aswamedham	"Ganesha"	Charan Arjun
2019	Prati Roju Pandage	"Chinnataname"	S. Thaman
2019	Prema Janta	"O Prema"	Nikhilesh Thogari
2020	Degree College	"Neeve Neeve"	Sunil Kashyap
2020	Oka Chinna Viramam	"Yeduruga Ranamunna"	Bharath Manchiraju
2020	Uma Maheswara Ugra Roopasya	"Ningi Chutte"	Bijibal
2020	Nishabdham	"Ee Premante Inthey"	Gopi Sundar
2020	Middle Class Melodies	"Manchidho Cheddadho"	Sweekar Agasty
2021	Ninnila Ninnila	"Naa Kosam"	Rajesh Murugesan
2021	Ninnila Ninnila	"Nee Mayalo Padithe"	Rajesh Murugesan
2021	99 Songs	"O Maanava"	A. R. Rahman
2021	Ippudu Kaaka Inkeppudu	"Tharikita Thatthom"	Suresh Banisetti
2021	Asalem Jarigindhi	"Ningilona Chadhamaama"	Yelender Mahaveer
2022	Shekar	"Sathyam Shivam"	Anup Rubens
2022	Jetty	"Nela Ralipoyene"	Karthik Kodakandla
2023	Geetha Sakshiga	"Evaru Nuvvu"	Gopi Sundar
2023	Vasantha Kokila	"Lokaale Vidichi"	Rajesh Murugesan
2023	Custody	"Anna Thammulante"	Ilaiyaraaja
2023	Nayakudu	"Pranama Pranama"	A. R. Rahman
2023	Prema Geema Thassadiyya	"Kalale Pongi"	Kiran Nairuth
2024	Lal Salaam	"Alla Nee Valle"	A. R. Rahman
2024	Chitti Potti	"Chitti Potti Chitti Potti"	Sri Venkat
2025	Anaganaga	"Chudu Chudu"	Chandu Ravi
2026	Bad Boy Karthik	"Pommante"	Harris Jayaraj
2026	Rao Bahadur	"O Sundari"	Smaran Sai

=== Malayalam discography (partial) ===
Year	Title	Songs	Composer
1987	Idanazhiyil Oru Kaalocha	Karaagre Vasathe	V. Dakshinamoorthy
2000	Life Is Beautiful	"Kelinilaavoru Palazhi	Ouseppachan
2000	Millennium Stars	Oh Mumbai	Vidyasagar
2000	Millennium Stars	Krishna Krishna	Vidyasagar
2000	Millennium Stars	Shravan Gange	Vidyasagar
2000	Millennium Stars	Mahaganapatim	Vidyasagar
2000	Dada Sahib	"Thaliyoor Bhagavathike"	Mohan Sithara
2000	Indriyam	"Manju Thazhvaram"	Berny–Ignatius
2001	Aparanmar Nagarathil	"Swapangalil"	Sanan Nair K
2002	Kaiyethum Doorath	"Vasantharavin"	Ousepachan
2002	Puthooramputhri Unniyarcha	"Padam Padam"	G. Devarajan
2002	Adheena	"Shishrardra"	Natesh
2010	Avan	"Thozha En Thozha"	Anil Gopalan
2010	Avan	"Orukunjukkattin"	Vijay Yesudas
2012	Spirit	"Mazhakondu Mathram"	Shahabaz Aman
2013	Hotel California	"Manju Theerum"	Shaan Rahman
2013	Drishyam	"Nizhale Nee Evide"	Anil Johnson
2014	Ettekaal Second	"Katharamam"	K Santhosh
2015	100 Days of Love	"Hridayathin"	Govind Vasantha
2015	Premam	"Malare"	Rajesh Murugesan
2017	Munthirivallikal Thalirkkumbol	"Athimara Kombile"	M. Jayachandran
2018	369	"Irulala Than Maraneekki"	Pradeep Babu
2018	Ranam	"Pathiye"	Jakes Bejoy
2019	Rakshapurushan	"Parayu Engu Nee"	Jibin George Sebastian
2019	Vijay Superum Pournamiyum	"Etho Mazhayil", "Pakalaay"	Prince George
2019	Puzhikkadakan	"Ponveyilin"	Ranjith Meleppat
2019	A for Apple	"Thottu Thottu Vidarnnu"	Jerry Amaldev
2020	Ala Vaikunthapurramuloo - (Dubbed)	"Samajavaragamana"	Thaman S
2022	RRR	"Priyam"	M. M. Keeravani
2022	RRR	"Etthuka Jenda"	M. M. Keeravani
2022	Class By A Soldier	"Rashtrapathaaka"	SR Suraj
2026	Khalifa: The Ruler	"Periyavane"	Jakes Bejoy

=== Tamil discography ===
Year	Film	Songs	Composer
2000	Krodham 2	"Baba Baba"	Deva
2001	Friends	"Rukku Rukku"	Ilaiyaraja
2002	Junior Senior	"Naan Oruvan"	Yuvan Shankar Raja
2002	Solla Marandha Kadhai	"Amma Sonna"	Ilaiyaraaja
2003	Arasu	"Malligai Malligai"	Mani Sharma
2003	Joot	"Enna Enna"	Vidyasagar
2003	Julie Ganapathi	"Enaku Piditha"(Male)	Ilaiyaraaja
2003	Jayam	"Kodi Kodi Minnalkal"	R. P. Patnaik
2003	Kadhal Kondein	"Kadhal Kadhal"	Yuvan Shankar Raja
2003	Konji Pesalaam	"Siru Siru Siragugalil"	Ilaiyaraaja
2003	Manasellam	"Oru Jodi Kuyil"	Ilaiyaraaja
2004	Azhagesan	"Kala Kalavena"(Solo)	Deva
2004	Azhagesan	"Nee Kidaicha"	Deva
2004	Gambeeram	"Naanaga Naan"	Mani Sharma
2004	Jai	"Kanavu Kaanalam"	Mani Sharma
2004	Singara Chennai	"Apparum Enna"	Karthik Raja
2005	Adhu Oru Kana Kaalam	"Antha Naal"	Ilaiyaraaja
2005	Andha Naal Nyabagam	"Naan Vazhnthida"	Bharadwaj
2005	Karagattakkari	"Saada Maada"	Ilaiyaraaja
2005	London	"Badavaa"	Vidyasagar
2005	Raam	"Nizhalinai Nijamum"	Yuvan Shankar Raja
2005	Raam	"Manidhan Solgindra"	Yuvan Shankar Raja
2005	Sandakozhi	"Dhavanipotta Deepavali"	Yuvan Shankar Raja
2005	Vetrivel Sakthivel	"Kollaikara"	Srikanth Deva
2006	Em Magan	"Kalluri Generation"	Vidyasagar
2006	Ilakkanam	"Thangiduma"	Bhavatharini
2006	Jambhavan	"Ethanai Varusham"	Bharadwaj
2006	Kaanal Neer	"Chella Chella"	Suresh Bobby
2006	Kaanal Neer	"Yenakena Pirantha"	Suresh Bobby
2006	Kalvanin Kadhali	"Tajmahal Oviya Kadhal"	Yuvan Shankar Raja
2006	Nenjirukkum Varai	"Puduchirukku"	Srikanth Deva
2006	Oru Kadhal Seiveer	"Devathaye Devathaye'	Bharani
2006	Pattiyal	"Dei Namma Melam"	Yuvan Shankar Raja
2006	Pattiyal	"Poga Poga Bhoomi"	Yuvan Shankar Raja
2006	Pudhupettai	"Pulpesum Poo Pesum"	Yuvan Shankar Raja
2006	Sudesi	"Nooru Kodi Minnal"	Srikanth Deva
2006	Thirupathi	"Yenaiye Yenaku"	Bharadwaj
2006	Thiruvilaiyaadal Aarambam	"Kannukkul Yetho"	D. Imman
2006	Vallavan	"Podu Attam Podu"	Yuvan Shankar Raja
2007	Billa	"Seval Kodi"	Yuvan Shankar Raja
2007	Chennai 600028	"Un Paarvai Mele Pattal"	Yuvan Shankar Raja
2007	Deepavali	"Kadhal Vaithu"	Yuvan Shankar Raja
2007	Dhandayuthapani	"Vanam Muzhuvathum"	Sunil, EL Indhrajit
2007	Kannamoochi Yenada	"Putham Pudhu"	Yuvan Shankar Raja
2007	Kireedam	"Kanneer Thuliye'	G. V. Prakash Kumar
2007	Malaikottai	"Devathaye Vaa Vaa"	Mani Sharma
2007	Maya Kannadi	"Ulagile Azhagi"	Ilaiyaraaja
2007	Nee Naan Nila	"En Kadhal Deiva"	Dhina
2007	Nenjai Thodu	"En Thai Aval"	Srikanth Deva
2007	Oru Ponnu Oru Paiyan	"Yaana Pasi"	Karthik Raja
2007	Parattai Engira Azhagu Sundaram	"Adithadi"	Gurukiran
2007	Piragu	"Amma Appa"	Srikanth Deva
2007	Pirappu	"Vaazhkayin Paathayil"	Bharadwaj
2007	Puli Varudhu	"Aasai Vachen"	Srikanth Deva
2007	Sivaji: The Boss	"Sahara Pookal"	A. R. Rahman
2007	Thaamirabharani	"Kattabomman Oorenaku"	Yuvan Shankar Raja
2007	Thottal Poo Malarum	"Valaiyal Karangalai"	Yuvan Shankar Raja
2008	Bheemaa	"Rangu Rangamma"	Harris Jayaraj
2008	Kee Mu	"Layilo Layilo"	Elango Kalavanan
2008	Ini Varum Kaalam	"Yaari Inghu"	Bharani
2008	Nenjathai Killadhe	"Kadhale Nee"	Premgi Amaren
2008	Sadhu Miranda	"Habibi Habibi"	Deepak Dev
2008	Saroja	"Aaja Meri Soniye"	Yuvan Shankar Raja
2008	Seval	"Kannamma Kannamma"	G. V. Prakash Kumar
2008	Thodakkam	"Vaa Nanba"	Jerome Pushparaj
2008	Thozha	"Adiye En Annakili"	Premgi Amaren
2008	Vaitheeswaran	"Kangalum Thoongathey"	Srikanth Deva
2008	Vedha	"Ninaitha Paavam"	Srikanth Deva
2008	Vedha	"Vilakkinil"	Srikanth Deva
2009	1977	"Ore Oru"	Vidyasagar
2009	Adhe Neram Adhe Idam	"Vennilavu"	Premgi Amaren
2009	Engal Aasan	"Solli Tharava"	Sabesh–Murali
2009	Mathiya Chennai	"Ennda Dai"	Ilaiyaraaja
2009	Mayandi Kudumbathar	"Onna Thangave"	Sabesh–Murali
2009	Pokkisham	"Nila Nee Vaanam"	Sabesh–Murali
2009	Pokkisham	"Aaj Monee"	Sabesh–Murali
2009	Renigunta	"Vazhkai"	Ganesh Raghavendra
2009	Saa Boo Thiri	"Athu Oru Adaimazhi"(Duet)	Abbas Rafi
2009	Saa Boo Thiri	"Athu Oru Adaimazhi"(Male)	Abbas Rafi
2009	Sarvam	"Sutta Suriyanae"	Yuvan Shankar Raja
2009	Thoranai	"Pattucha"	Mani Sharma
2009	Vaamanan	"Enge Povadhu"	Yuvan Shankar Raja
2009	Vedigundu Murugesan	"Neenda Thooram"	Dhina
2010	Aayirathil Oruvan	"Thaai Thindra Mannae"	G. V. Prakash Kumar
2010	Aayirathil Oruvan	"Thaai Thindra Mannae"(Classical Version)	G. V. Prakash Kumar
2010	Bale Pandiya	"Happy"	Devan Ekambaram
2010	Boss Engira Bhaskaran	"Mama Mama"	Yuvan Shankar Raja
2010	Goripalayam	"Aariraro Kettadhillai'	Sabesh–Murali
2010	Kaadhal Solla Vandhen	"Enna Enna Aagiraen"	Yuvan Shankar Raja
2010	Kanimozhi	"Muzhumadhi"	Satish Chakravarthy
2010	Nandalala	"Kai Veesi"	Ilaiyaraaja
2010	Pugaippadam	"Vaan Nilavudhaan"	Gangai Amaran
2010	Pugaippadam	"Odaikanum Odaikunum"	Gangai Amaran
2010	Theeradha Vilaiyattu Pillai	"En Aasai Ethiraliye"	Yuvan Shankar Raja
2010	Thunichal	"Paiyaa Paiyaa"	Premgi Amaren
2010	Vandae Maatharam	"Vandhe Maatharam"	D. Imman
2010	Yathumaagi	"Parthadum"	James Vasanthan
2011	Avan Ivan	"Oru Malayoram"	Yuvan Shankar Raja
2011	Avargalum Ivargalum	"Idhu Oru Kadhal"	Srikanth Deva
2011	Eththan	"Mazhaiyudhir Kaalam"	Taj Noor
2011	Maharaja	"Hello Nanbaa"	D. Imman
2011	Mankatha	"Balle Lakka"	Yuvan Shankar Raja
2011	Mappillai	"Aaru Padai"	Mani Sharma
2011	Mudhal Idam	"Thindaduren Naane"	D. Imman
2011	Muthukku Muthaaga	"Enna Panni Tholacha"	Kavi Periyathambi
2011	Narthagi	"Jai Jai Madha Sonthasi"	G. V. Prakash Kumar
2011	Pesu	"Ketti Melam"	Yuvan Shankar Raja
2011	Vedi	"Enna Aachi"	Vijay Antony
2012	3	"Nee Paartha Vizhigal"	Anirudh Ravichandran
2012	Nellai Santhippu	"Vizhigalil Udhiruthe"	Yugendran
2012	Sembattai	"Muthe Muthe"	Sreeraghav
2013	Aadhalal Kadhal Seiveer	"Poovum Poovum"	Yuvan Shankar Raja
2013	All in All Azhagu Raja	"Unnai Partha Neram"	Thaman S
2013	Arrambam	"Neelala Vedikudhu"	Yuvan Shankar Raja
2013	Kadal	"Chithirai Nela"	A. R. Rahman
2013	Kan Pesum Vaarthaigal	"Peyarilla Mozhiyile"	Shamanth
2013	Kedi Billa Killadi Ranga	"Dheivangal Ellam"	Yuvan Shankar Raja
2013	Thirumathi Thamizh	"Nayagan"	S. A. Rajkumar
2013	Varuthapadatha Valibar Sangam	"Paarkathae Paarkathe"	D. Imman
2014	Ennamo Nadakkudhu	"Messa Kokkudhan"	Premgi Amaren
2014	Koottam	"Nigarputha Pinangal"	James Vasanthan
2014	Malini 22 Palayamkottai	"Kanneer Thuliye'"(Male)	Aravind - Shankar
2014	Malini 22 Palayamkottai	"Kanneer Thuliye'"(Duet)	Aravind - Shankar
2014	Nee Naan Nizhal	"Naetrirunthal"	Jecin George
2014	Ninaivil Nindraval	"Ennavale"	D. Imman
2014	Vanavarayan Vallavarayan	"Thakaaliku Thavaniya"	Yuvan Shankar Raja
2014	Vidiyum Varai Pesu	"Yaro Aval Yaro"	Mohanji
2015	Achaaram	"En Veettukku"	Srikanth Deva
2015	Dharani	"Malapola Unna"	Yensose Bakyanathan
2015	Ivanuku Thannila Gandam	"Mappilla Mappilla"	A7
2015	Isai	"Nee Poiyyaa"	S. J. Suryah
2015	Urumeen	"Hey Umayaal"	Achu Rajamani
2015	Yatchan	"Parapara"	Yuvan Shankar Raja
2016	Aarathu Sinam	"Thanimaye"	Thaman S
2016	Achamindri	"Thavivarum Azhai Kadal"	Premgi Amaren
2016	Achcham Yenbadhu Madamaiyada	"Avalum Naanum"	A. R. Rahman
2016	Bangalore Naatkal	"Thodakkam Mankalyam"	Gopi Sundar
2016	Miruthan	"Mirutha Mirutha"	D. Imman
2017	Balloon	"Uyirile Uyirile"	Yuvan Shankar Raja
2017	Engeyum Naan Iruppen	"Vithiyo Sathiyo"	ES Ram
2017	Engeyum Naan Iruppen	"Kaatrodu Deepam"	ES Ram
2017	Gemini Ganeshanum Suruli Raajanum	"Thambi Cuttingu"	D. Imman
2017	Shivalinga	"Sirika Vechu"	Thaman S
2017	Naan Aanaiyittaal	"Thenamma Thenamma"	Anup Rubens
2017	Richie	"Thaayai Thedi"	B. Ajaneesh Loknath
2017	Sathriyan	"Maina Rendu"	Yuvan Shankar Raja
2017	Solo	"Thoovaanam"	Abhinav Bansal
2017	Ullam Ullavarai	"Pollachi Maapillai"	Satish Chakravarthy
2017	Vanamagan	"Silu Silu"	Harris Jayaraj
2018	Keni	"Vedithidum Bhoomi"	Kallara Gopan
2018	Kolamaavu Kokila	"Gun In Kadhal"	Anirudh Ravichander
2018	Padaiveeran	"Inaiye Inaiye"	Karthik Raja
2018	Padaiveeran	"Hkkumtada"	Karthik Raja
2018	Saavi	"Thuli Thuli"(Duet)	Satish Thaianban
2019	Peranbu	"Dhooramaai"	Yuvan Shankar Raja
2019	Naan Avalai Sandhitha Pothu	"Poo Meedhu"	Jithesh Murugavel
2019	Naan Avalai Sandhitha Pothu	"Kannadi Kanavugale"	Jithesh Murugavel
2019	RK Nagar	"Yei Oodu Oodu"	Premgi Amaren
2019	Kennedy Club	"Unnale Unnale"	D. Imman
2019	Devarattam	"Ulagam Unna"	Nivas K. Prasanna
2020	Kanni Maadam	"Oru Veedu"	Hari Sai
2020	Meendum Oru Mariyathai	"Kodi Kodiyai"	N. R. Raghunanthan
2020	Pattas	"Piriyadhe Enna"	Vivek-Mervin
2021	99 Songs	"Oor Aayiram Vaanavil"	A. R. Rahman
2021	Kalathil Santhippom	"Yaar Antha Oviyaththai"	Yuvan Shankar Raja
2021	Theeni (D)	"Naan Ketten"	Rajesh Murugesan
2021	Theeni (D)	"Undhan Siripinile"	Rajesh Murugesan
2021	Yuvarathnaa (D)	"Dhesaththin Balama"	Thaman S
2021	Endravaathu Oru Naal	"Kanne En"	N. R. Raghunanthan
2022	Thiruchitrambalam	"Kanneer Sindha"	Anirudh Ravichander
2022	Veetla Vishesham	"Kalyaana Paattu"	Girishh G.
2023	Vasantha Mullai	"Vaanmegam"	Rajesh Murugesan
2023	Vaathi	"Kalangudhe"	G. V. Prakash Kumar
2023	Custody	"Ettu Thesa"	Ilaiyaraaja
2023	Takkar	"Maragatha Maalai"	Nivas K. Prasanna
2023	Maamannan	"Nenjame Nenjame"	A. R. Rahman
2023	Kozhipannai Chelladurai	"Kaiyenthi"	N. R. Raghunanthan

=== Kannada discography ===
Year	Film	Songs	Composer
2005	Jogi	"Hodi Maga"	Gurukiran
2005	Nenapirali	"Ajantha Ellora"	Hamsalekha
2006	Ravi Shastri	"Hennige"	Rajesh Ramanath
2006	Shubham	"Love Kane"	Gurukiran
2006	Thavarina Siri	"Mathad Mathadu"	Hamsalekha
2007	Loki	"Jogulla"	Ram Narayan
2007	Loki	"Nanna Bitu"	Ram Narayan
2007	Amrutha Vaani	"Jigidu Jigidu Haado"	M P Naidu
2007	Gunavantha	"Chandira O Chandira"	Hamsalekha
2007	Aa Dinagalu	"Aa Dinagalu"	Ilayaraja
2007	Aa Dinagalu	"Aa Dinagalu"(Duet)	Ilayaraja
2007	Honganasu	"Baa Nagu Nannondige"	Hamsalekha
2007	Lava Kusha	"Kamanna Makkalu"	Gurukiran
2007	Vidyarthi	"Nammellaranu"	R. P. Patnaik
2007	Poojari	"Janma Kotta Thaayi"	Abhiman
2008	Minchina Ota	"Aa Moda Hani"	V. Manohar
2008	Minchina Ota	"Minchante Bandey"	V. Manohar
2008	Minchina Ota	"Oh Mega Hogi Baa"	V. Manohar
2008	Yuga Yugagale Saagali	"Aadanga Baari"	Hamsalekha
2009	Abhimani	"Kaalayenuva"	Dharma Theja
2009	Devaru Kotta Thangi	"Ee Loka"	Hamsalekha
2009	Kempa	"Suridu Bidu"	Gurukiran
2009	Shishira	"Ello Ello"	B. Ajaneesh Loknath
2009	Swathanthra Palya	"Kannu Kannu"	MN Krupakar
2009	Yodha	"Namm India"	Hamsalekha
2010	Nannavanu	"Denna Dennanna"	Ilaiyaraaja
2010	Nannavanu	"Hey Maamu"	Ilaiyaraaja
2010	Naayaka	"Jeeva Nanna Jeeva"	Praveen Dath
2010	Preethiya Theru	"Yendennu Maya"	Prasad
2010	Vaare Vah	"Hey Naari Ningyaare"	Avinash - Vishwajith
2012	Arakshaka	"Kuch Kuch"	Gurukiran
2013	Kaveri Nagar	"Bhoomili"	Pradip Raj
2013	Veera	"Indiyana"	Hamsalekha
2015	Katte	"Savira Daiva"	S. A. Rajkumar
2016	Nan Love Track	"Naadu Beediyalli"	Praveen; Shyam Prasanna
2017	Dream Girl	"Doora Doora Dooravadalu"	V. Manohar
2018	Bhairava Geetha	"Nee Nanna"	Ravi Shankar
2019	Haftha	"Devare Devare"	Vijay Yardley
2021	Mugilpete	"Sigadu Endu"	V. Sridhar
2023	Vasantha Kokila	"Hey Megha"	Rajesh Murugesan
2024	Abbabba	"Ayyayyo"	Deepak Alexander
2026	Bail	"Magale Magale"	B. Ajaneesh Loknath

=== Hindi discography ===
Year	Film	Songs	Composer
2004	Phir Milenge	"Kuchh Pal"	Bhavatharini
2004	Phir Milenge	"Phir Milenge"	Bhavatharini
2006	Chup Chup Ke	"Tumhi Se"	Himesh Reshammiya
2007	Dhol	"Bheega Aasman"	Pritam
2010	Jhootha Hi Sahi	"I've Been Waiting"	A.R Rahman
2010	Lava Kusa: The Warrior Twins	"Satya Sanathan"	L. Vaidyanathan
2019	Mamangam	"Penne Thirumudi"	M. Jayachandran

== Filmography ==
Year	Title	Role	Language	Notes
2010	Avan	Ramanujan	Malayalam	
2015	Maari	Arjun Kumar	Tamil	
2018	Padaiveeran	Munishwaran	Tamil	
2023	Salmon 3D	Sarfarosh	Tamil	
2023	Kolaambi	Himself	Malayalam	Cameo appearance
2023	Class By A Soldier	Soldier	Malayalam	
2025	Paranthu Po	Jenna's father	Tamil	
2026	G.D.N	Periyar	Tamil	

== See also ==
- List of Indian playback singers
