= Talker (disambiguation) =

A talker is a chat system.

Talker, Talkers, or The Talker may also refer to:

- Talker (album), by U.S. Maple, 1999
- Ofer Talker, Israeli footballer and manager
- The Talker, 1925 film
- Talkers Magazine, a trade-industry publication

== See also ==
- Big Talker (disambiguation)
- Sweet Talker (disambiguation)
