= Aditya Music =

Indian music company

Aditya Music (India) Private Limited
- Type: Private
- Industry: Music; Entertainment
- Founded: 1993
- Headquarters: Hyderabad, Telangana, India
- Area served: Global
- Key people: Umesh Gupta (Managing Director)
- Products: Music; Entertainment
- Services: Music record label
- Number of employees: 250
- Subsidiaries: Sangeet Sagar
- Website: www.adityamusic.com

Aditya Music is an Indian music record label company, which owns the label Aditya Music. It produces music for the Telugu cinema industry and is headquartered at Hyderabad, Telangana.

== Overview ==
The company was founded by Umesh Gupta, initially as a distribution and marketing company for music labels in Andhra Pradesh. In 1996, the label Aditya Music was established, and in 2000 they began manufacturing audio cassettes.

== Soundtrack discography ==
=== Telugu cinema ===
- Swathi Muthyam (1985)
- Oke Okkadu (1999)
- Thammudu (1999)
- Gemini (2002)
- Amma Nanna O Tamila Ammayi (2003)
- Devullu (2000)
- Siva Rama Raju (2002)
- Sri Anjaneyam (2004)
- Varsham (2004)
- Jai Chiranjeeva (2005)
- Athadu (2005)
- Bangaram (2006)
- Stalin (2006)
- Pournami (2006)
- Sri Ramadasu (2006)
- Desamuduru (2007)
- Maharathi (2007)
- Guru (2007)
- Pandurangadu (2008)
- Magadheera (2009)
- Jhummandi Naadam (2010)
- Sri Rama Rajyam (2011)
- Shakti (2011)
- Oosaravelli (2011)
- 100% Love (2011)
- Businessman (2012)
- Damarukam (2012)
- Naayak (2013)
- Seethamma Vakitlo Sirimalle Chettu (2013)
- Baadshah (2013)
- Mukunda (2014)
- Jai Bolo Telangana (2014)
- Avatharam (2014)
- S/O Satyamurthy (2015)
- Srimanthudu (2015)
- A Aa (2016)
- Babu Bangaram (2016)
- Dhruva (2016)
- Arjun Reddy (2017)
- Middle Class Abbayi (2017)
- Kaadhali (2017)
- Raja The Great (2017)
- DJ: Duvvada Jagannadham (2017)
- Naa Peru Surya (2018)
- Agnyaathavaasi (2018)
- Maharshi (2019)
- Ranarangam (2019)
- Oh! Baby (2019)
- Ala Vaikunthapurramuloo (2020)
- Bheeshma (2020)
- Uppena (2021)
- Love Story (2021)
- Alanti Sitralu (2021)
- Most Eligible Bachelor (2021)
- Pushpa: The Rise (2021)
- Rowdy Boys (2022)
- Hero (2022)
- Acharya (2022)
- Bheemla Nayak (2022)
- Khiladi (2022)
- Ghani (2022)
- Tillu Square (2023)
- Guntur Kaaram (2024)
- Gaami (2024)
- Chitti Potti (2024)
- Laggam (2024)
- Lucky Baskhar (2024)
- Thandel (2025)
- Kuberaa (2025)

=== Tamil cinema ===
==== Old albums acquired ====
- 1992 Thevar Magan
- 1992 Mannan
- 1992 Naalaya Seidhi
- 1993 Ejamaan
- 1993 Kalaignan
- 1993 Gentleman
- 1993 Kizhakku Cheemayile
- 1993 Uzhavan
- 1994 Magalir Mattum
- 1994 Vandicholai Chinraasu
- 1994 Duet
- 1994 Rasigan
- 1994 May Madham
- 1994 Pavithra
- 1994 Karuththamma
- 1994 Pudhiya Mannargal
- 1993 Bombay
- 1995 Aasai
- 1995 Muthu
- 1996 Love Birds
- 1996 Indian
- 1996 Mr. Romeo
- 1997 Iruvar
- 1997 Once More
- 1998 Udhavikku Varalaamaa
- 1998 Harichandra
- 1998 Pooveli
- 1999 En Swasa Kaatre
- 1999 Endrendrum Kadhal
- 1999 Padayappa
- 1999 Sangamam
- 1999 Poovellam Kettuppar

==== New albums ====
- 2017 Theeran Adhigaaram Ondru
- 2019 Adithya Varma
- 2021 Kabadadaari
- 2022 Yutha Satham
- 2022 The Warriorr
- 2022 Prince
- 2023 Vaathi
- 2024 Rathnam
- 2025 Kaantha

== See also ==
- Lists of record labels
