= Veerapuram 220 =

Indian Tamil-language film

- Poster
- Directed by: B. Senthil Kumar
- Written by: B. Senthil Kumar
- Produced by: Sundhar Rajan Ponnusamy
- Starring: Mahesh; Megna; Satheesh Subramaniyam
- Cinematography: P.S. Prem Kumar
- Edited by: C.Ganesh Kumar
- Music by: Rithesh; Shridhar
- Production company: Subham Cine Creations
- Distributed by: Action Reaction Jenish
- Release date: 24 September 2021
- Country: India
- Language: Tamil

Veerapuram 220 is a 2021 Indian Tamil-language film written and directed by B. Senthil Kumar. The film stars Mahesh and Megna in the lead roles. The film was produced by Sundhar Rajan Ponnusamy under the banner of Subham Cine Creations.

== Cast ==
- Mahesh
- Megna
- Satheesh Subramaniyam

== Production ==
The film was produced by Sundhar Rajan Ponnusamy under the banner of Subham Cine Creations. The cinematography was done by P. S. Prem Kumar, while editing was handled by C. Ganesh Kumar. The Pooja of the film was held at A V M Studio Ganesha Temple. The audio launch event was held on 13 September 2021.

== Reception ==
A critic from Dina Thanthi wrote that "Satish as the villain is a perfect choice". A critic from Maalai Malar noted that "Director P Senthil Kumar, who has tried to tell a story with social concern, has drawn the line in the screenplay".
