= Ameira Punvani =

Indian costume designer and celebrity stylist

- Born: Lucknow, Uttar Pradesh, India
- Education: Lady Shri Ram College for Women
- Occupations: Costume designer and celebrity stylist
- Years active: 2004–present
- Spouse: Shiv Panditt (m. 2018)

Ameira Punvani is an Indian costume designer and celebrity stylist who works in Hindi cinema (Bollywood).

== Career ==
Punvani graduated from Lady Shri Ram College for Women in 2000.

She started her film career with Let's Enjoy in 2004. She got her big banner break with Yash Raj Films' Bunty Aur Babli in 2005 and Badmaash Company in 2010. She got noticed for her work in the period drama film Guru in 2007 directed by Mani Ratnam, for which she was nominated for the Filmfare Award for Best Costume Design and in the crime thriller film Rustom in 2016 directed by Tinu Suresh Desai, for which she was nominated for the Stardust Award for Best Costume Design. She was further lauded for her work in the crime drama film David in 2013 directed by Bejoy Nambiar.

== Filmography ==
Punvani was costume stylist for the following feature films:

Year	Film	Director
2004	Let's Enjoy	Siddharth Anand Kumar and Ankur Tewari
2005	Bunty Aur Babli	Shaad Ali
2006	Zinda	Sanjay Gupta
2006	Banras	Pankaj Parashar
2007	Guru	Mani Ratnam
2009	Shortkut: The Con is On	Neeraj Vora
2010	Teen Patti	Leena Yadav
2010	Badmaash Company	Parmeet Sethi
2013	David	Bejoy Nambiar
2016	Rustom	Tinu Suresh Desai
2018	Raid	Raj Kumar Gupta
2019	Romeo Akbar Walter	Robbie Grewal
2019	Section 375	Ajay Bahl

=== Other ===
Year	Title	Director	Type
2007	Positive	Farhan Akhtar	Short film
2008	Zara Nachke Dikha (Season 2)		Television
2012	Deja Vu (with French costume designer Madeline Fontaine)	Wong Kar-wai	Short film
2017	Chhuri	Mansi Jain	Short film
2017	Inside Edge (Season 1)	Karan Anshuman	Web series
2018	The Playboy Mr. Sawhney	Tariq Naved Siddiqui	Short film

=== Music videos ===
- Ghoom Tana - Duet by : Salman Ahmad & Shubha Mudgal - Directed by Saqib Malik - Styled the costumes for Nandita Das
- Chalte Chalte - The Haveli Mix - A remix of the song from the film Pakeezah - Styled the costumes for Roshni Chopra * Pathway to the Unknown - Duet by : Amaan Ali Khan & Ayaan Ali Khan - Directed by Shiraz Bhattacharya - Styled the costumes for Amaan Ali Khan and Ayaan Ali Khan
- Mere Baap Pehle Aap - Title song of the film Mere Baap Pehle Aap - Directed by Priyadarshan - Styled the costumes for Akshaye Khanna
- Ishq Subhan Allah - Song from the film Mere Baap Pehle Aap - Directed by Priyadarshan - Styled the costumes for Akshaye Khanna
- Khoya Khoya Chand - The Bartender Mix - A remix of the song from the film Kala Bazar for the film Shaitan - Directed by Bejoy Nambiar - Styled the costumes for Karishma Tanna, Avinash Tiwary, Gulshan Devaiah, Neil Bhoopalam, Rajkummar Rao, Kirti Kulhari and Shiv Panditt
- Fuk Fuk Fukrey - Title song of the film Fukrey - Directed by Shujaat Saudagar - Styled the costumes for Pulkit Samrat, Ali Fazal, Manjot Singh, Varun Sharma, Priya Anand and Vishakha Singh
- Lag Gayi Lottery- Song from the film Fukrey - Directed by Shujaat Saudagar - Styled the costumes for Pulkit Samrat, Ali Fazal, Manjot Singh, Varun Sharma, Priya Anand and Vishakha Singh
- Tan Tan Tan- Sarva Shiksha Abhiyan - Right to Education Scheme (Educational Initiative Video) - Directed by Shujaat Saudagar - Styled the costumes for Anushka Sharma
- Phool Khil Jayenge - Tikakaran Abhiyan - Child Immunization Scheme (Educational Initiative Video) - Directed by Ruchi Narain - Styled the costumes for Farhan Akhtar
- Ishq Karenge - Song from the film Bangistan - Directed by Shujaat Saudagar - Styled the costumes for Pulkit Samrat, Jacqueline Fernandez and Riteish Deshmukh
- Maula - Song from the film Bangistan - Directed by Shujaat Saudagar - Styled the costumes for Pulkit Samrat, Jacqueline Fernandez and Riteish Deshmukh
- You Know What I Mean - Song from the film Rock On 2 - Directed by Farah Khan - Styled the costumes for Farhan Akhtar, Luke Kenny, Arjun Rampal and Purab Kohli
- Kudi Daru Wargi Aa - Song from the film Why Cheat India - Directed by Nitin Parmar - Styled the costumes for Emraan Hashmi and Shreya Dhanwanthary

== Awards ==
Year	Film	Award	Category	Result
2008	Guru	Filmfare Awards	Best Costume Design	Nominated
2017	Rustom	Stardust Awards	Best Costume Design	Nominated

== Personal life ==
Punvani is friends with film director Zoya Akhtar and actress Anushka Sharma, the latter whom she met on the sets of the Yash Raj Film, Badmaash Company in 2010.

She married her longtime boyfriend, actor Shiv Panditt in a private ceremony in New Delhi on 18 April 2018.
