= Buddhanin Sirippu =

- Film poster
- Directed by: Victor Davidson
- Written by: Victor Davidson
- Produced by: Suresh Sakaria
- Starring: Samuthirakani; Mahesh; Suresh Sakaria
- Cinematography: Yogesh
- Edited by: Idris
- Music by: Songs: Aj Alimirzaq; Score: F. S. Faizal
- Production companies: The Vibrant Movies; Sakaria Productions
- Release date: 5 June 2015
- Running time: 123 minutes
- Country: India
- Language: Tamil

Buddhanin Sirippu (transl. The Buddha's smile) is a 2015 Indian Tamil language political drama film written and directed by Victor Davidson. The film stars Samuthirakani, Mahesh and Suresh Sakaria with Mithra Kurian and Vivek in supporting roles. It was released on 5 June 2015.

== Cast ==
- Samuthirakani as Vetri
- Mahesh as Kathir
- Suresh Sakaria as Arun
- Mithra Kurian as Nethra
- Vivek as Sundar Raj
- Geetha Vijayan
- A. C. Murali Mohan
- Vasu Vikram
- Munnar Ramesh
- Theepetti Ganesan
- Cell Murugan as Jobless man
- Rajendranath
- Boys Rajan
- Birla Bose

== Production ==
The film began production under the title Aadhaar. Filming was still occurring for the film as of December 2014, but was complete by March 2015, and a trailer was released two months later.

== Release and reception ==
The film was released on 5 June 2015. Malini Mannath from The New Indian Express wrote, "Budhanin Sirippu would have been a meaningful film if only the script had been crafted in a more coherent way" and concluded that the film had "lacklustre narration". A critic from Maalai Malar wrote that the film deserves attention. A critic from Kungumam wrote that Victor Davidson has made a film that addresses social aspects but is not entertaining.
