= Article 370 (soundtrack) =

2024 soundtrack album by Shashwat Sachdev

Soundtrack album by Shashwat Sachdev
- Released: 19 February 2024
- Recorded: 2023–2024
- Genre: Feature film soundtrack
- Length: 25:44
- Language: Hindi
- Label: Saregama
- Producer: Shashwat Sachdev

Shashwat Sachdev chronology
Tejas (2023)	Article 370 (2024)	Kill (2024)
External audio
- Article 370 Full Album on YouTube

Singles from Article 370
- 1. "Dua" Released: 30 January 2024

Article 370 is the soundtrack album to the 2024 Hindi-language political action thriller film of the same name directed by Aditya Suhas Jambhale and produced by Jio Studios and B62 Studios starring Yami Gautam Dhar and Priyamani. The soundtrack featured music composed by Shashwat Sachdev with lyrics written by Osho Jain, Sudhanshu Saria, Kumaar and Sachdev himself. The album was released through Saregama on 19 February 2024, four days ahead of the film's release. Sachdev won the National Film Award for Best Music Direction for his work in the film.

== Background ==
The film's music was composed by Shashwat Sachdev, who shared a close working relationship with one of the film's producers and writers Aditya Dhar on Uri: The Surgical Strike (2019). Sachdev considered that dealing with a subject based on real incidents would prompt composers to go with a conventional approach, but Dhar provided him creative freedom and also insisted to approach the score in an emotional way rather than going intellectual. Hence, the score was designed by blending traditional Kashmiri folk elements with heavy electronic synths. The music was created in a "pure, almost uncompromising space" and was not pressured to follow the trends. While the score was heavily influenced by Western classical movements, especially from Frédéric Chopin, some of the songs remained deeply rooted in Indian classical music.

== Release ==
The album was preceded by the first single "Dua" that was featured in the teaser, and was released on 5 February 2024. The soundtrack was released on 19 February 2024, four days ahead of the film's release, through Saregama record label.

== Reception ==
Outlook-based critic summarized that "Shashwat Sachdev has composed one song that captures the minds of the young as a pop patriotic number". Bollywood Hungama based critic wrote "Shashwat Sachdev's music doesn't register. Ideally, Article 370 should have been a song-less film. But Shashwat Sachdev's background score is kickass and very different from the usual BGMs." Prabhatha Rigobhertha of The South First wrote "The background score by Shashwat Sachdev also helps significantly make the second half more effective."

== Track listing ==
Track listing
No.	Title	Lyrics	Singer(s)	Length
1.	"Ishq Tera"	Osho Jain	Sanjith Hegde, Shashwat Sachdev	3:45
2.	"Main Hoon"	Sudhanshu Saria	Sanjith Hegde, Shashwat Sachdev	3:21
3.	"Aandhi"	Kumaar	Clinton Cerejo, Shehzad Ali, Shashwat Sachdev	3:34
4.	"Dua"	Kumaar	Jubin Nautiyal, Priyanshi Naidu, Shashwat Sachdev	4:38
5.	"Main Tujhe Phir Miloongi"	Kumaar	Vibha Saraf, Shashwat Sachdev	5:32
6.	"Najariya LoFi Cake Mix"	Shashwat Sachdev	Madhubanti Bagchi, Shashwat Sachdev	2:36
7.	"Masters Of The World"	—	—	1:58
Total length:				25:44

== Background score ==
Article 370

Film score by Shashwat Sachdev
- Released: 15 April 2024
- Recorded: 2023–2024
- Genre: film score
- Length: 36:15
- Language: Hindi
- Label: Jio Studios
- Producer: Shashwat Sachdev
External audio
- Article 370 (BGM) on YouTube

The original score composed by Sachdev was released on 15 April 2024 through Jio Studios featuring 19 tracks.

Article 370 (Background Score)
No.	Title	Length
1.	"Tigress of Paradise"	2:08
2.	"Tigress vs Hyena (The Hunt)"	1:38
3.	"Devil's Coronation"	1:41
4.	"The South Block Shuffle"	2:29
5.	"The Art of War"	3:02
6.	"Lightening Meets Storm (Aandhi)"	1:23
7.	"The Raiders"	1:15
8.	"Slaying the Devil"	5:02
9.	"The Gangsters"	1:22
10.	"The Gang"	2:07
11.	"Stairway to Memories"	0:53
12.	"Paradise Lost"	1:35
13.	"Fallen Angels"	1:07
14.	"D-Day"	3:01
15.	"School of Vultures"	2:21
16.	"Slippery Snakes"	1:19
17.	"Corridors of Power"	0:47
18.	"Tick Tick Boom"	2:15
19.	"To Loverboy with Love"	1:21
Total length:		36:15

== Awards ==
Award	Date of ceremony	Category	Recipient(s) and nominee(s)	Result	Ref.
International Indian Film Academy Awards	8–9 March 2025	Best Male Playback Singer	Jubin Nautiyal – ("Dua")	Won	
National Film Awards	18 July 2026	National Film Award for Best Music Direction (Songs)	Shashwat Sachdev	Won	
