= Loev =

2015 Indian romantic drama film by Sudhanshu Saria

- Netflix release poster
- Directed by: Sudhanshu Saria
- Screenplay by: Sudhanshu Saria
- Produced by: Sudhanshu Saria; Arfi Lamba; Katharina Suckale; Jasleen Marwah
- Starring: Dhruv Ganesh; Shiv Panditt
- Cinematography: Sherri Kauk
- Edited by: Nitesh Bhatia
- Music by: Tony Kakkar
- Production companies: Bombay Berlin Film Productions; Four Line Films
- Distributed by: Netflix
- Release dates: 19 November 2015 (Tallinn Film Festival); 1 May 2017 (Netflix)
- Running time: 92 minutes
- Country: India
- Languages: Hindi; English
- Budget: US$1 million (approximate)

Loev (pronounced love) is a 2015 Indian romantic drama film written and directed by Sudhanshu Saria. It stars Dhruv Ganesh and Shiv Panditt as two friends who set off to the Western Ghats for a weekend trip and focuses on their complex emotional and sexual relationship. It was Ganesh's final film, as he died from tuberculosis before its release. Loev also features Siddharth Menon and Rishabh Chaddha in supporting roles. The film's title is a deliberate misspelling of the word "love".

Saria wrote Loev's script while he was working on the draft of the unreleased film I Am Here and drew heavily from his personal experiences. It was eventually picked up for production by Arfi Lamba and Katherine Suckale despite Saria's own doubts on its viability. Principal photography took place at Mahabaleshwar, in the Western Ghats in peninsular India, and at Mumbai. The film was shot in the summer of 2014 over the course of sixteen days by the cinematographer Sherri Kauk in 2K resolution. It relied on crowdfunding and cost-cutting measures; its budget was relatively low at US$1 million.

Loev had its world premiere at the 2015 Tallinn Black Nights Film Festival in Estonia. It had its North American premiere at the 2016 South By Southwest Film Festival and premiered in India at the 2016 Mumbai International Film Festival. It was released on Netflix on 1 May 2017. The film was well received by critics and audiences during its international premieres at film festivals. Particular praise was given for the script, as well as the performances of Ganesh and Panditt. Commentators were also appreciative of the unconventional and fresh treatment of same-sex relationships in India. The film won the Audience Award for Best Feature Film at the 2016 Tel Aviv International Film Festival.

== Plot ==
Sahil (Dhruv Ganesh), a young Mumbai-based musician, plans a weekend getaway to the Western Ghats with his childhood friend, Jai (Shiv Panditt), a successful businessman who lives in New York, but visits Mumbai for a business meeting. The duo drive to Mahabaleshwar overnight and upon arrival decide to visit the local market. While at a music store, Jai is impressed by Sahil's skill as a guitarist and suggests that he pursue a career as a full-time musician.

Throughout their trip, they argue about their past failure to maintain a relationship. Sahil is irked by Jai's increasingly indifferent behaviour and his workaholic nature. Jai, on the other hand, is disgruntled with Sahil's continuous complaints. One night, Jai makes a pass at Sahil, who is initially hesitant but eventually responds to his advances. The next morning, the two visit the Ghats as Sahil had intended. Sahil takes Jai to an overhanging cliff with a scenic view of Mahabaleshwar, where the two kiss. They later return to a hotel in Mumbai for Jai's scheduled business meeting. At the hotel room, the two admit to their mutual attraction, just before Jai has to leave for his meeting. Sahil interrupts the meeting and embarrasses Jai with a romantic gesture witnessed by everyone present. This leads to a confrontation between the two back in the hotel room, during which Sahil accuses Jai of being scared of coming out. Jai counters by blaming Sahil for not reciprocating his affection from the beginning. The two kiss, but when Sahil tries to pull away, Jai rapes him, only to immediately regret it. Jai apologises and tells Sahil that he need not stay any longer if he doesn't want to. Sahil stays, but refrains from conversing with Jai.

As planned, the two meet Alex (Menon), Sahil's boyfriend, who is accompanied by a friend, Junior (Chaddha). The group discuss their lives over supper, which is cut short by an argument between Alex and Sahil over the former's irresponsible behaviour. The four head back to the hotel room to collect Sahil's belongings, as Jai plans to return to New York later that night. Alex notices the guitar and insists that Sahil play for him; Sahil obliges with an original song. Alex dances with Jai, who is completely smitten by Sahil by this point. Alex offers to take back Sahil's belongings and give the two some more time together. When he leaves, Sahil and Jai embrace, but do not talk about the rape.

At the airport, Jai asks Sahil to leave. He rejects Sahil's efforts at reconciliation, and tells him that they can never be together because they have vastly different lives. When they eventually part ways, Jai writes a text message to Sahil saying he loves him but does not send it. Alex arrives at the airport to pick Sahil up, much to his surprise. He tries to make up for his mistakes by offering Sahil a heartfelt apology as the two drive back to their apartment.

== Cast ==
- Dhruv Ganesh as Sahil
- Shiv Panditt as Jai
- Siddharth Menon as Alex
- Rishabh J. Chaddha as Junior

== Production ==
=== Development ===
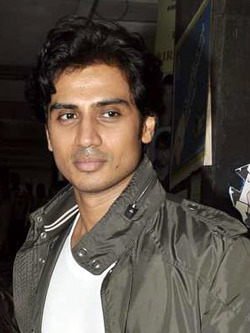
Shiv Panditt (pictured, 2017) came across the film's script during a casual meeting with Sudhanshu Saria.

Loev's script was written by Sudhanshu Saria in the United States when he was working on the screenplay of another film, I Am Here. Describing the film as "small, fragile, honest", Saria said that through his endeavours he "tries to capture the silences and the things unsaid in male friendships". He began working on Loev because he was unable to manage funds for I Am Here. At the time of the script's inception, Saria had no plan of making it into a feature film, as he believed that no investors or actors would want to be associated with a film that he thought would be censored or banned in its home country. The narrative of the production, which is set in Saria's hometown, Mumbai, follows many personal experiences that he himself went through, growing up in the Indian hill town of Darjeeling, and later at the Ithaca Arts College, New York. The dialogue was written in Hinglish, a macaronic hybrid use of English and South Asian languages.

Pre-production work for the film began in February 2014, when Katharina Suckale, Jasleen Marwah, and Arfi Lamba of the Bombay Berlin Film Production showed interest in adapting the script into a full-length feature film. Saria said the screenplay was written out of "deep shame and fear" and on completion was not pitched to any investors, but instead put away into a drawer. The script was picked up by Suckale and Lamba, who agreed to co-produce Saria's directorial debut. The film's title is a deliberate misspelling of the word love, though the two are pronounced identically and are essentially synonyms. The misspelling was explained by Saria in an interview with Gaylaxy: "no matter how different love may look like compared to convention, i.e. no matter how it is spelt, it is still love". The Supreme Court of India's December 2013 decision to reinstate Section 377 of the Indian Penal Code, which criminalised same-sex relationships in India, had a major bearing on Saria's work. In the film's official release statement Saria talked about the environment that he worked in, saying "It was in this India [referring to the Supreme Court judgement] that our actors, technicians, investors and supporters came together to make this film, working in absolute secrecy."

The film stars Shiv Panditt and Dhruv Ganesh; the former came across the film's script during a casual meeting with Saria. In an interview with Daily News and Analysis, Panditt discussed the meeting between him and Saria, saying, "he had no desire to cast me, [...] because he thought I do only commercial films. I had to force it out of him. But when I heard it I found it interesting and we decided to do it". Saria called Ganesh for the table read for the protagonist of the film, Sahil, and was greatly impressed by his approach to the character. Ganesh was apprehensive about playing the character, but after initial scepticism he agreed to play the role. Siddharth Menon and Rishabh J. Chaddha play supporting roles in the film. Loev marked the last film role for Ganesh, as he died of tuberculosis in January 2015, while the film was in post-production. The opening credits in the film's final cut honour his memory.

=== Filming and post-production ===
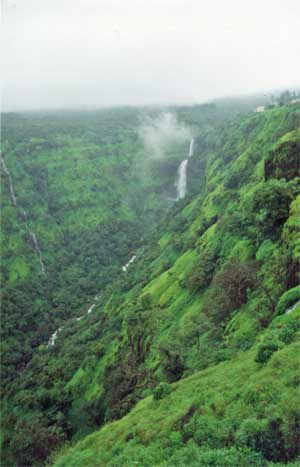
Mahabaleshwar in the Western Ghats, India, was used as the backdrop for the location of the film.

Principal photography began in the summer of 2014 and took place entirely in Mumbai and Mahabaleshwar, a small hilltown in the UNESCO World Heritage site of the Western Ghats, in peninsular India. American Film Institute alumnus Sherri Kauk served as the director of photography for the film. Loev was filmed in a single schedule in a short span of 16 days. Saria said, "We had to plan well, be extremely frugal, count every penny and make sure it all ended up on the screen."

With a modest budget of $1 million, the production of Loev was funded partly by the production partners, and by private equity. A crowdfunding campaign was started on the funding portal Indiegogo, raising an amount of approximately US$4,000. In an interview with Manoj Sharma of Pandolin, a digital film magazine, Lamba talked about the struggle of funding the project saying that the investors had backed out at the last-minute at more than one occasion. The film's crew members financed the project from their own salaries to meet the cost of production.

The filming was done discreetly as Saria feared opposition from the local community towards the film's underlying subject of homosexuality. Among the crew members, only a core group were aware of the details of the plot, and to the rest of the crew it was a road trip film, one identical to Dil Chahta Hai (2001). Crew members were left surprised while filming the scene where Panditt kisses Ganesh in the outdoors as most of them were unaware of any romantic involvement between the two characters. Panditt found the rape scene difficult to shoot, because of the emotional weight it carried: "What I did to overcome my revulsion was to not stand judgment over my character Jai's action. I just went with how Jai reacted to the given situation."

The film editing process began in June 2015; the team of editors was headed by Nitesh Bhatia, and Pritam Das was the sound mixer. Sweta Gupta was the film's art director, and the costumes were by Rohit Chaturvedi. Tony Kakkar provided the soundtrack for the film. An original track recorded by Kakkar, entitled "Ek Chaand", was released as part of the official soundtrack for the film. It was released on 4 May 2017, under the label of Desi Music Factory on iTunes. A two-and-a-half-minute preview of the song was released on YouTube in the same month.

Loev's entire editing and sound mixing process was completed on 25 November, after four months of post-production work. With a total runtime of 92 minutes, the film was pitched under the labels of Bombay Berlin Film Productions and Four Line Films. Its foreign distribution rights were acquired by Loic Magneron's Wide Management, a Paris-based sales-production-distribution house. The deal was finalised after a meeting between Magneron and Saria at the film's Tallinn premiere. However, the distribution rights were withdrawn when the producers entered into negotiations with Netflix. The worldwide rights of the film were acquired by Netflix in April 2017.

== Themes and influences ==
Loev isn't a tale of shantytowns like Slumdog Millionaire and features none of the exotic imagery seen in Gurinder Chadha's Bride and Prejudice. Instead it is a drama that explores the contours of love and friendship [...] Their topics of discussion aren't poverty or religion but romantic and professional fulfillment.

— Steven Borowiec, The Los Angeles Times

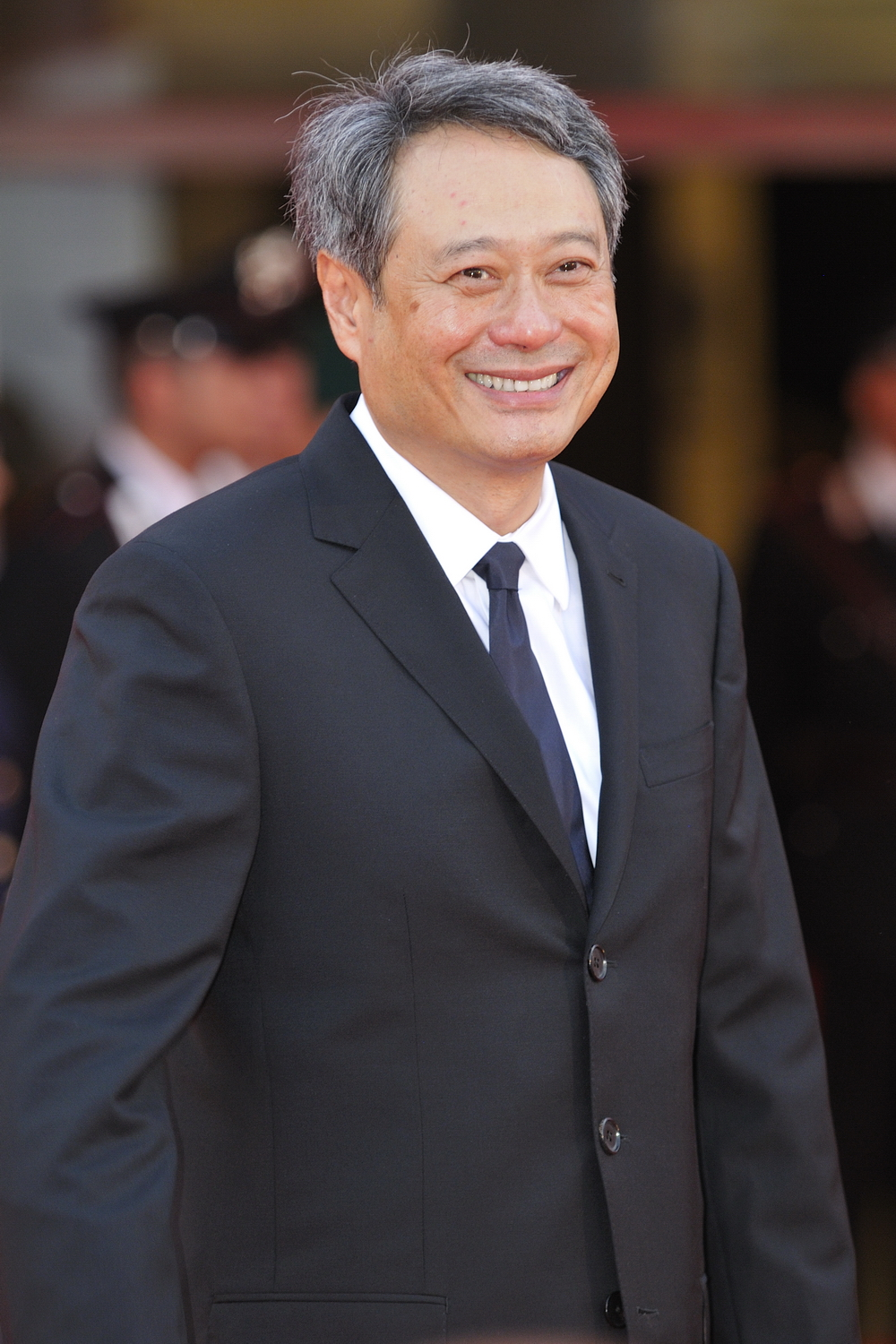
Commentators noted similarities between Loev and Ang Lee's (pictured, 2009) 2005 film Brokeback Mountain.

The themes of unrequited love and self-acceptance are central to Loev as noted by such commentators as Aseem Chhabra, Zack Ford, and Subhash K. Jha. They wrote in their reviews that the theme of sexuality takes a backseat to the aforementioned subjects. Chhabra, a New York-based film writer and director noted that the film beautifully presented an emotional journey of gay characters, who seemed to be comfortable with their identity. Also, as expressed by Saria himself, the film was intended as a "universal story about attraction". He did not want to conform to a single definition for the film or the relationship between two lead characters.

While Vox's Siddharth Naidu thought of the film as politically radical and emotionally raw, Chhabra called it the least bit political in another editorial for Rediff.com. This view was shared by the freelance journalist Steven Borowiec, who wrote that the social context of same-sex relationships in India remained "mostly off-screen". Writing for ThinkProgress, Ford also noted that although the socio-political backdrop "is never explicitly mentioned, it's alluded to throughout". Addressing the same issue, Saria said that Loev is not a political film, but the act of making it was a political one. He said, "[W]hat started out as an intellectual act of protest quickly became something else. Love." Jha believed that it marked "a new beginning for cinema on unconstitutional love in India".

While working in the United States, Saria familiarised himself with independent American cinema, which greatly influenced his work. He also listed such directors as the Dardenne brothers, Éric Rohmer and Hrishikesh Mukherjee as influential during his formative years as a filmmaker. Critics and commentators drew parallels between Loev and Ang Lee's Brokeback Mountain (2005), with some observing the palpable similarity "in the way the rocky terrain is used to define the theme of forbidden love". The film was also thought to be visually and structurally similar to Andrew Haigh's Weekend (2011), and Wong Kar-wai's Happy Together (1997). Ford thought that despite being a lot more subtle in its portrayal of same-sex affection in comparison to Weekend, Loev was still "quite novel for Bollywood".

== Release ==
Loev premiered at the Tallinn Black Nights Film Festival, Estonia on 19 November 2015. The film was then screened at various other film festivals across Europe and Asia, including the Jeonju International Film Festival, South Korea; the Istanbul International Film Festival, Turkey; the Art Film Festival, Slovakia; and the Transilvania International Film Festival, Romania. It had its North American premiere on 12 March, for the "Visions" section at the 2016 South By SouthWest Film Festival. The Tel Aviv International LGBT Film Festival, the BFI Flare: London LGBT Film Festival, and the Frameline Film Festival were among the LGBTQ film festivals that featured the production. The film won the Audience Award for Best Feature Film at the 2016 Tel Aviv International Film Festival.

Upon release in India at the "India Gold" segment of the 2016 Mumbai Film Festival, Loev garnered positive response from critics. It was also screened at the 2016 International Film Festival of Kerala, Thiruvananthapuram. Loev was released on Netflix on 1 May 2017. A new poster was unveiled for the film's Netflix release. Designed by an Indian-based designing house, Pigeon & Co, it featured the two lead actors. Shortly after the film's release, Rajeev Masand hosted Saria on a talk show on News18 and organised a roundtable discussion for the lead actors, Saria, and the film's producers. In May 2017, the film had a special screening in Mumbai, which was attended by the entire cast and crew along with Bollywood personalities such as Richa Chaddha, Kalki Koechlin, Rannvijay Singh, Bejoy Nambiar, Shruti Seth, and Meiyang Chang among others.

== Critical reception ==
=== Domestic ===
Loev received positive response from critics at the Mumbai Film Festival; Manika Verma from the MAMI Young Critics Lab gave a largely positive review calling the film a "breather", and stating that it "doesn't pander and conform to the stereotypes, a trap very easy to fall into." The view was shared by Namrata Joshi of The Hindu, who wrote that the film added a new dimension to gay cinema; she thought the endeavour was "a deceptively simple yet nuanced and heartfelt take on the eternal relationship conundrum." Subhash K. Jha gave the film four stars out of five, defining it not as a gay film but an "unforgettable love story". Applauding the cinematography, direction, and the performances from Ganesh and Panditt, he described the film as one that not only "re-defines love and passion in the context of the Indian reality, it is a new beginning for cinema on unconstitutional love in India." Deepali Singh also praised the film in her review for Daily News and Analysis, with particular emphasis on the cinematography and Ganesh's performance. She thought there were several memorable scenes in the film. Praising the chemistry of the leading cast, Joshi said Panditt was "all solidity and strength", and Ganesh "tenderness and vulnerability".

=== International ===
A wistful, meandering gay love story, Loev is very unsensational by the standards of LGBT cinema produced elsewhere in the world. But in India, where homosexuality is punishable by law, this gentle film is quietly revolutionary.

— Wendy Ide, Screen International

Loev garnered praise from critics at many film festivals; commentators were largely laudatory of both the film's sensitive treatment of a homosexuality theme and the performances of the cast. Reviewing the film at Tallinn Black Nights Film Festival, Shelagh Rowan-Legg of Screen Anarchy praised the refreshing concept of the film, different from the usual cinema associated with India: "Loev examines the personal and the political, [...] in a sensitive yet open portrait of love and sexuality." Rowan-Legg further called the cast "tailor-made", lauding Panditt in particular and saying, "Pandit perfectly times the slow release of his frustration, [...] is both appalling and believable." Although finding Ganesh to be "a charismatic presence on screen", Screen International's Wendy Ide – otherwise impressed with the cast's performances – stated, "naturalistic acting style notwithstanding, there is something not entirely persuasive about the relationship between Jai and Sahil."

Loev was well received in North America. Its screening was the first time an Indian film was shown at the South by Southwest Film Festival; Brooke Corso of The Macguffin remarked that the beautiful and heartbreaking film shines when "it focuses on what is said when the characters aren't speaking, and what is avoided when they do." Matt Shiverdecker of Austin American-Statesman was largely laudatory of the production at the same event as well, dubbing it as a "small miracle". He praised the film's realism, and attributed its success to the actors and to the beautiful scenery. Siddhant Adlakha of Birth Movies Death called Loev a "minuscule film of miraculous construction" and "a melancholy tale where questions have no easy answers, [...] but one where bliss, even momentary, feels infinite."

== Awards and nominations ==
Year	Award	Category	Recipient and nominee	Result	Ref.
2015	Tallinn Black Nights Film Festival	Tridents Award (First Feature)	Loev	Nominated	
2016	Guadalajara International Film Festival	Best Feature Film	Loev	Nominated	
2016	Frameline Film Festival	Best Feature (Jury)	Loev	Nominated	
2016	Frameline Film Festival	AT&T Audience Award	Loev	Won	
2016	SXSW Film Festival	Visions (Audience Award)	Loev	Nominated	
2016	Tel Aviv Film Festival	Audience Award – Best Feature	Loev	Won	
