= En Kaadhali Scene Podura =

2019 Indian comedy film by Ram Sevaa

- Theatrical release poster
- Directed by: Ram Sevaa
- Produced by: Joseph Baby
- Starring: Mahesh; Shalu Chourasiya
- Cinematography: Venkat
- Edited by: A. Marish
- Music by: Amresh Ganesh
- Production company: Shankar Movies International
- Release date: 13 September 2019
- Country: India
- Language: Tamil

En Kaadhali Scene Podura (transl. My girlfriend is making a scene) is a 2019 Indian Tamil-language romantic comedy film directed by Ram Sevaa. It stars Mahesh and Shalu Chourasiya alongside an ensemble cast. Featuring music composed by Amresh Ganesh, the film began and ended production in 2018 and was released on 13 September 2019.

== Cast ==
- Mahesh as Karthi
- Shalu Chourasiya
- Aadukalam Naren
- Manobala
- Ambani Shankar
- Gokulnath
- Diya
- Thennavan
- Vaiyapuri
- Sandy in a special appearance

== Production ==
The film featuring Mahesh and debutant Shalu Chourasiya was shot in early 2018, with director Ram Sevaa making his second film after the unreleased Tea Kadai Bench. The director based the story of the film on a real life incident that he had witnessed in the 1990s, and completed the shoot of the film within 23 days.

== Soundtrack ==
The soundtrack was composed by Amresh Ganesh. Prior to the film's release, Mahesh highlighted the music as a major selling point of the film.

Track listing
No.	Title	Singer(s)	Length
1.	"Bro Bro"	Amresh Ganesh
2.	"Chella Nilavey"	Sharath Santhosh
3.	"Nilla Kallula"	Senthil Ganesh, Rajalakshmi
4.	"Scene Podura"	Krish

== Critical reception ==
Aneruth Rengarajen of Cinema Express gave a negative review and wrote that the film was "a mess of a movie that does not know what it wants to be". Maalai Malar praised the music but criticised the cinematography.
