= Iravum Pagalum Varum =

2015 Indian film by Bala Sriram

- Theatrical release poster
- Directed by: Bala Sriram
- Written by: Bala Sriram
- Produced by: Balasubramaniam Periyasamy
- Starring: Mahesh; Ananya; Jagan
- Cinematography: E. Krishnasamy
- Edited by: V. T. Vijayan; N. Ganesh Kumar
- Music by: Dhina
- Production company: Sky Dot Films
- Release date: 20 March 2015
- Country: India
- Language: Tamil

Iravum Pagalum Varum (transl. Night and day will come), also known by the initialism IPV, is a 2015 Indian Tamil-language heist film written and directed by Bala Sriram in his directorial debut. It stars Mahesh, Ananya, and Jagan, while A. Venkatesh, Sanjana Singh, Yuvarani, and Swaminathan play supporting roles. The music was composed by Dhina with cinematography by E. Krishnasamy. The film was released on 20 March 2015.

== Plot ==
Karthi is a college student who engages in petty thievery. When arrested, he reveals that he does it to cover his personal costs. This involves him in the business of a ruthless and dishonest police officer who operates his own gang of criminals.

== Cast ==
- Mahesh as Karthi
- Ananya as Sona
- Jagan as Karthi's friend
- A. Venkatesh
- Sanjana Singh as Hamsa
- Yuvarani
- Swaminathan
- Shakeela
- Rail Ravi

== Production ==
Iravum Pagalum Varum is the directorial debut of Bala Sriram and was produced by Balasubramaniam Periyasamy. Cinematography was handled by E. Krishnasamy, and the music was composed by Dhina and lyrics written by Lalithanand.

== Critical reception ==
Malini Mannath of The New Indian Express said that the film, "despite the director's effort to present a freshness in its screenplay and narration, fails to touch a chord". She called it "a case of good intention gone haywire." Maalai Malar and Dinamalar also gave the film negative reviews.
