= His Wife (2014 film) =

2014 French film

- Poster
- Directed by: Michel Spinosa
- Written by: Agnes de Sacy; Michel Spinosa
- Produced by: Patrick Sobelman; Suresh Balaje
- Starring: Yvan Attal; Janagi; Charlotte Gainsbourg
- Cinematography: Rakesh Haridas
- Edited by: Ewin Ryckaert
- Music by: Sigfried
- Production companies: Diaphana Films (France) ex nihilo Artémis Productions; Wide Angle Productions; France 3 Cinéma
- Distributed by: Canal Plus; Cine Plus; Indefilms; La Banque Postale Image 6
- Release dates: 7 February 2014 (Berlin International Film Festival); 12 March 2014
- Running time: 108 minutes
- Countries: France; India; Belgium
- Languages: French; Tamil; English

His Wife (French: Son épouse) is a 2014 French psychological drama film directed by Michel Spinosa and starring Yvan Attal, newcomer Janagi and Charlotte Gainsbourg.

== Plot ==
After Joseph's wife Catherine dies, he goes to a village near Pondicherry where he meets Gracie, who may be possessed by Catherine's spirit.

== Cast ==
- Yvan Attal as Joseph de Rosa
- Janagi as Gracie
- Charlotte Gainsbourg as Catherine de Rosa
- Mahesh as Anthony
- Laguparan as Gracie's brother
- Corentin Lobet as police officer
- Nirupama Nityanadan as Nandini
- Janakiraman Jayakumar as Dr. Anand
- Murugan Perasamy as Siluvai
- Chandra as Gracie's mother
- Durga as Gracie's sister
- Jayasurya as Gracie's father
- Jeroen Perceval as Dieter
- Elango Kumaravel as Father Godwin
- Munnar Ramesh as Bus conductor

== Production ==
Janagi, from a village near Nagercoil, India, made her film debut.

== Release ==
The film premiered at the Berlin International Film Festival on 7 February 2014, after which it was released in France on 12 March 2014. His Wife was given a limited theatrical release in the United States on 27 February 2014.

== Reception ==
Jordan Mintzer of The Hollywood Reporter wrote that the film is "an audacious and often impressive continent-hopping drama" and added that the film is "marked by an impressive sense of visual storytelling". Ronnie Scheib of Variety opined that "Skillful time shuffling and a compelling performance by Charlotte Gainsbourg anchor this flawed but fascinating cross-cultural drama". Jacques Mandelbaum of Le Monde stated that the film does not rise to the expected level.
