= Mahesh (Tamil actor) =

Indian actor (born 1990)

- Born: Chinnalapatti, Dindigul, India
- Occupation: Actor
- Years active: 2010–present

Mahesh is an Indian actor who has appeared in Tamil language films. He is best known for his debut in the 2010 film, Angadi Theru, directed by Vasanthabalan.

== Career ==
Mahesh was spotted by Vasanthabalan's assistants while playing for his school in a volleyball match in Tirunelveli and the director's team asked him to audition for a role in Angadi Theru. Despite rejecting their advances initially, he eventually agreed to join the team after finishing his board examinations and after being encouraged by his sports mentor to pursue a career in films. The film subsequently released in March 2010 to positive reviews, with Mahesh's performance being well received by critics.

However, since Angadi Theru, Mahesh has only been seen in low-budget films with his immediate release Konjam Siripu Konjam Kobam (2011) taking a low key box office opening to poor reviews, while Yasakhan met with a similar fate. In 2014, he played the fiancé of Janagi in the French film Son épouse, which was set in Tamil Nadu. In 2015, he appeared in two further unnoticed films which had delayed releases, Iravum Pagalum Varum alongside Ananya and Buddhanin Sirippu, co-starring Mithra Kurian and Samuthirakani.

== Filmography ==
Year	Film	Role	Notes
2010	Angadi Theru	Jyothi Lingam	Nominated, Vijay Award for Best Debut Actor
2011	Konjam Sirippu Konjam Kobam	Velu	
2012	Last Bench	Rejimon	Malayalam film
2014	His Wife	Anthony	
2014	Yasakhan	Surya	
2014	Velmurugan Borewells	Ramesh	
2015	Iravum Pagalum Varum	Karthi	
2015	Buddhanin Sirippu	Kathir	
2017	Neerajanam		Telugu film
2019	En Kaadhali Scene Podura	Karthi	
2020	Karuppu Aadu		
2021	Veerapuram 220		
2022	Vattakara	Tharun	
2023	Angaaragan	Siva	
2024	Thimil		
2025	Thadai Athai Udai	Sivan	
