= Ner Ethir =

- Theatrical release poster
- Directed by: M. Jayapradeep
- Written by: M. Jayapradeep
- Starring: Parthy; Richard; Vidhya Mohan
- Cinematography: Rasamathi
- Edited by: Gopi Krishna
- Music by: Satish Chakravarthy
- Production company: The Movie House Entertainment
- Distributed by: V. Creations
- Release date: 24 January 2014
- Running time: 105 minutes
- Country: India
- Language: Tamil

Ner Ethir (transl. The exact opposite) is a 2014 Indian Tamil-language thriller film directed by M. Jayapradeep. The film stars Parthy, Richard, and Vidhya Mohan, while Harish Siva, Aishwarya Menon, and M. S. Bhaskar play supporting roles. The music was composed by Satish Chakravarthy with cinematography by Rasamathi and editing by Gopi Krishna. The film was released on 24 January 2014. It is a remake of Across the Hall (2009).

== Plot ==
Karthik gets a call from his friend Kathir, who tells him that earlier that day, he received a call that his fiancée Isha had cancelled her flight. Kathir followed her and discovered that she had checked into a local hotel, after which Kathir rents out the room across the hall from Isha, believing that she is cheating on him. Kathir explains to Karthik that earlier that evening, he had gone to Karthik's house, and finding him not home, broke in and stole Karthik's gun. Worried that Kathir is about to kill someone, Karthik tries to reason with Kathir on the phone not to do anything, but after having no success, he tells Kathir to stay where he is and wait until he meets him at the hotel in about 20 minutes. During the film, it is revealed that Isha cancelled her flight because of Karthik and that they were cheating behind Kathir's back. Kathir finds this out when he kills Isha and tries to call Karthik, whose cell phone was still in the hotel room that Isha and Karthik cheated in. Kathir tricks Karthik into helping move Isha and frames him for killing her while the police storm the hotel.

== Cast ==
- Parthy as Kathir
- Richard as Karthik
- Vidhya Mohan as Isha
- Harish Siva as Kathiresan
- Aishwarya Menon as Nethra
- M. S. Bhaskar as S. Neeraavi
- L. P. Thiagarajan as Playboy
- Halwa Vasu
- Govind
- Velmurugan
- Manohar
- Kausha Rach as item number

== Production ==
The film began production in late March 2013 under the title Woo, directed by Jayapradeep, an associate of director Keyaar. In April 2013, the team discussed filming a romantic song in Norway and Switzerland, citing that schedules had already taken place on a set worth ₹75 lakh (equivalent to ₹1.4 crore or US$140,000 in 2026).

By late 2013, Kalaipuli S. Thanu had acquired the film's worldwide distribution rights. A month later, he revealed that all profits from the film would be distributed to the welfare of the needy in the film industry. Thanu also revealed he discussed potential Telugu and Hindi remake versions of the film with Gautham Vasudev Menon.

== Soundtrack ==
The music was composed by Satish Chakravarthy, who also wrote the lyrics.

Song	Singers
"En Kadhale En Kadhale"	Shreya Ghoshal, Satish Chakravarthy
"Ini Naan Mohini (Latchumi)"	London Harshi, Satish Chakravarthy, Kamala Kannan
"Kanmani Nee illaiyel"	Haricharan, Satish Chakravarthy
"Stars Jolikka Vendum"	Neeti Mohan, JayaPradeep
"Yaarival Yaarival Yaaro (Thiruda Thiruda)	Neeti Mohan, Satish Chakravarthy

== Reception ==
M. Suganth of The Times of India gave the film 1.5/5 stars and wrote, "The performances and the filmmaking are so flat that you never really invest in these characters. The drawn-out nature of the scenes and the irritating comedy track only make things worse". Sify noted the film's similarities to Across the Hall (2009) and wrote, "The performance by the lead actors is wooden and direction is tedious though the film is only 105 minutes".
