= Thadai Athai Udai =

- Theatrical release poster
- Directed by: Arivazhakan Murugesan
- Written by: Arivazhakan Murugesan
- Produced by: Arivazhagan Murugesan
- Starring: Mahesh; Guna Babu; K. M. Pari Vallal; Thiruvarur Ganesh; Mahaadeer Mohammed
- Cinematography: Thangapandian; Chhota Manikandan
- Edited by: Doyce B. M.
- Music by: Sai Sundar
- Production company: Gandhimathi Pictures
- Release date: 31 October 2025
- Running time: 129 minutes
- Country: India
- Language: Tamil

Thadai Athai Udai (transl. Break the Barrier) is a 2025 Indian Tamil-language film written, produced and directed by Arivazhakan Murugesan. The film stars Mahesh, Guna Babu, K. M. Pari Vallal, Thiruvarur Ganesh and Mahaadeer Mohammed. It was released on 31 October 2025.

== Cast ==
- Mahesh
- Guna Babu
- K. M. Pari Vallal
- Thiruvarur Ganesh
- Mahaadeer Mohammed
- K. M. Barivallal
- Velmurugan
- Gowthami
- M. K. Radhakrishnan
- M. R. Nagaraj
- Ambal Sathish
- Delta Veera
- Subasri
- Suryaprathaban
- Sanjai

== Production ==
Arivazhakan Murugesan revealed that the film is based on a true incident before 1990 about a man who was a slave in a silk factory but fought and achieved education for his family, and how social media influences education and politics both directly and indirectly.

== Soundtrack ==
The music was composed by Sai Sundar with lyrics by Arivazhakan Murugesan.

Track listing
No.	Title	Singer(s)	Length
1.	"Muyantrey Vizhuvom"	Sarvesh, Rajiv Gandhi	5:53
2.	"En Muthal Thalaivaa"	Ramesh Kaliyaperumal, Jagathish MJ, John Jerome	4:00
3.	"TN 49"	Chinnaponnu, Kaalidasan, Varun, Surya Devan	4:10
Total length:			14:03

== Release and reception ==
Thadai Athai Udai was released on 31 October 2025. Maalai Malar appreciated the performances of the cast members, especially Mahesh, but felt the director could have moved the story in different angles and handled the characters in a more appropriate manner, and Sai Sundar's music could have been better. Dina Thanthi appreciated the cinematography but was mildly critical of the music, adding that while the film's biggest strength was in the realistic scenes that portray social problems, the weakness was in the dramatic scenes.
