= Mansukhbhai Kothari =

Indian businessman and industrialist

Sri Mansukh Lal Mahadev Bhai Kothari also commonly known as Mansukhbhai Kothari (25 July 1925 – 27 November 2015) was an Indian businessman and industrialist. He was the founder of Kothari Group of Industries. He was famously dubbed by media as the "father of pan masala industry".

== Biography ==
Mansukhbhai was born on 25 July 1925 at a village in Narali district, in the state of Gujarat. He eventually relocated to Kanpur at the age of 16 and he immediately joined the fray to enter the business field.

== Career ==
Mansukhbhai had involved in supply of coconut oil to shops for a brief stint. He kickstarted Kothari Industries in 1973 by establishing the headquarters at Kanpur. During his tenure as the chairman of Kothari Group, mouth freshner brand Pan Parag was unveiled in the market in 1973.

Mansukhbhai brought on board Bollywood actors Shammi Kapoor and Ashok Kumar for the television commercial advertisement promoting his flagship brand Pan Parag, and the brand’s tagline, “Baraatiyon ka swagat Pan Parag se kijiye," became a popular marketing tactic. Kanpur also apparently came to be known as “pan masala city" when Mansukhbhai chose Kanpur as the base to carry out paan masala business under the brand name Pan Parag.

He also received support from his sons Vikram Kothari and Deepak Kothari and the Pan Parag group was diversified eventually laying foundation to the formation of Rotomac Pen which was founded by Vikram Kothari in 1999. He founded the Kothari International School in 2005. In 2010, he stepped down from the role as chairman of the Kothari Group of Industries owing to deteriorating health issues.

== Legacy ==
However, his flagship brand, Pan Parag, raised significant health concerns among medical health experts across India who had denounced the usage of such a brand by highlighting the side effects caused by consistent chewing of tobacco and Pan masala.

== Death ==
He died on 27 November 2015 at his residence in Tilak Nagar, Kanpur. He was 90 years old during the time of his death.
