= Yasakhan =

2014 Indian film by Thuraivanan

- Release poster
- Directed by: Thuraivanan
- Produced by: Santhosh Pandian
- Starring: Mahesh; Niranjana; Janaki
- Music by: Satish Chakravarthy
- Release date: 21 March 2014
- Country: India
- Language: Tamil

Yasakhan is a 2014 Indian Tamil-language romantic drama film directed by Thuraivanan. The film stars Mahesh, Niranjana, and Janaki. It is about a man from Madurai who is rejected by society.

== Cast ==
- Mahesh as Surya
- Niranjana as Shalini
- Janaki as Sharadha
- Jayachandran
- Samuel Chandran

== Production ==
The film began production under the title Sithan. Niranjana from Kerala was cast as the lead actress.

== Soundtrack ==
Music by Satish Chakravarthy.

- 'Kannadi Maname' – Haricharan (lyrics by Arivumathi)
- ‘Poo Poothathum Nee Parthathum – Bela Shende (lyrics by Yugabharathi)
- ‘Senthazham Poove' – Gayathri and Kunal Kanjavala (lyrics by Yugabharathi)
- 'Urangi Kidakkum Madurakulla' – Mukesh and Aasha (lyrics by Gangai Amaren)
- 'Eendra Undhan Nenjathil' – Sathish Chakravarthy (also lyrics)

== Reception ==
M. Suganth of The Times of India opined that "We get a longwinded lecture on being human and helping others and for a moment, we think we are not in a movie theatre but in a seminar hall". Baradwaj Rangan wrote for The Hindu, "The characters are underdeveloped. The scenes have no punch. There’s not one believable moment". A critic from Maalai Malar called the film different. Malini Mannath of The New Indian Express wrote, "With a screenplay that is loosely etched, incidents lacking any depth and jumpy narration, there are hardly any scenes to keep you hooked".
