= Chitti Potti =

Indian drama film

- Theatrical release poster
- Directed by: Bhaskar Yadav Dasari
- Written by: Bhaskar Yadav Dasari
- Produced by: Bhaskar Yadav Dasari
- Starring: Ram Mittakanti, Pavithra, Kashvi, Kanthamma, Achari, Harsha, Satish, Sarala
- Cinematography: Malhar Bat Jhosi
- Edited by: Balakrishna Boya
- Music by: Sri Venkat
- Production company: Bhaskara Group of Media
- Release date: 3 October 2024
- Country: India
- Language: Telugu

Chitti Potti is a 2024 Telugu-language drama film directed and produced by Bhaskar Yadav Dasari under the banner of Bhaskara Group of Media. The film explores the emotional depth of sibling bonds and family relationships, spanning three generations. The cast includes Pavithra, Ram Mittakanti, Kashvi, Kanthamma, Achari, Harsha, Satish, and Sarala.

== Plot ==
Chitti Potti revolves around Chitti (played by Pavithra), an intelligent and innocent young woman preparing to marry her love, Vicky. However, unforeseen events put their marriage at risk, testing the resilience and unity of her family.

== Cast ==
- Ram Mittakanti
- Pavithra as Chitti
- Kashvi
- Kanthamma
- Achari
- Harsha
- Satish
- Sarala

== Production ==
Chitti Potti was directed and produced by Bhaskar Yadav Dasari, who aimed to create a heartfelt narrative about the significance of sibling relationships. Sri Venkat composed the film’s music. The film's visual narrative was shaped by the cinematography of Malhar Bat Jhosi, while Balakrishna Boya handled the editing

== Soundtrack ==
The soundtrack of Chitti Potti is composed by Sri Venkat, featuring a blend of melodic and soulful tracks, and the film contains 5 songs and lyrics for all of them were, penned by Bhaskar Yadav Dasari.

=== Track listing ===
No.	Title	Lyrics	Singer(s)	Length
1.	"Chitti Potti Chitti Potti"	Bhaskar Yadav Dasari	Vijay Yesudas, Narayana Nayar	4:47
2.	"Marichipokammaa"	Bhaskar Yadav Dasari	Harini Ivaturi	4:50
3.	"Seemantham"	Bhaskar Yadav Dasari	Kanakavva, Saisharan	4:07
4.	"Biyyaa Biyyaa (Banjara Song)"	Bhaskar Yadav Dasari	Rohini	3:09
5.	"Endayyo Ee Gaali"	Bhaskar Yadav Dasari	Kaushal.R, Naga Pratyusha	3:37
Total length:				21:32

== Release and reception ==
Chitti Potti was theatrically released on 3 October 2024. Hindustan Times and Zee News both rated the film 2.5/5.
