= Rotomac Global =

Indian manufacturer

Rotomac Global Pvt Ltd is an Indian private limited company which predominantly engages in manufacturing pens. In 2018, the company became the center of attention after being scrutinized for its role in defaulting large sums of money, resulting in non-performing advances causing the deterioration of the quality of assets in the Indian banking sector. Rotomac approached seven Indian banks to obtain documentary credit facilities ranging from INR 200 crore to 3,695 crore within the time duration beginning from 2008 until 2013.

== Corporate history ==
The company was founded initially as Rotomac Pen in 1992. The foundation for Rotomac Pen was laid following the success of paan masala business conducted by businessman Mansukhbhai Kothari as he managed business operations under the brand name Pan Parag. He also received support from his sons Vikram Kothari and Deepak Kothari and the Pan Parag group was diversified eventually laying foundation to the formation of Rotomac Pen.

In 1999, Vikram and his brother Deepak decided to separate from each other. Vikram took over the ownership of Rotomac Pen Pvt Ltd while Deepak decided to continue his father's paan masala business. Rotomac Pen started manufacturing pens on a large scale and it quickly emerged as a market leader in writing instruments market. Rotomac incorporated a promotional tag line "likhtey, likhtey, love ho jaaye" and it also hired prominent Bollywood actors Salman Khan and Raveena Tandon as the official brand ambassadors. The company was later rebranded as Rotomac Global Pvt Ltd with the advent of Vikram Kothari's expansion strategies by venturing into real estate, steel and infrastructure.

== Controversies ==
The company was embroiled in controversies pertaining to the misappropriation of funds when settling payment obligations to buyers and sellers, while it was also allegedly called out for engaging in market manipulation tactics. In February 2018, an FIR was filed at Central Bureau of Investigation by Bank of Baroda against Rotomac Global after one of its directors, Vikram Kothari, was found guilty of willfully defaulting on a whopping amount of INR 3,695 crore. It was identified by the CBI officials that such large sums of money had been raised from a group lending initiative (loan syndication) by a group of banks. The funds obtained from a consortium of 7 banks, including the Bank of India, Bank of Baroda, Indian Overseas Bank, United Bank of India, Bank of Maharashtra, Allahabad Bank, and Oriental Bank of Commerce, via a letter of credit facility, in order to settle payments from buyers and suppliers in order to execute export orders, were later revealed to have been diverted to the business accounts of Rotomac and to the offshore accounts. The senior CBI officials, who took firm control of the legal proceedings of the case, insisted that Rotomac Global and its promoter Vikram Kothari had violated the Foreign Exchange Management Act guidelines.

Rotomac promoter Vikram Kothari obtained a slew of foreign letters of credit in order to facilitate payment arrangements to his buyers and suppliers abroad as part of Rotomac's international trade requirements. The company had submitted forged documents to the respective banks for the conduct of its trading activities and about 11 letters of credit had been issued in favour of two beneficiaries namely Fareast Distributors & Logistic P Ltd and RBA Venture Ltd. Rotomac allegedly failed to comply with documentary evidence and it raised concerns from the banks about the authenticity of the trade vessel and voyages used for the trading activities as mentioned in the bill of lading. The company also subsequently failed to meet debt obligations for the loans it borrowed from seven banks. The company was penalised by CBI under the Indian Penal Code sections including criminal conspiracy (120-B) and cheating offenses (420), in addition to the provisions under the Prevention of Corruption Act, 1988. The Enforcement Directorate also registered a money laundering case against Kothari and his family members under the provisions of the Prevention of Money Laundering Act to ascertain whether Kothari and his family members disguised the true origins of the money received from banks by purposefully navigating the funds to various offshore accounts in order to create illegal assets and black money.

On 8 December 2018, Rotomac's manufacturing unit in Kanpur winded up its operations due to the unpaid liabilities to the consortium of banks and the CBI investigations against the directors of the company. The employment contracts of the employees who had been employed at the manufacturing unit of Rotomac were also terminated with immediate effect.
