= Sudhanshu Saria =

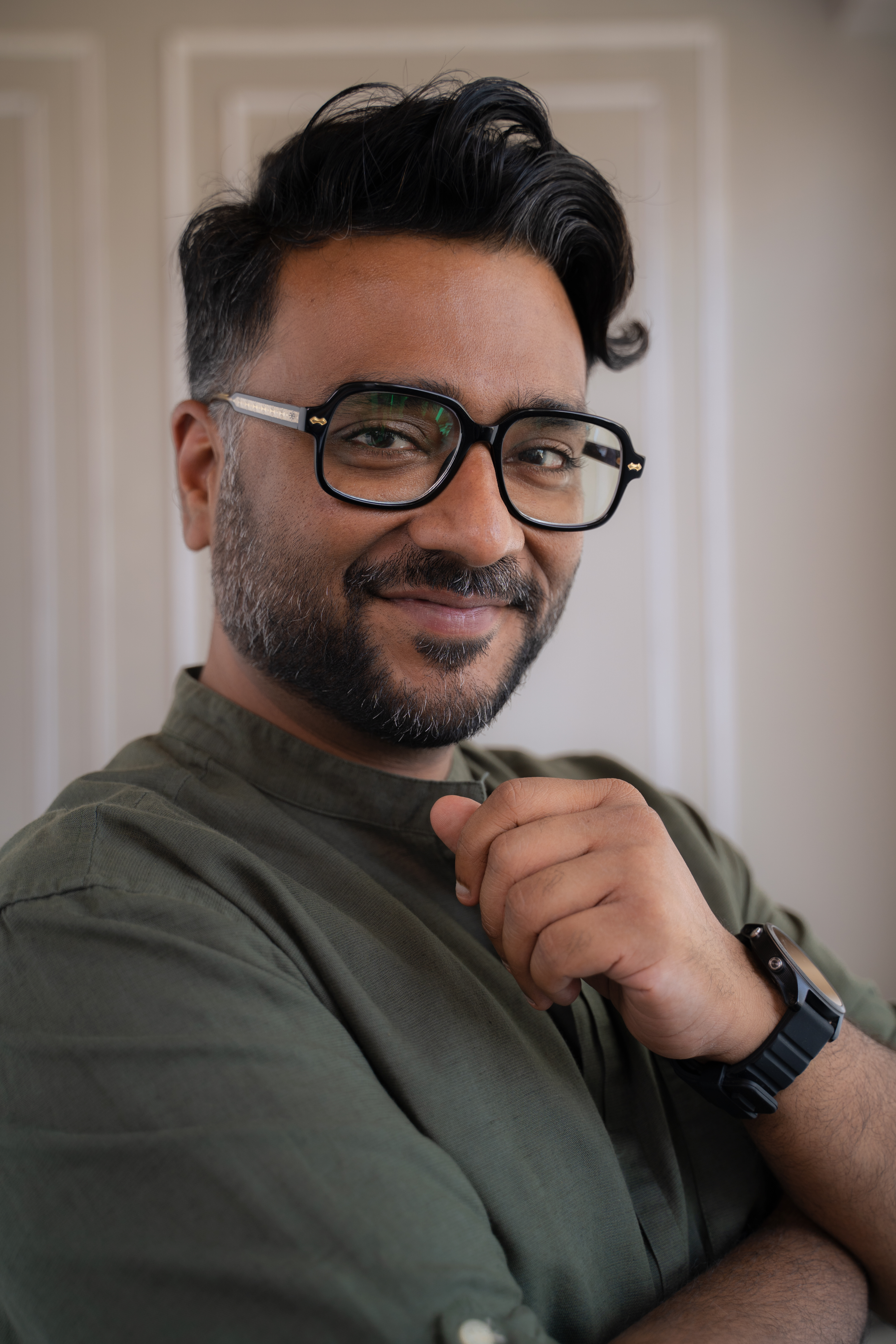
- Born: Darjeeling, India
- Education: Ithaca College, The Doon School
- Occupations: Screenwriter; film director; producer

Sudhanshu Saria is an Indian filmmaker. Hailing from the Gopaldhara Tea Estate family, he was born in the tea estates of Darjeeling, studied at The Doon School and graduated from Ithaca College in New York, with a degree in Bachelor of Fine Arts in Film and Photography. He made his directorial debut with the 2015 romantic drama Loev. Saria won a National Film Award for directing the short film Knock Knock Knock. He is also known for directing and co-writing the high octane espionage drama ULAJH and for showrunning, co-writing and co-directing the young adult series on Amazon Prime Video, Big Girls Don't Cry.

== Career ==
Early in his career, Saria served as a development and acquisitions executive for various companies including ThinkFilm, New Films International and Peace Arch Entertainment, where he was tasked with acquiring and developing projects for the companies to finance and distribute. Saria founded his own production house, Four Line Films.

Saria's short film, entitled His New Hands, had its world premiere in competition at the 2014 Hong Kong International Film Festival, and was awarded the prestigious Remi Gold Prize for Best Dramatic Short at the WorldFest-Houston International Film Festival and the Best Film prize at Flyway Film Festival. The film screened at more than twenty-five film festivals around the world including Sarasota Film Festival, Omaha Film Festival and the Oscar qualifying Heartland Film Festival. It was selected by the makers of the RED camera for its annual showcase of the best films shot on this device, and awarded the Best Cinematography prize at the Kala Ghoda Arts Festival in Mumbai.

Saria's feature film directorial debut, Loev, an indie road film for which he also served as the screenwriter, premiered in the First Feature competition at the Tallinn Black Nights Film Festival and has been selected at prestigious festivals all around the world including SXSW, Guadalajara International Film Festival, Frameline Film Festival, Jeonju International Film Festival, Inside Out Film and Video Festival and BFI Flare: London LGBT Film Festival Film Festivals. In India, the film had its premiere in the India Gold competition section at MAMI Mumbai Film Festival and then at the International Film Festival of Kerala. The film has received rave reviews and secured theatrical distribution in key territories around the world. It also won the Audience Award for Best Film at the TLVFest, the LGBT International Film Festival in Tel Aviv. The film was produced by Saria in partnership with Bombay Berlin Film Productions. The film was acquired by Netflix for an exclusive worldwide release and debuted on their platform on 1 May 2017.

Saria's second feature-length screenplay, I Am Here, was selected for the International Film Finance Forum at the Toronto International Film Festival, and was acquired by Cinestaan Film Company.

Saria's next was Knock Knock Knock, a psychological thriller set in Darjeeling. The film world premiered as one of five shorts selected from around the world in the Shorts Showcase of the 2019 Busan International Film Festival. The film had its European premiere at the 2019 Tallinn Black Nights Film Festival in their Homecoming section alongside new films by Peter Strickland and Yorgos Lanthimos. The film won the Remi-Gold for Best Live Action Short at WorldFest Houston and the Best Screenplay award at the New York Indian Film Festival. The film had its India premiere at Dharamsala International Film Festival and has been traveling to various cities around the world. He wrote, directed and edited the film besides producing it in partnership with California Studios. The film was acquired by MUBI and premiered on their platform in September 2020. The film was picked by Platform Magazine in its annual Best of 2020 list. It was also included in Juggernaut's list of the Best South Asian films of the year, and in 2021 it won the best non-feature direction award at the 67th National Film Awards.

Saria is currently in post-production on Sanaa, a feature film starring Radhika Madan, Shikha Talsania, Sohum Shah and Pooja Bhatt in lead parts. Besides writing and directing the film, Saria is also producing the feature under his production house Four Line Films. In 2023, Saria's Four Line Entertainment partnered with KASHISH Arts Foundation and Lotus Visual Production to produce Arvind Caulagi's queer romantic drama Taps.

Saria served on the juries for the First Features and the Estonian Film competition sections of the 20th Tallinn Black Nights Film Festival. He has also served on various panels focused on film production and distribution, including Blackberry's panel on crowdfunding at the Toronto International Film Festival and The State of Diversity in Independent Film at SXSW. He also lectured in an online masterclass on The Art of Pitching for the Mumbai Film Festival.

Most recently, he served as the Showrunner on Big Girls Don't Cry, a young-adult drama series for Amazon Prime which was released on the platform to positive reviews. He wrote the pilot and finale episodes and also directed the final two episodes of the season.

His most recent film is Ulajh, an espionage thriller he co-wrote and directed for Junglee Pictures that stars Janhvi Kapoor, Gulshan Devaiah, Roshan Mathew, Rajesh Tailang, Meiyang Chang, Jitendra Joshi and Adil Hussain in principal parts. The film was released in theatres worldwide on August 2, 2024 and debuted on Netflix the following month. He also wrote the lyrics of two songs on the album -- Aaja Oye and Jao ji Jao.

== Filmography ==
=== Films ===
Year	Title	Functioned As			Notes
Year	Title	Director	Writer	Producer	Notes
2015	Loev	Yes	Yes	Yes	
2023	Sanaa	Yes	Yes	Yes	
2024	Article 370	No	No	No	Written lyrics for song "Main Hoon"
2024	Ulajh	Yes	Yes	No	

=== Short films ===
Year	Title	Functioned As			Notes
Year	Title	Director	Writer	Producer	Notes
2010	A Tight Spot	Yes	Yes	Yes	
2013	His New Hands	Yes	Yes	Yes	
2020	Knock Knock Knock	Yes	Yes	Yes	Also editor
2023	Taps	No	No	Yes	

=== Television ===
Year	Title	Functioned As			Notes
Year	Title	Director	Writer	Executive producer	Notes
2024	Big Girls Don't Cry	Yes	Yes	Yes	2 episodes
