= Satish Chakravarthy =

Indian music composer

Satish Chakrvarathy
- Born: Chennai, Tamil Nadu, India
- Genres: Film score, hip hop
- Occupations: Film composer, music director
- Years active: 2002; 2009–present

Satish Chakravarthy is an Indian composer, who mainly produces film scores and soundtracks in the Tamil film industry. He composed music for the films, Leelai and Kanimozhi.

== Career ==
Satish Chakravarthy graduated from the National Institute of Technology, Tiruchirappalli as an engineer, and then attended Berklee College of Music in Massachusetts where he worked with A. R. Rahman beginning in 2006 on several films as a musician. He then began a music career composing Leelai.

He was approached by T. Siva, a close family friend, to compose for Kanimozhi. Siva's first production had music scored by Satish's father.

== Discography ==
As composer and playback singer

Year	Film	Language	Notes
2009	Leelai	Tamil	
2010	Kanimozhi	Tamil	
2013	Yasakhan	Tamil	
2014	Neelam	Tamil	
2014	Ner Ethir	Tamil	
2014	Maza Agadbam	Marathi	

As playback singer

- Jaane Tu... Ya Jaane Na (2008)

== Filmography ==
As lyricist

- Mitr, My Friend (2002) (English)
- Leelai (2012)
- Yasakhan (2013)
- Ner Ethir (2014)
