= Kanimozhi (film) =

- Theatrical release poster
- Directed by: Sripathy Rangasamy
- Written by: Sripathy Rangasamy
- Produced by: T. Siva; Sona Heiden
- Starring: Jai; Shazahn Padamsee; Vijay Vasanth
- Cinematography: P. Chidamparam
- Edited by: Praveen K. L.; N. B. Srikanth
- Music by: Satish Chakravarthy
- Production companies: Amma Creations; Uniq Productions
- Release date: 26 November 2010
- Running time: 115 minutes
- Country: India
- Language: Tamil
- Budget: ₹30 million

Kanimozhi (transl. Sweet language) is a 2010 Indian Tamil-language romantic musical film directed and written by Sripathi Rangasamy and jointly produced by T. Siva and Sona Heiden. It stars Jai, Shazahn Padamsee, and Vijay Vasanth in the lead roles. The film features music composed by Satish Chakravarthy, cinematography by Chidamparam and editing done by duo Praveen K. L. and N. B. Srikanth.

Kanimozhi was launched in March 2010 and shot in 46 days, being completed in August 2010. The film was delayed by three months and released on 26 November 2010. It received mixed reviews from critics and became a box office failure.

== Plot ==
Rajesh has a habit of writing his daily life in a diary, while interpreting negative incidents in his life into happy incidents. He comes across a pretty girl named Anu, who he is smitten by but cannot muster the courage to tell her his feelings. Meanwhile, Koushik also takes a liking to Anu and uses a different method to convey his feelings. Who Anu falls for forms the crux of the story.

== Cast ==
- Jai as Rajesh
- Shazahn Padamsee as Anu
- Vijay Vasanth as Koushik
- Michael Thangadurai as Michael
- Ranga as Hari
- Ashwin Raja as Deepak
- Ajay as Dilip
- Lakshmi Ramakrishnan as Koushik's mother
- G. Gnanasambandam as Kaushik's father
- Srilatha as Rajesh's mother
- Rail Ravi as Rajesh's father
- Gayathri as Michael's mother
- Boys Rajan as HOD
- Ravi Venkatraman as Photography Lecturer
- Sai Prakash as Young Rajesh
- Sai Subash as Young Hari
- Swati Reddy in a guest appearance

== Production ==
=== Development ===
After the success of T. Siva's production Saroja (2008), the director Venkat Prabhu, recommended his assistant Sripathy Rangasamy to Siva for a potential collaboration. Sona Heiden co-produced the film under Unique Productions, making her debut in film production. Sripathy had written the story in college and built the screenplay around a story based on philosophy. Siva titled the film Kanimozhi, after getting permission from the politician of the same name. Sakthi Saravanan's associate P. Chidamparam was selected to make his debut as cinematographer with Kanimozhi. Music composer Satish Chakravarthy was signed for the project ten minutes into a meeting with the makers of the film. Praveen K. L. and N. B. Srikanth edited the film.

=== Casting ===
After working in two films where Sripathy had been an assistant director, Jai was signed on as the lead actor. The director suggested that he had wanted an actor who "looked 21" and felt Jai was "the best bet". Shazahn Padamsee was signed on as the lead actress and made her debut in Tamil films. Padamsee was approached after Sripathy was sent images of her portfolio by a model-coordinator from Mumbai. She agreed to do the film after consent from her father, theatre personality Alyque Padamsee. Vijay Vasanth, Jai's co-star in Chennai 600028 (2007), reunited with him for this project. Michael Thangadurai, in his film debut, was cast as one of Jai's friends after Siva saw him at an event celebrating the 100th day of Saroja's release.

=== Filming ===
The film was launched in a ceremony in Chennai in late March 2010 organised by the producers. Satish Chakravarthy performed songs from the film at the event, while noted actor Nassar compered. Following the launch, the film started the first schedule in April and completed the shoot within 46 days, shorter than the average Tamil film takes. Furthermore, unlike other most other Indian films, Kanimozhi was shot with live sound, while a special silent camera was also used. The sound was mixed at Yash Raj Studios in Mumbai and audiographed by Anandar Chandrahasan. The cast had spoken their lines on the set, with only Padamsee's voice being dubbed since she is not a native Tamil speaker.

The song "Muzhumadhi" was dubbed as the "underwater song" and was completed entirely through the use of graphics, while final mixing for many scenes were record at the Sterling Sound studio, United States. In June, the work progressed with Padamsee and Jai filming scenes at AVM Studios in Vadapalani, Chennai. The song recorded at the studio ended the filming portions of the project, which was wrapped up on 18 June 2010. Despite being a love story, the lead pair had only shot together for two weeks, although they have since stated that they bonded during the filming, helping the on-screen chemistry of the characters. Post-production works began in July 2010, preparing for a release in August. However, the film was delayed and works finished in September 2010.

== Soundtrack ==
The soundtrack to Kanimozhi was composed by Satish Chakravarthy, for whom it became his first theatrical release, as his previous album Leelai was delayed. The audio was released on 18 August 2010.

== Marketing and release ==
Kanimozhi was initially planned for release on 6 August 2010, but got delayed by almost three months because of the impending release of the higher profile Enthiran. An animated trailer, the first of its kind in Indian cinema, featuring Jai and Padamsee was screened at the audio launch event and released online in early September 2010. A final press meet, two weeks before release, was held on 13 November 2010 with most of the cast in attendance.

The producers held a premiere for Kanimozhi on 25 November 2010 in Chennai. Padamsee, whose Telugu film Orange released on the same day, was unable to attend the premiere as she was suffering from malaria. Kanimozhi had a wide released the following day.

== Critical reception ==
Upon release, Kanimozhi received mixed reviews from critics. Sify labelled the film as "OK" and that for "the intentions alone, the makers of Kanimozhi deserve a thumbs-up". Jai's role was appreciated and described as "endearingly likeable", while Padamsee "looked pretty and was photographed well" but "could have invested more energy and expression to her character". The critic added that Swati's scene in the climax "scores", and that music by Sathish Chakravarthy "are just about ok but come as speed breakers". The critic cites that "most scenes lack the energy that was required to elevate this film into a different level" and the final result is a "promising but sadly tiresome film" but that it will make you "leave the theatre with a smile on your face". Pavithra Srinivasan of Rediff.com praised the film's intentions but criticised the final product. Karthik Subramanian of The Hindu said the film is "a real test of your patience" but revealed it was a "genuine attempt at creating realistic cinema that also entertains", praising the story and the screenplay. He however concluded that the script was limited, and the actors' performances were therefore limited. The New Indian Express praised the performances of Jai and Michael but not Padamsee, adding, "as the movie progresses, the narration becomes very bland and the story moves at a slow pace. Monotony and boredom tend to set in towards the interval" and felt the title Kanimozhi had no relevance to the plot.

== Telugu version ==
In January 2012, it was revealed that the film was being dubbed in Telugu by producer Jakkula Nageshwara Rao. This led to Sona Heiden alleging that T. Siva had committed acts of fraud and forgery by trying to dub and sell the rights of Kanimozhi to others and thus requested the Tamil Film Producers Council to take action. She claimed that she entered into an agreement with Siva, proprietor of Amma Creations, on 28 January 2010, for purchasing the entire rights to Kanimozhi and thus secured 50% for any subsequent dubbed versions. Heiden said that Siva had entered into an agreement with third parties for dubbing the film in Telugu, alleging that he forged her signature and sold the rights. Nonetheless, work proceeded on the Telugu version and it was titled Love Journey to capitalise on the success of Journey, the Telugu dubbed version of Jai's Engaeyum Eppothum (2011). In March 2012, the Madras High Court issued a stay order against the release of Love Journey as per Heiden's complaint.
