= Sweet Talker =

Sweet Talker may refer to:

- Sweet Talker (film), 1991
  - Sweet Talker (soundtrack), the film's accompanying soundtrack album
- Sweet Talker (Jessie J album), 2014, or the title song
- Sweet Talker (EP), a 2010 EP by Like Moths to Flames
- "Sweet Talker" (song), a song by Years & Years and Galantis from Night Call
- "Sweet Talker", a song by Carly Rae Jepsen from Tug of War
- "Sweet Talker", a song by Janice Vidal from My Love
- "Sweet Talker", a song by Whitesnake from Ready an' Willing
