= Leelai =

2012 Indian film by Andrew Louis

- Poster
- Directed by: Andrew Louis
- Written by: Andrew Louis
- Produced by: Ramesh Babu
- Starring: Shiv Panditt; Manasi Parekh
- Cinematography: R. Velraj
- Edited by: Saravanan
- Music by: Satish Chakravarthy
- Production company: R Films
- Distributed by: Aascar Film Pvt. Ltd
- Release date: 27 April 2012
- Country: India
- Language: Tamil

Leelai (transl. Play) is a 2012 Indian Tamil-language romantic comedy film directed by Andrew Louis and produced by Ramesh Babu. It stars débutantes Shiv Panditt and Manasi Parekh in lead roles along with Santhanam and Suhasini Raju in pivotal roles. The music was composed by Satish Chakravarthy with editing by Saravanan and cinematography by R. Velraj. The film, which began in May 2008, opened after production delays on 27 April 2012.

== Plot ==
The movie begins with a trio of friends in college - Malar, Mona, and Gayathri. Mona falls in love with Karthik, despite the advice of Malar who suspects Karthik to be a complete flirt. One day, while on a date, Mona mentions Malar's views about Karthik to him, and this gets Karthik to start disliking Malar for interfering in his love life. When Karthik calls Mona, Malar accidentally picks up the call, and they get into an argument with Karthik venting out his anger towards her interfering in his love life. Shortly later, he breaks up with Mona. Gayathri, believing that Mona was a wrong choice in Karthik's life, begins to date Karthik, while Malar is firmly against it. The relationship ends the same way as his relationship with Mona.

A year or two later, both Karthik and Malar work at the same software company on different floors in the same building. One day, while trying to call his friend on Malar's floor, he accidentally calls Malar and the two realise their identities and presence in the building, and the age-old feud resumes. Over lunch, both Malar's friend Vicky and his own friend Suja advise Karthik to sort it with Malar. Vicky questions why Karthik would fight with such a beautiful woman as Malar. Karthik, not knowing what Malar looks like, decides to take a look at her. When he sees Malar, he falls in love at first sight. He then tries to reconcile with Malar, but she is not willing to forgive a flirt like Karthik. Karthik becomes desperate and begins to follow Malar, and in a chance meeting orchestrated by Karthik, he introduces himself as a sweet and kind person by the name of Sundar. Malar, who has never met Karthik face to face, believes his false identity and begins to open up to Sundar. They start to get to know each other and meet often, when one day, Suja, who works with Malar finds out about Karthik's game. Suja gives Karthik the ultimatum to reveal his true identity once Malar declares her love for Sundar. Karthik tries to salvage his relationship with hilarious consequences. But, all said and done, how Karthik reveals to Malar about his true identity and her acceptance or rejection forms the crux of the story.

== Cast ==
- Shiv Panditt as Karthik / Sundar
- Manasi Parekh as Karunai Malar
- Santhanam as Vicky
- Suhasini Raju as Suja
- Maya as Mona
- Vibha Natarajan as Gayathri
- Lakshmi Ramakrishnan as Karthik's mother
- Boys Rajan as Malar's father
- Lollu Sabha Easter as Vicky's friend

== Production ==
Andrew Louis met producer V. Ravichandran and narrated the script of Leelai, and two months later, he agreed to produce the film. The producer subsequently moved the film on to the hands of his brother, Ramesh Babu, under the subsidiary company R Films, which was also making Ravi Varman's Moscowin Kavery at the time. The director selected Hindi actor Shiv Panditt in the lead role after seeing him an advertisement for a mobile phone company, Airtel. After Panditt was signed on, he practised his Tamil dialogues by reading them repeatedly and understanding the emotions and punches. He also watched a lot of Tamil films to get attuned to the culture. The female lead was played by another Hindi actress Manasi Parekh who also followed the same techniques as Panditt. The film ran into a legal battle over its title Leelai with another film claiming it as their own. Ravichandran eventually won the case, forcing the other film to change its title from Leelai to Naan Aval Adhu.

== Soundtrack ==
The music is composed by debutant Satish Chakravarthy, a classmate of the director, Andrew Vasanth Louis. Satish also wrote the lyrics for two of the songs. The soundtrack released on 24 August 2009, whilst the composer later stated that he has also worked on a song for the theatrical trailer. "Shape of My Heart" by Sting served as an inspiration for "Jilendru Oru Kalavaram".

Track listing
No.	Title	Lyrics	Singer(s)	Length
1.	"Ponmaalai Pozhudhu"	Satish Chakravarthy	Benny Dayal
2.	"Oru Kili Oru Kili (Reprise)"	Vaali	Satish Chakravarthy
3.	"Jillendru Oru Kalavaram"	Satish Chakravarthy	Satish Chakravarthy
4.	"Bubble Gum"	Pa. Vijay	Sunitha Sarathy, Benny Dayal, SuVi, Leon James
5.	"Unnai Paartha Pinbhu"	Vaali	Haricharan, Marrianne
6.	"Oru Kili Oru Kili Siru Kili"	Vaali	Shreya Ghoshal, Satish Chakravarthy

== Release ==
The film had been ready for release since 2010, with Panditt in between making his début in Hindi films with Shaitan. The failure of Ramesh Babu's other production Moscowin Kavery also became a factor behind the delay. After two years of remaining complete but unreleased, the film was given a fresh lease of life after Ravichandran signed a deal to distribute Billa II, dubbed in trade circles as the "hottest film of the year", and thus theatres have shown their support for his brother by giving Leelai a big release.

== Critical reception ==
Leelai opened on 27 April 2012 alongside another delayed Tamil film Aathi Narayana. Critics from Sify gave the film a positive review citing that "Leelai is an enjoyable romantic ride, laced with peppy music and good fun" adding that "the director has worked out the romantic situations and spun it around to make it entertaining". Pavithra Srinivasan of Rediff.com noted that "it's a feel-good, simple, urban romance that has its funny moments and is worth a watch", and added that "Shiv Panditt and Manasi Parekh bring the urban Chennaiite alive - they are expressive, emote well, and nowhere do their lines sound jarring". In.com rated the film 3/5 and noted that "Leelai is a watchable rom-com" and added "If you are game for urban romance, then Leelai is worth a watch for its simple yet realistic treatment with fun". A critic from Supergoodmovies.com gave the film three stars out of five, concluding "Leelai may have its drawbacks, yet it is feel-good, fun and engaging. Job well done Andrew Louis".
