= Kalki Koechlin =

French actress and writer (born 1984)

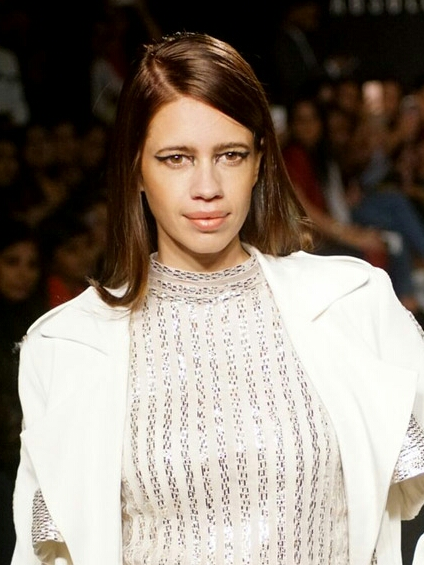
- Koechlin in 2017
- Born: 10 January 1984 (age 42); Pondicherry, India
- Citizenship: France
- Occupations: Actress; writer
- Years active: 2007–present
- Spouses: Anurag Kashyap (m. 2011; div. 2015); Guy Hershberg (m. 2024)
- Children: 1
- Relatives: Koechlin family
- Awards: Full list
- Honours: Order of Arts and Letters (2018)

Kalki Koechlin (/ˈkʌlki kɛˈklæ̃/; born 10 January 1984) is a French actress who works in films and stage. Known for her unconventional body of work, primarily in Hindi films, she is the recipient of several accolades, including a National Film Award and a Filmfare Award. Although a French citizen, she has been raised and lived most of her life in India.

Born in Pondicherry, Koechlin was drawn to theatre from a young age. She studied drama at Goldsmiths, University of London, and worked simultaneously with a theatre company. After returning to India, she made her Hindi film debut as Chanda in the black comedy-drama Dev.D (2009), winning the Filmfare Award for Best Supporting Actress. She subsequently starred in two of the highest-grossing Hindi films of their respective years, the comedy-dramas Zindagi Na Milegi Dobara (2011) and Yeh Jawaani Hai Deewani (2013), both of which garnered her Filmfare Award for Best Supporting Actress nominations. Koechlin also starred in and co-wrote the crime thriller That Girl in Yellow Boots (2011).

Koechlin's commercial success continued with the supernatural thriller Ek Thi Daayan (2013) and the musical drama Gully Boy (2019), while she received praise for her performances in independent films, including Waiting (2015) and Ribbon (2017). She earned acclaim and the National Film Award – Special Jury Award for her role of a young woman with cerebral palsy in the coming-of-age drama Margarita with a Straw (2014). Koechlin has since played supporting roles in streaming projects, including Amazon Prime Video's romantic drama Made in Heaven (2019–2023) and Netflix's crime thriller Sacred Games (2019) and drama film Kho Gaye Hum Kahan (2023).

Koechlin has written, produced, and acted in several stage productions. She co-wrote the drama Skeleton Woman (2009), which won her the MetroPlus Playwright Award, and made her directorial debut on stage with the tragicomedy Living Room (2015). Koechlin is also an activist and promotes various causes ranging from health and education to women's empowerment and gender equality.

== Early life and background ==
Kalki Koechlin was born in Pondicherry, India, on 10 January 1984 to French parents, Joël Koechlin and Françoise Armandie, who came to India from Angers, France, after adopting Hinduism. She is a descendant of Maurice Koechlin, a French structural engineer who played an important role in the design and construction of the Eiffel Tower. Koechlin's parents are devotees of Sri Aurobindo, and she spent a significant amount of her early childhood in Auroville. The family later settled in Kallatty, a village near Ooty, Tamil Nadu, where Koechlin's father established a business designing hang-gliders and ultralight aircraft.

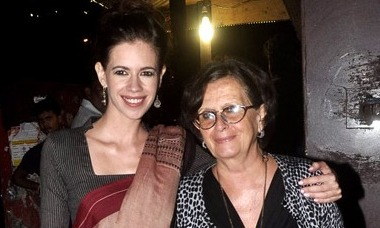
Koechlin with her mother Françoise Armandie in 2016

Koechlin was brought up in a strict environment in Ooty where she spoke English, Tamil, and French. Her parents divorced when she was fifteen; her father moved to Bangalore and remarried, while Koechlin continued living with her mother. She has described the time that she spent at Kallatty between the ages of 5 and 8, before her parents' divorce, as her "happiest". Koechlin has a half-brother from her mother's previous marriage, and a half-brother from her father's subsequent marriage.

Koechlin studied at Hebron School, a boarding school in Ooty, where she was involved in acting and writing. She has admitted to being shy and quiet as a child. Koechlin aspired to study psychiatry and become a criminal psychologist. After completing her schooling at the age of 18, she moved to London and studied drama and theatre at Goldsmiths, University of London. There, she worked for two years with the theatre company Theatre of Relativity, writing The Rise of the Wild Hunt and performing in plays such as David Hare's The Blue Room and Marivaux's The Dispute. She worked as a waitress on weekends.

After completing her studies, Koechlin moved back to India and lived with her maternal half-brother in Bangalore. Unable to find work there, she moved to Mumbai, where she worked with theatre directors and with Atul Kumar and Ajay Krishnan, the founders of a Mumbai-based theatre company called "The Company Theatre". They were looking for actors for a theatrical festival, Contacting the World, to be held in Liverpool.

== Film career ==
=== Early work (2009–2010) ===
After moving to Mumbai, Koechlin auditioned for Anurag Kashyap's black comedy-drama Dev.D (2009), a modern-day adaptation of Sarat Chandra Chattopadhyay's 1917 Bengali novel Devdas. Starring alongside Abhay Deol and Mahie Gill, Koechlin plays the role of Leni / Chanda, a young woman who turns to prostitution after a leaked sex tape scandal. The character was based on Chandramukhi, a pivotal character in the novel, a prostitute who fell in love with the titular character. Kashyap initially rejected Koechlin as she was not Indian, and did not match his visualisation of the character, but he changed his mind and offered her the role after seeing her audition tape. The film opened to positive reviews from critics upon release, with particular praise for Koechlin's performance, which was described as "imbued [...] with a touching fragility" and "astonishingly [appropriate]". Critics were more impressed by her character's complexity, but thought of Koechlin's performance in the film's first half as "amateurish". Moreover, it emerged as a commercial success at the box-office, earning ₹208 million worldwide. Koechlin's performance in the film earned her the Filmfare Award for Best Supporting Actress.

Koechlin's only film appearance of 2010 was in a supporting role in the black comedy The Film Emotional Atyachar. Co-starring Ranvir Shorey, Vinay Pathak and Ravi Kishan among others, the film opened to mixed-to-negative reviews from critics, as did Koechlin's performance as a manipulative woman who is abducted by two corrupt policemen. Komal Nahta of Koimoi labelled her performance as "strictly average", while Blessyy Chettiar of Daily News and Analysis felt that she was underused. Koechlin was next committed to star in I am Afia, one of the four segments of Onir's anthology film I Am, but it went into production with a modified plot for the segment. In an interview with The Telegraph, Onir said, "as we discussed the subject more and more, both Koechlin and me felt that the narrative was becoming too hurried in the 25-minute limit". Koechlin, who was to play the role of an NGO worker in the film was ultimately replaced by Nandita Das, after the change of plot.

=== Breakthrough and commercial success (2011–2014) ===
After facing some early struggle for film roles, Koechlin had four film releases in 2011, garnering widespread praise for her performances in them. The first was Bejoy Nambiar's crime thriller Shaitan, alongside an ensemble cast of Rajeev Khandelwal, Gulshan Devaiah, Shiv Panditt, Neil Bhoopalam, Kirti Kulhari, Rajit Kapoor, Pawan Malhotra and Rajkummar Rao. Based on the 2007 murder of Adnan Patrawala incident, the film told the story of five friends who get embroiled in a crime. She played the role of a disturbed teenager and called it an "exhausting experience", saying that she felt drained while trying to, "get into a psyche of someone who does a lot of drugs and booze, has lost her mind a little bit and is very vulnerable". The film opened to positive reviews from critics upon release, with high praise for Koechlin's performance, with Raja Sen calling her "an increasingly striking actress". It emerged as a moderate commercial success at the box-office, grossing ₹390 million worldwide. Koechlin's performance in the film earned her a first nomination for the Screen Award for Best Actress.

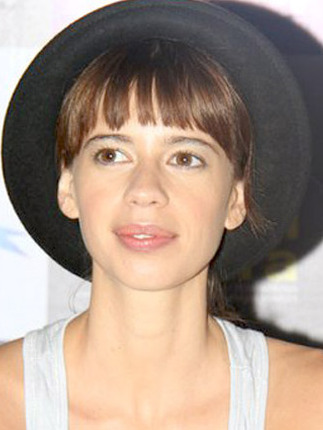
Koechlin at a 2011 press conference for Zindagi Na Milegi Dobara at Chandigarh

Koechlin next starred in Zoya Akhtar's ensemble coming-of-age romantic comedy-drama Zindagi Na Milegi Dobara alongside an ensemble cast of Hrithik Roshan, Deol, Farhan Akhtar and Katrina Kaif. Akhtar had expressed her wish to work with Koechlin in a prior interview with NDTV, having seen her in Dev.D and the then-unreleased That Girl in Yellow Boots (2011). Revolving around the story of three childhood friends who take a three-week road trip in Spain, the film saw her portray a South Bombay interior designer, who is slightly possessive of her fiancé. Koechlin, who took diction classes for the role which required her to speak accented Hindi, revealed that she was keen to do the film because her work in such projects as Dev.D and Shaitan had led her to being typecast in dark roles of prostitutes, troubled teenagers, and social misfits. The film received to widespread critical acclaim upon release, with high praise directed towards Koechlin's performance. Gaurav Malani of The Times of India deemed her "excellent", and Raja Sen in his review for Rediff.com noted her as "histrionically strong enough to manage varied roles". With worldwide collections of ₹1.53 billion (US$16 million), Zindagi Na Milegi Dobara emerged as a major blockbuster at the box-office, ranking as the fifth highest-grossing Hindi film of the year and one of the highest-grossing Hindi films of all time. The film earned Koechlin her second nomination for the Filmfare Award for Best Supporting Actress.

Koechlin expanded her career into screenwriting with Kashyap's crime thriller That Girl in Yellow Boots. She said that Kashyap asked her to write the script for the film as he was looking for a woman's perspective for the story. Co-starring alongside Naseeruddin Shah, the film saw her play a British woman who travels to Mumbai in search of her biological father. The role was partially based on her own experience as a 'white-girl' in India. Shot in a short duration of thirteen days, the film was screened at the 2010 Toronto International Film Festival and the 67th Venice International Film Festival, among other venues. It opened to critical acclaim, with Koechlin receiving high praise for her performance. Giving the film 3.5 stars out of 4, Roger Ebert wrote that Koechlin "creates a memorable woman who is sad and old beyond her years". Sukanya Verma of Rediff.com described Koechlin as "unrestrained and uncorrupted". NDTV film critic Saibal Chatterjee also lauded the film and deemed her performance as "absolute perfection". However, the film emerged as a commercial failure at the box-office. Koechlin's final release of the year was as an aspiring dance in the Sanjay Leela Bhansali-produced musical comedy My Friend Pinto opposite Prateik Babbar. The film emerged as a critical and commercial disaster at the box-office.

The following year, Koechlin starred alongside Deol and Emraan Hashmi for Dibakar Banerjee's political thriller Shanghai. Based on the Greek writer Vassilis Vassilikos's 1967 novel Z (made into a movie of the same name), the film premiered at the 2012 Toronto Film Festival. Koechlin portrayed the role of a political activist, which she found challenging. She said that the character was, "someone who is not an accepted person [...] an outsider". It received positive reviews from critics upon release; however Koechlin's performance received mixed reviews. While Russell Edwards noted the "biting edge" she brought to the role, Aniruddha Guha thought of her as the "weakest link" in the film. Shanghai emerged as a sleeper hit at the box-office, grossing ₹355 million (US$3.7 million) worldwide.

Koechlin's commercial success continued with both of her 2013 releases, the supernatural thriller Ek Thi Daayan and the ensemble coming-of-age romantic comedy-drama Yeh Jawaani Hai Deewani. Ek Thi Daayan was based on Mobius Trips, a short story written by Mukul Sharma, the father of Konkona Sen Sharma, who also starred in the film. Koechlin played the role of a Canada-based music teacher who is suspected of practising witchcraft. For her role in the film, she learned to play the guitar, and lip synced "Yaaram", one of the film's tracks. The film received positive reviews from critics upon release, with Koechlin's performance receiving mixed reviews, with critic Anupama Chopra remarking that she was "an interesting actor but the film doesn't know what to do with her". It emerged as a moderate commercial success at the box-office, grossing over ₹402 million (US$4.2 million) worldwide.

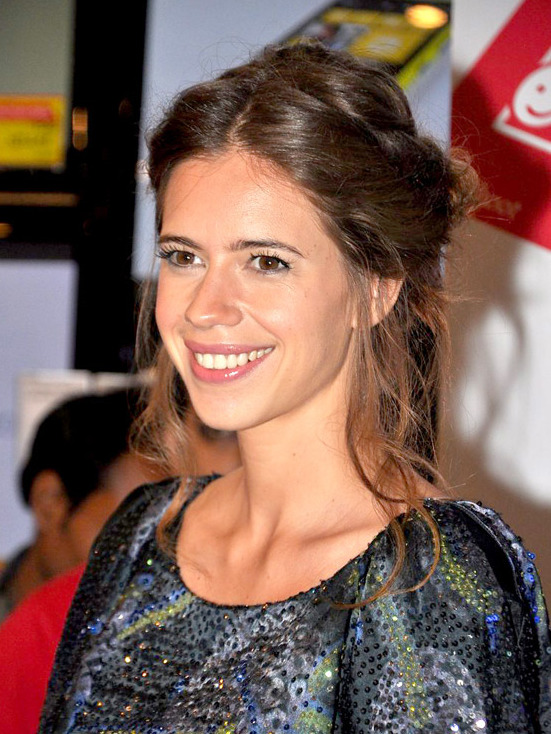
Koechlin at a promotional event for Nokia Lumia

Ayan Mukerji's coming-of-age romantic comedy-drama Yeh Jawaani Hai Deewani, saw Koechlin star alongside an ensemble cast of Deepika Padukone, Ranbir Kapoor and Aditya Roy Kapur. She portrayed the role of a tomboy, who unrequitedly falls for her best friend, but later moves on and marries someone else. Koechlin, who was nursing her hospitalised mother and simultaneously filming for the project called it a "really tough time". Nonetheless, she described her time on the film sets as "fun", and developed a close friendship with Padukone. Yeh Jawaani Hai Deewani opened to widespread critical acclaim upon release, with high praise directed towards Koechlin's performance and comic timing, with News18's Rajeev Masand writing, "Koechlin invests heart and spunkiness to the part". The film emerged as a major blockbuster at the box-office, ranking as the fifth highest-grossing Hindi film of the year and one of the highest-grossing Bollywood films, grossing ₹3.02 billion (US$31 million) worldwide. Koechlin's performance in the film earned her a third nomination for the Filmfare Award for Best Supporting Actress. Later in 2013, Koechlin appeared in a video entitled It's Your Fault, along with VJ Juhi Pandey. Dealing with the issue of sexual assaults on women, the video mocks the mindset that blames women for provoking rapes. It was created by All India Bakchod, and was released on their YouTube channel. It's Your Fault went viral, with over 150,000 views in two days.

Koechlin's only film appearance in 2014 was in the romantic comedy Happy Ending opposite Saif Ali Khan, in which she played the comic role of an obsessive girlfriend. She credited her performance in Yeh Jawaani Hai Deewani for landing her the role, and stated that people noticed her comic timing in the film, which worked in her favour. Described as a "spoof on the film industry and on all the romantic comedies", the film opened to mixed-to-positive reviews from critics upon release, with Koechlin's performance receiving praise. Saurabh Dwivedi of India Today wrote that "Koechlin steals the show with her perfect portrayal of a nagging girlfriend", and Rohit Vats of Hindustan Times noted that, although her character in the film felt a bit forced, she delivered a "charming" performance. Despite positive reviews, it emerged as a below-average grosser at the box-office.

=== Critical acclaim and streaming projects (2015–present) ===
In 2015, Koechlin starred in Shonali Bose's drama Margarita with a Straw, playing a young woman with cerebral palsy who leaves her home in India to study in New York City, unexpectedly falls in love, and embarks on a journey of self-discovery. Her character was inspired by Malini Chib, Bose's cousin. Bose first approached Koechlin, who she said was her "first and only choice", for the role when the latter was shooting for Yeh Jawaani Hai Deewani. Due to the clashing schedule, Bose went on to audition other actresses to substitute Koechlin, but felt that "something was missing" in each one, and she eventually decided to push the filming for three months to accommodate her. In an interview with the Times of India, Koechlin acknowledged that the role was the most challenging of her film career, and she took six months off her filming schedule to prepare for it. She underwent a six-week training workshop with actor Adil Hussain, aimed at making her "body language seem natural", while also focusing on the speech pattern of patients with cerebral palsy. Koechlin spent considerable time with Chib and her physiotherapist and speech therapist. She also attended a month-long workshop in Delhi, where she worked on the movement of the body parts. Although the film covers aspects of physical disability, Koechlin dubbed it "a romcom with some hurdles".

Margarita with a Straw premiered at the 2014 Toronto International Film Festival, and was also screened at Tallinn Black Nights Film Festival, BFI London Film Festival, 19th Busan International Film Festival, and the Santa Barbara International Film Festival. Koechlin garnered widespread attention and critical acclaim for her portrayal of a disabled person. While Leslie Felperin of The Hollywood Reporter made a detailed note of her "bravura performance in both physical and emotional terms", Saibal Chatterjee deemed her "[simply] brilliant". Firstpost's Deepanjana Pal ascribed her screen appeal to her lack of acting pretense, and wrote "[Koechlin] has done a good job of miming the physicality [...] but what is truly remarkable is the lack of artifice in her expressions". John Beifuss compared her performance to Eddie Redmayne's act as Stephen Hawking in the biographical drama The Theory of Everything (2014), in his review for The Commercial Appeal. He gave Koechlin the highest praise writing that her performance would have attracted Academy Award notice in a major film studio production. The view was echoed by Variety critic Guy Lodge, who was particularly impressed by her range. Koechlin won several accolades for the performance, including the Best Actress Award at the Tallinn Black Nights Film Festival, the Screen Award for Best Actress (Critics), and the National Film Award – Special Jury Award. Additionally, she garnered Best Actress nominations at the Seattle International Film Festival and the Asian Film Awards.

Koechlin appeared alongside Parineeti Chopra, Richa Chadda, and Bhumi Pednekar in Y-Films's mini web-series Man's World, a satire on gender roles. The series was released on YouTube in April 2015. She next starred in Anu Menon's comedy-drama Waiting (2016), which depicted the relationship between two people who befriend each other in a hospital, while nursing their respective comatose spouses. For her role of a young and brash social media-savvy, Koechlin dyed her hair black, as Menon wanted her to look more "earthy". The film had its world premiere at the Dubai International Film Festival (DIFF) in December 2015, and had its theatrical release in India on 27 May 2016. It opened to critical acclaim upon release, as did Koechlin's performance. Sukanya Verma of Rediff.com called the film "absolutely riveting", and also lauded the "stunningly unhindered" Koechlin writing that she used her aura, "in the most mesmeric fashion to create a woman we sympathise with and wish well for". Film critic Kunal Guha thought that film belonged to Koechlin who, "impresses by managing to wordlessly convey her character's state of mind in every scene". Despite positive reviews, Waiting emerged as a below-average grosser at the box-office.

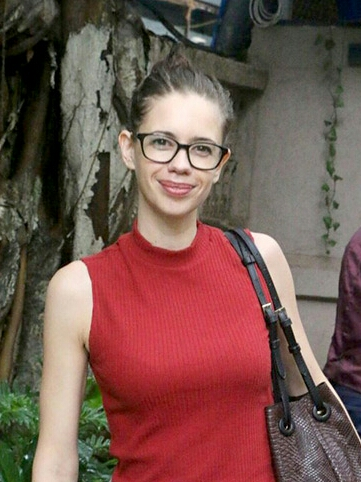
Koechlin at a film screening in 2017

Koechlin appeared in two documentary films in 2016—Freedom Matters, a project aimed at spreading awareness on human trafficking, and Living Shakespeare, a BBC production where she drew parallels between Ophelia and Indian women. She was invited to be a part of the jury presided by Hungarian director Béla Tarr, at the 2016 Marrakech International Film Festival. The 2016 Mumbai Film Festival saw the release of two of Koechlin's films—the acclaimed A Death in the Gunj and the panned Mantra. In the former, she played Mimi, a Kolkata-based Anglo-Indian woman, who seduces a younger disturbed teenager. To prepare for the role, she attended an acting workshop conducted by the film's casting director, Atul Mongia, and also learnt an Anglo-Indian accent. She thought of it unlike anything that she had done before, calling it "a very sexual, beautiful character". A Death in the Gunj's release was delayed on multiple occasions due to varying reasons. Critics, who were appreciative of Koechlin's performance, called her "ever dependable" and "a perfect fit".

Both Mantra and A Death in the Gunj released theatrically in the first half of 2017–in the months of March and June respectively. Koechlin's following release, Howard Rosemeyer's delayed buddy road film Jia Aur Jia co-starring Richa Chadha, focused on two strangers of the same name who embark on a road trip together. Critics such as Sweta Kaushal of Hindustan Times and Anna M. M. Vetticad of Firstpost, singled out Koechlin's performance for praise, while negatively reviewing the film. Her final release of the year was the drama Ribbon alongside Sumeet Vyas. Directed by Rakhee Sandilya, the film told the story of a couple living in Mumbai and the problems that they face with an unplanned pregnancy. Koechlin portrayed a sales executive who faces discrimination at the workplace, which was regarded by critics as the most mature performance of her film career. Saibal Chatterjee from NDTV was particularly impressed by her "star turn in one of the meatiest roles that she has ever played on the big screen".

Koechlin played a French immigrant in Siddharth Sinha's short film The Job (2018). Produced by Kushal Shrivastava, the production was a psychological thriller that was meant to be a critique of the corporate sector and its treatment of employees. Her performance in the film received praise, with writers ascribing the film's appeal to her persuasive performance. Koechlin was awarded the Order of Arts and Letters by the French government, being presented the award formally by Alexandre Ziegler, the Ambassador of France to India.

In 2019, Koechlin starred alongside Ranveer Singh, Alia Bhatt and Siddhant Chaturvedi in Akhtar's musical drama Gully Boy as a record producer who has an affair with the titular character. The film emerged as a critical and commercial success at the box-office, grossing ₹2.22 billion (US$31 million) worldwide, ranking as the ninth highest-grossing Hindi film of the year. The same year, she ventured into OTT with the Amazon Prime Video romantic drama web series Made in Heaven (2019–present), which was a dark take on the Big Fat Indian Wedding, human nature and greater social dynamics in Delhi. Starring alongside an ensemble cast of Sobhita Dhulipala, Arjun Mathur, Jim Sarbh, Shashank Arora and Shivani Raghuvanshi, Koechlin played the role of a woman deeply lodged in her insecurities under the guise of a confident socialite. The series received widespread critical acclaim upon release, with high praise directed towards Koechlin's performance. She reprised her role in the second season which released in 2023. Later that year, she starred in the second season of Netflix's neo-noir crime thriller web series Sacred Games (2018–19) as a self-styled godwoman alongside Saif Ali Khan, Nawazuddin Siddiqui, Pankaj Tripathi and Ranvir Shorey. The second season received mixed reviews from critics upon release, but praise was directed towards Koechlin's performance. She followed it up with the ZEE5 psychological horror thriller Bhram.

In 2022, Koechlin starred in the English-language drama Goldfish, as a daughter attempting to confront the traumas of her childhood whilst tending to her mother suffering from dementia (played by Deepti Naval). The film premiered at the 27th Busan International Film Festival to critical acclaim. In her review for The Indian Express, Shubhra Gupta praised Koechlin as "arresting [and] unvarnished [...] through the film". She then had a supporting role in the coming-of-age drama Kho Gaye Hum Kahan (2023) which starred Chaturvedi, Ananya Panday and Adarsh Gourav in lead roles. Directed by debutant Arjun Varain Singh, and written by Singh, Akhtar and Reema Kagti, the film was released on Netflix. It received positive reviews from critics upon release, and Koechlin's portrayal of a photographer who engages in a relationship with a younger man received praise.

== Other work ==
=== Stage career ===
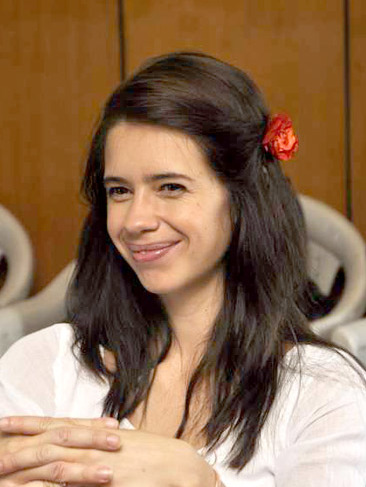
Koechlin at the Mumbai Drama School

Koechlin has been associated with theatre from a young age. As a child, she attended theatre workshops in Pondicherry. Her mother was adamant that she complete her studies before venturing into an acting career, sending her to London to study drama and theatre. During her years in the film industry, Koechlin has continued to participate in theatrical productions. She has written, produced, and acted in several stage plays in India. In a 2014 interview with Verve she said, "Theater is really an actor's playground [...] There's nothing like performing for a live audience". Koechlin founded her own theatre production company, Little Productions in June 2015.

Koechlin won The Hindu's 2009 The MetroPlus Playwright Award along with Prashant Prakash for the play Skeleton Woman which they co-wrote, directed by Nayantara Kotian. The play is a modern adaptation of an Inuit folk tale about a writer; Koechlin played the protagonist's wife. It premiered at the Prithvi Theatre, Mumbai. Asmit Pathare of Mumbai Theatre Guide in his review wrote: "The actors being the playwrights themselves, seemed to know what they were doing". She also co-wrote Colour Blind, a play that attempts to rediscover different aspects of the personality of Indian poet Rabindranath Tagore through his life and writings. In dual roles, Koechlin plays the Argentine writer and intellectual Victoria Ocampo (a close associate of Tagore), and a young woman who is writing a research paper on him. Aditi Sharma of Mumbai Theatre Guide calling Koechlin the "star of the play" noted that she "really put in an effort to build her character and it shows". Koechlin's other early stage appearances include Atul Kumar's Trivial Disasters, The Real Inspector Hound, Ajay Krishnan's Hair, where she plays Rapunzel, and Kapoor's Hamlet, The Clown Prince.

Koechlin made her directorial debut on stage with the 2015 play Living Room. Development of the play began in 2014, when Koechlin wrote a four-page conversation between Death and an old woman who is in a strange surreal space, about to die but unwilling to exit the world. She further worked on the script of the play in 2015. In a 2016 interview with Mumbai Mirror she said, "Last year, when I was unemployed for six months, I started fleshing out the story. It turned into a comedy on life and death". The play was staged at the Ranga Shankara Hall, Bangalore, on 24 July 2015. Koechlin also worked in Rajat Kapoor's What's Done, Is Done, an adaptation of Shakespeare's tragedy Macbeth. She played Lady Macbeth and doubled up as one of the witches for the play. The first show of the play was staged on 5 June 2016 in Mumbai.

=== Philanthropy ===
Koechlin identifies herself as a feminist and extensively campaigns for the cause of gender equality. She wrote an article on gender pay-gap for 22 August 2014 issue of Forbes India, and is vocal in her support for the issue: "Equal pay won't happen because there is a hero-based industry [...] we need to strive for scripts that empower women, make women our heroes, too." Koechlin has presented several monologues aimed at spreading public awareness, and has used YouTube as a platform or forum for issues that she advocates for. She appeared in Puma's "Do You?" advertisement campaign which encouraged women to, "find their best self". Koechlin, alongside Jacqueline Fernandez and Sakshi Malik led a group of women at an event, organised as part of the movement, to break the Guinness World Record of "Most people to hold the abdominal plank position" for 1 minute. She has been appointed as the ambassador of such campaigns as Vogue India's "Vogue Empower" and United Colors of Benetton's "#Unitedbyhalf", initiatives aimed at spreading awareness on issues of women's safety and gender equality respectively.

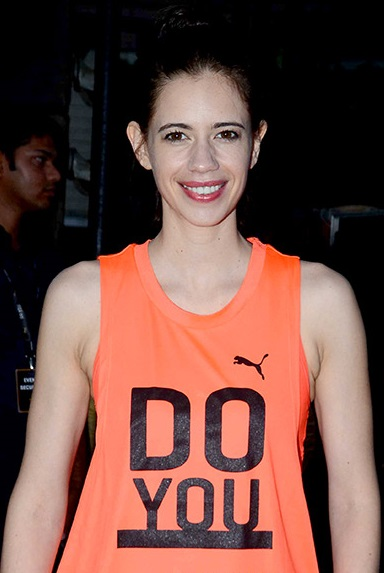
Koechlin at Puma's "Do You?" Campaign

Koechlin was the ambassador for Cottonworld's "Adopt-A-Tree" initiative, under which the brand provided its customers with viable seeds and instructions of planting a tree, urging them to give back to the environment. She endorsed her eco-friendly lifestyle in an interview with journalist Priyadarshini Nandy, ahead of the 2012 Convention on Biological Diversity in Hyderabad. She supported the "Your Cartons. My Classroom" initiative by TERI, Tetra Pak and The Times of India, which promoted the recycling of empty tetra pak cartons into furniture for school classrooms. Koechlin starred in a short film, entitled Hawa Badlo, aimed at spreading awareness on the health concerns of air pollution. She is also a supporter of animal rights, and appeared in a 2012 PETA advertisement campaign encouraging the adoption of stray cats and dogs.

Koechlin advocates for LGBT rights, and has featured in such video campaigns as Jagatjit Industries's IICE Vodka advertisement "Kinki Chilli". Directed by Shiven Surendranath, the video emphasised on an individual's freedom to choose their sexual identity. Koechlin expressed her support to LGBT community in an International Women's Day interview with The Huffington Post saying that education was essential for developing sensitisation to LGBT rights. Video messages recorded by Koechlin and Kunal Kapoor, in which they voiced their support for the LGBTQ community were screened at the 2016 Delhi International Queer Theater and Film Festival. Koechlin was featured on the March 2015 cover of Bombay Dost, India's first gay magazine.

Koechlin is also vociferous on a variety of other issues, including health promotion, education for children in rural areas, and child sexual abuse among others. Koechlin actively participates in the P & G Shiksha campaign for educating children living in rural parts of India. She participated in the 2015 Mumbai Marathon, a charitable event that aimed to spread awareness about issues such as: education, health issues like cancer and AIDS, and senior citizen welfare, accompanied by Shonali Bose's cousin Malini Chib. Having gone through sexual abuse at the age of nine, Koechlin aims to spread awareness around the issue, saying that it was, "important that parents remove the taboo around the word sex or private parts so kids can speak openly and be saved from potential abuse". She also spoke at the All Indian Conference for Child Sexual Abuse organised by actor Rahul Bose's non-governmental organisation HEAL.

=== Performance poetry and writing ===
Koechlin began writing poetry during her childhood and has variously performed and recorded self-written poems. A patron of socially relevant poetry, she performed a solo theatrical monologue entitled, Wo-Manologue at a December 2016 event organised by the FICCI Ladies Organisation. She has also sporadically recited An Intense Piece about the Truths of Womanhood, a soliloquy, on such events as the International Women's Day special at the India Today Conclave in March 2014 and the 2016 Kalyani Nagar meeting of the FICCI Ladies Organisation. She recited three separate poems focusing on consumerism, the contemporary society, and a comic nursery rhyme at "Spotlight", a poetry slam in Mumbai. Koechlin was a member of the jury at the 2016 National Youth Poetry Slam, held in Bangalore.

Koechlin starred in a 2016 video, entitled Printing Machine that talked about the approach of media and society towards crimes against women, as a part of Culture Machine's video series "Unblushed". The five-minute video was released on YouTube and featured a poem penned and recited by Koechlin. The video was well received by critics and viewers. She also received a letter of appreciation from Melinda Gates, co-founder of Bill & Melinda Gates Foundation, for her contribution to bringing attention to women's issues. The success of Printing Machine was followed by a second collaborative video for the Unblushed series, Noise, another original poem which was released on the company's YouTube channel on 22 June 2017 (World Music Day).

At the SpokenFest 2017, organised by Kommune India, Koechlin performed a 17-minute act entitled "Fairy Tale". The piece aimed to highlight the "intrinsically faulty" representation propagated by fairy tales. She suggested alternative readings that, among other things, disregarded the notions of a princess "[who] must never displease", a prince, who "has to be gentle and yet be a man" and interpreted a witch not as the "antagonist, but [...] as a strong woman misunderstood by the society". In response to the poem, Ishita Sengupta of The Indian Express suggested a re-reading of the fairy tales "in a new light".

Koechlin's debut book Elephant in the Womb is expected to come out by the end of 2021. This illustrated non-fiction book will trace her personal experiences with pregnancy and motherhood. The illustrations are done by Valeriya Polyanychko and it will be published by Penguin Random House India.

== Personal life ==
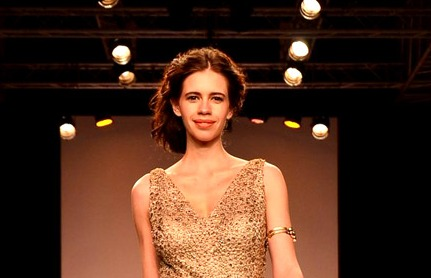
Koechlin at the 2014 Lakme Fashion Week

Koechlin married filmmaker Anurag Kashyap in April 2011, at her maternal home in Ooty. The two met while filming her debut film Dev.D. On 13 November 2013, Koechlin and Kashyap issued a joint statement addressing their separation. On 19 May 2015, they filed for divorce at a Mumbai family court. During the period between their separation and eventual divorce, the couple went through marriage counselling. Amidst all the news and speculation surrounding the separation, Koechlin revealed that she regretted being so transparent about her personal life, stating in 2012, "It just takes centre stage instead of your work". Since her divorce, she has rarely mentioned her personal life in public. Tabloids have often linked her romantically with other Bollywood stars, but she has strongly denied any such rumours. Koechlin adopted a rescue cat named Dosa.

On 30 September 2019, Koechlin confirmed her pregnancy with her boyfriend, Guy Hershberg, an Israeli musician. Their daughter was born on 7 February 2020 through water birth. Koechlin and Hershberg got married in 2024.

She stated in an interview with Daily News and Analysis, that she was a victim of stereotypes in her teenage years and early film career, where she was stereotyped as a '"white girl" in India. She goes on to say, "Even as an actor, you have days when you haven't slept enough, you don't feel like you're good enough or pretty enough ... But ultimately, it's all about attitude. You must live with a little abandon and not be self-conscious. You ought to stop staring at yourself in the mirror, and just smile a little!" She acknowledged her share of confusion regarding her identity as a "white-skinned woman growing up in Tamil Nadu", who had to defend her "Indian-ness" at numerous occasions. In an interview with The Local, she said of herself, "My skin is white, but my heart is brown." She has a French passport, and stated in an interview that she chose it over an Indian passport as it is easier to travel with the former. She also holds an Overseas Citizenship of India card.

== Media image ==
It's not my job to keep myself in the news. My job is to keep performing. If I spend time promoting myself or being concerned about my image, I wouldn't have the energy to do the work that I'm doing.

— Kalki Koechlin, in June 2013

Koechlin has been acknowledged in the media for her unconventional roles in films and her straightforward personality. Reviewing her work in Printing Machine, film critic and journalist Subhash K. Jha deemed her the "free-thinking actress this industry Bollywood needs". Megha Shah of the GQ called her "someone who can speak her mind, sound intelligent and also look stunning in a bikini". Members of the media have subsequently labelled her as a role model for women across the country. Bhavya Sadhwani, describing her as "a real life heroine", lauded her for "voicing her opinions without an iota of inhibition". Another editorial in The Week stated that with her powerful performances, and by voicing her opinions, she "has always stayed ahead of her contemporaries in the industry".

Following her portrayal of such characters as those in Dev.D, Zindagi Na Milegi Dobara, Shaitan, and Margarita With a Straw, Koechlin gained wider recognition and earned the tag of a "nonconformist". Clarisse Loughrey of The Independent described her as a pioneer for the Indian film industry owing to her unconventional roles and outspoken public presence. Don Groves of Forbes wrote that she has "managed to subvert stereotypes by playing characters who are nothing like each other". The columnist and film critic Vinayak Chakravorty cites Koechlin as one of the "new 'new-wave' actors" who has proved her easy screen presence in her short time in the film industry.

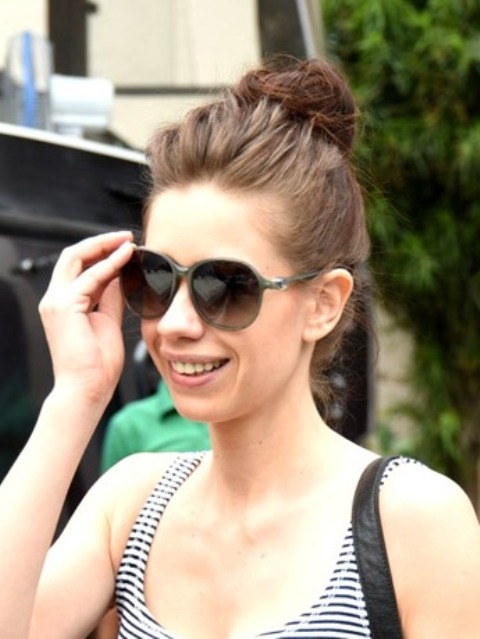
Koechlin at an advertisement shoot in 2013

Koechlin is described as a style icon by the Indian media and has been dubbed as the "queen of experimental fashion". Raedita Tandan of Filmfare deemed Koechlin's fashion appeal as "effortless" and "un-diva esque". Such designers and photographers as the slow-process multimedia artist Riyas Komu and Elle couturier Amit Aggarwal have described Koechlin's persona as representative of "a sense of eclecticism" and "fresh, akin to a new wave" respectively. Koechlin has been a part of numerous fashion shows, including the Lakme Fashion Week, India International Jewellery Week, and Mijwan Fashion Show (Shabana Azmi's annual fund raiser). She also made a guest appearance at the Milan Fashion Week, one of the global "Big Four Fashion Weeks".

Koechlin is particularly known in the Indian media and film industry for her dedication to her work. Atul Kumar, founder of The Company Theatre, and her co-star in Hamlet, noted: "her commitment as an actor is relentless". The director Shonali Bose, while filming Margarita With a Straw, said Koechlin was able to give perfect long takes for the film because of the "intense hard work that she put into the preparation of her role". Her former husband, Anurag Kashyap—who directed her in three films—believes that she "has grown as an actor since Dev.D". Rajat Kapoor, in whose Hamlet Koechlin performed as Ophelia, believes she is an actress who has the "sensitivity and understanding of filmmaking and theatre".

Koechlin is a celebrity endorser and has been associated with several brands and services, including: Coca-Cola, Olay, Vogue, Micromax, Titan, Grey Goose's Style du jour, and AOC International including the cosmetic giant Oriflame. In an interview for Asian News International, Koechlin said that she "believes that everyone, whether an actor or a model, should endorse a brand which matches their ideologies". She was also the brand ambassador of the "Cinema For Care" section, aimed at creating awareness about disability issues at the All Lights India International Film Festival (ALIIFF) held in Thiruvananthapuram, Kerala in November 2015.

== Filmography ==
=== Feature films ===
Key
†	Denotes films that have not yet been released

Year	Title	Role	Language	Notes	Ref.
2007	Laaga Chunari Mein Daag	Announcer	Hindi	Cameo	
2009	Dev.D	Leni / Chanda	Hindi		
2010	The Film Emotional Atyachar	Sophie	Hindi		
2011	That Girl in Yellow Boots	Ruth Edscer	Hindi		
2011	Shaitan	Amrita "Amy" Jayshankar	Hindi		
2011	Zindagi Na Milegi Dobara	Natasha Arora	Hindi		
2011	My Friend Pinto	Maggie	Hindi		
2011	Trishna	Herself	Hindi	Cameo	
2012	Shanghai	Shalini Sahay	Hindi		
2013	Ek Thi Daayan	Lisa Dutt	Hindi		
2013	Yeh Jawaani Hai Deewani	Aditi Mehra	Hindi		
2014	Happy Ending	Vishakha Singh	Hindi		
2015	Margarita with a Straw	Laila Kapoor	Hindi		
2015	Waiting	Tara Deshpande	Hindi		
2015	Un plus une	Herself	French	Cameo	
2015	Kaash	Elsbeth	Hindi	Cameo	
2016	Freedom Matters	Herself	English	Documentary film	
2016	Living Shakespeare	Herself	English	Documentary film	
2016	A Death in the Gunj	Mimi	English		
2016	Mantra	Piya Kapoor	English; Hindi		
2017	Jia Aur Jia	Jia	Hindi		
2017	Ribbon	Sahana Mehra	Hindi		
2017	Azmaish: A Journey Through the Subcontinent	Herself	English	Documentary film	
2019	Gully Boy	Shweta "Sky" Mehta	Hindi		
2019	Kadakh	Francoise Marie	Hindi		
2019	CandyFlip	Emily	English; Hindi		
2019	Nerkonda Paarvai	Unnamed	Tamil	Special appearance in the song "Kaalam"	
2020	Paava Kadhaigal	Penelope	Tamil	Anthology film; segment: "Love Panna Uttranum"	
2022	Goldfish	Anamika Fields	English		
2023	Sam Bahadur	Unnamed	Hindi	Special appearance in the song "Dum Hai Toh Aaja"	
2023	Kho Gaye Hum Kahan	Simran Kohli	Hindi		
2025	Nesippaya	Indirani Jahan	Tamil		
2025	Emma and Angel †	Emma	English	Post-production	

=== Television ===
Year	Title	Role	Language	Notes
2015	Man's World	Promotion announcer	Hindi	Cameo
2016	Kalki's Great Escape	Herself	English	Host
2016	Shockers	Unnamed	Hindi	Episode: "Home At Last"
2018	Smoke	Tara	Hindi	
2019–2023	Made in Heaven	Faiza Naqvi	English	
2019	Sacred Games	Batya Abelman	Hindi	Season 2
2019	Bhram	Alisha Khanna	Hindi	A Zee5 series
2025	Bhay: The Gaurav Tiwari Mystery	Irene Venkat	Hindi	An Amazon Prime series

=== Short films ===
Year	Title	Role	Language	Ref.
2017	Naked	Sandy	Hindi; English	
2017	The Thought of You	K	English	
2018	The Job	French expat	English; French	
