= India Backbone Implementation Network =

Fix two CS1 errors: "generic name" (Business Line citation had publisher names in author fields) and "multiple names in authors list" (comma inside first1 for the Planning Commission citation); standardise organisational-author citations to use author1=; fix backwards GIZ citation; fix duplicated "knowledge" and a missing-verb sentence ("have also been by" → "have also been established by"); tone down peacock/essay-style wording and tag an unsourced superlative claim about

IbIn (pronounced as ‘Ib’+’in’) stands for India Backbone Implementation Network. Conceived during the creation of the 12th Five Year Plan, IbIn's objective is to systematically promote capabilities that ensure coordination, collaboration, and implementation on issues, projects and policy within India. These capabilities include stakeholder alignment, project management, and policy advisory, all of which require technical skills for the process as well as domain knowledge of the specific subject matter or sector. Since no single entity can provide all these skills and knowledge, IbIn is designed as a network that will cross-share and cross-link this information by leveraging partner organizations.

== Background ==
India has significant growth potential but faces several constraints. A study of the root causes for why projects in India "get stuck" highlighted issues such as conflicting interests among stakeholders and poor coordination between agencies. As a result, implementation failures exist at many levels: at the centre, in the states, and in districts and cities. To address these challenges, the 12th Five Year Plan identified the need for a "backbone organization", which led to the conceptualization of IbIn.

The concept was developed through discussions within the country on the root causes of coordination and implementation failures, and through examination of coordination and implementation methods adopted by other countries. It was then presented for review to an international panel of experts in national development strategies, consisting of Dani Rodrik and Ricardo Hausmann (Harvard Kennedy School of Public Policy), Charles Sabel (Columbia Law School), Francis Fukuyama (Stanford University) and Mushtaq Khan (University of London). IbIn was launched in April 2013 as a Planning Commission initiative under the leadership of Arun Maira and anchored by India@75. The IbIn website was launched in August 2013.

== The 'IbIn Way' ==
Lack of multi-stakeholder alignment is one of the main reasons for poor implementation in a cooperative setup. In a diverse country such as India, this alignment cannot be achieved by either imposing authority or appointing selected 'experts' to find a solution to be imposed on the rest. An alternative approach is to encourage all stakeholders toward an open exploration of a common objective. Since such an open and deliberative process can be difficult to manage, the IbIn approach emphasizes the use of established processes.

== Structure of the IbIn movement ==
The movement is modeled on the Total Quality Management (TQM) approach used in Japanese manufacturing. The IbIn movement has been envisaged as a backbone network structure.

Since IbIn is modeled as a network, it uses a mechanism to disseminate its capabilities by establishing 'nodes'. A node is a structural unit within another larger organization that promotes the use of IbIn processes and capabilities.

Each node aims to bring three types of partners together. Partners either possess technical skills (known as 'enablers') or the ability to dedicate resources, such as financial, human, or knowledge resources (known as 'sponsors'). The network also includes organizations that generate demand for IbIn capabilities and help spread awareness of them (known as 'Channels').

The IbIn cell is the first node of the IbIn movement. Its core group consists of 7–8 professionals under the mentorship of Arun Maira. The IbIn cell is endorsed by the Planning Commission but is based outside the official government structure, at India@75.

== IbIn activities ==
=== Projects ===
The IbIn cell facilitates multi-stakeholder engagement on contentious issues such as industrial relations and affordable healthcare. It is also involved in projects that promote good practices, such as a business regulatory framework for India and aspirations for elderly healthcare.

=== Capability building ===
The IbIn cell is developing an India-centric toolbox to build capabilities in managing cooperation systems.

=== Match-making/node formation ===
Several nodes have also been established by the IbIn cell to build specific capabilities in diverse areas:

- PCMD division of Planning Commission: The Planning-Coordinating-Managing Division (PCMD) works on initiatives such as policy coherence and a think tank for policy formulation.
- NIESBUD at Ministry of MSME: The National Institute for Entrepreneurship and Small Business Development (NIESBUD) anchors a cluster stimulation cell for accelerated cluster growth, supported by the Ministry of MSME.
- Department of Industrial Policy and Promotion (DIPP): DIPP anchors the business regulatory ratings initiative with support from the Planning Commission. Under this initiative, states are ranked on ease of doing business, and good practices are promoted across states for improvement.
- Sakal-Pemandu: PEMANDU and Sakal formed a 50:50 joint venture to launch the 'Delivering Maharashtra' program. Senior politicians from multiple parties took part, and "planning labs" began in early 2014. Other Indian states have also explored applying the PEMANDU methodology.
- Bangalore Baptist Hospital: The BBH anchors an initiative for elderly healthcare.
