= Tata Administrative Service =

Leadership development programme of the Tata Group

TAS (Tata Administrative Service) is the leadership development programme of the Tata Group, one of India's largest conglomerates. Established in 1956 by JRD Tata, the programme is designed to identify, train, and develop general managers and future business leaders across the Tata Group's portfolio.

Some notable TAS managers include Xerxes Desai and Arun Maira.

== Recruitment process ==
The recruitment process for TAS involves multiple rounds of evaluation. TAS recruits MBA graduates from IIM Ahmedabad, IIM Bangalore, IIM Calcutta, S. P. Jain Institute of Management and Research (SPJIMR), FMS Delhi, IIM Lucknow, IIFT Delhi, and XLRI Apart from campus recruitment, there are other pathways to join: the in-house track for Tata group employees and the national level competition - Tata Imagination Challenge.

== Notable people ==
Several TAS managers have held senior leadership positions in Tata group as well as in other corporates and diverse sectors. Many of the TAS alumni have build influential careers outside the group.

- Xerxes Desai, Founder and Managing Director of Titan Company
- Arun Maira, Member of India's Planning Commission and former Chairman of Boston Consulting Group India
- Siddarth Kak, Television Presenter
- Raghuram Rajan, Former RBI Governor, joined but left TAS after short stint
