= Living Room (2015 play) =

Indian play by Kalki Koechlin

- Original language: English
- Written by: Kalki Koechlin
- Characters: Death, Mrs. Anna Nil, Grandson, Doctor
- Setting: A living room

Premiere
- Date: 2015
- Place: Stein Auditorium, India Habitat Centre, New Delhi

Living Room or The Living Room, is a 2015 Indian play written and directed by actress and playwright Kalki Koechlin, which premiered at Ranga Shankara Hall, Bangalore, in July 2015. The play that marked the directorial debut of Koechlin, stars Neil Bhoopalam and Sheeba Chaddha in lead roles with Jim Sarbh and Tariq Vasudeva playing supporting roles. The play opened to positive response from critics.

== Plot ==
The play opens with Death personified as a man (Neil Bhoopalam), standing in a living room nearby Mrs Anna Nil (Sheeba Chaddha), an elderly woman who is asleep, to wake up and discover that death is nearing her. Also present in her room are her Grandson, (Jim Sarbh), and a whiny and complaining Doctor (Tariq Vasudeva) who later transforms into a hub of the tale. The play follows conversations between the characters that carry humour and several underlying messages on life and death.

== Cast ==
- Neil Bhoopalam as Death
- Sheeba Chaddha as Mrs Anna Nil, an old woman on her deathbed
- Jim Sarbh as Nil's Grandson
- Tariq Vasudeva as a Doctor

== Production ==
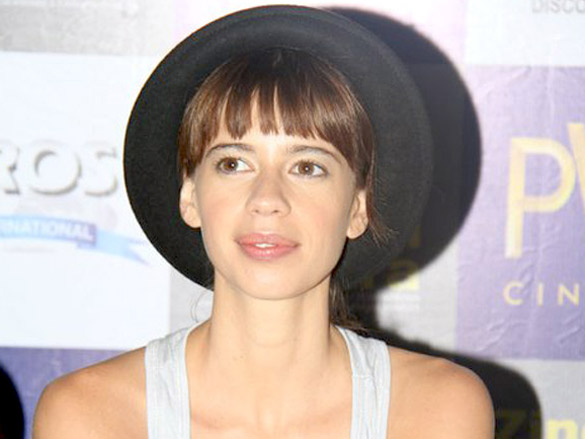
Film and stage actress Kalki Koechlin made her directorial debut with the play

The play marked the directorial debut of actress and screenwriter Kalki Koechlin, who had previously written and acted in several stage productions in India. Development of the play began in 2014, when Koechlin wrote a four-page conversation between Death and an old woman who is in a strange surreal space, about to die but unwilling to exit the world. She further worked on the script of the play in 2015. In an interview with Mumbai Mirror she said, "Last year, when I was unemployed for six months, I started fleshing out the story. It turned into a comedy on life and death".

The play stars Neil Bhoopalam as the incarnation of Death, Sheeba Chaddha as the protagonist Mrs Anna Nil, an old woman who is on her deathbed and confronts Death. Jim Sarbh and Tariq Vasudeva play supporting roles of Nil's grandson and a doctor in the play. On the casting process Koechlin said, "There's no role for me. I can't play an old woman, can I? So I just went to my ideal cast and fortunately for me,[...] gave me the nod after a reading."

== Release ==
Koechlin shared the poster of Living Room on Twitter writing, "Here it is! The poster for our opening show! @bombayfilmfactory". The play screened at the Ranga Shankara Hall, Bangalore, on 24 July 2015. The play opened to international audiences at the Old World Theatre Festival on 10 October 2015 it the Stein Auditorium, India Habitat Centre, New Delhi. The play premiered at the opening of the theatre festival.

== Reception ==
The play opened to positive reviews from the critics.
