= List of awards and nominations received by Kalki Koechlin =

Kalki Koechlin awards and nominations
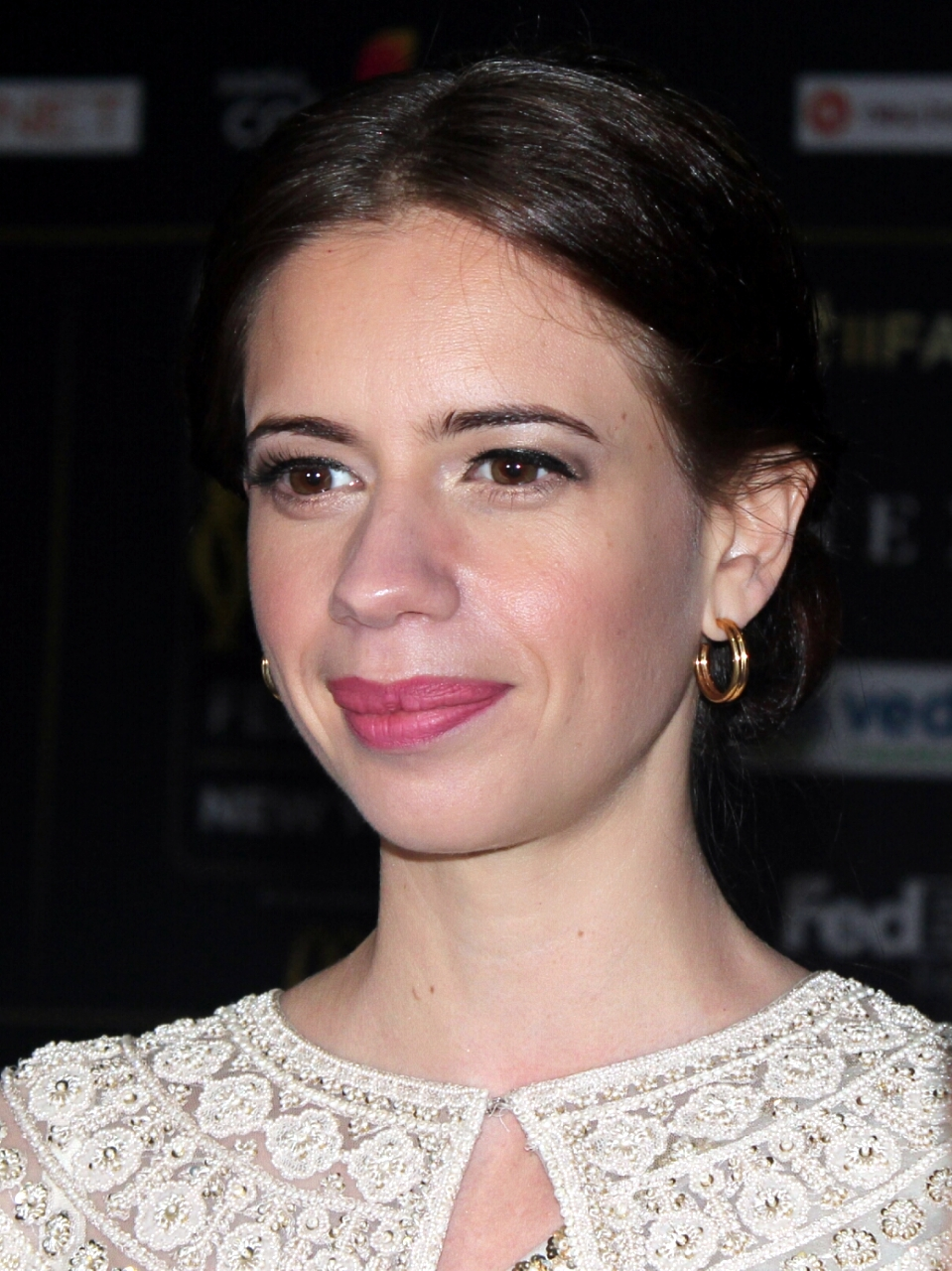
- Koechlin at the IIFA Awards in 2017
Award	Wins	Nominations
Awards	12	18

Kalki Koechlin is a French actress and writer, who works primarily in Bollywood and theater productions in India. Her work has garnered her such accolades as a National Film Award, a Filmfare Award, The Hindu Metroplus Playwright Award, and two Screen Awards among others. She was conferred with the Knight of the Order of Arts and Letters by the French Minister of Culture for her contributions to the field of arts.

== Awards and nominations ==
Year	Film	Award	Category	Result	Ref.
2009	Skeleton Woman	MetroPlus Playwright Award	Best English Theatre Script	Won	
2010	Dev.D	Filmfare Awards	Best Supporting Actress	Won	
2010	Dev.D	Producers Guild Film Awards	Best Actress in a Supporting Role	Nominated	
2010	Dev.D	International Indian Film Academy Awards	Best Supporting Actress	Nominated	
2012	Zindagi Na Milegi Dobara	International Indian Film Academy Awards	Best Supporting Actress	Nominated	
2012	Zindagi Na Milegi Dobara	Filmfare Awards	Best Supporting Actress	Nominated	
2012	Zindagi Na Milegi Dobara	Screen Awards	Best Ensemble Cast	Won	
2012	Shaitan	Screen Awards	Best Ensemble Cast	Nominated	
2012	Shaitan	Screen Awards	Best Actress	Nominated	
2012	Shaitan	Screen Awards	Best Villain	Nominated	
2012	Shaitan	Stardust Awards	Best Actress	Nominated	
2014	Yeh Jawaani Hai Deewani	Filmfare Awards	Best Supporting Actress	Nominated	
2014	Yeh Jawaani Hai Deewani	International Indian Film Academy Awards	Best Supporting Actress	Nominated	
2014	Yeh Jawaani Hai Deewani	Screen Awards	Best Supporting Actress	Nominated	
2014	Yeh Jawaani Hai Deewani	Producers Guild Film Awards	Best Actress in a Supporting Role	Nominated	
2016	Margarita with a Straw	Tallinn Black Nights Film Festival	Best Actress	Won	
2016	Margarita with a Straw	Asian Film Awards	Best Actress	Nominated	
2016	Margarita with a Straw	Golden Space Needle Awards	Best Actress	Runner-up	
2016	Margarita with a Straw	Screen Awards	Best Actress (Critics)	Won	
2016	Margarita with a Straw	Screen Awards	Best Actress	Nominated	
2016	Margarita with a Straw	Times of India Film Awards	Best Actress (Critics)	Won	
2016	Margarita with a Straw	National Film Awards	Special Jury Award	Won	

== Other awards ==
Koechlin was conferred with the Knight of the Order of Arts and Letters by the French government in June, 2018.
