= Made In India: A Titan Story =

2026 Indian television series

- Genre: Biographical drama
- Based on: Titan: Inside India's Most Successful Consumer Brand by Vinay Kamath
- Written by: Kandarp Shroff; Karan Vyas; Niraj Dasa
- Directed by: Robbie Grewal
- Starring: Jim Sarbh; Naseeruddin Shah; Vaibhav Tatwawadi; Namita Dubey; Lakshvir Saran; Ashwath Bhatt
- Composer: Abhishek Nailwal
- Country of origin: India
- Original language: Hindi
- No. of seasons: 1
- No. of episodes: 6

Production
- Executive producer: Sudhir Narayan Sherigar
- Producers: Prabhleen Sandhu; Bhushan Kumar; Krishan Kumar
- Cinematography: Aditya Kapur
- Editors: Akash Bundhoo; Nibedya Samal
- Camera setup: Multi-camera
- Production companies: Almighty Motion Picture; T-Series Films

Original release
- Network: Amazon MX Player
- Release: 3 June 2026 – present

Made in India: A Titan Story is a 2026 Indian Hindi-language biographical drama streaming television series directed by Robbie Grewal. Based on Vinay Kamath's book Titan: Inside India's Most Successful Consumer Brand, the series chronicles the rise of Titan Company and the individuals who transformed it into one of India's most successful consumer brands. The series stars Jim Sarbh, Naseeruddin Shah alongside Vaibhav Tatwawadi, Namita Dubey, and Lakshvir Saran in supporting roles. It premiered on Amazon MX Player on 3 June 2026 and received positive reviews for its performances, writing, and portrayal of India's corporate history.

== Synopsis ==
Set in 1978 Bombay, Made in India: A Titan Story chronicles the rise of Titan through the vision of Xerxes Desai and Akash Dikshit, who sought to challenge India's smuggler-dominated watch market by building a world-class Indian brand. Facing bureaucratic obstacles, financial crisis, and repeated setbacks, the team transforms an ambitious idea into a national success. However, a risky overseas expansion pushes Titan to the brink of collapse, forcing its founders to stake everything on one final innovation that could either save the company or end their dream forever.

== Cast ==
- Jim Sarbh as Xerxes Desai
- Naseeruddin Shah as JRD Tata
- Vaibhav Tatwawadi as Akash Dixit
- Namita Dubey as Rajni Desai
- Lakshvir Saran as Gaurav Dhar
- Kaveri Seth as Megha Mhatre
- Joy Sengupta as S K Gopalan
- Ashwath Bhatt as Shankar Manoharan
- Paresh Ganatra as Ravindra / Devendra Naik
- Viraf Patel as Murli Shankar Dalmia
- Prateeksha Lonkar as Sudha
- Shilpa Iyer as Pooja
- Satyen Chaturvedi as AJ Kumar "AJK"
- Rupali Arte as Pinks
- Ankith Madhav as Sameer Reddy
- Beila Gupta as Thelma
- Rahul Dev as Mastaan Bhai

== Episodes ==
=== Season 1 ===
Series	Episodes	Originally released
1	6	3 June 2026

No.	Title	Directed by	Original release date
1	"The Watch Project"	Robbie Grewal	3 June 2026
2	"Demonstration"	Robbie Grewal	3 June 2026
3	"Flying Saucer"	Robbie Grewal	3 June 2026
4	"The Real Value"	Robbie Grewal	3 June 2026
5	"Universal Value"	Robbie Grewal	3 June 2026
6	"Twenty Two"	Robbie Grewal	3 June 2026

== Release ==
The series premiered on 3 June 2026 on Amazon MX Player.

== Reception ==
Rahul Desai of The Hollywood Reporter India called it "The feel-good watch of the year" and writes that "there’s something about A Titan Story. It may be privileged and blessed with plenty, but it’s also undeniably talented and entertaining." Shubhra Gupta of The Indian Express gave 3 stars out of 5 and writes that "Yes, it’s bygone, but the qualities it endorses are timeless: the Titan story, a branding and marketing triumph, is inspiring, and the show remains watchable despite those quibbles, bookended by wonderful performances from Shah and Sarbh."

Sukanya Verma of Rediff.com observed that "Where Made in India's docudrama scores is its feel-good sincerity." Anurag Singh Bohra of India Today gave 3.5 stars out of 5 and said that "If you grew up seeing Titan ads and believing in “Made in India” before it became a slogan, this one will hit differently. Warm, human, and quietly inspiring." Abhishek Srivastava of The Times of India rated it 4/5 stars and writes that "Made in India - A Titan Story leaves an impression as it pays equal attention to its smaller moments as much as its larger achievements."

Vinamra Mathur of Firstpost also gave 4 stars out of 5 and writes that "It may be an imperfect show, but something that also happens to be a crucial and fun ‘watch.’ No pun intended here!" Bollywood Hungama rated 4/5 stars and said that "MADE IN INDIA: A TITAN STORY is a brilliantly made show that tells a fascinating story not many are aware of. The performances by Jim Sarbh, Naseeruddin Shah and the rest of the cast are the icing on the cake."

Rachit Gupta writing for Filmfare also gave 4 stars out of 5 and praise the performance of the cast and writes that "Made In India: A Titan Story is at its best a warm, well-intentioned love letter to the spirit of Indian enterprise, to the men and women who believed, in the face of Swiss scepticism and domestic bureaucracy, that India could put a world-class watch on the world's wrist." Agnivo Niyogi writing for The Telegraph stated that "In theory, this show doesn't have the ingredients of a traditional underdog story. Yet, much to its credit, Made in India: A Titan Story turns out to be far more engaging than expected."
