= Fatso! =

- Promotional release poster
- Directed by: Rajat Kapoor
- Produced by: Pritish Nandy; Fauzia Arshi
- Starring: Ranvir Shorey; Gul Panag; Purab Kohli; Neil Bhoopalam; Gunjan Bakshi; Brijendra Kala
- Production companies: Pritish Nandy Communications, Daily Multimedia Limited
- Release date: 4 May 2012
- Country: India
- Language: Hindi
- Budget: ₹90 million (US$1.1 million)

Fatso! is a 2012 Indian film directed by Rajat Kapoor and starring Ranvir Shorey, Gul Panag, Purab Kohli, Neil Bhoopalam, and Gunjan Bakshi, with a key role played by veteran comic character actor Brijendra Kala. The film is produced by Pritish Nandy and Fauzia Arshi. The movie was released on 4 May 2012 under the Pritish Nandy Communications and Daily Multimedia Limited (Fauzia Arshi) banner.

This 2012 Hindi film's main plot device is similar to the Hollywood films Shallow Hal (2001), Heaven Can Wait (1978), and Here Comes Mr. Jordan (1941), the latter two of which were in turn based on a Broadway stageplay from the 1930s – by the noted playwright Harry Segall – also entitled Heaven Can Wait.

== Premise ==
The story is based on five friends: two young couples Nandini (Gul Panag) and Navin (Purab Kohli), Yash (Neil Bhoopalam) and Tanuja (Gunjan Bakshi), plus their mutual buddy, the hugely overweight Sudeep (Ranvir Shorey). Nandini and Navin are about to get married when disaster strikes. On their way home from Navin's bachelor party, the three boys—Navin, Yash, and Sudeep—are involved in a car crash where one of them is killed. An angel named Vijay (Brijendra Kala) escorts Navin to heaven. When Navin wakes up in heaven, however, he discovers to his horror that through a clerical error Vijay had collected the wrong soul from the accident site: it was Sudeep, not Navin, who was destined to have died in the car crash.

Navin makes a scene in the overcrowded waiting room of heaven and demands that he be returned to earth, and to his loved ones. But by this time Navin's body back on earth has already been destroyed. So the angel Vijay arranges for Navin's soul to return to earth into Sudeep's body. Now trapped in the body of "Fatso" Sudeep, Navin has to woo his beloved fiancée Nandini all over again.

== Cast ==
- Ranvir Shorey as Sudeep
- Gul Panag as Nandini
- Purab Kohli as Navin
- Neil Bhoopalam as Yash
- Gunjan Bakshi as Tanuja
- Brijendra Kala as Vijay, the Angel
