= Xerxes Desai =

Indian businessman (1937–2016)

- Born: 1937
- Died: 27 June 2016 (aged 78–79); Bengaluru, Karnataka, India
- Education: Elphinstone College; Mumbai University; Oxford University
- Known for: First managing director of Titan Company
- Spouse: Rajni Desai

Xerxes Desai (1937 – 27 June 2016) was an Indian businessman who served as the first managing director of Titan Company, an Indian watchmaking company, where he played an instrumental role in laying the foundation of the company.

== Early life and education ==
Born in a Parsi family, Desai was a graduate of Elphinstone College (Mumbai University) and Oxford University.

== Career ==
Desai joined Tata Administrative Services in 1961 after graduation, working at several of their companies. He founded Titan as a joint venture with JRD Tata in 1986, with support from the Tamil Nadu Industrial Development Corporation. He had suggested the idea of a watchmaking company to Tata in the 1970s, who liked it, but bureaucratic hassles took time till the company was opened in 1986 in Hosur.

In 1994, Desai challenged engineers at Titan to design the world's thinnest watch, with a movement 1.15mm thick inside a 3.5mm case. The watch, called the Titan Edge was introduced in 2002.

After Titan's success, Desai founded Tanishq, a jewelry brand. He had innovative ideas like asking people in Bangalore to get their jewelry appraised in 1999. The jewelry business grew over time, after a slow start.

Desai retired in 2002, and was succeeded by his protégé Bhaskar Bhat.

== Later years and death ==
Desai was awarded a Lifetime Achievement award by the National Institute of Design during its 4th Design Excellence Awards in 2006.

After his retirement, Desai was a part of the Indian Institute for Human Settlements (IIHS) initiative by Nandan Nilekani.

Desai died from illness on 27 June 2016, aged 79, in Bangalore, where he had lived for 30 years.

== In popular culture ==
In 2026, Xerxes Desai was portrayed by Jim Sarbh in the biographical drama series Made In India: A Titan Story. The series chronicles the founding and growth of Titan and depicts Desai's role in building the company alongside JRD Tata.
