= Jim Sarbh =

Indian actor (born 1987)

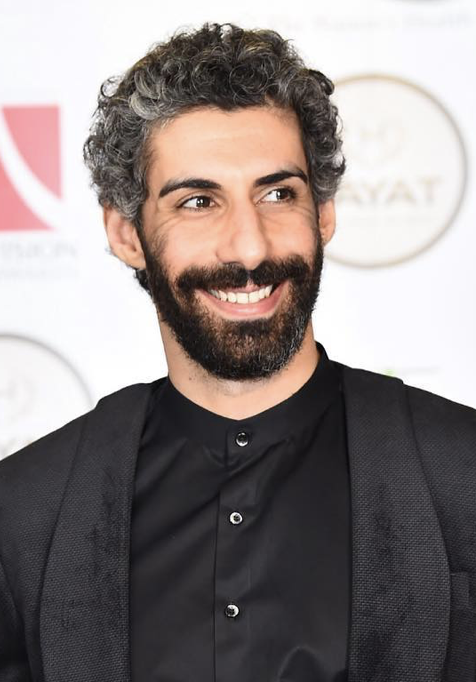
- Sarbh in 2018
- Born: Jim Sarbh; 27 August 1987 (age 39); Bombay, Maharashtra, India
- Education: American School of Bombay
- Alma mater: Emory University
- Occupations: Actor, theatre director
- Years active: 2010–present

Jim Sarbh (born 27 August 1987) is an Indian actor known for his work in films and stage productions. He has received several awards including a Filmfare OTT Award, and an IIFA Award with a nomination for an International Emmy Award. Additionally, he has directed and acted in numerous theatre productions in India.

Sarbh made his feature film debut as the antagonist in the critically and commercially successful biopic Neerja (2016), which garnered him positive reviews from critics and such accolades as a Filmfare Award for Best Supporting Actor nomination and a Screen Award. He rose to prominence for playing antagonistic roles in the period drama Padmaavat (2018) and the biopic Sanju (2018). He was also a part of films like A Death in the Gunj (2017), Gangubai Kathiawadi (2022) and Mrs. Chatterjee vs Norway (2023). In 2022, he played Dr. Homi Bhabha in the series Rocket Boys, for which he earned several accolades including a Best Actor nomination at 51st International Emmy Awards.

In addition to his film career, Sarbh has regularly appeared in theatre productions, particularly those based in Mumbai. He has attracted attention for his performances in the 2013 revival of Death of a Salesman, Rajat Kapoor's What's Done is Done, and Kalki Koechlin's Living Room. He made his directorial debut in 2014 with Bull. For his extensive work in theatre, Sarbh was listed in Forbes India's 30 under 30 list in 2015.

== Personal life ==
Jim Sarbh was born on 27 August 1987 in Bombay, Maharashtra, India into a Parsi Zoroastrian family. His mother is a retired physiotherapist, and his father is a former master mariner, and the Regional Director of P&O Ports South and Middle East Asia. The family moved to Australia when Sarbh was three years old and came back to Bombay when he was eight, where he first attended Bombay International School in South Mumbai and then the American School of Bombay in Bandra, West Mumbai. He completed his undergraduate degree in Psychology from the Emory University in Atlanta, Georgia, United States. He currently lives in Versova, Mumbai.

== Career ==
=== Theatre roles and Hindi cinema debut (2009–2016) ===
After graduating from Emory University, Sarbh worked with the Alliance Theatre in Atlanta for a year as a literary intern. He performed around Atlanta in the 2009 productions of such plays as The Show!, The Breakup, Tennis in Nablus, and Ice Glen; the last of the roles won him a Major Supporting Role Metropolitan Atlanta Theatre Award. Sarbh moved back to Mumbai in 2012 and began acting in local theatre productions. His performance as Happy Loman in Alyque Padamsee's 2013 revival of Death of a Salesman drew the attention of several commentators. Sarbh continued to act in Mumbai-based plays including Rajat Kapoor's What's Done is Done, Rage Productions's The Glass Menagerie, Vickram Kapadia's The Merchant of Venice, Kalki Koechlin's Living Room, and later made his directorial and writing debut with the 2014 production Bull and Eat respectively. He was listed in Forbes India's 30 under 30 list in 2015 for his contributions to the Mumbai theatre industry.

Sarbh made his feature film debut with Ram Madhvani's 2016 biographical drama film Neerja. He had two other releases in 2016–Jyoti Patil's Yashodhara and Daria Gai's 3 ½ Takes. He also worked on the short films Mama’s Boys by Akshat Verma, and Like Summer Like Rain by Gouri Dutt.

=== Continued film career (2017–present) ===
Sarbh had two Bollywood releases in 2017–the thriller A Death in the Gunj and the romance film Raabta. The production was screened at various film festivals across Europe. He played the role of Malik Kafur in Sanjay Leela Bhansali's 2018 epic romance Padmaavat, featuring alongside Shahid Kapoor, Deepika Padukone and Ranveer Singh. In 2019, he had a role in the Netflix film House Arrest, and the following year featured in Yeh Ballet, another Netflix film.

In 2020, he appeared in Bejoy Nambiar's Taish that released on ZEE5 in October.

In 2022, he appeared in the film Gangubai Kathiawadi as Amin Faizi, the webseries Rocket Boys as Homi J. Bhabha and Eternally Confused and Eager for Love as a Wiz, a voiceover.

== Filmography ==
=== Films ===
Year	Film	Role
2014	Shuruaat Ka Interval	Vaz
2016	Neerja	Khalil
2016	Yashodhara	
2016	3 and 1/2 takes	
2017	A Death in the Gunj	Brian McKenzie
2017	Raabta	Zack Merchant/Qaabir
2017	Teen Aur Aadha	Natraj
2018	Padmaavat	Malik Kafur
2018	Sanju	Zubin Mistry
2018	The Wedding Guest	Deepesh
2018	Jonaki	Lover
2019	Sometimes, I Think About Dying	Robert
2019	Photograph	Rajveer
2019	House Arrest	Jamshed Daneja
2020	Taish	Rohan Karla
2020	Yeh Ballet	Academy Head
2020	Beneath a Sea of Lights	Jimmy
2021	The Tales of Boo Boo and Cuddly Poo	Himself
2022	Gangubai Kathiawadi	Hamid Fezi
2023	Mrs. Chatterjee vs Norway	Daniel Singh Ciupek
2025	Pune Highway	Vishnu
2025	Kuberaa	Neeraj
2025	Inspector Zende	Carl Bhojraj
2027	Amri	Karl Khandalavala

=== Web series ===
Year	Name	Role	Channel	Notes
2018	Smoke	Roy	Eros Now	
2019	Made in Heaven	Adil Khanna	Amazon Prime Video	
2019	Flip	Keki	Eros Now	Episode: "Massage"
2022	Eternally Confused and Eager for Love	Wiz	Netflix	
2022	Rocket Boys	Homi J. Bhabha	SonyLIV	
2022	Four More Shots Please	Sean Lobo	Amazon Prime Video	
2026	Made In India: A Titan Story	Xerxes Desai	Amazon MX Player	

=== Music videos ===
Year	Title	Artist	Notes
2018	"Cold/Mess"	Prateek Kuhad	

=== Short films ===
Year	Title	Channel	Notes
2017	Akshat Varma		
2021	Like Summer Like Rain		
2023	Next, Please		
2025	"The Promise"		
2025	"The Badminton"		

== Awards and nominations ==
Year	Film	Award	Category	Result	Ref.
2017	Neerja	Filmfare Awards	Best Supporting Actor	Nominated	
2017	Neerja	International Indian Film Academy Awards	Best Actor In a Negative Role	Won	
2017	Neerja	Screen Awards	Best Male Debut	Won	
2017	Neerja	Stardust Awards	Best Actor in a Negative Role	Won	
2017	Neerja	Zee Cine Awards	Best Actor in a Negative Role	Won	
2017	Neerja	Zee Cine Awards	Best Male Debutant	Won	
2019	Padmaavat	Asiavision Awards	Best Actor in a Negative Role	Won	
2019	Padmaavat	Filmfare Awards	Best Supporting Actor	Nominated	
2019	Padmaavat	International Indian Film Academy Awards	Best Supporting Actor	Nominated	
2019	Padmaavat	Zee Cine Awards	Best Actor in a Supporting Role – Male	Nominated	
2022	Rocket Boys	Filmfare OTT Awards	Best Actor in a (Drama Series)	Nominated	
2022	Rocket Boys	Filmfare OTT Awards	Best Actor in a Drama Series (Critics)	Won	
2023	Rocket Boys	International Emmy Awards	Best Actor	Nominated	
2023	Rocket Boys (season 2)	2023 Filmfare OTT Awards	Best Actor in a (Drama Series)	Nominated	
