= Kalki's Great Escape =

- Genre: Travel
- Starring: Kalki Koechlin; Joel Koechlin
- Country of origin: India

Original release
- Network: Fox Life
- Release: 18 September 2016 – present

Kalki's Great Escape is an Indian travel television show that premiered on Fox Life on 17 September 2016 at 8 p.m. IST. The show is hosted by actor Kalki Koechlin.

Kalki's Great Escape focusses on the bike journey of Koechlin and her father, Joel Koechlin, through Northeast India, exploring the cultures of Assam, Meghalaya and Arunachal Pradesh. Koechlin and her father covered a journey of nearly 4,000 kilometres (2,500 mi) riding on a Royal Enfield Himalayan Bike.
