= Tanishq =

Indian jewellery brand

- Type: Subsidiary
- Industry: Jewellers
- Founded: 1994; 32 years ago
- Headquarters: Bengaluru, Karnataka, India
- Area served: Worldwide
- Parent: Titan Company
- Website: www.tanishq.co.in

Tanishq is an Indian jewellery brand owned by Titan Company. Founded in 1994, it is based in Bengaluru. As of 2023, it has more than 400 retail stores across India, the UAE, the US, Singapore and Qatar.

== History ==
By the end of the 1980s, Titan launched Tanishq, which focused largely on exports to European and American markets, in an attempt to increase its foreign exchange reserves. In the early 1990s, India's exchange crisis was resolved, and Titan Company shifted the focus of the brand to the Indian market. A pilot plant was set up in August 1992 and the production began in 1994, and Tanishq's first store opened in 1996 at Chennai Cathedral road. Tanishq was the first jewellery retail chain in India.

The first years of Tanishq recorded consistent losses. In 2000, Managing Director Xerxes Desai chose Bhaskar Bhat to succeed him. Starting in 2000, its net worth started to grow, and by 2003, Tanishq was among the top 5 retailers in India, and made up 40% of the Titan Company's revenue.

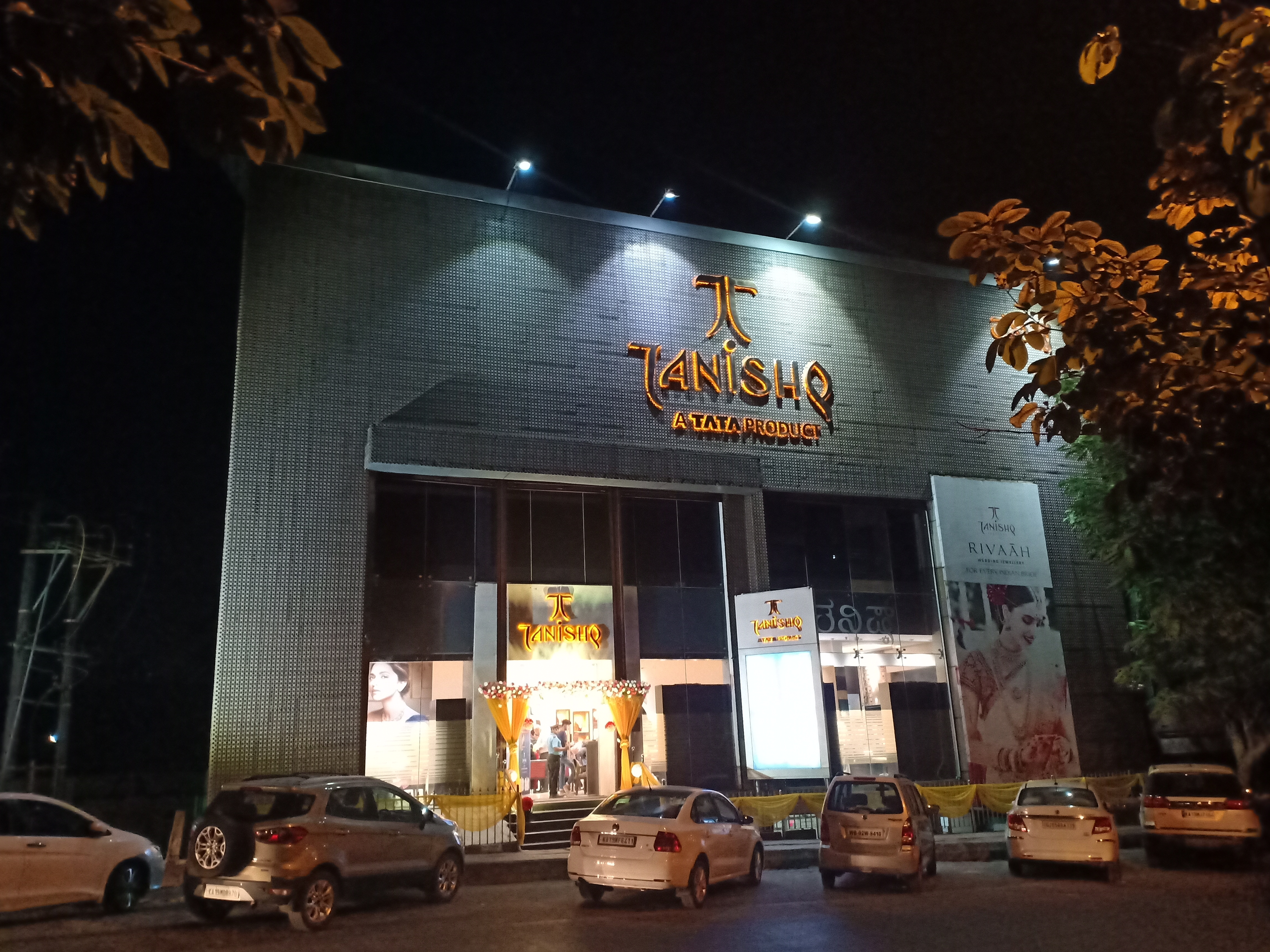
A Tanishq showroom in Mangalore.

Tanishq made the beauty pageant crowns for the Femina Miss India 2007. By 2008, Tanishq had 105 stores in 71 cities in India. In 2011, the Tanishq group launched the sub-brand called Mia for working women. In November 2012, Tanishq opened its 150th showroom in India.

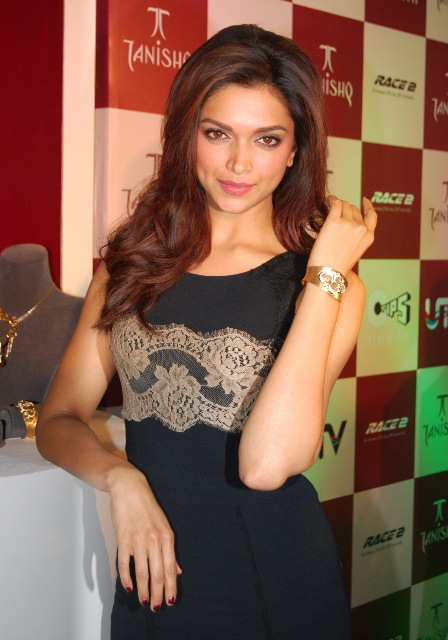
Deepika Padukone became the brand ambassador of Tanishq in 2015.

In 2017, Tanishq launched a sub-brand called Rivaah targeting the wedding segment. In January 2017, the Titan group merged its Gold Plus stores with the larger Tanishq retail brand. In April 2017, Tanishq launched the sub-brand Mirayah to cater to women under their 40s. In December 2017, Tanishq launched the Aveer line, its first line of products for men.

By December 2022, Tanishq had 385 retail stores in India and announced the opening of 45-50 stores by the end of 2023.

== International presence ==
In the late 2000s, Tanishq made its first attempt to go international with stores in the United States (at Chicago and New Jersey), but closed them after a few years. In 2020, in the middle of the COVID-19 pandemic, it opened its first store in Dubai. Since then, the brand has launched stores across UAE (Dubai, Abu Dhabi and Sharjah) as well as in USA, Qatar and Singapore. By the end of 2023, the brand had 13 stores outside of India.

=== Gulf region ===
The first international Tanishq store was opened in October 2020, in Dubai in the market area of Meena Bazar. Subsequently, the brand added stores in Dubai, Abu Dhabi and Sharjah. In 2023, the brand entered Qatar with two stores in Doha. In December 2024, Tanishq opened a boutique store in Dubai Gold Souk.

=== United States ===
In 2023, Tanishq opened its first store in New Jersey on Oak Tree Road, a shopping district for Indian goods and services. In 2023, it added two stores in Texas.

=== Singapore ===
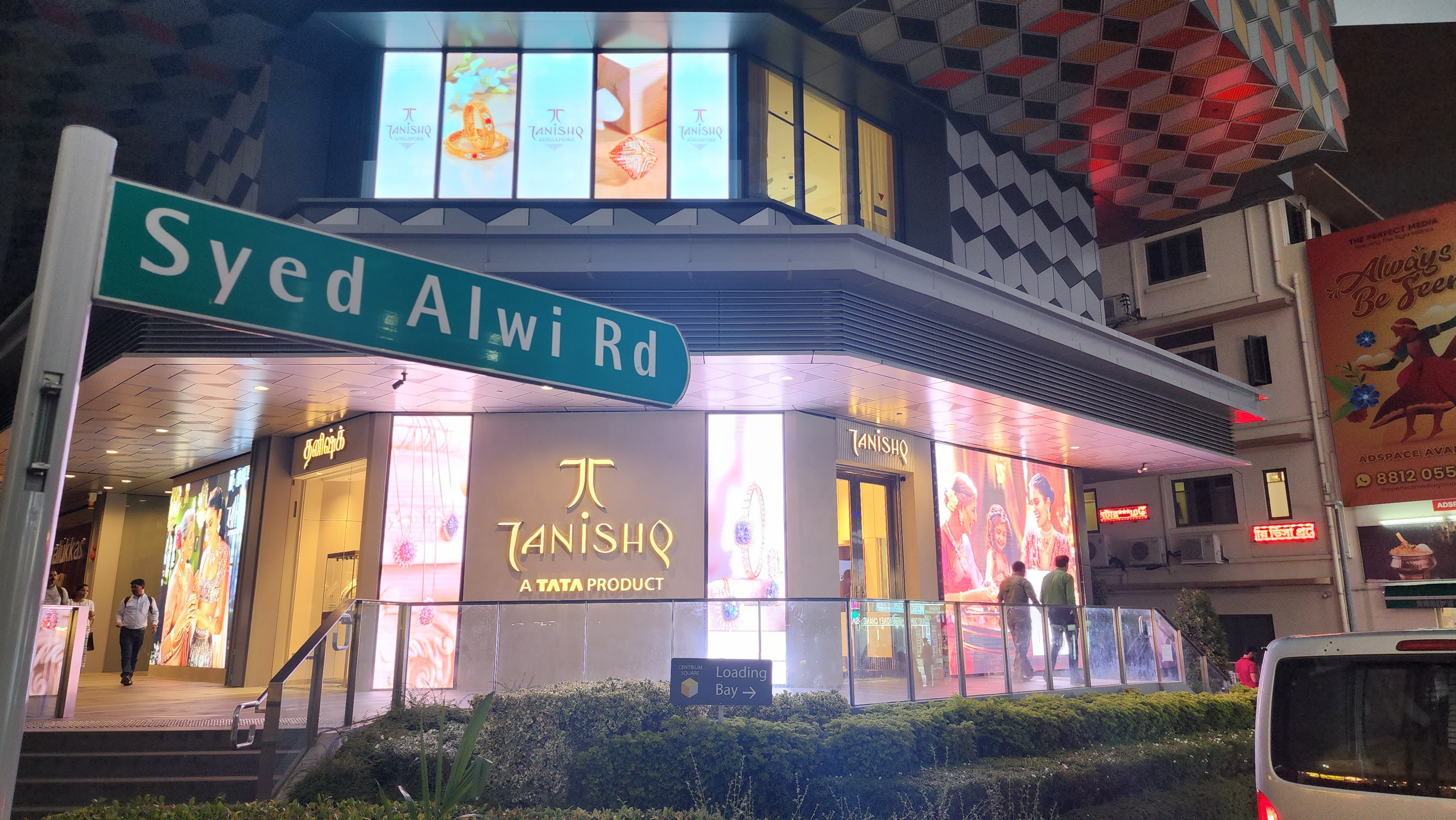
Tanishq store in Little India, Singapore.

On 4 November 2023, Tanishq launched a boutique store in Singapore at the intersection of Serangoon Road and Syed Alwi Road in Little India.

== Name ==
The name Tanishq was chosen by Titan's first managing director Xerxes Desai. The name was formed by combining the first two letters from "Ta" (means tata) and निष्क "NIṢK" (meaning gold ornament in Sanskrit), although the क k has been modified into a क़ q. According to another sources, the name is formed with the two words Tan (body) and Nishk (gold ornament) in the Sanskrit language, a name synonymous to superior craftsmen or absolute design.

== Controversies ==
In October 2020, a Tanishq commercial depicting an interfaith couple's baby shower sparked controversy on social media. As calls for a boycott intensified, the company stated that it had withdrawn the ad "keeping in mind hurt sentiments & well being of our employees". A month later, it withdrew another ad which had called for Diwali to be celebrated without firecrackers, owing to criticism on social media.
