= Smoke (Indian TV series) =

Indian web series

- Genre: Crime-thriller
- Written by: Vijay Maurya (dialogues)
- Screenplay by: Upendra Sidhaye
- Story by: Ayush Raina
- Directed by: Neel Guha
- Presented by: Eros International
- Starring: Tom Alter; Jim Sarbh; Kalki Koechlin; Mandira Bedi; Gulshan Devaiah; Amit Sial; Neil Bhoopalam; Satyadeep Misra; Prakash Belawadi; Kallirroi Tziafeta
- Country of origin: India
- Original language: Hindi

Production
- Producers: Faisal Malik (Prahlad Cha); Kumud Shahi
- Cinematography: Rohit Prabhu; Haresh Bhanushali; John Jacob Payyapalli
- Editors: Sankalp Meshram; Monisha R Baldawa
- Running time: 30-40 minutes
- Production companies: Eros Motion Pictures, Humari Film Company

Original release
- Network: Eros Now
- Release: 26 November 2018

Smoke is a 2018 Indian web series produced by Eros Motion Pictures and Humari Film Company. It was globally released on 26 October 2018, on Indian streaming platform Eros Now as an original series. The series is directed by Neel Guha.

== Cast ==
- Jim Sarbh as Roy
- Kalki Koechlin as Tara
- Mandira Bedi as Tia
- Gulshan Devaiah as Jairam Jha (JJ)
- Amit Sial as Pushkar
- Neil Bhoopalam as Savio
- Girish Kulkarni as CM Pavaskar
- Satyadeep Misra as ACP Pereira
- Prakash Belawadi as Bhau
- Ravi Kale as Reddy
- Naved Aslam as Ex CM
- Ganesh Yadav as S.I. Gune
- Kallirroi Tziafeta as Mimi
- Paniza Rahnama as Yana Duman
- Vasuki
- Luke Kenny
- Tom Alter as Moshe

== Festival screenings ==
Smoke premiered on MIPCOM 2018 in Cannes under the ‘Made in India Originals’ category on 15 October 2018.
