= Arun Maira =

Former member of Planning Commission of India

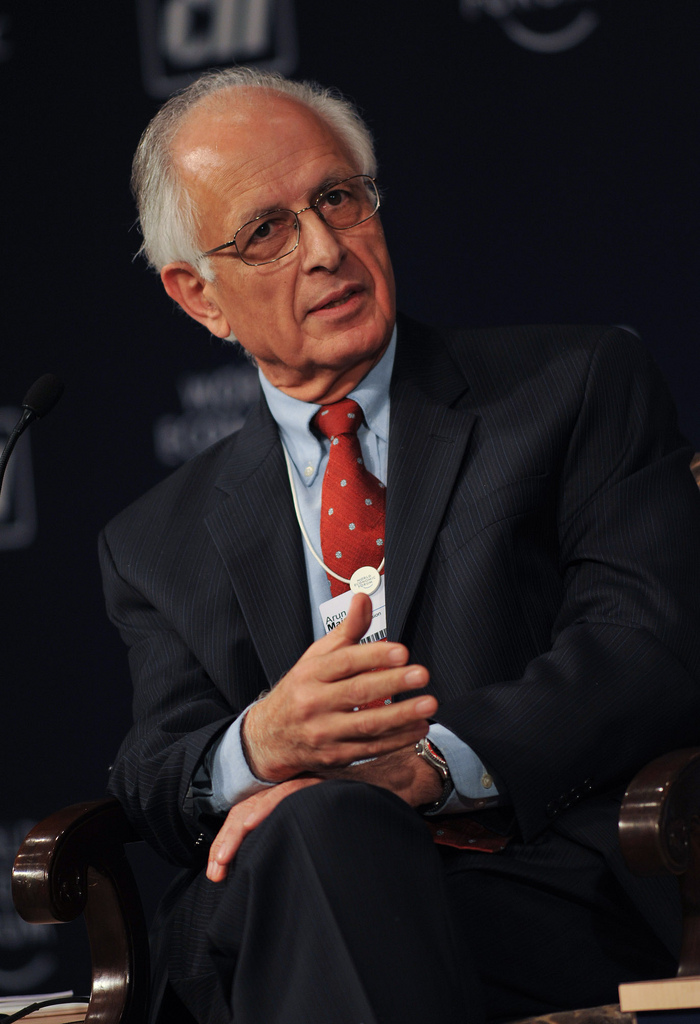
- Born: 15 August 1943 (age 82); Lahore, British India
- Occupations: Consultant; Management expert; Former Member, Planning Commission of India; Former Chairman, Boston Consulting Group, India; Former Chancellor, Central University of Himachal Pradesh

Arun Maira (born 15 August 1943) is a management consultant and former member of Planning Commission of India. He is also a former chairman of Boston Consulting Group, India.

== Early life ==
Arun Maira was born in Lahore. He received his M.Sc. and B.Sc. in physics from St Stephen's College, Delhi University.

== Career ==
Arun Maira was part of Tata Administrative Services for 25 years and held various positions in Tata Group until 1989. Maira was board member of Tata Motors from 1981 to 1989 and played an instrumental role in Tata Motors's entry into the LCV segment. He then worked at Arthur D. Little for 10 years where he was Leader of Global Organisation Practice and managing director of Innovation Associates, a subsidiary of Arthur D. Little. Maira served as the chairman of Boston Consulting Group in India from 2000 to April 2008. He was then appointed as a member of the Planning Commission of India in 2009. His focus here was on the development of strategies related to industrialisation and urbanisation.

Between 2000 and 2009, Arun Maira was on the boards of several companies which are listed below:

| Position Held | Company | Years |
|---|---|---|
| Former director, chairman of Shareholder & Investor Grievances Committee, member of Nominating & Governance Committee and member of Compensation & Remuneration Committee | Patni Computer Systems Limited | 2006–2009 |
| Former additional independent director | Aditya Birla Nuvo Limited | 2008–2009 |
| Former director | Tata Chemicals Ltd. | 2008–2009 |
| Former additional director | Mahindra Ugine Steel Company Limited | 2008–2009 |
| Former non-executive and independent director and member of audit committee | Hero MotoCorp Limited | 2008–2009 |
| Former additional director | Godrej Industries Ltd. | 2009–2009 |

Maira has also served as chairman of Axis Bank Foundation and Save the Children, India. He was also a board member of the India Brand Equity Foundation, the Indian Institute of Corporate Affairs, and the UN Global Compact, and WWF India.

== Bibliography ==
Maira has authored several books on leadership and organisation, including

- Remaking India - One Country, One Destiny
- Discordant Democrats
- Shaping the Future: Aspirational Leadership in India and Beyond
- Transforming Capitalism - Business Leadership to Improve the World
- Redesigning the Aeroplane While Flying: Reforming Institutions
