= Printing Machine =

Printing Machine is a 2016 video produced by Culture Machine, starring Indian actress Kalki Koechlin, that talks about the approach of media and society towards the crimes against women. The five-minute video was released on YouTube and feature a poem titled Printing Machine. The poem was written and performed by Koechlin and directed by Akanksha Seda. The music of the video was given by Ankur Shrivastava and the creative team included Joyna M Sequeira, Apurva Gabhe, Anissa Alia Malhotra, Disha Anand, and Mehul Vadodaria.

The video was met with rave reviews from critics.

== Content ==
The video focuses on the coverage of crimes against women and how the media tackles the issues relating these crimes.
