= Colour Blind (play) =

Stage play

Colour Blind is a stage play by Indian playwright Manav Kaul and Kalki Koechlin. It was screened at the Sir Mutha Venkata Subba Rao Hall in Chennai, in August 2014. It starred Koechlin, Satyajit Sharma in dual roles. The play is based on the life of Indian poet Rabindranath Tagore. In an interview Kaul stated that the play is "an attempt to see beyond the majestic Gurudev (Rabindranath Tagore) and discover the man through his relationships."
