= India Brand Equity Foundation =

- Type: Semi-Government
- Headquarters: New Delhi, India
- Key people: Ms. Kapil Chaudhary (CEO)
- Website: IBEF

India Brand Equity Foundation (IBEF) is a Trust established by the Department of Commerce, Ministry of Commerce and Industry, Government of India. IBEF's primary objective is to promote and create international awareness of the Made in India label in markets overseas and to facilitate the dissemination of knowledge of Indian products and services. Towards this objective, IBEF works closely with stakeholders across government and industry.

IBEF works as the branding and communication partner for India's participation at various global trade exhibitions. IBEF also manages onsite branding, media advertisements, public relations, Digital marketing, publishing reports and knowledge kits.

== History ==
India Brand Equity Foundation (IBEF) was established as a Trust in 1996 by the Department of Commerce, Ministry of Commerce and Industry, Government of India. Through its core promotional and branding activities, IBEF has contributed to creating awareness of the Made in India label and the country's business potential in overseas markets.

== Administration ==
IBEF works with a network of stakeholders both domestic and international to promote Brand India. It is headed by the Commerce Secretary with 14 other members representing the industry, trade, market, academia, media, advertising and publicity, and the government.

== Activities ==
IBEF undertakes brand-building activities to promote Indian exports, businesses, and the economy to the world. IBEF regularly tracks government announcements in policy, foreign investment, macroeconomic indicators and business trends. It also publishes state and sector reports.

IBEF publishes event information on the website, hosts multimedia content and provides business information reports on the Indian states and the export promotion councils.

IBEF participates in several global trade shows for the promotion of Indian exports in association with industry associations, export promotion councils and commodity boards.

== Branding Campaigns ==
IBEF has undertaken Sectoral Branding Initiatives and identified its areas of focus to be pharmaceuticals, engineering, services, plantations, leather, textiles, and carpets. The primary divisions of IBEF's Sectoral Branding Initiatives include:

=== Experience India: Branding Indian products ===
India's participation in Dubai Expo 2020 was promoted for handicraft, handloom and Agri products. Promotion of the District Export Hub scheme of commerce in UAE during the Expo 2020 was done. More than 60 prominent handicraft and handloom items were displayed for visitors inside the Indian Pavilion, various mall activities were organised in Dubai. A dedicated campaign was launched to promote products from various districts and states.

=== National Toy Campaign ===
To promote Indian Toys, the Vocal4IndianToys campaign was organised where multiple levels of promotions were launched for Indian toys. The campaign also included promoting Indian toys by means of digital campaigns that covered stories, origin and benefits of various Indian toys including GI toys like Rajasthan Kathputli and Channapatna toys.

=== Promotion of Indian Handloom ===
To promote Indian Handloom, a Handloom Anthem was launched on the occasion of National Handloom Day to support our weavers' community followed by a digital campaign. It was further retweeted by 302 plus bodies including the Department of Commerce, CIPAM, DPIIT, FICCI and Indian Embassies across the world.

=== Geographical Indications of India ===
To promote the regime of Vocal for Local, a campaign for GI of India was executed which extended for 6 months and showcased all-region, and state-wise GI products of India. The campaign included designing of an e-brochure for GI Products of India with a list of producers and manufacturers.

=== Brand India Pharma ===
Brand India Pharma is an initiative led by Pharmexcil (Pharmaceutical Export Promotion Council) and IBEF to promote the Indian pharmaceutical industry. It focuses on factors of affordability, quality, and accessibility, especially for generic medicines.

=== Brand India Plantations ===
Brand India Plantations is an IBEF initiative to promote the sale of Indian teas, coffees, and spices. Brand India Plantations (www.teacoffeespiceofindia.com) was set up to provide information on these products.

=== Brand India Engineering ===
Brand India Engineering was launched to promote Indian engineering products and services. IBEF made inroads into new subsegments like Auto Components and Medical Devices apart from the existing Pumps & Valves and Electrical Equipment & Products. A strong focus was laid on international and domestic events to promote awareness and improve the perception of Indian engineering products and services.

== IBEF Website ==
The website – (https://www.ibef.org) – is one of the most popular websites for information on the Indian economy and business. The website ranks among the most popular platforms providing updated and comprehensive information on Indian business and the economy.

IBEF website also hosts the India Adda Blog which, apart from sharing well-researched in-house content pieces, invites contributions from established corporates and start-ups. It is a knowledge centre for global investors, international policy-makers and world media seeking updated, accurate and comprehensive information on the Indian economy, states and sectors. The website regularly tracks government announcements in policy, foreign investment, macroeconomic indicators and business trends.

IBEF publishes event information on the website, hosts multimedia content and provides business information reports on the Indian states and sectors.
