= Cottonworld =

Indian clothing brand

Cottonworld, Lekhraj Corp. Pvt. Ltd.
- Industry: Fashion
- Founded: 1987
- Founder: Lekhraj Brothers
- Headquarters: Gala -F, Sidhwa Estate, Old BMP Building, Colaba, Mumbai, India
- Area served: Worldwide
- Key people: Lavin Lekhraj (Promoter)
- Products: Men's Western Wear; Women's Western Wear
- Brands: Cottonworld
- Website: cottonworld.net

Cottonworld is a clothing brand with 31 stores across India. Their head office is based in Mumbai. The brand's products are made from fabrics like cotton, linen, and viscose.
