= Skeleton Woman =

Play by Kalki Koechlin and Prashant Prakash

Skeleton Woman is a play written by Kalki Koechlin and Prashant Prakash. The play won The MetroPlus Playwright Award in 2009. The play is based on an Inuit folk tale and is a modern-day adaptation of the story. It focuses on a writer and his long-suffering wife.
