= Neil Bhoopalam =

Indian actor

- Born: 19 March 1983 (age 43); Mumbai, India
- Occupation: Actor
- Years active: 2002-present
- Spouse: Nandini Shrikent
- Children: 1

Neil Bhoopalam is an Indian actor who has worked in films, television and stage productions. He is known for his roles in films such as No One Killed Jessica, Shaitan, NH10, Lust Stories, Ungli and the Indian TV series 24.

== Career ==
Bhoopalam started his Bollywood career with the film Mera Dil Leke Dekho although he is primarily a stage actor. He has acted in several prominent plays such as Nadir Khan's A Few Good Men and Hamlet — The Clown Prince by Rajat Kapoor.

== Personal life ==
Bhoopalam is married to Nandini Shrikent, a casting director in Bollywood. They have a son named Fateh.

== Filmography ==
Key
†	Denotes films that have not yet been released

=== Films ===
Year	Title	Role	Notes
2009	Mere Khwabon Mein Jo Aaye	Ali	
2009	Fatso!	Yash	
2011	No One Killed Jessica	Vikram Jai Singh	
2011	Shaitan	Zubin Shroff	
2014	Ungli	Gautam "Goti"	
2015	NH10	Arjun	
2018	Kaalakaandi	Omlette/Ustad	
2018	Lust Stories	Ajit Khanna	Zoya Akhtar's segment
2019	Darkness Visible	AJ	
2020	Shakuntala Devi	Dheeraj Rajan	
2022	Cobalt Blue	Literature teacher	
2025	Chhaava	Muhammad Akbar (Mughal prince)	Hindi
2026	Everybody Loves Sohrab Handa	Raman Chawla	Hindi

=== Television ===
Year	Title	Role	Notes
2013–2016	24	Aditya Singhania	2 seasons
2015	Bang Baaja Baaraat	Sarang	
2018	Smoke	Savio	
2019	Thinkistaan		
2019–2022	Four More Shots Please!	Varun Khanna	3 seasons
2020	The Raiker Case	John Pereira	
2020–present	Masaba Masaba	Dhairya Rana	2 seasons
2023	Made in Heaven	Danish	2 episodes
