= Titan Company =

Indian multinational jeweller and watchmaker

Titan Company Limited
- Logo of Titan Company
- Type: Public
- Traded as: BSE: 500114; NSE: TITAN; BSE SENSEX constituent; NSE NIFTY 50 constituent
- ISIN: INE280A01028
- Industry: Lifestyle
- Founded: 1984; 42 years ago
- Founder: Xerxes Desai
- Headquarters: Bangalore, Karnataka, India
- Number of locations: 2,000+ retail stores
- Area served: Worldwide
- Key people: Sandhya Venugopal Sharma (Chairman ); Ajoy Chawla (MD); Ashok Sonthalia (CFO)
- Products: Watches, Jewellery, Bags, Perfumes, Belts, Wallets and Eyewear
- Revenue: ▲₹88,036 crore (US$9.4 billion) (FY2026)
- Operating income: ▲₹8,355 crore (US$890 million) (FY2026)
- Net income: ▲₹5,073 crore (US$540 million) (FY2026)
- Total assets: ▲₹60,561 crore (US$6.5 billion) (FY2026)
- Total equity: ▲₹15,703 crore (US$1.7 billion) (FY2026)
- Owners: TIDCO (27.88%); Tata Sons (25.02%)
- Number of employees: 8,680 (2024)
- Parent: Tata Group
- Subsidiaries: Titan Engineering and Automation Limited
- Website: titancompany.in
- Footnotes; Financials as of 25 May 2026.

Titan Company Limited is an Indian fashion accessories company that mainly manufactures items such as jewellery, watches and eyewear. Part of the Tata Group and started as a joint venture with TIDCO, the company has its corporate headquarters in Electronic City, Bangalore, and registered office in Hosur, Tamil Nadu.

Titan Company commenced operations in 1984 under the name Titan Watches Limited. In 1994, Titan diversified into jewellery with Tanishq and subsequently into eyewear with Titan Eyeplus. In 2005, it launched its youth fashion accessories brand Fastrack. Titan is the largest branded jewellery maker in India by value, with a 6% market share as of 2022. More than 80% of its total revenue comes from the jewellery segment. As of 2019, it is also the fifth-largest watch manufacturer in the world by volume.

== History ==
=== 1984–1990 ===
Titan Company Limited was inaugurated on 26 July 1984 under the name Titan Watches Limited in Chennai. A plant was set up to manufacture quartz analogue electronic watches in the State Industries Promotion Corporation of Tamil Nadu industrial area at Hosur. In November 1986, Titan Company and Casio signed an MoU to manufacture 2 million digital and analog-digital watches.

=== 1991–2010 ===
In 1992, Timex entered the Indian market by establishing a joint venture with Titan Watches. Under the agreement, Timex manufactured lower-priced watches, which were marketed and sold in Titan stores alongside Titan's higher-end watches.

In September 1993, Titan Watches changed its name to Titan Industries as it ventured into products other than watches. In 1994, Titan launched its jewellery brand Tanishq.

In 1997, Titan and Timex terminated their partnership. In a bid to compete with Timex, Titan soon after launched a range of economy watches under Sonata, and a watch and accessories sub-brand, Fastrack, which was targeted at younger customers.

In 2004, Titan signed an agreement with the Murjani Group to market and distribute the latter's Tommy Hilfiger watches in India. 2004, Titan partnered with LVMH to service the latter's watches in India through its service centres.

In 2005, Fastrack was positioned as an independent accessory brand targeting the urban youth. To become a fashion brand, Fastrack launched sunglasses in the same year and launched bags, belts and wallets in 2009. In 2007, Titan established its prescription eyewear store chain called Titan Eyeplus. Titan launched a multi-brand luxury watch store format called Helios in 2009.

=== 2011–present ===
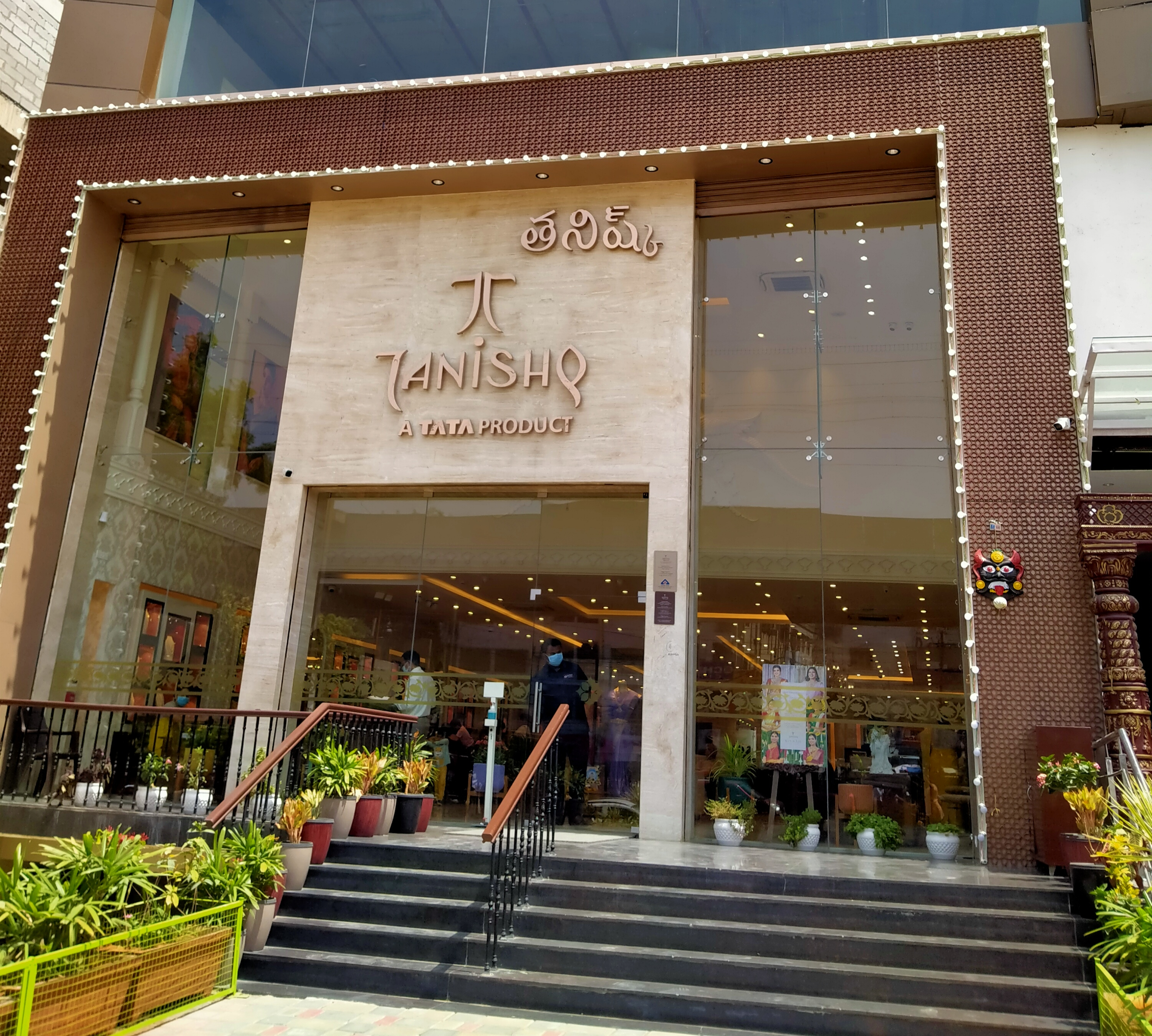
A Tanishq jewellery store in Hyderabad.

Titan acquired Swiss watchmaker Favre-Leuba in 2011 for €2 million to enter the European market. In 2013, Titan entered the fragrances segment with the brand Skinn and helmets category under the Fastrack brand. In the same year, it changed its name to Titan Company Ltd. In 2014, it entered into a joint venture with Montblanc to establish its retail stores in India.

In 2016, Titan entered the wearable devices market by introducing its smartwatch, Juxt, made through a collaboration with Hewlett-Packard. In 2017, the company launched a fitness tracker, named Gesture Band under its youth accessories brand, Fastrack. In 2018, the company added new fitness tracker bands. The company had a 7.4% market share in the wearable devices market as of 2018.

In 2017, Titan started its women's ethnic wear retail chain named Taneira. In 2018, Titan merged its South India-focused jewellery brand Gold Plus with Tanishq.

In November 2020, Titan opened its first overseas Tanishq store in Dubai.

In 2023, Titan sold its subsidiary Favre-Leuba to Ethos.

In 2025, the company forayed into the lab-grown diamonds category by launching beYon - from the House of Titan with an exclusive retail store in Mumbai as a part of ongoing strategy to cater to the adornment needs of women in lifestyle categories beyond watches, perfumes, sarees and handbags.

== Subsidiaries and affiliate companies ==
Titan Engineering & Automation Limited is a wholly owned subsidiary of Titan. It was formerly known as Titan-Precision Engineering Division. The company now deals in machine building, automation and component manufacturing.

Titan Company acquired the historic Swiss watch brand Favre-Leuba in November 2011 for US$2.7 million.

In 2015, Titan entered a joint venture to sell products of the Swiss luxury brand Montblanc through its retail outlets. Titan's equity share in Montblanc India Retail Private Limited is 49% and Montblanc Services B.V. holds 51%.

In 2016, Titan acquired a 62% stake in CaratLane for ₹357 crore (US$53.13 million). In 2023, Titan acquired another 27.18% stake in CaratLane from its founder and his family for ₹4,621 crore (US$559.45 million) in cash, following which its stake in the company increased to 98.28%. In 2024, Titan acquired the remaining stake in CaratLane.

In mid-2025, Titan Company Limited acquired 67% stake in the UAE-based Damas Jewellery and enables the company's expansion across the six GCC countries - UAE, Saudi Arabia, Qatar, Oman, Kuwait and Bahrain.

=== Brands ===
- Watches and Wearables
  - Titan
  - Titan Exacta
  - Titan Clocks
  - Zoop by Titan
  - Edge by Titan
  - Titan Octane
  - Xylys
  - Raga by Titan
  - Nebula by Titan
  - Fastrack
  - Fastrack smart
  - Sonata
  - Titan smart
  - SF Watch by Sonata
  - Helios
  - Titan World
- Jewellery
  - Tanishq
  - Zoya
  - Mia
  - CaratLane
  - beYon
- Eyewear
  - Titan Eyeplus
  - Fastrack Eyecare
- Indian Dress Wear
  - Taneira
- Fragrances and Fashion Accessories
  - Skinn
  - Titan Belts and Wallets
  - Fastrack Bags
  - IRTH

==== Fastrack ====
Fastrack

Fastrack is an Indian fashion accessory brand, launched in 1998 as a sub-brand of Titan Watches. In 2005, Fastrack was spun off as an independent brand targeting the urban youth and growing fashion industry in India. Fastrack began opening retail stores throughout the country. The first store was opened in early 2009.

Fastrack Entered the Affordable Smart Segment with the Launch of Reflex Beat+ in 2023 Fastrack now has presence across multiple categories, like eyewear, backpacks, watches and wearables.
