= Institute of Management Technology =

Institute of Management (and) Technology may refer to:

== Germany ==
- Stuttgart Institute of Management and Technology, Stuttgart, Germany

== India ==
- Institute of Management Technology, Ghaziabad, a business school in India
- Institute of Management Technology, Nagpur, a business school in India
- RIMT University, Mandi Gobindgarh, Punjab
- Indian Institute of Information Technology and Management, Gwalior
- Sagar Institute of Technology and Management, Uttar Pradesh, India
- Accurate Institute of Management and Technology, Greater Noida
- Institute of Technology and Management, Gwalior
- Gandhi Institute of Technology and Management, a private university in Andhra Pradesh
- Girijananda Chowdhury Institute of Management and Technology, Tezpur, Assam

== Nigeria ==
- Institute of Management and Technology, Enugu

== Pakistan ==
- University of Management and Technology (Lahore), formerly known as the Institute of Management and Technology

== Sri Lanka ==
- South Asian Institute of Technology and Management, a privately owned educational institution

== Ukraine ==
- Institute of Management Technologies, an institute of the National Aviation University, Ukraine
