= Kanishka (disambiguation) =

Kanishka (c. AD 127–163) was the emperor of the Kushan dynasty.

Kanishka, Kaniska or Kaniška may also refer to:

- Kanishka Casket, a Buddhist reliquary dated to the first year of the reign of Kanishka
- Kanishka Stupa, 2nd century CE stupa near Peshawar, Pakistan
- Air India Flight 182 or Kanishka, an Air India aircraft named after emperor Kanishka, bombed over the Atlantic Ocean in 1985
- Kaniška Iva, a village in Croatia
- Kaniska canace (blue admiral), a nymphalid butterfly
- Pseudochazara kanishka, a nymphalid butterfly
- Kanishka (name)
- Kanishk Seth (disambiguation)
  - Kanishk Seth (cricketer) (born 1997), an Indian cricketer
  - Kanishk Seth (musician), an Indian music composer
