= Kanishk Seth =

Kanishk Seth may refer to:

- Kanishk Seth (cricketer) (born 1997), Indian cricketer
- Kanishk Seth (musician), Indian music composer

== See also ==
- Kanishka (disambiguation)
- Seth (disambiguation)
