= Rajshree Ojha =

Indian film maker (born 1976)

- Born: Kolkata, India
- Occupation: Film director
- Years active: 2005–present

Rajshree Ojha (born 1976) is an Indian film maker who directed Aisha (2010) and Chaurahen (2007).

== Early life ==
Born in 1976, Rajshree is from Kolkata. She grew up in Bangalore and left to New York City for her graduation in computer science. After completing her graduation, she went to learn film-making from New York University. She had her masters in film-making from American Film Institute in 2002. Her short film named Badger, which was done as a part of her diploma, won American Film Institute's Spirit of Excellence Award for Outstanding Direction. She was also honored as Asian Voice by Directors Guild of America She returned to India in 2005.

== Film career ==
Rajshree's first film is Chaurahen which was based on four short stories of prominent Hindi novelist Nirmal Verma. The works of this movie started in early 2002. The film had an ensemble cast which includes Soha Ali Khan, Zeenat Aman, Kiera Chaplin, Nedumudi Venu etc. However the producer left the project in the final minute and Rajshree decided to produce the film by herself. The film went finally on floors in 2005 and was finally completed in 2007 in a budget of 1.80 crores. The project was shelved many times due to financial issues and it finally had a theatrical release in 2012 through Director's Rare, an initiative by PVR Pictures. Meanwhile, the movie was showcased in many film festivals and received critical appreciation.

Even though Chaurahen is the first film of Rajshree, Aisha is widely considered as her debut. Works for the movie started in 2009. The movie that had Sonam Kapoor and Abhay Deol in the lead and it was produced by Anil Kapoor. The movie was based on Jane Austen's Emma (novel) and screenplay was done by Devika Bhagat. The movie was released on 2010 and received mixed responses. Later Rajshree said that she had no control over the final cut and it was fully shaped by the producer Anil Kapoor. What was seen on screen was not even closer to her envisions.

Rajshree's next venture was the movie X: Past Is Present which was an anthology movie comprising 8 directors. She did the segment named Biriyani which had Radhika Apte and Rajat Kapoor in the lead. It was about a couple who split on their anniversary.

== Filmography ==
- Chaurahen (2007) (Director & Writer)
- Aisha (2010) (Director)
- X: Past Is Present (2015) (Director and Writer of the segment Biriyani)
- Bin Kuch Kahe (2017) (Writer, Producer)
- Potluck (Indian web series) (2021) (Director)
- Potluck Season 2 (2023) (Director)
