= Kanishka (name) =

Kanishka or Kaniska may refer to

- Kanishka (c. AD 127–163), emperor of the Kushan dynasty
- Kanishka II (c. AD 225–245), emperor of the Kushan dynasty
- Kanishka III (c. AD 268), emperor of the Kushan dynasty
- Kanishka Biswas, Indian chemist
- Kanishka Chaugai (born 1986), Nepalese cricketer
- Kaniska Kulasekera (born 1973), Sri Lankan cricketer
- Kanishka Pandey, Indian sports researcher
- Kanishka Raffel, Australian Anglican cleric
- Kanishka Singh (born 1978), Indian politician
- Kanishka Soni (born 1987), Indian actress and model
- Kanishka Raja (1970–2018), Indian-American artist
- Kanischka Taher (born 1991), Afghan footballer
