= Trivial Disasters =

Play by Ajay Krishnan

Trivial Disastors is a comic stage play written by playwright Ajay Krishnan. The play first staged in 2014 and was directed by Atul Kumar starring Kalki Koechlin, Richa Chaddha, Cyrus Sahukar and Purab Kohli. The play comprises eight short acts in which characters find themselves in absurd everyday situations and take even more absurd decisions. The play was well received by the critics and Charulata of Mumbai Theater Guide calling Koechlin "the best performer of the evening".
