= Rajeev Karwal =

Indian businessman (1963–2021)

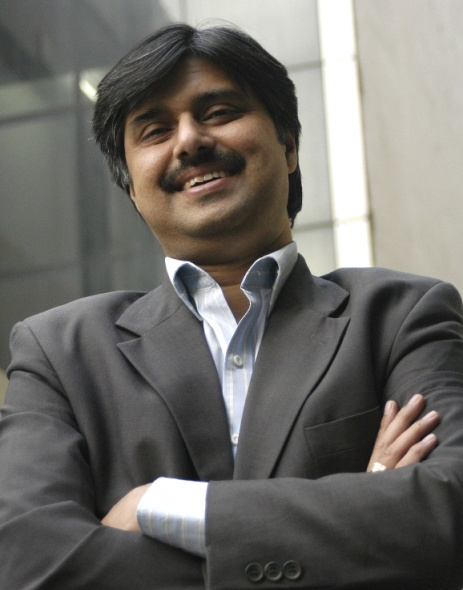
- Born: 11 April 1963
- Died: 12 May 2021 (aged 58)
- Education: Institute of Management Technology, Ghaziabad
- Occupations: Founder and CEO of Milagrow
- Spouse: Shobha Karwal
- Children: e
- Website: www.milagrowhumantech.com

Rajeev Karwal (11 April 1963 – 12 May 2021) was an Indian businessman.

He founded Milagrow robotic company on 2012.

== Biography ==
He was credited with bringing LG Corp to India in 1997. Karwal also served as the CEO of Electrolux Kelvinator and also of Reliance Retail. He is an alumnus of Institute of Management Technology, Ghaziabad in Uttar Pradesh, India.

Karwal began working at Onida Electronics as the Marketing Executive and became the Deputy General Manager. He went on to work with the Kishinchand Chellaram Group‚ in the Canary Islands‚ Spain. He joined Surya Roshini Limited and brought about an outstanding business turnaround in a very short time. At LG Corp India‚ as their Vice President Sales & Marketing‚ he transformed the company. From LG he moved in as Business Head of Consumer Electronics at Philips. He then moved on to become the Managing Director at Electrolux India. His turnaround in Electrolux resulted in the company posting a 49% growth in sales. After stepping down from the post of President & CEO of the Consumer Durables Vertical of Reliance Retail, he founded Milagrow Business and Knowledge Solutions.

Karwal founded Milagrow Business and Knowledge Solutions in 2007. It came into existence with the aim of offering support as a venture catalyst to fill the 'Management Capital' need gaps of growth-seeking - micro, small and medium businesses.

He died on 12 May 2021 after contracting COVID-19.

== Honours and recognition ==
- Economic Times India’s Most Powerful CEOs list 2004
- Recipient of the 1st Most Distinguished Alumnus Award of IMT Ghaziabad when it was instituted in 2005.
- Was featured on the cover of Business Today, in the 1st ever listing of Top 25 Young Rising Stars of India Inc.
