= Institute of Management Technology, Nagpur =

- Motto: Growing Intellectually : Lead the Future
- Type: Private Business School
- Established: 2004
- Affiliations: Institute of Management Technology, Ghaziabad, Institute of Management Technology, Dubai, Institute of Management Technology, Hyderabad,
- President: Bakul Nath
- Location: Nagpur, Maharashtra, India
- Campus: Fully residential, 27 acres
- Nickname: IMT-N
- Website: imtnagpur.ac.in

The Institute of Management Technology, Nagpur, also known as IMT Nagpur or simply IMTN, is a private business school located in Nagpur, Maharashtra, India. It was the second Institute of Management Technology (IMT) to be established, after IMT Ghaziabad.

IMT's educational programmes have been recognized by All India Council for Technical Education (AICTE) and Ministry of Human Resource Development, Government of India IMT Nagpur is also accredited by National Board of Accreditation (NBA) for 5 years.

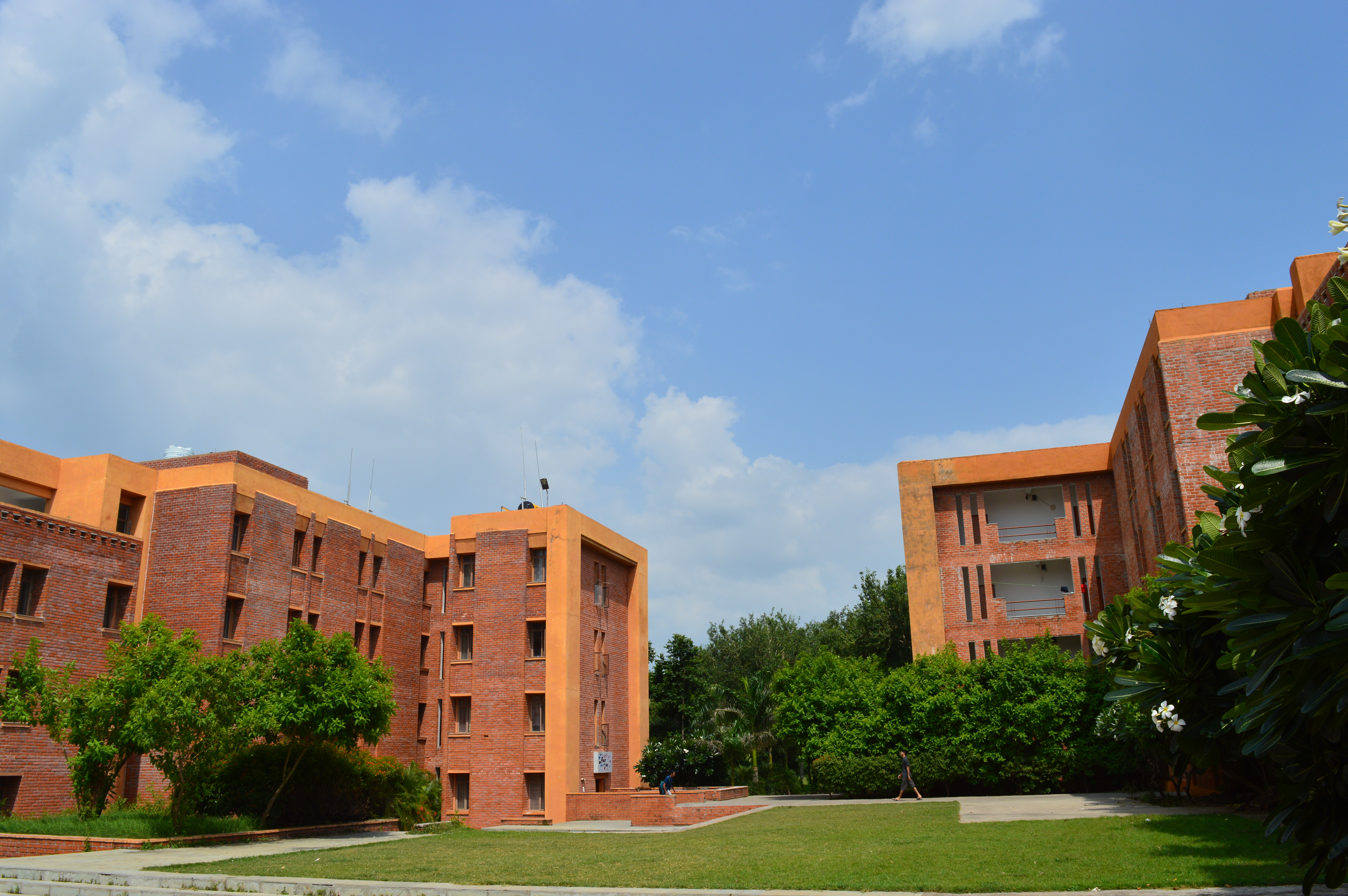
The scenic view of the sprawling hostel buildings of IMT-N
