= Potluck (TV series) =

2021 Indian comedy-drama web television series

- Genre: Sitcom
- Written by: Gaurav Lulla; Bharat Misra; Ashwin Lakshmi Narayan
- Directed by: Rajshree Ojha
- Starring: see below
- Country of origin: India
- Original language: Hindi
- No. of seasons: 2
- No. of episodes: 16

Production
- Executive producer: Rohan Barhate
- Producers: Gaurav Lulla; Vivek Gupta; Pavneet Gakhal; Kunal Dasgupta
- Cinematography: Dhirendra Shukla; Athit Naik
- Editor: Pranav Mistry
- Running time: 25 minutes

Original release
- Network: SonyLIV
- Release: 10 September 2021 – present

Potluck is a 2021 Indian comedy-drama web television series that premiered on SonyLIV on 10 September 2021. It is directed by Rajshree Ojha and the series has an ensemble cast including Kitu Gidwani, Jatin Sial, Cyrus Sahukar, Ira Dubey, Harman Singha, Salonie Patel, Shikha Talsania and Siddhant Karnick.

The dated teaser of the second season was released on 10 February 2023. The second season was premiered on Sony LIV on 24 February 2023.

== Synopsis ==
Potluck is a heartwarming and amusing depiction of the Shastri family trying to build a strong, lasting bond with each other. As the name suggests, each character brings a unique flavour in this Potluck of emotions through their varied opinions, views and life situations.

While the first season introduces us to the Shastris and how their regular potlucks originated, the second season dives deeper into the lives of the Shastri clan and explores some new-age conundrums that are faced by all modern families.

=== Season 1 ===
The first season of Potluck introduces Govind and Pramila Shastri and their kids, Vikrant, Dhruv and Prerna. While Vikrant and Dhruv are married to Akansha and Nidhi, respectively, Prerna meets Aalim on a blind date.

We first meet the Shastris at Dhruv and Nidhi Shastri’s brand new home, where his brother Vikrant realises he too needs to purchase a bigger place. But his thoughts are not supported by his wife Akansha and also create a rift between Dhruv and Nidhi. While Pramila hears what her kids think about her, Prerna meets Aalim on a blind date. It is then revealed how Govind persuaded his family for the potluck, a truth which Dhruv stumbled upon. Nidhi tries to hold a potluck alone and Vikrant-Akansha spend some quality time together. Tensions arise when Aalim meets the Shastris and Govind’s lies are spilled out by Dhruv, leading to an intense confrontation. The family gets back together after an unfortunate accident, leading to a sweet reunion.

==== Episodic Synopsis ====
Episode 1 - Meet the Shastris as they attempt to organise a potluck at Dhruv and Nidhi's opulent new home. Vikrant starts to understand that his family needs a larger home, and Govind gets a shock when he surprises Dhruv with a TV as a welcome present.

Episode 2 - The next Potluck is hosted by Vikrant and Akansha Shastri. Tension arises as a result of Vikrant's hunt for a new residence not just with Akansha but also between Nidhi and Dhruv. Playing matchmakers for Prerna, Govind and Pramila get surprising outcomes.

Episode 3 - At Govind and Pramila's anniversary costume party, the Shastris exhibit both their best and worst sides. Hearing what her kids think of her hurts Pramila. While Vikrant and Dhruv attempt to "control" their better halves, Prerna and Aalim investigate their recent connection.

Episode 4 - The Shastri siblings recall the precise circumstances surrounding the origin of this "Potluck." With the help of a long-lost buddy, Govind tells how he persuaded the family to attend the potluck.

Episode 5 - Nidhi tries to host the Potluck by herself, but things don't go as planned. While on a business trip, Dhruv meets some surprising people by chance, and Akansha and Vikrant attempt to rekindle their romance.

Episode 6 - Prerna arranges a meet-the-folks with Aalim at the weekly potluck. However, Pramila and Govind respond in divergent ways, while Nidhi continues to be angry with Dhruv over his major deception. But, Dhruv is not the only one who lies...or who gets caught.

Episode 7 - As Vikrant and Akansha experience nostalgia as they prepare to move into their new home. A web of lies has ensnared Dhruv and is now impairing his wellbeing. The unappealing food at the Potluck is the least of Govind's problems as he takes on the day's cooking duties.

Episode 8 - When Shastris are astonished to learn the reality. It takes an accident for the entire family to come together and confront one another.

=== Season 2 ===
The second season of Potluck delves deeper into the Shastri family's lives and examines some contemporary dilemmas that affect many families today.

Nothing seems to be the same as it was before, whether it’s Pramila striving to rediscover herself at the age of 60 or Vikrant taking on the role of a household manager. On one hand, Nidhi is perplexed by the predictability of her existence, while Akansha struggles to balance work and home. When Dhruv loses his job, he finds himself on uncharted grounds, and Prerna has trouble moving her and Aalim’s relationship forward. Yet as is customary for this family, they come together and ensure that "It's all okay."

==== Episodic Synopsis ====
Episode 1 - A brand-new aspect of the Shastri Savannah is explored. As the Shastris encounter a few twists in life, Pramila has a surprise in store for everyone.

Episode 2 - The Shastri men decide to unite to cheer up Dhruv while the Shastri women organise a girls' day out. Govind is thrilled to support Pramila's decision, but she doesn't seem to be overly thrilled about it. Dhruv finally shares an unexpected news with his father, Govind, who to his surprise, handles it well.

Episode 3 - Every Shastri is on board to support one another. Prerna's surprise for Aalim gets help from Nidhi. Govind assists Dhruv in adjusting to his job loss, and Aalim recruits Jacob to assist Pramila. Using Vikrant's tips, Akansha makes an effort to make new friends at work.

Episode 4 - As Jacob starts training Pramila, Govind seems unable to handle this external help. Prerna and Aalim have a disagreement, setting off a confrontation. Thanks to Dhruv, Vikrant's Super Dad avatar vanishes too soon. Nidhi learns that a visitor she wasn't anticipating is going to be arriving in the meanwhile.

Episode 5 - Pramila's newfound enthusiasm divides the Shastris, and chaos ensues. Dhruv realises what his true calling is while Nidhi is finding it difficult to accept her mother's new appearance. Akansha believes she is being stereotyped at work and is unhappy about it.

Episode 6 - The family gathers for a potluck unlike any other to celebrate Govind and Pramila's anniversary. Nidhi learns to accept her mother's viewpoint. Prerna attempts to make amends after realising her mistake with Aalim.

Episode 7 - To spend some time alone, Vikrant and Akansha decide to skip their parental responsibilities for one day. Govind assists Dhruv in developing his new business plan, but things don't turn out as expected. By the end of the day, Nidhi decides to take up a new hobby and enlists Prerna's help.

Episode 8 - The Shastri family is taken over by the spectacular grand event's conclusion. But as usual, nothing goes as expected when the Shastris are involved. Despite difficulties, Pramila succeeds with her loved ones by her side. Aalim, however, is the one who wins the prize of a lifetime.

== Cast ==
- Jatin Sial as Govind Shastri
- Kitu Gidwani as Pramila Shastri
- Cyrus Sahukar as Vikrant Shastri
- Ira Dubey as Akanksha Shastri
- Harman Singha as Dhruv Shastri
- Saloni Patel as Nidhi Shastri
- Shikha Talsania as Prerna Shastri
- Siddhant Karnick as Aalim
- Varun Sood as Jacob

== Release ==
Potluck was premiered on SonyLIV globally on 10 September 2021. The first trailer was released on 12 August 2021.

The season 2 was released on 24 February 2023.

== Reception ==
The second season of Potluck opened with fairly positive reviews.

Dhaval Roy from Entertainment Times gave the series 3 out of 5 stars and remarked, ‘With no intense or dark drama and heavily character-driven plots, 'Potluck Season 2' is as binge-worthy as its predecessor.’

KoiMoi's Shubham Kulkarni gave the second season 3 out of 5 stars, citing, ‘Potluck season 2 does progress in its own best way but there are problems one cannot ignore. It is a harmless watch that can make your day a bit joyous.’

Moumita Bhattacharjee of Latest LY said, ‘Potluck season 2, it seems, was put together to let everyone know how the Shastris are doing after the events of the last season. It doesn't have any reasonable conflict. But even with its flaws, it does leave a smile on your face.’

Vinamra Mathur of Firstpost called the series refreshing, stating, ‘this show is far removed from the gratuitous gore and expletives that have become the driving force of most series out there.

Gadgets 360° gave the series 4.1 stars while Jagran gave it a rating of 3 stars.

OTTPlay’s Shaheen Irani gave the series 3.5 out of 5 stars and said, ‘This cute family drama will make you laugh, smile and give you hope that there’s more to life even in the saddest moments.

With 3 out of 5 stars, Kunal Kothari of India Forums stated that the situations in the series are ‘genuinely funny, the humor is crisp and sophisticated and even in the more slapstick situations, it lands.’

Binged called the series ‘A warm hug on a cold winter day’ while giving it 5.5 stars out of 10.
