= Rudratej Singh =

Indian business executive (1973–2020)

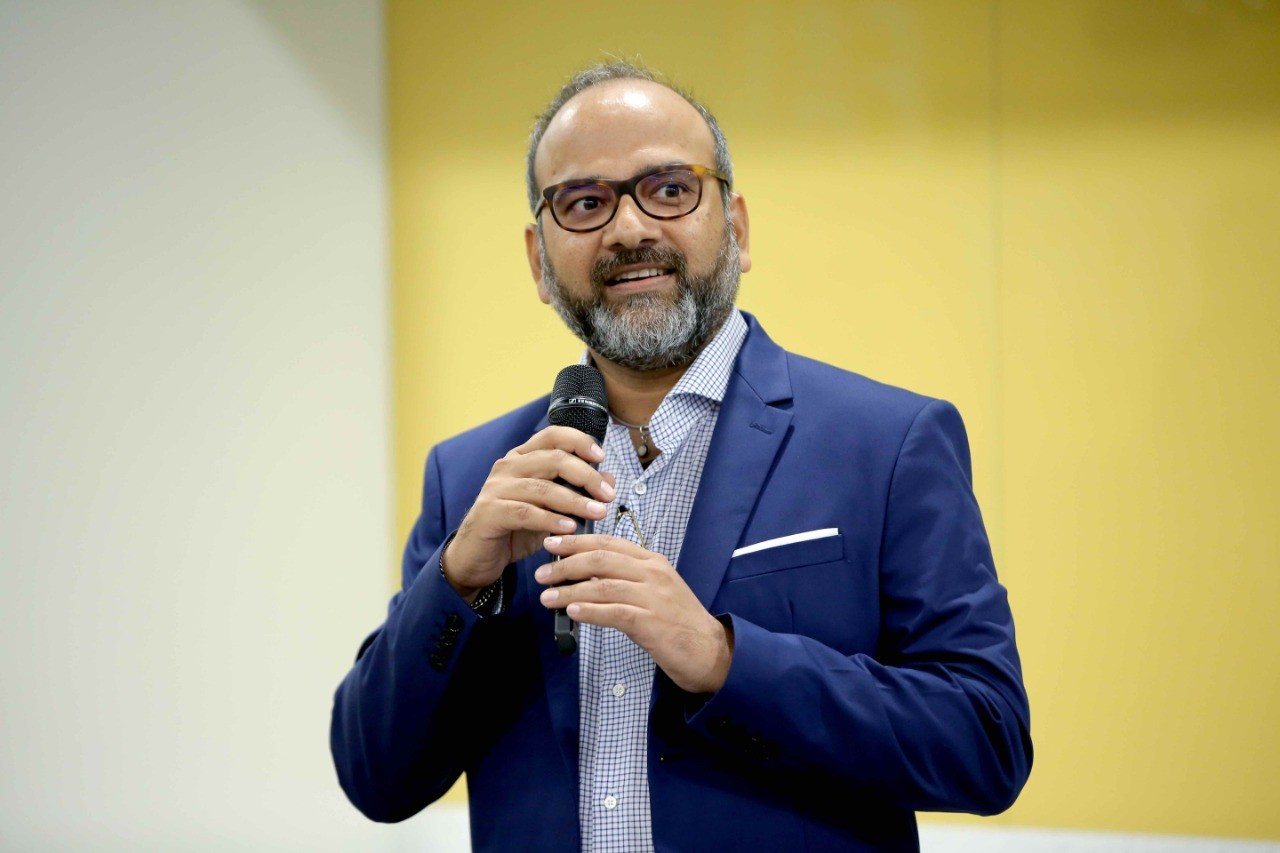
- Born: 1973
- Died: 20 April 2020 (aged 46)
- Education: Air Force Bal Bharati School; Delhi University; IMT Ghaziabad
- Occupations: CEO, president
- Employer: BMW India
- Known for: Career in Royal Enfield Motors and Unilever

Rudratej Singh (1973 – 20 April 2020) was an Indian business executive. He was the president and CEO of BMW India. Singh was also global president of Royal Enfield Motors Limited and vice president of Unilever in Singapore.

== Early life and education ==
Singh grew up in New Delhi. He completed his schooling at Air Force Bal Bharati School, batch of 1990. He graduated in commerce from Delhi University in 1993, and then moved on to the IMT Ghaziabad for an MBA in marketing and finance. In 2014, he undertook the Advanced Management Program at the Harvard Business School.

== Career ==
Singh started his career in 1996 as a senior product manager at Dabur India Limited. He then joined as an area sales manager with Hindustan Unilever in August 1998. In 2000, he was then promoted to senior brand manager, where he was one of the key people to create the Brooke Bond master brand. He then held senior positions at Hindustan Unilever Ltd and Unilever PLC across various developed and developing markets globally.

In January 2015, Singh moved from Unilever and joined Eicher Motors Limited (EML) as the president of their flagship motorcycle business, Royal Enfield, and member of the management team of Eicher Motors. In 2017, Singh was promoted to global president of Royal Enfield. During his four-year tenure, he helped Royal Enfield become one of the most profitable auto companies in the world. His efforts helped increase the company's market share in India from 3.3%, in 2014, to 6.9%, in 2018.

In 2019, Singh quit Royal Enfield after working for four years, and joined BMW India as its president and chief executive officer starting from August 2019.

== Death ==
Singh died on 20 April 2020 at the age of 46 of cardiac arrest.

== Other activities ==
Singh represented India as an amateur golfer and won 18 titles globally. He was also a board member of the Women's Golf Association of India (WGAI), and helped run a charity for underprivileged girls. He spoke frequently at various business and brand forums across the world.

== Awards and honors ==
- 2012 – Marketer of the Year by the World CMO Council – Asia
- 2007 – Hindustan Unilever Directors Award
