= Sab Khelo Sab Jeeto =

Indian Hindi-language game show

Sab Khelo Sab Jeeto is an Indian Hindi-language game show that aired on SAB TV from 12 October 2013 to 13 July 2014. The show was hosted by Cyrus Sahukar and produced by Neela Telefilms.

== Format ==
The show featured families competing in a series of physical and mental challenges. Each episode included multiple rounds of games where teams earned prizes based on their performance. Families typically consisted of four members, including at least one child. The format emphasized teamwork, coordination, and entertainment-oriented tasks.

== Production ==
The series was created by Asit Kumarr Modi and directed by TV Vinod. It was produced by Neela Asit Modi and Asit Kumarr Modi under Neela Telefilms. The show was filmed using a multi-camera setup and aired weekly on SAB TV.

== Host ==
The show was hosted by VJ and television presenter Cyrus Sahukar who guided contestants through various games and challenges.
