= Chaurahen =

- Directed by: Rajshree Ojha
- Written by: Nirmal Verma; Rajshree Ojha; Anuvab Pal
- Produced by: Pramod Ojha
- Starring: Zeenat Aman; Victor Banerjee; Roopa Ganguly; Soha Ali Khan; Shayan Munshi; Kiera Chaplin
- Cinematography: Tobias Datum
- Edited by: Beena Paul
- Music by: Manikanth Kadri
- Distributed by: PVR Pictures
- Release dates: 6 October 2007 (South Asian International Film Festival); 16 March 2012
- Running time: 84 minutes
- Country: India
- Language: English
- Budget: ₹18 million (US$190,000)

Chaurahen is an Indian drama film directed by Rajshree Ojha, starring Zeenat Aman, Roopa Ganguly, Soha Ali Khan and Kiera Chaplin in the leading roles. The film was based on four short stories of eminent Hindi novelist Nirmal Verma. Shooting was completed in 2007 but the film was shelved due to financial problems. The film was finally released on 16 March 2012 through PVR Pictures.

== Synopsis ==
Chaurahen consists of four different stories - a couple with a troubled and adulterous affair; a couple dealing with the loss of their son and a young man dealing with memories of his ancestral home - that is told against the backdrop of three different Indian cities. It hovers around the simple moments of everyday life. The overall theme of the movie is the importance of forgiveness and love.

== Cast ==
- Zeenat Aman
- Victor Banerjee as Dr. Bose
- Kiera Chaplin as Lea
- Roopa Ganguly as Mrs. Bose
- Soha Ali Khan as Ira
- Karthik Kumar as Nandu
- Shayan Munshi as Keshi Nair
- Arundathi Nag as Nandakumar Nair
- Nedumudi Venu as Mr. Nair
- Ankur Khanna as Farooq

== Production ==
The initial discussions of the Chaurahen happened in 2002 when director Rajshree Ojha met Nirmal Verma during the screening of her diploma short film. Nirmal gave permission to Rajshree to adapt his four short stories and Rajshree made a screenplay based on that. British actress Kiera Chaplin was roped in for playing a major character along with Victor Banerjee. However the producer of the film left at the last moment and the movie was shelved for a time. Rajshree decided to produce the movie by herself and the film went to floors in May 2005. The first schedule happened in Kolkata. The movie was again shelved due to lack of investors and the second schedule happened only one year later. The second schedule was most short in Kerala with Soha Ali Khan, Ankur Khanna, Karthik Kumar, Suchitra Pillai and Arundhati Nag.The third schedule was completed in Mumbai over a span of 13 days. The film was completed in 2007 in a budget of 18 million

== Release ==
The film was sent to many film festivals across the globe. Due to a lack of distributors the film did not get a theatrical release. The film was released on 16 March 2012 through PVR Pictures as a part of their Director's Rare initiative.

== Reception ==
Chaurahen opened to mixed reviews. Shunhash K. Jha of NDTV gave it a 4 star rating out of 5, ″This is a film so rich in unstated relevances that you wonder why dialogues for cinema were ever invented. Or why cinema for that matter, was invented if not to take us into places of the heart that are barred in Bollywood.″

Conversely, DNA India gave the film 2 stars out of 5, writing ″For a 90-minute feature, the pace of Chaurahen is slow enough to induce sleep. Too many unexplained angles and cheesy lines easily throws it into the one-time watch basket. It does not entertain even by a long shot, but sure does depress because of its intense portrayal of death and grief. Ojha handles her subject well, never resorting to melodrama or extreme reactions. The audience for such kind of cinema is so niche, it won’t be surprising if Chaurahen sinks without a trace.″ The Times of India found the movie to be average and said, "Chaurahen leaves you at the middle-of-the-road. You don't hate the film. But you don't love it either".
