= Naaz Joshi =

India's first international trans beauty queen

- Born: 31 December 1984 (age 41); New Delhi, India
- Relatives: Viveka Babajee (cousin)
- Modeling information
- Height: 5 ft 10 in (178 cm)
- Hair color: Brown
- Eye color: Green
- Agency: MIHM

Naaz Joshi (born 31 December 1984 in New Delhi, India) is India's first transgender international beauty queen, a trans rights activist and a motivational speaker.

Joshi won the Miss World Diversity beauty pageant three times in a row. She is India's first transgender cover model. She is the world's first trans woman to win an international beauty pageant with cisgender women.

== Biography ==
Joshi was born to a Muslim mother and a Hindu Punjabi father. At the age of 7, her family sent her to a distant relative in Mumbai to avoid taunts for her feminine behavior. She worked at dance bars and restaurants to earn a living from 1998 to 2006.

Joshi enrolled at the National Institute of Fashion Technology (NIFT) and completed her formal studies in fashion design. She completed her MBA in marketing from the Institute of Management Technology, Ghaziabad.

At the age of 18, Joshi met her cousin, Viveka Babajee, a Mauritian model. Viveka helped Joshi enter NIFT and she studied Fashion Design. After Viveka committed suicide in 2010, Joshi decided to fulfill her dream of becoming a model and stopped design.

Joshi worked as a sex worker to earn money for her sex reassignment surgery.

== Professional life ==
After her graduation, she worked with two designers of India, Ritu Kumar and Ritu Beri. She worked with an ex-Member of Parliament, Dr. Udit Raj, for gender sensitization and to make women aware of their constitutional rights and menstrual hygiene. Joshi has worked with Nitin Shakya, the Nodal officer of New Delhi District, to help the trans community. She is working on his project to mainstream the transgender community of India.

Joshi is a pageant director for Mrs. India Home Makers (MIHM). Its goal is to bridge the gender gap.

Joshi works on gender sensitisation programs. She has interacted with the trans community in schools and universities. She is currently the president of an international beauty pageant for trans women named Miss Universe Trans

== Pageantry ==
Joshi won the title of Miss World Diversity in 2017, 2018 and 2019, She became the first trans woman to win the title for three consecutive years. The win also made her the first transgender person in the world to win an international crown against cisgender women. In 2020 and 2022 she won miss universe diversity competition, The 2020 competition was made digital due to the COVID-19 pandemic. There were contestants from thirty countries who were given tasks. Joshi chose to work on women's safety and self-defense.

In September 2018, Joshi won the Miss Transqueen India in Mumbai.

In 2019, Joshi won the Miss Republic International Beauty Ambassador and Miss United Nations Ambassador pageants. On winning this particular title, she told Indulge Express that winning the crown gives her more power and responsibility towards society, with which she aims to work towards bringing the transgender community into the mainstream.

In 2021, Joshi won the Empress Earth pageant, making her India's first trans queen with seven titles. She is the first Indian to win the title. The contest was supposed to take place in Dubai on 1 June 2021, but due to the pandemic, the pageant was done virtually. Female Contestants from more than 15 countries participated in Empress Earth 2021. The countries that entered the top five were Colombia, Spain, Brazil, Mexico and India.

== Views ==
In an interview during the 72nd Independence Day celebration in India, she said that love is not free in the country. She said her marriage was called off because she is a trans woman.

In an interview with The Times of India, Joshi narrated her hurdles in pageantry. Some contestants backed out, hearing that a trans woman would be competing and some backed out because she had a history of sex work. She went on to say that in the national Indian trans pageant, where she competed in 2018, she was age shamed by her co-contestants because she was the eldest of all the transgender contestants.

In 2018, she claimed to be a victim of gender discrimination after having her booking rejected by a hotel in Gurgaon. A junior employee of the hotel, contacted about this by the Hindustan Times, stated that the booking was cancelled for "gender-based reasons", and was later denied by the general manager who stated the "allegations of discrimination of any kind were false" and that the hotel had not yet confirmed Joshi's booking because it was still waiting for approval from the regional sales office.

== Personal life ==
Joshi is a mother of two daughters.
