= Cyrus Sahukar =

Indian video jockey and actor

Cyrus Behram Sahukar
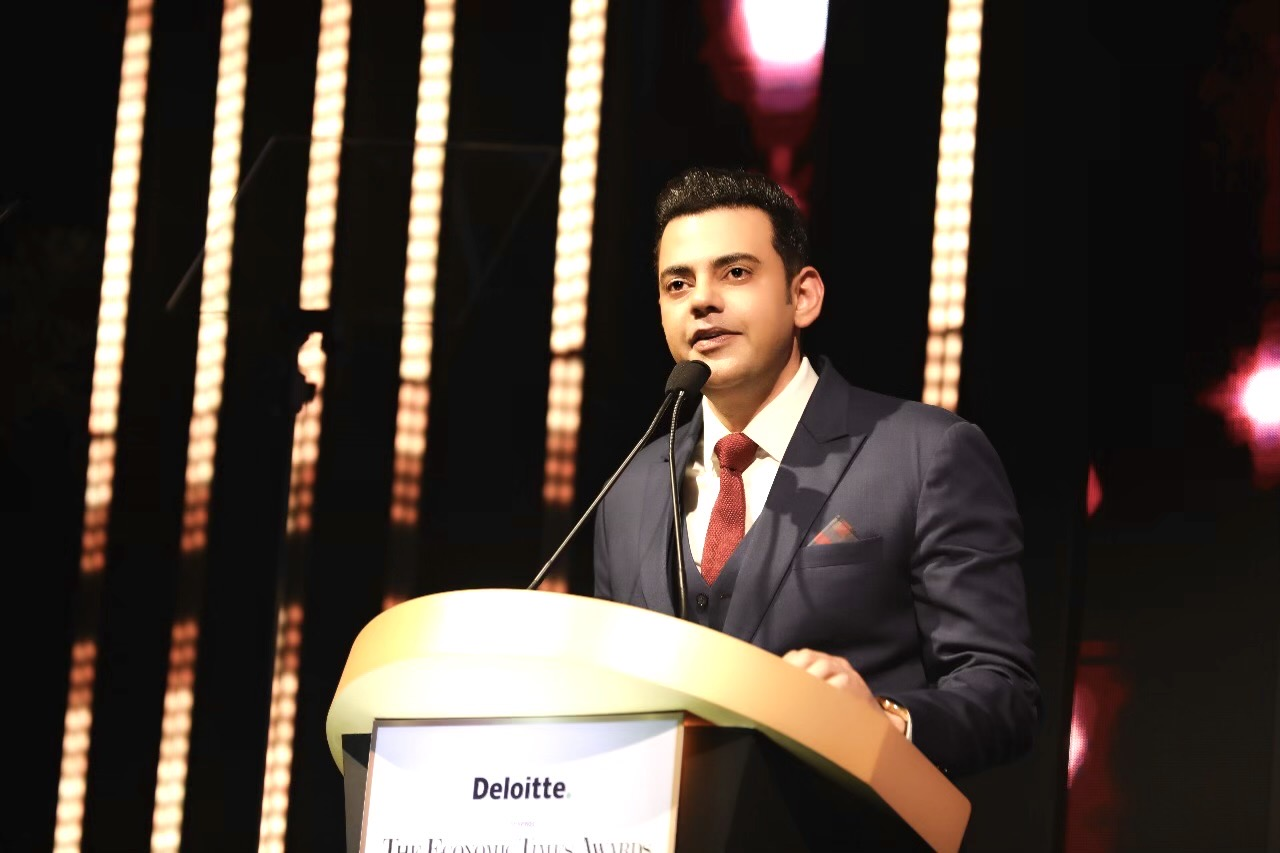
- Cyrus at the Deloitte's Economic Times awards 2022
- Born: 6 August 1980 (age 46); Mhow, Madhya Pradesh India
- Education: St. Columba’s, New Delhi; Delhi College of Arts and Commerce
- Occupations: Actor; VJ; writer
- Years active: 1999–present
- Spouse: Vaishali Malahara (m. 2022)

Cyrus Sahukar (born 6 August 1980) is an Indian actor, VJ, writer, host, comedian and an entrepreneur. He has acted in several OTT and Bollywood films.

== Early life and education ==
Cyrus Sahukar was born in the military headquarters of Mhow, Indore on 6 August 1980, to Colonel Behram Sahukar and writer Nimeran Sahukar. His father is a Parsi while his mother is of Punjabi origin. His paternal grandfather was a brigadier, Adi Sahukar, who served in the army alongside Sam Manekshaw. His parents separated at the age of 4 and he went on to live with his grandmother in Delhi.

Cyrus has an elder sister, Preeti Philip, who is an artist. He spent his childhood in Delhi where he did his schooling from St Columba's School, Delhi and he graduated from the Delhi College of Arts and Commerce of Delhi University. By the age of 14, he dabbled in music and was a lead singer of his band in School. After he turned 18, he won the MTV Vj hunt along with Mini Mathur and Asif Seth and moved to Mumbai.

== Career ==
=== Early years ===
Cyrus Sahukar started performing in theater and acted in school plays from the age of 6. By the age of 14, he was a part of IPS Kiran Bedi's Literacy Mission Program, in which the students performed plays and skits for the inmates of Tihar Jail. During the same period, he acted in a play- Haroun and the sea of stories by Salman Rushdie that was a part of Barry John's Red Noses Club. At 15, he performed a musical show called Thank you for the music, directed by Stephen Marazzi, which was his first professional endeavour as a singer. He later started assisting Roshan Abbas.

At 16, Sahukar began his career in Delhi, hosting a radio show called Radio Rampage. In the same year, he worked on the production and acted in Andrew Lloyd Webber's Starlight Express and Roshan Abbas's Graffiti Postcards from School. Sahukar also started doing radio voice-overs and jingles under his direction. His first jingle was for the brand Harpic.

=== Years as a VJ on MTV (2000–2010) ===
Cyrus’ MTV journey began with winning MTV VJ Hunt alongside Mini Mathur and Asif Seth. He also hosted MTV Chill Out in 1999. In 2000, he was the face of a show titled MTV Fully Faltoo. He also portrayed an assortment of bizarre personas in multiple other shows including Piddhu The Great, based on the Indian cricketer-commentator Navjot Singh Sidhu, and two seasons of Rendezvous with Semi Girebaal, which was his unusual take on the chat show Rendezvous with Simi Garewal. Semi Girebaal, the parody, had higher TRP than the original show. Cyrus also hosted MTV Roadies season 1 in 2003.

In 2004, Sahukar collaborated with his fellow VJ and funnyman Cyrus Broacha in a show called MTV123 which later became Cy vs Cy. Cyrus Sahukar, Ayushmann Khurrana, and an ex-roadie contestant Shambhavi Sharma starred in MTV's Fully Faltoo Film Festival.

Sahukar played the part of Pareshaan Awasthi in Bechaare Zameen Par, an hour-long feature that was a parody of the Indian film Taare Zameen Par (2007). Sahukar then went on to play 25 characters ranging from engineer Bobby Chadda to Paromita an NGO worker, Mr. Banerjee, Cyrus Macchiwala, Rapper AJ, in the mockumentary series Kick-Ass Morning (2009) among various other shows.

=== TV career ===
By 2008, he branched out from MTV to work with channels like POGO, Star TV, UTV, and Zee TV as a host on various game shows. He hosted the entrepreneurial reality show called Business Baazigar (2006) on ZeeTV. He also hosted 300 episodes of POGO channel's game show, Hole in the wall (2008) and POGO All-stars. He worked with Bloomberg UTV India as an anchor of the business news channel's business reality show called The Assignment Season 1 (2008). He also hosted The Pogo Amazing Kids awards in 2008.

Sahukar went on to host HDFC SpellBee (2009) on the National Geographic channel. In the same year, he hosted the world's largest wildlife quiz challenge Wild Wisdom Quiz (2009 and 2019). He also hosted another quiz show on Nat Geo, the national Olympiad, Teenovators Season 1 (2012) developed in association with Manipal University.

In 2012, he co-hosted India's Got Talent on Colors season 4 (2012) alongside Manish Paul. In the following year, Cyrus hosted about 90 episodes of Sab Khelo Sab Jeeto on Sony SAB (2013). He was also the host of the online show The Bench (2013).

Sahukar was seen playing puppeteer and host on the television comedy show, Challenge Accepted (2016), which premiered on Comedy Central. He was seen on several travel shows across International channels like Fox Life and Discovery. He also hosted Season 2 of the travel show Great Escape with Kunal and Cyrus on FOX LIFE with actor Kunal Kapoor in 2017.

Sahukar was seen back on MTV co-hosting Elovator Pitch (2018), a speed-dating show set in an elevator produced by BBC Studios with Gaelyn Mendonca. He co-hosted The Antisocial Network (2019) with fellow prankster and MTV VJ Jose Covaco in the proceeding year. Sahukar also appeared as a judge on the MTV competitive modeling show, Forbidden Angels (2021) alongside model and actress Mugdha Godse.

In 2020, he hosted his talk show Atrangi Fireside Chat with Cyrus, on the OTT screening platform, Zee5. In 2020, Sahukar explored his culinary passions in a new cooking show, titled The Missing Apron, on TLC India. He co-hosted the Discovery Plus show Feelin Alive seasons 1 and 2 (2021–2022) with actor, Amol Parashar. He also hosted Season 2 of the travel show The Great Escape on FOX LIFE with actor Kunal Kapoor in 2017. He also hosted the Cadbury 5 Star One Tip One Hand show on DisneyPlus Hotstar.

For the past 5 years, Cyrus has been hosting the BYJU's School Super league among other shows.

=== Films and OTT ===
In the early 2000s, Sahukar dabbed into acting in Bollywood movies. His first feature film was the Anupam Kher directorial, Om Jai Jagdish (2002). Later in 2006, Sahukar bagged the role of Rahul in the film Rang de Basanti (2006), an Indian drama film written, produced, and directed by Rakeysh Omprakash Mehra. He featured in a Rakeysh Omprakash Mehra directorial again in 2009 in Delhi 6. In the following year, he played the role of Randhir Gambir, a wealthy West Delhi boy, in the Sonam Kapoor & Abhay Deol starrer Aisha (2010). A year later, Sahukar starred in The House Guest (2011). In the same year, he starred in the Sahil Sangha directorate Love Breakups Zindagi (2011), a multistarrer romantic Hindi movie.

In 2014, Sahukar had a cameo in Sonam Kapoor's comedy drama film Khubsoorat where he played the role of Nausher Bandookwala. He also performed in an International film which was the first of four installments in the Heartbeat of the World anthology film series, Words with God directed by Mira Nair in 2014. Cyrus also played a role in Screenpanti's first original series- Office vs Office. Following this, he starred opposite Mini Mathur in the Amazon prime series Mind the Malhotras (2019) which went on to have a second season (2022).

In 2019, Sahukar was also seen in his first OTT movie Kadakh (2019) that premiered on Sony Liv. He also co-wrote Kadakh. In the following year, Sahukar was seen in a cameo performance in Maska (2020) on Netflix. He continued his collaboration with Sony Liv as he starred in the comedy drama series, Potluck season 1 and 2 (2020–2021).

In 2020, Sahukar acted in a show for Emmay Entertainment called Kaun Banegi Shekharvati alongside Lara Dutta, Naseeruddin Shah & Soha Ali Khan which was directed by Gaurav Chawla. Sahukar also hosted season 2 of The Lost Essence of India which captures the imagination and creates awareness about unexplored locations of India like the rugged valleys and mountains.

=== Live events ===
Cyrus has hosted over 3000 live events. His first awards show was as a VJ for MTV India's event, Lycra MTV style awards (2007). Sahukar has been invited to host the launch of various luxury brands in India which include Adidas, Ericsson, Samsung, Puma, and others. He began his collaboration with Tata Motors in 2015. He was also the host of the Huawei P9 launch event (2016). His next hosting for Tata Motors was alongside the world-renowned footballer, Lionel Messi, for the launch of Tata Tiago. He was also a part of Tata Motors’ Auto Expo (2016 and 2018), the largest automotive show in Asia. He also ran the TIGI Presents Femina Salon & Spa Hair Heroes (2016) awards as a host. He also played master of ceremonies as the host of the Economic Times Brand Equity and Business Leaders awards for 4 years.

In 2019, Sahukar hosted the prestigious Teacher's Golden Thistle Awards that was created through partnership with Republic TV. He is also the official host for BBC Top Gear Awards, Good Housekeeping Magazine Awards, Vogue Women of the Year Awards.

Sahukar hosted the GQ Men of the year Awards, Lonely Planet Awards and Hindustan Times Style Awards two years in a row in 2019. He also hosted The SHRM India HR Excellence Awards (2019 and 2020) that was part of Asia's largest conference, SHRM India's Annual Conference and Expo, aired on CNBC and CNN. Sahukar had a two-year contract with Google and YouTube to host some of their biggest events in India like Wizcraft AO presents Google Holiday Party (2020) and Google's Virtual Corporate Event (2020).

In concept events Sahukar has worked extensively with Diageo including being the official host for three years for the series Signature Masterclass. He hosted the segment Passion to Paycheck by Signature Masterclass featuring famous guests like Shah Rukh Khan, Kangana Ranaut and Vijay Devarakonda who shared their inspirational journey to success.

=== Theatre ===
In 2015, Sahukar teamed up with Bollywood actors Kalki Koechlin, Richa Chadda and Purab Kohli for a rib tickling play called Trivial Disasters directed by Atul Kuman and written by Ajay Krishnan. He was also a part of the digital revolution in Theatre as he played one of the seven clowns in Rajat Kapoor's creative rendition, I Don't Like It As You Like It of the Shakespeare's classic As You Like It.

=== Entrepreneurship ===
Along with his friend Samir Kochar, Cyrus started off his new venture, Kulcha Bros, a restaurant, in 2022.

== Personal life ==
Sahukar tied the knot in 2022, with his long-term partner Vaishali Malahara, at Alibaug.

== Selected works ==
- India's Got Talent
- It happens only in India
- Simi Garewal Show
- Worked as a VJ on MTV
- Played a role in Rang de Basanti, Delhi 6, Aisha and many more
- Played the role of Rishabh Malhotra in Mind the Malhotras
- Lead role in Potluck
- Hosted a travel show called Chill Out in 1999
- Piddhu the Great – a spoof on Navjot Singh Sidhu in 2000
- MTV Fully Faltoo Film festival – Bechare Zameen Par
- Kick Ass Mornings, where he played over 25 characters
- The first time MTV shot a mockumentary where he played Bobby Chadda and Paromita the Neurotic
- Nat Geo – hosted the International Spelling Bee
- Fox Life – Hosted Season 2 of the travel show The Great Escape with actor Kunal Kapoor in 2017
- MTV Housefull
- Hosted India's Got Talent on Colors in 2012
- Hosted Sab Khelo Sab Jeeto on SAB in 2013
- Panel member at Hoezaay YouTube channel Live streams (Ghost)

=== Events ===
- Style Awards for MTV India
- Corporate shows – Infosys, ICICI Bank, HSBC, Hindustan lever, Hewlett-Packard, HDFC, Birla Sun Life Insurance
- Launched all the Planet M stores in Mumbai, Delhi, Chandigarh and many other cities
- GQ Men of the Year
- ET Business awards

== Filmography ==
=== TV shows ===
Year	Title	Role
1999	Chill Out	Host
2000–2007	MTV Fully Faltoo	Multiple characters
2002	MTV Kya Baat Hai	Host
2002, 2009	MTV VJ Hunt	Host
2003	MTV Roadies Season 1	Host
2004	Cy Vs Cy	Host
2006	Business Bazigar	Host
2006–2007	Semi Girebaal (season 1 &2)	Host
2007–2010	Piddhu The Great	Host
2008	MTV Rap Game	Guest
2008	Hole In The Wall	Host
2008–2010	MTV Kickass Mornings	Host
2008	The Assignment Season 1	Host
2009	HDFC Spell Bee	Host
2009, 2019	Wild Wisdom Quiz	Quizmaster
2009	Roadies Season 7	Judge
2010	POGO All Stars	Host
2011	Wife Bina Life	Host
2012	Teenovators Season 1	Host
2012	India's Got Talent Season 4	Host
2013–2015	Sab Khelo Sab Jeeto	Host
2016	Challenge Accepted	Puppeteer, Host
2017	Great Escape Season 2	Host
2018	Masters of Taste	Guest
2018	Brain Wagon	Host
2018	Elevator Pitch	Host
2019	The Antisocial Network	Host
2019–22	Discovery School Super League	Host
2019	The Desi Variety Show	Host
2019	Sterling Reserve #Comedy Project	Host
2020	Feelin’ Alive Season 1 & 2	Host
2020	The Missing Apron	Host
2020	Atrangi Fireside Chat With Cyrus	Host
2020	Forbidden Angels	Judge
2021	The Lost Essence Season 2	Host
2022	It Happens Only in India	Host

=== Films ===
Year	Title	Role
2002	Om Jai Jagadish	Himself
2006	Rang De Basanti	Rahul
2009	Delhi 6	Suresh
2010	Aisha	Randhir Gambir
2011	The House Guest	Cyrus, Sacked VJ
2011	Love Breakups Zindagi	Govind
2014	Khoobsurat	Nausher Bandookwala
2014	Shaadi ke Baaad	Mahesh
2014	Words with God: God Room	Ali
2019	Kadakh	Sunil
2019	Shame	Mayank
2020	Maska	Himself
2022	Mia - The Untold Story	Raja Kumaar

=== OTT Shows/Web Series ===
Year	Title	Role
2013	The Bench	Host
2015	Living in a Man's World	Guest/Panellist
2016	Cadbury 5 Star One Tip One Hand	Host
2017	Office Vs Office	Hemant Aggarwal
2018	HDFC Life Young Stars	Judge/Mentor
2019–2022	Mind the Malhotras	Rishabh Malhotra
2019	Myntra Fashion Superstar	Guest Judge
2020	Kaun Banegi Shikharwati	Harsh Goel
2021–2023	Potluck	Vikrant Shastri
2026	Matka King	Maqsood

=== Theatre ===
Year	Title	Role
2015	Trivial Disasters	-
2018	I Don't Like It As You Like It	Soso The Clown
