= Iss Jungle Se Mujhe Bachao =

- Promotional logo
- Genre: Reality television
- Created by: ITV
- Based on: I'm a Celebrity...Get Me Out of Here!
- Country of origin: India
- Original languages: Hindi; English
- No. of seasons: 1
- No. of episodes: 40

Production
- Producers: Silverback (Sweden); Miditech (India)
- Running time: 60 minutes

Original release
- Network: Sony Entertainment Television
- Release: 13 July – 4 September 2009

Iss Jungle Se Mujhe Bachao (transl. Save me from this Jungle) premiered on 13 July 2009 on Sony TV. It was the first and only Indian series based on British reality game show I'm a Celebrity...Get Me Out of Here!. The winner of the show was Mona Wasu, who earned prize money of one crore rupees.

== Concept ==
The show is licensed from ITV's format, I'm a Celebrity...Get Me out of Here!. The basic concept is the same, where a group of celebrities have to survive in a jungle camp without any amenities, and must compete with each other to stay on in the show.

Every contestant gets a handful of rice and some soybean or lentils for food every three days, which is clearly not enough for survival. Therefore, they must participate in various physically challenging contests and win "food credits" for themselves and their team members. Each day, the team must nominate one participant to play in the day's contest and be the bread-winner for that day.

At the end of every week, the contestant with the fewest public votes and the contestant with the most elimination nominations from the participants face off in an elimination task called the "Maha Jungle Challenge". The winner of this challenge gets to stay back while the loser is eliminated from the game.

The audience can vote for their favorite participants via phone calls or SMS.

== Series overview ==
Season	Host(s)	Launch date	Finale date	Days	Celebrities	Winner
1	Mini Mathur and Yudhishthir Urs	13 July 2009	4 September 2009	54	15	Mona Wasu

== Season 1 ==
Iss Jungle Se Mujhe Bachao
- Season 1
- Presented by: Mini Mathur and Yudhishthir Urs
- No. of days: 54
- No. of contestants: 15
- Winner: Mona Wasu
- Runner-up: Chetan Hansraj
- Location: Taman Negara, Malaysia
- No. of episodes: 40

Release
- Original network: Sony Entertainment Television
- Original release: 2009

Ten Indian celebrities were chosen to participate in the only season. They were flown to Taman Negara in the rain-forests of Malaysia, where they had to stay in the jungle in an outdoor camp with little or no luxury amenities. Every contestant was allowed to carry any two luxury items of their choice, which they had to specify before the contest began. The ten celebrities were often divided into different sub-groups and made to compete among themselves every week.

=== Celebrities ===
Some more celebrities were introduced in later episodes as the original celebrities started getting eliminated.

The 10 original contestants were:

- Mona Wasu (winner) – Indian television actress.
- Chetan Hansraj (1st runner up) – Indian television actor.
- Anaida (2nd runner up) – 90's Pop icon
- Akashdeep Saigal – Indian Television actor.
- Aman Verma – Indian film and television actor
- Marc Robinson – Fashion director and grooming expert
- Shweta Tiwari (Quit) – Television actress and reality TV star
- Ishq Bector – Singer
- Palak Johal – Roadies fame
- Fiza Mohammad – Former wife of politician Chander Mohan.

The 5 wildcards were:

- Negar Khan – Model
- Jay Bhanushali – Indian television and film actor
- Mika Singh – Popular singer
- Chitrashi Rawat – Indian actress
- Kashmera Shah – Film actress

=== Elimination table ===
Each week the audience votes to save their favourite celebrity to stay in the jungle. The celebrities with the lowest votes face each other off in the "Maha Jungle Challenge" after which the loser is evicted from the jungle.

Contestants	No. 1	No. 2	No. 3	No. 4	No. 5	No. 6	No. 7	No. 8	No. 9	No. 10	Finale
Mona	Safe							Bottom two	Safe	Immune	Winner
Chetan	Safe			Bottom two	Safe						Runner-up
Anaida	Bottom two		Safe				Bottom two	Safe		Bottom two	Evicted (Day 54)
Akashdeep	Safe								Bottom two	Bottom two	Evicted (Day 52)
Jay	Not in the Jungle (Entered, Day 22)			Safe	Bottom two		Safe		Bottom two	Evicted (Day 50)	
Aman	Safe		Bottom two	Safe				Bottom two	Evicted (Day 47)		
Kashmera	Not in the Jungle (Entered, Day 37)				Safe		Quit (Day 46)				
Marc	Safe						Bottom two	Evicted (Day 44)			
Chitrashi	Not in the Jungle (Entered, Day 22)			Safe		Bottom two	Evicted (Day 40)				
Mika	Not in the Jungle (Entered, Day 22)			Safe	Bottom two	Evicted (Day 33)					
Negar	Not in the Jungle (Entered, Day 13)		Safe	Bottom two	Evicted (Day 26)						
Palak	Safe		Bottom two	Evicted (Day 19)							
Shweta	Safe		Quit (Day 13)								
Fiza	Safe	Bottom two	Evicted (Day 12)								
IshQ	Bottom two	Evicted (Day 5)									
Winning Team/Contestant	Blue Team	Yellow Team	Blue Team	Yellow Team	Marc	Akashh	Jay	Jay	Anaida	Mona	Mona
Survivor	Anaida	Anaida	Aman	Chetan	Jay	Jay	Anaida	Mona	Akashh	Anaida	Mona
Quit	None		Shweta	None			Kashmera	None			
Face-off Challengers	IshQ; Anaida	Anaida; Fiza	Palak; Aman	Chetan; Negar	Mika; Jay	Jay; Chitrashi	Mark; Anaida	Mona; Aman	Akashh; Jay	Anaida; Akashh	Chetan
Evicted	IshQ	Fiza	Palak	Negar	Mika	Chitrashi	Mark	Aman	Jay	Akashdeep	Anaida

Red Team/Merged Team
Yellow Team
Blue Team
