= Pranava Prakash =

Indian artist working in neopop style (born 1979)

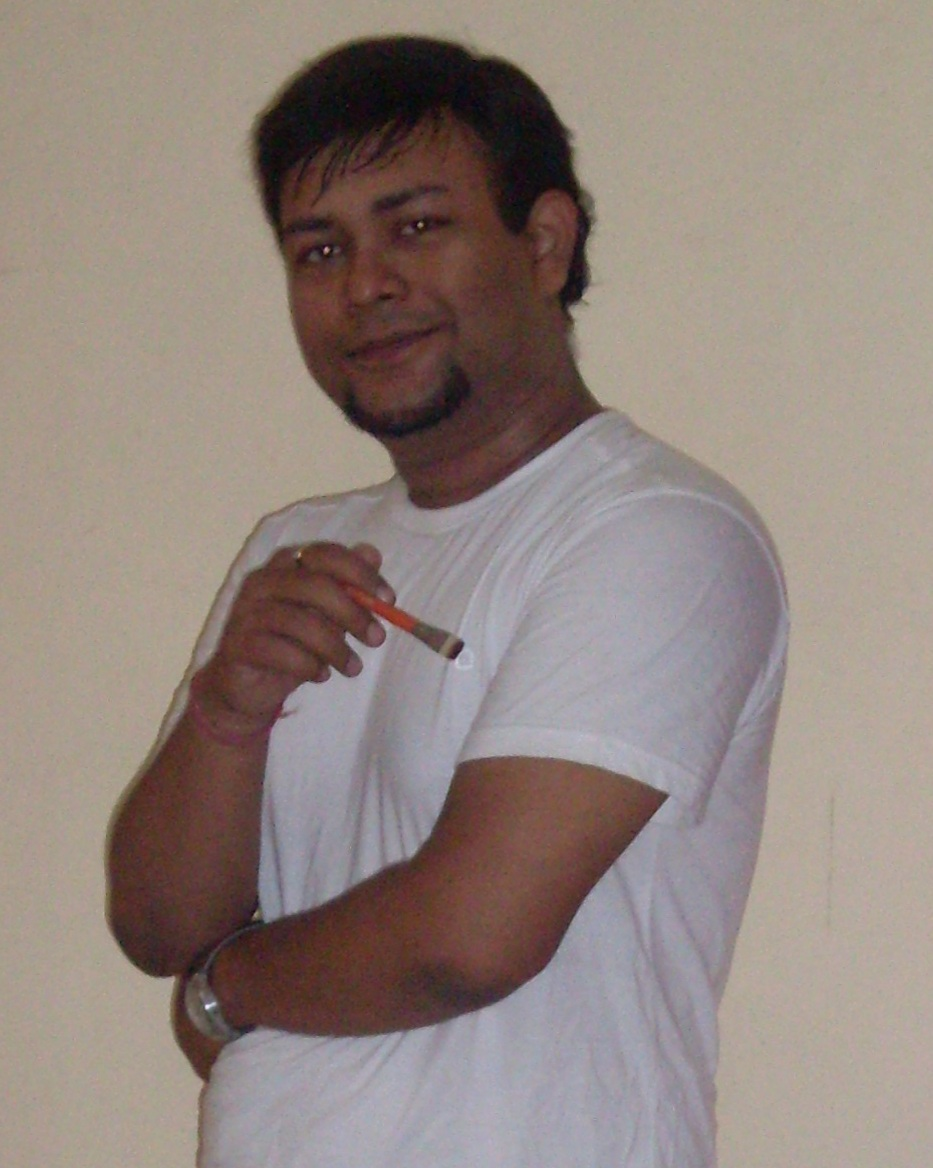
- Pranava Prakash in Gallery
- Born: 10 February 1979 (age 47); Patna, Bihar, India
- Education: NMCH, Patna, Institute of Management Technology, Ghaziabad
- Known for: pop art, installation art, painting
- Notable work: The Goddess of Fifteen Minutes of Fame, Your Turn, Chal Hat Be Bihari
- Movement: Socio Pop Art
- Awards: Obra De Art Annual Medal, 2009

Pranava Prakash (Hindi: प्रणव प्रकाश; born in Patna in 1979) is an Indian artist working in neopop style. He is known for helping to create the "tuchchart" style with a group of Delhi artists, which he debuted in a 2007 show in Delhi entitled "Tuchchart".Prakash is also known for drawing inspiration for his works from various sociopolitical issues such as xenophobia, frequently depicting various persons in the nude.

== Background ==
Prakash was born in Patna, Bihar, India in 1979 and attended the Institute of Management Technology, Ghaziabad and Nalanda Medical College in Patna, where he graduated with an MBA and a MBBS.

== Controversies ==
Prakash has received controversy over some of his works, with some of the galleries featuring his paintings being vandalized and Prakash himself being assaulted over the depiction of nude celebrities. Other paintings that have received controversy include his Your Turn painting, which depicted Indian painter M.F. Husain in the nude. Prakash stated that he had been inspired to paint the picture due to the reactions of several female painters over Husain's "depiction of the fairer sex in uncompromising positions". He had attempted to submit the painting for showings and was repeatedly rejected until its appearance in the AIFACS gallery in New Delhi.

His painting Goddess of Fifteen Minutes of fame also received criticism for depicted Arundhati Roy, Osama bin Laden, and Chairman Mao Zedong in the nude. Opinions on the work differed, with some seeing the work as creative expression while the painting prompted the Lalit Kala Academy to cancel a scheduled showing with him. The decision was protested by the group Socio Pop, who burnt a paint brush and stated they would abstain from painting until Prakash's work was shown.

== RadhaMohan Award ==
Prakash got annual award for 2013 in painting category, instated by the government of Bihar at Patna by Chief Minister Nitish Kumar. The citation mentioned his contribution of ‘Your Turning’ and ‘Goddess of Fifteen Minutes of fame’ which raised debate.
