= Mind the Malhotras =

2019 Indian family drama series

- Mind the Malhotras on Prime Video
- Genre: Comedy drama Family drama
- Based on: La Famiglia
- Written by: Karan Shrikant Sharma; Sahil Sangha
- Directed by: Sahil Sangha; Ajay Bhuyan
- Starring: Mini Mathur; Cyrus Sahukar; Denzil Smith; Sushmita Mukherjee; (For detailed cast see below)
- Country of origin: India
- Original language: English
- No. of seasons: 2
- No. of episodes: 19

Production
- Producers: Dia Mirza; Sahil Sangha; Sameer Nair; Deepak Segal
- Cinematography: Athit Naik, Anshuman Singh Thakur
- Editors: Sherwin Bernard, Shubhra Joshi
- Running time: 23-30 minutes
- Production companies: Applause Entertainment; Born Free Entertainment

Original release
- Network: Amazon Prime Video India
- Release: 7 June 2019 – 12 August 2022

Mind the Malhotras is an Indian sitcom based on Israeli comedy La Famiglia, which follows the lives of Malhotra family, a couple seek therapy to guarantee that they do not end up divorced like their friends. It is available on Amazon Prime Video from 7 June 2019. It is directed by Sahil Sangha and Ajay Bhuyan starring Mini Mathur, Cyrus Sahukar, Denzil Smith, Sushmita Mukherjee and Anandita Pagnis. The series was renewed for a second season which becomes available on 12 August 2022.

== Premise ==
When yet another married couple within their friend circle files for divorce, Rishabh and Shefali Malhotra fear that their marriage too may just be a ticking time bomb waiting to explode. They decide to seek professional help from a therapist who dredges up the most embarrassing and bizarre moments in the Malhotras' family life ranging from the quality of their sex life, the quirks of their three kids and the antics of Rishabh’s annoying mother.

== Cast and characters ==
=== Main ===
- Mini Mathur as Shefali 'Shef' Malhotra (Wife)
- Cyrus Sahukar as Rishabh 'Rish' Malhotra (Husband)
- Denzil Smith as Dr. Gulfam Rastogi (Therapist)
- Sushmita Mukherjee as Seema Malhotra/Mummyji (Rishabh's mother)
- Anandita Pagnis as Jia Malhotra (Daughter of Rishabh and Shefali)
- Nikki Sharma as Dia Malhotra (Daughter of Rishabh and Shefali)
- Jason D'souza as Yohan 'Yoyo' Malhotra (Son)
- Rahul Verma as Zoravar 'Zoru' (House help)
- Dalip Tahil as Roshan (Seema's new boyfriend) (Season 2)
- Samir Kochhar as Rishabh Jain (Shef's ex-boyfriend) (Season 2)
- Maria Goretti as Chef Maria (Season 2)
- Neal Punmiya as Pratik
- Asheesh Kapur as Surya (Friend)
- Parinita Seth as Vaishali (Friend)
- Shivani Singh as Radha 'Rads' (Neighbour)
- Rajat Kaul as Shyam
- Kabir Jai Bedi as Rocky (Jia's boyfriend) (Season 2)
- Poojan Chhabra as Yug (Dia's boyfriend) (Season 2)
- Micky Makhija as Bharat Gupta (Season 2)

=== Guest ===
- Simran Sharma as Aadhe Ma
- Uday Nene as Arjun
- Baldev Tehran as Badminton coach
- Brinda Parekh as Kanta Kapoor
- Ali Fazal as Himself
- Rajat Khatri as Badrinath
- Abhishek Mistry as Gym Manager
- Sandeep Sharma as Pandit ji
- Devansh Daswani as Rustom

== Episodes ==
| No. | Title | Directed by | Written by | Original release date |
|---|---|---|---|---|
| 1 | "Meet the Malhotras" | Sahil Sangha | Karan Shrikant Sharma and Sahil Sangha | 7 June 2019 |
| 2 | "Mother-in-Law" | Ajay Bhuyan | Karan Shrikant Sharma and Sahil Sangha | 7 June 2019 |
| 3 | "Correctile Dysfunction" | Ajay Bhuyan | Karan Shrikant Sharma and Sahil Sangha | 7 June 2019 |
| 4 | "He Says, She Says" | Ajay Bhuyan | Karan Shrikant Sharma and Sahil Sangha | 7 June 2019 |
| 5 | "Good Parenting" | Ajay Bhuyan | Karan Shrikant Sharma and Sahil Sangha | 7 June 2019 |
| 6 | "Out of Control" | Ajay Bhuyan | Karan Shrikant Sharma and Sahil Sangha | 7 June 2019 |
| 7 | "Just Another Day" | Ajay Bhuyan | Karan Shrikant Sharma and Sahil Sangha | 7 June 2019 |
| 8 | "Money Matters" | Ajay Bhuyan | Karan Shrikant Sharma and Sahil Sangha | 7 June 2019 |
| 9 | "A Mid Life Break" | Ajay Bhuyan | Karan Shrikant Sharma and Sahil Sangha | 7 June 2019 |

== Production ==
In November 2018, Applause Entertainment announced comedy series Mind The Malhotras based on Israeli comedy, ‘La Famiglia’. Mini Mathur and Cyrus Sahukar were cast in lead roles supported by ensemble cast of Anandita Pagnis, Nikki Sharma, Jason D'souza, Sushmita Mukherjee and Denzil Smith. It is directed by Sahil Sangha and Ajay Bhuyan. And, co produced by Sahil Sangha and Dia Mirza of Born Free Entertainment and Sameer Nair of Applause Entertainment. Sameer Nair, CEO of Applause Entertainment in a statement said, "The premise of the series is very unique, and yet completely relatable with the modern Indian audience." Mini Mathur pitched in, “I was able to identify with the character of Shefali almost instantly.” Cyrus Sahukar stated “In today’s day and age, the very premise of a show which sees a couple that has three children, seek therapy, and recount all the embarrassing and awkward shenanigans that they get up to as a family makes for hilarious viewing.”

== Promotion and release ==
On 28 May official trailer was released by Amazon Prime Video India on various social media platforms.

== Reception ==
Akhil Arora writing for the Gadgets 360 of NDTV feels, "Series is a run-of-the-mill adaptation, that doesn't ever look up, let alone aim high."
