= Anaida =

Indian singer and chef

Anaida Parvaneh
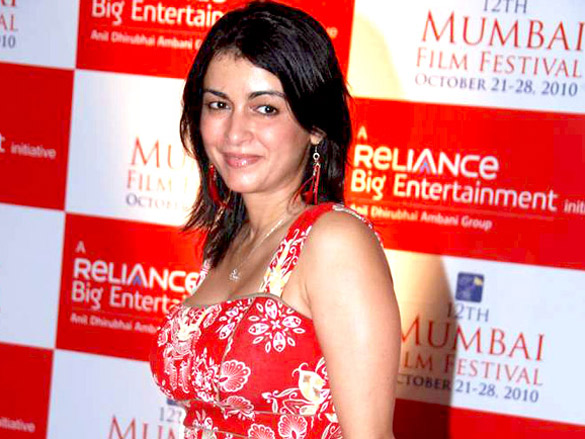
- Anaida at the 12th Mumbai Film Festival in October 2010
- Born: Iran
- Occupations: Singer; Spiritual Healer; Chef
- Years active: 1995–present

Anaida Parvaneh (born 1980) is an Indian singer and chef. She was the first singer to release a single in India in 1995. She is currently a chef with the Soda Bottle Opener Wala chain of cafes and she works as a Chinese healer.

== Background ==
A Parsi Zoroastrian of Indian-Greek-Iranian heritage, Anaida was one of India's first pop singers in the 1990s. She has launched 10 albums and scores of singles, in Hindi, English, Tamil, Malayalam, Punjabi, Greek, and Arabic since then.

She has acted in Hindi movies and made guest appearances in numerous television shows. She had worked in the 1995 movie Tum Karo Vaada.

== Career ==
Anaida's "Hot Line" song from her debut album, "Love Today Hai Nahi Asaan" was the first released single of India. The song "Hoo Halla Hoo" from her second album "Nazuk Nazuk" was the first 3D animated video produced in India. She was the first female Hindi pop artist to be featured on "Buddha Bar" with her song "Good Day to Die" sung in English. She has performed around the globe in different languages.

== Discography ==
=== As singer ===
Year	Song	Album	Composer	Lyricist	Label
1995	Hot Line	Love Today Hai Nahi Asaan	Charles Sequeria Vaz	Sandra Richards	Sony Music
1995	Ladki Aajki	Love Today Hai Nahi Asaan	Charles Sequeria Vaz	Sandra Richards	Sony Music
1995	Manchali Mehbooba	Love Today Hai Nahi Asaan	Charles Sequeria Vaz	Sandra Richards	Sony Music
1995	Oh Jaan Meri	Love Today Hai Nahi Asaan	Charles Sequeria Vaz	Sandra Richards	Sony Music
1995	Love Today Hai Nahi Asaan	Love Today Hai Nahi Asaan	Charles Sequeria Vaz	Sandra Richards	Sony Music
1995	Dil Le Le	Love Today Hai Nahi Asaan	Charles Sequeria Vaz	Sandra Richards	Sony Music
1995	Dance Medley	Love Today Hai Nahi Asaan	Charles Sequeria Vaz	Sandra Richards	Sony Music
1995	Oh Jaana	Love Today Hai Nahi Asaan	Charles Sequeria Vaz	Sandra Richards	Sony Music
1995	I Am Anaida	Love Today Hai Nahi Asaan	Charles Sequeria Vaz	Sandra Richards	Sony Music
1995	Kasam Se Hai Dil	Love Today Hai Nahi Asaan	Charles Sequeria Vaz	Sandra Richards	Sony Music
1996	Oova Oova	Nazuk Nazuk	Santosh Nair	Manohar Iyer	Sony Music
1996	Hoo Halla Hoo	Nazuk Nazuk	Santosh Nair	Manohar Iyer	Sony Music
1996	Hilori	Nazuk Nazuk	Santosh Nair	Manohar Iyer	Sony Music
1996	Ho Jaa Ho Jaa	Nazuk Nazuk	Santosh Nair	Manohar Iyer	Sony Music
1996	Ik Ladka Sidha Sadha	Nazuk Nazuk	Santosh Nair	Manohar Iyer	Sony Music
1996	Nazuk Nazuk	Nazuk Nazuk	Santosh Nair	Manohar Iyer	Sony Music
1999	Jamale	Chori Chori	Santosh Nair	Manohar Iyer	Sony Music
1999	Umer Umer	Chori Chori	Santosh Nair	Manohar Iyer	Sony Music
1999	Kaachi Kali	Chori Chori	Ira Roshan	Maya Govind	Sony Music
1999	Oonchi Neechi	Chori Chori	Ira Roshan	Maya Govind	Sony Music
1999	Jamale	Chori Chori	Ira Roshan	Maya Govind	Sony Music
1999	Naino Se Naina	Chori Chori	Ira Roshan	Maya Govind	Sony Music
1999	Ankh Maar Gaya	Chori Chori	Ira Roshan	Maya Govind	Sony Music
1999	Chori Chori	Chori Chori	Ira Roshan	Maya Govind	Sony Music
1999	Aaja Aaja	Chori Chori	Ira Roshan	Maya Govind	Sony Music
1999	Main Hoon Gujaria	Chori Chori	Ira Roshan	Maya Govind	Sony Music

=== As playback singer ===
Year	Film	Song	Composer(s)	Lyrics Writer(s)	Co-singer(s)
2001	Chori Chori Chupke Chupke	"Diwani Diwani"	Anu Malik	Sameer	Anu Malik
2001	Mujhe Meri Biwi Se Bachaao	"Kahoji Tumse Acha Kaun Hai"	Rajesh Roshan	Majrooh Sultanpuri	Sonu Nigam
2008	Bujjigadu	"Talaiva"	Sandeep Chowta	Bhaskara Bhatla	Mark Lazaro
2008	Chamku	"Trance"	Monty Sharma	Sameer	Saleem Shahzada, Sowmya Raoh

== Filmography ==
=== Television ===
Year	Title	Role	Notes
2006	Fun on the Run	Contestant	
2008	Dhoom Macha De	Contestant	
2009	Iss Jungle Se Mujhe Bachao	Contestant	2nd runner-up
