= Institute of Management Technology, Ghaziabad =

Business Schools in India

Coordinates: 28.6743°N 77.4488°E

- Motto: Grooming Leadership through Innovation, Execution and Social Responsibility
- Type: Unaided - Private Business School
- Established: 1980; 46 years ago
- President: Bakul Nath
- Director: Dr. Atish Chattopadhyay
- Location: Raj Nagar Ghaziabad, Uttar Pradesh, India
- Campus: Fully residential
- Website: imt.edu

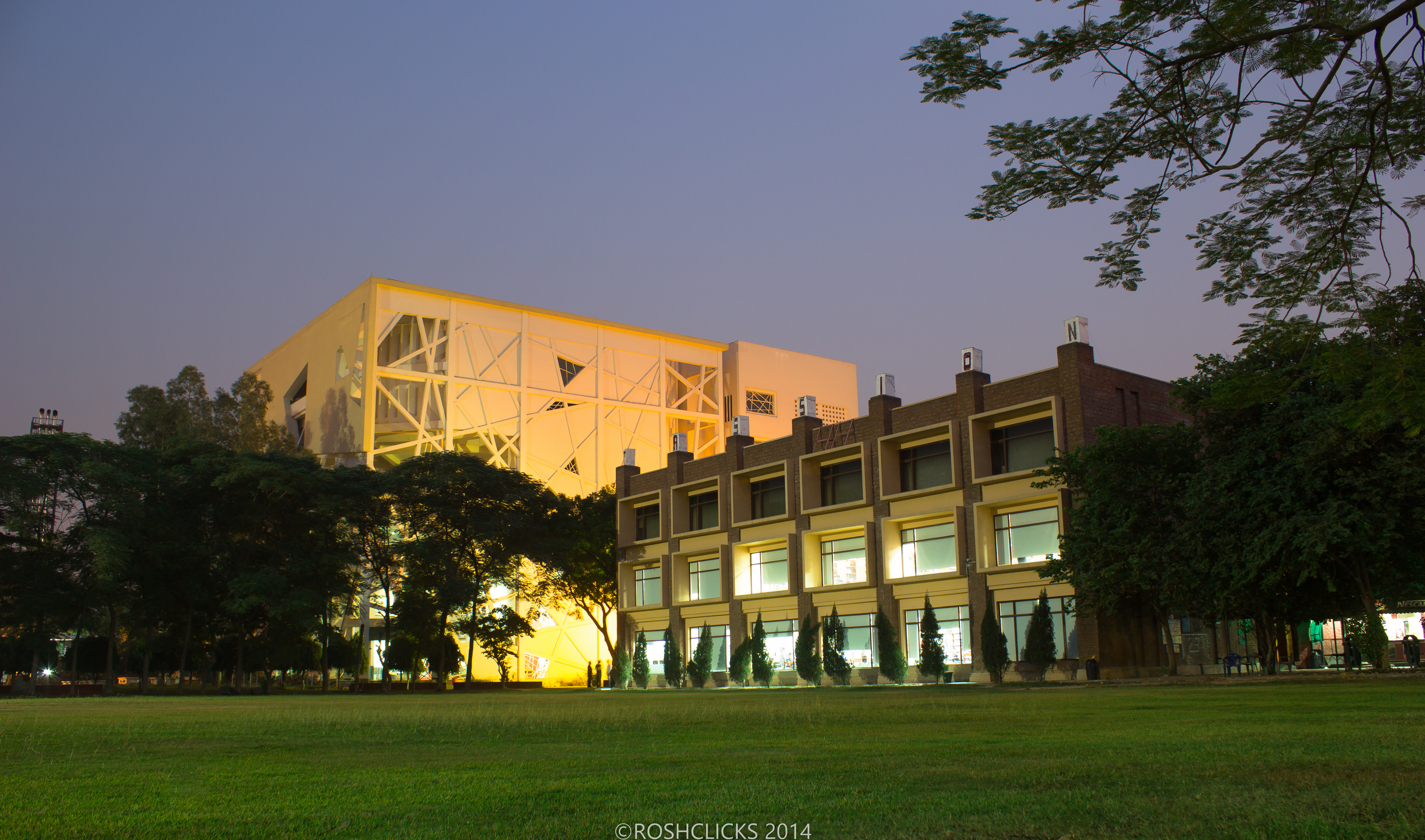
New Academic Block & Library, IMT Ghaziabad

Institute of Management Technology, Ghaziabad, abbreviated as IMT G, is a private business school with its main campus at Ghaziabad in the Indian state of Uttar Pradesh.

It offers postgraduate diploma and executive education programmes in management. It also offers distance learning and collaborative programmes.

== History ==
The Dr. K. Nath Public Trust was created by Shri Mahendra Nath with the goal of creating and supporting trade schools and institutes of higher education. The trust's initiatives include running libraries and helping impoverished students undertake higher education at several institutes, including the Indian Institute of Technology and the Indian Institute of Management. The trust helped establish IMT with financial assistance from the Lajpat Rai Educational Society in 1980 with the IMT awarded AICTE approval in 1983.

Kanishka Pandey serves as the head of the sports research centre at Institute of Management Technology.

=== Academic Block ===
IMT Ghaziabad has two academic blocks to provide learning space, one two-storey and one five-storey based on Italian architecture . It comprises lecture theaters, faculty rooms, computer lab, break rooms and a conference room. All lecture theaters are air-conditioned.

=== Housing ===
The campus hosts 10 student-housing blocks and a separate block housing Management Development Program participants. Hostels provide both single and double occupancy. IMT Ghaziabad also has an auxiliary campus on Meerut Road. This campus houses the IMT Centre for Distance Learning (IMT CDL), boys hostel buildings, mess hall, lawn tennis court and a canteen. Hostel buildings on this campus house most of the first year male PGDM course students. It is at a distance of roughly 2 km from the main IMT Ghaziabad campus.

== Rankings ==
IMT was ranked #7 among the best Indian B-Schools by Economic Times in 2018, and 5th in India by Outlook India's "Top 150 Private MBA Institutions" of 2024.

In the year 2022, it was ranked as the #4 Indian B-School in the country by Times B-School Survey and #35 among management schools in India by the National Institutional Ranking Framework (NIRF) in 2024, IMT Ghaziabad has been ranked 11th Overall and 5th in Private in B School ranking 2024 by Business Today and as the 13th Overall in B School ranking 2021 & 6th in Private by The Week in 2024.

=== Admissions ===
IMT G has a three-step admission procedure. The top percentiles in CAT/XAT/GMAT are called in for a group discussion/activity in major cities. Potential enrollees are evaluated on their profiles. The discussion/activity is followed by a personal interview with two faculty members. The students having the maximum combined score are then given a final call. Rights of admission are reserved to the administration.

=== Faculty ===
IMT has 60+ core faculty. IMT adds visiting faculty numbering around 35 from industry and other academic institutions.

=== Placements ===
The placement season at Institute of Management Technology (IMT) Ghaziabad for the PGDM programme 2020-22 batch has ended with 100% placements.

=== Research ===
The school produces the Paradigm journal, published by Sage Publications

== Notable alumni ==
Alumni of the university include:

- Sachin Pilot, Former Deputy Chief Minister of Rajasthan, former Minister of State in the Ministry of Corporate Affairs
- Nimmagadda Prasad, chairman, MAA TV; vice chairman & founder, Matrix Laboratories
- Prasoon Joshi, eminent advertising personality and regional creative director, APAC, McCann Erickson
- Pranava Prakash, Noted Sociopop Artist
- Mini Mathur, Indian Host/Actress/Model
- Rajeev Karwal, Founder Milagrow
- Prachi Tehlan, Actor/former National sportswoman
- Rudratej Singh, Ex-President and CEO, BMW India (d 2020)
- Naaz Joshi, India's first transgender international beauty queen, a trans rights activist and a motivational speaker
- Nitin Tyagi, Indian politician and member of the Sixth Legislative Assembly of Delhi in India

== See also ==
- Institute of Management Technology, Hyderabad
- Institute of Management Technology, Dubai
- Institute of Management Technology, Nagpur
- Institute of Management Technology, Center for Distance Learning, Ghaziabad
