= Mini Mathur =

Indian television host, actor and model (born 1972)

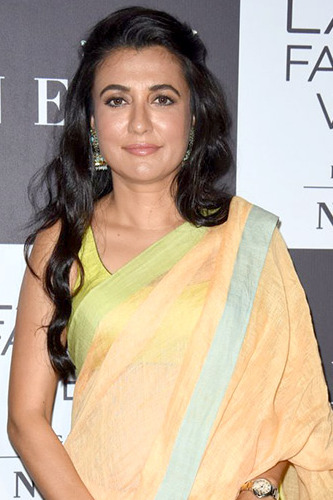
- Mini on Lakme Fashion Week 2017
- Born: 21 August 1972 (age 54); New Delhi, India
- Education: Delhi Public School, RK Puram, Lady Shri Ram College for Women, University of Delhi, Institute of Management Technology, Ghaziabad
- Spouse: Kabir Khan
- Children: 2

Mini Mathur (born 21 August 1972) is an Indian television host, actor and model. She was the host of the Indian reality singing contest Indian Idol for 6 seasons. Earlier, she was a VJ on MTV India where she hosted many shows. She has a bachelor's degree in English literature and an MBA in marketing from IMT Ghaziabad and recently played the lead in the Amazon original series Mind the Malhotras for which she received 7 best actor awards for her role as Shefali Malhotra. She hosts the Discovery School Super League on Discovery India and is the producer presenter of her travel series Minime, the first season of which aired on TLC. She also hosted an interview show with politicians, industrialists and opinion makers called Dilli dil se. She also was a contestant in the second season of Jhalak Dikhhla Jaa in 2007.

== Career ==
Mini is one of the most popular TV hosts in India. She holds a degree in English literature from Lady Sriram College and in business management from Institute of Management Technology, Ghaziabad.

She started her career as an advertising professional at J Walter Thompson, New Delhi through IMT Campus Placement. A chance opportunity to be the face of Ray-ban sunglasses led her to many more modelling assignments and her first game show on Indian television called Tol mol ke Bol. Several more game and quiz shows and a travel show led her to Mumbai where she joined as a VJ, after a contest where she impersonated Simi Garewal interviewing Mamta Kulkarni.

In four years at MTV Mini hosted concerts by international artists, interviewed film and pop stars, appear on youth campuses, give advice on love, and play classic tracks. At MTV, she presented Bombay Blush, a culture show on India that aired in the UK. She hosted 2 seasons of the show on BBC2.

She returned to mass entertainment with the first edition of the smash hit, Indian Idol and continued to be a favorite for 3 seasons. She took a break to have a baby. She did several shows on music thereafter. Having accumulated goodwill among musicians. Yeh shaam Mastani, an interview-based concert series. Mini then stepped into the jungles of Taman Negara in Malaysia for 2 months to host the first season of Iss Jungle Se Mujhe Bachao live, the Indian edition of "I'm a celebrity, get me out of here".

She appeared as a celebrity contestant on Jhalak Dikhlaja Season 2. She then hosted a hardcore sports quiz show called Sports ka Superstar which gave her a chance to hone her sports knowledge and appear on two seasons of Kaun Banega Crorepati (Who Wants to be a Millionaire) as an expert lifeline. She returned to host Indian Idol season 6 in 2012. She also hosted BYJU's Discovery School Super League season 1 along with Cyrus Sahukar in 2019 which aired on Discovery Channel.

She hosts an interview show with politicians, industrialists, and opinion makers on DD, the national channel. Known for her sense of style and her love for vibrantly coloured handloom sarees, Mini appeared in many ad campaigns for Ultra doux, L'Oreal and Comfort.

In 2026 she participated in the Amazon Prime reality show The Alliance season 1 where she emerged as the winner taking home the trophy and 50 Lakhs prize money.

== Personal life ==
Mini Mathur resides in Mumbai with her husband, film director Kabir Khan as well as her children, Vivaan and Sairah.

== Television ==
- Tol Mol Ke Bol Zee TV (Host)
- Hit Thi Hit Hai (Host)
- Hit Hit Hurray (Host)
- Tandav Zee TV (Actress)
- Vakaalat Zee TV ( Actress)
- Khoobsurat Zee TV (Host)
- Khwahish Sony TV (Actress)
- Indian Holiday Zee TV (Host)
- MTV (1999-2003) (VJ)
- Bombay Blush (Host)
- Indian Idol 1 Sony TV (Host)
- Popkorn ZOOM (Host)
- Miss India Pageant (Host)
- Sirf Ek Minute Mein Sahara ONE (Host)
- Yeh Shaam Mastani (Sony) (host)
- Indian Idol 2 Sony TV (Host)
- Indian Idol 3 Sony TV (Host)
- Jhalak Dikhhla Jaa 2 (Contestant)
- Iss Jungle Se Mujhe Bachao Sony (Host)
- Wife Bina Life Star Plus (Host)
- Sports ka Superstar (Host)
- Indian Idol 6 Sony TV (Host)
- Dilli Dil Se Aaj Tak (Host)
- Kaun Banega Crorepati
- A Nation Celebrates (Producer)
- From Corner Shops to Lords (Producer)
- Discovery School Super League (Quiz Master)
- Mind the Malhotras on Amazon Prime Originals
- Call Me Bae (2024)
- Alliance (2026) (Contestant & winner)

== Films ==
Year	Film	Role	Notes
2002	Dil Vil Pyar Vyar	Herself	Guest appearance
2013	I, Me Aur Main	Shivani	
2019	Mind the Malhotras	Mrs Shefali Malhotra	Series
