= Kaniska Kulasekera =

Sri Lankan cricketer (born 1973)

Kaniska Kulasekera (born 23 April 1973) was a Sri Lankan cricketer. He was a right-handed batsman and left-arm slow bowler who played for Colts Cricket Club. He was born in Colombo.

Kulasekera made a single first-class appearance for the side, during the 1995–96 season, against Singha Sports Club. From the tailend, he scored 6 runs in the only innings in which he batted.

In 11 overs of bowling, he took figures of 1-61, taking the wicket of Saman Jayantha.
