= Stuttgart Institute of Management and Technology =

Coordinates: 48.7113273°N 9.2005504°E

The Stuttgart Institute of Management and Technology (SIMT) was founded in 1998 as an international Business School and Further Education Institute offering both full-time and part-time programs leading to the academic degree "Master of Business Administration (MBA)" of the Universität Stuttgart. The cooperation of both higher education institutions also includes further education programs in the fields of Business Administration, Engineering, Natural and Social Sciences.

SIMT is an advanced education institute of the Steinbeis University Berlin (SHB). The school is state accredited.

In 1998 SIMT was founded as an international graduate school of management at university level in Stuttgart on the initiative of a number of renowned global players headquartered in the Stuttgart area, among them Bosch, Daimler, Agilent, Siemens and Trumpf. SIMT offers a practice- and team-oriented, state-accredited and internationally acknowledged Master of Business Administration (MBA) program - full-time and part-time - in English including an optional exchange program with renowned international partner universities.
