= Kanishka Pandey =

Sports researcher

- Born: Aligarh, Uttar Pradesh
- Education: Bachelor of Arts; LLB
- Alma mater: St Stephens College, Delhi; Faculty of Law, University of Delhi
- Occupations: Founder President, Sports: A Way of Life

Kanishka Pandey is an Indian sports researcher, writer, and the head of sports research center at the Institute of Management Technology, Ghaziabad. He is the founder President of non-profit and non-governmental organization Sports: A Way of Life. He has been awarded the Honorary Doctorate for his research on Sports Philosophy.

== Early life ==
Kanishka was born in Aligarh district of Uttar Pradesh and raised in the state capital of Lucknow. His father, Ajai Shanker Pandey, was a senior IAS officer of UP. Kanishka is a former badminton player. He started playing badminton when he was 8 and represented his schools and college at the district and state level. He completed his school education at St Francis’ College, Lucknow. He graduated with a Bachelor of Arts from St Stephens College, Delhi and holds an LLB.

== Career ==
Kanishka began his academic research on sports while he was pursuing his LLB from the Faculty of Law, University of Delhi. The research concluded after 3 years and was to measure the impact of sports on an individual's physical and mental health, which led to the formation of Sports: A Way of Life.

Kanishka formed the NGO in Uttar Pradesh in 2017 to increase sports literacy in the country. In August 2017, the foundation launched its first programme called Sports Literacy Mission at the Indian Habitat Centre, New Delhi in the presence of Arjuna, Dronacharya, and Paralympians awardees from a variety of sports. The programme aimed to sensitize parents and children about the significance of sports.

Kanishka with his team carried out a countrywide survey to gauge the public interest in various sports activities and concluded that "less than 5% people have interest in sports whereas less than 2% females were interested in sports."

In 2018 Kanishka submitted a memorandum to the Governor of Rajasthan and the chancellor of state universities, Kalyan Singh calling for inclusion of sports philosophy in syllabus of higher education institutions. After reviewing his proposal, a letter was sent by the governor's office to the vice chancellors of all the state universities and the state government for their suggestions on the matter. The Government of Rajasthan formed a committee consisting of five members headed by the vice chancellor of the Govind Guru Tribal University Kailash Sodhani in August 2018 to seek suggestions regarding implementation of subject Khel Darshan in all state run universities, syllabus, and how to better sports facilities in Rajasthan. A notice was subsequently issued by the governor's office to all the state universities urging to include sports philosophy as a compulsory subsidiary subject for college and university students in the state.

Kanishka wrote to the Human Resource Development Minister of India Prakash Javadekar to include sports in school syllabus. In 2019, he spoke at the national sports seminar held in Delhi, where he presented a research paper urging parents to adopt the carrot and stick policy to build sports aptitude in their kids, before they get enrolled in Kindergarten class.

Kanishka has called for the Government of India to make Right to Sports a fundamental right under section 21A by filling a Public Interest Litigation (PIL) in the Supreme Court citing the report of the Institute of Management Technology which says "Only 5.56% of the population in India have knowledge of sports. The percentage of women in it is 1.31%. 5.7 million people are directly or indirectly connected. Sports literacy in the USA is 20%. In China alone about ten million people take up badminton. If the rest of the games are added then the tally of China will overtake that of the USA."

In 2020 Institute of Management Technology (IMT) collaborated with Sports: A Way of Life and selected two villages of Muzaffarnagar, Bahadurpur and Khedi Viran, to develop them as Model Sports Villages under Adarsh Khel Gram programme.

He has authored several books and published research papers in national and international journals. His first book titled Sports: A Way of Life was acclaimed by vice chancellors of Indian universities and was also presented to the former President of India, Late Pranab Mukherjee.

== Books ==
- Sports: A Way of Life
- Khel Praveshika
- Know Sports
- Chalo Khelon Ki Or

== Achievements ==
- Sports Philosophy as a compulsory subject was introduced in the state universities of Rajasthan in 2018 based on his recommendation
- Devised the concept of Indirect Sports Therapy for improving the mental health of COVID-19 Patients
- Devised the concept of Model Sports Village
