= Kiera Chaplin =

American model, businesswoman and actress (born 1982)

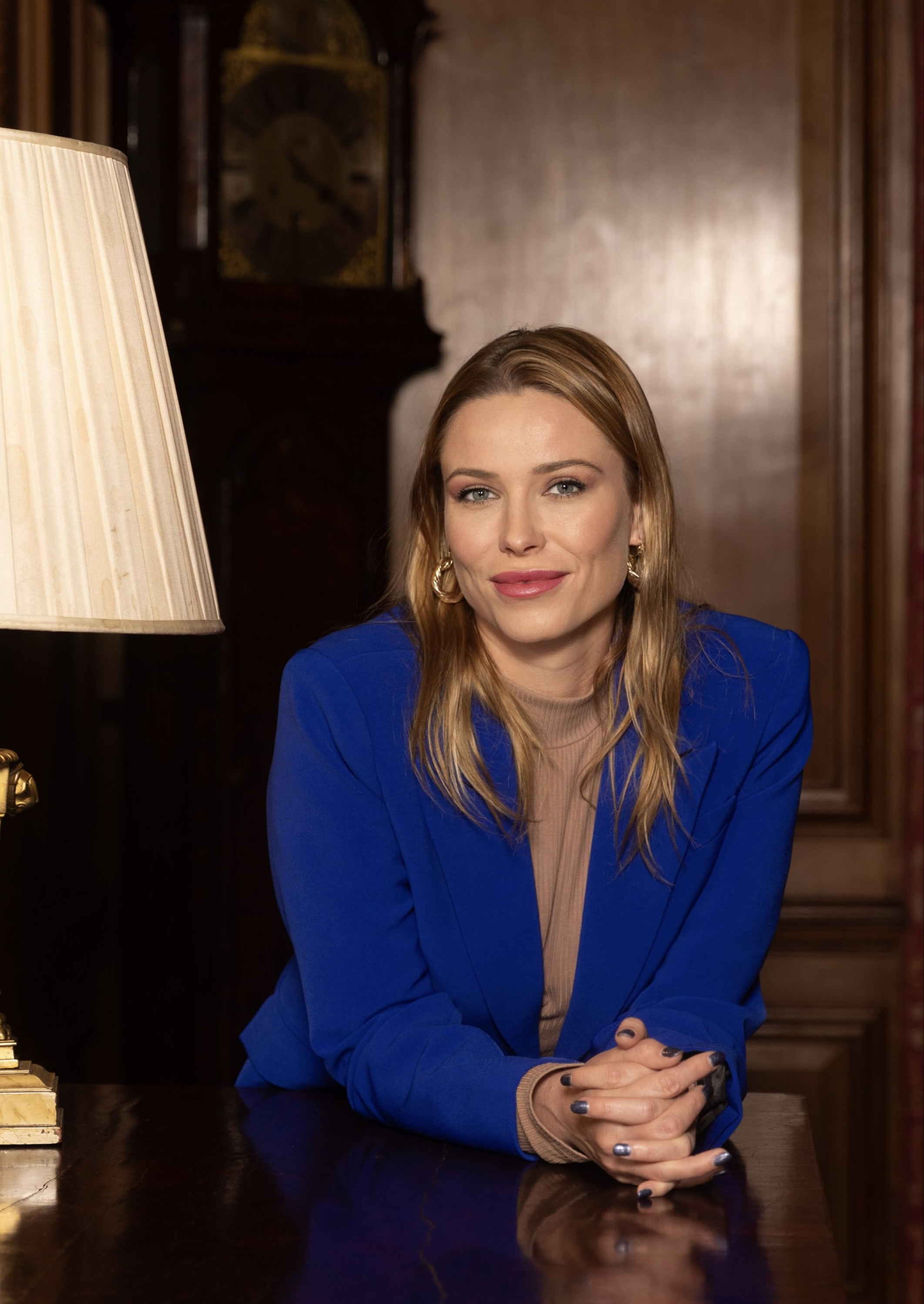
- Chaplin in 2024
- Born: 1 July 1982 (age 44); Belfast, Northern Ireland
- Spouse: Alexandre Alé de Basseville (m. 2004–2006)
- Parent: Eugene Chaplin
- Modeling information
- Height: 5 ft 8 in (1.73 m)
- Hair color: Blonde
- Eye color: Blue
- Agency: IMG Models; M Management

Kiera Chaplin (born 1 July 1982) is a Northern Irish model, businesswoman and actress. She is the granddaughter of actor Charlie Chaplin and the great-granddaughter of playwright Eugene O'Neill.

== Biography ==
Chaplin was born in Belfast, the eldest daughter of Eugene Chaplin and his wife, Bernadette. She grew up in the same town as her father, in Corsier-sur-Vevey, Switzerland, until her parents' divorce in the mid-1990s.

In 2018, Kiera created the Chaplin Awards in Asia. It is an award that goes to an actor or filmmaker whose work embodies Charlie Chaplin's qualities of realism, diversity and courage within their craft. So far, recipients have been Tony Leung Chiu Wai and Zhang Yimou. The winner of the Chaplin Asia Award 2023 was Ge You.

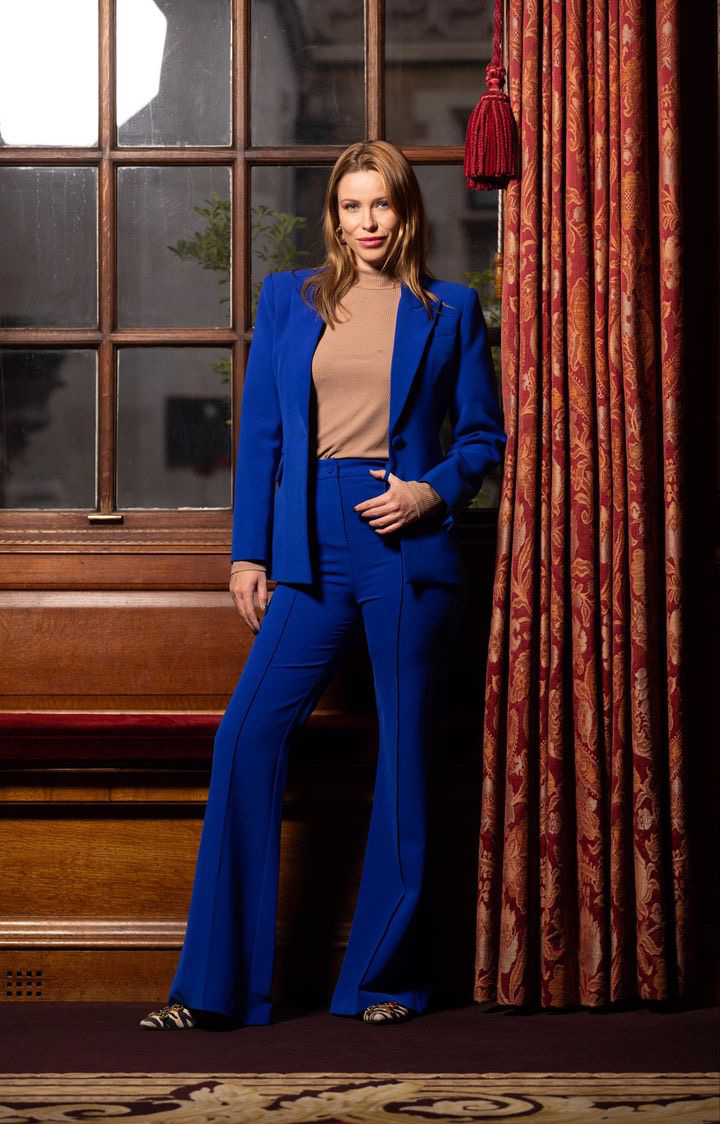
Chaplin in 2024

In 2018, Kiera, along with Jazmin Grimaldi were among the first participants to take part in The Rally Aicha des Gazelles in Morocco in an electric car to promote sustainability.

Since March 2019, she has been president of the Fondation Fleur du Désert in Paris, founded by human rights activist, model and bestselling author Waris Dirie. On 10 January 2020, Chaplin opened the first Kiera Chaplin Desert Flower School for 400 children in Sierra Leone (West Africa).

== Career ==
At age 16, Kiera moved to Paris, where she was signed by the modelling agency NEXT Model Management. At age 17, she moved to New York, two years later to Los Angeles, and back to New York in 2006.

Kiera first gained attention through her modeling career in New York as a teenager, where she appeared in the pages of high fashion magazines such as Vogue, Vanity Fair and InStyle. She has graced the covers of Town and Country, Elle, Harper's Bazaar and has been in various ad campaigns such as United Colors of Benetton, Tommy Hilfiger, Asprey, Hogan by Karl Lagerfeld, and Armani Exchange. She spent her teenage years working as a model and being photographed by the then most prestigious names in fashion photography, such as Mario Testino, Bruce Weber, Herb Ritts, and Terry Richardson. In 2002, Kiera also appeared in the Pirelli Calendar, shot by photographer Peter Lindbergh.

In 2010, Kiera was awarded a "Lifestyle Icon" award by the Vienna Awards for Fashion and Lifestyle. But Kiera also became involved as a designer when she designed her own sneakers in 2013, in a collaboration with the Italian brand Hogan.

Chaplin had a 30% stake in the Hollywood-based film company Limelight Productions, named after her grandfather's last American film, and she has appeared in supporting roles in films such as The Importance of Being Earnest (2002), the Bollywood productions Yatna (2005) and Chaurahen (2012), the biopic Sister Aimee: The Aimee Semple McPherson Story (2006), the Peter Fonda film Japan (2008), and the Italian comedic drama Interno Giorno by Tommaso Rossellini (2011), in which she had a prominent role in both French and English. She was also a judge in the 2019 series of Project Runway All Stars.

Kiera has been voted 17th "most eligible woman in the world" by FHM magazine in the US, as well as being voted the seventh sexiest woman in the world by GQ magazine.

In the summer of 2020, Kiera released her first single "Not Easy But Crazy" after a duet with Italian singer Simone Tomassini for his hit single "Charlot".

Kiera is a member and shareholder of the leading cosmetics and fashion brand, Bufarma. Chaplin endorses natural ingredients and superior quality. The brand also emphasizes sustainability and ethical practices, through the development of innovative products.

Kiera founded SybaBliss: an online fashion retail boutique for diverse young women. She provides fashion for women to express themselves through their clothing.

In 2023, Kiera founded the Golden Cane Prize, which was later awarded to Vachirawit Chivaaree.

== Filmography ==
=== Film ===
Year	Title	Role	Notes
2002	The Importance of Being Earnest	Girl in Gambling Club	Comedy Drama Romance
2002	The Year That Trembled	Jennifer Treman	Drama Romance War
2003	Profesionalac	Production	Comedy Drama
2006	Aimee Semple McPherson	Myrtle Ste. Pierre	Biography Drama
2008	Japan	Waitress	Action Crime Drama
2011	Interno giorno	Maila	Drama
2013	Richard Rossi 5th Anniversary of Sister Aimee	Myrtle Ste. Pierre	Drama
2018	Sister Aimee 10th Anniversary	Myrtle Ste. Pierre	Drama
2020	Inmortal	Kiera 2.0	Short

=== Television ===
Year	Title	Role	Notes
2004	Skavengers	Executive producer	TV Movie

== Ancestry ==
Ancestors of Kiera Chaplin

16. Spencer Chaplin
8. Charles Chaplin Sr
17. Ellen Elizabeth Smith
4. Charlie Chaplin
18. Charles Frederick Hill
9. Hannah Harriet Pedlingham Hill
19. Mary Ann
2. Eugene Chaplin
20. James O'Neill
10. Eugene O'Neill
21. Ella Quinlan
5. Oona O'Neill
22. Edward William Boulton
11. Agnes Boulton
23. Cecil Maud Williams
1. Kiera Chaplin
3. Bernadette McCready

== Award ==
Year	Award	Category	Result
2010	Vienna Awards for Fashion and Lifestyle	Lifestyle Icon	Winner
2023	WIBA	Global Influencer	Winner
