= Institute of Management Technology, Dubai =

Business school in Dubai

Coordinates: 25.12359°N 55.41533°E

IMT Business School
- Motto: Nurturing #NextGenLeaders
- Type: Education and Research Institution
- Established: 2006
- Director: Dr. Amit Sareen
- Academic staff: ~ 42 (Core) & ~ 9 (Visiting)
- Administrative staff: 36
- Students: 600+
- Location: Dubai, Dubai, United Arab Emirates
- Campus: Residential
- Website: http://www.imt.ac.ae

The Institute of Management Technology-Dubai (IMTD) is an international business school. It is certified by the Ministry of Higher Education, UAE; the institute is licensed by MOHESR and KHDA, and all its programs are accredited by the CAA.

It offers accredited undergraduate and postgraduate programs to students from a multitude of nationalities and educational backgrounds. Established in 2006, the institute was among the first International Business Schools to have set up a full-fledged campus in Dubai.

At the undergraduate level IMTD offers a Bachelor of Science in Business Administration (full-time). At the graduate level it offers a full-time MBA for fresh graduates and an Executive MBA (on weekends) for working professionals. Students from various nationalities including the Middle East, India, Southeast Asia, and Europe study together.

The Dubai campus is the third campus of IMT.

== Memberships ==
IMTD is a member of various international organizations such as:

- Brussels based European Foundation for Management Development (EFMD), which is the umbrella organization for leading European business schools in charge of EQUIS accreditation
- The Association to Advance Collegiate Schools of Business (AACSB International), the most reputed international body which accredits schools of business. It is regarded as the benchmark for business school quality among the academic community.
- Supply Chain & Logistics Group SCLG
- Dubai Quality Group
- International Chamber of Commerce

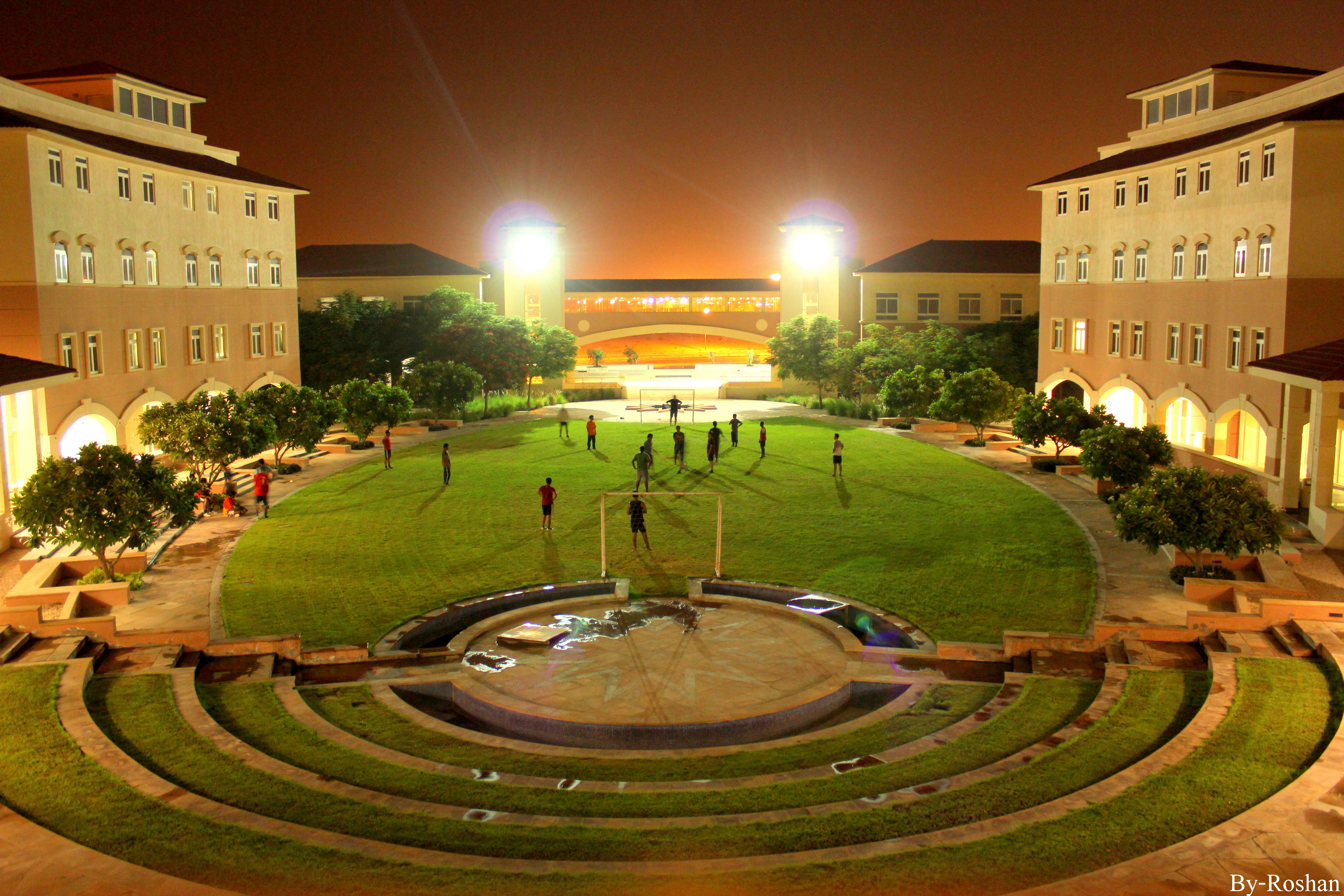
Night view of institute's campus.
