= Kanishk Seth (cricketer) =

Indian cricketer (born 1997)

Personal information
- Born: 4 November 1997 (age 29); Kolkata, West Bengal, India
- Batting: Right-handed
- Bowling: Left-arm medium
- Role: All-rounder

Domestic team information
- Years: Team
- 2015–2018: Bengal
- 2020/21–2023: Railways
- 2024/25–present: Bengal

Career statistics
Competition	FC	LA	T20
Matches	3	17	28
Runs scored	82	117	53
Batting average	41.00	10.63	8.83
100s/50s	0/0	0/0	0/0
Top score	32*	32	22*
Balls bowled	528	828	574
Wickets	7	23	33
Bowling average	41.57	34.56	23.03
5 wickets in innings	0	0	0
10 wickets in match	0	0	0
Best bowling	3/77	4/59	3/23
Catches/stumpings	2/–	4/–	13/–
- Source: ESPNcricinfo, 27 April 2025

Kanishk Seth (born 4 November 1997) is an Indian cricketer. He plays Twenty20 cricket for Railways. He made his List A debut for Bengal in the 2016–17 Vijay Hazare Trophy on 28 February 2017. He made his first-class debut for Bengal in the 2017–18 Ranji Trophy on 6 October 2017. In January 2018, he was bought by the Chennai Super Kings in the 2018 IPL auction.

== See also ==
- List of Bengal cricketers
