= List of awards and nominations received by Rajkumar Hirani =

Rajkumar Hirani awards and nominations
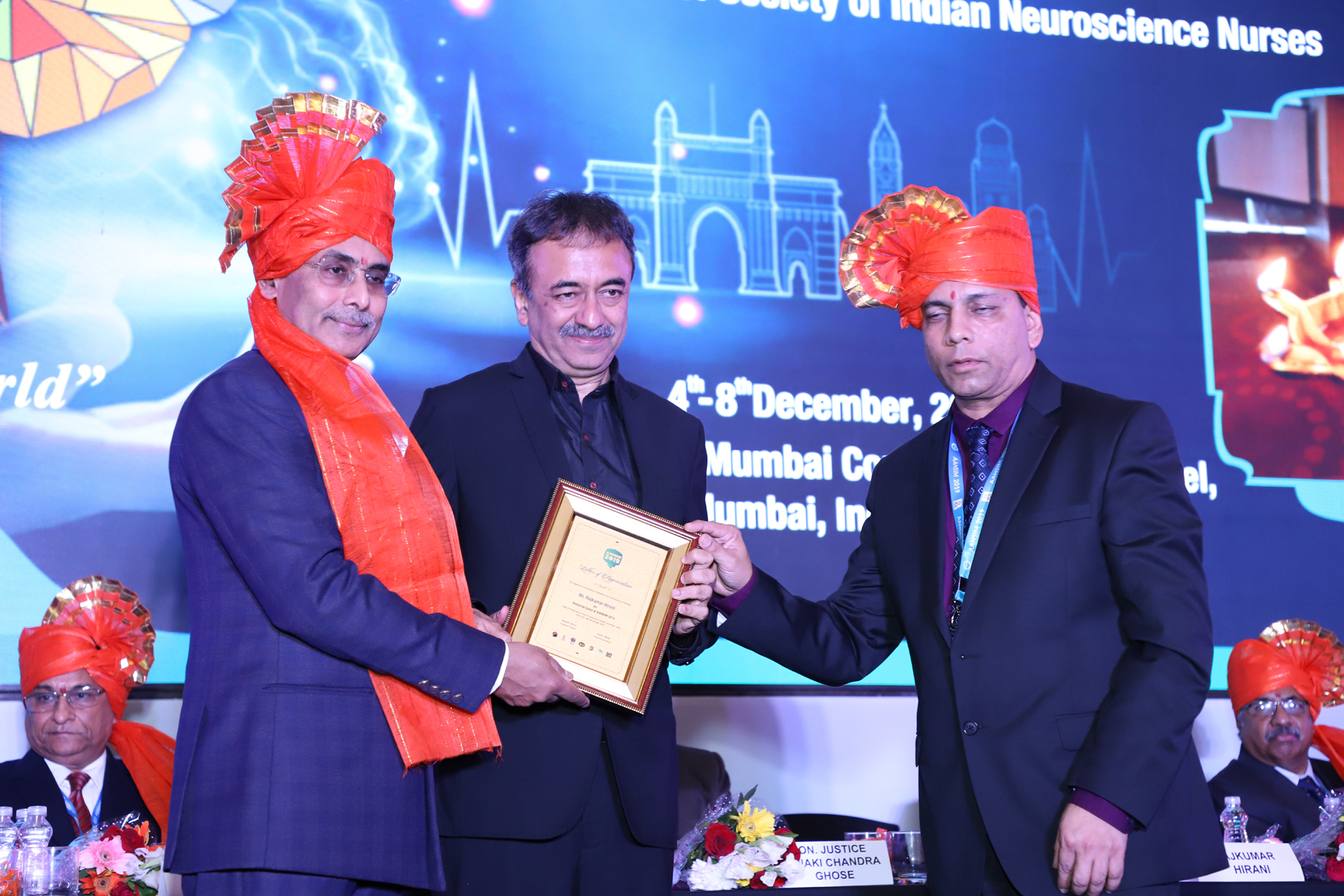
- Hirani being felicitated at a neurosurgeons' conference in 2019
Awards and nominations
| Award | Wins | Nominations |
| National Film Awards | 4 | 0 |
| Filmfare Awards | 11 | 0 |
| Producers Guild Film Awards | 4 | 0 |
| IIFA Awards | 12 | 0 |
| Bollywood Movie Awards | 4 | 0 |
| Zee Cine Awards | 6 | 0 |
| Star Screen Awards | 8 | 0 |
| Global Indian Film Awards | 3 | 0 |
| Stardust Awards | 1 | 0 |
| Others | 11 | 0 |

Totals (Note: Certain award groups do not simply award one winner. They acknowledge several different recipients, have runners-up, and have third place. Since this is a specific recognition and is different from losing an award, runner-up mentions are considered wins in this award tally. For simplification and to avoid errors, each award in this list has been presumed to have had a prior nomination.)
- Wins: 70

Rajkumar Hirani (born 20 November 1962) is an Indian film director and editor. Hirani is known for directing the Hindi films Munna Bhai M.B.B.S (2003), Lage Raho Munnabhai (2006), 3 Idiots (2009), PK (2014) and Sanju (2018). All of his films have been huge commercial and critical successes. Most have won several awards, including the national awards. He has won 11 Filmfare Awards. He is the founder of production house Rajkumar Hirani Films. He was honoured with the National Kishore Kumar Award for the year 2023 at in Khandwa, Madhya Pradesh by the Madhya Pradesh Government’s Department of Culture, India.

== National Film Awards ==
| Year | Category | Movie | Result |
|---|---|---|---|
| 2003 (51st) | Best Popular Film Providing Wholesome Entertainment | Munnabhai MBBS | Won |
| 2006 (54th) | Best Popular Film Providing Wholesome Entertainment | Lage Raho Munnabhai | Won |
| 2006 (54th) | Best Screenplay | Lage Raho Munnabhai | Won |
| 2009 (57th) | Best Popular Film Providing Wholesome Entertainment | 3 Idiots | Won |

== Filmfare Awards ==
Hirani's all directorial features have been nominated for Filmfare Award for Best Film and Best Director for him so far, making him the only director to do so. Also his all films are nominated for Best screenplay barring Sanju.

| Year | Category | Movie | Result |
|---|---|---|---|
| 2004 (49th) | Best Film (Critics) | Munnabhai MBBS | Won |
| 2004 (49th) | Best Director | Munnabhai MBBS | Nominated |
| 2004 (49th) | Best Screenplay | Munnabhai MBBS | Won |
| 2007 (52nd) | Best Film (Critics) | Lage Raho Munnabhai | Won |
| 2007 (52nd) | Best Director | Lage Raho Munnabhai | Nominated |
| 2007 (52nd) | Best Story | Lage Raho Munnabhai | Won |
| 2007 (52nd) | Best Dialogue | Lage Raho Munnabhai | Won |
| 2007 (52nd) | Best Editing | Lage Raho Munnabhai | Nominated |
| 2010 (55th) | Best Director | 3 Idiots | Won |
| 2010 (55th) | Best Story | 3 Idiots | Won |
| 2010 (55th) | Best Screenplay | 3 Idiots | Won |
| 2010 (55th) | Best Dialogue | 3 Idiots | Won |
| 2015 (60th) | Best Film | PK | Nominated |
| 2015 (60th) | Best Director | PK | Nominated |
| 2015 (60th) | Best Screenplay | PK | Won |
| 2015 (60th) | Best Story | PK | Nominated |
| 2015 (60th) | Best Dialogue | PK | Won |
| 2019 (64th) | Best Film | Sanju | Nominated |
| 2019 (64th) | Best Director | Sanju | Nominated |

== Screen Awards ==
| Year | Category | Movie | Result |
|---|---|---|---|
| 2007 | Best Story | Lage Raho Munnabhai | Won |
| 2007 | Best Dialogue | Lage Raho Munnabhai | Won |
| 2007 | Best Editing | Lage Raho Munnabhai | Won |
| 2010 | Best Director | 3 Idiots | Won |
| 2010 | Best Screenplay | 3 Idiots | Won |
| 2010 | Best Dialogue | 3 Idiots | Won |
| 2010 | Best Editing | 3 Idiots | Won |
| 2015 | Best Dialogue | PK | Won |

== IIFA Awards ==
| Year | Category | Movie | Result |
|---|---|---|---|
| 2004 (5th) | Best Screenplay | Munnabhai MBBS | Won |
| 2004 (5th) | Best Editing | Munnabhai MBBS | Won |
| 2007 (8th) | Best Director | Lage Raho Munnabhai | Won |
| 2007 (8th) | Best Story | Lage Raho Munnabhai | Won |
| 2007 (8th) | Best Dialogue | Lage Raho Munnabhai | Won |
| 2010 (11th) | Best Director | 3 Idiots | Won |
| 2010 (11th) | Best Story | 3 Idiots | Won |
| 2010 (11th) | Best Screenplay | 3 Idiots | Won |
| 2010 (11th) | Best Editing | 3 Idiots | Won |
| 2015 (16th) | Best Director | PK | Won |
| 2015 (16th) | Best Dialogue | PK | Won |
| 2019 (20th) | Best Director in 2 decades | 3 Idiots | Won |

== Apsara Awards ==
| Year | Category | Movie | Result |
|---|---|---|---|
| 2004 | Best Debut Director | Munnabhai MBBS | Won |
| 2004 | Best Screenplay | Munnabhai MBBS | Won |
| 2004 | Best Editing | Munnabhai MBBS | Won |
| 2011 | Best Director of 2009 (Special Honour) | 3 Idiots | Won |
| 2015 | Best Film | PK | Won |
| 2015 | Best Director | PK | Won |
| 2015 | Best Dialogue | PK | Won |

== Zee Cine Awards ==
| Year | Category | Movie | Result |
|---|---|---|---|
| 2004 | Most Promising Director | Munnabhai MBBS | Won |
| 2004 | Best Editing | Munnabhai MBBS | Won |
| 2007 | Best Story | Lage Raho Munnabhai | Won |
| 2007 | Best Screenplay | Lage Raho Munnabhai | Won |
| 2007 | Best Dialogue | Lage Raho Munnabhai | Won |
| 2007 | Zenith Power Team Award | Lage Raho Munnabhai | Won |
| 2019 | Best Film | Sanju | Won |

== Bollywood Movie Awards ==
| Year | Category | Movie | Result |
|---|---|---|---|
| 2004 | Best Director | Munnabhai MBBS | Won |
| 2007 | Best Director | Lage Raho Munnabhai | Won |
| 2007 | Best Story | Lage Raho Munnabhai | Won |
| 2007 | Best Dialogue | Lage Raho Munnabhai | Won |

== Stardust Awards ==
| Year | Category | Movie | Result |
|---|---|---|---|
| 2007 | Best Director | Lage Raho Munnabhai | Won |

== Global Indian Film Awards ==
| Year | Category | Movie | Result |
|---|---|---|---|
| 2007 | Best Story | Lage Raho Munnabhai | Won |
| 2007 | Best Dialogue | Lage Raho Munnabhai | Won |

== ETC Bollywood Business Awards ==
| Year | Category | Movie | Result |
|---|---|---|---|
| 2014 | Highest Grossing Director | PK | Won |
| 2014 | Top Grosser of the Year | PK | Won |
| 2014 | Box office Record breaker of the Year | PK | Won |
| 2014 | Box office 300 cr club | PK | Won |
| 2018 | Top Grosser of the Year | Sanju | Won |
| 2018 | Box office 300 cr club | Sanju | Won |

== Indian Film Festival of Melbourne ==
| Year | Category | Movie | Result |
|---|---|---|---|
| 2015 | Telstra People's Choice Award | PK | Won |
| 2018 | Best Film | Sanju | Won |
| 2018 | Best Director | Sanju | Won |

== CNN-IBN Indian of the Year ==
| Year | Category | Movie | Result |
|---|---|---|---|
| 2006 | Entertainment | Lage Raho Munnabhai | Won |

== See also ==
- List of accolades received by Lage Raho Munna Bhai
- List of accolades received by 3 Idiots
