= List of accolades received by 3 Idiots =

3 Idiots awards and nominations
Awards and nominations
Award	Wins	Nominations
55th Filmfare Awards	6	14
57th National Film Awards	3	3
Stardust Awards	3	6
11th IIFA Awards	16	22
20th IIFA Awards	1	1
Apsara Awards	2	2
Screen Awards	10	13
Global Indian Music Academy Awards	5	5
Bollywood Hungama Surfers Choice Movie Awards	7	7
Beijing International Film Festival	1	1
Japan Academy Prize	0	1
Videoyasan Awards	1	1
Other awards	5	5

Totals (Note: Certain award groups do not simply award one winner. They acknowledge several different recipients, have runners-up, and have third place. Since this is a specific recognition and is different from losing an award, runner-up mentions are considered wins in this award tally. For simplification and to avoid errors, each award in this list has been presumed to have had a prior nomination.)
- Wins: 60
- Nominations: 81

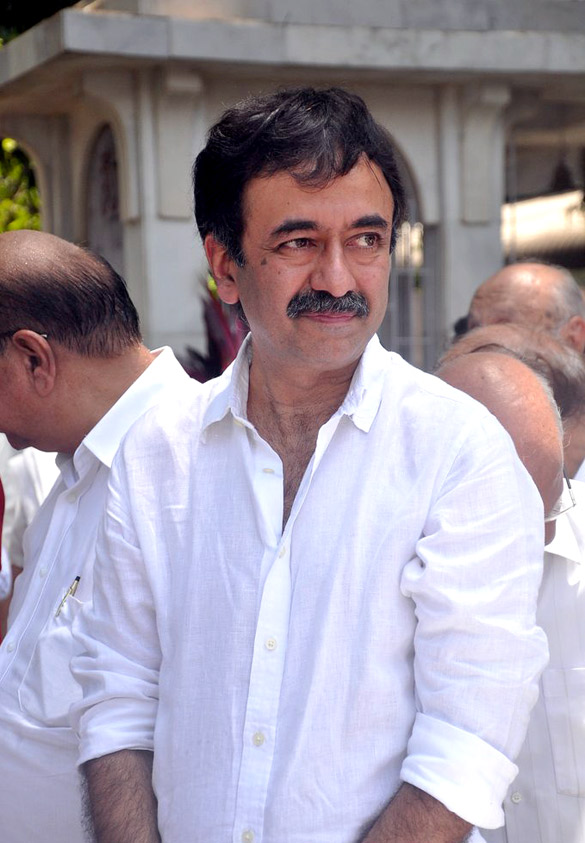
Rajkumar Hirani, director

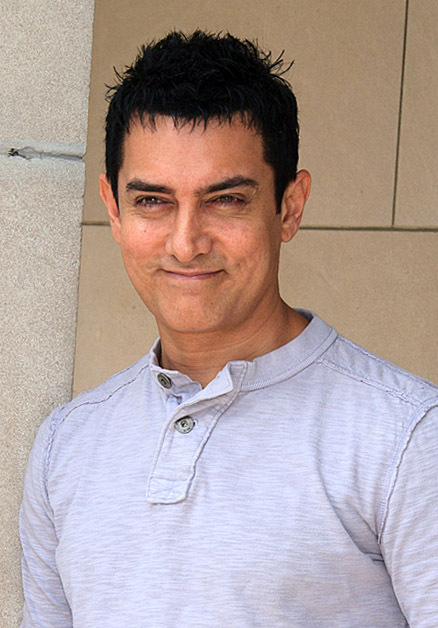
Rajkumar Hirani's direction and Aamir Khan's (above) acting garnered several awards and nominations for this film.

3 Idiots is an Indian Hindi-language coming-of-age comedy-drama film co-written (with Abhijat Joshi) and directed by Rajkumar Hirani. The film is based on novel Five Point Someone by Chetan Bhagat, it follows the friendship of three students at an Indian engineering college and is a satire about the social pressures under an Indian education system. The film stars Aamir Khan, Madhavan, Sharman Joshi, Kareena Kapoor Khan, Boman Irani and Omi Vaidya in lead roles. 3 Idiots has been remade in Tamil entitled Nanban (2012) and Spanish-language Mexican remake named 3 idiotas (2017).

3 Idiots garnered awards and nominations in a variety of categories with particular praise for its direction, screenplay, the cast's performances, cinematography, and musical score. Rotten Tomatoes, a review aggregator, surveyed 13 reviews and judged 100% to be positive, with an average rating of 7.44/10. At the 55th Filmfare Awards, the film received eleven nominations including Best Film, Best Director for Hirani, and went on to win six awards: Best Film, Best Director, Best Dialogue, Best Screenplay, and Best Supporting Actor. At the 11th IIFA Awards, the film garnered twenty-three nominations and went on to win seventeen awards: Best Film, Best Director and Best Editing for Hirani, Best Performance in a Leading Role (Female) for Kareena Kapoor, Best Performance in a Supporting Role (Male) for Sharman Joshi, Best Performance in a Negative Role for Boman Irani, Best Male Debut for Omi Vaidya.

3 Idiots won the National Film Award for Best Popular Film Providing Wholesome Entertainment, the National Film Award for Best Lyrics, and the National Film Award for Best Audiography at the 57th National Film Awards. At the 37th Japan Academy Film Prize, the film was nominated for the Outstanding Foreign Language Film. At the 1st Global Indian Music Academy Awards, 3 Idiots won the GiMA Award for Best Engineer – Theatre Mix, GiMA Award for Best Music Debut, GiMA Award for Best Male Playback Singer, and the GiMA Award for Best Lyricist.

== Accolades ==
Award	Year of ceremony	Category	Recipients	Result	Ref(s)
Beijing International Film Festival	2011	Best Foreign Film	3 Idiots	Nominated	
Filmfare Awards	2010	Best Film	Vidhu Vinod Chopra	Won	
Filmfare Awards	2010	Best Director	Rajkumar Hirani	Won	
Filmfare Awards	2010	Best Dialogue	Abhijat Joshi, Rajkumar Hirani	Won	
Filmfare Awards	2010	Best Story	Abhijat Joshi, Rajkumar Hirani	Won	
Filmfare Awards	2010	Best Screenplay	Abhijat Joshi, Rajkumar Hirani, Vidhu Vinod Chopra	Won	
Filmfare Awards	2010	Best Supporting Actor	Boman Irani	Won	
Filmfare Awards	2010	Best Supporting Actor	R. Madhavan	Nominated	
Filmfare Awards	2010	Best Supporting Actor	Sharman Joshi	Nominated	
Filmfare Awards	2010	Best Actor	Aamir Khan	Nominated	
Filmfare Awards	2010	Best Actress	Kareena Kapoor	Nominated	
Filmfare Awards	2010	Best Playback Singer – Female	Shreya Ghoshal for "Zoobi Doobi"	Nominated	
Global Indian Music Academy Awards	2010	Best Film Album	Shantanu Moitra	Won	
Global Indian Music Academy Awards	2010	Most Popular Song	"All Izz Well'	Won	
Global Indian Music Academy Awards	2010	Best Lyricist	Swanand Kirkire for "Behti Hawa Sa Tha Woh"	Won	
Global Indian Music Academy Awards	2010	Best Male Playback Singer	Shaan, Shantanu Moitra for "Behti Hawa Sa Tha Woh"	Won	
Global Indian Music Academy Awards	2010	Best Engineer	Bishwadeep Chatterjee and Anup Dev	Won	
Ghanta Awards	2011	Worst Song	"All Izz Well"	Won	
International Indian Film Academy Awards	2010	Best Film	Vidhu Vinod Chopra	Won	
International Indian Film Academy Awards	2010	Best Director	Rajkumar Hirani	Won	
International Indian Film Academy Awards	2010	Best Editing	Rajkumar Hirani	Won	
International Indian Film Academy Awards	2010	Best Actress	Kareena Kapoor	Won	
International Indian Film Academy Awards	2010	Best Supporting Actor	Sharman Joshi	Won	
International Indian Film Academy Awards	2010	Best Supporting Actor	R. Madhavan	Nominated	
International Indian Film Academy Awards	2010	Best Performance in a Negative Role	Boman Irani	Won	
International Indian Film Academy Awards	2010	Best Male Debut	Omi Vaidya	Won	
International Indian Film Academy Awards	2010	Best Performance in a Comic Role	Omi Vaidya	Nominated	
International Indian Film Academy Awards	2010	Best Lyricist	Swanand Kirkire for "Behti Hawa Sa Tha Woh"	Won	
International Indian Film Academy Awards	2010	Best Male Playback Singer	Shaan for "Behti Hawa Sa Tha Woh"	Won	
International Indian Film Academy Awards	2010	Best Male Playback Singer	Sonu Nigam for "All Izz Well"	Nominated	
International Indian Film Academy Awards	2010	Best Background Score	Sanjay Wanderkar, Atul Raninga, Shantanu Moitra	Won	
International Indian Film Academy Awards	2010	Best Story	Abhijat Joshi, Rajkumar Hirani, Vidhu Vinod Chopra	Won	
International Indian Film Academy Awards	2010	Best Screenplay	Abhijat Joshi, Rajkumar Hirani, Vidhu Vinod Chopra	Won	
International Indian Film Academy Awards	2010	Best Dialogue	Abhijat Joshi, Rajkumar Hirani	Won	
International Indian Film Academy Awards	2010	Best Cinematography	C. K. Muraleedharan	Won	
International Indian Film Academy Awards	2010	Best Sound Recording	Bishwadeep Chatterjee and Nihal Ranjan Samel	Won	
International Indian Film Academy Awards	2010	Best Sound Re-Recording	Anup Dev	Won	
International Indian Film Academy Awards	2010	Best Actor	Aamir Khan	Nominated	
International Indian Film Academy Awards	2010	Best Music Director	Shantanu Moitra	Nominated	
International Indian Film Academy Awards	2010	Best Female Playback Singer	Shreya Ghoshal for "Zoobi Doobi"	Nominated	
Japan Academy Prize	2014	Best Outstanding Foreign Language Film	3 Idiots	Nominated	
National Film Awards	2010	Best Popular Film Providing Wholesome Entertainment	Rajkumar Hirani, Vidhu Vinod Chopra	Won	
National Film Awards	2010	Best Lyrics	Swanand Kirkire for "Behti Hawa Sa Tha Woh"	Won	
National Film Awards	2010	Best Audiography	Anup Dev	Won	
Producers Guild Film Awards	2011	Best Film	Vidhu Vinod Chopra	Won	
Producers Guild Film Awards	2011	Best Director	Rajkumar Hirani	Won	
Stardust Awards	2010	Film of the Year – Drama	Vidhu Vinod Chopra	Won	
Stardust Awards	2010	Star of the Year – Female	Kareena Kapoor (also for Kurbaan)	Won	
Videoyasan Awards	2014	Grand Prize	3 Idiots	Won	
