= List of accolades received by Lage Raho Munna Bhai =

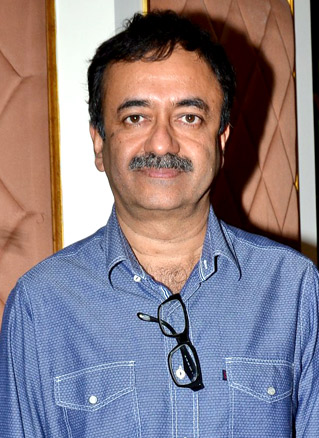
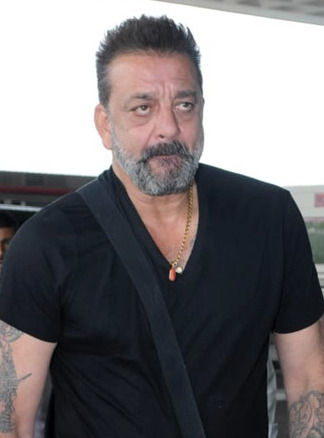
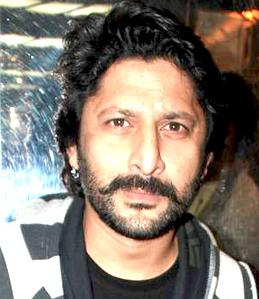
- Hirani's writing and direction, Dutt and Warsi's performances in Lage Raho Munna Bhai garnered them several awards and nominations respectively.
Accolades
Award	Wins	Nominations
Bollywood Movie Awards	4	7
Filmfare Awards	4	12
Global Indian Film Awards	3	8
International Indian Film Academy Awards	3	10
National Film Awards	4	4
Screen Awards	6	10
Stardust Awards	2	6
Zee Cine Awards	6	13

Totals (Note: Certain award groups do not simply award one winner. They acknowledge several different recipients, have runners-up, and have third place. Since this is a specific recognition and is different from losing an award, runner-up mentions are considered wins in this award tally. For simplification and to avoid errors, each award in this list has been presumed to have had a prior nomination.)
- Wins: 32
- Nominations: 70

Lage Raho Munna Bhai (pronounced [ləˈɡeː rəˈɦoː mʊnnaːˈbʱaːi]; English: Carry on Munna Bhai) is a 2006 Indian musical comedy directed by Rajkumar Hirani and produced by Vidhu Vinod Chopra. It stars Sanjay Dutt as Munna Bhai, a Mumbai (Bombay) underworld don, who begins to see the spirit of Mahatma Gandhi. Through his interactions with the image of Gandhi, Munna Bhai begins to practice what he calls Gandhigiri (Satyagraha, non-violence, and truth) to help ordinary people solve their problems. His sidekick, Circuit, is portrayed by Arshad Warsi.

Lage Raho Munna Bhai is the recipient of four National Film Awards in addition to other awards. Some speculated that it would represent India as an entry for the 2007 Academy Award for Best Foreign Film. Although ultimately losing to Rang De Basanti as India's official submission, the film's producers submitted it as an independent entry. However, neither film received an Oscar nomination.

== Awards and nominations ==
Award (Note: Awards, festivals and organizations are in alphabetical order.)	Date of ceremony (Note: Date is linked to the article about the awards held that year, wherever possible.)	Category	Recipient(s)	Result	Ref.
Bollywood Movie Awards	26 May 2007	Best Film	Lage Raho Munna Bhai – Vidhu Vinod Chopra	Won	
Bollywood Movie Awards	26 May 2007	Best Director	Rajkumar Hirani	Won	
Bollywood Movie Awards	26 May 2007	Best Dialogue	Rajkumar Hirani	Won	
Bollywood Movie Awards	26 May 2007	Best Story	Rajkumar Hirani, Abhijat Joshi	Won	
Bollywood Movie Awards	26 May 2007	Best Actor	Sanjay Dutt	Nominated	
Bollywood Movie Awards	26 May 2007	Best Supporting Actor	Arshad Warsi	Nominated	
Bollywood Movie Awards	26 May 2007	Best Comedian	Arshad Warsi	Nominated	
Filmfare Awards	17 February 2007	Best Film	Lage Raho Munna Bhai – Vidhu Vinod Chopra	Nominated	
Filmfare Awards	17 February 2007	Best Film (Critics)	Lage Raho Munna Bhai – Rajkumar Hirani	Won	
Filmfare Awards	17 February 2007	Best Director	Rajkumar Hirani	Nominated	
Filmfare Awards	17 February 2007	Best Actor	Sanjay Dutt	Nominated	
Filmfare Awards	17 February 2007	Best Performance in a Negative Role	Boman Irani	Nominated	
Filmfare Awards	17 February 2007	Best Performance in a Comic Role	Arshad Warsi	Won	
Filmfare Awards	17 February 2007	Best Female Playback Singer	Shreya Ghoshal – (for "Pal Pal Har Pal")	Nominated	
Filmfare Awards	17 February 2007	Best Story	Rajkumar Hirani, Vidhu Vinod Chopra	Won	
Filmfare Awards	17 February 2007	Best Dialogue	Rajkumar Hirani, Vidhu Vinod Chopra	Won	
Filmfare Awards	17 February 2007	Best Screenplay	Abhijat Joshi, Rajkumar Hirani, Vidhu Vinod Chopra	Nominated	
Filmfare Awards	17 February 2007	Best Editing	Rajkumar Hirani	Nominated	
Filmfare Awards	17 February 2007	Best Choreography	Ganesh Acharya for "Samjho Ho Hi Gaya"	Nominated	
Global Indian Film Awards	7–9 December 2006	Best Film	Lage Raho Munna Bhai – Vidhu Vinod Chopra	Won	
Global Indian Film Awards	7–9 December 2006	Best Director	Rajkumar Hirani	Nominated	
Global Indian Film Awards	7–9 December 2006	Best Actor	Sanjay Dutt	Nominated	
Global Indian Film Awards	7–9 December 2006	Best Actor in A Supporting Role	Arshad Warsi	Nominated	
Global Indian Film Awards	7–9 December 2006	Best Actor in A Comic Role	Boman Irani	Nominated	
Global Indian Film Awards	7–9 December 2006	Best Female Playback Singer	Shreya Ghoshal for "Pal Pal Har Pal"	Nominated	
Global Indian Film Awards	7–9 December 2006	Best Story	Rajkumar Hirani, Vidhu Vinod Chopra	Won	
Global Indian Film Awards	7–9 December 2006	Best Dialogue	Abhijat Joshi, Rajkumar Hirani	Won	
International Indian Film Academy Awards	7–9 June 2007	Best Film	Lage Raho Munna Bhai – Vidhu Vinod Chopra	Nominated	
International Indian Film Academy Awards	7–9 June 2007	Best Director	Rajkumar Hirani	Won	
International Indian Film Academy Awards	7–9 June 2007	Best Story	Rajkumar Hirani	Won	
International Indian Film Academy Awards	7–9 June 2007	Best Screenplay	Abhijat Joshi, Rajkumar Hirani, Vidhu Vinod Chopra	Nominated	
International Indian Film Academy Awards	7–9 June 2007	Best Dialogue	Abhijat Joshi, Rajkumar Hirani	Won	
International Indian Film Academy Awards	7–9 June 2007	Best Actor	Sanjay Dutt	Nominated	
International Indian Film Academy Awards	7–9 June 2007	Best Actress	Vidya Balan	Nominated	
International Indian Film Academy Awards	7–9 June 2007	Best Supporting Actor	Arshad Warsi	Won	
International Indian Film Academy Awards	7–9 June 2007	Best Performance in a Negative Role	Boman Irani	Nominated	
International Indian Film Academy Awards	7–9 June 2007	Best Female Playback Singer	Shreya Ghoshal for "Pal Pal Har Pal"	Nominated	
National Film Awards	2 September 2008	Best Popular Film Providing Wholesome Entertainment	Producer: Vidhu Vinod Chopra; Director: Rajkumar Hirani	Won	
National Film Awards	2 September 2008	Best Screenplay	Abhijat Joshi, Rajkumar Hirani, Vidhu Vinod Chopra	Won	
National Film Awards	2 September 2008	Best Supporting Actor	Dilip Prabhavalkar	Won	
National Film Awards	2 September 2008	Best Lyricist	Swanand Kirkire for "Bande Mein Tha Dum"	Won	
Screen Awards	6 January 2007	Best Film	Lage Raho Munna Bhai – Vidhu Vinod Chopra	Won	
Screen Awards	6 January 2007	Best Director	Rajkumar Hirani	Nominated	
Screen Awards	6 January 2007	Best Editing	Rajkumar Hirani	Won	
Screen Awards	6 January 2007	Best Story	Abhijat Joshi, Rajkumar Hirani	Won	
Screen Awards	6 January 2007	Best Screenplay	Abhijat Joshi, Rajkumar Hirani	Nominated	
Screen Awards	6 January 2007	Best Dialogue	Abhijat Joshi, Rajkumar Hirani	Won	
Screen Awards	6 January 2007	Best Actor	Sanjay Dutt	Nominated	
Screen Awards	6 January 2007	Best Actor (Critics)	Sanjay Dutt	Won	
Screen Awards	6 January 2007	Best Supporting Actor	Arshad Warsi	Won	
Screen Awards	6 January 2007	Best Lyricist	Swanand Kirkire for "Bande Mein Tha Dum"	Nominated	
Stardust Awards	18 February 2007	Dream Director	Rajkumar Hirani	Won	
Stardust Awards	18 February 2007	Star of the Year – Male	Sanjay Dutt	Won	
Stardust Awards	18 February 2007	Superstar of Tomorrow – Female	Vidya Balan	Nominated	
Stardust Awards	18 February 2007	Best Supporting Actor	Arshad Warsi	Nominated	
Stardust Awards	18 February 2007	Best Supporting Actor	Dilip Prabhavalkar	Nominated	
Stardust Awards	18 February 2007	Best Performance in a Negative Role	Boman Irani	Nominated	
Zee Cine Awards	1 April 2007	Best Film	Lage Raho Munna Bhai – Vidhu Vinod Chopra	Nominated	
Zee Cine Awards	1 April 2007	Best Director	Rajkumar Hirani	Nominated	
Zee Cine Awards	1 April 2007	Best Dialogue	Rajkumar Hirani	Nominated	
Zee Cine Awards	1 April 2007	Best Editing	Rajkumar Hirani	Won	
Zee Cine Awards	1 April 2007	Best Story	Abhijat Joshi, Rajkumar Hirani	Won	
Zee Cine Awards	1 April 2007	Best Screenplay	Abhijat Joshi, Rajkumar Hirani	Won	
Zee Cine Awards	1 April 2007	Best Actor – Male	Sanjay Dutt	Nominated	
Zee Cine Awards	1 April 2007	Best Actor (Critics) – Male	Sanjay Dutt	Won	
Zee Cine Awards	1 April 2007	Best Actor in a Comic Role	Arshad Warsi	Won	
Zee Cine Awards	1 April 2007	Best Lyricist	Swanand Kirkire for "Bande Mein Tha Dum"	Nominated	
Zee Cine Awards	1 April 2007	Best Song Recording	Bishwadeep Chatterjee, Sachin Sanghvi	Nominated	
Zee Cine Awards	1 April 2007	Best Film Processing	Adlabs Films	Nominated	
Zee Cine Awards	1 April 2007	Zenith Power Team Award	Lage Raho Munna Bhai	Won	
