= 5th IIFA Awards =

2004 Bollywood film award ceremony

- Date: 20 May 2004– 22 May 2004
- Site: Singapore Indoor Stadium; Esplanade Concert Hall, Singapore
- Hosted by: Rahul Khanna Celina Jaitly Mahima Chaudhry

Highlights
- Best Picture: Kal Ho Naa Ho
- Best Direction: Rakesh Roshan (Koi... Mil Gaya)
- Best Actor: Shah Rukh Khan (Kal Ho Naa Ho)
- Best Actress: Preity Zinta (Kal Ho Naa Ho)
- Most awards: Kal Ho Naa Ho (13)
- Most nominations: Kal Ho Naa Ho (17)

Television coverage
- Channel: Star Plus
- Network: STAR TV

The 2004 IIFA Awards, officially known as the 5th International Indian Film Academy Awards ceremony, presented by the International Indian Film Academy honored the best films of 2003 and took place between 20 and 22 May 2004. This year, the city of Singapore played host to the Indian Film Industry. The tag line of this year's IIFA Awards was Uniquely IIFA, Uniquely Singapore ....

The official ceremony took place on 22 May 2004, at the Singapore Indoor Stadium, in Esplanade Concert Hall, Singapore. During the ceremony, IIFA Awards were awarded in 27 competitive categories. The ceremony was televised in India and internationally on Sony TV. Actors Rahul Khanna hosted the ceremony.

Kal Ho Naa Ho led the ceremony with 12 nominations, followed by Munna Bhai M.B.B.S. with 9 nominations, Baghban and Koi... Mil Gaya with 8 nominations each, and Tere Naam with 7 nominations.

Kal Ho Naa Ho won 13 awards, including Best Film, Best Actress (for Preity Zinta), Best Supporting Actor (for Saif Ali Khan) and Best Supporting Actress (for Jaya Bachchan), thus becoming the most–awarded film at the ceremony.

Other multiple awards winners included Koi... Mil Gaya with 5 awards, Munna Bhai M.B.B.S. with 4 awards and Ishq Vishk with 2 awards.

In addition, movies receiving a single award included LOC Kargil (Best Sound Re–Recording), Jism (Best Female Playback Singer) and Janasheen (Best Villain).

Preity Zinta received dual nominations for Best Actress for her performances in Kal Ho Naa Ho and Koi... Mil Gaya, winning for the former, her first and only win in the category.

== Background ==
The awards began in 2000 and the first ceremony was held in London at The Millennium Dome. From then on the awards were held at locations around the world signifying the international success of Bollywood. The next award ceremony was announced to be held at Amsterdam Arena in Amsterdam, Netherlands in 2005.

Singapore also hosted the 2012 IIFA Awards.

== Winners and nominees ==
Winners are listed first and highlighted in boldface.

thumb

=== Popular awards ===
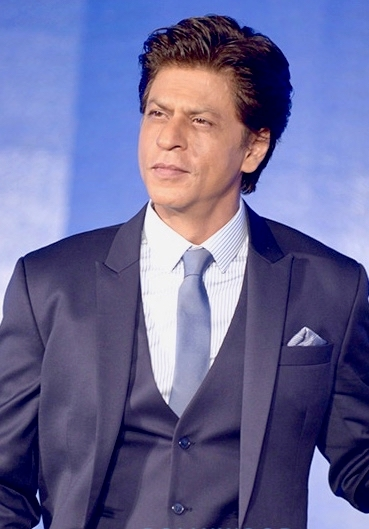
Shah Rukh Khan (Best Actor)

Best Film	Best Director
**Kal Ho Naa Ho – Dharma Productions**; Baghban – BR Films; Janasheen – FK Films; Koi... Mil Gaya – Filmkraft Productions (I) Pvt. Ltd.; Munna Bhai M.B.B.S. – Vinod Chopra Productions and Entertainment One; Tere Naam – MD Productions	**Rakesh Roshan – Koi... Mil Gaya**; Nikhil Advani – Kal Ho Naa Ho; Rajkumar Hirani – Munna Bhai M.B.B.S.; Ravi Chopra – Baghban; Satish Kaushik – Tere Naam
Best Performance In A Leading Role – Male	Best Performance In A Leading Role – Female
**Shah Rukh Khan – Kal Ho Naa Ho as Aman Mathur**; Amitabh Bachchan – Baghban as Raj Malhotra; Salman Khan – Tere Naam as Radhe Mohan; Sanjay Dutt – Munna Bhai M.B.B.S. as Murli Prasad Sharma (Munna Bhai); Hrithik Roshan – Koi... Mil Gaya as Rohit Mehra	**Preity Zinta – Kal Ho Naa Ho as Naina Catherine Kapur/ Patel**; Hema Malini – Baghban as Pooja Malhotra; Rani Mukerji – Chalte Chalte as Priya Chopra; Preity Zinta – Koi... Mil Gaya as Nisha; Urmila Matondkar – Bhoot as Swati
Best Performance In A Supporting Role – Male	Best Performance In A Supporting Role – Female
**Saif Ali Khan – Kal Ho Naa Ho as Rohit Patel**; Arshad Warsi – Munna Bhai M.B.B.S. as Sarkeshwar (Circuit); Ashutosh Rana – LOC Kargil as Yogender Singh, 18 Grenadiers; Suneil Shetty – Qayamat: City Under Threat as Akram sheikh; Yash Tonk – Janasheen as Max Periera	**Jaya Bachchan – Kal Ho Naa Ho as Jennifer Kapur**; Juhi Chawla – Jhankaar Beats as Shanti; Maya Alagh – LOC Kargil as Manoj Pandey's mother; Rekha – Koi... Mil Gaya as Sonia Mehra; Shoma Anand – Hungama as Anjali Tiwari
Best Performance In A Comic Role	Best Performance In A Negative Role
**Boman Irani – Munna Bhai M.B.B.S. as Dr. JC Asthana**; Paresh Rawal – Baghban as Hemant Patel; Paresh Rawal – Hungama as Radheysham Tiwari; Rajpal Yadav – Hungama as Raja; Rajpal Yadav – Kal Ho Naa Ho as Guru	**Feroz Khan – Janasheen as Saba Karim Shah**; Amrish Puri – The Hero: Love Story of a Spy as I.S.I Chief Ishak Khan; Atul Kulkarni – Dum as Inspector "Encounter" Shankar; Bipasha Basu – Jism as Sonia Khanna; Yashpal Sharma – Gangaajal as Sunder Yadav
Best Debut – Male	Best Debut – Female
**Shahid Kapoor – Ishq Vishk as Rajiv Mathur**	**Amrita Rao – Ishq Vishk as Payal**

=== Musical awards ===
Best Music Director	Best Lyrics
**Shankar–Ehsaan–Loy – Kal Ho Naa Ho**; Anu Malik – Munna Bhai M.B.B.S.; Himesh Reshammiya – Tere Naam; Rajesh Roshan – Koi... Mil Gaya; Vishal–Shekhar – Jhankaar Beats	**"Kal Ho Naa Ho" from Kal Ho Naa Ho – Javed Akhtar**; "Ek Saathi Aur Bhi Tha" from LOC Kargil – Javed Akhtar; "Dekhle Aankhon Mein Aankhien Daal" from Munna Bhai M.B.B.S. – Rahat Indori; "Kyun Kisi Ko" from Tere Naam – Sameer; "Main Yahan Tu Wahan" from Baghban – Sameer
Best Male Playback Singer	Best Female Playback Singer
**Sonu Nigam for "Kal Ho Naa Ho" – Kal Ho Naa Ho**; Amitabh Bachchan for "Main Yahan Tu Wahan" – Baghban; KK for "Tu Aashiqui Hai" – Jhankaar Beats; Udit Narayan for "Koi... Mil Gaya" – Koi... Mil Gaya; Udit Narayan for "Tere Naam" – Tere Naam	**Shreya Ghoshal for "Jaadu Hai Nasha Hai" – Jism**; Alka Yagnik for "Kal Ho Naa Ho – Sad Version" – Kal Ho Naa Ho; Alka Yagnik for "Seemaaye Bulaaye" – LOC Kargil; Alka Yagnik for "Oodhni" – Tere Naam; Sunidhi Chauhan for "Dekhle Aankhon Mein Aankhen Daal" – Munna Bhai M.B.B.S.
Best Song Recording	Best Background score
**Koi... Mil Gaya – Satish Gupta**	**Kal Ho Naa Ho – Shankar–Ehsaan–Loy**

=== Backstage awards ===
Best Story	Best Screenplay
**Kal Ho Naa Ho – Karan Johar**; Baghban – B.R. Chopra; LOC Kargil – J.P. Dutta; Munna Bhai M.B.B.S. – Rajkumar Hirani; Koi... Mil Gaya – Rakesh Roshan; Janasheen – Supran Verma, Siraz Ahmed and Feroz Khan	**Munna Bhai M.B.B.S. – Rajkumar Hirani, Lajan Joseph and Vidhu Vinod Chopra**
Best Dialogue
**Abbas Tyrewala for Munna Bhai M.B.B.S.**

=== Technical awards ===
Best Cinematographer	Best Choreography
**Kal Ho Naa Ho – Anil Mehta**	**Maahi Ve from Kal Ho Naa Ho – Farah Khan**
Best Costume Design	Best Editing
**Kal Ho Naa Ho – Manish Malhotra**	**Munna Bhai M.B.B.S. – Rajkumar Hirani**
Best Makeup	Best Sound Recording
**Kal Ho Naa Ho – Mickey Contractor**	**Koi... Mil Gaya – Jeetendra Chaudhary**
Best Sound Re–Recording	Best Special Effects
**LOC Kargil – Lesli – Anand Theatre**	**Koi... Mil Gaya – Bimmini Special Fx, Digital Art Media**

=== Special awards ===
==== Outstanding Contribution to Indian Cinema ====
- Yash Johar

==== Outstanding Achievement In Indian Cinema ====
- Dilip Kumar

==== Samsung Diva ====
- Kareena Kapoor

==== Samsung Style Icon ====
- Saif Ali Khan

==== Sony face of the year – Male ====
- Shahid Kapoor

==== Sony face of the year – Female ====
- Amrita Rao

== Superlatives ==
Films with multiple nominations
Nominations	Film
17	Kal Ho Naa Ho
9	Munna Bhai M.B.B.S.
8	Baghban
8	Koi... Mil Gaya
7	Tere Naam
5	LOC: Kargil
4	Janasheen
3	Hungama
3	Jhankaar Beats
2	Jism

Films with multiple awards
Awards	Film
15	Kal Ho Naa Ho
5	Koi... Mil Gaya
4	Munna Bhai M.B.B.S.
2	Ishq Vishk
