= 8th IIFA Awards =

Indian film award ceremony in 2007

- The official logo of the 2007 IIFA Awards
- Date: 7 June 2007– 9 June 2007
- Site: Hallam FM Arena; Sheffield, England
- Hosted by: Boman Irani; Lara Dutta

Highlights
- Best Picture: Rang De Basanti
- Best Direction: Rajkumar Hirani (Lage Raho Munna Bhai)
- Best Actor: Hrithik Roshan (Krrish)
- Best Actress: Rani Mukerji (Kabhi Alvida Naa Kehna)
- Most awards: Rang De Basanti (11)
- Most nominations: Rang De Basanti (21)

Television coverage
- Channel: Star Plus
- Network: STAR TV

The 2007 IIFA Awards, officially known as the 8th International Indian Film Academy Awards ceremony, presented by the International Indian Film Academy honored the best films of 2006 and took place between 7–9 June 2007. The official ceremony took place on 9 June 2007, at the Hallam FM Arena in Sheffield, England. During the ceremony, IIFA Awards were awarded in 29 competitive categories. The ceremony was televised in India and internationally on Star Plus. Actors Boman Irani and Lara Dutta co–hosted the ceremony – the first time.

Some other salient events held during this weekend included the IIFA World Premiere, IIFA–BAFTA Film Workshop, FICCI–IIFA Global Business –um and the IIFA Foundation Celebrity Charity Cricket Match.

The tag line of the IIFA 2007 was IIFA 2007: Yorkshire "Love At First Sight".

IIFA returned to England, UK, after Debutant London 2000.

Rang De Basanti led the ceremony with 15 nominations, followed by Omkara with 11 nominations, Dhoom 2 and Lage Raho Munna Bhai with 10 nominations, Kabhi Alvida Naa Kehna with 9 nominations, and Krrish with 7 nominations.

Rang De Basanti won 11 awards, including Best Film and Best Supporting Actress (Soha Ali Khan), thus becoming the most–awarded film at the ceremony.

Lage Raho Munna Bhai and Omkara won 4 awards each. Other multiple winners included Krrish with 3 awards and Dhoom 2 and Fanaa with two each. In addition, films receiving a single award included, Kabhi Alvida Naa Kehna (Best Actress), Golmaal: Fun Unlimited (Best Comedian), 36 China Town (Best Male Debut) and Gangster (Best Female Debut).

Rajkumar Hirani and A. R. Rahman each won three awards at the ceremony.

== Background ==
The awards began in 2000 and the first ceremony was held in London at The Millennium Dome. From then on the awards were held at locations around the world signifying the international success of Bollywood. The next award ceremony was announced to be held in Bangkok, Thailand in 2008.

== Winners and nominees ==
Winners are listed first and highlighted in boldface.

=== Popular awards ===
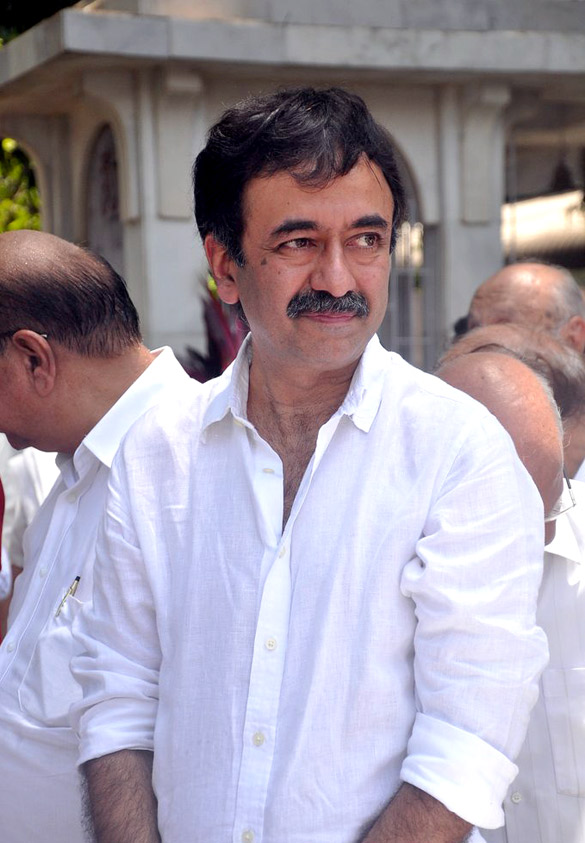
Rajkumar Hirani (Best Director)

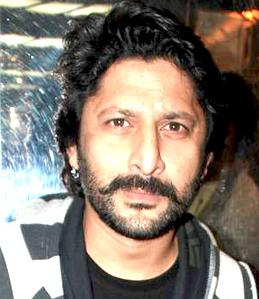
Arshad Warsi (Best Supporting Actor)

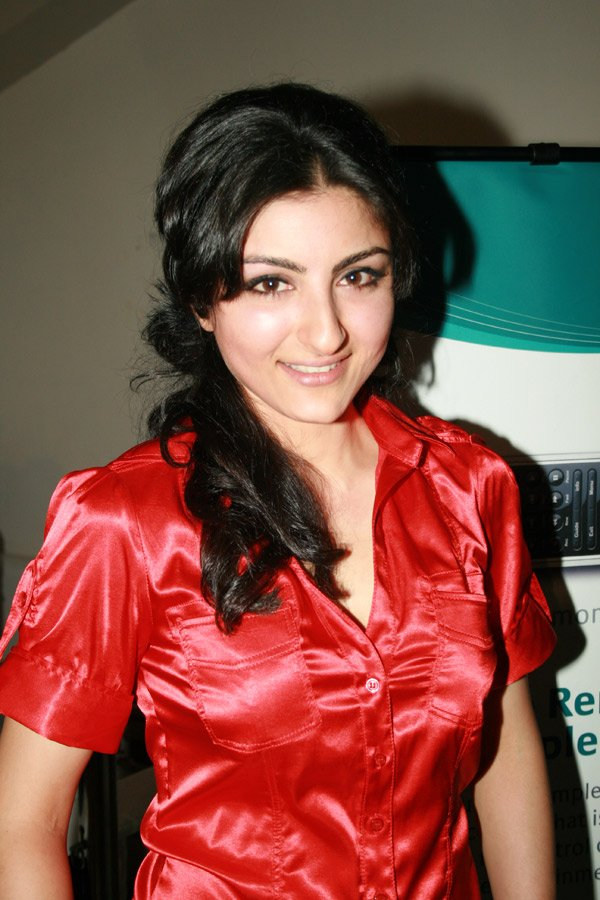
Soha Ali Khan (Best Supporting Actress)

Best Film	Best Director
**Rang De Basanti – UTV Motion Pictures**; Dhoom 2 – Yash Raj Films and AMC Entertainment; Kabhi Alvida Naa Kehna – Dharma Productions and Yash Raj Films; Krrish – Filmkraft Productions (I) Pvt. Ltd.; Lage Raho Munna Bhai – Vinod Chopra Productions; Vivah – Rajshri Productions	**Rajkumar Hirani – Lage Raho Munna Bhai**; Karan Johar – Kabhi Alvida Naa Kehna; Rakesh Roshan – Krrish; Rakeysh Omprakash Mehra – Rang De Basanti; Vishal Bhardwaj – Omkara
Best Performance In A Leading Role Male	Best Performance In A Leading Role Female
**Hrithik Roshan – Krrish as Krishna Mehra / Rohit Mehra / Krrish**; Aamir Khan – Rang De Basanti as Daljeet 'DJ' / Chandrashekhar Azad; Ajay Devgn – Omkara as Omkara 'Omi' Shukla; Sanjay Dutt – Lage Raho Munnabhai as Murli Prasad Sharma or "Munna Bhai"; Shah Rukh Khan – Don as Don / Vijay	**Rani Mukerji – Kabhi Alvida Naa Kehna as Maya Talwar**; Aishwarya Rai – Dhoom 2 as Sunehri; Kajol – Fanaa as Zooni Ali Beg; Kangana Ranaut – Gangster as Simran; Kareena Kapoor – Omkara as Dolly Mishra; Vidya Balan – Lage Raho Munna Bhai as Jhanvi
Best Performance In A Supporting Role Male	Best Performance In A Supporting Role Female
**Arshad Warsi – Lage Raho Munna Bhai as Circuit**; Abhishek Bachchan – Kabhi Alvida Naa Kehna as Rishi Talwar; Amitabh Bachchan – Kabhi Alvida Naa Kehna as Samarjit Singh Talwar (Sexy Sam); Atul Kulkarni – Rang De Basanti as Laxman Pandey / Ramprasad Bismil; Kunal Kapoor – Rang De Basanti as Aslam / Ashfaqullah Khan	**Soha Ali Khan – Rang De Basanti as Sonia / Durga Bhabi**; Bipasha Basu – Dhoom 2 as Shonali Bose / Monali Bose; Kirron Kher – Rang De Basanti as Mitro; Konkona Sen Sharma – Omkara as Indu; Rekha – Krrish as Sonia Mehra
Best Performance In A Comic Role	Best Performance In A Negative Role
**Tusshar Kapoor – Golmaal: Fun Unlimited as Lucky Gill**; Chunkey Pandey – Apna Sapna Money Money as Rana Jang Bahadur; Paresh Rawal – Phir Hera Pheri as Baburao Ganpatrao Apte; Sharman Joshi – Rang De Basanti as Sukhi / Rajguru; Uday Chopra – Dhoom 2 as Ali Akbar Fateh Khan	**Saif Ali Khan – Omkara as Ishwar 'Langda' Tyagi**; Boman Irani – Lage Raho Munna Bhai as Lucky Singh; Emraan Hashmi – Gangster as Akash; Hrithik Roshan – Dhoom 2 as Aryan / Mr. "A"; John Abraham – Zinda as Rohit Chopra
Male Debutant Star	Female Debutant Star
**Upen Patel – 36 China Town as Rocky**	**Kangana Ranaut – Gangster as Simran**

=== Musical awards ===
Best Music Director	Best Lyrics
**A. R. Rahman – Rang De Basanti**; Pritam – Dhoom 2; Rajesh Roshan – Krrish; Shankar–Ehsaan–Loy – Kabhi Alvida Naa Kehna; Vishal Bhardwaj – Omkara	**"Chand Sifarish" from Fanaa – Prasoon Joshi**; "Beedi" from Omkara – Gulzar; "Ru Baroo" from Rang De Basanti – Prasoon Joshi; "Kabhi Alvida Naa Kehna" from Kabhi Alvida Naa Kehna – Javed Akhtar; "Crazy Kiya Re" from Dhoom 2 – Sameer
Best Male Playback Singer	Best Female Playback Singer
**Shaan – "Chand Sifarish" – Fanaa**; A. R. Rahman and Naresh Iyer – "Ru Baroo" – Rang De Basanti; KK – "Tu Hi Meri Shab" – Gangster; Sonu Nigam – "Kabhi Alvida Naa Kehna" – Kabhi Alvida Naa Kehna; Zubeen Garg – "Ya Ali" – Gangster	**Sunidhi Chauhan – "Beedi" – Omkara**; Alka Yagnik – "Kabhi Alvida Naa Kehna" – Kabhi Alvida Naa Kehna; Lata Mangeshkar – "Luka Chhupi" – Rang De Basanti; Shreya Ghoshal – "Pal Pal" – Lage Raho Munnabhai; Sunidhi Chauhan – "Crazy Kiya Re" – Dhoom 2
Best Song Recording	Best Background score
**Rang De Basanti – A. R. Rahman**	**Rang De Basanti – A. R. Rahman**

=== Backstage awards ===
Best Story	Best Screenplay
**Lage Raho Munna Bhai – Rajkumar Hirani**; Dhoom 2 – Aditya Chopra; Krrish – Rakesh Roshan; Omkara – Vishal Bhardwaj; Rang De Basanti – Kamlesh Pandey	**Rang De Basanti – Rensil D'Silva and Rakeysh Omprakash Mehra**; Dhoom 2 – Vijay Krishna Acharya; Gangster – Anurag Basu; Lage Raho Munnabhai – Abhijat Joshi, Rajkumar Hirani and Vidhu Vinod Chopra; Omkara – Vishal Bhardwaj, Abhishek Chaubey and Robin Bhatt
Best Dialogue
**Lage Raho Munnabhai – Abhijat Joshi and Rajkumar Hirani**; Girish Dhamija – Gangster; Prasoon Joshi and Rensil D’Silva – Rang De Basanti; Sanjay Masoom – Krrish; Vishal Bhardwaj – Omkara

=== Technical awards ===
Best Art Direction	Best Action
**Rang De Basanti – Samir Chanda**	**Krrish – Tony Siutung and Shyam Kushal**
Best Cinematographer	Best Choreography
**Rang De Basanti – Binod Pradhan**	**"Beedi Jalaile" from Omkara – Ganesh Acharya**
Best Costume Design	Best Editing
**Dhoom 2 – Anaita Shroff Adajania**	**Rang De Basanti – P. S. Bharathi**
Best Makeup	Best Sound Recording
**Dhoom 2 – G. A. James**	**Rang De Basanti – Nakul Kamte**
Best Sound Re–Recording	Best Special Effects
**Rang De Basanti – Hitendra Gosh**	**Krrish – EFX Studios**

=== Special awards ===
==== Most Glamorous Star ====
- Aishwarya Rai & Hrithik Roshan – Dhoom 2

==== Creative Person of the Year Award ====
- Rakesh Roshan – Krrish

==== Special Award – Best Adaptation ====
- Vishal Bhardwaj – Omkara, adapted from Shakespeare's Othello

==== Outstanding Achievement by an Indian in International Cinema ====
- Deepa Mehta

==== Lifetime Achievement Award ====
- Basu Chatterjee
- Dharmendra

== Superlatives ==
Films with multiple nominations
Nominations	Film
15	Rang De Basanti
11	Omkara
10	Dhoom 2
10	Lage Raho Munna Bhai
9	Kabhi Alvida Naa Kehna
7	Krrish
6	Gangster: A Love Story
3	Fanaa

Films with multiple awards
Awards	Film
11	Rang De Basanti
4	Lage Raho Munna Bhai
3	Krrish
3	Omkara
2	Dhoom 2
2	Fanaa
