= 20th IIFA Awards =

Indian film award ceremony in 2019

- Date: 18 September 2019
- Site: Sardar Vallabhbhai Patel Indoor Stadium; Mumbai, India
- Hosted by: Aparshakti Khurana
- Official website: IIFA Awards 2019

Highlights
- Best Film: Raazi
- Best Direction: Sriram Raghavan (Andhadhun)
- Best Actor: Ranveer Singh (Padmaavat)
- Best Actress: Alia Bhatt (Raazi)
- Most awards: Andhadhun (6)
- Most nominations: Andhadhun (13)

Television coverage
- Network: Colors TV

The 20th IIFA Awards (International Indian Film Academy Awards) were held on 18 September 2019. For the first time in the Awards' history, the awards were held in India, Mumbai. The nominees were announced on 2019.

Raazi led the ceremony with 9 nominations, followed by Andhadhun and Padmaavat with 8 nominations each, Sanju with 6 nominations, and Badhaai Ho with 4 nominations.

Andhadhun won 6 awards, including Best Director (for Sriram Raghavan), thus becoming the most-awarded film at the ceremony.

Vicky Kaushal received dual nominations at the ceremony, having been nominated for Best Actor for Raazi and Best Supporting Actor for Sanju, winning the latter.

== Winners and nominees ==
=== Merit Awards ===
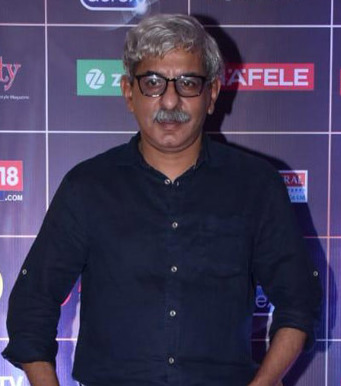
Sriram Raghavan – Best Director winner; Best Story & Best Screenplay co-winner (Andhadhun)

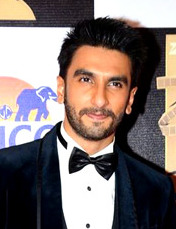
Ranveer Singh – Best Actor winner (Padmaavat)

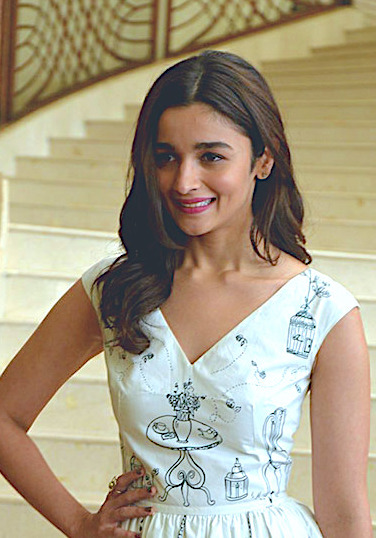
Alia Bhatt – Best Actress winner (Raazi)

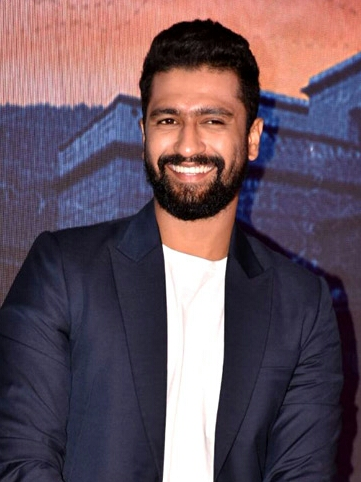
Vicky Kaushal – Best Supporting Actor winner (Sanju)

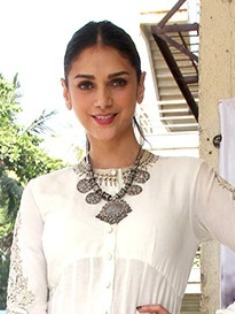
Aditi Rao Hydari – Best Supporting Actress winner (Padmaavat)

Best Film	Best Director
Raazi; Andhadhun; Padmaavat; Sanju; Badhaai Ho; Stree	Sriram Raghavan – Andhadhun; Amit Sharma – Badhaai Ho; Meghna Gulzar – Raazi; Rajkumar Hirani – Sanju; Sanjay Leela Bhansali – Padmaavat; Amar Kaushik – Stree
Best Actor	Best Actress
Ranveer Singh – Padmaavat as Alauddin Khilji; Ayushmann Khurrana – Andhadhun as Akash; Rajkummar Rao – Stree as Vicky; Ranbir Kapoor – Sanju as Sanjay "Sanju" Dutt; Vicky Kaushal – Raazi as Iqbal Syed	Alia Bhatt – Raazi as Sehmat Khan/Syed; Deepika Padukone – Padmaavat as Padmavati; Neena Gupta – Badhaai Ho as Priyamvada Kaushik; Rani Mukerji – Hichki as Naina Mathur; Tabu – Andhadhun as Simi
Best Supporting Actor	Best Supporting Actress
Vicky Kaushal – Sanju as Kamlesh "Kamli" Kanhaiyalal Kapasi; Anil Kapoor – Race 3 as Shamsher Singh; Jim Sarbh – Padmaavat as Malik Kafur; Manoj Pahwa – Mulk as Bilaal Ali Mohammed; Pankaj Tripathi – Stree as Rudra	Aditi Rao Hydari – Padmaavat as Mehrunisa; Neena Gupta – Mulk as Tabassum Mohammed; Radhika Apte – Andhadhun as Sophie; Surekha Sikri – Badhaai Ho as Durga Kaushik; Swara Bhaskar – Veere Di Wedding as Sakshi Soni
Star Debut of the Year – Male	Star Debut of the Year – Female
Ishaan Khatter – Dhadak as Madhukar "Madhu" Bhagla	Sara Ali Khan – Kedarnath as Mandakini "Mukku" Mishra

=== Music Awards ===
Best Music Director	Best Lyricist
Amaal Mallik, Guru Randhawa, Rochak Kohli, Saurabh-Vaibhav, Yo Yo Honey Singh, Zack Knight – Sonu Ke Titu Ki Sweety; Amit Trivedi – Andhadhun; Amit Trivedi – Manmarziyaan; Sanjay Leela Bhansali – Padmaavat; Shankar-Ehsaan-Loy – Raazi	Amitabh Bhattacharya – "Dhadak (Title Track)" – Dhadak; Gulzar – "Ae Watan" – Raazi; Irshad Kamil – "Mera Naam Tu" – Zero; Jaideep Sahni – "Naina Da Kya Kasoor" – Andhadhun; Shellee – "Daryaa" – Manmarziyaan
Best Male Playback Singer	Best Female Playback Singer
Arijit Singh – "Ae Watan" – Raazi; Abhay Jodhpurkar – "Mera Naam Tu" – Zero; Amit Trivedi – "Naina Da Kya Kasoor" – Andhadhun; Arijit Singh – "Tera Yaar Hoon Main" – Sonu Ke Titu Ki Sweety; Sukhwinder Singh – "Kar Har Maidan Fateh" – Sanju	Harshdeep Kaur & Vibha Saraf – "Dilbaro" – Raazi; Shreya Ghoshal – "Ghoomar" – Padmaavat; Sunidhi Chauhan – "Ae Watan" – Raazi; Sunidhi Chauhan – "Main Badhiya Tu Bhi Badhiya" – Sanju; Tulsi Kumar – "Paniyon Sa" – Satyameva Jayate

=== Technical Awards ===
Best Story	Best Dialogue
Sriram Raghavan, Arijit Biswas, Pooja Ladha Surti, Yogesh Chandekar & Hemanth Rao – Andhadhun	Akshat Ghildial – Badhaai Ho
Best Screenplay	Best Editing
Sriram Raghavan, Arijit Biswas, Pooja Ladha Surti, Yogesh Chandekar & Hemanth Rao – Andhadhun	Pooja Ladha Surti – Andhadhun
Best Cinematography	Best Choreography
Sudeep Chatterjee – Padmaavat	Kruti Mahesh & Jyoti D Tommar – "Ghoomar" – Padmaavat
Best Background Score	Best Special Effects
Daniel B. George – Andhadhun	Filmgate Films AB – Tumbbad
Best Sound Design	Best Sound Mixing
Kunal Sharma – Tumbbad	Ajay Kumar PB – Andhadhun

=== Special awards ===
Outstanding Contribution To Indian Cinema	IIFA BIG 20 Award for Best Film
Jagdeep; Saroj Khan	Rakesh Roshan – Kaho Naa Pyaar Hai
IIFA BIG 20 Award for Best Director	IIFA BIG 20 Award for Best Music Director
Rajkumar Hirani – 3 Idiots	Pritam – Ae Dil Hai Mushkil
IIFA BIG 20 Award for Best Actor	IIFA BIG 20 Award for Best Actress
Ranbir Kapoor – Barfi!	Deepika Padukone – Chennai Express

== Superlatives ==
Films with multiple nominations
Nominations	Film
9	Raazi
8	Andhadhun
8	Padmaavat
6	Sanju
4	Badhaai Ho
2	Manmarziyaan
2	Mulk
2	Sonu Ke Titu Ki Sweety
2	Stree
2	Zero

Films with multiple awards
Awards	Film
6	Andhadhun
4	Padmaavat
4	Raazi
2	Dhadak
2	Tumbbad
