= IIFA Lifetime Achievement Award =

Film award in India

IIFA Award for Lifetime Achievement
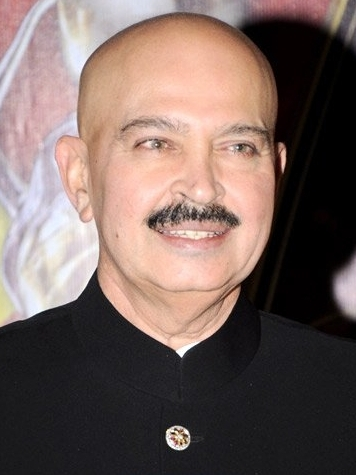
- The 2025 recipient: Rakesh Roshan
- Awarded for: Commemorating an artist's career
- Country: India
- Presented by: International Indian Film Academy
- First award: Sunil Dutt & Lata Mangeshkar (2000)
- Currently held by: Rakesh Roshan (2025)
- Website: http://www.iifa.com

The IIFA Lifetime Achievement Award is an Indian cinema prize, one of International Indian Film Academy Awards.

== List of Honourees ==
The recipients of this award are listed below.

Year	Image	Honorees	Occupation
2025		Rakesh Roshan	Director
2024		Hema Malini	Actress
2024		Jayantilal Gada	Producer
2023		Kamal Haasan	Actor
2022	No award		
2021	No award		
2019		Jagdeep	Actor
2019		Saroj Khan	Choreographer
2018		Anupam Kher	Actor
2017	No award		
2016	No award		
2015		Subhash Ghai	Director
2014		Shatrughan Sinha	Actor
2013		Javed Akhtar	Screenwriter / Lyricist
2012		Rekha	Actress
2011		Asha Bhosle	Singer
2011		Sharmila Tagore	Actress
2010		Zeenat Aman	Actress
2009		Rajesh Khanna	Actor
2008		Shyam Benegal	Director
2008		Mumtaz	Actress
2007		Dharmendra	Actor
2007		Basu Chatterjee	Director
2006		Asha Parekh	Actress
2005		V.K. Murthy	Cinematographer
2005		Shabana Azmi	Actress
2004		Dilip Kumar	Actor
2004		Yash Johar	Director
2003		Kalyanji Anandji	Music Director
2003		Dev Anand	Actor
2002		Sadhana	Actress
2002		Yash Chopra	Director
2001		Shammi Kapoor	Actor
2001		Waheeda Rehman	Actress
2000		Lata Mangeshkar	Singer
2000		Sunil Dutt	Actor
