= Pink (2016 film) =

2016 Indian film by Aniruddha Roy Chowdhury

- Theatrical release poster
- Directed by: Aniruddha Roy Chowdhury
- Written by: Ritesh Shah
- Story by: Shoojit Sircar; Ritesh Shah; Aniruddha Roy Chowdhury
- Produced by: Ronnie Lahiri; Rashmi Sharma; Sheel Kumar
- Starring: Amitabh Bachchan; Taapsee Pannu; Kirti Kulhari; Andrea Tariang; Vijay Varma; Angad Bedi; Tushar Pandey; Dhritiman Chatterjee; Piyush Mishra; Mamata Shankar
- Cinematography: Abhik Mukhopadhyay
- Edited by: Bodhaditya Banerjee
- Music by: Shantanu Moitra; Anupam Roy
- Production company: Rising Sun Films
- Release date: 16 September 2016
- Running time: 136 minutes
- Country: India
- Language: Hindi
- Budget: ₹30 crore
- Box office: est. ₹157.32 crore

Pink is a 2016 Indian Hindi-language legal thriller film directed by Aniruddha Roy Chowdhury and written by Shoojit Sircar, Ritesh Shah and Aniruddha Roy Chowdhury. The film is produced by Rising Sun Films on a total budget of ₹30 crore, with screenplay by Shah and music composition by Shantanu Moitra and Anupam Roy. Pink features an ensemble cast, which includes Amitabh Bachchan, Taapsee Pannu, Kirti Kulhari, Andrea Tariang, Angad Bedi, Tushar Pandey, Piyush Mishra, and Dhritiman Chatterjee.

Pink was released worldwide in cinemas on 16 September 2016. The film received widespread critical acclaim for the cast performances, execution, story, screenplay and direction. Pink emerged as a surprising commercial success earning over ₹157.32 crore globally. The film completed a 50-day run theatrically.

At the 64th National Film Awards, Pink won the category of Best Film on Other Social Issues. Pink received 5 nominations at the 62nd Filmfare Awards, including Best Film, Best Actor (Bachchan) and Best Supporting Actress (Kulhari), and won Best Dialogue (Ritesh Shah).

The film is remade in Tamil as Nerkonda Paarvai (2019) and in Telugu as Vakeel Saab (2021).

== Plot ==
Minal, Falak, and Andrea are introduced to Rajveer, Raunak, and their mutual friend Vishwajyoti during a night out in New Delhi. After sharing drinks, the group heads to a resort, but the night ends abruptly when the men rush to a hospital to treat Rajveer for a severe, bleeding head wound. Concurrently, the three women return to their shared apartment deeply shaken, hinting at their involvement in the incident. Though they attempt to move on, they are quickly subjected to targeted harassment. Rajveer’s friend, Ankit, threatens their landlord and launches a sexually explicit smear campaign against them online, which ultimately costs Falak her job. When the women attempt to seek legal recourse, local police discourage them, protective of the men's political ties to Rajveer's influential uncle, Ranjit. Undeterred, Minal escalates the issue with the help of her boss and successfully files a formal complaint with a higher-ranking officer.

In retaliation, Rajveer's friends abduct Minal during her morning run. The incident is witnessed by Deepak, an enigmatic elderly neighbor who is unable to intervene in time. The men molest, blackmail, and traumatize Minal inside a moving car before dumping her back home. Days later, the situation worsens when Minal is arrested on attempted murder charges after Rajveer files a counter-complaint painting the three women as sex workers. Distraught by the systemic injustice, Falak and Andrea seek counsel from Deepak, discovering that he is actually a highly reputable, retired criminal defense attorney. Driven by his conscience, Deepak handles the bail procedures and steps out of retirement to represent Minal in court.

In the courtroom, prosecuting attorney Prashant Mehra orchestrates a character assassination against the women. He claims they willingly accompanied the men to the resort, initiated intimacy, and demanded money. Prashant argues that when Rajveer refused to pay for their services, an enraged Minal struck him with a bottle. To sway the court, he systematically attacks their morals, highlighting that Minal chooses to live independently away from her Delhi-based family, drinks alcohol, and stays out late. Conversely, Deepak presents the defense's timeline: the men deliberately isolated the women at the resort, and when Rajveer attempted to rape Minal, she struck him with a bottle in absolute self-defense.

Deepak shifts the trial's focus entirely to the fundamental issue of consent. During a tense cross-examination, Deepak deliberately provokes Rajveer, causing the young man to lose his temper and expose his true colors. Rajveer aggressively insults the women, shouting that they "got what they deserved" simply for choosing to drink and socialize with men. Capitalizing on this outburst, Deepak delivers a powerful closing argument criticizing society's regressive double standards, where independent women are automatically deemed characterless for their lifestyle choices while men are excused for predatory behavior. He firmly establishes that when a woman says "no," it is an absolute boundary that requires no further explanation or validation.

Ultimately, Minal, Falak, and Andrea are fully acquitted of all charges. Rajveer, Ankit, and Raunak are arrested and held for sentencing, while Vishwajyoti is let off with a strict warning. An end-credits sequence confirms the absolute truth of Minal's account, showing the terrifying moment Rajveer tried to force himself on her and her subsequent act of self-defense.

== Cast ==
- Amitabh Bachchan as Deepak Sehgal
- Taapsee Pannu as Minal Arora
- Kirti Kulhari as Falak Ali
- Andrea Tariang as Andrea
- Angad Bedi as Rajveer Singh
- Dhritiman Chatterjee as Judge Satyajit Dutt
- Piyush Mishra as Prashant Mehra
- Vijay Varma as Ankit Malhotra
- Tushar Pandey as Vishwa a.k.a. Vishwajyoti Ghosh
- Dibang as JCP Amod
- Mamta Shankar as Sara Sehgal (Deepak's wife)
- Vinod Nagpal as Kasturi Lal (Landlord)
- Arjun Chakrabarty as Ritwik
- Raashul Tandon as Raunak Anand aka Dumpy

== Production ==
In early March 2016 Amitabh Bachchan revealed that he was shooting a film in Delhi. It was rumoured that the film was titled "Eve". On 13 March Bachchan denied the rumours and announced through Twitter that the film is titled Pink.

Director-producer Shoojit Sircar informed that Amitabh Bachchan accepted the role and Taapsee Pannu was their first choice. Andrea Tariang was also selected to play the role of one of the girls in the film. Tushar Pandey, Raashul Tandon and Arjun Chakraborty are making their debut with this film.

=== Filming ===
The principal photography of the film began in New Delhi on International Women's Day, 2016. The looks of Amitabh Bachchan in the movie was created by Shoojit Sircar however the idea of wearing the mask was suggested by Amitabh Bachchan since Delhi is very polluted.

During the shoot, Amitabh Bachchan wandered the streets of New Delhi while wearing a costume in which the public could not recognise him. Amitabh Bachchan finished filming his scenes in April 2016.

Taapsee often broke down on the shooting sets as she felt her character was very strong and challenging. She suffered from viral infection during the court scenes and wanted to dub later, however Shoojit felt that her illness would add more authenticity to the scenes. Despite the hardships Taapsee enjoyed filming the scenes.

The original climax of Rajvir and his friends winning the case was modified so as not to hurt the sentiments of the audience.

A special screening of the film was held for Amitabh Bachchan's co stars and the leading ladies of Bollywood. However Amitabh Bachchan could not attend the screening due to health issues. Taapsee also arranged a special screening of the film for the Telugu film industry at Hyderabad.

Bishan Singh Bedi, father of Angad Bedi, arranged a special screening of the film in Delhi which was attended by cricketers like Kapil Dev, Virender Sehwag and Yuvraj Singh.

=== Marketing ===
Shoojit Sircar and Amitabh Bachchan questioned their fans on Twitter as to what they think the film title "Pink" is all about. Times of India had opened a contest in which 5 lucky winners got a chance to meet Amitabh Bachchan and other 10 winners got free movie tickets of the movie -Pink. The winners were announced on 15-September-2016.

The world television premier was held on 23 – October 2016 on Star Gold and to commemorate the same, Amitabh Bachchan's house Jalsa, Carter Road Promenade and SNDT Women's University were illuminated in pink colour.

The title of the film has no relationship as being the favourite colour of girls but rather conveys that women should have the freedom to speak and walk freely at night.

== Soundtrack ==
Pink
No.	Title	Lyrics	Music	Singer(s)	Length
1.	"Jeenay De Mujhe"	Faiza Mujahid	Faiza Mujahid	Faiza Mujahid	03:58
2.	"Kaari Kaari"	Tanveer Ghazi	Shantanu Moitra	Qurat-ul-Ain Balouch	06:27
3.	"Tujhse Hi Hai Roshni"	Anupam Roy	Anupam Roy	Anupam Roy	04:28
4.	"Pink Anthem"	Irshad Kamil	Anupam Roy	Jonita Gandhi, EPR Iyer	03:47
5.	"Tu Chal"	Tanveer Ghazi	Shantanu Moitra	Amitabh Bachchan	03:08
Total length:					21:48

== Release ==
The film was specially screened for the Rajasthan Police so as to train them to be sensitive and sensible about women's rights and dignity. The film was also specially screened at Rashtrapati Bhavan and invited for a screening at the United Nations headquarters in New York City.

== Critical reception ==
On the review aggregator website Rotten Tomatoes, 100% of 13 critics' reviews are positive, with an average rating of 8.1/10.

Meena Iye of The Times of India and Shubha Shetty Saha of Indiatimes gave the film 4.5 stars. Mayank Shekhar from Mid-Day gave the film 4/5 stars, saying, "The film, up until the closing credits, does not even visually describe the said incident. It grips you still with a gently piercing background score, moments of silence and dialogue, building up the tension, while the audience wonders what really could have happened one unfortunate night when three girls found themselves in a Surajkund resort with three guys."

Anna M.M. Vetticad of Firstpost called Pink a powerful film. Filmfare, India Today, Mumbai Mirror, Hindustan Times, The Statesman, and DNA have given 4/5 stars, highly appreciating the superlative performances, especially of Amitabh Bachchan. Critics like Anusha Iyengar and Mayank Shekhar called it movie of the year. Namrata Joshi of The Hindu also praised the film. Shubhra Gupta of Indian Express gave the film 3.5 stars.

Rajeev Masand from News18 rated the movie as 4.5/5 mentioning that "I left the cinema, my mouth dry at the end of Pink. This isn't just an important film, but also excellently made. It's a giant leap for Hindi cinema, and easily the best film this year".

== Box office ==
Pink grossed approximately ₹4.32 crore on first day in India. The first weekend collection was ₹21.51 crore.

At the end of 7 days the domestic box office collection was ₹35.91 crore. Pink grossed ₹50 crore in first 10 days in India.

== Accolades ==
Award	Date of ceremony	Category	Recipient(s) and nominee(s)	Result	Ref.
National Film Awards	7 April 2017	Best Film on Social Issues	Director: Aniruddha Roy Chowdhury; Producer: Rashmi Sharma Films	Won	
Indian Film Festival of Melbourne	August 2017	Best Film	Director: Aniruddha Roy Chowdhury; Producer: Rashmi Sharma Films	Won	
Filmfare Awards	14 January 2017	Best Film	Rashmi Sharma, Pawan Kumar, Shoojit Sircar and Sheel Kumar	Nominated	
Filmfare Awards	14 January 2017	Best Actor	Amitabh Bachchan	Nominated	
Filmfare Awards	14 January 2017	Best Supporting Actress	Kirti Kulhari	Nominated	
Filmfare Awards	14 January 2017	Best Female Playback Singer	Qurat-ul-Ain Balouch for song "Kaari Kaari"	Nominated	
Filmfare Awards	14 January 2017	Best Dialogue	Ritesh Shah	Won	
Star Screen Awards	4 December 2016	Best Film	Pawan Kumar and Rashmi Sharma	Won	
Star Screen Awards	4 December 2016	Best Actor	Amitabh Bachchan	Won	
Star Screen Awards	4 December 2016	Best Dialogue	Ritesh Shah	Won	
Star Screen Awards	4 December 2016	Best Editing	Bodhaditya Banerjee	Won	
Stardust Awards	19 December 2016	Best Film	Rashmi Sharma; Pawan Kumar	Nominated	
Stardust Awards	19 December 2016	Best Director	Aniruddha Roy Chowdhury	Nominated	
Stardust Awards	19 December 2016	Best Actor (Male)	Amitabh Bachchan	Won	
Stardust Awards	19 December 2016	Best Screenplay	Ritesh Shah	Nominated	
Stardust Awards	19 December 2016	Best Debutant (Female)	Andrea Tariang	Nominated	
Zee Cine Awards	11 March 2017	Best Film (Critics)	Pink	Won	
Zee Cine Awards	11 March 2017	Best Film	Pink	Nominated	
Zee Cine Awards	11 March 2017	Best Director	Aniruddha Roy Chowdhury	Nominated	
Zee Cine Awards	11 March 2017	Best Actor - Male (Critics)	Amitabh Bachchan	Won	
Zee Cine Awards	11 March 2017	Best Actor (Male)	Amitabh Bachchan	Nominated	
Zee Cine Awards	11 March 2017	Best Story	Ritesh Shah	Nominated	
Zee Cine Awards	11 March 2017	Best Dialogue	Ritesh Shah	Won	
Zee Cine Awards	11 March 2017	Best Female Debut	Andrea Tariang	Nominated	
Zee Cine Awards	11 March 2017	Best Directorial Debut	Aniruddha Roy Chowdhury	Nominated	
Mirchi Music Awards	16 February 2017	Female Vocalist of The Year	Qurat-ul-Ain Balouch for "Kaari Kaari"	Nominated	
Mirchi Music Awards	16 February 2017	Upcoming Female Vocalist of The Year	Qurat-ul-Ain Balouch for "Kaari Kaari"	Nominated	
Mirchi Music Awards	16 February 2017	Best Background Score	Shantanu Moitra	Nominated	
International Indian Film Academy Awards	14–15 July 2017	Best Film	Rashmi Sharma, Pawan Kumar, Shoojit Sircar and Sheel Kumar	Nominated	
International Indian Film Academy Awards	14–15 July 2017	Best Director	Aniruddha Roy Chowdhury	Won	
International Indian Film Academy Awards	14–15 July 2017	Best Actor	Amitabh Bachchan	Nominated	
International Indian Film Academy Awards	14–15 July 2017	Best Actress	Taapsee Pannu	Nominated	
International Indian Film Academy Awards	14–15 July 2017	Best Supporting Actress	Kirti Kulhari	Nominated	
International Indian Film Academy Awards	14–15 July 2017	Best Supporting Actress	Andrea Tariang	Nominated	
International Indian Film Academy Awards	14–15 July 2017	Best Lyricist	Tanveer Ghazi for "Tu Chal"	Nominated	
International Indian Film Academy Awards	14–15 July 2017	Best Screenplay	Ritesh Shah	Won	
International Indian Film Academy Awards	14–15 July 2017	Best Dialogue	Ritesh Shah	Won	
International Indian Film Academy Awards	14–15 July 2017	Best Editing	Bodhaditya Bandyopadhyay	Won	
AACTA Awards	6 December 2017	Best Asian Film	Rashmi Sharma, Pawan Kumar, Shoojit Sircar and Sheel Kumar	Nominated	

== Remakes ==
Language	Movie name	Actors	Director	Release year
Tamil language	Nerkonda Paarvai	Ajith Kumar	H. Vinoth	2019
Telugu language	Vakeel Saab	Pawan Kalyan	Venu Sriram	2021

== Bibliography ==
- Gautam, Chintamani (2017). Pink : The Inside Story. Harper Collins. ISBN 978-9352770397.
