= Pritam and Pedro =

2026 JioHotstar series

- Created by: Rajkumar Hirani
- Written by: Rajkumar Hirani; Abhijat Joshi; Suyash Trivedi
- Dialogues by: Pranjal Saxena; Shashank Kunwar; Rajkumar Hirani
- Directed by: Avinash Arun
- Starring: Arshad Warsi; Vir Hirani; Vikrant Massey; Boman Irani; Mona Singh; Rajesh Sharma; Satyadeep Mishra; Shruti Marathe
- Theme music composer: Vishal Khurana K
- Composers: Songs: Shantanu Moitra; Score: Sanjay Wandrekar
- Country of origin: India
- Original language: Hindi
- No. of seasons: 1
- No. of episodes: 6

Production
- Executive producer: Sanjiv Kishinchandani
- Producer: Rajkumar Hirani
- Cinematography: Avinash Arun
- Editor: Rajkumar Hirani
- Running time: 32–37 minutes
- Production company: Rajkumar Hirani Films

Original release
- Network: JioHotstar
- Release: 3 July 2026

Pritam and Pedro is a 2026 Indian cybercrime comedy thriller television series created and produced by Rajkumar Hirani. It has been directed by Avinash Arun. The series began streaming from 3 July 2026 on JioHotstar.

This series marked Hirani's debut as a producer and creator in the streaming media. This series also marked the debut of Hirani's son Vir Hirani. Along with Arshad Warsi, Vir plays the lead role in the series.

== Plot ==
The series follows, Pritam, a young, tech-savvy coding expert, and Pedro, an old-school police officer in Goa. After Pritam is arrested following a dispute with the police regarding a lost tape recorder, he impresses them by quickly helping solve a major ATM theft using his cyber skills. As a result, Pedro drops him home. Later, Pedro is assigned a case of a lost phone of the Sports Ministers wife. He suspects their son, Vinny, but the minister and his wife refuse his investigation. Pedro decides to buy an identical phone and give it to her along with a fake thief. However the phone was already found in Vinny’s room. He is then transferred to IT cell of the department, a major punishment. He calls Pritam for help in one of his cases involving a killer committing suicide, in which they both manage to save everyone who was at risk, together. Then the story begins to reach a prime when Vinny, the son of the minister is seemingly missing and kidnapped.

== Cast ==
- Arshad Warsi as Pedro Gonsalves
- Vir Hirani as Pritam Parker / Kabir Sahani
- Vikrant Massey as Martin Fonseca
- Mona Singh as Stacey Gonsalves
- Satyadeep Mishra as Sports Minister Dileep N. Sardesai
- Shruti Marathe as Shraddha Sardesai
- Rajesh Sharma as Sub Inspector Carlos Lobo
- Mohit Chauhan as DIG Arvind Rao
- Shreyansh Kaurav as Vini Sardesai
- Nachiket Purnapatre as Hari Nair; Blackmailer
- Bharat Ganeshpure as Manager Saathe
- Naina Sareen as Sherlyn
- Jayant Gadekar as Jayant Rege
- Ajay Madhok as Raj Taneja
- Ajay Jadhav as Bhalekar
- Sandeep Jhawar as Nitin Menon
- Apoorva Mehra as Nina Joseph Fonseca
- Gaurav More as ATM Thief Dulha
- Bhavna Pani as Ana Goretti
- Vinod Nagpal as Dada Ji
- Ashwin Mushran

=== Guest ===
- Sanjay Dutt as Himself
- Virender Sehwag as Himself
- Boman Irani as Professor Fonseca
- Harshika Kewalramani as Chakachank Chandni

== Development ==
Hirani mentioned in an interview that Pritam and Pedro would be a "fun series". He added that he got the idea for this series during the COVID-19 lockdown, when the Mumbai Cyber Cell had approached him to make a film on cybercrime. Later he met writer Amit Dubey, and after discussing over with him, the idea was finalized.

The trailer was released on 15 June 2026. During the premier, Arshad Warsi hinted that Sanjay Dutt could be seen playing a cameo in the series.

== Release ==
Pritam and Pedro began streaming on JioHotstar on 3 July 2026.

== Reception ==
=== Critical reception ===
Tanisha Bhattacharya of NDTV rated the series 4/5 stars and wrote "Arshad Warsi is excellent in Pritam & Pedro, while Vir Hirani leaves a lasting impression in his debut series." Shubhra Gupta of the Indian Express rated the series 2/5 stars and opined "Arshad Warsi-starrer show fits right within the Rajkumar Hirani universe in which the baddies come with sad backstories and mitigation." Poulomi Das of The Quint reviewed the series and opined "'Pritam and Pedro' has no granularity. It is cybercrime explained at the level of a school assembly."

Rahul Desai of the The Hollywood Reporter reviewed the swries and noted "A lot of the humour plays out like it expects audience reactions in the theatre, or even applause cues within the scenes. The performances are nothing to write — or type — home about. The supporting cast and cameos are largely ineffective." Sukanya Verma of Rediff rated the series 2/5 stars and wrote "Arshad Warsi can create an air of levity around anybody but Vir Hirani's stiff screen presence as Pritam Parkar has no vibe to match his peevish, pitiable Pedro Gonsalves, observes Sukanya Verma."

Anuj Kumar of The Hindu reviewed the series and highlighted "Bringing his magical touch to long-form storytelling, Rajkumar Hirani turns a cold, clinical cyber-thriller into a heartwarming buddy-cop comedy where old-school muscle beautifully collides with modern computer code." A critic from Bollywood Hungama rated the series 3.5/5 stars and noted "On the whole, PRITAM AND PEDRO works due to its nail-biting narrative, fast-paced storytelling, the relevance of its cybercrime backdrop and the dependable presence of Arshad Warsi. However, the cinematic liberties and a few rushed developments dent the impact to some extent."

Nandini Ramnath of the Scroll.in reviewed the series and wrote "Fortunately, the series is tight enough to wrap up its themes and position itself for a second season of crime-solving that needs brawn, brains and a big heart." Archika Khurana of The Times of India rated the series 3.5/5 stars and opined "The show’s biggest limitation lies in its predictability. Certain twists feel familiar, and some conflicts are resolved a little too conveniently. Still, these flaws do little to dilute the show’s overall charm. Overall, it is an entertaining blend of humour, suspense and heart that makes for a thoroughly enjoyable binge."

Abhishek Srivastava of Moneycontrol rated the series 3.5/5 stars and noted "‘Pritam and Pedro’ is a simple and warm cybercrime story that never feels heavy or complicated and keeps things easy to follow. Powered by strong performances and light humour, it turns into an easy, feel-good watch." Shweta Keshri of India Today rated the series 3.5/5 stars and wrote "The series, featuring Arshad Warsi and Vir Hirani, pairs a cyber-savvy young man with an old-school officer on a kidnapping case. The series is a light-hearted buddy-cop drama set in Goa, blending simple cyber crime with humour and heartfelt moments."

Raja Sen of Mint reviewed the series and wrote "In his new series ‘Pritam and Pedro’, Rajkumar Hirani is again oversimplifying things and talking down to his audience." Devesh Sharma of Filmfare reviewed the series and opined "It entertains, makes you laugh, keeps you guessing and quietly reminds you how vulnerable we have all become in the online age. Backed by superb writing and wonderfully lived-in performances, it marks a confident and thoroughly enjoyable OTT debut for Rajkumar Hirani." Shreyanka Mazumdar of News18 rated the series 2.5/5 stars and noted "Pritam and Pedro is an entertaining cybercrime thriller that doesn't always hit the mark, but Arshad Warsi and Vir Hirani's chemistry makes this six-episode series a breezy binge."
