= Screen Award for Best Dialogue =

Annual film award in India

The winners of the Star Screen Awards for Best Dialogue are listed below:

| Year | Winner | Film |
|---|---|---|
| 2007 | Abhijat Joshi & Rajkumar Hirani | Lage Raho Munna Bhai |
| 2008 | Amole Gupte | Taare Zameen Par |
| 2010 | Abhijat Joshi & Rajkumar Hirani | 3 Idiots |
| 2011 | Habib Faisal | Band Baaja Baraat |
| 2012 | Rajat Aroraa (tie); Farhan Akhtar, Javed Akhtar | The Dirty Picture; Zindagi Na Milegi Dobara |
| 2013 | Bhavesh Mandalia, Umesh Shukla | OMG: Oh My God! |
| 2014 | Sameer Gautam Singh | Shahid |
| 2015 | Abhijat Joshi & Rajkumar Hirani | PK |
| 2016 | Juhi Chaturvedi | Piku |
| 2017 | Ritesh Shah | Pink |
| 2020 | Vijay Maurya | Gully Boy |

== See also ==
- Screen Awards
- Bollywood
- Cinema of India
