= Screen Award for Best Editing =

Indian annual film award

The Screen Award for Best Editing is chosen by a distinguished panel of judges from the Indian Bollywood film industry and the winners are announced in January.

== Winners ==
=== 1990s ===
- 1994 Hum Aapke Hain Koun..! – Mukhtar Ahmed
- 1995 Haqeeqat – Kuldeep Mohan
- 1996 Is Raat Ki Subah Nahin – Renu Saluja
- 1997 Virasat – N. Gopalakrishnan
- 1998 Soldier – Hussain A. Burmawala
- 1999 Sarfarosh – Jeethu Mandal

=== 2000s ===
- 2000 Kaho Naa... Pyaar Hai – Sanjay Varma
  - Hera Pheri – N. Gopalakrishnan
  - Josh – Zafar Sultan
  - Jungle – Chandan Arora
  - Khiladi 420 – Ratnakar Phadke
- 2001 Lagaan: Once Upon a Time in India – Ballu Saluja
  - Ajnabee – Hussain A. Burmawala
  - Aks – P. S. Bharathi
  - Bawandar – Jag Mundhra
  - Dil Chahta Hai – A. Sreekar Prasad
- 2002 Company – Chandan Arora
  - Devdas – Bela Sehgal
  - Humraaz – Hussain A. Burmawala
  - Kaante – Bunty Nagi
  - The Legend of Bhagat Singh – V. N. Mayekar
- 2003 Kal Ho Naa Ho – Sanjay Sankla
  - Bhoot – Shimit Amin
  - Darna Mana Hai – Amit Parmar and Nipun Gupta
  - Munna Bhai M.B.B.S. – Rajkumar Hirani
  - Waisa Bhi Hota Hai Part II – Neerav Ghosh
- 2004 Dhoom – Rameshwar S. Bhagat
  - Ab Tak Chappan – Murad Siddiqui
  - Ek Hasina Thi – Sanjib Datta
  - Musafir – Bunty Nagi
  - Yuva – A. Sreekar Prasad
- 2005 Yahaan – Shekhar
  - Apaharan – Santosh Mandal
  - Black – Bela Sehgal
  - Hazaaron Khwaishein Aisi – Catherine D'Hoir
  - Sarkar – Amit Parmar and Nipun Gupta
- 2006 Lage Raho Munnabhai – Rajkumar Hirani
  - Gangster – Akiv Ali
  - Rang De Basanti – P. S. Bharathi
  - Taxi No. 9211 – Aarif Sheikh
- 2007 Chak De! India – Amitabh Shukla
  - Black Friday – Aarti Bajaj
  - Johnny Gaddaar – Pooja Ladha Surti
  - Life In A... Metro – Akiv Ali
  - Shootout at Lokhandwala – Bunty Nagi
- 2008 Rock On!! – Deepa Bhatia
  - Aamir – Aarti Bajaj
  - Race – Hussain A. Burmawala
  - Sarkar Raj – Amit Parmar and Nipun Gupta
  - A Wednesday! – Shree Narayan Singh
- 2009 3 Idiots – Rajkumar Hirani
  - Dev.D – Aarti Bajaj
  - Love Aaj Kal – Aarti Bajaj
  - Paa – Anil Naidu
  - Kaminey – Meghna Manchanda Sen & A. Sreekar Prasad

=== 2010s ===
- 2010 Band Baaja Baaraat – Namrata Rao
  - Dabangg – Pranav Dhiwar
  - Love Sex Aur Dhokha – Namrata Rao
  - Ishqiya – Namrata Rao
  - Peepli Live – Hemanti Sarkar
  - Raajneeti – Santosh Mondal
- 2011 Delhi Belly – Hufeza Lokhandwala
  - No One Killed Jessica – Aarti Bajaj
  - Shaitan – Sreekar Prasad
  - Yeh Saali Zindagi – Archit D. Rastogi
  - Zindagi Na Milegi Dobara – Anand Subaya
- 2013 Kai Po Che! – Deepa Bhatia
- 2014 Mardaani – Sanjib Datta
- 2016 Pink – Bodhaditya Banerjee
- 2018 Andhadhun – Pooja Ladha Surti
- 2019 War – Aarif Sheikh

== See also ==
- Cinema of India
