= IIFA Award for Best Makeup =

Awards for Makeup

The IIFA Best Makeup is a technical award chosen ahead of the ceremonies.

== Multiple wins ==
Wins	Recipient
2	Mickey Contractor

== Awards ==
The winners are listed below:-

Year	winner	Film	Ref
2017	Greg Cannom	Fan	
2016	Vikram Gaikwad	Tanu Weds Manu Returns	
2015	Preetisheel Singh & Clover Wootton	Haider	
2011	Banu	Robot	
2010	Christien Tinsley, Domini Till	Paa	
2009	Madhav Kadam	Jodhaa Akbar	
2008	Bharat-Dorris, Ravi Indulkar and Namrata Soni	Om Shanti Om	
2007	G. A. James	Dhoom 2	
2006	Vidyadhar Bhatte	Parineeta	
2005	Anil Pemgirikar	Veer-Zaara	
2004	Mickey Contractor	Kal Ho Naa Ho	
2002	Mickey Contractor	Kabhi Khushi Kabhie Gham	
2000	Jayanti Shevale	Hum Saath Saath Hain	

== See also ==
- IIFA Awards
- Bollywood
- Cinema of India
