= Abhijat Joshi =

Indian screenwriter

- Born: 1 December 1969 (age 56); Ahmedabad, Gujarat, India
- Occupations: Screenwriter; producer; director; editor
- Known for: Lage Raho Munna Bhai (2006); 3 Idiots (2009); PK (2014); Sanju (2018)
- Spouse: Shobha Joshi
- Children: 1
- Relatives: Saumya Joshi (younger brother)

Abhijat Joshi (born 1 December 1969) is an Indian screenwriter, film director, producer and editor who works in Hindi cinema. He is known for collaboration with Vinod Chopra Productions and director Rajkumar Hirani, as the screenwriter for Lage Raho Munna Bhai (2006), 3 Idiots (2009), PK (2014) and Sanju (2018). He has been a professor of English at Otterbein University in Westerville, Ohio, since 2003.

== Early life and education ==
Joshi was born and brought up in Ahmedabad.

== Career ==
He studied at Shree Vidyanagar High School in Ahmedabad, where he took part in the annual competitions for Gujarati dramas in the school.

Apart from teaching, he was also involved in theatre activities. His younger brother Saumya Joshi was also professor and is now theatre personality. His father and mother also were professors. During 1992 Gujarat riots, he wrote a theatre production, "A Shaft of Sunlight", which was critically acclaimed; subsequently director Vidhu Vinod Chopra saw the play, which led to them working together in the films, Kareeb and Mission Kashmir. A UK based Tamasha Theatre Company in collaboration with Greenwich Repertory Company performed more than 300 Shows, later the play was also adapted in Gujarati as "Marmbhed".

Like his father Jayant Joshi, who is a Sane Guruji (noted Marathi social reformer Pandurang Sadashiv Sane) scholar, Abhijat was deeply influenced by Sane Guruji. His father drew his attention to the profound concept of dharma as Sane Guruji saw it. All these readings have helped him immensely in writing stories.

In 2015, he scripted Vidhu Vinod Chopra's Hollywood flick Broken Horses. As of 2016, he is working on two scripts, the third film of the Munnabhai series, and actor Sanjay Dutt's biopic.

== Personal life ==
He lives in central Ohio, where he teaches at Otterbein University in Westerville, Ohio. He is married, and has one daughter. His younger brother, Saumya Joshi, is a playwright and screenwriter best known for the 2012 film OMG - Oh My God! and 102 Not Out, both of which were directed by Umesh Shukla.

In 2016, Joshi underwent brain surgery at the Mumbai's Hinduja Hospital, performed by neurosurgeon B. K. Misra.

== Works ==
- A Shaft of Sunlight. Nick Hern Books. 2000. ISBN 1-85459-449-4. (Hindi: Marmbhed)

== Filmography ==
Year	Film	Role(s)
2023	Dunki	Co - writer
2020	Shikara	Writer
2018	Sanju	Co-writer
2016	Wazir	Writer, Co-editor
2015	Broken Horses	Writer
2014	PK	Writer
2012	Nanban	Writer (Tamil)
2009	3 Idiots	Writer
2007	Eklavya: The Royal Guard	Writer, producer
2006	Lage Raho Munna Bhai	Writer
2000	Mission Kashmir	Writer
1998	Kareeb	Writer

== Awards ==
Year	Award	Category	Film
2007	National Film Awards	Best Screenplay	Lage Raho Munna Bhai
2007	Filmfare Awards	Best Story	Lage Raho Munna Bhai
2007	Filmfare Awards	Best Dialogue	Lage Raho Munna Bhai
2010	Filmfare Awards	Best Story	3 Idiots
2010	Filmfare Awards	Best Screenplay	3 Idiots
2010	Filmfare Awards	Best Dialogue	3 Idiots
2015	Filmfare Awards	Best Screenplay	PK
2015	Filmfare Awards	Best Dialogue	PK
2007	Screen Awards	Best Story	Lage Raho Munna Bhai
2007	Screen Awards	Best Dialogue	Lage Raho Munna Bhai
2010	Screen Awards	Best Screenplay	3 Idiots
2010	Screen Awards	Best Dialogue	3 Idiots
2015	Screen Awards	Best Dialogue	PK
2007	IIFA Awards	Best Dialogue	Lage Raho Munna Bhai
2010	IIFA Awards	Best Story	3 Idiots
2010	IIFA Awards	Best Screenplay	3 Idiots
2010	IIFA Awards	Best Dialogue	3 Idiots
2015	IIFA Awards	Best Dialogue	PK
2007	Zee Cine Awards	Best Story	Lage Raho Munna Bhai
2007	Zee Cine Awards	Best Screenplay	Lage Raho Munna Bhai
2007	Zee Cine Awards	Best Dialogue	Lage Raho Munna Bhai
2007	Bollywood Movie Awards	Best Story	Lage Raho Munna Bhai
2007	Bollywood Movie Awards	Best Dialogue	Lage Raho Munna Bhai
2007	Global Indian Film Awards	Best Story	Lage Raho Munna Bhai
2007	Global Indian Film Awards	Best Dialogue	Lage Raho Munna Bhai
2015	Star Guild Awards	Best Dialogue	PK
