= IIFA Award for Best Editing =

Annual film award in India

The IIFA Best Editing is a technical award chosen ahead of the ceremonies.

== Multiple wins ==
Wins	Recipient
2	Ballu Saluja, Rajkumar Hirani, Namrata Rao, P. S. Bharati

== Awards ==
The winners are listed below:-

Year	Winner	Film
2024	Sandeep Reddy Vanga	Animal
2023	Sandeep Francis	Drishyam 2
2022	Chandrashekhar Prajapati	Sardar Udham
2020	Nitin Baid	Gully Boy
2019	Pooja Ladha Surti	Andhadhun
2018	Shweta Venkat Mathew	Newton
2017	Bodhaditya Bandyopadhyay	Pink
2016	A. Sreekar Prasad	Talvar
2015	Anurag Kashyap & Abhijit Kokate	Queen
2014	P. S. Bharati	Bhaag Milkha Bhaag
2013	Namrata Rao	Kahaani
2012	Anand Subaya	Zindagi Na Milegi Dobara
2011	Namrata Rao	Band Baaja Baaraat
2010	Rajkumar Hirani	3 Idiots
2009	Ballu Saluja	Jodhaa Akbar
2008	Amitabh Shukla	Chak De India
2007	P. S. Bharati	Rang De Basanti
2006	Bela Segal	Black
2005	Hussain Burmawala	Aitraaz
2004	Rajkumar Hirani	Munnabhai M.B.B.S.
2003	Chandan Arora	Company
2002	Ballu Saluja	Lagaan
2001	V. Sanjay Verma	Kaho Naa... Pyaar Hai
2000	V. N. Mayekar	Vaastav: The Reality

== See also ==
- IIFA Awards
