= IIFA Award for Best Sound Recording =

Annual film award in India

The IIFA Sound Recording is a technical award chosen ahead of the International Indian Film Academy Awards ceremonies.

== Multiple wins ==
Wins	Recipient
2	Satish Gupta, Jitendra Chaudhary, Resul Pookutty, Eric Pillai

== Awards ==
The winners are listed below:

Year	Winner	Film
2020	Ravi Soni	Uri: The Surgical Strike
2019	Kunal Sharma	Tumbbad
2018	Dileep Subramaniam and Ganesh Gangadharan	Tiger Zinda Hai
2017	Shadab Rayeen	Ae Dil Hai Mushkil
2016	Tanay Gajjar	Bajirao Mastani
2015	Eric Pillai	Ek Villain
2014	Vinod Verma	Chennai Express
2013	Eric Pillai	Barfi!
2012	Resul Pookutty and Amrit Pritam	Ra.One
2011	Pritam Das	Love Sex aur Dhokha
2010	Bishwadeep Chatterjee, Nihal Ranjan Samel	3 Idiots
2009	Resul Pookutty, Amrit	Ghajini
2008	Manas Choudhary; Ali Merchant	Chak De India
2007	Nakul Kamte	Rang De Basanti
2006	Anup Dev	Black
2005	Rakesh Rajan	Aitraaz
2004	Jitendra Chaudhary	Koi Mil Gaya
2003	Jitendra Chaudhary, Vikramaditya Motwane & Kunal Sharma	Devdas
2002	Vijay Benegal	Dil Chahta Hai
2001	Satish Gupta	Kaho Naa... Pyaar Hai
2000	Satish Gupta	Kachche Dhaage

== See also ==
- IIFA Awards
- Bollywood
- Cinema of India
