= IIFA Award for Best Director =

International Indian Film Academy Award

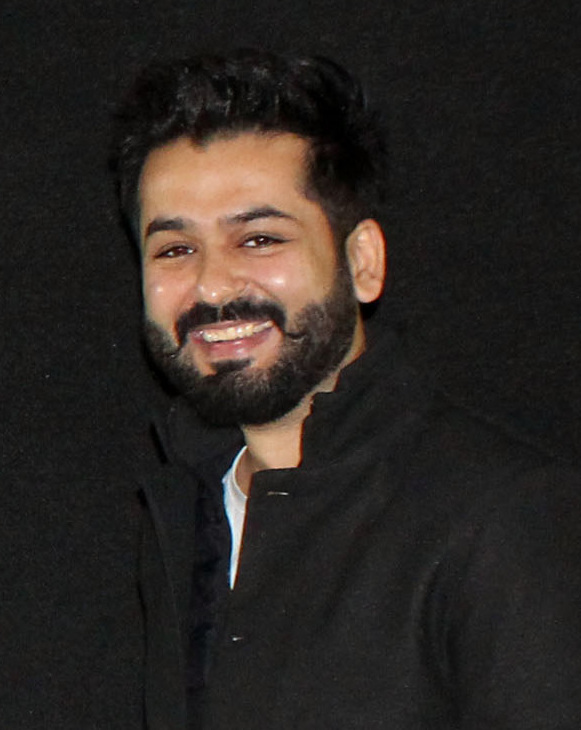
- The 2026 recipient: Aditya Dhar
- Awarded for: "Excellence in cinematic direction achievement"
- Country: India
- Presented by: International Indian Film Academy
- First award: 2000 (for direction in films released during the 1999 film season)
- Currently held by: Aditya Dhar; Dhurandhar (2026)
- Website: iifa.com

The IIFA Award for Best Director is chosen by the viewers and the winner is announced at the ceremony. The nominations for the category are given by the film fraternity. Sanjay Leela Bhansali has 4 and Rajkumar Hirani has 3 awards. Rakesh Roshan and Ashutosh Gowariker have the most wins with 2 awards.

== Multiple wins ==
Wins	Recipient
4	Sanjay Leela Bhansali
3	Rajkumar Hirani
2	Rakesh Roshan, Ashutosh Gowariker

== Awards ==
The winners are listed below:-

Year	Director	Film
2000	Sanjay Leela Bhansali	Hum Dil De Chuke Sanam
2001	Rakesh Roshan	Kaho Naa... Pyaar Hai
2002	Ashutosh Gowarikar	Lagaan
2003	Sanjay Leela Bhansali	Devdas
2004	Rakesh Roshan	Koi... Mil Gaya
2005	Yash Chopra	Veer-Zaara
2006	Sanjay Leela Bhansali	Black
2007	Rajkumar Hirani	Lage Raho Munna Bhai
2008	Shimit Amin	Chak De India
2009	Ashutosh Gowarikar	Jodhaa Akbar
2010	Rajkumar Hirani	3 Idiots
2011	Karan Johar	My Name Is Khan
2012	Zoya Akhtar	Zindagi Na Milegi Dobara
2013	Anurag Basu	Barfi!
2014	Rakeysh Omprakash Mehra	Bhaag Milkha Bhaag
2015	Rajkumar Hirani	PK
2016	Sanjay Leela Bhansali	Bajirao Mastani
2017	Aniruddha Roy Chowdhury	Pink
2018	Saket Chaudhary	Hindi Medium
2019	Sriram Raghavan	Andhadhun
2020	Aditya Dhar	Uri: The Surgical Strike
2021	AWARDS NOT HELD DUE TO COVID-19 PANDEMIC
2022	Vishnuvardhan	Shershaah
2023	R. Madhavan	Rocketry: The Nambi Effect
2024	Vidhu Vinod Chopra	12th Fail
2025	Kiran Rao	Laapataa Ladies
2026	Aditya Dhar	Dhurandhar

== See also ==
- IIFA Awards
- Bollywood
- Cinema of India
