= IIFA Award for Best Dialogue =

Annual film award in India

The IIFA Best Dialogue is chosen by the viewers and the winner is announced at the ceremony.

Rajkumar Hirani and Abhijat Joshi hold the record for maximum wins with three awards followed by Vishal Bhardwaj and Juhi Chaturvedi with two.

== Multiple wins ==
Wins	Recipient
3	Rajkumar Hirani & Abhijat Joshi
2	Vishal Bhardwaj, Juhi Chaturvedi

== Awards ==
The winners are listed below:

Year	Winner	Film
2024	Ishita Moitra	Rocky Aur Rani Kii Prem Kahaani
2023	Utkarshini Vashishtha, Prakash Kapadia	Gangubai Kathiawadi
2022	Anubhav Sinha, Mrunmayee Lagoo Waikul	Thappad
2020	Vijay Maurya	Gully Boy
2019	Akshat Ghildial	Badhaai Ho
2018	Hitesh Kewalya	Shubh Mangal Saavdhan
2017	Ritesh Shah	Pink
2016	Juhi Chaturvedi	Piku
2015	Rajkumar Hirani & Abhijat Joshi	PK
2014	Prakash Joshi	Bhaag Milkha Bhaag
2013	Zeishan Quadri, Akhilesh, Sachin Ladia & Anurag Kashyap	Gangs of Wasseypur – Part 1
2013	Juhi Chaturvedi	Vicky Donor (tie)
2012	Rajat Arora	The Dirty Picture
2011	Vishal Bhardwaj	Ishqiya
2010	Rajkumar Hirani & Abhijat Joshi	3 Idiots
2009	Manu Rishi	Oye Lucky! Lucky Oye!
2008	Imtiaz Ali	Jab We Met
2007	Rajkumar Hirani & Abhijat Joshi	Lage Raho Munna Bhai
2006	Prakash Jha	Apharan
2005	Vishal Bhardwaj	Maqbool
2004	Abbas Tyrewala	Munnabhai M.B.B.S.
2003	Prakash Kapadia	Devdas
2002	Karan Johar; Shaktiman	Kabhi Khushi Kabhie Gham; Gadar: Ek Prem Katha
2001	O. P. Dutta	Refugee
2000	Amrik Gill	Hum Dil De Chuke Sanam

== See also ==
- IIFA Awards
- Bollywood
- Cinema of India
