= International Indian Film Academy Awards =

Annual awards ceremony

IIFA Awards
- Current: 26th IIFA Awards
- The IIFA Trophy
- Awarded for: Excellence in cinematic achievements for Hindi cinema
- Country: India
- Presented by: International Indian Film Academy
- First award: 2000
- Final award: 2026
- Website: iifa.com

Television/radio coverage
- Network: Sony TV (2000–04); STAR Plus (2005–14); Colors TV (2015–23); Zee TV (2024–)
- Produced by: Wizcraft International

The International Indian Film Academy Awards (IIFA Awards) is an annual awards ceremony for Hindi cinema. Produced by Wizcraft International Entertainment Pvt. Ltd, the winners of the awards are decided by fans, who vote online for their favourite actors from the Indian Hindi film industry. Instituted in 2000, the ceremony is held in different countries around the world every year.

== History ==
The first awards were presented in 2000 at The Millennium Dome in London, United Kingdom. From then onwards, the awards have been held at locations around the world, signifying the international success of Hindi cinema. Since 2000, the event has expanded from a one-night event to a three-day celebration, hosting various events and activities relating to the Indian film industry.

These awards honour films from the previous calendar year. Salman Khan has been the Brand Ambassador of the IIFA since its inception in 2000. In 2009, five special awards were introduced: Star of the Decade (Male and Female), Movie of the Decade, Music of the Decade, and Director of the Decade.

== Awards ceremonies ==
The following is a listing of all International Indian Film Academy Awards ceremonies since 2000.

Ceremony	Date	Best Film	Host(s)	Venue	City, Country
1st	24 June 2000	Hum Dil De Chuke Sanam	Yukta Mookhey; Anupam Kher	Millennium Dome	London, United Kingdom
2nd	16 June 2001	Kaho Naa... Pyaar Hai	Priyanka Chopra; Kabir Bedi	Superbowl Arena	Sun City, South Africa
3rd	6 April 2002	Lagaan	Lara Dutta	Arena of Stars	Genting Highlands, Malaysia
4th	17 May 2003	Devdas	Anil Kapoor; Dia Mirza	Coca-Cola Dome	Johannesburg, South Africa
5th	22 May 2004	Kal Ho Naa Ho	Rahul Khanna	Singapore Indoor Stadium	Singapore, Singapore
6th	11 June 2005	Veer-Zaara	Shahrukh Khan; Fardeen Khan; Karan Johar	Amsterdam Arena	Amsterdam, Netherlands
7th	17 June 2006	Black	Fardeen Khan; Lara Dutta	Dubai International Convention Centre	Dubai, United Arab Emirates
8th	9 June 2007	Rang De Basanti	Boman Irani; Lara Dutta	Hallam FM Arena	Sheffield, United Kingdom
9th	8 June 2008	Chak De! India	Boman Irani; Ritesh Deshmukh	Siam Paragon	Bangkok, Thailand
10th	13 June 2009	Jodhaa Akbar	Boman Irani; Ritesh Deshmukh; Lara Dutta	The Venetian Macao	Macau, Macau
11th	5 June 2010	3 Idiots	Boman Irani; Ritesh Deshmukh; Lara Dutta	Sugathadasa Stadium	Colombo, Sri Lanka
12th	25 June 2011	Dabangg	Boman Irani; Ritesh Deshmukh	Rogers Centre	Toronto, Canada
13th	9 June 2012	Zindagi Na Milegi Dobara	Shahid Kapoor; Farhan Akhtar	Singapore Indoor Stadium	Singapore, Singapore
14th	6 July 2013	Barfi!	Salman Khan; Akshay Kumar	The Venetian Macao	Macau, Macau
15th	26 April 2014	Bhaag Milkha Bhaag	Shahid Kapoor; Farhan Akhtar	Raymond James Stadium	Tampa, United States
16th	7 June 2015	Queen	Arjun Kapoor; Ranveer Singh	Putra Indoor Stadium	Kuala Lumpur, Malaysia
17th	25 June 2016	Bajrangi Bhaijaan	Shahid Kapoor; Farhan Akhtar	IFEMA	Madrid, Spain
18th	14–15 July 2017	Neerja	Karan Johar Saif Ali Khan	MetLife Stadium	New Jersey, United States
19th	22–24 June 2018	Tumhari Sulu	Karan Johar; Riteish Deshmukh	Siam Niramit Theatre	Bangkok, Thailand
20th	18 September 2019	Raazi	Ayushmann Khurrana; Aparshakti Khurana	Sardar Vallabhbhai Patel Indoor Stadium	Mumbai, India
21st	24 November 2021	Kabir Singh	The ceremony was cancelled due to COVID-19 pandemic. The winners were announced through IIFA's social media handle.		
22nd	2–4 June 2022	Shershaah	Salman Khan; Riteish Deshmukh; Maniesh Paul	Etihad Arena	Abu Dhabi, United Arab Emirates
23rd	26–27 May 2023	Drishyam 2	Vicky Kaushal; Abhishek Bachchan	Etihad Arena	Abu Dhabi, United Arab Emirates
24th	28 September 2024	Animal	Shah Rukh Khan; Karan Johar; Vicky Kaushal	Etihad Arena	Abu Dhabi, United Arab Emirates
25th	8–9 March 2025	Laapataa Ladies	Karan Johar, Kartik Aaryan	Jaipur Exhibition & Convention Centre	Jaipur, India
26th	30 October 2026	Dhurandhar	The ceremony wasn't held. The winners were announced through IIFA's social media handle.		

== Categories ==
=== Popular awards ===
- Best Film
- Best Director
- Best Actor
- Best Actress
- Best Supporting Actor
- Best Supporting Actress
- Best Performance in a Negative Role
  (2000–2017, 2024–present)
- Best Performance in a Comic Role
  (2000–2017)
- Star Debut of the Year – Male
- Star Debut of the Year – Female
- Best Music Director
- Best Lyricist
- Best Playback Singer Male
- Best Playback Singer Female
- Best Story

=== Special awards ===
- IIFA Lifetime Achievement Award
- Style Icon
- Style Diva
- Most Glamorous Star of the Year
- Best On-Screen Beauty
- Contribution to a Greener Earth
- Face of the Year
- Entertainer of the Year
- Special Award for Global Impact
- Outstanding Contribution to Indian cinema
- Outstanding Achievement in Indian cinema
- Outstanding Achievement by an Indian in International Cinema
- Artists of the Decade

=== Technical awards ===
- Best Art Direction (2000–2017)
- Best Action (2000–2017)
- Best Background Score
- Best Cinematography
- Best Choreography
- Best Costume Design (2000–2017)
- Best Dialogue
- Best Editing
- Best Sound Design
- Best Makeup (2000–2017)
- Best Screenplay
- Best Song Recording (2000–2017)
- Best Sound Recording
- Best Sound Re-Recording
- Best Special Effects

== Records and facts ==
- Most awards to a single film
  - 3 Idiots (2009) – 16
  - Devdas (2002) – 16
  - Kal Ho Naa Ho (2003) – 14
  - Barfi! (2012) – 14
  - Bhaag Milkha Bhaag (2013) – 14
- Most acting awards – male (Best Actor + Best Supporting Actor)
  - Hrithik Roshan (5+0) = 5
  - Shahrukh Khan (5+0) = 5
- Most acting awards – female (Best Actress + Best Supporting Actress)
  - Rani Mukerji (4+1) = 5
  - Alia Bhatt (4+0) = 4
- Most directing awards
  - Sanjay Leela Bhansali = 4
- Most music awards (Best Music Director + Best Background Score)
  - A. R. Rahman (8+6) = 14
  - Pritam (4+3) = 7
- Most singing awards
  - Shreya Ghoshal = 11
  - Arijit Singh = 5
  - Sonu Nigam = 4

== See also ==
- IIFA Utsavam
- Bollywood
- Cinema of India
