= IIFA Award for Best Screenplay =

Award for best screenplay in Indian cinema

The IIFA Award for Best Screenplay is a technical award chosen ahead of the ceremonies.

== Multiple wins ==
Wins	Recipient
3	Vidhu Vinod Chopra
2	Rajkumar Hirani

== Awards ==
The winners are listed below:-

Year	Winner	Film
2024	Vidhu Vinod Chopra, Jaskunwar Kohli, Anurag Pathak, Aayush Saxena, Vikas Divyakirti	12th Fail
2023	Sanjay Leela Bhansali, Utkarshini Vashishtha	Gangubai Kathiawadi
2022	Sandeep Shrivastava	Shershaah
2020	Anubhav Sinha & Gaurav Solanki	Article 15
2019	Sriram Raghavan, Hemanth Rao, Arijit Biswas, Pooja Ladha Surti & Yogesh Chandekar	Andhadhun
2018	Nitesh Tiwari, Shreyas Jain	Bareilly Ki Barfi
2017	Ritesh Shah	Pink
2016	Kabir Khan and Parveez Shaikh	Bajrangi Bhaijaan
2015	Vikas Bahl, Chaitally Parmar & Parveez Shaikh	Queen
2014	Prasoon Joshi	Bhaag Milkha Bhaag
2013	Anurag Basu and Tani Basu	Barfi!
2012	Reema Kagti and Zoya Akhtar	Zindagi Na Milegi Dobara
2011	Abhinav Kashyap and Dilip Shukla	Dabangg
2010	Abhijat Joshi, Rajkumar Hirani & Vidhu Vinod Chopra	3 Idiots
2009	Neeraj Pandey	A Wednesday!
2008	Anurag Basu; Jaideep Sahni	Life in a... Metro; Chak De India
2007	Rensil D'Silva and Rakeysh Omprakash Mehra	Rang De Basanti
2006	Pradeep Sarkar and Vidhu Vinod Chopra	Parineeta
2005	Abbas Tyrewala and Vishal Bhardwaj	Maqbool
2004	Rajkumar Hirani, Vidhu Vinod Chopra and Lajan Joseph	Munnabhai M.B.B.S.
2003	Mahesh Bhatt	Raaz
2002	Farhan Akhtar	Dil Chahta Hai
2001	Honey Irani and Farhan Akhtar	Kya Kehna
2000	Sanjay Leela Bhansali	Hum Dil De Chuke Sanam

== See also ==
- IIFA Awards
- Bollywood
- Cinema of India
