= IIFA Award for Best Story =

Annual film award in India

- Awarded for: Best Performance by a Story writer
- Country: India
- Presented by: International Indian Film Academy
- First award: Sanjay Leela Bhansali & Pratap Karvat; Hum Dil De Chuke Sanam (2000)
- Currently held by: Reema Kagti & Zoya Akhtar; Gully Boy (2020)
- Website: http://www.iifa.com

The IIFA Award for Best Story is chosen by the viewers and the winner is announced at the ceremony.

Since the 22nd IIFA Awards in 2022, the category has been split into Best Story (Original) and Best Story (Adapted).

== Multiple wins ==
Wins	Recipient
2	Aditya Chopra, Jaideep Sahni, Rajkumar Hirani, Zoya Akhtar & Reema Kagti

== Best Story (2000–20) ==
The winners are listed below:

Year	Winner	Film
2000	Pratap Karvat and Sanjay Leela Bhansali	Hum Dil De Chuke Sanam
2001	Aditya Chopra	Mohabbatein
2002	Ashutosh Gowariker	Lagaan
2003	Jaideep Sahni	Company
2004	Karan Johar	Kal Ho Naa Ho
2005	Aditya Chopra	Veer-Zaara
2006	Nagesh Kukunoor	Iqbal
2007	Rajkumar Hirani	Lage Raho Munna Bhai
2008	Jaideep Sahni	Chak De India
2009	Neeraj Pandey	A Wednesday!
2010	Rajkumar Hirani, Abhijat Joshi and Vidhu Vinod Chopra	3 Idiots
2011	Shibani Bathija	My Name is Khan
2012	Zoya Akhtar & Reema Kagti	Zindagi Na Milegi Dobara
2013	Anurag Basu and Tani Basu	Barfi!
2014	Prasoon Joshi	Bhaag Milkha Bhaag
2015	Vikas Bahl, Chaitally Parmar, Parveez Shaikh	Queen
2016	Juhi Chaturvedi	Piku
2017	Ayesha Devitre, Shakun Batra	Kapoor & Sons
2018	Amit V. Masurkar	Newton
2019	Sriram Raghavan, Arijit Biswas, Pooja Ladha Surti, Yogesh Chandekar, Hemanth Rao	Andhadhun
2020	Zoya Akhtar & Reema Kagti	Gully Boy

== Best Story (Original) (2022–present) ==
Year	Winner	Film
2022	Anurag Basu	Ludo
2023	Jasmeet K Reen, Parveez Sheikh	Darlings
2024	Ishita Moitra, Shashank Khaitan, Sumit Roy	Rocky Aur Rani Kii Prem Kahaani
2025	Biplab Goswami	Laapataa Ladies

== Best Story (Adapted) (2022–present) ==
Year	Winner	Film
2022	Kabir Khan, Sanjay Puran Singh Chauhan, Vasan Bala	83
2023	Aamil Keeyan Khan, Abhishek Pathak	Drishyam 2
2024	Vidhu Vinod Chopra, Jaskunwar Kohli	12th Fail
2025	Sriram Raghavan, Arijit Biswas, Pooja Ladha Surti, Anukriti Pandey	Merry Christmas

== See also ==
- IIFA Awards
- Bollywood
- Cinema of India
