= Rajkumar Hirani =

Indian filmmaker (born 1962)

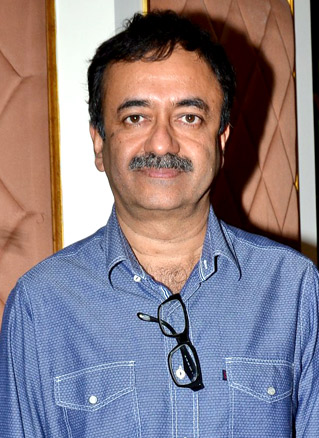
- Hirani in 2014
- Born: 20 November 1962 (age 63); Nagpur, Maharashtra, India
- Other name: Raju
- Education: Film and Television Institute of India
- Occupations: Film director; film producer; screenwriter; film editor; film distributor
- Years active: 1991–present
- Spouse: Manjeet Hirani
- Children: Vir Hirani
- Awards: Full list

Rajkumar "Raju" Hirani (born 20 November 1962) is an Indian filmmaker known for his works in Hindi films. Hirani's films have won several accolades, including four National Film Awards and 11 Filmfare Awards. A prolific director of Hindi cinema, his movies are often lighthearted but revolve around significant societal issues with humour and emotional intelligence.

Starting his career as a film editor and ad films, where he made several successful ads. His first film as a professional editor was Vidhu Vinod Chopra's action drama Mission Kashmir (2000). His first directorial, a comedy-drama Munna Bhai M.B.B.S. was released in 2003, produced by Chopra. Upon release, the film emerged a widespread critical and commercial success It won Filmfare Award for Best Film (Critics) and earned Hirani the Filmfare Award for Best Screenplay and his first nomination for the Filmfare Award for Best Director. making them the most awarded duo in this category. After the success of MBBS, he helmed its sequel Lage Raho Munna Bhai (2006), which emerged as the second-highest grosser of the year. Both won the National Film Award for Best Popular Film Providing Wholesome Entertainment.

Hirani's next coming-of-age comedy-drama 3 Idiots (2009) released with widespread critical acclaim and emerged as the highest grossing Indian film of its time, winning the several accolades. His religious satire PK (2014) again emerged as the highest-grossing Indian film of its time and the biographical drama Sanju (2018) based on the life of actor Sanjay Dutt released to commercial success. He is the founder of the production house Rajkumar Hirani Films. His latest film Dunki, starring Shah Rukh Khan was released theatrically on 21 December 2023 with mixed reviews.

== Early life and education ==
Hirani was born on 20 November 1962 in Nagpur to a Sindhi Hindu family. His ancestors originally belonged to Mehrabpur, a city now in the Naushahro Firoz District, Sindh, of Pakistan. His father Suresh Hirani ran a typing institute in Nagpur. Hirani studied at St. Francis De'Sales High School, Nagpur, Maharashtra. He did his graduation in commerce. His parents wanted him to be an engineer, but he was more keen on theatre and film.

In his college days, he was involved with Hindi theatre. He had many friends in Nagpur's medical college and hence, spent much time in theatre at the college. Suresh had his son's photographs taken and sent him to an acting school in Mumbai. However, Hirani could not fit in and returned to Nagpur after three days. His father then asked him to apply to the Film and Television Institute of India in Pune, but the acting course had shut down and his chances of admission to the directorial course looked slim as there were far too many applicants. Hirani opted for the film editing course, and earned a scholarship.

At a public event in 2025, Hirani described himself as a "huge fan" of filmmaker Satyajit Ray, recalling that during his time in film school he would spend "weeks and months" watching Ray's films to study his craft and storytelling.

== Career ==
=== Early work (1994–2000) ===
Hirani tried his luck as a film editor for many years. Bad experiences forced him to shift to television advertising, and he gradually established himself as a director and producer of advertising films. He was also seen in a Fevicol ad where some men and elephants were trying to pull and break a Fevicol plank, saying "Jor laga ke Haisha". He was also seen in the Kinetic Luna ad campaign created by Ogilvy & Mather.

He was doing fairly well in the advertising industry, but he wanted to make movies, so he took a break from advertisement and started working with Vidhu Vinod Chopra. He worked on promos and trailers for Chopra's patriotic romance 1942: A Love Story (1994). He edited promotions for Chopra's romance Kareeb (1998). He got his first opportunity as a film editor with Chopra's action drama Mission Kashmir (2000).

=== Directorial debut and breakthrough (2003–09) ===
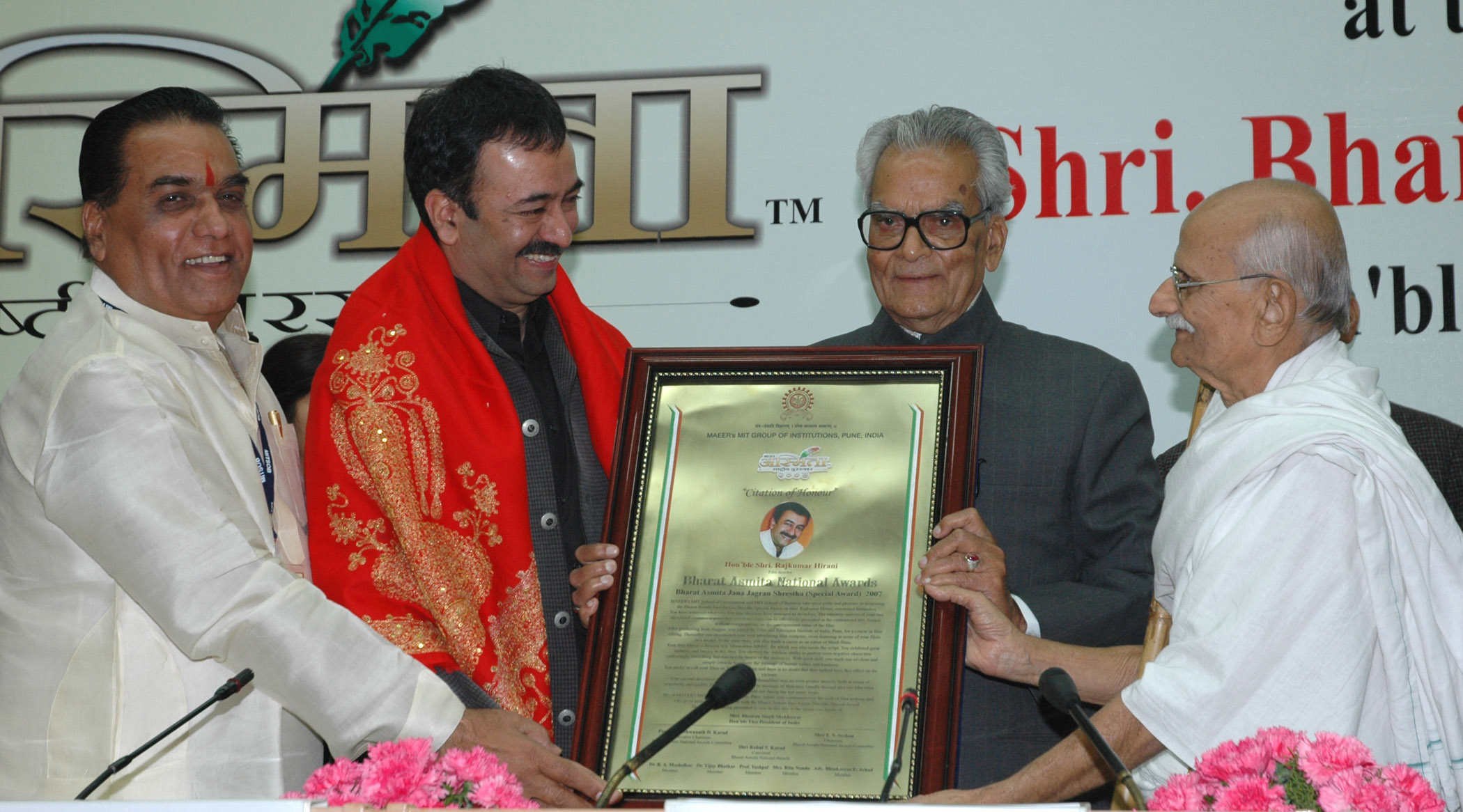
Hirani winning the Bharat Asmita National Award in 2007

Hirani made his directorial debut with the comedy-drama Munna Bhai M.B.B.S. (2003) starring Sanjay Dutt, Arshad Warsi, Boman Irani, Gracy Singh, Jimmy Sheirgill and Sunil Dutt in lead roles. The first film of the Munna Bhai film series, it revolved around the titular protagonist (played by Dutt), a goon going to a medical school who is helped by his sidekick, Circuit (played by Warsi). The film received positive reviews from critics upon release, with particular praise for Hirani's direction and screenplay. It emerged as a commercial success at the box-office, with a worldwide total of ₹330 million (US$3.4 million), ranking as the eighth highest-grossing Hindi film of the year. Munna Bhai M.B.B.S. won the National Film Award for Best Popular Film Providing Wholesome Entertainment and the Filmfare Award for Best Film (Critics), and earned Hirani his first Filmfare Award for Best Screenplay and his first nomination for Best Director.

In 2006, Hirani directed the second installment of the Munna Bhai franchise, titled Lage Raho Munna Bhai, which retained some of the original cast, including Sanjay Dutt, Warsi, and Boman Irani, and added Vidya Balan as the female lead replacing Gracy Singh. The film proved to be Hirani's highest-grossing release to that point, grossing ₹1.2 billion (US$12 million) worldwide, ranking as the third highest-grossing film of the year. Just like the previous instalment, it won Hirani his second National Film Award for Best Popular Film Providing Wholesome Entertainment, his second Filmfare Award for Best Film (Critics), his first Filmfare Award for Best Story and Best Dialogue, and his second nomination for Best Director. Despite enduring anticipation for a third instalment in the Munna Bhai film series, Munna Bhai 3 remains on hold as of early 2026. The long-awaited sequel, originally expected to reunite director Rajkumar Hirani with Sanjay Dutt and Arshad Warsi, has seen significant development delays, with Hirani continuing to refine the script rather than rush into production. In a January 2026 interview, actor Boman Irani—who portrayed Dr. J. C. Asthana in the franchise—spoke at the song launch event of the pan-Indian film The Raja Saab, suggesting that while Munna Bhai 3 has not begun filming, he remains hopeful that it will eventually materialise when the "story is right" and encouraged fans to urge Hirani to pursue the project. Recent comments from cast members also note Hirani's ongoing efforts on the script, indicating that although the sequel is still in limbo, creative work continues behind the scenes.

=== Widespread success (2009–present) ===
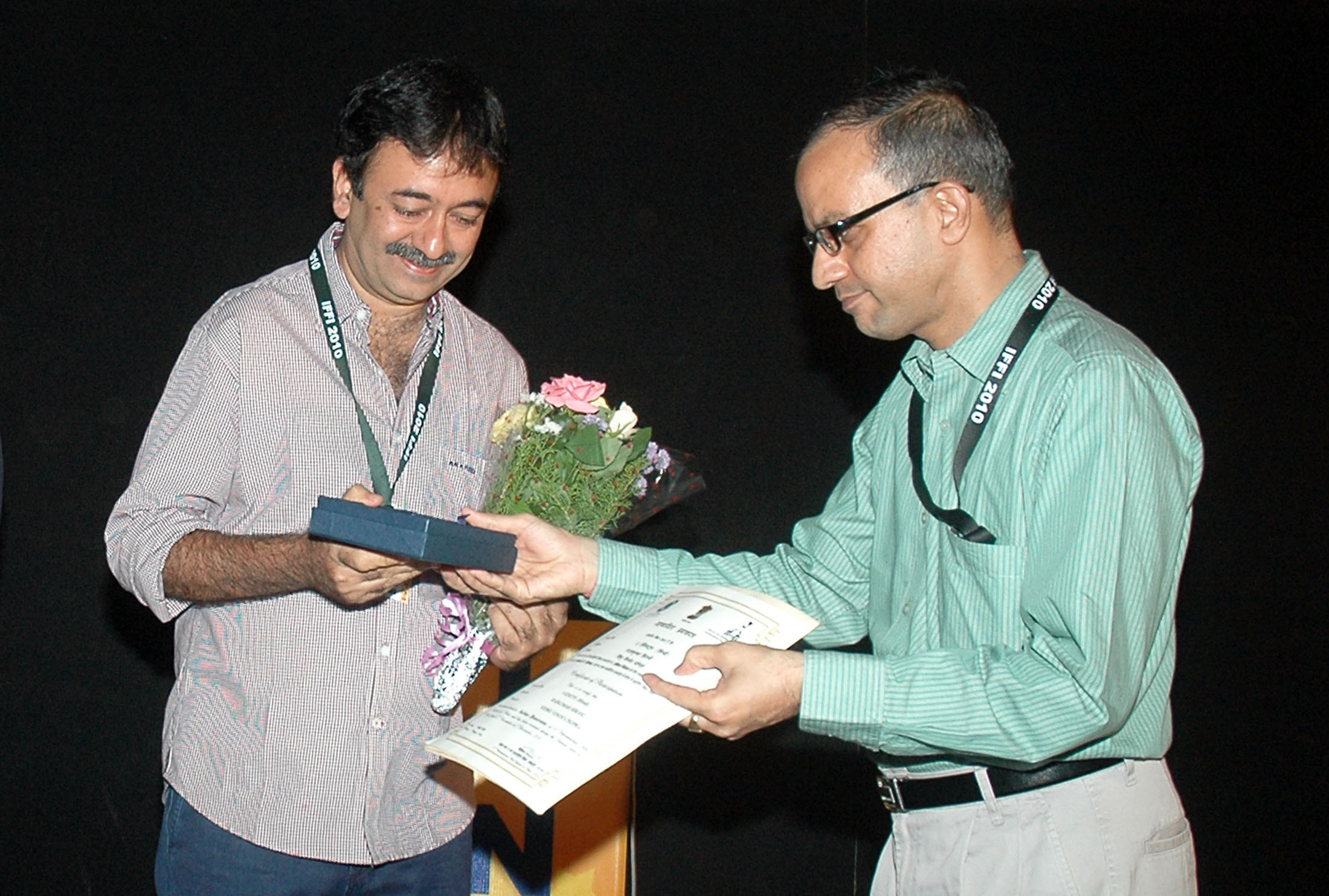
Hirani at the 41st International Film Festival in 2010

Hirani's next directorial venture was the coming-of-age comedy-drama 3 Idiots (2009), loosely adapted from the novel Five Point Someone by Chetan Bhagat. Starring an ensemble cast of Aamir Khan, Kareena Kapoor Khan, R. Madhavan, Sharman Joshi, and Boman Irani, it follows the friendship of three engineering students, and was a satire about social pressures under an Indian education system. 3 Idiots received widespread critical acclaim upon release, and emerged as the highest-grossing Indian film up until then, earning ₹4.60 billion (US$48 million) in global ticket sales. Hirani won his third National Film Award for Best Popular Film Providing Wholesome Entertainment, his first Filmfare Award for Best Film and Best Director, and his second Filmfare Award for Best Story and Best Screenplay. 3 Idiots established Hirani as one of Hindi cinema's most prominent filmmakers. The film's lasting popularity has also led to recurring media reports about a potential sequel. However, actors Aamir Khan and R. Madhavan later clarified that no concrete discussions or plans had been made with Rajkumar Hirani regarding a continuation of the 3 Idiots story.

After a 5-year hiatus, Hirani returned to direction with the science fiction satirical comedy drama PK (2014). Upon release, the film received positive reviews, with praise directed towards Aamir Khan's performance and the film's humour, though certain criticism was received for "hurting religious sentiments". It received 8 nominations at the 60th Filmfare Awards, winning two. Additionally, it won five Producers Guild Film Awards, and two Screen Awards. PK garnered the Telstra People's Choice Award at the Indian Film Festival of Melbourne. Produced on a budget of ₹850 million (approx. $12 million), PK was the first Indian film to gross more than ₹7 billion and US$100 million worldwide. Both Amir and Rajkumar Hirani was not sure about the film success at the box office. At the time, it emerged as the highest-grossing Indian film of all time and ranks as the 70th highest-grossing film of 2014 worldwide. The film's final worldwide gross was ₹854 crore (US$140 million). It currently stands as the 5th highest-grossing Indian film worldwide and 7th highest-grossing film in India.

In 2015, Hirani was invited to head the Academic Council of the Film and Television Institute of India (FTII), but declined the offer, citing prior film commitments.

He also directed the biographical drama Sanju (2018). The film follows the life of actor Sanjay Dutt (one of Hirani's closest collaborators), his addiction to drugs, arrest for alleged association with the 1993 Bombay bombings, relationship with his father, comeback in the industry, the eventual drop of charges from Bombay blasts, and release after completing his jail term. Upon release, it received generally positive reviews from critics and was praised for Ranbir Kapoor's performance; some criticised its image-cleansing of its protagonist. With a worldwide gross of ₹586.85 crore (US$61 million), Sanju ranks as the highest grossing Hindi film of 2018, the fifth highest-earning Hindi film in India of all time, and one of the highest-grossing Indian films. Sanju earned seven nominations at the 64th Filmfare Awards, including Best Film and Best Director for Hirani. It won two; Best Actor for Kapoor (who played Dutt) and Best Supporting Actor for Kaushal.

In June 2019, Hirani was invited to serve on the international jury of the Shanghai International Film Festival, representing Indian cinema at the prestigious event.

In 2023, Hirani took on the role of lead creative mentor for the content ideas platform The Sourrce, aimed at fostering new storytelling talent and original concepts in Indian cinema.

Hirani directed Dunki (2023), a comedy-drama film on immigration produced by himself and Red Chillies Entertainment (with whom he is working with for the first time) and written by him and Joshi. There was quite funny incident behind this movie name "Dunki", eventually Hirani got the rights and gave a successful box office hit film.

In a 2024 interview, Hirani shared that he was developing a new project and expressed his interest in collaborating with actor Vijay Varma, whom he praised as "a fantastic actor," adding that the script was in the writing stage.

Hirani, along with his longtime collaborator Abhijat Joshi, holds the record for winning the IIFA Award for Best Dialogue three times—the most by any writing duo—underscoring the enduring impact of their writing on mainstream Hindi cinema.

In 2025, Rajkumar Hirani began work on his first long-form digital series, marking his debut as a showrunner in the OTT space. The project, tentatively titled Trojan, is being produced for Disney+ Hotstar and stars Vikrant Massey and Arshad Warsi in lead roles. Mona Singh Confirms Role in Rajkumar Hirani's OTT Debut Alongside Vikrant Massey. The series blends elements of crime drama and comedy, focusing on two police officers with contrasting personalities—one traditional (Warsi) and one tech-savvy (Massey)—who must work together to solve cases. The storyline is set against the backdrop of cybercrime and explores themes of friendship, in line with Hirani's signature style. Hirani is also scripting his next feature film with Vicky Kaushal, which is expected to begin production in 2026 after the actor completes his current commitments.

Hirani is also developing a biopic on Indian cricket legend Lala Amarnath, with Aamir Khan and Ranbir Kapoor reportedly considered for the lead. The film will depict Amarnath's journey as India's first post-independence Test captain. As of 2025, Hirani has also expressed serious intent to revive the Munna Bhai franchise, with several unfinished scripts in hand and Sanjay Dutt keen to return. Although no formal timeline has been announced, he is actively working on developing a story that lives up to the popularity of its predecessors

In addition to his directorial ventures, Hirani is also committed to nurturing emerging talent in Indian cinema. As part of the Newcomers initiative—launched in collaboration with Jio Studios and producer Mahaveer Jain—Rajkumar Hirani Films is actively involved in creating opportunities for aspiring actors, writers, directors from across the country. The initiative is positioned as a talent discovery platform aimed at democratizing access to the film industry and supporting fresh voices in storytelling.

== Filmmaking ==
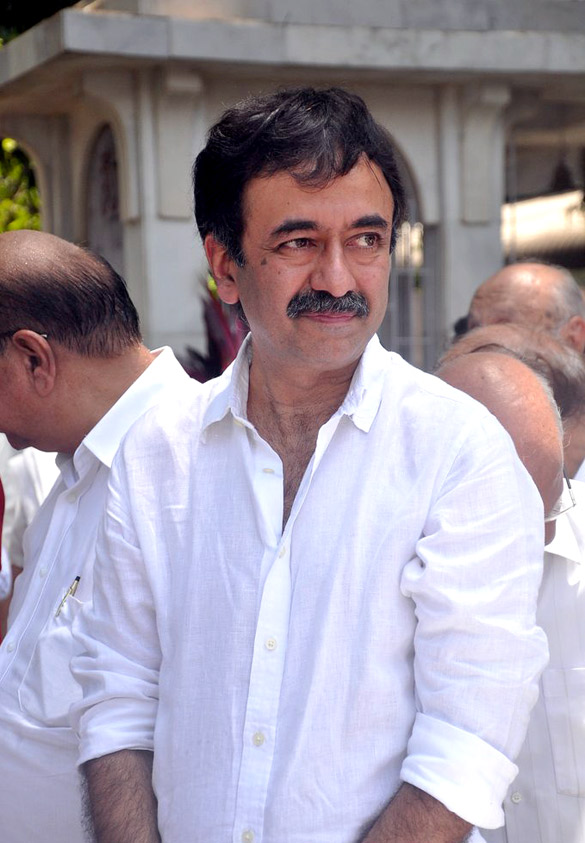
Hirani in 2012

Hirani's films are often based on critical social issues like middle-class aspirations, self-conviction and relationships, with healthy humour. Hirani is the editor of all of his films; he has himself admitted that he enjoys editing films more than anything else. Rajeev Masand wrote, in a review, "[L]ike those good old-fashioned Hrishikesh Mukherjee films, [Rajkumar] Hirani's film reinforced importance of human goodness and basic niceties". Hirani cites Mukherjee's Anand (1971) as his favourite film.

Munna Bhai MBBS (2003) deals with the corruption of hospitals and the cruelty of doctors, Lage Raho Munna Bhai (2006) deals with Gandhi's thinking and reforming people with soft-hearted behaviour, 3 Idiots (2009) with the education system, pressure on students for marks and passion of individuals, PK (2014) with religion and superstition and Sanju (2018) with relationships and media outrage. Film critic Komal Nahta called Hirani "a magician more than a director" while reviewing Sanju, adding that he "narrates the complex story of a misdirected, ignorant, and foolish young man with such sensitivity that the human drama becomes quite a masterpiece of a film."

I believe in God and I believe in religion. But I am against any religion that instills fear. God is misused by many who wish to mint money by scaring people. I believe in the great Hindu principle: 'Vasudhaiva Kutumbakam' - the whole world is a family. Hinduism, Islam, Christianity, and indeed all religions, teach us brotherhood and love.

— Hirani on religion during PK controversies.

All of Hirani's films were co-produced by Vinod Chopra Films till Sanju, after which they broke their ties owing to creative differences. He had edited one of Chopra's films Mission Kashmir (2000) professionally. Hirani has worked consistently with writer Abhijat Joshi since Lage Raho Munna Bhai, and has often cast the same actors in his projects, particularly Sanjay Dutt, who has collaborated with Hirani on three feature films and one film which itself is based on Dutt. Aamir Khan has collaborated on two films with Hirani, one also starring Dutt. Boman Irani has featured in all of Hirani's films in pivotal supporting roles.

Hirani has garnered appraisal from several industry's successful makers and his contemporaries like Karan Johar who said,

I've been pitted against everyone and I feel envious, not jealous. I am envious of Rajkumar Hirani. I've never managed to do what he does. His movies have genius ideas. I don't have the ability perhaps. I would love to make those kinds of movies. He has strong screenplays. I hope I get such screenplays.

Anurag Kashyap called him the bravest filmmaker, he added: Generally, we filmmakers get into our subject to prove its poignancy so much that we end up making it less effective for the audience. But Raju didn't do that. SS Rajamouli said during the promotion of Baahubali: The Beginning (2015) that he is a huge fan of Hirani's films and that he "cannot make one scene the way [Rajkumar] Hirani does". Screenwriter Javed Akhtar praised Hirani's work saying,

"I am a huge admirer of Rajkumar Hirani. He does really good work and now again, he has done an amazing job. I always say one thing about him, that to make such kind of films, you not only have to be a really good director or writer, you have to be really a good human being as well.

According to Hirani, this principle helps ensure consistent emotional engagement throughout his films.

Hirani has often emphasized that his storytelling sensibilities are rooted in everyday life, remarking in an interview that he "strongly believes stories come from small towns," reflecting his preference for narratives grounded in relatable, real-world experiences.

In an October 2025 discussion on the social impact of films, Hirani stated that "cinema shouldn't bear the burden of fixing morality," emphasizing that a filmmaker's primary responsibility is to tell engaging stories rather than to enforce moral codes.

== Personal life ==
Hirani married Manjeet Hirani, a pilot in Air India, in 1994. They have a son, Vir Hirani, who is also pursuing filmmaking.

Rajkumar Hirani has a brother, Sanjeev Hirani, who works as a computer consultant in the United States and a sister, Anju Kishanchandani, who is a journalist. Hirani later produced her play Growing Up, which addressed themes of adolescence and was written by Kishanchandani.

Vir Hirani made his acting debut with Pritam and Pedro

== Filmography ==
=== Films ===
| Year | Title | Director | Writer | Editor | Producer | Notes |
|---|---|---|---|---|---|---|
| 1991 | Jab Pyar Kiya to Darna Kya | No | No | Yes | No | |
| 1994 | Jazbaat | No | No | Yes | No | |
| 2000 | Mission Kashmir | No | No | Yes | No | |
| 2001 | Tere Liye | No | No | Yes | No | |
| 2003 | Munna Bhai M.B.B.S. | Yes | Yes | Yes | No | |
| 2005 | Parineeta | No | No | No | Creative | |
| 2006 | Lage Raho Munna Bhai | Yes | Yes | Yes | No | |
| 2007 | Eklavya: The Royal Guard | No | No | No | Creative | |
| 2009 | 3 Idiots | Yes | Yes | Yes | No | |
| 2012 | Ferrari Ki Sawaari | No | Dialogues | Yes | Creative | |
| 2014 | PK | Yes | Yes | Yes | Yes | |
| 2016 | Saala Khadoos | No | No | No | Yes | |
| 2018 | Sanju | Yes | Yes | Yes | Yes | |
| 2023 | Dunki | Yes | Yes | Yes | Yes | |

=== Television Shows ===
| Year | Title | Director | Creator | Writer | Editor | Producer | Notes |
|---|---|---|---|---|---|---|---|
| 2026 | Pritam and Pedro | No | Yes | Yes | Yes | Yes | JioHotstar series |

== Box office ==
The budgets and box-office figures are all estimates collated from various sources with reputed film portals. All values in Indian Rupees (₹) are converted to US Dollars ($) based on the average yearly exchange rate data from World Bank.

List of budget and box office receipts
| Year | Title | Budget (est.) | Box-office (est.) | Ref. |
Worldwide Gross
| 2003 | Munna Bhai MBBS | ₹10 crore (US$1.0 million) | ₹56.28 crore (US$5.8 million) | |
| 2006 | Lage Raho Munna Bhai | ₹19 crore (US$2.0 million) | ₹126 crore (US$13 million) | |
| 2009 | 3 Idiots | ₹55 crore (US$5.7 million) | ₹400 crore (US$42 million) | |
| 2014 | PK | ₹85 crore (US$8.8 million) | ₹770 crore (US$80 million) | |
| 2018 | Sanju | ₹96 crore (US$10 million) | ₹586 crore (US$61 million) | |
| 2023 | Dunki | ₹120 crore (US$12 million) | ₹458.93 crore (US$48 million)–₹470.6 crore (US$49 million) | |
