= List of awards and nominations received by Ranbir Kapoor =

Ranbir Kapoor awards and nominations
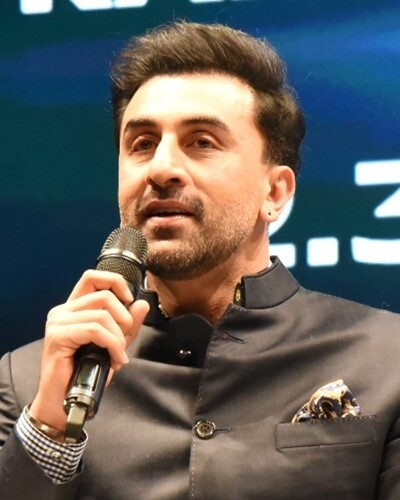
- Kapoor in 2024
Awards and nominations
Award	Wins	Nominations
Asian Film Awards	0	1
BIG Star Entertainment Awards	9	9
CNN-IBN Indian of the Year	4	0
Filmfare Awards	7	14
Indian Film Festival	2	2
IIFA Awards	7	13
NDTV Indian of the Year	2	0
Screen Awards	4	15
Star Guild Awards	4	7
Stardust Awards	10	11
Zee Cine Awards	7	13
People's Choice Awards	2	0
Other awards	5	59

Totals (Note: Certain award groups do not simply award one winner. They acknowledge several different recipients, have runners-up, and have third place. Since this is a specific recognition and is different from losing an award, runner-up mentions are considered wins in this award tally. For simplification and to avoid errors, each award in this list has been presumed to have had a prior nomination.)
- Wins: 58
- Nominations: 110

Ranbir Kapoor is an Indian actor, who is recipient of more than 50 accolades. He has won seven Filmfare Awards, six International Indian Film Academy Awards, five Screen Awards, ten Stardust Awards and seven Zee Cine Awards for his highly acclaimed performances. Kapoor made his acting debut with the director's 2007 tragic romance Saawariya for which he won the Filmfare Award for Best Male Debut. Kapoor later earned critical praise for his performances in Wake Up Sid, Ajab Prem Ki Ghazab Kahani, and Rocket Singh: Salesman of the Year in 2009. These performances earned him the Filmfare Award for Best Actor (Critics). He was later recognized for his role as an active member of a political family in the political thriller Raajneeti (2010), which also earned him Best Actor nominations at various award ceremonies.

In 2012, Kapoor received the Filmfare Award for Best Actor and the Filmfare Award for Best Actor (Critics) for his praised performance in the musical romantic drama Rockstar, and his second Filmfare Award for Best Actor for his portrayal of a deaf-mute man in Barfi! (2012). The romantic comedy-drama Yeh Jawaani Hai Deewani (2013) earned him another nomination for the Filmfare Award for Best Actor.

Kapoor's next set of films received mixed critical and commercial response, but his performances in the romantic dramas Tamasha (2015) and Ae Dil Hai Mushkil (2016) fetched him critical acclaim and Best Actor nominations at several award ceremonies. In 2018, Kapoor portrayed Sanjay Dutt in Rajkumar Hirani's biopic Sanju, which received wide range positive reviews from critics and Kapoor's portrayal won him another Filmfare Award for Best Actor. He followed it with the action drama Animal (2023), which won him his fourth Filmfare Award for Best Actor.

In addition to film awards, Kapoor has topped lists like People magazine's "Sexiest Man Alive" in India and Filmfare's poll of the "Most Stylish Young Actor". He is also one of the recipients of the "People of the Year" award by the Limca Book of Records.

== Asian Film Awards ==
The Asian Film Awards are presented annually by the Hong Kong International Film Festival Society to members of Asian cinema. Kapoor has received one nomination.

List of Asian Film Awards and nominations received by Ranbir Kapoor
Year	Nominated work	Category	Result	Ref.
2019	Sanju	Best Actor	Nominated	

== BIG Star Entertainment Awards ==
The BIG Star Entertainment Awards is an annual event organised by the Reliance Broadcast Network. Kapoor has received nine awards from nine nominations.

List of BIG Star Entertainment Awards and nominations received by Ranbir Kapoor
Year	Nominated work	Category	Result	Ref.
2010	—N/a	New Talent of the Decade – Male	Won	
2010	Raajneeti	Most Entertaining Film Actor – Male	Won	
2011	Rockstar	Most Entertaining Film Actor – Male	Won	
2011	Rockstar	Most Entertaining Film Actor in a Romantic Role – Male	Won	
2012	Barfi!	Most Entertaining Film Actor in a Romantic Role – Male	Won	
2012	Barfi!	Most Entertaining Film Actor – Male	Won	
2013	Yeh Jawaani Hai Deewani	Most Entertaining Film Actor – Male	Won	
2013	Yeh Jawaani Hai Deewani	Most Entertaining Film Actor in a Romantic Role – Male	Won	
2015	Tamasha	Most Entertaining Film Actor in a Romantic Role – Male	Won	

== CNN-IBN Indian of the Year ==
The CNN-IBN Indian of the Year is an award presented annually by CNN-IBN since 2006 to Indians who have been judged to have helped strengthen society and build Brand India during the year. Kapoor has received three awards.

List of CNN-IBN Indian of the Year awards and nominations received by Ranbir Kapoor
Year	Category	Result	Ref.
2009	Entertainment	Won	
2011	Entertainment	Won	
2012	Entertainment	Won	
2014	Entertainment	Won	

== Filmfare Awards ==
The Filmfare Awards are presented annually by The Times Group for excellence of cinematic achievements in Hindi cinema. Kapoor has received seven awards from fourteen nominations.

List of Filmfare Awards and nominations received by Ranbir Kapoor
Year	Nominated work	Category	Result	Ref.
2008	Saawariya	Best Male Debut	Won	
2010	Wake Up Sid, Ajab Prem Ki Ghazab Kahani & Rocket Singh: Salesman of the Year	Best Actor (Critics)	Won	
2010	Wake Up Sid & Ajab Prem Ki Ghazab Kahani	Best Actor	Nominated	
2011	Raajneeti	Best Actor	Nominated	
2012	Rockstar	Best Actor	Won	
2012	Rockstar	Best Actor (Critics)	Won	
2013	Barfi!	Best Actor	Won	
2014	Yeh Jawaani Hai Deewani	Best Actor	Nominated	
2016	Tamasha	Best Actor	Nominated	
2017	Ae Dil Hai Mushkil	Best Actor	Nominated	
2018	Jagga Jasoos	Best Actor (Critics)	Nominated	
2019	Sanju	Best Actor (Critics)	Nominated	
2019	Sanju	Best Actor	Won	
2024	Animal	Best Actor	Won	

== Indian Film Festival Melbourne ==
Indian Film Festival of Melbourne

List of Indian Film Festival Melbourne awards and nominations received by Ranbir Kapoor
Year	Nominated work	Category	Result	Ref.
2018	Sanju	Vanguard Award	Won	
2018	Sanju	Best Actor	Won	

== International Indian Film Academy Awards ==
The International Indian Film Academy Awards (shortened as IIFA) is annual international event organised by the Wizcraft International Entertainment Pvt. Ltd. to honour excellence in the Hindi cinema. Kapoor has won six awards from thirteen nominations.

List of International Indian Film Academy Awards and nominations received by Ranbir Kapoor
Year	Nominated work	Category	Result	Ref.
2008	Saawariya	Star Debut of the Year – Male	Won	
2010	Wake Up Sid	Best Actor	Nominated	
2011	Raajneeti	Best Actor	Nominated	
2012	Rockstar	Best Actor	Won	
2012	Rockstar	Hottest Pair (along with Nargis Fakhri)	Won	
2013	Barfi!	Best Actor	Won	
2013	Yeh Jawaani Hai Deewani	Hottest Pair (along with Deepika Padukone)	Won	
2014	Yeh Jawaani Hai Deewani	Best Actor	Nominated	
2016	Tamasha	Best Actor	Nominated	
2017	Ae Dil Hai Mushkil	Best Actor	Nominated	
2018	Jagga Jasoos	Best Actor	Nominated	
2019	Sanju	Best Actor	Nominated	
2019	Barfi!	Best Actor in 20 years	Won	

== NDV Indian of the Year ==
The NDTV Indian of the Year is an annual award presented by NDTV. Kapoor has won two awards.

List of NDV Indian of the Year awards and nominations received by Ranbir Kapoor
Year	Category	Result	Ref.
2009	Indian of the Year	Won	
2014	Bollywood Youth Icon of the Year	Won	

== Star Screen Awards ==
The Star Screen Awards is a yearly ceremony honouring professional excellence in the Hindi language film industry. Kapoor has won three awards from fifteen nominations.

List of Star Screen Awards and nominations received by Ranbir Kapoor
Year	Nominated work	Category	Result	Ref.
2008	Saawariya	Most Promising Newcomer – Male	Won	
2010	Ajab Prem Ki Ghazab Kahani	Best Actor	Nominated	
2010	Rocket Singh: Salesman of the Year	Best Actor	Nominated	
2010	Wake Up Sid & Ajab Prem Ki Ghazab Kahani	Best Actor (Popular Choice)	Nominated	
2010	Ajab Prem Ki Ghazab Kahani	Jodi No. 1 (along with Katrina Kaif)	Nominated	
2011	Raajneeti	Best Actor (Popular Choice)	Nominated	
2011	Raajneeti	Best Actor	Nominated	
2012	Rockstar	Best Actor	Won	
2012	Rockstar	Best Actor (Popular Choice)	Nominated	
2013	Barfi!	Best Actor (Popular Choice)	Nominated	
2013	Barfi!	Jodi No. 1 (along with Priyanka Chopra)	Won	
2013	Barfi!	Best Actor	Won	
2014	Yeh Jawaani Hai Deewani	Best Actor	Nominated	
2014	Yeh Jawaani Hai Deewani	Best Actor (Popular Choice)	Nominated	
2018	Sanju	Best Actor (Popular Choice)	Nominated	

== Star Guild Awards ==
The Star Guild Awards (previously known as the Apsara Film & Television Producers Guild Awards) are presented by the Apsara Producers Guild to honour and recognise the professional excellence of their peers. Kapoor has received four awards from seven nominations.

List of Star Guild Awards and nominations received by Ranbir Kapoor
Year	Nominated work	Category	Result	Ref.
2008	Saawariya	Best Male Debut	Won	
2010	Wake Up Sid	Best Actor in a Leading Role	Nominated	
2010	—N/a	Entertainer of the Year	Won	
2011	Raajneeti	Best Actor in a Leading Role	Nominated	
2012	Rockstar	Best Actor in a Leading Role	Won	
2013	Barfi!	Best Actor in a Leading Role	Won	
2014	Yeh Jawaani Hai Deewani	Best Actor in a Leading Role	Nominated	

== Stardust Awards ==
The Stardust Awards is a yearly ceremony honouring professional excellence in the Hindi language film industry. Kapoor has won ten awards from ten nominations.

List of Star Screen Awards and nominations received by Ranbir Kapoor
Year	Nominated work	Category	Result	Ref.
2008	Saawariya	Superstar of Tomorrow – Male	Won	
2010	Wake Up Sid & Ajab Prem Ki Ghazab Kahani	Superstar of Tomorrow – Male	Won	
2009	Bachna Ae Haseeno	Star of the Year – Male	Won	
2011	Raajneeti	Best Actor – Drama	Won	
2011	Raajneeti	Star of the Year – Male	Won	
2012	Rockstar	Best Actor – Drama	Won	
2012	Rockstar	Star of the Year – Male	Won	
2013	Barfi!	Best Actor – Drama	Won	
2013	Barfi!	Star of the Year – Male	Won	
2015	Tamasha	Best Actor of the Year (Male)	Won	

== Zee Cine Awards ==
The Zee Cine Awards is a yearly ceremony honouring professional excellence in the Hindi language film industry. Kapoor has won five awards from thirteen nominations.

List of Star Screen Awards and nominations received by Ranbir Kapoor
Year	Nominated work	Category	Result	Ref.
2008	Saawariya	Best Male Debut	Won	
2011	—	Best International Icon – Male	Won	
2012	Rockstar	Best Actor – Male	Won	
2013	Barfi!	Best Actor (Critics)	Won	
2019	Sanju	Best Actor – Male	Won	

== People's Choice Awards ==
People's Choice Awards India

Won

- 2012 – Favorite Movie Youth Icon
- 2012 – Favorite Movie Actor – Male for Rockstar

== Other awards and recognitions ==
List of other awards and recognitions received by Ranbir Kapoor
Year	Award/Organisation	Category	Nominated work	Result	Ref.
2013	Limca Book of Records	People of the Year	—	Won	
2019	Critics Choice Film Awards	Best Actor (Male)	Sanju	Nominated	
2024	Lokmat Stylish Awards	Maharashtrian of the Year	—	Won	

== See also ==
- List of accolades received by Barfi!
