= Ranbir Kapoor filmography =

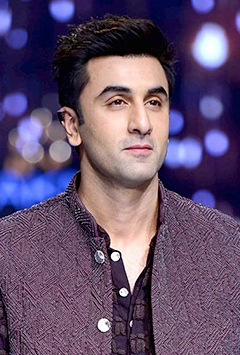
Kapoor in 2022

Ranbir Kapoor is an Indian actor known for his work in Hindi-language films. He worked as an assistant director on the films Aa Ab Laut Chalen (1999) and Black (2005), before making his acting debut in Sanjay Leela Bhansali's romantic drama Saawariya (2007). It earned Kapoor the Filmfare Award for Best Male Debut. He established himself in 2009 with leading roles in three films—the coming-of-age drama Wake Up Sid, the comedy Ajab Prem Ki Ghazab Kahani and the drama Rocket Singh: Salesman of the Year. He won the Filmfare Critics Award for Best Actor for his combined work in these three films. In 2010, Kapoor played a character based on Arjuna and Michael Corleone in the commercially successful political thriller Raajneeti.

From 2011 to 2013, Kapoor's releases were among the highest-grossing Hindi films of their respective years. In Imtiaz Ali's musical Rockstar (2011) he played an aspiring singer, and in Anurag Basu's comedy-drama Barfi! (2012), he starred as a joyful deaf and mute man. His performance in both films was critically acclaimed and he earned two consecutive Best Actor awards at Filmfare and the former also earned him a Filmfare Critics Award for Best Actor. The romantic comedy Yeh Jawaani Hai Deewani (2013) further established him as a star.

This success was followed by some commercial failures, including the period drama Bombay Velvet (2015), the romance Tamasha (2015), and the comic mystery Jagga Jasoos (2017); the latter also marked Kapoor's first production venture. His sole commercial success in this period came with Ae Dil Hai Mushkil (2016), in which he starred as a musician. In 2018, Kapoor portrayed the actor Sanjay Dutt in the biopic Sanju, which grossed over ₹5.87 billion (US$63 million) becoming highest-grossing Hindi film of the year, and earned him another Filmfare Award for Best Actor.

In 2022, he starred in the period film Shamshera and the fantasy film Brahmāstra: Part One – Shiva. The latter ranks among the most expensive Indian films and the highest-grossing Hindi films. In 2023, he starred in the romantic comedy Tu Jhoothi Main Makkaar and played a violent criminal in the action drama Animal, which earned over ₹9 billion (US$96 million) to emerge as his highest-grossing release and one of the highest-grossing Hindi films of all time. For the latter, he won his fourth Filmfare Award for Best Actor.

== Films ==
Key
†	Denotes films that have not yet been released

- All films are in Hindi unless otherwise noted.

List of film credits
Year	Title	Role	Notes	Ref.
1996	Prem Granth	—N/a	Assistant director	
1999	Aa Ab Laut Chalen	—N/a	Assistant director	
2005	Black	—N/a	Assistant director	
2007	Saawariya	Ranbir Raj	Debut film	
2008	Bachna Ae Haseeno	Raj Sharma		
2009	Luck By Chance	Himself	Cameo	
2009	Wake Up Sid	Siddharth "Sid" Mehra		
2009	Ajab Prem Ki Ghazab Kahani	Prem Shankar Sharma		
2009	Rocket Singh: Salesman of the Year	Harpreet Singh Bedi		
2010	Raajneeti	Samar Pratap		
2010	Anjaana Anjaani	Akash Khanna		
2011	Chillar Party	Himself	Cameo	
2011	Rockstar	Janardhan "Jordan" Jakhar (JJ)		
2012	Barfi!	Murphy "Barfi" Johnson		
2013	Bombay Talkies	Himself	Cameo	
2013	Yeh Jawaani Hai Deewani	Kabir "Bunny" Thapar		
2013	Besharam	Babli Chautala		
2014	Bhoothnath Returns	Himself	Cameo	
2014	PK	Alien	Cameo	
2015	Roy	Roy	Extended cameo	
2015	Bombay Velvet	Johnny Balraj		
2015	Tamasha	Ved Vardhan Sahni		
2016	Ae Dil Hai Mushkil	Ayan Sanger		
2017	Jagga Jasoos	Jagga Rana Bagchi	Also producer	
2018	Sanju	Sanjay Dutt		
2018	Bucket List	Himself	Cameo ; Marathi film debut	
2018	Love Per Square Foot	Gattu	Cameo	
2022	Shamshera	Shamshera / Balli (Note: Kapoor played dual roles in the film.)		
2022	Brahmāstra: Part One – Shiva	Shiva / Dev	Also producer	
2022	Rocket Gang	Angel	Cameo	
2022	Govinda Naam Mera	Himself	Cameo	
2023	Tu Jhoothi Main Makkaar	Rohan "Mickey" Arora		
2023	Animal	Ranvijay Singh / Aziz Haque		
2026	Ramayana: Part 1	Rama / Parshurama		
2027	Love & War †	TBA	Post production	
2028	Ramayana: Part 2 †	Rama	Filming	

== Short films ==
Year	Title	Role(s)	Language	Ref.
2004	Karma	Aryan Malhotra	Hindi	

== Television ==
List of television credits
Year	Title	Role	Ref.
2009	54th Filmfare Awards	Host	
2011	56th Filmfare Awards	Host	
2012	57th Filmfare Awards	Host	
2014	59th Filmfare Awards	Host	
2023	The Romantics	Himself	
2025	The Ba***ds of Bollywood	Himself	
2025	Dining with the Kapoors	Himself	

== Music videos ==
List of music video credits
Year	Title	Performer(s)	Ref.
1993	"Pyar Ki Ganga Bahe"	Mohammed Aziz, Udit Narayan, Manhar Udhas & Jolly Mukherjee	
2010	"Phir Mile Sur Mera Tumhara"	Various	
2019	"Smile Deke Dekho"	Amit Trivedi, Sunidhi Chauhan & Nakash Aziz	

== Discography ==
Discography
Year	Track	Album	Ref.
2013	"Love Ki Ghanti"	Besharam	
2013	"Love Ki Ghanti" (remix)	Besharam	
2018	"Baba Bolta Hain Bas Ho Gaya"	Sanju	
2023	"Tu Jhoothi Main Makkar (TitleTrack)"	Tu Jhoothi Main Makkar	

== See also ==
- List of awards and nominations received by Ranbir Kapoor
