= Manyata =

Manyata may refer to

- Manyata Embassy Business Park, Bengaluru, India
- Manyata Dutt, Indian film producer
- Manyata Multi Link Pvt. Ltd., Inaruwa, Nepal
