= IIFA Award for Hottest Pair =

Film award in India

The IIFA Award Hottest Pair was first introduced in 2011. The award goes to a pair that have stood out and been appreciated by the Indian audiences. Unlike the other awards this one is chosen by the viewers. The winner is announced in July.

== Multiple wins ==
Wins	Recipient
2	Ranbir Kapoor

== Winners ==
Year	Actor & Actress	Film
2011	Ranveer Singh & Anushka Sharma	Band Baaja Baaraat
2012	Ranbir Kapoor & Nargis Fakhri	Rockstar
2013	Ranbir Kapoor & Deepika Padukone	Yeh Jawaani Hai Deewani
2016	Sooraj Pancholi & Athiya Shetty	Hero

== See also ==
- IIFA Awards
- Bollywood
- Cinema of India
