= List of accolades received by Barfi! =

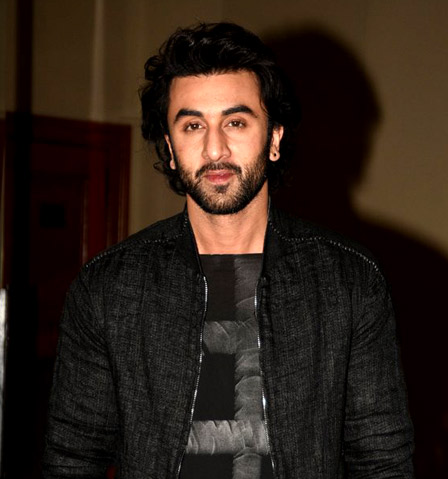

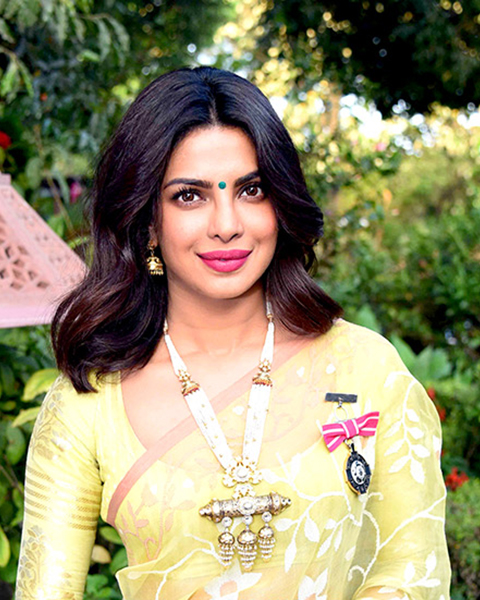
Kapoor (top) and Chopra (bottom) garnered several awards and nominations for their performances as male and female leading roles respectively.

Barfi! is a 2012 Indian romantic comedy-drama film written and directed by Anurag Basu and produced by UTV Motion Pictures. The film features Ranbir Kapoor, Priyanka Chopra, and Ileana D'Cruz in the lead roles, with Saurabh Shukla, Ashish Vidyarthi, and Roopa Ganguly playing supporting roles. The screenplay which incorporates a nonlinear narrative was co-written by Basu with his wife Tani. Pritam Chakraborty composed the musical and background score while Akiv Ali edited the film, with the cinematography provided by Ravi Varman. Set between 1972 and 2012, the film narrates the story of the title character from Darjeeling and his relationships with two women, Shruti and the autistic Jhilmil.

Made on a budget of approximately ₹410 million (US$4.3 million), Barfi! opened worldwide on 14 September 2012 to widespread critical acclaim. It was a major commercial success, grossing ₹1.88 billion (US$20 million) at the box office. Barfi! has received various awards and nominations, with praise for its direction, the cast's performances, cinematography, screenplay, musical score, costume and production design. As of June 2015, the film has won 70 awards.

At the 58th Filmfare Awards, Barfi! received the most nominations (thirteen), winning a leading seven awards, including Best Film and Best Actor for Kapoor. It received sixteen nominations at the 2012 Star Guild Awards and won eight awards, including the Best Film and Best Director. The film received twenty-three nominations at the 19th Screen Awards, winning nine awards, including Best Director for Basu and Best Actor for Kapoor. At the 14th IIFA Awards, it won fourteen awards, out of twenty-one nominations, including the Best Film and Best Director. At the 14th Zee Cine Awards, Barfi! received nine awards, including Best Film, Best Director for Basu and Best Actress for Chopra.

== Accolades ==
| Award | Date of ceremony (Note: Date is linked to the article about the awards held that year, wherever possible.) | Category | Recipient(s) and nominee(s) | Result | Ref(s) |
|---|---|---|---|---|---|
| Apsara Film & Television Producers Guild Awards (Note: Also known as Star Guild Awards.) | 16 February 2013 | Best Film | Barfi! | Won | |
| Apsara Film & Television Producers Guild Awards | 16 February 2013 | Best Director | Anurag Basu | Won (Note: Tied with Sujoy Ghosh for Kahaani.) | |
| Apsara Film & Television Producers Guild Awards | 16 February 2013 | Best Actor in a Leading Role | Ranbir Kapoor | Won | |
| Apsara Film & Television Producers Guild Awards | 16 February 2013 | Best Actress in a Leading Role | Priyanka Chopra | Nominated | |
| Apsara Film & Television Producers Guild Awards | 16 February 2013 | The Shining Star Award | Priyanka Chopra | Won (Note: Also for Agneepath.) | |
| Apsara Film & Television Producers Guild Awards | 16 February 2013 | Best Actor in a Supporting Role | Saurabh Shukla | Nominated | |
| Apsara Film & Television Producers Guild Awards | 16 February 2013 | Best Female Debut | Ileana D'Cruz | Won | |
| Apsara Film & Television Producers Guild Awards | 16 February 2013 | Best Music Director | Pritam Chakraborty | Nominated | |
| Apsara Film & Television Producers Guild Awards | 16 February 2013 | Best Lyricist | Sayeed Quadri (for song "Phir Le Aya Dil") | Nominated | |
| Apsara Film & Television Producers Guild Awards | 16 February 2013 | Best Male Playback Singer | Mohit Chauhan (for song "Ala Barfi") | Nominated | |
| Apsara Film & Television Producers Guild Awards | 16 February 2013 | Best Male Playback Singer | Nikhil Paul George (for song "Main Kya Karoon") | Nominated | |
| Apsara Film & Television Producers Guild Awards | 16 February 2013 | Best Dialogue | Sanjeev Datta | Nominated | |
| Apsara Film & Television Producers Guild Awards | 16 February 2013 | Best Story | Anurag Basu, Tani Basu | Nominated | |
| Apsara Film & Television Producers Guild Awards | 16 February 2013 | Best Screenplay | Anurag Basu, Tani Basu | Nominated | |
| Apsara Film & Television Producers Guild Awards | 16 February 2013 | Best Cinematography | Ravi Varman | Won (Note: Tied with Rajeev Ravi for Gangs of Wasseypur – Part 1 and Part 2.) | |
| Apsara Film & Television Producers Guild Awards | 16 February 2013 | Best Sound Mixing | Debajit Changmai | Won | |
| Apsara Film & Television Producers Guild Awards | 16 February 2013 | Best Costume Design | Aki Narula, Shefalina | Won | |
| Asian Film Awards | 18 March 2013 | Best Composer | Pritam Chakraborty | Won | |
| BIG Star Entertainment Awards | 31 December 2012 | Most Entertaining Film | Barfi! | Nominated | |
| BIG Star Entertainment Awards | 31 December 2012 | Most Entertaining Romantic Film | Barfi! | Won | |
| BIG Star Entertainment Awards | 31 December 2012 | Most Entertaining Director | Anurag Basu | Won | |
| BIG Star Entertainment Awards | 31 December 2012 | Most Entertaining Film Actor – Male | Ranbir Kapoor | Nominated | |
| BIG Star Entertainment Awards | 31 December 2012 | Most Entertaining Actor in a Romantic Film – Male | Ranbir Kapoor | Won | |
| BIG Star Entertainment Awards | 31 December 2012 | Most Entertaining Film Actor – Female | Priyanka Chopra | Won | |
| BIG Star Entertainment Awards | 31 December 2012 | Most Entertaining Actor in a Romantic Film – Female | Priyanka Chopra | Nominated | |
| BIG Star Entertainment Awards | 31 December 2012 | Most Entertaining Actor (Film) Debut – Female | Ileana D'Cruz | Nominated | |
| BIG Star Entertainment Awards | 31 December 2012 | Most Entertaining Music | Pritam Chakraborty | Nominated | |
| BIG Star Entertainment Awards | 31 December 2012 | Most Entertaining Singer – Male | Mohit Chauhan (for song "Ala Barfi") | Nominated | |
| ETC Bollywood Business Awards | 5 January 2013 | Highest Grosser of the Year | Barfi! | Nominated | |
| ETC Bollywood Business Awards | 5 January 2013 | Top Grossing Director | Anurag Basu | Nominated | |
| ETC Bollywood Business Awards | 5 January 2013 | Most Profitable Actor | Ranbir Kapoor | Nominated | |
| ETC Bollywood Business Awards | 5 January 2013 | Most Profitable Actress | Priyanka Chopra | Nominated | |
| ETC Bollywood Business Awards | 5 January 2013 | Most Profitable Debut (Female) | Ileana D'Cruz | Won | |
| Filmfare Awards | 20 January 2013 | Best Film | Barfi! | Won | |
| Filmfare Awards | 20 January 2013 | Best Director | Anurag Basu | Nominated | |
| Filmfare Awards | 20 January 2013 | Best Actor | Ranbir Kapoor | Won | |
| Filmfare Awards | 20 January 2013 | Best Actress | Priyanka Chopra | Nominated | |
| Filmfare Awards | 20 January 2013 | Best Supporting Actress | Ileana D'Cruz | Nominated | |
| Filmfare Awards | 20 January 2013 | Best Female Debut | Ileana D'Cruz | Won | |
| Filmfare Awards | 20 January 2013 | Best Music Director | Pritam Chakraborty | Won | |
| Filmfare Awards | 20 January 2013 | Best Background Score | Pritam Chakraborty | Won | |
| Filmfare Awards | 20 January 2013 | Best Lyricist | Swanand Kirkire (for song "Aashiyaan") | Nominated | |
| Filmfare Awards | 20 January 2013 | Best Male Playback Singer | Mohit Chauhan (for song "Ala Barfi") | Nominated | |
| Filmfare Awards | 20 January 2013 | Best Male Playback Singer | Nikhil Paul George (for song "Main Kya Karoon") | Nominated | |
| Filmfare Awards | 20 January 2013 | Best Production Design | Rajat Poddar | Won | |
| Filmfare Awards | 20 January 2013 | Sony Trendsetter of the Year | Barfi! | Won | |
| IIFA Awards | 6 July 2013 | Best Film | Barfi! | Won | |
| IIFA Awards | 6 July 2013 | Best Director | Anurag Basu | Won | |
| IIFA Awards | 6 July 2013 | Best Actor | Ranbir Kapoor | Won | |
| IIFA Awards | 6 July 2013 | Best Actress | Priyanka Chopra | Nominated | |
| IIFA Awards | 6 July 2013 | Best Supporting Actor | Saurabh Shukla | Nominated | |
| IIFA Awards | 6 July 2013 | Best Music Director | Pritam Chakraborty | Won | |
| IIFA Awards | 6 July 2013 | Best Story | Anurag Basu, Tani Basu | Won | |
| IIFA Awards | 6 July 2013 | Best Screenplay | Anurag Basu, Tani Basu | Won | |
| IIFA Awards | 6 July 2013 | Best Lyricist | Sayeed Quadri (for song "Phir Le Aya Dil (Reprise)") | Nominated | |
| IIFA Awards | 6 July 2013 | Best Lyricist | Swanand Kirkire (for song "Aashiyan (Solo)" & "Ala Barfi") | Nominated | |
| IIFA Awards | 6 July 2013 | Best Male Playback Singer | Nikhil Paul George (for song "Main Kya Karoon" & "Aashiyan") | Nominated | |
| IIFA Awards | 6 July 2013 | Best Female Playback Singer | Rekha Bhardwaj (for song "Phir Le Aya Dil") | Nominated | |
| IIFA Awards | 6 July 2013 | Best Female Playback Singer | Shreya Ghoshal (for song "Aashiyan (Duet)") | Nominated | |
| IIFA Awards | 6 July 2013 | Best Cinematography | Ravi Varman | Won | |
| IIFA Awards | 6 July 2013 | Best Art Direction | Rajat Poddar | Won | |
| IIFA Awards | 6 July 2013 | Best Sound Design | Shajith Koyeri | Won | |
| IIFA Awards | 6 July 2013 | Best Sound Recording | Eric Pillai | Won | |
| IIFA Awards | 6 July 2013 | Best Mixing | Debajit Changmai | Won | |
| IIFA Awards | 6 July 2013 | Best Background Score | Pritam Chakraborty | Won | |
| IIFA Awards | 6 July 2013 | Best Costume Design | Aki Narula, Shefalina | Won | |
| IIFA Awards | 6 July 2013 | Best Makeup | Uday Serali | Won | |
| Lions Gold Awards | 18 January 2013 | Favourite Actress in a Leading Role | Priyanka Chopra | Won | |
| Mirchi Music Awards | 7 February 2013 | Album of the Year | Barfi! | Nominated | |
| Mirchi Music Awards | 7 February 2013 | Music Composer of the Year | Pritam Chakraborty (for song "Ala Barfi") | Nominated | |
| Mirchi Music Awards | 7 February 2013 | Music Composer of the Year | Pritam Chakraborty (for song "Phir Le Aya Dil") | Nominated | |
| Mirchi Music Awards | 7 February 2013 | Lyricist of the Year | Neelesh Mishra (for song "Kyon") | Nominated | |
| Mirchi Music Awards | 7 February 2013 | Upcoming Male Vocalist of the Year | Nikhil Paul George (for song "Main Kya Karoon") | Nominated | |
| Mirchi Music Awards | 7 February 2013 | Upcoming Male Vocalist of the Year | Nikhil Paul George (for song "Aashiyan") | Nominated | |
| Mirchi Music Awards | 7 February 2013 | Upcoming Male Vocalist of the Year | Arjit Singh (for the song "Phir Le Aya Dil") | Nominated | |
| Mirchi Music Awards | 7 February 2013 | Technical Programmer & Arranger of the Year | Jim Satya, DJ Phukan | Nominated | |
| Mirchi Music Awards | 7 February 2013 | Technical Background score of the Year | Pritam Chakraborty | Nominated | |
| Okinawa International Movie Festival | 30 March 2013 | Grand Jury Prize for Best Film (Golden Shisa Award) | Barfi! | Won | |
| Screen Awards | 12 January 2013 | Best Film | Barfi! | Nominated | |
| Screen Awards | 12 January 2013 | Best Director | Anurag Basu | Won | |
| Screen Awards | 12 January 2013 | Best Actor | Ranbir Kapoor | Won (Note: Tied with Irrfan Khan for Paan Singh Tomar.) | |
| Screen Awards | 12 January 2013 | Best Actor (Popular Choice) | Ranbir Kapoor | Nominated | |
| Screen Awards | 12 January 2013 | Best Actress | Priyanka Chopra | Nominated | |
| Screen Awards | 12 January 2013 | Best Actress (Popular Choice) | Priyanka Chopra | Nominated | |
| Screen Awards | 12 January 2013 | Jodi No. 1 | Ranbir Kapoor, Priyanka Chopra | Won | |
| Screen Awards | 12 January 2013 | Best Supporting Actress | Ileana D'Cruz | Nominated | |
| Screen Awards | 12 January 2013 | Most Promising Newcomer – Female | Ileana D'Cruz | Won | |
| Screen Awards | 12 January 2013 | Best Music Director | Pritam Chakraborty | Won | |
| Screen Awards | 12 January 2013 | Best Background Music | Pritam Chakraborty | Won | |
| Screen Awards | 12 January 2013 | Most Popular Music Album | Pritam Chakraborty | Won | |
| Screen Awards | 12 January 2013 | Best Male Playback Singer | Mohit Chauhan (for song "Ala Barfi") | Nominated | |
| Screen Awards | 12 January 2013 | Best Male Playback Singer | Nikhil Paul George (for song "Main Kya Karoon") | Nominated | |
| Screen Awards | 12 January 2013 | Best Lyricist | Swanand Kirkire (for song "Aashiyaan") | Nominated | |
| Screen Awards | 12 January 2013 | Best Story | Anurag Basu, Tani Basu | Nominated | |
| Screen Awards | 12 January 2013 | Best Screenplay | Anurag Basu, Tani Basu | Nominated | |
| Screen Awards | 12 January 2013 | Best Marketed Film | Barfi! | Won | |
| Screen Awards | 12 January 2013 | Best Cinematography | Ravi Varman | Won | |
| Screen Awards | 12 January 2013 | Best Sound Design | Shajith Koyeri | Nominated | |
| Screen Awards | 12 January 2013 | Best Costumes | Aki Narula, Shefalina | Nominated | |
| Screen Awards | 12 January 2013 | Best Editing | Akiv Ali | Nominated | |
| Screen Awards | 12 January 2013 | Best Production Design | Rajat Poddar | Nominated | |
| South African Indian Film and Television Awards | 7 September 2013 | Best Film | Barfi! | Won | |
| South African Indian Film and Television Awards | 7 September 2013 | Best Actor | Ranbir Kapoor | Won | |
| South African Indian Film and Television Awards | 7 September 2013 | Best Actress | Priyanka Chopra | Won | |
| Stardust Awards | 26 January 2013 | Best Film of The Year | Barfi! | Won | |
| Stardust Awards | 26 January 2013 | Dream Director | Anurag Basu | Nominated | |
| Stardust Awards | 26 January 2013 | Star of the Year – Male | Ranbir Kapoor | Nominated | |
| Stardust Awards | 26 January 2013 | Best Actor – Drama | Ranbir Kapoor | Nominated | |
| Stardust Awards | 26 January 2013 | Star of the Year – Female | Priyanka Chopra | Won | |
| Stardust Awards | 26 January 2013 | Best Actress – Drama | Priyanka Chopra | Won | |
| Stardust Awards | 26 January 2013 | Superstar of Tomorrow – Female | Ileana D'Cruz | Nominated | |
| Stardust Awards | 26 January 2013 | New Musical Sensation Singer – Male | Nikhil Paul George (for song "Main Kya Karoon") | Nominated | |
| Stardust Awards | 26 January 2013 | New Musical Sensation Singer – Male | Papon (for song "Kyon") | Nominated | |
| Times of India Film Awards | 6 April 2013 | Best Film | Barfi! | Won | |
| Times of India Film Awards | 6 April 2013 | Best Director | Anurag Basu | Won | |
| Times of India Film Awards | 6 April 2013 | Best Actor – Male | Ranbir Kapoor | Won | |
| Times of India Film Awards | 6 April 2013 | Best Actor – Female | Priyanka Chopra | Won | |
| Times of India Film Awards | 6 April 2013 | Best Supporting Actor – Female | Ileana D'Cruz | Nominated | |
| Times of India Film Awards | 6 April 2013 | Best Debut – Female | Ileana D'Cruz | Won | |
| Times of India Film Awards | 6 April 2013 | Best Music Director | Pritam Chakraborty | Nominated | |
| Times of India Film Awards | 6 April 2013 | Best Lyrics | Swanand Kirkire (for song "Aashiyan") | Nominated | |
| Times of India Film Awards | 6 April 2013 | Best Male Playback Singer | Mohit Chauhan (for song "Ala Barfi") | Nominated | |
| Times of India Film Awards | 6 April 2013 | Best Male Playback Singer | Nikhil Paul George (for song "Aashiyan") | Nominated | |
| Times of India Film Awards | 6 April 2013 | Best Female Playback Singer | Shreya Ghoshal (for song "Aashiyan") | Nominated | |
| Times of India Film Awards | 6 April 2013 | Best Background Score | Pritam Chakraborty | Won | |
| Times of India Film Awards | 6 April 2013 | Best Art Direction | Rajat Poddar | Won | |
| Times of India Film Awards | 6 April 2013 | Best Cinematography | Ravi Varman | Won | |
| Times of India Film Awards | 6 April 2013 | Best Costume Design | Aki Narula, Shefalina | Won | |
| Zee Cine Awards | 7 January 2013 | Best Film | Barfi! | Won | |
| Zee Cine Awards | 7 January 2013 | Best Director | Anurag Basu | Won | |
| Zee Cine Awards | 7 January 2013 | Best Actor – Male | Ranbir Kapoor | Nominated | |
| Zee Cine Awards | 7 January 2013 | Best Actor (Critics' Choice) | Ranbir Kapoor | Won | |
| Zee Cine Awards | 7 January 2013 | Best Actor – Female | Priyanka Chopra | Won | |
| Zee Cine Awards | 7 January 2013 | Best Female Debut | Ileana D'Cruz | Won (Note: Tied with Yami Gautam for Vicky Donor.) | |
| Zee Cine Awards | 7 January 2013 | Best Story | Anurag Basu | | |
| Zee Cine Awards | 7 January 2013 | Best Screenplay | Won | | |
| Zee Cine Awards | 7 January 2013 | Best Music Director | Pritam Chakraborty | Nominated | |
| Zee Cine Awards | 7 January 2013 | Best Lyricist | Neelesh Mishra (for song "Kyon") | Nominated | |
| Zee Cine Awards | 7 January 2013 | Best Male Playback Singer | Mohit Chauhan (for song "Ala Barfi") | Nominated | |
| Zee Cine Awards | 7 January 2013 | Best Cinematography | Ravi Varman | Won | |
| Zee Cine Awards | 7 January 2013 | Best Production Design | Rajat Poddar | Won | |
| Zee Cine Awards | 7 January 2013 | The Power Club Box Office Award (100 Crore Club Award) | Barfi! | Won | |

== See also ==
- List of Bollywood films of 2012
