= Manyata Dutt =

Indian entrepreneur (born 1978)

Maanayata Dutt
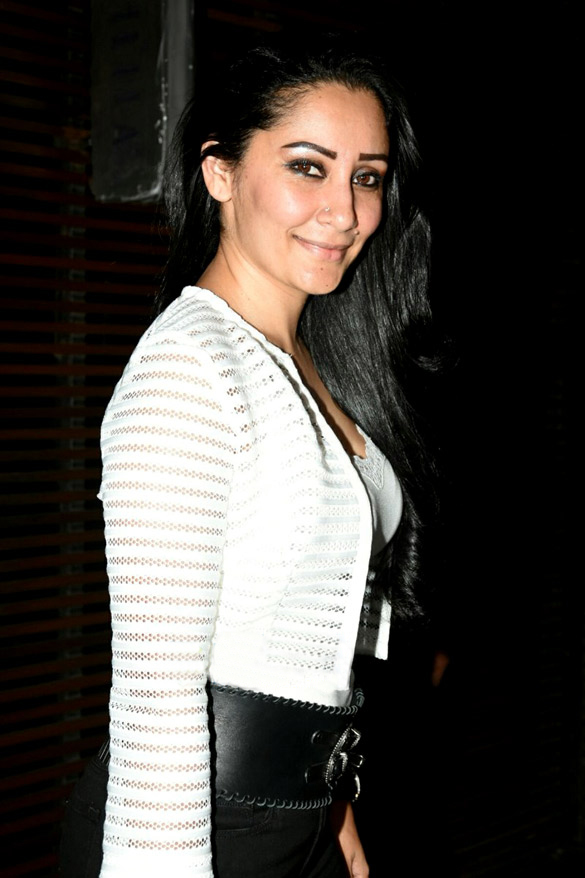
- Maanayata at her birthday bash in 2017
- Born: Dilnawaz Sheikh; 22 July 1978 (age 48); Mumbai, Maharashtra, India
- Occupations: Actress (former); Entrepreneur
- Organization: Sanjay Dutt Productions (CEO)
- Spouse: Sanjay Dutt (m. 2008)
- Children: 2

Maanayata Dutt (née Dilnawaz Sheikh; born 22 July 1978) is an Indian entrepreneur, former actress and the current CEO of Sanjay Dutt Productions. She married Bollywood actor Sanjay Dutt in 2008. She is best known for her item number in Prakash Jha's 2003 film Gangaajal.

== Personal life ==
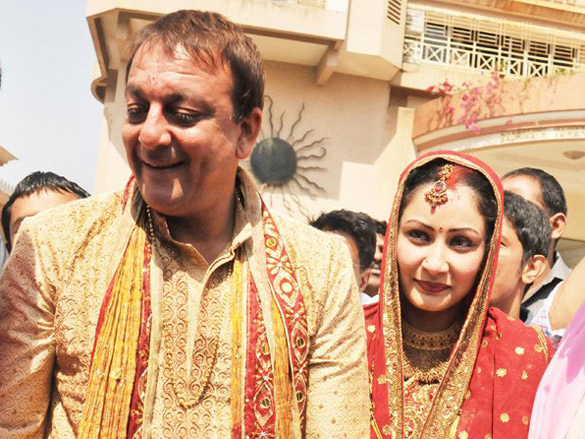
Maanayata Dutt with her husband Sanjay Dutt

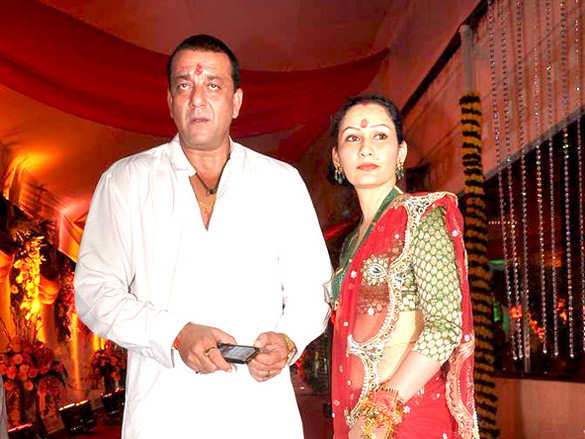
Maanayata Dutt with her husband Sanjay Dutt

Maanayata Dutt was born on 22 July 1978; in Mumbai. She was raised in Dubai. She was known as Sara Khan in the film industry. After her launch in Kamaal Rashid Khan's Deshdrohi in 2008, she was given the screen name "Manyata", by Jha, but her aspirations to become a star ended when her father died, leaving the responsibility of the family business on her.

Maanayata married Sanjay Dutt on 7 February 2008 in a private wedding in Goa. She converted to Hinduism through Arya Samaj rites to validate the marriage before court. Two years later, she became the mother of twins, a boy named Shahraan and a girl named Iqra on 21 October 2010.

== Career ==
Prior to her marriage and before she met Dutt, Maanayata worked in Hindi films, such as Lovers Like Us, opposite actor Nimit Vaishnav. The rights of the film were later purchased by Sanjay Dutt for Rs. 20 lakh.

== In popular culture ==
In the biographical film Sanju, directed by Rajkumar Hirani, which has been released on 29 June 2018, based on the life of Sanjay Dutt, her part has been portrayed by the actress Dia Mirza, while Ranbir Kapoor has portrayed the title role.
