= Sanju =

2018 Indian film by Rajkumar Hirani

- Theatrical release poster
- Directed by: Rajkumar Hirani
- Written by: Abhijat Joshi; Rajkumar Hirani
- Produced by: Vidhu Vinod Chopra; Rajkumar Hirani
- Starring: Ranbir Kapoor; Vicky Kaushal; Paresh Rawal; Anushka Sharma; Manisha Koirala; Sonam Kapoor; Dia Mirza
- Cinematography: Ravi Varman
- Edited by: Rajkumar Hirani
- Music by: Songs: A. R. Rahman; Rohan-Rohan; Vikram Montrose; Background Score: Sanjay Wandrekar; Atul Raninga
- Production companies: Vinod Chopra Films; Rajkumar Hirani Films
- Distributed by: Fox Star Studios
- Release date: 29 June 2018 (India)
- Running time: 161 minutes
- Country: India
- Language: Hindi
- Budget: ₹96 crore
- Box office: ₹586.85 crore

Sanju is a 2018 Indian Hindi-language biographical comedy drama film directed and edited by Rajkumar Hirani, written by Hirani and Abhijat Joshi and produced by Hirani and Vidhu Vinod Chopra under the banners Rajkumar Hirani Films and Vinod Chopra Films. The film chronicles the life of Bollywood actor Sanjay Dutt, notably focusing his drug addiction, arrest for his suspected association with the 1993 Bombay bombings, relationship with his father, and acting career. Ranbir Kapoor stars as the title character with an ensemble supporting cast including Vicky Kaushal, Paresh Rawal, Anushka Sharma, Dia Mirza, Manisha Koirala, Karishma Tanna, Jim Sarbh and Sonam Kapoor.

In a conversation with Hirani, Dutt shared anecdotes from his life, which the former found intriguing and prompted him to make a film based on Dutt's life. It was titled Sanju after the nickname Dutt's mother Nargis used to call him. Principal photography began in January 2017 and wrapped up in January 2018. The film's soundtrack was composed by Rohan-Rohan and Vikram Montrose, with A. R. Rahman as a guest composer. Fox Star Studios acquired the distribution rights of the film.

Sanju was released worldwide on 29 June 2018. It received mixed reviews from critics, who praised Hirani's direction, screenplay, music, cinematography and the performances (particularly those of Kapoor, Kaushal, Rawal, and Koirala), though some criticized its supposed image-cleansing of its protagonist. It registered the highest opening for any film released in India in 2018, and on its third day had the highest single-day collection ever for a Hindi film in India. With a worldwide gross of over ₹587 crore (US$85.83 million), Sanju emerged as the second highest-grossing Indian film of 2018, highest grossing Hindi film of 2018, and the highest-grossing film of Kapoor's career until the release of Animal in 2023. It earned seven nominations at the 64th Filmfare Awards including Best Film and Best Director, winning Best Actor for Kapoor and Best Supporting Actor for Kaushal.

== Plot ==
D. N. Tripathi, an eccentric lyricist, presents a heavily romanticized biography comparing actor Sanjay "Sanju" Dutt to Mahatma Gandhi. A flabbergasted Sanjay rejects the manuscript and has Tripathi thrown out. Concurrently, the Supreme Court of India upholds his's conviction for violating the Arms Act, 1959, arising from the 1993 Bombay bombings, sentencing him to a five-year prison term. Desperate to counter his tarnished public image before his incarceration, Sanjay's wife, Manyata, persuades London-based biographer Winnie Diaz to chronicle his true life story. Though initially skeptical due to a warning from Zubin Mistry, a wealthy builder and Sanjay's former friend, Winnie is won over by Sanjay's unfiltered honesty regarding his chaotic past. She agrees to write the book, triggering a series of chronological flashbacks.

In the early 1980s, stifled by the strict professional oversight of his father, acclaimed filmmaker and politician Sunil Dutt, during the production of his debut film Rocky, Sanjay seeks escape. Zubin, an insidious drug peddler nicknamed "God," exploits his vulnerability by introducing him to severe substance abuse. He becomes profoundly addicted, a dependency that rapidly accelerates when his mother, Nargis, is diagnosed with terminal pancreatic cancer. During her treatment in New York City, Sanjay befriends Kamlesh "Kamli" Kanhaiyalal Kapasi, a loyal fan of his parents. Kamli becomes his emotional anchor, attempting to steer him toward sobriety. However, his worsening addiction causes his disillusioned girlfriend, Ruby, to permanently abandon their relationship. Following Nargis's tragic death just days before Rocky's premiere, a devastated Sanjay finally agrees to enter a rehabilitation center in the United States, successfully achieving sobriety with the support of Sunil and Kamli. Upon returning to India, he violently expels Zubin from his life.

In the 1990s, Sanjay achieves immense box-office success and reinvents himself as an action star. Following the 1992 Babri Masjid demolition and subsequent communal tensions, Sunil receives explicit death threats due to his secular political stance. After a localized assault on Kamli's property, a panicked Sanjay illegally acquires an AK-56 assault rifle from arms traffickers linked to the D-Company underworld solely for familial protection. Following the coordinated 1993 Bombay bombings, local police discover the weapon, arresting Sanjay under the draconian Terrorist and Disruptive Activities (Prevention) Act (TADA). Driven by sensationalist media headlines implying Sanjay's active complicity in trafficking explosives, a disillusioned Kamli severs all ties with him, believing he has betrayed the nation.

Following a lengthy interim prison stint and release in 1995, Sanjay's career suffers from a string of commercial failures. To restore his public standing and morale, Sunil persuades him to accept the lead role in Rajkumar Hirani's Munna Bhai M.B.B.S. (2003). The film's overwhelming success rehabilitates his public image and restores Sunil's pride shortly before his death.

In 2006, the judiciary formally clears Sanjay of all terrorism-related charges under TADA but maintains his conviction under the Arms Act for illegal weapon possession. When his final appeal is rejected in 2013, Sanjay utilizes his remaining days of freedom to reconcile with Winnie and Kamli. Guided by Manyata, he presents verified evidence exposing how speculative, unverified tabloid journalism systematically distorted legal facts to brand him a terrorist. Convinced of his patriotism, a remorseful Kamli reconciles with him.

Upon his definitive release from prison in 2016, Sanjay discovers that Winnie has completed his biography, titled Kuch Toh Log Kahenge. Reunited with Manyata and Kamli, Sanju publicly embraces his flawed legacy, imploring his children to emulate the integrity of their grandfather, Sunil, rather than his own.

== Cast ==
- Ranbir Kapoor as Sanjay "Sanju" Dutt
  - Kapoor also appears as himself in the end credits for the titular song "Baba Bolta Hai Bas Ho Gaya"
  - Sanjay Dutt as himself in the end credits for the titular song "Baba Bolta Hai Bas Ho Gaya"
- Vicky Kaushal as Kamlesh "Kamli" Kanhaiyalal Kapasi
- Paresh Rawal as Sunil Dutt
- Anushka Sharma as Winnie Diaz
- Dia Mirza as Manyata Dutt
- Manisha Koirala as Nargis Dutt
- Karishma Tanna as Pinky Joshi
- Jim Sarbh as Zubin Mistry
- Sonam Kapoor as Ruby Irani (based on Tina Munim)
- Aditi Gautam as Priya Dutt
  - Ashnoor Kaur as young Priya
- Shivani Mahajan as Namrata Dutt
  - Kaashish Vohra as young Namrata
- Sayaji Shinde as Bandu Dada, an underworld don, based on Ravi Pujari
- Piyush Mishra as Dinesh Narayan "DN" Tripathi, a lyricist
- Yuri Suri as Advocate Hawant Singh
- Ashwin Mushran as an Event Manager
- Aanjjan Srivastav as a Minister
- Prakash Belawadi as Kamal Kishore "KK" Arora
- Deepak Rai as Barber
- Boman Irani as Captain Homi Irani (cameo appearance)
  - Irani also appears as Dr. Jagdish Chandra "JC" Asthana from Munna Bhai M.B.B.S. in archive footage
- Tabu as herself (cameo appearance)
- Mahesh Manjrekar as himself (cameo appearance)
- Arshad Warsi as "Circuit" from Munna Bhai M.B.B.S. (archive footage)
- Anil Charanjeet in the song "Main Badiya Tu Bhi Badiya" (special appearance)

== Production ==
=== Development ===
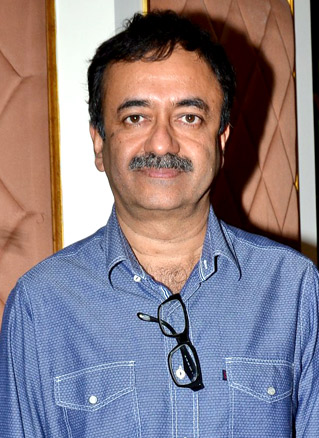
Hirani (pictured in 2014)

Director Rajkumar Hirani was first prompted to create a film based on Sanjay Dutt's life by the latter's wife Manyata Dutt in a casual conversation, an offer he refused, reasoning that "Sanju’s world is very different from my world". In an interview with Daily News & Analysis, Hirani revealed what eventually prompted him to create a film based on Sanjay Dutt's life: "He was lonely. Manyata (I think) was in the hospital and he used to go there (sometimes) and then come home to an empty house. So, he was just venting, speaking straight from the heart. And, he started giving me anecdotes that were just gems for a filmmaker". In regards to gaining resources in constructing the film, Hirani said, "...we sat for a crazy amount of time and recorded everything ... I also met others who knew him — journalists, cops, relatives and friends. I felt there was a movie that should be told." In an interview with DNA After Hrs, Hirani confirmed that the film was named Sanju after a lot of deliberation as Nargis, Sanjay's mother, used to call him ‘Sanju’.

Producer Vidhu Vinod Chopra was not a part of the project when Hirani initially approached him to produce the film. At first, Chopra was of the opinion that "it was hogwash... but when we started researching all that he’s said — from the 308 girlfriends he had to how he begged on the streets of US for the money to buy a bus ticket — we realised that everything he had told us was true!". Hirani had a pre-condition with Dutt that if the latter requested to change any lines or scenes, he "would not make it", upon which Dutt allowed Hirani to make the film in his accord. He was okay with Hirani not glorifying him in the film. Hirani showed aspects of Dutt's life that the public would not have known, such as "what was happening in the Dutt household when Sanju was accused of the crime? What was his father going through? What was happening with his sisters? How were his friends reacting? Later I met his sisters, Namrata and Priya, brother-in-law Kumar Gaurav and US-based friend Paresh Ghelani." Hirani stated, "The film is not about his romance. It has primarily two tracks, one is the gun story and the other is the drugs story and how he fought these two battles."

Speaking about Dutt's journey, Kapoor revealed in an interview with Filmfare that the biopic will reach out to the audience by teaching them something. He stated that "It will talk about human flaws, the emotional father-son story (between Sanjay and the late Sunil Dutt), his relationship with his best friend, with the women in his life. It's emotional, it's funny, it's sad, it's bittersweet. The youth have a lot to learn from his mistakes." He also confirmed that "it's not a propaganda film" intending to glorify Dutt. Kapoor also revealed that for him the hardest aspect of playing the role was to give himself the confidence to go ahead with the project. For him, Sanjay Dutt is "a flawed but a wonderful person... a pop icon" and that's why it was scary. Kapoor also stated that there are "six different phases, six different looks and six different controversies" in the film.

In an interview with Rajeev Masand, Hirani disclosed that the story-telling procedure was "challenging as it's not a story of an achiever" as most biopics are based on a heroic personality, yet Dutt is known for his tragedies and losses. He noted that "you can't really tamper" and that the main scripting challenge was fitting "a very anecdotal story in a structured format". Writer Abhijat Joshi also revealed that there was no "deliberate" attempt to make Dutt's character sympathetic to the audience. Instead the team realized having listened to all the anecdotes conveyed by Dutt that it's a "very engaging, incredibly fascinating" story based on a "conflicted person, a flawed person" who "deserved empathy". Hirani then confirmed that he has "put out the truth" which includes "good things and bad things". In another interview, Hirani also revealed that like his other films, Sanju would also deliver a social message: "there is the father-son story, a friendship and one is a question mark. For the last one, you’ll have to see the film. Hirani also revealed that he did initially get "attracted to all the anecdotes [that Dutt was conveying]" but soon "realized it was not enough – we had to be able to string it all together." which led him to come to the conclusion that "people need to know is his gun story [and his drug story], because it is important. If there is no gun story, there is no biopic" which then in turn formed the "spine" of the film."

Post the release of the film, both Hirani and Joshi reasoned that Dutt has not been "whitewashed" in the film as many critics have openly said so. Instead, Hirani questioned, "I want to know what have I whitewashed? I have shown that he had 308 girlfriends, that he was so addicted to drugs, he slept with his friend’s girlfriend. Is this whitewashing?". Joshi also commented that "What we are bashing is a certain section which sensationalizes things and uses a question mark to make things ‘chatpata’ (spicy). That has been critiqued, and I am amazed there has been no introspection on that side. No one has even said that it happens."

=== Casting ===
Actor Ranbir Kapoor was Hirani's first choice to play Dutt's character. Hirani stated, "I first thought of Ranbir and went straight to him and I can tell you, we were right." He also stated that he thought Kapoor is a fantastic actor and "at the perfect age." He further revealed the similarities and differences between Dutt and Kapoor stating that "they have lived the life of actors all through. Ranbir is not someone from outside the industry who came here to be a hero. In a sense, it was easier for me to see him as Sanju." He also revealed that Ranbir Kapoor worked very hard to get the correct physicality, spending days watching videos "to strike the right balance". Initially Kapoor was reluctant to portray the role. However, he agreed once "he saw the angle of the story" and that the story "broke certain notions I had about him [Dutt]". Kapoor also revealed that his initial "hesitation" about playing Dutt's role was that he is "still so relevant today" and is a "superstar" who is "working in movies today... [and] has lots to achieve and lots to do".

Chopra was also reluctant to produce the film with Kapoor in the lead role, as he believed Ranveer Singh would've been a better fit to Dutt's part by having the "flamboyance, the emotional depth as well as the ability to change himself completely to play Sanjay Dutt." Chopra however, "had to kind of eat [his] words" once shooting began and he witnessed Kapoor's capabilities playing Dutt. Kapoor responded to Chopra's comments by stating that he was "very happy" to be a part of the film as it came at a time when "he was really in need of inspiration." Like Kapoor, Koirala was also "scepital" about playing a mother to Kapoor due to the fear of being "typecast."

Aamir Khan was also approached to play the role of Dutt's father, Sunil Dutt. However, the role was turned down as Khan was already playing the role of a father at that time in Dangal (2016). Khan had also stated that he wished to have played Dutt's role instead as his "role is so wonderful that it won my heart... so don’t offer me any other role as I won’t be able to do it". The role was then passed onto actor Paresh Rawal who stated that his character is "human" and "doesn't have a set mannerism, idiosyncrasy".

Initial reports suggested that actress Anushka Sharma was approached to play the character of one of Dutt's girlfriends, and then a rumoured journalist. However, Sharma denied these claims by stating that "my character is the only fictional character in the film" and "is not based on any living person". At the trailer launch, Hirani stated that Sharma plays a biographer from London who comes to India, and in turn plays a "mix" of himself and Abhijat Joshi.

Speaking on his role, Vicky Kaushal revealed that his character is an "amalgamation of three or four other friends" of Dutt and is thus "fictionalized". While Karishma Tanna's role is yet unknown, Tanna revealed that it had been intended by Hirani and the rest of the team to keep her role a surprise and that Hirani "made it clear to [her] that [her] role would create a lot of speculation" as it is "exactly what [they] had anticipated." Boman Irani expressed that he was cast as Hirani wanted him to do a special appearance. Speaking about his character, Irani stated that "it's not a known character but may have existed".

It was also reportedly initially that Sonam Kapoor would be playing the character of Tina Munim. Kapoor, however refuted these rumours and stated that "I have a small but important part in the movie. It's not what everyone is thinking. I am not playing an actress." Though, Hirani confirmed that Kapoor is indeed playing the role of "a girlfriend".

=== Characters ===
Ranbir Kapoor requested and was given a month's break between every phase to complete his transformation into Dutt. Speaking about it at the teaser launch of the film, he stated that it was hard for him to look like the muscular Dutt as Kapoor has a thinner frame. "...there was a lot of team effort behind this. A year before that we did a lot of prep and screen tests..." In regards to Kapoor's transformation, father Rishi Kapoor revealed that Ranbir "took 6–7 weeks to get each of his different looks". In an interview, prosthetic artist, Dr Suresh Murkey said that he used prosthetics to make Ranbir Kapoor's face and age resemble Dutt's. Kapoor further commented that he would be sitting for hair and makeup for six hours and "tests after tests [they] kept failing". It was also difficult to develop Dutt's ageing process as "because of alcohol, his face had gotten puffy and his chin had kind of come down." Kapoor however, was also "very clear that if we cannot achieve his look, we will not make the film".

Mirza also opened up on Kapoor's role stating that "he would be the first to reach the location because he would need five, six hours to do prosthetic make-up to play the older part." She also spoke about the uncanny resemblance of Kapoor as Dutt as a consequence of prosthetics revealing that "people who went on the sets thought Ranbir was Sanju sir. Koirala also expressed that she was "shocked at Ranbir's capacity to transform". Hirani also revealed that Kapoor was "meeting Sanju separately...had a full timeline of how Sanju looked in the 80s, 90s, 2000s... and made a whole collection of look videos." Kapoor himself also stated that he "knew that there is a fine line between mimicry and representing someone who is loved by so many people" which is why "it took us six to eight months to get ready... to prep, do the prosthetic tests, acting and character rehearsals."

Kapoor further mentioned that while the physical transformation was significantly easier, emotional transformation and "being able to understand the emotional level of the character was really daunting." However, he also revealed that as Dutt "represents an epitome of body building and if I had to play him on screen, body was essential". To build his body like Dutt's, Kapoor revealed that it required "sacrifice" and "discipline" as he "was having 8 meals a day, waking up at 3 in the morning to drink a protein shake." He also mentioned that he "wanted to take a step back and didn’t want to be around him too much because I didn’t want to be obsessed with him. I would be always looking at him, trying to see what he is doing, how he is scratching his beard, how he is talking…but before any poignant moment in the script, for instance, the jail sequence, the drug sequence, his mother’s death, or when the TADA verdict (Terrorist and Disruptive Activities (Prevention) Act came, I would always call him the night before the shoot. I just wanted to know what he was feeling, and very graciously, very honestly he would tell me and I would express that on screen. I wanted to represent him with respect" and a "true representation of what was going on in his head."

Hairstylist Aalim Hakim revealed that it took "22 days to finalise Ranbir's different avatars" as it was a "challenge" to create the "receding hairline for Ranbir and give him a broad forehead". Costumer designer Ekha Lakani, stated that in regards to Kapoor's costume, she "discussed every look [with Kapoor]... spent hours trying to match every inch; how loose or how fitted it should be" by "matching different body types [as] Sanjay Dutt has had a different body type all throughout his life".

Manisha Koirala who essays the character of Nargis in the film spoke about her transformation as well stating that "we did a couple of tests, from when she had short hair to when she had long hair." Koirala also revealed that she "did a lot of research on Nargisji" by studying "various photographs, books [and] documentary". She also admitted that it was "traumatic" reliving being a cancer patient as Koirala is an ovarian cancer survivor. She further mentioned that "it required a lot of inner strength... but was finally worth it as she tried to "capture [Nargis's] essence, the core of her being". Regarding Koirala's costume, Lakhani stated that Nargis' "iconic images" were taken and she then "recreated a look on that from every curl or twist in the hair to the way the body was or the makeup".

Vicky Kaushal whose "character's name is Kamlesh and is "more like a brother" to Dutt revealed that he "went to Surat to study the body language and mannerism of Gujaratis" as his character, although originally from India has been living in America for the maximum time so "his Gujarati was ought to fade with time." He also revealed that he went through a "huge physical transformation" by losing weight to "look like a lean young Gujarati guy to an aged man of the present time". He also stated that "losing and gaining weight [brought a] change in the body language" which thus enabled him get the "right look" and thus "perform better".

Paresh Rawal expressed that he prepared for his role by trying to "maintain a distance off camera" with Kapoor to "stay true to the character". He further added that "we were not pals who would chat together in between the shots" which went on to embody the real life relationship between Dutt and his father as Sunil Dutt "loved his son to death but never had a friendly equation with [him]". Rawal also stated that he could not "look like Sunil Dutt" following the look tests but had to "portray the emotions, the 'jazba' (passion) that he had for the country, for his family and for his son".

Dia Mirza however, stated that she prepared to play the role of Dutt's wife through "workshops and look tests" but also by studying some of the "news clips released around the time" as well as "her interviews" and "body language". Mirza also stated that she "wanted to understand Maanayata as a wife, woman and mother handled the public scrutiny that she was subjected to". She added that she mainly focussed on "understanding and being honest to the emotion more than anything else." Mirza also revealed that she had to "dye [her] hair jet black" and eventually saw herself as Manyata Dutt once she "placed that mole on my face and saw myself in the mirror" as she saw Maanayata in her "reflection." Mirza, also revealed that Maanayata was a "rock" in Dutt's life and with all "sincerity and honesty [wanted to] understand "what it meant to be a mother and a wife". Talking about the film, Dia told Bollywood Hungama, "It was a springboard for me, it was a lease of life. I really needed it and it's a film that how sometimes you just carry the burden of failed films on your back for too long and then suddenly this 300 crore film that you really you've contributed to in a small way. I think the portrayal of Maanayata was a very small part of Sanju. The mainstay of the story is friendship and the father-son relationship are the people who truly contributed.

On Sonam Kapoor's costume, Lakhani revealed that Kapoor's costume was designed to look like "the girl next door, pretty, giving out very delicate vibes [with] really soft fabrics, pastel hues, delicate embroidery. Kapoor's costume was given "peter pan collars in all her outfits... to make her from that era" except that the team stayed away from making her look like a "fashion diva" but more "real".

Speaking about Sharma's character, Hirani mentioned in an interview that he wanted Sharma to look "like an Indian who stayed in London and [was] brought up there" which then led her to wearing a wig with voluptuous curly hair in the film. Aditi Gautam, who plays Namrata Dutt revealed that she was cast as Hirani thought she looked "exactly like" Dutt. Seiya further mentioned that she prepared for her role by watching interviews that allowed her to gauge on Dutt's "strong personality...[which is also] poised and dignified."

=== Principal photography ===
Shooting for the film began on 12 January 2017 with Ranbir Kapoor, Paresh Rawal, Dia Mirza and other cast and crew. Shooting was wrapped on 21 January 2018. At the wrap party, the cast and crew were seen wearing personalised T-shirts with the hashtag "#duttstheway" to promote the film.

Initially, there were plans to bring Kapoor and Dutt together in the film at the end through a video chat where Dutt would interview Kapoor on his experience and journey. However, these plans were shelved due to both actor's prior commitments. Instead, the film will showcase both actors coming together in the form of a peppy dance number at the end credits. Hirani revealed that the original running time of the film as supposed to be 2 hours and 25 minutes. However, the running time was reduced with an entire song cut out of the film as it "was obstructing the pace of the film and it was breaking the narrative". Hirani further commented on this decision by stating that "if you feel it does not work then you have to let it go."

A replica of Dutt's childhood home which he lived in with his parents took 25 days to complete, as Hirani wanted to portray's Dutt's life right from childhood to present day.

== Music ==
The film's soundtrack features 6 songs composed by A. R. Rahman, Rohan-Rohan and Vikram Montrose while lyrics are written by Irshad Kamil, Shekhar Astitwa, Puneet Sharma, Rohan Gokhale and Abhijat Joshi. The film score is composed by Sanjay Wandrekar and Atul Raninga. Vidhu Vinod Chopra, the film's producer was initially dissatisfied with music and visuals for two songs. Instead of re-shooting the scenes with the songs, they decided to sign A. R. Rahman to compose original songs to fit in the same scenes. Rahman was hired as a guest composer and has composed two songs for the movie including "Ruby Ruby", with lyrics penned by his regular collaborator Irshad Kamil. The soundtrack album was released by T-Series on 29 June 2018.

== Marketing and release ==
A short official teaser of the film was released on 24 April 2018, and is available online on Netflix and Hotstar. It became the highest viewed Hindi film teaser of all time, garnering more than 30 million views within the first 48 hours of its release and 150 million global views across several social media platforms. The marketing campaign of the film started with the teaser launch which appeared on "a roadblock on 80 channels across the Star network for the teaser launch, cashing in on the Indian Premier League traffic on TV as well as its streaming app Hotstar". The official trailer was released on 30 May 2018 and accumulated over 20 million views within its first 24 hours of release.

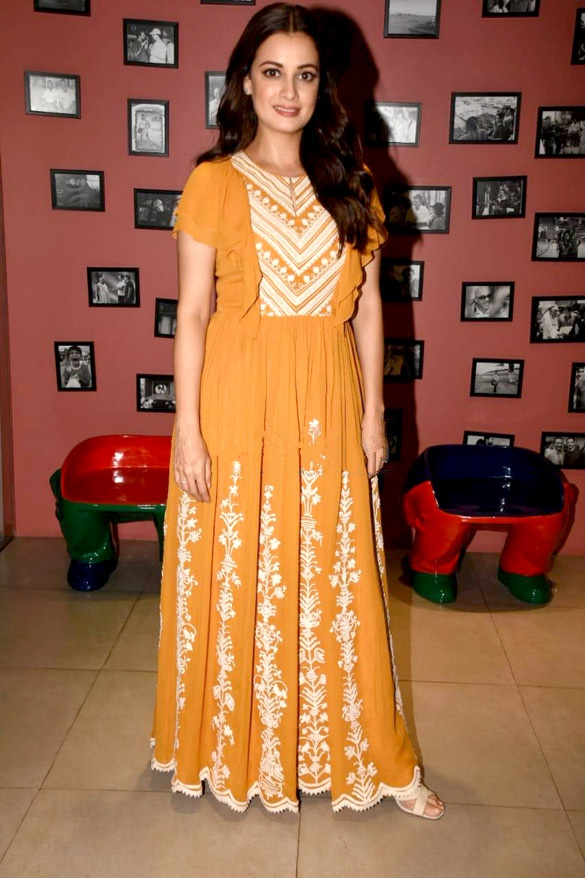
Mirza promoting the film

The first poster was released on 30 April 2018 in which Kapoor looked as Sanjay Dutt when he first came out of jail in 2016. The next day, another poster was released showcasing another still of Kapoor as Dutt in 2016 leaving Yerwada jail. Subsequently, more posters were released portraying Kapoor as Dutt from the 90s and 2003 when the films Rocky and Munna Bhai M.B.B.S were released respectively. On 7 May, Hirani released another poster. Hirani then announced that he would now release poster stills of the rest of the cast and crew until the trailer release date.

On 25 May, Hirani released a still of "Sanju's crazy romantic love life" on Twitter presenting Kapoor and Sonam Kapoor. The next day a still of Kapoor was released presenting Paresh Rawal who play's Dutt's father. Following this, a still of actor Vicky Kaushal was released confirming his role as Dutt's best friend in USA. Hirani released a still of Anushka Sharma the day after but did not reveal her role, as he intended for the trailer to do so instead. At the trailer launch Hirani told that the character of Anushka Sharma is actually a comprised role of him and the writer, Abhijat Joshi showing that how they both collected the whole story about Sanjay Dutt . A still of Manisha Koirala playing Nargis was also released by Hirani. After that, Rajkumar Hirani had released the last poster in which, Dia Mirza was seen as Manyata Dutt.

Hirani released postcard stills of two prominent elements of the film and Dutt's life: the first showed a still of Kapoor begging on the streets in order to buy a bus ticket to meet a friend, whilst the second presented him at the premiere of his debut film Rocky, just three days after losing his mother to cancer. Aside from poster releases, marketing was also successful through "Sanju-style lip sync and face filters and post videos to win prizes" across social media. Actress Karishma Tanna also released a still of herself with Kapoor and Kaushal on 20 June, confirming that she would be appearing in the film in a "fun song" with the two actors. On 19 July, the song was released as Bhophu Baj Raha Hai which didn't make it to the final cut, though was released promotionally on YouTube.

On Father's Day, the makers released second teaser of the film, starring a clip of Kapoor and Rawal essaying the father-son bond between Dutt and his father. The clip was promoted along with the hashtag "#JaaduKiJhappi" (the magic of a hug), a line made famous by Sanjay in Munna Bhai M.B.B.S. A third teaser of the film was released on 22 June presenting Kapoor playing Dutt as Munna Bhai. Kapoor also promoted the film by making a rare appearance on social media as he took over the Twitter handle of Fox Star studios and was involved in a live tweet session with fans and shared personal childhood pictures of himself during Father's Day.

Shikha Kapur, CEO of Fox Star Studios stated that the marketing "objective was to build conversations and scale" without [defining the film's] target group by age and geography but by affinities and behaviours online. She further mentioned that the "crux of the marketing narrative" was that the film is "of a man who lived many lives in one life and a story that is so unbelievable that you almost want to pinch yourself and ask if it really happened". Saurabh Uboweja, international brand expert and CEO of Brands of Desire, stated that [the marketing campaign is about] "the ability to engage, crack some jokes and have fun backed by very strong messaging" which is why "less than 10%" of budgeting has been spent on marketing compared to a usual big-ticket Bollywood film that would spend 20–25% on. He also mentioned that "making Dutt appear flawed, yet sensitive and relatable is also a means to reach out to a generation for which the actor is past his prime" and to "drive entire families" out to watch the film.

Activist Prithvi Mhaske raised objection over the toilet leakage scene shown in the trailer of the film through a letter sent to the Central Board of Film Certification (CBFC). The letter stated that "the government and authorities are taking a very well care of all the barracks of the jails" indicating that "this particular scene will make a bad impression about the jails and jail authorities of the Indians". On 25 June, it was reported that the censor board had cleared the film and finalised it for release in India. There has been one scene involving the overflowing toilet from Dutt's jail cell to be removed and a few dialogues. Social activist Gaurav Gulati also filed to the National Commission for Women believing the film "contains derogatory words for women" to which sex worker's "identity [is] being demeaned". Despite being cleared by the censor board in India, the film was granted a 15 certificate in Great Britain due to "drug references, drug misuse, infrequent strong sex references."

== Box office ==
=== India ===
Sanju has a final worldwide gross of ₹586.85 crore (US$85.81 million). Advance bookings for the film began on 24 June. It was released across 4000 screens in India, and over 1300 screens overseas.

The film opened to an occupancy of 85% in the domestic theatres. It collected ₹34.75 crore (US$5.08 million) nett on its opening day at the domestic box office, which was the highest for all films released in India in 2018. The film became Hirani's highest opening ever surpassing ₹26.63 crore (US$3.89 million) collected by PK in 2014. It recorded the highest second day collection ever for a Hindi film domestically. It collected over ₹46.71 crore (US$6.83 million) nett on its third day, setting the record for the highest single day collecting ever for a Hindi film in India, surpassing Baahubali 2: The Conclusion's dubbed Hindi nett, while also becoming the highest weekend earner of the year. The film entered the 100 crore club in nett domestically within its first three days of release. Despite it being a non-holiday and with reduced tickets, the film collected ₹25.35 crore (US$3.71 million) nett on its first Monday. Within its first week of release, Sanju had entered the 200 crore club. It also became the highest first week grosser of 2018, the fourth highest week of all time and also became the first Hindi film to have a non-holiday release and yet still earn over 200 crores in its first week of running. Therefore, Sanju also became Kapoor's first film to earn over 200 crore.

In its second weekend, the film earned ₹12.50 crore (US$1.83 million) on Friday, ₹21.50 crore (US$3.14 million) on Saturday and ₹28 crore (US$4.09 million) on Sunday. The film thus entered the 250 crore club within 10 days of release. The film also recorded the fourth highest second grossing week of all time, with approximately ₹90 crore (US$13.16 million). As of the end of its second week run, Sanju had grossed ₹500.43 crore (US$73.17 million) globally.

In its third weekend, the film entered the 300 crore club and became Kapoor's first film and the 7th film of all time to reach this milestone. The film also surpassed the domestic lifetime collections of the ₹302.15 crore (US$44.18 million) earned by Padmaavat to become the highest grossing domestic nett collector of 2018 and the 9th highest-grossing Indian films of all time The film thus registered the highest third week collections of 2018 as well. By its third Tuesday, Sanju's domestic total reached ₹321.57 crore (US$47.02 million). The film therefore surpassed the lifetime domestic collections of ₹320.34 crore (US$46.84 million) collected by Bajrangi Bhaijaan to become the fifth highest grossing Hindi film of all time.

The film's fourth week total was approximately ₹10.48 crore (US$1.53 million) and ₹337.28 crore (US$49.32 million) overall. Sanju thus surpassed the lifetime domestic net collections of Tiger Zinda Hai and PK to become the third highest-grossing film (nett) of all time.

=== Overseas ===
The film opened overseas with an estimated collection of ₹1.32 crore (US$193,012.09) in Australia, ₹3,300,000 (US$35,000) in New Zealand, ₹1.19 crore (US$174,003.32) in United Kingdom, and ₹1.11 crore (US$162,305.62) in the United States. Sanju debuted at number 8 at the US box office in the opening weekend, earning more than Avengers: Infinity War and Solo: A Star Wars Story in the same week on a comparatively lower number of 356 screens. Its opening week collection was US$2.5 million. The film also opened to an earning of Rs. 32 million in Pakistan. In Dubai, the government allowed cinemas to remain open for 24 hours on Friday and Saturday to prevent crowd frenzy, causing shows to start as early as 4:30 am. In the GCC, the film opened to earnings of ₹6.19 crore (US$905,109.7), along with a collection of ₹34.90 crore (US$5.1 million) in Norway. Overseas, the film has garnered ₹122 crore (US$17.84 million) as of two weeks of its initial release. CEO of Fox Star Studios, Vijay Singh went on to confirm that Sanju was the biggest Indian "film ever for Pakistan and Australia and the second biggest for US." Due to popular demand, Singh also confirmed that Sanju will be released in China.

== Critical reception ==
On the review aggregator website Rotten Tomatoes, 41% of 17 critics' reviews are positive, with an average rating of 6.4/10.

=== India ===
Sanju received mostly positive reviews from critics, with particular praise for Kapoor and Kaushal's performances and Hirani's direction. Swetha Ramakrishnan of Firstpost praised the performances of the cast, especially Kapoor, further writing, "the film doesn't attempt to decode Sanjay Dutt or justify his life. Neither does it try to whitewash his flaws." Taran Adarsh of Bollywood Hungama gave the film four and a half stars out of five and wrote, "Sanju is an entertaining saga that blends emotions, humour and drama in adequate doses. It is powerful, engaging, emotional as well as compelling". Meena Iyer of Daily News and Analysis similarly rated the film four and a half stars out of five, stating that "it’s an emotional roller-coaster that will give you the satisfaction of having read a bestseller." Divya Solgama of Bollywood Times gave the film 4.5/5 stars stating that "Sanju’ is an emotionally enriching experience which every cinema lover should witness".

Rachit Gupta of The Times of India rated the film four stars out of five and commented, "Whether he’s dancing like a hysterical man under the influence of drugs or he’s the broken, emotional wreck just staring blank, Ranbir portrays a variety of emotions and grey shades with flair." Saibal Chatterjee of NDTV praised Kapoor's performance and Hirani's direction, but felt that "other actors scramble to keep up", especially Rawal. He concludes the review by writing, "an absolute must-watch". A reviewer for India Today writes, "Director Rajkumar Hirani, who has also co-written and edited Sanju, has taken more than a few dramatic liberties, but it feels refreshingly candid." He appreciates Kaushal as "[holding] his own against Ranbir's superlative performance."

Devesh Sharma of Filmfare appreciated the film's humour and applauded the writing as "the strength of the film". He noted, "Sanju tells you superstars are humans too". Gaurang Chauhan of Times Now rated the film three and a half stars out of five. While criticising the background score and the first half, he praised the performances and second half of the film. Ankita Chakravarti of Zee News praised the performances of the ensemble cast stating that "each and every cast is worth every attention" as "all the actors have done complete justice to their characters." Rajeev Masand, writing for News18, gave the film three and a half stars out of five, believing that the "shrewd writing, and Ranbir Kapoor’s extraordinary performance makes it hard not to empathize with the protagonist." Rohit Bhatnagar of Deccan Chronicle labelled Sanju as "enjoyable", while noting that it tries to clear Dutt's image.

Uday Bhatia of Mint was critical of Dutt's portrayal, while mostly appreciating Kapoor's performance. Rohit Vats of Hindustan Times appreciated Kapoor's performance, but criticized the predictable nature of the script and songs which "break the narrative". Shubhra Gupta of Indian Express rated the film two and a half stars out of five, stating that "Hirani is in top form getting all his reel characters to off the real characters, in the pursuit of a solid, entertaining tale" but criticized the second half as to whether what had been left out of the film would have made it better. Anna M. M. Vetticad of Firstpost described Kapoor's performance as "superb", but was unhappy with how "startlingly dishonest" the film was. Nandini Ramanath of Scroll.in was impassive about the film, writing, "In its relentless quest to offer absolution, Sanju is no better or worse than many other biopics that have flooded Bollywood over the past few years."

=== Overseas ===
Lisa Tsering of The Hollywood Reporter gave the film 3.5/5 and stated that while "Sanju grabs the viewer's attention and delivers performances that glow long after the film is over" felt that the film was "a glorified infomercial about the life of a Bollywood bad boy." Similarly, Mike McCahill of The Guardian criticised how "this three hour hagiography simply blames everyone else for his troubles" though praised Kapoor for being "a lightweight film’s strongest suit". Shilpa Jamkhandikar of Reuters similarly praised Kapoor stating that what is "bearable is Hirani’s leading man and his chameleon-like ability to transform himself into various avatars" and also criticized the script as it "stretches too long and resorts to melodrama over substance". Mary Gayen of The National however praised the film giving it 3.5/5 stars, stating that Hirani's "direction is very matter of fact in relation to the incidents, but very thorough with the feelings expressed by the main characters." Vikran Mathur of American Bazaar also praised the film stating that the "team has weaved Sanju’s story together beautifully as a cinematic experience". Danish Lakdawaala of Dubai Desi gave the film 3.5/5 stars praising the "very well written and entertaining screenplay packed with powerful performance" but criticized it being "like a propaganda film rather than a biopic, where audience is slapped with the key message through out which was to clear Sanjay Dutt's name." Divesh Mirchandani of C'est Le Cinema writes that the "biggest takeaway from the film is that the director chooses not to give a clean chit to his long time colleague, and offers no justification for the actor's missteps" by giving the film 3/5 stars.

=== Accolades ===
Date of ceremony	Awards	Category	Recipient(s) and nominee(s)	Result	Ref.
10 August 2018	Indian Film Festival of Melbourne	Best Film	Sanju	Won	
10 August 2018	Indian Film Festival of Melbourne	Best Director	Rajkumar Hirani	Won	
10 August 2018	Indian Film Festival of Melbourne	Best Actor	Ranbir Kapoor	Nominated	
10 August 2018	Indian Film Festival of Melbourne	Vanguard Award	Ranbir Kapoor	Won	
10 August 2018	Indian Film Festival of Melbourne	Best Supporting Performance (Male/Female)	Vicky Kaushal	Won	
16 March 2019	Asian Film Awards	Best Director	Rajkumar Hirani	Nominated	
16 March 2019	Asian Film Awards	Best Actor	Ranbir Kapoor	Nominated	
16 March 2019	Asian Film Awards	Best Supporting Actor	Vicky Kaushal	Nominated	
16 March 2019	Asian Film Awards	Best Screenplay	Rajkumar Hirani, Abhijat Joshi	Nominated	
16 March 2019	Asian Film Awards	Best Original Music	A. R. Rahman, Rohan-Rohan, Vikram Montrose	Nominated	
19 March 2019	Zee Cine Awards	Best Film	Sanju	Nominated	
19 March 2019	Zee Cine Awards	Best Actor	Ranbir Kapoor	Won	
19 March 2019	Zee Cine Awards	Best Supporting Actor	Vicky Kaushal	Won	
23 March 2019	Filmfare Awards	Best Film	Vinod Chopra Films, Rajkumar Hirani Films – Vidhu Vinod Chopra, Rajkumar Hirani	Nominated	
23 March 2019	Filmfare Awards	Best Director	Rajkumar Hirani	Nominated	
23 March 2019	Filmfare Awards	Best Actor	Ranbir Kapoor	Won	
23 March 2019	Filmfare Awards	Best Actor (Critics)	Ranbir Kapoor	Nominated	
23 March 2019	Filmfare Awards	Best Supporting Actor	Vicky Kaushal	Won	
23 March 2019	Filmfare Awards	Best Lyricist	Shekhar Astitva for "Kar Har Maidaan Fateh"	Nominated	
23 March 2019	Filmfare Awards	Best Choreography	Ganesh Archarya for "Main Badhiya Tu Bhi Badhiya"	Nominated	
18 September 2019	IIFA Awards	Best Picture	Vinod Chopra Films, Rajkumar Hirani Films – Vidhu Vinod Chopra, Rajkumar Hirani	Nominated	
18 September 2019	IIFA Awards	Best Director	Rajkumar Hirani	Nominated	
18 September 2019	IIFA Awards	Best Actor	Ranbir Kapoor	Nominated	
18 September 2019	IIFA Awards	Best Supporting Actor	Vicky Kaushal	Won	
18 September 2019	IIFA Awards	Best Story	Abhijat Joshi, Rajkumar Hirani	Nominated	
18 September 2019	IIFA Awards	Best Male Playback Singer	Sukhwinder Singh for "Kar Har Maidaan Fateh"	Nominated	
18 September 2019	IIFA Awards	Best Female Playback Singer	Sunidhi Chauhan for "Main Badhiya Tu Bhi Badhiya"	Nominated	
