= Barfi! =

2012 Indian film by Anurag Basu

- Theatrical release poster
- Directed by: Anurag Basu
- Written by: Anurag Basu
- Dialogues by: Sanjeev Datta
- Produced by: Ronnie Screwvala; Siddharth Roy Kapur
- Starring: Ranbir Kapoor; Priyanka Chopra; Ileana D'Cruz
- Cinematography: Ravi Varman
- Edited by: Akiv Ali
- Music by: Pritam
- Production company: UTV Motion Pictures
- Distributed by: UTV Motion Pictures
- Release date: 14 September 2012
- Running time: 150 minutes
- Country: India
- Language: Hindi
- Budget: ₹35 crore
- Box office: ₹175 crore

Barfi! is a 2012 Indian Hindi-language romantic comedy film written and directed by Anurag Basu, and produced by Ronnie Screwvala and Siddharth Roy Kapur under UTV Motion Pictures. The first UTV project to be released under the Disney·UTV brand, the film stars Ranbir Kapoor, Priyanka Chopra and Ileana D'Cruz (in her Hindi film debut) with Saurabh Shukla, Ashish Vidyarthi, Jisshu Sengupta, Roopa Ganguly and Haradhan Bandopadhyay in supporting roles. Set in Darjeeling, Kolkata and Jalandhar of the 1970s, the film focuses on Barfi (Kapoor), a deaf-mute young man based in Darjeeling, and his relationships with two girls, the beautiful Shruti (D'Cruz) and the autistic Jhilmil (Chopra).

Made on a budget of ₹35 crore, Barfi! was released on 14 September 2012. The film received widespread critical acclaim for the cast performances, direction, screenplay, cinematography, music and the portrayal of physically disabled people. It was a major commercial success, becoming one of the highest-grossing films of 2012 in India and overseas, grossing ₹175 crore worldwide. Since its release, Barfi! is remembered for its refreshing story, soundtrack, performances of the cast, and feel-good factor.

The film was selected as India's official entry for the Best Foreign Language Film nomination for the 85th Academy Awards. Barfi! won several awards and nominations at various award ceremonies across India. At the 58th Filmfare Awards, Barfi! received 12 nominations including Best Director (Basu), Best Actress (Chopra) and Best Supporting Actress (D'Cruz), and won 7 awards including Best Film, Best Actor (Kapoor), Best Female Debut (D'Cruz) and Best Music Director (Pritam).

== Plot ==
In 1972 in Darjeeling, Murphy, universally known as Barfi, is a charming and optimistic young man born deaf and mute. Raised by his father, Jungbahadur, a humble chauffeur, after his mother's death during childbirth, Barfi develops into a notorious local troublemaker whose whimsical antics frequently leave him fleeing the local police chief, Inspector Sudhanshu Dutta. Barfi's life changes when he crosses paths with Shruti Ghosh, an educated young woman who has recently arrived in town. Although Shruti is engaged to be married, she quickly falls in love with the smitten Barfi. Her mother intervenes, warning her that Barfi’s lack of wealth and physical disabilities would make a stable future impossible. Reluctantly yielding to her mother's pragmatism, Shruti breaks off contact, marries her fiancé, and leaves Darjeeling.

Sometime later, Jungbahadur suffers from severe kidney failure, leaving Barfi desperate to raise ₹7,000 for his life-saving surgery. Following a botched, chaotic attempt to rob a local bank, Barfi turns to a desperate alternative: kidnapping his autistic childhood friend, Jhilmil Chatterjee, who is the wealthy heiress to her grandfather's fortune. When Barfi arrives at her estate, he discovers that Jhilmil has already been abducted by professional criminals, prompting her corrupt father, Durjoy, to arrange a ₹50,000 ransom. While evading Inspector Dutta after the bank robbery, Barfi spots Jhilmil trapped inside a getaway van. He sneaks aboard, drives the van away, and shelters Jhilmil in his apartment. Barfi issues a scaled-down ransom note for ₹7,000 to Durjoy, collects the cash, and races to the hospital, only to discover that his father passed away just before the payment could be processed. Devastated, Barfi attempts to leave Jhilmil at her old caretaker’s village, but she adamantly refuses to leave his side. Recognizing her deep emotional attachment to him, Barfi takes Jhilmil to Kolkata, assuming full responsibility for her well-being.

In 1978, Barfi and Shruti happen to cross paths and reunite in Kolkata. Shruti, trapped in an unhappy marriage, rekindles her close bond with Barfi. This sudden intimacy triggers intense anxiety and jealousy in Jhilmil, who abruptly vanishes into the sprawling city. When a frantic Shruti files a missing person report, Inspector Dutta tracks the lead from Darjeeling, leading to Barfi's immediate arrest under suspicion of foul play. Shruti's relentless efforts to legally defend Barfi estrange her husband, who permanently abandons her. During Barfi's interrogation, a new ransom demand is made in Darjeeling, and Jhilmil is seemingly killed during a botched exchange, though her body is never recovered. Inspector Dutta is deeply perplexed as to why a ransom note would materialize in Darjeeling for a girl who had been residing secretly in Kolkata for over half a decade. Eager to close the high-profile case, the police administration prepares to frame Barfi for Jhilmil's murder. However, Inspector Dutta, who has grown genuinely fond of Barfi over years of investigation, quietly releases him to Shruti, urging them to start over. Shruti complies, secretly hoping that with Jhilmil gone, she can finally build a life with Barfi.

Barfi, however, is completely broken by Jhilmil’s absence, rendering his life with Shruti empty and unfulfilled. Driven by intuition, he deciphers Jhilmil's old wall scribbles to locate her childhood care home. He takes Shruti along to investigate, leading to a major revelation: Jhilmil is alive. Her initial abduction had been staged by her own father to embezzle money from her trust fund. In the second instance, Jhilmil's father colluded with the caretakers of her former foster home to fake her death. This allowed Jhilmil to return to a safe environment away from her abusive, alcoholic mother, while her father successfully liquidated the remaining estate left behind by her late grandfather. Witnessing their profound bond, Shruti steps aside as Barfi and Jhilmil happily reunite and marry, spending the rest of her life alone but finding solace in their happiness.

In 2012, an elderly Barfi lies dying in a hospital room. Jhilmil arrives at his bedside and climbs in to hold him, and the two pass away peacefully at the exact same moment, completely inseparable in both life and death.

== Cast ==
- Ranbir Kapoor as Murphy (a.k.a. Barfi) who is an optimistic, street-smart, charming young man who was born deaf and mute to a couple in Darjeeling
- Priyanka Chopra as Jhilmil Chatterjee
- Ileana D'Cruz as Shruti Ghosh Sengupta
- Saurabh Shukla as Inspector Sudhanshu Dutta
- Ashish Vidyarthi as Durjoy Chatterjee: Jhilmil's father
- Sumona Chakravarti as Piyali: Shruti's friend
- Jisshu Sengupta as Ranjeet Sengupta: Shruti's fiancé-turned-husband
- Roopa Ganguly as Mrs. Ghosh: Shruti's mother
- Uday Tikekar as Mr. Ghosh: Shruti's father
- Haradhan Bandopadhyay as Daju: Jhilmil's special-care homeowner
- Arun Bali as Nanaji: Jhilmil's maternal grandfather
- Preeti Mamgain as Mrs. Chatterjee: Jhilmil's mother
- Akash Khurana as Jungbahadur Chhetri: Barfi's father
- Kenneth Desai as Senior Inspector
- Rajeev Mishra as Inspector Dutta's assistant
- Bholaraj Sapkota as Bhola: Barfi's friend
- Sujata Sehgal as Ms. D'Souza: founding member of Jhilmil's special-care home

== Production ==
=== Development ===
I tried to make the story linear. But it wasn't working. See, Barfi is a very simple story. If I had kept the narrative linear then I'd have lost my audience. I think if I had removed the non-linear narrative you wouldn't have enjoyed the film. I know Indian viewers get disturbed by non-linear narrations. I wrote Barfi straight. But it was boring that way.

— Anurag Basu, on writing the narrative

During the production of his previous directorial venture Kites (2010), director Anurag Basu wrote a two-page short story which was later developed into the script of Barfi!. The film script that Basu wrote alternated between two time periods, and he retained the nonlinear narrative structure. He said that the script required a 30-year time span for the characters' love to grow and thus set the backdrop of the film in the 1970s.

In June 2010, Anurag Basu confirmed that his film would feature three lead roles, a deaf-mute man, a mentally challenged girl, and a narrator. With former titles like Khamoshi or Silence, media reports said the story was grim or dark. However, Basu stated that on the contrary, the film was happy. According to Basu, he paid homage to Buster Keaton and Charlie Chaplin by adding scenes inspired by the era of silent cinema and using physical comedy in the film, involving silent portions.

=== Casting ===
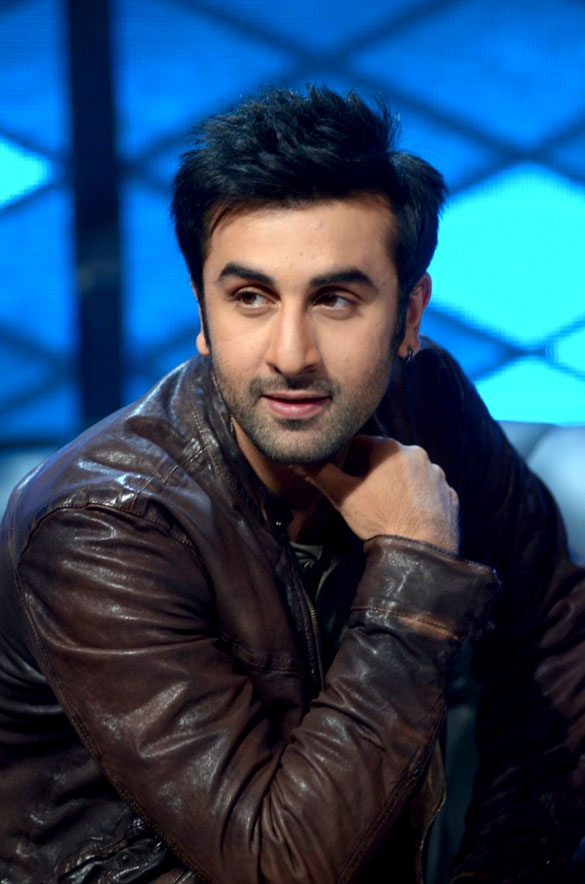
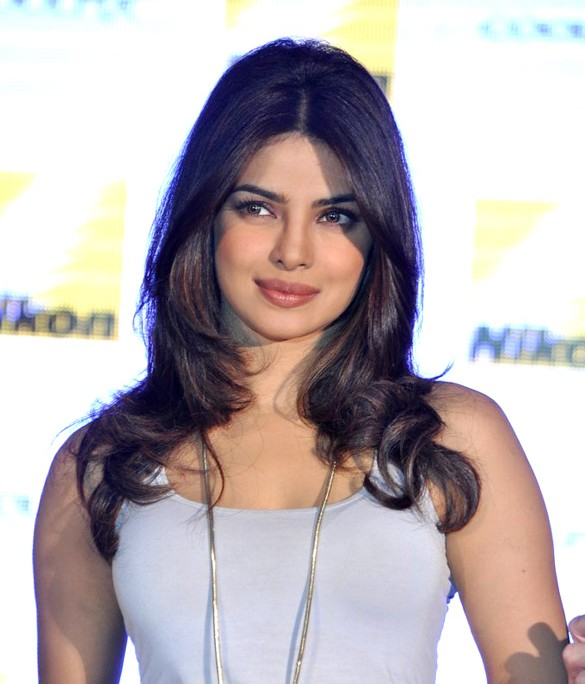
Ranbir Kapoor and Priyanka Chopra played the lead roles

In March 2010, it was reported that Ranbir Kapoor and Asin Thottumkal were signed to play the lead roles in the film before being replaced by Katrina Kaif then titled Khamoshi and later Silence, which Basu confirmed.

Basu wanted to cast Asin Thottumkal for the role of Jhilmil, an autistic girl. Basu's wife, Tani suggested Chopra's name for the role. However, Basu feared that the audience would see "the Priyanka Chopra" and not the character due to Chopra's stardom. Basu explained "I had the fear that I would see Priyanka Chopra in the character and Jhilmil wouldn't work. This has happened in many films where known faces have harmed the character." Priyanka Chopra was cast to play the part but, the development was not announced as Basu wanted to workshop first and see how it goes. After three days of workshop, Basu was convinced that Chopra could play the part and reflected that he was glad that he chose Chopra for the role. Later, Basu revealed that he did not approach any actress after Chopra for the part.

After Chopra was cast in the film, Kaif left the project for unknown reasons. Media reported that she may have opted out of the film because Chopra had been given a stronger role. Later, media reported that Asin Thottumkal was approached to play the role of the narrator once again, replacing Kaif. However, Asin refused the offer due to date clashes. Media reported that no other actress wanted to sign for the film because according to them, Chopra's part was stronger. In July 2010, Mumbai Mirror reported that Chopra was ready to play the role of narrator, so that another actress could be cast in the film as she did not want the film to stall. Basu confirmed this development and said, "It's true we've been unable to cast the other part." After facing several casting problems, Basu chose to cast a completely new fresh face to play the second female role. In early December 2010, Ileana D'Cruz, an actress who worked in Telugu films, was finalised for the second female lead, featuring as narrator and Kapoor's first love interest in the film, thus making her debut in Bollywood with the film.

=== Characters ===
Kapoor played the role of a deaf and mute man in the film. According to Kapoor, he took inspiration from screen legends such as Roberto Benigni, Charlie Chaplin and his grandfather Raj Kapoor. Due to the protagonist's physical disability, Basu did not want to use any sign language but, some behavioural patterns in the film. Kapoor described his character as a regular, happy-go-lucky and good-hearted guy.

Chopra played the role of Jhilmil. Basu described Chopra's role as the "toughest" in the film. To prepare for the role, Chopra visited several mental institutions and spent time with autistic people. She said she had to research a little for the role because in India awareness about autism is very low. Chopra told that she had to let go of every inhibition probably that she had as a Hindi film heroine and play Jhilmil without thinking of it. She explained that she needed two moments to become Jhilmil because she didn't identify with her character due to the difference between her thoughts and behaviour.

D'cruz, who portrayed the narrator and first love interest of the protagonist said "Shruti, is such a sensitive role to play as she goes to different phases in the film."

According to Basu, after Kapoor, Chopra and D'cruz's characters, Saurabh Shukla's character as Inspector Dutta was the most important. Basu described the role as an "amazing" character, who makes others cry when he laughs.

=== Filming ===
Principal photography commenced in March 2011. Barfi! was shot between June 2011 and February 2012, mostly in Darjeeling. In March 2011, Basu visited Kolkata to finalize the locations within the city. Filming in Mumbai began on 20 March 2011 and continued until May 2011. In June 2011, the cast and crew shot in Darjeeling. In December 2011, some scenes were filmed on the outskirts of Coimbatore, especially Pollachi and Ooty. The scenes in which Kapoor's character is chased by policemen over the roof tops were shot in Kolkata at the end of January 2012. Shooting was completed by April 2012, except for some scenes featuring Chopra. The producers postponed the release from 13 July to 31 August 2012 as the September 2011 shooting schedule was cancelled and was waiting to be shot. However, Basu began working on D'Cruz's dubbing portions by end of April 2012, because D'Cruz was unfamiliar with the Hindi language and wanted to learn it whilst filming.

== Soundtrack ==
The music and background score of the film is composed by Pritam, with the lyrics written by Swanand Kirkire, Ashish Pandit, Neelesh Misra and Sayeed Quadri. The soundtrack album has six original songs which was released on 9 August 2012. The soundtrack was influenced by Brazilian Bossa nova. Priyanka Chopra was supposed to sing a track for the film, but her contract with Universal Music prevented her from taking the offer. The soundtrack album also contains a song titled "Fatafati", sung by Pritam Chakraborty, Arijit Singh & Nakash Aziz. which was not used in the film, but the song was released as a promotional single on YouTube on 10 September 2012 with a video which contains some behind-the-scenes footage and the additional vocals are sung by Ranbir Kapoor. The song also has some Bengali lyrics written by Amitabh Bhattacharya.

== Marketing and release ==
The official trailer of the film was launched on 2 July 2012 featuring all the actors. It included no dialogue, portraying comedy through gestures and actions, and was well-received by critics and audiences. Chopra's character was kept under wraps in the trailers as the makers were not willing to reveal much about her character to increase curiosity among the audiences and was only revealed around the release of the film. Shikha Kapur, the executive director (marketing) of UTV explained "Priyanka plays a very special character in Barfi, so we want to keep her mystery intact. In the first trailer, Barfi – played by Ranbir – will be unveiled. We don't plan to reveal Priyanka until the film releases."

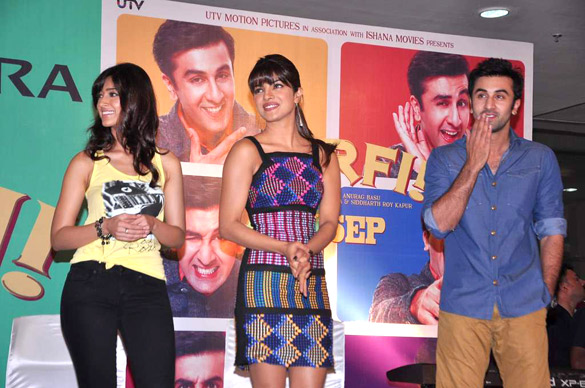
Ileana D'cruz, Priyanka Chopra and Ranbir Kapoor at a promotional event.

UTV Motion Pictures created a YouTube application called The Flavour of Barfi, designed for the marketing the film. The application features Ranbir Kapoor as his character from the film and allows users to type actions, which Kapoor acts out. The application features two zones: one asks users to change Barfi's mood and the other gives users the chance to watch him flirt. The film was promoted in various cities across India. While promoting the film at the Phoenix Mall, Bangalore, the crowds broke through the barricades.

Barfi! The Official Movie Game, a mobile video game based on the film was also released by UTV Indiagames.

Barfi! was released on 14 September 2012 on 1300 screens in 700 theatres in India. Reliance Home Entertainment released Barfi! on DVD and Blu-ray in mid-November 2012 across all regions in a one-disc pack complying with the NTSC format. The DVD and the Blu-ray discs contained bonus content, including making of the film, "Fatafati – Behind The Scenes" and Deleted Scenes. The Video CD version was released at the same time. The exclusive right to broadcast the film was bought by Zee Network and UTV Movies. The deal includes premiere rights of the film along with several other UTV productions. The rights are for seven years, consisting of the premiere (for both channels) of the film. Zee Network will have multiple runs while UTV Movies will have selected run rights. The price of the deal was not revealed by the production company. The film is also available on Netflix. The film was free from premiered on JioHotstar, on 19 July 2025.

In Japan, the film was released in August 2014. It was released on ten screens in six Japanese cities: Tokyo, Yokohama, Nagoya Osaka, Kyoto and Fukuoka.

== Controversies ==
On 12 September 2012, British manufacturer Murphy Radio claimed that its trademark Murphy baby logo from its 1970s print advertisements has been used in Barfi! without permission. Producer Siddharth Roy Kapur said that he had received a legal notice from Murphy but said that there is nothing wrong in the intention, as the brand in question has been shown in a "very positive light".

After the film's release, several blogs and users of social media websites Twitter, Facebook and YouTube accused the director of plagiarism. Media further alleged that Basu had not tried to credit the original sources. Several videos were uploaded to YouTube showing side-by-side comparisons with Hollywood films like Cops, The Adventurer, City Lights, Singin' in the Rain, Project A, The Notebook and Benny & Joon. They also accused Barfi!'s music director Pritam of copying the background music from the French film Amélie.

Basu defended the film by saying that he was inspired by these works and that Barfi! contains an original plot, screenplay, characters and situations. He said that he was paying homages to Keaton and Chaplin. Barfi!'s Oscar selection for Best Foreign Language Film was criticized because of plagiarism, but Oscar selection committee chief Manju Borah defended the film by saying, "Barfi! deserves to be sent outside. The selection was a very open process with three to four rounds of severe discussions and came down to the best film of the final three."

== Reception ==
=== Critical reception ===
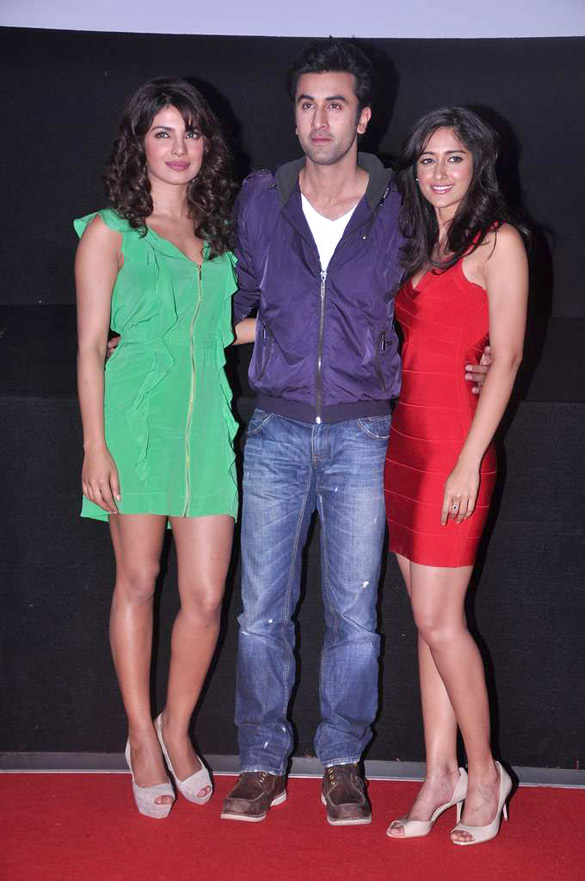
Priyanka Chopra, Ranbir Kapoor, and Ileana D'Cruz received widespread praise for their performances in the film.

Barfi! received widespread critical acclaim upon release, with critics praising the cast performances, direction, screenplay, cinematography, music and the positive portrayal of physically disabled people. Zee News gave the film 5 out of 5 stars and said, "[a]ll in all, Anurag Basu's Barfi! is a perfect sweet treat for his audience. Like it has been discussed, those film-makers who have been portraying the handicapped as dull and boring in their films must take a lesson from Barfi!. Madhureeta Mukherjee of The Times of India gave the film a 4/5 rating and said, "Kapoor, in the most challenging performance of his career leaves us 'dumbstruck'. Without use of conventional crutches of cool-catchphrases, dhamaakedaar-dialogbaazi, bare-bodies, and other 'items'; he stuns you in every single frame. For Chopra, there's only one word – BRAVO! In a role where she needs to under-emote, she does so brilliantly (delivering an incredible performance)."

Roshni Devi of Koimoi said, "Barfi! leaves you with that warm, cuddly, magical feeling with a few tears to match. It's really worth a watch" and gave it an overall score of 3.5 stars out of 5. Taran Adarsh of Bollywood Hungama gave the film 4 out of 5 stars and said, "Barfi is akin to a whiff of fresh air. Its foremost triumph is that it leaves you with a powerful emotion: Happiness!" Indo-Asian News Service gave the film 4 out of 5 stars and said, "Barfi! comes as close to being a modern masterpiece as cinematically possible. To miss it would be a crime. To embrace it is to serenade the sublime". Aniruddha Guha of Daily News and Analysis rated the film 4 out of 5 and remarked that movie "engages you at a personal level", and further added that, "Barfi cannot be missed. It demands patience, but the payoff is incredible".

Pratim D. Gupta of The Telegraph said, "The brilliance of Barfi! is that it's no story and all storytelling. It's about a director at the top of his game orchestrating terrific talent into a bravura crescendo. Only someone who has shown death the door can open windows to life like this." Filmfare gave the film 4 out of 5 stars and stated, "Barfi! is that rare film that can make you smile and make you cry in the same scene. Its technical brilliance is only outdone by its emotional complexity and depth. Pritam's music adds a nice silent-era charm to this already fantastic story, making it an occasion when words simply aren't enough." Raja Sen of Rediff.com has given 3.5/5 stars and wrote, "Barfi! is a well-crafted script with an intriguing back-and-forth narrative but it all goes south towards the end."

Anupama Chopra writing for Hindustan Times gave it 3 out 5 stars and wrote, "[t]his is a film made with love, bolstered by wonderfully etched vignettes, Kapoor and Chopra's stupendous performances and a gorgeous soundtrack by Pritam. And yet, for me, Barfi! was a singularly frustrating experience there was so much to like, but the film never became more than the sum of its parts". Rajeev Masand of CNN-IBN gave 3 out of 5 stars and said, "Barfi! had the potential to be great cinema, but as it stands it's a respectable film that's still better than a lot else you're likely to see." On the contrary, Namrata Joshi of Outlook felt that "The flashback within flashback narrative gets way too clumsy and turgid, the thriller twist absolutely pointless [....] appears much too crafted and self-consciously gorgeous, and feels eminently facile and plastic".

=== Overseas ===
The film received high critical acclaim overseas as well. On the review aggregator website Rotten Tomatoes, 86% of 14 critics' reviews are positive, with an average rating of 7.2/10. Rachel Saltz of The New York Times said, "Bollywood isn't afraid to be mawkish. Barfi! is at times, though not noticeably more so than most Hindi movies, despite its premise of special lovers with a special lesson to teach." Lisa Tsering The Hollywood Reporter called the film "a refreshingly non-commercial exercise" and added that "poignant Bollywood romantic comedy". On the performances of the cast, she wrote, "[...] Basu has guided Kapoor, and especially Chopra, to turn in exceptionally restrained, organic performances."" Ronnie Scheib of Variety wrote, "Unlike Michel Hazanavicus' black-and-white silent homage "The Artist", Basu's film bursts with sound and color; only the speaking- and hearing-impaired Basu is condemned to silence." Gary Goldstein of the Los Angeles Times was more critical of the film, despite praising aspect including "the hard-working cast, a lush score, exotic location shooting and scattered warmth", called it as "more of an endurance test than entertainment."

=== Accolades ===
Barfi! has received various awards and nominations in categories ranging mostly from recognition of the film itself to its direction, screenplay, cinematography, music, to the cast's performances. The film was selected as India's official entry for the Best Foreign Language Film nomination for the 85th Academy Awards. The film received a leading 13 nominations at the 58th Filmfare Awards, and won a leading 7 awards, including Best Film, Best Actor (Kapoor), Best Female Debut (D'Cruz) and Best Music Director (Pritam). Barfi! received a leading 23 nominations at the 19th Screen Awards, winning 9, including Best Director (Basu), Best Actor (Kapoor), and Jodi No. 1 (Kapoor and Chopra). At the 14th Zee Cine Awards, Barfi! received 9 nominations, and won 8 awards, including Best Film, Best Director (Basu) and Best Actress (Chopra).

=== Box office ===
Upon its release, Barfi! started strongly at multiplexes throughout India, with around 80–90% occupancy, but had lower opening takings because of a limited release. The film grossed ₹85.6 million (US$890,000) on its opening day. Its second day saw an increase of around 35% occupancy and collected ₹115 million (US$1.2 million). In its opening weekend, the film grossed ₹340 million (US$3.5 million). In its first week, Barfi! collected ₹565 million (US$5.9 million) nett, and by its eighth day had earned ₹32.5 million (US$340,000) despite the release of Heroine. Barfi! earned ₹150 million (US$1.6 million) in its second weekend. Barfi! had a good second week where it has collected ₹242 million (US$2.5 million) nett. In the third week, the film's takings rose to ₹158 million (US$1.6 million) nett. and it took ₹61.5 million (US$640,000) in its fourth week. During its cinematic release period, Barfi! earned a gross total of ₹1.06 billion (US$11 million) in India. The all-India distributor share of the film was ₹500 million (US$5.2 million). The film became one of the highest-grossing Bollywood films of 2012 in India, and was declared a "Super Hit" after its three-week run by Box Office India. The film went on to gross ₹1.75 billion (US$18 million) worldwide. Internationally, Barfi earned around ₹124 million (US$1.3 million) in its opening weekend, slightly exceeding Raajneeti – which had collected ₹116 million (US$1.2 million) – By the end of its run, Barfi! had grossed $6.25 million outside India, and it became one of the highest overseas grossing Bollywood films of 2012.

== See also ==
- List of submissions to the 85th Academy Awards for Best Foreign Language Film
- List of Indian submissions for the Academy Award for Best Foreign Language Film
