= Ranbir Kapoor =

Indian actor (born 1982)

- Kapoor in 2026
- Born: Ranbir Raj Kapoor; 28 September 1982 (age 44); Bombay, Maharashtra, India
- Occupation: Actor
- Years active: 2007–present
- Works: Full list
- Spouse: Alia Bhatt (m. 2022)
- Children: 1
- Parents: Rishi Kapoor (father); Neetu Singh (mother)
- Family: Kapoor family
- Awards: Full list

Signature
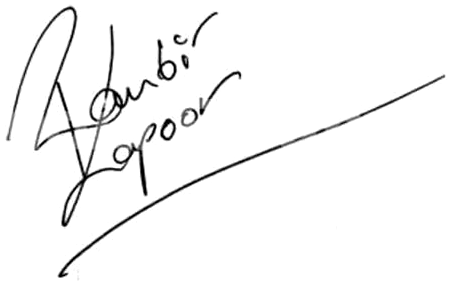

Ranbir Raj Kapoor (pronounced [ɾəɳˈbiːɾ kəˈpuːɾ]; born 28 September 1982) is an Indian actor who works in Hindi-language films. He has received several accolades, including seven Filmfare Awards, and is known for his work across a range of film genres. Kapoor has featured in Forbes India's Celebrity 100 list and was included in the annual Time 100 list of the most influential people in the world in 2026.

The son of actors Rishi Kapoor and Neetu Singh, and the grandson of actor-director Raj Kapoor, Kapoor pursued filmmaking and method acting at the School of Visual Arts and the Lee Strasberg Theatre and Film Institute, respectively. He subsequently assisted Sanjay Leela Bhansali on the film Black (2005) and made his acting debut with Bhansali's tragic romance Saawariya (2007), a critical and commercial failure. He rose to prominence with the coming-of-age film Wake Up Sid, the romantic comedy Ajab Prem Ki Ghazab Kahani (both 2009), and the political drama Raajneeti (2010).

Kapoor's performances as a troubled musician in Rockstar (2011) and a cheerful deaf-and-mute man in Barfi! (2012) earned him two consecutive Filmfare Awards for Best Actor. The romantic comedy Yeh Jawaani Hai Deewani (2013) further established him as a star. This was followed by a series of commercial failures, with Ae Dil Hai Mushkil (2016) and Sanju (2018) being the exceptions. His portrayal of Sanjay Dutt in the latter won him another Filmfare Award. Following a hiatus, he had further commercial success in the fantasy film Brahmāstra: Part One – Shiva (2022) and the action drama Animal (2023) which had winning him a fourth Best Actor award at Filmfare, and the epic mythological film Ramayana: Part 1 (2026) which emerged as his highest-grossing release.

In addition to his acting career, Kapoor supports charities and causes. He is also a co-owner of the Indian Super League football team Mumbai City FC. He is married to the actress Alia Bhatt, with whom he has a daughter, Raha.

== Early life and background ==
Ranbir Kapoor was born on 28 September 1982 in Bombay to Rishi Kapoor and Neetu Singh, both actors in Hindi cinema. He is the great-grandson of Prithviraj Kapoor and the grandson of actor-director Raj Kapoor. His elder sister, Riddhima Kapoor Sahni (born 1980), is an interior and fashion designer. Kapoor is of Punjabi descent on both sides, born to a Hindu father and a Sikh mother. He grew up in a secular environment. He was educated at the Bombay Scottish School, Mahim. The actor Randhir Kapoor is his paternal uncle, and his daughters, actresses Karisma Kapoor and Kareena Kapoor, are his paternal first cousins.

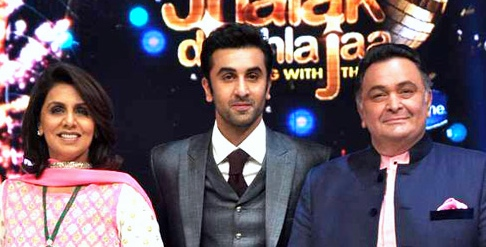
Kapoor with his parents Rishi Kapoor and Neetu Singh Kapoor at the reality show Jhalak Dikhhla Jaa in 2012

Kapoor has been vocal about how his parents' troubled marriage affected him as a child: "Sometimes the fights would get really bad. I would be sitting on the steps, my head between my knees, till five or six in the morning, waiting for them to stop". These experiences led to a "reservoir of emotions building up inside [him]", which he said compelled him to develop an interest in film. In his early years, Kapoor was close to his mother but had a dysfunctional relationship with his father. After completing his tenth standard examinations, he worked as an assistant director to his father on the film Aa Ab Laut Chalen (1999), during which he developed a closer bond with him.

After completing his pre-university education at the H.R. College of Commerce and Economics, Kapoor relocated to New York City to learn filmmaking at the School of Visual Arts and subsequently pursued method acting at the Lee Strasberg Theatre and Film Institute. In film school, Kapoor directed and starred in two short films, entitled Passion to Love and India 1964. The loneliness of living alone in New York City coupled with his experience in film school, which he described as "useless", inspired him to pursue a career in Hindi cinema. Upon returning to Mumbai, Kapoor was hired as an assistant director to Sanjay Leela Bhansali on the 2005 film Black. He described the experience: "I was getting beaten up, abused, doing everything from cleaning the floor to fixing the lights from 7 a.m. to 4 a.m., but I was learning every day." He later remarked that his motive for working on Black was to get Bhansali to offer him an acting job.

== Career ==
=== Early work and success (2007–2010) ===
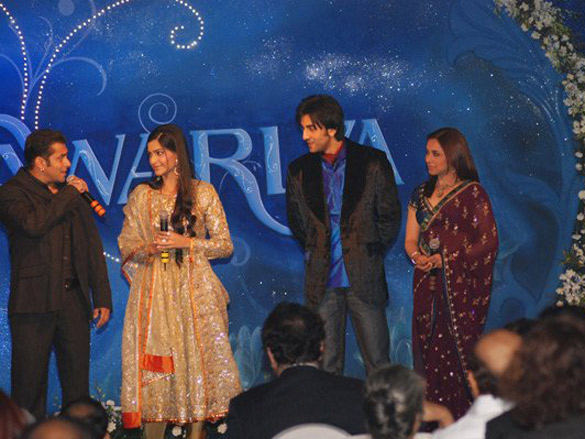
Kapoor (2nd from right) at an event for his debut film Saawariya in 2007

Following the release of Black, Bhansali cast Kapoor as the protagonist of his 2007 tragic romance Saawariya, alongside Sonam Kapoor and Rani Mukerji. The film tells the story of a tramp, played by him, who falls obsessively in love with a woman awaiting the return of her lover. In an interview with the news and entertainment portal Rediff.com, Kapoor stated that his character was written as a tribute to his grandfather's iconic roles as a tramp. Saawariya was the first Indian film to be produced by a Hollywood studio (Sony Pictures Entertainment), and was a highly anticipated release. However, film critics were disappointed with the picture with BBC's Jaspreet Pandohar calling it a "misfire on a massive scale". CNN-IBN's Rajeev Masand considered it "contrived and fake", but was impressed by Kapoor's "affable charm" and wrote that "he's got that star quality to him which is so rare to find." At the box office, Saawariya failed to earn profits. However, at the annual Filmfare Awards ceremony, Kapoor was awarded a Best Male Debut trophy.

Despite the commercial failure of Saawariya, Kapoor was contracted by Yash Raj Films for a primary role in the Siddharth Anand-directed romantic comedy Bachna Ae Haseeno (2008). The film was his first commercial success, in which his role was that of a womaniser who is romantically involved with three women, played by Bipasha Basu, Minissha Lamba, and Deepika Padukone, at different stages of his life. Rachel Saltz of The New York Times expressed mixed views on his performance, but predicted that his "puppy-dog sweetness" would "serve him well as a Bollywood leading man".

In 2009, Kapoor had three film releases. In Dharma Productions's Wake Up Sid, a coming of age film from director Ayan Mukerji, Kapoor portrayed Siddharth "Sid" Mehra, a rich, lazy teenager whose life undergoes a series of changes after interacting with an ambitious journalist (played by Konkana Sen Sharma). When Mukerji narrated the then-untitled script of the film to him, Kapoor came up with the title himself. The media expressed doubt on the film's financial prospect as it depicted a romantic relationship between a younger man and an older woman. It eventually emerged as a sleeper hit and garnered acclaim from the critics. Taran Adarsh of Bollywood Hungama reviewed that Kapoor's performance in the film proved that he was "amongst the best in the business today".

Kapoor next starred opposite Katrina Kaif in Ajab Prem Ki Ghazab Kahani, a slapstick comedy from director Rajkumar Santoshi, that emerged as the fourth highest-grossing Bollywood film of 2009. Film critic Gaurav Malani praised Kapoor's flair for comedy, but criticised his "over-excited husky baritone". His final release that year was the Shimit Amin-directed Rocket Singh: Salesman of the Year, a drama about a sardar who aspires to be a salesman. Film critic Mayank Shekhar praised the film and found Kapoor's performance to be "astonishingly sincere", but the film earned little at the box office. Kapoor later professed to being highly disappointed by the film's commercial failure. At the 55th Filmfare Awards, he was awarded the Filmfare Critics Award for Best Actor for his performances in all three of his 2009 releases, and he also received two Best Actor nominations at the ceremony for Wake Up Sid and Ajab Prem Ki Ghazab Kahani.

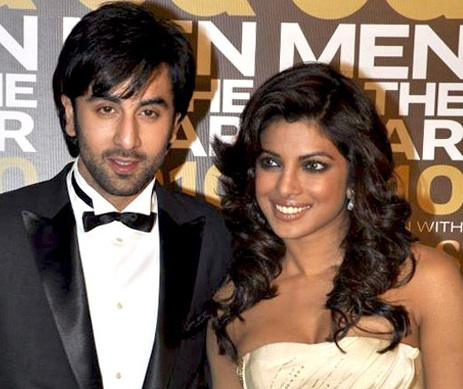
Kapoor with his Anjaana Anjaani co-star Priyanka Chopra in 2010

Prakash Jha's big-budget ensemble political drama Raajneeti was Kapoor's first release of 2010. The film, which starred Nana Patekar, Ajay Devgn, Arjun Rampal, Manoj Bajpayee, Katrina Kaif and Sarah Thompson in prominent roles, was inspired by the Indian epic Mahabharata and Mario Puzo's 1969 novel The Godfather. Kapoor's role was of Samar Pratap (based on the characters of Arjuna and Michael Corleone), the younger heir of an Indian political dynasty, who is reluctantly drawn to politics after the assassination of his father. Kapoor described it as his first complex role and considered it a departure from the "lover boy roles" that he had previously played. Nikhat Kazmi of The Times of India reviewed: "The film finally belongs to Ranbir Kapoor who perfects the art of minimalism—and literally grows before your eyes—as the simmering volcano that cannot be held back, once it erupts." Robert Abele of the Los Angeles Times, however, was more critical of his performance which he considered "stony rather than calculating—especially jarring compared to the histrionic turns around him". Indian trade journalists were apprehensive of the film recovering its ₹600 million (US$6.4 million) investment. The film, however, proved to be a major commercial success with worldwide earnings of over ₹1.43 billion (US$15 million). Kapoor received a third Best Actor nomination at Filmfare for the film.

Later that same year, Kapoor collaborated with Priyanka Chopra on Anand's Anjaana Anjaani, a comedy-drama involving two strangers who decide to commit suicide on New Year's Eve. The film was a moderate financial success but garnered little praise from the critics. Rajeev Masand noted that Kapoor "struggles with a badly-defined role" and NDTV's Anupama Chopra concluded: "Ranbir tries hard to salvage the film, dropping his shirt several times but even his lovingly shot chest can't save the film."

=== Rise to prominence (2011–2013) ===
Following an item number in the children's film Chillar Party (2011), Kapoor took on the role of Janardhan "Jordan" Jakhar in Imtiaz Ali's Rockstar (2011), a drama that follows the journey of an aspiring musician from a humble background to international stardom. In preparation for the role, Kapoor lived with a Jat family in Pitam Pura and studied their mannerisms. He additionally learned to play the guitar and practised extensively at composer A.R. Rahman's music studio. As part of the film's promotional activity, Kapoor performed at a live concert in Mumbai. Film critics were polarised on their view of the film, but were unanimous in their praise for Kapoor; Aniruddha Guha of Daily News and Analysis was particularly impressed with the film and thought that Kapoor's portrayal was one of "Hindi cinema's most accomplished performances by a lead actor". For the role, he won both the Best Actor and Best Actor (Critics) trophies at the 57th Filmfare Awards ceremony, along with Best Actor awards at Screen and IIFA. With a gross revenue of ₹1.07 billion (US$11 million), Rockstar was one of the top-grossing Hindi films of the year.

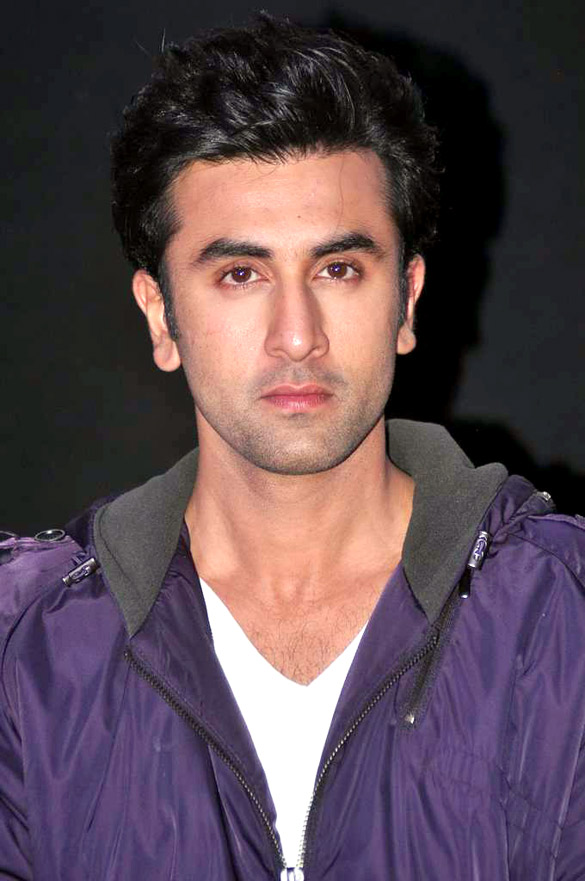
Kapoor at a promotional event for Barfi! in 2012

The 2012 romantic comedy Barfi! was Kapoor's first release to earn over ₹1 billion (US$11 million) at the domestic box office. Directed by Anurag Basu, the film, set in the 1970s, tells the story of its titular protagonist–a deaf and mute man, played by Kapoor–who falls in love with a woman who is already engaged, played by Ileana D'Cruz, and later, an autistic girl, played by Priyanka Chopra. In preparation, he observed the work of actors Roberto Benigni, Charlie Chaplin, and his grandfather. Barfi! received praise from the critics, and the performances of the three lead actors were acclaimed. Ronnie Scheib of Variety praised him for successfully channeling Chaplin in "tone and affect", and Raja Sen of Rediff.com wrote that "he does very strongly indeed with this Chaplin-tribute role, bestowing his character with heart every step of the way". The film was submitted as India's official entry for the 85th Academy Awards, and was screened at the Marrakech and Busan International Film Festivals. Kapoor won second consecutive Best Actor awards at the Filmfare, Screen, and IIFA Award ceremonies.

He achieved further success in 2013 when he reunited with director Ayan Mukerji for the romantic comedy Yeh Jawaani Hai Deewani co-starring Deepika Padukone, Kalki Koechlin, and Aditya Roy Kapoor. He was cast as Kabir "Bunny" Thapar, a commitment-phobic photographer, a character Kapoor found to be an extension of himself. His pairing with Padukone, after their highly publicised break-up, led to hype surrounding the film's release. The film emerged as one of the highest-grossing Indian films to that point, with earnings of ₹2.95 billion (US$32 million), proving to be his third consecutive commercial success in three years and earned him another Best Actor nomination at Filmfare. Film critics found the film to be "riddled with clichés", but praised both Kapoor and Padukone, with Daily News and Analysis' Tushar Joshi labelling their on-screen chemistry as "unsurpassable". His second release of 2013 was the action-comedy film Besharam in which he played a petty thief, alongside Pallavi Sharda and his parents. The film met with an overwhelming negative reception and emerged as a failure; Sudhish Kamath of The Hindu described it as "Kapoor's hall of shame".

=== Commercial struggles and Sanju (2014–2018) ===
After a year-long absence from the screen, Kapoor featured as a mysterious thief in Roy (2015), a romantic thriller which critic Sarita Tanwar described as a "boring, exhausting and pretentious" film. The series of financial failures continued with his next release, the Anurag Kashyap-directed crime drama Bombay Velvet, based on the historian Gyan Prakash's book Mumbai Fables, which also starred Anushka Sharma and Karan Johar. Kapoor portrayed an ambitious boxer in the 1960s who is drawn towards a life of crime; he based his tapori diction on Johnny Walker's character in Mr. & Mrs. '55 (1955). Made on a budget of ₹1.2 billion (US$13 million), the film opened to meagre box-office collections and mixed reviews from critics. Ritika Bhatia of Business Standard found Kapoor's part to be a departure from his previous roles, writing that he "does test the waters with methodical sincerity but his portrayal lacks depth on occasion". Bombay Velvet was eventually screened at the Locarno and Bucheon film festivals.

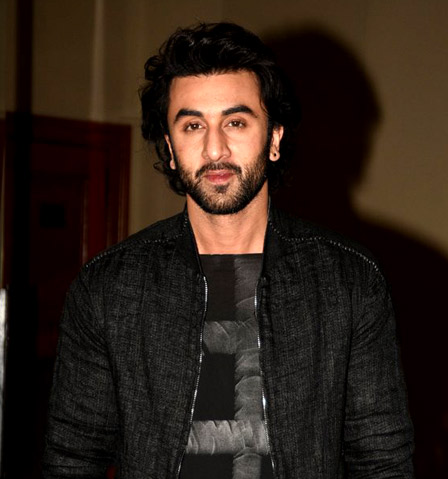
Kapoor at an event for Jagga Jasoos in 2017

Kapoor next reunited with Deepika Padukone in Tamasha (2015), a romantic drama from Imtiaz Ali. He played the role of Ved Sahni, a man who desires a career in the arts but settles for a life of monotony as an engineer. Once again, the film failed commercially and received mixed reviews from critics. Kapoor's performance was praised; Lisa Tsering of The Hollywood Reporter wrote, "Kapoor is beautifully cast, his trademark mix of assertive theatricality and subtle emotion well suited to the role of a man who seemingly has it all under control, until he doesn't." Kapoor's career prospect briefly improved in 2016 when he took on the lead role of an aspiring musician in Karan Johar's Ae Dil Hai Mushkil (2016). The romantic drama, co-starring Anushka Sharma and Aishwarya Rai, tells the story of unrequited love, and proved to be one of the highest-grossing Bollywood films of the year. Critical reception was mixed; Joe Leydon of Variety thought that "Kapoor [is] often erring on the side of annoying while trying to balance vulnerability and self-centeredness". Both Tamasha and Ae Dil Hai Mushkil earned Kapoor Best Actor nominations at Filmfare.

In a collaboration with director Anurag Basu, Kapoor formed a production company named Picture Shuru Productions, whose first release was the musical comedy-mystery film Jagga Jasoos (2017), which tells the story of a gifted teenager's search for his missing stepfather. Production on the project was plagued with difficulties—principal photography began in 2014, but the release date was pushed back several times owing to changes in the script, multiple reshoots, and rumours of animosity between Kapoor and co-star Katrina Kaif (the couple had broken-up before they finished filming). Anna M. M. Vetticad of Firstpost considered the film to be "a laudable experiment that zigzags off course", and while praising Kapoor's dedication to his part, criticised the decision to cast him as a teenage schoolboy. It did not perform well commercially which led Kapoor to regret his venture into production.

In 2018, Kapoor portrayed the actor Sanjay Dutt in Rajkumar Hirani's biopic Sanju. It deals with Dutt's troubled relationship with his father, his drug addiction, and his arrest for illegal possession of firearms. Kapoor was keen to avoid a hagiographic narrative and did not want to mimic Dutt's mannerisms. He interacted extensively with Dutt and took a month's time to transform himself physically before filming each phase of the actor's life. Saibal Chatterjee of NDTV thought that despite dramatic liberties, the film had successfully portrayed Dutt's complexity, and wrote that Kapoor "pulls out the stops in astonishingly effective ways, subsuming his personality into that of the protagonist". Uday Bhatia of Mint was more critical for making Dutt too sympathetic despite his misdeeds, and wrote that Kapoor's "imitation (astonishing at times) takes over the performance". Sanju's strong financial performance re-established Kapoor's stardom. With earnings of over ₹5.79 billion (US$62 million), it emerged as Kapoor's biggest commercial success to that point. He won another Best Actor award at Filmfare.

=== Career hiatus and established actor (2019–present) ===
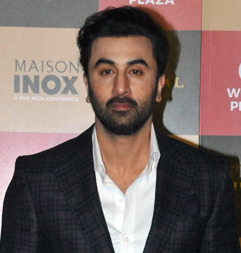
Kapoor at an event for Animal (2023).

Following Sanju, Kapoor's next screen appearance was after four years in 2022, when he starred in Shamshera and Brahmāstra: Part One – Shiva. He attributed this absence to the COVID-19 pandemic, the death of his father, and the lengthy production time of these two big-budgeted films. In Shamshera, a period action film set in the 1800s, he played a dual role. The film received poor reviews, with Saibal Chatterjee writing that "the actor should henceforth read his scripts with a more critical eye before buying into them. He owes it to his talent". It emerged as another box office bomb for Kapoor. He then starred opposite Alia Bhatt in Ayan Mukerji's fantasy film Brahmāstra: Part One – Shiva, the first part in a planned trilogy, which took five years to film. Made on a production and marketing budget of around ₹4 billion (US$43 million), the film is one of the most expensive Indian films. His performance and chemistry with Bhatt was not well-received by Simon Abrams of TheWrap, but Deccan Herald's Vivek M. V. deemed him "excellent as [a] vulnerable orphan". It earned ₹4.31 billion (US$46 million) to rank as the highest-grossing Hindi film of 2022.

Kapoor starred alongside Shraddha Kapoor in Luv Ranjan's Tu Jhoothi Main Makkaar (2023), which Tushar Joshi of India Today remarked was a welcome return for Kapoor into the romantic comedy genre. It emerged as a moderate commercial success. Keen to break away from his on-screen image, Kapoor accepted the role of a violent man with a troubled relationship with his father in Sandeep Reddy Vanga's action drama Animal. He described the part as "way out of my comfort zone", and was challenged by the prospect of playing a "blend of strength, vulnerability and unpredictability". The film's content led certain commentators to accuse the film and his character of glorifying toxic masculinity and misogyny. The Guardian described Kapoor's role as "one of the vilest in cinema history", but a reviewer for News18 added that he "breathes life into this undesirable character with a lot of charisma and swag". He won his fourth Best Actor award at Filmfare.

In 2026, Kapoor portrayed Rama in Nitesh Tiwari's directorial, Ramayana: Part 1, which is a two-part adaptation of the epic, Ramayana. It emerged as Kapoor's highest-grossing release and one of Hindi cinema's biggest earners. Reviewing the film, Anuj Kumar of The Hindu opined Kapoor portrays Ram with "immense grace, quiet authority and emotional restraint", though he felt his Ram was overshadowed onscreen by Yash's Ravana. He will reteam with Bhansali in the romantic drama, Love & War, co-starring his wife, Alia Bhatt and Vicky Kaushal.

== Personal life ==
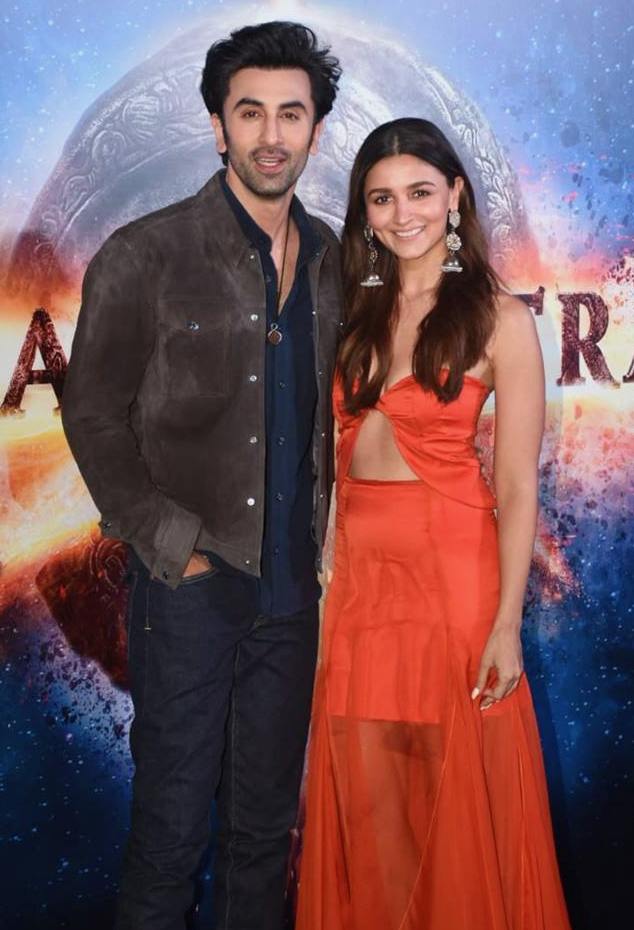
Kapoor and his wife Alia Bhatt, pictured in 2021

Kapoor has been vocal about his personal life and has stated that his parents' marriage taught him how complex a relationship can be. He had his first serious relationship while in the seventh grade, and suffered from depression when it ended. While filming Bachna Ae Haseeno in 2008, Kapoor began dating his co-star Deepika Padukone. The relationship attracted substantial media coverage in India and they speculated on an impending engagement. However, the couple broke up a year later. Kapoor maintained that the split was amicable, though the media widely reported that the split was due to infidelity on Kapoor's part. Kapoor later confessed: "Yes, I have, out of immaturity, out of inexperience, out of taking advantage of certain temptations, out of callousness." Later in 2015, Kapoor stated that they both had resolved the conflict and had moved on with their lives. Since the split, he has been reticent to publicly discuss his personal life.

Rumours of an affair with Katrina Kaif first emerged during the production of Ajab Prem Ki Ghazab Kahani in 2009. In August 2013, a set of paparazzi photographs of Kapoor and Kaif at a beach in Spain were published by Stardust. Although Kapoor initially declined to speak of the relationship, he admitted to it in 2015: "Both of us are sure about our relationship and if we don't open about it now, it would be showing disrespect to the relationship." In February 2016, the media reported that they had broken up. He has also spoken about being addicted to smoking and drinking.

In 2018, he began dating Alia Bhatt, his co-star in Brahmastra (2022). He married her on 14 April 2022 in a private ceremony in their Mumbai house. On 6 November 2022, Bhatt gave birth to their daughter, Raha.

== Off-screen work ==
In addition to acting, Kapoor is a football enthusiast and supports charities and organisations. He is the vice-captain of the All Stars Football Club, a celebrity football club that raises money for charity. In March 2013, he played the game to raise funds for the Magic Funds Organisation, an NGO for underprivileged children. Along with the chartered accountant Bimal Parekh, Kapoor acquired ownership rights in 2014 for the Mumbai-based football team of the Indian Super League, named Mumbai City FC. Also that year, Kapoor announced his participation with the digital music company Saavn as a content and programming adviser. In 2016, he featured in the documentary series Girls with Goals, to create awareness about and raise funds for YUWA, an all-girls football team in the state of Jharkhand. In 2024, he launched a lifestyle brand named ARKS.

Kapoor supports the empowerment of the girl child and is the goodwill ambassador of Shabana Azmi's Mijwan Welfare Society, an NGO which helps empower women. He supports environmental charities, and in 2011 donated money to the Community Water Initiative, a charitable organisation owned by PepsiCo. In 2012, he appeared alongside other celebrities in a short film by Zoya Akhtar to generate awareness on breast cancer. He is the campaign ambassador for NDTV's Marks for Sports, a nationwide initiative to promote fitness and health in India. In 2013, he participated in an auction on eBay, where the highest bidder gets an opportunity to interact with him; the proceeds were donated to Save the Children, a non-profit organisation that raised funds for flood affected households in Uttarakhand. That same year, he appeared alongside other celebrities in a commercial, produced by the National Film Development Corporation of India, to create awareness about children's education. In December 2014, he again took part in another eBay auction; the phiran he wore in Rockstar (2011) was sold, with proceeds going to the redevelopment of the flood-ravaged states of Kashmir and Assam. He had also fronted a campaign to collect donations for the victims of the April 2015 Nepal earthquake. In 2015, he presented 2,000 raincoats to the Mumbai Traffic Police as an appreciation for their service during the year's heavy monsoon. In 2018, he collaborated with Aamir Khan's Paani Foundation to help local farmers and villagers suffering from drought in parts of Maharashtra.

== In the media ==
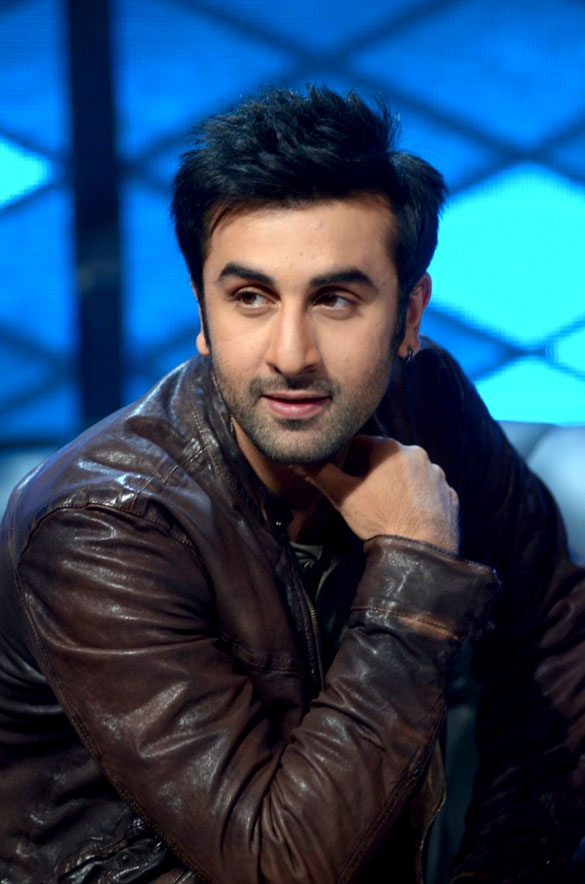
Kapoor in 2012

Born into a family of popular actors, Kapoor faced the media spotlight from a young age; Hindustan Times published that "he was always a star kid from whom everyone had great expectations". Despite the failure of his first film (Saawariya), IANS reported that he "rose like [a] meteor on film firmament by giving compelling performances in films like Raajneeti, Rockstar and [..] Barfi!" Discussing the commercial viability of Kapoor, Apoorva Mehta, the COO of Dharma Productions, noted in 2013, "In a short career span of 10 films, Ranbir Kapoor has achieved a tremendous jump in the business done by his films." Also that year, The Economic Times credited him as "the most bankable actor of his generation". However, following the success of Yeh Jawaani Hai Deewani, each of Kapoor's releases under-performed at the box-office. This led trade journalists to criticise his choice of films, noting that his inclination towards experimental projects negatively impacted his commercial appeal.

Nationally, he is one of the most popular and high-profile celebrities. In 2012 and 2013, Forbes featured him among the top twenty in India's Celebrity 100, a list based on the income and popularity of the country's celebrities. For the next two years, he was ranked 11th with an estimated annual earning of ₹93.25 crore (US$10 million) and ₹85 crore (US$9.1 million) respectively, making him one of the highest-paid actors in the country. He was frequently featured in Rediff.com's annual listing of "Bollywood's Best Actors"; he was ranked second in 2009, first in 2011, third in 2012, and held the sixth position in 2015. Madame Tussauds museum installed four wax sculptures of him at four locations, including Dubai, Singapore, Bangkok, and Delhi.

He has been cited as one of the most attractive Indian celebrities by the media. He has featured on The Times of India's listing of the 'Most Desirable Man' from 2010 to 2015, ranking among the top ten each year. In 2009 People magazine listed him as the "Sexiest Man Alive" in India, and in 2013 he topped Filmfare's poll of the "Most Stylish Young Actor". Also in 2013, he was one of the recipients of the "People of the Year" award by the Limca Book of Records. In 2010, he was voted the "Sexiest Asian Man" in a poll conducted by the magazine Eastern Eye. Kapoor continued to feature among the top ten of the list from 2011 to 2014. He is also the celebrity endorser for various brands, including Pepsi, Panasonic, Renault, Lenovo and the Spanish football club FC Barcelona.

== Awards and nominations ==
Kapoor has been the recipient of seven Filmfare Awards: Best Male Debut for Saawariya (2007), Critics Award for Best Actor for Wake Up Sid (2009), Ajab Prem Ki Ghazab Kahani (2009), and Rocket Singh: Salesman of the Year (2009) (jointly for the three films), and Rockstar (2011), and Best Actor awards for Rockstar, Barfi! (2012), Sanju (2018), and Animal (2023).
