= Preity Zinta filmography =

Indian actress filmography

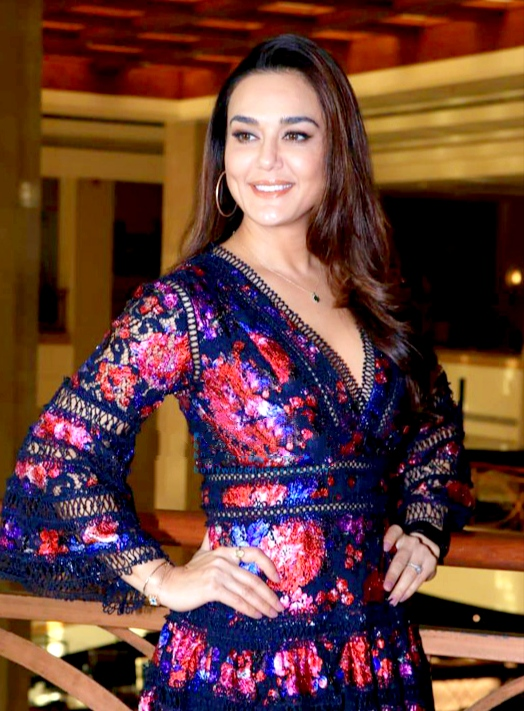
Zinta at a promotional event for Bhaiaji Superhit (2018)

Preity Zinta is an Indian actress known for her work in Hindi films. She made her debut in 1998 with a supporting role in the drama Dil Se... Later that year, she starred in the commercially successful thriller Soldier. For the films, she won a Filmfare Award in the Best Female Debut category. In 1999, Zinta played the role of a CBI officer in the psychological thriller Sangharsh. She followed this with the role of a teenage single mother in the Kundan Shah-directed drama Kya Kehna (2000), a sleeper hit. That same year, she starred in the romance Har Dil Jo Pyar Karega, and the crime drama Mission Kashmir, the third highest grossing Bollywood film of the year.

In 2001, Zinta featured in the dramedy Dil Chahta Hai, which is cited in the media as a defining film of Hindi cinema. Later that year, she portrayed a prostitute-turned-surrogate in the romantic drama Chori Chori Chupke Chupke. Her only screen appearance of 2002 was in the box-office flop Dil Hai Tumhaara. Zinta featured in four films in 2003. Her first role of the year was opposite Sunny Deol in Anil Sharma's drama The Hero—the most expensive Bollywood film to that point. She played a negative role in the romantic drama Armaan, which saw her portray a rich, schizophrenic woman. Following this, she starred in two blockbusters—the science fiction film Koi... Mil Gaya and the drama Kal Ho Naa Ho. For the latter, she won the Filmfare Award for Best Actress.

Zinta played a journalist in the 2004 war drama Lakshya, which performed poorly at the box-office. Also in 2004, she played the titular female role in Yash Chopra's star-crossed romance Veer-Zaara opposite Shah Rukh Khan. The film emerged as the year's highest grossing Bollywood film. She then appeared in the 2005 romantic comedy Salaam Namaste and the 2006 romantic drama Kabhi Alvida Naa Kehna, both of which performed well outside India. While she played a radio jockey in Salaam Namaste, Zinta was seen as an unhappily married woman in the latter. She followed it with roles in the commercial failures Jaan-E-Mann (2006) and Jhoom Barabar Jhoom (2007). Zinta appeared in the Canadian film Heaven on Earth (2008), her first international production.

In 2011, Zinta hosted the reality show Guinness World Records – Ab India Todega and the chat show Up Close & Personal with PZ. That same year, she also launched her production company, PZNZ Media, under which she produced and starred in the 2013 romantic comedy Ishkq in Paris, which performed poorly at the box-office.

== Films ==
Year	Title	Role	Director(s)	Notes	Ref(s)
1998	Dil Se..	Preeti Nair	Mani Ratnam		
1998	Premante Idera	Shailu	Jayanth C. Paranjee	Telugu film	
1998	Soldier	Preity	Abbas–Mustan		
1999	Rajakumarudu	Rani	K. Raghavendra Rao	Telugu film	
1999	Sangharsh	Reet Oberoi	Tanuja Chandra		
1999	Dillagi	Rani	Sunny Deol	Guest appearance	
2000	Kya Kehna	Priya Bakshi	Kundan Shah		
2000	Har Dil Jo Pyar Karega	Jahnvi	Raj Kanwar		
2000	Mission Kashmir	Sufiya Parvez/Sufiya Altaf Khan	Vidhu Vinod Chopra		
2001	Farz	Kajal Singh	Raj Kanwar		
2001	Chori Chori Chupke Chupke	Madhubala	Abbas–Mustan		
2001	Dil Chahta Hai	Shalini	Farhan Akhtar		
2001	Yeh Raaste Hain Pyaar Ke	Sakshi	Deepak Shivdasani		
2002	Dil Hai Tumhaara	Shalu	Kundan Shah		
2003	The Hero: Love Story of a Spy	Reshma (Ruksar)	Anil Sharma		
2003	Armaan	Sonia Kapoor	Honey Irani		
2003	Koi... Mil Gaya	Nisha Malhotra	Rakesh Roshan		
2003	Kal Ho Naa Ho	Naina Catherine Kapur	Nikhil Advani		
2004	Lakshya	Romila Dutta	Farhan Akhtar		
2004	Dil Ne Jise Apna Kahaa	Dr. Parineeta	Atul Agnihotri		
2004	Veer-Zaara	Zaara Hayaat Khan	Yash Chopra		
2005	Khullam Khulla Pyaar Karen	Priti Damani	Harmesh Malhotra		
2005	Salaam Namaste	Ambar 'Amby' Malhotra	Siddharth Anand		
2006	Alag	—	Jim Mulligan; Ashu Trikha	Special appearance in song "Sabse Alag"	
2006	Krrish	Nisha Malhotra	Rakesh Roshan	Mentioned	
2006	Kabhi Alvida Naa Kehna	Rhea Saran	Karan Johar		
2006	Jaan-E-Mann	Piya Goyal	Shrish Kunder		
2007	Jhoom Barabar Jhoom	Alvira Khan	Shaad Ali		
2007	Om Shanti Om	Herself	Farah Khan	Special appearance in song "Deewangi Deewangi"	
2008	Heaven on Earth	Chand Kaur Dhillon	Deepa Mehta	Canadian film	
2008	The Last Lear	Shabnam	Rituparno Ghosh	English language film	
2008	Heroes	Kuljeet Kaur	Samir Karnik		
2008	Rab Ne Bana Di Jodi	—	Aditya Chopra	Special appearance in song "Phir Milenge Chalte Chalte"	
2009	Main Aurr Mrs Khanna	Haseena Jagmagia	Prem Soni	Special appearance	
2013	Ishkq in Paris	Ishkq	Prem Raj	Also producer and writer	
2014	Happy Ending	Divya Chhillar	Raj & DK	Cameo appearance	
2018	Welcome to New York	Herself	Chakri Toleti	Cameo appearance	
2018	Bhaiaji Superhit	Sapna Dubey	Neeraj Pathak		
2026	Batwara 1947	Hamida Mirza	Rajkumar Santoshi		
2026	Vibe	Madam H	Kunal Khemu		

== Television ==
Year	Title	Role	Notes	Ref(s)
2011	Guinness World Records – Ab India Todega	Host		
2011	Up Close & Personal with PZ	Host		
2015	Nach Baliye	Judge	Season 7	
2020	Fresh Off the Boat	Meena	Episode "The Magic Motor Inn"	
2023	The Night Manager	—N/a	Executive producer	

== See also ==
- List of awards and nominations received by Preity Zinta
