= List of awards and nominations received by Preity Zinta =

Preity Zinta awards and nominations
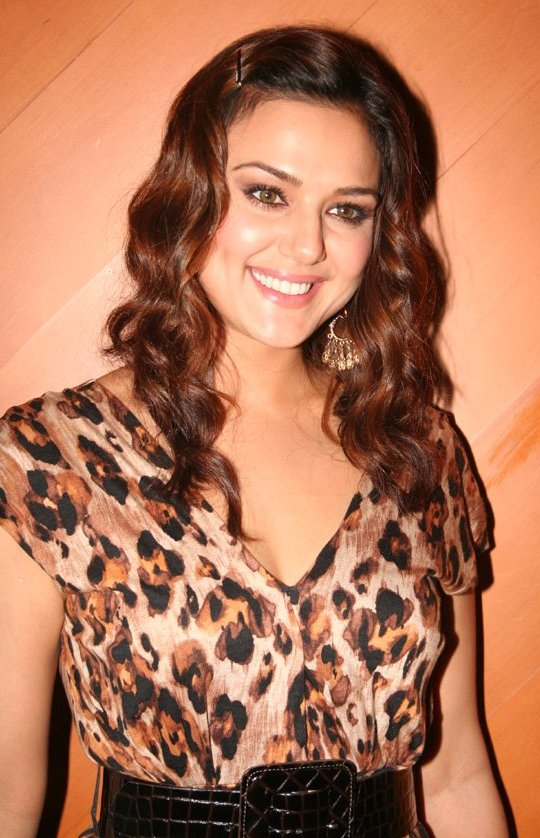
- Zinta in 2006
Awards and nominations
Award	Wins	Nominations
Smita Patil Memorial Award	1	-
Filmfare Awards	2	10
Bollywood Movie Awards	1	6
Screen Awards	2	9
Zee Cine Awards	3	8
Vancouver Film Critics Circle Awards	0	1
Stardust Awards	3	5
Star Guild Awards	0	2
IIFA Awards	3	8
Chicago International Film Festival	1	1
Sansui Viewers' Choice Movie Awards	2	3
Global Indian Film Awards	0	1

Totals (Note: Certain award groups do not simply award one winner. They acknowledge several different recipients, have runners-up, and have third place. Since this is a specific recognition and is different from losing an award, runner-up mentions are considered wins in this award tally. For simplification and to avoid errors, each award in this list has been presumed to have had a prior nomination.)
- Wins: 30
- Nominations: 56

Preity Zinta is an Indian actress, who has received several awards for her acting in Hindi films. Her career began in 1998 with Mani Ratnam's acclaimed drama Dil Se.. and the box office hit Soldier. Both films won her the award for Best Female Debut at the 44th Filmfare Awards. Her performance in Dil Se.. also earned her a Best Supporting Actress nomination at the same ceremony, while Soldier won her three more Best Debut awards at other major ceremonies. Zinta received her first Filmfare nomination for Best Actress for her portrayal of a teenage single mother in Kya Kehna. She followed these films with several critically and commercially successful films, such as Mission Kashmir (2000) and Dil Chahta Hai (2001), and her performances in Chori Chori Chupke Chupke (2001), Dil Hai Tumhaara (2002) and Armaan (2003) were praised.

Zinta won several awards for her performance in the romantic comedy-drama Kal Ho Naa Ho, including her first and only Filmfare Award for Best Actress. She went on to star in top-grossing productions in India and abroad, including Koi... Mil Gaya (2003), Veer-Zaara (2004), Salaam Namaste (2005) and Kabhi Alvida Naa Kehna (2006), all of which earned her different nominations at major award ceremonies, which, in addition to Filmfare, include such organisations as Screen, Zee Cine, the International Indian Film Academy (IIFA), and Stardust, among others. After a relatively low phase, she started appearing in arthouse films, known in India as parallel cinema. She played her first international film role in Deepa Mehta's Canadian drama Heaven on Earth (2008, titled Videsh in India). Her portrayal in the film won her the Silver Hugo Award for Best Actress at the Chicago International Film Festival, and she was a Best Actress nominee at several award functions in Canada, including the Genie Awards by the Academy of Canadian Cinema & Television, and the Vancouver Film Critics Circle.

Apart from merit awards for her film performances, Zinta was awarded different non-acting honours at major film award functions. These include IIFA's Style Diva of the Year and Glamorous Star awards. She was named Zee Cine's Queen of Hearts in 2003 and female Superstar of the Year in 2004. In 2009, Zinta was one of five actresses nominated as "Star of the Decade – Female" at the 10th IIFA Awards. In addition to industry honours, Zinta has received several achievement awards for both her film career and her social activities. In 2003, Zinta became the first recipient of Godfrey's Mind of Steel Award at the annual Red and White Bravery Awards, given to her for the "Courageous Act" of standing against the Mumbai underworld after she became the only witness not to retract in court her earlier statements against the Indian mafia during the 2003 Bharat Shah case. In 2010, the University of East London awarded Zinta with an Honorary Doctorate of Arts in honour of both her cultural contribution and her humanitarian work.

== Awards and nominations ==
Awards and nominations received by Preity Zinta
Award	Year	Category	Nominated work	Result	Ref(s)
Anandalok Puraskar Awards	2004	Best Actress (Hindi)	Kal Ho Naa Ho	Won	
Bollywood Movie Awards	1999	Best Female Debut	Soldier	Won	
Bollywood Movie Awards	2001	Most Sensational Actress	Kya Kehna	Nominated	
Bollywood Movie Awards	2003	Best Actress (Critics)	Dil Hai Tumhaara	Nominated	
Bollywood Movie Awards	2003	Best Actress	Dil Hai Tumhaara	Nominated	
Bollywood Movie Awards	2006	Best Actress	Salaam Namaste	Nominated	
Bollywood Movie Awards	2007	Best Supporting Actress	Kabhi Alvida Naa Kehna	Nominated	
Chicago International Film Festival	2008	Best Actress	Heaven on Earth	Won	
FICCI Hall of FRAMES Awards	2004	Best Actress	Kal Ho Naa Ho	Won	
Filmfare Awards	1999	Best Female Debut	Dil Se.. and Soldier	Won	
Filmfare Awards	1999	Best Supporting Actress	Dil Se..	Nominated	
Filmfare Awards	2001	Best Actress	Kya Kehna	Nominated	
Filmfare Awards	2002	Best Supporting Actress	Chori Chori Chupke Chupke	Nominated	
Filmfare Awards	2004	Best Actress	Kal Ho Naa Ho	Won	
Filmfare Awards	2004	Best Actress	Koi... Mil Gaya	Nominated	
Filmfare Awards	2004	Best Villain	Armaan	Nominated	
Filmfare Awards	2005	Best Actress	Veer-Zaara	Nominated	
Filmfare Awards	2006	Best Actress	Salaam Namaste	Nominated	
Filmfare Awards	2007	Best Supporting Actress	Kabhi Alvida Naa Kehna	Nominated	
Genie Awards	2009	Best Actress	Heaven on Earth	Nominated	
Global Indian Film Awards	2007	Best Supporting Actress	Kabhi Alvida Naa Kehna	Nominated	
Indian Telly Awards	2012	Best Anchor	Guinness World Records – Ab India Todega	Nominated	
International Indian Film Academy Awards	2001	Best Actress	Kya Kehna	Nominated	
International Indian Film Academy Awards	2002	Best Actress	Dil Chahta Hai	Nominated	
International Indian Film Academy Awards	2004	Best Actress	Kal Ho Naa Ho	Won	
International Indian Film Academy Awards	2004	Best Actress	Koi... Mil Gaya	Nominated	
International Indian Film Academy Awards	2005	Style Diva of the Year	—	Won	
International Indian Film Academy Awards	2006	Most Glamorous Star of the Year	—	Won	
International Indian Film Academy Awards	2006	Best Actress	Salaam Namaste	Nominated	
International Indian Film Academy Awards	2009	Star of the Decade – Female	—	Nominated	
Priyadarshini Academy Awards	2008	Smita Patil Memorial Award for Best Actress	—	Won	
Producers Guild Film Awards	2004	Best Actress	Kal Ho Naa Ho	Nominated	
Producers Guild Film Awards	2004	Best Supporting Actress	Armaan	Nominated	
Sansui Viewers' Choice Movie Awards	2001	Best Actress	Kya Kehna	Won	
Sansui Viewers' Choice Movie Awards	2004	Best Actress	Kal Ho Naa Ho	Won	
Sansui Viewers' Choice Movie Awards	2004	Best Villain	Armaan	Nominated	
Screen Awards	1999	Best Female Debut	Soldier	Won	
Screen Awards	2001	Best Actress	Kya Kehna	Nominated	
Screen Awards	2002	Jodi No. 1 (along with Aamir Khan)	Dil Chahta Hai	Nominated	
Screen Awards	2003	Best Actress	Dil Hai Tumhaara	Nominated	
Screen Awards	2004	Best Actress	Kal Ho Naa Ho	Nominated	
Screen Awards	2004	Best Villain	Armaan	Nominated	
Screen Awards	2005	Best Actress	Veer-Zaara	Won	
Screen Awards	2005	Jodi No. 1 (along with Shah Rukh Khan)	Veer-Zaara	Nominated	
Screen Awards	2006	Best Actress	Salaam Namaste	Nominated	
Stardust Awards	2004	Actor of the Year – Female	Kal Ho Naa Ho	Won	
Stardust Awards	2005	Actor of the Year – Female	Veer-Zaara	Won	
Stardust Awards	2007	Best Supporting Actress	Kabhi Alvida Naa Kehna	Nominated	
Stardust Awards	2009	Best Actress	The Last Lear	Nominated	
Stardust Awards	2010	Best Actress	Heaven on Earth	Won	
Vancouver Film Critics Circle Awards	2009	Best Actress in a Canadian Film	Heaven on Earth	Nominated	
Zee Cine Awards	1999	Best Female Debut	Soldier	Won	
Zee Cine Awards	2001	Best Actor – Female	Kya Kehna	Nominated	
Zee Cine Awards	2003	Queen of Hearts	—	Won	
Zee Cine Awards	2004	Star of the Year – Female	—	Won	
Zee Cine Awards	2004	Best Actor – Female	Kal Ho Naa Ho	Nominated	
Zee Cine Awards	2005	Best Actor – Female	Veer-Zaara	Nominated	
Zee Cine Awards	2006	Best Actor – Female	Salaam Namaste	Nominated	
Zee Cine Awards	2007	Best Supporting Actress	Kabhi Alvida Naa Kehna	Nominated	

== Honours and recognitions ==
- 2003: Mind of Steel Award Award at Godfrey Phillips National Bravery Awards, given to her for the "Courageous Act" of standing against the Mumbai underworld
- 2008: GR8! FLO Women Achievers Awards for achievement in films
- 2009: IIFA-FICCI Frames Awards, among 10 "Most Powerful Entertainers of the Decade"
- 2010: Honorary Doctorate of Arts, the University of East London, in honour of her cultural contribution and humanitarian work. Cited as "an international actress, pioneering star of Hindi cinema and devoted humanitarian. Preity has carved a path for women to follow."
- 2011: Venice Film Festival, "World Diamond Group Platinum Award for Peoples' Friendship"
- 2013: YFLO Young Women Achievers Award for achievement in films

== Bibliography ==
- Clini, Clelia (14 November 2018). "Diasporic dreams and shattered desires: Displacement, identity and tradition in heaven on earth (Deepa Mehta, 2008)". In Bayman, Louis; Pinazza, Natália (eds.). Journeys on Screen: Theory, Ethics, Aesthetics. Edinburgh University Press. pp. 50–69. ISBN 978-1-4744-2184-3.
- Dawar, Ramesh (2006). Bollywood: Yesterday, Today, Tomorrow. Star Publications. ISBN 978-1-9058-630-13.
