= IIFA Award for Most Glamorous Star of the Year =

Film award in India

The IIFA Most Glamorous Star of the Year Award was a special award given to those who are found to be the most glamorous stars of that year.

The winners are listed below:

Year	Winner
2006	Preity Zinta
2007	Aishwarya Rai and Hrithik Roshan

== See also ==
- IIFA Awards
- Bollywood
- Cinema of India
