= IIFA Award for Style Diva of the Year =

Film award in India

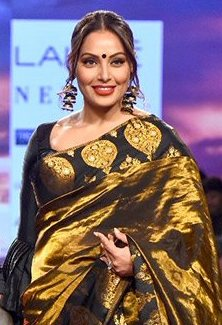
- The 2009 recipient: Bipasha Basu
- Country: India
- Presented by: IIFA
- First award: Rekha (2003)
- Currently held by: Bipasha Basu (2009)

The IIFA Diva Award is chosen by the viewers and was given on behalf of Samsung and then IDEA later on.

== Winners ==
The winners are listed below-

Year	Winner
2003	Rekha
2004	Kareena Kapoor
2005	Preity Zinta
2008	Katrina Kaif
2009	Bipasha Basu

== See also ==
- IIFA Awards
- Bollywood
- Cinema of India
