= Godfrey Phillips National Bravery Awards =

National Bravery Award

Bravery Awards
- Awarded for: Godfrey Phillips Bravery Awards
- Sponsored by: Godfrey Phillips India Ltd.
- First award: 1990

The Godfrey Phillips National Bravery Awards (formerly: Red and White Bravery Awards) is a surrogate tobacco brand promotional activity of Godfrey Phillips India, instituted in 1990, as a PR campaign to promote its cigarette brand "Red and White" by honoring courageous people in Indian society. It is supported by a parallel advertising campaign, "Red & White Piney Walon Ki Baat hi Kuch Aur Hai." The award purports to recognise the ordinary citizens who have selflessly performed extraordinary, little-known acts of physical bravery and social acts of courage, thereby setting an example for others to follow.

Presented annually, these awards are the only ones of their kind instituted by a tobacco company which uses its corporate identity to give awards.

The surrogate activity is under challenge by the public health community and the government as being a violation of Section 5 of the Cigarette and Other Tobacco Products Act 2003. Many recipients like actor Vivek Oberoi and activist Harman Siddu have returned these awards after realising that the award is a surrogate activity of the tobacco industry. It was formerly known as Red and White Bravery Awards but its name was changed in 2003, in response to protests from various quarters about surrogate advertising for the Red and White cigarette brand.

In 2006, film actor Preity Zinta was appointed as the brand ambassador of the awards.

== Jury ==
Tobacco company Godfrey Phillips claims that the award is judged by a panel comprising personalities from fields like administrative services, police and retired judges of the Supreme Court and High Courts, social workers and media celebrities. It also claims that the selection process involves thorough checking of cited events, persons and places, in order to ensure that only deserving individuals are given the awards.

== Bravery categories ==
The awards include three main categories, and one category for lifetime achievement. Until 2003, the awards were presented in two main categories, "Physical Bravery" and "Social Acts of Courage". Winners in each category were awarded gold, silver and bronze medals, which entailed cash prizes of Rs. 20,000, Rs. 15,000, and Rs. 10,000 respectively. In 2003, a major new category, the "Mind of Steel Award", was added to the two main categories; its first recipient was actress Preity Zinta. The "Lifetime Achievement Award for Social Service", was instituted in 1997.

=== Physical Bravery Award ===
This award is for performing a selfless act of bravery at great personal risk to save life, or property of someone else. This honour can be given posthumously as well.

=== Social Bravery Award ===
This award recognizes valiant efforts against social evils like drug abuse, dowry, child labour, corruption, illiteracy, environmental pollution, etc. Individuals, as well as social organizations registered in India, are eligible for this award.

=== Mind of steel Award ===
This award recognizes people who despite having their limitations have performed far beyond the ordinary and pushed the limits of courage and performance to a new level. This award also recognizes people who have stood by their personal convictions in a social situation, without thinking at all about the consequences.

=== Lifetime Achievement Award for Social Service ===
This award is given to outstanding citizens for their remarkable lifetime contribution in the field of social service; those who have selflessly spent their lives working for the betterment of society.
