= Preity Zinta =

Indian actress (born 1975)

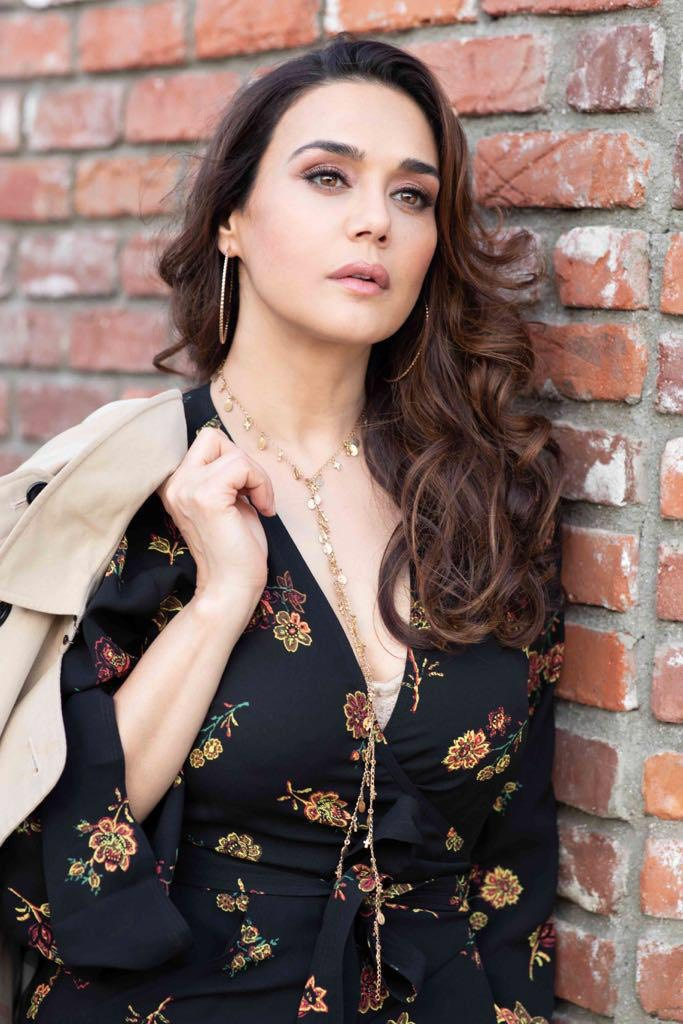
- Zinta in 2018
- Born: Preity Zinta; 31 January 1975 (age 51); Shimla, Himachal Pradesh, India
- Education: St. Bede's College, Shimla
- Occupation: Actress
- Years active: 1998–present
- Works: Full list
- Spouse: Gene Goodenough (m. 2016)
- Children: 2
- Awards: Full list

Preity G. Zinta (pronounced [ˈpɾiːt̪i ˈzɪɳʈɑː]; born 31 January 1975) is an Indian actress and entrepreneur primarily known for her work in Hindi films. After graduating with degrees in English honours and criminal psychology, Zinta made her acting debut in Dil Se in 1998, followed by a role in Soldier in the same year. These performances earned her the Filmfare Award for Best Female Debut, and she was later recognised for her role as a teenage single mother in Kya Kehna (2000). She established a career as a leading Hindi film actress of the decade with a variety of character types. Her roles, often deemed culturally defiant, along with her unconventional screen persona won her recognition and several accolades.

Following critically appreciated roles in Sangharsh (1999), Chori Chori Chupke Chupke (2001), Dil Chahta Hai (2001), Dil Hai Tumhaara (2002), and Armaan (2003), Zinta received the Filmfare Award for Best Actress for her performance in Kal Ho Naa Ho (2003). She starred in two consecutive annual top-grossing films in India, Koi... Mil Gaya (2003) and Veer-Zaara (2004), and was noted for her portrayal of independent, modern Indian women in Salaam Namaste (2005) and Kabhi Alvida Naa Kehna (2006), top-grossing productions in domestic and overseas markets. For her first international role in the Canadian drama Heaven on Earth (2008) she was awarded the Silver Hugo Award for Best Actress and nominated for the Genie Award. She followed this with a hiatus from acting work for several years, with intermittent appearances such as in her self-produced comeback film, Ishkq in Paris (2013), which failed to leave a mark.

Zinta is also a social activist, television presenter and stage performer. Between 2004 and 2005, she wrote a series of columns for BBC News Online South Asia. She is the founder of the production company PZNZ Media, a co-owner of the Indian Premier League cricket team Punjab Kings since 2008, and the owner of the South-African T20 Global League cricket team Stellenbosch Kings since 2017. Zinta is known in the Indian media for publicly speaking her mind and consequently has sparked the occasional controversy. These controversies include her being the sole witness not to retract in court her earlier statements against the Indian mafia during the 2004 Bharat Shah case, for which she was awarded the Godfrey Phillips National Bravery Award.

== Early life and background ==
Preity Zinta was born on 31 January 1975 into a Hindu Rajput family from Shimla district, Himachal Pradesh. Her father, Durganand Zinta, was an officer in the Indian Army. He died in a car accident when she was thirteen; the accident also involved her mother, Nilprabha, who was severely injured and consequently remained bedridden for two years. Zinta called the tragic accident and her father's death a significant turning point in her life, which forced her to mature rapidly. She has two brothers; Deepankar and Manish, a year older and a year younger, respectively. Deepankar is a commissioned officer in the Indian Army, while Manish lives in California.

Zinta, who describes herself as having been a tomboy as a child, has emphasised her father's military background as having given her a lasting impression on how family life was to be conducted. He asserted the importance of discipline and punctuality to the children. She studied at the Convent of Jesus and Mary boarding school in Shimla. Although she confesses to loneliness in the boarding school, she noted that it was compensated by her finding a "... perfect set of friends" there. As a student, she developed a love for literature, particularly the works of William Shakespeare and poetry. According to Zinta, she enjoyed schoolwork and received good grades; in her free time she played sports, especially basketball.

After her schooling at Convent of Jesus and Mary, Zinta enrolled at St. Bede's College in Shimla, an affiliated college of Himachal Pradesh University. She graduated with an English honours degree, and then started a graduate programme in psychology. She earned a postgraduate degree in criminal psychology, but later took up modelling. Zinta's first television commercial was for Perk chocolates, the result of a chance meeting with a director at a friend's birthday party in 1996. The director persuaded Zinta to audition for the spot, and she was selected. Afterwards, she appeared in other catalogues and commercials, including one for the soap Liril.

== Acting career ==
=== Debut and early roles (1998–1999) ===
In 1998, Zinta met Shekhar Kapur when she accompanied a friend to an audition in Mumbai and was asked if she would audition too. Upon seeing her audition, Kapur insisted that she become an actress. She was originally scheduled to make her screen debut in Kapur's Tara Rum Pum Pum opposite Hrithik Roshan, but the filming was cancelled. She reminisced the experience: "I began to recognise the power of destiny. I had no intention ever to be an actress." Kapur later recommended her for director Mani Ratnam's Dil Se.. (1998), a romantic thriller about a terrorist group in New Delhi. Zinta often recalls that when she joined the film industry her friends teased her that she would typically "wear white saris and dance in the rain", thereby motivating her to seek unconventional parts.

Zinta commenced shooting for Kundan Shah's Kya Kehna, whose release was delayed until 2000. The delay of another film, Soldier (1998), meant that her first release was Dil Se.. opposite Shahrukh Khan and Manisha Koirala. She was introduced as Preeti Nair, a middle-class Delhi girl and Khan's fiancée. The film was considered an unusual launch for a newcomer, as her role called for only twenty minutes of screen time. However, she was eventually noticed for her role, particularly for the forthright character she played. Her scene with Khan, in which she asked him, "Are you a virgin?", became well-known, and her portrayal earned her a nomination for the Filmfare Award for Best Supporting Actress. Khalid Mohamed of Bombay Talkies said that she "radiates confidence and spunk even if she's given just scraps of footage". The film did not attract a wide audience in India but was the first Hindi film to enter the UK's top 10 box-office charts. Zinta's second release of 1998 was Abbas–Mustan-directed action-drama Soldier, one of the biggest commercial hits of the year. She won the Filmfare Award for Best Female Debut for her performance in both Dil Se.. and Soldier.

Zinta next acted in two Telugu films, Premante Idera (1998) and Raja Kumarudu (1999). She followed with the leading role in Sangharsh, a 1999 thriller directed by Tanuja Chandra and written by Mahesh Bhatt. Zinta portrayed Reet Oberoi, a Central Bureau of Investigation (CBI) officer who falls in love with a captured killer played by Akshay Kumar. Having been impressed with Zinta's work in Dil Se.., Chandra approached her for the part after several leading actresses had refused the offer, which Zinta viewed as an opportunity to expand her range. Sangharsh was not a box-office success, although Zinta's performance received favourable comments by critics. An article published by The Tribune described her performance as "an amazing act" in an "intense film", documenting her career path thus far with the observation: "She wowed the audiences with her cameo in Dil Se.., then she zapped the viewers with her sensuality in Soldier and now Preity Zinta is all set to shock everybody with her stark performance [in Sangharsh]." Subhash K. Jha reflected in 2013 that Sangharsh marked a rare occasion in Hindi cinema at the time where a top male star played a secondary role to the leading lady.

=== Breakthrough and career advancement (2000–2002) ===
Zinta's first role in 2000 was in the drama Kya Kehna, which exceeded expectations to emerge a major box-office success. The film addressed themes of single parenthood and teenage pregnancy, and gained Zinta wider recognition from the public as well as film critics. Her portrayal of Priya Bakshi, a teenage single mother who fights social prejudice, earned her several award nominations, including her first nomination for Best Actress at the Filmfare Awards. Anupama Chopra from India Today reported that Zinta belonged to a new breed of Hindi film actors that breaks away from character stereotypes. Further positive feedback came her way that year for her starring role in the romantic comedy Har Dil Jo Pyar Karega. She next appeared alongside Sanjay Dutt and Hrithik Roshan in Vidhu Vinod Chopra's drama Mission Kashmir (2000). Set in the valley of Kashmir during the Indo-Pakistani conflicts, the film dealt with the topic of terrorism and crime; it was an economic success, becoming the year's third-highest-grossing release in India. Zinta's role was that of Sufiya Parvez, a TV reporter and Roshan's childhood love. A review in The Hindu noted her for lending colour to an otherwise serious subject matter, and she shared similar sentiments about the character, citing its positive nature within the dark film as having sparked her interest in the part.

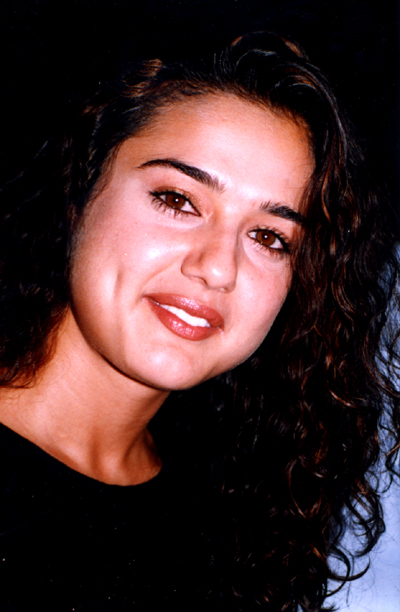
Zinta at the audio release of Chori Chori Chupke Chupke in 2001

In 2001, Zinta was paired with Sunny Deol in the action film Farz. Her role was dismissed by critics, and the film failed commercially. Abbas–Mustan's family drama Chori Chori Chupke Chupke was released later that year after a one-year delay due to the trial of producer Bharat Shah and opened to a wide audience. One of the first Hindi films to address the controversial issue of surrogate childbirth, it starred Zinta as Madhubala, a golden-hearted prostitute hired as a surrogate mother. Initially reluctant to play the part, she eventually accepted it at the directors' persuasion and, to prepare for it, visited several bars and nightclubs at Mumbai's red-light areas to study the lingo and mannerisms of sex-workers. Reviews of the film were varied, but critics singled out Zinta for praise. She received a second Best Supporting Actress nomination at the Filmfare Awards for her performance, of which reviewer Sukanya Verma wrote: "Preity Zinta, who clearly has the meatiest part of all, makes the best of it. Her transformation from the cocky and unabashed prostitute to a sensitive and warm person is amazingly believable."

Two more 2001 releases featured Zinta, including Farhan Akhtar's coming-of-age Dil Chahta Hai. Depicting the contemporary routine life of Indian affluent youth, it focuses on a period of transition in the lives of three young friends (Aamir Khan, Saif Ali Khan and Akshaye Khanna). Zinta played Aamir Khan's love interest Shalini, who is conflicted about her upcoming, loveless marriage. Dil Chahta Hai was popular with critics, some of whom believed it broke new ground with an unusually realistic portrayal of India's urban milieu. It was named Best Feature Film in Hindi at the 49th National Film Awards and received the Filmfare Critics Award for Best Film. A moderate box-office success in India, it performed well in the big cities but failed in the rural areas, which was attributed by trade analysts to the city-oriented lifestyle it presented. Dinesh Raheja took note of Zinta's "casual and appealing acting", and Sita Menon described her as "beautiful and vibrant, wavering between endearingly naive and confused". Next followed Deepak Shivdasani's Yeh Raaste Hain Pyaar Ke, a romantic drama co-starring Ajay Devgn and Madhuri Dixit which was commercially and critically unsuccessful.

In 2002, Zinta collaborated once again with director Kundan Shah, as the protagonist in the family drama Dil Hai Tumhaara, alongside Rekha, Mahima Chaudhry and Arjun Rampal. She played Shalu, an adopted daughter craving love, a role she identified with due to its rebellious nature. Billed as a star vehicle for Zinta, Dil Hai Tumhaara did not succeed financially, but her portrayal was uniformly acclaimed by critics, with those critical of the film marking her presence as its main highlight. Taran Adarsh from entertainment portal Bollywood Hungama noted: "... Preity Zinta, in an author-backed role ... steals the show with a sterling performance ... Here's a performance that is sure to win accolades from the junta and critics whole-heartedly."

=== Established actress (2003–2007) ===
Zinta's career surged significantly in 2003 as she was the lead in India's three highest-grossing films of the year: The Hero: Love Story of a Spy, Koi... Mil Gaya and Kal Ho Naa Ho. The Hero, co-starring Sunny Deol and Priyanka Chopra, is an action drama about a Research and Analysis Wing (RAW) secret agent on a mission to gather intelligence about terrorist activity from across the border of Kashmir. Zinta played the part of Reshma, a Kashmiri villager who falls in love with the agent and becomes part of this network. The film, involving stunts never seen before in the cinematic history of Bollywood, became the most expensive Hindi film ever produced at the time. The third-highest-grossing film of the year, it was labelled a disappointment against its high production costs.

She next starred in Honey Irani's directorial debut, Armaan; the drama is set in a hospital and follows the travails of its personnel and its principal, Dr. Akash (Anil Kapoor), who struggles arduously to sustain the institution financially and enters into a marriage of convenience to save it. Zinta played Akash's egocentric, excessively possessive and capricious wife Sonia Kapoor, a role written specially for her and which she considered her best to that point. The film received predominantly positive reviews, and Zinta was particularly praised. Khalid Mohamed called her a "peppy scene-stealer, achieving her manic mood swings dexterously", and Vinayak Chakravorty of Hindustan Times concluded that she "takes over the script and, indeed, the film" with "a brilliant act". For her performance, she received nominations for Best Performance in a Negative Role at different award ceremonies, including Filmfare.

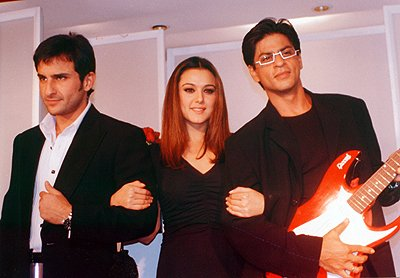
Zinta pictured with Saif Ali Khan (left) and Shah Rukh Khan at an event for Kal Ho Naa Ho in 2003

Rakesh Roshan's science-fiction film Koi... Mil Gaya, about a developmentally disabled young man (Hrithik Roshan) coming in contact with an alien, followed. Zinta's portrayal of Nisha, a young woman whom Roshan befriends and falls in love with, was deemed "fresh and inspired" by The Times of India. Regarded as the "most novel Bollywood movie of the year" by Empire magazine, the film emerged as India's most popular film of the year with a domestic total of ₹680 million (equivalent to ₹2.7 billion or US$29 million in 2026). It went on to spawn two superhero sequels—Krrish and Krrish 3—making it the first of the Krrish film series, to which Zinta did not proceed.

Set in New York City, Nikhil Advani's romantic drama Kal Ho Naa Ho starred Zinta as Naina Catherine Kapur, an insecure and irritable Indian-American who falls for a man with a fatal heart disease (Shah Rukh Khan). The film earned over ₹750 million (equivalent to ₹3.0 billion or US$32 million in 2026) worldwide: the second-biggest hit of the year after Koi... Mil Gaya in India and the top-grossing Hindi film overseas. Critics received Kal Ho Naa Ho favourably, and Ram Kamal Mukherjee of Stardust asserted that it exclusively rested on Zinta's "astounding performance", noting her for having "skillfully handled the hues of the complex character". At the 49th Filmfare Awards, Zinta received two Best Actress nominations: one for Koi... Mil Gaya, which was named Best Film, and another for Kal Ho Naa Ho, for which she won the award, in addition to accolades from other functions, including IIFA and Stardust.

In 2004, Zinta played TV journalist Romila Dutta in Farhan Akhtar's war drama Lakshya, alongside Hrithik Roshan. The film is based on the historical events of the 1999 Kargil War, and Zinta's character is modelled after Barkha Dutt, the only female reporter who covered the conflict. She called it the toughest film she had worked on and said it made her respect journalists. To provide an accurate portrayal, she watched a number of Dutt's television shows and read books on the conflict. The film was a critical success, yet her performance received mixed reviews; Namrata Joshi of Outlook likened her to "a teenybopper trying to do a TV news reading skit for her college fest", and Rediff.com's Rajeev Pai observed that despite a good part, she only "does a fairly decent job of it without ever being spectacular". Lakshya failed to attract an audience, grossing ₹235.6 million (US$2.5 million) against its ₹330 million (US$3.5 million) budget.

For the lead part in his cross-border romance Veer-Zaara (2004), Yash Chopra was looking for an actress whose "look and personality could be transformed". Having identified this opportunity in Zinta, who was mostly known for playing westernised characters, he cast her in the title role of Zaara Haayat Khan, a feisty Pakistani woman whose love story with Indian officer Veer Pratap Singh (Shah Rukh Khan) spans three decades amid trials and tribulations. Highly anticipated pre-release, the film had a strong international release, including a screening at the Berlin International Film Festival, and was named Best Film at major Indian award functions. With revenues of over ₹940 million (equivalent to ₹3.6 billion or US$39 million in 2026), it was that year's top-grossing Hindi film both in India and abroad. Zinta's part required her to master the fine nuances of the Urdu language. Though excited at first, she later "got knots in her stomach" worrying about her performance, but Chopra assured her. Her work resulted in a fourth Filmfare Best Actress nomination, among others. Jitesh Pillai wrote of her "tremendous restraint", and Avijit Ghosh of The Telegraph likewise believed she had delivered her most nuanced performance. Derek Elley of Variety hailed her as "the most interesting young actress of her generation". Veer-Zaara was Zinta's second highest-grossing film and third major success in two consecutive years.

Zinta starred opposite Govinda in the 2005 folk comedy Khullam Khulla Pyaar Karen, a production that had been delayed since 2002. The film garnered negative reviews and poor box office returns, and Subhash K. Jha found Zinta's work to be incompatible with her screen image and acting style. Critics and moviegoers were more appreciative that year of Siddharth Anand's comedy-drama Salaam Namaste, which saw Zinta and Saif Ali Khan as a contemporary cohabiting Indian couple in Australia dealing with an unexpected pregnancy. Produced on a big budget by Yash Raj Films, it was the first Indian feature filmed entirely in Australia and became the year's highest-grossing Indian production outside of India and overall third-highest-grossing Hindi film, earning ₹572 million (equivalent to ₹2.1 billion or US$23 million in 2026). Zinta received a number of Best Actress nominations for playing the protagonist Ambar Malhotra, a single modern young woman who leaves India to make her own life in Melbourne and works as a radio host while studying medicine. Devyani Srivastava of Mid-Day considered the independent, strong-minded character of Ambar to be a rare Hindi film heroine, and Taran Adarsh argued that Zinta had given "her most accomplished performance to date". Anita Gates of The New York Times noted Ambar's negative shades but admired Zinta's positive personality, by which she remains likable even despite uncharitable traits in her characters.

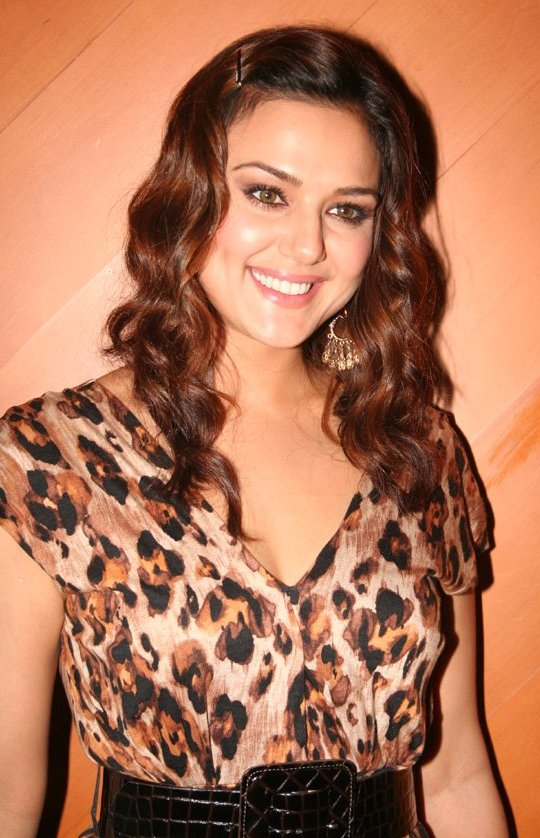
Zinta at a promotional event for Jaan-E-Mann in 2006

Zinta received further success in 2006, starring in Karan Johar's drama Kabhi Alvida Naa Kehna alongside Shah Rukh Khan, Rani Mukerji, Abhishek Bachchan, and Amitabh Bachchan. The film became one of the biggest box-office hits in India, earning ₹635 million (equivalent to ₹2.2 billion or US$24 million in 2026), and grossed over ₹496 million (equivalent to ₹1.7 billion or US$19 million in 2026) abroad—the biggest Bollywood success of all time in the overseas market up until then. It was Zinta's fourth overseas top-earner in four consecutive years. Revolving around two unhappily married couples in New York, the film featured Zinta as Rhea Saran, an ambitious fashion magazine editor whose husband begins an adulterous affair with a family acquaintance. She described the part as an attempt to shed her vivacious public image. Kabhi Alvida Naa Kehna polarised critics, but The Indian Express approved of Zinta's effort, noting her for having "walked with poise, sat with grace, smiled with composure and spoken with calmness". Other reviews questioned the limited length of her role. In later years, Filmfare and Verve lauded the character for breaking stereotypes of screen portrayals of married women in Hindi films.

Zinta next appeared in Shirish Kunder's romantic musical Jaan-E-Mann (2006). She played Piya, the cynosure of two men in the United States (Salman Khan and Akshay Kumar). The film opened to mixed reviews from critics and its eventual box office profit was poor. Despite being mostly criticised for taking a role of minimal importance, she was complimented on her performance and appearance. She said the film was a great relief after the more emotionally intense Kabhi Alvida Naa Kehna, as Jaan-E-Mann was "easy, happy and much more simple". Even less successful was her next turn as British Pakistani woman Alvira Khan in her third project with Yash Raj Films, the musical comedy Jhoom Barabar Jhoom (2007), co-starring Abhishek Bachchan, Bobby Deol and Lara Dutta. The film was a commercial failure in India and critics panned her performance; The Times of India described her as "too plastic" and Rediff.com concluded, "From accent to emotion, Preity is plain and simple insufferable in this film."

=== Professional expansion (2007–2008) ===
Following the failure of two of her commercial releases, Zinta decided to venture into art films, a movement of neo-realistic films known in India as parallel cinema. She acted alongside Amitabh Bachchan in her first English-language film, Rituparno Ghosh's film-within-a-film drama The Last Lear (2007). Zinta played Shabnam, a struggling film actress working on a new project opposite Shakespearean actor Harish Mishra (Bachchan) in the midst of a turbulent relationship with her possessive husband. The film premiered at the 2007 Toronto International Film Festival and was received well. Later reviews in India were approving, with Rajeev Masand writing that she "gets through her scenes competently, never allowing her cute-as-a-button image to take away from the impact she makes here as a conflicted, mature woman". Sukanya Verma called Zinta "palpably vulnerable" but lamented the English dialogue, finding it distracting "from the seriousness of the situation". The Last Lear was named the Best English Film at the 55th National Film Awards. Initially dismissive of art films, Zinta eventually spoke positively of her experiment with the genre, confessing, "I did think with art films that they don't pay you, they don't feed you, but I was wrong, and I'm so happy to be here."

Zinta next starred in Samir Karnik's Heroes (2008), a three-chapter road movie about two film students who, as part of an assignment, travel across North India to deliver three un-posted letters written by army personnel who lost their lives during the 1999 Kargil War to their families. Zinta is featured in the first chapter as Salman Khan's war widow, Kuljeet Kaur, a woman who becomes the sole breadwinner of the family and single-handedly raises her son. In preparation for the role Zinta attended Anupam Kher's acting school, "Actor Prepares" to learn the dialect and mannerisms of a Punjabi woman. The film was released to a mixed critical reaction, but her performance received rave reviews; Anand Singh of Hindustan Times wrote: "Karnik is merely interested in wringing tears the old-fashioned way, and not in starting a debate. He succeeds—mainly because Preity Zinta brings to a role a gravitas and dignity that is seen on the faces of ordinary women—this may be her coming of age as an actress."

In the same year she played the leading role of Chand in Deepa Mehta's Canadian film Heaven on Earth, a Punjabi-language mystical drama based on the true story of a young Indian woman who, after an arranged marriage to a non-resident Indian man from Canada, migrates to Toronto and becomes a victim of severe domestic abuse. Zinta described Mehta as one director she was longing to work with to fulfill her desire for "a new kind of acting challenge". To prepare for the part, she studied extensively the subject of domestic violence and took a crash course in Punjabi, a language that was totally alien to her. She confessed to not being able to emotionally disconnect from the part during the making of the film: "I never knew a character would affect me so deeply. I've become completely withdrawn and introspective ... I can't snap out of the character." She eventually called it her most challenging project, as it helped her "shed everything that Preity Zinta was about". Heaven on Earth was first screened at several film festivals and garnered career-best reviews for Zinta. Peter Debruge of Variety wrote of her "stunning psychological transformation" in the part and Will Sloan of Exclaim! labelled her "a revelation". Her performance earned her the Silver Hugo Award for Best Actress at the 2008 Chicago International Film Festival, for "her strong yet subtle performance as a woman struggling to keep her dreams despite brutal realities". She was also nominated for the Genie Award for Best Actress.

=== Hiatus and occasional returns (2009–present) ===
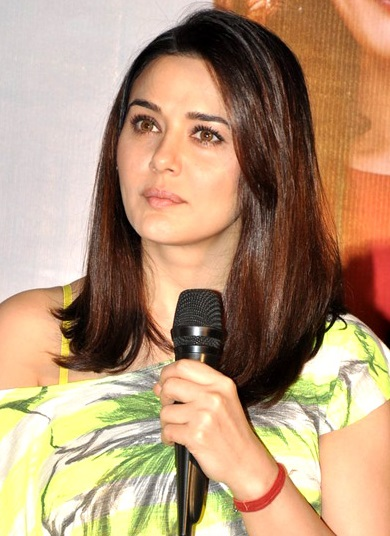
Zinta at a promotional event for Ishkq in Paris in 2013

Following Heaven on Earth, Zinta took a two-year sabbatical from films, later explaining that she had chosen to focus on her work with her cricket team. In 2011, she launched her own production company, PZNZ Media. Two years later and following numerous delays, she starred in her first film under the banner – the Prem Raj-directed romantic comedy Ishkq in Paris, which she also co-wrote. An Indo-French collaboration, the film saw Zinta as a half-Indian half-French Parisian woman alongside Rhehan Malliek and Isabelle Adjani. Zinta's role required her to learn French and follow a strict diet and fitness regime, for which she hired the services of celebrity trainer Tracy Anderson. Whilst the film bombed at the box office and received mostly negative reviews, Zinta's performance attracted a mixed critical reception. Sonia Chopra of Sify called her "hugely likeable", and added that she is a "good actress, astute producer and ... writer". Shilpa Jamkhandikar from Deccan Herald, critical of both the film and Zinta's work, concluded a scathing review by calling it "a mediocre film, one that was supposed to showcase one of our favourite leading ladies, but instead just shows us what a shadow of her past she's become".

Following a five-year sabbatical, Zinta starred opposite Sunny Deol as an aggressive Varanasi-based wife in Neeraj Pathak's action comedy Bhaiaji Superhit (2018). Ajit Duara of Open magazine called the film a "rude, sexist, and completely mixed-up farce" and bemoaned that the "once vivacious [Zinta] appears completely disinterested in her surroundings and in her co-actors". In 2020, Zinta appeared alongside Vir Das in an episode of the American sitcom Fresh Off the Boat, titled "The Magic Motor Inn"; she was set to reprise her role in a spin-off series, centered around her character's family, but it eventually did not materialise.

After another eight-year hiatus, Zinta returned to films with Batwara 1947, a period drama co-starring Sunny Deol, directed by Rajkumar Santoshi and produced by Aamir Khan. Based on Asghar Wajahat's play Jis Lahore Nai Vekhya, O Jamya E Nai, the film starred Zinta and Deol as a Muslim refugee couple who migrate from the United Provinces in India to a haveli in Lahore, Pakistan during the 1947 Partition, only to be conflicted by the discovery of an elderly Hindu widow still defiantly living inside. The film received mixed-to-negative reviews from critics, and was a box-office disaster. Still, critics reacted positively to Zinta's portrayal of Hamida Mirza, with Deepa Gahlot finding her to be "excellent as the supportive wife who rouses her husband's conscience". Zinia Bandyopadhyay from Firstpost noted Zinta's "warmth and familiarity" in the part despite its limited scope within the story.

Next followed Vibe, released a month later, co-starring, written and directed by Kunal Khemu. The film features Zinta as Madam H, an intelligence agency chief who forcefully recruits two clueless civilians (Khemu and Sparsh Shrivastava) to thwart a national terrorist threat. Zinta accepted the film as it offered her a first full-fledged action role which she had long anticipated, coinciding with Khemu's desire to cast her against type. Bhavna Agarwal of India Today stated, "Zinta plays the straight woman to the madness without becoming merely functional."

== Other work ==
=== Column writing ===
In 2004, Zinta joined a group of South Asian commentators for BBC News Online. She expressed joy at participating in the project, saying, "I am pretty outspoken and have my own view on every subject. So it will be a good platform for me to air my views." Her first column, "The changing face of Bollywood", published in January 2004, discussed the evolution of Bollywood in the past decade. The column became one of the site's ten most read stories of the day. In her second column, "Odds stacked against Indian women", Zinta analysed the eve teasing phenomenon in India, and criticised those who practice it. She wrote, "Incidents like these take away a woman's dignity, her space and her freedom ... why the state is so helpless in protecting the women. Why should women feel unsafe in a country which had an internationally revered woman prime minister?" The column caught the attention of readers worldwide, and she received thousands of e-mails about it. It was applauded particularly by women for its stand against abuse of Indian women. Her third column, "The darkness that all actors fear", was a more personal column and dealt with her stardom, fans, insecurity and fears as an actor. Her fourth and final column, titled "Facing death in Sri Lanka and Thailand", described her two near-death experiences in late 2004.

=== Stage performances and television presenting ===
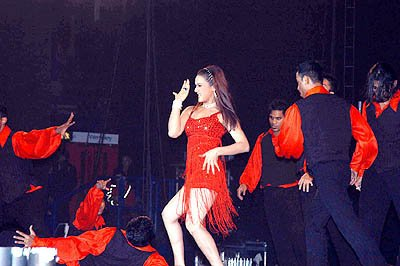
Zinta performing at "Temptation 2004"

Zinta has taken part in several stage shows and world tours since 2001. Her first world tour, a series of concerts called "Craze 2001", was performed across the US alongside Anil Kapoor, Aamir Khan, Aishwarya Rai and Gracy Singh. The show faced early cancellation due to the 11 September 2001 attacks, and the team prepared to return to India as soon as possible. However, the shows continued successfully in Canada. In 2002, she participated in the show "From India With Love" in the UK, along with Amitabh Bachchan, Aamir Khan, Shah Rukh Khan and Aishwarya Rai. It took place at two outdoor venues, Manchester's Old Trafford and London's Hyde Park, with more than 100,000 spectators.

Zinta's largest world tour was in 2004, when she joined a group of stars (Shah Rukh Khan, Rani Mukerji, Saif Ali Khan, Arjun Rampal and Priyanka Chopra) in the "Temptation 2004" tour. Showcased in more than 22 countries across the world, it became Bollywood's most prominent international concert. In 2006, Zinta was part of the "Heat 2006" world tour, along with Akshay Kumar, Saif Ali Khan, Sushmita Sen and Celina Jaitley. "The Unforgettable Tour" (2008) saw Zinta performing with the Bachchan family and Ritesh Deshmukh in a forty-day show staged in eleven cities across North America, Europe and the Caribbean. In December 2012 Zinta returned to the stage with the "Temptation Reloaded" concert in Jakarta (joined by Shah Rukh Khan, Rani Mukerji and Bipasha Basu).

In 2011, Zinta made her television debut as the host of the show Guinness World Records – Ab India Todega on Colors Channel. An Indian version of Guinness Book of World Records, the show premiered on 18 March to an audience measurement of 3.3 rating points, which made it occupy the seventh position on the chart of celebrity-driven reality shows on Hindi entertainment channels. In a four-star review for Hindustan Times, critic Rachana Dubey wrote, "Preity is a riot. She's vivacious and knows exactly when she needs to be serious and when she can crack jokes." Later that year Zinta started hosting the celebrity-based chat show Up Close & Personal with PZ, shot at her own penthouse in Mumbai and broadcast on the newly launched channel UTV Stars. The first episode aired on 3 September. In 2015, Zinta featured as a talent judge for the seventh season of the dance reality show Nach Baliye.

=== Humanitarian work ===
During her years in the film industry, Zinta has been involved with different charitable organisations and has particularly supported women's causes in India, for instance protesting against female infanticide. She has also participated in AIDS awareness drives and campaigns to clean up Mumbai.

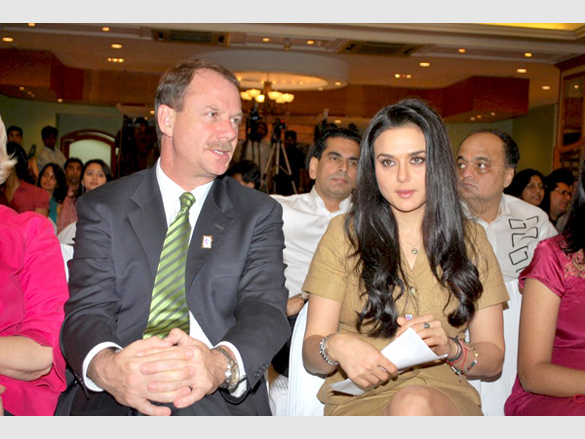
Zinta at an event against child trafficking in 2012

Along with other Bollywood stars, Zinta performed at the "HELP! Telethon Concert" in 2005 to raise money for victims of the 2004 Indian Ocean earthquake. The following year, as an ambassador of the Godfrey Phillips National Bravery Movement, Zinta attended a blood donation camp organised by the Rotary Club of Delhi and the Godfrey Phillips Awards. She lent her support to the cause of women's empowerment and promoted blood donation. She said, "Donating blood doesn't kill one but goes on to save somebody's life ... Once blood is donated it becomes universal and might be used by anyone in need, irrespective of community, caste or region. It binds people together."

In 2007, as part of the NDTV show Jai Jawan, Zinta visited Hisar, Haryana, where she spent a day at the army training base to boost the morale of the jawan troops and met children with disabilities at a special school maintained by the army. In August, along with Mumbai-based artist Gurcharan Singh, Zinta painted for the cause of street children for the non-governmental organisation Khushi. In December she joined the efforts of the United Nations Office on Drugs and Crime (UNODC) to curb human trafficking in India. She spoke on behalf of awareness against the practice, the need for protection and rehabilitation for those rescued from it, and punishment for perpetrators. In 2009, on her 34th birthday, Zinta launched a personal humanitarian initiative by taking 34 girls from the Mother Miracle orphanage in Rishikesh under her patronage. The program entails long-term sponsorship from Zinta, who committed to providing comprehensive financial support for the girls' education and overall upbringing, as well as visiting them on a regular basis. Expressing her excitement at the decision, she described the process as a lifelong adoption, stating, "These are my children now, my responsibility".

In January 2010 Zinta was appointed the brand ambassador of The Loomba Trust, an organisation that works for the welfare of widows and their children. She said, having lost her father at thirteen, she could relate to the problems faced by widowed women. Later in the year, she joined the Joint United Nations Programme on HIV/AIDS (UNAIDS) as their Goodwill Ambassador in India, to promote public awareness on HIV prevention, treatment and support, with emphasis on women and children, and combat discrimination against it. Speaking of her appointment, Zinta expressed hope to be "the voice for the voiceless" and bring about a "transformation in the minds of people" through collaborative work. In October 2010 Zinta was awarded an Honorary Doctorate of Arts from the University of East London. It was awarded in honour of both her cultural contribution and her humanitarian work, with the citation describing her as "an international actress, pioneering star of Hindi cinema and devoted humanitarian. Preity has carved a path for women to follow."

=== Ownership of cricket teams ===
Along with Ness Wadia, Mohit Burman and others, Zinta acquired ownership rights in 2008 for the Mohali-based Twenty20 cricket team of the Indian Premier League (IPL). The group paid $76 million for the franchise and named the team Kings XI Punjab (it was renamed Punjab Kings in 2021). Until 2009, Zinta was the only woman to own an IPL team, and was the league's youngest owner. She has been involved with launching ticket sales and promoting the team. She said, "My involvement with the team is total. I am extremely passionate about our team and I do believe that I am the team's good luck factor, so I want to be there for everything." In September 2017, she became the owner of the Stellenbosch Kings franchise team of South Africa's Mzansi Super League. Further business expansion took place in 2021 as Zinta and her Punjab Kings partners bought Saint Lucia's representative team in the Caribbean Premier League (CPL), which was rebranded as Saint Lucia Kings.

Work at CBFC

Zinta was selected as member of Central Board of Film Certification (CBFC) in 2026 for 3 years.

== Personal life ==
During her film career, Zinta's private life received significant media attention, including reported romantic linkages which she often denied, as well as involvement in several controversies. Zinta dated model Marc Robinson for a year before they separated on good terms in 2001. She was in a relationship with the Bombay Dyeing heir, businessman Ness Wadia from February 2005 until May 2009. Their partnership was the subject of considerable media coverage, with frequent speculation about an engagement or a break-up. On 13 June 2014, Zinta filed a complaint with the Mumbai police against Wadia alleging he had molested, threatened, and abused her at an IPL match at the Wankhede Stadium in Mumbai on 30 May. Wadia denied the allegations. In 2018, the Bombay High Court quashed this complaint after the issue was amicably settled.

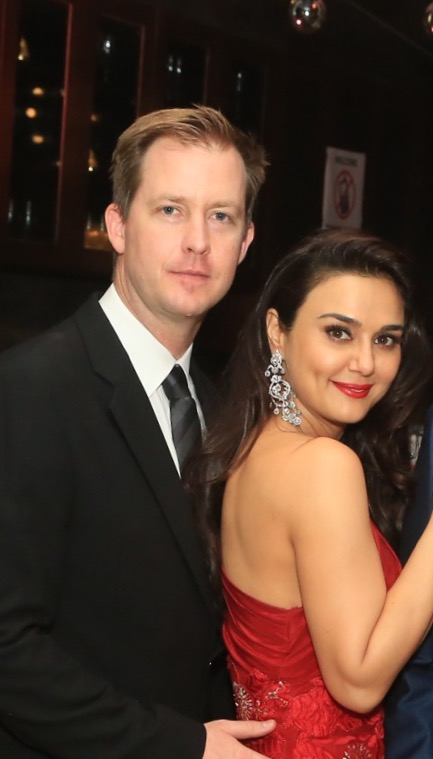
Zinta with her husband Gene Goodenough in 2016

On 29 February 2016, Zinta married her American partner Gene Goodenough at a private ceremony in Los Angeles. Goodenough is Senior Vice-president for Finance at NLine Energy, a US-based hydroelectric power company. Zinta moved to Los Angeles following the marriage; she visits India on a frequent basis. In 2021, she and her husband became parents to twins, a boy and a girl, through surrogacy.

While active in films, Zinta used to visit her native town Shimla when she was not busy shooting. In 2006, she moved into her own home in Mumbai where she lived until her marriage. She narrowly escaped death twice in late 2004: first after an explosion at a Temptation concert in Colombo, Sri Lanka; and second during the Indian Ocean earthquake. In a 2007 interview, she described her religious views as personal, emphasising faith in good deeds and karma over temple worship, and noting her growing belief that all religions are equal. In later years, following her marriage, she made frequent visits to temples during trips to India. She said that living abroad made her value her Indian identity more, and she shared her decision to raise her children as Hindus to instill in them their cultural and religious roots.

In 2003, as a witness in the highly-publicised Bharat Shah case, she testified against the organized crime syndicate in India involved in entertainment business. Bharat Shah, the financer of Chori Chori Chupke Chupke, was arrested in 2000 for having connections with Chhota Shakeel, a Mumbai underworld boss. Unlike several of her colleagues, Zinta repeated in court her earlier statement that she had received extortion threats from the mafia during the shooting of the film. After her testimony, she was given witness protection and was forced to stay out of the public eye for two months. Thirteen other witnesses before her, including celebrities Salman Khan and Shahrukh Khan, were witnesses in the case but later retracted their earlier statements. Zinta was the only witness who did not become hostile to the prosecution. Her actions met with nationwide public resonance and applause. Consequently, she was the first recipient of Godfrey's Mind of Steel Award at the annual Red and White Bravery Awards, given to her for the "courageous act" of standing against the Mumbai Underworld. On receiving the award, she said, "To be brave is not to be fearless. It is when you fear and you get over it, then you can be called brave. I am human. It is not that I fear nothing. But getting over a fear is a continuous process and I have been successful so far." Since 2006, Zinta has been the brand ambassador for the Godfrey Phillips Bravery awards.

== Image and artistry ==
Zinta is known in the Indian media for her straightforward nature and for honestly expressing her opinions in public, be it about her on-screen or off-screen life or her raising a voice against social injustice. While she does not believe she is "as tough as people portray [her] to be", she asserts having no qualms about speaking her mind, even if faced with surmounting opposition, as long as she stands "by what's right". These features were noted during the Bharat Shah case, when she testified against the underworld; following this incident she was often called by journalists "the only man in Bollywood", a label she was unhappy with for its underlying misogynist connotations. Film actor Amitabh Bachchan, describing her as "frank and painfully honest", lauded her "drive and guts in a world that can be most cruel to a single girl". Author and columnist Shobhaa De, while commending her for lodging a molestation complaint against Ness Wadia in 2014, expressed concern regarding Zinta's repeated quest for justice, believing it could eventually play against her: "India is not terribly kind to strong-willed, outspoken women who are dubbed 'trouble makers' if they dare to raise their voices, especially against men. Zinta is such a woman."

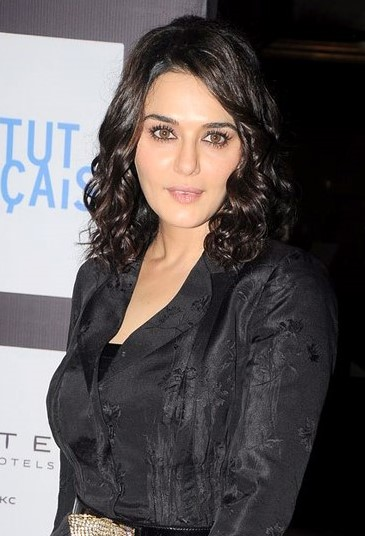
Zinta in 2012

The media have cited her characteristic dimple as her trademark. At the beginning of her career, the press often described her as having a vivacious personality and a bubbly, outgoing persona, an image she had confessed to disliking. According to film critic Sukanya Verma, Zinta's energetic nature extends from her real life into her screen appearances and is an integral part of her technique. Discussing Hindi film actresses and their flair for comedy, Verma wrote of Zinta: "What can you say about an actress who giggles non-stop in a tone that is anything but prim and propah? She is carefree. She is animated. She talks non-stop. She laughs all the time. She has a chilled out sense of humour. And a tomboyish streak too. Preity Zinta is all that and more. All this greatly contributes to her style of acting."

Director Tanuja Chandra ascribed Zinta's screen appeal to her lack of acting pretense, commenting, "She doesn't act, she's so real that you just can't look away from her." Reviewing Chori Chori Chupke Chupke (2001) for Hindustan Times, Vinayak Chakravorty noted that "there is an admirable zest that Preity pumps into every role she does". Farhan Akhtar, who directed her in two films, believes she is an actress who "can mould herself – the way she speaks, works and her body language – and adapt herself to roles", while Vidhu Vinod Chopra (director of the 2000 film Mission Kashmir) credits her with the ability to "make the viewer believe even in the most convoluted situation." In a review of Salaam Namaste, Australian film critic Jake Wilson observed, "While Preity Zinta isn't the subtlest actress, she's quite a comedienne – for a Hollywood equivalent to her combination of beauty, high-strung emotion and facial gymnastics you might have to go back to Natalie Wood." American critic Derek Elley considers her to be "one of Bollywood's best pure actresses."

Zinta's variety of characters, such as Dil Se (1998), Sangharsh (1999), Kya Kehna (2000), Chori Chori Chupke Chupke (2001), Salaam Namaste (2005) and Kabhi Alvida Naa Kehna (2006), gained her a reputation for playing roles that go against Indian traditional mores. These roles were cited by critics as having contributed to a new image for Indian screen women by means of departure from the conventional parts previously played by leading actresses in mainstream Hindi films. Karan Johar describes her as "a new-wave actress" who has the advantage of working at a time when "films portray a woman who knows her mind". The character of Preeti from Dil Se was noted by gender scholar Janell Hobson as one that breaks the stereotypes that Westerners have of South Asian women. Author Monika Mehta notes the similarity between Zinta's public image as an independent and opinionated woman and her culturally defiant character in Salaam Namaste. According to Jennifer Thomas, who analysed Zinta's roles for a chapter in the book Once Upon a Time in Bollywood (2007), Zinta "resists patriarchal constraints through her modern lifestyle and the controversial roles she chooses".

== In the media ==
Zinta is one of the best-known celebrities in India; at her career peak she was one of Hindi cinema's most celebrated stars and was acknowledged for having managed a career without any traditional assistance or family relations in the film industry. She featured in Box Office India's top actress listing for seven years and ranked first for two consecutive years (2003–2004). In its "All Time Top Actress" list, she was placed 6th. In 2003, Zinta appeared in the number one spot on Rediff.com's "Top Bollywood Female Stars". She was ranked second for the following three years. She has been featured frequently on other Rediff.com lists, including "Bollywood's Most Beautiful Actresses", "Bollywood's Best Dressed Women", "Bollywood's Wonder Woman", and "Women of Many Faces". Between 2006 and 2008 Zinta made three consecutive appearances at the Cannes Film Festival. At first she attended the 2006 Film Festival along with filmmaker Karan Johar to represent the Hindi film industry and promote Kabhi Alvida Naa Kehna, returning in later years as the brand ambassador of Chopard, the maker of luxury watches and jewellery.

In September 2006 the UK magazine Eastern Eye ranked her among "Asia's Sexiest Women". In 2010, Time magazine selected her as one of the candidates for its list of the world's 100 most influential people. She was the only Indian actress nominated for the poll and eventually did not make it to the final list, ranked at 144. In 2009, she received IIFA-FICCI Frames Awards, among 10 "Most Powerful Entertainers of the Decade". She was later honoured at Venice Film Festival, in 2011. Zinta has been a celebrity endorser for brands such as Mortein, Dabur Vatika, Head & Shoulders, BSNL and Himachal Pradesh Tourism. Since 2007, Zinta's popularity was on a decline and she lost out on her brand endorsements to a number of younger actresses. This was followed by further decline in popularity when she restricted her work in films, culminating the debacle of her self-produced comeback vehicle. Film journalists like Khalid Mohamed and Subhash K. Jha have written columns in which they lament her absence from the movies and encourage her to return to acting.

== Filmography and accolades ==
Zinta has acted in over 30 films. She has won two Filmfare Awards from ten nominations: Best Female Debut for Dil Se.. and Soldier and Best Actress for Kal Ho Naa Ho. She is among the few Indian actors to be nominated for a Genie Award and to win the main acting award at the Chicago International Film Festival.

== See also ==
- List of Indian film actresses
- List of people from Himachal Pradesh

== Bibliography ==
- Bingham, Adam (15 August 2015). Directory of World Cinema: India. Intellect Books. ISBN 978-1-84150-622-7.
- Chakravarti, Paromita (15 May 2017). "Reading Intertextualities in Rituporno Ghosh's The Last Lear: The Politics of Recanonization". In Chaudhuri, Sukanta (ed.). The Shakespearean International Yearbook: Volume 12: Special Section, Shakespeare in India. Routledge. pp. 115–129. ISBN 978-1-351-96358-9.
- Chaudhuri, Diptakirti (12 September 2014). Bollybook: The Big Book of Hindi Movie Trivia. Penguin UK. ISBN 978-93-5118-799-8.
- Clini, Clelia (2018). "Diasporic Dreams and Shattered Desires: Displacement, Identity and Tradition in Heaven on Earth". In Bayman, Louis; Pinazza, Natália (eds.). Journeys on Screen: Theory, Ethics, Aesthetics. Edinburgh University Press. ISBN 978-1-4744-2184-3.
- Dasgupta, Rohit K.; Datta, Sangeeta (2018). 100 Essential Indian Films. Rowman & Littlefield. ISBN 978-1-4422-7799-1.
- Dawar, Ramesh (2006). Bollywood: Yesterday, Today, Tomorrow. Star Publications. ISBN 978-1-9058-630-13.
- De, Sanchari; Sarwal, Amit (2016). "Old Wine in the New Bottle: Bollywood Films Shot in Australia after 9/11". In Kishore, Vikrant; Sarwal, Amit; Patra, Parichay (eds.). Salaam Bollywood: Representations and interpretations. Routledge. ISBN 978-1-317-23286-5.
- Dwyer, Rachel (2005). 100 Bollywood Films. Lotus Collection, Roli Books. ISBN 978-81-7436-433-3.
- Glaser, Ed (7 March 2022). How the World Remade Hollywood: Global Interpretations of 65 Iconic Films. McFarland. ISBN 978-1-4766-4467-7.
- Gulzar; Nihalani, Govind; Chatterjee, Saibal (2003). Encyclopaedia of Hindi Cinema. Popular Prakashan. ISBN 978-81-7991-066-5.
- Gopal, Sangita (2012). Conjugations: Marriage and Form in New Bollywood Cinema. University of Chicago Press. ISBN 978-0-226-30427-4.
- Hassam, Andrew (2010). "Salaam Namaste, Melbourne and Cosmopolitanism". In Hassam, Andrew; Paranjape, M. (eds.). Bollywood in Australia : Transnationalism and Cultural Production. Crawley: University of Western Australia Pub. pp. 63–86. ISBN 978-1-74258-270-2.
- Janell, Hobson (13 August 2008). "Militarizing Women in Film: Toward a Cinematic Framing of War and Terror". In Morgen, Sandra; Sutton, Barbara; Novkov, Julie (eds.). Security Disarmed: Critical Perspectives on Gender, Race, and Militarization. Rutgers University Press. pp. 231–243. ISBN 978-0-8135-4555-4.
- Jha, Subhash K. (2005a). The Essential Guide to Bollywood. Lustre Press. ISBN 978-81-7436-378-7.
- Kumar, Anup (2013). "Bollywood and the Diaspora: The Flip Side of Globalization and Cultural Hybridity in Kal Ho Na Ho and Salaam Namaste". In Medina-Rivera, Antonio; Wilberschied, Lee (eds.). Constructing Identities: the Interaction of National, Gender and Racial Borders. Cambridge Scholars Publishing. pp. 116–142. ISBN 978-1-4438-5092-6.
- Maitra, Smita (17 July 2015). "Greenathon: Organizing the Social-Conscience of Post-Liberalization Urban India". In Batabyal, Somnath (ed.). Environment, Politics and Activism: The Role of Media. Routledge. pp. 59–77. ISBN 978-1-317-34151-2.
- Mazumdar, Ranjani (2007). Bombay Cinema: An Archive of the City. University of Minnesota Press. ISBN 978-1-4529-1302-5.
- Krämer, Lucia (2017). "Adaptation in Bollywood". In Leitch, Thomas (ed.). The Oxford Handbook of Adaptation Studies. Oxford University Press. ISBN 978-0-19-933100-0.
- Mehta, Monika (2017). "Location and Agency in Crafting Habib Faisal's Authorship". In Viswamohan, Aysha Iqbal; John, Vimal Mohan (eds.). Behind the Scenes: Contemporary Bollywood Directors and Their Cinema. SAGE Publishing. ISBN 978-93-86062-41-3.
- Mishra, Vijay (2008). "Re-Mapping Bollywood Cinema: A Postcolonial Case-Study". In Donald, James; Renov, Michael (eds.). The SAGE Handbook of Film Studies. SAGE Publishing. ISBN 978-1-4739-7180-6.
- Omar, Fuad (1 June 2006). Bollywood: An Insider's Guide. Mayhem Publishing. ISBN 978-1-84728-009-1.
- Pande, Alka (2004). Ardhanarishvara, the Androgyne: Probing the Gender Within. Rupa & Company. ISBN 978-81-291-0464-9.
- Pervez, Muhammad Shoaib (2013). Security Community in South Asia: India-Pakistan. Routledge. ISBN 978-0-203-10626-6.
- Saleh, Ibrahim; Knieper, Thomas (12 November 2018). The Visual Politics of War Volume Two: Truth and Lies of Soft Power. Cambridge Scholars Publishing. ISBN 978-1-52752-141-4.
- Sen, Sharmila (2005). "No Passports, No Visas: The Line of Control Between India and Pakistan in Contemporary Bombay Cinema". In Morey, Peter; Tickell, Alex (eds.). Alternative Indias: Writing, Nation and Communalism. Rodopi. pp. 197–223. ISBN 978-90-420-1927-0.
- Thomas, Jennifer (2007). "Bollywood's Female Fantasies of Resistance: Online Fan Discourse and Modern Indian Identity". In Singh, Gurbir Jolly; Wadhwani, Zenia B.; Barretto, Deborah (eds.). Once Upon a Time in Bollywood: The Global Swing in Hindi Cinema. TSAR Publications. pp. 162–174. ISBN 978-1-8947-704-08.
- Mukherjee, Shreyosi (2023). "Women (Not) Telling Women's Stories: Tanuja Chandra's Directorial Journey from Action-Thriller to Romance and Beyond". In Viswamohan Iqbal, Aysha (ed.). Women Filmmakers in Contemporary Hindi Cinema: Looking through their Gaze. Springer International Publishing. pp. 79–95. doi:10.1007/978-3-031-10232-5_5. ISBN 978-3-031-10232-5.
