= Up Close & Personal with PZ =

- Presented by: Preity Zinta
- Country of origin: India

Production
- Camera setup: Nitesh choudhary
- Production company: Red Chillies Idiot Box

Original release
- Network: UTV Stars
- Release: 3 September – 12 November 2011

Up Close & Personal with PZ is an Indian celebrity-based chat show hosted by Preity Zinta and produced by Red Chillies Idiot Box and broadcast on UTV Stars, a newly launched channel by UTV. The show featured 10 of Zinta's favourite male colleagues. The first season wrapped up after completing 11 episodes in a span of three months. The first episode of the show aired on 3 September 2011 with Salman Khan as guest. It ended with Anil Kapoor as guest.

== Overview ==
The show has Bollywood celebrities having a one-on-one conversation with the actress/host. Set up at Preity’s very own penthouse that is decorated all pink by the actress, the show promises to reveal all things personal about the stars. The show also does its bit for the society where the stars and the host pose for a poster that will later be auctioned. The money garnered is donated to the NGO of the guest's choice. To make the show even more entertaining, Preity had also added some impromptu elements, like the guests need to enact a scene on a given situation.

== Episode list ==
#	Guest
1	Salman Khan
2	Hrithik Roshan
3	Farhan Akhtar
4	Arjun Rampal
5	Akshay Kumar
6	Yuvraj Singh
7	Shah Rukh Khan (I)
8	Shah Rukh Khan (II)
9	Bobby Deol
10	Saif Ali Khan
11	Anil Kapoor
