= Sangharsh (1999 film) =

1999 Indian film by Tanuja Chandra

- Theatrical release poster
- Directed by: Tanuja Chandra
- Written by: Mahesh Bhatt; Girish Dhamija
- Produced by: Mukesh Bhatt
- Starring: Akshay Kumar; Preity Zinta; Ashutosh Rana
- Cinematography: Teja
- Edited by: Amit Saxena
- Music by: Jatin–Lalit
- Production company: Vishesh Films
- Distributed by: Vishesh Films; Sony Pictures
- Release date: 3 September 1999
- Running time: 127 minutes
- Country: India
- Language: Hindi
- Budget: ₹ 40 million
- Box office: ₹ 105 million

Sangharsh (transl. Struggle) is a 1999 Indian Hindi-language psychological horror crime thriller film directed by Tanuja Chandra. It stars Akshay Kumar, Preity Zinta, Ashutosh Rana and Alia Bhatt, who made a cameo appearance as a child artist in this film, playing the younger version of Zinta's character. The film was said to be based on the 1991 film The Silence of The Lambs, but Chandra rejected this, claiming the film was based on a similar lost police case in India. The film opened to positive reviews, with critical acclaim for the performances by Kumar and Zinta, as well as Rana's villainous turn.

== Plot ==
A series of child abductions and murders has left the Mumbai Police perplexed and unable to solve the case. Consequently, the case is handed over to the CBI, who assign trainee Reet Oberoi to crack it. As she investigates, the evidence points towards Lajja Shankar Pandey, a religious fanatic who believes in sacrificing children to gain immortality.

Pandey's erratic behaviour and Reet's own traumas — witnessing her older brother Jassi, a terrorist, being gunned down by the police in their home — compel Reet to seek help from a prisoner unjustly implicated, the genius Professor Aman Verma. Reet visits Aman in his prison cell to ask for his help tracking the serial child killer. Aman completely ignores her official CBI credentials. He immediately shifts the focus to her body language, trembling hands, and anxious breathing. He accurately profiles her on the spot, exposing that she didn’t join the CBI out of pure patriotism, but out of a desperate need to conquer her own internal terrors.

Initially, Aman is rude and unwilling to assist Reet, but she eventually persuades him to help. The case becomes more challenging when Reet learns that Pandey has kidnapped the Home Minister's only child. Overwhelmed by the pressure, her childhood traumas, and phobias, Reet faces opposition from the local police, partly due to Verma's unconventional methods. As they spend more time together, he helps her conquer her fears, and they both fall in love. Aman was a highly intelligent university professor. He was falsely implicated in a major crime, which stripped him of his freedom and his academic career. His years in isolation hardened him, turning him deeply cynical, abrasive, and highly untrusting of authority figures like the CBI. Despite his bitter exterior, he possesses a profound, almost superhuman understanding of criminal psychology, human behaviour, and the occult.

The bloodspot on Professor Aman Verma's forehead is a self-inflicted gunshot wound from a previous suicide attempt. Before meeting Reet Oberoi, the professor was falsely accused of a major crime, stripped of his academic career, and thrown into a high-security prison. Driven to absolute despair by the injustice and the bleak reality of his life sentence, he tried to end his life by shooting himself in the head. He survived the gunshot, but the bullet left a permanent, dark scar and an indentation right in the middle of his forehead, this visible mark serves as a constant, eerie visual reminder of his tragic past, and his shattered psyche.

Because Aman uses extreme force against law enforcement and is a fugitive in their eyes, the police aggressively assault and strike him back in their attempts to subdue and recapture him. While he initially scoffs at Reet Oberoi's official credentials, he recognises her internal fears. His decision to help her serve as his path to dynamic redemption—allowing him to use his genius one last time to save innocent lives before his ultimate sacrifice.

Aman teaches Reet to step inside the mind of a fanatic rather than just analysing physical clues. He forces Reet to confront her own childhood trauma to build the psychological stamina needed to face the killer. Once the local authorities realise a highly dangerous inmate has been taken out of confinement illegally, a massive police manhunt is triggered to capture Aman and arrest Reet. When the police corner them, Aman goes full rogue. To protect Reet and ensure they can continue hunting the killer, he physically overpowers multiple armed police officers, beating them up to secure his and Reet's escape Following these illegal actually, the police order her arrest. However, she outsmarts the officers, kicks the ACP to escape, and goes entirely rogue to finish the investigation with Aman.

Exploiting Religious Myths and Superstition, Aman uses his knowledge of the occult to predict the killer's exact timeline based on lunar and solar cycles. The duo uses local myths, religious festivals, and ritualistic symbols to track down Lajja Shankar Pandey's hidden locations and going rogue bypassing Law Enforcement. Reet repeatedly breaks her CBI protocol, sneaks Aman out of his cell, and relies on his illegal help. The final showdown involves an unsanctioned raid during a solar eclipse.

Ultimately, they track down Pandey, who plans to perform his final sacrifice during a solar eclipse (Soorya Grahan), believing it will grant him immortality. Aman and Reet manage to rescue the child, however, during the confrontation, Aman sustains fatal injuries from the bites of Pandey and later he uses a rod to impale him is injured again fatally. In his final moments, enraged Aman and Reet share a kiss before he dies in her arms. Reet receives a hero's welcome and discovers a renewed sense of purpose within herself. Aman knew that even if he survived the mission, a life of permanent incarceration or being a hunted fugitive awaited him. By giving his life to defeat Pandey during the solar eclipse, he escapes his worldly cages permanently. He dies a hero on his own terms, completely wiping away the stigma of his false criminal conviction.

== Cast ==
- Akshay Kumar as Professor Aman Verma
- Preity Zinta as CBI Officer Reet Oberoi
  - Alia Bhatt as younger Reet
- Ashutosh Rana as Lajja Shankar Pandey
- Vishwajeet Pradhan as CBI officer, Reet's boss
- Aman Verma as Amit Shandilya
- Rajesh Parasher as Jassi
- Madan Jain as ACP Pawar
- Ninad Kamat as Sr. Inspector Chopra
- Yash Tonk as Deepak Kumar (Possessed by Lajja Shankar)
- Arif Zakaria as Kaza Muhammad Aftab (Possessed by Lajja Shankar)
- Naushad Abbas as Cop who came to Beat Aman in College

== Music ==
The soundtrack was composed by Jatin–Lalit with lyrics authored by Sameer:

| # | Title | Singer(s) | Length |
|---|---|---|---|
| 1 | "Dil Ka Qaraar" | Sonu Nigam & Shraddha Pandit | 05:27 |
| 2 | "Naaraz Savera Hai" | Kumar Sanu | 05:07 |
| 3 | "Manzil Na Koi" | Remo Fernandes & Jaspinder Narula | 05:26 |
| 4 | "Mujhe Raat Din Bas" | Sonu Nigam | 05:11 |
| 5 | "Nazdeek Savera Hai" | Kumar Sanu | 02:16 |
| 6 | "Manzil Na Koi" (Male) | Remo Fernandes | 05:24 |
| 7 | "Hum Badi Door Chale Aaye" | Shraddha Pandit & Sonu Nigam | 04:35 |

== Reception ==
Bella Jaisinghani of The Indian Express wrote, "This crime thriller is value for money," noting the performances: "Akshay Kumar and Preity Zinta have done an impressive job as a criminal and a CBI officer". R. Vasudevan of Hindustan Times noted the performances, believing it could be Kumar's turning point and mentioning Zinta for playing a role "different from the typical Bollywood heroine who is just an appendage of the hero." Rediff.com's reviewer Sharmila Taliculam gave the film a positive review, but concluded, "Sangharsh may or may not do well at the turnstiles. If you are a Mahesh Bhatt fan, you may find it watchable. If you are not, give it a miss." India Today critic Madhu Jain highly praised the film's performance, noting Kumar for delivering "quite a performance", Zinta for bringing "intelligence to her role", and Rana for a performance that "remains searingly etched on the mind". An article published by The Tribune at the time of release hailed Zinta's performance as "an amazing act", calling Sangharsh "an intense film". Mukhtar Anjoom of Deccan Herald wrote a positive review, noting that in spite of its possible lack of originality, "the treatment of the characters is first-rate" and "the build-up to the impending scare is brilliant". He further described Rana's performance as "outstanding" and praised Chandra for "bringing out the best" out of Kumar and Zinta.

In 2013, Subhash K. Jha described it as one of the "rare ones in which top actors … agreed to play secondary roles" to the leading lady.

== Awards ==
- Filmfare Award for Best Performance in a Negative Role – Ashutosh Rana
- Zee Cine Award for Best Performance in a Negative Role – Ashutosh Rana
