= Yeh Raaste Hain Pyaar Ke =

2001 Indian film by Deepak Shivdasani

- Theatrical release poster
- Directed by: Deepak Shivdasani
- Screenplay by: Robin Bhatt; Akash Khurana
- Dialogues by: Kader Khan
- Story by: Deepak Shivadasani
- Produced by: Deepak Shivdasani; Pradeep Sadarangani
- Starring: Ajay Devgn; Preity Zinta; Madhuri Dixit; Sunny Deol (special appearance)
- Cinematography: Rajan Kinagi
- Edited by: Shirish Kunder
- Music by: Sanjeev Darshan
- Production companies: Tips Industries; Goldmines Telefilms
- Release date: 10 August 2001
- Running time: 159 minutes
- Country: India
- Language: Hindi
- Budget: ₹85 million
- Box office: ₹156.9 million

Yeh Raaste Hain Pyaar Ke (English: These Are The Paths of Love) is a 2001 Indian Hindi-language romantic drama film directed by Deepak Shivdasani. It stars Ajay Devgn, Preity Zinta and Madhuri Dixit, along with Sunny Deol in a special appearance.

Yeh Raaste Hai Pyaar Ke was released on 10 August 2001, directly clashing with another Preity Zinta film Dil Chahta Hai, which was Farhan Akhtar's directorial debut. The film received mixed-to-negative reviews from critics and was a box-office failure.

== Plot ==
Two con artists and car thieves, Vicky (Ajay Devgn) and Sakshi (Preity Zinta), are faced with death when they accidentally kill Bhanwarlal's (Deep Dhillon) brother. Bhanwarlal and his other brother swear to avenge the death of their brother and mistakenly kill Rohit Verma (Ajay Devgn), who is a lookalike of Vicky.

The mistaken identity causes Sakshi to think that Vicky is dead, and she is devastated. Meanwhile, unknown to Sakshi and Bhanwarlal, Vicky is alive and reaches Manali, where he is constantly confused for Rohit. On discovering Rohit's wealth, Vicky realizes that he has hit the jackpot and decides to play along. Soon Rohit's father, Pratap Verma (Vikram Gokhale), arrives home to find Vicky in his bed.

Vicky tries to trick Pratap Verma, but he already knows that Rohit is dead. He convinces Vicky to pose as Rohit for the sake of his daughter-in-law, Neha (Madhuri Dixit), who is in denial/shock to the fact that her husband died on the same day that they got married. He agrees to do the job for money. However, halfway through the job, he decides to grab the money and returns to Sakshi. They are about to forget all about Rohit and start a life of their own when Vicky discovers that he is responsible for Rohit's death since Bhanwarlal meant to kill him and not Rohit. He realizes the debt he owes to Rohit and decides to return, leaving Sakshi once again.

Meanwhile, Sakshi's uncle and aunt try to have her marry Bhanwarlal's youngest brother. She runs away to Manali to be with Vicky. Vicky, at this point, can't tell Neha the truth and so tells Sakshi that he can't be with her. Soon, with the arrival of Bhanwarlal and Sakshi's aunt and uncle, the truth unravels. Finally, Neha realizes that her husband is actually dead, and she accepts the reality. Vicky and Sakshi get back together. It is implied that Neha finds happiness again and starts a new life with her childhood buddy, Sagar (Sunny Deol), who loved her from the beginning.

== Cast ==
- Ajay Devgan in a dual role as
  - Rohit Verma, Neha's late husband
  - Vicky, Sakshi's boyfriend
- Madhuri Dixit as Neha Verma, Rohit's widow, Sagar's childhood friend, later life partner
- Preity Zinta as Sakshi, Vicky's girlfriend
- Kiran Kumar as Ranjan Sharma, Neha's father
- Vikram Gokhale as Pratap Verma, Rohit's father
- Deep Dhillon as Bhanwarlal
- Smita Jaykar as Aarti Sharma, Neha's mother
- Rajeev Verma as Dr. Ashok, Pratap's friend
- Shammi as Rekha Verma, Rohit's grandmother
- Lalit Tiwari as Ashok Sharma
- Asha Sharma as Sarla
- Jayshree T. as Sonia, Neha's aunt
- Mayur as Vikram as Bhanwarlal's brother
- Brij Gopal as Lalit
- Madan Jain as Avinash
- Sunny Deol (special appearance) as Sagar, Neha's childhood friend, later life partner
- Tiku Talsania (special appearance) as Kishanchand Bhagwandas Chellaramani

== Reception ==
Gautam Buragohain of Filmfare wrote that the film "fails to make an impact", although he noted the performances of the three leads, particularly that of Dixit.

== Soundtrack ==
Yeh Raaste Hain Pyaar Ke

Soundtrack album by Sanjeev–Darshan and Adnan Sami
- Released: 1998
- Genre: Feature film soundtrack
- Label: Tips Music

#	Title	Singer(s)
1	"Mera Dil Ek Khali Kamra"	Kumar Sanu, Anuradha Paudwal
2	"Jo Pyaar Karta Hai"	Anuradha Paudwal, Kavita Krishnamurthy, Manohar Shetty
3	"Yeh Raaste Hain Pyaar Ke"	Shaan, Jaspinder Narula
4	"Aaja Aaja" (by Adnan Sami)	Asha Bhosle
5	"Bam Bhole"	Vinod Rathod, Alka Yagnik
6	"Yeh Dil Mohabbat Mein"	Udit Narayan, Alka Yagnik
7	"Halle Halle"	Vinod Rathod, Alka Yagnik
8	"Khoya Khoya Chand Hai"	Udit Narayan
