= Bharat Shah =

Indian businessman (born 1944)

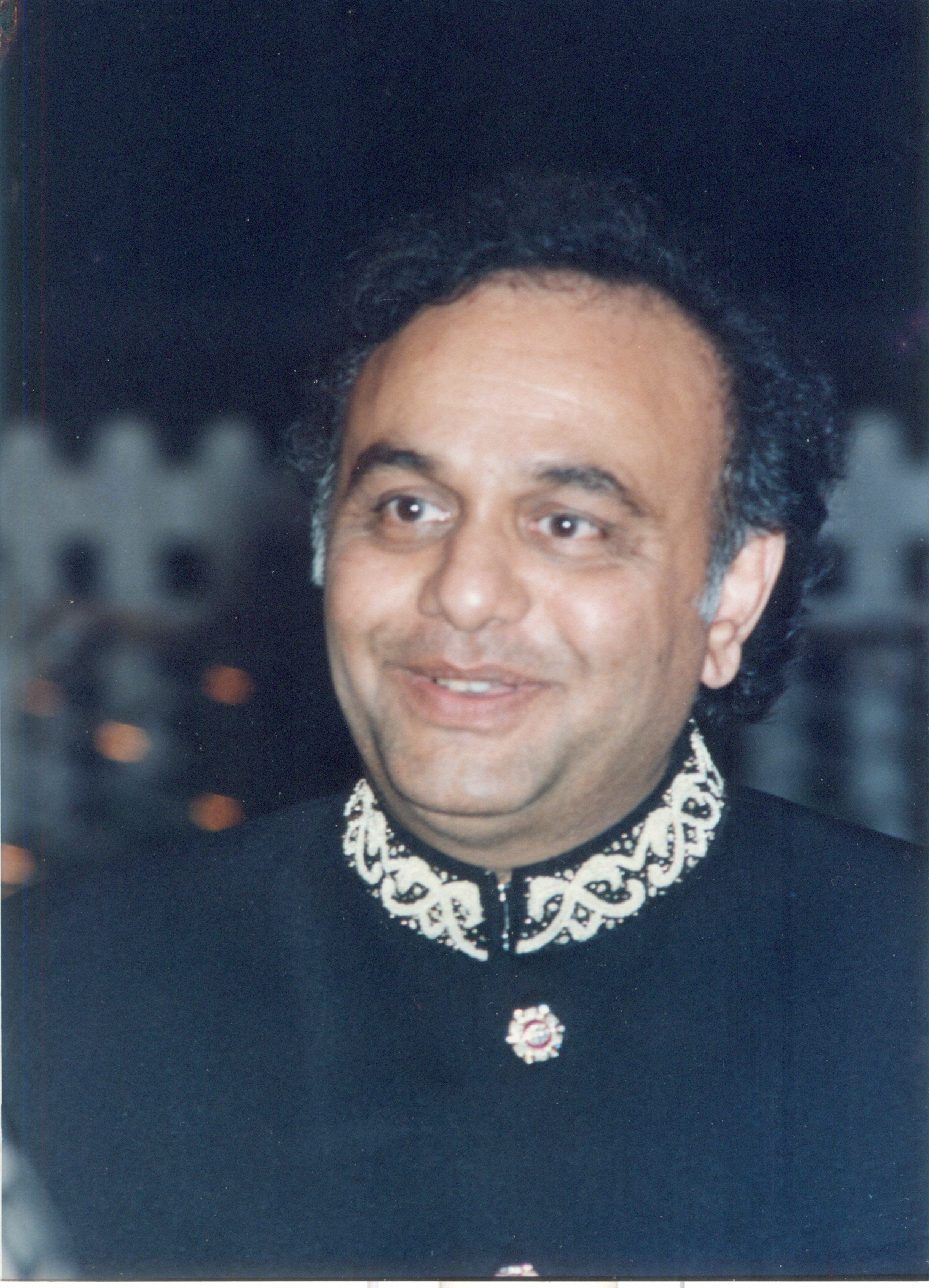
- Born: 5 August 1944 (age 81)
- Occupation: Industrialist
- Years active: 1970–present
- Website: bharatshah.in

Bharat Shah (born 5 August 1944) is an Indian businessman, diamond merchant, film financer and film distributor who primarily works in Hindi films, under his banner VIP Films. He has produced several Bollywood films, such as Dil Se.. (1998) starring Shah Rukh Khan and Manisha Koirala, Devdas (2002) starring Khan, Madhuri Dixit and Aishwarya Rai, and Rascals (2011) starring Sanjay Dutt, Ajay Devgn and Kangana Ranaut.

== Filmography ==
Year	Title	Director(s)	Genre	Producer
1993	Darr	Yash Chopra	Drama, Romance, Thriller	Associate Producer as Bharat Shah
1997	Yes Boss	Aziz Mirza	Drama, Romance	Associate Producer as Bharat Shah
1998	Dil Se..	Mani Ratnam	Romance, Thriller	Co-Producer as Bharat Shah
2000	Pukar	Rajkumar Santoshi	Action, Drama, Romance	Co-Producer as Bharat Shah
2002	Devdas	Sanjay Leela Bhansali	Romance	Producer as Bharat Shah
2008	The Ode (English)	Nilanjan Neil Lahiri	Drama	Executive producer as Bharat Shah
2009	Teree Sang	Satish Kaushik	Romance	Producer as Bharat Shah
2011	Rascals	David Dhawan	Comedy	Co-Producer as Bharat Shah
2012	Ghost	Puja Bedi	Horror	Executive producer as Bharat Shah

== Legal affairs ==
In 2001, Shah was arrested following an investigation into whether a film he financed, Chori Chori Chupke Chupke, was funded by the Indian mafia. This arrest led to a conviction in 2003 for not disclosing fellow producer, Nazim Rizwi's links to the Indian mafia. Rizwi and his assistant, Abdul Rahim Allahbaksh Khan, were also convicted of forging links with the Indian mafia to extort film personalities. Shah was sentenced to one year in jail but as he had already spent fourteen months in jail as part of his trial, he was freed. Rizwi and Khan each were sentenced to six years' rigorous imprisonment and a fine of ₹ 15 lakhs.
