= Guinness World Records (Indian TV series) =

Indian reality TV show

- Genre: Reality
- Presented by: Preity Zinta, Shabbir Ahluwalia
- Country of origin: India
- Original language: English

Production
- Producer: Niret Alva
- Camera setup: Multi-camera
- Running time: 60 minutes

Original release
- Network: Colors TV
- Release: 19 March – 17 May 2011

Guinness World Records is an Indian English-language reality TV show based on the Guinness Book of World Records. The show, which was hosted by Preity Zinta and Shabbir Ahluwalia, premiered on 18 March 2011 to an audience measurement of 3.3 rating points. Each episode presents different individuals trying to break official world records.

== Format ==
The format of the show is similar to that of previous TV shows based on the book of world records. The show's initial goal was to break over 70 Guinness World Records. Kristian Teufel, an official Guinness World Records adjudicator, is present on stage while every participant attempts to break a record and constitutes the final authority on the record, being the one who analyses the performance and announces the results.
