= Soldier (1998 Indian film) =

- Film poster
- Directed by: Abbas–Mustan
- Screenplay by: Sachin Bhowmick; Shyam Goel
- Story by: Shyam Goel
- Produced by: Kumar S. Taurani; Ramesh Taurani
- Starring: Bobby Deol; Preity Zinta; Raakhee
- Cinematography: Thomas A. Xavier
- Edited by: Hussain A. Burmawala
- Music by: Songs: Anu Malik; Background Score: Surinder Sodhi
- Production company: Tips Industries
- Distributed by: Tips Industries; Eros Entertainment
- Release date: 20 November 1998
- Running time: 155 minutes
- Country: India
- Language: Hindi
- Budget: ₹8.25 crore
- Box office: ₹38.88 crore

Soldier is a 1998 Indian Hindi-language action thriller film directed by Abbas–Mustan, written by Sachin Bhowmick and Shyam Goel and produced by Tips Industries. The film stars Bobby Deol and Preity Zinta, alongside Rakhee Gulzar, Farida Jalal, Suresh Oberoi, Dalip Tahil, Sharat Saxena, Salim Ghouse and Ashish Vidyarthi in supporting roles.

Soldier was released on 20 November 1998 and was a blockbuster. It became the second highest-grossing film of the year of Bollywood of India after Kuch Kuch Hota Hai. At the 44th Filmfare Awards, Soldier received 5 nominations, including Best Director (Abbas–Mustan) and Best Supporting Actress (Raakhee), and won 2 awards, including Best Female Debut (Zinta, also for Dil Se..).

The film was remade in Dhallywood as Jamin Nai in 2000 and Tamil as Villu in 2009.

== Plot ==
In Barmer, 1978, corrupt Indian Army low ranked soldiers Pratap Singh, Virender Sinha, Jaswant Dalal along with Virender's civilian brother Baldev have been stealing arms and ammunition led by a mysterious man known only as DK. Major Vijay Malhotra, a competent and high-ranking soldier, catches them in the act but is murdered by DK.

20 years later, the Mumbai Police get a fax from the Australian Interpol branch regarding Jaswant, now a wanted illegal arms supplier. An operation to capture him is handed over to ACP Dinesh Kapoor, an old friend of the late Major Vijay Malhotra, who informs a mysterious man known as Vicky. He wants Vicky to intercept Jaswant and not let the police capture him. Vicky succeeds but when Jaswant tries to kill him, Vicky shoots him.

Vicky travels to Sydney using information from Dinesh and woos Pratap Singh's daughter, Preeti. After all these years, Pratap, Virender, and Baldev have become high-profile arms dealers and live in Australia. After hearing of Jaswant's death and DK's involvement, they worry about betrayal from one another as each of them has secret files that incriminate the entire group.

Vicky meets with Pratap, who identifies him as Jaswant's killer and proposes a way to help make him more powerful. Baldev and his son Jojo realize that Vicky's mother is none other than Virender's wife, Shanti. Hence, it appears that Vicky is actually Virendra's son who has travelled to Sydney to meet his father. Vicky is welcomed into Virender's gang. Virender is ecstatic to reunite with his son and happier to learn that he is in love with Pratap's daughter. He wants to use this to his advantage and have Vicky retrieve Pratap's secret file. Vicky instead surprisingly shoots his father dead and retrieves his secret file, with which he discovers who DK actually is. Vicky convinces Baldev that Pratap betrayed them (by putting his lighter on the crime scene where he killed Virendra) and killed Virender. Baldev in revenge rallies all his henchmen to launch an attack on Pratap but they are killed by Pratap's men. It is revealed that Vicky was working with Pratap to eliminate Virender's gang.

Vicky then reveals to Pratap that he is not actually Virender's son. He used Shanti to get closer to Virender and did the same for Pratap by using Preeti. The reason for all this is because DK gave him a contract to kill not just Jaswant but all the other partners so that he can own 100% of their crime organization. Vicky says that because of Preeti, he will instead kill DK and make Pratap the king. Pratap agrees to go to India with Vicky to kill DK.

Meanwhile, a shocked Preeti overhears this and tearfully reveals it to Shanti. Shanti acknowledges that Vicky is not her son and that she was helping Vicky to kill her husband and his business partners, whose weapons had accidentally killed her own son, unbeknownst to Virender. She reveals that Vicky is actually Raj "Raju", the son of the late Major Vijay Malhotra. After Vijay's death, he had been framed for the gang's crimes and labeled a traitor. He was stripped of all medals, and their community ostracized his wife, Geeta, and son Raju. The villagers prevented Vijay's body from being cremated and threw it in the desert, where it became lost in a sandstorm. Raju separated from his mother, who stayed at a temple while he was raised by Shanti. Raju had been seeking revenge and justice for his father, and upon learning everything, Preeti agrees to assist him.

Dinesh releases Jaswant, who is revealed to be alive and had been helping Raju to finish off Virender's gang through his information about the gangster. Enraged, Raju arrives in Barmer with Pratap and takes him to his mother at the temple. He reveals to a shocked Pratap that he is Vijay Malhotra's son. DK is revealed to be none other than Jaswant in disguise. Jaswant's henchmen initially overpower Raju and Dinesh. A sandstorm ensues and gives Raju an advantage to kill the henchmen and severely injuring Pratap and Jaswant. Pratap and Jaswant confess their crimes to the villagers brought by Shanthi and Preeti. The two are then left to be eaten alive by vultures. With his name cleared, Major Vijay Malhotra is declared a martyr and given an honourable memorial ceremony.

== Cast ==
- Bobby Deol as Raj "Raju" Malhotra / Vicky Sinha Major vijay malhotra’s son
- Preity Zinta as Preeti Singh (Hindi voice dubbed by Mona Ghosh Shetty)
- Raakhee Gulzar as Geeta Malhotra, Raju's mother.
- Farida Jalal as Shanti Sinha
- Johnny Lever as Mohan / (Indian Army Service Corps)/(IASC) officer Sohan Singh (dual role)
- Suresh Oberoi as Subedar Pratap Singh (IASC)/(Indian Army Service Corps), Preeti's father.
- Dalip Tahil as Naib Subedar Virender Sinha, (IASC)/(Indian Army Service Corps)
- Sharat Saxena as Baldev Sinha, Virender's younger brother.
- Ashish Vidyarthi as Asst Commissioner of Police Dinesh Kapoor
- Salim Ghouse as Havildar Jaswant Dalal, (IASC) / DK
- Sheetal Suvarna as Sheetal
- Jeetu Verma as Jojo Sinha, Baldev's son
- Kulbhushan Kharbanda as Police Commissioner
- Pankaj Dheer as Major Vijay Malhotra, (Indian Army Service Corps)/(IASC), Raju's father major saab Major Sahab
- Amrit Patel as Hotel manager
- Pranav Bajpai as Baaldaar
- Narendra Bedi as Taxi Driver
- Vivek Vaswani as a College principal

== Soundtrack ==
Soldier

Soundtrack album by Anu Malik
- Released: 1998
- Genre: Feature film soundtrack
- Length: 47:43
- Label: Tips Industries

The soundtrack was composed by Anu Malik and was a hit amongst the audience. It was a key point in the success of the film. The songs "Tera Rang Bale Bale", "Soldier Soldier", "Hum To Dil Chahen", "Mere Dil Jigar Se" and "Mere Khwabon Mein Jo Aye" were chartbusters and the album was the third best-selling album of 1998 after Kuch Kuch Hota Hai and Dil Se... Lyrics were penned by Sameer. The song "Mere Khwabon Mein Jo Aaye" is occasionally confused with a song of the same name from Dilwale Dulhania Le Jayenge (1995).

#	Title	Singer(s)	Length
1.	"Soldier Soldier Meethi Baaten"	Kumar Sanu & Alka Yagnik	06:13
2.	"Mere Khwabon Mein Jo Aaye"	Alka Yagnik	04:23
3.	"Mere Dil Jigar Se Guzri Hai"	Kumar Sanu & Alka Yagnik	05:32
4.	"Hum Toh Dil Chaahe Tumhara"	Kumar Sanu & Hema Sardesai	05:18
5.	"Mehfil Mein Baar Baar"	Kumar Sanu & Alka Yagnik	05:40
6.	"Tera Rang Balle Balle"	Sonu Nigam & Jaspinder Narula	04:50
7.	"Meri Saanson Mein Samaye"	Sonu Nigam	04:23
8.	"Theme of Soldier"	(Instrumental)	04:47
9.	"Soldier Soldier"	(Instrumental)	06:20

== Reception ==
Khalid Mohamed gave Soldier 2 out of 5 stars, writing that it "leaves you feeling ever so much older and colder." Madhur Mittal of The Tribune said that it "boasts of terrific production and technical values", calling it a "a taut thriller".

== Awards ==
44th Filmfare Awards:

Winners

- Best Female Debut – Preity Zinta (also for Dil Se..)
- Best Action – Late Akbar Bakshi

Nominees

- Best Director – Abbas–Mustan
- Best Supporting Actress – Raakhee
- Best Music Director – Anu Malik
