= Chori Chori Chupke Chupke =

2001 Indian film by Abbas–Mustan

- Theatrical release poster
- Directed by: Abbas–Mustan
- Screenplay by: Shyam Goel
- Dialogues by: Javed Siddiqui
- Story by: Neeraj Vora
- Produced by: Nazim Rizvi
- Starring: Salman Khan; Rani Mukerji; Preity Zinta
- Cinematography: Thomas A. Xavier
- Edited by: Hussain A. Burmawala
- Music by: Songs: Anu Malik; Score: Surendra Sodhi
- Production company: Emaar Films International
- Distributed by: Eros International
- Release date: 9 March 2001
- Running time: 165 minutes
- Country: India
- Language: Hindi
- Budget: ₹13 crore
- Box office: ₹37.5 crore (equivalent to ₹149 crore or US$16 million in 2023)

Chori Chori Chupke Chupke (transl. Secretly and Stealthily) is a 2001 Indian Hindi-language romantic drama film directed by Abbas–Mustan, with screenplay and story from Shyam Goel and Neeraj Vora respectively. Starring Salman Khan, Rani Mukerji and Preity Zinta in lead roles, the film's music is composed by Anu Malik and lyrics are penned by Sameer. Telling the story of a married couple hiring a young prostitute as a surrogate mother, the film generated controversy during its release for dealing with the taboo issue of surrogate childbirth in India.

Initially set to release on 22 December 2000, Chori Chori Chupke Chupke's release was delayed for several months when producer Nazim Rizvi and financier Bharat Shah were arrested and the Central Bureau of Investigation seized the film's prints on the suspicion that the production had been funded by Chhota Shakeel of the Mumbai underworld. The film was released in March 2001 to a wide audience and emerged as a commercial success, becoming the sixth highest-grossing film of 2001 in India.

Critical praise was majorly directed towards Zinta's performance as a prostitute-turned-surrogate mother, earning her a Best Supporting Actress nomination at the 47th Filmfare Awards, the only nomination for the film. The film has often been associated with surrogacy in Indian popular culture. This film was remade as a television drama series named Dil Se Dil Tak in which Sidharth Shukla portrayed as Raj, Rashami Desai as Priya and Jasmin Bhasin as Madhubala.

== Plot ==
Raj and Priya, who come from well-to-do Indian families, meet at a wedding and fall in love. Soon after they marry, Priya becomes pregnant. Early in the pregnancy, Priya miscarries and becomes permanently infertile. On Dr. Balraj Chopra's advice, they decide to look for a surrogate mother to bear Raj's child and hide Priya's infertility from his conservative family. Since the process of artificial insemination could be revealed in the Indian media due to the family's renown and position in society, the couple agree that pregnancy should be achieved by means of sexual relations between Raj and the surrogate mother. Raj meets Madhubala "Madhu", a prostitute, who agrees to carry Raj's baby in exchange for money. After some much-needed behavioral grooming and a makeover, Madhu meets Priya—who is unaware of Madhu's background—and the three depart for Switzerland in order to carry out their plan secretly.

Soon Madhu is pregnant with Raj's child, and he happily tells his family that Priya is expecting. Meanwhile, Raj's business partner Ajay Sharma begins to sexually harass Madhu and she decides to leave Switzerland, mistakenly believing that Raj told his friend that she is a prostitute. Eventually, Priya finds out about Madhu's past, but still believes that Madhu should carry their child and begs her to stay. When Madhu is at home by herself, Raj's friend assaults her but Raj arrives in time to save her. Overwhelmed by Raj's kindness, Madhu falls in love with him.

Raj's family suddenly arrives in Switzerland. While Priya reaches for pregnancy-simulating pillows, the family meets the heavily pregnant Madhu who is introduced to them as a friend staying with them while her husband is travelling for business. Raj's grandfather Kailashnath and father Ranjit arrange a Godbharaai, a religious baby shower ceremony. They ask Raj, Priya, and Madhu to return with them to India, where the ritual must be held as formally required by tradition.

The ceremony is very important so Priya sends Madhu as herself. An emotional Madhu becomes conflicted about giving up her child. Finding Madhu's room empty and the money dumped on the bed, a frantic Priya pursues her to the train station and slaps Madhu when she confesses that she loves Raj. By the time Raj arrives, Madhu has gone into premature labour. The doctor announces that either Madhu or the child can be saved, and Priya asks him to save Madhu. However, both mother and baby survive. Frustrated, Madhu gives the baby to Priya, who quickly settles into a hospital bed with "her" baby. Dr. Balraj Chopra lies to Raj's family that while Priya gave birth, Madhu's child was stillborn.

When Madhu is ready to leave, she promises Raj that she will not go back to prostitution. When he takes her to the airport, he realizes that she loves him and kisses her forehead. Madhu leaves happily.

== Cast ==
The cast is listed below:

- Salman Khan as Raj Malhotra
- Rani Mukerji as Priya Malhotra
- Preity Zinta as Madhubala Singh "Madhu"
- Farida Jalal as Asha Malhotra
- Dalip Tahil as Ranjit Kumar Malhotra
- Johnny Lever as Pappu Bhai
- Amrish Puri as Kailashnath Malhotra
- Prem Chopra as Dr. Balraj Chopra
- Apara Mehta as a prostitute
- Ruby Bhatia as a news reporter
- Deepti Bhatnagar as a dancer in the song "Mehendi"
- Adi Irani as Ajay Sharma

== Production ==
Director duo Abbas–Mustan had almost completed Ajnabee by October 1999 when they declared Chori Chori Chupke Chupke as their next project. The three leads, Salman Khan, Rani Mukerji, and Preity Zinta, previously starred together in the romantic comedy Har Dil Jo Pyar Karega (2000). Producer Nazim Rizvi clarified that the casting of the three actors happened before they signed for the latter film. Khan, Mukerji and Zinta were paid ₹1.5 crore (US$160,000), ₹0.24 crore (US$25,000), and ₹0.25 crore (US$26,000) for their roles, respectively (all sums unadjusted for inflation). Zinta was initially reluctant to play her role, as she was unsure she was suited to play a prostitute, but she eventually accepted it at the directors' persuasion. To prepare for it, she visited several bars and nightclubs in Mumbai's red-light areas to study the lingo and mannerisms of sex-workers.

Chori Chori Chupke Chupke was made on a budget of ₹13 crore (equivalent to ₹52 crore or US$5.4 million in 2023). Principal photography started in early 2000 and lasted two months. Location filming, performed by Thomas A. Xavier, took place in both Mahabaleshwar and Switzerland. The film was edited by Hussain A. Burmawala, and Surendra Sodhi composed the background score.

Initially, Shah Rukh Khan was offered the lead role as Raj Malhotra, who had previously worked in the directors' two films Baazigar, and Baadshah. However, he declined due to lack of dates, and then Salman Khan was approached and has accepted the offer.

== Themes and influence ==
The film generated some controversy before and during its release for being one of the only Hindi-language films dealing with the taboo issue of surrogate childbirth in India, in addition to prostitution in India. Surrogacy in the film is not achieved through artificial insemination but sexual intercourse, and author Aditya Bharadwaj argued that the film draws an analogy between surrogacy and prostitution. Anindita Majumdar, author of the book Surrogacy (2018), wrote, "In popular Indian culture, surrogacy has come to be associated with the 2001 Hindi language film Chori Chori Chupke Chupke". According to author Daniel Grey, that Madhubala was a prostitute before becoming a surrogate "reinforces a stereotyped and erroneous popular association between the two roles that has contributed to considerable prejudice on the Subcontinent against women who act as surrogates".

According to The Hindu, some of film's scenes were said to have been borrowed from Pretty Woman (1990) and the storyline inspired by Doosri Dulhan (1983). According to Krämer, the similarities between Pretty Woman and Chori Chori Chupke Chupke are limited to replicated scenes in "merely one plot strand among many", in an otherwise different story. In another book by Majumdar, Transnational Commercial Surrogacy and the (Un)Making of Kin in India (2017), she discusses the similarity between Chori Chori Chupke Chupke and Doosri Dulhan. Majumdar describes the surrogate mothers as "fallen women" who are first portrayed as aberrant women with no interest in motherhood, who gradually develop a sense of maternal instinct during the process of pregnancy.

Anupama Chopra of India Today described Zinta's character of Madhubala as hooker with a heart of gold, as did academic Lucia Krämer. Sociologist Steve Derné wrote in his book Globalization on the Ground: New Media and the Transformation of Culture, Class, and Gender in India that through the character of Madhubala, Chori Chori Chupke Chupke becomes one of the films which portray "excessively sexual, greedy women who are redeemed by being remade as consumers". Derné further credited the film with melding the stereotypical "heroine" and "vamp" roles of Hindi heroines in contrast to how they were portrayed in previous decades, describing Zinta as a "legitimate heroine" in the film. S. Banaji spoke of a "transformation in the 'moral' consciousness of the prostitute". Bhawana Somaaya, while critical of the film's "regular packaging of commercial clichés", commended it for the unique portrayal of the wife, played by Mukerji, who is the sole decision-maker in the family throughout the entire process of surrogacy.

== Soundtrack ==
Chori Chori Chupke Chupke

Soundtrack album by Anu Malik
- Released: 2000
- Genre: Feature film soundtrack
- Length: 51:41
- Label: Universal Music India
- Producer: Anu Malik

The soundtrack for Chori Chori Chupke Chupke was composed by Anu Malik and the lyrics were written by Sameer. It was released in 2000 by Universal Music India. According to the Indian trade website Box Office India, with around two million units sold, the soundtrack became the sixth highest-selling music album of the year.

Chori Chori Chupke Chupke (Soundtrack from the Motion Picture)
No.	Title	Singer(s)	Length
1.	"Chori Chori Chupke Chupke"	Alka Yagnik, Babul Supriyo	7:35
2.	"Dekhne Walon Ne"	Udit Narayan, Alka Yagnik	6:13
3.	"No. 1 Punjabi"	Sonu Nigam, Jaspinder Narula	7:12
4.	"Diwani Diwani"	Anu Malik, Anaida	5:26
5.	"Diwana Hai Yeh Man"	Sonu Nigam, Alka Yagnik	6:58
6.	"Love You Love You Bolo"	Anu Malik, Alka Yagnik	5:59
7.	"Mehandi Mehandi"	Jaspinder Narula	8:57
8.	"Dulhan Ghar Aayi" (Version 1)	Jaspinder Narula	1:41
9.	"Dulhan Ghar Aayi" (Version 2)	Anu Malik	1:40
Total length:			51:41

== Release ==
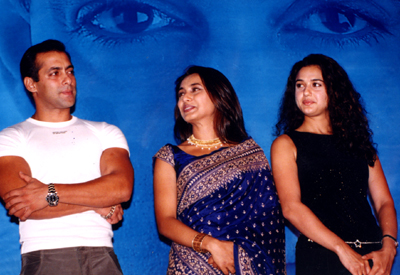
Salman Khan, Rani Mukerji and Preity Zinta (l-r) at the audio release of Chori Chori Chupke Chupke in 2000

The film's initial release date of 22 December 2000 was delayed when producer Nazim Rizvi was arrested in December and film financier Bharat Shah was arrested in January; both were charged with receiving funding from Chhota Shakeel of the Mumbai underworld and pressuring leading Bollywood actors—specifically, Khan—to appear in the film and for the profits to be shared with Shakeel. Rizvi had reportedly been under telephone surveillance by the Mumbai Police for a number of months. The Central Bureau of Investigation seized the film's prints and delivered them to the court receiver. The negatives were released on 12 February 2001 on a judicial order. In its ruling, the court ordered all profits from the film to go to the Maharashtra state government. Rivzi and Shah were still incarcerated when Chori Chori Chupke Chupke opened to the public on 9 March 2001. The film was released with an opening credit thanking the Special Court, MCOCA, the Crime Branch, the Mumbai Police, and the court receiver, "without whose untiring efforts and good office this picture would never have been made".

The film's release took place amid protests due to its alleged funding by the underworld. Due to the controversy surrounding its delayed release—and the recurrent publicity around it—the film was expected to be a big success, with 325 prints sold before release. The director duo held a special screening of the film two days prior to its release for the senior brass of the Mumbai Police, to fulfill a promise made earlier in order to prove that no objectionable content appeared in the film, as could have been projected.

Certified U (suitable for all age groups) by the Central Board of Film Certification, Chori Chori Chupke Chupke opened to a wide audience and emerged a commercial success and one of the highest-grossing films of 2001. Still, despite a strong opening, the film gradually lost public interest; it eventually grossed ₹31 crore (US$3.2 million) against its ₹13 crore (US$1.3 million) budget, with additional $1.4 million earned overseas, leaving its worldwide gross in 2001 at ₹37.51 crore (equivalent to ₹149 crore or US$16 million in 2023). Box Office India concluded the film's final commercial performance with the verdict "semi hit".

== Reception ==
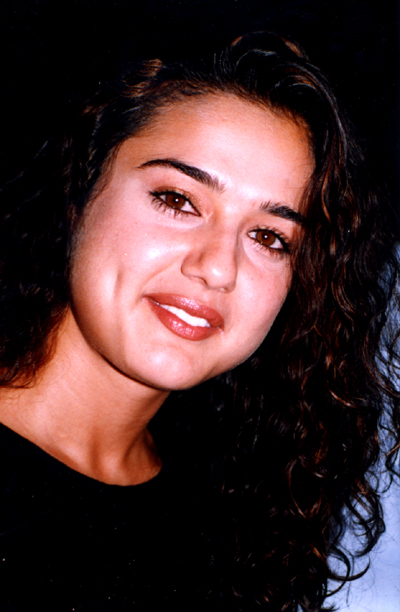
Critics particularly praised Zinta's performance as Madhubala

Critics praised the uniqueness of the film for dealing with the rarely-touched subject of surrogacy, but disliked the execution. Preity Zinta's performance, in what was seen as an unconventional role, was especially noted by a number of critics, with high praise for her portrayal of the gradual change her character goes through over the course of the story. Film critic Sukanya Verma, who was left with "mixed emotions" after seeing the film, noted Zinta's role as "the meatiest part of all", finding her transformation throughout the film "amazingly believable". Padmaraj Nair of Screen called Zinta the film's "real scene-stealer" for having delivered "a stunning performance". Vinayak Chakravorty of Hindustan Times hailed Zinta's "admirable zest" as the "trumpcard of the film". Dinesh Raheja of India Today credited Zinta with giving the film "its electric charge". Likewise, Nikhat Kazmi of The Times of India noted Zinta for keeping "the adrenalin gushing" and wrote of "riveting moments" where she "shows flashes of a fine performance". Ziya Us Salam of The Hindu, though similarly fond of Zinta for putting "life into her character of Madhubala", found the actress less convincing in "mouthing the inanities used by the women of the street". M. Shamim, writing for the same publication, believed Zinta had "put her body and soul into the streetwalker's flaming-red dress".

The duo of Salman Khan and Rani Mukerji faced some criticism from Sukanya Verma, who lamented their underdeveloped roles. She considered Mukerji to be "handicapped with a role that doesn't give her much scope besides weeping and sobbing" and stated that Khan's performance lacked substance. Raheja described Khan as "overtly subdued" as opposed to his recent comic roles, but wrote of Mukerji, "The emotions that drive Rani Mukherji's character are not given either a layered detailing or an adequate exposition so she comes across as pale as the pastel-coloured dresses she favours". Chakravorty similarly noted Khan for playing against type. Kazmi similarly disliked their characters in contrast to Zinta's: "From a street-walker to sensitive young girl and then a jealous lover - stray vignettes of flesh and blood form from Preity which come as a respite in a terrain dominated by an ever-say-cheese and forever understanding Rani and an unruffled, mumbling Salman who plays the perfect gentleman with the zeal of a zombie." Padmaraj Nair, however, praised the actors in addition to Zinta, noting Khan for his "understated" performance, and arguing that Mukerji is "at her best".

Chori Chori Chupke Chupke was reviewed positively by a number of critics. Taran Adarsh from the entertainment portal Bollywood Hungama was positive of the film, concluding it "lives up to the towering expectations thanks to the solid drama". Several reviewers appreciated the film for its portrayal of the big family and its overall positive atmosphere, including Kazmi, who found it to be a "modern ode to the ancient Indian family" and admired its "overwhelming feel-goodness". Likewise, Us Salam noted the film's "loads of good music, beautiful locales, sweet smiles and lovely feel", and Shamim shared similar sentiments, appreciating the directors for not allowing "any moral issue to cloud the narrative" and filling "the screen with mesmerising charm and beauty of the lifestyle of a well-knit family".

Less positive views were expressed in relation to the film's stereotypical approach and poor execution of the story. Verma found the presentation of the story to be "absurd". Nair was ambivalent towards the film in this regard: "On the one hand, the film stands by family values and desi culture while, on the other, it goes in for cheap gimmicks like hiring a cabaret dancer as a solution for bearing a child just to lure the front benchers and the masses". Still, he ultimately noted an "engrossing" second half and commended the directors for having "done their best to bring a fair amount of conviction while putting it across on the screen".

Vinayak Chakravorty, who gave the film a three-star rating, noted its resemblance to Doosri Dulhan and criticised it for occasionally coming across as "a veritable rerun of the stereotypes". Raheja was critical of the film's lack of subtlety but believed the directors are "masters of pace and don't allow your attention to wander". Suman Tarafdar of Filmfare was particularly critical of the film, calling it "saccarine" and "a film for anyone gullible enough to believe in fairy lands", and noting that Zinta gave "the only slightly noteworthy performance".

== Accolades ==
Khan was named the Most Sensational Actor at the Bollywood Movie Awards. At the 47th Filmfare Awards, Zinta was nominated in the Best Supporting Actress category, the only nomination for the film.

== Legacy ==
Chori Chori Chupke Chupke has often been associated with surrogacy in Indian popular culture. It has been screened at a number of events since its release. In 2002, it was one of 30 films screened at a three-month-long Bollywood event organised by the Swiss Government in Zürich. It was later screened at the 2005 Independent South Asian Film Festival and the 2012 Fiji Film Festival.

Zinta's role has been noted as one of her notable works. In a column about Zinta, published in an August 2001 issue of Screen magazine, Roshmila Bhattacharya asserted, "If Chori Chori Chupke Chupke found a following in conventional circles, it's thanks to Preity’s handling of yet another 'brave' role". In a 2003 column for Sify about the portrayal of sex-workers in Hindi films, Subhash K. Jha wrote of Zinta that in spite of being "uncomfortable about using all the foul language ... Once she entered the zone of the rented womb Preity had a ball. This remains her best performance yet". Published in the same year, a column analysing Zinta's career by Stardust found her to be "manifested [her]self most prominently ... in [the film]", adding, "Here was Preity essaying a character with tremendous scope for performance, but the scenes in which she excelled was when she did her bubbly act in the initial stages of the film".
