= Armaan (2003 film) =

2003 film by Honey Irani

- Theatrical release poster
- Directed by: Honey Irani
- Screenplay by: Javed Akhtar; Honey Irani
- Story by: Honey Irani
- Produced by: Dinesh Gandhi
- Starring: Amitabh Bachchan; Anil Kapoor; Preity Zinta; Gracy Singh; Randhir Kapoor
- Cinematography: Ravi Varman
- Edited by: Shirish Kunder
- Music by: Songs: Shankar–Ehsaan–Loy; Score: Raju Singh
- Production company: Aarti Enterprises
- Distributed by: Eros Entertainment
- Release date: 16 May 2003
- Running time: 159 minutes
- Country: India
- Language: Hindi
- Budget: ₹100 million
- Box office: ₹149.2 million

Armaan (transl. Desire) is a 2003 Indian Hindi-language medical drama film co-written and directed by Honey Irani. It stars an ensemble cast of Amitabh Bachchan, Anil Kapoor, Preity Zinta, Gracy Singh, and Randhir Kapoor. The film is set in a hospital and follows the travails of its principal, Dr. Akash (Anil Kapoor), to sustain the institution financially. Meanwhile, a mentally unstable woman named Sonia (Zinta) comes into his life and offers to help by donating to the hospital on the condition that Akash marries her.

Irani wrote the story of Armaan and also wrote the screenplay with Javed Akhtar. Principal photography (handled by Ravi Varman) took place in India and Africa, and Shirish Kunder edited the film. It was released on 16 May 2003 and declared a commercial failure, only earning ₹149.2 million (US$1.6 million) against a ₹100 million (US$1.1 million) budget. Although the film garnered mixed reviews, critics praised Irani's direction and the actors' performances, particularly those of Bachchan and Zinta. Zinta received nominations for her performance as the film's antagonist at the Filmfare Awards, the Producers Guild Film Awards, and the Screen Awards.

== Plot ==
In a hospital founded by Dr. Siddharth Sinha, he and his adopted son, Akash, work as doctors. Siddharth wishes to run a state-of-the-art hospital, but his profession requires him to dedicate his time to his patients. Soon, a new doctor, Dr. Neha Mathur, joins the hospital and falls for Akash. However, the arrival of Sonia Kapoor later changes the relationship between Akash and Neha. Sonia is a jealous, spoilt woman who is used to having things her way, and it is not long before she wants Akash for herself. She decides that since Akash is the man for her, she can win his love with a financial agreement. The agreement states that once Akash marries Sonia, her father Gulshan Kapoor will help finance the hospital.

Siddharth dies in an attempt to bring an injured child to the hospital after suffering a heart attack. His last wish is for the hospital to be properly completed. Akash, now burdened with the increasing debts to purchase equipment for the hospital, cannot arrange for further funds. With a broken heart, he agrees to marry Sonia to set up the hospital, thus fulfilling his father's final wish. Neha understands his dilemma and agrees to break up with Akash, but because of her dedication and professionalism, she offers to continue working in the same hospital.

After the marriage, Sonia is revealed to be highly manipulative, consistently jealous and mistrustful, and obsessively controlling towards Akash. She begins to suspect that Akash is having an affair with Neha, and starts annoying both of them. She cannot stand Neha, who is still working at the hospital, and keeps coming up with all kinds of excuses to get her out. She is involved in a serious accident and has severe brain damage requiring Akash to operate on her. For a moment, he is in a dilemma—curing Sonia would mean again having to face the problems she causes. However, he decides to fulfill his duty as a doctor and Sonia later recovers. She learns that Akash operated on her, despite her behaviour. Sonia asks for Akash's forgiveness and divorces him, allowing him to marry and settle down with Neha.

== Cast ==
Credits adapted from Box Office India:

- Amitabh Bachchan as Dr. Siddharth Sinha
- Anil Kapoor as Dr. Akash Sinha
- Preity Zinta as Sonia Sinha
- Gracy Singh as Dr. Neha Mathur
- Randhir Kapoor as Gulshan Kapoor
- Aamir Bashir as Dr. Sanjay

== Production ==
In April 2002, the entertainment website Rediff.com reported that Honey Irani would make her debut as the director of a then-untitled film. Having written stories and screenplays for many films, she said she had long aspired for a project she could direct. She wanted to feel how directors executed their ideas by themselves with no intervention from others. She spoke of her experiment with her first self-directed film: "It is a great feeling to create a film from the story you have written. It is all about words taking shape in the form of visuals. I just love it ... it is wonderful. I am enjoying it immensely." According to Irani, she had planned to work on a medical drama—which was later titled Armaan (transl. Desire)—to explore peoples' innermost desires and relationships. Iran wrote the screenplay with her ex-husband and then-close friend Javed Akhtar, who also wrote the film's dialogues and lyrics, and completed it later that year in September.

Irani's daughter, Zoya Akhtar, handled the casting for Armaan. When the screenplay was finished, it was announced that Bachchan, Anil Kapoor, Singh, Zinta, and Randhir Kapoor had been chosen for the leads. This marked the first time Amitabh Bachchan and Anil Kapoor had been in a film with a female director. Playing the role of a doctor for the first time, Anil Kapoor admitted the film had given him chances to do many things. Bachchan, the first actor Irani wanted to cast since the film was conceived, played his father; it is also the first film to feature Anil Kapoor and Bachchan in a scene together. In an interview with journalist Subhash K. Jha of Rediff.com, she confessed it was her dream to work with Bachchan—who immediately agreed after she had offered him the part—adding it was modelled after his personality. Bachchan himself has spoken of his excitement after learning the venture was to be directed by a woman. It was originally intended that Tabu would play the role of Dr. Neha Mathur. But Irani later replaced her with Gracy Singh, whose performance in the sports film Lagaan (2001) attracted Irani to meet her and offer her the role. Irani believed that Singh's role as a doctor made her less glamorous.

Preity Zinta plays Sonia, the first time she has played an antagonist. Describing herself as an honest and outspoken person, Zinta liked the role, particularly for its "insane" character, because it allowed her to "vent ... all [of her] frustrations". Calling it the best role of her acting career, she commented: "If Sonia didn't like something, she would show it in a sneaky way. I loved the freedom of saying anything I wanted to and not worrying about what the other person would think." In an interview published by Filmfare in their September 2003 issue, talking about her acting career and on-screen image, Zinta added she took part solely to put an end to her "cute-and-bubbly" image, which she disliked. Before it was offered to her, several actresses were asked to take the part, including Tabu, Rani Mukerji, and Aishwarya Rai. Randhir Kapoor played Zinta's father, the businessman Gulshan. This was his first feature since Mother (1999) was released. Hrithik Roshan was reported to make a cameo appearance.

Irani revealed her colleagues called her a "trendsetter" as she was the first female director at the time to direct a big-budget Bollywood film; the total production cost of Armaan was ₹100 million (equivalent to ₹400 million or US$4.3 million in 2026). Ravi Varman worked as the cinematographer, while Yunnus Pathan and Kiran Khanna completed the production design. As the film's main set is a hospital, soft contrast and diffused lighting were required. The choreographers were Farah Khan, Geeta Kapoor, and Saroj Khan, and Kaushal–Moses handled the action direction. The film was shot in Mumbai, Mussoorie, Mauritius, and Sun City in 82 to 92 days. After filming ended in late 2002, Shirish Kunder edited the film, using sync sound; Raju Singh composed its background score. Dinesh Gandhi of Aarti Enterprises produced the film, which was distributed by Eros Entertainment.

== Soundtrack ==
Armaan

Soundtrack album by Shankar–Ehsaan–Loy
- Released: 22 March 2003
- Genre: Feature-film soundtrack
- Length: 42:23
- Label: T-Series
- Producer: Shankar–Ehsaan–Loy

Shankar–Ehsaan–Loy chronology
Ek Aur Ek Gyarah (2003)	Armaan (2003)	Nayee Padosan (2003)

The trio of Shankar–Ehsaan–Loy composed Armaan's soundtrack, with lyrics written by Akhtar. Bachchan, Udit Narayan, Mahalakshmi Iyer, Shankar Mahadevan, Alka Yagnik, Shaan, K. S. Chithra, Sonu Nigam, Sunidhi Chauhan, Shreya Ghoshal, and Roop Kumar Rathod performed the vocals. The T-Series label released it on 22 March 2003.

The soundtrack album garnered positive responses from critics. Writing for the entertainment portal Bollywood Hungama, Joginder Tuteja called it "a class product" that "strikes a chord with everyone alike". The Hindu believed that Shankar–Ehsaan–Loy had composed an "uplifting" soundtrack. Lalitha Suhasini of The Indian Express declared it one of the greatest albums of the year. Planet Bollywood's Rakesh Budhu added, "For Armaan, Shankar–Ehsaan–Loy have shown us why their talent is worth our attention and how they are different from other great composers, like A. R. Rahman."

Armaan (Original Motion Picture Soundtrack)
No.	Title	Singer(s)	Length
1.	"Aao Milke Gaayen Aisa Gaana"	Amitabh Bachchan, Udit Narayan, Mahalakshmi Iyer, Shankar Mahadevan	5:16
2.	"Jaane Ye Kya Ho Gaya"	Shankar Mahadevan, Alka Yagnik	6:41
3.	"Jugalbandi" (Instrumental)		3:26
4.	"Meri Zindagi Mein Aaye Ho"	Sonu Nigam, Sunidhi Chauhan	5:28
5.	"Mere Dil Ka Tumse"	K. S. Chithra	4:53
6.	"Main Gaoon Tum Gao"	Udit Narayan, Mahalakshmi Iyer, Shaan	5:23
7.	"Tu Hi Bata Zindagi"	Shreya Ghoshal	5:22
8.	"Tu Hi Bata Zindagi" (Male Version)	Roop Kumar Rathod	5:22
9.	"Dialogues"	Amitabh Bachchan	0:32
Total length:			42:23

== Marketing and release ==
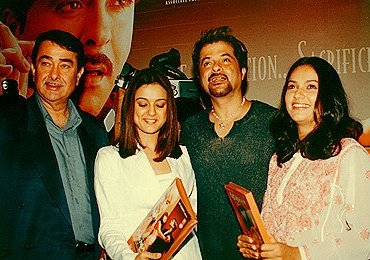
From left to right: Randhir Kapoor, Preity Zinta, Anil Kapoor, and Gracy Singh at the website launch of Armaan in 2003

Armaan was one of the most anticipated Indian films of the year, owing to the advertising describing it as the first film directed by Irani, known as an established screenwriter. This resulted in increased enthusiasm by moviegoers to see the film. However, talking to journalist Suchitra Behal of The Hindu, Irani said she had low expectations for the film and spoke of her nervousness over its commercial performance. As part of the promotion, an official website was launched at a press conference held in Mumbai in April 2003. In an article on Rediff.com, Subhash K. Jha wrote that people's word-of-mouth described the film as a thanda (transl. cold) film.

Armaan premiered on 16 May 2003 and was screened at the 2003 Cannes Film Festival the following day. It was released on 195 screens across India and grossed ₹7.5 million (US$80,000) on the first day, which Filmfare magazine thought was poor. By the end of its first week, the film had collected ₹39.4 million (US$420,000). In the second week of its overseas run, Armaan had earned $296,702 and $691,121 in the United States and the United Kingdom, respectively. According to Box Office India, it collected a total gross of ₹149.5 million (US$1.6 million) worldwide and was declared a commercial failure. The film remains as Irani's only directorial project; she is continuing her work as a screenwriter.

Armaan was subsequently released on DVD on 30 June as a single-disc pack in the NTSC widescreen format.

== Reception ==
=== Critical response ===
Upon its release Armaan met with a mixed critical reception. The cast's performances (mostly those of Bachchan and Zinta) were praised lavishly. Critics, however, panned Irani's direction and the film's slow pace and the plot's lack of freshness. Sanjeev Singh Bariana of The Tribune was impressed by its technical detail and commended Zinta for having "outclassed everyone". In his review, Komal Nahta noted the resemblance between the film and the 2002 television series Sanjivani, in which the main set is also a hospital. Khalid Mohamed, writing for Mid-Day, noted Irani's sincerity but was critical of the outcome. He did, however, praise Bachchan as "faultless" and call Zinta "the peppy scene-stealer, achieving her manic mood swings dexterously". Similar views were expressed by Vinayak Chakravorty from Hindustan Times; he concluded in his review that there was "nothing to write home about in this film" except for Zinta's performance, which he felt "takes over the script and, indeed, the film, unleashing a brilliant act as the deceptively bubbly but manipulative wife". Dinesh Raheja referred to Zinta as the film's main attraction and had a positive opinion of Anil Kapoor and Randhir Kapoor as well, explaining their performance would lead the viewer to make "a connection between good acting and the Kapoor surname".

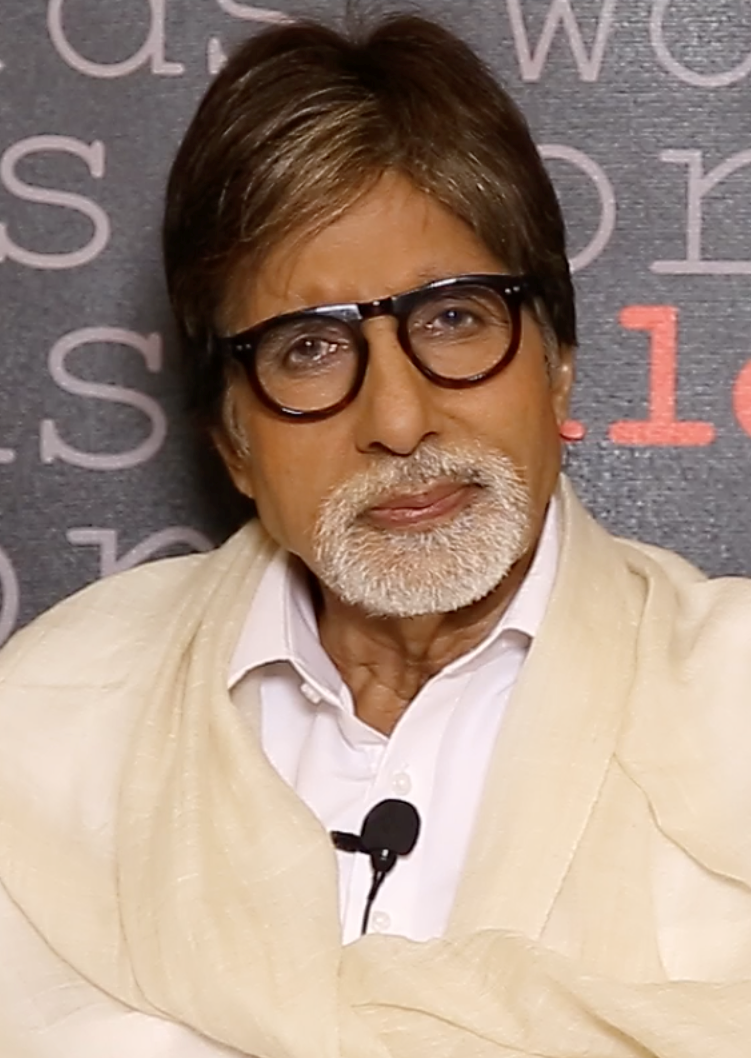
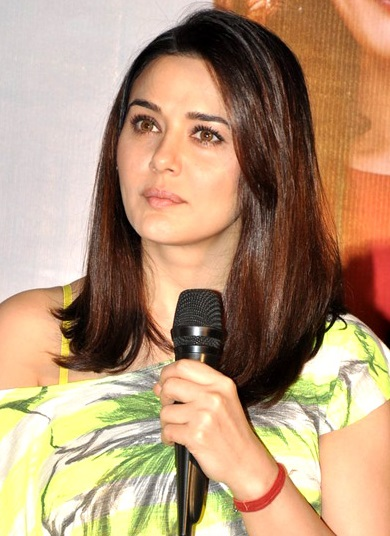
Most critics were impressed by the performances of Amitabh Bachchan (left) and Preity Zinta (right).

Screen's Deven Sharma described Armaan as "a truthful depiction of a professional's integrity to his calling and to himself, and despite the somewhat slow pace, manages to tug at your heart". He wrote of the cast, "The four principal actors have risen above their roles and have given splendid performances." Ziya Us Salam of The Hindu observed of Hirani's direction: "Her ways have to be admired, her lines good enough to bear repetition, her sensitivity worthy of emulation. However, let's refrain from too much adulation as her debut venture Armaan has its bleak moments too, just as it has its sunny ones." He further praised Singh's "poised, pleasant" acting and Zinta for her "verve and vivacity" as a "blundering, scheming spoilt child who marries innocence with guile", hailing her performance as "just about perfect". Sify called the film "an entertainer" which is "pleasing to the eye" with a good storyline. The reviewer praised Irani for having "brought out some of the best moments in Amitabh Bachchan's and Anil Kapoor's career", and took note of Zinta's screen presence, commending her for proving "she is one among those actresses who can combine good looks with histrionics".

Jitesh Pillai of The Times of India was ambivalent about Armaan; he criticised its "crippling pace", but appreciated the credibility of the script, the cinematography, and the actors, calling Bachchan "brilliant", Kapoor "first-rate" and commending Singh for bringing dignity to her underdeveloped role and Zinta for adding "vim, vigour and sparkles with comic timing" to her part. Rediff.com's critic Deepa Gumaste was highly critical of the film, disliking the performances and finding the overall product to be "way off the mark". Giving the film two stars, Namrata Joshi of Outlook found it disappointing and after comparing it to the 1960 film Dil Apna Aur Preet Parai, said that Armaan only repeats the story but with a different ending. Taran Adarsh from Bollywood Hungama praised the acting while concluding the film "leaves a lot to be desired. The content ... does not match the heavy star cast, which in turn will tell on its business." Another review for Mid Day, by Narendra Kusnur, wrote the film off as extremely slow but liked the actors' performances.

Manish Gajjar of the BBC applauded Irani for revisiting "the same formula ... [adding] freshness and zest", further praising Kapoor for delivering "his best" performance, Zinta for her "superb acting" and Bachchan for "outstanding performance". Derek Elley of Variety declared Bachchan the film's headline, but believed his performance was largely overshadowed by the other leads, adding, "Bollywood watchers should keep an eye out for this well-scripted item." He singled out Zinta's colourful performance noting, "though playing an archetypal bad sort, manages to make the self-obsessed Soniya an almost sympathetic character through the sheer vivaciousness of her part-child, part-vamp playing". Deepa Gahlot wrote, "Anil Kapoor is earnest as always, but looks jaded. Preity Zinta in an awful 'Cleopatra' get-up is irritatingly twittery, and Gracy Singh totally bland." She was disappointed by the casting of Bachchan in what she described as "an insignificant role, [which] getting rid of him and then making him walk around as a ghost." In a review in Stardust magazine, the editor Ram Kamal Mukherjee felt the entire film was "predictable and boring at times", attributing this to the screenplay and Irani's direction.

=== Accolades ===
Award	Category	Recipient(s) and nominee(s)	Result	Ref(s)
Filmfare Awards	Best Performance in a Negative Role	Preity Zinta	Nominated	
Producers Guild Film Awards	Best Actress in a Supporting Role	Preity Zinta	Nominated	
Screen Awards	Best Actor in a Negative Role	Preity Zinta	Nominated	
Screen Awards	Best Female Playback	Sunidhi Chauhan (for "Meri Zindagi Mein Aaye Ho")	Nominated	
Stardust Awards	Breakthrough Performance – Female	Gracy Singh	Nominated	
