= Veer-Zaara (soundtrack) =

Soundtrack album by Madan Mohan and Sanjeev Kohli
- Released: 18 September 2004
- Recorded: 2003–2004
- Genre: Feature film soundtrack
- Length: 1:03:17
- Label: YRF Music
- Producer: Sanjeev Kohli

Madan Mohan chronology
| Chaal Baaz (1980) | Veer-Zaara (2004) |

Veer-Zaara is a soundtrack album to the 2004 film of the same name directed by Yash Chopra under the production of Yash Raj Films, starring Shah Rukh Khan, Preity Zinta and Rani Mukerji. The film features 11 songs based on compositions by the late Madan Mohan, which were revised by his son Sanjeev Kohli. The vocals are provided by Lata Mangeshkar, Jagjit Singh, Udit Narayan, Sonu Nigam, Gurdas Mann, Roop Kumar Rathod, Ahmed and Mohammed Hussain and Pritha Mazumder. The lyrics were written by Javed Akhtar. The soundtrack was released on 18 September 2004, becoming critically and commercially successful in terms of sales and became a recipient of numerous accolades.

== Development ==
Veer Zaara features 11 songs with music based on old compositions by the late music compser Madan Mohan, which was recreated by his son Sanjeev Kohli. Yash Chopra wanted Veer Zaara's soundtrack to have the "old-world charm", deviating from the Western influences in late 20th and early 21st century, as the film's storyline was set in the 1960s. Chopra met with several music directors, but ultimately did not come into fruition. When he met Sanjeev Kohli, the then CEO of Saregama, he explained the need of traditional music that replicated the era and its old-world charm. Kohli said that he had found Mohan's unused recordings shortly after his death in 1975. Over a hundred of his tunes were tested, with only thirty, which Chopra deemed as "impressive" and fitted the theme, were selected. Later, nine songs and two bonus tracks were finalized for the film which were revised by Kohli himself.

All the songs from the album were arranged by R. S. Mani and recorded at Studio One - Empire Studios in Mumbai. Pramod Chandorkar, Daman Sood and Vijay Dayal served as the recording engineers. R. S. Mani also composed the background score for the film. The film's album was mixed in a London-based studio, by mixing engineer Simon Changer.

Chopra requested Lata Mangeshkar to sing for all the female vocals in the soundtrack, as she was a frequent collaborator with Mohan. Upon attending the recording, with tears in her eyes, she told him, "Madan Mohan was like my brother. You [Chopra] are like my brother. I feel I have gone back in the past". Although Kohli felt hesitant, he and Chopra felt that "only Lataji could sing those tunes". The other male vocals were provided by other singers. With Veer Zaara, Chopra wanted the music to be a homage to Madan Mohan and his legacy.

== Release ==
Chopra further launched the music division of Yash Raj Films, known as YRF Music with Veer-Zaara being the first official album distributed by the company. The soundtrack was released on 18 September 2004 through CD, LP record and on Audio DVD, After its release, Chopra did not allow radio-stations to air its songs to generate curiosity. YRF Music also released a complete background music album of the film titled The Love Legend Themes on 30 August 2007.

== Reception ==
In a soundtrack review, Syed Firdaus Ashraf of Rediff.com states, "It will disappoint you at first, but if you listen to it repeatedly, the music will grow on you." Ashraf felt that "Kyon Hawa", sung by Sonu Nigam, was the best song in the album. Derek Elley of Variety agrees with Ashraf on the first point, writing, "While not instantly hummable, they do the job effectively." In a review of "Tere Liye", a Sify editor writes, "Madan Mohan's mastery with tunes is quite apparent in this number, parts of which are used often in the movie." Joginder Tuteja of Bollywood Hungama rated it 4 stars out of 5, writing, "Veer-Zaara is a mixed bag varying from a rich collection of love songs to emotional tracks to a patriotic number, a qawwali, a folk song and a ghazal. While the first half of the album is instantly appealing the second half will slowly grow on you." A reviewer for the BBC applauded the album, calling it "unique and special". The soundtrack was the highest-selling music album of the year in India, with sales of around 3 million units.

== Awards and nominations ==
List of accolades received by Veer-Zaara
| Award | Date of ceremony (Note: Date is linked to the article about the awards held that year, wherever possible.) | Category | Recipient(s) and nominee(s) | Result | Ref(s) |
|---|---|---|---|---|---|
| Bollywood Movie Awards | 30 April 2005 | Best Music Director | Madan Mohan | Won | |
| Bollywood Movie Awards | 30 April 2005 | Best Lyricist | Javed Akhtar for "Tere Liye" | Won | |
| Filmfare Awards | 26 May 2005 | Best Music Director | Madan Mohan | Nominated | |
| Filmfare Awards | 26 May 2005 | Best Lyricist | Javed Akhtar for "Tere Liye" | Won | |
| Filmfare Awards | 26 May 2005 | Best Lyricist | Javed Akhtar for "Main Yahaan Hoon" | Nominated | |
| Filmfare Awards | 26 May 2005 | Best Lyricist | Javed Akhtar for "Aisa Des Hai Mera" | Nominated | |
| Filmfare Awards | 26 May 2005 | Best Male Playback Singer | Sonu Nigam for "Do Pal" | Nominated | |
| Filmfare Awards | 26 May 2005 | Best Male Playback Singer | Udit Narayan for "Main Yahaan Hoon" | Nominated | |
| Global Indian Film Awards | 25 January 2005 | Best Lyrics | Javed Akhtar for "Main Yahaan Hoon" | Nominated | |
| Global Indian Film Awards | 25 January 2005 | Best Male Playback Singer | Udit Narayan for "Main Yahaan Hoon" | Nominated | |
| International Indian Film Academy Awards | 11 June 2005 | Best Music Director | Madan Mohan | Won | |
| Producers Guild Film Awards | 21 January 2006 | Best Music Director | Madan Mohan | Nominated | |
| Producers Guild Film Awards | 21 January 2006 | Best Lyricist | Javed Akhtar for "Do Pal" | Nominated | |
| Producers Guild Film Awards | 21 January 2006 | Best Male Playback Singer | Udit Narayan for "Main Yahaan Hoon" | Nominated | |
| Screen Awards | 18 January 2005 | Best Lyricist | Javed Akhtar for "Tere Liye" | Nominated | |
| Screen Awards | 18 January 2005 | Best Male Playback | Udit Narayan for "Main Yahaan Hoon" | Nominated | |

== Track listing ==
Veer-Zaara (Original Motion Picture Soundtrack)
| No. | Title | Singer(s) | Length |
|---|---|---|---|
| 1. | "Hum To Bhai Jaise Hain" | Lata Mangeshkar | 4:17 |
| 2. | "Main Yahaan Hoon" | Udit Narayan | 4:55 |
| 3. | "Aisa Des Hai Mera" | Lata Mangeshkar, Udit Narayan, Gurdas Maan, Pritha Mazumdar | 7:07 |
| 4. | "Aaya Tere Dar Par" | Ahmed Hussain, Mohammad Hussain, Mohd. Vakil, Javed Hussain | 7:51 |
| 5. | "Do Pal" | Lata Mangeshkar, Sonu Nigam | 4:25 |
| 6. | "Yeh Hum Aa Gaye Hain Kahaan" | Lata Mangeshkar, Udit Narayan | 5:43 |
| 7. | "Tere Liye" | Lata Mangeshkar, Roop Kumar Rathod | 5:31 |
| 8. | "Kyon Hawa" | Lata Mangeshkar, Sonu Nigam, Yash Chopra | 6:11 |
| 9. | "Lodi" | Lata Mangeshkar, Gurdas Maan, Udit Narayan | 6:52 |
| 10. | "Tum Paas Aa Rahe Ho (Not in film)" | Lata Mangeshkar, Jagjit Singh | 5:09 |
| 11. | "Jaane Kyon (Not in film)" | Lata Mangeshkar | 5:16 |

The Love Legend Themes: Veer-Zaara
| No. | Title | Length |
|---|---|---|
| 1. | "The Love Legend Theme" | 1:17 |
| 2. | "Veer Rescues Zaara" | 4:21 |
| 3. | "Bebe's Theme" | 3:13 |
| 4. | "Bebe's Last Rites" | 2:17 |
| 5. | "Zaara’s Day In Veer's Village" | 4:20 |
| 6. | "Zaara-Maati Theme" | 2:08 |
| 7. | "Zaara-Bauji Theme" | 1:16 |
| 8. | "Bauji's Vision" | 2:43 |
| 9. | "Raza's Theme" | 1:53 |
| 10. | "Veer-Zaara Part At Station" | 2:13 |
| 11. | "Do Pal (Instrumental)" | 4:23 |
| 12. | "Zaara's Father's Theme" | 1:47 |
| 13. | "Zaara Reveals Her Love To Her Mother" | 2:31 |
| 14. | "Main Yahaan Hoon (Instrumental)" | 4:39 |
| 15. | "Veer's Story – Saamiya's Theme" | 3:11 |
| 16. | "Zaara's Mother's Plea To Veer" | 3:28 |
| 17. | "Veer-Zaara Part Again" | 3:06 |
| 18. | "Veer-Saamiya Before the Trial" | 1:20 |
| 19. | "Yeh Hum Aa Gaye Hain Kahaan" | 4:27 |
| 20. | "Saamiya's Plea To Veer" | 3:09 |
| 21. | "Saamiya Finds Zaara" | 3:49 |
| 22. | "Tere Liye (Instrumental)" | 5:20 |
| 23. | "Veer's Court Room Poem Theme" | 3:43 |
| 24. | "Veer-Zaara United At Last" | 3:07 |
