= List of accolades received by Veer-Zaara =

Veer-Zaara awards and nominations
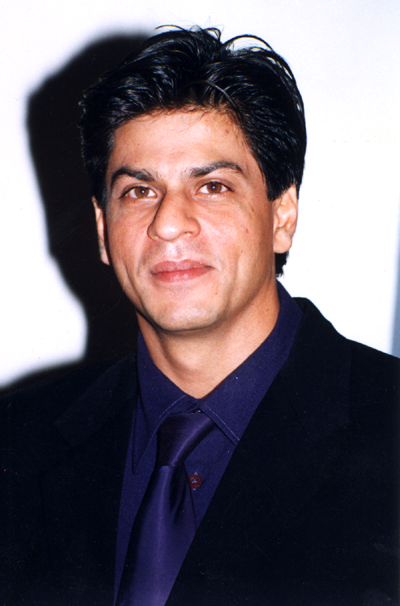
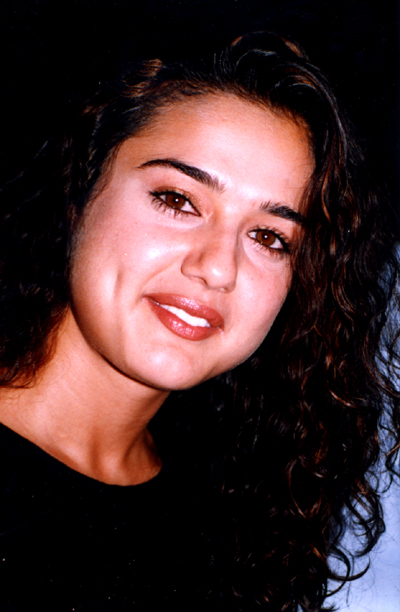
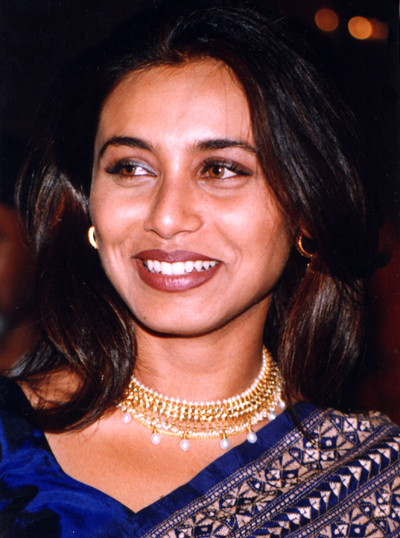
- Shah Rukh Khan, Preity Zinta, and Rani Mukerji even garnered several accolades for their performance in Veer-Zaara.
Awards and nominations
Award	Wins	Nominations
Bollywood Movie Awards	8	14
Filmfare Awards	4	15
Global Indian Film Awards	2	15
International Indian Film Academy Awards	7	9
National Film Awards	1	1
Producers Guild Film Awards	1	10
Screen Awards	5	15
Stardust Awards	2	4
Zee Cine Awards	4	9

Totals (Note: Certain award groups do not simply award one winner. They acknowledge several different recipients, have runners-up, and have third place. Since this is a specific recognition and is different from losing an award, runner-up mentions are considered wins in this award tally. For simplification and to avoid errors, each award in this list has been presumed to have had a prior nomination.)
- Wins: 34
- Nominations: 92

Veer-Zaara is a 2004 Indian Hindi-language romantic drama film directed by Yash Chopra and written by Aditya Chopra. The film stars Shah Rukh Khan, Preity Zinta, and Rani Mukerji, while Manoj Bajpayee, Amitabh Bachchan, Hema Malini, Boman Irani, Kirron Kher, Divya Dutta, and Anupam Kher form the supporting cast. Set against the background of India–Pakistan relations, it focuses on the titular star-crossed lovers—Veer Pratap Singh (Khan), an Indian Air Force pilot, and Zaara Hayaat Khan (Zinta), a Pakistani woman—whose love story spans across two decades amid trials and tribulations and the young lawyer Saamiya Siddiqui (Mukerji) who tries to help the couple. The soundtrack of Veer-Zaara is based on music by Madan Mohan, which was later revised by his son Sanjeev Kohli. The film was shot by Anil Mehta on sets that were designed by Sharmishta Roy and was edited by Ritesh Soni.

Filmed on a production cost of ₹180 million (US$1.9 million), it premiered on 12 November 2004 and received widespread critical acclaim. A major commercial success, the film emerged as India's highest-grossing film of the year, earning ₹976.4 million (US$10 million) in both India and abroad. The British academic Rachel Dwyer of the British Film Institute included the film in her "10 Great Bollywood Romance Films" listing. The film won 34 awards out of 92 nominations; the story, screenplay direction, performances of the cast, soundtrack, and the lyrical composition garnered the most attention from various award groups.

Veer-Zaara won the Best Popular Film Providing Wholesome Entertainment at the 52nd National Film Awards. It was nominated in fifteen categories at the 50th Filmfare Awards, including Best Director (Yash Chopra), Best Actor (Khan), Best Actress (Zinta), Best Supporting Actor (Amitabh Bachchan), and two nominations for Best Supporting Actress (Dutta and Mukerji), and won four including Best Film. In the sixth iteration of the International Indian Film Academy Awards, the film received seven awards including Best Film, Best Director for Chopra, Best Actor for Khan, and Best Supporting Actress for Mukerji. Veer-Zaara also earned two Global Indian Film Awards, one Producers Guild Film Award, five Screen Awards, two Stardust Awards, and four Zee Cine Awards.

== Awards and nominations ==
List of accolades received by Veer-Zaara
Award	Date of ceremony (Note: Date is linked to the article about the awards held that year, wherever possible.)	Category	Recipient(s) and nominee(s)	Result	Ref(s)
Bollywood Movie Awards	30 April 2005	Best Film	Veer-Zaara	Won	
Bollywood Movie Awards	30 April 2005	Best Director	Yash Chopra	Won	
Bollywood Movie Awards	30 April 2005	Best Actor	Shah Rukh Khan	Won	
Bollywood Movie Awards	30 April 2005	Best Actress	Preity Zinta	Nominated	
Bollywood Movie Awards	30 April 2005	Best Supporting Actress	Divya Dutta	Nominated	
Bollywood Movie Awards	30 April 2005	Best Supporting Actress	Rani Mukerji	Nominated	
Bollywood Movie Awards	30 April 2005	Best Music Director	Madan Mohan	Won	
Bollywood Movie Awards	30 April 2005	Best Lyricist	Javed Akhtar for "Tere Liye"	Won	
Bollywood Movie Awards	30 April 2005	Best Cinematography	Anil Mehta	Nominated	
Bollywood Movie Awards	30 April 2005	Best Dialogue	Aditya Chopra	Nominated	
Bollywood Movie Awards	30 April 2005	Best Screenplay	Aditya Chopra	Nominated	
Bollywood Movie Awards	30 April 2005	Best Story	Aditya Chopra	Won	
Bollywood Movie Awards	30 April 2005	Best Art Direction	Sharmishta Roy	Won	
Bollywood Movie Awards	30 April 2005	Best Costume Designer	Manish Malhotra	Won	
Filmfare Awards	26 May 2005	Best Film	Veer-Zaara	Won	
Filmfare Awards	26 May 2005	Best Director	Yash Chopra	Nominated	
Filmfare Awards	26 May 2005	Best Actor	Shah Rukh Khan	Nominated	
Filmfare Awards	26 May 2005	Best Actress	Preity Zinta	Nominated	
Filmfare Awards	26 May 2005	Best Supporting Actor	Amitabh Bachchan	Nominated	
Filmfare Awards	26 May 2005	Best Supporting Actress	Divya Dutta	Nominated	
Filmfare Awards	26 May 2005	Best Supporting Actress	Rani Mukerji	Nominated	
Filmfare Awards	26 May 2005	Best Music Director	Madan Mohan	Nominated	
Filmfare Awards	26 May 2005	Best Lyricist	Javed Akhtar for "Tere Liye"	Won	
Filmfare Awards	26 May 2005	Best Lyricist	Javed Akhtar for "Main Yahaan Hoon"	Nominated	
Filmfare Awards	26 May 2005	Best Lyricist	Javed Akhtar for "Aisa Des Hai Mera"	Nominated	
Filmfare Awards	26 May 2005	Best Male Playback Singer	Sonu Nigam for "Do Pal"	Nominated	
Filmfare Awards	26 May 2005	Best Male Playback Singer	Udit Narayan for "Main Yahaan Hoon"	Nominated	
Filmfare Awards	26 May 2005	Best Dialogue	Aditya Chopra	Won	
Filmfare Awards	26 May 2005	Best Story	Aditya Chopra	Won	
Global Indian Film Awards	25 January 2005	Best Film	Veer-Zaara	Nominated	
Global Indian Film Awards	25 January 2005	Best Director	Yash Chopra	Nominated	
Global Indian Film Awards	25 January 2005	Best Actress	Preity Zinta	Nominated	
Global Indian Film Awards	25 January 2005	Best Supporting Actor	Amitabh Bachchan	Nominated	
Global Indian Film Awards	25 January 2005	Best Supporting Actress	Divya Dutta	Won	
Global Indian Film Awards	25 January 2005	Best Supporting Actress	Rani Mukerji	Nominated	
Global Indian Film Awards	25 January 2005	Best Lyrics	Javed Akhtar for "Main Yahaan Hoon"	Nominated	
Global Indian Film Awards	25 January 2005	Best Male Playback Singer	Udit Narayan for "Main Yahaan Hoon"	Nominated	
Global Indian Film Awards	25 January 2005	Best Cinematography	Anil Mehta	Nominated	
Global Indian Film Awards	25 January 2005	Best Editing	Ritesh Soni	Nominated	
Global Indian Film Awards	25 January 2005	Best Dialogue	Aditya Chopra	Nominated	
Global Indian Film Awards	25 January 2005	Best Screenplay	Aditya Chopra	Nominated	
Global Indian Film Awards	25 January 2005	Best Story	Aditya Chopra	Won	
Global Indian Film Awards	25 January 2005	Best Art Direction	Sharmishta Roy	Nominated	
Global Indian Film Awards	25 January 2005	Best Costume	Manish Malhotra	Nominated	
International Indian Film Academy Awards	11 June 2005	Best Film	Veer-Zaara	Won	
International Indian Film Academy Awards	11 June 2005	Best Director	Yash Chopra	Won	
International Indian Film Academy Awards	11 June 2005	Best Actor	Shah Rukh Khan	Won	
International Indian Film Academy Awards	11 June 2005	Best Supporting Actor	Amitabh Bachchan	Nominated	
International Indian Film Academy Awards	11 June 2005	Best Supporting Actress	Rani Mukerji	Won	
International Indian Film Academy Awards	11 June 2005	Best Supporting Actress	Divya Dutta	Nominated	
International Indian Film Academy Awards	11 June 2005	Best Music Director	Madan Mohan	Won	
International Indian Film Academy Awards	11 June 2005	Best Story	Aditya Chopra	Won	
International Indian Film Academy Awards	11 June 2005	Best Makeup	Anil V. Pemgirikar	Won	
National Film Awards	21 October 2005	Best Popular Film Providing Wholesome Entertainment	Veer-Zaara	Won (Note: Tied with Autograph (2004))	
Producers Guild Film Awards	21 January 2006	Best Actress in a Supporting Role	Rani Mukerji	Nominated	
Producers Guild Film Awards	21 January 2006	Best Music Director	Madan Mohan	Nominated	
Producers Guild Film Awards	21 January 2006	Best Lyricist	Javed Akhtar for "Do Pal"	Nominated	
Producers Guild Film Awards	21 January 2006	Best Male Playback Singer	Udit Narayan for "Main Yahaan Hoon"	Nominated	
Producers Guild Film Awards	21 January 2006	Best Cinematography	Anil Mehta	Nominated	
Producers Guild Film Awards	21 January 2006	Best Dialogue	Aditya Chopra	Won	
Producers Guild Film Awards	21 January 2006	Best Sound Recording	Anuj Mathur	Nominated	
Producers Guild Film Awards	21 January 2006	Best Sound Re-recording	Anup Dev	Nominated	
Producers Guild Film Awards	21 January 2006	Best Art Design	Sharmishta Roy	Nominated	
Producers Guild Film Awards	21 January 2006	Best Costume Design	Manish Malhotra	Nominated	
Screen Awards	18 January 2005	Best Film	Veer-Zaara	Won	
Screen Awards	18 January 2005	Best Director	Yash Chopra	Nominated	
Screen Awards	18 January 2005	Best Actor	Shah Rukh Khan	Won	
Screen Awards	18 January 2005	Best Actress	Preity Zinta	Nominated	
Screen Awards	18 January 2005	Best Supporting Actress	Divya Dutta	Nominated	
Screen Awards	18 January 2005	Best Supporting Actress	Rani Mukerji	Nominated	
Screen Awards	18 January 2005	Best Lyricist	Javed Akhtar for "Tere Liye"	Nominated	
Screen Awards	18 January 2005	Best Male Playback	Udit Narayan for "Main Yahaan Hoon"	Nominated	
Screen Awards	18 January 2005	Best Background Music	R. S. Mani	Nominated	
Screen Awards	18 January 2005	Best Cinematography	Anil Mehta	Nominated	
Screen Awards	18 January 2005	Best Art Direction	Sharmishta Roy	Nominated	
Screen Awards	18 January 2005	Best Dialogue	Aditya Chopra	Won	
Screen Awards	18 January 2005	Best Screenplay	Aditya Chopra	Nominated	
Screen Awards	18 January 2005	Best Story	Aditya Chopra	Won	
Screen Awards	18 January 2005	Jodi No. 1	Shah Rukh Khan, Preity Zinta	Won	
Stardust Awards	20 February 2005	Star of the Year – Female	Preity Zinta	Won	
Stardust Awards	20 February 2005	Best Supporting Actress	Kirron Kher	Won	
Stardust Awards	20 February 2005	Best Supporting Actress	Divya Dutta	Nominated	
Stardust Awards	20 February 2005	Best Supporting Actress	Rani Mukerji	Nominated	
Zee Cine Awards	26 March 2005	Best Film	Veer-Zaara	Won	
Zee Cine Awards	26 March 2005	Best Director	Yash Chopra	Won	
Zee Cine Awards	26 March 2005	Best Actor – Male	Shah Rukh Khan	Won	
Zee Cine Awards	26 March 2005	Best Actor – Female	Preity Zinta	Nominated	
Zee Cine Awards	26 March 2005	Best Actor in a Supporting Role – Male	Amitabh Bachchan	Nominated	
Zee Cine Awards	26 March 2005	Best Actor in a Supporting Role – Female	Divya Dutta	Won	
Zee Cine Awards	26 March 2005	Best Story	Aditya Chopra	Nominated	
Zee Cine Awards	26 March 2005	Best Art Direction	Sharmishta Roy	Nominated	
Zee Cine Awards	26 March 2005	Best Sound Re-recording	Anup Dev	Nominated	
