= List of accolades received by Mohabbatein =

Mohabbatein awards and nominations
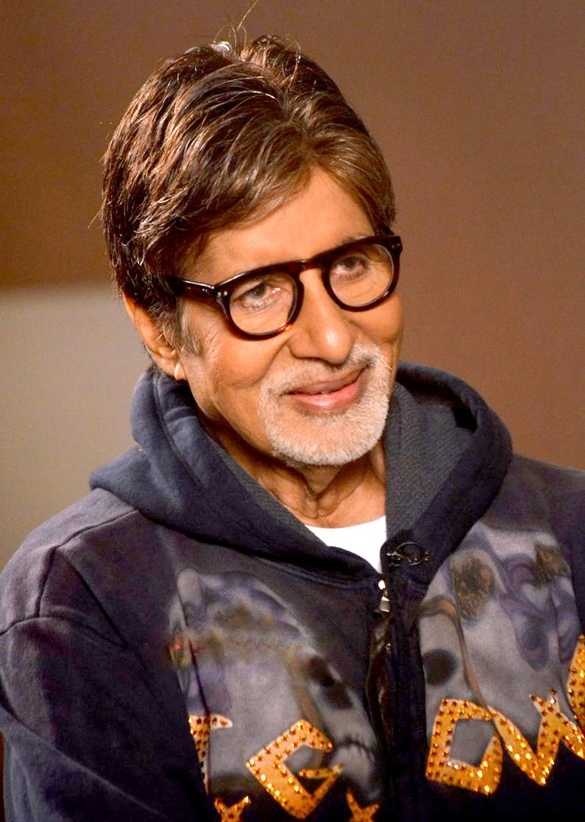
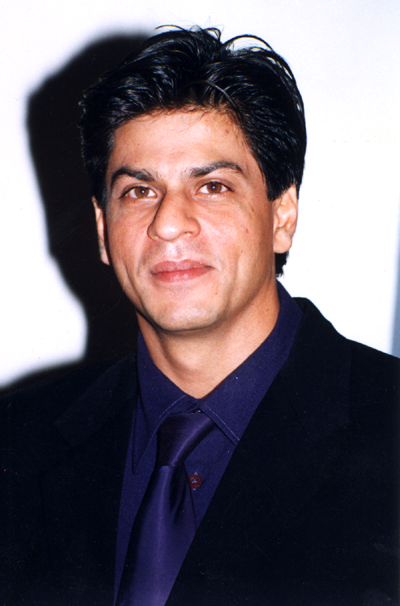
- Amitabh Bachchan and Shahrukh Khan received several accolades for their performance in Mohabbatein
Awards and nominations
Award	Wins	Nominations
Bollywood Movie Awards	3	12
Filmfare Awards	3	9
International Indian Film Academy Awards	4	9
Sansui Viewers' Choice Movie Awards	5	5
Screen Awards	1	11
Zee Cine Awards	2	2

Totals (Note: Certain award groups do not simply award one winner. They acknowledge several different recipients, have runners-up, and have third place. Since this is a specific recognition and is different from losing an award, runner-up mentions are considered wins in this award tally. For simplification and to avoid errors, each award in this list has been presumed to have had a prior nomination.)
- Wins: 18
- Nominations: 48

Mohabbatein (transl. Love Stories) is a 2000 Indian Hindi-language musical romantic drama film written and directed by Aditya Chopra. It stars an ensemble cast of Amitabh Bachchan, Shah Rukh Khan, Aishwarya Rai, and the newcomers Uday Chopra, Shamita Shetty, Jugal Hansraj, Kim Sharma, Jimmy Sheirgill, and Preeti Jhangiani. It tells the story of a fictional all-boys college Gurukul's principal Narayan Shankar (Bachchan) who prohibits his students from falling in love and will unhesitantly expel those who do not obey the rule. The rest of the film focuses on how the arrival of the violin teacher Raj Aryan Malhotra (Khan) changes his views. Mohabbatein's soundtrack was composed by Jatin–Lalit, and the lyrics were written by Anand Bakshi. The film was shot by Manmohan Singh on sets designed by Sharmishta Roy, while the editor was V. Karnik.

The film opened at theatres on 27 October 2000 and was met with widespread acclaim from critics, who praised the performances of Bachchan and Khan. Made on a production budget of ₹130 million (US$1.5 million), the film had a total gross of ₹900.1 million (US$10 million) becoming the year's highest-grossing Indian film.

Mohabbatein won 18 awards out of 48 nominations; the cast's performances, the story, and the screenplay garnered the most attention from various award groups. At the 46th Filmfare Awards, it was nominated in nine categories including Best Film, Best Director (Aditya Chopra), Best Actor (Khan), Best Supporting Actress (Rai), and Best Music Director (Jatin–Lalit). It went on to win three awards including those for Best Actor – Critics (Khan) and Best Supporting Actor (Bachchan). In the second iteration of the International Indian Film Academy Awards, the film received nine nominations including Best Film, Best Director for Aditya Chopra, and Best Actor for Khan, and won four including Best Supporting Actor for Bachchan. Among other wins, it also received three Bollywood Movie Awards, one Screen Award, and two Zee Cine Awards.

== Awards and nominations ==
List of accolades received by Mohabbatein
Award	Date of ceremony (Note: The date is linked to the article about the awards held that year, wherever possible.)	Category	Recipient(s)	Result	Ref.
Bollywood Movie Awards	28 April 2001	Best Film	Mohabbatein	Nominated	
Bollywood Movie Awards	28 April 2001	Best Director	Aditya Chopra	Nominated	
Bollywood Movie Awards	28 April 2001	Best Actor	Shah Rukh Khan	Nominated	
Bollywood Movie Awards	28 April 2001	Best Actor (Critics)	Amitabh Bachchan	Won	
Bollywood Movie Awards	28 April 2001	Best Comedian	Anupam Kher	Nominated	
Bollywood Movie Awards	28 April 2001	Best Debut – Male	Uday Chopra	Nominated	
Bollywood Movie Awards	28 April 2001	Best Music Director	Jatin–Lalit	Nominated	
Bollywood Movie Awards	28 April 2001	Best Lyricist	Anand Bakshi (for "Humko Humise Chura Lo")	Nominated	
Bollywood Movie Awards	28 April 2001	Best Story	Aditya Chopra	Won	
Bollywood Movie Awards	28 April 2001	Best Screenplay	Aditya Chopra	Won	
Bollywood Movie Awards	28 April 2001	Best Costume Design	Karan Johar, Manish Malhotra	Nominated	
Bollywood Movie Awards	28 April 2001	Best Cinematography	Manmohan Singh	Nominated	
Filmfare Awards	17 February 2001	Best Film	Mohabbatein	Nominated	
Filmfare Awards	17 February 2001	Best Director	Aditya Chopra	Nominated	
Filmfare Awards	17 February 2001	Best Actor	Shah Rukh Khan	Nominated	
Filmfare Awards	17 February 2001	Best Actor (Critics)	Shah Rukh Khan	Won	
Filmfare Awards	17 February 2001	Best Supporting Actor	Amitabh Bachchan	Won	
Filmfare Awards	17 February 2001	Best Supporting Actress	Aishwarya Rai	Nominated	
Filmfare Awards	17 February 2001	Best Music Director	Jatin–Lalit	Nominated	
Filmfare Awards	17 February 2001	Best Lyricist	Anand Bakshi (for "Humko Humise Chura Lo")	Nominated	
Filmfare Awards	17 February 2001	Best Male Playback Singer	Udit Narayan (for "Humko Humise Chura Lo")	Nominated	
Filmfare Awards	17 February 2001	Best Story	Aditya Chopra	Nominated	
Filmfare Awards	17 February 2001	Best Dialogue	Aditya Chopra	Nominated	
Filmfare Awards	17 February 2001	Best Sound Design	Anuj Mathur, Kunal Mehta	Won	
International Indian Film Academy Awards	16 June 2001	Best Film	Mohabbatein	Nominated	
International Indian Film Academy Awards	16 June 2001	Best Director	Aditya Chopra	Nominated	
International Indian Film Academy Awards	16 June 2001	Best Actor	Shah Rukh Khan	Nominated	
International Indian Film Academy Awards	16 June 2001	Best Supporting Actor	Amitabh Bachchan	Won	
International Indian Film Academy Awards	16 June 2001	Best Music Director	Jatin–Lalit	Nominated	
International Indian Film Academy Awards	16 June 2001	Best Performance in a Comic Role	Anupam Kher	Nominated	
International Indian Film Academy Awards	16 June 2001	Best Performance in a Comic Role	Archana Puran Singh	Nominated	
International Indian Film Academy Awards	16 June 2001	Best Story	Aditya Chopra	Won	
International Indian Film Academy Awards	16 June 2001	Best Dialogue	Aditya Chopra	Won	
International Indian Film Academy Awards	16 June 2001	Best Costume Design	Karan Johar, Manish Malhotra	Won	
Sansui Viewers' Choice Movie Awards	3 June 2001	Best Actor	Shah Rukh Khan	Won	
Sansui Viewers' Choice Movie Awards	3 June 2001	Best Supporting Actor	Amitabh Bachchan	Won	
Sansui Viewers' Choice Movie Awards	3 June 2001	Best Actor in a Comic Role	Anupam Kher	Won	
Sansui Viewers' Choice Movie Awards	3 June 2001	Best Dialogue	Aditya Chopra	Won	
Sansui Viewers' Choice Movie Awards	3 June 2001	Best Cinematography	Manmohan Singh	Won	
Screen Awards	20 January 2001	Best Film	Mohabbatein	Nominated	
Screen Awards	20 January 2001	Best Director	Aditya Chopra	Nominated	
Screen Awards	20 January 2001	Best Actor	Shah Rukh Khan	Nominated	
Screen Awards	20 January 2001	Best Supporting Actor	Amitabh Bachchan	Nominated	
Screen Awards	20 January 2001	Best Music Director	Jatin–Lalit	Nominated	
Screen Awards	20 January 2001	Best Lyricist	Anand Bakshi (for "Humko Humise Chura Lo")	Won	
Screen Awards	20 January 2001	Best Dialogue	Aditya Chopra	Nominated	
Screen Awards	20 January 2001	Best Cinematography	Manmohan Singh	Nominated	
Screen Awards	20 January 2001	Best Art Direction	Sharmishta Roy	Nominated	
Screen Awards	20 January 2001	Best Choreography	Farah Khan (for "Pairon Mein Bandhan Hai")	Nominated	
Screen Awards	20 January 2001	Best Male Debut	Uday Chopra	Nominated	
Zee Cine Awards	17 March 2001	Best Art Direction	Sharmishta Roy	Won	
Zee Cine Awards	17 March 2001	Best Costume Design	Karan Johar, Manish Malhotra	Won	

== Sources ==
- "'Kaho na...' sweeps Sansui awards". The Tribune. New Delhi, India. United News of India. 3 June 2001. Archived from the original on 4 March 2016.
- Aiyar, Shankkar; Unnithan, Sandeep (10 July 2000). "Bollywood goes global, powered by diaspora dollar". India Today. Archived from the original on 26 October 2021.
- Bhattacharya, Roshmila (26 January 2001). "Seventh Screen Videocon Awards". Screen. Archived from the original on 5 March 2001.
- "Big night". Filmfare Awards. Archived from the original on 10 February 2001.
- Dhirad, Sandeep (2006). "Filmfare nominees and winners" (PDF). Filmfare Awards. pp. 107–109. Archived (PDF) from the original on 19 October 2015.
- "Getting to Nassau Veterans Memorial Coliseum". Bollywood Movie Awards. Archived from the original on 24 January 2001.
- "Kaho Naa Pyaar Hai all the way, bags 8 trophies". The Indian Express. 21 January 2001. Archived from the original on 24 February 2004.
- Kamath, Sudhish (28 October 2000). "Sparks fly on Deepavali". The Hindu. Archived from the original on 28 March 2021.
- "Kelvinator IIFA Awards: Nominations". International Indian Film Academy Awards. Archived from the original on 24 October 2002.
- "List of awards won by Mohabbatein movie". Yash Raj Films. Archived from the original on 23 January 2021.
- Nahta, Komal (8 November 2000). "Mohabbatein wins, Mission Kashmir loses". Rediff.com. Archived from the original on 24 April 2003.
- "Nominations for 7th Annual Screen Awards are". Screen. Archived from the original on 19 February 2004.
- "Nominations out for 4th Lux Zee Cine Awards". Indian Television. 23 February 2001. Archived from the original on 3 March 2001.
- Padmanabhan, Savitha (3 November 2000). "Film review: Mohabbatein". The Hindu. Archived from the original on 28 March 2021.
- Patil, Vimla (9 June 2001). "Bollywood's mega show in Sun City". The Tribune. Archived from the original on 2 December 2008.
- Sheikh, Rahil (21 June 2005). "Different faces of SRK". Rediff.com. Archived from the original on 26 January 2021.
- Tarafdar, Suman (October 2000). "Mohabbatein". Filmfare. Archived from the original on 9 November 2001.
- "The nominees for the Bollywood Awards 2001 were". Bollywood Movie Awards. Archived from the original on 7 April 2002.
- "Top worldwide grossers 2000". Box Office India. Archived from the original on 19 November 2020.
- "Winners of the Bollywood Awards 2001". Bollywood Movie Awards. Archived from the original on 7 April 2002.
