= Aitraaz =

2004 Indian film by Abbas-Mustan

- Theatrical release poster
- Directed by: Abbas–Mustan
- Written by: Shiraz Ahmed; Shyam Goel
- Dialogues by: Aadesh K. Arjun
- Based on: Disclosure by Barry Levinson
- Produced by: Subhash Ghai
- Starring: Akshay Kumar; Priyanka Chopra; Kareena Kapoor; Amrish Puri; Annu Kapoor; Paresh Rawal
- Cinematography: Ravi Yadav
- Edited by: Hussain A. Burmawala
- Music by: Songs: Himesh Reshammiya; Background Score: Salim–Sulaiman
- Production company: Mukta Arts
- Distributed by: Zee Films
- Release date: 12 November 2004
- Running time: 159 minutes
- Country: India
- Language: Hindi
- Budget: ₹11 crore
- Box office: ₹26 crore

Aitraaz (transl. Objection) is a 2004 Indian Hindi-language romantic psychological thriller film directed by Abbas–Mustan and produced by Subhash Ghai. It stars Akshay Kumar, Priyanka Chopra and Kareena Kapoor.

Aitraaz tells the story of a man accused of sexual harassment by his female superior, and was released on 12 November 2004 to positive reviews. Chopra received widespread critical acclaim for her performance. Loosely based on the 1994 film Disclosure, the film was moderately successful at the box office, doing a business of ₹26 crores at the box office against a budget of ₹11 crores, and has been noted for its bold subject of male sexual harassment.

Aitraaz received several accolades, particularly for Chopra. At the 50th Filmfare Awards, Kapoor was nominated for Best Actress and Chopra was nominated for the Best Supporting Actress and Best Villain, winning the latter and thus becoming the second (and final) (Note: The award was discontinued in 2008.) actress to win the award. Chopra also won the Bengal Film Journalists' Association Award for Best Actress and the Screen Award for Best Villain. The film received ten nominations at the 2005 IIFA Awards, winning three.

== Plot ==
Raj Malhotra, an orphan, works as a product engineer for Voice Mobiles and lives in a rented house. Junior lawyer Priya Saxena mistakes him for his neighbor, Barrister Ram Chotrani, for whom she applied for a job as an assistant, due to their house numbers. Raj falls in love with Priya at first sight, and they eventually get married.

Two years later, Priya is pregnant, and the couple move into their own bungalow, expecting Raj’s promotion to CEO of Voice Mobiles. However, at the company’s anniversary event, the chairman Ranjit Roy, arrives with his much younger wife, Sonia, and appoints his friend Rakesh as the new CEO, while Raj joins the board of directors.

A flashback shows Raj’s past in Cape Town, South Africa, where he worked for MTN Mobile Company. There he met Sonia, who worked as a model, and they began a relationship. However, Raj’s insecurity about her modeling career caused tensions. When Sonia became pregnant, she refused Raj’s offer to marry and decided to abort the child to focus on her ambitions for wealth and power. This led to their breakup.

In the present, Rakesh informs Raj about a defect in their new mobile handset, causing calls to connect to the intended recipient and another random person in the contact list. Raj visits Sonia for authorization to stop production, for which Sonia calls him to her house. Sonia makes inappropriate advances towards him, which Raj continuously rejects and escapes.

The following day, Sonia falsely accuses Raj of sexual harassment and attempted rape. Ranjit demands his resignation to avoid the downfall of the company. Raj objects by saying that he didn't sexually assault Sonia, but his colleagues and Rakesh don't believe him. During breakfast the following day, Raj’s friend Ram advises him to resign despite believing him, thinking society would not believe Raj and it would be difficult for him to win if he files a case against Sonia. Priya finds the resignation letter in Raj's jacket pocket, and when Raj explains why he is resigning, she protests since the lie will be assumed as the truth if he does. Raj then decides to take his case to court, gaining media attention. Advocate Ravi Patel tries to humiliate Raj by revealing past drunken comments from a party held after the promotions and showing scratches on his back to paint him as guilty of attempting to rape Sonia. Despite the pressure, Raj stands firm.

A breakthrough comes when Raj’s bank manager returns with a tape from the defective handset that recorded Raj’s visit to Sonia. Ram submits the tape, but Sonia orchestrates an accident that injures him and has the tape swapped for a fake one. Priya overhears a call where Sonia demands Raj meet her to make the case disappear, but she decides to confront Sonia instead.

Priya takes over as Raj’s lawyer, revealing Sonia past relationship with Raj and playing a voicemail from Rakesh that reveals her manipulations. It is revealed that Sonia only married Ranjit for money and power, but sought to rekindle her relationship with Raj when her marriage didn’t satisfy her. In the end, Priya wins the case and Raj's name is cleared. Ranjit divorces Sonia, after which she commits suicide out of guilt by jumping from her office building. Later, Raj and Priya happily walk with their newborn child.

== Cast ==
The cast is listed below:

- Akshay Kumar as Raj Malhotra, a product engineer at Voice Mobiles and a member of its board of directors. He is Priya’s husband and Sonia’s ex lover and attempted rape victim.
- Priyanka Chopra as Sonia Roy née Kapoor, the third wife of Ranjit Roy and Raj’s ex lover who schemes to enact her revenge by framing him for sexual assault after the pair broke up five years ago.
- Kareena Kapoor as Advocate Priya Raj Malhotra, a junior lawyer and Raj’s wife. She becomes his permanent lawyer to help Raj fight his false sexual assault case when he is framed by Sonia.
- Amrish Puri as Ranjit Roy, the chairman of Voice Mobiles and Raj’s boss. He demands Raj’s resignation after Sonia frames him for sexual assault.
- Annu Kapoor as Barrister Ram Chotrani, Raj and Priya’s lawyer friend who helps them try to close Raj’s false sexual assault case.
- Paresh Rawal as Advocate Ravi Patel, Sonia’s lawyer
- Upasana Singh as Kanchan Chotrani
- Dinesh Lamba as Garv
- Preeti Puri as Jenny, Raj’s secretary
- Anil Nagrath as Judge Anupam Choudhary

== Production ==
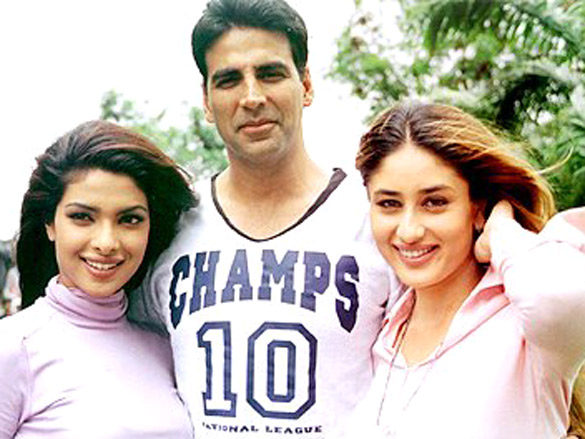
The cast of Aitraaz photographed on the sets

The director duo Abbas–Mustan took inspiration from National Basketball Association player Kobe Bryant, who was accused of rape by a fan; they began developing the film after reading about his sexual-assault case in the newspapers. Regarding the film's unusual title, they said the word aitraaz was colloquial and suited the subject. Shyam Goel and Shiraz Ahmed wrote the screenplay. Hussain A. Burmawala and R. Verman were responsible for film editing and art direction, respectively.

The film was announced in October 2003 by producer Subhash Ghai, to commemorate the 25th anniversary of his production company Mukta Arts. The media reported that Akshay Kumar, Kareena Kapoor and Priyanka Chopra were cast in lead roles, making it the third film collaboration between Kumar and Chopra after the highly successful Andaaz (2003) and Mujhse Shaadi Karogi (2004). Kumar was cast as Raj, a working man accused of rape at his workplace; Kapoor portrayed his supportive wife, who goes to extremes to defend him. According to the directors, Kumar was cast against type; he generally played action heroes, and they wanted him to underplay his character. Abbas–Mustan, known for stylish thrillers and intriguing antagonists, (Note: Examples include Shah Rukh Khan in 1993's Baazigar, Arbaaz Khan in 1996's Daraar, Akshay Kumar 2001's Ajnabee and Akshaye Khanna in 2002's Humraaz.) cast Chopra in her first negative role. She plays a woman, married to a business magnate more than twice her age, who seeks revenge by falsely accusing her former lover of raping her. Chopra was initially apprehensive about such a bold character, due to the controversial theme of sexual harassment, but Abbas–Mastan and Subhash Ghai convinced her to accept the role. The director duo had previously offered her the lead in their 2002 thriller Humraaz, which she could not accept.

Kumar described his character as "realistic" and a "new-age metrosexual" man. The actor revealed that he enjoyed the strengths and weaknesses of his character, adding "[he] is not afraid to show his feelings and does not feel emasculated by his situation." Kumar further stated: "There's a quiet dignity and heroism associated with my character. He doesn't fight for applause. He fights for his convictions." In an interview with The Tribune, Kapoor remarked that Indian women would identify with her character. She said her character "stand[s] by [Raj] in his moment of distress and helplessness, like every Indian woman would." Chopra described her character Sonia as "charming and focused", commenting that her "philosophy is that she has to achieve her goals at any cost. She knows one thing: that nothing can come in between her desires and herself." Owing to her conservative upbringing, Chopra found it difficult to identify with her "man-eater role". Playing an "extremely negative character" proved a challenge, and she had to mentally prepare herself for an hour before each scene.

Manish Malhotra and Vikram Phadnis designed the costumes and the cinematography was handled by Ravi Yadav. The film was mainly shot in Cape Town, Goa, Pune and Mumbai. Chopra, who was simultaneously filming four other productions, revealed that because of her busy schedule the producers of her other films had to move their sets to the Filmistan Studio, where Aitraaz was being made. She wept during filming of the sexual-harassment scene; it took the directors several hours to remind her she was only playing a character, and further filming was postponed. The music video of the title track "Aitraaz – I Want to Make Love to You" with Kumar and Chopra was shot in one take with a Steadicam. Salim–Sulaiman composed the background score for the film.

== Soundtrack ==
Aitraaz

Soundtrack album by Himesh Reshammiya
- Released: 24 September 2004
- Recorded: 2004
- Venue: Mumbai
- Genre: Feature film soundtrack
- Length: 71:41
- Language: Hindi
- Labels: Sony Music; Sony BMG; Tips Music Films
- Producer: Himesh Reshammiya

Himesh Reshammiya chronology
Shukriya (2004)	Aitraaz (2004)	Aabra Ka Daabra (2004)

Aitraaz's soundtrack was composed by Himesh Reshammiya, with lyrics by Sameer. The album contains fifteen songs: seven original, and eight remixes. The vocals were performed by Udit Narayan, Alka Yagnik, Sunidhi Chauhan, Adnan Sami, K.K., and Alisha Chinai. It was released on 24 September 2004 by Sony Music India.

The soundtrack was generally well received by music critics, who praised its lyrics and vocals. Joginder Tuteja of Bollywood Hungama rated the album 3 out of 5, praising "I Want To Make Love To You" (all three versions): "Sunidhi Chauhan is excellent in this wonderfully-composed track that shocks everyone with the intensity of the lyrics and the music". He concluded, "Except for two or three average songs here and there, the majority of songs in Aitraaz do keep you engaged".

All lyrics are written by Sameer; all music is composed by Himesh Reshammiya.

Track listing
No.	Title	Singer(s)	Length
1.	"Aankhen Bandh Karke"	Udit Narayan, Alka Yagnik	4:41
2.	"Talatum Talatum"	Alka Yagnik, Jayesh Gandhi, Udit Narayan	6:58
3.	"Woh Tassavur Ka Aalam"	Udit Narayan, Alka Yagnik	5:24
4.	"Nazar Aa Raha Hai"	Udit Narayan, Alka Yagnik	5:07
5.	"Gela Gela Gela"	Adnan Sami, Sunidhi Chauhan	4:42
6.	"I Want to Make Love to You"	Sunidhi Chauhan	5:11
7.	"Yeh Dil Tumpe Aa Gaya"	K.K., Alisha Chinai	5:23
8.	"I Want to Make Love to You (Male)"	Kunal Ganjawala	5:10
9.	"Aankhen Bandh Karke (Remix)"	Udit Narayan, Alka Yagnik	5:00
10.	"Gela Gela Gela (Remix)"	Adnan Sami, Sunidhi Chauhan	4:00
11.	"Woh Tassavur Ka Aalam (Remix)"	Udit Narayan, Alka Yagnik	4:00
12.	"Talatum Talatum (Remix)"	Alka Yagnik, Jayesh Gandhi, Udit Narayan	5:00
13.	"Nazar Aa Raha Hai (Remix)"	Udit Narayan, Alka Yagnik	4:00
14.	"Yeh Dil Tumpe Aa Gaya (Remix)"	K.K., Alisha Chinai	5:00
15.	"I Want to Make Love to You (Remix)"	Sunidhi Chauhan	4:00

== Marketing and release ==
The first-look poster of the film, with the tagline "In the world of women, you either play by their rules or else ...", was received positively by critics; the film's trailers were also well received. In October 2004, exclusive footage from the film was screened to the trade experts and critics, creating a positive buzz. The film's trailers and the film's music aided its marketing.

Made on a production and marketing budget of ₹80 million, Aitraaz released on 375 screens on 12 November 2004 during the festive Diwali weekend. It clashed with three other major releases: Veer-Zaara, the coloured version of Mughal-e-Azam, and Naach. The film opened to excellent occupancy in metros and decent at other places. It was the second-best playing release of the week after Yash Chopra's Veer-Zaara. According to Box Office India, the film grossed approximately ₹45 million on its opening weekend and ₹76 million in its first week at the domestic box office. After its run, Aitraaz grossed over ₹278 million at the box office, becoming the tenth highest-grossing Bollywood film of the year. The film was deemed a commercial success.

The DVD of the film was released on 6 December 2004 across all regions in a PAL-format single disc. Distributed by Shemaroo Entertainment, it included a making-of-the-film segment and a photo gallery. The VCD version was released at the same time, and Zee Network bought the exclusive broadcast rights. Aitraaz made its Indian television premiere on 30 October 2005 on Zee Cinema. The film was remade in Kannada as Shrimathi (2011), starring Upendra, Priyanka Trivedi and Celina Jaitley.

== Critical response ==
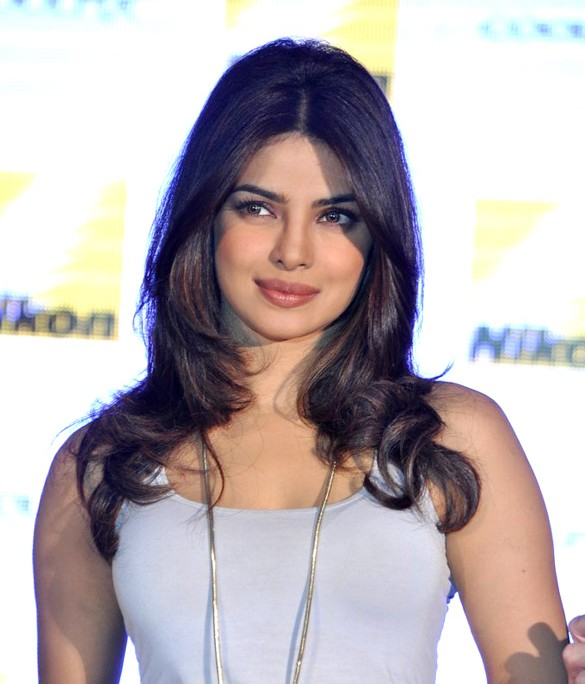
Critics were particularly appreciative of Priyanka Chopra's performance.

Aitraaz received generally positive reviews from critics, who praised its direction, music and performances, particularly Chopra's. It was noted for its bold treatment of sexual harassment. Several critics observed that the premise was similar to the American film Disclosure (1994). Writing for the BBC, critic Jay Mamtora praised the film's theme, music and performances, and remarked that "Abbas-Mustaan have done a good job in 'Indianising' the whole concept". He went on to describe it as "a gripping edge of the seat drama that keeps viewers glued to their seats". Taran Adarsh of Bollywood Hungama rated the film 3.5 out of 5, calling it "a well-crafted thriller" and complimenting the directors' opting for "a theme that has been untouched on the Indian screen so far" and the film's "dramatic moments".

Like Mamtora, Adarsh believed that the film belonged entirely to Priyanka Chopra, and was impressed with her understanding of the character, writing that "She sneaks her way through the role like an expert, drawing audience hatred the way a magnet collects iron filings." He also complimented the performances by Kapoor and Kumar. Patcy N of Rediff.com noted the film's appeal to the general public, finding its subject matter "something different from the standard fare on offer". She also praised the music and choreography. Writing for India Today, film critic Anupama Chopra lauded Chopra's "impressive" performance, and deemed the film "good timepass".

Sudhish Kamath of The Hindu commented that "though the first half of the movie is well-paced, the second half sags with the songs and twists forced into the plot to buy time", but stated that it was "passable with its slick production, a few funny lines, glam quotient and star appeal." Subhash K. Jha criticised the film's "dishy digressions" and "peripheral sub-plots", rating it 2 out of 5 overall, but was impressed with the court scene, which he considered "splendid". He also found Chopra's performance to be a triumph, remarking: "A star is born! As the predatory social-climbing seductress who can go to any length to satiate her lust for life, Priyanka Chopra rocks the scene like never before." Jha believed that Kareena was miscast and seemed a little awkward in a non-glamorous role, but "comes into her own in the climactic courtroom sequence", a sentiment echoed by Jitesh Pillai in his review for The Times of India. Pillai gave a rating of 3 out of 5 and noted that "it isn't drama that directors were striving for, yet the film works."

== Accolades ==
Award	Category	Recipient(s) and nominee(s)	Result	Ref.
Bengal Film Journalists' Association Awards	Best Actress	Priyanka Chopra	Won	
Filmfare Awards	Best Supporting Actress	Priyanka Chopra	Nominated	
Filmfare Awards	Best Performance in a Negative Role	Priyanka Chopra	Won	
Filmfare Awards	Best Actress	Kareena Kapoor	Nominated	
Global Indian Film Awards	Best Director	Abbas–Mustan	Nominated	
Global Indian Film Awards	Best Villain Female	Priyanka Chopra	Won	
International Indian Film Academy Awards	Best Actress	Kareena Kapoor	Nominated	
International Indian Film Academy Awards	Best Supporting Actor	Paresh Rawal	Nominated	
International Indian Film Academy Awards	Best Music Director	Himesh Reshamiya	Nominated	
International Indian Film Academy Awards	Best Lyricist	Sameer (for song "Woh Tassavvur")	Nominated	
International Indian Film Academy Awards	Best Male Playback	Udit Narayan (for song "Aankhen Bandh Karke")	Nominated	
International Indian Film Academy Awards	Best Female Playback	Alka Yagnik (for song "Aankhen Bandh Karke")	Nominated	
International Indian Film Academy Awards	Best Story	Shiraz Ahmed, Shyam Goel	Nominated	
International Indian Film Academy Awards	Best Editing	Hussain A. Burmawala	Won	
International Indian Film Academy Awards	Best Sound Recording	Rakesh Rajan	Won	
International Indian Film Academy Awards	Best Sound Re-Recording	Anup Dev	Won	
Producers Guild Film Awards	Best Actress in a Supporting Role	Priyanka Chopra	Nominated	
Screen Awards	Best Actor in a Negative Role	Priyanka Chopra	Won	
Screen Awards	Jodi No. 1	Akshay Kumar, Priyanka Chopra	Nominated	
Stardust Awards	Star of the Year – Male	Akshay Kumar (Note: Also for Khakee.)	Nominated	
Zee Cine Awards	Best Actor in a Negative Role	Priyanka Chopra	Nominated	
Zee Cine Awards	Best Music Director	Himesh Reshamiya	Nominated	
Zee Cine Awards	Best Lyricist	Sameer	Nominated	
