= Veer-Zaara =

2004 Indian film by Yash Chopra

- Theatrical-release poster
- Directed by: Yash Chopra
- Written by: Aditya Chopra
- Produced by: Yash Chopra; Aditya Chopra
- Starring: Shah Rukh Khan; Preity Zinta; Rani Mukerji
- Cinematography: Anil Mehta
- Edited by: Ritesh Soni
- Music by: Songs: Madan Mohan; Score: R. S. Mani; Revision: Sanjeev Kohli
- Production company: Yash Raj Films
- Distributed by: Yash Raj Films
- Release date: 12 November 2004
- Running time: 192 minutes
- Country: India
- Language: Hindi
- Budget: ₹23 crore
- Box office: ₹107 crore (including re-releases)

Veer-Zaara is a 2004 Indian Hindi-language romantic drama film directed and produced by Yash Chopra, and written and produced by his son Aditya Chopra. It stars Shah Rukh Khan and Preity Zinta as star-crossed lovers, Veer Pratap Singh, an Indian Air Force officer, and Zaara Hayaat Khan, the daughter of a Pakistani politician. Veer is imprisoned on false charges and 22 years later, Pakistani lawyer Saamiya Siddiqui (Rani Mukerji), fights his case. Divya Dutta, Boman Irani, Anupam Kher and Kirron Kher play supporting roles with Amitabh Bachchan, Hema Malini and Manoj Bajpayee making special appearances.

Chopra, dissatisfied with the scripts he received, had not made a movie in 7 years. Aditya narrated a few scenes of a story he had written, which interested Chopra and prompted him to direct his next film. Chopra intended the film to be a tribute to Punjab titled Yeh Kahaan Aa Gaye Hum, based on an eponymous song from his 1981 film Silsila. Set in India and Pakistan, principal photography took place in Indian Punjab and in Mumbai; parts of the film were also shot in Pakistan. The soundtrack album, based on old compositions by Madan Mohan with lyrics by Javed Akhtar, was the highest-selling album of the year in India. R.S. Mani composed the background score.

Veer-Zaara was released on 12 November 2004 during Diwali. The film earned over ₹97 crore worldwide in its first run, becoming the highest-grossing Indian film of the year. It received universal acclaim, especially for its story, dialogues, soundtrack, performances and sensitive portrayal of India-Pakistan relations. It was described by analysts as having themes pertaining to a shared Punjabi culture, secularism and feminism, among others. Veer-Zaara is ranked among the all-time great romantic films of Indian cinema. The film competed with the Akshay Kumar-starrer Aitraaz (2004), which was also a box-office success.

At the 52nd National Film Awards, Veer-Zaara won Best Popular Film Providing Wholesome Entertainment. At the 50th Filmfare Awards, the film received a leading 15 nominations, and won 4 awards, including Best Film and Best Story (Aditya). At the 6th IIFA Awards, it won a leading 7 awards of its 11 nominations, including Best Film, Best Director (Chopra), Best Actor (Khan), Best Supporting Actress (Mukerji) and Best Music Director (Mohan).

== Plot ==
The government of Pakistan decides to reopen the cases of former Indian prisoners. Saamiya Siddiqui (Rani Mukerji) fights her first case to repatriate Indian Air Force Squadron Leader Veer Pratap Singh (Shahrukh Khan). Veer Pratap Singh has been imprisoned for 22 years under the alias Rajesh Rathore. Saamiya addresses him by his real name. Veer tells his story.

Veer was a squadron leader in the Indian Air Force. Zaara (Preity Zinta) the daughter of Jahangir Hayaat Khan (Boman Irani), a powerful Pakistani politician, is traveling to Kiratpur Sahib to immerse her nanny's ashes. Zaara's bus crashes and she is rescued by Veer. Having fallen in love with her Veer asks Zaara for a day of her life. Veer takes her to his village and introduces her to his adoptive parents Chaudhary Sumer Singh (Amitabh Bachchan), and mother (Hema Malini). Zaara stays there for Lohri.

At the railway station where Zaara's fiancé, Razaa Shirazi (Manoj Bajpayee) has come to fetch Zaara Veer reveals his true feelings to Zaara. Veer and Zaara part ways.

On the day of her engagement Zaara tells her mother (Kirron Kher) that she too loves Veer but her mother insists Zaara marry Razaa. After her engagement, Zaara begins seeing Veer everywhere. Her friend Shabbo (Divya Dutta) calls up Veer. Veer visits Pakistan. Seeing Zaara embrace Veer in front of her entire family, her father suffers a heart attack. Zaara's mother pleads with Veer to leave Zaara.

Veer relents but is arrested by the police who accuse him of being an agent of India's Research and Analysis Wing. Veer discover that this is a ploy hatched by Razaa. When Razaa threatens to harass Zaara Veer agrees to Raaza's proposal to admit that he is secret agent Rajesh Rathore. On the day of Zara-Raaza's wedding, the bus in which Veer is supposed to be returning to India has an accident.

Having heard the story Saamiya travels to Veer's village. His adoptive parents are dead. She meets Zaara and Shabbo. Upon hearing of the bus accident and assuming Veer is dead Zaara had broken off her marriage and moved here. Saamiya reveals the truth to Zaara. They travel back to Pakistan with evidence that Veer was not a secret agent. Veer wins the case. Veer recites the poem "Main Qaidi No. 786." Saamiya drops Veer and Zaara off at the Wagah border. Veer and Zaara go back to Veer's village.

== Cast ==
- Shah Rukh Khan as Veer Pratap Singh
- Preity Zinta as Zaara Hayaat Khan
- Rani Mukerji as Saamiya Siddiqui
- Divya Dutta as Shabina "Shabbo" Ibrahim, Zaara's friend
- Kirron Kher as Mariam Hayaat Khan, Zaara's mother
- Boman Irani as Jahangir Haayat Khan, Zaara's father
- Anupam Kher as Zakir Ahmed
- Zohra Sehgal as Zahida "Bebe" Hayaat Khan
- S. M. Zaheer as Pakistani Judge
- Tom Alter as Dr. Yusuf
- Akhilendra Mishra as Jailer Majid Khan
- Arun Bali as Abdul Shirazi Khan
- Rushad Rana as Sahir

Special appearances

- Amitabh Bachchan as Chaudhary Sumer Singh, Veer's foster father
- Hema Malini as Saraswati Kaur, Veer's foster mother
- Manoj Bajpayee as Razaa Shirazi, Zaara's fiancee

== Production ==
=== Development ===
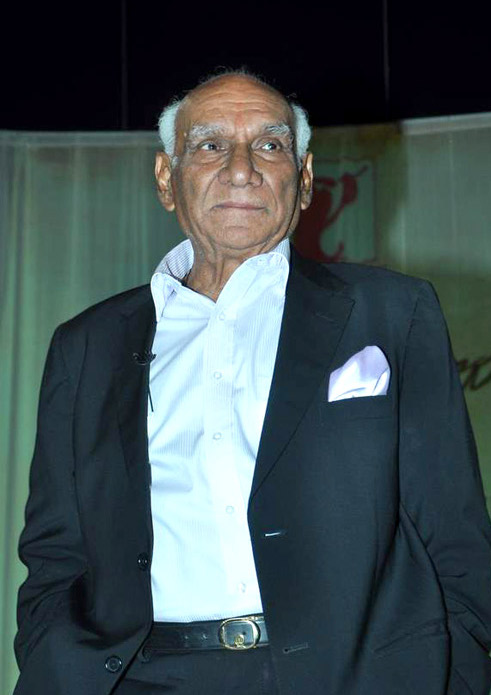
Chopra (pictured) made his return to direction after 7 years with Veer-Zaara.

Yash Chopra was due to return to directing after 7 years since Dil To Pagal Hai (1997). After his son Aditya completed filming for Mohabbatein (2000), they started to look for a new script for Chopra's return as a director. None of the new scripts excited Chopra; he expressed his disdain at the new trend of the films of the time, stating, "I was tired of television promos. All the semi-clad girls look the same." Chopra stated he was as nervous of his return as he was while directing his debut Dhool Ka Phool (1959). He then finalised another script and began casting for roles. Aditya then provided a narration of a few scenes of a new script, but conveyed that he would be unable to direct it. Chopra was interested and began to work on the new project.

According to Aditya, the story of Veer-Zaara was written as a medium for his father to return to his Punjabi roots. Chopra was born in Lahore, Punjab (present-day Pakistan) and later moved with his family to Jalandhar when he was young. He travelled to Bombay (present-day Mumbai) in 1951, when he was introduced to the film industry. Speaking about the film's theme, Chopra said, "Veer-Zaara is a humble tribute to my home in Punjab. It is my tribute to the oneness of people on both sides of the border." In preparation, Chopra watched videos of Pakistani marriages and consulted Nasreen Rehman, a professor of the Cambridge University for the film's portrayal of Pakistani culture, their courts and dialects.

While completing the film, Chopra and Aditya had a discussion about the film's title. Yeh Kahaan Aa Gaye Hum, the title of a song from Chopra's Silsila (1981), was one of the contenders, but Veer-Zaara was ultimately chosen. Chopra said, "The film's lovers are not bothered with the strife around them. For them, love is the only religion." The title Veer-Zaara was initially hinted to mislead audiences, but was officially confirmed by Sanjeev Kohli, CEO of Yash Raj Films, who stated that the title was chosen after "much deliberation". Chopra stated that he used to have constant arguments with Aditya while filming Veer-Zaara.

=== Cast and crew ===
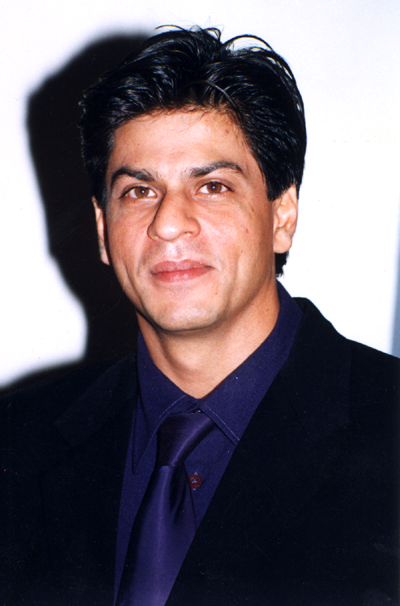
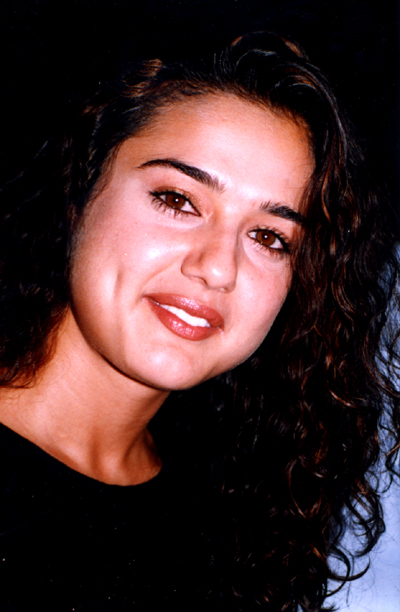
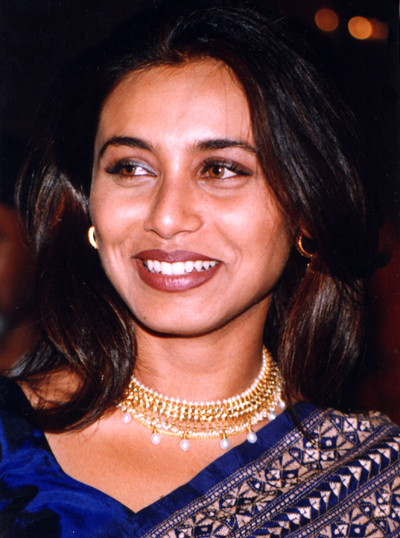
Shah Rukh Khan, and Preity Zinta, were cast as the eponymous star-crossed lovers, and Rani Mukerji, as the lawyer.

Shah Rukh Khan was cast in the lead role of Veer. Khan shortly played a 60-year-old man in the film, which he felt was a difficult role for him.

Kajol was the original first choice for the title role of Zaara, but she turned it down due to her pregnancy. The role then went to Preity Zinta. Zinta was interested in being a part of the film due to Chopra's finesse as a director. She also felt that it was time to move on from war-oriented films with Pakistan, saying, "I thought that was a great message to have in a film and I think what our governments can't do... what our government cannot do, our cinema can do and this film is truly doing that." Zinta had to attend various lessons for improving her diction for speaking Urdu. Though excited at first, she later "got knots in her stomach" worrying about her performance, but Chopra assured her.

Based on the Pakistani human rights activist Asma Jehangir, the role of Saamiya Siddiqui was initially offered to Aishwarya Rai Bachchan and Pakistani actress Nadia Jamil, but upon their refusal, it went to Rani Mukherji. Amitabh Bachchan and Hema Malini were cast as Veer's foster parents. This marked the first time Bachchan was directed by Chopra after Silsila (1981) and Malini's reunion with the director after Vijay (1988). Manoj Bajpayee was cast as Zaara's fiancé, a role which was originally offered to Ajay Devgn. In 2017, while promoting Aiyaary, Bajpayee revealed that Chopra used to often worry about the film's possible failure. Real-life couple Anupam Kher and Kirron Kher appear in the film as Saamiya's mentor and Zaara's mother respectively, though they do not share the same frame. Other cast members included Divya Dutta, Zohra Sehgal, Akhilendra Mishra, and Tom Alter. Chopra denied the existence of a rivalry between the co-actors in the film, when asked about it in an interview with The Quint.

In addition to writing the story and script, Aditya co-produced the film along with his father under the Yash Raj Films banner. The film's costumes were handled by Manish Malhotra. Khan's costumes were specifically designed by Karan Johar. Mandira Shukla was the film's costume designer. Anil Mehta, the cinematographer, was requested by Chopra to give the scenes a feel of olden times, in contrast with other films of the time like Kal Ho Naa Ho (2003). Sharmishta Roy, who had worked on Johar's Kabhi Khushi Kabhie Gham (2001), was chosen as the art director. Saroj Khan and Vaibhavi Merchant were the choreographers. Allan Amin was the action director.

=== Filming ===
In October 2004, Rediff.com published an exclusive "On The Sets" report for Veer-Zaara. The website reported that the cast members wore expensive costumes, one being Zinta, who wore a fluorescent green lungi outfit; Khan was late for the shot. Parts of the film were shot in various locations in Mumbai. In 2004, the National Geographic reported that a folk festival sequence was being shot in Film City, Mumbai. A set that represented Punjab was created and Sikh dancers were brought in, whom, according to the report, look like peacocks due to their colorful turbans. All scenes which featured Khan in a prison were shot in a single day, at a jail in Pakistan. The court scenes were shot in a Pakistani law court.

While filming for an action sequence with Khan, Zinta had a near-fatal experience when she was hanging from a harness for nearly six hours. Zinta labeled it "one of the most humbling experiences of [her] life" and stated that it made her realise the difficulties male actors have to go through. For a sequence involving Khan's character calling Mukherji's character 'daughter', over 10 retakes were taken, and a pack-up was also announced by an "infuriated" Chopra, according to Khan. According to Mukherji, Chopra usually used to highly consciously avoid retakes as they would make the actors "mechanical".

Veer-Zaara was filmed entirely in sync sound. Khan stated that although he did not have to dub lines for the film separately, he did dub a few dialogues for the film. Saif Ali Khan's palace in Pataudi served as Zaara's mansion. A shoot was carried out in Punjab during a particular season, after which the indoor shooting was completed. Most of the filming was done in secrecy and no official announcements were made. Initially planned over a period of 102 days, the film's shoot was completed in 72 days. The film's reel length was 17757.61 ft (5412.52 m).

== Analysis ==
In her book Violent Belongings: Partition, Gender and National Culture in Postcolonial India, Kavita Daiya, associate professor of English at the Columbian College of Arts and Sciences feels that Zaara represents secularism in Pakistan. She refers to the encounter between Zaara and Choudhary Sumer Singh, where Zaara persuades Singh to promote women's education as an instance of the theme. Daiya notes that no person faces animosity by being either Indian or Pakistani in the film. Meenakshi Bharat and Nirmal Kumar, authors of the book Filming the Line of Control: The Indo–Pak Relationship through the Cinematic Lens, concur with Daiya and feels this shows maturity on Chopra's part, who ignores the issue of Jammu and Kashmir and was able to "overcome the phobia of Pakistan" usually present in Indian films. They compare it to Chopra's earlier films, where "hate-filled encounters" are generally avoided. Philip Lutgendorf agrees and also notes the influence of Sufi tradition, where Veer's ultimate reward is union with Allah, much like a Sufi pir. Kush Varia, author of the book Bollywood: Gods, Glamour, and Gossip, whilst agreeing with Bharat and Kumar about Chopra, notes that the lovers are reunited as compared to Chopra's earlier romances, where they remain separated.

Daiya establishes that Veer's "Indian masculinity" is shown through his sacrifice of spending 22 years in jail. Nandini Bhattacharya, author of the book Hindi Cinema: Repeating the Subject, differs and instead feels that Veer's character is "partially feminized"–"men are meant to be captors, not captives." Sangita Gopal, associate professor of English at the University of Oregon and author of the book Conjugations: Marriage and Form in New Bollywood Cinema, notes that Veer's identity dies after 22 years and even after reuniting with Zaara, they are too old to reproduce. She perceives this as the transition from "living death to fruitless life". Daiya feels that the Punjabi village in Veer-Zaara acts as a model for India, and Zaara's positive to a song describing India, feeling similarities with Pakistan, exposes an incomplete "utopian" affiliation between the two lovers. Daiya further feels that Veer's poem challenges the differences between the nations of India and Pakistan and establishes resemblance between the nations and citizens. Varia too agrees that the shared heritage of the Punjabis is one of the film's themes, explored in the song "Aisa Des Hai Mera".

Bharat and Kumar feel that Veer-Zaara and Main Hoon Na (2004), also starring Khan, accepts Pakistan's status as a separate entity from India. Rajinder Dudrah, senior lecturer at the University of Manchester, contrasts Veer-Zaara with Main Hoon Na, writing that while the former "explores the pleasures and trials of border crossing", the latter "extols the virtues of overcoming the border through diplomacy and personal actions." He notes that they show different depictions of borders that the protagonists need to overcome. He feels that the central aestic pleasures of the films, especially Veer-Zaara, is the emphasis on border crossing as a "potentially radical act". Bharat and Kumar also compare Henna (1991) with Veer-Zaara; they say that the "urbane, educated, professional characters" of Veer-Zaara replace Henna's village people referring to "religion straight from the heart" and "responding to [Pakistan] in an unencumbered manner." Henna's brother died in helping Chander across the border; this is contrasted with Saamiya helping Veer in court. Dudrah notes that the ease with which the protagonists move across borders without going through legal procedurings could be a source of criticism.

Gopal feels that the film's dual time and use of old music was the reason for its appeal to masses and its commercial success. She compares the last segment of the title song in which Zaara is shot to the climax of Mani Ratnam's Dil Se.. (1998); both films suggest that the lovers cannot be united. She also feels that the extended ending with the song "Tere Liye" was for a realistic approach. In her book Dreaming in Canadian: South Asian Youth, Bollywood, and Belonging, Faiza Hirji feels that cultural and religious differences were not acknowledged in the film, while noting Pakistani and Muslim traditions were highlighted. She felt that the universality of the maternal habit was highlighted in a sequence between Zaara's mother and Veer. She contrasts the love to Bombay (1995), where religion is an obstacle to love, which is not the case in Veer-Zaara. Comparing the film with Gadar: Ek Prem Katha (2001), Rini Bhattacharya Mehta and Rajeshwari V. Pandharipande (authors of the book Bollywood and Globalization: Indian Popular Cinema, Nation, and Diaspora) state that while Veer-Zaara manipulates the state's critique to make it appear "progressive" at first glance, Gadar does not. Both Gadar and Veer-Zaara feature a double recovery; only that the latter adopts "similarly duplicitous modes of writing political structures as individual destined whose triumph over nation-state politics drives aground more completely any redemptive plot of neighborly understanding". Bhattacharya agrees and also equates it with Gadar and others like Mother India (1957), where the "identity of the normative citizen" is established.

== Music ==
Veer-Zaara's soundtrack features 11 songs with music based on old and untouched compositions by the late Madan Mohan, as revised by his son Sanjeev Kohli. The vocals are provided by Lata Mangeshkar, Jagjit Singh, Udit Narayan, Sonu Nigam, Gurdas Mann, Roop Kumar Rathod, Ahmed and Mohammed Hussain and Pritha Mazumder. The lyrics were written by Javed Akhtar. The soundtrack was released by YRF Music on 18 September 2004.

Mohan was nominated for the Best Music Director at the 50th Filmfare Awards, and won the Best Music Director at the 6th IIFA Awards. Akhtar got nominated for the Best Lyricist at the 50th Filmfare Awards for "Aisa Des Hai Mera", "Main Yahaan Hoon" and "Tere Liye", winning for "Tere Liye"; he also received a nomination for the IIFA Award for Best Lyricist for "Tere Liye". It was the highest-selling music album of the year in India, with sales of around 3 million units.

== Release ==
=== Theatrical ===
Veer-Zaara was released on 12 November 2004 and promoted with the tagline, "A Love Legend". A special screening was conducted in Punjab, Pakistan for Pakistani audiences. Apart from that, it was screened at the Berlin Film Festival, where it received high critical acclaim.

On 26 April 2006, Veer-Zaara had its French premiere at The Grand Rex, the biggest theatre in Paris. It is the first Indian film to premiere in such a large and luxe venue. It was released in 60 prints in the United Kingdom, and in the United States in 88 prints. In 2017, Veer-Zaara was restrained at the Best of Indian film series in the United States.

=== Home media ===
On 6 June 2005, Yash Raj Films released the DVD of Veer-Zaara. The film was released on Blu-ray in December 2009. In September 2007, a book based on the making of the film, titled They Said It... The Memoirs of a Love Legend Yash Chopra's Veer-Zaara, was released. The book contains testimonials from members of the film's cast and crew and follows the production stages of the film. The film was also made available to stream on Amazon Prime Video and Netflix.

== Reception ==
=== Box office ===
Prior to the film's release, Adarsh predicted that the film would be a commercial success. It was released in 625 screens in India and grossed ₹24.6 million nett on its opening day, the year's second highest-opening for a film in India. Veer-Zaara topped the week's highest-grossing films in India in the first week, grossing an average of ₹6,85,948 per print. It earned ₹175.7 million nett in its first week, the highest first week collection of an Indian film.

Since its release, it topped the weekly charts 39 times in India. It also had the highest weekend collection of the year, earning ₹97.8 million over the weekend. The film remained at the first position in its second week of release, grossing an average of ₹1,89,502 per print. At the end of its theatrical run, it collected ₹580 million in India, becoming the highest-grossing film of the year.

The film earned ₹357 million in the international markets—₹152.5 million from the United Kingdom, ₹140 million from the United States and ₹65 million from other territories—making it 2004's highest-grossing Indian production overseas. In its first week in the United Kingdom, the film collected $900,000, for the fourth position on the local box office chart. The film collected the same amount in North America, 15th on the local box office chart. The film was a blockbuster, with regard to its overseas collection. Veer-Zaara grossed a total of ₹976.4 million (US$10 million) worldwide, becoming the highest grossing Indian film of the year.

=== Critical response ===
Veer-Zaara was highly acclaimed by critics, who praised the film's story, screenplay, dialogues, music, performances and sensitive portrayal of India-Pakistan relations.

On the review aggregator website Rotten Tomatoes, 92% of 12 critics' reviews are positive, with an average rating of 7.8/10. On Metacritic, which assigns a weighted average to films, it has a score of 67 based on five critics, indicating "generally favorable reviews". The film featured in the British Film Institute's list of 10 Great Bollywood Romances, with commentary by Rachel Dwyer. Dwyer feels that the film represents the "much-shared culture and history" of the Punjab. She writes, "Their dramatization in the film shows Chopra’s skill with film and music."

==== India ====
Taran Adarsh of Bollywood Hungama gave it 4.5 stars out of five and comments, "There's romance, there's a strong dose of emotions, there're songs aplenty, there's drama... But, most important, it has soul, which has been lacking in most movies of late". Writing for India Today, Kaveree Bamzai gave a positive review and compliments Khan's performance, writing, "Khan strides across Aditya Chopra's screenplay with assured ease." Subhash K. Jha gave Veer-Zaara a positive review for Indo-Asian News Service, praising the performances of the leads as "old yet passionate, frail yet sublime" and writes, "The surge of love between two people belonging to entirely different cultures and lands is collected into a quaint and quivering collage of memory and melody."

Jitesh Pillai of The Times of India rates it 3.5 stars out of five, crediting Aditya's writing and its execution. He writes, "Yash Chopra's Veer-Zaara may be woefully long and meandering. But... this one works and grabs us where it matters. VZ is one from the heart." Also writing for Times of India, Nishtha Bhatnagar called it a "must-watch". Deepu Madhavan of NDTV praised the execution of the plot and writes, "the love story of Squadron Leader Veer Pratap Singh and Zaara Hayaat Khan is an ode to ageless romance and timeless love." Avijit Ghosh gave the film 7/10 in The Telegraph and writes, "The film works because the stars shine. Preity's Zaara is both restrained and dignified. This is her most nuanced performance to date." He criticised the film's length and excessive use of Punjabi, but finally writes, "We have an honest-to-the-heart film that remarkably bypasses the bitterness of Indo-Pak relations in a cross-border love story... Veer-Zaara is for all seasons and every reason." Namrata Joshi of Outlook described it as "a good-hearted film wherein the underlying theme is the all-embracing goodness of 'people'."

Chitra Mahesh of The Hindu writes, "Veer-Zaara is inordinately long and sentimental. Certain things like fabulous camera work, art direction, and sensuousness of the moods, are a given. And you would overlook the cliches simply because there are such good performances, especially from Zinta and Mukherji," while also appreciating that Khan "looks good and performs most creditably." Vinayak Chakraborty of Hindustan Times, concurring with Mahesh, wrote that the movie "sticks to all the clichés that the Chopra camp has peddled down the ages," but concluded that it had "a strong script, good performances, and solid direction." Sukanya Varma of Rediff.com criticised Chopra for repeating content from his previous films, while appreciating the performances and finally writes, "if you are a fan of the Chopra factory of filmmaking and looking for plenty of eye-candy, Veer-Zaara promises to make your Diwali a happy one." In another review for The Times of India, Teena Malik heavily criticised it in agreement with Verma for repetition of content, and labelled the film "horrifying".

==== International ====
Anita Gates of New York Times writes that Veer-Zaara "would be embraced as fabulously trashy" had it been an American film but credits the cultural impact, writing, "the cultural assumptions of Veer and Zaara add a welcome element of freshness for American audiences. When Zaara's mother reminds her daughter that women always love fully, with heart and soul, she casually adds, "Men don't have the strength to love like that." Derek Elley of Variety observes that while it does not have "technique and production sheen" as recent Hindi films, Veer-Zaara's "in-depth star casting and thorough entertainment values" make it a "must-see" for Indian filmgoers. Maitland McDonagh of TV Guide wrote, "Though Chopra's film is emotionally extravagant even by the standards of India's epically unrestrained cinema, the star-crossed lovers bear the weighty metaphorical significance of their travails surprisingly lightly, particularly Zinta's radiantly lovely Zaara." Jonathan Curiel of San Francisco Chronicle was particularly fond of the film, finding the movie experience "so arresting, its scenes so full of beauty and colors, that the three hours go by almost too fast". He further noted that unlike other Hindi films, it deserves a wider audience for portraying "the humanity in characters who represent 'the other'", done "in a way that's dramatic, funny, fun, silly, musical, stylish, romantic and redemptive".

Carrie R. Wheadon of Common Sense Media gives it four stars out of five and rates it as 11+, writing, "Those who watch can't miss the pleas for understanding and peace between India and Pakistan or the film's strong support of equality for women." She compliments the picturization of the songs, opening, "Even the slower love songs will hold viewers, especially as Zaara dreams about seeing Veer everywhere while she prepares for her wedding." Manish Gajjar of BBC commented, "Veer-Zaara has a great storyline with some unpredictable twists and emotions, keeping you engrossed throughout."

== Re-releases ==
Subsequent re-releases from 2004 to 2023 added ₹3 crore, pushing its lifetime gross over ₹100 crore mark. Further, it turned out to be a huge success during its re-release in India in the month of September 2024, where it grossed around ₹3.75 crore.

An extended version of Veer-Zaara was released on 600 screens in international markets. The film performed very well and raked over US$305K (₹2.55 crore) overseas, taking the total worldwide gross box office collections, including all the theatrical runs to ₹1.07 billion.

== See also ==
- List of accolades received by Veer-Zaara
- List of films set in Lahore
