= Mujhse Shaadi Karogi =

2004 Indian film by David Dhawan

- Theatrical release poster
- Directed by: David Dhawan
- Written by: Anees Bazmee
- Screenplay by: Rumi Jaffery
- Produced by: Sajid Nadiadwala
- Starring: Salman Khan; Akshay Kumar; Priyanka Chopra
- Cinematography: Sanjay F. Gupta
- Edited by: Nitin Rokade
- Music by: Songs: Sajid–Wajid; Anu Malik; Score: Salim–Sulaiman
- Production company: Nadiadwala Grandson Entertainment
- Distributed by: Nadiadwala Grandson Entertainment
- Release date: 30 July 2004
- Running time: 161 minutes
- Country: India
- Language: Hindi
- Budget: ₹15 crore
- Box office: ₹56 crore

Mujhse Shaadi Karogi (transl. Will You Marry Me?) is a 2004 Indian Hindi-language romantic comedy film directed by David Dhawan and produced by Sajid Nadiadwala. The film stars Salman Khan, Akshay Kumar and Priyanka Chopra with Amrish Puri, Kader Khan, Satish Shah and Rajpal Yadav in supporting roles. Set primarily in Goa, it follows the adventures of two men (Salman and Kumar) who try to win a woman's (Chopra) heart.

Wanting to re-invent himself, Dhawan decided to make a film that would deviate from his signature mass-market comedies in look and feel, approaching it as a romantic comedy. The script was written by Dhawan's longtime collaborators Anees Bazmee and Rumi Jaffery. Although the film is set in Goa, it was not shot there. Instead, principal photography was done on two detailed sets created by Sharmishta Roy in Film City and Mauritius. Additionally, several scenes and songs were filmed on location in Mauritius.

Mujhse Shaadi Karogi was released on 30 July 2004. With a box-office gross of ₹565 million, the film became the fourth-highest-grossing Indian film of the year. Mujhse Shaadi Karogi was nominated for three Filmfare Awards. The film received a leading 13 nominations at the 6th IIFA Awards, including Best Film, Best Director (Dhawan), Best Actor (Khan) and Best Actress (Chopra), winning five awards. It received 10 Screen Awards nominations, including Best Film. The film was remade in Kannada as Swayamvara (2010).

== Plot ==
Sameer Malhotra is ill-tempered and has anger-management issues since his parents died during his childhood. The only person who could calm down his temper was his best friend, Arun. When he beats up a group of goons who tried to assault his girlfriend Roma, she breaks up with him because of his temper. According to his horoscope, Sameer is unlucky in love. To escape further similar issues, he becomes a lifeguard in Goa.

On the train, Sameer's co-passenger Suraj makes him think that he is a thief by asking him where he keeps important things (like money) in his luggage. Sameer stays awake all night to avoid being robbed, while Suraj sleeps after conning Sameer into guarding his luggage. Suraj admits this to Sameer the next morning at the station. Sameer learns that Suraj is a security guard at his resort and puts him on night guard duty for three months. This puts a crimp in Suraj's marriage, and, although he apologises, Sameer is adamant.

Sameer meets his next door neighbour Rani, an up-and-coming fashion designer, and falls in love with her. After a rough start with her father, Jugraj Singh, a former colonel, Rani and Sameer become friends. Sameer's bad luck comes into play; he disagrees with Singh, and Rani becomes angry with him when she overhears him saying bad things about her to Pandit Raj Purohit Jyotshi, an astrologer.

Trouble arrives in the form of Sunny, who shares a room with Sameer. He meets Rani, falls in love with her, and decides to capitalise on Sameer's mistakes. This causes friction between the roommates. Sameer anonymously gives Rani the money she needs for a fashion competition, calling himself her "well-wisher." Rani wins the competition and wants to thank her "well wisher" in person. Sameer, who gave Rani the money he had saved for his grandmother's eye surgery and his sister's wedding, goes to meet her, but Sunny gets there first, claims to be the well-wisher, and takes her away. Sameer follows on his motorcycle and accidentally injures Singh. Sunny, who takes credit for a painting of Rani by Sameer, kidnaps her dog Tommy and frames Sameer. Sameer buys an identical dog and tells Singh that he has found Tommy. He is exposed when the dog bites Singh and runs away after he gives it a cold bath.

Although Sameer is angry, he reconciles with Rani with the help of a magician at a New Year's Eve party. Sunny places a bar dancer in Sameer's room one morning; Rani, who went there to invite him for breakfast, sees the dancer sleeping there and assumes that they had sex. She is also horrified that Sameer is now the leader of the Eagle Gang, a group of bikers who roam the streets of Goa and cause trouble.

Sameer makes another attempt to apologise. When he goes to Rani's house, he is surprised to see Suraj; Suraj is Rani's uncle, who now knows that he loves her. Sameer apologises and takes Suraj off night duty. Sameer's partially blind grandmother Pushpa mistakes Rani's mother for Rani and tries to persuade her to marry Sameer. Rani's mother tells her daughter to carefully consider whom she loves more: Sameer or Sunny.

Sameer decides to leave Goa, and Sunny tells him that he got close to Rani through Sameer's mistakes. Sameer says that he has had enough dreaming and wishes Sunny happiness. Sunny taunts Sameer again, and Sameer loses his temper. He chases Sunny through the crowd at a cricket stadium where India and Pakistan are playing a friendly match. Sameer breaks through security, takes the microphone from the guest of honour Kapil Dev, and apologises to Rani and her parents. He asks her to marry him in front of the crowd, and Rani runs onto the field and embraces him, thus reuniting with him.

Sunny reveals that he is actually Arun, who came to Goa to cure Sameer's anger-management issues. He also reveals that he went to visit Sameer after returning from the United States after 19 years and met Pushpa, who told him about Sameer's heartbreak and departure to Goa. Arun decided to help Sameer by posing as his enemy, telling Rani and her parents earlier. Sameer is reunited with Arun, who conducts his and Rani's wedding.

== Cast ==
- Salman Khan as Sameer Malhotra
  - Parth Dave as Young Sameer
- Akshay Kumar as Sunny/Arun
- Priyanka Chopra as Rani Singh
- Amrish Puri as Colonel Dugraj Singh, Rani's army retired father.
- Kader Khan as O. B. Duggal, Sameer and Sunny's landlord.
- Satish Shah as Suraj Prakash, Rama's brother, Rani's uncle.
- Rajpal Yadav as Raj Purohit / Paul (dual role)
- Amrita Arora as Roma, Sameer's ex-girlfriend.
- Vindu Dara Singh as the gang leader
- Supriya Karnik as Rama Dugraj Singh, Rani's mother and Dugraj's wife.
- Shashikala as Pushpa Malhotra, Sameer's grandmother.
- Upasana Singh as Mrs. Suraj Prakash
- Rekha Rao as Duggal's wife
- Tommy as a Dog

=== Cameo appearances ===
- Shefali Jariwala as Bijili (special appearance)
- Sajid Khan as himself
- Kurush Deboo as a dog-seller
- Rajesh Vivek as Chutki Baba
- Irfan Pathan as cameo
- Javagal Srinath as cameo
- Ashish Nehra as cameo
- Harbhajan Singh as cameo
- Parthiv Patel as cameo
- Kapil Dev as cameo
- Mohammad Kaif as cameo
- Navjot Singh Sidhu as cameo

== Production ==
Known primarily for mass-market comedies, David Dhawan wanted to make Mujhse Shaadi Karogi a romantic comedy. Asked about re-inventing himself with the film, he replied: "I have changed with the times. One has to [change]. My trademark style remains unchanged in its basics. Why should I change when my style has kept me going for so many years? I will never change that." Dhawan wanted the make the film different from his earlier releases in look and feel. Anees Bazmee, who collaborated on several films with the director, returned to write its screenplay. Bazmee had adapted the story and screenplay from the 2001 Tamil film Kabadi Kabadi.

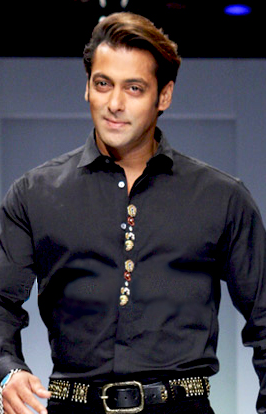
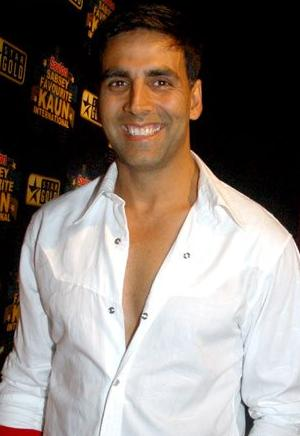
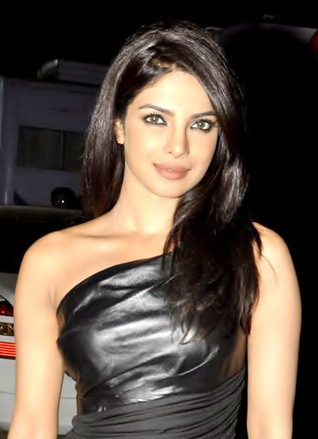
Khan, Kumar and Chopra (left to right) played the lead roles.

In a Times of India interview, Priyanka Chopra said that she had signed for Dhawan's comedy film co-starring Salman Khan and Akshay Kumar; it was the second collaboration between Kumar and Chopra, after the successful romantic musical Andaaz (2003). Chopra said that her decision was based on "the hilarious script" and Sajid Nadiadwala's reputation as a producer. She described Rani, an aspiring fashion designer, as "very innocent and gullible" and a "girl next door": "Rani gets stuck between two boys. She likes both of them and she doesn't know what to do." In an interview with Rediff.com, Kumar described his character as someone who creates many problems in Sameer's life and compared their dynamics to Tom and Jerry: "I harass him all the time."

Principal photography began in September 2003 on a set in Film City, Mumbai. Art director Sharmishta Roy created a detailed set of Goa; according to Hindustan Times, "The set had become the talk of the industry for its fine detailing." Roy built another large set in Mauritius, where the outdoor scenes, the songs and several other scenes were filmed on a month-long schedule beginning on 9 January 2004. Three hundred people made up the unit for the Mauritius schedule.

An action scene was filmed with a motion-control camera, a first in Indian cinema. Although the producers wanted to keep the film's climax (featuring several cricketers from the Indian team and filmed at a Bangalore stadium in June 2004) a secret, it was revealed in the media. Filming wrapped in July 2004.

== Soundtrack ==
Mujhse Shaadi Karogi

Soundtrack album by Sajid–Wajid
- Released: 31 May 2004
- Genre: Feature film soundtrack
- Length: 40:00
- Language: Hindi
- Label: T-Series

The soundtrack album contains eight songs, seven original songs and one remix. Six songs were composed by Sajid–Wajid and the seventh by Anu Malik. Lyrics for five songs were written by Jalees Sherwani, with one song each by Sameer and Arun Bhairav. The vocals were performed by Udit Narayan, Alka Yagnik, Sonu Nigam, Sunidhi Chauhan, Sukhwinder Singh and Shabab Sabri. With a background score composed by Salim–Sulaiman, the album was released on 31 May 2004.

The soundtrack of the film was well received by music critics, who praised the album's lyrics and vocals. Bollywood Hungama praised its songs and musical score, highlighting "Rab Kare", "Jeene Ke Hain Chaar Din", "Laal Dupatta" and the title song.

The music topped charts on a number of platforms in India. The soundtrack was one of the best-selling Bollywood soundtracks of the year, with 2 million units sold according to Box Office India.

Track listing
No.	Title	Lyrics	Music	Singer(s)	Length
1.	"Rab Kare"	Jalees Sherwani	Sajid–Wajid	Udit Narayan, Alka Yagnik	4:19
2.	"Mujhse Shaadi Karogi"	Jalees Sherwani	Sajid-Wajid	Udit Narayan, Sonu Nigam, Sunidhi Chauhan	5:26
3.	"Aaja Soniye"	Jalees Sherwani	Sajid-Wajid	Sonu Nigam, Alka Yagnik	4:58
4.	"Rab Kare II"	Jalees Sherwani	Sajid-Wajid	Alka Yagnik, Sonu Nigam, Shabab Sabri	6:05
5.	"Jeene Ke Hain Chaar Din"	Sameer	Anu Malik	Sonu Nigam, Sunidhi Chauhan	5:21
6.	"Kar Doon Kamaal"	Jalees Sherwani	Sajid-Wajid	Sukhwinder Singh, Sunidhi Chauhan	4:34
7.	"Laal Dupatta"	Arun Bhairav	Sajid-Wajid	Udit Narayan, Alka Yagnik	5:14
8.	"Aaja Soniye" (Remix)	Jalees Sherwani	Sajid-Wajid	Sonu Nigam, Alka Yagnik	4:05

== Marketing and release ==
Entrances of several theatres in India and abroad were decorated as marriage mandaps (halls) for the film. Sajid Nadiadwala said, "You have to make the entire process of movie-going exciting. Since the title itself talks of marriage, making the entrance of theatres resemble mandaps was the best possible way to attract cinegoers."

The producers sponsored several contests as part of Mujhse Shaadi Karogi's marketing campaign, with prizes including a foreign honeymoon trip and wedding clothing by Biba and Neeta Lulla. They released a 64-page, palm-sized book with information about the characters' love triangle, tips about how to woo a woman and pictures of the three main characters. The film was released on 30 July 2004. Zee TV brought its UK distribution rights, the first film distributed by the channel.

Mujhse Shaadi Karogi opened well throughout India, despite poor weather, and did very good business in its theatrical run. The film also opened well in the overseas market, ranking eighth at the UK box office over its first weekend. After a good first week, it prevailed over its second weekend, earning ₹ 35.4 million from 32 screens in the United Kingdom and ₹ 32.9 million from 48 screens in the United States. Mujhse Shaadi Karogi was a major commercial success, earning ₹ 565 million at the box office and thus becoming the fourth-highest-grossing Bollywood film of the year.

Mujhse Shaadi Karogi was released on DVD on 27 September 2004 in all regions on a single NTSC-format disc. Distributed by T-Series, the DVD included deleted scenes, extra songs, a theatrical trailer and TV advertisements. The film's Video CD was released at the same time. A Blu-ray disc was released on 10 July 2010.

== Reception ==
Mujhse Shaadi Karogi was well received by critics, who praised the film's direction, cinematography, choreography, costumes, styling and performances.

Taran Adarsh of Bollywood Hungama gave it four stars out of five, calling it a "mass entertainer" and an apt example of escapist cinema which "transports you to a world of make-believe". Adarsh praised the chemistry between Khan, Kumar and Chopra and wrote, "Stylishly shot at some panoramic locales of Mauritius, with no double entendres, the film proves yet again that only David can pull off such stories without the cinegoer feeling cheated by an obscure plot."

Sukanya Verma of Rediff.com also praised the film: "It's a screwball comedy with gorgeous visuals, crisp editing, and fine performances. David Dhawan gets it right." A review in The Hindu called it "pure entertainment" and praised the clean humour and Kumar's performance writing that "Khan shows more brawn than histrionics, while Kumar displays a real flair for comedy. Some of his expressions are delightfully wicked and effortless."

For India Today, Anupama Chopra found the film "partly fun but mostly exhausting": "Mujhse Shaadi Karogi is pure dazzle. There are clothes of all designs imaginable – from gorgeous embroidered and sequinned Indian outfits to sleek and hip western attire. There are locations of breathtaking beauty from aquamarine seas to quaint churches." She also appreciated many of the film's gags, particularly those derived from the 2000 American film Meet the Parents. Writing for Outlook, Namrata Joshi rated the film two stars, and noted its similarities to the 2003 American film Anger Management.

== Accolades ==
Award	Date (Note: Linked to the article about the awards held that year, wherever possible.)	Category	Recipient(s) and nominee(s)	Result	Ref.
Filmfare Awards	26 February 2005	Best Supporting Actor	Akshay Kumar	Nominated	
Filmfare Awards	26 February 2005	Best Performance in a Comic Role	Akshay Kumar	Nominated	
Filmfare Awards	26 February 2005	Best Female Playback Singer	Alka Yagnik (for song "Laal Dupatta")	Nominated	
Global Indian Film Awards	28 January 2005	Best Film	Mujhse Shaadi Karogi	Nominated	
Global Indian Film Awards	28 January 2005	Best Actor	Salman Khan	Nominated	
Global Indian Film Awards	28 January 2005	Best Supporting Actor	Akshay Kumar	Won	
Global Indian Film Awards	28 January 2005	Best Playback Singer Female	Alka Yagnik (for song "Rab Kare")	Nominated	
Global Indian Film Awards	28 January 2005	Best Costume Design	Vikram Phadnis	Won	
International Indian Film Academy Awards	11 June 2005	Best Film	Mujhse Shaadi Karogi	Nominated	
International Indian Film Academy Awards	11 June 2005	Best Director	David Dhawan	Nominated	
International Indian Film Academy Awards	11 June 2005	Best Actor	Salman Khan	Nominated	
International Indian Film Academy Awards	11 June 2005	Best Actress	Priyanka Chopra	Nominated	
International Indian Film Academy Awards	11 June 2005	Best Performance in a Comic Role	Akshay Kumar	Won	
International Indian Film Academy Awards	11 June 2005	Best Music Director	Sajid–Wajid	Nominated	
International Indian Film Academy Awards	11 June 2005	Best Lyricist	Arun Bhairav (for song "Laal Dupatta")	Nominated	
International Indian Film Academy Awards	11 June 2005	Best Male Playback	Udit Narayan (for song "Laal Dupatta")	Nominated	
International Indian Film Academy Awards	11 June 2005	Best Female Playback	Alka Yagnik (for song "Laal Dupatta")	Nominated	
International Indian Film Academy Awards	11 June 2005	Best Art Direction	Sharmishta Roy	Won	
International Indian Film Academy Awards	11 June 2005	Best Background Score	Salim–Sulaiman	Won	
International Indian Film Academy Awards	11 June 2005	Best Choreography	Farah Khan (for song "Laal Dupatta")	Won	
International Indian Film Academy Awards	11 June 2005	Best Costume Design	Vikram Phadnis	Won	
Screen Awards	16 January 2005	Best Film	Mujhse Shaadi Karogi	Nominated	
Screen Awards	16 January 2005	Best Supporting Actor	Akshay Kumar	Nominated	
Screen Awards	16 January 2005	Best Actor in a Comic Role	Rajpal Yadav	Nominated	
Screen Awards	16 January 2005	Best Music Director	Sajid–Wajid, Anu Malik	Nominated	
Screen Awards	16 January 2005	Best Lyricist	Arun Bhairav (for song "Laal Dupatta")	Nominated	
Screen Awards	16 January 2005	Best Cinematography	Sanjay F. Gupta	Nominated	
Screen Awards	16 January 2005	Best Art Direction	Sharmishta Roy	Won	
Screen Awards	16 January 2005	Best Sound Design	Jitendra Choudhary	Nominated	
Screen Awards	16 January 2005	Best Choreography	Farah Khan (for song "Laal Dupatta")	Nominated	
Screen Awards	16 January 2005	Best Special Effects	Merzin Tavaria (Prime Focus)	Nominated	
Stardust Awards	20 February 2005	Superstar of Tomorrow – Female	Priyanka Chopra	Won	
Zee Cine Awards	26 March 2005	Best Film	Mujhse Shaadi Karogi	Nominated	
Zee Cine Awards	26 March 2005	Best Actor – Male	Salman Khan	Nominated	
Zee Cine Awards	26 March 2005	Best Actor in a Comic Role	Akshay Kumar	Nominated	
Zee Cine Awards	26 March 2005	Best Screenplay	Anees Bazmee	Nominated	
Zee Cine Awards	26 March 2005	Best Music Director	Sajid–Wajid	Nominated	
Zee Cine Awards	26 March 2005	Song of the Year	"Aaja Soniye"	Nominated	
Zee Cine Awards	26 March 2005	Best Audiography	Jitendra Choudhary	Nominated	
