= Shyam Goel =

Indian screenwriter

Shyam K. Goel is an Indian screenwriter. He was nominated for Best Story for the film Aitraaz at the 2005 IIFA awards.

== Filmography ==
- Lucky Kabootar (2014)
- Kal Kissne Dekha (2009)
- 36 China Town (2006)
- Aitraaz (2004)
- Baaz: A Bird in Danger (2003)
- Humraaz (2003)
- Chori Chori Chupke Chupke (2001)
- Baadshah (1999)
- Soldier (1998)
- Maharaja (1998)
