= IIFA Award for Best Sound Re-Recording =

Annual film award in India

The IIFA for Best Sound Re-Recording is a technical award chosen ahead of the ceremonies. The award is also known as IIFA for Best Sound Mixing.

== Multiple wins ==
Wins	Recipient
4	Anuj Mathur
3	Leslie Fernandes, Anup Dev, Debajit Changmai
2	Ajay Kumar P. B.

== Awards ==
The winners are listed below:-

Year	Winner	Film
2024	Sampath Alwar, Chris Jacobson, Rob Marshall, Marti Humphrey	Jawan
2023	Gunjan Augustine Sah, Boloy Kumar Doloi, Rahul Karpe	Monica, O My Darling
2022	Ajay Kumar P.B. & Manik Batra	83
2020	Anuj Mathur	War
2019	Ajay Kumar P.B.	Andhadhun
2018	not awarded	not awarded
2017	Anuj Mathur	Sultan
2016	Ajay Kumar P.B.	Bajirao Mastani
2015	Debajit Changmai	Haider
2014	Anup Dev Debajit Changmai	Chennai ExpressBhaag Milkha Bhaag
2013	Debajit Changmai	Barfi!
2012	Anuj Mathur & Baylon Fonseca	Zindagi Na Milegi Dobara
2011	Leslie Fernandes	Dabangg
2010	Anup Dev	3 Idiots
2009	Leslie Fernandes	Race
2008	Anuj Mathur; Ali Merchant	Chak De India
2007	Hitendra Gosh	Rang De Basanti
2006	P. Balaraman	Aashiq Banaya Aapne
2005	Anup Dev	Aitraaz
2004	Leslie-Anand Theatre	LOC Kargil
2003	Leslie Fernandes	Devdas
2002	H. Sridhar	Lagaan
2001	Hitendra Ghosh	Jungle
2000	Suresh Kathuria	Hum Dil De Chuke Sanam

== See also ==
- IIFA Awards
- Bollywood
- Cinema of India
