= 6th IIFA Awards =

Indian film award ceremony in 2005

- Date: 9 June 2005– 11 June 2005
- Site: Amsterdam Arena; Amsterdam, Netherlands
- Hosted by: Fardeen Khan; Shahrukh Khan; Karan Johar

Highlights
- Best Picture: Veer-Zaara
- Best Direction: Yash Chopra (Veer-Zaara)
- Best Actor: Shahrukh Khan (Veer-Zaara)
- Best Actress: Rani Mukerji (Hum Tum)
- Most awards: Veer-Zaara (7)
- Most nominations: Mujhse Shaadi Karogi (13)

Television coverage
- Channel: Star Plus
- Network: STAR TV

The 2005 IIFA Awards, officially known as the 6th International Indian Film Academy Awards ceremony, presented by the International Indian Film Academy honoured the best films of 2004 and took place between 9–11 June 2005.

The weekend began with the IIFA Inaugural Press Conference at which IIFA Brand Ambassador, actor Amitabh Bachchan, officially launched the three-day extravaganza.

This was followed by the IIFA World Premiere held at the centuries-old Pathe Tuschinski Theatre. The film screened was Pradeep Sarkar's Parineeta.

This was the first year where the IIFA Film Festival was held which showcased some of the best films Indian Cinema has to offer. It was inaugurated by Yash Chopra and was held at the Pathe Tuschinski Theatre.

An IIFA Workshop was also held which served as a unique meeting between some prominent filmmakers from India and Dutch film professionals. Key speakers at the workshop included Karan Johar, Shabana Azmi, Javed Akhtar and Abhishek Bachchan. The workshop also featured a screening of the blockbuster Kal Ho Naa Ho.

Other events included the FICCI-IIFA Global Business Forum and the IIFA Foundation Celebrity Cricket Match. The IIFA Foundation Celebrity Cricket Match saw teams captained by Shahrukh Khan and Hrithik Roshan face against each other with Hrithik's team emerging as the victors.

The official ceremony took place on 11 June 2005, at the Amsterdam Arena, in Amsterdam, Netherlands. During the ceremony, IIFA Awards were awarded in 29 competitive categories. The ceremony was televised in India and internationally on Star Plus for the first time. Actors Fardeen Khan and Shahrukh Khan along with director Karan Johar co-hosted the ceremony. Along with the award distribution, the ceremony also included performances by international pop group Bombay Rockers, international magician Hans Kolak, Salman Khan, Malaika Arora Khan, Amrita Arora, Esha Deol, Isha Sharvani, Shahid Kapoor, Kareena Kapoor and Daler Mehndi. It also included Abhishek Bachchan's first-ever international performance.

Veer-Zaara led the ceremony with 10 nominations, followed by Mujhse Shaadi Karogi with 9 nominations, Aitraaz with 8 nominations, Swades with 7 nominations, and Dhoom with 6 nominations.

Veer-Zaara won 7 awards, including Best Film, Best Director (for Yash Chopra), Best Actor (for Shah Rukh Khan), Best Supporting Actress (for Rani Mukerji) and Best Music Director (for Late Madan Mohan), thus becoming the most-awarded film at the ceremony.

Other multiple awards winners included Mujhse Shaadi Karogi with 5 awards, Aitraaz, Dhoom and Murder with 3 awards each, and Main Hoon Na and Maqbool receiving 2 awards each.

In addition, movies receiving a single award included, Chameli for (Best Cinematography), Swades for (Best Lyricist), Taarzan: The Wonder Car for (Best Female Debut), Hum Tum for (Best Actress) and Yuva for (Best Supporting Actor).

Shah Rukh Khan received dual nominations for Best Actor for his performances in Swades and Veer-Zaara, winning for the latter.

Rani Mukerji set an unmatched record by becoming the only actress till date to win both popular female acting awards in the same year, winning Best Actress for Hum Tum and Best Supporting Actress for Veer-Zaara. She also received an additional Best Supporting Actress nomination for her performance in Yuva.

== Background ==
The awards began in 2000 and the first ceremony was held in London at The Millennium Dome. From then on the awards were held at locations around the world signifying the international success of Bollywood. The next award ceremony was announced to be held in Dubai, UAE in 2006.

== Winners and nominees ==
Winners are listed first and highlighted in boldface.

=== Popular awards ===
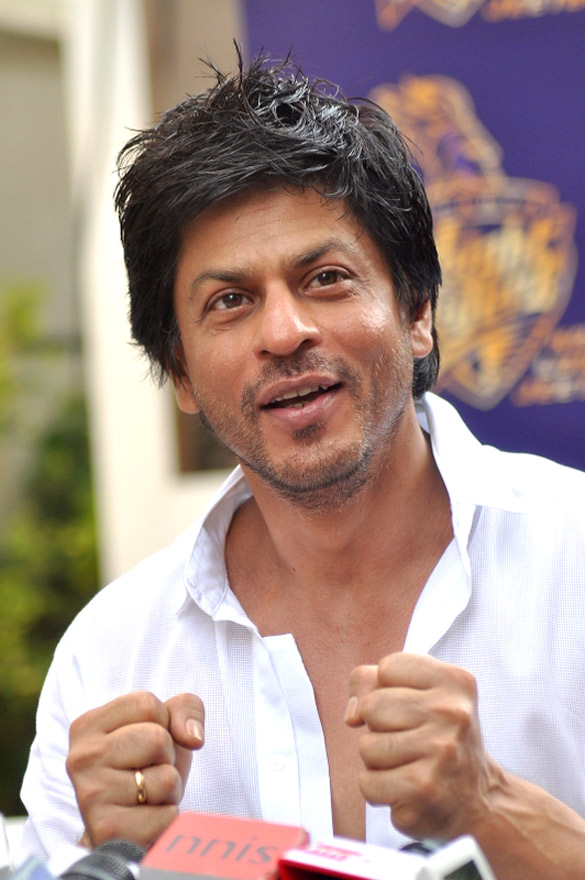
Shahrukh Khan (Best Actor)

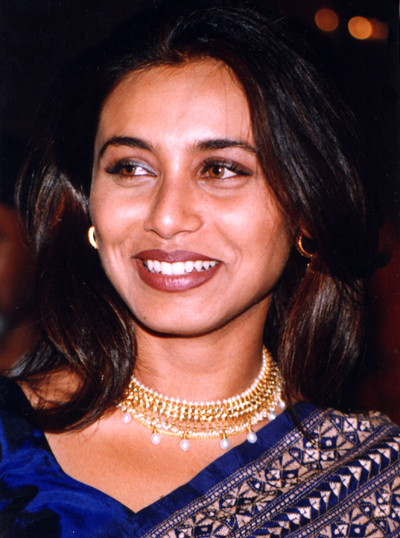
Rani Mukerji (Best Actress)

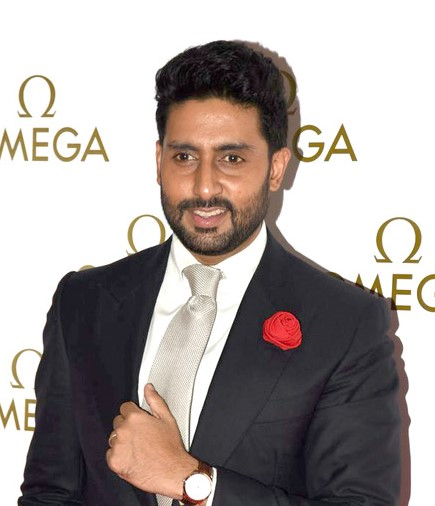
Abhishek Bachchan (Best Supporting Actor)

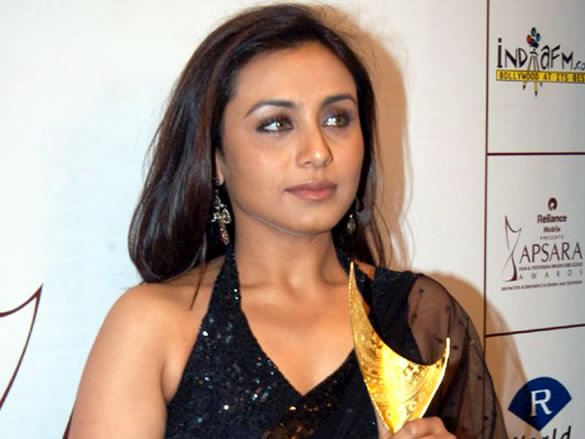
Rani Mukerji (Best Supporting Actress)

Best Picture	Best Director
**Veer-Zaara – Yash Raj Films**; Dhoom – Yash Raj Films; Hum Tum – Yash Raj Films; Mujhse Shaadi Karogi – Nadiadwala Grandson Entertainment Pvt. Ltd; Swades – UTV Motion Pictures and Ashutosh Gowariker Productions	**Yash Chopra – Veer-Zaara**; Ashutosh Gowarikar – Swades; David Dhawan – Mujhse Shaadi Karogi; Farah Khan – Main Hoon Na; Kunal Kohli – Hum Tum
Best Performance in a Leading Role – Male	Best Performance in a Leading Role – Female
**Shah Rukh Khan – Veer-Zaara as Veer Pratap Singh**; Nana Patekar – Ab Tak Chhappan as Inspector Sadhu Agashe; Saif Ali Khan – Hum Tum as Karan Kapoor; Salman Khan – Mujhse Shaadi Karogi as Sameer Malhotra; Shah Rukh Khan – Swades as Mohan Bhargava	**Rani Mukerji – Hum Tum as Rhea Prakash**; Kareena Kapoor – Aitraaz as Priya Saxena/Malhotra; Preity Zinta – Veer-Zaara as Zaara Hayaat Khan; Priyanka Chopra – Mujhse Shaadi Karogi as Rani Singh; Shilpa Shetty – Phir Milenge as Tamanna Sahni; Urmila Matondkar – Ek Hasina Thi as Sarika Vartak
Best Performance in a Supporting Role – Male	Best Performance in a Supporting Role – Female
**Abhishek Bachchan – Yuva as Lallan Singh**; Amitabh Bachchan – Veer-Zaara as Choudhary Sumer Singh; Pankaj Kapur – Maqbool as Jahangir Khan (Abbaji); Paresh Rawal – Aitraaz as Advocate Patel; Zayed Khan – Main Hoon Na as Lakshman Prasad Sharma a.k.a. Lucky	**Rani Mukerji – Veer-Zaara as Saamiya Siddiqui**; Divya Dutta – Veer-Zaara as Shabbo; Esha Deol – Dhoom as Sheena; Kishori Ballal – Swades as Kaveri Amma; Rani Mukerji – Yuva as Shashi Biswas
Best Performance in a Comic Role	Best Performance in a Negative Role
**Akshay Kumar – Mujhse Shaadi Karogi as Arun Khanna a.k.a. Sunny**; Arshad Warsi – Hulchul as Lucky; Paresh Rawal – Hulchul as Kishen / Murari (twin brothers); Ritesh Deshmukh – Masti as Amar; Uday Chopra – Dhoom as Sub-Inspector Ali Akbar Fateh Khan	**John Abraham – Dhoom as Kabir**; Ajay Devgn – Khakee as Yashwant Angre; Priyanka Chopra – Aitraaz as Sonia Roy; Saif Ali Khan – Ek Hasina Thi as Karan Singh Rathod; Sanjay Dutt – Musafir as Billa; Suniel Shetty – Main Hoon Na as Raghavan / Major Raghav Dutta
Best Debut Director	Female Debutant Star
**Farah Khan – Main Hoon Na**	**Ayesha Takia – Taarzan: The Wonder Car as Priya**

=== Musical awards ===
Best Music Director	Best Lyrics
**Late Madan Mohan – Veer-Zaara**; Anu Malik – Main Hoon Na; Anu Malik – Murder; Himesh Reshammiya – Aitraaz; Pritam – Dhoom; Sajid–Wajid – Mujhse Shaadi Karogi	**"Pal Pal Hai Bhari" from Swades – Javed Akhtar**; **"Bheege Honth Tere" from Murder – Sayeed Quadri**; "Lal Dupatta" from Mujhse Shaadi Karogi – Arun Bhairav; "Saaki Saaki" from Musafir – Dev Kohli; "Tere Liye" from Veer-Zaara – Javed Akhtar; "Woh Tassavur Ka Aalam" from Aitraaz – Sameer
Best Male Playback Singer	Best Female Playback Singer
**Kunal Ganjawala for "Bheege Honth Tere" – Murder**; Sonu Nigam for " Main Hoon Na" – Main Hoon Na; Udit Narayan for "Aankhen Bandh Karke" – Aitraaz; Udit Narayan for "Lal Dupatta" – Mujhse Shaadi Karogi; Udit Narayan for "Yeh Taara Woh Taara" – Swades	**Sunidhi Chauhan for "Dhoom Machale" – Dhoom**; Alka Yagnik for "Aankhen Bandh Karke" – Aitraaz; Alka Yagnik for "Hum Tum" – Hum Tum; Alka Yagnik for "Lal Dupatta" – Mujhse Shaadi Karogi; Sunidhi Chauhan for "Sajna Ve" – Chameli
Best Song Recording	Best Background score
**Murder – Satish Gupta**	**Mujhse Shaadi Karogi – Salim–Sulaiman**

=== Backstage awards ===
Best Story	Best Screenplay
**Veer-Zaara – Aditya Chopra**; Murder – Anurag Basu; Aitraaz – Shiraz Ahmed and Shyam Goel; Ab Tak Chhappan – Sandeep Shrivastava; Swades – Ashutosh Gowariker and M. G. Sathya	**Maqbool – Abbas Tyrewala and Vishal Bhardwaj**
Best Dialogue
**Maqbool – Vishal Bhardwaj**

=== Technical awards ===
Best Art Direction	Best Action
**Mujhse Shaadi Karogi – Sharmista Roy**	**Dhoom – Allan Amin**
Best Cinematography	Best Choreography
**Chameli – Aseem Bajaj**	**Mujhse Shaadi Karogi – Farah Khan**
Best Costume Design	Best Editing
**Mujhse Shaadi Karogi – Vikram Phadnis**	**Aitraaz – Hussain Barmawala**
Best Makeup	Best Sound Recording
**Veer-Zaara – Anil Pimpriker**	**Aitraaz – Rakesh Rajan**
Best Sound Re-Recording	Best Special Effects
**Aitraaz – Anup Dev**	**Main Hoon Na – Rajtaru Video Sonic & Eagle Video Films**

=== Special awards ===
==== Lifetime Achievement Award ====
- V. K. Murthy
- Shabana Azmi

==== Samsung Style Icon Award ====
- Hrithik Roshan

==== Samsung Style Diva Award ====
- Preity Zinta

==== Global Indian Media Personality Trophy ====
- Aishwarya Rai

== Superlatives ==
Films with multiple nominations
Nominations	Film
10	Veer-Zaara
9	Mujhse Shaadi Karogi
8	Aitraaz
7	Swades
6	Dhoom
5	Hum Tum
5	Main Hoon Na
3	Murder
2	Ab Tak Chhappan
2	Ek Hasina Thi
2	Hulchul
2	Musafir
2	Yuva

Films with multiple awards
Awards	Film
7	Veer-Zaara
5	Mujhse Shaadi Karogi
3	Aitraaz
3	Dhoom
2	Main Hoon Na
2	Maqbool
2	Murder
