= Ahmed and Mohammed Hussain =

Musicians from India

Ustad Ahmed Hussain Mohammed Hussain
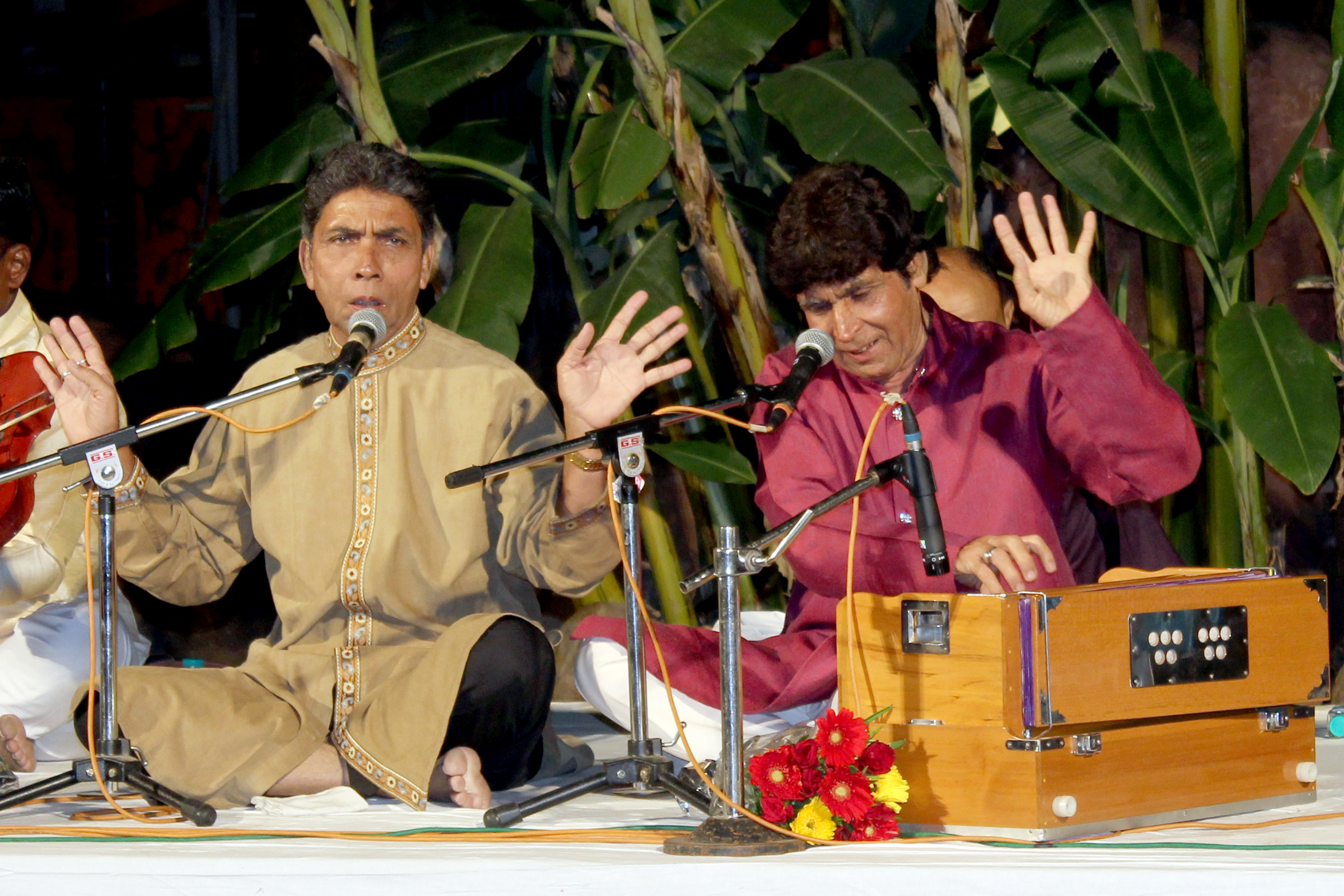
- Ahmed and Mohammed Hussain performing at Madhya Pradesh Tribal Museum November 2015

Background information
- Born: Ustad Ahmed Hussain 3 February 1951, Ustad Mohammed Hussain 2 December 1953; Jaipur, Rajasthan, India
- Genres: Ghazal, Classical, Devotional, Folk, Na`at, Hamd
- Occupations: Composer, singer, music director, entrepreneur
- Instruments: Vocals, Harmonium, Tanpura, Piano
- Years active: 1958–present
- Labels: EMI, His Master's Voice, Saregama, Universal Music, Sony BMG Music Entertainment, Polydor, TIPS, Venus, T-Series

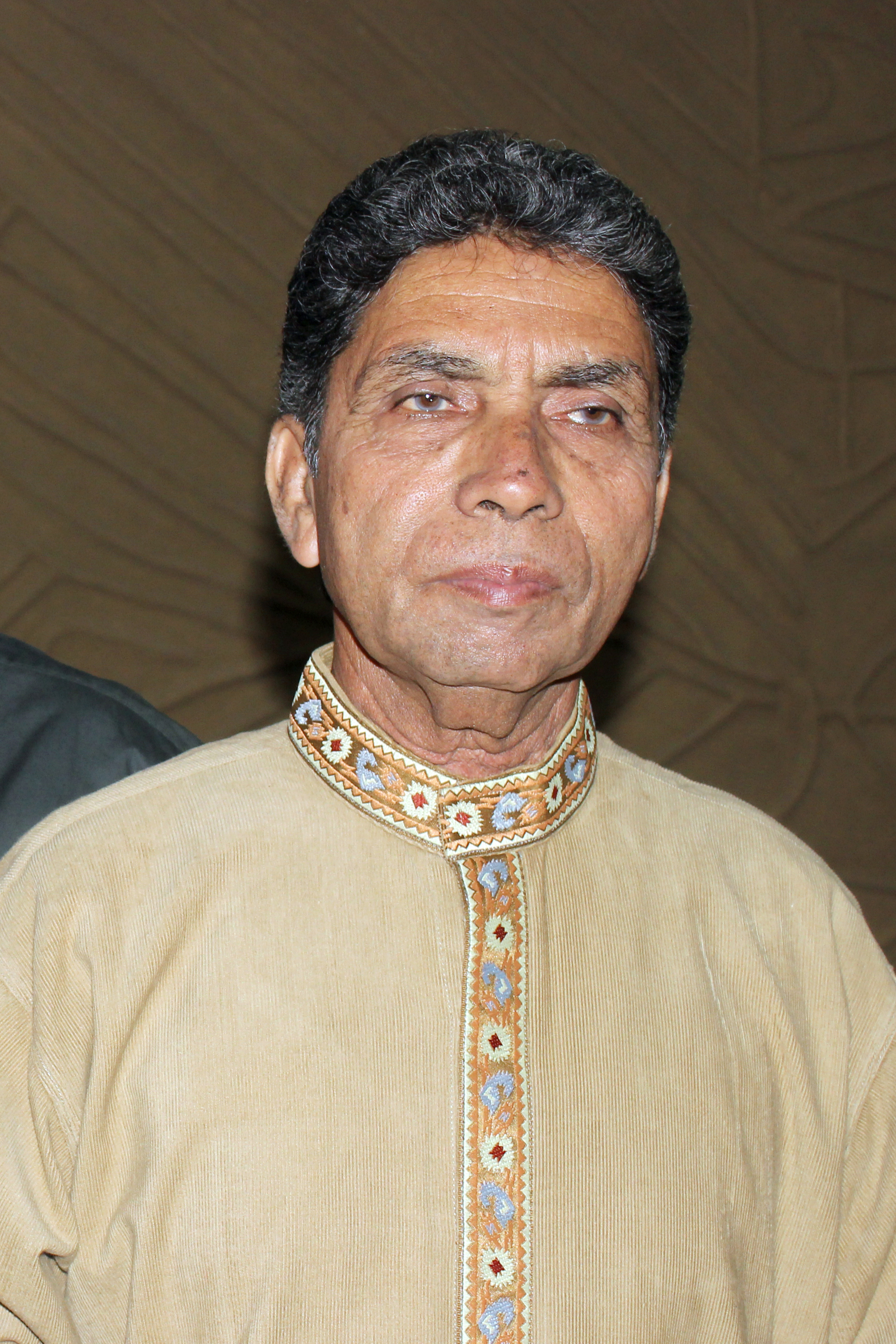
Ustad Ahmed Hussain – Ahmed and Mohammed Hussain -Indian Ghazal singers

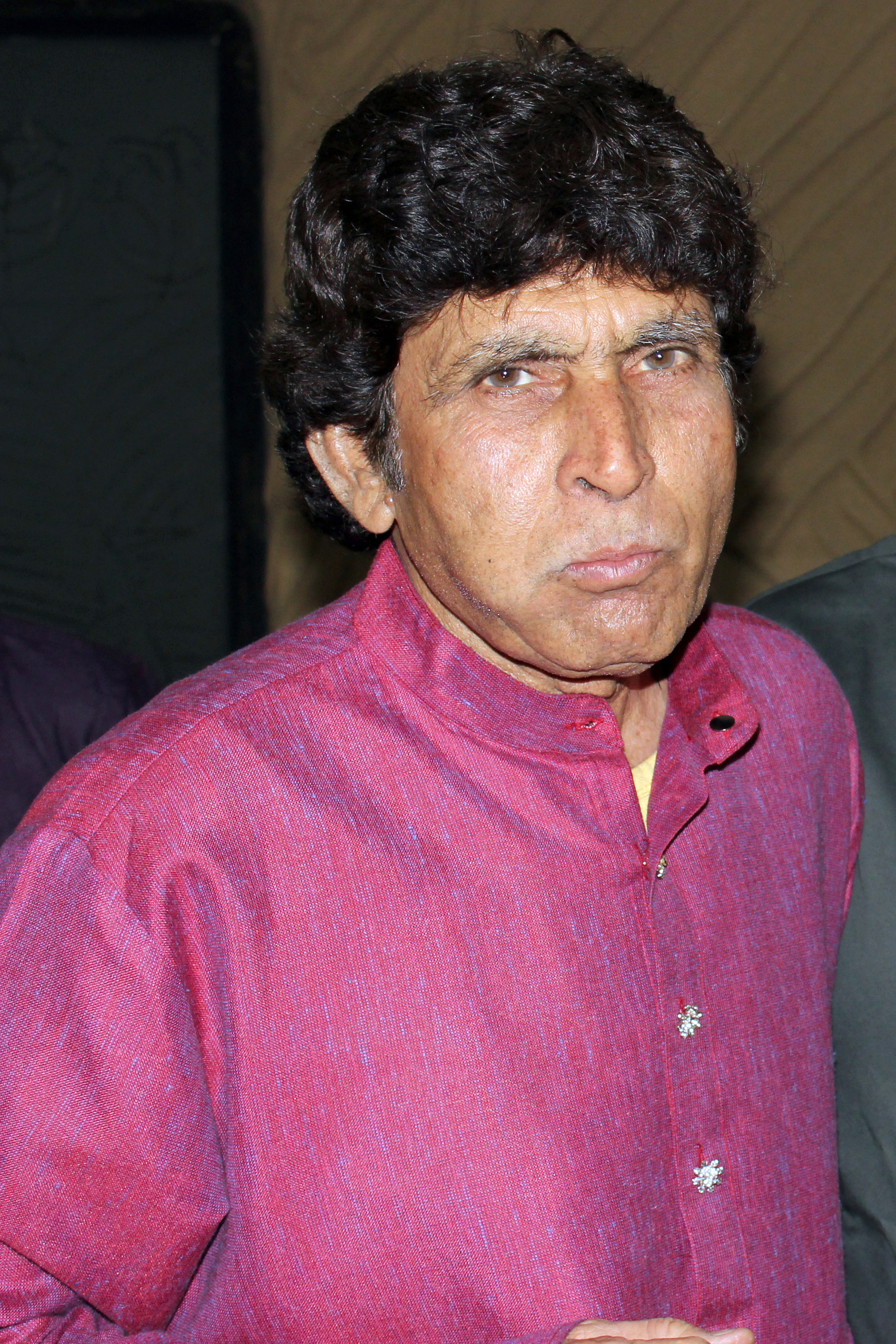
Ustad Mohammad Hussain – Ahmed and Mohammed Hussain -Indian Ghazal singers

Ahmed Hussain and Mohammed Hussain are ghazal singers from Jaipur, India. They are two brothers who sing classical ghazals and devotional music.

== Early life and career ==
Born in Rajasthan as sons of the famous ghazal and thumri singer Ustad Afzal Hussain, the duo touches genres like Indian classical music and bhajan as well as ghazal. They started their singing career in 1958 as classical and thumri artists belonging to Jaipur Gharana.

Their first album Guldasta was released in 1980 and was a critical and commercial success. Since then they have released around 50 studio albums. They attempted popularizing their music by turning to tempo music in Maan bhi ja.

Ustad Ahmed and Mohammed Hussain have notable personalities in the world of ghazals. They have also performed before the President of India in 1976. Their sons Javed Hussain, Muazzam Hussain and Imran Hussain are also singers.

== Awards ==
- Sangeet Natak Akademi Award in 2000 for ghazal and devotional singing of Na`at, Hamd.
- They were awarded Padma Shri on the eve of 74th Republic Day on 25 January 2023.
- Lokmat Sur Jyotsna National Music Award - 2025 Legend Award for him contribution to Indian music

== Albums ==
1. Naat
2. Rifaaqat
3. Mukhatib
4. Shamakhana
5. Kabhi Kabhi
6. Noor-E-Islam
7. Khayal-E-Yaar
8. Pyar Ka Jazba
9. Greatest Hits – two discs (His Master's Voice)
10. Rahnuma
11. Zindagi
12. Guldasta (first album)
13. Nissar
14. Shraddha (Bhajan)
15. Bhavna (Bhajan)
16. Anupam Vani (Bhajan)
17. Re-Man
18. Sarmaya (released 19 September 2006 on Fontana India)
19. Aagosh
20. Safaq
21. Dil Ki baat
22. Raaz-E-ulfat
23. Dasam Granth
24. Aah
25. Kashish
26. Meri Mohabbat
27. Izhaar
28. Humkhayal
29. Veer-Zara
30. Ghazals & Geet
31. Ai-Saba
32. Khayaal – Geets & Ghazals (live)
33. Kah Kashan Vol. 1 (live)
34. Shamakhana Vol. 2: A Live Mehfil Of Ghazals
35. The Golden Moments – Ahmed Hussain – Mohammed Hussain (SAREGAMA)
36. The Golden Moments – Purkaif Hawayen Hain
37. The Golden Moments – Pyar Ka Jazba
38. The Golden Moments – Mausam Aayenge – Jaayenge
39. Kabhi Kabhi
40. Alad Ballad Bawe Da-Satrangi (Punjabi)
41. The Great Ghazals
42. Dhola Vasda Raven (Punjabi)
43. Ek Hi Saroop (Punjabi)
44. Tasveer
45. Khwab Basera (Nov 2010)
46. Anurodher Asar – Vol. 2 (January 1994) (Bengali)
47. Maan Bhi Ja

Ustad Ahmed Hussain and Ustad Mohammad Hussain has also awarded by the CENTRAL SANGEET NATAK AKADEMI AWARD in the year 2017 by the President of India.

== Films ==
- Veer-Zaara (2004)

== Charity concerts ==
Ahmed and Mohammed Hussain have performed in concerts all over the world to help raise funds for cancer patients, the blind and the physically challenged people.
