= Sharmishta Roy =

Indian film art director and production designer

- Occupations: Art director, production designer
- Years active: 1994–present
- Father: Sudhendu Roy

Sharmishta Roy is an Indian film art director and production designer who works predominantly in Hindi cinema.

== Personal life ==
Born to Sudhendu Roy, noted production designer of Bimal Roy's films, like Madhumati (1958), Sujata (1959) and Bandini (1963), and Yash Chopra's Silsila (1981) and Chandni (1989), she assisted her father before starting out as an independent art director.

She is best known for her collaborations with Yash Raj Films and Dharma Productions in films including Dilwale Dulhania Le Jayenge (1995), Dil To Pagal Hai (1997), Kuch Kuch Hota Hai (1998), Mohabbatein (2000), Kabhi Khushi Kabhie Gham (2001), Kal Ho Naa Ho (2003), Veer-Zaara (2004) and Kabhi Alvida Naa Kehna (2006). All these films earned her nominations for the Filmfare Award for Best Art Direction, winning the award a leading 3 times for Dil To Pagal Hai, Kuch Kuch Hota Hai and Kabhi Khushi Kabhie Gham.

She is also the recipient of the National Film Award for Best Production Design for M. F. Husain's Meenaxi: A Tale of Three Cities (2003).

== Select filmography ==
- Yeh Dillagi (1994)
- Ikke Pe Ikka (1994)
- Dilwale Dulhania Le Jayenge (1995)
- Dastak (1996)
- Dil To Pagal Hai (1997)
- Mrityudand (1997)
- Pyaar Kiya To Darna Kya (1998)
- Duplicate (1998)
- Jab Pyaar Kisise Hota Hai (1998)
- Achanak (1998)
- Kuch Kuch Hota Hai (1998)
- Taal (1999)
- Mohabbatein (2000)
- Kabhi Khushi Kabhie Gham (2001)
- Koi... Mil Gaya (2003)
- Kal Ho Naa Ho (2003)
- Meenaxi: A Tale of Three Cities (2004)
- Hum Tum (2004)
- Dev (2004)
- Veer-Zaara (2004)
- Bunty Aur Babli (2005)
- Kabhi Alvida Naa Kehna (2006)
- Ta Ra Rum Pum (2007)
- Bachna Ae Haseeno (2008)
- Anjaana Anjaani (2010)
- Oh Kadhal Kanmani (2015)
- Kaatru Veliyidai (2017)
- Chekka Chivantha Vaanam (2018)
- Thug Life (2025)

== Awards ==
Add table for awards and nominations

She is a three-time recipient of the Filmfare Award for Best Art Direction, for Dil To Pagal Hai (1998), Kuch Kuch Hota Hai (1999) and Kabhi Khushi Kabhie Gham (2002), and a winner of the National Film Award for Best Production Design for Meenaxi: A Tale of Three Cities (2003).
