= 24th IIFA Awards =

2024 Indian film award event

- Site: Yas Island, Abu Dhabi
- Hosted by: Karan Johar; Shah Rukh Khan
- Official website: iifa.com/iifa-2024

Highlights
- Best Picture: Animal
- Best Direction: Vidhu Vinod Chopra (12th Fail)
- Best Actor: Shah Rukh Khan (Jawan)
- Best Actress: Rani Mukerji (Mrs. Chatterjee vs Norway)
- Most awards: Animal (9)
- Most nominations: Animal (12)

Television coverage
- Channel: Zee TV
- Network: Zee Entertainment Enterprises

The 24th International Indian Film Academy Awards, also known as the IIFA, The event was held on 28 September 2024, at Abu Dhabi. Thus, it became the first city to host the event for third consecutive time

Animal led the ceremony with 12 nominations, followed by Rocky Aur Rani Kii Prem Kahaani with 10 nominations, Jawan with 8 nominations, Pathaan with 6 nominations, and 12th Fail with 5 nominations.

Animal won 9 awards, including Best Film and Best Supporting Actor (for Anil Kapoor), thus becoming the most-awarded film at the ceremony.

== Winners and nominees ==
The nominations were announced on 19 August 2024. The winners were announced on 28 September 2024.

=== Main awards ===
Best Film	Best Director
Animal; 12th Fail; Jawan; Rocky Aur Rani Kii Prem Kahaani; Sam Bahadur; Satyaprem Ki Katha	Vidhu Vinod Chopra – 12th Fail; Amit Rai – OMG 2; Atlee – Jawan; Karan Johar – Rocky Aur Rani Kii Prem Kahaani; Sandeep Reddy Vanga – Animal; Siddharth Anand – Pathaan
Best Actor	Best Actress
Shah Rukh Khan – Jawan as Captain Vikram Rathore / Azad; Ranbir Kapoor – Animal as Ranvijay Singh Balbir "Vijay" / Aziz Haque; Ranveer Singh – Rocky Aur Rani Kii Prem Kahaani as Rocky Randhawa; Sunny Deol – Gadar 2 as Tara Singh; Vicky Kaushal – Sam Bahadur as Sam Manekshaw; Vikrant Massey – 12th Fail as Manoj Kumar Sharma	Rani Mukerji – Mrs. Chatterjee vs Norway as Debika Chatterjee; Alia Bhatt – Rocky Aur Rani Kii Prem Kahaani as Rani Chatterjee; Deepika Padukone – Pathaan as Dr. Rubina "Rubai" Mohsin; Kiara Advani – Satyaprem Ki Katha as Katha Kapadia; Taapsee Pannu – Dunki as Manu Randhawa
Best Supporting Actor	Best Supporting Actress
Anil Kapoor – Animal as Balbir Singh / Kailash Petkar; Dharmendra – Rocky Aur Rani Kii Prem Kahaani as Kanwal Lund; Gajraj Rao – Satyaprem Ki Katha as Narayan; Jaideep Ahlawat – An Action Hero as Bhoora Singh Solanki; Tota Roy Chowdhury – Rocky Aur Rani Kii Prem Kahaani as Chandon Chatterjee	Shabana Azmi – Rocky Aur Rani Kii Prem Kahaani as Jamini Chatterjee; Geeta Aggarwal Sharma – 12th Fail as Pushpa Sharma; Jaya Bachchan – Rocky Aur Rani Kii Prem Kahaani as Dhanlakshmi Randhawa; Sanya Malhotra – Sam Bahadur as Silloo Manekshaw; Triptii Dimri – Animal as Zoya
Best Performance in a Negative Role	Star Debut of the Year – Female
Bobby Deol – Animal as Abrar Haque; Emraan Hashmi – Tiger 3 as Aatish Rehman; John Abraham – Pathaan as Jim; Vijay Sethupathi – Jawan as Kalee Gaikwad; Yami Gautam – OMG 2 as Kamini Maheshwari	Alizeh Agnihotri – Farrey
Best Music Director	Best Lyricist
Pritam, Vishal Mishra, Manan Bhardwaj, Shreyas Puranik, Jaani, Bhupinder Babbal, Ashim Kemson, Harshavardhan Rameshwar – Animal; Anirudh Ravichander – Jawan; Pritam – Rocky Aur Rani Kii Prem Kahaani; Sachin–Jigar – Zara Hatke Zara Bachke; Shantanu Moitra – 12th Fail; Vishal–Shekhar – Pathaan	Siddharth Singh, Garima Wahal – "Satranga" – Animal; Amitabh Bhattacharya – "Tere Vaaste" – Zara Hatke Zara Bachke; Gulzar – "Itni Si Baat" – Sam Bahadur; Javed Akhtar – "Nikle The Kabhi Hum Ghar Se" – Dunki; Kumaar – "Chaleya" – Jawan; Swanand Kirkire, IP Singh – "Lutt Putt Gaya" – Dunki
Best Male Playback Singer	Best Female Playback Singer
Bhupinder Babbal – "Arjan Vailly" – Animal; Arijit Singh – "Satranga" – Animal; Arijit Singh – "Jhoome Jo Pathaan" – Pathaan; Diljit Dosanjh – "Banda" – Dunki; Vishal Mishra – "Pehle Bhi Main" – Animal	Shilpa Rao – "Chaleya" – Jawan; Deepthi Suresh – "Aararaari Raaro" – Jawan; Shilpa Rao – "Besharam Rang" – Pathaan; Shreya Ghoshal – "Kashmir" – Animal; Shreya Ghoshal – "Tum Kya Mile" – Rocky Aur Rani Kii Prem Kahaani

=== Technical awards ===
Best Story (Original)	Best Story (Adapted)
Ishita Moitra, Shashank Khaitan, Sumit Roy – Rocky Aur Rani Kii Prem Kahaani	Vidhu Vinod Chopra, Jaskunwar Kohli – 12th Fail
Best Screenplay	Best Dialogue
Vidhu Vinod Chopra, Jaskunwar Kohli, Anurag Pathak, Aayush Saxena, Vikas Divyakirti – 12th Fail	Ishita Moitra – Rocky Aur Rani Kii Prem Kahaani
Best Cinematography	Best Editing
G. K. Vishnu – Jawan	Sandeep Reddy Vanga – Animal
Best Background Score	Best Choreography
Harshavardhan Rameshwar – Animal	Bosco–Caesar – "Jhoome Jo Pathaan" – Pathaan
Best Sound Mixing	Best Sound Design
Sampath Alwar, Chris Jacobson, Rob Marshall, Marti Humphrey – Jawan	Sachin Sudhakaran, Hariharan M – Animal
Best Special Effects
Red Chillies VFX – Jawan

=== Special awards ===
Category	Recipient(s)
Outstanding Achievement in Indian Cinema	Hema Malini
Outstanding Achievement in Indian Cinema	Jayantilal Gada
Achievement on completing 25 years in Cinema	Karan Johar

== Superlatives ==
Films with multiple nominations
Nominations	Film
12	Animal
10	Rocky Aur Rani Kii Prem Kahaani
8	Jawan
6	Pathaan
5	12th Fail
4	Dunki
4	Sam Bahadur
3	Satyaprem Ki Katha
2	OMG 2
2	Zara Hatke Zara Bachke

Films with multiple awards
Awards	Film
9	Animal
5	Jawan
3	12th Fail
3	Rocky Aur Rani Kii Prem Kahaani
