= Pinkvilla Screen and Style Icons Awards =

Annual awards for achievements in film & television

Screen and Style Icons Awards
- Awarded for: Achievement in the fields of film, television, business, sports, fashion, and politics
- Country: India
- Presented by: Pinkvilla
- Website: pinkvilla.com

Television/radio coverage
- Produced by: Pinkvilla; Across Media Solutions; Cinema Waale Film and Television Productions

Pinkvilla Screen and Style Icons Awards, previously known as Pinkvilla Style Icons Awards, was constituted in June 2022 as the first on-ground independent event of entertainment and lifestyle brand Pinkvilla. It rates and honors Indian achievers across the fields of film & television, business, sports, fashion, and politics among other sectors.

The first edition of the awards was held in Mumbai to commemorate 15 years of Pinkvilla's inception. The event was attended by actors, sportspersons, political leaders, fashion models, fashion designers and entrepreneurs.

== Editions ==
Year	Ceremony	Host	Reference
2022	1st PSSI Awards		
2023	2nd PSSI Awards		
2024	3rd PSSI Awards	Manish Paul; Neha Dhupia; Sophie Choudry	
2025	4th PSSI Awards		
2026	5th PSSI Awards	Neha Dhupia	

== Background ==
The maiden edition of the Pinkvilla Style Icons was held on 16 June 2022 at JW Marriott – in Juhu, Mumbai. Actors including Ranveer Singh, Kartik Aaryan, Kriti Sanon, Varun Dhawan, Kiara Advani, Sidharth Malhotra, Parineeti Chopra, Ayushmann Khurrana, Arjun Kapoor, Anil Kapoor, Sara Ali Khan, Janhvi Kapoor; cricketer Shikhar Dhawan, fashion designer Masaba Gupta, film director Karan Johar were among the guests who attended the event. Chief Minister of Meghalaya Conrad Sangma was also present to receive the award for the Super Stylish Politician. He was awarded by Pinkvilla CEO & Founder Nandini Shenoy. The event was hosted by former VJs Anusha Dandekar and Maniesh Paul.

== Jury members ==
With nominees spread across 35+ categories, the event was presided over by a panel of jury members namely Karisma Kapoor, Urmila Matondkar, Malaika Arora, Milind Soman, Ali Abbas Zafar, Vikram Phadnis, and Eka Lakhani. Two Reader's Choice categories were also announced & opened for public voting by Pinkvilla on its website.

== Winners and nominees ==
=== 2022 ===
Winners of the first edition (2022) of the Pinkvilla Style Icons Awards:

Category	Name
Super Stylish Mega Performer	Ranveer Singh
Super Stylish Actor Male (Popular Choice)	Sidharth Malhotra
Super Stylish Actor Female (Popular Choice)	Sara Ali Khan
Super Stylish Showbiz Icon	Karan Johar
Super Stylish Host	Maniesh Paul
Super Stylish Movie Honcho	Bhushan Kumar
Super Stylish Actor (Male)	Kartik Aaryan
Super Stylish Actor (Female)	Kiara Advani
Super Stylish Universal Star	Nawazuddin Siddiqui
Super Stylish Actor (Male) Reader's Choice	Ayushmann Khurrana
Super Stylish Actor (Female) Reader's Choice	Kriti Sanon
Super Stylish Youth Idol (Female)	Janhvi Kapoor
Super Stylish Inspirational Youth Idol (Male)	Varun Dhawan
Super Stylish Mould-Breaker (Male)	Arjun Kapoor
Super Stylish Mould-Breaker (Female)	Parineeti Chopra
Super Stylish Timeless Icon	Anil Kapoor
Super Stylish Breakthrough Star	Nushrat Bharuccha
Super Stylish Emerging Talent (Male)	Abhimanyu Dassani
Super Stylish Emerging Talent (Female)	Manushi Chhillar
Super Stylish Glam Star	Sunny Leone
Super Stylish Maverick Star	Radhika Madan
Super Stylish Filmmaker	Kabir Khan
Super Stylish TV Star Award (Male)	Nakuul Mehta
Super Stylish Swag Icon	Jackie Shroff
Super Stylish TV Star (Female)	Nia Sharma
Super Stylish TV Couple	Karan Kundrra; Tejasswi Prakash
Super Stylish Music Personality	Jasleen Royal
Super Stylish Haute Stepper	Vaani Kapoor
Super Stylish Politician	Conrad Sangma
Super Stylish Businessperson	Aman Gupta
Super Stylish Sports Star	Shikhar Dhawan
Super Stylish Fashion Designer	Masaba Gupta
Super Stylish Chef	Ranveer Brar
Super Stylish Charismatic Diva	Hina Khan
Super Stylish Eternal Legend	Asha Parekh

=== 2023 ===
Winners of the second edition (2023) of the Pinkvilla Style Icons Awards:

Category	Name
Most Glamorous Icon	Ananya Pandey
Super Stylish Entertainer Of The Year	Kartik Aaryan
Style Icon Of The Year	Kiara Advani
Glamorous Trendsetter Of The Year - Male	Ayushmann Khurrana
Glamorous Trendsetter Of The Year - Female	Disha Patani
Style Icon Of The Year - Reader's Choic	Janhvi Kapoor
Super Stylish Charismatic Diva	Vaani Kapoor
Stylish Game Changer - Male	Adivi Sesh
Stylish Game Changer - Female	Pooja Hegde
Stunningly Stylish Actor (TV)	Karan Kundra
Stunningly Stylish Actress (TV)	Tejasswi Prakash
Super Stylish Charming Diva	Shehnaaz Gill
Most Elegant Personality	Sivakarthikeyan
Mould-Breaker - Male	Rohit Saraf
Mould-Breaker - Female	Mouni Roy
Super Stylish Youth Idol	Rakul Preet Singh
Super Stylish Haute Stepper	Sunny Leone
Stylish Music Personality	Devi Sri Prasad
Super Stylish Versatile Personality	Sharad Kelkar
Fashion Trailblazer	Nora Fatehi
Timeless Style Icon	Kajol
Timeless Style Icon Male	Govinda
Presents Stylish Pathbreaker - Male	Arjun Kapoor
Presents Stylish Pathbreaker - Female	Bhumi Pednekar
Eternally Stylish Star	Vidya Balan
Stunningly Stylish Culinarian of the Year	Kunal Kapur
Super Stylish Role Model	Rani Mukerji
Glam Squad of the Year	Neelam Kothari, Bhavna Pandey, Maheep Kapoor, Seema Sajdeh
Super Glam Sports Star of the Year	Sania Mirza
Trailblazing Fashion Designer of the Year	Anamika Khanna

=== 2024 ===
Winners of the third edition (2024) of the Pinkvilla Screen and Style Icons Awards:

Best Film (Popular Choice)	Best Film (Jury's Choice)
OMG 2 – Cape of Good Films, Viacom18 Studios, Wakaoo Films; 12th Fail – Vinod Chopra Films, Zee Studios; Animal – T-Series Films, Cine1 Studios, Bhadrakali Pictures; Jawan – Red Chillies Entertainment; Pathaan – Yash Raj Films; Rocky Aur Rani Kii Prem Kahaani – Dharma Productions, Viacom18 Studios	12th Fail – Vinod Chopra Films, Zee Studios; Animal – T-Series Films, Cine1 Studios, Bhadrakali Pictures; Jawan – Red Chillies Entertainment; OMG 2 – Cape of Good Films, Viacom18 Studios, Wakaoo Films; Pathaan – Yash Raj Films; Rocky Aur Rani Kii Prem Kahaani – Dharma Productions, Viacom18 Studios
Best Actor (Popular Choice)	Best Actor (Jury's Choice)
Ranbir Kapoor – Animal as Ranvijay Singh and Aziz Haque; Ranveer Singh – Rocky Aur Rani Kii Prem Kahaani; Kartik Aaryan – Satyaprem Ki Katha; Shah Rukh Khan – Jawan; Sunny Deol – Gadar 2; Vicky Kaushal – Sam Bahadur	Vikrant Massey – 12th Fail as Manoj Kumar Sharma; Abhishek Bachchan – Ghoomer; Manoj Bajpayee – Joram; Rajkumar Rao – Bheed; Pankaj Tripathi– OMG 2; Vicky Kaushal – Sam Bahadur
Best Actress (Popular Choice)	Best Actress (Jury's Choice)
Kiara Advani – Satyaprem Ki Katha as Katha Kapadia; Alia Bhatt – Rocky Aur Rani Kii Prem Kahaani; Shraddha Kapoor – Tu Jhoothi Main Makkaar; Deepika Padukone – Pathaan; Nayantara – Jawan	Medha Shankar – 12th Fail as Shraddha Joshi; Alia Bhatt – Rocky Aur Rani Kii Prem Kahaani; Kiara Advani – Satyaprem Ki Katha; Adah Sharma – The Kerala Story; Yami Gautam Dhar – OMG 2; Saiyami Kher – Ghoomer
Best Actor In A Negative Role	Best Actor In A Comic Role
Bobby Deol – Animal	Ayushmann Khurrana – Dream Girl 2
Best Supporting Actor	Best Supporting Actress
Angad Bedi – Ghoomer	Shabana Azmi – Rocky Aur Rani Kii Prem Kahaani
Best Director (Popular Choice)	Best Director (Jury's Choice)
Atlee – Jawan	Karan Johar – Rocky Aur Rani Kii Prem Kahaani
Best Debut Actor (Popular Choice)	Best Debut Actress (Popular Choice)
Vedang Raina – Archies	Alizeh Agnihotri – Farrey

Category	Name
Fan Favorite Superstar	Shraddha Kapoor
Stylish Action Star	Tiger Shroff
Designer of The Year	Manish Malhotra
Trendsetter of The Year	Mrunal Thakur
Most Stylish Couple	Jackky Bhagnani & Rakul Preet Singh
Timeless Fashion Icon	Karisma Kapoor
Versatile Personality	Manish Paul
Stylish Game Changer	Disha Patani
Stylish Fitness Icon	Shilpa Shetty
Stylish Glam Star	Vaani Kapoor
Fashion Forward Star	Arjun Kapoor
Stylish Haute Stepper	Shehnaaz Gill
Stylish POP DIVA	Sophie Choudry
Stylish Risk Taker	Neha Dhupia
Best TV Actor Male	Dilip Joshi
Best TV Actor Female	Rupali Ganguly
Stylish TV Actor Male	Mohsin Khan
Stylish TV Actor Female	Ankita Lokhande
Stylish TV Couple	Ankit Gupta & Priyanka Choudhary

=== 2025 ===
Winners of the fourth edition (2025) of the Pinkvilla Screen and Style Icons Awards:

=== 2026 ===
Winners of the fifth edition (2026) of the Pinkvilla Screen and Style Icons Awards:

=== Film edition ===
Category	Name
Best Dialogue	Milap Zaveri
Best Lyrics	Irshad Kamil
Musical Powerhouse	Shaan
Best Producer	Dinesh Vijan
Best Music Composer	Faheem Abdullah, Arslan Nizami and Tanishk Bagchi
Best Debut Director	Karan Singh Tyagi
Best Film (Jury)	Kesari Chapter 2
Best Director (Jury)	Mohit Suri
Best Actor Female (Jury)	Yami Gautam
Best Actor Male (Jury)	Akshay Kumar
Special Award Best Film (Jury)	Homebound
Best Screenplay	Aditya Dhar, Shivkumar V. Panicker and Ojas Gautam
Best Playback Singer Female	Shreya Ghoshal
Best Playback Singer Male	Faheem Abdullah
Best Director (Popular Choice)	Aditya Dhar
Best Actor in a Comic Role	Riteish Deshmukh
Best Actor Male (Popular Choice)	Vicky Kaushal
Best Actor Female (Popular Choice)	Kriti Sanon
Best Supporting Actor Male	Rakesh Bedi
Best Actor in a Negative Role	Arjun Rampal and Akshaye Khanna
Best Debut Male	Ahaan Panday
Best Debut Female	Aneet Padda
Best Film (Popular Choice)	Dhurandhar and Saiyaara
Breakthrough Performance Of The Year	Ishaan Khatter
Best Supporting Actor Male	Vineet Kumar Singh
Best Supporting Actor Female	Ananya Panday
Best BGM	Shashwat Sachdev (Dhurandhar)
Best Music Album	Saiyaara
Best Cinematography	Vikash Nowlakha (Dhurandhar)

=== Style edition ===
Category	Name
Fashion Icon of the Year	Kiara Advani
Stylish Entrepreneur of the Year	Shilpa Shetty
Timeless Fashion Icon Male	Suniel Shetty
Best Reality Show Personality - Male	Amaal Mallik
Best Reality Show Personality - Female	Jasmin Bhasin
Most Stylish Actor TV	Gaurav Khanna
Most Stylish Emerging Actor	Aaishvary Thackeray
Stylish Rising Force	Ahan Shetty
Stylish Creator	Prajakta Koli
Style Sensation	Shehnaaz Gill
Stylish Filmmaker	Kiran Rao
Most Stylish Couple of the Year TV	Nakuul Mehta and Jankee Mehta
Stylish Glam Star	Disha Patani
Stylish Mould-Breaker Female	Shriya Saran
Stylish Mould-Breaker Male	Ali Fazal
Super Stylish Pathbreaker Of The Year	Rakul Preet Singh
