= Zero se Restart =

Indian documentary film

- Directed by: Jaskunwar Kohli
- Written by: Jaskunwar Kohli
- Screenplay by: Jaskunwar Kohli
- Produced by: Vidhu Vinod Chopra; Yogesh Ishwar
- Starring: Sanjay Bishnoi; Vidhu Vinod Chopra; Vikrant Massey; Medha Shankr
- Music by: Shantanu Moitra
- Production company: Vinod Chopra Films
- Release date: 13 December 2024
- Running time: 73 minutes
- Country: India
- Language: Hindi

Zero se Restart is an Indian Hindi-language Drama film. It is directed by Jaskunwar Kohli and produced by Vidhu Vinod Chopra, co-produced by Yogesh Ishwar. It stars are Sanjay Bishnoi, Vidhu Vinod Chopra, Vikrant Massey, and Medha Shankr.

== Plot ==
A documentary of the making of 12th Fail.

== Cast ==
- Sanjay Bishnoi
- Vidhu Vinod Chopra
- Vikrant Massey
- Medha Shankr

== Release ==
The film was set to be released in theaters on 13 December 2024. The trailer was released by Times of India.
