= Medha Shankr =

Indian actress

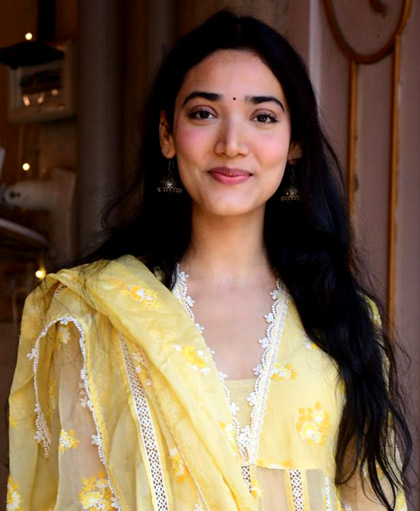
- Shankr in 2024
- Born: 1 August 1993 (age 33); Noida, Uttar Pradesh, India
- Education: National Institute of Fashion Technology Maharaja Agrasen College, University of Delhi
- Occupation: Actress
- Years active: 2015–present

Medha Shankr (born 1 August 1993) is an Indian actress who is known for her works in Hindi films. Shankr made her acting debut with the British miniseries Beecham House (2019) and followed it with few supporting parts. She achieved her breakthrough with the biographical drama 12th Fail (2023), which won her the Zee Cine Award for Best Female Debut.

== Early life ==
Shankr was born and brought up in Noida, Uttar Pradesh. Shankr is a trained Hindustani classical singer. She completed her master's degree in Fashion Management from National Institute of Fashion Technology, Delhi.

== Career ==
Shankr made her acting debut in 2019, with the British television series Beecham House, where she portrayed Roshanara. Shankr then made her film debut in 2021, with Shaadisthan, a Hindi teen musical film. Shrishti Negi of News18 opined, "Medha channels a teenager’s vulnerabilities and simmering frustrations with utmost honesty". That same year, she portrayed the youngest sibling, Eshwari, in the streaming series Dil Bekaraar, which received positive reviews from critics.

In 2022, Shankr portrayed Minara, a girl who dumps her boyfriend for an older man in Max, Min and Meowzaki. The film received critical acclaim at various film festivals. In 2023, Shankr portrayed Shraddha Joshi, an UKPSC officer in the drama film 12th Fail, opposite Vikrant Massey. Bhavna Agarwal of India Today noted, "Medha Shankr as Shraddha, has a defined part as well, and she is the crutch that helps with lighter moments in the film". Anuj Kumar of The Hindu stated that Shankr impresses with her "poise and warmth". The film emerged as a sleeper hit. It proved to be her breakthrough and earned her wider recognition.

Following a three-year hiatus, Shankr played Ginny, a fiesty woman who goes into an arrange marriage setup through a web of lies, in Ginny Wedss Sunny 2 opposite Avinash Tiwary. Rishab Suri noted that she plays her part sincerely but her character required "a bit more spark." The film failed commercially.

== Filmography ==
=== Films ===
| † | Denotes films that have not yet been released |

| Year | Title | Role | Notes | Ref. |
|---|---|---|---|---|
| 2015 | With You for You Always | Maya | Short film | |
| 2021 | Shaadisthan | Arshi Modi | | |
| 2023 | 12th Fail | Shraddha Joshi | Also playback singer for the song "Bolo Na" (Film Version) | |
| 2026 | Ginny Wedss Sunny 2 | Geetanjali "Ginny" Goenka | | |
| 2026 | Max, Min & Meowzaki | Minara "Min" Hussain | | |
| TBA | Golmaal 5 † | TBA | Completed | |

=== Television ===
| Year | Title | Role | Notes | Ref. |
|---|---|---|---|---|
| 2019 | Beecham House | Roshanara | British TV series | |
| 2021 | Dil Bekaraar | Eshwari Thakur | | |
| 2026 | India's Got Latent | Herself | Guest judge on panel | |

=== Documentary ===
| Year | Title | Role | Ref. |
|---|---|---|---|
| 2024 | Zero se Restart | Shraddha Joshi | |

== Awards and nominations ==
| Year | Award | Category | Film | Result | Ref. |
|---|---|---|---|---|---|
| 2024 | Zee Cine Awards | Best Female Debut | 12th Fail | Won | |
| 2024 | Pinkvilla Screen and Style Icons Awards | Best Actress – Jury Choice | 12th Fail | Won | |
