= Mukherjee (disambiguation) =

Mukherjee is an Indian surname.

Mukherjee may also refer to:

- Mukherjee-Samarth family, Bengali-Marathi family within the Hindi film industry
- Mukherjee Nagar, Neighborhood in North West Delhi, India
- Mukherjee Dar Bou, 2019 Indian Bengali-language film
