= Switchh =

2021 Indian film by Mustufa Raj

- Release Poster
- Directed by: Mustufa Raj
- Written by: Jaahan Kaur; Mustufa Raj
- Produced by: Vinod Adnani
- Starring: Naren Kumar; Vikrant Massey; Madhua Sneha
- Cinematography: Sunil Patel
- Edited by: Asif Ali Shaikh
- Music by: Bappi Lahiri; Amaal Mallik
- Production company: Nine Hope Productions
- Distributed by: Eros Now
- Release date: 23 April 2021
- Running time: 130 minutes
- Country: India
- Language: Hindi

Switchh (stylised as SWITCHH) is a 2021 Indian Hindi-language action thriller film directed by Mustufa Raj starring Vikrant Massey. It was produced by Nine Hope Productions and released digitally on Eros Now.

== Premise ==
Three con artists use their charm to dupe wealthy victims out of cash.

== Cast ==
- Vikrant Massey as Sam
- Naren Kumar as Neil Rai
- Tanvi Vyas as Ruheena
- Madhua Sneha as Myra
- Hanif Hilal as Pacha
- Armen Grayg

== Reception ==
Ronak Kotecha of The Times of India gave it a poor review with 2 stars saying, "‘Switchh’ has been in the making for years and director Mustafa Raj makes no attempt to upgrade his product in any way". Akhila Damodaran of OTT Play wrote that "The film, directed by Mustufa Raj, is poorly executed and drags for over two hours with over-the-top twists in the story".
