= Nafisa Ali =

Indian actress and model

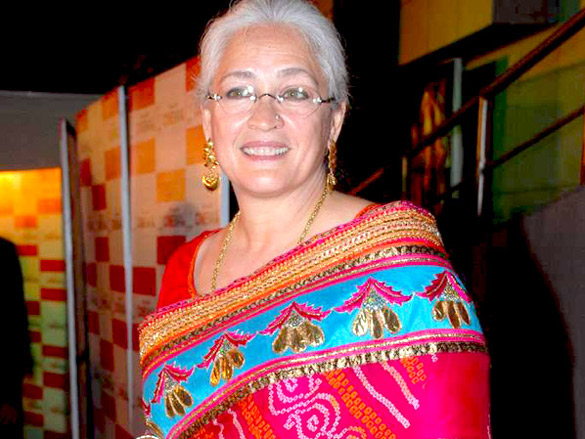
- Nafisa Ali at the premiere of the film Lahore
- Born: Kolkata, West Bengal, India
- Other name: Nafisa Ali Sodhi
- Occupations: Actress; model; politician
- Years active: 1978–present
- Political party: Trinamool Congress (2021–present)
- Other political affiliations: Indian National Congress; Samajwadi Party
- Spouse: R. S. Sodhi

Nafisa Ali (Bengali pronunciation: [ˈnafiˌsa ˈali]) is an Indian actress, politician, social activist and beauty pageant titleholder. She won the Eve’s Weekly Miss India title and represented India at the Miss International pageant, where she was the second runner-up. She earned critical acclaim for her performances in films such as Junoon and Life in a... Metro. She is also a member of All India Trinamool Congress.

== Early and personal life ==
Nafisa Ali was born in Kolkata, the daughter of Ahmed Ali, a Bengali man and Philomena Torresan, a woman of Anglo-Indian heritage. Nafisa's paternal grandfather, S. Wajid Ali, was a Bengali writer. Her paternal aunt (father's sister) was Zaib-un-Nissa Hamidullah, a Pakistani journalist. Nafisa is also related to the Bangladeshi freedom fighter and soldier Bir Pratik Akhtar Ahmed. Nafisa's mother later moved to Australia. She is married to Colonel Ravinder Singh Sodhi, a polo player who won the Arjuna Award. After marriage, she chose to stop working and focus on their children: daughters Armana and Pia and son Ajit.

In November 2018, Ali was diagnosed with stage 3 peritoneal and ovarian cancer. After a later recurrence, she was diagnosed with stage 4 cancer, entering her third remission by July 2026.

== Education ==
Nafisa attended La Martiniere Calcutta, where she was a House Captain. She has also studied vedanta taught by Swami Chinmayananda, who started the Chinmaya Centre of World Understanding (Chinmaya Mission).

== Career ==
=== Sports and fashion ===
Nafisa Ali has accomplishments in several fields. She was the national swimming champion from 1972 to 1974. In 1976, she won the Eve's Weekly Miss India title, represented India at the Miss International contest & was declared the 2nd runner-up. Ali was also a jockey at the Calcutta Gymkhana in 1979.

=== Acting ===
She has acted in several Bollywood films, the notable ones being Junoon (1979) with Shashi Kapoor, Major Saab (1998) with Amitabh Bachchan, Bewafaa (2005), Life In A... Metro (2007), Guzaarish (2010) and Yamla Pagla Deewana (2011) with Dharmendra.She also acted in a Malayalam film called Big B (2007) with Mammootty.

=== Politics ===
Nafisa Ali contested the 2004 Lok Sabha elections unsuccessfully from South Kolkata. On 5 April 2009, she contested the Lok Sabha election from Lucknow on the Samajwadi Party ticket after Sanjay Dutt's disqualification by the Supreme Court on the basis of a prior conviction. She then rejoined the Indian National Congress party in November 2009 and said she is returning to Congress for life. However, she joined the All India Trinamool Congress in October 2021 ahead of the 2022 Goa Legislative Assembly election.

=== Public roles ===
In September 2005, she was appointed the chairperson of the Children's Film Society of India (CFSI).

== Social work ==
She also associated with Action India, an organisation working to spread AIDS awareness.

== Filmography ==
- Junoon (1979)
- Kshatriya (1993)
- Aatank (1996)
- Major Saab (1998)
- Yeh Zindagi Ka Safar (2001)
- Bewafaa (2005) as Amisha Verma
- Godfather: The Legend Continues (2007)
- Big B (2007) as Mary teacher
- Life in a... Metro (2008)
- Guzaarish (2010)
- Pakistan (2010)
- Yamla Pagla Deewana (2011)
- Saheb, Biwi Aur Gangster 3 (2018) as Rajmata Yashodhara
- Max, Min & Meowzaki (2022) as Jennifer Sequera
- Uunchai (2022)

== See also ==
- List of Indian women athletes

Awards and achievements
Preceded by Maharashtra – Indira Bredemeyer	Eve's Weekly Miss India; 1976	Succeeded by Maharashtra – Joan Stephens
Preceded by India – Indira Bredemeyer	Miss International; 2nd Runner-up; 1976	Succeeded by Indonesia – Indri Hapsari Soeharto
