= Road to Sangam =

2010 Indian film

- Theatrical poster
- Directed by: Amit Rai
- Written by: Amit Rai
- Produced by: Amit Chheda
- Starring: Paresh Rawal; Om Puri; Pawan Malhotra; Javed Shaikh; Swati Chitnis
- Cinematography: Dharam Gulati
- Music by: Nitin Kumar Gupta; Prem Haria and Vijay Mishra as "VINAY"
- Distributed by: Shethia Audio Video Productions
- Release dates: October 2009 (Asian Film Festival, Mumbai); 29 January 2010 (India)
- Running time: 135 minutes
- Country: India
- Language: Hindi

Road to Sangam is a 2010 Bollywood film written and directed by Amit Rai. The film features Bollywood actors Paresh Rawal, Om Puri and Pawan Malhotra.

Road to Sangam is a simple story of a God fearing, devout Muslim mechanic named Hasmat Ullah (Paresh Rawal) who has been entrusted with the job of repairing an old Ford V8 engine, not knowing the historic significance – that it once carried the ashes of Mahatma Gandhi which were immersed in the holy Triveni Sangam.

The film was released worldwide on 29 January 2010.

== Plot ==
Hashmatullah (Hashmat) is a God-fearing, devout Muslim mechanic of Allahabad, Uttar Pradesh. He is to repair an old Ford V8 lorry engine, the historic significance he is unaware -– it carried the ashes of Mahatma Gandhi after Gandhi's assassination in 1948. As part of the funerary celebration, the ashes were immersed in the holy Triveni Sangam, Allahabad, divided into 20 portions, sent to different provinces of India, brought back, and then dispersed in Triveni Sangam.

One of the portions is found years later forgotten in the Orissa State Bank. Gandhi's grandson makes an application to the Orissa High Court for their return. The government honours Gandhi by having the ashes repeat the procession of 1948. The original lorry is found, a news channel reporter visits, and Hashmat learns about the historic significance of the engine he is to repair.

There has been a terrorist bomb blast in three court houses of Lucknow, Varanasi and Faizabad in Uttar Pradesh. The Uttar Pradesh Police arrests suspects who have links with the terror organisation Hizb-ul-Mujahideen) and the Muslim neighbourhood of Allahabad, where Hashmat lives. Hashmat is General Secretary of the Managing Committee of the main Mosque of Allahabad (Masjid-e-Azam). The Mosque Committee protests at the court house the arrests of the suspects. Protestors enter the court despite the beatings by the police with canes (lathi charge).

One Muslim protester, while trying to scale the boundary wall of the court house, dies in an accident. He is the nephew of Chairman of the Mosque Committee Nawab Kasuri. Infuriated Nawab Kasuri supported by Maulana of the Mosque Masjid-e-Azam calls for a Bandh. Hashmat has a quandary: support the bandh or return to Mr Rizvi a fixed Ford lorry. Rizvi works with the Government of Uttar Pradesh. He seeks out Mr. Rizvi at the museum where Mr. Rizvi works; Mr. Rizvi is not available.

Hashmat learns that Mahatma Gandhi led his life fighting for the safety of Muslims during Partition. He seeks permission of the Mosque Committee to repair the engine since the purpose is connected with Gandhi. Muslims considered a traitor. The Mosque Committee insults and rebukes him. His family and friends turn against him. He is intimidated and assaulted but he carries on with his work eventually winning over hearts of his fellow Muslims with Gandhian values and methods.

The film allegedly displays the split personality of Indian Muslims through irrational symbolism. In a scene, right in the beginning of the film, some Muslims are shown praising the Pakistan national cricket team and its famous players like Shahid Afridi and Javed Miandad insinuating towards the support which Pakistan National Cricket Team enjoys over the India national cricket team in Muslim neighbourhoods of India. In contrast, the main protagonist Hashmatullah (portrayed as a moderate patriot Muslim) praises Sachin Tendulkar in the same scene. In a scene, it is shown how aristocrats are ruling the Muslim community with an iron fist. Nawab Kasuri (Om Puri) is angry with Hashmat and his family because Hashmat's late elder brother, who was once an employee in Nawab Kasuri's household, had contested an election against him for the Chairmanship of the Mosque Committee. Because a former employee dared to contest election against him the aristocrat bears a grudge against him for life. In many scenes, ordinary Muslims are seen fearing the aristocrat- Nawab Kasuri. In one argument, Hashmat asks his fellow shopkeepers, would they have not allowed him to work if this work was for cause of a Muslim personality, (and after a pause he says) like Jinnah. Hashmat sees Gandhi as one of his own not as a Hindu leader, and that is why he makes his work his cause, whereas for other Muslims Mosque's order is above any cause.

== Cast ==
- Paresh Rawal - Hasmat Ullah
- Om Puri - Nawab Mohammad Ali Kasuri
- Pawan Malhotra - Maulana Qureshi
- Javed Shaikh - Dr. Banerjee
- Swati Chitnis - Aara, Hasmat's wife
- Vijay Mishra - Rafaat, Hasmat's son
- Rajan Bhise - Shaukat
- Masood Akhtar - Zulfiqar
- Yusuf Hussain - Gaffar

== Awards and accolades ==
- 9th Annual International Film Festival (South Africa), 2 – 8 November 2009 - (best first film director)
- 5th Annual Macon Film Festival (US), 17 – 21 February 2010 - (best film)
- 11th Annual MAMI (Mumbai Film Festival) (India), 29 October – 5 November 2009 - (audience choice)
- 2nd Annual Radar Hamburg International Independent Film Festival (Germany), 2 – 7 November 2009 - (best film)
- 1st annual Los Angeles Reel Film Festival (US), 30 December 2009 (3rd place for best film, best original score and production design)
- The Gollapudi Srinivas National Award for best debutant director (Chennai, India), 2009
- 6th annual White Sands International Film Festival (US), 15 – 18 April 2010 (feature length narrative)
- 4th annual Mexico International Film Festival (Mexico), 21 – 23 May 2010 (Silver Palm Award)
- 10th annual Nickel Independent Film Festival (Canada), 22 – 26 June (best drama)
- 1st annual London Indian Film Festival (UK), 18 July 2010 (audience choice)
- 7th edition Bollywood and Beyond Indian film festival (Stuttgart, Germany), 21 – 25 July 2010 (director's vision)
- 1st annual Jagran Film Festival (North India), 5 June – 28 August 2010 (Paresh Rawal for best actor, best director and jury award)
- 17th annual Star Screen Awards (Mumbai, India), 6 January 2011 (best story)
- 17th annual Lions Golden Awards (Mumbai, India), 11 January 2011 (Lions Favourite International Acclaimed Film and Paresh Rawal for best actor)

Official selection and nomination in festivals worldwide:

- Third Eye Asian Film Festival (Mumbai, India) 8–15 October 2009
- International Film Festival Ahmedabad (Gujarat, India)
- 11th annual Bare Bones International Film Festival (US) 15 – 25 April 2010
- 20th annual Cinequest Film Festival (US) 23 February – 7 March 2010
- Ekwa (Reunion Island) 22 – 28 October 2009
- International Film Festival (Egypt) 4 – 8 April 2010
- International Forum of New Cinema (Kolkata, India) 13 – 19 November 2009
- Kerala Film Festival (Kerala, India)
- Memphis International (US) 22 – 25 April 2010
- Swansea Bay Film Festival (UK) 7 – 16 May 2010
- 3rd annual International Festival of Independent Cinema Off Plus Camera (Poland) 16 – 26 April 2010
- 15th annual Trivandrum International Film Festival (Kerala, India), 30 July – 5 August 2010
- 3rd annual Indie Spirit Film Festival (US) 23 – 25 April 2010
- 7th annual Salento International Film Festival (Italy), 3 – 12 September 2010
- Norway Bollywood Film Festival (Oslo, Norway) 10 – 17 September 2010
- Yes India Film Festival (Wellington, New Zealand) 7 – 10 October 2010
- Yes India Film Festival (Auckland, New Zealand) 28 – 31 October
- 17th Star Screen Awards (India)
- Stardust Awards (India)
- 56th Film Fare (India) 29 January 2010
- 4th annual Hidden Gems Film Festival (Alberta, Canada) 29 January 2012

== Production ==
Amit Rai first formed the idea for the film when he read a story about the restoration of the truck that carried Mahatma Gandhi's ashes to the Sangam by a Muslim mechanic. After he read about Gandhi's ashes being unearthed in an Orissa bank vault, he decided to write a script based on the idea. To prepare for his role as an orthodox Maulvi, Pawan Malhotra watched Urdu language channels. The film was shot on location in Allahabad. Tushar Gandhi makes a cameo appearance in the film and many of the secondary characters are non-actor residents of Allahabad.

== Marketing ==
In a unique gesture, the Indian Post & Telegraphs Department issued special envelopes on the release of the film. They also put up posters and advertisements in all the post offices in the country.

== Music ==
The music has been primarily given by two young directors - Nitin Kumar Gupta and Prem Haria. Actor Vijay Vidyadhar Mishra also composed three songs with taking name of "Vinay" He also sung a Kawwali in this film. The 500-year-old song "Vaisnav Jan", which was a favourite of Gandhi, has been rearranged for this film. The music received the award for Best Foreign Film Original Score at Los Angeles Reel Film Festival.
