= Max, Min & Meowzaki =

2026 Indian Hindi language film

- Directed by: Padmakumar Narasimhamurthy
- Story by: Amit Rai
- Produced by: Shael Oswal; Samiksha Oswal; Naveen Kwatra
- Starring: Medha Shankr; Siddharth Menon; Adil Hussain; Mandira Bedi; Vidhatri Bandi
- Cinematography: Nikhil Arolkar
- Edited by: Satyajeet Kelkar
- Music by: Nitin Dubey; Anandh Ranganathan
- Production company: SSO Productions
- Release date: 24 July 2026
- Running time: 138 minutes
- Country: India
- Language: Hindi

Max, Min & Meowzaki is a 2026 Indian Hindi-language romance comedy film directed by Padmakumar Narasimhamurthy. The film stars Adil Hussain, Medha Shankr, Siddharth Menon, Nassar, Mandira Bedi, Vidhatri Bandi, and Nafisa Ali. The film was released on 24 July 2026.

== Plot ==
Three generations of Mahadevan men suddenly find themselves single. As they try to move on, they find hope and delight in unexpected feminine encounters that help them heal and find their way back to each other in the quirkiest ways, with a gorgeous cat adding to all the charm and fun.

== Cast ==
- Adil Hussain as Ramesh Mahadevan
- Medha Shankr as Minara "Min" Hussain
- Siddharth Menon
- Nassar as Sridhar Mahadevan
- Mandira Bedi as Dhaara
- Vidhatri Bandi as Carol Sequera
- Nafisa Ali as Jennifer Sequera

== Reception ==
Dhaval Roy of The Times of India wrote in a review "Max, Min & Meowzaki is a warm, gentle coming-of-age romance that treats young love and heartbreak with sensitivity. It makes for an endearing, feel-good watch for viewers who enjoy quiet, heartfelt slice-of-life storytelling." Rahul Desai of The Hollywood Reporter India wrote in a review "Even in the cast, only Siddharth Menon, Adil Hussain and Nasser are afforded enough space to land a performance. In keeping with the film's priorities, maybe it should've been Mahesh, Ramesh & Sridhar." Nandini Ramnath of Scroll.in wrote in a review "Max, Min & Meowzaki is a thoughtful and sensitive drama that navigates heartbreak, healing, and generational ties with quiet sincerity. It offers a gentle, engaging journey of self-discovery."

== External link ==
Max, Min & Meowzaki at IMDb
