= Ohh My Dog =

2026 Indian film

- Theatrical release poster
- Directed by: Amit Rai
- Story by: Amit Rai
- Produced by: Rajesh Bhardwaj; Amit Rai; Sana Warsi
- Starring: Pankaj Tripathi; Rajesh Kumar; Geeta Agarwal Sharma; Pawan Malhotra; Vijay Mishra; Shreedhar Dubey
- Cinematography: Máté Herbai
- Edited by: Suvir Nath
- Music by: Mangesh Dhakde; Aman Pant
- Production companies: Babulal Biscope; Thinking Hat Entertainment Solutions
- Distributed by: AA Films
- Release date: 7 August 2026
- Running time: 141 minutes
- Country: India
- Language: Hindi
- Budget: ₹8–25 crore
- Box office: ₹5.09 crore

Ohh My Dog is a 2026 Indian Hindi-language drama film directed by Amit Rai. It was produced by Rajesh Bhardwaj, Amit Rai and Sana Warsi. The film stars Pankaj Tripathi, Rajesh Kumar, Geeta Agarwal Sharma, Pawan Malhotra Vijay Mishra and Shreedhar Dubey. It was theatrically released in India on 7 August 2026.

== Plot ==
The film follows two parallel narratives in India. One centers on a boy in Patna attempting to rescue a dog, while the other involves a boy in Assam making similar efforts.

== Cast ==
- Pankaj Tripathi as Master Ji
- Rajesh Kumar as police inspector
- Geeta Agarwal Sharma as Appu's Mother
- Vijay Mishra as SHO Mohammad Abu Hazari
- Maahi Rai as Appu
- Sulakhyana Baruah as Krishna
- Javed Khan as King
- Nikhil Kumar as Prince
- Shreedhar Dubey as Maqadam
- Bruno as Oscar

== Release ==
It was about to release on 31 July, 2026, but it was postponed and released on 7 August, 2026.

== Reception ==
On the review aggregator website Rotten Tomatoes, 90% of 10 critics' reviews are positive, with an average rating of 5.9/10.

Saibal Chatterjee writing for NDTV gave a rating of 3/5, and added, “Watch the film if you love dogs and especially if you don't.” Sana Farzeen, writing for India Today gave it 3/5 stars and added “For animal lovers, especially dog people, there are enough moments to leave you teary-eyed one minute and smiling the next.” Renuka Vyavahare writing for The Times of India rated it at 3/5 and remarked, “You don't need to be a dog parent or even a pet lover to empathise with animals. Compassion and kindness are universal. That's what makes Ohh My Dog a film made for everyone, even if it doesn't fully realise the potential of its heartfelt premise.”

Rahul Desai of The Hollywood Reporter India writes that “It is cute in parts, but almost a ruff day”. Nandini Ramnath of Scroll.in said that “Ohh My Dog spells out every move that proves how a kid can make instant sense of a complex kidnapping operation and how a dog can sniff out the truth about its owner entirely by itself.” Bollywood Hungama gave it 3 stars out of 5 and said that “Ohh My Dog is an endearing and unusual entertainer that scores with its adorable canine hero, engaging performances and several thrilling, clapworthy moments.”
