= Vikas Divyakirti =

Indian educator (born 1973)

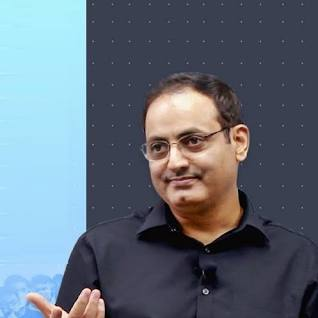
- Born: 26 December 1973 (age 52); Bhiwani, Haryana, India
- Education: Delhi University (BA, MA, LLB, MPhil, PhD)
- Occupations: Teacher; former civil servant; entrepreneur
- Known for: Co-founding Drishti IAS
- Spouse: Taruna Verma (m. 1997)
- Children: 1

YouTube information
- Channel: Vikas Divyakirti
- Years active: 2022–present
- Subscribers: 4.47 million
- Views: 172 million
- Last updated: 3 August 2026

Vikas Divyakirti (born 26 December 1973) is an Indian educator, author, lecturer, and former civil servant. He is the founder and coaching head of Drishti IAS, a UPSC coaching institute based in Delhi.

== Early life and education ==
Divyakirti was born on 26 December 1973 in Bhiwani, Haryana. He studied at Zakir Husain Delhi College and later at the University of Delhi, where he completed degrees in commerce, history, and Hindi literature.

He later obtained a Bachelor of Laws degree and completed Master of Philosophy and Doctor of Philosophy in Hindi literature from the University of Delhi.

== Career ==
Divyakirti began his career as a teacher at colleges affiliated with the University of Delhi.

In 1996, He cleared the UPSC Civil Services Examination and got All India Rank (AIR) of 384. He joined the Central Secretariat Service of the Government of India and served as section officer at Department of Official Language in Ministry of Home Affairs in New Delhi, and resigned four months later.

In 1999, he founded Drishti IAS in Mukherjee Nagar, Delhi.

In 2022, he started a YouTube channel focused on educational content. In 2023, he appeared as himself in the film 12th Fail and contributed to its script.

== Personal life ==
Divyakirti is married to Taruna Verma and has one child.

He comes from a family associated with the Arya Samaj and has expressed views identifying as an agnostic.

== Controversies ==
In 2022, Divyakirti faced criticism over remarks related to the Ramayana. He later responded, stating that his comments were based on interpretations of texts.

In July 2024, a basement of they coaching institute was sealed by the Municipal Corporation of Delhi for alleged violations following a broader crackdown on coaching centres.

== Filmography ==
Year	Title	Role	Ref
2023	12th Fail	Himself	
