= Forensic (2020 film) =

2020 film by Akhil Paul and Anas Khan

- Theatrical release poster
- Directed by: Akhil Paul; Anas Khan
- Written by: Akhil Paul; Anas Khan
- Produced by: Navis Xaviour; Siju Mathew
- Starring: Tovino Thomas; Mamta Mohandas; Saiju Kurup; Renji Panicker; Reba Monica John
- Cinematography: Akhil George
- Edited by: Shameer Muhammed
- Music by: Jakes Bejoy
- Production company: Juvis Productions
- Distributed by: Century Release
- Release date: 28 February 2020
- Running time: 133 minutes
- Country: India
- Language: Malayalam

Forensic is a 2020 Indian Malayalam-language psychological mystery crime thriller film co-written and co-directed by Akhil Paul and Anas Khan (in their directorial debut). The film stars Tovino Thomas, Mamta Mohandas, Saiju Kurup, Renji Panicker, and Reba Monica John. The film was released on 28 February 2020 in India and the rest of the world, and 4 March 2020 in GCC countries.

== Plot ==
A young boy steals the organs of slaughtered animals from a local butcher and preserves them in jars underneath his bed. Upon discovering this, his father beats him. After he grows up, he plots & kills his father with a rope used to hang clothes.

Meanwhile, ACP Rithika investigates the abduction and murders of two girls from Thiruvananthapuram. No apparent motive leads to Rithika suspecting that there is a serial killer. She requests a forensic team but finds it awkward that the forensic personnel assigned is Samuel John Kattookkaaran, the younger brother of her estranged husband Xavier. The couple separated after the death of their child which was caused by Rithika's carelessness. This traumatic incident resulted in their other child Nayana attending counselling with a psychologist, Dr. Alphonse Kurien. Samuel deduces that the killer is a child as the murderer is seemingly able to move comfortably through a 4-foot tunnel but is unable to dispose of a body over a 5-foot wall, and also because the killer is able to blend easily in a compound of children.

Initially dismissive, Rithika is forced to accept Samuel's theory as an eyewitness reveals to having witnessed a boy dumping a dead body. Further victims are added to the list even as the police publish a sketch of the minor killer as described by the witness. Alphonse states the boy in the sketch seems to be a juvenile prisoner, Reuben Elias, whom he counselled a few years earlier. Clinical therapist Dr. Jayakumar Menon, who had handled Reuben's case, confirms that Reuben indeed demonstrated murderous psychopathic behaviour and escaped from him recently. Abdul Wahab, a retired SP volunteers to carry out a DNA test, which brings up a decade-old forgotten serial murder case, which also happened to be Rithika's first case.

When three girls from the Burma Colony in the outskirts of Thiruvananthapuram were murdered in succession, and the body of another was discovered in a school bus, the police arrest the bus driver Ubaid Ahmed, but he is proven innocent as another victim is kidnapped, and murdered in the same manner while he is in custody.

Samuel concludes that there is a second personality behind the child killer, likely to be a mastermind. Due to the intern Shikha's insight, it is discovered that this DNA matches perfectly with that of the Burma Colony murderer ten years earlier.

Samuel decides to examine every one of the hundreds of medical and police personnel present at the hospital during the last abduction, for which DNA samples are procured with the help of Abdul Wahab and Alphonse. Rithika zeroes in on Reuben and captures him from a church, as Samuel is baffled to find that not a single DNA from the collection matches the one on the candy wrapper. Reuben delivers apocalyptic delusions on the inquest, which is conveniently taken as a confession by Rithika and the team. Samuel, however, observes from the footage of the inquest that Reuben was in fact responding to instructions from his hearing aid, likely from the mastermind. By the time he arrives at the station, Reuben commits suicide per transmitted instructions.

When a broken Rithika is unable to handle Nayana, Samuel convinces her to let Nayana stay with Xavier for the weekend. At their residence, Samuel is informed by Shikha that a Violet Honda Civic car could be seen near the station premises in the footage around the time of Reuben's suicide. Noticing the exact model right outside his gate, Samuel proceeds to check the vehicle, only to get knocked out and abducted by Ubaid. Another kidnapping occurs, the victim being the daughter of a member of the team. Confronted with evidence proving that they were in the wrong, the team tracks the GPS of the victim's phone. In an abandoned truck in a forest, a psychotic Ubaid taunts Samuel. He plays footage of his niece and Rithika's daughter, Nayana carrying the murdered victims out of a truck.

Ubaid reveals that he framed Nayana as a serial killer as revenge for ruining his life in the Burma Colony case. This is followed by a confession from Nayana's twin sister, Navya, whom is presumably dead. She was shown a video of a dishevelled Navya confined in a basement. It is revealed that Navya actually removed the corpses of the children from the abandoned truck deep inside the forest. He taunts Samuel by swearing revenge on Rithika and her family and attempts to kill him. Despite overpowering Ubaid, Samuel is unable to extract further information about the mastermind and Ubaid is unexpectedly shot dead by someone in a Violet Honda Civic. Samuel pursues the car and is led to chase a yellow minivan, only to end up in front of the police and discover the minivan containing the body of the latest victim. Framed as the serial killer, Samuel flees but is supported by Xavier, Shikha and Abdul Wahab. They arrange a meeting with Rithika, who is forced to accept the evidence on Ubaid's phone.

Navya's location is traced to within a 500m radius of Ubaid's location, but with the sense that she will be in danger once the murderer realises that Ubaid's phone is lost. Rithika and Xavier go to the location to search for Navya, while Samuel asks Alphonse to join him to discuss the case, during which Samuel reveals to him that he knew that he was the perpetrator all along. A flashback shows that Alphonse was the boy who smuggled the organs and killed his father, but was leading a normal life for his wife. After her death he lived for his son, Naveen. However, after being diagnosed with blood cancer, he loses control of himself after dropping off his son's friend in the Burma Colony and then proceeds to take out the frustration of his illness by killing the kids in that colony.

When Rithika arrives to search the colony, he shifts his next victim from his car to a school bus parked near the road, which is accidentally witnessed by Naveen, who was in the car with him. Later in the evening, Ubaid's arrest is shown on the news, because the child was found on his bus. Naveen watches the news and realises that his father is the killer and goes to the terrace to check a room that his father keeps locked, realising that it was the room where he killed his victims. Dr. Alphonse tries to explain everything to his son who tries to get away from him and accidentally falls off the terrace and dies. Dr. Alphonse buries his son's body and kills one more child just to prove to the police the Ubaid isn't the real killer. Later, he decides to take revenge on Rithika by kidnapping her daughter and keeping her hostage. He then meets Reuben and plans to use him and Navya in his plan.

Alphonse deduces that Samuel has not handed him over to the police as he and his family would prioritise the safety of his missing niece Navya, and use it as a backup to escape from Samuel and Rithika. He also tells Samuel that they have no proof connecting him to the killings and that he had tested his blood and it wasn't a match. A flashback shows Samuel telling Shikha that Alphonse has two sets of DNA because of his bone marrow transplant - his skin and hair have his old DNA which is enough proof to tie him to the case. Rithika and Xavier find Navya.

Shocked, Alphonse wrestles and attempts to attack Samuel in the car, leading to Alphonse getting killed whilst Samuel is protected by the airbags. A few days later, Rithika applies for a 2-month leave to spend time with her family before which she will be handed a new case file for which she requests the same forensic team. It is implied that she has reconciled with her husband who spends time with both of their daughters. She calls Shikha who informs her that Samuel is in an inquiry about the accident. In the inquiry, Samuel reveals to the police about what occurred as seen earlier. Later on, it is revealed that in the midst of the fight in the car, Samuel killed Alphonse by unbuckling his seat belt, leading to him being thrown out of the car.

== Cast ==
- Tovino Thomas as Samuel John Kattookkaran
- Mamta Mohandas as ACP Rithika Xavier IPS, Samuel's sister-in-law and Xavier's wife
- Saiju Kurup as Xavier John Kattookkaran, Samuel's brother and Rithika's husband
- Reba Monica John as Shikha Damodar
- Renji Panicker as Retd. SP Abdul Wahab IPS
- Anwar Shareef as SI Murali Mohankumar
- Prathap Pothen as Dr. Jayakumar Menon
- Dhanesh Anand as Ubaid Ahmed
- Rony David as CI Dano Mamem
- Giju John as Dr. Alphonse Kurian,Child Psychologist and Burma colony serial killer(main antagonist)
- Srikant Murali as SP Isaac John IPS
- Lukman Avaran as Vinod
- Anjali Nair as Malavika's mother
- Mohan Sharma as Abraham Kattokkaran, Xavier and Samuel's father
- Thennal Abhilash as Malavika Das
- Thamanna Pramod as Nayana / Navya, Rithika and Xavier's twin daughters
- Ramu as DIG Rajeev Madhavan IPS
- Balaji Sarma as Dr. Jayan Krishna
- Anil Murali as Kurian, Alphonse's father
- Arunamshu Dev as Reuben Elias
- Sameksha Nair as Divya Divakar
- Karthik Manikandan as Sooraj
- Navis Xaviour as Alappuzha Sub Collector Rahul Nath IAS
- Devi Ajith as Burma Colony victim's mother
- Rajesh Hebbar as Burma Colony victim's father

== Marketing ==
The trailer for the film was launched on 13 February 2020.

== Release ==
=== Theatrical ===
The film was theatrically released on 28 February 2020. The film was a commercial success at the box office despite theatre shutdowns all over India due to COVID-19, collecting ₹15 crores in 13 days from Kerala alone and ₹25 crores worldwide, including satellite and other digital rights.

A Hyderabad based production house named Geetha Arts owned by Allu Aravind, bought the Telugu dubbing rights for the film. The Telugu dubbed version had a digital release on Aha. The film was also dubbed in Hindi and directly premiered on Zee Cinema on 13 May 2021.

It went on to become the highest rated Malayalam film of 2020 with a 14.67 TRP following its release on Asianet.

=== Home media ===
Forensic began streaming streaming on Netflix on 7 June 2020.

== Remake ==
A Hindi remake also titled Forensic was released on ZEE on 24 June 2022. It stars Vikrant Massey and Radhika Apte.
