= Ghich Pich =

2025 Hindi-language comedy drama

- Theatrical release poster
- Directed by: Ankur Singla
- Written by: Ankur Singla
- Produced by: Simran Dhir; Sushil Singla; Ankur Singla
- Starring: Nitesh Pandey; Satyajit Sharma; Geeta Agarwal Sharma; Shhivam Kakar; Aryan Singh Rana; Kabir Nanda
- Cinematography: Sukhan Saar Singh
- Edited by: Syed Mubashshir Ali
- Music by: Rohit Sharma; Ritwik De
- Production company: Barsaati Films
- Distributed by: Platoon Distribution
- Release date: 8 August 2025
- Running time: 92 minutes
- Country: India
- Language: Hindi

Ghich Pich is a 2025 Indian coming-of-age,Hindi comedy-drama, written and directed by Ankur Singla. The film is set in '90s Chandigarh and follows the relationship of middle-aged fathers with their sons on rebellion, insecurities, and tradition.

The film was screened at the 15th Indian Film Festival of Melbourne and was theatrically released on 8 August 2025. This marks the final performance of Nitesh Pandey who died in 2023.

== Cast ==
- Shhivam Kakar as Gaurav Arora
- Nitesh Pandey as Rakesh Arora
- Satyajit Sharma as Naresh Bansal
- Geeta Agarwal Sharma as Ritu Arora
- Aryan Singh Rana as Anurag Bansal
- Kabir Nanda as Gurpreet Singh

== Production ==
Ghich Pich marks the directorial debut of Ankur Singla under the Barsaati Films banner, an independent studio based in Delhi. The film was shot across 13 locations in and around Chandigarh.

== Release ==
Ghich Pich premiered at the CineVesture International Film Festival in March 2025, The theatrical release of Ghich Pich was initially scheduled for 1 August, but was later rescheduled to 8 August.

== Reception ==
Abhishek Srivastava of Times of India gave the film 3.5/5 rating, writing "For a film named 'Ghich Pich' (which loosely suggests confusion or entanglement), it's surprisingly cohesive, a well-structured, well-performed slice-of-life drama that knows exactly what it wants to say".

Rahul Desai from The Hollywood Reporter praised the film as " present and alive to its period, liberated from the reverse-engineered designs of unlearning the trappings of the social media generation".

Anuj Kumar of The Hindu praised Ghich Pich as a heartfelt coming-of-age story that captures the angst of adolescence with honesty and restraint. Kumar noted how Singla evokes the nostalgia of 90s Chandigarh without letting it overpower the film.

Outlook India's Sritama Bhattacharyya noted that Ghich Pich has the "skeletal structure of brilliance is there, the exposition has momentum, the conflict is carefully developed, and there’s also investment in the character development." but "decides to drop the action, resolving it almost with bathetic haste; as if the film flinched under its own emotional weight".

Devesh Sharma of Filmfare rated Ghich Pich 3.5/5, describing it as a "bittersweet turbulence of adolescence with a rare blend of tenderness and authenticity".
