= Blackout (2024 film) =

2024 Indian film by Devang Shashin Bhavsar

- Official release poster
- Directed by: Devang Shashin Bhavsar
- Written by: Story & Screenplay: Devang Shashin Bhavsar; Dialogues: Abbas Dalal; Hussain Dalal
- Produced by: Jyoti Deshpande; Niraj Kothari
- Starring: Vikrant Massey; Mouni Roy; Ruhani Sharma; Sunil Grover; Jisshu Sengupta
- Cinematography: Anubhav Bansal
- Edited by: Unnikrishnan Payoor Parameswaran
- Music by: Songs: Vishal Mishra; Background Score: John Stewart Eduri
- Production companies: 11:11 Productions; Jio Studios
- Distributed by: JioCinema
- Release date: 7 June 2024
- Running time: 116 minutes
- Country: India
- Language: Hindi

Blackout is a 2024 Hindi-language comedy thriller film directed by Devang Shashin Bhavsar and produced by Jyoti Deshpande and Niraj Kothari. It stars Vikrant Massey, Ruhani Sharma, Sunil Grover, Mouni Roy, Jisshu Sengupta, Anant Vijay Joshi, Prasad Oak, Kelly Dorji and others. The film was released on 7 June 2024 on JioCinema, to mixed reviews from critics.

== Cast ==
- Vikrant Massey as Lenny D’Souza
- Sunil Grover as Bewdya / Asgar Don
- Mouni Roy as Shruti Mehra / Pinky
- Jisshu Sengupta as Detective Arvind Dasgupta
- Karan Sudhakar Sonawane as Thik
- Saurabh Dilip Ghadge as Thak
- Ruhani Sharma as Roshni D’Souza
- Anant Vijay Joshi as Ravi
- Prasad Oak as Inspector Patil
- Chhaya Raghunath Kadam as MLA Anita Naik
- Sooraj Pops as Mugil Anna
- Kelly Dorjee as Mr. X / Sharpshooter
- Anil Kapoor as Narrator
- Bhuvan Arora as Max
- Manas Parekh As Watchman

== Music ==
The soundtrack is composed and written by Vishal Mishra. The Background Score is composed by John Stewart Eduri.

Blackout

Soundtrack album by Vishal Mishra
- Released: 15 June 2024
- Recorded: 2023–2024
- Genre: Feature film soundtrack
- Length: 9:28
- Language: Hindi
- Label: Panorama Music

Track listing
| No. | Title | Singer(s) | Length |
|---|---|---|---|
| 1. | "Chitralekha" | Vishal Mishra | 2:52 |
| 2. | "Kya Hua" | Vishal Mishra | 4:35 |
| 3. | "Chor" | Vishal Mishra, Suraj Jagan | 3:21 |
| Total length: | | | 09:28 |

== Release ==
The film was released on 7 June 2024 on OTT platform JioCinema.

== Reception ==
Reviewing for NDTV, Saibal Chatterjee rated the film 1 star and opined, "The film is so ham-fisted that it takes no more than ten minutes to give itself away."

Shubhra Gupta of The Indian Express rated 0.5 stars and wrote "It makes you wonder if anyone involved in this enterprise knows anything from anything: a premise also needs execution."

Sukanya Verma of Rediff.com rated the film 2 stars and opined "That Blackout isn't done with its introductions until interval point tells how chaotic the storytelling is. Truly though it's the lack of wit and bonhomie that puts a spoke in its wheel."

Mahpara Kabir of ABP News rated 3.5 stars out of 5 and wrote "The most compelling aspect of the film is its constant unpredictability, which entertains and keeps the audience hooked until the very end."

Monika Rawal Kukreja of Hindustan Times stated "You’d overlook the poor execution if this bunch entertained, they don’t. Sadly, nothing works in the film's favour."

Sana Farzeen for India Today rated 2 stars and stated "The film only manages to tickle the funny bone towards the last 10 minutes when all loose ends are tied."

Simran Khan for Times Now rated 3 stars and wrote "The dialogues are funny enough to make you laugh, but the twists are so obvious that you're never on the edge of your seat, which is crucial for a crime thriller."

Ganesh Aaglave for Firstpost rated 3 stars and wrote "Vikrant Massey acts well as Lenny but the show stealer is Sunil Grover as Bewdya aka Asghar Bhai. Mouni and Jisshu Sengupta have done what was expected of them."

Nandini Ramnath of Scroll.in stated "The 122-minute film is set over a single night that seems like several compressed nights."
