= Geeta Agarwal Sharma =

Indian actress

- Other name: Geeta Agarwal
- Years active: 2007–present
- Notable work: CAT (2022); 12th Fail (2023)

Geeta Agarwal Sharma is an Indian actress who works in Hindi films and television.

== Career ==
Despite debuting in 2007, her first notable role was in the Punjabi series CAT as a politician involved in an illegal drug racket. She went on to play motherly roles in several films and television series including Chhapaak, A Suitable Boy, All India Rank, Laapataa Ladies, 12th Fail, Fighter, Tera Kya Hoga Lovely, Saiyaara and Ghich Pich.

== Filmography ==
Year	Title	Role	Notes
2007	Foto		
2009	Delhi-6	MLA Maitreyi Devi	
2011	Chillar Party	Panauti's mother	
2012	B.A. Pass	Bua Ji	
2013	Bhaag Milkha Bhaag	Milkha Singh's mother	Uncredited role
2013	Siddharth	Roshni	
2016	Satrangi	Kusum	
2016	Mirzya		Uncredited role
2017	Raabta	Gurmeet Kaur	
2017	Mubarakan	Kuldeep Kaur Bajwa	
2018	Raid	Reema	
2019	Falsafa: The Other Side	Aman's mother	
2019	Pati Patni Aur Woh	Hemlata Tripathi	
2020	Chhapaak	Malti's mother	
2020	Zindagi inShort	Amreen's mother	Segment: Chhaju Ke Dahi Bhalle
2022	Aisa Q	CM's mother	
2022	Shabaash Mithu	WCB Chief Shanta	
2023	All India Rank	Manju Singh	
2023	OMG 2	Indumati Kanti Sharan Mudgal	
2023	Laapataa Ladies	Yashoda	
2023	Fukrey 3	Prakash Kaur	
2023	12th Fail	Pushpa Sharma	Nominated–IIFA Award for Best Supporting Actress; Nominated–FOI Online Award for Best Actress in a Supporting Role
2024	Fighter	Usha	
2024	Tera Kya Hoga Lovely	Renu Kumari	
2025	Pinch	Shobha	
2025	Saiyaara	Mrs. Batra	
2025	Ghich Pich	Ritu Arora	
2025	Ek Chatur Naar	Urmila	
2025	Thamma	Sudha Goyal	
2026	Satluj	Geeta Basra	ZEE5 film
2026	Ohh My Dog	Appu's mother	

=== Television ===
Year	Title	Role	Network	Notes
2013–2014	Kaisa Yeh Ishq Hai... Ajab Sa Risk Hai		Life OK	Uncredited role
2016–2017	Kaala Teeka	Leelavati Chaudhary	ZEE TV	
2020	A Suitable Boy	Mrs. Mahesh Kapoor	BBC One	
2020	Flesh		Eros Now	
2020–2021	Kyun Rishton Mein Katti Batti	Chandrani Chaddha	ZEE TV	
2022	CAT	Madam Aulakh	Netflix	
2023	The Freelancer	Asar Fazal	Disney+ Hotstar	
2026	Daldal	Indu Mhatre	Prime Video	
