= Thennal Abhilash =

Indian actress

- Born: 30 July 2014 (age 12); Thalassery, Kerala, India
- Occupation: Actor
- Years active: 2020–present
- Awards: Best Child Actress for Sesham Mike-il Fathima

Thennal Abhilash (born 30 July 2014) is an Indian child actress who appears in the Malayalam Cinema. She is best known for portraying Kunju Fathima in Sesham Mike-il Fathima (2023), Malavika Das in Forensic (2020), Appumol in Minnal Murali (2021), Rukku in Lalitham Sundaram (2022), Balan Daughter in Voice of Sathyanathan (2023), Anya in Rudhran (2023), Vannamayil in Story of Things (2023), Keshav Daughter in Manorathangal (2024).

== Career ==
Thennal started acting with the role of childhood of Malavika Das in the movie Forensic (2020 film) in 2020. Her role as Kunju Fathima in Sesham Mike-il Fathima in 2023 was critically acclaimed and she has also got Best Child actress award in 54th Kerala State Film Awards. Kutti Thennal and Vasisht Umesh are two emerging dancers whose performances went viral on social media platforms.

== Filmography ==
- All films are in Malayalam language unless otherwise noted

Key
†	Denotes films that have not yet been released

List of film credits
Year	Title	Role	Notes	Ref.
2020	Forensic	Malavika Das	Debut film	
2021	Minnal Murali	Appumol		
2022	Lalitham Sundaram	Rukku		
2023	Voice of Sathyanathan	Balan Daughter		
2023	Sesham Mike-il Fathima	Kunju Fathima		
2023	Rudhran	Anya	Tamil film	
2023	Story of Things	Vannamayil	Tamil series	
2024	Manorathangal	Keshav's Daughter		
2025	Nancy Rani	Young Nancy		

== Awards ==
- 54th Kerala State Film Awards for Best Child Actress.
