= Dharam Veer (TV series) =

Indian period drama

- Genre: Period drama
- Written by: Varun Gautam, Meenakshi Sagar, Kalpesh Modi
- Directed by: Dharmesh Shah, Nikhil Sinha, Mukesh Kumar Singh, Inayat Shaikh
- Starring: See below
- Opening theme: Dharam Veer
- Country of origin: India
- Original language: Hindi
- No. of episodes: 195

Production
- Executive producer: Upasna Mann
- Producer: Moti Sagar Meenakshi Sagar Amrit Sagar Akash Sagar
- Production locations: Baroda, Gujarat
- Editor: Mohd. Shums
- Camera setup: Shahbaaz Khan
- Running time: 22 minutes

Original release
- Network: NDTV Imagine
- Release: 21 January – 30 October 2008

Dharam Veer (transl. Religious Warrior) is an Indian period television drama about a fictional tale of two princes, named Dharam and Veer, and their adventures as they traverse the path of life. It is presented by Sagar Pictures.

== Plot ==
The story begins by introducing the 13th-century kingdom of Aryanagar, where people are divided into the royalty (the Aryavarts) and the slaves (the Shramiks). While the Aryavarts are in charge of managing the affairs of the state and caring for the needs of the slaves, the Shramiks fulfill their duties by devoting their lives toward the welfare of the kingdom. King Aryavardhan believes that the system works for all. However, there is dissent and frustration amongst the slaves due to the humiliation and brutality they have to face at the hands Aryavardhan's older brother, Jaivardhan. A young slave named Soma dares to voice his dissent, and Aryavardhan gives Soma freedom by banishing him from the kingdom, but Jaivardhan makes a mockery of this decision by killing Soma.

Soma's son is born, believed by the slaves to be the messiah who will save them from the Aryavarts' tyranny. Jaivardhan sets the slave residences ablaze, killing all newborn children to ensure that their messiah does not survive. However, Soma's widow puts her son in a basket and throws it into the river; it is later discovered by Aryavardhan and Jaivardhan's widowed sister, Nivriti, who decides to adopt the foundling, telling everyone that the child is her son. He is named Veer, and grows up alongside the king's heir, Dharam. However, Jaivardhan aspires to make his son, Agni, the next king, and enlists a female dacoit (bandit) named Shera to kill Dharam. Shera follows the two rajkumars (non-ruling princes) to a mela (a gathering or fair) but miserably fails to kill Dharam. Dharam meets and falls in love with a princess named Sia, while Veer meets Shera who is pretending to be a princess named Ananya. When they return from the mela, Aryavardhan sends Dharam, Veer and Agni to Gurukula (residential school) to train themselves to become rajkumar.

At the gurukula, Dharam and Veer become competitors and a sense of rivalry turns their relationship bitter. Later, they reconcile and become inseparable. Toward the end of the training, Veer again meets Shera and this time they fall in love. Although Shera changes due to Veer's love, Veer condemns Shera when he learns her true identity and mission to kill Dharam. The cousins return to Aryanagar where Dharam announces that Veer deserves to be king, and Aryavardhan announces Veer's coronation ceremony. This angers the head of the Shramiks, Bhimsen, and Veer's birth mother and sister, Pari and Sakshi – who were all awaiting their messiah.

Veer discovers that he is not an Aryavrath. On the day of his coronation, he enters the palace as the messiah of the Shramiks, to everyone's surprise. The Rajya Sabha (parliament) jails Veer. Dharam is crowned instead, and asks Veer to return to the palace, but Veer asks for the Shramik's freedom and leaves to stay with his birth mother and sister.

Dharam and Veer become enemies. Dharam meets Sia again, and Veer meets and forgives Shera. Dharam and Veer are tricked by Jaivardhan and Agni, and decide to kill each other, but at the end of the drama the treachery is revealed and they reunite to kill the would-be usurpers. Veer returns to the palace to stay with Dharam and they are both crowned kings of Aryanagar, and Dharam announces the emancipation of the Shramiks.

== Cast and characters ==
- Dharam (played by Vikrant Massey) was brought up to believe in righteousness, follow his dharma as a prince and fulfill his responsibilities and duties towards the kingdom and its people. He is a year older than Veer, who is his best friend and (secretly adopted) cousin. Dharam loves and has complete faith in Veer and he is the one who usually uses his mind and his knowledge of the Aryanagar parampara over his feelings when faced with a situation. He has also developed some feelings for the princess of Awadhi, Rajkumari Sia.
- Veer (played by Rajat Tokas) is Dharam's (secretly adopted) cousin and best friend, and he loves Dharam and believes it is his duty to protect him no matter what. He is instinctive and spontaneous, blessed with a natural wit and intelligence which he uses to help Dharam fulfill his princely duties and responsibilities.
- Shera (played by Mugdha Chaphekar) is a thug, a strong lady who does whatever her father tells her to do, robbing people and accumulating treasure. She had been paid a ransom to kill Dharam, and feigns to be a princess named Ananya. Shera changes herself for her love of Veer, but her identity is revealed which leads to their breakup. She helps Veer in all possible ways, and finally reunites with Veer and helps Veer and Dharam succeed their throne.
- Sia (played by Geetu Bawa and Priyanka Mishra) is the princess of Avadhi. She has a sharp tongue and throws frequent tantrums, wanting everything to go her way. Her few encounters with Dharam leave her angry but she later falls for him, encouraged by a fortune-teller (who was actually Veer in disguise). When she speaks low of Shramiks in Aryanagar, Dharam indignantly tells her to leave his kingdom. Later she realizes her mistake and loves Dharam but receives no response from him.
