= Pinkvilla =

Indian online entertainment website

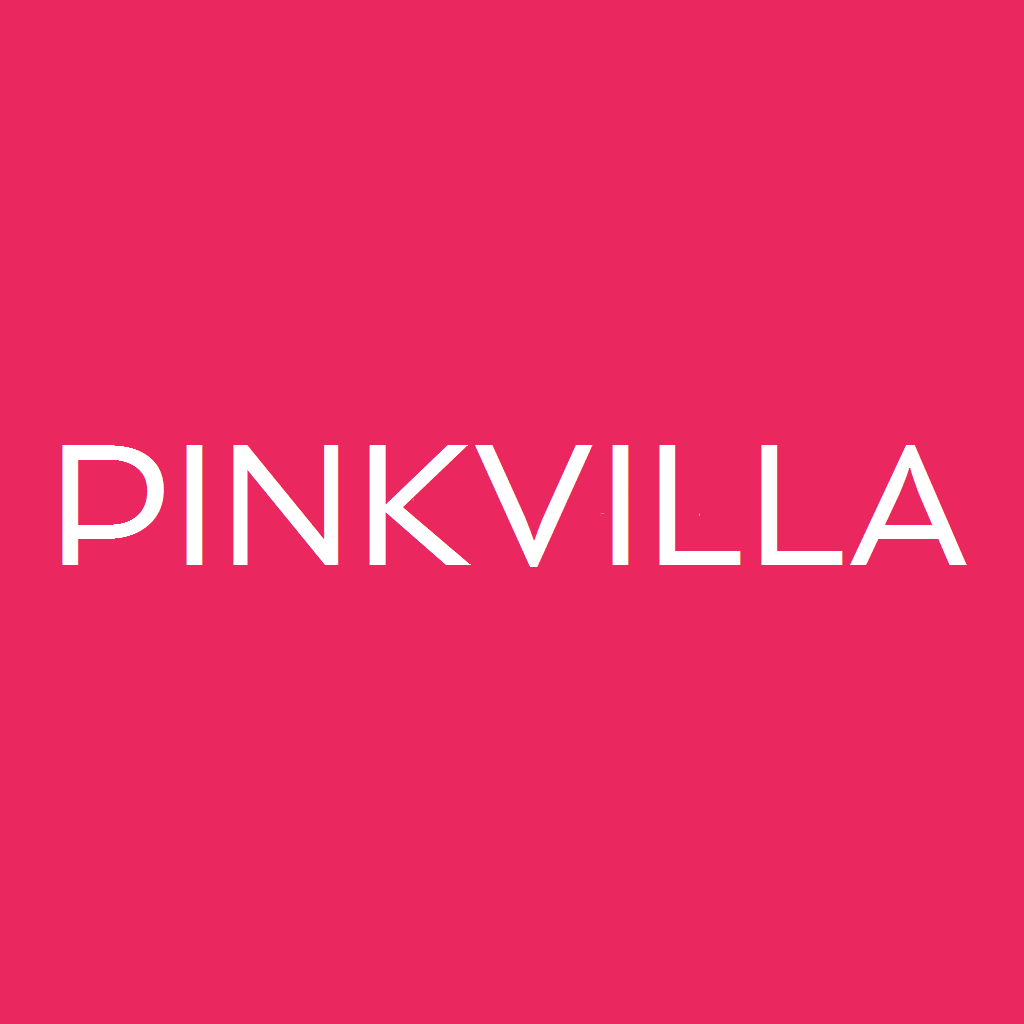
- Official logo of Pinkvilla
- Website type: Entertainment news site
- Available in: English; Hindi
- Founded: 2007
- Headquarters: Mumbai, Maharashtra
- Country of origin: India
- Area served: Worldwide
- Founder: Nandini Shenoy
- CEO: Nandini Shenoy
- Industry: Entertainment; Lifestyle; Arts
- Website: www.pinkvilla.com
- Commercial: Yes
- Launched: May 2007; 19 years ago.
- Current status: Active

Pinkvilla is an Indian entertainment and lifestyle platform. As of June 2022, Pinkvilla has over 50,000,000 visitors on its website and app.

== Overview ==
Pinkvilla covers entertainment and lifestyle stories. Its coverage extends to Bollywood, Hollywood, South Cinema, and Korean entertainment as well as fashion, food, travel, health, and many others. Comscore revealed that Pinkvilla was the top entertainment portal in India for March 2019.

== History ==
Launched in May 2007, Pinkvilla was founded by Nandini Shenoy, who formerly worked at Microsoft as a software engineer.

The site initially operated solely from the US with no connections to Indian media. Nandini formed a network of photographers to work with Pinkvilla, allowing the platform to gain readers in 2009 when some photos of Sonam Kapoor went viral. In 2013, Pinkvilla formed its first editorial team in Mumbai, setting up its first office in 2015.

In 2020, the platform recorded more than 30 million unique monthly visitors. In the same year, it also announced the launch of its two new Pinkvilla properties, "HallyuTalk" and "Pinkvilla Rooms". HallyuTalk is the first Korean entertainment platform launched extensively in the country. In 2021, international box office analyst Jatinder Singh joined the Pinkvilla editorial team.

=== Sub-verticals ===
- Pinkvilla South
- Pinkvilla Telly
- Pinkvilla Fashion
- Pinkvilla USA
- Pinkvilla Rooms
- HindiRush
- Pinkvilla Telugu
- HallyuTalk

== Events ==
Pinkvilla has organized several events. In 2018, the platform collaborated with Lux on the Lux Golden Rose Awards.

In 2022, Pinkvilla launched two independent initiatives through its Korean entertainment vertical, HallyuTalk: the Pinkvilla Style Icons and the HallyuTalk Awards.

The first edition of the Pinkvilla Style Icons Awards was held on 16 June 2022 in Mumbai, marking 15 years since the brand's establishment.

=== HallyuTalk Awards ===
The HallyuTalk Awards is an annual awards show organized by Pinkvilla's Korean entertainment vertical, HallyuTalk. Launched in 2022, it was India's first digital awards ceremony dedicated to Korean entertainment, including K-drama, K-pop, and Hallyu culture. The awards initiative has received industry recognition, including a Gold award at the India Content Leadership Awards 2022 and an ET Brand Equity Shark Award.

The inaugural edition was held virtually on 14 January 2022 from Mumbai. Winners were selected through public online voting across 13 categories. The digital event recorded over 11 million social media engagements and reached over 275 million users globally during its first edition. The initiative received coverage from the Korean Cultural Centre India (KCCI), with its director describing the event as "meaningful and historical".

The second edition (HallyuTalk Awards 2.0) was held in 2023 with 15 categories. Winners included Cha Eun-woo (Star of the Year), Park Eun-bin (Best Actress), V (Fashionista of the Year), and Suga's collaboration with PSY, "That That", which won Most Katchy Song of the Year.

== See also ==
- Indian Cinema
