= Forensic (2022 film) =

2022 Indian film by Vishal Furia

- Directed by: Vishal Furia
- Screenplay by: Ajit Jagtap; Vishal Kapoor; Adhir Bhat
- Story by: Mansi Bagla
- Based on: Forensic by Akhil Paul-Anas Khan
- Produced by: Deepak Mukut; Mansi Bagla; Varun Bagla
- Starring: Vikrant Massey; Radhika Apte; Rohit Roy; Prachi Desai
- Cinematography: Anshul Chobey
- Edited by: Abhijit Deshpande
- Music by: Amol Shrivastava; Abhishek Talented
- Production companies: Mini Films; Soham Rockstar Entertainment
- Distributed by: ZEE5
- Release date: 24 June 2022
- Running time: 134 minutes
- Country: India
- Language: Hindi

Forensic: The Truth Lies Within, also known as Forensic, is a 2022 Indian Hindi-language psychological crime thriller film directed by Vishal Furia. It is a remake of the 2020 Malayalam film of the same name. The film stars Vikrant Massey, Radhika Apte, Prachi Desai, Rohit Roy and Harbanddana Kaur. The story, set in Mussoorie, follows a police officer and forensic specialist who are on the trail together to find a serial killer. It was released on ZEE5 on 24 June 2022.

== Plot ==
A young boy is beaten by his father for watching his sister celebrate her birthday. Later that night, he sneaks into his sister's bedroom holding a knife.

In Dehradun, Johnny Khanna, a forensic specialist, is called to a crime scene where a wife has been murdered and the husband is in cardiac distress. He finds evidence that proves the husband killed his wife.

In a school, a girl walks into a church and sees a group of children singing a birthday song to a girl named Jennifer. The birthday girl offers the school girl a sweet. The next morning, SI Megha Sharma is called to a crime scene, where girl's body has been discovered. Following a post-mortem, the victim is revealed to be the birthday girl.

Megha is assigned to the case, and assisting her is her ex-boyfriend Johnny. Johnny's elder brother Abhay was married to Megha's elder sister Divya, and the couple had twins, Aanya and Aadhya. After the deaths of Aadhya and Divya, Abhay loses custody of Aanya who is taken away by Megha. She reviews CCTV footage and sees Jennifer being lured to a mysterious person before getting kidnapped. Megha deduces that Jennifer might of known her killer. Johnny uses evidence and locates where Jennifer hit her head. Johnny concludes that the killer is left-handed because of the angles of her stab wounds. He also deduces that the killer is a child who is around the same height as Jennifer. Megha believes that the killer may be an adult with dwarfism and arrests a performer named Charlie. However, he is released due to his footprint not matching with the killer's.

Aditi, the daughter of an MLA is kidnapped at her birthday party, and after finding a blood sample, Johnny believes that the killer is a male between the ages of 10 and 12 because of his footprint. Megha gets a statement from a man who saw the killer murdering one of his victims. After distributing a sketch of the killer, Megha gets a call from a mental asylum in Rishikesh, in which a young boy named Rohan, was brought to the asylum after killing his parents 3 years ago. He escaped from the asylum 3 months ago and is assumed to now be 11. Megha appeals to the people of Mussoorie to inform the police if they see him anywhere.

Aanya has been undergoing counselling by psychologist, Dr. Ranjana, to overcome the trauma of losing her mother and twin sister. Megha receives call from Ranjana that Aanya has gone missing, and upon reaching Ranjana's house, she finds her playing with Rohan. After taking away Rohan, she discovers Aditi's body from a terrace. The case is solved and Rohan is convicted as the killer. However, Johhny believes that Rohan did not commit the murders, as Rohan is right-handed, and the killer is left-handed. Another girl, Bindiya Pandit goes missing and Aanya is shown pushing a cart with Aditi's dead body. In a flashback 5 years ago, Aadhya went missing at a fair and her dead body is discovered by Aanya. Out of grief, Divya committed suicide and Abhay is blamed for their deaths.

Megha asks Ranjana to extract information from Rohan and he confesses to hearing a young girl's voice inside his head to commit the murders. A news report then shows footage of Aanya pushing a cart with Bindiya's dead body, framing her as the killer. Megha is taken off the case and is suspended until further notice; she is also placed on house-arrest until Aanya is located. After receiving a tip from an unknown caller, Bindiya's body is found. Johnny sneaks into Megha's home, and helps her prove Aanya's innocence. He admits to finding Bindiya's body and comes to the conclusion is in fact an adult, who has been manipulating Rohan and Aanya to commit the murders. Johnny had discovered a derelict house containing Bindiya's DNA, and believes that killer will only kill her after 3 days, which will be her birthday. Through some drawings that Aanya made, Johnny and Megha go to the supposed location where they find Abhay with Aanya. Aanya has been seeing Abhay for more than a year, unbeknownst to Megha. After seeing Aanya on the news, Abhay brings her to his villa, afraid that the killer might be after her. Fearing for her safety, Megha lets Aanya stay with Abhay.

Megha's theory is proven to be correct, when similar cases of girls reported missing occurred in Rishikesh, 5 years earlier. Johnny's mentor, Dr. Solanki suggests that they should do DNA phenotyping, to find out the age and appearance of the killer. They learn that the Rishikesh victims had a common psychiatrist, Dr. Ramesh Gupta. A neighbor informs them that Gupta had been diagnosed with cancer, and that his adopted son Shashi, committed suicide. Since the other victims were discovered on train tracks, Megha deduces that Gupta was recreating his son's death using the victims. Upon recalling Gupta's appearance, she learns that Gupta is none other than Ranjana's mentor. Believing that Ranjana and Aanya's lives are in danger, she and Johnny rush to Mussoorie.

Abhay finds Aanya having a seizure, and calls Ranjana. Megha and Johnny arrive at Ranjana's home, and finds Gupta who reveals that he had adopted Shashi from a juvenile home when he was a child. As he grew elder, he wanted to be a child psychiatrist like his father, but after hearing about his father's cancer diagnoses, he goes on a killing spree. Megha and Johnny are also informed that the phenotype shows the DNA of Shashi. Moreover, they discover that Shashi faked his death and is disguised as Ranjana. Once Shashi arrives at Abhay's villa, she stabs him and hypnotises Aanya, like she did with Rohan.

Johnny receives a call from Abhay who tells him that Aanya has been kidnapped by Shashi. Johnny and Megha are able to locate Aanya, who has been held hostage by Shashi. A fight ensues between Megha and Shashi, and Johnny frees Aanya. As Shashi is about to win against Megha, Johnny shoots her. In the end, Aanya visits her father in hospital along with Johnny and Megha, who are shown to be together again. Megha and Johnny both receive calls to investigate a series of murders in Goa, excited to work with each other again.

== Cast ==
- Vikrant Massey as Johnny Khanna, A forensic surgeon and Abhay's younger brother
- Radhika Apte as SI Megha Sharma, Divya's younger sister
- Prachi Desai as Dr. Ranjana / Shashi Ramesh Gupta, a therapist
- Rohit Roy as Abhay Khanna, Johnny's elder brother and Divya's husband
- Anant Mahadevan as Dr. Ramesh Gupta
- Narendra Gupta as Dr. Solanki, Johnny's mentor
- Harbandana Kaur as Aanya Khanna, Abhay and Divya's daughter
- Vindu Dara Singh as Constable Rawat
- Subrat Dutta as Inspector Ved Prakash Mathur
- Zeba Sherriff as Divya, Aanya's mother and Megha's elder sister
