= Amit Rai =

Indian film director and writer

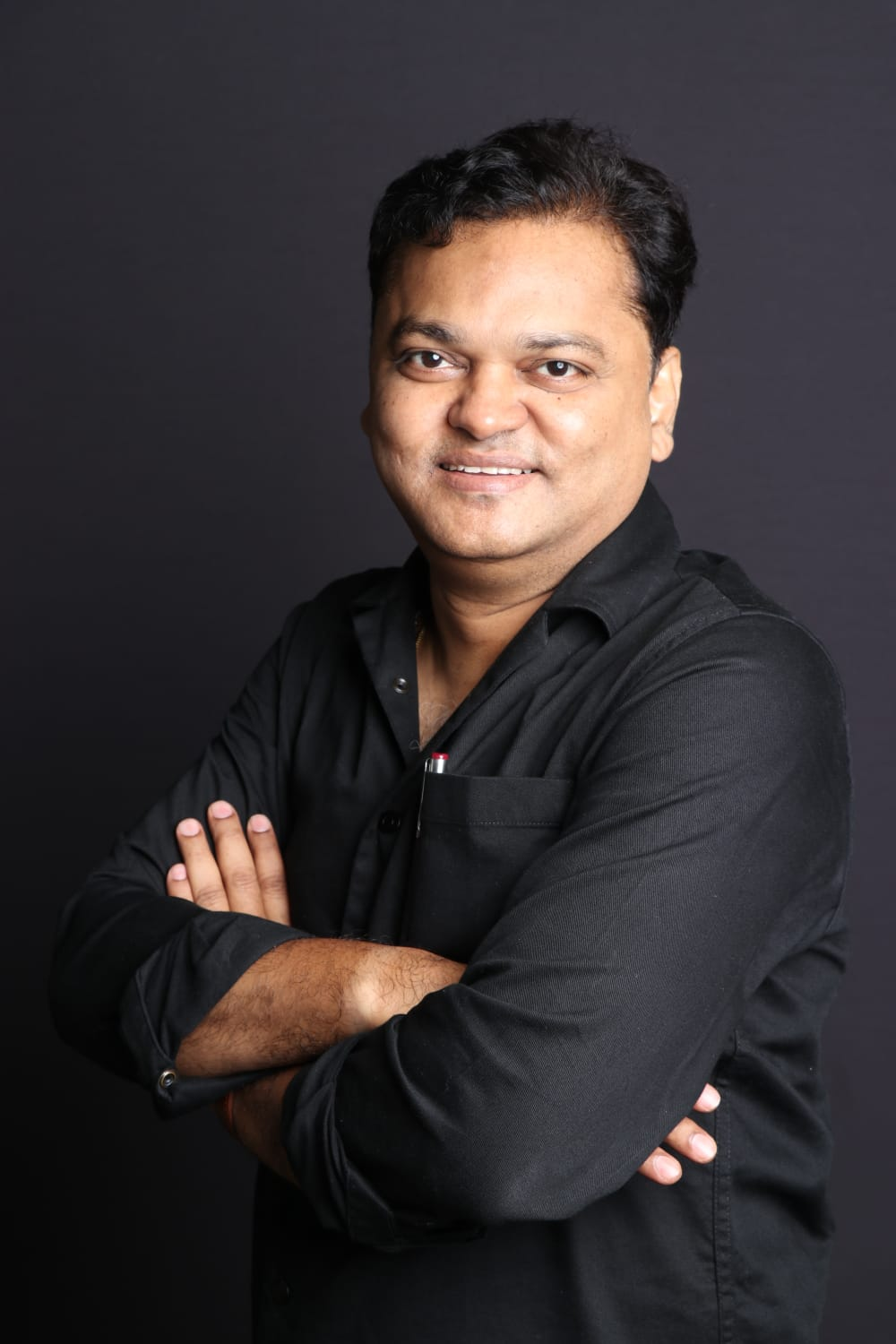

Amit Rai is an Indian film director and writer. He won the Gollapudi Srinivas Award in 2010 for directing Road to Sangam. As an associate director he did 2009 Marathi film Tingya, which was critically acclaimed and won various National and International awards.

After a long break from the industry, he wrote and directed the sequel to OMG – Oh My God! titled OMG 2 in 2023 which gained high critical and audience acclaim and became a box office success. He has received 69th Filmfare Awards for the film OMG 2 (best story) in 2024.

== Filmography ==
Year	Film	Language	Credited as
2008	Tingya	Marathi	Associate Director
2010	Road to Sangam	Hindi	Director
2023	OMG 2	Hindi	Writer & Director
2023	Dear Jassi	Punjabi; English	Writer
2026	Ohh My Dog	Hindi	Director, writer

== Awards ==
- Gollapudi Srinivas Award (2010)
