= 12th Fail =

2023 Indian film by Vidhu Vinod Chopra

- Theatrical release poster
- Directed by: Vidhu Vinod Chopra
- Written by: Vidhu Vinod Chopra; Jaskunwar Kohli
- Based on: 12th Fail by Anurag Pathak
- Produced by: Vidhu Vinod Chopra; Yogesh Ishwar
- Starring: Vikrant Massey; Medha Shankr; Anant Joshi; Anshumaan Pushkar; Priyanshu Chatterjee
- Narrated by: Anant Joshi
- Cinematography: Rangarajan Ramabadran
- Edited by: Jaskunwar Kohli; Vidhu Vinod Chopra
- Music by: Shantanu Moitra
- Production company: Vinod Chopra Films
- Distributed by: Zee Studios
- Release date: 27 October 2023
- Running time: 146 minutes
- Country: India
- Language: Hindi
- Budget: ₹20 crore
- Box office: est. ₹69.64 crore

12th Fail is a 2023 Indian Hindi-language biographical drama film directed, produced and written by Vidhu Vinod Chopra, and jointly written and edited by Chopra and Jaskunwar Kohli. It is based on the 2019 eponymous non-fiction book by Anurag Pathak about Manoj Kumar Sharma, who overcame extreme poverty to become an Indian Police Service officer, and Shraddha Joshi, who became an Indian Revenue Service officer and married Sharma. The film stars Vikrant Massey as Sharma and Medha Shankr as Joshi, alongside Anant Joshi, Anshumaan Pushkar and Priyanshu Chatterjee.

Released theatrically on 27 October 2023, 12th Fail received widespread critical acclaim and emerged as a sleeper hit, grossing over ₹69 crore (US$7.4 million) worldwide on a ₹20 crore (US$2.1 million) budget. At the 69th Filmfare Awards, it won five awards, including Best Film, Best Director and Best Actor (Critics) (Massey). At the 71st National Film Awards, the film won 2 awards: Best Feature Film and Best Actor in a Leading Role (Massey).

== Plot ==
Manoj Kumar Sharma, the son of a low-ranking clerk, grows up in a corrupt, dacoit-infested village in the Chambal region. His father, a man of rigid principles, is suspended from his job after hitting a corrupt superior officer. To survive academically, Manoj and his classmates rely heavily on school-sanctioned cheating to pass their exams. However, during Manoj's critical Class 12 examinations, a newly transferred Deputy Superintendent of Police, Dushyant Singh, strictly enforces anti-cheating protocols, resulting in the entire student body failing.

With his father traveling away to contest his suspension in court, Manoj and his brother operate an improvised rickshaw service to sustain the family. When his brother inadvertently offends the henchmen of a local politician, he is arrested on fabricated alcohol-smuggling charges. The local police attempt to frame his brother, but Manoj manages to secure his release by appealing to DSP Dushyant. Inspired by the officer's integrity, Manoj asks how he can emulate his career path. Dushyant advises him to simply "stop cheating." A year later, Manoj clears his examinations honestly and decides to pursue a Bachelor of Arts degree to qualify for the civil services. Armed with his grandmother's life savings, he travels to Gwalior, but his belongings are stolen en route, and he arrives to discover that the state civil service exams have been suspended for the next three years.

Stranded and destitute, Manoj is assisted by a sympathetic local hotelier and Pritam Pandey, a wealthy aspirant whose father encourages him to move to Delhi to prepare for the hyper-competitive Union Public Service Commission (UPSC) exams instead. Learning of the prestigious Indian Police Service (IPS) cadre, Manoj joins Pritam on his journey to the coaching hub of Mukherjee Nagar, Delhi. There, they meet Gauri Bhaiya, a veteran aspirant on his final attempt, who provides Manoj with a menial job and a place to study. When Gauri fails his final attempt, he establishes a tea stall named "Restart" to mentor and support other underprivileged candidates.

Manoj fails the preliminary examination on his first attempt. Under Gauri's guidance, he intensifies his preparation and clears the preliminaries the following year. At a coaching institute, he meets and falls in love with Shraddha Joshi, an aspirant preparing for UKPSC exams. Due to a misunderstanding involving a textbook he is holding, Shraddha mistakenly believes Manoj is an aeronautical engineering student, a misconception Manoj hesitates to correct. That year, Manoj fails his main examinations due to a structural error in his essay. Concurrently, his relationship with Shraddha strains when she discovers he is actually a literature graduate. Seeking closure, Manoj travels to her training institute in Mussoorie to apologize and confess his feelings, but she tells him to focus entirely on returning to Delhi to study.

Manoj visits his village only to discover that his grandmother has passed away. Returning to Delhi with renewed determination, he takes a grueling job at a flour mill to fund his studies and send money back home. Shraddha eventually relocates to Delhi for her studies, apologizes to Manoj for her past coldness, and reciprocates his love after he successfully clears his next preliminary round.

Recognizing Manoj's academic potential, Gauri moves him into his own residence to eliminate distractions, allowing Manoj to successfully clear the main written examinations. Meanwhile, Shraddha passes her state-level civil service exams. Tensions arise when an envious Pritam, who failed his own examinations, falsely tells Shraddha's family that she is cohabiting with Manoj. Manoj confronts Pritam, only to realize that Pritam was forced into civil service preparation by an overbearing father despite wanting to be a journalist. Manoj urges Pritam to assert his independence.

During the final UPSC interview panel, Manoj faces intense scrutiny and openly confesses to failing his 12th-grade exams due to the sudden crackdown on cheating. While the panel chairman remains skeptical, the rest of the board is deeply impressed by his unyielding honesty, resilience, and core ideals. Two months later, the final results are announced, confirming Manoj's selection as an IPS officer. One year later, Manoj, now a functional police officer, marries Shraddha and visits a police station in Mandsaur to formally thank a surprised DSP Dushyant Singh for changing the trajectory of his life. Pritam also finds fulfillment, establishing himself as a successful television news reporter.

== Cast ==
- Vikrant Massey as IPS Manoj Kumar Sharma
- Medha Shankr as PCS Shraddha Joshi Sharma
- Anant V Joshi as Pritam Pandey; the character is loosely based on Anurag Pathak, who authored the eponymous book
- Anshumaan Pushkar as Gauri Bhaiya
- Priyanshu Chatterjee as Dushyant Singh, DSP
- Geeta Agarwal Sharma as Pushpa Sharma, Manoj's mother
- Harish Khanna as Ramveer Sharma, Manoj's father
- Sarita Joshi as Manoj's grandmother
- Darius Chinoy as Mr. Solanki
- Abhishek Sengupta as Tutul
- Sanjay Bishnoi as Naval
- Deepak Arora as Dr.Yadav
- Salim Siddiqui as Dilip Tomar, Police Officer
- Vikas Divyakirti as himself
- Vijay Kumar Dogra as Sundar
- Perry Chhabra as Rajini Sharma, Manoj's younger sister
- Sam Mohan as Deep Mohan, IAS
- Neeraj Kalra as Professor Prabhakar Joshi, Shraddha's father
- Radhika Joshi as Tanya
- Fasi Khan as Kishan, Shraddha's house servant
- Rahul Dev Shetty as Mr. Mehta, Manoj's UPSC interviewer
- Gurleen Arora as Zai Arora, the Institute owners daughter

== Production ==
=== Development ===
In November 2022, filmmaker Vidhu Vinod Chopra announced the film, based on the novel Twelfth Fail, by Anurag Pathak. The film is inspired by the real life story of IPS Officer Manoj Kumar Sharma and IRS Officer Shraddha Joshi.

=== Casting ===
In November 2022, Chopra announced that actor Vikrant Massey will play the lead, marking their first collaboration. UPSC coach Vikas Divyakirti was cast to play himself on screen. Many real life UPSC aspirants were cast in various roles. According to Massey, it added "authenticity" to the film. Sharma and Joshi both made a cameo appearance in the film.

=== Filming ===
The film is shot mainly at various locations in Agra, Chambal, Delhi, Mussoorie and Mumbai. A major portion of the film was shot in the two education hubs for government job aspirants, Rajendra Nagar and Mukherjee Nagar. The filming was wrapped up in December 2022.

== Release ==
=== Theatrical ===
12th Fail's teaser was released on 10 August 2023, while its trailer was released on 3 October 2023. The film was released in theatres on 27 October 2023 in Hindi and Kannada languages. After the success in Hindi, the makers announced that the film will be dubbed in Tamil and Telugu languages and was released on 3 November 2023.

=== Home media ===
The film started streaming on Disney+ Hotstar from 29 December 2023.

== Soundtrack ==
The music of the film is composed by Shantanu Moitra while lyrics are written by Swanand Kirkire and Raftaar. The film's background score by Moitra, with its use of sitar and flute, was inspired by the score by Pandit Ravi Shankar in the Bengali film Pather Panchali (1955).

== Reception ==
12th Fail received critical acclaim. Massey's performance was particularly praised. On the review aggregator website Rotten Tomatoes, 91% of 11 critics' reviews are positive, with an average rating of 6.8/10.

Saibal Chatterjee of NDTV gave 3.5 stars out of 5 and said "Its an original depiction of an Indian Police Service (IPS) officer's life, 12th Fail is a thought-provoking and amusing film. A really sympathetic story is produced by the screenplay. It avoids any kind of extravagance in order to extract every last bit of drama from the bump and tumble of the man's journey." Mayank Shekhar of Mid-Day gave 4 stars out of 5 and reviewed the film "This is the India story!". Monika Rawal Kukreja of Hindustan Times stated in her reviews that 12th Fail is a must-watch to understand not only the hardships and emotions that UPSC students go through, but it also sheds light on the overall education in our system, something that Chopra won hearts at with 3 Idiots (2009).

Shubhra Gupta of The Indian Express gave 3 stars out of 5 and wrote that "[d]espite the background music and the occasional mood spikes, 12th Fail stays, for the most part, a film that cleaves close to ground reality. With characters that make you feel that they've wandered off the street." She adds, "[i]t's not just the main cast, but the numbers of the young who gather in the hot-spots rife with coaching centres, such as North Delhi’s Mukherjee Nagar: all these multitudes, crowding into tiny rooms, far away from their homes, cramming day and night to get through the exams in the hope of becoming something more than who they are, is such an India story." Deepa Gahlot of Rediff.com praised the performance of Vikrant Massey and said "If Vikrant Massey does not win a National Award for this film, it will be unjust to an actor who has given a performance of such unalloyed brilliance." Dhaval Roy of The Times of India gave 4 stars out of 5 and stated in his review that 12th Fail is an excellent film that is highly recommended, with nearly every scene over its 147 minutes leaving you feeling inspired and amazed. Bravo to Chopra for making sure each character in the film is given their best chance. Bhavna Agarwal of India Today gave 4 stars out of 5 and wrote "Vikrant Massey passes with flying colours on performance sheet".

Anuj Kumar of The Hindu reviewed movie and wrote "12th Fail film review: Vidhu Vinod Chopra delivers yet another hug of hope that is more earnest than magical." Sneha Bengani of CNBC TV18 reviewed the film, writing "Vikrant Massey powers through this remarkable story of perseverance". Gunjan D. Bidani of Zee News gave 4 stars out of 5, writing "Not to be hyperbolic, but 12th Fail might be just perfect. To watch 12th Fail properly requires fortitude. Goes without saying that the film at its root is a deep deprivation of human fundamentals. The arc of Vidhu Vinod Chopra-directorial is a daily barrage of study load, tricky social dynamics, menial jobs for sustenance and raw spillage of emotions." Sajesh Mohan of Onmanorama in his review wrote "The soundscape, meticulously crafted by Manav Shrotriya, amplifies the aches and joys of Manoj's journey. The way Manav uses and reuses background noise fading in and out to isolate Manoj and his emotions even in crowded scenes adds a meditative focus."

At Critics Choice Award, which was held on 12 March 2024, 12th Fail won the "Best Feature Film Award" and Vikrant Massey was awarded the Best Actor award.

== Accolades ==
Award	Ceremony date	Category	Recipients	Result	Ref.
Filmfare Awards	28 January 2024	Best Film	Vinod Chopra Films, Zee Studios	Won	
Filmfare Awards	28 January 2024	Best Film (Critics)	Vidhu Vinod Chopra	Nominated	
Filmfare Awards	28 January 2024	Best Director	Vidhu Vinod Chopra	Won	
Filmfare Awards	28 January 2024	Best Screenplay	Vidhu Vinod Chopra	Won	
Filmfare Awards	28 January 2024	Best Dialogue	Vidhu Vinod Chopra	Nominated	
Filmfare Awards	28 January 2024	Best Actor (Critics)	Vikrant Massey	Won	
Filmfare Awards	28 January 2024	Best Editing	Jaskunwar Kohli, Vidhu Vinod Chopra	Won	
Filmfare Awards	28 January 2024	Best Production Design	Prashant Bidkar	Nominated	
Filmfare Awards	28 January 2024	Best Cinematography	Rangarajan Ramabadran	Nominated	
Filmfare Awards	28 January 2024	Best Sound Design	Manav Shrotriya	Nominated	
Filmfare Awards	28 January 2024	Best Background Score	Shantanu Moitra	Nominated	
Filmfare Awards	28 January 2024	Best Costume Design	Malvika Bajaj	Nominated	
International Indian Film Academy Awards	28 September 2024	Best Film	12th Fail	Nominated	
International Indian Film Academy Awards	28 September 2024	Best Director	Vidhu Vinod Chopra	Won	
International Indian Film Academy Awards	28 September 2024	Best Actor	Vikrant Massey	Nominated	
International Indian Film Academy Awards	28 September 2024	Best Supporting Actress	Geeta Agarwal Sharma	Nominated	
International Indian Film Academy Awards	28 September 2024	Best Music Director	Shantanu Moitra	Nominated	
International Indian Film Academy Awards	28 September 2024	Best Story (Adapted)	Vidhu Vinod Chopra, Jaskunwar Kohli	Won	
International Indian Film Academy Awards	28 September 2024	Best Screenplay	Vidhu Vinod Chopra, Jaskunwar Kohli, Anurag Pathak, Aayush Saxena, Vikas Divyakirti	Won	
National Film Awards	1 August 2025	Best Feature Film	Vinod Chopra Films, Zee Studios	Won	
National Film Awards	1 August 2025	Best Actor in a Leading Role	Vikrant Massey	Won	

== Sequel ==
On 13 December 2024, Chopra released a film related to 12th Fail titled Zero se Restart ; initially reported to be a prequel, the film was later revealed to be a making-of documentary.
