= Shraddha Joshi Sharma =

Indian civil servant

Shraddha Joshi
- Born: 5 March 1979 (age 47); Almora
- Occupation: Indian Revenue Service (IRS) officer
- Years active: 2007–present
- Spouse: Manoj Kumar Sharma
- Children: 2

Shraddha Joshi Sharma is an Indian Revenue Service (IRS) officer of the 2007 batch. She is the Commissioner of Customs of the Audit Commissionerate, Zone 1 in Mumbai.

== Early education ==
She did her schooling at Almora. After school, she went on to study a Bachelor's in Ayurvedic Medicine and Surgery at Gurukula Kangri University, Haridwar. Joshi worked as a doctor in a hospital in Uttarakhand after her studies. But she changed her plan and started preparing for the UPSC exam.

== Career ==
She started her career as a Deputy Collector. After that, she worked with the Uttarakhand government. In 2018, she served as the MD of the Women Economic Development Corporation.

She currently serves as the Managing Director of the Maharashtra Tourism Development Corporation (MTDC) in Mumbai.

== Personal life ==
Shraddha Joshi was born into an academic family in Almora, Uttarakhand. She is one of two siblings and has a brother, Himanshu Joshi, who holds a senior position in the private sector. The family traces its roots to Almora in the Kumaon region of Uttarakhand. Shraddha Joshi married Indian Police Service (IPS) officer Manoj Kumar Sharma. They have two children together.

== In popular culture ==
The critically acclaimed movie 12th Fail, which is based on her husband Manoj Kumar Sharma's life, was released in 2023. 12th Fail, directed by Vidhu Vinod Chopra, features Medha Shankr as Sharaddha Joshi.
