= OMG 2 =

2023 Indian film by Amit Rai

- Theatrical release poster
- Directed by: Amit Rai
- Written by: Amit Rai
- Produced by: Aruna Bhatia; Vipul D. Shah; Rajesh Bahl; Ashwin Varde
- Starring: Akshay Kumar; Pankaj Tripathi; Yami Gautam
- Cinematography: Amalendu Chaudhary
- Edited by: Suvir Nath
- Music by: Songs: Vikram Montrose; Hansraj Raghuwanshi; Djstrings; Pranaay; Kashh; Sandesh Shandilya; Background Score: Mangesh Dhakde
- Production companies: Cape of Good Films; Viacom18 Studios; Wakaoo Films
- Distributed by: Viacom18 Studios
- Release date: 11 August 2023
- Running time: 155 minutes
- Country: India
- Language: Hindi
- Budget: est. ₹50 crore
- Box office: est. ₹221.08 crore

OMG 2 is a 2023 Indian Hindi-language comedy-drama film about sex education in India, written and directed by Amit Rai. It is a spiritual sequel to OMG – Oh My God! (2012), and stars Akshay Kumar, Pankaj Tripathi, and Yami Gautam.

The film was theatrically released on 11 August 2023 to positive reviews from critics. It grossed ₹221.08 crore (US$24 million) worldwide. At the 69th Filmfare Awards, the film received ten nominations, including Best Film, Best Director, Best Actor (Critics) (Tripathi), Best Supporting Actor (Kumar), and Best Supporting Actress (Gautam), and won the award for Best Story.

== Plot ==
Kanti Sharan Mudgal, a loyal devotee of Lord Shiva, owns a shop outside the city's prominent Mahakaal temple. One day, he is called to the hospital and told that his son Vivek has been up all night masturbating continuously until he fainted. Vivek's friend explains that Vivek was bullied about the size of his penis and due to this, he became insecure. Vivek was told that masturbating will make it bigger.

Atal Nath Maheshwari, the chairman of the school Vivek studies in, tells Kanti about a recent video showing Vivek masturbating in the school restroom. As this is affecting the school's image, Vivek is expelled from the school and branded a sexual deviant. Kanti's friend, Pandey Ji, a rich priest at the temple, advises him to leave town as the situation is tarnishing their religious image. The video reaches Kanti's wife and daughter and their entire neighbourhood. They begin to be shamed and relentlessly mocked by society. Devastated, Kanti prays to Lord Shiva for help and Lord Shiva indeed arrives in the form of a messenger.

After a police complaint against Vivek for trying to confront his bully, The One meets Vivek and Kanti at the police station, saying he's there to lodge a complaint of his missing bag, where he comforts Vivek. Vivek tries to commit suicide twice but is saved by The One. He meets Kanti as they're about to leave town, and tells him that his son did nothing wrong, explaining that not everything done in privacy is wrong or obscene, but that he went too far regardless. It is the school's fault for reinforcing the stigma around sex, and failing to provide proper sex education. He advises Kanti to file a case against the school and the medical practitioners.

Kanti files a case against the school, the chemists, the doctor, the nurse, the janitor, and himself. When opposed with the fact that he is promoting vulgarity and pornography by defending his son's act, he holds the point in court that the Indian culture was always inclusive of conversations on sex through presenting multiple publications to get his case accepted. Pandey Ji asks Kanti to leave his given house and shop as this case will tarnish their religious image.

Kamini Maheshwari, Atal's daughter-in-law and the opposition lawyer, says Kanti is doing all this to cover up his son's vulgar act. Kanti argues that if the school had included sex in their courses, his son wouldn't have been so misinformed. The One often visits to give Kanti indirect advice on how to continue the case.

Kamini calls a prostitute to court, whose son studies in the same school, to prove a point that the school is noble. Kanti asks the prostitute if she ever enjoys her work, to which she says no. Kanti says if the schools taught sex to young boys, they would know how to respect women and their hearts. He bows down to her calling her a brave mother and teacher.

As the case continues, Kanti points out issues regarding pornography, rape, pharmaceutical interventions, and the importance of protecting oneself against misinformation or abuse. Convinced by Kanti's research, the judge gives Kanti more time and eventually adjourns the hearing. Kanti then receives backlash for this, with legal actions from every part of the nation. The school chairman offers him one crore to take his case back. A distraught Kanti signs the contract, concerned by the legal actions faced. He gets into an accident and apparently dies. The One visits him in the hospital, and criticises his decision of losing faith, and finally reveals himself to be Lord Shiva. He shows Kanti that his efforts have come to light as Pandey Ji's granddaughter reveals that she had been molested by her uncle, thanks to Kanti's case being shown on TV. Kanti realises his mistake and is revived. The One teleports him to court.

At the final hearing, Vivek arrives for the first time and proves through his research that the British empire had altered India's education system, which was inclusive of sex education during that time period. Subsequently, several youngsters, including Vivek's friends, demand sex education, while Kamini is stunned and left speechless. With compelling evidence, the judge eventually sides with Kanti and he wins the case as the education board is ordered to make sex education in schools compulsory and payment be given to Kanti, and that Vivek be taken back into the school along with strict action against his bullies.

Kanti introduces the One to his family as "the doctor who treated him" and offers Him all the money instead of the temple. The One then reveals that the lost bag was his, and asks Vivek to keep it with him. He then says he has another patient to attend to, and drives away, leaving a happy Kanti with praying hands behind.

== Cast ==
- Akshay Kumar as Shiva
- Pankaj Tripathi as Kanti Sharan Mudgal
- Yami Gautam as Advocate Kamini Maheshwari
- Pavan Malhotra as Judge Purushottam Nagar
- Govind Namdev as Pandey Ji
- Arun Govil as Chairman Atal Nath Maheshwari
- Brijendra Kala as Dr. Gagan Malvia
- Johnny Rapid as a male gigolo
- Shriidhar Dubey as Chandu Padiyal
- Aarush Varma as Vivek Mudgal, Kanti's son
- Geeta Agarwal Sharma as Indumati Kanti Sharan Mudgal
- Anvesha Vij as Damayanti Mudgal, Kanti's daughter
- Hemant Choudhary as Nagdev Sir, a biology teacher
- Kshitface Pawar as Hawaldar Laalchand
- Yash Bhojwani as Anup
- Shruti Gholap as Mughda Ma'am
- Rajiv Kachroo as Sunil D'Costa
- Bhavesh Babani as Shaurya, judge Nagar's Son
- Veena Mehta as Chandu's mother
- Karan Aanand as Praful Maheshwari
- Jeetu Shastri as Pranlal Muthut
- Jyoti Tiwari as Pandeyji's daughter-in-law
- Asshriya Mishra as Pandeyji's granddaughter
- Ajoy Chakraborty as a defendant advocate
- Pratap Verma as Maulvi
- Namrata Kapoor as Mona's mother
- Gurpreet Ghuggi as a middle-aged man
- Manoj Dutt as Kanti's doctor
- Shiv Kumar Verma as a protesting man
- Parag Chhapekar as a medical store owner
- Sunil Shroff as Principal Makwana
- Rajan Bhise as Dr. BJ Shah

== Production ==
=== Development and casting ===
The film was initially rumoured to be in making in January 2021 with Akshay Kumar and Paresh Rawal returning as leads post the first part, but Rawal denied the reports. In June 2021, the sequel to OMG was finally confirmed with a new storyline starring Kumar. Pankaj Tripathi and Yami Gautam were roped in as new additions that same month, while Arun Govil joined the cast in November 2021 as the school chairman.

=== Filming ===
Tripathi began the first schedule of the film on 2 September 2021 in Mumbai. Kumar joined the sets in second schedule on 23 October 2021. The third schedule of the film commenced in December 2021.

== Music ==
OMG 2

Soundtrack album by Vikram Montrose, Hansraj Raghuwanshi, Djstrings, Pranaay, Sandesh Shandilya and Kashh
- Released: 8 August 2023
- Recorded: 2022
- Genre: Feature film soundtrack
- Length: 16:52
- Language: Hindi
- Label: Zee Music Company

Official audio
- OMG 2 - Full Album on YouTube

Singles from OMG 2
- 1. "Oonchi Oonchi Waadi" Released: 18 July 2023; 2. "Har Har Mahadev" Released: 27 July 2023

The background music of the film is composed by Mangesh Dhakde, while the soundtrack is composed by Vikram Montrose, Hansraj Raghuwanshi, Djstrings, Pranaay, Sandesh Shandilya and Kashh. The lyrics are written by Kabeer Shukla, Hansraj Raghuwanshi, Djstrings, Shekhar Astitwa, Ginny Diwan, Kashh and Sandesh Shandilya.

The first single titled "Oonchi Oonchi Waadi" was released on 18 July 2023. The second single titled "Har Har Mahadev" was released on 27 July 2023.

Track listing
No.	Title	Lyrics	Music	Singer(s)	Length
1.	"Oonchi Oonchi Waadi"	Kabeer Shukla, Hansraj Raghuwanshi, Djstrings	Djstrings	Hansraj Raghuwanshi	3:58
2.	"Har Har Mahadev"	Shekhar Astitwa	Vikram Montrose	Vikram Montrose	3:07
3.	"Ho Tayyar"	Ginny Diwan	Pranaay	Pranaay, Kailash Kher	4:02
4.	"Akelo Chal Padiyo"	Sandesh Shandilya	Sandesh Shandilya	Shradha Mishra	3:19
5.	"Mahadeva"	Kashh	Kashh	Kashh	2:25
Total length:					16:52

== Release ==
The Central Board of Film Certification advised 20 cuts in the film's screenplay and an (A) (Adults Only) certificate, as they deemed the film's subject matter, which deals with sex education in schools, along with God and religion, to be controversial and could possibly hurt the sentiments of the audience. It was also suggested that Kumar's character in the film, which was initially supposed to be that of Lord Shiva, to be changed to that of a "Messenger of God". The makers felt that this would spoil the essence of the film and limit its appeal and insisted on receiving an (U/A) (Unrestricted public exhibition subject to parental guidance for children below the age of twelve) certificate. The film was eventually passed by the Censor Board with an (A) (Adults Only) certificate with no cuts but with 25 modifications. The film was theatrically released on 11 August 2023.

=== Home media ===
The film was premiered on Netflix from 7 October 2023.

== Reception ==
=== Critical response ===
OMG 2 received mixed-to-positive reviews from critics. On the review aggregator website Rotten Tomatoes, 77% of 13 critics' reviews are positive, with an average rating of 6.4/10. The film received positive reviews from audiences.

A critic for Bollywood Hungama rated the film 4 stars out of 5 and wrote "On the whole OMG 2 is a bold, powerful, progressive, and sensitively handled film with powerful performances as its USP." Renuka Vyavahare of The Times of India rated the film 4 stars out of 5 and wrote "OMG 2 shows you how a film can be entertaining, socially relevant and informative. You don’t need to leave your brain behind to have a good laugh. Take your family along to watch this interesting blend of social commentary and humour." Tushar Joshi of India Today rated the film 4 stars out of 5 and wrote "Overall, 'OMG 2' is a film that has the right mix of everything. In short, it succeeds in being an entertainer with a valid message. Akshay Kumar's fans will be in for a huge treat where the actor delivers one of his career-best performances."

Ganesh Aaglave of Firspost rated the film 4 stars out of 5 and wrote "OMG 2 is a film, which should be watched by the audience of all the age groups as it delivers a social message, which is the need of the hour across the nation." Dishya Sharma of News18 rated the film 3.5 stars out of 5 and wrote "OMG 2 is unlike OMG: Oh My God. The first part had a little more comedy and a breezy approach. However, OMG 2 is heavy on dialogue and serious. Although it could feel preachy, it deserves a watch." Shubhra Gupta of The Indian Express rated the film 3.5 stars out of 5 and wrote "A mainstream Hindi film taking up cudgels on behalf of the proponents of catching ‘em young? Speaking straight and true? Mentioning the wonders of the Kamasutra? Opening up syllabuses to include sex education? Yes, yes, and yes. Omg."

In a negative review, Rahul Desai of Film Companion wrote "When the film belatedly wakes up to its own chauvinism, it throws in a few quick nods to the link between sexual repression and abuse. Most of them reek of tokenism." Saibal Chatterjee of NDTV wrote "To sum up, OMG 2 aspires to be as sharp as a scalpel but is actually as blunt as the back of a knife." Shilajit Mishra of The Hindu wrote "Amit Rai's fantasy film takes a light and religion-backed approach to encourage sex education in schools and homes". Deepa Gahlot of Rediff.com gave the movie 2.5 out of 5 stars and wrote "Some of the points are intelligently presented, and there are bursts of genuine humour -- Malhotra's expressions are priceless -- but the film is like an argument for the sake of argument".

Pratikshya Mishra of The Quint rated the movie 3 out 5 quints and wrote "Reviewing this film is confusing mostly because its intentions are so firmly in the right place. Further, the film is funny. The writers have found the right places to elicit laughs and it always works". Nandini Ramnath of Scroll.in gave an overall positive review for the film and wrote "The 156-minute OMG 2 always has its heart in the right place. Its concept is carefully steered, taking care to offer a progressive interpretation of Hinduism without causing offence. Yet, the use of religion to dispel misinformation as well as encourage social change sometimes comes off as a crutch, rather than a necessity".

=== Box office ===
As of 7 September 2023, the film has grossed ₹178.77 crore (US$19 million) in India, with a further ₹42.31 crore (US$4.5 million) in overseas, for a worldwide total of ₹221.08 crore (US$24 million).

== Accolades ==
Award	Ceremony date	Category	Recipients	Result	Ref.
Filmfare Awards	28 January 2024	Best Film	Cape of Good Films, Viacom18 Studios, Wakaoo Films	Nominated	
Filmfare Awards	28 January 2024	Best Director	Amit Rai	Nominated	
Filmfare Awards	28 January 2024	Best Actor (Critics)	Pankaj Tripathi	Nominated	
Filmfare Awards	28 January 2024	Best Supporting Actor	Akshay Kumar	Nominated	
Filmfare Awards	28 January 2024	Best Supporting Actress	Yami Gautam	Nominated	
Filmfare Awards	28 January 2024	Best Story	Amit Rai	Won	
Filmfare Awards	28 January 2024	Best Screenplay	Amit Rai	Nominated	
Filmfare Awards	28 January 2024	Best Dialogue	Amit Rai	Nominated	
Filmfare Awards	28 January 2024	Best Editing	Suvir Nath	Nominated	
Filmfare Awards	28 January 2024	Best Production Design	Nikhil Kovale	Nominated	

== Impact ==
Ulhasnagar Education Society announced addition of Sex education in their syllabus post the release of the film.
