= Manoj Kumar Sharma =

Indian Police Service officer (born 1975)

- Born: 3 July 1975 (age 51); Chambal, Madhya Pradesh, India
- Education: Bachelor of Arts
- Occupation: Police officer
- Spouse: Shraddha Joshi Sharma
- Children: 2
- Police career
- Service: Indian Police Service (IPS)
- Branch: Maharashtra Police
- Service years: 2005–present
- Status: Active
- Rank: Inspector General of Police

Manoj Kumar Sharma (born 3 July 1975) is an Indian Police Service (IPS) officer currently serving as the Inspector General of Police (Law & Order) of the Maharashtra Police. His journey from poverty to becoming an IPS officer was chronicled in Anurag Pathak's book Twelfth Fail, which was later adapted into the film 12th Fail (2023).

== Life ==
Sharma grew up in Bilgaon, a village in the Morena of Chambal, in Madhya Pradesh. It is part of a region historically notorious for dacoity.

Following his early education at a local school, Sharma successfully progressed through the eighth grade and later pursued his studies at Maharani Lakshmi Bai Government College of Excellence in Gwalior. However, his academic path encountered an unforeseen obstacle during the 12th grade exams. Subsequently, he gained a B.A. in Hindi and History. Sharma faced numerous challenges in his pursuit of becoming an IPS officer. After several unsuccessful attempts at the Civil Services Examination, he finally succeeded on his fourth and final attempt, securing rank 121.

Sharma became an officer in the Indian Police Service (IPS) as part of the 2005 batch, and was assigned to the Maharashtra cadre. In Mumbai Police, he has served as DCP (Zone-I) and Additional Commissioner of West Region. He was promoted as the Inspector General of Police (IG) and has served in the Central Industrial Security Force (CISF). He is serving as IG of Maharashtra Police. From May 16 2026, he has been appointed as the joint commissioner of police (law and order) in Mumbai police after a major IG rank reshuffle.

=== Personal life ===
Manoj Kumar Sharma married Shraddha Joshi Sharma, an Indian Revenue Service (IRS) officer. They have two children, a daughter named Manushree and a son, Manas. The family lives together in Mumbai.

== In popular culture ==
His journey from poverty to becoming an IPS officer was chronicled in Anurag Pathak's book Twelfth Fail. The book was later adapted into the 2023 film 12th Fail. The film was directed by Vidhu Vinod Chopra and features Vikrant Massey as Sharma. The film received widespread critical acclaim.
