= Mukherjee Nagar =

- Neighborhood of Delhi
- Location in Delhi, India
- Coordinates: 28.708588°N 77.213542°E
- Country: India
- State: Delhi
- District: North West Delhi
- Named for: Shyama Prasad Mukherjee

Population (2022)
  - Total: 79,914
- Time zone: UTC+5:30 (IST)
- PIN: 110009
- Civic agency: MCD

Mukherjee Nagar, is a neighbourhood in northern Delhi. It was named in honor of Dr. Shyama Prasad Mukherjee

== Coaching Industry ==
Mukherjee Nagar is often referred to as the UPSC Coaching hub for UPSC aspirants. The locality is dotted with a plethora of IAS coaching centers, libraries, bookshops, and hostels.

== Protests ==
Filled with a huge number of aspirants and students, Mukherjee Nagar has been the epicenter of many student agendas and protests, especially against UPSC (2013) and against SSC (2017) both of which spread quickly nationwide, and led to involvement of Government of India either in form of Judicial activism in the former, or involving inspection by CBI in the latter.

== Transit ==
1. Nearest Metro Station for Mukherjee Nagar is GTB Nagar Metro Station in Yellow Line.
2. Nearest Bus Station for Mukherjee Nagar is Mukherjee Nagar Bus Stand
