= Vikrant Massey =

Indian actor (born 1987)

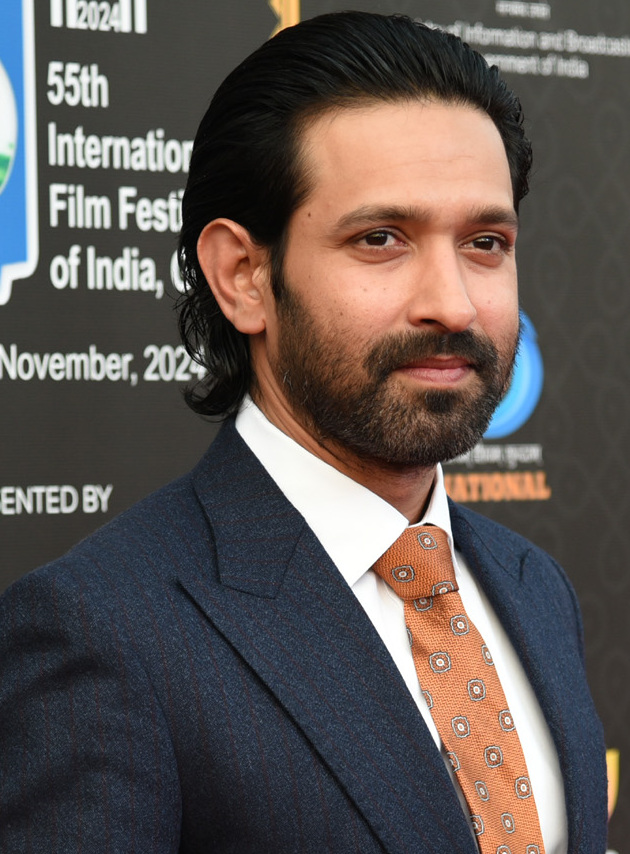
- Massey in 2024
- Born: 3 April 1987 (age 39); Mumbai, Maharashtra, India
- Education: R. D. National College
- Occupation: Actor
- Years active: 2007–present
- Spouse: Sheetal Thakur (m. 2021)
- Children: 1

Vikrant Massey (born 3 April 1987) is an Indian actor known for his work in Hindi films and television. Noted for his versatility, Massey is the recipient of a National Film Award and a Filmfare Award.

After completing his education from R. D. National College, Massey made his acting debut with the series Dhoom Machaao Dhoom (2007). He followed it up with notable roles in TV serials such as Dharam Veer (2008), Balika Vadhu (2009–2010) and Qubool Hai (2013). He progressed to Hindi cinema with supporting roles in Lootera (2013) and Dil Dhadakne Do (2015), but got his breakthrough with the independent drama A Death in the Gunj (2017).

Massey further starred in streaming series such as Mirzapur (2018), Broken But Beautiful (2018–2019) and Criminal Justice (2019). He continued to attain praise for his work in Chhapaak (2020), Haseen Dillruba (2021) and Love Hostel (2022). A turning point in his career came with the biographical film 12th Fail (2023), which emerged as a sleeper hit and earned him the National Film Award for Best Actor and Filmfare Critics Award for Best Actor.

== Early life ==
Massey was born on 3 April 1987 in Mumbai, to a Sikh mother and a Christian father, Meena and Jolly Massey. He has an older brother who took the name Moeen following his conversion to Islam at 17. Despite his multi-faith background, Massey himself is not religious, saying that "religion is man-made." Massey's parents were childhood sweethearts who eloped and got married. Belonging to a middle-class Christian family, originally from Shimla, Himachal Pradesh, Massey was born and raised by his parents in Mumbai, Maharashtra.

Massey's educational background consists of attending St. Anthony's High School in Versova with further studies being completed from R. D. National College of Arts & Science in Bandra, Mumbai. Being a well-trained dancer, he forayed onto stage with small-time dancing and theatre performances at the age of 7. With support and guidance from his teachers and school principal, he took up performing arts as a career choice at quite a young age. He enjoys travelling, playing cricket, and video games in his free time.

== Career ==
=== Television career (2007–2013) ===
Massey began his acting career with television, portraying Aamir Hassan in Dhoom Machaao Dhoom (2007). He is also a trained contemporary or jazz dancer and has worked with Shiamak Davar, and was a choreographer on the show. In 2008, he played Dharam in Dharam Veer alongside Rajat Tokas.

Massey found success with his portrayal of Shyam Singh, a supportive husband opposite Veebha Anand in Balika Vadhu, where he continued from 2009 to 2010. In Baba Aiso Varr Dhoondo (2010–11), he played his first lead role of Murli Laal. In a 2011 Hindustan Times poll looking at "The Next Big Thing" among television actors, and judged by television veterans such as J. D. Majethia, Rajan Shahi and Varun Badola, Massey's name was the only one among the male actors to have been selected by all three.

In 2013, Massey played the parallel lead in Zee TV's Qubool Hai opposite Ketki Kadam. That same year, he hosted V The Serial and Yeh Hai Aashiqui. The 2014 show, Ajab Gajab Ghar Jamai, marked his final appearance on television before film debut.

=== Recognition in films and streaming series (2013–2023) ===
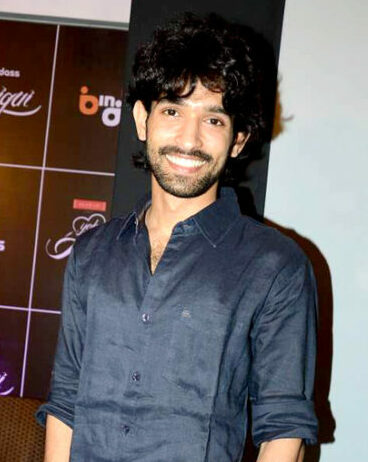
Massey in 2013

Massey made his Hindi film debut in Vikramaditya Motwane's Lootera (2013), in which he was featured as the friend of lead protagonist (Ranveer Singh). Taran Adarsh found him to be "first-rate" in his supporting part. Two years later, he had another supporting role alongside Singh in Zoya Akhtar's ensemble family drama Dil Dhadakne Do (2015), which was a box office victory.

Massey's first lead role occurred in Konkona Sen Sharma's debut directorial, the critically acclaimed independent drama A Death in the Gunj (2017). Film critic Rajeev Masand described his performance as a heartfelt one. He received a Filmfare Award for Best Actor (Critics) nomination. His other two releases of the year, Half Girlfriend and Lipstick Under My Burkha were box office averages. Ananya Bhattacharya of India Today found him to be "earnest", in his role in the former. In 2018, Massey ventured into web show with the highly-popular crime drama Mirzapur and also with the portrayal of a PTSD patient in the romantic drama Broken But Beautiful.

In 2019, Massey appeared as a murder accused in his third consecutive web show Criminal Justice directed by Tigmanshu Dhulia and Vishal Furia. Sanjukta Sharma of Scroll.in opined, "He slips into Aditya's skin without any effort showing, and makes his transformative journey compelling." He reprised his character in Broken But Beautiful 2 and also headlined Made in Heaven, a web series on two wedding planners in Delhi running an agency named Made in Heaven.

Massey began the new decade opposite Deepika Padukone in Meghna Gulzar's Chhapaak (2020), based on the life of acid attack survivor Laxmi Agarwal. The film was a commercial failure, despite a positive critical reception; Sukanya Verma stated: "Vikrant embodies a dour faced, wry-natured activist in Fabindia kurtas quite effectively." He next appeared in Cargo, which also premiered at the 2019 MAMI Film Festival under the spotlight section. That year, he also headlined the Netflix films Dolly Kitty Aur Woh Chamakte Sitare opposite Bhumi Pednekar and Ginny Weds Sunny opposite Yami Gautam.

In 2021, Massey portrayed a man who visits home for his grandfather's tehrvi in Seema Pahwa's directorial debut Ramprasad Ki Tehrvi. After the unremarkable venture Switchh, he played an electrical engineer opposite Taapsee Pannu in the mystery thriller Haseen Dillruba, which emerged as the most-watched Hindi film on Netflix and earned him his second Filmfare nomination. Shubhra Gupta from The Indian Express opined: "The only one who tries valiantly to rise, and succeeds in most places is Vikrant Massey". His last release of 2021, 14 Phere, based on inter-caste marriage issue paired him with Kriti Kharbanda. Anita Aikara of Rediff.com was appreciative of his "delightfully simple role".

Massey next essayed a Muslim man in love with a Hindu girl (played by Sanya Malhotra) in Love Hostel (2022). Released on ZEE5, it received mixed to positive reviews. His next consecutive Zee5 release was Forensic, a remake of the 2020 Malayalam film of the same name. Bollywood Hungama stated that Massey gives a "confident" performance and "suits the part", but added that in some places, he "tries" to be too funny and "fails". His first film of 2023 was Gaslight, which received mixed to negative reviews. Anuj Kumar of The Hindu said, "Massey, as the manager of the missing Raja, keep the audience engaged till the big reveal arrives." He next played a youngster struggling in Mumbai in a delayed project Mumbaikar, which was released on JioCinema.

=== 12th Fail and career progression (2023–present) ===
His last release of 2023, Vidhu Vinod Chopra's biographical drama 12th Fail, marked a significant point in Massey's career. He portrayed the real-life character of Manoj Kumar Sharma, who overcame extreme poverty to become an IPS officer. Monika Rawal Kukreja of Hindustan Times termed the film his "career-best" and noted, "Massey takes the cake for delivering a brilliant performance. At every step, he brings a myriad of shades to his character. He owns up Manoj's character in all aspects." Deepa Gahlot of Rediff.com praised Massey for giving a performance of such "unalloyed brilliance". The film emerged as a sleeper hit, grossing over ₹66 crore (US$6.9 million) worldwide, and won him the National Film Award for Best Actor (shared with Shah Rukh Khan for Jawan) and Filmfare Award for Best Actor (Critics).

In his first release of 2024, Massey played a crime reporter in Blackout alongside Mouni Roy and Ruhani Sharma, which received negative reviews from critics who were critical of his performance. Massey then reunited with Taapsee Pannu in Phir Aayi Hasseen Dillruba, reprising his character from the original. Kartik Bhardwaj of The New Indian Express opined that Vikrant, an otherwise convincing actor, "has nothing to chew on". He then played a psychopath murderer in Sector 36, which is loosely based on 2006 Noida serial murders. Shomini Sen of WION was appreciative of his performance and added that he proves his "mastery over his craft". Following this, he played a photojournalist opposite Raashii Khanna in The Sabarmati Report, based on the 2002 Godhra train burning incident. The film received mixed to negative reviews, but Rishabh Suri from Hindustan Times termed his performance "effective". Later that year, he was honoured with the IFFI Indian Film Personality of the Year Award at the 55th International Film Festival of India. In December 2024, Massey announced a career hiatus on Instagram, citing a desire to focus on his family.

Massey started 2025 with Aankhon Ki Gustaakhiyan, where he played a visually impaired musician opposite Shanaya Kapoor. Nandini Ramnath stated, "Massey looks haggard in some scenes, as though unable to shoulder the burden of Jahaan’s misery." The film underperformed commercially.he also starred in Musafir cafe(a romantic series) as lead character which streamed on Netflix

== Personal life ==
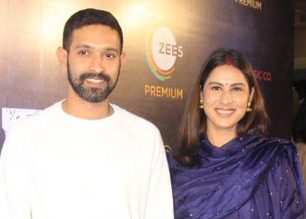
Massey with wife Sheetal Thakur in 2022

Some reports mention that Massey and actress Sheetal Thakur began dating in 2015, but became closer while working on the series Broken But Beautiful (2018). Other reports mention that Massey and Thakur met on the sets of the series and began dating. Massey and Thakur got engaged in November 2019, and registered their marriage on 14 February 2022. On 18 February 2022, Massey married Thakur, in a traditional Himachali Hindu ceremony in her ancestoral home in Shahtalai, Bilaspur district in Himachal Pradesh. They have one child, a son born on 7 February 2024.

== Artistry and media image ==
Dipti Nagpaul D'Souza of The Indian Express stated that Massey has always played "likeable roles" in television soaps. Asianet News termed him "one of the finest actors" of his generation and added, "Throughout his prolific career, he has consistently chosen unconventional roles that have left a lasting impression on audiences." Film Companion noted, "Vikrant has been consistently prolific and made a mark with every performance, regardless of the scope, nature or length of a role." Priyanka Roy from The Telegraph said, "Vikrant, who's had success across mediums, is that rare breed who doesn't shun the relatively smaller parts even when he's now transitioned to lead roles."

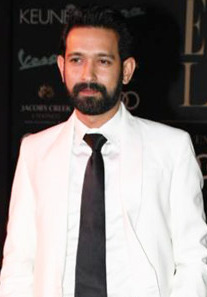
Massey in 2023

Massey is known for playing characters that the audience relates to. Prateek Sur of Outlook agreed and noted, "One will find the character living the best up to his potential on the screen when Vikrant is playing it. He has always justified himself as a performer." Kartik Bhardwaj of The New Indian Express said that Massey brings "easy relatability" to his roles, he noted, "On account of the nuanced roles he generally excels in, Massey might not come across as a song-and-dance actor but you feel an air of gentle reassurance in his character." Hitanshi Kamdar of Grazia added, "Massey has essayed a litany of easy-going and complex characters over the course of his unmistakably impressive career trajectory."

Members of the film industry have praised Massey for his talent. Filmmaker Vidhu Vinod Chopra termed him one of the finest actors of the country. His A Death in the Gunj director Konkona Sen Sharma called him a "receptive actor" and said, "Vikrant got a sense of the character from the script and made it his own. It's important to note that he's not only capable of playing someone vulnerable and diffident [like his character in Gunj] but also someone more gregarious and volatile because he can pick up what is required."

For his performance in 2020, Eastern Eye placed Massey at 48th position in its "Top 50 Asian Celebrities " list. Subhash K. Jha of Rediff.com and Santanu Das of Hindustan Times placed Massey in their "Top Performance of 2023" list, for 12th Fail. His performance in A Death in the Gunj, is regarded as one of the "100 Greatest Performances of the Decade" by Film Companion. In addition to his acting career, Massey is a celebrity endorser for brands and products such as Lenskart, Cornetto, Cadbury, ICICI Bank, Nescafé, Longines, and Samsung Galaxy. During the COVID-19 pandemic, Massey collaborated with Citta, to provide emotional support to the patients. In 2020, he also appeared in Jonita Gandhi's music video #AageKiSoch, to create awareness related to the pandemic.

== Filmography ==
Key
†	Denotes films that have not yet been released

=== Films ===
List of Vikrant Massey film credits
Year	Title	Role	Notes	Ref.
2013	Lootera	Devdas "Dev" Mukherjee		
2015	Dil Dhadakne Do	Rana Khanna		
2017	A Death in the Gunj	Shyamal "Shutu" Chatterjee		
2017	Half Girlfriend	Shailesh Pandey		
2017	Lipstick Under My Burkha	Arshad Sumbli		
2020	Chhapaak	Amol Gupta		
2020	Cargo	Prahastha Tawde		
2020	Dolly Kitty Aur Woh Chamakte Sitare	Pradeep Kushwaha		
2020	Ginny Weds Sunny	Sunny Sethi		
2021	Ramprasad Ki Tehrvi	Rahul Joshi		
2021	Switchh	Samar Kapoor		
2021	Haseen Dillruba	Rishabh "Rishu" Saxena		
2021	14 Phere	Sanjay "Sanju" Lal Singh		
2022	Love Hostel	Ahmed Shaukeen		
2022	Forensic	Johnny Khanna		
2023	Gaslight	Kapil		
2023	Mumbaikar	Youngster		
2023	12th Fail	Manoj Kumar Sharma		
2024	Blackout	Lenny D’Souza		
2024	Phir Aayi Hasseen Dillruba	Rishabh "Rishu" Saxena		
2024	Sector 36	Prem Singh		
2024	The Sabarmati Report	Samar Kumar		
2025	Aankhon Ki Gustaakhiyan	Jahaan		
2026	O'Romeo	Mehmood Qureshi "Billu"	Cameo appearance	
2027	Chauhaan †	TBA	Filming	
TBA	Yaar Jigri †	TBA	Post-production	
TBA	Talaakhon Mein Ek †	TBA	Post-production	

=== Television ===
List of Vikrant Massey television credits
Year	Title	Role	Notes	Ref.
2007	Dhoom Machaao Dhoom	Aamir Hassan		
2008	Dharam Veer	Dharam		
2009–2010	Balika Vadhu	Shyam Singh		
2010–2011	Baba Aiso Varr Dhoondo	Murli Laal		
2011	Jhalak Dikhhla Jaa 4	Guest Contestant	Episodes 7–8	
2012	Gumrah: End of Innocence	Shobhit		
2012–2013	V The Serial	Host		
2013	Qubool Hai	Ayaan Ahmed Khan		
2013	Yeh Hai Aashiqui	Host		
2014	Ajab Gajab Ghar Jamai	Rajeshwar		
2017	Rise	Shrey		
2018	Mirzapur	Vinay "Bablu" Pandit	Season 1	
2018	Teen Paheliyan	Sid	Segment: "Copy"	
2018–2021	Broken But Beautiful	Veer Goenka	2 seasons	
2019	Criminal Justice	Aditya Sharma		
2019–2023	Made in Heaven	Nawab Khan	2 seasons	
2026	Pritam and Pedro	Martin Fonseca		
2026	Musafir Cafe	Chander Mohan Sharma		

=== Short films ===
List of Vikrant Massey short films credits
Year	Title	Role	Ref.
2014	Best Girlfriend	Karan	
2017	Detour	Aarav	
2020	Half Full	Abhay Khanna	
2020	Gadhedo: Donkey	Goru Dhobi	

== Accolades ==
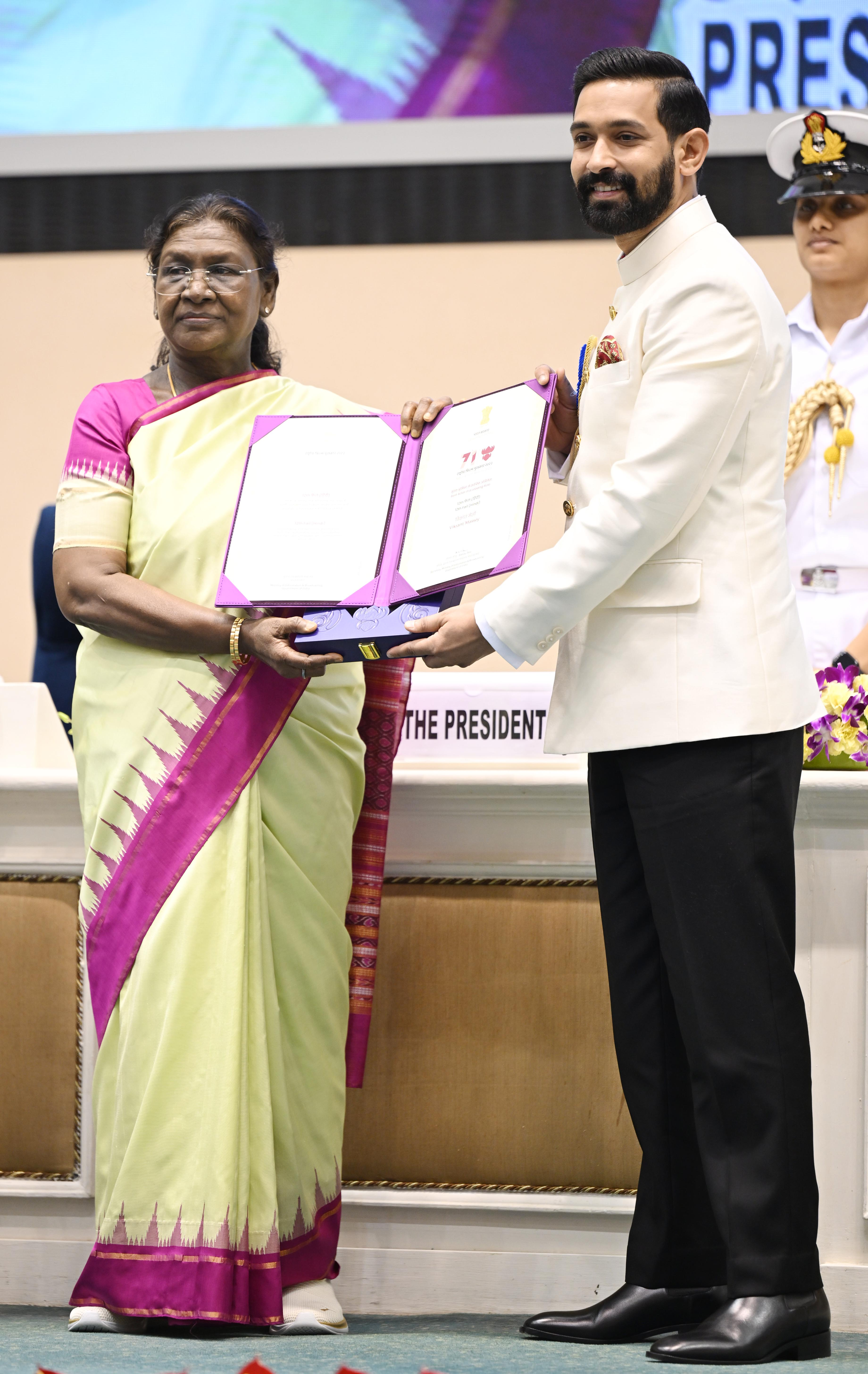
Massey winning the Best Actor award at 71st National Film Awards, 2025

List of Vikrant Massey awards and nominations
Year	Award	Category	Work	Result	Ref.
2024	Bollywood Hungama Style Icons	Most Stylish Screen-Stealer of the Year	—N/a	Nominated	
2018	Filmfare Awards	Best Actor – Critics	A Death in the Gunj	Nominated	
2022	Filmfare Awards	Best Actor – Critics	Haseen Dilruba	Nominated	
2024	Filmfare Awards	Best Actor – Critics	12th Fail	Won	
2022	Filmfare OTT Awards	Best Actor in a Web Original Film	Forensic	Nominated	
2025	Filmfare OTT Awards	Best Actor (Critics) in a Web Original Film	Sector 36	Won	
2021	GQ Awards	Acting Excellence	—N/a	Won	
2024	Indian Film Festival of Melbourne	Best Actor	12th Fail	Nominated	
2024	Indian Film Festival of Melbourne	Best Performance – Critics Choice	12th Fail	Won	
2008	Indian Television Academy Awards	GR8! Face of the Year – Male	Dharam Veer	Won	
2019	Indian Television Academy Awards	Best Actor – Web Series	Criminal Justice	Won	
2008	Indian Telly Awards	Fresh New Face – Male	Dharam Veer	Nominated	
2009	Indian Telly Awards	Best Actor in a Supporting Role	Balika Vadhu	Nominated	
2023	National Film Awards	Best Actor	12th Fail	Won	
2024	Pinkvilla Screen and Style Icons Awards	Best Actor - Popular Choice	12th Fail	Nominated	
2024	Pinkvilla Screen and Style Icons Awards	Best Actor – Jury Choice	12th Fail	Won	
2025	Pinkvilla Screen and Style Icons Awards	Best Actor OTT – Jury Choice	Sector 36	Won	
2016	Screen Awards	Best Ensemble Cast	Dil Dhadakne Do	Won	
2024	Zee Cine Awards	Best Actor – Male	12th Fail	Nominated	
