= Wazir (soundtrack) =

2015 film soundtrack album

Wazir (Original Motion Picture Soundtrack)

Soundtrack album by Shantanu Moitra, Ankit Tiwari, Advaita, Prashant Pillai, Rochak Kohli and Gaurav Godkhindi
- Released: 18 December 2015
- Recorded: 2015
- Genre: Feature film soundtrack; sufi; qawwali
- Length: 26:47
- Language: Hindi
- Label: T-Series

Wazir (Original Motion Picture Soundtrack) is the soundtrack album to the 2016 film of the same name directed by Bejoy Nambiar and produced by Vidhu Vinod Chopra under Vinod Chopra Films. The album features seven songs composed by an assortment of musicians: Shantanu Moitra, Ankit Tiwari, Advaita, Prashant Pillai, Rochak Kohli and Gaurav Godkhindi. Lyrics for the songs were written by Chopra, Manoj Muntashir, Swanand Kirkire, A. M. Turaz, Abhijeet Deshpande, Gurpreet Saini and Deepak Ramola. The album was released under the T-Series label on 18 December 2015 to positive response from critics.

== Background ==
Like Nambiar's previous films, the soundtrack to Wazir featured seven songs composed by an ensemble of musicians. Shantanu Moitra, who worked with Chopra on most of his productions and directorials, had composed two tracks—"Tere Bin" and "Maula Mere Maula". Nambiar's regular collaborator Prashant Pillai, along with Ankit Tiwari and Rochak Kohli had composed one song each, while Gaurav Godkhindi composed the theme track of the film. Post-fusion rock band Advaita made their film debut with the song "Khel Khel Main"—a previous composition which had been recreated for Bachchan's vocals. Rohit Kulkarni composed the background score.

== Release ==
The album rights of the film were acquired by T-Series. "Tere Bin", the first single track, was released individually on 4 December 2015. The video focuses on Farhan Akhtar and Aditi Rao Hydari; the song is sung by Sonu Nigam and Shreya Ghoshal and composed by Shantanu Moitra, with lyrics penned by Chopra. The next two single tracks were released at one-week intervals after the first: "Tu Mere Pass", the second single track, was composed and sung by Ankit Tiwari with lyrics by Manoj Muntashir, and the third, "Maula Mere Maula", was composed by Moitra, sung by Javed Ali and written by Chopra and Swanand Kirkire. The song was released on the same date as the album, 18 December 2015.

== Critical response ==
Joginder Tuteja of Bollywood Hungama wrote: "Wazir has a fair mix of songs that are situational and also that could find popularity over a period of time. Though one isn't quite hunting for any solid chartbusters here, the music does work well in the context of the film." R.M. Vijayakar of India-West summed up with, "In short, three decent songs and three eminently forgettable songs makes for a mixed listening experience. Take it or skip it." Aelina Kapoor from Rediff.com commented, "Wazir has good situational soundtracks that don't aim to set any records but go well with the theme of the film."

Kasmin Fernandes of The Times of India summarized that, the soundtrack "sets a mysterious mood for the film". Suanshu Khurana of The Indian Express wrote: "Vidhu Vinod Chopra's Wazir is a winner in terms of variety and voices. Too many cooks mostly end up spoiling the broth but Nambiar needs to be credited for a brilliant selection of composers who've delivered an eclectic mix." Karthik Srinivasan of Milliblog, however, stated that "Wazir's soundtrack is the weakest amongst Bejoy's three films."

== Track listing ==
Wazir (Original Motion Picture Soundtrack) track listing
No.	Title	Lyrics	Music	Singer(s)	Length
1.	"Tere Bin"	Vidhu Vinod Chopra	Shantanu Moitra	Sonu Nigam, Shreya Ghoshal	4:05
2.	"Tu Mere Paas"	Manoj Muntashir	Ankit Tiwari	Ankit Tiwari	3:46
3.	"Maula Mere Maula"	Vidhu Vinod Chopra, Swanand Kirkire	Shantanu Moitra	Javed Ali	6:42
4.	"Tere Liye"	A. M. Turaz	Prashant Pillai	Gagan Baderiya, Prashant Pillai	2:58
5.	"Khel Khel Mein"	Abhijeet Deshpande	Advaita	Amitabh Bachchan	3:59
6.	"Atrangi Yaari"	Gurpreet Saini, Deepak Ramola	Rochak Kohli	Amitabh Bachchan, Farhan Akhtar	3:37
7.	"Wazir Theme"	Instrumental	Gaurav Godkhindi	Instrumental	3:00
Total length:					26:47
