= Vinod Chopra Films =

Indian film production company

- Company type: Private Limited Company
- Industry: Motion pictures
- Founded: 1985
- Founder: Vidhu Vinod Chopra
- Headquarters: Mumbai, India
- Key people: Vidhu Vinod Chopra
- Products: Film production

Vinod Chopra Films is an Indian film production company owned and operated by Hindi film-maker Vidhu Vinod Chopra. It was founded by Chopra in 1985. It has made many major Bollywood films since then.

== Film production ==
| Release date | Film | Director | Other notes | Writer |
|---|---|---|---|---|
| 14 March 1986 | Khamosh | Vidhu Vinod Chopra | The studio's first release as Vinod Chopra Films | Vidhu Vinod Chopra, Ranjit Kapoor, Saeed Akhtar Mirza, Sudhir Mishra, Kundan Shah and Manjul Sinha |
| 3 November 1989 | Parinda | Vidhu Vinod Chopra | Won 2 National Film Awards Won 6 Filmfare Awards | Screenplay by Shiv Kumar Subramaniam, Story by Nana Patekar and Ishraq-Suja |
| 15 April 1994 | 1942: A Love Story | Vidhu Vinod Chopra | Won 9 Filmfare Awards | Sanjay Leela Bhansali, Vidhu Vinod Chopra and Kamna Chandra |
| 17 July 1998 | Kareeb | Vidhu Vinod Chopra | Promos by Rajkumar Hirani | Kamna Chandra and Abhijat Joshi |
| 27 October 2000 | Mission Kashmir | Vidhu Vinod Chopra | Nominated - Filmfare Award for Best Film Nominated - Filmfare Award for Best Director | Vikram Chandra, Vidhu Vinod Chopra, Abhijat Joshi, Suketu Mehta and Atul Tiwari |
| 19 December 2003 | Munna Bhai M.B.B.S. | Rajkumar Hirani | Won National Film Award for Best Popular Film Providing Wholesome Entertainment Won 4 Filmfare Awards | Screenplay by Rajkumar Hirani, Vidhu Vinod Chopra and Lajan Joseph Oommen; Story by Rajkumar Hirani and Vidhu Vinod Chopra |
| 10 June 2005 | Parineeta | Pradeep Sarkar | Won Indira Gandhi Award for Best Debut Film of a Director Won 5 Filmfare Awards | Vidhu Vinod Chopra and Pradeep Sarkar |
| 1 September 2006 | Lage Raho Munna Bhai | Rajkumar Hirani | Won 4 National Film Awards Won 4 Filmfare Awards | Rajkumar Hirani and Abhijat Joshi |
| 16 February 2007 | Eklavya: The Royal Guard | Vidhu Vinod Chopra | Submitted to the 80th Academy Awards for Academy Award for Best Foreign Language Film | Vidhu Vinod Chopra and Abhijat Joshi |
| 25 December 2009 | 3 Idiots | Rajkumar Hirani | Won 3 National Film Awards Won 6 Filmfare Awards | Rajkumar Hirani and Abhijat Joshi |
| 15 June 2012 | Ferrari Ki Sawaari | Rajesh Mapuskar | Rajesh Mapuskar's debut film | Rajesh Mapuskar and Vidhu Vinod Chopra |
| 19 December 2014 | PK | Rajkumar Hirani | Co-produced with UTV Motion Pictures and Rajkumar Hirani Films | Rajkumar Hirani and Abhijat Joshi |
| 16 January 2015 (US) | Broken Horses | Vidhu Vinod Chopra | Co-produced with Reliance Entertainment | Vidhu Vinod Chopra and Abhijat Joshi |
| 8 January 2016 | Wazir | Bejoy Nambiar | Co-produced with Rajkumar Hirani Films and Getaway Films | Vidhu Vinod Chopra and Abhijat Joshi |
| 29 June 2018 | Sanju | Rajkumar Hirani | Starring Ranbir Kapoor as Sanjay Dutt and Co-produced with Rajkumar Hirani Films | Rajkumar Hirani and Abhijat Joshi |
| 1 February 2019 | Ek Ladki Ko Dekha Toh Aisa Laga | Shelly Chopra Dhar | Starring Anil Kapoor, Sonam Kapoor, Rajkummar Rao and Juhi Chawla | Gazal Dhaliwal and Shelly Chopra Dhar |
| 7 February 2020 | Shikara | Vidhu Vinod Chopra | Starring Aadil Khan and Sadia Khateeb | Vidhu Vinod Chopra, Rahul Pandita and Abhijat Joshi |
| 27 October 2023 | 12th Fail | Vidhu Vinod Chopra | Starring Vikrant Massey and Medha Shankar | Vidhu Vinod Chopra |

== Highest-grossing films (under Chopra's vice-chairmanship) ==
Highest-grossing films (under Chopra's vice-chairmanship)
| Rank | Name | Year of release | Domestic Gross (adjusted for inflation) | Starring | Director |
|---|---|---|---|---|---|
| 1 | PK | 2014 | ₹7.35 billion (US$77 million) | Aamir Khan & Anushka Sharma | Rajkumar Hirani |
| 2 | 3 Idiots | 2009 | ₹3.93 billion (US$41 million) | Aamir Khan & Kareena Kapoor | Rajkumar Hirani |
