= Parinda =

1989 film by Vidhu Vinod Chopra

- Theatrical release poster
- Directed by: Vidhu Vinod Chopra
- Screenplay by: Shiv Kumar Subramaniam
- Story by: Vidhu Vinod Chopra
- Produced by: Vidhu Vinod Chopra
- Starring: Jackie Shroff; Anil Kapoor; Nana Patekar; Madhuri Dixit; Anupam Kher; Suresh Oberoi
- Cinematography: Binod Pradhan
- Edited by: Renu Saluja
- Music by: Songs: R. D. Burman; Score: Manohari Singh; Babloo Chakravorty
- Production company: Vinod Chopra Productions
- Release date: 3 November 1989
- Running time: 148 minutes
- Country: India
- Language: Hindi
- Budget: ₹12 lakh
- Box office: ₹9 crore

Parinda (transl. Bird) is a 1989 Indian Hindi-language crime drama film directed, produced and distributed by Vidhu Vinod Chopra. The film stars Jackie Shroff, Anil Kapoor, Nana Patekar and Madhuri Dixit. The story and scenario were written by Chopra, while Shiv Kumar Subramaniam and Imtiyaz Husain wrote the screenplay and dialogues, respectively. R. D. Burman composed the music and Khurshid Hallauri wrote the lyrics. Binod Pradhan served as the film's cinematographer and Renu Saluja was its editor.

Parinda's story is loosely inspired by Marlon Brando starrer On the Waterfront. Parinda follows Kishan (Shroff), who works for the underworld chieftain Anna (Patekar). Kishan's brother Karan (Kapoor) returns home after completing his studies in the United States. The two brothers are caught on different sides of a gang war after Karan decides to avenge his friend's death by Anna.

Chopra conceived the film after his low-budget suspense thriller Khamosh (1985) failed to find a distributor for a theatrical release. This motivated him to make a more mainstream film with well-known actors. Parinda received critical acclaim when released. It is considered by several critics and scholars to be the turning point in the introduction of realism in Hindi cinema. Parinda won two National Film Awards and five Filmfare Awards, and was India's official selection for the 1990 Academy Award for Best Foreign Language Film, but it was not nominated. In 1998, remade in Tamil as Aasai Thambi. In 2015, Chopra remade Parinda as an American film titled Broken Horses.

== Plot ==
Kishan and Karan are orphaned brothers who grew up on the streets of Bombay. To provide Karan with a better upbringing and education, Kishan works for Anna Seth, a gangster who owns an oil factory as a front for his illegal activities. Unaware of his brother's affiliation with a gang, Karan returns to Bombay after completing his studies in the United States. Inspector Prakash, Karan's friend, knows Anna is a gangster, but he is unable to arrest him due to lack of evidence. Anna plans to have Prakash killed during his reunion with Karan. Attempting to prevent this, Kishan books an earlier flight for Karan, but it is delayed and Anna's henchmen shoot Prakash, who dies in Karan's arms.

Paro, Prakash's sister and Karan's childhood friend, believes Karan is responsible for her brother's death. Karan learns from Anna's former messenger Iqbal that Anna is Kishan's boss and that Anna orchestrated Prakash's murder. He is also told that Anna burned his wife and developed pyrophobia. Karan tells Paro that Anna and Kishan killed Prakash; they fall in love with each other.

A few days later, Abdul is arrested and Karan recognises him as one of Prakash's killers. Kishan warns Karan against testifying, and is wounded when Anna's henchmen shoot at Karan. When Karan is summoned to identify the assailants at police headquarters, Abdul extorts his silence, threatening that Kishan will be killed by his home nurse if Karan testifies. Karan decides not to testify, and instead joins Anna's gang to get close to the crime boss. Anna tests Karan's resolve by ordering him to shoot Iqbal, who shoots himself so Karan can continue his plan without guilt.

The next day, Anna orders Karan to kill rival gangster Musa, while accompanied by his gunman Francis. Karan kills Francis and joins Musa instead. Karan abducts Anna's aide Rama Reddy and brings him to Musa. Karan takes pictures of Rama and Musa together to convince Anna that Rama betrayed him and shot Francis. Karan then murders Rama on Anna's orders. With Musa's help, Karan kills Abdul and completes his mission to avenge Prakash's murder. Karan and Paro are married, and plan on leaving the city. Told by Musa that Karan had been manipulating him, Anna shoots and kills Karan and Paro on their wedding night. To avenge his brother's death, Kishan goes to Anna's residence and burns him to death.

== Cast ==
- Jackie Shroff as Kishan Choudhary
- Anil Kapoor as Karan Choudhary
- Madhuri Dixit as Paromita "Paro" Nair
- Nana Patekar as Anna
- Anupam Kher as Inspector Prakash Nair
- Suresh Oberoi as Abdul Khan
- Tom Alter as Musa
- Anang Desai as Inspector Mirani
- Kamal Chopra as Rama Reddy
- Shiv Kumar Subramaniam as Francis
- Achyut Potdar as a Marriage Priest
- Vidhu Vinod Chopra as a corpse
- Sameer Khakhar as Iqbal
- Dilip Kulkarni as Inspector Chauhan

== Production ==
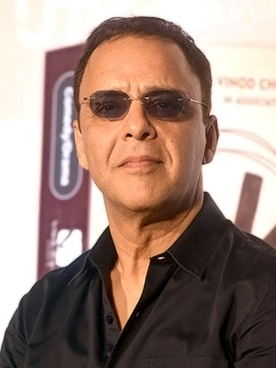
Vidhu Vinod Chopra based the story of Parinda on two real life brothers who worked for a gangster.

In 1985, director Vidhu Vinod Chopra made the suspense thriller film Khamosh, starring Naseeruddin Shah, Shabana Azmi and Amol Palekar. The film failed to find distributors and Chopra released a single print at Mumbai's Regal Cinema. In retrospect, Chopra expressed his frustration that nobody would buy Khamosh and he decided to make a more commercial Hindi film about two brothers on the streets of Mumbai, which became Parinda. The story was based on two non-fictional brothers who worked for a gangster named Ashwin Naik. Chopra cast Nana Patekar in the elder brother's role after he saw him in a play called Purush. Anil Kapoor, who was cast in the role of Karan, told Chopra that Patekar was not suitable for the role of his elder brother. Patekar was then offered the role of Anna, the film's antagonist. Shah and Patekar were considered for the role of Kishan, which later went to Jackie Shroff. Kapoor asked Shroff to play his elder brother. Shroff was initially hesitant to do the film because he did not want to get typecast in the elder brother role. Later, Kapoor made Shroff listen to the songs and he agreed to do the film.

The location where Musa (Tom Alter) meets Kishan in the film was a water tank on Antop Hill, which was spread with the scrap of nearby slum dwellers. Chopra had rented the site from Brihanmumbai Municipal Corporation for ₹500 (US$5.20). The film was initially named Kabutarkhana (pigeon accommodation), but was later changed to Parinda. While filming the final scene's fire sequence, the film's crew lost control of a fire they built using rubber solution and petrol, leading to Patekar suffering from serious burns. He was critically injured and hospitalised for nearly two months, and returned to filming after a year. The set was rebuilt in Film City, where the fire sequence was re-shot under more controlled conditions.

Scenes were shot in natural lighting with light coming through the windows or candles in the indoor scenes. Binod Pradhan, the cinematographer, decided to use shadow lighting as he was tired of the way Hindi films were lit. His main inspiration for the visuals of Parinda was Gordon Willis's cinematography in The Godfather (1972). He had put diffusion materials, like a piece of white cloth or tracing paper, in front of the light to make it softer and more natural. According to Chopra, the use of natural lighting was a way for them to function on a limited budget. To decide the look and texture of the film, Chopra and Pradhan looked at the paintings of Rembrandt, Vincent van Gogh and Leonardo da Vinci.

The sequence in which Karan and Prakash reunite was filmed at Kabootar Khana, a Mumbai landmark where hundreds of pigeons gather. Chopra said this location was "one of the first things I spotted, probably because of all the pigeons flying around, when I stepped out of Dadar station. I thought [that] the pigeons would [...] convey the concept of emancipation of the spirit of the dying man". Shopkeepers in that area shut their shops for the shoot, believing that Chopra was the younger brother of the Prime Minister. The film's climax, when Anna kills Paro and Kishan, was shot at the Gateway of India over three years on New Year's Eve, as they did not have the budget to assemble a crowd. Parinda was shot over the course of 66 working days. Some sequences were also shot at the Babulnath temple. The song "Pyar Ke Mod Pe" was shot in six to seven minutes as Chopra wanted to shoot the entire song in one sunset. The shoestring budget also resulted in Chopra and Patekar bringing their own water bottles to set. Suresh Oberoi learned to play the flute from Danny Denzongpa, who had earlier been cast in the role of Abdul but was unable to perform in the film.

Sanjay Leela Bhansali served as the associate director for songs in the film. The editing was done by Renu Saluja. For a shot in the film where Shroff slaps Kapoor, Kapoor completed 30 takes until he was satisfied with his performance. The screenplay of Parinda was written by Chopra and Shiv Kumar Subramaniam, who also acted in the film. The dialogues were penned by Imtiyaz Husain. Made on a production budget of ₹1.2 million (US$12,000), the entire film was shot and set in Mumbai; it was distributed by Vinod Chopra Films.

== Music ==
Parinda

Soundtrack album by R. D. Burman
- Released: January 1989
- Genre: Feature film soundtrack
- Length: 26:12
- Language: Hindi
- Label: Tips Industries Limited
- Producers: Weston Musicassettes, R. D. Burman

The film score was composed by Manohari Singh and Babloo Chakravorty while the songs were composed by R. D. Burman with their lyrics written by Khurshid Hallauri. The album consisted of seven songs, including two versions of "Kitni Hai Pyari Pyari"—one sad and one slow. The song "Tum Se Milke" also had a sad version. The vocals were performed by Asha Bhosle, Suresh Wadkar, Sadhana Sargam and Shailendra Singh. The soundtrack album of the film was released in January 1989 under the banner of Weston Musicassettes (now Tips Industries Limited). It marked the debut of Shantanu Mukherjee (later known as Shaan) and Sagarika Mukherjee as an adult playback singer.

Filmfare wrote about Parinda's music in their "100 Filmfare Days" series, stating, "RD Burman's music adds depth to Parinda's drama". The music of "Tum Se Milke" is based on Leo Sayer's 1977 single "When I Need You".

Track listing
No.	Title	Singer(s)	Length
1.	"Kitni Hai Pyari Pyari"	Suresh Wadkar, Shailendra Singh	04:14
2.	"Pyar Ke Mod Pe"	Suresh Wadkar, Asha Bhosle	06:31
3.	"Sehra Mein Dulha Hoga"	Suresh Wadkar, Shailendra Singh	06:32
4.	"Tum Se Milke"	Suresh Wadkar, Asha Bhosle	05:11
5.	"Kitni Hai Pyari Pyari" (Sad)	Shantanu Mukherjee, Sagarika Mukherjee, Sadhana Sargam	01:39
6.	"Kitni Hai Pyari Pyari" (Slow)	Suresh Wadkar, Shailendra Singh	00:48
7.	"Tum Se Milke" (Sad)	Suresh Wadkar, Asha Bhosle, R. D. Burman	01:17

== Release, reception and legacy ==
Parinda was released theatrically on 3 November 1989. In a 2010 interview, film critic and Chopra's wife Anupama Chopra noted, "there was so much buzz about Parinda" before its release. After the film's release, Chopra went to Alankar cinema in Girgaon to see the audience's reactions, but found some people were not happy with it because the lead characters are killed.

Parinda is credited by several critics for introducing realism into mainstream Hindi cinema and redefining the portrayal of the underworld in films. It is also considered a landmark film and one of the best of Indian cinema. Cinematographer Sudeep Chatterjee felt that during the 1970s and 1980s "the image lost its importance". He credits Parinda for changing that and said the film "introduced a completely new imagery, started a new trend." The film was included in News18's 2013 list of the "100 greatest Indian films of all time", Mint's list of "70 iconic films of Indian cinema", Filmfare's "100 Filmfare Days" series, the "70 iconic movies of independent India" list and the book 100 Bollywood Films by Rachel Dwyer. Chopra, despite having made two critically acclaimed films, remained relatively unknown until Parinda's release. While reviewing Vikram Chandra's 2007 novel Sacred Games, critic Carl Bromley called the film "hands down the most powerful and influential Hindi gangster film of the last two decades." He also mentioned that the book's legacy "might prove similar to Parinda's." Abhishek Srivastava of Firstpost called the film "in true sense a precursor to the mafia films Ram Gopal Varma experimented with".

Filmmaker Nikkhil Advani credits Parinda for changing his life and inspiring him to become a director. Director Dibakar Banerjee said in an interview that Parinda was a game-changer for him. Anurag Kashyap said the first two Indian films which "impacted" him with their violence were Parinda and Shiva (1990). He said the scene involving a dead body being dumped inside a wood machine, Patekar's character and the fire scene in the climax, had an emotional impact on him. The film is credited for showing the way for realistic crime films in Hindi cinema in the following years. Patekar's role as the psychopathic don is considered to be one of the best performances of his career. Film-critic Gayatri Gauri of Firstpost wrote, "Parinda was well-crafted, slickly-written and brilliantly executed". It was selected as the official Indian submission for the 1990 Academy Award for Best Foreign Language Film but was not nominated.

Chopra co-wrote, produced and directed Broken Horses (2015), an English-language Hollywood remake of Parinda. The film starred Vincent D'Onofrio, Anton Yelchin and Chris Marquette (corresponding to the roles of Anna, Karan and Kishan, respectively). It was released on 9 April 2015, receiving generally unfavorable reviews and became a box office failure.

In 2012, several films of Chopra were released theatrically as part of a retrospective, including Parinda. In April 2017, Chopra submitted the supplementary materials from six of his films to the preservation vaults of National Film Archive of India. The materials include lobby cards, film posters, song booklets, contact sheets, promotional catalogues and working stills from Khamosh, Parinda, 1942: A Love Story (1994), Mission Kashmir (2000) and Eklavya: The Royal Guard (2007). The film is also available on Netflix.

== Analysis ==
Parinda is noted for the realism it introduced to mainstream Hindi cinema; several critics drew parallels between the violence and the location in the film. Author and film professor Ranjani Mazumdar in her book Bombay Cinema: An Archive of the City wrote that Parinda uses some popular locations such as the Gateway of India, a nearby fountain and the Babulnath temple as "spaces of terror". She wrote, "These display sites, which are central to the cartography of Bombay, are turned into nodes of violence and death". Mazumdar also said the film destroyed the image of Bombay as the 'dream city' and turned it into a violent nightmare. According to Filmfare, the film blurs the lines of black and white for its heroes and adds shades of grey to the villain; writing, "As two brothers face-off on conflicting sides of morality, Parinda speaks of themes like family values, bonding, unemployment, illegal trades etc." Ashish Rajadhyaksha and Paul Willemen note in their book Encyclopaedia of Indian Cinema that Parinda represented a "postmodern variation" of the crime genre in Hindi cinema.

The film also explores the themes of childhood and memory; all its major characters are orphans. The city in the film is shattered into "dark, morbid spaces with all the characters framed within a light and shadow zone". Tapan K. Ghosh, in his book Bollywood Baddies: Villains, Vamps and Henchmen in Hindi Cinema, said the film showcased the sociopolitical scenario of that time and showed "smuggling rivalry on a gruesome scale". Authors Swaralipi Nandi and Esha Chatterjee, in their book Spectacles of Blood: A Study of Masculinity and Violence in Postcolonial Films, drew metaphorical similarities between Parinda and Martin Scorsese's crime film Mean Streets (1973), saying both films explore the masculinity of young men who commit violence and reject societal norms because of a lack of guidance. Through its frequent use of night shots and dark spaces, Parinda uses the aesthetics of film noir in its visual style.

== Accolades ==
At the 37th National Film Awards, Patekar received the National Film Award for Best Supporting Actor for Parinda and Saluja the Best Editing Award. At the 35th Filmfare Awards, the film was nominated in six categories and won five of them.

Award	Category	Nominee	Result	Ref.
37th National Film Awards	Best Supporting Actor	Nana Patekar	Won	
37th National Film Awards	Best Editing	Renu Saluja	Won	
35th Filmfare Awards	Best Film	Vidhu Vinod Chopra	Nominated	
35th Filmfare Awards	Best Director	Vidhu Vinod Chopra	Won	
35th Filmfare Awards	Best Actor	Jackie Shroff	Won	
35th Filmfare Awards	Best Supporting Actor	Nana Patekar	Won	
35th Filmfare Awards	Best Screenplay	Shiv Kumar Subramaniam	Won	
35th Filmfare Awards	Best Editing	Renu Saluja	Won	

== See also ==
- List of submissions to the 62nd Academy Awards for Best Foreign Language Film
- List of Indian submissions for the Academy Award for Best Foreign Language Film

== Sources ==
- Chaudhuri, Diptakirti (2014). Bollybook: The Big Book of Hindi-language film Trivia. Penguin UK. ISBN 978-9-3511-8799-8. Archived from the original on 24 December 2023.
- Ghosh, Tapan K. (2013). Bollywood Baddies: Villains, Vamps and Henchmen in Hindi Cinema. SAGE Publications India. ISBN 978-8-1321-1326-3. Archived from the original on 24 December 2023.
- Lalitha, Gopalan (2002). Cinema of Interruptions: Action Genres in Contemporary Indian Cinema. British Film Institute. p. 144. ISBN 978-0-85170-923-9. Archived from the original on 24 December 2023.
- Mazumdar, Ranjani (2007). Bombay Cinema: An Archive of the City. U of Minnesota Press. ISBN 978-1-4529-1302-5. Archived from the original on 24 December 2023.
- Mehta, Suketu (2004). Maximum City: Bombay Lost & Found. Penguin Random House. ISBN 978-9-3868-1584-2. Archived from the original on 24 December 2023.
- Miguel, Helio San (2012). Mumbai. Intellect Books. ISBN 978-1-84150-632-6. Archived from the original on 24 December 2023.
- Nandi, Swaralipi; Chatterjee, Esha (2014). Spectacles of Blood: A Study of Masculinity and Violence in Postcolonial Films. Zubaan. ISBN 978-9-3830-7413-6. Archived from the original on 24 December 2023.
- Rajadhyaksha, Ashish; Willemen, Paul (1998) [1994]. Encyclopaedia of Indian Cinema (PDF). British Film Institute and Oxford University Press. ISBN 0-19-563579-5. Archived (PDF) from the original on 21 August 2016.
- Rishi, Tilak (2012). Bless You Bollywood!: A Tribute to Hindi Cinema on Completing 100 Years. Trafford Publishing. ISBN 978-1-4669-3963-9. Archived from the original on 24 December 2023.
- Somaaya, Bhawana (2016). Once Upon a Time in India: A Century of Indian Cinema. Random House India. ISBN 978-9-3859-9040-3. Archived from the original on 24 December 2023.
