= Ek Ladki Ko Dekha Toh Aisa Laga =

2019 Indian film by Shelly Chopra Dhar

- Theatrical release poster
- Directed by: Shelly Chopra Dhar
- Screenplay by: Gazal Dhaliwal; Shelly Chopra Dhar
- Produced by: Vidhu Vinod Chopra
- Starring: Anil Kapoor; Sonam Kapoor; Rajkummar Rao; Juhi Chawla; Regena Cassandrra; Akshay Oberoi
- Cinematography: Himman Dhamija
- Edited by: Ashish Suryavanshi
- Music by: Rochak Kohli
- Production company: Vinod Chopra Films
- Distributed by: Fox Star Studios
- Release date: 1 February 2019
- Running time: 120 minutes
- Country: India
- Language: Hindi
- Budget: ₹300 million
- Box office: est. ₹398.6 million

Ek Ladki Ko Dekha Toh Aisa Laga (transl. How I felt when I saw that girl) is a 2019 Indian Hindi-language coming-of-age romantic comedy-drama film directed by Shelly Chopra Dhar. The screenplay was written by Dhar and Gazal Dhaliwal, with the story inspired by the 1919 novel A Damsel in Distress by P. G. Wodehouse. It stars Anil Kapoor, Sonam Kapoor, Rajkummar Rao, and Juhi Chawla, alongside Abhishek Duhan, Madhumalti Kapoor, Seema Pahwa, Brijendra Kala, Alka Kaushal and Kanwaljit Singh in supporting roles with Regena Cassandrra appears in an extended cameo role and Akshay Oberoi makes a special appearance in the film. The film tells the story of Sweety Chaudhary, a closeted lesbian, and her attempts to come out to her conservative and traditional Punjabi family. (Note: Fire (1996) is the first mainstream Bollywood film to feature a lesbian romance.)

The film, named after a song of the same name from the 1994 film 1942: A Love Story, is the first collaboration between real-life father and daughter, Anil Kapoor and Sonam Kapoor and was the Hindi film debut of Regena Cassandrra. It was released worldwide on 1 February 2019 to positive reviews from critics, but it bombed at the box office. The screenplay was selected by the Academy of Motion Picture Arts and Sciences for its library's Core Collection.

== Plot ==
A young Punjabi woman, Sweety Chaudhary, is under pressure from her traditional family to marry. She meets a young woman named Kuhu and Kuhu's brother, Raza, at a wedding. A year passes. In Delhi, Sahil Mirza is a playwright though not very successful, and his father, a famous film producer, thinks he should give up being a playwright. Sweety sees a rehearsal of his latest play and remarks that it is amusing but the romance is superficial. A man comes chasing her, and Sahil helps her flee. She escapes while Sahil fights the man, and Sahil accidentally hits a policeman. At the police station, Sahil learns that the man is Sweety's brother Babloo, and they live in Chaudhary Manor, Moga, Punjab. Sahil wants to see Sweety again and decides to write his next play in Moga. He is joined by Chatro, a caterer and enthusiastic amateur actress.

Sweety and Babloo's single father, Balbir Chaudhary, runs Chaudhary Garments, a clothing company. He actually wanted to become a cook, but his mother Beeji insists men do not belong in the kitchen. Babloo claims that Sweety has been going to Delhi to see a Muslim boy, so she must not be allowed to leave the house. Sahil goes to the manor with a letter for her. He sees Balbir cooking. Incorrectly assuming Balbir is the cook, Sahil pays him to give the letter to Sweety. This convinces Balbir that Sahil is Sweety's Muslim boyfriend. Sahil next pays Balbir's employee Chaubey to pass along a message to Sweety, and Chaubey tells Sahil that Sweety loves him though the family disapproves of her dating him because he is Muslim. A few individuals employed by the family bet on who Sweety will marry, with the cook Billauri betting on someone from a matchmaking app. Chaubey bets on “Mr. X”, any unknown outsider. Sweety learns Sahil is holding acting classes, and goes with Beeji and Billauri to the class. Sahil and Chatro are invited to Beeji's birthday party the following day.

At Beeji's party, Chatro bonds with Balbir over cooking. He notices Sahil enjoying the party and tells the others that Sahil is Sweety's Muslim boyfriend. Chaubey hides Sahil and brings him to Sweety's room. Sahil says he loves her. She tells him Babloo lied and she is actually in love with a girl. Sahil is astonished and too drunk to properly respond. The next day, he cancels the acting class. Billauri sees Chaubey taking Sahil to Sweety's room and blackmails him into exchanging their bets. She helps Sweety see Sahil again. Sweety explains that she did not fit in as a child and now she hides the truth about herself. She is in a relationship with Kuhu. Babloo had discovered this and tried to stop it, but she continued to see Kuhu in Delhi. She is glad to have a friend to confide in, and Sahil is glad to be her friend. Sweety wants to join Kuhu in London and study art there, yet she does not want to run away from her family. Chatro tells Balbir she is divorced with kids, and feels her kids should be free to marry or not, and to marry whomever they want to, regardless of religion. This inspires Balbir to invite Sahil to dinner and announce Sweety's engagement to him, which Babloo encourages.

Sweety resolves to marry Sahil to make her family happy, though Sahil is against this. Sahil's supportive mother reminds him about a successful play he wrote that was based on a true story. He offers to write a play for Balbir's upcoming fashion show, with Balbir, Chatro, and the others as the actors. Sahil writes a romance titled Ek Ladki Ko Dekha Toh Aisa Laga, which will star Sweety and Kuhu. Balbir at first finds the story absurd, but Sahil defends it as a fresh new story. Babloo is supposed to be away but finds out about the play and reveals Sweety is actually in a relationship with Kuhu, not Sahil. Balbir leaves angrily, though Sweety declares the show will go on. As it becomes apparent the play is about a romance between two women, members of the audience start to leave, though many remain. After Balbir reads Sweety's diary and sees how she has felt lonely and misunderstood, he returns to the stage to defend Sweety and Kuhu. He is now accepting and supportive. The audience applauds. Later, Sahil's father congratulates him on his fresh new play. Sweety suggests Sahil present the play in other places for others like her. Balbir opens a restaurant and starts a relationship with Chatro. Billauri, claiming the gender of “Mr. X” is irrelevant, wins the bet on who Sweety would marry.

== Cast ==
- Anil Kapoor as Balbir Chaudhary
- Sonam K Ahuja as Sweety Chaudhary
  - Sara Arjun as 12 year old Sweety Chaudhary
  - Dilnoor as 8 year old Sweety Chaudhary
- Rajkummar Rao as Sahil Mirza
- Juhi Chawla as Chatro
- Regena Cassandrra as Kuhu (extended cameo)
- Abhishek Duhan as Babloo Chaudhary
- Madhumalti Kapoor as Beeji
- Seema Pahwa as Billauri
- Brijendra Kala as Chaubey
- Alka Kaushal as Sahil’s mother
- Kanwaljit Singh as Sahil's father
- Sandeep Kapoor as Joginder
- Akshay Oberoi as Raza (special appearance)

== Production ==
Principal photography began in Patiala on 29 January 2018. Initially, Anil Kapoor began filming and Sonam Kapoor joined the production shortly thereafter. It is produced by Vidhu Vinod Chopra under the banner of Vinod Chopra Films.

The film's title is derived from a similarly named song from the 1994 film 1942: A Love Story, which also stars Anil Kapoor. Ek Ladki Ko Dekha Toh Aisa Laga marks the reunion, after 11 years, of Anil Kapoor and Juhi Chawla, one of India's popular onscreen couples.

== Release ==
Ek Ladki Ko Dekha Toh Aisa Laga was released on 1 February 2019 on 1,500 screens in domestic circuit. The film is distributed by Fox Star Studios, and received a 12A certification from the British Board of Film Classification.

== Reception ==
=== Critical response ===
On review aggregator Rotten Tomatoes, the film has a 77% approval rating based on 13 reviews, with an average rating of 6.9/10.

Saibal Chatterjee of NDTV gave it four stars out of five and wrote, "In the context of a commercial filmmaking tradition that has usually been appallingly uncaring of LGBTQ sensibilities, Ek Ladki Ko Dekha... is a whiff of fresh air, a huge leap forward from 2008's Dostana. It does not seek to derive mirth and frivolity from the theme, offering instead an earnest, unapologetic depiction of the act of coming out in a conservative society." He found the story "simple enough and is told in a manner that could be faulted for being overly chaste — the same-sex lovers embrace a few times but they do not as much as plant a kiss on each other's cheeks, let alone lips — but the film achieves something far bigger than a Bollywood crowd-pleaser can....[It]...goads the audience to think differently without trying to deviate from its primary purpose, which is to deliver entertainment."

Gaurang Chauhan of Times Now rated the film three and a half stars out of five, and although he faulted the comedic conflict of Sweety being mistaken by her family as "in love with a 'musalmaan'", he concluded that "Overall, Ek Ladki Ko Dekha Toh Aisa Laga is an important, well-intended film that is high on entertainment, boasts of great performances and rightfully deserves all the applause."

Ananya Bhattacharya of India Today gave it four stars out of five, opining, "Ek Ladki Ko Dekha Toh Aisa Laga sets out to smash our ideas of right and wrong....It is an important film for the times we live in....Sonam Kapoor and Anil Kapoor, along with writer Gazal Dhaliwal and director Shelly Chopra Dhar, deliver a brilliant lesbian love story that Bollywood should be proud of."

Film critic Taran Adarsh gave the film three stars out of five, and said it was "brave" and "will surely trigger debates about love and life...."

=== Box office ===
Ek Ladki Ko Dekha Toh Aisa Laga collected ₹2.90 crore on the first day of release. The first week earned ₹17.19 crore in domestic circuit. The film grossed ₹26 crore in the domestic market and ₹13.86 crore in the overseas market, for a combined worldwide gross of ₹39.86 crore. Box Office Mojo reported a total US$3.3 million (est.) worldwide gross as of 24 February 2019. It emerged as a box office failure.

== Home media ==
The film became available as VOD on Netflix on 2 April 2019.

== Soundtrack ==
Ek Ladki Ko Dekha Toh Aisa Laga

Soundtrack album by Rochak Kohli
- Released: 8 January 2019
- Recorded: 2018
- Genre: Feature Film Soundtrack
- Length: 17:49
- Language: Hindi
- Label: Saregama
External audio
- Audio Jukebox on YouTube

Rochak Kohli chronology
Why Cheat India (2019)	Ek Ladki Ko Dekha Toh Aisa Laga (2019)	De De Pyaar De (2019)

The music for the film was composed by Rochak Kohli, while the music of the title song was originally written by R.D. Burman for the film 1942: A Love Story, and the lyrics rewritten by Gurpreet Saini. The soundtrack album was released by Saregama on 8 January 2019.

Track listing
No.	Title	Music	Singer(s)	Length
1.	"Ek Ladki Ko Dekha Toh Aisa Laga"	Original Music: R.D. Burman; Recreated By: Rochak Kohli	Rochak Kohli, Darshan Raval	2:35
2.	"Gud Naal Ishq Mitha"	Rochak Kohli	Harshdeep Kaur, Navraj Hans	3:39
3.	"Good Morning"	Rochak Kohli	Vishal Dadlani, Shannon Donald	3:21
4.	"Chitthiye"		Kanwar Grewal	5:22
5.	"House Party Song"		Sukhwinder Singh, Arjun Kanungo, Parry G	2:52
Total length:				17:49

== See also ==
- Fire (1996)
- The Journey (2004)
- Homosexuality in India
