= Bhusal =

Nepalese Bahun-Chhetri family name

Bhusal or Bhushal (Nepali: भुसाल) is a surname belonging to the Khas people of Bahun caste from Nepal.

Notable people with the surname Bhusal include:

- Beduram Bhusal, Nepalese politician
- Deepak Bhusal, footballer from Nepal
- Ghanashyam Bhusal, Nepali politician
- Lalit Bhusal, British filmmaker of Nepalese descent
- Pampha Bhusal, Nepali politician
- Pushpa Bhusal Gautam, Nepali politician
- Manohari Singh Bhusal, Indian musician of Nepalese origin.
