= Agni Chopra =

American cricketer (born 1998)

Personal information
- Full name: Agni Dev Chopra
- Born: 4 November 1998 (age 28); Detroit, Michigan, US
- Batting: Left-handed
- Bowling: Right arm off break
- Role: Batsman
- Relatives: Vidhu Vinod Chopra (father); Anupama Chopra (mother); Zuni Chopra (sister); Kamna Chandra (maternal grandmother); Vikram Chandra (maternal uncle); Tanuja Chandra (maternal aunt); Ramanand Sagar (paternal uncle)

Domestic team information
- Years: Team
- 2023–2025: Mizoram
- 2025–present: MI New York
- FC debut: 5 January 2024 Mizoram v Sikkim
- LA debut: 3 November 2023 Mizoram v Chandigarh

Career statistics
Competition	FC	LA	T20
Matches	11	7	7
Runs scored	1804	174	234
Batting average	94.94	24.85	33.42
100s/50s	9/5	0/1	0/2
Top score	238*	50	94
Catches/stumpings	7/–	3/–	2/–
- Source: CricInfo, 1 February 2024

Agni Dev Chopra (born 4 November 1998) is an American cricketer who plays for Mizoram cricket team. He is a left-handed batsman and right arm off break bowler.

== Career ==
He represented Mumbai cricket team at Under-19 level, where he was captain, before moving to their Under-23 team, when it was suggested he get additional playing time elsewhere. He made his first class debut for Mizoram cricket team against Sikkim cricket team and made 166. Playing for Mizoram he struck five centuries in his first four matches in the Ranji Trophy, in January 2024, at an average of 95.87, with a strike rate of 111.80. With this, he became the first batter in the world to score centuries in his first four first-class games. He also played 7 matches for Mizoram in the Syed Mushtaq Ali Trophy, and scored 234 runs at a strike rate of 150.96.

Though he had an aspiring career, he had to leave his Indian cricket career to seek new teams as BCCI bars non-passport holders from domestic cricket. So he left Indian Cricket circuit, and qualified as a domestic player in the Major League Cricket (MLC) due to his USA citizenship acquired by his birth in Detroit, Michigan.

He has been picked by the MI New York as their first pick in the domestic players draft for a sum of $50,000.

== Personal life ==
He is the son of filmmaker Vidhu Vinod Chopra and film critic Anupama Chopra.
