= Qarib Qarib Singlle =

2017 film directed by Tanuja Chandra

- Theatrical release poster
- Directed by: Tanuja Chandra
- Written by: Tanuja Chandra; Gazal Dhaliwal; Ramashrit Joshi
- Story by: Kamna Chandra
- Produced by: Zee Studios; Sutapa Sikdar; Shailja Kejriwal; Ajay G. Rai
- Starring: Irrfan Khan; Parvathy Thiruvothu
- Cinematography: Eeshit Narain
- Edited by: Chandan Arora
- Music by: Score: Benedict Taylor; Naren Chandavarkar; Songs; Anu Malik; Rochak Kohli; Vishal Mishra
- Production companies: Zee Studios; JAR Pictures
- Distributed by: Zee Studios
- Release date: 10 November 2017
- Running time: 125 minutes
- Country: India
- Language: Hindi
- Box office: ₹24.11 million

Qarib Qarib Singlle (transl. Almost single) is a 2017 Indian Hindi-language romantic comedy film co-written and directed by Tanuja Chandra and produced by Zee Studios, JAR Pictures and Sutapa Sikdar. The film stars Irrfan Khan and Parvathy Thiruvothu in the lead roles and Neha Dhupia in cameo role. The film was released worldwide on 10 November 2017.

== Plot ==
Jaya Shashidharan is a 35-year-old widow leading a monotonous life, still grieving the loss of her husband Manav. She works in an insurance firm, and tired of being needled constantly by her friends and family, she creates a profile on a dating website and eventually fixes a date with a man with a decent profile, Yogendra "Yogi" Kumar Devendra Nath Prajapati, a lesser known poet and a happy-go-lucky person. He helps Jaya get rid of the people sending her weird messages on the dating site. Although initially Jaya wants to avoid Yogi, she agrees to meet him again. During their conversation he tells her about his past 3 girlfriends who still yearn for him. Jaya challenges him to meet them to find out whether that is in fact the truth. Yogi asks Jaya if she will accompany him on this quest. She reluctantly accepts, ready to pose as his 'cousin' if someone asks.

They head to Dehradun first. Yogi misses the flight, frightening Jaya. He meets her eventually at the airport and they commence their journey. On the way he asks for some water but she refuses, saying she doesn't share her bottle.

Jaya has booked their stay in an Ashram. At night they have a telephonic conversation from their adjoining rooms and Yogi falls asleep instantly to a restless Jaya's chagrin. The next day they meet Radha, his first girlfriend who is now happily married. Jaya is surprised when Yogi is addressed as a maternal uncle to Radha's kids. After the awkward encounter they board the Fairy Queen train and head to Jaipur. Yogi, in search of pakoras, misses the train, again scaring Jaya. Initially Jaya decides to abort her trip due to Yogi's whimsical ways. But he explains to her that their ways of looking at and leading life are simply different, but that's all. Jaya relents and on their way to meet Anjali, Yogi's second girlfriend, buys "sleeping pills" from a medical store. She gobbles down 3–4 pills to shut the inquisitive Yogi. She soon goes under influence of the sedatives and begins to act funny.

Yogi's ex-girlfriend Anjali meets them. It is revealed that she abandoned her anniversary party to make it to the meeting. Yogi walks Anjali back to her home, she hugs and gives him a peck. An inebriated Jaya sees this and rants at Yogi, calling him a cheat, hints of her developing feelings for him starting to show. Finally exhausted, she crashes on him and falls asleep under the starry sky.

Next morning the duo head to Gangtok, to meet his third girlfriend. A still seething Jaya reveals that she has accompanied Yogi only so that she could meet her ex-boyfriend from college, now a very famous industrialist in the city. This revelation upsets Yogi. At the hotel Jaya puts on a beautiful saree and waits for her ex-boyfriend at a café, while Yogi books his return ticket and prepares to leave. Jaya meets her ex-boyfriend and they spend some lovely time together at his home. Yogi goes to see his third girlfriend who is a dance teacher. From the window he watches her dance lessons in progress. He leaves a note at her doorstep, which salutes her for her victories and then silently goes away. Back at the hotel he packs his bags and goes to Jaya's room when he finds her laptop. She has created a webpage of Yogi's poems. Realizing his feelings for Jaya, Yogi runs out. He gets into a ropeway car while searching for Jaya. Their paths cross and Jaya calls to him from an opposite car. An excited Yogi finally doesn't miss and makes the jump into the cable Car. The couple look at each other, smiling in a knowing way. Yogi asks her if she would share her water bottle with him, which she willingly does.

== Cast ==
- Irrfan Khan as Yogendra "Yogi" Kumar Devendra Nath Prajapati
- Parvathy Thiruvothu as Jaya Shashidharan
- Neha Dhupia as Anjali (cameo)
- Pushtiie Shakti as Radha
- Avneet Kaur as a teen girl at the clothing store
- Brijendra Kala as Hotel Receptionist
- Aman Sharma as Salil, Taxi Driver
- Isha Sharvani as Gauri
- Luke Kenny as Sidkong
- Navneet Nishan as Mrs. Saluja
- Nidhi Joshi as Meghna
- Siddharth Menon as Ashish, Jaya's Younger Brother
- Babil Khan as young man on bike at the medical store (Titles scene, uncredited)
- Anud Singh Dhaka as DJ Chintu

== Production ==
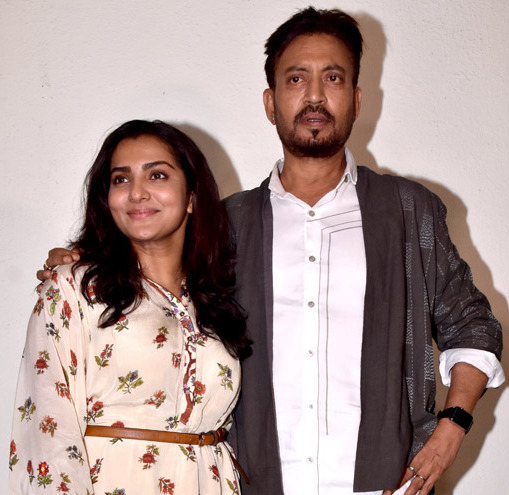
Irrfan Khan and Parvathy Thiruvothu at a special screening of Qarib Qarib Singlle.

=== Development ===
Qarib Qarib Singlle is based on a story which was originally written many years ago as a radio play by director Tanuja Chandra's mother Kamna Chandra. In August 2016, it was reported that Irrfan Khan would be the lead actor in Tanuja Chandra's next film which would be a romantic comedy about an odd couple falling in love on a road trip. The production team approached Richa Chadha, Kalki Koechlin and Pooja Hegde for the film but talks didn't materialize with any of them. While scouting for the lead actress of the film, Gazal Dhaliwal, who is the co-writer of the film, suggested the name of Parvathy Thiruvothu, an actress who was supposed to work in a Vidhu Vinod Chopra film written by Gazal Dhaliwal but could not as the film got shelved. In February 2017, it was confirmed by Parvathy Thiruvothu herself that she would be making her debut in Hindi cinema with Tanuja Chandra's film opposite Irrfan Khan.

=== Filming ===
The principal photography of the film began in February 2017 in Bikaner, Rajasthan. The film was shot across multiple locations of Dehradun, Delhi, Alwar, Bikaner, Rishikesh, Roorkee and Gangtok.

== Soundtrack ==
Qarib Qarib Singlle

Soundtrack album by Anu Malik, Rochak Kohli and Vishal Mishra
- Released: 10 November 2017
- Genre: Feature film soundtrack
- Length: 17:44
- Language: Hindi
- Label: Zee Music Company
External audio
- Audio Jukebox on YouTube

Singles from Qarib Qarib Singlle
- 1. "Khatam Kahani" Released: 13 October 2017; 2. "Tu Chale Toh" Released: 19 October 2017; 3. "Jaane De" Released: 25 October 2017

The music of the film is composed by Anu Malik, Rochak Kohli and Vishal Mishra while the lyrics have been penned by Raj Shekhar, Hussain Haidry and Varun Grover. The first song of the film titled, "Khatam Kahani" sung by Nooran Sisters, was released on 13 October 2017. The second song of the film, "Tu Chale Toh" which is sung by Papon, was released on 19 October 2017. The third single to be released was "Jaane De" which is sung by Atif Aslam was released on 25 October 2017. The soundtrack was released by Zee Music Company on 10 November 2017.

Track listing
No.	Title	Lyrics	Music	Singer(s)	Length
1.	"Khatam Kahani"	Raj Shekhar	Vishal Mishra	Nooran Sisters, Vishal Mishra	03:35
2.	"Tu Chale Toh"	Hussain Haidry	Rochak Kohli	Papon	03:34
3.	"Jaane De"	Raj Shekhar	Vishal Mishra	Atif Aslam	04:59
4.	"Tanha Begum"	Hussain Haidry	Rochak Kohli	Antara Mitra, Neeti Mohan, Rochak Kohli	03:33
5.	"Qarib Qarib Singlle Mashup" (Mashup by Ali Merchant)	Various Artists		Various Artists	02:03
Total length:					17:44

Promotional song – Not part of Soundtrack
No.	Title	Lyrics	Music	Singer(s)	Length
6.	"Dana Paani"	Varun Grover	Anu Malik	Papon, Mujtaba Aziz Naza, Anmol Malik, Chorus	03:56

== Critical reception ==
The film received mainly positive reviews. On review aggregator website Rotten Tomatoes, Qarib Qarib Singlle has an approval score of 86% based on 7 reviews with an average rating of 7.2 out of 10. Rajeev Masand of News18 gave the film a rating of 3 out of 5 and said that, "Yogi and Jaya won my heart, and I wouldn't have minded spending more time in their company." Neil Soans of The Times of India praised the performances of the leading actors of the film, Irrfan Khan and Parvathy and gave the film a rating of 3.5 out of 5. The critic concluded his review by saying that, "As long as you don't expect fireworks, enjoy this sweet film that will leave you smiling." Sweta Kausal of Hindustan Times was impressed with the performances of Irrfan Khan and Parvathy and said that Qarib Qarib Singlle is "A heartfelt film where Parvathy outshines a superb Irrfan". The critic gave the film a rating of 4 out of 5. Namrata Joshi of The Hindu applauded the movie as well as the acting performances of Irrfan Khan and Parvathy saying that, "QQS is a happy confluence of many things besides an absolutely entrancing, candid and un-self-conscious Khan who makes acting seem utterly easy and effortless."

Saibal Chatterjee of NDTV gave the film a rating of 3 out of 5 and said that, "Qarib Qarib Singlle might put off average film goers but if you see value in a film that breaks away from norm and derives strength from understatement rather than flashy storytelling methods, your search ends here." Shubhra Gupta of The Indian Express complimented the performance of leading actress Parvathy saying that, "Qarib Qarib Singlle's beating heart is Parvathy (the lead actor of the terrific Malayalam film Take Off). She is such a breath of fresh air, such a break from the dressed up dolls of Bollywood." About the movie the critic said that, "This Irrfan Khan starrer is a well-crafted, winsome rom-com" and gave the film a rating of 3.5 out of 5. Murtaza Ali Khan (film critic) of Huffington Post said that, "Qarib Qarib Singlle is a beautiful slice-of-life film about solitude and companionship that takes time to cast a spell on the viewers but once they are hooked there is no escape from its irresistible charm." and gave the film a rating of B+. Rachit Gupta of Filmfare gave the film a rating of 4 out of 5 and said that Qarib Qarib Singlle is "A light but spectacularly adroit romantic comedy." Stutee Ghosh of The Quint gave the film a rating of 3.5 out of 5 and said that, "The screenplay by Tanuja Chandra and Gazal Dhaliwal is a mature and sensitive meditation on life and love, but the unhurried pace at which the story unfolds might disappoint some."

== Accolades ==
Award Ceremony	Category	Recipient	Result	Ref.(s)
10th Mirchi Music Awards	Upcoming Music Composer of The Year	Vishal Mishra – "Jaane De"	Nominated	
Stardust Awards	Best Male Playback Singer	Vishal Mishra – "Khatam Kahani"	Won	
