= Kashish =

Kashish may refer to:

- Kashish Malik, Indian taekwondo athlete
- Kashish Singh, Indian model and actress
- Kashish Mumbai Queer Film Festival in India
- Kashish (serial), a 1990s Indian romantic drama television serial broadcast on Doordarshan
- Kashish, a 1988 album by Indian singer Asha Bhosle
