= Wazir (film) =

2016 action-thriller film directed by Bejoy Nambiar

- Theatrical release poster
- Directed by: Bejoy Nambiar
- Screenplay by: Vidhu Vinod Chopra; Abhijat Joshi
- Dialogues by: Abhijit Deshpande; Gazal Dhaliwal
- Story by: Vidhu Vinod Chopra
- Produced by: Vidhu Vinod Chopra
- Starring: Amitabh Bachchan; Farhan Akhtar; Aditi Rao Hydari; Neil Nitin Mukesh; Manav Kaul
- Cinematography: Sanu Varghese
- Edited by: Vidhu Vinod Chopra; Abhijat Joshi
- Music by: Songs: Shantanu Moitra; Ankit Tiwari; Advaita; Prashant Pillai; Rochak Kohli; Gaurav Godkhindi; Score: Rohit Kulkarni
- Production company: Vinod Chopra Films
- Distributed by: Reliance Entertainment
- Release date: 8 January 2016
- Running time: 104 minutes
- Country: India
- Language: Hindi
- Budget: ₹35 crore
- Box office: ₹78.69 crore

Wazir (transl. Vizier) is a 2016 Indian Hindi-language neo-noir action thriller film directed by Bejoy Nambiar and produced by Vidhu Vinod Chopra. Written and edited by Abhijat Joshi and Chopra, the film stars Amitabh Bachchan and Farhan Akhtar alongside Aditi Rao Hydari, Manav Kaul, with Neil Nitin Mukesh as the title character and John Abraham in a special appearance. The film's dialogues and additional dialogues were written by Abhijeet Deshpande and Gazal Dhaliwal, respectively. The music was composed by Shantanu Moitra, Ankit Tiwari, Advaita, Prashant Pillai, Rochak Kohli and Gaurav Godkhindi, with the background score composed by Rohit Kulkarni. Sanu Varghese served as the film's cinematographer.

Based on an original story by Chopra, Wazir follows the story of a suspended Anti-Terrorism Squad officer who befriends a chess player who is a wheelchair user. The idea of the film came to Chopra in the 1990s and he started writing it in English with Joshi over a period of four years starting in 2000. It was supposed to be Chopra's first Hollywood film, with Dustin Hoffman playing the protagonist. However, its producer died and the film was shelved for nearly eight years. Chopra and Joshi later re-wrote the script so it could be produced as a Hindi film. Principal photography began on 28 September 2014.

Wazir was released on 8 January 2016 and mixed-to-positive reviews from critics who particularly praised the action sequences and performances of both Bachchan and Akhtar, but criticised the predictable nature of the film. The film performed well at the box-office, with approximate worldwide revenues of ₹78.69 crore (US$12 million).

Wazir – Official Action Game, an action mobile video game tie-in was released by Zapak along with the release of the film.

== Plot ==
Danish Ali, an Anti-Terrorism Squad (ATS) officer, lives with his wife Ruhana and their young daughter Noorie. During a high-speed vehicle pursuit of wanted terrorist Farooq Rameez, Danish engages in a tense shootout. Caught in the crossfire, Noorie is fatally struck, while Rameez slips away into the chaos. Devastated by the tragedy, a grief-stricken Ruhana blames Danish's reckless choices for their daughter’s death, fracturing their marriage. Danish later tracks down Rameez in a tactical police raid and, driven by raw vengeance, executes him on the spot despite strict commands to take the operative alive, resulting in Danish’s immediate suspension from the force.

Consumed by guilt and contemplating suicide at Noorie’s gravesite, Danish crosses paths with Pandit Omkar Nath Dhar, a wheelchair-bound chess grandmaster who had previously taught Noorie the game. Sensing Danish’s agony, Pandit invites him into his home, bonding over games of chess while revealing his own profound loss. Pandit's daughter, Nina, recently died after supposedly falling down a flight of stairs at the residence of influential government minister Yazaad Qureshi, where Nina had served as a tutor to Qureshi’s young mute daughter, Ruhi. Convinced that Nina’s death was a cold-blooded murder to cover up a darker secret, Pandit implores Danish to uncover the truth, though the police quickly shut down the inquiry under political pressure. Soon after, Pandit begins receiving violent threats from a shadowy, blade-wielding assassin who refers to himself only as "Wazir."

The vendetta escalates when Wazir orchestrates a lethal attack on Pandit’s vehicle, seemingly obliterating the chess master in a violent explosion right before Danish’s eyes. Shattered yet fueled by a newfound sense of purpose, Danish follows the trail north to Jammu and Kashmir, where Qureshi is staging a high-profile political rally. Enlisting the aid of local Superintendent Vijay Malik, Danish breaches security, exposes the minister's public address, and corners the inner circle. In a private confrontation, young Ruhi uses sign language to convey the horrifying reality: Qureshi is not her biological father, but a ruthless militant who slaughtered her entire village and appropriated the minister's identity for state-level sabotage. Nina had inadvertently stumbled upon this deception, prompting Qureshi to throw her to her death. A brutal physical struggle ensues, culminating in Danish killing Qureshi before Indian authorities publicly unmask the deceased politician as an undercover terrorist leader.

Sometime later, while reflecting on the sequence of events, Danish discovers a pre-recorded video tape left behind by Pandit. The message uncovers the ultimate gambit: Wazir never existed as an independent killer, but was an elaborate persona invented by Pandit himself using prosthetics, voice modulation, and stagecraft. Paralyzed and powerless to challenge a shielded political heavyweight through conventional means, Pandit had identified Danish's lethal training and deep grief, orchestrating their bond, engineering the escalating threats, and willingly sacrificing his life in the staged explosion to unleash Danish as an unstoppable piece on his board. Entreating Danish and Ruhana to shed the shackles of their mourning, Pandit’s final confession brings peace to the fractured family, allowing the estranged couple to reconcile.

== Cast ==
- Amitabh Bachchan as Pandit Omkar Nath Dhar, a paralyzed chess instructor and Nina's father
- Farhan Akhtar as Daanish Ali, Ruhana's husband
- Aditi Rao Hydari as Ruhana Ali, Daanish's wife
- Manav Kaul as Yazaad Qureshi
- Neil Nitin Mukesh as Wazir
- Saachi Tiwari as Noorie Ali, Daanish & Ruhana's daughter
- John Abraham as SP Vijay Mallik (special appearance)
- Nasir Khan as Rameez
- Prakash Belawadi as Deputy commissioner of police
- Vaidehi Parashurami as Nina Dhar, Daughter of Pandit Omkar Nath Dhar
- Anjum Sharma as Sartaj Singh, Daanish's colleague
- Murali Sharma as Mahesh
- Nishigandha Wad as Ruhana's mother
- Seema Bhargava as Pammi, the Pandit's housekeeper
- Avtar Gill as G.B. Singh, police commissioner
- Mazel Vyas as Ruhi
- Gargi Patel as Ruhi's minder
- Reem Shaikh (special appearance)

== Production ==
=== Development ===
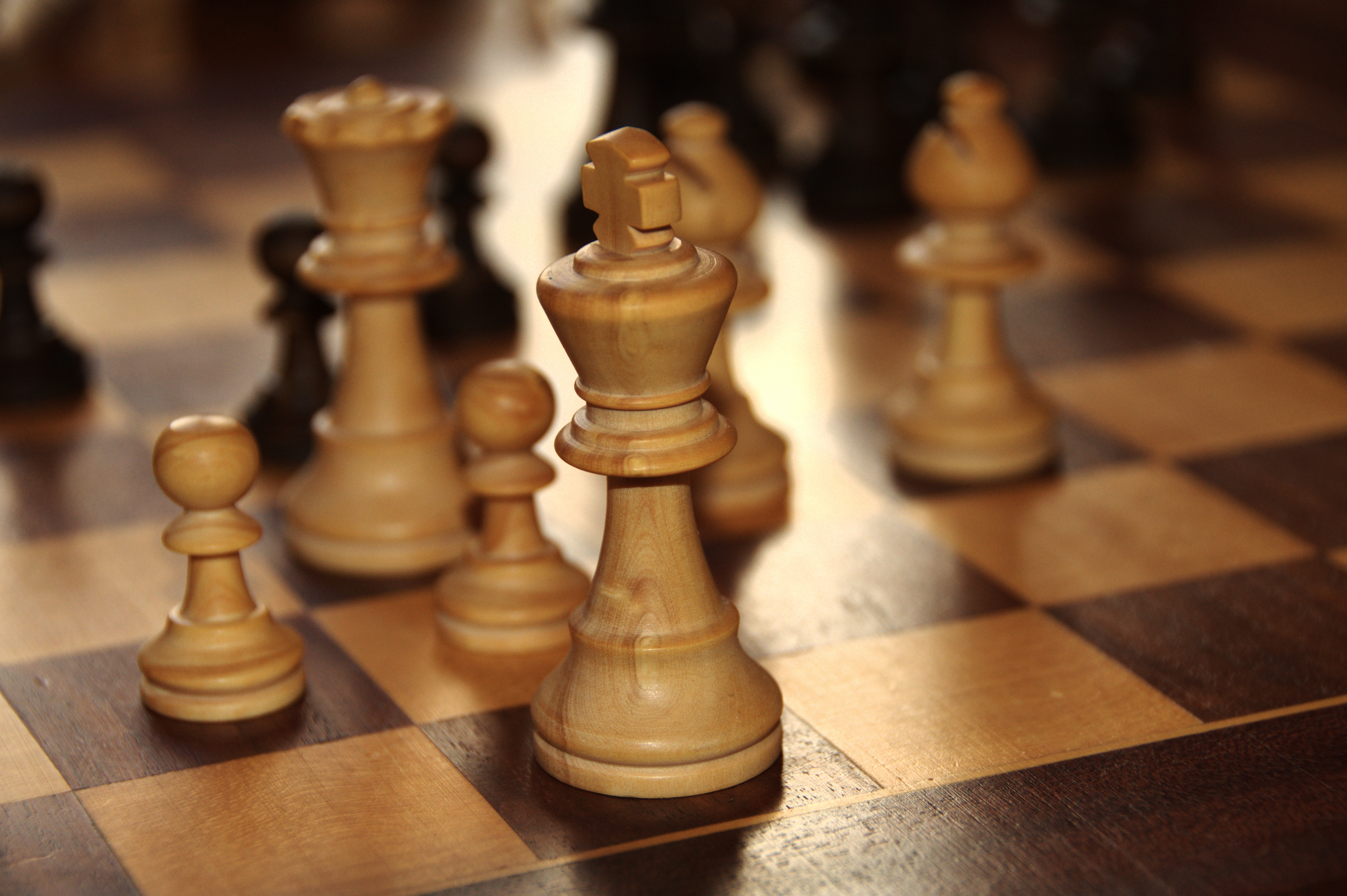
The film uses the game of chess as a metaphor.

The idea of Wazir came to Vidhu Vinod Chopra after badminton player Syed Modi was murdered on 28 July 1988 in Lucknow. However, Chopra has said that the film is completely different from the incident. When Chopra met his eventual co-writer Abhijat Joshi in 1994, he told him about the idea of setting a thriller around two chess players. Chopra described the two characters as "Rakesh Maria and Viswanathan Anand playing chess". The script was later written by them in four years, between 2000 and 2004. It was supposed to be Chopra's first Hollywood film, with Dustin Hoffman playing the protagonist. In 2005, their producer Robert Newmyer suddenly died and the script was shelved.

Chopra saw Bejoy Nambiar's 2013 film, David; he was particularly impressed by the black-and-white portions of it. Chopra subsequently called Nambiar and expressed a desire to work with the director; Chopra had a cache of unfilmed scripts, and Nambiar selected the chess one. Chopra and Joshi then spent two years writing a Hindi version of it.

Both Chopra and Joshi consulted chess experts from America for the film. The cinematography of the film was done by Sanu Varghese, who had previously worked with Nambiar on David. The film's story was tweaked constantly during its seven-month editing period; both writers also served as editors. This was the first time since his 1989 picture Parinda that Chopra had edited a film. Joshi, who edited for the first time on Wazir, believes that "a film is rewritten on the editing table". Visual effects were used to hide Bachchan's legs, to make them look as if they ended below the knees. The makers of the film went through 40 to 50 wheelchairs to find one that would be comfortable for Bachchan over the long shoot. The working titles of the film were Do and Ek Aur Ek Do, and it received its final title, Wazir, in October 2014, based on the character of that name in the film.

=== Casting ===
At the screening of Lakshya (2004), Chopra informed Farhan Akhtar about the script of Wazir, and wanted his feedback on it. Ten years later, in 2014, they met again, and Akhtar agreed to do the film because, as he later said, the revised script "moved me to my core". He went through intense training and put on eight kilograms of weight to play the role of an Anti Terrorist Squad officer. He also changed his diet and met some of his friends who were ATS officers for the preparation. He modeled his character in the film on Vishwas Nangare Patil, an Inspector-general of police from Kolhapur, Maharashtra. Akhtar agreeing for the role puzzled Chopra, who recalls: "At that time, Javed Akhtar (Farhan's father) and I were engaged in a public verbal duel. When I asked Farhan what made him agree to take up the role, he said, 'The script is so good that I will bear with you'". Chopra noted that while re-writing the film in Hindi, he and Joshi "realised the protagonist can't be American. We had to bring in our own sensibilities. Our cinema is more flamboyant. So the protagonist needed to be flamboyant too. We thought of making the chess master an Indian and approached [Amitabh] Bachchan for it". Bachchan had read the original script, and remembered it when Chopra came to him. Aditi Rao Hydari was cast after Nambiar saw her pictures when she had walked the ramp for a designer and Chopra saw her dancing. After this, she went through three set of auditions: dance, acting and a screen test. John Abraham and Neil Nitin Mukesh make extended cameo appearances in the film.

=== Filming ===
Principal photography commenced on 28 September 2014 in Mumbai. Parts of the film were also shot in Delhi. Chopra stated, "Some of the best lines in Wazir were improvised" on set, including a joke about Russian vodka and Russian girls between Bachchan and Akhtar. Akhtar did his own stunts in the film. He completed his schedule in March 2015 at Srinagar, while Bachchan filmed his remaining scenes the following month.

=== Visual effects ===
Amitabh Bachchan's legs were removed below the knee in the film with the use of visual effects to show him handicapped. He wore black socks with marks on them during filming to aid in the eventual creation of the effects. Chopra was not happy with the initial effects work on the legs, so he had changes made to improve the results.

== Soundtrack ==
The film's soundtrack album was composed by Shantanu Moitra, Ankit Tiwari, Advaita, Prashant Pillai, Rochak Kohli and Gaurav Godkhindi. The background score was composed by Rohit Kulkarni while the lyrics were written by Vidhu Vinod Chopra, Swanand Kirkire, A. M. Turaz, Manoj Muntashir and Abhijeet Deshpande. The album rights of the film were acquired by T-Series, and it was released on 18 December 2015.

== Release ==
Wazir was initially scheduled to be released in mid-2015, with the first teaser of the film attached with PK (2014). Its scheduled release date was postponed to 2 October and 4 December 2015, but it was ultimately released in India and worldwide on 8 January 2016. The film was given a "UA" certificate with no cuts by the Central Board of Film Certification. The first poster of the film was released on 15 November 2015 via Bachchan's and Akhtar's Twitter accounts, each unveiling the other's look from the film. The official trailer of the film was released on 18 November. Chopra showed the complete film to as many as 70 Indian film programmers and distributors.

In pre-release publicity, Nambiar said, "Casting Mr. Bachchan, who has got such a strong persona, and limiting him in a wheelchair, was a big task for us to get used to". This remark was condemned as "disparaging and extremely condescending" by Javed Abidi, the founder of the Disability Rights Group. Bejoy subsequently apologised for hurting anyone's feelings. The film was released on DVD on 25 March 2016 and is also available on Netflix.

== Reception ==
=== Critical reception ===
The film received mixed to positive reviews from critics who particularly praised the action sequences and the performances of both Bachchan and Akhtar, but criticised the predictable nature of the film. Subhash K. Jha gave it 4/5 stars, highlighted its "deviously clever script" and added, "In its 1 hour and 40 minutes of playing-time Wazir gives us no time to stop and ruminate.". Srijana Mitra Das of The Times of India gave it 3.5/5 stars and opened with, "So, Wazir is a smart movie – which could have been way smarter". Sweta Kaushal of Hindustan Times, in a 3/5 review, wrote that "apart from the smart storyline, powerful performances are the backbone of Wazir", and commended both the lead and supporting actors. Rachit Gupta of Filmfare, in a 3/5 star review, was also unhappy with the film's predictability: "If you pay enough attention to the first half, you'll instantly guess how the end will pan out. So you're sitting in a thriller knowing what's coming up." Gupta added that the climax was convenient and "inane". Ananya Bhattacharya of India Today gave it 3/5 stars and felt that the film had a "taut, gripping narrative" until the interval but "stumble[d]" in its second half.

The Indian Express gave the film 2.5/5 stars and wrote: "watching Farhan Akhtar and Amitabh Bachchan joust and manoeuver around each other is this film's high point". According to Rajeev Masand of News18 in a 2.5/5 star review, the film was "a consistently watchable but frankly far-fetched thriller that just isn't as smart as it ought to have been". Baradwaj Rangan characterized the film as "a decent relationship drama, a silly thriller". Shubhra Shetty Saha of Mid-Day praised Bachchan's "amazing emotional precision" and said his performance was "the best thing about this film". However, he also decried the film's "lack of subtlety" and ended with "Wazir is a good, one-time watch."

Raja Sen of Rediff.com gave the film 2/5 stars and characterized it as "obvious"; he said that "none of the character motives in this film actually add up". Saibal Chatterjee from NDTV wrote that "Wazir puts all its crucial cards on the table far too quickly, robbing itself of the shock factor that would have made all the difference between edge-of-the-seat suspense and tame by-the-numbers thrills." Namrata Joshi of The Hindu called the film "lacklustre": "Despite starting off promisingly with slick production values and good performances to boot Wazir unravels badly, especially in the second half as it heads towards the climax."

Among overseas reviewers, The Guardian's Mike McCahill gave the film 3/5 stars, and described it as "a finely poised Bollywood policier". Abhinav Purohit of The National in Abu Dhabi also gave it 3/5 stars, and wrote that "overall, Wazir is sure to resonate well with the viewers".

=== Box office ===
Wazir was the first Hindi film of the year. It earned a total of ₹55.7 million (US$580,000) on 8 January 2016, the opening day of its release at the domestic box office, much of it from the Mumbai, Pune, Delhi NCR and Uttar Pradesh circuits. The film had a moderate opening at the overseas box office on its first day, and collected ₹40 million (US$420,000).

Domestic revenues increased for each of the next two days of the film's opening weekend. On its second day the film earned ₹70 million (US$730,000), and collected ₹82.4 million (US$860,000) on its third, for an opening weekend total of ₹210 million (US$2.2 million). Daily international revenues declined as the weekend progressed, with total overseas collections rising to Rs ₹73.6 million (US$760,000) after two days, and ₹105 million (US$1.1 million) after three.

Wazir earned ₹301 million (US$3.1 million) at the domestic box office in its opening week, and ₹142 million (US$1.5 million) in the overseas market, for a one-week total of ₹443 million (US$4.6 million). The film recovered its production budget of ₹350 million (US$3.6 million) in that first week. Wazir collected ₹62.9 million (US$650,000) in domestic revenues in its second weekend, eventually becoming the first hit of 2016 at the Hindi film box office. By the end of its five-week theatrical run, the film had grossed an estimated ₹586 million (US$6.1 million) domestically and ₹201 million (US$2.1 million) internationally, for an approximate worldwide total of ₹787 million (US$8.2 million).
