= 1942: A Love Story =

1994 film by Vidhu Vinod Chopra

- Film poster
- Directed by: Vidhu Vinod Chopra
- Written by: Screenplay: Sanjay Leela Bhansali; Shiv Kumar Subramaniam; Vidhu Vinod Chopra; Dialogues: Kamna Chandra
- Story by: Kamna Chandra; Shiv Kumar Subramaniam; Vidhu Vinod Chopra
- Produced by: Vidhu Vinod Chopra
- Starring: Anil Kapoor; Manisha Koirala; Jackie Shroff; Danny Denzongpa; Anupam Kher; Chandni; Pran
- Cinematography: Binod Pradhan
- Edited by: Renu Saluja
- Music by: Songs: R. D. Burman; Score: Manohari Singh; Babloo Chakravorty
- Distributed by: SLB Films; Vinod Chopra Productions
- Release date: 15 July 1994
- Running time: 157 minutes
- Country: India
- Language: Hindi
- Budget: ₹4.75 crore
- Box office: ₹11.48 crore

1942: A Love Story, also known as 1942 A Love Story, is a 1994 Indian Hindi-language romantic drama film, directed by Vidhu Vinod Chopra. It stars Anil Kapoor, Manisha Koirala and Jackie Shroff, with Danny Denzongpa, Anupam Kher, Pran and Brian Glover. The film revolves around lovers Naren (Kapoor) and Rajjo (Koirala), who come from contrasting family backgrounds and depicts how their relationship is threatened owing to the outbreak of the Indian revolutionary movement.

The film's core plot was reported to be inspired by the 1992 Kannada-language film Mysore Mallige, which itself was based on the 1942 work of same title by K. S. Narasimhaswamy. The screenplay was jointly written by Sanjay Leela Bhansali, Kamna Chandra and Chopra. Binod Pradhan acted as the cinematographer while Renu Saluja edited the film. This was the last film work of R. D. Burman, who died before the release of the film. Upon release, the film did not perform well commercially.

== Plot ==
The film is set in 1942, when the British Raj was declining in power. It was a time when many Indian citizens were either working for the British regime or rallying in underground meetings and protests against them. In this atmosphere, Narendra Singh falls in love with Rajeshwari Pathak. Their romance is shown to develop in spite of the political and social unrest at the time.

Narendra's father, Diwan Hari Pratap Singh, is a loyal British employee working for the brutal British General Douglas, who is infamous for tracking down and executing citizens who are believed to be revolutionaries. Rajeshwari's father, Raghuveer Pathak, is a revolutionary fighting against British rule, as he holds a grudge against Douglas for murdering his son. When Narendra asks Raghuveer for Rajeshwari's hand in marriage, Raghuveer becomes livid. However, Narendra declares that he is willing to sacrifice everything for Rajeshwari and convinces Raghuveer of his love for her. Raghuveer relents but tells Narendra to talk to his father first. When Narendra does so, Hari is angry that his son has chosen the daughter of a revolutionary, but he pretends that he will do anything for Narendra's happiness.

However, Hari tricks Narendra into revealing Raghuveer's secret location and leaks the information to Major Bisht and the British authorities. Soon, police barge into Raghuveer's hideaway and try to kill him, only to find him waiting to light a bomb, killing both himself and the men. Rajeshwari, who was out at that time, realizes what has happened and runs away. She is taken into refuge by Shubhankar, a compatriot of Raghuveer who has learned of his death. Under Shubhankar's tutelage, Rajeshwari follows her father's revolutionary path. Meanwhile, Narendra gets furious at his father for using him to kill Raghuveer and drive Rajeshwari away. Promising to make up to Rajeshwari and help her cause, Narendra pledges to become a revolutionary by severing all ties with his father; even Bisht's daughter Chanda does the same after witnessing Bisht murdering her teacher Abid Ali Baig, who is a revolutionary allied with Shubhankar, much to Bisht's remorse.

To prove his point, Narendra attempts to murder Douglas in front of the city but is caught in the act after shooting down a few soldiers. Narendra is then convicted and sentenced to hang for attempted murder. Douglas then orders his troops to fire at the town square, resulting in the deaths of several citizens, including Chanda. However, Shubhankar saves Narendra from being hanged, and Bisht develops a change of heart after witnessing Chanda's death, helping Shubhankar and Narendra finish off Hari and the remaining loyalists and stabbing Douglas with a flagpole. With the loyalists dead, Narendra reconciles with Rajeshwari while Shubhankar hangs Douglas to death, avenging all those who perished under Douglas' wrath. The film ends with Narendra, Rajeshwari, Shubhankar, Bisht, and the surviving citizens hoisting and saluting the Indian flag.

== Cast ==
- Anil Kapoor as Narendra Singh "Naren", Rajjo’s love interest
- Jackie Shroff as Shubhankar, Pathak’s accomplice, secretly had a crush on Rajjo
- Manisha Koirala as Rajeshwari Pathak "Rajjo"
- Danny Denzongpa as Major Bisht, Chanda’s Father
- Chandni as Chanda Bisht, Naren’s drama partner who secretly likes Naren
- Anupam Kher as Raghuveer Pathak, Rajjo’s father
- Pran as Abid Ali Baig, Chanda’s, Rajjo’s and Naren’s drama teacher, Pathak’s accomplice in plotting General’s murder
- Ashish Vidyarthi as Ashutosh Pathak, Rajjo’s brother
- Raghuveer Yadav as Munna, Naren’s Driver and Rajjo’s neighbour
- Sushma Seth as Gayatri Singh, Naren’s Mother
- Manohar Singh as Diwan Hari Pratap Singh, Naren’s Father
- Brian Glover as General Douglas

== Production ==
=== Development ===
Vinod told me that he only makes dark films. I said I have a love story and asked him to listen to it. I read him two or three ideas and he liked one and asked me to develop it. After a year's hardship and constant quarrels and bickering, I finished the script and dialogues. Then one day Vinod called and said, 'I don't want a love story set in today's time. What if we take this story and set it in another era?'

— Chandra, about writing the script for 1942: A Love Story

Kamna Chandra, one of the scriptwriters of the film, had gone to the United States to meet her daughters Tanuja and Anupama (whom Vidhu Vinod Chopra would later marry) as they were studying there. Having watched Chopra's film Parinda on video and being impressed with it, both of them asked their mother to write a story and approach him to direct it. Chandra had previously written Prem Rog and Chandni; both were love stories. She knew Chopra made "dark films", but decided to meet him.

After returning, Chandra met Chopra at Natraj Studios. She made him listen to two or three of her ideas, among which he liked one and asked her to develop it. Chandra finished the script and dialogues by a year, until a day when Chopra himself called her and suggested that they should make a love story set in another era instead of the present time. This provoked Chandra, who could not sleep that night. However, she became excited in the next few days. Having grown up amidst the Indian freedom struggle, she decided to place the story at that time. This formed the core plot for 1942: A Love Story.

=== Casting ===
Aamir Khan had initially been offered the role of Narendra, but he declined. Anil Kapoor was then approached, who was hesitant to do the film and suggested Bobby Deol and Aamir Khan for the role. However, he was later convinced. To prepare himself for the role, Kapoor worked hard — he lost weight, cut short his hair, trimmed his moustache and worked on his costumes to create the character. Shah Rukh Khan was under consideration for the role later portrayed by Raghuvir Yadav. He did not feature as he had already been playing lead roles. Jackie Shroff, being cast as Shubankar, gave financial assistance to the film. For instance, some (extra) houses built at the film's set (which were first disapproved of by Vidhu Vinod Chopra due to the limited budget) were paid for by Shroff. Moreover, he also paid composer R. D. Burman on behalf of Chopra when he made them listen to the music of the film for the very first time.

Chopra had crafted the role of Rajeshwari Pathak in accordance to Madhuri Dixit, with lyricist Javed Akhtar also keeping her in mind while penning the lyrics for "Ek Ladki Ko Dekha To". By the time the film was launched, Dixit had packed schedules, which subsequently prevented her inclusion in the film. Manisha Koirala, who had auditioned for the role of Rajjo's sister (the role being later excluded), was then asked by Chopra to give a screen test. But, after seeing Koirala enacting a scene, Chopra deemed her a "terrible actress". Koirala, however, asked him for a second chance. She went back home, practised her lines and came back prepared the next day. She pleased Chopra with her performance and was thereafter signed. Ashwini Bhave was also one of those who had auditioned for the role. She was rejected on the spot.

Nana Patekar, who had previously worked with Chopra in Parinda (1989), was selected to portray Raghuvir Pathak. But he insisted on being cast as Shubankar, which caused a rift between him and Chopra. Anupam Kher was later signed for the role. Mithun Chakraborty had also been briefly considered for the role of Shubankar, when Shroff developed date issues. The distributors, however, somehow made Chopra retain Shroff in the film. Since the production started in the early 90s, it was speculated that Sanjay Kapoor was to replace his brother Anil as the latter's film Lamhe (1991) had not been successful. Nevertheless, it did not materialize.

=== Filming ===
Principal photography for the film, being handled by Binod Pradhan, took place mainly at various locations in Himachal Pradesh, including the district Chamba, Dalhousie, Khajjiar and the Kalatop Sanctuary to depict pre-independence India. An artificial set resembling Dalhousie was created in the Mumbai Filmcity, since it was an expensive proposition to take the entire cast and crew there. It was erected by art director Nitin Desai at a cost of ₹80 lakhs. According to Desai, many people told Chopra not to hire him, as he was a newcomer; yet Chopra had full faith in him.

== Music ==
The music composer of the film was R. D. Burman who died before the release of the film, with lyrics by Javed Akhtar. The background score was by Manohari Singh and Babloo Chakraborty. R. D. won his last Filmfare Award for Best Music Director and Javed Akthar bagged his first Filmfare Award for Best Lyricist for "Ek Ladki Ko Dekha". Kumar Sanu won his 5th consecutive and the last Filmfare Award for Best Male Playback Singer for "Ek Ladki Ko Dekha" and Kavita Krishnamurthy won the Filmfare Award for Best Female Playback Singer for "Pyar Hua Chupke Se", the first of her hat-trick feat. The soundtrack was #13 on the list of "100 Greatest Bollywood Soundtracks of All Time", as compiled by Planet Bollywood. The music in the introduction of the film is from Gustav Holst's The Planets - Mars the bringer of war. RD Burman passed away before the completion of the music of the film as a result the female version of the song Kuch na Kaho was re-recorded in the voice of Lata Mangeshkar as tribute to the late composer whereas Kavita Krishnamurthy had already provided her vocals for a copy of the song. According to Box Office India, with around 35,00,000 units sold, this film's soundtrack was the year's third highest-selling album, behind Hum Aapke Hain Koun..! and Mohra.

#	Song	Singer
1.	"Ek Ladki Ko Dekha"	Kumar Sanu
2.	"Pyar Hua Chupke Se"	Kavita Krishnamurthy
3.	"Rooth Na Jana"	Kumar Sanu
4.	"Kuchh Na Kaho" (Happy)	Kumar Sanu
5.	"Rim Jhim Rim Jhim"	Kavita Krishnamurthy, Kumar Sanu
6.	"Yeh Safar"	Shibaji Chatterjee
7.	"Kuch Na Kaho" (Sad)	Lata Mangeshkar

== Release ==
1942: A Love Story was released on 15 April 1994. It opened to positive reviews from critics, with praise drawn towards the cast performances, cinematography, and the soundtrack by R. D. Burman. Amitabh Bachchan had attended the preview screening of the film and congratulated Chopra for his endeavour The film was restored in 8K and re-released on 21 August 2026.

== Accolades ==
Award (Note: Awards, festivals and organizations are in alphabetical order.)	Date of ceremony (Note: Date is linked to the article about the awards held that year, wherever possible.)	Category	Recipient(s)	Result	Ref.
Filmfare Awards	25 February 1995	Best Film	Vidhu Vinod Chopra	Nominated	
Filmfare Awards	25 February 1995	Best Director	Vidhu Vinod Chopra	Nominated	
Filmfare Awards	25 February 1995	Best Actor	Anil Kapoor	Nominated	
Filmfare Awards	25 February 1995	Best Actress	Manisha Koirala	Nominated	
Filmfare Awards	25 February 1995	Best Supporting Actor	Jackie Shroff	Won	
Filmfare Awards	25 February 1995	Best Music Director	R. D. Burman	Won	
Filmfare Awards	25 February 1995	Best Lyricist	Javed Akhtar for "Ek Ladki Ko Dekha To"	Won	
Filmfare Awards	25 February 1995	Best Male Playback Singer	Kumar Sanu for "Ek Ladki Ko Dekha To"	Won	
Filmfare Awards	25 February 1995	Best Female Playback Singer	Kavita Krishnamurthy for "Pyaar Hua Chupke Se"	Won	
Filmfare Awards	25 February 1995	Best Cinematography	Binod Pradhan	Won	
Filmfare Awards	25 February 1995	Best Art Direction	Nitin Chandrakant Desai	Won	
Filmfare Awards	25 February 1995	Best Editing	Renu Saluja	Won	
Filmfare Awards	25 February 1995	Best Sound Design	Jitendra Chaudhary, Namita Nayak	Won	
Screen Awards	1995	Best Supporting Actor	Anupam Kher	Won	
Screen Awards	1995	Best Music Director	R. D. Burman	Won	
Screen Awards	1995	Best Lyricist	Javed Akhtar for "Ek Ladki Ko Dekha To"	Won	
Screen Awards	1995	Best Male Playback Singer	Kumar Sanu for "Ek Ladki Ko Dekha To"	Won	
Screen Awards	1995	Best Art Direction	Nitin Chandrakant Desai	Won	
Screen Awards	1995	Best Cinematography	Binod Pradhan	Won	
Screen Awards	1995	Best Sound Design	Jitendra Chaudhary, Namita Nayak	Won	
