= An Encounter with Faces =

- Directed by: Vidhu Vinod Chopra
- Produced by: K.K. Kapil
- Cinematography: S.N Mishra
- Distributed by: Films Division of India
- Release date: 1978
- Running time: 21 minutes

An Encounter with Faces is a 1978 short documentary film directed by Vidhu Vinod Chopra and produced by K.K. Kapil. It focuses on a group of children in an orphanage. It was nominated in 1979 for an Academy Award for Documentary Short Subject, for outstanding visuals and cinematography.

== Awards and nominations ==
| Year | Award | Category | Recipient(s) | Result |
|---|---|---|---|---|
| 1979 | Academy Awards | Best Documentary (Short Subject) | K.K. Kapil | Nominated |
| 1980 | Tampere Film Festival | Grand Prix | Vidhu Vinod Chopra | Won |
