= Zuni Chopra =

Indian author

- Born: c. 2001 or 2002
- Occupation: Author
- Parents: Vidhu Vinod Chopra (father); Anupama Chopra (mother)
- Relatives: Agni Chopra (brother); Kamna Chandra (maternal grandmother); Vikram Chandra (maternal uncle); Tanuja Chandra (maternal aunt); Ramanand Sagar (paternal uncle)

Zuni Chopra is an Indian author best known for her novel, The House That Spoke. She has also authored three other books. Chopra is the daughter of filmmaker Vidhu Vinod Chopra and journalist Anupama Chopra. One of her poems titled, The Mountain Range, that talked about the exam pressure on students, was well received in the Indian media. She is set to major in creative writing at Stanford University in September 2019. Zuni was shortlisted for Young Author Awards 2018.

== Writing ==
Chopra's first book of poetry The Land of Dreams, was published by Ameya Prakashan in 2011. Her second book of poetry, Painting with Words, was published by Ameya Prakashan in 2014. Both books are dedicated to her family.

Chopra's debut novel,The House That Spoke, was published in 2017 by Penguin Random House India when Chopra was 15. It is dedicated to three of her friends. The book was originally set in London, but after struggling to "breathe life" into the story, she relocated it to Kashmir.

Her second book, The Island of the Day Before, a collection of stories, flash fiction, and poetry, was published in 2018.
