= Shiv Kumar Subramaniam =

Indian actor and screenwriter (1959–2022)

- Born: 23 December 1959; Bombay, Bombay State, India
- Died: 10 April 2022 (aged 62); Mumbai, Maharashtra, India
- Education: AISSMS Shri Shivaji Preparatory Military School, Pune
- Alma mater: St. Xavier’s College
- Occupations: Actor, playwright, theatre artist, director
- Years active: 1989–2022
- Spouse: Divya Jagdale (before 2022)
- Children: 1

Shiv Kumar Subramaniam (23 December 1959 – 10 April 2022) was an Indian actor and screenwriter who is known for his role as the leading industrial tycoon I. M. Virani in the Indian television serial Mukti Bandhan on Colors channel. He is credited with writing the screenplay for the 1989 film Parinda, directed by Vidhu Vinod Chopra and for the 2005 film Hazaaron Khwaishein Aisi, directed by Sudhir Mishra. He also appeared in supporting roles in both films. He died from an illness on 10 April 2022.

== Filmography ==
=== As actor ===
- Parinda (1989)
- Prahaar (1994) as Commando Khandagle
- 1942: A Love Story (1994) as Water careier
- Droh Kaal (1995)
- Rakshak (1996)
- Bombay Boys (1999)
- Snip! (2000)
- Dead End (2000)
- Ek Din 24 Ghante (2003)
- Risk (2007) as DCP Uttam Bhandari
- Kaminey (2009) as Lobo
- Teen Patti (2010) as Mr. Bose
- Kismat (TV series) (2011)
- Stanley Ka Dabba (2011)
- That Girl in Yellow Boots (2011) as Peter
- Mukti Bandhan (television serial) (2011)
- Pradhanmantri (TV Series) as K. Kamaraj
- 24 as Kamaljit Sood
- Humne Li Hai... Shapath as Bolt (2013)
- 2 States as Shiv Swaminathan, Ananya's father (2014)
- Happy Journey as Andrew (Alice's Father) (2014)
- Rahasya (2015) as Mr. Noorani
- Ungli as DCP Shivraman (2014)
- Bangistan (2015) as The Shankaracharya
- Rocky Handsome (2016) as ACP Rebbelo
- Hichki (2018) as Principal of St.Notker's
- Laakhon Mein Ek as Mr. Morthy
- Tu Hai Mera Sunday as Appa
- The Accidental Prime Minister (2019) as P. Chidambaram
- Nail Polish (2021) as Dr. Nandi
- Meenakshi Sundareshwar (2021) as Thatha

=== As screenwriter ===
- Parinda (screenplay) (1989)
- 1942: A Love Story (story & screenplay) (1994)
- Is Raat Ki Subah Nahin (screenplay) (1996)
- Arjun Pandit (screenplay) (1999)
- Dead End (TV movie) (dialogue) (2000)
- Chameli (screenplay) (2003)
- Hazaaron Khwaishein Aisi (original story & screenplay with Sudhir Mishra & Ruchi Narain) (2005)
- Teen Patti (story, screenplay & dialogue) (2010)

=== As assistant director ===
- Parinda (1989)

== Awards ==
- Filmfare Awards
  - Filmfare Award for Best Screenplay for Parinda (1990)
  - Filmfare Award for Best Story for Hazaaron Khwaishein Aisi (2006) shared with Sudhir Mishra & Ruchi Narain
