= Tanuja Chandra =

Indian film director

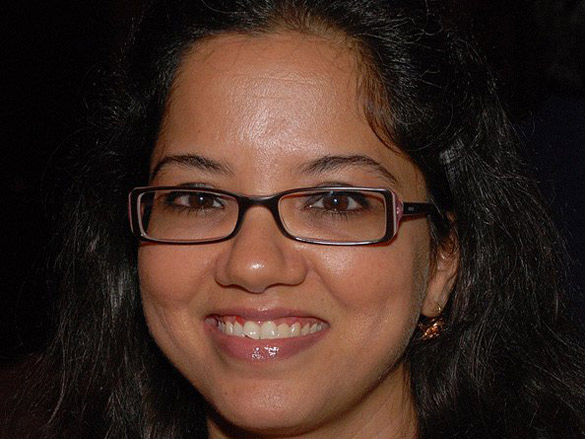
- Chandra in 2007
- Born: 1969 (age 56–57); Delhi, India
- Occupations: Film director, writer
- Mother: Kamna Chandra
- Relatives: Vikram Chandra (brother); Anupama Chopra (sister); Zuni Chopra (niece); Agni Chopra (nephew); Vidhu Vinod Chopra (brother-in-law)

Tanuja Chandra (born 1969) is an Indian film director and writer. Chandra is the daughter of writer Kamna Chandra and sister of author Vikram Chandra and film critic Anupama Chopra. She co-wrote the screenplay of Yash Chopra's Dil To Pagal Hai (1997) and is known for frequently directing women-oriented films where female characters are the main protagonists, notably Dushman (1998) and Sangharsh (1999).

== Family ==
Chandra was born in Delhi. She is the sister of the writer Vikram Chandra and film critic Anupama Chopra. Her mother is film writer Kamna Chandra.

== Career ==
Chandra began her career in 1995 and made her directorial debut with the TV series Zameen Aasmaan, starring Tanvi Azmi. In 1996, she directed another television serial along with Shabnam Sukhdev, called Mumkin. In 1997, she wrote the screenplay for Yash Chopra's Dil To Pagal Hai, which was a commercial success.

She went on to collaborate often with Mahesh Bhatt and wrote the screenplay for his film, Zakhm (1998). She also made her cinematic directorial debut with his Dushman in the same year. The movie, starring Kajol in the lead role, received critical praise and performed moderately-well at the box office.

Her next film, Sangharsh (1999), was also produced by Mahesh Bhatt and starred Akshay Kumar, Preity Zinta and Ashutosh Rana in leading roles.

Since then, Chandra has directed several films, many of which went unnoticed. Yet films like Sur – The Melody of Life (2002) and Film Star (2005), which were directed and written by Chandra, received favourable reviews from critics and praise for her work as a director and writer.

Recent films were Zindaggi Rocks (2006), starring Sushmita Sen. Chandra also wrote the story and the screenplay for the film. Her most recent film was Hope and a Little Sugar (2008), was shot entirely in English in the US. In early 2016, She directed a short film Silvat for Zee telefilms, which stars Kartik Aaryan.

Tanuja's latest released film is Qarib Qarib Singlle starring Irrfan Khan and Parvathy. She has been working on the development of a television show for Star which will begin production soon. A book titled "BIJNIS WOMEN" of short stories by her has just been published by Penguin Random House.

== Filmography ==
Year	Film	Director	Writer	Note
1997	Tamanna	No	Yes	
1997	Dil To Pagal Hai	No	Yes	
1998	Zakhm	No	Yes	
1998	Dushman	Yes	No	
1999	Sangharsh	Yes	No	
2001	Yeh Zindagi Ka Safar	Yes	No	
2002	Sur – The Melody of Life	Yes	Yes	
2005	Film Star	Yes	Yes	
2006	Zindaggi Rocks	Yes	No	
2008	Hope and a Little Sugar	Yes	Yes	
2016	Silvat	Yes	No	Short Film
2017	Qarib Qarib Singlle	Yes	Yes	
2019	A Monsoon Date	Yes	No	Short Film
2019	Aunty Sudha Aunty Radha	Yes	No	Documentary
