= Kareeb =

1998 Indian film by Vidhu Vinod Chopra

- Directed by: Vidhu Vinod Chopra
- Written by: Kamna Chandra; Abhijat Joshi
- Produced by: Vidhu Vinod Chopra; Vir Chopra
- Starring: Bobby Deol; Shabana Raza; Moushmi Chatterji
- Cinematography: Binod Pradhan
- Edited by: Renu Saluja
- Music by: Anu Malik
- Distributed by: Tips Industries
- Release date: 17 July 1998
- Country: India
- Language: Hindi
- Budget: ₹6.50 crore
- Box office: ₹12.93 crore

Kareeb (English: Close) is a 1998 Indian Hindi-language romance drama film produced, directed and co-written by Vidhu Vinod Chopra. It stars Bobby Deol and Shabana Raza.

== Plot ==
Birju Kumar is a young man from an upper-middle-class family in Himachal Pradesh. His father insists on him being responsible, while Birju is interested in petty theft, lies, and romancing a beautiful young woman named Neha. Neha is a simple, beautiful, and responsible girl from a poor family. When Birju first sees Neha, he immediately falls in love with her. Neha also starts liking Birju but hides her feelings. Birju tries everything to impress Neha and eventually she realizes how much she loves Birju and can't live without him.

Birju's father does not want Birju to marry into a poor family but Birju lies that Neha's uncle is rich and arranges their wedding. Birju steals money from his home and pretends that the money has been sent by Neha's uncle. However, on the eve of the wedding, Birju's father discovers the truth and calls off the wedding.

Neha's mother, unable to withstand this emotional distress, suffers a heart attack. When Birju meets Neha she is very distraught for her mother and anger at Birju for lying. Neha makes Birju promise that he will never show his face again. Neha then takes her mother to a Shimla hospital in an ambulance and Birju follows. Birju later spends that night sleeping on the steps of a laundry shop owned by Bhigelal. Bhigelal is an interesting character with the dream of visiting England one day and owns a collection of antique coins to sell to a diwanji. With the money earned by selling coins and operating his laundry shop, he plans to visit England just as his father dreamed of. He then hires Birju as a laundry boy. This is Birju's first job which he accepts to be near Neha and earn money to support her mother's treatment. One day after work Birju meets Uncle and Aunty. They treat Birju as their son and offer to help him whenever he needs it.

At the hospital, Birju inquires about Neha's mother and he is told by the receptionist that she needs an immediate surgery and it will be very expensive. In the next scene, Doctor Abhay first appears after Neha tries to contact Birju for help but is unable to reach him. Doctor Abhay is very fond of Neha and proposes to marry her in exchange for her mother's operation for free because doctors can provide free medical service to their relatives.

Birju goes to Uncle and Aunty who propose he buys a lottery ticket, which they will ensure he wins by bribing corrupt government officials. They ask Birju to get them some money for the bribe. Birju buys the lottery ticket as instructed and works hard all day to collect the money for the bribe. He then gives it to Uncle and Aunty but eventually realises the couple has fled with his money & had also duped many other people just like him. Helpless Birju steals the money from Bhigelal to pay for the surgery. He returns to the hospital with the money and gives it to the doctor, asking the doctor to not tell Neha.

Eventually, Birju's family realises Birju's love for Neha and decides to support their son in Shimla. They reach Simla and handle things with Bhigelal who goes mad on seeing his robbed drawer with Birju's note promising to return the money. Neha learns that Birju helped her and wants to meet him. They both meet on a staircase of the hospital and time stops again to see them deeply in love.

== Cast ==
- Bobby Deol as Brij Kumar (Birju)
- Shabana Raza as Neha
- Moushumi Chatterjee as Neha's mother
- Johnny Lever as Bighelaal
- Amit Phalke as Chandru
- Sushma Seth as Mrs. Ranbir Singh
- Saurabh Shukla as Birju's father
- Shammi Kapoor as Thakur Ranbir Singh
- Vijayendra Ghatge as Diwan Virendranath
- Abhay Chopra as Dr. Abhay

== Soundtrack ==
Kareeb

Soundtrack album by Anu Malik
- Released: 30 April 1998
- Genre: Feature film soundtrack
- Label: Tips Music

Anu Malik composed the film's music and Rahat Indori penned the lyrics. "Chura Lo Na Dil Mera" – catchy romantic duet & "Chori Chori Jab Nazrein Mili" – graceful, elegant melody praised for its minimalistic charm.

#	Title	Singer(s)
1.	"Chura Lo Na Dil Mera"	Kumar Sanu, Sanjeevani
2.	"Chori Chori Jab Nazrein Mili"	Kumar Sanu, Sanjeevani
3.	"Haan Judai Se Darta Hai Dil"	Kumar Sanu
4.	"Tum Juda Ho Kar Hamen"	Roop Kumar Rathod, Sanjeevani
5.	"Tera Gussa"	Abhijeet
6.	"Chori Chori Jab Nazrein Mili" (Part 2)	Kumar Sanu, Sanjeevani
7.	"Haan Judai Se Darta Hai Dil (Part 2)"	Sanjivani
8.	"Reet Yahi Jag Ki"	Jaspinder Narula, Sanjeevani

== Reception ==
Suparn Verma of Rediff.com wrote, "On the whole, the film works. It's much better held together than 1942…, since there are no multi-dimensions in this story. But the scenes with Johnny Lever and the extended climax could have done with a bit of chopping at the editing table."
