= Kamna Chandra =

Indian film writer

Kamna Chandra is an Indian writer who has written plays for All India Radio and stories and dialogues for the screen which include the films Chandni, 1942: A Love Story (directed by her son-in-law Vidhu Vinod Chopra), Prem Rog and the television show Kashish.

== Biography ==
Kamna hails from Muzaffarnagar and did part of her schooling from MKP College, Dehradun, after which she did her bachelor's degree from Allahabad University, and was then married to business executive Navin Chandra. She is the mother of author Vikram Chandra, film critic Anupama Chopra (who is married to filmmaker Vidhu Vinod Chopra) and film director Tanuja Chandra. Her granddaughter, through Anupama, Zuni Chopra is also a writer.

== Filmography ==
Year	Title	Credited for
1982	Prem Rog	Story
1984	Trishna	Screenplay
1989	Chandni	Story
1992	Kashish	Story
1994	1942: A Love Story	Story and dialogues
1998	Kareeb	Story and dialogues
2017	Qarib Qarib Singlle	Story and dialogues
