= Lalit Bhusal =

British Filmmaker and author

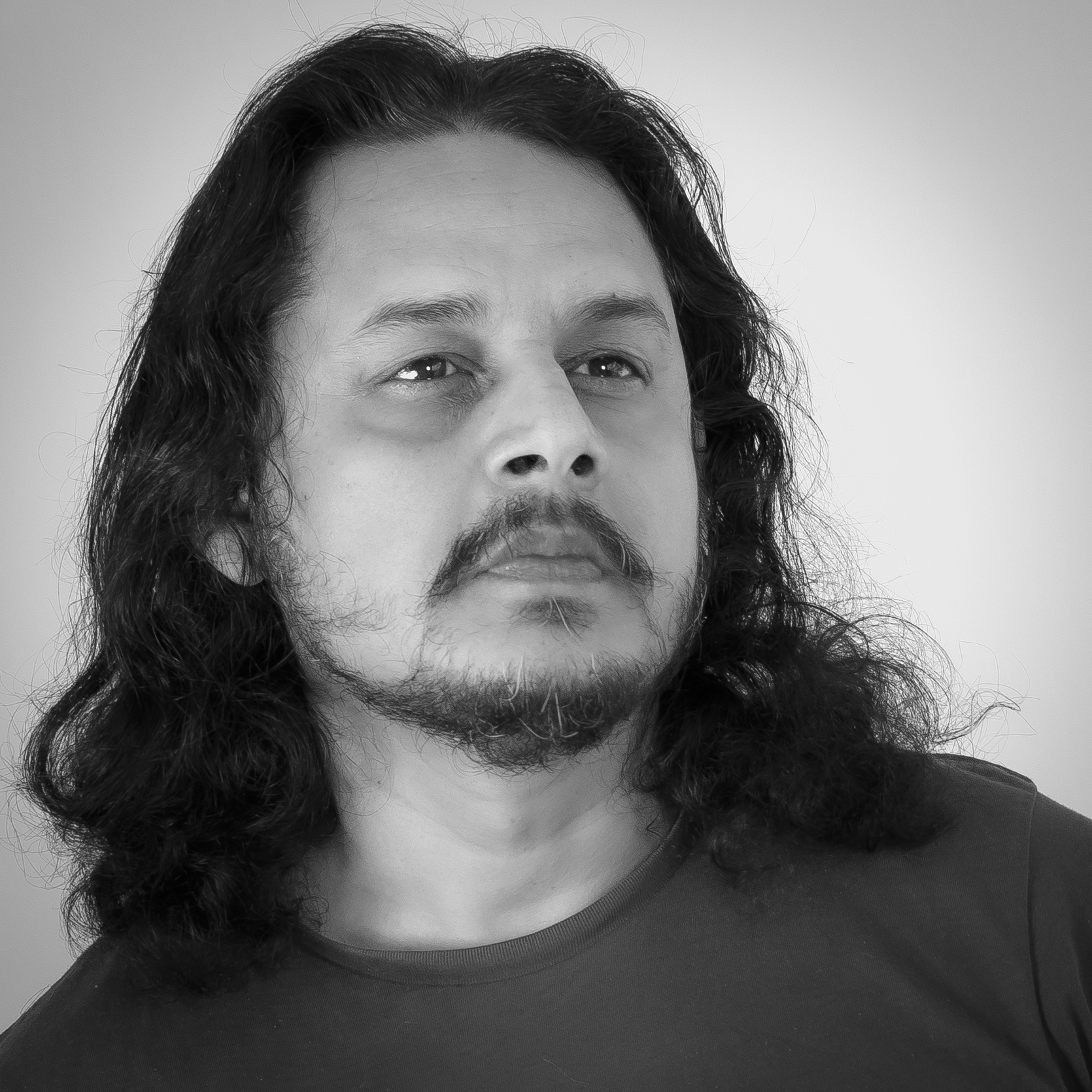
- Lalit Bhusal (ललित भूसाल)
- Born: 21 January 1975 (age 51)
- Occupations: Film director, film producer, screenwriter, actor, filmfestival director and author.
- Website: lalitbhusal.com

Lalit Bhusal (Devanagari: ललित भुषाल; born 21 January 1975) is a British filmmaker known for his multiple Award-Winning Feature Film "Crushed Wings".

== Early life ==
Lalit Bhusal was raised in India and then in Nepal, his father was in the Indian Army and his mother worked as a social worker. Bhusal has been residential in the United Kingdom since 2000 and currently his company is base in United Kingdom and Netherlands.

== Career ==
Bhusal worked for various film Asian and English film projects since 2001 and he started his film making career in 2010 with the short film "Trash or Treasure" which was released in the same year.

He is the director and producer of the award-winning short film "Leeches" which received the Award of Merit in the international film festival in Jakarta. The film highlights the unnoticed illegal human trafficking for sex trade in the UK. In an interview published in the Ekantipur he explains what triggered him to start writing a screenplay for the film. Bhusal feels that human trafficking and forced sexual slavery is a serious crime and a violation of human rights and hopes that the film will contribute in educating on human trafficking resulting a psychological change in the human traffickers."

Bhusal's feature Film Crushed Wings, a 2021 drame about female genital mutilation, forced marriages and domestic violence within the Asian society, has won more than 40 Award from International Film Festivals. As of November 2026, Crushed Wings is available on streaming platforms including Prime Video and Apple TV (for rental or purchase), Fawesome, Plex, and Tubi.

== Awards ==
- 2021 - More than 40 Awards and nomination from International Film Festival for film Crushed Wings.
- 2015 - Award of Merit in the International Film Festival in Jakarta.

== Filmography ==
Year	Film	Worked as
2012	Trash or Treasure	Director, Producer and Director of Photography
2014	Man of God	Director of Photography, Associate Producer
2015	Leeches	Director, Producer, Writer
2021	Crushed Wings	Director, Producer, Writer
