= Kashish (serial) =

- Written by: Kamna Chandra
- Starring: Sudesh Berry; Malvika Tiwari
- Original language: Hindi
- No. of seasons: 1
- No. of episodes: 8

Original release
- Network: DD National
- Release: 1992 – 1993

Kashish (Attraction) is an Indian romantic drama television serial broadcast on Doordarshan between 1992-93. It starred Sudesh Berry and Malvika Tiwari as the male and female lead of the show. The story was written by Kamna Chandra. The serial consisted of 8 episodes.

== Synopsis ==
Sudesh Berry played the character of director Rahul Anand, who casts actress Mohana Kumar (Malvika Tiwari) in his show. How their indifference changes to love was shown in the serial. Kalpana Iyer played the role of Mrs Anand (Rahul's mother).

== Plot ==
Mona lives with her stage actress friend Priya, who encourages her to seriously pursue acting and makes her go for the audition of a new TV show. On her way, Mohana helps a random unwell woman who introduces herself as Mrs. Anand, drops Mrs. Anand at her lavish bungalow, and then rushes for the audition where despite being late, she gets selected for the role by Rahul Anand who was watching her audition from behind the scenes. However, Mona did not meet Rahul by then.

Mrs Anand invites Mona & Priya over tea as she grows fond of her helpful, humble, and self-respecting nature where she also gets to know Mona is doing her son's TV show but doesn't tell Mohana about it. She later invites the girls to her 50th Birthday Party.

At the party, Rahul behaves rudely with Mona thinking she used unfair influence to get to their party but later realizes his mistake when Mrs. Anand announces to all the guests that it was with Mona's help that she survived the other day. After the party, Priya gets a lift from the family doctor cum friend of Mrs Anand, Dr Merchant to her stage rehearsal venue, who also happens to be falling for her. Whereas Rahul drops Mohana home on insistence from his mother. On the way as he apologizes for his rudeness but he also makes it clear to her that he's aware his mother expects Mohana to be Rahul's bride but that Mona shouldn't even dream of a love affair let alone a wedding.

On the first day of the shooting, Mona had to rush Priya to Dr. Merchant's hospital due to appendix pain instead of going for the shoot. She tries to leave a message which isn't delivered to Rahul by an envious co-actress. Rahul fumes & packs up and decides to sack Mohana from the show. He's later informed by Mrs Anand about the medical emergency at Mona's end as she coincidentally happened to be at the same hospital for her regular checkups where Priya was admitted. Rahul meets Mona at the hospital & offers to drop her home. On the way they have a tensed conversation, however Rahul takes back his decision of sacking her.

During the shoots Rahul starts falling for Mohana for her grace, acting skills & helpful & composed nature, whereas Mohana also feels attracted to Rahul due to his professionalism.

On the end of the shoot, a shivering & sick man named Mohit Appears at the door of Mohana's room at the shooting site & asks for her help. Mona soon rushes him to the hospital while leaving a message with Rahul's production manager. Rahul sees her leaving with this unknown man and gets enraged & jealous as he expected Mohana to have informed him personally before leaving. However the Production Manager informs Rahul that she left the message to him since Rahul had a Do not disturb sign hanging on his door.

A frustrated and jealous Rahul disrespects Mohana when she visits to collect her pay cheque indirectly pointing towards Mohit & her other friends. Mohana refuses to take the cheque & leaves in rage while telling Rahul to learn some humanity.

Meanwhile their show is a success & launches Mohana to huge popularity & demand. While, Priya & Dr Merchant get married. Mrs Anand calls Mohana to congratulate & celebrate her & Rahul's success & calls for a party to which Mohana declines the offer and ends the call abruptly.

A disheartened Mrs Anand discusses this with Priya who tells her that Mohit is Mohana's brother who had a nervous breakdown post their parents' death & turned into a drug addict & is being treated at Dr Merchant's hospital now. Mrs Anand tells this to Rahul & he tries to mend terms with her but Mohana is too angry to listen however he tells her to not be angry with his mother for his wrong doings. Rahul meets with an accident that night and gets a temporary vision loss.

Mona incidentally visits Mrs Anand & gets the news about Rahul which shocks her & makes her realise & confess her love for Rahul to Mrs Anand. On being convinced by Mrs Anand, she affirms to take care of a temporarily blind Rahul till the bandage over his eyes are taken off, acting as a mute maid to see if Rahul confesses his love for her at any point of time while she gets to spend time with him. She wants to hear it from Rahul because he was the one who clearly told her in the beginning, to not even dream of them being together.

However Rahul could sense that the maid is Mohana but since he couldn't see her he isn't sure & though he reluctantly shares his feelings about Mona with the maid but never openly takes her name which frustrates Mona who wants to hear it loud and clear from him. Day before his bandage was to be removed Mona leaves disappointed that Rahul will never confess his love for her.

After getting his eyesight recovered the next day, Rahul gets schooled by Priya about his ego & not admitting his love for Mona, that's when he decides to finally see her. The show ends when Rahul meets a lonely Mona at a beachside and both hold hands.

== Cast ==
- Sudesh Berry as Rahul Anand
- Malvika Tiwari as Mohana Kumar
- Kalpana Iyer as Mrs. Anand (Rahul's mother)
- Preeta Mathur as Priya (Mohana's friend)
- Sanat Vyas as Dr. Merchant
