= Gazal Dhaliwal =

Indian screenwriter (b. 1982)

- Born: 1982 (age 43–44); Patiala, Punjab, India
- Occupations: Writer; Showrunner

Gazal Dhaliwal is an Indian screenwriter who wrote the screenplay and dialogues for Vinod Chopra Films’ Ek Ladki Ko Dekha Toh Aisa Laga, starring Rajkummar Rao, Anil Kapoor and Sonam K Ahuja. Previously, she worked on Alankrita Shrivastava's critically acclaimed Lipstick Under My Burkha as the dialogue writer and she wrote the dialogues and co-wrote the screenplay for Qarib Qarib Singlle, directed by Tanuja Chandra, starring Irrfan Khan and Parvathy. She also wrote additional dialogues for Wazir that starred Amitabh Bachchan and Farhan Akhtar.

She is also a public speaker and LGBTQ+ activist, who has spoken openly about being a transgender woman in several talks and in the media – most famously in an episode of the Aamir Khan-led talk show, Satyamev Jayate.

== Early life and education ==
Gazal Dhaliwal grew up in the city of Patiala in Punjab and was born to Bhajan Pratap Singh Dhaliwal and Sukarni Dhaliwal. In several interviews and talks, she mentions how for as long as she can remember, she always felt like she was a girl. However, growing up in a culture that celebrated a highly macho form of masculinity made it increasingly difficult for Gazal, who was bullied with homophobic and transphobic slurs. At the age of 14, she secretly went to a counsellor but was found out by her father, after which she told him about her identity. Gazal mentions that although her father acknowledged it, he thought that it was "a phase". When she was 17, cyber cafes connected Gazal to the internet, and she found out about gender dysphoria and sex reassignment surgery. However, it was a distant dream, and prevailing stigma and the lack of awareness pushed Gazal to run away from home and board a train to Delhi. However, she was terrified, and finally returned her parents' calls and promised to return home.

Gazal went to the British Co-ed High School in Patiala, and then pursued a Chemical Engineering degree from Malaviya National Institute of Technology, Jaipur. After graduation, she joined Infosys in Mysore as a software engineer. However, Gazal's passion lay in the world of Bollywood. In 2005, she quit her job and moved to Mumbai, studying filmmaking at Xavier Institute of Communications for a year, and assisted Govind Nihalani on an animated film script.

While at Xavier's, she and a few friends created a 20-minute documentary on transgender people, which interviewed doctors, psychiatrists and other transgender people in India. After it was released, she travelled to Patiala to show it to her parents. It was after this that her parents agreed to a sex reassignment surgery. She then spent the next three years undergoing sex reassignment and finally had the surgery in 2007, after which she returned to Patiala and worked at an advertising agency.

== Career ==
In 2009, Gazal Dhaliwal returned to Mumbai and wrote her first-ever movie script, reportedly shutting herself up in a room and writing for 25 days straight. Although that first script has not yet been turned into a movie, since then, Gazal has lent her voice to the scriptwriting process of several big-budget films.

In 2014, she also appeared in the third season of Satyamev Jayate, a television show dedicated to discussing social and political issues hosted by Indian actor Aamir Khan, in an episode titled "Accepting Alternate Sexualities". She also made her acting debut in 2015 in the short film Agli Baar, about slum dwellers' fight for their right to land.

Her screenwriting debut came with an opportunity as the Additional Dialogue Writer of Wazir, starring Amitabh Bachchhan, in 2016. Since then, she has been Dialogue Writer of Lipstick Under My Burkha, Qarib Qarib Single, Ek Ladki Ko Dekha Toh Aisa Laga, and the short film A Monsoon Date starring Konkona Sen Sharma.

== Activism ==
In 2016, Gazal attended the International Visitor Leadership Program (IVLP) on transgender rights in the US as a part of an 8-member team. It was the first Indian team of its kind to be part of a three-week exchange program that was organised by the US Department of State.

Gazal Dhaliwal has spoken out against the controversial Transgender Persons (Protection of Rights) Bill, 2018, and voiced her support for the scrapping of the Bill as it does not grant transgender people the right to self-determination of their gender identity, and makes no mention of the educational and professional reservation quotas for transgender people. She has also spoken about being okay with the constant tag of "trans woman" that is added to her many professional achievements as a scriptwriter. "In the professional world, I want to be known for my work rather than my status as a transwoman. My gender cannot be my only identity when I am writing a story because a story has no gender. Having said that I have a substantial reason to be okay with the tag 'transwoman' scriptwriter because I know the importance of the visibility of a transgender. Our community does not have enough representation which is very important," she said in an interview with Business Standard.

== Filmography ==
- Murder Mubarak (2024)
- Feels Like Ishq (2021)
- Mismatched (2020)
- Sepia (2019)
- A Monsoon Date (2019)
- Ek Ladki Ko Dekha Toh Aisa Laga (2019) (Screenplay)
- Qarib Qarib Singlle (2017) (Screenplay)
- Lipstick Under My Burkha (2016) (Dialogues)
- Wazir (2016) (Dialogues)
