= Manohari Singh =

Indian musician

- Also known as: ManohariDa
- Born: March 8, 1931; Kolkata, Bengal Presidency, British India
- Origin: Indian Gorkha
- Died: 13 July 2010 (aged 79) Mumbai, Maharashtra, India
- Genres: Duo Composition, Classics
- Occupations: Music director, Music arranger, saxophonist
- Instruments: Alto Saxophone, Soprano Saxophone, Tenor Saxophone, Trumpet, Flute, Piccolo, Clarinet, Mandolin, Pan Flute, Harmonium, Bansuri, Recorder
- Years active: 1942-2010

Manohari Singh (8 March 1931 – 13 July 2010) was an Indian music director, saxophonist and was the main arranger of seminal film composer R. D. Burman. He worked with Basudeb Chakraborty as a music composer, the duo also popularly known as Basu-Manohari.

== Early life ==
Manohari Singh was born in a Nepalese Bhusal family in Kolkata. His father and uncle used to play in brass bands. In 1942, he joined the brass band at Bata Shoe Company, Bata Nagar in Kolkata, under its Hungarian conductor Joseph Newman. When Newman left in 1945 to join His Master's Voice, Manohari followed. From classical music, he started playing Hindi and Bengali songs for the His Master's Voice orchestra, since Newman arranged music for many composers like Kamal Dasgupta, S. D. Burman, Timir Baran and Ravi Shankar. He also played flute and piccolo at the Calcutta Symphony Orchestra. Through fellow musicians such as Francisco Casanovas, conductor at the Symphony Orchestra and band leader at Firpo's Restaurant, George Banks, trumpet player at the Grand Hotel, and others, Manohari was introduced to the Calcutta nightclub scene. He had already tried his hand at the English key flute, the clarinet and the mandolin, but now he decided to learn the saxophone in order to be able to play at nightclubs.

== Career ==
When the conductor Joseph Newman left His Master's Voice in 1950 to settle in Australia, Manohari moved on to play at Firpo's with his own band. Urged by the music director Salil Chowdhury, Manohari decided to try his luck in Mumbai, moving there in 1958. His first break in the Hindi film industry was in 1958 with Sachin Dev Burman, as a saxophonist for the movie Sitaron Se Aage. He went on to play with many other music directors, his strongest association being with R.D. Burman, for whom he played the saxophone in many compositions. In addition to playing the alto saxophone, Manohari Singh was also the music assistant and arranger for R. D. Burman.

== Notable hits ==
Among other notable works, Manohari played on the hit "Gaata Rahe Mera Dil", composed by S.D. Burman, from the movie Guide. He also played for songs in the movie Chalte Chalte and Veer Zaara. He also released an album titled Sax appeal containing saxophone renditions of various Hindi movie music tracks Manohari Singh was said to deeply cherish his gold-plated Selmer saxophone (bought in New York City in 1969) and tried to avoid getting even his own fingerprints on it. He (as Basu-Manohari) composed for Sabse Bada Rupaiya, produced by Mehmood, starring Vinod Mehra and Moushmi Chatterji. Here is a romantic song "Wada Karo Sajan", one can enjoy the same beauty and touch of Panchanda.

== Awards ==
Manohari Singh was felicitated at the Yashwantrao Chavan Natya Gruha (auditorium) on 19 March 2006, on the occasion of his 75th birthday.

== Death ==
Manohari Singh died after a cardiac arrest on 13 July 2010 in Mumbai.

== Selected filmography ==
Santaan-1989 - Nepalese Movie Kanyadan- 1991- Nepalese Movie 'Sabse Bada Rupaiya - 1976 - Hindi movie (as Basu-Manohari)

== Memorable Nepali songs ==
Movie	Year released	Song	Singers
Kanyadan Nepalese Movie	1991	Dhiki-Chyau Dhiki-Chyau Ghwaar Ghwaar Jaanto	Sushma Shrestha, Deepa Narayan Jha (Gahatraj)
Kanyadan Nepalese Movie	1991	Gaau Swor Kholera Didi Ra Bahini (aka Teej Ko Rahar Aayo Baree Lai)	Sushma Shrestha, Deepa Narayan Jha (Gahatraj)
Kanyadan Nepalese Movie	1991	Kopilaa Maa Ranga Chadhyo Ful Haansa Thaalyo	Asha Bhosle
Kanyadan Nepalese Movie	1991	Yeti Dherai Maayaa Diyau, Baanchne Rahar Badhna Thaalyo	Asha Bhosle, Prakash Shrestha
Kanyadan Nepalese Movie	1991	Duniyaa Laai Tadhaa Chhoda, Aafnai Mann Laai Roja	Prakash Shrestha
Kanyadan Nepalese Movie	1991	Najaau Na Malaai Chhodee, Mukha Modi, Dil Todi, Chyaante Mayalu	Prakash Shrestha Sushma Shrestha
SantaanNepalese Movie	1989	Kahawase Aaibe Raam-Lachhuman	Prakash Shrestha, Sushma Shrestha, Udit Narayan, Deepa Narayan Jha (Gahatraj)
SantaanNepalese Movie	1989	Piratii Ko Kitaab Maa Naulo Paanaa Thapchhaun	Prasaad Shrestha (not to be confused with the more popular Prakash Shrestha) Sushma Shrestha
SantaanNepalese Movie	1989	Chha Bhane Maaya Chhapakkai Laaideu, Chhaina Bhane Maayaa Mohani Fukaaideu	Prakash Shrestha Deepa Narayan Jha (Gahatraj)
SantaanNepalese Movie	1989	Ishara Nai Nabujhne Timlaai Ma Ke Bhanu?	Deepa Narayan Jha (Gahatraj)
SantaanNepalese Movie	1989	Himaal Laai Saakshi Raakhi Aau Mitho Baachaa Garaun	Prakash Shrestha Deepa Narayan Jha (Gahatraj)
SantaanNepalese Movie	1989	Garbha Ko Peeda, Janma Ko Marma, Mutu Mai Khopera,	Udit Narayan,
