= Vikram Chandra (novelist) =

Indian-American writer (born 1961)

- Born: 23 July 1961 (age 65)
- Education: Kenyon College; Pomona College (BA); Columbia University School of the Arts; Johns Hopkins University (MA)
- Occupation: Writer
- Spouse: Melanie Abrams (divorced)
- Parent: Kamna Chandra
- Relatives: Tanuja Chandra (sister); Anupama Chopra (sister); Zuni Chopra (niece); Agni Chopra (nephew)
- Writing career
- Years active: 1993–present
- Notable work: Sacred Games

Vikram Chandra (born 23 July 1961) is an Indian-American writer. His first novel, Red Earth and Pouring Rain, won the 1996 Commonwealth Writers' Prize for Best First Book.

== Early life ==
Chandra was born in New Delhi in 1961. His father Navin Chandra was a business executive. His mother Kamna Chandra has written several Hindi films and plays. His sister Tanuja Chandra is a filmmaker and screenwriter who has also directed several films. His other sister Anupama Chopra is a film critic.

Chandra did his high school education at Mayo College in Ajmer, Rajasthan where he was in Bikaner and Tonk house. He was batch of 1979 in Mayo College. He attended at St. Xavier's College in Mumbai and, as an undergraduate student, transferred to Kenyon College in the United States. Chandra felt isolated at Kenyon so he transferred to Pomona College, Claremont, California, where he graduated with a B.A. magna cum laude in English. He attended film school at Columbia University, leaving halfway through to begin work on his first novel. He received his M.A. from The Writing Seminars at Johns Hopkins University in 1987. He has taught at George Washington University, and lectured at University of California, Berkeley.

== Career ==
Red Earth and Pouring Rain (1995), Chandra's first novel, was inspired by the autobiography of James Skinner - the Irish Raja of Hansi in Haryana, a legendary nineteenth-century Anglo-Indian soldier. It was published in 1995 by Penguin Books in India; by Faber and Faber in the UK; and by Little, Brown in the United States. It won the Commonwealth Writers Prize for Best First Book and the David Higham Prize for Fiction. The novel is named after a poem from the Kuruntokai, an anthology of Classical Tamil love poems.

Love and Longing in Bombay [pl] (1997), a collection of short stories, was published by the same houses as Red Earth and Pouring Rain. It won the Commonwealth Writers Prize for Best Book (Eurasia region) and was short-listed for the Guardian Fiction Prize. In 2000, Chandra served as co-writer, with Suketu Mehta, for Mission Kashmir, a Bollywood movie. It was directed by his brother-in-law, the director Vidhu Vinod Chopra, and starred Hrithik Roshan.

Sacred Games (2006) is Chandra's most recent novel. Set in Mumbai, it features Sartaj Singh, a policeman who first appeared in Love and Longing in Bombay. Over 900 pages long, Sacred Games was one of the year's most anticipated new novels. It had been the subject of a bidding war amongst leading publishers in India, the UK, and the US. It has also been adapted as a web television series by Netflix.

Geek Sublime: The Beauty of Code, the Code of Beauty (2014) was a finalist for the National Book Critics Circle Award (Criticism).

== Personal life ==
Chandra was married to the writer Melanie Abrams. After their divorce, he married the writer Asun Álvarez. Chandra currently divides his time between Mumbai, India, and Oakland, California, United States. He has two children, Leela and Bean.

== Bibliography ==
- Red Earth and Pouring Rain: A Novel. Hachette Digital, Inc. 1995. ISBN 978-0-316-13276-3.
- Love and Longing in Bombay: Stories, Penguin Books, 1997, ISBN 978-0-14-026572-9
- Sacred Games. Faber and Faber. 2006. ISBN 978-0-571-23118-8.; HarperCollins, 2007, ISBN 978-0-06-113036-6
- Geek Sublime: Writing Fiction, Coding Software. Faber and Faber. 2013. ISBN 978-0-571-31029-6.
- Sacred Games Netflix Tie-in Edition Part 1. Penguin. 2018. ISBN 978-0143445944
- Sacred Games Netflix Tie-in Edition Part 2. Penguin. 2018. ISBN 978-0143445951
- Mirrored Mind: My Life in Letters and Code. Penguin India. 2013. ISBN 978-0670086979.

== See also ==
- List of Indian writers
