= Anupama Chopra =

Indian author, journalist, film critic

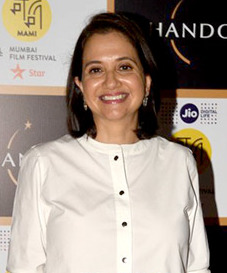
- Chopra in 2017
- Born: Anupama Chandra; Calcutta, West Bengal, India
- Education: St. Xavier's College, Mumbai; Medill School of Journalism (Northwestern University)
- Occupations: Author; journalist; film critic
- Spouse: Vidhu Vinod Chopra (m. 1990)
- Children: Zuni Chopra and Agni Chopra
- Mother: Kamna Chandra
- Relatives: Vikram Chandra (brother); Tanuja Chandra (sister); Ramanand Sagar (brother-in-law)

Anupama Vinod Chopra (née Chandra) is an Indian author, journalist and film critic who served as the festival director of the MAMI Mumbai Film Festival from 2015 to 2023. She is also the founder and editor of the now-defunct digital platform Film Companion, which offered a curated look at cinema with an emphasis on Indian film. She has written several books on Indian cinema and has been a film critic for NDTV and India Today, as well as the Hindustan Times. She hosted a weekly film review show, The Front Row With Anupama Chopra, on Star World. She won the 2000 National Film Award for Best Book on Cinema for her first book Sholay: The Making of a Classic. Chopra joined the Indian outlet of The Hollywood Reporter as it was launched in 2024, and remained it's editor until 2026.

== Early life and background ==
Born as Anupama Chandra in Calcutta, India to Chandra Prasad family, she has also lived in Badayun, a city in Uttar Pradesh. Her father, Navin Chandra, was the eldest among his siblings. Anupama's grandfather, originally from Delhi, was an executive with Union Carbide in Kolkata. Her mother, Kamna Chandra, was a scriptwriter who wrote dialogue for such films as Prem Rog (1982) and Chandni (1989). Chopra grew up with her brother and sister in Mumbai, where her family lived in the Nepean Sea Road neighbourhood, and then in Cuffe Parade. Her sister, Tanuja Chandra, is an Indian film director and screenwriter; her brother, Vikram Chandra, is a novelist, who splits his time between California and India. She also lived in Hong Kong for several years as a teenager. She graduated from St. Xavier's College, Mumbai with a BA in English Literature in 1987.

Later, Chopra earned her MA in journalism from Northwestern University's Medill School of Journalism. She won the Harrington Award for "academic excellence and promise for success in the field of magazine journalism" while at Medill. She later said, "Film journalism was untouchable at the time. Everybody was ashamed and nobody wanted to admit that I worked for movies."

== Career ==
After her education, Chopra started her career as a film journalist and critic and over the years has written several books on films, especially Hindi cinema. She has written about the Hindi film industry since 1993 and has explored cinema in several mediums – print, television and digital. Her first book Sholay: The Making of a Classic (2000) won the 2001 National Film Award for Best Book on Cinema (India).

Chopra's 2011 book First Day First Show: Writings from the Bollywood Trenches, is a compilation of her articles on Hindi cinema over two decades, published by Penguin India.

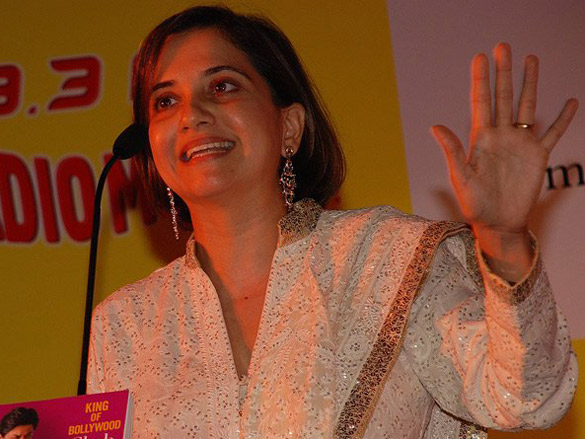
Chopra at her book launch, 2012

Chopra hosted a film review show, Picture This, on NDTV 24X7 news channel. In 2012, she started her weekly review show called The Front Row with Anupama Chopra, on Star World, which ran until June 2014. In 2013, she released two books, Freeze Frame, based on the interviews with film makers and actors on the TV show, and 100 Films to See before You Die based on her weekly film columns. In 2014, she also hosted a Hindi show called Star Verdict on Star Plus.

In November 2014, Chopra replaced Srinivasan Narayanan to become the festival director of the MAMI Mumbai Film Festival organized by the Mumbai Academy of the Moving Image (MAMI). She remained in this role until June 2024, when she stepped down and was replaced by interim festival director Shivendra Singh Dungarpur.

In December 2025, while working with The Hollywood Reporter India, she posted a review of the spy thriller Dhurandhar, which was met with social media trolling and widespread backlash. This resulted in the video being made private.

== Film Companion ==
In July 2014, Chopra founded the website Film Companion as a pan-India platform for entertainment journalism. The platform carried reviews, interviews, features and masterclasses on cinema, television and web series content. Chopra, Rahul Desai, Sucharita Tyagi and Pratayush Parasuraman wrote for the platform. Baradwaj Rangan also wrote for many years before leaving on 15 March 2022. In July 2024, Chopra announced that she was moving on to The Hollywood Reporter India, and that the Film Companion site was closing down.

== Awards ==
- 2000 National Film Award for Best Book on Cinema for Sholay: The Making of a Classic

== Personal life ==
Chopra is married to Vidhu Vinod Chopra, a producer and director of Hindi films. Her daughter Zuni Chopra (born 2001) is the author of three books, including a novel and two books in poetry. Her son Agni Dev Chopra is a cricketer.

== Bibliography ==
- Sholay: The Making of a Classic. Penguin Books, 2000. ISBN 014029970X.
- Dilwale Dulhania Le Jayenge, British Film Institute, 2002. ISBN 0851709575.
- King of Bollywood: Shah Rukh Khan and the Seductive World of Indian Cinema. Grand Central Publishing, 2007. ISBN 0446508985.
- First Day First Show: Writings from the Bollywood Trenches. Penguin Books India, 2011. ISBN 0143065947.
- Freeze Frames. Om Books, 2013. ISBN 9381607117.
- 100 Films to See before You Die. BCCL, New Delhi, 2013. ISBN 9382299351.
- The Front Row: Conversation on Cinema. HarperCollins Publishers India, 2015. ISBN 9789351770015.
- In Conversation with the Stars. Rupa Publications, 2019. ISBN 9789353335182
