= Advaita (band) =

Indian fusion band

- Origin: New Delhi, India
- Genres: Alternative rock; ambient; folk rock
- Years active: 2004–present
- Label: EMI Records
- Members: Abhishek Mathur; Aman Singh; Anindo Bose; Chayan Adhikari; Gaurav Chintamani; Mohit Lal; Suhail Yusuf Khan; Ujwal Nagar

Advaita are an Indian rock band based in New Delhi, formed in 2004.

== History ==
In March 2009, Advaita released their first album with EMI titled Grounded in Space. In 2011, Advaita was featured on the Indian leg of the MTV shows Coke Studio and MTV Unplugged. The band released their second album The Silent Sea in February 2012 with EMI Records. They have also performed in the hills. A festival named Kasauli Rhythm and Blues Festival, in which they performed for children suffering from various diseases from the age of 15 months till 16 years.

Advaita was one of four bands from India, selected by John Leckie, to record two songs with him for a compilation released by the British council.

"Drops of Earth" is a compilation album released on 22 March 2013.

Advaita currently has eight band members as follows:

- Abhishek Mathur - Guitars / Ukulele
- Aman Singh - Drums
- Anindo Bose - Keyboards / Backing Vocals
- Chayan Adhikari - Western Vocals / Acoustic Guitar / Rhythm Guitar
- Gaurav Chintamani - Bass
- Mohit Lal - Tabla / Percussion / Backing Vocals
- Suhail Yusuf Khan - Sarangi
- Ujwal Nagar - Hindustani Vocals

== Awards ==
Advaita won the GIMA (Global Indian Music Awards) 2012 award for best rock album for The Silent Sea. They also received a nomination under the best fusion album for The Silent Sea. Advaita were also voted the best fusion band by Palm Expo 2011. In its 2014 listing of "25 Greatest Indian Rock Songs of the last 25 Years", "Rolling Stone India" featured Mofunk (The Silent Sea, 2012), which is based on a Carnatic devotional poem by South Indian poet Muthuswami Diksithar.
