= Vidhu Vinod Chopra =

Indian film director and producer

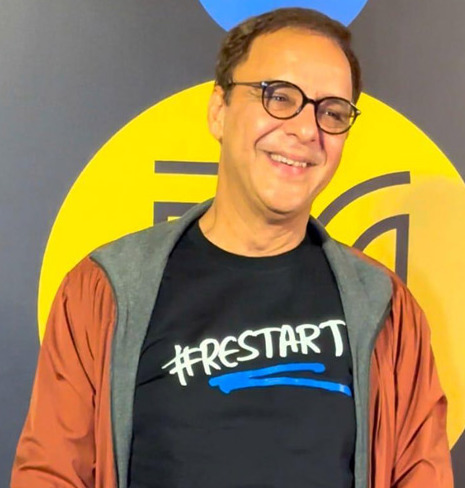
- Chopra in 2023
- Born: 5 September 1952 (age 74); Srinagar,Jammu and Kashmir, India
- Occupations: Film director; film producer; screenwriter; editor
- Spouses: Renu Saluja (m. 1976; div. 1983); Shabnam Sukhdev (m. 1985; div. 1989); Anupama Chandra (m. 1990)
- Children: 3, including Zuni Chopra and Agni Chopra
- Relatives: Ramanand Sagar (half-brother); Kamna Chandra (mother-in-law); Vikram Chandra (brother-in-law); Tanuja Chandra (sister-in-law)
- Website: vinodchoprafilms.com

Vidhu Vinod Chopra (born 5 September 1952) is an Indian film director, producer, screenwriter and editor. He is the recipient of several accolades, including seven National Film Awards and ten Filmfare Awards. He is known for directing films such as the crime drama Parinda (1989), the patriotic romantic drama 1942: A Love Story (1994), the action drama Mission Kashmir (2000) and the biographical drama 12th Fail (2023). He is also known for producing the Munna Bhai film series, 3 Idiots (2009), PK (2014), and Sanju (2018) under his banner Vinod Chopra Films. His career has spanned more than four decades and includes work in Hindi- and English-language cinema. His documentary An Encounter with Faces (1978) was nominated for the Academy Award for Best Documentary Short Film.

== Early life ==
Chopra was born and brought up in Srinagar, Jammu and Kashmir, India to a Punjabi Hindu family. His father was D. N. Chopra and veteran filmmaker Ramanand Sagar was his half-brother. His brother, Vir K. Chopra, was a scholar of Indian politics and worked as a producer. His parents were originally from Peshawar, British India. His mother was Shanti Devi Mahalakshmi, who left Kashmir, due to the Kashmir conflict in 1990. He dedicated his film Shikara to his mother. He studied film direction at the Film and Television Institute of India in Pune.

== Career ==
Chopra's first student short film, Murder at Monkey Hill (1976), won the National Film Award for Best Short Experimental Film and the Guru Dutt Memorial Award for Best Student Film.

This was followed by a short documentary highlighting the plight of India's destitute children, called An Encounter with Faces (1976), which was nominated for the Academy Award for Best Documentary Short Film in 1979. It also won the Grand Prix at the Tampere Film Festival in 1980.

Sazaye Maut, his first full-length feature film, was an adaptation of his previous short, Murder at Monkey Hill. It starred Naseeruddin Shah, Radha Saluja and Dilip Dhawan. Vanraj Bhatia composed the music for the film.

He founded his own production company, Vinod Chopra Films, in 1985. Since then, the company has gone on to produce major Bollywood films, and is currently one of the biggest and most successful film production houses in India.

Chopra directed and produced Khamosh (1986), which starred prominent Indian actors such as Shabana Azmi, Amol Palekar, Naseeruddin Shah and Pankaj Kapoor, among others. The movie is set in Kashmir and has been praised by critics as an inventive meta thriller.

His next directorial, the crime drama Parinda (1989), proved to be a landmark film in Hindi cinema. It expanded the orbit of the crime drama and the vocabulary of images used in Hindi films while garnering widespread critical acclaim and numerous awards. Several modern Indian filmmakers have expressed their admiration for and drawn inspiration from Chopra's film.

Chopra's next film, 1942: A Love Story (1994), was a patriotic romantic drama set during the decline of the British Raj. With Anil Kapoor and Manisha Koirala in lead roles, it was also the last film to have its music composed by the legendary R. D. Burman. Burman received a Filmfare Award for Best Music Director and the film won a total of nine awards at the 40th Filmfare Awards. His following two films, Kareeb and Mission Kashmir, were also critically and commercially successful.

Chopra then produced 5 films with filmmaker Rajkumar Hirani: Munna Bhai MBBS, Lage Raho Munna Bhai, 3 Idiots, PK, and Sanju. The first 3, which Chopra also co-wrote, each won the National Film Award for Best Popular Film Providing Wholesome Entertainment, and Lage Raho Munna Bhai also won the National Film Award for Best Screenplay. They were all also very commercially successful, with 3 Idiots and PK becoming the highest grossing Indian films of all time in India and worldwide, also breaking into East Asian markets. He also wrote and produced Parineeta, Ferrari Ki Sawaari, and Wazir.

In 2007, Chopra directed Eklavya: The Royal Guard, which was selected as India’s submission for the Academy Award for Best Foreign Language Film. He directed Broken Horses (2015), his English-language directorial debut, and Shikara (2020), a film about a Kashmiri Pandit couple during the exodus of the 1990s. Shikara was not a box-office success. Broken Horses received a Rotten Tomatoes rating of 22%, and earned Rs. 60 lakh in its opening weekend.

Chopra directed 12th Fail (2023). The film won five awards at the 69th Filmfare Awards, including Best Film and Best Director. After a low opening day, it became a commercial hit through reviews and word of mouth, grossing 70 crores on a 20 crore budget.

In July 2026, Vinod Chopra Films entered into a long-term partnership with NH Studioz, which was to manage licensing, distribution and global syndication of the company’s film catalogue. The catalogue includes films directed or produced by Chopra, such as Parinda, 1942: A Love Story, 3 Idiots and Shikara.

In August 2026, 1942: A Love Story was re-released in Indian cinemas in an 8K-restored version with Dolby 5.1 sound.

== Filmography ==
Year	Film	Credit as			Notes
Year	Film	Director	Writer	Producer	Notes
1976	Murder at Monkey Hill	Yes	Yes	No	Diploma film; also Actor
1978	An Encounter with Faces	Yes	No	No	Documentary film, nominated for the Oscars.
1981	Sazaye Maut	Yes	Yes	Yes	
1983	Jaane Bhi Do Yaaro	No	No	Production Controller	also Actor
1986	Khamosh	Yes	Yes	Yes	
1989	Parinda	Yes	Yes	Yes	
1994	1942: A Love Story	Yes	Yes	Yes	
1998	Kareeb	Yes	Yes	Yes	
2000	Mission Kashmir	Yes	Yes	Yes	
2003	Munna Bhai MBBS	No	Yes	Yes	
2005	Parineeta	No	Yes	Yes	Supervising Editor
2006	Lage Raho Munna Bhai	No	Yes	Yes	Associate writer; lyricist
2007	Eklavya: The Royal Guard	Yes	Yes	Yes	
2009	3 Idiots	No	Yes	Yes	Screenplay Associate
2012	Ferrari Ki Sawaari	No	Yes	Yes	
2014	PK	No	No	Yes	
2015	Broken Horses	Yes	Yes	Yes	English Film
2016	Wazir	No	Yes	Yes	also Editor
2018	Sanju	No	No	Yes	
2019	Ek Ladki Ko Dekha Toh Aisa Laga	No	No	Yes	
2020	Shikara	Yes	Yes	Yes	co-writers: Rahul Pandita and Abhijat Joshi
2023	12th Fail	Yes	Yes	Yes	Also Editor; Singer, "Restart" and "Restart" (Rap 'N' Folk)
2024	Zero Se Restart	No	No	Yes	Documentary

== Television ==
Title	Year	Role	Notes
Yeh Jo Hai Zindagi (DD National)	1984	Himself	Episode 32: "Dieting"

== Bibliography ==
Year	Name	Co Writer(s)	Notes
2021	Unscripted: Conversation on life and cinema	Abhijat Joshi	

== Awards and nominations ==
List of Vidhu Vinod Chopra awards and nominations
Year	Category	Nominated work	Result	Ref.
National Film Awards
2003	Best Popular Film Providing Wholesome Entertainment	Munna Bhai MBBS	Won	
2006	Best Popular Film Providing Wholesome Entertainment	Lage Raho Munna Bhai	Won	
2006	Best Screenplay	Lage Raho Munna Bhai	Won	
2009	Best Popular Film Providing Wholesome Entertainment	3 Idiots	Won	
2023	Best Feature Film	12th Fail	Won	
Filmfare Awards
1990	Best Film	Parinda	Nominated	
1990	Best Director	Parinda	Won	
1995	Best Film	1942: A Love Story	Nominated	
1995	Best Director	1942: A Love Story	Nominated	
2001	Best Film	Mission Kashmir	Nominated	
2001	Best Director	Mission Kashmir	Nominated	
2004	Best Film	Munna Bhai MBBS	Nominated	
2004	Best Screenplay	Munna Bhai MBBS	Won	
2007	Best Film	Lage Raho Munna Bhai	Nominated	
2007	Best Story	Lage Raho Munna Bhai	Won	
2007	Best Dialogue	Lage Raho Munna Bhai	Won	
2010	Best Film	3 Idiots	Won	
2010	Best Screenplay	3 Idiots	Won	
2014	Best Film	PK	Nominated	
2019	Best Film	Sanju	Nominated	
2024	Best Film	12th Fail	Won	
2024	Best Director	12th Fail	Won	
2024	Best Film (Critics)	12th Fail	Nominated	
2024	Best Screenplay	12th Fail	Won	
2024	Best Dialogue	12th Fail	Nominated	
2024	Best Editing	12th Fail	Won	

=== IIFA Awards ===
- 2007: Winner, Best Screenplay for Lage Raho Munna Bhai
- 2001: Nominated, IIFA Award for Best Director for Mission Kashmir
- 2010: Winner, Best Screenplay for 3 Idiots

=== Stardust Awards ===
- 2009: Winner, Readers' Choice Award for 3 Idiots

=== FICCI Awards ===
- 2009: Winner, Most Successful Film of the Year for 3 Idiots

=== Screen Awards ===
- 2006: Winner, Best Film for Lage Raho Munnabhai
- 2006: Nominated, Best Screenplay for Lage Raho Munna Bhai
- 2009: Winner, Best Film, 3 Idiots
- 2009: Winner, Best Screenplay, 3 Idiots

=== Zee Cine Awards ===
- 2007: Winner, Best Screenplay for Lage Raho Munna Bhai
- 2005: Winner, Best Dialogue for Parineeta
- 2005: Winner, Best Director for Mission Kashmir

=== Tampere International Short Film Festival ===
- 1980: Winner, Grand Prix for An Encounter with Faces

== Personal life ==
He has been married thrice, his first wife was noted editor Renu Saluja (m. 1976–1983), he was then married to filmmaker Shabnam Sukhdev (m. 1985–1989), the daughter of S. Sukhdev (1933–1979) a well known director of documentaries for the Films Division of India. He has a daughter with Shabnam, Ishaa Chopra, who works as a dance instructor and choreographer.

He is currently married to Indian film critic Anupama Chopra, whom he married on 1 June 1990. He has two children with her, a son, Agni and a daughter, Zuni Chopra.
