= Munna Bhai (disambiguation) =

Munna Bhai, is a fictional character in Indian films, created by Rajkumar Hirani and portrayed by Sanjay Dutt.

Munna Bhai may also refer to:

- Munna Bhai (film series), an Indian film series centred on the character
  - Munna Bhai M.B.B.S., a 2003 Indian comedy film by Rajkumar Hirani, starring Sanjay Dutt as the titular character
  - Lage Raho Munna Bhai, a 2006 Indian comedy film by Rajkumar Hirani, sequel to the 2003 film
    - Gandhigiri, revival of Gandhian values as inspired from the film
  - Munna Bhai Chale Amerika, an unrealized sequel to the 2006 film
- Sidhant Mohapatra (born 1966), popularly known as Munna Bhai, an Indian actor in Odia cinema

== See also ==
- Munna (disambiguation)
- Bhai (disambiguation)
- Circuit (film character), a supporting character from the film series, portrayed by Arshad Warsi
- Munnu Bhai, Pakistani writer
- Mahavatar Swami Bhai, Argentine yoga teacher
