= Kamal Haasan's unrealized projects =

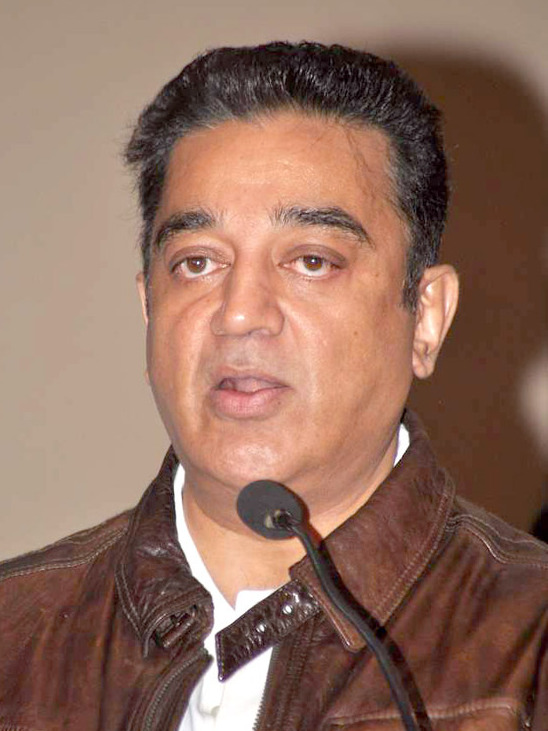
Haasan promoting Vishwaroopam in 2013

Kamal Haasan is an Indian actor, director, producer, screenwriter, playback singer and lyricist who works primarily in Tamil cinema. He has also worked as an assistant director, choreographer, editor, make-up artist, narrator, television host, and a distributor of films. Some of his projects did not progress to post-production, fell into production limbo or were officially cancelled.

== 1960s ==
=== Mangala Mangai ===
Mangala Mangai, starring Kamal Haasan as a child actor, has not been released.

== 1980s ==
=== Chamayam ===
Chamayam is a 1981 Malayalam-language movie directed by Sathyan Anthikad and written by John Paul Puthusery. Kamal Haasan and Ambika were meant to star in the film, but the project was later shelved. The project was abandoned because of the death of producer Majendran, who has co-produced the 1981 film Sambhavam.

=== Raja Ennai Mannithuvidu ===
In 1982, C. Rudhraiya began a venture titled Raja Ennai Mannithuvidu, with Kamal Haasan playing younger brother to Chandrahasan. Sujatha was cast as the latter's wife and Sumalatha was to play Kamal's heroine. The story dealt with the conflict between the peacenik older brother and the Naxal leanings of the Kamal character. The film was shot simultaneously in Telugu language. After 15 days shoot, this movie was shelved. One song recorded for the film by Ilaiyaraaja were later used in Mohan starrer Anbin Mugavari (1985).

=== Top Tucker ===
Directed by Bharathiraja, Top Tucker was to have starred Kamal Haasan and Radha. The project began in 1982 after the release of Tik Tik Tik (1981), and was briefly also referred to under the title of Sivappu Sattai. After 5,000 feet (1,500 m) was canned, the film was shelved as Bharathiraja felt it was becoming too similar to his and Kamal's earlier film Sigappu Rojakkal (1978), and decided to collaborate with Kamal on a different film, which eventually became Oru Kaidhiyin Diary (1985).

=== Do Deewane Pyar Ke ===
Dev Anand and Kamal Haasan signed on to work together on a Hindi film titled Do Diwane Pyar Ke in the early 1980s. The film was also set to feature Smita Patil, Reena Roy and Padmini Kolhapure in further lead roles, and was set to be made by producer-director Prakash Verma, who had earlier written the story of Dev Anand's Lootmaar (1980). The film was later dropped owing to creative differences between Dev Anand and Verma.

=== Jigar ===
Kamal Haasan worked on I. V. Sasi's Hindi film Jigar in 1983, featuring in scenes alongside actress Vijayta Pandit. Production on the film stalled in the mid-1980s, and the film re-emerged with a new title in 1985 as Mera Khoon, with Govinda taking Kamal Haasan's role. However, the film eventually did not have a theatrical release.

=== Khabardar ===
Director T. Rama Rao started working on the film in 1984, which was a social drama centred upon a terminally ill patient and a doctor, produced by Poornachandra Rao. Kamal Haasan, Amitabh Bachchan, Jaya Prada and Sridevi worked on the film which revolved around the notion of euthanasia. However, after shooting a substantial portion of the film, it was suddenly shelved.

In 1996, referring to the film under the working title of Kanoon Ke Kathere Mein, Kamal Haasan revealed that he had completed most of his work on the film in a 25-day period. He was then told by the producers that they were unhappy with the output, and he mutually agreed to stop working on the project after receiving half his remuneration. In the early 1990s, the makers approached Kamal Haasan to finish the film but he refused citing other commitments. In 2020, K. Bhagyaraj stated that the film was stalled because Amitabh Bachchan had felt that the audiences would praise Kamal Haasan's portrayal rather than his, and subsequently asked to cancel the project.

=== Untitled adaptation of The Godfather ===
In the mid-1980s, Muktha Srinivasan planned to direct a film based on the American film The Godfather (1972) with Sivaji Ganesan, Kamal Haasan and Amala. He paid them an advance and confirmed their dates; however the project was dropped after Kamal Haasan's then associate Ananthu felt that it would be a Ganesan-focused film and not a Kamal film.

=== Ponniyin Selvan ===
In the late 1980s, Kamal Haasan and director Mani Ratnam worked together on adopting Kalki Krishnamurthy's historical novel Ponniyin Selvan into a film. Composer Ilaiyaraaja and cinematographer P. C. Sreeram became attached to the project, with Sridevi, Rekha, Sathyaraj and Prabhu cast in pivotal roles. Ratnam revealed that he worked on a first draft of the film alongside Kamal Haasan, who had bought the rights of the novel from M. G. Ramachandran, but the pair shelved their plan as the project did not make financial sense at the time.

In an interview with Filmfare in January 1994, director Mani Ratnam stated that it remained one of his "dream projects" and that he had hoped to work on during his career. Kamal Haasan then attempted to make the story into a forty-part television series, and worked with writer Ra. Ki. Rangarajan on the screenplay, but the project was later stalled.

Ratnam later made the film and split it into 2 parts which were released in 2022 and 2023 respectively, with Kamal Haasan working on the film as a narrator. The film featured an ensemble cast including Vikram, Aishwarya Rai Bachchan, Karthi, Jayam Ravi and Trisha.

== 1990s ==
=== Athi Veerapandiyan ===
In the early 1990s, Gangai Amaran agreed terms to direct a film titled Athi Veerapandiyan starring Kamal Haasan in the lead role. The film was based on jallikattu and Aishwaryaa Bhaskaran was signed to portray the leading female role. However Kamal Haasan later opted out of the film and instead began work on another rural drama, Thevar Magan (1992), directed by Bharathan. He later credited Gangai Amaran for the idea of the song "Sandhu Pottu" from the film, which was initially meant for Athi Veerapandiyan.

In 2016, Gangai Amaran alleged that his brother Ilaiyaraaja had effectively told Kamal Haasan to stop working on the project, during an ego clash between the two brothers.

=== Kanden Seethaiyai ===
Balachandra Menon wanted to remake his Malayalam film Ammayane Sathyam (1993) into Tamil, and turned down remake offers from other directors. Producer Raveendran signed on Kamal Haasan to do the film and recruited S. P. Balasubrahmanyam to take another role. The team initially approached Annie, who starred in the original to reprise her role as the lead female character, though her reluctance meant that the team picked newcomer Ruchita Prasad, who adopted a stage name of Jayasandhya.

The makers abandoned the project due to creative differences. It was later alleged that Kamal Haasan had wanted his role to be more prominent than the character from the original version. Kamal Haasan subsequently wanted to remake this film with KS Ravikumar as the director and Crazy Mohan as the script writer. But when initial script discussions were underway, Crazy Mohan apparently lost the script, which was misplaced by him in an unknown car. Since there had been too many hindrances in the development of the movie, Kamal moved on to begin work on Avvai Shanmugi (1996).

=== Ladies Only ===
A remake of the Tamil film Magalir Mattum (1994) which itself was inspired by the 1980 American film 9 to 5, the film is yet to have a theatrical release for unknown reasons. Produced by Kamal Haasan, Ladies Only is the story of three women, Seema Biswas, Shilpa Shirodkar and Heera Rajagopal working in the same office. They are constantly harassed by their lecherous boss Randhir Kapoor. The three decide to gang up against him to teach a lesson, but a strange accident complicates things when the boss lands in a hospital and the three women end up with the dead body of a terrorist, played by Kamal Haasan.

=== Amaara Kaaviyam ===
In the mid-1990s, Kamal Haasan worked on the script of a film titled Amaara Kaaviyam, while working on Ladies Only and Avvai Shanmughi (1996). His wife at the time, Sarika, was expected to direct the film, while Nagma and Shilpa Shetty were reported to be a part of the cast. Kamal Haasan took a trip to the United States to learn about more filmmaking technology during the pre-production process. The film was subsequently never made.

=== Marudhanayagam ===
Kamal Haasan had been pondering directing a historical film for a period of four to five years, when writer Sujatha suggested that Kamal Haasan looked at a folk ballad edited by Tamil scholar Vanamamalai, which introduced them to the historical figure of Muhammed Yusuf Khan, an 18th-century warrior. Kamal Haasan immediately agreed at the prospect and felt that the story had all the potential of a good historical film, being appealed to by the elevation from the nadir to the top of Khan's life. Sujatha revealed that nearly 80% of the film would faithfully adapt Samuel Charles Hill's biography of Khan, also known as Marudhanayagam, and to only use imagination where no solid or substantial information is available.

The producers and Kamal Haasan managed to rope in Queen Elizabeth II to appear as the chief guest at the launch of the project which took place in the MGR Film City on 16 October 1997. The launch also saw the inaugural shot canned with Kamal Haasan, in the persona of Marudhanayagam, hearing and reacting to an imperial announcement read out by the character played by Nassar, with Om Puri's character looking on. Official filming began several months later in Velangudi on 10 August 1998 with a scene of where a companion of the lead character, played by Kamal Haasan, is hanged prompting a brief altercation.

Works on Marudhanayagam suddenly ceased after a British company that had planned to co-produce the film backed out and the film has been indefinitely postponed since. Haasan had invested ₹ 8 crores of his own wealth into the project through and has since revealed that the film would be revived at a future date. Since 1999, Kamal Haasan has consistently spoken of plans to revive the film.

=== Markandeyan ===
In the late 1990s, film producer K. T. Kunjumon was keen to make a pan-Indian film with Kamal Haasan in the lead role, and approached a series of directors to pitch a script for the production. Among the ideas was a script titled Markandeyan by A. M. Nandakumar, who had been collaborating in the period with Kunjumon on Kodiesvaran, one of the most expensive Tamil film productions at the time. Kunjumon subsequently ran into financial troubles from a number of his joint ventures, including on a significant deal with businessman Ramoji Rao, and subsequently the project with Kamal Haasan, as well as Kodiesvaran, was stalled.

=== Londonil Kameshwaran ===
Kamal Haasan had written the script of Londonil Kameshwaran and wanted to play the lead role in the late 1990s, but never got down to making it because he felt it would not have been cost-effective. Through the project, he had aimed to reprise his character of the Palakkad Brahmin cook Kameshwaran from Michael Madana Kama Rajan (1990) and place him in funny situations when he visits London. He had briefly considered making the film in early 1999 after Marudhanayagam had run into production troubles, but instead chose to prioritise his commitments for Hey Ram (2000). After the profitable Pammal K. Sambandam (2002), Mouli asked Haasan to re-collaborate with this particular script but Haasan was uninterested. Madhavan was selected by Haasan to replace him, after the pair had shot for Anbe Sivam together in the period, and the project was made under Haasan's production house with the title of Nala Damayanthi (2003).

== 2000s ==
=== Robot ===
Following the completion of his first directorial venture in Hindi, Nayak (2001), S. Shankar announced his next project, Robot, which was to feature Kamal Haasan and Preity Zinta. The film was to be produced by the now-defunct company Media Dreams, a division of Pentamedia Graphics. The film was reported to be a futuristic techno-thriller set in Chennai in around 2200 or 3000 AD. Despite the completion of a photoshoot featuring Haasan and Zinta, the project was shelved as a result of scheduling conflicts with Haasan. Shankar consequently started work on Boys (2003). The film was eventually revived and released in 2010 as Enthiran starring Rajinikanth and Aishwarya Rai.

=== Naran ===
After completing the shoot of Pammal K. Sambandam (2002), Kamal Haasan signed on to appear in Naran directed by K. S. Ravikumar. Produced by Ravikumar's manager P. L. Thenappan and featuring music by A. R. Rahman, the film was launched with a small ceremony in November 2001. Kamal Haasan was reported to play the lead role of a character named Narayanan, abbreviated to "Naran". Reported to be a tale about a man and a beast, the team had also been in talks with Amitabh Bachchan to be a part of the film. Ravikumar noted the "get-up itself would be different one" and that the team were contemplating to make it simultaneously in Hindi and Telugu. The film was later put on hold due to budget issues and Kamal Haasan moved ahead to work on Panchathanthiram (2002) with Ravikumar and Thenappan.

=== Panchatanthiram 2 ===
During the making of Panchatanthiram (2002), Kamal Haasan and K. S. Ravikumar contemplated making a sequel of the film, where the lead actors would be aboard a cruise liner. The project did not materialise owing to the actor's commitments, with the duo later setting Manmadan Ambu (2010) on a cruise liner instead.

Reports in May 2012 suggested that Aascar Ravichandran would produce a sequel to the film, which would begin production by October 2012, though it did not materialise. In August 2015, reports suggested that Moulee would make a sequel to the film. In August 2016, Ravikumar revealed that he had held discussions with Kamal Haasan about a potential sequel, where five women would take revenge on their mischievous husbands.

=== Moo ===
In late 2002, Kamal Haasan discussed plans of making a project titled Moo, which would be co-directed by Mani Ratnam and Singeetam Srinivasa Rao. The screenplay of the film was set to be inspired by the Rashomon effect, with three different interpretations of the same incident. However, Mani Ratnam did not accept terms to work on the project citing that he had begun work on Aayutha Ezhuthu (2004), which would have a similar plot device. Inspired to continue ahead with the idea, Kamal Haasan proceeded to make a different film, Virumaandi (2004), which focused on the interview of two prison inmates.

In late 2012, Hollywood producer Barrie Osborne expressed his interest in making Moo as an English film in association with Kamal Haasan, who would direct the project and feature in the lead role. The actor subsequently announced the project in February 2013, which was said to be about three lives. A potential English title of Triple Impact was speculated, while other sources titled the film as Yaavarum Kelir, with an English title of All Are Kin. The project later failed to develop. In 2017, sources suggested that the film was still under consideration.

=== Krishna Leela ===
In February 2004, Kamal Haasan and Singeetham Sreenivasa Rao began pre-production works on a project titled Krishna Leela. The film was set to narrate the story of an individual called Krishna Das, played by Kamal Haasan, and the women in his life. The project was described as a comedy entertainer, much like the actor and director's previous collaborations in the 1990s. Abhirami and Gautami were reported to feature alongside him in a leading role, while actresses Rohini and Vinodhini were also cast in roles. Comedians including Goundamani, Vadivelu, Senthil, Vivek and Chitti Babu were also added to the supporting cast. Seeking to cast two new actresses, Kamal Haasan scouted for talent in London. The film was later dropped, and Kamal Haasan and Rao considered working together for a different project, Mumbai Xpress (2005).

=== KG ===
Kamal Haasan, Singeetham Sreenivasa Rao and Ramesh Aravind discussed the script of a film titled KG in early 2004, usually during Kamal Haasan's visits to Bangalore. Described as a "cop thriller" to be shot in Tamil and Kannada around Bangalore, Kamal Haasan revealed that there would be no female lead and that it would be "quite a change" from his other films. In a turn of events, Kamal Haasan accepted an offer to star in Saran's Vasool Raja MBBS (2004), and put KG on hold. He later continued to work on KG, which marked Ramesh Aravind's directorial debut, and Mumbai-based financier Bharat Shah agreed to fund the film. The trio later decided to indefinitely postpone work on the project.

=== Vasool Raja MBBS 2 ===
Following the release of the Hindi film Lage Raho Munna Bhai in September 2006, Kamal Haasan and Saran contemplated remaking the film in Tamil. The pair had earlier made Munna Bhai M.B.B.S. (2003), the first of the Munna Bhai film series, in Tamil as Vasool Raja MBBS (2004). The pair later felt that the film's story of theme of Gandhigiri would not work in Tamil and opted against making a sequel in Tamil. The production studio, Gemini Film Circuit, then passed on the script to director Mohan Raja and actor Jayam Ravi, but the project never took off.

As the opportunity to remake Lage Raho Munna Bhai was passed upon, Saran and Kamal Haasan agreed to work on another project under the director's own studio, Gemini Productions. Kamal Haasan was paid an advance of two crore rupees for the project, but owing to financial issues, Saran decided to handover the production duties to Ayngaran International. Kamal Haasan later opted out of the project citing he was uncomfortable with the sudden change. Saran subsequently attempted to sue the actor for breach of contract.

=== Marmayogi ===
Marmayogi was first pondered by Kamal Haasan after the release of Aalavandhan (2001), however nothing proceeded. After a four-year sabbatical from directing films since Virumaandi (2004), Kamal Haasan announced Marmayogi as his next project after the completion of Dasavathaaram (2008). The film was planned as a bilingual Hindi-Tamil period film, set in the 7th century. Production house Pyramid Saimira along with Haasan's company Raaj Kamal Films International were set to produce the venture, and work began in late 2007. Early media reports suggested a box-office battle between Marmayogi and Shankar's Enthiran (2010), which was rebooted from the shelved Robot.

Pre-production on the film continued throughout 2008, with technicians such as Rajesh Selva and Sanu Varghese actively involved for close to a year. Meanwhile, Kamal Haasan grew a long, thick beard for the film. Mohanlal and Venkatesh were among the initial actors in the cast, as were actresses Hema Malini, Trisha, Shriya Saran and Sushmita Sen. Along with Trisha and Venkatesh, Kamal Haasan held a photoshoot at the AVM Studios in August 2008. Following the failure of Rajinikanth's Kuselan (2008), Pyramid Saimira opted out of the project in November 2008, effectively shelving the film. Kamal Haasan subsequently moved on to begin work on Unnaipol Oruvan (2009), and later filed a legal complaint against Pyramid Saimira for loss of earnings.

=== Thalaivan Irukkiraan ===
The project was first reported in the media in November 2008 as Kamal Haasan's next project, after his historical drama Marmayogi was shelved as a result of Pyramid Saimira's financial problems. Titled Thalaivan Irukkiraan and described by The Times of India as an "action adventure" film, it was said to be directed by Kamal Haasan and co-produced by Gemini Film Circuit and Sun Pictures, with A. R. Rahman working as the music composer. Pre-production works continued throughout late 2008, with actors such as Rishi Kapoor, Mohanlal and Venkatesh approached for leading roles. Actresses Trisha and Shriya Saran, who were originally a part of Marmayogi, were expected to be retained for the film in order to use the dates they had allotted for the shelved film. Kamal Haasan's Raaj Kamal Films International registered the film's title but production was postponed after a deal could not be agreed with the proposed co-producers. During the period, Kamal Haasan also pitched the idea of financing the film to Udhayanidhi Stalin of Red Giant Movies, who did not take up the offer citing that he felt the script was too political. He later used the dates offered by Mohanlal and Venkatesh for another of his productions, Unnaipol Oruvan (2009), which was incorrectly reported in the media as being the same project as Thalaivan Irukkiraan. In November 2010, Kamal Haasan revealed that he was busy writing the final draft of the film and would look to start production by March 2011 with American producers. Actress Anushka Shetty was also reported to have accepted to star in the film during the period, but the film was again stalled.

In January 2012, the film resurfaced with Kamal Haasan confirming that the film would be simultaneously made in Hindi under the title of Amar Hain. The media reported that the film would be produced by Aascar Ravichandran, with actors Mohanlal, Ajith Kumar, Ravi Teja and Katrina Kaif also in the cast, though this later proved to be untrue. Reports later in February 2012, suggested that Kamal Haasan had asked Shankar to direct the film, with Jackie Chan, Salman Khan, Prabhas and Asin amongst others speculated to be a part of the project. Chakri Toleti was also reportedly approached to be the film's director during July 2012, but the project still did not materialise. After three years of inactivity, in June 2015, Kamal Haasan announced that he was reviving the film and that Saif Ali Khan would feature alongside him in a leading role. Associating with Hindi producers Virender K. Arora and Arjun N. Kapoor, Kamal Haasan revealed that the project would be a "contemporary story which would touch upon politics, finance and the underworld" and "an action film with lots of emotion", while comparing the movie to Brian De Palma's film, The Untouchables (1987). He added that the film would be shot in Mumbai and Delhi in India, with schedules also planned in Jordan, the United Arab Emirates, the United Kingdom and the United States, while also that he would finish scripting the film after he finished work on the production of Thoongaa Vanam (2015). Despite the announcements, the producers backed out of the project and the film was again stalled.

After two more years of inactivity, in July 2017, Kamal Haasan suggested that he would revive the project after the release of Vishwaroopam 2 (2018) and Sabaash Naidu. Following a further period of quiet, where Kamal Haasan also revealed that he would stop acting, it was announced that composer A. R. Rahman and studio Lyca Productions became attached to the project in July 2019.

Later Kamal admitted in an interview that the Hindi version "Amar Hain", that was previously planned, became the first draft of the script for his film with Mani Ratnam, "Thug Life" and that Mani Ratnam took an idea from the script to develop a completely different one.

=== 19 Steps ===
In mid-2008, Kamal Haasan agreed terms to be a part of an Indo-Japanese production titled 19 Steps to be directed by Bharat Bala. The film was written by Malayalam scriptwriter, M. T. Vasudevan Nair and was set to tell the tale of a Samurai warrior trying to conquer the ancient Indian martial art of Kalaripayattu. Starring alongside Asin and Tadanobu Asano, Kamal Haasan was set to play the role of an Indian martial arts guru. The film was being produced by Walt Disney and pre-production work had begun with large portions set to be shot in Kerala. Twenty days before the film began shoot, Kamal Haasan dropped out and the film was subsequently reported to be shelved indefinitely. As recently as 2016, Bharat Bala and producer Phillip Lee have expressed their desire to continue the film with a different cast.

=== Buddham Sharanam ===
In mid-2009, Kamal Haasan agreed terms to work with Mysskin on a film about Buddha, titled Buddham Sharanam. Following the cancellation of Marmayogi and 19 Steps, Kamal Haasan was keen to work on a historical film with a similar theme, with the project also referred to in the media as 500 BC. He travelled to the United States to seek out production companies who were willing to fund the film, but no studio eventually agreed. Mysskin was then forced to drop the project and revealed it took him six months to get over the disappointment of the project's sudden end.

=== Yavarum Kelir ===
Following the release of Unnaipol Oruvan (2009), Kamal Haasan signed on to appear on a venture produced by Udhayanidhi Stalin and directed by K. S. Ravikumar. Titled Yavarum Kelir, Kamal Haasan had hoped to complete the comedy drama film before beginning work on his more time-consuming project, Buddham Sharanam, by Mysskin. Trisha was selected to play the lead female role, while Kamal Haasan's daughter Shruti Haasan was signed as the music composer.

The film was later dropped by March 2010, with Kamal Haasan, Trisha, Ravikumar and Udhayanidhi Stalin moving on to work on another project, Manmadan Ambu (2010), instead.

== 2010s ==
=== Tippuvum Unniaarchayum ===
In September 2011, film producer Gokulam Gopalan announced that he would make a multilingual film on the life of Indian ruler Tipu Sultan. Featuring a script written by John Paul, Gopalan described Kamal Haasan as being the only choice for the titular role. The film was set to be directed by Vayalar Madhavan Kutty, and was scheduled to begin production in March 2012 and to be completed in a four-month long schedule. Set to be shot in Tamil and Malayalam, Gopalan announced that the story would also have extensive coverage of the warrior queen of North Malabar, Unniyarcha. Sridevi was amongst the actresses considered for the role.

In January 2012, Kamal Haasan confirmed that pre-production work was underway for the film, and that it would avoid taking a controversial political angle. However, the project was later shelved owing to inconsistencies with the script. Kamal Haasan consequently worked with producer Gopalan in Thoongavanam (2015) to settle the proposed agreement of working together on a film.

=== Vaamamaargam ===
In December 2014, in a public interaction on social media with his daughter Shruti Haasan, Kamal Haasan announced that he was working on a project tentatively titled Vaamamaargam. Transliterated into English as "left-hand path", he suggested that the film's title was inspired by the Tamil terms given to aghoris and communists, before stating the film would be about "business ethics". He later clarified that the film was separate from Marudhanayagam, though the film eventually did not develop into production.

=== Paramapadham ===
Director Moulee and Kamal Haasan announced plans of working together during August 2015. Titled Paramapadham, the film was reported to be a comedy film on a bank heist. The film was set to be produced by Raaj Kamal Films International and have its script co-written by Crazy Mohan. Kamal Haasan had planned to shoot for the film alongside his commitments for Sabaash Naidu, but production did not begin by March 2016, with a spokesman for the actor noting that the film was still at its "primitive stages". In November 2016, Moulee refuted rumours that the pair were set to work on another project for AVM Studios titled Meyyappan.

In January 2021, Moulee revealed that he did not know when the film would materialise owing to Kamal Haasan's involvement in politics.

=== Amma Appa Vilayattu ===
In November 2015, Kamal Haasan and T. K. Rajeev Kumar agreed to collaborate on a project and announced that they were working on a family drama script to be titled Amma Appa Vilayattu in Tamil and Amma Naana Aata in Telugu. After initial discussions with Sridevi failed to materialise, Rajeev Kumar cast Amala Akkineni and Zarina Wahab in pivotal roles and announced that the film would be shot entirely across the United States, with schedules in New York and Georgia. The film was later postponed and by early 2016, Kamal Haasan chose to collaborate with Rajeev Kumar on a different project that he had written himself, Sabaash Naidu.

=== Sabaash Naidu ===
In early 2016, Kamal Haasan developed a story featuring the character of Balram Naidu, the RAW operative from his 2008 film Dasavathaaram for Sabaash Naidu, and T. K. Rajeev Kumar was handed directorial duties. Kamal Haasan had nurtured ideas of making a film on the character since late 2011 after seeing the popularity of the role. Co-produced by Raaj Kamal Films International and Lyca Productions, the film was launched in three languages, while the film would be released in four languages including Tamil, Hindi, Telugu along with a Malayalam dubbed version with the title Sabaash Naidu used for the Tamil, Telugu and Malayalam versions, and Shabhash Kundu used for the Hindi version. Kamal Haasan's daughter Shruti Haasan was selected for a key acting role, while his younger daughter Akshara Haasan joined the team as an assistant director. Ramya Krishnan, Brahmanandam and Saurabh Shukla were selected for other acting roles in the production. The team commenced the shoot in Los Angeles, California during June 2016.

The shoot of the film was initially put on hold in June 2016 after the original director T. K. Rajeev Kumar was diagnosed with Lyme disease, prompting Kamal Haasan to take over as the director. Two days after Rajeev Kumar's exit, the film's editor James Joseph also withdrew from the project after his wife had met with an accident. After the completion of the film's schedule in the US, Kamal Haasan chose to replace the original cinematographer Jaya Krishna Gummadi after being unimpressed with his work. In July 2016, Kamal Haasan fractured his leg after falling at his home in Chennai, with the incident leading to an indefinite delay of the project.

During the period of the production delay, in November 2016, Kamal Haasan split with his long time partner Gautami, who had also worked in the project as a costume designer. Delays meant that the actors in the project had committed to other films and it became difficult to coordinate all the cast members to partake in the shoot at short notice. In January 2017, plans to begin the film again were delayed following the death of Githamani, the wife of co-producer Chandrahasan. Two months after the death of his wife, Chandrahasan also died of a heart attack while visiting London. The film was further delayed as a result of Kamal Haasan's entry into politics, with the actor stating his final film could be Indian 2 for Lyca Productions. After a period of inactivity, in June 2022, Kamal Haasan revealed that he may revisit the film citing his interest of doing a comedy project, and that he had the intellectual property rights for the film.

=== Thevar Magan 2 ===
Following a month of speculation in September 2018, Kamal Haasan announced that he would make a sequel to Thevar Magan (1992) in mid-October 2018. Soon after the announcement, he revealed that Raaj Kamal Films International would produce the film, and that the project would likely undergo a change of title. The project created attention when political leader K. Krishnasamy of the Puthiya Tamilagam party objected to the film being titled as Thevar Magan 2, citing the risk of caste-based violence. By the end of 2018, the future of the project was put into question after Kamal Haasan stated his final film could be Indian 2 for Lyca Productions before moving on to be a full-time politician. In May 2019, it was reported that production may begin imminently in Pollachi following delays to Indian 2, but the plan did not materialise.

In June 2020, media reports suggested Vijay Sethupathi would portray the son of Nassar's character from the original, while other reports suggested that the film may be based on Thalaivan Irukkiraan, which Kamal Haasan had planned to restart during 2019 after a decade of delays. In August 2021, Kamal Haasan began collaborating with director Mahesh Narayanan on a script, said to be based on Thevar Magan 2. Along with Vijay Sethupathi, the makers were said to be in discussions with Vikram and Fahadh Faasil for pivotal roles. In December 2022, a source close to Haasan told Hindustan Times that the project has been shelved over creative differences. Later, Mahesh Narayanan himself clarified that Thevar Magan 2 had merely been put on hold for now.

== 2020s ==
=== Vettaiyaadu Vilaiyaadu 2 ===
Gautham Vasudev Menon confirmed that he was working on a sequel to his action-thriller Vettaiyaadu Vilaiyaadu (2006) in March 2020, and that he was in discussions with Kamal Haasan to reprise the lead character of Raghavan. He hinted that the character would be fifteen years older in the sequel, Jyothika's character of Aradhana would still be present, and that the pair would have a teenage daughter. He suggested that the film may take off in April 2020 and that Vels Film International would be the producers for the project. In June 2020, Menon revealed that he was still working on the script and that the climax of the film was still being considered. He also stated that he was unsure if Kamal Haasan would eventually accept terms to work on the film. The following month, the makers reportedly held discussions with Anushka Shetty and Keerthy Suresh for roles in the film. After a period of inactivity, media reports suggested that the team were still considering the project in August 2022.

=== Papanasam 2 ===
In early 2021, during the promotional campaign for Drishyam 2 (2021), director Jeethu Joseph revealed that he was interested in remaking the film in Tamil as Papanasam 2 with Kamal Haasan. The director's earlier film, Drishyam (2013), was earlier remade as Papanasam (2015) by Joseph with Kamal Haasan in the lead role. Since the shoot of Papanasam in 2015, Kamal Haasan and his partner-at-the-time, the lead actress Gautami had split, prompting other actresses to be linked to the leading female role. Actresses including Meena, Nadhiya and Pooja Kumar were reported to be in discussions for the film.

In April 2021, Kamal Haasan announced that the film would not happen as he was not thinking about taking on any new acting projects after his commitments to Vikram (2022) and Indian 2 (2024). In September 2021, Sripriya, the producer of Papanasam, revealed that the film would not happen without Kamal Haasan but that his schedule was too busy for him to take up the project, citing his involvement in Vikram, an untitled film with Vetrimaaran, his work as a host for Bigg Boss Tamil and his political commitments with Makkal Needhi Maiam.

=== KH 233 ===
In August 2022, H. Vinoth was reported to have met Haasan at his residence and narrated a political script which impressed the actor. Initially, the script was narrated to Vijay, when he was filming for Mersal (2017), but he declined the script and worked on Bigil (2019). On 4 July 2023, Haasan's banner Raaj Kamal Films International officially announced the project, confirming the project, under the tentative title KH 233. Pre-production works for the project began in September. Haasan went through gun training the same month. However, in the following January, it was officially confirmed that the project was dropped after reports speculated it for a few months.

== See also ==
- Kamal Haasan filmography
