= Bombay Hindi =

Variety of Hindustani spoken in Mumbai

- Bambaiya Hindi, Mumbai Hindi, Mumbaiya Hindi
- Native to: India
- Region: Mumbai, Maharashtra
- Language family: Indo-European: Indo-Iranian; Indo-Aryan; Central Indo-Aryan; Western Hindi; Hindustani; Bombay Hindi
- Signed forms: Indian Signing System

Language codes
- ISO 639-1: hi
- ISO 639-2: hin
- ISO 639-3: hin
- Glottolog: hind1269
- Linguasphere: 59-AAF-qf

Bombay Hindi, also known as Bambaiya Hindi, Mumbai Hindi, and Mumbaiya Hindi, is a variety of Hindustani spoken in Mumbai, which is located in the Konkan region of Maharashtra, India. Its vocabulary is largely derived from standard Hindi–Urdu, but it also draws from a substratum of Marathi, which is the official language of Maharashtra. Bombay Hindi also has elements of Gujarati.

== General ==
While many such local dialects have evolved in cosmopolitan cities around the world, Bombay Hindi is widely known throughout India, as a result of its frequent use in Bollywood movies. Initially, this dialect was used to represent crooks and uncouth characters as, to quote film critic Shoma A. Chatterji, "Indian films have the unique quality of different characters speaking different varieties of Hindi according to their social status, their caste, communal identity, education, profession, financial status, etc. [...] The villain's goons speak in a special vulgarised, Bambaiya Hindi concocted specifically to typify such screen characters in Hindi cinema.". Lately, however, Bambaiya Hindi has become popular and prominent, particularly with the success of the Munnabhai movies, in which the lead characters – being members of the Mumbai criminal underworld – speak entirely in this dialect.

Despite this increase in popularity, this dialect has its critics and is sometimes seen as being disrespectful and demeaning.

Among the more prominent neologisms which originated in Bambaiya Hindi but have spread throughout India are the words bindaas (from Marathi bindhast = without fear, relaxed; this word was incorporated into the Oxford English Dictionary in 2005) and Gandhigiri (coined in the movie Lage Raho Munna Bhai, a combination of Gandhi and -giri, which is similar to the English 'ism' (as in Gandhi-ism, though slightly more informal).

Bollywood has also incorporated many Marathi words in Hindi like weni, thaska, wakda, porgi, navri, navrai, kombdi, mulga/mulgi. Many Hindi songs have some Marathi words added.

== Words and expressions of Mumbai Hindi ==
Mumbai Hindi	Transliteration	English	Standard Hindi	Notes
अपुन	apun	we/us	हम (ham)	From Marathi आपण (aapaṇ) meaning an inclusive "we" or "us".
तेरेको	tereko	you (oblique case)	तुझे (tujhe)	Influenced by Deccani Urdu تیریکو (terekū, "you (oblique case)").
मेरेको	mereko	me (oblique case)	मुझे (mujhe)	Influenced by Deccani Urdu میریکو (merekū, "me (oblique case)").
धो डालना	dho ḍālnā	to beat up	पीट देना (pīṭ denā)	Used in the context of a physical fight between two people or teams. Lit. to wash up, as in the loser of the fight.
येडे/येडा/येडी	yeḍe/ā/ī	crazy	पागल (pāgal)	From Marathi वेडा (wedaa) meaning crazy.
इधरिच	idharīc	right here	इधर ही (idhar hī)	इधर ही+च, "च" added from Marathi for extra emphasis
उधरीच	udharīc	right there	उधर ही (udhar hī)	उधर ही+च, "च" added from Marathi for extra emphasis
कोपचा	kopcā	corner	कोना (konā)	From Marathi कोपरा (kopra) meaning corner.
कायको, कायकू	kāyko, kāykū	why	क्यों (kyõ)	From Deccani Urdu کئیکو (ka'īkū, "why").
लोचा or लोचा लबाचा	locā or locā labācā	problem	समस्या (samasyā)	From the Marathi/Hindi लोचा (locā) meaning "problem".
मचमच, बड़बड़	machmach, badbad	Someone who annoys you by talking their problems, crib-crib, rambling	खिटपिट (khiṭpiṭ)	From Marathi/Gujarati मचमच/बडबड macmac/baḑbaḍ
झकास, फट्टे, धासू, कड़क, ढिंचक, रापचिक, फट्टांग, एक नम्बर	jhakās, faṭṭe, dhāsū, kaṛak, ḍhincak, rāpcik, faṭṭāng, sallang, rawas, ek number	Excellent	बढ़िया (baṛhiyā)	From Marathi, various words meaning Excellent
मांडवली	mānḍavlī	Parley, negotiate	समझौता (samjhautā)	
टोपी, झोलर	ṭopī, jholar	Fraud	धोखा (dhokhā)	From टोपी पहनाना, meaning to fool or con someone, and झोल+er
नल्ला	nallā	Useless	प्रतिलिपि (pratilipi), छक्का (chakkā), हिजड़ा (hijṛā)	
शाणा	śāṇā	Smart fellow, clever, wiseass	होशियार (hośiyār), सयाना (sayānā), चालाक (cālāk)	From Marathi शहाणा (śahāṇā) clever.
साला, साली	sālā, sālī	Bastard (term of abuse)	हरामज़ादा (harāmzādā), हरामज़ादी (harāmzādī)	Literally meaning "brother/sister-in-law," implying that the speaker is in a sexual relationship with the person's sibling. Due to its commonality in everyday speech, it is considered less offensive than other terms. Also seen outside of Mumbai Hindi.
शाणापंती, शानपट्टी	śāṇāpantī, śānpaṭṭī	Acting smart	होशियारी (hośiyārī), सयानापन (sayānāpan)	Based on Marathi शहाणपण (śahāṇpaṇ) meaning acting smart.
चिड़िया	ciṛiyā	pager	पेजर (pejar)	literally means Sparrow
कौवा	kauvā	mobile phone	मोबाइल (mobāil) or दूरभाष (dūrbhāṣ)	literally means crow
घोड़ा	ghoṛā	Gun	बंदूक (bandūk) (specially for the trigger of the gun)	literally means horse
सटक ले, कट ले	saṭak le, kaṭ le	get out, beat it	खिसक ले (khisak le) or निकल ले (nikal le)	
घंटा, बाबा जी का ठुल्लू	ghaṇṭā, baba ji ka thullu	nothing	कुछ नहीं	literally means bell
टपोरी	ṭaporī	Dude, guy, hoodlum	आवारा, लफ़ंगा	See dedicated page Tapori (word)
मामा/मामू	māmā/māmū	Sir (Police)/gullible person (a fool)	साहब (sahāb), सरजी (sarjī) / भोला (bholā)	Local slang, literally means Maternal Uncle
सुल्टाना	sulṭānā	To resolve an issue	सुलझाना (suljhānā)	
फट्टू	phaṭṭū	coward	डरपोक (ḍarpok), कायर (kāyar)	From Marathi slang फटरू (phaṭarū) with the same meaning
मामा/पांडु	māmā, pāṇḍu	Cop	पुलिसवाला (pulisavālā)	Local slang, literally means maternal uncle; originating from the Marathi film Pandu Hawaldar
लफड़ा	laphṛā	Fight, problem, love affair	लड़ाई (laṛāī), प्रेम-संबन्ध (prēm-sambandh)	From Hindi word lafda
छावी, माल, आइटम, लैला, अग्ली	chāvī, māl, laila, agli	Girlfriend	प्रेमिका (premikā)	
चिकना, चिकनी	ciknā, ciknī	Fair complexioned person, well dressed person, gay person, homosexual	गोरा (gorā), गोरी (gorī)	Local slang, literally means smooth or slick/oily
ठासना or tharra	ṭhāsnā	Alcohol	शराब (śarāb) or मदिरा (madirā)	From Marathi ठासणे, meaning to stuff (one's body with alcohol)
हड़कना	haṛaknā	To eat	खाना (khānā)	
बाबल्या	bābalyā	bus driver/conductor or ticket collector		Marathi for baby (kid)
सुट्टा	suṭṭā	cigarette	सिगरेट (sigreṭ)	This slang term has achieved near-universal usage in India and Pakistan
सुट्टा मारना/लगाना	suṭṭā mārnā/lagānā	To smoke a cigarette	सिगरेट पीना (sigreṭ pīnā)	Literally means "to hit a cigarette" or "to apply a cigarette"
वाट लगना	vāṭ lagnā	to have a major problem, to be screwed	मुसीबत में आना (musībat mẽ ānā)	From Marathi word वाट लागणे (vāṭ lāgṇē)
वट ले, फूट, वंटास की गोली ले	vaṭ lē, phūṭ, vaṇṭās kī gōlī lē	Get out, Run from The problem, save your soul	भागना (bhāgnā), भगाना (bhagānā)	
डब्बा	ḍabbā	Police vehicle	पुलिस गाड़ी (pulis gāṛī)	From Marathi डबा, meaning a box
सामान	sāmān	weapon	हथियार (hathiyār)	literally means luggage or the stuff
कच्चा लिम्बू	kaccā limbū	rookie/ Noob	नौसिखिया (nausikhiyā)	Literally means "raw lemon." Usually used during gully cricket for a noob or to downright embarrass someone. To play "kaccā limbū" means to play with modified rules to make it easier for a noob.
लफड़ा नहीं करने का	laphṛā nahī̃ karnē kā	Do not fight	लड़ना मत (laṛnā mat) or लड़ाई नहीं करना (laṛāī nahī̃ karnā)	लड़ना (laṛnā) functions a verb, लफड़ा (laphṛā) as a noun
पतली गली से सटक ले	patlī galī se saṭak le	go away from here quietly	कोई रास्ता देख के भाग ले (koi rāsta dekh ke bhāg le)	It is used when you want to warn a person by telling him to go away from the scene
हवा आने दे	havā āne de	Go away, let me breathe some air		It is used when you want to warn a person by telling him to go away from the scene
अबे साले	abey sāle	hello friend, listen		Casual way of calling when another friend is not ready for something.
थकेला	thakelā	a weak person	कमज़ोर (kamzor)	used for a person who is not energetic or seems dull most of the time
हरी पत्ती	harī pattī	money	पैसा (paisā)	हरी पत्ती means green note, directly referring to the now demonetised 500 rupee note, which was green in colour
चूरन	cūran	Lie	झूठ (jhūṭh)	
टालिया / टकल्या	ṭāliyā / taklyā	Bald	गंजा (gan̄jā)	From Marathi/Hindi टकला (bald)
पेटी	peṭī	One Lakh Rupees	एक लाख रुपये (ek lākh rupaye)	One hundred thousand rupees
खोका	khokā	One Crore Rupees	एक करोड़ रुपये (ek karoṛ rupaye)	Ten million rupees
तिजोरी	tijorī	50 Crore or equivalent to 500 million INR.	पचास करोड़ रुपये (pachaas karoṛ rupaye)	500 million rupees
भिडू	bhiḍu	Friend	दोस्त (dost), यार (yār)	From Marathi भिडू, meaning a player in sports
बकरी	bakrī	Smartphone (with a touchscreen)	स्मार्टफोन (smārṭphōn)	literally means goat
भैंस	bhaĩs	Laptop computer	लैपटॉप (laipṭŏp), सुवाह्य संगणक (suvāhya saṅgaṇak)	literally means buffalo
हाथी	hāthī	Desktop computer	संगणक (saṅgaṇak)	literally means elephant
सुमड़ी में	sumaṛī mẽ	Incognito or secret	चुपके से (cupkē sē)	Local slang, means to do something without making any noise
बोल बच्चन	bol baccan	Talk	बातचीत (bātcīt)	Generally means a disparaging address to a talkative person, indicating that the content of his talk is previously known and so is uninteresting (Boring out of predictability, repetitive or tedious) and perhaps empty talk.
झोल	jhol	Scam	घपला (ghaplā), घोटाला (ghoṭālā)	Generally means scam. Sometimes can be used for arrangement (as in "झोल करना")
कीड़ा	kīṛā	Pest	कीड़ा (keeda)	A trouble or nuisance maker.
Fund / Pant		To steal, scam	चोरी (corī)	Generally refers to a small robbery.
रे, बंटाई	re, baṇṭāī	Hey!	हे (he)	Attention grabber in conversation with another.
कटिंग	kaṭiṅg	Half cup of Tea	आधी ग्लास चाय (ādhī glāsa cāya)	
डब्बा डालना	ḍabbā ḍālanā	to use the bathroom for pooping	टॉयलेट हो के आता हूँ (toilet hoke aata hun)	'I'm going to the toilet'.
मूत मारना, धार मारना	mūt mārnā, dhār mārnā	to go pee	मूत्र विसर्जन करना (mūtra visarjan karnā) पेशाब करना (peshāb karnā)	Literally give out urine.
घुंघरू सलमान	ghuṅgharū salamāna	Curly haired	घुंगराले बालवाला (ghuṅgarālē bālvālā)	घुंघरू (ghuṅgharū) refers to a curly haired guy.
ऑफ हो जाना, टपक जाना	ŏph ho jānā, ṭapaka jānā	To Die/ Died	मर गया (Mar gaya)	E.g.: Mera dost off ho gaya = My friend died.
खर्चा-पानी	kharcā-pānī	Bribe/Pocket Money and To beat	रिश्वत (riśvat) and मारना (mārnā)	E.g.: कोपचे में दूँ क्या खर्चा-पानी = Do you want me to beat you in a corner.
रापचिक	rāpcik	Looking Hot	सुन्दर (sundar)	E.g.: Aaj bahut Rapchik lag rahi hai tu
चाप्टर	chaaptar	Cunning / Shrewd	चालाक	E.g. बहुत चैप्टर हैं वो, उसे कम मत समझो. He is quite cunning. Do not underestimate him.
हटेला	haṭēlā	Highly Stubborn	हठी, अड़ियल (अगर जिद पर आ गया तो कुछ भी कर डालेगा) उससे पंगा मत लो, हटेला है वो. Don't take issues with him; he is quite stubborn and can lose his balance.	
पानचाट	pāncāṭ	useless, unworthy	फालतु, बकवास	From Marathi पाणचट (pāṇcaṭ) meaning "watered down" मेरा नया फोन एकदम पानचाट है.
हफ्ता	haphtā	protection money, bribe	रिश्वत (riśvat), घूस (ghūs), रंगदारी(raṅgdārī)	Literally means a week, denoting protection money to be paid every week. Can also mean a one-time bribe.
बिंदास	bindaas	Relaxed, laid-back	निर्भय, निडर	बंदा बिंदास है भिडू. (That dude is chill man.)
भन्कस	bhankas	useless talk/activity	बेकार	From Marathi भंकस
पेहली फुर्सत में निकल	pehli fursat mein nikal	get out at first sight	तुरंत जाने को कहना	
कंटाल	Kantal	Bored	उबाऊ	from Marathi word कंटळा(kanṭal̤ā) meaning boredom

== See also ==
- Tapori (word)
