= Laxman Gole =

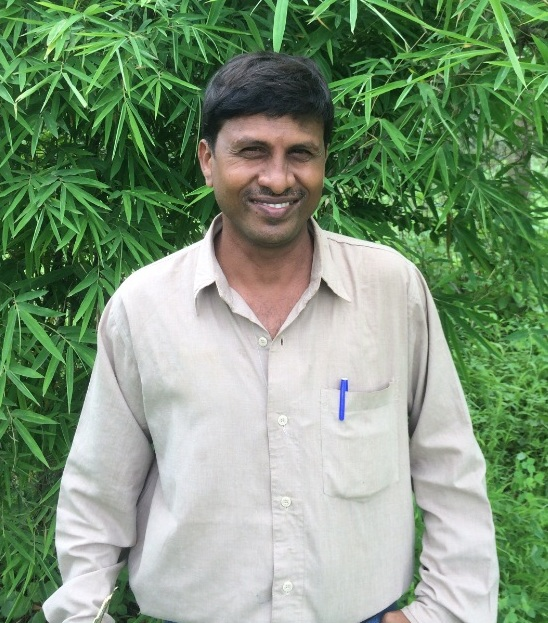
Laxman Gole

Laxman Gole is a contemporary Indian Gandhian who has been described as the real-life Munnabhai. He is the 2011 winner of the Zindagi Live National Award given by IBN-7. The 2015 Indian biographical Hindi film Laxman Gole is based on Gole's life and his journey. The film is written and directed by Faisal Hashmi. He is the subject of a documentary film by award-winning documentary filmmaker Madhavi Tangella. Prayaschit, Gunahon Ke Zakhm, a TV show on Sony Entertainment Television, hosted by Tisca Chopra had an episode based on his life.

== Conflict with the law ==
The time Gole spent in jail gave him a bad reputation and brought him in contact with criminals. He said, "To some extent I blame the police for making me a criminal." He spent over seven years in jail as an undertrial and prisoner for assault, attempt to murder and extortion, with 19 cases filed against him.

== Encounter with Gandhi's philosophy ==
While being held in Nashik jail under Maharashtra Control of Organised Crime Act Gole came across Gandhi's autobiography: The Story of My Experiments with Truth.

(A story in The Telegraph compares this with the incident in the film Lage Raho Munna Bhai in which Gandhi "appears" to the protagonist of the film, Munna Bhai.)

Reading the book made Gole realise the fruitlessness of violence, falsity, crime and hatred. He was impressed by Gandhi's courage in coming to terms with his mistakes and seeking forgiveness for them, to get on with life. Gole decided to plead guilty to the charges laid against him. He wrote a letter to the judge sitting over his case admitting the charges against him and expressed regret for them. The judge warned him that doing so could result in him being sent to prison for seven years, but Gole declared that he was prepared to bear whatever punishment he deserved. Gole also wrote letters to those he had hurt — apologising to them. Impressed by Gole's admission of his guilt and his desire for atoning for his wrongdoings, the judge gave him a sentence reduced to half. He was acquitted in 18 cases, sentenced for four years in one case and for two months in another. This sentence, too, was reduced to two years.

== After release from jail ==
After release from Nasik jail, Gole began working for the Bombay Sarvodaya Mandal, lecturing on Gandhian philosophy in Indian jails including Tihar jail. He has trained in computers and runs his own NGO: Saksham Peace Foundation.

== Personal life ==
Gole under the influence of Gandhian philosophy gave up consuming meat and alcohol. He is married and has two children.

== Popular culture ==
=== Biographical film ===
The 2015 Indian biographical Hindi film Laxman Gole is based on Gole's life and his journey. It is written and directed by Faisal Hashmi. Rohan Gujar plays the role of Laxman Gole. Other well-known actors like Sanjay Choudhary, Girish Jain, Kumkum Das play important roles.

=== Documentary ===
He is the subject of a film by award-winning documentary filmmaker Madhavi Tangella.
