= Munni Begum (disambiguation) =

Munni Begum may refer to:

- Munni Begum (born 1946), Pakistani ghazal and folk singer
- Munni Begum (noble) (1720–1813), second wife of the Nawab of Bengal, Mir Jafar

== See also ==
- Munna (disambiguation)
- "Munni Badnaam Hui", a 2010 song by Mamta Sharma and Aishwarya Nigam from the Indian film Dabangg
