= Munna =

Munna may refer to:

- Saint Munna, a 6th-century saint of the Roman Catholic church in Ireland, patron of two churches
- Munna (1954 film), an Indian Hindi-language film
- Munna (2007 film), an Indian Telugu-language film
- Munna (actor), Indian film actor
- Munna (Pokémon), a fictional species of Pokémon

== See also ==
- Munna Bhai (disambiguation)
- Munni Begum (disambiguation)
- "Munni Badnaam Hui", a 2010 song by Mamta Sharma and Aishwarya Nigam from the Indian film Dabangg
