= Munna Bhai (film series) =

Indian film series by Rajkumar Hirani

Munna Bhai film series
- Created by: Rajkumar Hirani
- Original work: Munna Bhai M.B.B.S (2003)
- Owner: Vinod Chopra Films

Films and television
- Films: Munna Bhai M.B.B.S (2003); Lage Raho Munna Bhai (2006)

Miscellaneous
- Portrayers: Sanjay Dutt; Arshad Warsi; Boman Irani; Jimmy Sheirgill

Munna Bhai is an Indian Hindi-language film series created, written and directed by Rajkumar Hirani and produced by Vidhu Vinod Chopra under the banner of Vinod Chopra Productions. It consists of Munna Bhai M.B.B.S., released in 2003, and Lage Raho Munna Bhai, released in 2006. The two films stars the same characters of Sanjay Dutt as Munna Bhai and Arshad Warsi as Circuit, with different plot elements and settings. Boman Irani and Jimmy Sheirgill feature in each film as different characters. Both of the films received widespread critical acclaim and became huge commercial successes.

== Films ==
=== Munna Bhai M.B.B.S. (2003) ===
Murli Prasad Sharma, nicknamed "Munna Bhai," is a good-hearted local gangster who engages in criminal activities. Munna Bhai pretends to be a doctor in order to impress his father, but after being revealed as a gangster to his father, who feels insulted, he decides to go to a medical college to obtain an M.B.B.S. degree to prove he can become a real doctor. The film follows Munna's extremely well-played struggle as he learns about the medical system and makes his way through the renowned medical college run by dean Dr. Asthana, the very man who insulted his father. He continues to cheat his way through college but changes over time while also instilling a more heartfelt and sensitive approach to patient care in the hospital.

=== Lage Raho Munna Bhai (2006) ===
In the second installment of the series, Munna Bhai poses as a professor of history in order to meet with a radio jockey whose voice he has fallen in love with. She asks him to give a lecture and questions on Mahatma Gandhi, and as a result, he becomes a proponent of Gandhism and uses it to solve modern-life problems of the people.

=== Sequels ===
In a February 2026 interview with Variety India, director Rajkumar Hirani said that he is still working on scripts for sequels for both 3 Idiots and Lage Raho Munna Bhai. Later that November, Farhad Samji was revealed to be writing a third Munna Bhai film.

== Cast and characters ==
Actor	Film	
Actor	Munna Bhai M.B.B.S. (2003)	Lage Raho Munna Bhai (2006)
Sanjay Dutt	Murli Prasad Sharma (Munna Bhai)	Murli Prasad Sharma (Munna Bhai)
Arshad Warsi	Sarkeshwar (Circuit)	Sarkeshwar (Circuit)
Gracy Singh	Dr. Suman Asthana (Chinki)	
Vidya Balan		Janvi
Boman Irani	Dr. J. C. Asthana	Lakhbir Singh (Lucky)
Sunil Dutt	Shri Hari Prasad Sharma	
Rohini Hattangadi	Parvati Sharma	
Dilip Prabhavalkar		Mohandas Karamchand Gandhi ("Bapu")
Dia Mirza		Simran Singh
Jimmy Shergill	Zaheer Khan	Victor D'Souza
Yatin Karyekar	Anand Banerjee	
Kurush Deboo	Dr. Rustom Pavri	Advocate Dhansukh Bhai Patel (Gujju)
Bomie E. Dotiwala	Rustom's father	Bomie Uncle
Supriya Shukla		Lucky's wife
Kulbhushan Kharbanda		Khurana
Abhishek Bachchan		Sunny Khurana
Saurabh Shukla		Batuk Maharaj
Priya Bapat	First year medical student (Cameo Appearance)	Girl in restaurant who calls Munna at his radio show (Cameo Appearance)
Nawazuddin Siddiqui	Pickpocket at railway station who tries to steal Hari's wallet (Cameo Appearance)	
Parikshit Sahni		A. L. D'Souza (Victor's father)
Rohitash Gaud	Coconut seller in park	Kuku (Lucky's sidekick)
Surendra Rajan	Maqsood Bhai (cleaner at the medical institute)	Hariram (librarian at the Gandhi library)

== Release and revenue ==
Film	Release date	Budget	Box office revenue
Munna Bhai M.B.B.S.	19 December 2003	₹100 million (US$1.0 million)	₹346 million (US$3.6 million)
Lage Raho Munna Bhai	1 September 2006	₹120 million (US$1.2 million)	₹1.27 billion (US$13 million)

== Awards ==
=== Munna Bhai M.B.B.S. ===
Munna Bhai M.B.B.S. was the recipient of a number of awards. At the 2004 Filmfare awards, it received the Filmfare Critics Award for Best Movie, the Filmfare Best Screenplay Award, the Filmfare Best Dialogue Award, and the Filmfare Best Comedian Award in addition to four other nominations. It won a number of awards at the 2004 Zee Cine Awards including Best Debuting Director, Zee Cine Award for Best Actor in a Comic Role, Best Cinematography, and Best Dialogue.

Other ceremonies include the 2004 National Film Awards, where it won the National Film Award for Best Popular Film, and the 2004 International Indian Film Academy Awards, where it won the IIFA Best Comedian Award.

=== Lage Raho Munna Bhai ===
Lage Raho Munna Bhai is the recipient of four National Film Awards in addition to other awards. Some speculated that it would represent India as an entry for the 2007 Academy Award for Best Foreign Film. Although ultimately losing to Rang De Basanti as India's official submission, the producers submitted it as an independent entry. However, neither film received an Oscar nomination.
