= Mahavatar Swami Bhai =

Argentine spiritual teacher and yogi

Swami Mahavatar Swami Bhai
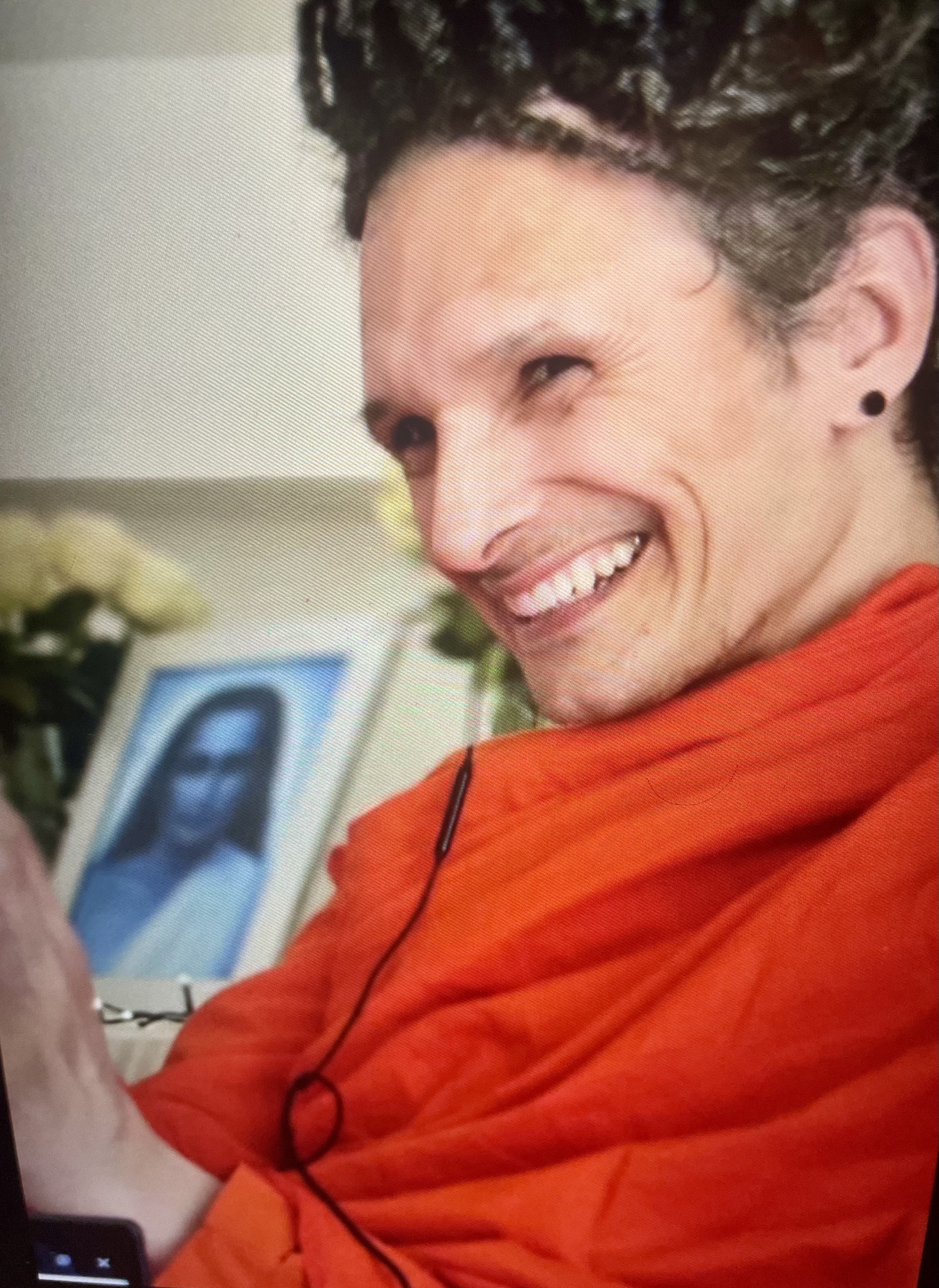
- Born: Mar del Plata, Argentina
- Occupations: Spiritual teacher, Yogi
- Website: Official website

Mahavatar Sri Bhai Guruji, also known as Víctor Truviano, is an Argentine spiritual teacher and yogi. Truviano claims he lives without consuming food or liquids since 2007.

== Early life ==
Bhai Guruji was born in Argentina and has been described in press reports as a violinist who performed from a young age.

== Teachings and public profile ==
Bhai Guruji's public activities have been reported in relation to prana, yoga, meditation, and spiritual practice. In 2023, OneIndia Kannada reported that he visited the Panchamasali Peetha in Davangere, participated in Ishtalinga meditation with Vachanananda Swami, and discussed yoga with him. Vijaya Karnataka described him as an Argentine yogi and quoted him as saying that he had overcome hunger through yoga.

He is also known for claims that he has lived without food since 2006 and without liquids since 2007, sustaining himself through prana. El País reported that medical experts said long-term survival without food or water is biologically impossible.

== Media coverage ==
Bhai Guruji's claims and public appearances have been covered by media outlets in multiple countries. In 2019, the Spanish television programme La vida con Samanta on Cuatro featured his claims of prolonged fasting. In 2023, the Indian newspaper Vijaya Karnataka reported on him, including his assertion that he had lived without food or water for more than 17 years. Such coverage reflects public interest in his claims and teachings, but does not constitute scientific verification. The Uruguayan newspaper El País reported that medical experts said long-term survival without food or water is biologically impossible.

== Publications ==
- Tiburcio, Vicente; Truviano, Víctor (15 April 2019). El estado de Babaji: Tú, yogui (in Spanish). Letrame. ISBN 9788417864965.
