= Tapori (word) =

Hindi language word

Tapori literally translates into vagabond or rowdy in Hindi. Street thugs in Mumbai were perhaps the most notable taporis. Their unique style of speaking Hindi was called tapori language. They also had a unique style of dressing, which they called as tapori style. Tapori culture, though resented by many, is widely imitated by many as humorous or comical. It has found acceptance in Bollywood films including "Rangeela," "Gol Mal," "Munna Bhai," and "Chashme Buddoor".

Their style of speaking Hindustani is a mixture of many languages spoken by people in Mumbai. It has words adapted mainly from Marathi, and some from Konkani and Gujarati.

Tapori is an original Marathi word meaning "blossomed", fully fertile or at its peak in growth, which during its evolution/progression (towards the dark side) in the Marathi language started as its application to someone with high youth elements or budding hormones and subsequent behaviour of that animal/humans to establish control, create mischief, attractthe attention of the opposite gender and other such indulgences. Bollywood being in Maharashtra (a Marathi-speaking state), it inherited that word into its Hindi vocabulary as a "cool-happening" style statement; all such similar words from Marathi used to be recognised in Marathi as Tapori language (i.e. words which were considered "not decent" to use in regular language and are mostly used by people who are deemed anti-social or with similar stature). All such words in Marathi got imported as-is into Bambaiya Hindi with additions from other local languages.

Changing social conditions in India have led to a shortage of work for educated lower middle-class young men. The rise of this archetype in Indian cinema in the 1990s and 2000s coincides with the real-life social phenomenon.

The children's network of ATD Fourth World is named Tapori. ATD's founder Joseph Wresinski met a group of children living in Mumbai train stations known as 'Tapori'. Wresinski noticed how these children shared among themselves what food they had. He was so moved that he decided to call ATD's children's network Tapori.

== See also ==
- Tapori (film)
- Bangalore Kannada
- Chennai Tamil
- Bombay Hindi
