= Vachananand =

Indian yogi and activist

Shwaasa Guru Vachanananda Swamiji
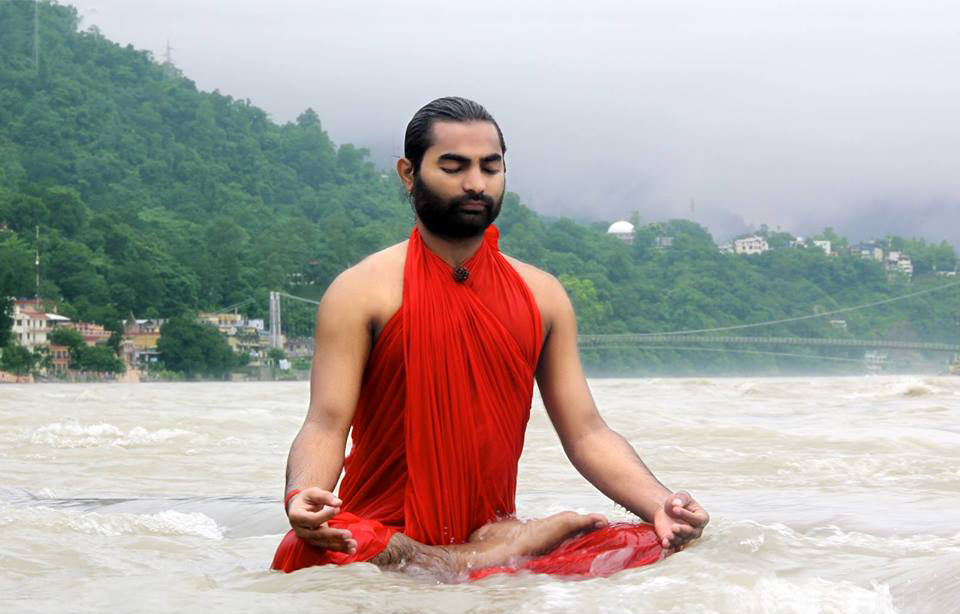
- Shwaasaguru at Ganges River
- Born: Athani, Karnataka

Swami Vachanananda Guru, commonly known as Shwaasa Guru, is a yogi, social activist, philanthropist from Karnataka, India. He took sannyasa while very young. He founded Shwaasa, a non-profit organization which offers yoga programs in India and around the world. The foundation conducts yoga camps and is involved in various social and community development activities creating health awareness among people irrespective of age, religion, language, and cast.

== Early life ==
He was born in a small village, Tanvashi (Athani Taluk, Belagavi District, and Karnataka State, India). At the age of eight he was sent to his Guru Sri Marulashankara Shivayogi's monastery where he studied Yoga, Sanskrit, philosophy and ancient Indian scriptures along with conventional academics under different Gurus and teachers. After completing his studies he went to the Himalayas to do austere practice of yoga and followed the path of Ashtanga Yoga as laid by sage Patanjali. He says that people are worried and concerned about their mind and body but very few take into account their breath. This is the technique he teaches and professes through his organization, Shwaasa.

== Work ==
He founded Shwaasa Yoga center in 2012. In 2009 TV9 began featuring him in morning yoga slot in “Yoga Yoga” program. He advocates a disease free society in which his organization Shwaasa is meant to take a predominant role. He claims to have understood the needs of the modern times and has been conducting Yoga courses for all sections of the society and for all age groups.

He is interested in social services where he intends to bring happiness through practice of Yoga. He professes "Yoga Yukta-Roga Mukta" which means one will be free of diseases if one is associated with the practice of yoga.

On 21 June 2015 International Yoga day was celebrated in Karnataka and the chief Minister invited him to conduct mass Yoga programmes at Kanteerava stadium where 10,000 participants performed yoga including actress Shilpa Shetty and other well-known Kannada film personalities. This Yoga event has got an enthusiastic response in Karnataka.

He is popularizing Indian alternative medicine practice of Ayurveda. His organization aims to bring a balance between the mind - body – spirit through the ancient practices of Vedic techniques.

He has conducted thousands of innovative and specialized yoga events. He has been conducting corporate yoga, yoga for ministers and MLAs, yoga for Cardiologists, yoga Training for Advocates and Judges, yoga Training for Film stars, Yoga Training for Media Persons, Yoga Training for children and youth across India and abroad, yoga training for HIV+ children (Joint venture with Samvedana institute), yoga education for Prisoners (Bijapur Central Jail), yoga education for police personnel in Bangalore city, yoga awareness campaigns across India, National Integration Yoga Training at temples, mosques and churches, Free Yoga Science Camps (State, National and International), Yoga for Women (Across Karnataka and other States), Lifestyle Training for NRIs, foreigners and citizens of India.

== Jagadguru ==
Located at Harihara-Davangere, Veerashaiva Lingayatha Panchamasali Jagadguru Peetha was established in 2008 by Panchamasali Samaj and was headed by Sri Sri Dr Mahantha Swamiji. After the untimely death of Mahantha Swamiji, there was no leader to manage the Peetha. Shwaasa Guru Sri Vachanand Swamiji was given Deeksha according to Veerashaiva tradition and became the new pontiff of the Harihara Panchamasali Mutt on 20 April 2018. After his coronation Jagadguru Sri Sri Vachananand Swamiji expressed his views on fostering health in society through Ayurveda, Naturopathy and Yoga Studio at the Peetha.

== Controversies ==
During a convention in Harihar, with the chief minister B. S. Yediyurappa as the chief guest, Swami brought in words by lobbying the chief minister to induct Murugesh Nirani into his cabinet. Swami literally threatened Yediyurappa that the whole community would renounce the support if he failed to do so. Swami said "Murugesh Nirani has stood with you like a rock. Induct him into the cabinet, otherwise the Panchamsali Lingayats will abandon their support to you."

This led to an immediate reaction from Yediyurappa, where he stood up and requested to maintain the seer's responsibility in his speech and use of words. The chief minister also clarified that advice from the seer is most welcome, whereas threatening is unacceptable. He also said that he would tender his resignation if there was pressure from others in the cabinet expansion. The actions of Swamiji also witnessed wide criticism from the public, seer community and politicians. After which Vachanananda Swamy sought forgiveness in his speech from Yediyurappa.

== Other noted activities ==
- 'YogaYoga' Program aired on TV9 (Kannada)News Channel.
- Yoga Programmes on 'SriSankara' TV Channel.
- Yoga Coach for Celebrity Cricket League's Karnataka Bulldozers Team
- Columns and articles Published in Vijaya vani, Kannada Prabha and Bodhivruksha which is supplementary of Vijaya Karnataka Newspaper
- Written Columns for 'Yuva Karnataka' (Monthly magazine run by Youth and Sports Department of state Government, Karnataka)
- Kengulabi Movie Launch
- He was forefront force of agitation demanding securing the 2A reservation To Panchamasalis
- In his Leadership a new Veerashaiva Lingayat Panchamasali Jagadguru Peetha established in Alagur village of Jamakhandi Taluk in Bagalkot District
