= Boman Irani =

Indian actor, producer, filmmaker, voice artist and photographer (born 1959)

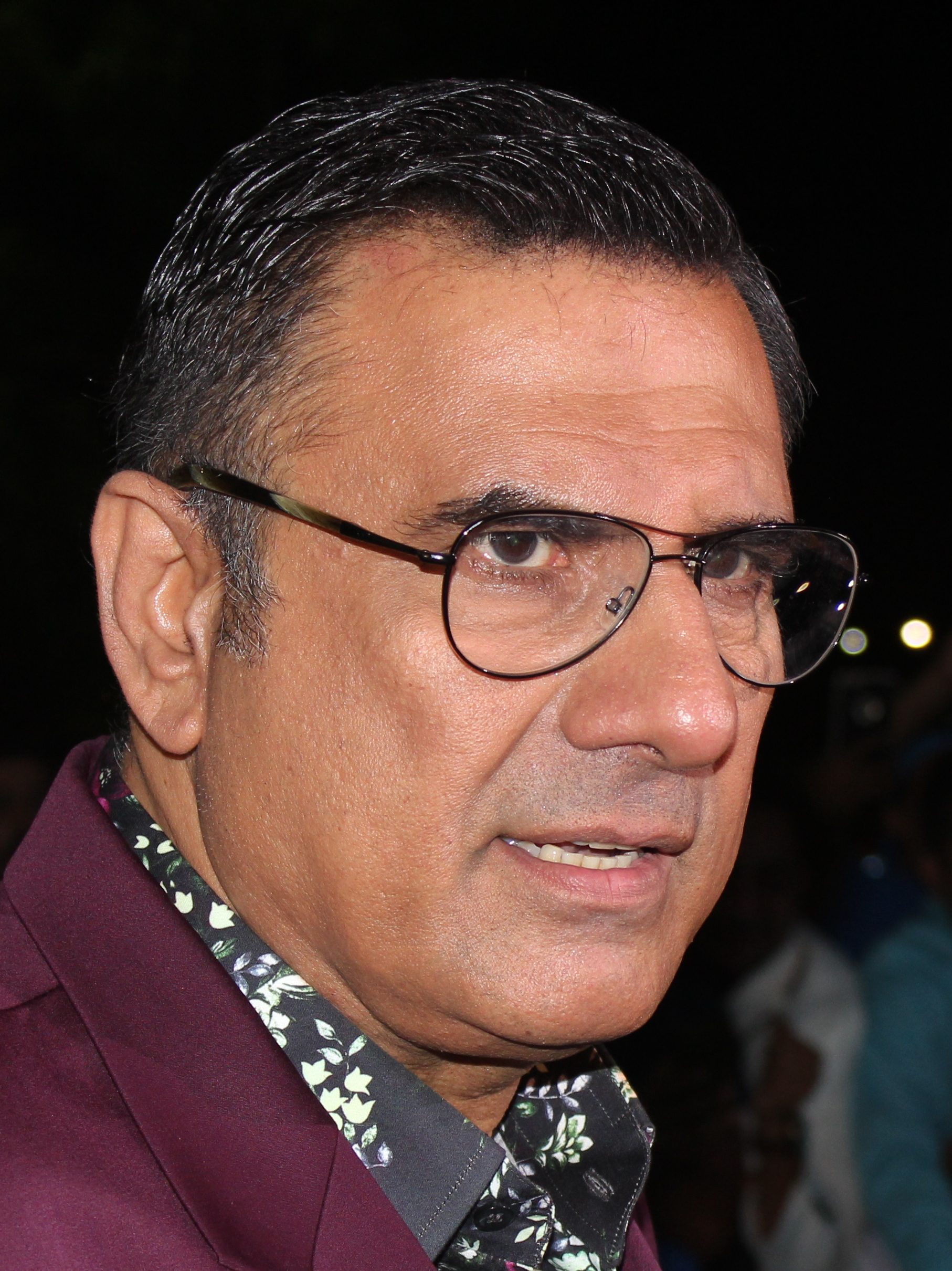
- Irani in 2017
- Born: 2 December 1959 (age 66); Mumbai, Maharashtra, India
- Occupation: Actor
- Years active: 1977–present (general career); 1981–2001 (off-stage career); 2001–present (on-stage career)
- Organization: Irani Moviestone
- Spouse: Zenobia Irani (m. 1985)
- Children: 2, including Kayoze Irani

Boman Irani (born 2 December 1959) is an Indian actor and comedian who works primarily in Hindi-language films. He has featured in over 100 films, and is the recipient of a Filmfare Award and two IIFA Awards.

Some of his notable works include Munna Bhai MBBS (2003), Veer-Zaara, Main Hoon Na, Lakshya (all 2004), No Entry (2005), Lage Raho Munna Bhai, Don (both 2006), Khosla Ka Ghosla (2006), Heyy Babyy (2007), Dostana (2008), 3 Idiots (2009), Housefull (2010), Don 2 (2011), Housefull 2, Cocktail (both 2012), Jolly LLB (2013), PK, Happy New Year (both 2014), Dilwale (2015), Housefull 3 (2016), Sanju (2018), Total Dhamaal (2019), 83 (2021), Uunchai (2022) and Dunki (2023). He made his directorial debut with the self-starring drama The Mehta Boys (2025).

== Early life ==
Irani was born on 2 December 1959, in Mumbai to an Irani Zoroastrian family. His father died 6 months before Irani was born. He has 3 elder sisters: Shirin, Shenaz, and Roshan. Irani grew up with dyslexia in his childhood, which he eventually overcame.

He finished his secondary schooling at St. Mary's School, after which he undertook a 2-year waiter course at Mithibai College in Mumbai. Irani also managed a bakery and namkeen shop in Mumbai that was run by his mother, Jerbanoo. She died in June 2021 at 94.

== Career ==
=== Photography career ===
While working at the Taj Mahal Palace Hotel, he took photos of school cricket and football matches and sold them for 20 to 30 rupees, which he continued to do up until his marriage. Irani continued to work as a photographer, and asked the then President of the Indian Boxing Association, Aspy Adajania if he could become the photographer for the World Boxing Championships in Mumbai. When Adajania initially rejected him, Irani agreed to work at his office in-return to cover the event. He continued to cover other state boxing matches, until he was finally appointed by Adajania as the official photographer for the Indian Boxing Association.

Irani would also go on to become the photographer for the Norwegian Boxing Team and photograph specific photos that were needed of Norwegian boxer, Ole Klemetsen. Irani took the photos with his Pentax K1000 camera.

=== Theatrical career (1981–1983) ===
During his school days, Irani had a passion for acting, where he trained under acting coach Hansraj Siddhia from 1981 to 1983.

Irani was mentored by actor Alyque Padamsee. Irani appeared in many theater plays such as Roshni, at the Regional Theater in Versova. He also acted in many TV serials such as Family Ties and Mahatma vs Gandhi, playing Gandhi after the role was turned down by actor Darshan Jariwala.

=== Film career (2000–present) ===
Irani moved to on-screen acting in 2000. He appeared in a number of commercials for Fanta, Ambuja Cements and CEAT Limited.

His small but significant role in Darna Mana Hai earned him critical acclaim. The film was declared a hit, and he was seen in a segment featuring Saif Ali Khan. Irani gained attention for his role in the 2003 comedy Munna Bhai M.B.B.S.. His role as J. Asthana earned him a nomination for the Filmfare Award for Best Performance in a Comic Role. He would go on to star in its sequel Lage Raho Munna Bhai for which he received several IIFA award nominations. He also starred in the comedy-drama 3 Idiots opposite Aamir Khan which earned him the Filmfare Award for Best Supporting Actor and the Screen Award for Best Actor in a Negative Role.

In addition to acting, Irani has hosted the IIFA Awards on various occasions. He also hosted the quiz show Bollywood Ka Boss. He has also appeared in Kaun Banega Crorepati with Sanjay Dutt, and has featured in various commercials.

He launched his production house Irani Movietone in January 2019. In the same year, Irani played the role of Dr. Balraj Kapoor in the web series Masoom.

Boman Irani is also a brand ambassador for Puri Oil, Exotica, Kent RO, Ahead NGO, and Saffola. He is also on the Board of Advisors of India's International Movement to Unite Nations (I.I.M.U.N.).

=== Other works ===
He provided the voice of J. R. D. Tata in the audiobook of his biography by Charkha Audiobooks, Beyond the Last Blue Mountain written by R. M. Lala, alongside Shernaz Patel as narrator.

== Ventures ==
=== Irani Movietone ===
Founded by Boman Irani in 2019, Irani Movietone is a film production cum creative house that specialises in providing advertising and branding solutions in all media formats. Sugar Cosmetics, JSW One, PMark Mustard Oil and Quench Botanics are some of the notable clients who advertising with Irani Movietone.

'The Mehta Boys' is its first feature film production directed by Boman Irani and written by Alexander Dinelaris and Boman Irani. The film has been released on Amazon Prime Video.

=== Spiral Bound ===
In 2020, Irani began a masterclass named Spiral Bound with the aim of uniting amateur and professional screenwriters. Screenwriter Alexander Dinelaris conducted the first workshop of Spiral Bound. The masterclass continued in online sessions during the COVID-19 pandemic. Guest speakers included playwright Anosh Irani and directors Rajkumar Hirani, Ram Madhvani, and Shakun Batra. Spiral Bound has completed more than 500 sessions.

== Filmography ==
Key
†	Denotes films that have not yet been released

=== As actor ===
Key
†	Denotes films that have not yet been released

Year	Film	Role	Notes
2001	Everybody Says I'm Fine!	Mr. Mittal	
2002	Let's Talk	Nikhil Sharma	
2003	Darna Mana Hai	Hotel Owner	Segment: No Smoking
2003	Boom	Diamond Dealer	
2003	Munna Bhai M.B.B.S.	Dr. Jagdish Chandra "JC" Asthana	
2004	Main Hoon Na	Principal Yogesh Agarwal	
2004	Lakshya	Sanjeev Shergill	
2004	Veer-Zaara	Jahangir Hayaat Khan	
2005	Page 3	Deepak Suri	
2005	Waqt: The Race Against Time	Natham "Nattu" Singh	
2005	My Wife's Murder	Inspector Tejpal Randhawa	
2005	No Entry	Minister Pranab Kumar "PK" Gupta	
2005	Maine Gandhi Ko Nahin Mara	Public Prosecutor Avinash Roy	
2005	Home Delivery: Aapko... Ghar Tak	Michael Burnett / Santa Claus	
2005	Kal: Yesterday and Tomorrow	Yashwant Dayal Singh	
2005	Bluffmaster	Dr. Vijay Bhalerao	
2005	Mr Prime Minister	Member of Parliament	
2005	Being Cyrus	Farokh Sethna	English film
2006	Shaadi Se Pehle	Dr. Rustam Ali	
2006	Pyare Mohan	Tony Dholakia	
2006	Yun Hota To Kya Hota	DCP Amarkant Chauhan	
2006	Lage Raho Munna Bhai	Lakhbir "Lucky" Singh	
2006	Khosla Ka Ghosla	Kishan Khurana	
2006	Don – The Chase Begins Again	P De Silva	
2007	Eklavya: The Royal Guard	Rana Jayavardhan Singh	
2007	Honeymoon Travels Pvt. Ltd.	Oscar Fernandes	
2007	Heyy Babyy	Bharat Sahni	
2007	Dhan Dhana Dhan Goal	Tony Singh	
2008	Love Story 2050	Professor Yatin Khanna	
2008	Kismat Konnection	Rajiv Batra	
2008	Dostana	Murali "M" Lokhande	
2008	Yuvvraaj	Dr. Pravin Kant "PK" Banton	
2008	Sorry Bhai!	Naveen Mathur	
2008	Maharathi	Avvaldas "AD" Merchant	
2009	Luck by Chance	Deenaz Aziz	
2009	Little Zizou	Boman Pressvala	
2009	99	Rahul Mehrotra	
2009	Kambakkht Ishq	Dr. Sachin Mishra	Cameo appearance
2009	Perfect Mismatch	Naresh Patel	
2009	Fruit and Nut	Maharaja Harry Holkar	
2009	3 Idiots	Dr. Viru "Virus" Sahastrabuddhe	
2010	Well Done Abba	Arman/Rahman Ali	
2010	Hum Tum Aur Ghost	Virendra Kapoor	
2010	Mirch	Ashmit "Aasu" Hotmal	
2010	Jaane Kahan Se Aayi Hai	Ali	
2010	Housefull	Batook Patel	
2011	F.A.L.T.U	Principal Karam Sharma	
2011	Game	Om Prakash "OP" Ramsay	
2011	Love Breakups Zindagi	Ranveer	
2011	Don 2: The King is Back	Vardhan Makhija	
2012	Ek Main Aur Ekk Tu	Sushil Kapoor	
2012	Housefull 2	Batook Patel	
2012	Tezz	Sanjay Raina	
2012	Ferrari Ki Sawaari	Behram Ardeshir Deboo	
2012	Cocktail	Randhir "Randy" Kapoor	
2012	Shirin Farhad Ki Toh Nikal Padi	Farhad Ahmed	
2012	Student of the Year	Harikishan Sanon	Special appearance
2013	Jolly LLB	Advocate Tejinder Rajpal	
2013	Attarintiki Daredi	Raghunath "Raghu" Nandan	Telugu film
2014	Youngistaan	PM Dashrath Kaul	Cameo appearance
2014	Bhoothnath Returns	Bhushan Sharma / Bhausaheb	
2014	Happy New Year	Tehamton "Tammy" Irani	
2014	PK	Cherry Bajwa	
2015	Bengal Tiger	CM Ashok Gajapathi	Telugu film
2015	Dilwale	King	
2016	Santa Banta Pvt Ltd	Santeshwar Singh Solaid / Santa	
2016	Housefull 3	Batook Patel	
2016	The Legend of Michael Mishra	Full Pant (HP) / Older Half Pant	Cameo appearance
2016	Ventilator	Dr. Sairam Sukhranjan	Marathi film
2017	FU: Friendship Unlimited	Bulmukand	
2018	Agnyaathavaasi	Govind "Vinda" Bhargav	Telugu film
2018	Naa Peru Surya	Colonel Sanjay Shrivastav	Telugu film
2018	Parmanu: The Story of Pokhran	Himanshu Shukla	
2018	Sanju	Captain Homi Irani / Dr. Jagadish Chandra Asthana (archive footage from Munna Bhai MBBS)	Cameo appearance
2018	Welcome to New York	Gurwinder "Garry" Sandhu	
2018	Khajoor Pe Atke	Abhishek Zaveri	
2019	Total Dhamaal	Commissioner Shamsher "Don" Singh	
2019	PM Narendra Modi	Ratan Tata	
2019	Jhalki	Kailash Satyarthi	
2019	Kaappaan	Rajan Mahadev	Tamil film
2019	Made in China	Dr. Shankar Vardhi	
2019	Drive	Irfan Ali Mohammed	
2020	Yeh Ballet	Himself	
2020	Maska	Himself	
2021	83	Farokh Engineer	
2022	Runway 34	Nishant Suri	
2022	Jayeshbhai Jordaar	Samarth Parekh	
2022	Naam Tha Kanhaiyalal	Himself	Documentary
2022	Uunchai	Javed Siddiqui	
2023	Dunki	Geetendar "Geetu" Gulati	
2025	The Mehta Boys	Mr. Shiv Mehta	Also director
2025	Detective Sherdil	Pankaj Bhatti	
2025	Sarzameen	Lt. General I. S Kanwar	
2025	Tanvi the Great	Raja Sahab	
2026	The RajaSaab	Dr. Padmabhushan	Telugu film
2026	Raja Shivaji	Peer Baba	Marathi-Hindi bilingual film
2026	Peddi	Kiran Singh Baiswal	Telugu film
2026	Haiwaan	Judge Pradhan	Hindi
2026	Last Man in Tower	Dharmen Shah	
2027	Khosla Ka Ghosla 2 †	Kishan Khurana	

=== Television ===
Year	Title	Role	Notes
2017	Sabse Bada Kalakar	Judge	
2021	LOL: Hasse Toh Phasee	Host/presenter	
2025	Hai Junoon!	Professor Iyer	
2026	Pritam and Pedro	Professor Fonseca	Guest

== Awards and nominations ==
Year	Award Show	Category	Film	Outcome
2004	Filmfare Awards	Best Comedian	Main Hoon Na	Nominated
2004	Filmfare Awards	Best Comedian	Munnabhai M.B.B.S.	Nominated
2004	IIFA Awards	Best Actor in a Comic Role	Munnabhai M.B.B.S.	Won
2004	Screen Awards	Best Comedian	Munnabhai M.B.B.S.	Won
2004	Zee Cine Awards	Best Actor in a Comic Role	Munnabhai M.B.B.S.	Nominated
2006	IIFA Awards	Best Performance in a Comic Role	Waqt: The Race Against Time	Nominated
2007	Filmfare Awards	Best Villain	Lage Raho Munnabhai	Nominated
2007	IIFA Awards	Best Performance in a Negative Role	Lage Raho Munnabhai	Nominated
2007	Global Indian Film Awards	Best Actor in A Comic Role	Lage Raho Munnabhai	Nominated
2007	Stardust Awards	Best Performance in a Negative Role	Lage Raho Munnabhai	Nominated
2008	Producers Guild Film Awards	Best Actor in a Comic Role	Dostana	Nominated
2010	Filmfare Awards	Best Supporting Actor	3 Idiots	Won
2010	Screen Awards	Best Villain	3 Idiots	Won
2010	IIFA Awards	Best Performance in a Negative Role	3 Idiots	Won
2011	Zee Cine Awards	Best Actor in a Comic Role	Well Done Abba	Won
2012	IIFA Awards	Best Performance in a Negative Role	Don 2	Nominated
2014	Stardust Awards	Best Supporting Actor	Happy New Year	Nominated
2014	Bollywood Hungama Surfers' Choice Movie Awards	Best Comedian	PK	Nominated
