= IIFA Award for Best Performance in a Comic Role =

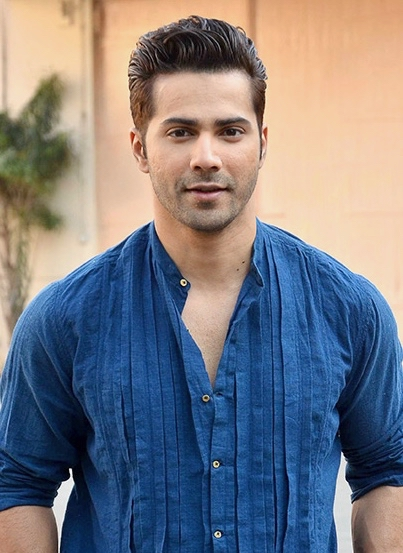
Varun Dhawan

The IIFA Best Comedian Award is chosen via a worldwide poll and the winner is announced at the ceremony.

== Multiple wins ==
Wins	Recipient
2	Govinda, Abhishek Bachchan, Varun Dhawan

== Awards ==
The winners are listed below:

Year	Winner	Character Name	Film
2000	Anil Kapoor	Lakhan Singh Khurana	Biwi No.1
2001	Paresh Rawal	Baburao Ganpatrao Apte (Babu Bhaiya)	Hera Pheri
2002	Govinda	Veer Sahay (Veeru)	Jodi No. 1
2003	Mahesh Manjrekar	Raja "Bali" Yadav	Kaante
2004	Boman Irani	Dr. JC Asthana	Munnabhai M.B.B.S.
2005	Akshay Kumar	Arun Khanna/Sunny	Mujhse Shaadi Karogi
2006	Jaaved Jaffrey	Jaggu Yadav aka Crocodile Dundee	Salaam Namaste
2007	Tusshar Kapoor	Lucky	Golmaal
2008	Govinda	Bhaskar Diwakar Chaudhary	Partner
2009	Abhishek Bachchan	Sameer "Sam" Acharya	Dostana
2010	Sanjay Dutt	Dharam Kapoor	All the Best: Fun Begins
2011	Riteish Deshmukh	Babu Rao "Bob"	Housefull
2012	Riteish Deshmukh	Deshbandhu Lallan Roy/Lee/Tukya/Heera Bhai	Double Dhamaal
2013	Abhishek Bachchan	Abbas Ali/Abhishek Bachchan	Bol Bachchan
2014	Arshad Warsi	Advocate Jagdish Tyagi a.k.a. Jolly	Jolly LLB
2015	Varun Dhawan	Sreenath Prasad aka "Seenu"	Main Tera Hero
2016	Deepak Dobriyal	Pappi Kutti	Tanu Weds Manu Returns
2017	Varun Dhawan	Junaid "J" Ansari	Dishoom

== See also ==
- IIFA Awards
- Bollywood
- Cinema of India
