= Munna Bhai =

Fictional character created by Rajkumar Hirani

- Munnabhai series character
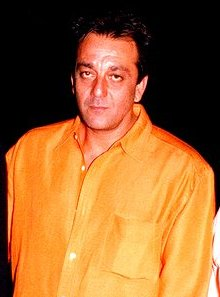
- Portrayed by Sanjay Dutt
- First appearance: Munna Bhai M.B.B.S.
- Last appearance: Lage Raho Munna Bhai
- Created by: Rajkumar Hirani
- Portrayed by: Sanjay Dutt

In-universe information
- Full name: Murli Prasad Sharma
- Gender: Male
- Title: Munna Bhai
- Occupation: Organized crime Fake medical student (1st film); Fake professor (2nd film)
- Family: Shri Hari Prasad Sharma (father); Parvati Sharma (mother); Sarkeshwar "Circuit" (friend)
- Spouse: Dr. Suman "Chinki" Asthana (1st film); Janvi (2nd film)
- Children: 2, with Suman (1st film)
- Religion: Hindu
- Nationality: Indian

Murli Prasad Sharma, better known as Munna Bhai, is an Indian fictional character who appears in the Munna Bhai film series. The character is created by Rajkumar Hirani and portrayed by Sanjay Dutt.

== Films overview ==
Murli Prasad Sharma (portrayed by Sanjay Dutt) is a leader in the Mumbai underworld. His nickname Munna Bhai has a double meaning; bhai literally means [brother], but in Mumbai slang it has also come to mean a hoodlum. His sidekick is Circuit (portrayed by Arshad Warsi). They both speak in Bambaiya Hindi, a dialect specific to Mumbai, India.

=== Munnabhai M.B.B.S. ===
Munna Bhai was first introduced in the 2003 film Munna Bhai M.B.B.S. which involves his adventures as a faux medical student, who finally tells the truth about himself and learns to help people along the way.

=== Lage Raho Munna Bhai ===
In the second movie, Lage Raho Munna Bhai, Munna Bhai becomes a faux professor. He begins to have visions of Mahatma Gandhi who persuades him to stop pretending he is a professor and teaches him to help other people solve their problems through Gandhism, which Munna Bhai terms Gandhigiri.

== TV commercials ==
A television commercial named "Munna Bhai fight against dengue" made by the Minister of Health and Family Welfare (India) in 2016 features 'Munna Bhai' and 'Circuit'. It was made to create awareness of dengue fever. Dutt reprised his role of Munna Bhai in several Acko commercials.

== Popularity ==
The character Munna Bhai was counted as one of top 20 fictional characters in Bollywood. The film Lage Raho Munna Bhai popularised the term Gandhigiri.

== See also ==
- Laxman Gole a contemporary Indian Gandhian who has been described as the real-life Munnabhai.
