= Munna Bhai M.B.B.S. =

2003 Indian film by Rajkumar Hirani

- Theatrical release poster
- Directed by: Rajkumar Hirani
- Screenplay by: Rajkumar Hirani; Vidhu Vinod Chopra; Lajan Joseph
- Dialogues by: Abbas Tyrewala
- Story by: Rajkumar Hirani
- Produced by: Vidhu Vinod Chopra
- Starring: Sunil Dutt; Sanjay Dutt; Gracy Singh; Arshad Warsi; Boman Irani; Jimmy Sheirgill; Rohini Hattangadi
- Cinematography: Binod Pradhan
- Edited by: Pradeep Sarkar; Rajkumar Hirani
- Music by: Score: Sanjay Wandrekar; Songs: Anu Malik
- Production companies: Entertainment One; Vinod Chopra Films
- Distributed by: AA Films
- Release date: 18 December 2003 (India)
- Running time: 157 minutes
- Country: India
- Language: Hindi
- Budget: ₹10-12 crores
- Box office: est. ₹33 crores

Munna Bhai M.B.B.S. (translation: Munna brother M.B.B.S.) is a 2003 Indian Hindi-language comedy drama film written and directed by Rajkumar Hirani in his directorial debut and produced by Vidhu Vinod Chopra under the banner Vinod Chopra Films. It features Sunil Dutt in his final film appearance as the father to his real-life son, Sanjay Dutt, who stars as the titular character. Gracy Singh, Arshad Warsi, Boman Irani, Jimmy Sheirgill and Rohini Hattangadi play other roles.

The first installment of the Munna Bhai film series, the film follows Munna Bhai, a don in the Mumbai underworld, trying to please his father by pretending to be a doctor, but when a doctor, Asthana (Irani), exposes his lies and tarnishes his father's honor, Munna enrolls in a medical college. Chaos ensues when Munna, upon finding that Asthana is the dean of the college, vows revenge, while also sparking a romance with a house doctor, Suman (Singh), unaware that she is his childhood friend and Asthana's daughter.

Released on 18 December 2003, the film was a major critical and commercial success, and went on to win the 2004 National Film Award for Best Popular Film, and several Filmfare Awards, including the Best Film (Critics) and Best Screenplay. At the box office, it achieved a silver jubilee status (25-week run) being one of only eight Hindi films to have achieved this status since the year 2000. In its 26th week of release, the film could still be found playing on 300 screens throughout India. The film's release was also accompanied by a mobile video game based on the film by Indiagames. It was later followed with a sequel in 2006, Lage Raho Munna Bhai, with a third film currently in development as of 2025.

== Plot ==
Murli Prasad Sharma, aka Munna Bhai, runs an extortion and kidnapping syndicate in Mumbai with his loyal lieutenant, Circuit. To please his idealistic parents, Hari Prasad and Parvati, he pretends to be a doctor and transforms his criminal headquarters into a fully staffed charitable hospital during their visits. The deception unravels when Hari encounters his old acquaintance, Dr. Jagdish Chandra Asthana. Hari proposes a marriage between Munna and Asthana's daughter, Dr. Suman "Chinki", but Asthana discovers Munna's criminal activities and publicly humiliates his parents. They leave the city in shame, and Munna vows to seek revenge by becoming an actual doctor. He blackmails a faculty member of Asthana's medical college into helping him cheat on the entrance examination, and gains admission.

Munna's empathetic, unconventional approach immediately clashes with Asthana's rigid teaching methods, which emphasize clinical detachment over compassion. With Circuit's help outside campus, Munna challenges the hospital's impersonal treatment of patients, particularly those considered incurable. His unconventional interventions win the loyalty of staff, students, and patients, while Asthana struggles to expel him without proof of his admission fraud.

Unaware that Suman is his childhood acquaintance, Chinki, Munna grows close to her as she observes his emotional intelligence and compassionate nature. He helps a suicidal young man find purpose, lifts a depressed elderly patient's spirits, and restores the dignity of an underappreciated janitor. Munna also provides unconventional palliative care to Zaheer, a patient with terminal stomach cancer, forming a close friendship with him during his final days.

Asthana attempts to expel Munna after a disruptive entertainment incident in the hospital wards, but the united opposition of staff, students, and patients frustrates his efforts. He then orders Munna to defend his continued enrollment in a rigorous oral examination before the entire college. Grief-stricken by Zaheer's sudden death the previous night, Munna loses heart, abandons the examination midway, confesses his criminal past, and leaves the institution.

Soon afterward, Anand Banerjee, a paraplegic patient who has remained in a vegetative state for twelve years, spontaneously regains consciousness following Munna's persistent sensory stimulation. Suman publicly defends Munna's humanistic approach, using Anand's recovery to challenge Asthana's rigid ideology. Humbled by the events, Asthana concedes the value of Munna's methods.

After learning of Munna's therapeutic impact, his parents reconcile with him. Munna marries Suman and establishes a legitimate community clinic in his native village. A year later, Circuit marries and starts a family, while Asthana resigns as dean to practice medicine according to Munna's compassionate principles. His progressive colleague, Dr. Rustom Pavri, succeeds him as head of the college. Meanwhile, a fully recovered Anand recounts the events to children at the hospital before preparing to return home, carrying fond memories of Munna.

== Cast ==
- Sanjay Dutt as Murli Prasad Sharma a.k.a. Munna Bhai, a gangster and medical student
- Arshad Warsi as Sarkeshwar a.k.a. Circuit, Munna's sidekick
- Sunil Dutt as Shri Hari Prasad Sharma, Munna's father
- Jimmy Sheirgill as Zaheer Ali Khan, a terminally ill patient and Munna's friend
- Gracy Singh as Dr. Suman Asthana (a.k.a. Chinki), Asthana's daughter and a faculty member of the medical institute
- Boman Irani as Dr. Jagdish Chandra "JC" Asthana, Suman's father and the medical institute dean
- Rohini Hattangadi as Parvati Sharma, Munna's mother
- Neha Dubey as Shalini, Suman's friend who pretends to be Chinki
- Kurush Deboo as Dr. Rustom Pavri, a faculty member of the medical institute
- Yatin Karyekar as Anand Banerjee, a brain-dead patient and Munna's friend (dubbed by Rajkumar Hirani)
- Nawazuddin Siddiqui as a pickpocket who tried to steal Hari's wallet at the railway station (uncredited)
- Rohitash Gaud as the coconut seller in the park
- Mumaith Khan as Nandini (a.k.a. Reena), the cabaret dancer in the song "Dekh Le" (cameo appearance)
- Priya Bapat as Meenal, first year medical student
- Pushkar Shrotri as a professor in the medical institute
- Vishal Thakkar as Karan, a suicidal patient
- Anuradha Chandan as Karan's mother
- Khurshed Lawyer as Nagrajan Swami, a first year medical student and Munna's roommate
- Bomi Dotiwala as Rustom's carrom-obsessed father
- Kenneth Desai as Ghanshyam Seth, a man who is kidnapped by Munna in the beginning of the film (uncredited)
- Vir Hirani as Short Circuit, Circuit's Son

== Production ==
=== Development ===
In an interview, Hirani discussed how the idea for the film emerged from his interaction with some friends who were medical students. Later, he also had the opportunity to interact with a lot of medical professionals when some members of his family became sick. These experiences gave birth to the idea for the film.

=== Casting ===
Hirani had initially conceptualised the film as a television series, and had approached R. Madhavan for the titular role. The actor turned down the role citing that he was busy with other commitments. Later, when Hirani decided to make the series into a feature film, he considered Anil Kapoor for the lead role during scripting stage. However, Shah Rukh Khan was later cast as Munna, but due to his spinal problems, Khan opted out of the film. Nonetheless, the end credits thanked Khan for his inputs into the script. Vivek Oberoi was also considered for the role, however he declined due to scheduling conflicts. Sanjay Dutt, who at the time was cast as Zaheer, was given the role of Munna, which ultimately helped change his controversial image at the time.

Hirani had narrated the script to Aishwarya Rai Bachchan, when Khan was part of the film, during the making of Devdas. Tabu and Rani Mukerji were also offered the role of Dr. Suman Asthana, the latter of whom declined due to scheduling conflicts, before Gracy Singh was cast.

The film marked the on-screen return of Sanjay's father Sunil Dutt after 10 years to play Munna's father. This marked the first only time in which Sunil and Sanjay appeared together, though they both starred in Reshma Aur Shera (1971), Rocky (1981), and Kshatriya (1993), they did not share any scenes together.

Boman Irani was cast as Dr. Jagdish Asthana, a role which was initially offered to Amrish Puri and Paresh Rawal.

Makarand Deshpande was the first choice for the role of Circuit, which eventually went to Arshad Warsi. The role proved to be a turning point for Warsi's career, who had several flops at the time.

=== Filming ===
The scenes of the Medical College were shot at the Agriculture College of Pune and Grant Medical College and Sir JJ Group of Hospitals in Mumbai.

Due to budget constraints, Hirani had to change the way certain scenes were filmed. The film ends with stills of Munna's wedding. Hirani was informed that setting up a wedding stage and making a wedding outfit for Gracy Singh would cost him several thousand rupees. Instead, Hirani arranged to have the stills on an actual wedding stage set up for a real wedding near the sets. The production crew reached an agreement with the wedding hall management and used their stage after a wedding had ended.

== Music ==
Munna Bhai M.B.B.S.

Soundtrack album by Anu Malik
- Released: 2003
- Recorded: 2003
- Genre: Soundtrack
- Length: 33:39
- Label: Universal
- Producer: Anu Malik

Anu Malik chronology
LOC: Kargil (2003)	Munna Bhai M.B.B.S. (2003)	Murder (2004)

The music of the film is composed by Anu Malik, with lyrics written by Abbas Tyrewala and Rahat Indori. Dutt's vocals were provided by Vinod Rathod.

According to the Indian trade website Box Office India, with around 1,000,000 units sold, this film's soundtrack album was the year's one of the highest-selling.

Track list
No.	Title	Lyrics	Singer(s)	Length
1.	"Chann Chann"	Rahat Indori	Vinod Rathod, Shreya Ghoshal	7:00
2.	"Dekh Le"	Rahat Indori	Sunidhi Chauhan, Anu Malik	3:24
3.	"M Bole To"	Rahat Indori	Sanjay Dutt, Vinod Rathod, Prachi, Priya Mayekar	8:20
4.	"Subha Ho Gayee Mamu"	Abbas Tyrewala	Shaan	4:01
5.	"Apun Jaise Tapori"	Abbas Tyrewala	Vinod Rathod, Sanjay Dutt, Arshad Warsi	5:32
6.	"Dekh Le (Remix by Jatin Sharma)"	Rahat Indori	Sunidhi Chauhan, Joi Barua	5:22
Total length:				33:39

== Accolades ==
Munna Bhai M.B.B.S. was the recipient of a number of awards. At the 50th Filmfare Awards, it received the Best Film (Critics), Best Screenplay, the Best Dialogue, and Best Comedian (for Warsi) in addition to four other nominations. It won a number of awards at the 2004 Zee Cine Awards including Best Debuting Director, Best Actor in a Comic Role (for Warsi), Best Cinematography, and Best Dialogue.

Other ceremonies include the 2004 National Film Awards where it won the National Film Award for Best Popular Film and the 2004 International Indian Film Academy Awards where it won the IIFA Best Comedian Award.

Date of ceremony	Awards	Category	Recipient(s) and nominee(s)	Result	Ref.
3 February 2005	51st National Film Awards	Best Popular Film Providing Wholesome Entertainment	Munna Bhai M.B.B.S.	Won	
20 February 2004	49th Filmfare Awards	Best Film (Critics)	Munna Bhai M.B.B.S.	Won	
20 February 2004	49th Filmfare Awards	Best Film	Munna Bhai M.B.B.S.	Nominated	
20 February 2004	49th Filmfare Awards	Best Screenplay	Vidhu Vinod Chopra, Rajkumar Hirani, Lajan Joseph	Won	
20 February 2004	49th Filmfare Awards	Best Director	Rajkumar Hirani	Nominated	
20 February 2004	49th Filmfare Awards	Best Comedian	Sanjay Dutt	Won	
20 February 2004	49th Filmfare Awards	Best Comedian	Boman Irani	Nominated	
20 February 2004	49th Filmfare Awards	Best Dialogues	Abbas Tyrewala	Won	
20 February 2004	49th Filmfare Awards	Best Supporting Actor	Arshad Warsi	Nominated	
22 May 2004	International Indian Film Academy Awards	Best Screenplay	Vidhu Vinod Chopra, Rajkumar Hirani, Lajan Joseph	Won	
22 May 2004	International Indian Film Academy Awards	Best Actor in a Comic Role	Boman Irani	Won	
22 May 2004	International Indian Film Academy Awards	Best Dialogues	Abbas Tyrewala	Won	
22 May 2004	International Indian Film Academy Awards	Best Film	Munna Bhai M.B.B.S.	Nominated	
22 May 2004	International Indian Film Academy Awards	Best Editing	Rajkumar Hirani	Won	
22 May 2004	International Indian Film Academy Awards	Best Director	Rajkumar Hirani	Nominated	
22 May 2004	International Indian Film Academy Awards	Best Story	Rajkumar Hirani	Nominated	
22 May 2004	International Indian Film Academy Awards	Best Actor	Sanjay Dutt	Nominated	
22 May 2004	International Indian Film Academy Awards	Best Supporting Actor	Arshad Warsi	Nominated	
22 May 2004	International Indian Film Academy Awards	Best Music Director	Anu Malik	Nominated	
22 May 2004	International Indian Film Academy Awards	Best Lyrics	Rahat Indori (for the song "Dekhle Aankhon Mein Aankhen Daal")	Nominated	
22 May 2004	International Indian Film Academy Awards	Best Female Playback Singer	Sunidhi Chauhan (for the song "Dekhle Aankhon Mein Aankhen Daal")	Nominated	
28 May 2004	Producers Guild Film Awards	Best Debut Director	Rajkumar Hirani	Won	
28 May 2004	Producers Guild Film Awards	Best Editing	Rajkumar Hirani	Won	
28 May 2004	Producers Guild Film Awards	Best Director	Rajkumar Hirani	Nominated	
28 May 2004	Producers Guild Film Awards	Best Film	Munna Bhai M.B.B.S.	Nominated	
28 May 2004	Producers Guild Film Awards	Best Actor	Sanjay Dutt	Nominated	
28 May 2004	Producers Guild Film Awards	Best Supporting Actor	Arshad Warsi	Nominated	
28 May 2004	Producers Guild Film Awards	Best Screenplay	Vidhu Vinod Chopra, Rajkumar Hirani, Lajan Joseph	Nominated	
28 May 2004	Producers Guild Film Awards	Best Cinematography	Binod Pradhan	Nominated	
26 February 2004	Zee Cine Awards	Best Actor in a Comic Role	Arshad Warsi	Won	
26 February 2004	Zee Cine Awards	Best Actor in a Comic Role	Boman Irani	Nominated	
26 February 2004	Zee Cine Awards	Best Debut Director	Rajkumar Hirani	Won	
26 February 2004	Zee Cine Awards	Best Cinematography	Binod Pradhan	Won	
26 February 2004	Zee Cine Awards	Best Film	Vidhu Vinod Chopra	Nominated	
2004	Bengal Film Journalists' Association Awards	Best Film (Hindi)	Vidhu Vinod Chopra	Won	
2004	Bengal Film Journalists' Association Awards	Best Actor (Hindi)	Sanjay Dutt	Won	
2004	Bengal Film Journalists' Association Awards	Best Supporting Actor (Hindi)	Arshad Warsi	Won	
2004	Bollywood Movie Awards	Best Director	Rajkumar Hirani	Won	
2004	Bollywood Movie Awards	Most Sensational Actor	Sanjay Dutt	Won	
2004	Bollywood Movie Awards	Best Supporting Actor	Arshad Warsi	Won	
21 December 2010	BIG Entertainment Awards	Best Film of the Decade	Munna Bhai M.B.B.S.	Nominated	

== Sequel ==
In February 2004, after the success of Munna Bhai M.B.B.S., Rajkumar Hirani decided to work on his next project. He, along with his co-writer Abhijat Joshi, started to write the script of their new film. They didn't want the script to include Munna Bhai, but after they wrote it, the script eventually turned out to be of Lage Raho Munna Bhai. Sanjay Dutt, Sunil Dutt, Arshad Warsi and Boman Irani were to reprise their roles but after the death of Sunil in May 2005, Hirani decided that the film will only have Sanjay & Warsi to reprise their characters from Munna Bhai M.B.B.S. and other actors like Boman Irani and Jimmy Shergill were cast in new roles. Lage Raho Munna Bhai was released on 1 September 2006 and turned out to be a huge success.

== Remakes ==
The film was remade in Telugu as Shankar Dada M.B.B.S. (2004), in Tamil as Vasool Raja M.B.B.S. (2004), in Kannada as Uppi Dada M.B.B.S. (2007) and in Sinhala as Dr. Nawariyan (2017).

== Accusations of plagiarism ==
The film has a similar premise to the 1998 American film Patch Adams, starring Robin Williams. Producer Vidhu Vinod Chopra denies there being a resemblance, and says that he had not watched the film before the release of Munna Bhai. Years later, accusations of plagiarism resurfaced on social media when some netizens highlighted scene-to-scene copies.
