= Gandhigiri =

Neologism in India

Gandhigiri is a neologism in India which is used to express the tenets of Gandhism (the ideas of Mahatma Gandhi, which include Satyagraha and Ahimsa) in contemporary terms. The term became popular due to its usage in the 2006 Hindi film, Lage Raho Munna Bhai.

== Usage ==
As a colloquial expression in various languages in India including Marathi, Hindi and Tamil, "Gandhigiri" refers to the practice of the ideals of Mahatma Gandhi. It is a colloquial form of Gandhism. Gandhism (or Gandhianism) is a term which attempts to summarize the philosophies of Mahatma Gandhi. Basic tenets of Gandhism include satya (truth) and Satyagraha: "Truth (satya) implies love, and firmness (agraha) engenders and therefore serves as a synonym for force...that is to say, the Force which is born of Truth and Love or non-violence." Gandhi further noted of the term, Satyagraha,

Its root meaning is holding on to truth, hence truth-force. I have also called it Love-force or Soul-force. In the application of Satyagraha I discovered in the earliest stages that pursuit of truth did not admit of violence being inflicted on one's opponent but that he must be weaned from error by patience and sympathy. For what appears to be truth to the one may appear to be error to the other. And patience means self-suffering. So the doctrine came to mean vindication of truth not by infliction of suffering on the opponent but on one's self."

In this context, "Gandhigiri" is sometimes juxtaposed to "Dadagiri" (bullying) (as it was in Lage Raho Munna Bhai, where Munna Bhai had to learn to give up "Dadagiri" in exchange for "Gandhigiri").

== Popularization of term ==
=== Overview ===
Lage Raho Munna Bhai is a 2006 Indian musical comedy directed by Rajkumar Hirani and produced by Vidhu Vinod Chopra. Sanjay Dutt stars in this film as Munna Bhai, a local don of Mumbai (Bombay), who begins to see the spirit of Mahatma Gandhi. Through his interactions with the image of Gandhi, Munna Bhai begins to practice what he calls Gandhigiri to help ordinary people solve their problems.

Some have argued that the thematic attention to Gandhi's theories in Lage Raho Munna Bhai has both revived an interest in Gandhism under the new term, Gandhigiri in India and has likewise "made Gandhi suddenly hip. Inspired by the hit movie, Indians are increasingly embracing his philosophy, staging nonviolent protests, starting Web sites, handing out roses to enemies and putting on peaked white caps from the Gandhi era." Indeed, according to reports, Gandhi is now a "new pop icon" in India and as Arunabha Ghosh notes, "Gandhi, the man, was once the message. In the India of the post-liberalisation brand, Gandhigiri is the message." Several websites and internet forums were created, encouraging people to return to the Gandhian philosophy.

Theories for this sudden revival vary. Some have suggested that this phenomenon could be attributed to the film simplifying Gandhi's "lofty ideals" and conveying them "in contemporary, colloquial language. Others, according to The Christian Science Monitor, have noted that the appeal of the film lies in the fact that "Gandhi gets his hands dirty. He appears as an apparition only visible to the wayward gangster, counselling him on how to help others deal with everyday problems." Whatever the reason, a 13 October 2006 article in The Boston Globe, suggests that the revival has had a positive impact in India and states, "What America needs is a film that encourages people to take up Gandhigiri, Kinggiri, or Kennedygiri. If it worked for Bollywood, it could work for Hollywood."

=== Gandhigiri-style protests ===
Gandhi leading Salt Satyagraha, a notable example of Satyagraha

Since the release of the film, there have been instances where peaceful protests were either dubbed "Gandhigiri" or the protesters have claimed that they have been inspired by the movie. In the United States during July 2007, piles of flowers were sent to the United States Citizenship and Immigration Services office by individuals who were legally in the U.S. but caught in a green card backlog. This was an act of Gandhigiri (or nonviolent protest) copied from Lage Raho Munna Bhai. There have been positive reactions to this event. The USCIS shipped the flowers to the Walter Reed Army Medical Center and Bethesda Naval hospitals. A 15 July 2007 editorial in The Baltimore Sun argued, "let's hope their protest gets results - because Americans are fortunate to have living among them people who are this ingenious, and this thoughtful of others, and this capable of channeling anger into beauty." On 17 July, the USCIS announced that "it will accept applications from foreign professionals seeking permanent residency through an expedited process, reversing its earlier decision." USCIS Director, Emilio T. Gonzalez noted of the Gandhigiri protest, "The public reaction to the July 2 announcement made it clear that the federal government's management of this process needs further review [...] I am committed to working with Congress and the State Department to implement a more efficient system in line with public expectations."

In India, farmers stage a protest with flowers in the Vidarbha region, and people who organized a protest in Lucknow claimed to have been inspired by Lage Raho Munna Bhai to use roses to convey their message. In Lucknow students claimed to have been inspired by Lage Raho Munna Bhai to do volunteer work, planting trees "to conserve nature which is bound to benefit public health." Mafia don Babloo Srivastava claimed to have been inspired by Lago Raho Munna Bhai to distribute roses as a "message of love and peace".

== See also ==
- Struggle session, in Mao Zedong's China
- Two Minutes Hate, from George Orwell's Nineteen Eighty-Four
