= Lage Raho Munna Bhai =

2006 Indian film by Rajkumar Hirani

- Theatrical release poster
- Directed by: Rajkumar Hirani
- Written by: Screenplay & Dialogues: Rajkumar Hirani; Abhijat Joshi; Screenplay Associate: Vidhu Vinod Chopra
- Story by: Rajkumar Hirani
- Produced by: Vidhu Vinod Chopra
- Starring: Sanjay Dutt; Arshad Warsi; Vidya Balan; Jimmy Sheirgill; Boman Irani; Dia Mirza; Dilip Prabhavalkar
- Cinematography: C. K. Muraleedharan
- Edited by: Rajkumar Hirani
- Music by: Songs: Shantanu Moitra; Background Score: Sanjay Wandrekar; Shantanu Moitra
- Production company: Vinod Chopra Films
- Distributed by: Eros International
- Release date: 1 September 2006
- Running time: 145 minutes
- Country: India
- Language: Hindi
- Budget: ₹19 crore
- Box office: est.₹126.2 crore

Lage Raho Munna Bhai (pronounced [ləˈɡeː rəˈɦoː mʊnːaːˈbʱaːi]; translation: Keep Going, Munna Bhai) is a 2006 Indian Hindi-language satirical comedy drama film written, edited and directed by Rajkumar Hirani, who also co-wrote the screenplay with Abhijat Joshi, and produced by Vidhu Vinod Chopra under the banner Vinod Chopra Films. A sequel to Munna Bhai M.B.B.S. (2003), the film is the second installment of the Munna Bhai series. Sanjay Dutt and Arshad Warsi reprised their roles as the titular Munna Bhai and Circuit, respectively. New additions to the cast include Vidya Balan, Dilip Prabhavalkar and Dia Mirza, while several actors from the original, notably Jimmy Sheirgill and Boman Irani, appear in new roles.

In this film, the eponymous lead character, a crime boss in Mumbai, begins to see visions of Mahatma Gandhi. Through his interactions with Gandhi, he begins to practice what he refers to as "Gandhigiri" (a neologism for "Gandhism") to help ordinary people solve their problems.

Released worldwide on 1 September 2006, the film received widespread critical acclaim for its direction, story, screenplay, dialogues, performances of the cast, and its social message and themes, and proved to be a major box office success, grossing over ₹1.270 billion (equivalent to ₹4.1 billion or US$51 million in 2023) worldwide and became the third highest-grossing film of the year. At the 54th National Film Awards, Lage Raho Munna Bhai won 4 awards, including Best Popular Film Providing Wholesome Entertainment and Best Supporting Actor (Dilip Prabhavalkar). At the 52nd Filmfare Awards, the film received 12 nominations, including Best Film, Best Director (Hirani) and Best Actor (Dutt), and won 4 awards, including Best Film (Critics) and Best Comedian (Warsi).

Lage Raho Munna Bhai also had a number of prominent screenings. It was the first Hindi film to be shown at the United Nations, and was screened at the Tous Les Cinema du Monde section of the 2007 Cannes Film Festival. The film popularized the term Gandhigiri. Vidhu Vinod Chopra submitted the film as an independent entry for the 2007 Academy Award for Best Foreign Film. It was later remade in Telugu by Prabhu Deva as Shankar Dada Zindabad (2007), with Prabhavalkar reprising his role as Gandhi.

== Plot ==
Murli Prasad Sharma, alias "Munna Bhai," is a charismatic Mumbai gangster who falls in love with Jahnvi, a popular morning radio jockey. To secure a live interview on her show for Gandhi Jayanti, his loyal lieutenant, Circuit, and their gang rig a history contest. During the broadcast, Munna poses as a professor of Gandhian studies, falsely claiming to practice Mahatma Gandhi's principles of truth and non-violent resistance (Satyagraha). Impressed, Jahnvi invites him to lecture at "Second Innings House," a communal residence for abandoned senior citizens managed by her grandfather.

To prepare, Munna spends five consecutive days researching in a historical library. Sleep deprivation and psychological strain trigger vivid hallucinations of Gandhi, who becomes his moral conscience. Unaware of the cause of these visions, Munna delivers a compelling lecture that wins over Jahnvi and the residents. Meanwhile, Lucky Singh, a superstitious real estate tycoon who hires Munna's gang for illegal land seizures, discovers Munna's feelings for Jahnvi. Lucky sponsors an all-expenses-paid trip to Goa for the residents, ostensibly as an act of charity. While Munna uses the opportunity to propose to Jahnvi, Lucky takes possession of Second Innings House and locks out its occupants.

Lucky wants the property to secure a lucrative marriage between his daughter, Simran, and Sunny, the son of corporate magnate K.K. Khurana. Guided by his astrologer, Batuk Maharaj, Khurana considers the property's location auspicious for the couple. To preserve the alliance, Lucky also bribes Batuk to falsify Simran's birth charts, concealing her status as a Manglik, supposedly destined to bring misfortune to her husband.

When corrupt officials and legal authorities refuse to help, Munna fights back by applying Gandhi's principles. Co-hosting a daily radio segment with Jahnvi, he helps ordinary citizens resolve their problems through creative forms of non-violent non-cooperation. He urges listeners to send thousands of flowers to Lucky's headquarters in a peaceful campaign intended to cure Lucky of his "disease of dishonesty." The campaign attracts widespread attention and damages Lucky's public reputation.

Guided by his visions of Gandhi, Munna writes Jahnvi a letter confessing his criminal past and academic deception. Heartbroken by his lies, she ends their relationship and quits the radio station. Lucky exploits the situation by staging a press conference at which Munna's psychiatrist confirms that he suffers from severe psychological delusions.

Convinced that his visions were merely symptoms of mental illness, Munna prepares to leave Mumbai with Circuit. However, he decides to make one final broadcast to reach Jahnvi, briefly holding the radio studio hostage. Meanwhile, on her wedding day, Simran discovers her father's deception concerning her birth charts and flees. She takes a taxi driven by Victor D'Souza, a man previously helped by Munna's radio show, who connects her to the live broadcast. Munna persuades Simran to return to the wedding pavilion and confront her family honestly.

When Khurana and Batuk attempt to cancel the wedding after learning the truth, Sunny defies his father's superstitions and chooses to marry Simran out of mutual respect. Munna and Circuit are arrested for disrupting the radio station, but their commitment to honesty inspires others to change. Recognizing his wrongdoing, Lucky bails Munna out and returns the deeds to Second Innings House.

Jahnvi reconciles with Munna, and the couple builds a successful broadcasting career promoting non-violent activism, popularly known as "Gandhigiri." In the aftermath, the senior residents legally adopt Circuit as their surrogate son, Victor achieves corporate independence, and Sunny and Simran move to Sydney. Khurana dismisses Batuk and renounces his reliance on numerology. In the final scene, Lucky studies Gandhian philosophy in the same library where Munna experienced his visions, and Gandhi begins appearing to him as well.

== Cast ==
- Sanjay Dutt as Murli Prasad Sharma (a.k.a. Munna Bhai)
- Arshad Warsi as Sarkeshwar (a.k.a. Circuit), Munna's sidekick
- Vidya Balan as Janhvi Sahni, Mumbai's radio jockey
- Jimmy Sheirgill as Victor D'Souza; Munna's friend
- Boman Irani as Lucky Singh
- Dilip Prabhavalkar as Mahatma Gandhi
- Dia Mirza as Simran Singh, Lucky's daughter
- Rita Joshi as Nurse
- Kulbhushan Kharbanda as Khurana, Simran's to-be father-in-law
- Parikshat Sahni as A. L. D'Souza, Victor's father
- Saurabh Shukla as Batuk Maharaj, Khurana's astrologer
- Supriya Shukla as Lucky's wife
- Achyut Potdar as Second Innings House resident
- Atmaram Bhende as Atmaram Desai, Second Innings House resident
- Arun Bali as Second Innings House resident
- Bomi Dotivala as Bomi Uncle, Second Innings House resident
- Abhishek Bachchan as Sunny Khurana, Khurana's son (cameo appearance)
- Rohitash Gaud as Cuckoo, Lucky Singh's assistant
- Ashwin Mushran as Hari Desai, Atmaram's son
- Uday Sabnis as G. S. Gaitonde, a municipality officer
- Hemu Adhikari as a Retired teacher
- Priya Bapat as Priya, the girl who contacts Munna on his radio show
- Ninad Kamat as Vishal Chawla, Janhvi's lawyer
- Kurush Deboo as Advocate Dhansukh Bhai Patel (cameo appearance)
- Atul Srivastava as Sunil Dubey, Munna's henchman
- Nagrajan Swami as Khurshed Lawyer

== Production ==
The Munna Bhai series began after Vidhu Vinod Chopra agreed to produce Rajkumar Hirani's 2003 film Munna Bhai M.B.B.S. when no one else would (Hirani had worked as an editor on Chopra's 2000 film Mission Kashmir). They also collaborated on the script. Munna Bhai M.B.B.S. was a runaway success that prompted the duo to contemplate a sequel. The sequel was initially known as Munna Bhai Meets Mahatma Gandhi and was later titled Munna Bhai: 2nd Innings before the title Lage Raho Munna Bhai was finalized.

In an interview, Hirani admitted that he felt the burden of expectation while writing the screenplay for Lage Raho Munna Bhai, as he had to create "something to match" the first film. Initially, there was some effort to incorporate scenes or characteristics of the first film into the sequel (such as the idiosyncratic laugh of Asthana, portrayed by Boman Irani in the first installment), but the risks of repetition were consciously averted.

One of Hirani's goals in making the film was to revive an interest in Mahatma Gandhi, a figure who he felt had been forgotten in contemporary India. To highlight this fact, Hirani recounted (during an interview) an incident with a chaiwala boy (who brings tea to the crew) during production:

The boy was curious, he was a big Munna Bhai fan and kept asking for the name of the film. The first working title was Munna Bhai Meets Mahatma Gandhi and Shantanu (Moitra, the music director) told him. So he said, 'Munna Bhai to theek hai, yeh Mahatma Gandhi Kaun hai?' ('Munna Bhai is fine, but who is this Mahatma Gandhi?') So this is the sad state of affairs today. I was shocked. And it's not just the chai-wallah. A few days ago on TV a lot of politicians were asked India-related questions on the news channels, and I can't believe a lot of them don't know 2 October is Gandhiji's birthday! Many didn't know his first name. They kept saying, 'what's in a name, we respect his ideals,' but come on! How can you not know his name?

The other screenwriter, Abhijat Joshi (who teaches in the department of English at Otterbein College in Westerville, Ohio), stated that he had been conducting extensive research on Gandhi, which inspired producer Chopra to involve Joshi in the creation of the second Munna Bhai screenplay.

While writing the screenplay, Hirani and Joshi stayed together for more than 4 months. They developed scenes by going out for a walk and discussing the scene. They would not return home until they had created a scene that would make them laugh, cry, or have some provocative thought. While there was a shortage of resources during the shooting of Munna Bhai M.B.B.S., the crew did not encounter a financial crisis during the filming of Lage Raho Munna Bhai, as the team managed to receive whatever was deemed necessary (including a Jimmy Jib, a specific kind of camera crane, just for a single crane shot). The film was shot on location in and around Mumbai, with Goa as a backdrop for the "Aane Char Aane" song.

Only 2 characters—those of Munna Bhai (portrayed by Sanjay Dutt) and Circuit (portrayed by Arshad Warsi)—were retained from Munna Bhai M.B.B.S. Several actors from Munna Bhai M.B.B.S., appeared in Lage Raho Munna Bhai as different characters. Vidya Balan was chosen to play the leading lady Jahnavi as her voice was thought to be appropriate for that of a radio jockey.

The actors used several techniques to develop their characters. Warsi encountered some initial problems reviving his character from the first film. Hirani recalled that on the first day of the shoot when Warsi said his first line, "he didn't sound like Circuit at all. He sounded like Arshad Warsi speaking with an accent." Warsi admitted that he had "forgotten" the character of Circuit and had to watch the DVD of Munna Bhai M.B.B.S. 3 times before being able to film the scene correctly. Dutt also confessed that he had to watch the first film 8 to 9 times to recapture the "persona" of Munna Bhai. In addition, Dutt stated in an interview that he did not read Gandhi's autobiography The Story of My Experiments with Truth as a preparation for Lage Raho Munna Bhai. Rather, he comments, his father, Sunil Dutt (who portrayed Munna Bhai's father in Munna Bhai M.B.B.S.) and his mother (the late actress Nargis) were his role models as they "were basically Gandhians. We were brought up with those values."

Dilip Prabhavalkar, who portrays Gandhi, read Gandhi's works "once again" to prepare for his role. Boman Irani prepared for the role of Lucky Singh by spending time with Sardarjis (male Sikhs) in auto spare parts shops to research his role. Vidya Balan met with a couple of radio jockeys and watched them at work.

== Themes and impact ==
=== Influences and allusions ===
Each film in the Munna Bhai series features Munna and Circuit in a story that is comprehensive unto itself and is not continued or referred to in another in the series. Director Hirani has compared this format to the films of Charlie Chaplin and Laurel and Hardy, as well as to the James Bond series. Others have also likened the series to the work of Laurel and Hardy. Some, however, have negated this comparison, stating that the series is more akin to the Road to... "buddy films" of Bob Hope and Bing Crosby. Hirani stated that his work was deeply inspired by the films of Hrishikesh Mukherjee.

=== Social influence ===
The interaction between the central characters of Mahatma Gandhi and Munna Bhai highlights concepts and ideas that draw upon the period of Colonial India and the Indian independence movement. Gandhi was a leader in this movement, challenging the British Empire's presence in India through the use of Satyagraha (non-violence). In the film, Jahnavi and Munna Bhai's non-violent protest against Lucky Singh serves as a metaphor for the Indian independence movement and the battle against the British Raj.

The thematic attention to Gandhi's theories in Lage Raho Munna Bhai revived an interest in Gandhism in India under the new term Gandhigiri and "made Gandhi suddenly hip" with Indians "staging non-violent protests, starting websites, handing out roses to enemies and putting on peaked white caps from the Gandhi era." Arunabha Ghosh, in December 2006, noted in The Economic and Political Weekly that, "Gandhi, the man, was once the message. In the India of the post-liberalization brand, Gandhigiri is the message." Amelia Gentleman of New York Times stated in September 2006 that:

"The real excitement was a Bollywood film [...] which [became] the unexpected box-office hit of the year [...] With its big Bollywood soundtrack and dance routines, the movie brings Gandhi firmly into the mainstream and theatres have been packed for the past 3 weeks."

The Congress Party recommended that all party members see the film. The Delhi authorities declared that tickets to the film would be sold tax free because of its assiduous promotion of Gandhian values.

Mark Sappenfield of The Christian Science Monitor argued in 2006 that the film was appealing because, "Gandhi gets his hands dirty. He appears as an apparition only visible to the wayward gangster, counselling him on how to help others deal with everyday problems." Swati Gauri Sharma suggested in The Boston Globe that what the United States "needs is a film that encourages people to take up Gandhigiri, Kinggiri, or Kennedygiri. If it worked for Bollywood, it could work for Hollywood."

=== Gandhigiri-style protests ===
Gandhi leading Salt Satyagraha, a notable example of satyagraha

After the release of the film, Gandhigiri-style protests began to take place in India. In 2006, farmers staged a protest with flowers in the Vidarbha region, and people who organised a protest in Lucknow claimed to have been inspired by Lage Raho Munna Bhai to use roses to convey their message. In Lucknow, students claimed to have been inspired by Lage Raho Munna Bhai to do volunteer work, planting trees "to conserve nature which is bound to benefit public health." Mafia don Babloo Srivastava claimed to have been inspired by Lage Raho Munna Bhai to distribute roses as a "message of love and peace". In 2008, Indian Greenpeace activists delivered thousands of roses to Ratan Tata, chairman of Tata Motors, to reconsider his plans of building a port at the nesting grounds of olive ridley sea turtles. The "Send Pramod Muthalik a Valentine's Day card" campaign in 2009 was inspired by the film.

In the United States during July 2007, Aman Kapoor, founder of the Immigration Voice forum, initiated a Gandhigiri protest inspired by Lage Raho Munna Bhai. Over a three-day period, hundreds of flower bouquets were sent to the United States Citizenship and Immigration Services (USCIS) office by Indians who were legally in the US but caught in a green card backlog. On 17 July, the USCIS reversed the decision that led to the protest.

=== Impact ===
Lage Raho Munna Bhai revived an interest in books about Gandhi. In particular, demand for Gandhi's autobiography My Experiments with Truth increased after the film debuted, including requests from prison inmates. In addition, due to its influence, the film was made tax-free in Mumbai.

== Soundtrack ==
Lage Raho Munna Bhai

Soundtrack album by Shantanu Moitra
- Released: 24 July 2006
- Recorded: 2005–2006
- Genre: Soundtrack
- Length: 32:28
- Label: T-Series
- Producer: Shantanu Moitra

Shantanu Moitra chronology
Yahaan (2005)	Lage Raho Munna Bhai (2006)	Khoya Khoya Chand (2007)

Professional ratings
Review scores
Source	Rating
Rediff	3/5 stars
Planet Bollywood	7/10 stars

The music of Lage Raho Munna Bhai was composed by Shantanu Moitra and the lyrics were written by Swanand Kirkire. Vocals for Dutt were supplied by Vinod Rathod and Sonu Nigam, and for Balan by Shreya Ghoshal.

Swanand Kirkire won the National Film Award for Best Lyrics in 2007 for the song "Bande Mein Tha Dum." According to the Indian trade website Box Office India, with around 1,000,000 units sold, this film's soundtrack album was the year's fourteenth highest-selling.

The song "Bande Mein Tha Dum... Vande Mataram" is structurally and musically inspired from the famous patriotic song "Aao Bachchon Tumhe Dikhaye" from the 1954 film Jagriti.

The melody of the track "Pal Pal.... Har Pal" was sampled from Cliff Richard and The Shadows song "Theme for a Dream"

The chorus in the song "Samjho Ho Hi Gaya" is copied from the song "Cast your fate to the wind" by Vince Guaraldi.

Track list
No.	Title	Singer(s)	Length
1.	"Lage Raho Munna Bhai"	Vinod Rathod	4:25
2.	"Samjho Ho Hi Gaya"	Sanjay Dutt, Arshad Warsi, Vinod Rathod	3:31
3.	"Aane Chaar Aane"	Karunya	4:30
4.	"Pal Pal... Har Pal"	Sonu Nigam, Shreya Ghoshal	4:32
5.	"Bande Mein Tha Dum... Vande Mataram"	Sonu Nigam, Shreya Ghoshal, Pranab Kumar Biswas	4:02
6.	"Bande Mein Tha Dum" (Instrumental)	Ashwin Shrinivasan	3:15
7.	"Aane Chaar Aane" (Remix)	Karunya	3:55
8.	"Lage Raho Munnabhai" (Remix)	Shaan	4:18
Total length:			32:28

== Release ==
=== Screenings ===
Screened on 10 November 2006 in the United Nations auditorium, Lage Raho Munna Bhai was the first Hindi film to be shown at the UN. The film was introduced by Shashi Tharoor, UN Under-Secretary General for Communications and Public Information. Taran Adarsh of Bollywood Hungama observed that, "there was a thunderous applause at the high points of the film, like the pensioner shedding his clothes. The applause at the end of the screening was unending. A vibrant Q&A session followed with director Rajkumar Hirani, writer Abhijat Joshi and actor Boman Irani, who flew to the U.S. for the screening." The Indo-Asian News Service (IANS) noted that, "an evening that had started with massive security arrangements in the sombre UN setting, concluded in a festive atmosphere in the lounge of the UN with diplomats from other tables joining in raising a toast for the film." The United Nations General Assembly announced on 15 June 2007 that 2 October, the day of Gandhi's birth (Gandhi Jayanti), was to be "the International Day of Non-Violence."

The Prime Minister of India, Manmohan Singh, was given a private screening of Lage Raho Munna Bhai. After viewing the film, he stated that it "captures Bapu's message about the power of truth and humanism." In a speech during his visit to South Africa, Singh said, "I was heartened to see recently that back home in India the most popular movie this festival season is a film about a young man's discovery of the universal and timeless relevance of the Mahatma's message." Singh announced the creation of a new Public Services Bill to combat corruption in a press release dated 17 November 2006, and cited Lage Raho Munna Bhai as one of its influences.

Lage Raho Munna Bhai was further screened at a global judiciary summit in Lucknow in December 2006. After viewing the film, Justice Kenneth Mithyane from South Africa commented, "The movie has re-enlivened the non-violence philosophy practiced by Mahatma Gandhi who continues to remain close to the hearts of the South Africans." Fatima Chouhan, a young member of the South African parliament, noted that, "Lage Raho Munna Bhai will be widely appreciated in South Africa. I'm carrying a couple of video discs for my family and friends."

It was part of the Tous Les Cinema du Monde section of the 2007 Cannes Film Festival. Lage Raho Munna Bhai was well received as the audience had lined "up in long queues to catch the film that had been strongly recommended in festival reviews [...] not one person who entered the screening left before the end of the 2-hours-30-minutes film." In addition, "the screening of the movie at the festival saw people sitting on the aisles as the theatre was completely packed [...] there was also a big group of French students that clapped till the credits were finished."

Several universities held screenings. It was shown on 27 October 2006 at the University of Southern California School of Cinematic Arts. The screening was followed by a question and answer session with Vidhu Vinod Chopra, Rajkumar Hirani, and Abhijat Joshi. Filmmaker Gurinder Chadha attended and spoke at the conclusion of the question-and-answer session. The film was screened at Old Dominion University on 20 March 2007 (as a part of Old Dominion University and City of Norfolk OnFilm Festival), the Massachusetts Institute of Technology Lecture Series Committee on 23 & 24 March 2007, and Harvard Law School on 3 April 2007 (as part of a series on nonviolence).

=== Home media and screenplay ===
The British DVD of Lage Raho Munna Bhai contains a bonus DVD which has a 98-minute 5-part documentary on the making of the film, interviews with members of the cast and crew, and information on the creation of the song and dance numbers. It also has a special feature called "Munna Meets Bapu".

Lage Raho Munna Bhai – The Original Screenplay was released in December 2009. Published by Om Books International in association with Vinod Chopra Films, it was launched at an event with the original cast and crew. The text includes an introductory note by Abhijat Joshi which details the drafting of the screenplay. It also includes a number of stills from the film as well as character profiles. The film is available on Netflix.

== Reception ==
=== Critical response ===
Lage Raho Munna Bhai received critical acclaim upon release. Subhash K. Jha said that "Munna and Circuit, arguably cinema's most adorable and roguish reformists since Laurel and Hardy go about the business of generating humour out of the pathos of the human condition. The sequences, all fiercely and famously path-breaking have us in splits [...] Watch the lovelorn Munna Bhai answer a Gandhian quiz on a phone-in radio quiz with the help of kidnapped professors' it's one of the most comically animated sequences seen in the movies of the new millennium." Taran Adarsh of Bollywood Hungama gave the film 4 out 5 stars, describing it as "a sparkling example of qualitative cinema" arguing that it "not only entertains, it also enlightens." Nikhat Kazmi of The Times of India observes that "Vidhu Vinod Chopra gives the great Indian family one more let's-go-goodwill-hunting entertainer, even as director Raju Hirani proves that sequels needn't have the been there-done that feel..." Rajeev Masand of CNN-IBN gave it 4 out of 5 stars and states: "Like those good old-fashioned Hrishikesh Mukherjee films, it also reinforces the importance of human goodness and basic niceties. Even if you might argue that some of Gandhi's principles seem outdated today, you cannot help but cheer for Munna and his gang as they achieve the impossible with love and kindness. And that is where this film transcends conventional boundaries. It entertains you, yes, but it also makes you yearn for a perfect world. Judge it by any yardstick that you may, Lage Raho Munna Bhai emerges a clear winner. Much of that credit must go to its actors who pull out all stops to make it an enjoyable ride." Poonam Joshi of the BBC gave 4 out of 5 stars stating that, "everything about this film works [...] It's rare to see a film that bounces between humour and sentiment so seamlessly. And it is rarer still to see characters become etched in the memory so enduringly that audiences become almost protective of them. It's testimony both to the quality of the writing and the performances, that Munna and Circuit have taken on a life of their own." Vinayak Chakravorty of The Hindustan Times gave 4 out of 5 stars stating that it "cleverly works its way around the obvious hurdle that almost all sequels face: The film recreates an original milieu without a hint of the déjà-vu downer. And that precisely ranks Lage Raho Munna Bhai as one of the best entertainers this year." He commended it for showing "the heights Hindi cinema can scale despite staying within its masala parameters. Lage raho, guys!" Phelim O'Neill of The Guardian gave the film 4 out of 5 stars noting that, "as western romantic comedies become more vapid and even stalkerish, this delivers a credible message of peace, while never forgetting to be magnificent entertainment." Shastri Ramachandaran of The Tribune wrote, "True, there have been memorable films on Mahatma Gandhi by distinguished directors, namely Richard Attenborough and Shyam Benegal;one offering a respectful cinematic acquaintance and the other being didactic but inspiring. For all their earnestness, neither film stirred the popular imagination like LRM has done now." Vaidyanathan from BBC declared that, "Lage Raho is not only as good as MBBS, but much better" calling it "a brilliant emotional roller coaster ride." Jeremy Page of The Times discussed its enormous popularity upon release and noted the "serious point [the film made] about the need for tolerance, restraint and self-sacrifice."

Other critics offered more negative reviews. Ajit Duara argues in The Hindu that "the accomplished cultural sophistication and political genius of Mohandas Karamchand Gandhi has to be dumbed down to the astoundingly moronic levels of Lage Raho Munna Bhai." Filmmaker Jahnu Barua was also critical, stating that "Gandhian philosophy is serious business and Lage Raho Munna Bhai is not the right way to show it." Jug Suraiya of The Times of India wrote that "thanks to Munna Bhai, at best what exists of Gandhism is Gandhigiri, a watered-down, Dale Carnegie's How to Win Friends and Influence People version of the original."

=== Other response ===
Filmmaker Kabir Khan cited Lage Raho Munna Bhai as a model film for him as it "had an issue, but it was never once in your face. Rajkumar Hirani kept it all so subtle and yet conveyed the message so well. It was as commercial as it gets and audiences too were thoroughly entertained. That's the way to make movies because it not just made all parties happy but also had a satisfied director at the end of it all."

According to Tushar Gandhi, Gandhi's great-grandson, it introduced the philosophies of Gandhi to a new generation, adding that "Bapu would've spoken the language of Gandhigiri if he were alive today. I really feel this film says something that needs to be told."

=== Box office ===
Lage Raho Munna Bhai was the fourth highest-grossing Bollywood film of 2006, earning ₹1,250 million (US$13 million) gross in India alone and was rated a "blockbuster". The film collected a further ₹498 million (US$5.2 million) during 2007 as the film enjoyed a tremendous golden jubilee run playing at a selected 210 cinemas until October of that year, being the only film to achieve this feat since Dilwale Dulhania Le Jayenge (1995). It was also financially successful overseas, earning ₹70 million (US$730,000) gross in the United Kingdom, ₹113 million (US$1.2 million) gross in North America, and ₹50 million (US$520,000) gross for the rest of the overseas proceeds, for a total of ₹223 million (US$2.3 million). Its total worldwide lifetime gross is ₹1.93 billion (US$20 million), the equivalent to just over US$40 million when adjusted for inflation 2016.

== Accolades ==
Lage Raho Munna Bhai is the recipient of 4 National Film Awards in addition to other awards. Some speculated that it would represent India as an entry for the 2007 Academy Award for Best Foreign Film. Although ultimately losing to Rang De Basanti as India's official submission, the producers submitted it as an independent entry. However, neither film received an Oscar nomination.

== Sequel ==
In a February 2026 interview with Variety India, director Rajkumar Hirani said that he is still working on scripts for sequels for both 3 Idiots and Lage Raho Munna Bhai.

== See also ==
- List of artistic depictions of Mahatma Gandhi
