= Derailed =

Derailed may refer to:

- Derailment, in which a rail vehicle leaves the tracks on which it is travelling

== Films ==
- The English language title for the 1942 Danish film Afsporet
- Derailed (2002 film), a 2002 action movie directed by and starring Jean-Claude Van Damme
- Derailed (2005 film), a 2005 thriller-drama film starring Clive Owen and Jennifer Aniston
- Derailed (2016 film), a 2016 action and crime movie starring Ma Dong-seok and Choi Min-ho

== Others ==
- Derailed (novel), a thriller by James Siegel
- "Derailed" (song), a song by German pop group No Angels
- "Derailed" (Ugly Betty), an episode of the TV series Ugly Betty
- "Derailed" (Chicago Med), an episode of the TV series Chicago Med
