= Derailed (novel) =

2003 book by James Siegel

- Author: James Siegel
- Language: English
- Genre: Fiction
- Publisher: Warner Books
- Publication date: 2003 (1st edition)
- Publication place: United States
- Media type: Print (hardback)
- Pages: 339 p. (hardback edition)
- ISBN: 0-446-53158-8 (hardback edition)
- OCLC: 50035118
- Dewey Decimal: 813/.6 21
- LC Class: PS3569.I3747 D47 2003

Derailed is a thriller novel written by James Siegel and published in February 2003. It tells the story of Charles Schine, a man who works in the advertising business, who suddenly finds himself having an affair, being blackmailed, and having the police investigate him for murder, all because he missed his usual commuter train one day.

== Adaptations ==
- A movie based on the novel was released on November 11, 2005, in the USA. The film starred Clive Owen and Jennifer Aniston, Melissa George, among others.
- The Tamil movie entitled Pachaikili Muthucharam, directed by Gautham Vasudev Menon and featuring Sarath Kumar, Jyothika, Andrea Jeremiah and Milind Soman, was based on "Derailed".
- The Train: Some Lines Should Never Be Crossed, a Bollywood movie starring Emran Hashmi, Geeta Basra and Sayali Bhagat, was also based on "Derailed". Both these movies were released in the same year, 2007.
- A Sinhala movie titled Dakina Dakina Mal starring Damitha Abeyrathne, Roshan Pilapitiya, Roger Seneviratne and Semini Iddamalgoda, was made with a very similar storyline.
- The Ghanaian movie 'Temptation" was also adapted from this novel.
