= Soundrya Production =

Indian film production company

- Industry: Entertainment
- Founded: 2011
- Founder: Vinod Bachchan
- Headquarters: Delhi, India
- Key people: Vinod Bachchan
- Products: Film production Film distribution
- Website: www.soundryaproduction.com

Soundrya Production is Production Company in India which is founded by Vinod Bachchan and the company has debut in 2011, movie Tanu Weds Manu.

== Film production ==
Year	Title	Director(s)	Genre	Starring	Notes
2011	Tanu Weds Manu	Aanand L. Rai	Romantic drama	R. Madhavan, Kangana Ranaut, Jimmy Sheirgill	
2013	Zilla Ghaziabad	Anand Kumar	Action	Arshad Warsi, Sanjay Dutt, Vivek Oberoi, Minisha Lamba, Paresh Rawal	
2017	Shaadi Mein Zaroor Aana	Ratna Sinha	Comedy	Rajkummar Rao, Kriti Kharbanda	
2020	Ginny Weds Sunny	Puneet Khanna	Comedy	Vikrant Massey, Yami Gautam	
2026	Ginny Wedss Sunny 2	Prasshant Jha	Romantic comedy	Avinash Tiwary, Medha Shankr	
