= MTHR Global =

Movement for HR professionals in India

More Than HR Global
- Formation: February 2002
- Type: Nonprofit organisation
- Location: Mumbai, India
- Region served: Worldwide
- Key people: Rajesh Gupta, Rajesh Kamath, Vipul Agarwal & Keyur Jani
- Website: www.mthrglobal.com

MTHR Global (More Than HR Global) is a not-for-profit organisation based in Mumbai.

== History ==
MTHR Global commenced as an online forum in Feb 2002.

== Academic collaboration ==
MTHR has tie ups with academia to create a platform for the students to hone their skills & stay updated about recent industry trends. Events like Panel Discussions, Technical Seminars & orientation from industry experts are organised in these institutes to facilitate student development.

Few of the several collaborations include

- Alkesh Dinesh Mody Institute
- N. L. Dalmia Institute of Management Studies and Research
- Vivekanand Education Society's Institute of Management Studies and Research

== Activities ==
To equip HR professionals with latest industry trends, MTHR Global in association with several corporations & institutions, organise workshops, seminars, panel discussions addressed by industry experts. Also there are Continuous Learning Programmes, Strategic HR course & mentor ship programmes & Behavioural Assessments for the members.
