= Vivekanand Education Society's College of Law =

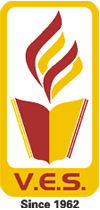
Vivekanand Education Society's College of Law

Vivekanand Education Society's College of Law is a law school located in Sindhi Society Locality, Chembur, Mumbai. The school provides LLB, Five Year BLS (Bachelor of Legal Sciences) LL.B as well as Certificate Courses in Human Rights, Intellectual Property Rights and Social Research Methodology programs.

Vivekanand Education Society's College of Law was established in 2009. The college is affiliated to Mumbai University and recognised by Bar Council of India. The College is a part of Vivekanand Education Society trust, which operates several educational institutions. The College operates from the campus of Vivekanand Education Society's College of Arts, Science and Commerce.

The College organises various events like Debates, Seminars, Advocacy Skills competition, Legal Counseling Camp and a National Moot Court Competition. The college also publishes an Annual Magazine ‘Vidhi Vivek’, which is a platform for the faculties and students to express themselves on various legal as well as socio-economic issues in the form of articles, poems, pictures, graphics etc.

The library occupies a place of pride in Vivekanand Education Society’s College of Law. The main goal of the library is to help in generation of knowledge through acquisition, organization and dissemination of legal information and value-added services.

== See also ==
- List of Vivekanand Education Society’s schools and colleges
