= The Train (2007 film) =

- Poster
- Directed by: Hasnain Hyderabadwala; Raksha Mistry
- Produced by: Narendra Bajaj; Shyam Bajaj
- Starring: Emraan Hashmi; Geeta Basra; Sayali Bhagat; Aditi Bhatia
- Cinematography: K. Rajkumar
- Edited by: Bunty Nagi
- Music by: Songs: Mithoon; Background Score: Sanjoy Chowdhury
- Production company: Siddhi Vinayak Creations
- Distributed by: Shree Ashtavinayak Cine Vision
- Release date: 8 June 2007
- Running time: 134 minutes
- Country: India
- Language: Hindi

The Train: Some Lines Should Never Be Crossed... or simply The Train is a 2007 Indian Hindi-language crime thriller film directed by Hasnain Hyderabadwala and Raksha Mistry. The film stars Emraan Hashmi, Geeta Basra, and debutant Sayali Bhagat in the lead roles. It and tells the story of a married couple caught up in a complex emotional tangle revolving around an extramarital affair. It is a remake of the 2005 American film Derailed, which is an adaptation of James Siegel's 2003 novel Derailed. It was a box office disappointment.

== Plot ==
Vishal Dixit, a middle-class man in Bangkok, struggles with his deteriorating marriage and his daughter Nikki's critical need for a kidney operation. His life takes a turn when he meets Richa Malhotra (posing as Roma Kapoor), a woman in a similar unhappy marriage. Their affair leads to them being blackmailed by Tony, a criminal who ultimately reveals himself as Richa's accomplice.

Vishal's attempts to pay off Tony drain his savings, including money meant for Nikki's surgery. When he learns Richa and Tony are con artists, he tracks them down, leading to a confrontation where both Richa and Tony are killed in a gunfight. Vishal retrieves his stolen money from the hotel safe and returns to his family. Nikki's surgery is successful, and he reconciles with his wife, Anjali, promising a fresh start.

== Cast ==
- Emraan Hashmi as Vishal Dixit
- Sayali Bhagat as Anjali Dixit, Vishal's wife
- Geeta Basra as Roma Ram Kapoor alias Richa Malhotra, Vishal and Tony's love interest
- Rajat Bedi as Asif Ahmed Khan
- Anant Mahadevan as Sudheer
- Aseem Merchant as Tony
- Rajesh Khattar as Roma's friend
- Aditi Bhatia as Nikita "Nikki" Dixit, Vishal's daughter
- Suresh Menon as Charlie

== Soundtrack ==
The Train: Some Lines Should Never Be Crossed...

Studio album by Mithoon
- Released: 2007
- Genre: Feature film soundtrack
- Length: 60:59
- Label: T-Series

The music of the film was composed by Mithoon with lyrics penned by Sayeed Quadri. The songs "Woh Ajnabee", "Beete Lamhe" and "Mausam" were chartbusters.

No.	Title	Singer(s)	Length
1.	"Beete Lamhein" (Picturised on Sayali Bhagat and Emraan Hashmi)	K.K., Kshitij Tarey	05:01
2.	"Beete Lamhein" (Lounge Mix)	K.K.	06:17
3.	"Mausam" (Picturised on Emraan Hashmi and Sayali Bhagat)	Mithoon	05:45
4.	"Mausam" (Club Mix)	Mithoon	05:18
5.	"Mausam" (Progressive Mix)	Mithoon	04:50
6.	"Teri Tamanna" (Picturised on Emraan Hashmi and Geeta Basra)	K.K., Zubeen Garg	06:22
7.	"Teri Tamanna" (Club Mix)	K.K., Zubeen Garg	06:47
8.	"Teri Tamanna" (Euro Mix)	K.K., Zubeen Garg	05:37
9.	"The Train – An Inspiration"	Shaan	05:19
10.	"Woh Ajnabee" (Picturised on Sayali Bhagat and Emraan Hashmi)	Mithoon, Shilpa Rao	05:07
11.	"Woh Ajnabee" (Club Mix)	Mithoon, Shilpa Rao	04:36

== Reception ==
Taran Adarsh from Bollywood Hungama gave the film a 3 out of 5 stars, calling it a novel experience for those who have not seen Derailed.
