= Andrea Jeremiah =

Indian singer and actress (born 1985)

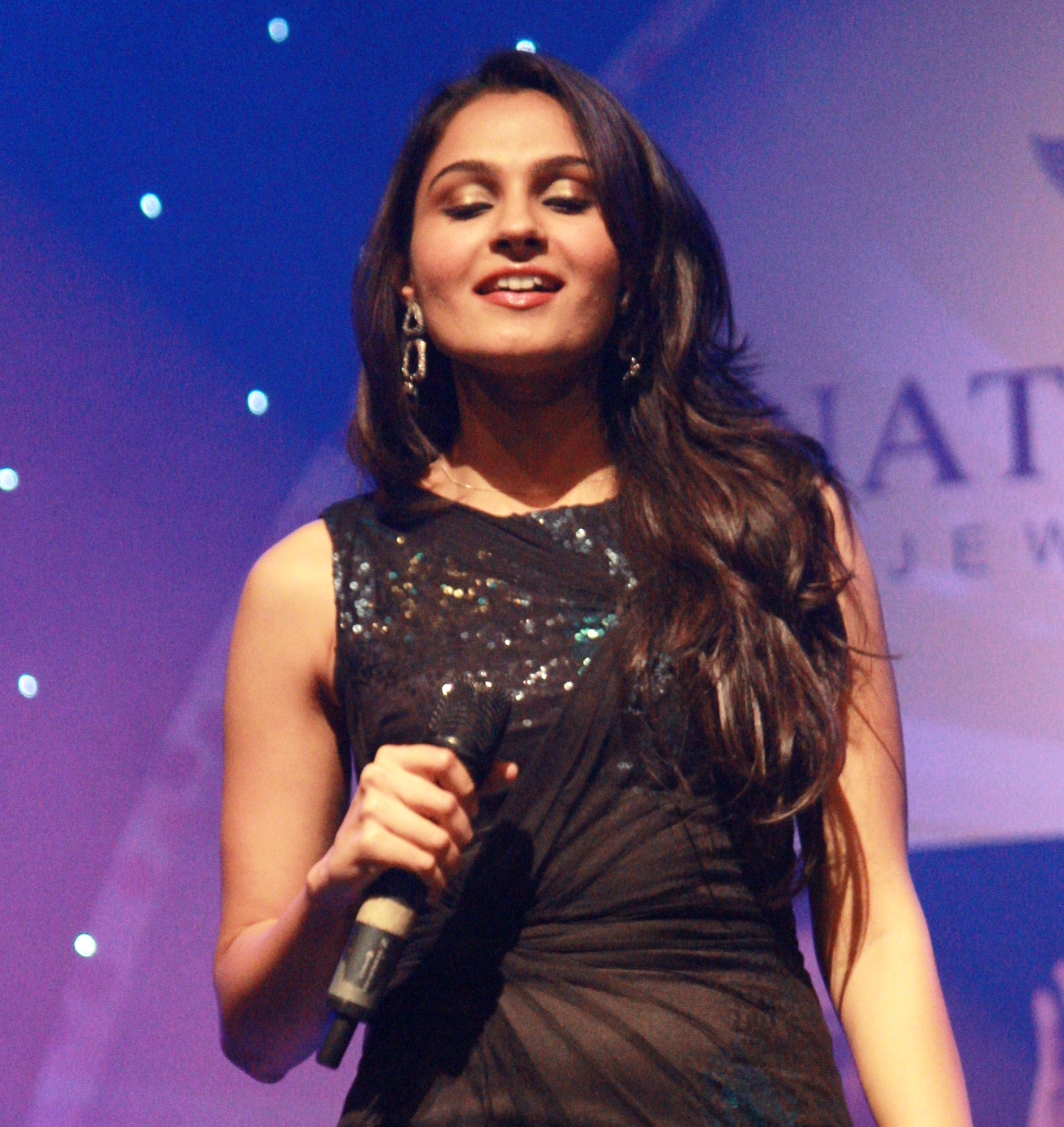
- Andrea in 2013
- Born: Andrea Maria Jeremiah; 21 December 1985 (age 40); Arakkonam, Ranipet district, Tamil Nadu, India
- Occupations: Actress, Singer, Film producer
- Years active: 2005–present

Andrea Maria Jeremiah (born 21 December 1985) is an Indian actress and singer who works predominantly in Tamil films. She was nominated at several awards including nominations for Filmfare Awards South.

Andrea made her playback singing debut with "Kannum Kannum Nokia" in the Tamil film Anniyan, with music composed by Harris Jayaraj. She made her acting debut in the Tamil film Pachaikili Muthucharam (2007). She has since appeared in several commercially successful films such as Annayum Rasoolum (2013), Vishwaroopam (2013), Tadakha (2013), Endrendrum Punnagai (2013), Aranmanai (2014), Loham (2015), Thoppil Jopaan (2016), Taramani (2017), Aval (2017), Vada Chennai (2018), Aranmanai 3 (2021) and Anel Meley Pani Thuli (2022).

== Early life and education ==
Andrea Jeremiah was born in an Anglo Indian family, in Arakkonam, Tamil Nadu. Her father is a lawyer at the Madras High Court. She has one younger sister and was raised near Chennai. She went to St. Joseph's Anglo-Indian Higher Secondary School, Perambur, Chennai, and graduated from Women's Christian College.

Andrea learned classical piano when she was eight. At age 10, she was a part of a Jackson Five-style troupe called Young Stars which formed the base of her early singing and music composing career. She was also a theatre artist in her college and appeared in several stage plays organised by The Madras Players and EVAM. She was the President of the Student Senate at Women's Christian College. She also organised a company, The Show Must Go On (TSMGO Productions), to promote live art and artistes. Andrea said that as a college student, she turned down every film offer she got as she had no intention of becoming a film actor.

== Career ==
=== Acting career ===
Andrea began her theatre career with Girish Karnad's Nagamandala. She acted in new leo coffee advertisement with actor Shiva in 2006. She also acted in a serial which relayed in Podhigai channel. She has performed all over India. After she rendered a song in Gautham Vasudev Menon's Vettaiyaadu Vilaiyaadu, he asked her to play as one of the lead female character in his next venture, Pachaikili Muthucharam. This film was a film adaptation of James Siegel's novel Derailed, with Andrea portraying Kalyani, a homemaker, whose husband engages in an affair and is blackmailed. Andrea was selected for the role after actresses Simran, Shobana and Tabu were approached.

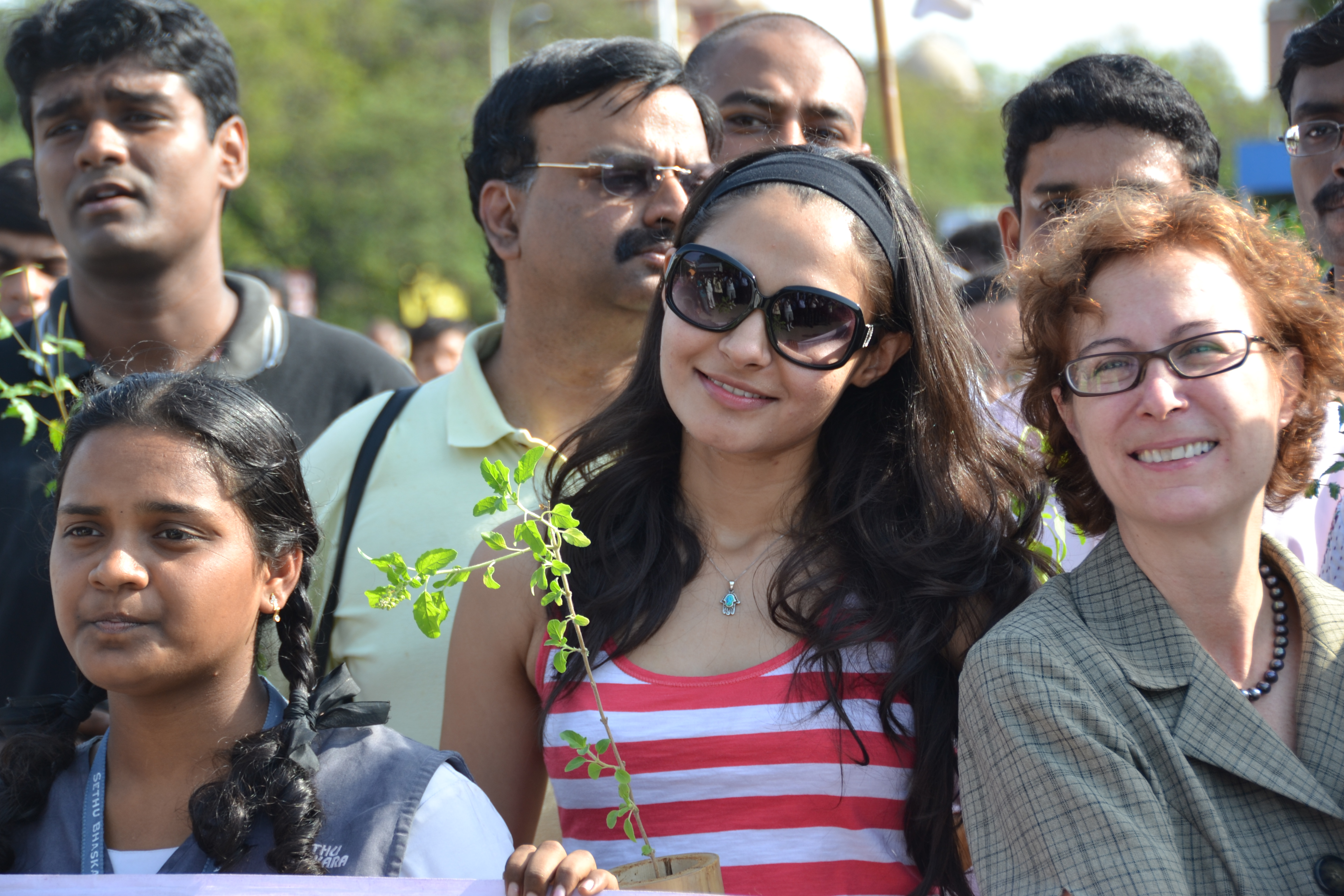
Jeremiah at US Consul General Jennifer McIntyre celebration of World Environment Day at Marina Beach on 5 June 2012.

She signed for Selvaraghavan's fantasy-adventure film Aayirathil Oruvan, which released in early 2010. In 2011, she agreed to play a minor supporting role in Venkat Prabhu's multi-starrer Mankatha, which was released in August 2011 and became one of the biggest commercial success.

In 2013, Andrea made her debut in Malayalam cinema with Rajeev Ravi's romance film Annayum Rasoolum, in which she played a Christian salesgirl opposite Fahadh Faasil. Anil R. Nair stated, "Andrea gels flawlessly to her mysterious character." The film was a commercial success and she termed it as the best film in her career.

In Puthiya Thiruppangal, she played a journalist. In Endrendrum Punnagai, she played a model and she also acted in the Malayalam film London Bridge. Her next film as female lead was the 2014 Aranmanai, directed by Sundar C. It was a box office success as well as a breakthrough film in her career. In 2015, Andrea was cast alongside Mohanlal in Loham, directed by Ranjith. This was her first film with Mohanlal and was a success at the box office.

In 2017, Andrea played a single mother in Ram's Taramani opposite Vasanth Ravi. Anupama Subramanian noted, "Andrea has given a performance to match the gravitas of her character. Taramani had plenty to offer and Andrea has not let the writers down. She simply excels." The film was a box office success and earned her acclaim. She played a role in Kamal Haasan's Vishwaroopam and reprised the role in its sequel, which released in 2018. She has signed a woman-centric thriller called Kaa – The Forest.

In 2021, her first release was Master. The film received mixed-to-positive and became successful at the box-office. Then she appeared as lead in Aranmanai 3, directed by Sundar C Though the film received mostly negative reviews, it became a commercial hit. Andrea Jeremiah plays a police officer and a princess in the thriller Maaligai. In 2022, the crime drama Anel Meley Pani Thuli is one of Andrea’s finest performances. In 2025, Mask is produced by Andrea Jeremiah who stars in the film along with Kavin.

=== Music career ===
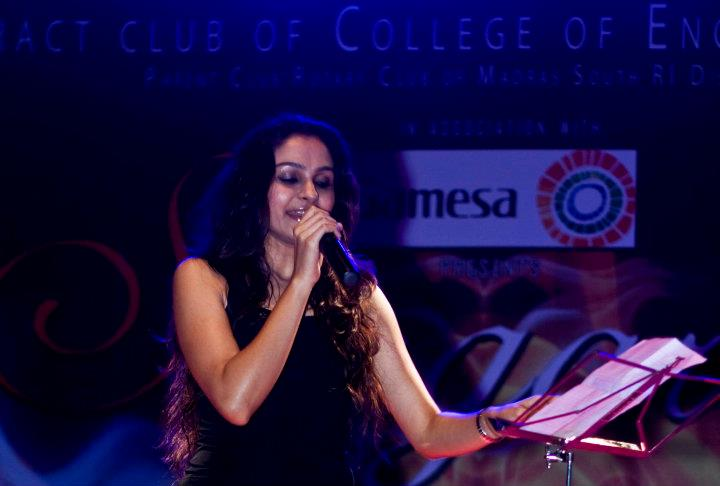
Andrea at a concert in 2011

Andrea has stated that her focus was always on music, that she chose to be a professional singer and that acting happened by chance. In 2005, she ventured into playback singing in feature films. She has sung several popular songs for composers Harris Jayaraj, Yuvan Shankar Raja, Anirudh Ravichander, Thaman, Devi Sri Prasad and G. V. Prakash Kumar and has also received nominations at Filmfare and Vijay Awards for a few of them. She considers the song "Maalai Neram" as the most challenging she has sung.

Apart from singing under other composers' direction, Andrea also produces her own music. She composed, wrote and sang a single, "Soul of Taramani", as a promo for her Tamil romantic-drama Taramani. She has composed several music themes, songs and albums.

== Media image ==
Andrea's character Althiya from Taramani, is considered among the most memorable female characters of Tamil cinema. In the Chennai Times Most Desirable Woman list, Andrea was placed 7th in 2017 and 16th in 2018, 25th in 2019, 27th in 2020.

== Filmography ==
Key
†	Denotes films that have not yet been released

=== Films ===
List of Andrea Jeremiah film credits
Year	Title	Role	Language	Notes	Ref.
2005	Kanda Naal Mudhal	Girl who Aravind bumps into in the final scene	Tamil	Uncredited	
2007	Pachaikili Muthucharam	Kalyani Venkatesh	Tamil	Lead Debut film	
2010	Aayirathil Oruvan	Lavanya Chandramouli	Tamil		
2011	Mankatha	Sabitha Prithviraj	Tamil		
2012	Oru Kal Oru Kannadi	Rajinimurugan's lover	Tamil	Guest appearance	
2012	Saguni	Andrea	Tamil	Guest appearance	
2013	Annayum Rasoolum	Anna	Malayalam		
2013	Vishwaroopam	Ashmita Subramaniam	Tamil	Bilingual film	
2013	Vishwaroop	Ashmita Subramaniam	Hindi	Bilingual film	
2013	Tadakha	Nandini	Telugu		
2013	Endrendrum Punnagai	Sonia	Tamil		
2014	Inga Enna Solluthu	Raghu's lover	Tamil	Guest appearance	
2014	London Bridge	Pavithra	Malayalam		
2014	Aranmanai	Madhavi	Tamil		
2014	Poojai	Special number	Tamil	Special appearance	
2015	Aambala	Vinay’s wife	Tamil	Guest appearance	
2015	Valiyavan	Subiksha	Tamil		
2015	Uttama Villain	Dr. Arpana	Tamil		
2015	Loham	Jayanthi	Malayalam		
2016	Idhu Namma Aalu	Priya	Tamil		
2016	Thoppil Joppan	Annie	Malayalam		
2017	Taramani	Althea Johnson	Tamil		
2017	Thupparivaalan	Pritha	Tamil		
2017	Aval	Lakshmi Krishnakanth	Tamil	Bilingual films	
2017	The House Next Door	Lakshmi Krishnakanth	Hindi	Bilingual films	
2018	Vishwaroopam II	Ashmita Subramaniam	Tamil	Bilingual films	
2018	Vishwaroop 2	Ashmita Subramaniam	Hindi	Bilingual films	
2018	Vada Chennai	Chandrakala (Chandra)	Tamil		
2020	Putham Pudhu Kaalai	Sadhana	Tamil	Anthology film; Segment: Reunion	
2021	Master	Vaanathi	Tamil		
2021	Aranmanai 3	Eeshwari "Raani"	Tamil		
2021	Maaligai	ACP Shanthi	Tamil	Only dubbed version released	
2022	Vattam	Parvathi	Tamil		
2022	Anel Meley Pani Thuli	Madhi	Tamil		
2024	Saindhav	Jasmine	Telugu		
2025	Mask	Bhumi / Varaprabhalakshi	Tamil	Also co-producer	
2026	Kaa – The Forest	Venba Subbaiah	Tamil		
2026	Leader	Inspector Indhra Sathyamoorthy	Tamil		
2026	Pisaasu II †	TBA	Tamil	Filming	
2026	No Entry †	TBA	Tamil	Filming	
2026	Manushi †	TBA	Tamil	Filming	

=== Television ===
Year	Title	Role	Language	Notes	Ref.
2013	Koffee With DD	Herself	Tamil	Episode 18	
2014	Bhima Music India	Judge	Malayalam		
2016	V Voice	Judge	Tamil		
2017	Super Singer	Judge	Tamil		
2018	Sun Naam Oruvar	Herself	Tamil	Episode 4	
2024	Super Singer 10	Herself	Tamil	Guest performer	

=== As dubbing artist ===
List of Andrea Jeremiah film credits as a dubbing artist
Year	Title	Actress	Notes	Ref.
2006	Vettaiyaadu Vilaiyaadu	Kamalinee Mukherjee	Also singer for song "Karka Karka"	
2010	Madrasapattinam	Amy Jackson		
2011	Aadukalam	Taapsee Pannu		
2012	Nanban	Ileana D'Cruz		
2015	Thanga Magan	Amy Jackson		
2019	Avengers: Endgame	Scarlett Johansson	Tamil version only	
2025	Vidaamuyarchi	Regina Cassandra		

== Discography ==
List of Andrea Jeremiah musical credits
Year	Song	Film	Language	Composer	Notes
2005	"Kannum Kannum Nokia"	Anniyan	Tamil	Harris Jayaraj	
2005	"Andarivaadu"	Andarivaadu	Telugu	Devi Sri Prasad	
2006	"Urugudhe"	Kalabha Kadhalan	Tamil	Niru	
2006	"We Have a Romeo"	Bommarillu	Telugu	Devi Sri Prasad	
2006	"Karka Karka"	Vettaiyaadu Vilaiyaadu	Tamil	Harris Jayaraj	
2006	"Zara"	Rakhi	Telugu	Devi Sri Prasad	
2006	"Gili"	Desamuduru	Telugu	Chakri	
2008	"Oh Baby Oh Baby"	Yaaradi Nee Mohini	Tamil	Yuvan Shankar Raja	
2008	"Nenu Nee Raja"	King	Telugu	Devi Sri Prasad	
2009	"Ammailu Abbailu"	Current	Telugu	Devi Sri Prasad	
2009	"Adadaa Vaa Asathalam"	Sarvam	Tamil	Yuvan Shankar Raja	
2010	"Maalai Neram"	Aayirathil Oruvan	Tamil	G. V. Prakash Kumar	
2010	"Um Mella Asanthan"	Aayirathil Oruvan	Tamil	G. V. Prakash Kumar	Nominated – Filmfare Award for Best Female Playback Singer – Tamil (with Aishwarya R. Dhanush)
2010	"Yeno Yeno"	Aadhavan	Tamil	Harris Jayaraj	
2010	"Theeradha Vilaiyattu Pillai"	Theeradha Vilaiyattu Pillai	Tamil	Yuvan Shankar Raja	
2010	"Idhu Varai"	Goa	Tamil	Yuvan Shankar Raja	Won – Music Award for Popular Duet of the Year (with Ajeesh) Nominated – Vijay Award for Best Female Playback Singer Nominated – Vijay Music Award for Popular Female Singer of the Year
2010	"Kanasinolage"	Ullasa Utsaha	Kannada	G. V. Prakash Kumar	
2010	"Pookal Pookkum"	Madrasapattinam	Tamil	G. V. Prakash Kumar	
2010	"Thediyae Thediyae"	Va	Tamil	G. V. Prakash Kumar	
2010	"Who's The Hero?"	Manmadan Ambu	Tamil	Devi Sri Prasad	
2010	"Naa Pere Malleswari"	Sye Aata	Telugu	Devi Sri Prasad	
2011	"Enakkaaga Unakkaaga"	Kadhal 2 Kalyanam	Tamil	Yuvan Shankar Raja	
2011	"No Money No Honey"	Vaanam	Tamil	Yuvan Shankar Raja	
2011	"Diwali Deepaanni"	Dhada	Telugu	Devi Sri Prasad	
2011	"Kadhalikka"	Vedi	Tamil	Vijay Antony	
2011	"Oru Murai"	Muppozhudhum Un Karpanaigal	Tamil	G. V. Prakash Kumar	
2012	"Yelelo"	Marina	Tamil	Girish	
2012	"Chill Out"	Endukante... Premanta!	Telugu	G. V. Prakash Kumar	
2012	"Madurai Ponnu"	Billa II	Tamil	Yuvan Shankar Raja	
2012	"O Crazy Minnal"	Naduvula Konjam Pakkatha Kaanom	Tamil	S Ved Shanker	
2012	"Google Google"	Thuppakki	Tamil	Harris Jayaraj	Nominated – Filmfare Award for Best Female Playback Singer – Tamil; Nominated – Edison Award for Best Female Playback Singer
2012	"Jikkimukki"	Maranthen Mannithen	Tamil	Ilaiyaraaja	
2012	"Poda Podi"	Poda Podi	Tamil	Dharan Kumar	
2012	"Google"	Rebel	Telugu	Raghava Lawrence	
2013	"Kando Kando"	Annayum Rasoolum	Malayalam	K	
2013	"Laila Laila"	Settai	Tamil	S. Thaman	
2013	"Nakula"	Vallinam	Tamil	S. Thaman	
2013	"Mama Douser"	Soodhu Kavvum	Tamil	Santhosh Narayanan	
2013	"Podhum Podhum"	Virattu	Tamil	Dharan Kumar	
2013	"Mouname Mouname"	Virattu	Tamil	Dharan Kumar	
2013	"Mazhaye Mazhaye"	Iruvar Ullam	Tamil	Vijay Antony	
2013	"Oye Oye"	Yevadu	Telugu	Devi Sri Prasad	
2013	"Engadi Porantha"	Vanakkam Chennai	Tamil	Anirudh Ravichander	
2013	"Festival Anthem"	11th Chennai International Film Festival	Tamil	Prakash Nikki	
2014	"Neeyum Dhinamum"	Thegidi	Tamil	Nivas K. Prasanna	
2014	"Vaanavil"	Vennira Iravuggal	Tamil	Lawrence Soosai	
2014	"Vaada Vaada Nanba"	Bramman	Tamil	Devi Sri Prasad	
2014	"Udal Vaangalaiyo"	Tenaliraman	Tamil	D. Imman	
2014	"Saga Saga"	Damaal Dumeel	Tamil	S. Thaman	
2014	"Low Aana Life"	Vadacurry	Tamil	Vivek-Mervin	
2014	"Ek Do Theen"	Anjaan	Tamil	Yuvan Shankar Raja	
2014	"Po Mone Dinesha"	Peruchazhi	Malayalam	Arrora	
2015	"Nee Sunno New Moono"	Nannbenda	Tamil	Harris Jayaraj	
2015	"Casanova"	Jil Jung Juk	Tamil	Vishal Chandrasekher	
2017	"Yaarada"	Aval	Tamil	Girishh	
2017	"Oru Koappai"	Taramani	Tamil	Yuvan Shankar Raja	
2018	"Ide Kalala Vunnadhe"	Bharat Ane Nenu	Telugu	Devi Sri Prasad	
2018	"Saadhi Madam"	Vishwaroopam 2	Tamil	Ghibran	
2018	"Jaathi Madhamula"	Vishwaroopam 2	Telugu	Ghibran	Dubbed version
2018	"Ishq Kiya Toh"	Vishwaroop 2	Hindi	Ghibran	
2018	"Mayakkuraane"	Annanukku Jai	Tamil	Arrol Corelli	
2018	"Dhaadikkaaraa"	Sketch	Tamil	S. Thaman	
2019	"Sorgaththa"	Thiruttu Kalyanam	Tamil	Vaidhy	
2019	"Tuckulingu"	KD	Tamil	Karthikeya Murthy	
2020	"Lovvu Lovvu'	Anbulla Ghilli	Tamil	Arrol Corelli	
2020	"Arivum Anbum"	Arivum Anbum	Tamil	Ghibran	
2020	"Ehunthu Va"	Independent Release	Tamil		Collaboration with Dinesh Kanagaratnam
2021	"Oo Solriya Oo Oo Solriya"	Pushpa: The Rise	Tamil	Devi Sri Prasad	Won – Behindwoods Golden Medals for Best Playback Singer Female
2021	"Mannennum Maaya Thee"	Boomika	Tamil	Prithvi Chandrasekhar	
2022	"Aatam"	Sila Nerangalil Sila Manidhargal	Tamil	Radhan	
2022	"Duvaa Duvaa"	Suzhal – The Vortex	Tamil	Sam C. S.	Web series
2022	"Jillu Jakkamma"	Vallan	Tamil	Santhosh Dhayanidhi	
2022	"A Track"	Biishman	Tamil	Rubesh Radhakrishnan	
2023	"Nillamaley"	Thuritham	Tamil	Isai Amuthan Athmasanthi	
2023	"Indha Kadhalil"	Bommai	Tamil	Yuvan Shankar Raja	
2023	"Rainbow Thiralil"	Takkar	Tamil	Nivas K. Prasanna	
2023	"Farhana"	Farhana	Tamil	Justin Prabhakaran	
2023	"Swetcha Ledu"	Month of Madhu	Telugu	Achu Rajamani	
2024	"Police Kaarana Kattikitta"	Jolly O Gymkhana	Tamil	Ashwin Vinayagamoorthy	
2025	”Idhudhan Engal Ulagam”	Mask	Tamil	G. V. Prakash Kumar	

== Awards and nominations ==
List of Andrea Jeremiah's awards and nominations
Year	Award	Category	Film	Result	Ref.
2008	Vijay Awards	Best Debut Actress	Pachaikili Muthucharam	Nominated	
2011	Filmfare Awards South	Best Supporting Actress – Tamil	Aayirathil Oruvan	Nominated	
2011	Filmfare Awards South	Best Female Playback Singer – Tamil (for "Un Mella Asanthan")	Aayirathil Oruvan	Nominated	
2013	South Indian International Movie Awards	Best Female Debut – Malayalam	Annayum Rasoolum	Nominated	
2013	South Indian International Movie Awards	Best Supporting Actress – Telugu	Tadakha	Nominated	
2013	Filmfare Awards South	Best Female Playback Singer -Tamil (for "Google Google")	Thuppakki	Nominated	
2013	Vijay Awards	Best Supporting Actress	Vishwaroopam	Nominated	
2018	Filmfare Awards South	Best Actress – Tamil	Taramani	Nominated	
2018	South Indian International Movie Awards	Best Actress – Tamil	Taramani	Nominated	
2019	South Indian International Movie Awards	Best Supporting Actress– Tamil	Vada Chennai	Nominated	

== See also ==
- List of Indian actresses
- List of Indian playback singers
