= Satish Modh =

Indian writer

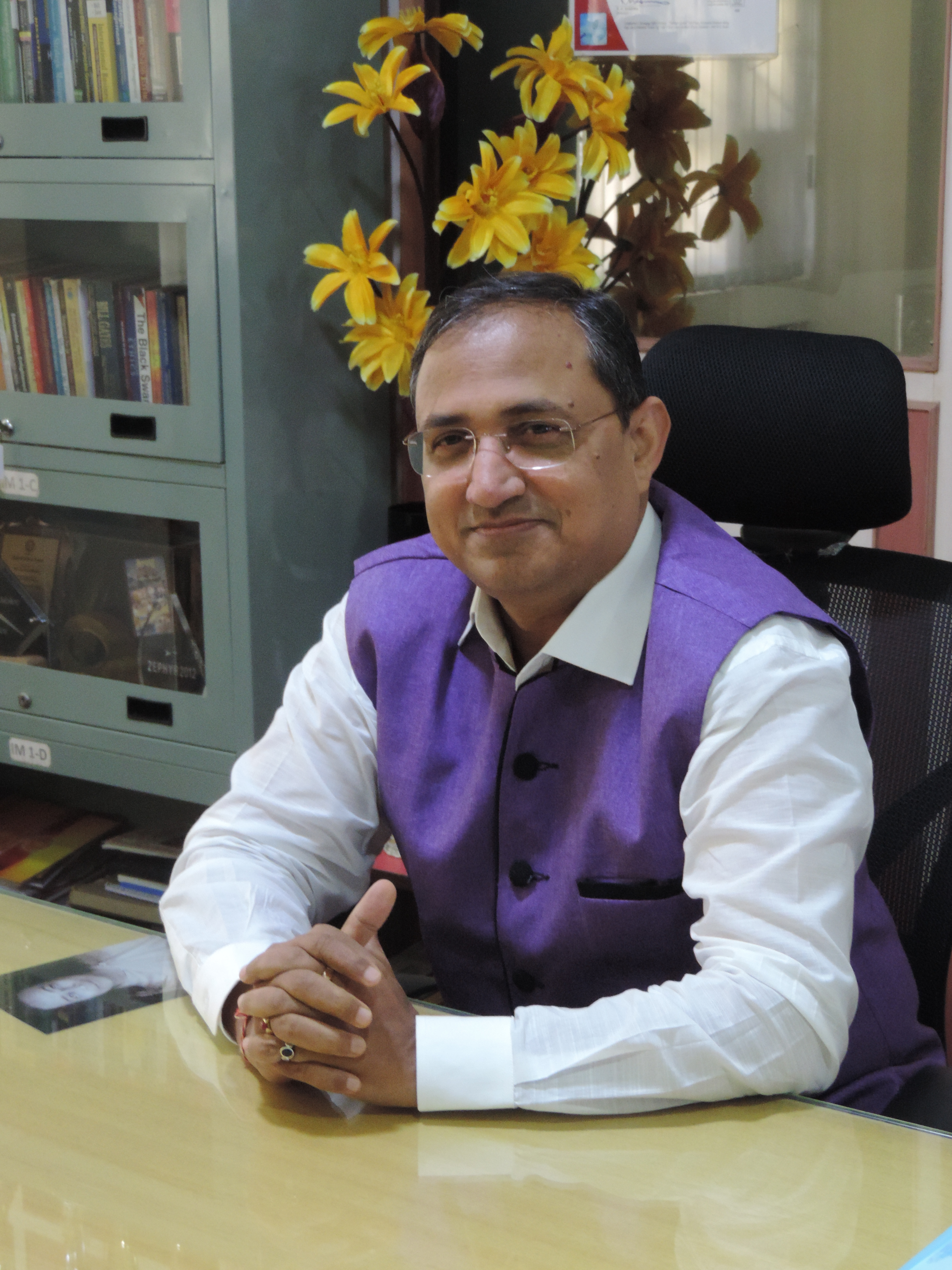
Satish Modh is Vice Chancellor at VIT Bhopal University

Satish Modh is Vice Chancellor at VIT Bhopal University. Previously he has held many leadership positions including at Somaiya Vidyavihar University, Mumbai (Pro Vice Chancellor), VESIM (Director and Professor), NMIMS University (Professor and Associate Dean), The Aeronautical Society of India, Mumbai Branch (Hon Secretary and Chairman), Air India (Dy General Manager and member of Business Transformation group) and Air India Aircraft Engineers Association (General Secretary).Satish Modh has authored several pioneering books on strategic management, leadership, ethics, disaster management and conflict resolution. He has been considered by several leading newspapers to provide expert opinion on contemporary affairs related to economy, business, higher education etc. His latest book Discover the Arjuna in You published by Jaico Publishing House was well received among management students & stalwarts.

== Early life and career ==
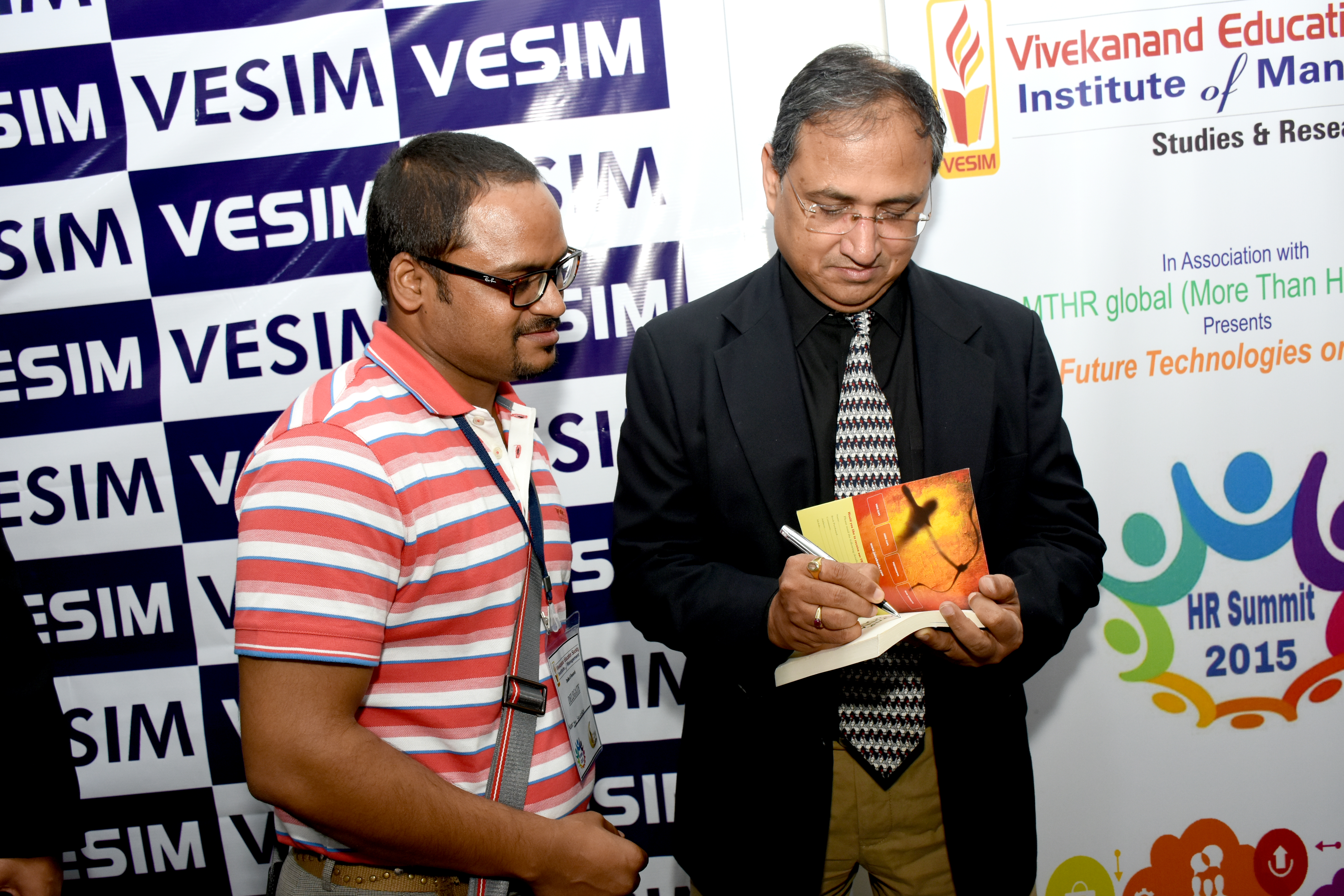
Book signing by Modh at MTHR Global Summit 2015

Satish Modh is Vice Chancellor at VIT Bhopal University, India. Earlier he was Pro Vice Chancellor at Somaiya Vidyavihar University Mumbai, Director, (VESIM) Vivekanand Education Society's Institute of Management Studies and Research , Mumbai. He completed his doctoral research from University of Mumbai in Business Strategy at Jamnalal Bajaj Institute of Management Studies, Mumbai. He has graduated from Maulana Azad National Institute of Technology, Bhopal in Electronics Engineering and later completed his Master of Engineering in applied electronics from Devi Ahilya Vishwavidyalaya, Indore with a gold medal, MFM form Jamnalal Bajaj Institute of Management Studies and LLB from University of Mumbai. He is one of the founder directors of World Hindu Economic Forum and he is also the founder and past president of Center for International Studies, Mumbai.

He started his career with the Ministry of Information and Broadcasting, Govt of India, but quickly left to join Air India as Aircraft Maintenance Engineer. He was a member of the team to design, develop and conduct an organization wide culture change program to cover most of the employees of Air India. He was also a member of 'Business Transformation Group' to prepare the turnaround strategy for Air India. He was elected as General Secretary of the Aircraft Maintenance Engineers Association, Hon. Secretary and Chairman of the Aeronautical Society of India, Mumbai Branch.

In 2011, he joined as Professor and Associate Dean, NMIMS University, Mumbai. He was a member of the Academic Council and other statutory bodies at NMIMS. In 2014 he joined as Professor and Director at VESIM, affiliated to the University of Mumbai. Under his leadership the institute received accreditation for NBA and NAAC and is ranked amongst top 100 business schools by NIRF since last 5 years. He is an NBA expert and is involved in awarding NBA accreditation.

In 2001, Professor Modh visited Gujarat after the earthquake. This created an interest in the field of disaster management and went on to publish various books namely ‘A Citizen’s Guide to Disaster Management’, ‘Introduction to Disaster Management’, ‘Managing Natural Disasters’ and 'Managing Technological and Environmental Disasters'. He has done research on Indian value system and has written a book ‘Ethical Management’. He is also the author of a popular book ‘Discover the Arjuna in You’.

Prof Modh has developed a personality test based on the Guna concept of the Gita. The test is also used for career guidance and leadership styles based on Triguna. He was invited to speak on these subjects and conduct personality tests at various universities in the USA including University of Southern California, University of North Carolina, San Diego State University, University of Central Florida, Athens State University, University of Washington (Seattle Campus), UT Dallas, UT Austin, Ohio State University, Michigan State University and several others.

Prof Modh was given 'Outstanding Reviewer Award' at Academy of Management Conference, Boston 2019 (MSR Interest Group).

== Books ==
- 2025: "RSS: The Bhagvad Gita in Action", Suruchi Prakashan.
- 2025: "Modi: The Master Problem Solver", Readomania.
- 2025: "The Bhagavad Gita in Simple English", Notion Press Media Pvt Ltd.
- 2025: "Arjuna's 15 Questions: Life Lessons from the Gita", Jaico Publishing House.
- 2019: "Managing Technological and Environmental Disasters" Himalaya Publishing Mumbai.
- 2019: "Building a Model of Change: Achieving Sustainability Through Social Entrepreneurship" Standard Publishers India.
- 2017: "Creative Entrepreneurship: A Sustainable approach for economic growth". Co-author: Nisha Pandey. Published by New Academic Publishers, New Delhi
- 2015: "Discover the Arjuna in You: An 18 Step Guide for Self-Awareness". Published by Jaico Publishing House, Mumbai.2014: Ethical Management: Text and Cases in Business Ethics and Corporate Governance – Second Edition, Trinity Press, New Delhi
- 2010: Managing Natural Disasters, published by Macmillan Publishers India, New Delhi.
- 2009: Introduction to Disaster Management, Published by Macmillan Publishers India, New Delhi.
- 2006: Citizen’s Guide to Disaster Management: How to save your own life and help others, Published by Macmillan Publishers India, New Delhi.
- 2005: Ethical Management: Text and Cases in Business Ethics and Corporate Governance, Published by Macmillan Publishers India, New Delhi.
- 2004: Aapda Prabandhan (Disaster Management in Hindi), Vishwa Samvad Kendra, Mumbai
- 2003: Sanskriti Sangam (Confluence of Cultures) Volume I and II, A Compilation of 99 articles on Ancient Traditions and Cultures of the World, Editor Satish Modh and Others, Published by ICCS, USA.
- 2002: A Citizen’s Guide to Disaster Preparedness and Emergency Care, Published by Bharat Vikas Parishad, Mumbai.
- 2000: Vishwa Mangal Hetawe – For the Welfare of the World, Editors Satish Modh and others, Published by Centre for International Studies, Mumbai.1999: The Care Revolution: A New Agenda for Resurgent India, CTI Publications, Mumbai.

== Chapters in books ==
- 2023: Narendra Modi: A case study of servant leadership, In: Dhiman, S.K., Roberts, G.E. (eds) The Palgrave Handbook of Servant Leadership. Palgrave Macmillan, Cham. https://doi.org/10.1007/978-3-030-69802-7_15-1
- 2022: Triguna Principles of the Gita and the Art of Servant Leadership. In: Dhiman, S., Roberts, G.E. (eds) The Palgrave Handbook of Servant Leadership. Palgrave Macmillan, Cham. https://doi.org/10.1007/978-3-030-69802-7_14-1
- 2022: Self-Transformation as a Prelude to Transform Organizations Based on the Ancient Traditions. In: Dhiman, S. (eds) New Horizons in Workplace Well-Being. Palgrave Macmillan, Cham. https://doi.org/10.1007/978-3-031-17241-0_2
- 2020: Enhancing Workplace Well-Being Through Understanding the Three Personality Types: Sattva, Rajas, and Tamas According to Samkhya. In: Dhiman, S. (eds) The Palgrave Handbook of Workplace Well-Being. Palgrave Macmillan, Cham. https://doi.org/10.1007/978-3-030-02470-3_22-1
- 2013. "The cosmic play of Triguna Energy: Philosophy and practice of conflict resolution from Bhagavad Gita" in Yashavant Pathak (Ed.) Eastern & Indigenous Perspectives on Conflict Resolution published by ICCS, USA: CreateSpace. ISBN 978-1491088135
- 2012: Innovative practices in the integration of human resources after merger: the case of Air India, in Bhatanagar J., et al. (Eds.) ‘Innovations in People Management: Cases in Organizational Behaviour, HR, and Communication’, Macmillan Publishers India.
- 2000: Learning Management from Ram-Katha, Article Published in the Souvenir of Vidyanidhi Education Complex in the honour of Sadhwi (Saint) Prema Pandurang in Mumbai
- 2000: Not Clash but Harmony of Cultures, in "Vishwa Mangal Hetawe – For the Welfare of the World", Pages 197–200; Eds. Satish Modh et al., Published by Centre for International Studies, Mumbai

== Awards ==
- 2019: 'Outstanding Reviewer Award' at Academy of Management Conference, Boston (MSR Interest Group).
- 2014 Devang Mehta Award for "Outstanding Contribution to Education" at Taj Lands' End Hotel, Mumbai
- Special award and commendation given by Air India in 1997 for conducting the corporate training program on customer service and change management "Together Towards Tomorrow".
- Satish Modh has been awarded as 'Most Influential Directors of India (Education)' by World Education Congress & Global Awards 2016.
