= List of Vivekanand Education Society's schools and colleges =

The Vivekanand Education Society (VES) is a Mumbai-based non-profit educational society founded in 1962 that operates 26 educational institutions (tertiary and secondary) located in the area surrounding Chembur, a suburb situated in central Mumbai, India.

The programs at its colleges are accredited by the All India Council for Technical Education, Bar Council of India, Maharashtra State Board of Technical Education, University of Mumbai and National Board of Accreditation.

== List of Vivekanand Education Society’s schools and colleges ==
=== Tertiary ===
- Vivekanand Education Society's Institute of Technology
- Vivekanand Education Society's Institute of Management Studies and Research
- Vivekanand Education Society's Polytechnic College
- Vivekanand Education Society's College of Law
- Vivekanand Education Society's College of Pharmacy
- Vivekanand Education Society's College of Architecture
- Vivekanand Education Society's College of Arts, Science & Commerce (Autonomous)
- Vivekanand Education Society's Business School
- Vivekanand Education Society's Tulsi Technical Institute

=== Secondary ===
- Swami Vivekanand High School
- Vivekanand English High School
- Swami Vivekanand Vidyalaya & Kanistha Mahavidyalaya
- Swami Vivekanand Junior College
