= Rohit Chaudhary =

Indian film and Television actor

- Born: Etawah, India
- Education: National School Of Drama
- Occupation: Film actor
- Years active: 2003-present

Rohit Chaudhary is an Indian actor. He is best known for his roles in Bareilly Ki Barfi, Bahut Hua Samman, Kanpuriye, Ghar waapsi, Love J Action, The Forgotten Army, jogira sara ra ra and Jabariya Jodi.

== Early life and education ==
Chaudhary was born in Etawah. After his intermediate, he moved to Lucknow and did a certificate course in computers. He graduated from Kanpur university and National School of Drama (2011).

== Career ==
=== Started as a theatre actor ===
Chaudhary started doing theatre in 2003. He played characters in various plays at Sangeet Natak Akademi, Bharatendu Academy of Dramatic Arts and Rai Umanath Bali Auditorium. After NSD, he acted in musicals like Zangoora and Jhumroo.

=== Hindi film industry ===
Chaudhary made his debut in 2014 with the film Trip to Bhangarh. In the year 2017 he played major role in the film Bareilly Ki Barfi. He again played noted role in the film Kanpuriye and Jabariya Jodi in the year 2019. In 2020 he acted in the TV series The Forgotten Army and the film Bahut Hua Samman. He played one of the lead role in TV series Love J Action in 2021. He again played a key role in the film Rashtra Kavach Om in 2022.

== Filmography ==
Year	Film / Web series	Role	Notes	Ref.
2014	Trip to Bhangarh	Ashu		
2017	Bareilly Ki Barfi	Munna		
2019	Kanpuriye	Kajal Alias Peter		
2019	Jabariya Jodi	Mukesh		
2020	The Forgotten Army	Arshad		
2020	Bahut Hua Samman	Chandu Bhaiya		
2021	Love J Action	Vikrant		
2022	Rashtra Kavach Om	Arsalan		
2023	Boond	Raghu		
2023	Pyaar Hai Toh Hai	Badri Bhaiya		
2023	Gadar 2	Major Malik		
2025	Shaila	Kunal		
2026	Ginny Wedss Sunny 2			
