= Ginny Weds Sunny =

2020 Indian film by Puneet Khanna

- Netflix release poster
- Directed by: Puneet Khanna
- Written by: Navjot Gulati; Sumit Arora
- Produced by: Vinod Bachchan
- Starring: Yami Gautam; Vikrant Massey
- Cinematography: Nuthan Nagaraj
- Edited by: Sandeep Sethy
- Music by: Songs: Payal Dev; Gaurav Chatterji; Jaan Nissar Lone; Background Score: Prasad Sashte
- Production company: Soundrya Production
- Distributed by: Netflix
- Release date: 9 October 2020
- Running time: 126 minutes
- Country: India
- Language: Hindi

Ginny Weds Sunny is a 2020 Indian Hindi romantic comedy film starring Yami Gautam as Ginny and Vikrant Massey as Sunny. It is directed by debutant Puneet Khanna and produced by Vinod Bachchan.

The film was announced on 11 July 2019, and principal photography began on 20 September; it was shot in Delhi, Noida, Ghaziabad and Manali. The filming was wrapped up in November 2019. Due to the COVID-19 pandemic, the film was released on 9 October 2020 on Netflix.

== Plot ==
Simran "Ginny" Juneja (Yami Gautam) lives in Delhi with her mother, Shobha Juneja (Ayesha Raza Mishra), a matchmaker who is constantly trying to find a suitable husband for her daughter. However, Ginny scares away potential grooms with her unconventional conditions, including strict plans for children, mandatory medical checkups, and a "test drive" period before marriage. Despite her mother's efforts, Ginny wants a love marriage and remains emotionally attached to her former boyfriend, Nishant Rathee (Suhail Nayyar), even though they claim to be just friends.

Meanwhile, Satnam "Sunny" Sethi (Vikrant Massey) has lost faith in love and simply wants to get married and settle down. A talented cook, Sunny dreams of opening his own restaurant. His father, Pappi Sethi (Rajiv Gupta), promises financial support for the restaurant if Sunny gets married.

Through mutual connections, Shobha suggests Sunny as a match for Ginny. Although Sunny already has a crush on her, Ginny barely notices him. Determined to make the match work, Shobha secretly helps Sunny create opportunities to spend time with Ginny. He begins taking the same metro as her, assists her with work-related targets, joins environmental activities she cares about, and gradually becomes a regular presence in her life.

Despite several awkward and unsuccessful attempts to impress her, Sunny slowly wins Ginny's friendship. As they spend more time together, Ginny opens up about her late father and her past relationships. During a trip to Mussoorie, the two grow especially close, and Sunny eventually proposes to her. Just as he is about to kiss her, Nishant unexpectedly arrives.

Realizing he still has feelings for Ginny, Nishant proposes to her in front of Sunny without even waiting for her response. Heartbroken, Sunny leaves. Over time, Ginny begins to understand that Nishant is indecisive and wants her to fit into his lifestyle, whereas Sunny accepts her exactly as she is.

When Ginny attempts to reconnect with Sunny, he tells her to return only when she is certain about what she truly wants. Eventually, Ginny rejects Nishant, recognizing that their relationship is no longer right for her.

However, complications arise when Ginny discovers that her mother and Sunny had been secretly orchestrating many of their encounters. Feeling manipulated and betrayed, she angrily cuts ties with Sunny and declares she will never marry him.

Believing he has lost Ginny forever, Sunny agrees to marry another woman, Neha. Meanwhile, Nishant apologizes to Ginny and admits that Sunny genuinely loves her. Realizing her true feelings, Ginny finally understands that she loves Sunny too.

On the eve of his wedding, Sunny recreates Ginny's favorite birthday traditions, including celebrating at an orphanage and taking her to a Gurudwara for the first time since her father's death. These gestures help Ginny fully accept her feelings for him.

The next morning, Ginny confesses her love. The couple decides to call off Sunny's wedding to Neha, but Neha's influential family reacts angrily and threatens both families if the marriage is cancelled.

The wedding proceeds, with the bride's face hidden beneath a veil. At the ceremony, it is revealed that Ginny and Neha secretly switched places after Ginny convinced Neha not to go through with a marriage she didn't truly want. Sunny unknowingly marries Ginny, while Neha explains to her family that this decision is best for everyone involved.

The film ends with Sunny and Ginny finally united, having overcome misunderstandings, manipulation, and family pressure to find their way to each other.

== Cast ==
- Yami Gautam as Simran Juneja (Ginny)
- Vikrant Massey as Satnam Sethi (Sunny)
- Ayesha Raza Mishra as Shobha Juneja
- Suhail Nayyar as Nishant Rathee
- Rajiv Gupta as Pappi Sethi
- Mazel Vyas as Nimmi Sethi
- Maneka Kurup Arora as Rita Sethi
- Gurpreet Saini as Sumit
- Sanchita Puri as Prerna
- Mansi Sharma as Manpreet
- Karan Singh Chhabra as Timmy
- Isha Talwar as Neha Gulati
- Venus Singh as Sanya Malhotra
- Deepak Chadha as Gulshan Gulati
- Munish Dev Mohan as Ramesh Gulati
- Mayank Chaudhary as Bittoo
- Aniket Kumar as Abhijit Singh
- Mika Singh as a special appearance in the song "Sawan Mein Lag Gayi Aag"
- Neha Kakkar as a special appearance in the song "Sawan Mein Lag Gayi Aag"
- Badshah as a special appearance in the song "Sawan Mein Lag Gayi Aag"

== Production ==
The movie was announced on 11 July 2019 with a cast including Yami Gautam and Vikrant Massey. It was directed by Puneet Khanna and produced by Vinod Bachchan under Soundrya Production. Navjot Gulati wrote the story and Sumit Arora wrote the dialogues. It marks Khanna's directorial debut. Sony Music India was roped in as the official music partner.

Filming started on 20 September 2019 in Delhi, then the film was shot in Noida, Ghaziabad and Manali. In Ghaziabad, the movie was shot in Raj Nagar Sector 5 and in Sector 4 Central Park along with several other places as small references. Shooting ended in November 2019.

== Release ==
Due to the COVID-19 pandemic, the film was released on 9 October 2020 on Netflix.

On the review aggregator website Rotten Tomatoes, 18% of 11 critics' reviews are positive, with an average rating of 3.8/10.

== Soundtrack ==
Ginny Weds Sunny

Soundtrack album by Payal Dev, Gaurav Chatterji and Jaan Nissar Lone
- Released: 28 September 2020
- Recorded: 2019
- Genre: Feature film soundtrack
- Length: 20:12
- Language: Hindi
- Label: Sony Music India

The soundtrack was composed by Payal Dev, Gaurav Chatterji and Jaan Nissar Lone while the lyrics were written by Kunaal Vermaa, Mohsin Shaikh, Payal Dev, Badshah, Sandeep Gaur, and Peer Zahoor.

The song "Sawan Mein Lag Gayi Aag" is from an original album of the same title by Mika Singh in 1998, composed and written by him. This is the second time the song is being recreated after 2008's film Woodstock Villa which was sung by Mika Singh. Later the song was recreated again by Mika Singh for the 2020s film Indoo Ki Jawani, as "Hasina Pagal Deewani", sung by Mika Singh and Asees Kaur.

Track listing
No.	Title	Lyrics	Music	Singer(s)	Length
1.	"LOL"	Kunaal Vermaa	Payal Dev	Payal Dev, Dev Negi	3:02
2.	"Sawan Mein Lag Gayi Aag"	Mohsin Shaikh, Payal Dev, Badshah	Payal Dev	Mika Singh, Neha Kakkar, Badshah	3:46
3.	"Phir Chala"	Kunaal Vermaa	Payal Dev	Jubin Nautiyal	4:24
4.	"Phoonk Phoonk"	Sandeep Gaur	Gaurav Chatterji	Neeti Mohan, Jatinder Singh, Harjot Dhillon	4:58
5.	"Rubaru"	Peer Zahoor	Jaan Nissar Lone	Kamal Khan	4:02
Total length:					20:12

== Sequel ==
On 14 May 2025, a Spiritual sequel titled Ginny Wedss Sunny 2 was announced starring Avinash Tiwary and Medha Shankr directed by Prasshant Jha, and produced by Vinod Bachchan under the banner of Soundrya Production. The film was released on 24 April 2026.
