= Pyaar Hai Toh Hai =

Indian Hindi-language film

- Directed by: Pradeep R.K. Chaudhary
- Written by: Mukul Shrama and Divya Pande
- Story by: Mukul Sharma
- Produced by: Sanjjeev Kumar and Randhir Kumar
- Starring: Karan Hariharan; Paanie Kashyap; Abishek Duhan; Veen Harsh; Rohit Chaudhary
- Cinematography: Sunita Radia
- Edited by: Vikash
- Music by: Anique and Bobby-Imran
- Production company: Shreetara Cinevision Pvt Ltd
- Distributed by: Jai Viratra Entertainment Limited
- Release date: 20 October 2023
- Country: India
- Language: Hindi

Pyaar Hai Toh Hai is a 2023 Indian Hindi-language film starring Karan Hariharan and Paani Kashyap produced by Shreetara Cinevision Pvt Ltd. It was released in theaters on 20 October 2023.

== Synopsis ==
The film revolves around the intense and thrilling journey of two childhood friends, Arman (Karan Hariharan) and Nimmo (Paanie Kashyap).

== Cast ==
- Karan Hariharan as Arman
- Paanie Kashyap as Nimmo
- Abhishek Duhan as Vikas
- Veen Harsh as Sikander
- Rohit Chaudhary as Badri Bhaiya

== Production ==
Under the Banner of Shreetara Cinevision Pvt Ltd, the film is a theatrical musical romantic drama produced by Sanjeev Kumar & Randhir Kumar, Co-produced by Sunita Radia & Arun Tyagi and directed by Pradeep R.K. Chaudhary. The film has been shot at various location of Rishikesh, Dehradun and Mussoorie.
