= Ginny Wedss Sunny 2 =

2026 Indian film by Prasshant Jha

- Theatrical release poster
- Directed by: Prasshant Jha
- Written by: Prasshant Jha
- Produced by: Vinod Bachchan; Umesh Kumar Bansal
- Starring: Avinash Tiwary; Medha Shankr
- Cinematography: Archit Patel
- Edited by: Bunty Nagi
- Music by: Heer, Amaan Noor; Usman Khan; Sushant-Shankar; Siddhant Kaushal; Haroon-Gavin
- Production companies: Soundrya Production; Zee Studios
- Distributed by: Zee Studios
- Release date: 24 April 2026
- Running time: 133 minutes
- Country: India
- Language: Hindi
- Budget: ₹35 crore
- Box office: est. ₹1.99 crore

Ginny Wedss Sunny 2 is a 2026 Indian Hindi-language romantic comedy film written and directed by Prasshant Jha. Produced under Soundrya Production and Zee Studios, the film stars Avinash Tiwary and Medha Shankr. It is a spiritual sequel to Ginny Weds Sunny (2020). The film was released theatrically on 24 April 2026.

== Premise ==
A solitary wrestler (Avinash Tiwary) re-evaluates his life when a young bachelorette crashes into his life and challenges his core assumptions, that's when he meets Ginny

== Cast ==
- Avinash Tiwary as Shivansh "Sunny" Chaturvedi
- Medha Shankr as Geetanjali "Ginny" Goenka
- Lillete Dubey as Neelu
- Sudhir Pandey as Ram Sewak
- Govind Namdev as Ayodhya Prakash
- Gopi Bhalla as Sugriv uncle
- Rohit Chaudhary as Rudranarayan D'Costa
- Nayani Dixit as Sarika
- Vishwanath Chatterjee as Purshram aka Pintu
- Preetika Pahwa as Sukriti

== Production ==
=== Development ===
The film was officially announced by Zee Studios, with Prashant Jha serving as writer and director, while Soundrya Production managed the production.

=== Casting ===
Avinash Tiwary and Medha Shankr were cast in the lead roles. Lillete Dubey, Sudhir Pandey, Govind Namdev, Gopi Bhalla, Rohit Chaudhary, Nayani Dixit, Vishwanath Chatterjee, and Preetika Pahwa were added to the cast.

=== Filming ===
Pre-production began in March 2025. Principal photography began in May 2025 and concluded in July 2025 taking place in Uttarakhand.

== Soundtrack ==
Ginny Wedss Sunny 2

Soundtrack album by Heer, Amaan Noor, Usman Khan, Sushant-Shankar, Siddhant Kaushal and Haroon-Gavin
- Released: April 20, 2026
- Genre: Feature film soundtrack
- Length: 27:03
- Language: Hindi
- Label: Sony Music India

Official audio
- Ginny Wedss Sunny 2 – Full Album on YouTube

Track listing
No.	Title	Lyrics	Music	Singer(s)	Length
1.	"Chhaap Tilak"	Amaan Noor, Amir Khusro	Heer, Amaan Noor	Heer, Paradox	4:05
2.	"Aye Khuda"	Usman Khan	Usman Khan	Altamash Faridi	3:45
3.	"Tumpe Hi Pyaar Aa Gaya"	Kumaar	Sushant-Shankar	Sonu Nigam	5:09
4.	"Tu Naa Jaane Ye"	Kumaar	Sushant-Shankar	Sushant Rinkoo	3:40
5.	"Jappi Jawan"	Devendra Kafir	Sushant-Shankar	Javed Ali, Prateeksha Shrivastava	4:01
6.	"Bad Luck Kharab"	Siddhant Kaushal	Haroon-Gavin	Vijay Yamla, Swati Sharma, Kalpana Gandharva	2:36
7.	"Jaan Kadd Ke"	Devendra Kafir	Sushant-Shankar	Divya Kumar, Sakshi Holkar	3:47
Total length:					27:03

== Release ==
The film was theatrically released on 24 April 2026. On the review aggregator website Rotten Tomatoes, 10% of 10 critics' reviews are positive, with an average rating of 3.8/10.

Firstpost's Lachmi Deb Roy rated the film 2.75 out of 5, praising the chemistry between Tiwary and Shankr, the supporting cast and the film's simplicity, while noting its predictability and dialogue-heavy writing. Dhaval Roy of The Times of India rated the film 2 out of 5, finding its premise promising and performances sincere but criticising the uneven writing and romance. Rishabh Suri of Hindustan Times rated it 2.5 out of 5, describing it as occasionally funny and easy to watch while finding the narrative repetitive.

Rahul Desai of The Hollywood Reporter India criticised the film's humour, characterisation and score. Shubhra Gupta of The Indian Express rated the film 1 out of 5 and criticised its writing, songs and treatment of its central themes. Sana Farzeen of India Today rated the film 2 out of 5, describing its narrative as scattered and clichéd.

DNA India later reported a top-five placement lasting more than three weeks upon its home media release.
