= Hum Do Hamare Do =

2021 Indian film by Abhishek Jain

- Official release poster
- Directed by: Abhishek Jain
- Written by: Prasshant Jha
- Story by: Abhishek Jain; Deepak Venkateshan
- Produced by: Dinesh Vijan
- Starring: Rajkummar Rao; Kriti Sanon; Paresh Rawal; Ratna Pathak Shah
- Cinematography: Amalendu Chaudhary
- Edited by: Dev Rao Jadhav
- Music by: Sachin–Jigar
- Production company: Maddock Originals
- Distributed by: Disney+ Hotstar
- Release date: 29 October 2021
- Running time: 129 minutes
- Country: India
- Language: Hindi

Hum Do Hamare Do (transl. Two of us, two of ours) is a 2021 Indian Hindi-language comedy film directed by Abhishek Jain and produced by Dinesh Vijan. The film stars Rajkummar Rao, Kriti Sanon, Paresh Rawal and Ratna Pathak Shah. Aparshakti Khurana, Manu Rishi, Prachee Shah Paandya and Saanand Verma play supporting roles.

The film was officially announced in February 2020 with Rao, Sanon, Rawal and Dimple Kapadia in lead roles. Later after the production was deferred due to COVID-19 pandemic, Kapadia quit the film and was replaced by Pathak Shah. After being postponed for over six months due to the pandemic, the Principal photography finally begun on 30 October 2020 in Chandigarh.

Initially slated for theatrical release, the decision was later dropped due to the second wave of the pandemic. Then it was directly released online on Disney+ Hotstar on 29 October 2021.

== Plot ==
Dhruv Shikhar is an orphan who used to work at Purushottam's dhaba. After becoming an adult, he became an entrepreneur and falls in love with Aanya Mehra, whom he first met at his Virtual reality app launch event. They soon become friends and then, friendship turns into love. He gets to know from her that she would like to marry a guy with a sweet family and a pet dog. She also tells him that her parents, Anand Mehra and Yamini Mehra, died in a theater fire when she was seven years old after which she started living with her aunt, Roopa Mehra and uncle, Dr. Sanjeev Mehra.

With the help of his best friend Sandeep aka Shunty, and a creepy marriage broker Joginder Arora aka Shaadiram, he unsuccessfully attempts to find fake parents to make a perfect family to impress Aanya. Then, he suddenly remembers Purushottam, who now lives in an old age home in some other city and goes to find him, along with Shunty. Their initial attempt at making Purushottam as his fake father fails, but somebody tells them about the only love of his life, Deepti Kashyap, who, because of his lack of confidence to elope, left him angrily and married another man. There too, they fail initially when they tell her that her pretend husband would be Purushottam. However, when Shunty tells her that she was the one who visited Purushottam's dhaba many years ago, when Dhruv used to work there, and gave Dhruv money to buy some new clothes for himself and asked him to change his name from "Bal Premi" to a better and more realistic name, she immediately agrees to act as Dhruv's fake mother. Seeing Deepti, Purushottam also agrees to act as his father, because even after all these years, he still loves her.

Soon they meet Aanya's parents and with a few lies in attempting to make it look like a true family, their marriage is fixed. Unfortunately, because of an accidental reveal of Dhruv being an orphan and his fake family, Aanya's family cancels the marriage on the Sangeet day. After the failed attempt at marriage, Aanya's angry uncle and aunt fix her marriage with somebody else.

On the other hand, because of living together for so long, Purushottam, Deepti and Dhruv start living like a real family. Seeing Dhruv's sorrow, his "parents" - Purushottam and Deepti go to apologize to the Mehra family and find out about her upcoming wedding with another man, and Dr. Sanjeev Mehra humiliates both of them. Dhruv learns of this, and tells his parents to forget about Aanya. In the end, it is because of Aanya's younger sister Kanika, that she understands that Dhruv is the right man for her, as he took the trouble of creating a whole family, simply for her. She then goes to him and proposes, and he finally agrees and they marry.

== Cast ==
- Rajkummar Rao as Dhruv Shikhar / Balpremi
- Kriti Sanon as Aanya Mehra
- Paresh Rawal as Purushottam Mishra/Premi
- Ratna Pathak Shah as Deepti Kashyap
- Aparshakti Khurana as Sandeep "Shunty Babu Naidu" Sachdeva
- Manu Rishi as Dr. Sanjeev Mehra
- Prachi Shah as Roopa Mehra
- Mazel Vyas as Kanika Mehra
- Saanand Verma as Joginder "Shaadiram" Arora
- Avijit Dutt as Jagmohan Diwan
- Shibani Bedi as Tara Sachdeva
- Himanshu Sharma as Rabban
- Varun Narang as Panelist

== Reception ==
=== Critical response ===
The film received mixed to negative reviews with praise directed towards its music, storyline and performances of Rawal and Shah but criticism directed towards its writing and overall execution. Saibal Chatterjee of NDTV gave the film 1.5 stars out of 5 and wrote, "Rajkummar Rao is saddled with the task of salvaging a poorly written protagonist whose impulses, compulsions and decisions border on the inexplicable." Shubham Kulkarni, Author at Koimoi gave 2.5 stars out of 5 and wrote, "It's a reminder of why we need to bring back the veterans and give them characters they can blow." Prathyush Parasuraman of Firstpost gave a rating of 3/5 and wrote," Hum Do Hamare Do holds weak foundations with lazy character detailing but is saved by a better second-half." Shubhra Gupta of The Indian Express gave 1.5 stars and wrote, "The only ones who occasionally make feeble attempts to rise above this muddle are Ratna Pathak Shah and Paresh Rawal, and should have been given more to do." Stutee Ghosh from The Quint gave 2.5 stars and said, "For a film that couldn't make the man do the obvious thing and speak up, the makers manage to regurgitate every other trope to make the story move along." Hiren Kotwani of The Times of India gave 3 stars out of 5 and wrote, "Hum Do Hamare Do is a decent watch... but if only the second half had been more engaging with a few dollops more of humour." Sukanya Verma from Rediff.com gave 2 stars and said, "Hum Do Hamare Do is the kind of rush job rom-com that cuts to the chase after so much dillydallying and in such a dull manner, it completely misses the point." Nayandeep Rakshit from Bollywood Bubble gave 3.5 stars out of 5 and wrote, "The movie has the perfect blend of the navras – you smile, you laugh, you enjoy and you cry, all along with them. The songs are beautifully positioned although they aren’t the highlight of the film." Himesh Mankad of Pinkvilla gave the film 2.5 stars out of 5 and wrote, "Hum Do Hamare Do is made with the right intent, however, the premise had the potential of more humour through the narrative and required a rather nuanced approach in terms of emotions in the last 25 minutes." Bollywood Hungama gave 2.5 stars and stated,"Hum Do Hamare Do rests on a great plot and fine performances but the average script and weak climax diminishes the impact."

== Soundtrack ==
Hum Do Hamare Do

Soundtrack album by Sachin–Jigar
- Released: 21 October 2021
- Recorded: 2021
- Genre: Feature film soundtrack
- Length: 22:19
- Language: Hindi
- Label: Zee Music Company

Sachin–Jigar chronology
Shiddat (2021)	Hum Do Hamare Do (2021)	Chandigarh Kare Aashiqui (2021)

Official audio
- Hum Do Hamare Do - Full Album on YouTube

The film's music was composed by Sachin–Jigar while the lyrics were written by Shellee.

Track listing
No.	Title	Singer(s)	Length
1.	"Bansuri"	Asees Kaur, IP Singh, Dev Negi, Madhubanti Bagchi, Sachin–Jigar	2:47
2.	"Kamli"	Jubin Nautiyal, Divya Kumar, Sachin–Jigar	3:11
3.	"Mauj - E - Karam"	Sachet Tandon, Parampara Tandon, Sachin–Jigar	3:53
4.	"Raula Pae Gayaa"	Daler Mehndi, Sachin–Jigar	3:31
5.	"Dum Gutkoon"	Master Saleem, Divya Kumar, Sachin–Jigar	5:15
6.	"Vedha Sajjeyaa"	Rekha Bhardwaj, Varun Jain, Sachin–Jigar	3:42
Total length:			22:19
