= Zila Ghaziabad =

2013 film directed by Anand Kumar

- Theatrical release poster
- Directed by: Anand Kumar
- Written by: Vinay Sharma
- Produced by: Vinod Bachan
- Starring: Sanjay Dutt; Arshad Warsi; Vivek Oberoi; Charmy Kaur; Minissha Lamba; Ravi Kishan; Paresh Rawal; Sunil Grover
- Cinematography: N. K. Ekambaram
- Music by: Songs: Amjad Nadeem; Background Score: Amar Mohile
- Production company: Soundrya Production
- Distributed by: Showman International
- Release date: 22 February 2013
- Running time: 143 minutes
- Country: India
- Language: Hindi

Zila Ghaziabad (transl. Ghaziabad district) is a 2013 Indian Hindi-language political action thriller film directed by Anand Kumar. It was produced by Vinod Bachan, and presented by Mohammed Fasih and Bharat Shah. The film features Sanjay Dutt, Vivek Oberoi, Arshad Warsi, Charmy Kaur, Minissha Lamba, Ravi Kishan, Paresh Rawal and Sunil Grover in lead roles amongst others. The film also featured Shriya Saran and Geeta Basra for a special appearance. It was based on the true story of the gang wars of Ghaziabad. It was released on 22 February 2013. Upon release, the film received mixed reviews.

A full-blown gang war comes to life in the district of Ghaziabad with the rise of the rivalry between gangsters Fauji and Satbir. A corrupt policeman, Pritam Singh, is sent down to set things right.

The film is based on the true story of the gang war that lasted between two groups in the 80s and 90s in Ghaziabad, India.

== Synopsis ==
In the town of Ghaziabad, Brahmapal Choudhary (Paresh Rawal) is a corrupt chairman and has connections with the gangster Fauji (Arshad Warsi), who is willing to do anything to make a quick buck. When Brahmapal refuses to pay up to $2 million for Fauji's sister's wedding, Fauji breaks their ties and leaves him. At the same time, Brahmapal befriends a polite teacher named Satbir (Vivek Oberoi), who also happens to be in a relationship with Brahmapal's daughter Suman (Charmy Kaur).

Thinking that Brahmapal has replaced him with Satbir, Fauji becomes furious and joins forces with Rashid (Ravi Kishan), a politician and Brahmapal's rival.

== Cast ==
- Sanjay Dutt as Inspector Thakur Pritam Singh, a police officer tasked with putting an end to the gang war in Ghaziabad
- Vivek Oberoi as Satbir Baisla Gurjar, A teacher-turned-Gangster, Fauji's arch-rival, Suman's love-interest and later husband
- Arshad Warsi as Mahendra Fauji Baisla, A gangster, Satbir's arch-rival, the main antagonist of the film
- Ashutosh Kaushik as Pandit, one of Fauji's henchmen
- Ravi Kishan as Rashid, Jagmal’s political rival who joins hands with Fauji
- Charmy Kaur as Suman Chaudhary, Jagmal's daughter, Satbir's love interest and later wife
- Sunil Grover as Fakirchand Baisla (Faqira), One of Fauji's Henchmen and Jagmal's brother-in-law
- Paresh Rawal as Chairman Jagmal, mafia Don of Ghaziabad, Rashid's political rival, Suman's father
- Minissha Lamba as Kavita, Fauji's girlfriend
- Chandrachur Singh as Karambir Baisla fauji, Satbir and Ombir's older brother
- Ashutosh Rana as Sangram Singh
- Zarina Wahab as Satbir's mother
- Eijaz Khan as Ombir Singh baisla, Karambir and Satbir's younger brother
- Parth Sharma as Robin Singh
- Geeta Khanna as Rashid's mother
- Divya Dutta as Mahenderi
- Raju Mavani as Sadhu Singh
- Khushboo Kamal
- Shriya Saran in "Chamiya No 1" item number (cameo appearance)
- Geeta Basra in "Baap ka Maal" item number (cameo appearance)

== Music ==
Zila Ghaziabad

Soundtrack album by Amzad-Nadeem
- Released: January 2013
- Genre: Feature film soundtrack
- Label: T-Series

Amzad-Nadeem chronology
Zila Ghaziabad (2013)	Zindagi 50-50 (2013)

The soundtrack of Zila Ghaziabad is composed by Amjad Nadeem, with Bappa Lahiri, son of famous music composer Bappi Lahiri composing "Tu Hain Rab Mera" and "Chamiya No. 1", which initially titled as "Main Item No.1 Hoon". The album contains five tracks. Lyrics by Shabbir Ahmed.

No.	Title	Singer(s)	Length
1.	"Ye Hai Zila Ghaziabad"	Sukhwinder Singh, Chorus	5:22
2.	"Ranjha Jogi"	Sonu Nigam, Shreya Ghoshal	4:11
3.	"Baap Ka Maal"	Sukhwinder Singh, Mika Singh, Mamta Sharma	5:22
4.	"Tu Hai Rab Mera"	Mohit Chauhan, Tulsi Kumar	4:49
5.	"Chamiya No 1"	Sunidhi Chauhan, Shabab Sabri, Chorus	4:32
6.	"Baap Ka Maal (Rock Again)"	Mika Singh, Anupama Raag	5:33

== Reception ==
Zila Ghaziabad received negative reviews from critics. Roshni Devi from Koimoi gave it 2 star and called it "almost entirely bad" except Arshad Warsi's and Sanjay Dutt acting and a few sequences. Taran Adarsh from Bollywood Hungama gave it 2.5 stars.
