= Delhii Heights =

Dehlii Heights
- Directed by: Anand Kumar
- Written by: Sanyukta Chawla; Rajesh Chawla
- Produced by: Prabhu
- Starring: Jimmy Sheirgill; Neha Dhupia; Om Puri; Rohit Roy; Simone Singh
- Edited by: A. Sreekar Prasad
- Music by: Rabbi Shergill
- Production company: Sivaji Productions
- Distributed by: Madhu Entertainment
- Release date: 30 March 2007
- Running time: 120 minutes
- Country: India
- Language: Hindi
- Budget: ₹ 4.25 crore
- Box office: ₹ 99 lakh

Delhii Heights is a 2007 Indian Hindi-language drama film written and directed by Anand Kumar and produced by Sivaji Productions. It stars Jimmy Sheirgill and Neha Dhupia, with Om Puri, Rohit Roy, Simone Singh, Vivek Shauq, and Kamini Khanna playing supporting roles. With Delhii Heights, Rabbi Shergill made his debut in films as a music director and lyrics writer.

== Plot ==
Delhii Heights is a high-rise apartment in Delhi, where Abheer (Jimmy Sheirgill) and his wife (Neha Dhupia) live, a married couple who work for rival companies. It's about how their professional lives affect their personal ones. Also, there lives Timmy Kohli (Om Puri), a fun loving Sikh, with his wife Ruby (Kamini Khanna) and two daughters, Sweety (Sakshi Gulati) and (Shaina Ahluwalia). Then there is Bobby (Rohit Roy) and his wife Saima (Simone Singh). Bobby is a compulsive flirt and his wife knows about it. How things take place and how their lives change is to be seen.

Other characters include Lucky (Vivek Shauq), is a cricket bookie, and four boys (Mohit Sehgal, Anuj Sachdeva and Kinshuk Mahajan), residents of Delhii Heights, who keep running after girls and pulling each other's legs.

== Cast ==
- Jimmy Sheirgill as Abheer
- Neha Dhupia as Suhana
- Om Puri as Timmy
- Rohit Roy as Bobby
- Vivek Shauq as Lucky
- Simone Singh as Saima
- Kamini Khanna as Ruby
- Arun Thapar as Rohan
- Kinshuk Mahajan
- Mohit Sehgal
- Anuj Sachdeva
- Sakshi Gulati as Sweety
- Shaina Ahluwalia as Timmy's 2nd daughter
- R. Madhavan as himself (cameo appearance)
- Nitish Bharadwaj (cameo appearance)

== Production ==
The film's screenplay and dialogues were written by Samyukta Chawla, cinematography by Aatish Parmar, art by Sonal, editing by Shrikar Prasad, costumes by Hari Nakai and Varun Bahl, choreography by Remo D'Souza and stunts by Action Prakash, are the other credits. Madhavan was signed on to play a cameo role as himself.

== Soundtrack ==
- Tere Bin by Rabbi Shergill
- Kitni Der Tak by Sonu Nigam & Rabbi Shergill
- Aey Gori rang de choliya by Kailash Kher & Sonu Kakkar
- Aaja Nachle by Salim Shahzada
- Sivaji Productions held the music launch of the film at Taj Lands End. The album was unveiled by the chief guests, filmmaker Ramesh Sippy and Rajkumar Santoshi.

== Release ==
The film opened on 30 March 2007 to negative reviews from critics. Reviewer Raja Sen from Rediff.com noted "there's precious little to watch in this haphazardly put together tale of predictable pitfalls" and that "the characters are barely written, and coupled with a set of superlatively poor actors, this is a tiresome watch." Another critic from the Hindustan Times noted that the film "leaves you with a severe case of shivers, shudders and frights." Another critic Rajeev Masand wrote "it’s a mangled mess of a film that can really come of only one good use — therapists could use it as a test of patience for people working on their anger management."
