= Dakina Dakina Mal =

- Sinhala: දකින දකින මල්
- Directed by: V. Sivadasan
- Written by: Nihal Bandara
- Produced by: Sunil T. Films
- Starring: Roger Seneviratne; Semini Iddamalgoda; Roshan Pilapitiya
- Cinematography: Norbert Rathnasiri
- Edited by: Asun Malwaththa
- Music by: Somapala Rathnayake
- Release date: 23 April 2010
- Country: Sri Lanka
- Language: Sinhala

Dakina Dakina Mal (Sinhala: දකින දකින මල්) is a 2010 Sri Lankan Sinhala romantic film directed by V. Sivadasan and produced by Sunil T. Fernando for Sunil T. Films. It stars Roger Seneviratne and Semini Iddamalgoda in lead roles along with Roshan Pilapitiya and Damitha Abeyratne. Music composed by Somapala Rathnayake and Mohan Raj. It is the 1165th Sri Lankan film in the Sinhala cinema. It is a remake of 2007 Kollywood film Pachaikili Muthucharam, which itself was remake of English movie Derailed.

== Cast ==
- Roger Seneviratne as Kumar
- Semini Iddamalgoda as Chamathka
- Damitha Abeyratne as Mandakini
- Roshan Pilapitiya as Aravinda
- Udeni Alwis
- Nilanthi Dias
- Sahan Wijesinghe
- Kapila Sigera
- Sarath Silva
- Hemantha Iriyagama

== Soundtrack ==
| No. | Title | Singer(s) | Length |
|---|---|---|---|
| 1. | "Dahasak Ranwan Siyapath" | Nirosha Virajini, Jayantha Rathnayake |
| 2. | "Hurathal Hurathal Wenne" | Nirosha Virajini, Mohan Raj |
| 3. | "Dakina Dakina Mal" | Nirosha Virajini |
