= Sayali Bhagat =

Indian actress and former beauty queen

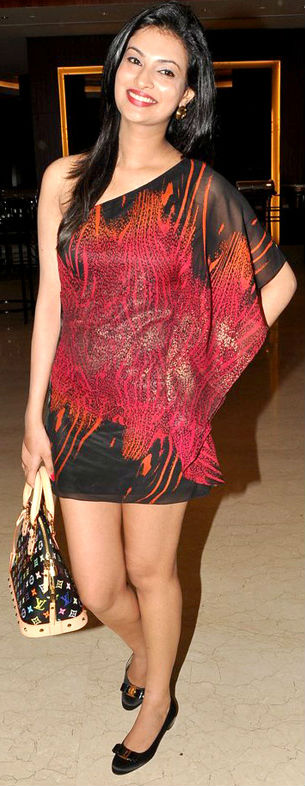
- Sayali in 2012
- Born: Nashik, Maharashtra
- Education: Fravashi Academy, Alkesh Dinesh Mody Institute
- Occupations: Actress, model
- Years active: 2007–2016
- Title: Femina Miss India
- Spouse: Navneet Pratap Singh Yadav (m. 2013)
- Children: 1

Sayali Bhagat is an Indian actress and beauty pageant titleholder. She won the title of Femina Miss India World title in 2004 and represented India at Miss World.

== Early life ==
She studied at Fravashi Academy, Nasik, and completed her graduation in BMS (Bachelor of Management Studies) from Alkesh Dinesh Mody Institute for Financial and Management Studies.

== Career ==
Her initial modeling assignments were for Dentzz, SNDT College show and Swarovski gems fashion show. The Train: Some Lines Should Never Be Crossed was her first Hindi film, co-starring Emraan Hashmi and Geeta Basra. The movie was released on 8 July 2007. She also appeared as a journalist from Singapore, who pretends to interview Indian cricketer Rahul Dravid on the show MTV Bakra. In 2009, she was in the Hindi movie Paying Guests, opposite Javed Jaffrey.

Femina Miss India

She participated Femina Miss India pageant and won the Femina Miss India Earth in 2004.

== Personal life ==
According to media reports in late 2000s, Bhagat was romantically linked with Pakistani cricketer Shoaib Malik, but she called the rumors as publicity stunt to promote her and Malik's under-production film (which was shortly after shelved indefinitely). Malik also denied any relationship with Bhagat beyond their professional lives.

On 10 December 2013, Bhagat had an arranged marriage with Haryana-based businessman Navneet Pratap Singh Yadav. The couple has a daughter named Ivankaa Singh.

== Filmography ==
=== Films ===
| Year | Film | Role | Language | Notes |
|---|---|---|---|---|
| 2007 | The Train | Anjali Dixit | Hindi | |
| 2008 | Good Luck | Saba Sharma | Hindi | |
| 2008 | Halla Bol | Herself | Hindi | Special appearance in the song "Is Pal Ki Soch" |
| 2008 | Blade Babji | Archana | Telugu | |
| 2009 | Newtonin Moondram Vidhi | Priya | Tamil | |
| 2009 | Kirkit | | Hindi | |
| 2009 | Paying Guests | Seema | Hindi | |
| 2009 | Jail | Item dancer | Hindi | |
| 2010 | Inkosaari | Herself | Telugu | Special appearance in the song "He He Everybody" |
| 2010 | The Saint Who Thought Otherwise | Sangeeta Kadam | English | |
| 2010 | Main Rony Aur Rony | | Hindi | |
| 2011 | Impatient Vivek | Shruti | Hindi | |
| 2011 | Naughty @ 40 | Woman who rejects Sanjeev | Hindi | |
| 2012 | Ghost | Suhani | Hindi | |
| 2012 | This Weekend | Divya | Hindi | |
| 2013 | Rajdhani Express | Reena | Hindi | |
| 2013 | Chaloo Movie | | Hindi | |
| 2013 | Samadhi | Jhinuk | Bengali | |
| 2014 | Yaariyan | Nikki | Hindi | |
| 2015 | Myself Pendu | Punjabi kudi | Punjabi | |
| 2016 | Home Stay | | Kannada; Hindi | Bilingual film |
| 2016 | Dhigil | | Tamil | |

=== Television ===
- 2008: Fear Factor: Khatron Ke Khiladi 1 as contestant (14th place)

| Preceded by Ami Vashi | Femina Miss India World; 2004 | Succeeded by Sindhura Gadde |
