= Derailed (2005 film) =

2005 film by Mikael Håfström

- Theatrical release poster
- Directed by: Mikael Håfström
- Screenplay by: Stuart Beattie
- Based on: Derailed by James Siegel
- Produced by: Lorenzo di Bonaventura
- Starring: Clive Owen; Jennifer Aniston; Vincent Cassel; Melissa George; Addison Timlin; Xzibit; RZA
- Cinematography: Peter Biziou
- Edited by: Peter Boyle
- Music by: Edward Shearmur
- Production companies: Miramax Films; Di Bonaventura Pictures; Patalex Productions
- Distributed by: The Weinstein Company (North America); Buena Vista International (International)
- Release date: November 11, 2005 (United States)
- Running time: 106 minutes (Full screen theatrical version); 112 minutes (Widescreen unrated version)
- Countries: United Kingdom; United States
- Language: English
- Budget: $22 million
- Box office: $57.5 million

Derailed is a 2005 crime thriller film directed by Mikael Håfström and written by Stuart Beattie, based on the 2003 novel of the same name by James Siegel. Starring Clive Owen, Jennifer Aniston, Vincent Cassel, Melissa George, Giancarlo Esposito, David Morrissey, RZA, and Xzibit, the film follows Charles Schine and Lucinda Harris who are having an extramarital affair and are assaulted and robbed by Philippe LaRoche in a hotel room. When LaRoche later threatens to kill Charles's family unless he pays him a ransom, Charles finds himself the victim of a conspiracy.

Derailed was theatrically released in the United States on November 11, 2005, receiving mixed-to-negative reviews from critics. Despite this, the film was a modest box office success, grossing $57.5 million against its $22 million production budget. This was the first film to be released by The Weinstein Company in the United States.

== Plot ==
Chicago advertising executive Charles Schine lives with his wife Deanna and their daughter Amy, who suffers from type 1 diabetes, which requires expensive medical treatment.

On a commuter train to work one morning, Charles meets Lucinda Harris, a financial advisor who is married with a daughter. The two begin meeting and one evening decide to take a room in a cheap hotel. As they are undressing, an armed man bursts into their room and robs them and beats Charles, and then brutally rapes Lucinda. Not wanting her husband to learn of her affair, Lucinda persuades Charles not to report the crime and they go their separate ways.

Days later, the man, who identifies himself as Philippe LaRoche, contacts Charles and threatens to kill his family if he does not pay him $20,000. He takes the money from their savings, goes to the meeting point and hands over the cash. LaRoche beats Charles for cancelling his credit cards. A month later, LaRoche calls again, this time demanding $100,000. Charles explains his situation to his work colleague Winston, an ex-con. Winston offers to scare off LaRoche for ten percent of the demanded payout. Charles embezzles $10,000 from his company and he and Winston plot to get the drop on LaRoche at the specified meeting location. However, LaRoche surprises them, shoots Winston dead, and takes the $10,000. Charles dumps the car with Winston's body into the river and later gives a false alibi when questioned by Detective Franklin Church.

Charles receives another call from LaRoche, saying he is holding Lucinda hostage and will kill her if he does not deliver the full $100,000. Charles takes the money from the account meant for his daughter's medical treatment, goes to Lucinda's apartment, and makes the payoff to LaRoche and his partner Dexter.

Charles visits Lucinda at her workplace but discovers that the woman he met is not the Lucinda Harris who works there but is actually called Jane and only worked there briefly as a temp. He reaches her apartment, which is now being shown to new prospective renters, and discovers that Jane's photograph of her purported daughter is actually a cut-out of a stock picture from a brochure.

Charles tracks Jane down, follows her, and sees her meeting and kissing LaRoche, learning she was in on the scam. He also observes her seducing another businessman, Sam. Determined to retrieve his stolen money, Charles rents a room at the same hotel as before and waits for Jane to arrive there with Sam, followed by LaRoche. Charles knocks LaRoche unconscious outside the hotel room door, disarms him, and bursts in, telling a confused Sam the scheme he has been set up for. Dexter arrives to back up LaRoche and when Sam tries to jump Charles a gunfight ensues, with everyone shot but Charles, who watches Jane die and then returns to his room. He convinces the police who have been called in that he was just a bystander. As he leaves, Charles claims his briefcase from the hotel safe and gets back his stolen money.

Back at his office, Charles finds his embezzlement has been discovered, and he is sentenced to six months of community service, teaching in a prison. During one of his classes, he comes across a notebook containing a story which relates all that has happened to him and leads him to find LaRoche, who had survived the gunfight and is one of the prisoners. Swearing revenge for the death of Jane, LaRoche threatens to continue to disrupt Charles' life, but Charles reveals that he has planned their encounter and stabs LaRoche to death with a shank he had smuggled in.

Charles walks away from the encounter by claiming to Detective Church that LaRoche attacked him and he reacted in self-defence. He returns to his family.

== Cast ==
- Clive Owen as Charles Schine
- Jennifer Aniston as Jane ("Lucinda Harris")
- Vincent Cassel as Philippe LaRoche
- Xzibit as Dexter
- RZA as Winston Boyko
- Melissa George as Deanna Schine
- Giancarlo Esposito as Detective Franklin Church
- David Morrissey as Sam Griffin
- Addison Timlin as Amy Schine
- Georgina Chapman as Candy
- Denis O'Hare as Jerry the Lawyer
- Tom Conti as Eliot Firth
- Rachael Blake as Susan Davis
- David Oyelowo as Patrol Officer
- Danny McCarthy as Correctional Officer Hank
- Ortis Deley as Cop
- Richard Leaf as Night Clerk Ray
- Catherine McCord as Avery Price Receptionist

== Reception ==
=== Box office ===
Derailed opened in 2,443 theaters for an opening weekend gross of $12,211,986. The film made a domestic gross of $36,024,076 and an international gross of $21,455,000, giving it a worldwide gross of $57,479,076.

=== Critical response ===
On the review aggregator website Rotten Tomatoes, 20% of 124 critics' reviews are positive, with an average rating of 4.7/10. The website's consensus reads: "With miscast stars, a ludicrous plot and an obvious twist, Derailed embodies its name all too aptly." Metacritic, which uses a weighted average, assigned the film a score of 40 out of 100, based on 34 critics, indicating "mixed or average" reviews.

Roger Ebert of the Chicago Sun-Times awarded the film two and a half out of four stars and believed that Owen's and Aniston's performances were intriguing. Ebert said, "Clive Owen was my candidate for James Bond, and can play hard and heartless rotters (see Closer), but here he is quiet and sad, with a sort of passivity. He lets his face relax into acceptance of his own bad fortune. Jennifer Aniston does that interesting thing of not being a stereotyped sexpot but being irresistibly intriguing. That works with a man like Charles. Happily married, in debt, worried about his daughter and his job, he would be impervious to a sexy slut."

== Soundtrack ==
Derailed OST

Film score by Ed Shearmur
- Released: November 8, 2005
- Genre: Score • Various
- Length: 38:40
- Label: Wu Music Group

Ed Shearmur chronology
The Skeleton Key (2005)	Derailed OST (2005)	The Ex (2006)

All tracks are written by Ed Shearmur.

No.	Title	Length
1.	"Winston's Theme (Orchestral)"	2:18
2.	"Charles' Theme (Orchestral)"	1:29
Total length:		3:47

=== Additional music by ===
No.	Title	Music	Length
1.	"Johnny"	Flemming Rasmussen	4:05
2.	"I Love You"	RZA	3:32
3.	"Sabotage"	Hot Will ft. Maurice	4:02
4.	"50 Ways to Leave Your Lover"	Paul Simon	4:02
5.	"Really Want None"	Freemurder	3:01
6.	"I'm Sorry"	Maurice	3:48
7.	"Better Man"	Maurice	4:06
8.	"My Lovin' Is Digi"	RZA	4:11
9.	"Better Man (Guitar Remix)"	Maurice	4:06
Total length:			36:03

== Remakes ==
In 2007, the novel was adapted into films in India in two languages: in Tamil as Pachaikili Muthucharam by Gautham Vasudev Menon and in Hindi as The Train. Pachakili Muthucharam was adapted into the Sinhala-language film Dakina Dakina Mal. In 2010, the film was remade in Ghana by filmmaker Frank Rajah Arase as Temptation. It stars Majid Michel and Frank Artus.

== See also ==
- List of films featuring diabetes
- List of American films of 2005
