= Vivekanand Education Society's Polytechnic College =

Vivekanand Education Society’s Polytechnic
- Type: College
- Established: 1983
- Affiliations: Maharashtra Board of Technical Education (MSBTE) All India Council for Technical Education (AICTE)
- Principal: Vikrant Joshi
- Location: Mumbai, Maharashtra
- Website: https://ves.ac.in/polytechnic/

Vivekanand Education Society's Polytechnic (VESP) is a Polytechnic College located in Chembur, in India It is affiliated to the Maharashtra Board of Technical Education (MSBTE) and has been approved by AICTE.

== Campus ==
The campus is located in Chembur, a northeastern suburb of Mumbai. It has playground and other activities like Yoga, Music, Vedanta aids in shaping budding engineers. It has at present about 1400 students, 67 faculty members, and 53 administrative and supportive staff.

== Departments ==
- Computer Engineering (Intake - 120 seats)
- Automation and Robotics (Intake - 60 seats)
- Communication Engineering (Intake - 60 seats)
- Civil Engineering (Intake - 60 seats)
- Mechanical Engineering (Intake - 60 seats)
- Electrical Engineering (Intake - 60 seats)

== Accreditation ==
V.E.S. Polytechnic is affiliated to Maharashtra Board of Technical Education (MSBTE) and has been approved by AICTE.

Computer Engineering, Instrumentation Engineering and Communication Engineering Departments are Provisionally Accredited by National Board of Accreditation (NBA)

== See also ==
- List of Vivekanand Education Society’s schools and colleges
