= Prasshant Jha =

Indian film director and screenwriter

- Jha in 2026
- Born: 3 November 1988 (age 38); Delhi, India
- Education: Ram Lal Anand College; University of Delhi
- Occupations: Film director; screenwriter

Prasshant Jha (born 3 November 1988) is an Indian film director and screenwriter who works in Hindi cinema. He began his career as a ghostwriter before receiving screenwriting credits for Hum Do Hamare Do (2021) and Gustaakh Ishq (2025). He made his feature-film directorial debut with Ginny Wedss Sunny 2 (2026), which he also wrote.

== Early life ==
Jha was raised in Delhi and has family roots in Bihar. He earned a BA (Honours) in English from Ram Lal Anand College, University of Delhi, and later studied filmmaking at Digital Academy in Mumbai.

== Career ==
In a July 2026 interview, Jha said that he began working as a ghostwriter at the age of 20 before moving into credited screenwriting. He was credited with the screenplay and dialogue for the 2021 comedy Hum Do Hamare Do, directed by Abhishek Jain. He later co-wrote the romantic drama Gustaakh Ishq with its director, Vibhu Puri. A review by Bollywood Hungama described their screenplay as unhurried and engaging while noting that it had rough edges, and identified the dialogue as one of the film's strengths. In 2026, Jha wrote and directed the romantic comedy Ginny Wedss Sunny 2, starring Avinash Tiwary and Medha Shankr. Reviewing the film for Firstpost, Lachmi Deb Roy praised the chemistry between Tiwary and Shankr, the supporting cast and the film's simplicity, while noting its predictability and dialogue-heavy writing. Rishabh Suri of Hindustan Times found parts of the film easy to watch and occasionally funny, but criticised its repetitive narrative. Following its release on Prime Video, the film received renewed media attention. Firstpost profiled Jha's transition from screenwriting to directing in the context of the film's discovery by streaming audiences, while DNA India described its OTT run as an "underdog success story" for the debut director. India TV and Bhaskar Digital also reported that the film continued to feature among Prime Video's prominent titles over several weeks.

In a July 2026 interview, Jha described his next project as an untitled love story with elements of betrayal, revenge, action and music. He also discussed his progression from ghostwriting to filmmaking in an interview on DD National's DD Morning Show.

== Filmography ==
Film credits
Year	Title	Credit
2021	Hum Do Hamare Do	Screenplay and dialogue
2025	Gustaakh Ishq	Writer
2026	Ginny Wedss Sunny 2	Writer and director
