= Vivekanand Education Society's Institute of Technology =

College in Mumbai, India

VES Institute of Technology
- Other name: VESIT
- Motto: Arise, awake, stop not till the goal is reached
- Type: College
- Established: 1984
- Affiliations: University of Mumbai
- Chairman: Shri. B. L. Boolani
- Principal: J. M. Nair
- Faculty: 180
- Undergraduates: 3,600 (approx)
- Postgraduates: 500 (approx)
- Website: vesit.ves.ac.in

Vivekanand Education Society's Institute of Technology, also known as VESIT or V. E. S. Institute of Technology, is an engineering college located in Chembur, Mumbai, India.

Established in 1984, it is affiliated with the University of Mumbai and was granted academic autonomy by the University Grants Commission in 2023.

== History ==
Vivekanand Education Society’s Institute of Technology (VESIT) was established in 1984 by the Vivekanand Education Society. The institute moved to its current location at the Hashu Advani Memorial Complex in Chembur in 2010.

== Campus ==
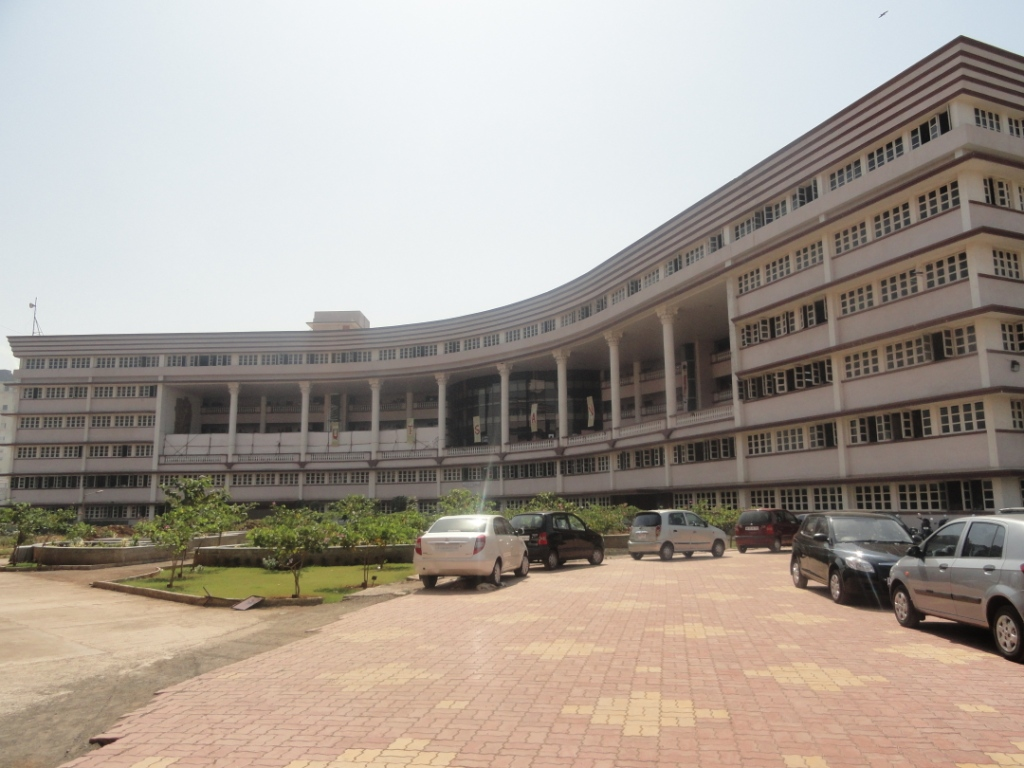
VESIT new building

The campus is located in Hashu Advani Memorial Complex, Chembur-east, Mumbai-400074, a northeastern suburb of Mumbai, and stretches over a few acres of land. VESIT moved to the present campus from its old one (also in Chembur) in December 2010.

The engineering college (VESIT) shares its campus with the college of Pharmacy and the college for Management and Research. The campus comprises one C-shaped building for the engineering college and several other buildings for the other colleges, hostels, etc. VESIT has a multi storey building, wherein each floor is allotted to each of the five departments, and the ground floor comprises the administrative office, principal's office, examination department, canteen, etc. VESIT also has a library on the first floor and an open section on the second floor.

== Academics and administration ==
VESIT is affiliated with the University of Mumbai for the award of degrees. In December 2023, the University Grants Commission conferred autonomous status on the institute for ten years, effective 13 December 2023.

=== Centres and laboratories ===
The institute has several industry-supported laboratories, including the NI LabVIEW Academy with National Instruments, a Big Data Analytics laboratory in collaboration with Cloudera, a VLSI design laboratory with Cadence, and an e-Yantra embedded systems lab supported by IIT Bombay.

== Research and innovation ==
In 2025, an integrated circuit designed by a VESIT student team was fabricated at the Semi-Conductor Laboratory in Mohali and showcased at the Semicon India 2025 conference in Gujarat. The Marathi daily Loksatta reported that the design, a Programmable Gain Amplifier (PGA) IC on a 180-nm CMOS node, was presented as part of the "Made in India" chip showcase.

== Rankings ==
In the National Institutional Ranking Framework (NIRF) 2021, VESIT was placed in the 251–300 band among engineering institutions. In 2024, India Today ranked the institute 153rd among B.Tech colleges in India.

== Student life ==
VESIT organises Praxis, its annual inter-collegiate technical festival, which features workshops, competitions, and lectures.

== See also ==
- List of Vivekanand Education Society’s schools and colleges
