= Alkesh Dinesh Mody Institute =

Indian business school

Coordinates: 19.06966°N 72.85857°E

- Motto in English: Erudition Faith Character
- Type: Public business school
- Established: 1994; 32 years ago
- Affiliations: University of Mumbai, NAAC
- Director: Dr. Smita Shukla
- Faculty: 37
- Students: 221
- Location: Mumbai, Maharashtra, India
- Campus: Joravar Bhavan, University Campus, Santacruz
- Website: admi.mu.ac.in

Alkesh Dinesh Mody Institute (ADMI) (officially known as Alkesh Dinesh Mody Institute for Financial and Management Studies) is a business school located in Mumbai, Maharashtra. It is one of the few institutes which came into existence in the city of Mumbai in the early 1990s during Economic Liberlization of India which resulted in the increased demand for Management Education in the city. It is also one of the two departments of the University of Mumbai offering management education (the other being Jamnalal Bajaj Institute of Management Studies). It is located in the Western Suburbs at Santacruz and is also very close to the business district of Bandra Kurla Complex.

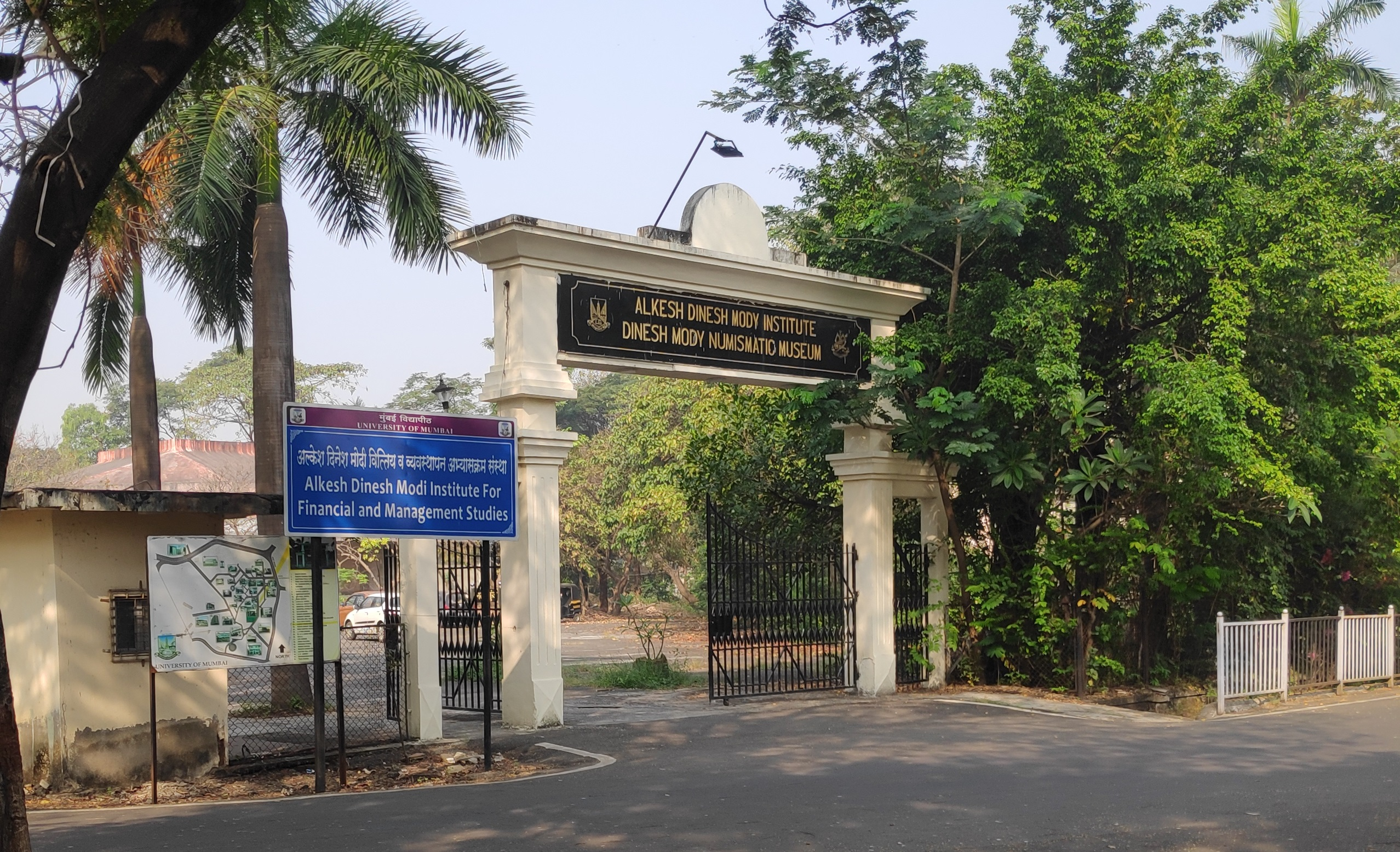
ADMI entrance

== History ==
Alkesh Dinesh Mody Institute was co-founded by Mr. Dineshbhai Mody in loving memory of his son Mr. Alkesh Dinesh Mody who was a dynamic stockbroker. The Institute was established in the year 1994 as a Department of the University of Mumbai for offering management education with a focus of financial services. The Institute was set up in response to the growing need of Indian managers and investors who could handle business and Capital Market operations in rapidly changing business and financial environment.

== Academics ==
The first course that was offered by Institute was 'Diploma in Investment Studies - (D.I.S)'. In the year 1998 Institute converted its two year 'D.I.S.' course into 'Masters in Financial Services and Management' program. In the year 2000 Institute added another course by starting undergraduate degree program BMS (Bachelors in Management Studies). In the year 2002 Institute, post permission of the All India Council for Technical Education, started offering MMS (Masters in Management Studies) course. The institute also offers M.Sc. Finance and doctoral research program - PhD in Management.

=== Admissions ===
The admissions to its flagship MMS program is primarily done on basis of Common Entrance Test (CET) scores conducted by the DTE, Maharashtra. The seats are allotted through centralised admission process (CAP) rounds. The DTE also accepts CAT, XAT, CMAT, MAT scores in preparing the merit list.

== Campus and Infrastructure ==
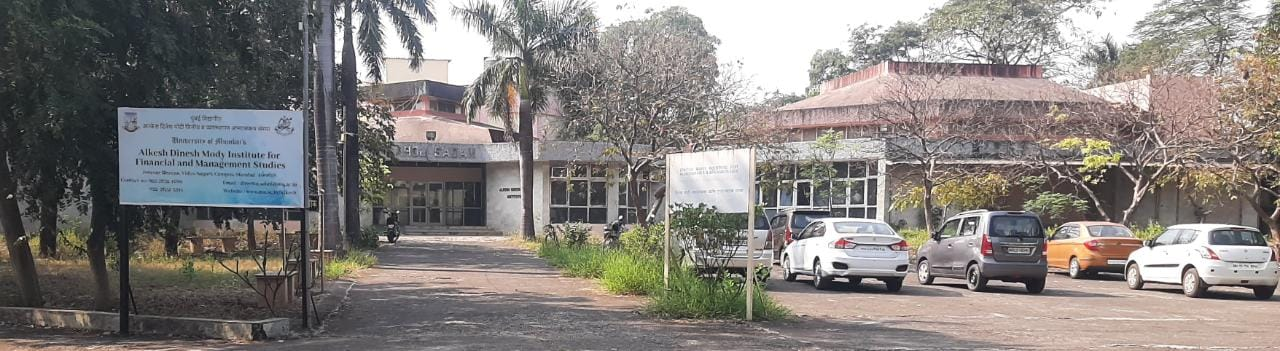
ADMI campus

The institute is located inside University of Mumbai's Vidyanagari Campus at Kalina, Santacruz. It has air conditioned classrooms, conference room and a well-equipped library with over 22000 physical books & 20000 E-Books, 700 educational CDs, a regular subscription of more than 90 journals and periodicals. The Institute being a department of the University enjoys all the perks and facilities available on the University Campus at Kalina. This includes;

- Access to the University Gymkhana
- University's Cricket ground
- All the canteens and messes available on campus
- Accommodation in the Guest houses and hostels
- The Jawaharlal Nehru Library

=== Hostel Facility ===
Hostel facility is available to the students in the Kalina campus.

== Rankings ==
The Institute consistently features in the list of Top B-Schools all over India.

- Business Today B-School rankings 2018 - Rank 202 out of 303.
- The Week B-School rankings 2018 - Rank 93 out of 150.

== Student Life and Participation ==
The institute has various student committees’ for extracurricular activities.

=== Alumni Committee ===
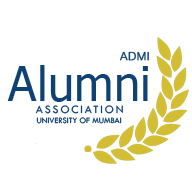
ADMI Alumni Association

The ADMI Alumni committee has recently been established with an aim to form alumni groups region wise, batch wise to drive activities, organize events and networking opportunities in their desired interests areas. Its mission is to connect the Alumni with their alma mater and bridge the industry academia interface and as well mentor budding management Students for their upcoming career pursuits.

=== Placement Committee ===
The Placement Committee is composed of PG students and they work closely with placement officer towards achieving the goal of obtaining the desired placement offers for the students in terms of both profiles and organisations to work with. In addition, placement committee plays an instrumental role in developing and sustaining a mutually beneficial long terms relationship with the industry. It takes initiatives and organises lots of students grooming sessions, doing all the necessary arrangements during the visit of corporate on campus for placements and guest lectures etc. Committee also takes the complete responsibility for managing students database and sending their details to corporate as per their interest and eligibility in democratic way.

=== Media Committee ===
The Media committee is made up of PG students and its primary objective is to ensure the support of the institute in the use of social media. It develops and maintains an editorial calendar for social media that supports sharing relevant information via social media and other platforms.

It also plans, Coordinates and organizes various student, Institute level events that help strengthen the brand value of the institute.

=== Artillery Committee ===
The Artillery committee ensures that the students are exposed to the latest information and news happening in the corporate world as well as current affairs. Students are encouraged to participate in Case study competitions and compete with top notch individuals.

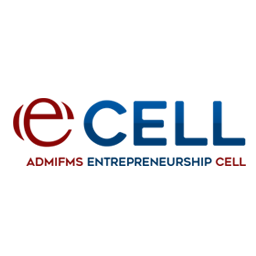
ADMI Entrepreneurship cell

=== Cultural Committee ===
Cultural Committee plans and executes all cultural events happening in the institute and also its Cultural festival – Zest.

=== E-Cell ===
On 22 August 2016, E-Cell was successfully launched at the institute for Entrepreneurship activities. E-Cell is being run in association with Wadwani Foundation's NEN (National Entrepreneurship Network).

=== Anvaya CSR ===
Anvaya-The Social Responsibility Club, ADMIFMS is a group consisting of PG students and is responsible for Corporate Social Responsibility initiatives.

== Notable alumni ==
- Sayali Bhagat, actress.

== See also ==
- University of Mumbai
- Jamnalal Bajaj Institute of Management Studies
