= Geeta Basra =

English actress (born 1984)

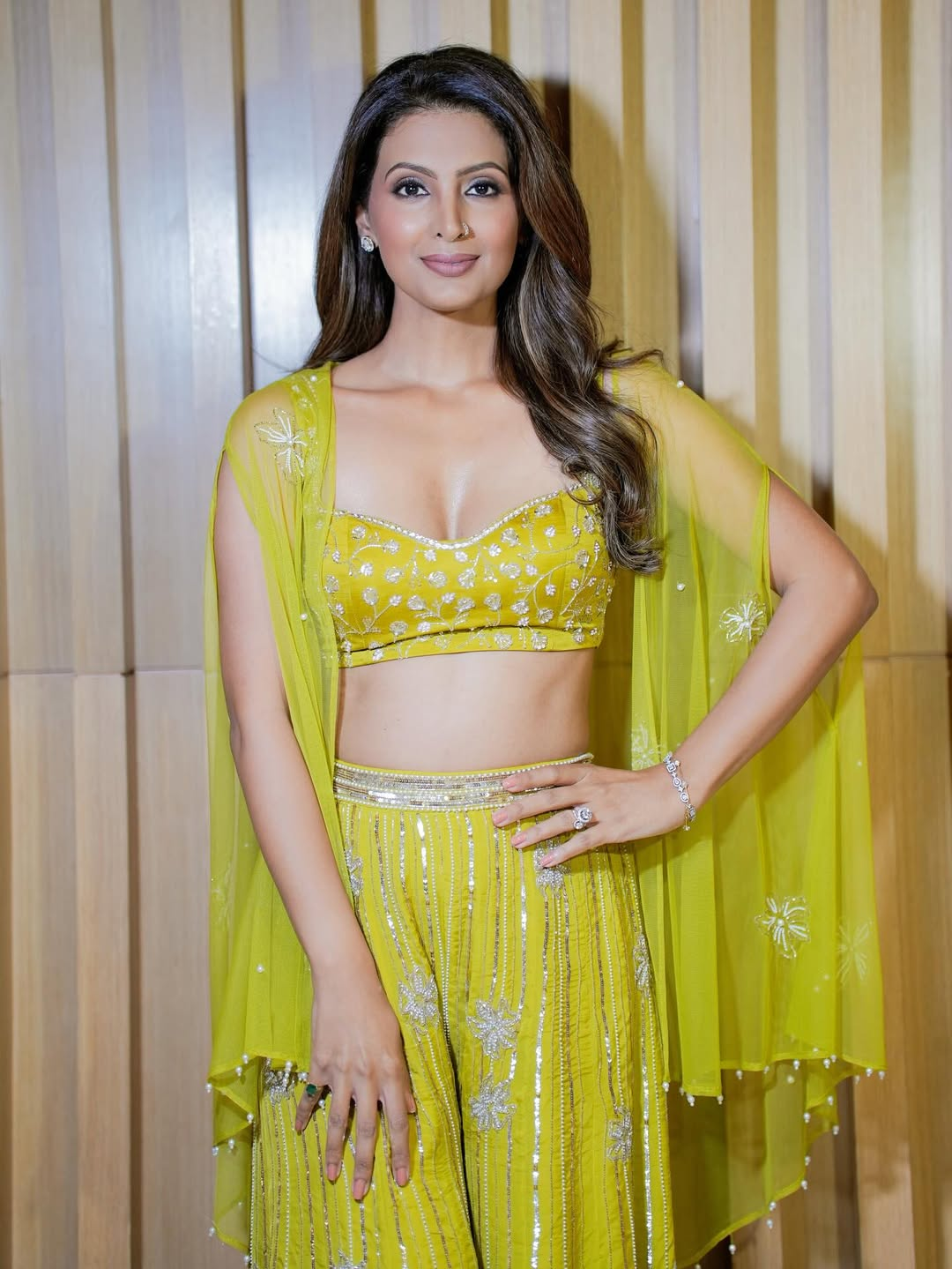
- Basra during promotion of Mehar in 2025
- Born: Geeta Basra; 13 March 1984 (age 42); Portsmouth, Hampshire, England
- Occupation: Actress
- Years active: 2006-2016, 2025
- Spouse: Harbhajan Singh (m. 2015)
- Children: 2
- Parent: 2

Geeta Basra (born 13 March 1984) is a British former actress who has appeared in Bollywood films.

== Early life ==
Basra was born to Indian Punjabi migrants in Portsmouth, Hampshire, on the south coast of England. She has one younger brother, Rahul, and sister Ruby.

She studied acting at the Kishore Namit Kapoor Acting Institute.

== Career ==
She was first seen in the Emraan Hashmi-starrer Dil Diya Hai in 2006 in which she played a girl who is sold into prostitution by her lover. Her second release, The Train (2007), was also opposite Hashmi. She played Roma, a working woman who gets caught up in an extramarital affair.

Basra was also seen in the music video for the Sukshinder Shinda and Rahat Fateh Ali Khan song "Ghum Sum Ghum Sum", playing the love interest of the male protagonist played by Rahul Bhat.

== Personal life ==
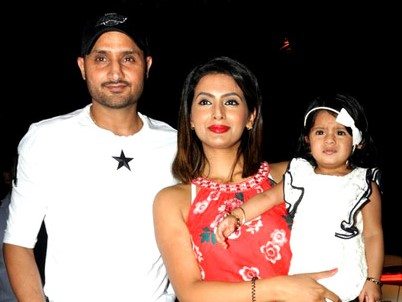
Basra with husband Harbhajan Singh at Rakesh Roshan's birthday bash in 2017

Basra married Indian cricketer Harbhajan Singh on 29 October 2015 in Jalandhar, Punjab. They have a daughter, Hinaya Heer Plaha, born on 27 July 2016 in Portsmouth, Hampshire. and a son, Jovan Veer Singh Plaha, born on 10 July 2021. They reside in Mumbai, India.

== Filmography ==
Year	Title	Role(s)	Director(s)	Language(s)	Notes	Ref.
2006	Dil Diya Hai	Neha Mehra	Aditya Datt	Hindi	Debut film	
2007	The Train	Roma Kapoor / Richa Malhotra	Hasnain Hyderabadwala; Raksha Mistry	Hindi		
2013	Zila Ghaziabad	———	Anand Kumar	Hindi	Special Appearance in song "Baap Ka Maal"	
2014	Mr Joe B. Carvalho	Gehna	Samir Tewari	Hindi		
2015	Second Hand Husband	Neha Kaur Grewal	Smeep Kang	Hindi		
2016	Lock	Pammi	Smeep Kang	Punjabi		
2025	Mehar		Rakesh Mehta	Punjabi		
