= Vivekanand Education Society's Institute of Management Studies and Research =

Private business school in Mumbai, India

VESIM
- Motto: Professionals with Principles
- Type: Private business school
- Established: 1994
- President: Shri. Suresh Malkani
- Director: Dr. Vijay T Raisinghani
- Location: Mumbai, Maharashtra, India; 19.0328°N 72.8964°E
- Campus: Urban
- Website: vesim.ves.ac.in

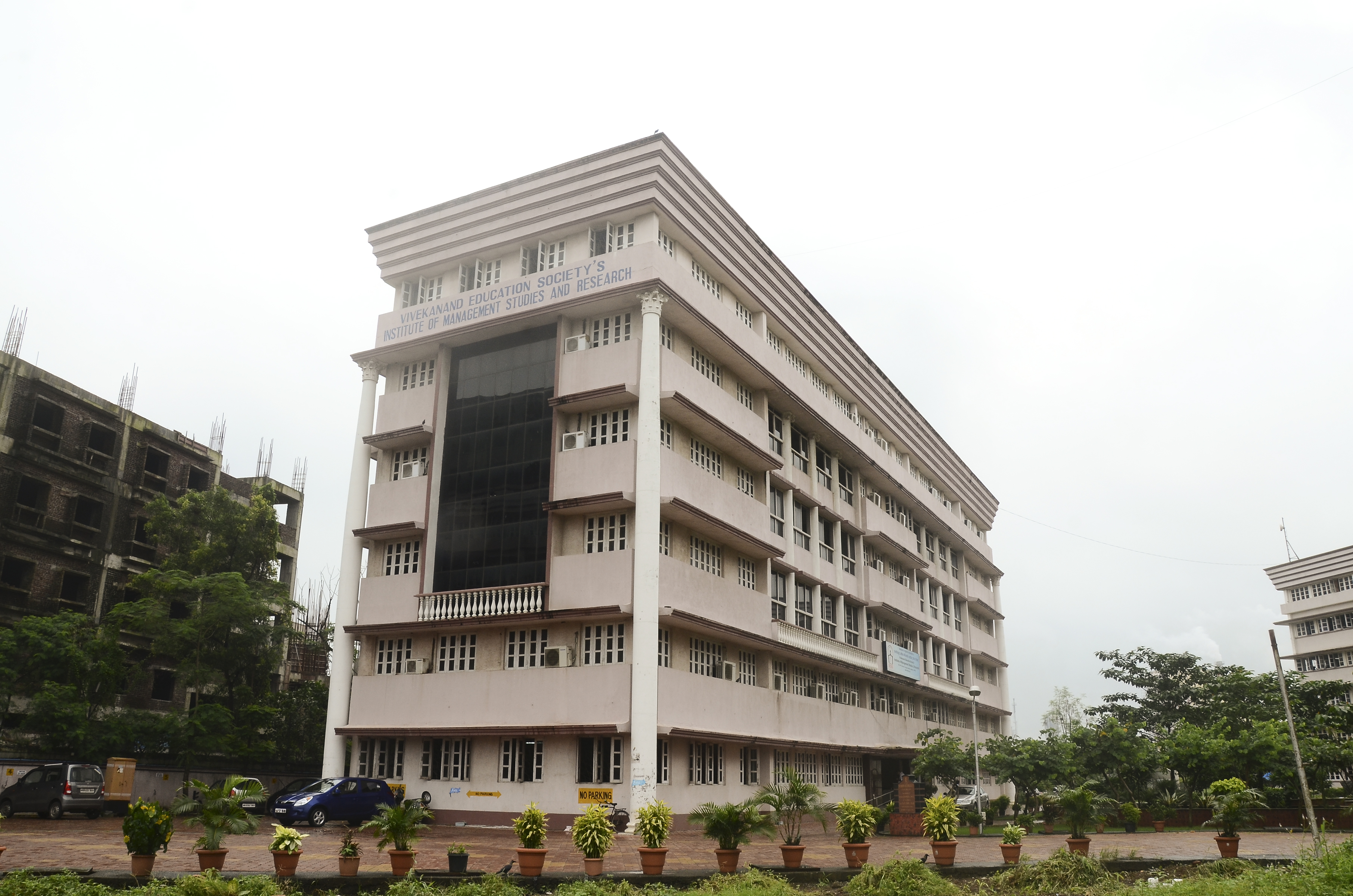
Vivekanand Education Society Institute of Management Studies and Research campus at Chembur

Vivekanand Education Society Institute of Management Studies & Research (VESIM) is a premier business school located in Mumbai, Maharashtra, India.

== Accreditation ==
The post graduation programs of VESIM are All India Council for Technical Education (AICTE) approved, accredited by the National Board of Accreditation (NBA) and accorded equivalence with MBA Degree of an Indian University by Association of Indian Universities (AIU). VESIM has been awarded "A" grade by the Directorate of Technical Education, Maharashtra (DTE) in 2007. VESIM has also received the National Assessment And Accreditation Council (NAAC) accreditation.

== Rankings and awards ==
Bronze winner in the category ‘Pedagogy for Developing Job Competencies in MBAs’ at the "9th Indian Management Conclave Award 2018" held at IIM Bangalore

Ranked among Top 76-100 Rank Band PAN India by NIRF for 2019.

Ranked 67th in the overall ranking of Top B-Schools by MBA Universe for the year 2018-2019.

== Journals ==
- ‘Journal of Development Research’ (ISSN No. 2229-7561) is a biannual publication about management of institutional and structural transformation of societies.

== Notable staff ==
- Satish Modh

== See also ==
- List of Vivekanand Education Society’s schools and colleges
