= Anand Kumar (director) =

Indian film director (born 1970)

- Born: 10 December 1970 (age 55); Delhi, India
- Education: DTEA Sr. Secondary School, Lodhi Estate
- Occupations: director, film producer, screenwriter
- Spouse: Neeta Menon Anand
- Children: Krish (b.2002); Vivaansh (b.2012)
- Parent(s): R. Rajappan & Shanta Raju
- Relatives: Chitra Raju (Sibling)

Anand Kumar (born 10 December 1970) is an Indian film director, writer and producer. He was born and brought up in Delhi. He started his career in film making by directing Delhii Heights in 2007. His other movies are Jugaad (2009) featuring Manoj Bajpai, and Zila Ghaziabad (2013) featuring Sanjay Dutt, Arshad Warsi, Vivek Oberoi and Minisha Lamba.

== Early life ==
Anand Kumar was born in a Malayali family in Delhi. His father is a lawyer in Delhi High Court and mother is a housewife. He received his education from DTEA Sr Secondary School, Lodhi Estate, New Delhi. He was a college dropout from MDU Law College, Rohtak. He spent a few years in Hyderabad, where he pursued a mass communication course and thereafter got the opportunity to work for various ad films, music, videos and documentaries in Mumbai, Delhi and Chandigarh.

== Filmography ==
| Year | Film | Role(s) |
|---|---|---|
| 2007 | Delhii Heights | Director, writer |
| 2009 | Jugaad | Director |
| 2013 | Zila Ghaziabad | Director, writer |
| 2014 | Desi Kattey | Director, producer |
| 2011 | Private Number (Regional) (Unreleased) | Director |
| 2018 | Ek Balti Paani (Short Film) | Producer, director |

== Production company ==
Kumar's company, Anand Kumar Productions, makes films as well as video content for television, social media, corporate promotions and commercials.

In 2014, it released its first action film, Desi Kattey, to mixed reviews. It is planning a biopic of the footballer Bhaichung Bhutia and a thriller, Meerut Junction.
