= Pachaikili Muthucharam =

2007 Indian action thriller film

- Promotional poster
- Directed by: Gautham Vasudev Menon
- Written by: Gautham Vasudev Menon
- Produced by: V. Ravichandran
- Starring: R. Sarathkumar; Jyothika; Andrea Jeremiah; Milind Soman
- Cinematography: Arvind Krishna; Additional cinematography: Nirav Shah
- Edited by: Anthony
- Music by: Harris Jayaraj
- Production company: Aascar Films Pvt. Ltd
- Release date: 16 February 2007
- Running time: 150 minutes
- Country: India
- Language: Tamil

Pachaikili Muthucharam (transl. Green parrot and string of pearls) is a 2007 Indian Tamil-language action thriller film directed by Gautham Vasudev Menon. It is loosely based on James Siegel's 2003 novel Derailed. The film stars R. Sarathkumar, Jyothika, Andrea Jeremiah and Milind Soman. The score and soundtrack were composed by Harris Jayaraj. The film was released on 16 February 2007, and performed average at the box office.

== Plot ==
Venkatesh, a medical representative, lives a peaceful life with his wife Kalyani and their young son, Nanda. Their domestic harmony faces strain when Nanda is diagnosed with juvenile diabetes. As Kalyani becomes fully consumed with managing their son's health, she inadvertently neglects Venkatesh, leaving him feeling isolated in his daily routine.

During his morning train commute to work, Venkatesh strikes up a conversation with a woman named Geetha. Finding common ground in their suburban family lives, the two build a close friendship. Over time, their meetings move from daily train rides to casual outings in cafes and restaurants. Geetha eventually suggests spending a day together, coaxing Venkatesh to go to a resort on East Coast Road, where he books a room at her insistence.

While inside the room, a criminal named Lawrence barges in, brutally assaults Venkatesh, robs the couple, and rapes Geetha before fleeing. Traumatised and overcome with guilt, Venkatesh and Geetha part ways. Soon after, Lawrence begins blackmailing Venkatesh for money. Fearing exposure, Venkatesh assumes full responsibility and exhausts his savings, which were set aside for Nanda's treatment, to pay the extortion demands. Running out of funds, Venkatesh eventually confesses the ordeal to Kalyani. Though deeply hurt, Kalyani temporarily leaves before returning to support him, and the couple reconciles.

Walking through the city, Venkatesh unexpectedly spots Geetha and Lawrence together, discovering that the entire setup was a coordinated extortion scam. He tracks them to a hotel where they are targeting their next victim, Ramachandran. Venkatesh intervenes to warn Ramachandran, triggering a violent brawl in which Ramachandran is killed, Geetha is accidentally shot in the abdomen, and Venkatesh kills Lawrence in self-defence. Exhausted, Venkatesh flees the scene and relocates his family to Hyderabad to rebuild their lives.

Sometime later, Geetha's henchmen track down the family and kidnap Kalyani. Venkatesh learns that Geetha survived her gunshot wound and seeks vengeance for Lawrence's death. Confronting the syndicate at their hideout, Venkatesh overpowers the gang, kills Geetha in the ensuing melee, and rescues Kalyani. Leaving the extorted money behind with the remaining henchmen, Venkatesh safely departs with Kalyani and Nanda.

== Cast ==
- R. Sarathkumar as Venkatesh
- Jyothika as Smitha (Geetha)
- Andrea Jeremiah as Kalyani (Voice dubbed by Rohini)
- Milind Soman as Lawrence (Voice dubbed by Gautham Vasudev Menon)
- VTV Ganesh as Velu
- Armaan as Nanda
- Venkat as Muruga
- Hariraj as Ramachandran
- Mishalle as Debbai
- Cool Suresh as Dass
- Kannan as Kannan
- Manikandan as Elangovan
- Gautham Vasudev Menon as a bus passenger (uncredited)
- Veera as a bus passenger (uncredited)
- Karthik as a singer (uncredited)

== Production ==
After reading the novel Derailed by James Siegel, Gautham Vasudev Menon decided to make a film loosely inspired by it rather than adapting the novel verbatim. The film was previously titled Vilai Uyirendraalum (Even If the Price Is Life Itself) and Silandhi (Spider), but later titled Pachaikili Muthucharam, after a song from Ulagam Sutrum Valiban (1973). Menon described the title (loosely translated as "a parrot with a string of pearls") as a metaphor to the film's content, saying, "What will happen to a string of pearls if a parrot gets it? The pearls might scatter away."

For the second lead female role several actresses were considered with Tabu, Kamalinee Mukherjee and Shobana as the frontrunners. Shobana was chosen to play the role whom Menon described as the "finest actor in the country". However, she was replaced by Andrea Jeremiah, who previously collaborated with Menon in Vettaiyaadu Vilaiyaadu (2006) as a playback singer. The lead role was initially offered to Kamal Haasan, who declined. Cheran showed interest, but declined due to scheduling conflicts. R. Madhavan also declined as he was uninterested in playing the father of a child. After Menon casually met R. Sarathkumar, the actor agreed to do the film. The director also changed the actor's general looks for the film.

== Soundtrack ==
The film has five songs composed by Harris Jayaraj. The song "Karu Karu Vizhigalal" was noted for its musical structure being similar to Westlife's "Hit You With The Real Thing".

Tamil track listing
No.	Title	Lyrics	Singer(s)	Length
1.	"Unakkul Naane" (Version 1)	Rohini	Bombay Jayashri	4:43
2.	"Unakkul Naane" (Version 2)	Rohini	Madhushree	4:41
3.	"Un Sirippinil"	Thamarai	Sowmya Rao, Mohamed Raffee	5:35
4.	"Kaadhal Konjam"	Thamarai	Naresh Iyer	4:52
5.	"Karu Karu"	Thamarai	Karthik, Naresh Iyer, Krish	3:36
Total length:				23:27

All tracks are written by Vennelakanti.

Telugu track listing
No.	Title	Singer(s)	Length
1.	"Undaleni"	Anuradha Sriram, Raghu Kunche	4:38
2.	"Nee Talapuna"	Naga Saihithi	5:31
3.	"Challa Naina"	Raghu Kunche	4:45
4.	"Undaleni" (Version 2)	Chinmayi, Raghu Kunche	4:38
5.	"Daagudumoothal"	Karthik, Raghu Kunche	3:12
Total length:			23:06

== Release ==
The censor board cleared the film with an "A" (adults only) certificate for its theme with no visual cuts but a few dialogue muted. The film was initially scheduled to release on 9 February 2007, but was pushed to 16 February because Ravichandran wanted more time to publicise the film. The film's Karnataka distributor also asked him to delay the release as theatres in Bengaluru were temporarily blocked from screening Tamil films due to the Kaveri River water dispute.

=== Critical reception ===
Sriram Iyer from Rediff.com wrote that "One must hand it to Gautham Menon for keeping the film from degenerating into a melodrama by giving the right mix of action and drama". Lajjavathi of Kalki wrote it cannot be said that everyone will appreciate the softness that permeates the entire film. She added that although there are various reviews about the story of this film, a new attempt is welcome. Sify gave the film a positive review, appreciating its faithfulness to Derailed and wrote, "What makes the film so interestingly relevant is the fact that such a tragedy could strike anyone in the pulsating day to day city life".

=== Box office ===
The film performed average at the box office. In regard to the average run, Menon felt that Sarathkumar was "wrong for the film" and that he tweaked the story to fit his image; he also claimed that his father's ailing health and consequent death a week before the release had left him mentally affected.

== Accolades ==
Award	Category	Recipient(s)	Result	Ref.
Vijay Awards	Best Debut Actress	Andrea Jeremiah	Nominated	
