= James Siegel =

American novelist

- Born: 1954 (age 71–72); United States
- Education: York College, City University of New York (BA)
- Occupation: Novelist
- Writing career
- Language: English
- Genre: Thriller

James Siegel (born 1954) is an American thriller novelist. He holds a B.A. from the York College 1977, City University of New York, and lives in Manhattan and Sag Harbor, NY.

Siegel worked for many years as an advertising executive in New York City, with writing credits from the "Yo, Yao" ad that aired during Super Bowl XXXVII, and was Vice Chairman of the Board of Directors of BBDO New York. Since leaving commercial advertising in 2006, he has been responsible for many political advertisements from Eliot Spitzer's gubernatorial campaign in New York in 2006 to Hillary Clinton's Presidential campaign in 2008. He continues to work in politics today.

The movie Derailed, a film based on his 2003 novel of the same name, was released on October 21, 2005. The novel was also adapted as the Tamil film Pachaikili Muthucharam. He has written five other novels.

In 2009, Siegel teamed up with stem cell advocate Brooke Ellison and directed the award-winning documentary "Hope Deferred".

== Bibliography ==
- Epitaph (2001)
- Derailed (2003)
- Detour (2005)
- Deceit (2006)
- Storyteller (2011)
- .'Safe' (2020)
- 'The Blow-Up' (2024)
