= List of accolades received by The Dirty Picture =

The Dirty Picture is a 2011 Indian biographical drama film directed by Milan Luthria and produced by Shobha and Ekta Kapoor. Inspired by the lives of such actresses as Silk Smitha and Disco Shanti, the film narrates the rise and fall of a dancing girl in Tamil cinema. The Dirty Picture features Vidya Balan in the lead role, and co-stars Emraan Hashmi, Tusshar Kapoor and Naseeruddin Shah. Rajat Arora wrote the screenplay, dialogues and lyrics for the film and Vishal–Shekhar composed the music.

Made on a budget between ₹170 million (US$1.9 million) and ₹180 million (US$2.1 million), The Dirty Picture was released worldwide on 2 December 2011, and earned ₹1.14 billion (US$13 million). The film garnered awards and nominations in several categories, with particular praise for Vidya's performance, the dialogues, and the costume design by Niharika Khan. As of 2012, the film has won 51 awards.

The Dirty Picture won three National Film Awards, including Best Actress (Vidya) and Best Costume Design (Khan). At the 57th Filmfare Awards ceremony, the film won three awards, including Best Actress and Best Costume Design. It also received nominations for Best Film and Best Director (Luthria) at the ceremony. The film also won six Screen Awards, more than any film that year, including Best Film, Best Director and Best Actress. Among other wins, the film received two Apsara Awards, and five awards each from the Zee Cine and International Indian Film Academy Awards ceremonies, all of which included Best Actress awards for Vidya.

== Accolades ==
Award	Date of ceremony (Note: Date is linked to the article about the awards held that year, wherever possible.)	Category	Recipient(s) and nominee(s)	Result	Ref(s)
Apsara Film & Television Producers Guild Awards (Note: Also known as Star Guild Awards.)	25 January 2012	Best Film	The Dirty Picture	Nominated	
Apsara Film & Television Producers Guild Awards	25 January 2012	Best Director	Milan Luthria	Nominated	
Apsara Film & Television Producers Guild Awards	25 January 2012	Best Actress in a Leading Role	Vidya Balan	Won	
Apsara Film & Television Producers Guild Awards	25 January 2012	Best Actor in a Supporting Role	Emraan Hashmi	Nominated	
Apsara Film & Television Producers Guild Awards	25 January 2012	Best Actor in a Supporting Role	Naseeruddin Shah	Nominated	
Apsara Film & Television Producers Guild Awards	25 January 2012	Best Performance in a Negative Role	Naseeruddin Shah	Nominated	
Apsara Film & Television Producers Guild Awards	25 January 2012	Best Dialogue	Rajat Arora	Won	
Apsara Film & Television Producers Guild Awards	25 January 2012	Best Art Director	Priya Suhas	Nominated	
Apsara Film & Television Producers Guild Awards	25 January 2012	Best Costume Design	Niharika Khan	Nominated	
Asian Film Awards	19 March 2012	Best Actress	Vidya Balan	Nominated	
Asia Pacific Screen Awards	23 November 2012	Best Actress	Vidya Balan	Nominated	
BIG Star Entertainment Awards	18 December 2011	Most Entertaining Film Actor – Female	Vidya Balan	Won	
BIG Star Entertainment Awards	18 December 2011	Most Entertaining Film	Ekta Kapoor	Won	
BIG Star Entertainment Awards	18 December 2011	Most Entertaining Director	Milan Luthria	Nominated	
BIG Star Entertainment Awards	18 December 2011	Most Entertaining Music	Vishal–Shekhar	Nominated	
BIG Star Entertainment Awards	18 December 2011	Most Entertaining Singer – Female	Shreya Ghoshal (for "Ooh La La")	Nominated	
ETC Bollywood Business Awards	6 January 2012	Box Office Surprise of the Year	The Dirty Picture	Won	
Filmfare Awards	29 January 2012	Best Film	The Dirty Picture	Nominated	
Filmfare Awards	29 January 2012	Best Director	Milan Luthria	Nominated	
Filmfare Awards	29 January 2012	Best Actress	Vidya Balan	Won	
Filmfare Awards	29 January 2012	Best Supporting Actor	Naseeruddin Shah	Nominated	
Filmfare Awards	29 January 2012	Best Costume Design	Niharika Khan	Won	
Filmfare Awards	29 January 2012	Best Scene of the Year	The Dirty Picture	Won	
FICCI Frames Excellence Honours	16 March 2012	Best Actress in a Leading Role	Vidya Balan	Won	
Global Indian Music Academy Awards	1 October 2012	Best Playback Singer – Female	Shreya Ghoshal (for "Ooh La La")	Nominated	
Global Indian Music Academy Awards	1 October 2012	Best Film Song	"Ishq Sufiyana"	Nominated	
Global Indian Music Academy Awards	1 October 2012	Best Film Album	The Dirty Picture	Nominated	
Global Indian Music Academy Awards	1 October 2012	Best Music Debut	Kamal Khan	Won	
Global Indian Music Academy Awards	1 October 2012	Most Popular Song on Radio 93.5 FM	Bappi Lahiri (for "Ooh La La")	Won	
International Indian Film Academy Awards	9 June 2012	Best Film	The Dirty Picture	Nominated	
International Indian Film Academy Awards	9 June 2012	Best Director	Milan Luthria	Nominated	
International Indian Film Academy Awards	9 June 2012	Best Actress	Vidya Balan	Won	
International Indian Film Academy Awards	9 June 2012	Best Supporting Actor	Emraan Hashmi	Nominated	
International Indian Film Academy Awards	9 June 2012	Best Supporting Actor	Naseeruddin Shah	Nominated	
International Indian Film Academy Awards	9 June 2012	Best Negative Actor	Naseeruddin Shah	Nominated	
International Indian Film Academy Awards	9 June 2012	Best Story	Rajat Arora	Nominated	
International Indian Film Academy Awards	9 June 2012	Best Lyricist	Rajat Arora (for "Ishq Sufiyana")	Nominated	
International Indian Film Academy Awards	9 June 2012	Best Playback Singer (Male)	Kamal Khan (for "Ishq Sufiyana")	Nominated	
International Indian Film Academy Awards	9 June 2012	Best Playback Singer (Female)	Shreya Ghoshal (for "Ooh La La")	Won	
International Indian Film Academy Awards	9 June 2012	Best Makeup	Vikram Gaikwad	Won	
International Indian Film Academy Awards	9 June 2012	Best Dialogues	Rajat Arora	Won	
International Indian Film Academy Awards	9 June 2012	Best Costumes Design	Niharika Khan	Won	
Lions Gold Awards	11 January 2012	Favourite Popular Director	Milan Luthria	Won	
Lions Gold Awards	11 January 2012	Favourite Choreographer	Pony Verma (for "Ooh La La")	Won	
Lions Gold Awards	11 January 2012	Favourite Playback Singer (Male)	Bappi Lahiri (for "Ooh La La")	Won	
Mirchi Music Awards	21 March 2012	Song of The Year	"Ooh La La"	Nominated	
Mirchi Music Awards	21 March 2012	Album of The Year	Vishal–Shekhar, Rajat Arora	Nominated	
Mirchi Music Awards	21 March 2012	Male Vocalist of The Year	Kamal Khan (for "Ishq Sufiyana – Male")	Won	
Mirchi Music Awards	21 March 2012	Female Vocalist of The Year	Shreya Ghoshal (for "Ooh La La")	Nominated	
Mirchi Music Awards	21 March 2012	Female Vocalist of The Year	Sunidhi Chauhan (for "Ishq Sufiyana – Female")	Won	
Mirchi Music Awards	21 March 2012	Music Composer of The Year	Vishal–Shekhar (for "Ooh La La")	Nominated	
Mirchi Music Awards	21 March 2012	Lyricist of The Year	Rajat Arora (for "Ishq Sufiyana – Male")	Nominated	
Mirchi Music Awards	21 March 2012	Best Upcoming Singer of the Year	Kamal Khan (for "Ishq Sufiyana – Male")	Won	
Mirchi Music Awards	21 March 2012	Song representing Sufi tradition	"Ishq Sufiyana (Female)"	Nominated	
Mirchi Music Awards	21 March 2012	Song representing Sufi tradition	"Ishq Sufiyana (Male)"	Nominated	
Mirchi Music Awards	21 March 2012	Best Item Song of the Year	"Ooh La La"	Won	
National Media Network Film And TV Awards	21 January 2012	Best Picture	The Dirty Picture	Won	
National Media Network Film And TV Awards	21 January 2012	Best Actress	Vidya Balan	Won	
National Film Awards	3 May 2012	Best Actress	Vidya Balan	Won	
National Film Awards	3 May 2012	Best Make-up Artist	Vikram Gaikwad (Note: Gaikwad was jointly awarded for his work in both The Dirty Picture and Balgandharva.)	Won	
National Film Awards	3 May 2012	Best Costume Design	Niharika Khan (Note: Shared with Neeta Lulla for Balgandharva.)	Won	
People's Choice Awards India	27 October 2012	Favourite Ensemble Cast	The Dirty Picture	Nominated	
People's Choice Awards India	27 October 2012	Favourite Song of the Year	"Ooh La La"	Nominated	
People's Choice Awards India	27 October 2012	Favourite Male Singer	Kamal Khan (for "Ishq Sufiyana")	Won	
People's Choice Awards India	27 October 2012	Favourite Lyricist	Rajat Arora (for "Ishq Sufiyana")	Won	
Screen Awards	15 January 2012	Best Film	The Dirty Picture (Note: Shared with Zindagi Na Milegi Dobara.)	Won	
Screen Awards	15 January 2012	Best Director	Milan Luthria	Won	
Screen Awards	15 January 2012	Best Actress	Vidya Balan	Won	
Screen Awards	15 January 2012	Best Male Playback Singer	Bappi Lahiri (for "Ooh La La")	Nominated	
Screen Awards	15 January 2012	Best Male Playback Singer	Kamal Khan (for "Ishq Sufiyana")	Nominated	
Screen Awards	15 January 2012	Best Female Playback Singer	Shreya Ghoshal (for "Ooh La La")	Won	
Screen Awards	15 January 2012	Best Dialogue	Rajat Arora (Note: Shared with Farhan Akhtar and Javed Akhtar for Zindagi Na Milegi Dobara.)	Won	
Screen Awards	15 January 2012	Best Production Design	Priya Suhas	Nominated	
Screen Awards	15 January 2012	Best Choreography	Pony Verma (for "Ooh La La")	Nominated	
Screen Awards	15 January 2012	Best Costumes Design	Niharika Khan	Won	
Stardust Awards	25 February 2012	Film of the Year	The Dirty Picture	Won	
Stardust Awards	25 February 2012	Dream Director	Milan Luthria	Nominated	
Stardust Awards	25 February 2012	Star of the Year – Female	Vidya Balan	Won	
Stardust Awards	25 February 2012	Best Actress in a Drama	Vidya Balan	Won	
Stardust Awards	25 February 2012	New Musical Sensation – Male	Kamal Khan (for "Ishq Sufiyana")	Nominated	
Zee Cine Awards	22 January 2012	Best Film	The Dirty Picture	Nominated	
Zee Cine Awards	22 January 2012	Best Film (Jury)	The Dirty Picture	Won	
Zee Cine Awards	22 January 2012	Best Director	Milan Luthria	Nominated	
Zee Cine Awards	22 January 2012	Best Actor – Female	Vidya Balan	Won	
Zee Cine Awards	22 January 2012	Best Actor (Jury) – Female	Vidya Balan	Won	
Zee Cine Awards	22 January 2012	Best Track of the Year	"Ooh La La"	Nominated	
Zee Cine Awards	22 January 2012	Best Song	"Ishq Sufiyana"	Won	
Zee Cine Awards	22 January 2012	Best Choreography	Pony Verma (for "Ooh La La")	Won	

== See also ==
- List of Bollywood films of 2011
