= The Dirty Picture (soundtrack) =

Soundtrack album by Vishal–Shekhar
- Released: 24 November 2011
- Genre: Feature film soundtrack
- Length: 26:15
- Language: Hindi
- Label: T-Series
- Producer: Vishal–Shekhar

Vishal–Shekhar chronology
Ra.One (2011)	The Dirty Picture (2011)	Kahaani (2012)

The Dirty Picture is the soundtrack to the biographical musical drama film of the same name directed by Milan Luthria and produced by Shobha Kapoor and Ekta Kapoor of Balaji Motion Pictures and ALT Entertainment. Starring Vidya Balan, Emraan Hashmi, Naseeruddin Shah and Tusshar Kapoor, the film's soundtrack featured six songs composed by Vishal–Shekhar and lyrics written by Rajat Arora. The soundtrack was released on 24 November 2011 and was commercially successful, with the song "Ooh La La" becoming chartbuster.

== Background and release ==
The duo Vishal–Shekhar composed the film's soundtrack, having previously worked with Luthria on Taxi No. 9211 (2006) with Rajat Arora, besides serving as the screenwriter, also penned down lyrics for the songs. As the film is set during the late-1970s and 1980s, Vishal and Shekhar wanted to emulate the music from that era after previously doing the same for Om Shanti Om (2007). The music for the film consisted of potential dance numbers that would integrally connect with the storyline.

For the song "Ooh La La", Vishal and Milan insisted on veteran composer Bappi Lahiri to perform the vocals alongside Shreya Ghoshal; Lahiri previously associated the director and composer by singing "Mumbai Nagariya" from Taxi No 9211. On the lyrics of the song, he described it as bold but not being vulgar, further adding "Today, there are so many songs with vulgar lyrics. Also, the situation needs to be taken into consideration. The lyrics were required to be bold."

After signing the deal with Balaji Motion Pictures, T-Series acquired the music rights for the film along with Kyaa Super Kool Hain Hum (2012) and Once Upon ay Time in Mumbai Dobaara! (2013). The soundtrack was released on 4 November 2011 at the Inorbit Mall in Malad, Mumbai with the cast and crew in attendance. Vidya further performed the song "Ooh La La" live at the event.

== Reception ==
Joginder Tuteja of Bollywood Hungama gave the music an overall rating of 4 out of 5 describing that the music "takes the expected route and delivers what it promised" and chose "Ooh La La" and "Ishq Sufiyana" as picks from the album. Sukanya Verma of Rediff.com gave the album a rating of 2.5 out of 5 and said the opening track of The Dirty Picture is the album's only star. Vipin Nair of Music Aloud gave 7 out of 10 and wrote "A soundtrack from Vishal-Shekhar that for most part stays true to the title The Dirty Picture. Better lyrics would have added to the allure though." Karthik Srinivasan of Milliblog described it as a "functional soundtrack".

== Track listing ==
No.	Title	Singer(s)	Length
1.	"Ooh La La"	Shreya Ghoshal, Bappi Lahiri	4:18
2.	"Ishq Sufiana" (Male)	Kamal Khan	5:27
3.	"Ishq Sufiana" (Female)	Sunidhi Chauhan	5:29
4.	"Honeymoon Ki Raat"	Sunidhi Chauhan	4:43
5.	"Twinkle Twinkle"	Shreya Ghoshal, Rana Mazumdar	3:05
6.	"Ooh La La" (Dhol Mix)	Shreya Ghoshal, Bappi Lahiri	4:09
Total length:			26:15

== Accolades ==
Award	Date of ceremony (Note: Date is linked to the article about the awards held that year, wherever possible.)	Category	Recipient(s) and nominee(s)	Result	Ref(s)
BIG Star Entertainment Awards	18 December 2011	Most Entertaining Music	Vishal–Shekhar	Nominated	
BIG Star Entertainment Awards	18 December 2011	Most Entertaining Singer – Female	Shreya Ghoshal (for "Ooh La La")	Nominated	
Global Indian Music Academy Awards	1 October 2012	Best Playback Singer – Female	Shreya Ghoshal (for "Ooh La La")	Nominated	
Global Indian Music Academy Awards	1 October 2012	Best Film Song	"Ishq Sufiyana"	Nominated	
Global Indian Music Academy Awards	1 October 2012	Best Film Album	The Dirty Picture	Nominated	
Global Indian Music Academy Awards	1 October 2012	Best Music Debut	Kamal Khan	Won	
Global Indian Music Academy Awards	1 October 2012	Most Popular Song on Radio 93.5 FM	Bappi Lahiri (for "Ooh La La")	Won	
International Indian Film Academy Awards	9 June 2012	Best Lyricist	Rajat Arora (for "Ishq Sufiyana")	Nominated	
International Indian Film Academy Awards	9 June 2012	Best Playback Singer (Male)	Kamal Khan (for "Ishq Sufiyana")	Nominated	
International Indian Film Academy Awards	9 June 2012	Best Playback Singer (Female)	Shreya Ghoshal (for "Ooh La La")	Won	
Lions Gold Awards	11 January 2012	Favourite Choreographer	Pony Verma (for "Ooh La La")	Won	
Lions Gold Awards	11 January 2012	Favourite Playback Singer (Male)	Bappi Lahiri (for "Ooh La La")	Won	
Mirchi Music Awards	21 March 2012	Song of The Year	"Ooh La La"	Nominated	
Mirchi Music Awards	21 March 2012	Album of The Year	Vishal–Shekhar, Rajat Arora	Nominated	
Mirchi Music Awards	21 March 2012	Male Vocalist of The Year	Kamal Khan (for "Ishq Sufiyana – Male")	Won	
Mirchi Music Awards	21 March 2012	Female Vocalist of The Year	Shreya Ghoshal (for "Ooh La La")	Nominated	
Mirchi Music Awards	21 March 2012	Female Vocalist of The Year	Sunidhi Chauhan (for "Ishq Sufiyana – Female")	Won	
Mirchi Music Awards	21 March 2012	Music Composer of The Year	Vishal–Shekhar (for "Ooh La La")	Nominated	
Mirchi Music Awards	21 March 2012	Lyricist of The Year	Rajat Arora (for "Ishq Sufiyana – Male")	Nominated	
Mirchi Music Awards	21 March 2012	Best Upcoming Singer of the Year	Kamal Khan (for "Ishq Sufiyana – Male")	Won	
Mirchi Music Awards	21 March 2012	Song representing Sufi tradition	"Ishq Sufiyana (Female)"	Nominated	
Mirchi Music Awards	21 March 2012	Song representing Sufi tradition	"Ishq Sufiyana (Male)"	Nominated	
Mirchi Music Awards	21 March 2012	Best Item Song of the Year	"Ooh La La"	Won	
People's Choice Awards India	27 October 2012	Favourite Song of the Year	"Ooh La La"	Nominated	
People's Choice Awards India	27 October 2012	Favourite Male Singer	Kamal Khan (for "Ishq Sufiyana")	Won	
People's Choice Awards India	27 October 2012	Favourite Lyricist	Rajat Arora (for "Ishq Sufiyana")	Won	
Screen Awards	15 January 2012	Best Male Playback Singer	Bappi Lahiri (for "Ooh La La")	Nominated	
Screen Awards	15 January 2012	Best Male Playback Singer	Kamal Khan (for "Ishq Sufiyana")	Nominated	
Screen Awards	15 January 2012	Best Female Playback Singer	Shreya Ghoshal (for "Ooh La La")	Won	
Stardust Awards	25 February 2012	New Musical Sensation – Male	Kamal Khan (for "Ishq Sufiyana")	Nominated	
Zee Cine Awards	22 January 2012	Best Track of the Year	"Ooh La La"	Nominated	
Zee Cine Awards	22 January 2012	Best Song	"Ishq Sufiyana"	Won	
Zee Cine Awards	22 January 2012	Best Choreography	Pony Verma (for "Ooh La La")	Won	

== Controversy ==
In May 2012, Saregama India Ltd. filed a lawsuit against Balaji Motion Pictures and T-Series regarding copyright infringement as the song "Ooh La La" was ripped off from "Ui Amma, Ui Amma", a song performed by Kishore Kumar and Asha Bhosle from the film Mawaali (1983), where Jeetendra (who is now the chairman of Balaji Motion Pictures) was the lead actors in the film. Since the label acquired the music rights, it asked the producers to secure appropriate license for the use of the track, but Balaji Motion Pictures denied any similarities to both of the tracks; with no appeal, Saregama then moved to Calcutta High Court claiming ₹2 crore as a compensation. Bappi Lahiri who composed music for Mawaali claimed that the songs were not similar in any manner and were independent and distinct from each other, while Shankar Mahadevan also a similar certificate regarding the same. The court did not restrain Balaji Motion Pictures, but instead reduced the compensation amount to ₹50 lakh.
