= 13th IIFA Awards =

Indian film award ceremony in 2012

- The official logo of the 13th IIFA Awards
- Date: 7 June 2012– 9 June 2012
- Site: Singapore Indoor Stadium; Esplanade Concert Hall, Singapore
- Hosted by: Shahid Kapoor; Farhan Akhtar

Highlights
- Best Picture: Zindagi Na Milegi Dobara
- Best Direction: Zoya Akhtar (Zindagi Na Milegi Dobara)
- Best Actor: Ranbir Kapoor (Rockstar)
- Best Actress: Vidya Balan (The Dirty Picture)
- Most awards: Zindagi Na Milegi Dobara (9)
- Most nominations: Zindagi Na Milegi Dobara (14)

Television coverage
- Channel: Star Plus
- Network: STAR TV

The 2012 IIFA Awards, officially the 13th International Indian Film Academy Awards ceremony, presented by the International Indian Film Academy honouring the films of 2011 took place between 7–9 June 2012. The official ceremony took place on 9 June 2012, at the Singapore Indoor Stadium in Singapore for the second time after 2004. The ceremony was televised in India and internationally on Star Plus. Actors Shahid Kapoor and Farhan Akhtar co-hosted the ceremony the first time. The IIFA Red Carpet was hosted by Karan Tacker

In related events, IIFA Rocks, also known as the IIFA Music and Fashion Extravaganza took place on 8 June 2012 at the Esplanade Concert Hall. The event was hosted by Ayushmann Khurrana and Chitrangada Singh. During the event, all technical awards were presented to the winners. It was telecast on 1 & 7 July on popular Hindi Entertainment channel Star Plus.

The Dirty Picture led the ceremony with 10 nominations, followed by Zindagi Na Milegi Dobara with 9 nominations, Rockstar with 8 nominations, Bodyguard with 7 nominations, and 7 Khoon Maaf with 5 nominations.

Zindagi Na Milegi Dobara won 9 awards, including Best Film, Best Director (for Zoya Akhtar) and Best Supporting Actor (for Farhan Akhtar), thus becoming the most-awarded film at the ceremony.

== Winners and nominees ==
Following the IIFA Voting Weekend, which occurred from 31 March – 1 April 2012, the nominees, along with the winners of the technical awards were announced on 4 May 2012 on the IIFA website by Sabbas Joseph, director of Wizcraft International Entertainment.

The winners will be announced during the main awards ceremony on 9 June 2012. The technical awards will be given to their respective winners during the IIFA Rocks on 8 June 2012.

=== Popular awards ===
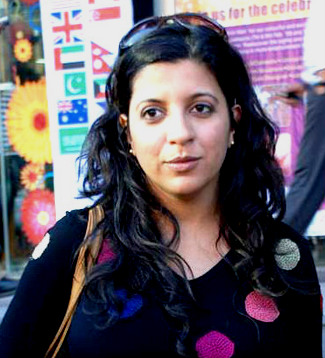
Zoya Akhtar (Best Director)

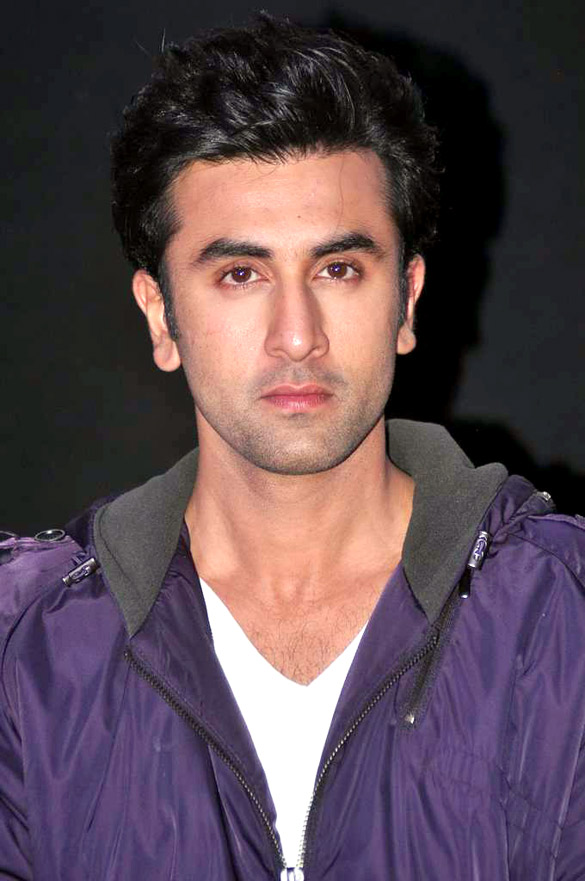
Ranbir Kapoor (Best Actor)

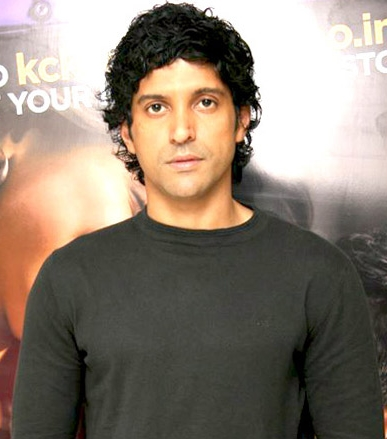
Farhan Akhtar (Best Supporting Actor)

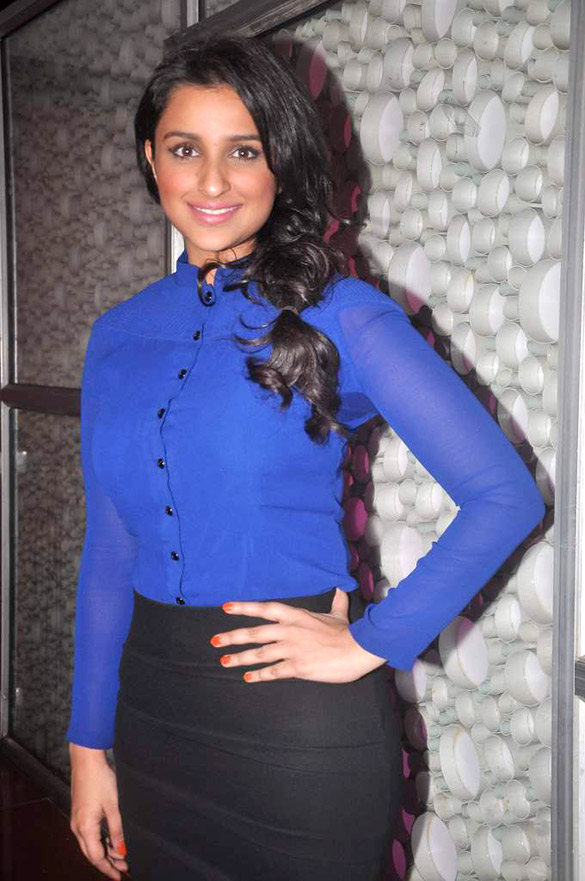
Parineeti Chopra (Best Supporting Actress)

| Best Film | Best Director |
|---|---|
| Zindagi Na Milegi Dobara – Eros International, Excel Entertainment and UTV Motion Pictures; Bodyguard – Funky Buddha Productions, Reel Life Productions and Reliance Entertainment; No One Killed Jessica – UTV Spotboy; Rockstar – Shree Ashtavinayak Cine Vision Ltd and Eros International; The Dirty Picture – ALT Entertainment and Balaji Motion Pictures | Zoya Akhtar – Zindagi Na Milegi Dobara; Imtiaz Ali – Rockstar; Milan Luthria – The Dirty Picture; Raj Kumar Gupta – No One Killed Jessica; Rohit Shetty – Singham |
| Best Actor In A Leading Role | Best Actress In A Leading Role |
| Ranbir Kapoor – Rockstar as Janardhan Jakhar (JJ) / Jordan; Ajay Devgn – Singham as Inspector Bajirao Singham; Amitabh Bachchan – Aarakshan as Prabhakar Anand; Hrithik Roshan – Zindagi Na Milegi Dobara as Arjun; Salman Khan – Bodyguard as Lovely Singh; Shah Rukh Khan – Don 2 as Don | Vidya Balan – The Dirty Picture as Reshma/Silk; Kangana Ranaut – Tanu Weds Manu as Tanuja Trivedi (Tanu); Kareena Kapoor – Bodyguard as Divya; Mahie Gill – Saheb, Biwi Aur Gangster as Madhavi; Priyanka Chopra – 7 Khoon Maaf as Susanna Anna-Marie Johannes |
| Best Actor In A Supporting Role | Best Actress In A Supporting Role |
| Farhan Akhtar – Zindagi Na Milegi Dobara as Imraan; Abhay Deol – Zindagi Na Milegi Dobara as Kabir; Emraan Hashmi – The Dirty Picture as Abraham; Naseeruddin Shah – The Dirty Picture as Suryakant; Randeep Hooda – Saheb, Biwi Aur Gangster as Lalit/Babloo | Parineeti Chopra – Ladies vs Ricky Bahl as Dimple Chaddha; Divya Dutta – Stanley Ka Dabba as Ms. Rosy; Kalki Koechlin – Zindagi Na Milegi Dobara as Natasha; Sonali Kulkarni – Singham as Megha Kadam; Swara Bhasker – Tanu Weds Manu as Payal |
| Male Debutant Star | Female Debutant Star |
| Vidyut Jamwal – Force as Vishnu | Parineeti Chopra – Ladies vs Ricky Bahl as Dimple Chaddha |
| Best Performance In A Comic Role | Best Performance In A Negative Role |
| Riteish Deshmukh – Double Dhamaal as Roy; Deepak Dobriyal – Tanu Weds Manu as Pappi; Divyendu Sharma – Pyaar Ka Punchnama as Nishant aka Liquid; Paresh Rawal – Ready as Balidaan Bhardwaj; Pitobash – Shor in the City as Mandook | Prakash Raj – Singham as Jaikant Shikre; Boman Irani – Don 2 as Vardhaan; Irrfan Khan – 7 Khoon Maaf as Wasiullah Khan; Naseeruddin Shah – The Dirty Picture as Suryakant; Vidyut Jamwal – Force as Vishnu |
Best Story
Zindagi Na Milegi Dobara – Reema Kagti and Zoya Akhtar; Rockstar – Imtiaz Ali; Stanley Ka Dabba – Amole Gupte; Tanu Weds Manu – Himanshu Sharma; The Dirty Picture – Rajat Aroraa

=== Musical awards ===
| Best Music Direction | Best Lyrics |
|---|---|
| A.R. Rahman – Rockstar; Vishal–Shekhar – Ra.One; Vishal Bhardwaj – 7 Khoon Maaf; Shankar–Ehsaan–Loy – Zindagi Na Milegi Dobara; Sohail Sen – Mere Brother Ki Dulhan | "Naadan Parindey" from Rockstar – Irshad Kamil; "Teri Meri" from Bodyguard – Shabbir Ahmed; "Darling" from 7 Khoon Maaf – Gulzar; "Khwabon Ke Parindey" from Zindagi Na Milegi Dobara – Javed Akhtar; "Ishq Sufiyana" from The Dirty Picture – Rajat Aroraa |
| Best Male Playback Singer | Best Female Playback Singer |
| Mohit Chauhan for "Naadan Parindey" – Rockstar; Ash King for "I Love You" – Bodyguard; Mika Singh for "Subha Hone Na De" – Desi Boyz; Kamal Khan for "Ishq Sufiana" – The Dirty Picture; Rahat Fateh Ali Khan for "Teri Meri" – Bodyguard | Shreya Ghoshal for "Teri Meri" – Bodyguard; Harshdeep Kaur for "Katiya Karun" – Rockstar; Shreya Ghoshal for "Ooh La La" – The Dirty Picture; Sunidhi Chauhan for "Te Amo" – Dum Maaro Dum; Usha Uthup and Rekha Bhardwaj for "Darling" – 7 Khoon Maaf |
| Best Song Recording | Best Background Score |
| Ra.One – Vishal–Shekhar for "Chammak Challo" | Rockstar – A. R. Rahman |

=== Technical awards ===
| Best Action | Best Special Effects |
|---|---|
| Singham – Jai Singh Nijjar | Ra.One – Red Chillies VFX |
| Best Choreography | Best Cinematography |
| Zindagi Na Milegi Dobara – Bosco-Caesar for "Señorita" | Zindagi Na Milegi Dobara – Carlos Catalan |
| Best Costume Design | Best Dialogue |
| The Dirty Picture – Niharika Khan | The Dirty Picture – Rajat Aroraa |
| Best Editing | Best Makeup |
| Zindagi Na Milegi Dobara – Anand Subaya | The Dirty Picture – Vikram Gaikwad |
| Best Production Design | Best Screenplay |
| Ra.One – Sabu Cyril | Zindagi Na Milegi Dobara – Reema Kagti and Zoya Akhtar |
| Best Sound Mixing | Best Sound Recording |
| Zindagi Na Milegi Dobara – Anuj Mathur and Baylon Fonseca | Ra.One – Resul Pookutty and Amrit Pritam Dutta |

=== Special awards ===
| Category | Recipient(s) |
|---|---|
| Hottest Pair of the Year | Ranbir Kapoor & Nargis Fakhri (for Rockstar) |
| IIFA Lifetime Achievement Award | Rekha |
| Special Award for Cinema at 100 | Zohra Sehgal |
| IIFA outstanding contribution to Environment | Dia Mirza |
| IIFA outstanding contribution to Indian Cinema (Male) | Ramesh Sippy |
| IIFA outstanding contribution to Indian Cinema (Female) | Vijayashanti |
| IIFA outstanding contribution to International Cinema | Liv Ullmann |

== Superlatives ==
Films with multiple nominations
| Nominations | Film |
|---|---|
| 10 | The Dirty Picture |
| 9 | Zindagi Na Milegi Dobara |
| 8 | Rockstar |
| 7 | Bodyguard |
| 5 | 7 Khoon Maaf |
| 4 | Singham |
| 4 | Tanu Weds Manu |
| 2 | Don 2 |
| 2 | No One Killed Jessica |
| 2 | Saheb, Biwi Aur Gangster |
| 2 | Stanley Ka Dabba |

Films with multiple awards
| Awards | Film |
|---|---|
| 9 | Zindagi Na Milegi Dobara |
| 6 | Rockstar |
| 4 | Ra.One |
| 4 | The Dirty Picture |
| 2 | Ladies vs Ricky Bahl |
| 2 | Singham |

== See also ==
- International Indian Film Academy Awards
- Bollywood
- Cinema of India
