= 12th IIFA Awards =

Indian film award ceremony in 2011

- The official logo of the 12th IIFA Awards
- Date: 23 June 2011– 25 June 2011
- Site: Rogers Centre; Ricoh Coliseum, Toronto
- Hosted by: Boman Irani; Ritesh Deshmukh

Highlights
- Best Picture: Dabangg
- Best Direction: Karan Johar (My Name is Khan)
- Best Actor: Shahrukh Khan (My Name is Khan)
- Best Actress: Anushka Sharma (Band Baaja Baaraat)
- Most awards: Dabangg (10)
- Most nominations: Dabangg (15)

Television coverage
- Channel: Star Plus
- Network: STAR TV
- Duration: 2 hours, 47 minutes

The 2011 IIFA Awards, officially the 12th International Indian Film Academy Awards ceremony, presented by the International Indian Film Academy honoured the best films of 2010 and took place between 23 and 25 June 2011. The official ceremony took place on 25 June 2011, at the Rogers Centre in Toronto, Ontario, Canada. During the ceremony, IIFA Awards were awarded in 24 competitive categories. The ceremony was televised in India and internationally on Star Plus. Actors Boman Irani and Ritesh Deshmukh co-hosted the ceremony for the fourth time.

In related events, the IIFA Music and Fashion Extravaganza took place on 24 June 2011 at the Ricoh Coliseum. The event was hosted by Karan Johar (Best Director winner) and Anushka Sharma (Best Actress winner). During the event, all technical awards and one musical award were presented to the winners.

Once Upon a Time in Mumbaai led the ceremony with 12 nominations, followed by Dabangg with 11 nominations, Ishqiya and Raajneeti with 9 nominations each, Band Baaja Baaraat with 8 nominations, and My Name Is Khan with 7 nominations.

Dabangg won 10 awards, including Best Film, Best Female Debut (for Sonakshi Sinha) and Best Villain (for Sonu Sood), thus becoming the most-awarded film at the ceremony.

Band Baaja Baaraat and Once Upon a Time in Mumbaai were the runners-up of the ceremony with 5 awards each. Other multiple winners include I Hate Luv Storys, Robot and Udaan with 3 awards each. In addition, Guzaarish, Housefull and Love Sex aur Dhokha, each received 1 award.

== Background ==
This was the first time the IIFA Awards were held in Canada and North America. Toronto's large South Asian population likely influenced the choice as a host city (Ontario is the province with the most Indo-Canadians at 573,250 with 484,655 in the Greater Toronto Area). The award ceremonies are held in various places around the world and has not necessarily been held in locale with a large South Asian population.

The awards ceremony was telecasted on 24 July 2011 on Star Plus.

== Winners and nominees ==
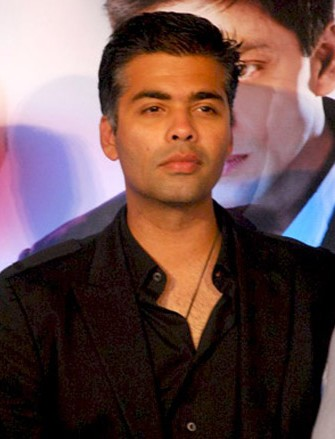
Karan Johar (Best Director for My Name is Khan)

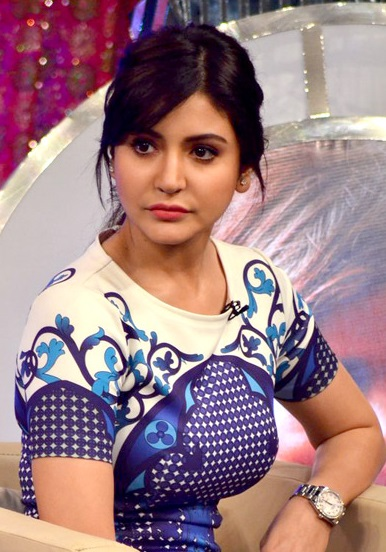
Anushka Sharma (Best Actress for Band Baaja Baaraat)

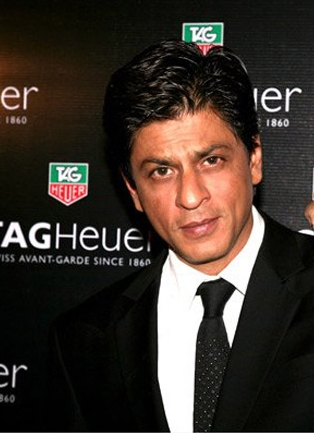
Shahrukh Khan (Best Actor for My Name is Khan)

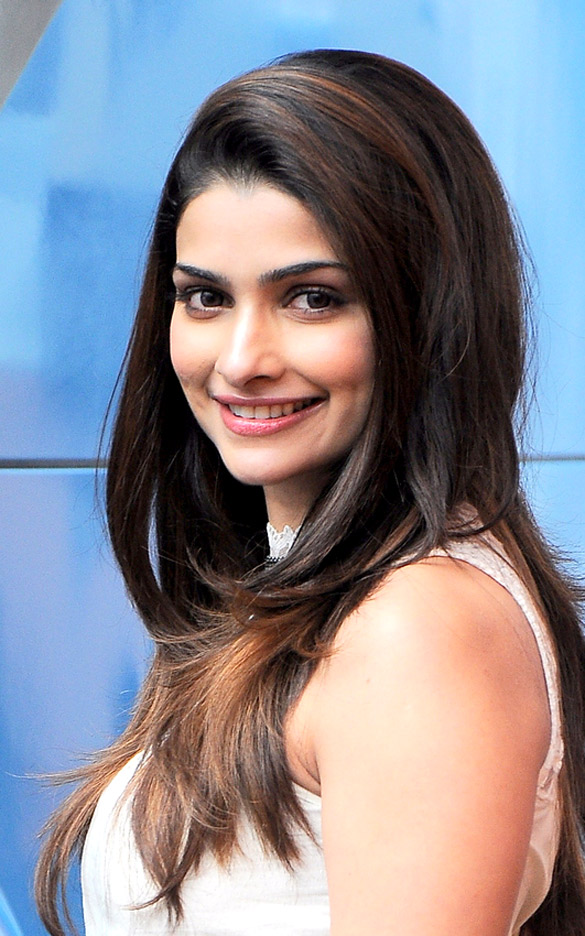
Prachi Desai (Best Supporting Actress for Once Upon a Time in Mumbaai)

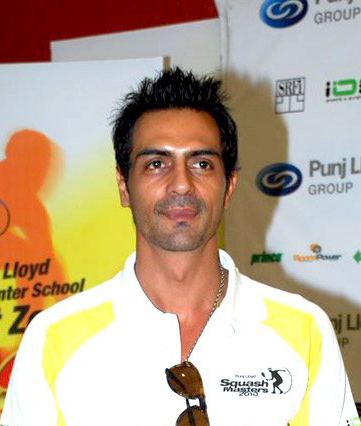
Arjun Rampal (Best Supporting Actor for Raajneeti)

The list of winners of the awards is given below. Winners are listed first, and highlighted in boldface.

=== Popular awards ===
Best Picture	Best Director
**Dabangg – Arbaaz Khan Productions**; Band Baaja Baaraat – Yash Raj Films; My Name Is Khan – Dharma Productions and Red Chillies Entertainment; Once Upon a Time in Mumbaai – Balaji Motion Pictures; Raajneeti – Prakash Jha Productions, WalkWater Media and UTV Motion Pictures	**Karan Johar – My Name is Khan**; Maneesh Sharma – Band Baaja Baaraat; Abhinav Kashyap – Dabangg; Sanjay Leela Bhansali – Guzaarish; Milan Luthria – Once Upon a Time in Mumbaai; Vikramaditya Motwane – Udaan
Best Performance In A Leading Role Male	Best Performance In A Leading Role Female
**Shah Rukh Khan – My Name is Khan as Rizwan Khan**; Ajay Devgan – Once Upon a Time in Mumbaai as Sultan Mirza; Hrithik Roshan – Guzaarish as Ethan Mascarenhas; Ranbir Kapoor – Raajneeti as Samar Pratap; Salman Khan – Dabangg as Chulbul 'Robin Hood' Pandey	**Anushka Sharma – Band Baaja Baaraat as Shruti Kakkar**; Aishwarya Rai – Guzaarish as Sofia D'Souza/Mascarenhas; Kareena Kapoor – Golmaal 3 as Daboo; Katrina Kaif – Raajneeti as Indu Pratap; Vidya Balan – Ishqiya as Krishna Verma
Best Performance In A Supporting Role Male	Best Performance In A Supporting Role Female
**Arjun Rampal – Raajneeti as Prithviraj Pratap**; Arshad Warsi – Ishqiya as Razzak Hussain; Emraan Hashmi – Once Upon a Time in Mumbaai as Shoaib Khan; Manoj Bajpayee – Raajneeti as Veerendra Pratap; Mithun Chakraborty – Golmaal 3 as Pritam	**Prachi Desai – Once Upon a Time in Mumbaai as Mumtaz**; Amrita Puri – Aisha as Shefali Thakur; Dimple Kapadia – Dabangg as Naini Devi; Ratna Pathak – Golmaal 3 as Geeta; Shernaz Patel – Guzaarish as Devyani Dutta
Best Performance In A Comic Role	Best Performance In A Negative Role
**Ritesh Deshmukh – Housefull as Babu Rao (Bob)**; Anil Kapoor – No Problem as Sr. Insp Arjun Singh; Johny Lever – Golmaal 3 as Pappi Bhai; Paresh Rawal – Atithi Tum Kab Jaoge? as Lambodar Chacha; Pradhuman Singh – Tere Bin Laden as Noora / Osama bin Laden	**Sonu Sood – Dabangg as Chedi Singh**; Ajay Devgan – Raajneeti as Sooraj Kumar; Emraan Hashmi – Once Upon a Time in Mumbaai as Shoaib Khan; Manoj Bajpayee – Raajneeti as Veerendra Pratap; Naseeruddin Shah – Allah Ke Banday as Warden; Ronit Roy – Udaan as Bhairav
Male Debutant Star	Female Debutant Star
**Ranveer Singh – Band Baaja Baaraat as Bittoo Sharma**	**Sonakshi Sinha – Dabangg as Rajo**

=== Music ===
Best Music Director	Best Lyrics
**Sajid–Wajid & Lalit Pandit – Dabangg**; Pritam – Once Upon A Time In Mumbaai; Salim–Sulaiman – Band Baaja Baaraat; Shankar–Ehsaan–Loy – My Name is Khan; Vishal–Shekhar – I Hate Luv Storys; Vishal Bhardwaj – Ishqiya	**"Sajdaa" from My Name is Khan – Niranjan Iyengar**; "Ainvayi Ainvayi" from Band Baaja Baaraat – Amitabh Bhattacharya; "Tere Mast Mast" from Dabangg – Faraz Anwar; "Dil Toh Bachcha Ji" from Ishqiya – Gulzar; "Pee Loon" from Once Upon A Time In Mumbaai – Irshad Kamil
Best Male Playback Singer	Best Female Playback Singer
**Rahat Fateh Ali Khan for "Tere Mast Mast Do Nain" – Dabangg**; Mohit Chauhan for "Pee Loon" – Once Upon A Time In Mumbaai; Rahat Fateh Ali Khan for "Dil Toh Bachcha Hai Ji" – Ishqiya; Shafqat Amanat Ali for "Bin Tere" – I Hate Luv Storys; Shankar Mahadevan for "Uff Teri Adaa" – Karthik Calling Karthik; Vishal Dadlani for "Adhoore" – Break Ke Baad	**Mamta Sharma for "Munni Badnaam Hui" – Dabangg**; Rekha Bhardwaj for "Ab Mujhey Koi" – Ishqiya; Shreya Ghoshal for "Bahara" – I Hate Luv Storys; Sunidhi Chauhan for "Ainvayi Ainvayi" – Band Baaja Baaraat; Sunidhi Chauhan for "Sheila Ki Jawani" – Tees Maar Khan
Best Background Score	Best Song Recording
**My Name Is Khan – Shankar–Ehsaan–Loy**	**Band Baaja Baaraat – Vijay Dayal for "Ainvayi Ainvayi"**

=== Technical ===
Best Story	Best Screenplay
**My Name is Khan – Shibani Bathija**; Band Baaja Baaraat – Maneesh Sharma; Ishqiya – Abhishek Chaubey; Once Upon A Time In Mumbaai – Rajat Aroraa; Udaan – Anurag Kashyap and Vikramaditya Motwane	**Dabangg – Dilip Shukla and Abhinav Kashyap**; Guzaarish – Sanjay Leela Bhansali and Bhavani Iyer; Ishqiya – Abhishek Chaubey, Sabrina Dhawan and Vishal Bhardwaj; My Name Is Khan – Shibani Bathija; Once Upon A Time In Mumbaai – Rajat Arora; Raajneeti – Anjum Rajabali and Prakash Jha
Best Dialogue
**Vishal Bhardwaj for Ishqiya**; Dilip Shukla and Abhinav Kashyap for Dabangg; Habib Faisal for Band Baaja Baaraat; Prakash Jha for Raajneeti; Rajat Aroraa for Once Upon A Time In Mumbaai

=== Technical awards ===
Best Art Direction	Best Action
**Robot – Sabu Cyril**	**Dabangg – Vijayen Master**
Best Cinematography	Best Choreography
**Guzaarish – Sudeep Chatterjee**	**Dabangg – Farah Khan for Munni Badnaam Hui**
Best Costume Design	Best Editing
**Band Baaja Baaraat – Niharika Khan**	**Band Baaja Baaraat – Namrata Rao**
Best Makeup	Best Sound Recording
**Robot – Banu**	**Love Sex aur Dhokha – Pritam Das**
Best Sound Re-Recording	Best Special Effects
**Dabangg – Leslie Fernandes**	**Robot – Indian Artists**

=== Special awards ===
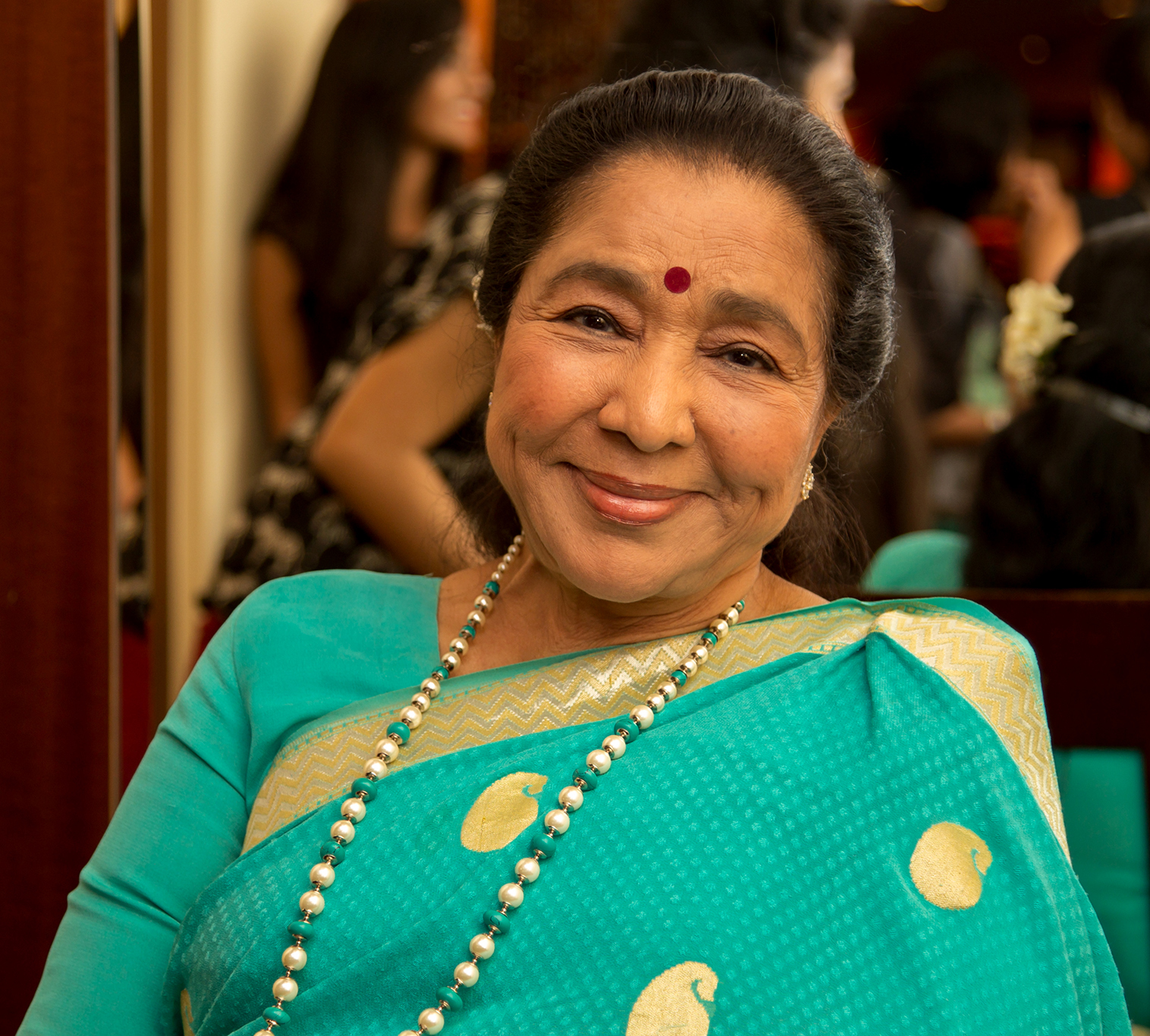
Asha Bhosle, Lifetime Achievement Award winner

==== Green Globe Award ====
- Priyanka Chopra

==== Star Plus Hottest Pair ====
- Anushka Sharma and Ranveer Singh

==== Outstanding Achievement in Cinema ====
- Sharmila Tagore **(Indian Cinema)**
- Irrfan Khan **(International Cinema)**

==== Lifetime Achievement Award ====
- Sharmila Tagore
- Asha Bhosle

== Superlatives ==
Films with multiple nominations
Nominations	Film
12	Once Upon a Time in Mumbaai
11	Dabangg
9	Ishqiya
9	Raajneeti
8	Band Baaja Baaraat
7	My Name Is Khan
5	Guzaarish
4	Golmaal 3
3	I Hate Luv Storys
3	Udaan

Films with multiple awards
Awards	Film
10	Dabangg
5	Band Baaja Baaraat
5	My Name Is Khan
3	Robot

== Presenters and performers ==
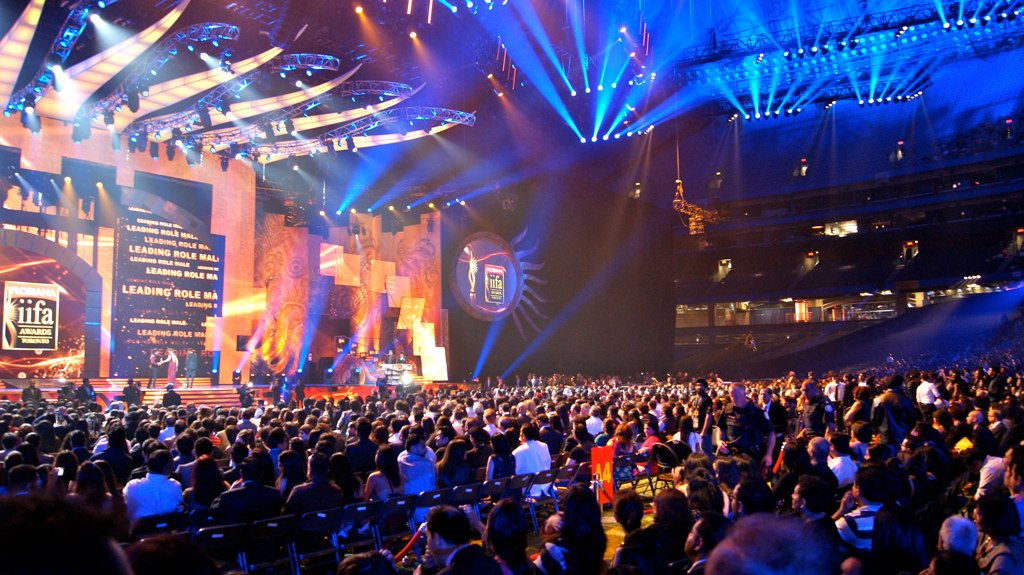
The awards ceremony in the Rogers Centre

The following individuals presented awards or performed musical numbers.

=== Presenters ===
Presenters (in order of appearance)

Name(s)	Role
Anil Kapoor	Introduced Praful Patel, Minister of Heavy Industries and Public Enterprises in India and Dalton McGuinty, Premier of Ontario
Dalton McGuinty	Introduced special welcoming presentation of Ontario, Canada
Nehal Modi; Arshad Warsi	Presenters of the award for Best Playback Singer (Female)
Nikhil Dwivedi; Mahi Gill	Presenters of the award for Best Playback Singer (Male)
Sohail Khan; Dino Morea; Rahul Khanna	Presenters of the award for Best Lyrics
Bhushan Kumar; Genelia D'Souza	Presenters of the award for Best Music
Sachiin J Joshi	Introduced the first look at "Aazaan", one of the most expensive Bollywood films to date
Sridevi	Presenter of the award for Best Story
Sajid Nadiadwala; Fardeen Khan; Brett Lee	Presenters of the award for Best Screenplay
Zeenat Aman; Rakeysh Omprakash Mehra; Sanch Atwal	Presenters of the award for Best Dialogue
Shahrukh Khan; Ramesh Sippy	Presenters of the award for Lifetime Achievement Award (Male)
Karan Johar	Introduced Shabana Azmi, Ameesha Patel, Lisa Ray and Nithan Krurejar
Shabana Azmi	Presenter of the award for Outstanding Achievement in Indian Cinema
Ameesha Patel; Lisa Ray; Nithan Krurejar	Presenters of the award for Star Plus Hottest Pair
Dia Mirza; Shashi Tharoor; Maneesh Sharma	Presenters of the Green Globe Award
Rishi Kapoor; Neetu Singh	Presenters of the award for Debutant Star Award (Male)
Hema Malini; Esha Deol; Arjan Bajwa	Presenters of the award for Debutant Star Award (Female)
Dia Mirza; Zayed Khan; Sahil Sangha	Presenters of the award for Best Performance in a Comic Role and Introduced the first trailer for Love Breakups Zindagi
Mallika Sherawat; Brian J. White	Presenters of the award for Best Performance in a Negative Role
Vidhu Vinod Chopra; Anushka Sharma	Presenters of the award for Outstanding Achievement in International Cinema
Priyanka Chopra; Subhash Ghai	Presenters of the award for Lifetime Achievement Award (Female)
Sharman Joshi; Neha Dhupia	Presenters of the award for Best Performance in a Supporting Role (Female)
Simran; Vivek Oberoi; Sunil Jain	Presenters of the award for Best Performance in a Supporting Role (Male)
Shilpa Shetty; Rajiv Jain	Presenters of the award for Best Performance in a Leading Role (Female)
Hilary Swank; Anil Kapoor	Presenters of the award for Best Performance in a Leading Role (Male)
Bipasha Basu; Cuba Gooding, Jr.	Presenters of the award for Best Director
Rajkumar Hirani; Dalton McGuinty	Presenters of the award for Best Film

=== Performers ===
Performers (in order of appearance)

Name(s)	Notes
Ontario Premier Dalton McGuinty; Mandy May Cheetham; Oliver Pigott	Discover Ontario Opening Ceremony Performance
Kangana Ranaut	
Sunny Deol; Bobby Deol	
Dharmendra	Recipient of the Lifetime Achievement Award (Male)
Arjun Rampal	Danced to "Sheela Ki Jawani" with Boman Irani and Ritesh Deshmukh
Karan Johar; Shilpa Shetty	Danced to "Zubbi Dubbi" with Boman Irani and Ritesh Deshmukh
Bipasha Basu	
Ranveer Singh; Sonakshi Sinha	Winners of the Debutant Star Award (Male) and (Female)
Priyanka Chopra	Recipient of the IIFA Green Globe Award
Shahrukh Khan	Winner of Best Performance in a Leading Role (Male)

== Controversies ==
=== Shahrukh Khan and stage crasher ===
While co-hosting the Music Awards, a man jumped on stage and clamped himself to Shahrukh Khan's injured leg. He was later removed from the stage, when Shahrukh said "You're hurting my leg. Please move!". But, Shahrukh did agree to meet after the show upon the request of the man.

== See also ==
- International Indian Film Academy Awards
- Bollywood
- Cinema of India
