= 4th Mirchi Music Awards =

Indian film music awards in 2012

- Sponsored by: Royal Stag
- Date: March 21, 2012
- Location: Bhavan’s College Ground (Andheri), Mumbai
- Country: India
- Presented by: Radio Mirchi
- Hosted by: Shaan and Usha Uthup

Highlights
- Most awards: Rockstar (5)
- Most nominations: Rockstar (12)
- Song of the Year: "Senorita" - Zindagi Na Milegi Dobara
- Album of the Year: Rockstar
- Website: Music Mirchi Awards 2011

Television/radio coverage
- Network: Colors

The 4th Mirchi Music Awards, presented by the Radio Mirchi, honoured the best of Hindi music from the year 2011. The ceremony was held on 21 March 2012 at the Bhavan's College Ground (Andheri), Mumbai and was hosted by Shaan and Usha Uthup. There were many performances, including those by Saif Ali Khan, Parikrama, Shreya Ghoshal, Bappi Lahiri and Mika Singh. There was a live jugalbandi featuring Shankar–Ehsaan–Loy, Lalit Pandit, Salim–Sulaiman, Ram Sampath, Sajid–Wajid and Leslie Lewis. Ash King, Harshdeep Kaur, Neha Bhasin, Anushka Manchanda, Yo Yo Honey Singh, Tochi Raina, Shweta Pandit, Dominique and Clinton Cerejo, Kamal Khan, Suman Shridhar, Shefali Alvares, Benny Dayal and Ritu Pathak also performed during the award show. Rockstar won a leading five awards including Album of the Year. Song of the Year went to "Senorita" from Zindagi Na Milegi Dobara. The show was broadcast on 31 March 2012 on Colors.

== Winners and nominees ==
The winners were selected by the members of jury, chaired by Javed Akhtar. They met on 6 March 2012 to close in on the nominations and decide on the winners. The following are the names of nominees and winners.

(Winners are listed first, highlighted in boldface.)

=== Film awards ===
Song of the Year	Album of the Year
**"Senorita"** - **Zindagi Na Milegi Dobara**; "Chammak Challo" - Ra.One; "Nadaan Parinde" - Rockstar; "Sadda Haq" - Rockstar; "Ooh La La" - The Dirty Picture	**"Rockstar"** - **A.R Rahman, Irshad Kamil**; "Bodyguard" - Himesh Reshammiya, Pritam, Neelesh Misra, Shabbir Ahmed; "Ra.One" - Vishal–Shekhar, Atahar Panchi, Vishal Dadlani, Kumaar; "The Dirty Picture" - Vishal–Shekhar, Rajat Arora; "Zindagi Na Milegi Dobara" - Shankar–Ehsaan–Loy, Javed Akhtar
Male Vocalist of the Year	Female Vocalist of the Year
**Kamal Khan - "Ishq Sufiyana (Male)"** from **The Dirty Picture**; Hans Raj Hans - "Ik Tu Hi Tu Hi" from Mausam; Mohit Chauhan - "Nadaan Parinde" from Rockstar; Mohit Chauhan - "Sadda Haq" from Rockstar; Rahat Fateh Ali Khan - "Teri Meri" from Bodyguard	**Sunidhi Chauhan - "Ishq Sufiyana (Female)"** from **The Dirty Picture**; Harshdeep Kaur and Sapna Awasthi - "Katiya Karun" from Rockstar; Neha Bhasin - "Dhunki" from Mere Brother Ki Dulhan; Shreya Ghoshal - "Ooh La La" from The Dirty Picture; Usha Uthup and Rekha Bhardwaj - "Darling" from 7 Khoon Maaf
Music Composer of the Year	Lyricist of the Year
**A.R Rahman - "Nadaan Parinde"** from **Rockstar**; A.R Rahman - "Sadda Haq" from Rockstar; Himesh Reshammiya - "Teri Meri" from Bodyguard; Shankar–Ehsaan–Loy - "Senorita" from Zindagi Na Milegi Dobara; Vishal–Shekhar - "Ooh La La" from The Dirty Picture	**Javed Akhtar - "Khwabon Ke Parindey"** from **Zindagi Na Milegi Dobara**; Irshad Kamil - "Nadaan Parinde" from Rockstar; Javed Akhtar - "Senorita" from Zindagi Na Milegi Dobara; Rajat Aroraa - "Ishq Sufiyana (Male)" from The Dirty Picture; Shabbir Ahmed and Neelesh Misra - "Teri Meri" from Bodyguard
Upcoming Male Vocalist of the Year	Upcoming Female Vocalist of the Year
**Kamal Khan - "Ishq Sufiyana (Male)"** from **The Dirty Picture**; Harshit Saxena - "Haal-E-Dil" from Murder 2; Hrithik Roshan and Abhay Deol - "Senorita" from Zindagi Na Milegi Dobara; Shahid Mallya - "Rabba Main Toh Mar Gaya Oye" from Mausam	**Tia Bajpai - "Sheet Leher"** from **Lanka**; Alma Ferovic - "Aur Ho" from Rockstar; Mitika Kanwar - "Habibi" from Aazaan; Shazneen Arethna - "I Hate You (Like I Love You)" from Delhi Belly; Ujjaini Mukherjee - "Manu Bhaiya" from Tanu Weds Manu
Upcoming Music Composer of The Year	Upcoming Lyricist of The Year
**Harshit Saxena - "Haal-E-Dil"** from **Murder 2**; Hitesh Sonik - "Baanwre" from Pyaar Ka Punchnama; Hitesh Sonik - "Life Bahot Simple Hai" from Stanley Ka Dabba; Krsna - "Jugni" from Tanu Weds Manu; Prasoon Joshi - "Saans Albeli" from Aarakshan	**Seema Saini - "Sheet Leher"** from **Lanka**; Akshat Verma - "I Hate You (Like I Love You)" from Delhi Belly; Amol Gupte - "Life Bahot Simple Hai" from Stanley Ka Dabba; Imran Raza - "Hona Tha Pyar" from Bol; Priya Panchal - "Baat Jo Thi...(Yeh Dooriyan)" from Yeh Dooriyaan
Song representing Sufi tradition	Raag-Inspired Song of the Year
**"Kun Faya Kun"** - **Rockstar**; "Rabba Main Toh Mar Gaya Oye" - Mausam; "Rangrez" - Tanu Weds Manu; "Ishq Sufiyana (Female)" - The Dirty Picture; "Ishq Sufiyana (Male)" - The Dirty Picture	**"Khoya Kya"** - **Kashmakash**
Best Item Song of the Year
**"Ooh La La"** - **The Dirty Picture**; "I Hate You (Like I Love You)" - Delhi Belly; "Jalebi Bai" - Double Dhammal; "Chammak Challo" - Ra.One; "Character Dheela" - Ready

=== Technical awards ===
Best Programmer & Arranger of the Year	Best Song Recording
**"Chammak Challo"** from **Ra.One** (Recipient: **Abhijit Nalani and Giorgio Tuinfort**); "Bhaag D.K. Bose" from Delhi Belly; "Chaar Baj Gaye" from F.A.L.T.U	**"Chammak Challo"** from **Ra.One** (Recipient: **Vijay Dayal and Mark 'Exit' Goodchild**); "Awaara" from 7 Khoon Maaf; "Jo Bhi Main" from Rockstar; "Ek Junoon" from Zindagi Na Milegi Dobara
Best Background Score of the Year
**Delhi Belly** (Recipient: **Ram Sampath**); Singham; Zindagi Na Milegi Dobara

=== Non-film awards ===
Indie Pop Song of the Year
- **"Dope Shope"** from **International Villager**
  - "Allah Hu" from Jhoom
  - "Naina Tore - Rewind" from Nine Lost Memories
  - "Padharo Mhare Des" from Padharo Mhare Des
  - "Yaad Piya Ki Aaye" from Ae Dosheeza

=== Special awards ===
Lifetime Achievement Award	Khayyam
Royal Stag Make It Large Award	Dhanush and Anirudh Ravichander

=== Listeners' Choice awards ===
Listeners' Choice Song of the Year	"Naadaan Parinde" - Rockstar
Listeners' Choice Album of the Year	Rockstar

=== Jury awards ===
Outstanding Contribution to Hindi Film Music	Babla Shah
Best Album of Golden Era (1951)	Awaara
Special Recognition	Pandit Chhannulal Mishra

=== Films with multiple wins and nominations ===
Films that received multiple nominations
Nominations	Film
12	Rockstar
11	The Dirty Picture
8	Zindagi Na Milegi Dobara
5	Delhi Belly
5	Ra.One
4	Bodyguard
3	Mausam
3	Tanu Weds Manu
2	7 Khoon Maaf
2	Lanka
2	Murder 2
2	Stanley Ka Dabba

Films that received multiple awards
Wins	Film
5	Rockstar‡
4	The Dirty Picture
2	Lanka
2	Ra.One
2	Zindagi Na Milegi Dobara

‡ Won two Listeners' Choice awards

== Jury ==
The jury was chaired by Javed Akhtar and had a total of 18 members. Other members were:

- Aadesh Shrivastava - music composer and singer
- Alka Yagnik - playback singer
- Anu Malik - music director
- Ashutosh Gowariker - director, writer and producer
- Ila Arun - actress and folk singer
- Lalit Pandit - composer
- Kailash Kher - singer
- Kavita Krishnamurthy - playback singer
- Louis Banks - composer, record producer and singer
- Prasoon Joshi - lyricist and screenwriter
- Ramesh Sippy - director and producer
- Sadhana Sargam - playback singer
- Sameer - lyricist
- Shankar Mahadevan - composer and playback singer
- Sooraj Barjatya - director, producer and screenwriter
- Suresh Wadkar - playback singer
- Talat Aziz - singer

== See also ==
- Mirchi Music Awards

== Music Mirchi Awards ==
- Music Mirchi Awards Official Website
- Music Mirchi Awards 2011
