= 2012 Zee Cine Awards =

Zee Cine Awards 2012 was held at the CotaiArena in Macau.

== Sponsors ==
Pan Bahar Zee Cine Awards

== Awards ==
The official Winners are listed Below.

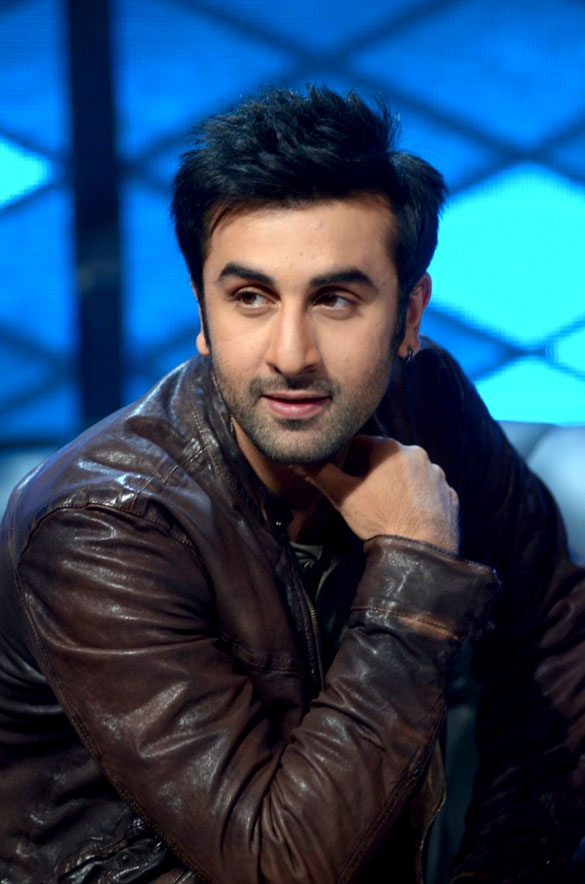
Best Actor, winner

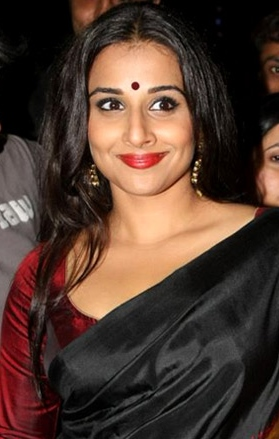
Best Actress, winner

=== Viewer's choice ===
Category	Winner	Work
Best Film	Excel Entertainment	Zindagi Na Milegi Dobara
Best Director	Imtiaz Ali	Rockstar
Best Actor	Ranbir Kapoor	Rockstar
Best Actress	Vidya Balan	The Dirty Picture
Best Track of the Year	Chammak Challo	Ra.One

=== Jury's choice ===
Category	Winner	Work
Best Film (Critics)	Ekta Kapoor	The Dirty Picture
Best Actor (Critics)	Shahrukh Khan	Don 2
Best Actress (Critics)	Vidya Balan	The Dirty Picture
Best Supporting Actor	Farhan Akhtar	Zindagi Na Milegi Dobara
Best Supporting Actress	Swara Bhaskar	Tanu Weds Manu
Best Villain	Prakash Raj	Singham
Best Comedian	Divyendu Sharma	Pyaar Ka Punchnama
Most Promising Director	Siddique	Bodyguard
Best Male Debut	Rana Daggubati	Dum Maro Dum
Best Female Debut	Parineeti Chopra	Ladies VS Ricky Bahl
Best Male Playback Singer	Mohit Chauhan	Jo Bhi Main – Rockstar
Best Female Playback Singer	Shreya Ghoshal	Saibo – Shor in the City
Best Music Director	A. R. Rahman	Rockstar
Best Lyricist	Irshad Kamil	Rockstar
Lifetime Achievement	Jeetendra	Contribution to Hindi Cinema

=== Technical Awards ===
Category	Winner	Work
Best Story	Zoya Akhtar & Reema Kagti	Zindagi Na Milegi Dobara
Best Screenplay	Imtiaz Ali	Rockstar
Best Cinematography	Carlos Catalan	Zindagi Na Milegi Dobara
Best Editing	Aarthi Bajaj	Rockstar
Best Choreography	Pony Prakash Raj	Ooh La La – The Dirty Picture

== See also ==
- Zee Cine Awards
- Bollywood
- Cinema of India
