= People's Choice Awards India =

Indian awards show

- Also known as: PCA India
- Country of origin: India
- Original language: Hindi

Original release
- Network: Colors TV
- Release: 2012

The People's Choice Awards India was an awards show held on 27 October 2012, in Mumbai, India, and which aired on Colors TV on 25 November. An adaptation of the US version, the Indian edition is licensed and produced by Bulldog Media & Entertainment, sponsored by Procter & Gamble, and the winners were voted on by the general public.

== Categories ==
The nomination categories are across four genres - Movies, TV, Music and Sports. The inclusion of a sports category with a favourite sportsperson award is unique to the Indian show.

== Nominees ==
Winners are listed in bold.

=== Movies ===
Favourite Movie	Favourite Action Movie
Agneepath; **Ek Tha Tiger**; Housefull 2; Kahaani	Agneepath; Don 2; Ek Tha Tiger; **Rowdy Rathore**
Favourite Comedy Movie	Favourite Drama Movie
Bol Bachchan; Desi Boyz; **Housefull 2**; Vicky Donor	Agneepath; Gangs Of Wasseypur; Paan Singh Tomar; **Rockstar**
Favourite Movie Actor	Favourite Movie Actress
Akshay Kumar (Rowdy Rathore); Hrithik Roshan (Agneepath); Ranbir Kapoor (Rockstar); **Salman Khan (Ek Tha Tiger)**	**Katrina Kaif (Ek Tha Tiger)**; Parineeti Chopra (Ishaqzaade); Sonakshi Sinha (Rowdy Rathore); Vidya Balan (Kahaani)
Favourite Action Movie Star	Favourite Comedy Movie Star
Akshay Kumar (Rowdy Rathore); Hrithik Roshan (Agneepath); John Abraham (Force); **Salman Khan (Ek Tha Tiger)**	Abhishek Bachchan (Bol Bachchan); Ajay Devgn (Bol Bachchan); **Akshay Kumar (Housefull 2)**; Ritesh Deshmukh (Kyaa Super Kool Hain Hum)
Favourite Youth Movie Icon	Favourite Ensemble Cast
Deepika Padukone; Imran Khan; **Ranbir Kapoor**; Sonakshi Sinha	Agneepath; Bol Bachchan; **Housefull 2**; The Dirty Picture
Favourite Debut Actor (Male/Female)
Arjun Kapoor (Ishaqzaade); Ayushmann Khurrana (Vicky Donor); **Parineeti Chopra (Ladies vs Ricky Bahl & Ishaqzaade)**; Yami Gautam (Vicky Donor)

=== Television ===
Favourite TV Comedy	Favourite TV Drama
Comedy Circus; F.I.R.; Lapataganj; **Taarak Mehta Ka Ooltah Chashmah**	**Bade Achhe Lagte Hain**; Balika Vadhu; Diya Aur Baati Hum; Pavitra Rishta
Favourite TV Comedy Actor	Favourite TV Comedy Actress
**Dilip Joshi – Jethalal (Taarak Mehta Ka Ooltah Chashmah)**; Jeetu Shivhare – Gadha Prasad (Chidiya Ghar); Kapil Sharma (Comedy Circus); Krushna Abhishek (Comedy Circus)	**Bharti Singh (Comedy Circus)**; Debina Bonnerjee – Mayuri (Chidiya Ghar); Disha Vakani – Daya (Taarak Mehta Ka Ooltah Chashmah); Kavita Kaushik – Chandramukhi (F.I.R.)
Favourite TV Drama Actor	Favourite TV Drama Actress
**Barun Sobti – Arnav (Iss Pyaar Ko Kya Naam Doon)**; Mohit Raina – Mahadev (Devon Ke Dev...Mahadev); Ram Kapoor – Ram Kapoor (Bade Achhe Lagte Hain); Samir Soni – Kunal (Parichay)	Giaa Manek – Gopi (Saath Nibhaana Saathiya); Hina Khan – Akshara Singhania (Yeh Rishta Kya Kehlata Hai); Pratyusha Banerjee – Anandi (Balika Vadhu); **Sakshi Tanwar** – Priya (Bade Achhe Lagte Hain)
Favourite Most Good Looking On-Screen Jodi (TV)	Favourite TV Crime Drama
Anandi-Shiv (Balika Vadhu); Onir-Purvi (Pavitra Rishta); **Khushi-Arnav (Iss Pyaar Ko Kya Naam Doon)**; Suraj-Sandhya (Diya Aur Baati Hum)	Adaalat; C.I.D.; **Crime Patrol**; Gumraah
Favourite Non-Fiction Show	Favourite Ensemble Cast
Dance India Dance Li'l Masters; Jhalak Dikhlaa Jaa; Kaun Banega Crorepati; **Satyamev Jayate**	**Bade Achhe Lagte Hain**; Balika Vadhu; Parichay; Yeh Rishta Kya Kehlata Hai
Favourite New TV Drama	Favourite Non-Fiction Show Host
Devon Ke Dev...Mahadev; Ek Hazaaron Mein Meri Behna Hai; **Madhubala - Ek Ishq Ek Junoon**; Punar Vivah	Aamir Khan (Satyamev Jayate); **Amitabh Bachchan (Kaun Banega Crorepati)**; Anup Soni (Crime Patrol); Salman Khan (Bigg Boss 5)

=== Music ===
Favourite Song of the Year	Favourite Movie Album of the Year
Chammak Challo (Ra.One); Chikni Chameli (Agneepath); **Mashallah (Ek Tha Tiger)**; Ooh La La (The Dirty Picture)	Agneepath; **Cocktail**; Rockstar; Rowdy Rathore
Favourite Male Singer	Favourite Female Singer
Ayushmann Khurrana (Pani Da Rang); Javed Ali (Ishaqzaade Title Song); **Kamaal Khan (Ishq Sufiana)**; Mohit Chauhan (Sadda Haq)	Kavita Seth (Tumhi Ho Bandhu); Neha Bhasin (Dhunki); Shalmali Kholgade (Pareshaan); **Shreya Ghoshal (Chikni Chameli)**
Favourite Lyricist
Amitabh Bhattacharya (Deva Shree Ganesha); Ayushmann Khurrana & Rochak Kohli (Pani Da Rang); Irshad Kamil (Tumhi Ho Bandhu); **Rajat Arora (Ishq Sufiana)**

=== Sports ===
Favourite Sportsperson
- Leander Paes
- Sushil Kumar
- **Virat Kohli**
- Viswanathan Anand

=== Special Honours ===
- Priyanka Chopra was felicitated with Favourite International Music Debut Award for her 3× Platinum Certified debut single "In My City".
- Hema Malini was felicitated with the Ageless Beauty Honour.
- Yo Yo Honey Singh was felicitated with Favourite Debut Singer for the song Angreji Beat
- 2012 Summer Olympics medalists Mary Kom, Gagan Narang, Yogeshwar Dutt and Sushil Kumar were felicitated by Katrina Kaif. The other sportspeople who were honoured were Vijay Kumar and Saina Nehwal.

== Event ==
=== Highlights ===
- Priyanka Chopra paid her tribute to Yash Chopra, who died few days before the award show.
- Many celebrities cascaded down in designer finery at the red carpet event of India's first-ever People's Choice Awards held in Mumbai. The People's Choice Awards are rewarded through votes collected by the common people.
- Bollywood's who's who were seen at the People's Choice Awards 2012 Indian edition, but Saif Ali Khan was conspicuous by his absence.
- The People's Choice Awards were held in India for the first time on 27 October 2012, in Mumbai.
- Indian actress Madhuri Dixit performed a top-notch tableau exhibiting her charming dance moves in a furious mix of many of her movie-song hits.
- In attendance were Bollywood celebrities, including Salman Khan, Amitabh Bachchan, Priyanka Chopra, Kareena Kapoor, Katrina Kaif, Ranbir Kapoor, Madhuri Dixit, Darsheel Safary, Rakhi Sawant, Ayushmann Khurrana, Parineeti Chopra, Chitrangda Singh, Ekta Kapoor, Bhagyashree, Prabhu Deva, Hema Malini and Sameera Reddy.

== See also ==
- List of Asian television awards
- People's Choice Awards
