= Niharika Bhasin =

Indian costume designer (born 1969)

Niharika Khan
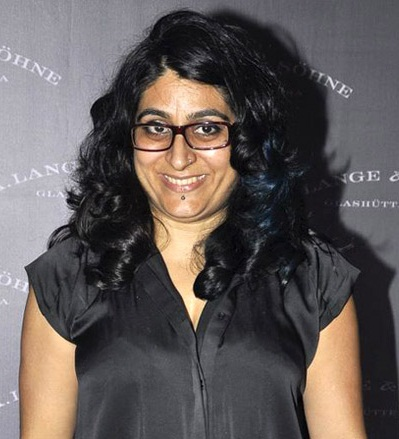
- Khan in 2012
- Born: Niharika Bhasin; 21 November 1969 (age 56)
- Occupations: Costume designer, celebrity stylist
- Years active: 2007–present
- Known for: National Award Winner for The Dirty Picture, 70s Styling for the period Movie Bombay Velvet
- Spouse: Ayub Khan (m. 2000; div. 2016)
- Children: Tahura Khan (daughter); Zohra Khan (daughter)
- Relatives: Arjun Bhasin (brother) Sanjay Bhasin (brother)

Niharika Bhasin (born 21 November 1969; formerly Khan) is an Indian costume designer who works in Hindi cinema (Bollywood), and is most known for her work in Rock On!! (2008) and The Dirty Picture (2011), for which she won the National Film Award for Best Costume Design as well as Filmfare Award for Best Costume Design.

== Early life and education ==
Born to a Punjabi father and Parsi mother. She did her bachelor's degree in public relations and HR from Seattle, US.

== Career ==
Bhasin started her career with Khoya Khoya Chand (2007). She got noticed with rocker film Rock On!! (2008), and got her big banner break with Yash Raj Films's Band Baaja Baaraat (2010).

== Filmography ==
- Khoya Khoya Chand (2007)
- Rock On!! (2008)
- Bhoothnath (2008)
- Rocket Singh: Salesman of the Year (2009)
- Karthik Calling Karthik (2010)
- Band Baaja Baaraat (2010)
- Delhi Belly (2011)
- Trishna (2011)
- The Dirty Picture (2011)
- F.A.L.T.U (2011)
- Ajab Gazabb Love (2012)
- Rowdy Rathore (2012)
- Heroine (2012)
- Inkaar (2013)
- Kai Po Che! (2013)
- Chashme Baddoor (2013)
- The Lunch Box (2013)
- Tigers (2014)
- Ungli (2014)
- Rang Rasiya (2014)
- Margarita with a Straw (2014)
- Roy (2015)
- Bombay Velvet (2015)
- Fitoor (2016)
- Fan (2016)
- Mirzya (2016)
- Shivaay (2016)
- Petta (2019)
- De De Pyaar De (2019)
- Pati Patni aur Woh (2019)
- Darbar (2020)
- Shakuntala Devi (2020)

== Awards ==
Year	Award	Category	Film	Result
2011	National Film Awards	Best Costume Design	The Dirty Picture	Won
2012	Filmfare Awards	Best Costume Design	The Dirty Picture	Won
2011	IIFA Awards	Best Costume Design	Band Baaja Baaraat	Won
2012	IIFA Awards	Best Costume Design	The Dirty Picture	Won
2020	Filmfare Awards	Best Costume Design	Photograph	Nominated

== Personal life ==
Her brother Arjun Bhasin is also a costume designer, known for Dil Chahta Hai (2001), Rang De Basanti (2006) and Zindagi Na Milegi Dobara (2011). She was married to film and television actor Ayub Khan, who is known for TV series, Uttaran (2008). Her husband is the nephew of yesteryear film stars Dilip Kumar and Saira Bano.
