= Screen Award for Best Director =

Annual film award in India

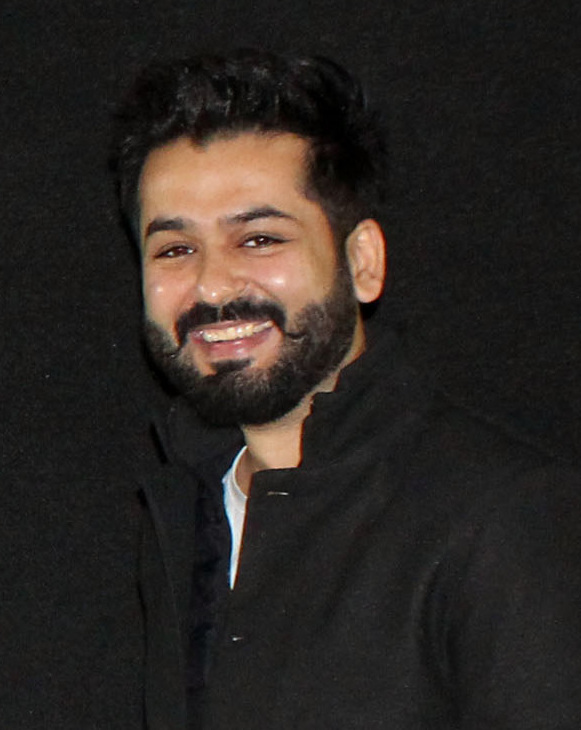
- The 2026 Recipient: Aditya Dhar
- Awarded for: "Excellence in cinematic direction achievement"
- Country: India
- Presented by: Screen India
- First award: Sooraj R. Barjatya, Hum Aapke Hain Koun..! (1995)
- Currently held by: Aditya Dhar, Dhurandhar (2026)

The Screen Award for Best Director is chosen by a distinguished panel of judges from the Indian "Bollywood" film industry and the winners are announced in January. Frequent winners include Sanjay Leela Bhansali (3), Rakesh Roshan and Ashutosh Gowariker (2)

== Multiple wins ==
| Wins | Recipient |
|---|---|
| 3 | Sanjay Leela Bhansali |
| 2 | Rakesh Roshan, Ashutosh Gowariker |

== Winners ==
| Year | Director | Film |
|---|---|---|
| 1995 | Sooraj R. Barjatya | Hum Aapke Hain Kaun |
| 1996 | Aditya Chopra | Dilwale Dulhaniya Le Jayenge |
| 1997 | Dharmesh Darshan | Raja Hindustani |
| 1998 | J. P. Dutta | Border |
| 1999 | Karan Johar | Kuch Kuch Hota Hai |
| 2000 | Sanjay Leela Bhansali | Hum Dil De Chuke Sanam |
| 2001 | Rakesh Roshan | Kaho Naa... Pyaar Hai |
| 2002 | Ashutosh Gowariker | Lagaan |
| 2003 | Sanjay Leela Bhansali | Devdas |
| 2004 | Rakesh Roshan | Koi... Mil Gaya |
| 2005 | Kunal Kohli | Hum Tum |
| 2006 | Sanjay Leela Bhansali | Black |
| 2007 | Rakeysh Omprakash Mehra | Rang De Basanti |
| 2008 | Aamir Khan and Shimit Amin | Taare Zameen Par and Chak De India |
| 2009 | Ashutosh Gowariker and Neeraj Pandey | Jodhaa Akbar and A Wednesday |
| 2010 | Rajkumar Hirani | 3 Idiots |
| 2011 | Vikramaditya Motwane | Udaan |
| 2012 | Milan Luthria | The Dirty Picture |
| 2013 | Anurag Basu | Barfi! |
| 2014 | Shoojit Sircar | Madras Cafe |
| 2015 | Vikas Bahl | Queen |
| 2016 | Tinu Suresh Desai | Rustom |
| 2016 | Kabir Khan | Bajrangi Bhaijaan |
| 2017 | Ram Madhvani | Neerja |
| 2018 | Nitesh Tiwari | Dangal |
| 2019 | Sriram Raghavan | Andhadhun |
| 2020 | Zoya Akhtar | Gully Boy |
| 2026 | Aditya Dhar | Dhurandhar |

== See also ==
- Bollywood
- Screen Awards
- Cinema of India
