= Once Upon a Time in Mumbaai =

2010 Indian film by Milan Luthria

Once Upon a Time in Mumbai
- Theatrical release poster
- Directed by: Milan Luthria
- Written by: Rajat Arora
- Produced by: Ekta Kapoor; Shobha Kapoor
- Starring: Ajay Devgn; Emraan Hashmi; Kangana Ranaut; Prachi Desai; Randeep Hooda
- Cinematography: Aseem Mishra
- Edited by: Akiv Ali
- Music by: Songs: Pritam; Score: Sandeep Shirodkar
- Production company: Balaji Motion Pictures
- Release date: 30 July 2010
- Running time: 135 minutes
- Country: India
- Language: Hindi
- Budget: ₹38 crore ($8.3 million)
- Box office: ₹85.2 crore ($19 million)

Once Upon a Time in Mumbaai is a 2010 Indian Hindi-language neo-noir crime thriller film written by Rajat Arora and directed by Milan Luthria. It stars Ajay Devgn, Emraan Hashmi, Kangana Ranaut, Prachi Desai and Randeep Hooda. Produced by Ekta Kapoor under the Balaji Motion Pictures banner, Once Upon A Time in Mumbaai was released on 30 July 2010 to generally positive reviews from critics, and was a commercial success. The film is loosely based on the lives of Mumbai underworld gangsters Haji Mastan and Dawood Ibrahim. It was made on a budget of ₹38 crore (₹28 crore for production and ₹10 crore for publicity and advertising). A sequel, Once Upon a Time in Mumbai Dobaara!, was released in 2013.

== Plot ==
The film opens in March 1993 in Mumbai, with a suicide attempt by DCP Agnel Wilson on the pretext of the recent Mumbai bombings. When questioned by his superior, Inspector General Aditya Mandke, over his actions, he breaks down and claims that the bombings are his own fault. Wilson then recounts that 18 years ago, when he was posted as the ACP in the Mumbai crime branch, his inability to take necessary action led to the rise of Shoaib Khan, a dreaded gangster who played a central role in the bombings.

Throughout the film, Wilson narrates the story of 1970s Mumbai, when it was ruled by a kind-hearted smuggler Sultan Mirza, and how Mirza's eventual downfall led to Shoaib's rise to power.

After experiencing a flood in his hometown of Madras, a young Mirza arrives in Mumbai, where he lands a job as a coal shoveller near the docks. Despite his modest earnings, Mirza consistently aids the poor and needy, earning their respect and admiration. As a result, Mirza has been given the nickname Sultan.

As a grown man, Sultan Mirza becomes the kingpin of Mumbai's smuggling underworld in the '70s. Through his influence, Mirza peacefully divides the city among four gangsters, thus thwarting police efforts to curb illegal activities. Despite being a criminal, Sultan Mirza is portrayed as a man of principle with a heart of gold and a godfather-like figure to the people, even going to the extent of refraining from smuggling specific contraband like drugs which was against his Muslim faith.

Meanwhile, Shoaib, even in his childhood was a very ambitious person with a dark and daring character, who was frequently involved in petty theft. His father, Hussain Khan, who is a Sub-Inspector with the Mumbai Police, tries in vain to guide and control his son; his anger against Shoaib began years ago when Shoaib and his best friend Javed were stealing money and got caught red handed by a man, by teaching his son a lesson, Hussain slapped him 5 times. Hussain locks Shoaib in jail, but Shoaib angers him as both Shoaib and Wilson make a deal saying that Shoaib wants to follow another path. Worried, Hussain turns to Sultan for help. Sultan agrees and helps the young man set up an electronics shop. But Shoaib is unsatisfied, as his only real ambition is to become rich and powerful, like Sultan, who is his idol.

Mirza has a crush on actress Rehana and the two eventually begin dating. Sultan invests black money in her upcoming films. Wilson moves to stop Rehana's films funded by Sultan. Later, Sultan and Rehana frame Wilson to make it look as if Wilson is accepting a bribe, which damages his credibility.

Shoaib's beautiful girlfriend, Mumtaz, works in a local jewellery shop, which Shoaib visits often, to the aggravation of her boss. Shoaib gives her a beautiful necklace, which, unbeknownst to Mumtaz, Shoaib had stolen from a lady during a home robbery. Later, that lady comes to the shop with her husband to buy more jewellery. The lady soon recognizes her own necklace being worn by Mumtaz and accuses her of allegedly stealing her jewellery and publicly insults her. Following this, Mumtaz admits to the outraged customer that her boyfriend had given the item to her. The lady and her husband demand she takes them to her boyfriend's shop, where they confront him. This enrages Shoaib, who beats up the husband and destroys his own shop.

Shoaib goes to Sultan and asks to be a part of his crime ring. Seeing his potential, Sultan agrees to take him under his wing. Shoaib learns the tricks of the trade and soon becomes Sultan's trusted aide. Wilson hatches a plan to use Shoaib's reckless ambition for quick money and power as a way to cause the downfall of Sultan. Wilson even refrains from killing Sultan and Shoaib when he has the opportunity, however Wilson's plan backfires. Finally, when Shoaib becomes invincible, Wilson blames himself for the subsequent catastrophe as he now cannot stop Shoaib's rise to power.

In 1975, Sultan decides to hand over his power to Shoaib, and opts to enter state politics. He travels to Delhi to meet the Home Minister of India Jeet Kumar Rathi. Shoaib's unscrupulous ambitions lead him to carry out trades and acts which Sultan himself would strongly condemn and abhor, including manufacturing illicit liquor, accepting contract killings, investing in drug peddling, and running extortion rackets. When Sultan returns to Mumbai, he learns of Shoaib's misdeeds and is outraged. He finds Shoaib at a party and slaps him in public for his unethical activities and states he can never really be like Sultan. This infuriates Shoaib and he plots his revenge as he now knows that Sultan and he cannot possibly rule Mumbai together due to Sultan's strong principles and moral ethos. The next day, as Sultan campaigns for his new party, Shoaib appears and assassinates Sultan while he is addressing the people at the rally as a horrified Wilson looks on, thus ending the reign of the smuggler who was loved by his people.

Back in 1993, Wilson laments that he and the police are responsible for the bombings because of their lack of forethought. Wilson also says that 18 years later, Shoaib now rules Mumbai despite living abroad, and the people are now forever at his mercy. As Mumbai's new underworld kingpin, he has since established a global criminal empire, which leaves any and all governments and forces no chance to reach him.

== Cast ==
- Ajay Devgn as Sultan Mirza (based on Haji Mastan)
- Emraan Hashmi as Shoaib Khan (based on Dawood Ibrahim)
- Kangana Ranaut as Rehana (based on Sona, Mastan's wife, and Madhubala, allegedly Mastan's crush)
- Prachi Desai as Mumtaz (based on Mehjabin Shaikh, Ibrahim's wife)
- Randeep Hooda as ACP Agnel Wilson (based on Julio Ribeiro)
- Naved Aslam as Patrick, Sultan's friend and secretary
- Dev Kharoud as Gumnaam Gumma MLA Of Punjab Bheema Father, Sultan's Best Friend (based on Gurnam Singh Gamma)
- Mehul Bhojak as Javed, Shoaib's friend
- Asif Basra as Inspector Hussain Khan, Shoaib's father (based on head-constable Ibrahim Kaskar)
- Sumit Kaul as Chhota Rajan
- Ravi Khanvilkar as Vardhan, based on Varadarajan Mudaliar
- Avtar Gill as Jeet Kumar Rathi, Home Minister of India
- Hemant Choudhary as Vijay, a film star
- Vikas Shrivastav as Verghese
- Tara Sutaria as Shreya
- Prithvi Zutshi as IG Aditya Mandke, Agnel's superior
- Gauahar Khan as item dancer in the song "Parda"

== Reception ==
=== Critical response ===
Rajeev Masand of CNN-IBN rated the film 2.5 out of 5 saying, "The film is watchable and enjoyable in parts even, but it doesn't quite pull off the retro chic tone it was going for". IANS rated the movie 3.5 out of 5 saying, "Rajat Arora's dialogues flow from the storytelling in a smooth flow of poetry and street wisdom." Taran Adarsh of Bollywood Hungama gave it 4/5 and called it "An outstanding Cinematic experience". Nikhat Kazmi of the Times of India gave it 4/5 and stated, "Once Upon A Time in Mumbaai offers you both substance and soul, even as it dabbles with a slice of reality". Rediff gave it 4/5 and said, "Book your tickets now".

== Box office ==
=== India ===
OUATIM worldwide Collections breakdown
Territory	Collections
India	Gross — ₹802.1 million
India	Nett — ₹583 million
India	Distributor share — ₹296.4 million
India	Entertainment tax — ₹204.7 million
Overseas (Outside India)	$1.1 million (₹497 million)
Overseas (Outside India)	$302,862 (United States)
Worldwide	₹852 million ($19 million)

Once Upon A Time in Mumbaai managed to have a decent weekend despite starting slowly. The film picked up from Friday evening and managed to have good Saturday and Sunday collections. The approximate breakdowns are 55.0 million (Friday), 70 million (Saturday) and 77.5 million (Sunday) for a 202.5 million weekend. The film grossed Rs. 585.0 million in India at the end of its ninth week. Once Upon A Time in Mumbaai was declared a hit by Box Office India.

=== Overseas ===
In its opening weekend the film showed a day-wise growth in U.K. [Friday £15,755, Saturday £19,381 and Sunday £19,644] and a decent start in U.S. [approx$. 137,000 at 32 venues]. In its second weekend, the film collected £16,249 on 14 screens, with the per screen average working out to £1,161. Total: £1,07,988 at U.K boxoffice. In its third weekend, the film collected £5,909 on 8 screens, with the per screen average working out to £739 (total: £122,257 in U.K.). In its fourth weekend in U.K, the film collected £743 on four screens, with the per screen average working out to £186 (total: £1,26,696). In its fifth weekend in the U.K, the film collected £105 on two screens, with the per screen average working out to £53 (total: £1,27,338). In its fifth weekend at the U.S. boxoffice, the film collected $1,131 on two screens, with the per screen average working out to $566 (total: $3,02,862).

== Accolades ==
The film received many awards at several award functions. Ajay Devgn and Prachi Desai received accolades for their nominations, while other awards were won for the film's music, playback and technical direction.

== Soundtrack ==
The film's songs were released on 18 June 2010. There were a total of 14 songs composed by Pritam with lyrics penned by Irshad Kamil, Neelesh Misra and Amitabh Bhattacharya.

The film score was composed by Sandeep Shirodkar. All Qawwali Voices By Rakesh Pandit, Sabri Brothers, Irfan And Arshad.

Additional Chorus And Backing Voice By Rana Mazumder, Anupam Amod, Joy, Clint, Mariam, Niesha.

The song "Parda" is a medley containing samples from the following 1970's Bollywood songs; "Duniya Mein Logon Ko" (Apna Desh), "Piya Tu Ab To Aaja" (Caravan). The song "I'm A Man" by Black Strobe was also used as a background soundtrack uncredited.

== Sequel ==
Due to the film's commercial and critical success, a sequel was planned. Akshay Kumar (taking over Hashmi's role) and Imran Khan were roped in as the male leads. The sequel, Once Upon a Time in Mumbai Dobaara!, features Sonakshi Sinha playing a role inspired by actress Mandakini, whilst Sonali Bendre was also roped in (taking over Desai's role). The film started shooting in August 2012, whilst the film released on 15 August 2013, thus avoids clashing with Rohit Shetty directorial Chennai Express, starring Shah Rukh Khan and Deepika Padukone, which released one week before the release of OUATIMD. The film was a flop at the box office as it had very slow opening with very low occupancy while Chennai Express was breaking various box office records throughout its release.
