= Pony Verma =

Indian dance choreographer

Pony Verma Rand
- Born: Rashmi Verma Rand; 15 September 1977 (age 49); Sonagachi, Kolkata
- Other name: Pony Prakash Rand
- Occupation: Dance choreographer
- Years active: 2000–present
- Spouse: Prakash Raj (m. 2010)
- Children: 3

Rashmi Verma (born 15 September 1977), known professionally as Pony Verma, is an Indian dance choreographer, who began her career in the year 2000. She has also done a dance reality show, Chak Dhoom Dhoom for Colors channel.

== Personal life ==
Pony Verma married actor Prakash Raj on 24 August 2010. They have one child together. A boy born in February 2016.

== Selected filmography ==
| Year | Film | Language | Role |
|---|---|---|---|
| 2001 | Yeh Teraa Ghar Yeh Meraa Ghar | Hindi | Choreographer |
| 2002 | Filhaal... | Hindi | Choreographer |
| 2003 | Baaz: A Bird in Danger | Hindi | Choreographer |
| 2003 | Hungama | Hindi | Choreographer |
| 2004 | Muskaan | Hindi | Choreographer |
| 2004 | Stop! | Hindi | Choreographer |
| 2004 | Salakhain | Urdu | Choreographer |
| 2004 | Dil Bechara Pyaar Ka Maara | Hindi | Choreographer |
| 2005 | Super | Telugu | Choreographer |
| 2005 | Ponniyin Selvan | Tamil | Choreographer for "Thachukko Thachukko" |
| 2005 | Garam Masala | Hindi | Choreographer |
| 2005 | Kyon Ki | Hindi | Choreographer |
| 2006 | Malamaal Weekly | Hindi | Choreographer |
| 2006 | Chup Chup Ke | Hindi | Choreographer |
| 2007 | Aap Kaa Surroor | Hindi | Choreographer |
| 2007 | Bhool Bhulaiyaa | Hindi | Choreographer |
| 2008 | Idi Sangathi | Telugu | Choreographer |
| 2008 | Hastey Hastey | Hindi | Choreographer |
| 2008 | Ugly Aur Pagli | Hindi | Choreographer |
| 2008 | Abhiyum Naanum | Tamil | Choreographer |
| 2009 | Chandni Chowk to China | Hindi | Choreographer |
| 2009 | 13B | Hindi | Choreographer |
| 2010 | Prince | Hindi | Choreographer |
| 2010 | Khatta Meetha | Hindi | Choreographer |
| 2010 | Guzaarish | Hindi | Choreographer |
| 2011 | Ala Modalaindi | Telugu | Choreographer |
| 2011 | Naughty @ 40 | Hindi | Choreographer |
| 2011 | Badrinath | Telugu | Choreographer |
| 2011 | The Dirty Picture | Hindi | Choreographer |
| 2013 | Zila Ghaziabad | Hindi | Choreographer |
| 2013 | Zanjeer; Toofan | Hindi; Telugu | Choreographer |
| 2014 | Un Samayal Arayil | Tamil; Telugu; Kannada | Choreographer, Associate Director |
| 2017 | Tiger Zinda Hai | Hindi | Choreographer |
| 2021 | Hungama 2 | Hindi | Choreographer |
| 2024 | Kalki 2898 AD | Telugu | Choreographer |
| 2026 | Maa Inti Bangaaram | Telugu | Choreographer for Thassadiya song |
| 2026 | Bhooth Bangla | Hindi | Choreographer |
