= Ooh La La (Shreya Ghoshal and Bappi Lahiri song) =

Single by Shreya Ghoshal, Bappi Lahiri

from the album The Dirty Picture
- Released: 30 October 2011
- Genre: Indian pop
- Length: 4:16
- Label: T-Series
- Composer: Vishal–Shekhar
- Lyricist: Rajat Aroraa

Music video
- Ooh La La on YouTube

"Ooh La La" is a song from the soundtrack of the 2011 Hindi film The Dirty Picture. The song was released by T-Series on 30 October 2011 as a single from the soundtrack. Picturised on Vidya Balan, it was composed by the duo Vishal–Shekhar, written by Rajat Aroraa, and sung by Shreya Ghoshal and Bappi Lahiri.

== Background ==
The song is a re-creation of "Ui Amma, Ui Amma, Mushkil Yeh Kya Ho Gayi" from Mawaali (1983), which was incidentally composed by Lahiri.

== Charts ==
Chart (2011)	Peak position
Asian Music Charts (Official Charts Company)	2

== Awards ==
Year	Award	Category	Recipient(s) and nominee(s)	Result	Ref(s).
2012	Global Indian Music Academy Awards	Best Playback Singer – Female	Shreya Ghoshal	Nominated	
2012	Global Indian Music Academy Awards	Most Popular Song on Radio 93.5 FM	Bappi Lahiri	Won	
2012	International Indian Film Academy Awards	Best Playback Singer (Female)	Shreya Ghoshal	Won	
2012	Lions Gold Awards	Favourite Choreographer	Pony Verma	Won	
2012	Lions Gold Awards	Favourite Playback Singer (Male)	Bappi Lahiri	Won	
2012	Mirchi Music Awards	Song of The Year	—	Nominated	
2012	Mirchi Music Awards	Female Vocalist of The Year	Shreya Ghoshal	Nominated	
2012	Mirchi Music Awards	Music Composer of The Year	Vishal–Shekhar	Nominated	
2012	Mirchi Music Awards	Best Item Song of the Year	—	Won	
