= Kamal Khan (singer) =

Indian singer

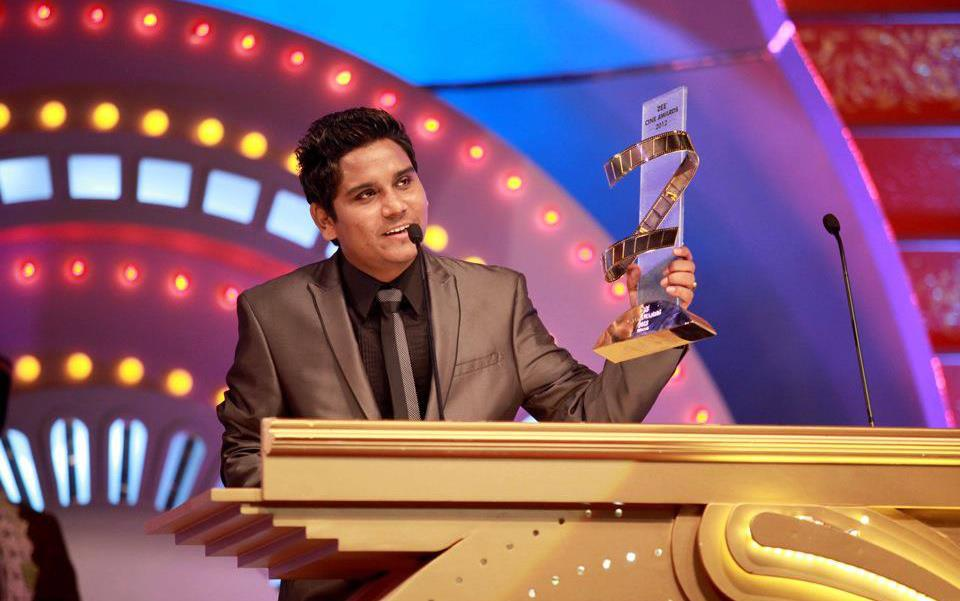
- Kamal Khan at Zee Cine Awards 2012, receiving "Fresh Singing Talent" 2012 Award.

Background information
- Born: Kamal Khan; 25 April 1989 (age 37); Patiala, Punjab, India
- Genre: playback singing.
- Occupation: Singer
- Instrument: Vocalist
- Years active: 2010 – present
- Website: thekamalkhan.com

Kamal Khan (born 25 April 1989) is an Indian singer known for his work as a playback singer in Bollywood films. He won the reality singing competition Sa Re Ga Ma Pa Singing Superstar in 2010. Later he won the Zee Cine Awards "Fresh Singing Talent 2012 (Male)" for the song "Ishq Sufiyana" from the film The Dirty Picture (2012).

In 2017, he released the Punjabi song "Dili Sara", featuring Kuwar Virk, as a single. The song became a super hit overnight. The video has over 150 million views on YouTube as of May 2022.

== Early life and career ==
Kamal was born and brought up in Reeth Kheri village, near Patiala, Punjab, to Jaswant Singh and Sarabjeet Kaur (Rani Begum), who is an employee in the health department in Patiala. Kamal started learning music at age five from his maternal uncle, Ustad Shauqat Ali Deewana ji, who became his musical mentor. His mother is also a music lover. Later he left his studies because he started taking part in singing competitions and musical shows. Until he appeared in Sa Re Ga Ma Pa, his father did not want him to become a singer. He mentioned in one of the episodes of the show, wherein his father made a guest and surprising appearance, that upon his father's advice, he started working in a factory where his daily wage was only Rs. 40 a day. On his payday, he requested his father collect his first salary. When his dad went there to get Kamal's first salary, he cried and realised that he should let Kamal pursue his singing. Kamal got his surname "Khan" from their listeners and friends when he was a contestant of Sa Re Ga Ma Pa because he likes Ustad Nusrat Fateh Ali Khan's songs, and he sings his songs like him.

== Career ==
His career turnaround came when in 2010, he was selected as a contestant on the singing reality show Sa Re Ga Ma Pa Singing Superstar. He had music director duo of Vishal–Shekhar as mentor-judge. At the grand finale, held at Andheri Sports Complex, Mumbai, on 25 December 2010, he went on to win the show, also getting a Grande MK II car and a Hero ZMR bike. Composer duo Vishal–Shekhar, who were also mentors on the show, became his real-life mentors and eventually offered him his debut playback song, "Wallah Re Wallah" in Tees Maar Khan (2010), released a day before the show ended. Later they also gave him his big break with the hit "Ishk Sufiana" for The Dirty Picture (2012). This song led to wins for Zee Cine Awards, Mirchi Music Awards, Global Indian Music Academy Awards, People's Choice Awards India, and Screen Awards awards, and international performances including a concerts in British Columbia, Canada and at the Bollywood Monster Mashup festival in Ontario, Canada. In 2013, he rose to prominence with the song "Jhooth Bolliya" from Jolly LLB. His 2017 song "Dilli Sara" was also popular.

== Albums & singles ==
Year	Song	Language
2011	Yeh Dil Hai (Punar Vivah)	Hindi
2013	Koi Panchi (Nai Soch)	Hindi
2013	Tere Naal	Punjabi
2014	Sajna Tere Aan(Saaiyan 2)	Punjabi
2014	Akhiyan Di Akhiyan Ruburoo (Collaborations 3)	Punjabi
2015	Sada Haal	Punjabi
2015	Kadke Kaalja (Album/Music: Sukshinder Shinda)	Punjabi
2015	Oh Kithey (Single) (Sony Music India)	Punjabi
2016	Meri Heer (Single) (KBS Records)	Punjabi
2016	Husan (Single) (T-Series)	Punjabi
2016	Saah (Single) (Sony Music India)	Punjabi
2016	Do Nain (Single) (KBS Records)	Punjabi
2016	Vichhrian Roohan Ft. Dr Zeus, Fateh (Single) (Speed Records)	Punjabi
2016	Instagram (Music By: Rupin Kahlon) (Single) (T-Series)	Punjabi
2017	Dilli Sara	Punjabi & English
2017	Chadra (feat. Kuwar Virk) (T-Series)	Punjabi & English
2018	Bottle Bond Vich Paa Ke (Bottle Khol 4) Ft. Thug Pun (Music By: Tru-Skool) (Single) (Game Killerz)	Punjabi & English
2018	Love Song - Kytes Media	Punjabi & Hindi
2019	Supna(Kaala Shah Kaala)	Punjabi
2019	Demand (Single) (Kamaal Records) (Music: DJ HARK)	Punjabi

== Filmography ==
Year	Film	Language	Tracks
2010	Tees Maar Khan	Hindi	Wallah Re Wallah
2011	Love Express	Hindi	Rocking Shocking Family
2011	The Dirty Picture	Hindi	Ishq Sufiana (Male)
2012	Pata Nahi Rabb Kehdeyan Rangan Ch Raazi	Punjabi	Pata Nai Rab Kehdeyan Rangah Ch Raazi
2012	Pinky Moge Wali	Punjabi	Hune Hune
2012	Future Toh Bright Hai Jee	Hindi	Akhiyan Nu Rehan De
2012	Reet	Dogri	Tere Naina
2012	Mirza – The Untold Story	Punjabi	Maula
2013	Stupid 7	Punjabi	Zindagi o Zindagi
2013	Jolly LLB	Hindi	Jhooth Boliya
2013	Sadda Haq	Punjabi	Naina
2013	Sikander	Punjabi	SIKANDER
2013	Jatt & Juliet 2	Punjabi	Naina
2013	Best of Luck	Punjabi	Raatan Lamiyaan
2013	Fer Mamla Gadbad Gadbad	Punjabi	Dil De Varke
2013	Heer and Hero	Punjabi	Heeriye
2013	Dil Saada Lutiya Gaya	Punjabi	Maula Weh
2013	Gori Tere Pyaar Mein	Hindi	Naina
2013	Lucky Kabootar	Hindi	Haal Da Marham Tu
2013	Hai O Rabba Ishq Na Hove	Punjabi	Haye O Rabba Ishq Na Hove
2014	Kaum De Heere	Punjabi	Gunahgar
2014	Disco Singh	Punjabi	Faisley
2014	Chehra	Hindi	Aaya Nahi Saayian
2014	18.11 (a code of secrecy..!!)	Hindi	Allah Teri Kya Shaan
2014	Aa Gaye Munde U.K. De	Punjabi	Tere Hi Naal
2014	Goreyan Nu Daffa Karo	Punjabi	Jane Dil
2015	Singh Of Festival	Punjabi	Bole So Nihaal
2015	Hero Naam Yaad Rakhin	Punjabi	Naina
2016	Vaapsi	Punjabi	Vaapsi Title Track and MAA
2018	Qismat	Punjabi	Awaaz
2020	Sufna	Punjabi	Ammi
2021	Shava Ni Girdhari Lal	Punjabi	"Jatt Nal Yaariyan"
2022	Moh	Punjabi	"Meri Zuban"

== Awards and nominations ==
Year	Award	Category	For The Song	Film	Result
2010	SaReGaMaPa Singing Superstar	ZeeTv Singing Reality Show	-	-	Won
2012	Screen Awards	Screen Award for Best Male Playback	Ishq Sufiana	The Dirty Picture	Nominated
2012	Zee Cine Awards	Zee Cine Award for Best Playback Singer – Male	Ishq Sufiana	The Dirty Picture	Nominated
2012	Zee Cine Awards	Fresh New Singing Talent	Ishq Sufiana	The Dirty Picture	Won
2012	Mirchi Music Awards	Male Vocalist of The Year	Ishq Sufiana	The Dirty Picture	Won
2012	Mirchi Music Awards	Upcoming Male Vocalist of The Year	Ishq Sufiana	The Dirty Picture	Won
2012	Stardust Awards	New Music Sensation (Male)	Ishq Sufiana	The Dirty Picture	Won
2012	International Indian Film Academy Awards	IIFA Award for Best Male Playback	Ishq Sufiana	The Dirty Picture	Nominated
2012	Global Indian Music Awards (GIMA)	Best Music Debut	Ishq Sufiana	The Dirty Picture	Won
2013	People's Choice Awards India	Favorite Male Singer	Ishq Sufiana	The Dirty Picture	Won
2014	PTC Punjabi Film Awards	Best Playback Singer(Male)	Dil De Varke	Fer Mamla Gadbad Gadbad	Won
2014	PTC Punjabi Film Awards	Most Popular Song of the Year	Dil De Varke	Fer Mamla Gadbad Gadbad	Nominated
2014	PTC Punjabi Music Awards	Most Romantic Balled of the Year	Tere Naal	Single	Nominated
