= Milan Luthria =

Indian filmmaker (born 1968)

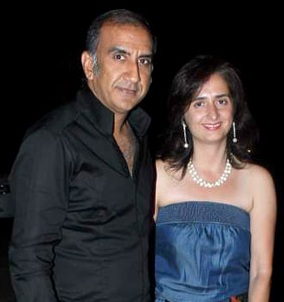
- Milan Luthria & his wife in 2012
- Born: 28 January 1968 (age 58); Mumbai, Maharashtra, India
- Occupation: Film director
- Years active: 1999 – present
- Known for: Directing the films Once Upon a Time in Mumbaai (2010) & The Dirty Picture (2011)
- Father: Raj Khosla
- Relatives: Sudhir (paternal uncle)
- Family: Bhatt family (maternal)

Milan Arjun Luthria (born 28 January, 1968) is an Indian film director who works in Hindi films. He is best known as the director of Ajay Devgan's Once Upon a Time in Mumbaai (2010) and The Dirty Picture (2011) with Vidya Balan.

== Personal life ==
Milan is the biological son of Raj Khosla. He was born out of wedlock and raised by his mother and adoptive father Arjun Luthria (the brother of actor Sudhir). His mother is the cousin of producer and director Mahesh Bhatt, Milan thus being his nephew.

== Career ==
Starting his career as an assistant director to Dharmesh Darshan for Lootere in 1993, Luthria made his directorial debut in 1999 with the successful action thriller film Kachche Dhaage. The film, released under the Tips Films banner, starred Ajay Devgan as a smuggler on the Rajasthan-Kashmir, Pakistan border and Saif Ali Khan, on the run from the Border Security Force, the Central Bureau of Investigation, and the border mafia. Luthria shot the film in Rajasthan and Switzerland. The film received a mixed reception. Although the photography of the film was praised for the scenic backdrop of the Rajasthani desert and the green valleys and snow-capped peaks of Switzerland, it was seen as a weaker film than that of Soldier, a film with similar theme which had been released the year before.

In 2002, Luthria once again worked with Devgan when he directed Chori Chori, also starring Rani Mukerji and Sonali Bendre. The film was initially scheduled for release in 2002 but during the filming the producer died and its release was delayed, eventually being released on 1 August 2003. The film received a mixed reception. Taran Adarsh, although remarking that Luthria "handled a few sequences with flourish", believed that despite an interesting storyline, the script was fundamentally flawed, "hackneyed" as he put it, believing that interest in it fizzled out by the second half of the film, becoming "sluggish" with its progression. However, Sukanya Verma described the film as "heartwarming", remarking that "like most feel good romances, Chori Chori is about letting the heart rule the head."

In 2004, Luthria directed the war drama Deewaar. The film, starring Bollywood veterans Amitabh Bachchan, Akshaye Khanna and Sanjay Dutt, is set during the Indo-Pakistani War of 1971. It features Bachchan, a major who is captured by the Pakistani army, along with over 30 soldiers during the war and is only freed 33 years later by his son, whom he has not seen since he was a child, on a rescue mission. The film was generally panned by the critics although it was a commercial success, going straight to number 1 in the Indian film charts in the week of release. Film4 wrote of the film, "A Bollywood thriller with plenty of explosive action, yet which fails to come to life. Plotting is familiar, characters bland, and a predictable storyline fails to excite or engage."

in February 2006, Luthria released Taxi Number 9211. Working with producer Ramesh Sippy, with a soundtrack composed by the new age music composing duo, Vishal Dadlani and Shekhar Ravjiani, Luthria shot the film in 2005. The film, a comedy thriller, featured John Abraham and Nana Patekar (as the taxi driver) involved in a cat-and-mouse game during a two-hour taxi trip, with financial implications. The film was a major commercial and critical success, becoming the 16th highest-grossing film in India in 2006. Film critics were impressed with the originality of the script and the unpredictability and innovative devices used in the script, as the men progressed through the metropolis.

In 2007, Luthria directed the cricket comedy Hattrick, featuring Paresh Rawal, Rimi Sen, Kunal Kapoor, Nana Patekar and Danny Denzongpa. In 2010, he directed Once Upon a Time in Mumbaai. The film again starred Ajay Devgan, but this time he played a character called Sultan Mirza who is the Messiah of the poor, fear of the rich and the authority of the powerful, the one whom people turned to when there was nowhere else to look. The silent ruler of the streets of Bombay, he did everything that was wrong according to the law, but right according to him – i.e. the "Indian version of Robin Hood". The film was produced by Balaji Telefilms and Popcorn Entertainment and was released on 30 July 2010. According to Luthria, "My film for Ekta will take a penetrating look at gangsterism in the 1980s. I'm quite enamoured by the period, quite taken up by the period and its flamboyance. There was a lot of action and inner life in some of the films during that period. I think the last film that looked at gangsterism from inside was Anurag Basu's Gangster: A Love Story".

In 2011, Milan directed the movie The Dirty Picture starring Vidya Balan, Naseeruddin Shah, Tusshar Kapoor and Emraan Hashmi. The film is based on the real-life story of the late Southern siren Silk Smitha, who Milan says he even briefly interacted with during her time in the 80s and 90s. Upon release, the film received both critical and commercial success.

In 2017, the film Baadshaho was released, becoming the fourth collaboration with Ajay Devgn, and starring Devgn, Ileana D'Cruz, Vidyut Jammwal, Emraan Hashmi and Esha Gupta.

== Filmography ==
Year	Film	Cast	Notes
1999	Kachche Dhaage	Ajay Devgn, Saif Ali Khan, Manisha Koirala, Namrata Shirodkar	
2003	Chori Chori	Ajay Devgn, Rani Mukerji, Sonali Bendre	
2004	Deewaar	Amitabh Bachchan, Sanjay Dutt, Akshaye Khanna, Amrita Rao, Kay Kay Menon	
2006	Taxi No. 9211	John Abraham, Nana Patekar, Sameera Reddy	
2007	Hattrick	Paresh Rawal, Nana Patekar, Rimi Sen, Kunal Kapoor, Danny Denzongpa	
2010	Once Upon a Time in Mumbaai	Ajay Devgn, Emraan Hashmi, Kangana Ranaut, Prachi Desai, Randeep Hooda	
2011	The Dirty Picture	Vidya Balan, Naseeruddin Shah, Tusshar Kapoor, Emraan Hashmi	
2013	Once Upon ay Time in Mumbai Dobaara!	Akshay Kumar, Imran Khan, Sonakshi Sinha, Sonali Bendre, Abhimanyu Singh	
2017	Baadshaho	Ajay Devgn, Emraan Hashmi, Ileana D'Cruz, Esha Gupta, Vidyut Jammwal	
2021	Tadap	Ahan Shetty, Tara Sutaria	
2023	Sultan of Delhi	Tahir Raj Bhasin, Mouni Roy, Anupriya Goenka	TV Series on Disney+Hotstar

== Awards ==
Year	Award	Category	For	Result
2010	BIG Star Entertainment Awards	BIG Star Most Entertaining Director	Once Upon a Time in Mumbaai	Nominated
2011	Screen Awards	Screen Award for Best Director	Once Upon a Time in Mumbaai	Nominated
2011	Stardust Awards	Stardust Award for Dream Director	Once Upon a Time in Mumbaai	Nominated
2011	Lions Gold Awards	Lions Favorite Movie Director	Once Upon a Time in Mumbaai	Nominated
2011	Zee Cine Awards	Zee Cine Award for Best Director	Once Upon a Time in Mumbaai	Nominated
2011	Apsara Awards	Apsara Award for Best Director	Once Upon a Time in Mumbaai	Nominated
2011	IIFA Awards	IIFA Award for Best Director	Once Upon a Time in Mumbaai	Nominated
2011	BIG Star Entertainment Awards	BIG Star Most Entertaining Director	The Dirty Picture	Nominated
2012	Screen Awards	Screen Award for Best Director	The Dirty Picture	Won
2012	Stardust Awards	Stardust Award for Dream Director	The Dirty Picture	Nominated
2012	Filmfare Awards	Filmfare Award for Best Director	The Dirty Picture	Nominated
2012	Lions Gold Awards	Lions Favorite Movie Director	The Dirty Picture	Won
2012	Zee Cine Awards	Zee Cine Award for Best Director	The Dirty Picture	Nominated
2012	Apsara Awards	Apsara Award for Best Director	The Dirty Picture	Nominated
2012	IIFA Awards	IIFA Award for Best Director	The Dirty Picture	Nominated
2013	Bhaskar Bollywood Awards	Best Director of The Year	The Dirty Picture	Nominated
