= Rajat Arora =

Indian screenwriter

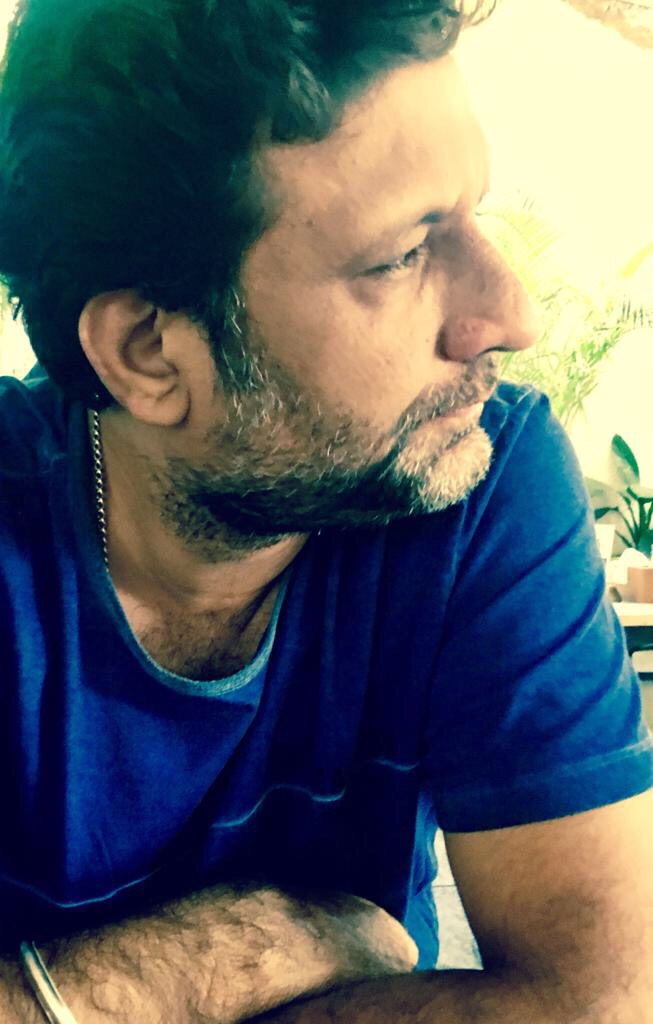
- Rajat Arora in 2017
- Born: Rajat Arora; 23 July 1975 (age 51); New Delhi, India
- Education: Asian Academy of Film & Television
- Occupation: Screenwriter
- Years active: 2004 – present

Rajat Arora (born 23 July 1975) is an Indian screenwriter of Hindi-language films and television. He has written numerous screenplays, including Taxi No. 9211 (2006), Chandni Chowk to China (2009), Once Upon a Time in Mumbaai (2010), The Dirty Picture (2011), Kick (2014), Gabbar Is Back (2015), Azhaar (2016) and Baadshaho (2017). He has also written the Indian series CID. 'He has written for the Indian television series CID and Aahat.

Arora collaborates often with director Milan Luthria.

== Early life and education ==
Arora was born in New Delhi, India. He is an alumnus of Asian Academy of Film & Television and holds a Bachelor of Commerce from Delhi University.

== Career ==
Arora wrote the dialogues for the film Bluffmaster (2005), directed by Rohan Sippy. In 2006, he worked with director Milan Luthria and wrote the film Taxi No. 9211. Luthria and Arora have since worked together for the films Once Upon A Time in Mumbai (2010), The Dirty Picture (2011), Once Upon ay Time in Mumbai Dobaara! (2013), Baadshaho (2017), Tadap (2021). In 2009, he wrote Chandini Chowk to China directed by Nikhil Advani. In 2014, he worked with Sajid Nadiadwala for Kick. In 2015, he wrote the additional screenplay for the film Gabbar Is Back, produced by Sanjay Leela Bhansali. In 2017, he worked with Luthria for the third time for Badshaaho.

In 2019, he wrote the Hindi version of Captain Marvel. In 2021, he wrote the Hindi version of the bilingual film, Thalaivii. In 2022, he co-produced the Netflix Original, Plan A Plan B.

== Filmography ==
=== Television ===
Year	Title	Credited as
2002-2007	CID	Screenwriter

=== Films ===
Year	Film	Credited as			
Year	Film	Screenplay	Dialogues	Story	Notes
2005	Bluffmaster!	No	Yes	No	
2006	Family	Yes	No	No	
2006	Taxi No. 9211	Yes	Yes	Yes	
2007	Hattrick	Yes	Yes	Yes	
2009	Chandni Chowk to China	Yes	Yes	Yes	
2010	Once Upon a Time in Mumbaai	Yes	Yes	Yes	
2011	The Dirty Picture	Yes	Yes	Yes	Also lyricist for the song ''Ishq Sufiyana''
2013	Once Upon ay Time in Mumbai Dobaara!	Yes	Yes	Yes	
2014	Kick	Yes	Yes	Yes	
2015	Gabbar Is Back	Additional	Yes	No	
2016	Azhar	Yes	Yes	Yes	
2017	Baadshaho	Yes	Yes	Yes	
2019	Captain Marvel	Yes	Yes	No	Hindi version
2021	Thalaivi	Yes	Yes	Yes	Hindi version
2021	Tadap	Yes	Yes	Yes	
2022	Heropanti 2	Yes	Yes	Yes	
2022	Plan A Plan B	No	No	No	Producer

== Awards and accolades ==
In 2004, Arora was awarded 'Best Teleplay Writer' by the Indian Television Academy. He also has an entry at the Guinness Book of World Records for co-writing CID and getting the title of 'Longest Single Shot Episode'.

Arora has also been awarded the Hindi Seva Samman for his literary contribution towards Hindi Language.

Year	Movie	Award	Category
2011	Once Upon a Time in Mumbaai	Zee Cine Awards	Best Dialogues
2011	Once Upon a Time in Mumbaai	Producers Guild Film Awards	Best Screenplay
2011	Once Upon a Time in Mumbaai	Global Indian Film and Television Honours	Best Dialogues
2012	The Dirty Picture	Zee Cine Awards	Best Dialogues
2012	The Dirty Picture	Screen Awards	Best Dialogues
2012	The Dirty Picture	Producers Guild Film Awards	Best Dialogues
2012	The Dirty Picture	IIFA Awards	Best Dialogues
2012	The Dirty Picture	Global Indian Film and Television Honours	Best Dialogues
2012	The Dirty Picture (Song: Ishq Sufiyana)	Mirchi Music Awards	Best Lyrics
2012	The Dirty Picture (Song: Ishq Sufiyana)	People's Choice Awards India	Favourite Lyrics
