= The Dirty Picture =

2011 Indian film by Milan Luthria

- Theatrical release poster
- Directed by: Milan Luthria
- Written by: Rajat Aroraa
- Produced by: Ekta Kapoor; Shobha Kapoor
- Starring: Vidya Balan; Emraan Hashmi; Naseeruddin Shah; Tusshar Kapoor
- Narrated by: Emraan Hashmi
- Cinematography: Bobby Singh
- Edited by: Akiv Ali
- Music by: Score: Sandeep Shirodkar; Songs: Vishal–Shekhar
- Production companies: Balaji Motion Pictures; ALT Entertainment
- Distributed by: AA Films
- Release date: 2 December 2011 (India)
- Running time: 144 minutes
- Country: India
- Languages: Hindi; Tamil; Telugu
- Budget: ₹18 crore (US$1.9 million)
- Box office: ₹117 crore (US$12 million)

The Dirty Picture is a 2011 Indian Hindi-language musical drama film inspired by the life of Silk Smitha, an Indian actress noted for her erotic roles. The filmmakers have clarified that the story is not officially or literally based on Smitha alone, but on many of her contemporaries such as Disco Shanti. It also resembles the personal lives of other women in popular culture, including actress and sex symbol Marilyn Monroe. The film was directed by Milan Luthria and co-produced by Shobha Kapoor and Ekta Kapoor, after Ekta came up with the idea and asked screenwriter Rajat Aroraa to pen a story based on it.

Produced on a budget of ₹18 crore (US$1.9 million), The Dirty Picture was released worldwide on 2 December 2011 (the anniversary of Smitha's birth), in Hindi, Telugu and Tamil versions. Vidya Balan, Emraan Hashmi, Naseeruddin Shah and Tusshar Kapoor star in lead roles. Upon release, it was a critical and commercial success, with Balan's performance receiving widespread critical acclaim and numerous accolades; she was called "the hero of the film". In addition, the film has received high praise for portraying women as powerful, contributing something unique to a typically male-dominated society. The film's soundtrack, composed by Vishal–Shekhar with lyrics written by Rajat Aroraa, also became a commercial success with the song "Ooh La La" become one of the chartbusters of the year.

The Dirty Picture grossed ₹117 crore (US$12 million) at the box office, with Box Office India declaring it a "blockbuster" after its fourth week. Balan won the National Film Award for Best Actress at the 59th National Film Awards for her performance in the film. At the 57th Filmfare Awards, The Dirty Picture received 6 nominations, including Best Film, Best Director (Luthria) and Best Supporting Actor (Shah), and won 3 awards, including Best Actress (Balan). Additionally, at the 17th Screen Awards, it received 10 nominations and won 6 awards, including Best Film, Best Director (Luthria) and Best Actress (Balan).

== Plot ==
In the early 1980s, on the eve of her arranged marriage, Reshma, a young woman from rural Tamil Nadu, runs away from her village to Madras with aspirations of becoming a film actress. She finds accommodation in a poor neighbourhood and begins working at an eatery run by Rathnamma, a single woman. Raised as a tomboy, Reshma attracts attention from several men because of her appearance. Despite attending numerous auditions, she is repeatedly rejected. During one audition, a casting director insults her appearance but gives her money after noticing that she is starving.

One evening, a neighbour invites Reshma to a cinema to watch a film starring her childhood idol, Suryakanth. During the screening, he sexually harasses her and offers her money in exchange for sex. Although Reshma leaves the theatre in distress, the incident leads her to reconsider how she might secure opportunities in the film industry.

Reshma later auditions as a background dancer. Her performance, characterised by sensual dance movements, impresses an assistant director. However, when the film's director, Abraham, reviews the footage, he disapproves of the performance and removes her sequence from the completed film. Reshma and Rathnamma attend the film's release expecting to see her on screen, only to discover that her scene has been cut.

Although the film receives critical acclaim, it performs poorly at the box office. Seeking to improve its commercial prospects, producer Selva Ganeshan restores Reshma's dance sequence for a re-release in B and C centres. The song proves popular with audiences and contributes to increased attendance, despite attracting criticism from reviewers for its sensual presentation.

Disheartened after believing her performance had been omitted, Reshma prepares to return to her village. Before she leaves, Selva Ganeshan locates her and offers her a dance number in his next film. He also gives her the screen name "Silk", believing it to be more distinctive and commercially appealing.

At her first film shoot, Silk performs in a dance sequence alongside the actor Suryakanth, whom she had admired since childhood. She enters into an extramarital relationship with him, believing it will strengthen her position in the film industry. Meanwhile, director Abraham proposes a new film to producer Selva Ganeshan and hopes to cast Suryakanth in the lead role. However, Abraham rejects Suryakanth's suggestion to incorporate more erotic elements and a dance featuring Silk to increase the film's commercial appeal. The disagreement leads Abraham to distance himself from Silk.

Silk gradually establishes herself as a popular performer through a series of sensual dance numbers, many of them opposite Suryakanth. Her performances become a major box-office attraction, earning her widespread fame, financial success, and recognition as a sex symbol.

Suryakanth's younger brother, Ramakanth, a screenwriter, befriends Silk after revealing himself to be an admirer of her work. As their friendship develops into a romantic relationship, Silk realizes that Ramakanth values her beyond her public image, unlike Suryakanth, who has no intention of leaving his wife. During a visit to her hometown with Ramakanth, Silk is warmly received by local residents but is rejected by her mother, who refuses to acknowledge her.

At an awards ceremony, Suryakanth dismisses Silk as nothing more than a "dirty secret." In response, Silk uses her acceptance speech to criticise the double standards of a society that condemns actresses associated with erotic films while overlooking the men who produce, distribute, and consume the same content. She declares that she will continue making such films until those attitudes change.

Silk's relationship with Ramakanth becomes public after journalist Naila criticises her involvement with both brothers. In retaliation, Suryakanth removes Silk from his upcoming projects, forcing her to work with other filmmakers who continue to typecast her in similar roles. As the film industry changes during the 1990s, leading actresses increasingly perform the glamorous dance sequences that had previously been Silk's specialty, reducing the demand for her performances. At the same time, Silk gains weight and struggles to maintain her image as a leading glamour star. Feeling threatened by the emergence of younger actress Shakeela, she deliberately trips her during a dance competition at a party in an attempt to outshine her.

The incident embarrasses Ramakanth, who had intended to introduce Silk to his parents as his prospective bride. Their ensuing argument ends their relationship after Silk insists that she is not ashamed of her public image or the roles she has played. Already dependent on alcohol and cigarettes, Silk's emotional decline accelerates, and she begins experiencing depression while her health deteriorates.

Seeking to revive her career, Silk proposes to producer Selva Ganeshan that they jointly produce a film starring her in three roles. At the same time, Abraham directs a commercially oriented film in which he also plays three characters, with Ramakanth serving as the screenwriter. The two films are released on the same day. Abraham's film becomes a commercial success, while Silk's production is a critical and commercial failure. Believing that the outcome validates his long-held views, Abraham considers it a personal victory over Silk, although he gradually begins to develop feelings for her despite his earlier resentment.

Following the failure of her film, Silk loses her wealth and accumulates significant debts due to her gambling addiction. Facing financial ruin, she approaches a low-budget filmmaker in search of work. He intoxicates her and secretly films her for a pornographic production without her consent. During a police raid on the set, Silk escapes. While wandering through the city in an intoxicated state, she experiences memories of her past and passes Ratnamma's eatery. Ashamed of her circumstances, she avoids being seen, realizing that she has returned to the same position of exploitation from which she had hoped to escape when she entered the film industry. Distraught, she returns home in despair.

Meanwhile, Abraham comes to accept his feelings for Silk after learning of her loneliness and isolation. He travels to her hometown and persuades her estranged mother to accompany him to Madras in the hope of reconciling them. Unable to reach Silk by telephone at first, Abraham finally speaks to her and becomes alarmed when she asks him to bid farewell to everyone on her behalf. He rushes to her home, where he finds her dead from an overdose of sleeping pills. She is dressed in a simple red sari and has left behind a suicide note.

Abraham and Silk's mother cremate her body. The film concludes with Abraham reflecting on Silk's life and questioning whether she or the society around her was truly at fault. He ultimately suggests that her rebellious spirit would continue even in the afterlife.

== Cast ==
- Vidya Balan as Reshma / Silk (based on Silk Smitha), a rebellious and independent woman. She runs away from her rural home at a young age to nurture her dream of becoming an actress. She is uninhibited in expressing her sexuality.
- Emraan Hashmi as Abraham (loosely based on Balu Mahendra), a director and the narrator of the film. He dreams of making critically acclaimed films. He initially hates Silk and her over-sexualization of the film industry.
- Naseeruddin Shah as Suryakanth, a flamboyant South Indian superstar. He is involved in extramarital relationships and has a secret affair with the much younger Silk.
- Tusshar Kapoor as Ramakanth, Suryakant's brother and a writer for one of his forthcoming films. Unlike his brother, he is attracted to Silk but is empathetic towards her.
- Rajesh Sharma as Selva Ganesh / Keedadas, the producer of most of Silk's films
- Mangal Kenkre as Ratnamma, Silk's friend
- Anju Mahendru as Naila, a journalist who writes sensationalist articles about Silk but secretively admires her courage.
- Neha Bam as Silk's mother
- Arya Banerjee as Shakeela, an up-and-coming young actress who compares herself to Silk
- Shivani Tanksale as Raadhika Suryakanth
- Imran Hasnee as Vijayan, a filmmaker
- Vikas Shrivastav as Sudhir, a casting director

== Production ==
=== Development ===
Ekta Kapoor launched the film with director Milan Luthria soon after their collaboration Once Upon a Time in Mumbaai became a hit. She said that The Dirty Picture is my picture it shows how life had been to me would be India's answer to the Academy Award-nominated film Boogie Nights. Later in a press conference, Kapoor clarified that neither of Balaji's forthcoming films, Ragini MMS nor The Dirty Picture, were "porn films" as they had been made out to be.

Kapoor has gone on record to add, "I would be surprised if I don't get unbelievable critical acclaim for The Dirty Picture and a national award for my actress, Vidya Balan. The film has one of the most well-written scripts I have come across and a lot of youngsters in my office have looked at it with great admiration." She pointed out that the purpose of the film was neither to justify nor criticise Smitha's life but for the audience to live her life. Additionally, all actors, including Balan and Shah attended workshops for almost two months before filming began, to familiarise themselves with the body language of their characters.

The story chose me! It was Ekta's idea; she had asked the writer to write a story based on this, and once it was done, they casually asked me to go through it. She wanted a first-time director to do it as it wasn't a big canvas and they did not have a big budget, but when I read the story I was bowled over. I told her I wanted to direct it; it was exclusive material – not those typical masala films, and I didn't want anyone else directing it.

— Milan Luthria

When screenwriter Rajat Aroraa initially started working, taking cues from producer Kapoor, the scope of the film was much smaller, primarily looking back to the soft-pornography scene of the 1980s. As work progressed, the scope gradually widened to include the controversial romances of Smitha through a fictionalised biopic. While researching for the film, director Luthria and screenwriter Aroraa found little material in magazines of that period, as "women like Silk Smitha were often ignored by film magazines, except for gossip column mentions". Thus they derived many of the details of her life from anecdotes and party gossips, and then fictionalised them. Apart from depicting the pomp of the Telugu/Tamil film industry, the screenplay takes up issues such as money management by actors, "their string of broken relationships", and the way they "led lonely lives and met with tragic ends". For inspiration, instead of looking at South Indian films of the period, the team turned to the work of mainstream Bollywood directors like Manmohan Desai, Vijay Anand, Raj Kapoor, Feroz Khan and G.P. Sippy. To put the global soft-porn industry in context, the team looked into Boogie Nights (1997) and The People vs. Larry Flynt (1996). The final script became a "fictionalised, women-oriented, generalised perspective on the 1980s film industry".

=== Casting ===
After initial talks with actresses Kangana Ranaut and Bipasha Basu fell through, Vidya Balan was offered the lead role. When Balan was narrated the script and shown sketches of what she needed to wear for the portrayal, she felt uncomfortable. Luthria added, "We couldn't have found anyone better than Vidya for this role. It's a casting that very few would think is viable because it is going to be nothing like Vidya has done before. But I am confident she will push the envelope as far as she can".

Regarding the criticism that Balan's character might evoke, Luthria clarified, "I wanted Vidya to know that what she's doing is not crass or crude but can be shown aesthetically in a sensual manner with a touch of class. What her character does, is not cheap." As a reference point, he also asked Balan to study 'similar themed' films such as Burlesque and Chicago. Balan also underwent salsa training to fine-tune herself with Smitha's languid body language.

Next, Naseeruddin Shah was cast as an ageing South Indian superstar with "hideous wigs, dark glasses and painted-on mustaches". He performed a "fast dance number" in the film, a full 22 years after he last did it in the song "Tirchi Topiwale" from Tridev (1989). Regarding his character, Ekta Kapoor stated, "This role requires him to play to the gallery, provoke claps, laughs, and whistles and I know he can pull it off because Naseer is the Shah of all actors." Luthria added, "Expect a man who unabashedly enjoys the flesh of women".

Tusshar Kapoor and Emraan Hashmi were next cast in lead roles. While it was known that Tusshar Kapoor would play the role of a script-writer and Smitha's love interest, the nature of Hashmi's role was unknown for a while. The casting received praise from trade pundits, with Taran Adarsh commenting, "Known for engaging in interesting and unconventional casting in all its previous releases, Balaji has again tackled the unheard of, by casting Emraan Hashmi and Vidya Balan – two of the most successful stars of today – opposite each other in The Dirty Picture. The perfect combination of mass and class promises to make this controversial film yet another winner from the Balaji stable."

=== Filming ===
Filming was to begin on 21 May 2011: a week after the release of Kapoor's Ragini MMS. But due to production delays, it began a week later. Balan, a religious person, organised a puja on the sets before principal photography began.

The first leg of filming took place at Mumbai's Film City where an elaborate set re-creating Chennai (then Madras) of the 80s was set up. The second schedule was shot in Ramoji Film City in Hyderabad. The song "Ishq Sufiyana" was shot at Bidar fort in Bidar, Karnataka. Filming was completed in September, before venturing into post-production, ahead of the December release.

Director Luthria wanted to depict a sense of discomfort between the two lead characters, Balan and Hashmi, a "meeting of two completely different worlds". So he didn't allow them to interact and get comfortable with each other during film workshops ahead of the shoot. Since he considered them "the unlikeliest pair to come together", he brought them together right into the shoot filming an important scene, where they had to insult each other. Though he was initially anxious, it all turned out well and he was surprised by the resulting chemistry.

== Marketing ==
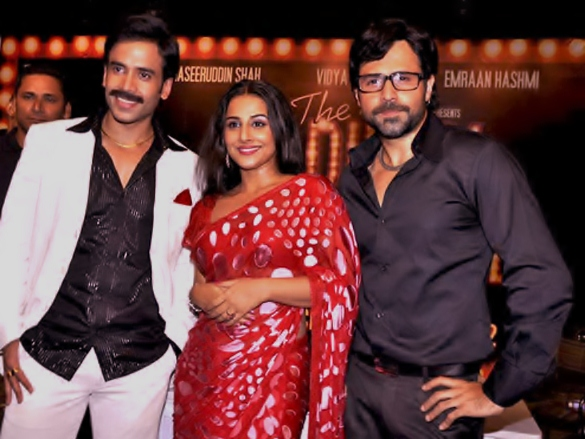
Kapoor, Balan and Hashmi at the audio launch of The Dirty Picture in 2011

The first look of The Dirty Picture and a short teaser were launched online on 26 August 2011. The enthusiastic response even prompted its producers to consider a sequel. The film's trailer on YouTube got over 500,000 hits in one day and one million hits in two days. Meanwhile, the theatrical trailer was launched on 30 August at a single screen cinema in Bandra. The space was especially decorated to recreate the retro era. Since the film is set in the 1980s, a time when multiplexes did not exist, the producers thought it would be fitting to show the première on a single screen.

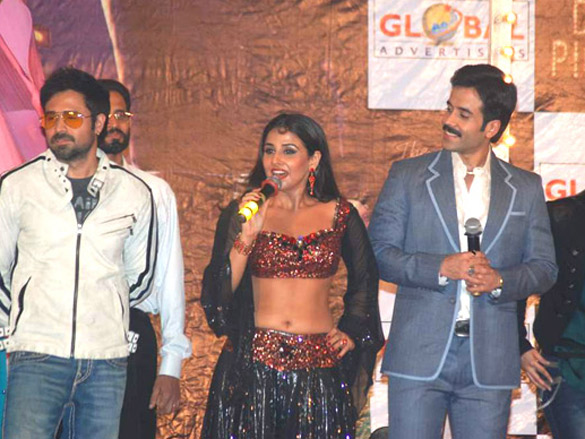
Emraan Hashmi, Vidya Balan, Tusshar Kapoor promote The Dirty Picture at Mithibai College

The lead stars created publicity by organising a promotional campaign in the festival of Mithibai College on 30 November. As a part of the film promotion, actors Vidya Balan, Tusshar Kapoor and Emraan Hashmi made appearances on the popular TV show Bigg Boss aired on Colors on 26 November 2011. Balan also entered the house to spend some time with the housemates and present a red sari to Sunny Leone, as a present. On 27 November 2011, Balan and Hashmi made guest appearances on a special episode of the TV series Bade Achhe Lagte Hain. Balan shook leg to the song, "Ooh La La" with Saakshi Tanwar, the female lead actress of the show.

== Music ==
T-Series acquired the music rights for The Dirty Picture. Vishal–Shekhar composed four tracks and Rajat Arora penned the lyrics for them. The first of the four tracks, "Ooh La La," sung by Shreya Ghoshal and Bappi Lahiri was released on the internet on 4 November 2011, along with the soundtrack. "Ooh La La" was featured in Fox American sitcom television series New Girl episode "Big Mama P". and was used in some regional films, including in Race Gurram. The Tamil song "Nakka Mukka" was featured in the film.

== Release ==
The film released worldwide on 2 December 2011, coinciding with the 51st birth anniversary of South Indian film siren Silk Smitha. Nationally, the film released on 1766 screens and on 120 screens abroad. The satellite rights were sold to SET for ₹80 million (US$850,000) and another ₹20 million (US$210,000) from music rights deal with T-Series. Raveena Tandon's husband, Anil Thadani acquired the distributor rights for ₹191 million (US$2.0 million).

It was initially banned by the Pakistan Central Board of Film Censors due to concerns over obscenity, though it was later cleared for release only a week after the Indian premiere.

== Reception ==
=== Critical response ===
Upon release, the film received positive reviews from critics, with Balan's performance receiving widespread critical acclaim. The Times of India gave 4 out of 5 stars, concluding that "The Dirty Picture is definitely not only your film for the week, but is a seminal work that will be studied in feminist discourses." Kaveree Bamzai of India Today gave 4 out of 5 stars and extolled Balan's performance, calling it "riveting". Rajeev Masand of CNN-IBN gave 3 stars out of 5, commenting "Despite the film’s shortcomings, you go the distance for Vidya Balan, who’s riveting as Silk. She plays the part with gusto – it’s a rare performance, one that’s this brave and uninhibited. Vidya pushes the envelope in the way she bares herself both physically and emotionally...Vidya’s lack of vanity and complete surrender to her craft reinforces why she’s miles ahead of her contemporaries."

Dainik Bhaskar gave the film 3 1/2 stars out of 5, concluding, "Overall, a big thumbs up to The Dirty Picture, which is in its truest meaning, an entertainer. Highly recommended!" Raja Sen from Rediff.com gave 3.5 out of 5 stars and said "The Dirty Picture forsakes much potential nuance in its urge to please crowds but is still far more engaging than most Bollywood produce." Sukanya Verma of Rediff.com gave 3 out of 5 stars, highlighting that "In terms of creativity, it's a middling effort. But where bravado is concerned, The Dirty Picture kicks ass by virtue of three very strong reasons: Vidya Balan. Vidya Balan. Vidya Balan." Kunal Guha of Yahoo! India gave the movie 3 stars out of 5, and said, "Clearly, Rajat Aroraa's winning dialogues will make you sit up and say, "She [Balan] didn't just say that?!" Sudhish Kamath of The Hindu praised Balan's performance saying "This is the single-most boldest performance by a woman in the history of Indian cinema...Vidya apparently put on 12 kilos for this film and they all show. It needs some amount of guts and sass to pull it off and she sizzles in this role tailor-made to show off her acting chops."

=== Box office ===
The Dirty Picture opened strong, with 60–65% collections on average at multiplexes and had the 5th biggest opening of 2011. The opening was best in and around the Maharashtra area, with 80% and 75% openings respectively. The film was declared a 'Blockbuster' by Box Office India after its fourth week and ended with a lifetime gross of around ₹850 million (US$9.1 million).

==== India ====
On the first day, the Hindi version grossed around ₹88.5 million (US$950,000) nett, while the Telugu version collected around ₹2 million (US$21,000). The film grossed ₹107.8 million (US$1.2 million) nett on Saturday and ₹123.8 million (US$1.3 million) nett on Sunday, taking the first weekend nett collection at ₹322.5 million (US$3.4 million) from all versions (Hindi, Tamil, Telugu). The Dirty Picture sustained well on Monday by collecting ₹50 million (US$530,000) nett, with total collection netting at ₹342.5 million (US$3.7 million). Due to a public holiday on Tuesday owing to Muharram celebrations, collection jumped to ₹57.5 million (US$610,000) nett, and hence taking the total 5 days collection to ₹400 million (US$4.3 million) nett. By the end of the first week, it netted around ₹500 million (US$5.3 million) and in the process became the biggest opening ever for a women-oriented film in the history of Indian Cinema.

The Dirty Picture sustained well in the second week. The film grossed ₹25 million (US$270,000) nett on its second Friday while ₹40 million (US$430,000) nett on Saturday, with major collections coming from Maharashtra area. It collected ₹115 million (US$1.2 million) nett on its second weekend. 25 weeks after its release, The Dirty Picture continued to have a successful run in theaters; the film celebrated its silver jubilee at Relief Cinema in Ahmedabad, Gujarat. The film grossed around ₹850 million (US$9.1 million) in India with its Hindi version grossing ₹797.6 million (US$8.5 million) domestic nett. The Dirty Picture was highest grossing Bollywood film with an 'A' (Adults only) certificate in India, before the record was broken by Grand Masti in 2013.

==== Other territories ====
Internationally, the film released in the UAE, UK, Canada, United States, Mauritius, Malaysia, Singapore, Kenya, Tanzania, Indonesia, South Africa, Australia, New Zealand, Fiji and Hong Kong. Its nett opening altogether in these territories was approximately ₹35 million (US$370,000). In UAE, on Thursday alone, the film grossed ₹4.3 million (US$46,000).

== Home media ==
The Indian television premiere of The Dirty Picture was set to be telecast on SET on 22 April 2012 at 12 pm and 8 pm IST. The Nagpur bench of the Bombay High Court allowed the TV channel to go ahead with the scheduled telecast after the Central Board of Film Certification had cleared the film with 56 cuts, 36 of which were done by the producers, while other cuts were suggested by the Certification Board. It had to go through these cuts as the telecast of an adult-rated film during prime time in India is a violation of the Cable TV Network Rules, 1994 and the Cable TV Networks (Regulation) Act, 1995. Following this process, Sony Entertainment Television promoted the scheduled telecast. However, on the scheduled day, the film was not telecast, with the channel putting up a message stating, "For unavoidable reasons we regret to inform you that The Dirty Picture will not be telecast today. Any inconvenience caused is deeply regretted." The Information and Broadcast Ministry informed the TV channel that it can air the film only after prime time: post 11 pm.

== Accolades ==
The Dirty Picture received numerous awards and nominations from major award shows in India and abroad. The majority of these were won by Vidya Balan in the Best Actress category for her performance. The other achievements include those of costume design, dialogue, make-up, playback singing and choreography.
