= List of accolades received by Zindagi Na Milegi Dobara =

Accolades
Award	Won	Nominated
Asian Film Awards	0	3
BIG Star Entertainment Awards	1	1
Filmfare Awards	7	13
International Indian Film Academy Awards	9	14
Mirchi Music Awards	2	8
National Film Awards	2	2
Screen Awards	3	11
Star Guild Awards	6	8
Stardust Awards	1	6
Zee Cine Awards	4	8
- Total number of awards and nominations^{[1]}
Totals	35	74
- References

Zindagi Na Milegi Dobara (English: You Live Only Once) is a 2011 Indian coming-of-age film directed by Zoya Akhtar, who also co-wrote the film along with Reema Kagti. It is produced by Excel Entertainment. The film stars an ensemble cast of Hrithik Roshan, Abhay Deol and Farhan Akhtar, with Katrina Kaif and Kalki Koechlin in supporting roles. The musical score for the film was composed by the trio Shankar–Ehsaan–Loy. Its cinematography was provided by Carlos Catalan. The film narrates the story of three friends on a bachelor trip and how each of them discover themselves and overcome their problems and insecurities.

Made on a budget of ₹550 million (US$5.8 million), Zindagi Na Milegi Dobara was released on 5 July 2011 and grossed over ₹1.53 billion (US$16 million) worldwide. Rotten Tomatoes, a review aggregator, surveyed 7 reviews and judged 100 percent to be positive. The film garnered awards and nominations in several categories, with particular praise for its direction, screenplay, and the performances of its cast. As of 2015, the film has won 33 awards from 66 nominations.

At the 57th ceremony of the Filmfare Awards, Zindagi Na Milegi Dobara won awards in seven categories, including Best Film, Best Director (Zoya Akhtar), and Best Supporting Actor (Farhan Akhtar). The film garnered eleven nominations at the 18th Screen Awards ceremony, and received three awards, including Best Film. At the 13th Zee Cine Awards, it received four awards, including Best Supporting Actor. In the 13th iteration of the International Indian Film Academy Awards, the film was nominated for fourteen awards, going on to win nine, including Best Film, Best Director, and Best Supporting Actor. The film won two honours—Best Choreography and a Best Audiography prize for Baylon Fonseca—at the 59th ceremony of India's National Film Awards.

== Accolades ==
Award	Date of ceremony^{[2]}	Category	Recipient(s) and nominee(s)	Result	Ref(s)
Asian Film Awards	19 March 2012	Best Film	Zindagi Na Milegi Dobara	Nominated	
Asian Film Awards	19 March 2012	Best Production Design	Suzanne Caplan Merwanji	Nominated	
Asian Film Awards	19 March 2012	Best Editor	Anand Subaya	Nominated	
BIG Star Entertainment Awards	18 December 2011	Most Entertaining Actor in a Comic Role	Farhan Akhtar	Won	
Filmfare Awards	29 January 2012	Best Film	Zindagi Na Milegi Dobara	Won	
Filmfare Awards	29 January 2012	Best Film (Critics)	Zindagi Na Milegi Dobara	Won	
Filmfare Awards	29 January 2012	Best Director	Zoya Akhtar	Won	
Filmfare Awards	29 January 2012	Best Actor	Hrithik Roshan	Nominated	
Filmfare Awards	29 January 2012	Best Supporting Actor	Abhay Deol	Nominated	
Filmfare Awards	29 January 2012	Best Supporting Actor	Farhan Akhtar	Won	
Filmfare Awards	29 January 2012	Best Supporting Actress	Kalki Koechlin	Nominated	
Filmfare Awards	29 January 2012	Best Music Director	Shankar–Ehsaan–Loy	Nominated	
Filmfare Awards	29 January 2012	Best Lyricist	Javed Akhtar for "Señorita"	Nominated	
Filmfare Awards	29 January 2012	Best Female Playback Singer	Alyssa Mendonsa for "Khwabon Ke Parindey"	Nominated	
Filmfare Awards	29 January 2012	Best Dialogue	Farhan Akhtar	Won	
Filmfare Awards	29 January 2012	Best Cinematographer	Carlos Catalan	Won	
Filmfare Awards	29 January 2012	Best Choreography	Bosco-Caesar for "Senorita"	Won	
International Indian Film Academy Awards	9 June 2012	Best Film	Zindagi Na Milegi Dobara	Won	
International Indian Film Academy Awards	9 June 2012	Best Director	Zoya Akhtar	Won	
International Indian Film Academy Awards	9 June 2012	Best Actor	Hrithik Roshan	Nominated	
International Indian Film Academy Awards	9 June 2012	Best Supporting Actor	Abhay Deol	Nominated	
International Indian Film Academy Awards	9 June 2012	Best Supporting Actor	Farhan Akhtar	Won	
International Indian Film Academy Awards	9 June 2012	Best Supporting Actress	Kalki Koechlin	Nominated	
International Indian Film Academy Awards	9 June 2012	Best Music Director	Shankar–Ehsaan–Loy	Nominated	
International Indian Film Academy Awards	9 June 2012	Best Lyricist	Javed Akhtar for "Khwabon Ke Parindey"	Nominated	
International Indian Film Academy Awards	9 June 2012	Best Story	Reema Kagti	Won	
International Indian Film Academy Awards	9 June 2012	Best Cinematography	Carlos Catalan	Won	
International Indian Film Academy Awards	9 June 2012	Best Screenplay	Zoya Akhtar, Reema Kagti	Won	
International Indian Film Academy Awards	9 June 2012	Best Editing	Anand Subaya	Won	
International Indian Film Academy Awards	9 June 2012	Best Choreography	Bosco-Caesar	Won	
International Indian Film Academy Awards	9 June 2012	Best Sound Re-Recording	Baylon Fonseca, Anuj Mathur	Won	
Mirchi Music Awards	21 March 2012	Song of The Year	"Senorita"	Won	
Mirchi Music Awards	21 March 2012	Album of The Year	Shankar–Ehsaan–Loy, Javed Akhtar	Nominated	
Mirchi Music Awards	21 March 2012	Music Composer of The Year	Shankar–Ehsaan–Loy for "Senorita"	Nominated	
Mirchi Music Awards	21 March 2012	Lyricist of The Year	Javed Akhtar for "Khwabon Ke Parindey"	Won	
Mirchi Music Awards	21 March 2012	Lyricist of The Year	Javed Akhtar for "Senorita"	Nominated	
Mirchi Music Awards	21 March 2012	Upcoming Male Vocalist of The Year	Hrithik Roshan & Abhay Deol for "Senorita"	Nominated	
Mirchi Music Awards	21 March 2012	Best Song Recording	"Ik Junoon"	Nominated	
Mirchi Music Awards	21 March 2012	Best Background Score of the Year	Shankar–Ehsaan–Loy	Nominated	
National Film Awards	3 May 2012	Best Choreography	Bosco-Caesar	Won	
National Film Awards	3 May 2012	Best Audiography	Baylon Fonseca	Won	
Screen Awards	14 January 2012	Best Film	Zindagi Na Milegi Dobara	Won	
Screen Awards	14 January 2012	Best Director	Zoya Akhtar	Nominated	
Screen Awards	14 January 2012	Best Ensemble Cast	Hrithik Roshan, Farhan Akhtar, Abhay Deol, Katrina Kaif, Kalki Koechlin	Nominated	
Screen Awards	14 January 2012	Best Female Playback Singer	Alyssa Mendonsa for "Khwabon Ke Parindey"	Nominated	
Screen Awards	14 January 2012	Best Dialogue	Farhan Akhtar, Javed Akhtar	Won	
Screen Awards	14 January 2012	Best Choreography	Bosco-Caesar for "Señorita"	Won	
Screen Awards	14 January 2012	Best Background Music	Shankar–Ehsaan–Loy	Nominated	
Screen Awards	14 January 2012	Best Screenplay	Zoya Akhtar, Reema Kagti	Nominated	
Screen Awards	14 January 2012	Best Editing	Anand Subaya	Nominated	
Screen Awards	14 January 2012	Best Cinematography	Carlos Catalan	Nominated	
Screen Awards	14 January 2012	Best Sound Design	Baylon Fonseca	Nominated	
Star Guild Awards	20 January 2012	Best Film	Zindagi Na Milegi Dobara	Won	
Star Guild Awards	20 January 2012	Best Director	Zoya Akhtar	Won	
Star Guild Awards	20 January 2012	Best Actor in a Supporting Role	Farhan Akhtar	Won	
Star Guild Awards	20 January 2012	Best Story	Zoya Akhtar, Reema Kagti	Won	
Star Guild Awards	20 January 2012	Best Screenplay	Zoya Akhtar	Won	
Star Guild Awards	20 January 2012	Best Choreography	Bosco-Caesar for "Señorita"	Won	
Star Guild Awards	20 January 2012	Best Dialogue	Farhan Akhtar	Nominated	
Star Guild Awards	20 January 2012	Best Lyricist	Javed Akhtar for "Señorita"	Nominated	
Stardust Awards	25 February 2012	Film of the Year	Zindagi Na Milegi Dobara	Nominated	
Stardust Awards	25 February 2012	Dream Director	Zoya Akhtar	Nominated	
Stardust Awards	25 February 2012	Star of the Year — Male	Hrithik Roshan	Nominated	
Stardust Awards	25 February 2012	Best Drama Actor	Hrithik Roshan	Won	
Stardust Awards	25 February 2012	Star of the Year — Female	Katrina Kaif (also for Mere Brother Ki Dulhan)	Nominated	
Stardust Awards	25 February 2012	Best Drama Actress	Katrina Kaif	Nominated	
Zee Cine Awards	22 January 2012	Best Film	Zindagi Na Milegi Dobara	Won	
Zee Cine Awards	22 January 2012	Best Director	Zoya Akhtar	Nominated	
Zee Cine Awards	22 January 2012	Best Actor	Hrithik Roshan	Nominated	
Zee Cine Awards	22 January 2012	Best Actress	Katrina Kaif	Nominated	
Zee Cine Awards	22 January 2012	Best Supporting Actor	Farhan Akhtar	Won	
Zee Cine Awards	22 January 2012	Best Track of the Year	"Señorita"	Nominated	
Zee Cine Awards	22 January 2012	Best Story	Zoya Akhtar, Reema Kagti	Won	
Zee Cine Awards	22 January 2012	Best Cinematography	Carlos Catalan	Won	

== See also ==
- List of Bollywood films of 2011

== Footnotes ==
^{^[1]} Awards in certain categories do not have prior nominations and only winners are announced by the jury. For simplification and to avoid errors, each award in this list has been presumed to have had a prior nomination.
^{^[2]} Each date is linked to the article about the awards held that year, wherever possible.
