= List of awards and nominations received by Farhan Akhtar =

Farhan Akhtar awards and nominations
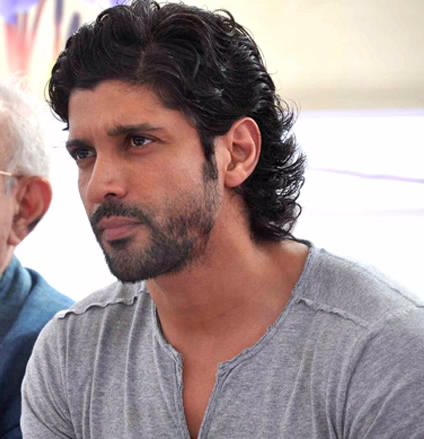
- Akhtar in 2012
Awards and nominations
Award	Wins	Nominations
National Film Awards	2	0
Filmfare Awards	8	6
IIFA Awards	6	5
Stardust Awards	1	3
Screen Awards	3	3
Producers Guild Film Awards	3	3
Asian Film Awards	0	1
Zee Cine Awards	3	4
BIG Star Entertainment Awards	1	0
Mirchi Music Awards	1	0
Other awards	4	1

Totals (Note: Certain award groups do not simply award one winner. They acknowledge several different recipients, have runners-up, and have third place. Since this is a specific recognition and is different from losing an award, runner-up mentions are considered wins in this award tally. For simplification and to avoid errors, each award in this list has been presumed to have had a prior nomination.)
- Wins: 32
- Nominations: 26

Farhan Akhtar (born 9 January 1974) is an Indian film director, screenwriter, producer, actor, playback singer and television host. Born in Mumbai to screenwriters Javed Akhtar and Honey Irani, he grew up under the influence of the Hindi film industry. He began his career in Bollywood by working as an assistant director in Lamhe (1991) and Himalay Putra (1997).

Akhtar, after establishing a production company named Excel Entertainment along with Ritesh Sidhwani, made his directorial debut with the coming-of-age comedy-drama Dil Chahta Hai (2001) and received widespread critical acclaim for portraying the modern Indian youth. The film also won the National Film Award for Best Feature Film in Hindi. Following it, he directed the war film Lakshya (2004) and had his Hollywood debut through the soundtrack of Bride and Prejudice (2004), for which he wrote the lyrics. He went on to make the commercially successful Don (2006). He directed a short film titled Positive (2007), to spread awareness on HIV-AIDS.

Although he initially started his acting career with The Fakir of Venice, his official debut was with Rock On!! (2008), for which he won a second National Film Award for Best Feature Film in Hindi as producer, and indulged in further experimentation before he wrote the dialogues, produced and acted for the critical and commercial success Zindagi Na Milegi Dobara (2011), which won him four Filmfare Awards, including Best Supporting Actor. In the same year, he directed a sequel to Don titled Don 2 (2011), which remains his highest-grossing film to date. He achieved further success by portraying Milkha Singh in the 2013 biopic Bhaag Milkha Bhaag, earning him the Filmfare Award for Best Actor. In 2016, he received praise for starring in the crime thriller Wazir and the ensemble family comedy-drama Dil Dhadakne Do.

== Awards and nominations ==
Year	Film	Award	Category	Result	Ref.
2002	Kya Kehna	IIFA Awards	Best Screenplay	Won	
2002	Dil Chahta Hai	National Film Awards	Best Feature Film in Hindi	Won	
2002	Dil Chahta Hai	Filmfare Awards	Best Film (Critics)	Won	
2002	Dil Chahta Hai	Filmfare Awards	Best Screenplay	Won	
2002	Dil Chahta Hai	Filmfare Awards	Best Film	Nominated	
2002	Dil Chahta Hai	Filmfare Awards	Best Director	Nominated	
2002	Dil Chahta Hai	International Indian Film Academy Awards	Best Story	Nominated	
2002	Dil Chahta Hai	International Indian Film Academy Awards	Best Director	Nominated	
2002	Dil Chahta Hai	International Indian Film Academy Awards	Best Screenplay	Won	
2002	Dil Chahta Hai	Screen Awards	Best Dialogue	Won	
2002	Dil Chahta Hai	Screen Awards	Best Director	Nominated	
2002	Dil Chahta Hai	Screen Awards	Best Screenplay	Nominated	
2002	Dil Chahta Hai	Zee Cine Awards	Best Debut Director	Nominated	
2002	Dil Chahta Hai	Zee Cine Awards	Best Story	Won	
2005	Lakshya	Zee Cine Awards	Best Director	Nominated	
2005	Lakshya	Filmfare Awards	Best Director	Nominated	
2005	Lakshya	Screen Awards	Best Director	Nominated	
2007	Don	Neuchatel International Fantastic Film Festival	Best Asian Film	Won	
2009	Rock On!!	National Film Awards	Best Feature Film in Hindi	Won	
2009	Rock On!!	Filmfare Awards	Best Male Debut	Won	
2009	Rock On!!	Filmfare Awards	Best Male Playback Singer for "Socha Hai"	Nominated	
2009	Rock On!!	International Indian Film Academy Awards	Best Film	Nominated	
2009	Rock On!!	International Indian Film Academy Awards	Best Male Playback Singer for "Socha Hai"	Nominated	
2009	Rock On!!	International Indian Film Academy Awards	Star Debut of the Year – Male	Won	
2009	Rock On!!	Stardust Awards	Superstar of Tomorrow – Male	Won	
2009	Rock On!!	Screen Awards	Most Promising Newcomer – Male	Won	
2009	Rock On!!	Producers Guild Film Awards	Best Film	Nominated	
2010	Luck By Chance	Producers Guild Film Awards	Best Film	Nominated	
2010	Luck By Chance	Stardust Awards	Superstar of Tomorrow – Male	Nominated	
2011	Karthik Calling Karthik	Stardust Awards	Best Thriller/Action Film	Nominated	
2011	Karthik Calling Karthik	Stardust Awards	Best Actor in a Thriller/Action	Nominated	
2012	Zindagi Na Milegi Dobara	Filmfare Awards	Best Film	Won	
2012	Zindagi Na Milegi Dobara	Filmfare Awards	Best Film (Critics)	Won	
2012	Zindagi Na Milegi Dobara	Filmfare Awards	Best Supporting Actor	Won	
2012	Zindagi Na Milegi Dobara	Filmfare Awards	Best Dialogue	Won	
2012	Zindagi Na Milegi Dobara	Screen Awards	Best Dialogue	Won	
2012	Zindagi Na Milegi Dobara	Screen Awards	Best Ensemble Cast (along with Hrithik Roshan, Abhay Deol, Katrina Kaif and Kalki Koechlin)	Nominated	
2012	Zindagi Na Milegi Dobara	Asian Film Awards	Best Film	Nominated	
2012	Zindagi Na Milegi Dobara	Zee Cine Awards	Best Supporting Actor	Won	
2012	Zindagi Na Milegi Dobara	International Indian Film Academy Awards	Best Supporting Actor	Won	
2012	Zindagi Na Milegi Dobara	Producers Guild Film Awards	Best Film	Won	
2012	Zindagi Na Milegi Dobara	Producers Guild Film Awards	Best Supporting Actor	Won	
2012	Zindagi Na Milegi Dobara	Producers Guild Film Awards	Best Dialogue	Nominated	
2012	Zindagi Na Milegi Dobara	International Indian Film Academy Awards	Best Film	Won	
2012	Zindagi Na Milegi Dobara	International Indian Film Academy Awards	Best Supporting Actor	Won	
2012	Don 2	Filmfare Awards	Best Film	Nominated	
2012	Don 2	Filmfare Awards	Best Director	Nominated	
2012	Don 2	Zee Cine Awards	Best Film	Nominated	
2012	Don 2	Zee Cine Awards	Best Director	Nominated	
2012	Don 2	Stardust Awards	Film of the Year	Nominated	
2012	Don 2	Stardust Awards	Dream Director	Nominated	
2012	—N/a	Vogue Beauty Awards	Most Beautiful Man	Won	
2014	Bhaag Milkha Bhaag	Screen Awards	Best Actor	Won	
2014	Bhaag Milkha Bhaag	Producers Guild Film Awards	Best Actor	Won	
2014	Bhaag Milkha Bhaag	Filmfare Awards	Best Actor	Won	
2014	Bhaag Milkha Bhaag	International Indian Film Academy Awards	Best Actor	Won	
2014	Bhaag Milkha Bhaag	Zee Cine Awards	Best Actor (Male) - Jury	Won	
2014	Bhaag Milkha Bhaag	BIG Star Entertainment Awards	Most Entertaining Actor - Male	Won	
2014	Bhaag Milkha Bhaag	GQ Men of the Year Award	Actor of the Year	Won	
2014	Bhaag Milkha Bhaag	IBNLive Movie Awards	Best Actor	Won	
2014	Bhaag Milkha Bhaag	CNN-IBN Indian of the Year	Entertainer of the Year	Nominated	
2014	—N/a	Mirchi Music Awards	Special Award	Nominated	
2016	Dil Dhadakne Do	Producers Guild Film Awards	Best Supporting Actor	Nominated	
2016	Dil Dhadakne Do	IIFA Awards	Best Supporting Actor	Nominated	
2019	The Sky Is Pink⁣	Screen Awards⁣⁣	Best Actor (Critics)	Nominated⁣	
2022	Toofaan	Nickelodeon Kids' Choice Awards India	Favourite Film	Nominated	

== See also ==
- List of accolades received by Zindagi Na Milegi Dobara
- List of accolades received by Dil Dhadakne Do
