= Zindagi Na Milegi Dobara (soundtrack) =

- Original CD Cover

Soundtrack album by Shankar–Ehsaan–Loy
- Released: 17 June 2011
- Recorded: 2010
- Genre: Film soundtrack
- Length: 36:27
- Language: Hindi
- Label: T-Series
- Producer: Shankar–Ehsaan–Loy

Shankar–Ehsaan–Loy chronology
Zokkomon (2011)	Zindagi Na Milegi Dobara (2011)	Aarakshan (2011)

Singles from Zindagi Na Milegi Dobara
- 1. "Ik Junoon (Paint It Red)" Released: 17 June 2011; 2. "Señorita" Released: 17 June 2011; 3. "Dil Dhadakne Do" Released: 6 July 2011

Zindagi Na Milegi Dobara is the soundtrack album to Zoya Akhtar's 2011 Hindi film of the same name starring Hrithik Roshan, Abhay Deol and Farhan Akhtar. The film has seven songs and two remixes composed by Shankar–Ehsaan–Loy with lyrics by Javed Akhtar. The album marks the second collaboration of the trio with Zoya Akhtar. The music was released on 17 June 2011 by T-Series.

== Overview ==
This is second time the trio has worked for Zoya Akhtar and their sixth film with Excel Entertainment. The album features seven tracks and two remixes.

"Dil Dhadakne Do" is a "zingy" rock track with "punchy beat" and guitar chords backed by the vocals of Suraj Jagan, Shankar Mahadevan and Joi Barua. "Ik Junoon (Paint It Red)", the song featuring the La Tomatina festival of Spain, is an Ambient song with an electropop twist. "Khwabon Ke Parindey" by Mohit Chauhan and Alyssa Mendonsa is a "happy, nosedived-into-love kind" of song with Brazilian bossa nova track with Latin style drumming to it. The song "Señorita" sung by the leads — Farhan Akhtar, Hrithik Roshan, Abhay Deol — marks the film debut of Spanish flamenco singer Maria del Mar Fernández. "Der Lagi Lekin" is a pathos song rendered by Shankar Mahadevan and "Sooraj Ki Baahon Mein" is a retro-pop track by Loy Mendonsa, Dominique Cerejo and Clinton Cerejo. The final song of the soundtrack is a monologue "Toh Zinda Ho Tum" by Farhan Akhtar with poetry of Javed Akhtar accompanied by soft acoustic tunes and cello.

The album had featured in Bollywood Hungama's "10 Albums to watch out for in 2011" list.

== Track listing ==
No.	Title	Singer(s)	Length
1.	"Dil Dhadakne Do"	Shankar Mahadevan, Suraj Jagan, Joi Barua	3:51
2.	"Ik Junoon (Paint It Red)"	Vishal Dadlani, Alyssa Mendonsa, Gulraj Singh	5:00
3.	"Khaabon Ke Parindey"	Alyssa Mendonsa, Mohit Chauhan	4:13
4.	"Señorita"	Farhan Akhtar, Hrithik Roshan, Abhay Deol, Maria del Mar Fernández, Carlyta Mouhini	3:51
5.	"Der Lagi Lekin"	Shankar Mahadevan	5:57
6.	"Sooraj Ki Baahon Mein"	Dominique Cerejo, Clinton Cerejo, Loy Mendonsa	3:25
7.	"Ik Junoon - (Remix)"	Vishal Dadlani, Alyssa Mendonsa, Gulraj Singh	4:04
8.	"Señorita – (Remix)"	Farhan Akhtar, Hrithik Roshan, Abhay Deol, Maria del Mar Fernández	4:23
Total length:			36:27

== Music Launch ==
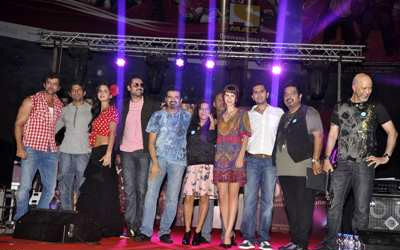
ZNMD cast and crew at the music launch

The audio was released on 17 June 2011 by T-Series. The music launch took place on later on 25 June at a suburban mall in Mumbai. The launch witnessed a live concert by the cast of the movie – Katrina Kaif, Hrithik Roshan, Farhan Akhtar, Abhay Deol and Kalki Koechlin. The function started with Shankar–Ehsaan–Loy performing Ik Junoon and was joined by Farhan Akhtar on the stage for Dil Dhadakne Do. Farhan Akhtar was accompanied by co-actors Hrithik Roshan and Abhay Deol for the track Señorita where Katrina Kaif shook a leg with in traditional Spanish costumes. Director Zoya Akhtar and producer Ritesh Sidhwani had also attended the launch.

== Reception ==
Professional ratings
Review scores
Source	Rating
Bollywood Hungama	3.5/5 stars
Rediff.com	3.5/5 stars
PlanetRadiocity	3.5/5 stars
Fever 104 FM	4/5 stars

The album received universal critical acclaim. Joginder Tuteja of Bollywood Hungama gave the album a positive review saying, "One of the best soundtracks of Shankar-Ehsaan-Loy and Javed Akhtar in recent times, Zindagi Na Milegi Dobara is a classy act that delivers just what it promised." Sukanya Verma of Rediff gave the album 3.5 stars out of five stars saying, "At a time when ostentatious is passed off as grand, it's refreshing to come across Zindagi Na Milegi Dobara's unaffected and chilled-out collection of melodies.". PlanetRadiocity, in their 3.5 star review, said, "Shankar-Ehsaan-Loy are usually consistent in the quality department and Zindagi Na Milegi Dobara is no exception. In these months of loud, gaudy and cheesy Bollywood nautanki songs, this one stands apart with its good manners and understated class."

The IANS review too was positive, which stated "When it's Shankar-Ehsaan-Loy, the expectations from the music score are usually high and like always, the trio has managed to fulfill what was required out of them in the upcoming film 'Zindagi Na Milegi Dobara'." Fever 104 FM, on the other hand, remarked, "The soundtrack of ZMND brings alive and back the old and quintessentially rocking S-E-L in the most promising way." BBC praised the album, calling it "a reflective and meaningful collection of songs that should stand the test of time."

== Charts ==
The soundtrack ranked at #1 in AVS Network's Top Ten Soundtracks of the week.

The album topped the Bollyspice Top 10 Music albums of 2011 list, which stated "Months later and this eclectic, evocative album is still stuck on repeat in our stereos. Shankar, Ehsaan and Loy, veterans of the business by now, show no signs of getting jaded or lacking in creativity."

The soundtrack was also included in Bollywood Hungama's Top 11 soundtracks of 2011, where Joginder Tuteja described the album as "pure, unadulterated and just the kind if fusion sound that ensured that Shankar-Ehsaan-Loy indeed had something fantastic to cheer about this year". NDTV Top 10 soundtracks of 2011 deemed the album as the fifth best album of the year.

Director Subhash Ghai voted the album as his favorite music album of the year.
