= 57th Filmfare Awards =

2012 awards for Hindi cinema

- Official poster of the event
- Date: 29 January 2012
- Site: Film City, Mumbai
- Hosted by: Shahrukh Khan; Ranbir Kapoor; Karan Johar; Ali Zafar; Ankita Shorey
- Official website: www.filmfare.com

Highlights
- Best Film: Zindagi Na Milegi Dobara
- Critics Award for Best Film: Zindagi Na Milegi Dobara
- Most awards: Zindagi Na Milegi Dobara (7)
- Most nominations: Zindagi Na Milegi Dobara (13)

Television coverage
- Network: Sony Entertainment Television (India)

The 57th Filmfare Awards were held on 29 January 2012 at Film City, Mumbai, honoring the best film of 2011 from the Hindi-language film industry (commonly known as Bollywood). The ceremony was jointly hosted by Shah Rukh Khan and Ranbir Kapoor. Both had hosted the award ceremonies previously but with different co-hosts (Khan with Saif Ali Khan, Kapoor with Imran Khan), hence making it the first time for this pair to host the show. The 57th Filmfare awards were televised on 19 February 2012 to the public.

The nominations for the awards were announced on 11 January 2012. Zindagi Na Milegi Dobara led the ceremony with 13 nominations, followed by Rockstar with 10 nominations, Delhi Belly with 7 nominations and The Dirty Picture with 6 nominations.

Zindagi Na Milegi Dobara won 7 awards, including Best Film, Best Film (Critics), Best Director (both for Zoya Akhtar) and Best Supporting Actor (for Farhan Akhtar), thus becoming the most-awarded film at the ceremony.

The 2012 awards thus equaled 2011 (Udaan) for the maximum number of awards won by a single film, and this also marked the largest award tally for a single film since 2007 (Omkara).

2012 also marked the first time after 2010 (3 Idiots) that the film with the most nominations also won the most awards.

Ranbir Kapoor won his first Best Actor award and second Best Actor (Critics) award for his role of Janardhan / Jordan in Rockstar, while Vidya Balan won her fourth Filmfare Award and second Best Actress award for her portrayal of Silk / Reshma in The Dirty Picture (in addition to a second Best Actress nomination at the same ceremony for her performance in No One Killed Jessica).

== Awards and nominees ==
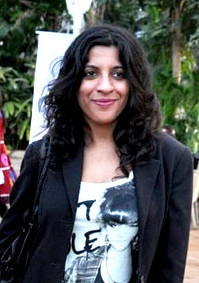
Zoya Akhtar, Best Director Critics & Popular

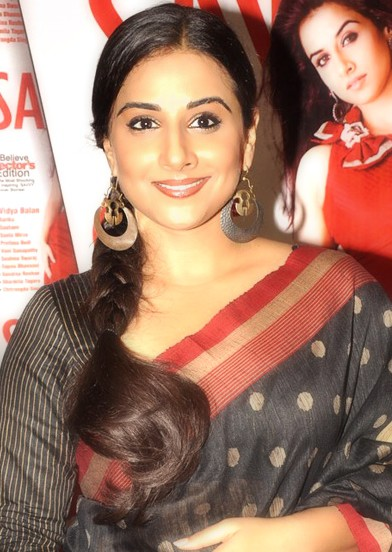
Vidya Balan, Best Actress

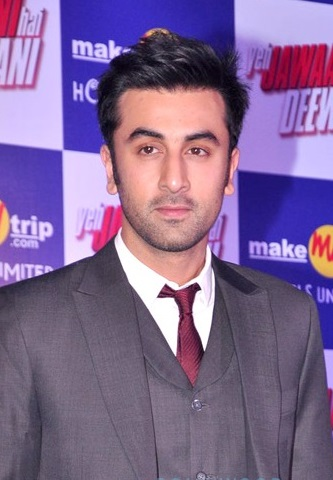
Ranbir Kapoor, Best Actor Critics & Popular

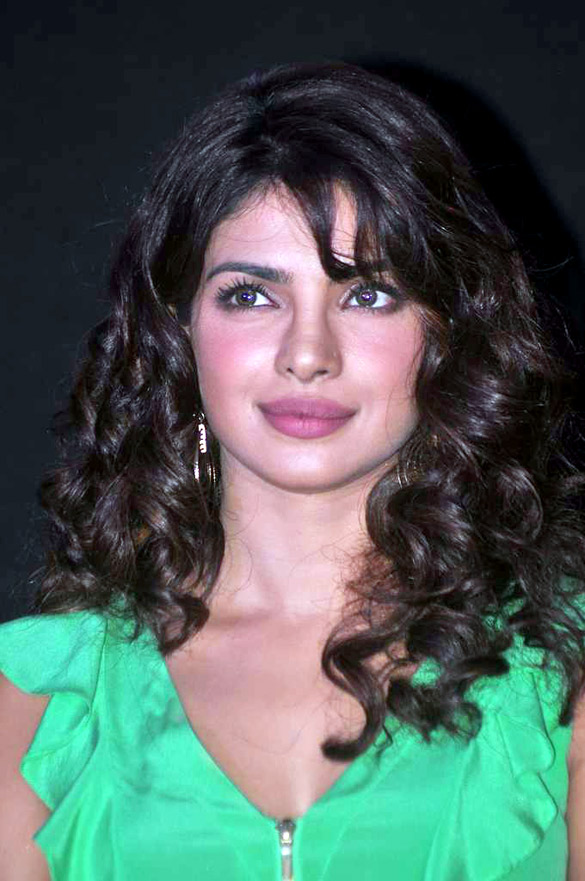
Priyanka Chopra, Best Actress Critics

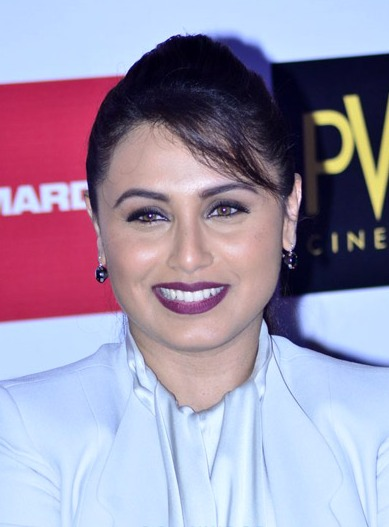
Rani Mukerji, Best Supporting Actress

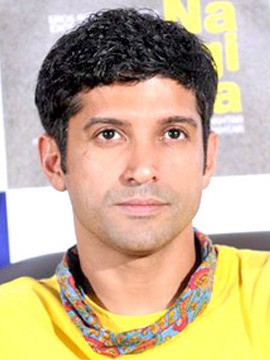
Farhan Akhtar, Best Supporting Actor

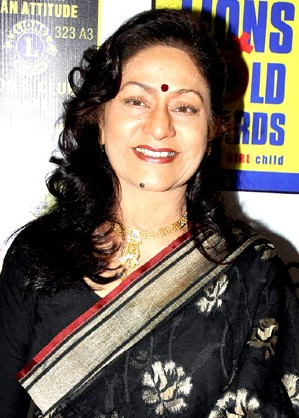
Aruna Irani, Lifetime Achievement Awardee

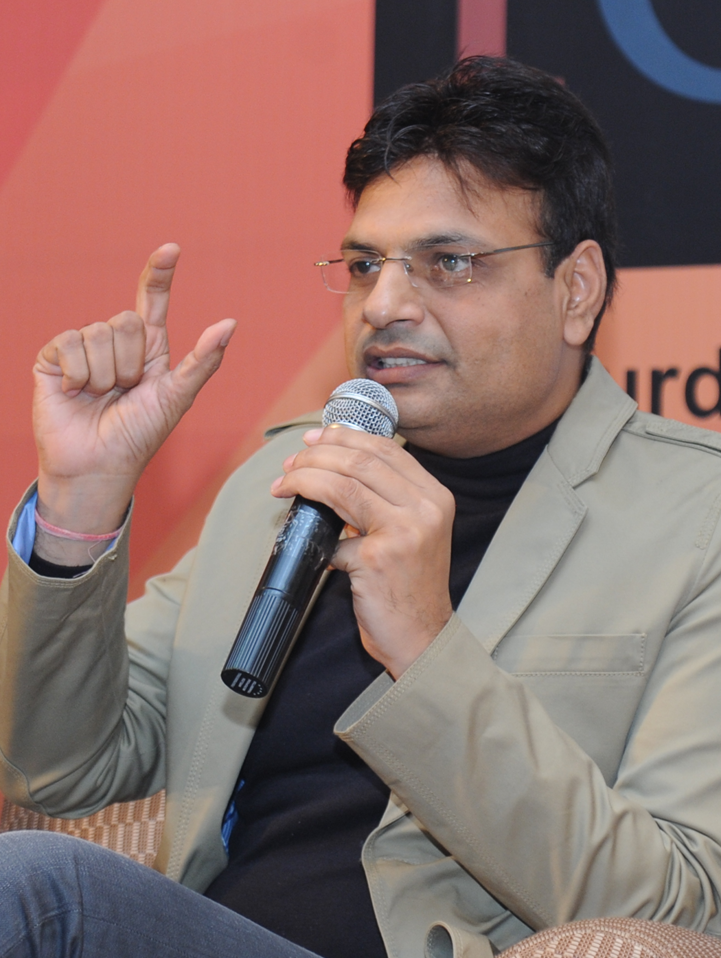
Irshad Kamil, Best Lyricist

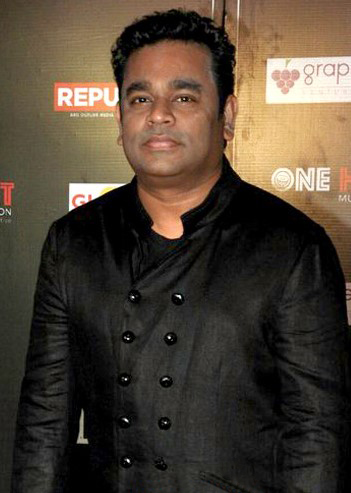
A. R. Rahman, Best Music Director

=== Main awards ===
Best Film	Best Director
Zindagi Na Milegi Dobara – Farhan Akhtar, Ritesh Sidhwani; Delhi Belly – Aamir Khan, Kiran Rao, Ronnie Screwvala; Don 2 – Farhan Akhtar, Ritesh Sidhwani, Shahrukh Khan; No One Killed Jessica – Ronnie Screwvala; Rockstar – Dhilin Mehta; The Dirty Picture – Ekta Kapoor, Shobha Kapoor	Zoya Akhtar – Zindagi Na Milegi Dobara; Abhinay Deo – Delhi Belly; Farhan Akhtar – Don 2; Imtiaz Ali – Rockstar; Milan Luthria – The Dirty Picture; Raj Kumar Gupta – No One Killed Jessica
Best Actor	Best Actress
Ranbir Kapoor – Rockstar as Janardhan "Jordan" Jakhar; Ajay Devgn – Singham as Bajirao Singham; Amitabh Bachchan – Aarakshan as Prabhakar Anand; Hrithik Roshan – Zindagi Na Milegi Dobara as Arjun; Salman Khan – Bodyguard as Lovely Singh; Shah Rukh Khan – Don 2 as Don	Vidya Balan – The Dirty Picture as Reshma / Silk Smitha; Katrina Kaif – Mere Brother Ki Dulhan as Dimple Dixit; Mahie Gill – Saheb, Biwi Aur Gangster as Madhavi; Priyanka Chopra – 7 Khoon Maaf as Susanna Anna-Marie Johannes; Vidya Balan – No One Killed Jessica as Sabrina Lal
Best Supporting Actor	Best Supporting Actress
Farhan Akhtar – Zindagi Na Milegi Dobara as Imran Qureshi; Abhay Deol – Zindagi Na Milegi Dobara as Kabir Dewan; Naseeruddin Shah – The Dirty Picture as Suryakanth; Pitobash Tripathy – Shor in the City as Mandook; Vir Das – Delhi Belly as Arup	Rani Mukerji – No One Killed Jessica as Meera Gaity; Juhi Chawla – I Am as Megha; Kalki Koechlin – Zindagi Na Milegi Dobara as Natasha Arora; Parineeti Chopra – Ladies vs Ricky Bahl as Dimple Chaddha; Swara Bhaskar – Tanu Weds Manu as Payal Jassi Gill
Best Male Debut	Best Female Debut
Vidyut Jamwal – Force; Gulshan Devaiah – Dum Maaro Dum, Shaitan, That Girl in Yellow Boots; Partho Gupte – Stanley Ka Dabba; Rana Daggubati – Dum Maaro Dum; Shiv Panditt – Shaitan	Parineeti Chopra – Ladies vs Ricky Bahl; Kajal Aggarwal – Singham; Kriti Malhotra – Dhobi Ghat; Monica Dogra – Dhobi Ghat; Myra – No One Killed Jessica; Nargis Fakhri – Rockstar
Best Music Director	Best Lyricist
A. R. Rahman – Rockstar; Ram Sampath – Delhi Belly; Shankar–Ehsaan–Loy – Zindagi Na Milegi Dobara; Sohail Sen – Mere Brother Ki Dulhan; Vishal–Shekhar – Ra.One	Irshad Kamil – "Nadaan Parindey" from Rockstar; Gulzar – "Darling" from 7 Khoon Maaf; Irshad Kamil – "Sadda Haq" from Rockstar; Javed Akhtar – "Senorita" from Zindagi Na Milegi Dobara; Vishal Dadlani and Niranjan Iyengar – "Chammak Challo" from Ra.One
Best Playback Singer – Male	Best Playback Singer – Female
Mohit Chauhan – "Jo Bhi Main" from Rockstar; Akon and Vishal Dadlani – "Chammak Challo" from Ra.One; Mohit Chauhan – "Sadda Haq" from Rockstar; Rahat Fateh Ali Khan – "Teri Meri" from Bodyguard; Shafqat Amanat Ali – "Dildaara" from Ra.One	Rekha Bhardwaj and Usha Uthup – "Darling" from 7 Khoon Maaf; Alyssa Mendonsa – "Khwabon Ke Parindey" from Zindagi Na Milegi Dobara; Harshdeep Kaur – "Katiya Karu" from Rockstar; Shreya Ghoshal – "Teri Meri" from Bodyguard; Shreya Ghoshal – "Saibo" from Shor in the City

=== Critics' awards ===
Best Movie (Best Director)
Zindagi Na Milegi Dobara (Zoya Akhtar)
Best Actor	Best Actress
Ranbir Kapoor – Rockstar	Priyanka Chopra – 7 Khoon Maaf

=== Technical awards ===
Best Story	Best Screenplay
Sanjay Chauhan – I Am Kalam	Akshat Verma – Delhi Belly
Best Dialogue	Best Editing
Farhan Akhtar – Zindagi Na Milegi Dobara	Huzefa Lokhandwala – Delhi Belly
Best Choreography	Best Cinematography
Bosco-Caesar – "Senorita" from Zindagi Na Milegi Dobara	Carlos Catalan – Zindagi Na Milegi Dobara
Best Production Design	Best Sound Design
Shashank Tere – Delhi Belly	Nakul Kamte – Don 2
Best Costume Design	Best Background Score
Niharika Khan – The Dirty Picture	Ranjit Barot – Shaitan
Best Special Effects	Best Action
Red Chillies VFX – Ra.One	Matthias Barsch – Don 2

=== Special awards ===
Lifetime Achievement
- Aruna Irani
RD Burman Award
- Krsna for Tanu Weds Manu
Best Scene
- The Dirty Picture
Special Jury Award
- Partho Gupte for Stanley Ka Dabba

=== Multiple nominations and wins ===
The following films received multiple nominations.

- 13 nominations: Zindagi Na Milegi Dobara
- 10 nominations: Rockstar
- 7 nominations: Delhi Belly
- 6 nominations: The Dirty Picture
- 5 nominations: Don 2, No One Killed Jessica, Ra.One, Shaitan
- 4 nominations: 7 Khoon Maaf
- 3 nominations: Bodyguard

The following films received multiple awards.

- 7 wins: Zindagi Na Milegi Dobara
- 5 wins: Rockstar
- 3 wins: Delhi Belly, The Dirty Picture
- 2 wins: 7 Khoon Maaf, Don 2

== Partners ==
- Idea Cellular – Title Sponsor
- PC Jeweller – Associate Sponsor
- Sony Entertainment Television – Telecast Partner
- Black Dog – Beverage Partner
- Bright Outdoor Media – Outdoor partner
- Radio Mirchi – Radio Partner
- Big Cinemas – Multiplex Partner
