= Ik Junoon (Paint It Red) =

2011 song from the Indian film Zindagi Na Milegi Dobara

Song by Shankar–Ehsaan–Loy (composer) Vishal Dadlani, Alyssa Mendonsa, Gulraj Singh (singers)

from the album Zindagi Na Milegi Dobara (soundtrack)
- Released: 17 June 2011
- Recorded: 2010
- Genre: Filmi, Indian pop
- Label: T-Series
- Composer: Shankar–Ehsaan–Loy
- Lyricist: Javed Akhtar
- Producers: Farhan Akhtar; Ritesh Sidhwani

Audio sample
- Ik Junoon (Paint It Red): file; help

"Ik Junoon (Paint It Red)" (transl. A Passion) is a song by composer trio Shankar–Ehsaan–Loy for the film soundtrack of the film Zindagi Na Milegi Dobara (2011). The song was performed by Vishal Dadlani, Alyssa Mendonsa and Gulraj Singh while the lyrics was penned by Javed Akhtar.

== Background ==
Shankar–Ehsaan–Loy were asked to compose an Ambient house song by director Zoya Akhtar. They composed the song and gave it pop twist to it, so that it fits the situation well. The Vocoder was used for getting the robotic voice effect. The song is all about losing yourself in the moment. The promo of the songs was released on 11 June 2011.

== Music video ==
The La Tomatina festival of Spain was re-created for the shoot of the song. It was shot in Buñol, Valencia, Spain. Almost 16 tons of tomatoes were used for the shoot and they were flown in from Portugal. The import of tomatoes itself cost the producers about ₹ 1 crore. The song features Hrithik Roshan, Abhay Deol, Farhan Akhtar, Katrina Kaif and Ariadna Cabrol. The actors had to clean themselves up with hot water after every shot. They all were so sick of tomatoes after the shoot, that they couldn't eat any dish containing tomatoes for weeks.

== Reception ==
Bollywood Hungama described the song as, "full of 'masti', 'maza' and energy through visuals with the sound being totally subtle." The Rediff review remarked, "a sublime rhythm and minimalist ambience to work up a state of ecstasy which is irresistible".

== Chart performance ==
The song was an instant hit and rocked the music charts, as it entered the Radio Mirchi Top 20 list of the week at #1 and regained and maintained its #1 spot in third week, after dropping to #2 in the second week. The song made its entry in the PlanetBollywood.com charts at #6 and climbed two spots to #4 in one week. At the BBC Asian Charts, the song debuted at #40 and leaped to #7 in 6 weeks.

== Accolades ==
Award Ceremony	Category	Recipient	Result	Ref.(s)
4th Mirchi Music Awards	Best Song Recording	-	Nominated	

== See also ==
- Señorita
