= Oye! It's Friday! =

- Presented by: Farhan Akhtar
- Country of origin: India
- Original languages: Hindi; English
- No. of episodes: 15

Production
- Running time: 52 minutes
- Production company: Endemol India

Original release
- Network: NDTV Imagine
- Release: 12 December 2008 – 20 March 2009

Oye! It's Friday! is an Indian variety talk show on NDTV Imagine hosted by Farhan Akhtar. It featured a new celebrity every week on Friday. The show was made up of special performances by dancers and singers, jokes and light-hearted comedy.

== Guest stars ==
- Karan Johar
- Priyanka Chopra
- Aamir Khan
- Arjun Rampal
- Shilpa Shetty
- Shahrukh Khan
- Sonam Kapoor
- Ranbir Kapoor
- Sourav Ganguly
- Deepika Padukone
- Hrithik Roshan
- Abhishek Bachchan
- Mugdha Godse
- Katrina Kaif
- Shankar–Ehsaan–Loy
- Kangana Ranaut

== Performance Stars ==
- Amrita Arora
- Kailash Kher
- Monica Bedi
- Neha Dhupia
- Tanushree Dutta
- Hard Kaur
- Suzanne D'Mello
- Shamita Shetty
- Hussain Kuwajerwala
- Anoushka Shankar

== Reception ==
Sukanya Verma of Rediff.com gave the show 1 out of 5, writing, "Unlike the program it tries to model itself along the lines of -- Saturday Night Live or The Ellen DeGeneres Show, which are quite entertaining, imaginative, pleasantly insolent and most spontaneous, Oye! is dull, mundane, uninspired and perhaps a bigger disappointment than Don from Farhan Akhtar."
