= Alájar =

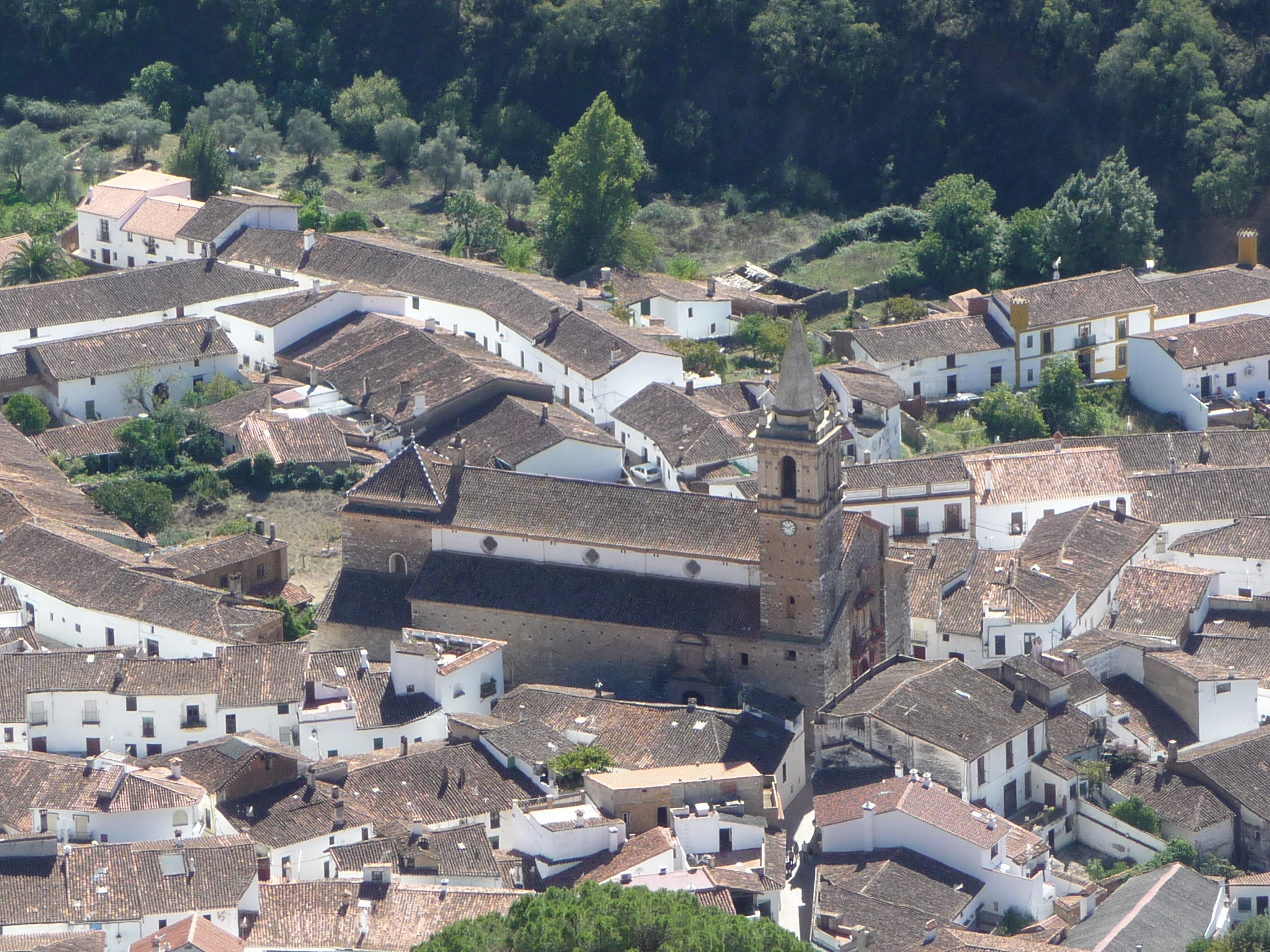

- Flag Coat of arms

- Location in Andalusia Location in Spain
- Coordinates: 37°52′N 6°39′W
- Country: Spain
- Autonomous community: Andalusia
- Province: Huelva
- Municipality: Alajar

Government
  - Mayor: Salvador Navarro Sánchez

Area
  - Total: 41 km^{2} (16 sq mi)
  - Land: 41 km^{2} (16 sq mi)
  - Water: 0.00 km^{2} (0 sq mi)

Population (2025-01-01)
  - Total: 793
  - Density: 19/km^{2} (50/sq mi)
- Time zone: UTC+1 (CET)
  - Summer (DST): UTC+2 (CEST)

Alájar is a town and municipality located in the province of Huelva, Spain. According to the 2025 municipal register, the city has a population of 793 inhabitants. The song "Señorita" of the Bollywood movie Zindagi Na Milegi Dobara was shot in this town.

Alájar had 8 villages in the 19th century. Currently, only 4 villages are inhabited: El Calabacino, El Collado, El Cabezuelo and Los Madroñeros.

== Demographics ==
Historical population
Year	Pop.	±%
1999	794	—
2000	776	−2.3%
2001	789	+1.7%
2002	781	−1.0%
2003	769	−1.5%
2004	750	−2.5%
2005	771	+2.8%
Source: INE (Spain)

== Tourism ==
Benito Arias Montano retired to La Peña de Arias Montano after his work on the Polyglot Bible and participation in the Council of Trent. This community receives many visitors each year. Here the bust of the great humanist and theologian of the sixteenth century, engraved by Eugenio Hermoso on the occasion of his centenary in 1927, can be found.

In 2011 Bollywood drew attention to this small town with the film Sólo se vive una vez (You Only Live Once, Zindagi Na Milegi Dobara) from director Zoya Akhtar, the filming of the song "Señorita" from the film took place over three nights, which also featured locals dressed in costumes.

== Main sights ==
- Reina de los Ángeles Hermitage
- San Marcos Church
- St. Bartholomew Hermitage
- Portada almohadillada
- Espadaña y garitas
- "Peña de Arias Montano" Natural Monument

=== "Peña de Arias Montano" Natural Monument ===
Monumento Natural Peña de Arias Montano or Peña de Alájar is a natural monument of historical and landscape value. The humanist Benito Arias Montano lived here, and the area was renamed after him so that nowadays it goes by the name of "Peña de Arias Montano". It offers views of Alájar and everything south of the province of Huelva. Below is a network of caves among which is Palacio Osucro, a cave which currently remains closed.

=== Reina de los Ángeles Hermitage ===
The Ermita de la Reina de los Ángeles (Reina de los Ángeles Hermitage) or Ermita de Nuestra Señora de los Ángeles (Our lady of los Ángeles Hermitage) is located within la Peña de Alájar. This sixteenth-century chapel is a building consisting of heterogeneous aggregations to a small temple. It consists of a nave, priest and dressing room, in addition to a vestry, housing and enclosures. The nave, with strong deformations to the floor, has two pointed transverse arches that spring from pillars.

=== Portada almohadillada ===
It is located in front of the hermitage. It consists of two semi-columns and an arc in addition to the spill nose tongs and some bursts of buttress walls. It lacks historical reference, however it has clear affiliations within Renaissance architecture.

=== Espadaña y garitas ===
Located at the edge of the plateau on which the Reina de los Ángeles Hermitage sits, in la Peña de Arias Montano is a steeple, accompanied by pilastered booth paths, circular and a penpal vault. The steeple has two levels: the bottom has a symmetrical composition with a base of six embedded semi-columns on each side framing a round arch, post-and-beam openings with square windows above and finally two massifs.

The columns on pedestals are independent and carry some terse chapiters. The upper floor is constituted by a parallelepipedal central bulk with a central oval window.

== Gallery ==
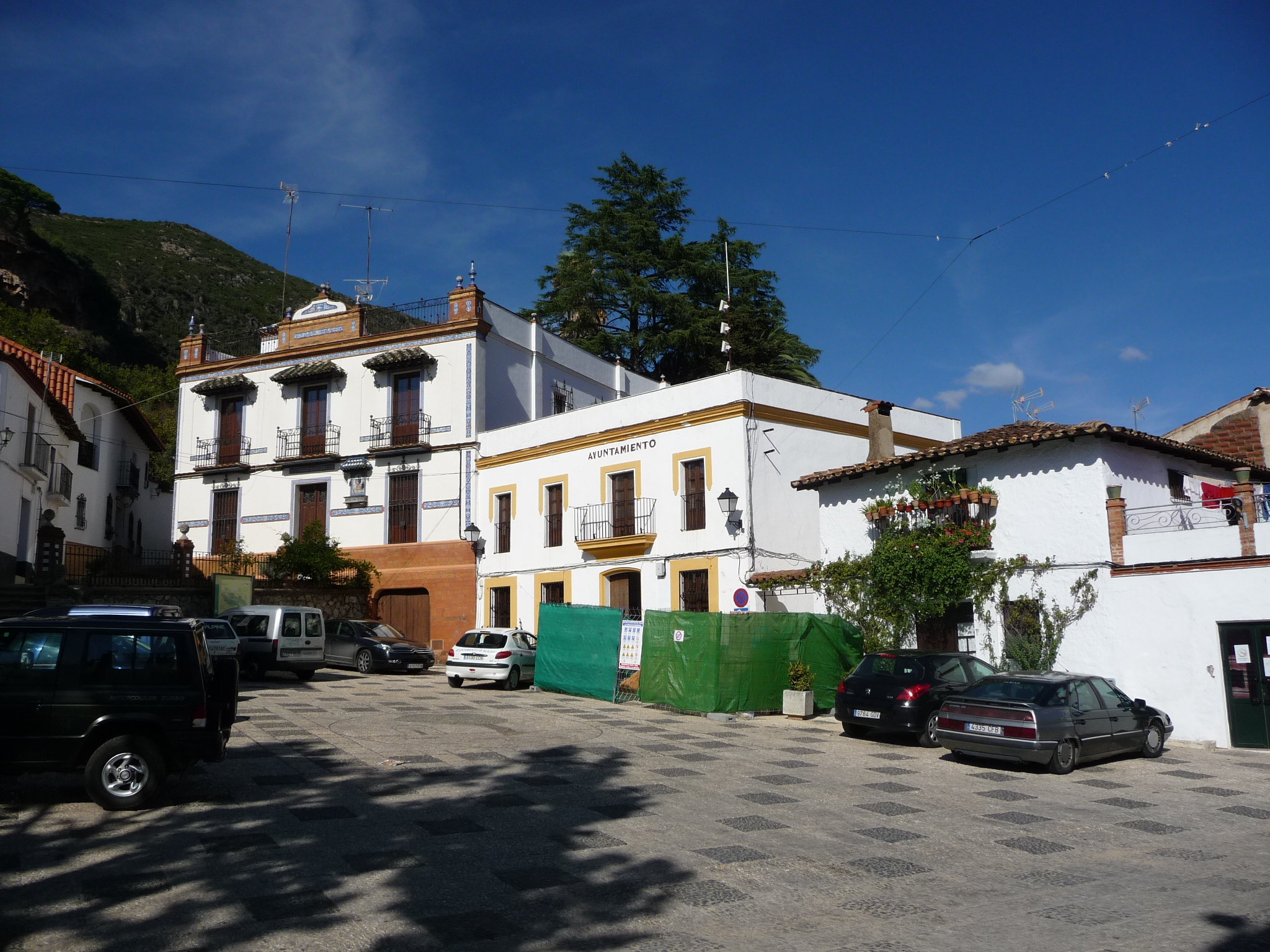
City Hall

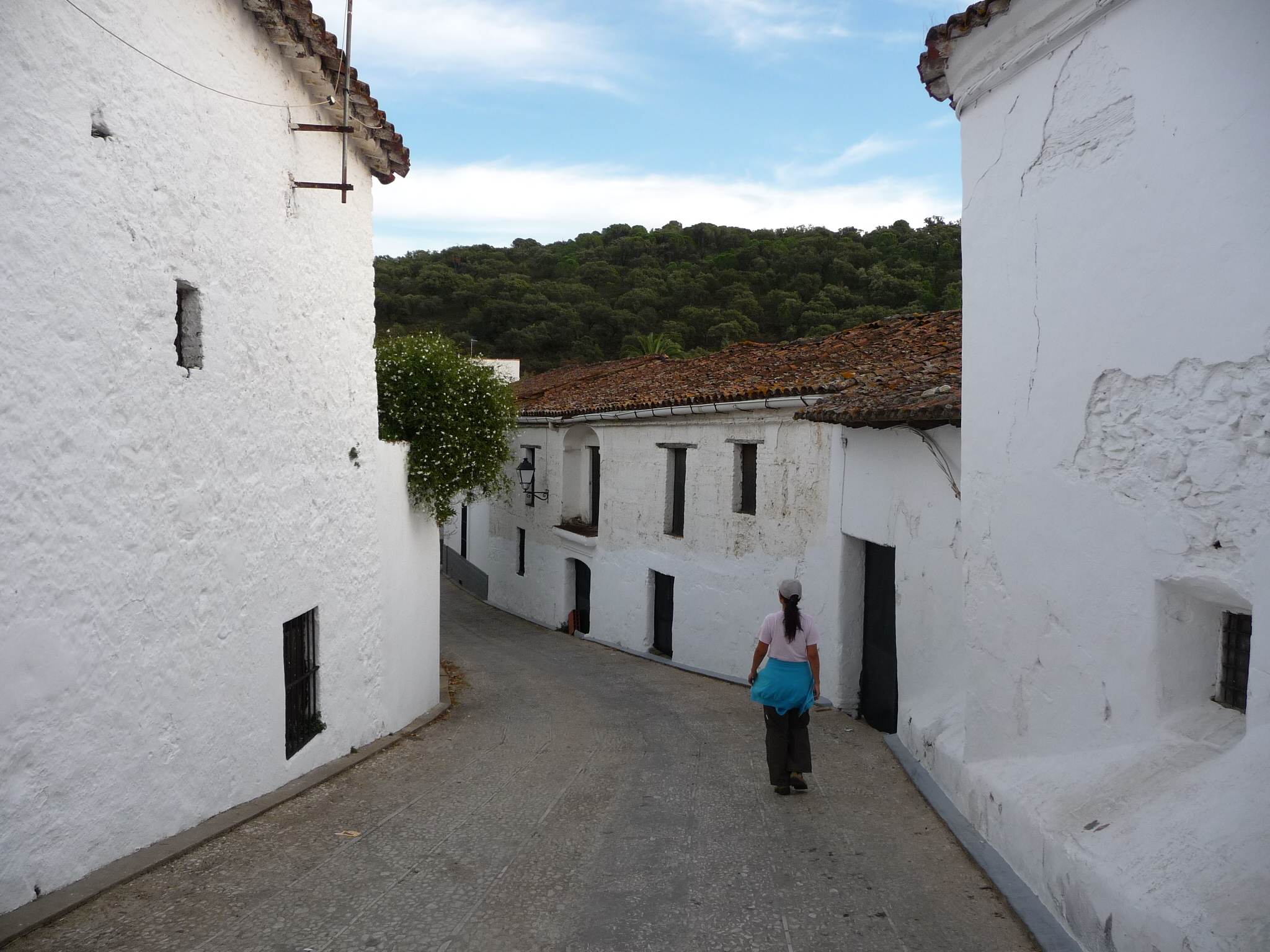
A street in Alájar

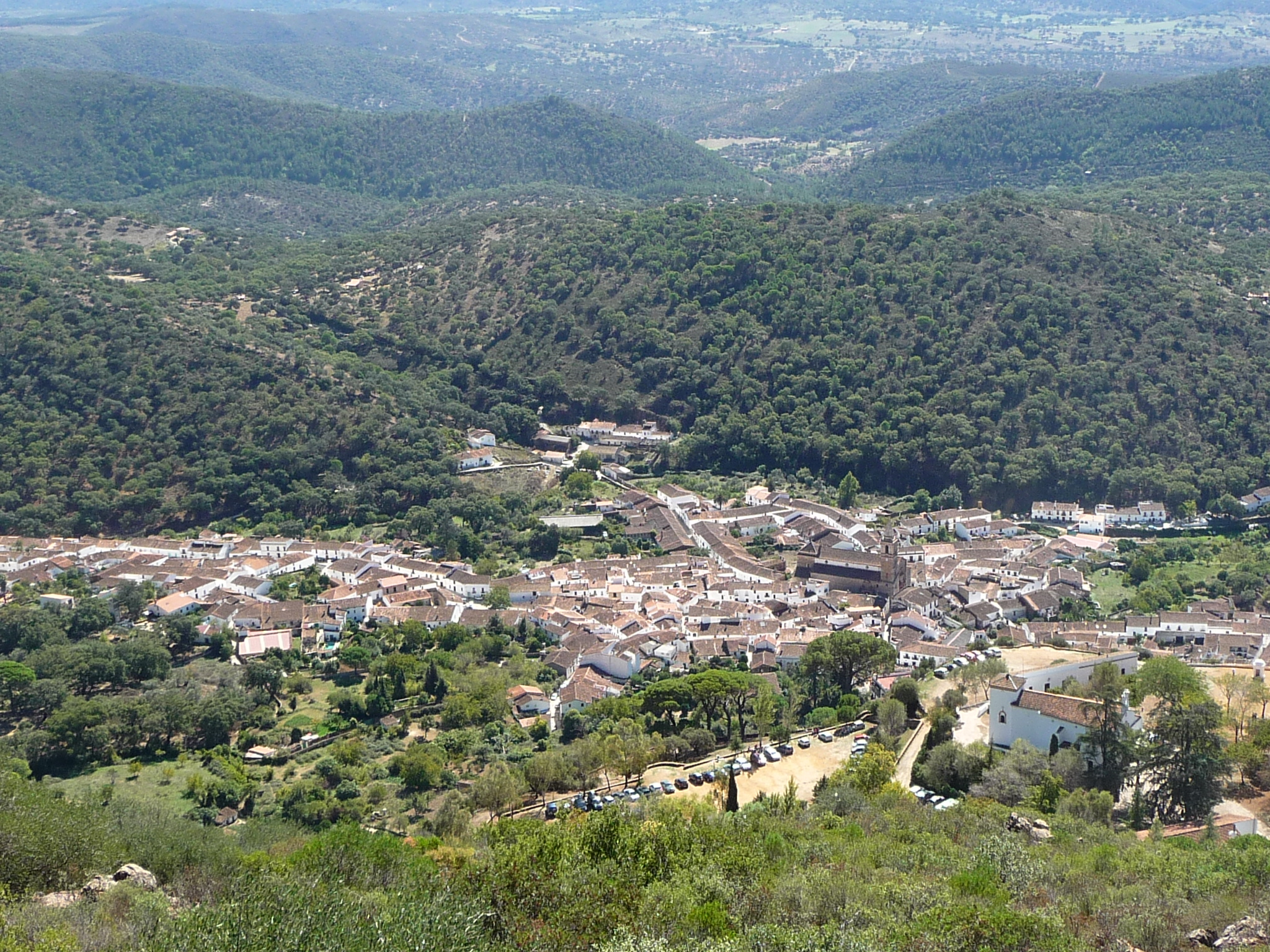
Alájar seen from la Peña de Arias Montano

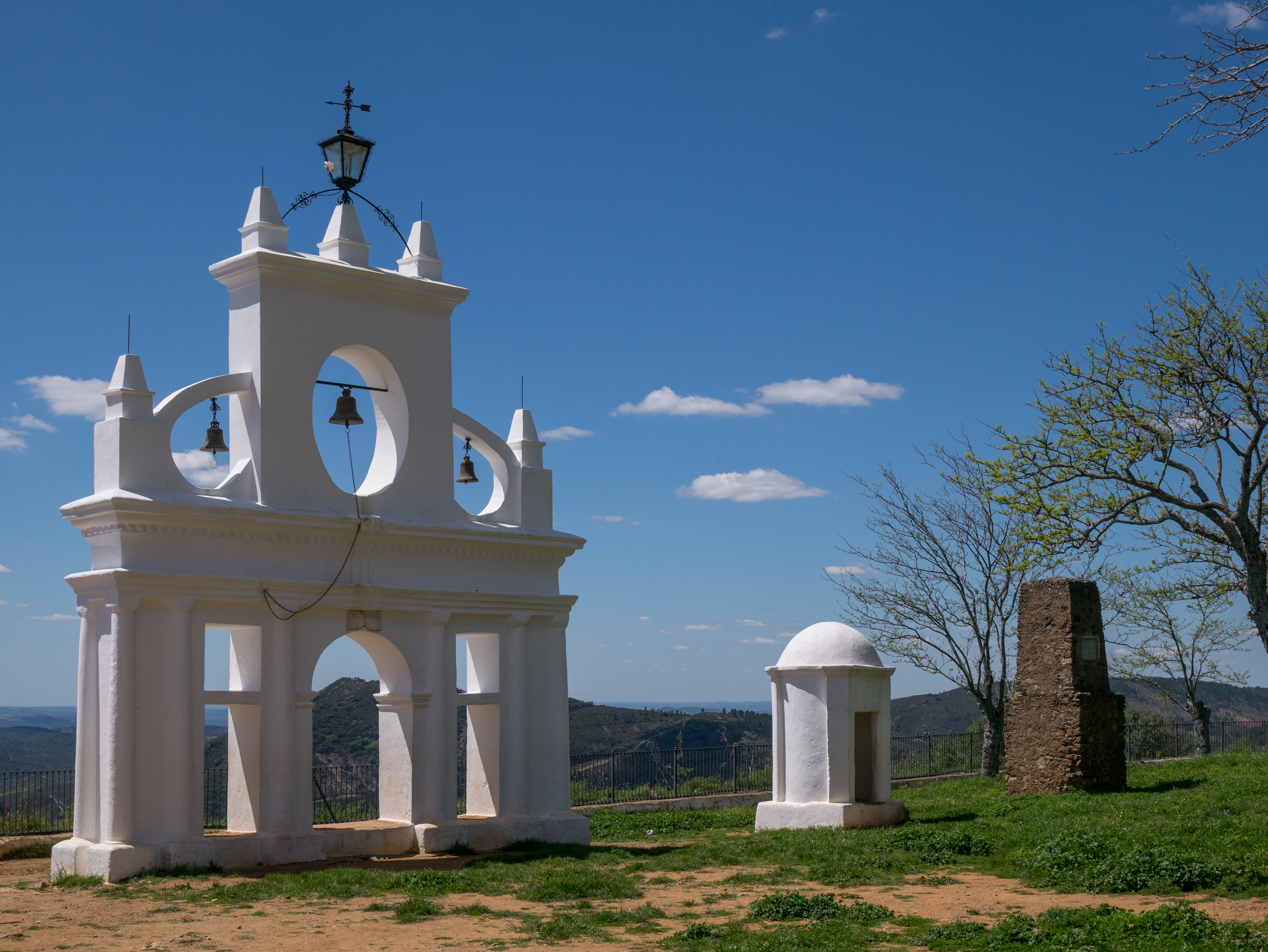
Bell gable at the Reina de los Ángeles chapel

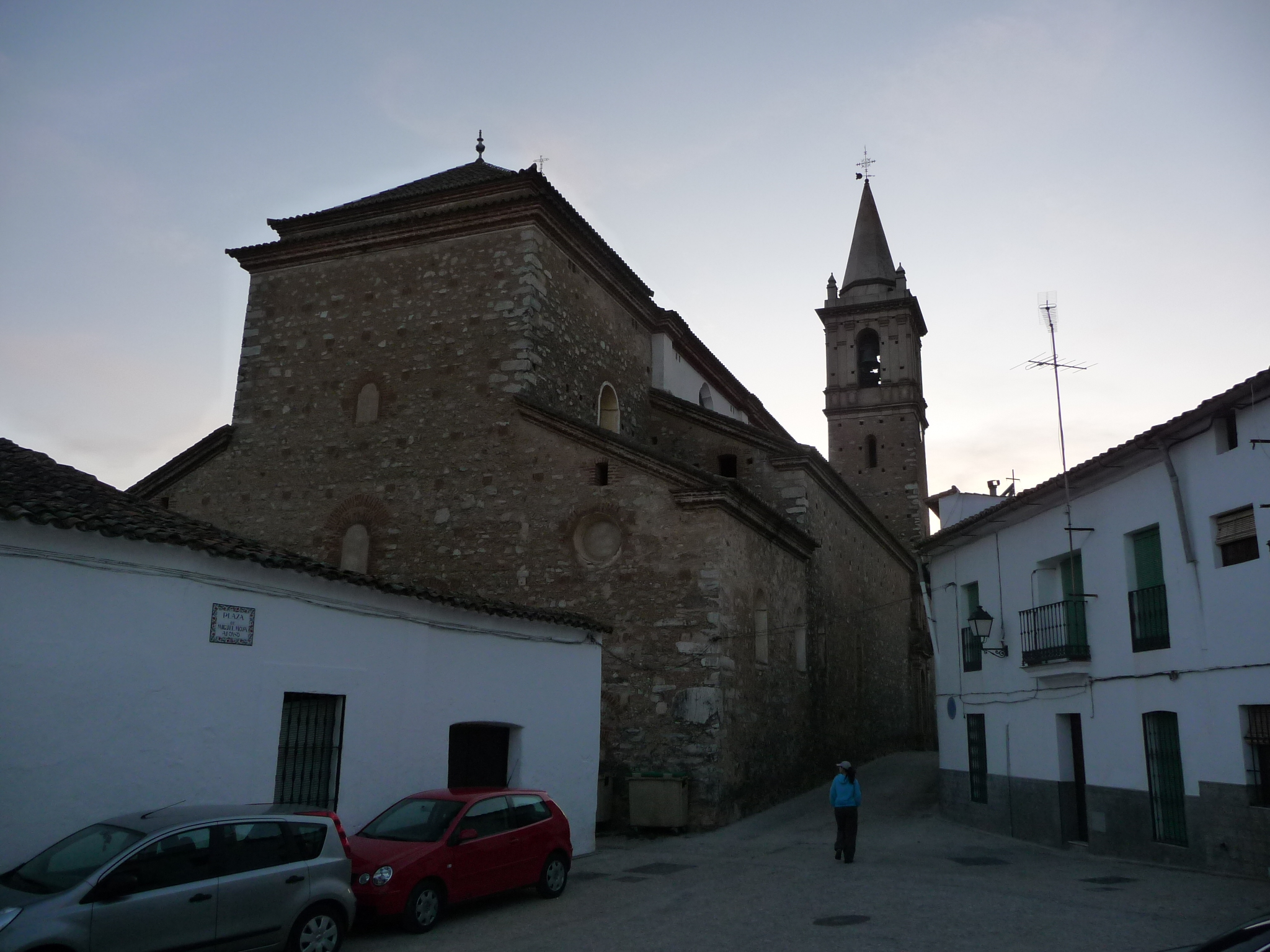
The San Marcos Church around which the village of Alájar is clustered

== See also ==
- List of municipalities in Huelva
