= María del Mar Fernández (singer) =

Spanish singer

Maria del Mar Fernández
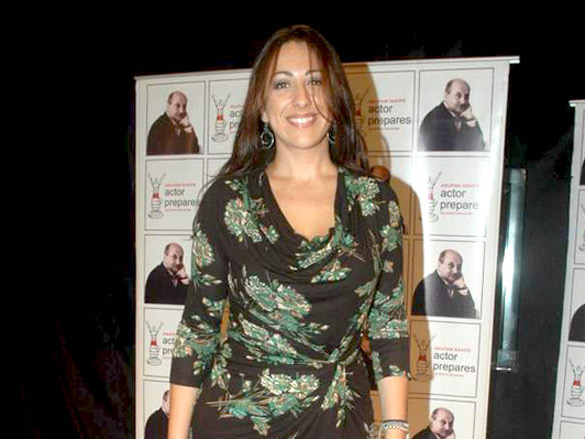
- Maria in 2011

Background information
- Also known as: Maria Delmar
- Born: 1 October 1978 (age 47); Cádiz, Spain
- Genres: Flamenco; Fusion
- Occupation: Singer
- Instrument: Vocalist
- Years active: 1999–present
- Website: www.mariadelmar.com.es

María del Mar Fernández (born 1 October 1978 in Cádiz) is a Spanish flamenco singer best known for her rendering of the song "Señorita" from the 2011 Hindi film Zindagi Na Milegi Dobara.

== Career ==
María began her career as a singer at a young age working with several dance schools of several famous flamenco artists, such as of Mª de Mar Gutierrez, Inma and Pilar Salazar Ogalla, among others.

Later, she went to Japan to work a tablao. She then worked for many famous flamenco artists, like Joaquín Cortés and Paco Peña. She worked on several plays including Tierra Cantaora, Mujeres de Lorca, and De los grandes. She collaborated on several albums with veteran flamenco singer and composer Juan Villar.

She made her film debut singing the Spanish parts of the flamenco song "Señorita" along with Bollywood actors Hrithik Roshan, Abhay Deol and Farhan Akhtar in the 2011 Hindi film Zindagi Na Milegi Dobara by Zoya Akhtar.

She released her first solo album A Woman Cadiz Bollywood in 2013.
