= Zokkomon =

- Theatrical release poster
- Directed by: Satyajit Bhatkal
- Screenplay by: Satyajit Bhatkal; Lancy Fernandes; Svati Chakravarty Bhatkal
- Starring: Darsheel Safary; Manjari Fadnis; Anupam Kher
- Cinematography: Keshav Prakash
- Edited by: Suresh Pai
- Music by: Songs: Shankar–Ehsaan–Loy; Background Score: Hitesh Sonik
- Production company: The Walt Disney Company India
- Distributed by: UTV Motion Pictures (Note: Distributed through the Walt Disney Pictures banner.)
- Release date: 22 April 2011
- Running time: 109 minutes
- Country: India
- Language: Hindi

Zokkomon is a 2011 Indian Hindi-language superhero film produced by The Walt Disney Company India and released by UTV Motion Pictures, written and directed by Satyajit Bhatkal. Starring Darsheel Safary in the lead role, Zokkomon is Disney's fourth involvement in a production for the Indian market (after the animated Roadside Romeo, the Telugu film Anaganaga O Dheerudu, and the l Hindi film Do Dooni Chaar). The music has been composed by Shankar–Ehsaan–Loy. The film received mixed to positive reviews from critics and audiences alike who praised the performances, most notably Safary, Fadnis, and Kher but had criticism towards the story and noted that the film didn't make full use of its potential.

== Plot ==
Kunal is an orphaned boy studying at a boarding school following the death of his parents. One day, he is summoned to the village of Jhunjhun Nagri by his uncle, Deshraj Kumar. Upon arriving, Kunal quickly realises that Deshraj, his wife Rajrani, and his cousin harbour resentment towards him. Enrolled in the local school owned by Deshraj, Kunal discovers the teachers’ incompetence. When he attempts to correct one of them, he is humiliated and punished. He befriends two classmates, Arjun and Rani, who reveal that the students live in fear of their teachers.

One day, Kunal, Arjun, and Rani explore an abandoned palace in the nearby jungle, rumoured to be haunted. There, they encounter a mysterious man who frightens them away. Soon after, Deshraj is confronted by state audit officers investigating the embezzlement of ₹60 lakhs that were allocated for a school library but remain in his bank account. Facing jail time unless he repays the money, Deshraj discovers that Kunal’s late parents had taken out a ₹75 lakh life insurance policy in his name. Desperate, Deshraj takes Kunal to Mumbai under the pretext of a visit to a carnival, abandons him there, and later fakes Kunal’s death in an “accident” to claim the insurance payout.

Lost and alone, Kunal wanders the streets of Mumbai until he meets Kittu Chopra, a kind-hearted homeless woman who secretly lives backstage at a theatre. After learning of Kunal’s plight, Kittu takes him in and shelters him there. Over the next few days, they become close friends and spend time having fun. One day, after hearing his story, Kittu promises to help reunite him with his uncle, but Kunal insists that she take him away if his family mistreats him again. When they are discovered by the theatre guard, they narrowly escape. As they attempt to board a train back to Jhunjhun Nagri, Kittu is arrested by police, leaving Kunal to travel alone.

Back in Jhunjhun Nagri, Arjun and Rani are taken to the village godman, who claims that Kunal was killed by an evil spirit in the abandoned palace and blames the children for his death. When Kunal finally returns, the villagers mistake him for a ghost. Terrified of exposure, Deshraj plots to kill him, but Kunal overhears the plan and flees to the abandoned palace. There, he encounters the mysterious man again, who reveals himself to be Dr. Vivek Rai — a renowned scientist once driven out of the village by Deshraj and the godman for promoting education and rational thought.

Vivek and Kunal decide to work together to expose Deshraj’s corruption and free the villagers from superstition. Using Vivek’s inventions, Kunal assumes the identity of a masked vigilante called “Zokkomon”. As Zokkomon, he uses gadgets to frighten and humiliate the teachers, teaching them a lesson for their cruelty. Believing Kunal’s ghost has returned for revenge, the terrified teachers complain to Deshraj. Zokkomon later confronts Deshraj publicly, embarrassing him before the villagers and inspiring the children to stand up against injustice and superstition.

During a village meeting, Deshraj and the godman attempt to manipulate the crowd through fear, but Zokkomon reappears, splattering them with paintballs and declaring that he will only leave once the villagers abandon blind faith in them. Shortly after, Kittu arrives in Jhunjhun Nagri searching for Kunal. Though initially wary of her interference, Vivek allows Kunal to reunite with her. Kittu, however, plans to take Kunal away to protect him, unwilling to let Vivek endanger the boy’s life any further. She accuses Vivek of using Kunal for his own revenge, but Vivek insists that Zokkomon symbolizes hope and empowerment for the villagers.

That night, Kunal meets Arjun and Rani, telling them the truth about Zokkomon and urging them to keep his mission alive. When a villager spots him, Deshraj gives chase, leading to a pursuit through the forest and the school grounds. Kunal falls from the school’s roof and is knocked unconscious. The schoolchildren, dressed as Zokkomon, corner Deshraj and force him to confess to his crimes, including abandoning Kunal. Kunal survives, and the villagers celebrate their newfound freedom.

In the aftermath, Deshraj is arrested for fraud, and the fake godman is expelled from the village. Dr. Vivek transforms the abandoned palace into a science school, and Kunal, Kittu, and Vivek begin a new life together as a family.

== Cast ==
- Darsheel Safary as Kunal Kumar / Zokkomon
- Manjari Fadnis as Kittu Chopra
- Anupam Kher as Deshraj Kumar (Kunal's uncle) / Dr. Vivek Rai (Double Role)
- Sheeba Chaddha as Rajrani Kumar (Kunal’s aunt)
- Tinnu Anand as Shantaram
- Aayam Mehtas as Tantric Baba
- Atisha Naik as Arju's Mother

== Soundtrack ==
The music is composed by Shankar–Ehsaan–Loy. Lyrics are penned by Ramesh, Lakshmi, and Javed Akhtar

Zokkomon

Soundtrack album by Shankar–Ehsaan–Loy
- Released: 25 March 2011
- Genre: Feature film soundtrack
- Label: Buena Vista

Shankar–Ehsaan–Loy chronology
Game (2011 film) (2011)	Zokkomon (2011)	Zindagi Na Milegi Dobara (2011)

=== Track listing ===
No.	Title	Lyrics	Singer(s)	Length
2.	"Jhunjhunamakadstrama"	Ramesh	Anushka
3.	"Suno Brother"	Anirudh	Lakshmi
4.	"Tum Bin Yeh Dil Ghabraye"	Javed Akhtar	Shaan
5.	"Zokkomon"	Javed Akhtar	Shankar Mahadevan
6.	"Zokkomon - I"	Javed Akhtar	Alyssa Mendonsa, Shankar Mahadevan

== Release ==
The film was originally scheduled for release on 7 May 2010, but due to scheduling conflicts with Bumm Bumm Bole, another film starring Safary, the release date was moved to 22 April 2011.

=== Home media ===
The film was released by Buena Vista Home Entertainment on DVD, digital Download, and on demand on 26 July 2011.

== Reception ==
=== Critical response ===
Zokkomon received mostly favorable reviews from film critics. Kevin Thomas of Los Angeles Times gave the film 4 out of 5, describing the film as a "lively and engaging family film" that has "more substance and cohesiveness than much Bollywood fare." Robert Koehler of Variety calls the production package under Satyajit Bhatkal's direction "thoroughly pro," while Kirk Honeycutt of The Hollywood Reporter says that the first live-action film from Disney Studios India is "designed to give Indian kids their first superhero."

Conversely, Shubhra Gupta of The Indian Express gave the film 2 stars out of 5, writing ″Too bad Zokkomon doesn't make full use of its potential.″ Anuj Kumar in his negative review for The Hindu called the film ″Low on IQ, high on saccharine!″. He further wrote ″We never get to know the logic behind rechristening Kunal Zokkomon in a place where people speak chaste Hindi and the kids are not shown watching any cartoon channel. A name like Zokkomon sounds out of place in such territory, but Bhatkal never substantiates it in the script. Perhaps Disney wants to promote Zokkomon as a long-lost Indian cousin of Doraemon or Pokemon if the film does well. But for now, it comes across as a misplaced marketing move. Darsheel is the best thing about the film. Kher hams big time and Manjari overdoes the cute act.″
