= Adhuna Bhabani =

Hair stylist (born 1967)

- Born: 30 March 1967 (age 59); Liverpool, England
- Other name: Adhuna Akhtar
- Occupation: Hair stylist
- Spouse: Farhan Akhtar (m. 2000; div. 2017)
- Partner: Nicolo Morea (2017–present)
- Children: 2
- Relatives: See Akhtar family

Adhuna Bhabani (born 30 March 1967) is an English hair stylist and the co-host of BBlunt, which airs on TLC.

== Early life ==
Bhabani was born on 30 March 1967 to Bengali father Ashesh Bhabani and English mother Ann Bhabani. As a child, Bhabani used to regularly visit a salon with her mother in the United Kingdom. Her mother was very particular about her hair and there was something about the ambiance of that place which made her want to become a hairdresser. She then enrolled in a training course at Worthington Hair, a salon in Northwest England. Bhabani also participated in, and won, the under-21 National Junior Hairstyling Championship when she was just 17.

== Work ==
Bhabani first launched her salon, Juice, in 1998, in Mumbai, along with her brother and business partner, Osh Bhabani. They subsequently changed the name to BBlunt.

== Bollywood ==
Bhabani made her Bollywood debut as a hairstylist in 2001 with Farhan Akhtar's Dil Chahta Hai. It was a path-breaking film in many ways – including the looks of the actors. It posed huge challenges for her as they had to create special styles for each of the actors – Aamir Khan, Saif Ali Khan, and Akshaye Khanna. The film proved to be a major turning point for her business and the hairdressing industry as a whole.

She also did the hairstyling for the Hrithik Roshan starrer, Lakshya, in 2004. Preity Zinta was given two looks in the film – a long-haired one and a short crop. It was hard since she and her team were working in Ladakh's extreme conditions. She recalls a harrowing time – the first day of the shoot – when Preity's wig began to expand due to the wind and temperature. At the end of it, both Preity and she were in tears, but they managed to make the look work somehow.

== Personal life ==
Bhabani married actor Farhan Akhtar in 2000, after being in a relationship with him for 3 years. They first met during the filming of Himalay Putra, which also marked Bhabani's debut as a Bollywood hairstylist. The couple have two daughters named Shakya and Akira. On 21 January 2016, they announced their separation after 16 years of marriage. Their divorce was finalized on 24 April 2017, with Bhabani having the custody of their children.

In 2017, she started dating Nicolo Morea, the elder brother of actor Dino Morea.
