= Loy Mendonsa =

Indian musician

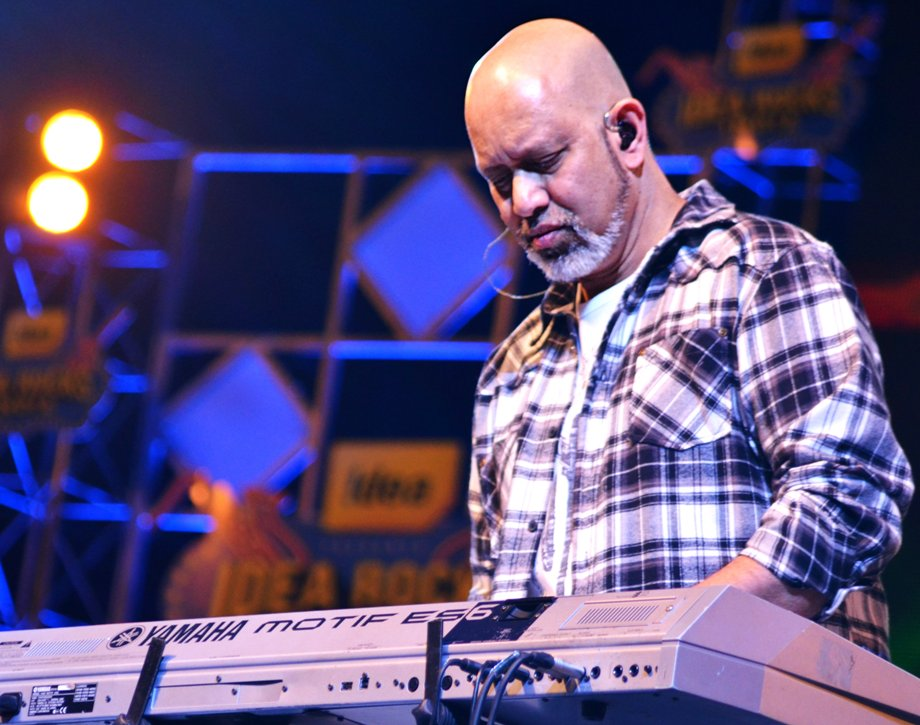
- Mendonsa at Idea Rocks India in Bangalore, India. (April 2013)
- Occupations: Musician; pianist; singer
- Children: Alyssa Mendonsa
- Musical career
- Genres: Bollywood
- Instruments: Piano; electric guitar; bass guitar
- Years active: 1986–present

Loy Mendonsa is an Indian music director and part of the Shankar–Ehsaan–Loy trio which consists of himself, Shankar Mahadevan and Ehsaan Noorani. Before becoming a music composer, he played piano and keyboards for famous Indian music composers such as A. R. Rahman and Nadeem-Shravan. His daughter, Alyssa Mendonsa, made her singing debut with the song Uff Teri Adaa from the movie Karthik Calling Karthik.

Loy Mendonsa started his career by composing the signature tune for The World This Week show on Doordarshan.

== Awards and nominations ==
National Film Awards

2004: Best Music Direction win for Kal Ho Naa Ho

IIFA Awards

2004: Best Music Direction win for Kal Ho Naa Ho

2006: Best Music Direction win for Bunty aur Babli

Filmfare Awards

2001: RD Burman Award for New Music Talent win for Dil Chahta Hai

2001: Best Music Direction nomination for Dil Chahta Hai

2003: Best Music Direction win for Kal Ho Naa Ho

2005: Best Music Direction win for Bunty Aur Babli

Star Screen Awards

2000: Best Background Music nomination for Mission Kashmir

2001: Best Music Direction win for Dil Chahta Hai

2005: Best Music Direction win for Bunty aur Babli

Zee Cine Awards

2006: Best Music Director win for Bunty aur Babli

== Discography ==
=== Hindi ===
Year	Movie	Song(s)	Co-singer(s)	Composer	Lyricist
2004	Kyun! Ho Gaya Na...	"No No!"	Chetan Shashital, Dominique Cerejo, Kunal Ganjawala, Shankar Mahadevan	Shankar-Ehsaan-Loy	Javed Akhtar
