= Alyssa Mendonsa =

Indian playback singer (born 1990 or 1991)

- Born: 1990 or 1991 (age 35–36)
- Occupation: Playback singer
- Father: Loy Mendonsa
- Musical career
- Genres: Filmi
- Instrument: Vocals
- Years active: 2010–present

Alyssa Mendonsa (born 1990 or 1991) is an Indian playback singer who made her debut in the film Karthik Calling Karthik with the song "Uff Teri Adaa".

== Early life ==
Alyssa Mendonsa is the daughter of composer Loy Mendonsa of the Shankar–Ehsaan–Loy trio who compose music for Bollywood films. She also sang "Oh Girl" and "Papa Jag Jayega" along with Neeraj Shridhar and Ritu Pathak for the Sajid Khan movie Housefull. She sang "Adhoore" from Break Ke Baad. She also sang "Baby When You Talk To Me" for the film Patiala House. Her recent song was "Khushfehmiyan" for the film One by Two (2014) with Shankar Mahadevan.

== Career ==
Mendonsa sang "Khaabon Ke Parinday" from the movie Zindagi Na Milegi Dobara. She has rendered a song in the 2013 Malayalam film Amen.

She has written and produced her original composition 'You Were There For Me'.

== Discography ==
Year	Film	Song	Co-Singer(s)
2010	Karthik Calling Karthik	"Uff Teri Adda"	Shankar Mahadevan
2010	Housefull	"Oh Girl You're Mine"	Tarun Sagar, Loy Mendonsa
2010	Housefull	"Papa Jag Jayega"	Ritu Pathak, Neeraj Shridhar
2010	Break Ke Baad	"Adhoore"	Vishal Dadlani
2011	Patiala House	"Baby When You Talk to Me"	Suraj Jagan
2011	Zokkomon		
2011	Zindagi Na Milegi Dobara	Khaabon Ke Parindey	
2013	Amen	"Meen"	
2013	D-Day	"Dhuaan"	Rahul Ram, Siddharth Mahadevan, Thomson Andrews, Keshia Braganza, Crystal Sequeira, Leon D’souza
2014	One by Two		
2015	Dil Dhadakne Do	"Phir Bhi Yeh Zindagi"	Farhan Akhtar, Vishal Dadlani, Divya Kumar, Sapna Pathak
2019	Saaho	"Baby Won't You Tell Me"	Ravi Mishra, Shankar Mahadevan
2019	The Zoya Factor	"Kaash"	Arijit Singh
