= Karthik Calling Karthik =

2010 Indian film by Vijay Lalwani

- Theatrical release poster
- Directed by: Vijay Lalwani
- Written by: Vijay Lalwani
- Produced by: Ritesh Sidhwani; Farhan Akhtar
- Starring: Farhan Akhtar; Deepika Padukone
- Cinematography: Sanu Varghese
- Edited by: Aarti Bajaj
- Music by: Songs: Shankar–Ehsaan–Loy; Score: MIDIval Punditz; Karsh Kale
- Production company: Excel Entertainment
- Distributed by: Eros International through AA Films
- Release date: 26 February 2010
- Running time: 135 minutes
- Country: India
- Language: Hindi

Karthik Calling Karthik is a 2010 Indian Hindi-language psychological thriller film written and directed by Vijay Lalwani and produced by Farhan Akhtar and Ritesh Sidhwani under the banner of Excel Entertainment. The film stars Akhtar and Deepika Padukone, with Ram Kapoor, Shefali Shah, Vivan Bhatena, and Vipin Sharma in supporting roles. The film's music was composed by Shankar–Ehsaan–Loy, while the background score was composed by MIDIval Punditz and Karsh Kale.

Karthik Calling Karthik was released on 26 February 2010, and received positive reviews from critics.

== Plot ==
Karthik Narayan, a shy and insecure construction company employee in Mumbai, struggles with low self-confidence and unresolved childhood trauma. He secretly loves his coworker Shonali Mukherjee, who barely notices him. He is also treated by psychiatrist Dr. Shweta Kapadia because he believes he is responsible for the death of his older brother, Kumar, who supposedly died after accidentally falling into a well during their childhood.

After being publicly humiliated and fired by his boss, Mr. Kamath, Karthik becomes deeply depressed and decides to commit suicide. Before he can do so, he receives a mysterious phone call from someone who sounds exactly like him and claims to be another “Karthik”. The caller promises to guide him and begins calling every day at 5:00 a.m., giving advice that gradually transforms his life. Following these instructions, Karthik gains confidence, confronts Kamath and becomes a manager, overcomes his guilt, and eventually wins Shonali’s love.

The caller, however, warns Karthik never to reveal their conversations. When Karthik tells Shonali and Dr. Kapadia, the caller becomes hostile and begins sabotaging his life. Misunderstandings cause Karthik to lose his job again, Shonali to leave him, and his finances to collapse. Believing the caller is responsible, Karthik flees to Kochi and avoids having a telephone so that he cannot be contacted.

Dr. Kapadia then reveals the truth to Shonali: Karthik suffers from schizophrenia and dissociative identity disorder. The brother he remembers never existed, and the mysterious caller is Karthik’s own alter ego. Each night, Karthik unknowingly records voice messages for himself and schedules them to play at 5:00 a.m., later believing that he has received genuine calls.

After unknowingly recording a threatening message to himself, Karthik becomes so disturbed that he attempts suicide again. Shonali arrives in time to save him and, together with Dr. Kapadia, helps him begin treatment and recovery. Karthik eventually starts rebuilding his life as he learns to cope with his condition.

== Cast ==
- Farhan Akhtar as Karthik "Cheeku" Narayan
- Deepika Padukone as Shonali Mukharjee
- Ram Kapoor as Kamath Sir
- Shefali Shah as Dr. Shweta Kapadia
- Vivan Bhatena as Ashish
- Vipin Sharma as Landlord
- Tarana Raja as Neelu Didi, Karthik's cousin sister
- Vinay Jain as Siddharth "Sid", Neelu's husband
- Yatin Karyekar as Boss at Blue Draft Courier
- Swapnel Desai as Kumar Narayan, Karthik's brother
- Zafar as Mr. Narayan, Karthik's father
- Prachi as Mrs. Narayan, Karthik's mother
- Vidyadhar Karmakar as Old Man at Ticket Collecting Counter
- Brijendra Kala as Staff at Telephone Exchange

== Production ==
In an effort to prepare for his role as the introvert loner Karthik, Farhan Akhtar isolated himself at home and turned off his phone. He also learned to solve the Rubik's Cube, an activity which his character completes in only one try.

== Reception ==
=== Critical reception ===
The film received positive reviews from critics. On the review aggregator website Rotten Tomatoes, 80% of 5 critics' reviews are positive, with an average rating of 5.8/10.

Nikhat Kazmi of Times of India rated the film 3.5/5 stars, calling it "immensely watchable, purely for the class act by Farhan Akhtar in the title role" and recommending it to those who are in the mood for serious cinema. Shweta Parande of News18 gave a rating of 3.5 out of 5, applauding the cast and crew for their performances and their efforts on building up the story as a team. Mayank Shekhar of Hindustan Times gave the film 3 out of 5 stars and wrote, "This one’s clearly not a formula film. It isn’t merely suspense for most parts either. It’s the kind of thriller that practically every Bollywood B, or big budget, genre flick aspires for." Anupama Chopra of NDTV gave it 2.5 out of 5 stars and stated that "it isn't a bad film, but it isn't very good either". Taran Adarsh of Bollywood Hungama gave the film 2.5 out of 5, calling it "a decent product with an unconvincing conclusion". Sukanya Verma of Rediff.com gave the film a 2.5/5 rating, praising Farhan Akhtar for his versatility, while simultaneously criticizing Deepika Padukone for not being able to "hold a single scene on her own".

== Soundtrack ==
Karthik Calling Karthik

Soundtrack album by Shankar–Ehsaan–Loy
- Released: January 2010
- Genre: Feature film soundtrack
- Label: T-Series
- Producers: Farhan Akhtar, Ritesh Sidhwani

Shankar–Ehsaan–Loy chronology
My Name Is Khan (2010)	Karthik Calling Karthik (2010)	Hum Tum Aur Ghost (2010)

Professional ratings
Review scores
Source	Rating
Planet Bollywood	7/10 stars
Glamsham	3/5 stars
Starboxoffice	3/5 stars
Yahoo! Movies	4/5 stars
Music Aloud	6/10 stars

The soundtrack of the film is composed by Shankar–Ehsaan–Loy with lyrics written by Javed Akhtar. The soundtrack album was released on 20 February 2010.

Though the album did not get favorable critical reviews, the track "Uff Teri Adaa" created waves and topped the charts numerous times in the following months. At the box office, the music had an impact in the opening of the film, as it got a bigger opening than its competitor Teen Patti.

Before the album got released, an online copy was leaked onto the Internet. Farhan Akhtar confirmed this and requested people to not download it illegally.

No.	Title	Singer(s)	Length
1.	"Hey Ya!"	Clinton Cerejo, Shankar Mahadevan, Loy Mendonsa	4:17
2.	"Uff Teri Adaa"	Shankar Mahadevan, Alyssa Mendonsa	5:06
3.	"Jaane Ye Kya Hua"	KK	4:10
4.	"Kaisi Hai Yeh Udaasi"	Kailash Kher, Sukanya Purayastha	6:07
5.	"Karthik Calling Karthik"	Suraj Jagan, Caralisa Monteiro, Malika Singh	3:11
6.	"Karthik 2.0"	MIDIval Punditz, Karsh Kale	4:15
7.	"Karthik Calling Karthik" (Theme Remix)	Suraj Jagan, Shankar Mahadevan, Caralisa Monteiro, Malika Singh (Remixed by MIDIval Punditz & Karsh Kale)	3:11
8.	"Hey Ya!" (Remix)	Clinton Cerejo, Shankar Mahadevan, Loy Mendonsa (Remixed by Digital Boyz)	5:17
9.	"Uff Teri Adaa" (Remix)	Alyssa Mendonsa, Shankar Mahadevan (Remixed by Udyan Sagar of Nucleya)	4:06

== Accolades ==
Award	Category	Recipient	Result	Ref.
12th IIFA Awards	Best Male Playback Singer	Shankar Mahadevan	Nominated	
17th Screen Awards	Best Music Director	Shankar–Ehsaan–Loy	Nominated	
2011 Zee Cine Awards	Best Music Director	Shankar–Ehsaan–Loy	Nominated	
3rd Mirchi Music Awards	Male Vocalist of the Year	Shankar Mahadevan	Nominated	
3rd Mirchi Music Awards	Upcoming Female Vocalist of The Year	Sukanya Purkayastha	Nominated	
3rd Mirchi Music Awards	Best Song Recording	Abhay Rumde, Sameer Khan, Kim Koshie, Chinmay Harshe, and Vijay Bengal	Nominated	
