= Señorita (Zindagi Na Milegi Dobara song) =

2011 song from the Indian film Zindagi Na Milegi Dobara

Song by Shankar–Ehsaan–Loy (composer) Farhan Akhtar, Hrithik Roshan, Abhay Deol, María del Mar Fernández (singers)

from the album Zindagi Na Milegi Dobara
- Released: 17 June 2011
- Recorded: 2010
- Genre: Flamenco
- Length: 3:51
- Label: T-Series
- Songwriters: Shankar–Ehsaan–Loy, Javed Akhtar
- Producers: Farhan Akhtar; Ritesh Sidhwani

"Señorita" (transl. Miss) is a song from the soundtrack of the 2011 Indian film Zindagi Na Milegi Dobara. It was composed by Shankar–Ehsaan–Loy and performed by Farhan Akhtar, Hrithik Roshan, Abhay Deol and Spanish singer María del Mar Fernández. The lyrics were penned by Javed Akhtar. The Latino-flavoured Spanish flamenco song is about being yourself and having fun.

== Development ==
Director Zoya Akhtar insisted on Hrithik Roshan, Farhan Akhtar and Abhay Deol singing, as it was the only lip-sync song in the film. The actors agreed to it. The trio sing with traditional Spanish flamenco artist María del Mar Fernández, who made her debut with the song. She was auditioned by Shankar–Ehsaan–Loy to croon the Spanish portions.

This is the first time Abhay Deol has sung for a film, though both Farhan Akhtar and Hrithik Roshan made their singing debuts for Rock On!! and Kites respectively. They recorded a good part of the song by tricking the actors into believing that it is a rehearsal and used it since it sounded good.

== Music video ==
The video, choreographed by the duo of Bosco-Caesar, and shot in front of 'Bar El Parque' in Alájar, features Hrithik Roshan, Farhan Akhtar and Abhay Deol, the three leads with mayor Carmen Osorno and Concha Montero ‘La Taranta'. The mayor and the locals, who had no idea about Bollywood movies and their nature, came all dressed in the third day of the shooting and joined in with the crew. Zoya refused to use extras in the video and got some locals to dance with her lead actors. The song is picturised while on a road trip — the leads have a fun evening, break into a song, tap dance.

== Reception ==
Rediff in its music review, stated, "Señorita treads on cultural stereotypes with its flamenco-inspired beats, ethnic elements and lyricism represented by María Del Mar Fernández yet keeps it interesting by adding its own twist to the take." Meanwhile, Bollywood Hungama described the track as "A fun number with some impressive singing with Hrithik, Farhan and Abhay". Bollyspice reviewer Vanessa Barnes, who loved the song, said, "This is a thoroughly Spanish track, from the guitars, the handclapping, the exuberance and the passion. It made me long to go back to Barcelona, because I can TASTE it."

A report, which was later published on Glamsham, remarked "Señorita has set the heart of nation to dance to the care free tunes of Salsa on which the music of the film is based."

Choreographer duo Bosco-Caesar won the 2011 (59th) National Film Award for Best Choreography for the song, as well as the Filmfare Award for Best Choreography.

=== Charts ===
The song made its debut at #40 in BBC Asian Charts and steadily climbed to #34 by four weeks. Post film release, the song leapt its way to the #3 position.

The song topped the Radio Mirchi Top 10 chart replacing "Ik Junoon (Paint It Red)" from the same album, from the eighth week of its release.

The song made it to the 'Top 10 Hindi Songs of the year 2011' list by Indiatimes.

== Accolades ==
Year	Award Ceremony	Category	Recipient	Result	Reference(s)
2011	Mirchi Music Awards	Song of the Year	-	Won	
2011	Mirchi Music Awards	Music Composer of the Year	Shankar–Ehsaan–Loy	Nominated	
2011	Mirchi Music Awards	Lyricist of The Year	Javed Akhtar	Nominated	
2011	Mirchi Music Awards	Upcoming Male Vocalist of The Year	Hrithik Roshan & Abhay Deol	Nominated	
