= Zindagi Na Milegi Dobara =

2011 Indian film by Zoya Akhtar

- Indian theatrical release poster
- Directed by: Zoya Akhtar
- Written by: Zoya Akhtar; Reema Kagti
- Dialogues by: Farhan Akhtar
- Produced by: Farhan Akhtar; Ritesh Sidhwani
- Starring: Hrithik Roshan; Abhay Deol; Farhan Akhtar; Katrina Kaif; Kalki Koechlin
- Cinematography: Carlos Catalan
- Edited by: Anand Subaya
- Music by: Shankar-Ehsaan-Loy
- Production company: Excel Entertainment
- Distributed by: Eros International
- Release date: 15 July 2011
- Running time: 154 minutes
- Country: India
- Language: Hindi
- Budget: ₹45 crore
- Box office: ₹153 crore

Zindagi Na Milegi Dobara (transl. You Won't Get Your Life Twice), popularly known by its initialism ZNMD, is a 2011 Indian Hindi-language road comedy drama film directed by Zoya Akhtar and produced by Farhan Akhtar and Ritesh Sidhwani under Excel Entertainment. The film stars Hrithik Roshan, Abhay Deol, Farhan Akhtar, Katrina Kaif, and Kalki Koechlin. The film follows three friends from school, Arjun, Kabir, and Imran, who go on a three-week road trip in Spain for Kabir's bachelor party.

It was filmed across Spain, India and the United Kingdom on a budget of ₹45 crore (equivalent to ₹101 crore or US$11 million in 2026). The music and background score were composed by Shankar–Ehsaan–Loy with lyrics written by Javed Akhtar. Zindagi Na Milegi Dobara was initially planned to release on 27 May 2011, but technical problems with post-production work led to the release being postponed to 24 June, and again to 15 July of that year. The film had a worldwide release on 1,800 screens and was a commercial success grossing ₹1.53 billion (US$16 million), becoming the 5th highest-grossing Hindi film of 2011, and received critical acclaim for its direction, story, screenplay, music, dark humor, cinematography and performances of the ensemble cast.

The film is widely regarded as one of Farhan Akhtar's finest acting performances, with particularly praise for his dialogue delivery and comic timing. At the 57th Filmfare Awards, Zindagi Na Milegi Dobara received a leading 13 nominations, and won a leading seven awards, including Best Film, Best Film (Critics), Best Director and Best Supporting Actor (Farhan Akhtar). Additionally, at the 59th National Film Awards, it won two awards – Best Choreography (Bosco-Caesar for "Señorita") and Best Audiography (Baylon Fonseca).

== Plot ==
Kabir Dewan, an architect, proposes to his interior designer girlfriend, Natasha Arora. At their engagement celebration, Natasha discovers that Kabir has planned a three-week bachelor road trip across Spain with his childhood best friends, Imran Qureshi, an advertising copywriter, and Arjun Saluja, a London-based investment banker. Bound by a school-day pact, each friend must secretly choose an adventure sport that all three must complete together. Arjun initially resists the trip because of work, but Kabir persuades him by reminding him that they had abandoned the same vacation four years earlier. Meanwhile, Imran has a personal mission: after finding an old letter addressed to his mother, he plans to locate his biological father, Salman Habib, an artist living in Spain.

The friends reunite in Spain, where Arjun remains glued to his laptop and phone, working remotely throughout the journey. Frustrated, Imran throws Arjun's phone out of the moving car, triggering an argument over a painful betrayal: four years earlier, Imran had slept with Arjun's then-girlfriend, causing the cancellation of their original trip. Kabir intervenes, urging them to let go of the past and not allow it to ruin the vacation.

At the Costa Brava, Imran flirts with Laila, an Anglo-Indian fashion design student. Kabir reveals his chosen challenge: deep-sea diving. Arjun, who has a severe fear of water, is terrified, but Laila, their diving instructor, helps him overcome his phobia and complete the dive. Later, Natasha notices Laila in Kabir's hotel room during a video call and becomes suspicious of his fidelity. At Laila's suggestion, the group postpones their trip to Seville to attend the La Tomatina festival in Buñol with her and her friend Nuria. Afterward, they return to find Natasha waiting unexpectedly at their hotel.

Natasha confronts Kabir but refuses to believe his explanations. After an awkward dinner, Imran and Nuria spend the night together, while Arjun and Laila walk through the city. Arjun reveals that his ambition to retire by forty stems from watching his mother struggle financially after his father's death. Laila encourages him to stop living only for the future, and the two fall in love. The following morning, the group sees Natasha off at the airport. As Laila leaves for Morocco, she chases down their car, stops it, and passionately kisses Arjun. Although Natasha returns to London convinced that Kabir remained faithful, Arjun and Imran question whether Kabir truly wants to marry her.

In Seville, Arjun reveals his chosen adventure: skydiving. Imran, who fears heights, overcomes his phobia with his friends' support. Later, a prank at a bar leads to the trio's arrest. To secure their release, Imran contacts Salman, who admits that he abandoned Imran's mother because he did not want the responsibilities of marriage and fatherhood. Though hurt, Imran gains closure and sincerely apologizes to Arjun for betraying him years earlier, allowing the friends to reconcile.

The journey ends in Pamplona, where Imran reveals his challenge: the running of the bulls. On the eve of the event, Kabir confesses that he never intended to propose to Natasha; she had mistaken a ring meant for his mother for an engagement ring, and he lacked the courage to correct her. Arjun realizes Kabir organized the trip hoping to find the courage to call off the wedding and encourages him to do so, even if it hurts Natasha. Before the run, the friends make one final pact: if they survive, Imran will publish his poetry, Arjun will travel to Morocco to be with Laila regardless of his job, and Kabir will end his engagement. They complete the run safely.

During the closing credits, photographs reveal that Arjun and Laila have married in Morocco, Imran has published his poetry and remains in a relationship with Nuria, and Kabir has ended his engagement to Natasha, who is dating someone else, though the two remain friends.

== Cast ==
- Hrithik Roshan as Arjun Saluja, a financial broker based in London
- Abhay Deol as Kabir Dewan, an architect
- Farhan Akhtar as Imran Qureshi, a copywriter who dabbles in poetry
- Katrina Kaif as Laila, an Anglo-Indian fashion design student
- Kalki Koechlin as Natasha Arora, an interior designer and Kabir's fiancée
- Ariadna Cabrol as Nuria, Laila's friend
- Naseeruddin Shah as Salman Habib, Imran's biological father (special appearance)
- Deepti Naval as Rahila Qureshi, Imran's mother
- Suhel Seth as Natasha's father
- Concha Montero as a flamenco dancer in the song "Señorita"
- Mandi Sidhu as Rohini, Arjun's ex-fiancée

Anupam Kher filmed scenes as Faisal Qureshi, Imran's stepfather, but did not make the theatrical cut.

== Production ==
=== Development ===
In November 2009, director-writer Zoya Akhtar and Reema Kagti completed the scripting of a film after three months of work. The script had the working title Running with the Bulls, before the title Zindagi Na Milegi Dobara was finalised, the new title being an amendment of the line "Zindagi Milegi Na Dobara" from the title song of Rock On!! (2008). Akhtar and Kagti incorporated real-life observations and wrote the character of Imran for the former's brother Farhan, who wrote the dialogue for the film. Farhan produced the film with Ritesh Sidhwani under Excel Entertainment. The theme of the film was "three guys on the verge of making commitments in life", according to him. They used Farhan's father Javed Akhtar's poetry as a voiceover because they felt the poetry added depth to the characters and lent voice to their feelings. A special poem inspired by a fan's poem was written for Katrina Kaif's character after she was cast in the project. The first choice for the location of principal photography was Mexico, but was later changed to Spain because the climax features the running of bulls and Zoya wanted a country that blended history, culture, and sports. The film's release date was postponed twice because its original editor Chandan Arora fell ill and they had to re-edit it.

=== Casting ===
Initially, the producers wanted Ranbir Kapoor and Imran Khan to play two of the three leads, but they declined without specifying a reason. Farhan Akhtar had worked with Zoya on her debut film Luck by Chance (2009) and also wrote dialogue for the film; Zoya felt he would know exactly what she wanted from the film. He was the first actor to be cast in the film. Farhan Akhtar defined his role as a "fun character" and a "guy who for the longest time takes nothing seriously". Hrithik Roshan was chosen for another lead role because he was one of Zoya's favourite actors. After finalising the two, she needed someone "who could not just fit in with them visually but also bring something new to the table." She sought Abhay Deol for the role, as he was her friend and had worked with her before in Kagti's Honeymoon Travels Pvt. Ltd. (2007)

For the role of Laila, Zoya wanted someone with an accent who would be willing to scuba dive, and was a half-Indian and half-Caucasian woman. A lot of women were auditioned for the part in New York and London. Later, at a party, Zoya met Katrina Kaif and chose her for the role. Her role was described as "a free- spirited girl, a wanderer at heart and a bohemian gypsy by nature". Zoya had wanted to work with Kalki Koechlin ever since seeing her in Dev.D (2009) and That Girl in Yellow Boots (2011); she felt Koechlin would suit the character of Natasha because she had "the sense of comedy, but not over-the-top". Spanish actress Ariadna Cabrol was chosen for the role of Nuria because Zoya liked her work in the 2009 Spanish film Eloïse's Lover.

=== Filming ===
Principal photography began in June 2010 and took place in the United Kingdom, Egypt, Mumbai, and in Spain at Barcelona, Pamplona, Buñol and Andalusia. Cinematographer Carlos Catalan, who had worked with Zoya on Luck by Chance, wanted all three lead actors to appear tanned because he "didn't want everything glossed over" and wanted to make the film as realistic as possible.

Kaif's introduction scene was shot on a nudist beach; during the filming, the crew asked beach-goers stay out of the frame to avoid objections from the Central Board of Film Certification. The La Tomatina festival of Buñol was re-created for the song "Ik Junoon"; almost sixteen tons of tomatoes worth ₹10 million (US$110,000) were flown in from Portugal for the scene. A scene involving a kiss between Roshan and Kaif was filmed despite the couple's reluctance to do so. The filming of the flamenco song "Señorita" took place in Alájar, a town in the province of Huelva. The crew warned local residents about the song's volume because the scene was filmed at night. On the third day of filming, locals dressed in costumes attended and the mayor of Alájar joined them. The climax of the film, which features the running of the bulls, was filmed at Pamplona. The final schedules were at Vashi and Alibag in Mumbai in December 2010.

== Soundtrack ==
Composer trio Shankar–Ehsaan–Loy, who had worked with Farhan Akhtar in Rock On!! (2008) and Karthik Calling Karthik (2010), composed the soundtrack for the film. The lyrics were written by Javed Akhtar. The composers engaged María del Mar Fernández, a Spanish flamenco singer, to perform the vocals on "Señorita"; her film-singing debut. The song is also the singing debut of Roshan and Deol, who sang it along with Farhan Akhtar.

== Marketing ==
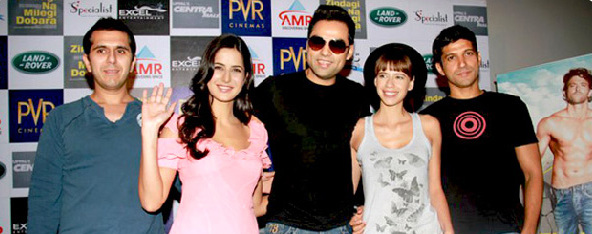
A Zindagi Na Milegi Dobara press conference at Chandigarh.

The trailer of the film was revealed with the prints of Ready which released on 3 June 2011, and was released online on 15 May 2011. Excel Entertainment partnered with Aircel to make promotional videos for the film available on mobile phones and the Internet. The trailer was watched over 55 million times within 48 hours of its release. Two more videos—one each for the songs "Ik Junoon" and "Senorita"—were released on 27 May. The music launch and promotion event took place at Nirmal Lifestyle, Mulund, Mumbai. A press conference promoting the film was held on 1 July at Chandigarh. Two dialogue promos of the film were released on 3 July. On 7 July the cast and crew embarked on a road trip from Mumbai to Delhi via Surat, Vadodra, Ahmedabad, Udaipur, Ajmer and Jaipur that culminated in a concert at Gurgaon. It is believed that British Auto manufacturer Land Rover—which is now owned by Tata Motors—sponsored the Land Rover Discovery driven by the cast members during the trip. A premier at the 12th IIFA Awards before the worldwide release was planned but was not executed.

The film's marketers released branded promotional items with Mountain Dew, Gillette and ING Vysya Bank. A mobile video game based on Zindagi Na Milegi Dobara and the La Tomatina festival was released by Jump Games on 19 July 2011 for popular mobile operating systems. OPIUM Eyewear launched exclusive Zindagi Na Milegi Dobara sunglasses to promote the film.

== Release ==
The release of Zindagi Na Milegi Dobara was initially scheduled for 27 May 2011, but was postponed to 24 June 2011 and again to 15 July 2011. It was released in 1,800 screens worldwide. A special screening of the film was held at the residence of Shah Rukh Khan on 16 July, on the occasion of Kaif's birthday. The event was attended by several celebrities, including the film's cast and crew. The far-right political party Shiv Sena criticised the event because it was held three days after the 2011 Mumbai bombings. The producers of the film donated the collections of the film from around 10 theatres in Mumbai to the Maharashtra government as a mark of charity to the victims of the bombings. On 24 March 2012, ZNMD was screened at Bucks New University in High Wycombe, England.

The film was released on DVD on 30 August 2011. It is available in Dolby Digital 5.1 and stereo formats with English and Arabic subtitles. The film is also available on Blu-ray disc. Later on, the film was made available in both Netflix and Amazon Prime Video.

=== Critical reception ===
Zoya Akhtar has a unique, compelling voice and unlike many of her contemporaries, she actually respects that a cinema audience can be both intelligent and mature.

— Rajeev Masand, CNN-IBN

Zindagi Na Milegi Dobara garnered widespread acclaim from critics who praised its direction, story, screenplay, music, dark humor, cinematography and performances of the ensemble cast. On review aggregator site Rotten Tomatoes, 89% of 18 critics' reviews are positive, with an average rating of 7 out of 10.

Pratim D. Gupta of The Telegraph called Zindagi Na Milegi Dobara "a beautifully scripted journey of catharsis" and praised director Zoya Akhtar for being "fearless in the way she shoots". In his review for Hindustan Times, Mayank Shekhar gave the film four stars praised the film as "a game-changer for Hindi films since Dil Chahta Hai (2001), and wrote, "What you take home are memorable, amusing moments of three truly adventurous amigos we've all grown up with. And will continue to." Shivesh Kumar of IndiaWeekly awarded the film 4 stars. Taran Adarsh of Bollywood Hungama gave the film 3.5/5, calling it a film for "a more evolved, mature and cinema-literate audience that's geared up to embrace and support newer genres of cinema". Nikhat Kazmi of The Times of India gave the film 3.5/5 stars and lauded its lead performances; "If Abhay is the anchor of the group, Farhan's funster role is full of beans and Hrithik's metamorphosis from uptight, money-minded stock broker to carefree vagabond is a class act".

S. Chatterjee of NDTV, gave the film 3/5 stars and said its philosophy is quite old; he praised Zoya Akhtar's direction, stating, "Zoya Akhtar, by investing the tale with a delightful lightness of touch and dollops of gentle wit, brings a degree of freshness to bear upon the plot". Shaikh Ayaz of Rediff rated the film 3.5/5 stars and wrote that Zoya Akhtar had put together a familiar plot but the film's fresh energy is entertaining. He wrote, "Akhtar's invigorating characters pump in fresh energy into a film that could have been strictly mediocre". Kaveree Bamzai of India Today also praised for Akhtar's direction and said, "By the time I finished watching Zindagi Na Milegi Dobara I was convinced that no one can make a romance as beautifully as a woman", giving the film 4 stars.

Subhash K Jha rated Zindagi Na Milegi Dobara 3.5/5 and wrote; "Zoya, God bless her aesthetics, sucks us into the beauty of the moment, not giving us any reason to believe that life's most precious truths are swathed in squalor". Blessy Chettiar of DNA India praised the music and Farhan Akhtar's acting as highlights of the film, saying, "For all this, the storywriters use heavy doses of symbolism. Deep-sea diving at Costa Brava, sky-diving in Sevilla and the San Fermin bull run in Pamplona, not to forget the Tomatina festival in Buñol, where Arjun finally lets go. Fears are drowned, let open in the sky and finally at the mercy of raging bulls", giving it 3 stars. Rajeev Masand of CNN-IBN stated, "Zindagi Na Milegi Dobara takes the light-hearted tone of a fun, all-boys road trip through Spain to give you a deep and heartfelt message on why we should live life by seizing the moment and following our hearts". He also praised the performances, highlighting them as one of the main positives of the film, but also said the film's length "sucks some fun of out of the ride" and gave a rating of 3.5 stars. Raja Sen of Rediff said the film "tried too hard to be cool" and gave it 1.5/5 stars. Sudhish Kamath of The Hindu said "Zoya Akhtar's second outing as a director is way more filmi than her first about the film industry. This one only pretends to be real. It's not."

Ryan Gilbey of The Guardian was broadly positive about the film; he wrote, "It's still playing to full houses, and you can see why. Slick it may be. But tourist board employees representing the various Spanish cities flattered in the movie are not the only ones who will come out grinning", and that he found the film "stubbornly un-macho" for a buddy film. The National reviewer Kaleem Aftab, in his 4-star review wrote; "Throwing together road trip, romcom and buddy-buddy action in a single picture may sound like an ill-conceived masala mash-up, but like any good dish, the ingredients are blended together with affection to create one of the best feel-good movies of the year".

=== Box office ===
In India, Zindagi Na Milegi Dobara came in second on release behind Harry Potter and the Deathly Hallows – Part 2. It opened well in the multiplexes; the occupancy ranged from 70 to 100 per cent, despite receiving an average opening in single-screen cinemas except in the metro cities. The film grossed ₹525 million (US$5.6 million) in its opening three-day weekend, including ₹73.9 million (US$790,000) on its first day, and a net total of ₹265 million (US$2.8 million) on the third day. After ten days of worldwide showings it grossed ₹1.08 billion (US$12 million). In 17 days, it grossed over ₹700 million (US$7.5 million) in India. With no significant competition other than Singham, Zindagi Na Milegi Dobara remained in second place at the box office for four weeks after its release. It was one of the highest-grossing Bollywood films of 2011 in India and internationally; it was declared a blockbuster in India and in overseas territories.

Outside India, Zindagi Na Milegi Dobara grossed ₹120 million (US$1.3 million) in three days, which made it the biggest opening for an Indian film in 2011. The film reached top-twenty lists in the US and UK. It grossed £896,289 in UK, US$3,103,656 in the US, AU$387,384 in Australia and NZ$136,380 in New Zealand. As of January 2012, the film has grossed $7.25 million overseas.

The film grossed ₹1.53 billion (US$16 million) worldwide, surpassing the worldwide gross of Roshan's Dhoom 2 (2006) and becoming the ninth-highest worldwide grossing Bollywood film of all time as of October 2011. As of October 2021, the film is ranked at No. 89 for worldwide grossing of Indian films.

=== Controversies ===
After the release of Zindagi Na Milegi Dobara, animal rights organisation People for the Ethical Treatment of Animals (PETA) objected to the bull-running scene and sought support from fans via their Twitter page to ban the film. PETA spokesperson Poorva Joshipura spoke about the event and said, "We will now be contacting the Ministry of Information and Broadcasting and Central Board of Film Certification to take action". The film's producer Ritesh Sidhwani said, "We had submitted all the papers to the Animal Welfare Board India that stated that none of the animals were injured or hurt in any way and only then, the censor board cleared the movie. We are only showing the culture of Spain." Spanish-American artist Charo sent a letter to Zoya Akhtar on behalf of PETA asking her to remove all of the scenes related to the running of the bulls.

== Accolades ==
Zindagi Na Milegi Dobara won two awards at the 59th National Film Awards in the Best Audiography and Best Choreography categories. It won several other awards—mainly for Best Film and Best Director—at the Filmfare Awards, Stardust Awards, Zee Cine Awards, IIFA Awards, Screen Awards, and the Asian Film Awards.

== Potential sequel ==
Following the film's release, Zoya Akhtar said she had an idea of making a sequel to Zindagi Na Milegi Dobara; she said, "You never know, I might or may not make a sequel. It all depends on the right content." It has been reported that the actors are expected to reprise their roles in the sequel if it is officially launched. In an interview with Hindustan Times, Roshan said the plot of the sequel could be set five or six years after the events depicted in Zindagi Na Milegi Dobara and that the characters would be older and would have a reason to go on another trip. In August 2011, Zoya Akhtar said there were no plans for a sequel, despite requests from many viewers. After the IIFA ceremony, Farhan Akhtar said there was no necessity for a sequel. Later in 2013, in an interview with Hindustan Times, Zoya expressed interest in writing for the sequel after completing the filming of her next project, Dil Dhadakne Do (2015), which was released in June 2015, although in February 2019 she said, "Honestly, people want a second movie of ZNMD, but I think the best franchise would either be Luck By Chance or Dil Dhadakne Do."
