= Farhan Akhtar =

Indian actor and filmmaker (born 1974)

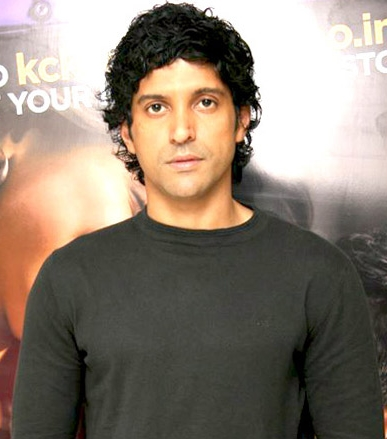
- Akhtar in 2012
- Born: 9 January 1974 (age 52); Mumbai, Maharashtra, India
- Education: H. R. College
- Occupations: Actor; filmmaker; singer
- Years active: 2001–present
- Spouses: Adhuna Bhabani (m. 2000; div. 2017) Shibani Dandekar (m. 2022)
- Children: 2
- Parent(s): Javed Akhtar (father); Honey Irani (mother)
- Relatives: Akhtar–Azmi family
- Awards: Full list

Farhan Akhtar (born 9 January 1974) is an Indian actor, filmmaker and singer who works in Hindi films. Born to screenwriters Javed Akhtar and Honey Irani, he established the production company Excel Entertainment, along with Ritesh Sidhwani, in 1999.

Akhtar made his directorial debut with Dil Chahta Hai (2001), a coming-of-age film that has since become a cult classic. Receiving acclaim for depicting urban youth realistically, the film won the National Award for Best Hindi Film, and two Filmfare Awards for Akhtar (Best Film (Critics) and Best Screenplay). He then directed the war film Lakshya (2004), the action thriller Don (2006) and its sequel Don 2 (2011).

As an actor, Akhtar made his screen debut with the musical drama Rock On!! (2008), for which he won a second National Film Award for Best Hindi Film (as producer) as well as the Filmfare Award for Best Male Debut. He starred in, wrote the dialogues for, and produced the buddy-road film Zindagi Na Milegi Dobara (2011), which won him Filmfare Awards for Best Film, Best Supporting Actor and Best Dialogue. Akhtar then portrayed athlete Milkha Singh in the biopic Bhaag Milkha Bhaag (2013), winning the Filmfare Award for Best Actor. His subsequent roles were in the family drama Dil Dhadakne Do (2015), the crime thriller Wazir (2016), and the dramas The Sky Is Pink (2019) and Toofaan (2021).

== Early life and family ==
Farhan Akhtar was born in Mumbai, the second child of screenwriters Javed Akhtar and Honey Irani. He has one elder sister, the writer–director Zoya Akhtar. His ancestors belonged to Gwalior, Madhya Pradesh. He was very young when his parents divorced; his father married actress Shabana Azmi in 1984. His mother retained the family home in Bandra Bandstand and raised her children there. Akhtar studied at Maneckji Cooper School in Mumbai and then pursued a law degree at HR College, also in Mumbai. Akhtar's father, a Muslim by birth and culture, is a socialist and has described himself as an atheist; Akhtar's mother, born into an Irani Zoroastrian family in India, is indifferent to religion, and was content to let her children grow up with no religion. Akhtar has stated that he is an atheist.

Akhtar's family hails from Khairabad in the Avadh region of present-day Uttar Pradesh, and he comes from a long lineage of Urdu poets. He is the grandson of Urdu poet Jan Nisar Akhtar and great-grandson of Urdu poet Muztar Khairabadi. On his mother's side, Akhtar is the nephew of the child actress Daisy Irani and the first cousin of choreographer & director Farah Khan and film director Sajid Khan.

== Personal life ==
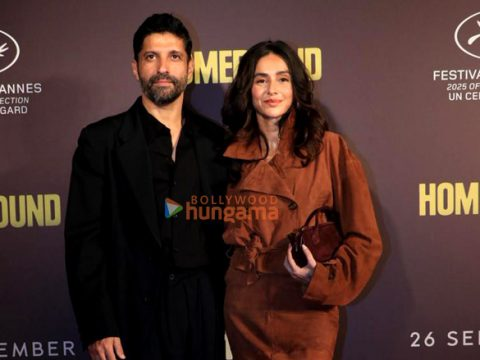
Akhtar with wife Shibani Dandekar in 2025

Akhtar married Adhuna Bhabani in 2000, after being in a relationship with her for 3 years. They first met during the filming of his directorial debut Dil Chahta Hai, which also marked Bhabani's debut as a Bollywood hairstylist. The couple has two daughters named Shakya and Akira. On 21 January 2016, they announced their separation after 16 years of marriage. Their divorce was finalised on 24 April 2017, with Bhabani having custody of their children.

Akhtar started dating video jockey Shibani Dandekar in 2018. On 19 February 2022, they got married in a non-religious ceremony at his Khandala farmhouse.

== Career ==
Akhtar worked as an apprentice in film distribution and direction for Yash Chopra's Lamhe (1991) when he was 17 years old and later moved to an advertisement production house named "Script Shop" to spend an approximate 3 years there. He also assisted Pankaj Parashar as a director in Himalay Putra (1997) before launching himself into direction and writing.

=== Directing, writing and producing ===
Akhtar made his writing and directorial debut with the critically acclaimed coming-of-age comedy-drama Dil Chahta Hai (2001), produced by Excel Entertainment, a production company he established along with Ritesh Sidhwani in 1999. It was shot over a period of three months in Sydney, Goa and Mumbai. Due to its acclaim, he called it a "turning point" in his career. The film dealt with the lives of westernised urban youth in Mumbai. Akhtar had written the script based on his trips to Goa and New York City, as well as a narration of a story outline by a friend of his, Kassim Jagmagia, who would eventually become a co-producer at Excel Entertainment in the future. It received international critical acclaim and attained an iconic status, with Akhtar receiving credit for starting a "new wave" in Indian cinema. Critic Ziya Us Salam praised Akhtar's direction and commented for The Hindu: "In his maiden venture, Javed Akhtar's son shows enough glimpses of his pedigree to indicate that promise will attain fulfilment sooner than later." Various award shows conferred accolades on the film and nominated it for several categories. The film won the National Film Award for Best Feature Film in Hindi for 2002, in addition to the Filmfare Award for Best Film (Critics). It was also screened at the International Film Festival of India, the Palm Springs International Film Festival, and the Austin Film Festival. In the same year, he and his sister Zoya Akhtar assisted their father in writing the English lyrics of a song in Lagaan, for which the soundtrack was scored by A. R. Rahman.

Akhtar's next project was the war drama Lakshya (2004), a film about an aimless youngster finally setting a goal for himself, starring Amitabh Bachchan, Hrithik Roshan and Preity Zinta. It was shot in Ladakh, Dehra Dun and Mumbai, and marked the beginning of the collaborations between Akhtar and Roshan. He had to research the army before writing the script and directing the venture. The theme of the film, as stated by Akhtar, was about "finding oneself". He also believed that if the same characters and situation were set elsewhere, the main core of the story would remain the same as the film was not about war, as it had been reported. Post-release, the film failed to make a mark at the box office and became a commercial failure. Parul Gupta of The Times of India gave it a negative review and explained that "It's hard to reconcile to such triviality when it comes from Farhan Akhtar, considered the ultimate symbol of cool in Hindi filmdom." On the contrary, Manish Gajjar from BBC wrote, in his positive review: "Young Farhan Akhtar, proves yet again that he is one of the finest directors Bollywood has to date. He has paid full attention to the script and the technical aspects, giving rise to a polished product". Over the years, the film became a cult classic and was praised to be one of the best movies ever made. 20 years after Lakshya was released, Akhtar, in an interview, stated that the movie made a huge impact in motivating youth across India to join the Indian Army.

Meanwhile, Akhtar wrote the English lyrics of Gurinder Chadha's Hollywood film Bride and Prejudice (2004), along with his sister, Zoya Akhtar, after being recommended by his father. The music for the film was composed by Anu Malik and consisted of a mixture of Hindi songs, West Side Story, Fiddler on the Roof and Grease.

In 2006, Akhtar directed, produced and wrote the screenplay of Don starring Shah Rukh Khan in the title role alongside Priyanka Chopra, a remake of Don (1978), starring Amitabh Bachchan and Zeenat Aman. It marked his first project holding the status of a remake. The character of Don became iconic and popular. Despite this, he noted that he did not mean to be a "torchbearer of the remake brigade" and did not feel comfortable with being credited for the trend of remakes in the film industry. The film released on 20 October 2006 and was declared a "hit" at the box office, grossing around ₹1.05 billion (equivalent to ₹3.7 billion or US$39 million in 2026) worldwide. The film was particularly noted for its dialogues. However, critics predominantly condemned Akhtar's direction and screenplay. Taran Adarsh of Bollywood Hungama said Akhtar had "climbed the ladder as far as craftsmanship is concerned [every frame is well decorated and makes a spellbinding impact] but despite a readymade classic at his disposal, the storyteller just doesn't get it right this time."

In 2007, Akhtar produced the film Honeymoon Travels Pvt. Ltd., directed by debutant Reema Kagti and starring Abhay Deol, Minissha Lamba, Shabana Azmi and Boman Irani. The music for the film was composed by Vishal–Shekhar, marking their first collaboration with him. Akhtar was supposed to make his acting debut with the film, but he had to be replaced by Abhay Deol as he was involved with Don. The film was financed and funded by Exim Bank. This was the first time Excel Entertainment collaborated with a different director as all their previous projects had been involving Akhtar as a director. The story of the film revolved around six couples who went to Goa on a honeymoon. The film opened up on 23 February and received mixed reviews from critics, and ended up with an "average" box office result.

In the same year, Akhtar directed Positive, a film produced by Shernaz Italia and Frenzy Kodaiji, starring Boman Irani and Shabana Azmi. It was a short film running for 12 minutes. Dealing with a family's attitude towards a person suffering from HIV-AIDS, the film was shot in Mumbai and aimed at creating awareness about the problem. It also introduced Arjun Mathur in the film industry. Speaking about the purpose of the project, Akhtar stated that "Just as a social stigma, many people believe that an HIV patient should be isolated. They also have certain misconceptions about dealing with the disease. And since India has a lot of joint families, it becomes very important for them to understand the value of support to the person who has acquired this disease. This is exactly what Positive talks about." The film had its background score composed by Ram Sampath but had no soundtrack. It was a part of the "AIDS JaaGo" ("AIDS Awake"), a series of four short films, directed by Mira Nair, Santosh Sivan, Vishal Bhardwaj and himself, in a joint initiative of Mira Nair's Mirabai Films, voluntary organisations Avahan and the Bill & Melinda Gates Foundation.

Akhtar's first project in 2011 as a writer and producer was the mystery thriller Game, directed by Abhinay Deo. The lead cast consisted of Abhishek Bachchan, Kangana Ranaut, Boman Irani and Jimmy Shergill. The film received highly negative reviews post release, with critics panning almost all the aspects of it. At the box office, it had a poor opening, and later resulted in giving losses for the distributors, due to a heavily negative word-of-mouth. It was described as a "washout" by trade analysts.

Later that year, Akhtar wrote, produced and directed Don 2, a sequel to his previous venture Don (2006). It marked his return to direction after a gap of nearly 5 years. His decision of making a sequel was explained by him in an interview: "I am wary of sequels having to be made. With Don 2 I could finally make an action thriller the way I wanted to. Good story, classic action and simple plot which has one goal and work towards it effectively and dramatically." The film was a major success in India and went on to become the year's highest-grossing Bollywood production in overseas markets with a worldwide gross of ₹2.1 billion (equivalent to ₹4.3 billion or US$46 million in 2026). It received predominantly positive reviews from critics, with Khalid Mohammed stating: "Throughout, you can't help feeling that Farhan Akhtar could have made three far more valuable films out of the budget squandered on this thriller where cars are smashed as if they were tea cups."

In 2012, Akhtar produced and wrote the script of the neo-noir thriller Talaash: The Answer Lies Within. His production work was followed by the comedy films Fukrey (2013), Bangistan (2015) and Fukrey Returns (2017), the time-travel romance Baar Baar Dekho (2016) and the action film Raees (2017).

In 2024, he produced the film Boong. In January 2026, it was nominated in the Best Children's and Family Film category at the 79th British Academy Film Awards.

=== Acting and singing ===
In 2008, Akhtar made his solo acting and singing debut in the musical drama Rock On!!, for which he wrote the script and also produced. The film was directed by Abhishek Kapoor, and co-starred Prachi Desai, Arjun Rampal and Purab Kohli. As he had been learning guitar ever since the start of his directing career, he had been well-versed with it and used it for the film. He played the role of Aditya, the lead singer of the rock band "Magik". He sang five songs for the soundtrack album. Rock On!! received critical acclaim upon release. Gaurav Malani of The Economic Times wrote that the film seemed to be "clearly designed by Farhan Akhar as his own acting debut and he doesn't let himself down. Lending voice to all his songs helps him to get into his character with effortless ease. One could certainly overlook the lisp in his dialogue delivery." Manish Gajjar of BBC wrote of his performance: "Director-turned-actor, Farhan Aktar surprises all with his superb, flawless performance, transforming from a hippy-style lead-singer to a subdued, dismal workaholic banker." Akhtar received several accolades for his debut performance. The film, in addition won the National Film Award for Best Feature Film in Hindi. However, it did not create an impact at the box office and turned out to be an "average" grosser.

After refusing an offer to sing a song for A. R. Rahman's album Blue (2009), Akhtar acted in, and produced his sister Zoya's directorial and written debut Luck By Chance, alongside Konkona Sen Sharma in the lead role. He was cast in the film after being deemed as a "perfect choice" for it. The story of the film revolved around a struggling actor who arrives in Mumbai to become a movie star. It was released on 30 January 2009. Though failing to do well at the box office and being declared a "flop", the film received widespread critical acclaim. Neil Genzlinger from The New York Times said: "It is Mr. Akhtar whose understated performance holds together this far-ranging, cameo-filled film. He manages to remain sympathetic even while wreaking romantic havoc." Rajeev Masand noted: "Farhan Akhtar delivers a simple-enough likeable performance that is just what the film required — no showy flourishes, no loud outbursts, just a straight off spontaneous act that works like a dream."

Following Luck By Chance, Akhtar acted in a film titled The Fakir of Venice, which was initially scheduled to release before Rock On!! and was supposed to be his acting debut. Due to several delays, it was premiered at the 2009 Indian Film Festival of Los Angeles. It was written and directed by Anand Surapur, and accepted by Akhtar after he described its script as "very powerful", while emphasising that it "touches upon weaknesses and confusions in all human beings". Before release, it premiered at the Indian Film Festival of Los Angeles, and the Venice Film Festival at the ArcLight Hollywood. Kirk Honeycutt of The Hollywood Reporter praised the film and felt that "Akhtar, a producer, director and writer making his film debut here as an actor, is talented and handsome enough – and with looks that could translate into any number of ethnicities – to have a huge career ahead of him."

Akhtar acted in, and produced his next film Karthik Calling Karthik (2010), a psychological thriller directed by Vijay Lalwani. He played Karthik, an introvert, paired opposite Deepika Padukone for the first time. Preparation for the role involved working on the Rubik's Cube, which he learnt from the director. The film received mixed reviews, but Akhtar's performance received praise, with Sukanya Verma highlighting that "He conveys the anxiety, simplicity and frailty of Karthik even when the script isn't doing it for him. Perhaps it's his innate filmmaker instinct." The film had a good opening at the box office, as it was targeted towards the youth of the multiplexes. However, it failed to do well at the box office and became a "below average" grosser.

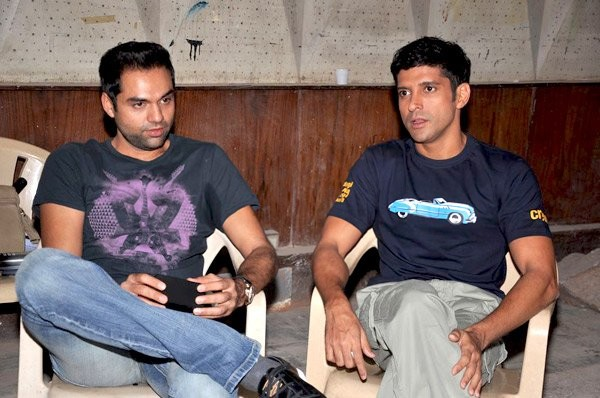
Akhtar with Abhay Deol promoting Zindagi Na Milegi Dobara

Akhtar produced and appeared as one of the three leads in his sister, Zoya Akhtar's coming-of-age film Zindagi Na Milegi Dobara along with Hrithik Roshan, Abhay Deol, Katrina Kaif and Kalki Koechlin. He was also credited as the scriptwriter for the film. He was the first actor to be cast in the film, and described his role as a "fun character" and a "guy who for the longest time takes nothing seriously". His real life father, Javed Akhtar wrote poetry for the film, which he performs as a voice-over. His performance received widespread critical acclaim, with Shaikh Ayaz of Rediff.com highlighting his lines as "gentle, they won't make you ROFL; they are more like tender dig in the ribs." Kaveree Bamzai of India Today called his acting "sensitive, soulful", further saying that he was "perfectly capable of reading out his father's poetry." The film made ₹1.53 billion (equivalent to ₹3.4 billion or US$37 million in 2026) worldwide and was declared a major commercial success at the box office. It also became one of the highest grossing Bollywood films overseas, earning around US$7.25 million. It won two National Awards for Best Choreography and Best Audiography.

Following Zindagi Na Milegi Dobara, his next acting venture was the biopic Bhaag Milkha Bhaag (2013), based on the Indian athlete Milkha Singh, popularly known as 'the Flying Sikh'. His performance received critical acclaim and earned him the Filmfare Award for Best Actor. He also had to prepare his looks to depict a 17-year-old army recruit and endure an on-the-spot preparation at an army cantonment.

In 2014, Akhtar starred alongside Vidya Balan in the romantic comedy Shaadi Ke Side Effects directed by Saket Chaudhary and produced by Pritish Nandy. It was a sequel to Pyaar Ke Side Effects (2006). In 2015, Akhtar starred in his sister Zoya Akhtar's Dil Dhadakne Do, an ensemble family comedy-drama starring Anil Kapoor, Shefali Shah, Priyanka Chopra, Ranveer Singh and Anushka Sharma.

In 2016, Akhtar played the lead role of an Anti-Terrorism Squad officer in Bejoy Nambiar's Wazir. It was his first action role as an actor, and for which he went through intense physical training and put on eight kilograms of weight. Raja Sen in his review called him "pretty good [..] in the initial portions, but his performance starts to unravel once the film hits hysterical gear and he is required to do more than frown." Akhtar also sang the duet "Atrangi Yaari" with Amitabh Bachchan for the flm. The film emerged as a box-office success. Akhtar's final release of the year was the rock musical drama Rock On 2, a sequel to Rock On!! (2008). He reprised his role of Aditya Shroff, the lead singer of his band. The film was Akhtar's attempt to bring Northeast India into popular culture.

In 2017, Akhtar essayed the role of a Dawood Ibrahim-alike mafia don Maqsood in Daddy, co-starring Arjun Rampal. His next release was the prison drama Lucknow Central, co-starring Diana Penty, Gippy Grewal and Deepak Dobriyal. The film was about a prison escape drama planned by a group of prisoners who also form a music band and was inspired by a real incident. Lucknow Central was released on 15 September 2017 and met with mixed reviews and low financial returns.

Akhtar's next release, the biographical drama The Sky Is Pink (2019), co-starring Priyanka Chopra, Zaira Wasim and Rohit Saraf, premiered at the Toronto International Film Festival and received a 15-minute standing ovation from the audience at the Roy Thomson Hall. The film received widespread critical acclaim, but failed to do well commercially. Akhtar received training for boxing for his next release Toofan, a sports drama, directed by Rakeysh Omprakash Mehra, which premiered on 21 May 2021 on Amazon Prime Video.

In February 2026 it was announced he would portray musician Ravi Shankar in The Beatles – A Four-Film Cinematic Event, a biographical film series about the Beatles directed by Sam Mendes.

== Other work ==
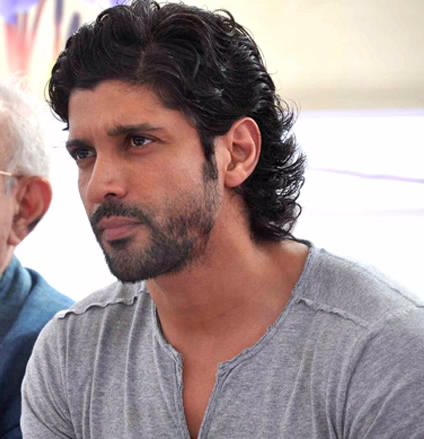
Akhtar at a tree planting event in 2012

Akhtar appeared as one of the nine judges in the beauty pageant Femina Miss India (2002). He was the judge on the first season of the dance-reality show Nach Baliye (2005). He hosted a TV show on NDTV Imagine, called Oye! It's Friday! in the same year. He has endorsed several brands as a part of his career, especially after the release of Zindagi Na Milegi Dobara. These include Hindustan Unilever's water purifier product titled Pureit, Chivas Regal, Britannia Nutri Choice Biscuits, IndusInd Bank, Dulux Paint, Titan Industries and Crocin+2.

Men Against Rape and Discrimination, or MARD (lit. 'Man'), is a social campaign launched by Akhtar. The idea came to him when, in August 2012, Pallavi Purkayastha, a lawyer by profession, was sexually assaulted and then killed by her residence's watchman.

He is the board member of Mumbai Academy of the Moving Image. He has also been the Regional UN Women Ambassador for South Asia since 2016.

In 2023, Farhan received the Kamla Bhasin Award for his efforts in promoting gender equality in South Asia.

== Filmography ==
=== Filmmaking credits ===
Year	Title	Credited as			Notes
Year	Title	Director	Writer	Producer	Notes
2001	Dil Chahta Hai	Yes	Yes	Yes	
2004	Lakshya	Yes		Yes	
2006	Don – The Chase Begins Again	Yes	Yes	Yes	
2007	Honeymoon Travels Pvt. Ltd.			Yes	
2007	Positive	Yes	Yes	Yes	Short film
2008	Rock On!!		Dialogues	Yes	
2009	Luck by Chance			Yes	
2010	Karthik Calling Karthik			Yes	
2011	Game		Dialogues	Yes	
2011	Zindagi Na Milegi Dobara		Dialogues	Yes	
2011	Don 2	Yes	Yes	Yes	
2012	Talaash: The Answer Lies Within		Dialogues	Yes	
2013	Fukrey			Yes	
2015	Dil Dhadakne Do		Dialogues	Yes	
2015	Bangistan			Yes	
2016	Baar Baar Dekho			Yes	
2016	Rock On 2		Dialogues	Yes	
2017	Raees			Yes	
2017	Fukrey Returns			Yes	
2018	Gold			Yes	
2018	3 Storeys			Yes	
2019	Gully Boy			Yes	
2021	Toofaan			Yes	
2021	Hello Charlie			Yes	
2022	Sharmaji Namkeen			Yes	
2022	Phone Bhoot			Yes	
2023	Friday Night Plan			Yes	
2023	Fukrey 3			Yes	
2023	The Archies		Dialogues		
2023	Kho Gaye Hum Kahan			Yes	
2024	Madgaon Express			Yes	
2024	Boong			Yes	
2024	Yudhra		Dialogues	Yes	
2024	Agni			Yes	
2025	Superboys of Malegaon			Yes	
2025	Ground Zero			Yes	
2025	Songs of Paradise			Yes	
2025	120 Bahadur			Yes	
2026	Mirzapur (film)			Yes	Co-produced with Ritesh Sidhwani

=== Acting credits ===
Year	Title	Role	Notes
2008	Rock On!!	Aditya Shroff	
2009	Luck by Chance	Vikram Jaisingh	
2009	The Fakir of Venice	Adi	
2010	Karthik Calling Karthik	Karthik Narayan	
2011	Zindagi Na Milegi Dobara	Imran Qureshi	
2013	Bhaag Milkha Bhaag	Sardar Milkha Singh	
2014	Shaadi Ke Side Effects	Siddharth Roy	
2015	Dil Dhadakne Do	Sunny Gill	
2016	Wazir	Danish Ali	
2016	Rock On 2	Aditya Shroff	
2017	Daddy	Maqsood	Cameo appearance
2017	Lucknow Central	Kishan Mohan Girhotra	
2019	The Sky Is Pink	Niren Chaudhary	
2021	Toofaan	Aziz Ali	
2023	The Archies	Ben Andrews	Voiceover
2025	120 Bahadur	Major Shaitan Singh	
2028	The Beatles – A Four-Film Cinematic Event †	Ravi Shankar	Filming

=== Television ===
Year	Title	Role	Notes
2005	Nach Baliye	Judge	
2008–2009	Oye! It's Friday!	Host/presenter	
2015	I Can Do That	Host/presenter	
2017–present	Inside Edge	—N/a	Executive producer
2018–present	Mirzapur	—N/a	Executive producer
2019–present	Made in Heaven	—N/a	Executive producer
2019	Fukrey Boyzzz	—N/a	Executive producer
2022	Ms. Marvel	Waleed	Episode "Seeing Red"
2022	Eternally Confused and Eager for Love	—N/a	Executive producer
2023	Dahaad	—N/a	Executive producer
2023–present	Bambai Meri Jaan	—N/a	Executive producer
2024	Angry Young Men	Himself	
2025	The Roshans	Himself	
2025	Dabba Cartel	—N/a	Executive producer

== Discography ==
2019 – Echoes Album (Songs from the album)

- Rearview Mirror
- Seagull
- Solitary Childhood
- My Friend Who Was,
- Why Couldn't It Be Me?
- If Love Isn't Enough
- Pain Or Pleasure
- Bird On A Wire
- Be All You Can Be
- Let's Be Friends Again
- Don't Say It's The End
- Rearview Mirror- Ash Howes Mix
- Seagull- Ash Howes Mix

=== Playback singer ===
Year	Title	Song
2008	Rock On!!	
2008	Rock On!!	"Socha Hai"
2008	Rock On!!	"Pichle Saat Dinon Mein"
2008	Rock On!!	"Rock On!!"
2008	Rock On!!	"Tum Ho Toh"
2008	Rock On!!	"Sinbad The Sailor"
2011	Zindagi Na Milegi Dobara	
2011	Zindagi Na Milegi Dobara	"Señorita"
2011	Zindagi Na Milegi Dobara	"Toh Zinda Ho Tum"
2011	Zindagi Na Milegi Dobara	"Señorita" (Remix)
2014	Shaadi Ke Side Effects	"Yahaan Wahaan"
2014	Shaadi Ke Side Effects	"Bawla Sa Sapna"
2014	Shaadi Ke Side Effects	"Aahista Aahista"
2015	Dil Dhadakne Do	"Dil Dhadakne Do"
2015	Dil Dhadakne Do	"Gallan Goodiyan"
2016	Wazir	"Atrangi Yaari"
2016	Rock On 2	"Jaago"
2016	Rock On 2	"You Know What I Mean"
2016	Rock On 2	"Manzar Naya"
2016	Rock On 2	"Woh Jahaan"
2018	Bharat Ane Nenu	"I Don't Know"
