= List of accolades received by Rockstar (2011 film) =

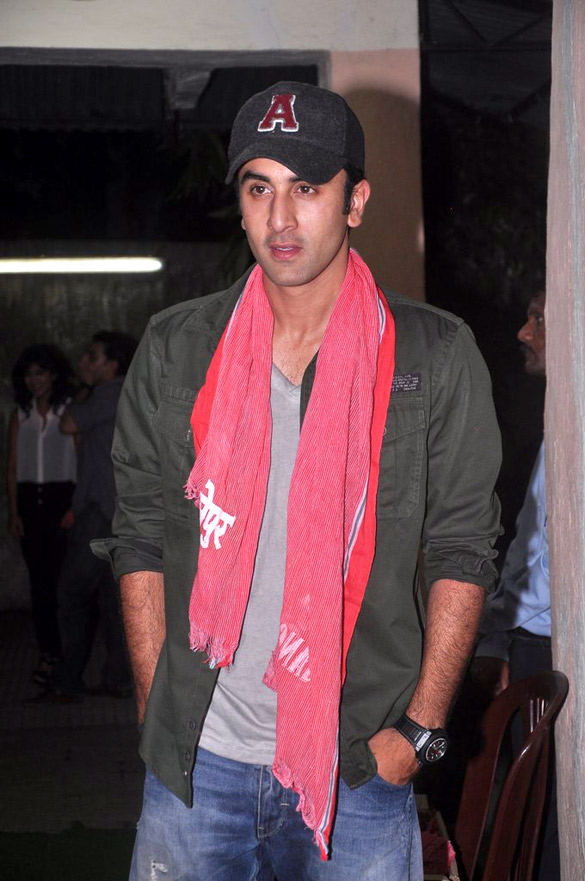
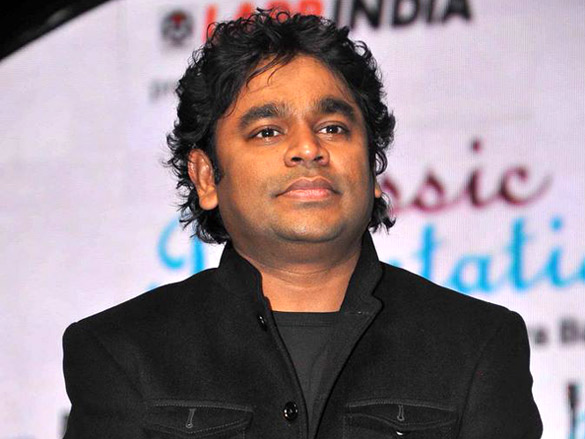
- Ranbir Kapoor's performance in acting and A. R. Rahman's music in Rockstar garnered them several awards and nominations respectively.
Accolades
Award	Wins	Nominations
Asian Film Awards	0	1
BIG Star Entertainment Awards	5	9
FICCI Frames Excellence Honours	4	4
Filmfare Awards	5	10
Global Indian Music Academy Awards	6	10
International Indian Film Academy Awards	6	10
Mirchi Music Awards	6	15
People's Choice Awards India	1	4
Producers Guild Film Awards	4	13
Screen Awards	3	9
Stardust Awards	0	3
Zee Cine Awards	7	9

Totals (Note: Certain award groups do not simply award one winner. They acknowledge several different recipients, have runners-up, and have third place. Since this is a specific recognition and is different from losing an award, runner-up mentions are considered wins in this award tally. For simplification and to avoid errors, each award in this list has been presumed to have had a prior nomination.)
- Wins: 47
- Nominations: 97

Rockstar is a 2011 Indian Hindi-language musical romantic drama film directed by Imtiaz Ali, starring Ranbir Kapoor and Nargis Fakhri, with music composed by A. R. Rahman. The film also stars Aditi Rao Hydari, Shernaz Patel and Kumud Mishra in supporting roles, and also Shammi Kapoor, who makes his last silver screen appearance. The film was produced by Eros International Ltd. along with Shree Ashtavinayak Cine Vision Ltd. It follows Janardhan Jakhar a.k.a. JJ or Jordan, who dreams of becoming a rockstar like his role model, Jim Morrison. Yet, eventually on attaining all that he dreamt of, Jordan ends up anguished and despondent, by the loss of Heer Kaul, whom he loved passionately and whose death is inadvertently caused by Jordan himself.

Produced on a budget of ₹600 million, Rockstar was released on 11 November 2011 and grossed ₹1.08 billion. The film albums was included in "Top Ten Best Hindi Film Albums of the Decade" by the Firstpost and the Film Companion. The film garnered awards and nominations in several categories, with particular praise for its direction, screenplay, Kapoor's performance, Rahman's music, cinematography, and editing. The film won 47 awards from 97 nominations.

== Awards and nominations ==
Award (Note: Awards, festivals and organizations are in Alphabetical order.)	Date of ceremony (Note: Date is linked to the article about the awards held that year, wherever possible.)	Category	Recipient(s)	Result	Ref.
Asian Film Awards	19 March 2012	Best Composer	A. R. Rahman	Nominated	
BIG Star Entertainment Awards	18 December 2011	Most Entertaining Film	Shree Ashtavinayak Cine Vision	Nominated	
BIG Star Entertainment Awards	18 December 2011	Most Entertaining Romantic Film	Shree Ashtavinayak Cine Vision	Nominated	
BIG Star Entertainment Awards	18 December 2011	Most Entertaining Director	Imtiaz Ali	Nominated	
BIG Star Entertainment Awards	18 December 2011	Best Actor of the Year	Ranbir Kapoor	Won	
BIG Star Entertainment Awards	18 December 2011	Most Entertaining Romantic Actor – Male	Ranbir Kapoor	Won	
BIG Star Entertainment Awards	18 December 2011	Most Entertaining Music	A. R. Rahman	Nominated	
BIG Star Entertainment Awards	18 December 2011	Most Entertaining Playback Singer – Male	Mohit Chauhan – ("Sadda Haq")	Won	
BIG Star Entertainment Awards	18 December 2011	Most Entertaining Song	"Sadda Haq" – A. R. Rahman	Won	
BIG Star Entertainment Awards	18 December 2011	Most Entertaining Playback Singer – Female	Harshdeep Kaur – ("Katiya Karoon")	Nominated	
FICCI Frames Excellence Honours	16-18 March 2012	Best Director	Imtiaz Ali	Won	
FICCI Frames Excellence Honours	16-18 March 2012	Best Actor	Ranbir Kapoor	Won	
FICCI Frames Excellence Honours	16-18 March 2012	Best Music Director	A. R. Rahman	Won	
FICCI Frames Excellence Honours	16-18 March 2012	Best Male Playback Singer	Mohit Chauhan	Won	
Filmfare Awards	29 January 2012	Best Film	Shree Ashtavinayak Cine Vision	Nominated	
Filmfare Awards	29 January 2012	Best Director	Imtiaz Ali	Nominated	
Filmfare Awards	29 January 2012	Best Actor	Ranbir Kapoor	Won	
Filmfare Awards	29 January 2012	Best Actor (Critics)	Ranbir Kapoor	Won	
Filmfare Awards	29 January 2012	Best Music Director	A. R. Rahman	Won	
Filmfare Awards	29 January 2012	Best Lyricist	Irshad Kamil – ("Nadaan Parindey")	Won	
Filmfare Awards	29 January 2012	Best Lyricist	Irshad Kamil – ("Sadda Haq")	Nominated	
Filmfare Awards	29 January 2012	Best Male Playback Singer	Mohit Chauhan – ("Jo Bhi Main")	Won	
Filmfare Awards	29 January 2012	Best Male Playback Singer	Mohit Chauhan – ("Sadda Haq")	Nominated	
Filmfare Awards	29 January 2012	Best Female Playback Singer	Harshdeep Kaur – ("Katiya Karoon")	Nominated	
Global Indian Music Academy Awards	1 October 2012	Best Film Album	Rockstar – A. R. Rahman	Won	
Global Indian Music Academy Awards	1 October 2012	Best Music Director	A. R. Rahman	Won	
Global Indian Music Academy Awards	1 October 2012	Best Background Score	A. R. Rahman	Won	
Global Indian Music Academy Awards	1 October 2012	Best Lyricst	Irshad Kamil – ("Nadaan Parindey")	Won	
Global Indian Music Academy Awards	1 October 2012	Best Male Playback Singer	A. R. Rahman, Javed Ali, Mohit Chauhan – ("Kun Faya Kun")	Won	
Global Indian Music Academy Awards	1 October 2012	Best Male Playback Singer	A. R. Rahman, Mohit Chauhan – ("Nadaan Parinde")	Nominated	
Global Indian Music Academy Awards	1 October 2012	Best Female Playback Singer	Harshdeep Kaur – ("Katiya Karoon")	Nominated	
Global Indian Music Academy Awards	1 October 2012	Best Film Song	"Nadaan Parinde"	Nominated	
Global Indian Music Academy Awards	1 October 2012	Best Music Arranger and Programmer	A. R. Rahman – ("Sadda Haq")	Nominated	
Global Indian Music Academy Awards	1 October 2012	Best Engineer – Film Album	P. A. Deepak, Hentry Kuruvilla, S.Sivakumar & T.R. Krishna Chetan	Won	
International Indian Film Academy Awards	7–9 June 2012	Best Film	Shree Ashtavinayak Cine Vision	Nominated	
International Indian Film Academy Awards	7–9 June 2012	Best Director	Imtiaz Ali	Nominated	
International Indian Film Academy Awards	7–9 June 2012	Best Story	Imtiaz Ali	Nominated	
International Indian Film Academy Awards	7–9 June 2012	Best Actor	Ranbir Kapoor	Won	
International Indian Film Academy Awards	7–9 June 2012	Hottest Pair Of The Year	Ranbir Kapoor & Nargis Fakhri	Won	
International Indian Film Academy Awards	7–9 June 2012	Best Music Director	A. R. Rahman	Won	
International Indian Film Academy Awards	7–9 June 2012	Best Background Score	A. R. Rahman	Won	
International Indian Film Academy Awards	7–9 June 2012	Best Lyricst	Irshad Kamil – ("Nadaan Parindey")	Won	
International Indian Film Academy Awards	7–9 June 2012	Best Male Playback Singer	Mohit Chauhan – ("Nadaan Parindey")	Won	
International Indian Film Academy Awards	7–9 June 2012	Best Female Playback Singer	Harshdeep Kaur – ("Katiya Karoon")	Nominated	
Mirchi Music Awards	21 March 2012	Album of The Year	A. R. Rahman, Irshad Kamil	Won	
Mirchi Music Awards	21 March 2012	Music Composer of The Year	A. R. Rahman – ("Nadaan Parindey")	Won	
Mirchi Music Awards	21 March 2012	Music Composer of The Year	A. R. Rahman – ("Sadda Haq")	Nominated	
Mirchi Music Awards	21 March 2012	Lyricist of The Year	Irshad Kamil – ("Nadaan Parindey")	Nominated	
Mirchi Music Awards	21 March 2012	Male Vocalist of The Year	Mohit Chauhan – ("Sadda Haq")	Nominated	
Mirchi Music Awards	21 March 2012	Male Vocalist of The Year	Mohit Chauhan – ("Nadaan Parindey")	Nominated	
Mirchi Music Awards	21 March 2012	Female Vocalist of The Year	Harshdeep Kaur – ("Katiya Karoon")	Nominated	
Mirchi Music Awards	21 March 2012	Upcoming Female Vocalist of The Year	Alma Ferovic – ("Aur Ho")	Nominated	
Mirchi Music Awards	21 March 2012	Song of The Year	"Nadaan Parinde"	Nominated	
Mirchi Music Awards	21 March 2012	Song of The Year	"Sadda Haq"	Nominated	
Mirchi Music Awards	21 March 2012	Song Representing Sufi Tradition	"Kun Faya Kun"	Won	
Mirchi Music Awards	21 March 2012	Best Song Recording	"Jo Bhi Main"	Nominated	
Mirchi Music Awards	21 March 2012	Listeners' Choice Song of the Year	"Nadaan Parinde"	Won	
Mirchi Music Awards	21 March 2012	Listeners' Choice Album of the Year	Rockstar	Won	
Mirchi Music Awards	11-12 March 2021	Album of the Decade	Rockstar	Won	
People's Choice Awards India	27 October 2012	Favourite Drama Movie	Rockstar - Shree Ashtavinayak Cine Vision	Won	
People's Choice Awards India	27 October 2012	Favourite Movie Actor	Ranbir Kapoor	Nominated	
People's Choice Awards India	27 October 2012	Favourite Movie Album of the Year	Rockstar - A. R. Rahman	Nominated	
People's Choice Awards India	27 October 2012	Favourite Male Singer	Mohit Chauhan – ("Sadda Haq")	Nominated	
Producers Guild Film Awards	25 January 2012	Best Film	Dhilin Mehta - Shree Ashtavinayak Cine Vision	Nominated	
Producers Guild Film Awards	25 January 2012	Best Director	Imtiaz Ali	Nominated	
Producers Guild Film Awards	25 January 2012	Best Screenplay	Imtiaz Ali	Nominated	
Producers Guild Film Awards	25 January 2012	Best Actor in a Leading Role	Ranbir Kapoor	Won	
Producers Guild Film Awards	25 January 2012	Best Actress in a Supporting Role	Aditi Rao Hydari	Nominated	
Producers Guild Film Awards	25 January 2012	Best Music Director	A. R. Rahman	Won	
Producers Guild Film Awards	25 January 2012	Best Lyricist	Irshad Kamil	Won	
Producers Guild Film Awards	25 January 2012	Best Male Playback Singer	Mohit Chauhan – ("Nadaan Parindey")	Won	
Producers Guild Film Awards	25 January 2012	Best Male Playback Singer	Mohit Chauhan – ("Sadda Haq")	Nominated	
Producers Guild Film Awards	25 January 2012	Best Female Playback Singer	Harshdeep Kaur – ("Katiya Karoon")	Nominated	
Producers Guild Film Awards	25 January 2012	Best Cinematography	Anil Mehta	Nominated	
Producers Guild Film Awards	25 January 2012	Best Sound Design	Dilip Subramanium	Nominated	
Producers Guild Film Awards	25 January 2012	Best Sound Mixing	Alok De & Dileep Subramanium	Nominated	
Screen Awards	15 January 2012	Best Actor	Ranbir Kapoor	Won	
Screen Awards	15 January 2012	Best Actor (Popular Choice)	Ranbir Kapoor	Nominated	
Screen Awards	15 January 2012	Best Music	A. R. Rahman	Won	
Screen Awards	15 January 2012	Best Male Playback Singer	Mohit Chauhan – ("Phir Se Udd Chala") & ("Sadda Haq")	Won	
Screen Awards	15 January 2012	Best Lyricist	Irshad Kamil – ("Nadaan Parindey")	Nominated	
Screen Awards	15 January 2012	Best Lyricist	Irshad Kamil – ("Sadda Haq")	Nominated	
Screen Awards	15 January 2012	Best Cinematography	Anil Mehta	Nominated	
Screen Awards	15 January 2012	Best Sound Design	Dilip Subramanium	Nominated	
Screen Awards	15 January 2012	Best Production Design	Arcopolis and Sumit Basu	Nominated	
Stardust Awards	26 February 2012	Best Actor in a Drama	Ranbir Kapoor	Nominated	
Stardust Awards	26 February 2012	Star Of The Year - Male	Ranbir Kapoor	Nominated	
Stardust Awards	26 February 2012	Superstar of Tomorrow – Female	Nargis Fakhri	Nominated	
Zee Cine Awards	22 January 2012	Best Film	Shree Ashtavinayak Cine Vision	Nominated	
Zee Cine Awards	22 January 2012	Best Director	Imtiaz Ali	Won	
Zee Cine Awards	22 January 2012	Best Screenplay	Imtiaz Ali	Won	
Zee Cine Awards	22 January 2012	Best Actor – Male	Ranbir Kapoor	Won	
Zee Cine Awards	22 January 2012	Best Music	A. R. Rahman	Won	
Zee Cine Awards	22 January 2012	Best Lyrics	Irshad Kamil – Rockstar	Won	
Zee Cine Awards	22 January 2012	Best Playback Singer – Male	Mohit Chauhan – ("Jo Bhi Main")	Won	
Zee Cine Awards	22 January 2012	Best Editing	Aarti Bajaj	Won	
Zee Cine Awards	22 January 2012	Best Song	"Sadda Haq"	Nominated	

== See also ==
- List of Bollywood films of 2011
