= Raees (soundtrack) =

- Soundtrack album cover

Soundtrack album by Ram Sampath, Kalyanji–Anandji and JAM8
- Released: 7 December 2016
- Genre: Feature film soundtrack, Bollywood music
- Length: 30:52
- Language: Hindi; Gujarati; Urdu
- Label: Zee Music Company
- Producer: Ram Sampath

Raees is a soundtrack album to the 2017 film of the same name, starring Shah Rukh Khan, Mahira Khan, and Nawazuddin Siddiqui, was released on 7 December 2016 by the music label Zee Music Company. The songs released on the original soundtrack are listed below. As of December 2020, the soundtrack has received more than 1.5 billion streams on YouTube.

== Release ==
The song "Laila Main Laila" from the 1980 film Qurbani was written by Indeevar, originally composed by Kalyanji–Anandji, and sung by Kanchan and Amit Kumar. The chorus has been recreated for the film by composer Ram Sampath. Additional lyrics are written by Javed Akhtar. The original Qurbani music video featured actress Zeenat Aman with Feroz Khan, while the Raees music video features Indian-Canadian actress Sunny Leone with Shah Rukh Khan.

"Saanson Ke" track is sung by Javed Ali in the film version. The song "Halka Halka" was removed from the film and the album because it didn't suit the film's script, but was later released after the film's theatrical release.

== Track listing ==
Original Motion Picture Soundtrack
No.	Title	Lyrics	Music	Singer(s)	Length
1.	"Laila Main Laila"	Indeevar, Javed Akhtar	Kalyanji–Anandji, Ram Sampath	Pawni Pandey	5:06
2.	"Zaalima"	Amitabh Bhattacharya	JAM8	Arijit Singh, Harshdeep Kaur	4:59
3.	"Udi Udi Jaye"	Javed Akhtar	Ram Sampath	Sukhwinder Singh, Bhoomi Trivedi, Karsan Das Sagathia	4:20
4.	"Dhingana"	Mayur Puri	JAM8 (Aheer), OmGrown	Mika Singh	2:46
5.	"Enu Naam Che Raees"	Ram Sampath, Hiral Brahmbhatt	Ram Sampath	Ram Sampath, Tarannum Malik	3:01
6.	"Saanson Ke"	Manoj Yadav	JAM8 (Aheer)	KK	4:03
7.	"Ghammar Ghammar"	Traditional	Ram Sampath	Roshan Rathod	2:39
8.	"Halka Halka" (Not used in the film)	Javed Akhtar; Monish Raza	Ram Sampath	Shreya Ghoshal, Sonu Nigam, Ram Sampath	3:58
Total length:					30:52
