= Harshdeep Kaur =

Indian singer (born 1986)

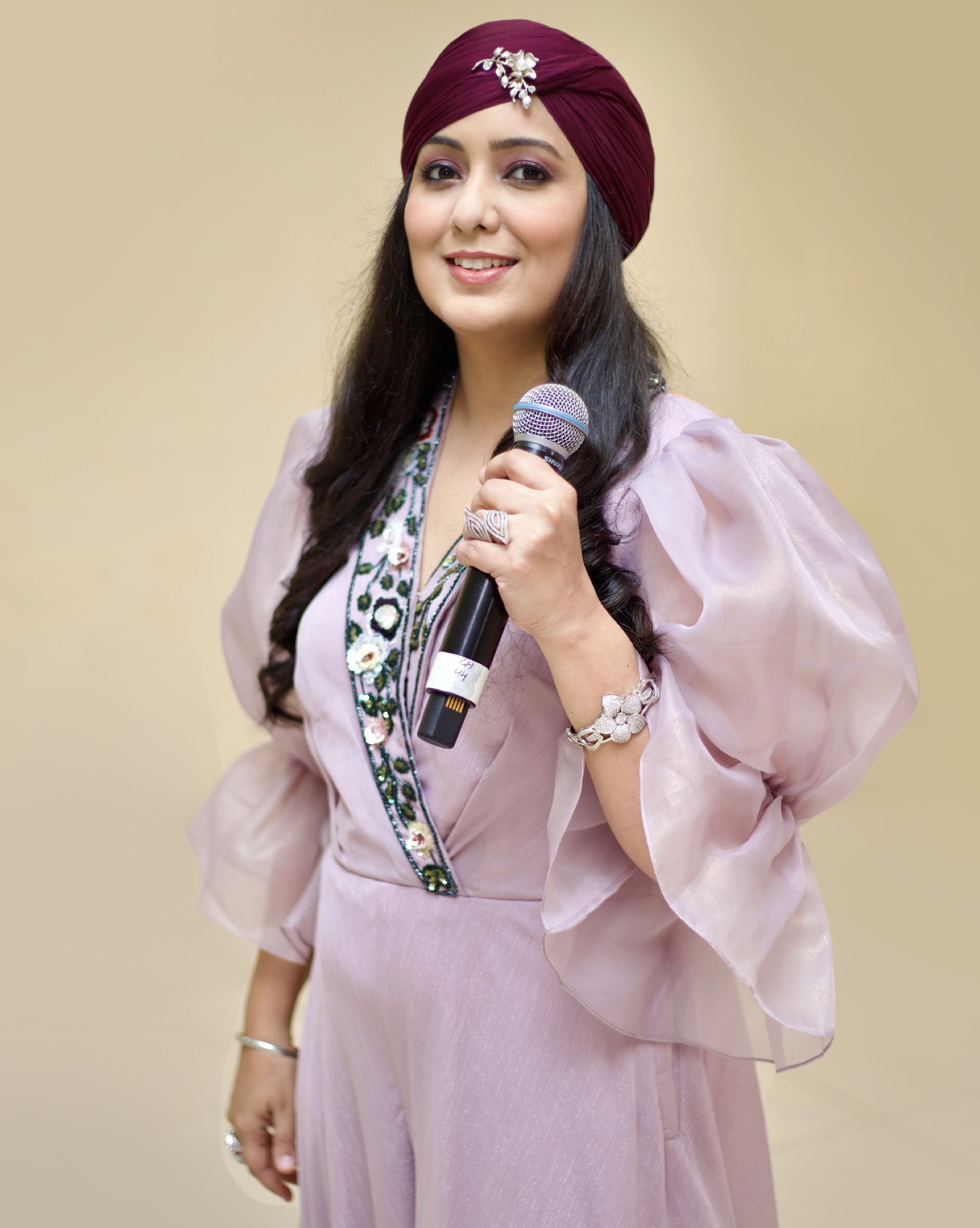
- Kaur in 2023
- Born: 16 December 1986 (age 39); Delhi, India
- Occupation: Singer
- Years active: 2003–present
- Spouse: Mankeet Singh (m. 2015)
- Children: 1
- Musical career
- Genres: Sufi, Bollywood

Harshdeep Kaur (born 16 December 1986) is an Indian playback singer known for her Bollywood Hindi, Punjabi, English and Sufi songs. She is popularly known as "Sufi Ki Sultana" because of her soulful Sufi renditions. After winning titles in two reality shows, Kaur established herself as a lead singer in Bollywood soundtracks. Kaur was sixteen years old when she released her first Bollywood song, "Sajna Mai Haari". Kaur is known to perform in a traditional Sufi attire, and a turban.

Kaur has recorded songs for film music in multiple Indian languages, including Hindi, Punjabi, Malayalam, Tamil and Urdu, and has established herself as a leading playback singer of Indian cinema. She has worked with leading music directors (including A R Rahman, Pritam Chakraborty, Vishal–Shekhar, Salim–Sulaiman, Shankar–Ehsaan–Loy, Amit Trivedi, Shantanu Moitra, Tanishk Bagchi, Himesh Reshammiya, Sanjay Leela Bhansali, Sohail Sen. She's one of the very few Indian singers to have sung for a Hollywood film. Her track R.I.P., composed by AR Rahman, was a part of Oscar-winning director Danny Boyle's film 127 Hours. She has also sung a few songs for the Pakistani film and television industry.

Some of her popular songs include "Katiya Karun" from Rockstar; "Dilbaro" from Raazi; "Heer" from Jab Tak Hai Jaan; "Ik Onkar" from Rang De Basanti; "Zaalima" from Raees; "Nachde Ne Saare" from Baar Baar Dekho; "Bari Barsi" from Band Baaja Baaraat; "Kabira" from Yeh Jawaani Hai Deewani; "Jugni Ji" from Cocktail; and "Twist Kamariya" from Bareilly Ki Barfi.

In 2019, Kaur received the IIFA Award for Best Female Playback Singer award at the 20th IIFA Awards for the song "Dilbaro" from the film Raazi. She also won the Star Screen Award, Zee Cine Award for the same song Dilbaro.

== Early life ==
Kaur was born on 16 December 1986 to Savinder Singh Sohal in Delhi. She is from a musical background. Her father, Savinder Singh Sohal, owns a factory of musical instruments. She attended Springdales School in New Delhi. Apart from studying, she started learning music at the age of six. She learned Indian classical music from Mr. Tejpal Singh, popularly known as the Singh Brothers, and Western classical music from George Pullinkala, Delhi Music Theatre. Later, at the age of twelve, to explore the world of music, she joined the Delhi School of Music to learn piano.

== Career ==
=== Television ===
Kaur won the singing competition MTV’s Video Ga Ga in 2003. In 2008 she won Junoon – Kuch Kar Dikhaane Ka. She competed from the Sufi Ki Sultan genre with Rahat Nusrat Fateh Ali Khan as her mentor.

She sang the title song of TV series Bani – Ishq Da Kalma in 2013. Kaur is the only singer who has appeared on all four seasons of Coke Studio (India) from 2011 to 2015.

Harshdeep Kaur became a judge on StarPlus singing reality show The Voice India. She was joined by Adnan Sami, Kanika Kapoor and Armaan Malik as the other coaches and by "Super Guru" A. R. Rahman.

== Personal life ==
Kaur married her childhood friend Mankeet Singh in a traditional Sikh wedding ceremony on 20 March 2015 in Mumbai. The couple's first child, Hunar Singh was born on 2 March 2021.

== Television appearances ==
- Coke Studio (India) on MTV:
  - Season 1 – Hoo (Music recreated by Leslie Lewis) in 2011
  - Season 2 – Nirmohiya (Music by Amit Trivedi) & Hey Ri (Music by Hitesh Sonik) in 2012
  - Season 3 – Dinae Dinae with Papon in 2013
  - Season 4 – Teriyan Tu Jaane (Amit Trivedi) in 2015
- As a judge on The Voice, a singing reality show on StarPlus in 2019. Her team won the reality show.
- The opening ceremony of IPL in 2017.
- Special performance at the Global Indian Music Academy Awards in 2016.
- MTV Unplugged: "Aaj Din Chadeya" with Pritam
- Featured multiple times on The Kapil Sharma Show

== Concerts and tours ==
| Year | Concerts and Tours | City(s) / Country(s) | Notes | Ref. |
|---|---|---|---|---|
| 2010 | A. R. Rahman Jai Ho Concert: The Journey Home World Tour | USA, Canada, UK, South Africa, & Singapore | | |
| 2011 | Rockstar Concert | India, London | Film promotional Concert | |

2013

- In April she headlined the Southbank Centre Music Festival in London, alongside Soul/Bollywood singer Ash King.
- In August she headlined the Mosaic Festival held in Mississauga, Canada.
- In September she performed at the London Mela in Gunnersbury Park.

2014

- AAS Concert at Purana Qila with Attaullah Khan.
- MTV Unplugged Concert with Shafqat Amanat Ali Khan
- Live in Concert with Pritam at Wembley Arena, London, Dubai & Singapore
- Infinite Love Concerts with AR Rahman in Singapore and Malaysia

2015

- Performed with her band at the Stardust Concert held at the Royal Festival Hall in London in September 2015

2016

- Performed at the Heart of Asia Conference held in Amritsar in the presence of Prime Minister Narendra Modi and other Asian leaders in 2016
- Hazaaron Khwahishein Aisi with Shekhar Ravjiani at The Esplanade in Singapore in September 2016

2017

- First Indian singer to become a headliner at the Manchester International Festival in June 2017.
- Headlined "Sounds Of Sufi" Concert at the Esplanade in Singapore in November 2017
- Leading performers of the AR Rahman Encore tour in India 2017
- Her Solo UK tour in March 2018 was a huge success and garnered a lot of appreciation from the music industry and her fans.
- She has performed with the Legendary Punjabi singer "Gurdas Mann" in 2015 & 2018 in New Delhi.

2018

- She was the leading performer on Pritam's First-ever North American Tour in April 2018.
- She opened for Bryan Adams' on his India tour on 12 October(Mumbai) and 14 October (Delhi) in 2018.
- Performed for Ranveer Singh & Deepika Padukone's Wedding in Lake Como, Italy.

2019

- Headlining performer at the "Jashn-e-Rekhta" Festival held in Delhi.
- Headlined Konark Festival in Orissa

== Discography ==
=== Film songs ===
| Year | Film(s) | No. | Song(s) | Co-artist(s) | Notes |
|---|---|---|---|---|---|
| 2003 | Aapko Pehle Bhi Kahin Dekha Hai | 1 | "Sajna Main Haari" | Nikhil–Vinay | |
| 2003 | Oops! | 2 | "Alag Alag" | Ravi Pawar | |
| 2003 | Oops! | 3 | "Uljal Baat Hai Duniya Ki" | | |
| 2005 | Karam | 4 | "Le Jaa" | Vishal Dadlani | |
| 2006 | Rang De Basanti | 5 | "Ik Onkar" | A. R. Rahman | |
| 2006 | Taxi No. 9211 | 6 | "Udne Do" | Vishal–Shekhar | |
| 2007 | 1971 | 7 | "Saajana" | Akash Sagar | |
| 2007 | 1971 | 8 | "Saajana" (Remix) | | |
| 2007 | Red: The Dark Side | 9 | "Dil Ne Ye Na Jaana" | Himesh Reshammiya | |
| 2008 | Halla Bol | 10 | "Is Pal Ki Soch" | | |
| 2008 | Karzzzz | 11 | "Lut Jaaon Lut Jaaon" | Himesh Reshammiya | |
| 2010 | Kajraare | 12 | "Aafreen" | Himesh Reshammiya | |
| 2010 | Kajraare | 13 | "Woh Lamha Phir Se Jeena Hai" | Himesh Reshammiya | |
| 2010 | Kajraare | 14 | "Woh Lamha Phir Se Jeena Hai" (Party Mix) | Himesh Reshammiya | |
| 2010 | Guzaarish | 15 | "Chaand Ki Katori" | | |
| 2010 | Band Baaja Baaraat | 16 | "Baari Barsi" | Labh Janjua, Salim Merchant | |
| 2010 | Khatta Meetha | 17 | "Sajde Kiye" (Film Version) | Roopkumar Rathod | |
| 2010 | Khatta Meetha | 18 | "Sajde Kiye" (Remix) | KK, Suzanne D'Mello | |
| 2011 | Desi Boyz | 19 | "Jhak Maar Ke" | Neeraj Shridhar | |
| 2011 | Desi Boyz | 20 | "Jhak Maar Ke" (Remix) | Neeraj Shridhar | |
| 2011 | Rockstar | 21 | "Katiya Karoon" | A.R. Rahman | |
| 2012 | Cinema Company | 22 | "Sonee Lagdee" | Alphons Joseph, Manjari | Malayalam film |
| 2012 | Cocktail | 23 | "Alif Allah (Jugni)" | Arif Lohar | |
| 2012 | Jab Tak Hai Jaan | 24 | "Heer" | A.R. Rahman | |
| 2012 | Khiladi 786 | 25 | "Tu Hoor Pari" | Javed Ali, Shreya Ghoshal, Chandrakala Singh | |
| 2012 | Luv Shuv Tey Chicken Khurana | 26 | "Luv Shuv Tey Chicken Khurana" | Shahid Mallya | |
| 2012 | Luv Shuv Tey Chicken Khurana | 27 | "Luni Hasi" (Female) | | |
| 2013 | Yeh Jawaani Hai Deewani | 28 | "Kabira" (Encore) | Arijit Singh | |
| 2013 | Phata Poster Nikhla Hero | 29 | "Mere Bina Tu" (Film Version) | Rahat Fateh Ali Khan | |
| 2014 | Ennathan Pesuvatho | 30 | "Nenje Nenje Nee" | | Tamil film |
| 2014 | Ennathan Pesuvatho | 31 | "Pennaga Pirathu" | Dhilip Varman | |
| 2014 | Dil Vil Pyaar Vyaar | 32 | "Saanu Te Aisa Mahi" | Sunidhi Chauhan | Punjabi film |
| 2014 | Punjab 1984 | 33 | "Rabb Meri Umar" (Lori) | | Punjabi film |
| 2014 | Pora Pove | 34 | "Nee Adugu Venaka" | | Telugu film |
| 2014 | Bang Bang! | 35 | "Uff" | Benny Dayal | |
| 2015 | Bin Roye | 36 | "Ballay Ballay" | Shiraz Uppal | Urdu film |
| 2015 | Prem Ratan Dhan Payo | 37 | "Jalte Diye" | Anweshaa, Shabab Sabri, Vinit Singh | |
| 2016 | Saadey CM Saab | 38 | "Mere Vich Teri" | Harbhajan Mann | Punjabi film |
| 2016 | 31st October | 39 | "Rabb De Bande" | | Punjabi film |
| 2016 | Sultan | 40 | "Sachi Muchi" | Mohit Chauhan | |
| 2016 | Happy Bhag Jayegi | 41 | "Happy Oye" | Shahid Mallya | |
| 2016 | Baar Baar Dekho | 42 | "Nachde Ne Saare" | Jasleen Royal, Siddharth Mahadevan | |
| 2016 | Parched | 43 | "Mai Ri Mai" | Neeti Mohan | |
| 2016 | Befikre | 44 | "Khulke Dulke" | Gippy Grewal | |
| 2017 | Raees | 45 | "Zaalima" | Arijit Singh | |
| 2017 | Irada | 46 | "Mahi" | Shabab Sabri | |
| 2017 | Flat 211 | 47 | "Tere Lams Ne" (Unplugged) | | |
| 2017 | Bareilly Ki Barfi | 48 | "Twist Kamariya" | Yasser Desai, Altamash Faridi | |
| 2018 | Hichki | 49 | "Oye Hichki" | | |
| 2018 | Hichki | 50 | "Soul of Hichki" | | |
| 2018 | Raazi | 51 | "Dilbaro" | Vibha Saraf, Shankar Mahadevan | |
| 2018 | Lashtam Pashtam | 52 | "Rab Rakha" | Sukhwinder Singh | |
| 2018 | Manmarziyaan | 53 | "Grey Walaa Shade" | Jazim Sharma | |
| 2018 | Manmarziyaan | 54 | "Chonch Ladhiyaan" | Jazim Sharma | |
| 2018 | Manmarziyaan | 55 | "Jaisi Teri Marzi" | Bhanu Pratap Singh | |
| 2018 | Happy Phirr Bhag Jayegi | 56 | "Happy Bhag Jayegi" | Daler Mehndi, Suvarna Tiwari | |
| 2019 | Ek Ladki Ko Dekha Toh Aisa Laga | 57 | "Gud Naal Ishq Mitha" | Navraj Hans | Composed by Rochak Kohli |
| 2019 | Parey Hut Love | 58 | "Ik Pal" | Hadiqa Kiani, Suhas Sawant | Urdu film |
| 2019 | Parey Hut Love | 59 | "Behka Na" | Ali Tariq | Urdu film |
| 2020 | Happy Hardy and Heer | 60 | "Ishqbaaziyaan" | Asees Kaur, Alamgir Khan, Jubin Nautiyal | |
| 2020 | Happy Hardy and Heer | 61 | "Le Jaana" | Asees Kaur, Himesh Reshammiya, Navraj Hans | |
| 2020 | Bhangra Paa Le | 62 | "Sacchiyaan" | Amit Mishra | |
| 2020 | Panga | 63 | "Le Panga" | Divya Kumar, Siddharth Mahadevan | |
| 2020 | Tanhaji | 64 | "Tinak Tinak" | | |
| 2020 | Jawaani Jaaneman | 65 | "Mere Baabula" (Madhaniyaa) | Akhil Sachdeva | |
| 2022 | Bal Naren | 66 | "Ram Ji Aayenge" | Manish S | |
| 2025 | Love in Vietnam | 67 | "Burrah Burrah" | Meet Bros, Malkit Singh, Ninja | |

=== Other songs ===
| Year | No. | Album(s) / TV Show(s) | Song | Notes |
|---|---|---|---|---|
| 2010 | 1 | Channel Divya | "Barse Channel Divya" (Theme Song 1) | |
| 2013 | 2 | Bani – Ishq Da Kalma | "Saaiyaan" | TV show |
| 2013 | 3 | Mohabat Subh Ka Sitara Hai | "Ye Jo Subha Ka Ik Sitara Hai" | Pakistani TV Show |
| 2015 | 4 | —N/a | "Jutti Kasuri" | Punjabi Folk (Single) |
| 2015 | 5 | Save the Girl Child | "Nanak di Soch" | Single |
| 2016 | 6 | —N/a | "Saaun Da Mahina" | Tribute to Jagjit Singh |
| 2016 | 7 | Shabad | "Lakh Khushiyaan" | |
| 2016 | 8 | Shabad | "Nanak Naam Mile" | |
| 2016 | 9 | Strumm Sufi Album | "Wali Allah" | |
| 2016 | 10 | Educate the Girl Child Anthem | "School ki Ghanti" | For Nestle |
| 2016 | 11 | 100 Days | "Joban Madhuban" | TV show |
| 2016 | 12 | Ek Shringaar-Swabhiman | "Ek Shringaar Swabhimaan" | TV show |
| 2016 | 13 | MTV Unplugged | "Aaj Din Chadeya" | with Pritam |
| 2016 | 14 | 350th Birth Anniversary of Guru Gobind Singh | "Guru Gobind Singh Ji" | |
| 2017 | 15 | 350th Birth Anniversary of Guru Gobind Singh | "Waho Waho Gobind Singh" | |
| 2017 | 16 | Social Song | "Hawa Badlo Anthem" | Campaign against Air Pollution |
| 2017 | 17 | Collaboration | "Lovers Quest Medley 5" | |
| 2017 | 18 | Single | "Dil Di Reejh" | Punjabi Single |
| 2017 | 19 | T Series Mixtapes | "Ehna Akhiyaan / Yaar Mangeya Si" | |
| 2017 | 20 | Simran for meditation | "Satnam Waheguru Ji" | Guru Nanak Jayanti Special |
| 2018 | 21 | T Series Mixtapes Punjabi | "Chhalla / Ni Mai Kamli" | |
| 2018 | 22 | Single | "Chamba Kitni Duur" | Himachali Folk Song (Single) |
| 2018 | 23 | Song for Virushka | "Peer Vi Tu" | Wedding Song of Virat Kohli and Anushka Sharma |
| 2018 | 24 | Shabad | "Satguru Nanak Aaye Ne" | 550 years of Guru Nanak Jayanti Special |
| 2020 | 25 | Prayer | "Taati Vaao Na Lagai" | |
| 2020 | 26 | Prayer | "Chaupai Sahib" | Prayer written by Guru Gobind Singh |
| 2020 | 27 | Title song | India Wali Ma | Sony TV |
| | 28 | Single | Pyaar Mileya | Single on her own music label |
| 2021 | 29 | Single | Behaal | |
| | 30 | Single | Jannat | Collaboration with UK Based artist Ezu |
| | 31 | Prayer | Tegh Bahadur Simriye | 400 years of Guru Tegh Bahadur Jayanti Special |
| | 32 | Bhoomi | Jallianwala | Released in Album Bhoomi by Salim Suleiman |
| 2022 | 33 | Himesh Ke Dil Se | "Tenu Pyyarr Kardaa" | Music Album |
| | 34 | Bhoomi | Koi Bole ram | Released in Album Bhoomi by Salim Suleiman |
| | 35 | Single | Ni Main Jaana | Featured at Times Square for Spotify Equal |
| | 36 | Prayer | Mere Maalik Ji | |
| | 37 | Single | Waah Sajna | Single on her own music label |
| | 38 | Prayer | Lakh Khushian Patshahian | |
| | 39 | Prayer | Purab Mubarak | |
| | 40 | Prayer | Jithe Jaaye Bahe Mera Satguru | |
| 2024 | 41 | Single | Bhala Sipahiya | Dogri Song |
| | 42 | Prayer | Naasro Mansoor Guru Gobind Singh | Released on her own music label |
| | 43 | Prayer | Ram Siya Ram | Released on the occasion of Ram Mandir opening at Ayodhya |
| | 44 | Single | O Sajna | Collaboration with Abhijit Vaghani |
| | 45 | Prayer | Anand Sahib | Released on her own music label |
| | 46 | Single | Yaar Banaaya Tennu | Collaboration with Kunaal Vermaa & Abhijit Vaghani |
| | 47 | Single | Dua | Collaboration with ShameerTandon and released on Zee Music |
| | 48 | Single | Pardesiya | Collaboration with Kanwar Grewal |
| | 49 | Single | Teri Ban Jaana | Released on Zee Music |

== Awards and nominations ==
| Year (Note: Refers to the year in which the ceremony was held.) | Award | Category | Film /Album | Song | Result | Ref. |
|---|---|---|---|---|---|---|
| 2011 | BIG Star Entertainment Awards | Most Entertaining Singer – Female | Rockstar | "Katiya Karoon" | Nominated | |
| 2012 | Filmfare Awards | Best Female Playback Singer | Rockstar | "Katiya Karoon" | Nominated | |
| 2012 | Global Indian Music Academy Awards | Best Female Playback Singer | Rockstar | "Katiya Karoon" | Nominated | |
| 2012 | International Indian Film Academy Awards | Best Female Playback Singer | Rockstar | "Katiya Karoon" | Nominated | |
| 2012 | Mirchi Music Awards | Female Vocalist of The Year | Rockstar | "Katiya Karoon" | Nominated | |
| 2012 | Producers Guild Film Awards | Best Female Playback Singer | Rockstar | "Katiya Karoon" | Nominated | |
| 2013 | Indian Television Academy Awards | Best Singer | Bani – Ishq Da Kalma | "Bani Ishq Da Kalma" | Won | |
| 2014 | Global Indian Music Academy Awards | Best Devotional Album | Ik On'kar | —N/a | Won | |
| 2015 | Mirchi Music Awards Punjab | Female Vocalist of The Year | Punjab 1984 | "Rabb Meri Umar" (Lori) | Nominated | |
| 2015 | PTC Punjabi Film Awards | Best Female Playback Singer | Punjab 1984 | "Rabb Meri Umar" (Lori) | Won | |
| 2016 | Lux Style Awards | Best Playback Singer - Female | Bin Roye | "Ballay Ballay" | Nominated | |
| 2018 | Zee Cine Awards | Song of the Year (Note: Shared with Co-Singer Arijit Singh and Composers JAM8.) | Raees | "Zaalima" | Nominated | |
| 2018 | Screen Awards | Best Female Playback Singer | Raazi | "Dilbaro" | Won | |
| 2019 | Filmfare Awards | Best Female Playback Singer (Note: Shared with Vibha Saraf for same song.) | Raazi | "Dilbaro" | Nominated | |
| 2019 | International Indian Film Academy Awards | Best Female Playback Singer | Raazi | "Dilbaro" | Won | |
| 2019 | Mirchi Music Awards | Female Vocalist of The Year | Raazi | "Dilbaro" | Nominated | |
| 2019 | Mirchi Music Awards | Song of The Year | Raazi | "Dilbaro" | Nominated | |
| 2019 | Reel Movie Awards | Best Female Playback Singer | Raazi | "Dilbaro" | Won | |
| 2019 | Zee Cine Awards | Best Playback Singer – Female | Raazi | "Dilbaro" | Won | |

=== Reality competitions ===
- Winner, MTV Video GaGa Contest (2001)
- Winner, NDTV Imagine's JUNOON Kuchh Kar Dikhane Ka (2008)
- Winner, Aao Jhoomein Gaayein (SAB TV)
- Winner, SAREGAMA Punjabi (Alpha TV)
