= Zaalima =

Song performed by Harshdeep Kaur and Arijit Singh

- Official song cover

Song by Arijit Singh and Harshdeep Kaur

from the album Raees
- Language: Hindi; Urdu
- Genre: Romantic Ballad; Indian pop; Filmi
- Composer: JAM8
- Lyricist: Amitabh Bhattacharya

Music video
- "Zaalima" on YouTube

"Zaalima" (transl. Oppressor) is an Indian song from the Hindi film Raees. The song is written by Amitabh Bhattacharya, composed by JAM8 and sung by Arijit Singh and Harshdeep Kaur. The music video of the song is picturised upon actors Shah Rukh Khan and Mahira Khan. The song was choreographed by Bosco-Caesar.

== Background ==
Actor Shah Rukh Khan shared multiple teasers of the song "Zaalima" on Twitter along with some lyrics before the full release of the song.

The female singer of the song Harshdeep Kaur informed to the Indian media in an interview, that the female pitch of the song had to be sounded different than the male pitch in the song.

She continued, "When I first heard "Zaalima," I knew this song would be a hit." It has a great recall value and is a very catchy song. We have never before heard the word "Zaalima" in a love song.

== Release ==
Upon its release within three days the song garnered over 20 million views.

As of October 2021, the song has more than 283 million views on YouTube official video, which makes it one of the most-streamed Bollywood songs on the platform.

== Critical reception ==
Bollywood Hungama's Joginder Tuteja in the review of the song Zaalima wrote, "Amitabh Bhattacharya's lyrics carry a mature flavour to them and the moment Arijit Singh starts rendering these words, 'Zaalima' goes to a different level altogether. Moreover, Harshdeep Kaur's voice is an added asset to this wonderful song that has in it to find running on a repeat mode after it has been heard once".

Times of India in its review of the song wrote "JAM8's 'Zaalima', showcases Shah Rukh Khan at his romantic best. The melody is striking, and Arijit Singh and Harshdeep Kaur stand out in the number, which gives the word zaalima (oppressor) a poetic twist".

== Personnel ==
The song credits mentioned in the official music video's description of the song Zaalima on YouTube are,

- JAM8 – music
- Amitabh Bhattacharya – lyrics
- Arijit Singh and Harshdeep Kaur – vocals
- DJ Phukan, Sunny M.R. – sound designers
- Sourav Roy, DJ Phukan, Sunny M.R. Rohan Chauhan, Arijit Singh – programmers
- Shadab Rayeen – Mixing and Mastering Engineer
- Abhishek Sortey – Assistant
- Ashwin Kulkarni – Shoot mix
- Ashwin Kulkarni, Himanshu Shirlekar, Aaroh Velankar, Kaushik Das – recording engineers
- Akashdeep Sengupta, Kaushik Da, Tushar Joshi – vocal conductor.
- Firoz Shaikh – harmonium
- Alan Hertz – drums
- Ernest Tibbs – bass
- Iqbal Azad – duff
- Pawan Rasaily and Arijit Singh – acoustic guitars
- Pawan Rasaily – electric guitars.

== Accolades ==
Year	Award Ceremony	Category	Recipient	Reference(s)
2017	MT20Jubilee Awards	Golden Disc	Amitabh Bhattacharya, JAM8, Arijit Singh and Harshdeep Kaur	
2017	24th Screen Awards	Best Male Playback	Arijit Singh	
2017	Tune India Radio Awards, Australia	Best Male Playback	Arijit Singh	
2017	Tune India Radio Awards, Australia	Best Song	Amitabh Bhattacharya, JAM8, Arijit Singh and Harshdeep Kaur	
2018	Zee Cine Awards	Best Lyricist	Amitabh Bhattacharya	
2018	10th Mirchi Music Awards	Upcoming Music Composer of The Year	JAM8	
