= Abdul Latif (gangster) =

Gujarat's Liquor Mafia

Abdul Lateef
- Born: Abdul Latif Khan; 24 October 1951; Kalupur, Ahmedabad, India
- Died: 29 November 1997 (aged 46); Naroda Patiya, Ahmedabad, Gujarat, India
- Cause of death: Encounter killing
- Occupations: Bootlegger, Mob Boss

Abdul Latif Khan (24 October 1951 – 29 November 1997) was an Indian gangster and bootlegger from the Gujarat state of India. He was also an associate of Dawood Ibrahim. He was considered Gujarat's most notorious criminal at the time.

He was based in Ahmedabad and was politically well connected. He used to wait on tables in gambling dens where he started serving liquor as a teenager. He became a bootlegger and eventually monopolised the illegal liquor business in Gujarat. Latif was wanted for over 100 cases of murder, contract killing, extortion, rioting, kidnappings, smuggling, bootlegging and was also wanted in the 1993 Mumbai blasts case. There were 243 cases against his gang including 64 murders and 14 kidnappings. The incident that highlighted Latif was the "Odhav Shootout". Latif wanted rival bootlegger Hansraj Trivedi to buy liquor from his gang. As Trivedi refused to be cowed down, Latif led two attacks on the gymkhana. In the second attack on 3 August 1992, automatic weapons, including sten guns and revolvers, were used.

He was the main culprit in supplying RDX used in the 1993 Mumbai blasts. He was arrested in 1995 in Delhi and housed at the Sabarmati jail pending trial. In November 1997, Latif was shot dead in a police encounter in Ahmedabad. In 2014, one of Latif's sons contested the assembly election with Samajwadi Party against Shanker Singh Vaghela, the former Chief Minister. Latif's other son had contested against Vaghela in 2009.

The 2017 Bollywood film Raees is said to be based on Latif's life. In April 2016, Latif's son filed a lawsuit for defamation against the makers of the film, saying the film misrepresented his father. Shaikh's lawyer said that the 97 cases lodged against Latif were for bootlegging and other serious offences under the Terrorist and Disruptive Activities (Prevention) Act, but he did not run a brothel or use women for delivery in his bootlegging operations, as depicted in the film. The film was declared to be a work of fiction.
