= Sadda Haq (song) =

Song by A.R. Rahman featuring Mohit Chauhan, Arpit Gupta

from the album Rockstar
- Released: 30 September 2011
- Recorded: Panchathan Hollywood Studio, Los Angeles
- Genre: Feature film soundtrack
- Length: 6:05
- Label: T-Series
- Songwriters: A. R. Rahman (composer); Irshad Kamil (lyricist)
- Producer: A. R. Rahman

Music video
- "Sadda Haq" on YouTube

"Sadda Haq" (transl. Our Right) is a song composed by A. R. Rahman for the 2011 Indian musical film Rockstar. The film stars Ranbir Kapoor and Nargis Fakhri in leading roles and is directed by Imtiaz Ali. The song features vocals by Mohit Chauhan and additional vocals by Clinton Cerejo and Arpit Gupta. The song also features Orianthi as a guitarist.

The hook, "sadda haq aithe rakh" is Punjabi for "give our right, right here (and right now)". MensXP placed the song 2nd on their list of the top 5 Hindi rock songs.

== Background ==
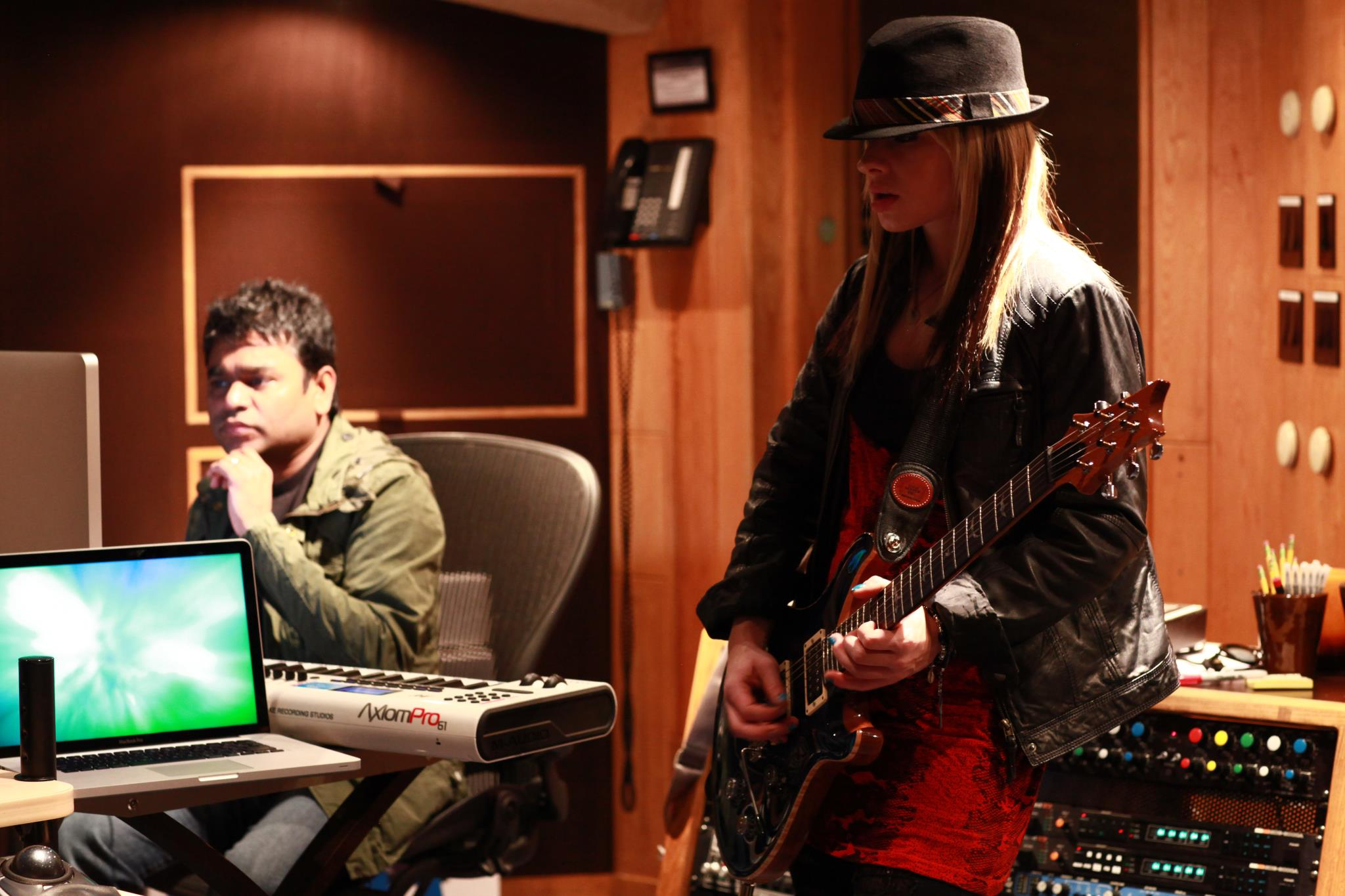
A.R.Rahman with Orianthi during the recording of Sadda Haq

According to Rahman, Rockstar is "a character driven film" and hence he had to make use of rock music and guitars. While working on "Sadda Haq", the team (Rahman, Imtiaz, Irshad Kamil and Mohit Chauhan) agreed that they needed a fantastic lead guitarist to justify the tempo and the lyrics of the song.

== Recording ==
Rahman recorded the song in his Los Angeles studio. Mohit Chauhan says, "I spent an entire day trying to record Sadda Haq with Rahman saab, and a sweet boy, Arpit Gupta, who helped me learn a rock tone. The next day, I did a take when he was yet to arrive and it sounded perfect."

== Music video ==
Ranbir Kapoor performing the song in the film.

The music video has Ranbir Kapoor performing in front of a live audience. The video was shot mainly at the Norbulingka monastery in McLeod Ganj, Dharamsala, Antonio De Souza High School in Mumbai and at Central Park in Connaught Place, Delhi, showcasing the band performing to a packed audience. A group of 200 performers from Shimla who had worked with Imtiaz Ali during the shoot of "Yeh Ishq Hai" from Jab We Met teamed up for Sadda Haq too. "While shooting for Rockstar in Dharamshala Antonio Desouza high school for a concert sequence for Sadda Haq, Imtiaz suggested calling the same group of performers from Shimla with whom he had worked during Jab We Met,” says a source from the production team."

Ranbir had travelled to Chennai and stayed with Rahman for a week in order to "feel the song imbibe and absorb it" so that when he finally performs it, the song would be an "extension of his personality."

== Reception ==
The song received immense critical praise. Mitesh Saraf of Planet Bollywood wrote, "It’s mad, it’s wild, and it’s strangely catchy, Sadda Haq, Aithe Rakh portrays the anguish and audacious Janardan (the protagonist of the movie, played by Ranbir Kapoor) in the movie and is no short of being an anthem in the coming days, especially in case of protests. It takes a bit (1.30 minutes) of time to set the mood and the high point comes in the form of some bold lyrics thrown at society with Mohit Chauhan in a never-heard before high pitched voice which leaves the listeners stunned. The highly energetic electric guitar (Kudos to Rahman for selecting Orianthi) and Drums (Ranjit Barot) provides an adrenalin rush and sweeps you off your feet."

"Sadda Haq" has since become a widely known protest anthem, being used in various protests and movements across the country.

== Accolades ==
Year	Award Ceremony	Category	Recipient	Result	Reference(s)
2011	Mirchi Music Awards	Song of the Year	-	Nominated	
2011	Mirchi Music Awards	Male Vocalist of The Year	Mohit Chauhan	Nominated	
2011	Mirchi Music Awards	Music Composer of The Year	A.R Rahman	Nominated	

== Controversies ==
Major parts of the song video were shot at the Norbulingka monastery in McLeod Ganj, Dharamsala. People waving the Free Tibet flag in the backdrop was shown in the song video. This triggered a dispute between Central Board of Film Certification and Imtiaz Ali when the Board ordered Ali to blur the flag and Free Tibet slogan before the film hit the theatre, but the director refused to do it. Imtiaz Ali said, "I am not concerned at all. I have been out of India for long and don’t know what's going on, but I don’t see anything controversial in the intention portrayal in the movie. The purpose of the movie is not to make any social message, it's more about personal freedom rather than a geographical issue." However, Ali had to remove the sequence from the video to get the film's censor done. Later an official from the Board revealed: "The Censor Board chief explained to them that all the cuts were made by the director voluntarily, and he had the option of appealing to a review board which he didn’t do. There were certain discussions between (Imtiaz) Ali and the Board regarding retaining a kiss between two actors (Ranbir and Nargis), but there have been no disagreement regarding deleting the flag from the frames." Deletion of the Tibetan flag from the video caused wide protests in Tibet, Dharamsala and Chennai.
