= FICCI Frames =

Indian film industry convention

- Status: Active
- Genre: Media and entertainment convention
- Venue: The Westin Mumbai, Powai Lake
- Location: Mumbai
- Country: India
- Inaugurated: 1999
- Most recent: 2024
- Attendance: Approx 5000
- Organizer: FICCI

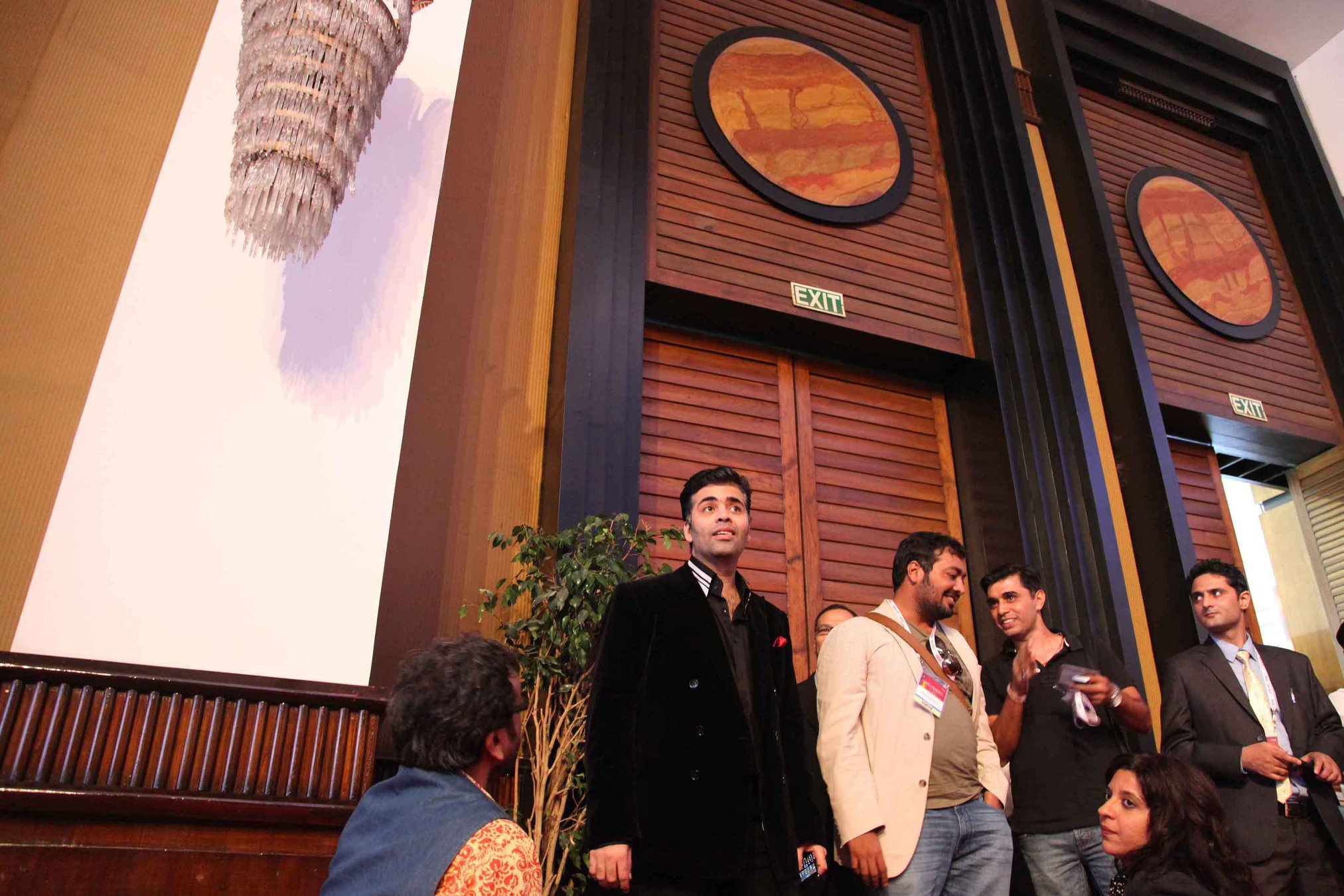
Karan Johar et al at FICCI Frames

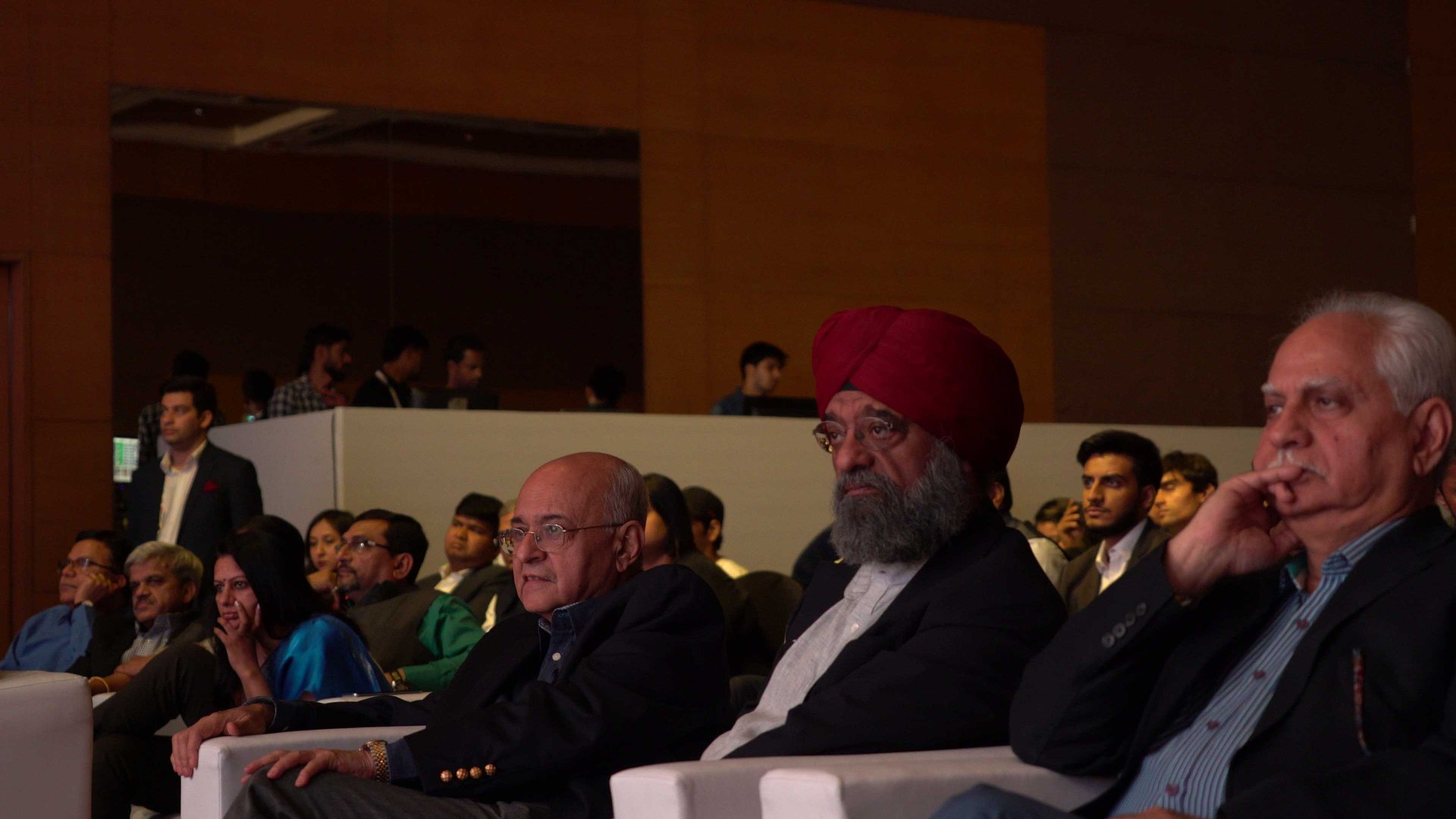
Amit Khanna et al at FICCI Frames

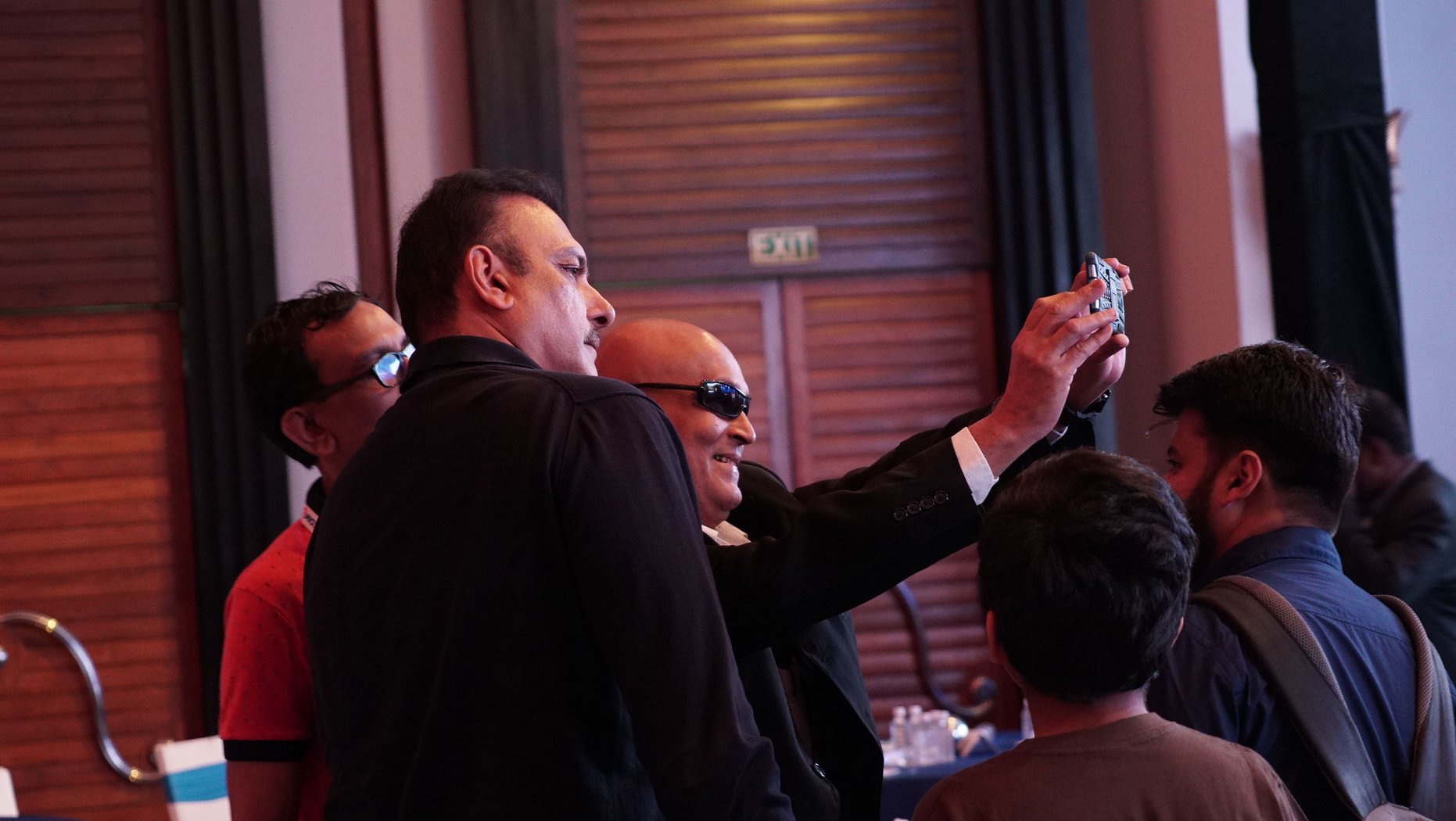
Ravi Shastri et al at FICCI Frames

FICCI Frames is an international convention of the Indian film industry, formerly chaired by Yash Chopra and co-chaired by Karan Johar. The convention is organised by the Federation of Indian Chambers of Commerce & Industry (FICCI).

== Programs ==
Activities at FICCI Frames include conference sessions, keynote addresses, masterclasses and workshops, policy roundtables, B2B meetings, exhibitions, cultural evenings, networking events, and the BAF Awards.

=== BAF Awards ===
==== Animation Category ====
- Animated Short Film - Student
- Animated Ad /Promo Film
- Animated Non-Feature
- Animated Film

==== Gaming Category ====
- Mobile & Tablet Game - Student
- Mobile & Tablet Game

==== VFX Category ====
- VFX - Student work
- VFX - Non-Feature
- VFX in a Film
- VFX Shot of the Year

== FICCI Frames Excellence Awards ==
=== Categories ===
==== Television ====
- Best TV Series (Non-Fiction)
- Best TV Series (Fiction)
- Best TV Actor (Male)
- Best TV Actor (Female)
- Best General Entertainment Channel

==== Films ====
- Best Director
- Best Actor
- Best Actress
- Best Music
- Best Debut Actor
- Best Debut Actress
- Best Debut Director
- FICCI Frames Excellence International Honour

== History ==
Dates	Venue	Guests
March 30–31, 2001		Vilasrao Deshmukh, Kunal Dasgupta, Kiran Karnik, Amit Baijal, Prasar Bharati, et al.
March 15–16, 2002	Renaissance Hotel; Renaissance Mumbai Convention Centre; Powai, Mumbai	Lata Mangeshkar, Dilip Kumar, Aishwarya Rai, et al.
March 7–9, 2003	Renaissance Hotel; Renaissance Mumbai Convention Centre; Powai, Mumbai	Sunir Kheterpal, et al.
March 2004	Renaissance Hotel; Renaissance Mumbai Convention Centre; Powai, Mumbai	Amitabh Bachchan, Hema Malini, et al.
April 5–6, 2005	Renaissance Hotel; Renaissance Mumbai Convention Centre; Powai, Mumbai	Daniel Glickman, Shah Rukh Khan, NR Narayana Murthy, et al.
March 22–24, 2006	Renaissance Hotel; Renaissance Mumbai Convention Centre; Powai, Mumbai	Vidya Balan, et al.
March 2007	Renaissance Hotel; Renaissance Mumbai Convention Centre; Powai, Mumbai	Shekhar Kapur, Farhan Akhtar, et al.
March 25–28, 2008	Renaissance Hotel; Renaissance Mumbai Convention Centre; Powai, Mumbai	Vidhu Vinod Chopra, Shimit Amin, Sudhir Mishra, et al.
February 17–19, 2009	Renaissance Hotel; Renaissance Mumbai Convention Centre; Powai, Mumbai	Gul Panag, Deepika Padukone, et al.
March 16–18, 2010	Renaissance Hotel; Renaissance Mumbai Convention Centre; Powai, Mumbai	Ashok Chavan, Katrina Kaif, James Nicholas Gianopulos, et al.
March 23–25, 2011	Renaissance Hotel; Renaissance Mumbai Convention Centre; Powai, Mumbai	James Murdoch, Kamal Haasan, et al.
March 14–16, 2012	Renaissance Hotel; Renaissance Mumbai Convention Centre; Powai, Mumbai	Chris Dodd, Prithviraj Chavan, Uday Shankar, et al.
March 11–13, 2013	Renaissance Hotel; Renaissance Mumbai Convention Centre; Powai, Mumbai	Andy Bird, Graham Broadbent, David Womark, et al.
March 12–14, 2014	Renaissance Hotel; Renaissance Mumbai Convention Centre; Powai, Mumbai	Sonam Kapoor, Patrick Suckling, et al.
March 25–27, 2015	Renaissance Hotel; Renaissance Mumbai Convention Centre; Powai, Mumbai	Arjun Kapoor, Ayushmann Khurrana, Bhumi Pednekar, et al.
March 30–April 1, 2016	Renaissance Hotel; Renaissance Mumbai Convention Centre; Powai, Mumbai	Mukesh Ambani, et al.
March 21–23, 2017	Renaissance Hotel; Renaissance Mumbai Convention Centre; Powai, Mumbai	Madhuri Dixit, Greg Daniels, Deepa Mehta, et al.
March 5–7, 2018	Grand Hyatt Mumbai; Business Centre; Santa Cruz, Mumbai	Ramesh Sippy, Sudhanshu Vats, et al.
March 12–14, 2019	Grand Hyatt Mumbai; Business Centre; Santa Cruz, Mumbai	Juhi Chaturvedi, Shilpa Shetty, et al.
Postponed due to the COVID-19 pandemic	Grand Hyatt Mumbai; Business Centre; Santa Cruz, Mumbai	

== See also ==
- List of anime conventions
- List of gaming conventions
- List of comic book conventions
- List of multigenre conventions
