= JAM8 =

- Genres: Pop; Dance; Sound design; Composing; Soundtrack
- Years active: 2016–present
- Labels: T-Series; Sony Music (South); Tips; SVF Music; Zee Music

JAM8 is a musical platform founded by Indian music composer/director Pritam. The platform provides facilities up and coming musicians. Pritam and his team supervise the young talent and some artists become part of Pritam's musical projects.

== History ==
On 9 April 2016, music composer and director Pritam announced JAM8 on Twitter. He wrote: "Just announced J.A.M 8 (Just About Music) with Kaushik-Akash, who are the first artists of my A&R Music Production platform."

Their first work in mainstream Indian music was the 1920 London soundtrack, which released in 2016. They were one of the composers for the soundtrack of the film Raees in 2017. Their composition "Zaalima" was a huge hit from this album. They continued their works in Bollywood composing for the films like Behen Hogi Teri, Raabta, Shaadi Mein Zaroor Aana, Race 3, Loveratri and recent films like 14 Phere and Helmet. They also worked in Telugu film Touch Chesi Chudu and Bengali films like Crisscross, Villain.

In June 2022, they launched their first non-soundtrack album under the name "Roposo JamRoom" by collaborating with 19 Indian background singers and 12 selected composers mentored by Pritam under Sony Music India label.

== Discography ==
=== Soundtracks ===
==== Hindi Soundtracks ====
Denotes films that have not yet been released

Year	Film	Song	Singer(s)	Lyrics	Other composer(s)/composer
2016	1920: London	"Gumnaam Hai Koi" Kaushik-Akash for JAM8	Jubin Nautiyal, Antara Mitra	Kunaal Verma	Along with Sharib-Toshi (debut film)
2016	1920: London	"Aafreen" Kaushik-Akash for JAM8	KK, Antara Mitra	Prashant Ingole	Along with Sharib-Toshi (debut film)
2016	1920: London	"Aafreen (2nd version)" Kaushik-Akash for JAM8	Sreeram, Antara Mitra	Prashant Ingole	Along with Sharib-Toshi (debut film)
2017	Raees	"Zaalima" KR Vaisakh	Arijit Singh, Harshdeep Kaur	Amitabh Bhattacharya	Along with Kalyanji–Anandji, Ram Sampath, OmGrown
2017	Raees	"Saanson Ke" Aheer for JAM8	KK	Manoj Yadav	Along with Kalyanji–Anandji, Ram Sampath, OmGrown
2017	Raees	"Saanson Ke (Reprise)" Aheer for JAM8	Javed Ali	Manoj Yadav	Along with Kalyanji–Anandji, Ram Sampath, OmGrown
2017	Raees	"Dhingana" Aheer for JAM8, OmGwrown	Mika Singh	Mayur Puri	Along with Kalyanji–Anandji, Ram Sampath, OmGrown
2017	Behen Hogi Teri	"Tera Hoke Rahoon" Kaushik-Akash-Guddu (KAG) for JAM8	Arijit Singh	Bipin Das	Along with Amjad-Nadeem, Jaidev Kumar, Yash Narvekar, Rishi Rich
2017	Raabta	"Lambiyaan Si Judaiyaan" KR Vaisakh	Arijit Singh, Shadab Faridi, Altamash Faridi	Amitabh Bhattacharya	Along with Pritam, Sohrabuddin, Sourav Roy, Meet Bros
2017	Raabta	"Darasal" KR Vaisakh	Atif Aslam	Irshad Kamil	Along with Pritam, Sohrabuddin, Sourav Roy, Meet Bros
2017	Shaadi Mein Zaroor Aana	"Main Hoon Saath Tere" Kaushik-Akash-Guddu (KAG) for JAM8	Arijit Singh	Shakeel Azmi, Kunaal Verma	Along with Arko, Zain-Saim-Raees, Rashid Khan, Anand Raj Anand, Vivek Kar
2017	Shaadi Mein Zaroor Aana	"Main Hoon Saath Tere (Shivangi Bhayana version)" Kaushik-Akash-Guddu (KAG) for JAM8	Shivangi Bhayana	Shakeel Azmi, Kunaal Verma	Along with Arko, Zain-Saim-Raees, Rashid Khan, Anand Raj Anand, Vivek Kar
2018	Race 3	"Allah Duhai Hai" Tushar Joshi and KR Vaisakh for JAM8	Amit Mishra, Sreerama, Jonita Gandhi, Raja Kumari	Shabbir Ahmed, Raja Kumari	Along with Pritam, Meet Bros, Vishal Mishra, Vicky Raja, Hardik Acharya, Shivay Vyas, Ali Jacko, Gurinder Seagal
2018	Loveyatri	"Loveyatri Title Track" Kaushik-Akash-Guddu (KAG) for JAM8	Divya Kumar, Harjot Kaur, Ana Rehman	Niren Bhatt	Along with Tanishk Bagchi, DJ Chetas-Lijo George
2018	Badhaai Ho	"Sajan Bade Senti" Kaushik-Akash-Guddu (KAG) for JAM8	Dev Negi, Harjot Kaur	Vayu	Along with Tanishk Bagchi, Rochak Kohli and Sunny Bawra-Inder Bawra
2020	Bhangra Paa Le	"Bhangra Paa Le Title Track" Shubham Shirule for JAM8	Mandy Gill	Mandy Gill	
2020	Bhangra Paa Le	"Jhoomer Dhaaga" Shubham Shirule for JAM8	Mandy Gill	Shubham Shirule, Mandy Gill	
2020	Bhangra Paa Le	"Re Sardar" Keeran for JAM8	Mandy Gill	Sholke Lal	
2020	Bhangra Paa Le	"Aaj Mere Yaar" Shubham Shirule and Ana Rehman for JAM8	Amit Mishra	Sholke Lal	
2020	Bhangra Paa Le	"Angana" Ana Rehman for JAM8	Javed Ali, Shreya Ghoshal	Sholke Lal	
2020	Bhangra Paa Le	"Peg Sheg" Nilotpal Munshi for JAM8	Jonita Gandhi, Akasa Singh, Shashwat Singh, A Bazz	Sholke Lal, A Bazz	Along with A Bazz
2020	Bhangra Paa Le	"Kala Joda" Akashdeep the for JAM8	Romy, Shalmali Kholgade, Manisha, Raftaar	Sholke Lal, Manisha, Raftaar	
2020	Bhangra Paa Le	"Raanjhan" Shubham Shirule for JAM8	Neeti Mohan, Tushar Joshi	Mandy Gill	
2020	Bhangra Paa Le	"Sacchiyan" Kaushik-Akash-Guddu (KAG) for JAM8	Amit Mishra, Harshdeep Kaur	Siddhant Kaushal	
2020	Bhangra Paa Le	"Ho Ja Rangeela Re" Shubham Shirule and Kiranee for JAM8	Shashwat Singh	Sholke Lal, Kiranee, Yash Narvekar	Along with Rishi Rich, Yash Narvekar
2020	Bhangra Paa Le	"Sun Sajna" Kiranee for JAM8	Navraj Hans, Jonita Gandhi, Yash Narvekar, Kiranee	Sholke Lal, Kiranee	Along with Rishi Rich, Yash Narvekar
2021	14 Phere	"Ram Sita" Mukund Suryavanshi for JAM8	Rekha Bhardwaj	Sholke Lal	Along with Rajeev V. Bhalla
2021	Helmet	"Mauka Mauka" Shubham Shirule for JAM8	Shubham Shirule	Sholke Lal	Along with Tanishk-Vayu, Tony Kakkar, Nirmaan
2021	Sooryavanshi	"Mere Yaara" Kaushik-Akash-Guddu (KAG) for JAM8	Arijit Singh, Neeti Mohan	Rashmi Virag	Along with Tanishk Bagchi, Dj chetas-Lijo George
2021	Sooryavanshi	"Mere Yaara - Female" Kaushik-Akash-Guddu (KAG) for JAM8	Neeti Mohan	Rashmi Virag	Along with Tanishk Bagchi, Dj chetas-Lijo George
2021	Velle	"Uddne Do"	Amit Mishra	Siddharth-Garima, Bipin Das	Rochak Kohli, Sohail Sen, Jasleen Royal, Yug Bhushal
2022	Ek Villain Returns	"Dil" Kaushik-Guddu for JAM8	Raghav Chaitanya	Kunaal Vermaa	Ankit Tiwari, Tanishk Bagchi
2022	Ek Villain Returns	"Dil (Female)" Kaushik-Guddu for JAM8	Shreya Ghoshal	Kunaal Vermaa	Ankit Tiwari, Tanishk Bagchi
2023	Bawaal	"Dil Se Dil Tak" Akashdeep Sengupta for JAM8	Laqshay Kapoor, Akashdeep Sengupta, Suvarna Tiwari	Kausar Munir	Along with Mithoon, Tanishk Bagchi
2023	Yaariyan 2	Background Music	JAM8	Instrumental	Manan Bhardwaj, Yo Yo Honey Singh, Khaalif
2023	Animal	"Hua Main" Along with Pritam	Raghav Chaitanya, Pritam	Manoj Muntashir	Pritam, Vishal Mishra, Jaani, Manan Bhardwaj, Shreyas Puranik, Ashim Kemson, Harshavardhan Rameshwar, Bhupinder Babbal and Gurinder Seagal
2024	Indian Police Force (Web Series)	"Bariyaa Re" Akashdeep Sengupta for JAM8	Vishal Mishra	Siddhesh Patole	Along with DJ Chetas-Lijo George, Abhishek-Ananya
2024	Ae Watan Mere Watan	"Ae Watan Mere Watan" Akashdeep Sengupta for JAM8	Romy	Darab Farooqui	Along with Mukund Suryawanshi, Shashi Suman
2024	Ae Watan Mere Watan	"Ae Watan Mere Watan (Female)" Akashdeep Sengupta for JAM8	Neeti Mohan	Darab Farooqui	Along with Mukund Suryawanshi, Shashi Suman
2024	Ruslaan	TBA Akashdeep Sengupta for JAM8 (Dropped from the album)	TBA	TBA	Along with Vishal Mishra, Rajat Nagpal
2025	Sikandar	"Sikandar Naache" Along with Pritam	Amit Mishra, Akasa Singh, Siddhaant Miishhraa	Sameer Anjaan, Siddhaant Miishhraa	Along with Pritam
2025	The Bhootnii	"Rang Laga" Mukund Suryawanshi for JAM8	Mukund Suryawanshi	Vaishnavi Thakur, Akshay The One	Along with Shabbir Ahmed, Iconyk, UpsideDown, Shashi
2025	The Bhootnii	"Rang Laga (Ethereal)" Mukund Suryawanshi for JAM8	Sunidhi Chauhan	Vaishnavi Thakur, Akshay The One	Along with Shabbir Ahmed, Iconyk, UpsideDown, Shashi
2025	Ek Deewane Ki Deewaniyat	"Deewaniyat - Title Track" Kaushik-Guddu for JAM8	Vishal Mishra	Kunaal Vermaa	Along with Rajat Nagpal, Annkur R Pathakk, Rahul Mishra and Lilu George-DJ Chetas

==== Non-Hindi soundtracks ====
Denotes films that have not yet been released

Year	Film	Songs	Language	Singer(s)	Lyrics	Notes
2018	Touch Chesi Chudu	"Touch Chesi Chudu Title Song" Marc D Muse for JAM8	Telugu	Brijesh Shandilya, Sreeram	Chandra Bose	Debut film (Solo composer)
2018	Touch Chesi Chudu	"Raaye Raaye" Marc D Muse and KR Vaisakh for JAM8	Telugu	Nakash Aziz, Madhu Priya	Kasarla Shyam	Debut film (Solo composer)
2018	Touch Chesi Chudu	"Manasa" Kaushik-Akash-Guddu (KAG) and KR Vaisakh for JAM8	Telugu	Benny Dayal, Neeti Mohan	Rehman	Debut film (Solo composer)
2018	Touch Chesi Chudu	"Rang Barse" Kaushik-Akash-Guddu (KAG) and KR Vaisakh for JAM8	Telugu	Akashdeep Sengupta	Rehman	Debut film (Solo composer)
2018	Touch Chesi Chudu	"Pushpa" Ashish Pandit for JAM8	Telugu	Nakash Aziz, DJ Smash Guy	Rehman	Debut film (Solo composer)
2018	Crisscross	"Duniya" Subhadeep Mitra for JAM8	Bengali	Nikhita Gandhi	Smaranjit Chakraborty	Debut film (Solo composer)
2018	Crisscross	"Momer Shohor" Keeran for JAM8	Bengali	Tushar Joshi	Smaranjit Chakraborty	Debut film (Solo composer)
2018	Crisscross	"Aalo Chaya" Shubham Shirule for JAM8	Bengali	Armaan Malik	Smaranjit Chakraborty	Debut film (Solo composer)
2018	Crisscross	"Bari Phire Aye" Swastika & Sagnik for JAM8	Bengali	Nikhita Gandhi	Prasen (Prasenjit Mukherjee)	Debut film (Solo composer)
2018	Villain	"Bholey Baba" Subhadeep Mitra for JAM8	Bengali	Badshah and Nikhita Gandhi	Sanjeev Tiwari	Along with Amlan Chakraborty, Dev Sen
2018	Villain	"Shundori Komola" Subhadeep Mitra for JAM8	Bengali	Armaan Malik and Antara Mitra	Sanjeev Tiwari	Along with Amlan Chakraborty, Dev Sen
2023	Animal	"Ammayi"	Telugu	Raghav Chaitanya, Pritam	Anantha Sriram	Pritam, Vishal Mishra, Jaani, Manan Bhardwaj, Shreyas Puranik, Harshavardhan Rameshwar and Bhupinder Babbal
2023	Animal	"Nee Vaadi"	Tamil	Raghav Chaitanya, Pritam	Mohan Rajan	Pritam, Vishal Mishra, Jaani, Manan Bhardwaj, Shreyas Puranik, Harshavardhan Rameshwar and Bhupinder Babbal
2023	Animal	"Pennaale"	Malayalam	Raghav Chaitanya, Pritam	Mankombu Gopalakrishnan	Pritam, Vishal Mishra, Jaani, Manan Bhardwaj, Shreyas Puranik, Harshavardhan Rameshwar and Bhupinder Babbal
2023	Animal	"Oh Baale"	Kannada	Raghav Chaitanya, Pritam	Varadaraj Chikkaballapura	Pritam, Vishal Mishra, Jaani, Manan Bhardwaj, Shreyas Puranik, Harshavardhan Rameshwar and Bhupinder Babbal

==== Hindi music video ====
Denotes films that have not yet been released

Year	Album	Songs	Language	Singer(s)	Lyrics	Notes
2018	Lovely Accident	"Lovely Accident" Kaushik Akash Guddu (KAG) for JAM8	Hindi	Taposh, Harjot Kaur	Shloke Lal	Debut

==== Hindi non-film soundtracks ====
Year	Show	Songs	Singers	Lyrics	Member(s)
2016	Yeh Rishta Kya Kehlata Hai				
2018	Carvaan Lounge (Season 1)	Bheegi Bheegi Raaton Mein	Mouni Roy and Nakash Aziz		Shloke Lal
2022	Raposo Jamroom	Raah Dikha De	Asees Kaur and Mohit Chauhan	Shloke Lal	Shubham Shirule and Ana Rehman

== Overview ==
During the launch, Pritam said, “I had this plan long back, but could not execute it as I had no time and no one to manage it. Now, there is a team to do so, and I have some time to mentor them as I have limited assignments.”

“JAM8 is a platform for newcomer composers. We hunt for them from all corners and want to push their music into the mainstream, as the industry is open to multiple composers for a film now.” |}

== Accolades ==
Award Ceremony	Category	Nominated work	Result	Ref.(s)
10th Mirchi Music Awards	Album of The Year	Raabta	Nominated	
10th Mirchi Music Awards	Upcoming Music Composer of The Year	"Zaalima" from Raees	Won	
