= Rockstar (2011 film) =

2011 Indian Hindi film by Imtiaz Ali

- Theatrical release poster
- Directed by: Imtiaz Ali
- Written by: Imtiaz Ali
- Produced by: Sunil Lulla; Dhilin Mehta
- Starring: Ranbir Kapoor; Nargis Fakhri; Shammi Kapoor
- Cinematography: Anil Mehta
- Edited by: Aarti Bajaj
- Music by: A. R. Rahman
- Production companies: Eros International; Shree Ashtavinayak Cine Vision
- Distributed by: Eros International
- Release date: 11 November 2011
- Running time: 159 minutes
- Country: India
- Language: Hindi
- Budget: ₹60 crore
- Box office: ₹108.7 crore (initial run) ₹10−12 crore (re-release)

Rockstar is a 2011 Indian Hindi-language epic musical drama film written and directed by Imtiaz Ali on the basis of a story he jointly wrote with Muazzam Beg. Produced by Eros International and Shree Ashtavinayak Cine Vision Limited, the film marks the final and posthumous film appearance of veteran actor Shammi Kapoor after his demise, and stars Shammi's grandson Ranbir Kapoor and Nargis Fakhri in lead roles, with Kumud Mishra, Piyush Mishra, Shernaz Patel, Aditi Rao Hydari and Sanjana Sanghi in pivotal supporting roles, while Shammi appears in an extended cameo. The film's soundtrack and background score was composed by A. R. Rahman, with lyrics by Irshad Kamil.

Rockstar was released worldwide in theatres on 11 November 2011. On the day of release, Tibetans in Chennai and Kangra protested against the Central Board of Film Certification, which asked the film-makers to censor scenes featuring the Tibetan flag. Made on a budget of ₹600 million (US$6.2 million), the film grossed ₹1.08 billion (US$11 million) worldwide, emerging as one of the highest-grossing films of the year, majorly appealing to the young urban crowd. It received generally positive reviews, with high praise directed towards its novel concept, story, screenplay, dialogue, soundtrack and performances of the cast, with major praise for Kapoor's central performance.

A recipient of numerous accolades, Rockstar received 10 nominations at the 57th Filmfare Awards, including Best Film, Best Director (Ali) and Best Female Debut (Fakhri), and won 5 awards, including Best Actor (Kapoor) and Best Music Director (Rahman).

Over the years, the film has gone to achieve a cult following, and its soundtrack album has often been termed as the best music album of the decade. Due to popular demand, the film was re-released on 17 May 2024 in theatres and grossed over ₹10 crore (US$1.0 million)– ₹12 crore (US$1.2 million) Following the re-release of the film in 2024, it is currently the eleventh highest-grossing re-released Indian film.

== Plot ==
A large crowd gathers outside the Verona Arena in Italy to watch the performance of rockstar Jordan, who storms onto the stage in a fit of rage and starts strumming his guitar. A flashback reveals the story of Janardhan Jhakar aka JJ, a Jat boy from Delhi who studies at Hindu College and dreams of being a rockstar, for which he is often mocked. Khatana, the college's canteen owner, tells JJ that being an artist requires a life-altering heartbreak, and without it he won't be able to reach his idol Jim Morrison's status. While attending an event at St. Stephen's College, JJ watches the dance performance of a popular student Heer Kaul, and is told that she is the perfect heartbreaking machine. Remembering Khatana's words, he decides to propose to her but is humiliated, which he sees as the perfect method for enduring the heartbreak needed for stardom. But eventually, he becomes close friends with Heer.

Heer marries Jai in Kashmir, after which the couple moves to Prague. During this time, she develops feelings for JJ and coins the nickname "Jordan" for him. Meanwhile, JJ is thrown out by his brothers for allegedly stealing family money. He takes refuge for two months at the Nizamuddin Dargah, singing qawwalis, and then moves into Khatana's home. Ustaad Jameel Khan, a renowned classical musician, hears JJ's singing at the Dargah and prompts Dhingra, the owner of Platinum Records, to sign him. Sheena, a journalist, interviews JJ and tells him that Dhingra is sending artists to Prague for a Europe tour. JJ volunteers for the tour, hoping to reunite with Heer.

Heer, meanwhile, suffers from continuous health problems. She meets JJ in Prague and they reconnect, but when he tries to profess his love for her, she spurns him. Despite this, their relationship gets intimate. As soon as JJ's Prague tour is over, she leaves him. JJ tries to visit her one last time before departing but is arrested for trespassing. When deported back to India, he is overwhelmed by the attention he receives, and clashes with the media and the police, resulting in another arrest. The publicity makes Dhingra decide to release JJ's album, which does well and throws JJ into the limelight. When released from jail, JJ terminates his contract with Dhingra and embarks on a countrywide tour, finally morphing into "Jordan", the rockstar he had aspired to be. However, he turns bitter, arrogant, and lonely as time goes on yet remains a popular artist.

Heer's sister Mandy meets him during one of his concerts, asking him to help Heer, who has been diagnosed with bone marrow aplasia. Jordan's presence causes Heer to somewhat recover, and Jordan starts disregarding his obligations to spend more time with her. Khatana, now his manager, urges Heer to persuade Jordan to perform his concerts. On Heer's insistence, Jordan resumes his tours. Upon returning, Heer slips into a coma and is discovered to be pregnant with Jordan's child. When informed of her condition, Jordan leaves one of his shows midway and goes to her hospital bed. He tries to wake her up, but she remains unresponsive and eventually dies, leaving him in a permanent state of grief. The film cuts back to the concert in Verona, and while performing, Jordan sees a vision of a smiling Heer walking towards him.

== Cast ==
- Ranbir Kapoor as Janardhan Jhakar ("JJ")/Jordan
  - Mohit Chauhan as Jordan (singing voice)
- Nargis Fakhri as Heer Kaul
- Shammi Kapoor as Ustad Jameel Khan
- Kumud Mishra as Khatana
- Piyush Mishra as Satish Dhingra
- Shernaz Patel as Neena Kaul
- Aditi Rao Hydari as Sheena
- Sanjana Sanghi as Mandy Kaul, Heer's younger sister
- Moufid Aziz as Jai
- Aakash Dahiya as Jordan's friend
- Jaideep Ahlawat as Jordan's brother
- Shreya Narayan as Jordan's sister-in-law
- Nizami Bandhu as Qawwal from Nizamuddin Auliya Dargah

== Production ==
=== Casting ===
Ranbir Kapoor plays the male lead of Rockstar, with whom Eros International worked previously on Anjaana Anjaani (2010). His role of Jordan is loosely based on Imtiaz Ali's Jat friend, who lived in a small settlement in Pitam Pura. He had seen Kareena Kapoor's performance in his previous directorial Jab We Met (2007) and wanted to cast her in the film. However, the script required some romantic scenes between the leads. As Ranbir and Kareena happened to be cousins, this was touted as a problem. Moreover, the filmmakers did not want to replace Ranbir with any other actor as the character he portrayed was reportedly suitable only for him. They then made a joint decision to replace Kapoor with Nargis Fakhri, after initially approaching Sonam Kapoor and Diana Penty for the replacement. The film marked Shammi Kapoor's last appearance in a feature film; he died on 14 August 2011.

=== Filming ===
The shooting for Rockstar began in May 2010. A major part of the shooting took place in Kashmir at Kulgam, Kupwara, Pahalgam and Srinagar, while the last phase was shot in Delhi at places like the Kotla Mubarakpur, Nizamuddin Dargah, Greater Kailash, Munirka, Indira Gandhi International Airport, Amity School (deleted scenes), Connaught Place, Shri Ram College of Commerce, BL Kapoor Hospital, Rajendra Nagar, St. Stephen's College and Hindu College, which was Ali's alma mater.

Foreign sequences were shot at Wenceslas Square, Charles Bridge and the Old Town in parts of Prague and in Liberec (at Dr. Beneš Square, in front of the Liebieg Villa). The film was shot in reverse as the crew didn't want to break the continuity of Ranbir's hairstyle. The climax with long hair was shot first. Ranbir had to transform himself into a rockstar: he practised guitar at A. R. Rahman's studio in Chennai for many days, read Kurt Cobain's biography and familiarised himself with Jats.

Rockstar's costumes were designed by Aki Narula and Manish Malhotra, who dressed Ranbir in "small-town denim-and-sweater combination and later, Pathani-style kurtas with arm bands", thus completing the rockstar look. Nargis Fakhri, who plays the role of a Kashmiri Pandit girl, wore a traditional Kashmiri Pandit wedding outfit in the wedding scene, which included pheran, dejhoor (ear ornament) and taranga (head cap worn underneath the veil). This also marked the first time in Bollywood that a Kashmiri Pandit wedding was shown.

== Soundtrack ==
The music for the film is composed and scored by A. R. Rahman. This also marks the first Imtiaz Ali film since his debut Socha Na Tha (2005), to have the same composer for both film score and songs.

The soundtrack features 14 tracks, with all the songs' lyrics penned by Irshad Kamil. The recording of the album took place in Chennai, London and Mumbai. Mohit Chauhan had lent his voice for nine songs. The audio rights were bought by T-Series. Upon release on 30 September 2011, it received widespread critical acclaim. "Sadda Haq" became the most popular song of the album and was regarded as a "youth anthem".

== Release ==
Rockstar released on 11 November 2011 and saw a high advance opening at multiplexes closer to educational institutions. The film released in 2,500 screens, and saw cinema halls running 14 to 15 shows in a day. The DVD of the film was released by Eros Home Video. The television premiere of the film took place on Star Gold on 25 February 2012. The film has been streaming available on Eros Now and JioCinema.

The film was re-released on 17 May 2024 in theatres in India.

== Reception ==
=== Critical response ===
Rockstar received generally positive reviews, with high praise directed towards its novel concept, story, screenplay, dialogue, soundtrack and performances of the cast, with major praise for Kapoor's central performance.

Raja Sen of Rediff gave the film 4 stars out of 5 and wrote, "Rockstar is a simple, unspectacular tale, sometimes even predictable, but director Imtiaz Ali masterfully weaves in details that draw us in." Aniruddha Guha of DNA too gave the film 4 out of 5 saying that the film was "like an effective crescendo that leaves you wanting more." Nikhat Kazmi of The Times of India also gave the film 4 out of 5 and stated that "The highpoint of Rockstar is its high tension, high-on-passion romance between two unlikely people". Sukanya Verma of Rediff rated it 3.5 stars out of 5 and said, "Rockstar is flawed but fabulous." Mayank Shekhar of Hindustan Times also gave a rating of 3.5 out of 5 and noted "The canvas is wide like early Sanjay Leela Bhansali's; bird's view of the stunning bridge is very Mani Ratnam; witty, earthy dialogues are so Vishal Bhardwaj. Director Imitiaz Ali manages to retain a personal, auteur's touch in a genre vastly commercial, mainstream. This is a rare feat." Taran Adarsh of Bollywood Hungama gave the film 3 out of 5 stars, and said "On the whole, Rockstar does not live up to the confidence and expectations from the otherwise very skilled and accomplished filmmaker Imtiaz Ali." Hrithik Sharma of El Viaje Reviews included it in his select list of Bollywood classics and says that "Rockstar is a unique cocktail of 50% drama, 40% romance and 10% comedy. What stands out is the music by A. R. Rahman. Each song in the film is a masterpiece and fits very well into the plot. Cinematography is realistic but pre-possessing indeed. The film gets a 10 on 10 in this department. There are certain scenes in the film that may seem unrelated to the plot, but those would be the scenes that would stay with you longer." Rajeev Masand of CNN-IBN also gave 3 stars out of 5, commenting "Imtiaz Ali's Rockstar is a far-from-perfect film, but it has honesty and depth, which is mostly missing in Hindi films today."

Sumit Bhattacharya of Rediff gave a rating of 2.5 out of 5, saying that "Rockstar is what is called a one-time watch", and highlighted that the film "is more Devdas than The Doors". Saibal Chatterjee of NDTV too gave the film 2.5 out of 5 stars, and said "Rockstar has a Sufi soul. If only it had been set free and allowed to go the whole hog!" Kaveree Bamzai of India Today gave the film 2 out of 5 stars and said "A. R. Rahman's music is the soul of the film. What is missing is the spine, leaving just a jelly in place." Yahoo! gave the film 1 star out of 5, and said "Rockstar drives home an unscientific hypothesis that people who’ve endured sufferings/heartbreak etc will reach their creative best." A reviewer from Reuters commented that Kapoor and Rahman are the stars of the film while saying "Rockstar works on so many levels, but it fails miserably on so many more.". Anuj Kumar of The Hindu said "Imtiaz Ali's latest is yet another good-looking product where a promising new-age director fails to translate his thoughts into something convincing."

=== Controversy ===
Major parts of the song "Sadda Haq" were shot at the Norbulingka monastery in McLeod Ganj, Dharamsala and people waving the free Tibet flag in the backdrop were shown in the song video. This triggered a dispute between Central Board of Film Certification and Imtiaz Ali when the Board asked Ali to blur the flag before the film hit theatres, but the director refused to do it. Imtiaz Ali said, "I am not concerned at all. I have been out of India for long and don’t know what is going on, but I don’t see anything controversial in the intention portrayal in the movie. The purpose of the movie is not to make any social message, it is more about personal freedom rather than a geographical issue." However, he had to remove the sequence from the video to get the film's censor done. Later an official from the Board stated: "The Censor Board chief explained to them that all the cuts were made by the director voluntarily, and he had the option of appealing to a review board which he didn’t do. There were certain discussions between (Imtiaz) Ali and the Board regarding retaining a kiss between two actors (Kapoor and Fakhri), but there has been no disagreement regarding deleting the flag from the frames." The controversy sparked protests among the Tibetan diaspora in Dharamsala and Chennai. Later, television broadcasts blotted out a "Free Tibet" banner featured in the song.

== Box office ==
=== Domestic ===
Upon release, Rockstar had a strong opening. The film opened to a strong response at multiplexes with bookings averaging around 60–70%, and single screens witnessed a lower capacity at around 30–40%. It collected ₹100 million (US$1.0 million) nett on its opening day, thus becoming the second-highest opener in a non-festival season after Ready. The strong opening was attributed to the multiplexes across cities, the "star power" of Ranbir Kapoor as well as the youthful theme of the film. The film showed growth on Saturday by grossing ₹112.5 million (US$1.2 million) nett, therefore taking its two-day net total to ₹205 million (US$2.1 million). A similar growth was seen on Sunday, and hence the first weekend collection ended at ₹337.5 million (US$3.5 million) nett, the majority of which was collected from Mumbai, Pune, Delhi and Bangalore.

Rockstar opened well on Monday collecting around ₹57.5 million (US$600,000) nett, with 40% drop as compared to the first day collections, thus taking the four-day total to ₹390 million (US$4.0 million) nett. The film collection saw another noticeable fall on Tuesday as it collected around ₹42.5 million (US$440,000) nett, with five days collection totalling to ₹432.5 million (US$4.5 million) nett. At the end of first week, the film had a good collection by grossing ₹474.6 million (US$4.9 million) nett, though the film had found appreciation only with a small section of the audience. In the process, it was ranked ninth in the list of all-time first week domestic collections.

Rockstar grossed ₹25.0 million (US$260,000) nett on second Friday, with a 75% drop as compared to the first day. On Saturday, the film collected ₹32.5 million (US$340,000) nett, and ₹42.5 million (US$440,000) nett on Sunday, taking the second weekend collection totalled at ₹100 million (US$1.0 million), representing a 70% drop from its first weekend. As of ten days, the film had collected approximately ₹574.6 million (US$6.0 million) nett. Rockstar made ₹158.5 million (US$1.6 million) nett in the second week, declining by 67% and taking the two-week collection totalled at ₹633.1 million (US$6.6 million) nett. The film on week three managed to earn ₹29.6 million (US$310,000), and hence taking three weeks collections to ₹662.7 million (US$6.9 million). By the end of its fifth week, the film netted ₹686.15 million (US$7.1 million).

=== International ===
Rockstar managed to gross $3.3 million from all overseas markets overall and was termed as below the mark. The film collected £185,000 in the UK, $612,000 in North America, 370,000 in UAE, and $100,000 in Australia.

=== Re-release ===
The total gross collection stands at ₹10 crore (US$1.0 million).
