= Rockstar (soundtrack) =

Soundtrack album by A. R. Rahman
- Released: 30 September 2011
- Recorded: 2010–2011; Panchathan Record Inn and AM Studios, Chennai; A R Studios, Mumbai; Nirvana Studios, Mumbai; Panchathan Hollywood Studio, Los Angeles
- Genres: Feature film soundtrack, Indian conventional music, soft rock, sufi music, Gujarati folk, punjabi folk, qawwali
- Length: 1:06:21
- Languages: Hindi, Urdu
- Label: T-Series
- Producer: A. R. Rahman

A. R. Rahman chronology
127 Hours (2010)	Rockstar (2011)	Ekk Deewana Tha (2012)

Singles from Rockstar
- 1. "Sadda Haq" Released: 30 September 2011

Rockstar is the soundtrack album, composed by A. R. Rahman, to the 2011 Hindi musical film of the same name, directed by Imtiaz Ali, and starring Ranbir Kapoor and Nargis Fakhri in the lead roles. The lyrics for all the songs of the album were penned by Irshad Kamil. The film also stars Shammi Kapoor, who makes his last silver screen appearance in the film. The film is jointly produced by Shree Ashtavinayak Cine Vision Ltd and Eros International. The album features fourteen tracks, and was released on 30 September 2011 by T-Series to extremely positive critical reception and hysterical response from fans, grabbing nominations and numerous music awards held in the subsequent year. The entire album topped the iTunes world charts 2011 and continued its legacy until early 2012. The Indian Express has termed the film's soundtrack 'A Milestone for Bollywood'.

== Production ==
The music for the film is scored by A R Rahman replacing Imtiaz Ali's previous associate, Pritam. Mohit Chauhan has lent his voice for nine songs as the voice of the character Jordan (played by Ranbir Kapoor). In 2010, during the development of the album, Rahman stated, "Rockstar is a character driven film and as one can guess from the title, there will be lots of guitar". In 2010, several meetings of Ali and the lyricist Irshad Kamil brought into a phrase titled, "Words destroy what I have to say". The song (Jo Bhi Main) that brings out the dilemma of the protagonist. Kamil suggested the last two lines (In lafzon ke maayne jaaney kaun badalta hai, main kehta hoon kuch, aur matlab aur koi ho jaata hai) for the particular song. But Ali didn't accept the lines because the protagonist wasn't supposed to have this level of sophistication as he was not poetic. To make it sound like something that could come from character Jordan, Kamil toned down the original after a few more rounds of discussion the lines were "Jo Bhi Main Kehna Chaahoon Barbaad Kare Alfaaz Mere" in the soundtrack. Upon development of the vociferating words Sadda Haq, Kamil stated that the situation needed a politically charged number that Jordan performs before a surging crowd at the height of his artistic angst. The slogan was used by students during Kamil's college days in Punjab to protest against the administration's arbitrary announcement of exams. On writing lyrics of "Phir Se Udd Chala", the analogies, he stated on introduction of offtrack lines like "Banu Raavan, Jiyoon Mar Marke" ("I become Raavan by continuing to live each time I die"), "The line was a metaphor for character Jordan who like the demon Ravan from the mythology Ramayana, dies a number of times and yet goes on with his life and that is why I used the Ravan simile." As per Rahman two songs Jo Bhi Mein and Sadda Haq aspire to be in the tradition of song Satisfaction by The Rolling Stones and song Another Brick in the Wall by Pink Floyd. Further, he added, "Just like most rock songs stood for people's voices, here also the central character's cry relates to every one of us." In an interview with Mid-Day, he stated, "I consciously kept away from using distorted guitars and heavy snazzy music. But I have done it here in Rockstar. Plus most songs are acoustic." For the song Katiya Karun singer Harshdeep Kaur noted that the song was recorded at AR Studios, Powai, Mumbai. Rahman asked the translation of Katiya Karun lyrics to which she explained the meaning to him. The lyrics translate as, "I spin your cotton all night, the entire day is spent in this thought, I shall live and die for you, Be a spinning wheel O' my body." Rahman wanted it to be a very catchy number as it was going to be a fun song with Jordan and Heer (played by Nargis Fakhri) on the road. Rahman started composing and created the song right in front of the singer. Kaur stated that it wasn't a folk song, only the rhyme Katiya Karun belongs to a Punjabi folk content. A part of the song was shot at a discotheque and hence, Kamil put in subtle metaphor lyrics in the song lines translating, "I will spin your cotton all night long" that indirectly implied "I will be at your services all night", thus giving it an item song touch.

The soundtrack album is a musical journey that sails through ballads, Gujarati folk, Sufi music and gypsy notes from an unheard Czech tradition. Prior to composing sessions, Imtiaz Ali told A. R. Rahman about the lead character of the film, "I told him how Jordan, the protagonist is inarticulate, how he can express himself only through music, how his music is influenced by not only his situation but also by the music of the place he visits. So when Jordan is in Prague hanging about with gypsies, he imbibes their spirit and makes gypsy music. This is what Hawaa Hawaa is." Likewise, when Jordan is thrown out of his house in the film, he goes to Nizamuddin Dargah, spends time with the Qawwals, absorbs their music and plays with them. His journey wasn't only understanding music, but also about understanding life and so the song Kun Faya Kun was composed. Kun Faya Kun (an Arabic phrase which means 'be, and it is'), a qawwali, composer A. R. Rahman has dedicated to Sufi saint Nizamuddin Auliya. The track The Dichotomy of Fame, a shehnai-guitar instrumental jugalbandi, is picturised on the late Shammi Kapoor as a gloomy-looking shehnai player in the image of Ustad Bismillah Khan, jamming with Ranbir Kapoor. On the song Sadda Haq, the singer Mohit Chauhan quoted, "I spent an entire day trying to record Sadda Haq with Rahman saab. But couldn't get it right. The next day, I did a take when he was yet to arrive and it sounded perfect and then the final version was recorded." The music video of Sadda Haq, another track, has Ranbir Kapoor performing in front of a live audience. Kapoor had travelled to Chennai and stayed with Rahman for a week to "feel the song imbibe and absorb it" so that when he finally performs it, the song would be an "extension of his personality."

== Release ==
Professional ratings
Review scores
Source	Rating
Bollywood Hungama	3.5/5 stars
Mumbai Mirror	5/5 stars

=== Critical reception ===
Songs

The soundtrack met with rave reviews, with most critics citing it as the best album of 2011. The Indian Express called the album a "milestone" in the history of Bollywood music. In addition, many reviewers have hailed the track "Sadda Haq" as the "youth anthem of India". A review by Mumbai Mirror concluded, "Mohit shines through with his versatility, Irshad Kamil's lyrics make simplicity seem profound and Rahman shows who's the boss. Respect." The review hailed the album as the "album of the year" and as "one of A. R. Rahman's best Hindi scores." Nikhil Hemrajani Hindustan Times commented that, "It may come across as a surprise, but the music of this Imtiaz Ali film is nothing like its name suggests. However, Rockstar's music is in no hurry to get to its destination. Listen to it without a care for the world and you'll love it. Rahman's masterful control is evident in every aspect of the soundtrack, and once again reminds us why he's the country's most important composer. We won't be surprised to see this become a classic." CNN-IBN stated that the soundtrack too belongs completely to Rahman as his previous albums but he does not come very close to his real potential in 'Rockstar'. Joginder Tuteja of Bollywood Hungama gave the album 3.5 (out of 5) and stated, "Since there is immense curiosity and excitement to check out what Rockstar has to offer, the album can be expected to fly off the shelves/get downloaded in quick time. While initial sales would be impressive enough." Critic Baradwaj Rangan wrote, "Rahman, we have trained ourselves to be indulgent, even if we suspect that he is never going to give us an album that we take to instantly, and even if we fear that we are going to rush out in droves to purchase our copies of Rockstar duck only to register the initial response of bemusement." For Bloomberg TV India, Pratish Narayan stated, "So it's left to Rahman to redeem the movie with a soundtrack and score that is arguably his best and most diverse since "Dil Se.." more than a decade ago. Credit must also go to Mohit Chauhan, whose voice gives life to almost all the songs, ranging from catchy rock tunes and Indian folk music to soulful and dark sufi numbers and romantic ballads." Writing for Yahoo! News, critic Satyajit felt, "ROCKSTAR that will be ruling the audio stands and will be enjoying big shelf-life in months to come".

Background Score

Saibal Chatterjee at NDTV noted, "AR Rahman's outstandingly lively and eclectic musical score presents a wide range of sounds blended into a harmonious whole." Nikhat Kazmi of The Times of India reviewed the score as, "The music by AR Rahman are stuff classics are made of. Of course, Sadda Haq is the youth anthem by now, but there are so many beautiful tracks in the film, you get heady and stirred."Taran Adarsh for Bollywood Hungama writes, "Music maestro A.R. Rahman's music is scintillating. Rockstar must've been a challenge for Rahman to depict the emotional catharsis a rockstar undergoes and the tracks, I wish to add, aren't the typical Rahman numbers either." He added, "A captivating score by A. R. Rahman". At Daily News and Analysis, Aniruddha Guha wrote, "The music itself is a delight. Each AR Rahman number is lilting, and woven beautifully in the story, the high frequency of songs not hindering the storytelling but enhancing the experience. Lyricist Irshad Kamil does an outstanding job, penning words that reflect the lead character's state of mind and complement situations aptly." Raja Sen at Rediff stated, "It's remarkable how much narrative detail Ali leaves to the asides, to margin notes not underscored and overwhelmed by AR Rahman's grand, lovely soundtrack." The newspaper, The Telegraph claimed, "And no alfaaz is enough for Rahman. After a couple of disappointing Indian scores (Endhiran and Jhootha Hi Sahi), this is sublime stuff. And perhaps a tad autobiographical. The way Jordan finds soul and solace in the dargah must have been reminiscent of Rahman's own conversion of faith."Rajeev Masand was quoted saying, "AR Rahman's score serves as the spine of this enterprise, emerging expectedly as one of the film's biggest strengths."

=== Mini-concerts ===
Special mini-concerts were planned across cities including Delhi, Jalandhar, Ludhiana, Amritsar, Chandigarh, Pune, Kolkata, Jaipur, Lucknow, Nagpur, Indore and Bangalore. These concerts started from 19 October 2011 however A. R. Rahman was not the part of it. Rahman toured in support of Rockstar album only in London, Mumbai and Delhi. Ranbir Kapoor and Nargis Fakhri, as well as singer Mohit Chauhan, performed in mini-concerts planned by "Rockstar team".

=== Controversy ===
In the music CD of the album, lyricist Irshad Kamil's name had been left out on the album cover and on the inner pages. Instead, the CD has given prominent credit to poet Rumi, whose poem was sung by Ranbir Kapoor. In defense, Imtiaz Ali stated, "It is just a clerical error and sometimes it happens when things are not in our hands. Irshad is my only friend, who has been there with me from the start. In the next lot of the audio CDs, we are going to rectify this mistake." When the record label's head, Bhushan Kumar was questioned about the missing credit on the album cover, he claimed that it was producer's mistake. He added that the album covers were made by the publicity designer who must have forgotten about it. Also, T-Series doesn't have the control to change it.

Major parts of the song "Saadda Haq" were shot at the Norbulingka monastery in McLeod Ganj, Dharamsala and people waving the free Tibet flag in the backdrop were shown in the song video. This triggered a dispute between Central Board of Film Certification and Imtiaz Ali when the Board asked Ali to blur the flag before the film hit the theatre, but the director refused to do it. Imtiaz Ali said, "I am not concerned at all. I have been out of India for long and don't know whats going on, but I don't see anything controversial in the intention portrayal in the movie. The purpose of the movie is not to make any social message, its more about personal freedom rather than a geographical issue." However, he had to remove the sequence from the video to get the film's censor done. Later an official from the Board stated: "The Censor Board chief explained to them that all the cuts were made by the director voluntarily, and he had the option of appealing to a review board which he didn't do. There were certain discussions between (Imtiaz) Ali and the Board regarding retaining a kiss between two actors (Ranbir and Nargis), but there have been no disagreement regarding deleting the flag from the frames." The controversy sparked protests among the Tibetan diaspora in Dharamsala and Chennai. Later television broadcasts blotted out a "Free Tibet" banner featured in the song.

== Singing voices ==
Mohit Chauhan – Vocals
Mosque People – Choir
A.R. Rahman – Production and Occasional Vocals
Harshdeep Kaur – Vocals
Javed Ali – Vocals
Suzanne D'Mello – Vocals
Alma Ferovic – Vocals
Kavita Krishnamurthy – Vocals
Karthik – Vocals
Ranbir Kapoor(as Jordan) – Narration

== Track listing ==
The complete track listing of the soundtrack was released on 16 September 2011, on A. R. Rahman's official site. All lyrics were penned by Irshad Kamil.

No.	Title	Artist(s)	Length
1.	"Phir Se Udd Chala"	Mohit Chauhan	4:31
2.	"Jo Bhi Main"	Mohit Chauhan	4:35
3.	"Katiya Karoon"	Harshdeep Kaur (Additional Vocals: Sapna Awasthi)	3:59
4.	"Kun Faaya Kun (Raga Bhairavi)"	A. R. Rahman, Javed Ali, Mohit Chauhan, Nizami Bandhu	7:53
5.	"Aur Ho"	Mohit Chauhan, Alma Ferovic	5:35
6.	"Hawa Hawa"	Mohit Chauhan (Additional Vocals: Viviane Chaix, Tanvi Shah, SuVi, Shalini)	5:42
7.	"Tango For Taj" (Instrumental)		3:01
8.	"Tum Ko"	Kavita Krishnamurthy	5:48
9.	"Sadda Haq"	Mohit Chauhan, Orianthi (Guitars) (Choral Vocal Arrangements by Clinton Cerejo)	6:05
10.	"The Dichotomy of Fame" (Instrumental)	Balesh (Shehnai), Kabuli (Guitars)	2:04
11.	"Naadaan Parinde"	A. R. Rahman, Mohit Chauhan	6:26
12.	"Tum Ho"	Mohit Chauhan, Suzanne D'Mello	5:18
13.	"Sheher Mein"	Mohit Chauhan, Karthik	4:03
14.	"The Meeting Place" (Based on a poem by Rumi)	Ranbir Kapoor (Narration)	1:13
Total length:			1:06:21

== Awards ==
Distributor	Category	Recipient	Result
Asian Film Awards	Best Composer of the Year	A. R. Rahman	Nominated
International Indian Film Academy Awards	Best Background Score	A. R. Rahman	Won
International Indian Film Academy Awards	Best Music Director	A. R. Rahman	Won
International Indian Film Academy Awards	Best Male Playback Singer	Mohit Chauhanfor the song "Nadaan Parindey"	Won
International Indian Film Academy Awards	Best Lyricist	Irshad Kamilfor the song "Nadaan Parindey"	Won
International Indian Film Academy Awards	Best Playback Singer (Female)	Harshdeep Kaur	Nominated
Filmfare Awards	Best Music Director	A. R. Rahman	Won
Filmfare Awards	Best Lyricist	Irshad Kamil for the song "Nadaan Parindey"	Won
Filmfare Awards	Best Playback Singer (Male)	Mohit Chauhan for the song "Jo Bhi Main"	Won
Filmfare Awards	Best Lyricist	Irshad Kamil for the song "Sadda Haq"	Nominated
Filmfare Awards	Best Playback Singer (Male)	Mohit Chauhan for the song "Sadda Haq"	Nominated
Filmfare Awards	Best Playback Singer (Female)	Harshdeep Kaur for the song "Katiya Karoon"	Nominated
Star Screen Awards	Best Music Director	A. R. Rahman	Won
Star Screen Awards	Best Male Playback Singer	Mohit Chauhan for the song "Phir Se Udd Chala"	Won
Star Screen Awards	Best Lyricist	Irshad Kamil for the songs - "Sadda Haq"; Nadaan Parindey	Nominated
BIG Star Entertainment Awards	Most Entertaining Song	A. R. Rahman for the song "Sadda Haq"	Won
BIG Star Entertainment Awards	Most Entertaining Singer (Male)	Mohit Chauhan for the song "Sadda Haq"	Won
BIG Star Entertainment Awards	Most Entertaining Music	A. R. Rahman	Nominated
BIG Star Entertainment Awards	Most Entertaining Singer (Female)	Harshdeep Kaur, Sapna Awasthi for the song "Katiya Karoon"	Nominated
Mirchi Music Awards	Album of The Year	A. R. Rahman, Irshad Kamil	Won
Mirchi Music Awards	Music Composer of the Year	A. R. Rahman for the song "Nadaan Parindey"	Won
Mirchi Music Awards	Listeners Choice Album of the Year	A. R. Rahman, Irshad Kamil	Won
Mirchi Music Awards	Listeners Choice Song of the Year	A. R. Rahman, Mohit Chauhan for the song "Nadaan Parindey"	Won
Mirchi Music Awards	Song representing Sufi tradition	"Kun Faya Kun"	Won
Mirchi Music Awards	Song of The Year	"Nadaan Parinde"	Nominated
Mirchi Music Awards	Song of The Year	"Sadda Haq"	Nominated
Mirchi Music Awards	Male Vocalist of The Year	Mohit Chauhan for the song "Naadan Parindey"	Nominated
Mirchi Music Awards	Male Vocalist of The Year	Mohit Chauhan for the song "Sadda Haq"	Nominated
Mirchi Music Awards	Female Vocalist of The Year	Harshdeep Kaur & Sapna Awasthi for the song "Katiya Karun"	Nominated
Mirchi Music Awards	Music Composer of the Year	A. R. Rahman for the song "Sadda Haq"	Nominated
Mirchi Music Awards	Lyricist of The Year	Irshad Kamil for the song "Naadan Parindey"	Nominated
Mirchi Music Awards	Upcoming Female Vocalist of The Year	Alma Ferovic for the song "Aur Ho"	Nominated
Mirchi Music Awards	Best Song Recording	"Jo Bhi Main"	Nominated
Zee Cine Awards	Best Music Director	A. R. Rahman	Won
Zee Cine Awards	Best Lyricist	Irshad Kamil	Won
Zee Cine Awards	Best Playback Singer (Male)	Mohit Chauhan	Won
RMIM Puraskaar	Music Director of the Year	A. R. Rahman	Won
RMIM Puraskaar	Album of the Year – Rockstar	A. R. Rahman	Won
RMIM Puraskaar	Lyricist of the Year	Irshad Kamil	Won
RMIM Puraskaar	Song of the Year – "Kun Faaya Kun"	A. R. Rahman, Javed Ali, Mohit Chauhan	Won
RMIM Puraskaar	Best Composed & Arranged song – Kun Faaya Kun	A. R. Rahman	Won
RMIM Puraskaar	Best Written Song – "Kun Faaya Kun"	Irshad Kamil	Won
RMIM Puraskaar	Best Sung (Solo) Song – "Sadda Haq"	Mohit Chauhan	Won
RMIM Puraskaar	Best Sung (Group) Song – "Kun Faaya Kun"	A. R. Rahman, Javed Ali, Mohit Chauhan	Won
RMIM Puraskaar	Special Artist(s) Award (Satish Kalra Sammaan)	A. R. Rahman, Irshad Kamil, Mohit Chauhan, Javed Ali, Harshdeep Kaur, Karthik and Suzanne D'Mello	Won
Global Indian Music Awards	Best Lyricist	Irshad Kamil	Won
Global Indian Music Awards	Best Playback Singer – Male	A. R. Rahman, Javed Ali, Mohit Chauhan for the song "Kun Faayaa Kun"	Won
Global Indian Music Awards	Best Music Director	A. R. Rahman	Won
Global Indian Music Awards	Best Film Album – Rockstar	A. R. Rahman	Won
Global Indian Music Awards	Best Background Score	A. R. Rahman	Won
Global Indian Music Awards	Best Music Arranger and Programmer	A. R. Rahman for the song "Sadda Haq"	Nominated
Global Indian Music Awards	Best Film Song	Mohit Chauhan for the song "Sadda Haq"	Nominated
Global Indian Music Awards	Best Playback Singer	Harshdeep Kaur	Nominated
Global Indian Music Awards	Best Music Mix Engineer(s)	Hentry Kuruvilla, P.A. Deepak, S.Sivakumar, T.R. Krishna Chetan	Nominated
FICCI Frames Excellence Awards	Best Music Director	A. R. Rahman	Won
FICCI Frames Excellence Awards	Best Album of the Year (Listener's Choice)	A. R. Rahman	Won
FICCI Frames Excellence Awards	Best Song of the Year	A. R. Rahman, Mohit Chauhan for the song "Nadaan Parindey"	Won
FICCI Frames Excellence Awards	Best Song – Sufi Tradition	A. R. Rahman, Javed Ali, Mohit Chauhan for the song "Kun Faayaa Kun"	Won
FICCI Frames Excellence Awards	Best Album of the Year (Jury)	A. R. Rahman	Won

== Personnel ==
Credits adapted from A. R. Rahman's official website as well as original CD liner notes

Backing Vocals

Clinton Cerejo's session singers

Suzanne D'Mello's session singers: A. R. Reihana, Swetha Mohan, Prashanthini, Augustine Paul, Ebenezer Arunkumar, Rachel Tharian, Joel Thilagaraj, Cleona Abraham, Kalyani Nair, Nadisha Thomas, Harini Ramkumar, Priyadharshini, Deepa Mariam, Parveen Azad, Simran, Rumana Ali, Shagufta Jan, Shagufta Rehman, Srinidhi Venkatesh

Crowd chorus: Sumit Basu, Roysten Abel, Teddy Maurya, Abhishek Roy, Satish Raj, Ashima Chibber, Tanmai Rastogi, Anubhav Roy, Abhinandan Reddy, Pushpa Jain

Personnel

Song	Personnel
"Phir Se Ud Chala"	Mandolin: George Doering; Guitar: Randy Bernsen
"Aur Ho"	Flute: Naveen Iyer; Guitar: Keba Jeremiah
"Hawaa Hawaa"	Flute: Drums: Ranjit Barot; Violin: Ann Marie Simpson; Guitars & Dulcimer: George Doering; Mandolin: Seenu
"Tum ho"	Sarangi: Dilshad Khan; Tabla: Sai Sharavanam
"Sadda Haq"	Drums: Oscar Seaton
"Kun Faya Kun"	Guitar: Keba Jeremiah; Tabla: Neelkantan, Prasad
"Jo Bhi Main"	Guitar: Kabuli, Shon Pinto; Drums: Ranjit Barot
"Katiya Karun"	Guitar: Keba Jeremiah; Traditional string instruments: Gujarati Folk Musicians
"Sheher Mein"	Guitar: Keba Jeremiah; Bass guitar: Keith Peters; Percussion: Raja, Neelakantan, Bala, Veda, Lakshmi Narayanan, Raju

Production

- Producer: A. R. Rahman
- Mastering:
  - Louie Teran at Marcussen Mastering Studios, Los Angeles
  - Aditya Modi, R. Nitish Kumar at Premier Digital Mastering Studios, Mumbai
- Additional Recording: Tal Herzberg records Orianthi and Oscar Seaton for "Sadda Haq"
- Engineers:
  - Suresh Permal, Hentry Kuruvilla, T. R. Krishna Chetan, Srinidhi Venkatesh, Jerry Vincent, P. A. Deepak (at Panchathan Record Inn)
  - Abhinav Varma, Puneet Samtani (Nirvana Studios, Mumbai)
  - S. Sivakumar, K.J. Singh Kannan Ganpat, Pradeep, Kartikheyan (at A.M. Studios)
  - Tony Joy, Viviane Chaix (at Panchathan Hollywood Studios)
- String engineer: V.J. Srinivasamurthy
- Mixing: P. A. Deepak, S. Sivakumar, T. R. Krishna Chetan, Santoshi Noguchi, Hentry Kuruvilla
- Music co-ordinators: Noell James, T. M. Faizuddin
- Musicians' fixer: R. Samidurai
