= Delhi School of Music =

Coordinates: 28°36′04″N 77°11′20″E

- Established: 1966; 60 years ago
- President: Sunit Tandon
- Vice-president: Jayati Ghosh
- Head: Delhi Music Society
- Location: 8, Nyaya Marg, Chanakya Puri, New Delhi, New Delhi
- Campus: Urban

The Delhi School of Music, established by the Delhi Music Society, teaches Western classical music. It is the only institution of its kind in northern India. As of 2012, it had an enrolment of 850 children. Delhi School of Music offers lessons in western classical music It provides musical tuitions in instrumental (piano, guitar, violin, cello, clarinet, flute, recorder, saxophone, keyboard, drums) vocal and dance sections.

The school is a center for the examinations of the Associated Board of the Royal Schools of Music, England, as well as the Trinity College of Music, London. There is growing emphasis not just on individual performance but on ensemble playing, aural development and musical appreciation. The staff and students of the School hone their skills through workshops conducted by both visiting artistes and other musicians, which also provide musical interaction. There are periodic pupils concerts and other events, which help to develop the performance skills of the students.

== Mission ==
The Delhi Music Society is a voluntary, non-profit organisation devoted to the dissemination and enjoyment of music, especially classical music (at present mainly Western). It was registered under the Societies Act in 1953, with the primary objectives described below:-

- to teach promote and encourage music and dance,
- to arrange concerts and recitals by visiting and local artistes, and
- to collaborate with other similar cultural organisations to encourage and develop among the musically inclined, an appreciation and understanding of western classical music.

The Society collaborates with institutions like the Indian Council for Cultural Relations, the India International Centre, and cultural divisions/organisations of various foreign missions. It also sponsors and presents concerts on its own. Networking with music societies in Pune, Mumbai, Goa, Kolkata and Bangalore, the Society has arranged all-India tours for visiting artistes. Many internationally reputed performers from all over the world have been presented by the Society. Increasingly the Society is trying to lay accent on more performances by local artistes.

The Society celebrated its Golden Jubilee in 2003-04 with a series of special concerts.

Attempts will continue to make live performances of music by first-rate artistes available to the general public in the city and to make our Society's premises a centre for western classical music activities in Delhi. In addition, lecture-demonstrations and workshops on various aspect of music as well as provision of a library-cum-listening facility for members are being planned.

== Management ==
The Society is governed by an Executive Committee consisting of fourteen members elected by the General Body every year, one of whom is selected by the elected members as their President. All the Executive Committee members are voluntary workers who devote time and energy for the love of music. A small secretariat headed by an Administrator functions at the premises of the Society to look after the day-to-day activities of the School and the Society.

== See also ==
- Calcutta School of Music
- Eastern Fare Music Foundation
