= Raees (2017 film) =

2017 Indian film by Rahul Dholakia

- Theatrical release poster
- Directed by: Rahul Dholakia
- Written by: Rahul Dholakia; Harit Mehta; Ashish Vashi; Niraj Shukla
- Produced by: Ritesh Sidhwani; Farhan Akhtar; Gauri Khan
- Starring: Shah Rukh Khan; Nawazuddin Siddiqui; Mahira Khan
- Cinematography: K. U. Mohanan
- Edited by: Deepa Bhatia
- Music by: Ram Sampath; JAM8
- Production companies: Red Chillies Entertainment; Excel Entertainment
- Distributed by: AA Films; Zee Studios International
- Release date: 25 January 2017
- Running time: 143 minutes
- Country: India
- Language: Hindi
- Budget: ₹87 crore
- Box office: est. ₹281 crore

Raees (transl. Rich) is a 2017 Indian Hindi-language gangster action film directed by Rahul Dholakia and produced by Ritesh Sidhwani, Farhan Akhtar, and Gauri Khan under Excel Entertainment and Red Chillies Entertainment. The film stars Shah Rukh Khan, Nawazuddin Siddiqui, and Mahira Khan in her only Hindi acting credit. The film was reported to be based on the life of criminal Abdul Latif, however the makers have denied this claim. The film's soundtrack was composed by Ram Sampath, which received over 1.6 billion streams on YouTube.

Raees was released on 25 January 2017, coinciding with the Indian Republic Day, and received positive reviews from critics who praised the performances of Khan and Siddiqui, production design, cinematography, and visual effects. The film emerged as a moderate success at the box-office, becoming the 6th highest-grossing Hindi film of 2017. It was also the most pirated Hindi film of 2017.

At the 63rd Filmfare Awards, the film received five nominations, including Best Actor (Khan).

== Plot ==
In the 1960s in Fatehpur, Gujarat, Raees, a resourceful young boy, becomes involved in the illegal liquor trade. Guided by his mother’s belief that no occupation is inherently low, he begins working with his friend Sadiq for local gangster Jairaj. Raees soon proves his intelligence in smuggling operations and rises within the network. Eventually, he breaks away from Jairaj with the support of crime boss Musabhai and establishes his own liquor business, gaining influence in the community and political backing from both the state’s Chief Minister and opposition leader Pashabhai.

An honest police officer, ACP Majmudar, is transferred to Fatehpur and begins a crackdown on the liquor trade, targeting Raees. Despite repeated attempts, Raees continues to evade arrest, intensifying their rivalry. After surviving an assassination attempt by Jairaj, Raees kills him in retaliation. During this time, he marries his neighbour Aasiya, and the couple have a son.

Using his political connections, Raees arranges for Majmudar’s transfer and expands into a real-estate project. However, Majmudar continues to secretly monitor his activities. After a dispute with Pashabhai, Raees is briefly imprisoned as part of a political maneuver. Feeling betrayed when the Chief Minister and Pashabhai form an alliance, Raees enters local politics and wins an election with strong community support.

Seeing him as a threat, the Chief Minister reinstates Majmudar in Fatehpur and declares Raees’s real-estate project illegal, leaving him heavily indebted to his supporters. Facing financial ruin and business losses during communal unrest and curfews, Raees turns to Musabhai for help and agrees to smuggle gold. He later discovers that the operation was used to smuggle explosives involved in a series of bombings across India.

Devastated after many of his associates are arrested or killed, Raees confronts and kills Musabhai for using him in the plot. He then surrenders to Majmudar, aware of his fate. After reflecting on their long rivalry, Majmudar shoots Raees. As he dies, Raees recalls moments from his life and his mother’s teachings.

== Cast ==
- Shah Rukh Khan as Raees Alam, a gangster-turned-MLA
  - Shubham Chintamani as young Raees
- Nawazuddin Siddiqui as ACP Jaideep Ambalal Majmudar, IPS
- Mahira Khan as Aasiya Qazi Alam, Raees's wife
- Mohammed Zeeshan Ayyub as Sadiq Khan, Raees's friend
  - Shubham Tukaram as young Sadiq
- Sheeba Chaddha as Amina Hussain Alam, Raees' mother
- Atul Kulkarni as Jairaj Seth
- Narendra Jha as Musa Bhai
- Jaideep Ahlawat as Nawab, Musabhai's assistant
- Uday Tikekar as Pasha Bhai, Opposition leader
- Nalneesh Neel as Lalji
- Pramod Pathak as Chief Minister of Gujarat
- Utkarsh Mazumdar as Dr. Sanjanwala, eye specialist
- Bimal Trivedi as Narol Chowkdi truck driver
- Sunil Upadhyay as Taufiq
- Fareed Arif as Eijaz
- Raj Arjun as Ilyas
- Anil Charanjeett as Qasim Mechanic
- Suparna Marwah as Aasiya's mother
- Shahnawaz Pradhan as Ujjwalbhai
- Sanjay Gurbaxani as Commissioner
- Pranay Narayan as Ramnikbhai, Jairaj's assistant
- Sunny Leone as an item girl in the song "Laila Main Laila"

== Production ==
Principal photography began in April 2015. The film was primarily shot in Mumbai, where sets were redesigned to recreate the slums of Ahmedabad. The final shooting schedule took place in Gujarat in January 2016. Despite protests, filming continued in Bhuj between January and February 2016 without major disruptions. The production also faced a clearance issue with the Archaeological Survey of India regarding permission to film at Sarkhej Roza.

== Music ==
Ram Sampath composed the film score and songs. The soundtrack of the film was released by Zee Music Company.

The song "Laila Main Laila" from the 1980 film Qurbani was written by Indeevar, and was originally composed by Kalyanji–Anandji, sung by Kanchan, Amit Kumar, Chorus, was recreated for the film by composer Ram Sampath. Additional lyrics were written by Javed Akhtar.

As of October 2018, the soundtrack has received over 800 million streams on YouTube.

== Marketing and release ==
Raees was promoted on several television shows, including The Kapil Sharma Show and Bigg Boss, and was also promoted in Dubai. Shah Rukh Khan and Sunny Leone also undertook a promotional train journey on the August Kranti Rajdhani Express from Mumbai to Delhi on 23–24 January 2017.

Raees was initially scheduled for release on 6 July 2016, coinciding with Eid. However, the release was postponed to avoid a box-office clash with Sultan, starring Salman Khan. The film was later rescheduled for 26 January 2017, coinciding with India’s Republic Day, which resulted in a clash with Kaabil, starring Hrithik Roshan. Both films were subsequently preponed by a day and released on 25 January 2017. Raees was released on approximately 3,500 screens worldwide.

== Controversies ==
In March 2016, a legal notice was reportedly sent by Mustak Ahmed, the son of alleged gangster Abdul Latif, questioning why a film was being made based on his father's life.

Ankita Shorey was reportedly considered for the female lead role in the film before the part was eventually given to Mahira Khan. Shorey later stated that the decision was not related to nationality. Some media reports claimed that Shorey had been “replaced” and described her as having been “part of the project.” However, Shorey clarified that she had never referred to being “replaced” and that the phrase used in her interview was that she had been “strongly considered for the project.” The journalist who conducted the interview later issued an apology for the misquotation.

Farhan Akhtar stated that if the film had been produced after the terror attack, the makers would not have cast Mahira Khan. He added that expressions of solidarity with the Indian Army were a personal matter and that only the Indian government had the authority to provide guidance on such issues, rather than external groups.

The trailer drew criticism from Shia muslims over a scene in which Shah Rukh Khan is shown crossing in front of an alam, a symbol regarded as sacred in Shia Islam. The trailer was later re-edited, and the scene was removed.

On 11 January 2017, it was reported that Shiv Sena again demanded a ban on the film. They had reportedly threatened cinema owners in Chhattisgarh not to screen the film.

Three days before the release of the film, Kailash Vijayvargiya, National General Secretary of BJP, termed Raees as a "dishonest" and "anti-national" film, while termed Kaabil as a "patriotic" film; he had stated in 2015 that Shah Rukh Khan was a defector and had not reacted to the 1993 Bombay bombings or 2008 Mumbai attacks.

The film is banned in Pakistan due to its "objectionable content" by Central Board of Film Censors, the regulatory body and censorship board of Pakistan.

=== MNS opposition and Pakistani actor controversy ===
Following the 2016 Uri attack, the Maharashtra Navnirman Sena (MNS) called for a ban on films featuring Pakistani actors, stating that such actors had not publicly condemned terrorism. Raees was included on the list because it featured Pakistani actress Mahira Khan. The MNS initially proposed that producers should refrain from casting Pakistani artists in future films and make a financial contribution to the Indian Army welfare fund as a condition for lifting the ban. However, the Indian Army reportedly declined the proposed contribution, stating that the sacrifices of soldiers should not be politicised. The ban on Raees was later lifted without these conditions.

Film producer Farhan Akhtar later stated that he had received threats from the MNS and clarified that he would not make a ₹5 crore contribution to the Indian Army welfare fund. Maharashtra Chief Minister Devendra Fadnavis later stated that such a contribution had never been a mandatory condition for lifting the ban on films featuring Pakistani actors. At a separate event, he referred to Shah Rukh Khan as an “icon” and described him as a “proud Mumbaikar”.

In December 2016, Shah Rukh Khan met MNS president Raj Thackeray and assured him that Mahira Khan would not travel to India to promote the film. He also stated that he would refrain from working with Pakistani actors in his future film projects.

=== Stampede incident ===
During a promotional event, a stampede occurred at the railway platform in Vadodara when the train carrying Shah Rukh Khan departed after a long halt amid a large crowd. A fan, Farid Khan Sherani, a member of the Samajwadi Party, died in hospital following the incident, and several others were injured. Shah Rukh Khan later expressed condolences over the fan’s death.

== Reception ==
=== Critical response ===
==== India ====
Taran Adarsh of Bollywood Hungama rated the film 4 out of 5 stars and said director Dholakia "depicts the power play and the cat and mouse chase between Raees and the honest cop Jaideep with flourish and that, in my opinion, is the mainstay of the enterprise." Nihit Bhave of The Times of India rated the film 3.5 out of 5 stars and wrote, "The movie can feel a bit long, but if you're going for a great SRK performance and some good ol' popcorn-entertainment, it might just 'raees' to the occasion." Devarshi Ghosh of India Today rated the film 3.5 out of 5 stars and wrote, "The filmmaking is pure masala and this is one well-cooked masala movie. The story is not surprising, but Rahul Dholakia's treatment seems fresh."

Rajeev Masand of News18 gave the film 3 out of 5 stars and said, "The film, expectedly, is powered by the star wattage of Shah Rukh Khan himself, as most of his films usually are. From his introduction scene, lacerating his back during a Moharram gathering, to a Scarface-like shootout, all guns blazing, to his many moments simmering with rage, Shah Rukh commands your attention. In more pensive moments and a quiet breakdown scene, he reveals the actor behind the star."

Writing for The Hindu, Namrata Joshi gave the film 3 out of 5 stars and wrote, "In Raees, he (SRK) and Dholakia would rather dare than play it safe. The character, a complicated portrayal, is in line with grounding SRK in his faith, and making him rise above it." Saibal Chatterjee of NDTV rated the film 3 out of 5 stars and commented, "Raees might be markedly unfamiliar territory, but [Dholakia] doesn't let that fact undermine the content and its context. The balance that he achieves lends the film sustained solidity." Shubhra Gupta of The Indian Express rated the film 2.5 out of 5 stars and wrote, "SRK breaks through in some moments but is stymied by florid, seen-too-many-times flourishes in Raees. It is Nawazuddin Siddiqui who really shines through." and Anupama Chopra gave the film 3 out of 5 stars, saying "The best way to enjoy Raees then is to manage expectations first. This is an uneven film. In places, you will applaud and whistle. But you might also find yourself utterly exhausted."

Rohit Bhatnagar of Deccan Chronicle rated the film 2 out of 5 stars and said, "The film could have been much more thrilling and gut-wrenching." Raghav Jaitly from Zee News rated the film 3 out of 5 stars and applauded its "powerhouse performances". He described the film, "From dialogue delivery to slow-motion sequences, the movie will give you goosebumps at times. If you want to witness high-octane actions, intense emotions and sincere filmmaking, then go for 'Raees'. It amalgamates Shah Rukh's charm and Rahul's intelligence." Writing for Hindustan Times, Sarit Ray gave the film 2 out of 5 stars, saying "Raees also deserves credit for going with a principal set of Muslim protagonists, a rarity for present-day Bollywood. Nawazuddin Siddiqui has the best lines. Raees perhaps works only as an SRK showcase."

==== Overseas ====
Sneha May Francis and Mahwash Ajaz of Dawn respectively commented, "This isn't a fine film. It's vintage Bollywood fluff, which SRK will manage to turn into box-office gold." and, "Raees is the story of neither a hero nor a villain – it is the story of a man who lived in a corrupted system with corrupted morals." Manjusha Radhakrishnan of Gulf News gave the film 3 out of 5 stars and wrote, "While the film is engaging, what lets it down are some of the contrived and ridiculous twists in the second half. But the climax packs a punch, and that misgiving – 'where is this film going?' – is erased." Rachel Saltz of The New York Times stated that "Avoiding flabby subplots, Mr. Dholakia keeps "Raees" taut and suspenseful, even at two and a half hours, though it probably has a song too many."

=== Box office ===
Worldwide, Raees grossed ₹272.54 crore (US$41.85 million), (Note: Raees worldwide gross: Domestic: ₹176.6 crore (US$27.12 million); Overseas: US$14.1 million (₹95.88 crore)) becoming the highest-grossing Hindi film of 2017 at the time of its release. It also became the highest-grossing January release for a Hindi film since 1994 and ranked among the highest-grossing Indian films of all time.

Raees grossed ₹128 crore worldwide during its opening weekend. In India, the film earned ₹177 crore (US$27.18 million) at the box office. Made on a budget of ₹91 crore, it recorded a domestic net collection of ₹139 crore (US$21.34 million) and a distributor share of ₹67.3 crore.

Raees was the most pirated Hindi film of 2017, with approximately 6.2 million online file sharers worldwide, primarily in India and Pakistan. The piracy was reported to have negatively affected the film’s domestic box office performance in India.

==== Domestic ====
In the domestic market, Raees grossed ₹20.4 crore (US$3.13 million) on its opening day, followed by ₹26.3 crore (US$4.04 million) on the second day and ₹13.1 crore (US$2.01 million) on the third day. The film collected ₹15.6 crore (US$2.4 million) on the fourth day and ₹17.8 crore (US$2.73 million) on the fifth day, bringing its extended opening weekend total to ₹93.2 crore (US$14.31 million).

On the sixth day, the film grossed ₹7.5 crore (US$1.15 million), and on the seventh day it earned ₹8.27 crore (US$1.27 million), taking its first-week total to ₹109 crore (US$16.74 million). The film went on to gross ₹166 crore (US$25.49 million) in three weeks and ₹191 crore (US$29.33 million) after four weeks of release.

==== Overseas ====
In overseas markets, Raees grossed US$6.7 million (₹45.63 crore) during its five-day extended opening weekend. Within four weeks, the film had earned ₹90.2 crore (US$13.85 million) internationally. Overall, the film grossed US$14.1 million (₹95.88 crore) overseas, becoming the highest-grossing Bollywood film in international markets in 2017. It also set a record for the highest weekend gross for a Bollywood film in Singapore.

== Accolades ==
Award	Category	Recipients and nominees	Results
10th Mirchi Music Awards	Upcoming Music Composer of The Year	JAM8 for "Zaalima"	Won
63rd Filmfare Awards	Best Actor	Shah Rukh Khan	Nominated
63rd Filmfare Awards	Best Male Playback Singer	Arijit Singh for "Zaalima"	Nominated
63rd Filmfare Awards	Best Production Design	Anita Rajgopalan Lata, Donald Reagen Gracy	Nominated
63rd Filmfare Awards	Best Sound Design	Baylon Fonseca, Dhiman Karmakar	Nominated
63rd Filmfare Awards	Best Action	Ravi Varma	Nominated
Indian Recording Arts Awards	Best Sound Mix	Baylon Fonseca	Won
Screen Awards	Best Male Playback Singer	Arijit Singh for "Zaalima" in Raees (also for "Galti Se Mistake" in Jagga Jasoos)	Won
Zee Cine Awards	Best Lyricist	Amitabh Bhattacharya for "Zaalima"	Won
Zee Cine Awards	Best Action	Ravi Varma	Nominated
Zee Cine Awards	Best Production Design	Donald Reagen Gracy, Anita Rajgopalan Lata	Nominated
Zee Cine Awards	Best Actor – Male	Shah Rukh Khan	Nominated
Zee Cine Awards	Best Track of the Year	"Zaalima" and "Laila Main Laila"	Nominated
