= Shankar–Ehsaan–Loy discography =

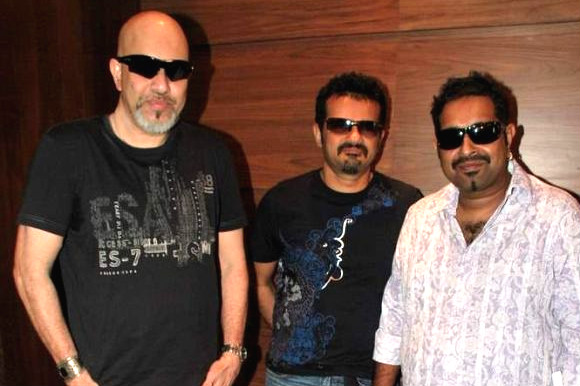
- Loy, Ehsaan and Shankar

This is a discography of composer trio, record producer and multi-instrumentalists Shankar–Ehsaan–Loy.

== Film discography ==
=== Original soundtracks ===
Year	Film	Lyricist	Film Director	Notes	Ref.
1997	Dus	Sameer	Mukul S. Anand	The film remained incomplete and unreleased due to Mukul Anand's death in 1997. The soundtrack album was however released as a tribute to Mukul.	
1999	Shool	Sameer	E.Nivas		
1999	Rockford	Gulzar	Nagesh Kukunoor	English film	
1999	Dillagi	Javed Akhtar	Sunny Deol	Composed with Jatin–Lalit, Anand–Milind and Sukhwinder Singh	
1999	Bhopal Express		Mahesh Mathai		
2000	Mission Kashmir	Rahat Indori; Sameer	Vidhu Vinod Chopra	Nominated – IIFA Best Music Director Award; Nominated – IIFA Best Background Score Award	
2001	Dil Chahta Hai	Javed Akhtar	Farhan Akhtar	Won – Filmfare RD Burman Award for New Music Talent; Won – Star Screen Award for Best Music Director; Nominated – Filmfare Best Music Director Award; Nominated – IIFA Best Music Director Award	
2001	Aalavandhan	Vairamuthu	Suresh Krissna	Tamil film	
2001	Abhay	Javed Akhtar	Suresh Krissna		
2002	Yeh Kya Ho Raha Hai?	Javed Akhtar	Hansal Mehta		
2003	Ek Aur Ek Gyarah	Sameer	David Dhawan		
2003	Armaan	Javed Akhtar	Honey Irani		
2003	Nayee Padosan	Sameer	B.H. Tharun Kumar		
2003	Kuch Naa Kaho	Javed Akhtar	Rohan Sippy		
2003	Kal Ho Naa Ho	Javed Akhtar	Nikhil Advani	Won – National Film Award for Best Music Direction; Won – Filmfare Best Music Director Award; Won – IIFA Best Music Director Award	
2004	Kyun! Ho Gaya Na...	Javed Akhtar	Samir Karnik		
2004	Lakshya	Javed Akhtar	Farhan Akhtar		
2004	Phir Milenge	Prasoon Joshi	Revathi		
2005	Bunty Aur Babli	Gulzar	Shaad Ali	Won – Filmfare Best Music Director Award; Won – IIFA Best Music Director Award	
2005	Dil Jo Bhi Kahey...	Javed Akhtar	Romesh Sharma		
2005	Rudraksh	Sameer; Arun Bhairav	Mani Shankar		
2006	Kabhi Alvida Naa Kehna	Javed Akhtar	Karan Johar	Nominated – Filmfare Best Music Director Award Nominated – IIFA Best Music Director Award	
2006	Don	Javed Akhtar	Farhan Akhtar	Nominated – IIFA Best Music Director Award; Nominated – Filmfare Best Music Director Award	
2007	Salaam-e-Ishq	Sameer	Nikhil Advani		
2007	Marigold	Javed Akhtar	Willard Carroll	Bilingual film	
2007	Jhoom Barabar Jhoom	Gulzar	Shaad Ali		
2007	Heyy Babyy	Sameer	Sajid Khan		
2007	Dum Kata	Gulzar	Amol Palekar		
2007	Johnny Gaddaar	Jaideep Sahni	Sriram Raghavan		
2007	Taare Zameen Par	Prasoon Joshi	Aamir Khan	Nominated – Star Screen Award for Best Music Director	
2008	Thoda Pyaar Thoda Magic	Prasoon Joshi	Kunal Kohli		
2008	Rock On!!	Javed Akhtar	Abhishek Kapoor	Nominated – Filmfare Best Music Director Award; Nominated – IIFA Best Music Director Award; Nominated – Star Screen Award for Best Music Director	
2009	Luck By Chance	Javed Akhtar	Zoya Akhtar		
2009	Chandni Chowk to China	Rajat Arora	Nikhil Advani		
2009	Konchem Ishtam Konchem Kashtam	Sirivennela Seetharama Sastry; Chandrabose; Ramajogayya Sastry	Kishore Kumar Pardasani	Telugu film	
2009	Yavarum Nalam	Thamarai	Vikram Kumar	Tamil film	
2009	13B	Neelesh Misra	Vikram Kumar		
2009	Shortkut	Javed Akhtar	Neeraj Vora		
2009	Wake Up Sid	Javed Akhtar	Ayan Mukerji	Nominated – Filmfare Best Music Director Award	
2009	London Dreams	Prasoon Joshi	Vipul Amrutlal Shah		
2010	My Name is Khan	Niranjan Iyengar	Karan Johar	Won – Star Screen Award for Best Music Director; Nominated – Filmfare Best Music Director Award	
2010	Karthik Calling Karthik	Javed Akhtar	Vijay Lalwani		
2010	Hum Tum Aur Ghost	Javed Akhtar	Kabeer Kaushik		
2010	Housefull	Sameer; Amitabh Bhattacharya	Sajid Khan		
2010	Tere Bin Laden	Jaideep Sahni	Abhishek Sharma		
2010	We Are Family	Irshad Kamil; Anvita Dutt Guptan	Siddharth Malhotra		
2011	Patiala House	Anvita Dutt Guptan	Nikhil Advani		
2011	Game	Javed Akhtar	Abhinay Deo		
2011	Zokkomon	Javed Akhtar	Satyajit Bhatkal		
2011	Zindagi Na Milegi Dobara	Javed Akhtar	Zoya Akhtar		
2011	Aarakshan	Prasoon Joshi	Prakash Jha		
2011	Don 2	Javed Akhtar	Farhan Akhtar		
2011	West is West		Andy De Emmony		
2012	Chittagong	Prasoon Joshi	Bedabrata Pain		
2012	Dekh Indian Circus	Prasoon Joshi	Mangesh Hadawale		
2012	Delhi Safari	Sameer	Nikhil Advani		
2013	Vishwaroopam	Vairamuthu; Javed Akhtar	Kamal Haasan	Simultaneously shot in Tamil	
2013	Bhaag Milkha Bhaag	Prasoon Joshi	Rakeysh Omprakash Mehra		
2013	D-Day	Niranjan Iyengar	Nikhil Advani		
2014	One By Two	Amitabh Bhattacharya	Devika Bhagat		
2014	Darr @ The Mall	Amitabh Bhattacharya	Pavan Kirpalani		
2014	2 States	Amitabh Bhattacharya	Abhishek Varman	Won – Filmfare Best Music Director Award	
2014	Kill Dil	Gulzar	Shaad Ali		
2015	Dil Dhadakne Do	Javed Akhtar	Zoya Akhtar		
2015	Katti Batti	Kumaar	Nikhil Advani		
2016	Ghayal: Once Again	Amitabh Bhattacharya	Sunny Deol		
2016	Mirzya	Gulzar	Rakesh Omprakash Mehra		
2016	Rock On 2	Javed Akhtar	Shujaat Saudagar		
2018	Raazi	Gulzar	Meghna Gulzar		
2018	Soorma	Gulzar	Shaad Ali		
2019	Manikarnika: The Queen of Jhansi	Prasoon Joshi	Krish		
2019	Saaho	Manoj Yadav; Krishna Kanth; Madhan Karky	Sujeeth	Simultaneously shot in Telugu	
2019	The Zoya Factor	Amitabh Bhattacharya	Abhishek Sharma		
2020	Panga	Javed Akhtar	Ashwiny Iyer Tiwari		
2020	Chhapaak	Gulzar	Meghna Gulzar		
2020	Bandish Bandits	Tanishk Nabar, Sameer Samant, Divyanshu Malhotra	Anand Tiwari	Amazon Prime Video web series	
2020	It's My Life	Nilesh Mishra, Shabbir Ahmed Anees Bazmee	Zee Cinema film		
2021	Toofaan	Javed Akhtar	Rakeysh Omprakash Mehra	Amazon Prime Video film	
2021	Bunty Aur Babli 2	Amitabh Bhattacharya	Varun V. Sharma		
2022	Dhaakad	Amitabh Bhattacharya	Razneesh Ghai		
2022	Samrat Prithviraj	Varun Grover	Chandraprakash Dwivedi		
2023	Dono	Irshad Kamil	Avinash Barjatya		
2023	Sam Bahadur	Gulzar	Meghna Gulzar		
2023	The Archies	Javed Akhtar	Zoya Akhtar	Netflix film	
2024	Yudhra	Javed Akhtar	Ravi Udaywar		
2025	Sitaare Zameen Par	Amitabh Bhattacharya	R. S. Prasanna		
2025	Housefull 5	Amitabh Bhattacharya	Tarun Mansukhani	One song contribution - "Housefull 5 Mixtape" along with Sajid–Wajid, Julius Packiam	
2026	Chatha Pacha	Vinayak Sasikumar	Advaith Nayar	Malayalam film	
TBA	Kaaliyan †	Rajeev Nair	S. Mahesh	Malayalam film	

=== Adapted soundtracks ===
Year	Film	Lyricist	Film director	Language	Notes	References
2015	Katyar Kaljat Ghusali	Sameer Samant; Purushottam Darvhekar; Mandar Cholkar; Mangesh Kangane	Subodh Bhave	Marathi	Adapted original music by Pandit Jeetendra Abhisheki.	

=== As guest composers ===
Year	Film	Lyricist	Film director	Language	Notes	References
2015	Mitwaa	Ashwini Shende	Swapna Waghmare Joshi	Marathi	As Guest composers. Accepted no remuneration.	

=== Shelved projects ===
This section contains soundtracks for films that have been shelved or whose release dates are unknown.

Year	Film	Language	Notes
2013	The Desire	English; Chinese; Hindi	Delayed; Indo-Chinese venture directed by R. Sarath
2013	Banda Yeh Bindaas Hai	Hindi	Shelved
2013	Koochie Koochie Hota Hai	Hindi	Animation film, remake of Kuch Kuch Hota Hai

== Albums ==
Year	Album details	Tracklist
2007	High School Musical 2: Hindi Version (CD 1 of 2-disc Special Edition Soundtrack): Released: 21 June 2011; Label: Times Music; Format: CD	Tracklist: 1. All For One (Aaja Nachle) - Arijit Singh, Tarannum Malik, Earl Edgar D, Raja Hasan, Shilpa Rao; 2. Ud Chale - Shankar Mahadevan, Vishal Dadlani, June Banerjee; 3. Chhoti Si - Raman Mahadevan, Aditi Singh Sharma, Neurman Pinto, Akriti Kakkar
2012	Coke Studio; As Ehsaan & Loy	Tracklist: 1. "Subhan Allah" - Jasbir Jassi; 2. "Man Patang" - Mahalakshmi Iyer, Dominique Cerejo, Banjyotsna Borgohain, Sharodee Borah; 3. "Zamana Kharab Hai" - Dominique Cerejo, Bhanu Pratap Singh; 4. "Dil Loche" - Divya Kumar & Mahalakshmi Iyer; 5. "Joh Chahenge Voh Karenge" - Benny Dayal

- As Instant Karma:
  - Dance Masti (1997) (Remix album)
  - The Return of Dance Masti (1999) (Remix album)
  - Dance Masti... Again (2006) (Remix album)
  - Dance Masti Forever (2009) (Remix album)
  - The Best of Dance Masti 3-CD Set
  - The Dance Masti Collection 4-CD Set

== TV series ==
Year	Series	Notes	Ref.
1989	Fauji	as Ehsaan and Loy	
1990	The World This Week	Opening theme for Prannoy Roy's version, as Ehsaan and Loy	
2004	Saathiya – Pyar Ka Naya Ehsaas	Title track	
2008	Kya Aap Paanchvi Pass Se Tez Hain?	Title track	
2010	Rang Badalti Odhani	Title track	

== Singles ==
=== Soundtrack singles ===
Year	Film	Language	Single	Notes
2004	Vanity Fair	Rajasthani	"Gori Re"	First international project, directed by Mira Nair.
2009	Sikander	Hindi	"Dhoop Ke Sikke"	Also starred in the promotional video of the single.

== Compilations ==
- The Best of Shankar Ehsaan Loy (2-CD Set) ( (India) 2010) – Sony Music Entertainment

== Music videos ==
Year	Title	Director
1999	"Suno Gaur Se"	Anil Naidu
2000	"Rind Posh Maal"	Vidhu Vinod Chopra
2007	"Move your Body"	Sriram Raghavan
2008	"Egire Egire"	Kishore Kumar Pardasani
2009	"Dhoop Ke Sikke"	Piyush Jha
2011	"De Ghuma Ke"	Piyush Raghani
2013	"Betiyaan" (Save the Girl Child)	Raajeev Walia

=== Featured singles ===
Year	Details	Notes
2010	"Phir Mile Sur Mera Tumhara": Released: 26 January 2010; Format: music download	More Shankar–Ehsaan–Loy were among the featured artists in Phir Mile Sur Mera Tumhara.
2010	"Sajana" (Show It Off) (with Amar): Released: 16 February 2010; Label: Sunset Entertainment, Universal Music Group (India); Format: CD single, digital download	More Shankar–Ehsaan–Loy were featured in the music video of the song Sajana from the album Show It Off by British Indian singer Amar

== Theatre ==
- Zangoora (2010)

== Concerts ==
- Shankar-Ehsaan-Loy Inspiration: Aman Ki Aasha tour

== Ad jingles ==
=== As Ehsaan and Loy ===
- Pepsi
- Coca-Cola
- Kingfisher
- Slice
- Eveready Red
- Vaseline
- Future Group
- Cadbury's Perk
- Fevicol
- Close Up
- Fair & Lovely

=== As Shankar, Ehsaan and Loy ===
- Pepsi – Oye Bubbly
- Coca-Cola – Sab Ka Thanda Ek
- Brooke Bond
- Digjam
- ICICI
- Visa – Inspire India
- IRB
- Lux – Sone Se Bhi Sona Lage
- Snap Deal – Unbox Zindagi

== Signature tunes ==
Corporate

  - Reliance (Anil Dhirubhai Ambani Group): Composed the Corporate Identity for Reliance.
  - Aircel: Signature Tune
  - Tata Steel: Official Corporate Anthem
  - Apollo Hospitals: Official anthem
- Sports Anthems
  - De Ghuma Ke: 2011 Cricket World Cup official anthem
  - Rockvi Jayagamu (Yamu Yamu): Carlton Super Sevens Rugby League Theme Song
  - 2010 Commonwealth Games: Scored the commonwealth song "Dilli Chalo!". (Not to be confused with the official anthem "Jiyo Utho Bado Jeeto" composed by A. R. Rahman)
  - Ek Desh Ek Junoon: SET Max's campaign for the 2009 Indian Premier League
  - Sahara Pune Warriors: Official Anthem
- Public Awareness Campaigns
  - Sarva Shiksha Abhiyan: The song for the ad campaign "School Chalein Hum".
  - The Greenathon Anthem: The song Hawaein feat. Preeti Zinta.
  - India Poised: The signature tune for Times of India campaign. Lyrics penned by Gulzar.
  - India Rising anthem for CNN-IBN The India Rising campaign. Sung by Asha Bhosle

== Singers debuted with Shankar–Ehsaan–Loy ==
Below are the list of singers who made their singing debuts for Shankar-Ehsaan-Loy.*

Year	Name	Movie	Notes
1997	Mahalakshmi Iyer	Dus	First title song for Ek Se Badh Kar Ek, also composed by Shankar-Ehsaan-Loy; Favorite singer of Ehsaan Noorani
1997	Dominique Cerejo	Dus	Wife of Clinton Cerejo
1997	Madhushree	Dus	Bengali singer, sang several songs for A. R. Rahman
1999	Chetan Shashital	Shool	
2001	Caralisa Monteiro	Dil Chahta Hai	Chorus for the songs "Jaane Kyon" and "Rockin' Goa"
2002	Arnab Chakrabarty	Yeh Kya Ho Raha Hai?	
2005	Nihira Joshi	Bunty Aur Babli	SA RE GA MA PA CHALLENGE 2005 Finalist
2006	Shafqat Amanat Ali	Kabhi Alvida Naa Kehna	Pakistani singer, son of Ustad Amanat Ali Khan.
2007	Anusha Mani	Johnny Gaddaar	
2007	Arijit Singh	High School Musical 2: Hindi Version	
2007	Hard Kaur	Johnny Gaddaar	Indian rapper, also an actor.
2007	Gulraj Singh	Johnny Gaddaar	
2007	Rehan Khan	Heyy Babyy	
2008	Amit Paul	Luck By Chance	Runner up, Indian Idol 3
2009	Abhijit Ghoshal	London Dreams	Only singer in the history of Saregamapa to win the title it 11 consecutive times
2010	Alyssa Mendonsa	Karthik Calling Karthik	Daughter of Loy Mendonsa
2010	Tarun Sagar	Housefull	Saregamapa Challenge 2005 contestant
2011	Maria del Mar Fernández	Zindagi Na Milegi Dobara	Flamenco artist, made film debut with the song "Señorita"

*List includes professional singers only. Actors like Farhan Akhtar, Abhay deol not included.
