= Don 2 (soundtrack) =

- Original soundtrack album cover

Soundtrack album by Shankar–Ehsaan–Loy
- Released: 16 November 2011
- Recorded: 2011
- Studios: SEL Studio, Mumbai
- Genre: Feature film soundtrack
- Length: 34:31
- Language: Hindi
- Label: T-Series
- Producer: Shankar–Ehsaan–Loy

Shankar–Ehsaan–Loy chronology
Aarakshan (2011)	Don 2 (2011)	Chittagong (2012)

Don 2 is the soundtrack to the 2011 film of the same name directed by Farhan Akhtar and produced by Red Chillies Entertainment and Excel Entertainment starring Shah Rukh Khan and Priyanka Chopra. A sequel to Don (2006), the film's soundtrack features nine songs, composed by Shankar–Ehsaan–Loy and lyrics written by Javed Akhtar. The album was released through T-Series label on 16 November 2011.

The album consisted of numerous genres ranging from retro to funk and incorporates the titular theme from the first film throughout the songs and score. Most of the numbers were situational in order to adapt with the screenplay. It received generally mixed response from music critics, who noted the repetitive nature of the main theme in all of the songs.

== Production ==
Don 2's soundtrack and original score were composed by Shankar–Ehsaan–Loy who worked with Farhan in all of his directorials, including the predecessor. Due to the fast-paced screenplay, the songs are constructed in a way that should be situational and not disrupt the flow of the narrative. Hence the trio composed four original songs for the film, much lesser than the predecessor's album. As per Farhan's suggestions, the trio went for a retro, funk-style music and referenced Shaft and Dirty Harry (both 1971) as examples for the film, but also wanted to compose the songs keeping in mind with the timeline.

== Composition ==
For the song "Zara Dil Ko Thaam Lo" sung by Vishal Dadlani and Anusha Mani, the trio produced a "very cheesy beat" resembling the early 1980s music from the band Ultravox. Mani was chosen to sing the song due to her husky texture in her voice. The song "Hai Ye Maya" was sung by Usha Uthup, and chosen as the first choice for the song as they felt that nobody can sing with the vibrato and tenor in her voice. "Dushman Mera" is performed by Shankar Mahadevan and Sunitha Sarathy. Mahadevan performed the song in a retro-styled manner replicating the voice of Kishore Kumar. The song was also processed in such a way to replicate the old studio recordings from the 1970s.

The theme song which was used in the opening credits, "The King Is Back" performed by Sarathy, incorporated the signature theme from the film and made it sound like a police siren. The song also reused the electronic line that the trio composed for the predecessor. "Mujhko Pehchaanlo" is the revised version of the title track "Main Hoon Don" from the first film. The trio took the same tune, modified with the addition of funk and change in lyrics, and brought KK to sing in place of Shaan, as the song is "[musically] pretty close to the original" and wanted to mix up with the original version.

The Don theme was incorporated throughout the film with numerous variations. He cited the Mission: Impossible and James Bond film series where the main theme appears through multiple instalments. "The 'Don' Waltz" is a waltz-type theme which was composed in order to produce a European spy film-kind of music. The background score was programmed and orchestrated by Tubby who worked with the trio on numerous films and provided inputs for the score. Ehsaan Noorani referenced Red (2010) citing the difficulties to score action thrillers, as "things are constantly in motion and the music has to keep up with everything". With Don 2 being an action thriller and the first in that genre they had worked on, it found difficult for them but considered it to be fun and worked very well in the final edit.

In early November, a song titled "Rehmat (Bhool Na Jaana)" was reported to be composed for the film. However, sources from the film's official spokesperson claimed the song to be fake and actually not in the film, adding that it was composed in order to capitalize on the film and the character's popularity and fans are downloading the song assuming that it is from the film.

== Release ==
Don 2's music rights were purchased by T-Series for ₹100 million (equivalent to ₹210 million or US$2.1 million in 2023). The soundtrack was released through the digital platform Hungama on 16 November 2011 sans a physical launch event. A physical launch event was held for releasing the music from the Tamil and Telugu-dubbed versions on 15 December 2011, with Khan and producer Ritesh Sidhwani.

== Reception ==
The soundtrack received mixed reviews from critics. Jaspreet Pandohar of BBC reviewed that the soundtrack "falls between pastiche and progress". Joginder Tuteja of Bollywood Hungama gave a rating of 3 out of 5, terming it a mixed bag and wrote "There isn't anything which comes across as memorable enough to be played a few months down the line, leave aside a few years. Eventually what you get is a soundtrack that would go along with the narrative and acts as a good situational ingredient but that's about it."

Sukanya Verma of Rediff.com gave the album a rating of 2 out of 5 calling it "safe and self-conscious" and wrote "Don 2's music could fare much better if the composers Shankar-Ehsaan-Loy had tried to step out of the prequel's shadow." Vipin Nair of Music Aloud rated 5.5 out of 10 and wrote "the Don template does have an allure about it, but SEL stretch that allure a bit too thin by using it in every song of the soundtrack. Bad move." Karthik Srinivasan of Milliblog wrote "The entire soundtrack seems to be milking the earlier Don title song and falls completely flat."

Gaurav Malani of The Times of India wrote "Shankar-Ehsaan-Loy's musical score doesn't leave a mark this time and the background score has to repeatedly resort to the theme-piece from the original for some impact." Lisa Tsering of The Hollywood Reporter, however was appreciative of the soundtrack and musical score. Sanjukta Sharma of Mint said that the background score "sounds strikingly similar to that of Ocean's Eleven".

== Track listing ==
All lyrics are written by Javed Akhtar; all music is composed by Shankar–Ehsaan–Loy.

No.	Title	Singer(s)	Length
1.	"Aa Raha Hoon Palat Ke"	Shah Rukh Khan	00:35
2.	"Zara Dil Ko Thaam Lo"	Vishal Dadlani, Anusha Mani	05:08
3.	"Hai Ye Maya"	Usha Uthup	04:42
4.	"Dushman Mera"	Shankar Mahadevan, Sunitha Sarathy	03:44
5.	"The King Is Back" (Theme)	Sunitha Sarathy	03:57
6.	"Mujhko Pehchaanlo"	KK	03:24
7.	"Hai Yeh Maya" (Remix by DJ Shane Mendonsa)	Usha Uthup	04:42
8.	"Mujhko Pehchaanlo" (Remix)	KK	04:51
9.	"The 'Don' Waltz"	Caralisa Monteiro	03:29
Total length:			34:31

== See also ==
- Don (soundtrack)
