= Kal Ho Naa Ho (soundtrack) =

Kal Ho Naa Ho (Original Motion Picture Soundtrack)

Soundtrack album by Shankar–Ehsaan–Loy
- Released: 27 September 2003
- Genre: Feature film soundtrack
- Length: 38:10
- Language: Hindi
- Label: Sony Music India
- Producer: Shankar–Ehsaan–Loy

Shankar–Ehsaan–Loy chronology
Kuch Naa Kaho (2003)	Kal Ho Naa Ho (Original Motion Picture Soundtrack) (2003)	Rudraksh (2004)

Kal Ho Naa Ho (Original Motion Picture Soundtrack) is the soundtrack album to the 2003 film of the same name directed by Nikkhil Advani and produced by Karan Johar under his Dharma Productions banner. The album featured seven tracks—five original songs, with an alternate version and an instrumental theme—all of them were composed by Shankar–Ehsaan–Loy with lyrics written by Javed Akhtar.

Kal Ho Naa Ho is the first collaboration between Johar and the trio. The music sessions were held in Pune where the trio had composed all the tunes located in a private hotel, with Akhtar and Advani's presence. Since the film is set in New York City, all the songs were composed with an international touch but used indigenous soundscape. This resulted in a soundtrack that combines and fuses various genres and cultures. The trio worked on curating a sound that resonates with the viewers after watching the film.

The soundtrack was released by Sony Music India on 27 September 2003 directly into the market, while an official launch event held two days later. The album received positive reviews with the songs—the title track, "It's the Time to Disco", "Kuch To Hua Hai" and "Pretty Woman"—becoming popular.

The album fetched the trio, their maiden National Film Award for Best Music Direction, while Sonu Nigam won the National Film Award for Best Male Playback Singer for the title track. It also won three awards each at Filmfare, International Indian Film Academy and Producers Guild Film Awards, one at the Zee Cine Awards, while also securing three nominations at the Screen Awards, albeit not winning any. Since its release, it has been considered as one of the iconic and successful soundtracks in Indian cinema, due to its distinctive cultural appeal.

== Production ==
=== Background and development ===
Johar ended his association with the composing duo Jatin–Lalit after they expressed their dissatisfaction on his decision to use other music directors for Kabhi Khushi Kabhie Gham (2001). He then approached the musical trio Shankar–Ehsaan–Loy (Note: Shankar–Ehsaan–Loy is a trio consisting of Shankar Mahadevan, Ehsaan Noorani and Loy Mendonsa.) to compose the soundtrack and musical score, in their maiden collaboration. Javed Akhtar associated with the trio to write the lyrics. According to Ehsaan Noorani, "If you see the film as a whole, you’ll realize how balanced it is; we had to crack that balance with the music". Loy Mendonsa further added that while the texture of the music had a global feel, the trio used Indian sounds to appeal with the audiences.

=== Composition ===
The title song "Kal Ho Naa Ho" was the first to be composed. Mendonsa met Advani at a German bakery in Pune, where the latter wanted a song thematically similar to Celine Dion's "My Heart Will Go On" (1997) which he was humming at the time. When he heard it, Mendonsa came up with the tune that he recorded it on his phone, and after Shankar Mahadevan and Noorani listened to it, the trio composed the song. Mahadevan also arranged and programmed the tune, besides composing, with one segment being based on R. D. Burman's works. The tune was composed within nine minutes.

When Akhtar had listened to the tune of "Kal Ho Naa Ho", he was concerned on writing the lyrics to the tune as it had a simplistic nature, and the lyrics should feel the same, adding that "it had to be a perfect amalgamation of words and music". Since the song had different stanzas for different situations, the song was nearly written within few weeks. (Note: While Akhtar added that it took him few days to write the song, Noorani stated that Akhtar took three weeks to write it.) Akhtar added that the song served as the backbone of the script threading through numerous situations and moments. Sonu Nigam was busy during the time when the song was about to be recorded. Instead of opting other singers, Johar decided to wait for Nigam's arrival, before he came back and recorded the song. After recording, Noorani stated that the song had to be redone, as "[Nigam] wanted to simplify the singing to do more justice to the song. When we re-recorded it, it made so much more sense."

"Maahi Ve" was described as a quintessential Dharma song, where all cast members dance together, including Kajol and Rani Mukerji making an appearance. The song was choreographed by Farah Khan and sung by Sujata Bhattacharya, Sadhana Sargam, Udit Narayan, Nigam and Mahadevan. Sargam sang the verse "chanda meri chanda, tujhe kaise main ye samjhau, mujhe lagti hai tu kitni pyaari re" (transl. My dearest, how do I explain how much I love you) sung by Jennifer "Jenny" Kapur (Jaya Bachchan). Noorani added that the verse was "a beautiful drop in the song" and Sargam's vocals being "naturally full of emotion. The way she sings it is bittersweet, capturing a love that persists despite the family’s dysfunction — coming together for the child." The song blends in emotional arcs in a full circle but does not dwell on them and focuses more on upbeat tunes. The party number "It's the Time to Disco" combines strings, brass and rhythm, except for the opening part which uses tabla over drums. It was primarily due to the diaspora setting as the film is centered around Indian immigrants in New York that lends to this fusion.

Akhtar refused Johar's request to write the lyrics for Kuch Kuch Hota Hai (1998) due to its double entendre title but later regretted the decision. Mendonsa recalled that "I owe Karan a couple of ‘kuch’s, [...] that’s why he wrote kuch toh hua hai (something is happening) / kuch ho gaya hai (something has happened) to return the two Kuchs he didn’t write for Kuch Kuch Hota Hai." Mahadevan described it as a conversational number that would emotionally affect the viewers while watching the film. Unlike in many previous Bollywood films, Johar complied with international copyright laws and obtained permission to rework Roy Orbison's 1964 song "Oh, Pretty Woman" for the film; the revised song was entitled "Pretty Woman", which blends bhangra with the American hook lines. Noorani recalled that Roy Orbison's wife Barbara had insisted on meeting them, and said this version of "Oh, Pretty Woman" was the first version she truly loved, of the millions she had heard. Akhtar initially had reservations about the song, but said he later loved it. Mahadevan added that he kept only the hook line "Pretty Woman" from the original song, and completely made it as their own which led to the song appealing to everyone.

The album featured a piano version of the song "Kal Ho Naa Ho" and a theme centered around the character Kantaben which was "hilarious" was sung by Mahadevan in "an over-the-top Gujarati style".

== Release ==
The soundtrack was released on 27 September 2003 directly into the stores. The album was distributed by Sony Music India which secured a licensing deal with Dharma Productions for a price of ₹3.5–40 million (US$420,000–480,000) plus royalty charges.

An audio launch ceremony was held on 29 September at the Taj Lands End hotel in Mumbai. The cast and crew attended the event, with all of them wearing costume and attire based on black color, with red chairs, red roses and a white backdrop to match the film's promotional theme. Besides the cast and crew interactions, a live musical performance has been organised by Shankar–Ehsaan–Loy and his musical team, performing all the songs from the album.

== Reception ==
The album met with positive reviews and the title song, "It's the Time to Disco", "Kuch To Hua Hai" and "Pretty Woman" became popular. It was one of the highest-selling albums of the year in India, with sales of over 2.3 million copies.

=== Critical reception ===
A Bollywood Hungama critic called it "a fabulous amalgamation of Indian melodies and contemporary sound." Critic Taran Adarsh wrote "Shankar-Ehsaan-Loy's music is melodious and sounds fresh to the ears. Of the songs, 'Pretty Woman', 'Mahi Ve' and the title track sound pleasant." Critic based at Sify felt that, apart from "Kal Ho Naa Ho" and "Kuch To Hua Hai", the rest of the songs were in the "'average' to 'very average' category".

Vipin Nair of Film Companion ranked the soundtrack 66th on his list of "100 Bollywood Albums". Nair noted that although the album "had a fairly diverse set of songs", he chose the title song as his favourite and called it "among the most moving songs produced since the start of the century". Aja Romano of Vox attributed on the fusion of genres, locations and cultural significance, resulting in the album being "one of the most successful soundtracks in Indian cinema".

=== Awards and nominations ===
Awards and nominations for Kal Ho Naa Ho (Original Motion Picture Soundtrack)
Award	Date of ceremony (Note: Date is linked to the article about the awards held that year, wherever possible.)	Category	Recipient(s) and nominee(s)	Result	Ref.
National Film Awards	3 February 2005	Best Music Direction	Shankar–Ehsaan–Loy	Won	
National Film Awards	3 February 2005	Best Male Playback Singer	Sonu Nigam for "Kal Ho Naa Ho"	Won	
Filmfare Awards	20 February 2004	Best Music Director	Shankar–Ehsaan–Loy	Won	
Filmfare Awards	20 February 2004	Best Lyricist	Javed Akhtar	Won	
Filmfare Awards	20 February 2004	Best Male Playback Singer	Sonu Nigam for "Kal Ho Naa Ho"	Won	
Filmfare Awards	20 February 2004	Best Female Playback Singer	Alka Yagnik for "Kal Ho Naa Ho" (sad version)	Nominated	
International Indian Film Academy Awards	20–22 May 2004	Best Music Director	Shankar–Ehsaan–Loy	Won	
International Indian Film Academy Awards	20–22 May 2004	Best Lyricist	Javed Akhtar	Won	
International Indian Film Academy Awards	20–22 May 2004	Best Male Playback Singer	Sonu Nigam for "Kal Ho Naa Ho"	Won	
International Indian Film Academy Awards	20–22 May 2004	Best Female Playback Singer	Alka Yagnik for "Kal Ho Naa Ho" (sad version)	Nominated	
International Indian Film Academy Awards	20–22 May 2004	Best Background Score	Shankar–Ehsaan–Loy	Won	
Producers Guild Film Awards	29 May 2004	Best Music Director	Shankar–Ehsaan–Loy	Won	
Producers Guild Film Awards	29 May 2004	Best Lyricist	Javed Akhtar	Won	
Producers Guild Film Awards	29 May 2004	Best Male Playback Singer	Sonu Nigam for "Kal Ho Naa Ho"	Won	
Producers Guild Film Awards	29 May 2004	Best Female Playback Singer	Vasundhara Das for "It's The Time to Disco"	Nominated	
Screen Awards	17 January 2004	Best Music Director	Shankar–Ehsaan–Loy	Nominated	
Screen Awards	17 January 2004	Best Lyricist	Javed Akhtar	Nominated	
Screen Awards	17 January 2004	Best Male Playback Singer	Sonu Nigam for "Kal Ho Naa Ho"	Nominated	
Zee Cine Awards	26 February 2004	Best Music Director	Shankar–Ehsaan–Loy	Nominated	
Zee Cine Awards	26 February 2004	Best Track of the Year	"Kal Ho Naa Ho"	Won	
Zee Cine Awards	26 February 2004	Best Track of the Year	"Maahi Ve"	Nominated	

== Impact ==
The title track was referenced in 2015 by the German Embassy in India, which produced an eight-minute video entitled Lebe Jetzt ("Live now" in German). The video features German Ambassador to India Michael Steiner, his wife Elisse and former Indian Minister of External Affairs Salman Khurshid in the roles played by Shah Rukh Khan, Zinta and Saif Ali Khan respectively. In 2020, during the COVID-19 pandemic lockdown in India, composer Anirudh Ravichander performed the instrumental version of the song "Kal Ho Naa Ho" on piano, describing the title song as one of his all-time favorite musical pieces.

== Track listing ==
Kal Ho Naa Ho (Original Motion Picture Soundtrack) track listing
No.	Title	Artist(s)	Length
1.	"Kal Ho Naa Ho"	Sonu Nigam	5:21
2.	"Maahi Ve"	Sujata Bhattacharya, Sadhana Sargam, Shankar Mahadevan, Sonu Nigam, Udit Narayan	6:06
3.	"It's the Time to Disco"	KK, Loy Mendonsa, Shaan, Vasundhara Das	5:33
4.	"Kuch To Hua Hai"	Alka Yagnik, Shaan	5:19
5.	"Kal Ho Naa Ho" (Sad)	Alka Yagnik, Richa Sharma, Sonu Nigam	5:35
6.	"Pretty Woman"	Ravi Khote, Shankar Mahadevan	5:53
7.	"Heartbeat (Note: The track "Heartbeat" was not included on Cassette format.)" (Instrumental)	—	4:23

== Bibliography ==
- Ausaja, S. M. M. (2009). Bollywood in Posters. Noida: Om Books International. ISBN 978-81-87108-55-9. Archived from the original on 7 April 2023.
