= Hai Junoon! (soundtrack) =

Soundtrack album by Shankar Mahadevan
- Released: 30 April 2025
- Genre: Soundtrack
- Length: 1:49:58
- Language: Hindi
- Label: Saregama
External audio
- Hai Junoon! Full Album on YouTube

Hai Junoon! is the soundtrack album to the musical drama television series of the same name created by Abhishek Sharma for JioHotstar and directed by Sharma and Aditya Bhatt, starring Neil Nitin Mukesh and Jacqueline Fernandez. The album featured 41 songs, with the involvement of various musicians, though Shankar Mahadevan was credited as the main artist for the album's production. The album was released under the record label Saregama on 30 April 2025.

== Background ==
Shankar Mahadevan composed the musical score for Hai Junoon! where he added that he was stunned by the vision for the series, admitting that it tries to dream big where there was a song for each emotions, moods, genres and characters, compiling it an "epic" album with more than 41 songs. Singer Shaan who contributed to the album, mentioned it a standout from the other regular singles and short soundtracks in film music scene, because of its scale and ambition. He considered it a throwback to the grand musical traditions of Indian cinema with a youthful and contemporary twist.

The album featured contributions from singers such as Shankar, Shaan, Sonu Nigam, Sunidhi Chauhan, Vishal Dadlani, Javed Ali, Mohit Chauhan, Divya Kumar, Nakash Aziz, Kanika Kapoor, Aditya Gadhvi, Siddharth Mahadevan and Shivam Mahadevan, amongst others with an ensemble of younger artists also performing. It accompanies a blend of multiple genres ranging from traditional and classical to contemporary albums. It also featured a new rendition of "Breathless" from Shankar's 1998 album of the same name. While most of the film's music accompanied remix songs and had credited to various composers, Shankar was credited as the main artist for the album.

== Release ==
The soundtrack for Hai Junoon! was released by Saregama on 30 April 2025. A musical live performance of the songs took place at the series' launch event on 14 May 2025 which was attended by the cast members.

== Track listing ==
No.	Title	Lyrics	Music	Singer(s)	Length
1.	"Lekar Hum Deewana Dil"	Hrutul, Majrooh Sultanpuri	Hrutul, R. D. Burman	Shivam Mahadevan, Tirth Thakkar, Yashita Sharma, Pragati Nagpal, 1080g, Asha Bhosle, Kishore Kumar	3:40
2.	"Hanjuan De Moti"	Pragati Nagpal	Shankar Mahadevan, Gourov Dasgupta	Pragati Nagpal, Abhay Jodhpurkar, Devshi Khanduri	2:50
3.	"Jab Chhaye"	Amit Khanna, Rishi Pathak	Sid Paul, Rajesh Roshan	Kanika Kapoor, Akanksha Sethi	2:45
4.	"Heer Ranjheya"	Kunwar Juneja	Shankar Mahadevan, Gourov Dasgupta	Deedar Kaur	2:24
5.	"Pag Ghungroo"	Anjaan, Firaag	Bappi Lahiri, Mayur Jumani	Mayur Jumani	2:18
6.	"Vibe Hai Mumbai"	Tanishk Nabar	Souumil Shringarpure, Shankar Mahadevan, Siddharth Mahadevan	Siddharth Mahadevan, Divya Kumar	3:06
7.	"Ek Main Aur Ek Tu"	Taranginee Gupta	Sameeruddin, Vishal–Shekhar	Sunidhi Chauhan	2:24
8.	"Jashn Hai Yaari Ka"	Nihar Bhave, Mihir Thatte, Shaurya Saxena, Darshan Desai, Sudipta Biwas	Mohit Shaurya, Shankar Mahadevan, Pin Drop Music	Maahi, Pragati Nagpal, Arjun Tanwar	1:19
9.	"Dance Koliwada"	Rajdeep Ghosh	Shankar Mahadevan, Samir Saptiskar	Nakash Aziz	2:40
10.	"Johnny Johnny"	Rajdeep Ghosh	Shankar Mahadevan, Rajdeep Ghosh	Arjun Tanwar, Akasa Singh	2:26
11.	"Nazron Se Mili"	Mihir Thatte, Nihar Bhave	Shankar Mahadevan, Mohit Shandilya	Maahi, Shaurya Saxena	2:33
12.	"Roop Suhana Lagta Hai" (Trap Mix)	Indeevar	A. R. Rahman	S. P. Balasubrahmanyam, K. S. Chithra	2:51
13.	"Le Chal Wahan" (Shaan's Version)	Anweshaa	Shankar Mahadevan, Akshay Menon	Shaan	2:40
14.	"O Haseena"	Majrooh Sultanpuri, Tanishk Nabar	R. D. Burman, Souumil Shringarpure, Siddharth Mahadevan	Tushar Joshi, Abhay Jodhpurkar, Yashita Sharma, Pragati Nagpal	3:30
15.	"Aazma Lenge Dum"	Big Sidley, Tanishk Nabar	Shankar Mahadevan, Souumil Shringarpure, Siddharth Mahadevan	Vishal Dadlani, Shankar Mahadevan, Big Sidley, Tanishk Nabar	3:33
16.	"Eena Meena Deeka"	Rajendra Krishan	Hrutul, C. Ramchandra	Antara Mitra, Hrutul	2:09
17.	"Gale Lagana"	Hrutul	Shankar Mahadevan, Hrutul	Sonu Nigam, Antara Mitra	4:15
18.	"Breathless"	Javed Akhtar	Shankar Mahadevan	Abhay Jodhpurkar, Shivam Mahadevan, Yashita Sharma, Pragati Nagpal, Nikon Mukherjee, Akasa Singh	2:11
19.	"Jazbe Ki Udaan"	Aayushi Desai	Shankar Mahadevan, Pathik Maniyar	Mohit Chauhan, Aayushi Desai	2:58
20.	"Mere Angane Mein"	Traditional	Kalyanji–Anandji, Souumil Shringarpure, Siddharth Mahadevan	Abhay Jodhpurkar	3:13
21.	"Sundar Baalak"	Rajdeep Ghosh	Shankar Mahadevan, Rajdeep Ghosh	Aditya Gadhvi	2:00
22.	"Milte Hain"	Rajdeep Ghosh	Shankar Mahadevan, Samir Saptiskar	Shivam Mahadevan, Pragati Nagpal, Yashita Sharma	2:20
23.	"Saat Samundar"	Anand Bakshi	Viju Shah, Rajesh Manthan	Shalmali Kholgade	2:45
24.	"Yaariyan"	Hassrat	Shankar Mahadevan, Rajesh Manthan	Javed Ali	2:35
25.	"Jumma Chumma"	Anand Bakshi, Tanishk Nabar	Laxmikant–Pyarelal, Souumil Shringarpure, Siddharth Mahadevan	Siddharth Mahadevan	2:46
26.	"Shor"	Rajdeep Ghosh	Shankar Mahadevan, Rajdeep Ghosh	Palash Sen	2:37
27.	"Hum The Woh Thi"	Majrooh Sultanpuri	S. D. Burman, Mayur Jumani	Abhay Jodhpurkar, Mangesh Punekar, Viraj Sane	2:32
28.	"What The Haqq"	Manisten	Shankar Mahadevan, Manisten	Manisten	2:29
29.	"Hum To Mohabbat"	Majrooh Sultanpuri, MK Roy	Ravi, Lazer X	Nakash Aziz	2:32
30.	"Mohan Ya Mohini"	Rajdeep Ghosh	1080g, Shebin Mathew, Shankar Mahadevan	Kavya Limaye	2:17
31.	"Hukkus Bukkus"	Nihir Bhave, Mihir Thatte, Shaurya Saxena, Darshan Desai, Sudipto Biswas	Mohit Shaurya, Shankar Mahadevan, Pin Drop Music	Shivam Mahadevan, Abhay Jodhpurkar, Yashita Sharma	2:19
32.	"Likha Hua Ye Pal"	Hrutul	Shankar Mahadevan, Hrutul	Tushar Joshi	2:00
33.	"Govind Bolo"	Ankit K. Sharma	Shankar Mahadevan, Rajdeep Ghosh	Abhay Jodhpurkar	3:53
34.	"Mehki Si Chandni"	Hrutul	Shankar Mahadevan, Hrutul	Shivam Mahadevan, Tirth Thakkar, Yashita Sharma, Pragati Nagpal	2:37
35.	"Nave Munde"	Vicky Gill	Lazer X, Shankar Mahadevan	M Vee, Lazer X	2:28
36.	"Fankari"	Tanishk Nabar	Shankar Mahadevan, Souumil Shringarpure, Siddharth Mahadevan	Shivam Mahadevan, Abhay Jodhpurkar	3:19
37.	"Preet Mori Satrangi"	Anweshaa	Shankar Mahadevan, Akshay Menon	Shivam Mahadevan, Abhay Jodhpurkar	2:22
38.	"Bheegi Hoon Main"	Rajdeep Ghosh	Shankar Mahadevan, Rajdeep Ghosh	Anusha Mani	2:36
39.	"Bas Kar"	Rajdeep Ghosh, Ankit K. Sharma	Laser X, Shankar Mahadevan	Manisten, Mikki, Metalpump, Vash Rover, Syntaxx	2:36
40.	"Jeena Yahan"	Shailendra, Rajdeep Ghosh, Ankit K. Sharma	Shankar–Jaikishan, Rajdeep Ghosh	Shaan, Anusha Mani	2:41
41.	"Le Chal Wahan" (Duet Version)	Anweshaa, Taranginee Gupta	Shankar Mahadevan, Akshay Menon	Shaan, Natalie Di Luccio	2:41
Total length:					1:49:58

== Reception ==
Hardika Gupta of NDTV wrote "The involvement of veteran singers like Shankar Mahadevan, Shaan, and Sonu Nigam enriches the soundtrack, although the frequent musical interludes sometimes disrupt the flow rather than enhance it." Nonika Singh of The Tribune wrote "Shankar Mahadevan, who has composed the soundtrack of the series, gets an ode, too, with 'Breathless' finding due mention".

Archika Khurana of The Times of India considered the music to be the heart of the show, adding that "The use of reimagined Bollywood classics like Jeena Yahan Marna Yahan and Mere Angne Mein lends the series a nostalgic charm". Deepa Gahlot of Rediff.com and Nirali Kanabar of Times Now considered Shankar's music as an important factor, with Gahlot admitting its role in catering to the Gen Z audience. Aishwarya Vasudevan of OTTPlay felt it "very difficult to keep up with the songs because they resemble High School Musical; the characters communicate with each other through song" and being a failed attempt, despite praising Shankar's work as a standalone.
