= Don (soundtrack) =

Soundtrack album by Shankar–Ehsaan–Loy
- Released: 26 August 2006
- Genres: Feature film soundtrack Electronic dance music
- Length: 38:12
- Label: T-Series
- Producer: Shankar–Ehsaan–Loy

Shankar–Ehsaan–Loy chronology
Kabhi Alvida Naa Kehna (2006)	Don (2006)	Jhoom Barabar Jhoom (2007)

Singles from Don
- 1. "Aaj Ki Raat" Released: 31 August 2006

Don is the soundtrack album to the 2006 Hindi film Don: The Chase Begins Again (a remake of 1978 film of the same name), directed by Farhan Akhtar, and starring Shahrukh Khan, Priyanka Chopra and Boman Irani. The music was released on 26 August 2006, on T-Series. It was one of the best-selling Bollywood soundtracks of the year, with 1.5 million units sold in India.

== Overview ==
The film has seven songs composed by Shankar–Ehsaan–Loy with lyrics written by Javed Akhtar. Two of the tracks from the original, "Khaike Paan Banaraswala" and "Yeh Mera Dil", composed by the duo of Kalyanji Anandji, were redone for the movie. Shahrukh Khan has rapped in the retro track "Khaike Paan Banaraswala", the remix of the old classic, who rendered the song along with Udit Narayan. "Yeh Mera Dil", sung by Sunidhi Chauhan, is the second remix of the album, which was originally sung by Asha Bhosle.

The song "Mourya Re" sung by Shankar Mahadevan is a Ganpati song set big in Mumbai. "Aaj Ki Raat", sung by Alisha Chinai, Mahalakshmi Iyer & Sonu Nigam, has a trendy 1980s club feel to it. The title song, "Main Hoon Don" which falls in a rave, techno, industrial genre, is rendered by Shaan. The "Don Revisited" track was composed by MIDIval Punditz and the remix of the title track was done by DJ Randolph.

== Track listing ==
Note: The songs “Khaike Paan Banaraswala” and “Ye Mera Dil” are not included in the album and are not available on any third-party music sites due to copyright issues.

No.	Title	Singer(s)	Length
1.	"Main Hoon Don"	Shaan	5:30
2.	"Mourya Re"	Shankar Mahadevan	5:52
3.	"Aaj Ki Raat"	Alisha Chinai, Mahalaxmi Iyer & Sonu Nigam	6:08
4.	"Khaike Paan Banaraswala (Not included in the album)"	Udit Narayan & Shah Rukh Khan	5:24
5.	"Ye Mera Dil (Not included in the album)"	Sunidhi Chauhan	4:40
6.	"Don - The Theme"	Shahrukh Khan	4:07
7.	"Don Revisited"	MIDIval Punditz	4:46
8.	"Main Hoon Don" (Funcinternational Mix)	Shaan	5:13
Total length:			38:12

== Release ==
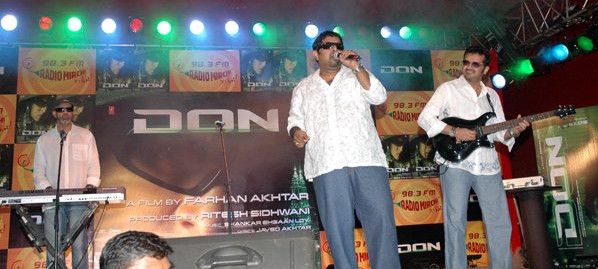
SEL performing the songs at the music launch

The music was released on 26 August 2006, at the Inorbit Mall, Malad, Mumbai. Over 30,000 people attended the function.

RJ Harsh of Radio Mirchi was the host of the event. The programs started off by Shankar, Ehsaan and Loy singing "Mourya Re", and gave a brief intro about the album. Isha Koppikar, who plays the role of Anita in the film, performed onstage, and later launched the music with Shahrukh Khan as the lead actress Priyanka Chopra was unable to attend the function. Shahrukh also performed the rap segment from "Khaike Paan Banaraswala" and delivered some dialogues from the film.

== Reception ==
Professional ratings
Review scores
Source	Rating
Bollywood Hungama	4/5 stars
Rediff	2/5 stars

The music received generally favorable reviews from critics. Joginder Tuteja of Bollywood Hungama in his four star review, said, "Shankar Ehsaan Loy do exceedingly well with the soundtrack of 'Don – The Chase Begins Again' and establish their supremacy as the composer trio who can give their own even while rearranging the songs from the past, as seen in 'Khaike Paan' and 'Ye Mera Dil'. While 'Aaj Ki Raat' sits pretty at the top for its innovative appeal, 'Khaike' is a sure shot chartbuster for all generations and 'Main Hoon Don' makes the proceedings exciting, the theme instrumentals too create a great impact and take the proceedings on a fast track." The Rediff review read, "This lavish enterprise has a little bit of everything. An eclectic mix of old, new and everything in between; Don is an unusual presentation of old wine in new bottle."

The music became extremely popular among the public and topped the music charts. The music sold over 1.5 million units in India.

== In popular culture ==
The song "Aaj Ki Raat" was included in the Academy Award-winning soundtrack Slumdog Millionaire (2008) by A. R. Rahman. It features in the climax of the film Slumdog Millionaire.

== See also ==
- Don 2 (soundtrack)
