= Nine (Shankar Mahadevan album) =

Studio album by Shankar Mahadevan
- Released: September 2003
- Genre: Bollywood/classical
- Label: Saregama

Shankar Mahadevan chronology
| Breathless (1998) | Nine (2003) |

Nine is a 2003 second studio album by Shankar Mahadevan, in which he explores nine "moods", one in each song.

== Track listing ==
All lyrics are written by Javed Akhtar; all music is composed by Shankar Mahadevan.

| No. | Title | Length |
|---|---|---|
| 1. | "O Sahibaa" (Joy) | 7:11 |
| 2. | "Dil Nange Pair Jaise" (Sadness) | 4:28 |
| 3. | "Hum Khoye Khoye Hai" (Love) | 6:20 |
| 4. | "Tezab Ugalta Hai" (Jealousy) | 5:16 |
| 5. | "Maine Ek Khwab Dekha" (Hope) | 4:34 |
| 6. | "Sain Sain Chali Hawa" (Fear) | 4:42 |
| 7. | "Aye Fiza" (Peace) | 6:15 |
| 8. | "Jism Mein Kaise Jaadu" (Passion) | 5:36 |
| 9. | "Jazbaat Ki Sau Rang Hai" (Jazbaat) | 4:09 |
