= O... Saya =

Song by A. R. Rahman and M.I.A.

from the album: Slumdog Millionaire: Music from the Motion Picture
- Released: 25 November 2008
- Recorded: 2008
- Studio: Panchathan Record Inn and AM Studios (Chennai, India)
- Length: 3:33
- Label: Interscope
- Songwriters: A.R. Rahman; M.I.A.
- Producer: A.R. Rahman

"O... Saya" (ओ साया, transl. O Shadow) is a song from the soundtrack of the 2008 film Slumdog Millionaire. It was composed by Indian musician A. R. Rahman and British rapper M.I.A., both of whom performed on the recording.

== Song information ==
Rahman became interested in M.I.A. after listening to her debut album Arular, and upon meeting Rahman in the recording sessions of her follow-up album, the singer said she was a big fan of his work. Director Danny Boyle suggested M.I.A. work with Rahman on a piece for the score of the film, and even though she had announced a retirement earlier at Bonnaroo Festival, she said the offer could not be refused. Rahman was halfway through his score when M.I.A. met him in London, and both eventually shared initial ideas. The song was then composed through continuous e-mailing between Rahman in India and M.I.A. in England, and once he recorded his parts, M.I.A. contributed her vocals from New York, where she had moved. According to the digital music sheet published at musicnotes.com, the song is written in the key of B minor, with a moderately fast tempo.

The song was nominated for an Academy Award for Best Original Song at the 81st Academy Awards, but eventually lost to the song "Jai Ho", also from Slumdog Millionaire. M.I.A. said the nomination was an honor, stating "Maybe I can afford to book Dave Chappelle at the baby shower now." At the awards ceremony, the song was performed by Rahman, surrounded by dancers and taiko drums. M.I.A. expressed interest in performing, even though she had just given birth, but ultimately declined once she learned only the performance would last for only one minute.

"O... Saya" charted in the Billboard Hot 100 at 93, and the Canadian Hot 100 at 68.

The song was featured during the 2009 NFL draft.

== Chart performance ==
Chart	Peak position
Canadian Hot 100	68
U.S. Billboard Hot 100	93
