= Breathless (Shankar Mahadevan album) =

1998 studio album by Shankar Mahadevan

Studio album by Shankar Mahadevan feat. Javed Akhtar
- Released: 15 October 1998; 26 years ago
- Genre: Indi-pop, Indian fusion
- Length: 41:04
- Label: Saregama
- Producer: Shankar Mahadevan

Shankar Mahadevan feat. Javed Akhtar chronology
Breathless (1998)	Nine (2003)

Breathless is the 1998 debut Indi-pop studio album by Indian singer-composer Shankar Mahadevan with the tracks written by lyricist Javed Akhtar. It was the album that first made Shankar Mahadevan famous.

The title track "Breathless", is a steady stream of a song that goes on without a break, stanzas or verse. However, Shankar didn't sing in one continuous breath. The song's audibly unbroken flow is achieved through studio editing and clever manipulation of the recording. Shankar has confirmed that he recorded different sections of the song and then pieced them together in post-production. He revealed multiple times that it's a concept song in a raga with free improvisation. During the writing, Shankar gave a meter to Javed for writing the lyrics while catching the meter and Javed gave him four sheets of the lyrics which looked like a magazine article with which Shankar felt challenged.

The final track "Breathless (The Reprise)", is a similar song whose story takes off from where "Breathless" ended.

The album won the award for Best Non-film album at the 1998 Screen Awards.

== Track listing ==
All lyrics are written by Javed Akhtar.

No.	Title	Length
1.	"Breathless"	3:05
2.	"Tu Paas Hai"	6:20
3.	"Tere Khayalon Se"	5:35
4.	"Mano Ya Na Mano"	5:30
5.	"Jane Kya Hua"	6:11
6.	"Koi Nahin Hai"	5:21
7.	"Ghul Raha Hai Sara Manzar"	6:02
8.	"Breathless (The Reprise)"	2:58

== Reception ==
The music album was a huge success, selling over 300,000 copies and topped all major music charts in India for about 10 straight weeks.

== Music video ==
The music video of the title song "Breathless" was directed by Farhan Akhtar and his sister Zoya Akhtar. Shankar himself appears in the video with actress Renu Desai. This was the beginning of a long association, as Shankar, along with Ehsaan Noorani and Loy Mendonsa (as Shankar–Ehsaan–Loy), went on to score music for all of the films directed by Farhan and Zoya Akhtar.

== In popular culture ==
- The song appears in the 2002 Indian Assamese-language film Tumiye Mor Kalpanar.
- An adaptation of the song appears as the jingle in a series of advertisements for Pakistani biscuit brand Sooper.
- The title song has inspired many covers.

== Recreation ==
In 2018, Mahadevan recreated the song to highlight the programmes and initiatives of the Narendra Modi-led government.

== See also ==
- Shankar Mahadevan
- Shankar–Ehsaan–Loy
- Farhan Akhtar
- Zoya Akhtar
