= Shankar–Ehsaan–Loy =

Indian musical trio

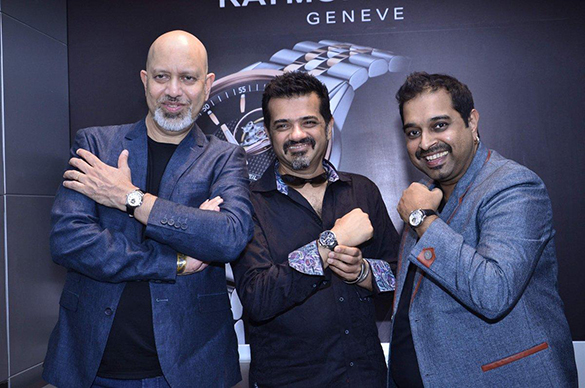
- Loy Mendonsa, Ehsaan Noorani and Shankar Mahadevan in September 2014

Background information
- Also known as: S-E-L
- Origin: Mumbai, Maharashtra, India
- Genres: Film score; Indian classical; Rock; world music
- Occupations: music director; instrumentalist; composer; music conductor; film scores; film score composer
- Instruments: Guitar; keyboard; synthesizer; santoor; sarod
- Years active: 1997–present
- Label: SEL Songs
- Members: Shankar Mahadevan; Ehsaan Noorani; Loy Mendonsa
- Website: www.shankarehsaanloy.com

Shankar–Ehsaan–Loy is an Indian musical trio consisting of Shankar Mahadevan, Ehsaan Noorani, and Loy Mendonsa. They have composed music for over 50 soundtracks across five languages: Hindi, Tamil, Malayalam, Telugu, Marathi and English. Amongst the most critically acclaimed Indian musicians, the trio have won numerous awards, including National Film Awards, Filmfare Awards, and IIFA Awards.

They are often referred to as the Amar Akbar Anthony (AAA) of the Hindi film music industry. They are known for their compositions in Dil Chahta Hai (2001), Kal Ho Naa Ho (2003), Kabhi Alvida Naa Kehna (2006), My Name Is Khan (2010), Zindagi Na Milegi Dobara (2011) and Dil Dhadakne Do (2015).

== Members ==
=== Shankar Mahadevan ===
Shankar Mahadevan, the main vocalist of the trio, was born and brought up in Chembur, a suburb of Mumbai, in a Tamil family from Kerala. He learned Hindustani classical music and Carnatic music in his childhood and started playing the veena at the age of five. He studied under Shrinivas Khale, a popular Marathi music composer. After graduating in 1988 with a degree in Software Engineering from Ramrao Adik Institute of Technology in Navi Mumbai under the auspices of Mumbai University, he worked as a software engineer on Oracle Version Six. After working for a while for Leading Edge Systems, Shankar ventured into the field of music. He earned his first award as a playback singer in a Tamil movie, collaborating with A. R. Rahman and winning a National Film Award for his song in Kandukondain Kandukondain. A prominent star in Tamil cinema, he gained further recognition upon the release of his first music album, Breathless, in 1998. In 2019 he was felicitated with the Padma Shri Award for his contribution to Film Music. He has two sons, Siddharth and Shivam Mahadevan, both of whom are singers as well.

=== Ehsaan Noorani ===
Ehsaan Noorani is the guitarist of Shankar–Ehsaan–Loy. He studied music with Bismarck Rodrigues from a young age. Prior to going abroad to study further music at GIT (Los Angeles), Ehsaan was an integral part of two local bands in Mumbai, Pegasus and Crosswinds. Ehsaan returned to Mumbai and was in demand for his musical skills in composing jingles, working for all the top composers of the time. Until the day Magic Box productions approached him to compose the jingle for Sona Spices, and that marked the beginning of Ehsaan's independent journey as a composer of jingles in India.

Ehsaan was approached by Mukul S. Anand to compose the music for his film Dus, and he in turn asked Shankar and Loy to join him in composing the music for the film. Dus never made it to the big screen, due to the death of the director.

Ehsaan is the only Indian musician to have endorsed a signature line, 'The Ehsaan Noorani Fender Squier' signature series, for Fender guitars, one of the largest and most reputed guitar manufacturers in the world.

=== Loy Mendonsa ===
Loy Mendonsa plays the piano, bass guitar, and harmonica and is currently learning to play the trumpet. Loy was a genius music teacher for a school in New Delhi, when he was invited to write the music for the show Quiz Time by Siddharth Basu, who gave him his first break. Loy then went on to compose the title track for The World This Week and for the Shahrukh Khan TV serial Fauji. Loy moved to Bombay and met Ehsaan in 1989, and together they composed several ad jingles. His daughter Alyssa Mendonsa is a playback singer who has lent her voice to their songs.

== History ==
=== Formation (1985–96) ===
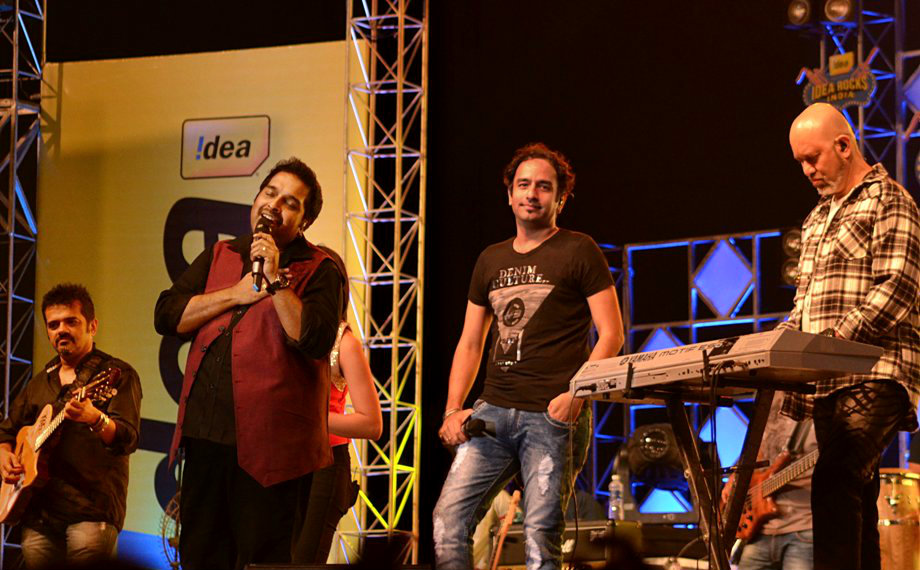
Shankar–Ehsaan–Loy at Idea Rocks India, Bangalore (6 April 2012)

Shankar, Ehsaan and Loy came up from the ranks of the non-film music scene, performing rock, blues, jazz and pop before entering the film music industry. Shankar Mahadevan, a software engineer, worked on Oracle Version Six and studied Western, Hindustani and Carnatic classical music. He made his debut with the 1985 Marathi film Vahinichi Maya. A leading playback singer with Pukar, Sapnay and Biwi No.1 to his credit, he also composed Breathless.

Ehsaan Noorani studied music at the Musicians' Institute in Los Angeles and worked with the likes of Ronnie Desai, Laxmikant–Pyarelal, Kalyanji-Anandji and Louis Banks. He composed Alien Desire, did several jingles and like Loy, was part of a blues-and-acid jazz band. Loy Mendonsa is trained in Western classical and also learnt the rudiments of Indian classical music. He performed with several group bands and plays (Godspell, West Side Story, Jesus Christ Superstar) and composed jingles and signature tunes (Fauji, The World This Week).

Ehsaan was doing jingles and Loy was in Delhi before the union. Loy was writing for television then. The show Quiz Time was his first work and Siddharth Basu gave him his first break. Then he did Prannoy Roy's The World This Week. A few more shows came along and he also did theatre and Shahrukh Khan's Fauji. Loy had also worked as keyboardist with A. R. Rahman and Shankar had sung many famous tracks for him. In 1989, Ehsaan met Loy, who was working for Ranjit Barot, an ad film composer. From then on, they joined and composed several ad jingles together. Later, Ehsaan and Loy met Shankar when he was roped in by Ranjit Barot to sing for the Pepsi ad directed by Mukul Anand. Since then, they started to compose for ads as a trio.

=== Early years (1997–2001) ===
Shankar–Ehsaan–Loy were to make their debut as composers in Mukul Anand's film Dus. Director Anand wanted Ehsaan to compose the music for the film, but he insisted that Shankar and Loy work with him and Anand agreed. The film remained incomplete after Anand's death, though the album was released later in 1999. After Dus, they had composed music for a couple of films like Rockford and Bhopal Express, but all of them went unnoticed. Their entry to mainstream cinema was with Vidhu Vinod Chopra's Mission Kashmir, which was a musical hit and earned the trio a place in the Bollywood film industry. They also earned IIFA nominations for the same.

=== Dil Chahta Hai and rise to fame (2001–04) ===
In 2001, they made their film debut in Tamil film industry, as Kamal Haasan signed them to compose for Aalavandhan. The music sold well due to the hype surrounding the movie, though the movie itself was a dud in the box-office. The turning point of their career as music directors though, was Dil Chahta Hai, which was the debut film of Farhan Akhtar as a director. Initially, A. R. Rahman was considered to do the music, but he backed out due to other assignments. Then the trio composed a title track for the film, which Farhan liked, and he signed them for the film. The film won widespread critical acclaim and went on to attain cult status among audiences, and also earned them their first nomination for the Filmfare Award for Best Music Director. This marked the beginning of the trio's friendship with Farhan Akhtar and long-term association with Excel Entertainments.

Post Dil Chahta Hai, they composed music for several small budget films like Yeh Kya Ho Raha Hai?, Nayee Padosan and Ek Aur Ek Gyarah, where all of them went unnoticed as all the movies were panned by the critics. They also had two big ventures, Honey Irani's Armaan and Rohan Sippy's Kuch Naa Kaho, which yet again, failed to impress both critics and audiences – though their work in Armaan was lauded by critics.

=== Kal Ho Naa Ho and First National Award (2004–06) ===
Following Dil Chahta Hai, their next big venture was Dharma Productions' Kal Ho Naa Ho, directed by Nikhil Advani. The album received a highly positive response when the film was released and it became one of the best selling Indian music albums of the year and was the highest seller album of 2003. The soundtrack won numerous awards including the National Film Award for Best Music Direction and their first Filmfare Award for Best Music Director.

The year 2005 saw them collaborate with Shaad Ali for Bunty Aur Babli, as his first choice, A. R. Rahman, was busy with other assignments. The soundtrack, despite the initial mixed reaction from various critics, became immensely popular among the public, and went on to win several awards including their second Filmfare Award for Best Music Director. The song "Kajra Re" featuring Aishwarya Rai, Abhishek Bachchan and Amitabh Bachchan became a rage among the listeners.

In 2006, they reteamed with Dharma Productions for Karan Johar's musical romantic drama Kabhi Alvida Naa Kehna. The soundtrack and background score of the film received universal acclaim and became the second highest-selling Indian music album of the year. Their next album that year was Farhan Akhtar's Don: The Chase Begins Again. They composed seven songs, including two versions of "Yeh Mera Dil" and "Khaike Paan Banaraswala", from Don (1978). The track "Aaj Ki Raat" was also included in the Academy Award-winning soundtrack Slumdog Millionaire. The soundtracks of Kabhi Alvida Naa Kehna and Don: The Chase Begins Again earned them several nominations at various award ceremonies, including their fourth and fifth nomination for the Filmfare Award for Best Music Director.

=== Later career (2007–present) ===
2007 was arguably the best year of their career. The year started off with Nikhil Advani's multistarrer Salaam-e-Ishq, which was lauded by critics and music lovers alike, and went on to rule the music charts. The music was praised by the movie critics too, despite the movie itself receiving mixed-to-negative responses. Same was the fate of their next release, Jhoom Barabar Jhoom. Despite the music getting positive reviews and becoming quite a sensation among listeners, the movie failed to make a mark. However, this pattern was broken by their next release, Akshay Kumar's Heyy Babyy, where both the film and the music were commercial successes.

In August, the album Johnny Gaddaar was released, which was co-produced by the trio and Adlabs, first of its kind in the history of Bollywood. Both the music and movie received overwhelmingly positive reviews from critics.

Their last album of the year, Aamir Khan's Taare Zameen Par, was well received by critics, and both the film and the music got a cult status among audiences. Most of their albums for this year made the top 10 lists of all major websites.

In 2008, their major release was Rock On!! – which was a cult favourite and rage among the audience, and went on to become a huge commercial success, despite the initial cold reaction from the critics. The soundtrack earned them their sixth nomination for the Filmfare Award for Best Music Director. Luck By Chance was their last album of 2008, which garnered positive reviews from both Indian and international critics.

In 2009 they scored music for the Salman Khan and Ajay Devgan starrer London Dreams. Although the music received favorable reviews, the movie didn't fare well in the box office. They also composed the music of Ayan Mukherjee's debut film Wake Up Sid starring Ranbir Kapoor and Konkona Sen Sharma along with Amit Trivedi. The music, especially the title track, topped charts, and received widespread critical acclaim. The soundtrack earned them their seventh nomination for the Filmfare Award for Best Music Director.

Their first soundtrack of 2010 was the Karan Johar's social drama My Name Is Khan. The soundtrack blends western bar blues and techno sounds with Indian classical styles such as Sufi and Hindustani. The soundtrack was well received, and they won several awards including the Screen Award for Best Music Director, the Big Star Award For Best Music Director, and the IIFA Award for Best Background Score, in addition to their eighth nomination for the Filmfare Award for Best Music Director. This was followed by Farhan Akhtar's Karthik Calling Karthik which despite getting mixed reviews from critics, did very well on the charts. The track "Uff Teri Adaa" marked the debut of Loy's daughter Alyssa Mendonsa and became immensely popular. The next major release of the year was Sajid Khan's Housefull, which received generally favourable reviews from reviewers and the track "Oh Girl" by Alyssa and Tarun Sagar topped the charts. Ali Zafar's Tere Bin Laden then followed, of which the song "Ullu Da Pattha" became a rage. The phrase was hence used for the promotion of the movie. Their final release of 2010, was Dharma Productions' We Are Family starring Kajol, Kareena Kapoor and Arjun Rampal. The album received a mixed response, and the film was only an average success at the box office.

2011 began with Nikhil Advani's Akshay Kumar-starrer Patiala House, which was well received by all mainstream critics, though the movie didn't quite get such an enthralling reception. The following release, Excel Entertainment's Game, was met with poor reviews. the movie itself was met with extremely negative reception from the critics and turned out to be a disaster at the box office. They also scored music for Walt Disney's maiden Indian venture, Zokkomon. The music and the film failed to generate any positive buzz.

Their first international venture, the UK movie West is West, was released on 18 February 2011. The music was well received by almost all the reviewers, despite the movie itself receiving reviews ranging from mixed to positive.

Their major release of the year, Zoya Akhtar's multistarrer Zindagi Na Milegi Dobara, was met with universal critical acclaim and opened well in the charts. However, the year ended on a low note for them with Farhan Akhtar's much-anticipated Don 2 receiving mixed response from the critics. Their work on the former earned them their ninth nomination for the Filmfare Award for Best Music Director.

The trio had three releases in 2012. The bigger of their biggest releases, Kamal Haasan's controversial film Vishwaroopam, went on to become a major financial success. Their other release, Chittagong, was met with critical praise, and won Shankar the 2013 National Film Award for Best Male Playback Singer, and Prasoon Joshi the National Film Award for Best Lyrics. They had also composed for the animated film Delhi Safari, whose title song was shortlisted for nominations in the Original Song category for the 85th Academy Awards.

In 2014, they collaborated with Dharma Productions for the romantic drama 2 States (2014), which earned them high critical praise and their third Filmfare Award for Best Music Director.

In 2015, they composed the soundtrack and background score for Zoya Akhtar's Dil Dhadakne Do which earned them their eleventh nomination for the Filmfare Award for Best Music Director.

In 2016, their work on the soundtrack of Rakeysh Omprakash Mehra's Mirzya earned them their twelfth nomination for the Filmfare Award for Best Music Director.

After a year-long hiatus, they composed music for the spy thriller Raazi (2018) starring Alia Bhatt and Vicky Kaushal and directed by Meghna Gulzar for which they received their thirteenth nomination for the Filmfare Award for Best Music Director.

In 2019, it was announced that the trio would be making their debut in the digital streaming space by composing the soundtrack and background score for an upcoming web series named Bandish Bandits. They also composed songs for multilingual film Saaho in four languages starring Prabhas of Baahubali fame.

In mid-2018, the trio was signed to compose for Prithviraj Sukumaran's Malayalam-language period epic Kaaliyan which was then put on hold for various reasons. Meanwhile, in Hindi, they also composed for another period film, Manikarnika: The Queen of Jhansi, but backed out of the Amitabh Bachchan-Aamir Khan-starrer Thugs of Hindostan due to scheduling conflicts.

In 2020, they composed the soundtrack of Meghna Gulzar's Chhapaak which earned them their fourteenth nomination for the Filmfare Award for Best Music Director. In 2026, they made their debut in Malayalam cinema as music composer with the film Chatha Pacha: The Ring of Rowdies.

== Other works ==
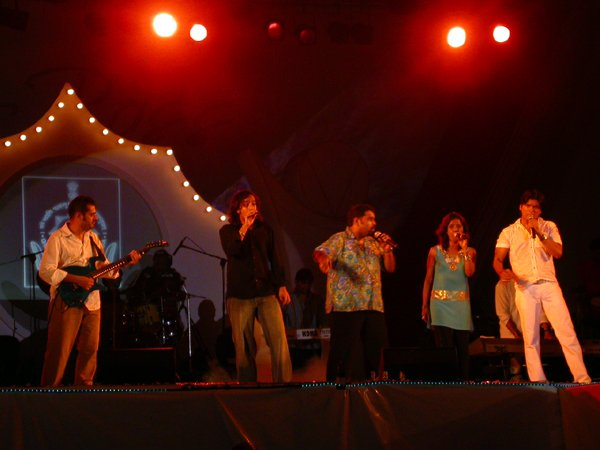
Shankar–Ehsaan–Loy performing at IFFI 2006

Shankar–Ehsaan–Loy have been involved in several projects aside from films. Ehsaan, Loy and Farhad had formed the band Instant Karma, and they released redone versions of R. D. Burman and other composers over two albums in 2002. They have also composed music for several jingles, signature tunes for corporates including Reliance and Aircel, and public awareness campaigns. In 2010, the trio wrote music for the first ever Bollywood musical, Zangoora.

In 2011, they composed the official anthem for ICC Cricket World Cup 2011, titled De Ghuma Ke, which became highly popular among youths and cricket enthusiasts within days of its release.

In 2004, they performed for a concert organised by The Indian Express held in celebration of the Indian democracy, which was also attended by Aamir Khan, Farhan Akhtar and other celebrities. They organised a concert at IFFI titled Salaam Boss (Salute to the Boss) in 2006 paying tribute to the legendary music composer R.D. Burman. Later in 2008, they performed for the Live Earth India Concert to help light homes with solar energy along with several other celebrities like Jon Bon Jovi. They have also performed a worldwide tour in 2010, called Inspiration: Aman Ki Aasha Tour, which began in New Jersey, United States. The tour was a major success, garnering overwhelming response from the audience. They performed at UK for the first time, in the Asia Rocks! concert at London's Royal Albert Hall in September 2011. In 2018, they embarked on a Tour of the US & Canada along with Farhan Akhtar.

== Frequent collaborators ==
They have composed music for most of the films produced by Excel Entertainment, founded by Farhan Akhtar and Ritesh Sidhwani. They have also associated frequently with Dharma Productions, under Karan Johar. Their other notable collaborations have been with directors like Shaad Ali, Rakeysh Omprakash Mehra, Zoya Akhtar, and Meghna Gulzar.

Most of the lyrics for the songs composed by the trio have been penned by Gulzar and Javed Akhtar. However, they have also frequently associated with lyricists like Prasoon Joshi and Amitabh Bhattacharya.

== Legacy and musical style ==
Each member of the trio contributes distinct musical strengths: (Shankar Mahadevan) draws on both Carnatic and Hindustani vocal traditions, (Ehsaan Noorani) brings influences from Western rock and guitar-based styles, and (Loy Mendonsa) adds experience in composition, arrangement, and the use of electronic instruments, including synthesizers. Together, their combined backgrounds support an approach to music production and fusion.

Academy Award-winning lyricist Gulzar described the music of the trio as "a sensible synthesis of popularity and class". Composer duo Vishal–Shekhar considers them as an inspiration. Upcoming filmmakers Pavel Singh and Shantum Singh consider the trio as their inspiration while upcoming musicians Arko Mukherjee, Rajkumar Sengupta and Debopratim Bakshi of the Friends of Fusion band from Kolkata said "We have been influenced by Shankar–Ehsaan–Loy, so we mix our own elements to their composition. It's our way of paying homage to them."

The trio is known for launching the career of numerous singers, including Mahalakshmi Iyer, Anusha Mani, Caralisa Monteiro, Dominique Cerejo, and Hard Kaur.

== Awards ==
Shankar–Ehsaan–Loy were the recipients of several awards, including three Filmfare Awards (Bunty Aur Babli, Kal Ho Naa Ho, 2 States), three IIFA Awards (Kal Ho Naa Ho, Bunty Aur Babli, 2 States), three Screen Awards (Dil Chahta Hai, Bunty Aur Babli, My Name Is Khan), the Filmfare R. D. Burman Award for New Music Talent and two MTV Immies Awards. In 2004, they received the National Film Award for Best Music Direction for Kal Ho Naa Ho.

In 2010, they were honoured with the Years of Excellence at the Jack Daniel's Annual Rock Awards at Hard Rock Café, Mumbai.

== Other ventures ==
=== Business ===
SEL co-produced the album Johnny Gaddaar, with Adlabs, first time ever in the history of Hindi film music. In 2010, they also launched their own record label, SEL Songs and an iPhone app, making them the first Hindi film composers to do so.

They provide celebrity endorsement for various brands, including Sennheiser, Philips Consumer Lifestyle and Radio One 94.3.

=== Charitable causes ===
Shankar–Ehsaan–Loy have been involved in many charitable activities. They composed the music for an album Haath Se Haath Mila as the part of an AIDS Awareness campaign launched by BBC World Service Trust. In 2007, they performed in Chennai for a concert organised by The Shakti Foundation – For the Physically Challenged to raise funds. Organized by Farhan Akhtar, they lead the Rock concert for raising funds for a paediatric medical camp in Bihar in 2008. They also launched the You Know You Can Rock Harder G3 Challenge talent hunt in search of the most talented rock band in the country in the same year. They had performed for a fund raising concert for the NGO Alert India which fights against leprosy in 2009.

== Discography ==
- Shool (1999)
- Mission Kashmir (2000)
- Aalavandhan (2001) (Tamil film)
- Dil Chahta Hai (2001)
- Kal Ho Naa Ho (2003)
- Armaan (2003)
- Kuch Naa Kaho (2004)
- Kyun! Ho Gaya Na... (2004)
- Lakshya (2004)
- Bunty Aur Babli (2005)
- Kabhi Alvida Naa Kehna (2006)
- Don: The Chase Begins Again (2006)
- Salaam-e-Ishq (2007)
- Jhoom Barabar Jhoom (2007)
- Heyy Babyy (2007)
- Johnny Gaddaar (2007)
- Taare Zameen Par (2007)
- Rock On!! (2008)
- Luck By Chance (2008)
- Wake Up Sid (2009)
- Konchem Ishtam Konchem Kashtam (2009) (Telugu Film)
- London Dreams (2009)
- Yavarum Nalam (2009) (Tamil Film, simultaneously shot in Hindi as 13B: Fear Has a New Address)
- My Name Is Khan (2010)
- Karthik Calling Karthik (2010)
- We Are Family (2010)
- Housefull (2010)
- Patiala House (2011)
- Aarakshan (2011)
- Zindagi Na Milegi Dobara (2011)
- Don 2: The King is Back (2011)
- Chittagong (2012)
- Delhi Safari (2012)
- Vishwaroopam (2013) (Tamil Film)
- Bhaag Milkha Bhaag (2013)
- D-Day (2013)
- One by Two (2014)
- Darr @ the Mall (2014)
- 2 States (2014)
- Kill Dil (2014)
- Dil Dhadakne Do (2015)
- Katti Batti (2015)
- Ghayal Once Again (2016)
- Mirzya (2016)
- Rock On!! 2 (2016)
- Raazi (2018)
- Soorma (2018)
- Kaaliyan (2020) (Malayalam film)
- Manikarnika: The Queen of Jhansi (2019)
- Saaho (2019)
- The Zoya Factor (2019)
- Chhapaak (2020)
- Panga (2020)
- It's My Life (2020)
- Toofan (2021)
- Bunty Aur Babli 2 (2021)
- Dhaakad (2022)
- Samrat Prithviraj (2022)
- Sam Bahadur (2023)
- Akaal: The Unconquered (2025)
