= Shankar–Ehsaan–Loy Inspiration: Aman Ki Aasha tour =

2010 concert tour by Shankar–Ehsaan–Loy

- World tour by Shankar–Ehsaan–Loy
- Promotional poster for the Inspiration Tour 2010
- Location: United States, Canada
- Start date: July 17, 2010
- End date: August 7, 2010
- No. of shows: 10

Shankar–Ehsaan–Loy Inspiration: Aman Ki Aasha tour is the first world tour by Indian musical trio Shankar–Ehsaan–Loy. The tour started off on 17 July 2010, at the Izod Center in New Jersey, US. Gunjan Lamba was the choreographer of the tour. The tour featured major singers from India and Pakistan, like Mahalaxmi Iyer, Shafqat Amanat Ali, Richa Sharma, Raman Mahadevan and Anusha Mani.

== Tour dates ==
Date	City	Country	Venue
July 17, 2010	East Rutherford	United States	Izod Center
July 18, 2010	Toronto	Canada	Air Canada Centre
July 23, 2010	Rosemont	United States	Rosemont Theatre
July 24, 2010	Oakland	United States	Oakland Arena
July 30, 2010	Washington, D.C.	United States	DAR Constitution Hall
July 31, 2010	Garland	United States	Garland Special Events Center
August 1, 2010	Los Angeles	United States	LA Sports Arena
August 6, 2010	Cypress	United States	Richard E. Berry Educational Support Center
August 7, 2010	Atlanta	United States	Atlanta Civic Center
August 8, 2010	Worcester	United States	Hanover Theatre for the Performing Arts

== Reception ==
The tour was a huge success and garnered extremely positive reviews from the blogosphere. Kishore Vikaas of MTV Iggy in his review, said that hundreds from Pennsylvania, New Jersey, New York and beyond were already lining up for the show and summed up, "Wear comfortable shoes because it’s inevitable that you’ll end up dancing in the aisles at some point". Another blogger, Richa, called it an amazing experience to remember while Preeti of Rants & Revelations described it as A wonderful evening and remarked that Shankar Mahadevan stole the show.
