= Slumdog Millionaire (soundtrack) =

Slumdog Millionaire: Music from the Motion Picture

Soundtrack album by A. R. Rahman
- Released: 25 November 2008
- Recorded: Panchathan Record Inn and AM Studios
- Length: 51:01
- Labels: Celador; N.E.E.T.; Interscope; T-Series
- Producer: A. R. Rahman

A. R. Rahman chronology
Ghajini (2008)	Slumdog Millionaire (2008)	Delhi-6 (2009)

Slumdog Millionaire: Music from the Motion Picture is the soundtrack album of the British drama film of the same name, directed by Danny Boyle. The original score and songs were composed by A. R. Rahman, who planned the score in two months and completed it in 20 days, a far shorter time period than usual.

The soundtrack won the Golden Globe Award for Best Original Score, BAFTA Award for Best Film Music, and two Academy Awards, one for Best Original Music Score and the other for Best Original Song for "Jai Ho". The soundtrack has also won two Grammy Awards, one for the album itself and another for the song "Jai Ho". The latter song would be reworked by Ron Fair and The Pussycat Dolls into an English language adaptation "Jai Ho! (You Are My Destiny)" which would go on to become an international hit for the group.

The soundtrack sold over two million units worldwide.

== Development ==
Rahman has stated that he was aiming for "mixing modern India and the old India" with the music, but that the film and soundtrack "isn't about India or Indian culture. The story could happen anywhere." The film's director Danny Boyle, who "hated sentiment" and told Rahman "Never put a cello in my film", wanted a "pulsey" score. Rahman appreciated that Boyle liked how Indian films mix music, saying the director wanted "edgy, upfront" music that did not suppress sound. Composing pieces to fit the images, he noted: "There's not many cues in the film. Usually a big film has 130 cues. This had just seventeen or eighteen: the end credits, beginning credits." Describing the music as one of the parts he liked most in the film, Boyle wanted to include M.I.A.'s "Paper Planes" from early on in production on the score, which appears along with an original track Rahman composed, "O...Saya," featuring the artist. M.I.A., who Rahman described as a "powerhouse" gave brief film notes on some scenes to Boyle upon request during editing. The track "Ringa Ringa" was done as a tribute to the famous Laxmikant–Pyarelal song "Choli Ke Peeche" from the 1993 movie Khalnayak. Rahman has attributed part of the success of the film soundtrack to Arulpragasam.

The soundtrack for the film was released on M.I.A.'s N.E.E.T. label.

== Chart performance ==
The soundtrack gained popularity after the performance of this movie on the Golden Globe Awards. It also rose up the Billboard 200 albums chart rising from 56 to 16 for the issue of 31 January 2009, later peaking at #4 on the chart. For the issue of 7 March 2009, the album again rebounded from 48 to 22 by selling 21,000 copies (a 38% rise), spurred by sales due to the Oscar win at the 81st Academy Awards. As of April 2009, the soundtrack has sold 236,000 copies in United States.

== Track listing ==
Worldwide Track list

No.	Title	Lyrics	Performer(s)	Length
1.	"O... Saya^{*}"	A. R. Rahman, M.I.A.	A. R. Rahman and M.I.A.	3:34
2.	"Riots"		Madhumitha	1:59
3.	"Mausam & Escape"		Asad Khan (sitar)	3:53
4.	"Paper Planes^{#1}"		M.I.A.	3:23
5.	"Paper Planes (DFA Remix)"		M.I.A.	5:49
6.	"Ringa Ringa"	Raqeeb Alam	Alka Yagnik, Ila Arun	4:15
7.	"Liquid Dance^{#2}"		Palakkad Sreeram, Srimathumitha	2:59
8.	"Latika's Theme"		Suzanne D'Mello	3:09
9.	"Aaj Ki Raat^{#3}"	Javed Akhtar	Sonu Nigam, Mahalakshmi Iyer, Alisha Chinai	6:07
10.	"Millionaire"		A.R. Rahman, Madhumitha	2:44
11.	"Gangsta Blues"	BlaaZe	BlaaZe, Tanvi Shah	3:42
12.	"Dreams on Fire"	BlaaZe, Wendy Parr	Suzanne D'Mello	4:08
13.	"Jai Ho^{**}"	Gulzar, Tanvi Shah	Sukhwinder Singh, Tanvi Shah, Mahalakshmi Iyer, Vijay Prakash	5:19

℗ & © Universal Music Group, Interscope Records, N.E.E.T

Indian Track List

No.	Title	Lyrics	Performer(s)	Length
1.	"Ringa Ringa"	Raqeeb Alam	Alka Yagnik, Ila Arun	4:15
2.	"Jai Ho^{**}"	Gulzar, Tanvi Shah	Sukhwinder Singh, Tanvi Shah, Mahalakshmi Iyer, Vijay Prakash	5:19
3.	"O... Saya^{*}"	A. R. Rahman, M.I.A.	A. R. Rahman and M.I.A.	3:34
4.	"Latika's Theme"		Suzanne D'Mello	3:09
5.	"Mausam & Escape"		Asad Khan (sitar)	3:53
6.	"Liquid Dance^{#2}"		Palakkad Sreeram, Srimathumitha	2:59
7.	"Riots"		Madhumitha	1:59
8.	"Millionaire"		A.R. Rahman, Madhumitha	2:44
9.	"Gangsta Blues"	BlaaZe	BlaaZe, Tanvi Shah	3:42
10.	"Dreams on Fire"	BlaaZe, Wendy Parr	Suzanne D'Mello	4:08

- "Paper Planes", "Paper Planes (DFA Remix)" Were removed due to presence in her debut album Kala & Due to rights By Interscope Records which is under Universal Music Group
- "Aaj Ki Raat" is removed because, it is already from the soundtrack Don: The Chase Begins Again, Which is already under T-Series

℗ & © Super Cassettes Industries Private Limited, T-Series

^{*}Nominated for Best Original Song at Academy Awards
^{**}Winner of Best Original Song at Academy Awards

^{#1}written by M.I.A, Topper Headon, Mick Jones, Wesley Pentz, Paul Simonon, Joe Strummer
^{#2}previously used as a background track in Azhagiya Thamizh Magan (2007, Tamil film) with different instrumentation and no vocals
^{#3}composed by Shankar–Ehsaan–Loy, lyrics by Javed Akhtar; from the soundtrack Don: The Chase Begins Again

Not in the soundtrack

Other music featured in the film include:

1. Salim's mobile phone ringtone – adapted from theme music to Swades.
2. Opera performance at the Taj Mahal – "Che farò senza Euridice?" from Gluck's Orfeo ed Euridice.
3. "Who Wants To Be A Millionaire" Soundtrack – Keith Strachan & Matthew Strachan.
4. "Great DJ" by The Ting Tings featured in the trailer.

== Charts ==
=== Weekly charts ===
Chart (2008–09)	Peak position
Australian Albums (ARIA)	36
Austrian Albums (Ö3 Austria)	23
Belgian Albums (Ultratop Flanders)	26
Belgian Albums (Ultratop Wallonia)	59
Dutch Albums (Album Top 100)	52
French Albums (SNEP)	24
German Albums (Offizielle Top 100)	54
Hungarian Albums (MAHASZ)	25
Icelandic Albums (Tónlistinn)	10
Mexican Albums (AMPROFON)	3
New Zealand Albums (RMNZ)	19
Norwegian Albums (VG-lista)	36
Polish Albums (ZPAV)	8
Portuguese Albums (AFP)	26
Scottish Albums (Official Charts)	31
Spanish Albums (Promusicae)	17
Swiss Albums (Schweizer Hitparade)	24
UK Albums (Official Charts)	13
US Billboard 200	4
US Top Dance Albums (Billboard)	1
US Soundtrack Albums (Billboard)	1

=== Year-end charts ===
Chart (2009)	Position
UK Albums (OCC)	121
US Billboard 200	93
US Top Dance/Electronic Albums (Billboard)	2
US Soundtrack Albums (Billboard)	8

== Certifications ==
Region	Certification	Certified units/sales
Australia (ARIA)	Gold	35,000^{^}
Ireland (IRMA)	Gold	7,500^{^}
United Kingdom (BPI)	Gold	100,000^{^}
United States	—	406,000
Summaries
Worldwide	—	2,000,000
^{^} Shipments figures based on certification alone.
