= Aaj Ki Raat =

Single by Alisha, Mahalaxmi Iyer and Sonu Nigam

from the album Don
- Language: Hindi
- Released: 27 September 2006
- Studio: Purple Haze Studios; Panchathan Record Inn; AM Studios
- Length: 6:11
- Label: T-Series
- Composer: Shankar–Ehsaan–Loy
- Lyricist: Javed Akhtar
- Producers: Farhan Akhtar; Ritesh Sidhwani

Audio sample
- file; help

Aaj Ki Raat (transl. Tonight!) is a 2006 Hindi song from the Bollywood film soundtrack for Don: The Chase Begins Again. The track is composed by Shankar–Ehsaan–Loy trio with lyrics penned by Javed Akhtar.

== Development ==
The track falls into the genre of 1980s retro-disco. Director Farhan Akhtar suggested using a retro rock number. Shankar–Ehsaan–Loy got together with director Farhan Akhtar, who himself was a music enthusiast, to come up with the track which had elements of music styles they listened to in the late 1970s and 1980s. The song fits well in the film, as the film in itself is a retro story presented in a modern style. To ensure that this song fits in line with the 1970s, the track was heavily inspired from 1977 Donna Summer hit I Feel Love.

Ehsaan stated that the song was influenced by the synthpop music of the late 1970s and 1980s, including musicians such as Ultravox and Cerrone.

The song was performed by Alisha, Mahalaxmi Iyer and Sonu Nigam.

== Reception ==
The song was well received by the critics. It was featured in the 10 Dances that Made You Flock the Theatres list of Bollywood Hungama. It also did well in the music charts and climbed up later on. The Don soundtrack album became the best-selling Bollywood soundtrack albums of 2006, with 1.5 million units sold in India.

== Music video ==
The song is illustrated with Shah Rukh Khan, Priyanka Chopra and Isha Koppikar. The song features three of the stars dancing to the tunes of Aaj Ki Raat in an underground night club where the plot takes an interesting twist. Choreography of the song is done by Saroj Khan.

== Slumdog Millionaire ==
A version of the song was included in the Academy Award-winning soundtrack Slumdog Millionaire (2008) by A. R. Rahman. The song features in the climax of the film, when the gangsters and mafia boss Javed dance to the tune while "Aaj Ki Raat" plays on the TV, though it shows the music video of Rahman's "Fanaa" from Yuva (2004) being played. The Slumdog Millionaire soundtrack album sold over 2 million units worldwide.
