= Instant Karma (band) =

Indian musical group

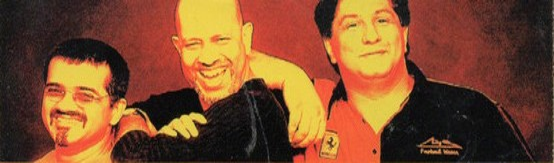
- Instant Karma Farhad-Ehsaan-Loy

Background information
- Origin: Mumbai, India
- Genres: Versions
- Years active: 1996–2006
- Label: Sony Music India
- Members: Ehsaan Noorani; Loy Mendonsa; Farhad Wadia

Instant Karma is an Indian band formed by Ehsaan Noorani, Loy Mendonsa and Farhad Wadia most popular for its albums Dance Masti and its sequels. According to them, they do "versions, not covers."

== History ==
Instant Karma was formed after Bally Sagoo came out with his album of versions Bollywood Flashback in mid 1990s. Ehsaan and Loy thought of starting a band to do something comparable, if not better. They just did a couple of songs one of them being Dil Kya Kare and forgot about them. Then Sony Music marketed Dil Kya Kare and it was a huge hit. After that Ehsaan, Loy and Farhad started with Instant Karma and compiling albums regularly.

Instant Karma employed many talented voices such as Shankar Mahadevan, Shaan, Sagarika, Zubeen Garg, Mahalakshmi Iyer etc.

The first two albums in the Dance Masti collection have sold about 700,000 copies.

== Discography ==
Year	Albums	Sony Music India
1996	Dance Masti	Sony Music India
1999	Return of Dance Masti	Sony Music India
2002	Dance Masti... Again	Sony Music India
2006	Dance Masti Forever (9 New tracks + 6 bonus tracks from 3 album released in past)	Sony Music India

Year	Compilation	Details	Sony Music India
2006	Dance Masti & 60 Other Hits	A Compilation with Instant karma's tracks & other soundtrack, Pop single & Pop album tracks	Sony Music India
2006	Best of Dance Masti	3 CD Compilation	Sony Music India
2011	Dance Masti: A Sound Affair	3 CD Instrumental Compilation	Sony Music India
2011	Dance Masti Gold	3 CD Main tracks from past & 2 CD Instrumental Compilation	Sony Music India

As Composer

Year	Albums	artist	Sony Music India
2002	Mahalakshmi	Mahalakshmi Iyer	Sony Music India
2002	Vaazhkkai (Tamil Version Of Mahalakshmi)	Mahalakshmi Iyer	Sony Music India
