= Jai Ho (song) =

2008 song by A. R. Rahman

Song by A. R. Rahman featuring Sukhwinder Singh, Tanvi Shah, Mahalaxmi Iyer and Vijay Prakash

from the album: Slumdog Millionaire: Music from the Motion Picture
- Released: 25 November 2008
- Recorded: 13 November 2008
- Studio: Panchathan Record Inn and AM Studios (Chennai, India)
- Genre: Soundtrack Single
- Length: 5:19
- Label: Celador; N.E.E.T.; Interscope
- Songwriters: A. R. Rahman (music); Gulzar (lyrics); Tanvi Shah (lyrics)
- Producer: A. R. Rahman

"Jai Ho" is a song composed by A.R. Rahman for the 2008 film Slumdog Millionaire, featuring Dev Patel and Freida Pinto. When Danny Boyle, the director of Slumdog Millionaire, approached Rahman to compose its soundtrack, he included the song. "Jai Ho" accompanies a choreographed dance sequence at the end credits of the film (choreographed by Longinus Fernandes). Indian singer Tanvi Shah wrote and provided vocals for an English section of the song. "Jai Ho" is a Hindi phrase which means "Victory ensues."

"Jai Ho" was, at the time of its release, "the toast of the town in almost every part of the world". Covers and remixes of the song and performances of the "Jai Ho" dance were posted on YouTube. "Jai Ho" received widespread acclaim from music critics, who cited it as the best song on the Slumdog Millionaire soundtrack. The song won an Academy Award for Best Original Song and a Grammy Award for Best Song Written for a Motion Picture, Television or Other Visual Media. It was also the official campaign song of the Indian National Congress during the 2009 election. It was the first Indian song to win the Academy Award for Best Original Song, followed by "Naatu Naatu" from RRR (2022).

American girl group the Pussycat Dolls recorded an English interpretation of "Jai Ho". Entitled "Jai Ho! (You Are My Destiny)", and credited to 'A. R. Rahman and the Pussycat Dolls featuring Nicole Scherzinger', the song appeared on the re-release of the group's second studio album Doll Domination (2008).

== Background ==
In 2008, while working on several films, A. R. Rahman received an email from Danny Boyle, the director of the film Slumdog Millionaire, stating: "Hey I'm Danny Boyle, I like your work, and it would be great for us to have you on our film". Rahman was unsure how to answer, but after exchanging several more emails, they met in Mumbai. Rahman summarized their first meeting by saying "when I talked to him, I had some interest and I wanted to see the film. He had a first cut of the film already, and when I saw that I was really interested and wanted to do it. So I left another film to do this one. I made time for it".

While composing the soundtrack to the Slumdog Millionaire, Rahman aimed to mix modern India with eighties soundtracks. Boyle, who "hated sentiment and cello", told Rahman to "never put a cello in my film". Boyle also insisted on a "pulsey" score. Rahman stated that Boyle wanted "edgy, upfront" music that did not suppress sound. He noted that "There's not many cues in the film. Usually a big film has 130 cues. This had just seventeen or eighteen: the end credits, beginning credits".

The soundtrack for Slumdog Millionaire took Rahman two months to plan and two weeks to complete. He recalled that: "Usually it takes six months with the musical films I'm doing in India". Rahman said the soundtrack "isn't about India or Indian culture. The story could happen anywhere: China, Brazil, anywhere. Who Wants to Be a Millionaire is on in every damn country".

== Writing and composition ==
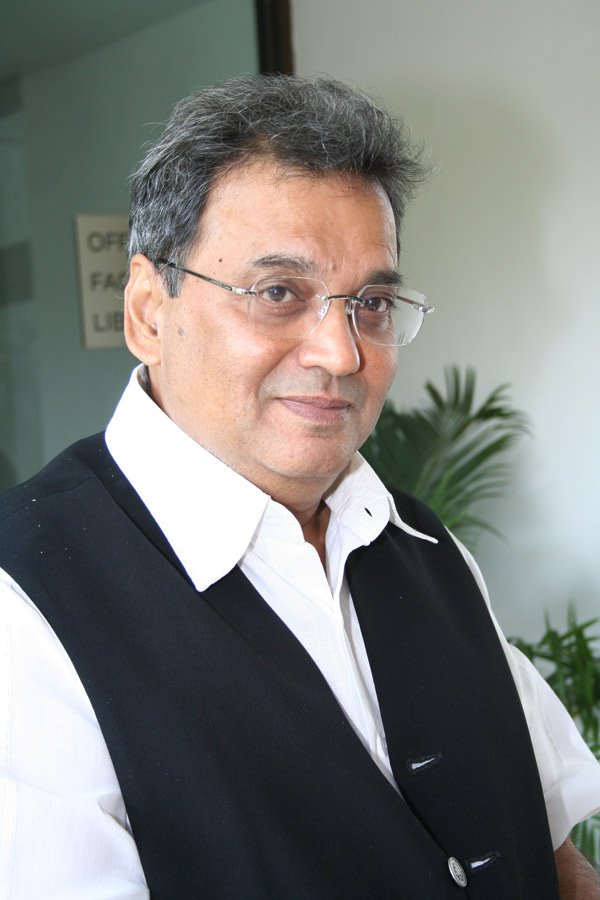
"Jai Ho" was originally composed for Subhash Ghai's 2008 film Yuvvraaj, but the director felt the song to be "too subtle and soft" for inclusion in the film.

Rahman composed "Jai Ho" in Logic Pro, a digital audio workstation and MIDI sequencer, using samplers to create the "trancey, arpeggiated" musical line.

The lyrics to "Jai Ho" were written by Gulzar and are a combination of Hindi, Urdu and Punjabi. Lyrics in Spanish are also included in the song "to go along with his [Rahman] Latin American touch of music". According to the India-EU Film Initiative, this inclusion "really makes the song quite unique and international". Of the three singers credited, Sukhwinder Singh is the principal vocalist. Vijay Prakash sang the portion with the words "Jai Ho", which takes a high pitch at numerous junctures of the song. Mahalakshmi Iyer sang the Hindi words between the "Jai Ho" chants and the portions of the verses not sung by Singh. Tanvi Shah sang and wrote the song's Spanish words.

According to Rahman, "Jai Ho" was meant to create "a vision of the whole world celebrating this victory". The song contains a mix of "multiple motifs from the traditional pieces on the soundtrack" with "the big drums and blasting horns of the present". It was originally composed and shortlisted for Subhash Ghai's 2008 film Yuvvraaj. Although Rahman was excited about the song, Ghai "wasn't too kicked about it". Ghai felt it was "too subtle and soft to be picturized on the character played by Zayed Khan". Rahman and Gulzar believed the song had "immense potential" and used it in Slumdog Millionaire. Following the song's win at the Oscars, Rahman stated that: "He [Ghai] said the words had a positive feel. It was like a prayer. I honestly didn't think the song would win me an Oscar though. But like the film Slumdog suggests, everything has its own destiny".

When asked if he considers "Jai Ho" as his best creation, Rahman stated: "Sometimes it's not about a best creation, but the best for a particular moment of the film. 'Jai Ho' was right for that particular moment, that particular mindset in Slumdog Millionaire. I know there's lot of debate over this song winning the Oscars. But then, I didn't send the song to the Oscars, the makers did. I just composed the tune in three weeks and was done with it. However, I too feel 'Jai Ho' was apt for that particular moment in the film—the protagonist comes out of darkness and pain to light amid 'Jai Ho' hammering in the background."

== Critical response ==
"Jai Ho" (2008)
A thirty second sample of "Jai Ho".

"Jai Ho" received critical acclaim. Bhasker Gupta of AllMusic labelled the song a highlight of the soundtrack. Tajpal Rathore of BBC Music gave the song a positive review, calling it a "quintessential Rahman track". He praised Sukhwinder Singh, saying that he "does an amazing job". Sean Daly of the St. Petersburg Times called the song and its choreography "brilliant". He described it as "two lovers consummating their long, winding courtship not with sex but a hand-waving, side-stepping, totally cathartic shimmy". In a review of the Slumdog Millionaire soundtrack, Joginder Tutej of Bollywood Hungama deemed "Jai Ho" the "flagship number" of the film. Tutej complimented Sukhwinder Singh's vocals as being "energetic" and concluded that the singer "can comfortably add on another big chartbuster to his name". He also stated that the song, while "boasting of an amazing mix of melody and rhythm" remains "Indian at heart" and is "instantly catchy". He concluded that: "No wonder, it is the lone promotional song of the film and also sees a music video being dedicated to it. Gulzar saab celebrates the spirit of love and life with 'Jai Ho' and infuses enough power in it that justifies all the nominations it is receiving today".

== Recognition ==
According to the India-EU Film Initiative "Jai Ho" became "the toast of the town in almost every part of the world". They noted that: "Music experts are listening to the song again and again to appreciate the global texture of the song and at the same time they are admiring the beauty of the lyrics by India's foremost lyricist Gulzar who, like AR Rahman, has always experimented with his narrative". According to Sean Daly of the St. Petersburg Times: "YouTube now has vids of babies and girlfriends doing this Jai Ho dance. There are remixes and tributes, too".

"Jai Ho" received an Academy Award for Best Original Song at the 81st Academy Awards on 22 February 2009. The song beat out WALL-E's "Down to Earth" by Peter Gabriel and "O... Saya", also of Slumdog Millionaire, by A. R. Rahman and M.I.A. "Jai Ho" also received a Grammy Award for Best Song Written for a Motion Picture during the 52nd Grammy Awards on 31 January 2010. The song received a nomination from the Broadcast Film Critics Association for Best Song during its 2008 award ceremony on 8 January 2009. The Houston Film Critics Society nominated it for Best Original Song during its 2008 awards ceremony on 17 December 2008. It was also nominated by the MTV Movie Awards for Best Song From a Movie during its 2009 award ceremony on 31 May 2009.

In February 2026, the Brihanmumbai Municipal Corporation installed India's first "musical road" along a stretch of the Mumbai Coast. The road uses a series of rumble strips to play 'Jai Ho' when cars drive over it.

== Live performances ==
Rahman performed "Jai Ho" live during the 81st Academy Awards on 22 February 2009, the night it won the award for Best Original Song. The song served as the opening of the ceremony. Rahman modified the song to "set it in sync with the live orchestra and make it suitable for a stage presentation". Singh was supposed to be part of the performance but encountered delays obtaining a work visa. Gulzar chose not to attend, joking he "didn't have a proper suit."

"Jai Ho" was performed as part of a medley with "Jiyo Utho Badho Jeeto" during the 2010 Delhi Commonwealth Games opening ceremony on 28 August 2010. Rahman, who wore a white bandhgala jacket, black pants and white shoes, was accompanied by hundreds of dancers wearing traditional Indian costumes. Following the performance of "Jiyo Utho Badho Jeeto", fireworks went off and "Jai Ho" began. An editor from Sify wrote that, during the performance of "Jai Ho", "the chant at Jawaharlal Nehru Stadium, many would swear, was magical".

== Usage in media ==
In March 2009, Super Cassettes Industries (T-Series), the music company which holds the song's copyright for India, received nearly $200,000 from the governing Indian National Congress party for its use in its national campaign in 2009 Indian General Elections. Harindra Singh, vice-chairman and managing director of the advertising firm Percept, told BBC that: "The tune of the song and the Jai Ho phrase have been used in the campaign. The lyrics have been written by a combination of people, they will be projecting what the Congress wishes to communicate". "Popular Bollywood numbers" are often "re-jigged" by political parties in India to "convey their message to voters", but this is the first time that a party has ever bought exclusive rights to use a song for political promotion. The version used in the campaign features altered lyrics sung by Sukhwinder Singh, who performed on the original song. A video was also shot for this version. Rahman refused to comment on "Jai Ho" being used for the campaigns, but stated that the song "belongs to everyone". "Jai Ho" was performed by Ravi K Tripathi, a Lucknow-based singer, at the closing ceremony of 16th Asian Games on 27 November 2010.

== English adaptation ==
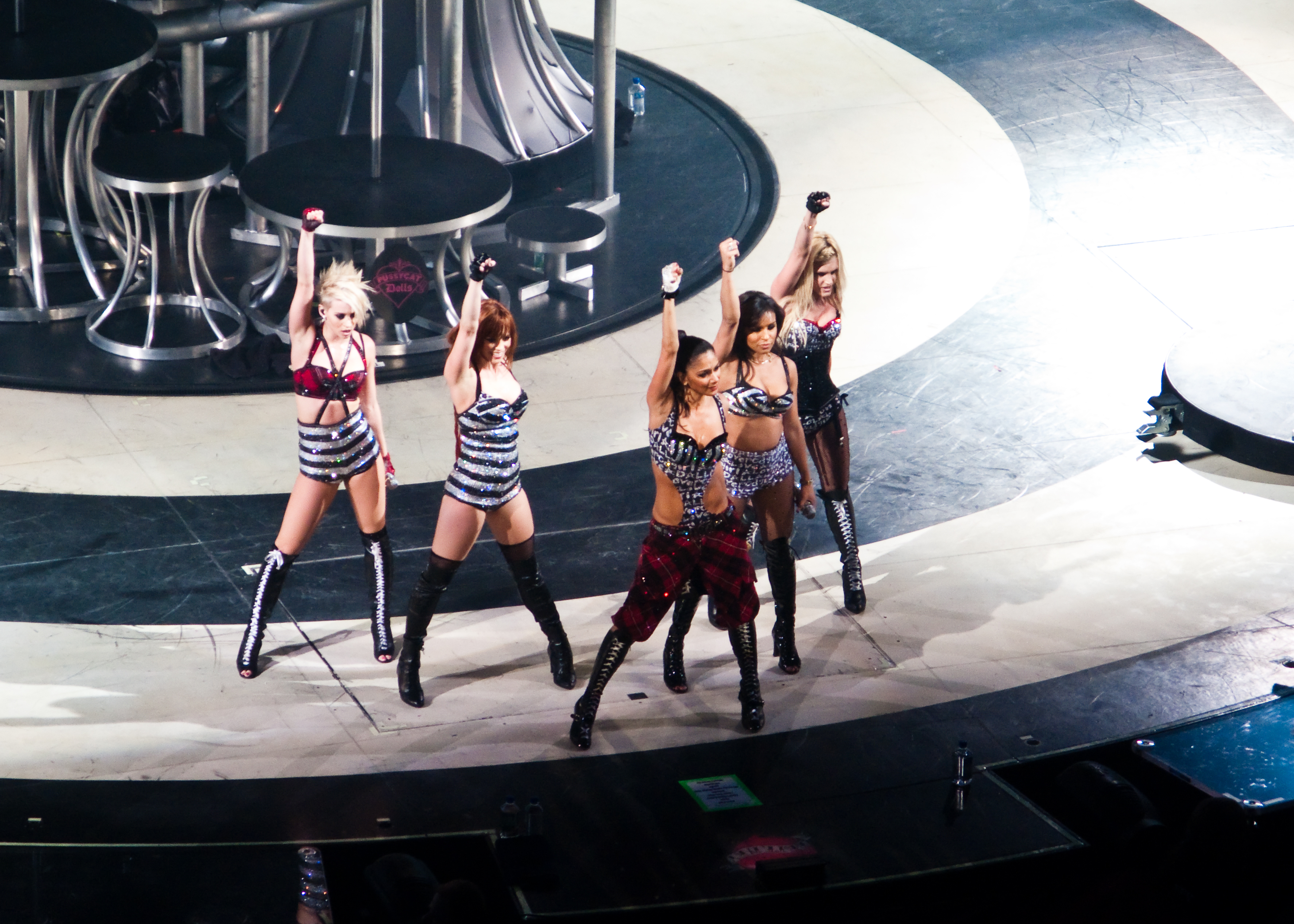
The Pussycat Dolls performing "Jai Ho! (You Are My Destiny)" as the opening act of Britney Spears' 2009 tour, The Circus Starring Britney Spears

American girl group The Pussycat Dolls recorded an English interpretation of "Jai Ho". Entitled "Jai Ho! (You Are My Destiny)", and credited to 'A. R. Rahman and the Pussycat Dolls featuring Nicole Scherzinger', the song appeared on the re-release of the group's second studio album Doll Domination (2008). After watching Slumdog Millionaire, record executives Ron Fair and Jimmy Iovine wanted to turn "Jai Ho" into a "pop record without deviating from the original melody".

After getting a green-light from Rahman, they asked Scherzinger, the lead singer of the Pussycat Dolls, to write an interpretation of the song. Scherzinger was hesitant at first, stating in an interview that: "[...] I was scared to death to touch it [and] afraid for people to hear it before I even wrote it". Scherzinger put her "heart into writing the lyrics and put in themes from the film Slumdog Millionaire. Love and destiny were elements from the movie that she put into the track". She stated that she "prayed every night to do this right". Fair and Iovine additionally hired Brick & Lace, the Writing Camp and Ester Dean to write their own interpretation of the song.

E. Kidd Bogart, a member of the Writing Camp, stated that: "They [Fair and Iovine] wanted to get a bunch of different versions to see who could nail a version for the Pussycat Dolls". Once all interpretations were complete, "they [Fair and Iovine] took parts of the Writing Camp version, parts of Ester Dean's version, and parts of another version, and they put them together, and then Nicole [Scherzinger] and Ron [Fair] filled in the blanks that they thought were missing". Bogart additionally stated that it was "a very unique and awkward way of writing a song". Bogart, Dean, Fair, Erika Nuri, David Quiñones, Scherzinger, Candace Thorbourne, Nailah Thorbourne and Nyanda Thorbourne are credited for writing the track, while its production was handled by Fair and Scherzinger. The song was recorded in London, while Scherzinger and Rahman corresponded via webcam.

Music critics responded generally favorably to "Jai Ho (You Are My Destiny)". Newsround praised the song by saying "[Nicole Scherzinger] sounds right at home – making the most of her soulful R&B voice and hitting all the (incredibly) high notes on this Eastern-themed piece of pop!" Nick Levine from Digital Spy wrote that, "The Hindi original, which soundtracks the Bollywood dance routine at the end of the movie, is far more urgent and atmospheric, but this remake works nicely enough as a slick, shamelessly opportunistic PCD single. Well, that hollered "JAI HO!" makes for a pretty sweet pop hook, you have to admit".

== See also ==
- List of Indian winners and nominees of the Golden Globe Awards
