= Ehsaan Noorani =

Indian composer and guitarist (born 1963)

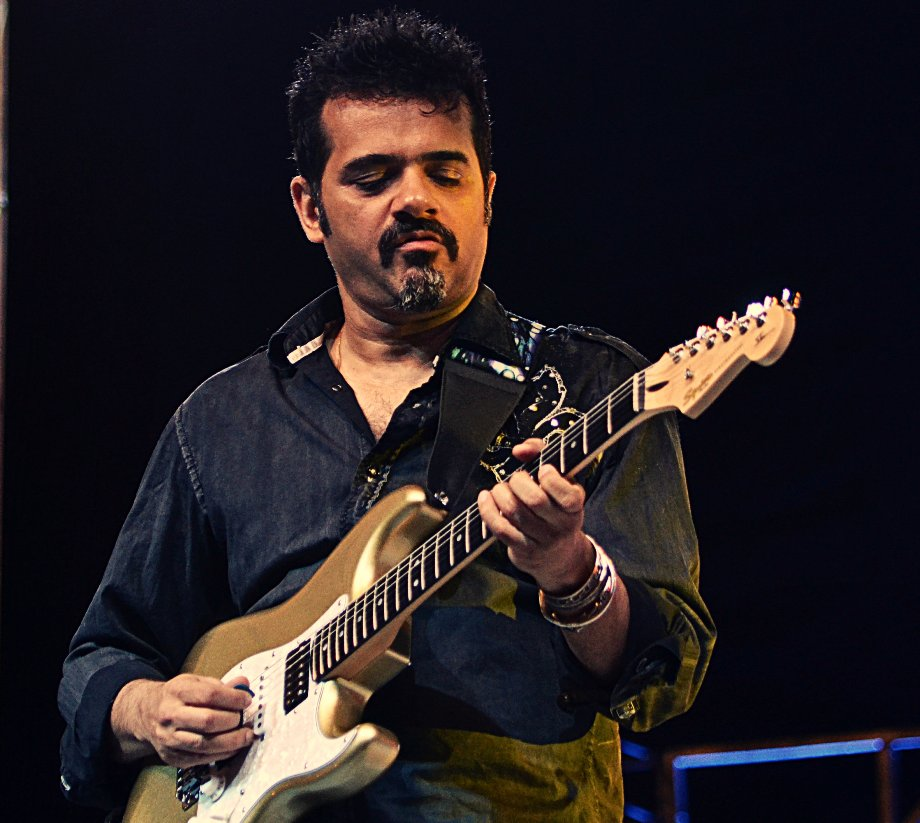
- Noorani performing in 2013

Background information
- Born: 12 October 1963 (age 61); Mumbai, Maharashtra, India
- Genres: Blues, Bollywood
- Occupation(s): Music composer, musician
- Instrument: Guitar
- Years active: 1986–present
- Member of: Shankar–Ehsaan–Loy
- Website: ehsaannoorani.com

Ehsaan Noorani is an Indian composer and guitarist.

== Music career ==
Noorani is the part of the Shankar–Ehsaan–Loy trio, which consists of Shankar Mahadevan, Loy Mendonsa and himself. He started off as a freelance guitarist for many composers including Louis Banks, Ashok Patki, Ronnie Desai and Gary Lawyer to name a few . Ehsaan studied music with Mr. Bismarck Rodrigues, an experienced guitar teacher from Mumbai.

Noorani studied music at the Musicians Institute in Hollywood, California from 1985 to 1986 . Ehsaan is the first guitarist from India to be endorsed by Fender guitars and has a Squier signature model to his name. He also endorses Fractal Audio and D'Addario strings . His playing is strongly influenced by players like Robben Ford, B. B. King, Larry Carlton, etc.

In 2015, Noorani was a co-judge in India's first Western reality show, The Stage, produced by Viacom. It aired on Colours Infinity.

During the COVID-19 pandemic, Noorani was credited for promoting large number of Indian artists through his Instagram live sessions and thereby providing a platform for budding musicians in India to collaborate and make music.

== Instruments and effects ==
Noorani is most notably associated with using the Squier Stratocaster guitar and is endorsed by the Fender family of brands. In 2011 Squier released the Ehsaan Noorani Signature Stratocaster which included several custom features such as a HSH pickup configuration and exclusive colors. Ehsaan is also endorsed by Neunaber Audio and currently uses an Immerse Reverberator pedal. In March 2015 Vertex effects shared photos of a custom pedal board they assembled for Ehsaan which featured several guitar effects such as a Strymon Flint, a Maxon OD-9 Overdrive, and a WEEHBO Dumbledore.

== Awards and nominations ==
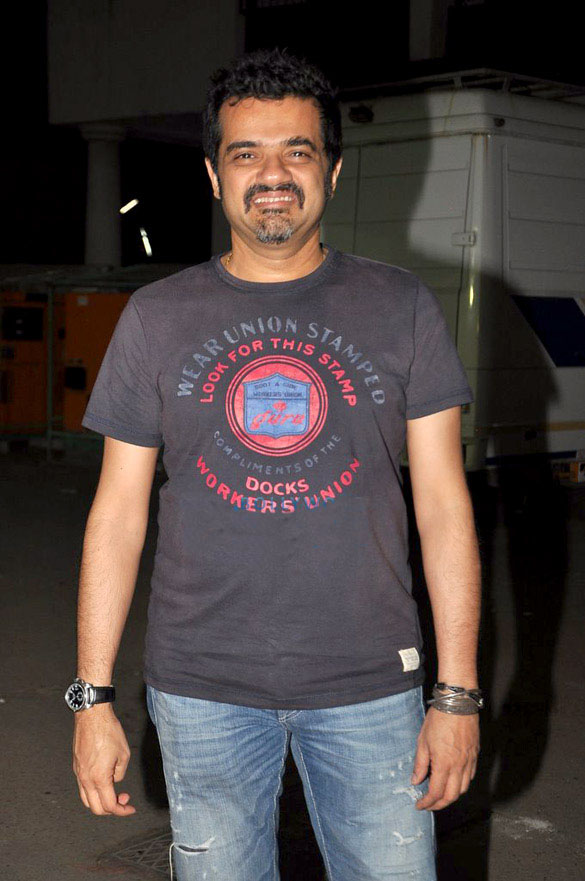
Noorani in 2012

These awards are all with the trio Shankar–Ehsaan–Loy

=== National Film Awards, India ===
- 2004: Best Music Direction win for Kal Ho Naa Ho

=== IIFA Awards ===
- 2004: Best Music Direction win for Kal Ho Naa Ho
- 2006: Best Music Direction win for Bunty aur Babli
- 2014: IIFA Award for Best Background Score "win" for Bhaag Milkha Bhaag

"2015: IIFA Best Music Director Award for 2 States

=== Filmfare Awards ===
- 2001: Best Music Direction nomination for Dil Chahta Hai
- 2001: RD Burman Award for New Music Talent win for Dil Chahta Hai
- 2003: Best Music Direction win for Kal Ho Naa Ho
- 2005: Best Music Direction win for Bunty Aur Babli
- 2015: Best Music Direction win for 2 States

=== Star Screen Awards ===
- 2000: Best Background Music nomination for Mission Kashmir
- 2001: Best Music Direction win for Dil Chahta Hai
- 2005: Best Music Direction win for Bunty aur Babli

=== Zee Cine Awards ===
- 2006: Best Music Director win for Bunty aur Babli
