= Shankar Mahadevan =

Indian singer (born 1967)

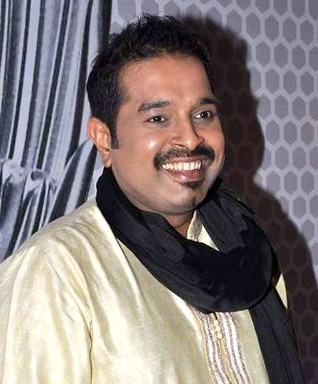
- Mahadevan in 2009
- Born: 3 March 1967 (age 59); Mumbai, Maharashtra, India
- Children: 2, Siddharth, Shivam
- Musical career
- Genre: Indian music
- Occupations: Singer; composer
- Instrument: Vocals
- Years active: 1994–present
- Member of: Shankar–Ehsaan–Loy
- Website: shankarmahadevan.com

Shankar Mahadevan (born 3 March 1967) is an Indian singer and composer who is part of the Shankar–Ehsaan–Loy trio that makes music for Indian films. In 2023, he was awarded an honorary doctorate (honoris causa degree) by Birmingham City University.

== Early and personal life ==
Shankar Mahadevan was born in Chembur, Mumbai into a Tamil family originally from Palakkad, Kerala. He learned Hindustani classical and Carnatic music as a child and began playing the veena at the age of five under Shri Lalitha Venkataraman. Mahadevan studied music under Pandit Shrinivas Khale and T.R. Balamani.

He is an alumnus of Our Lady of Perpetual Succour High School, Chembur and graduated in 1988 with a degree in Computer Science and Software Engineering from the Ramrao Adik Institute of Technology in Navi Mumbai, affiliated with Mumbai University, and was a software engineer for the company Leading Edge. After working for Leading Edge Systems (now Trigyn Technologies Limited), Mahadevan ventured into music.

He has two sons, Siddharth Mahadevan and Shivam Mahadevan, both of whom are singers.

== Musical career ==
Mahadevan got early fame as an Indi-pop star with his fusion of Carnatic, Hindustani, and jazz. He earned his first award as a playback singer in a Tamil movie, collaborating with A. R. Rahman and winning a National Film Award for his song in Kandukondain Kandukondain. At that time, his debut non-film album, Breathless released and topped the Indian music charts in 1998. He won one Grammy Award and received three nominations. Mahadevan has composed songs in the Hindi film music industry as part of the trio Shankar–Ehsaan–Loy, since 1999. In 2019, he was felicitated with the Padma Shri Award for his contribution to film music.

He has remained active in music. In 2024, he also contributed vocals to the stage production Humare Ram. The production was produced by Rahul Bhuchar.

== Awards and honors ==
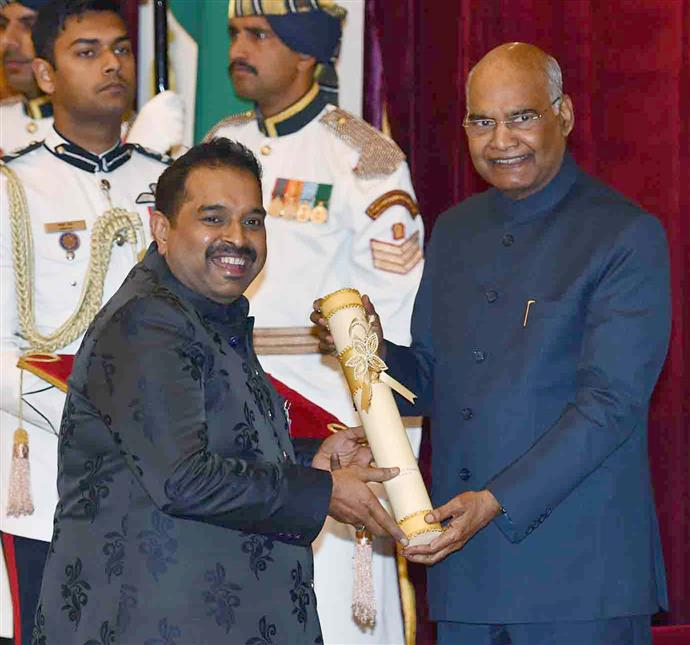
The President, Shri Ram Nath Kovind presenting the Padma Shree Award to Mahadevan, at an Investiture Ceremony, at Rashtrapati Bhavan, in New Delhi on 11 March 2019

- 2000: National Film Award for Best Male Playback Singer – "Yenna Solla Pogirai" (Kandukondain Kandukondain)
- 2006: Filmfare Award for Best Male Playback Singer – Telugu – "Chandrullo" (Nuvvostanante Nenoddantana)
- 2007: Swaralaya-Kairali-Yesudas Award for outstanding contribution to Indian film music
- 2007: National Film Award for Best Male Playback Singer – "Maa" (Taare Zameen Par)
- 2008: Kerala State Film Award for Best Male Playback Singer – "Kalyana Kacheri" (Madampi)
- 2009: Asianet Film Award for Best Male Playback – "Pichavecha Naal" (Puthiya Mukham)
- 2009: Annual Malayalam Movie Awards (Dubai) for Best Male Singer – "Pichavecha Naal" (Puthiya Mukham)
- 2011: Lata Mangeshkar Award by Government of Andhra Pradesh
- 2011: Kerala Film Critics Award for Best Male Playback Singer – "Indhumukhi Varumo" (Holidays)
- 2012: MAA Music Award for Best Male Playback Singer – "Nee Dookudu" (Dookudu)
- 2012: National Film Award for Best Male Playback Singer – "Bolo Na" (Chittagong)
- 2015: Tulu Cinemotsava Awards for Best Playback Singer – Rikshaw Driver (Tulu Movie)
- 2019: Padma Shri Award for his contributions to film music under the category Arts.
- 2023: Awarded an honorary doctorate (honoris causa degree) by Birmingham City University.
- 2024: Grammy Award for Best Global Music Album for This Moment as a member of Shakti.
- 2026: Grammy Awards nominations for the album Mind Explosion (50th Anniversary Tour Live) in the Best Global Music Album category and Shrini's Dream (Live) in the Best Global Music Performance category.

== Filmography ==
=== As actor ===
- Aranmanai 3 (2021) Tamil – guest appearance in song "Theeyaga Thondarihvn
- Katyar Kaljat Ghusali (2015)
- Rhythm (2000) Tamil – guest appearance in song "Thaniye"
- Ek Se Badkar Ek (1995)

=== Television ===
- Sa Re Ga Ma Pa Li'l Champs (2022) as a judge
- Sa Re Ga Ma Pa: Sapnon Ki Shuruwaat as a judge
- Taare Zameen Par as a judge
- Rising Star Live on Colors as a judge
- Indian Voice on Mazhavil Manorama as a judge
- Super Singer 6 & Super Singer 7 as a special guest on Star Vijay
- Vijay Star Nite as a performer on Star Vijay
- Super Singer Junior seasons 6 & 7 on Star Vijay as a judge
- Super Singer Champion of Champions on Star Vijay as a judge
- Super Singer 8 as a performer & judge on the Grand Launch Episode on Star Vijay
- Sa Re Ga Ma Pa Hindi (2012) as a judge and mentor
- Music ka Maha Muqqabla as a contestant-captain of Shankar's Rockstars
- Sa Re Ga Ma Pa Challenge (2009), as a judge and mentor

== Discography ==
=== As composer ===
- Rockford (1999)
- Bhopal Express (1999)
- Shool (1999)
- Dillagi (1999)
- Mission Kashmir (2000)
- Aalavandhan (2001) (Tamil)
- Dil Chahta Hai (2001)
- Yeh Kya Ho Raha Hai? (2002)
- Ek Aur Ek Gyarah (2003)
- Armaan (2003)
- Nayee Padosan (2003)
- Kuch Naa Kaho (2003)
- Kal Ho Naa Ho (2003)
- Rudraksh (2004)
- Main Hoon Na (2004)
- Kyun! Ho Gaya Na... (2004)
- Lakshya (2004)
- Phir Milenge (2004)
- Vanity Fair (2004)
- Bunty Aur Babli (2005)
- Dil Jo Bhi Kahey... (2005)
- Dus (2005)
- Kabhi Alvida Naa Kehna (2006)
- Don: The Chase Begins Again (2006)
- Salaam-e-Ishq: A Tribute to Love (2007)
- Marigold: An Adventure in India (2007)
- Heyy Babyy (2007)
- Jhoom Barabar Jhoom (2007)
- Johnny Gaddaar (2007)
- Taare Zameen Par (2007)
- High School Musical 2 soundtrack (Hindi version)
- Rock On!! (2008)
- Thoda Pyaar Thoda Magic (2008)
- Madambi (Malayalam) (2008)
- Chandni Chowk to China (2009)
- 13B: Fear Has a New Address / Yavarum Nalam (Hindi-Tamil) (2009)
- Shortkut (2009)
- Luck by Chance (2009)
- Sikandar (2009)
- Konchem Ishtam Konchem Kashtam (Telugu) (2009)
- Wake Up Sid (2009)
- London Dreams (2009)
- My Name Is Khan (2010)
- Kismat Talkies (2010)
- Karthik Calling Karthik (2010)
- Hum Tum Aur Ghost (2010)
- Housefull (2010)
- Tere Bin Laden (2010)
- Koochie Koochie Hota Hai (2011)
- Patiala House (2011)
- De Ghuma Ke (World Cup 2011 song)
- Game (2011)
- Zindagi Na Milegi Dobara (2011)
- Don 2 (2011)
- Chittagong (2012)
- Vishwaroopam (2013)
- Bhaag Milkha Bhaag (2013)
- D - Day (2013)
- One By Two (2014)
- Darr @ the Mall (2014)
- 2 States (2014)
- Kill Dil (2014)
- Mitwaa (2015) Marathi
- Katyar Kaljat Ghusali (2015) Marathi
- Than Than Gopal (2015) Marathi
- Thai Manne 2.0 (2023) Tamil
- Thai Manne 2.0 (2023) Hindi

=== Solo albums ===
- Breathless
- Nine

== Shankar Mahadevan Academy ==
The Shankar Mahadevan Academy is a music academy founded by composer and singer Shankar Mahadevan along with Sridhar Ranganathan Founder and CEO of Cloodon- Personalized Learning Platform.
