= 2 States: The Story of My Marriage =

2009 novel by Chetan Bhagat

- Author: Chetan Bhagat
- Language: English
- Genre: Fiction, romance
- Publisher: Rupa Publications Pvt. Ltd
- Publication date: 8 October 2009
- Publication place: India
- Media type: Paperback
- Pages: 321
- ISBN: 978-81-291-1530-0
- Website: www.chetanbhagat.com/books/2-states/

2 States: The Story of My Marriage, commonly known as 2 States, is a 2009 novel written by Chetan Bhagat. It is the story about a couple coming from two states in India, who face hardships in convincing their parents to approve of their marriage. Bhagat wrote this novel after quitting his job as an investment banker. This is his fourth book after Five Point Someone, One Night @ the Call Centre and The Three Mistakes of My Life.

== Plot summary ==
2 States: The Story of My Marriage is autobiographical with only names changed. The story is about a couple Krish and Ananya, who hail from two states of India, Punjab and Tamil Nadu, respectively, who are deeply in love and want to marry. It is narrated from a first-person point of view in a humorous tone, often taking digs at both Tamil and Punjabi cultures.

The story begins in the IIM Ahmedabad mess hall where Krish, a Punjabi boy from Delhi sights a beautiful girl Tamilian girl Ananya, from Chennai quarreling with the mess staff about the food. Ananya was tagged as the "Best girl of the fresher batch". They become friends within a few days. Both graduate and get jobs with serious plans for their wedding. At first, Krish tries to convince his girlfriend Ananya's parents by helping Ananya's brother Manju IIT tuition and by helping her father Swaminathan create his first PowerPoint presentation. He later convinces her mom by helping her fulfill her biggest dream of singing at a concert by arranging for her to perform at the concert organised by Krish's employer City Bank.

With Ananya's parents convinced, the couple then has to convince Krish's mother. But they run into problems as Krish's mother's relatives do not quite like the relationship and do not want Krish to marry a Tamilian. They are won over after Ananya intervenes to help one of Krish's cousins get married. Now as they have convinced both their parents, they decide to make a trip to Mumbai to allow their parents to get to know each other. But this too ends badly as Ananya's parents have a fallout with Krish's mother after which they leave, deciding that the families can never get along. Krish returns home and becomes a depressed workaholic.

Throughout the story, Krish was not on good terms with his father and does not share a close bond with him. But finally, it is revealed that Krish's father travels to Chennai to meet Ananya's parents and successfully convinces them by spending a day with them. Krish & Ananya get married in Chennai in South Indian style with the blessings of their parents. Thus, father and son are reconciled and the novel ends with Ananya giving birth to twin boys. Krish says that the babies belong to a state called 'India', with a thought to end inequality.

== Film adaptation ==
When a film adaptation of the novel was first announced, it was to be directed by Siddharth Anand and the lead roles were to be played by Saif Ali Khan and Priyanka Chopra. The music was to be composed by Vishal–Shekhar. However, the project was called off due to creative differences over the script.

Later, it was announced that the screen adaptation of 2 States would be produced by Sajid Nadiadwala with Shah Rukh Khan and Chopra in the lead roles and Vishal Bhardwaj would be directing the film. However, since Shahrukh Khan did not want to appear in back to back romantic films, Bhardwaj had to look at other options. It was later declared that Imran Khan would be playing the male lead, but due to date clashes, Imran and Chopra had to opt out as well, and Bhardwaj also opted out, instead working with Imran on Matru Ki Bijlee Ka Mandola (2013). After a lot of brainstorming, it was finally confirmed by producers Karan Johar and Nadiadwala that Arjun Kapoor and Alia Bhatt will be seen playing the lead pair, with Johar's former Student of the Year associate director Abhishek Varman set to adapt and direct. Amrita Singh and Ronit Roy were cast as Kapoor's parents and Revathy and Shiv Kumar Subramaniam were cast as Bhatt's parents.

The film was released on 18 April 2014.
