= 3 Idiotas =

2017 Mexican comedy film

- Directed by: Carlos Bolado
- Screenplay by: Antonio Abascal
- Story by: Abhijat Joshi; Rajkumar Hirani
- Based on: 3 Idiots by: Rajkumar Hirani; Five Point Someone; by Chetan Bhagat
- Produced by: Miguel Mier; Bernardo Rugama; Jimena Rodríguez
- Starring: Alfonso Dosal; Christian Vázquez; Germán Valdés III; Martha Higareda
- Cinematography: Javier Morón
- Edited by: Perla Carpio
- Music by: Alvaro Arce Urroz
- Production companies: Greenlight Productions; Neverending Media; BoBo Producciones; Credix; Cutting Edge; EFICINE.
- Distributed by: Lionsgate; Pantelion Films
- Release date: 31 March 2017
- Country: Mexico
- Language: Spanish
- Box office: US$7.9 million

3 Idiotas is a 2017 Mexican coming-of-age comedy-drama film directed by Carlos Bolado and produced by Miguel Mier, Bernardo Rugama and Jimena Rodríguez. The film is a remake of the 2009 Hindi-language Indian film 3 Idiots, which was itself a loose adaptation of the 2004 Chetan Bhagat novel Five Point Someone. The film stars Alfonso Dosal, Christian Vázquez, German Valdez, and Martha Higareda.

== Plot ==
Two nerdy friends and their arch rival from college embark on an adventure determined to find a college roommate who disappeared without a trace on graduation day.

== Cast ==
- Alfonso Dosal as Pancho
- Christian Vázquez as Felipe
- Germán Valdés III as Beto
- Martha Higareda as Mariana
- Vadhir Derbez as Isidoro
- Sebastián Zurita as Emiliano
- Paulina Dávila as Diana
- Enrique Singer as Don Diego
- Rodrigo Murray as Escalona

== Release ==
3 Idiotas was released on March 31, 2017 by Lionsgate and its Pantelion Films banner.

== Box office ==
The film was a box office hit in Mexico, selling more than 3 million tickets and becoming the highest-grossing domestic film during the first half of 2017. It grossed MX$125.6 million (US$6.64 million) in Mexico, making it the second highest-grossing Mexican film of 2017 below Do It Like an Hombre.

Overseas, the film grossed US$1,249,233 in the United States and Canada, and US$43,077 in Bolivia, for a worldwide total of US$7,932,310.
