= One Indian Girl =

2016 novel by Chetan Bhagat

- Book Cover Image
- Author: Chetan Bhagat
- Language: English
- Subject: Feminism
- Genre: Fiction
- Set in: India, South Asia
- Publisher: Rupa & Co.
- Publication date: October 1, 2016
- Publication place: India
- Media type: Paperback
- Pages: 280
- ISBN: 978-8129142146

One Indian Girl is a 2016 novel by Indian author Chetan Bhagat. The story follows Radhika Mehta, a senior employee in the distressed debt group at Goldman Sachs. The novel explores the personal and professional challenges she faces within the financial sector.

== Plot ==
Radhika Mehta is preparing for her wedding to Brijesh Gulati, a software engineer in San Francisco. The narrative interweaves Radhika's present with flashbacks to her upbringing in Delhi as a studious, introverted girl from a middle-class family. She has an older sister, Aditi, and frequently engages in internal dialogue with her "mini-me," a self-critical inner voice.

At a social event, Radhika encounters her ex-boyfriend, Debashish Sen, called Debu throughout, who attempts to reconnect with her. Despite Radhika's refusal, Debu appears at her wedding in Goa, disrupting the traditional puja bhajan ceremony. Later, Radhika confronts him about his behaviour and manners.

The story revisits Radhika's past, beginning with her job training at Goldman Sachs four years earlier and her subsequent live-in relationship with Debu. Her demanding work begins to affect their relationship.

After a difficult year, Radhika attempts to reconcile with Debu, but he expresses reservations. Their ensuing argument leads to a breakup. Radhika resigns from her job and proposes to Debu, only to find him with another woman. Heartbroken, she accepts a transfer to the Goldman Sachs Hong Kong office, leaving New York behind.

Radhika's career progresses in Hong Kong, where she closes a significant investment deal in the Philippines. She later transfers to London. After facing rejection from several suitors who appear intimidated by her career and income, she agrees to an arranged marriage and meets Brijesh.

== Reception ==
Previous stories by Chetan Bhagat have focused on following dreams. This has had some effect on the thoughts and beliefs of a few young people, according to A. R. Rahman., "It's great to see brave young people giving their dreams a chance." However, One Indian Girl has received mixed reviews. The Indian Express described the book as "a likable handbook for feminists." Some sources considered it "an improvement over" Half Girlfriend, a previous work by Bhagat.

== Plagiarism controversy ==
Chetan Bhagat faced plagiarism allegations due to similarities between One Indian Girl and a short story by Anvita Bajpai, "Drawing Parallels". A court order temporarily suspended the book's publication following its release. Chetan Bhagat denied the allegations.

== Film adaptation ==
Sony Pictures International Productions acquired the film adaptation rights in 2022.
