= Sushant Singh Rajput =

Indian actor (1986–2020)

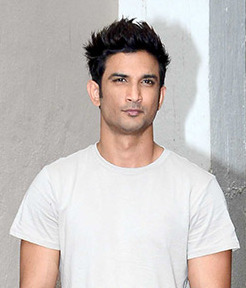
- Rajput at the promotions of M.S. Dhoni – The Untold Story in 2016
- Born: 21 January 1986; Patna, Bihar, India
- Died: 14 June 2020 (aged 34); Mumbai, Maharashtra, India
- Cause of death: Suicide by hanging
- Occupation: Actor
- Years active: 2008–2020

Sushant Singh Rajput (Note: Hindi: Suśānt Siṁh Rājpūt, pronounced [suːˈʃɑːnt sɪŋ(h) ˈrɑːdʒpuːt]) (21 January 1986 – 14 June 2020) was an Indian actor best known for his work in Hindi cinema. Rajput is the recipient of several accolades, including a Screen Award and three Filmfare Award nominations. He was featured twice on Forbes India's Celebrity 100 list, and was regarded as one of the most talented and versatile actors of his generation.

Rajput began his acting career after dropping out of his engineering course at the Delhi College of Engineering and entering the theatre industry in Mumbai. He moved on to feature in Hindi television serials, his debut show was the romantic drama Kis Desh Mein Hai Meraa Dil (2008), followed by the lead role in the soap opera Pavitra Rishta (2009–2011). He made his film debut with the film adaptation Kai Po Che! (2013) which became a critical and commercial success. He followed up with his starring roles as a tourist guide in the romantic comedy Shuddh Desi Romance (2013) and the titular detective in the mystery film Detective Byomkesh Bakshy! (2015). Rajput's highest-grossing releases came with a supporting role in the satire PK (2014), and from the title role in the sports biopic of Mahendra Singh Dhoni. For his performance in the latter, he received his first nomination for the Filmfare Award for Best Actor.

He earned acclaim for his performances in several notable films, including Kai Po Che! (2013), Detective Byomkesh Bakshy! (2015), M.S. Dhoni: The Untold Story (2016), Kedarnath (2018), Sonchiriya (2019), and Chhichhore (2019).

Rajput died by suicide at his home in Bandra, Mumbai, in June 2020, aged 34. Various controversies surrounded his death. The Narcotics Control Bureau claimed Rajput had been using various people to obtain drugs since 2018 and filed abetment charges against them. Abetment to suicide charges were filed and the case was handed to the Central Bureau of Investigation, who filed a closure report on 22 March 2025 ruling out any foul play. His last film, Dil Bechara (2020), was released posthumously on the streaming platform Hotstar.

== Early life and education ==
Sushant Singh Rajput was born in Patna in the state of Bihar to Krishna Kumar Singh and Usha Singh. His father is a retired technical officer and worked at Bihar State Handloom Corporation in Patna, and his mother was a homemaker. Rajput was the only son and the youngest of five siblings and had the nickname Gulshan. One of his four sisters, Mitu Singh, was a state-level cricket player. He studied at St. Karen's High School in Patna. His family moved to Delhi following his mother's death in 2002 where he completed his schooling for intermediate studies in the Kulachi Hansraj Model School.

Rajput was reportedly an avid reader who was deeply interested in astrophysics and won the National Olympiad in Physics. He secured admission in the Delhi College of Engineering (later renamed Delhi Technological University) to pursue a Bachelor of Engineering degree in mechanical engineering. According to Rajput, he did not have any interest in engineering but his family gave him no option which left him dissatisfied. He instead wanted to become an astronaut and later an air force pilot but was also interested in Bollywood, being a fan of Shah Rukh Khan.

== Career ==
=== 2006–2011: Early career and television ===
During his course at the Delhi College of Engineering, Rajput enrolled himself in Shiamak Davar's dance classes. Soon afterward, he also began attending acting classes under the theatre director Barry John. Rajput later stated that he found the experience to be liberating and wanted to continue doing it forever. He featured as a background dancer in the Dhoom Again song of Dhoom 2 and in Aishwarya Rai's performance at the closing ceremony of the 2006 Commonwealth Games. In 2006, he dropped out of his engineering course during his fourth year to begin a career in arts and performance. He moved to Mumbai, took up odd jobs and small roles alongside working in the theatre industry. Rajput eventually joined Nadira Babbar's theatre group called the Ekjute in which he remained for two and a half years.

He was spotted by a casting team of Balaji Telefilms while he was working at the Prithvi Theatre. Rajput was subsequently called for an audition and cast as a second lead in the television series Kis Desh Mein Hai Meraa Dil in 2008. He had secured the role of Preet Singh Juneja, the stepbrother of the lead named Harshad Chopda and entered the show in its seventh episode. The character was killed early in the show, but due to popularity among viewers was brought back in the series finale as a spirit looking on as his family celebrated coming out of difficult times. The performance had made an impression on the producer Ekta Kapoor who vouched for him to be cast as the lead in another series Pavitra Rishta, reportedly against the wishes of the hosting channel, Zee TV.

In Pavitra Rishta, Rajput was cast as Manav Deshmukh who was an "ideal son and husband" and co-starred along with Ankita Lokhande. The role was reportedly a breakthrough for him and for which he won various television awards, including his first award for best actor in the Indian Television Academy Awards 2010. He also won three major television awards in the categories of best male actor and most popular actor. In 2010, he joined the dance reality show Zara Nachke Dikha in its second season as part of the Mast Kalandar Boys team. On the Mother's Day special episode, the team dedicated a performance to Rajput's mother who had died. Later in the same year, he also took part in the fourth season of another dance competition reality show called Jhalak Dikhhla Jaa and was paired alongside the choreographer Shampa Sonthalia; they emerged as the runners-up of the season.

Rajput continued to act in Pavitra Rishta from its first airing in 2009 till his exit in 2011, having played the part of the protagonist of the series for two and a half years at the time of his exit. He had stated that he intended to move to the United States to study filmmaking and had already gained experience behind the scenes in the film Raaz 2, where he was an assistant director. Rajput made a later reappearance in the final episode of Pavitra Rishta in 2014 after gaining critical acclaim in Bollywood.

=== 2012–2015: Film debut and Yash Raj Films ===
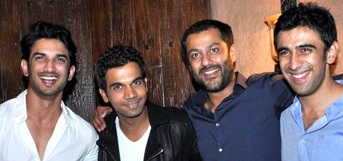
From left to right: Rajput, Rajkumar Rao, Abhishek Kapoor and Amit Sadh at the promotion of Kai Po Che! in 2013

In 2011, Rajput was spotted by Mukesh Chhabra, the casting director of Kai Po Che!, who invited him for an audition. He was in the process of enrolling for a course in filmmaking at Stanford University but decided to accept the offer. He was subsequently cast in the role of Ishaan Bhatt, a district-level cricketer who was a victim of politics in the selection fraternity and one of the three leads, along with Rajkummar Rao and Amit Sadh. The film was directed by Abhishek Kapoor and based on the Chetan Bhagat novel called The 3 Mistakes of My Life, which dealt with the life of three friends affected by the 2001 Gujarat earthquake and the 2002 Gujarat riots. It was released in 2013 and became a critical and commercial success. Rajput received a nomination for the Filmfare Awards in the category of best debut actor for his performance in the film.

Before the release of his debut film Kai Po Che!, Rajput was signed in by Rajkumar Hirani for a role in the Aamir Khan-starrer satirical drama called PK. In the film, he was cast as the boyfriend to Anushka Sharma's character of a journalist. He also entered into a deal with Yash Raj Films beginning with the starring role in the film Shuddh Desi Romance. The film was a romantic comedy, where Rajput played the character of Raghu Ram Sitaram, a tour guide who fell in love with a woman on the way to his own marriage, it featured Parineeti Chopra and Vaani Kapoor. Shuddh Desi Romance was released in 2013 and became a sleeper hit. Following the release of his first two films, Rajput was described by the veteran director Shekhar Kapur as "one of the most inspiring young actors to emerge out of India" and was occasionally referred to as the "next SRK". The film PK was later released in 2014 and became the highest grossing Indian film.

In June 2013, Yash Raj Films and Dibakar Banerjee Productions announced the joint production of Detective Byomkesh Bakshy! with Sushant Singh Rajput in the starring role. Rajput began working on the new project following the release of his second film Shuddh Desi Romance. The film was a mystery action-thriller featuring Byomkesh Bakshi, a fictional detective originally created by the Bengali writer Sharadindu Bandyopadhyay. Dibakar Banerjee, the director of the film and the IP rights holder of Byomkesh Bakshi stories had signed him in to play the part of the protagonist. Before the release, Rajput made a special appearance in the police crime drama CID in the character of Byomkesh Bakshy. The film was released on 3 April 2015, and failed to perform well in the box office, but received positive critical reviews. In September 2013, Rajput began collaborating with Shekhar Kapur for his upcoming project Paani, a film set in the future that showcased a world where wars were being fought over water. The film was initially reported to be starred by Hrithik Roshan and then Vivek Oberoi but finally went to Rajput after Yash Raj Films entered in its co-production and opted for his inclusion. He had reportedly attended workshops with Kapur for 10 months before the project was suspended in 2015 when the Yash Raj Films backed out of it. In the aftermath, Rajput ended his contract with the production house.

=== 2016–2017: Dhoni biopic, Raabta and Kedarnath ===
In 2011, a biopic on the life of the Indian cricket team captain Mahendra Singh Dhoni was conceived by Dhoni's manager, Arun Pandey. The project was initially faced with various difficulties including objections from the Board of Control for Cricket in India (BCCI) and Dhoni's demand for a large royalty. On 25 September 2014, Sushant Singh Rajput was announced as the actor who would play the role of Dhoni in the biopic which was titled M.S. Dhoni: The Untold Story and directed by Neeraj Pandey. The film was centered around the life of the cricketer beginning with his childhood in the city of Ranchi and leading up to the 2011 Cricket World Cup victory for India under his captaincy. Incidentally, Rajput wasn't adept at cricket and had to train regularly in the game for 13 months as well as capture the playing style of Dhoni for his portrayal in the film, he was coached by Kiran More who reportedly trained him in the regimen of a professional sportsperson rather than as an actor. The film was produced by Arun Pandey with Fox Star Studios and released on 2 October 2016. It became the 5th highest grossing Bollywood film of that year. Rajput received critical acclaim for his performance and nominations to a number of awards, including the Filmfare Awards, the International Indian Film Academy Awards and the winning nomination at the Indian Film Festival of Melbourne. He also made a cameo appearance in the comedy film Welcome to New York, which was released on 23 February 2018 and where the lead characters met Rajput but confused him for Mahendra Singh Dhoni.

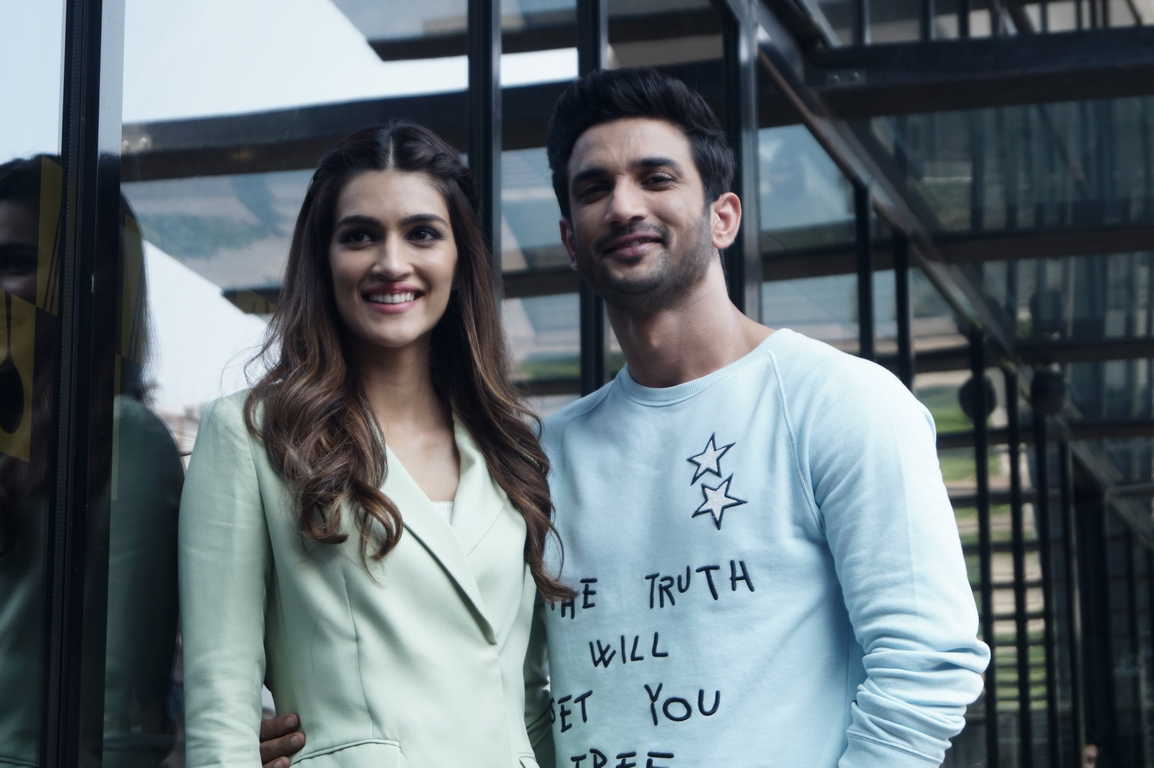
Rajput with Kriti Sanon at a promotional event for Raabta

During the release of M. S. Dhoni: The Untold Story, Rajput in an interview had stated that he was signed up to do five more films; namely Raabta, Takadum, Chanda Mama Door Ke, another biopic of an athlete and a film produced by Dharma Productions featuring Jacqueline Fernandez. Earlier in 2014, reports had emerged that Rajput was being signed in alongside Alia Bhatt for the starring roles in the largest budget production of the producer–directors Homi Adajania and Dinesh Vijan. In an announcement in February 2015, the film titled Raabta, produced by the Vijan owned Maddock Films and co-directed by Adajania and Vijan was publicised where Rajput and Bhatt were in the lead role. Bhatt however decided to opt out of the project in the same year, and the role of the female lead eventually went to Kriti Sanon. Rajput and Sanon later featured in a 2017 T-Series music video of the song named Paas Aao, composed by the duo Armaan and Amaal Mallik. In 2017, he was featured for first time in the Forbes India's Top 100 Celebrity list.

The second biopic that Rajput was to feature in was tentatively titled as Murli: The Unsung Hero, where he would play the role of the disabled jawan turned Paralympics gold medalist Murlikant Petkar. In June 2016, Rajput along with Parineeti Chopra and Irrfan Khan were also announced as the lead of the Adajania directed film called Takadum with shooting scheduled to begin in October but the project was being put on hold due to issues related to script re-adaptation. Meanwhile, the announcement of Rajput's role in Chanda Mama Door Ke had come in September 2016. In the film which was to be directed by Sanjay Puran Singh, Rajput would have starred alongside R. Madhavan and Nawazuddin Siddiqui and was cast in the role of an astronaut, for which he was even sent to NASA on a training module in 2017. He was also cast as the lead in the spy thriller film Romeo Akbar Walter in 2017, however he quit the project in the same year reportedly causing displeasure to the producer Bunty Walia who had publicised the film with him on the cover. Later in December 2017, it was announced that he was signed in by Abhishek Chaubey, the director of Udta Punjab for his next film titled Sonchiriya, where he would star alongside Bhumi Pednekar.

Raabta was released on 9 June 2017, which subsequently received mixed reviews from critics and emerged as a flop in the box office, unable to recover its large production cost. It was a time transcending love story, where Sushant Singh Rajput played the role of two characters who were reincarnations of each other. While the filming was primarily carried out in the city of Budapest, Hungary, in the Indian state of Punjab and in the island country of Mauritius. Earlier in March 2017, Rajput had also begun shooting alongside Jacqueline Fernandez for Karan Johar's Dharma Productions film, by then titled as Drive. The film was directed by Tarun Mansukhani and was a prequel to the 2014 film Bang Bang!, that had featured Hrithik Roshan and Katrina Kaif. Part of the shooting occurred in the city of Tel Aviv, Israel which was promoted by the Government of Israel as a part of its tourism and diplomatic initiative. The release was initially scheduled for 2 March 2018, but in a February announcement, the date was moved to 7 September 2018. The release was however postponed for a second time with no fixed release date due to creative disagreements between the director Mansukhani and the producer Karan Johar.

In the meantime in March 2017, Rajput was signed in by the director Abhishek Kapoor and the producer Ekta Kapoor for their film called Kedarnath. It was a love story set in the backdrop of the 2013 floods in Uttarakhand, where Rajput co-starred with Sara Ali Khan. He played the character of Mansoor, a Muslim porter who was also a devotee of Lord Shiva and whose livelihood revolved around the Shiv temple at Kedarnath. The shooting of the film began in September 2017 and was set to release by June 2018. During the shooting, Abhishek Kapoor who had previously been the director of Rajput's debut film Kai Po Che!, stated that Rajput was in much better form for Kedarnath and expected it to become an even bigger success. The film however soon became embroidered in controversy as the Bharatiya Janata Party alleged that it was promoting Jihad by showing an interfaith couple and called for the imposition of a ban on it. In the end, the film was banned from screening in 7 out of 13 districts in Uttarakhand and released on 7 December 2018. Despite the ban, it became a commercial success, although it didn't completely meet the projected success in the box office. Following the release, it was the second highest grossing among Rajput's starring films after the Dhoni biopic.

=== 2018–2020: Entrepreneurial work and later career ===
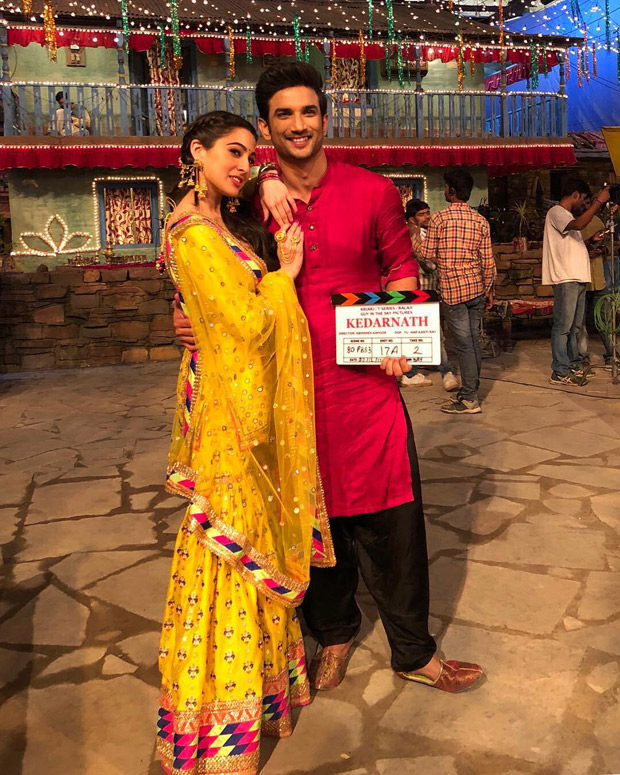
Rajput and Sara Ali Khan on the set of Kedarnath (2018)

On 2 May 2018, Rajput was inducted as a partner in a company named Innsaei Ventures, which was founded on 26 April 2018; following which he was appointed as one of its three directors, the others being Varun Mathur and Saurabh Mishra. Rajput and Mathur were credited as the co-founders and set to make an investment of ₹3 billion (equivalent to ₹4.4 billion or US$47 million in 2026) in the company. The company was named Innsaei after the Icelandic word for Institution and marketed as working in the fields related to intellectual property and emerging technologies. Within a week, he was signed in by NITI Aayog to become a brand ambassador of the Women Entrepreneurship Platform and for the promotion of the BHIM mobile payment app. Subsequently, Innsaei Ventures set up a fund of ₹200 million (equivalent to ₹290 million or US$3.1 million in 2026) in favour of the Women Entrepreneurship Platform. In the same year, Rajput announced the first creative product of Innsaei Ventures, a 12 biopic series where he would play the roles of various Indian historical characters between the years of 540 BC to 2015 CE.

In early 2018, Rajput began shooting for the film Sonchiriya. It was a historical drama set in the 1970s, where he played the role of a character named Lakhna, a lieutenant in a gang of dacoits; he was in the lead role alongside Bhumi Pednekar, Manoj Bajpayee, Ranvir Shorey and Ashutosh Rana. The film was directed by Abhishek Chaubey, produced by Ronnie Screwvala and featured the real life character of Daku Man Singh, played by Bajpayee. Released on 1 March 2019, it received a positive critical reception and won a number of awards but failed to become a commercial success. In 2018, he was also signed in by Nitesh Tiwari, the director of the blockbuster film Dangal for his new film titled Chhichhore, whose shooting began in September. It was a romantic comedy where Rajput played the character of Anirudh Pathak, a divorced husband who recounts his college life to his teenage son and opposite Maya, his ex-wife played by Shraddha Kapoor. Produced by Fox Star Studios and Nadiadwala Grandson Entertainment, the film was released on 6 September 2019, and became the third movie featuring Rajput to gross over ₹1 billion (equivalent to ₹1.4 billion or US$14 million in 2026) after PK and the Dhoni biopic. The film won the National Film Award for Best Feature Film in Hindi.

In an interview in January 2019, before the release of Sonchiriya, Rajput had stated that he was in the talks for 12 other films of which Chanda Mama Door Ke and the biopic of Murlikant Petkar were yet to be finalised. He was to feature in Rifleman, but the film got into legal trouble over copyright issues shortly after its announcement and could not be made. He had opted out of the production of Chanda Mama Door Ke in the previous year citing timing conflict in scheduling for its shooting and had stated that he would produce his own space film through Innsaei Ventures. In September 2019, a second company named Vividrage Rhealtyx was registered with a paid up capital of ₹100,000 (equivalent to ₹140,000 or US$1,400 in 2026); Rajput became one of the three directors of the company, the others being Rhea Chakraborty and Showik Chakraborty. Meanwhile, the long delayed release of the film titled Drive had its premiere finalised and was released directly on Netflix in November 2019, as a cost cutting measure. On 6 January 2020, Rajput also founded a nonprofit organisation (NGO) named Front India for World Foundation with the stated intent of working towards the eradication of poverty, hunger and malnutrition and promotion of better healthcare and sanitation. Prior to that, on behalf of one of his fans, he donated ₹10 million (US$110,000) to the Chief Minister's Relief Fund following the 2018 Kerala floods. In 2019, he featured the second time in Forbes' annual Top 100 Celebrity list.

Since 2017, Rajput was signed in for the directorial debut of Mukesh Chhabra; Fox Star Studios had employed Chhabra for a Hindi language remake of The Fault in Our Stars, a Hollywood hit film produced by 20th Century Fox. Chabbra had also been the casting director who had first spotted him for Kai Po Che!, which was Rajput's debut film. The shooting for the film began on 9 July 2018, in the city of Jamshedpur, Jharkhand. During the time of the shooting, Rajput had remarked that he shared a great bond with Chhabra and had promised Chhabra that he would appear in his first as well. Based on the novel by the same name The Fault in Our Stars written by the author John Green, the film was initially titled Kizie aur Manny and was scheduled to release in theatres in 2019. Rajput co-starred alongside Sanjana Sanghi and played the character of Manny, a patient of the bone cancer osteosarcoma; the role in the Hindi remake was a reprisal of the role of Ansel Elgort. It also notably featured Saif Ali Khan and musical compositions of A. R. Rahman. The title was later renamed to Dil Bechara and the release date moved to 8 May 2020. The slated release of the film however did not occur due to restrictions imposed during the COVID-19 pandemic. In the end, it was posthumously released on the streaming platform Disney+ Hotstar and became a record breaker in its first 24 hours viewership, having gathered approximately 95 million viewers. The director Uday Singh Gauri claimed after Rajput's death that he was in talks with him about a film based on the 2008 Mumbai attacks.

== Personal life ==
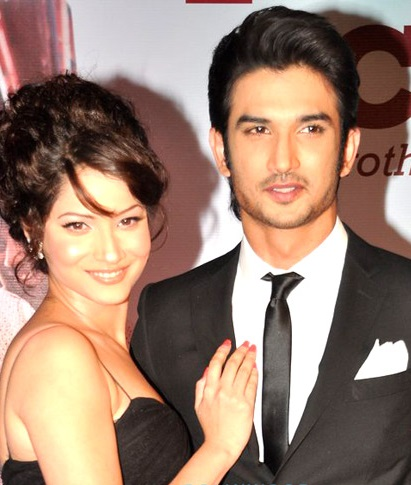
Rajput with Ankita Lokhande at Kai Po Che's premiere in 2013

Rajput's personal relationships have been the subject of widespread media attention. In 2011, Rajput publicly proposed to his Pavitra Rishta co-star Ankita Lokhande during a national broadcast of the dance competition show Jhalak Dikhhla Jaa; both of them had participated in the show as competing contestants. The couple began dating after their first meeting on the set of Pavitra Rishta, where they had been cast as husband and wife to each other. In 2012, they began living together, and reports of an imminent marriage between the two occasionally cropped up in the media. In an interview, Rajput stated that marriage and cohabitation were no different and that it was hypocritical to treat the former as sacred and the latter as a crime. At an event, he had said, "I am very transparent about my relationships. I mean I will not hesitate to say that I am in a relationship".

In 2014, rumours that they were already secretly married due to family pressure were denied by the couple. In January 2016, Rajput confirmed that a lavish wedding would take place in December, but the relationship ended prior to that, with the pair maintaining silence on the reasons for the cancellation. In a 2021 interview, Lokhande said that Rajput wanted to go ahead in his career and they ended their relationship mutually.

After the break-up, Rajput's relationship status became the subject of speculation and gossip. He was rumoured to be dating his Raabta co-star Kriti Sanon which was denied by both of them. In 2017, Rajput courted controversy when he came out in support of the producers of Padmaavat whose sets were vandalised by members of the Rajput Karni Sena. That same year, he became the co-owner of Delhi Gladiators, a team in the Super Boxing League. In preparation for his role in Chanda Mama Door Ke, he was given the opportunity to train at NASA where he intended to go back and complete his instructor training, aspiring to be chosen for the 2024 Artemis program. Retaining his interest in astronomy and astrophysics, he purchased the high end Meade LX-600 16" telescope for stargazing purposes. He also had a collection of 125 books including a six-volume theoretical physics series. Rajput stated in an August 2017 interview that his collection was not for film research, but covered personal interests in multiple disciplines, including cognitive science and behavioural economics. He was reportedly an avid reader who would bring books during tours for film shooting.

In 2018, he was the subject of another rumour regarding his Kedarnath co-star Sara Ali Khan. The rumours were never confirmed, as, before the two supposedly broke up, Rajput refused to comment on the claims. Later in the next year, it was reported that he was dating actress Rhea Chakraborty and that they intended to keep the matter private. When questioned, he reportedly unwittingly confirmed the relationship by stating that if interviewers asked questions that were only about him, he could answer at his own discretion but he would also have to ask "somebody" before confirming any details. Chakraborty and Rajput were occasionally spotted on "dates" and outings in Mumbai, and on a vacation to the Himalayan region of Ladakh.

After Rajput's death, Chakraborty confirmed that she was his girlfriend and that he would refuse medication, relying instead on yoga and meditation. According to Rajput's father, the actor mentioned his plans to marry in 2021 but did not reveal his intended bride; Ankita Lokhande was the only girlfriend that his father had known about.

== Death ==
On 14 June 2020, Rajput, aged 34, was found dead in his home in Bandra, Mumbai. He had reportedly shown signs of clinical depression and was diagnosed with bipolar disorder. The postmortem report concluded that the cause of death was "asphyxia due to hanging", calling it a "clear case of suicide." Authorities and a forensic medical team from the All India Institute of Medical Sciences, New Delhi, confirmed that Rajput's death was not a case of murder.

On 25 July, Rajput's family lodged a first information report with police in Patna, where his father lives, accusing Rhea Chakraborty and five others of abetment of suicide.

On 31 July, Enforcement Directorate (ED) filed a case to investigate the money laundering of Rajput's money from his bank accounts by Chakraborty, her parents and associates. On 19 August 2020, the Supreme Court of India allowed the Central Bureau of Investigation (CBI), the Indian national government's top investigating agency, to take control of the investigation and ordered the CBI to look into any future cases registered in relation to Rajput's death. Later, the Narcotics Control Bureau (NCB) also filed a case to investigate drug peddling, based on phone chats forwarded to it by ED during its investigation.

On 8 September, Rhea Chakraborty was arrested by the NCB in a drug case linked to the investigation of the death probe. Prior to the arrest, 9 others were arrested by the NCB in the drug case including Rhea's brother, Showik Chakraborty. On 12 July 2022, the NCB filed draft charges against 35 people, including Rhea Chakraborty and her brother. The NCB claimed that Rajput had been using numerous people to obtain drugs since 2018 and accused his flatmate Pithani and others of "aiding and abetting" Rajput to "extreme drug addiction."

On 7 September, Chakraborty filed an FIR against the late actor's sisters, claiming they had supplied him psychotrophic anti-depressants without proper medical consultation and using a forged prescription. She requested an investigation into whether these had resulted in his suicide or a decline in his mental state. The following month, Rajput's sisters asked the High Court to cancel the FIR. The Bombay High Court agreed to invalidate the FIR against his sister Meetu but upheld the FIR against his sister Priyanka, stating that there was "prima facie evidence" against her. The Supreme Court also rejected an appeal filed by Priyanka Singh and the filing was handed to the CBI to investigate.

On 22 March 2025, the Central Bureau of Investigation filed a closure report ruling out any foul play.

== Filmography ==
=== Films ===
Year	Title	Role	Notes	Ref.
2013	Kai Po Che!	Ishaan "Ish" Bhatt	Debut film role	
2013	Shuddh Desi Romance	Raghu Ram		
2014	PK	Sarfaraz Yousuf		
2015	Detective Byomkesh Bakshy!	Detective Byomkesh Bakshy		
2016	M.S. Dhoni: The Untold Story	Mahendra Singh Dhoni		
2017	Raabta	Jilaan / Shiv Kakkar		
2018	Welcome to New York	Himself	Special appearance	
2018	Kedarnath	Mansoor Khan		
2019	Sonchiriya	Lakhan Singh / Lakhna		
2019	Chhichhore	Anirudh "Anni" Pathak		
2019	Drive	Samar	Final film role	
2020	Dil Bechara	Immanuel "Manny" Rajkumar Jr.	Posthumous release	

=== Television ===
Year	Title	Role	Notes	Ref.
2008–2009	Kis Desh Mein Hai Meraa Dil	Preet Juneja		
2009–2011	Pavitra Rishta	Manav Deshmukh		
2010	Zara Nachke Dikha	Contestant	Team "Mast Kalandar Boys"	
2010–2011	Jhalak Dikhhla Jaa 4	Contestant	Runner-up	
2014	Pavitra Rishta	Manav Deshmukh	Finale appearance	
2015	CID	Byomkesh Bakshy	Special appearance in Episode 1211	

=== Music video ===
Year	Title	Performer	Ref.
2017	"Paas Aao"	Armaan Malik & Amaal Mallik	

== Awards and nominations ==
Year	Award	Category	Film or Series	Result	Ref.
2009	Indian Telly Awards	Most Popular Actor (Male)	Pavitra Rishta	Nominated	
2010	Indian Television Academy Awards	Most Popular Actor (Male)	Pavitra Rishta	Won	
2010	BIG Star Entertainment Awards	Best Television Actor (Male)	Pavitra Rishta	Won	
2010	Gold Awards	Best Actor in a Lead Role	Pavitra Rishta	Won	
2011	Gold Awards	Best Actor in a Lead Role	Pavitra Rishta	Won	
2011	FICCI Frames Excellence Honours	Best TV Actor (Male)	Pavitra Rishta	Won	
2014	Producers Guild Film Awards	Best Male Debut	Kai Po Che!	Won	
2014	Producers Guild Film Awards	Best Actor in a Leading Role	Kai Po Che!	Nominated	
2014	Screen Awards	Best Male Debut	Kai Po Che!	Won	
2014	Zee Cine Awards	Best Male Debut	Kai Po Che!	Nominated	
2014	IIFA Awards	Best Actor in a Leading Role	Kai Po Che!	Nominated	
2014	Filmfare Awards	Best Debut Actor	Kai Po Che!	Nominated	
2016	Screen Awards	Best Actor (Critics)	M.S Dhoni: The Untold Story	Won	
2017	Filmfare Awards	Best Actor	M.S Dhoni: The Untold Story	Nominated	
2017	Zee Cine Awards	Best Actor – Male	M.S Dhoni: The Untold Story	Nominated	
2017	Stardust Awards	Best Actor	M.S Dhoni: The Untold Story	Nominated	
2017	International Indian Film Academy Awards	Best Actor (Male)	M.S Dhoni: The Untold Story	Nominated	
2017	Indian Film Festival of Melbourne	Best Actor	M.S Dhoni: The Untold Story	Won	
2020	Screen Awards	Best Actor (Critics)	Chhichhore	Nominated	
2021	Filmfare Awards	Best Actor (Male)	Dil Bechara	Nominated	

== See also ==
- List of Indian film actors
