= Hansraj =

Hanshraj or Hans Raj may refer to:

== People ==
- Hansraj Bhardwaj (born 1937), Indian politician
- Hansraj Gangaram Ahir (born 1954), member of the 14th Lok Sabha of India
- Hansraj Gupta (1902–1988), Indian mathematician specialising in number theory
- Hans Raj Hans (born 1964), Indian singer
- Hans Raj Khanna (1912–2008), judge at the Supreme Court of India (1971–1977)
- Jugal Hansraj (born 1972), Indian actor and director presently based at Mumbai
- Lala Hansraj Gupta, educationist, social worker and philanthropist, Padma Vibhushan recipient
- Mahatma Hansraj (1864–1938), follower of Swami Dayanand, who founded Dayanand Anglo-Vedic Schools System in India in 1886

== Institutions ==
- Hans Raj College, Delhi
- Hans Raj Model School, New Delhi
- Hansraj Morarji Public School, combined primary, junior and senior school in Mumbai, India
- Kulachi Hansraj Model School, Dayanand Anglo Vedic school established in 1972 by the late Shri Darbari Lal
