= 2 States (2014 film) =

2014 Indian film written and directed by Abhishek Varman

- Theatrical release poster
- Directed by: Abhishek Varman
- Screenplay by: Abhishek Varman
- Dialogues by: Hussain Dalal
- Story by: Abhishek Varman; Chetan Bhagat
- Based on: 2 States by Chetan Bhagat
- Produced by: Karan Johar; Sajid Nadiadwala
- Starring: Arjun Kapoor; Alia Bhatt
- Cinematography: Binod Pradhan
- Edited by: Namrata Rao
- Music by: Songs: Shankar–Ehsaan–Loy; Background Score: Tubby-Parik
- Production companies: Dharma Productions; Nadiadwala Grandson Entertainment
- Distributed by: UTV Motion Pictures
- Release date: 18 April 2014; (India)
- Running time: 150 minutes
- Country: India
- Language: Hindi
- Box office: ₹175 crore

2 States is a 2014 Indian Hindi-language romantic comedy-drama film directed by Abhishek Varman and produced by Karan Johar and Sajid Nadiadwala. Based on Chetan Bhagat's 2009 novel of the same name with the story rewritten by Varman and Bhagat, the film stars Arjun Kapoor and Alia Bhatt with Amrita Singh, Ronit Roy, Revathi and Shiv Kumar Subramaniam in supporting roles.

Distributed by UTV Motion Pictures, 2 States opened in global cinemas on 18 April 2014. Praised for its music, cast performances, story and direction, the film earned ₹175 crore (US$19 million) in worldwide markets, thus emerging as a critical and commercial success. At the 60th Filmfare Awards, 2 States received 8 nominations, including Best Film, Best Director (Varman), Best Supporting Actor (Roy) and Best Supporting Actress (Singh), and won 2 awards – Best Music Director (Shankar–Ehsaan–Loy) and Best Debut Director (Varman).

== Plot ==
Krish Malhotra, a fresh engineer from IIT Delhi pursuing his MBA at IIM Ahmedabad, comes from an affluent Punjabi Hindu family based in New Delhi. His mother, Kavita, is in a troubled relationship with his alcoholic father, Vikram Malhotra, with whom he has strained relations. He is immediately smitten when he meets Ananya Swaminathan, a fellow student from a conservative Tamil Brahmin family in Chennai. When she tells him she wants to study with him, he agrees, and the two gradually become friends. After a minor pause in meeting her, Krish eventually confesses his feelings for her one night, and the two share a kiss and have sex. They begin dating and live together for the next few months on campus. Krish confides in Ananya that his real passion is writing, which he wants to pursue as a career. As the two attend their interviews on campus drives, Krish proposes to Ananya, and she gladly accepts. Krish gets selected for Yes Bank, while Ananya is selected for Sunsilk.

The couple attempts to introduce their parents to each other during their convocation ceremony, but to their dismay, a loud Kavita does not get along with Ananya's reserved Tamil parents, Radha and Shiv. As Ananya joins her marketing job in Chennai, Krish returns to Delhi with the choice of his workplace in his hands. Kavita urges him to stay in Delhi and criticizes his relationship with Ananya, citing cultural differences and telling him to get into an arranged marriage with a Punjabi girl. There is still friction between Krish and Vikram, and much to his dysfunctional family‘s chagrin, Krish shifts his job to Chennai to stay in touch with Ananya.

During this time, Krish tries hard to win over Ananya's family. Initially, her family disapproves of him, but gradually, he builds a rapport with the family. He tutors her younger brother Manjunath "Manju" Swaminathan for the IIT entrance exam, gets Radha an opportunity to sing for an event at his workplace, and helps Shiv create his first PowerPoint presentation. Before departing for New Delhi, Krish confesses his intentions to marry Ananya to her family, which everyone finally accepts. Krish and Ananya then travel to Delhi to win over his family. Similarly, Kavita and her family are initially hostile towards Ananya but come to like her after she publicly saves Krish's cousin Minty's wedding from being canceled due to a dispute over an excessive dowry. Krish reveals to Ananya that his bitterness towards Vikram was mainly because of his angry outbursts, which escalated one day when he hit him after he hit Kavita in an altercation, causing a strain on their relationship.

Krish and Ananya decide to take a vacation in Mumbai with their families before the wedding, hoping they will get to know each other better. However, the trip does not go as planned due to Kavita's continuous remarks about their cultural differences. Furthermore, Ananya and her parents overhear Krish falsely assuring his mother she can treat Ananya however she wants after marriage. Having had enough of the insults, Ananya breaks up with Krish, and they go their separate ways. Krish becomes depressed and starts writing about his story with Ananya. He also visits her in Chennai, where she tells him to stop all communication. Later, he gets a call from Ananya, who reveals Vikram had secretly come down to Chennai to speak to her parents, apologizing for Kavita's shallow behavior in an effort to change their decision. The two families finally come together to get the couple married in Chennai. At first, Vikram declines to attend the wedding to prevent any further embarrassment, but at the last minute, he flies down to Chennai and apologizes to Kavita for his abusive behavior over the years. After getting married, Ananya gives birth to twin boys. Krish resigns from his job at the bank and publishes his book, 2 States, based on his and Ananya's lives.

== Cast ==
- Arjun Kapoor as Krish Malhotra, A Punjabi, Ananya's husband, Kavita and Vikram's son
- Alia Bhatt as Ananya Swaminathan, a Tamilian, Krish's love interest later wife, Shiv and Radha's daughter
- Amrita Singh as Kavita Malhotra, Krish's mother, Vikram's wife
- Ronit Roy as Vikram Malhotra, Krish's father, Kavita's husband
- Revathi as Radha Swaminathan, Ananya's mother, Shiv's wife
- Shiv Kumar Subramaniam as Shiv Swaminathan, Ananya's father, Radha's husband
- Sharang Natrajan as Manju Swaminathan, Shiv and Radha's son, Ananya's brother
- Amit Bhargav as Harish
- Achint Kaur as Shipra Mehra
- Dilip Merala as Mohit Oberoi
- Aru Krishansh Verma as Dharamveer "Duke"
- Bikramjeet Kanwarpal as Rajji Mama
- Neil Shah as Ramanujan
- Madhu Anand Chandhock as Duke's mother

== Production ==
=== Casting ===
Saif Ali Khan and Priyanka Chopra were the first choices for the leads, and the film was to be directed by Siddharth Anand. Later, it was announced that Shah Rukh Khan and Asin Thottumkal would play lead roles while Vishal Bhardwaj took over as director. The role of Krish Malhotra was also offered to Imran Khan, who instead chose to work on Matru Ki Bijlee Ka Mandola (2013). Arjun Kapoor was eventually cast as the lead. The female lead was then offered to Anushka Sharma, who rejected it as she didn't find the role interesting enough, and later Alia Bhatt was signed. Amrita Singh and Ronit Roy were cast as Arjun Kapoor's parents, and Revathi and Shiv Kumar Subramaniam were cast as Alia Bhatt's parents.

=== Filming ===
Principal photography commenced on 29 January 2013 with the shooting of a song. Parts of the film were shot in Chennai, Delhi, and the Indian Institute of Management Ahmedabad in August 2013. Alia sported an Indian Fusion look in the film and her costumes were designed by Manish Malhotra. Speaking about her character, Alia said that she is a City Girl who speaks Tamil only with her parents.

The song "Offo" was choreographed and conceptualized by Remo D'Souza as a celebration of several Indian festivals in a time lapse of almost one year. It was shot over four days at the IIM Ahmedabad campus and Filmistan Studio in Mumbai.

== Soundtrack ==
The film score was composed by Tubby-Parik while the songs were composed by Shankar–Ehsaan–Loy, while the lyrics for the songs were penned by Amitabh Bhattacharya. The first song, Offo, sung by Aditi Singh Sharma and Amitabh Bhattacharya, was released on 7 March 2014. The second song, Locha-E-Ulfat, sung by Benny Dayal, was released on 13 March 2014. The soundtrack of the film was released on 16 March 2014. The medley song "Isaiyin Alai" at the concert was sung by Mahalaxmi Iyer. Shankar–Ehsaan–Loy won the Filmfare Award for Best Music Director and the IIFA Award for Best Music Director for the film's soundtrack. The songs "Offo", "Mast Magan", "Iski Uski", "Locha E Ulfat", and "Chandaniya" were declared chartbusters.

== Release ==
=== Theatrical ===
2 States's teaser trailer was released along with Hasee Toh Phasee, which released on 7 February 2014.

=== Box office ===
==== India ====
According to Box Office India, 2 States had "excellent" first day figures of ₹120 million (US$1.3 million). The collections for second day were around ₹118 million (US$1.3 million) taking its two-day total to ₹238 million (US$2.5 million), receiving a "fantastic" response in circuits like Mumbai, Mysore, Delhi-UP, CP Berar, CI, Nizam and Rajasthan. The film was declared a "Super Hit" by Box Office India in light of its first two days' performance. With a very good run in multiplexes and single screens alike, it managed a three-day nett of ₹280 million (US$3.0 million). 2 States had a final domestic net of ₹811 million (US$8.7 million).

==== International ====
According to Box Office India, 2 States grossed US$5.85 million internationally, and was the second highest overseas grosser of 2014 in Bollywood after Jai Ho at that point.

=== Critical reception ===
Taran Adarsh of Bollywood Hungama awarded the film 4.5 out of 5 stars, and noted, "On the whole, 2 States is one of the finest movies to come out of the Hindi film industry of late. This is one of those rare Hindi movies that commands a repeat viewing. Strongly recommended!" Critic Saurabh Dwivedi, writing for India Today, gave the film 4 out of 5 stars, and published, "2 States can be a good mirror for parents to understand their children. So take along your parents and enjoy the film." Meena Iyer of The Times of India gave the film 3.5 out of 5 stars, and wrote, "What makes 2 States work is the simple narrative told humorously. Adapted as it is, from one of author Chetan Bhagat's best-selling works, the film, just like the book before it, is light-hearted. Chetan's funny one-liners and life-view are studiously borrowed by the director for his screen outing. And though there is a sense of deja-vu, for those who have read the book, the movie still manages to charm and surprise." Paloma Sharma of Rediff.com gave the movie 3.5 out of 5 stars and opined, "There's nothing that should keep you from watching 2 States". Mohar Basu of Koimoi gave the film 3 out of 5 stars, and wrote, "2 States is barely unwatchable but misses the magic of Chetan Bhagat's novel. As a stand-alone, it is endearingly done with Alia and Arjun's scorching chemistry coming off as adorable. The Bhagat fan in me is disappointed, but the cinemagoer isn't." DNA posted, the first half of the film is light and breezy and the second dramatic and emotional, perhaps a better balance would have helped the post-interval portion which seems heavy.

Hindustan Times' Anupama Chopra gave the film 2.5 stars out of 5, and said, "In 2 States, the story is the weakest link. The film is bolstered by talented actors, gorgeous songs by Shankar-Ehsaan-Loy, nice styling, sumptuous production design, and a few sparkling moments. But in the second half, 2 States falls apart. At almost two-and-a-half hours, it's also stretched so thin that by the time Krish and Ananya walk into the sunset, you are long past caring". Concerning Kapoor and Bhatt, she said, "Arjun, departing from his earlier violent roles, makes a nicely goofy and later subdued lover boy, but it's Alia who lights up the screen." Saibal Chatterjee of NDTV gave the film 2.5 out of 5 stars, and wrote, "2 States is a cross-culture love story that strives to be sweet, funny and emotionally wrenching all at once. It is occasionally funny and sweet in parts all right, but the family drama at the film's core has a severely stultified feel. The trouble is that the impending wedding remains impending far too long to sustain interest... it sets out to be a slice-of-life drama about a real couple grappling with the politics of inter-community marriage, but it fails to generate enough energy and warmth to draw the audience into a tight clinch". Shubra Gupta of The Indian Express gave the film 2.5 out of 5 stars, and said, "2 States... sets out to be a solid, emotionally satisfying rom-com, and goes well for a bit but then turns into a too-stretched-out 'jhagda' between the two sets of North-South parents. The smooth, engaging first half descends, post-interval, into mopey melodrama, and I got impatient waiting for the inevitable resolution." She praised Bhatt's performance, saying, "...Alia Bhatt is a surprise. She leaves behind her earlier films, and gets into her character: she may not be an authentic 'Southie' in terms of body language, but she is all girl, easy and fresh and natural."

== Awards ==
21st Screen Awards:

- Best Film Marketing

60th Filmfare Awards:

- Best Music Director – Shankar–Ehsaan–Loy
- Best Debut Director – Abhishek Varman
- Nominated – Best Film – Karan Johar and Sajid Nadiadwala
- Nominated – Best Director – Abhishek Varman
- Nominated – Best Supporting Actor – Ronit Roy
- Nominated – Best Supporting Actress – Amrita Singh
- Nominated – Best Male Playback Singer – Arijit Singh for "Mast Magan"
- Nominated – Best Male Playback Singer – Benny Dayal for "Locha-E-Ulfat"

7th Mirchi Music Awards:

- Album of The Year – Shankar–Ehsaan–Loy, Amitabh Bhattacharya
- Music Composer of The Year – Shankar–Ehsaan–Loy for "Mast Magan"
- Nominated – Song representing Sufi tradition – "Mast Magan"
- Nominated – Best Background Score – Tubby-Park

== Remake ==
A remake in Telugu with the same name starring Adivi Sesh and Shivani, was planned but was shelved.
