= What Young India Wants =

2012 book by Chetan Bhagat

- First edition
- Author: Chetan Bhagat
- Language: English
- Genre: Nonfiction
- Publisher: Rupa Publications
- Publication date: August 6, 2012
- Publication place: India
- Media type: Paperback
- Pages: 181
- ISBN: 978-81-291-2021-2
- Website: www.chetanbhagat.com

What Young India Wants is a compilation of speeches and essays by Chetan Bhagat, published in 2012. It focuses on Indian society and politics from the perspective of the country's youth. The book revolves around Bhagat's thoughts and innovations on how to improve the Indian economy through social reforms. It also criticizes the dysfunction of the Indian government. Bhagat writes about how India can be a progressive society in the future. He talks about the rampant corruption in India and how society should change to be rid of it. These themes are central to his dream of a free and forward-thinking India.
