= Revolution 2020 =

2011 novel by Chetan Bhagat

Revolution 2020: Love, Corruption, Ambition
- First edition
- Author: Chetan Bhagat
- Language: English
- Genre: Fiction, Politics, Romance
- Publisher: Rupa Publications
- Publication date: 5 October 2011
- Publication place: India
- Media type: Paperback
- Pages: 296
- Website: www.chetanbhagat.com

Revolution 2020: Love, Corruption, Ambition is a 2011 novel by Chetan Bhagat. Its story is concerned with a love triangle, corruption and a journey of self-discovery. R2020 has addressed the issue of how private coaching institutions exploit aspiring engineering students and how parents put their lifetime's earnings on stake for these classes so that their children can crack engineering exams and change the fortune of the family. While a handful accomplish their dreams, others sink into disaster. The book is available as an Audiobook on Amazon.

The author stated that the novel is based on the "rampant corruption" apparent in the Indian educational system, with the choice of Varanasi as a setting emerging through "a special connection to the city" following his visit. He further said "it is one of our oldest cities, and people there now have modern aspirations. I thought the contrast would be interesting. The city also has a lot of character."

== Plot ==
Set in Varanasi, Gopal, Aarti and Raghav have been best friends since school. As teenagers, Gopal has fallen in love with Aarti, often pushing to be more than friends. Aarti consistently rebuffs, expressing that she values their friendship and isn't ready for a relationship with anybody.

Gopal and Raghav are both studying to get into engineering colleges, but Gopal gets a low rank in the All India Engineering Entrance Exams, while Raghav is among the toppers. To help improve his rank, Gopal moves to Kota alone to join reputed coaching classes to resit the exam the following year. Raghav goes on to pass the IIT entrance exam as well, and starts attending Banaras Hindu University.

During Gopal's absence in Kota, Aarti and Raghav develop feelings for each other, and Aarti tells Gopal about her relationship when they chat online. Gopal is heartbroken and lashes out at her, causing them to lose touch briefly and Gopal to fall behind in his course. When they rekindle their friendship, Gopal begins to study hard again, but gets a low rank once more after sitting the AIEEE exam for the second time. Gopal returns home to Varanasi, where his father dies shortly after learning of his low rank. Meanwhile, Raghav and Aarti's relationship is flourishing, and Raghav has found his passion in activism and being on his university's newspaper committee.

Gopal decides to look at local engineering institutes for another shot, but is put in contact with MLA Shukla, who decides to build an engineering college on the highly valuable land that Gopal's family owns, making Gopal the institution's director. After some deliberation, Gopal agrees to the deal and joins the system of corruption in India in order to build the college with the politician's black money. He finds it difficult and painful to get used to giving so many bribes to government officials to get what they need for the university, but works tirelessly for three years to finally set it up. He eventually loses touch with Aarti too (having stopped contact with Raghav when learning of his initial top rank), only to reconnect at Raghav's university graduation party.

Raghav, now having dropped his promising engineering career for his passion for journalism, exposes the corruption-funded college, but is subsequently fired by MLA Shukla and Gopal from his newshouse. Raghav decides to start his own newspaper, calling it Revolution 2020 after the revolution he believes India must have to expose its corrupt system. After another exposé on the corruption of MLA Shukla, Raghav's newspaper is shut down by the politicians and their thugs, and he loses almost everything.

Still passionate about his activism, Raghav has been neglecting his relationship with Aarti, often not having time for her and being emotionally unavailable. As Aarti and Gopal reconnect, Aarti starts a new role at the new Ramada Hotel in Varanasi, and eventually starts meeting up with Gopal after work for coffee, movies, dinner, and evenings at the park. On a whim, Gopal books a room at Aarti's hotel one evening, convincing her to come visit him after her shift ends. Aarti and Gopal end up having sex, after which she is riddled with guilt, but the two eventually begin an affair aside from her relationship with Raghav. Aarti finally reciprocates Gopal's feelings, and Gopal decides to let Raghav know about their relationship.

Gopal goes to Raghav's office but feels troubled after a chance encounter with a poor farmer and his son who had come to Raghav for help. Feeling shame and guilt, Gopal soon realises the folly of money and power, and decides to let go of Aarti as well, perhaps realising that they were never meant to be together and Raghav would always remain Aarti's love.

Gopal devises a plan and, with the help of MLA Shukla, who is now in prison for the exposé on him, invites two prostitutes to his home on his birthday, timing it to overlap with Aarti's 'surprise' visit. As planned, Aarti sees the two girls in bed with Gopal and breaks up with him immediately, devastated. Next, Gopal anonymously helps get Raghav his job back at his old newshouse, and suggests Raghav go into politics to garner the support he needs for his revolution. Raghav is extremely grateful, and invites Gopal to his upcoming wedding with Aarti, which he does not formally attend.

Gopal continues growing in his business, now incredibly successful, but is still heartbroken over Aarti. Despite sacrificing his lifelong love to do the right thing, Gopal still doubts whether he is a good person or not. After listening to Gopal's story, the author confirms that he is indeed a good man.

== Reviews ==
- Rituparna Chatterjee Review. IBN Live
- Daily Bhaskar Review
- Stories In Moments Review
