= Hello (2008 film) =

2008 Indian film by Atul Agnihotri

- Theatrical release poster
- Directed by: Atul Agnihotri
- Written by: Atul Agnihotri; Chetan Bhagat
- Based on: One Night @ the Call Center by Chetan Bhagat
- Produced by: Paul Parmar
- Starring: Sharman Joshi; Sohail Khan; Isha Koppikar; Gul Panag; Amrita Arora; Sharat Saxena; Arbaaz Khan
- Narrated by: Katrina Kaif
- Cinematography: Sanjay F. Gupta
- Edited by: Umesh Gupta
- Music by: Sajid–Wajid
- Production companies: Percept Picture Company; Columbia Pictures; Mirah Entertainment; Funky Buddha Media
- Release date: 10 October 2008
- Country: India
- Language: Hindi
- Budget: ₹14 crore
- Box office: ₹17.96 crore

Hello is a 2008 Indian Hindi-language comedy thriller film directed by Atul Agnihotri, starring Sharman Joshi, Sohail Khan, Gul Panag, Isha Koppikar, Amrita Arora, and Sharat Saxena in the lead roles. The film is based on Chetan Bhagat's novel, One Night @ the Call Center. Salman Khan and Katrina Kaif made cameo appearance. It was released on 10 October 2008.

== Plot ==
Salman Khan is a Bollywood actor who is on a live tour near Pune, where his private jet crashes. Luckily, he survives, and in a lounge, he meets a girl. She tells him a story about six friends and their boss, who all work together at a Mumbai-based call centre. They are instructed never to reveal their location and speak with an American accent by a Boston-based company. There is Shyam (Sam), Priyanka, Varun, Esha, Radhika, and Military Uncle. Their boss, Subhash Bakshi, attempts to further his career by plagiarising software, agreeing to lay off 40% of the Indian workforce and relocate to Boston. Although these six friends work together, they still go through some struggles: Shyam tries his best to move on from Priyanka after their breakup, Esha gets annoyed by Varun when she thinks he likes her, Radhika lives with her mother-in-law who is of high traditional values and gets berated by her, and Military Uncle wants a visa to see his son and grandson in America. Bakshi turns their names into American names and to speak with a somewhat fluent American accent.

One night, Shyam and his friends are forced to work in the nighttime shift until 4:00 in the morning. At work, Shyam realizes that Priyanka is going through a tough time with her arranged marriage with Ganesh, a wealthy Indian-American who stays in the United States. Shyam taps into the phone line thanks to Varun helping him so that he can overhear their conversations to try and break off the arranged marriage. Radhika is heartbroken after learning that her husband Anuj is having an extramarital affair with another woman. When Bakshi calls all of them to his office for a meeting, he talks with his American boss, and the six friends overhear his plan about him going to Boston and steal Shyam and Varun's website manual along with him. Esha gets upset telling Shyam that someone who promised her a successful modeling career used her for nothing. Shyam talks to Varun about this until he loses his temper and starts destroying the cafeteria. At a party, they all get drunk and decide to head back home since it is late. The six are on their way home until they approach an accident and are stuck on top of a cliff in their car, and if anybody tries to move, the car may lose its balance and fall off the cliff. They all remain calm, and Shyam tries to call someone; he finds his phone battery has run out; therefore, in a rage, he breaks his phone and throws it on the floor of the car. Later on, still trapped in the car, the broken phone receives a phone call; six surprised friends answer it, only to find the caller is God. God tells the six they should keep calm and just believe in themselves, and all will be well. They do as they are told and find that the london brigade has arrived to save them. They are all saved. Bakshi is fired by his American boss for his scrutiny. After the night shift is finished, Shyam and Priyanka rekindle their relationship. Years later, Shyam and Varun open their own website academy; Shyam proposes to Priyanka and marries her; Military Uncle pays for a visa and goes to America; Radhika lives a carefree life after divorcing Anuj; Esha quits her fashion modeling career and works as an NGO Labourer; and Priyanka studies to become a school teacher. After the story, Khan asks the woman who she is, and she replies, "If you believe in yourself, you will know the answer." She walks out of the lounge, and as Khan follows her, he seems to witness that she has suddenly disappeared. He believes in himself, his jet gets fixed, and he flies back home.

== Cast ==
- Sharman Joshi as Shyam Mehra (Sam)
- Sohail Khan as Varun Malhotra (Vroom/Victor)
- Arbaaz Khan as Anuj Jha
- Gul Panag as Priyanka Sinha (Pearl)
- Isha Koppikar as Esha Singh (Elizabeth)
- Amrita Arora as Radhika Jha (Rebecca)
- Sharat Saxena as Military uncle- Col. Arvind Tripathi
- Anusha Dandekar as Shefali Khandelwal
- Dalip Tahil as Subhash Bakshi
- Suresh Menon as System's guy- Lokesh Chandaramani (Loki)
- Salman Khan in a special appearance as himself
- Katrina Kaif in a special appearance as mysterious storyteller (Hindi voice dubbed as Mona Ghosh Shetty)

== Reception ==
It received mixed to negative reviews from critics, many citing the poorly sketched out characters as its biggest drawback, some praised its original concept.
