= Nanban (2012 film) =

2012 Indian film by Shankar

- Theatrical release poster
- Directed by: Shankar
- Screenplay by: Abhijat Joshi; Rajkumar Hirani
- Dialogues by: Shankar; Madhan Karky
- Based on: 3 Idiots by Rajkumar Hirani
- Produced by: Manohar Prasad; Ravi Shankar Prasad
- Starring: Vijay; Jiiva; Srikanth; Ileana D'Cruz; Sathyaraj; Sathyan
- Narrated by: Srikanth
- Cinematography: Manoj Paramahamsa
- Edited by: Anthony
- Music by: Harris Jayaraj
- Production company: Gemini Film Circuit
- Release date: 13 January 2012
- Running time: 188 minutes
- Country: India
- Language: Tamil
- Box office: ₹150 crore

Nanban (transl. Friend) is a 2012 Indian Tamil-language coming-of-age comedy drama film directed by Shankar and produced by Gemini Film Circuit. The film stars Vijay, Jiiva, Srikanth, Sathyaraj, Ileana D'Cruz, Sathyan and Anuya, with S. J. Suryah and Vijay Vasanth in cameo appearances. It is a remake of the Rajkumar Hirani's 2009 Hindi-language film 3 Idiots, which itself is based on Chetan Bhagat's novel Five Point Someone. The film follows Venkat, Senthil and Srivatsan, who are on the search for their long lost friend, Panchavan Parivendhan.

Gemini Film Circuit acquired the remake rights for 3 Idiots in January 2010. Several directors were approached to direct it, with Shankar finalised in that October. Vijay was signed to portray Aamir Khan's role in the film, however, he walked out due to schedule conflicts in December. After trying to get Suriya on board, which failed, Vijay was again brought on board. Casting process completed in February 2011, and principal photography commenced the same month. It was shot sporadically in several legs, before wrapping by late-October. Filming locations included Ooty, Dehradun, Pondicherry, Chennai, London and Buckingham. The film has music composed by Harris Jayaraj, cinematography handled by Manoj Paramahamsa and editing by Anthony Gonsalves.

Nanban released on 12 January 2012 worldwide in theatres to positive reviews from critics. The film was also screened at the Melbourne Film Festival. Indian Express reported the film grossed ₹1.50 billion at the box office.

== Plot ==
Wildlife photographer Venkat Ramakrishnan receives a call from his old college friend Srivatsan (Silencer), who claims to know the whereabouts of Venkat's long-lost college friend, Panchavan Pariventhan (Pari). Venkat and his another college friend, Sevarkodi Senthil, rush to meet Silencer, who reveals that Pari is in Ooty. They set off to find him.

In a flashback, Venkat is forced to study engineering by his father Ramakrishnan. Venkat befriends Senthil, whose family relies on him to escape poverty, and Pari, a carefree student passionate about engineering. Their college principal, Virumandi Santhanam (Virus), is strict and unsympathetic.

Paneerselvam Sivaprakasam (Paneer), another student like Pari who is also passionate about engineering, is denied graduation by Virus for missing a project submission deadline. Paneer explains to Virus that he had been delaying his submission of his project to focus on his dad's health. Pari, Venkat, and Senthil completes Paneer's project for Paneer but only for them to find out that Paneer committed suicide and died by hanging himself in his dormitory. Pari tries to change Virus's views on academic pressure and suicide but is rebuffed.

Virus sends letters to Venkat's and Senthil's families about their poor performance. The trio crashes Virus's daughter Shwetha's wedding for food and meets Ria, Virus's other daughter. Virus warns Venkat and Senthil that Pari is a bad influence. Senthil moves in with Silencer, who values rote learning. Pari and Venkat prank Silencer, leading to public humiliation and a bet on future success between Pari and Silencer.

Pari influences Ria to break up with her money minded fiancé Rakesh. Unfortunately Senthil's father has a heart attack, Pari and Ria helps save Senthil's father, leading Senthil to reconcile with Pari. Ria falls in love for Pari. The friends finish their examinations with Pari scoring the highest.

In the present, Venkat, Senthil, and Silencer reach Ooty and meet someone revealed to be the real Panchavan Pariventhan. Pari reveals that Venkat's and Senthil's college friend is actually Pappu, the son of the Pariventhan family's gardener, who assumed Pari's identity while the real Pari studied abroad. Pari tells Venkat and Senthil that Pappu is in Dhanushkodi and They head there.

During their final year of college, Pari and Ria begin a relationship. After a break-in at Virus's house, Virus threatens Senthil with expulsion unless he testifies against Pari. Unwilling to disappoint Senthil's family and Pari, Senthil attempts suicide but he is saved by Pari, Ria, and Venkat. Virus cancels Senthil's expulsion threat, and Senthil secures a job. Venkat convinces his father Ramakrishnan to let him pursue wildlife photography.

In the present, Venkat and Senthil bring Ria from her wedding in Madurai to find Pari. In the past, Virus decides to set a hard examination to fail Senthil and prevent Senthil from obtaining the job. Pari and Venkat steals the examination question papers without Virus's knowledge, but Senthil refuses to cheat and throws it away. Eventually, Virus notices that the examination question paper has been stolen from his office and he expels the trio from the college.

Following the trio's expulsion from the college, Ria, having given the office key to the trio, finally confronts her older sister, Shwetha, and her father by revealing that her brother, who was presumed to have died in a train accident, actually committed suicide due to the pressure his father had put him through into becoming an engineer, since he wanted to pursue his own dream by becoming a writer instead, but only to simply write a suicide note.

Later, Shwetha goes into labour during a flood and the roads to the hospital are inaccessible, but the trio successfully manage to help deliver Shwetha's child. As a result, Virus cancels the expulsion of the trio and he allows the trio to take their final examinations. After taking the final examinations, Pari disappears on the graduation day.

In Dhanushkodi, Venkat, Senthil, Ria, and Silencer reunite with Pari, now revealed as Kosaksi Pasapugazh, a successful entrepreneur. Silencer accepts defeat.

== Cast ==
- Vijay as impostor Panchavan Parivendhan (Pari) / Kosaksi Pasapugazh. He is a very intelligent student who knocked Silencer in exams, being the topper of the batch. He is always helpful. He fell in love with Ria. After graduation, he broke contact with all his friends. After a long search, his friends find him to be an entrepreneur who runs a school and is partially a teacher too.
- Jiiva as Sevarkodi Senthil: He is from a poor family with a mother as a retired teacher and a paralysed father. He was studying engineering to earn a good job and to get his sister Jaya married. Later he became a rich businessman after earning a job.
- Srikanth as Venkat Ramakrishnan: He is an amateur wildlife photographer. He loved photography but his father wanted him to become an engineer. Later, he became a good wildlife photographer and published several books on his photographs.
- Ileana D'Cruz as Ria Santhanam, Virus's younger daughter, a clever and smart doctor. She was in love with Pari. (Voice dubbed by Andrea Jeremiah)
- Sathyaraj as Virumandi Santhanam ('Virus'): Principal of the engineering college. He is very strict and disciplined. He initially hates Pari for questioning him against his rules and discipline, but warms up to him after he helps deliver Shwetha's son. Ria and Shwetha's father.
- Sathyan as Srivatsan alias Silencer: A topper student who was very well in all subjects. He was a little back in speaking Tamil. He too hated Pari but is shocked to find out that Pari is the very entrepreneur he is looking to sign a deal with for his company.
- Anuya as Swetha, Virumandi's first daughter, Ria's elder sister. (Voice dubbed by Deepa Venkat)
- T. M. Karthik as Rakesh ('Pricetag'): Ria's money minded ex-fiancé.
- Manobala as Librarian Bose
- Uma as Mrs. Ramakrishnan, Venkat's mother, a loving and caring parent.
- Chandra as Senthil's mother
- Aadukalam Naren as Ramakrishnan (nicknamed Hitler Ramakrishnan by Pari, Venkat and Senthil), Venkat's father, a strict but loving parent who wants his son to be happy.
- Sreeja Ravi as Doctor
- Sreedevi Gengiah as Jaya, Senthil's sister
- Indrans as Govindan, Virus's assistant
- Balaji Venugopal as "Semester" Purai, a senior college student at IEC responsible for leading the ragging there.
- Venkat Sundar as Ragging Senior
- Poo Ramu as Paneer Selvam's Father
- Rinson Simon as younger Manimaran, nicknamed "Millimetre": an adolescent, he earns a small living by doing errands for students, such as laundry, finishing assignments, and getting groceries. Pari persuades him to buy a school uniform and sneak into school to gain an education.
- Dheenadhayal as professor during the "What is a machine?" lecture
- Shankar Sundaram as Examiner
- Ramanathan as Interviewer
- Chelladurai as Sweater seller

=== Cameo appearances ===
- S. J. Suryah as the real Panchavan Parivendhan. It is from him that Senthil and Venkat learn the truth: Panchavan's father sponsored an orphaned servant boy called 'Pappu', who had demonstrated his intelligence and love of learning, to earn a degree in Panchavan's name, while he was in London. He appreciates what Pappu did for him, and tells Senthil and Venkat where to find him. His sister Nimi was in love with Venkat.
- Vijay Vasanth as Paneer Selvam, a student with a passion for machines. After Virus tells him that he will not graduate, he commits suicide.
- Vikas as older Manimaran, nicknamed "Centimetre": assistant to Pari/Kosaksi Pasapugazh in Dhanushkodi
- Shanmugasundaram as Education Minister, who appears in the speech scene, where he gets insulted by Silencer, along with Virus
- Ajay Rathnam as Panchavan and Nimi's father
- Pooja Ramachandran as Paaru: Senthil's (Jeeva) wife

Uncredited

- Venkatesh as Ambulance driver
- Rekhs (Subtitlist) as Srivatsan's mother
- S. Shankar as Director in "Asku Laska" song
- Atlee as assistant director in "Asku Laska" song
- Shobi in "Asku Laska" song

== Production ==
=== Pre-production ===
Following Gemini Film Circuit's purchase of the remake rights for 3 Idiots in January 2010, there was much speculation in regards to the three title roles played by Aamir Khan, R. Madhavan and Sharman Joshi in the original. Gemini Film Circuit approached noted directors Shankar, Vishnuvardhan and S. Dharani to replace Rajkumar Hirani as the director, with the approval from Shankar leading to him being signed. Despite speculation that he was set to pull out from directing his first remake as it would be a step down from his previous film, Enthiran, Shankar stated his commitment in October 2010. He later added that, "he came across 3 Idiots during the making of Endhiran, and it was that moment he decided to break his self-imposed rule – making only original movies – and decided to direct his first remake venture."

=== Development ===
"When I was shooting for Endhiran [..] I wanted to see an action film but I ended up watching a comedy. My mind was not on the film but I saw the audience continuously laughing. I got involved in the film and I felt so good at the end of it. It was a wonderful feeling and I thought our Tamil audience must also experience this. However, Nanban is not a literal translation of 3 idiots. The movie had to be fresh and yet retain its soul. I wanted to bring it as close as possible to the Tamil audience by making it earthy and simple".

— Shankar on directing Nanban.

Harris Jayaraj and Yuvan Shankar Raja were approached to compose the soundtrack, with Shankar settling for the former with whom he had worked in the 2005 film Anniyan earlier. (Note: Shankar and Harris Jayaraj had previously worked in Anniyan (2005).) Meanwhile, Manoj Paramahamsa, whose work in Vinnaithaandi Varuvaayaa and Eeram had been critically acclaimed, was signed on as the cinematographer. Sound designer Resul Pookutty and visual effects designer V. Srinivas Mohan joined the crew, following a successful collaboration in Enthiran.

=== Casting ===
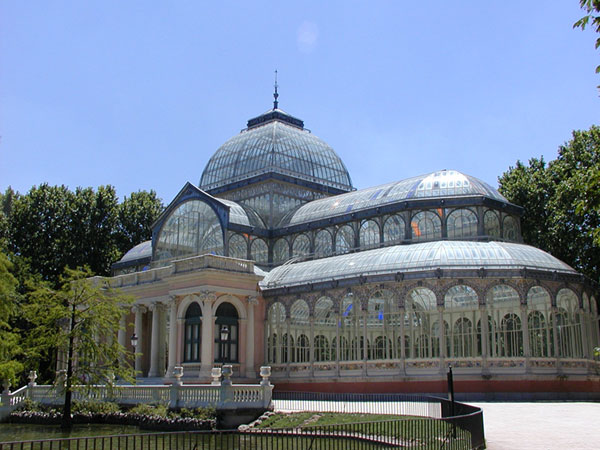
The Crystal Palace in Buen Retiro Park, another highlight in the song "Asku Laska"

For the lead role, played in 3 Idiots by Aamir Khan, initial reports suggested that Suriya, Mahesh Babu, and Ram Charan were front-runners. During the Telugu version's promotion, which Charan attended as chief guest, he said that he declined the role not knowing that Shankar would direct the film. A special screening for the film industry included Vijay, who expressed his desire to work in the film, and was subsequently signed up by Gemini Film Circuits to portray the lead role. However, by mid-December 2010, soon after trial shoots were held, Vijay walked out the film following disputes over his dates, with Suriya being labelled as his likely replacement. Reports claimed that talks with Suriya failed, since the actor had demanded salary increase and dubbing rights for the Telugu-version of the film. Suriya's reasons for refusing the offer was later confirmed not to be true, with Suriya himself revealing that he had opted out only because of other film commitments and "did not want to keep Shankar waiting". As a result, Vijay was once again finalised for the role.

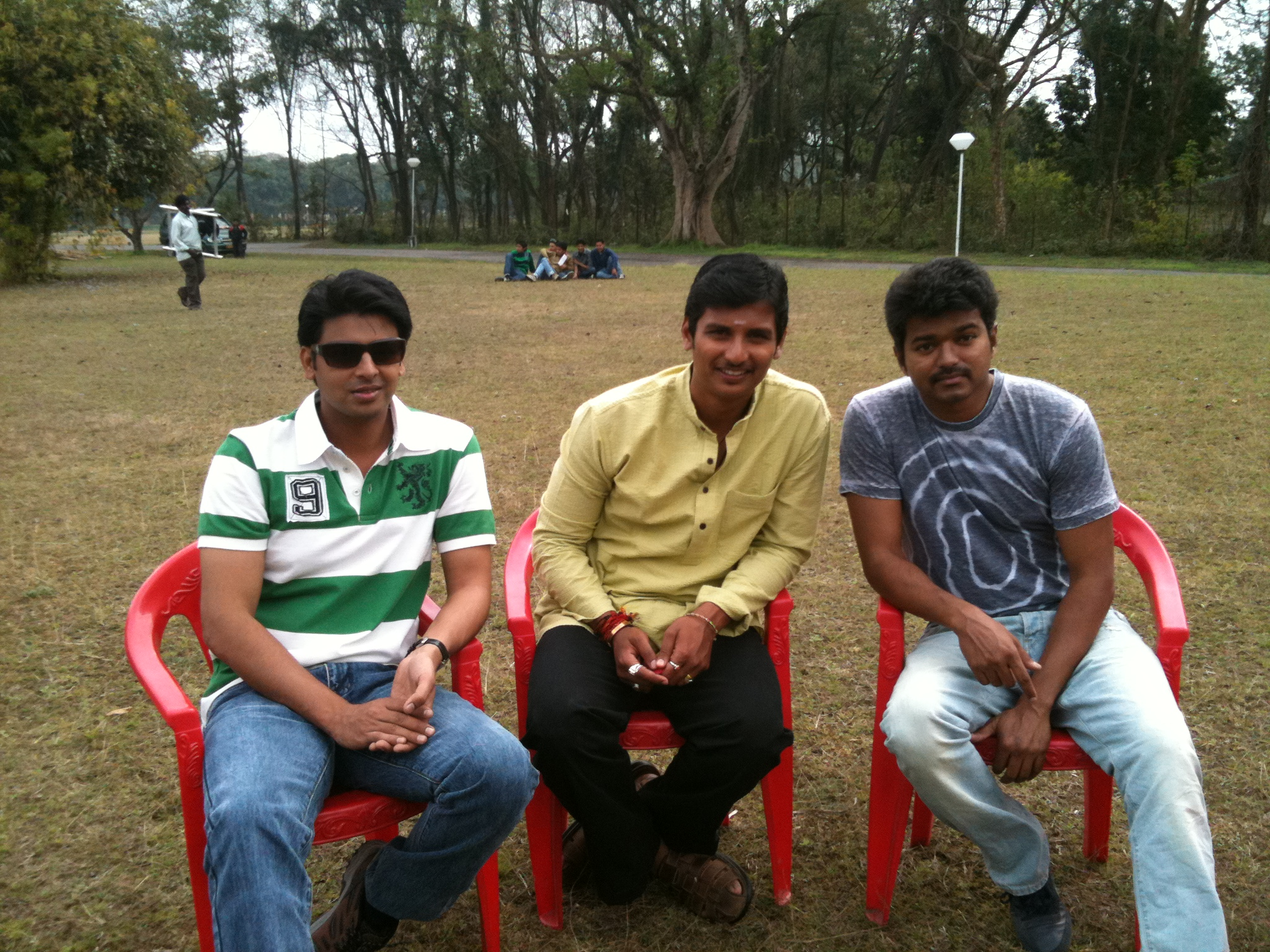
From the sets of this movie, (from left to right) Srikanth, Jiiva and Vijay

The roles of the other two title characters took considerably longer to confirm.

R. Madhavan was initially approached to reprise his role from the original but made it clear that he was unwilling to be a part of the remake, citing the film had already "gone down in history". Early indications suggested that Udhayanidhi Stalin had replaced him but the claims were false. In November 2010, reports emerged that Vinay Rai or Nakul were set to play the role, however Vinay cited that he refused the project as the role was not as meaty as the other two characters. Consequently, the production house signed Srikanth to play the role, after seeing his performance in Drohi, which had come after several box-office failures for him.

Sharman Joshi's role was originally offered to Silambarasan, but after discussions, it was revealed that Silambarasan could not do as he felt he didn't suit the character. Subsequently, the role was offered to Siddharth, a protégé of Shankar, who also went on to refuse the project. Despite further reports that Arya and Jiiva were being considered, the latter signed on and agreed with Shankar that he would play Joshi's role instead of Madhavan's.

The role played by Kareena Kapoor in the original was offered to Asin Thottumkal. However Ileana D'Cruz was signed on for the film after attempts to cast Katrina Kaif in the film had failed.

The role of the professor, played in 3 Idiots by Boman Irani, was given to Sathyaraj, despite early indications that Prakash Raj would be approached.

Omi Vaidya was unable to reprise his role from the original. Later, Shankar approached Dileep to play the role, but he too opted out and comedian Sathyan Sivakumar was signed on to essay his role after failed attempts to sign Sricharan of Payanam fame. S. J. Surya signed on to appear in a guest role, portraying the role enacted by Javed Jaffrey.

Anuya Bhagvath was signed up for a supporting role as Ileana D'Cruz's elder sister, played in the original by Mona Singh. Stage artist Sreedevi Gengiah was selected to play Jiiva's sister.

Raju Jeyamohan was initially chosen to play the older version of Rinson Simon's character Millimeter, but was later removed as his eyes did not match Rinson Simon's; the role went to Vikas.

=== Filming ===
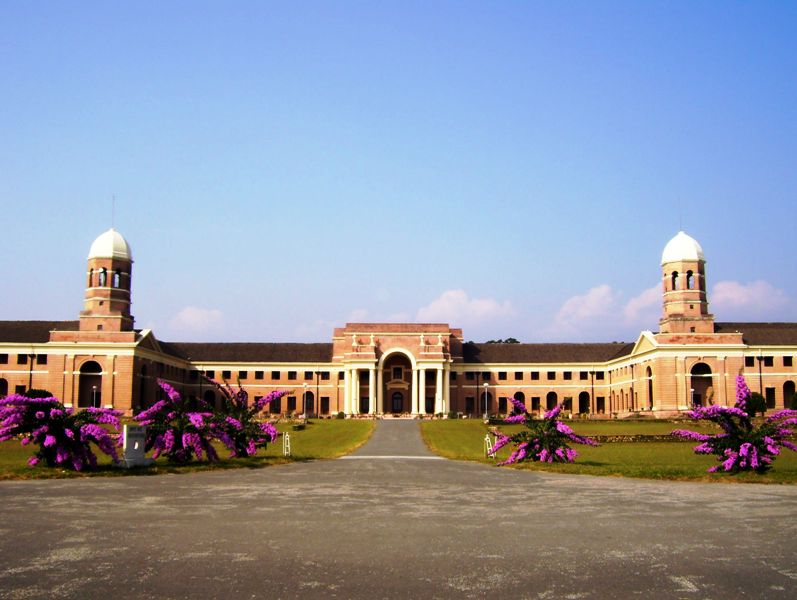
Most of the film was shot at Forest Research Institute, Dehradun.

The first schedule of filming was held in Ooty, where scenes involving Ileana, Srikanth and Jiiva were shot. During the second schedule scenes involving the lead cast were canned at Forest Research Institute, Dehradun and Pondicherry Engineering College and Stanley Medical College where the classroom scenes were shot, Pondicherry and a car chase at various places in Chennai, while two songs were filmed in London and Buckingham during the third schedule. Some significant parts of the film were shot in Chennai at Sun Studios, Kothandapani Studios and the Ampa Skywalk Mall, as well as Koyambedu water tank for three days, for which an Akila crane was used. Further filming, including the climax, was held at various locations in Europe, Andamans and Coimbatore. Filming wrapped in October with a song featuring Vijay and Ileana, which was choreographed by Farah Khan. Shankar wanted to paint a train for the song sequence, so the team decided to stick paper and then paste the painting on it. Art director Muthuraj hired some 250 artists from various states who were well versed in folk drawings and finished the entire job at breakneck speed and returned the train in time.

== Themes and influences ==
The film is a remake of Rajkumar Hirani's 3 Idiots (2009), which itself was adapted from the novel Five Point Someone – What not to do at IIT! by Chetan Bhagat. The film deals with the theme that one shouldn't run behind success and rather pursue his/her own interests. If one develops the right skill anything is possible. According to Gauthaman Bhaskaran of Hindustan Times, "Nanban's message is profound [..] given India's exploitative and unimaginative education system. The film lambasts bookishness, the mad chase for marks, [..] the joy of discovering. Parental and peer pressure and the frightfully huge fees for professional courses push boys and girls into performing puppets. The higher your grades, the closer you are to securing a centum, the brighter become your chances of making it in life".

The film shows characters having various interests. The character Pari is against the educational system and insists his classmates not to run behind grades rather derive pleasure by understanding and assimilating things while his principal Virumandi Sandhanam aka Virus (Sathyaraj) wants students to become a book worm to excel in academics. Venkat is interested in wildlife photography but his parents compel him to study engineering. Senthil hails from a poor family and is compelled to study a professional course only to bail out his family from all troubles.

The film also uses real inventions by little-known people in India's backyards. The brains behind the innovations were Remya Jose, a student from Kerala, who created the exercise-bicycle/washing-machine; Mohammad Idris, a barber from Meerut district in Uttar Pradesh, who invented a bicycle-powered horse clipper; and Jahangir Painter, a painter from Maharashtra, who made the scooter-powered flour mill which was featured in the original Hindi film.

== Music ==
The soundtrack and background score was composed by Harris Jayaraj, collaborating with Shankar for the second time after Anniyan (2005). This film also marks Vijay's second collaboration with Harris Jayaraj, after the 2000 Coca-Cola TVC. The album features six tracks, with lyrics being provided by Pa. Vijay, Viveka, Na. Muthukumar and Madhan Karky, the latter two penning lyrics for two songs each. Notably, Karky's lyrics in "Asku Laska" include more than 16 different languages. The full soundtrack album was released on 23 December 2011.

== Release ==
=== Theatrical ===
Prior to the release, Nanban was voted the "most expected film" of 2012 through an online public poll conducted by Vikatan. The film was released on 12 January 2012 for Pongal in 925 screens worldwide.

Nanban advance booking opened well in Chennai city and suburbs. It had the highest number of 77 shows in a single day at Mayajaal multiplex in Chennai at that time. The film opened in nearly 625 screens in Tamil Nadu. It was released in 50 screens in Chennai and 31 screens in Hyderabad. It released simultaneously in UK, the US, Malaysia and Singapore. Nanban became the first Tamil film to be released with French subtitles in France. It also became the first film to get exempted from the 30 per cent entertainment tax in Tamil Nadu by the new scheme introduced by the Government of Tamil Nadu.

=== Distribution ===
Telugu film distributor Dil Raju bought the theatrical rights of Snehitudu, the Telugu dubbed version of Nanban for Andhra Pradesh market. Snehitudu was released on 26 January 2012.

=== Home media ===
The film had its television premiere on Star Vijay on 1 May 2012, four months after its theatrical release and registered a TRP of 11.1 points.

== Reception ==
=== Critical response ===
Nanban received positive reviews from critics. On the review aggregator website Rotten Tomatoes, 95% of 49 critics' reviews are positive, with an average rating of 7.8/10.

Sify called it an "engaging film with noble intentions. It deserves viewing because films like this are hard to find". Pavithra Srinivasan from Rediff.com gave the film 3/5 stars, describing it as "the perfect feel-good fare for the festive season, despite minor glitches". Malathi Rangarajan from The Hindu wrote: "Nanban is an enjoyable cocktail of humour with some sentiment and sadness thrown in for that extra appeal. Once again Shankar proves the master craftsman that he is". Anupama Subramanian from Deccan Chronicle gave the film 3/5 stars, while labelling it as a "feel-good film with a larger message and a brilliant feat by Vijay which makes the film a not-to-be-missed one!" Venkateswaran Narayanan from Times of India noted several anachronisms in the film (such as YouTube being used in 2002 when it was actually launched in 2005) but wrote: "Such minor cribbing apart, all is well with Nanban because Shankar's retelling of 3 Idiots retains its soul and has its heart in the right place". Zee News wrote: "Nanban is a must watch, grab your tickets now. It's the best gift Vijay could have given to his diehard fans this Pongal". CNN-IBN said that it was "sweet and satisfying". Ananda Vikatan rated the film 44 out of 100. Acclaimed actor Kamal Haasan appreciated Vijay's performance in the movie and lauded the team's effort in making such a good entertainer. Jeevi from Idlebrain.com with regards to the Telugu dubbed version Snehithudu commented that "the magic of 3 idiots is missing", and gave 3/5 stars.

=== Box office ===
==== India ====
In Chennai city, the film netted ₹22.7 million (US$240,000) in its first weekend and 64% of the takings, and ₹49.5 million (US$510,000) at the end of the first week, staying at first rank. The film accounted for 66% of the takings at the Chennai box office on its second weekend and 64% on its third weekend. The film grossed around ₹78.9 million (US$820,000) in Chennai after seven weeks, out of which about ₹10 million (US$100,000) came from Sathyam Cinemas multiplex. In Coimbatore and Nilgiris area, Nanban opened in 70 screens and netted ₹52 million (US$540,000) in the first week. It also got a great opening at the Bangalore box-office, where it was still featured in Top 5 even one month after its release. The film's gross collection after its first week from 4 circuits of Coimbatore was around ₹55 million (US$570,000), the highest yield since Endhiran.

==== Overseas ====
Nanban was released in 7 screens in Australia and grossed $76,580 in its first weekend. Overall it had grossed $110,422. In UK, it collected $173,789 in its first week with a per screen average of $7,241 in 24 theatres. After its 4-week run the film collected £214,735 (₹16.6 million) and became the 4th highest grosser in UK. It also secured the first place in the Malaysian box-office in the first week released in 37 screens, and collected a total of $871,959 after a six-week run. It collected a sum of ₹5.8 million (US$60,000) after 18 days at the Australian box office, whereas it had collected ₹38.2 million (US$400,000) at the Malaysian box office within the same period.

=== Accolades ===
Ananda Vikatan Awards
Year	Category	Nominee	Result
2012	Best Actor	Vijay (Shared With Thuppakki)	Won
Big Tamil Melody Awards
Year	Category	Nominee	Result
2012	Best Music Director	Harris Jayaraj	Won
Vijay Awards
Year	Category	Nominee	Result
2012	Entertainer of the Year	Vijay	Won
2012	Favourite Film	Nanban	Nominated
2012	Best Supporting Actor	Sathyaraj	Won
2012	Best Comedian	Sathyan	Nominated
2012	Best Music Director	Harris Jayaraj	Nominated
2012	Best Art Director	Muthuraj	Nominated
2012	Best Choreographer	Farah Khan	Nominated
