= Kai Po Che! =

2013 Indian film directed by Abhishek Kapoor

- Theatrical release poster
- Directed by: Abhishek Kapoor
- Written by: Pubali Chaudhari; Supratik Sen; Abhishek Kapoor; Chetan Bhagat
- Based on: The 3 Mistakes of My Life by Chetan Bhagat
- Produced by: Ronnie Screwvala; Siddharth Roy Kapur
- Starring: Sushant Singh Rajput; Amit Sadh; Rajkummar Rao; Amrita Puri; Asif Basra
- Cinematography: Anay Goswamy
- Edited by: Deepa Bhatia
- Music by: Original Songs: Amit Trivedi; Background Score: Hitesh Sonik
- Production company: UTV Motion Pictures
- Distributed by: UTV Motion Pictures
- Release date: 22 February 2013
- Running time: 126 minutes
- Country: India
- Language: Hindi
- Budget: ₹30 crore
- Box office: est. ₹83 crore

Kai Po Che!: Brothers... For Life (transl. I have cut the kite) is a 2013 Indian Hindi-language sports drama film directed by Abhishek Kapoor and produced by Ronnie Screwvala and Siddharth Roy Kapur under UTV Motion Pictures, marking the banner's first solo production under the Disney·UTV brand. Adapted from Chetan Bhagat's 2008 novel The 3 Mistakes of My Life, with a three-song soundtrack by Amit Trivedi and lyrics by Swanand Kirkire, the film stars Rajkummar Rao, Amit Sadh, and newcomer Sushant Singh Rajput as the three main protagonists while Amrita Puri plays the female lead. The title is originally a Gujarati phrase that means "I have cut" which refers to Makar Sankranti (known as Uttarayan in Gujarat) where one of the competitors uses his kite to cut off another competitor's kite and yells the phrase.

Set in Ahmedabad from 2000 to 2012, Kai Po Che! revolves around three friends, Ishaan "Ish" Bhatt (Rajput), Omkar "Omi" Shastri (Sadh) and Govind "Govi" Patel (Rao), who want to start their own sports shop and sports academy; the story also references the 2001 Gujarat earthquake, the 2002 Godhra train burning and the 2002 Gujarat Riots, and tracks their deep friendship, and innocence tarnished by religious politics and communal hatred. The film had its world premiere at the 63rd Berlin International Film Festival on 13 February 2013 where it was the first ever Indian film to feature in the World Panorama section.

Made on a budget of ₹300 million (US$3.2 million), Kai Po Che! was released worldwide on 22 February 2013 and met with acclaim from Indian reviewers, with praise for the direction of Kapoor and the performances of Rajput, Rao, and Sadh, but mixed reviews internationally. The film grossed ₹830 million (US$8.9 million) worldwide, becoming a critical as well as commercial success. The film received five nominations at the 59th Filmfare Awards, including Best Director for Kapoor, Best Supporting Actor for Rao, and Best Story. The film won two awards, including Best Screenplay for Kapoor and Best Background Score for Hitesh Sonik.

== Plot ==
Sometime in 2010, Govind "Govi" Patel is giving a presentation at a school about the services provided by Sabarmati Sports Club, an enterprise owned by him. Omkar "Omi" Shastri, in a parallel scene, is released from prison and Govi picks him up. While halting at a restaurant mid-way, Govi and Omi reminisce about their lives ten years ago, and remember their good friend Ishaan "Ish" Bhatt.

=== Ten years ago ===
Ish is an ex-district level cricketer, who became a victim of selection politics. Omi is the nephew of a Hindu politician, Bittu Joshi, who funds his father's temple, and Govi has a penchant for business and numbers. Together, they open up a sports shop cum cricket training academy.

Ish asks Govi to tutor his younger sister, Vidya, in mathematics, for her upcoming exams. Vidya and Govi gradually develop feelings for each other and begin a romantic relationship. Upon learning this, Omi warns Govi of the consequences, as Ish is very protective of his sister.

The three friends spot a rare budding cricket talent, Ali Hashmi, and Ish starts training him vigorously despite political tension between Ali's father Naseer Hashmi and Bittu, who lead rival parties. Govi wants to expand the budding business by opening another shop in a mall. With a huge financial assistance from Bittu, the trio successfully set up their shop in the mall, but on 26 January 2001, a destructive earthquake hits Gujarat and the mall is destroyed. Omi is forced to work for Bittu's right-wing party, and is unable to return to the shop.

While Naseer is away, Ish leads Ali and the Muslim neighbourhood to the relief camps set up by Bittu's party. When they are turned away, Ish and Omi fight, creating a temporary rift in their friendship. They reunite after India's surprise win in the test match against Australia on 15 March 2001. Bittu loses the elections in his constituency to his opponent Subodh Mehta, who is supported by Naseer. In response, Bittu sends pilgrims (kar sevaks) to the Ram Temple in Ayodhya, including Omi's parents. On 27 February 2002, they learn that the train coach carrying the pilgrims was burned, resulting in the deaths of 59 people. Omi is devastated, and Bittu encourages him to avenge his parents.

Ish attempts to lead Ali away to protect him from the imminent communal riots, accompanied by Govi. The mob led by Bittu storms into the Muslim locality, killing every Muslim in sight. A fight ensues between Naseer and Bittu in which Naseer stabs Bittu. Omi, enraged at Bittu's death, pursues Naseer with a pistol. Meanwhile, Ish learns of Vidya and Govi's relationship, and begins furiously thrashing Govi. Omi arrives, desperately searching for Ali and Naseer. Ish and Govi hurriedly try to stop Omi. He finally points and shoots at Ali and Naseer, but Ish is struck by the bullet instead, while trying to shield them, resulting in his death on the spot.

=== Present day ===
Omi is released from prison. Govi and Vidya are married and have a son, whom they have named Ishaan in memory of his friend and her brother. Vidya forgives Omi when he breaks down in front of her. The film ends with a now grown-up Ali debuting for the Indian cricket team against Australia. He plays his first shot by hitting the ball to the boundary with a cover drive, just like Ish had taught him. Ish's spirit smiles at Ali's achievement and fades away.

== Cast ==
- Sushant Singh Rajput as Ishaan "Ish" Bhatt
- Amit Sadh as Omkar “Omi” Shastri
- Rajkummar Rao as Govind "Govi" Patel
- Amrita Puri as Vidya Bhatt, Ishaan's sister
- Digvijay Deshmukh as Ali Hashmi
  - Tahir Raj Bhasin as an adult Ali Hashmi
- Asif Basra as Naseer Hashmi, Ali's father
- Manav Kaul as Bittu Joshi, Omi's uncle
- Ishaan Bhagat as Ishaan Patel in a special appearance
- Ashish Kakkad as Vishwas
- Ajay Jadeja in a cameo appearance as a cricket commentator
- Gaurav Kapur in a cameo appearance as a cricket commentator
- Navneet Sharma as Library guy
- Raminder Sandhu as Poor guy
- Gargi Patel as Kendriya Vidyalaya Principal

== Production ==
=== Filming ===
Filming began in Vadnagar in Mehsana district of Gujarat along majority of scenes canned in old Ahmedabad and continued further in Porbandar, Diu. A scene featuring the trio was shot at Hatkeshwar Mahadev temple. One of the songs Meethi Boliyan was exclusively shot around Daman and Diu. Reportedly, Sushant Singh Rajput had to undergo four months cricket training under two coaches to fit into the book adapted character of 'Ishaan'. A cricket match sequence was shot at the Sabarmati Railway stadium sabarmati in Ahmedabad. The Board of Control for Cricket in India (BCCI) has granted the director permission to use footage from a historic India–Australia Kolkata test match from 2001 in Kai Po Che!. Director Abhishek Kapoor has admitted that the leading Bollywood stars didn't want to be a part of the film. Former cricketer Ajay Jadeja was signed for a special appearance in this film.

=== Title ===
Chetan Bhagat, whose book is adapted for the screen, first revealed the title of the film. Subsequently, a short contest was announced by him on Twitter to create awareness about the film and its title.

== Soundtrack ==
Kai Po Che!

Soundtrack album by Amit Trivedi
- Released: 23 January 2013
- Recorded: 2012–2013
- Genre: Feature film soundtrack
- Length: 12:21
- Language: Hindi
- Label: Sony Music India
- Producers: Ronnie Screwvala; Siddharth Roy Kapur; Amit Trivedi

Amit Trivedi chronology
Luv Shuv Tey Chicken Khurana (2012)	Kai Po Che! (2013)	Bombay Talkies (2013)

The music of the film was composed by Amit Trivedi while the lyrics were penned by Swanand Kirkire. The background music has been composed by Hitesh Sonik.

Track listing
No.	Title	Singer(s)	Length
1.	"Manjha"	Amit Trivedi, Mohan Kannan	3:37
2.	"Shubhaarambh"	Shruti Pathak, Divya Kumar	3:54
3.	"Meethi Boliyaan"	Amit Trivedi, Mili Nair	4:50
Total length:			12:21

== Release ==
Kai Po Che! release date was confirmed as 22 February 2013. The film was released on 1000 screens in India. Kai Po Che! received 'U' certificate from the Censor Board prior to its release without any cuts, and released on 22 February 2013.

=== Marketing ===
The first trailer of this movie was released on YouTube on 20 December 2012, and was premiered along with Dabangg 2. The 3 Mistakes of My Life book cover was relaunched with the poster of Kai Po Che!

The director had a four-city promotional strategy. There were plans of bonding with friends in four cities and hanging out with them. Sushant Singh Rajput was to host a private screening of Kai Po Che! in his hometown of Patna for his childhood friends. On 18 February 2013, a star-studded premiere was organised in Cinemax, Versova, Mumbai.

Actors like Aamir Khan, Hrithik Roshan, Huma Qureshi, Arshad Warsi and film-maker Shekhar Kapur praised the film and acting performances.

== Reception ==
=== Critical reception ===
The film was critically acclaimed by Indian critics but was met with a rather mixed reception from critics overseas.

==== India ====
Sukanya Verma for Rediff.com gave 4/5 stars and says Abhishek Kapoor's clarity of vision makes Kai Po Che!, the adaptation of a mediocre novel, so irresistible. Taran Adarsh of Bollywood Hungama gave it 4 out of 5 and stated that the film is brimming with solid content. Meena Iyer of The Times of India gave it 4 out of 5 stars saying, "Kai Po Che! is very likeable. Between tears, you find yourself smiling, because it's the story of friendship and human triumph above all else." Resham Sengar of Zee News gave 4/5 stars stating, "The magic of the film lies in its details!" Saibal Chatterjee of NDTV gave 3.5 stars saying, "Kai Po Che! is a competently crafted, well acted and consistently engaging drama that makes its point without sinking into preachy paroxysms". Shubhra Gupta of The Indian Express gave 3.5/5 stars adding, "Abhishek Kapoor uses Kai Po Che! as an apt metaphor and crafts a lovely, emotional film on abiding friendship and the values that make life worth living." India Today gave 3.5 stars.

Khalid Mohamed of Deccan Chronicle gave 3 out of 5 stars and stated that it is a good film. Deccan Herald stated that it is a warm film while Live Mint said that Kai Po Che! is a well-crafted entertainer. Anupama Chopra of Hindustan Times gave the movie 4 out of 5 stars saying that "Kai Po Che! is Gujarati for "I've cut". It is used as a cry of victory in kite-flying contests. Here victory is hard-earned and tinged with tears and regret. But it's also deeply satisfying." Rajeev Masand of IBN Live gave the movie 4/5 stars saying that "It's only February, but one of the year's best films has arrived". The Hindu stated that the film is breathless.

==== Overseas ====
The film is rated 78% 'fresh' on the review site Rotten Tomatoes. Critic Aaron Hillis of The Village Voice gave a negative review, stating that "The dramatic stakes are so puny that every obstacle can be overcome with a simple work-it-out montage, a cheap device prevalent enough in this movie to start a drinking game." Rachel Saltz of The New York Times wrote that the film "Mixes, not quite successfully, traditional Bollywood storytelling with something less conventional." Kate Taylor of The Globe and Mail wrote that the film "might be the next Bend It Like Beckham – if it did not have the sensibilities of the next Dr. Zhivago." Bruce Demara of the Toronto Star gave the a positive review of film 3.5 out of 4 stars. Through starting by criticizing the lengthy amount of Cricket portrayed in the film (which he describes as "a game that remains mystifying to North American audiences"), this aspect does not prevent Bruce from giving a Kai Po Che! a favorable review. He first praises the acting as what "makes film succeed – and occasionally soar", further describing it as "finely etched performances" with a "very fine cast". He further compliments the cinematography, stating that it shows "an India of contrasts, both sun-baked rural landscapes and chaotic urban scenes." He also states that the cinematography had "fine attention to detail" that provides the film "an air of authenticity". He then states that despite the film being 2-hour, the audience is "soon engaged and deeply invested in" it. He concludes his review by stating that even audiences with little knowledge of recent Indian history or the complexities of cricket "are going to find Kai Po Che a poignant and satisfying experience."

Robert Abele of the Los Angeles Times gave it a positive review, criticizing the film for its grimness and lack of subtlety, but complimenting the performances as "enjoyably boisterous", as well as complimenting the director Abhishek Kapoor for refusing to "linger on clichés for too long". Deborah Young of The Hollywood Reporter complimented the film for leaving the traditional Bollywood formula, by "boldly plunge[ing] into two major historical events: the 2001 earthquake that killed 18,000 people and... the violent Hindu-Muslim clashes of 2002." She also states that the Hindu-Muslim riot scene and subsequent reconciliation transforms the film into a "powerful drama" that "allows audiences to leave the theater with a tear in the eye". She later compliments the actors as "well cast" and praises the film's cinematography. Priya Joshi of the Digital Spy gave the film 4 out of 5 stars, describing the film as an "intimate story of friendship, ambition, love, loss and redemption. She further praises the film's storytelling, scripting, and cinematography as "cornerstones to this film", while complimenting the acting and characterization. She also praised the film's storyline, describing the tension of the rising action as a "shattering crescendo" by the climax. Her concluding message further commends the film: stating "thought-provoking, moving and ultimately heart-warming, Kai Po Che! is what great cinema is made of".

Russell Edwards of Special Broadcasting Service gave the film 3.5 out of 4 stars, introducing the film as "a hallmark of a well-made film is the way it can make you care about things you really care little about." He compliments the film for interlacing the film's narrative threads with real events, and concludes by stating the acting as "strong throughout". Daniel Eagan of the Film Journal International complimented the film, praising its authenticity by mentioning that it had moved "beyond Bollywood stereotypes to a new style of Indian cinema", further stating that the film "could attract an audience outside India". He praised the use of real situations mixed with the film's narrative, particularly complimenting the film's focusing on the character development during the events rather than overuse of special effects. He appreciated the film's use of "universal themes", and praised the way India was portrayed; describing this narrative on India as "on brink of the future, and yet still divided by wealth and poverty, by class and religion". He likewise admired the acting of the film, stating that all of the main characters "give strong performances". He completes his review by stating "this is a film whose scope, detail and appealing characters deserve a wide audience."

=== Box office ===
Kai Po Che! opened with a collection of ₹42.5 million (US$450,000) on day one with limited release where it did good business in metro cities especially. After the opening day, the film showed very good growth, grossing ₹62.5 million (US$670,000) and ₹75 million (US$800,000) on its second and third days respectively to make a collection of around ₹183 million (US$2.0 million) in its first weekend. It grossed ₹295 million (US$3.2 million) after its first week. The film held well despite some new releases and collected around ₹82.5 million (US$880,000) in its second weekend. It grossed ₹110 million (US$1.2 million) in second and ₹48.3 million (US$520,000) in its third week. The final domestic collections of the film are ₹480 million (US$5.1 million).

After its successful run in domestic market, the film has done well overseas with a business of around $2.25 million in 17 days. Final overseas collection was US$2.325 million.

== Accolades ==
Award (Note: Awards, festivals and organizations are in alphabetical order.)	Date of ceremony (Note: Date is linked to the article about the awards held that year, wherever possible.)	Category	Recipient(s)	Result	Ref.
BIG Star Entertainment Awards	18 December 2013	Most Entertaining Social – Drama Film	Kai Po Che!	Nominated	
BIG Star Entertainment Awards	18 December 2013	Most Entertaining Actor Debut – Male	Sushant Singh Rajput	Nominated	
Filmfare Awards	24 January 2014	Best Director	Abhishek Kapoor	Nominated	
Filmfare Awards	24 January 2014	Best Screenplay	Abhishek Kapoor, Chetan Bhagat; Pubali Chaudhari, Supratik Sen	Won	
Filmfare Awards	24 January 2014	Best Cinematography	Anay Goswamy	Nominated	
Filmfare Awards	24 January 2014	Best Costume Design	Niharika Khan	Nominated	
Filmfare Awards	24 January 2014	Best Supporting Actor	Rajkummar Rao	Nominated	
Filmfare Awards	24 January 2014	Best Lyricist	Swanand Kirkire – (for "Manja")	Nominated	
Filmfare Awards	24 January 2014	Best Male Playback Singer	Amit Trivedi – (for "Manja")	Nominated	
Filmfare Awards	24 January 2014	Best Background Score	Hitesh Sonik	Won	
Filmfare Awards	24 January 2014	Best Editing	Deepa Bhatia	Nominated	
Filmfare Awards	24 January 2014	Best Special Effects	Prime Focus	Nominated	
Global Indian Music Academy Awards	20 January 2014	Best Lyricist	Swanand Kirkire – (for "Manja")	Won	
Global Indian Music Academy Awards	20 January 2014	Best Music Debut	Mili Nair – (for "Meethi Boliyaan")	Nominated	
Global Indian Music Academy Awards	20 January 2014	Best Duet	Amit Trivedi, Mili Nair – (for "Meethi Boliyaan")	Nominated	
International Indian Film Academy Awards	23–26 April 2014	Best Film	Kai Po Che!	Nominated	
International Indian Film Academy Awards	23–26 April 2014	Best Director	Abhishek Kapoor	Nominated	
International Indian Film Academy Awards	23–26 April 2014	Best Story	Abhishek Kapoor, Chetan Bhagat; Pubali Chaudhari, Supratik Sen	Nominated	
International Indian Film Academy Awards	23–26 April 2014	Best Actor	Sushant Singh Rajput	Nominated	
Producers Guild Film Awards	16 January 2014	Best Director	Abhishek Kapoor	Nominated	
Producers Guild Film Awards	16 January 2014	Best Story	Abhishek Kapoor, Chetan Bhagat; Pubali Chaudhari, Supratik Sen	Nominated	
Producers Guild Film Awards	16 January 2014	Best Screenplay	Abhishek Kapoor, Chetan Bhagat; Pubali Chaudhari, Supratik Sen	Nominated	
Producers Guild Film Awards	16 January 2014	Best Actor in a Leading Role	Sushant Singh Rajput	Nominated	
Producers Guild Film Awards	16 January 2014	Best Male Debut	Sushant Singh Rajput	Won	
Producers Guild Film Awards	16 January 2014	Best Lyricist	Swanand Kirkire – (for "Manja")	Nominated	
Producers Guild Film Awards	16 January 2014	Best Male Playback Singer	Amit Trivedi – (for "Manja")	Nominated	
Screen Awards	14 January 2014	Best Film	Kai Po Che!	Nominated	
Screen Awards	14 January 2014	Best Ensemble Cast	Kai Po Che!	Nominated	
Screen Awards	14 January 2014	Best Director	Abhishek Kapoor	Nominated	
Screen Awards	14 January 2014	Best Screenplay	Abhishek Kapoor, Chetan Bhagat; Pubali Chaudhari, Supratik Sen	Nominated	
Screen Awards	14 January 2014	Most Promising Newcomer – Male	Sushant Singh Rajput	Won	
Screen Awards	14 January 2014	Best Supporting Actor	Amit Sadh	Nominated	
Screen Awards	14 January 2014	Best Music Director	Amit Trivedi	Nominated	
Screen Awards	14 January 2014	Best Background Score	Hitesh Sonik	Nominated	
Screen Awards	14 January 2014	Best Lyricist	Swanand Kirkire – (for "Manja")	Won	
Screen Awards	14 January 2014	Best Male Playback Singer	Amit Trivedi – (for "Manja")	Nominated	
Screen Awards	14 January 2014	Best Editing	Deepa Bhatia	Won	
Screen Awards	14 January 2014	Best Production Design	Sonal Sawant	Nominated	
Screen Awards	14 January 2014	Best Sound Design	Babylon Fonseca	Nominated	
Zee Cine Awards	8 February 2014	Best Male Debut	Sushant Singh Rajput	Nominated	
Zee Cine Awards	8 February 2014	Best Actor in a Supporting Role – Male	Rajkummar Rao	Won	
Zee Cine Awards	8 February 2014	Best Lyricist	Swanand Kirkire – (for "Manja")	Nominated	
Zee Cine Awards	8 February 2014	Best Story	Chetan Bhagat	Won	
Zee Cine Awards	8 February 2014	Best Cinematography	Anay Goswamy	Nominated	
Zee Cine Awards	8 February 2014	Best Production Design	Sonal Sawant	Nominated	
