= Five Point Someone =

2004 novel by Chetan Bhagat

Five Point Someone: What not to do at IIT
- First edition
- Author: Chetan Bhagat
- Genre: Fiction, Buddy
- Publisher: Rupa & Co.
- Publication date: 1 May 2004
- Publication place: India
- Media type: Paperback
- Pages: 270
- ISBN: 81-291-0459-8

Five Point Someone: What not to do at IIT is a 2004 novel written by Indian author Chetan Bhagat. The book has sold over a million copies worldwide. It was adapted into two films, 3 Idiots and Nanban, as well as a play by the theatre company Evam.

== Plot ==
The book is narrated by Hari, with some small passages by his friends Ryan and Alok, as well as a letter by Hari's girlfriend Neha Cherian. The three friends' elation on making it to one of the best engineering colleges in India is quickly deflated by the rigor and monotony of the academic work. The two main plot lines are: the numerous attempts by the trio to cope with and/or beat the system, and Hari's fling with Neha, the daughter of Prof. Cherian (the domineering head of the Mechanical Engineering department of their college). It occasionally takes some dark turns, especially as it pertains to the families of the protagonists. Most of the action, however, takes place inside the campus. The characters, led by the ever-creative Ryan, frequently lament over how the internationally lauded IIT system has stifled their creativity by forcing them to value grades more than anything else. Uninspiring teaching and numerous assignments add to their woes, though the boys do find a sympathizer in Prof Veera.

== Translation ==
The book has been translated into Hindi and was published by Prabhat Prakash Advaniji, who has released two novels: Five Point Someone and One Night at the Call Centre. The former set a record by being purchased by 30,000 people in one month and has gone on to become a top seller in Hindi.

== Reception ==
Amit Mishra, writer for The Last Critic, thought the book was "bereaved of all the literary juice", but "unlike his other publications like Half Girlfriend and One Indian Girl, this novel is almost flawless."

== Film adaptations ==
This book was made into two films, 3 Idiots in Hindi and Nanban in Tamil. The names of the characters and their attributes were changed. Also, both the films were not full adaptations of the books, as many of the scenes from the book, including the climax, were changed in the films.

- Ryan Oberoi: Ranchoddas Shamaldas Chanchad (Rancho) aka Phunsukh Wangdu (played by Aamir Khan (Hindi))/Panchavan Parivendan (Pari) aka Kosaksi Pasupugazh (played by Vijay (Tamil)), – A young, energetic and supposedly wealthy college-going student who is passionate about engineering. Though Rancho wants to be an engineer, he leans more towards inventing rather than seeking a job in an MNC, unlike his other college mates. According to him, one's profession should be something he/she loves doing, irrespective of how much it pays. He also keeps stating throughout the film that one should run after excellence, not after success. Rancho also believes in the concept of "All Is Well", in which people should focus on the present and live it as it is, instead of worrying over the future. There are many significant differences between the Ryan and Rancho characters, both in their background and attitudes.
- Hari Kumar: Farhan Qureshi (played by Madhavan (Hindi))/Venkat Ramakrishnan (played by Srikanth (Tamil)) – The narrator of the story, a young college-going student who loves wildlife photography, but is being forced by his parents to become an engineer. Hari's background (as acknowledged in one chapter of the book) was not elaborated upon. However, Hari seemed to be auto-biographical and the "Krish" character in Chetan Bhagat's 2 States (who apparently continues on from the Hari character) would provide greater details about Hari's background.
- Alok Gupta: Raju Rastogi (played by Sharman Joshi (Hindi))/Sevarkodi Senthil (played by Jiiva (Tamil)) – A young and insecure college-going student who isn't confident enough to deal with problems in life all by himself and always relies on God. Raju's only mission in life is to pull his family out of poverty, improve their economic status and get his elder sister married. This character is very similar to the one in the book.
- Prof. Cherian: Viru Sahastrabuddhe (Virus) (played by Boman Irani (Hindi))/Virumaandi Santhanam (played by Sathyaraj (Tamil)) – A hugely competitive, efficient, strict, and disciplined man who has been running the Imperial College of Engineering (Ideal Engineering College in Tamil) for the last three decades. He believes that life is a race, the ones who are not efficient about work and time get crushed. He sneers at Rancho's concept of studying for knowledge rather than marks and constantly spars with him and his friends due to this. He is known as "Virus" among the students. Virus has a greater role at the college when compared to Prof. Cherian.
- Neha Cherian: Pia Sahastrabuddhe (played by Kareena Kapoor (Hindi))/Ria Santhanam (played by Ileana D'Cruz (Tamil)) – A young, beautiful, eccentric doctor, daughter of Viru Sahastrabuddhe and Rancho's love interest. This character is a complete departure from the book because, in the book, she was Hari's girlfriend. Also while Pia and Rancho finally end up together, Neha and Hari maintain a long-distance relationship despite Hari's job in Mumbai and Neha in Delhi.
- Venkat: Chatur Ramalingam (played by Omi Vaidya in Hindi)/Srivatsan (played by Sathyan in Tamil) – A competitive and studious South Indian college student (NRI student in Tamil) who believes rote learning is the only way to excellence and also believes that there is no time for creativity and innovation in the turbulent and competitive race of life. Venkat has a small role in the book, while Chatur is one of the major characters in the movie.

Following the success of 3 Idiots in East Asian markets such as China and Hong Kong, the producer Vidhu Vinod Chopra has announced that Hong Kong film star Stephen Chow (known for comedy films such as Shaolin Soccer and Kung Fu Hustle) will be producing a Chinese remake of the film. Chopra also announced that there are plans for a Hollywood remake, and is in talks with three different American studios interested in remaking the film. Chopra stated that there is an Italian film studio also interested in remaking the film.

== Bhagat's first book ==
Five Point Someone was Bhagat's first book, written under very peculiar circumstances; in the year 2004, he was denied a promotion at Goldman Sachs, the Hong-Kong based bank where he was working. Bhagat was very depressed. Under a wave of nostalgia, as he remembered his earlier carefree times, he jotted down a few of his experiences at his college. As he added more and more experiences, the collected writings took the shape of a book.

== Awards ==
- Indo-America Society's Society Young Achiever's Award (2004)
- The Publisher's Recognition Award (2005)
- It was adapted into a play by the theatre company "Evam" which took it on a national tour in India in 2010.

== 3 Idiots controversy ==
Before the release of the film, director Rajkumar Hirani commented on the relationship between Five Point Someone and 3 Idiots:

Chetan gave me this book to read and I wanted to make a film on it. But I knew right from the start that I could not make a film completely on the book, as it was very anecdotal and a film needs a plot. So I had decided to rewrite it in a screenplay format. You'll see that the film is very different from the book. After I wrote the script, I called Chetan and narrated it to him. I told him that if he did not like the script, I would stop the project. But he was okay with it.

— Rajkumar Hirani

The day after the film opened, Chetan also noted:

Initially, I did sit down with Raju and Abhijat while they were deciding to make a film based on Five Point Someone. I even went to IIT with Abhijat a couple of times. But it was just not possible for me to be involved at every stage of the screenplay writing process since I was in Hong Kong at that time, working full-time, and busy writing other books. Moreover, Abhijat is based in the USA, Raju was in the US for quite a while working on the screenplay but it was not practical for me to do that [...] The film retains the soul of the book. 3 Idiots is different from the book but at the same time, it does borrow many things from the book. The core theme and message of the film are coming from the book itself. And that's why the makers have officially credited the film as 'Based on a novel by Chetan Bhagat.'

— Chetan Bhagat

A controversy developed a few days after the release, over the fact that Chetan's credit, "Based on the novel Five Point Someone by Chetan Bhagat", appeared in the closing credits rather than in the opening ones. At that time, Bhagat stated that he "was expecting an opening credit and I was quite surprised on not seeing it. They had bought the rights, made the payment, and committed to a credit in the contract. It’s there, but it’s not about it being there, it’s about the placement and the prominence." In a 31 December 2009 blog post on his website, Bhagat stated that he was told the movie was only 2–5% based on the book, but when he saw it, he felt that it was 70% of the book. He also argued that he was misled by the makers of the film, though he noted, that "this has nothing to do with Mr. Aamir Khan [...] I am a big fan of Aamir and he has made my story reach people. However, he was told by the makers not to read the book, and he hasn’t. Thus, he cannot comment on the issue in a meaningful manner."

A few people responded to Chetan's statements. According to the Indo-Asian News Service (IANS), during a press conference with reporters producer Vidhu Vinod Chopra "clarified that in the agreement between the producer and Bhagat, it was mentioned that the author’s name would be put in the closing credits." IANS also reported that Chopra "lost his cool" and "asked a reporter to shut up after being questioned whether his hit 3 Idiots was lifted from author Chetan Bhagat’s book Five Point Someone." Chopra later apologized, stating: "I really think I’m silly. I was provoked, but I shouldn’t have done this. I saw myself on TV and saw how I was shouting ‘shut up, shut up' like an animal. I told myself — ‘what nonsensical behavior’." Aamir Khan also responded to these claims. Rajkumar Hirani stated that "We have officially bought the rights for the film. We drew a contract with him and it clearly mentions the position of his credit. With open eyes, he had seen the contract, consulted his lawyer, and signed the agreement [...] In the contract, we have said that the title would be given in the rolling credits. We haven't changed the font size. We haven't increased the speed of the title. It's exactly there where it was agreed to be." Legal documents concerning the relationship between Bhagat and the filmmakers have been added to the Vinod Chopra Productions website as well.
