= Kulachi Hansraj Model School =

Dayanand Anglo Vedic school established in 1972

Kulachi Hansraj Model School, India, was established in 1972 by the late Shri Darbari Lal. It is a Dayanand Anglo Vedic (D.A.V.) school which educates students from kindergarten to senior secondary school grades.

== Notable alumni ==
- Sushant Singh Rajput
- Sahaj Grover
- Priyansh Arya
