= The 3 Mistakes of My Life =

2008 novel by Chetan Bhagat

- Author: Chetan Bhagat
- Language: English
- Genre: Fiction
- Publisher: Rupa Publications
- Publication date: 1 January 2008
- Publication place: India
- Media type: Paperback
- Pages: 258
- ISBN: 978-81-291-3551-3

The 3 Mistakes of My Life is the third novel written by Chetan Bhagat. The book was published in May 2008 and had an initial print run of 420,000. The novel follows the story of three friends and is based on the city of Ahmedabad in western India. This is the third best-selling novel by Chetan Bhagat.

The book follows Govind, Ishaan, and Omi. Govind tutors Ishaan's sister, Vidya, for whom Govind grows feelings.

== Translations ==
- This English national bestseller has been published in Gujarati language by a leading Gujarati book publisher, M.B.D., based in Ahmedabad & Mumbai.
- This book has been translated into Tamil and is published by Diamond Pocket Books.
- The French translation was released by Cherche Midi puPlisher in March 2010 as Les 3 erreurs de ma vie.
- It was translated into Sinhala by Dileepa Jayakodi in 2011 as Thun Thakatheerukan Karapu Kenek Man.

== Film adaptations ==
The movie version of the novel is Kai Po Che! directed by Abhishek Kapoor starring Sushant Singh Rajput, Amit Sadh & Rajkumar Rao it was released in February 2013. The film and the book are set in Gujarat, hence the title Kai Po Che!.
