= Abhishek Varman =

Indian film director and screenwriter

- Occupations: Director, Writer
- Known for: 2 States, Kalank

Abhishek Varman is an Indian film director and screenwriter. His directorial debut was the romantic drama 2 States (2014). followed by the ensemble period romantic drama Kalank (2019).

== Filmography ==
Year	Title	Director	Writer
2014	2 States	Yes	Yes
2019	Kalank	Yes	Yes

== Awards ==
Year	Film	Result
2015	Filmfare Award for Best Debut Director	Won
2015	Filmfare Award for Best Director	Nominated
