= Half Girlfriend =

2014 book by Chetan Bhagat

- First edition
- Author: Chetan Bhagat
- Language: English
- Genre: Fiction, Romance
- Publisher: Rupa & Co.
- Publication date: 1 October 2014
- Publication place: India
- Media type: Paperback
- Pages: 280
- ISBN: 978-81-291-3572-8

Half Girlfriend is an Indian English coming of age, young adult romance novel by Indian author Chetan Bhagat. The novel, set in rural Bihar, New Delhi, Patna, and New York, is the story of a Bihari boy on a quest of winning over the girl he loves. This is Bhagat's sixth novel, which was released on 1 October 2014 by Rupa Publications. The novel has also been published in Hindi and Gujarati.

Dedicated to "non English-types", as Chetan Bhagat wrote, the book divulges the sentiments and linguistic struggles of a backward, rural Bhojpuri-laced Hindi-speaking boy from Bihar as he enrolls himself at the prestigious English-medium St. Stephen’s College in New Delhi, and falls in love with a "high class English-speaking rich Delhi girl" schooled at the Modern School in the same city. The girl does not openly claim the relationship but agrees to be his "half girlfriend". Chetan Bhagat commented, "'half-girlfriend', to me, is a unique Indian phenomenon where boys and girls are not clear about their relationship status with each other. A boy may think he is more than friends with the girl, but the girl is still not his girlfriend. Hence, I thought we needed a term like 'half girlfriend'. Because, in India, that is what most men get."

== Plot ==
Madhav Jha, a rural boy from Dumraon, a village in Bihar, comes to meet the author, who is actually Chetan Bhagat, and leaves behind a few journals from his half-girlfriend, who he believes has died. Chetan Bhagat calls him up the next morning to hear his story. He starts by describing his trouble entering St. Stephens, as his English wasn't good enough. Being a good basketball player, Madhav gets accepted through the sports program.

The rich and beautiful Riya Somani is a Marwari girl from Delhi, who is also selected through the sports program. Madhav and Riya become close friends due to their association with basketball. Madhav wants to make her his girlfriend, but she refuses. He demands that they get physical. Offended by his obscene ultimatum, Riya parts company with him and tells him not to talk to her anymore.

A year later, Riya marries her childhood friend Rohan and settles in London, where Rohan has a big business. Finding Delhi unbearable on the grounds of losing Riya, Madhav decides to settle in his hometown Dumraon and helps his mother, Rani Sahiba, who runs her school. Seeing the condition of the school – no proper classes or toilets – Madhav decides to meet local MLA Ojha for financial help, but the MLA refuses to help. An opportunity comes when Ojha informs Madhav about Bill Gates' visit to some schools in Bihar. Madhav tries his best to convince Gates to fund his school, but to do so he has to prepare a speech, in English.

In the course of his struggle, he comes across Riya, who is now a divorcee. Riya helps him prepare the speech. The two are successful in their fundraising, but after the speech, Riya leaves a letter for him which states that she is in the last stage of lung cancer and has only 3 months left to survive. Riya's letter confesses her love for Madhav even though she doesn't have much time left. When Madhav attempts to track her down, he finds that she has cut all ties in India and has disappeared.

After three years, it is revealed from Riya's journals that she is alive and that she had faked her cancer. Madhav goes search of her in New York. After three months of extensively searching, he finds her at Cafe Wha, and the two reconcile and finally begin their relationship.

The book ends with the author visiting the rural school in Dumraon, three and a half years later, and seeing that both Madhav and Riya are successfully running the school, and have a son, Shyam.

== Main characters ==
- Madhav Jha, a guy from Bihar
- Riya Somani, a sindhirich girl from Delhi
- Rani Sahiba, Madhav's mother
- Shailesh, Madhav's college friend
- Rohan Chandak, Riya's ex-husband and childhood friend
- Chetan Bhagat, as himself
- MLA Ojha, from Bihar
- Erica, a bar singer in New York
- Samantha Myers, from the Bill Gates Foundation
- Shyam, Madhav's son
- Ghanshyam Ashu, Madhav's friend from Darbhanga Bihar
- Bill Gates, as himself

== Reception ==
Rituparna Chatterjee of CNN-IBN called it a "massively disappointing book written exclusively for another Bollywood sobfest". Pranav Joshi of Daily News and Analysis called it "old wine in new glass" with a rehashed storyline that promotes negative stereotypes.

== Adaptation ==
The film rights to the novel were sold before it was published. A Bollywood film adaptation directed by Mohit Suri and produced by Ekta Kapoor and Bhagat. It stars Arjun Kapoor and Shraddha Kapoor. It is the first film produced by Bhagat.

Initially the film based on the novel starred Kriti Sanon who inaugurated the book, but was replaced by Shraddha Kapoor. The film released on 19 May 2017.
