= Chetan Bhagat =

Indian celebrity columnist (born 1974)

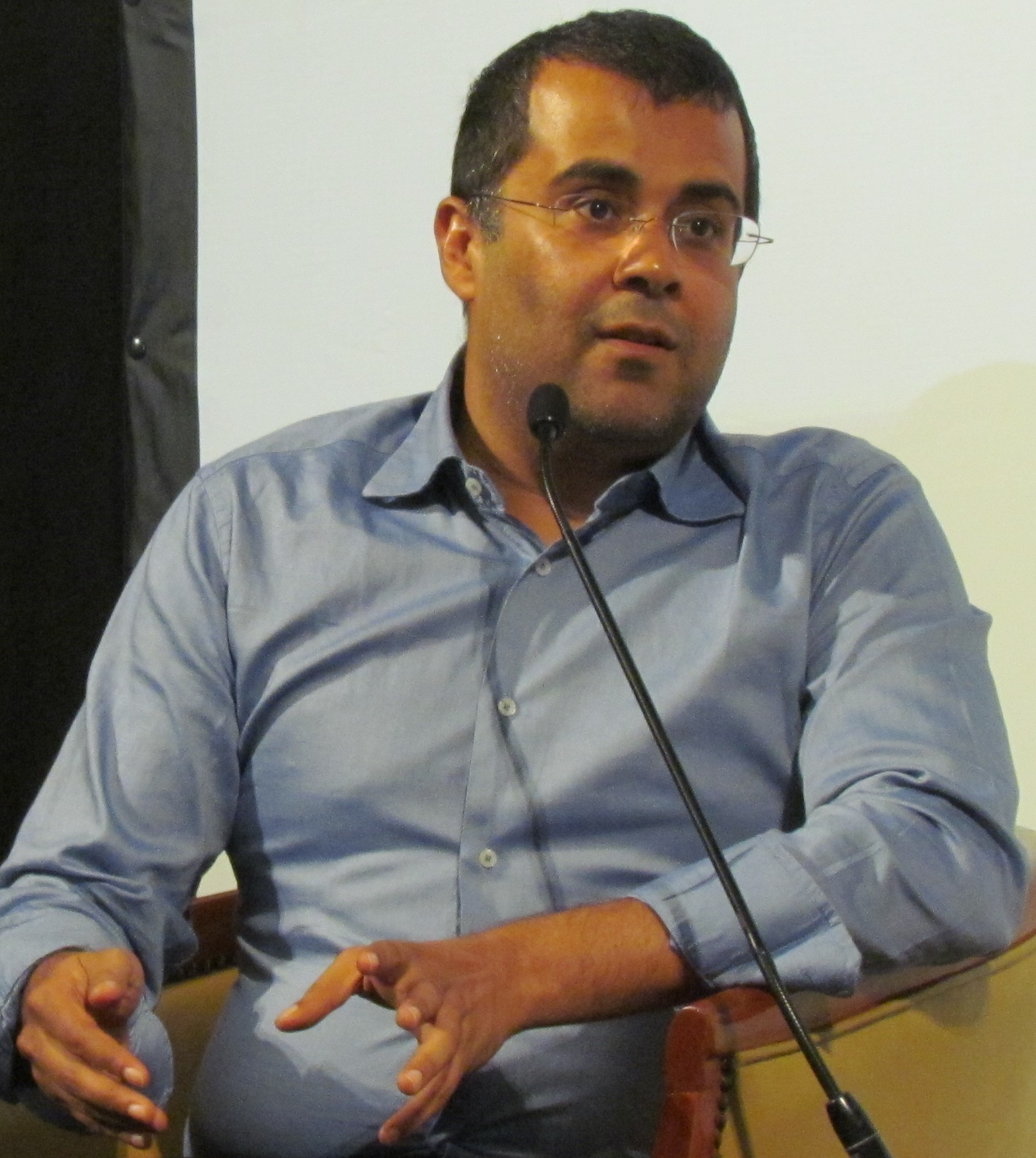
- Chetan Bhagat official portfolio
- Born: Chetan Prakash Bhagat; 22 April 1974 (age 52); New Delhi, India
- Education: Indian Institute of Technology, Delhi (B.Tech); Indian Institute of Management, Ahmedabad (MBA)
- Spouse: Anusha Suryanarayan (m. 1998)
- Children: 2
- Writing career
- Language: English, Hindi
- Years active: 2004–present
- Genres: Romance, realistic fiction, non-fiction, suspense, thriller
- Notable works: Five Point Someone, 2 States: The Story of My Marriage, The 3 Mistakes of My Life
- Website: www.chetanbhagat.com

Chetan Prakash Bhagat (born 22 April 1974) is an Indian author, columnist, screenwriter, and YouTuber. He was included in Time magazine's list of the 100 Most Influential People in the World in 2010. Several of his novels have been adapted into films, including One Night at the Call Center, Half Girlfriend, 2 states, 3 Idiots.

== Early life and education ==
Chetan Bhagat was raised in a traditional Punjabi Hindu family. His father was a lieutenant colonel in the Indian Army, and his mother worked as a scientist at the Indian Agricultural Research Institute in New Delhi. Bhagat attended the Army Public School, Dhaula Kuan, where he developed an interest in writing and contributed jokes to the school magazine.

In 1995, Bhagat graduated with a Bachelor's of Technology degree in Mechanical Engineering from the Indian Institute of Technology, Delhi. He then attended the IIM Ahmedabad (IIMA), receiving a degree in Business Administration with a specialisation in marketing in 1997. In 2018, IIMA awarded him the Young Alumni Achiever's Award in the Arts & Entertainment category.

== Career ==
=== Banking ===
Before becoming a full-time writer, Chetan Bhagat spent nearly 11 years working as an investment banker, primarily in Hong Kong. He began his banking career at Peregrine Investments Holdings in Canada, which ceased operations after six months. He then joined Goldman Sachs in Hong Kong, working there for several years. Later, he moved to Deutsche Bank in Mumbai, where he was a director.

During his time at Goldman Sachs, Bhagat wrote his first novel, Five Point Someone (2004), and his second novel, One Night at the Call Center (2005). In March 2008, Bhagat returned to India as a director at Deutsche Bank in Mumbai. The same year, his third novel, The 3 Mistakes of My Life (2008), was published. Following the commercial success of the novel, Bhagat left his banking career to become a full-time author.

=== Author ===
His debut novel, Five Point Someone was published by Rupa Publications in Delhi in 2004.

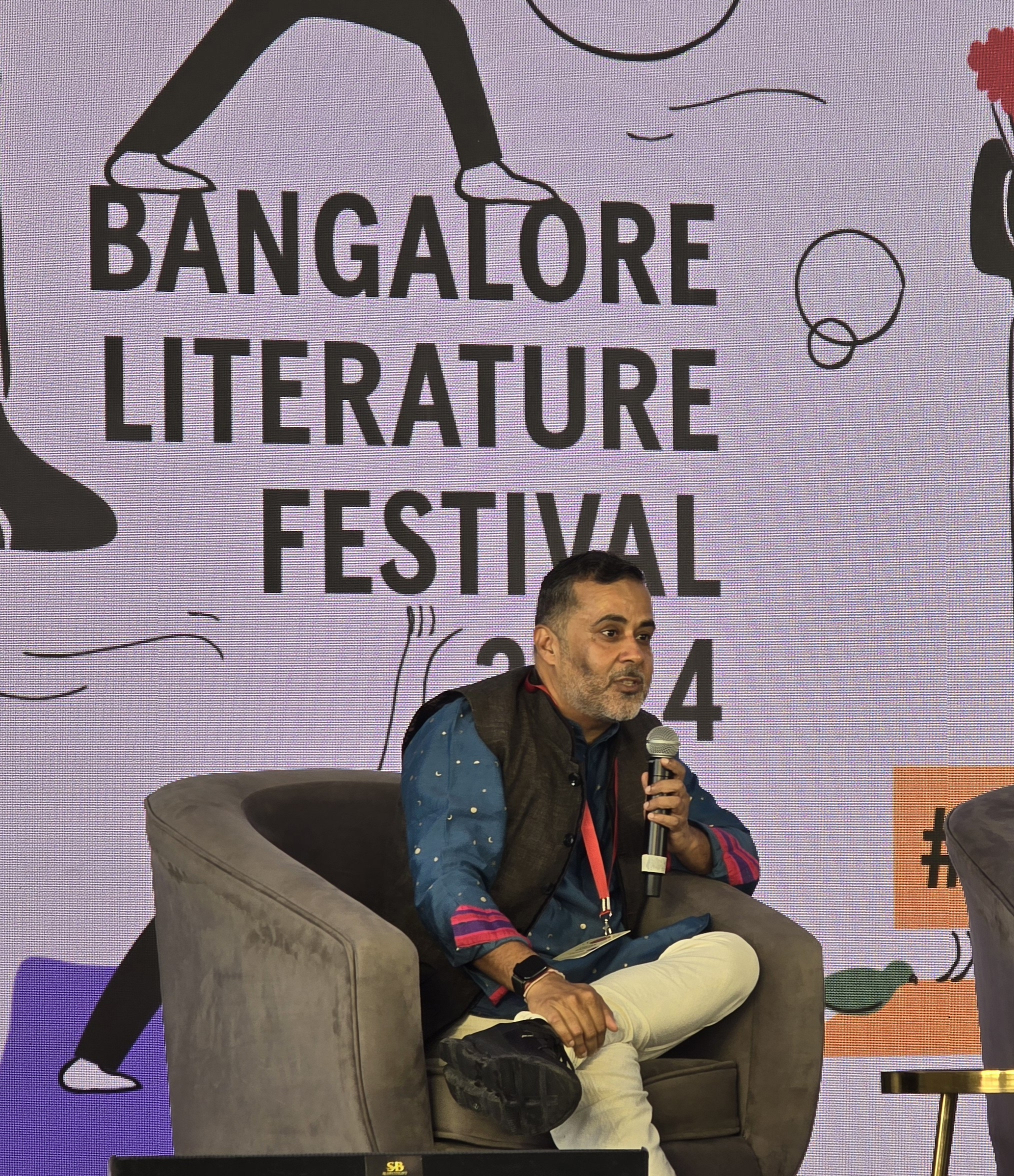
Chetan Bhagat at BlrLitFest 2024

Bhagat's second book, One Night at the Call Center, was published in 2005. It sold almost 50,000 copies in the first three days of its release. His third novel, The 3 Mistakes of My Life, was published in 2008.

Bhagat's fourth novel, 2 States, was published in 2009 and drew inspiration from his marriage with Anusha Suryanarayan. Bhagat's later novels Revolution 2020, Half Girlfriend, and One Indian Girl were also commercially successful.

In 2018, Bhagat published The Girl in Room 105. This was followed by One Arranged Murder in 2020 and 400 Days in 2021.

=== Screen presence ===
Bhagat was a judge, along with Marzi Pestonji and Preity Zinta, on the dance reality show Nach Baliye season 7, which aired on the Indian television channel Star Plus.

Bhagat also appeared in the Netflix's series Decoupled, which stars R. Madhavan in the lead role. In the show, Madhavan plays the second-bestselling author in India, while Bhagat portrays himself as India's bestselling author and Madhavan's rival.

=== Screenwriting ===
For Kai Po Che (2013), based on his novel The 3 Mistakes of My Life, Bhagat was one of the four screenplay writers. The film was a commercial success and Bhagat, along with Pubali Chaudhuri, Supratik Sen, and Abhishek Kapoor, won the Filmfare Award for Best Screenplay for Kai Po Che! at the 68th Filmfare Awards.

=== YouTube ===
Bhagat also runs a YouTube channel featuring motivational videos. He launched a podcast, "Deep Talk with Chetan Bhagat", where he interviews guests about their paths to success.

== Personal life ==
In 1998, Bhagat married Anusha Suryanarayan, whom he met in college at the IIM. One of his novels, "2 States," was inspired by their relationship. They have twin sons named Shyam Bhagat and Ishaan Bhagat.

Following the MeToo movement in India, an anonymous woman accused Bhagat of inappropriate behaviour. Screenshots of a WhatsApp conversation were shared, suggesting he pursued her despite her apparent lack of interest. Bhagat later issued an apology on Facebook, acknowledging his actions.

== Bibliography ==
=== Novels ===
==== Standalone ====
- Five Point Someone (2005)
- One Night at the Call Center (2006)
- The 3 Mistakes of My Life (2008)
- 2 States (2009)
- Revolution 2020 (2011)
- Half Girlfriend (2014)
- One Indian Girl (2016)
- 12 Years: My Messed-Up Love Story (2025)

==== Series ====
1. The Girl in Room 105 (2018)
2. One Arranged Murder (2020)
3. 400 Days (2021)

=== Filmography ===
Five of Bhagat's novels have been adapted into films:

- Hello (2008) – Based on the book "One Night at the Call Center"
- 3 Idiots (2009), Nanban (2012), and 3 Idiotas (2017) – Based on the book "Five Point Someone"
- Kai Po Che! (2013) – Based on the book "The 3 Mistakes of My Life"
- 2 States (2014) – Based on the book "2 States"
- Half Girlfriend (2017) – Based on the book "Half Girlfriend"

=== Non-fiction ===
- What Young India Wants (2012)
- Making India Awesome (2015)
- India Positive (2019)
- 11 Rules For Life: Secrets to Level Up (2024)

== Awards and accolades ==
- Chetan Bhagat was recognised as the "Best outgoing student" by the IIM Ahmedabad in 1997.
- He received the Society Young Achiever's Award in 2000.
- He won the Publisher's Recognition Award in 2005.
- Included in Time magazine's list of the World's 100 Most Influential People of 2010 in the Artists category.
- Listed at No. 47 among the "100 Most Creative People 2011" by the Fast Company American business magazine.
- Won the "CNN-IBN Indian of the Year 2014" award in the Entertainment category.
- Ranked No. 82 on the 2017 Forbes India Celebrity 100 list.
- Received the IBN Live Movie Awards for Best Screenplay for *Kai Po Che* in 2014.
- Received the Zee Cine Awards in 2014 for Best Story for *Kai Po Che*.
- Honoured with the Golden Book Awards in 2022 for the book *400 Days*.
