= One Night @ the Call Center =

2005 novel by Chetan Bhagat

One Night @ The Call Center
- Author: Chetan Bhagat
- Cover artist: Chetan Bhagat; Samantha Holyoak
- Language: English
- Genre: Fiction
- Publisher: Rupa Publications
- Publication date: 5 October 2005
- Publication place: India
- Media type: Paperback
- Pages: 267
- ISBN: 81-291-0818-6 (Paperback edition)
- OCLC: 63276386
- LC Class: MLCM 2005/00074 (P) PR9499.3.B

One Night at the Call Center is a novel written by Chetan Bhagat, first published in 2005. The novel revolves around a group of six call center employees working at a call center in Gurgaon, Haryana, India. The themes involve the anxieties and insecurities of the young Indian middle class, such as career, inadequacy, marriage, and family conflicts.

The book was the second best-selling novel from the author after Five Point Someone.

== Plot ==
The book begins with a frame story recounting a train journey from Kanpur to Delhi. During the journey, the author meets a beautiful girl who offers to tell him a story on the condition that he has to make it his second book. After a lot of hesitation, the author agrees. The story is about six people working in a call center and relates the events that happen one night when get a phone-call from 'God'. Claimed to be based on a true story, the author uses Shyam Mehra (alias Sam Marcy) as the narrator, who is one among the six call center employees. Shyam loves but has lost Priyanka, who is now planning an arranged marriage with someone else, Vroom loves Esha, Esha wants to be a model, Radhika is in an unhappy marriage with a demanding mother-in-law, and Military Uncle wants to communicate with his grandson. They all hate Bakshi, their cruel and somewhat sadistic boss.

To cheer themselves up, all the lead characters of the novel decide to go to a night club. After enjoying for a while, they leave back for the office. While returning, they face a life-threatening situation when their vehicle crashes into a construction site hanging over a mesh of iron construction rods. As the rods began to yield slowly, they start to panic. They are unable to call for help as there is no mobile phone network at that place, but Shyam's mobile phone starts ringing. The phone call is from God, who speaks modern English. He speaks to all of them and gives them suggestions to improve their life, and advises them on how to get their vehicle out of the construction site. The conversation with God motivates the group to such an extent that they get ready to face their problems with determination and motivation. Meanwhile, Vroom and Shyam hatch a plan to throw Bakshi out of the call center and prevent the closing of the call center, whose employees are to be downsized radically. When they return to the call center, they carry out their plan successfully. At the end, each character has fixed a part of their life, and the author invites readers to identify aspects of themselves and their lives that they would like to change.

== Characters ==
- Shyam Mehra (Sam Marcy) - The main protagonist, Priyanka's ex-boyfriend, and Vroom's best friend. He is 26 years old and is perpetually afraid to propose to Priyanka for marriage. Due to Priyanka's mother distrusting him, Priyanka and Shyam breakup. He is always a slave to Bakshi.
- Priyanka Sinha - Shyam's ex-girlfriend who he later reunites with. She was going to get married abroad to Ganesh, which made Shyam find it difficult to look her in the eyes.
- Varun Malhotra (Victor Meller), aka Vroom - He is nicknamed Vroom because of his love for vehicles. He is 22 years old. He has a crush on Esha though he never admits it straight. He tries proposing to Esha but she rejects it because of his obsession with girls, pizza, and vehicles. His parents' divorce made him depressed, though he doesn't show his sadness as he hates sympathy. At the end of the book, Esha accepts a date with Vroom. He hates Bakshi and never volunteers to help Bakshi, unlike Shyam.
- Esha Singh (Eliza Singer) - An aspiring model. She always wears modern dresses and was voted THE HOTTEST CHICK by her office colleagues. She came to Chandigarh against her parents will. By the end of the book, she becomes a member of NGO and accepts a date with Vroom.
- Radikha Jha (Regina Jones) - The only married member of the group. She married her college boyfriend Anuj for love, living with his traditional family. Her mother-in-law hates her and always complains about her to Anuj which makes Anuj berate at her, as he only trusts his mother. It is later revealed that Anuj is having an extra-marital affair and so Radhika divorces him and moves in with Esha.
- Military Uncle - Military Uncle lives alone and is having some problems with his daughter in law and son, but at the end he realizes his mistake and decide to apologize. Military Uncle works at the call centre to earn a little money aside from the pension that he gets.
- Subhash Bakshi - Shyam's, Priyanka's, Esha's, Vroom's and Radhika's boss. An idiot who is going to be transferred to Boston thus saving him from getting fired. He took credit for a website manual which was made by Shyam and Vroom.
- Shefali - Shyam's second ex-girlfriend. Shyam wanted to move on from Priyanka and thus started dating Shefali. Shefali is a rather minor character.

== Translations and adaptations ==
The book has been translated into Hindi and was published by Prabhat Prakash. It was translated to Sinhala by Dileepa Jayakody and published in 2009 as Halo! Halo!. The book was also adapted into a film titled Hello in 2008.
