= Taare Zameen Par (disambiguation) =

Taare Zameen Par is a 2007 Indian film by Aamir Khan.

Taare Zameen Par (lit. 'Stars on the Earth') may also refer to:

- "Taare Zameen Par", title track of the 2007 film by Shankar Mahadevan and Dominique Cerejo
- Taare Zameen Par (soundtrack), soundtrack of the 2007 film by Shankar–Ehsaan–Loy
- Taare Zameen Par (TV series), 2020 Indian reality show
- List of accolades received by Taare Zameen Par

== See also ==
- Every child is special
- Sitaare Zameen Par (disambiguation)
