= List of accolades received by Taare Zameen Par =

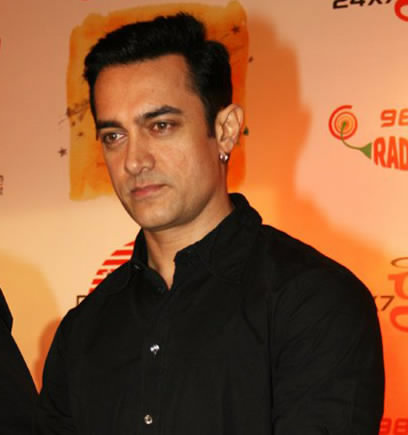
- Critics praised Aamir Khan for his directorial debut, which garnered him many awards.
Accolades
Award	Won	Nominated
Filmfare Awards	5	11
Gollapudi Srinivas Award	1	1
National Film Awards	3	3
Producers Guild Film Awards	7	12
Screen Awards	7	16
Stardust Awards	1	4
V. Shantaram Awards	4	4
Zee Cine Awards	6	9
- Total number of awards and nominations (Note: Awards in certain categories do not have prior nominations and only winners are announced by the jury. For simplification and to avoid errors, each award in this list has been presumed to have had a prior nomination.)
Totals	34	60
- References

Taare Zameen Par, later reissued as Like Stars on Earth for Disney's international edition DVD, is a 2007 Indian drama film directed by Aamir Khan. Creative Director and writer Amole Gupte initially developed the idea with his wife Deepa Bhatia, who served as the film's editor. Visual effects were created by Tata Elxsi's Visual Computing Labs, and the title animation—the first use of claymation in a Bollywood film—was created by Dhimant Vyas. Shankar–Ehsaan–Loy composed the film's score, and Prasoon Joshi wrote the lyrics for many of the songs. Principal photography took place in Mumbai and in Panchgani's New Era High School, and some of the school's students make appearances.

Walt Disney Company Home Entertainment, which acquired 33 percent of UTV Software Communications, bought the DVD rights for distribution in North America, the United Kingdom, and Australia for ₹ 7 crore (US$1.68 million). This marked "the first time an international studio has bought the video rights of an Indian film." Disney released the film in Region 2 on 26 October 2009, in Region 1 on 12 January 2010, and in Region 4 on 29 March 2010. A three-disc set, the Disney version features the original Hindi audio soundtrack with English subtitles or another dubbed in English, as well as bonus material such as audio commentary, deleted scenes, and the musical soundtrack.

== Awards and nominations ==
Award (Note: Awards, festivals and organizations are in Alphabetical order.)	Date of ceremony (Note: Date is linked to the article about the awards held that year, wherever possible.)	Category	Recipient(s)	Result	Ref.
Filmfare Awards	16 February 2008	Best Film	Aamir Khan	Won	
Filmfare Awards	16 February 2008	Best Director	Aamir Khan	Won	
Filmfare Awards	16 February 2008	Best Story	Amole Gupte	Won	
Filmfare Awards	16 February 2008	Best Screenplay	Amole Gupte	Nominated	
Filmfare Awards	16 February 2008	Best Dialogue	Amole Gupte	Nominated	
Filmfare Awards	16 February 2008	Best Actor	Darsheel Safary	Nominated	
Filmfare Awards	16 February 2008	Critics Award for Best Actor	Darsheel Safary	Won	
Filmfare Awards	16 February 2008	Best Male Debut	Darsheel Safary	Nominated	
Filmfare Awards	16 February 2008	Best Supporting Actor	Aamir Khan	Nominated	
Filmfare Awards	16 February 2008	Best Supporting Actress	Tisca Chopra	Nominated	
Filmfare Awards	16 February 2008	Best Lyricist	Prasoon Joshi ("Maa")	Won	
Gollapudi Srinivas Award	12 August 2008	Best First Film for a Director	Aamir Khan	Won	
National Film Awards	21 October 2009	Best Film on Family Welfare	Producer : Aamir Khan; Director : Aamir Khan	Won	
National Film Awards	21 October 2009	Best Lyrics	Prasoon Joshi ("Maa")	Won	
National Film Awards	21 October 2009	Best Male Playback Singer	Shankar Mahadevan ("Maa")	Won	
Producers Guild Film Awards (Note: Previously known as Apsara Film & Television Producers Guild Awards.)	5 December 2009	Best Film	Aamir Khan	Won	
Producers Guild Film Awards	5 December 2009	Best Director	Aamir Khan	Won	
Producers Guild Film Awards	5 December 2009	Best Story	Amole Gupte	Won	
Producers Guild Film Awards	5 December 2009	Best Screenplay	Amole Gupte	Won	
Producers Guild Film Awards	5 December 2009	Best Dialogue	Amole Gupte	Nominated	
Producers Guild Film Awards	5 December 2009	Best Actor in a Leading Role	Darsheel Safary	Nominated	
Producers Guild Film Awards	5 December 2009	Best Music Director	Shankar–Ehsaan–Loy	Nominated	
Producers Guild Film Awards	5 December 2009	Best Lyricist	Prasoon Joshi ("Maa")	Won	
Producers Guild Film Awards	5 December 2009	Best Male Playback Singer	Shankar Mahadevan ("Maa")	Won	
Producers Guild Film Awards	5 December 2009	Best Choreography	Saroj Khan	Nominated	
Producers Guild Film Awards	5 December 2009	Best Editing	Deepa Bhatia	Nominated	
Producers Guild Film Awards	5 December 2009	Best Special Effects	Vaibhav Kumaresh & Dhimant Vyas	Won	
Screen Awards	10 January 2008	Best Film	Aamir Khan	Nominated	
Screen Awards	10 January 2008	Best Director	Aamir Khan (Note: Shared with Shimit Amin for Chak De! India)	Won	
Screen Awards	10 January 2008	Most Promising Debut Director	Aamir Khan	Won	
Screen Awards	10 January 2008	Best Story	Amole Gupte	Won	
Screen Awards	10 January 2008	Best Screenplay	Amole Gupte	Nominated	
Screen Awards	10 January 2008	Best Dialogue	Amole Gupte	Won	
Screen Awards	10 January 2008	Best Supporting Actor	Aamir Khan	Won	
Screen Awards	10 January 2008	Best Supporting Actor	Vipin Sharma	Nominated	
Screen Awards	10 January 2008	Best Supporting Actress	Tisca Chopra	Nominated	
Screen Awards	10 January 2008	Best Child Artist	Darsheel Safary	Won	
Screen Awards	10 January 2008	Best Music Director	Shankar–Ehsaan–Loy	Nominated	
Screen Awards	10 January 2008	Best Background Music	Shankar–Ehsaan–Loy	Nominated	
Screen Awards	10 January 2008	Best Lyricist	Prasoon Joshi ("Maa")	Won	
Screen Awards	10 January 2008	Best Male Playback Singer	Shankar Mahadevan ("Maa")	Nominated	
Screen Awards	10 January 2008	Best Male Playback Singer	Shankar Mahadevan ("Taare Zameen Par")	Nominated	
Screen Awards	10 January 2008	Best Special Effects (Visual)	Tata Elxsi	Nominated	
Stardust Awards	25 January 2008	Best Film	Aamir Khan	Nominated	
Stardust Awards	25 January 2008	Dream Director	Aamir Khan	Nominated	
Stardust Awards	25 January 2008	Actor of the Year – Male	Aamir Khan	Nominated	
Stardust Awards	25 January 2008	Best Supporting Actress	Tisca Chopra	Won	
V. Shantaram Awards	19 November 2007	Best Film (Gold)	Aamir Khan	Won	
V. Shantaram Awards	19 November 2007	Best Director (Silver)	Aamir Khan	Won	
V. Shantaram Awards	19 November 2007	Best Writer	Amole Gupte	Won	
V. Shantaram Awards	19 November 2007	Best Actor	Darsheel Safary	Won	
Zee Cine Awards	26 April 2008	Best Film	Aamir Khan	Nominated	
Zee Cine Awards	26 April 2008	Best Director	Aamir Khan	Won	
Zee Cine Awards	26 April 2008	Most Promising Debut Director	Aamir Khan	Won	
Zee Cine Awards	26 April 2008	Best Story	Amole Gupte	Won	
Zee Cine Awards	26 April 2008	Critics Award for Best Actor – Male	Darsheel Safary	Won	
Zee Cine Awards	26 April 2008	Most Promising Debut Child Artist	Darsheel Safary	Won	
Zee Cine Awards	26 April 2008	Best Actor in a Supporting Role – Male	Aamir Khan	Nominated	
Zee Cine Awards	26 April 2008	Best Actor in a Supporting Role – Female	Tisca Chopra	Nominated	
Zee Cine Awards	26 April 2008	Best Lyricist	Prasoon Joshi ("Maa")	Won	

=== List of submissions to the 81st Academy Awards for Best Foreign Language Film ===
- Taare Zameen Par was initially acclaimed as India's official entry for the 2009 Academy Awards Best Foreign Film, but after it failed to make the short list, a debate began in the Indian media as to why Indian films never win Oscars.

== See also ==
- List of Bollywood films of 2007
