= Chatha Pacha (soundtrack) =

2026 soundtrack album

Soundtrack album by Shankar–Ehsaan–Loy
- Released: 21 January 2026
- Recorded: 2025–2026
- Studio: Purple Haze Studios, Mumbai; Lambodara Studios, Mumbai
- Genre: Feature film soundtrack
- Length: 18:39
- Language: Malayalam
- Label: T-Series
- Producer: Shankar–Ehsaan–Loy; DAWgeek

Shankar–Ehsaan–Loy chronology
Sitaare Zameen Par (2025)	Chatha Pacha (2026)	Kaaliyan (2026)

Chatha Pacha is the soundtrack album composed by Shankar–Ehsaan–Loy to the 2026 Malayalam-language sports action comedy film of the same name directed by Adhvaith Nayar and produced by Ritesh S. Ramakrishnan, Ramesh S. Ramakrishnan and Shihan Shoukath of Reel World Entertainment, starring Roshan Mathew, Arjun Ashokan, Vishak Nair and Ishan Shoukath. The film marked the trio's Malayalam debut as a composer. The album featured five songs with lyrics written by Vinayak Sasikumar, Fejo, MC Couper and DAWgeek, and was released through T-Series on 21 January 2026.

== Development ==
The musical trio Shankar–Ehsaan–Loy composed the soundtrack for Chatha Pacha in their maiden Malayalam film. Their involvement was confirmed by the producers in February 2025. Mujeeb Majeed composed the background score. Vinayak Sasikumar wrote lyrics for all the songs, with rap portions being written by Fejo, MC Couper and DAWgeek.

Shihan noted that the co-producer Ritesh, was a close friend of Shankar Mahadevan, and he was instrumental in bringing the trio on board. Mahadevan also admitted at the film's promotional event, that they had a few offers from Malayalam cinema which did not materialize, but felt this project to be rightful as they liked the colorful and youthful ideas presented in the film, as well as their nostalgic connection to WWE helped them to be on board.

Mahadevan stated that the story, the characters, world and emotions, helped them to explore a lot musically. He also admitted the team curated a soundscape that stayed true to the film's pulse while adding their touch of musical sensibilities. They also experimented with a diverse range of genres that had been reflected in the songs. He denoted that, "working on the soundtrack has been great fun", recalling the overall experience. Much of the film's musical and lyrical structure had been designed without interrupting the local flavor of Mattancherry. The soundtrack was recorded at the Purple Haze Studios and Lambodara Studios in Mumbai. T-Series acquired the film's music rights.

== Release ==
The album was preceded by the first single, "Chatha Pacha Title Track", which was released on 15 December 2025. Adhvaith Nayar denoted that they wanted a "fun, action-packed spirit" of the film and what it intended to communicate the audience right from the onset. The second single, "Naattile Rowdies", was released on 12 January 2026. The film's music and trailer launch event was held at Lulu Mall, Kochi, with the trio and the singers performing the songs live. However, the soundtrack was released on 21 January 2026, a day ahead of the film's release.

== Track listing ==
No.	Title	Lyrics	Singer(s)	Length
1.	"Chatha Pacha Title Track"	Vinayak Sasikumar, Fejo	Shankar Mahadevan, Siddharth Mahadevan, Fejo	3:47
2.	"Nenjile"	Vinayak Sasikumar	Shankar Mahadevan, Vijay Yesudas, Anoop Sankar	3:20
3.	"Naattile Rowdies"	Vinayak Sasikumar	Benny Dayal	3:28
4.	"Level Up"	Vinayak Sasikumar, MC Couper, DAWgeek	Anand Sreeraj, MC Couper, DAWgeek	4:27
5.	"Carnival"	Vinayak Sasikumar, MC Couper	Shankar Mahadevan, Pranavam Sasi, MC Couper	3:37
Total length:				18:39

== Reception ==
Anandu Suresh of The Indian Express wrote "the Shankar-Ehsaan-Loy trio makes their presence felt in their debut Malayalam movie as composers." Swathi P Ajith of OnManorama wrote "Shankar–Ehsaan–Loy's music adds punch, without overwhelming the film." Sanjay Ponnappa of India Today noted that the trio's music is "effective, though nothing particularly stands out." Vignesh Madhu of The New Indian Express called the music "rousing".

== Personnel ==
Credits adapted from liner notes:

- Music composer: Shankar–Ehsaan–Loy
- Music producer: Shankar–Ehsaan–Loy, DAWgeek
- Recording studios: Purple Haze Studios, Lambodara Studio
- Recording engineer: Abhay Anant Rumde, Ameya Mategaonkar, Pathin Bhowmick
- Mixing and mastering: Abin Paul @mixwithabin
- Studio manager: Shirin Sukheswala
