= Sitaare Zameen Par (disambiguation) =

Sitaare Zameen Par is a 2025 Indian film by R. S. Prasanna.

Sitaare Zameen Par (lit. 'Stars on Earth') may also refer to:

- "Sitaare Zameen Par", title track of the 2025 film by Shankar Mahadevan, Siddharth Mahadevan and Divya Kumar
- Sitaare Zameen Par (soundtrack), soundtrack of the 2025 film by Shankar–Ehsaan–Loy
- Sitaare Zameen Par (TV series), 2008 Indian reality show

== See also ==
- Taare Zameen Par (disambiguation)
