= Investment (film) =

- Directed by: Ratnakar Matkari
- Written by: Ratnakar Matkari
- Based on: Investment Novella by Ratnakar Matkari
- Produced by: Pratibha Matkari; Mandar Vaidya
- Starring: Tushar Dalvi; Supriya Vinod; Sulbha Deshpande; Sanjay Mone; Sandeep Pathak; Praharsh Naik
- Cinematography: Amol Gole
- Edited by: Sagar Vanjari
- Music by: Madhav Vijay
- Production companies: Mahadwar Productions; Indu Enterprises
- Release dates: October 2012 (Mumbai Film Festival); 20 September 2013
- Running time: 122 minutes
- Country: India
- Language: Marathi

Investment is a 2013 Marathi film written and directed by Ratnakar Matkari and produced by Pratibha Matkari for Mahadwar Productions. The leading roles are played by Tushar Dalvi, Supriya Vinod, Sulbha Deshpande, Sanjay Mone, Sandeep Pathak, Bhagyashri Pane, Praharsh Naik, Soham Kolvankar and Milind Phatak who are prominent actors from the Indian film industry. The director of photography is Amol Gole, the sound design is handled by Shantanu Akerkar and Dinesh Uchil with Madhav Vijay providing the background score.

== Synopsis ==
Investment tells the story of a typical ‘upwardly mobile’ couple: Aashish, an ambitious young man, about to change his job to join an American firm, and his wife Prachi, who is encouraging and eager to move into a higher class of society. (This couple is indicative of the young people in urban areas thriving to achieve more, albeit at cost of social values). The couple has a twelve-year-old son, Sohel, who is being brought up with much care and with a dream of raising a successful Politician of the Future, a field which they believe is promising due to its lucrative opportunities of growth, power and finance.

Sohel is a rather spoilt & self-centered brat who believes and follows his father's motto of ‘always getting what he wants’. He sends a love note to his classmate Deepa Gangan who hails from a totally different social strata and her father informs Ashish and Prachi to keep their son at bay. Deepa is found missing and Sohel claims that he is unaware of her whereabouts. Deepa's dead body is found by the police the next day. From this point forward in the film the issues of morality of different characters comes to the fore with the resolution of the crime while testing and making a remark on the materialistic point of view with which today's generation is approaching moral values.

The aftermath represents the slow but sure criminalization accompanied by the total lack of regret of the educated young middle-class, with subsequent disregard for moral values, and thus forms the terribly realistic & therefore shocking climax of the film.

== Cast ==
- Tushar Dalvi as Aashish
- Supriya Vinod as Prachi
- Sulbha Deshpande as Aai
- Sanjay Mone Sandesh Gadkar
- Sandeep Pathak as Gangan
- Bhagyashri Pane as Mrs. Gangan
- Praharsh Naik as Sohel
- Soham Kolvankar as Rajat Popat
- Milind Phatak as Bakre

== Production ==
=== Development ===
The origin of the film came about in the year 2003 when the story was published, as a Novella, in one of the most prestigious & progressive magazines in the State with a large subscriber base. The story, when published received enormous positive response due to the unusually realistic & uncompromising treatment that made the reader identify with it. Many prominent theatre and Film personalities approached the Writer, Ratnakar Matkari, for rights to convert the story into a film, but he refused as he himself wanted to make the film based on the story. The story was adapted for the film by 2006 when the screenplay was ready. While researching the most appropriate way of making this film Ratnakar Matkari and Associate Director Ganesh Matkari met Amol Gole, who is considered as one of the recent prominent discovery in the Digital media and has to his credit critically acclaimed films like Stanley Ka Dabba, Gajar, Ha Bharat Maza. He was excited to work on the film and readily agreed to shoot the film. The technical aspects were all tied up but the finance was yet to be tied. Miraculously around this time the Producers met Mandar Vaidya and Anish Joshi through a mutual acquaintance and they agreed to finance the film as co-producers. The entire film is shot digitally in one schedule and the shooting time for the schedule was 21 days in Mumbai.

== Music ==
The music is largely in form of a background score and is largely used to enhance the various moods and scenes within the film.

== Release ==
The film has won the National Award for the Best Marathi Feature Film at The 60th National Film Awards (India). The film has premiered in the Mumbai International Film Festival 2012 organized by MAMI, Mumbai Academy of the Moving Image after which it has been screened in prominent Film Festivals like the Pune International Film Festival 2012,Bangalore International Film Festival (BIFF) 2012, Chennai International Film Festival 2012. The film has also been screened at New York Indian Film Festival (NYIFF) 2012 with four nominations for Best Film, Ratnakar Matkari for Best Screenplay, Praharsh Naik as Best Child Artist And Supriya Vinod for Best Actress, The film has been honored with the Prahhar Bhushan Award conferred by Prahar. The film was screened recently at the Stuttgart Indian Film Festival 2013 and received wide appreciation and applause.
