= Partho Gupte =

Indian child actor

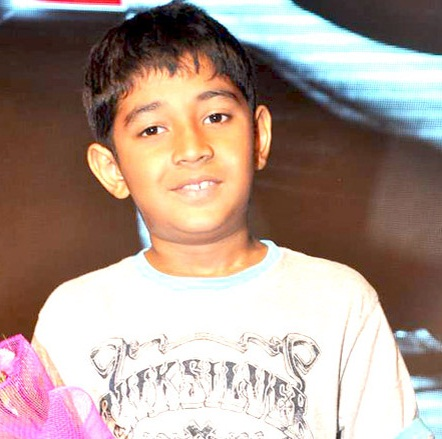
- Occupation: Actor
- Years active: 2011-Present
- Parent(s): Amole Gupte, Deepa Bhatia
- Awards: Filmfare Special Award

Partho Gupte is an Indian child actor who made his debut in the film Stanley Ka Dabba in 2011. He was awarded a Filmfare Special Award for his performance.

== Career ==
Gupte debuted in the film Stanley Ka Dabba, winning a number of awards for his debut. Stanley Ka Dabba follows the story of Stanley who is popular among his friends but he never brings his tiffin or lunch box and is interested to eat other's lunch and others share their tiffin with him. The film was made on a very low budget. After the success of Taare Zameen Par Amole Gupte wanted to make a small, non-mainstream film. He borrowed money from friends and began shooting with a five-man crew in a Mumbai school, Stanley Ka Dabba made Rs 3.8 crore in its first two weeks.

== Filmography ==
Year	Title	Role	Notes
2011	Stanley Ka Dabba	Stanley Fernandes	Filmfare Special Award
2014	Hawaa Hawaai	Arjun Harishchand Waghmare	

== Awards ==
- 2011: Filmfare Special Award for Stanley Ka Dabba (Certificate)
- 2011: National Film Award for Best Child Artist for Stanley Ka Dabba
- Screen Award - best child actor 2011
- Big Star Award - best child Actor 2011
- Best Actor at the Shlingel Film Festival in Germany 2011
- The Colours New Talent Award - Best Child Talent 2011
