= Amol Gole =

Indian cinematographer (born 1979)

- Born: Amol Gole; 2 January 1979 (age 47); Mumbai, Maharashtra, India
- Occupations: Cinematographer, Photographer, Producer
- Years active: 2003–present
- Spouse: Swati Shinde Gole

Amol Gole is an Indian cinematographer who shot Hindi films like Stanley Ka Dabba, Hawaa Hawaai, Elizabeth Ekadashi, Touring Talkies, Investment etc. He debuted as an Independent cinematographer with the film Stanley Ka Dabba directed by Amol Gupte. As cinematographer Amol used a still DSLR camera, Canon's 7D, to make sure the kids (who were shot without missing school, only on Saturdays and during vacation-time) could be themselves, free and feckless and open to constant improvisation. The results are striking, a film that feels both stunningly real and yet beautifully textured, color-corrected immaculately enough to look markedly un-digital on the big screen. Besides feature films, he has also shot many ad films, documentaries and short films.

Gole has also shot the internationally acclaimed documentary -- 'Nero's Guests' based on Journalist Palagummi Sainath's work in Vidarbha on issues related to the agrarian crisis.

Marathi film 'Gajaar' has become the first film in the history of Marathi Cinema to be shot entirely using a digital camera. The film, which has been shot live on the annual pilgrimage of Saint Dnyaneshwar from Alandi in Pune to Pandharpur in Solapur, has been shot on a Canon 7D, a digital SLR camera.

== Personal life ==
Amol has studied from Sir J. J. School of Commercial Arts, Mumbai. He is married to Swati Shinde Gole. She is a senior journalist and works with Times of India as Deputy Editor. Amol and Swati have a son.

== Filmography ==
As Director

Nashibvaan ( film ) (2019)

Sumi (2020 film) Best Child National Award (2021)

=== As producer ===
- Rangaa Patangaa (2016)

=== As Cinematographer ===
- Rangaa Patangaa (Released 1 April 2016)
- Stanley Ka Dabba (2011)
- Hawa Hawai (2014)
- Elizabeth Ekadashi (2014)
- The Bright Day (2015)
- Whisky Is Risky (2014)
- Mokssh (2013)
- Investment (2013)
- Ha Bharat Maza (2012)
- Gajaar: Journey of the Soul (2012)
- Nero's Guests (Documentary) (2012)
- Nashibvaan ( film ) (2019)
- Ashi Hi Aashiqui ( film ) (2019)
- Touring Talkies

== Awards ==
- Sant Tukaram " Best International Marathi Film Award for the Rangaa Patangaa at PIFF - Pune International Film Festival, 2016
- Best Cinematographer' for Elizabeth Ekadashi at PIFF - Pune International Film Festival, 2015
- Best rural film at Maharashtra state film awards 2016.
