= Every child is special =

The phrase "every child is special" may refer to:

- Taare Zameen Par, a Hindi film
- a slogan of Easter Seals
- a monologue on the album It's Bad for Ya by comedian George Carlin

== See also ==
- Taare Zameen Par (disambiguation)
