= Sitaare Zameen Par (soundtrack) =

Soundtrack album by Shankar–Ehsaan–Loy
- Released: 11 June 2025
- Recorded: 2024–2025
- Studios: Purple Haze Studios, Mumbai; Lambodara Studios, Navi Mumbai
- Genre: Feature film soundtrack
- Length: 14:29
- Language: Hindi
- Label: Zee Music Company

Shankar–Ehsaan–Loy chronology
Sangeet Manapmaan (2024)	Sitaare Zameen Par (2025)	Chatha Pacha: The Ring of Rowdies (2025)
External audio
- Sitaare Zameen Par – Full Album on YouTube

Singles from Sitaare Zameen Par
- 1. "Good for Nothing" Released: 22 May 2025; 2. "Sar Aankhon Pe Mere" Released: 29 June 2025; 3. "Sitaare Zameen Par (Title Track)" Released: 5 June 2025

Sitaare Zameen Par is the soundtrack album to the 2025 film of the same name directed by R. S. Prasanna, and produced by Aamir Khan who also starred in the lead role alongside Genelia D'Souza; it is a spiritual sequel to Khan's Taare Zameen Par (2007), and a remake of the Spanish film Champions (2018). The film's soundtrack features four songs composed by Shankar–Ehsaan–Loy with lyrics written by Amitabh Bhattacharya and released through Zee Music Company on 11 June 2025.

== Background ==
Shankar–Ehsaan–Loy composed the original songs with lyrics written by Amitabh Bhattacharya, while Ram Sampath composed the background score. The trio had previously composed for Taare Zameen Par, and unlike the film, which accompanied melancholic music, Shankar Mahadevan added that the music was "happy, fun and celebratory" providing a tongue-in-cheek smile while listening to the songs, as the film is a "completely different take on emotions with people with down syndrome". The trio worked on the film's music at Khan's home in Panchgani.

== Release ==
The film featured four songs, with all of them being released as singles. The first song, "Good for Nothing" performed by Shankar Mahadevan and Bhattacharya, was released as a single on 22 May 2025. Netizens noted that the song is a revamped version of "Papa Kehte Hain" from Qayamat Se Qayamat Tak (1988). Subsequently, the second song "Sar Aankhon Pe Mere" performed by Arijit Singh and Shariva Parulkar was released on 29 May. The title track was released as the third song on 5 June. The last song, "Shubh Mangalam" was released along with the soundtrack album by Zee Music Company on 11 June; the music video released five days later.

== Track listing ==
No.	Title	Singer(s)	Length
1.	"Good for Nothing"	Shankar Mahadevan, Amitabh Bhattacharya	3:28
2.	"Sar Aankhon Pe Mere"	Arijit Singh, Shariva Parulkar	4:05
3.	"Sitaare Zameen Par" (Title Track)	Shankar Mahadevan, Siddharth Mahadevan, Divya Kumar	3:59
4.	"Shubh Mangalam"	Shankar Mahadevan, Amitabh Bhattacharya	2:57
Total length:			14:29

== Critical reception ==
Rishabh Suri of Hindustan Times wrote "The music by Shankar-Ehsaan-Loy is peppy and goes with the film. Don't expect as memorable a soundtrack as Taare Zameen Par, and you won't be disappointed." Anupama Chopra of The Hollywood Reporter wrote "Shankar Ehsaan Loy's effervescent title track adds buoyancy to the narrative." Bollywood Hungama-based critic wrote "Shankar-Ehsaan-Loy's music is one of the weakest parts of the film. But they are well-woven into the narrative. The title track and 'Good For Nothing' work to some extent. 'Shubh Mangalam' is worth watching for the visuals. 'Sar Aankhon Pe Mere' is forgettable. Ram Sampath's background score is in sync with the film’s mood." Murtuza Iqbal of The Free Press Journal stated "In one department, the film fails to impress is the music. The songs in the movie don't leave a strong mark. We expected more from Shankar Ehsaan Loy."

== Personnel ==
Credits adapted from Zee Music Company:

- All songs composed, arranged and produced by: Shankar–Ehsaan–Loy
- Chorus: Shankar Mahadevan, Shariva Parulkar, Prakriti Giri, Ruhdabeh Vazifdar, Urgen Yolmo, Ravee Mishrra, Arsh Mohammed, Latesh Puujari, Jaden Mascarenhas, Aseem Trivedi
- Guitar and banjo: Neil Mukherjee
- Bass: Sheldon D'Silva
- Brass: Abhay Sharma, Ramon Ibrahim, Robin Fargose, Walter Dias, Enrico Rodrigues
- Violin: Dielle Braganza
- Recorded at: Purple Haze Studios (Mumbai), Lambodara Studios (Navi Mumbai)
- Recording engineers: Abhay Rumde, Ameya Mategaonkar
- Recording assistant: Pathin Bhowmick
- Mixed by: Vijay Benegal at Lambodara Studios, Navi Mumbai
- Mastered by: Donal Whelan at Hafod Mastering, Wales
- Studio manager: Shirin Sukheswala
