= List of accolades received by Dil To Pagal Hai =

Dil To Pagal Hai awards and nominations
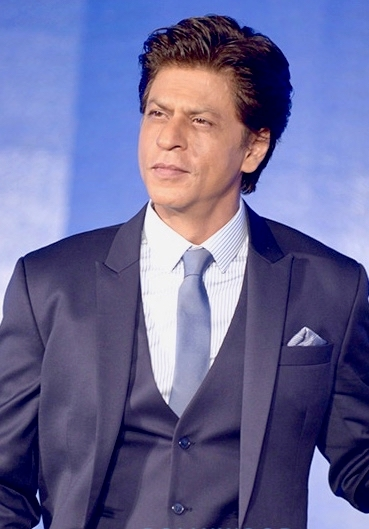
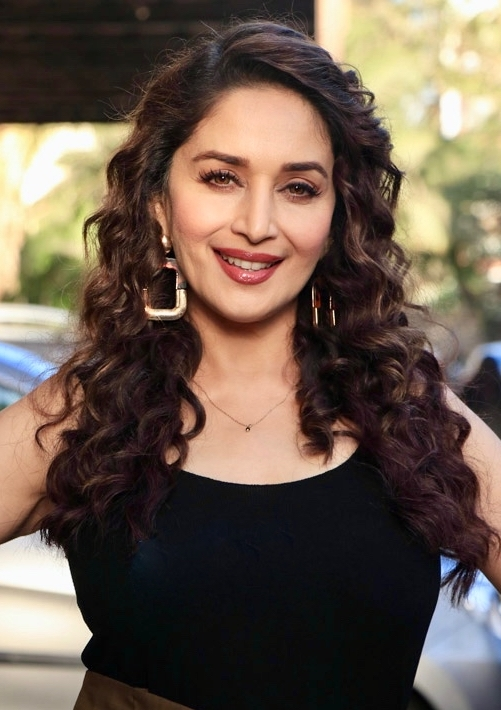
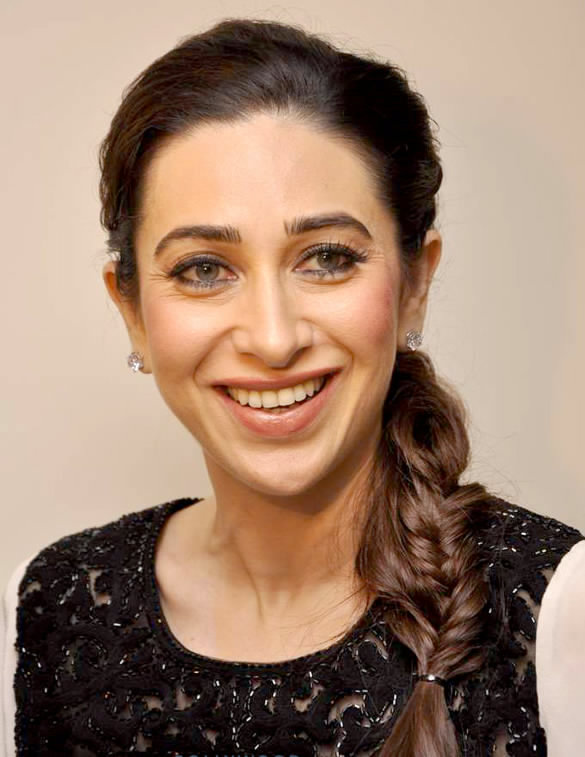
- Shah Rukh Khan, Madhuri Dixit, and Karisma Kapoor garnered several accolades for their performances in Dil To Pagal Hai
Awards and nominations
Award	Wins	Nominations
Filmfare Awards	7	11
National Film Awards	3	3
Screen Awards	9	11
Zee Cine Awards	10	25

Totals (Note: Certain award groups do not simply award one winner. They acknowledge several different recipients, have runners-up, and have third place. Since this is a specific recognition and is different from losing an award, runner-up mentions are considered wins in this award tally. For simplification and to avoid errors, each award in this list has been presumed to have had a prior nomination.)
- Wins: 23
- Nominations: 47

Dil To Pagal Hai (transl. The Heart is Crazy) is a 1997 Indian Hindi-language musical romantic film that was co-written, directed, and co-produced by Yash Chopra. It stars Shah Rukh Khan as the choreographer Rahul, and Madhuri Dixit and Karisma Kapoor as the dancers Pooja and Nisha, respectively. The film is about the three's lives as members of a musical troupe, and follows the competition between Pooja and Nisha for Rahul's love. The soundtrack of the film was composed by Uttam Singh, while the lyrics were written by Anand Bakshi. The film was shot by Manmohan Singh on the sets designed by Sharmishta Roy, and was edited by V. Karnik.

Dil To Pagal Hai opened at theatres on 31 October 1997 and emerged as the year's highest-grossing Indian film, grossing over ₹710 million (US$8.4 million). Film reviewers however received it with a mixed-to-negative reception, criticising its writing while praising the actors' performances and its songs. The film received 23 awards out of 49 nominations; the direction, performances of the cast, music, choreography, and art direction met with the most attention from various award groups.

Dil To Pagal Hai won three trophies at the 45th National Film Awards, including Best Popular Film Providing Wholesome Entertainment and Best Supporting Actress (Kapoor). At the 43rd Filmfare Awards, the film fetched a total of eight awards, including Best Film, Best Actor (Khan), Best Actress (Dixit), and Best Supporting Actress (Kapoor), out of eleven nominations, including Best Director (Chopra) and Best Supporting Actor (Akshay Kumar). At the 4th Screen Awards, it was nominated for eight categories, which include those for Best Actor (Khan) and Best Supporting Actress (Kapoor), and had two wins. The film also received ten awards at the 1st Zee Cine Awards, including Best Film, Best Actor – Male (Khan), Best Actor – Female (Dixit), and Best Actor in a Supporting Role – Female (Kapoor).

== Awards and nominations ==
Accolades received by Dil To Pagal Hai
Award	Date of ceremony (Note: Date is linked to the article about the awards held that year, wherever possible.)	Category	Recipient(s)	Result	Ref.
Filmfare Awards	31 January 1998	Best Film	Dil To Pagal Hai	Won	
Filmfare Awards	31 January 1998	Best Director	Yash Chopra	Nominated	
Filmfare Awards	31 January 1998	Best Actor	Shah Rukh Khan	Won	
Filmfare Awards	31 January 1998	Best Actress	Madhuri Dixit	Won	
Filmfare Awards	31 January 1998	Best Supporting Actor	Akshay Kumar	Nominated	
Filmfare Awards	31 January 1998	Best Supporting Actress	Karisma Kapoor	Won	
Filmfare Awards	31 January 1998	Best Music Director	Uttam Singh	Won	
Filmfare Awards	31 January 1998	Best Lyricist	Anand Bakshi for "Bholi Si Surat"	Nominated	
Filmfare Awards	31 January 1998	Best Male Playback Singer	Udit Narayan for "Dil To Pagal Hai"	Nominated	
Filmfare Awards	31 January 1998	Best Dialogue	Aditya Chopra	Won	
Filmfare Awards	31 January 1998	Best Art Direction	Sharmishta Roy	Won	
National Film Awards	10 July 1998	Best Popular Film Providing Wholesome Entertainment	Dil To Pagal Hai	Won	
National Film Awards	10 July 1998	Best Supporting Actress	Karisma Kapoor	Won	
National Film Awards	10 July 1998	Best Choreography	Shiamak Davar	Won	
Screen Awards	17 January 1998	Best Actor	Shah Rukh Khan	Nominated	
Screen Awards	17 January 1998	Best Supporting Actress	Karisma Kapoor	Nominated	
Screen Awards	17 January 1998	Best Music Director	Uttam Singh	Nominated	
Screen Awards	17 January 1998	Best Male Playback Singer	Udit Narayan for "Dil To Pagal Hai"	Nominated	
Screen Awards	17 January 1998	Best Female Playback Singer	Asha Bhosle for "Le Gayi"	Nominated	
Screen Awards	17 January 1998	Best Cinematography	Manmohan Singh	Nominated	
Screen Awards	17 January 1998	Best Art Direction	Sharmishta Roy	Won	
Screen Awards	17 January 1998	Best Choreography	Shiamak Davar	Won	
Zee Cine Awards	14 March 1998	Best Film	Dil To Pagal Hai	Won	
Zee Cine Awards	14 March 1998	Best Director	Yash Chopra	Nominated	
Zee Cine Awards	14 March 1998	Best Actor – Male	Shah Rukh Khan	Won	
Zee Cine Awards	14 March 1998	Best Actor – Female	Madhuri Dixit	Won	
Zee Cine Awards	14 March 1998	Best Actor – Female	Karisma Kapoor	Nominated	
Zee Cine Awards	14 March 1998	Best Actor in a Supporting Role – Female	Karisma Kapoor	Won	
Zee Cine Awards	14 March 1998	Best Actor in a Supporting Role – Female	Farida Jalal	Nominated	
Zee Cine Awards	14 March 1998	Best Story	Pamela Chopra	Nominated	
Zee Cine Awards	14 March 1998	Best Screenplay	Aditya Chopra, Pamela Chopra, Tanuja Chandra, Yash Chopra	Nominated	
Zee Cine Awards	14 March 1998	Best Dialogue	Aditya Chopra	Nominated	
Zee Cine Awards	14 March 1998	Best Art Direction	Sharmishta Roy	Won	
Zee Cine Awards	14 March 1998	Best Cinematography	Manmohan Singh	Won	
Zee Cine Awards	14 March 1998	Best Costume Design	Manish Malhotra	Nominated	
Zee Cine Awards	14 March 1998	Best Editing	V. Karnik	Nominated	
Zee Cine Awards	14 March 1998	Best Music Director	Uttam Singh	Won	
Zee Cine Awards	14 March 1998	Best Background Score	Uttam Singh	Nominated	
Zee Cine Awards	14 March 1998	Best Lyricist	Anand Bakshi for "Dil To Pagal Hai"	Nominated	
Zee Cine Awards	14 March 1998	Best Lyricist	Anand Bakshi for "Bholi Si Surat"	Nominated	
Zee Cine Awards	14 March 1998	Best Playback Singer – Male	Udit Narayan for "Bholi Si Surat"	Nominated	
Zee Cine Awards	14 March 1998	Best Playback Singer – Female	Lata Mangeshkar for "Are Re Are Ye Kya Hua"	Nominated	
Zee Cine Awards	14 March 1998	Best Playback Singer – Female	Lata Mangeshkar for "Dil To Pagal Hai"	Won	
Zee Cine Awards	14 March 1998	Best Playback Singer – Female	Asha Bhosle for "Le Gayi"	Nominated	
Zee Cine Awards	14 March 1998	Best Choreography	Shiamak Davar	Won	
Zee Cine Awards	14 March 1998	Best Special Effects (Visual)	Sai Prasad	Won	
Zee Cine Awards	14 March 1998	Best Sound Recording	Anuj Mathur	Nominated	
