= Hukus Bukus =

2023 Indian Hindi film

- Theatrical release poster
- Directed by: Vinay Bhardwaj; Saumitra Singh
- Written by: Ranjit Singh Mashiana
- Screenplay by: Vipul Patel; Jagtar Singh Kalwana
- Produced by: Vinay Bhardwaj; Ravina Thakur
- Starring: Darsheel Safary; Arun Govil; Sajjad Delafrooz; Gautam Singh Vig; Mir Sarwar
- Cinematography: Hemant Gulshan Chauhan
- Edited by: Devendra Murdeshwar
- Music by: Songs: Puneet Dixit; Background Score: Tuhin K. Biswas
- Production company: Shining Sun Studios
- Distributed by: PVR INOX Pictures
- Release date: 3 November 2023
- Country: India
- Language: Hindi

Hukus Bukus is a 2023 Indian Hindi-language sport drama film directed by Vinay Bhardwaj. The film stars Darsheel Safary, Arun Govil, Sajjad Delafrooz, Gautam Vij and Mir Sarwar. Darsheel Safary has played the role of fan of cricketer Sachin Tendulkar.

Set in Kashmir in 1999, the title of the film is derived from the popular Kashmiri folk song of the same name. Hukus Bukus was released in theatres on 3 November 2023.

== Cast ==
- Darsheel Safary as Arjun
- Arun Govil as Pandit Radheshayam
- Sajjad Delafrooz as MLA Iqbal Qureshi
- Gautam Vig as Vikram Rathi
- Mir Sarwar as Coach Khalid
- Vansh Sayani as Rohan
- Naisha Khanna
- Abhishek Garg
- Abir Beri

== Music ==
Lyrics of the song was written by Sanjay Masoomm.

Track No	Song	Singer	Composer
1	"Jeet Ka Jaikara"	Puneet Dixit	Puneet Dixit
