= Ratnakar Matkari =

Indian author (1938–2020)

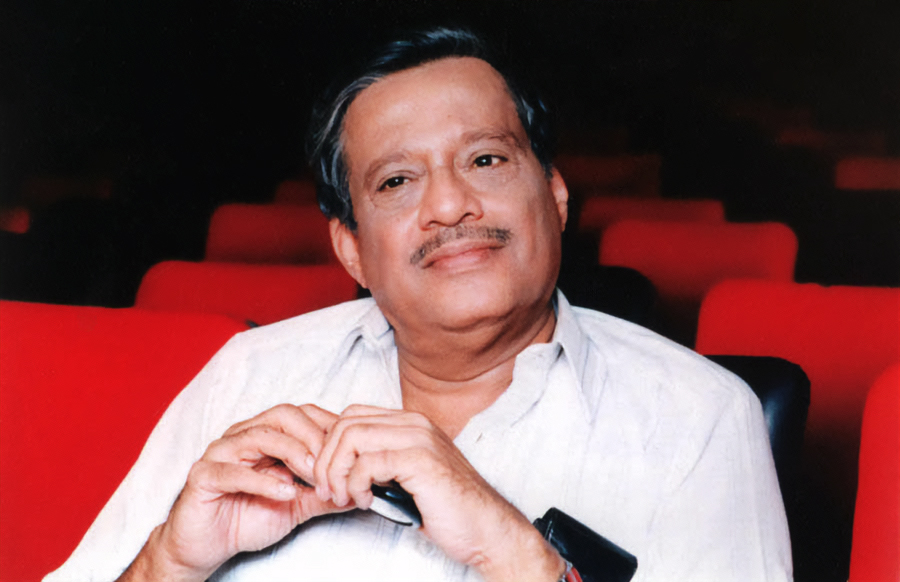
- In 2004
- Born: 17 November 1938; Mumbai, British Raj
- Died: 17 May 2020 (aged 81); Mumbai, India
- Occupations: Producer, writer, director
- Years active: 1955–2019

Ratnakar Ramkrushna Matkari (17 November 1938 – 17 May 2020) was a Marathi writer, a movie and play producer/director, and a self-taught artist from Maharashtra, India.

== Life ==
Matkari was born on 17 November 1938 in Mumbai. After earning a degree in economics from Mumbai University in 1958, he worked at the Bank of India for the next twenty years. Since 1978, he devoted his time exclusively to writing & production/direction of movies and plays. He was married to artist Pratibha Matkari. He died on 17 May 2020 in Mumbai, having tested positive for COVID-19 the week before during the COVID-19 pandemic in India.

== Literary career ==
Matkari's first work, the one-act play Wedi Manase (वेडी माणसे), was presented in 1955 on All India Radio in Mumbai. His play Pahuni (पाहुणी) was presented the next year at another venue.

Matkari worked as a columnist for newspapers and magazines in the 1970s. He wrote the column Soneri Savalya (सोनेरी सावल्या) in Apale Mahanagar (आपले महानगर) for four years.

Matkari's 98 works thus far include 33 plays, 8 collections of his one-act plays, 18 books of his short stories, 3 novels, a book of poems for children, and 14 plays and three collections of plays for children. His works include Gudha Katha (गूढकथा) --mysteries—for adults which maintain realism. Matkari wrote a few plays in Indian languages other than Marathi.

Ratnakar Matkari's book named "Darkness" was translated from Marathi to English.

Many of Matkari's novels have been adapted for the stage.

His plays include:

- Dubhang (दुभंग)
- Aranyak (आरण्यक)
- Sate Lote (साटेलोटे)
- Ashwamedh (अश्वमेध)
- Brahmahatya (ब्रह्महत्या)
- Prema Kahani (प्रेमकहाणी)
- Lokakatha 78 (लोककथा ७८)
- Khol Khol Pani (खोल खोल पाणी)
- Jawai Majha Bhala (जावई माझा भला)
- Ghar Tighanche Hawe (घर तिघांचे हवे)
- Char Diwas Premache (चार दिवस प्रेमाचे)
- Vinashakadun Vinashakade (विनाशाकडून विनाशाकडे)

Matkari's plays for children include:

- Albatya Galbatya (अलबत्या गलबत्या)
- Nimma Shimma Rakshas (निम्माशिम्मा राक्षस)
- Achat Gawachi Aphat Mavashi (अचाटगावची अफाट मावशी)

The musical play Char Diwas Premache (चार दिवस प्रेमाचे) has been presented to the public more than 850 times, and its translated versions in Hindi and Gujarati have also been presented. His play "Lokakatha 78" (लोककथा ७८) was presented in Marathi and Hindi.

== Theatrical career ==
Matkari acted in his own plays like Prem Kahani", Vinashakadun Vinashakade", "Lokakatha 78", and Sate Lote. He also presented popular one man shows like Adbhutachya Rajyat (अद्भुताच्या राज्यात).

Matkari notably promoted art house theatre. Thus, in 1972, he established Sootradhar (सूत्रधार), an institution which has produced thus far 12 art house plays.

Besides producing and directing plays for adults, Matkari notably established in 1962 Bal Natya Sanstha (बालनाट्यसंस्था), which has thus far produced 22 plays for children, most of them being one-act plays. He performed as an actor in many of these plays, including Sangati (सांगाती), "Sharvari (शर्वरी), "Chitratale Ghar" (चित्रातले घर), and "Tumachi Goshta (तुमची गोष्ट). NIKHARE THE NEW PLAY

== Filmography ==
- Investment (2013) Director.

== Other activities ==
Matkari presented a number of stage shows involving presentations of stories in front of Marathi audiences in India, Maskat, and, in 1986, the US. In 1999, he presented for different institutions 51 readings of the essay Tumhi Tithe Asayala Have (तुम्ही तिथे असायला हवे), which was a Marathi translation of Arundhati Roy's English essay titled Greater Common Good.

Matkari directed a few TV serials. He presented on TV channel Mumbai Doordarshan 13 episodes of Sharadache Chandane (शरदाचे चांदणे), which comprised interviews of some prominent Marathi writers. During 1976–78, he presented 25 monthly shows of Gajara (गजरा), also on Mumbai Doordarshan.

For some years, Matkari served as a member of the advisory committee of All India Radio, and as a member of the film scrutinising committee during 1988–91.

He presided over Nirbhay Bano (निर्भय बनो) movement in 1995, Konkan Marathi Sahitya Sammelan, Mumbai branch in 2001, and Balkumar Sahitya Sammelan in Pune, also in 2001.

As an artist, Matkari prepared drawings for some stage crafts and drapery, and oil paintings for Narmada Andolan (नर्मदा आंदोलन). He designed covers of a few books.

== Accolades ==
During 1983–84, Matkari received a two-year scholarship from the Directorate of Culture and Education of Government of India for being an artist with social awareness.

- Jyotsna Bhole Award from Akhil Bharatiya Natya Parishad (1978) (for his work for children's stage)
- 'Natya Darpan Nana Oak Award (for being an all-round artist)
- Deval Award from Akhil Bharatiya Natya Parishad (1985)
- The Best Playwright Award from Atre Foundation (1985)
- Maharashtra State Government's Gadkari Award (1995) (for best playwright)
- Gangadhar Gadgil Award (1997)
- S. L. Gadre Matoshri Award (1998)
- Natyavrati Award (1999)
- V. V. Shirwadkar Award for writing plays (2002)
- Sangeet Natak Akademi Award (2003–04)
