= Stanley Ka Dabba =

- Theatrical release poster
- Directed by: Amole Gupte
- Story by: Amole Gupte
- Produced by: Amole Gupte
- Starring: Divya Dutta; Partho Gupte; Divya Jagdale; Raj Zutshi; Amole Gupte
- Cinematography: Amol Gole
- Edited by: Deepa Bhatia
- Music by: Hitesh Sonik; Amole Gupte
- Production company: Amole Gupte Cinema
- Distributed by: Fox Star Studios
- Release date: 13 May 2011
- Running time: 96 minutes
- Country: India
- Language: Hindi
- Budget: ₹4.5 crore
- Box office: ₹7.63 crore

Stanley Ka Dabba (transl. Stanley's lunchbox) is a 2011 Hindi-language comedy drama film written, directed and produced by Amole Gupte, starring Divya Dutta, Partho Gupte (son of Amole Gupte), Divya Jagdale, Raj Zutshi, and Amole Gupte. The film was released on 13 May 2011.

== Plot ==
Stanley (Partho Gupte) is a fourth grader at Holy Family School in Mumbai and is very popular among his friends. He is talented and well-liked by his peers. The English teacher, Ms. Rosy (Divya Dutta), is particularly impressed with his creativity, wit, and humour. Stanley is shown with a bruised face in the opening scene of the movie. On being questioned about it by Ms. Rosy, he concocts an elaborate story, much to her amusement. His humorous essays and offhand poem recitations make him her favourite in class. However, his imagination is not always rewarded; his science teacher (Divya Jagdale) rebukes his attempt at constructing a lighthouse as part of the class project since it does not adhere to the topics covered in class.

It is shown early on that he doesn't bring his lunch box or 'dabba' to school, unlike all his other classmates. Verma (Amole Gupte) is a ravenous Hindi teacher, a phagomaniac who does not bring his own dabba either but lusts after everyone else's, also stealing food on occasion. The kids at school nicknamed him 'Khadoos' (cantankerous person). He has a poor reputation among his peers for his mindless and inconsiderate gluttony. He particularly eyes the dabba of one of Stanley's friends and shamelessly joins the group in class as soon as the lunch bell goes off to gorge on their food. A lot of his class time is spent discussing what his students brought for lunch.

One day, he ends up coming late during lunchbreak and misses out on eating what he had earlier hoped to eat from the children's dabbas. Upon realising that the food in question was shared with Stanley, Khadoos berates him for not getting his own dabba. Stanley senses Khadoos' hostility towards him and avoids eating from his friends' dabbas thereafter, telling them every day during lunch break that he is going home to enjoy a hot meal prepared by his mother. His friends catch his bluff soon after when they find him loitering around the school during lunch break. When confronted, Stanley tells them that there is no one to cook for him until his parents get back from Delhi. Eager to help their hungry friend out, Stanley's friends start hiding from Khadoos during lunch break while sharing their dabbas with Stanley. Chagrined, Khadoos start hunting for them arduously during lunch break every day. He catches hold of them eventually on the terrace, empty dabbas in tow. Upon realising that the group shared their lunches with Stanley again, he menacingly threatens Stanley to either bring his own dabba or stop coming to school. Stanley obliges and stops coming to school.

In this time, Stanley's friends come to know of an inter-school concert that they think he would be a perfect fit for. However, since he is debarred from school by Khadoos, Stanley remains sceptical about his chances. He secretly starts attending practice sessions for the concert and begins learning the dance steps and song lyrics by himself. Soon after, he is spotted practicing by one of the organizers of the concert. His talent is recognised and he is immediately included in the troupe. In the meantime, Stanley's absence is felt by his teachers and friends, who finally spill the beans to Ms. Rosy about the reason behind his nonattendance. Aghast and disgusted, Ms. Rosy confronts Khadoos in front of other staff members, asking him to "have some shame" since Stanley "is just a child." Khadoos begins realising his folly.

One fine day, Stanley brings his own dabba to school. He offers it to Khadoos on a platter and asks him for permission to come back to school. Guilt-ridden and shame-faced, Khadoos resigns from his post. He apologises to Stanley in a handwritten letter and promises to never return.

Meanwhile, the inter-school concert is attended by the entire staff of Holy Family, all of whom appreciate Stanley's performance. Ms. Rosy congratulates Stanley after the concert and offers him a ride home. However, he refuses, saying that his mother is waiting for him in her car. The school's principal (Rahul Singh) later drops Stanley home, which we realise isn't "home" but the restaurant at which he works. An orphan, Stanley, is frequently physically abused by the proprietor of the restaurant (his own uncle, Shashank Shende), leaving him badly bruised. He hits Stanley in the face for remaining absent from work for the majority of the day. A cook at the restaurant, Akram, empathises with Stanley and promises to pack leftovers at the restaurant into his 'dabba' every day, without his uncle's knowledge. Stanley and Akram stay back and clean the place up for the night. The scene ends with Stanley lighting a candle next to a photograph of his parents before going to bed. The next day onward, Stanley brings his own dabba to school and shares it with everyone while regaling them with details about how his mother prepared everything.

== Cast ==
- Partho Gupte as Stanley Fernandes
- Divya Dutta as Rosy Miss (English Teacher)
- Divya Jagdale as Mrs. Iyer (Science Teacher)
- Raj Zutshi as Rajendranath Zutshi (History Teacher)
- Aditya Lakhia as Parshu (Peon)
- Rahul Singh as the Principal
- Shiv Kumar Subramaniam as a Math Teacher
- Kadambari Shantshree as an Art Teacher
- Amole Gupte as Babubhai Verma a.k.a. Khadoos (Hindi Teacher)
- Shashank Shende as Restaurant Owner (Stanley's uncle)
- Vidyut Jammwal as Zoyaab (Rosy Miss's fiancée)
- Numaan Shaikh as Aman Mehra (Stanley's friend)
- Jitendra Rai as Akram

== Production ==
After the success of Taare Zameen Par Amole Gupte wanted to make a small, non-mainstream film. He borrowed money from friends and began shooting with a five-man crew in a Mumbai school. The crew shot during four-hour workshops every Saturday for a year and a half to capture all the scenes they needed. Shot using a Canon EOS 7D, the film used 170 child actors in total. After the film was completed, Gupte showed it to Karan Johar and he helped him to sign a distribution deal with Fox Star Studios.

== Soundtrack ==
The music of the film is composed by Hitesh Sonik and Amole Gupte. Lyrics are penned by Amole Gupte.

=== Track listing ===
All lyrics are written by Amole Gupte.

No.	Title	Music	Singer(s)	Length
1.	"Dabba!"	Hitesh Sonik	Sukhwinder Singh	4:20
2.	"Jhoola Jhool"	Amole Gupte	Hamsika Iyer	2:41
3.	"Life Bahot Simple Hai"	Hitesh Sonik	Shaan	4:34
4.	"Nanhi Si Jaan"	Hitesh Sonik	Shankar Mahadevan	5:39
5.	"Tere Andar Bhi Kahin"	Hitesh Sonik	Vishal Dadlani	5:38
6.	"Tere Andar Bhi Kahin – Aditya Rox"	Hitesh Sonik	Aditya Chakravarty	1:44
7.	"Thirsty – Stanley's Theme"			2:50

== Critical reception ==
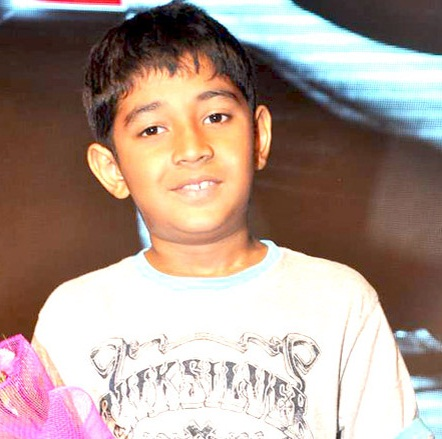
Partho Gupte – Child protagonist of the film

Stanley Ka Dabba attracted positive reviews from critics across India. Raja Sen of Rediff.com gave it a rating of 5 stars out of 5 stating that it was the "Best, purest film to come out of Hindi cinema in a while". Rajeev Masand of CNN-IBN gave it a rating of 4/5 calling it "heartwarming". Anupama Chopra of NDTV said, "I recommend that you make time for the film. It has an inherent sweetness and honesty that will stay with you long after the film is over" and gave it 3.5 out of 5 stars. Pratim D. Gupta of The Telegraph gave two thumbs up to Stanley Ka Dabba calling it "a trip back to the innocence and goodness of childhood". Gupta wrote "because if there's one thing this movie reminds you, it is: Life is like Stanley ka dabba... you never know what you’re gonna get". Entertainment portal FilmiTadka gave it 3.5 out of five stars and in a statement wrote – "Stanley Ka Dabba is definitely not as opulent as Taare Zameen Par, but the director manages to keep the film on the right track, as an audience I found myself laughing, crying and feeling for the kids. It's a simple story which definitely reminds one about his/her school days". Nikhat Kazmi of Times of India wrote "Don't miss this rich and nuanced soul curry for both, the young and adult heart", giving SKD once again 3.5 out of 5 stars.

== Box office ==
The film grossed an estimated ₹7.63 crore (US$790,000) at the box office, against a budget of ₹4.5 crore (US$470,000).

== Accolades ==
Award Ceremony	Category	Recipient	Result	Ref.(s)
4th Mirchi Music Awards	Upcoming Music Composer of The Year	Hitesh Sonik - "Life Bahot Simple Hai"	Nominated	
4th Mirchi Music Awards	Upcoming Lyricist of The Year	Amol Gupte - "Life Bahot Simple Hai"	Nominated	
