= Gajaar: Journey of the Soul =

- DVD cover
- Directed by: Ajit Bhairavkar
- Written by: Ajit Bhairavkar
- Produced by: Sunil Khosla; Vibha Dutta Khosla
- Starring: Chinmay Mandlekar; Umesh Jagtap; Sukhada Yash; Edward Sonnenblick
- Cinematography: Amol Gole
- Music by: Shailendra Barve
- Production companies: Boutique Cinema Private limited Anuradha Gole Story Board Films
- Release date: 6 May 2011
- Running time: 124 minutes
- Country: India
- Language: Marathi

Gajaar: Journey of the Soul is a 2011 Indian Marathi-language drama film directed by Ajit Bhairavkar and produced by Sunil khosla. The film revolves around film director Parth (Chinmay Mandlekar) and captures the devotional movements of Wari.

Gajar is the first film in the history of Marathi cinema to be shot entirely using digital cameras.

== Plot ==
A passionate film director is determined to capture the pilgrimage sites of Pandharpur Wari where lakhs of devotees experience spiritual bliss as they walk all the way to meet their beloved Lord Vithoba.

== Cast ==
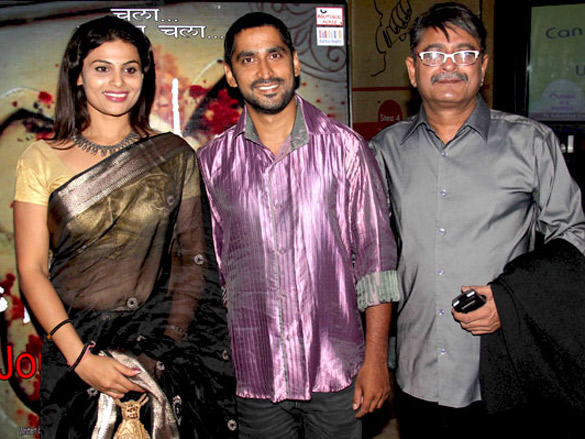
Sukhada Yash, Chinmay Mandlekar and Sunil Khosla promoting 'Gajaar'

- Chinmay Mandlekar as Parth
- Sukhada Yash as Geetali
- Umesh Jagtap as Asurba
- Edward Sonnenblick as Eric
- Sanjeev Chopra as Producer Kapoor
- Suhas Sirsat as Audya

== Production ==
=== Filming ===
Gajaar was shot in some pilgrimage centers of Maharashtra like Padharpur, Pune, Alandi due to its 'Wari' based story.
