= Taare Zameen Par (soundtrack) =

Taare Zameen Par (Original Motion Picture Soundtrack)

Soundtrack album by Shankar–Ehsaan–Loy
- Released: 5 November 2007
- Recorded: 2007
- Studio: Anand, Mumbai, India
- Genre: Feature film soundtrack
- Length: 38:45
- Label: T-Series, Universal Music Japan
- Producer: Shankar–Ehsaan–Loy

Shankar–Ehsaan–Loy chronology
Heyy Babyy (2007)	Taare Zameen Par (Original Motion Picture Soundtrack) (2007)	Thoda Pyaar Thoda Magic (2008)

Taare Zameen Par (Original Motion Picture Soundtrack) is the soundtrack to the 2007 psychological drama film of the same name produced and directed by Aamir Khan, who also stars alongside Darsheel Safary, Tanay Chheda, Vipin Sharma and Tisca Chopra. The soundtrack and musical score is composed by Shankar–Ehsaan–Loy and lyrics written by Prasoon Joshi, with the exception of one of the songs composed by Shailendra Barve and written by Amole Gupte, the film's co-director. The album featuring eight songs was released by T-Series on 5 November 2007.

== Development ==
According to Shankar Mahadevan, the trio found it challenging on getting the right sound in place, so that it would stick to the film's spirit while composing and should not "camouflage or compromise on the sound with arrangements or spicing up the affairs with any 'jhinchaak' stuff." Comparing with other films, Taare Zameen Par required melody to hold center stage, where "there is a different level of energy that you have to bring in composing for such different soundtrack as we had to be subdued yet effective".

Upon Khan's insistence, Mahadevan performed vocals for two of the tracks—the title track and "Maa"—which happened as Khan listened to the rough cut of the tracks and felt that his vocals would be apt for the soulful feel of the compositions. The song "Bheja Kum" is a dialogue based on the film rather than a conventional song; the track was performed by nine artists including Khan and Kiran Rao, who would speak a few words highlighting the tension Ishaan goes through. Mahadevan added that the song had a funny yet realistic side to it, which led the trio enjoyed while recording the song.

Instead of scoring the film at his studio, the music was recorded at Khan's home in Panchgani to have a clear mindset and instructed on the timing, scope and other aspects. The final version was however recorded at Anand Recording Studios in Mumbai. Khan wanted to refrain from using pre-planned techniques of recording the music, and insisted on recording the film score live, a technique which Hindi film musicians did decades ago.

== Reception ==
"We were so moved when we were given the narration of the film. We knew instantly that we had to come up with a kind of score that gels well with the theme and spirit of the film. I am happy that the music has caught on with audience acknowledging this aspect of the soundtrack."
– Shankar Mahadevan

Joginder Tuteja of Bollywood Hungama praised the variety of genres present in the soundtrack and the lack of remixes. He gave it an overall rating of 3.5 out of 5 stars, calling it a "zero compromise album" that "stays true to the film's spirit". Sukanya Verma of Rediff.com gave the soundtrack a score of 3 out of 5, commenting, "Taare Zameen Par isn't your regular soundtrack about fluttering hearts and sleepless nights. What makes these delicate and whimsical creations special is their underlying innocence."

Karthik Srinivasan of Milliblog wrote "The trio revel in Aamir's sensibilities to produce a refined soundtrack for adults". Kushal Gopalka of Mint rated 3.5 out of 5 stating "With their thoroughly positive music score for this movie, the music direction trio, Shankar-Ehsaan-Loy, have once again proven their supremacy among Bollywood's combo music makers." Khalid Mohamed of Hindustan Times wrote "As for the music score, it's remarkable essentially for the moving Maa and Mera jahaan composed by Shankar-Ehsaan-Loy and excellently written by Prasoon Joshi." Sankhayan Ghosh of Film Companion ranked it as the second-best album of the musical trio.

According to the Indian trade website Box Office India, with around 1,100,000 units sold, this film's soundtrack album was the year's thirteenth highest-selling album.

== Track listing ==
Taare Zameen Par (Original Motion Picture Soundtrack) track listing
No.	Title	Singer(s)	Length
1.	"Taare Zameen Par"	Shankar Mahadevan, Dominique Cerejo, Vivienne Pocha	7:08
2.	"Kholo Kholo"	Raman Mahadevan	5:01
3.	"Bum Bum Bole"	Shaan, Aamir Khan, Armaan Malik	5:32
4.	"Maa"	Shankar Mahadevan	5:14
5.	"Bheja Kum (Why?! Why Can't You?!)"	Shankar Mahadevan, Bugs Bhargava, Shankar Sachdev, Roaj Gopal Iyer, Ravi Khanwiker, Loy Mendonsa, Amole Gupte, Kiran Rao, Aamir Khan, Ram Madhavni, Haji Springer	2:07
6.	"Jame Raho"	Vishal Dadlani	2:59
7.	"Mera Jahan"	Adnan Sami, Auriel Cordo, Ananya Wadkar, Amole Gupte	6:32
8.	"Ishaan's Theme"	Shankar–Ehsaan–Loy	4:13
Total length:			38:45

Val Nakshatram (Tamil Dubbed) track listing
No.	Title	Singer(s)	Length
1.	"Mannil Vinmeengal"	Shankar Mahadevan	7:08
2.	"Thatti Thatti Tirandhidhu"	Raman Mahadevan	5:01
3.	"Paru Paru Mayavanthinai"	Karthik	5:32
4.	"Iravil Payanthen"	Shankar Mahadevan	5:14
5.	"Why?! Why Can't You?!"	Shankar Mahadevan	2:07
6.	"Katti Shoevai Katti Belt"	Shankar Mahadevan	2:59
7.	"Oh Little Sweet"	Adnan Sami	6:32
8.	"Ishaan's Theme"	Shankar–Ehsaan–Loy	4:13
Total length:			38:45

== Accolades ==
Accolades for Taare Zameen Par (Original Motion Picture Soundtrack)
Award	Date of ceremony (Note: Date is linked to the article about the awards held that year, wherever possible.)	Category	Recipient(s)	Result	Ref.
Filmfare Awards	16 February 2008	Best Lyricist	Prasoon Joshi ("Maa")	Won	
National Film Awards	21 October 2009	Best Lyricist	Prasoon Joshi ("Maa")	Won	
National Film Awards	21 October 2009	Best Male Playback Singer	Shankar Mahadevan ("Maa")	Won	
Producers Guild Film Awards (Note: Previously known as Apsara Film & Television Producers Guild Awards.)	30 March 2008	Best Lyricist	Prasoon Joshi ("Maa")	Won	
Producers Guild Film Awards	30 March 2008	Best Male Playback Singer	Shankar Mahadevan ("Maa")	Won	
Screen Awards	10 January 2008	Best Lyricist	Prasoon Joshi ("Maa")	Won	
Zee Cine Awards	25 January 2008	Best Lyricist	Prasoon Joshi ("Maa")	Won	
