= Dil To Pagal Hai =

1997 Indian film by Yash Chopra

- Theatrical release poster
- Directed by: Yash Chopra
- Screenplay by: Yash Chopra; Tanuja Chandra; Pamela Chopra
- Dialogues by: Aditya Chopra
- Story by: Pamela Chopra
- Produced by: Yash Chopra
- Starring: Shah Rukh Khan; Madhuri Dixit; Karisma Kapoor; Akshay Kumar
- Cinematography: Manmohan Singh
- Edited by: V. Karnik
- Music by: Uttam Singh
- Production company: Yash Raj Films
- Distributed by: Yash Raj Films
- Release date: 31 October 1997
- Running time: 180 minutes
- Country: India
- Language: Hindi
- Budget: ₹9 crore
- Box office: ₹71.86 crore

Dil To Pagal Hai (Hindi pronunciation: [dɪl toː ˈpaːgəl ɦɛː]; lit. 'The Heart Is Crazy') is a 1997 Indian Hindi-language romantic musical film written, directed, and produced by Yash Chopra. The film stars Shah Rukh Khan, Madhuri Dixit, Karisma Kapoor, and Akshay Kumar. It follows the love lives of the members of a musical troupe, in which two dancers (Dixit and Kapoor) get entangled in a love triangle with their choreographer (Khan). The soundtrack was composed by Uttam Singh, with lyrics written by Anand Bakshi.

Made on a budget of ₹90 million (US$2.48 million), which includes print and advertising costs, Dil To Pagal Hai grossed over ₹718 million (US$19.77 million) worldwide, becoming the highest-grossing Hindi film of the year. The film received widespread critical acclaim, with high praise for its direction, story, screenplay, soundtrack, cinematography and performances of Khan, Dixit, Kapoor and Kumar.

Dil To Pagal Hai was the recipient of several accolades. At the 45th National Film Awards, the film won 3 awards, including Best Popular Film. Kapoor's performance as Nisha won her the National Film Award for Best Supporting Actress. Additionally, it received 11 nominations at the 43rd Filmfare Awards, including Best Director (Yash) and Best Supporting Actor (Kumar), and won a leading 8 awards, including Best Film, Best Actor (Khan), Best Actress (Dixit), and Best Supporting Actress (Kapoor).

It was featured retrospectively at the 45th IFFI in the Celebrating Dance in Indian cinema section.

== Plot ==
Rahul and Nisha are members of a dance troupe that performs dance-based musical plays in Mumbai. Nisha is secretly in love with Rahul, but outwardly they are just friends. Rahul announces his desire to direct a new musical named Maya. The members of the troupe, including Nisha, have their doubts about the title character, "Maya", whom Rahul describes as a girl who believes in true love and is waiting for her Prince Charming, whom she believes will surely appear and take her away. Nisha is cast in the role of Maya.

Pooja, an exceptionally talented and classically trained dancer, is passionate about dancing. Having been orphaned at a young age, she was raised by close friends of her parents. Pooja and Rahul experience a series of near misses as they repeatedly encounter one another. Each of these moments is accompanied by a tune playing in the background, which resonates with Pooja. Pooja is soon taken to Germany by Ajay, the son of her foster parents and her childhood best friend, who has been working in London. Just before Ajay flies back to London, he proposes to Pooja. Conflicted, Pooja eventually accepts his marriage proposal.

Meanwhile, Nisha injures her leg during rehearsals for the upcoming play, and the doctor advises her to rest and avoid dancing for several months. While searching for a new dancer to replace Nisha in the play, Rahul comes across Pooja dancing one day and believes she is perfect for the role. He persuades her to attend their rehearsals and, after much hesitation, she agrees. Eventually, Rahul and Pooja become close friends. Nisha soon returns from hospital and is upset to discover that she has been replaced. She also becomes jealous upon learning that Rahul has feelings for Pooja. Realising that Rahul does not reciprocate her love, she decides to leave for London to visit her parents. During rehearsals, Rahul and Pooja begin to fall in love with one another. When Rahul drops Pooja home one day, he starts whistling his tune, making Pooja realise that she has fallen for the man connected to the tune she has so often heard. The following day, the two visit Pooja's former dance tutor, whom Pooja addresses as Tai, and she realises that they are deeply in love. At the wedding of two members of the dance troupe, Rahul and Pooja share an intimate moment, but neither knows how to express their feelings.

A few days before the premiere of the play, Ajay arrives at the rehearsal hall to surprise Pooja. He tells everyone that he is her fiancé. Rahul is heartbroken, but tries not to show it. Nisha, who has returned from London, notices Rahul's devastation and explains that she too was devastated when he did not return her love. Rahul changes the ending of the play to reflect his heartbreak, in contrast to his usual style of always providing a happy ending. On the night of the premiere, as Rahul and Pooja's characters are about to separate on stage, Ajay plays a recorded tape that Pooja had intended to send him before his proposal, in which she describes her feelings for Rahul. Through this, Ajay indirectly tells Pooja that she and Rahul are meant to be together. Pooja finally realises that she truly loves Rahul, and the two confess their love on stage as the audience applauds them, once again giving the play a happy ending. Backstage, Ajay asks Nisha whether she is married, implying his interest in her.

== Cast ==
- Shah Rukh Khan as Rahul
- Madhuri Dixit as Pooja
- Karishma Kapoor as Nisha
- Akshay Kumar as Ajay
- Farida Jalal as Ajay's mother
- Deven Verma as Ajay's father
- Aruna Irani as Pooja's teacher
- Suresh Menon as Supandi
- Rajesh Tandon as Raju
- Shruti Ulfat as Shruti
- Balvinder Singh Suri as Ballu
- Murad Ali as Jimmy
- Priya Varma as Soni
- Tanya Mukherjee as Tania
- Shivani Wazir as Anjali
- Shahid Kapoor as a background dancer in the song "Le Gayi" (uncredited)

== Production ==
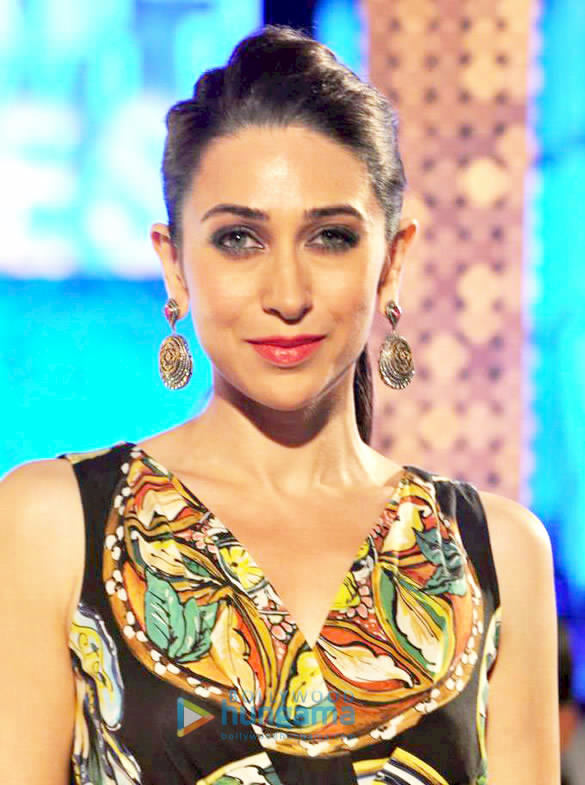
Kapoor played Nisha, a role several actresses rejected

Dil To Pagal Hai was the second of Yash Chopra's 4 consecutive films to star Shah Rukh Khan as the male lead. It was the third film to feature Khan opposite Madhuri Dixit, after Anjaam (1994) and Koyla (1997). The film was originally titled Maine To Mohabbat Kar Li and Tevar before Chopra finally settled on Dil To Pagal Hai as the title.

Sridevi was initially offered to play the role of Pooja, but she declined as she did not find her role as substantial as that in Lamhe. The role then went to Dixit.

After casting Dixit in the lead role of Pooja, Chopra found it hard to cast the role of the second female lead, Nisha. Manisha Koirala was first approached for the role, but declined. Koirala later admitted that she regretted turning it down. The role was then offered to Juhi Chawla, as Chopra wanted two leading actresses of that time to star alongside each other, however Chawla did not want to play second fiddle to Dixit, after playing the leading lady in Chopra's previous film Darr (1993). Kajol and Raveena Tandon were also offered the role; however Kajol declined as she felt that the role was insubstantial while Tandon was considering quitting her career at the time. After some thought, Chopra decided to extend the role of Nisha a little more. Urmila Matondkar, who worked with Khan in Chamatkar (1992), accepted the role, but opted out after a day of shooting. Chopra finally approached Karisma Kapoor who agreed to take up the role and was signed. She felt that despite the short screen-time, a lot could be achieved with the role.

Jackie Shroff was the initial choice to play the role of Ajay, however Chopra felt that a much younger actor was required, promoting Chopra to sign Akshay Kumar. Kumar was reportedly not paid for his role.

In addition to writing the story, Chopra co-produced the film along with M. Vakil under the banner Yash Raj Films. The script was written by Chopra, his son Aditya and wife Pamela. The film's costumes were designed by Manish Malhotra and Karan Johar. Manmohan Singh was the film's cinematographer, while the choreography was handled by Farah Khan and Shiamak Davar. Shahid Kapoor made an uncredited appearance as a dancer in the song ''Le Gayi''.

Chopra rejected 54 dresses created by Malhotra for Dixit's character, choosing a salwar kameez over others. Filming began in June 1996. It was the first Bollywood film to be shot in Baden-Baden and Europa Park, both popular German tourist attractions. It was made on a budget of ₹90 million.

== Soundtrack ==
Dil To Pagal Hai

Soundtrack album by Uttam Singh
- Released: 27 August 1997
- Labels: YRF Music (digital); Saregama (physical)
- Producer: Yash Chopra

Uttam Singh chronology
Jazbaat (1994)	Dil To Pagal Hai (1997)	Dushman (1998)
External audio
- Audio Jukebox on YouTube

The soundtrack of Dil To Pagal Hai includes 10 songs. The songs for the film were composed by Uttam Singh, with lyrics written by Anand Bakshi. The music was a major hit among the audience, with the album becoming the best-selling Bollywood soundtrack of the year and second-most of the 1990s decade, with 12.5 million soundtrack album sales. Chopra earned an advance of ₹45 million for the music rights. In 2008, Chopra launched an unreleased song from the Dil To Pagal Hai soundtrack, titled "Kitni Hai Bekarar Yeh" sung by Lata Mangeshkar & Kumar Sanu.

No.	Title	Singer(s)	Length
1.	"Dil To Pagal Hai"	Lata Mangeshkar, Udit Narayan	05:40
2.	"Are Re Are"	Lata Mangeshkar, Udit Narayan	05:38
3.	"Bholi Si Surat"	Lata Mangeshkar, Udit Narayan	04:17
4.	"Dholna"	Lata Mangeshkar, Udit Narayan	05:21
5.	"Le Gayi"	Asha Bhosle (feat. Udit Narayan (extended film version))	05:46
6.	"Pyar Kar"	Lata Mangeshkar, Udit Narayan	06:48
7.	"Koi Ladki Hai"	Lata Mangeshkar, Udit Narayan	05:34
8.	"Ek Duje Ke Vaaste"	Lata Mangeshkar, Hariharan	03:30
9.	"Are Re Are" (Part 2)	Lata Mangeshkar, Udit Narayan	02:06
10.	"Kitni Hai Bekarar Yeh"	Lata Mangeshkar, Kumar Sanu	05:51
11.	"The Dance of Envy"	Instrumental	03:15
Total length:			54:34

== Release ==
Approximately 300 prints of the film were released worldwide, with 250–260 across India, including approximately 60 in the Mumbai circuit. 60 prints were released overseas.

== Reception ==
=== Critical reception ===
Omar Ahmed of Empire gave the film 4 out of 5 stars, noting, "It's great eye-candy, painting a portrait of a newly prosperous India in rainbow colours. Good performances too make this a cut above the Bollywood average." Screen wrote, "Yash Chopra had made a sophisticated film — not in the elitist sense of inaccessibility or half-understood stylistic innovations but one which prizes good taste. Whether it is 'too sophisticated' for our mass audiences addicted to loud emotions, vulgar dances and gratuitous violence is entirely another matter. You cannot legislate good taste."

Yahoo! Movies, Rediff.com, IBNLive and The Times of India have listed Dil To Pagal Hai as one of the top 10 Yash Chopra films. The film was screened retrospective, during the 2014 International Film Festival of India in the Celebrating Dance in Indian cinema section.

=== Box office ===
Screen reported that Dil To Pagal Hai opened to a "record business with 100 per cent collections in the first week all over India". The report added that prints were sold as ₹2 crore per territory. 100 per cent collections were report also in the second week, and 97 per cent in the third.

It grossed ₹59.82 crore (US$16.47 million) in India and $3.3 million (₹12.04 crore) in other countries, for a worldwide total of ₹71.86 crore (US$19.79 million), against its ₹9 crore (US$2.48 million) budget, which also included print and advertising costs. It had a worldwide opening weekend of ₹4.71 crore (US$1.3 million), and grossed ₹8.97 crore (US$2.47 million) in its first week. It opened on Friday, 31 October 1997, across 245 screens, and earned ₹98 lakh (US$100,000) nett on its opening day. It became the third highest opener of the year behind Border (₹1.12 crore (US$308,373.44) nett) and Koyla (₹1.06 crore (US$291,853.43) nett). It grossed ₹2.75 crore (US$757,166.93) nett in its opening weekend, and had a first week of ₹5.24 crore (US$1.44 million) nett. The film earned a total of ₹34.97 crore (US$9.63 million) nett. It is the 2nd-highest-grossing film of 1997 in India after Border which grossed ₹39.45 crore (US$10.86 million) nett.

Dil To Pagal Hai earned $3.3 million (₹12.04 crore) outside India. Overseas, It is the highest-grossing film of 1997. It ranked as the highest-grossing Indian film of 1997 worldwide.
