= Hawaa Hawaai =

- Directed by: Amole Gupte
- Written by: Amole Gupte
- Produced by: Amole Gupte
- Starring: Partho Gupte; Saqib Saleem; Pragya Yadav
- Cinematography: Amol Gole
- Edited by: Deepa Bhatia
- Music by: Hitesh Sonik
- Production company: Amole Gupte Cinema
- Distributed by: Fox Star Studios
- Release date: 9 May 2014
- Running time: 120 minutes
- Country: India
- Language: Hindi
- Budget: ₹110 million
- Box office: ₹113.6 million

Hawaa Hawaai is a 2014 Indian sports drama film directed by Amole Gupte. The film features Partho Gupte and Saqib Saleem. The film is produced by Fox Star Studios. Saleem portrays a roller skating coach in the film. Gupte also composed and sang one song for the film. The rest of the songs were composed by Hitesh Sonik. Amol Gole, a long time collaborator with Gupte, worked as the cinematographer. The film was released in theatres on 9 May 2014 with good reviews.

== Plot ==
The plot centres around Arjun Harishchand Waghmare and his dream to skate. The film chronicles his coach, Aniket Bhargava, and Arjun's journey toward becoming a champion skater.

After his father's death, Arjun and his family moved to Mumbai. Arjun starts to work at a tea stall, where he sees some children arrive at night for Lucky (Aniket) Sir. He sees that the children are skating and gets attracted to skating. He finds the skates too expensive so his four friends make a pair of skates out of garbage and call it hawaa hawaai. Aniket is impressed by Arjun and decides to teach him skating. Arjun comes out to be very talented and Aniket decides to send him to participate in the district-level skating race. On the day of the race, Arjun goes missing. Aniket finds that he is ill and immediately takes him to a hospital where he learns that Arjun has hepatitis. Arjun gets cured and Aniket learns about the difficulties of the poor child about the lack of proper food, sleep, and continuous workload. He realizes that Arjun and his friends have a big heart and they need to be educated. He tries to help them. All his other students come to meet Arjun and bring him nutritional supplements. Aniket decides to send Arjun to the state-level skating race and registers him from his hometown (Yavatmal district). Arjun remembers his father and wins the race.The film ends by showing that Arjun and his friends are admitted to a school, and an article is printed in the newspaper about Arjun.

== Cast ==
- Partho Gupte as Arjun Harishchand Waghmare / Raju
- Saqib Saleem as Aniket Bhargava / Lucky Sir
- Pragya Yadav as Pragya Nanda
- Makarand Deshpande as Harishchand Waghmare (Arjun's father)
- Devraya Gole
- Anuj Sachdeva as Aniruddha Bhargava (Aniket's elder brother)
- Bugs Bhargava as Mr. Baksh Bhargava, Aniket's father (photo only)
- Razak Khan as Garage Mechanic
- Neha Joshi as Mrs. Waghmare, Arjun's mother
- Rekha Kamat
- Sanjay Dadich
- Sanjay Tripathi
- Dhiraj Utmani as Lucky Sir's skating coach
- Hardik Raheja
- Srishti Sharma
- Arjun Nichani
- Manav Hirey
- Zufin
- Saba Qureshi
- Aaliya Qureshi
- Solya Qureshi
- Suman Arjun Mahaskar
- Thirupathi N. Kushnapelli
- Salman Chhote Khan
- Ashfaque Bismillah Khan
- Maaman Memon
- Mahesh Kumar
- Jaival Shah
- Khushi Shah
- Sunidhi Chauhan (special appearance)
- Riyansh Bhatia

== Production ==
As of 27 August 2013, shooting of the film began in Mumbai.

== Critical reception ==
Hawaa Hawaai got mostly positive reviews from critics. Subhash K. Jha gave it 4.5 Stars and said that "Hawaa Hawaai is an extraordinary saga of ordinary lives, the kind we often pass by at traffic signals". Joginder Tuteja called it a "Touching Tale" and rated it 3.5 stars.
