= Sniff (film) =

- Directed by: Amole Gupte
- Written by: Amole Gupte
- Screenplay by: Amole Gupte
- Produced by: Amole Gupte; Jyoti Deshpande
- Starring: See below
- Music by: Songs: Mujtaba Aziz Naza; Score: Simaab Sen
- Production company: Trinity Pictures
- Distributed by: Eros International
- Release date: 25 August 2017
- Running time: 89 minutes
- Country: India
- Language: Hindi

Sniff is a 2017 Indian Hindi-language action adventure film, written and directed by Amole Gupte, under the banner of Trinity Pictures.

Khushmeet Gill played the lead role in the film.

== Plot ==
The film is based on a boy who can't smell. Later he gets superpowers of smelling in a range of up to 2 km (1.2 mi). He solves a crime case involving car theft.

== Cast ==
- Khushmeet Gill as Sunny Gill
- Monica Sehgal as Bobby Gill
- Surekha Sikri as Bebe
- Suresh Menon as Mr. Verghese
- Sushmita Mukherjee as ACP Bashvati Mukherji
- Putul Guha as Sopan Mukherji, Bashvati's husband
- Manmeet Singh Sawhney as Dharampal Singh Gill, Sunny's father
- Divya Dutta as Mrs. Gill, Sunny's mother (dead)
- Amole Gupte as Mr. Gupte, the member of society
- Nilesh Divekar as Pakya Koli
- Vijay Nikam as Senior Koli

== Production ==
=== Development ===
The official announcement of the film was announced in the first half of September 2016. The title of the film was said to be Sniff.

=== Casting ===
The makers of the film have decided to cast Khushmeet Gill in the film.

=== Filming ===
The principal photography of the film commenced in September 2016.

== Soundtrack ==
No.	Title	Singer(s)	Length
1.	"Bugs Ki Naak"	Amole Gupte, Bugs Bhargava	4:24
2.	"Aur Kitni Door"	Vishal Bhardwaj, Amole Gupte	5:22
3.	"Jai Jai Ganaraj"	Shankar Mahadevan, Amole Gupte	6:01
4.	"Dekhti Kya Hain Aankhen"	Amole Gupte, Kareena Shomakhova	5:30

== Release ==
The Hindu wrote that "Simple it might be but simplistic it certainly is not".
