= Shiamak Davar =

Indian choreographer

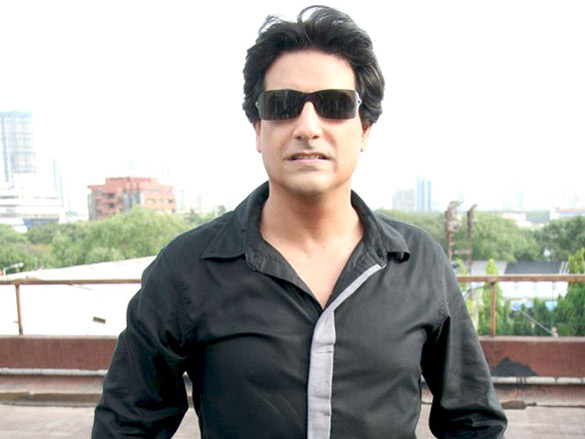
- Davar in 2010

Background information
- Occupations: Choreographer; singer; actor
- Years active: 1996–present
- Website: www.shiamak.com

Shiamak Davar is an Indian choreographer, noted as one of the first to bring contemporary jazz and western forms of dance to India. He is known as the guru of contemporary dance in India. He is responsible for modernising India's dance scene especially in the film and theatre industries. He is known for his ever-evolving and very popular "Shiamak Style" of dance. He was the director of choreography for the Commonwealth Games, Melbourne and Commonwealth Games, Delhi. In 2011, he choreographed the dance sequences for the movie Mission Impossible – Ghost Protocol.

Davar has choreographed Indian actors and celebrities for film and stage for events like the IIFA Awards and the Filmfare Awards. Bollywood actors Shahid Kapoor, Sushant Singh Rajput, Varun Dhawan, Ishaan Khattar were members of the Shiamak Davar Dance Company. Upcoming Indian actors Ruslaan Mumtaz, Shubh and child actor Darsheel Safary were also a part of the Shiamak Davar Dance Company.

Davar won the 1997 National Film Award for Best Choreography for his work in the film Dil to Pagal Hai, as well as the Lycra (R) MTV Style Awards 2007 for 'Most Stylish Song in a Film', for "Dhoom Again" in the Indian film Dhoom 2. In July 2011, Davar received an honorary doctorate from Middlesex University in recognition of his contribution to entertainment in India and throughout the world.

Davar is a Gujarati-speaking Parsi. Currently, he is also on the Board of Advisors of India's International Movement to Unite Nations (I.I.M.U.N.).

== Choreographer ==
Davar began his career in choreography for Hindi cinema with the film Dil To Pagal Hai, for which he won the president's National Film Award. Having changed the way dance was perceived in Indian films, Davar went on to choreograph for Hindi films such as Taal, Kisna, Bunty Aur Babli, Dhoom 2, I See You, Taare Zameen Par, Yuvvraaj, Rab Ne Bana Di Jodi, Bhaag Milkha Bhaag, No Means No, Jagga Jasoos and Fursat.

Shiamak has acted and choreographed in the movie Little Ziziou. He released a hit pop album, Shabop, for which he composed and sang songs with other Indian artists such as Shankar Mahadevan, Hariharan and Shweta Pandit as well as songs mixed and assorted by DJ Aqeel.

Shiamak has been the performance and entertainment designer for shows such as the Sahara Sangeet Awards, the Shiamak Davar China Tou', the Seventh Cairo International Song Festival, IIFA Awards, Shiamak: The Spirit of Song and Dance South Africa, I Believe — A Shiamak Davar Spectacular and The Unforgettable World Tour.

Shiamak has directed, designed and performed at global events like the 2006 Commonwealth Games closing ceremony, the 2010 Commonwealth Games closing ceremony, the World Economic Forum, Davos (2006) and entertained leaders including Bill Clinton who said, "the world must see you", 44th Chess Olympiad, 2023 Men's FIH Hockey World Cup.

== Singer ==
Shiamak is known for his live performances. He has often cited Elton John to be his hero, and John's influence on Shiamak is clearly discernible.

As a recording artist, Shiamak made his debut with an English album Survive in 1991 when pop music was still nascent in India. He made his Hindi Pop debut with the album Mohabbat Karle, which sold 1.2 million copies in India. The song 'Jane Kisne' was quite a rage, especially amongst teenage girls, and was nominated for several awards, but winning none, as most awards went to Daler Mehndi's 'Ho Gayi Teri Balle Balle'. The title track "Mohabbat Karle" plagiarised its melody from Angelique Kidjo's Adouma. He also has other musical works in Hindi – Dil Chahe and Shabop. His latest album Shabop featured songs with Shankar Mahadevan, Hariharan and Shweta Pandit.

Shiamak has shared the stage with artists such as Sting, Bryan Adams and Eddy Grant.He was the opening act for Bryan Adams for his 2011 India concerts. He also performed for Oprah in 2012 during her visit to India.

== Charity ==
As a philanthropist, he runs the VAF (Victory Arts Foundation) that teaches dance to underprivileged children and children with mental and physical disabilities to help them experience the pleasure of expression through "dance as therapy".
