= Sangeet Manapmaan (soundtrack) =

Soundtrack album by Shankar–Ehsaan–Loy
- Released: 25 December 2024
- Recorded: 2023–2024
- Genre: Feature film soundtrack
- Length: 52:15
- Language: Marathi
- Label: Saregama
- Producer: Shankar–Ehsaan–Loy

Shankar–Ehsaan–Loy chronology
Yudhra (2024)	Sangeet Manapmaan (2024)

Sangeet Manapmaan is the soundtrack album is composed by Shankar–Ehsaan–Loy for the 2025 musical film of the same name directed by Subodh Bhave. The film marked the trio's second collaboration with Bhave after Katyar Kaljat Ghusali (2015) and the soundtrack featured 14 songs—the original songs based on the play written by Krushnaji Prabhakar Khadilkar and composed by Govindrao Tembe, were revived for the film, while the new songs featured lyrics written by Sameer Samant. The album was distributed by Saregama label and released on 25 December 2024 at a music launch event held in Mumbai.

== Marketing and release ==
The soundtrack preceded with the first song "Vandan Ho", that accompanied with a promotional video featuring the three singers Shankar Mahadevan, Rahul Deshpande, and Mahesh Kale, released on 21 November 2024. A music launch event was held on 25 December 2024, in the presence of the film's musicians, choreographers, and the cast and crew, at the Lok Shaheer Anna Bhau Sathe Auditorium, Byculla. The event also showcased a harmonium that was over 125 years old, once used by Govindrao Tembe, who had composed the music for the original play. Subsequently, songs "Shura Mee Vandile", "Neet Paha", "Sangu Kasa Me" and "Hrutu Vasant" were released, which generated much hype for the film.

Afterwards, on 1 January 2025, New Year's Day, the grand title track "Vandan Ho," featuring Amruta Khanvilkar and choreographed by Deepali Vichare, was unveiled. Four days before the film's release, a romantic song "Chandrika" picturized on the characters Dhairyadhar and Vanmala, sung by Sonu Nigam, was released, further amplifying anticipation for the film.

== Reception ==
Nandini Ramnath of Scroll.in added "Subodh Bhave relies heavily on the composers Shankar-Ehsaan-Loy to justify Sangeet Manapmaan's journey to the big screen. The musicians roll out a series of magnificent tunes, each one soulfully rendered and impeccably arranged. Given the overall lack to attention to the basic ingredients of period productions [...] Sangeet Manapmaan is salvaged almost entirely by its soundtrack." Jaydeep Pathakji of The Times of India wrote "Music is a stronghold of this film. With 14 songs from Shankar-Ehsaan-Loy, Sangeet Manapmaan's music is a treat to the ears. Comparisons with Bhave's previous musical, Katyar Kaljat Ghusli (KKG) are inevitable and one thing that stands out is the mix of new and old songs which happened seamlessly in KKG, but not here. That said, the songs in themselves are beautiful."

Mayur Sanap of Rediff.com wrote "The musical pieces are among the film's strong suit but despite the quality, most of these songs don't gel well with the narrative and even obstruct the flow at times. Take an earlier example of another Marathi musical Phullwanti or even the streaming show Bandish Bandits, there the songs are almost perfectly placed to maintain the rhythm of a musical." Reshma Raikwar of Loksatta praised the film's musical compositions and the adaptation of the original songs, while critic based at Maharashtra Times noted that though music being an integral part of the film, added that some of the new songs did not seem to belong to the traditional genre.

== Track listing ==
No.	Title	Lyrics	Singer(s)	Length
1.	"Vandan Ho"	Sameer Samant	Shankar Mahadevan, Rahul Deshpande, Mahesh Kale	5:46
2.	"Shura Mee Vandile"	Krushnaji Prabhakar Khadilkar	Shankar Mahadevan, Avadhoot Gupte, Aarya Ambekar, Asmita Chinchalkar	2:33
3.	"Mala Madan Bhase"	Krushnaji Prabhakar Khadilkar	Aarya Ambekar	2:42
4.	"Chandrika"	Sameer Samant	Sonu Nigam	4:22
5.	"Hrutu Vasant"	Sameer Samant	Shankar Mahadevan, Bela Shende	3:57
6.	"Naahi Me Bolat"	Krushnaji Prabhakar Khadilkar	Priyanka Barve	2:50
7.	"Tagamaga Hote Jeevachi"	Sameer Samant	Shivam Mahadevan, Pratibha Singh Baghel	3:20
8.	"Neet Paha"	Sameer Samant	Jasraj Joshi	3:56
9.	"Sangu Kasa Me"	Sameer Samant	Krishna Bongane	2:42
10.	"Prem Seva Sharan"	Krushnaji Prabhakar Khadilkar	Anand Bhate, Aarya Ambekar	2:25
11.	"Ravi Mee"	Krushnaji Prabhakar Khadilkar	Hrishikesh Badve	3:07
12.	"Dhairyasheel Kshamasheel"	Sameer Samant	Shankar Mahadevan, Shrinidhi Ghatate	4:05
13.	"Ran Gagan Sadan"	Krushnaji Prabhakar Khadilkar	Shounak Abhisheki	2:43
14.	"Jai Ho Sangrampur"	Krushnaji Prabhakar Khadilkar	Avadhoot Gupte, Aarya Ambekar, Savani Ravindra, Shrinidhi Ghatate	7:47
Total length:				52:15

== Credits ==
Credits adapted from Saregama

- Music composers and producers: Shankar–Ehsaan–Loy
- Original songs from the play Sangeet Manapmaan composed by: Govindrao Tembe
- Original songs from the play Sangeet Manapmaan written by: Krushnaji Prabhakar Khadilkar
- Lyricist (new songs): Sameer Samant
- Additional music production: Souumil Shringarpure, Amit Padhye
- Music supervision and arrangement: Aditya Oke
- Recording and mixing: Ameya Mategaonkar (Lambodara Studios, Mumbai), Rahul Sharma (Studios 504, Mumbai; assisted by Sameer Dharap)
- Mastering: Gethin John (Haford Mastering, Wales, United Kingdom)
- Rhythm: Dipesh Varma, Keyur Barve
- Tabla: Prasad Padhye, Vinayak Netake, Krishna Musale
- Pakhwaj: Krishna Musale, Prabhakar Mosamkar
- Dholki: Ratnadeep Jamsandekar, Krishna Musale, Prabhakar Mosamkar
- Dholak: Ratnadeep Jamsandekar, Krishna Musale, Prabhakar Mosamkar, Prasad Malankar, Sachin Savant
- Percussions: Dipesh Varma, Ratnadeep Jamsandekar, Keyur Barve, Omkar Salunkhe, Shikar Naad Qureshi, Prabhakar Mosamkar
- Guitar: Shon Pinto
- Plucks: Shon Pinto, Tapas Roy
- Sitar: Bhagirath Bhatt
- Violin: Manas Kumar
- Flute: Varad Kathapurkar
- Chorus: Umesh Joshi, Vijay Dhuri, Janardan Dhatrak, Sagar Lele, Vidit Patankar, Swapnil Godbole, Pragati Joshi, Aditi Prabhudesai, Madhura Paranjape, Rucha Padhye
