= Darsheel Safary =

Indian television and film actor (born 1997)

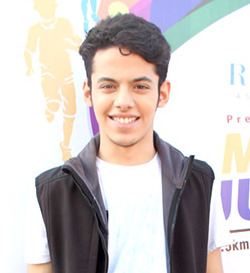
- Darsheel Safary at the Mumbai Juniorthon
- Born: 9 March 1997 (age 29); Mumbai, Maharashtra, India
- Occupation: Actor
- Years active: 2007–present
- Notable work: Taare Zameen Par

Darsheel Safary (born 9 March 1997) is an Indian actor who appears in Hindi, Gujarati films and television. Safary made his film debut with the leading role of a dyslexic student in Aamir Khan's directorial debut, the critically acclaimed drama Taare Zameen Par (2007), for which he won the Filmfare critic's Award for Best Actor.

== Career ==
Safary made his acting debut in Taare Zameen Par (2007), playing the film's protagonist Ishaan Nandkishore Awasthi. Safary was discovered by script writer and creative director, Amol Gupte in late 2006 when he was looking for a male lead for Taare Zameen Par. After going through hundreds of auditions, Gupte found Safary at Shiamak Davar's dancing school, "Summer Funk". In choosing Safary, Gupte had a number of boys audition for a scene in which they would informally describe how they would "bunk" school after being given a few scenarios. He recalls, "It was a tough call. But Darsheel has the mischief in his eyes to be Ishaan. Everyone just naturally gravitated towards him."

Safary's performance as a struggling dyslexic child was praised by film critics. He won several awards for his performance. Taran Adarsh from indiaFM called Safary a "Master" and stated his performance merited a special award. Rajeev Masand of CNN-IBN wrote, "Darsheel Safary steals your heart as Ishaan Awasthi. Darsheel is a revelation as an actor, he's spontaneous and lovable and carries this film completely on his shoulders". Other reviewers called Safary the "real star of the film" and his performance as "brilliant". In a 2007 interview, Safary stated that his career plans may include singing, dancing, becoming a businessman or jewellery designer.

His second film Bumm Bumm Bole came in 2010 and according to some sources he was paid ₹ 3 lakh, the highest amount paid to any child actor at the time. He did two more films, Disney India's superhero film Zokkomon (2011) and Deepa Mehta's Midnight's Children (2012).

In 2012, he participated in dance reality show Jhalak Dikhhla Jaa with Avneet Kaur as his dance partner, but was eliminated and came in seventh position. He took a break from acting to focus on studies.

In 2016, he played the role of Abhay in the anthology series Yeh Hai Aashiqui. He then appeared in 2023 Hindi sports drama film, Hukus Bukus. and Gujarati film, Kutch Express (film).

== Filmography ==
=== Films ===
Year	Title	Role	Notes	Ref.
2007	Taare Zameen Par	Ishaan Nandkishore Awasthi	Filmfare Award for Best Actor (Critics); Nominated–Filmfare Award for Best Actor	
2010	Bumm Bumm Bole	Pinaki "Pinu" Gwala		
2011	Zokkomon	Kunal/Zokkomon		
2012	Midnight's Children	Saleem Sinai		
2022	Capital A Small A	Aadi	Short film	
2023	Kutch Express	Avinash	Gujarati film	
2023	Hukus Bukus	Arjun		
2023	Ho Ja Mukt	Vikram		
2025	Phule	Yashwant		

=== Television ===
Year	Title	Role	Notes	Ref.
2011	Taarak Mehta Ka Ooltah Chashmah	Himself	Guest appearance	
2012	Jhalak Dikhhla Jaa (season 5)	Contestant	7th place	
2015	Lage Raho Chachu	Himself	Guest appearance	
2016	Yeh Hai Aashiqui (season 3)	Abhay	Episode: "Pyaar Mein 2nd"	
2021	Butterflies (season 2)	Sharan	Episode: "Half Half"	
2025	Maharani	Surya	season 4	

=== Web series ===
Year	Title	Role	Notes	Ref.
2022	Aadha Ishq	Jazz		

=== Music videos ===
Year	Title	Singer	Notes
2020	Pyaar Naal	Vibhor Prashar	

== Awards and nominations ==
Year	Award	Category	Film	Result	Source
2008	Filmfare Awards	Best Actor	Taare Zameen Par	Nominated	
2008	Filmfare Awards	Best Actor (Critics)	Taare Zameen Par	Won	
2008	Zee Cine Awards	Best Actor (Critics)	Taare Zameen Par	Won	
2008	Zee Cine Awards	Most Promising Debut (Best Child Artist)	Taare Zameen Par	Won	
2008	Star Screen Awards	Special Jury Award	Taare Zameen Par	Won	
2008	V. Shantaram Awards	Best Actor in a Leading Role	Taare Zameen Par	Won	
