= Deepa Bhatia =

Indian film editor

- Born: India
- Occupations: Editor, director
- Spouse: Amole Gupte
- Children: Partho Gupte

Deepa Bhatia is a Bollywood film editor, producer and director based in Mumbai. She is known for editing commercially successful films like Tare Zameen Par, My Name is Khan, Rock On, Kai Po Che, Student of the Year and Raees. Furthermore, she has also edited Kedarnath, Drive and the much talked about biopic on Sachin Tendulkar, Sachin: A Billion Dreams.

Deepa believes that editing is making something the best it can be. In her own words, "A movie is written thrice. Once, when it is written, the second, when it is directed, and the third, when it is edited. It is unfortunate that editors don't get their due. It frustrates me when people think cutting is editing."

In 2010, UTV World Movies chose her as the personality of the month to pick four movies of her choice from the channel's collection. The movies she picked were Machuca, Cousin Cousine, Twin Sisters and 8 Women.

== Career ==
Deepa started her career by assisting directors before venturing into full-time into post-production. She has over 20 years of experience as an editor and has worked with directors like Govind Nihalani (Dev, Hazaar Chaurasi Ki Maa, Deham) and Jahnu Barua (Maine Gandhi Ko Nahi Mara, Har Pall). Her editing work on films like Kai Po Che and Rock On has been one of her most noteworthy projects and has bagged her awards like the Star Screen Awards.

Apart from her career as a film editor in Bollywood, she has also directed and produced a critically acclaimed documentary titled Nero’s Guests: The Age of Inequality about farmer suicides in Maharashtra. The documentary won two awards at Mumbai International Film Festival (MIFF). It took Deepa 5 years to direct and a year to edit this challenging documentary.

== Personal life ==
Deepa is married to screenwriter, Amole Gupte and they have a son Partho Gupte. She is an alumna of Sophia Polytechnic.

== Filmography ==
=== Editor ===
Year	Movie	Notes
1998	Hazaar Chaurasi Ki Maa	
1999	Thakshak	
2004	Dev	
2005	Maine Gandhi Ko Nahin Mara	
2005	The Hangman	
2007	Taare Zameen Par	
2008	Rock On!!	
2010	My Name Is Khan	
2011	Stanley Ka Dabba	Producer
2012	Ferrari Ki Sawaari	
2012	Student of the Year	
2013	Kai Po Che!	
2013	Bombay Talkies	
2014	Hawaa Hawaai	
2014	Placebo (Documentary)	Consulting Editor
2014	Ungli	
2016	Zubaan	
2016	Fitoor	
2017	Raees	
2017	Sachin: A Billion Dreams	
2017	Daddy	
2018	Kedarnath	
2019	Drive	
2021	Skater Girl	

=== Director ===
- Nero's Guests: The Age of Inequality (Documentary)

== Awards ==
Star Screen Awards

- Won: Best Editing – Rock On!!
- Won: John Abraham National Award for Best Documentary in SIGNS 2011 – Nero's Guests
- Won: Best Editing – Kai Po Che!
