= Amole Gupte =

Indian screenwriter, actor, and director

- Born: 1962 (age 63–64); Mumbai, India
- Occupations: Director, screenwriter, actor, singer
- Children: Partho Gupte

Amole Gupte (born c. 1962) is an Indian screenwriter, actor, singer and director, known for his work on the 2007 film Taare Zameen Par as a creative director and screenwriter. He conceived the film along with his wife, Deepa Bhatia (concept, research, and editing). He was the chairperson of the Children's Film Society, India from 2012 to 2015. And presently serves as a member of the advisory board of the Kautik International Student Film Festival.

== Filmography ==
=== Director ===
Year	Film	Director	Writer	Producer	Note
2007	Panga Naa Lo	No	Yes	No	
2007	Taare Zameen Par	No	Yes	No	also Creative director
2011	Stanley Ka Dabba	Yes	Yes	Yes	
2014	Hawaa Hawaai	Yes	Yes	Yes	
2017	Sniff	Yes	Yes	Yes	
2021	Saina	Yes	Yes	No	

=== Actor ===
- Holi (1984)
- Jo Jeeta Wohi Sikandar (1992)
- Kaminey (2009) as Sunil Shekhar Bhope a.k.a. Bhope Bhau
- Phas Gaye Re Obama (2010)
- Urumi (2011)
- Stanley Ka Dabba (2011)
- Bheja Fry 2 (2011)
- Singham Returns (2014)
- Ek Tara (2015)
- Sniff (2017)
- Mumbai Saga (2021)
- Murderbaad (2025)
- Raja Shivaji (2026)

TELEVISION: Amole Gupte played the role of Anoop in the superhit serial Palash Ke Phool (1988) of Doordarshan, produced by veteran actress Asha Parekh.

== Awards ==
Year	Work	Award	Category	Result
2008	Taare Zameen Par	Apsara Film & Television Producers Guild Awards	Best Story	Won
2008	Taare Zameen Par	Apsara Film & Television Producers Guild Awards	Best Screenplay	Won
2008	Taare Zameen Par	Filmfare Awards	Best Story	Won
2008	Taare Zameen Par	Screen Awards	Best Story	Won
2008	Taare Zameen Par	Screen Awards	Best Dialogue	Won
2008	Taare Zameen Par	Zee Cine Awards	Best Story	Won
2008	Taare Zameen Par	V. Shantaram Award	Best Writer	Won
2010	Kaminey	Apsara Film & Television Producers Guild Awards	Best Actor in a Negative Role	Nominated
2010	Kaminey	Filmfare Awards	Best Supporting Actor	Nominated
2010	Kaminey	IIFA Awards	Best Villain	Nominated
2010	Kaminey	Screen Awards	Best Villain	Nominated
2010	Kaminey	Screen Awards	Most Promising Newcomer – Male	Nominated
2010	Kaminey	Stardust Awards	Breakthrough Performance – Male	Nominated
2010	Kaminey	V. Shantaram Awards	Best Supporting Actor	Nominated
