= IBTE Sultan Bolkiah Campus =

Campus in Seria

- IBTE Kampus Sultan Bolkiah
- Former names: Sultan Bolkiah Vocational School (Sekolah Vokasional Sultan Bolkiah)
- Type: Public
- Established: 1996; 30 years ago
- Parent institution: Institute of Brunei Technical Education
- Location: Seria, Belait, Brunei; 4.5998318°N 114.3219099°E
- Campus: Urban
- Website: ibte.edu.bn

IBTE Sultan Bolkiah Campus (Malay: IBTE Kampus Sultan Bolkiah, Abbrev: SCB), formerly known as Sultan Bolkiah Vocational School (Malay: Sekolah Vokasional Sultan Bolkiah, Abbrev: SVSB), is a campus of the Institute of Brunei Technical Education (IBTE), a post-secondary vocational institution in Brunei. It is located in Seria, Belait District. The institution offers vocational courses in the fields of welding and fabrication.

== History ==
IBTE Sultan Bolkiah Campus became operational in 1996 with the name Sekolah Vokasional Sultan Bolkiah (Sultan Bolkiah Vocational School) as an independent government technical college, overseen by the then Department of Technical Education under the Ministry of Education. In 2014, it was subsumed under, and made a campus of, IBTE, the umbrella institution which effectively replaced the department. The campus acquired its present name two years later. On 24 November 2015, students from the campus hosted a Basic Business Research Module (FBS) Clean Project at Lumut Beach, in which was part of the Corporate Social Responsibility (CSR) assessment.

On 9 October 2017, students from the Chung Ching Middle School visited the campus, and later on the 26th a visit was hosted by the Air Engineering Unit, Technical Equipment Maintenance Division (TEMD) and the Royal Brunei Air Force (RBAF) to the Rimba Air Force Base. From 30 until 31 October 2018, a Market Day was held within the campus. A financial roadshow was hosted by TAKAFUL Brunei Keluarga Sdn Bhd (TBK) at the Sayyidina Ali Secondary School (SMSA), in which students from SCB and IBTE Jefri Bolkiah Campus attended. The Department of Administration and Services at the Ministry of Education (MoE) visited the campus on 30 November 2019.

Another beach cleaning campaign was carried out by the students of the campus at the Liang Lumut Recreational Club, Lumut on 28 August 2020. A collaboration with Green Brunei and Mitsubishi Corporation was made on 31 January 2022 with a tree planting campaign which consisted of 22 donated saplings was carried throughout the campus.

== Academics ==
The Sultan Bolkiah Campus houses three of IBTE's schools, namely the School of Engineering and Satellites, School of Information and Communication Technology, and School of Information and School of Business. The schools offer programmes in the fields of engineering and information and communications technology, leading up to Diploma, Higher National Technical Education Certificate (HNTec) and National Technical Education Certificate (NTec).
