= 3 Idiots =

2009 Indian film by Rajkumar Hirani

- Theatrical release poster
- Directed by: Rajkumar Hirani
- Written by: Abhijat Joshi; Rajkumar Hirani
- Story by: Abhijat Joshi; Rajkumar Hirani; Chetan Bhagat
- Based on: Five Point Someone by Chetan Bhagat
- Produced by: Vidhu Vinod Chopra
- Starring: Aamir Khan; R. Madhavan; Sharman Joshi; Kareena Kapoor; Boman Irani; Mona Singh
- Narrated by: R. Madhavan
- Cinematography: C. K. Muraleedharan
- Edited by: Rajkumar Hirani
- Music by: Songs: Shantanu Moitra; Score: Shantanu Moitra; Atul Raninga; Sanjay Wadrekar
- Production company: Vinod Chopra Films
- Distributed by: Reliance Entertainment
- Release date: 25 December 2009 (India)
- Running time: 171 minutes
- Country: India
- Language: Hindi
- Budget: ₹55 crore
- Box office: ₹400.61 crore

3 Idiots is a 2009 Indian Hindi-language coming-of-age comedy-drama film written, edited and directed by Rajkumar Hirani, co-written by Abhijat Joshi and produced by Vidhu Vinod Chopra. The film stars Aamir Khan, R. Madhavan and Sharman Joshi in the title roles, while Kareena Kapoor, Boman Irani, Mona Singh and Omi Vaidya play supporting roles. Narrated through two parallel timelines, one in the present and the other set ten years earlier, the story follows the friendship of three students at an Indian engineering college and is a satire about the intrinsic paternalism under the Indian education system.

Adapted loosely from Chetan Bhagat's novel Five Point Someone, It is produced by Chopra under the banner Vinod Chopra Films.

Upon its release, 3 Idiots received widespread critical acclaim with praise directed towards its direction, themes, humour, story, screenplay, soundtrack and performances of the cast. The film became a major box office success and one of the few Indian films at the time to become successful in East Asian markets such as China and Japan, eventually bringing its worldwide gross to ₹460 crore (US$90 million) (Note: 3 Idiots worldwide gross: ₹459 crore (US$90 million): Domestic: ₹273.82 crore (US$57.05 million); Overseas: US$30.5 million (₹186.142 crore)) — it was the highest-grossing Indian film ever at the time until 2013, when Dhoom 3 surpassed it.

At the 57th National Film Awards, 3 Idiots won three awards, including Best Popular Film Providing Wholesome Entertainment. Additionally, it won a leading 6 awards at the 55th Filmfare Awards (tying with Dev.D), including Best Film, Best Director (Hirani) and Best Supporting Actor (Irani). Overseas, it won the Grand Prize at Japan's Videoyasan Awards, while it was nominated for Best Outstanding Foreign Language Film at the Japan Academy Awards and Best Foreign Film at China's Beijing International Film Festival.

Considered to be among the greatest Indian films ever made, the film also had a social impact on attitudes toward education in India, as well as in other Asian countries such as China and South Korea and a huge cult following for its relevance and humour. It was remade in Tamil as Nanban (2012), which also received critical praise and commercial success. A Mexican remake, 3 Idiotas, was also released in 2017.

== Plot ==
Past

At the Imperial College of Engineering (ICE), Ranchoddas "Rancho" Shamaldas Chanchad arrives as an academically gifted student, challenging professors with his unconventional beliefs. He befriends fellow engineering students Farhan Qureshi and Raju Rastogi. After the suicide of Joy Lobo, a student whose project was rejected by the director, Dr. Viru "Virus" Sahastrabuddhe, because he had repeatedly delayed his project to focus on his dad's health, Rancho holds Virus responsible, leading to a prolonged rivalry between them.

The conflict escalates when the three attend a wedding hosted by Virus, where Rancho meets Virus's daughter Pia, a medical student. In retaliation, Virus pressures Raju into moving out of Rancho's dormitory and into the room of Chatur Ramalingam, a competitive student. During a formal event welcoming college administrators, Rancho and Farhan alter Chatur's speech with obscene phrases. Following this, Chatur challenges Rancho to determine who will achieve greater success in the next ten years.

Farhan and Raju consistently rank at the bottom of their class, while Rancho tops the examinations. Rancho encourages Farhan to pursue wildlife photography instead of engineering and Raju to confront his insecurities. After urinating on Virus's residence during a night of drinking, Raju is caught and given two choices: betray Rancho or face expulsion. Hesitant to make either choice, Raju subsequently attempts suicide by jumping from a window. He survives the fall and secures a prestigious job after recovering from a coma. Farhan obtains his father's support for his photography career.

Wanting to undermine Raju's placement, Virus designs a particularly difficult exam. With Pia's help, Rancho and Farhan break into his office to obtain the exam paper. Raju refuses to use it, and all three are caught and expelled. Pia reveals to her father a suicide note left by her late brother, who had died by suicide due to academic pressure.

That night, a severe storm cuts off the city's power grid. Virus's elder daughter, Mona, goes into labor. Using makeshift campus equipment and with the assistance from his classmates, Rancho helps deliver the baby. Virus rescinds the expulsion and acknowledges Rancho's contributions to the college.

Present

Chatur Ramalingam, now a wealthy businessman, returns to India to secure a contract with the reclusive inventor Phunsukh Wangdu. He reunites with Farhan and Raju and the three embark on a journey to find Rancho, who vanished after graduation.

Arriving at Shimla, the trio learn that the student they knew as Rancho was Chhote, son of the Chanchaḍ family gardener. The real Ranchoddas Chanchad's father had sponsored Chhote's education, to obtain a degree for the family, under the condition he never contacted his former classmates.

The group find and rescue Pia from a forced marriage in Manali before proceeding to Ladakh, where they reunite with Chhote, who now operates a school focused on alternative education. Chatur mocks his profession as a village teacher and demands he sign a declaration of surrender. Chhote then reveals himself to be Phunsukh Wangdu, the inventor Chatur had sought. Chatur accepts defeat as the four run along the shoreline laughing.

== Cast ==
- Aamir Khan as Phunsukh Wangdu, alias Ranchhoddas "Rancho" Shamaldas Chanchad, friend of Raju and Farhan, Pia's love interest
- R. Madhavan as Farhan Qureshi, friend of Rancho and Raju
- Sharman Joshi as Raju Rastogi, friend of Farhan and Rancho
- Boman Irani as Dr. Viru "Virus" Sahastrabuddhe, the strict, competitive director of ICE, father of Mona and Pia
- Kareena Kapoor as Pia Sahastrabuddhe, a medical student and the younger daughter of Viru, Mona's sister, Rancho's love interest
- Omi Vaidya as Chatur "Silencer" Ramalingam, an NRI student
- Mona Singh as Mona Sahastrabuddhe, elder daughter of Viru, Pia's sister
- Ali Fazal as Joy Lobo (cameo), an engineering student at ICE
- Rahul Kumar as Manmohan a.k.a. "Millimetre"
  - Dushyant Wagh as a grown-up Manmohan a.k.a. "Centimetre"
- Parikshit Sahni as Farhan's father
- Farida Dadi as Farhan's mother
- Akhil Mishra as Librarian Dubey
- Amardeep Jha as Raju's mother
- Mukund Bhatt as Raju's paralysed father
- Olivier Sanjay Lafont as Suhas Tandon, Pia’s on-and-off fiancé
- Rajendra Patwardhan as Govind, Virus' valet
- Rajeev Ravindranathan as ragging senior student
- Jayant Kripalani as a company head
- Chaitali Bose as Kammo, Raju's sister
- Javed Jaffrey as the real Ranchhoddas Shamaldas Chanchad (cameo)
- Arun Bali as Shamaldas Chanchad
- Achyut Potdar as Machine Class Professor
- Madhav Vaze as Joy's father

== Production ==
=== Development ===
"Chetan gave me this book to read and I wanted to make a film on it. But I knew right from the start that I could not make a film completely on the book, as it was very anecdotal and a film needs a plot. So I had decided to rewrite it in a screenplay format. You'll see that the film is very different from the book. After I wrote the script, I called Chetan and narrated it to him. I told him that if he did not like the script, I would stop the project. But he was okay with it".

— Rajkumar Hirani, about the connection with the film and the novel Five Point Someone by Chetan Bhagat

After the success of Lage Raho Munna Bhai (2006), the director Rajkumar Hirani and screenwriter Abhijat Joshi had plans for third instalment on the Munna Bhai franchise, titled Munnabhai Chale Amerika. But Hirani felt exhausted working on consecutive films on the same format, and decided to work on fresh script outside the franchise. While writing the first draft of the film, he thought of a new project rather than the new instalment from the film series, but he had concentrated more on the project and then worked on the former first. While thinking about how the project coming under fruition, he got the popular novel Five Point Someone by the author Chetan Bhagat. The latter gave this novel for Hirani to read, in order to have an idea about the script. Impressed by the novel, he decided to adapt the screenplay by making changes to the original novel and work on it as a feature film.

3 Idiots is considered to be the first of the two adaptations from the novel Five Point Someone — the second being Kai Po Che! (2013), which also drew inspiration from the novel The 3 Mistakes of My Life written by Bhagat. In the third collaboration with Hirani after the Munna Bhai film series: Munna Bhai M.B.B.S. (2003) and Lage Raho Munna Bhai (2006), Vidhu Vinod Chopra produced the project under the production company Vinod Chopra Films (which earlier named Vinod Chopra Productions). Besides producing, Chopra further associated with Hirani and Joshi, by co-writing the screenplay. In his biography Unscripted: Conversations on Life and Cinema, he discussed the experiences as a co-writer being associated in the project.

An official announcement regarding the film was made during early-2008, after working in the script for more than one-and-a-half year. During the pre-production, Hirani went to multiple engineering colleges, including those under the Indian Institutes of Technology in Mumbai and Delhi, to authenticate the lives of engineering students. He met many students and took pictures along with them. He needed the references for the clothes used, their looks and things they brought as many IIT-students were older than the fictional characters. The film also had shared many anecdotes from his college life, since Hirani had used to study in hostel during his young period. Hirani had carefully looked upon the notion in the lives of engineering students, as there are few things apart from drugs, sex and violence. However, Hirani had said that the film plays a satirical take on social pressures under an Indian education system. Apart from that, the film also addresses the issue of tussle between parents and children, but in a "sugar-coated manner". During the promotions of the film, Hirani stated that "the film is completely different of the Munna Bhai film series; in terms of the characters, story and the environment. However, both the films fall in the same genre, where all three films are heartwarming stories with lovable characters making it feel good. Both films have true emotions in the heart, happiness, sadness and also leave a strong message to the audience in the ending that make us satisfy".

The basis of the lead character, Ranchoddas "Rancho" Chanchad / Phunsukh Wangdu, is unclear. According to Hirani, he was based on a fellow student at the Film and Television Institute of India (FTII) who similarly attended the school under a friend's identity under a mutual arrangement. Chopra claimed that the character was based on himself instead, and later said the character's name was based on that of a classmate at FTII. It has often been speculated that the character was based on educator and activist Sonam Wangchuk. Wangchuk had stated he had met Aamir Khan, who ultimately starred as Wangdu / Rancho, in 2008, but had never met with the filmmakers and wrote to them about his meeting with Khan following inquiries from some students who saw similarities between him and character. During Wangchuk's 2026 hunger strike, Omi Vaidya, who starred as Chatur, issued a statement in support, linking him to Wangdu / Rancho. Afterwards, Aamir Khan answered that the character was not based on Wangchuk in a Q&A session, saying "we didn't know about Mr. Sonam" during production.

=== Casting ===
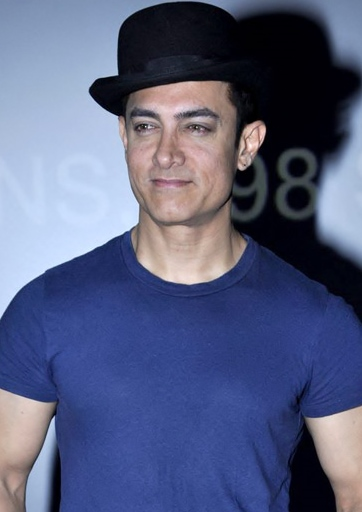
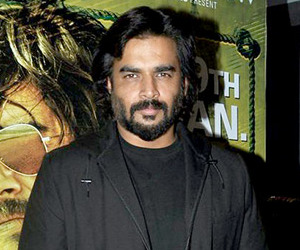
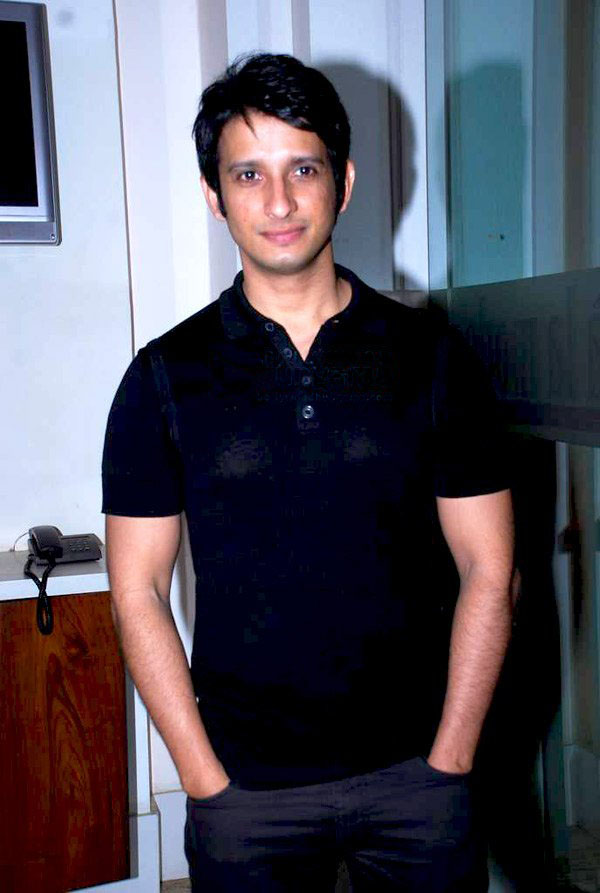
The lead actors of 3 Idiots: Aamir Khan, R. Madhavan and Sharman Joshi (left to right)

The casting of the lead actors was considered to be "complex", according to Hirani. He thought of many actors playing the lead roles and also went on a six-month audition across the country, during which newcomers like Rajkummar Rao, Jacqueline Fernandez, Amruta Khanvilkar, Jitendra Joshi, Gurmeet Chaudhary and Pulkit Samrat also had auditioned. Rohan Mapuskar, one of the casting directors, revealed that Khanvilkar was originally finalised for the role of Pia, and even her payment was discussed. Meanwhile, Joshi was selected for Raju's role before the casting decisions were changed. However, Hirani thought of established actors playing the roles, since the film had two looks and the actors needed experience. He had plans for Shah Rukh Khan playing the lead character, Ranchoddas Chanchad. Hirani tried to rope Khan after the latter exited from the titular role Munna Bhai in the director's debut venture Munna Bhai M.B.B.S. (2003), which was later essayed by Sanjay Dutt. However, Khan refused being a part of the film due to his prior commitments. Ranbir Kapoor, then a relative newcomer, also declined the lead role, but agreed to a short cameo as Varun Sahastrabuddhe. (Note: Both Ranbir Kapoor and Anushka Sharma later worked with Rajkumar Hirani in PK (2014) and Sanju (2018), the latter was the biopic of Sanjay Dutt.) Hrithik Roshan also turned down the character. Aamir Khan was later finalised to play the lead role.

R. Madhavan and Sharman Joshi were also finalised for the other two leads – Farhan and Raju. Originally, the roles initially went to John Abraham and Saif Ali Khan, but the actors rejected the film due to date issues. Arshad Warsi, who also collaborated with Hirani in the two Munnai Bhai films, auditioned but could not take up the role. Before R. Madhavan was cast, Bangalore-based Rajeev Ravindranathan shot for his character for two months before his scenes were removed in favour of casting a "known face". Ravindranathan later played a college senior. On being questioned about casting older actors to play the titular college students, Hirani said in an interview to Rediff that "the actors chosen have that quality which he wanted for the film apart from the body language, mannerisms and innocence portrayed on-screen".

The team approached Sanjay Dutt, with whom Hirani worked in the Munna Bhai film series, to play the role of the main antagonist Dr. Viru Sahastrabuddhe, but for various reasons the role went to Boman Irani. The character name was considered to be unique due to the look, lisp and mannerisms portrayed, and also got the nickname "Virus", as students give names to their professors and principals in their school and college life. For the preparation of his role, Boman wore costumes made of cheap fabric, designed by an old tailor who stitches clothes for Parsis in Dadar (North-Central Mumbai). He wore the shirt with velcro attached, and a hook tie; with the same look, he attended the shoot to prepare for his role. Initially, Boman was hesitant to act in that film and had recommended his co-actor Irrfan Khan for Viru Sahastrabuddhe, but his refusal prompted Boman to take up the role. This was revealed by Boman after Khan's death in April 2020.

After talks with Kajol fell through, Kareena Kapoor played the role of Pia Sahastrabuddhe, Rancho's (Aamir) love interest and a medical student. While Hirani refused about the original casting for her role in the film in his interview, it has been regarded that Anushka Sharma was originally considered for the role. In April 2021, an old video of Anushka's audition for the film went viral on the internet. Anushka, then a newcomer, shared monologues recited by Gracy Singh from Munna Bhai M.B.B.S. for the audition process, supposing to be her debut in films, but was ultimately rejected by the producers. She later made her debut in the Yash Raj Films' production Rab Ne Bana Di Jodi (2008), being cast opposite Shah Rukh Khan.

Omi Vaidya, an American actor, was cast for the role Chathur Ramalingam (Silencer)".

Ali Fazal, then, a rookie actor, played a small role as Joy Lobo in the film. While speaking about his role, Fazal stated that "he went into depression as the character arc seemed to mirror a tragic real-life incident". (Note: Ali Fazal later appeared in several Indian and Hollywood projects, and also gained breakthrough by the Indian web series Mirzapur.)

Javed Jaffrey played a cameo appearance as the real Ranchoddas Chanchad.

=== Filming ===
The rehearsals for the film began prior to the shoot, followed by script reading and look tests. After extensive pre-production works, principal photography for the film began on 28 July 2008, with scenes featuring the supporting cast shot first. On 29 August 2008, shooting for the key schedule began with the principal cast members. The first scene was shot in an aircraft with Madhavan, which was the first shooting schedule for this film in Mumbai. The team left to Shimla, for a 20-day schedule with the crew and cast comprising Khan and Kapoor, and later headed to Ladakh. The climax was shot at the Pangong Tso lake in Ladakh. The team took a break following Aamir Khan's activities in the promotions and post-production works of Ghajini (2008). According to Wangchuk, the production attempted to get permission to shoot at the Phey campus of his organisation, Students' Educational and Cultural Movement of Ladakh, but was denied permission due to their excessive use of plastic. The scenes were shot at the Druk White Lotus School instead.

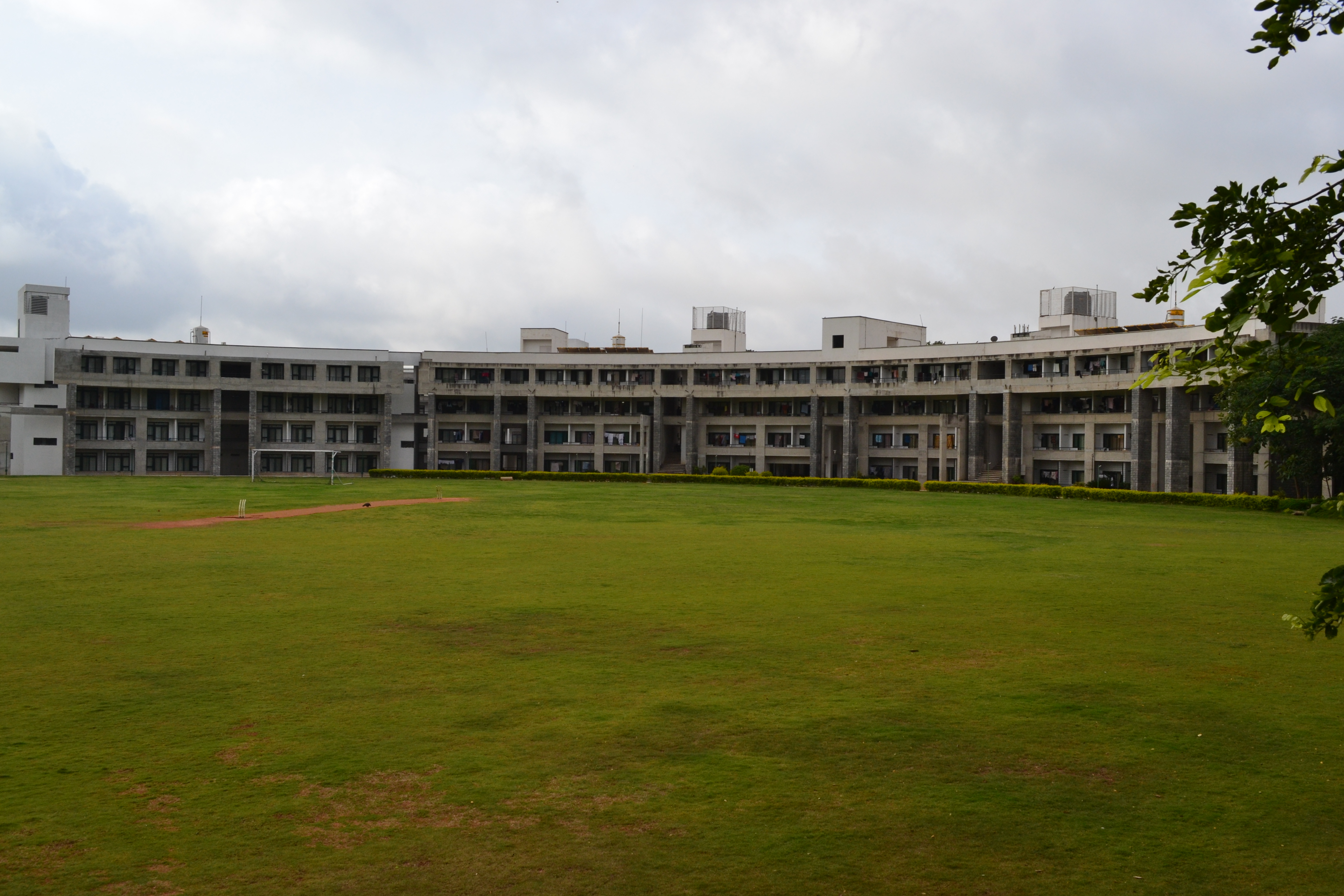
The Indian Institute of Management, Bangalore served as Imperial College of Engineering, for this film.

In December 2008, the entire cast and crew, including Khan, Madhavan, Joshi and Hirani, headed to Indian Institute of Management, Bangalore campus which served as Imperial College of Engineering. To prepare for the roles, the crew members stayed at the institution's dormitory blocks and at the college hostel. Though Khan saw the pictures of the location, he decided to see the location for real and wanted to stay at the hostel, in order to get through the role. Khan regularly met the students during the morning and evenings and shared the experiences of studies and way of life. Apart from that, the team eventually mingled with the students while Khan also involved in many indoor and outdoor games. While shooting for the film, the team made extra precautions with none of the shooting process might affect the routine class sessions. It was the first film to be shot at the Indian Institutes of Management Group, and the university granted an academic pay-off for itself. After shooting is completed, the makers will film a documentary on the institution. Few parts in Bangalore were doubled as New Delhi for the film. The entire shooting process was completed within February 2009. The entire film was shot in reverse, with the present-day scenes shot first and the college scenes were shot later.

C. K. Muraleedharan was the cinematographer for 3 Idiots, after collaborating with Hirani for Lage Raho Munna Bhai (2006). He used Arricam Lite (LT) camera for shooting the film, which consisted of Angenieux Optimo Anamorphic Lenses and Zeiss Master Prime Lenses, with the film had a distributed aspect ratio of 2.39:1. Rajkumar Hirani also undertook supervision of editing the film. For the scene where the leads get drunk and break in Virus' house, Aamir suggested that the actors might get drunk in reality so as to make it look convincing, but, however, the actors went on numerous retakes, which even exhausted the stock of film roll. The actors continued to do retakes, until the new rolls have been bought, so as to keep them busy. The pregnancy scene was initially supposed to be placed in Hirani's debut film Munna Bhai M.B.B.S. (2003), but as he felt that the placement was irrelevant in the film, the team decided against doing so, and then was used in this film. The hospital scenes were shot at Fortis Hospital (Noida).

The film uses real inventions, with brains behind these innovations include Remya Jose, a student from Kerala, who created the pedal operated washing-machine; Mohammad Idris, a barber from Hasanpur Kalan in Meerut district in Uttar Pradesh, who invented a bicycle-powered horse clipper; and Jahangir Painter, a painter from Maharashtra, who made the scooter-powered flour mill.

== Music ==
The film's soundtrack is composed by Shantanu Moitra with lyrics penned by Swanand Kirkire. It marked Moitra's second consecutive collaboration with Rajkumar Hirani after Lage Raho Munna Bhai (2006), whose music album was successful. Besides composing the songs, Moitra also composed the film score with Sanjay Wandrekar and Atul Raninga. The album was created with the inspiration of Moitra's college days, with the songs been written in consideration on the mindset of youngsters in India.

The album features five original compositions. Two tracks from the album were remixed, despite Moitra not liking the trend of remixing film songs. Sonu Nigam rendered five out of seven tracks from the album. Other singers performing vocals to the songs are Shaan, Shreya Ghoshal, Suraj Jagan, the lyricist Kirkire and composer Moitra themselves, recording for the soundtrack. One of the tracks "Give Me Some Sunshine" was sung by one of the lead actors, Sharman Joshi, in his maiden attempt in playback singing. The music album was released online (instead of a launch event), by the film's official website on 27 November 2009, with a video chat featuring the cast and crew members. T-Series purchased the music rights of the film at an amount of ₹120 million (US$2.48 million).

The album received positive reviews from critics, with praise directed towards Moitra's composition and the quality of the album. In addition, the soundtrack became the highest-selling Bollywood soundtrack of 2009, according to the trade website Box Office India, despite the decline in sales of conventional music CDs. Due to the internet boom, it became the "most downloaded Bollywood music album of the year". "Aal Izz Well" was listed as one of the "Top 10 Bollywood Songs of 2009" and became a sensation among the youngsters. The soundtrack further fetched a number of accolades is considered as one of Moitra's best albums, along with Parineeta (2005) and Lage Raho Munna Bhai (2006).

== Release ==
=== Statistics ===
3 Idiots released on 25 December 2009 over 1550 prints and 1760 screens in India, which was considered to be a "wide domestic release for a Bollywood film" at that time, according to trade analysts. Major multiplexes allotted more than 95% of screens for the film, prior to the release. It also had a wide-overseas release with about 344 prints in 415 screens. However, Bollywood Hungama and The Times of India reported that the film had got about 342–366 screens. The film's wide-release in about 32 countries was noted by trade analysts, who wondered whether it would slow down the business of James Cameron's Avatar (2009), which was breaking box-office records. Producer Vinod Chopra said that a multiplex in Australia reduced the shows for Avatar, so that it could play 3 Idiots.

Following its domestic success, 3 Idiots was screened in East Asian markets. It was released in Taiwan on 17 December 2010, followed by Hong Kong on 1 September 2011 and mainland China on 15 December 2011. In South Korea, it was released on 29 December 2011. Along with the original Hindi version, a Mandarin Chinese–dubbed version was also released, with Tang Wei voicing Pia, and Huang Bo voicing Rancho. In January 2013, the film was distributed by Apex Entertainment and CJ Entertainment to release the film in the Korean markets and was released on 25 January 2013. Following its success in other Asian markets, Japanese distributor Nikkatsu announced plans to release the film in Japan. It was released there in June 2013, under the Japanese title Kitto, Umaku Iku (きっと、うまくいく; lit. "It'll go well").

=== Screenings ===
In November 2009, Aamir Khan invited hundreds of people to watch the first half of the film exclusively in a basis of Non-disclosure Agreement. 3 Idiots, thereby being the first film in Bollywood to use this clause, which was prevalent in Hollywood; the lead actor asked people to share the opinions about the film. The premiere show for the film was held in Mumbai on 23 December 2009. Along with the film's cast and crew, the event saw the presence of Anil Kapoor, Yash Chopra, Karan Johar, Shah Rukh Khan, Salman Khan and Saif Ali Khan among many others and other named celebrities, including Hirani's earlier collaborators such as Sanjay Dutt, Vidya Balan, Arshad Warsi and Dia Mirza. Amitabh Bachchan who had earlier confirmed his presence at the premiere ultimately did not turn up in the end. The special premiere in United States and Canada were held on 24 December, prior to the Indian release. On 30 January 2010, a special screening of the film was conducted to the veteran actor Dilip Kumar. He constantly followed the news of the film and wanted to watch it in a theatre, but due to his health condition, he could not get out of his home. Later, Chopra and Hirani expressed Dilip's wish and agreed to conduct a private screening for the actor. Chopra said that he "really moved after seeing the film and felt nostalgic". Later, he urged to discuss about the film and its making with Chopra and Hirani at the former's apartment in Bandra, with the discussion went on for two hours.

On 19 May 2010, the film was screened at the Headquarters of the United Nations in New York, with Rajkumar Hirani and the film's team attending the screening. The members of the United Nations, came in touch with the producer regarding the screening of the film, following its influence in youngsters about the Indian education system. More than 700 invitees, including non-Indians, turned up for the screening, despite the hall had capacity for about 600-650 people. A two-hour long post-screening session was conducted to the attendees to focus on "how the film has impacted mindsets". The film was screened at the Indian Film Festival of Melbourne in March 2010, to bridging the cultural gap between India and Australia, following the Violence against Indians in Australia during late-January 2010. It may also help Bollywood markets to screen their film in Australia. The film was screened at the Aruba International Film Festival held on 10 June 2010.

At the Indian Film Festival of London, held during 25–29 August 2010, the film was screened along with Chopra's other five films — An Encounter with Faces (1978); Parinda (1989); 1942: A Love Story (1993) and Eklavya: The Royal Guard (2007), while further honouring an award for Chopra. A charity screening of the film was also held with the proceedings being contributed to UNICEF. At the inauguration of Vidhu Vinod Chopra film festival, to honour the director-producer, 3 Idiots along with the director's other films, Eklavya: The Royal Guard, Mission Kashmir and the Munna Bhai film series, were screened at the festival on 30 March 2012. 3 Idiots became one of the few Indian films screened at the inaugural Indian Film Festival held in Ho Chi Minh City (Vietnam) in December 2015. The film was further screened at the inaugural Himalayan Film Festival held during 24–28 September 2021 in Ladakh.

=== Marketing ===
Aamir Khan used innovative marketing strategies for the promotions of the films, in order to gain wide exposure among audience. Anil Arjun, the CEO of Reliance MediaWorks which produced and distributed the film had stated that, a 40-member team was put in place to market the film four months prior to the release. He said that "the campaign was made such a way that it appeals to all category of viewers — people who are going to multiplexes in metros and single screens in small towns". The film was shown to all stakeholders and the company employees prior to the release, and a 360-degree marketing campaign was made after the release, which covered digital, outdoor, brand partnerships, public relations and merchandise.

The "butt chairs" used by the actors in the film were placed at leading multiplex chains for public viewing. The makers teamed up with Zapak.com for digital promotions, with firstly the official website titled idiotsacademy.com was launched and the lead cast came with video chatting to the fans. The website designed keeping in mind the college atmosphere and few special added features. The team later interacted with fans through video conference during the online music launch. Khan travelled across India on a two-promotional tour. On the website, an alternate reality game called "Track Aamir" was launched, to track the whereabouts of the actor during this tour. The site had over 600,000 unique visitors within two weeks. During this tour, Aamir Khan invited 24 friends personally to attend the premiere held in Mumbai, prior to the release of the film. Prior to the release promos for the film was unveiled in an event attended by the lead actors and the crew associated in the film, and press conferences streamed in seven countries. The online promos, trailer, video songs and interviews were released in YouTube.

Reliance Life Insurance started a campaign based on the song "All Is Well" and promoted it in television channels, radio stations and hoardings featuring the lead actors of the film. The makers started marketing alliances with Pantaloons Fashion and Retail, to launch their exclusive apparel and accessories collection. The special T-shirts with Khan's scribblings as designs imprinted on it, was available in 45 Pantaloons stores, which were priced ₹399. The collection also included replicas of T-shirts, garments and jewellery used by the leads in the film. As a part of promotions in Facebook, the handle called "Pucca Idiot" was launched prior to the release, which generated 10,000 followers within 24 hours. In PVR Cinemas, the film's marketing team painted on washrooms, with the slogan "You are an idiot". Another promotional event titled "Sabse Big Idiot" was held, with the leads being present at 92.7 Big FM, asking viewers to show their idiocy. As a part of outdoor promotions, carried by Primesite Marketing Agency, innovations in hoardings, bus shelters, bus backs, platform signages and mobile vans attracted audiences. Stickers with the film's logo was pasted in 10,000 auto rickshaws that moved in cities.

Trade analysts believed that the unique promotional activity helped in the massive success of the box-office breaking several records, and also creating a nationwide impact. At the Business Standard Brand Derby summit, held at the Leela Kempinski hotel in Gurgaon on 16 July 2010, the film topped the 2009 Brand Derby, due to the unique promotions of the film.

=== Piracy ===
In addition to encourage people watching the film in theatres, Reliance MediaWorks' marketing team managed to destroy more than 2.1 million illegal downloads. The team had its core-group working in India, United States and United Kingdom, tracked and destroyed pirated versions of the film in physical and online formats, and also issued trade notices, warning letters specific to prospective infringing sites and outlets across the overseas sectors. On 26 December 2009, a day after the film's release, the social service branch conducted a raid near Bandra station and over 2500 pirated CDs and DVDs, with 69 DVDs of this film, along with other films Avatar and Paa, were seized. In New Delhi, the sales of pirated DVDs of the film were stopped after a subsidiary company of Reliance Anil Dhirubhai Ambani Group (R-ADAG), levied a complaint to the officials to take actions against movie piracy. After the raid conducted by the police in several locations across Mumbai, former IPS officer Aftab Ahmed Khan, said that "We execute everything keeping the system in mind. We have the support of the local police so there is no question of going against the system. Piracy always existed in some form or the other. But we are getting the facts and figures only now as there are industry body who are working together to bring this menace in the forefront. To curb piracy in the long run we will have to constantly work towards means and ways to fight it."

=== Television and home media ===
The television rights of the film were purchased by Sony Pictures Networks for ₹22 crore (US$4.54 million), which was the highest bid during that time. The film made its television debut on 25 July 2010, with promotions for the television premiere cost ₹2.2 lakh (US$4,811.25) and had attracted 12 popular sponsors to market the film. It drew an audience of 39 million viewers in India, and had attracted a TVR of 13.1 at the metro cities Delhi, Mumbai and Kolkata and an overall TVR of 10.1 domestically. The cumulative reach of the film was uplifted to 30.5%. It also helped the broadcaster, Sony MAX to the third position among the general entertainment channels during that month.

On 27 August 2010, Reliance Big Entertainment launched the standard DVD and VCD editions of the film through Reliance Big Home Video. It was coincided at an event held during Grand Hyatt at Mumbai, with the presence of the cast and crew members and was broadcast live on Facebook and Twitter. Later, on 1 October 2010, Reliance Big Home Video launched the premium version of the VCD and DVD, that included a 24-page sticker book and special "idioticomic" book, priced at ₹499. It eventually sold 75,000–80,000 copies upon its launch, thereby generating a revenue of ₹30–40 million (US$400,000–530,000). A month later, the special Blu-ray disc edition was launched on 5 November 2010.

In order to curb piracy, producer Chopra and Hirani stated that the film will be released and downloaded legally through YouTube on 25 March 2010, twelve weeks after its theatrical release. It was attempted for the people who cannot afford to go to multiplexes or single screens, thereby 3 Idiots becoming the first Indian film to have a legal release on YouTube. However, the film did not release as planned on that day due to copyright issues. Officially, it was released on YouTube in May 2012, but its access has since been restricted. However, it has been made available for online streaming on multiple platforms such as Netflix, Amazon Prime Video and Sony LIV. Later as Reliance Big Pictures Vinod Chopra Films signed a deal with JioStar.

== Reception ==
3 Idiots received widespread critical acclaim upon release from both domestic and international critics, with praise directed towards its direction, themes, humour, story, screenplay, soundtrack and performances of the cast.

=== India ===
Subhash K. Jha stated: "It's not that 3 Idiots is a flawless work of art. But it is a vital, inspiring, and life-revising work of contemporary art with some heart imbued into every part. In a country where students are driven to suicide by their impossible curriculum, 3 Idiots provides hope. Maybe cinema can't save lives. But cinema, sure as hell, can make you feel life is worth living. 3 Idiots does just that, and much more. The director takes the definition of entertainment into directions of social comment". Nikhat Kazmi of The Times of India gave it four and a half stars and suggests that, "The film is a laugh riot, despite being high on fundas [...] Hirani carries forward his simplistic 'humanism alone works' philosophy of the Munnabhai series in 3 Idiots too, making it a warm and vivacious signature tune to 2009. The second half of the film does falter in parts, especially the childbirth sequence, but it doesn't take long for the film to jump back on track."

Mayank Shekhar of the Hindustan Times gave the film three and a half out of five stars and comments that "this is the sort of movie you'll take home with a smile and a song on your lips." Taran Adarsh of Bollywood Hungama gave 3 Idiots four and a half out of five stars and states: "On the whole, 3 Idiots easily ranks amongst Aamir, Rajkumar Hirani and Vidhu Vinod Chopra's finest films. Do yourself and your family a favour: Watch 3 Idiots. It's emotional, it's entertaining, it's enlightening. The film has tremendous youth appeal and feel-good factor to work in a big way." Kaveree Bamzai of India Today gave 3 Idiots five stars and argues that "it's a lovely story, of a man from nowhere who wanted to learn, told like a fairy tale, with the secret heart carrying its coded message of setting all of us free."

Sonia Chopra of Sify gave the film 3 stars and said "Though a bit too calculated and designed, 3 Idiots is still an ok option for the significant message, interesting cast and scattered breezy moments." Rajeev Masand of CNN-IBN gave the film three out of five stars and states: "Going home after watching 3 Idiots I felt like I'd just been to my favorite restaurant only to be a tad underwhelmed by their signature dish. It was a satisfying meal, don't get me wrong, but not the best meal I'd been expecting." Shubhra Gupta from The Indian Express also gave it 3 stars, stating "3 Idiots does not do as much for me. The emotional truth that shone through both the Munnabhai movies doesn't come through strongly enough." Raja Sen of Rediff gave the film two out of five stars and states: "Rajkumar Hirani's one of the directors of the decade, a man with immense talent and a knack for storytelling. On his debut, he hit a hundred. With his second, he hit a triple century. This time, he fishes outside the off stump, tries to play shots borrowed from other batters, and hits and misses to provide a patchy, 32*-type innings. It's okay, boss, chalta hai. (Note: A Hindi phrase roughly translating to "it will do") Even Sachin has an off day, and we still have great hope."

=== Overseas ===
On the review aggregator website Rotten Tomatoes, 100% of 15 critics' reviews are positive, with an average rating of 7.3/10. Derek Elley of Variety wrote that "3 Idiots takes a while to lay out its game plan but pays off emotionally in its second half." Robert Abele of Los Angeles Times wrote that there's an "unavoidable joie de vivre (symbolised by Rancho's meditative mantra 'All is well') and a performance charm that makes this one of the more naturally gregarious Bollywood imports." Louis Proyect described it as a "fabulous achievement across the board. A typical Bollywood confection but also a social commentary on a dysfunctional engineering school system that pressures huge numbers of students into suicide."

The film was praised by critics in East Asia and Southeast Asia. South China Morning Post wrote that the film "wraps a heavy message in light comedy. It is satire at its best, a powerful indictment of India's education system in which students cram for exams while stifling their dreams." Chaerim Oh of KAIST Herald wrote that "the film never harshly denounces the educational system but instead uncovers disturbing truths and unseen consequences of tremendous pressure upon students" and that "if you don't end up crying like I did (or won't admit that you did), you'll still enjoy the movie." In Japan, Yuri Wakabayashi of Eiga also gave the film a positive review.

== Box office ==
=== Pre-release ===
The film was made at the budget of ₹55 crore (US$11.36 million), while Indo-Asian News Service estimated the budget to be around ₹35–45 crore (US$4.6–6.0 million). In August 2009, Reliance Big Pictures acquired the worldwide distribution rights of the film, along with the Hrithik Roshan-starrer Kites (2010) for ₹140 crore (US$28.92 million). Individually, the worldwide theatrical rights were sold for about ₹65 crore (US$13.43 million). After its theatrical run, the producers of the film negotiated deals with leading satellite television channels, with Sony Pictures Networks acquiring the film for ₹22 crore (US$4.54 million), a record during that period. The music rights were sold to Super Cassettes Industries (T-Series) for ₹12 crore (US$2.48 million). Excluding the print and advertisement costs, the film made a business ₹99 crore (US$20.45 million), even before the theatrical release.

The makers entered into tussles with the distributors as Khan insisted to sell the film's distribution rights at a tune of ₹100 crore (US$20.66 million); the distribution rights of the actor's previous film Ghajini (2008) was sold for ₹93 crore (US$21.38 million). Following the financial turmoil, which affected the footfalls and earnings in multiplexes and single-screens, the stakeholders were not ready to buy the film for a huge amount, and reduce the price for distribution. After much deliberations, the theatrical rights were being sold at a tune of ₹40–45 crore (US$5.3–6.0 million). Reliance Big had also levied the deal to ₹20 crore (US$4.13 million) for home video release.

3 Idiots, eventually topped online polls of the "most-awaited film of the year", with the extensive marketing campaign and pre-release contributed to it. The advance bookings of the film eventually topped to 40–45%, with major multiplexes showing advance bookings rates uplifted to more than 90% in the opening day. Amitabh Vardhan, CEO of PVR Cinemas and Alok Tandon of INOX Leisure Limited, stated that "looking at the pre-release hype, the film will have the best openings of a movie this year in terms of theatrical revenues", while trade analyst Taran Adarsh stated that "it could be easily one of the biggest blockbusters of the year".

=== Box office ===
The film's worldwide lifetime gross was ₹460 crore (US$90 million), making it the highest-grossing Indian film at the time. The film was listed in Guinness World Records for the record of highest box office film gross for a Bollywood film. As of 2020, the collections are equivalent to ₹980 crore (US$132.25 million), adjusted to inflation. The success of the film was attributed to the content and the extensive pre-release promotions, which led to an increase in the huge number of footfalls.

The film created the highest collection record for paid previews with ₹2.75 crore that time, which was broken by Chennai Express (2013). In its four-day first weekend, the film netted ₹38 crore (equivalent to ₹104 crore or US$11 million in 2026), and broke the record held by Ghajini (Aamir's previous film) for the first weekend collections. By the first week, the film netted ₹79 crore (equivalent to ₹217 crore or US$23 million in 2026), again breaking the box office record held by Ghajini. 3 Idiots had nett grossed ₹56 crore (equivalent to ₹154 crore or US$16 million in 2026) in its second week, ₹30.3 crore (equivalent to ₹83 crore or US$8.9 million in 2026) during the third week, ₹16 crore (equivalent to ₹44 crore or US$4.7 million in 2026) in its fourth week and ₹9.75 crore (equivalent to ₹27 crore or US$2.9 million in 2026) in fifth to make a total of ₹202 crore (equivalent to ₹554 crore or US$59 million in 2026) in five weeks. 3 Idiots, thereby became the first Indian film ever to collect this huge amount, hence established the ₹200 crore (US$41.32 million) Club. Its final domestic gross in India was ₹273 crore (equivalent to ₹749 crore or US$80 million in 2026).

3 Idiots became the then highest-grossing Indian film in overseas markets, with an overseas gross of US$30.5 million (₹186 crore) until it was beaten by Dhoom 3 (2013). Its first weekend opening collection overseas was $4 million. It set record collections for Indian-produced films in territories such as the United States and Australia. In the United States, the film earned $6.5 million since its opening, in addition to over $2.5 million in the United Kingdom, over $2 million in Canada, and nearly $1 million in Australia. 3 Idiots has the biggest first week total in the US with around $3 million over its first four days.

3 Idiots became a success in East Asian markets, which was unusual for an Indian film at that time. The film had a fragmented but wide release in East Asian markets including China, South Korea and Hong Kong. The film had the longest showing period at cinemas in Taiwan, for more than two months from December 2010, breaking the record of Avatar (2009) with over NT$10 million (US$629,024) grossed. 3 Idiots was the first aired Indian film in Hong Kong, where it grossed HK$22 million at the box office during its showing from 1 September 2011 through January 2012, the equivalent of US$3.02 million. It was the 14th highest-grossing film of 2011 at the Hong Kong box office. In South Korea, the film grossed ₩3,416,415,900 (US$3,084,647). The film was number-one at the South Korean box office for five weeks, drawing an audience of 459,686 viewers.

In China, where it is known as 《三傻大闹宝莱坞》 ("3 idiots make a scene in Bollywood"), the film grossed ₹11 crore (US$2.36 million) in 2 weeks in December 2011, eventually crossing the $3 million mark within a month, as of 5 January 2012. Upon its release in the Japanese market in June 2013, it went on to collect around ¥100 million (₹6.1 crore) in its first two weeks of run, making it the highest-grossing Hindi film ever in Japan. By the end of 2013, it had grossed ¥150 million (US$1.6 million) in Japan, before ending its run with a lifetime total of ¥170 million ($1.74 million) in Japan. The film's final gross in East Asian markets was US$11,333,671 (₹69.2 crore).

== Accolades ==
3 Idiots won 58 accolades from Indian film awards; among these are six Filmfare Awards including Best Film and Best Director, three National Film Awards including Best Popular Film, ten Star Screen Awards, seventeen IIFA Awards, five GIMA Awards, two Apsara Awards and seven Bollywood Hungama Surfers Choice Movie Awards. In addition, the film received a nomination and award for Worst Song to the track "All Izz Well" at the Ghanta Awards, despite the track being a nationwide sensation among the younger generation.

In China, it was nominated for the Best Foreign Film prize at the first Beijing International Film Festival in 2011. In Japan, it was nominated in the Best Outstanding Foreign Language Film category at the 37th Japan Academy Awards in 2014; the award was eventually won by Les Misérables. In addition, 3 Idiots won the Grand Prize at the 4th Videoyasan Awards, held by a Japanese organisation of home video retailers in 2014; 3 Idiots was selected as 2013's best video release, beating thousands of films, anime and television shows, including domestic Japanese and foreign Hollywood productions.

== Cultural impact and legacy ==
In 2023, Time Out ranked it 13th on its list of the "100 Best Bollywood Movies." The film is also considered among the best films made on friendship. Film Companion added Omi Vaidya's character, in its "50 Memorable Bollywood Characters" list.

=== Social impact ===
The film had a social impact on attitudes to education in Asia, including education in India. The overwhelming success and impact in Indian society led to many authors and analysts to take a case study on the film and the message portrayed. It was also noted for the "realistic portrayal and depiction of universities, colleges and students". According to Jason Mecchi of Midstory, the film "may have even played a role in the recent reorganization of the Indian education system, designed to reduce tedium and allow children to grow in multiple fields of study, rather than those that conform to a narrow idea of success."

The film has had a similar social impact on education in other Asian countries, including education in China. Chinese universities were "even prescribing the film in their coursework as a kind of stress-relief in their classrooms. The movie has served as a question bank for many local, family, zonal and national quizzes." At the ninth edition of Chennai International Film Festival held in December 2011, Naichi Ho, the director of Taipei Economic and Cultural Centre in New Delhi expressed about the phenomenal success of 3 Idiots, saying "Five years ago no one in Taiwan watched Indian movies. The education system in our country is the same as in India. Every parent wants their children to go to the best school and there is a lot of pressure on the kids. So it's a hit among youngsters there".

The unmanned aerial vehicle (drone) featured in the film was developed by Ankit Mehta, Rahul Singh and Ashish Bhat. This led to them receiving a $20 million contract to manufacture drones for the Indian Army. The Nitesh Tiwari directorial Chhichhore (2019) has a resemblance to this film.

=== Overseas markets ===
When 3 Idiots released in China, the country was only the 15th largest film market, partly due to China's widespread pirate DVD distribution at the time. However, it was the pirate market that introduced 3 Idiots to most Chinese audiences, becoming a cult film in the country among youths. Aamir Khan gained a large growing Chinese fanbase as a result. By 2013, China grew to become the world's second-largest film market (after the United States), paving the way for Aamir Khan's Chinese box office success, with Dhoom 3 (2013), PK (2014), Dangal (2016) and Secret Superstar (2017). In 2011, a documentary film titled Big in Bollywood was released, which revolves about Omi Vaidya's journey from a struggling Hollywood actor to a successful Bollywood breakthrough with this film.

As of 2017, 3 Idiots has been ranked China's 12th favourite film of all time according to ratings on popular Chinese film review site Douban, with only one domestic Chinese film (Farewell My Concubine) ranked higher. The film holds an average rating of 9.2 on Douban, with over 1.15 million votes. As of 2021, the film is ranked at No. 14 on the list with mostly youth voting. On the Korean site Naver, audiences gave the film an average rating of 9.4/10, and it is one of the top 30 highest-rated films on the site.

One reason for its success in East Asian markets such as China and Hong Kong is because of their similar education systems, thus many students were able to identify with the characters. Chaerim Oh of KAIST Herald wrote that the "popularity of the movie, particularly in South Korea, can be traced back to the national background of the overly competitive education system. In Korea, students of all ages – from young elementary children to university graduate students – are trained to study under overwhelming pressure and extremely high academic standards. In short, this movie is, really, our own story."

In 2013, Hollywood filmmaker Steven Spielberg praised 3 Idiots, which he had seen three times and said he "loved the emotional undertones". He listed it as one of five films that he connects with, along with The Godfather (1972) and his own work on E.T. the Extra-Terrestrial (1982), Saving Private Ryan (1998) and Jaws (1975). The Japanese anime series Gamers! (2017) references a scene from 3 Idiots, in the final episode of the series. A poster of 3 Idiots appears in the Korean drama series Welcome to Waikiki (2018).

== Remakes ==
Shortly after the film's success, Gemini Film Circuit had purchased the remake rights of the film to be adapted in Tamil and Telugu-languages. Shankar directing the Tamil version of the film, his first remake he worked on his career. After several considerations for the leads in the remake, the team approached Vijay, Srikanth and Jiiva to reprise the roles played by Khan, Madhavan and Joshi, while Ileana D'Cruz essayed to reprise Kapoor's role from the film. The film, which was titled as Nanban, released on 12 January 2012 to positive reviews. For the Telugu remake, the team considered Ram Charan for the titular role same disclosed by the actor in his speech of movie promotions in Hyderabad, but the project did not materialise. Nanban was later dubbed in Telugu as Snehitudu and released two weeks after the original version. The film was remade in Mexican Spanish-language named 3 idiotas and was released in May 2017. A Hollywood-remake of this film was announced but did not come into fruition.

== Controversies ==
=== Chetan Bhagat story credit ===
Initially, I did sit down with Raju and Abhijat while they were deciding to make a film based on '5 Point Someone'. I even went to IIT with Abhijat a couple of times. But it was just not possible for me to be involved at every stage of the screenplay writing process since I was in Hong Kong at that time, working full-time, and busy writing other books. Moreover, Abhijat is based in the USA, Raju was in the US for quite a while working on the screenplay but it was not practical for me to do that [...] The film retains the soul of the book. 3 Idiots is different from the book but at the same time, it does borrow many things from the book. The core theme and message of the film are coming from the book itself. And that's why the makers have officially credited the film as 'Based on a novel by Chetan Bhagat.'

— Chetan Bhagat, explaining about the novel's connection with the film, in an interview a day after its release.

A controversy developed a few days after the release over the fact that Chetan's credit, "Based on the novel Five Point Someone by Chetan Bhagat" appeared in the closing credits rather than in the opening ones. At that time, Bhagat stated that he "was expecting an opening credit and I was quite surprised on not seeing it. They had bought the rights, made the payment, and committed to a credit in the contract. It's there, but it's not about it being there, it's about the placement and the prominence." In a 31 December 2009 blog post on his personal website, Bhagat stated that he was told the movie was only 2–5% based on the book, but when he saw it, he felt that it was 70% of the book. He also argued that he was misled by the makers of the film, though he noted, that "this has nothing to do with Mr. Aamir Khan [...] I am a big fan of Aamir and he has made my story reach people. However, he was told by the makers not to read the book, and he hasn't. Thus, he cannot comment on the issue in a meaningful manner."

A few people responded to Chetan's statements. According to the Indo-Asian News Service (IANS) producer Vidhu Vinod Chopra clarified that "in the agreement between the producer and Bhagat, it was clearly mentioned that the author's name would be put in the closing credits". IANS also reported that Chopra "lost his cool" and "asked a reporter to shut up after being questioned whether his hit 3 Idiots was lifted from author Chetan Bhagat's book Five Point Someone." Chopra later apologised, stating: "I really think I'm silly. I was provoked, but I shouldn't have done this. I saw myself on TV and saw how I was shouting 'shut up, shut up' like an animal. I told myself — 'what nonsensical behaviour'." Aamir Khan also responded to these claims. Rajkumar Hirani stated that "We have officially bought the rights for the film. We drew a contract with him and it clearly mentions the position of his credit. With open eyes, he had seen the contract, consulted his lawyer, and signed the agreement [...] In the contract, we have said that the title would be given in the rolling credits. We haven't changed the font size. We haven't increased the speed of the title. It's exactly there where it was agreed to be." Chetan Bhagat later apologised stating, "I definitely do not have anything against team 3 Idiots. I may have some issues with the mistake they may have made but nothing about their personality or the kind of people they are. I apologize to their families if there was any distress caused to them. I also want to thank all my fans, who stood by me but I don't want them to turn against anyone especially Aamir."

=== Concerns about content ===
On 28 December 2010, the non-governmental organisation, Coalition to Uproot Ragging from Education (CURE) co-founder Harsh Agarwal wrote a letter to the Raghavan Committee, a panel headed by former HRD Ministry R. K. Raghavan, explaining distress over a particular scene, where the lead actors gets ragged by seniors. The organisation asked the committee to write a letter to the censor board to revisit and re-examine the particular scene. The Bharatiya Janata Party, Maharashtra state spokesperson Madhav Bhandari demanded that the film should be sent for re-certification again in concern with that scene, after an incident in Seth G.S. Medical College was inspired by that scene, with the Chief minister of Maharashtra, Ashok Chavan too demanded the same. Aamir Khan, however, said that the film is against "ragging".

In an article published in Economic and Political Weekly, Latika Gupta mentions that the film has serious problems when seen from the gender perspective, in particular, that it follows the trend set by the 2007 film Jab We Met in its use of women's sexual vulnerability to create sensation and humour. In one scene, students, professors, and the chief guest are seen bursting with laughter hearing a speech where the word balatkar (rape) figures 21 times and the word stan (breast) four times (in the English subtitles for international release, the words "screwed" and "bosom" are used instead).

== Sequel ==
Director Rajkumar Hirani said in 2015, 2016, and 2018 that he was exploring ideas for a sequel to 3 Idiots. A few years later, in a February 2026 interview with Variety India, Hirani said that he is still working on scripts for 3 Idiots and Lage Raho Munna Bhai sequels.

In April 2026, Aamir Khan revealed that Rajkumar Hirani "is working on 3 Idiots 2 right now. I’ve heard the story and it’s wonderful...The script still needs some work, but the story itself is really good, unusual, with the same humour as the first film. It follows the characters from 3 Idiots, picking up 10 years later." Aamir Khan will be reprising his role as Phunsukh Wangdu in the film.

== See also ==
- List of highest-grossing Bollywood films
- List of Bollywood highest-grossing films in overseas markets
