= List of schools in Brunei =

Below is a list of schools in the Southeast Asian country of Brunei. The list includes both government and private primary, secondary and tertiary schools. Muslim students below a certain age are also expected to attend classes in religious institutions after the normal schooling hours.

== Primary schools ==
=== Government schools ===
==== Brunei I District schools ====
- SR Bendahara Lama
- SR Dato Godam (closed 2014)
- SR Datu Ahmad
- SR Haji Tarif
- SR Mabohai
- SR Pap Besar
- SR Pehin Dato Jamil
- SR Pintu Malim
- SR Pusar Ulak
- SR Raja Isteri Fatimah
- SR Saba Darat
- SR Pengiran Anak teri Besar, Sungai Kebun
- SR Sungai Siamas
- SR Sungraila Siamas

==== Brunei II District schools ====
- SR Amar Pahlawan
- SR Anggerek Desa
- SR Batu Marang
- SR Berakas Garrisen
- SR Dato Basir
- SR Datu Gandi (closed)
- SR Dato Marsal
- SR Delima Satu
- SR DMW Lambak
- SR HMS Sungai Hanching
- SR Lambak Kiri
- SR Mentiri
- SR OKBI Subok
- SR Pantai Berakas ABDB
- SR PTL Muara
- SR Pulaie
- SR YSHHB
- SR SAB Sungai Besar
- SR Serasa
- SR Suas Muara
- SR Tanah Jambu

==== Brunei III District schools ====
- SR Bendahara Sakam Bunut
- SR Bengkurong
- SR HMJ Maun Kiulap
- SR Jerudong
- SR Katok 'A'
- SR Kg Mata-Mata
- SR Kiarong
- SR Mulaut
- SR OKSB Kilanas
- SR PPSD Sahibul Bandar
- SR Sengkurong
- SR Telanai
- SR Tungku
- SR Rimba 1
- SR Rimba 2
- SR Rimba 3
- SR kati mahar

==== Brunei IV District schools ====
- SR Bebuloh
- SR Junjongan
- SR Kasat
- SR Lumapas
- SR Masin
- SR Nakhoda Abdul Rashid Menunggol
- SR Panchor Murai
- SR PB Limau Manis
- SR Pengkalan Batu
- SR Pudak (closed 2004)
- SR Pulau Baru-Baru (closed)
- SR Putat

==== Tutong I District schools ====
- SR Bakiau
- SR Batang Mitus
- SR Binturan (MOD)
- SR Birau
- SR Bukit Panggal
- SR Keriam
- SR kg Menengah
- SR Kiudang
- SR Lamunin
- SR Muda Hashim
- SR OKAWSD Kupang
- SR PDN Pg Jaya
- SR Penanjong
- SR Pg Muda Mahkota
- SR Sinaut
- SR Tutong Kem (MOD)

==== Tutong II District schools ====
- SR AR Tanjong Maya
- SR Belabau (Closed)
- SR Benutan
- SR Bukit Udal
- SR Danau
- SR DPS Ukong
- SR kg Bukit
- SR Layong (Closed)
- SR Long Mayan (Closed)
- SR Lubok Pulau
- SR Panchong
- SR Penapar
- SR PKN Bukit Beruang
- SR RPN Bukit Beruang
- SR Rambai
- SR Sg Damit Pemadang (Closed)
- SR Supon (Closed)
- SR Tumpuan Telisai

==== Belait District schools ====
- SR Ahmad Tajuddin
- SR DMSD Sukang
- SR Kuala Belait
- SR Labi
- SR Lumut
- SR Melilas
- SR Merangking
- SR Muhammad Alam
- SR OKPB Bukit Sawat (Closed)
- SR Panaga
- SR PSJ Pg Abd Momin
- SR PSN Pg Mohd Yusof
- SR Rampayoh (Closed)
- SR Sungai Liang
- SR Sungai Tali
- SR Sungai Teraban
- SR PSB SOAS

==== Temburong District schools ====
- SR Amo
- SR Bokok
- SR Kenua (closed)
- SR Labu Estate
- SR Negalang
- SR Puni
- SR Selangan
- SR Selapon
- SR Semabat
- SR Senukoh (closed)
- SR Sultan Hashim
- SR Sultan Hassan
- SR Piasau piasau (closed 2015)
- SR Rataie

==== Religious schools ====
- Sek Ugama Beribi Gadong
- Sek Arab Sungai Akar BSB
- Sek Persediaan Arab B.S.B.
- Sek Persediaan Arab Temburong
- Sek Al-Falaah Sungai Akar
- Sek Ugama Daerah Belait
- Sek Ugama Daerah Temburong
- Sek Ugama Daerah Tutong
- Sek Ugama Kawasan Brunei I
- Sek Ugama Kawasan Brunei II
- Sek Ugama Kawasan Brunei III
- Sek Ugama Kawasan Brunei IV
- Sek Ugama Lambak Jln Bedil
- Sek Ugama Madang
- Sek Ugama Menglait
- Sek Ugama Pengiran Anak Puteri Majeedah, Kilanas
- Sek Ugama Pengiran Anak Puteri Masna
- Sek Ugama Pengiran Anak Puteri Mutawakillah Hayatul Bolkiah Serusop
- Sek Ugama Rimba 1
- Sek Ugama Tungku
- Sek Ugama Pengiran Anak Puteri 'Azemah Ni'matul Bolkiah

=== Private schools ===
- Jigsaw Primary School
- Learning Tree School
- Nusa Laila Puteri School
- Sekolah Cemerlang Abejess (SECA school)
- Sekolah Persekutuan Guru Guru Melayu Brunei, P.G.G.M.B, Sg Akar
- Seri Mulia Sarjana International School
- Seri Mulia Sarjana School
- Sinaran Mas School
- Stella's School
- DES School (Brunei Private School)
- Yayasan Sultan Haji Hassanal Bolkiah Primary School
- Bright Jigsaw International School
- Sekolah Tadika Jaya Datin Hajah Malai Ragayah.

==== Brunei I District schools ====
- Miftah An-Nur Islamic International School
- Iqra Primary School

==== Tutong District schools ====
- Chung Hwa – Kiudang
- Nusa Jaya – Tutong
- Sekolah Pertama – Tutong
- SR Mustadim – Tutong

==== Belait District schools ====
- ABC School – Belait
- Calvert
- Chung Ching Middle School – Seria
- Chung Hua Middle School – Kuala Belait
- Chung Hwa – Labi
- Chung Lian – Sg Liang
- Panaga
- St Angela's Convent – Seria
- St James's – Kuala Belait
- St John's – Kuala Belait
- St. Margaret's School – Seria
- St Michael's – Seria (closed)
- Tadika Alif
- Tunas Jaya PGGMB – Belait

==== Temburong District schools ====
- Pai Yuek Bangar
- Suria Jaya Kindergarten School

== Sixth form schools ==
- Hassanal Bolkiah Boys' Arabic Secondary School
- Duli Pengiran Muda Al-Muhtadee Billah College MAKTAB DULI PENGIRANG MUDA AL-MUHTADEE BILLAH
- Belait Sixth Form Centre PUSAT TINGKATAN ENAM BELAIT
- Meragang Sixth Form Centre PUSAT TINGKATAN ENAM MERAGANG
- Sengkurong Sixth Form Centre PUSAT TINGKATAN ENAM SENKURONG
- Tutong Sixth Form Centre PUSAT TINGKATAN ENAM TUTONG

== Post-secondary and tertiary institutions ==
- Cosmopolitan College of Commerce and Technology
- Institute of Brunei Technical Education
- Brunei Technological University (Universiti Teknologi Brunei; formerly Institut Teknologi Brunei)
- Sultan Sharif Ali Islamic University (Universiti Islam Sultan Sharif Ali)
- University of Brunei Darussalam (Universiti Brunei Darussalam)
- Seri Begawan Religious Teachers University College (Kolej Universiti Perguruan Ugama Seri Begawan)

== See also ==
- Education in Asia
- Lists of schools
