= IBTE Business Campus =

Campus in Gadong 'B'

- IBTE Kampus Bisnes
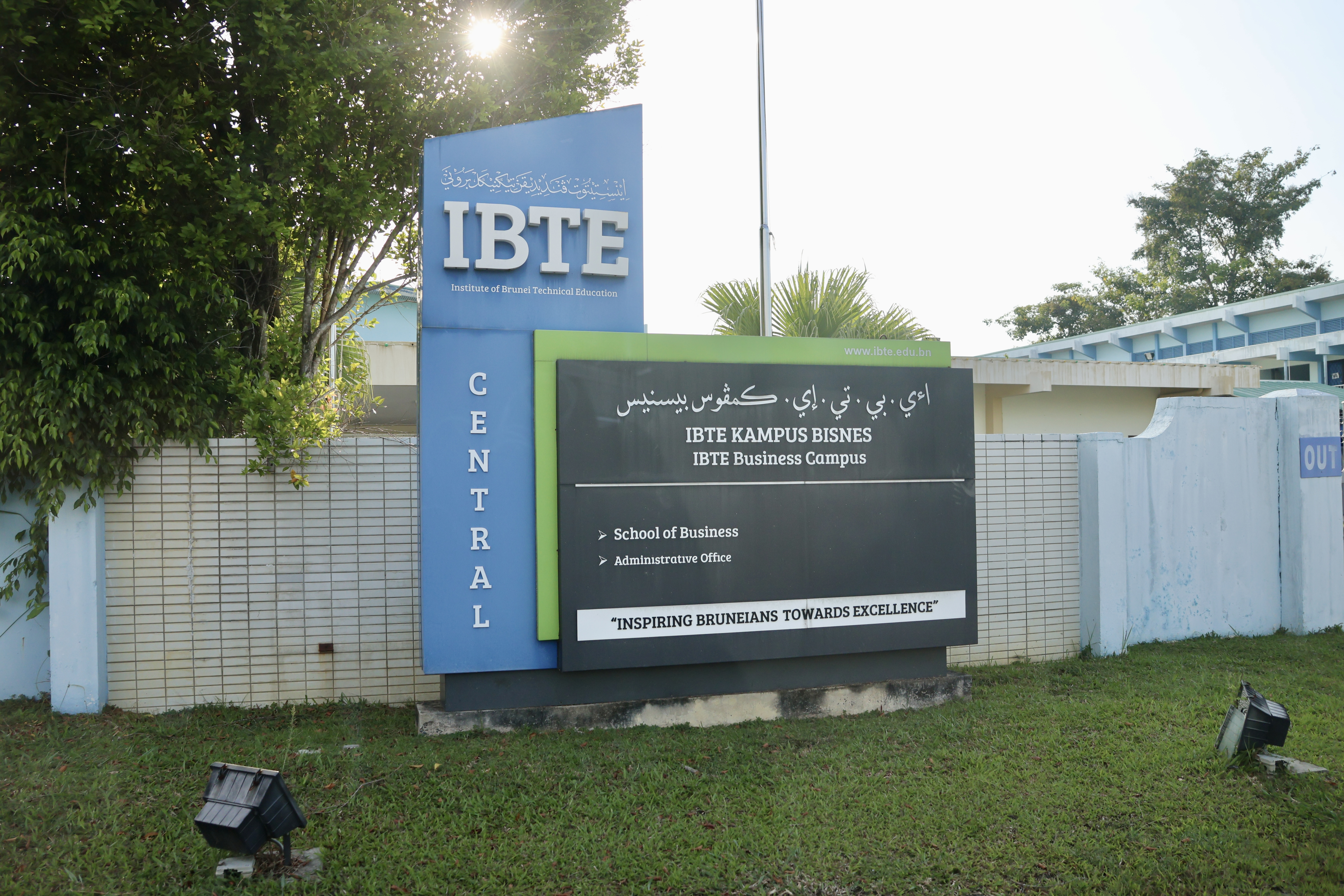
- Former names: Business School (Sekolah Perdagangan)
- Type: Public
- Established: February 1, 2005; 21 years ago
- Parent institution: Institute of Brunei Technical Education
- Location: Gadong 'B', Brunei-Muara, Brunei; 4.9050899°N 114.9108932°E
- Campus: Urban
- Website: ibte.edu.bn

IBTE Business Campus (Malay: IBTE Kampus Bisnes), formerly known as Business School (Malay: Sekolah Perdagangan, Abbrev: SP), is a campus of the Institute of Brunei Technical Education (IBTE), a post-secondary vocational institution in Brunei. It is located in Gadong 'B', Brunei-Muara District. The institution offers vocational courses in the fields of business.

== History ==
IBTE Business Campus became operational on 1 February 2005 with the name Sekolah Perdagangan (Business School) as an independent government technical college, overseen by the then Department of Technical Education under the Ministry of Education. In 2014, it was subsumed under, and made a campus of, IBTE, the umbrella institution which effectively replaced the department. The campus acquired its present name two years later.

== Academics ==
The Business Campus houses one of IBTE's schools, which is the School of Business. The schools offer programmes in the fields of business, leading up to Diploma, Higher National Technical Education Certificate (HNTec) and National Technical Education Certificate (NTec).
