= St. Margaret's School, Brunei =

Private school in Seria, Brunei

St. Margaret's School
- Sekolah St. Margaret

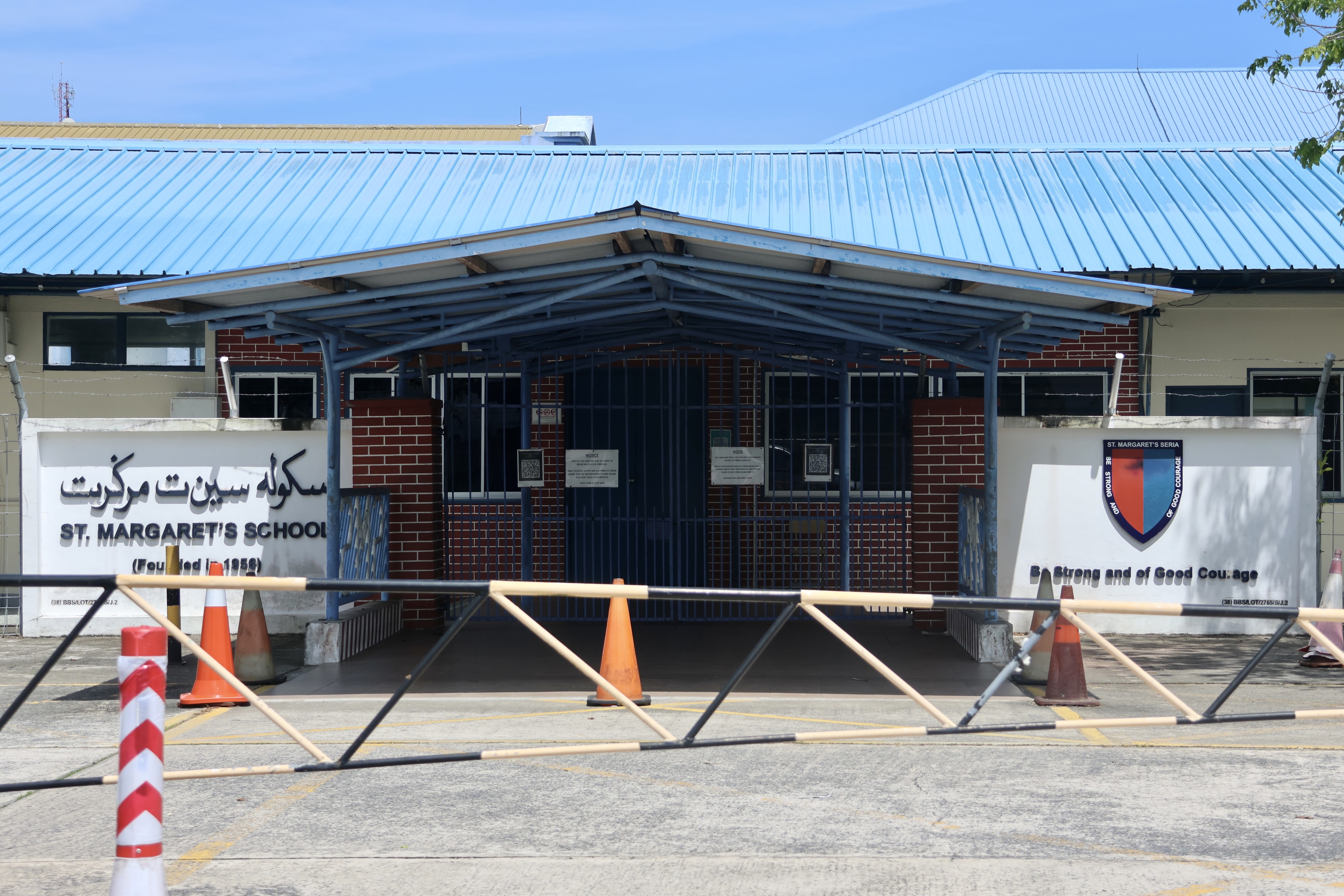

Location
- Jalan Bolkiah; Pekan Seria, Belait District; Brunei
- Coordinates: 4.6097600°N 114.3351496°E

Information
- Type: Private
- Motto: Be Strong and of Good Courage
- Established: 1955
- Status: Operational
- Principal: Liew Yong Kim
- Gender: Coeducational
- Colours: Red, White, Blue
- Nickname: SMS
- Affiliations: CIE
- Website: stmargaretseria.org

St. Margaret's School (Malay: Sekolah St. Margaret, Abbrev: SMS) is a private school in Seria, Brunei Darussalam.

== History ==
The school was founded by Mr Amir a resident priest at St. Margaret's Church, in 1955. The first school was an old wooden building which was a vehicle repair shop opposite St. Margaret's Church. The school started with three classes and had 60 children. It was inaugurated by R.E. Hales, the Managing Director of British Malayan Petroleum Company on 8 April 1956. The school moved to its present site, which was given by the government, in 1959.

The school was established by the efforts of founder Principal Rev L R Melling and the parishioners of St Margaret’s Church in Seria at Lorong Tiga to cater for those who wanted English as the medium of instruction. It was officially opened by R E Hales, managing director of British Malayan Petroleum Company on 8 April 1956.

St. Margaret's School, circa 1956

In January 1960, the school opened a secondary section with Form 1.

In February 1960, John Heath took over as the principal.

The ARCON building was inaugurated by the Managing Director of Brunei Shell Petroleum, PM Linton, on 7 May 1961.

The first batch of candidates from St Margaret's entered the Brunei Certificate of Education in November 1962 (which was later changed to PMB) and the Cambridge School Certificate of Examination in 1964.

A new classroom block was inaugurated by the Bishop of Borneo on 26 February 1967, and the principal's quarters were completed in October 1967.

Mr Curie (Australia) took over for a short while as acting principal. John Heath served the school as principal until 1970.

A new school block was opened in December 2012.

== Principals ==
John Heath, Olwyn Parker, Sheila Vicars and David Vicars

| Principal | Years served |
|---|---|
| Rev L. R. Melling | 1956–1958 |
| John Heath | 1960–1970 |
| Rev. J. G. R. Osborne | 1971–1974 |
| Rev. A. J. Tudball | May–December 1975 |
| Abraham Thomas | 1978–1996 |
| Siew Kuan Keasberry | 1997–2007 |
| Hjh Kertini Binti OKPSD Abang Hj Abu Hanifah | 2007–2009 |
| Mohan Varghese | 2009–2011 |
| Koh Hong Puah | 2011–2017 |
| Liew Yong Kim | 2017–present |

== See also ==
- Education in Asia
- List of schools in Brunei
