= IBTE Jefri Bolkiah Campus =

- IBTE Kampus Jefri Bolkiah
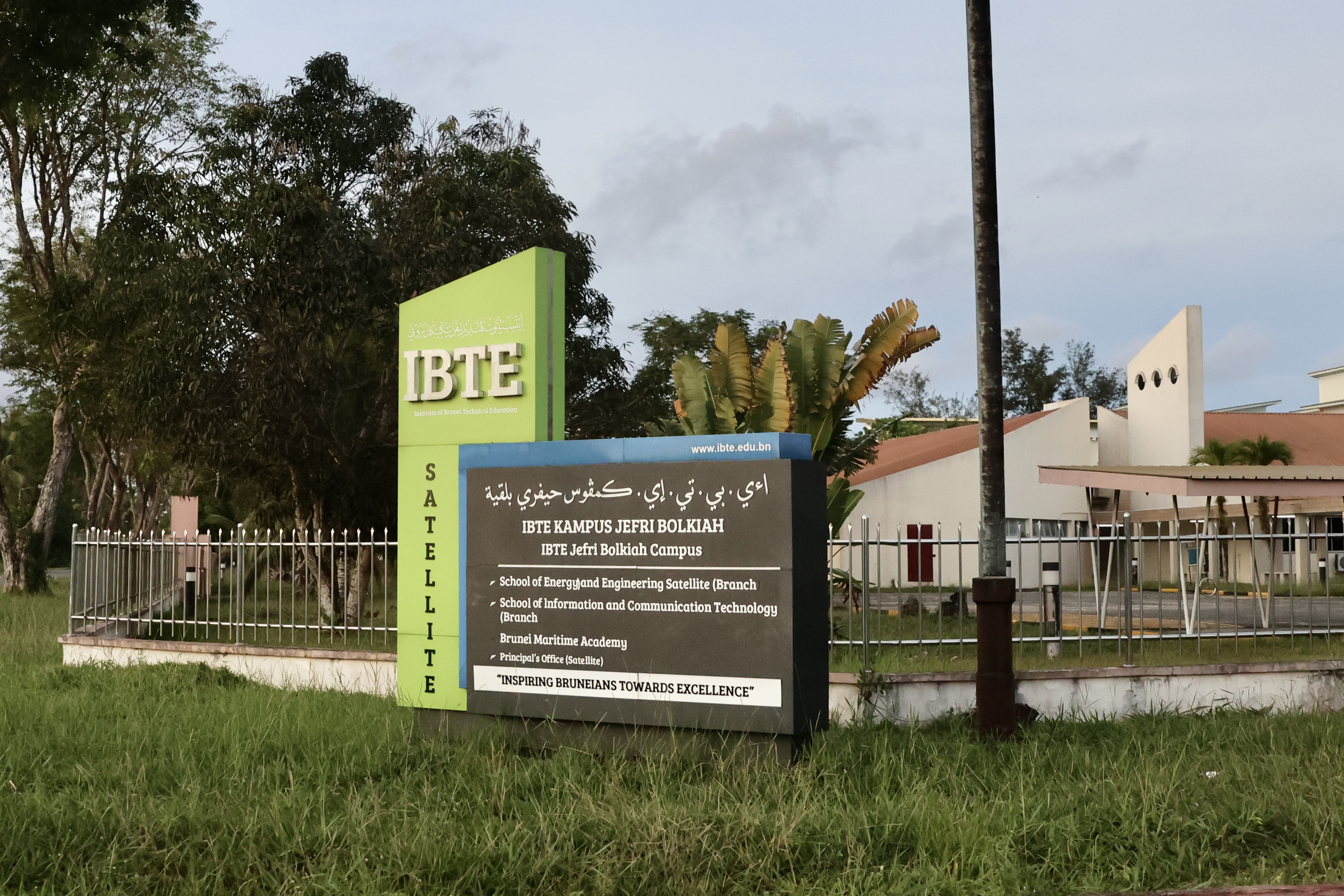
- Former names: Jefri Bolkiah College of Engineering (Maktab Kejuruteraan Jefri Bolkiah)
- Type: Public
- Established: 1970; 56 years ago
- Parent institution: Institute of Brunei Technical Education
- Location: Kuala Belait, Belait, Brunei; 4°34′44.7″N 114°12′19.3″E
- Campus: Urban
- Website: ibte.edu.bn

IBTE Jefri Bolkiah Campus, formerly known as Jefri Bolkiah College of Engineering (Malay: Maktab Kejuruteraan Jefri Bolkiah, abbreviated as MKJB), is a campus of the Institute of Brunei Technical Education (IBTE), a post-secondary vocational institution in Brunei. It is located in Kuala Belait, the main town of Belait District. The institution offers vocational courses in the fields of engineering and information and communications technology.

== History ==
IBTE Jefri Bolkiah Campus was established in 1970 with the name Maktab Kejuruteraan Jefri Bolkiah (Jefri Bolkiah College of Engineering) as an independent government technical college, nevertheless overseen by the then Department of Technical Education under the Ministry of Education. In 2014, it was subsumed under, and made a campus of, IBTE, the umbrella institution which effectively replaced the department. The campus acquired its present name two years later.

== Academics ==
The Jefri Bolkiah Campus houses three of IBTE's schools, namely the Brunei Maritime Academy, School of Energy and Engineering, and School of Information and Communication Technology. The schools offer programmes in the fields of engineering and information and communications technology, leading up to Diploma, Higher National Technical Education Certificate (HNTec) and National Technical Education Certificate (NTec).
