= IBTE Sultan Saiful Rijal Campus =

Coordinates: 4°56′48.6″N 114°57′10.4″E

- IBTE Kampus Sultan Saiful Rijal
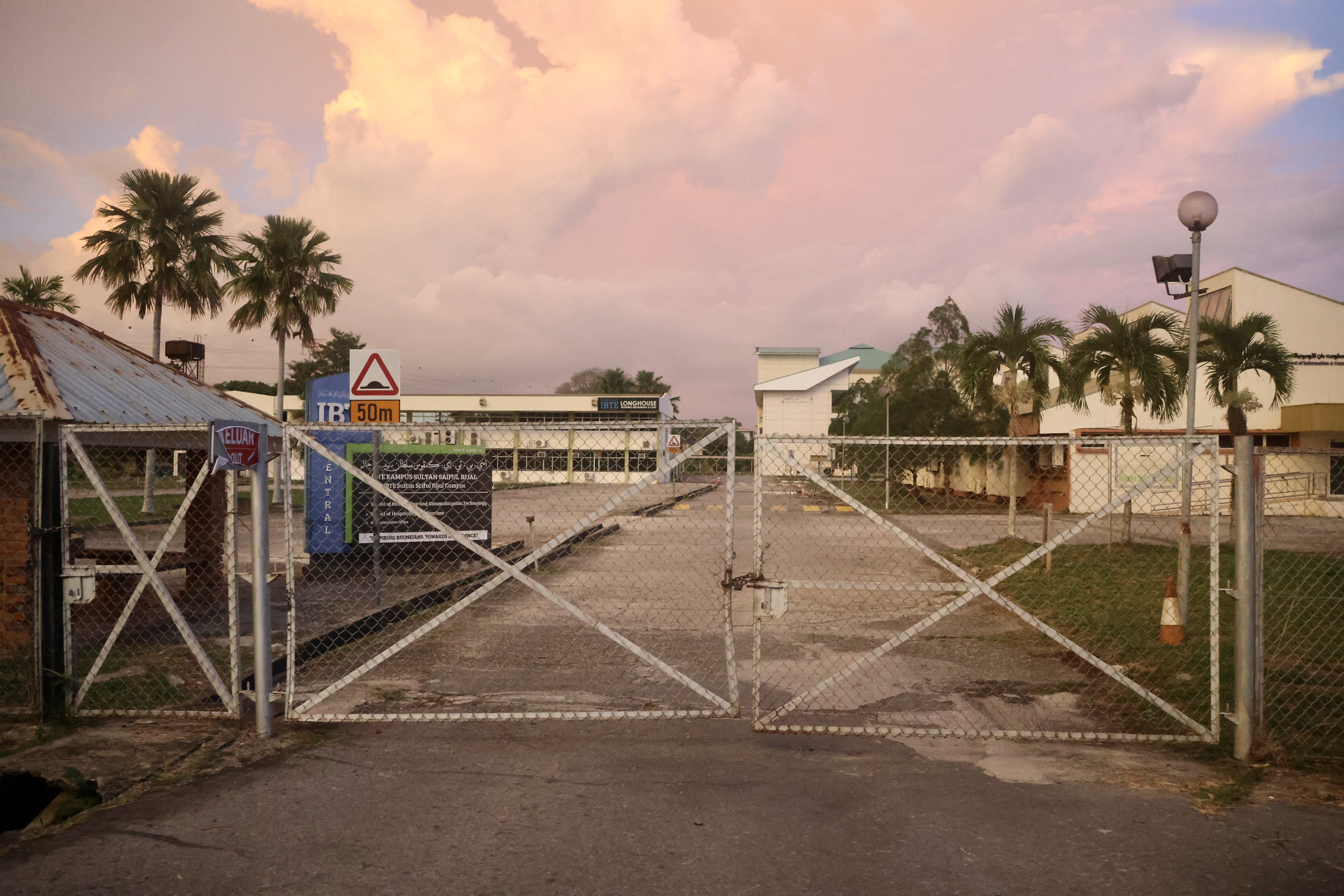
- Former names: Maktab Teknik Sultan Saiful Rijal (Sultan Saiful Rijal Technical College)
- Type: post-secondary, technical
- Established: 1970
- Parent institution: Institute of Brunei Technical Education
- Location: Bandar Seri Begawan, Brunei
- Website: ibte.edu.bn

IBTE Sultan Saiful Rijal Campus, formerly known as Sultan Saiful Rijal Technical College (Malay: Maktab Teknik Sultan Saiful Rijal; Malay, abbreviated: MTSSR), is one of the technical institute in Bandar Seri Begawan, Brunei. Since 2014, it has been subsumed and fully administered under the Institute of Brunei Technical Education.

== Schools and programmes offered ==
Sultan Saiful Rijal Campus is home to three Schools, offering Higher National Technical Certificate (HNTec) and National Technical Certificate (NTec) programmes are:

- School of Hospitality and Tourism
  - HNTec in Hospitality Operations
  - HNTec in Travel and Tourism
  - NTec in Culinary Operations
  - NTec Apprenticeship in Professional Cookery And Services
- School of Information and Communication Technology, Branch
  - HNTec in Information Technology
  - HNTec in Information and Library Studies
  - NTec in Information Technology
- School of Aviation (New building off Serusop roundabout)
  - HNTec in Aircraft Maintenance Engineering (Avionics)
  - HNTec in Aircraft Maintenance Engineering (Airframe and Engine)
  - HNTec in Electronic Engineering
  - HNTec in Electronics and Media Technology
  - HNTec in Telecommunication Systems
