= IBTE Agro-Technology Campus =

Coordinates: 4°45′52.8″N 114°48′37.8″E

- IBTE Kampus Agro-Teknologi
- Former names: Wasan Vocational School (Malay: Sekolah Vokasional Wasan)
- Type: vocational
- Established: 2006
- Parent institution: Institute of Brunei Technical Education
- Location: Wasan, Brunei-Muara, Brunei
- Website: http://ibte.edu.bn

IBTE Agro-Technology Campus, formerly known as Wasan Vocational School (Malay: Sekolah Vokasional Wasan) is a vocational school in Brunei and one of the campuses under the Institute of Brunei Technical Education (IBTE). It is located in Wasan, a rural settlement in Brunei-Muara District. The school provides training courses for knowledge and skills in agriculture and agro-technology.

== History ==
IBTE Agro-Technology Campus was established in 2006 as Sekolah Vokasional Wasan. In 2014, Sekolah Vokasional Wasan was subsumed, with several other technical and vocational schools, under a new umbrella institution. The merger of the schools has been part of the restructuring of technical and vocational education system in the country. In 2016, Sekolah Vokasional Wasan was renamed to its current name to reflect the focus of the programmes offered in the school, particularly with the introduction of agro-technology course.

The school has had its own campus since its establishment. The campus officially began its construction on 15 October 2003 with the foundation-laying ceremony by the then Minister of Education, Awang Abdul Aziz Bin Awang Omar. It was completed by 2006 with the key-handing ceremony in May of that year.

== Academics ==
IBTE Agro-Technology Campus offers Higher National Technical Certificate (HNTec) and National Technical Certificate (NTec) programmes in subjects of agrotechnology, aquaculture technology, food science and technology, and applied sciences. All of the programmes are under the School of Agro-Technology and Applied Sciences, the only academic department of the school. The duration of programmes lasts either one or two years.
