= IBTE Mechanical Campus =

- IBTE Kampus Mekanikal
- Former names: Mechanical Training Centre (Malay: Pusat Latihan Mekanik)
- Type: vocational
- Established: 1986
- Parent institution: Institute of Brunei Technical Education
- Location: Tungku, Brunei-Muara, Brunei; 4°56′30″N 114°52′49″E

IBTE Mechanical Campus, formerly known as Mechanical Training Centre (Malay: Pusat Latihan Mekanik, abbreviated as PLM) is a government vocational school in Brunei and one of the campuses under the Institute of Brunei Technical Education (IBTE). It is located in Tungku, a settlement in Brunei-Muara District. The school is a post-secondary institution which provides training specifically for the purpose of being a vehicle mechanic.

== History ==
The institution was established on 24 February 1986 with the name Pusat Latihan Mekanik (Mechanical Training Centre), an independent vocational school, nevertheless overseen by the then Department of Technical Education under the Ministry of Education. In 2014, the school was subsumed under the department and the latter was revamped to become an umbrella institute. The school eventually adopted its current name two years later.
