= Pusat Tingkatan Enam Berakas =

Berakas Sixth Form Centre
- Pusat Tingkatan Enam Berakas

Location
- Simpang 637-84; Lambak Kiri, Berakas 'A', Brunei-Muara District, BB1114; Brunei
- Coordinates: 4.9860870°N 114.9424011°E

Information
- Type: Government
- Motto: Committed, Progressive, Competitive.
- Established: November 2005
- Status: Closed
- Closed: 14 March 2009
- Authority: Ministry of Education
- Principal: Lee Yen Tshin (2005-08); Chong Li Chen (2008-09)
- Grades: 12-13
- Gender: Coeducational
- Enrollment: 970(2011 est.)
- Nickname: PTEB, PTE Berakas
- Affiliation: CIE

Berakas Sixth Form Centre (Malay: Pusat Tingkatan Enam Berakas, Abbrev: PTEB), was a government-run sixth form centre in Brunei Darussalam, located in Lambak Kiri. PTEB, opened in November 2005. Students studied towards Cambridge 'A' and 'AS' level qualifications.

Pusat Tingkatan Enam Berakas ceased operations on 14 March 2009. Staff and students were relocated to a new campus in Kampong Meragang. The new campus is called Pusat Tingkatan Enam Meragang. The Lambak Kiri campus is now home to a new secondary school and has been named Sekolah Menengah Lambak Kiri (Lambak Kiri Secondary School).

The PTE Berakas Alumni remains active. It has been incorporated into the PTE Meragang Alumni.

== The Centre ==
=== Overview ===
Pusat Tingkatan Enam Berakas was established to provide sixth form education in Negara Brunei Darussalam. The centre opened its doors on 26 November 2005, initially with just 391 students. PTE Berakas accommodated just over 1000 students in 2007, comprising both upper and lower sixth forms. The student population numbered over 1100 when it relocated to Kampong Meragang.

Pusat Tingkatan Enam Berakas covered a land area of 6 hectares; the construction of which cost more than 12 million Brunei Dollars. The average number of teaching staff at Pusat Tingkatan Enam Berakas hovered around 100; consisting of a mix of Bruneians and expatriates. There were 19 support staff members assigned to different duties around the centre.

The centre had a variety of teaching and learning facilities including 42 classrooms, 14 science labs, 3 computer labs, 2 art studios, 1 language lab and 1 lecture room. In addition to the labs and classrooms designed for teaching, the centre also had rooms intended for administration purposes. An illustration of these Administration rooms are those such as the conference room, offices for the principal, the deputy principals and the senior masters and mistresses, plus rooms intended for careers, student welfare and counselling sections.

This centre also provided rooms for students' use such as a library and a student council room. Other facilities included prayer rooms, canteen, a large multi-purpose hall, a futsal court and a court for basketball, netball and volleyball games.

== Subjects offered ==
The subjects offered at lower sixth and upper sixth mainly of Cambridge 'A' Level subjects. The subjects are as follow:

- Bahasa Melayu
- Syariah
- Usuluddin
- English Language 'O' Level
- English Language 'AS' Level
- General Paper
- English Literature
- Mathematics
- Physics
- Chemistry
- Biology
- History
- Geography
- Accounting
- Economics
- Business Studies
- Art & Design
- Psychology
- Sociology
- Travel and Tourism
- Applied Information and Communication Technology

== Physical Location ==
Simpang 637-84
Skim Tanah Kurnia Rakyat Jati (STKRJ) Lambak Kiri
BB1114, Berakas
Negara Brunei Darussalam

The school is currently located at (Known as Pusat Tingkatan Enam Meragang aka PTEM) Tutong - Muara Highway Kampong Meragang Mukim Serasa BT2728 Brunei Darussalam
