= IBTE Nakhoda Ragam Campus =

Coordinates: 4°59′44.7″N 114°58′39.3″E

- IBTE Kampus Nakhoda Ragam
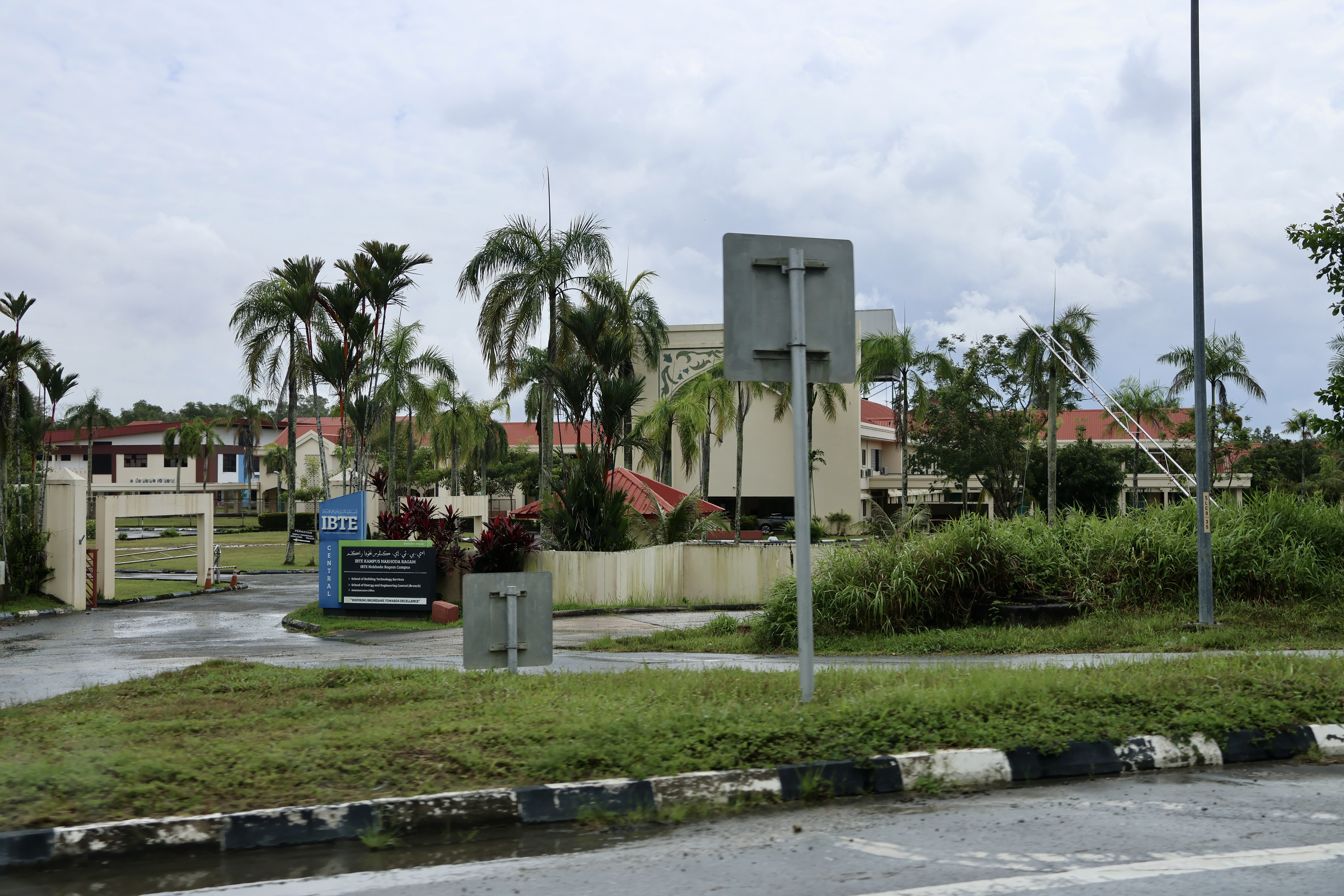
- The campus in 2024
- Former names: Sekolah Vokasional Nakhoda Ragam (Nakhoda Ragam Vocational School)
- Type: post-secondary, vocational
- Established: 1970
- Parent institution: Institute of Brunei Technical Education
- Location: Kampong Salambigar, Brunei-Muara, Brunei
- Website: ibte.edu.bn

IBTE Nakhoda Ragam Campus, formerly known as Nakhoda Ragam Vocational School (Malay: Sekolah Vokasional Nakhoda Ragam; Malay, abbreviated: SVNR), is one of the technical institute in Bandar Seri Begawan, Brunei. Since 2014, it has been subsumed and fully administered under the Institute of Brunei Technical Education.

== History ==
Construction on Lambak Kanan Vocational School started in August 1990 and was finished in November of the same year. Situated approximately 10 kilometres (6.2 mi) from Bandar Seri Begawan in then-Lambak Kanan, it rose to become the seventh vocational and technical center in the nation. The school provides eight two-and-a-half-year courses in a variety of vocations, such as electronics, plumbing, carpentry, and bricklaying, with the aim of giving residents specialized skills to satisfy the country's labor need.

== Schools and programmes offered ==
Nakhoda Ragam Campus is home to two Schools, offering Higher National Technical Certificate (HNTec) and National Technical Certificate (NTec) programmes are:

- School of Energy and Engineering Central (Branch):
  - HNTec in Electrical Engineering
  - NTec in Electrical Technology
- School of Building Technology Services:
  - HNTec in Construction & Draughting (Dual TVET)
  - HNTec in Geomatics
  - HNTec in Real Estate Management & Agency
  - NTec in Building Craft
