= Meragang Sixth Form Centre =

Coordinates: 5°02′08.4″N 115°02′28.6″E

Pusat Tingkatan Enam Meragang
- Meragang Sixth Form Centre

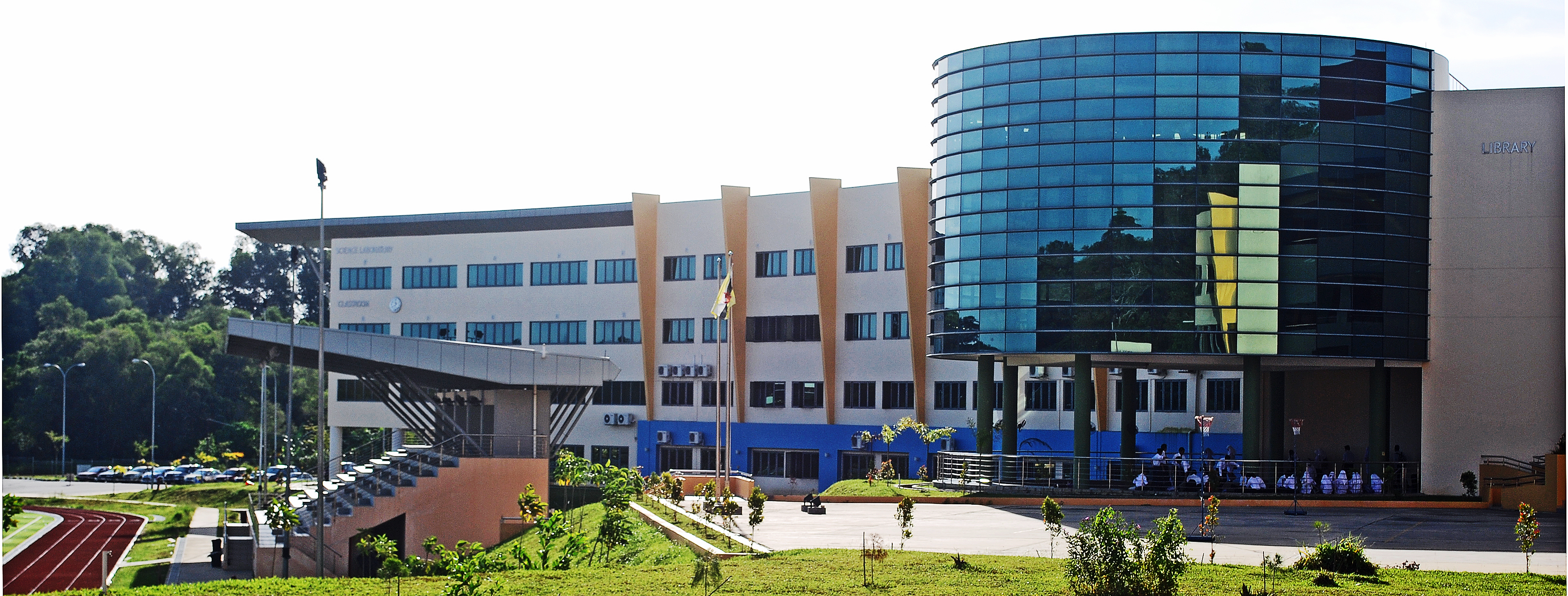
- PTEM in 2012

Location
- Muara - Tutong Highway; Kampong Meragang, Mukim Serasa, BT2728; Brunei

Information
- Type: Sixth Form College
- Motto: Beriltizam, Berdaya Maju, Berdaya Saing (Committed, Progressive, Competitive)
- Established: 2009
- Authority: Ministry of Education
- Principal: Cikgu Moss bin Mat Juni
- Deputy Principal: Cikgu Nurul Amalina binti Haji Ali
- Staff: 110 local and foreign
- Gender: Mixed
- Age: 16 to 19
- Enrollment: 850
- Language: English / Malay / Hebrew / Chinese / Tamil
- Houses: Indera Pahlawan; Indera Putra; Indera Mahkota; Indera Wijaya
- Colours: Uniforms; Girls; Boys
- Former name: Pusat Tingkatan Enam Berakas
- Website: www.ptem.net

Meragang Sixth Form Centre (Malay: Pusat Tingkatan Enam Meragang, abbrev: PTEM) is a sixth form college located in Kampong Meragang, Brunei Darussalam. Known locally by its acronym, PTEM offers Cambridge International Examinations AS-level examinations at the end of students' first year, or the following May/June, and A-level examinations in the October/November of the second.

Opened in 2009, PTEM became the new campus for the former Pusat Tingkatan Enam Berakas, previously located in Lambak Kiri. PTEM is a government institution administered by the Brunei Ministry of Education. Kampong Meragang is located along the Tutong-Muara Highway approximately 24 km from the capital Bandar Seri Begawan.

PTEM currently serves 850 students with a teaching faculty of 110 local and international staff.

== Notable alumni ==
- Lee Ying Shi, national wushu athlete

== See also ==
- List of schools in Brunei
