= Sengkurong Sixth Form Centre =

- Pusat Tingkatan Enam Sengkurong

Location
- Jalan Mulaut - Limau Manis; Mulaut, Sengkurong, Brunei-Muara District, BG2121; Brunei; 4°51′56.9″N 114°50′39.8″E

Information
- Type: Government
- Opened: 2014
- Status: Operational
- Authority: Ministry of Education
- Grades: 12-13
- Gender: Coeducational
- Nickname: PTES; PTE Sengkurong
- Affiliation: CIE

Sengkurong Sixth Form Centre (Malay: Pusat Tingkatan Enam Sengkurong, Abbrev: PTES) is a sixth form centre in Mulaut, Brunei-Muara District, Brunei.

== Background ==
Sengkurong Sixth Form Centre is located in Mulaut, a settlement in Brunei-Muara District outside Bandar Seri Begawan. The school takes its name from the name of the mukim or subdistrict where it lies.

The establishment of Sengkurong Sixth Form Centre was intended to address overcapacity at the former Katok Sixth Form Centre. The construction of the new campus began in September 2011 and estimated to have cost around B$28 million. The school building complex was design by its principal architect, Ar. Masri Hj. Mohd Taha, ARB, RIBA, RAIA, BAPEQS, of Arkitek OPFIS, a British trained Bruneian Chartered Architect.

The school opened its doors in early 2014 with the transfer of students, teachers and staff from Katok, as well as the admission of the new intake for that year. Since then, the school mainly caters for leavers from secondary schools in Mukim Sengkurong, Mukim Gadong A and B, Mukim Kilanas and Mukim Lumapas, as well as a few nearby villages in Tutong.

Subsequently, the former campus is turned into a secondary school that would cater the residents of Katok and its vicinity.

== Programme ==
Similar to other sixth form centres elsewhere in the country, Sengkurong Sixth Form Centre offers two-year A-level programme for secondary school leavers interested in pursuing academic post-secondary education.

Studies begin in late February or early March, after the release of O Level results early each year. In October and November of the following year, students sit for the A-Level examinations.

== Facilities ==
The school buildings sit on a 16.58 acres of land and its students capacity can reach up to 1,500. Facilities include:

- Classrooms;
- Science laboratories;
- Special rooms for Art, Design and Technology, and Food Studies;
- Multipurpose hall;
- Multimedia hall;
- Students centre;
- Library; and
- Surau or prayer hall.
