= Midstory =

US nonprofit organization

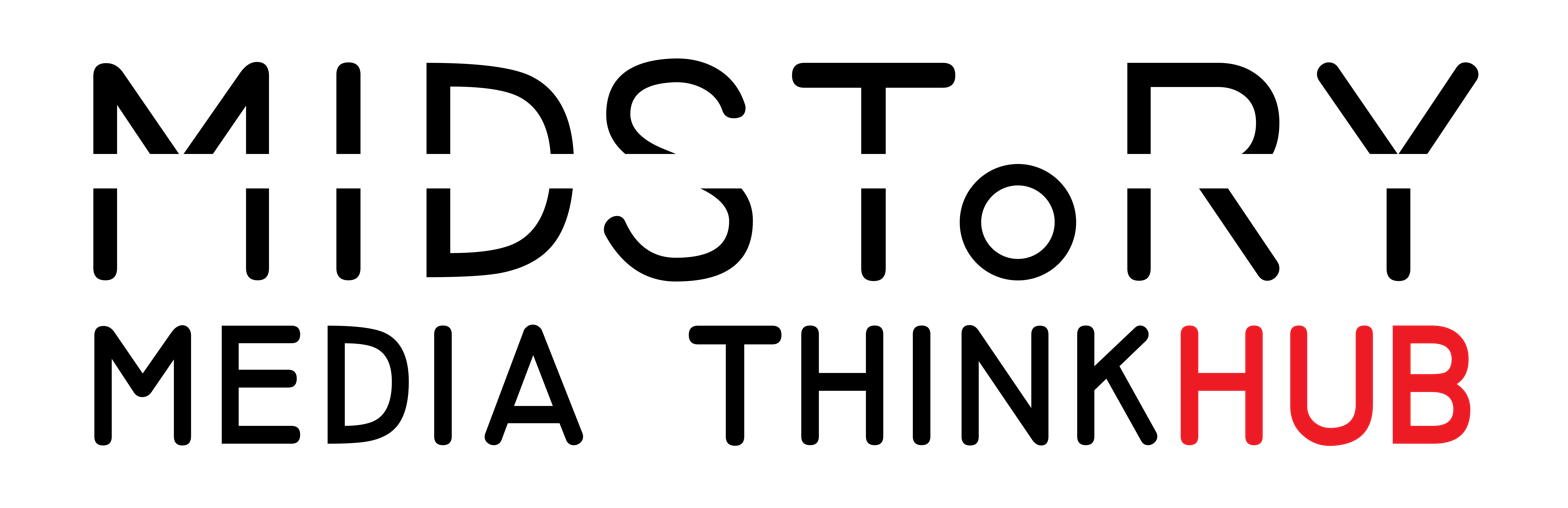
- Founded: 2018; 8 years ago
- Founders: Samuel Chang; Logan Sander; Ruth Chang; Alex Lim
- Type: Think Tank
- Legal status: Non-profit organization
- Location: Toledo, Ohio, United States
- Website: www.midstory.org

Midstory is a 501(c)(3) nonprofit organization and media think tank in Toledo, Ohio.

== Background and history ==
Midstory was founded in Toledo, Ohio, in 2018 by Samuel Chang, Logan Sander, Ruth Chang, and Alex Lim. The four founders left their hometowns to attend Ivy League colleges before returning to the Midwest to start Midstory with the goal of attracting young people to the Midwest. The name "Midstory" comes from the ecological term meaning the middle layer in a canopy of trees.

== Programs ==
Midstory outreaches students to give them opportunities to explore the Midwest while researching and developing their own multimedia stories. Midstory began its summer college and high school programs in 2019. Midstory's virtual college programs in 2020 and 2021 provided students from across the country the opportunity to experience and build connections to Toledo and other Midwestern cities. Midstory's projects focus on city infrastructure, demography, local journalism, voting, and water. Among these projects, the Water Project and the Demography Project focus on local issues of algal blooms in Lake Erie and Toledo's declining population, respectively.

== Partnerships/collaborations ==
Midstory co-founders have appeared as guests of WGTE Public Media's radio show, Rough Draft Diaries with Haley Taylor on two occasions. Midstory also contributed a segment on the Great Black Swamp in a mini-documentary with WGTE aired in Oct. 2019 on Detroit Public Television as part of the Great Lakes Now series.

Midstory was a partner with the Toledo Design Collective to revitalize the Garfield neighborhood in East Toledo through the Garfield Community Plan.

Midstory has also set-up public interactive exhibitions including "Asian in Ohio" and "Colors of Climate Change" at the Toledo-Lucas County Public Library Main Library in downtown Toledo.

== Recognition ==
2020: Midstory received the 2020 Nonprofit Innovation Award from the Center for Nonprofit Resources and the Greater Toledo Community Foundation.

2023: Midstory article, Hidden Gems, places as finalist in the 2023 ArcGIS StoryMaps Competition.

2024: Midstory article, A rural Illinois community fights back against factory farms, places as finalist in the 2024 ArcGIS StoryMaps Competition.

2025: Midstory received the inaugural David Descutner and DeLysa Burnier Award for Excellence in the Humanities from Ohio Humanities.
