= Madhav Bhandari =

Indian politician

Spokesperson at Bharatiya Janata Party, Maharashtra
- Incumbent
- Assumed office 2010

Vice President, Sindhudurg Zilla Parishad
- In office 1997–2001

Member, Konkan Housing and Area Development Board
- In office 1996–1998

Personal details
- Born: 21 October 1954 (age 71) Devgad taluka, Maharashtra, India
- Party: Bharatiya Janata Party
- Children: Chinmay
- Occupation: Politician
- Website: www.mahabjp.org

Madhav Bhandari (born 21 October 1954) is an Indian politician of Bharatiya Janata Party Maharashtra. He worked Full-timer for BJP in 1980–1990. Then promoted as Spokesperson & Media Chief of BJP in 1982–1985.

He is currently working as Chief Spokesperson of Bharatiya Janata Party, Maharashtra State unit.

== Early life ==
Since childhood he joined RSS later he worked for ABVP in student life. He entered in Print Media from the days of Emergency in 1975. He was Additional Editor In Chief of Vivek (Mumbai).

== Career ==
He represents the state of Maharashtra in the committee of BJP, chaired by President Raosaheb Dadarao Danve. He has served as the spokesperson of BJP from 2010 to the current date.

=== Positions held ===
==== Within BJP ====
- Full-timer, BJP (1980–1990)
- Spokesperson & Media Chief, BJP (1982–1985)
- Organising Secretary, Kokan Division BJP (1980–1982 & 1985–1990)
- President, Sindhudurg district, BJP (2003–2005)
- Currently Chief Spokesperson, Maharashtra BJP

==== Legislative ====
- Member, Konkan Housing and Area Development Board (1996–1998)
- Vice President, Sindhudurg Zilla Parishad (1997–2001)
- President, Sindhudurg Zilla Parishad (2001) Additional Charge
