= National Technical Education Certificate =

The National Technical Education Certificate, abbreviated as NTec, is a post-secondary vocational qualification in Brunei. It is a Level 3 qualification in the country's current national qualifications framework and awarded by the Brunei Darussalam Technical and Vocational Education Council (BDTVEC), a government body under the Ministry of Education. It is equivalent to the Skill Certificate 3; the latter had been phased out in government institutions. NTec programmes are offered in the Institute of Brunei Technical Education and generally last one or two years. Entry to the qualification requires completion of the secondary education although it is not necessary to obtain any credits in the O Level examination. NTec qualification allows entry to the Higher National Technical Education Certificate (HNTec) or other Level 4-equivalent qualification.
