= Higher National Technical Education Certificate =

The Higher National Technical Education Certificate, abbreviated as HNTec, is a post-secondary vocational qualification in Brunei. It is a Level 4 qualification in the country's current national qualifications framework and awarded by the Brunei Darussalam Technical and Vocational Education Council (BDTVEC). It is equivalent to the National Diploma, although the latter has been phased out in government institutions. HNTec programmes are offered in the Institute of Brunei Technical Education and generally last two years. The qualification allows entry into Level 5-equivalent qualification, previously the Higher National Diploma. HNTec is the continuation of the National Technical Education Certificate (NTec).kk
