= Institute of Brunei Technical Education =

Coordinates: 4°54′15.28″N 114°54′38.92″E

- Institut Pendidikan Teknikal Brunei
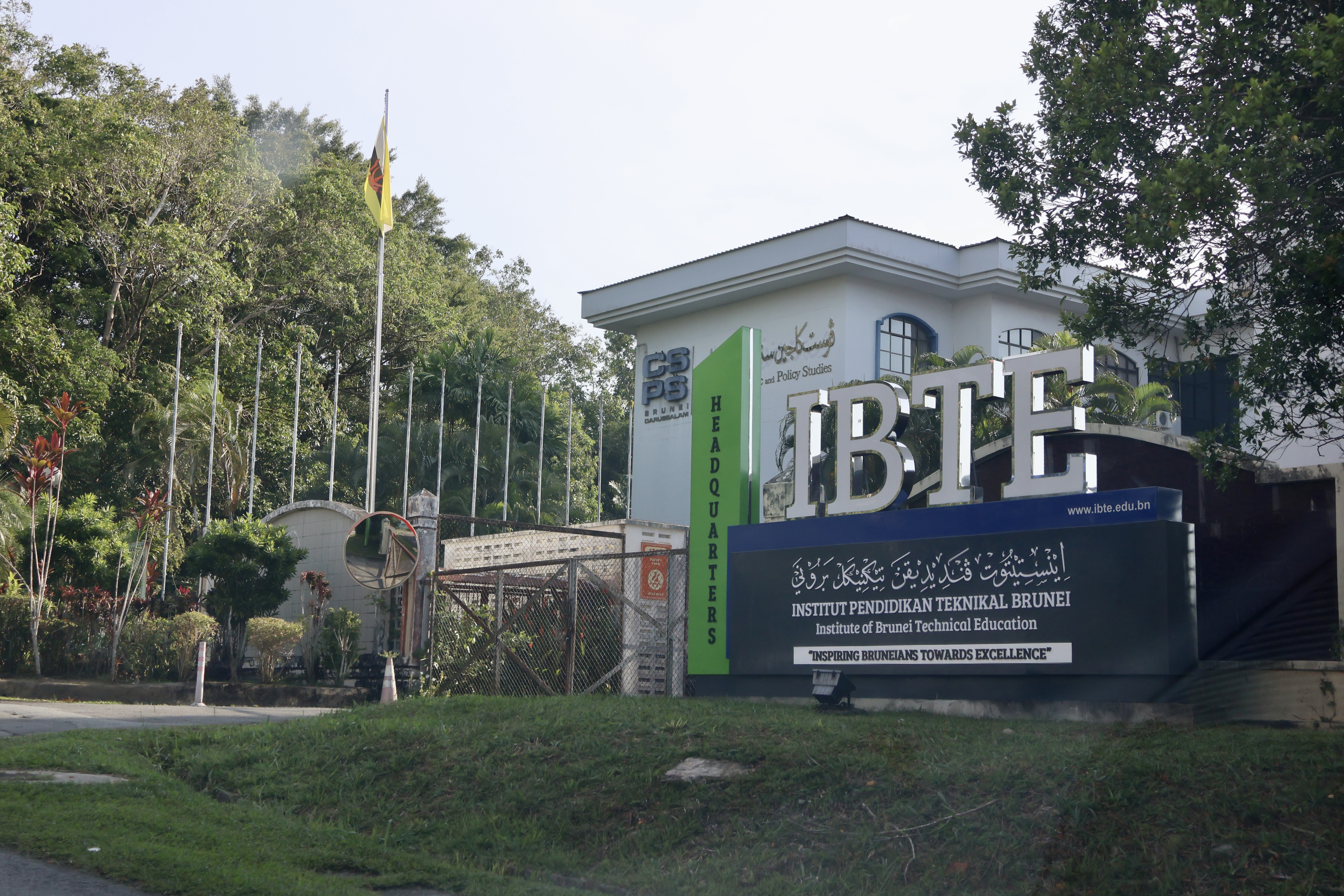
- Headquarters in Kiarong, Brunei
- Motto in English: Inspiring Bruneians Towards Excellence
- Type: Vocational
- Established: 2014
- Chairman: Romaizah Salleh
- CEO: Zamri Sabli
- Location: Brunei-Muara & Belait, Brunei
- Campus: Sultan Saiful Rijal, Nakhoda Ragam, Mechanical, Business, Jefri Bolkiah, Sultan Bolkiah & Agro-Technology
- Website: ibte.edu.bn

The Institute of Brunei Technical Education (Malay: Institut Pendidikan Teknikal Brunei; abbreviation: IBTE) is a post-secondary institution providing technical and vocational education in Brunei. IBTE was created on 27 May 2014 from the merger of the Department of Technical Education and seven technical and vocational schools nationwide.

== Institutions ==
Since 2016, the seven schools under IBTE have been restructured into two cluster of schools, namely IBTE Central and IBTE Satellite. The schools have also been renamed so as to reflect better their merger under one umbrella institution, taking up the terms 'IBTE' and 'Campus' as part of the new names.

Cluster Name	Name	Former name	Location (District)
IBTE Central	IBTE Sultan Saiful Rijal Campus	Sultan Saiful Rijal Technical College	Brunei-Muara
IBTE Central	IBTE Nakhoda Ragam Campus	Nakhoda Ragam Vocational School	Brunei-Muara
IBTE Central	IBTE Mechanical Campus	Mechanic Training Centre	Brunei-Muara
IBTE Central	IBTE Business Campus	Business School	Brunei-Muara
IBTE Satellite	IBTE Jefri Bolkiah Campus	Jefri Bolkiah College of Engineering	Belait
IBTE Satellite	IBTE Sultan Bolkiah Campus	Sultan Bolkiah Vocational School	Belait
IBTE Satellite	IBTE Agro-Technology Campus	Wasan Vocational School	Brunei-Muara

== Notable alumni ==
- Ishyra Asmin Jabidi (born 1998), national footballer
- Nur Asyraffahmi Norsamri (born 2000), national footballer
