= Education in Asia =

Education in Japão
MEXT

National education budget
- Budget: 5.3 trilhões de ienes

General details
- Primary languages: Japonês
- System type: Nacional

Literacy
- Total: 99%
- Primary: 100%
- Secondary: 99%
- Post secondary: 60%

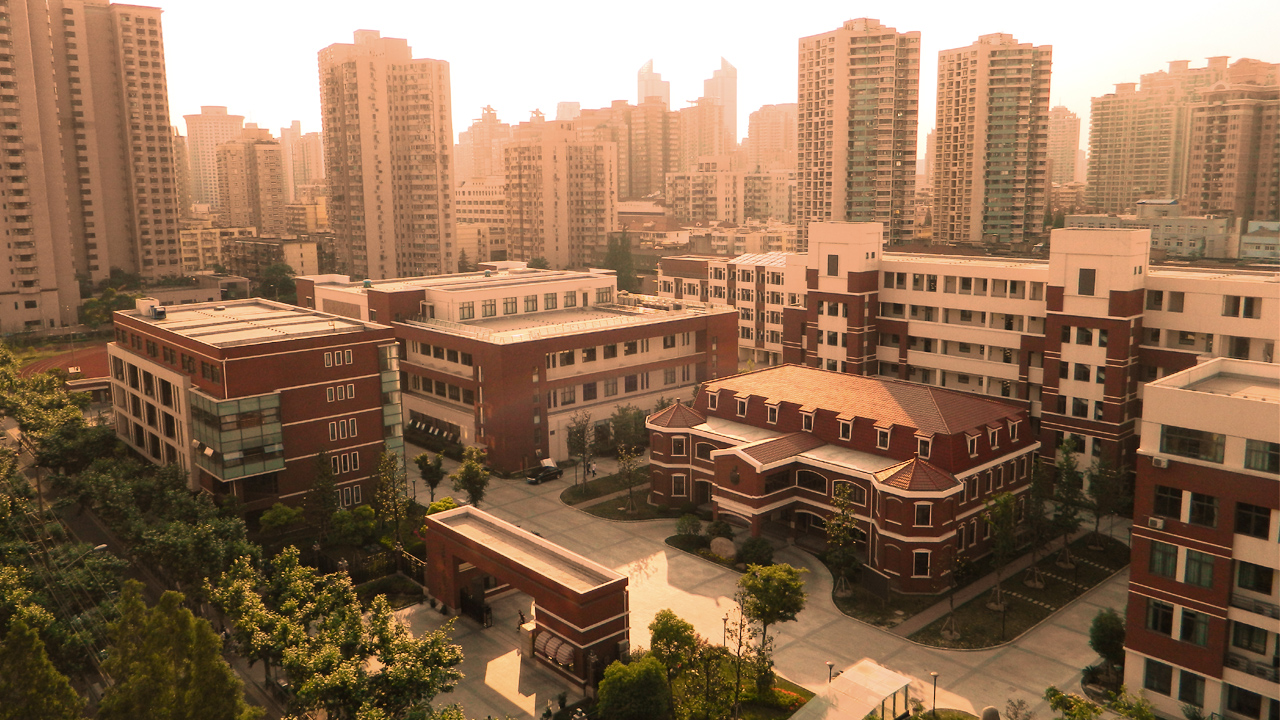
Aerial view of Nanyang Model High School in Shanghai, China, one of the oldest public secondary schools in Asia

Enrollment in educational institutions varies considerably across the continent of Asia, as evidenced by data maintained by United Nations Educational, Scientific and Cultural Organization (UNESCO). UNESCO's measurement categories for education are used in the context of international development work and are adopted by the World Bank in its EdStats database. The United Nations issues a Human Development Index for each nation, of which the Education Index is a component.

== List of Asia countries by level of literacy ==
The following table is taken from information gathered in the CIA World Factbook. Unless otherwise noted, a country’s reported literacy rate reflects the percentage of people aged 15 years and over who can read and write.

| Countries | Total population | Male | Female | Year | Notes |
|---|---|---|---|---|---|
| Afghanistan | 37.3% | 52.1% | 22.6% | 2021 | |
| Armenia | 99.8% | 99.8% | 99.7% | 2020 | |
| Azerbaijan | 99.8% | 99.9% | 99.7% | 2019 | |
| Bahrain | 97.5% | 99.9% | 94.9% | 2018 | |
| Bangladesh | 74.9% | 77.8% | 72% | 2020 | |
| Bhutan | 70.9% | 77.9% | 62.8% | 2021 | |
| Brunei | 97.6% | 98.3% | 96.9% | 2021 | |
| Cambodia | 83.9% | 88.4% | 79.8% | 2021 | |
| China | 96.8% | 98.5% | 95.2% | 2018 | |
| Cyprus | 99.4% | 99.6% | 99.2% | 2021 | |
| Egypt | 73.1% | 78.8% | 67.4% | 2021 | |
| Gaza Strip | 97.5% | 98.8% | 96.2% | 2020 | estimates are for Gaza Strip and the West Bank |
| (Georgia (country)) Georgia | 99.6% | 99.7% | 99.5% | 2019 | |
| Hong Kong | NA | NA | NA | NA | |
| India | 74.4% | 82.4% | 65.8% | 2018 | |
| Indonesia | 96% | 97.4% | 94.6% | 2020 | |
| Iran | 88.7% | 92.4% | 88.7% | 2021 | |
| Iraq | 85.6% | 91.2% | 79.9% | 2017 | |
| Israel | 97.8% | 98.7% | 96.8% | 2011 | |
| Japan | NA | NA | NA | NA | |
| Jordan | 98.4% | 98.7% | 98.4% | 2021 | |
| Kazakhstan | 99.8% | 99.8% | 99.7% | 2018 | |
| Kuwait | 96.5% | 97.1% | 95.4% | 2020 | |
| Kyrgyzstan | 99.6% | 99.7% | 99.5% | 2018 | |
| Laos | 87.1% | 91.4% | 81.4% | 2021 | |
| Lebanon | 95.1% | 96.9% | 93.3% | 2018 | |
| Macau | 97.1% | 98.5% | 95.9% | 2021 | |
| Malaysia | 95% | 96.2% | 93.6% | 2019 | |
| Maldives | 97.9% | 97.6% | 98.4% | 2021 | |
| Mongolia | 99.2% | 99.1% | 99.2% | 2020 | |
| Myanmar | 89.1% | 92.4% | 86.3% | 2019 | most public schools were closed immediately after the coup in 2021, and attendance has remained low since schools reopened; literacy is expected to decline from 2019 to 2023 |
| Nepal | 71.2% | 81% | 63.3% | 2021 | |
| North Korea | 100% | 100% | 100% | 2015 | |
| Oman | 95.7% | 97% | 92.7% | 2018 | |
| Pakistan | 58% | 69.3% | 46.5% | 2019 | |
| Philippines | 96.3% | 95.7% | 96.9% | 2019 | |
| Qatar | 93.5% | 92.4% | 94.7% | 2017 | |
| Russia | 99.7% | 99.7% | 99.7% | 2018 | |
| Saudi Arabia | 97.6% | 98.6% | 96% | 2020 | |
| Singapore | 97.5% | 98.9% | 96.1% | 2019 | |
| South Korea | 98.8%% | 99.2% | 98.4% | NA | |
| Sri Lanka | 92.3% | 93% | 91.6% | 2019 | |
| Syria | 86.4% | 91.7% | 81% | 2015 | |
| Taiwan | 98.5% | 99.7% | 97.3% | 2014 | |
| Tajikistan | 99.8% | 99.8% | 99.7% | 2015 | |
| Thailand | 94.1% | 95.5% | 92.8% | 2021 | |
| Timor-Leste | 68.1% | 71.9% | 64.2% | 2018 | |
| Turkey | 96.7% | 99.1% | 94.4% | 2019 | |
| Turkmenistan | 99.7% | 99.8% | 99.6% | 2015 | |
| United Arab Emirates | 98.1% | 98.8% | 97.2% | 2021 | |
| Uzbekistan | 100% | 100% | 100% | 2019 | |
| Vietnam | 95.8% | 97% | 94.6% | 2019 | |
| West Bank | 79% | 84% | 74.3% | 2021 | |
| Yemen | 70.1% | 85.1% | 55% | 2015 | |
| West Bank | 97.5% | 98.8% | 96.2% | 2020 | estimates are for Gaza and the West Bank |

== Participation in education ==
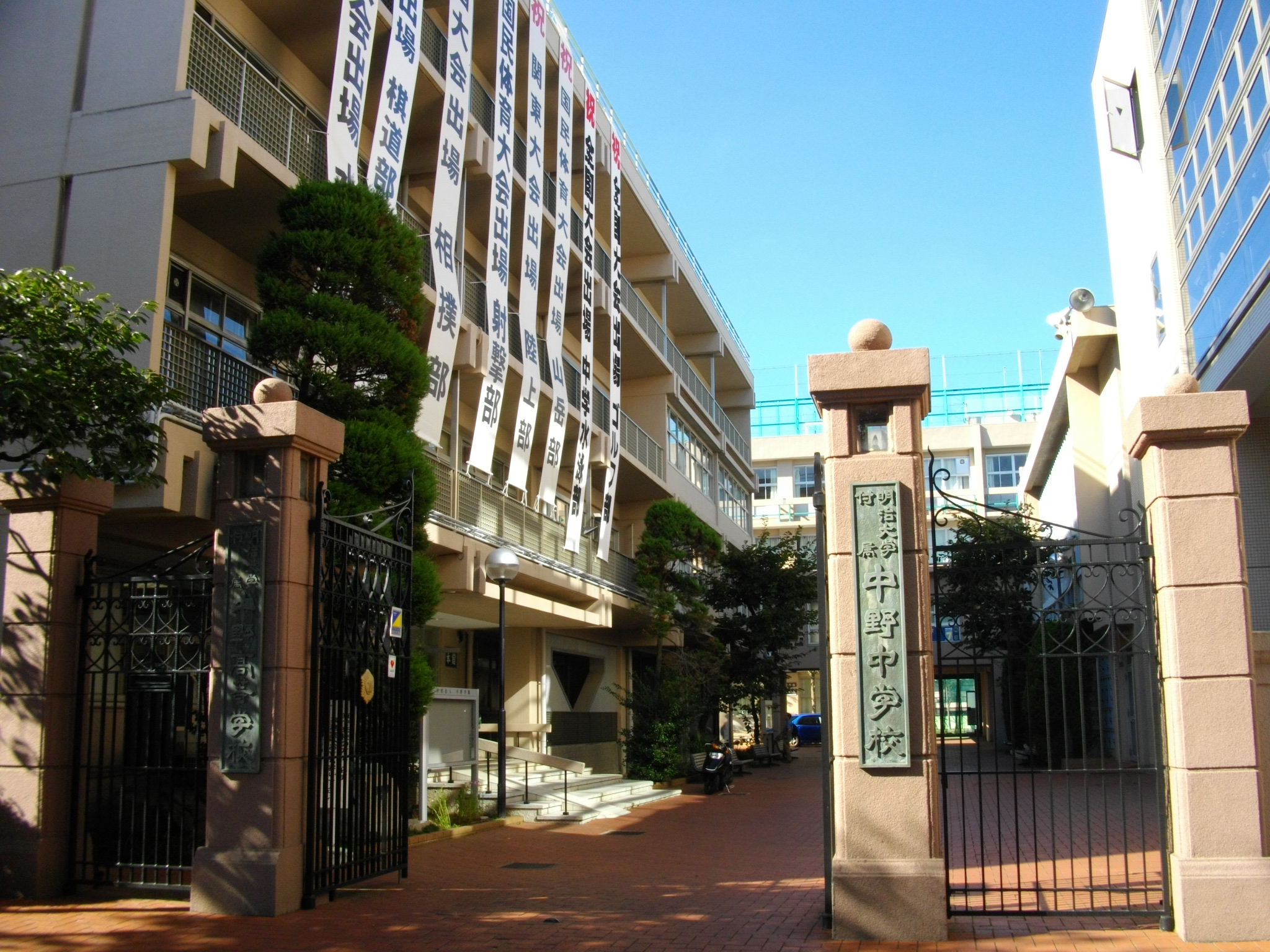
The Nakano Junior and Senior High School Attached to Meiji University, an example of an affiliation of primary, secondary, and tertiary institutions common in China, Japan, and Korea.

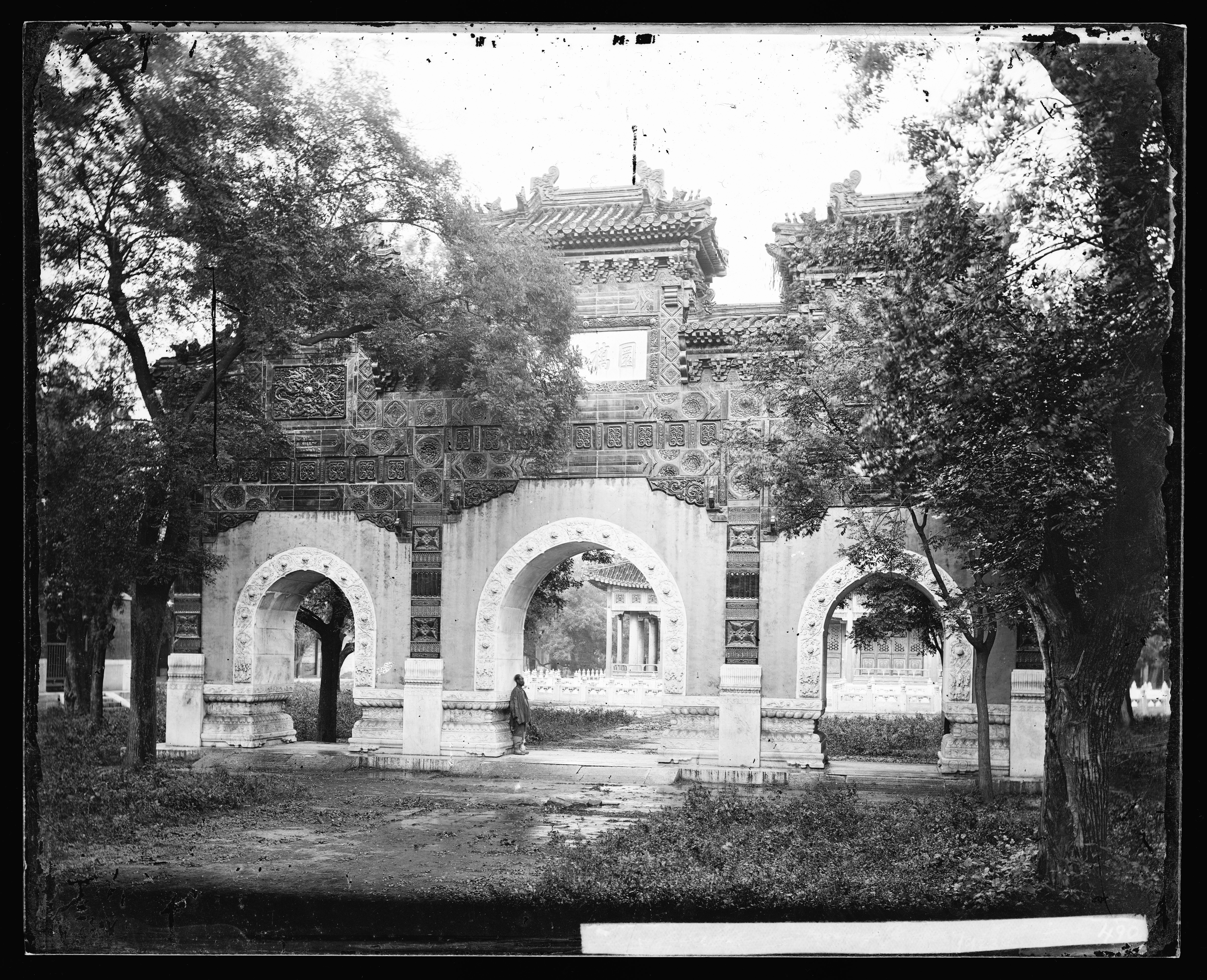
The Hall of Classics at Guozijian, in Beijing, China, which was the foremost Chinese institution of higher education throughout the Yuan, Ming, and Qing dynasties. During the imperial era of China, only a small fraction of the population received formal education.

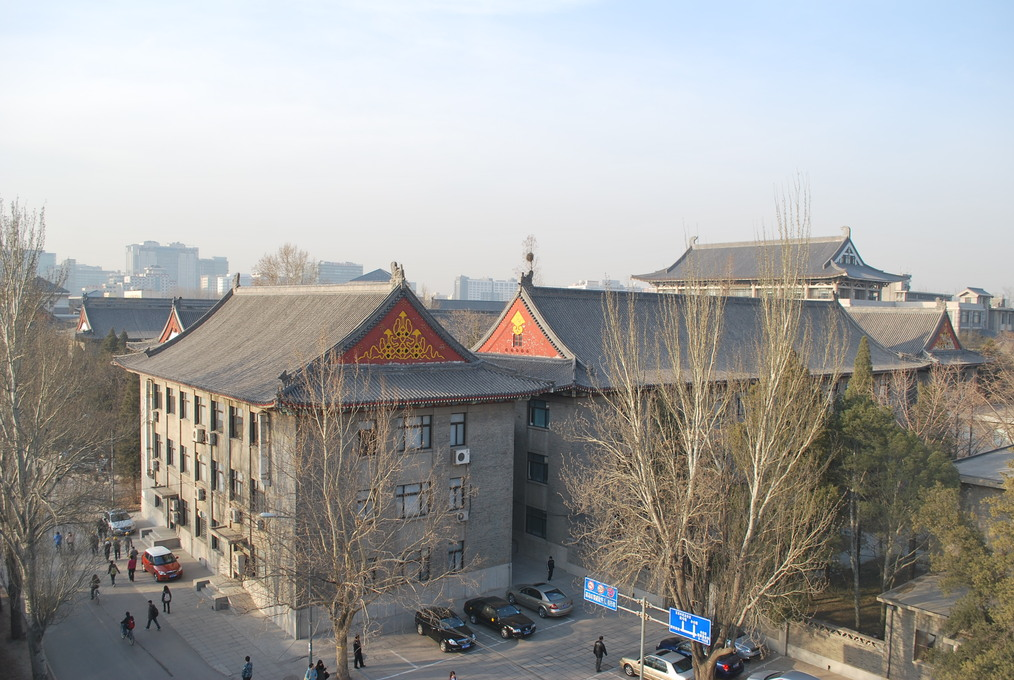
Academic buildings at Peking University, the modern successor of the Guozijian and a top-ranked university in China, Asia, and globally.

The Gross Enrollment Ratio (GER) is a component of the Education Index. It expresses the number of students enrolled in a given level of education as a percentage of the number of people within the official age for that level of education. GER can exceed 100% because some enrolled students may fall outside the official age range.

The tables below show GER for each country in Asia. It is organized into five regions of population: South Asia, East Asia, Southeast Asia, West Asia and Central Asia. Data is shown for four levels of education: pre-primary, primary, secondary and tertiary. (Tertiary education is also referred to as higher education).

The last year for which data are available is shown in parentheses following each number in the table. If the year is the same as for the column to the left, the year is omitted.

Gross Enrollment Ratio: South Asia
| Country | Population (millions) 2013 | Pre-primary | Primary | Secondary | Tertiary |
|---|---|---|---|---|---|
| Afghanistan | 30.6 | 1% (‘03) | 106% (’13) | 54% | 4% (’11) |
| Bangladesh | 156.6 | 33% (‘13) | 114 (’11) | 54% (’12) | 13% |
| Bhutan | 0.8 | 14% (‘13) | 107% | 78% | 11% |
| India | 1,252.1 | 58% (‘11) | 114% (’12) | 71% | 25% (’13) |
| Maldives | 0.3 | 83% (‘07) | 105% | 72% (’04) | 13% (’08) |
| Nepal | 27.8 | 87% (‘14) | 133% | 67% | 17% (’13) |
| Pakistan | 182.1 | 82% (‘13) | 92% | 38% | 10% |
| Sri Lanka | 21.1 | 90% (‘13) | 98% | 99% | 19% |

Gross Enrollment Ratio: East Asia
| Country | Population (millions) 2013 | Pre-primary | Primary | Secondary | Tertiary |
|---|---|---|---|---|---|
| China | 1,385.6 | 74% (‘13) | 126% | 92% | 30% |
| Japan | 127.1 | 88% (‘12) | 102% | 102% | 61% |
| Mongolia | 2.8 | 86% (‘12) | 109% (’13) | 92% (’10) | 62% (’13) |
| North Korea | 24.9 | NA | NA | NA | NA |
| South Korea | 49.3 | 93% (‘14) | 100% | 99% | 97% |
| Taiwan | NA | NA | NA | NA | NA |

Gross Enrollment Ratio: Southeast Asia
| Country | Population (millions) 2013 | Pre-primary | Primary | Secondary | Tertiary |
|---|---|---|---|---|---|
| Brunei | 0.4 | 64% (‘13) | 94% | 106% | 25% |
| Cambodia | 15.1 | 15% (‘13) | 125% | 45% (’08) | 16% (’11) |
| East Timor | 1.1 | 10% (‘05) | NA | NA | NA |
| Indonesia | 249.9 | 51% (‘13) | 109% (’12) | 83% (’13) | 32% (’12) |
| Laos | 6.7 | 26% (‘13) | NA | NA | NA |
| Malaysia | 29.7 | 84% (‘12) | 101% (’05) | 71% (’12) | 37% |
| Myanmar | 53.3 | 9% (‘10) | 114% | 50% | 13% (’12) |
| Philippines | 98.4 | 52% (‘09) | 107% (’13) | 85% | 34% |
| Singapore | NA | NA | NA | NA | NA |
| Thailand | 67.0 | 119% (‘13) | 100% | 86% | 51% |
| Vietnam | NA | NA | NA | NA | NA |

Gross Enrollment Ratio: West Asia
| Country | Population (millions) 2013 | Pre-primary | Primary | Secondary | Tertiary |
|---|---|---|---|---|---|
| Armenia | 3.0 | 46% (‘13) | 102% (’09) | 97% | 46% (’13) |
| Azerbaijan | NA | 25% (‘12) | 98% | 100% | 20% |
| Bahrain | 1.3 | 53% (‘13) | 104% (’99) | 101% (’11) | 40% ('14) |
| Cyprus | 0.9 ('12) | 78% (‘12) | 100% | 95% | 46% |
| Georgia | 4.3 | 58% (‘08) | NA | 101% (’13) | 33% |
| Iran | 77.4 | 38% (‘13) | 119% | 86% (’12) | 58% (’13) |
| Iraq | 33.8 | 7% (‘07) | 107% | 53% | 16% (’05) |
| Israel | 7.7 | 112% (‘13) | 104% | 102% | 67% |
| Jordan | 7.3 | 34% (‘12) | 98% | 88% | 47% |
| Kuwait | 3.4 | 81% (‘07) | 106% | 100% | 28% (’13) |
| Lebanon | 4.8 | 102% (‘13) | 113% | 75% | 48% |
| Oman | 3.6 | 52% (‘13) | 113% | 91% | 28% (’11) |
| Palestine | 4.3 | 78% (‘13) | 95% | 82% | 46% |
| Qatar | 2.2 | 58% (‘13) | 103% (’05) | 112% (’11) | 14% (’13) |
| Saudi Arabia | 28.3 | 17% (‘14) | NA | 124% | 58% (’13) |
| Syria | 21.9 | 6% (‘13) | 74% | 48% | 31% |
| Turkey | 74.0 | 28% (‘13) | 109% | 102% | 79% |
| UAE | 9.3 | 79% (‘11) | 108% (’12) | 84% (’99) | NA |
| Yemen | 24.4 | 1% (‘13) | 101% | 49% | 10% (’11) |

Gross Enrollment Ratio: Central Asia
| Country | Population (millions) 2013 | Pre-primary | Primary | Secondary | Tertiary |
|---|---|---|---|---|---|
| Kazakhstan | 16.4 | 58% (‘13) | 106% | 101% | 55% |
| Kyrgyzstan | 5.5 | 25% (‘12) | 109% (’13) | 88% | 48% |
| Tajikistan | 8.2 | 9% (‘11) | 96% (’14) | 87% (’12) | 24% (’14) |
| Turkmenistan | 5.2 | 63% (‘14) | 89% | 85% | 8% |
| Uzbekistan | 28.9 | 25% (‘11) | 93% | 105% | 9% |

== Challenges and Opportunities ==
=== Low GER ===
As Asian nations compete in the global economy and aspire to join the developed nations, there is concern that rates of education may not be keeping pace. By comparison, Gross Enrollment Rates for North America and Western Europe in 2013 were 84.3% for pre-primary, 101.1% for primary, 105.1% for secondary, and 76.6% for tertiary education.

=== Supply versus demand ===
Many Asian nations lack the capacity to scale up their enrollment to meet the escalating demand.

=== Quality in education at scale ===
There is also concern about a quality gap, as nations seek to scale up their enrollment quickly. A recent HSBC survey of 8400 parents in 15 Asia-Pacific countries revealed that parents from Hong Kong spend the most on their children's education to ensure a quality education that increases their competitiveness in the labor market. On average, parents in Hong Kong spend an average of $132,100 per child, which is almost three times as much as the global amount of $44,200. Singapore and Taiwan followed with education expenditures of $70,939 and $56,400 respectively.

=== Skills gap ===
There is concern about a gap between the education sought by the labor market and what is being taught in the educational institutions.

=== Progress ===
Even though many Asian nations still have low GER compared with their North American and Western European counterparts, there has been considerable progress in recent years. For example, consider the change in GER over ten years preceding the latest data reported, for the three most populous Asian countries: China, India and Indonesia. All three countries had achieved virtually universal primary education (close to 100%) before this ten-year period, so consider the other three levels. Over a ten-year period, China's GER increased from 40% to 74% for pre-primary, from 60% to 92% for secondary, and from 15% to 30% for tertiary education. India's GER increased from 25% to 58% for pre-primary, from 48% to 71% for secondary, and from 11% to 25% for tertiary education. Indonesia's GER increased from 26% to 51% for pre-primary, from 61% to 83% for secondary, and from 15% to 32% for tertiary education.

== See also ==
- School leaving age
