= Chandigarh Kare Aashiqui =

2021 Indian romantic drama film

- Theatrical release poster
- Directed by: Abhishek Kapoor
- Written by: Supratik Sen; Tushar Paranjpe
- Story by: Abhishek Kapoor; Supratik Sen; Tushar Paranjpe
- Produced by: Bhushan Kumar; Pragya Kapoor; Krishan Kumar; Abhishek Nayyar
- Starring: Ayushmann Khurrana; Vaani Kapoor
- Cinematography: Manoj Lobo
- Edited by: Chandan Arora
- Music by: Sachin–Jigar; Tanishk Bagchi
- Production companies: T-Series Films; Guy in the Sky Pictures
- Distributed by: AA Films
- Release date: 10 December 2021
- Running time: 116 minutes
- Country: India
- Language: Hindi
- Budget: ₹40 crore
- Box office: ₹41.23 crore

Chandigarh Kare Aashiqui (transl. Chandigarh Does Romance) is a 2021 Indian Hindi-language romantic comedy film directed by Abhishek Kapoor. It stars Ayushmann Khurrana and Vaani Kapoor, and was released theatrically on 10 December 2021.

At the 67th Filmfare Awards, Chandigarh Kare Aashiqui received 4 nominations, including Best Music Director (Sachin–Jigar and Best Female Playback Singer (Priya Saraiya for "Kalle Kalle"), and won Best Story (Abhishek Kapoor, Supratik Sen and Tushar Paranjape).

== Plot ==
Bodybuilder Manvinder "Manu" Munjal is the owner of a gym in Chandigarh, preparing for an annual competition "G.O.A.T". Unfortunately, his gym fails to attract clients until Zumba instructor Maanvi Brar walks into the gym and things start looking up financially. Manu falls in love with Maanvi and as they are about to have their first kiss, she says she wants to tell him something. However, Manu refuses to hear her out and initiates sex. Although hesitant at the beginning, she proceeds with it and they both approach climax. Later on, they begin a sexual relationship. Manu's family also likes Maanvi and his sisters encourage him to marry her. As Manu eventually expresses his intention of wanting to marry her, Maanvi reveals she is a trans woman. Enraged and flabbergasted, Manu says he's going to seek revenge. He is disgusted with himself because he keeps thinking he "has had sex with a man." His friends make derogatory references to Maanvi, which further infuriates him. Despite their fallout, they continue to love each other.

Maanvi did not share a close bond with her mother, but her father accepted her. Manu educates himself about trans women by watching videos, interacting with a trans woman and seeking counseling with his friends to conclude that his relationship with Maanvi is normal. Eventually, he realizes being born in a male body was a biological defect that Maanvi rectified via surgery, and only he had to step up and accept her for who she was. Preet and Meet, Manu's sisters, find out Maanvi's truth and insult her in public. As a result of public humiliation and her father's heart attack, she decides to leave Chandigarh. She rushes to the hospital, where Manu also shows up. He tells her that he wants to be with her, and stands up to his family for Maanvi.

Manu competes for the title of "G.O.A.T" and in the last round of the tournament, Maanvi shows up to root for him. Encouraged by her presence, he lifts extra weights and wins the competition. After his victory, he asks Maanvi in front of the crowds if she wants to be with him, and she says yes.

== Cast ==
- Ayushmann Khurrana as Manvinder "Manu" Munjal
- Vaani Kapoor as Maanvi Brar
  - Yash Bhojwani as Little Maanvi (Manu)
- Gourav Sharma as "Riz"
- Goutam Sharma as "Jomo"
- Abhishek Bajaj as Sandeep Kasaana aka Sandy
- Kanwaljit Singh as Brigadier Mohinder Brar, Maanvi's father
- Yograj Singh as Guruji
- Aanjjan Srivastav as Braj Munjal, Manu's grandfather
- Karishma Singh as Akshita
- Girish Dhamija as Naveen Munjal, Manu's father
- Tanya Abrol as Preet Munjal, Manu's sister
- Sawan Rupowali as Meet Munjal, Manu's sister
- Satwant Kaur as Navjot Brar
- Tarsen Paul as Mamaji
- Goni Sagoo as Mamiji
- Ranjit Punia as Ajit
- Nary Singh as Roopa
- Leena Sharma as Tasneem
- Jeevan Vadhera as Jogi
- Ssumier Pasricha as a Commentator
- Sumit Dhankar as Vicky
- Jaspal Kaur Bhatia as Dadiji
- Rahul Kakkar as Maanvi's ex-boyfriend
- Soniya Bhatia as Mrs. Munjal, Manu's mother
- Diljit Sona as Meet's husband
- Mukesh Chandelia as Senior Cop
- Harinder Singh Bhullar as a Police Constable
- Aarav Dua (child artist) as Kid 1
- Anav Dua (child artist) as Kid 2

== Production ==
Principal photography commenced on 21 October 2020 in Chandigarh. Filming was wrapped up on 22 December 2020.

== Soundtrack ==
Chandigarh Kare Aashiqui

Soundtrack album by Sachin–Jigar and Tanishk Bagchi
- Released: 4 December 2021
- Recorded: 2020–21
- Genre: Feature film soundtrack
- Length: 22:54
- Language: Hindi
- Label: T-Series

Official audio
- Chandigarh Kare Aashiqui - Full Album on YouTube

The film's music is composed by Sachin–Jigar and Tanishk Bagchi while the lyrics are written by IP Singh, Priya Saraiya and Vayu.

The song "Chandigarh Kare Aashiqui" is a remake of the song of the same name from the 2004 album Aashiqui by Jassi Sidhu and lyrics written by Madan Jalandhari.

Track Listing
No.	Title	Lyrics	Singer(s)	Length
1.	"Chandigarh Kare Aashiqui"	IP Singh	Sachin–Jigar, Jassi Sidhu, IP Singh	2:33
2.	"Tumbe Te Zumba"	IP Singh	Sukhwinder Singh	2:50
3.	"Kalle Kalle"	Priya Saraiya	Priya Saraiya	3:47
4.	"Kheench Te Nach"	Vayu	Vishal Dadlani, Shalmali Kholgade, Brijesh Shandilya	3:10
5.	"Maafi"	Priya Saraiya	Ayushmann Khurrana	4:20
6.	"Attraction"	Priya Saraiya	Mika Singh, Priya Saraiya	3:09
7.	"Maafi - Vibe Mix"	Priya Saraiya	Jubin Nautiyal	4:45
8.	"Chandigarh Kare Aashiqui 2.0" (Music by Tanishk Bagchi)	Vayu	Guru Randhawa, Jassi Sidhu, Zahrah S. Khan	3:05
Total length:				22:54

== Reception ==
=== Critical response ===
On the review aggregator website Rotten Tomatoes, 82% of 11 critics' reviews are positive, with an average rating of 6/10.

Hiren Kotwani of the Times of India rated the film with 4/5 and praised the direction of Abhishek Kapoor, writing, "he handles the hard-hitting reality of the subject with sensitivity and maturity". Umesh Punwani of Devesh Sharma of Filmfare gave the film a rating of 3.5/5 and wrote "Ayushmann and Vaani for giving their all to the film. The film isn’t without flaws but what it’s aiming at is such a huge thing that one would be wise to ignore them". Shubhra Gupta of Indian Express gave the film a rating of 2.5/5 and wrote "Ayushmann Khurrana, Chandigarh boy for real, is right at home in his bristly-brawny-softie Manu. Vaani Kapoor’s svelte certified physical trainer with a troubled past takes you back to the flash of promise she had shown in ‘Shuddh Desi Romance". Saibal Chatterjee of NDTV gave the film a rating of 2.5/5 and wrote "Despite all the woke noises that it seeks to make, it eventually does not budge an inch from its received wisdom about what constitutes masculinity".

=== Response from Queer Community ===
The film received mixed reviews from the queer community. In an article in Indian Journal of Medical Ethics, Queer writers Rohin Bhat and Kris Chudawala mentioned that the film missed the mark in proper representation of transgender community in the film. Satvik, in his review in The Quint stated that "the movie furthers transphobia through its improper depictions. The use of transphobic slurs in the movie do not help the cause". In her review of the movie for Gaysi, Ritushree Panigrahi says that she found resonance with the character of Manvi portrayed by Vaani Kapoor. Chintan Girish Modi for their review in Firstpost, calls the movie a landmark in terms of transgender representation in Indian film industry, calling it sensitive and dignified.

=== Box office ===
Chandigarh Kare Aashiqui earned ₹3.75 crores at the Indian box office on its opening day. On the second day, the film collected ₹4.87 crores. On the third day, the film collected ₹5.91 crores, with the total domestic opening weekend collection becoming ₹14.53 crore.

As of 20 January 2022, the film grossed ₹33.64 crore in India and ₹4.93 crore overseas, for a worldwide gross collection of ₹38.57 crore.

== Accolades ==
Year	Award	Category	Nominee(s)	Result	Ref.
2022	Filmfare Awards	Best Music Director	Sachin–Jigar	Nominated	
2022	Filmfare Awards	Best Female Playback Singer	Priya Saraiya for "Kalle Kalle"	Nominated	
2022	Filmfare Awards	Best Story	Abhishek Kapoor, Supratik Sen and Tushar Paranjape	Won	
2022	Filmfare Awards	Best Sound Design	Sanjay Maurya, Allwin Rego	Nominated	
2022	IIFA Awards	Best Female Playback Singer	Priya Saraiya for "Kalle Kalle"	Nominated	
2022	ITA Awards	Film with Social Impact	Chandigarh Kare Aashiqui	Won	
2022	Gold Awards	Best Powerpack Performance	Vaani Kapoor	Won	
2022	Mirchi Music Awards	Recreated Song of the Year	Sachin–Jigar, Jassi Sidhu, I.P. Singh for "Chandigarh Kare Aashiqui"	Nominated	
