= Azaad (2025 film) =

2025 Indian film by Abhishek Kapoor

- Theatrical release poster
- Directed by: Abhishek Kapoor
- Screenplay by: Ritesh Shah; Suresh Nair; Chandan Arora
- Story by: Ritesh Shah; Suresh Nair; Abhishek Kapoor
- Produced by: Ronnie Screwvala; Pragya Kapoor
- Starring: Ajay Devgn; Diana Penty; Aaman Devgan; Rasha Thadani
- Cinematography: Satyajit Pande (Setu)
- Edited by: Chandan Arora
- Music by: Songs: Amit Trivedi; Score: Hitesh Sonik
- Production companies: RSVP Movies; Guy In The Sky Pictures
- Distributed by: AA Films
- Release date: 17 January 2025
- Running time: 145 minutes
- Country: India
- Language: Hindi
- Budget: ₹80 crore
- Box office: ₹9.17 crore

Azaad (transl. Free) is a 2025 Indian Hindi-language period drama film directed by Abhishek Kapoor and produced by Ronnie Screwvala and Pragya Kapoor. The film stars Ajay Devgn(in a extended cameo) and Diana Penty alongside debutants Aaman Devgan and Rasha Thadani.

Azaad was theatrically released on 17 January 2025, to mixed-to-negative reviews from critics, and became a box office bomb.

== Plot ==
The film begins with Govind living under the harsh rule of Rai Bahadur and his family. In the opening scene, he is severely punished for the perceived transgression of riding Rai Bahadur's horses, a privilege reserved only for the upper class. This incident highlights the stark social inequalities prevalent in the region.

Govind's life takes an unexpected turn when he splashes Holi colors on Janaki, Rai Bahadur's daughter. Thinking he might get more punishment Govind runs away only to be found by the Baagi crew, led by Vikram Singh.

Parallel to Govind's story is that of Vikram, a local rebel fighting against the injustices inflicted by Rai Bahadur. Vikram's former girlfriend Kesar is forcibly married to Rai Bahadur's son Tej. Despite her forced wedding, she secretly remains in contact with Vikram, meeting him even after years have passed.

Vikram is eventually betrayed by a member of his own group and is left fatally wounded in an attack. Before his death, he entrusts Govind with the responsibility of caring for Azaad, a magnificent horse.

Initially, Govind faces significant challenges in bonding with Azaad. However, with the help of Janaki, who shows kindness and understanding towards Govind, he gradually earns the horse's trust. This shared experience also fosters feelings of love between Govind and Janaki, bridging the gap between their social classes.

James, the son of a British official, attempts to buy Azaad, but Govind refuses, valuing the bond he has formed with the animal. This defiance leads to Govind being lashed again, and Rai Bahadur resorts to extreme measures, and James' attempting to forcefully ship Azaad to England for training.

Govind, with the help of Janaki, manages to rescue Azaad just as he is about to be taken away. Together, they escape and participate in a local horse racing competition. Despite facing numerous obstacles, including Tej Bahadur attempting to injure Azaad during the race, Govind perseveres and wins.

With high stakes, Govind's victory not only saves his community from being forced into exploitative labour in factories but also symbolises a triumph against oppression and injustice, bringing down the landowner's exploitative plan.

== Cast ==
- Ajay Devgn as Vikram Singh
- Diana Penty as Kesar Bahadur
- Aaman Devgan as Govind
- Rasha Thadani as Janaki Bahadur
- Mohit Malik as Tej Bahadur
- Piyush Mishra as Rai Bahadur
- Natasha Rastogi as Nani
- Sandeep Shikhar as Braj
- Jiya Imran Amin as Daani
- Mukund Ramesh Pal as Rajab
- Gaurav Yavanika as Jai Singh
- Andrew Crouch as James Cummings
- Dylan Jones as Lord Cummings
- Rakesh Sharma as Jamal
- Akshay Anand as Biru
- Jagannath Seth as Dacoit
- Khusboo Ajwani as Maid
- Arvind Bilgaiyan as Munimji
- Alok Porwal as Bearer Ratan Singh
- Ramshankar as Pandit British Residency
- Neeraj Kadela as Mute Priest
- Ravindra Dubey as Priest at Zamindar House
- Rakesh Bidua as Kesar's father
- Aishwarya Sharma as Janaki's friend
- Vivek Bahaduria as Bhusar shopkeeper

== Marketing ==
The film was announced by Ajay Devgn during the promotion of Singham Again on 30 October 2024 and the teaser was released on 5 November 2024. While the release date of the film was announced on 30 November 2024, the trailer was dropped on 6 January 2025.

== Music ==
Azaad

Soundtrack album by Amit Trivedi
- Released: 10 January 2025
- Genre: Feature film soundtrack
- Length: 19:50
- Language: Hindi
- Label: Zee Music Company

Amit Trivedi chronology
Tera Kya Hoga Lovely (2024)	Azaad (2025)	Kaalidhar Laapata (2025)

Official audio
- Azaad Full Album on YouTube

The music of the film is composed by Amit Trivedi while lyrics are written by Amitabh Bhattacharya and Swanand Kirkire. The first single titled "Birangay" was released on 12 December 2024. The second single titled "Azaad Hai Tu" was released on 22 December 2024. The third single titled "Uyi Amma" was released on 4 January 2025. The fourth single "Ajeeb-O-Gareeb" was released on 10 January 2025.

Track listing
No.	Title	Lyrics	Singer(s)	Length
1.	"Ajeeb-O-Gareeb"	Amitabh Bhattacharya	Arijit Singh, Hansika Pareek	4:15
2.	"Azaad Hai Tu"	Swanand Kirkire, Amitabh Bhattacharya	Arijit Singh, Amit Trivedi	3:58
3.	"Birangay"	Amitabh Bhattacharya	Amit Trivedi, Meenal Jain	3:22
4.	"Uyi Amma"	Amitabh Bhattacharya	Madhubanti Bagchi	4:13
5.	"Azaad Hai Tu" (Reprise)	Amitabh Bhattacharya	Amit Trivedi	4:02
Total length:				19:50

== Release ==
The film was theatrically released on 17 January 2025 and it began streaming on Netflix from 14 March 2025.

== Reception ==
=== Critical response ===
Bollywood Hungama rated the movie 2.0/5 and said, "AZAAD movie struggles to captivate due to a lackluster first half, a weak script, and the absence of a romantic angle. At the box office, the limited buzz around the film will pose challenges, though the Cinema Lovers Day offer might provide some relief to an extent on Day 1."

Pinkvilla rated the movie 3/5 and said, "Azaad is worth a watch for those interested in a simple, well-made period piece that doesn't aim to reinvent the wheel but rolls smoothly along the path laid before it. You can watch Azaad in theatres now. Are you going to watch the movie in theatres? Let us know."

Abhishek Srivastava from Timesofindia rated the movie 3/5 and said, "While ‘Azaad’ has moments of grandeur, it is overshadowed by an overall lack of emotional and narrative payoff. It is a grand spectacle with noble intentions but leaves a muted impression."

Saibal Chatterjee of NDTV rated the movie 1.5/5 and said "The weak and disjointed screenplay stymies the efforts of the two newcomers, Raveena Tandon's daughter Rasha Thadani and Ajay Devgn's nephew Aaman Devgan, to make an impression."

Shubhra Gupta of Indian express rated the movie 1/5 and said "Rasha Thadani, Aaman Devgan wasted in moth-balled film. Why are such films still being made in 2025? And is Abhishek Kapoor, who made the terrific ‘Kai Po Che’ and ‘Rock On’, really the director of this mothballed exercise?"

Vineeta Kumar of India Today rated the movie 2.5/5 and said "In Azaad, Rasha Thadani and Amaan Devgan look promising with their debut performance, but that's not enough. This Abhishek Kapoor film looks extremely one-toned, and relies heavily on anthropomorphism."

=== Box office ===
The film collected ₹1.40 crore on its opening day. On 5th day of its release the movie collected 4.8cr. It concluded its theatrical run with worldwide gross estimated to be ₹9.09–10 crore.
