= Rock On!! =

2008 Indian film by Abhishek Kapoor

- Theatrical release poster
- Directed by: Abhishek Kapoor
- Screenplay by: Pubali Chaudhari
- Dialogues by: Farhan Akhtar
- Story by: Abhishek Kapoor
- Produced by: Farhan Akhtar; Ritesh Sidhwani
- Starring: Farhan Akhtar; Arjun Rampal; Purab Kohli; Luke Kenny; Prachi Desai; Shahana Goswami; Koel Purie; Nicolette Bird
- Cinematography: Jason West
- Edited by: Deepa Bhatia
- Music by: Shankar–Ehsaan–Loy
- Production company: Excel Entertainment
- Distributed by: BIG Pictures
- Release date: 29 August 2008
- Running time: 145 minutes
- Country: India
- Language: Hindi
- Budget: ₹8–9 crore
- Box office: est. ₹36 crore

Rock On!! is a 2008 Indian Hindi-language musical drama film written and directed by Abhishek Kapoor and produced by Farhan Akhtar and Ritesh Sidhwani under the banner Excel Entertainment. The film stars Akhtar (in his acting debut), Arjun Rampal, Purab Kohli, and Luke Kenny as members of the Mumbai-based rock band "Magik" formed in 1998 who reunited in 2008. Prachi Desai, Shahana Goswami, Koel Purie, and Nicolette Bird appear in supporting roles. Rock On!! received critical acclaim from critics, but performed averagely at the box-office. The film was archived at the Academy Film Archive library. It won seven awards at the 54th Filmfare Awards and two awards at the 57th National Film Awards.

A sequel, Rock On 2, was released eight years later in 2016.

== Plot ==
Rock On!! begins in Mumbai, with the rock band Magik, in 1998. The band are best friends and enjoy a carefree, freewheeling life together. Aditya Shroff is the lead singer who rebelled against his well-to-do family to play music. Joseph (Joe) Mascarenhas is the lead guitarist who feels the necessity to prove his worth as a musician. Keyboardist Rob Nancy and drummer Kedar Zaveri a.k.a. KD/"Killer Drummer" comprise the remainder of the band. After a competition is announced by Channel V, they decide to enter, as the winner will be offered an album contract and at least one music video.

Magik win the competition but soon realise they will have to go through some sacrifices while signing the contract. Joe feels the most slighted when a song he wrote for his girlfriend, Debbie, which was the only slow track on the entire album, is excluded from the track list to make space for a remix song. Debbie is also rejected as the band's stylist without even being called for any demonstration. Later, when filming the music video, the band are forced to wear clothes they do not like, and the cameramen focus only on Aditya. Joe becomes furious at Aditya and the director, hitting them both before leaving with Debbie. Aditya, who failed to notice that anything was amiss, is shocked and as the band loses their contract, he reacts by abandoning music as well as his girlfriend Tanya. "Magik" thus disbands, and its members become estranged.

Ten years later, Aditya is a wealthy, high-powered investment banker with a beautiful wife, Sakshi, and they live in a luxury home, yet he is constantly unhappy. Hoping to relieve his habitual sullen mood, Sakshi decides to gift him a gold-chain wristwatch for his birthday. She meets her friend Devika at a jewellery shop, which by chance is owned by KD's father and where KD himself is working, albeit unenthusiastically. He overhears Sakshi talking about Aditya and introduces himself. Sakshi later conveys the meeting to Aditya who denies having ever known anyone called KD. Soon afterwards, while Aditya is away on a business trip, Sakshi finds a box containing old photos and videos of Magik. She takes them to show KD and asks him to come to a birthday party she is planning for Aditya, and to invite the rest of the band.

KD meets with Rob, who now makes a living composing jingles for advertisements. Together, they invite Joe, who is now married to Debbie but lives largely unemployed, with an eight-year-old son. The family is supported by Debbie, who has a small fishing business but who also holds a grudge against the band for the way it affected Joe. Joe feels he should reconcile with his old friends, but Debbie sees this as his weakness. KD and Rob thus attend the party without Joe, and Aditya is shocked to see them. He later scolds Sakshi for trying to dig up his past, which he claims to have left behind. Sakshi is hurt, and she leaves him after informing him that she is pregnant. Devika persuades Aditya to face his past and meet with his ex-bandmates. KD, Joe, and Rob meet up and visit the place where they used to practice as a band. Aditya also arrives and reconciles with Joe and the rest. They start practicing regularly at Aditya's house. Learning about this, Sakshi, too, returns to Aditya.

Channel V announces another contest, and at Rob's insistence, the band enters, this time with support from Ajay, the frontman of one of Magik's former rival groups, who informs the band that his group doesn't play anymore and he is thus good to help them enter the contest. Meanwhile, Debbie arranges a guitar-playing job for Joe on a cruise ship, which is due to set sail on the same day as the contest. At a party, Aditya runs into Tanya, who is revealed to be married to Ajay. Aditya apologizes to Tanya for his actions, and she forgives him. It is later discovered that Rob is dying of a brain tumor, and his last wish is to perform with Magik. The contest is aired on the radio, and while Joe is on his way to the airport, he hears Magik perform the song he wrote for Debbie ten years earlier, which they dedicate to him. This prompts him to join the band at the competition, where he and Aditya sing a duet in a triumphant performance.

The epilogue reveals that Rob died two months after that performance. Sakshi gives birth to a baby boy, whom they name "Rob" in memory of their friend. Devika is dating KD, who starts a record company with Joe. Debbie quits her job in the fishing business and becomes a successful stylist. The band members and their families meet every weekend to keep the band's "Magik" alive forever.

== Cast ==
- Farhan Akhtar as Aditya Shroff (Adi)
- Arjun Rampal as Joseph Mascarenhas (Joe)
- Purab Kohli as Kedar Zaveri aka "Killer Drummer" and "KD"
- Luke Kenny as Rob Nancy
- Prachi Desai as Sakshi Shroff, Adi's wife
- Shahana Goswami as Debbie Mascarenhas, Joe's wife
- Koel Purie as Devika
- Dalip Tahil as Bajaj
- Suraj Jagan as Ajay
- Nicolette Bird as Tanya, Adi's ex-girlfriend
- Mickey Makhija as KD's father
- Jameel Khan as Tolani
- Jonathan Horovitz as Travel Writer
- Pankaj Kalra as Sukhani
- Jehangir Karkaria as Khursheed Chacha
- Anu Malik as himself (special appearance)
- Monica Dogra as Herself (special appearance)

== Reception ==
=== Box office ===
Despite critical acclaim, the film grossed only ₹ 27.46 crore ($4.1 million) in India; Box Office India labeled it as an "average grosser".

=== Critical reception ===
Rock On was well received by a number of critics. Subhash K. Jha gave Rock On a rave review. He states: "Seldom has a film blended the music of life into the fabric of a film with such seamless expertise. Rock On!! is that rarity where every component character and episode falls into place with fluent virility." Nikhat Kazmi of the Times of India gave it four stars and argued, "if you really want to see how Bollywood has matured and come of age, then here's the perfect litmus test. For Rock On is a film that not only breaks new ground in terms of its subject matter – now when has desi movielore ever tackled something akin to Hollywood's That Thing You Do – it creates a whole new EQ (emotional quotient) for mainstream cinema." Khalid Mohamed, of the Hindustan Times gave the film three and a half out of four stars and describes it as "hard candy." He also states that "the performances are of the highest order". Manish Gajjar of the BBC gave Rock On!! four out of five stars and describes it as "an enthralling watch, with entertaining moments to make you smile. Predicted to be a cult movie for many years to come, it truly deserves the Bollywood awards this year! A must-see whether you are a rock fan or not!" Taran Adarsh of Bollywood Hungama gave Rock On!! four out of five stars and states: "Put your hands together for one of the finest films of our times. Put your hands together for a director who pulls off a challenging subject with élan. Put your hands together for the actors who pitch in superlative performances." Kaveree Bamzai of India Today called Rock On "refreshing" and "surprisingly quiet and thoughtful."

Other critics gave the film mixed reviews. Rajeev Masand of CNN-IBN gave the film three out of five stars and states: "With Rock On, director Abhishek Kapoor promises a true-blue band film, but ultimately delivers a masala Hindi film that just happens to be about a band [...] Yet, Rock On is rescued by some marvelous moments that stay with you until the end."

== Soundtrack ==
The original score and songs were composed by Shankar–Ehsaan–Loy. The songs' lyrics were written by Javed Akhtar. According to the Indian trade website Box Office India, with around 12,00,000 units sold, this film's soundtrack album was the year's thirteenth highest-selling.

== Accolades ==
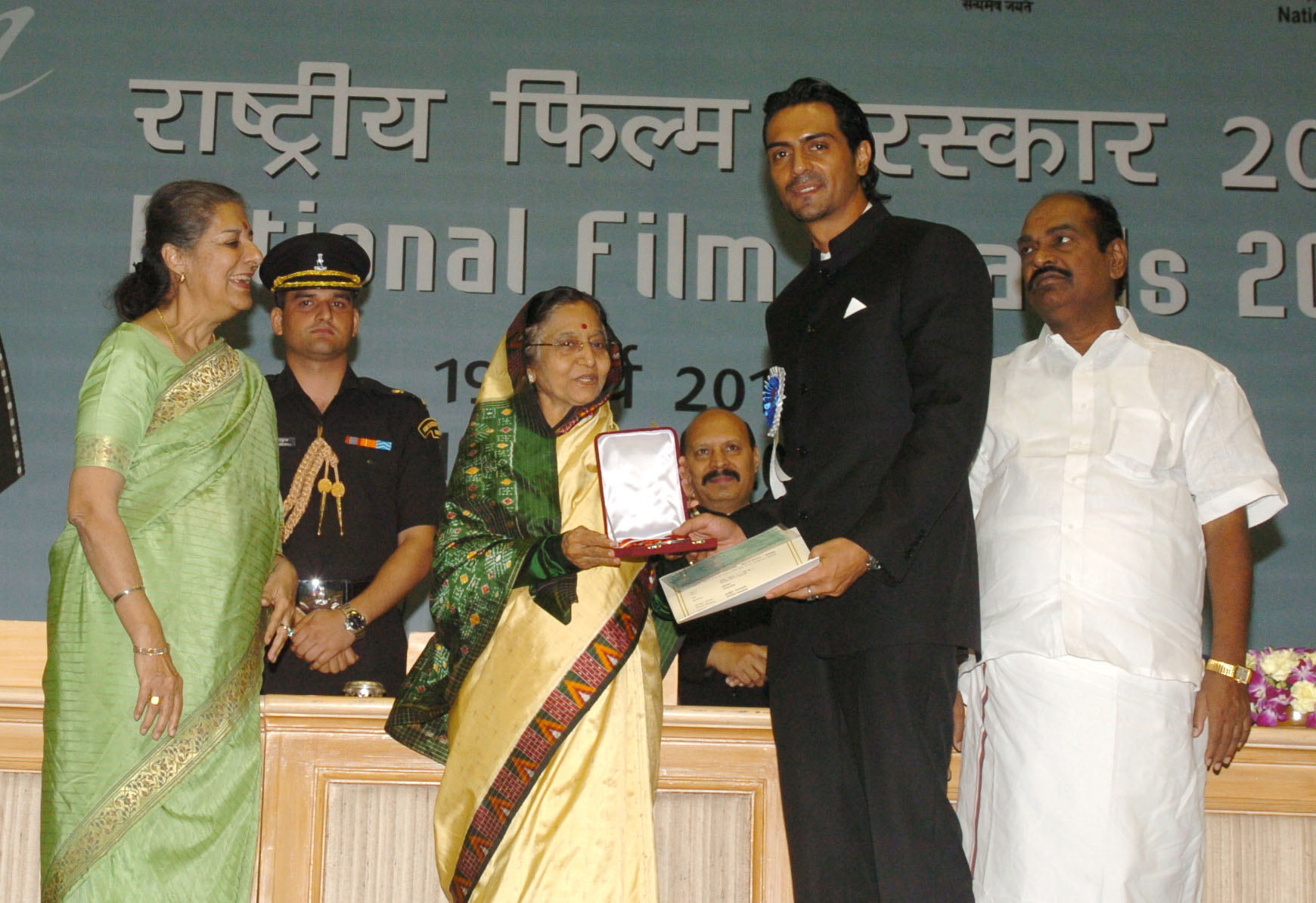
Arjun Rampal receiving the National Film Award for Best Supporting Actor for Hindi film “Rock On”, at the 56th National Film Awards function, 2010.

Award (Note: Awards, festivals and organizations are in alphabetical order.)	Date of ceremony (Note: Date is linked to the article about the awards held that year, wherever possible.)	Category	Recipient(s)	Result	Ref.
Anandalok Puraskar Awards	5 December 2009	Best Actress (Hindi)	Prachi Desai	Won	
Filmfare Awards	28 February 2009	Best Film	Rock On!!	Nominated	
Filmfare Awards	28 February 2009	Best Director	Abhishek Kapoor	Nominated	
Filmfare Awards	28 February 2009	Best Story	Abhishek Kapoor	Won	
Filmfare Awards	28 February 2009	Best Screenplay	Abhishek Kapoor	Nominated	
Filmfare Awards	28 February 2009	Best Supporting Actor	Arjun Rampal	Won	
Filmfare Awards	28 February 2009	Best Actress (Critics)	Shahana Goswami	Won	
Filmfare Awards	28 February 2009	Best Supporting Actress	Shahana Goswami	Nominated	
Filmfare Awards	28 February 2009	Best Male Debut	Farhan Akhtar	Won	
Filmfare Awards	28 February 2009	Best Female Debut	Prachi Desai	Nominated	
Filmfare Awards	28 February 2009	Special Award	Purab Kohli	Won	
Filmfare Awards	28 February 2009	Best Music Director	Shankar–Ehsaan–Loy	Nominated	
Filmfare Awards	28 February 2009	Best Lyricist	Javed Akhtar for "Socha Hai"	Nominated	
Filmfare Awards	28 February 2009	Best Male Playback Singer	Farhan Akhtar for "Socha Hai"	Nominated	
Filmfare Awards	28 February 2009	Best Cinematography	Jason West	Won	
Filmfare Awards	28 February 2009	Best Sound Design	Baylon Fonseca	Won	
Filmfare Awards	28 February 2009	Best Scene of the Year	Rock On!!	Nominated	
International Indian Film Academy Awards	11–13 June 2009	Best Film	Rock On!!	Nominated	
International Indian Film Academy Awards	11–13 June 2009	Best Director	Abhishek Kapoor	Nominated	
International Indian Film Academy Awards	11–13 June 2009	Best Story	Abhishek Kapoor	Nominated	
International Indian Film Academy Awards	11–13 June 2009	Best Supporting Actor	Arjun Rampal	Won	
International Indian Film Academy Awards	11–13 June 2009	Best Supporting Actress	Shahana Goswami	Nominated	
International Indian Film Academy Awards	11–13 June 2009	Best Male Debut	Farhan Akhtar	Won	
International Indian Film Academy Awards	11–13 June 2009	Best Music Director	Shankar–Ehsaan–Loy	Nominated	
International Indian Film Academy Awards	11–13 June 2009	Best Lyricist	Javed Akhtar for "Socha Hai"	Nominated	
International Indian Film Academy Awards	11–13 June 2009	Best Male Playback Singer	Farhan Akhtar for "Socha Hai"	Nominated	
International Indian Film Academy Awards	11–13 June 2009	Best Cinematography	Jason West	Won	
International Indian Film Academy Awards	11–13 June 2009	Best Sound Recording	Baylon Fonseca	Won	
Mirchi Music Awards	28 March 2009	Upcoming Female Vocalist of The Year	Dominique Cerejo for "Yeh Tumhari Meri Baatein"	Won	
National Film Awards	20 March 2010	Best Feature Film in Hindi	Producer: Farhan Akhtar, Ritesh Sidhwani; Director: Abhishek Kapoor	Won	
National Film Awards	20 March 2010	Best Supporting Actor	Arjun Rampal	Won	
Producers Guild Film Awards (Note: Previously known as Apsara Film & Television Producers Guild Awards.)	5 December 2009	Best Film	Rock On!!	Nominated	
Producers Guild Film Awards	5 December 2009	Best Director	Abhishek Kapoor	Nominated	
Producers Guild Film Awards	5 December 2009	Best Story	Abhishek Kapoor	Nominated	
Producers Guild Film Awards	5 December 2009	Best Dialogues	Farhan Akhtar	Nominated	
Producers Guild Film Awards	5 December 2009	Best Actor in a Supporting Role	Purab Kohli	Nominated	
Producers Guild Film Awards	5 December 2009	Best Actress in a Supporting Role	Shahana Goswami	Nominated	
Producers Guild Film Awards	5 December 2009	Best Music Director	Shankar–Ehsaan–Loy	Nominated	
Producers Guild Film Awards	5 December 2009	Best Female Playback Singer	Dominique Cerejo for "Yeh Tumhari Meri Baatein"	Nominated	
Producers Guild Film Awards	5 December 2009	Best Editing	Deepa Bhatia	Nominated	
Producers Guild Film Awards	5 December 2009	Best Sound Design	Baylon Fonseca	Won	
Producers Guild Film Awards	5 December 2009	Best Re-Recording	Anup Dev	Nominated	
Screen Awards	14 January 2009	Best Film	Rock On!!	Nominated	
Screen Awards	14 January 2009	Best Director	Abhishek Kapoor	Nominated	
Screen Awards	14 January 2009	Best Screenplay	Abhishek Kapoor, Pubali Chaudhary	Nominated	
Screen Awards	14 January 2009	Best Cinematography	Jason West	Won	
Screen Awards	14 January 2009	Best Supporting Actor	Arjun Rampal	Won	
Screen Awards	14 January 2009	Best Supporting Actress	Shahana Goswami	Won	
Screen Awards	14 January 2009	Best Male Debut	Farhan Akhtar	Won	
Screen Awards	14 January 2009	Best Female Debut	Prachi Desai	Nominated	
Screen Awards	14 January 2009	Best Music Director	Shankar–Ehsaan–Loy	Nominated	
Screen Awards	14 January 2009	Best Background Music	Shankar–Ehsaan–Loy	Nominated	
Screen Awards	14 January 2009	Best Female Playback Singer	Dominique Cerejo for "Yeh Tumhari Meri Baatein"	Nominated	
Screen Awards	14 January 2009	Best Editing	Deepa Bhatia	Won	
Screen Awards	14 January 2009	Best Art Direction	Shashank Tere	Won	
Stardust Awards	15 February 2009	Hottest New Director	Abhishek Kapoor	Nominated	
Stardust Awards	15 February 2009	Best Debut Director (Critics)	Abhishek Kapoor	Won	
Stardust Awards	15 February 2009	Superstar of Tomorrow – Male	Farhan Akhtar	Won	
Stardust Awards	15 February 2009	Superstar of Tomorrow – Female	Prachi Desai	Nominated	
Stardust Awards	15 February 2009	Breakthrough Performance – Male	Purab Kohli	Nominated	
Stardust Awards	15 February 2009	Breakthrough Performance – Female	Shahana Goswami	Nominated	
Stardust Awards	15 February 2009	Best Supporting Actor	Arjun Rampal	Nominated	
Stardust Awards	15 February 2009	New Musical Sensation – Male	Farhan Akhtar for "Tum Ho Toh"	Nominated	
Stardust Awards	15 February 2009	New Musical Sensation – Female	Dominique Cerejo for "Yeh Tumhari Meri Baatein"	Nominated	

== Sequel ==
A sequel to the film, Rock On 2, was released on 11 November 2016. Akhtar, Rampal, Kohli, Desai and Goswami reprise their roles from the first film.
