= Abhishek Kapoor =

Indian filmmaker

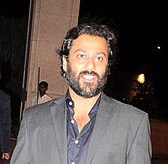
- Kapoor in 2012
- Born: 6 August 1971 (age 54); India
- Other name: Gattu Kapoor
- Occupations: Film director; producer; former actor; writer
- Known for: Rock On!! (2008); Kai Po Che (2013); Fitoor (2016); Kedarnath (2018); Chandigarh Kare Aashiqui (2021)
- Spouse: Pragya Yadav (m. 2015)
- Children: 2
- Relatives: Jeetendra (uncle); Ekta Kapoor (cousin); Tusshar Kapoor (cousin)

Abhishek Kapoor (born 6 August 1971) is an Indian film director, former actor, writer and producer who works in Hindi cinema. He is known for his work in the musical drama Rock On!! (2008), the buddy sports drama Kai Po Che! (2013), the musical romantic drama Fitoor (2016), the romantic disaster film Kedarnath (2018) and the social romantic drama Chandigarh Kare Aashiqui (2021), earning nominations for the Filmfare Award for Best Director for Rock On!! and Kai Po Che!.

== Career ==
=== Initial acting work and directorial debut (1996–2006) ===
He started his career as an actor in 1996 with the films Aashique Mastane, opposite Monica Bedi, directed by Ajay Kashyap and Uff! Yeh Mohabbat, opposite Twinkle Khanna, directed by Vipin Handa. Both films emerged as critical and commercial disasters.

He made his directorial debut with the sports drama Aryan (2006) starring Sohail Khan and Sneha Ullal in lead roles, which emerged as a critical and commercial disaster.

=== Breakthrough, success and career fluctuations (2008–16) ===
In 2008, Kapoor achieved his breakthrough when he wrote and directed the musical drama Rock On!! starring debutants Farhan Akhtar and Prachi Desai alongside Arjun Rampal in lead roles. The film opened to positive reviews from critics upon release, with praise for its novel concept, screenplay, soundtrack and performances of the cast; however, it emerged as an average commercial success at the box office. Rock On!! won Kapoor the National Film Award for Best Feature Film in Hindi and the Filmfare Award for Best Story, in addition to nominations for the Filmfare Award for Best Film, Best Director and Best Screenplay.

In 2013, he screenwrote and directed the buddy sports drama Kai Po Che! (2013), starring Sushant Singh Rajput, Rajkummar Rao, Amit Sadh and Amrita Puri in lead roles. The film, based on Chetan Bhagat's novel, The 3 Mistakes of My Life (2008), had its world premiere at the 63rd Berlin International Film Festival's World Panorama segment. It opened to positive reviews from critics, with praise for its direction, screenplay and performances of the cast, in addition to emerging as an above-average commercial success at the box-office. Kai Po Che! won Kapoor the Filmfare Award for Best Screenplay, in addition to his second nomination for the Filmfare Award for Best Director.

In 2016, he directed and produced the musical romantic drama Fitoor, an adaptation of Charles Dickens's Great Expectations (1861). The film, starring Tabu, Katrina Kaif and Aditya Roy Kapur, opened to mixed-to-positive reviews from critics, with high praise for its soundtrack, cinematography, production design, costumes and performances of the cast, with Tabu's performance receiving widespread critical acclaim; however, its screenplay and pacing received criticism. However, it emerged as an underwhelming grosser at the box-office.

His next screenwriting venture that year was Rock On 2, the sequel to Rock On!!. Directed by Shujaat Saudagar, the film saw Akhtar, Desai and Rampal reprise their roles from the original film, with Shraddha Kapoor and Shashank Arora appearing in new roles. It opened to mixed-to-negative reviews from critics upon release, with its story, screenplay and soundtrack receiving sharp criticism. The film also emerged as a commercial disaster at the box-office.

=== Later career (2018–present) ===
In 2018, he helmed and wrote the romantic disaster drama Kedarnath starring Rajput alongside debutante Sara Ali Khan. The film, which followed an inter-faith love story amidst the backdrop of the 2013 North India floods, proved to be a commercial success at the box office and received positive reviews from critics upon release.

In 2021, he directed the social romantic drama Chandigarh Kare Aashiqui (2021), starring Ayushmann Khurrana and Vaani Kapoor, which narrated the story of a gym trainer who falls in love with a trans-woman. The film received positive reviews from critics and emerged as a moderate commercial success at the box office. It earned Kapoor his second Filmfare Award for Best Story.

Kapoor has launched his production company, Guy in the Sky Pictures.

== Personal life ==
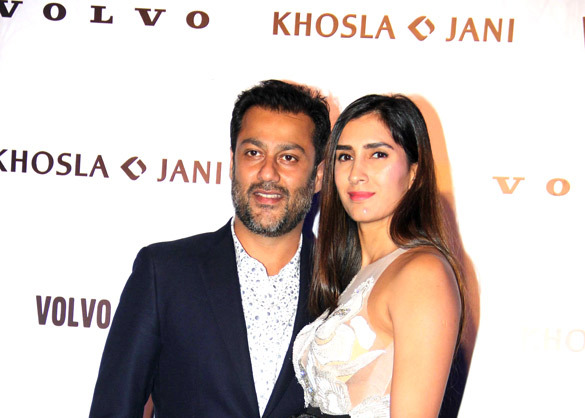
Kapoor and his wife Pragya Yadav at Abu Jani-Sandeep Khosla show for 'Volvo S90'

Kapoor is a cousin of the actor Tusshar Kapoor and producer Ekta Kapoor. His father Prasanna Kapoor is the brother of Bollywood actor Jeetendra.

On 4 May 2015, Abhishek married Swedish actress and model Pragya Yadav. They have two children, Isana and Shamsher.

== Filmography ==
Year	Title	Director	Writer	Producer
2006	Aryan	Yes	Yes	No
2008	Rock On!!	Yes	Yes	No
2013	Kai Po Che	Yes	Yes	No
2016	Fitoor	Yes	Yes	Yes
2016	Rock On 2	No	Yes	No
2018	Kedarnath	Yes	Yes	No
2021	Chandigarh Kare Aashiqui	Yes	Yes	Yes
2025	Azaad	Yes	Yes	Yes

Acting credits

Year	Title	Role	Notes
1995	Aashique Mastane	Mohan Prasad	
1997	Uff! Yeh Mohabbat	Raja	
2000	Shikaar	Vikram "Vicky" Nath	
2011	Game	Film director	Cameo

== Awards and nominations ==
=== National Film Awards ===
Year	Category	Work	Result	Ref.
2010	Best Feature Film in Hindi	Rock On!!	Won	

=== Filmfare Awards ===
Year	Category	Work	Result	Ref.
2009	Best Story	Rock On!!	Won	
2009	Best Film	Rock On!!	Nominated	
2009	Best Screenplay	Rock On!!	Nominated	
2009	Best Director	Rock On!!	Nominated	
2014	Best Director	Kai Po Che!	Nominated	
2014	Best Screenplay	Kai Po Che!	Won	
2022	Best Story	Chandigarh Kare Aashiqui	Won	

=== IIFA Awards ===
Year	Category	Work	Result	Ref.
2009	Best Director	Rock On!!	Nominated	
2014	Best Director	Kai Po Che!	Nominated	
2014	Best Story	Kai Po Che!	Nominated	

=== Screen Awards ===
Year	Category	Work	Result	Ref.
2009	Best Director	Rock On!!	Nominated	
2014	Best Director	Kai Po Che!	Nominated	
