= Trinetra Haldar Gummaraju =

Indian actress (born 1997)

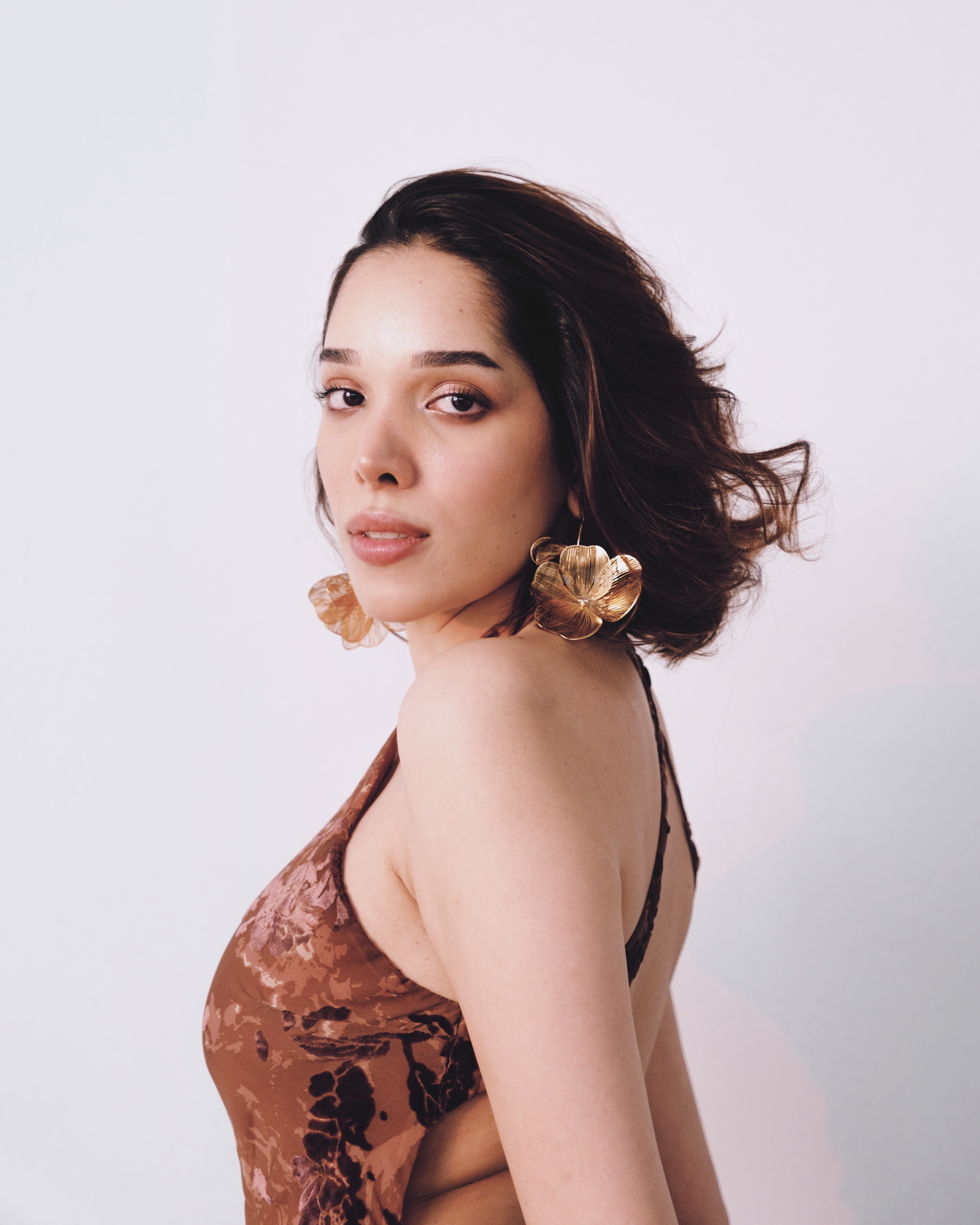
- Trinetra Haldar Gummaraju in 2024
- Born: 17 June 1997 (age 29); Bangalore, Karnataka, India
- Education: Kasturba Medical College, Manipal
- Occupations: Actress; Medical Doctor; Content Creator
- Years active: 2023–present

Trinetra Haldar Gummaraju (born 17 June 1997) also known mononymously as Trinetra, is an Indian actress and medical doctor known for her pioneering work in the Indian OTT and content-creation space. She began her career as a primary care physician, documenting her gender transition and life in medicine on social media platforms, garnering significant attention. This allowed her to pivot to acting, and she made her debut with Made in Heaven Season 2, an Indian web-series that premiered on Amazon Prime Video on 10 August 2023.

== Early life ==
Trinetra Haldar Gummaraju was born on 17 June 1997 in Bangalore, Karnataka to a Telugu father and a Bengali mother. She was assigned male at birth. Her schooling took place in Hyderabad and then in Bangalore. Her father Suresh Gummaraju is an engineer, mother Haima Haldar is an architect, and younger brother Agastya Gummaraju is a Computer Science engineer. Gummaraju completed M.B.B.S. in 2021 and her medical internship in 2023. Her acting debut in Amazon Prime Original - Made in Heaven 2 and Docu-Series Rainbow Rishta were shot during her medical internship. She experienced gender dysphoria through her childhood and adolescence, and began presenting as female during college, leading to significant challenges in the medical education ecosystem. She came out in 2018 as a transgender woman and changed her first name to Trinetra. She went through sex reassignment surgery in 2019 in Bangkok, Thailand. She reportedly underwent facial feminisation surgery in Spain in April, 2024.

== Career ==
Trinetra Haldar Gummaraju is a primary care physician and received her M.B.B.S. degree from Kasturba Medical College, Manipal. She received a government seat in 2015 via the Karnataka Common Entrance Test (CET), wherein her rank was 163. She is reportedly Karnataka's first transgender doctor. After coming out, her content focused on mainstream representation of LGBTQIA+ people and raised awareness around transgender rights. Her work has highlighted the lack of queer-inclusive information in medical education and transphobia in medical curricula and colleges across India.

She began her acting career with the Amazon Prime Original - Made in Heaven Season 2, where she played the role of Meher Chaudhry, a wedding planner, becoming the first trans woman to play a main character in an Indian web series.

Gummaraju went on to star in GLAAD Media Awards nominated Docu-Series Rainbow Rishta on Amazon Prime Video. She then appeared in SonyLiv Original Kankhajura as Aimee, starring opposite Roshan Mathew.

In 2022, she was listed in Forbes 30 Under 30 - India as well as Forbes 30 Under 30 Asia - Media, Marketing & Advertising. She was on the Forbes Top 100 Digital Stars Lists in 2022 and 2023. She was enlisted under the GQ 25 Most Influential Young Indians List in 2021 and GQ 30 Most Influential Young Indians List in 2022. She has featured on the covers of magazines like Harper's Bazaar, Forbes India, Femina and Elle India.

== Activism ==
Trinetra Haldar Gummaraju is one of India's first transgender people to digitally document her medico-socio-legal transition from male to female. She documented her surgical processes and recovery on YouTube through a series of vlogs. Her work has documented the lack of queer-inclusive medical education in India and the state of trans rights in the country.

Given the lack of queer and trans affirming healthcare in India, Haldar Gummaraju created a crowdsourced list of LGBTQIA+ friendly doctors in India called The Rainbow Pill List, accessible on her Instagram bio. It contains over 200 entries.

In Madras High Court case of S Sushma v. Commissioner of Police, Justice N Anand Venkatesh sought to educate himself on LGBTQIA+ issues. Trinetra Gummaraju was among those from the community he consulted to seek information. He stated that Vidya Dinakaran, a psychotherapist, and Trinetra Gummaraju became his "gurus" and "pulled (him) out of darkness." In a report filed to the court by Trinetra Gummaraju, she elaborated on the need for queer inclusive medical education and for archaic and outdated queerphobic texts to be removed and spoke of the rampant practice of conversion therapy, whereby medical practitioners claim and attempt to "cure" LGBTQIA+ identities via unscientific and unethical means. Justice Venkatesh passed a series of orders, eventually directing the National Medical Commission to remove queerphobic information from medical curricula in India and to push for the banning of conversion therapy. "Medical practitioners who claim to be able to "cure" homosexuality should have their licenses revoked," he said. The National Medical Commission went on to deem conversion therapy "professional misconduct" and constituted a working committee to look into queer inclusive medical education.

Upon being denied a girls’ hostel in college despite having changed her legal documents, Trinetra Gummaraju via the Centre for Law and Policy Research, Bengaluru filed a Public Interest Litigation asking the Karnataka High Court to direct public and private institutions to create gender neutral accommodation for trans people, and house according to changed legal documents.

== Filmography ==
Year	Title	Role(s)	Language(s)	Notes	Ref.
2023	Made in Heaven	Meher Chaudhry	Hindi	Amazon Prime Video	
2025	Kankhajura	Aimee	Hindi	SonyLIV	
