= Nicolette Bird =

Indian actress and model (born 1985)

- Born: 14 August 1985 (age 40); Kolkata, West Bengal, India
- Other name: Neeko
- Occupations: Actress, Model
- Years active: 2003–2010
- Spouse: Ravi Mehta

Nicolette Bird (born 14 August 1985) is an Indian actress and model who has had roles in the Bollywood films Rock On!!, released in 2008, and Striker, released in early 2010. As a model, she has appeared in television commercials and magazine advertisements in India.

== Career ==
Bird has done many ad campaigns and music videos, and was seen in Rock On!! as Tanya. She was seen in the Amaan and Ayaan Ali Khan music video called "Pathway To The Unknown." She has done ads for Honda Shine, Garnier, Elle 18, Maruti Swift, Doy Care, and has featured in an item song in the Telugu movie Boss, I Love You. Her next movie was Striker (2010), a Hindi film in which she played Noori, a conservative Muslim.

== Filmography ==
Year	Film	Role	Language	Notes
2003	UMI 10 Vol.4		Hindi	White Dancer, Song was Saiyan Dil Mein Aana Re
2006	Boss, I Love You		Telugu	Special appearance
2008	Rock On!!	Tanya	Hindi	
2009	Hatrick Hodi Maga	Suma	Kannada	
2010	Striker	Noorie	Hindi	

== Personal life ==
Bird is a daughter of Edwina Bird and Nicholas Bird of Calcutta. Her father, who is retired, was a jockey in India. Her mother is a consultant in Calcutta for Databazaar.com, an office supply company based in Miramar, Florida.

Nicolette Bird was introduced to her spouse, Ravi Mehta, by a mutual friend at a Mumbai hotel in February 2008. He was on a business trip and was about to return to the United States. Mehta, who was born in Colorado and grew up in Japan, went to Mumbai every couple of months on business; they began seeing each other.
