= Hatrick Hodi Maga =

- Poster
- Directed by: P. N. Satya
- Written by: P. N. Satya
- Produced by: K V Rama Rao; V S Rajkumar
- Starring: Shiva Rajkumar; Nicolette Bird; Manju Bhargavi
- Cinematography: P. L. Ravi
- Edited by: M. Varman
- Music by: Jassie Gift
- Production company: RRR Creations
- Release date: 8 May 2009
- Running time: 137 minutes
- Country: India
- Language: Kannada

Hatrick Hodi Maga (transl. Hit a hat-trick son) is a 2009 Indian Kannada action crime film directed and written by P. N. Satya. The film stars Shiva Rajkumar and Nicolette Bird. The film has musical score composed by Jassie Gift.

== Plot ==
A well educated man is thrown into a turbulent life of crime and violence for survival after getting into a tussle with two gangs.

== Cast ==
- Shiva Rajkumar as Surya
- Nicolette Bird as Suma
- Manju Bhargavi
- Sadhu Kokila
- Sharath Lohitashwa as Kapali
- H. G. Dattatreya as Narasimhaiah
- Thilak Shekar
- Adi Lokesh
- Pavitra Lokesh as Durgi
- Mohan Juneja
- B. Jaya

== Soundtrack ==
The music of the film was composed by Jassie Gift.

Track listing
No.	Title	Lyrics	Singer(s)	Length
1.	"Eno Heluthide"	Kaviraj	Kunal Ganjawala, Ku. Lakshmi	04:20
2.	"Bisi Bisi Hudugi"	K. Kalyan	Anuradha Sriram	05:02
3.	"Ee Beauty Bhoomili"	Ram Narayan	Mathangi	05:50
4.	"Belliya Theralli"	K. Kalyan	Madhu Balakrishnan, Rajalakshmy, Kushal	04:23
5.	"Duniya Ninde"	K. Kalyan	Chetan Sosca, Jassie Gift	05:16

== Reception ==
A critic from The Times of India scored the film at 3 out of 5 stars and says "It is Shivrajkumar's show all through. Sharath Lohithashwa is brilliant. Manju Bhargavi is graceful. Music by Jessie Gift and camerawork by Ravi are good". R G Vijayasarathy of Rediff.com scored the film at 1 out of 5 stars and wrote "As usual Shivaraj Kumar is good in the fight sequences and dances. Despite his age, he shows extreme agility on screen. Mumbai import Nicolette Bird has an insignificant role that is limited to a few songs and some scenes. You pity actors of great calibre like Sharath Lohithaswa, Pavithra Lokesh and Aadi Lokesh whose roles are so badly written. Jassie Gift who did well in his debut Kannada film Hudugaata, is completely off colour here".

A critic from The New Indian Express wrote "Surprisingly, Malayalam music director Jessie Gift, who gave some wonderful tunes in his first Kannada film "Hudugaata", fails to deliver good compositions here. "Hatrick Hodi Maga" is an ordinary fare with a slow pace of narration". A critic from Mid-Day wrote "Shivarjkumar and Manju Bharagavi have given a good performance. The music and songs in the movie also needs a special mention. Nicolette Bird has no proper platform to show her talent and Sadhu Kokila's rubbish comedy irritates the audience". A critic from Bangalore Mirror wrote "Sadhu Kokila's comedy is a humorous take on 'Jogi, and it is plain silly. Most of the characters are dull and the film never rises above the ordinary. Hodimaga is just another addition to the 'long' list of such films for Shiva Rajkumar".
