= Kedarnath (film) =

2018 Indian film by Abhishek Kapoor

- Theatrical release poster
- Directed by: Abhishek Kapoor
- Written by: Kanika Dhillon; Abhishek Kapoor
- Produced by: Ronnie Screwvala; Pragya Kapoor; Abhishek Kapoor
- Starring: Sushant Singh Rajput; Sara Ali Khan
- Cinematography: Tushar Kanti Ray
- Edited by: Chandan Arora
- Music by: Score: Hitesh Sonik; Songs: Amit Trivedi
- Production companies: RSVP Movies; Guy in the Sky Pictures
- Distributed by: RSVP Movies
- Release date: 7 December 2018
- Running time: 116 minutes
- Country: India
- Language: Hindi
- Budget: ₹68 crore (Note: contains print and advertising costs)
- Box office: est.₹102.77 crore

Kedarnath is a 2018 Indian Hindi-language romantic disaster film written and directed by Abhishek Kapoor. Featuring Sushant Singh Rajput and newcomer Sara Ali Khan in lead roles, it tells an inter-faith love story between a wealthy Hindu Brahmin girl whose family owns a lodge and shops near the historic Kedarnath Temple in the Uttarakhand mountains and a Muslim boy who is a 'pithoo' (porter) working in the same vicinity. As their relationship grows closer, the pair face many obstacles, including familial disapproval and contrasting backgrounds; when the sudden rains of the 2013 Uttarakhand floods devastate the region, the couple are forced to survive against the elements and face the ultimate test of their love.

The film is produced by Ronnie Screwvala of RSVP Movies in his comeback feature film venture, and by Pragya Kapoor under Guy in the Sky Pictures, with Kanika Dhillon as a co-writer. The film's production began in June 2017, and principal photography commenced on 5 September 2017. The film released on 7 December 2018 to mixed reviews with praise for Rajput's and Khan's performances, cinematography, music and storyline but criticism for its VFX, screenplay and overall execution. The film was a moderate commercial success.

== Plot ==
Based in the valley around the Kedarnath Temple in 2013, Mansoor Khan is a local Muslim porter. Mandakini "Mukku" Mishra is the younger daughter of Hindu priest Brijraj who runs a hotel for pilgrims by the temple on behalf of the temple committee. She is engaged to the nephew of the head priest, Kullu. He was meant to marry her older sister, Brinda "Bindu". They both were engaged during childhood but he dumped her and chose her sister Mukku who turned out to be prettier, and Brijraj agreed. Out of rebellion, Mukku flirts with the local boys and convinces them to come to her house and propose in order to embarrass Brijraj and Kullu. Mansoor and Mukku both notice each other and then Mukku makes the first move and hires him as her regular porter as she goes from her family home to a neighbouring village to help at her uncle's shop. She talks continuously and flirts outrageously and finally gets enough of a reaction to know he feels the same way. They are trapped in the rain together, share stories of their childhood, and then share a kiss. Brinda, incensed by jealousy, tells Mansoor that Mukku is just flirting with him as she has flirted with all the other boys. Mukku is unable to defend herself when he confronts her, but starts following him around everywhere, finally sitting in the rain outside his house. Brinda tries to cover for her, but she is found out and both Brijraj and Kullu come for her, planning to throw out all the Muslims, which, not-so-coincidentally, will also open up space for the new luxury hotel they are planning.

Mukku is taken home by her family who move up her wedding. Nevertheless, she keeps insisting that Mansoor will come for her. Mansoor comes, but is spotted and beaten brutally by Kullu and his men. However, his friend pleads to save him and carries an unconscious Mansoor back to his home. While the porter community prepares to leave the valley, Mansoor decides not to leave without Mukku.

Mukku is married to Kullu and she slits her wrist attempting suicide, but is saved by her family; Kullu taunts Mansoor with the news. Mansoor runs to Mukku and promises he will come back for her that night when she is recovered, so they can leave the valley together. Kullu plans to take his band of priests and kill Mansoor and drive out all the Muslims. All of a sudden it rains and the floods begin. Mansoor sends his mother Ameena with the other porters into the mountains and runs towards Mukku. She and her family are trying to gather the guests of their hotel on the top floor, whilst Kullu and his mother arrive driven in by the storm and Mukku refuses to go to him. Suddenly the floor caves in as Brinda and the sisters' mother Lata are swept away along with many others. Mukku, Brijraj and a few others make their way to the temple, where Mansoor finds them just as the water sweeps down. He grabs her hand in the flood, and Brijraj holds on to her and all three are saved. After the water goes down, they make their way to a house that is still standing and wave at an Indian Army helicopter that is coming to save them. Mansoor sends up the woman and child who are with them first, then Brijraj and finally Mukku. As he and the father of the child finally prepare to climb in, there is space for only one person in the chopper. Mansoor sacrifices himself and sends the father of the child instead. Mukku screams as she helplessly watches Mansoor die as the ground below him crumbles into the raging river. Three years later, in the winter, as the presiding idol of the Kedarnath Temple returns from the Ukhimath Temple, Mukku is seen still living with Brijraj and running the lodge, listening to Mansoor's favourite song on the radio which she dedicated to him and she smiles.

== Cast ==
- Sushant Singh Rajput as Mansoor Khan, Mukku's love interest and Ameena's son
  - Aarav Malhotra as Young Mansoor Khan
- Sara Ali Khan as Mandakini "Mukku" Mishra Tripathi, Mansoor's love interest and Kullu's wife and Brinda's younger sister
- Nitish Bharadwaj as Brijraj Mishra, Mukku and Brinda's father
- Nishant Dahiya as Kamal "Kullu" Tripathi, Mukku's fiancé and later husband and the main antagonist
- Alka Amin as Ameena Khan, Mansoor's mother
- Sonali Sachdev as Lata Mishra, Mukku and Brinda's mother
- Pooja Gor as Brinda "Bindu" Mishra, Mukku's elder sister
- Mir Sarwar as Bashir
- Sunita Rajwar as Daddo
- Arun Bali as Chief Priest of Kedarnath Temple
- Faiz Khan as Hemchand
- Sharad Vyas as Himalaya Tyagi
- Priyadarshan as Tarang
- Hitesh Bhardwaj as Helicopter Co-Pilot
- Lalu Makhija as Uncle at party
- Shahab Ali as Rashid Khan, Mansoor's father (shown in a flashback)
- Sheikh Maidul as Mansoor's friend (Porter)

== Production ==
The film's principal photography began on 5 September 2017. The first motion poster of the film released on 19 August 2017. The first look of Sara Ali Khan came out on 8 October 2017. Rajput completed filming his portion on 16 June 2018.

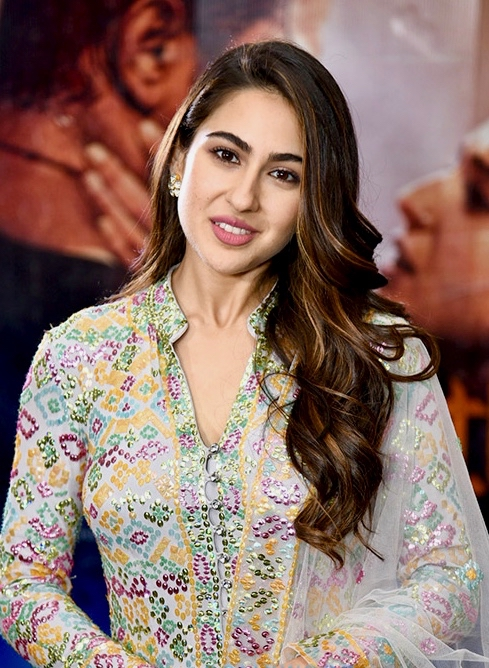
Sara Ali Khan Pataudi promoting Kedarnath in 2018

In February 2018, a dispute between director Abhishek Kapoor and the producers KriArj Entertainment led to a lawsuit that threatened the completion of production. The producers later clarified their intent to continue production. An ensuing court case led KriArj to drop out of the film's production entirely when Ronnie Screwvala's RSVP Movies opted to take over. The legal battle brought about some confusion for the shooting schedule of lead actress Sara Ali Khan,daughter of actors Amrita Singh and Saif Ali Khan, as she was simultaneously shooting for her second film Simmba with Ranveer Singh. Due to having free days as per the Kedarnath producers' court case, Khan allotted those days to film with the Simmba crew; this decision was unacceptable to Kedarnath's director Kapoor who took Khan to court. The two eventually settled out of court as Khan agreed to split her time between both films. The case also had an effect on the release of the film as the producers ended up losing several lucrative prospective release slots near the end of the year. It seemed the film would be releasing in 2019 and that Rohit Shetty-directed Simmba would be Sara Ali Khan's debut film. However, when the producers of Ajay Devgn-starrer Total Dhamaal relinquished their 7 December release date in favour of late February 2019, RSVP Movies was quick to secure it for Kedarnath.

In November 2018, priests of Kedarnath demanded a ban on the film as they believed it promotes love jihad. A BJP leader, Ajendra Ajay of Dehradun's BJP media relations team, also took issue and urged a ban; he wrote to the Central Board of Film Certification (CBFC) asserting that the film makes fun of Hindu sentiments despite being set against the backdrop of the Uttarakhand floods. Speaking at the trailer launch of the film, producer Ronnie Screwvala addressed concerns by stating that he believed there was "nothing offensive in the film," and that he would be "happy to talk" about objections once the Censor Board themselves have seen the film. Director Abhishek Kapoor concurred, urging people to watch the film itself and not judge based on the teaser.

In December 2018, two lawyers from Andheri filed a complaint to the Mumbai police and the Films Division of Mumbai, requesting the film not to be released. They claimed that it promotes 'love jihad', and stated that the film's producers "cooked up an imaginary love story," and warned that should the film release, it would "give birth to grave chaos and anarchy in the whole country and certainly cause huge destruction everywhere." On 6 December, the day before the film's release, the Bombay High Court dismissed the lawyers' plea that the film hurt religious sentiments and "lowered the dignity of the eponymous deity," and allowed the film to be released as planned. In an interview with the Mumbai Mirror, Sara Ali Khan denied that the film promoted 'love jihad,' stating that the film was "really not that kind of a film, rather it's about how Kedarnath is as much Mansoor's world as it's Mukku's. I don't understand this kind of divisiveness...just as everyone doesn't have to like every movie, we can coexist with different world views."

On 5 December 2018, a PIL (Public interest litigation) filed by Prakash Rajput, head of the IHS religious society, was met with disapproval from the High Court of Gujarat. Rajput asserted that the film hurt Hindu sentiments by portraying Muslim-Hindu love, and that it had a kissing scene, which was not appropriate for family audiences. The court questioned him thoroughly before eventually dismissing his complaints as "a publicity stunt" and fining him Rs. 5,000.

== Marketing and release ==
The film was scheduled for release in June 2018, but was postponed to 7 December 2018. An official poster of film was released on 29 October 2018; the following day, 30 October, a teaser was released. The official trailer and theatrical release poster were released on 12 November 2018. On 5 November 2018, the first song and music video from the film was released, titled "Namo Namo," a devotional song composed by Amitabh Bhattacharya and sung by Amit Trivedi, portrayed on Sushant Singh Rajput's character Mansoor, introducing him as a "jolly yet hardworking pithoo" (porter), who cares for his customers on their pilgrimage around the Kedarnath area.

On 12 November 2018, lead actors Rajput and Khan started promotions of the film by appearing on the Reality TV competition show Indian Idol 10. On 15 November 2018, the film's second song was released on YouTube: "Sweetheart." Written by Amitabh Bhattacharya, composed by Amit Trivedi, and sung by Dev Negi, the song is a "foot-tapping number" picturized on the lead pair as they dance enthusiastically to a stirring dhol beat. A mehendi/sangeet ceremony is in the backdrop of the song and hints at the developing relationship between the two. On 20 November 2018, a third song was released, "Qaafirana," depicting the lead couple's budding romance on their journey through the Kedarnath hills. It was composed by Amit Trivedi, and sung by Arijit Singh and Nikhita Gandhi.

On 24 November, a short dialogue promo of the film was released, titled "Panditji Senti Hogaye." It depicts Mukku as a "free-spirited woman" who doesn't want to be confined to household chores and running her parents' hotel. She is in conflict with her dad, whom she calls "Panditji," and dreams of going off on her own.

On 27 November 2018, lead actors Rajput and Khan promoted the film on the Reality TV singing competition show Sa Re Ga Ma Pa. On 28 November 2018, the film's fourth song, "Jaan 'Nisaar," was released. A love ballad sung in both male and female versions by Arijit Singh and Asees Kaur respectively, written by Amitabh Bhattacharya and composed by Amit Trivedi, the song depicts the caste-based conflict and heartbreak the couple eventually go through in their relationship.South Africa.

On 2 December, a second short dialogue video was uploaded, "Aadat daal lo", which depicts Mukku's wit against Mansoor's flirtatious insults, and eventually her romantic inclination towards him. On 4 December, another short dialogue was released, titled "Koshish Ki Hai Kabhi" which reveals the ensuing romantic banter between Mukku and Mansoor as they journey through the mountains. On 5 December, two days before the film's release, the producers held a special screening for Bollywood personalities.

== Soundtrack ==
Kedarnath

Soundtrack album by Amit Trivedi
- Released: 27 November 2018
- Recorded: 2018
- Genre: Feature film soundtrack
- Length: 22:36
- Language: Hindi
- Label: Zee Music Company
- Producer: Amit Trivedi

Amit Trivedi chronology
Helicopter Eela (2018)	Kedarnath (2018)	India's Most Wanted (2019)
External audio
- Audio Jukebox on YouTube

The songs of the film are composed by Amit Trivedi while lyrics are written by Amitabh Bhattacharya.

Track listing
No.	Title	Singer(s)	Length
1.	"Namo Namo"	Amit Trivedi	5:22
2.	"Sweetheart"	Dev Negi	3:32
3.	"Qaafirana"	Arijit Singh, Nikhita Gandhi	5:42
4.	"Jaan 'Nisaar" (Version 1)	Arijit Singh	3:58
5.	"Jaan 'Nisaar" (Version 2)	Asees Kaur	4:02
Total length:			22:36

== Reception ==
=== Critical response ===
Kedarnath released to mixed reviews from critics. While most of them highly praised Sara Ali Khan's debut performance, and acclaimed the visuals, they summarized the plot as "predictable" and "worn out."

Rachit Gupta of the Times of India gave the film 3 out of 5 stars, called it "an all-too-familiar love story" yet praised the debut performance of Sara Ali Khan, calling her a "live wire," and commending her on-screen charisma and confidence, saying that she reminds audiences of "a young and boisterous Amrita Singh (her mother) in films like Betaab and Chameli Ki Shaadi." Sushant Singh Rajput gives a commendable support to Khan, but doesn't do much heavy lifting. While the film suffered from a slow pace, its climax and CGI buildup strongly helped the narrative. He noted no truly memorable songs save for "Namo Namo," but stated that the setting of the film helped keep the film fresh, along with Khan.

Ruchika Kher of Times Now News gave the film 3.5 out of 5 stars, saying that the film has all the ingredients of a hit film: "a fresh face (a star kid at that), an inter-faith love story, the backdrop of a real-life tragedy, and good performances." She commended the chemistry between the two leads, saying that much of their romantic interplay can "bring a smile to your face." Like other reviewers, she highly praised Sara Ali Khan, calling her "brilliant" and "a breath of fresh air," noting that she gave a stellar performance in the climax. She also praised Rajput's nuanced performance, "effortlessly mixing restraint and aggression as required." She admired Kapoor's direction and the film's songs as well, yet was critical of certain tonal inconsistencies in scenes where Rajput's character is attacked, and when Khan's family finds out about the romance. Overall, she called it a respectable debut film for Sara Ali Khan.

Meena Ayer of DNA India gave the film 3 out of 5 stars. She highly praised Khan, calling her an "a superstar on the rise...extraordinarily-talented star kid," finding it "hard to believe that this is her first film because she is so spectacular," noting that director Abhishek Kapoor "does full justice to her." Rajput was a "talented actor" who "is game to complement her without displaying any ego." She criticized the predictability of the love story, saying that "the conflict is there, but it is not enough to evoke more than a certain degree of emotion." In the second half of the film's disaster scenes, she praised Abhishek Kapoor for being "a sensitive director" who "stayed true to the story," yet noted that the disaster scenes seem a bit "disturbing" and take up so much time that "a pall of gloom descends on the audience." Yet she ultimately called it a worthy watch for Sara Ali Khan.

Shubra Gupta of The Indian Express gave the film 2 out of 5 stars, calling the film a "weepie without the tears." Like Rachit Gupta, she also noted the similarity of debutante Sara Ali Khan to her mother, showing a "perky confidence." Sushant Singh Rajput was on average form, and while supporting actors Nishant Dahiya, Pooja Gor, and Alka Amin made an impact, Nitish Bharadwaj "as the angry ‘door-ho-jaao-meri-nazaron-se-baap’ is old, old hat." She was more critical of the structure of the film, saying that the "writing is sketchy, and the tone confused, never quite knowing whether to go quiet and life-like or to swell with wailing violins."

Kunal Guha of the Mumbai Mirror have the film 2.5 out of 5 stars, praising the cinematography's well-defined landscaping, Sara Ali Khan's performance, and the song "Namo Namo." He criticized the direction of Kapoor, Rajput's performance (calling it "struggling"), and the "ghisa-pita formula." He said that Khan "shines" and that "she often conveys it through her eyes alone – giving us a taste of the diverse faces she can throw on." He was critical of the film's flow and tonality as a whole, saying it "seems like watching an '80s Hindi movie for an hour-and-a-half and then an '80s shark movie for another 10 minutes."

Manjusha Radhakrishnan of Gulf News gave the film 2.5 out of 5 stars, saying that the film is "perfectly stormy and is good for a one-time watch." She noted that the brisk pace makes up for the lack of emotional investment in the lead character, and called Rajput "as earnest as they come in attempting to play Mansoor." She praised Sara Ali Khan, calling her "a natural," and that while she has rawness in a few emotional scenes, she "has a commanding screen presence." She called the film as one that evidently "belongs to Khan as all forces are at work to display her range as an actor." She said that the chemistry between the two leads worked well in the first half, but unraveled into melodrama in the second. She criticized the "archaic" antagonists, the fiancé figure (Tarun Gahlot) and the father (Nitish Bharadwaj); she also noted how the second-half wedding feels undeserved. Yet she praised the visual effects of the natural disaster, saying that they "rattle you" and "makes you believe that a natural disaster is the biggest leveller in life."

== Box office ==
Kedarnath earned ₹6.85 crore on first day of opening from its India shows. In first weekend of opening, domestic earning was ₹27 crore. The first week domestic earning of the film was ₹40.85 crore. The film grossed ₹88.79 crore in domestic market and ₹11.36 crore in overseas market, taking worldwide gross to ₹102.77 crore.
