= Kankhajura =

- Genre: Crime; Drama
- Based on: Magpie by Adam Bizanski and Omri Shenhar
- Story by: Chandan Arora; Upendra Sidhaye
- Directed by: Chandan Arora
- Starring: Roshan Mathew; Mohit Raina; Sarah Jane Dias; Trinetra Haldar Gummaraju
- Country of origin: India
- Original language: Hindi
- No. of episodes: 8

Production
- Executive producer: Sameer Khurana
- Producer: Ajay Rai
- Cinematography: Rajeev Ravi; Vinod Illampally
- Editor: Vaishak Ravi
- Production company: Jar Pictures

Original release
- Network: SonyLIV
- Release: 30 May 2025

Kankhajura is a 2025 Hindi-language Indian crime thriller web series streaming on SonyLIV. It is directed by Chandan Arora and produced by Ajay Rai.

It stars Roshan Mathew, Mohit Raina, Trinetra Haldar Gummaraju and Sarah Jane Dias and the series is released on 30 May 2025. It's an official adaptation of the Israeli TV series Magpie by Adam Bizanski and Omri Shenhar.

== Plot ==
After serving 14 years for a crime from his youth, Ashu returns to reconnect with his brother Max. As they struggle to rebuild trust, Ashu's dark past and dangerous connections resurface, threatening Max's life and business. A gripping story of family, redemption, and the shadows that never truly fade.

== Cast ==
- Roshan Mathew as Ashu
- Mohit Raina as Max
- Sarah Jane Dias as Nisha
- Trinetra Haldar as Aimee
- Ninad Kamat As Pedro
- Mahesh Shetty As Shardul
- Heeba Shah As DSP Leena Naik
- Usha Nadkarni As Mrs. Deshmukh

== Release ==
Kankhajura was released on 30 May 2025. The official trailer was unveiled on 21 May 2025.

== Reception ==
Shubhra Gupta of The Indian Express gave 2.5 stars out of 5 and said that " While the show is filled with good performances -- everyone does their job well -- the writing doesn’t surprise as much as it could have. There’s also the standard difficulty of everything becoming a stretch." Abhimanyu Mathur of Hindustan Times gave 4 stars out of 5 and writes that "Kankhajura is anything but lazy. It is original, too, marrying the essence of Magpie with the soul of Goa and the heart of desi storytelling. This show proves that if done right, even a remake can be one of the best shows of the year." Archika Khurana of The Times of India rated 3.5/5 stars and observes that "Kankhajura may not be an edge-of-your-seat thriller, but it is a thoughtful, character-driven drama with enough intrigue and depth to keep you invested across its eight episodes."

Deepa Gahlot writing for Scroll.in commented that "Roshan Mathew correctly tempers Ashu’s evil with a vulnerability that would have been touching if the consequences of his actions had been less destructive. Mohit Raina starts with a stylish confidence that turns to bafflement and then desperation, and he carries off the role well." Sana Farzeen of India Today gave 3 stars out of 5 and said that " 'Kankhajura' is a psychological thriller that explores family tension and emotional manipulation. Despite strong performances, the series falters with a rushed and less impactful ending." Vinamra Mathur of Firstpost rated 2.5/5 stars and said that "Kankhajura swings between pulsating and predictable. The performances are impressive but at times you end up being one step ahead of the people who try their best to deceive your wits. It even has a tinge of humour and happens to be a harmless watch."

Mayur Sanap of Rediff.com rated 2/5 stars and said that "Kankhajura could have been so much better given its initial promise." Rahul Desai of The Hollywood Reporter India commented that "The eight-episode drama lacks the craft to pull off a compelling premise." Subhash K Jha writing for News 24 gave 3.5 stars out of 5 and said that "Kankhajura has its dosage of deficits. Some of the action in the closing episodes looks stagey and tacky, and one involving gas cylinders is an embarrassment. But with Roshan Mathew’s OTT-defining performance—yes, we have not seen anything like this on any streamer–the series holds together very ably. As far as slow burn crime dramas go, this one scorches."
