= Unconditional (TV series) =

2026 Israeli drama

- Genre: Thriller, Drama
- Created by: Adam Bizanski; Dana Idisis
- Written by: Adam Bizanski
- Directed by: Johnathan Gurfinkel
- Starring: Liraz Chamami, Talia Lynne Ronn, Jenya Dodina
- Original languages: Hebrew, English, Russian

Production
- Running time: 45 minutes
- Production company: Keshet International

Original release
- Network: Apple TV
- Release: 8 May 2026 – present

Unconditional is an Israeli drama television series created by Adam Bizanski and Dana Idisis, and written by Bizanski. It stars Liraz Chamami, Talia Lynne Ronn, Amir Haddad, Yossi Marshek and Evgenia Dodina. The series premiered on Keshet 12 on April 27, 2026, and began streaming globally on Apple TV on May 8, 2026.

== Premise ==
After 23-year-old Gali (Talia Lynne Ronn) is imprisoned in Russia for drug smuggling, her mother Orna (Liraz Chamami) attempts to navigate a complex legal and political system to secure her release. To save her, Orna is forced to confront the reality of who her daughter actually is.

== Cast and characters ==
=== Main ===
- Liraz Chamami as Orna, a mother determined to free her daughter who was arrested in Russia. She begins as a shy and timid person but is forced out of her shell.
- Talia Lynne Ronn as Gali, Orna's 23-year-old daughter who turns out not to be as innocent as her mother believed.
- Evgenia Dodina as Rita.

=== Supporting ===
- Yossi Marshek as Benni, Gali's father who is dealing with early-onset dementia.
- Amir Haddad as Dori, Orna's ex, who leverages his background in the secret service to help Orna track down leads. He has romantic interest in Orna.
- Leib Levin as Roma.
- Vladimir Friedman as Mikhail.

== Inspiration ==
The show draws inspiration from Brittney Griner arrest in Russia, as well as the 2019 Naama Issaschar affair, when an Israeli citizen was arrested in Russia under drug smuggling charges.

== Reception ==
=== Critical response ===
The series has received a positive critical reception from reviewers. Alison Herman praised the series in a review for Variety as "an occasionally absurd — but absorbing and well-paced — tale of individuals in over their heads."

The series was also praised by Cristina Escobar for RogerEbert.com: "Showrunners Adam Bizanski and Dana Idisis build a compelling thriller here with surprising twists that build rather than simply redirect. With a muted palette and nerve-wracking score, “Unconditional” had my heart racing through action sequences and emotional revelations alike." Escobar concluded: "“Unconditional,” for all the surety in its title and main character’s motivation, is a series of haunting, thought-provoking questions, which is a lot more than most of its peers can boast."

Hannah Brown, writing for The Jerusalem Post was also positive, praising lead actress, Liraz Chamami: "The series is greatly enhanced by Chamami’s excellent performance as Orna. Orna is the perfect fit for the leading role, and she holds our interest and sympathy from the beginning. In a low-key way, the actress conveys the character’s utter panic and helplessness as she is forced to confront an uncaring, venal Russian prison system and judgmental, indifferent bureaucrats at home."

== Episodes ==
No.	Title	Directed by	Written by	Original release date
1	"Lucky Kid"	Johnathan Gurfinkel	Adam Bizanski	May 8, 2026
A mother-daughter vacation comes to an abrupt end when 23-year-old Gali is arrested at a Moscow airport on drug smuggling charges, plunging her mother Orna into an unthinkable legal nightmare.
2	"Everyone's Daughter"	Johnathan Gurfinkel	Adam Bizanski	May 8, 2026
Orna follows the trail of Gali's mysterious multiple passports and comes under intense pressure to abandon a crucial televised interview meant to bring public awareness to the case.
3	"The Wet Side"	Johnathan Gurfinkel	Adam Bizanski	May 15, 2026
As official diplomatic negotiations with Russia stall, Orna and her ex-partner Dori try tracking down an ex-special ops mercenary with secret ties to Gali's activities.
4	"Everybody's Sorry"	Johnathan Gurfinkel	Adam Bizanski	May 22, 2026
News of a potential prisoner exchange completely changes the stakes for Orna. Meanwhile, back at home, her husband Benni's health begins to rapidly deteriorate.
5	"Yuri Glaskov"	Johnathan Gurfinkel	Adam Bizanski	May 29, 2026
Orna and her new ally Rita travel to Moscow hoping to force Gali's release—only to uncover a darker truth.
6	"Smile Already"	Johnathan Gurfinkel	Adam Bizanski	June 5, 2026
Gali tries to broker a business deal with a dangerous man ahead of her mother-daughter trip.
7	"Back-Seat People"	Johnathan Gurfinkel	Adam Bizanski	June 12, 2026
8	"The Seed"	Johnathan Gurfinkel	Adam Bizanski	June 19, 2026
