= Adam Bizanski =

Television writer and creator

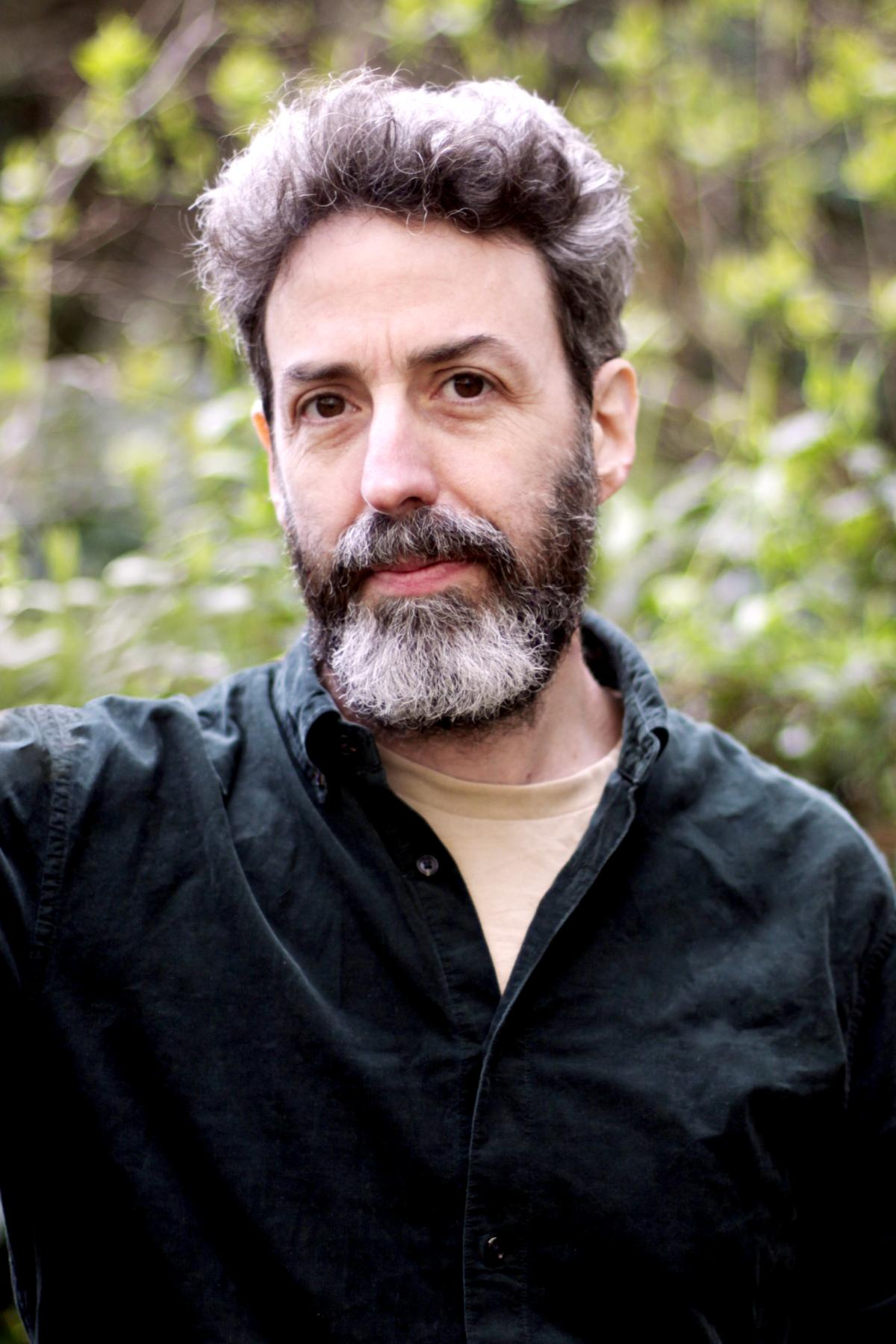
- Adam Bizanski, 2026
- Born: January 29, 1983 (age 43); Haifa, Israel
- Occupations: Writer, TV Creator, Director
- Years active: 2000–present
- Television: Unconditional, Magpie

Adam Bizanski (Hebrew: אדם ביזנסקי; born January 29, 1983) is an Israeli writer, creator and director based in Berlin, Germany. He is known for his work in music videos and scripted television.

He first gained recognition for his animation music videos, including work for artists such as The Shins, Wolf Parade, and Zero 7.

Bizanski co-created and wrote the Israeli drama series Magpie. He is the writer and co-creator of the Apple TV thriller Unconditional.

== Career ==
Bizanski began his career in animation and music videos, directing work for artists including Yoni Bloch, The Shins, Zero 7, and Wolf Parade. His 2005 video for the Shins' "Pink Bullets" was among the first music videos selected for sale through the iTunes Music Store when Apple introduced video downloads. He won the ASIF Award for Best Animated Music Video three years in a row, and his video for Wolf Parade won Best Animated Music Video at the 2006 Antville Music Video Awards's.

His music videos and short-form work were featured in publications including Res, IdN, Boards, Stereogum, Motionographer, Filmmaker, and It's Nice That, and were screened at festivals and exhibition venues. Some of this work also appeared on curated DVD releases, including Sub Pop's Acquired Taste.

In 2010, Bizanski launched the independent project Singalong Paul, centered on a papier-mâché puppet character lip-syncing to songs by bands including Foals, Guster, and The Black Keys. He later expanded the character into the 2012 short film Paul, which won the Silver Hugo at the Chicago International Film Festival.

In 2015, he created an audio documentary for the podcast Israel Story about the Badir brothers, three blind Israeli-Arab siblings involved in a major phone fraud case in Israel in the 1990s.

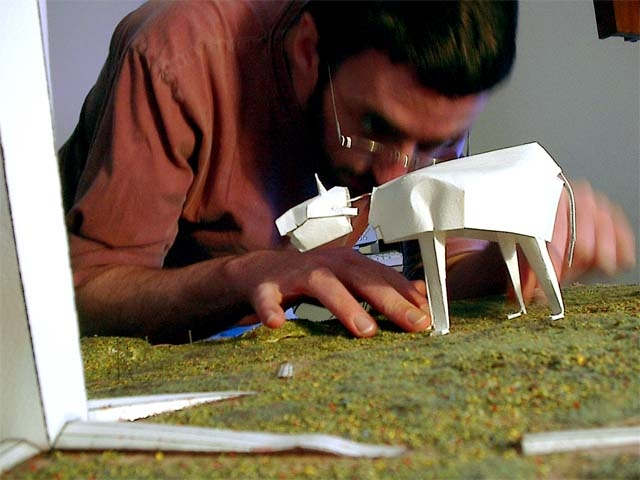
Adam Bizanski working on The Shins music video "Pink Bullets"

In television, he created and wrote the Israeli drama series Magpie with Omri Shenar. The series follows a man released from prison after two decades who returns seeking revenge while serving as a police informant. It ran for two seasons and adapted in India as Kankhajura. in 2025.

He also wrote the international thriller Unconditional, co-created with Dana Idisis. The series premiered on Apple TV in 2026. The show tells the story of a mother-daughter vacation going off the rails as 23-year-old Gali is arrested for drug smuggling at the airport in Moscow. Her mom, Orna, must fight for her freedom, in a journey that will take her around the globe into a web of crime and corruption and force her to face truths about motherhood, family and commitment.

== Filmography ==
=== Television ===
year	title	Credits
2019-2023	Magpie	Creator, Writer
2025	Kankhajura	Executive Producer: Original Format Team
2026	Unconditional	Creator, Writer, Executive Producer

=== Music videos ===
Year	Artist	Song
2003	Yoni Bloch	It's Nice Outside
2005	The Shins	Pink Bullets
2006	Wolf Parade	Modern World
2006	Zero 7 feat. José González	Left Behind
2006	Guster	Satellite
2007	Rona Kenan	Ness
2007	Dntel feat. Arthur & Yu	The Distance
2010	Guster	Architects and Engineers
2010	Foals	2 trees
2015	Shlomi Shaban	An Exercise in Awakening

=== Commercials ===
- Sony Ericsson ("Choose", 2007)
- Huggies Little Swimmers ("Left out", 2008)
- The Observer ("Book of Art", 2008)
- ING Bank (2008)
- Celio (2009)
- Orange (2011)

=== Short films ===
- Paul - (2012) - winner of the Silver Hugo award at the Chicago International Film Festival.
- Shadow Puppets - (2013)
