= Striker (2010 film) =

- Theatrical poster
- Directed by: Chandan Arora
- Screenplay by: Chandan Arora; Sunita Rajwar
- Story by: Sunita Rajwar; Iqbal Merchant
- Dialogues by: Vijay Maurya; Sagar Kapoor; Pankaj Saraswat
- Produced by: Chandan Arora
- Starring: Siddharth; Usha Jadhav; Padmapriya; Aditya Pancholi; Ankur Vikal; Anupam Kher; Seema Biswas; Anup Soni
- Cinematography: P. S. Vinod
- Edited by: Sajit Unnikrishnan
- Music by: Songs: Vishal Bharadwaj; Amit Trivedi; Yuvan Shankar Raja; Blaaze; Swanand Kirkire; Shailendra Barve; Score: Shri Shriram
- Production companies: Indian Films; Makefilms
- Distributed by: Studio 18
- Release date: 5 February 2010
- Country: India
- Language: Hindi

Striker is a 2010 Indian Hindi-language action drama film co-written, directed and produced by Chandan Arora. It stars Siddharth, Usha Jadhav, and Padmapriya in the lead roles, while Aditya Pancholi, Ankur Vikal, Anupam Kher, Seema Biswas, and Anup Soni, among others, play supporting roles. The film had a theatrical release in cinemas throughout India on 5 February 2010. It also premiered on YouTube the same day, thus becoming the first ever Indian film to premiere on YouTube internationally on the same day as its domestic theatrical release.

== Plot ==
Born into a poor family, Suryakant Sarang grows up with few luxuries. Poor health keeps him away from school often, and that is when his elder brother, Chandrakant, introduces him to Carrom. Winning the Junior Carrom Championship at 12 is not enough to keep Surya's fire for the sport burning through adolescence. Hopes for a job in Dubai replace the passion for carrom as Surya grows into a young man. Duped by a bogus overseas employment agency, Surya loses all the hard-earned money he had saved for going to Dubai. Surya is forced to cross paths with Jaleel. Since the 1970s, when the settlements in the ghetto began, Jaleel had acquired a stronghold in the area. He had his hands in every illicit activity since then. Feeding on the weaknesses of people, Jaleel was the self-proclaimed king of Malwani. Reintroduced to Carrom by his childhood friend Zaid, this time to the Carrom hustling scene, Surya starts playing again. Being cheated of his hard-earned money by the same man who had caused misery for many families, Surya decides to take on Jaleel on his turf. His patience and cool attitude are his biggest strengths, but life has its own ways of testing it.

== Cast ==
- Siddharth as Suryakant Sarang
  - Bhavya Gandhi as young Suryakant
- Usha Jadhav as Rajni
- Padmapriya as Madhu
- Aditya Pancholi as Jaleel (local crime boss)
- Ankur Vikal as Zaid
- Anupam Kher as Inspector Farooque
- Seema Biswas as Surya's mother
- Anup Soni as Chandrakant Sarang
- Vidya Malvade as Devi Sarang
- Nicolette Bird as Noorie

== Production ==
=== Development ===
Striker is editor Chandan Arora's third directorial venture after Main Madhuri Dixit Banna Chahti Hoon (2003) and Main, Meri Patni Aur Woh (2005). The film was in development since November 2007, which revolves around the lives of a boy living in slums grows up to be a carrom player, though Arora cliamed it was neither a sports film nor a biopic, but had been accounted from real events, which Arora had fictionalised it to make it more cinematic.

Though he had not been a great carrom player, Arora considered that carrom had been a traditional game that had people had grown up playing it with families and friends. He was surprised that the game, despite being common in the underbelly of India, did not gain the popularity it anticipated, adding "It's a great indoor sport that the whole family could play and on any given day, you never know, every player has an equal chance of emerging triumphs on his/her day." Arora also produced the film as well.

=== Casting ===
"I think everybody, in their childhood at least, has played carrom, so that connect is there. Also, this film is about the game on a very basic level, otherwise it is the story of an underdog, a story of the triumph of the human spirit over odds."

— Siddharth

Arora chose Siddharth to play the lead role, after being impressed by his performance in his debut film Boys (2003). When Siddharth ventured in Hindi cinema through Rang De Basanti (2006), Arora met him and narrated a different script which was a romantic drama instead. But during discussions, Arora shared few instances of the script for Striker, that led to Siddharth being impressed and both of them decided to prioritse on Striker first. The entire script was constructed with Siddharth in mind. Though Siddharth, like all of Indian people grew up playing carrom with his family and friends, he had to undergo a carrom training for two months so that he had to get the body language and mannerisms of a carrom player as well as working with a carrom coach to practice in between shots. He also lived in the slums of Malwani for two weeks to emulate the character of a youngster grew up in slums. Bhavya Gandhi played the character's younger version.

Nicolette Bird and Padmapriya were chosen as the female leads, having significant part in the plot despite their limited duration on-screen. Arora saw few clips of Padmapriya's South films on YouTube and zeroed her for the film, while Bird was chosen as they needed someone with "that kind of beauty and innocence and still depict the kind of sweet romance". Aditya Pancholi served as the first choice for the antagonist Jaleel, as Arora believed him as "a very powerful actor". Initially, the character has been shown in two different age-groups: one during his younger days, and the other during his current period. When Arora met Pancholi, he lost a lot of weight and looked really young which helped him to play the younger part with ease. Anupam Kher was cast for the role of Inspector Farooq, a character which Arora considered crucial to the screenplay despite the limited screen time. Other cast members included Usha Jadhav, Seema Biswas, Anup Soni, Ankur Vikal and Vidya Malvade.

=== Filming ===
Striker was filmed entirely in Mumbai. However, due to the 1980s setting, the team had to show the city authentically for the time period in contrast to the modern-day Mumbai. Hence, much of the film was shot in Kalyan, located in the outskirts of Mumbai. The team also constructed a huge set of a basti in Malvani and shot extensively there. Filming took place for two years from 2008 to late-2009, as Siddharth was simultaneously doing projects in Telugu and the team had to wait for his availability for filming his portions.

== Soundtrack ==
The soundtrack album of Striker consists of 8 songs composed by six various artists: Vishal Bhardwaj, noted Tamil composer Yuvan Shankar Raja in his Bollywood debut, Amit Trivedi, rapper Blaaze, Shailendra Barve and lyricist-singer Swanand Kirkire, whilst lyrics are penned by Nitin Raikwar, Blaaze, Prashant Ingole, Jeetendra Joshi, Swanand Kirkire and Gulzar. Shri was the music producer and composed the original soundtrack. The album was released on 12 January 2010.

== Release ==
Striker was theatrically released in India on 5 February 2010 along with the long-delayed Hindi film The Hangman (2005). Internationally, the film was premiered on YouTube for free, while in the United States the film will be streamed on a rental basis, as part of an agreement with the distributor. The film was not made available for the YouTube traffic from the originating India, as the producers wanted to ensure maximum revenue from the theatrical sales. The producers considered the simultaneous theatrical and digital release as a "cost-effective" method as well as also ensuring free distribution for films which are content-driven, but do not get maximum theatrical distribution due to the absence of notable stars.

Within three days of its release in YouTube, the film received 220,000 views despite the theatrical underperformance. In July 2010, the film was made available in YouTube on India for the domestic audience, after the film received 1 million views.

=== Critical response ===
Sukanya Verma of Rediff.com gave the film a rating of three out of five stars and opined that "An interesting film with a lot on its mind, Striker isn't comfort cinema but I will recommend it anyway". Nikhat Kazmi from The Times of India gave the film the same rating and wrote that "Director Chandan Arora has already proved his desire to make different cinema with his earlier two ventures. With Striker he continues to successfully strike out for new grounds. The high point of the film is its authenticity, its heartwarming tale and its performances [...] Don't believe the lacklustre promos. The film has more meat—and meaning—than it promises." Sanjukta Sharma of Mint gave the film a positive review and stated that "Striker is one of the good films of the year so far. It is not a breezy film or a candyfloss entertainer, but it's surely an example of committed and adept film-making. There's never enough of it". Minty Tejpal of Mumbai Mirror wrote "Striker is a well-made film and worth a watch".

Shubhra Gupta of The Indian Express rated three out of five stars, calling it "a striking example of just how good a film can be when the setting and the people are real. And it is an equally striking example of how a terrific effort can lose steam when it moves away from its central focus." She further concluded that, what really stays with you is the desperation of slumdogs Surya and Zayed, particularly the latter, who plays it with fatal insouciance, as they try and rise above their circumstance". Mayank Shekhar of Hindustan Times rated three out of five, saying "You put together a film where the hero doesn’t lip-sync a song, and there are no dances, the film becomes different on its own [...] the presence of a believable setting, something that’s conventional for most films, that can immediately mark itself as different for a Hindi movie as well." Critic Subhash K. Jha stated "See the film for its frenetic characters who seem to have distant links with the people we saw in Vikram Bhatt's Ghulam and Danny Boyle's Slumdog Millionaire. Happily the tragic outcome of the lives lived on the edge in Chandan Arora's film is strictly their own."

Anupama Chopra of NDTV wrote "Striker is the kind of film that fills you with regret. There is skilful direction here, some nicely etched moments and commendable performances and yet the film never gathers enough momentum to make an impact. Striker never becomes the film it could have been." Rajeev Masand of CNN-IBN stated "Despite Arora's solid efforts, the film loses steam well before the end credits roll. Although only two hours in running time, the movie feels endlessly long, and fails to culminate satisfyingly [...] It's not a bad film by any measure, but it most definitely could've been better. Watch it for some excellent acting and for its gritty realistic feel." Taran Adarsh of Bollywood Hungama rated one-and-a-half out of five, stating that the film "lacks a solid script to strike a chord".

=== Accolades ===
Award	Date of ceremony (Note: Date is linked to the article about the awards held that year, wherever possible.)	Category	Recipients	Result	Ref.
Filmfare Awards	29 January 2011	Best Editing	Sajit Unnikrishnan	Nominated	
