= Chandan Arora =

Indian film director

- Education: University of Mumbai
- Occupations: Film editor; screenwriter; film director
- Years active: 1999–present

Chandan Arora is an Indian film editor, screenwriter and director who works in Hindi films. He is most known for his work in films such as Mast (1999), Company (2002), Krrish 3 (2013), Pad Man (2018), and Mission Mangal (2019). He made his directorial debut with Main Madhuri Dixit Banna Chahti Hoon (2003), produced by Ram Gopal Varma which followed by the comedy, Main, Meri Patni Aur Woh (2005) and Striker.

== Filmography ==
=== As director ===
- Main Madhuri Dixit Banna Chahti Hoon (2003)
- Main, Meri Patni Aur Woh (2005)
- Striker (2010) - Also producer
- Kanneda (2025) (web series)
- Kankhajura (2025) (web series)

=== As screenwriter ===
- Striker (2010)
- Aval (2017)
- Azaad (2025)
- Kanneda (2025) (web series)
- Kankhajura (2025) (web series)

=== As editor ===
- Mast (1999)
- Jungle (2000)
- Raju Chacha (2000)
- Pyaar Tune Kya Kiya (2001)
- Filhaal... (2002)
- Company (2002)
- Road (2002)
- Kehtaa Hai Dil Baar Baar (2002)
- Cheeni Kum (2007)
- Karma, Confessions and Holi (2007)
- Fandry (2013)
- Krrish 3 (2013)
- Ghayal Once Again (2016)
- Tere Bin Laden: Dead or Alive (2016)
- Global Baba (2016)
- Ki & Ka (2016)
- Qarib Qarib Singlle (2017)
- Pad Man (2018)
- Kedarnath (2018)
- Mission Mangal (2019)
- P Se Pyaar F Se Faraar (2019)
- Satellite Shankar (2019)
- Jawaani Jaaneman (2020)
- Hello Charlie (2021)
- Bell Bottom (2021)
- Chandigarh Kare Aashiqui (2021)
- Cuttputlli (2022)
- Freddy (2022)
- Ved (2022)
- Gaslight (2023)
- Non Stop Dhamaal (2023)
- Ishq Vishk Rebound (2024)
- Azaad (2025)

== Awards ==
=== Filmfare Awards ===
- 2003: Best Editing: Company

IIFA Awards

- 2003: Best Editing: Company

=== Zee Cine Awards ===
- 2004: Best Debutant Director: Main Madhuri Dixit Banna Chahti Hoon
- 2014: Best Editing: Krrish 3

=== Screen Awards ===
- 2001: Best Editing: Jungle
