= Pragya Yadav =

Swedish model, actress, and producer

Pragya Kapoor
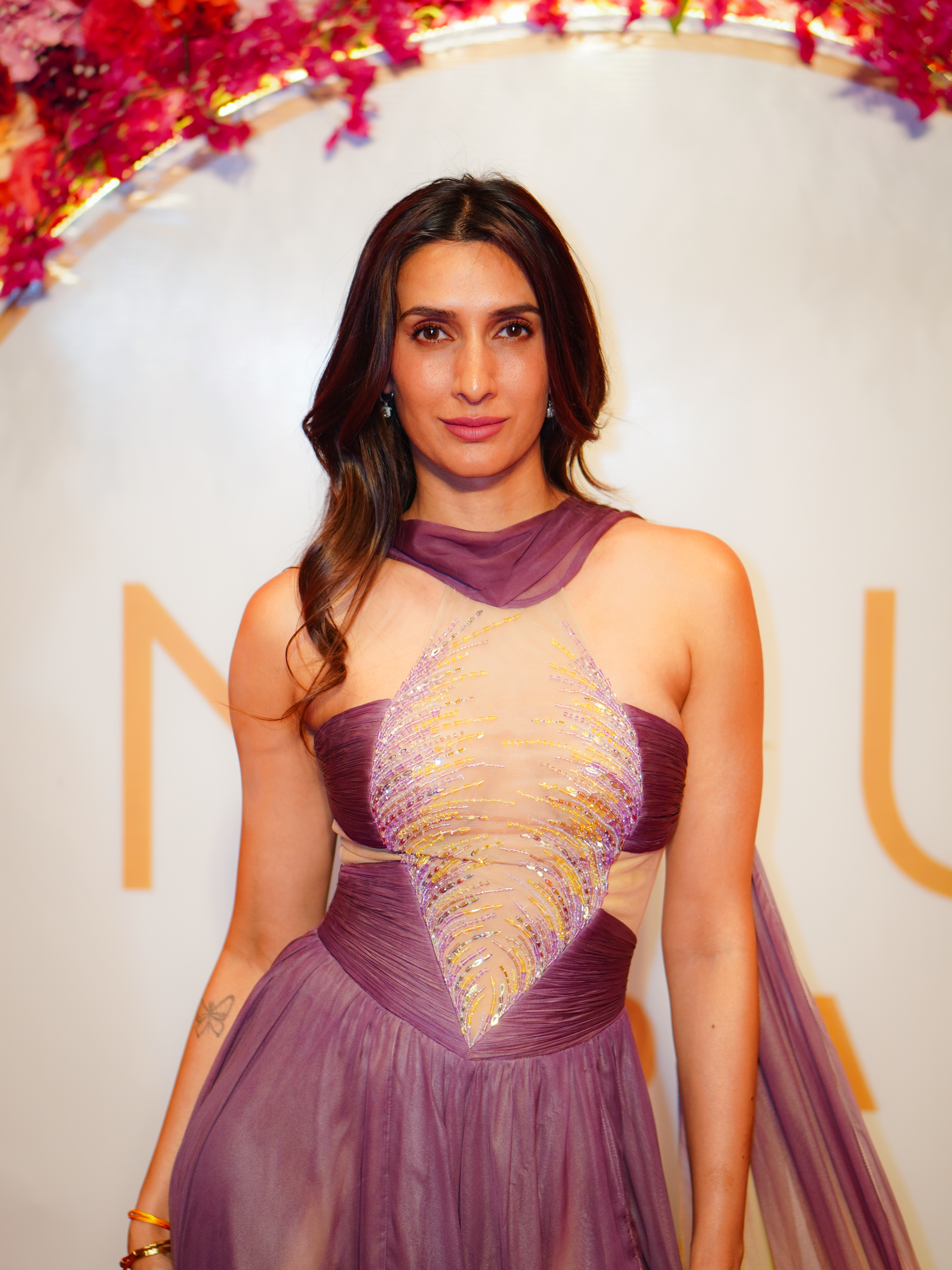
- Pragya Kapoor at Miss Universe India 2026
- Born: Pragya Yadav; Borgholm, Sweden
- Occupations: Actress, producer, model
- Spouse: Abhishek Kapoor (m. 2015)
- Children: 2

Pragya Kapoor (née Yadav) is a Swedish model, actress, and producer in Indian cinema. She was born to Indian parents in Borgholm and raised in Karlskrona, Sweden. She has trained in acting at the Institute of Advanced Acting and Behavioral Studies.

== Career ==
Pragya Kapoor is best known for her work in Amole Gupte's Hawaa Hawaai (2014). She has produced Kedarnath (2018) with Ronnie Screwvala, along with Abhishek Kapoor and Abhishek Nayyar as co-producers. She is the co-founder of Guy In The Sky Pictures. In collaboration with Bhushan Kumar's T Series, she was to be producing Sharaabi.

== Filmography ==
Year	Title	Role	Notes
2014	Hawaa Hawaai	Pragya Nanda	
